= Walter Bussey =

English footballer

Personal information
- Full name: Walter Bussey
- Date of birth: 6 December 1904
- Place of birth: Eckington, England
- Date of death: January 1982 (aged 77)
- Place of death: Exeter, England
- Height: 5 ft 10 in (1.78 m)
- Position: Inside forward

Senior career*
Years	Team	Apps	(Gls)
1924	Denaby United		
1924–1932	Stoke City	185	(46)
1933–1934	Blackpool	25	(8)
1934–1936	Swansea Town	72	(18)
1936–1938	Exeter City	75	(16)
Total		357	(88)
- * Club domestic league appearances and goals

Walter Bussey (6 December 1904 – January 1982) was an English footballer who played in the Football League for Blackpool, Exeter City, Swansea Town and Stoke City. He made 185 appearances for Stoke.

== Career ==
Bussey was born in Eckington on the Yorkshire border and began working as a collier. Whilst employed in the mines Bussey played amateur football with teams in the Doncaster area. He was spotted by scouts at Stoke City and signed for the club in March 1924 initially retaining his amateur status so he could also turn out for Denaby United. He eventually signed a professional contract in November 1925 becoming one of 34 players used by Tom Mather in 1925–26 as Stoke suffered relegation from the Second Division. Bussey broke into the side in 1926–27 campaign scoring eight goals in 15 appearances as Stoke went on to win the Third Division North title.

Despite lacking in height Bussey became a vital member of Mather's team being used mainly as a playmaker and provided many goals for Charlie Wilson whilst also having a decent scoring record himself. His most prolific season in a Stoke shirt came in the 1928–29 season with saw him score 12 goals in 38 appearances. Whilst Bussey was a clear favourite with Mather and the supporters he was notoriously inconsistent being described as having "spasms of form and scoring".

With the emergence of Harry Ware and Tommy Sale, Bussey left Stoke in October 1933 for Sandy MacFarlane's Blackpool. He scored 9 goals in 27 appearances for the Seasiders before moving on to Swansea Town. He spent two season at the Vetch Field before ending his career with Exeter City. He later worked as a painter and decorator in the Exeter area until his death in January 1982.

== Career statistics ==
Appearances and goals by club, season and competition
Club	Season	League			FA Cup		Other		Total	
Club	Season	Division	Apps	Goals	Apps	Goals	Apps	Goals	Apps	Goals
Stoke City	1925–26	Second Division	4	0	0	0	—		4	0
Stoke City	1926–27	Third Division North	15	8	0	0	—		15	8
Stoke City	1927–28	Second Division	21	8	4	1	—		25	9
Stoke City	1928–29	Second Division	37	11	1	1	—		38	12
Stoke City	1929–30	Second Division	31	6	1	0	—		32	6
Stoke City	1930–31	Second Division	39	5	3	0	—		42	5
Stoke City	1931–32	Second Division	37	8	3	2	—		40	10
Stoke City	1932–33	Second Division	1	0	0	0	—		1	0
Stoke City	Total		185	46	12	4	—		197	50
Blackpool	1933–34	Second Division	25	8	2	1	—		27	9
Swansea Town	1934–35	Second Division	37	7	2	1	—		39	8
Swansea Town	1935–36	Second Division	32	11	0	0	—		32	11
Swansea Town	1936–37	Second Division	3	0	0	0	—		3	0
Swansea Town	Total		72	18	2	1	—		74	19
Exeter City	1936–37	Third Division South	20	5	3	1	—		23	6
Exeter City	1937–38	Third Division South	36	6	2	0	1	0	39	6
Exeter City	1938–39	Third Division South	19	5	0	0	1	0	20	5
Exeter City	Total		75	16	5	1	2	0	82	17
Career total			357	88	21	7	2	0	380	95

== Honours ==
Stoke City

- Football League Third Division North champions: 1926–27
- Football League Second Division champions: 1932–33
