= Dave Beswick =

English footballer (1910–1991)

Personal information
- Full name: David Beswick
- Date of birth: 18 June 1910
- Place of birth: Stoke-on-Trent, England
- Date of death: 1991 (aged 81)
- Position: Goalkeeper

Senior career*
Years	Team	Apps	(Gls)
- Mount Pleasant
1929–1932	Stoke City	9	(0)
1933	Walsall	0	(0)
- * Club domestic league appearances and goals

David Beswick (18 June 1910 – 1991) was an English footballer who played in the Football League for Stoke City.

== Career ==
Beswick was born in Stoke-on-Trent and played for Mount Pleasant before joining Stoke City in 1929. He provided back up to Dick Williams, Norman Lewis and Roy John during a four-year spell at the Victoria Ground. He played once in 1929–30 six times in 1930–31 and twice in 1932–33 before leaving for Walsall. He made just one appearance for the "Saddlers" which came in the Third Division North Cup.

== Career statistics ==
Club	Season	League			FA Cup		3rd Div. Cup		Total	
Club	Season	Division	Apps	Goals	Apps	Goals	Apps	Goals	Apps	Goals
Stoke City	1929–30	Second Division	1	0	0	0	0	0	1	0
Stoke City	1930–31	Second Division	6	0	0	0	0	0	6	0
Stoke City	1931–32	Second Division	0	0	0	0	0	0	0	0
Stoke City	1932–33	Second Division	2	0	0	0	0	0	2	0
Stoke City	Total		9	0	0	0	0	0	9	0
Walsall	1933–34	Third Division North	0	0	0	0	1	0	1	0
Career Total			9	0	0	0	1	0	10	0
