= Bobby Liddle =

English footballer

Personal information
- Full name: Robert Liddle
- Date of birth: 11 April 1908
- Place of birth: Gateshead, England
- Date of death: 12 April 1972 (aged 64)
- Place of death: Nottingham, England
- Height: 5 ft 6 in (1.68 m)
- Position: Winger

Senior career*
| Years | Team | Apps | (Gls) |
| 1927 | Washington Colliery | | |
| 1928–1938 | Stoke City | 297 | (61) |
- * Club domestic league appearances and goals

Robert Liddle (11 April 1908 – 12 April 1972) was an English footballer who played in the Football League for Stoke City.

== Career ==
Liddle was born in Gateshead and at the age of 19 he was working as a miner at Washington Colliery also playing in the works football team along with Joe Mawson. The pair were signed by Stoke City in January 1928. Liddle was a small, tricky, right winger and became a very likeable person both on and off the pitch. He scored on his debut in a 5–1 win over Nottingham Forest on the opening day of the 1928–29 season however he did not fully establish himself in Tom Mather's side until the next campaign. He was able to play in all forward positions and was more than capable of using both feet. This two footed ability saw Liddle play out of position as he played most of 1929–30 and 1930–31 at inside left. He scored a career best of 15 in 1930–31 as he finished joined top scorer with Wilf Kirkham. The emergence of Mawson and Tommy Sale as natural goalscorers in 1931–32 gave Liddle his right wing position back and targets for which to aim his crosses which worked well as Stoke gained promotion in 1932–33.

Being primarily a right flank player, Liddle established a good rapport with right back and long serving captain Bob McGrory and the two became good friends. When a young up and coming Stanley Matthews burst onto the scene and took Liddle's number 7 position, McGrory took offence. McGrory became manager in 1935 and Liddle remained out of position but he regained his place during World War II with Matthews spending most of his time away with the RAF and making guest appearances. He retired once the Football League resumed in 1946 after making 316 appearances scoring 64 goals. He was then appointed club trainer a position he kept until 1953. He then moved to Nottingham where he became a newsagent until his death in 1972.

== Career statistics ==
Appearances and goals by club, season and competition
| Club | Season | League | | | FA Cup | | Total | |
| Club | Season | Division | Apps | Goals | Apps | Goals | Apps | Goals |
|---|---|---|---|---|---|---|---|---|
| Stoke City | 1928–29 | Second Division | 12 | 1 | 0 | 0 | 12 | 1 |
| Stoke City | 1929–30 | Second Division | 25 | 6 | 0 | 0 | 25 | 6 |
| Stoke City | 1930–31 | Second Division | 41 | 14 | 3 | 1 | 44 | 15 |
| Stoke City | 1931–32 | Second Division | 39 | 11 | 5 | 0 | 44 | 11 |
| Stoke City | 1932–33 | Second Division | 33 | 7 | 2 | 1 | 35 | 8 |
| Stoke City | 1933–34 | First Division | 33 | 6 | 3 | 0 | 36 | 6 |
| Stoke City | 1934–35 | First Division | 38 | 10 | 1 | 0 | 39 | 10 |
| Stoke City | 1935–36 | First Division | 33 | 4 | 5 | 1 | 38 | 5 |
| Stoke City | 1936–37 | First Division | 20 | 1 | 0 | 0 | 20 | 1 |
| Stoke City | 1937–38 | First Division | 21 | 1 | 0 | 0 | 21 | 1 |
| Stoke City | 1938–39 | First Division | 2 | 0 | 0 | 0 | 2 | 0 |
| Career total | | | 297 | 61 | 19 | 3 | 316 | 64 |

== Honours ==
- Football League Second Division champions: 1932–33
