= 1935–36 Stoke City F.C. season =

Stoke City
1935–36 season
- Chairman: Mr A.McSherwin
- Manager: Bob McGrory
- Stadium: Victoria Ground
- Football League First Division: 4th (47 Points)
- FA Cup: Fifth Round
- Top goalscorer: League: Tommy Sale (14); All: Tommy Sale (15)
- Highest home attendance: 45,470 vs Arsenal (28 September 1935)
- Lowest home attendance: 8,374 vs Middlesbrough (21 December 1935)
- Average home league attendance: 21,586
Home colours

The 1935–36 season was Stoke City's 36th season in the Football League and the 22nd in the First Division.

In June 1935 long-serving defender Bob McGrory replaced Tom Mather as first-team manager and in his first season in charge Stoke went on to record their finest season up to this point finishing in 4th position in the First Division. They were never out of the top four for the last three months of the season and whilst they never really threatened runaway leaders Sunderland, Stoke were considered to be one of the best teams in the country. The 1935–36 season finish of 4th is only matched by the performance by the Stoke team of the 1946–47 season.

== Season review ==
=== League ===
After last season Stoke went on a tour of Denmark winning all three matches against local opposition. On their return to England in June 1935, Bob McGrory replaced Tom Mather as manager. Mather had been at the helm for over eleven years and did well in taking Stoke from Third Division football to the First. It also spelt the end of McGrory's playing career in which he made 510 appearances for the club, a total not to be surpassed for 24 years.

The first signing McGrory made was that of Huddersfield Town goalkeeper Norman Wilkinson he would prove to be a sound addition. Despite this McGrory gave the squad a vote of confidence and indeed few clubs in the country showed little alteration to their squads than Stoke City. Whilst it was 'as you were' on the playing side, Stoke appointed a host of new backroom staff and Arthur Turner was made club captain. The supporters were disappointed that despite there being money available no new players arrived and their concerns were increased when the reserves beat the first team in a public friendly match.

The supporters need not have worried as McGrory's first season turned out to be one of the finest in the club's history as they achieved fourth place in the First Division. They were never out of the top four for the last three months of the season and were generally accepted as one of the countries most impressive sides. With more players being promoted from the youth ranks Stoke looked set for a bright future.

=== FA Cup ===
Stoke required replays to beat lower league Millwall and Manchester United but Barnsley knocked Stoke out 2–1 in the fifth round.

== Final league table ==
Pos	Team	Pld	W	D	L	GF	GA	GAv	Pts
2	Derby County	42	18	12	12	61	52	1.173	48
3	Huddersfield Town	42	18	12	12	59	56	1.054	48
4	Stoke City	42	20	7	15	57	57	1.000	47
5	Brentford	42	17	12	13	81	60	1.350	46
6	Arsenal	42	15	15	12	78	48	1.625	45

Source: World Football
Rules for classification: 1) Points; 2) Goal average; 3) Goals scored

== Results ==
Stoke's score comes first

=== Legend ===
Win	Draw	Loss

=== Football League First Division ===
Match	Date	Opponent	Venue	Result	Attendance	Scorers
1	31 August 1935	Leeds United	H	3–1	22,549	Johnson (2), Davies
2	4 September 1935	Chelsea	A	5–3	27,000	Johnson, Davies, Sale (2), Matthews
3	7 September 1935	West Bromwich Albion	A	0–2	25,000	
4	9 September 1935	Chelsea	H	3–0	21,306	Sale, Steele, Turner (pen)
5	14 September 1935	Sunderland	H	0–2	34,509	
6	18 September 1935	Liverpool	A	0–2	35,000	
7	21 September 1935	Birmingham	A	5–0	12,000	Matthews (3), Johnson (2)
8	28 September 1935	Arsenal	H	0–3	45,470	
9	5 October 1935	Manchester City	A	2–1	40,000	Sale, Westland
10	12 October 1935	Preston North End	H	2–1	21,876	Sale, Turner (pen)
11	19 October 1935	Brentford	A	0–0	30,000	
12	26 October 1935	Derby County	H	0–0	27,384	
13	2 November 1935	Everton	A	1–5	34,000	Johnson
14	9 November 1935	Bolton Wanderers	H	1–2	21,668	Sale
15	16 November 1935	Huddersfield Town	A	1–2	12,000	Johnson
16	23 November 1935	Portsmouth	H	2–0	16,470	Sale (2)
17	30 November 1935	Aston Villa	A	0–4	25,000	
18	7 December 1935	Wolverhampton Wanderers	H	4–1	16,000	Sale (2), Liddle (2)
19	14 December 1935	Sheffield Wednesday	A	1–0	14,000	Sale
20	21 December 1935	Middlesbrough	H	1–1	8,374	Matthews
21	25 December 1935	Blackburn Rovers	A	1–0	21,976	Matthews
22	26 December 1935	Blackburn Rovers	H	2–0	23,000	Sale (2)
23	28 December 1935	Leeds United	A	1–4	12,000	Steele
24	4 January 1936	West Bromwich Albion	H	3–2	20,188	Steele, Matthews, Liddle
25	18 January 1936	Sunderland	A	0–1	14,000	
26	1 February 1936	Arsenal	A	0–1	47,000	
27	6 February 1936	Birmingham	H	3–1	11,485	Davies (2), Westland
28	8 February 1936	Manchester City	H	1–0	27,386	Westland
29	19 February 1936	Preston North End	A	1–1	10,000	Turner (pen)
30	22 February 1936	Brentford	H	2–2	15,000	Sale, Liddle
31	29 February 1936	Bolton Wanderers	A	2–1	10,204	Steele, Matthews
32	7 March 1936	Aston Villa	H	2–3	18,344	Steele (2)
33	14 March 1936	Derby County	A	1–0	20,000	Steele
34	21 March 1936	Huddersfield Town	H	1–0	22,000	Matthews
35	28 March 1936	Portsmouth	A	0–2	17,000	
36	4 April 1936	Everton	H	2–1	18,717	Turner, Matthews
37	10 April 1936	Grimsby Town	A	0–3	9,000	
38	11 April 1936	Wolverhampton Wanderers	A	1–1	20,000	Steele
39	13 April 1936	Grimsby Town	H	1–0	22,770	Hodgson (o.g.)
40	18 April 1936	Sheffield Wednesday	H	0–3	16,362	
41	25 April 1936	Middlesbrough	A	0–0	10,000	
42	2 May 1936	Liverpool	H	2–1	13,231	Westland, Bradshaw (o.g.)

=== FA Cup ===
Round	Date	Opponent	Venue	Result	Attendance	Scorers
R3	11 January 1936	Millwall	A	0–0	25,000	
R3 Replay	15 January 1936	Millwall	H	4–0	18,000	Steele (3), Liddle
R4	25 January 1936	Manchester United	H	0–0	25,000	
R4 Replay	28 January 1936	Manchester United	A	2–0	35,000	Sale, Robson
R5	15 February 1936	Barnsley	A	1–2	40,245	Davies

== Squad statistics ==
Pos.	Name	League		FA Cup		Total	
Pos.	Name	Apps	Goals	Apps	Goals	Apps	Goals
GK	(England) Norman Lewis	17	0	0	0	17	0
GK	(England) Norman Wilkinson	25	0	5	0	30	0
DF	(England) Billy Spencer	15	0	0	0	15	0
DF	(England) Charlie Scrimshaw	42	0	5	0	47	0
DF	(England) Bill Winstanley	26	0	5	0	31	0
MF	(England) Harry Sellars	6	0	0	0	6	0
MF	(England) Horace Smith	0	0	0	0	0	0
MF	(England) Frank Soo	35	0	5	0	40	0
MF	(England) Arthur Turner	42	4	5	0	47	4
MF	(England) Arthur Tutin	42	0	5	0	47	0
FW	(England) John Almond	2	0	0	0	2	0
FW	(England) George Antonio	1	0	0	0	1	0
FW	(England) Harry Davies	29	4	5	1	34	5
FW	(Wales) Syd Fursland	1	0	0	0	1	0
FW	(England) Joe Johnson	31	7	0	0	31	7
FW	(England) Bobby Liddle	33	4	5	1	38	5
FW	(England) Stanley Matthews	40	10	5	0	45	10
FW	(England) Billy Robson	0	0	1	1	1	1
FW	(England) Tommy Sale	32	14	5	1	37	15
FW	(England) Freddie Steele	29	8	4	3	33	11
FW	(Scotland) James Westland	14	4	0	0	14	4
–	Own goals	–	2	–	0	–	2
