= Henry Salmon =

English footballer (1910–1944)

Personal information
- Full name: Henry Salmon
- Date of birth: 14 March 1910
- Place of birth: Fenton, Staffordshire, England
- Date of death: 30 July 1944 (aged 34)
- Place of death: Caen, France
- Position: Defender

Senior career*
Years	Team	Apps	(Gls)
- Stoke St Peter's
- Longton Hall
1928	Macclesfield	1	(0)
1932–1933	Stoke City	3	(1)
1933–1934	Millwall	27	(1)
1934–1935	Wellington Town		
1936–1937	Southport	24	(0)
- Shrewsbury Town
Total		55	(2)
- * Club domestic league appearances and goals

Henry Salmon (14 March 1910 – 30 July 1944) was an English footballer who played in the Football League for Millwall, Southport, and Stoke City.

== Career ==
Salmon was born in Fenton and played with local clubs Stoke St Peter's, Longton Hall and Macclesfield Town before joining Stoke City in 1932. He played three matches for Stoke scoring once in a 4–0 win against Oldham Athletic in the 1932–33 season as Stoke won the Second Division title. He left at the end of the season for London club Millwall and suffered relegation. He returned north to play for Wellington Town, Southport and Shrewsbury Town.

== Later life ==
Salmon served in World War II, being killed in action in the battle for Caen during the Normandy campaign on 30 July 1944, aged 34, and was buried at Fontenay-le-Pesnel War Cemetery (section II.C18), Tessel, Calvados, France. Then a sergeant in the 1/7th battalion of the Royal Warwickshire Regiment, he left a wife, Doris. He is commemorated as 'Harry Salmon' by the Commonwealth War Graves Commission.

== Career statistics ==
Appearances and goals by club, season and competition
Club	Season	League			FA Cup		3rd Div. Cup		Total	
Club	Season	Division	Apps	Goals	Apps	Goals	Apps	Goals	Apps	Goals
Macclesfield	1927–28	Cheshire League	1	0	0	0	0	0	1	0
Stoke City	1932–33	Second Division	3	1	0	0	0	0	3	1
Stoke City	1933–34	First Division	0	0	0	0	0	0	0	0
Millwall	1934–35	Third Division South	14	1	0	0	1	0	15	1
Millwall	1935–36	Third Division South	13	0	0	0	0	0	13	0
Southport	1937–38	Third Division North	24	0	1	0	1	0	26	0
Career total			55	2	1	0	2	0	58	2

== Honours ==
Stoke City

- Football League Second Division champions: 1932–33
