= Harold Taylor (footballer, born 1912) =

English footballer

Harry Taylor
Personal information
- Full name: Harold Taylor
- Date of birth: 1912
- Place of birth: Stoke-on-Trent, England
- Position: Forward

Senior career*
Years	Team	Apps	(Gls)
- Stoke St Peter's
1929–1931	Stoke City	24	(11)
1932–1936	Liverpool	70	(6)
Total		94	(17)
- * Club domestic league appearances and goals

Harold Taylor (born 1912) was an English footballer who played in the Football League for Liverpool and Stoke City.

== Career ==
Taylor joined Stoke City from local feeder club Stoke St Peter's in 1929. And after a slow start to his Stoke career he had a decent 1931–32 season where he scored nine goals in 17 league matches. At the end of the season he left for Liverpool where he became a useful back-up player making 72 appearances in five years at Anfield.

== Career statistics ==
Club	Season	League			FA Cup		Total	
Club	Season	Division	Apps	Goals	Apps	Goals	Apps	Goals
Stoke City	1929–30	Second Division	4	0	0	0	4	0
Stoke City	1930–31	Second Division	3	2	0	0	3	2
Stoke City	1931–32	Second Division	17	9	2	0	19	9
Stoke City	Total		24	11	2	0	26	11
Liverpool	1932–33	First Division	22	0	0	0	22	0
Liverpool	1933–34	First Division	19	2	2	0	21	2
Liverpool	1934–35	First Division	14	3	0	0	14	3
Liverpool	1935–36	First Division	14	1	0	0	14	1
Liverpool	1936–37	First Division	1	0	0	0	1	0
Liverpool	Total		70	6	2	0	72	6
Career Total			94	17	4	0	98	17
