= Norman Lewis (footballer) =

English footballer

Personal information
- Full name: Arthur Norman Lewis
- Date of birth: 13 June 1908
- Place of birth: Wolverhampton, England
- Date of death: 1972 (aged 63–64)
- Place of death: Wolverhampton, England
- Height: 5 ft 10 in (1.78 m)
- Position: Goalkeeper

Senior career*
Years	Team	Apps	(Gls)
1927	Sunbeam Motors		
1928–1929	Wolverhampton Wanderers	29	(0)
1929–1935	Stoke City	159	(0)
1936	Bradford Park Avenue	2	(0)
1936–1938	Tranmere Rovers	58	(0)
Total		240	(0)
- * Club domestic league appearances and goals

Arthur Norman Lewis (13 June 1908 – 1972) was an English footballer who played in the Football League for Bradford Park Avenue, Tranmere Rovers, Wolverhampton Wanderers and Stoke City.

== Career ==
Lewis was born in Wolverhampton and played for his works team Sunbeam Motors before being signed by Wolverhampton Wanderers in 1928 at the age of 20. He played 30 times for Wolves in 1928–29 before signing for Stoke City. Lewis spent six years at the "Potters" making 169 appearances for the club. He was signed by Stoke in 1929 as cover for Dick Williams. He took over from Williams in 1930–31 playing in 39 matches. Lewis then played 46 times in 1931–32 but then suffered injury and missed the whole 1932–33 season as Stoke gained promotion. He played regularly for the next three seasons but lost his place to Norman Wilkinson in 1936. He latter assisted Bradford Park Avenue and Tranmere Rovers where he won a Third Division North title in 1938.

== Career statistics ==
Appearances and goals by club, season and competition
Club	Season	League			FA Cup		Other		Total	
Club	Season	Division	Apps	Goals	Apps	Goals	Apps	Goals	Apps	Goals
Wolverhampton Wanderers	1928–29	Second Division	29	0	1	0	—		30	0
Stoke City	1929–30	Second Division	17	0	1	0	—		18	0
Stoke City	1930–31	Second Division	36	0	3	0	—		39	0
Stoke City	1931–32	Second Division	41	0	5	0	—		46	0
Stoke City	1932–33	Second Division	0	0	0	0	—		0	0
Stoke City	1933–34	First Division	12	0	1	0	—		13	0
Stoke City	1934–35	First Division	36	0	1	0	—		37	0
Stoke City	1935–36	First Division	17	0	0	0	—		17	0
Stoke City	Total		159	0	11	0	—		170	0
Bradford Park Avenue	1935–36	Second Division	2	0	0	0	—		2	0
Tranmere Rovers	1936–37	Third Division North	26	0	1	0	0	0	27	0
Tranmere Rovers	1937–38	Third Division North	11	0	0	0	2 (Note: Appearances in Football League Third Division North Cup)	0	13	0
Tranmere Rovers	1938–39	Second Division	21	0	0	0	—		21	0
Tranmere Rovers	Total		58	0	1	0	2	0	61	0
Career total			248	0	13	0	2	0	263	0
