= 1930–31 Stoke City F.C. season =

Stoke City
1930–31 season
- Chairman: Mr A.McSherwin
- Manager: Tom Mather
- Stadium: Victoria Ground
- Football League Second Division: 11th (44 Points)
- FA Cup: Third Round
- Top goalscorer: League: Wilf Kirkham & Bobby Liddle (14); All: Bobby Liddle (15)
- Highest home attendance: 26,649 vs Port Vale (13 December 1930)
- Lowest home attendance: 2,405 vs Charlton Athletic (28 February 1931)
- Average home league attendance: 11,434
Home colours

The 1930–31 season was Stoke City's 31st season in the Football League and the 11th in the Second Division.

Stoke experienced an average season as they finished in the same position as last season, 11th. The season was notable for the debuts of future star players Arthur Turner and Tommy Sale.

== Season review ==
=== League ===
Stoke's overall form in the 1930–31 season improved only marginally as they again took 11th position in the Second Division. Wins of 5–0 v Swansea Town and 4–0 over Oldham Athletic were the best results at home whilst a 7–3 hammering away at relegated Reading a day to forget for Stoke supporters. Stoke also conceded five at Everton, Preston North End and Wolverhampton Wanderers.

The campaign ended with record gate receipts being taken from the final home league fixture against FA Cup winners West Bromwich Albion. A crowd of 26,064 amounting to £1,540 saw Albion win 1–0 to clinch promotion. Three debutants in 1930–31 who were later to have a big impact on the club's fortunes, were Tommy Sale, Arthur Turner and Harry Ware whilst Tom Williamson left for Norwich City in January.

=== FA Cup ===
Stoke were knocked out of the FA Cup at the first attempt after an epic cup tie against Manchester United. After a 3–3 draw at the Victoria Ground and a goalless one at Old Trafford Stoke lost 4–2 in the 2nd replay at Anfield.

== Final league table ==
Pos	Team	Pld	W	D	L	GF	GA	GAv	Pts
9	Southampton	42	19	6	17	74	62	1.194	44
10	Bradford City	42	17	10	15	61	63	0.968	44
11	Stoke City	42	17	10	15	64	71	0.901	44
12	Oldham Athletic	42	16	10	16	61	72	0.847	42
13	Bury	42	19	3	20	75	82	0.915	41

Rules for classification: 1) Points; 2) Goal average; 3) Goals scored

== Results ==
Stoke's score comes first

=== Legend ===
Win	Draw	Loss

=== Football League Second Division ===
Match	Date	Opponent	Venue	Result	Attendance	Scorers
1	30 August 1930	Millwall	A	3–1	20,337	Kirkham (2), Sellars
2	1 September 1930	Bradford Park Avenue	H	1–1	13,000	Cull
3	6 September 1930	Oldham Athletic	H	4–0	15,055	Kirkham (3), Liddle
4	8 September 1930	Wolverhampton Wanderers	A	1–5	16,000	Kirkham
5	13 September 1930	Nottingham Forest	A	0–3	9,986	
6	15 September 1930	Wolverhampton Wanderers	H	1–2	14,000	Liddle
7	20 September 1930	Tottenham Hotspur	H	2–1	10,254	Taylor, Armitage
8	27 September 1930	Preston North End	A	1–5	12,036	Taylor
9	4 October 1930	Burnley	H	1–1	13,124	Archibald
10	11 October 1930	Southampton	A	1–2	10,000	Mawson
11	18 October 1930	Barnsley	H	0–0	9,353	
12	25 October 1930	Charlton Athletic	A	2–1	10,047	Mawson, Wilson
13	1 November 1930	Swansea Town	H	5–0	7,224	Bussey (2), Wilson (2), Mawson (pen)
14	8 November 1930	Plymouth Argyle	A	2–1	15,000	Bussey, Mawson
15	15 November 1930	Cardiff City	H	1–0	8,900	Liddle
16	22 November 1930	Everton	A	0–5	20,120	
17	29 November 1930	Bury	H	3–1	7,505	Wilson (2), Chester (o.g.)
18	6 December 1930	Bristol City	A	1–1	10,000	Liddle
19	13 December 1930	Port Vale	H	1–0	26,649	Robertson
20	20 December 1930	West Bromwich Albion	A	0–4	15,629	
21	25 December 1930	Bradford City	A	2–2	8,000	Wilson, Liddle
22	26 December 1930	Bradford City	H	1–1	15,727	Wilson
23	27 December 1930	Millwall	H	2–3	10,196	Wilson, Armitage (pen)
24	3 January 1931	Oldham Athletic	A	1–3	11,305	Kirkham
25	17 January 1931	Nottingham Forest	H	1–0	6,194	Williamson
26	26 January 1931	Tottenham Hotspur	A	0–3	10,346	
27	2 February 1931	Preston North End	H	3–1	6,340	Burns (2), Liddle
28	7 February 1931	Burnley	A	2–1	7,072	Liddle (2)
29	14 February 1931	Southampton	H	1–3	10,095	Bussey
30	21 February 1931	Barnsley	A	2–4	4,903	Wilson (2)
31	28 February 1931	Charlton Athletic	H	0–0	2,405	
32	7 March 1931	Swansea Town	A	2–1	8,000	Liddle, Archibald
33	14 March 1931	Plymouth Argyle	H	0–0	8,490	
34	21 March 1931	Cardiff City	A	2–3	4,500	Liddle, Kirkham
35	28 March 1931	Everton	H	2–0	12,300	Liddle, Bussey
36	3 April 1931	Reading	A	3–7	4,600	Armitage (pen), Kirkham (2)
37	4 April 1931	Bury	A	3–0	3,000	Liddle, Kirkham (2)
38	6 April 1931	Reading	H	2–1	10,939	Sale, Archibald
39	11 April 1931	Bristol City	H	3–1	7,626	Kirkham (2), Liddle
40	18 April 1931	Port Vale	A	0–0	13,190	
41	30 April 1931	West Bromwich Albion	H	0–1	26,064	
42	2 May 1931	Bradford Park Avenue	A	2–2	6,767	Sale, Liddle

=== FA Cup ===
Round	Date	Opponent	Venue	Result	Attendance	Scorers
R3	10 January 1931	Manchester United	H	3–3	23,415	Wilson (pen), Sale (2)
R3 Replay	14 January 1931	Manchester United	A	0–0 (aet)	22,013	
R3 2nd Replay	19 January 1931	Manchester United	N	2–4	11,788	Archibald, Liddle

== Squad statistics ==
Pos.	Name	League		FA Cup		Total	
Pos.	Name	Apps	Goals	Apps	Goals	Apps	Goals
GK	(England) Dave Beswick	6	0	0	0	6	0
GK	(England) Norman Lewis	36	0	3	0	39	0
DF	(England) Arthur Beachill	5	0	0	0	5	0
DF	(Scotland) Bob McGrory	39	0	3	0	42	0
DF	(England) Charlie Scrimshaw	2	0	0	0	2	0
DF	(England) Billy Spencer	39	0	3	0	42	0
DF	(England) Jack Tennant	1	0	0	0	1	0
MF	(England) Len Armitage	27	3	0	0	27	3
MF	(England) Peter Jackson	21	0	1	0	22	0
MF	John McDaid	1	0	0	0	1	0
MF	(Scotland) William Robertson	20	1	3	0	23	1
MF	(England) Harry Sellars	33	1	3	0	36	1
MF	Paddy Turley	3	0	0	0	3	0
MF	(England) Arthur Turner	7	0	0	0	7	0
MF	(Scotland) Tom Williamson	14	1	2	0	16	1
FW	(England) John Alderson	0	0	0	0	0	0
FW	(Scotland) Bobby Archibald	40	3	3	1	43	4
FW	(England) Billy Burns	3	2	0	0	3	2
FW	(England) Walter Bussey	39	5	3	0	42	5
FW	(England) William Cook	0	0	0	0	0	0
FW	(England) John Cull	13	1	0	0	13	1
FW	(England) Bert Hales	1	0	0	0	1	0
FW	(England) Wilf Kirkham	23	14	0	0	23	14
FW	(England) Bobby Liddle	41	14	3	1	44	15
FW	(England) Joe Mawson	11	4	0	0	11	4
FW	(England) Tommy Sale	17	2	3	2	20	4
FW	(England) Harold Taylor	3	2	0	0	3	2
FW	(England) Harry Ware	1	0	0	0	1	0
FW	(England) Charlie Wilson	16	10	3	1	19	11
–	Own goals	–	1	–	0	–	1
