= Beachill =

Beachill is an English surname. Notable people with the surname include:

- Arthur Beachill (1905–1943), English footballer
- Lee Beachill (born 1977), English squash player
