= Hugh McMahon (footballer) =

Scottish footballer

Personal information
- Full name: Hugh McMahon
- Date of birth: 7 July 1906
- Place of birth: Saltcoats, Scotland
- Date of death: 20 December 1997 (aged 91)
- Height: 5 ft 9 in (1.75 m)
- Position: Defender

Senior career*
Years	Team	Apps	(Gls)
1926–1927	Saltcoats Victoria		
1927–1930	Cowdenbeath		
1930–1931	Blackpool	26	(1)
1931–1932	Stoke City	8	(1)
1932–1935	Wrexham	144	(7)
1935–1936	Workington		
1936–1937	Doncaster Rovers	5	(0)
1937	Albion Rovers		
Total		183	(9)
- * Club domestic league appearances and goals

Hugh McMahon (7 July 1906 – 20 December 1997) was a Scottish footballer who played in the Football League for Blackpool, Doncaster Rovers, Stoke City and Wrexham.

== Career ==
Saltcoats-born McMahon made his debut for Harry Evans's Blackpool in the opening League game of the 1930–31 campaign, a 4–1 defeat at Arsenal on 30 August. He went on to appear in a further 25 games, scoring once – in a 2–1 Christmas Day victory over Sheffield United at Bloomfield Road. Twelve days earlier, he was at centre-half when Blackpool lost 10–1 to Huddersfield Town, but he escaped much of the criticism. "Hugh McMahon played stubbornly and one had the impression in the first half, even if a lot of the old faults appeared again, that his presence in the middle of the half-back line had given some measure of stability to the defence," commented one report on the game. Another stated that the defeat could have been heavier had it not been for the performance of Blackpool's goalkeeper, Horace Pearson.

McMahon joined Stoke City in 1931 and scored on his debut in a 2–1 win at home to Chesterfield at the start of the 1931–32 season. He played the first six matches of the season for Stoke before Arthur Turner returned from injury and McMahon dropped out of the side. He made two more appearances before being allowed to join Wrexham in 1932. He spent three years with the Welsh club making almost 150 league appearances. He went on to play for Workington, Doncaster Rovers and Albion Rovers.

== Career statistics ==
Appearances and goals by club, season and competition
Club	Season	League			FA Cup		Other^{[A]}		Total	
Club	Season	Division	Apps	Goals	Apps	Goals	Apps	Goals	Apps	Goals
Blackpool	1930–31	First Division	26	1	1	0	–		27	1
Stoke City	1931–32	Second Division	8	1	0	0	–		8	1
Wrexham	1932–33	Third Division North	32	2	3	0	0	0	35	2
Wrexham	1933–34	Third Division North	40	2	1	0	3	0	44	2
Wrexham	1934–35	Third Division North	38	2	1	0	1	0	40	2
Wrexham	1935–36	Third Division North	34	1	1	0	2	0	37	1
Wrexham	Total		144	7	6	0	6	0	156	7
Doncaster Rovers	1936–37	Second Division	5	0	0	0	0	0	5	0
Career total			183	9	7	0	6	0	196	9

A. The "Other" column constitutes appearances and goals in the Football League Third Division North Cup.
