= Joe Johnson (footballer, born 1911) =

English footballer (1911–1983)

Personal information
- Full name: Joseph Alfred Johnson
- Date of birth: 4 April 1911
- Place of birth: Grimsby, England
- Date of death: 8 August 1983 (aged 72)
- Place of death: West Bromwich, England
- Height: 5 ft 6 1/2 in (1.69 m)
- Position: Outside left

Senior career*
Years	Team	Apps	(Gls)
1929	Scunthorpe & Lindsey United		
1929–1931	Bristol City	7	(0)
1931–1937	Stoke City	184	(54)
1937–1939	West Bromwich Albion	52	(22)
1946	Northwich Victoria		
1946	Hereford United		
Total		243	(76)

International career
1936–1937	England	5	(2)
- * Club domestic league appearances and goals

Joseph Alfred Johnson (4 April 1911 – 8 August 1983) was an English footballer who played in the Football League for Bristol City, Stoke City and West Bromwich Albion as well as the England national team.

== Club career ==
Johnson was born in Grimsby and began working as a fishmonger whilst playing amateur football with Cleethorpes Royal Saints and then Scunthorpe & Lindsey United before being spotted by Second Division Bristol City in July 1929. He broke into the side in making his debut in the 1931–32 season. Bristol City were having a terrible campaign winning just three of their first 32 games before the club fell into severe financial difficulties and put their entire squad up for sale. Stoke City visited Ashton Gate on 16 April 1932 and the Bristol directors desperate for funds told the Stoke board they could buy whoever they wanted. Manager Tom Mather singled out their young left winger Johnson and signed him for a mere £250.

Johnson quickly took the place of the ageing Bobby Archibald and soon made an impression with the pace running up and down the left wing. With Stanley Matthews on the right wing Stoke had one of the best pairing of wingers in the country and he scored 15 times in 43 games in 1932–33 as Stoke won the Second Division title. He remained a key player in Stoke's forward line for the next four seasons and earned international recognition. He suffered an ankle injury on the opening day of the 1937–38 season and Stoke manager Bob McGrory decided to sell him to West Bromwich Albion for a fee of £6,500.

Johnson spent nine years with the Baggies and during World War II he guested for Crewe Alexandra, Leicester City and Notts County. After the war he played for Northwich Victoria and Hereford United and later ran a refreshment area in Dartmouth Park, close to the Hawthorns. He died in West Bromwich in August 1983 at the age of 72.

== International career ==
Johnson made his England debut against Ireland at Stoke's Victoria Ground. He went on to earn caps against Scotland, Norway, Sweden and Finland. He scored his two goals in the games against Sweden and Finland.

== Career statistics ==
=== Club ===
Appearances and goals by club, season and competition
Club	Season	League			FA Cup		Total	
Club	Season	Division	Apps	Goals	Apps	Goals	Apps	Goals
Bristol City	1931–32	Second Division	7	0	0	0	7	0
Stoke City	1931–32	Second Division	1	0	0	0	1	0
Stoke City	1932–33	Second Division	41	15	2	0	43	15
Stoke City	1933–34	First Division	36	8	4	1	40	9
Stoke City	1934–35	First Division	38	11	1	0	39	11
Stoke City	1935–36	First Division	31	7	0	0	31	7
Stoke City	1936–37	First Division	36	13	2	2	38	15
Stoke City	1937–38	First Division	1	0	0	0	1	0
Stoke City	Total		184	54	9	3	193	57
West Bromwich Albion	1937–38	First Division	18	7	2	0	20	7
West Bromwich Albion	1938–39	Second Division	34	15	3	0	37	15
West Bromwich Albion	Total		52	22	5	0	57	22
Career total			243	76	14	3	257	79

=== International ===
National team	Year	Apps	Goals
England	1936	1	0
England	1937	4	2
Total		5	2
