= Joe Mawson =

English footballer (1905–1959)

Personal information
- Full name: Joseph Spence Mawson
- Date of birth: 26 October 1905
- Place of birth: Brandon, Durham, England
- Date of death: 10 September 1959 (aged 53)
- Place of death: Stoke-on-Trent, England
- Position: Forward

Senior career*
Years	Team	Apps	(Gls)
1924–1925	Washington Colliery		
1925–1926	Crook Town		
1926–1927	Durham City	0	(0)
1928–1933	Stoke City	86	(46)
1934–1935	Nottingham Forest	2	(0)
1935–1936	Stockport County	3	(0)
1936	Linfield		
1936–1937	Crewe Alexandra	11	(2)
Total		102	(48)
- * Club domestic league appearances and goals

Joseph Spence Mawson (26 October 1905 – 10 September 1959) was an English footballer who played in the Football League for Crewe Alexandra, Nottingham Forest, Stockport County and Stoke City.

== Career ==
Mawson was born in Brandon, Durham and by the age of 24 he had already spent several years working at the coalface at Washington Colliery when he became one of a number of players discovered by Stoke City's north east scouts. Mawson had previously played for Crook Town, his works team Washington Colliery and Durham City. Raw and eager Mawson was given his debut in February 1929 at Swansea Town, in which he scored but his lack of guile and wayward passing soon relegated him to the reserves but his never say die attitude kept him in manager Tom Mather's plans.

Eventually Wilf Kirkham's horrific leg break on the opening day of the 1931–32 handed Mawson his chance in his natural position of centre forward. Stoke started the season poorly but the introduction of Mawson saw Stoke's fortunes turn around and he top scored with 24 goals. Stoke clearly had a squad now capable of challenging for promotion and the following season again top scored with 16 as Stoke won the Second Division title. However towards the end of the season Mawson, renowned for being a 'greedy' player squandered a number of easy chances against Plymouth Argyle as Stoke lost 1–0. A furious Mather dropped Mawson and brought in Reading's Jack Palethorpe who scored eight goals in ten games which put paid to Mawson's career at the Victoria Ground. He went on to play for Nottingham Forest, Stockport County, Linfield and Crewe Alexandra before World War II broke out.

== Style of play ==
His style was to run with the ball and he scored the majority of his goals in a head down thrust through the middle, only looking up to beat the goalkeeper.

== Career statistics ==
Appearances and goals by club, season and competition
Club	Season	League			FA Cup		Other^{[A]}		Total	
Club	Season	Division	Apps	Goals	Apps	Goals	Apps	Goals	Apps	Goals
Stoke City	1928–29	Second Division	2	1	0	0	–		2	1
Stoke City	1929–30	Second Division	11	5	0	0	–		11	5
Stoke City	1930–31	Second Division	11	4	0	0	–		11	4
Stoke City	1931–32	Second Division	34	20	5	4	–		39	24
Stoke City	1932–33	Second Division	26	16	2	0	–		28	16
Stoke City	1933–34	First Division	2	0	0	0	–		2	0
Stoke City	Total		86	46	7	4	0	0	93	50
Nottingham Forest	1934–35	Second Division	2	0	2	1	–		4	1
Stockport County	1935–36	Third Division North	3	0	0	0	1	0	4	0
Crewe Alexandra	1936–37	Third Division North	11	2	0	0	1	0	12	2
Career total			102	48	9	5	2	0	111	53

A. The "Other" column constitutes appearances and goals in the Football League Third Division North Cup.

== Honours ==
Stoke City

- Football League Second Division champions: 1932–33
