= Billy Spencer =

English footballer

Personal information
- Full name: William Spencer
- Date of birth: 15 May 1902
- Place of birth: Nelson, England
- Date of death: 1969 (aged 66–67)
- Height: 5 ft 7 1/2 in (1.71 m)
- Position: Full-back

Senior career*
Years	Team	Apps	(Gls)
1924	Hebden Bridge		
1925–1938	Stoke City	338	(0)
1938	Crewe Alexandra	3	(0)
Total		341	(0)
- * Club domestic league appearances and goals

William Spencer (15 May 1902 – 1969) was an English footballer who played in the Football League for Crewe Alexandra and Stoke City.

== Career ==
Spencer was born in Nelson and played amateur for West Riding League side Hebden Bridge whilst working in a mill. He joined Stoke City in December 1924, turning professional in April 1925. Spencer replaced the long-serving Alec Milne midway through the 1925–26 season slotting into a leaky defence and relegation to the Third Division was unavoidable. Stoke won the Third Division North title in 1926–27 with Spencer forming a formidable partnership with Bob McGrory. Spencer's positional play complemented McGrory's tough-tackling, however despite their on-field empathy it was rumoured that the pair did not get along off it with Spencer easily riled by McGrory's stubbornness. Despite any-off the pitch frictions the partnership lasted for ten seasons although they both missed most of the 1931–32 season due to injury, Spencer suffering a broken leg on the opening day of the season against Chesterfield.

After recovering from his injury he helped Stoke to gain promotion to the First Division in 1932–33. When McGrory became manager in 1935–36 he moved Spencer out to right-back to accommodate the emerging Charlie Scrimshaw and Spencer's form suffered as a result. After losing his place midway through the 1935–36 season to Bill Winstanley, Spencer became a player-coach with the reserves where he spent the next two seasons. He then moved to Crewe Alexandra for £750 in June 1938 when he played just three matches before deciding to retire. In total he played 354 games for Stoke City, without managing to score goal.

Outside of football Spencer was a keen bowls player and was a star player in the North Staffordshire Bowls League. During World War II he was stationed in Carlisle and played in the same army team as Stoke teammate Harry Davies. After the war he ran the Compasses public house in Newcastle-under-Lyme before returning home to coach Nelson before quitting due to the onset of deafness.

== Career statistics ==
Appearances and goals by club, season and competition
Club	Season	League			FA Cup		Total	
Club	Season	Division	Apps	Goals	Apps	Goals	Apps	Goals
Stoke City	1925–26	Second Division	16	0	0	0	16	0
Stoke City	1926–27	Third Division North	36	0	2	0	38	0
Stoke City	1927–28	Second Division	42	0	4	0	46	0
Stoke City	1928–29	Second Division	40	0	1	0	41	0
Stoke City	1929–30	Second Division	40	0	1	0	41	0
Stoke City	1930–31	Second Division	39	0	3	0	42	0
Stoke City	1931–32	Second Division	1	0	0	0	1	0
Stoke City	1932–33	Second Division	37	0	2	0	39	0
Stoke City	1933–34	First Division	31	0	2	0	33	0
Stoke City	1934–35	First Division	41	0	1	0	42	0
Stoke City	1935–36	First Division	15	0	0	0	15	0
Stoke City	Total		338	0	16	0	354	0
Crewe Alexandra	1938–39	Third Division North	3	0	0	0	3	0
Career total			341	0	16	0	357	0

== Honours ==
with Stoke City

- Football League Third Division North Champions: 1926–27
- Football League Second Division Champions: 1932–33
