= Joe Buller =

English footballer

Personal information
- Full name: Joseph Buller
- Date of birth: 1909
- Place of birth: Durham, England
- Date of death: 1986 (aged 77)
- Position: Right half

Senior career*
Years	Team	Apps	(Gls)
- Chilton Colliery Recreation Athletic
1929–1931	Hartlepools United	86	(2)
1932–1934	Stoke City	6	(0)
1935–1936	Aldershot	22	(0)
Total		114	(2)
- * Club domestic league appearances and goals

Joseph Buller (1909–1986) was a footballer who played in the Football League for Aldershot, Hartlepools United and Stoke City.

== Career ==
Born in Durham, Buller played for Chilton Colliery Recreation Athletic and Hartlepools United before joining Stoke City in 1932. He spent three seasons at the Victoria Ground making just seven appearances and left in 1935 to play for Aldershot.

== Career statistics ==
Appearances and goals by club, season and competition
Club	Season	League			FA Cup		Total	
Club	Season	Division	Apps	Goals	Apps	Goals	Apps	Goals
Hartlepools United	1929–30	Third Division North	31	0	0	0	31	0
Hartlepools United	1930–31	Third Division North	33	0	0	0	33	0
Hartlepools United	1931–32	Third Division North	22	2	0	0	22	2
Hartlepools United	Total		86	2	0	0	86	2
Stoke City	1931–32	Second Division	1	0	0	0	1	0
Stoke City	1932–33	Second Division	3	0	1	0	4	0
Stoke City	1933–34	First Division	1	0	0	0	1	0
Stoke City	1934–35	First Division	1	0	0	0	1	0
Stoke City	Total		6	0	1	0	7	0
Aldershot	1935–36	Third Division South	22	0	0	0	22	0
Career total			114	2	1	0	115	2

== Honours ==
Stoke City

- Football League Second Division champions: 1932–33
