= Bill Wright (footballer, born 1914) =

English footballer (1914–??)

Personal information
- Full name: William Samuel Wright
- Date of birth: 1914
- Place of birth: Hanley, England
- Position: Full-back

Senior career*
Years	Team	Apps	(Gls)
1933–1934	Milton True Blues		
1934–1935	Stoke City	0	(0)
1935–1936	Burton Town		
1936–1937	Port Vale	0	(0)
1937–1938	Glentoran		
1938–1939	Barrow	1	(0)
Total		1+	(0+)
- * Club domestic league appearances and goals

William Samuel Wright (born 1914) was an English professional footballer who played as a full-back.

== Career statistics ==
Appearances and goals by club, season and competition
Club	Season	League			FA Cup		Total	
Club	Season	Division	Apps	Goals	Apps	Goals	Apps	Goals
Stoke City	1934–35	First Division	0	0	0	0	0	0
Port Vale	1936–37	Third Division North	0	0	0	0	0	0
Barrow	1938–39	Third Division North	1	0	0	0	1	0
