= Billy Burns (footballer) =

English footballer

Personal information
- Full name: William Burns
- Date of birth: 1907
- Place of birth: Durham, England
- Position: Forward

Senior career*
Years	Team	Apps	(Gls)
- Crook Town
1930–1931	Stoke City	3	(2)
1931	Stockport County	6	(0)
1932	Rotherham United	0	(0)
- * Club domestic league appearances and goals

William Burns (1907 – after 1931) was a footballer who played in the Football League for Stockport County and Stoke City.

== Career ==
Burns was born in Durham and played for Crook Town before joining Stoke in 1930. He scored twice on his debut against Preston North End but was never given a chance by Tom Mather and left for Stockport County at the end of the 1930–31 season. He played six matches for Stockport and had a failed spell with Rotherham United and so Burns decided to pursue a different career.

== Career statistics ==
Club	Season	League			FA Cup		Total	
Club	Season	Division	Apps	Goals	Apps	Goals	Apps	Goals
Stoke City	1930–31	Second Division	3	2	0	0	3	2
Stockport County	1931–32	Third Division North	6	0	0	0	6	0
Career total			9	2	0	0	9	2
