= William Robertson (footballer, born 1907) =

Scottish footballer

Personal information
- Full name: William Seymour Robertson
- Date of birth: 20 April 1907
- Place of birth: Falkirk, Scotland
- Date of death: 1980 (aged 72–73)
- Height: 5 ft 8 in (1.73 m)
- Position: Right half

Senior career*
Years	Team	Apps	(Gls)
1925–1927	King's Park	64	(9)
1927–1929	Ayr United	79	(7)
1929–1934	Stoke City	117	(3)
1934–1935	Manchester United	47	(1)
1935–1936	Reading	24	(0)
Total		188	(4)
- * Club domestic league appearances and goals

William Seymour Robertson (20 April 1907 – 1980) was a Scottish footballer who played at right half. He played for King's Park, Ayr United, Stoke City, Manchester United, and Reading.

== Career ==
Robertson was born in Falkirk and played for King's Park and Ayr United before joining English side Stoke City in August 1929. It took him until 1930–31 to establish himself in Tom Mather's first team playing in 23 matches. He made the right half position his own in 1931–32 missing just two matches and then played in 40 matches in 1932–33 as Stoke won the Second Division title. After playing in 11 Football League First Division games in 1933–34 Robertson lost his place to the younger Arthur Tutin and he was sold to Manchester United in March 1934. He helped the club avoid relegation to the Third Division North and played 39 matches in 1934–35 as the "Red Devils" finished in 5th place. He only played once in 1935–36 losing his place to James Brown and was sold to Third Division South side Reading. He spent two seasons at Elm Park making 24 appearances before retiring.

== Career statistics ==
Appearances and goals by club, season and competition
Club	Season	League			FA Cup		Total	
Club	Season	Division	Apps	Goals	Apps	Goals	Apps	Goals
Stoke City	1929–30	Second Division	9	1	0	0	9	1
Stoke City	1930–31	Second Division	20	1	3	0	23	1
Stoke City	1931–32	Second Division	38	1	5	0	43	1
Stoke City	1932–33	Second Division	39	0	1	0	40	0
Stoke City	1933–34	First Division	11	0	0	0	11	0
Stoke City	Total		117	3	9	0	126	3
Manchester United	1933–34	Second Division	10	0	0	0	10	0
Manchester United	1934–35	Second Division	36	1	3	0	39	1
Manchester United	1935–36	Second Division	1	0	0	0	1	0
Manchester United	Total		47	1	3	0	50	1
Reading	1935–36	Third Division South	7	0	0	0	7	0
Reading	1936–37	Third Division South	17	0	0	0	17	0
Reading	Total		24	0	0	0	24	0
Career total			188	4	12	0	200	4

== Honours ==
Ayr United

- Scottish Division Two champions: 1927–28

Stoke City

- Football League Second Division champions: 1932–33

Manchester United

- Football League Second Division champions: 1935–36
