= Jack Lewis (footballer, born 1912) =

Welsh footballer

Personal information
- Full name: John E. Lewis
- Date of birth: 1912
- Place of birth: Porthcawl, Wales
- Position: Left half

Senior career*
Years	Team	Apps	(Gls)
- Trethomas
- Merthyr Town
1934–1935	Stoke City	2	(0)
- * Club domestic league appearances and goals

John E. Lewis (1912 – unknown) was a Welsh footballer who played in the English Football League for Stoke City.

== Career ==
Lewis was born in Porthcawl and played for Trethomas and Merthyr Town before joining Stoke City in 1934. He was used mainly in the reserves during his time at the Victoria Ground and only made two first appearances in 1934–35 both coming away from home firstly against Blackburn Rovers in September and then Aston Villa in March.

== Career statistics ==
Appearances and goals by club, season and competition
Club	Season	League			FA Cup		Total	
Club	Season	Division	Apps	Goals	Apps	Goals	Apps	Goals
Stoke City	1934–35	First Division	2	0	0	0	2	0
Career Total			2	0	0	0	2	0
