= William Cook (footballer) =

English footballer (1907–1968)

Personal information
- Full name: William Cook
- Date of birth: 23 May 1907
- Place of birth: Browney Colliery, England
- Date of death: 7 August 1968 (aged 61)
- Place of death: County Durham, England
- Height: 5 ft 8 in (1.73 m)
- Position: Forward

Senior career*
Years	Team	Apps	(Gls)
- New Brancepeth
- Coxhoe United
- Durham City
1928	Chilton Colliery Recreation Athletic		
- Langley Park
- Willington
1930–193?	Stoke City	0	(0)
- Meadowfield
1932–1933	Darlington	15	(2)
1933–193?	Spennymoor United		
193?–1935	Crook Town		
1935	Gateshead	4	(0)
1935–1936	Horden Colliery Welfare		
1936–193?	City of Durham		
- * Club domestic league appearances and goals

William Cook (23 May 1907 – 7 August 1968) was an English footballer who played as a forward in the Football League for Darlington and Gateshead.

== Life and career ==
Cook was born in 1907 in Browney Colliery, County Durham, a son of Norris William Cook, a deputy overman in a coal mine, and his wife Elizabeth Ann.

He played for clubs including New Brancepeth, Coxhoe United, Durham City, Chilton Colliery Recreation Athletic and Langley Park, and was a team-mate of John Alderson at Willington when both joined Stoke City during the 1930–31 season. Neither represented Stoke in senior competition, and both signed for Darlington in July 1932. Cook made his debut on 31 August, playing at inside right in a 3–1 defeat at home to Gateshead. He kept his place until George Hurst returned to the side at the beginning of October, and made nine more appearances later in the season, playing variously at centre forward and both inside-forward positions. He scored twice: once in a 3–2 win against Hull City in February 1933 and once in a 5–1 defeat of Rochdale in March.

Cook was not retained, and moved into non-league football, first with Spennymoor United and then with Crook Town, where he was "one of the most successful and consistent marksmen in the North-Eastern League [in the 1934–35] season", before returning to the Third Division with Gateshead in 1935. His Gateshead career was interrupted by injury, and he played only four league matches before being allowed to leave on a free transfer in December.

He signed for Horden Colliery Welfare, scored on his first appearance, and a couple of weeks later scored all five, including an eight-minute hat-trick, against Darlington Reserves. Cook continued with Horden to the end of the season, but then moved on to another North-Eastern League club, City of Durham.

He married Nora Ebdon in 1935. The 1939 Register finds the couple with a child, living in Anchorage Terrace, Durham, and records Cook's occupation as motor driver heavy motors insurance agent. His death at the age of 61 was registered in the third quarter of 1968 in the Durham Northern district.
