= Charlie Scrimshaw =

English footballer

Personal information
- Full name: Charles Thomas Scrimshaw
- Date of birth: 3 April 1909
- Place of birth: Derby, England
- Date of death: 4 June 1973 (aged 64)
- Place of death: Stoke-on-Trent, England
- Height: 5 ft 9 1/2 in (1.77 m)
- Position: Full back

Senior career*
Years	Team	Apps	(Gls)
- Hebden Bridge
1929–1938	Stoke City	124	(0)
1938–1939	Middlesbrough	9	(0)
- * Club domestic league appearances and goals

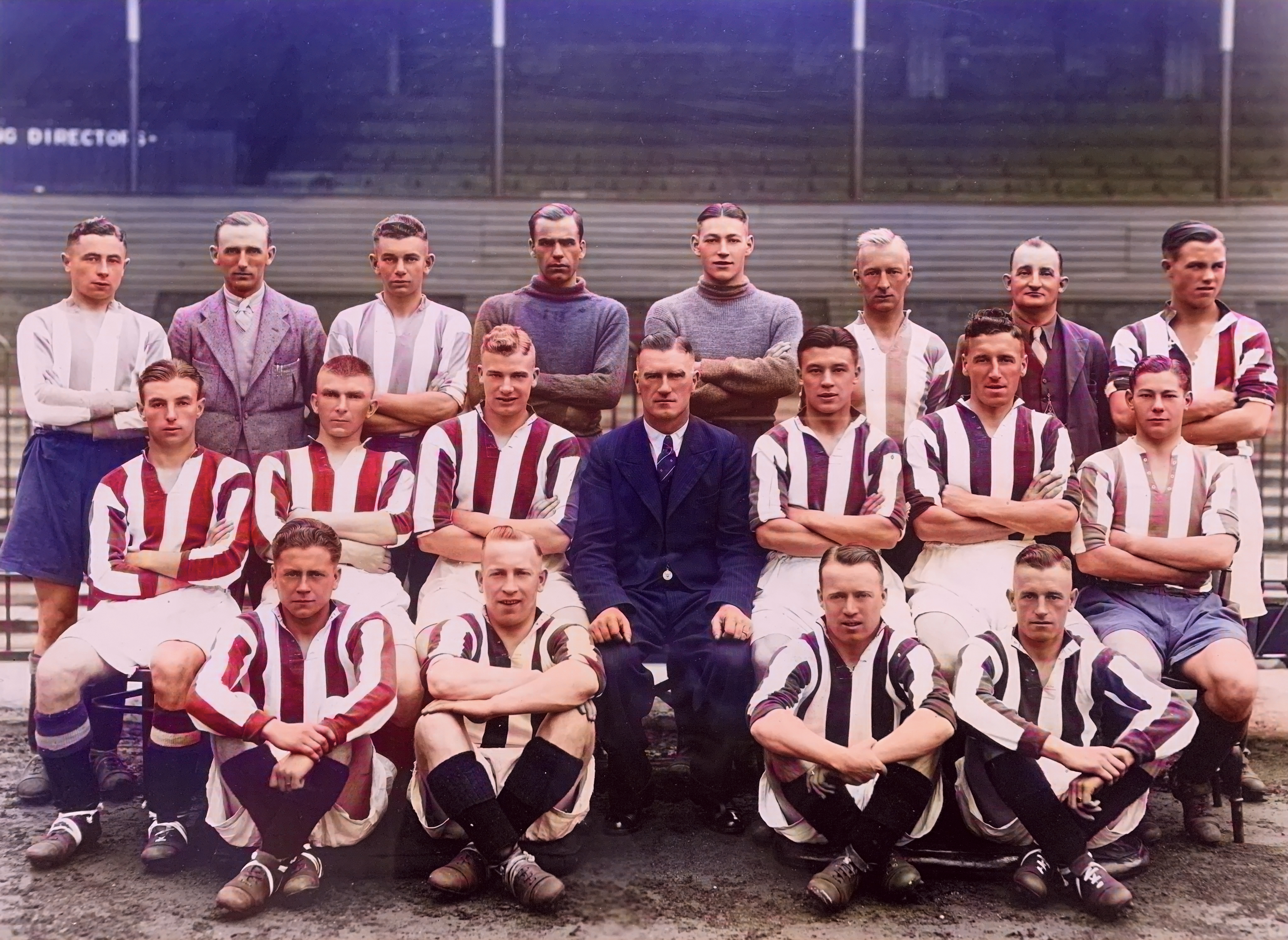
Scrimshaw in the Stoke City team photo 1936–37

Charles Thomas Scrimshaw (3 April 1909 – 4 June 1973) was an English footballer who played in the Football League for Middlesbrough and Stoke City.

== Career ==
Scrimshaw was born in Derby and began his career playing amateur football with Hebden Bridge before joining Stoke City in 1929 as a 20-year-old. He played a regular role in the club's reserve team in the Central League, only appearing for the first team as a replacement for an injured player. It took Scrimshaw six years before he forced his way into the starting eleven mainly due to long-serving full-back Bob McGrory becoming Stoke's manager. Scrimshaw was seen as his replacement and he played in all the club's 47 fixtures in the 1935–36 season and only missed one match in 1936–37.

However, Scrimshaw could not maintain his place in the side, and he decided to leave for regular football. He joined Middlesbrough in October 1938 but only managed nine appearances due to injury. World War II interrupted league football, and during the war leagues, Scrimshaw returned to play for Stoke. He also played eight games as a guest at Port Vale. Also, he guested for Portsmouth. After the war ended and league football resumed Scrimshaw did not continue his footballing career.

== Career statistics ==
Appearances and goals by club, season and competition
Club	Season	League			FA Cup		Total	
Club	Season	Division	Apps	Goals	Apps	Goals	Apps	Goals
Stoke City	1929–30	Second Division	2	0	0	0	2	0
Stoke City	1930–31	Second Division	2	0	0	0	2	0
Stoke City	1931–32	Second Division	0	0	0	0	0	0
Stoke City	1932–33	Second Division	3	0	0	0	3	0
Stoke City	1933–34	First Division	8	0	2	0	10	0
Stoke City	1934–35	First Division	1	0	0	0	1	0
Stoke City	1935–36	First Division	42	0	5	0	47	0
Stoke City	1936–37	First Division	41	0	1	0	42	0
Stoke City	1937–38	First Division	21	0	0	0	21	0
Stoke City	1938–39	First Division	4	0	0	0	4	0
Stoke City	Total		124	0	8	0	132	0
Middlesbrough	1938–39	First Division	9	0	0	0	9	0
Career total			133	0	8	0	141	0

== Honours ==
Stoke City

- Football League Second Division: 1932–33
