= Tim Maloney (footballer) =

English footballer

Personal information
- Full name: Timothy George Maloney
- Date of birth: 9 December 1908
- Place of birth: Middlesbrough, England
- Date of death: 1966 (aged 57–58)
- Position: Winger

Senior career*
Years	Team	Apps	(Gls)
1924–1925	Grangetown		
1924–1925	South Bank		
1926–1927	Middlesbrough	0	(0)
1927–1928	Hull City	0	(0)
1928–1929	Darlington	13	(4)
1931–1932	Stoke City	8	(1)
1932	South Bank		
Total		21	(5)
- * Club domestic league appearances and goals

Timothy George Maloney (9 December 1908 – 1966) was a footballer who played in the Football League for Darlington and Stoke City.

== Career ==
Maloney played non-league football for Grangetown and South Bank before joining his local league club Middlesbrough in 1926. He failed to make an appearance for Boro and joined Hull City a year later however again failed to make his mark and so joined Darlington. He showed his abilities for "Darlo" scoring four goals in thirteen matches from the wing position which prompted Stoke City to sign him in 1931. However he never impressed and after eight appearances and one goal in 1931–32, Maloney was released and he re-joined South Bank.

== Career statistics ==
Club	Season	League			FA Cup		Total	
Club	Season	Division	Apps	Goals	Apps	Goals	Apps	Goals
Darlington	1929–30	Third Division North	13	4	0	0	13	4
Stoke City	1931–32	Second Division	8	1	0	0	8	1
Career total			21	5	0	0	21	5
