= Harry Ware =

English footballer (1911–1970)

Personal information
- Full name: Harry Ware
- Date of birth: 22 October 1911
- Place of birth: Birmingham, England
- Date of death: 28 October 1970 (aged 59)
- Place of death: Stoke-on-Trent, England
- Height: 5 ft 11 in (1.80 m)
- Position: Forward

Youth career
- Hanley St.Luke's
- Stoke St. Peter's

Senior career*
Years	Team	Apps	(Gls)
1930–1934	Stoke City	53	(15)
1935–1936	Newcastle United	44	(9)
1937	Sheffield Wednesday	12	(1)
1937–1945	Norwich City	43	(13)
- Northwich Victoria
Total		152	(38)

Managerial career
- 1947–1948: Northwich Victoria
- 1949–1951: Northwich Victoria
- 1952–1953: Northwich Victoria
- 1958–1960: Crewe Alexandra
- * Club domestic league appearances and goals

Harry Ware (22 October 1911 – 28 October 1970) was an English football player and manager. A forward, he played for Newcastle United, Norwich City, Sheffield Wednesday and Stoke City and managed Crewe Alexandra and Northwich Victoria.

== Playing career ==
Ware was born in Birmingham before his family moved to Stoke-on-Trent. Ware played for Hanley St.Luke's and Stoke St. Peter's before joining Stoke City in 1930 and made his debut at the Victoria Ground against Burnley on 4 October 1930. He scored twice in eight matches in 1931–32 and then scored seven goals in 31 matches in 1932–33, helping Stoke to win the Second Division. Ware struggled to establish himself in the First Division and was sold to Newcastle United in the summer of 1935. He spent two seasons on Tyneside, scoring nine goals in 49 matches, and then spent three months at Sheffield Wednesday, scoring once. In November 1937 he joined Norwich City until World War II interrupted his career.

In March 1940 he joined Port Vale as a guest, before moving on to Northampton Town, Nottingham Forest, Stoke City, Crystal Palace and Watford, returning to Vale for two more guest appearances in December 1944, before joining Northwich Victoria.

== Managerial career ==
After the war, Ware spent three spells in charge of Cheshire County League side Northwich Victoria between 1947 and 1953 and served Dutch side E.D.O. Haarlem as trainer-coach before returning to Burslem in November 1956 to serve Port Vale as a coach under manager Freddie Steele. He left Vale Park in June 1958 to become manager of Crewe Alexandra. He led the "Railwaymen" to 18th and 14th places finishes in the Fourth Division in 1958–59 and 1959–60. He spent 100 games in charge at Gresty Road before leaving in May 1960. He moved on to Stoke City as assistant trainer, then reserve team manager, and finally a scout.

== Career statistics ==
=== Playing statistics ===
Appearances and goals by club, season and competition
Club	Season	League			FA Cup		Total	
Club	Season	Division	Apps	Goals	Apps	Goals	Apps	Goals
Stoke City	1930–31	Second Division	1	0	0	0	1	0
Stoke City	1931–32	Second Division	6	2	2	0	8	2
Stoke City	1932–33	Second Division	29	7	2	0	31	7
Stoke City	1933–34	First Division	13	4	0	0	13	4
Stoke City	1934–35	First Division	4	2	0	0	4	2
Stoke City	Total		53	15	4	0	57	15
Newcastle United	1935–36	Second Division	32	9	5	0	37	9
Newcastle United	1936–37	Second Division	12	0	0	0	12	0
Newcastle United	Total		44	9	5	0	49	9
Sheffield Wednesday	1937–38	Second Division	12	1	0	0	12	1
Norwich City	1937–38	Second Division	26	6	1	0	27	6
Norwich City	1938–39	Second Division	18	7	0	0	18	7
Norwich City	1945–46	War League	–		1	1	1	1
Norwich City	Total		44	13	2	1	46	14
Career total			153	38	11	1	164	39

=== Managerial statistics ===
Managerial record by team and tenure
Team	From	To	Record				
Team	From	To	P	W	D	L	Win %
Crewe Alexandra	1 August 1958	31 May 1960	100	36	22	42	36.0
Total			100	36	22	42	36.0

== Honours ==
Stoke City

- Football League Second Division: 1932–33
