= 1934–35 Stoke City F.C. season =

Stoke City
1934–35 season
- Chairman: A. McSherwin
- Manager: Tom Mather
- Stadium: Victoria Ground
- Football League First Division: 10th (42 points)
- FA Cup: Third Round
- Top goalscorer: League: Tommy Sale (24); All: Tommy Sale (24)
- Highest home attendance: 45,349 vs Arsenal (6 October 1934)
- Lowest home attendance: 9,965 vs Huddersfield Town (4 May 1935)
- Average home league attendance: 22,349
Home colours

The 1934–35 season was Stoke City's 35th season in the Football League and the 21st in the First Division.

Stoke had an unprecedented amount of funds available as the chairman announced that they had recorded a £13,422 profit. The results on the pitch were similar to last season this time in reverse order with Stoke having a good first half but a poor second half to the campaign. Stoke finished in 10th position with 42 points.

== Season review ==
=== League ===
Chairman Sherwin went on record in the summer of 1934 by saying never before in its history has the club been in such a good position financially, Stoke had just made a profit of £13,422. There was a considerable talk of more ground improvements to be made to the Victoria Ground, but some fans wanted the money to be spent on the development of younger players.

Stoke started the 1934–35 season by losing 4–1 at Sheffield Wednesday but then quickly made amends by beating Leeds United 8–1 in their opening home match with Stanley Matthews scoring four goals which earned him his first England call up. Another local star to emerge from the youth team was forward Freddie Steele who used to work for Downings Tileries before becoming a professional footballer. Stoke started the campaign well and for one week in October they sat top of the table. They remained in the top five until February but a disappointing run of results towards the end of the season saw them finish in mid-table position of 10th.

=== FA Cup ===
Stoke were embarrassed in this season's FA Cup losing, 4–1, away at Swansea Town.

== Final league table ==
| Pos | Team | Pld | W | D | L | GF | GA | GAv | Pts |
|---|---|---|---|---|---|---|---|---|---|
| 8 | Everton | 42 | 16 | 12 | 14 | 89 | 88 | 1.011 | 44 |
| 9 | West Bromwich Albion | 42 | 17 | 10 | 15 | 83 | 83 | 1.000 | 44 |
| 10 | Stoke City | 42 | 18 | 6 | 18 | 71 | 70 | 1.014 | 42 |
| 11 | Preston North End | 42 | 15 | 12 | 15 | 62 | 67 | 0.925 | 42 |
| 12 | Chelsea | 42 | 16 | 9 | 17 | 73 | 82 | 0.890 | 41 |

Source: World Football
Rules for classification: 1) Points; 2) Goal average; 3) Goals scored

== Results ==
Stoke's score comes first

=== Legend ===
| Win | Draw | Loss |

=== Football League First Division ===
| Match | Date | Opponent | Venue | Result | Attendance | Scorers |
|---|---|---|---|---|---|---|
| 1 | 25 August 1934 | Sheffield Wednesday | A | 1–4 | 18,000 | Liddle |
| 2 | 27 August 1934 | Leeds United | H | 8–1 | 24,555 | Matthews (4), Johnson (2), Sale (2) |
| 3 | 1 September 1934 | Birmingham | H | 2–0 | 29,642 | Sale, Tutin |
| 4 | 3 September 1934 | Leeds United | A | 2–4 | 20,000 | Sale, Liddle |
| 5 | 8 September 1934 | Derby County | A | 2–0 | 18,220 | Sale, Turner |
| 6 | 15 September 1934 | Manchester City | A | 1–3 | 60,000 | Johnson |
| 7 | 22 September 1934 | Middlesbrough | H | 2–0 | 19,768 | Matthews (2) |
| 8 | 29 September 1934 | Blackburn Rovers | A | 1–0 | 10,127 | Davies |
| 9 | 6 October 1934 | Arsenal | H | 2–2 | 45,349 | Sale (2) |
| 10 | 13 October 1934 | Portsmouth | A | 1–0 | 18,000 | Sale |
| 11 | 20 October 1934 | Aston Villa | H | 4–1 | 33,744 | Sale, Johnson, Liddle (2) |
| 12 | 27 October 1934 | Chelsea | A | 2–0 | 25,000 | Sale (2) |
| 13 | 3 November 1934 | Sunderland | H | 0–3 | 27,737 | |
| 14 | 10 November 1934 | Leicester City | A | 3–0 | 25,000 | Sale (2), Matthews |
| 15 | 17 November 1934 | Everton | H | 3–2 | 29,127 | Liddle, Johnson (2) |
| 16 | 24 November 1934 | Grimsby Town | A | 1–3 | 12,125 | Turner (pen) |
| 17 | 1 December 1934 | Preston North End | H | 3–1 | 21,455 | Sale (2), Johnson |
| 18 | 8 December 1934 | Tottenham Hotspur | A | 2–3 | 30,000 | Matthews, Davies |
| 19 | 15 December 1934 | Wolverhampton Wanderers | H | 1–2 | 18,000 | Sale |
| 20 | 22 December 1934 | Huddersfield Town | A | 4–1 | 4,037 | Sale (2), Davies, Liddle |
| 21 | 25 December 1934 | West Bromwich Albion | A | 0–3 | 38,531 | |
| 22 | 26 December 1934 | West Bromwich Albion | H | 3–0 | 18,219 | Liddle, Johnson, Steele |
| 23 | 29 December 1934 | Sheffield Wednesday | H | 1–1 | 19,387 | Liddle |
| 24 | 5 January 1935 | Birmingham | A | 0–0 | 30,000 | |
| 25 | 19 January 1935 | Derby County | H | 1–1 | 25,006 | Liddle |
| 26 | 26 January 1935 | Manchester City | H | 2–0 | 24,453 | Ware, Johnson |
| 27 | 2 February 1935 | Middlesbrough | A | 0–2 | 12,000 | |
| 28 | 9 February 1935 | Blackburn Rovers | H | 3–1 | 20,646 | Davies, Sale (2) |
| 29 | 20 February 1935 | Arsenal | A | 0–2 | 30,529 | |
| 30 | 23 February 1935 | Portsmouth | H | 1–2 | 15,014 | Johnson |
| 31 | 2 March 1935 | Aston Villa | A | 1–4 | 25,000 | Johnson |
| 32 | 9 March 1935 | Chelsea | H | 0–1 | 13,186 | |
| 33 | 16 March 1935 | Sunderland | A | 1–4 | 30,000 | Ware |
| 34 | 23 March 1935 | Leicester City | H | 3–0 | 15,000 | Matthews (2), Turner (pen) |
| 35 | 30 March 1935 | Everton | A | 0–5 | 20,346 | |
| 36 | 6 April 1935 | Grimsby Town | H | 0–0 | 13,439 | |
| 37 | 13 April 1935 | Preston North End | A | 2–5 | 13,000 | Robson (2) |
| 38 | 19 April 1935 | Liverpool | A | 0–5 | 20,000 | |
| 39 | 20 April 1935 | Tottenham Hotspur | H | 4–1 | 11,653 | Sale (3), Liddle |
| 40 | 22 April 1935 | Liverpool | H | 1–1 | 20,305 | Sale |
| 41 | 27 April 1935 | Wolverhampton Wanderers | A | 1–2 | 17,489 | Almond |
| 42 | 4 May 1935 | Huddersfield Town | H | 2–0 | 9,965 | Davies, Turner (pen) |

=== FA Cup ===
| Round | Date | Opponent | Venue | Result | Attendance | Scorers |
|---|---|---|---|---|---|---|
| R3 | 1 January 1935 | Swansea Town | A | 1–4 | 20,200 | Matthews |

== Squad statistics ==
| Pos. | Name | League | | FA Cup | | Total | |
| Pos. | Name | Apps | Goals | Apps | Goals | Apps | Goals |
|---|---|---|---|---|---|---|---|
| GK | (England) Freddie Houldsworth | 2 | 0 | 0 | 0 | 2 | 0 |
| GK | (England) Norman Lewis | 36 | 0 | 1 | 0 | 37 | 0 |
| GK | (England) Ken Scattergood | 4 | 0 | 0 | 0 | 4 | 0 |
| DF | (England) John Bamber | 3 | 0 | 0 | 0 | 3 | 0 |
| DF | (England) Joe Buller | 1 | 0 | 0 | 0 | 1 | 0 |
| DF | (Scotland) Bob McGrory | 42 | 0 | 1 | 0 | 43 | 0 |
| DF | (England) John Oliver | 0 | 0 | 0 | 0 | 0 | 0 |
| DF | (England) Charlie Scrimshaw | 1 | 0 | 0 | 0 | 1 | 0 |
| DF | (England) Billy Spencer | 41 | 0 | 1 | 0 | 42 | 0 |
| DF | (England) Bill Wright | 0 | 0 | 0 | 0 | 0 | 0 |
| MF | (Wales) Jack Lewis | 2 | 0 | 0 | 0 | 2 | 0 |
| MF | (England) Peter McArdle | 1 | 0 | 0 | 0 | 1 | 0 |
| MF | (England) Wilf Mayer | 1 | 0 | 0 | 0 | 1 | 0 |
| MF | (England) Harry Sellars | 40 | 0 | 1 | 0 | 41 | 0 |
| MF | (England) Arthur Turner | 39 | 4 | 1 | 0 | 40 | 4 |
| MF | (England) Arthur Tutin | 41 | 1 | 1 | 0 | 42 | 1 |
| FW | (England) John Almond | 1 | 1 | 0 | 0 | 1 | 1 |
| FW | (England) Harry Davies | 35 | 5 | 1 | 0 | 36 | 5 |
| FW | (England) Joe Johnson | 38 | 11 | 1 | 0 | 39 | 11 |
| FW | (England) Bobby Liddle | 38 | 10 | 1 | 0 | 39 | 10 |
| FW | (England) Stanley Matthews | 36 | 10 | 1 | 1 | 37 | 11 |
| FW | (England) Charlie Middleton | 0 | 0 | 0 | 0 | 0 | 0 |
| FW | (England) Billy Robson | 3 | 2 | 0 | 0 | 3 | 2 |
| FW | (England) Tommy Sale | 35 | 24 | 1 | 0 | 36 | 24 |
| FW | (England) Frank Soo | 9 | 0 | 0 | 0 | 9 | 0 |
| FW | (England) Freddie Steele | 9 | 1 | 0 | 0 | 9 | 1 |
| FW | (England) Harry Ware | 4 | 2 | 0 | 0 | 4 | 2 |
