= 1929–30 Stoke City F.C. season =

Stoke City
1929–30 season
- Chairman: Mr A.McSherwin
- Manager: Tom Mather
- Stadium: Victoria Ground
- Football League Second Division: 11th (40 Points)
- FA Cup: Third Round
- Top goalscorer: League: Charlie Wilson (20); All: Charlie Wilson (20)
- Highest home attendance: 19,013 vs Cardiff City (14 September 1929)
- Lowest home attendance: 5,369 vs Nottingham Forest (15 March 1930)
- Average home league attendance: 11,523
Home colours

The 1929–30 season was Stoke City's 30th season in the Football League and the tenth in the Second Division.

With the 1920s, which had seen Stoke hit the highs of the First Division and lows of the Third Division, coming to an end there was hope around the city that the club could regain its top-flight status. The Victoria Ground was improved again and could now hold 50,000. Despite a good start to the season with 15 points collected from the first 12 matches Stoke could not maintain a promotion challenge and finished in mid-table.

== Season review ==
=== League ===
With the 1920s now drawing to a close there were high hopes that, after three seasons of reasonable success on the pitch, a return to the First Division could be imminent. Tom Mather was proving to be a fine manager, who with little or no resources, had built a team good enough to compete with the best in the country. The bad feeling surrounding the sale of Harry Davies was slowly receding and two new forwards emerged, Wilf Kirkham from Port Vale and Wilf Chadwick from Wolverhampton Wanderers.

The 1929–30 season was launched with a ceremony at the Victoria Ground which saw the Football League vice-president Mr C. Sutcliffe, officially declare open the new covered accommodation on the Butler Street stand for 12,000 spectators, bringing the overall number of fans under cover up to 20,000. At this time it was considered that the Victoria Ground was only second in the country to Liverpool's Anfield with the total capacity now at 50,000.

With Dick Williams still in goal and Bob McGrory and Billy Spencer at full back, Stoke started the season well and after twelve matches they lay second in the table. However Stoke could not maintain their challenge as they were robbed of key players through injury mainly McGrory whose leadership was sorely missed and in the end Stoke settled for a position in mid table.

=== FA Cup ===
Stoke suffered great misfortune in the FA Cup as in the third round they were leading Doncaster Rovers 3–2 up until 76 minutes when the match was called off due to heavy snow fall. In the 'replay' Doncaster won 1–0.

== Final league table ==
Pos	Team	Pld	W	D	L	GF	GA	GAv	Pts
9	Wolverhampton Wanderers	42	16	9	17	77	79	0.975	41
10	Nottingham Forest	42	13	15	14	55	69	0.797	41
11	Stoke City	42	16	8	18	74	72	1.028	40
12	Tottenham Hotspur	42	15	9	18	59	61	0.967	39
13	Charlton Athletic	42	14	11	17	59	63	0.937	39

Rules for classification: 1) Points; 2) Goal average; 3) Goals scored

== Results ==
Stoke's score comes first

=== Legend ===
Win	Draw	Loss

=== Football League Second Division ===
Match	Date	Opponent	Venue	Result	Attendance	Scorers
1	31 August 1929	Bradford City	H	2–0	16,568	Wilson, Archibald
2	2 September 1929	Charlton Athletic	H	2–1	10,000	Wilson, Chadwick
3	7 September 1929	Swansea Town	A	2–2	12,136	Wilson, Bussey
4	9 September 1929	Charlton Athletic	A	4–4	20,000	Wilson, Bussey (2), Cull
5	14 September 1929	Cardiff City	H	1–1	19,013	Wilson
6	21 September 1929	Preston North End	A	1–5	8,000	Kirkham
7	28 September 1929	Bristol City	H	6–2	13,492	Kirkham, Wilson (3), Cull, Mawson
8	30 September 1929	Wolverhampton Wanderers	H	3–0	6,648	Kirkham, Mawson, Archibald
9	5 October 1929	Notts County	A	3–3	7,000	Wilson, Liddle (2)
10	9 October 1929	Tottenham Hotspur	A	1–3	12,000	Wilson
11	12 October 1929	Reading	H	2–2	15,853	Wilson, Kirkham
12	19 October 1929	Southampton	H	4–0	14,666	Kirkham, Sellars, Mawson, Williamson
13	26 October 1929	Millwall	A	1–2	8,000	Mawson
14	2 November 1929	Oldham Athletic	H	0–2	15,840	
15	9 November 1929	Nottingham Forest	A	1–2	6,000	Chadwick
16	16 November 1929	Chelsea	H	1–1	8,000	Robertson
17	23 November 1929	Bury	A	0–2	5,000	
18	30 November 1929	Blackpool	H	0–1	11,546	
19	7 December 1929	Barnsley	A	1–3	9,058	Liddle
20	14 December 1929	Bradford Park Avenue	H	2–1	8,881	Shirley (2)
21	21 December 1929	West Bromwich Albion	A	3–2	11,809	Shirley, Wilson (2)
22	25 December 1929	Hull City	A	0–3	6,000	
23	26 December 1929	Hull City	H	3–1	11,553	Shirley, Williamson, Mawson
24	28 December 1929	Bradford City	A	0–3	12,000	
25	4 January 1930	Swansea Town	H	0–1	6,640	
26	18 January 1930	Cardiff City	A	2–1	10,124	Wilson, Bussey
27	25 January 1930	Preston North End	H	2–3	10,325	Wilson, Archibald
28	1 February 1930	Bristol City	A	6–2	10,022	Wilson (4) (1 Pen), Bussey, Kirkham
29	8 February 1930	Notts County	H	1–1	8,583	Kirkham
30	15 February 1930	Reading	A	0–0	5,175	
31	22 February 1930	Southampton	A	1–2	10,000	Armitage (pen)
32	1 March 1930	Millwall	H	1–0	8,987	Wilson
33	8 March 1930	Oldham Athletic	A	0–5	17,749	
34	15 March 1930	Nottingham Forest	H	6–0	5,369	Kirkham (3), Williamson, Sellars, Bussey
35	22 March 1930	Chelsea	A	2–3	35,000	Kirkham (2)
36	29 March 1930	Bury	H	1–0	10,019	Liddle
37	5 April 1930	Blackpool	A	2–0	9,959	Kirkham, Sellars
38	12 April 1930	Barnsley	H	3–0	7,431	Kirkham, Armitage (pen), Liddle
39	19 April 1930	Bradford Park Avenue	A	2–3	6,700	Liddle, Archibald
40	21 April 1930	Wolverhampton Wanderers	A	1–2	18,092	Kirkham
41	26 April 1930	West Bromwich Albion	H	0–3	8,012	
42	3 May 1930	Tottenham Hotspur	H	1–0	6,570	Cull

=== FA Cup ===
Round	Date	Opponent	Venue	Result	Attendance	Scorers
R3	11 January 1930	Doncaster Rovers	A	3–2	13,224	Abandoned after 76 minutes
R3	16 January 1930	Doncaster Rovers	A	0–1	7,748	

== Squad statistics ==
Pos.	Name	League		FA Cup		Total	
Pos.	Name	Apps	Goals	Apps	Goals	Apps	Goals
GK	(England) Dave Beswick	1	0	0	0	1	0
GK	(England) Norman Lewis	17	0	1	0	18	0
GK	(England) Dick Williams	24	0	0	0	24	0
DF	(England) Arthur Beachill	20	0	1	0	21	0
DF	(England) Tommy Dawson	3	0	0	0	3	0
DF	(Scotland) Bob McGrory	21	0	0	0	21	0
DF	(England) Charlie Scrimshaw	2	0	0	0	2	0
DF	(England) Billy Spencer	40	0	1	0	41	0
DF	(England) Harry Watson	2	0	0	0	2	0
MF	(England) Len Armitage	30	2	1	0	31	2
MF	(Scotland) Thomas Godfrey	1	0	0	0	1	0
MF	(England) Peter Jackson	6	0	0	0	6	0
MF	(Scotland) William Robertson	9	1	0	0	9	1
MF	(England) Harry Sellars	40	3	1	0	41	3
MF	Paddy Turley	1	0	0	0	1	0
MF	(Scotland) Tom Williamson	37	3	1	0	38	3
FW	(Scotland) Bobby Archibald	40	4	1	0	41	4
FW	(England) Walter Bussey	31	6	1	0	32	6
FW	(England) Wilf Chadwick	7	2	1	0	8	2
FW	(England) John Cull	22	3	1	0	23	3
FW	(England) Wilf Kirkham	27	15	0	0	27	15
FW	(England) Bobby Liddle	25	6	0	0	25	6
FW	(England) Joe Mawson	11	5	0	0	11	5
FW	(England) John Shirley	14	4	0	0	14	4
FW	(England) Harold Taylor	4	0	0	0	4	0
FW	(England) Charlie Wilson	27	20	1	0	28	20
