= John McDaid =

Irish footballer

Personal information
- Full name: John McDaid
- Date of birth: 1909
- Place of birth: Derry, Ireland
- Position: Inside right

Senior career*
Years	Team	Apps	(Gls)
1928–1929	Drumcondra		
1929–1930	Heptonstall		
1930–1932	Stoke City	4	(0)
1932	Crusaders		
- * Club domestic league appearances and goals

John McDaid (1909 – unknown) was an Irish footballer who played in the Football League for Stoke City.

== Career ==
Born in Derry, Ireland McDaid played football for Drumcondra and Heptonstall, before being given a chance at Stoke City. He made just four appearances for Stoke over two years and moved back to Ireland with Crusaders.

== Career statistics ==
Club	Season	League			FA Cup		Total	
Club	Season	Division	Apps	Goals	Apps	Goals	Apps	Goals
Stoke City	1930–31	Second Division	1	0	0	0	1	0
Stoke City	1931–32	Second Division	3	0	0	0	3	0
Career Total			4	0	0	0	4	0
