= Harry Sellars =

English footballer and manager

Personal information
- Full name: Harry Sellars
- Date of birth: 9 April 1902
- Place of birth: Beamish, Durham, England
- Date of death: 30 December 1978 (aged 76)
- Place of death: Stoke-on-Trent, England
- Position: Half-back

Senior career*
Years	Team	Apps	(Gls)
1919–1921	Darlington	0	(0)
1922	Leadgate Park		
1923–1935	Stoke City	370	(18)
1937–1938	Congleton Town	36	(0)
1938	Port Vale	0	(0)
Total		406	(18)

Managerial career
- 1947: Dundalk
- * Club domestic league appearances and goals

Harry Sellars (9 April 1902 – 30 December 1978) was an English footballer and football manager, who played in the English Football League for Stoke City. He made 395 appearances for Stoke in all competitions, and helped the club to win the Third Division North title in 1926–27 and the Second Division title in 1932–33. He went on to briefly manage League of Ireland side Dundalk in 1947. His son John also played for Stoke in the 1950s. Together, father and son played 808 league and cup games for the club.

== Playing career ==
Sellars was born in Beamish, Durham and joined his local club Darlington as an amateur in 1919. The "Quakers" found him a job cleaning train carriage windows an improvement on his previous employment as a miner. Sellars turned down a trial at Manchester United in favour of turning professional with ambitious Northern League club Leadgate Park who offered him £2 a week. He was recommended to several Football League clubs by various scouts and Stoke City manager Tom Mather signed him on 15 December 1923. He began his Stoke career at inside-left and scored on his debut against Clapton Orient on 26 January 1924. He was in and out of the side in the next three seasons before Sellars converted to half-back in 1925–26 as Stoke were relegated to the Third Division North. A strong half-back line with Sellars, Cecil Eastwood and Tom Williamson helped Stoke win the title and return to the Second Division.

He became a steady and consistent performer for Stoke. He helped them win promotion to the First Division in 1932–33. He remained in the side until he injured his knee in September 1935, which allowed Frank Soo to take his place. In total, Sellars made 395 appearances, scoring 19 goals, for Stoke in a 13-year career at the Victoria Ground. He then helped Congleton Town to win the Cheshire Senior Cup. He had a short spell at Port Vale (without playing a first-team game). During World War II, he worked at the PMT bus in depot in Hanley, and once the war was over, he returned to Stoke to become Bob McGrory's assistant manager and first-team coach. In his role he helped to train his son John.

== Managerial career ==
Sellars was recruited to manage League of Ireland side Dundalk at the start of the 1947–48, before he agreed to a mutual termination of his contract in October 1947.

== Career statistics ==
Appearances and goals by club, season and competition
Club	Season	League			FA Cup		Total	
Club	Season	Division	Apps	Goals	Apps	Goals	Apps	Goals
Stoke City	1923–24	Second Division	8	4	0	0	8	4
Stoke City	1924–25	Second Division	8	1	1	0	9	1
Stoke City	1925–26	Second Division	13	2	0	0	13	2
Stoke City	1926–27	Third Division North	30	0	3	0	33	0
Stoke City	1927–28	Second Division	33	3	4	0	37	3
Stoke City	1928–29	Second Division	40	0	1	0	41	0
Stoke City	1929–30	Second Division	40	3	1	0	41	3
Stoke City	1930–31	Second Division	33	1	3	0	36	1
Stoke City	1931–32	Second Division	42	1	5	1	47	2
Stoke City	1932–33	Second Division	39	2	2	0	41	2
Stoke City	1933–34	First Division	38	1	4	0	42	1
Stoke City	1934–35	First Division	40	0	1	0	41	0
Stoke City	1935–36	First Division	6	0	0	0	6	0
Stoke City	Total		370	18	25	1	395	19
Port Vale	1937–38	Third Division North	0	0	0	0	0	0

== Honours ==
Stoke City

- Football League Third Division North: 1926–27
- Football League Second Division: 1932–33
