= Roy John (footballer) =

Welsh footballer (1911–1973)

Personal information
- Full name: William Ronald John
- Date of birth: 29 January 1911
- Place of birth: Briton Ferry, Wales
- Date of death: 12 July 1973 (aged 62)
- Place of death: Port Talbot, Wales
- Position: Goalkeeper

Youth career
- ?–1927: Briton Ferry Athletic

Senior career*
Years	Team	Apps	(Gls)
1927–1928	Swansea Town	0	(0)
1928–1932	Walsall	88	(0)
1932–1934	Stoke City	71	(0)
1934	Preston North End	0	(0)
1934–1936	Sheffield United	29	(0)
1936–1937	Manchester United	15	(0)
1937	Newport County	10	(0)
1937–1939	Swansea Town	40	(0)

International career
1931–1938	Wales	14	(0)
- * Club domestic league appearances and goals

William Ronald "Roy" John (29 January 1911 – 12 July 1973) was a Welsh international footballer who played as a goalkeeper for Manchester United, Newport County, Sheffield United, Stoke City, Swansea Town and Walsall as well as the Wales national team.

== Football career ==
Born in Briton Ferry, John began his career with Briton Ferry Athletic before joining Swansea Town in 1927. At this time he was an outfield player, originally a full-back (where he was "not greatly appreciated") before initially moving forward to play as a half-back, where he gained a reputation as "a resolute tackler with a useful kick". He left Swansea in May 1928, having not played a Football League game for them.

He then joined Walsall, where he played for the reserve side as a half-back. Following the departure of Fred Biddlestone to Aston Villa in January 1930 and an injury to the reserve goalkeeper, manager Sid Scholey asked John to try out for the custodian's shirt. John did so well in a practice match that he was quickly promoted to first-team goalkeeper. Within months he made his international debut, when he played for Wales against Ireland on 22 April 1931. His debut match ended in a 3–2 victory to the Welsh. One writer of the time described him as "dashing and daring – a gay cavalier who laughs fortune in the face".

After 88 league games for Walsall, he was transferred to Stoke City in April 1932, where he was part of the team which won the Football League Second Division title in 1932–33. The local media described John's performances during that season as "simply brilliant". He struggled though in the First Division and was sold to Preston in the summer of 1934. After six months at Preston North End, John moved to Sheffield United in December 1934, for a transfer fee of £1,250. He made 29 League appearances for the Blades, before he was sold to Manchester United in June 1936, for a fee of £600. His debut for the club finished in a 1–1 draw with Wolverhampton Wanderers on 29 August 1936. He transferred to Newport County in March 1937, having made 15 appearances for United.

He moved back to Swansea Town four months after joining Newport. In 1938, he helped Swansea reach the final of the Welsh Cup, where they were defeated by Shrewsbury Town in a replay. He remained at the Vetch Field club until the Second World War cut his career short. He officially retired on 11 November 1939, when he became a hotel manager.

During the war, John guested for several clubs in the north-west of England, including Southport, and in September 1942 he played for a Wales XI against the R.A.F.

== International career ==
John made 14 appearances for Wales in full internationals, helping Wales win the British Home Championship in 1933 and 1934. During his time as the Wales goalkeeper, he alternated with Bert Gray and Len Evans.

== Career statistics ==
=== Club ===
Club	Season	League			FA Cup		Total	
Club	Season	Division	Apps	Goals	Apps	Goals	Apps	Goals
Walsall	1928–29	Third Division North	4	0	0	0	4	0
Walsall	1929–30	Third Division North	10	0	0	0	10	0
Walsall	1930–31	Third Division North	37	0	4	0	41	0
Walsall	1931–32	Third Division North	37	0	1	0	38	0
Walsall	Total		88	0	5	0	93	0
Stoke City	1931–32	Second Division	1	0	0	0	1	0
Stoke City	1932–33	Second Division	40	0	2	0	42	0
Stoke City	1933–34	First Division	30	0	3	0	33	0
Stoke City	Total		71	0	5	0	76	0
Sheffield United	1934–35	Second Division	22	0	2	0	24	0
Sheffield United	1935–36	Second Division	7	0	0	0	7	0
Sheffield United	Total		29	0	2	0	31	0
Manchester United	1936–37	First Division	15	0	0	0	15	0
Newport County	1936–37	Third Division South	10	0	0	0	10	0
Swansea Town	1937–38	Second Division	17	0	0	0	17	0
Swansea Town	1938–39	Second Division	23	0	1	0	24	0
Swansea Town	Total		40	0	1	0	41	0
Career Total			253	0	13	0	267	0

=== International ===
National team	Year	Apps	Goals
Wales	1931	1	0
Wales	1932	3	0
Wales	1933	3	0
Wales	1934	2	0
Wales	1935	1	0
Wales	1936	2	0
Wales	1938	2	0
Total		14	0

== Honours ==
Stoke City

- Football League Second Division champions: 1932–33

Swansea Town

- Welsh Cup finalists: 1938

Wales

- British Home Championship: 1933, 1934
