= Jack Palethorpe =

English footballer

Personal information
- Full name: John Thomas Palethorpe
- Date of birth: 23 November 1909
- Place of birth: Leicester, England
- Date of death: 6 June 1984 (aged 74)
- Place of death: Slough, England
- Height: 5 ft 10 in (1.78 m)
- Position: Centre forward

Youth career
- Maidenhead United

Senior career*
Years	Team	Apps	(Gls)
1930–1933	Reading	59	(54)
1933–1934	Stoke City	21	(11)
1933–1934	Preston North End	24	(15)
1934–1935	Sheffield Wednesday	28	(13)
1935–1936	Aston Villa	6	(2)
1936–1938	Crystal Palace	39	(11)
1938–1939	Chelmsford City	36	(31)
–	Shorts Sports		
–	Colchester United		
Total		213	(137)
- * Club domestic league appearances and goals

John Thomas Palethorpe (23 November 1909 – 6 June 1984) was an English professional footballer who played for Reading, Stoke City, Preston North End, Sheffield Wednesday, Aston Villa and Crystal Palace. He was a tall centre forward who scored 106 League goals (113 including FA Cup) in a career which lasted from 1929 to 1938, making 177 League appearances (197 including FA Cup).

== Playing career ==
=== Early days ===
Palethorpe was born in Leicester on 23 November 1909 he trained to be a shoemaker before concentrating on football. He played non-League football for Maidenhead United in the Spartan League in the 1929–30 season, scoring a club record 65 goals in 39 appearances in his only full season at York Road, including seven in one match against Wood Green Town.

=== Reading ===
He signed professionally for Reading for the following term and had two good full seasons at Elm Park scoring 54 goals in 59 League appearances. In March 1932 Jack scored a hat-trick in just seven minutes as Reading beat Mansfield Town 7–1. This was a record until Trevor Senior scored three goals in four minutes 50 years later. Jack helped Reading finish runners up in Division Three South in the 1931-32 campaign.

=== Stoke City and Preston North End ===
Towards the end of the 1932–33 season Palethorpe transferred to Stoke City and his eight goals in 10 matches helped them win the Second Division championship and promotion to the First Division. Palethorpe's first taste of top flight football the following season only lasted for 11 games as he switched to Second Division leaders Preston North End who hoped he would do a similar job to what he did at Stoke and guarantee promotion. Palethorpe formed a fine goalscoring partnership with George Stephenson ensuring that Preston gained promotion as runners-up. However the following season he lost his place to Bud Maxwell and in December 1934 he joined Sheffield Wednesday for a fee of £3,100.

=== Sheffield Wednesday ===
Palethorpe gained an immediate place in the Wednesday first team, somewhat controversially replacing the popular Neil Dewar as Wednesday's centre forward. He made his debut on 15 December 1934 against Everton and scored his first goals on Boxing Day, a hat-trick against Birmingham City. In the second half of that season Palethorpe played an integral part in Sheffield Wednesday's excellent run and eventual triumph in the FA Cup of that season scoring goals in the third and fourth rounds as well as one in the semi-final win over Burnley at Villa Park. However his most important goal came in the 4–2 final triumph against West Bromwich Albion when he put Wednesday a goal up inside two minutes after receiving a pass from Ronnie Starling and shooting just inside the post. Despite a good record of 17 goals in 34 matches in all competitions, Palethorpe was once again on his way to another club in September 1935 as he joined Aston Villa for £2,500.

=== Latter career ===
Palethorpe was still only 25 when he joined Villa but his career seemed to be on a slippery slope, he played only six games in thirteen months at Villa as they were relegated from Division One in the 1935–36 season, his absence partly explained by illness which led to hospitalisation prior to a fixture at Preston North End on 18th January 1936. It was reported by the Villa News & Record the following week that he had undergone surgery and was expected to miss the rest of the 1935/36 season. In October 1936 he moved, this time to Third Division Crystal Palace for whom he scored 11 goals in 39 league matches. In 1938 he moved into non-league football again, playing for Chelmsford City, Shorts Sports and Colchester United. He effectively retired from playing in 1939 although he did make some appearances for Colchester in the Wartime Leagues. He later did some coaching at North Town and back at his first club Maidenhead.

Throughout his career, Jack Palethorpe had a reputation for never staying at a football club for any length of time, his longest stint at any one club was two seasons and 59 league appearances at Reading. He had the unusual record of playing for four different First Division clubs (Stoke, Preston, Sheffield Wednesday and Aston Villa) but never actually completing a full season with any one of them. His nickname throughout his career was "SOS" and this may have something to with the Palethorpe Sausage company which he may or may not have been associated with. He had the reputation of having a very good sense of humour and was known as the dressing room comedian. After leaving football he worked for the Fairey Aviation Company. Jack Palethorpe died on 6 June 1984 in Slough aged 74.

== Career statistics ==
Appearances and goals by club, season and competition
Club	Season	League			FA Cup		Total	
Club	Season	Division	Apps	Goals	Apps	Goals	Apps	Goals
Reading	1930–31	Second Division	4	2	0	0	4	2
Reading	1931–32	Third Division South	28	23	1	0	29	23
Reading	1932–33	Third Division South	27	29	6	0	33	29
Reading	Total		59	54	7	0	66	54
Stoke City	1932–33	Second Division	10	8	0	0	10	8
Stoke City	1933–34	First Division	11	3	0	0	11	3
Stoke City	Total		21	11	0	0	21	11
Preston North End	1933–34	Second Division	18	11	2	3	20	14
Preston North End	1934–35	First Division	6	4	0	0	6	4
Preston North End	Total		24	15	2	3	26	18
Sheffield Wednesday	1934–35	First Division	20	8	6	4	26	12
Sheffield Wednesday	1935–36	First Division	8	5	0	0	8	5
Sheffield Wednesday	Total		28	13	6	4	34	17
Aston Villa	1935–36	First Division	6	2	0	0	6	2
Crystal Palace	1936–37	Third Division South	29	8	2	0	31	8
Crystal Palace	1937–38	Third Division South	10	3	3	0	13	3
Crystal Palace	Total		39	11	5	0	44	11
Career Total			177	106	20	7	197	113

== Honours ==
Stoke City

- Football League Second Division: 1932–33

Sheffield Wednesday

- FA Cup: 1934–35
- FA Charity Shield: 1935
