= 1932–33 Stoke City F.C. season =

Stoke City
1932–33 season
- Chairman: Mr A.McSherwin
- Manager: Tom Mather
- Stadium: Victoria Ground
- Football League Second Division: 1st (56 Points)
- FA Cup: Fourth Round
- Top goalscorer: League: Joe Mawson (16); All: Joe Mawson (16)
- Highest home attendance: 29,243 vs Port Vale (22 October 1932)
- Lowest home attendance: 7,962 vs Bradford Park Avenue (18 February 1933)
- Average home league attendance: 15,858
Home colours

The 1932–33 season was Stoke City's 33rd season in the Football League and the 13th in the Second Division.

After almost gaining promotion last season there was great belief that Stoke would finally make a return to the First Division. And they would do so in impressive style, setting a number of records as they finished in 1st place, a point ahead of Tottenham Hotspur to claim the Second Division title.

== Season review ==
=== League ===
After last season's success the main topic amongst the supporters was whether or not their squad of up-and-coming young players was good enough to get Stoke promoted. Mather did not sign anyone during the summer claiming he was happy with his squad and confident that promotion could be gained.

Stoke started the 1932–33 season brilliantly winning 13 from their first 18 matches, with Joe Johnson, Joe Mawson, Bobby Liddle and Stanley Matthews in fine form. No wins in December allowed Tottenham Hotspur to close the gap at the top of the table and they would be destined to be running partners for the rest of the season. Mawson suffered injury towards the end of the season which would ruin his career and Mather brought in Reading forward Jack Palethorpe to fill the gap and he did well scoring eight goals in ten matches.

Stoke produced the goods and with a 5–2 win over Lincoln City they finished top of the table taking the Second Division title in style finishing a point above Tottenham Hotspur and six ahead of third-placed Fulham. Stoke achieved a number of records during a memorable season, such as most wins in the Football League (25), the best goal average in the top two leagues (2.000), the best away record in Division Two, and the best defensive record. Joe Mawson became leading goalscorer for the second season running with 16 goals. During the season Bob McGrory was made coach of the reserve squad and only made a few appearances.

=== FA Cup ===
With Stoke's main goal achieving promotion little pressure was placed on the FA Cup and ultimately they tamely lost 4–1 at Middlesbrough.

== Final league table ==
Pos	Team	Pld	W	D	L	GF	GA	GAv	Pts	Promotion or relegation
1	Stoke City (C, P)	42	25	6	11	78	39	2.000	56	Promotion to the First Division
2	Tottenham Hotspur (P)	42	20	15	7	96	51	1.882	55	Promotion to the First Division
3	Fulham	42	20	10	12	78	65	1.200	50	
4	Bury	42	20	9	13	84	59	1.424	49	
5	Nottingham Forest	42	17	15	10	67	59	1.136	49	

Rules for classification: 1) Points; 2) Goal average; 3) Goals scored
(C) Champions; (P) Promoted

== Results ==
Stoke's score comes first

=== Legend ===
Win	Draw	Loss

=== Football League Second Division ===
Match	Date	Opponent	Venue	Result	Attendance	Scorers
1	27 August 1932	Manchester United	A	2–0	24,996	Mawson (2)
2	29 August 1932	Millwall	H	1–2	13,026	Mawson
3	3 September 1932	Tottenham Hotspur	H	2–0	12,230	Davies (2)
4	5 September 1932	Millwall	A	0–0	10,000	
5	10 September 1932	Grimsby Town	A	1–0	6,000	Ware
6	17 September 1932	Oldham Athletic	H	4–0	13,528	Mawson (2), Johnson (2)
7	24 September 1932	Preston North End	A	3–1	10,000	Turner, Mawson, Ware
8	1 October 1932	Burnley	H	3–0	12,583	Johnson (3)
9	8 October 1932	Bradford Park Avenue	A	2–2	8,000	Turner, Mawson
10	15 October 1932	Plymouth Argyle	H	2–0	10,156	Mawson (2)
11	22 October 1932	Port Vale	H	1–0	29,243	Johnson
12	29 October 1932	Notts County	A	4–3	8,500	Liddle, Mawson (2), Johnson
13	5 November 1932	Swansea Town	H	2–0	15,268	Davies, Johnson
14	12 November 1932	Southampton	A	0–1	10,000	
15	19 November 1932	West Ham United	H	0–0	11,069	
16	26 November 1932	Fulham	A	3–1	25,000	Turner, Sale, Mawson
17	3 December 1932	Chesterfield	H	2–1	12,102	Davies, Johnson
18	10 December 1932	Lincoln City	A	3–2	4,500	Mawson, Johnson, Sale
19	17 December 1932	Bury	H	2–3	13,521	Turner, Sale
20	24 December 1932	Bradford City	A	1–1	7,500	Sale
21	26 December 1932	Nottingham Forest	H	0–1	22,279	
22	27 December 1932	Nottingham Forest	A	0–1	13,000	
23	31 December 1932	Manchester United	H	0–0	14,115	
24	7 January 1933	Tottenham Hotspur	A	2–3	20,000	Liddle, Ware
25	21 January 1933	Grimsby Town	H	2–0	8,421	Mawson, Johnson
26	31 January 1933	Oldham Athletic	A	4–0	3,908	Johnson (2), Ware, Salmon
27	4 February 1933	Preston North End	H	1–1	12,750	Sale
28	11 February 1933	Burnley	A	2–1	12,228	Sellars, Mawson
29	18 February 1933	Bradford Park Avenue	H	4–0	7,962	Sellars, Liddle, Mawson, Ware
30	25 February 1933	Plymouth Argyle	A	0–1	8,000	
31	4 March 1933	Port Vale	A	3–1	19,484	Johnson, Ware, Matthews
32	11 March 1933	Notts County	H	0–2	14,223	
33	18 March 1933	Swansea Town	A	2–0	7,000	Palethorpe (2)
34	25 March 1933	Southampton	H	3–1	18,891	Sale, Jackson, Palethorpe
35	1 April 1933	West Ham United	A	2–1	10,000	Sale, Palethorpe
36	8 April 1933	Fulham	H	0–1	17,000	
37	14 April 1933	Charlton Athletic	A	0–1	10,000	
38	15 April 1933	Chesterfield	A	2–1	8,000	Sale, Palethorpe
39	17 April 1933	Charlton Athletic	H	2–0	22,341	Liddle, Palethorpe
40	22 April 1933	Lincoln City	H	5–2	19,998	Liddle, Sale (2), Palethorpe, Ware
41	29 April 1933	Bury	A	2–3	8,790	Johnson, Palethorpe
42	6 May 1933	Bradford City	H	4–1	17,380	Turner, Liddle (2), Sale

=== FA Cup ===
Round	Date	Opponent	Venue	Result	Attendance	Scorers
R3	14 January 1933	Southampton	H	1–0	18,526	Davies
R4	28 January 1933	Middlesbrough	A	1–4	25,000	Liddle

== Squad statistics ==
Pos.	Name	League		FA Cup		Total	
Pos.	Name	Apps	Goals	Apps	Goals	Apps	Goals
GK	(England) Dave Beswick	2	0	0	0	2	0
GK	(Wales) Roy John	40	0	2	0	42	0
DF	(England) Arthur Beachill	36	0	2	0	38	0
DF	(England) Joe Buller	3	0	1	0	4	0
DF	(Scotland) Bob McGrory	8	0	0	0	8	0
DF	(England) Charlie Scrimshaw	3	0	0	0	3	0
DF	(England) Billy Spencer	37	0	2	0	39	0
MF	(England) Jack Hartshorne	0	0	0	0	0	0
MF	(England) Peter Jackson	3	1	0	0	3	1
MF	(Scotland) William Robertson	39	0	1	0	40	0
MF	(England) Henry Salmon	3	1	0	0	3	1
MF	(England) Harry Sellars	39	2	2	0	41	2
MF	(England) Arthur Turner	42	5	2	0	44	5
FW	(England) Walter Bussey	1	0	0	0	1	0
FW	(England) Harry Davies	31	4	2	1	33	5
FW	(England) Joe Johnson	41	15	2	0	43	15
FW	(England) Bobby Liddle	33	7	2	1	35	8
FW	(England) Stanley Matthews	15	1	0	0	15	1
FW	(England) Joe Mawson	26	16	2	0	28	16
FW	(England) Jack Palethorpe	10	8	0	0	10	8
FW	(England) Tommy Sale	21	11	0	0	21	11
FW	(England) Harry Ware	29	7	2	0	31	7
