= Tommy Sale =

English footballer

Personal information
- Full name: Thomas Sale
- Date of birth: 30 April 1910
- Place of birth: Stoke-on-Trent, England
- Date of death: 10 November 1990 (aged 80)
- Place of death: Stafford, England
- Height: 5 ft 11 in (1.80 m)
- Position: Forward

Youth career
- 1929–1930: Stoke City

Senior career*
Years	Team	Apps	(Gls)
1930–1936	Stoke City	161	(75)
1936–1938	Blackburn Rovers	65	(25)
1938–1946	Stoke City	42	(23)
1947	Northwich Victoria		
1948	Hednesford Town		
Total		268	(123)
- * Club domestic league appearances and goals

Thomas Sale (30 April 1910 – 10 November 1990) was an English footballer who played as a forward. Born in Stoke-on-Trent, Sale had two spells at his home town club, Stoke City, amassing 483 appearances, either side of a two-year stint at Blackburn Rovers. Later in his career, he had brief spells at Northwich Victoria and Hednesford Town, during one of these stints he even won a game 44-0, before opting to retire at the age of 39.

== Early life ==
As a fourteen-year-old, Tommy Sale worked in a pottery factory. In conjunction with his work, he played football for Stoke St Peter's (a youth side that were linked with Stoke City). His performances attracted the attention of Tom Mather, Stoke City's manager. In August 1929, at the age of 19, he signed with Stoke City on amateur terms.

== Playing career ==
=== Stoke City ===
In May 1930, Sale signed a professional contract with Stoke City. On Christmas Day, of the same year, Sale made his senior début in a match against Bradford City. By the 1932–33 season, Sale had established himself as a prominent member of the team, helping Stoke win the Second Division with 11 goals in 21 appearances. In the following two seasons, Sale was the club's top scorer. He scored 17 times in the 1933–34 season, in which Stoke finished 12th in the First Division. In the subsequent season, 1934–35, Sale scored 21 goals, helping Stoke to a 10th-place finish in the First Division.

=== Blackburn Rovers ===
Bob McGrory, Mather's successor as Stoke manager, sold Tommy Sale to Blackburn Rovers in March 1936, for the sum of £6,000. This surprised supporters at the time, however McGory had confidence in Freddie Steele, who he had earmarked as a potential replacement for Sale. Sale spent two years at Blackburn before departing. Blackburn were relegated from the First Division in his first season at the club, 1935–36, finishing bottom of the table. He left the club halfway through the subsequent season, 1936–37, in which Blackburn finished 12th in the Second Division.

=== Second spell at Stoke City ===
Bob McGrory, Stoke's manager, re-signed Sale for Stoke in March 1938, initially as cover for Steele, who was injured at the time. Following his return, Sale scored five goals in three games, as he set about regaining his place in the team. He re-established his place in the side, as he scored 18 further goals in the remainder of the 1938–39 season. The 1939–40 season was suspended due to the outbreak of World War II, however Sale continued his goalscoring exploits with 56 goals (in all competitions) in 1941–42 and then 64 goals over the course of two seasons: 1943–44 and 1944–45. In the latter of these two seasons, Sale netted six times in an 8–0 win over Walsall. Despite most of his goals coming from open play, Sale was a penalty specialist; it is reported Sale only missed one penalty in his entire professional career. Sale's last appearance for Stoke came on 8 April 1946, at the age of 35, in a War League game against Sheffield United at Stoke's home ground, the Victoria Ground. Following his departure from Stoke, Sale had two spells at Northwich Victoria and Hednesford Town before announcing his retirement in 1949, at the age of 39.

== Career statistics ==
Appearances and goals by club, season and competition
Club	Season	League			FA Cup		Total	
Club	Season	Division	Apps	Goals	Apps	Goals	Apps	Goals
Stoke City	1930–31	Second Division	17	2	3	2	20	4
Stoke City	1931–32	Second Division	24	9	5	0	29	9
Stoke City	1932–33	Second Division	21	11	0	0	21	11
Stoke City	1933–34	First Division	32	15	4	2	36	17
Stoke City	1934–35	First Division	35	24	1	0	36	24
Stoke City	1935–36	First Division	32	14	5	1	37	15
Stoke City	Total		161	75	18	5	179	80
Blackburn Rovers	1935–36	First Division	8	4	0	0	8	4
Blackburn Rovers	1936–37	Second Division	37	14	2	0	39	14
Blackburn Rovers	1937–38	Second Division	20	7	1	1	21	8
Blackburn Rovers	Total		65	25	3	1	68	26
Stoke City	1937–38	First Division	8	5	0	0	8	5
Stoke City	1938–39	First Division	34	18	0	0	34	18
Stoke City	1945–46	–	–		1	0	1	0
Stoke City	Total		42	23	1	0	43	23
Stoke City	Stoke City total		203	98	19	5	222	103
Career total			268	123	22	6	290	129

== Honours ==
Stoke City

- Football League Second Division champions: 1932–33
