= Arthur Beachill =

English footballer (1905–1943)

Personal information
- Full name: Arthur Beachill
- Date of birth: 21 May 1905
- Place of birth: Monk Bretton, England
- Date of death: 12 April 1943 (aged 37)
- Place of death: Stoke-on-Trent, England
- Position: Full back

Senior career*
Years	Team	Apps	(Gls)
1924	Rotherham County	0	(0)
1925	Frickley Colliery		
1926–1933	Stoke City	128	(0)
1934–1935	Millwall	12	(0)
Total		140	(0)
- * Club domestic league appearances and goals

Arthur Beachill (21 May 1905 – 12 April 1943) was an English footballer who played in the Football League for Millwall and Stoke City.

== Career ==
Beachill was born in Monk Bretton and played football for his work side at the nearby mill. He signed for Rotherham County but failed to make an impact and played for Frickley Colliery. He was then given a chance with Stoke City and after three seasons in the reserves he forced his way into the first team and didn't miss a match in 1931–32. He then played 38 times in 1932–33 as Stoke won the Second Division title. He was often described as unhurried, fluent in both feet and one who was able to consistently play at his best.

After one season playing in the First Division with Stoke he was allowed to join London club, Millwall where he spent the 1934–35 season. Afterwards he returned to Stoke-on-Trent and decided to join the local foundry. He died of a heart attack walking home from work and the coroner put his death down to overstrain.

== Career statistics ==
Appearances and goals by club, season and competition
Club	Season	League			FA Cup		Other		Total	
Club	Season	Division	Apps	Goals	Apps	Goals	Apps	Goals	Apps	Goals
Stoke City	1926–27	Third Division North	1	0	0	0	—		1	0
Stoke City	1927–28	Second Division	0	0	0	0	—		0	0
Stoke City	1928–29	Second Division	4	0	0	0	—		4	0
Stoke City	1929–30	Second Division	20	0	1	0	—		21	0
Stoke City	1930–31	Second Division	5	0	0	0	—		5	0
Stoke City	1931–32	Second Division	42	0	5	0	—		47	0
Stoke City	1932–33	Second Division	36	0	2	0	—		38	0
Stoke City	1933–34	First Division	20	0	0	0	—		20	0
Stoke City	Total		128	0	8	0	—		136	0
Millwall	1934–35	Third Division South	12	0	1	0	2	0	15	0
Career Total			140	0	9	0	2	0	151	0

== Honours ==
with Stoke City

- Football League Second Division Champions: 1932–33
- Football League Third Division North Champions: 1926–27
