= John Alderson (footballer) =

English footballer (1910–11986)

Personal information
- Full name: John Henry Alderson
- Date of birth: 5 March 1910
- Place of birth: Bowburn, England
- Date of death: 1986 (aged 75–76)
- Height: 5 ft 8 in (1.73 m)
- Position: Outside left

Senior career*
Years	Team	Apps	(Gls)
1927–1928	Bowburn		
1928–1930	Bishop Auckland		
1930–1931	Stoke City	0	(0)
1931–1932	Bowburn		
1932–1933	Darlington	2	(1)
Total		2	(1)
- * Club domestic league appearances and goals

John Henry Alderson (5 March 1910 – 1986) was a footballer who played in the Football League for Darlington. He was born in England.

== Career statistics ==
Appearances and goals by club, season and competition
Club	Season	League			FA Cup		Total	
Club	Season	Division	Apps	Goals	Apps	Goals	Apps	Goals
Stoke City	1930–31	Second Division	0	0	0	0	0	0
Darlington	1932–33	Third Division North	2	1	0	0	2	1
Career total			2	1	0	0	2	1
