= 1933–34 Stoke City F.C. season =

Stoke City
1933–34 season
- Chairman: Mr A.McSherwin
- Manager: Tom Mather
- Stadium: Victoria Ground
- Football League First Division: 12th (41 points)
- FA Cup: Quarter-final
- Top goalscorer: League: Tommy Sale (15); All: Tommy Sale (17)
- Highest home attendance: 43,163 vs Arsenal (31 March 1934)
- Lowest home attendance: 10,198 vs Huddersfield Town (29 January 1934)
- Average home league attendance: 23,087
Home colours

The 1933–34 season was Stoke City's 34th season in the Football League and the 20th in the First Division.

Now back in the First Division for the first time since the 1922–23 season Stoke were looking to establish themselves amongst the nation's elite. However, they struggled and by Christmas they were in the relegation places, but only three defeats in their last twelve matches saw Stoke survive comfortably and finished the season in 12th place with 41 points.

In the FA Cup Stoke advanced to the quarter final and played Manchester City where the largest attendance at an English football match was recorded with 84,569 packed into Maine Road.

== Season review ==
=== League ===
After a decade out of the First Division, Stoke were back in the top-flight for the first time since 1922. The atmosphere around the club was first-class with the directors re-signing the entire first team squad for the 1933–34 season. Consolidation was the obvious aim, but playing in the First Division was a totally different challenge and the reality of taking on better sides soon hit home.

Stoke struggled and by Christmas they found themselves in the relegation zone and looked to be heading back to the Second Division. It was at this juncture that Tom Mather made two vital decisions, firstly he signed Arthur Tutin a right-half from Aldershot for £500 and then he recalled Bob McGrory from the reserves at the age of 40. McGrory's presence boosted the sides morale and Stoke climbed up the table, eventually finishing 12th place. During the second half of the season they picked up more points than any other team with the exception of the top two Arsenal and Huddersfield Town. Stanley Matthews, never regarded for his goal scoring scored 15 goals, his best tally of his famous career.

=== FA Cup ===
In the FA Cup Stoke advanced past Bradford Park Avenue, Blackpool and Chelsea before meeting Manchester City at Maine Road in the quarter Final. Man City won the tie 1–0 thanks to a goal from legendary striker Eric Brook. An attendance of 84,569 packed into Maine Road, the largest attendance at an English football match.

== Final league table ==
Pos	Team	Pld	W	D	L	GF	GA	GAv	Pts
10	Portsmouth	42	15	12	15	52	55	0.945	42
11	Sheffield Wednesday	42	16	9	17	62	67	0.925	41
12	Stoke City	42	15	11	16	58	71	0.817	41
13	Aston Villa	42	14	12	16	78	75	1.040	40
14	Everton	42	12	16	14	62	63	0.984	40

Source: World Football
Rules for classification: 1) Points; 2) Goal average; 3) Goals scored

== Results ==
Stoke's score comes first

=== Legend ===
Win	Draw	Loss

=== Football League First Division ===
Match	Date	Opponent	Venue	Result	Attendance	Scorers
1	26 August 1933	Chelsea	H	1–0	32,456	Liddle
2	30 August 1933	Liverpool	A	1–1	20,000	Sale
3	2 September 1933	Sunderland	A	1–4	25,000	Johnson
4	4 September 1933	Liverpool	H	1–1	28,868	Davies
5	9 September 1933	Portsmouth	H	2–1	29,292	Davies, Sale
6	16 September 1933	Huddersfield Town	A	2–2	12,000	Liddle, Palethorpe
7	23 September 1933	Derby County	H	0–4	32,273	
8	30 September 1933	Wolverhampton Wanderers	H	1–1	29,289	Davies
9	7 October 1933	Sheffield United	A	2–1	11,380	Palethorpe (2)
10	14 October 1933	Aston Villa	H	1–1	37,511	Turner (pen)
11	21 October 1933	West Bromwich Albion	A	1–5	22,771	Sale
12	28 October 1933	Birmingham	H	1–1	17,194	Liddle
13	4 November 1933	Middlesbrough	A	1–6	6,748	Davies
14	11 November 1933	Manchester City	H	0–1	24,083	
15	18 November 1933	Arsenal	A	0–3	40,000	
16	25 November 1933	Everton	H	1–2	19,838	Liddle
17	2 December 1933	Leeds United	A	0–2	20,000	
18	9 December 1933	Blackburn Rovers	H	2–0	13,618	Liddle, Sale
19	16 December 1933	Newcastle United	A	2–2	10,000	Sale (pen), McArdle
20	23 December 1933	Sheffield Wednesday	H	0–1	10,000	
21	25 December 1933	Leicester City	H	2–1	11,200	Sale, Bamber
22	26 December 1933	Leicester City	A	1–3	20,000	Matthews
23	30 December 1933	Chelsea	A	0–2	25,000	
24	6 January 1934	Sunderland	H	3–0	16,313	Sale, Sellars, Davies
25	20 January 1934	Portsmouth	A	1–3	20,000	Matthews
26	29 January 1934	Huddersfield Town	H	3–0	10,198	Matthews, Sale, Soo
27	3 February 1934	Derby County	A	1–5	21,200	Matthews
28	10 February 1934	Wolverhampton Wanderers	A	2–0	25,125	Sale, Johnson
29	22 February 1934	Sheffield United	H	3–0	14,997	Johnson, Matthews, Davies
30	24 February 1934	Aston Villa	A	2–1	25,000	Johnson (2)
31	8 March 1934	West Bromwich Albion	H	4–1	13,698	Sale (3), Matthews
32	10 March 1934	Birmingham	A	1–0	16,000	Sale
33	17 March 1934	Middlesbrough	H	2–0	17,129	Sale, Matthews
34	24 March 1934	Manchester City	A	2–4	13,900	Matthews, Johnson
35	30 March 1934	Tottenham Hotspur	A	0–0	20,000	
36	31 March 1934	Arsenal	H	1–1	43,163	Matthews
37	2 April 1934	Tottenham Hotspur	H	2–0	32,000	Johnson Ware
38	7 April 1934	Everton	A	2–2	25,000	Ware (2)
39	14 April 1934	Leeds United	H	1–2	16,262	Ware
40	21 April 1934	Blackburn Rovers	A	1–4	10,000	Johnson
41	28 April 1934	Newcastle United	H	2–1	12,225	Matthews, Sale
42	5 May 1934	Sheffield Wednesday	A	2–2	12,000	Matthews, Liddle

=== FA Cup ===
Round	Date	Opponent	Venue	Result	Attendance	Scorers
R3	13 January 1934	Bradford Park Avenue	H	3–0	22,306	Matthews, Sale, Soo
R4	27 January 1934	Blackpool	H	3–0	30,091	Matthews, Sale, Soo
R5	2 February 1934	Chelsea	H	3–1	42,213	Matthews (2), Johnson
Quarter final	3 March 1934	Manchester City	A	0–1	84,569	

== Squad statistics ==
Pos.	Name	League		FA Cup		Total	
Pos.	Name	Apps	Goals	Apps	Goals	Apps	Goals
GK	(England) Norman Lewis	12	0	1	0	13	0
GK	(Wales) Roy John	30	0	3	0	33	0
DF	(England) John Bamber	2	1	0	0	2	1
DF	(England) Arthur Beachill	20	0	0	0	20	0
DF	(England) Joe Buller	1	0	0	0	1	0
DF	(England) John Howshall	1	0	0	0	1	0
DF	(England) Charlie Scrimshaw	8	0	2	0	10	0
DF	(England) Billy Spencer	31	0	2	0	33	0
DF	(Scotland) Bob McGrory	26	0	4	0	30	0
MF	(England) Charlie Curtis	0	0	0	0	0	0
MF	(England) George Daniels	2	0	0	0	2	0
MF	(England) Peter Jackson	6	0	0	0	6	0
MF	(England) Peter McArdle	6	1	0	0	6	1
MF	(Scotland) William Robertson	11	0	0	0	11	0
MF	(England) Harry Sellars	38	1	4	0	42	1
MF	(England) Arthur Turner	40	1	4	0	44	1
MF	(England) Arthur Tutin	24	0	4	0	28	0
FW	(England) Harry Davies	32	6	3	0	35	6
FW	(England) Joe Johnson	36	8	4	1	40	9
FW	(England) Bobby Liddle	33	6	3	0	36	6
FW	(England) Stanley Matthews	29	11	4	4	33	15
FW	(England) Joe Mawson	2	0	0	0	2	0
FW	(England) Jack Palethorpe	11	3	0	0	11	3
FW	(England) Billy Robson	2	0	0	0	2	0
FW	(England) Tommy Sale	32	15	4	2	36	17
FW	(England) Frank Soo	14	1	2	2	16	3
FW	(England) Harry Ware	13	4	0	0	13	4
