= Jack Hodgson (footballer) =

English footballer

Personal information
- Full name: John Venner Hodgson
- Date of birth: 30 September 1913
- Place of birth: Seaham, England
- Date of death: 1970 (aged 56–57)
- Height: 6 ft 1 in (1.85 m)
- Position: Defender

Senior career*
Years	Team	Apps	(Gls)
- Seaham Colliery
1932–1947	Grimsby Town	215	(2)
1947–1951	Doncaster Rovers	95	(2)

Managerial career
- 1958: Doncaster Rovers (joint manager)
- * Club domestic league appearances and goals

John Venner Hodgson (30 September 1913 – 1970) was a footballer who played in the Football League for Doncaster Rovers and Grimsby Town.
