= 1931–32 Stoke City F.C. season =

Stoke City
1931–32 season
- Chairman: Mr A.McSherwin
- Manager: Tom Mather
- Stadium: Victoria Ground
- Football League Second Division: 3rd (52 Points)
- FA Cup: Fifth Round
- Top goalscorer: League: Joe Mawson (20); All: Joe Mawson (24)
- Highest home attendance: 28,192 vs Port Vale (26 September 1931)
- Lowest home attendance: 5,051 vs Oldham Athletic (28 April 1932)
- Average home league attendance: 12,278
Home colours

The 1931–32 season was Stoke City's 32nd season in the Football League and the 12th in the Second Division.

It was a good season for Stoke as they were finally able to mount a serious promotion challenge. They were involved in the race throughout the season and just missed out finishing third, two points behind second-placed Leeds United. Too many winnable matches were drawn with fourteen matches ending on level terms.

In March 1932 away at Bury, 17-year-old Stanley Matthews made his professional debut and he would go on to become one of the greatest players in English football.

== Season review ==
=== League ===
The 1931–32 season proved to be an entertaining season for Stoke as they were involved in the hunt for promotion throughout the campaign, just missing out in third spot in the final placings. Their draw tally of 14 cost Stoke dearly in the end and on a number of occasions Stoke were denied victory due to last minute equalisers from their opponents. There were a number of good things to come out of the season, including 25 goals from Joe Mawson and a 14 match unbeaten run from mid-November to the beginning of February. Manager Tom Mather was able to select the same starting eleven for 16 consecutive matches, a club record. Stoke, suffered the fewest defeats in the Second Division.

The directors, who had used cash resources carefully, allowed Mather to build up his squad, and he duly pulled off three excellent deals, the returning Harry Davies from Huddersfield Town, goalkeeper Roy John and winger Joe Johnson. Johnson was perhaps the shrewdest of the three, for Stoke became aware that his club Bristol City were struggling for money and after a goalless draw at Ashton Gate in April 1932 Stoke paid Bristol a mere £250 for his signature.

It was at Bury on 19 Match 1932 that Stoke introduced their latest local talent, Stanley Matthews who at the time was described at the time as a 'promising outside right'. Matthews had signed professional contract forms on his 17th birthday (1 February 1932) and was deputising for the injured Bobby Liddle.

=== FA Cup ===
Stoke, beat Hull City 3–0 and Sunderland 2–1 in a 2nd replay before been knocked out 3–0 by Bury.

== Final league table ==
Pos	Team	Pld	W	D	L	GF	GA	GAv	Pts	Promotion or relegation
1	Wolverhampton Wanderers (C, P)	42	24	8	10	115	49	2.347	56	Promotion to the First Division
2	Leeds United (P)	42	22	10	10	78	54	1.444	54	Promotion to the First Division
3	Stoke City	42	19	14	9	69	48	1.438	52	
4	Plymouth Argyle	42	20	9	13	100	66	1.515	49	
5	Bury	42	21	7	14	70	58	1.207	49	

Rules for classification: 1) Points; 2) Goal average; 3) Goals scored
(C) Champions; (P) Promoted

== Results ==
Stoke's score comes first

=== Legend ===
Win	Draw	Loss

=== Football League Second Division ===
Match	Date	Opponent	Venue	Result	Attendance	Scorers
1	29 August 1931	Chesterfield	H	2–1	12,130	Kirkham, McMahon
2	31 August 1931	Bradford Park Avenue	A	1–2	7,000	Taylor
3	5 September 1931	Burnley	A	0–3	8,710	
4	7 September 1931	Manchester United	H	3–0	10,518	Mawson (2), Liddle
5	12 September 1931	Preston North End	H	4–1	9,400	Mawson, Liddle, Sale, Archibald
6	16 September 1931	Manchester United	A	1–1	5,025	Liddle
7	19 September 1931	Southampton	A	2–1	10,063	Mawson (2)
8	26 September 1931	Port Vale	H	4–0	28,192	Sale, Bussey (3)
9	3 October 1931	Charlton Athletic	H	4–0	10,024	Sale, Liddle (2), Mawson
10	10 October 1931	Wolverhampton Wanderers	A	1–0	30,000	Liddle
11	17 October 1931	Millwall	A	0–1	8,000	
12	24 October 1931	Bradford City	H	3–1	10,000	Liddle, Sale (2) (1 pen)
13	31 October 1931	Leeds United	A	0–2	15,000	
14	7 November 1931	Bury	H	3–2	11,145	Liddle, Sale, Mawson
15	14 November 1931	Barnsley	A	0–1	6,000	
16	21 November 1931	Notts County	H	2–2	11,120	Bussey, Mawson
17	28 November 1931	Plymouth Argyle	A	1–1	7,000	Sale
18	5 December 1931	Bristol City	H	1–1	8,600	Mawson
19	12 December 1931	Oldham Athletic	A	3–1	5,748	Mawson (2), Sellars
20	19 December 1931	Swansea Town	H	0–0	7,200	
21	25 December 1931	Nottingham Forest	H	2–1	8,150	Sale (2) (1 pen)
22	26 December 1931	Nottingham Forest	A	1–1	12,000	Bussey
23	2 January 1932	Chesterfield	A	3–1	7,976	Mawson, Taylor (2)
24	16 January 1932	Burnley	H	3–0	9,045	Mawson, Taylor, Bussey
25	30 January 1932	Southampton	H	2–0	9,206	Taylor, Ware
26	6 February 1932	Port Vale	A	0–3	20,703	
27	15 February 1932	Charlton Athletic	A	1–1	10,000	Liddle
28	20 February 1932	Wolverhampton Wanderers	H	2–1	25,641	Bussey, Mawson
29	25 February 1932	Preston North End	A	0–2	3,074	
30	27 February 1932	Millwall	H	0–0	12,036	
31	5 March 1932	Bradford City	A	2–2	12,000	Taylor (2)
32	12 March 1932	Leeds United	H	3–4	8,500	Taylor, Mawson, Davies
33	19 March 1932	Bury	A	1–0	4,000	Maloney
34	25 March 1932	Tottenham Hotspur	A	3–3	12,500	Mawson (3)
35	26 March 1932	Barnsley	H	2–0	7,200	Liddle, Robertson
36	28 March 1932	Tottenham Hotspur	H	2–2	15,077	Liddle, Davies
37	2 April 1932	Notts County	A	1–2	10,886	Mawson
38	9 April 1932	Plymouth Argyle	H	3–2	7,000	Mawson, Davies (2)
39	16 April 1932	Bristol City	A	0–0	10,000	
40	23 April 1932	Oldham Athletic	H	1–1	5,051	Taylor
41	30 April 1932	Swansea Town	A	1–1	6,000	Bussey
42	7 May 1932	Bradford Park Avenue	H	1–0	5,892	Ware

=== FA Cup ===
Round	Date	Opponent	Venue	Result	Attendance	Scorers
R3	9 January 1932	Hull City	H	3–0	20,024	Sellars, Bussey, Mawson
R4	23 January 1932	Sunderland	A	1–1	43,700	Mawson
R4 Replay	28 January 1932	Sunderland	H	1–1 (aet)	30,575	Bussey
R4 2nd Replay	1 February 1932	Sunderland	N	2–1 (aet)	7,470	Mawson (2)
R5	13 February 1932	Bury	A	0–3	29,503	

== Squad statistics ==
Pos.	Name	League		FA Cup		Total	
Pos.	Name	Apps	Goals	Apps	Goals	Apps	Goals
GK	(Wales) Roy John	1	0	0	0	1	0
GK	(England) Norman Lewis	41	0	5	0	46	0
DF	(England) Arthur Beachill	42	0	5	0	47	0
DF	(England) Joe Buller	1	0	0	0	1	0
DF	(Scotland) Bob McGrory	41	0	5	0	46	0
DF	(England) Billy Spencer	1	0	0	0	1	0
MF	(England) Len Armitage	4	0	0	0	4	0
MF	(England) Peter Jackson	1	0	0	0	1	0
MF	John McDaid	3	0	0	0	3	0
MF	(Scotland) Hugh McMahon	8	1	0	0	8	1
MF	(England) Tim Maloney	8	1	0	0	8	1
MF	(Scotland) William Robertson	38	1	5	0	43	1
MF	(England) Arthur Turner	35	0	5	0	40	0
MF	(England) Harry Sellars	42	1	5	1	47	2
FW	(Scotland) Bobby Archibald	21	1	3	0	24	1
FW	(England) Walter Bussey	37	8	3	2	40	10
FW	(England) Harry Davies	14	4	0	0	14	4
FW	(England) Joe Johnson	1	0	0	0	1	0
FW	(England) Wilf Kirkham	1	1	0	0	1	1
FW	(England) Bobby Liddle	39	11	5	0	44	11
FW	(England) Stanley Matthews	2	0	0	0	2	0
FW	(England) Joe Mawson	34	20	5	4	39	24
FW	(England) Albert Pinxton	0	0	0	0	0	0
FW	(England) Tommy Sale	24	9	5	0	29	9
FW	(England) Harold Taylor	17	9	2	0	19	9
FW	(England) Harry Ware	6	2	2	0	8	2
