= Bob McGrory =

Scottish footballer (1891–1954)

Personal information
- Full name: Robert Gerald McGrory
- Date of birth: 17 October 1891
- Place of birth: Bishopton, Scotland
- Date of death: 24 May 1954 (aged 62)
- Place of death: Glasgow, Scotland
- Height: 6 ft 0 in (1.83 m)
- Position: Full-back

Senior career*
Years	Team	Apps	(Gls)
1914–1920	Dumbarton	212	(0)
1918	→ Partick Thistle (guest)	1	(0)
1920–1921	Burnley	3	(0)
1921–1935	Stoke City	479	(0)
Total		695	(0)

Managerial career
- 1935–1952: Stoke City
- 1953: Merthyr Tydfil
- * Club domestic league appearances and goals

Robert Gerald McGrory (17 October 1891 – 24 May 1954) was a Scottish footballer who played in the Football League for Burnley and Stoke City with whom he later had a long spell as manager.

McGrory played football with Dumbarton before joining English side Burnley in August 1920. After only making three appearances for the Clarets he signed for Stoke City in May 1921. He soon became an indispensable part of Tom Mather's first team and was made club captain, skippering the side to promotions in 1926–27 and 1932–33. He spent 15 seasons as a player for Stoke, racking up 511 appearances without scoring.

He took over as Stoke manager in 1935, and in his first season in charge guided the team to a highest finish of 4th. World War II disrupted what could have been a successful spell for Stoke, but in the first season after the war they made their first real attempt to win the First Division, but an ongoing dispute with star winger Stanley Matthews saw him leave for Blackpool just before the end of the season and Stoke went on to lose their must-win match against Sheffield United. McGrory remained in charge until 1952 when he ended his 31-year association with the club. He spent a short spell in charge of Merthyr Tydfil, leaving after one season due to ill health and dying a year later.

== Playing career ==
=== Early career ===
Born in Bishopton, Renfrewshire, McGrory began work as an apprentice joiner on a shipyard in Clydeside. In 1914 he signed for Dumbarton, despite only previously playing boys brigade football. He missed only a dozen of a possible 224 Scottish Football League fixtures (the top division continued to be contested officially during World War I) across his six seasons with the Sons – even squeezing in a single wartime guest appearance for Partick Thistle – and began at attract interest from south of the border, also coming into international consideration when selected for the Home Scots v Anglo-Scots trial match in March 1920 along with clubmate James Scott.

Burnley signed him in August 1920 for a fee of £3,500 but he failed to become a regular at Turf Moor, making three appearances in a season where the Clarets won the Football League championship. He joined Stoke on 23 April 1921, spotted by soon to be chairman Arthur Sherwin. Rumours has it that McGrory had reservations about joining Stoke as he did not like the look of the city. Whether this was true or not, he went on to spend 31 years living in Stoke-on-Trent.

=== Stoke City ===
Solidly built at 6 ft, McGrory was frequently described as 'stout-hearted' and played with 'an absence of flurry' no matter what the situation. He acquired the reputation as a fearless man-marker, and if 'dour' described McGrory's approach on the field, it aptly summed up the non-nonsense Scot's personality off it. After an early 7–1 aberration at Hull City, Stoke, with McGrory a major influence at the back, lost only two of their next 27 matches, with the defence conceding just six goals in 16 matches. The run allowed Stoke to claim second spot in 1921–22 to gain promotion to the First Division. McGrory proved to be one of the few Stoke players to cope with the top-flight as Stoke were relegated back to the Second Division. He took over from Alec Milne as club captain in 1925 a position he did not lose for ten years. Stoke suffered relegation again in 1925–26 but McGrory's drive helped Stoke win the Third Division North title in 1926–27.

Famously consistent he played 101 consecutive league games from March 1926 to September 1928. From 1930, the now 39-year-old McGrory began to coach the Stoke reserve team as well as playing for them, His replacement in the first team was his long-time full-back partner Billy Spencer, who deputised during the 1932–33 title winning season. By Christmas 1933, with McGrory-less Stoke floundering in the top flight Tom Mather recalled his 'old war-horse' to add his experience to a somewhat leaky defence, and it worked as in the second half of the season Stoke picked up more than any other teams bar champions Arsenal and runner-up Huddersfield Town, finishing in a respectable 12th position. Promoted to assistant manager in 1934, McGrory appeared in all 42 league matches in 1934–35 at the age of 41. His career at Stoke the took a dramatic turn as Mather left to become manager of Newcastle United and chairman Sherwin offered the job to McGrory who accepted. McGrory's club record of 511 appearances for Stoke would stand for 24 years.

== Managerial career ==
McGrory's managerial style was abrasive, contrasting starkly with that of his predecessor. Aware of the financial problems that had dogged the club in the past, McGrory implemented a policy of blooding young talent. He replaced himself with Charlie Scrimshaw while Frank Soo displaced Harry Sellars in midfield and the emerging Freddie Steele edged out Tommy Sale. It was brave management and it paid off as the young players developed into one of the most exciting teams in the country in the 1930s and in McGrory's first season in charge they finished a highest ever position of fourth with 47 points.

Stoke's most well known player at the time was Stanley Matthews who had become an England international and a very high-profile player however tensions soon surfaced between McGrory and Matthews. Under Mather, McGrory's roommate and best friend, Bobby Liddle lost his place in the side to Matthews and McGrory took every opportunity to avenge this injustice. In 1937 Matthews wanted the maximum signing-on fee of £650 rather than the normal £500. McGrory refused and as a result Stoke held him to his previous contract and Matthews was 21 days over the deadline before signing. Tensions between the pair simmered all through the season which came to a head in February 1938 when Matthews handed in a transfer request. Around 4,000 Stoke fans met with the directors at the King's Hall to see the board of directors come to the conclusion that Matthews must not leave. Matthews refused and reiterated his request to leave. Stoke rejected his request and Matthews wrote to the local paper thanking the fans for their support and he forged an uneasy truce with the management and board. Matthews pledged to do his best for his home town club and he did so until 1947 when he joined Blackpool.

He was manager of Stoke during World War II during which time Stoke found a number of impressive younger players. After the war and league football resumed Stoke had their first real attempt to win their first English league title in 1946–47. However, with Stoke challenging for the title McGrory's feud with Matthews resurfaced and he was allowed to join Blackpool for £11,500. Stoke then went into their final match of the season against Sheffield United knowing if they win they will be champions, they lost 2–1. McGrory tried in vain to re-establish Stoke as title contenders and after two consecutive relegation battles he left Stoke in May 1952 ending his 31-year stay at Stoke City.

In 1953 Merthyr Tydfil, an ambitious non-league side seeking election to the Football League, tempted McGrory out of retirement, although ill-health meant his tenure lasted just one season. He died in Glasgow on 24 May 1954.

== Career statistics ==
Appearances and goals by club, season and competition
Club	Season	League			FA Cup		Total	
Club	Season	Division	Apps	Goals	Apps	Goals	Apps	Goals
Burnley	1919–20	First Division	3	0	0	0	3	0
Stoke City	1920–21	Second Division	2	0	0	0	2	0
Stoke City	1921–22	Second Division	41	0	5	0	46	0
Stoke City	1922–23	First Division	32	0	2	0	34	0
Stoke City	1923–24	Second Division	29	0	1	0	30	0
Stoke City	1924–25	Second Division	40	0	1	0	41	0
Stoke City	1925–26	Second Division	36	0	2	0	38	0
Stoke City	1926–27	Third Division North	42	0	3	0	45	0
Stoke City	1927–28	Second Division	42	0	4	0	46	0
Stoke City	1928–29	Second Division	38	0	1	0	39	0
Stoke City	1929–30	Second Division	21	0	0	0	21	0
Stoke City	1930–31	Second Division	39	0	3	0	42	0
Stoke City	1931–32	Second Division	41	0	5	0	46	0
Stoke City	1932–33	Second Division	8	0	0	0	8	0
Stoke City	1933–34	First Division	26	0	4	0	30	0
Stoke City	1934–35	First Division	42	0	1	0	43	0
Stoke City	Total		479	0	32	0	511	0
Career total			482	0	32	0	514	0

== Managerial statistics ==
Managerial record by club and tenure
Team	From	To	Record				
Team	From	To	P	W	D	L	Win %
Stoke City	1 June 1935	31 May 1952	460	170	114	176	37.0
Total			460	170	114	176	37.0

== Honours ==
Stoke City

- Football League Third Division North: 1926–27
- Football League Second Division: 1932–33
