= 1935–36 in English football =

Football in England
- Season: 1935–36

Men's football
- Football League: Sunderland
- Football League Second Division: Manchester United
- FA Cup: Arsenal

The 1935–36 season was the 61st season of competitive football in England. Sunderland won the league, and in doing so they remain the last team to win the English League while wearing striped jerseys. They also equalled the record of six titles won by Aston Villa. It remains the most recent season that Sunderland would win the title.

Aston Villa and Blackburn Rovers were relegated from the First Division and therefore became the last two founder members of the Football League to lose top flight status for the first time.

== Diary of the season ==
- 16 November 1935: Table-toppers Sunderland beat Brentford 5–1, while George Camsell is among the goalscorers for Middlesbrough as they thrash Blackburn Rovers 6–1.
- 27 February 1936: The weekend fixture list is not announced until Thursday evening (for games involving teams a long distance apart) and Friday evening for all others in an attempt to thwart the football pools companies' ability to print their coupons as part of the Pools War.
- 9 March 1936: The Pools War ends and the League starts publishing the fixtures earlier in advance again.

== Honours ==
Competition	Winner	Runner-up
First Division	Sunderland (6*)	Derby County
Second Division	Manchester United	Charlton Athletic
Third Division North	Chesterfield	Chester City
Third Division South	Coventry City	Luton Town
FA Cup	Arsenal (2)	Sheffield United
Charity Shield	Sunderland	Arsenal
Home Championship	Scotland	England

Notes = Number in parentheses is the times that club has won that honour. * indicates new record for competition

== Football League ==
=== First Division ===
Pos	Team	Pld	W	D	L	GF	GA	GAv	Pts	Relegation
1	Sunderland (C)	42	25	6	11	109	74	1.473	56	
2	Derby County	42	18	12	12	61	52	1.173	48	
3	Huddersfield Town	42	18	12	12	59	56	1.054	48	
4	Stoke City	42	20	7	15	57	57	1.000	47	
5	Brentford	42	17	12	13	81	60	1.350	46	
6	Arsenal	42	15	15	12	78	48	1.625	45	
7	Preston North End	42	18	8	16	67	64	1.047	44	
8	Chelsea	42	15	13	14	65	72	0.903	43	
9	Manchester City	42	17	8	17	68	60	1.133	42	
10	Portsmouth	42	17	8	17	54	67	0.806	42	
11	Leeds United	42	15	11	16	66	64	1.031	41	
12	Birmingham	42	15	11	16	61	63	0.968	41	
13	Bolton Wanderers	42	14	13	15	67	76	0.882	41	
14	Middlesbrough	42	15	10	17	84	70	1.200	40	
15	Wolverhampton Wanderers	42	15	10	17	77	76	1.013	40	
16	Everton	42	13	13	16	89	89	1.000	39	
17	Grimsby Town	42	17	5	20	65	73	0.890	39	
18	West Bromwich Albion	42	16	6	20	89	88	1.011	38	
19	Liverpool	42	13	12	17	60	64	0.938	38	
20	Sheffield Wednesday	42	13	12	17	63	77	0.818	38	
21	Aston Villa (R)	42	13	9	20	81	110	0.736	35	Relegation to the Second Division
22	Blackburn Rovers (R)	42	12	9	21	55	96	0.573	33	Relegation to the Second Division

Source: World Football
Rules for classification: 1) Points; 2) Goal average; 3) Goals scored
(C) Champions; (R) Relegated

=== Second Division ===
Pos	Team	Pld	W	D	L	GF	GA	GAv	Pts	Promotion or relegation
1	Manchester United (C, P)	42	22	12	8	85	43	1.977	56	Promotion to the First Division
2	Charlton Athletic (P)	42	22	11	9	85	58	1.466	55	Promotion to the First Division
3	Sheffield United	42	20	12	10	79	50	1.580	52	
4	West Ham United	42	22	8	12	90	68	1.324	52	
5	Tottenham Hotspur	42	18	13	11	91	55	1.655	49	
6	Leicester City	42	19	10	13	79	57	1.386	48	
7	Plymouth Argyle	42	20	8	14	71	57	1.246	48	
8	Newcastle United	42	20	6	16	88	79	1.114	46	
9	Fulham	42	15	14	13	76	52	1.462	44	
10	Blackpool	42	18	7	17	93	72	1.292	43	
11	Norwich City	42	17	9	16	72	65	1.108	43	
12	Bradford City	42	15	13	14	55	65	0.846	43	
13	Swansea Town	42	15	9	18	67	76	0.882	39	
14	Bury	42	13	12	17	66	84	0.786	38	
15	Burnley	42	12	13	17	50	59	0.847	37	
16	Bradford (Park Avenue)	42	14	9	19	62	84	0.738	37	
17	Southampton	42	14	9	19	47	65	0.723	37	
18	Doncaster Rovers	42	14	9	19	51	71	0.718	37	
19	Nottingham Forest	42	12	11	19	69	76	0.908	35	
20	Barnsley	42	12	9	21	54	80	0.675	33	
21	Port Vale (R)	42	12	8	22	56	106	0.528	32	Relegation to the Third Division North
22	Hull City (R)	42	5	10	27	47	111	0.423	20	Relegation to the Third Division North

Rules for classification: 1) Points; 2) Goal average; 3) Goals scored
(C) Champions; (P) Promoted; (R) Relegated

=== Third Division North ===
Pos	Team	Pld	W	D	L	GF	GA	GAv	Pts	Promotion or relegation
1	Chesterfield (C, P)	42	24	12	6	92	39	2.359	60	Promotion to the Second Division
2	Chester	42	22	11	9	100	45	2.222	55	
3	Tranmere Rovers	42	22	11	9	93	58	1.603	55	
4	Lincoln City	42	22	9	11	91	51	1.784	53	
5	Stockport County	42	20	8	14	65	49	1.327	48	
6	Crewe Alexandra	42	19	9	14	80	76	1.053	47	
7	Oldham Athletic	42	18	9	15	86	73	1.178	45	
8	Hartlepools United	42	15	12	15	57	61	0.934	42	
9	Accrington Stanley	42	17	8	17	63	72	0.875	42	
10	Walsall	42	16	9	17	79	59	1.339	41	Transferred to the Third Division South
11	Rotherham United	42	16	9	17	69	66	1.045	41	
12	Darlington	42	17	6	19	74	79	0.937	40	
13	Carlisle United	42	14	12	16	56	62	0.903	40	
14	Gateshead	42	13	14	15	56	76	0.737	40	
15	Barrow	42	13	12	17	58	65	0.892	38	
16	York City	42	13	12	17	62	95	0.653	38	
17	Halifax Town	42	15	7	20	57	61	0.934	37	
18	Wrexham	42	15	7	20	66	75	0.880	37	
19	Mansfield Town	42	14	9	19	80	91	0.879	37	
20	Rochdale	42	10	13	19	58	88	0.659	33	
21	Southport	42	11	9	22	48	90	0.533	31	Re-elected
22	New Brighton	42	9	6	27	43	102	0.422	24	Re-elected

Source: rsssf.com
(C) Champions; (P) Promoted

=== Third Division South ===
Pos	Team	Pld	W	D	L	GF	GA	GAv	Pts	Promotion
1	Coventry City (C, P)	42	24	9	9	102	45	2.267	57	Promotion to the Second Division
2	Luton Town	42	22	12	8	81	45	1.800	56	
3	Reading	42	26	2	14	87	62	1.403	54	
4	Queens Park Rangers	42	22	9	11	84	53	1.585	53	
5	Watford	42	20	9	13	80	54	1.481	49	
6	Crystal Palace	42	22	5	15	96	74	1.297	49	
7	Brighton & Hove Albion	42	18	8	16	70	63	1.111	44	
8	Bournemouth & Boscombe Athletic	42	16	11	15	60	56	1.071	43	
9	Notts County	42	15	12	15	60	57	1.053	42	
10	Torquay United	42	16	9	17	62	62	1.000	41	
11	Aldershot	42	14	12	16	53	61	0.869	40	
12	Millwall	42	14	12	16	58	71	0.817	40	
13	Bristol City	42	15	10	17	48	59	0.814	40	
14	Clapton Orient	42	16	6	20	55	61	0.902	38	
15	Northampton Town	42	15	8	19	62	90	0.689	38	
16	Gillingham	42	14	9	19	66	77	0.857	37	
17	Bristol Rovers	42	14	9	19	69	95	0.726	37	
18	Southend United	42	13	10	19	61	62	0.984	36	
19	Swindon Town	42	14	8	20	64	73	0.877	36	
20	Cardiff City	42	13	10	19	60	73	0.822	36	
21	Newport County	42	11	9	22	60	111	0.541	31	Re-elected
22	Exeter City	42	8	11	23	59	93	0.634	27	Re-elected

(C) Champions; (P) Promoted

=== Top goalscorers ===
First Division

- W. G. Richardson (West Bromwich Albion) – 39 goals

Second Division

- Bobby Finan (Blackpool) – 34 goals

Third Division North

- Robert Bell (Tranmere Rovers) – 33 goals

Third Division South

- Albert Dawes (Crystal Palace) – 38 goals
