= Tom Williamson (Scottish footballer) =

Scottish footballer

Personal information
- Full name: Thomas Robertson Williamson
- Date of birth: 8 February 1901
- Place of birth: Dalmuir, Scotland
- Date of death: 1 April 1988 (aged 87)
- Place of death: Norwich, England
- Height: 5 ft 8 in (1.73 m)
- Position: Half-back

Senior career*
Years	Team	Apps	(Gls)
- Kirkintilloch Rob Roy
1922–1923	Blackburn Rovers	19	(1)
1923–1926	Third Lanark	85	(2)
1926–1930	Stoke City	152	(14)
1931–1933	Norwich City	82	(4)
Total		253	(19)
- * Club domestic league appearances and goals

Thomas Robertson Williamson (8 February 1901 – 1 April 1988) was a Scottish footballer who played in the Football League for Blackburn Rovers, Norwich City and Stoke.

== Career ==
Williamson was a Ship's plater working on the River Clyde before he started to play junior football for Kirkintilloch Rob Roy at weekends before signing for English First Division side Blackburn Rovers. Unfortunately, he never fitted in at Ewood Park and he returned to Scotland to sign for Third Lanark.

In 1926 Stoke City moved in and persuaded Williamson to sign for them in an attempt to gain an instant return to the Second Division. Williamson proved to be a shrewd signing by Tom Mather as he displayed his quality in his first season with Stoke winning the Football League Third Division North in 1926–27. He was almost ever-present in 1927–28 missing just two matches as Stoke had a good return to the second tier, finishing fifth. For the next two seasons Williamson forged a fine half back partnership with both Len Armitage and Harry Sellars and this trio were a vital part of Stoke's midfield towards the end of the 1920s.

In 1931 he left the Victoria Ground and joined Norfolk club Norwich City where he played for two seasons before retiring. He continued to live in Norwich until his death in 1988 at the age of 87.

== Career statistics ==
Appearances and goals by club, season and competition
Club	Season	League			FA Cup		Total	
Club	Season	Division	Apps	Goals	Apps	Goals	Apps	Goals
Blackburn Rovers	1922–23	First Division	4	0	0	0	4	0
Blackburn Rovers	1923–24	First Division	15	1	0	0	15	1
Blackburn Rovers	Total		19	1	0	0	19	1
Stoke City	1926–27	Third Division North	28	5	2	0	30	5
Stoke City	1927–28	Second Division	40	2	4	1	44	3
Stoke City	1928–29	Second Division	33	3	1	0	34	3
Stoke City	1929–30	Second Division	37	3	1	0	38	3
Stoke City	1930–31	Second Division	14	1	2	0	16	1
Stoke City	Total		152	14	10	1	162	15
Norwich City	1931–32	Third Division South	40	1	2	0	42	1
Norwich City	1932–33	Third Division South	41	1	1	0	42	1
Norwich City	1933–34	Third Division South	1	0	0	0	1	0
Norwich City	Total		82	4	3	0	85	4
Career total			253	19	13	1	266	20

== Honours ==
Stoke City

- Football League Third Division North Champions: 1926–27
