= Bobby Archibald =

Scottish footballer (1894–1966)

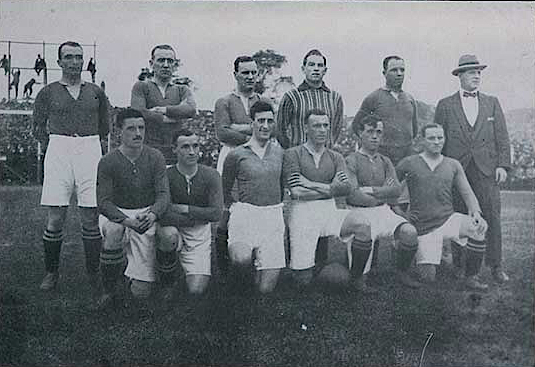
- Third Lanark team during 1923 tour – Archibald kneeling, second from left

Personal information
- Full name: Robert Fleming Archibald
- Date of birth: 6 November 1894
- Place of birth: Larkhall, Lanarkshire, Scotland
- Date of death: 27 November 1966 (aged 72)
- Place of death: Cambuslang, Lanarkshire, Scotland
- Position: Outside left

Senior career*
Years	Team	Apps	(Gls)
1912–1913	Albion Rovers	7	(5)
1912–1913	Hibernian	1	(1)
1913–1914	Third Lanark	2	(0)
1913–1914	→ Albion Rovers (loan)	17	(5)
1914–1920	Aberdeen	109	(16)
1916–1917	→ Rangers (loan)	12	(3)
1917–1918	→ Ayr United	1	(0)
1918–1919	→ Dumbarton (loan)	4	(0)
1920–1924	Raith Rovers	146	(10)
1924–1925	Third Lanark	38	(2)
1925–1931	Stoke City	262	(37)
1932–1933	Barnsley	6	(1)
Total		605	(80)
- * Club domestic league appearances and goals

Robert Fleming Archibald (6 November 1894 – 27 November 1966) was a footballer who played in the Football League for Barnsley and Stoke City.

Archibald played for a number of Scottish clubs before joining Stoke City in 1925. He helped Stoke win the Football League Third Division North in 1926–27 and became a consistent performer for Stoke at outside-left. He racked up 276 appearances for Stoke in seven seasons and he scored 40 goals. He ended his career with Barnsley and later became an insurance agent in Glasgow and a scout for Bradford City.

== Early life and family ==
Archibald was born in Larkhall, the son of John Archibald, a baker, and Elizabeth (née Hamilton). His younger brother Jock was also a footballer.

== Career ==
Archibald played for Rutherglen Glencairn, Albion Rovers, Third Lanark before joining Aberdeen in 1914. During World War I he played for Rangers and his army regiment in France and Denmark. On 25 August 1925 at the age of 29 he joined English side Stoke City and made a fine impression scoring on his debut against Stockport County on the opening day of the 1925–26, but a new look Stoke side failed to gel together and the side agonisingly slipped towards relegation to the Third Division. Archibald was a small player at just 5 ft 4in tall and weighing just 10 stone, His physique enabled him to become a fast player and his skill on the wings marked him out as one of the few class acts in the side relegated from the Second Division for the first time. He was renowned for his consistency, from his debut he played 58 consecutive matches before pulling a muscle against Rochdale in November 1927 and missed just six matches in the next six seasons.

His fine footwork proved to be too much for Third Division full backs as he set up numerous chances for Charlie Wilson to score his 25 goals as Stoke won the Football League Third Division North title. After six years of fine service he was awarded a benefit match, he chose the final home match of the 1930–31 season against West Bromwich Albion. The second highest crowd of the season, 26,064 paid £1,540 6s 2d to bid farewell to Archibald. He spent one more season at the Victoria Ground during which the now 38-year-old lost his place to Harold Taylor. Once manager Tom Mather had brought in Joe Johnson in April 1932 he allowed Archibald to join Barnsley. He played just eight matches for the "Tykes" and after spending several seasons in the reserves he retired in May 1937 at the age of 42.

== Personal life ==
At the end of his career he returned to his native Glasgow where he became an insurance agent and scouted from time to time for Bradford City manager Fred Westgarth.

Archibald always required the latest gadget; he would constantly use his wireless set in the dressing room for hours and was one of the few Stoke players to own his own car.

Archibald died at his home in Cambuslang of lung cancer in 1966, age 72.

== Career statistics ==
Appearances and goals by club, season and competition
Club	Season	League			FA Cup		Total	
Club	Season	Division	Apps	Goals	Apps	Goals	Apps	Goals
Hibernian	1912–13	Scottish Division One	1	1	0	0	1	1
Aberdeen	1914–15	Scottish Division One	31	3	0	0	31	3
Aberdeen	1915–16	Scottish Division One	38	7	0	0	38	7
Aberdeen	1919–20	Scottish Division One	40	6	4	0	44	6
Aberdeen	Total		109	16	4	0	113	16
Rangers (loan)	1916–17	Scottish Division One	12	3	0	0	12	3
Stoke City	1925–26	Second Division	42	10	2	0	44	10
Stoke City	1926–27	Third Division North	37	6	0	0	37	6
Stoke City	1927–28	Second Division	41	6	4	2	45	8
Stoke City	1928–29	Second Division	41	7	1	0	42	7
Stoke City	1929–30	Second Division	40	4	1	0	41	4
Stoke City	1930–31	Second Division	40	3	3	1	43	4
Stoke City	1931–32	Second Division	21	1	3	0	24	1
Stoke City	Total		262	37	14	3	276	40
Barnsley	1932–33	Third Division North	6	1	2	0	8	1
Career Total			413	57	16	3	430	61

== Honours ==
Stoke City

- Football League Third Division North Champions: 1926–27
