= Tommy Dawson (footballer, born 1901) =

English footballer

Personal information
- Full name: Thomas Dawson
- Date of birth: 15 December 1901
- Place of birth: Durham, England
- Date of death: 30 November 1977 (aged 75)
- Position: Defender

Senior career*
Years	Team	Apps	(Gls)
1921–1922	Washington Colliery		
1922–1923	Darlington	0	(0)
1923–1924	Chopwell Institute		
1924–1932	Stoke City	23	(0)
1932–1933	Clapton Orient	19	(0)
1933–1935	Gateshead	20	(0)
Total		62	(0)
- * Club domestic league appearances and goals

Thomas Dawson (15 December 1901 – 30 November 1977) was an English footballer who played in the Football League for Clapton Orient, Gateshead and Stoke City.

== Career ==
Dawson was born in Durham and worked as a miner, playing football for Washington Colliery and Chopwell Institute before joining Stoke City in 1924. He was used as back up to Bob McGrory and due to his consistency Dawson found it very difficult to break into the first team. He was then installed as captain of Stoke's reserve side and spent eight seasons at the Victoria Ground, making just 24 appearances in the first team. He played a season with Clapton Orient and then back in his home of the north east with Gateshead.

== Career statistics ==
Appearances and goals by club, season and competition
Club	Season	League			FA Cup		Total	
Club	Season	Division	Apps	Goals	Apps	Goals	Apps	Goals
Stoke City	1924–25	Second Division	5	0	0	0	5	0
Stoke City	1925–26	Second Division	8	0	0	0	8	0
Stoke City	1926–27	Third Division North	5	0	1	0	6	0
Stoke City	1927–28	Second Division	0	0	0	0	0	0
Stoke City	1928–29	Second Division	2	0	0	0	2	0
Stoke City	1929–30	Second Division	3	0	0	0	3	0
Stoke City	1930–31	Second Division	0	0	0	0	0	0
Stoke City	1931–32	Second Division	0	0	0	0	0	0
Stoke City	Total		23	0	1	0	24	0
Clapton Orient	1932–33	Third Division South	19	0	1	0	20	0
Gateshead	1933–34	Third Division North	18	0	2	0	20	0
Gateshead	1934–35	Third Division North	0	0	0	0	0	0
Gateshead	1935–36	Third Division North	2	0	0	0	2	0
Gateshead	Total		20	0	2	0	22	0
Career total			62	0	4	0	66	0

== Honours ==
Stoke City

- Football League Third Division North Champions: 1926–27
