= Harry Davies (footballer, born 1904) =

English footballer

Personal information
- Full name: Harold Augustus Davies
- Date of birth: 29 January 1904
- Place of birth: Gainsborough, England
- Date of death: 23 April 1975 (aged 71)
- Place of death: Blurton, Stoke-on-Trent, England
- Height: 5 ft 7 1/2 in (1.71 m)
- Position: Inside forward

Senior career*
Years	Team	Apps	(Gls)
- Bamfords Athletic
1922–1929	Stoke City	225	(68)
1929–1932	Huddersfield Town	55	(17)
1932–1938	Stoke City	164	(24)
1938–1939	Port Vale	44	(4)
Total		488	(113)
- * Club domestic league appearances and goals

Harold Augustus Davies MM (29 January 1904 – 23 April 1975) was an English footballer who played in the Football League for Huddersfield Town, Port Vale and most notably, Stoke City. A creative inside-forward, he played 513 games in the league and FA Cup, scoring 122 goals. His father, also called Harry, was also a professional footballer.

He spent seven seasons with Stoke from 1922 to 1929, helping the club to the Third Division North title in 1926–27. He then spent two seasons with Huddersfield Town, and featured in the 1930 FA Cup final defeat to Arsenal. He made a return to Stoke in February 1932 and spent another six seasons at the Victoria Ground, helping the club to the Second Division title in 1932–33. Having scored 101 goals in 411 matches for the "Potters" in his two spells, he was traded to Port Vale in February 1938. He retired in April 1939 and later fought in World War II.

== Playing career ==
Davies was born in Gainsborough and attended Queen Elizabeth's High School. His father was a professional footballer who played for Doncaster Rovers, Gainsborough Trinity, Hull City and Wolverhampton Wanderers. The family moved to Staffordshire after Harry Senior retired, and Harry Junior followed his father into playing football. He was spotted by Stoke City playing for Bamfords Athletic in the Uttoxeter amateur league. He was quickly thrust into first-team action with Stoke struggling to stay afloat in the First Division. He scored in his second appearance against West Bromwich Albion to earn Stoke their first win of the 1922–23 season, but it failed to avert the slide and ended with Stoke being relegated after finishing four points from safety. He became a key player in the 1923–24 season in a side which challenged for a return to the top flight, finishing as second-highest scorer to Jimmy Broad. A poor run form towards the end of the season saw Stoke miss out promotion and instead to finish a disappointing sixth place. Although a first-choice player in 1924–25, Davies was hampered by injuries, and an unsettled and inexperienced Stoke side only avoided relegation by a single point. Stoke failed to learn in 1925–26 and were relegated to the Third Division North. Stoke bounced back quickly in 1926–27 and won the divisional title relatively easily, with Davies scoring a career-best of 17 goals. He played regularly in the side for the next two seasons before he joined Huddersfield Town in 1929. He played for the "Professionals" in the 1929 FA Charity Shield.

The "Terriers" were looking to recapture their form under manager Herbert Chapman, which saw them dominate English football in the early 1920s and saw Davies as a replacement for England international Clem Stephenson who had become manager. In his first season with Town, Davies top scored with 10 goals and played in the 1930 FA Cup final as Huddersfield lost 2–0 to Arsenal. Following that set-back he fell out of favour at Leeds Road and Stoke manager Tom Mather wasted no time in bringing him back to the Victoria Ground in February 1932. Davies' return was met with approval by the club's supporters and was key in helping Stoke to win Second Division title in 1932–33. He linked up well with Stanley Matthews and when Bob McGrory stepped into managing the reserves, Davies was handed the captaincy. Back in the First Division, Davies was a key member of an exciting Stoke attack, and he became only the second player to pass 100 goals after Charlie Wilson.

With Davies' career coming to an end, he joined local rivals Port Vale – along with a small fee, for Tommy Ward in February 1938. He played 15 Third Division North games at the end of the 1937–38 season, claiming two goals. He scored twice in 29 league games in the 1938–39 campaign, as the "Valiants" switch into the Third Division South meant that he had scored a goal in all four divisions of the Football League. Davies retired in April 1939.

== Style of play ==
"Harry possessed a lot of ability and in addition to his goal contribution was very much a creative player whose incisive passing opened up many a defence. He was, in short, a bit of a class act."

— Stanley Matthews describing Davies in his autobiography.

== After football ==
Davies retired from playing just before World War II and he earned a Military Medal while serving with the Royal Army Service Corps. After the war he became owner of the Priory hotel in Abbey Hulton and then the Plume of Feathers in Barlaston. He also became a very good snooker player and competed in regional tournaments.

== Media career ==
Davies was one of the first players to write a newspaper column. He was paid sixpence a word, which at 200 words a column gave him a total of £5 a week, equalling his footballing wage.

== Career statistics ==
Appearances and goals by club, season and competition
Club	Season	League			FA Cup		Other		Total	
Club	Season	Division	Apps	Goals	Apps	Goals	Apps	Goals	Apps	Goals
Stoke City	1922–23	First Division	24	5	0	0	—		24	5
Stoke City	1923–24	Second Division	31	9	1	0	—		32	9
Stoke City	1924–25	Second Division	26	8	0	0	—		26	8
Stoke City	1925–26	Second Division	30	10	2	3	—		32	13
Stoke City	1926–27	Third Division North	39	15	3	2	—		42	17
Stoke City	1927–28	Second Division	40	11	4	2	—		44	13
Stoke City	1928–29	Second Division	35	10	1	0	—		36	10
Stoke City	Total		225	68	11	7	—		236	75
Huddersfield Town	1929–30	First Division	30	10	2	0	—		32	10
Huddersfield Town	1930–31	First Division	24	7	0	0	—		24	7
Huddersfield Town	1931–32	First Division	1	0	0	0	—		1	0
Huddersfield Town	Total		55	17	2	0	—		57	17
Stoke City	1931–32	Second Division	14	4	0	0	—		14	4
Stoke City	1932–33	Second Division	31	4	2	1	—		33	5
Stoke City	1933–34	First Division	32	6	3	0	—		35	6
Stoke City	1934–35	First Division	35	5	1	0	—		36	5
Stoke City	1935–36	First Division	29	4	5	1	—		34	5
Stoke City	1936–37	First Division	23	1	0	0	—		23	1
Stoke City	Total		164	24	11	2	—		175	26
Port Vale	1937–38	Third Division North	15	2	0	0	0	0	15	2
Port Vale	1938–39	Third Division South	29	2	1	0	4 (Note: Appearances in Third Division South Cup)	1	34	3
Port Vale	Total		44	4	1	0	4	1	49	5
Career total			488	113	25	9	4	1	517	123

== Honours ==
Stoke City

- Football League Third Division North: 1926–27
- Football League Second Division: 1932–33

Huddersfield Town

- FA Cup runner-up: 1929–30
