= Bob Dixon (footballer) =

English footballer

Personal information
- Full name: Robert Hewitson Dixon
- Date of birth: 30 August 1904
- Place of birth: Whitehaven, England
- Date of death: 1980 (aged 76)
- Place of death: Turkey
- Height: 5 ft 10 in (1.78 m)
- Position: Goalkeeper

Senior career*
Years	Team	Apps	(Gls)
- West Stanley
1922–1928	Stoke City	189	(0)
1928–1932	West Ham United	65	(0)
Total		254	(0)
- * Club domestic league appearances and goals

Robert Hewitson Dixon (30 August 1904 – 1980) was an English footballer who played in the Football League for West Ham United and Stoke City.

== Career ==
Dixon was born in Whitehaven and played for West Stanley before he was spotted by Stoke City's north-eastern scouts who had previously signed another 'keeper Richard Herron from West Stanley. He made his debut in a 5–1 victory at Blackburn Rovers but he was at fault for Rovers' goal and was 'not at ease'. That nervy display convinced the management that he needed a spell in the reserves, and was replaced by Gilbert Brookes and played just one more match in 1922–23. Early in the 1923–24 season Dixon won his place back this time from Scottish international Ken Campbell. New manager Tom Mather installed Dixon as his first choice and he went on to conceded just three goals in three months and banish memories of his awkward debut. Rarely seen without his cloth cap, Dixon's courage during the relegation battle of 1924–25 dug his errant defenders out of the mire on numerous occasions and was not afraid to throw himself at oncoming forwards feet often leading to personal injury. Following errors in a 3–0 home defeat by Wolverhampton Wanderers in March 1925, Dixon was dropped.

By the time he regained his place in the side the following season, Stoke were deep in the relegation places. The jittery defence struggled to cope with the new offside law and Dixon twice conceded seven goals and City were relegated. However Dixon missed just one match in 1926–27 as Stoke won the Third Division North title. In 1927–28 Dixon again missed just one match as Stoke finished in 5th position. In March 1929 he signed for West Ham United where he played second fiddle to Ted Hufton. He left the "Hammers" in the summer of 1933 and returned to Stoke-on-Trent to become a pub landlord he also ran a caravan park in Lytham St Anne's. He and his wife Daisy then emigrated to Turkey where they spent the rest of their lives.

== Career statistics ==
Appearances and goals by club, season and competition
Club	Season	League			FA Cup		Total	
Club	Season	Division	Apps	Goals	Apps	Goals	Apps	Goals
Stoke City	1922–23	First Division	2	0	0	0	2	0
Stoke City	1923–24	Second Division	31	0	1	0	32	0
Stoke City	1924–25	Second Division	33	0	1	0	34	0
Stoke City	1925–26	Second Division	34	0	2	0	36	0
Stoke City	1926–27	Third Division North	41	0	3	0	44	0
Stoke City	1927–28	Second Division	41	0	4	0	45	0
Stoke City	1928–29	Second Division	7	0	0	0	7	0
Stoke City	Total		189	0	11	0	200	0
West Ham United	1928–29	First Division	2	0	0	0	2	0
West Ham United	1929–30	First Division	12	0	0	0	12	0
West Ham United	1930–31	First Division	28	0	1	0	29	0
West Ham United	1931–32	First Division	20	0	2	0	22	0
West Ham United	1932–33	Second Division	3	0	0	0	3	0
West Ham United	Total		65	0	3	0	68	0
Career total			254	0	14	0	268	0

== Honours ==
Stoke City

- Football League Third Division North champions: 1926–27
