= Thomas Godfrey (footballer) =

Scottish footballer

Personal information
- Full name: Thomas Godfrey
- Date of birth: 15 January 1904
- Place of birth: Stenhousemuir, Scotland
- Date of death: 1983 (aged 79)
- Position: Defender

Senior career*
Years	Team	Apps	(Gls)
1926–1927	Stenhousemuir		
1927–1929	Stoke City	9	(0)
1930–1931	Walsall	38	(2)
1931–1932	Swindon Town	49	(0)
1933	Folkestone		
1934	Worcester City		
Total		96	(2)
- * Club domestic league appearances and goals

Thomas Godfrey (15 January 1904 – 1983) was a Scottish footballer who played in the Football League for Stoke City, Swindon Town and Walsall.

== Career ==
Godfrey began his career with his local club Stenhousemuir before joining English club Stoke City in 1927. He was frequently used as a backup player by Tom Mather during this three years at the Victoria Ground making 10 appearances. He then spent the 1930–31 with Walsall playing 42 times scoring twice. Two poor seasons with Swindon Town followed as the "Robins" failed to make much of an impression in the Third Division South and Godfrey went on to play non-league football with Folkestone and Worcester City.

== Career statistics ==
Club	Season	League			FA Cup		Total	
Club	Season	Division	Apps	Goals	Apps	Goals	Apps	Goals
Stoke City	1927–28	Second Division	6	0	1	0	7	0
Stoke City	1928–29	Second Division	2	0	0	0	2	0
Stoke City	1929–30	Second Division	1	0	0	0	1	0
Walsall	1930–31	Third Division South	38	2	4	0	42	2
Swindon Town	1931–32	Third Division South	41	0	1	0	42	0
Swindon Town	1932–33	Third Division South	8	0	0	0	8	0
Career Total			96	2	6	0	102	2
