= Harry Watson (footballer, born 1908) =

English footballer

Personal information
- Full name: Harold Watson
- Date of birth: 13 March 1908
- Place of birth: Wath-upon-Dearne, England
- Date of death: 1982 (aged 73–74)
- Position: Defender

Senior career*
| Years | Team | Apps | (Gls) |
| 1925–1926 | Wath Athletic | | |
| 1926–1930 | Stoke City | 4 | (0) |
| 1931–1933 | Brighton & Hove Albion | 6 | (0) |
| 1933 | Kidderminster Harriers | | |
- * Club domestic league appearances and goals

Harold Watson (13 March 1908 – 1982) was an English footballer who played in the Football League for Brighton & Hove Albion and Stoke City.

== Career ==
Watson played for his local club Wath Athletic before joining Stoke City in 1926. during his time at Stoke he was used mainly in the reserves and managed just four appearances in the Football League. He left in 1930 and joined Brighton & Hove Albion and then Kidderminster Harriers.

== Career statistics ==
Appearances and goals by club, season and competition
| Club | Season | League | | | FA Cup | | Total | |
| Club | Season | Division | Apps | Goals | Apps | Goals | Apps | Goals |
|---|---|---|---|---|---|---|---|---|
| Stoke City | 1926–27 | Third Division North | 0 | 0 | 1 | 0 | 1 | 0 |
| Stoke City | 1927–28 | Second Division | 2 | 0 | 0 | 0 | 2 | 0 |
| Stoke City | 1928–29 | Second Division | 0 | 0 | 0 | 0 | 0 | 0 |
| Stoke City | 1929–30 | Second Division | 2 | 0 | 0 | 0 | 2 | 0 |
| Stoke City | 1930–31 | Second Division | 0 | 0 | 0 | 0 | 0 | 0 |
| Brighton & Hove Albion | 1931–32 | Third Division South | 2 | 0 | 0 | 0 | 2 | 0 |
| Brighton & Hove Albion | 1932–33 | Third Division South | 4 | 0 | 0 | 0 | 4 | 0 |
| Career total | | | 10 | 0 | 1 | 0 | 11 | 0 |
