= Jack Eyres =

English footballer

Personal information
- Full name: John Eyres
- Date of birth: 20 March 1899
- Place of birth: Lostock Gralam, England
- Date of death: 2 October 1975 (aged 76)
- Place of death: Gainsborough, England
- Height: 5 ft 7 1/2 in (1.71 m)
- Position: Inside forward

Senior career*
| Years | Team | Apps | (Gls) |
| 1920–1921 | Nantwich Town | | |
| 1921–1922 | Witton Albion | | |
| 1922–1928 | Stoke City | 64 | (23) |
| 1929–1930 | Walsall | 81 | (34) |
| 1931 | Brighton & Hove Albion | 11 | (3) |
| 1932–1934 | Bristol Rovers | 64 | (12) |
| 1934–1935 | York City | 37 | (13) |
| 1935 | Gainsborough Trinity | | |
| Total | | 257 | (85) |
- * Club domestic league appearances and goals

John Eyres (20 March 1899 – 2 October 1975) was an English footballer who played in the Football League for Bristol Rovers, Brighton & Hove Albion, Walsall, York City and Stoke City.

== Career ==
Eyres was associated with Stoke for a period of seven years without really establishing himself in the first team. He had spells with Nantwich Town and Witton Albion before joining Stoke in 1922. His best season in red and white came in 1926–27 which saw Eyres score 12 goals helping Stoke win the Football League Third Division North title. After scoring on average a goal every three games for the "Potters" he was transferred to Walsall in 1929 for a small fee. He did well for the "Saddlers" scoring 37 goals in 89 matches in two seasons. He then spent a season at Brighton & Hove Albion, two at Bristol Rovers and ended his career with York City and non-league Gainsborough Trinity.

== Career statistics ==
Appearances and goals by club, season and competition
| Club | Season | League | | | FA Cup | | Total | |
| Club | Season | Division | Apps | Goals | Apps | Goals | Apps | Goals |
|---|---|---|---|---|---|---|---|---|
| Stoke City | 1922–23 | First Division | 4 | 1 | 0 | 0 | 4 | 1 |
| Stoke City | 1923–24 | Second Division | 19 | 7 | 0 | 0 | 19 | 7 |
| Stoke City | 1924–25 | Second Division | 14 | 2 | 0 | 0 | 14 | 2 |
| Stoke City | 1925–26 | Second Division | 3 | 0 | 0 | 0 | 3 | 0 |
| Stoke City | 1926–27 | Third Division North | 17 | 12 | 1 | 0 | 18 | 12 |
| Stoke City | 1927–28 | Second Division | 6 | 1 | 0 | 0 | 6 | 1 |
| Stoke City | 1928–29 | Second Division | 1 | 0 | 0 | 0 | 1 | 0 |
| Stoke City | Total | | 64 | 23 | 1 | 0 | 65 | 23 |
| Walsall | 1929–30 | Third Division South | 42 | 18 | 4 | 1 | 46 | 19 |
| Walsall | 1930–31 | Third Division South | 39 | 16 | 4 | 2 | 43 | 18 |
| Walsall | Total | | 81 | 34 | 8 | 3 | 89 | 37 |
| Brighton & Hove Albion | 1931–32 | Third Division South | 11 | 3 | 0 | 0 | 11 | 3 |
| Bristol Rovers | 1932–33 | Third Division South | 36 | 7 | 5 | 2 | 41 | 9 |
| Bristol Rovers | 1933–34 | Third Division South | 28 | 5 | 2 | 0 | 30 | 5 |
| Bristol Rovers | Total | | 64 | 12 | 6 | 2 | 70 | 14 |
| York City | 1934–35 | Third Division North | 37 | 13 | 3 | 0 | 40 | 13 |
| Career total | | | 257 | 85 | 19 | 5 | 279 | 90 |

== Honours ==
Stoke City

- Football League Third Division North: 1926–27
