= List of Wigan Borough F.C. seasons =

Wigan Borough F.C. was an English football club based in the town of Wigan. The club was founded in 1920 and joined the Lancashire Combination. In 1921, Borough turned professional when their application was accepted to play in the inaugural season of the newly formed Football League Third Division North.

== Seasons ==
Season	League									FA Cup	Top goalscorer	
Season	Division	P	W	D	L	F	A	Pts	Pos	FA Cup	Name	Goals
1920–21	LAN C-1	34	6	8	20	41	79	20	17th			
1921–22	Div 3 (N)	38	11	9	18	46	72	31	17th		Bert Freeman	13
1922–23	Div 3 (N)	38	18	8	12	64	39	44	5th	R2	Harry Dennison	13
1923–24	Div 3 (N)	42	14	14	14	55	53	42	10th	QR6	Len Armitage	21
1924–25	Div 3 (N)	42	15	11	16	62	65	41	11th	QR5	Billy Glover	15
1925–26	Div 3 (N)	42	13	11	18	68	74	37	17th	R3	Billy Dickinson	19
1926–27	Div 3 (N)	42	11	10	21	66	83	32	18th	R2	Billy Dickinson	26
1927–28	Div 3 (N)	42	10	10	22	56	97	30	20th	R1	Billy Dickinson	16
1928–29	Div 3 (N)	42	21	9	12	82	49	51	4th	R3	Wilfred Lievesley; Cecil Smith	13
1929–30	Div 3 (N)	42	13	7	22	60	88	33	18th	R1	Bobby Hughes; Cecil Smith; Billy Welsh	9
1930–31	Div 3 (N)	42	19	5	18	76	86	43	10th	R1	Jimmy Jepson	28
