= 1927–28 Stoke City F.C. season =

Stoke City
1927–28 season
- Chairman: Mr A.J. Sherwin
- Manager: Tom Mather
- Stadium: Victoria Ground
- Football League Second Division: 5th (52 points)
- FA Cup: Quarter-final
- Top goalscorer: League: Charlie Wilson (32); All: Charlie Wilson (38)
- Highest home attendance: 27,453 vs Manchester City (7 April 1928)
- Lowest home attendance: 8,251 vs Southampton (31 December 1927)
- Average home league attendance: 14,395
Home colours

The 1927–28 season was Stoke City's 28th season in the Football League and the eighth in the Second Division.

Record season ticket sales were recorded prior to the start of the 1927–28 season as supporters were buoyed following last season's Third Division North title win. Stoke had a good return to the Second Division, finishing 5th in the table, five points from promotion, and also reached the quarter final of the FA Cup losing to Arsenal. Charlie Wilson top-scored this season with a club-record 38 goals.

== Season review ==
=== League ===
The 1927–28 season saw Stoke back within one Division of the top flight, although a heavy bank overdraft of £13,000 meant that they couldn't go out and bolster the squad, Mather being forced to rely on the players who had served him well last season. However, chairman Sherwin assured the fans that he would spend the money if weakness became apparent but he stated that he would not be able to join in the transfer fee spiral that was gathering pace elsewhere. On a brighter note Stoke reported record season ticket sales for the new campaign.

Stoke made a fantastic start back in the Second Division beating Southampton 6–3 in the first match, this was followed up with 4–2 and 3–0 victories as Stoke started the season in fine form. Performances did eventually drop off and the team hit an inconsistent spell just before Christmas but then won six matches back to back. Stoke enjoyed a successful end to the campaign finishing in 5th position. Stoke's cup run perhaps cost them a genuine promotion challenge but nevertheless it was a good season with the club's bank balance improving and the team showing great consistency with six players playing 40 or more League games. The reserves also had a fine season, winning the Central League title for the first time.

=== FA Cup ===
After a number of pretty terrible performances in the FA Cup in the past few seasons, the 1927–28 season saw a marked improvement as Stoke beat Gillingham 6–1, Bolton Wanderers 4–2, Manchester City 1–0 before losing 4–1 to Arsenal in the quarter final stage. Nevertheless, the board were happy with the club's performance and income which the cup run generated.

== Final league table ==
Pos	Team	Pld	W	D	L	GF	GA	GAv	Pts
3	Chelsea	42	23	8	11	75	45	1.667	54
4	Preston North End	42	22	9	11	100	66	1.515	53
5	Stoke City	42	22	8	12	78	59	1.322	52
6	Swansea Town	42	18	12	12	75	63	1.190	48
7	Oldham Athletic	42	19	8	15	75	51	1.471	46

== Results ==
Stoke's score comes first

=== Legend ===
Win	Draw	Loss

=== Football League Second Division ===
Match	Date	Opponent	Venue	Result	Attendance	Scorers
1	27 August 1927	Southampton	A	6–3	12,000	Archibald, Williamson, Eyres, Wilson, Davies (2)
2	31 August 1927	West Bromwich Albion	A	4–2	20,000	Wilson (3), Armitage (pen)
3	3 September 1927	Notts County	H	3–0	21,941	Wilson (2), Archibald
4	5 September 1927	West Bromwich Albion	H	1–1	20,623	Wilson
5	10 September 1927	Oldham Athletic	A	1–3	8,000	Wilson
6	17 September 1927	Grimsby Town	H	0–0	15,480	
7	24 September 1927	Reading	A	1–1	5,700	Wilson
8	1 October 1927	Blackpool	H	2–0	12,014	Davies (2)
9	8 October 1927	Chelsea	A	0–1	16,000	
10	15 October 1927	Clapton Orient	H	2–0	13,002	Wilson, Williams
11	22 October 1927	Barnsley	H	0–0	9,320	
12	29 October 1927	Wolverhampton Wanderers	A	2–1	20,000	Wilson (2)
13	5 November 1927	Port Vale	H	0–2	24,972	
14	12 November 1927	Fulham	A	5–1	10,000	Wilson, Davies, Shirley (2), Barrett (o.g.)
15	19 November 1927	Swansea Town	H	1–1	9,937	Sellars
16	26 November 1927	Manchester City	A	0–4	39,897	
17	3 December 1927	Hull City	H	3–1	9,632	Wilson, Armitage, Johnson
18	10 December 1927	Preston North End	A	0–2	12,000	
19	17 December 1927	Nottingham Forest	H	1–3	9,090	Wallace (o.g.)
20	24 December 1927	Leeds United	A	1–5	20,000	Williamson
21	27 December 1927	South Shields	H	3–1	13,987	Sellars, Shirley (2)
22	31 December 1927	Southampton	H	2–1	8,251	Wilson, Davies
23	2 January 1928	South Shields	A	3–2	4,640	Archibald, Cull, Bussey
24	7 January 1928	Notts County	A	2–1	9,908	Wilson (2)
25	21 January 1928	Oldham Athletic	H	3–0	13,446	Wilson, Bussey (2)
26	4 February 1928	Reading	H	4–1	11,806	Bussey, Cull, Davies (2)
27	11 February 1928	Blackpool	A	1–3	6,309	Wilson
28	20 February 1928	Chelsea	H	1–0	10,223	Bussey
29	25 February 1928	Clapton Orient	A	2–3	6,140	Wilson, Campell (o.g.)
30	6 March 1928	Grimsby Town	A	2–1	5,076	Wilson, Sellars
31	10 March 1928	Wolverhampton Wanderers	H	2–2	13,273	Wilson, Davies
32	17 March 1928	Port Vale	A	0–0	25,084	
33	19 March 1928	Barnsley	A	1–3	6,000	Williams
34	24 March 1928	Fulham	H	5–1	10,117	Armitage (pen), Davies, Wilson (3)
35	31 March 1928	Swansea Town	A	1–1	5,460	Armitage
36	6 April 1928	Bristol City	A	0–4	8,112	
37	7 April 1928	Manchester City	H	2–0	27,453	Wilson, Archibald
38	9 April 1928	Bristol City	H	1–0	12,547	Wilson
39	14 April 1928	Hull City	A	0–1	6,552	
40	21 April 1928	Preston North End	H	3–2	11,233	Wilson (2), Archibald
41	28 April 1928	Nottingham Forest	A	2–0	9,043	Wilson, Davies
42	5 May 1928	Leeds United	H	5–1	12,306	Wilson (2), Bussey, Archibald, Cull

=== FA Cup ===
Round	Date	Opponent	Venue	Result	Attendance	Scorers
R3	14 January 1928	Gillingham	H	6–1	5,234	Wilson (2), Archibald, Williamson, Bussey, Davies
R4	28 January 1928	Bolton Wanderers	H	4–2	24,868	Davies, Archibald, Wilson (2)
R5	18 February 1928	Manchester City	A	1–0	50,132	Wilson
Quarter final	3 March 1928	Arsenal	A	1–4	41,974	Wilson

== Squad statistics ==
Pos.	Name	League		FA Cup		Total	
Pos.	Name	Apps	Goals	Apps	Goals	Apps	Goals
GK	(England) Bob Dixon	41	0	4	0	45	0
GK	(England) Dick Williams	1	0	0	0	1	0
DF	(Scotland) Bob McGrory	42	0	4	0	46	0
DF	(England) Billy Spencer	42	0	4	0	46	0
MF	(England) Len Armitage	38	4	3	0	41	4
MF	(England) Cecil Eastwood	7	0	0	0	7	0
MF	(Scotland) Thomas Godfrey	6	0	1	0	7	0
MF	(England) Peter Jackson	4	0	0	0	4	0
MF	(England) Harry Sellars	33	3	4	0	37	3
MF	(England) Harry Watson	2	0	0	0	2	0
MF	(Scotland) Tom Williamson	40	2	4	1	44	3
FW	(Scotland) Bobby Archibald	41	6	4	2	45	8
FW	(England) Walter Bussey	21	8	4	1	25	9
FW	(England) John Cull	19	3	4	0	23	3
FW	(England) Harry Davies	40	11	4	2	44	13
FW	(England) Jack Eyres	6	1	0	0	6	1
FW	(England) Dick Johnson	14	1	0	0	14	1
FW	(Scotland) Bob Lister	1	0	0	0	1	0
FW	(England) John Shirley	4	2	0	0	4	2
FW	(England) Joey Williams	20	2	0	0	20	2
FW	(England) Charlie Wilson	40	32	4	6	44	38
–	Own goals	–	3	–	0	–	3
