= Cecil Eastwood =

English footballer

Personal information
- Full name: Cecil Milner Eastwood
- Date of birth: 7 May 1894
- Place of birth: Castleford, England
- Date of death: 1968 (aged 74)
- Position: Wing half

Senior career*
Years	Team	Apps	(Gls)
- Castleford Town
1920–1923	Plymouth Argyle	108	(3)
1925–1926	Preston North End	20	(2)
1926–1927	Stoke City	46	(0)
1927	Stockport County	0	(0)
Total		174	(5)
- * Club domestic league appearances and goals

Cecil Milner Eastwood (7 May 1894 – 1968) was an English footballer who played in the Football League for Plymouth Argyle, Preston North End and Stoke City.

== Career ==
Eastwood was born in Castleford and began his career with Plymouth Argyle in 1920. He played four seasons under the management of Bob Jack as Plymouth tried in vain to gain promotion to the Second Division, finishing 2nd three seasons running. He signed for Preston North End where he spent the 1925–26 season before joining Stoke City. He helped the "Potters" to win the Third Division North at the first time of asking in 1926–27 but unfortunately for Eastwood he was not considered good enough for 2nd tier football and left in January 1928. He then had an unsuccessful spell at Stockport County.

== Career statistics ==
Appearances and goals by club, season and competition
Club	Season	League			FA Cup		Total	
Club	Season	Division	Apps	Goals	Apps	Goals	Apps	Goals
Plymouth Argyle	1920–21	Third Division	20	0	5	0	25	0
Plymouth Argyle	1921–22	Third Division South	31	0	2	0	33	0
Plymouth Argyle	1922–23	Third Division South	33	0	4	0	37	0
Plymouth Argyle	1923–24	Third Division South	24	3	0	0	24	3
Plymouth Argyle	1924–25	Third Division South	0	0	0	0	0	0
Plymouth Argyle	Total		108	3	11	0	119	3
Preston North End	1925–26	Second Division	20	2	2	0	22	2
Stoke City	1926–27	Third Division North	39	0	2	0	41	0
Stoke City	1927–28	Second Division	7	0	0	0	7	0
Stoke City	Total		46	0	2	0	48	0
Career total			174	5	15	0	189	5

== Honours ==
Stoke City

- Football League Third Division North Champions: 1926–27
