= Ewart Beswick =

English footballer (1897–1978)

Personal information
- Full name: John Ewart Beswick
- Date of birth: 5 April 1897
- Place of birth: Macclesfield, England
- Date of death: 20 February 1978 (aged 81)
- Place of death: Stoke-on-Trent, England
- Height: 6 ft 0 in (1.83 m)
- Position: Centre-half

Senior career*
Years	Team	Apps	(Gls)
1919	Longton		
1920	Congleton Town		
1921–1923	Stoke	25	(0)
1924	Congleton Town		
1925–1926	Stoke City	33	(1)
1927	Congleton Town		
Total		58	(1)
- * Club domestic league appearances and goals

John Ewart Beswick (5 April 1897 – 20 February 1978) was an English footballer who played in the Football League for Stoke.

== Career ==
Beswick was a defender who had two spells as the Victoria Ground, He was described as an intelligent ball playing centre-half who gave nothing away. The retired through injury at the end of his second spell, Beswick was one of the most successful amateurs to have served the club and helped Stoke to the Third Division North Title in 1926–27.

He was also a member of the famous pottery family Beswick, he continued to run the John Beswick Ltd company after his retirement from football until his death in 1978.

== Career statistics ==
Appearances and goals by club, season and competition
Club	Season	League			FA Cup		Total	
Club	Season	Division	Apps	Goals	Apps	Goals	Apps	Goals
Stoke	1921–22	Second Division	17	0	4	0	21	0
Stoke	1922–23	First Division	3	0	0	0	3	0
Stoke	1923–24	Second Division	5	0	0	0	5	0
Stoke	1925–26	Second Division	23	0	1	1	24	1
Stoke	1926–27	Third Division North	10	1	0	0	10	1
Career total			58	1	5	1	63	2

== Honours ==
with Stoke City

- Football League Third Division North Champions: 1926–27
