= 1926–27 Stoke City F.C. season =

Stoke City
1926–27 season
- Chairman: Mr A.McSherwin
- Manager: Tom Mather
- Stadium: Victoria Ground
- Football League Third Division North: 1st (63 Points)
- FA Cup: First Round
- Top goalscorer: League: Charlie Wilson (25); All: Charlie Wilson (26)
- Highest home attendance: 16,827 vs Crewe Alexandra (12 March 1927)
- Lowest home attendance: 6,778 vs Wigan Borough (30 August 1926)
- Average home league attendance: 10,311
Home colours

The 1926–27 season was Stoke City's 27th season in the Football League and the first in the Third Division North.

With relegation last season Stoke found themselves playing in the bottom tier of the Football League the Third Division North. Whilst there was obvious disappointment of the clubs failures it soon became clear that an instant return to the Second Division would be achieved as Stoke proved to be too good for their league opponents and ended the season as champions with 63 points and an impressive goal average of 2.3.

== Season review ==
=== League ===
After the trauma of two pretty bad seasons, there was to be a turn around in Stoke's fortunes in 1926–27 and from the outset there was never any doubt that promotion back to the Second Division would be achieved.

There had been reservations regarding the midfield, but manager Tom Mather gambled and switched Harry Sellars to right-half, brought in Cecil Eastwood from Preston North End to occupy left-half and slotted Tom Williamson between them. Thanks to the consistent form of this trio Stoke were on top of the league throughout the season, achieving ten doubles over their opponents. During the season a number of teams made their one and only trip to the Victoria Ground these were Ashington who were beaten 7–0, Durham City 4–0, Nelson 4–1, Wigan Borough 2–0 and New Brighton who managed a 1–1. In the return fixture against New Brighton Stoke produced what was easily their worst display of the season and crashed to a 5–0 defeat.

Stoke moved into April 1927 sitting on top of the table, but they were rocked by a 4–0 defeat to second place Rochdale. A 2–0 win over Tranmere Rovers eased the tensions but a 3–1 defeat at Doncaster Rovers on Good Friday put the celebrations on hold again, and although they beat Durham City 24 hours later, a goalless draw with Doncaster left Stoke with just a three-point lead over Rochdale. With three games remaining Stoke required four points to secure the title and with it promotion. However promotion was sealed in the next match against Accrington Stanley Stoke winning 1–0 thanks to a Jack Eyres goal and news that both Rochdale and Nelson had been beaten meant that Stoke took the title and returned to the Second Division at the first time of asking.

=== FA Cup ===
In the FA Cup Stoke were embarrassed as Welsh League side Rhyl Athletic took Stoke to a second replay before winning 2–1.

== Final league table ==
Pos	Team	Pld	W	D	L	GF	GA	GAv	Pts	Promotion
1	Stoke City	42	27	9	6	92	40	2.300	63	Division Champions, promoted
2	Rochdale	42	26	6	10	105	65	1.615	58	
3	Bradford Park Avenue	42	24	7	11	101	59	1.712	55	
4	Halifax Town	42	21	11	10	70	53	1.321	53	
5	Nelson	42	22	7	13	104	75	1.387	51	

Source: rsssf.com

== Results ==
Stoke's score comes first

=== Legend ===
Win	Draw	Loss

=== Football League Third Division North ===
Match	Date	Opponent	Venue	Result	Attendance	Scorers
1	28 August 1926	Bradford Park Avenue	H	0–0	11,388	
2	30 August 1926	Wigan Borough	H	2–0	6,778	Johnson, Wilson
3	4 September 1926	Walsall	A	1–0	7,000	Davies
4	6 September 1926	Wigan Borough	A	3–0	3,500	Bussey, Archibald, Wilson
5	11 September 1926	Nelson	H	4–1	10,557	Beswick, Johnson, Wilson (2)
6	13 September 1926	Hartlepools United	H	3–1	8,237	Davies, Wilson (2)
7	18 September 1926	Chesterfield	A	1–1	4,600	Wilson
8	22 September 1926	Hartlepools United	A	3–1	3,000	Wilson (2), Johnson
9	25 September 1926	Ashington	H	7–0	8,927	Wilson (5), Davies, Williams
10	2 October 1926	New Brighton	A	0–5	4,000	
11	9 October 1926	Wrexham	H	2–0	8,806	Wilson, Davies
12	16 October 1926	Barrow	H	4–0	9,638	Wilson (3), Bussey
13	23 October 1926	Crewe Alexandra	A	2–0	14,765	Wilson, Bussey
14	30 October 1926	Stockport County	H	0–1	12,523	
15	6 November 1926	Southport	A	3–0	3,500	Davies, Williams, Wilson
16	13 November 1926	Rochdale	H	3–1	11,144	Davies, Johnson, Williamson
17	20 November 1926	Tranmere Rovers	A	1–1	4,000	Williamson
18	4 December 1926	Accrington Stanley	A	1–0	5,000	Johnson
19	18 December 1926	Halifax Town	A	2–2	7,964	Bussey, Armitage
20	25 December 1926	Rotherham United	H	4–1	13,580	Bussey, Armitage (2), Wilson
21	27 December 1926	Rotherham United	A	2–2	4,000	Bussey, Wilson
22	1 January 1927	Lincoln City	H	2–0	12,035	Bussey, Armitage
23	8 January 1927	Durham City	H	4–0	7,382	Armitage, Williamson (2), Wilson
24	15 January 1927	Bradford Park Avenue	A	0–3	21,458	
25	22 January 1927	Walsall	H	4–1	10,125	Archibald, Davies, Eyres (2)
26	29 January 1927	Nelson	A	0–1	6,000	
27	5 February 1927	Chesterfield	H	3–2	9,759	Davies, Archibald, Williams
28	12 February 1927	Ashington	A	2–0	4,708	Williams, Eyres
29	19 February 1927	New Brighton	H	1–1	12,209	Williams
30	26 February 1927	Wrexham	A	6–2	4,000	Williams, Davies, Eyres (3), Wilson
31	5 March 1927	Barrow	A	0–0	4,155	
32	12 March 1927	Crewe Alexandra	H	2–1	16,827	Eyres, Watkin
33	19 March 1927	Stockport County	A	2–2	28,460	Watkin, Archibald
34	26 March 1927	Southport	H	4–0	7,826	Watkin, Davies, Williamson, Eyres
35	2 April 1927	Rochdale	A	0–4	3,338	
36	9 April 1927	Tranmere Rovers	H	2–0	6,950	Cull, Davies
37	15 April 1927	Doncaster Rovers	A	1–3	17,974	Archibald
38	16 April 1927	Durham City	A	2–1	2,956	Davies, Bussey
39	18 April 1927	Doncaster Rovers	H	0–0	15,903	
40	23 April 1927	Accrington Stanley	H	1–0	8,440	Eyres
41	30 April 1927	Lincoln City	A	3–1	3,330	Davies, Eyres, Wilson
42	7 May 1927	Halifax Town	H	5–1	10,280	Davies (2), Eyres (2), Archibald

=== FA Cup ===
Round	Date	Opponent	Venue	Result	Attendance	Scorers
R1	27 November 1926	Rhyl Athletic	A	1–1	5,000	Wilson
R1 Replay	2 December 1926	Rhyl Athletic	H	1–1	7,662	Davies
R1 2nd Replay	6 December 1926	Rhyl Athletic	N	1–2	3,000	Davies

== Squad statistics ==
Pos.	Name	League		FA Cup		Total	
Pos.	Name	Apps	Goals	Apps	Goals	Apps	Goals
GK	(England) Bob Dixon	41	0	3	0	44	0
GK	(England) Dick Williams	1	0	0	0	1	0
DF	(England) Arthur Beachill	1	0	0	0	1	0
DF	(Scotland) Bob McGrory	42	0	3	0	45	0
DF	(England) Billy Spencer	36	0	2	0	38	0
DF	(England) Harry Watson	0	0	1	0	1	0
MF	(England) Ewart Beswick	10	1	0	0	10	1
MF	(England) Tommy Dawson	5	0	1	0	6	0
MF	(England) Cecil Eastwood	39	0	2	0	41	0
MF	(England) Reginald Hodgkins	3	0	0	0	3	0
MF	(England) Peter Jackson	1	0	1	0	2	0
MF	(England) Harry Sellars	30	0	3	0	33	0
MF	(Scotland) Tom Williamson	28	5	2	0	30	5
FW	(Scotland) Bobby Archibald	37	6	0	0	37	6
FW	(England) Len Armitage	22	5	0	0	22	5
FW	(England) Walter Bussey	15	8	0	0	15	8
FW	(England) John Cull	10	1	0	0	10	1
FW	(England) Harry Davies	39	15	3	2	42	17
FW	(England) Jack Eyres	17	12	1	0	18	12
FW	(England) Charles Hallam	6	0	2	0	8	0
FW	(England) Dick Johnson	15	5	3	0	18	5
FW	(England) Frank Watkin	5	3	0	0	5	3
FW	(England) Joey Williams	28	6	3	0	31	6
FW	(England) Charlie Wilson	31	25	3	1	34	26
