= Reginald Hodgkins =

English footballer (1903–1927)

Personal information
- Full name: Reginald Thomas Hodgkins
- Date of birth: 7 January 1903
- Place of birth: Nuneaton, England
- Date of death: July 1927 (aged 24)
- Place of death: Coventry, England
- Position: Centre half

Senior career*
Years	Team	Apps	(Gls)
- Hinckley United
1925–1926	Stoke City	5	(0)
- * Club domestic league appearances and goals

Reginald Thomas Hodgkins (7 January 1903 – July 1927) was an English footballer who played in the Football League for Stoke City.

== Career ==
Hodgkins was born in Nuneaton and played for Hinckley United before joining Stoke City in 1925. He played twice in 1925–26 and three times in 1926–27. However, in July 1927 Hodgkins fell ill and died at the age of just 24.

== Career statistics ==
Appearances and goals by club, season and competition
Club	Season	League			FA Cup		Total	
Club	Season	Division	Apps	Goals	Apps	Goals	Apps	Goals
Stoke City	1925–26	Second Division	2	0	0	0	2	0
Stoke City	1926–27	Third Division North	3	0	0	0	3	0
Career total			5	0	0	0	5	0

== Honours ==
Stoke City

- Football League Third Division North champions: 1926–27
