= Charlie Wilson (footballer, born 1895) =

English footballer

Personal information
- Full name: Charles Wilson
- Date of birth: 30 March 1895
- Place of birth: Atherstone, England
- Date of death: May 1971 (aged 76)
- Place of death: Stafford, England
- Height: 5 ft 9 in (1.75 m)
- Position: Centre forward

Senior career*
Years	Team	Apps	(Gls)
1913–1914	Atherstone Town		
1914–1918	Coventry City	0	(0)
1919–1922	Tottenham Hotspur	55	(27)
1922–1925	Huddersfield Town	99	(57)
1925–1930	Stoke City	156	(112)
1930–1932	Stafford Rangers		
1933	Wrexham	0	(0)
1934	Shrewsbury Town		
1935	Alfreton United		
Total		310	(196)
- * Club domestic league appearances and goals

Charles Wilson (30 March 1895 – May 1971) was an English footballer who played in the Football League for Tottenham Hotspur, Huddersfield Town and Stoke City.

== Career ==
Wilson was born in Atherstone, Warwickshire and began his career with local non-league side Atherstone Town before joining Southern League side Coventry City just before the outbreak of World War I.

After being demobbed he played six times for Tottenham Hotspur in the 1918–19 season, although for reasons unknown he decided to hide his identity. In four of these games he played under the name of "C. Williams" being described as a "clot from the Midlands" and in the other under the pseudonym of "C. Forshaw". Only in the sixth did he finally take to the field as Charlie Wilson. With the war over the Football League returned and Wilson scored a hat-trick on his Spurs debut proper in a 3–0 victory over South Shields at Horsley Hill in September 1919. He scored 11 goals for Spurs in the 1919–20 season helping them claim the old Second Division title.

He scored 9 goals in 1920–21 and 11 in 1921–22 witch prompted Huddersfield Town manager Herbert Chapman to bring Wilson to Leeds Road. He soon became a key member of Towns all conquering 1920s side as he scored 16 goals in 1922–23 as Huddersfield finished in 3rd position. He then scored 20 goals in 1923–24 and 24 in 1924–25 as Huddersfield claimed the First Division title. However, with Huddersfield on their way to a third straight title Wilson picked up an injury early in the 1925–26 season and so decided to put him up for sale.

Stoke City manager Tom Mather persuaded Wilson to join the Victoria Ground side and he joined Stoke along with his Huddersfield Town teammate, Joey Williams. The pair could not prevent Stoke slipping to relegation to the Third Division North. In 1926–27 Wilson's quality in front of goal proved too much for Third Division defences as he racked up 26 goals as Stoke won the title with ease. Back in the Second Division for 1927–28 Wilson had a fine season scoring a club record 38 goals. He continued to be top scorer hitting 22 in 1928–29 and 20 in 1929–30 becoming the first Stoke player to reach 100 league goals. He struggled with injury in 1930–31 scoring 10 in 16 games and left the club at the end of the season.

After leaving Stoke he played non-league football with Stafford Rangers whilst keeping the Doxey Hotel. He later played for Wrexham, Shrewsbury Town and Alfreton United before later becoming landlord of the Noah's Ark pub in Stafford. He died in May 1971 at the age of 76.

== Career statistics ==
Appearances and goals by club, season and competition
Club	Season	League			FA Cup		Total	
Club	Season	Division	Apps	Goals	Apps	Goals	Apps	Goals
Tottenham Hotspur	1919–20	Second Division	12	7	2	4	14	11
Tottenham Hotspur	1920–21	First Division	20	9	0	0	20	9
Tottenham Hotspur	1921–22	First Division	21	11	5	2	26	13
Tottenham Hotspur	1922–23	First Division	2	0	0	0	2	0
Tottenham Hotspur	Total		55	27	7	6	62	33
Huddersfield Town	1922–23	First Division	26	13	5	3	31	16
Huddersfield Town	1923–24	First Division	31	18	2	2	33	20
Huddersfield Town	1924–25	First Division	38	24	1	0	39	24
Huddersfield Town	1925–26	First Division	4	2	0	0	4	2
Huddersfield Town	Total		99	57	8	5	107	62
Stoke City	1925–26	Second Division	11	3	0	0	11	3
Stoke City	1926–27	Third Division North	31	25	3	1	34	26
Stoke City	1927–28	Second Division	40	32	4	6	44	38
Stoke City	1928–29	Second Division	31	22	0	0	31	22
Stoke City	1929–30	Second Division	27	20	1	0	28	20
Stoke City	1930–31	Second Division	16	10	3	1	19	11
Stoke City	Total		156	112	11	8	167	120
Career total			310	196	26	19	337	215

== Honours ==
Tottenham Hotspur

- Football League Second Division Champions: 1919–20

Huddersfield Town

- Football League First Division Champions (3): 1923–24, 1924–25, 1925–26

Stoke City

- Football League Third Division North Champions: 1926–27
