= Joey Williams =

English footballer

Personal information
- Full name: Joseph Joshua Williams
- Date of birth: 4 June 1902
- Place of birth: Rotherham, England
- Date of death: 1978 (aged 76)
- Height: 5 ft 4 in (1.63 m)
- Position: Outside forward

Senior career*
Years	Team	Apps	(Gls)
1921–1924	Rotherham County	95	(7)
1924–1926	Huddersfield Town	58	(6)
1926–1929	Stoke City	82	(17)
1929–1932	Arsenal	22	(5)
1932–1935	Middlesbrough	78	(11)
1935–1936	Carlisle United	20	(2)
Total		355	(48)

International career
1929	FA XI	2	(?)
- * Club domestic league appearances and goals

Joseph Joshua Williams (4 June 1902 – 1978) was an English footballer. Williams featured for clubs Arsenal, Carlisle United, Huddersfield Town, Middlesbrough, Rotherham County and Stoke City in his playing career.

== Career ==
Williams was an outside forward who started out with his hometown club Rotherham County, for whom he played over a hundred games. In the summer of 1924 he was signed by Huddersfield Town. At Huddersfield he won two First Division titles in 1924–25 and 1925–26. During the 1925–26 season he played 23 league games for Huddersfield. Williams then moved to Stoke City in March 1926, of whom were relegated from the Second Division. He helped Stoke gain an instant return to the Second Division winning the Third Division North in 1926–27 as he scored six goals in 31 appearances. Williams thus became the first player to be relegated and win a League Championship medal in the same season. He was capped 20 times in 1927–28 as Stoke finished fifth. He then scored a career best of seven goals in the following season.

In the summer of 1929, he toured South Africa with an FA XI, earning two caps. On his return to England in September 1929 he moved to Arsenal, being signed by his former boss at Huddersfield Herbert Chapman. Williams made his Arsenal debut in a 5–2 defeat at Aston Villa on 25 September 1929. The following month he played in the 1929 FA Charity Shield, for the Professionals against the Amateurs at The Den, which the Professionals won 3–0.

Williams played sixteen times in the 1929–30 season, and helped Arsenal on their run to the 1930 FA Cup final. He was injured in a match against Newcastle United at the start of April 1930 and consequently missed the cup final. Returning the following season, he made only nine appearances. These came as an understudy to Joe Hulme and Cliff Bastin who had established themselves as first-choice wingers, and he thus missed out on a third Championship medal. Williams made one more appearance for Arsenal before leaving in March 1932; in total he played 26 games for Arsenal, scoring five goals.

Williams then joined up with Middlesbrough who he played with for another four seasons. He then ended his playing days at Carlisle United in the 1935–36 season.

== Career statistics ==
Appearances and goals by club, season and competition
Club	Season	League			FA Cup		Total	
Club	Season	Division	Apps	Goals	Apps	Goals	Apps	Goals
Rotherham County	1921–22	Second Division	21	2	2	0	23	2
Rotherham County	1922–23	Second Division	32	2	1	0	33	2
Rotherham County	1923–24	Third Division North	42	3	3	1	45	4
Rotherham County	Total		95	7	6	1	101	8
Huddersfield Town	1924–25	First Division	35	0	1	0	36	0
Huddersfield Town	1925–26	First Division	23	6	1	0	24	6
Huddersfield Town	Total		58	6	2	0	60	6
Stoke City	1925–26	Second Division	11	2	0	0	11	2
Stoke City	1926–27	Third Division North	28	6	3	0	31	6
Stoke City	1927–28	Second Division	20	2	0	0	20	2
Stoke City	1928–29	Second Division	23	7	1	0	24	7
Stoke City	Total		82	17	4	0	86	17
Arsenal	1929–30	First Division	12	3	4	0	16	3
Arsenal	1930–31	First Division	9	2	0	0	9	2
Arsenal	1931–32	First Division	1	0	0	0	1	0
Arsenal	Total		22	5	4	0	26	5
Middlesbrough	1931–32	First Division	11	1	0	0	11	1
Middlesbrough	1932–33	First Division	30	6	4	1	34	7
Middlesbrough	1933–34	First Division	23	3	1	0	24	3
Middlesbrough	1934–35	First Division	14	1	2	1	16	2
Middlesbrough	Total		78	11	7	2	85	13
Carlisle United	1935–36	Third Division North	16	1	1	0	17	1
Carlisle United	1936–37	Third Division North	4	1	0	0	4	1
Carlisle United	Total		20	1	1	0	21	1
Career total			355	48	24	3	380	51

== Honours ==
Huddersfield Town

- Football League First Division: 1924–25, 1925–26

Stoke City

- Football League Third Division North: 1926–27

Arsenal

- Football League First Division: 1930–31
