= Dick Johnson (footballer) =

English footballer (1895–1933)

Personal information
- Full name: Richard Kemp Johnson
- Date of birth: 1895
- Place of birth: Gateshead, England
- Date of death: 3 January 1933 (aged 38)
- Height: 5 ft 6 1/2 in (1.69 m)
- Position: Forward

Senior career*
Years	Team	Apps	(Gls)
1911–1912	Victoria Adelaide		
1912	Bensham		
1912	Hebburn Argyle		
1913	Marley Hill United		
1913–1914	Bensham		
1914–1915	Felling Colliery		
1919–1924	Liverpool	77	(28)
1925–1928	Stoke City	78	(21)
1929–1930	New Brighton	74	(23)
1931	Connah's Quay & Shotton		
1931	Brenka		
Total		229	(72)
- * Club domestic league appearances and goals

Richard Kemp Johnson (1895 – 3 January 1933) was an English footballer who played in the Football League for Liverpool, New Brighton and Stoke City.

== Career ==
Johnson was born in Gateshead and played for Victoria Adelaide, Bensham, Hebburn Argyle, Marley Hill United and Felling Colliery before joining Liverpool in 1919. He scored 13 goals in 27 games in 1920–21 and his 16 goals in 41 in 1922–23 helped the Anfield side to win the Football League First Division. He left for Stoke City in February 1925 and he scored four goals towards the end of the 1924–25 season to help Stoke avoid the drop however relegation was suffered the following season. He helped Stoke gain an instant return winning the Football League Third Division North in 1926–27 and then became a backup player until his departure to New Brighton in August 1929. He spent two seasons at New Brighton and the left for Welsh League side Connah's Quay & Shotton before his death at the age of 38 in 1933.

== Career statistics ==
Club	Season	League			FA Cup		Total	
Club	Season	Division	Apps	Goals	Apps	Goals	Apps	Goals
Liverpool	1919–20	First Division	1	0	0	0	1	0
Liverpool	1920–21	First Division	26	13	1	0	27	13
Liverpool	1921–22	First Division	0	0	0	0	0	0
Liverpool	1922–23	First Division	37	14	4	2	41	16
Liverpool	1923–24	First Division	2	0	0	0	2	0
Liverpool	1924–25	First Division	11	1	0	0	11	1
Liverpool	Total		77	28	5	2	82	30
Stoke City	1924–25	Second Division	13	4	0	0	13	4
Stoke City	1925–26	Second Division	31	9	2	4	33	13
Stoke City	1926–27	Third Division North	15	5	3	0	18	5
Stoke City	1927–28	Second Division	14	1	0	0	14	1
Stoke City	1928–29	Second Division	5	2	0	0	5	2
Stoke City	Total		78	21	5	4	83	25
New Brighton	1929–30	Third Division North	36	17	2	1	38	18
New Brighton	1930–31	Third Division North	38	6	1	0	39	6
New Brighton	Total		74	23	3	1	77	24
Career Total			229	72	13	7	242	79

== Honours ==
Liverpool

- Football League First Division champions: 1922–23

Stoke City

- Football League Third Division North champions: 1926–27
