= John Cull (footballer) =

English footballer

Personal information
- Full name: John Ernest Cull
- Date of birth: 18 November 1900
- Place of birth: Aston, England
- Date of death: 1964 (aged 63–64)
- Position: Forward

Senior career*
Years	Team	Apps	(Gls)
1923–1925	Shrewsbury Town		
1925–1930	Stoke City	75	(9)
1931–1932	Coventry City	17	(4)
1932–1933	Shrewsbury Town		
1933–1934	Crewe Alexandra	30	(13)
1934–1935	Accrington Stanley	38	(6)
1935–1936	Gateshead	19	(5)
1936	Aldershot	3	(0)
Total		182	(37)
- * Club domestic league appearances and goals

John Ernest Cull (8 November 1900 – 1964) was a footballer who played in the Football League for Accrington Stanley, Aldershot, Crewe Alexandra, Coventry City, Gateshead and Stoke City.

== Career ==
Cull was born in Aston and played non-league football with Shrewsbury Town before impressing enough to earn a move to Stoke City in 1925. He was never able to fully establish himself in the "Potters" starting eleven being mainly used as back up. He spent five years at the Victoria Ground making 80 appearances scoring nine goals. After leaving Stoke, Cull went on to play for six different clubs spending a season at each. He played for Coventry City, Shrewsbury Town, Crewe Alexandra, Accrington Stanley, Gateshead before ending his career with Aldershot.

== Career statistics ==
Appearances and goals by club, season and competition
Club	Season	League			FA Cup		Other		Total	
Club	Season	Division	Apps	Goals	Apps	Goals	Apps	Goals	Apps	Goals
Stoke City	1925–26	Second Division	3	0	0	0	—		3	0
Stoke City	1926–27	Third Division North	10	1	0	0	—		10	1
Stoke City	1927–28	Second Division	19	3	4	0	—		23	3
Stoke City	1928–29	Second Division	8	1	0	0	—		8	1
Stoke City	1929–30	Second Division	22	3	1	0	—		23	3
Stoke City	1930–31	Second Division	13	1	0	0	—		13	1
Stoke City	Total		75	9	5	0	—		80	9
Coventry City	1931–32	Third Division South	17	4	0	0	—		17	4
Crewe Alexandra	1933–34	Third Division North	30	13	1	0	2 (Note: Appearances in Football League Third Division North Cup)	0	33	13
Accrington Stanley	1934–35	Third Division North	38	6	1	0	1	0	40	6
Gateshead	1935–36	Third Division North	19	5	1	0	0	0	20	5
Aldershot	1935–36	Third Division South	3	0	0	0	0	0	3	0
Career total			182	37	8	0	3	0	193	37

== Honours ==
with Stoke City

- Football League Third Division North Champions: 1926–27
