= Paddy Turley =

Irish footballer

Personal information
- Date of birth: 1908
- Place of birth: Newry, Ireland
- Date of death: before 1960
- Position: Defender

Senior career*
Years	Team	Apps	(Gls)
1925–1928	Newry Town		
1928–1931	Stoke City	5	(0)
1931–1934	Belfast Celtic		
- * Club domestic league appearances and goals

Paddy Turley (1908 – before 1960) was an Irish footballer who played in the Football League for Stoke City.

== Career ==
Turley played for his home town club Newry Town before joining English side Stoke City in 1928. He was not able to establish himself in the first team and after making just five appearances in three seasons at the Victoria Ground he returned to Ireland with St Patrick's Athletic.

== Career statistics ==
Club	Season	League			FA Cup		Total	
Club	Season	Division	Apps	Goals	Apps	Goals	Apps	Goals
Stoke City	1928–29	Second Division	1	0	0	0	1	0
Stoke City	1929–30	Second Division	1	0	0	0	1	0
Stoke City	1930–31	Second Division	3	0	0	0	3	0
Career Total			5	0	0	0	5	0
