= 1925–26 Stoke City F.C. season =

Stoke City
1925–26 season
- Chairman: Mr A.McSherwin
- Manager: Tom Mather
- Stadium: Victoria Ground
- Football League Second Division: 21st (32 Points)
- FA Cup: Fourth Round
- Top goalscorer: League: Harry Davies & Bobby Archibald (10); All: Harry Davies & Dick Johnson (13)
- Highest home attendance: 21,782 vs Port Vale (7 September 1925)
- Lowest home attendance: 6,670 vs Bradford City (27 February 1926)
- Average home league attendance: 12,144
Home colours

The 1925–26 season was Stoke City's 26th season in the Football League and the seventh in the Second Division. It was also the first season under the name of Stoke City.

Stoke-on-Trent was granted city status in 1925 and so Stoke added the word 'City' to their name and have since been forever known as Stoke City. However, despite a change of name there was no change in fortunes on the pitch as Stoke failed to improve after last season's narrow escape and they were relegated to the Third Division North this time finishing one point from safety.

== Season review ==
=== League ===
The 1925–26 season was a season of change as Stoke F.C. became Stoke City F.C. and there was a new offside law introduced which allowed two opponents (not three as before) to be between the attacker and the goal. This change prompted many high scoring matches throughout the county as teams struggled to adapt the changes with the traditional 2–3–5 formation, eventually teams started to use new formations and tactics. But Stoke did not share the high scoring and they struggled all season with many disappointing displays.

Injuries certainly hampered the team's efforts throughout the season and by the new year relegation looked inevitable and despite a late revival a failure to beat Southampton on the final day of the season sealed Stoke's fate and they dropped into the third tier for the first time. However the signing of Huddersfield Town's Charlie Wilson in March 1926 proved to be a vital addition as he would be key in making sure Stoke's stay in the Third Division North would be a short one.

=== FA Cup ===
With sides in the top two divisions now starting in the third round Stoke played Wigan Borough and beat them 5–2 however Stoke themselves were on the receiving end of a heavy cup defeat losing 6–3 to Swansea Town in the fourth round.

== Final league table ==
| Pos | Team | Pld | W | D | L | GF | GA | GAv | Pts | Promotion or relegation |
|---|---|---|---|---|---|---|---|---|---|---|
| 18 | Barnsley | 42 | 12 | 12 | 18 | 58 | 84 | 0.690 | 36 | |
| 19 | Fulham | 42 | 11 | 12 | 19 | 46 | 77 | 0.597 | 34 | |
| 20 | Clapton Orient | 42 | 12 | 9 | 21 | 50 | 65 | 0.769 | 33 | |
| 21 | Stoke City | 42 | 12 | 8 | 22 | 54 | 77 | 0.701 | 32 | Relegated |
| 22 | Stockport County | 42 | 8 | 9 | 25 | 51 | 97 | 0.526 | 25 | Relegated |

== Results ==
Stoke's score comes first

=== Legend ===
| Win | Draw | Loss |

=== Football League Second Division ===
| Match | Date | Opponent | Venue | Result | Attendance | Scorers |
|---|---|---|---|---|---|---|
| 1 | 29 August 1925 | Stockport County | H | 3–0 | 17,296 | Clennell (2), Archibald |
| 2 | 31 August 1925 | Port Vale | A | 0–3 | 20,000 | |
| 3 | 5 September 1925 | Fulham | A | 4–2 | 10,000 | Davies (2), Ralphs (2) |
| 4 | 7 September 1925 | Port Vale | H | 0–3 | 21,782 | |
| 5 | 12 September 1925 | South Shields | H | 0–1 | 13,334 | |
| 6 | 14 September 1925 | Oldham Athletic | A | 2–7 | 6,680 | Sellars, Howe (pen) |
| 7 | 19 September 1925 | Preston North End | A | 0–2 | 10,000 | |
| 8 | 26 September 1925 | Middlesbrough | H | 4–0 | 9,617 | Paterson (3), Archibald |
| 9 | 3 October 1925 | Portsmouth | A | 0–2 | 12,000 | |
| 10 | 10 October 1925 | Wolverhampton Wanderers | H | 0–0 | 15,609 | |
| 11 | 17 October 1925 | Bradford City | H | 1–0 | 8,377 | Davies |
| 12 | 24 October 1925 | Derby County | A | 3–7 | 15,000 | Davies (2), Paterson |
| 13 | 31 October 1925 | Clapton Orient | H | 0–0 | 9,106 | |
| 14 | 7 November 1925 | Barnsley | A | 1–2 | 10,000 | D Johnson |
| 15 | 14 November 1925 | Blackpool | H | 1–3 | 8,529 | Archibald |
| 16 | 21 November 1925 | Darlington | A | 2–1 | 8,529 | D Johnson, Clennell |
| 17 | 28 November 1925 | Hull City | H | 3–1 | 7,155 | D Johnson, Clennell, Archibald |
| 18 | 5 December 1925 | Chelsea | A | 1–1 | 15,000 | Davies |
| 19 | 12 December 1925 | Nottingham Forest | H | 1–1 | 9,033 | Archibald |
| 20 | 19 December 1925 | Southampton | A | 2–1 | 9,033 | D Johnson, Clennell |
| 21 | 25 December 1925 | Swansea Town | A | 1–1 | 12,000 | Davies |
| 22 | 26 December 1925 | Swansea Town | H | 1–1 | 19,814 | Ralphs |
| 23 | 2 January 1926 | Stockport County | A | 1–2 | 6,600 | Walker |
| 24 | 16 January 1926 | Fulham | H | 5–0 | 7,565 | D Johnson (4), Archibald |
| 25 | 23 January 1926 | South Shields | A | 1–5 | 5,000 | Davies |
| 26 | 6 February 1926 | Middlesbrough | A | 0–3 | 8,800 | |
| 27 | 13 February 1926 | Portsmouth | H | 2–1 | 11,724 | Davies, Clifford (o.g.) |
| 28 | 20 February 1926 | Wolverhampton Wanderers | A | 1–5 | 15,000 | Clennell |
| 29 | 22 February 1926 | Preston North End | H | 1–3 | 10,140 | Archibald |
| 30 | 27 February 1926 | Bradford City | A | 1–2 | 6,140 | Davies |
| 31 | 6 March 1926 | Derby County | H | 0–1 | 14,808 | |
| 32 | 13 March 1926 | Clapton Orient | A | 0–4 | 8,000 | |
| 33 | 20 March 1926 | Barnsley | H | 1–2 | 18,638 | Archibald |
| 34 | 27 March 1926 | Blackpool | A | 0–0 | 7,500 | |
| 35 | 3 April 1926 | Darlington | H | 6–1 | 13,811 | Clennell (2), Archibald, Wilson, Williams (2) |
| 36 | 5 April 1926 | The Wednesday | H | 0–1 | 18,138 | |
| 37 | 6 April 1926 | The Wednesday | A | 0–2 | 20,000 | |
| 38 | 10 April 1926 | Hull City | A | 0–1 | 6,000 | |
| 39 | 17 April 1926 | Chelsea | H | 1–3 | 10,219 | Wilson |
| 40 | 24 April 1926 | Nottingham Forest | A | 2–1 | 12,000 | Archibald, Sellars |
| 41 | 26 April 1926 | Oldham Athletic | H | 1–0 | 8,461 | Wilson |
| 42 | 1 May 1926 | Southampton | H | 1–1 | 8,012 | D Johnson |

=== FA Cup ===
| Round | Date | Opponent | Venue | Result | Attendance | Scorers |
|---|---|---|---|---|---|---|
| R3 | 9 January 1926 | Wigan Borough | A | 5–2 | 3,992 | D Johnson (3), Davies (2) |
| R4 | 30 January 1926 | Swansea Town | A | 3–6 | 21,000 | D Johnson, Davies, Beswick |

== Squad statistics ==
| Pos. | Name | League | | FA Cup | | Total | |
| Pos. | Name | Apps | Goals | Apps | Goals | Apps | Goals |
|---|---|---|---|---|---|---|---|
| GK | (Scotland) Kenny Campbell | 7 | 0 | 0 | 0 | 7 | 0 |
| GK | (England) Bob Dixon | 34 | 0 | 2 | 0 | 36 | 0 |
| GK | (England) Percy Knott | 1 | 0 | 0 | 0 | 1 | 0 |
| DF | (England) Tommy Howe | 6 | 1 | 0 | 0 | 6 | 1 |
| DF | (Scotland) Bob McGrory | 36 | 0 | 2 | 0 | 38 | 0 |
| DF | (England) Alec Milne | 25 | 0 | 2 | 0 | 27 | 0 |
| DF | (England) Harold Robson | 1 | 0 | 0 | 0 | 1 | 0 |
| DF | (England) Billy Spencer | 16 | 0 | 0 | 0 | 16 | 0 |
| MF | (England) Ewart Beswick | 23 | 0 | 1 | 1 | 24 | 1 |
| MF | (England) Harry Brough | 5 | 0 | 0 | 0 | 5 | 0 |
| MF | (England) Tommy Dawson | 8 | 0 | 0 | 0 | 8 | 0 |
| MF | (Scotland) George Dickie | 1 | 0 | 0 | 0 | 1 | 0 |
| MF | (England) Reginald Hodgkins | 2 | 0 | 0 | 0 | 2 | 0 |
| MF | (England) Peter Jackson | 10 | 0 | 0 | 0 | 10 | 0 |
| MF | (England) Sam Johnson | 30 | 0 | 2 | 0 | 32 | 0 |
| MF | (England) Alec McClure | 4 | 0 | 2 | 0 | 6 | 0 |
| MF | (England) Harry Sellars | 13 | 2 | 0 | 0 | 13 | 2 |
| MF | (England) John Walker | 25 | 1 | 1 | 0 | 26 | 1 |
| FW | (Scotland) Bobby Archibald | 42 | 10 | 2 | 0 | 44 | 10 |
| FW | (England) Len Armitage | 14 | 0 | 0 | 0 | 14 | 0 |
| FW | (England) Walter Bussey | 4 | 0 | 0 | 0 | 4 | 0 |
| FW | (England) Joe Clennell | 24 | 8 | 2 | 0 | 26 | 8 |
| FW | (England) John Cull | 3 | 0 | 0 | 0 | 3 | 0 |
| FW | (England) Harry Davies | 30 | 10 | 2 | 3 | 32 | 13 |
| FW | (England) Jack Eyres | 3 | 0 | 0 | 0 | 3 | 0 |
| FW | (England) Charles Hallam | 6 | 0 | 0 | 0 | 6 | 0 |
| FW | (England) Dick Johnson | 31 | 9 | 2 | 4 | 33 | 13 |
| FW | (England) Charles Kelly | 1 | 0 | 0 | 0 | 1 | 0 |
| FW | (Scotland) James Maxwell | 10 | 0 | 0 | 0 | 10 | 0 |
| FW | (Scotland) George Paterson | 7 | 4 | 0 | 0 | 7 | 4 |
| FW | (England) Bert Ralphs | 16 | 3 | 2 | 0 | 18 | 3 |
| FW | (England) Arthur Watkin | 2 | 0 | 0 | 0 | 2 | 0 |
| FW | (England) Joey Williams | 11 | 2 | 0 | 0 | 11 | 2 |
| FW | (England) Charlie Wilson | 11 | 3 | 0 | 0 | 11 | 3 |
| – | Own goals | – | 1 | – | 0 | – | 1 |
