= 1928–29 Stoke City F.C. season =

Stoke City
1928–29 season
- Chairman: Mr A.McSherwin
- Manager: Tom Mather
- Stadium: Victoria Ground
- Football League Second Division: 6th (46 Points)
- FA Cup: Third Round
- Top goalscorer: League: Charlie Wilson (22); All: Charlie Wilson (22)
- Highest home attendance: 36,182 vs Port Vale (15 September 1928)
- Lowest home attendance: 7,158 vs Oldham Athletic (24 November 1928)
- Average home league attendance: 13,666
Home colours

The 1928–29 season was Stoke City's 29th season in the Football League and the ninth in the Second Division.

There were no major signings in 1928–29 as the club decided to change a number of policies regarding players' contracts in order to avoid a repeat of the scenes at the end of the 1923–24 season. Mather also brought in a number of players from the club's reserve and youth teams as the squad held a solid defence and with only 51 goals conceded Stoke had the best defensive record in the top two divisions. Stoke finished the season in sixth place which the fans thought they could have done better considering their defensive qualities.

== Season review ==
=== League ===
The Stoke board acquired the freehold of the Victoria Ground in the summer of 1928, but decided against any major signings for the 1928–29 campaign, as young players were slowly being introduced into the first team and reserve side. After some of the players' actions of 1924, chairman Sherwin along with the board and manager decided to sort out the respective salaries of their professional players in order to avoid any further problems.

Stoke had a solid look to their squad and they started the season in perfect fashion beating Nottingham Forest 5–1 on the opening day of the season at a stunned City Ground. Stoke's good form continued and by the end of October the team was in a good position to mount a promotion challenge. However they won just one match in November and December and although they did pick up in the new year Stoke were unable to challenge for a promotion spot and finished the season in sixth place. Some supporters felt the team should have done better, especially as they had the best defensive record outside the First Division. Fans were also disappointed at the sale of favourite Harry Davies to Huddersfield Town, he would later return to the club in 1931.

=== FA Cup ===
Arsenal knocked Stoke out of the FA Cup for the second season running this time in the third round.

== Final league table ==
Pos	Team	Pld	W	D	L	GF	GA	GAv	Pts
4	Southampton	42	17	14	11	74	60	1.233	48
5	Notts County	42	19	9	14	78	65	1.200	47
6	Stoke City	42	17	12	13	74	51	1.451	46
7	West Bromwich Albion	42	19	8	15	80	79	1.013	46
8	Blackpool	42	19	7	16	92	76	1.211	45

== Results ==
Stoke's score comes first

=== Legend ===
Win	Draw	Loss

=== Football League Second Division ===
Match	Date	Opponent	Venue	Result	Attendance	Scorers
1	25 August 1928	Nottingham Forest	A	5–1	14,548	Wilson (2), Davies, Bussey, Liddle
2	27 August 1928	Bristol City	H	2–0	14,067	Davies, Armitage (pen)
3	1 September 1928	West Bromwich Albion	H	4–1	22,769	Davies, Armitage (pen), Wilson, Archibald
4	5 September 1928	Bristol City	A	1–1	10,000	Davies
5	8 September 1928	Clapton Orient	A	0–1	6,000	
6	15 September 1928	Port Vale	H	2–1	36,182	Davies, Bussey
7	22 September 1928	Grimsby Town	H	1–2	15,512	Wilson
8	29 September 1928	Bradford Park Avenue	A	1–2	12,000	Davies
9	6 October 1928	Swansea Town	H	5–0	12,671	Johnson (2), Williams, Bussey, Armitage
10	13 October 1928	Blackpool	A	0–2	8,000	
11	20 October 1928	Hull City	A	3–1	7,760	Davies, Archibald, Bussey
12	27 October 1928	Tottenham Hotspur	H	2–0	15,307	Archibald, Williams
13	3 November 1928	Reading	A	1–1	6,800	Williams
14	10 November 1928	Millwall	H	0–0	9,185	
15	17 November 1928	Middlesbrough	A	0–1	10,000	
16	24 November 1928	Oldham Athletic	H	1–1	7,185	Davies
17	1 December 1928	Southampton	A	0–0	8,000	
18	8 December 1928	Wolverhampton Wanderers	H	4–3	9,012	Wilson (2), Williams, Archibald
19	15 December 1928	Notts County	A	0–1	8,000	
20	22 December 1928	Preston North End	H	1–1	10,263	Wilson
21	25 December 1928	Chelsea	H	0–1	12,031	
22	26 December 1928	Chelsea	A	1–3	40,126	Wilson
23	29 December 1928	Nottingham Forest	H	1–1	8,120	Wilson
24	5 January 1929	West Bromwich Albion	A	3–2	20,067	Shirley, Archibald, Bussey
25	19 January 1929	Clapton Orient	H	3–1	10,166	Cull, Wilson, Williamson
26	26 January 1929	Port Vale	A	2–1	18,304	Shirley (2)
27	2 February 1929	Grimsby Town	A	1–2	8,000	Bussey
28	9 February 1929	Bradford Park Avenue	H	2–0	11,865	Archibald, Davies
29	16 February 1929	Swansea Town	A	3–3	7,000	Davies, Bussey, Mawson
30	23 February 1929	Blackpool	H	1–1	12,538	Ramsay (o.g.)
31	2 March 1929	Hull City	H	1–1	10,925	Shirley
32	9 March 1929	Tottenham Hotspur	A	0–1	26,760	
33	16 March 1929	Reading	H	5–0	9,491	Shirley, Williams (2), Wilson (2)
34	23 March 1929	Millwall	A	3–1	5,500	Wilson, Archibald, Williamson
35	29 March 1929	Barnsley	A	2–4	6,000	Wilson, Bussey
36	30 March 1929	Middlesbrough	H	3–2	19,717	Wilson (2), Bussey
37	1 April 1929	Barnsley	H	0–0	13,126	
38	6 April 1929	Oldham Athletic	A	0–1	5,500	
39	13 April 1929	Southampton	H	3–0	8,556	Wilson (3)
40	20 April 1929	Wolverhampton Wanderers	A	0–4	12,235	
41	27 April 1929	Notts County	H	5–0	8,165	Wilson (3), Bussey, Williams
42	4 May 1929	Preston North End	A	2–2	6,000	Bussey, Williamson

=== FA Cup ===
Round	Date	Opponent	Venue	Result	Attendance	Scorers
R3	12 January 1929	Arsenal	A	1–2	30,762	Bussey

== Squad statistics ==
Pos.	Name	League		FA Cup		Total	
Pos.	Name	Apps	Goals	Apps	Goals	Apps	Goals
GK	(England) Bob Dixon	7	0	0	0	7	0
GK	(Wales) Ormond Jones	0	0	0	0	0	0
GK	(England) Dick Williams	35	0	1	0	36	0
DF	(England) Arthur Beachill	4	0	0	0	4	0
DF	(England) Tommy Dawson	2	0	0	0	2	0
DF	(Scotland) Bob McGrory	38	0	1	0	39	0
DF	(England) Billy Spencer	40	0	1	0	41	0
MF	(England) Len Armitage	39	3	1	0	40	3
MF	(Scotland) Thomas Godfrey	2	0	0	0	2	0
MF	(England) Peter Jackson	10	0	0	0	10	0
MF	Paddy Turley	1	0	0	0	1	0
MF	(England) Harry Sellars	40	0	1	0	41	0
MF	(Scotland) Tom Williamson	33	3	1	0	34	3
FW	(Scotland) Bobby Archibald	41	7	1	0	42	7
FW	(England) Walter Bussey	37	11	1	1	38	12
FW	(England) John Cull	8	1	0	0	8	1
FW	(England) Harry Davies	35	10	1	0	36	10
FW	(England) Jack Eyres	1	0	0	0	1	0
FW	(Scotland) Tommy Flannigan	4	0	0	0	4	0
FW	(England) Dick Johnson	5	2	0	0	5	2
FW	(England) Bobby Liddle	12	1	0	0	12	1
FW	(England) Joe Mawson	2	1	0	0	2	1
FW	(England) John Shirley	12	5	1	0	13	5
FW	(England) Charlie Wilson	31	22	0	0	31	22
FW	(England) Joey Williams	23	7	1	0	24	7
–	Own goals	–	1	–	0	–	1
