= Harry Davies (footballer, born 1876) =

English footballer

Personal information
- Full name: Henry James Davies
- Date of birth: 1876
- Place of birth: Tibberton, England
- Position: Full back

Senior career*
Years	Team	Apps	(Gls)
1897–1901	Wolverhampton Wanderers	66	(0)
1902–1904	Gainsborough Trinity	46	(3)
1904–1905	Doncaster Rovers	26	(1)
1905–1907	Hull City	34	(0)
1907–1908	Leicester Fosse	0	(0)
Total		172	(4)
- * Club domestic league appearances and goals

Henry James Davies (born 1876) was an English footballer who played in the Football League for Doncaster Rovers, Gainsborough Trinity, Hull City and Wolverhampton Wanderers. His son of the same name was also a footballer.
