= George Paterson (footballer, born 1904) =

Scottish footballer

Personal information
- Full name: George Birrell Gibb Paterson
- Date of birth: 29 June 1904
- Place of birth: Auchterderran, Scotland
- Date of death: 1949 (aged 44–45)
- Place of death: Lochgelly, Scotland
- Position: Centre forward

Youth career
- Kelty Rangers

Senior career*
Years	Team	Apps	(Gls)
1922–1923	Lochgelly United	9	(0)
1923–1924	Kelty Rangers		
1924–1925	Lochgelly United	24	(22)
1925–1926	Stoke City	7	(4)
1926	Lochgelly United		
1926–1929	East Fife	56	(20)
1928–1929	Rhyl Athletic		
1929–1934	Dunfermline Athletic	158	(71)
1934–1935	Leith Athletic	7	(1)
- * Club domestic league appearances and goals

George Birrell Gibb Paterson (29 June 1904 – 1949) was a Scottish footballer who played in the Football League for Stoke.

== Career ==
Born in Fife, Paterson played for local side Lochgelly United, then spent a year with junior club Kelty Rangers before returning to Lochgelly United, where he was a prolific goalscorer in his second spell (albeit in the third tier of the Scottish Football League), prompting English club Stoke City to sign him in 1925. He made an impressive start, scoring a hat-trick on his debut in a 4–0 win against Middlesbrough. After playing seven matches scoring four goals during the 1925–26 season, Paterson become seriously homesick and returned to Lochgelly, who had by then dropped out of the SFL into the Scottish Alliance.

He later went on to play for East Fife (featuring on the losing side in the 1927 Scottish Cup Final), spent a season with Rhyl Athletic, then had a productive five seasons at Dunfermline Athletic which culminated in a promotion as runners-up in 1933–34 Scottish Division Two. Rather than going up to the top level for what would have been the first time in his career, he signed for Leith Athletic, but was released after six months.

== Career statistics ==
Club	Season	League			FA Cup		Total	
Club	Season	Division	Apps	Goals	Apps	Goals	Apps	Goals
Stoke City	1925–26	Second Division	7	4	0	0	7	4
Career Total			7	4	0	0	7	4
