= John Walker (footballer, born 1899) =

English footballer

Personal information
- Full name: William John Walker
- Date of birth: 1899
- Place of birth: Great Wyrley, England
- Date of death: 1929 (aged 29–30)
- Position: Wing-half

Senior career*
Years	Team	Apps	(Gls)
1923–1924	Cannock Town		
1924–1926	Stoke	34	(1)
1926–1927	Walsall	12	(0)
Total		46	(1)
- * Club domestic league appearances and goals

William John Walker (1899–1929) was an English footballer who played in the Football League for Stoke and Walsall.

== Career ==
Walker was born in Great Wyrley and started playing football with Cannock Town before joining Stoke in 1924. He spent two seasons at the Victoria Ground both of which were poor seasons as Stoke were relegated to the third tier in 1925–26. Walker played 36 times for Stoke scoring once against Stockport County in January 1926. After Stoke's relegation Walker left the club for Walsall.

== Career statistics ==
Appearances and goals by club, season and competition
Club	Season	League			FA Cup		Total	
Club	Season	Division	Apps	Goals	Apps	Goals	Apps	Goals
Stoke	1924–25	Second Division	9	0	1	0	10	0
Stoke	1925–26	Second Division	25	1	1	0	26	1
Stoke	Total		34	1	2	0	36	1
Walsall	1926–27	Third Division North	12	0	0	0	12	0
Career total			46	1	2	0	48	1
