= Harold Robson =

English footballer

Personal information
- Full name: Harold Robson
- Date of birth: 1897
- Place of birth: Gateshead, England
- Position: Defender

Senior career*
Years	Team	Apps	(Gls)
- Usworth Colliery
1925–1926	Stoke City	1	(0)
1926	Southport	0	(0)
- * Club domestic league appearances and goals

Harold Robson (1897 – after 1926) was an English footballer who played in the Football League for Stoke City.

== Career ==
Robson was born in Gateshead and played amateur football with Usworth Colliery. In 1925, he joined Stoke City, making his sole appearance for the "Potters" in a 5–1 away defeat against Wolverhampton Wanderers on 20 February 1925. Following his inauspicious debut, he never played for the club again.

== Career statistics ==
Club	Season	League			FA Cup		Total	
Club	Season	Division	Apps	Goals	Apps	Goals	Apps	Goals
Stoke City	1925–26	Second Division	1	0	0	0	1	0
Career total			1	0	0	0	1	0
