= James Maxwell (footballer, born 1900) =

Scottish footballer (1900–1964)

James Fraser Maxwell
Personal information
- Full name: James Fraser Maxwell
- Date of birth: 26 June 1900
- Place of birth: Glasgow, Scotland
- Date of death: 1964 (aged 63–64)
- Position: Outside left

Senior career*
Years	Team	Apps	(Gls)
- Neliston Victoria
1924	Arbroath		
1925–1926	Stoke City	10	(0)
1926–1927	Watford	4	(1)
Total		14	(1)
- * Club domestic league appearances and goals

James Fraser Maxwell (26 June 1900 – 1964) was a Scottish footballer who played in the Football League for Stoke City and Watford.

== Career ==
Maxwell was born in Glasgow and played for Neliston Victoria and Arbroath before joining Stoke City in 1925. He played ten matches for Stoke in the 1925–26 season at Outside left and was released at the end of the season. He joined Watford where he played four times scoring once.

== Career statistics ==
Appearances and goals by club, season and competition
Club	Season	League			FA Cup		Total	
Club	Season	Division	Apps	Goals	Apps	Goals	Apps	Goals
Stoke City	1925–26	Second Division	10	0	0	0	10	0
Watford	1926–27	Third Division South	4	1	0	0	4	1
Career total			14	1	0	0	14	1
