= Bob Lister =

Scottish footballer

Personal information
- Full name: Robert Lister
- Date of birth: 1900
- Place of birth: Glasgow, Scotland
- Date of death: 1995 (aged 94–95)
- Height: 5 ft 6 in (1.68 m)
- Position: Outside left

Senior career*
| Years | Team | Apps | (Gls) |
| 1915 | Partick Thistle | | |
| 1919–1920 | Kirkintilloch Rob Roy | | |
| 1920–1923 | Heart of Midlothian | | |
| 1923–1924 | Queen of the South | | |
| 1924–1925 | Hamilton Academical | | |
| 1925–1926 | Queen of the South | | |
| 1926–1927 | Dunfermline Athletic | | |
| 1927–1928 | Stoke City | 1 | (0) |
| 1928–1930 | West Ham United | 0 | (0) |
| 1930–1931 | Exeter City | 8 | (1) |
| 1931 | Rhyl Athletic | | |
| 1932 | Shrewsbury Town | | |
- * Club domestic league appearances and goals

Robert Lister (1900 – 1995) was a Scottish footballer who played in the Football League for Exeter City and Stoke City.

== Career ==
Lister was born in Glasgow and played for joined Partick Thistle in 1915 moved onto Heart of Midlothian and Dunfermline Athletic before joining English side Stoke City in 1927. He played once for Stoke which came in a 5–1 victory against Fulham at Craven Cottage (12 November 1927). He then joined West Ham United where he failed to make an appearance and left for Exeter City where he played eight times scoring once. He later went on to play for Rhyl and Shrewsbury Town.

== Career statistics ==
Appearances and goals by club, season and competition
| Club | Season | League | | | FA Cup | | Total | |
| Club | Season | Division | Apps | Goals | Apps | Goals | Apps | Goals |
|---|---|---|---|---|---|---|---|---|
| Stoke City | 1927–28 | Second Division | 1 | 0 | 0 | 0 | 1 | 0 |
| Exeter City | 1930–31 | Third Division South | 8 | 1 | 0 | 0 | 8 | 1 |
| Career Total | | | 9 | 1 | 0 | 0 | 9 | 1 |
