= Len Armitage =

English footballer

Personal information
- Full name: Leonard Armitage
- Date of birth: 20 October 1899
- Place of birth: Sheffield, England
- Date of death: 24 June 1972 (aged 72)
- Place of death: Wortley, South Yorkshire, England
- Height: 5 ft 9 in (1.75 m)
- Positions: Defender; forward

Youth career
- Sheffield Forge & Rolling Mills
- Walkley Amateurs
- Wadsley Bridge
- 1914–1919: Sheffield Wednesday

Senior career*
Years	Team	Apps	(Gls)
1919–1920	Sheffield Wednesday	3	(0)
1920–1923	Leeds United	48	(11)
1923–1924	Wigan Borough	28	(21)
1924–1931	Stoke City	194	(19)
1932	Rhyl Athletic		
1932–1934	Port Vale	11	(2)
Total		284	(53)
- * Club domestic league appearances and goals

Leonard Armitage (20 October 1899 – 24 June 1972) was an English footballer who could play both in defence and attack. He made 284 league appearances in a 15-year career in the Football League.

In 1914, he signed with Sheffield Wednesday. He moved on to Leeds United in August 1920, before joining Wigan Borough in 1923, where he scored a remarkable 21 goals in 23 games. The following year he signed with Stoke City and remained with the club for seven seasons, helping the "Potters" to the Third Division North title in 1926–27. He had a brief spell with Rhyl Athletic before ending his career in 1934 following two years with Port Vale.

== Career ==
Armitage played for Sheffield Forge & Rolling Mills, Walkley Amateurs and Wadsley Bridge before joining Sheffield Wednesday as an amateur in October 1914 after winning English Schools Shield with Sheffield. He went on to sign professional forms with the club in August 1919 after serving as a soldier during World War I. He played three league games in his six years at Hillsborough. He signed with Leeds United in August 1920. He scored the club's first-ever goal in the Football League. He hit three goals in seven games in 1920–21, helping United to finish 14th in the Second Division. He scored eight goals in 32 games in 1921–22 as Leeds rose to eighth place. However, he featured 14 times in the 1922–23 campaign. He then left Elland Road for Wigan Borough in May 1923. He appeared 28 times for the Third Division North side and was the club's top scorer in the 1923–24 season with 21 goals.

He was transferred to Stoke in March 1924 in exchange for Andy Smith. Armitage was converted into a half-back. He played three Second Division games at the end of the 1923–24 season. He played 18 games in 1924–25, as the "Potters" avoided relegation after finishing just a single point ahead of Crystal Palace. He featured 14 times in 1925–26 as the club (now called Stoke City) was relegated after tallying three points fewer than the previous season. Injuries and illness restricted him to five goals in only three games in 1926–27, helping Stoke to win the Third Division North title at the first attempt. He managed to make 41 appearances in the 1927–28 season, as City finished in fifth place, just five points short of the promotion places. He played 40 games in 1928–29, as Stoke finished seven points short of promotion this time. He played for the "Professionals" in the 1929 FA Charity Shield. Stoke dropped to 11th in 1929–30, with Armitage playing 31 games. He featured 27 times in 1930–31, as City again finished 11th. He played four games in 1931–32, before losing his first-team place to Bill Robertson and leaving the Victoria Ground for a brief spell with Rhyl Athletic.

Armitage joined Port Vale in December 1932. He started with a first-team spot but soon lost it to the more youthful Jack Round, as Armitage struggled with a knee injury. He posted 11 appearances in 1932–33 but played just one Second Division game in 1933–34 before he left the Old Recreation Ground on a free transfer in May 1934.

== Style of play ==
Armitage was as "strong as a bull" and noted for his bravery and stamina.

== Personal life ==
His grandfather, Tom, was a cricketer who played for England in their inaugural Test match. His brother, also named Tom, died on New Year's Eve 1923 after being hit in the kidneys whilst playing for Sheffield Wednesday.

== Career statistics ==
Appearances and goals by club, season and competition
Club	Season	League			FA Cup		Total	
Club	Season	Division	Apps	Goals	Apps	Goals	Apps	Goals
Sheffield Wednesday	1919–20	First Division	3	0	0	0	3	0
Leeds United	1920–21	Second Division	6	1	1	2	7	3
Leeds United	1921–22	Second Division	31	8	1	0	32	8
Leeds United	1922–23	Second Division	11	2	3	1	14	3
Leeds United	Total		48	11	5	3	53	14
Wigan Borough	1923–24	Third Division North	28	21	3	1	31	22
Stoke City	1923–24	Second Division	3	0	0	0	3	0
Stoke City	1924–25	Second Division	17	2	1	0	18	2
Stoke City	1925–26	Second Division	14	0	0	0	14	0
Stoke City	1926–27	Third Division North	22	5	0	0	22	5
Stoke City	1927–28	Second Division	38	4	3	0	41	4
Stoke City	1928–29	Second Division	39	3	1	0	40	3
Stoke City	1929–30	Second Division	30	2	1	0	31	2
Stoke City	1930–31	Second Division	27	3	0	0	27	3
Stoke City	1931–32	Second Division	4	0	0	0	4	0
Stoke City	Total		194	19	6	0	200	19
Port Vale	1932–33	Second Division	10	2	1	0	11	2
Port Vale	1933–34	Second Division	1	0	1	0	2	0
Port Vale	Total		11	2	2	0	13	2
Career total			284	53	16	4	300	57

== Honours ==
Stoke City

- Football League Third Division North: 1926–27
