= Alex Campbell (footballer) =

Scottish footballer

Personal information
- Full name: Alexander Campbell
- Place of birth: Glasgow, Scotland
- Position: Defender

Senior career*
| Years | Team | Apps | (Gls) |
- Parkhead
- Albion Rovers
| 1926–1929 | Clapton Orient | 23 | (0) |
- Connah's Quay & Shotton
- * Club domestic league appearances and goals

Alex Campbell was a footballer who played in the English Football League for Clapton Orient. He was born in Glasgow, Scotland.
