= Bob Wallace (footballer, born 1893) =

Scottish footballer

Personal information
- Full name: Robert Stewart Wallace
- Date of birth: 20 January 1893
- Place of birth: Greenock, Scotland
- Date of death: 16 October 1970 (aged 77)
- Height: 5 ft 8 1/2 in (1.74 m)
- Position: Defender

Senior career*
Years	Team	Apps	(Gls)
- Linfield
1923–1930	Nottingham Forest	248	(2)
- Burton Town
- * Club domestic league appearances and goals

Robert Stewart Wallace (20 January 1893 – 16 October 1970) was a Scottish footballer who played in the English Football League for Nottingham Forest.
