= 1925–26 in English football =

Football in England
- Season: 1925–26

Men's football
- Football League: Huddersfield Town
- Football League Second Division: Wednesday
- FA Cup: Bolton Wanderers

The 1925–26 season was the 51st season of competitive football in England. This marked the year that Huddersfield Town won the League three years running, making them the first team in Football League history to do so.

== Honours ==
Competition	Winner	Runner-up
First Division	Huddersfield Town (3)	Arsenal
Second Division	The Wednesday	Derby County
Third Division North	Grimsby Town	Bradford Park Avenue
Third Division South	Reading	Plymouth Argyle
FA Cup	Bolton Wanderers (2)	Manchester City
Charity Shield	Amateurs XI	Professionals XI
Home Championship	Scotland	Ireland

== Football League ==
=== First Division ===
Pos	Team	Pld	W	D	L	GF	GA	GAv	Pts	Relegation
1	Huddersfield Town (C)	42	23	11	8	92	60	1.533	57	
2	Arsenal	42	22	8	12	87	63	1.381	52	
3	Sunderland	42	21	6	15	96	80	1.200	48	
4	Bury	42	20	7	15	85	77	1.104	47	
5	Sheffield United	42	19	8	15	102	82	1.244	46	
6	Aston Villa	42	16	12	14	86	76	1.132	44	
7	Liverpool	42	14	16	12	70	63	1.111	44	
8	Bolton Wanderers	42	17	10	15	75	76	0.987	44	
9	Manchester United	42	19	6	17	66	73	0.904	44	
10	Newcastle United	42	16	10	16	84	75	1.120	42	
11	Everton	42	12	18	12	72	70	1.029	42	
12	Blackburn Rovers	42	15	11	16	91	80	1.138	41	
13	West Bromwich Albion	42	16	8	18	79	78	1.013	40	
14	Birmingham	42	16	8	18	66	81	0.815	40	
15	Tottenham Hotspur	42	15	9	18	66	79	0.835	39	
16	Cardiff City	42	16	7	19	61	76	0.803	39	
17	Leicester City	42	14	10	18	70	80	0.875	38	
18	West Ham United	42	15	7	20	63	76	0.829	37	
19	Leeds United	42	14	8	20	64	76	0.842	36	
20	Burnley	42	13	10	19	85	108	0.787	36	
21	Manchester City (R)	42	12	11	19	89	100	0.890	35	Relegation to the Second Division
22	Notts County (R)	42	13	7	22	54	74	0.730	33	Relegation to the Second Division

Source: World Football
Rules for classification: 1) Points; 2) Goal average; 3) Goals scored
(C) Champions; (R) Relegated

=== Second Division ===
Pos	Team	Pld	W	D	L	GF	GA	GAv	Pts	Promotion or relegation
1	The Wednesday (C, P)	42	27	6	9	88	48	1.833	60	Promotion to the First Division
2	Derby County (P)	42	25	7	10	77	42	1.833	57	Promotion to the First Division
3	Chelsea	42	19	14	9	76	49	1.551	52	
4	Wolverhampton Wanderers	42	21	7	14	84	60	1.400	49	
5	Swansea Town	42	19	11	12	77	57	1.351	49	
6	Blackpool	42	17	11	14	76	69	1.101	45	
7	Oldham Athletic	42	18	8	16	74	62	1.194	44	
8	Port Vale	42	19	6	17	79	69	1.145	44	
9	South Shields	42	18	8	16	74	65	1.138	44	
10	Middlesbrough	42	21	2	19	77	68	1.132	44	
11	Portsmouth	42	17	10	15	79	74	1.068	44	
12	Preston North End	42	18	7	17	71	84	0.845	43	
13	Hull City	42	16	9	17	63	61	1.033	41	
14	Southampton	42	15	8	19	63	63	1.000	38	
15	Darlington	42	14	10	18	72	77	0.935	38	
16	Bradford City	42	13	10	19	47	66	0.712	36	
17	Nottingham Forest	42	14	8	20	51	73	0.699	36	
18	Barnsley	42	12	12	18	58	84	0.690	36	
19	Fulham	42	11	12	19	46	77	0.597	34	
20	Clapton Orient	42	12	9	21	50	65	0.769	33	
21	Stoke City (R)	42	12	8	22	54	77	0.701	32	Relegation to the Third Division North
22	Stockport County (R)	42	8	9	25	51	97	0.526	25	Relegation to the Third Division North

(C) Champions; (P) Promoted; (R) Relegated

=== Third Division North ===
Pos	Team	Pld	W	D	L	GF	GA	GAv	Pts	Promotion
1	Grimsby Town (C, P)	42	26	9	7	91	40	2.275	61	Promotion to the Second Division
2	Bradford (Park Avenue)	42	26	8	8	101	43	2.349	60	
3	Rochdale	42	27	5	10	104	58	1.793	59	
4	Chesterfield	42	25	5	12	100	54	1.852	55	
5	Halifax Town	42	17	11	14	53	50	1.060	45	
6	Hartlepools United	42	18	8	16	82	73	1.123	44	
7	Tranmere Rovers	42	19	6	17	73	83	0.880	44	
8	Nelson	42	16	11	15	89	71	1.254	43	
9	Ashington	42	16	11	15	70	62	1.129	43	
10	Doncaster Rovers	42	16	11	15	80	72	1.111	43	
11	Crewe Alexandra	42	17	9	16	63	61	1.033	43	
12	New Brighton	42	17	8	17	69	67	1.030	42	
13	Durham City	42	18	6	18	63	70	0.900	42	
14	Rotherham United	42	17	7	18	69	92	0.750	41	
15	Lincoln City	42	17	5	20	66	82	0.805	39	
16	Coventry City	42	16	6	20	73	82	0.890	38	Transferred to the Third Division South
17	Wigan Borough	42	13	11	18	68	74	0.919	37	
18	Accrington Stanley	42	17	3	22	81	105	0.771	37	
19	Wrexham	42	11	10	21	63	92	0.685	32	
20	Southport	42	11	10	21	62	92	0.674	32	
21	Walsall	42	10	6	26	58	107	0.542	26	Re-elected
22	Barrow	42	7	4	31	50	98	0.510	18	Re-elected

(C) Champions; (P) Promoted

=== Third Division South ===
Pos	Team	Pld	W	D	L	GF	GA	GAv	Pts	Promotion
1	Reading (C, P)	42	23	11	8	77	52	1.481	57	Promotion to the Second Division
2	Plymouth Argyle	42	24	8	10	107	67	1.597	56	
3	Millwall	42	21	11	10	73	39	1.872	53	
4	Bristol City	42	21	9	12	72	51	1.412	51	
5	Brighton & Hove Albion	42	19	9	14	84	73	1.151	47	
6	Swindon Town	42	20	6	16	69	64	1.078	46	
7	Luton Town	42	18	7	17	80	75	1.067	43	
8	Bournemouth & Boscombe Athletic	42	17	9	16	75	91	0.824	43	
9	Aberdare Athletic	42	17	8	17	74	66	1.121	42	
10	Gillingham	42	17	8	17	53	49	1.082	42	
11	Southend United	42	19	4	19	78	73	1.068	42	
12	Northampton Town	42	17	7	18	82	80	1.025	41	
13	Crystal Palace	42	19	3	20	75	79	0.949	41	
14	Merthyr Town	42	14	11	17	69	75	0.920	39	
15	Watford	42	15	9	18	73	89	0.820	39	
16	Norwich City	42	15	9	18	58	73	0.795	39	
17	Newport County	42	14	10	18	64	74	0.865	38	
18	Brentford	42	16	6	20	69	94	0.734	38	
19	Bristol Rovers	42	15	6	21	66	69	0.957	36	
20	Exeter City	42	15	5	22	72	70	1.029	35	
21	Charlton Athletic	42	11	13	18	48	68	0.706	35	Re-elected
22	Queens Park Rangers	42	6	9	27	37	84	0.440	21	Re-elected

(C) Champions; (P) Promoted

=== Top goalscorers ===
First Division

- Ted Harper (Blackburn Rovers) – 43 goals

Second Division

- Jimmy Trotter (The Wednesday) – 37 goals

Third Division North

- Jimmy Cookson (Chesterfield) – 44 goals

Third Division South

- Jack Cock (Plymouth Argyle) – 32 goals
