= Tom Mather =

English football manager (1888–1957)

Personal information
- Full name: Thomas Mather
- Date of birth: 1888
- Place of birth: Chorley, England
- Date of death: 1957 (aged 68–69)
- Place of death: Stoke-on-Trent, England

Managerial career
- Years: Team
- 1915–1919: Bolton Wanderers
- 1920–1921: Southend United
- 1923–1935: Stoke City
- 1935–1939: Newcastle United
- 1945–1946: Leicester City
- 1947–1948: Kilmarnock

Thomas Mather (1888–1957), was an English football manager who managed in the Football League for Bolton Wanderers, Leicester City, Newcastle United, Stoke City and Southend United.

== Career ==
Mather was assistant secretary of both Manchester City and Bolton Wanderers before taking the manager's job at Bolton at the beginning of the First World War, remaining at the club until 1915 when he was called up by the Royal Navy. He remained as manager, in name only, until July 1919, his duties being taken on, and then over, by his assistant Charles Foweraker. After his national service he moved to Southend United as secretary-manager. He spent three years at the "Shrimpers" before joining Stoke City in October 1923. Stoke had just been relegated from the First Division and had to get over the shock of seeing Jock Rutherford quit the club after just four weeks in charge. Mather's first season in charge saw Stoke finish in 6th position and he decided to move on a number of players at the end of the season. This did not go down well with some of the released players who smashed up the offices at the Victoria Ground and caused a considerable amount of damage.

Things did not improve quickly and Stoke suffered relegation to the Third Division North in 1925–26 season. But Mather spent his transfer budget well and Stoke gained an instant return to the second tier. The goals of Charlie Wilson proved invaluable as Stoke began to start pushing for a return to the First Division. Mather gave Stanley Matthews his debut in February 1932. After a number a failed attempts, Stoke finished as Second Division champions in 1932–33. Mather remained in charge of Stoke for two more seasons before Bob McGrory took over and Mather left in 1935 to join Newcastle United. Anecdotal evidence suggests that Mather attempted to encourage Matthews to join him at Newcastle, but Matthews declined.

He spent four years in charge of Newcastle United until the start of World War II. He spent a season in charge of Leicester City in 1945–46 and then a year at Scottish club Kilmarnock. He then returned to Stoke-on-Trent to work for a catering company.

== Career statistics ==
Managerial record by team and tenure
Team	From	To	Record				
Team	From	To	P	W	D	L	Win %
Bolton Wanderers	1 August 1915	31 May 1919	144	61	21	62	42.4
Southend United	August 1920	May 1921	45	16	8	21	35.6
Stoke City	October 1923	June 1935	523	222	122	179	42.4
Newcastle United	June 1935	September 1939	179	78	32	69	43.6
Leicester City	June 1945	June 1946	44	8	8	28	18.2
Kilmarnock	June 1946	June 1947	38	10	9	19	26.3
Total			973	395	200	378	40.6

== Honours ==
Stoke City

- Football League Second Division champion: 1932–33
- Football League Third Division North champion: 1926–27
