= 1932–33 in English football =

58th season of competitive football in England

Football in England
- Season: 1932–33

Men's football
- Football League: Arsenal
- Football League Second Division: Stoke
- FA Cup: Everton

The 1932–33 season was the 58th season of competitive football in England. For the second time in three seasons, Arsenal were crowned league champions, building on a start of just one defeat in the first fourteen games. They clinched the crown with a 3–1 win at Chelsea in April 1933. Meanwhile, Stoke City ended their nine-year wait for top flight promotion by attaining First Division status after winning an impressive 56 points over the campaign. Hull City and Brentford were also promoted. Everton won their second FA Cup defeating Manchester City 3–0 in the final. Lower league Walsall provided the surprise by knocking out Arsenal in an earlier round.

== Events ==
5 November 1932 - Gillespie Road station on the London Underground - the station local to Arsenal Stadium - is renamed to Arsenal (Highbury Hill), on the suggestion of Arsenal manager Herbert Chapman. By 1960, the station would become Arsenal tube station. It is the only Tube station named directly after a football club. (Note: Several tube stations, including West Ham and Wimbledon, share their names with football clubs, but only Arsenal was named directly after a club rather than the associated area.)

== Honours ==
Competition	Winner	Runner-up
First Division	Arsenal (2)	Aston Villa
Second Division	Stoke City	Tottenham Hotspur
Third Division North	Hull City	Wrexham
Third Division South	Brentford	Exeter City
FA Cup	Everton (2)	Manchester City
Charity Shield	Everton	Newcastle United
Home Championship	Wales	Scotland

Notes = Number in parentheses is the times that club has won that honour. * indicates new record for competition

== Football League ==
=== First Division ===
Pos	Team	Pld	W	D	L	GF	GA	GAv	Pts	Relegation
1	Arsenal (C)	42	25	8	9	118	61	1.934	58	
2	Aston Villa	42	23	8	11	92	67	1.373	54	
3	Sheffield Wednesday	42	21	9	12	80	68	1.176	51	
4	West Bromwich Albion	42	20	9	13	83	70	1.186	49	
5	Newcastle United	42	22	5	15	71	63	1.127	49	
6	Huddersfield Town	42	18	11	13	66	53	1.245	47	
7	Derby County	42	15	14	13	76	69	1.101	44	
8	Leeds United	42	15	14	13	59	62	0.952	44	
9	Portsmouth	42	18	7	17	74	76	0.974	43	
10	Sheffield United	42	17	9	16	74	80	0.925	43	
11	Everton	42	16	9	17	81	74	1.095	41	
12	Sunderland	42	15	10	17	63	80	0.788	40	
13	Birmingham	42	14	11	17	57	57	1.000	39	
14	Liverpool	42	14	11	17	79	84	0.940	39	
15	Blackburn Rovers	42	14	10	18	76	102	0.745	38	
16	Manchester City	42	16	5	21	68	71	0.958	37	
17	Middlesbrough	42	14	9	19	63	73	0.863	37	
18	Chelsea	42	14	7	21	63	73	0.863	35	
19	Leicester City	42	11	13	18	75	89	0.843	35	
20	Wolverhampton Wanderers	42	13	9	20	80	96	0.833	35	
21	Bolton Wanderers (R)	42	12	9	21	78	92	0.848	33	Relegation to the Second Division
22	Blackpool (R)	42	14	5	23	69	85	0.812	33	Relegation to the Second Division

Source: World Football
Rules for classification: 1) Points; 2) Goal average; 3) Goals scored
(C) Champions; (R) Relegated

=== Second Division ===
Pos	Team	Pld	W	D	L	GF	GA	GAv	Pts	Promotion or relegation
1	Stoke City (C, P)	42	25	6	11	78	39	2.000	56	Promotion to the First Division
2	Tottenham Hotspur (P)	42	20	15	7	96	51	1.882	55	Promotion to the First Division
3	Fulham	42	20	10	12	78	65	1.200	50	
4	Bury	42	20	9	13	84	59	1.424	49	
5	Nottingham Forest	42	17	15	10	67	59	1.136	49	
6	Manchester United	42	15	13	14	71	68	1.044	43	
7	Millwall	42	16	11	15	59	57	1.035	43	
8	Bradford (Park Avenue)	42	17	8	17	77	71	1.085	42	
9	Preston North End	42	16	10	16	74	70	1.057	42	
10	Swansea Town	42	19	4	19	50	54	0.926	42	
11	Bradford City	42	14	13	15	65	61	1.066	41	
12	Southampton	42	18	5	19	66	66	1.000	41	
13	Grimsby Town	42	14	13	15	79	84	0.940	41	
14	Plymouth Argyle	42	16	9	17	63	67	0.940	41	
15	Notts County	42	15	10	17	67	78	0.859	40	
16	Oldham Athletic	42	15	8	19	67	80	0.838	38	
17	Port Vale	42	14	10	18	66	79	0.835	38	
18	Lincoln City	42	12	13	17	72	87	0.828	37	
19	Burnley	42	11	14	17	67	79	0.848	36	
20	West Ham United	42	13	9	20	75	93	0.806	35	
21	Chesterfield (R)	42	12	10	20	61	84	0.726	34	Relegation to the Third Division North
22	Charlton Athletic (R)	42	12	7	23	60	91	0.659	31	Relegation to the Third Division South

Rules for classification: 1) Points; 2) Goal average; 3) Goals scored
(C) Champions; (P) Promoted; (R) Relegated

=== Third Division North ===
Pos	Team	Pld	W	D	L	GF	GA	GAv	Pts	Promotion
1	Hull City (C, P)	42	26	7	9	100	45	2.222	59	Promotion to the Second Division
2	Wrexham	42	24	9	9	106	51	2.078	57	
3	Stockport County	42	21	12	9	99	58	1.707	54	
4	Chester	42	22	8	12	94	66	1.424	52	
5	Walsall	42	19	10	13	75	58	1.293	48	
6	Doncaster Rovers	42	17	14	11	77	79	0.975	48	
7	Gateshead	42	19	9	14	78	67	1.164	47	
8	Barnsley	42	19	8	15	92	80	1.150	46	
9	Barrow	42	18	7	17	60	60	1.000	43	
10	Crewe Alexandra	42	20	3	19	80	84	0.952	43	
11	Tranmere Rovers	42	17	8	17	70	66	1.061	42	
12	Southport	42	17	7	18	70	67	1.045	41	
13	Accrington Stanley	42	15	10	17	78	76	1.026	40	
14	Hartlepools United	42	16	7	19	87	116	0.750	39	
15	Halifax Town	42	15	8	19	71	90	0.789	38	
16	Mansfield Town	42	14	7	21	84	100	0.840	35	
17	Rotherham United	42	14	6	22	60	84	0.714	34	
18	Rochdale	42	13	7	22	58	80	0.725	33	
19	Carlisle United	42	13	7	22	51	75	0.680	33	
20	York City	42	13	6	23	72	92	0.783	32	
21	New Brighton	42	11	10	21	63	88	0.716	32	Re-elected
22	Darlington	42	10	8	24	66	109	0.606	28	Re-elected

Source: rsssf.com
(C) Champions; (P) Promoted

=== Third Division South ===
Pos	Team	Pld	W	D	L	GF	GA	GAv	Pts	Promotion
1	Brentford (C, P)	42	26	10	6	90	49	1.837	62	Promotion to the Second Division
2	Exeter City	42	24	10	8	88	48	1.833	58	
3	Norwich City	42	22	13	7	88	55	1.600	57	
4	Reading	42	19	13	10	103	71	1.451	51	
5	Crystal Palace	42	19	8	15	78	64	1.219	46	
6	Coventry City	42	19	6	17	106	77	1.377	44	
7	Gillingham	42	18	8	16	72	61	1.180	44	
8	Northampton Town	42	18	8	16	76	66	1.152	44	
9	Bristol Rovers	42	15	14	13	61	56	1.089	44	
10	Torquay United	42	16	12	14	72	67	1.075	44	
11	Watford	42	16	12	14	66	63	1.048	44	
12	Brighton & Hove Albion	42	17	8	17	66	65	1.015	42	
13	Southend United	42	15	11	16	65	82	0.793	41	
14	Luton Town	42	13	13	16	78	78	1.000	39	
15	Bristol City	42	12	13	17	83	90	0.922	37	
16	Queens Park Rangers	42	13	11	18	72	87	0.828	37	
17	Aldershot	42	13	10	19	61	72	0.847	36	
18	Bournemouth & Boscombe Athletic	42	12	12	18	60	81	0.741	36	
19	Cardiff City	42	12	7	23	69	99	0.697	31	
20	Clapton Orient	42	8	13	21	59	93	0.634	29	
21	Newport County	42	11	7	24	61	105	0.581	29	Re-elected
22	Swindon Town	42	9	11	22	60	105	0.571	29	Re-elected

(C) Champions; (P) Promoted

=== Top goalscorers ===
First Division

- Jack Bowers (Derby County) – 35 goals

Second Division

- Ted Harper (Preston North End) – 37 goals

Third Division North

- Bill McNaughton (Hull City) – 39 goals

Third Division South

- Clarrie Bourton (Coventry City) – 40 goals
