= 1926–27 Football League =

35th season of the Football League

The Football League
- Season: 1926–27
- Champions: Newcastle United
- Relegated: Aberdare Athletic

The 1926–27 season was the 35th season of The Football League.

== Final league tables ==
The tables and results below are reproduced here in the exact form that they can be found at The Rec.Sport.Soccer Statistics Foundation website and in Rothmans Book of Football League Records 1888–89 to 1978–79, with home and away statistics separated.

Beginning with the season 1894–95, clubs finishing level on points were separated according to goal average (goals scored divided by goals conceded), or more properly put, goal ratio. In case one or more teams had the same goal difference, this system favoured those teams who had scored fewer goals. The goal average system was eventually scrapped beginning with the 1976–77 season. From the 1922–23 season on Re-election was required of the bottom two teams of both Third Division North and Third Division South.

== First Division ==
First Division
- Season: 1926–27
- Champions: Newcastle United; 4th title
- Relegated: Leeds United; West Bromwich Albion
- Matches: 462
- Goals: 1,668 (3.61 per match)
- Top goalscorer: Jimmy Trotter (37 goals)
- Biggest home win: Derby County 8–0 The Wednesday (19 March 1927)
- Biggest away win: West Ham United 1–5 Blackburn Rovers (11 September 1926); Blackburn Rovers 1–5 Burnley (16 October 1926); Tottenham Hotspur 0–4 Arsenal (7 March 1927); Aston Villa 1–5 West Ham United (2 April 1927)
- Highest scoring: Bury 7–3 West Bromwich Albion (11 September 1926); Newcastle United 7–3 Everton (5 March 1927)

Pos	Team	Pld	W	D	L	GF	GA	GAv	Pts	Relegation
1	Newcastle United (C)	42	25	6	11	96	58	1.655	56	
2	Huddersfield Town	42	17	17	8	76	60	1.267	51	
3	Sunderland	42	21	7	14	98	70	1.400	49	
4	Bolton Wanderers	42	19	10	13	84	62	1.355	48	
5	Burnley	42	19	9	14	91	80	1.138	47	
6	West Ham United	42	19	8	15	86	70	1.229	46	
7	Leicester City	42	17	12	13	85	70	1.214	46	
8	Sheffield United	42	17	10	15	74	86	0.860	44	
9	Liverpool	42	18	7	17	69	61	1.131	43	
10	Aston Villa	42	18	7	17	81	83	0.976	43	
11	Arsenal	42	17	9	16	77	86	0.895	43	
12	Derby County	42	17	7	18	86	73	1.178	41	
13	Tottenham Hotspur	42	16	9	17	76	78	0.974	41	
14	Cardiff City	42	16	9	17	55	65	0.846	41	
15	Manchester United	42	13	14	15	52	64	0.813	40	
16	The Wednesday	42	15	9	18	75	92	0.815	39	
17	Birmingham	42	17	4	21	64	73	0.877	38	
18	Blackburn Rovers	42	15	8	19	77	96	0.802	38	
19	Bury	42	12	12	18	68	77	0.883	36	
20	Everton	42	12	10	20	64	90	0.711	34	
21	Leeds United (R)	42	11	8	23	69	88	0.784	30	Relegation to the Second Division
22	West Bromwich Albion (R)	42	11	8	23	65	86	0.756	30	Relegation to the Second Division

Source: World Football
Rules for classification: 1) Points; 2) Goal average; 3) Goals scored
(C) Champions; (R) Relegated

=== Results ===
Home \ Away	ARS	AST	BIR	BLB	BOL	BUR	BRY	CAR	DER	EVE	HUD	LEE	LEI	LIV	MUN	NEW	SHU	SUN	TOT	WED	WBA	WHU
Arsenal		2–1	3–0	2–2	2–1	6–2	1–0	3–2	2–1	1–2	0–2	1–0	2–2	2–0	1–0	2–2	1–1	2–3	2–4	6–2	4–1	8–2
Aston Villa	2–3		4–2	4–3	3–4	1–1	1–2	0–0	3–1	5–3	3–0	5–1	2–0	1–1	2–0	1–2	4–0	3–1	2–3	2–2	2–0	1–5
Birmingham	0–0	1–2		3–1	6–1	1–0	2–2	1–2	1–0	1–0	1–3	2–0	2–1	3–0	4–0	2–0	2–3	2–0	1–0	0–0	1–0	0–2
Blackburn Rovers	1–2	0–2	3–2		0–3	1–5	2–2	1–0	4–4	3–3	4–2	4–1	2–1	2–1	2–1	1–2	3–4	0–2	1–0	2–2	0–0	4–1
Bolton Wanderers	2–2	0–2	1–0	5–1		3–1	2–2	2–0	3–1	5–0	4–0	3–0	2–0	2–1	4–0	2–1	4–1	2–2	2–2	3–2	1–1	2–0
Burnley	2–0	6–3	0–2	3–1	4–3		0–0	4–3	1–0	5–1	2–2	3–2	1–1	4–0	1–0	3–3	2–5	4–2	5–0	1–0	2–1	2–1
Bury	3–2	0–1	3–1	0–2	2–0	3–3		2–3	1–2	5–2	2–2	4–2	0–0	0–2	0–3	3–2	4–4	1–2	0–0	2–0	7–3	1–2
Cardiff City	2–0	2–3	1–0	0–1	1–0	0–0	2–1		2–0	1–0	2–0	3–1	0–1	2–0	0–2	1–1	3–0	3–0	1–2	3–2	1–1	1–2
Derby County	0–2	2–3	4–1	4–5	2–0	4–1	2–0	6–3		0–0	4–4	1–0	4–1	2–1	2–2	1–1	1–0	4–2	4–1	8–0	2–1	3–0
Everton	3–1	2–2	3–1	1–0	1–1	3–2	2–2	0–1	3–2		0–0	2–1	3–4	1–0	0–0	1–3	2–0	5–4	1–2	2–1	0–0	0–3
Huddersfield Town	3–3	0–0	0–2	5–0	1–0	2–0	3–1	0–0	4–2	0–0		4–1	5–3	1–0	0–0	1–0	0–2	0–0	2–0	4–3	4–1	2–1
Leeds United	4–1	3–1	2–1	4–1	2–5	0–2	4–1	0–0	1–0	1–3	1–1		1–1	0–0	2–3	1–2	1–1	2–2	1–1	4–1	3–1	6–3
Leicester City	2–1	5–1	5–2	4–0	0–1	0–3	1–1	3–1	1–1	6–2	2–4	3–2		3–2	2–3	2–1	2–2	2–1	2–2	5–3	5–0	3–0
Liverpool	3–0	2–1	2–1	2–2	3–2	2–2	2–2	5–0	3–2	1–0	2–3	2–4	1–0		4–2	1–2	5–1	1–2	1–0	3–0	2–1	0–0
Manchester United	2–2	2–1	0–1	2–0	0–0	2–1	1–2	1–1	2–2	2–1	0–0	2–2	1–0	0–1		3–1	5–0	0–0	2–1	0–0	2–0	0–3
Newcastle United	6–1	4–0	5–1	6–1	1–0	1–5	3–1	5–0	3–0	7–3	1–0	1–0	1–1	1–0	4–2		2–0	1–0	3–2	2–1	5–2	2–0
Sheffield United	4–0	3–1	4–3	5–3	1–1	2–2	2–0	3–1	1–0	3–3	3–3	1–0	0–3	1–4	2–2	2–1		2–0	3–3	2–0	2–1	0–2
Sunderland	5–1	1–1	4–1	2–5	6–2	7–1	3–0	2–2	1–2	3–2	1–1	6–2	3–0	2–1	6–0	2–0	3–0		3–2	4–1	4–1	2–3
Tottenham Hotspur	0–4	0–1	6–1	1–1	1–0	4–1	1–0	4–1	3–2	2–1	3–3	4–1	2–2	1–2	1–1	1–3	3–1	0–2		7–3	3–0	1–3
The Wednesday	4–2	3–1	4–4	0–3	2–1	2–1	1–3	3–0	2–1	4–0	1–1	1–0	2–2	3–2	2–0	3–2	2–3	4–1	3–1		2–1	1–0
West Bromwich Albion	1–3	6–2	1–2	2–0	1–1	4–2	3–1	1–2	3–1	3–2	2–2	2–4	0–1	0–1	2–2	4–2	1–0	3–0	5–0	2–2		1–3
West Ham United	7–0	5–1	1–0	1–5	4–4	2–1	1–2	2–2	1–2	2–1	3–2	3–2	3–3	3–3	4–0	1–1	3–0	1–2	1–2	1–1	1–2	

Updated to match(es) played on unknown. Source:
Legend: Blue = home team win; Yellow = draw; Red = away team win.

=== Maps ===
Locations of the Football League First Division London teams
Locations of the Football League First Division teams

== Second Division ==
Football League Second Division
- Season: 1926–27
- Champions: Middlesbrough (1st title)
- Relegated: Bradford City; Darlington
- Matches: 462
- Goals: 1,668 (3.61 per match)
- Top goalscorer: George Camsell (Middlesbrough), 59
- Biggest home win: Portsmouth – Notts County 9–1 (9 Apr 1927); Manchester City – Bradford City 8–0 (7 Mar 1927)
- Biggest away win: Fulham – Grimsby Town 0–4 (16 Feb 1927)
- Highest scoring: Grimsby Town – Middlesbrough 4–7 (8 Feb 1927)

Pos	Team	Pld	W	D	L	GF	GA	GAv	Pts	Promotion or relegation
1	Middlesbrough (C, P)	42	27	8	7	122	60	2.033	62	Promotion to the First Division
2	Portsmouth (P)	42	23	8	11	87	49	1.776	54	Promotion to the First Division
3	Manchester City	42	22	10	10	108	61	1.770	54	
4	Chelsea	42	20	12	10	62	52	1.192	52	
5	Nottingham Forest	42	18	14	10	80	55	1.455	50	
6	Preston North End	42	20	9	13	74	72	1.028	49	
7	Hull City	42	20	7	15	63	52	1.212	47	
8	Port Vale	42	16	13	13	88	78	1.128	45	
9	Blackpool	42	18	8	16	95	80	1.188	44	
10	Oldham Athletic	42	19	6	17	74	84	0.881	44	
11	Barnsley	42	17	9	16	88	87	1.011	43	
12	Swansea Town	42	16	11	15	68	72	0.944	43	
13	Southampton	42	15	12	15	60	62	0.968	42	
14	Reading	42	16	8	18	64	72	0.889	40	
15	Wolverhampton Wanderers	42	14	7	21	73	75	0.973	35	
16	Notts County	42	15	5	22	70	96	0.729	35	
17	Grimsby Town	42	11	12	19	74	91	0.813	34	
18	Fulham	42	13	8	21	58	92	0.630	34	
19	South Shields	42	11	11	20	71	96	0.740	33	
20	Clapton Orient	42	12	7	23	60	96	0.625	31	
21	Darlington (R)	42	12	6	24	79	98	0.806	30	Relegation to the Third Division North
22	Bradford City (R)	42	7	9	26	50	88	0.568	23	Relegation to the Third Division North

(C) Champions; (P) Promoted; (R) Relegated

=== Results ===
Home \ Away	BAR	BLP	BRA	CHE	CLA	DAR	FUL	GRI	HUL	MCI	MID	NOT	NTC	OLD	POR	PTV	PNE	REA	SOU	SSH	SWA	WOL
Barnsley		6–1	1–0	3–0	4–2	3–2	5–0	2–1	1–2	1–1	1–1	0–2	4–4	0–1	2–0	2–0	3–0	2–2	5–1	6–1	1–1	4–1
Blackpool	6–1		3–0	3–1	6–0	1–1	0–0	6–2	4–0	2–4	2–2	2–2	5–0	2–0	2–0	2–2	2–3	3–1	3–2	6–1	3–1	2–3
Bradford City	1–1	4–1		0–1	1–3	0–1	1–0	2–2	1–2	4–3	0–1	1–1	1–2	0–1	1–2	1–2	0–1	1–1	2–0	3–1	5–0	1–2
Chelsea	4–2	1–1	5–2		2–1	2–2	2–2	2–0	1–0	0–0	3–0	2–0	2–0	1–0	0–0	2–0	2–1	0–0	2–3	4–1	2–2	1–0
Clapton Orient	0–1	1–0	1–1	3–0		0–4	2–3	2–4	1–2	2–4	2–3	2–2	2–1	3–1	4–5	1–2	1–1	5–1	1–0	1–0	1–0	2–0
Darlington	3–3	1–3	3–0	2–2	2–1		5–0	2–3	1–3	2–2	1–4	4–2	4–2	0–1	0–4	4–3	0–1	4–2	1–2	8–2	3–1	3–1
Fulham	1–0	1–0	1–1	1–2	2–0	2–1		0–5	3–1	2–5	0–3	2–1	3–0	1–1	0–0	6–2	0–1	1–2	3–0	2–2	4–3	4–1
Grimsby Town	1–3	2–1	4–2	0–0	2–2	2–1	2–0		0–1	2–2	4–7	1–1	1–4	2–5	0–0	4–4	5–2	0–1	0–1	1–1	0–1	6–0
Hull City	5–1	3–0	4–0	0–1	4–0	2–1	2–0	2–3		3–2	3–3	1–2	2–0	1–2	2–1	0–0	3–1	1–1	0–0	2–0	2–1	1–0
Manchester City	1–1	2–1	8–0	1–0	6–1	7–0	4–2	2–0	2–2		3–5	1–1	4–1	3–0	4–0	4–1	1–0	3–0	3–4	1–2	3–1	2–1
Middlesbrough	5–1	4–4	4–3	0–0	6–0	4–1	6–1	3–0	2–0	2–1		1–0	4–2	3–1	7–3	5–2	0–2	5–0	3–1	5–0	7–1	2–0
Nottingham Forest	3–1	2–0	3–0	4–1	1–1	5–1	2–0	1–1	3–1	3–3	4–3		2–0	1–1	1–0	0–3	7–0	5–1	3–1	4–2	2–2	1–1
Notts County	1–1	2–3	4–0	5–0	3–1	3–1	4–0	3–0	1–0	1–0	2–2	1–2		1–2	2–3	2–1	1–1	2–0	0–1	4–1	1–3	2–2
Oldham Athletic	0–4	1–3	2–1	1–2	5–2	3–2	2–3	3–1	1–1	1–2	2–1	3–3	5–2		1–0	1–3	5–1	3–1	1–1	3–2	5–2	2–0
Portsmouth	1–2	5–0	1–0	2–3	1–1	0–0	2–0	5–2	2–0	2–1	0–1	0–0	9–1	7–2		4–0	5–1	5–0	3–1	1–1	1–0	2–1
Port Vale	3–2	2–4	0–0	0–0	3–0	3–2	7–1	6–1	0–0	0–2	3–1	0–2	6–2	3–0	2–3		2–0	1–1	3–1	4–2	1–1	1–1
Preston North End	2–1	4–1	3–2	0–2	2–2	4–1	2–2	3–2	1–0	2–4	2–2	1–0	4–1	5–2	1–2	4–4		3–1	1–0	4–0	4–0	2–0
Reading	3–2	0–1	2–3	2–1	0–1	4–2	2–0	1–1	0–1	1–0	2–1	4–0	7–1	6–1	1–2	2–0	3–0		1–0	2–1	3–0	1–2
Southampton	3–1	5–3	0–0	1–1	1–2	3–1	4–1	0–0	0–1	1–1	2–1	1–0	2–0	0–1	0–2	2–2	1–1	1–1		6–2	1–1	1–0
South Shields	7–1	2–2	3–3	5–1	2–1	1–0	1–1	3–2	3–1	2–2	0–0	1–0	5–0	4–1	1–0	3–3	1–1	3–0	1–2		0–1	1–2
Swansea Town	5–2	2–0	1–0	2–1	3–2	5–1	4–2	1–1	1–0	1–3	0–1	2–1	0–1	3–0	1–1	2–2	0–0	3–0	2–2	2–0		4–1
Wolverhampton Wanderers	9–1	4–1	7–2	0–3	5–0	2–1	2–1	3–4	5–2	4–1	1–2	2–0	0–1	1–1	0–1	1–2	1–2	1–1	2–2	2–0	2–2	

Updated to match(es) played on unknown. Source: Ian Laschke: Rothmans Book of Football League Records 1888–89 to 1978–79. Macdonald and Jane’s, London & Sydney, 1980.
Legend: Blue = home team win; Yellow = draw; Red = away team win.

=== Maps ===
Locations of the Football League Second Division London teams
Locations of the Football League Second Division teams

== Third Division North ==
Football League Third Division North
- Season: 1926–27
- Champions: Stoke City (1st title)
- Failed re-election: None
- Matches: 462
- Goals: 1,692 (3.66 per match)
- Top goalscorer: Albert Whitehurst (Rochdale), 44

Pos	Team	Pld	W	D	L	GF	GA	GAv	Pts	Promotion
1	Stoke City (C, P)	42	27	9	6	92	40	2.300	63	Promotion to the Second Division
2	Rochdale	42	26	6	10	105	65	1.615	58	
3	Bradford (Park Avenue)	42	24	7	11	101	59	1.712	55	
4	Halifax Town	42	21	11	10	70	53	1.321	53	
5	Nelson	42	22	7	13	104	75	1.387	51	
6	Stockport County	42	22	7	13	93	69	1.348	49 (Note: Stockport County had two points deducted for fielding Joe Smith without FA permission on 26 March 1927.)	
7	Chesterfield	42	21	5	16	92	68	1.353	47	
8	Doncaster Rovers	42	18	11	13	81	65	1.246	47	
9	Tranmere Rovers	42	19	8	15	85	67	1.269	46	
10	New Brighton	42	18	10	14	79	67	1.179	46	
11	Lincoln City	42	15	12	15	90	78	1.154	42	
12	Southport	42	15	9	18	80	85	0.941	39	
13	Wrexham	42	14	10	18	65	73	0.890	38	
14	Walsall	42	14	10	18	68	81	0.840	38	Transferred to the Third Division South
15	Crewe Alexandra	42	14	9	19	71	81	0.877	37	
16	Ashington	42	12	12	18	60	90	0.667	36	
17	Hartlepools United	42	14	6	22	66	81	0.815	34	
18	Wigan Borough	42	11	10	21	66	83	0.795	32	
19	Rotherham United	42	10	12	20	70	92	0.761	32	
20	Durham City	42	12	6	24	58	105	0.552	30	
21	Accrington Stanley	42	10	7	25	62	98	0.633	27	Re-elected
22	Barrow	42	7	8	27	34	117	0.291	22	Re-elected

Source: rsssf.com
(C) Champions; (P) Promoted

=== Results ===
Home \ Away	ACC	ASH	BRW	BPA	CHF	CRE	DON	DUR	HAL	HAR	LIN	NEL	NWB	ROC	ROT	SOU	STP	STK	TRA	WAL	WIG	WRE
Accrington Stanley		3–0	0–1	2–3	2–1	3–1	2–0	3–0	4–2	7–2	1–1	0–5	2–3	0–1	3–1	2–2	2–4	0–1	2–3	3–5	3–1	1–1
Ashington	2–1		3–0	2–2	2–1	4–1	1–1	3–1	3–0	1–0	1–2	1–1	2–3	2–2	4–4	4–1	1–1	0–2	4–3	0–2	1–1	1–1
Barrow	1–1	2–2		0–3	1–0	3–1	0–1	2–1	1–1	1–3	0–3	0–1	0–3	2–3	2–2	1–4	1–3	0–0	2–1	1–0	2–2	0–5
Bradford Park Avenue	6–1	2–0	1–0		5–0	2–0	7–3	3–0	2–1	4–1	3–1	2–2	1–1	5–1	2–2	6–2	3–1	3–0	5–3	5–1	2–1	5–0
Chesterfield	1–1	4–1	8–1	3–2		3–0	1–1	7–1	2–0	1–0	4–2	1–1	3–4	2–3	5–2	5–1	3–0	1–1	3–1	2–0	5–2	1–3
Crewe Alexandra	4–0	2–1	5–0	1–1	0–0		1–3	2–1	1–2	0–1	3–3	2–1	3–2	4–0	2–2	1–0	3–2	0–2	4–1	1–1	2–4	5–1
Doncaster Rovers	2–0	3–1	7–0	4–1	0–3	0–2		5–1	2–0	2–0	1–3	6–0	2–2	3–2	2–2	3–1	1–2	3–1	4–1	2–2	4–1	2–2
Durham City	2–0	0–2	1–1	2–1	2–1	1–2	2–2		0–1	2–1	4–2	3–3	2–2	1–3	0–1	4–2	1–5	1–2	0–3	3–0	3–1	1–0
Halifax Town	4–3	1–1	5–1	2–0	3–1	3–1	2–1	1–2		2–1	2–1	4–1	2–2	1–0	4–2	1–1	4–1	2–2	2–0	1–1	0–0	0–1
Hartlepool	3–1	0–1	1–1	2–4	1–2	1–1	3–0	4–0	0–1		1–1	3–2	4–0	3–2	3–1	2–0	1–2	1–3	2–1	2–2	2–1	4–0
Lincoln City	4–0	4–0	3–1	5–1	3–1	3–3	0–0	5–0	3–1	1–2		1–4	4–1	2–3	1–2	1–1	1–3	1–3	1–2	3–3	2–0	2–2
Nelson	7–0	4–0	3–0	1–0	0–3	7–1	5–1	1–1	0–0	6–2	2–1		2–0	3–1	5–3	1–2	6–1	1–0	0–2	3–2	4–0	3–0
New Brighton	0–1	4–0	3–1	3–1	1–0	3–0	0–2	3–1	0–3	2–1	1–1	7–2		1–2	3–0	4–1	1–2	5–0	0–0	3–1	3–1	2–1
Rochdale	2–1	5–0	5–1	3–0	8–1	3–1	7–2	1–3	2–0	3–0	7–3	2–1	1–1		2–1	1–0	2–0	4–0	3–1	4–4	4–1	3–1
Rotherham United	1–1	5–0	2–0	1–1	0–4	2–1	1–3	3–1	2–4	5–3	2–4	2–3	0–0	1–1		1–2	1–2	2–2	2–2	4–1	2–0	2–0
Southport	2–1	4–1	3–0	2–1	2–1	2–2	2–0	4–5	0–0	1–0	2–3	3–4	7–2	1–1	2–0		2–2	0–3	1–3	6–1	2–2	6–0
Stockport County	3–3	6–2	7–0	1–2	4–0	3–1	1–0	4–0	1–3	3–3	3–3	4–1	1–0	3–0	3–1	2–4		2–2	2–1	0–2	4–1	3–2
Stoke	1–0	7–0	4–0	0–0	3–2	2–1	0–0	4–0	5–1	3–1	2–0	4–1	1–1	3–1	4–1	4–0	0–1		2–0	4–1	2–0	2–0
Tranmere	2–1	2–1	7–2	1–2	3–2	1–0	1–1	8–3	0–0	2–0	1–1	2–3	4–1	0–1	4–0	3–0	0–0	1–1		6–0	3–1	3–2
Walsall	5–1	0–0	1–0	1–0	0–1	2–3	1–0	1–1	0–1	2–2	1–2	4–1	0–1	4–1	3–2	1–1	1–0	0–1	5–1		3–2	0–1
Wigan Borough	3–0	1–4	8–0	1–2	1–2	2–2	1–1	3–0	1–1	3–0	3–2	2–1	3–2	0–3	0–0	3–1	2–0	0–3	1–1	5–2		1–1
Wrexham	5–0	1–1	0–2	1–0	3–1	3–1	0–1	3–1	1–2	4–0	1–1	2–2	2–2	2–2	3–0	3–0	2–1	2–6	0–1	1–2	2–0	

Updated to match(es) played on unknown. Source: Ian Laschke: Rothmans Book of Football League Records 1888–89 to 1978–79. Macdonald and Jane’s, London & Sydney, 1980.
Legend: Blue = home team win; Yellow = draw; Red = away team win.

=== Maps ===
Locations of the Football League Third Division North teams

== Third Division South ==
Football League Third Division South
- Season: 1926–27
- Champions: Bristol City (2nd title)
- Failed re-election: Aberdare Athletic
- Matches: 462
- Goals: 1,592 (3.45 per match)
- Top goalscorer: Harry Morris (Swindon Town), 47

Pos	Team	Pld	W	D	L	GF	GA	GAv	Pts	Promotion or relegation
1	Bristol City (C, P)	42	27	8	7	104	54	1.926	62	Promotion to the Second Division
2	Plymouth Argyle	42	25	10	7	95	61	1.557	60	
3	Millwall	42	23	10	9	89	51	1.745	56	
4	Brighton & Hove Albion	42	21	11	10	79	50	1.580	53	
5	Swindon Town	42	21	9	12	100	85	1.176	51	
6	Crystal Palace	42	18	9	15	84	81	1.037	45	
7	Bournemouth & Boscombe Athletic	42	18	8	16	78	66	1.182	44	
8	Luton Town	42	15	14	13	68	66	1.030	44	
9	Newport County	42	19	6	17	57	71	0.803	44	
10	Bristol Rovers	42	16	9	17	78	80	0.975	41	
11	Brentford	42	13	14	15	70	61	1.148	40	
12	Exeter City	42	15	10	17	76	73	1.041	40	
13	Charlton Athletic	42	16	8	18	60	61	0.984	40	
14	Queens Park Rangers	42	15	9	18	65	71	0.915	39	
15	Coventry City	42	15	7	20	71	86	0.826	37	
16	Norwich City	42	12	11	19	59	71	0.831	35	
17	Merthyr Town	42	13	9	20	63	80	0.788	35	
18	Northampton Town	42	15	5	22	59	87	0.678	35	
19	Southend United	42	14	6	22	64	77	0.831	34	
20	Gillingham	42	11	10	21	54	72	0.750	32	
21	Watford	42	12	8	22	57	87	0.655	32	Re-elected
22	Aberdare Athletic (R)	42	9	7	26	62	101	0.614	25	Failed re-election and demoted to the Southern League

(C) Champions; (P) Promoted; (R) Relegated

=== Results ===
Home \ Away	ADE	B&BA	BRE	B&HA	BRI	BRR	CHA	COV	CRY	EXE	GIL	LUT	MER	MIL	NPC	NOR	NWC	PLY	QPR	STD	SWI	WAT
Aberdare Athletic		2–1	3–1	2–2	3–7	2–1	0–0	0–7	2–3	3–1	2–1	0–1	1–2	1–3	0–1	6–1	1–2	5–6	0–2	1–0	1–4	3–2
Bournemouth & Boscombe Athletic	3–0		3–1	1–0	2–0	0–1	0–3	1–2	1–1	4–3	4–2	2–0	1–1	0–1	2–1	3–1	0–1	6–2	6–2	3–0	1–2	6–0
Brentford	1–4	0–0		4–0	3–0	0–2	2–0	7–3	3–0	6–1	0–0	2–2	1–1	0–0	1–1	1–1	3–0	0–0	4–2	3–1	2–2	3–0
Brighton & Hove Albion	3–1	0–2	1–1		3–0	7–0	3–2	1–1	1–1	5–2	3–2	1–1	4–0	3–1	1–0	2–0	3–2	1–2	4–1	2–1	9–3	4–1
Bristol City	2–1	2–0	1–0	0–2		3–1	4–1	3–0	5–4	3–2	9–4	6–0	3–0	4–1	4–1	4–3	1–1	4–2	1–0	5–1	2–0	5–0
Bristol Rovers	4–0	2–1	1–3	0–0	0–5		1–1	1–2	4–1	3–1	2–1	1–2	2–1	1–1	4–0	5–2	1–0	2–2	4–1	5–1	3–1	0–2
Charlton Athletic	5–1	1–3	1–1	1–0	0–1	3–1		4–2	1–2	1–0	3–0	2–2	3–2	1–1	3–0	5–2	2–0	1–1	2–0	1–0	2–2	2–1
Coventry City	1–0	6–2	3–1	1–2	2–5	2–2	1–0		3–1	0–0	0–2	4–1	5–1	1–4	3–1	0–3	1–0	3–3	1–0	1–1	1–3	5–1
Crystal Palace	0–0	2–2	4–3	2–0	4–2	7–4	2–1	1–2		1–0	2–2	1–1	1–1	1–6	6–2	3–0	7–1	1–1	2–1	5–3	5–0	0–1
Exeter City	2–1	4–0	3–1	0–0	1–1	1–1	1–0	8–1	3–1		5–1	1–2	3–0	1–1	2–1	3–2	1–0	0–2	0–2	2–0	3–1	2–0
Gillingham	2–1	1–0	1–2	2–3	1–1	2–0	1–1	2–0	2–1	3–2		0–0	0–1	2–1	0–1	1–2	1–0	4–1	2–2	2–3	4–4	3–0
Luton Town	3–3	4–0	2–1	4–0	0–0	1–1	1–0	4–1	1–0	2–2	2–1		2–1	6–0	4–1	2–0	2–2	3–3	2–0	0–0	1–1	2–2
Merthyr Town	2–2	4–6	1–0	1–0	1–1	3–2	3–0	1–0	1–2	3–3	2–0	4–1		1–0	1–2	2–0	1–1	5–1	4–0	0–1	1–2	1–1
Millwall	1–0	1–1	3–0	1–1	0–1	2–3	3–0	1–0	1–0	4–2	2–0	7–0	3–1		4–1	4–2	6–1	1–3	2–1	2–0	4–1	3–1
Newport County	5–2	2–1	0–0	0–1	0–0	1–0	2–1	4–1	2–1	2–0	1–0	3–2	4–3	1–1		1–0	0–0	2–1	0–2	3–0	5–3	2–1
Northampton Town	2–1	2–2	2–3	0–0	2–0	3–0	0–1	2–1	1–1	2–2	2–1	2–1	2–0	1–4	1–2		3–0	2–1	1–0	2–1	1–0	3–2
Norwich City	2–2	4–1	2–1	0–2	1–1	2–0	2–3	3–0	0–1	4–4	0–0	3–2	4–0	0–2	1–0	6–1		0–2	0–1	1–1	2–1	4–0
Plymouth Argyle	2–0	1–1	2–1	2–0	4–2	3–2	3–1	3–0	7–1	2–0	0–0	1–0	1–1	1–1	4–1	3–0	2–1		2–0	2–1	3–1	4–0
Queens Park Rangers	3–0	1–1	1–1	2–2	1–2	2–2	2–1	1–1	0–2	1–1	1–1	1–0	5–1	1–1	2–0	4–2	4–0	4–2		3–2	0–1	2–4
Southend	5–1	0–3	3–1	0–1	0–1	2–1	5–0	3–1	3–1	1–2	1–0	2–1	3–1	1–1	5–0	2–0	3–3	1–2	0–3		2–2	2–0
Swindon Town	3–2	2–0	4–2	2–2	2–2	3–5	2–0	2–2	6–1	4–2	1–0	2–0	3–2	3–0	3–1	3–1	3–2	1–2	6–2	5–1		4–2
Watford	2–2	1–2	0–0	1–0	0–1	3–3	1–0	1–0	1–2	1–0	4–0	2–1	4–1	2–4	0–0	4–0	1–1	1–4	1–2	4–2	2–2	

Updated to match(es) played on unknown. Source: Ian Laschke: Rothmans Book of Football League Records 1888–89 to 1978–79. Macdonald and Jane’s, London & Sydney, 1980.
Legend: Blue = home team win; Yellow = draw; Red = away team win.

=== Maps ===
Locations of the Football League Third Division South London teams
Locations of the Football League Third Division South teams

== Attendances ==
=== Division One ===
No.	Club	Average
1	Newcastle United FC	36,510
2	Everton FC	31,416
3	Arsenal FC	30,054
4	Liverpool FC	28,502
5	Aston Villa FC	27,393
6	Tottenham Hotspur FC	26,594
7	Manchester United	26,138
8	Leicester City FC	23,718
9	The Wednesday	23,061
10	Sheffield United FC	22,547
11	Birmingham City FC	22,030
12	Bolton Wanderers FC	21,603
13	Leeds United FC	20,666
14	Huddersfield Town AFC	19,536
15	Burnley FC	19,422
16	Derby County FC	19,396
17	Blackburn Rovers FC	18,891
18	West Bromwich Albion FC	18,755
19	Sunderland AFC	18,142
20	West Ham United FC	18,136
21	Bury FC	15,447
22	Cardiff City FC	15,424

== See also ==
- 1926–27 in English football
- 1926 in association football
- 1927 in association football
