= 1942–43 Stoke City F.C. season =

Stoke City
1942–43 season
- Chairman: Mr H. Booth
- Manager: Bob McGrory
- Stadium: Victoria Ground
- Football League North 1st Phase: 6th
- Football League North 2nd Phase: 10th
- Football League War Cup: Second Round
- Top goalscorer: Frank Mountford (20)
- Highest home attendance: 15,000 vs Aston Villa (20 March 1943)
- Lowest home attendance: 1,500 vs Various teams
Home colours

The 1942–43 season was Stoke City's eighth season in the non-competitive War League.

In 1939 World War II was declared and the Football League was cancelled. In its place were formed War Leagues and cups, based on geographical lines rather than based on previous league placement. However, none of these were considered to be competitive football, and thus their records are not recognised by the Football League and thus not included in official records.

== Season review ==
In the 1942–43 season there were again two series of League competition a cup tournament. Stoke played 38 matches and were beaten in ten of those. They took 6th place in the first phase and 10th in the second. Their best result of the season was a 7–1 victory over Walsall in mid December and two 6–1 wins over nearby Crewe Alexandra. Frank Mountford was leading scorer with 20 whilst both Frank Bowyer and Fred Basnett hit 18.

== Results ==
Stoke's score comes first

=== Legend ===
Win	Draw	Loss

=== Football League North 1st Phase ===
Match	Date	Opponent	Venue	Result	Attendance	Scorers
1	20 August 1942	Crewe Alexandra	H	4–1	3,000	Sale (3), Peppitt
2	5 September 1942	Crewe Alexandra	A	2–1	2,204	Sale, Liddle
3	12 September 1942	Wolverhampton Wanderers	A	2–3	4,251	Bowyer, F Mountford
4	19 September 1942	Wolverhampton Wanderers	H	1–0	5,029	Soo
5	26 September 1942	Derby County	H	5–2	5,000	Soo (2), Bowyer, F Mountford (2)
6	3 October 1942	Derby County	A	1–0	10,000	Sale
7	10 October 1942	Birmingham	A	0–1	2,500	
8	17 October 1942	Birmingham	H	1–2	4,000	Sale
9	24 October 1942	Aston Villa	A	0–4	10,000	
10	31 October 1942	Aston Villa	H	1–0	6,000	Sale
11	7 November 1942	West Bromwich Albion	A	0–0	6,564	
12	14 November 1942	West Bromwich Albion	H	5–1	3,331	A. Basnett (2), F Basnett, Bowyer (2)
13	21 November 1942	Wrexham	A	4–2	3,500	Basnett, Caton, Liddle, F Mountford
14	28 November 1942	Wrexham	H	2–0	2,500	F Mountford (2)
15	5 December 1942	Crewe Alexandra	A	3–3	2,500	F Mountford, Liddle, Sale
16	12 December 1942	Crewe Alexandra	H	6–1	2,000	Basnett (2), G Mountford (2), Liddle, F Mountford
17	19 December 1942	Walsall	H	7–1	5,100	F Mountford (2), G Mountford, Basnett, Liddle, Sale, Male (o.g.)
18	25 December 1942	Walsall	A	2–2	2,229	Basnett, Bowyer

=== Football League North 2nd Phase ===
Match	Date	Opponent	Venue	Result	Attendance	Scorers
1	3 April 1943	Notts County	A	1–1	4,000	Bowyer
2	10 April 1943	Notts County	H	1–1	1,500	Liddle
3	17 April 1943	Derby County	A	1–2	5,000	Hamlett
4	24 April 1943	Wolverhampton Wanderers	H	1–4	2,677	F Mountford
5	26 April 1943	Leicester City	A	2–1	2,424	F Mountford (2)
6	1 May 1943	Leicester City	H	3–0	1,500	Bowyer, G Mountford, Vallance

=== Football League War Cup ===
Round	Date	Opponent	Venue	Result	Attendance	Scorers
QR	26 December 1942	Crewe Alexandra	H	6–1	7,000	F Mountford (2), G Mountford, Bowyer, Basnett
QR	2 January 1943	Crewe Alexandra	A	3–1	2,500	G Mountford, Basnett
QR	9 January 1943	Aston Villa	H	1–0	3,000	G Mountford
QR	16 January 1943	Aston Villa	A	0–3	7,000	
QR	23 January 1943	Wolverhampton Wanderers	A	4–4	6,226	Bowyer (2), Basnett (2)
QR	30 January 1943	Wolverhampton Wanderers	H	2–2	5,847	Bowyer, F Mountford
QR	6 February 1943	Walsall	H	2–1	4,000	Bowyer (2)
QR	13 February 1943	Walsall	A	1–4	3,000	Bowyer
QR	20 February 1943	Derby County	H	4–0	6,000	Bowyer, Basnett, Soo
QR	27 February 1943	Derby County	A	1–0	10,000	F Mountford
R1 1st Leg	6 March 1943	Chester	A	3–2	6,500	F Mountford (2), G Mountford
R1 2nd Leg	13 March 1943	Chester	H	5–2	8,000	Basnett, Bowyer (2), Liddle, Sale
R2 1st Leg	20 March 1943	Aston Villa	H	1–3	15,000	Bowyer
R2 2nd Leg	27 March 1943	Aston Villa	A	0–2	20,000	

== Squad statistics ==
Pos.	Name	Matches	
Pos.	Name	Apps	Goals
GK	(England) Phil Bates	17	0
GK	(England) Donald Bliton	7	0
GK	(England) Emmanuel Foster	4	0
GK	(England) Dennis Herod	6	0
DF	(England) Harry Brigham	32	0
DF	(England) Roy Brown	2	0
DF	(England) Sid Clewlow	2	0
DF	(England) Neil Franklin	31	0
DF	(England) Stuart Cowden	1	0
DF	(England) Stanley Glover	1	0
DF	(England) Lol Hamlett	34	1
DF	(England) John McCue	33	0
DF	(England) Billy Mould	2	0
DF	(England) John Sellars	2	0
DF	(England) Fred Sherratt	4	0
MF	(England) Len Howell	1	0
MF	(England) Bill Kinson	5	0
MF	(Scotland) Jock Kirton	1	0
MF	(England) Bobby Liddle	32	7
MF	(England) Alfred Massey	1	0
MF	(England) George Mountford	21	8
MF	(England) R. Micklewright	1	0
MF	(England) Arthur Tutin	1	0
MF	(England) Thomas Vallance	1	1
FW	(England) Albert Basnett	2	2
FW	(England) Fred Basnett	25	18
FW	(England) Frank Baker	1	0
FW	(England) Edwin Blunt	1	0
FW	(England) Frank Bowyer	37	18
FW	(England) Bill Caton	9	1
FW	(England) John Jackson	4	0
FW	(England) Bert Mitchell	2	0
FW	(England) Frank Mountford	36	20
FW	(England) Alexander Ormston	1	0
FW	(England) Syd Peppitt	2	1
FW	(England) Tommy Sale	37	10
FW	(England) Frank Soo	13	4
FW	(England) Harry Ware	1	0
