= 1944–45 Stoke City F.C. season =

Stoke City
1944–45 season
- Chairman: Mr H. Booth
- Manager: Bob McGrory
- Stadium: Victoria Ground
- Football League North 1st Phase: 11th
- Football League North 2nd Phase: 17th
- Football League War Cup: First Round
- Top goalscorer: Tommy Sale (34)
- Highest home attendance: 18,000 vs Various teams
- Lowest home attendance: 800 vs Port Vale (5 May 1945)
Home colours

The 1944–45 season was Stoke City's tenth season in the non-competitive War League.

In 1939 World War II was declared and the Football League was cancelled. In its place were formed War Leagues and cups, based on geographical lines rather than based on previous league placement. However, none of these were considered to be competitive football, and thus their records are not recognised by the Football League and thus not included in official records.

== Season review ==
Tommy Sale now entering the twilight zone of his eventful career again went goal crazy in the 1944–45 season, scoring 34 goals in 40 appearances. In league action, neighbours Port Vale were taken for 14 goals, Stoke winning 8–1 at home and 6–2 away all in the space of eight days (17–24 February 1945) and indeed, during that months Stoke hit 24 times in just four matches. Overall Stoke's form was not that great despite being in fine goalscoring form and they took 11th place in the first phase and 17th in the second.

== Results ==
Stoke's score comes first

=== Legend ===
Win	Draw	Loss

=== Football League North 1st Phase ===
Match	Date	Opponent	Venue	Result	Attendance	Scorers
1	26 August 1944	Aston Villa	A	0–4	25,000	
2	2 September 1944	Aston Villa	H	3–1	10,000	Pointon, Sale (2)
3	9 September 1944	Northampton Town	H	5–0	9,000	Pointon, Bowyer, Steele (3)
4	16 September 1944	Northampton Town	A	1–1	2,500	Bowyer
5	23 September 1944	Wolverhampton Wanderers	H	2–0	13,806	Pointon (2)
6	30 September 1944	Wolverhampton Wanderers	A	1–4	12,134	Sale
7	7 October 1944	Walsall	A	1–1	5,000	Sale
8	14 October 1944	Walsall	H	0–2	4,000	
9	21 October 1944	Birmingham	H	0–0	6,000	
10	28 October 1944	Birmingham	A	1–1	8,000	Steele
11	4 November 1944	West Bromwich Albion	A	3–2	18,656	Sale (2), Matthews
12	11 November 1944	West Bromwich Albion	H	2–3	8,067	Sale, Steele
13	18 November 1944	Port Vale	H	2–0	18,000	Bowyer (2)
14	25 November 1944	Port Vale	A	0–3	9,618	
15	2 December 1944	Coventry City	A	1–0	6,405	Sale
16	9 December 1944	Coventry City	H	5–0	4,020	Sale (3), Bowyer, Mannion
17	16 December 1944	Leicester City	H	5–2	5,000	Sale (2), Matthews (2), Frame (o.g.)
18	23 December 1944	Leicester City	A	5–1	5,000	Sale (2), Matthews, Bowyer, G Mountford
19	26 December 1944	Derby County	H	4–2	8,000	Sale (3), Basnett

=== Football League North 2nd Phase ===
Match	Date	Opponent	Venue	Result	Attendance	Scorers
1	2 April 1945	Derby County	A	1–2	22,000	Sellars
2	7 April 1945	Manchester United	A	1–6	45,616	Chilton (o.g.)
3	14 April 1945	Manchester United	H	1–4	5,000	Whalley (o.g.)
4	5 May 1945	Port Vale	H	6–0	800	G Mountford (4), Sellars, Sale
5	9 May 1945	Port Vale	H	4–2	5,000	Sellars (2), Kirton, Jackson
6	19 May 1945	Everton	H	5–1	2,500	G Mountford, Jackson, Sale, Sellars, Bayford
7	21 May 1945	Crewe Alexandra	A	2–3	4,000	Jackson (2)
8	26 May 1945	Everton	A	2–3	8,000	Bowyer, Sale

=== Football League War Cup ===
Round	Date	Opponent	Venue	Result	Attendance	Scorers
QR	30 December 1944	Wolverhampton Wanderers	H	2–0	9,896	Bowyer, Jackson
QR	6 January 1945	Wrexham	H	2–2	12,000	Sale (2)
QR	13 January 1945	Wrexham	A	1–2	8,000	G Mountford
QR	3 February 1945	Chester	A	3–2	3,500	G Mountford, Basnett, Sale
QR	10 February 1945	Chester	H	7–0	12,000	Basnett (3), Sale (3), F Mountford
QR	17 February 1945	Port Vale	H	8–1	13,000	Basnett, G Mountford (5), Soo
QR	24 February 1945	Port Vale	A	6–2	18,000	Sale (2), Steele (3), Soo
QR	3 March 1945	Wolverhampton Wanderers	A	3–1	17,784	Sale (2), G Mountford
QR	10 March 1945	Crewe Alexandra	H	1–2	10,000	Liddle
QR	17 March 1945	Crewe Alexandra	A	2–2	11,000	Sale (2)
QR	24 March 1945	Bury	A	2–3	11,629	Steele (2)
QR	31 March 1945	Bury	H	3–0	18,000	Sale, G Mountford, Basnett
R1 1st leg	21 April 1945	Aston Villa	H	1–0	6,000	Jackson
R1 2nd leg	28 April 1945	Aston Villa	A	0–2	15,000	

== Squad statistics ==
Pos.	Name	Matches	
Pos.	Name	Apps	Goals
GK	(England) Dennis Herod	25	0
GK	(England) Emmanuel Foster	6	0
GK	(England) William Leigh	2	0
GK	(England) George Marks	2	0
GK	(England) Edgar Podmore	6	0
DF	(England) Harry Brigham	36	0
DF	(England) Roy Brown	2	0
DF	(England) Stuart Cowden	15	0
DF	(England) Neil Franklin	32	0
DF	(England) John McCue	33	0
DF	(England) Billy Mould	2	0
DF	(England) John Sellars	19	5
DF	(England) Cyril Watkin	9	0
DF	(Scotland) Stan Williams	3	0
MF	(England) Arthur Cunliffe	1	0
MF	(England) Bill Kinson	4	0
MF	(Scotland) Jock Kirton	11	1
MF	(England) Bobby Liddle	11	1
MF	(England) John Mannion	5	1
MF	(England) George Mountford	23	15
MF	(England) Alexander Ormston	4	0
MF	(Scotland) Tommy Pearson	1	0
MF	(England) Frank Soo	8	3
FW	(England) Albert Basnett	1	0
FW	(England) Fred Basnett	17	7
FW	(England) Eric Bayford	2	1
FW	(England) Frank Bowyer	23	8
FW	(England) Thomas Howshall	1	0
FW	(England) John Jackson	23	6
FW	(England) Stanley Matthews	15	4
FW	(England) Frank Mountford	40	1
FW	(England) Syd Peppitt	2	0
FW	(England) Bill Pointon	8	4
FW	(England) Tommy Sale	40	34
FW	(England) Freddie Steele	17	10
FW	(England) Bobby Windsor	2	0
