= 1941–42 Stoke City F.C. season =

Stoke City
1941–42 season
- Chairman: Mr H. Booth
- Manager: Bob McGrory
- Stadium: Victoria Ground
- Football League North 1st Phase: 5th
- Football League North 2nd Phase: 16th
- Football League War Cup: First Round
- Top goalscorer: Tommy Sale (56)
- Highest home attendance: 13,864 vs West Bromwich Albion (6 April 1942)
- Lowest home attendance: 1,500 vs Various teams
Home colours

The 1941–42 season was Stoke City's seventh season in the non-competitive War League.

In 1939 World War II was declared and the Football League was cancelled. In its place were formed War Leagues and cups, based on geographical lines rather than based on previous league placement. However, none of these were considered to be competitive football, and thus their records are not recognised by the Football League and thus not included in official records.

== Season review ==
There were three separate competitions in the 1941–42 season, two series of Football League North and a Football League War Cup tournament. Stoke did well without pulling up too many trees, finishing 5th in the first phase of the league and then a rather poor 16th in the second. Attendances were quite small due to obvious restrictions imposed by the authorities but the entertainment value was high with goals in abundance, both home and away. Among the many impressive scorelines for Stoke were those of 8–3 v Everton, 7–1 v Wrexham, 9–0 & 7–2 v Tranmere Rovers and a 10–0 defeat by Northampton Town in late May. That heavy reverse against the "Cobblers" was unbelievable as Stoke fielded a strong line up. Tommy Sale was in incredible goalscoring form this season hitting 56 goals including eleven hat-tricks.

== Results ==
Stoke's score comes first

=== Legend ===
Win	Draw	Loss

=== Football League North 1st Phase ===
Match	Date	Opponent	Venue	Result	Attendance	Scorers
1	30 August 1941	Everton	H	8–3	4,000	Basnett (2), Sale (3), Brigham, Liddle, Blunt
2	6 September 1941	Everton	H	1–3	6,000	Brigham
3	13 September 1941	Wrexham	A	7–1	4,500	Blunt, Bowyer (2), Basnett, Brigham, Sale (2)
4	20 September 1941	Wrexham	H	5–2	3,000	Blunt, Bowyer, Sale (3)
5	27 September 1941	Chester	H	2–5	4,000	Blunt, Bowyer
6	4 October 1941	Chester	A	4–3	4,000	Bowyer (2), Basnett, Sale
7	11 October 1941	Manchester City	A	3–4	3,000	Sale (3)
8	18 October 1941	Manchester City	H	5–0	3,000	Sale (3), Basnett, Peppitt
9	25 October 1941	Manchester United	H	1–1	5,000	Liddle
10	1 November 1941	Manchester United	A	0–3	4,000	
11	8 November 1941	New Brighton	A	5–3	2,000	Basnett, Hamlett, Mountford (2), Freddie Steele
12	15 November 1941	New Brighton	H	4–0	2,094	Hamlett, Sale (3)
13	22 November 1941	Tranmere Rovers	H	9–0	1,500	Sale (5), Basnett (2), Mountford, Bowyer
14	29 November 1941	Tranmere Rovers	A	7–2	2,000	Sale (3), Basnett (3), Liddle
15	6 December 1941	Stockport County	A	6–1	500	Sale (3), Soo (2), Basnett
16	13 December 1941	Stockport County	H	3–1	2,000	Sale, Mountford, Basnett
17	20 December 1941	Liverpool	A	1–1	4,000	Bowyer
18	25 December 1941	Liverpool	H	4–3	11,000	Sale (2), Basnett, Liddle

=== Football League North 2nd Phase ===
Match	Date	Opponent	Venue	Result	Attendance	Scorers
1	28 March 1942	Blackpool	A	0–4	4,000	
2	11 April 1942	Walsall	A	0–1	1,047	
3	18 April 1942	Walsall	H	2–3	1,500	Sale, Liddle
4	25 April 1942	Chester	A	4–2	1,500	Sale, Basnett, Bowyer
5	2 May 1942	Chester	H	2–2	2,000	Liddle (2)
6	9 May 1942	Preston North End	A	2–1	2,500	Liddle (2)
7	23 May 1942	Northampton Town	A	0–10	3,000	
8	30 May 1942	Northampton Town	H	3–2	1,500	Liddle, Liddle, Blunt

=== Football League War Cup ===
Round	Date	Opponent	Venue	Result	Attendance	Scorers
QR	27 December 1941	Walsall	A	4–1	3,000	Clewlow, Sale (3)
QR	3 January 1942	Walsall	H	8–0	3,000	Sale (6), Soo, Blunt
QR	10 January 1942	West Bromwich Albion	A	0–4	7,335	
QR	17 January 1942	West Bromwich Albion	H	2–1	4,573	Mitchell, Sale
QR	31 January 1942	Chesterfield	H	2–1	1,500	Sale (2)
QR	14 February 1942	Bolton Wanderers	H	3–1	2,000	Sale (3)
QR	21 February 1942	Nottingham Forest	A	0–1	1,000	
QR	28 February 1942	Nottingham Forest	H	1–3	3,480	Sale
QR	14 March 1942	Chesterfield	A	1–2	2,500	Sale
QR	21 March 1942	Bolton Wanderers	A	1–1	3,000	Basnett
R1 1st leg	4 April 1942	West Bromwich Albion	H	5–3	5,000	Basnett (2), Sale (3)
R1 2nd leg	6 April 1942	West Bromwich Albion	H	1–6	13,864	Sale

== Squad statistics ==
Pos.	Name	Matches	
Pos.	Name	Apps	Goals
GK	(England) Dennis Herod	38	0
DF	(England) Harry Brigham	33	3
DF	(England) Roy Brown	1	0
DF	(England) Sid Clewlow	2	1
DF	(England) Neil Franklin	32	0
DF	(England) Stanley Glover	34	0
DF	(England) Harry Griffiths	3	0
DF	(England) Lol Hamlett	35	2
DF	(England) Eric Hampson	1	0
DF	(England) Eric Hayward	3	0
DF	(England) John McCue	3	0
DF	(England) Billy Mould	10	0
DF	(Wales) Emlyn Williams	3	0
MF	(England) Edwin Blunt	20	6
MF	(England) Stanley Harrison	2	0
MF	(Scotland) Jock Kirton	8	0
MF	(England) Bobby Liddle	33	10
MF	(England) Frank Soo	12	3
FW	(England) Fred Basnett	32	18
FW	(England) Frank Bowyer	37	10
FW	(England) Bill Caton	11	0
FW	(England) Eric Longford	2	0
FW	(England) Bert Mitchell	2	1
FW	(England) Frank Mountford	8	4
FW	(England) Alexander Ormston	2	0
FW	(England) Syd Peppitt	4	1
FW	(England) Tommy Sale	37	56
FW	(England) Freddie Steele	8	1
FW	(England) James Westland	2	0
