= 1940–41 Stoke City F.C. season =

Stoke City
1940–41 season
- Chairman: Mr H. Booth
- Manager: Bob McGrory
- Stadium: Victoria Ground
- South Regional Championship: 25th
- Football League War Cup: First Round
- Highest home attendance: 4,980 vs Birmingham (9 November 1940)
- Lowest home attendance: 300 vs Notts County (25 January 1941)
Home colours

The 1940–41 season was Stoke City's sixth season in the non-competitive War League.

In 1939 World War II was declared and the Football League was cancelled. In its place were formed War Leagues and cups, based on geographical lines rather than based on previous league placement. However, none of these were considered to be competitive football, and thus their records are not recognised by the Football League and thus not included in official records.

== Season review ==
With so many players unable to get leave from the army on matchdays this gave the club a perfect opportunity to field several younger players and when Stoke kicked off the 1940–41 season against Notts County on 31 August 1940 they fielded a side with an average age of 21. Several clubs did not play as many matches as others during the season and Stoke, well below strength and lacking in form, conceded a remarkable 23 goals in just four games in December and January.

Stoke's back line caved in regularly and seven goals were put past them on three occasions at Mansfield, Northampton and Walsall. Stoke finished 25th (out of 34) in the final South Regional League this season when a points average decided league placings rather than points simply because some teams did not play as many games as others e.g. Birmingham played 16 and Stoke 36.

== Final league table ==
- Note: Due to the inconsistent number of matches played by teams in 1940–41, positions were decided by goal-average.

| Pos | Team | Pld | W | D | L | GF | GA | GAv |
|---|---|---|---|---|---|---|---|---|
| 1 | Crystal Palace | 27 | 16 | 4 | 7 | 86 | 44 | 1.955 |
| 2 | West Ham United | 25 | 14 | 6 | 5 | 70 | 39 | 1.795 |
| 3 | Coventry City | 10 | 5 | 3 | 2 | 28 | 16 | 1.750 |
| 4 | Arsenal | 19 | 10 | 5 | 4 | 66 | 38 | 1.737 |
| 5 | Cardiff City | 24 | 12 | 5 | 7 | 75 | 50 | 1.500 |
| 6 | Reading | 26 | 14 | 5 | 7 | 73 | 51 | 1.431 |
| 7 | Norwich City | 19 | 9 | 2 | 8 | 73 | 55 | 1.327 |
| 8 | Watford | 35 | 15 | 6 | 14 | 96 | 73 | 1.315 |
| 9 | Portsmouth | 31 | 16 | 2 | 13 | 92 | 71 | 1.296 |
| 10 | Tottenham Hotspur | 23 | 9 | 5 | 9 | 53 | 41 | 1.293 |
| 11 | Millwall | 31 | 16 | 5 | 10 | 73 | 57 | 1.281 |
| 12 | Walsall | 32 | 14 | 7 | 11 | 100 | 80 | 1.250 |
| 13 | West Bromwich Albion | 28 | 13 | 5 | 10 | 73 | 57 | 1.281 |
| 14 | Leicester City | 33 | 17 | 5 | 11 | 83 | 73 | 1.137 |
| 15 | Northampton Town | 30 | 14 | 3 | 13 | 84 | 71 | 1.183 |
| 16 | Bristol City | 20 | 10 | 2 | 8 | 55 | 48 | 1.146 |
| 17 | Mansfield Town | 29 | 12 | 6 | 11 | 77 | 68 | 1.132 |
| 18 | Charlton Athletic | 19 | 7 | 4 | 8 | 37 | 34 | 1.088 |
| 19 | Aldershot | 24 | 14 | 2 | 8 | 73 | 68 | 1.074 |
| 20 | Brentford | 23 | 9 | 3 | 11 | 51 | 51 | 1.000 |
| 21 | Chelsea | 23 | 10 | 4 | 9 | 57 | 58 | 0.983 |
| 22 | Birmingham City | 16 | 7 | 1 | 8 | 38 | 43 | 0.884 |
| 23 | Fulham | 30 | 10 | 7 | 13 | 62 | 73 | 0.849 |
| 24 | Luton Town | 35 | 11 | 7 | 17 | 82 | 100 | 0.820 |
| 25 | Stoke City | 36 | 9 | 9 | 18 | 76 | 96 | 0.792 |
| 26 | Queens Park Rangers | 23 | 8 | 3 | 12 | 47 | 60 | 0.783 |
| 27 | Brighton & Hove Albion | 25 | 8 | 7 | 10 | 51 | 75 | 0.680 |
| 28 | Nottingham Forest | 25 | 7 | 3 | 15 | 50 | 77 | 0.649 |
| 29 | Bournemouth | 27 | 9 | 3 | 15 | 59 | 92 | 0.641 |
| 30 | Notts County | 21 | 8 | 3 | 10 | 42 | 66 | 0.636 |
| 31 | Southend United | 29 | 12 | 4 | 13 | 64 | 101 | 0.634 |
| 32 | Southampton | 31 | 4 | 4 | 23 | 53 | 111 | 0.477 |
| 33 | Swansea Town | 10 | 2 | 1 | 7 | 12 | 33 | 0.364 |
| 34 | Clapton Orient | 15 | 1 | 3 | 11 | 19 | 66 | 0.288 |

== Results ==
Stoke's score comes first

=== Legend ===
| Win | Draw | Loss |

=== War League South Regional Championship ===
| Match | Date | Opponent | Venue | Result | Attendance | Scorers |
|---|---|---|---|---|---|---|
| 1 | 31 August 1940 | Notts County | H | 4–1 | 2,421 | Mountford (3), Sale |
| 2 | 7 September 1940 | Notts County | A | 2–3 | 3,000 | Sale, Bowyer |
| 3 | 14 September 1940 | Mansfield Town | A | 3–2 | 1,000 | Bowyer, Mountford, Liddle |
| 4 | 21 September 1940 | Mansfield Town | H | 5–0 | 2,000 | Bowyer (2), Mountford (2), Liddle |
| 5 | 28 September 1940 | Leicester City | A | 0–1 | 3,000 | |
| 6 | 5 October 1940 | Leicester City | H | 3–3 | 2,814 | Mountford (2), Sale |
| 7 | 12 October 1940 | West Bromwich Albion | A | 1–0 | 4,091 | Bowyer |
| 8 | 19 October 1940 | West Bromwich Albion | H | 1–3 | 3,392 | Soo |
| 9 | 26 October 1940 | Nottingham Forest | A | 3–3 | 1,500 | Mountford (2), Bowyer |
| 10 | 2 November 1940 | Nottingham Forest | H | 5–0 | 714 | Mountford, Bowyer, Sale, Soo (2) |
| 11 | 9 November 1940 | Birmingham | H | 5–0 | 4,980 | Mountford (3), Ormston (2) |
| 12 | 16 November 1940 | Birmingham | A | 2–6 | 1,462 | Liddle, Smith |
| 13 | 30 November 1940 | Tranmere Rovers | A | 2–2 | 1,000 | Mountford (2) |
| 14 | 7 December 1940 | Cardiff City | H | 5–1 | 2,000 | Mountford, Sale (2), Steele, Bowyer |
| 15 | 14 December 1940 | Cardiff City | A | 0–4 | 800 | |
| 16 | 21 December 1940 | Walsall | A | 2–2 | 540 | Soo, Liddle |
| 17 | 25 December 1940 | Mansfield Town | A | 2–7 | 3,450 | Mountford, Smith |
| 18 | 28 December 1940 | Walsall | A | 1–5 | 3,518 | Steele |
| 19 | 4 January 1941 | Leicester City | A | 2–6 | 3,000 | Mountford, Sale |
| 20 | 11 January 1941 | Leicester City | H | 3–5 | 2,000 | Mountford (2), Sale |
| 21 | 25 January 1941 | Notts County | H | 2–2 | 300 | Sale, Dunkley |
| 22 | 1 February 1941 | Notts County | A | 1–2 | 1,000 | Steele |
| 23 | 1 March 1941 | Walsall | H | 1–1 | 1,045 | Sale |
| 24 | 8 March 1941 | Walsall | A | 3–7 | 1,616 | Bowyer, Liddle, Longford |
| 25 | 15 March 1941 | West Bromwich Albion | A | 2–2 | 2,086 | Liddle, Franklin |
| 26 | 22 March 1941 | West Bromwich Albion | H | 0–2 | 794 | |
| 27 | 29 March 1941 | Nottingham Forest | H | 4–0 | 500 | Mountford (3), Sale |
| 28 | 5 April 1941 | Nottingham Forest | A | 2–3 | 200 | Basnett, Mitchell |
| 29 | 14 April 1941 | Northampton Town | A | 0–7 | 3,000 | |
| 30 | 26 April 1941 | Chester | H | 1–2 | 400 | Sale |
| 31 | 3 May 1941 | Chester | H | 0–1 | 1,200 | |
| 32 | 10 May 1941 | Northampton Town | H | 2–1 | 400 | Bowyer, Brigham |
| 33 | 17 May 1941 | Chesterfield | H | 2–2 | 500 | Steele, Brigham |
| 34 | 24 May 1941 | Chesterfield | A | 1–5 | 1,000 | Sale |
| 35 | 2 June 1941 | Wrexham | A | 3–3 | 1,000 | Sale, Steele, Basnett |
| 36 | 7 June 1941 | Leicester City | A | 1–2 | 1,000 | Brigham |

=== Football League War Cup ===
| Round | Date | Opponent | Venue | Result | Attendance | Scorers |
|---|---|---|---|---|---|---|
| R1 1st Leg | 15 February 1941 | Mansfield Town | A | 1–6 | 2,000 | Mountford |
| R1 2nd Leg | 22 February 1941 | Mansfield Town | H | 2–0 | 1,000 | Sale, Longford |

=== Friendlies ===
| Match | Date | Opponent | Venue | Result | Attendance | Scorers |
|---|---|---|---|---|---|---|
| 1 | 23 November 1940 | Royal Air Force XI | H | 3–2 | 825 | Sale (2), Smith |
| 2 | 8 February 1941 | Royal Air Force XI | H | 9–1 | 300 | Mountford (4), Steele (4), Sale |
| 3 | 12 April 1941 | Army XI | H | 7–2 | 400 | Mitchell (4), Liddle, Mountford (2) |
| 4 | 21 April 1941 | Wrexham | A | 2–5 | 3,370 | Mitchell, Sale |

== Squad statistics ==
| Pos. | Name | Matches | |
| Pos. | Name | Apps | Goals |
|---|---|---|---|
| GK | (England) Pat Bridges | 18 | 0 |
| GK | (England) Lionel Hayward | 1 | 0 |
| GK | (England) Dennis Herod | 13 | 0 |
| GK | (England) Tom Holden | 3 | 0 |
| GK | (Wales) David Jones | 1 | 0 |
| GK | (England) Norman Wilkinson | 2 | 0 |
| DF | (England) Harry Brigham | 30 | 3 |
| DF | (England) Jack Challinor | 5 | 0 |
| DF | (England) Neil Franklin | 33 | 1 |
| DF | (England) Stanley Glover | 20 | 0 |
| DF | (England) Harry Griffiths | 1 | 0 |
| DF | (England) Jack Griffiths | 3 | 0 |
| DF | (England) Eric Hampson | 22 | 0 |
| DF | (England) Stanley Harrison | 11 | 0 |
| DF | (England) Eric Hayward | 1 | 0 |
| DF | (England) Bill Kinson | 2 | 0 |
| DF | (England) John McCue | 14 | 0 |
| DF | (England) Billy Mould | 2 | 0 |
| MF | (England) Edwin Blunt | 1 | 0 |
| MF | (England) Wally Gould | 1 | 0 |
| MF | (England) Len Howell | 1 | 0 |
| MF | (Scotland) Jock Kirton | 4 | 0 |
| MF | (England) Alfred Massey | 2 | 0 |
| MF | (England) Clement Smith | 6 | 2 |
| MF | (England) Arthur Turner | 11 | 0 |
| MF | (England) Frank Soo | 18 | 4 |
| MF | (England) Edward Wordley | 2 | 0 |
| FW | (England) Fred Basnett | 5 | 2 |
| FW | (England) Frank Bowyer | 28 | 10 |
| FW | (England) C. Curtis | 1 | 0 |
| FW | (England) Robert Dunkley | 3 | 1 |
| FW | (England) John Jackson | 2 | 0 |
| FW | (England) Bobby Liddle | 32 | 7 |
| FW | (England) Eric Longford | 7 | 2 |
| FW | (England) Stanley Matthews | 12 | 0 |
| FW | (England) Bert Mitchell | 6 | 1 |
| FW | (England) Frank Mountford | 29 | 23 |
| FW | (England) Alexander Ormston | 3 | 2 |
| FW | (England) Syd Peppitt | 4 | 0 |
| FW | (England) Tommy Sale | 36 | 17 |
| FW | (England) Freddie Steele | 16 | 5 |
| FW | (England) George Stevens | 1 | 0 |
| FW | (England) Harry Ware | 1 | 0 |
| FW | (Scotland) James Westland | 1 | 0 |
