= 1945–46 Stoke City F.C. season =

Stoke City
1945–46 season
- Chairman: Mr H. Booth
- Manager: Bob McGrory
- Stadium: Victoria Ground
- Football League North: 13th
- FA Cup: Quarter final
- Top goalscorer: Freddie Steele (43)
- Highest home attendance: 50,735 vs Bolton Wanderers
- Lowest home attendance: 6,594 vs Leeds United (13 September 1945)
Home colours

The 1945–46 season was Stoke City's eleventh and final season in the non-competitive War League.

In 1939 World War II was declared and the Football League was cancelled. In its place were formed War Leagues and cups, based on geographical lines rather than based on previous league placement. However, none of these were considered to be competitive football, and thus their records are not recognised by the Football League and thus not included in official records. The FA Cup made a welcome return after seven years out. However Stoke were involved in the Burnden Park disaster.

== Season review ==
Crowds up and down the country, including Stoke's were now beginning to show an increase as the situation in Europe began to improve and when the 1945–46 season commenced there was a feeling that the Football League would not be too long in starting up again, especially now that the FA Cup was reinstated into the fixture list, with clubs playing ties over two legs. For the final war time league season the idea of two phases of league fixtures was scrapped and a more traditional format took its place and Stoke finished in 13th position.

In the FA Cup Stoke progressed past Burnley and both Sheffield clubs United then Wednesday before drawing Bolton Wanderers in the quarter-final. The first leg was played at the Victoria Ground on 2 March 1946, Bolton won the match 2–0 to put them in prime position to reach the semi-final. However tragedy struck in the second leg at Burnden Park as crush barriers gave way on part of the terracing and 33 spectators were killed with another 520 injured. The match itself was delayed from some time and it eventually finished goalless.

== Final league table ==
Pos	Team	Pld	W	D	L	GF	GA	GR	Pts
11	Liverpool	42	17	9	16	80	70	1.143	43
12	Middlesbrough	42	17	9	16	75	87	0.862	43
13	Stoke City	42	18	6	18	88	79	1.114	42
14	Bradford	42	17	6	19	71	84	0.845	40
15	Huddersfield Town	42	17	4	21	90	89	1.011	38

Source: rsssf.com

== Results ==
Stoke's score comes first

=== Legend ===
Win	Draw	Loss

=== Football League North ===
Match	Date	Opponent	Venue	Result	Attendance	Scorers
1	25 August 1945	Bradford	A	0–1	15,725	
2	1 September 1945	Bradford	H	3–0	13,498	Sale, Steele, Basnett
3	8 September 1945	Manchester City	H	2–0	15,784	G Mountford, F Mountford
4	13 September 1945	Leeds United	H	2–1	6,594	Steele (2)
5	15 September 1945	Manchester City	A	2–5	12,881	Steele (2)
6	20 September 1945	Manchester United	H	1–2	16,917	G Mountford
7	22 September 1945	Newcastle United	A	1–9	45,000	Steele
8	28 September 1945	Newcastle United	H	3–1	20,229	G Mountford, Basnett
9	6 October 1945	Sheffield Wednesday	H	3–0	21,451	Basnett, Steele (2)
10	13 October 1945	Sheffield Wednesday	A	0–1	33,387	
11	17 October 1945	Sunderland	A	2–4	10,000	Sale, Steele
12	20 October 1945	Huddersfield Town	A	1–3	11,493	Steele
13	27 October 1945	Huddersfield Town	H	6–2	18,531	Steele (3), Sale, G Mountford (2)
14	3 November 1945	Chesterfield	H	6–1	28,387	Steele (3), Sale, Matthews, Basnett
15	10 November 1945	Chesterfield	A	1–1	26,301	Basnett
16	17 November 1945	Barnsley	A	3–3	25,000	Basnett, Steele (2)
17	24 November 1945	Barnsley	H	4–0	15,707	Steele (2), Antonio, Matthews
18	1 December 1945	Everton	H	2–3	20,743	Sellars, G Mountford
19	8 December 1945	Everton	A	1–6	28,066	Steele
20	15 December 1945	Bolton Wanderers	A	2–2	22,402	G Mountford, Peppitt
21	22 December 1945	Bolton Wanderers	H	4–1	13,000	Steele (3), Antonio
22	25 December 1945	Preston North End	H	6–0	18,603	Steele (2), Antonio (2), Sellars, G Mountford
23	26 December 1945	Preston North End	A	4–2	23,024	Sellars (2), Steele, Dodd
24	29 December 1945	Leeds United	A	0–0	22,000	
25	19 January 1946	Sunderland	H	0–0	8,593	
26	2 February 1946	Sheffield United	A	0–4	16,608	
27	16 February 1946	Middlesbrough	H	1–4	9,123	Brigham
28	23 February 1946	Burnley	H	0–0	11,689	
29	16 March 1946	Grimsby Town	A	2–0	15,000	Steele, Sale
30	23 March 1946	Blackpool	H	6–3	16,416	Steele (4), Sale (2)
31	30 March 1946	Blackpool	A	1–2	13,006	Sale
32	1 April 1946	Burnley	A	0–1	10,607	
33	6 April 1946	Liverpool	H	0–1	11,000	
34	8 April 1946	Sheffield United	H	0–3	9,000	
35	13 April 1946	Liverpool	A	1–4	23,880	Peppitt
36	15 April 1946	Grimsby Town	H	4–2	7,000	Boothway, Sellars, Peppitt, Ormston
37	19 April 1946	Bury	A	4–2	12,000	Sellars (2), G Mountford, Steele
38	20 April 1946	Blackburn Rovers	A	1–5	9,000	Peppitt
39	22 April 1946	Bury	H	2–0	12,206	Antonio, Steele
40	27 April 1946	Blackburn Rovers	H	5–0	8,000	Antonio (2), Steele, Ormston (2)
41	1 May 1946	Middlesbrough	A	1–3	25,000	Steele
42	4 May 1946	Manchester United	A	1–2	37,773	Peppitt

=== FA Cup ===
Round	Date	Opponent	Venue	Result	Attendance	Scorers
R3 1st Leg	5 January 1946	Burnley	H	3–1	21,776	Steele (3)
R3 2nd Leg	7 January 1946	Burnley	A	1–2	18,403	Antonio
R4 1st Leg	26 January 1946	Sheffield United	H	2–0	35,306	G Mountford, Steele
R4 2nd Leg	28 January 1946	Sheffield United	A	2–3	50,208	Antonio, Steele
R5 1st Leg	9 February 1946	Sheffield Wednesday	H	2–0	40,452	Steele (2)
R5 2nd Leg	11 February 1946	Sheffield Wednesday	A	0–0	62,728	
Quarter final 1st Leg	2 March 1946	Bolton Wanderers	H	0–2	50,736	
Quarter final 2nd Leg	9 March 1946	Bolton Wanderers	A	0–0	65,419	

== Squad statistics ==
Note: Only the FA Cup appearances are considered as official competitive matches

Pos.	Name	War League		FA Cup		Total	
Pos.	Name	Apps	Goals	Apps	Goals	Apps	Goals
GK	(England) Dennis Herod	42	0	8	0	50	0
DF	(England) Harry Brigham	42	1	8	0	50	1
DF	(England) Roy Brown	8	0	0	0	8	0
DF	(England) Jack Challinor	4	0	0	0	4	0
DF	(England) Neil Franklin	23	0	8	0	31	0
DF	(England) Eric Hampson	2	0	0	0	2	0
DF	(England) Stanley Harrison	1	0	0	0	1	0
DF	(England) John McCue	15	0	8	0	23	0
DF	(England) Harry Meakin	3	0	0	0	3	0
DF	(England) Billy Mould	4	0	0	0	4	0
DF	(England) Frank Mountford	40	1	8	0	48	1
DF	(England) John Sellars	21	7	0	0	21	7
DF	(England) Cyril Topsham	12	0	0	0	12	0
MF	(England) Stuart Cowden	21	0	1	0	22	0
MF	(Scotland) Jock Kirton	25	0	7	0	32	0
MF	(England) Stanley Matthews	20	2	8	0	28	2
MF	(England) Syd Peppitt	13	5	2	0	15	5
MF	(England) Bobby Windsor	3	0	0	0	3	0
FW	(England) George Antonio	16	7	7	2	23	9
FW	(England) Frank Baker	9	0	2	0	11	0
FW	(England) Fred Basnett	18	8	2	0	20	8
FW	(England) Jack Boothway	1	1	0	0	1	1
FW	(England) Frank Bowyer	1	0	0	0	1	0
FW	(England) Harry Craddock	2	0	0	0	2	0
FW	(England) John Dodd	1	1	0	0	1	1
FW	(England) John Jackson	2	0	0	0	2	0
FW	(England) Bill Kinson	7	0	0	0	7	0
FW	(England) George Mountford	32	8	6	1	38	9
FW	(England) Alexander Ormston	11	3	4	0	15	3
FW	(England) Tommy Sale	23	8	1	0	24	8
FW	(England) Freddie Steele	37	36	8	7	44	43
FW	(England) Thomas Vallance	1	0	0	0	1	0
