= Norman Wilkinson (footballer, born 1910) =

English footballer (1910–1975)

Personal information
- Full name: Norman Wilkinson
- Date of birth: 9 June 1910
- Place of birth: Tantobie, County Durham, England
- Date of death: 18 May 1975 (aged 64)
- Place of death: Stoke-on-Trent, England
- Height: 5 ft 11 1/2 in (1.82 m)
- Position: Goalkeeper

Senior career*
Years	Team	Apps	(Gls)
1931–1932	Tanfield Lea		
1932	West Stanley		
1932–1935	Huddersfield Town	0	(0)
1935–1952	Stoke City	186	(0)
1952	Oswestry Town		
- * Club domestic league appearances and goals

Norman Wilkinson (9 June 1910 – 18 May 1975) was an English footballer who played in the Football League for Stoke City.

== Career ==
Born in Tantobie, County Durham, on 9 June 1910, Wilkinson a collier, began with junior side Tanfield Lea as a centre-half. He then played for West Stanley on the Durham Coalfield where he began to play as a goalkeeper. At the age of twenty he signed for Huddersfield Town, where he played second fiddle to England international Hugh Turner. Bob McGrory wary of Stoke's lack of a decent goalkeeper signed Wilkinson from Huddersfield's reserves for just £100 in July 1935.

At 5 ft 11 in and just 11 st Wilkinson had a slightly sullen look, with heavy eyebrows and a balding pate and would often walk around his penalty area nervously pulling up his woollen gloves. Although he did not inspire confidence he proved to be a fine shot stopper. His main weakness was a penchant for dropping crosses when under pressure from centre forwards. He remained first choice until World War II when he returned to the north east and guested for Hull City, Sheffield Wednesday, Nottingham Forest and Doncaster Rovers.

On being demobbed Wilkinson had suffered hardship having seen action in France and was in poor physical condition. This led to the Stoke directors attempting to terminate his employment. Wilkinson protested to the FA and the law stated that all returning service men would be entitled to their old job. He won his case and Stoke made him fourth choice 'keeper behind Dennis Herod, Emmanuel Foster and Arthur Jepson. He seemed to be drifting to retirement but due to Herod being injury prone Wilkinson was handed a last chance against Blackpool on the penultimate fixture of the 1948–49 season. He produced a fine display including a wonder save from City legend Stanley Matthews as Stoke won 3–2. His final appearance for Stoke came against his old club Huddersfield Town and Wilkinson kept a clean sheet in a 0–0 draw. He was aged 41 years and 275 days the fourth oldest player to appear for Stoke.

== Career statistics ==
Club	Season	League			FA Cup		Total	
Club	Season	Division	Apps	Goals	Apps	Goals	Apps	Goals
Stoke City	1935–36	First Division	25	0	5	0	30	0
Stoke City	1936–37	First Division	41	0	2	0	43	0
Stoke City	1937–38	First Division	41	0	2	0	43	0
Stoke City	1938–39	First Division	38	0	2	0	40	0
Stoke City	1948–49	First Division	1	0	0	0	1	0
Stoke City	1949–50	First Division	22	0	0	0	22	0
Stoke City	1950–51	First Division	5	0	1	0	6	0
Stoke City	1951–52	First Division	13	0	0	0	13	0
Career Total			186	0	12	0	198	0
