= Robert Dunkley =

Robert Dunkley may refer to:

- Robert Dunkley (footballer) (1922–2002), English footballer
- Robert Dunkley (sailor) (born 1949), Bahamian sailor
- Bob Dunkley, British sport shooter
