= 1948–49 Stoke City F.C. season =

Stoke City
1948–49 season
- Chairman: Mr H. Booth
- Manager: Bob McGrory
- Stadium: Victoria Ground
- Football League First Division: 11th (41 Points)
- FA Cup: Fifth Round
- Top goalscorer: League: Frank Bowyer (21); All: Frank Bowyer (21)
- Highest home attendance: 45,803 vs Manchester United (16 October 1948)
- Lowest home attendance: 15,949 vs Huddersfield Town (5 March 1949)
- Average home league attendance: 29,943
Home colours

The 1948–49 season was Stoke City's 42nd season in the Football League and the 28th in the First Division.

It proved to be another disappointing season for Stoke City, as several players began to express their dissatisfaction with manager Bob McGrory's stringent discipline. This discontent led to multiple players submitting transfer requests, which in turn began to impact the club's performance. The team's results on the field were inconsistent, culminating in a mid-table finish at 11th place.

== Season review ==
=== League ===
A strange feeling of disharmony set in at the Victoria Ground prior to the start of the 1948–49 season and Stoke received a number of transfer requests from players on the slightest whim. The previous season's main signings Jimmy McAlinden and Tommy Kiernan both departed after just a year with the club losing around £2,000 on the pair. The only other player whose wish to leave was accepted was Bert Mitchell. The 4 December 1948 was Stoke's red letter day as they fielded a team against Blackpool that cost a mere £10 and with all of them from the Stoke-on-Trent area. The only blotch on the claim however is that Frank Mountford was born in Doncaster but he moved to Stoke when he was about three years old.

A mid table position of 11th was all that Stoke could have expected from an inconsistent season with 16 wins and 17 defeats. One key point during the season was manager Bob McGrory's decision to employ Frank Bowyer as an out-and-out centre forward and he scored 21 goals. Surprisingly, when the campaign ended Bowyer asked for a transfer which was accepted but he soon had a change of heart and would remain at the club until 1960.

=== FA Cup ===
Stoke beat Swindon Town 3–1 in the third round before being drawn against Stanley Matthews' Blackpool. Stoke overcame the "Tangerines" 1–0 in a replay. Around 46,738 fans assembled to watch Stoke take on Third Division Hull City but much to the shock of the Stoke supporters, Hull won 2–0 on an awful Victoria Ground pitch.

== Final league table ==
Pos	Team	Pld	W	D	L	GF	GA	GAv	Pts
9	Charlton Athletic	42	15	12	15	63	67	0.940	42
10	Aston Villa	42	16	10	16	60	76	0.789	42
11	Stoke City	42	16	9	17	66	68	0.971	41
12	Liverpool	42	13	14	15	53	43	1.233	40
13	Chelsea	42	12	14	16	69	68	1.015	38

Source: World Football
Rules for classification: 1) Points; 2) Goal average; 3) Goals scored

== Results ==
Stoke's score comes first

=== Legend ===
Win	Draw	Loss

=== Football League First Division ===
Match	Date	Opponent	Venue	Result	Attendance	Scorers
1	21 August 1948	Charlton Athletic	H	2–2	29,975	Kiernan, F Mountford
2	25 August 1948	Arsenal	A	0–3	47,000	
3	28 August 1948	Manchester City	A	0–0	47,450	
4	30 August 1948	Arsenal	H	1–0	39,595	Steele
5	4 September 1948	Portsmouth	H	0–1	30,036	
6	8 September 1948	Everton	A	1–2	42,818	Bowyer
7	11 September 1948	Newcastle United	A	2–2	59,262	Bowyer, Steele
8	13 September 1948	Everton	H	1–0	25,404	Steele
9	18 September 1948	Middlesbrough	H	3–0	28,854	Steele, Bowyer (2)
10	25 September 1948	Birmingham City	A	1–2	49,800	Bowyer
11	2 October 1948	Chelsea	H	4–3	30,934	Bowyer, Steele (2), Baker
12	9 October 1948	Huddersfield Town	A	3–1	19,381	Bowyer, Baker, G Mountford
13	16 October 1948	Manchester United	H	2–1	45,830	G Mountford, Steele
14	23 October 1948	Sheffield United	A	2–2	29,374	G Mountford, Bowyer
15	30 October 1948	Aston Villa	H	4–2	37,200	G Mountford, Bowyer, Peppitt, Ashton (o.g.)
16	6 November 1948	Sunderland	A	1–1	41,871	Bowyer
17	13 November 1948	Wolverhampton Wanderers	H	2–1	37,111	Bowyer (2)
18	20 November 1948	Bolton Wanderers	A	1–2	40,000	Steele
19	27 November 1948	Liverpool	H	3–0	29,607	Steele, F Mountford, Bowyer
20	4 December 1948	Blackpool	A	1–2	30,000	Steele
21	11 December 1948	Derby County	H	4–2	38,802	Steele (2), F Mountford (pen), Ormston
22	18 December 1948	Charlton Athletic	A	1–4	32,000	Bowyer
23	25 December 1948	Burnley	A	3–1	39,000	Bowyer (3)
24	27 December 1948	Burnley	H	2–1	39,533	Steele (2)
25	1 January 1949	Manchester City	H	2–3	27,379	Steele, Bowyer
26	15 January 1949	Portsmouth	A	0–1	34,000	
27	22 January 1949	Newcastle United	H	1–1	39,377	Bowyer
28	19 February 1949	Birmingham City	H	2–1	25,892	Steele, Sellars
29	26 February 1949	Chelsea	A	2–2	39,652	Caton, G Mountford
30	5 March 1949	Huddersfield Town	H	1–3	15,595	Bowyer
31	12 March 1949	Manchester United	A	0–3	55,949	
32	19 March 1949	Bolton Wanderers	H	4–0	24,269	G Mountford (2), F Mountford, Hamlett (o.g.)
33	26 March 1949	Liverpool	A	0–4	30,797	
34	2 April 1949	Sunderland	H	0–0	21,989	
35	9 April 1949	Wolverhampton Wanderers	A	1–3	35,000	Steele
36	15 April 1949	Preston North End	A	1–2	37,000	Bowyer
37	16 April 1949	Sheffield United	H	0–1	22,556	
38	18 April 1949	Preston North End	H	2–0	22,185	Steele, Peppitt
39	23 April 1949	Aston Villa	A	1–2	40,000	Ormston
40	27 April 1949	Middlesbrough	A	1–1	40,226	Peppitt
41	30 April 1949	Blackpool	H	3–2	18,705	Peppitt, G Mountford, F Mountford (pen)
42	7 May 1949	Derby County	A	1–4	28,616	Peppitt

=== FA Cup ===
Round	Date	Opponent	Venue	Result	Attendance	Scorers
R3	8 January 1949	Swindon Town	A	3–1	26,335	Steele, G Mountford (2)
R4	29 January 1948	Blackpool	H	1–1	45,000	F Mountford
R4 Replay	5 February 1949	Blackpool	A	1–0	30,000	G Mountford
R5	12 February 1949	Hull City	H	0–2	46,738	

== Squad statistics ==
Pos.	Name	League		FA Cup		Total	
Pos.	Name	Apps	Goals	Apps	Goals	Apps	Goals
GK	(England) Dennis Herod	41	0	4	0	45	0
GK	(England) Norman Wilkinson	1	0	0	0	1	0
DF	(England) Neil Franklin	36	0	4	0	40	0
DF	(England) Eric Hampson	1	0	0	0	1	0
DF	(England) Roy Jones	5	0	0	0	5	0
DF	(United States) John Kirkby	1	0	0	0	1	0
DF	(England) John McCue	39	0	1	0	40	0
DF	(England) Harry Meakin	2	0	3	0	5	0
DF	(England) Billy Mould	25	0	0	0	25	0
DF	(England) Cyril Watkin	16	0	3	0	19	0
MF	(England) Roy Brown	2	0	0	0	2	0
MF	(Scotland) Jock Kirton	1	0	1	0	2	0
MF	(England) Frank Mountford	40	5	4	1	44	6
MF	(England) John Sellars	42	1	4	0	46	1
MF	(England) Edward Wordley	1	0	0	0	1	0
FW	(England) Frank Baker	17	2	0	0	17	2
FW	(England) Frank Bowyer	31	21	4	0	35	21
FW	(England) Bill Caton	10	1	0	0	10	1
FW	(Scotland) Tommy Kiernan	4	1	0	0	4	1
FW	Jimmy McAlinden	2	0	0	0	2	0
FW	(England) John Malkin	6	0	0	0	6	0
FW	(England) George Mountford	39	8	4	3	43	11
FW	(England) Alexander Ormston	42	2	4	0	46	2
FW	(England) Syd Peppitt	20	5	4	0	24	5
FW	(England) Freddie Steele	38	18	4	1	42	19
–	Own goals	–	2	–	0	–	2
