= Frank Baker (footballer) =

English footballer (1918-1989)

Personal information
- Full name: Frank Baker
- Date of birth: 22 October 1918
- Place of birth: Stoke-on-Trent, England
- Date of death: 10 December 1989 (aged 71)
- Place of death: Stoke-on-Trent, England
- Height: 5 ft 7 in (1.70 m)
- Position: Outside left

Senior career*
Years	Team	Apps	(Gls)
1935–1936	Port Vale	0	(0)
1936–1949	Stoke City	162	(32)
1949–1951	Stafford Rangers		
1951–1953	Leek Town		
- * Club domestic league appearances and goals

Frank Baker (22 October 1918 – 10 December 1989) was a footballer who played in the Football League for Stoke City. He made 174 appearances for Stoke, scoring 33 goals. His elder brother, Horace, also played professional football.

== Early and personal life ==
Frank Baker was born in Stoke-on-Trent as the son of a former Fenton Town player and four of his brothers also played football, including elder brother Horace.

== Career ==
Baker earned his living driving a laundry van whilst playing for Port Vale's reserves as an amateur. His performances for Vale's second string caught the attention of Wolverhampton Wanderers and on one evening manager Frank Buckley was due to travel to Vale to sign Baker. But Stoke City manager Bob McGrory caught wind of the potential transfer and arrived earlier and persuaded Baker to sign for Stoke instead. He spent the 1936–37 season in Stoke's reserves, making only the occasional first-team appearance due to England international Joe Johnson occupying the left-wing position. But he managed to get his chance one match into the 1937–38 season as Johnson injured his ankle and Baker took full advantage. He linked up well with his centre forward Freddie Steele, providing him with many crosses and he also chipped in with 12 goals and scored a further 10 in 1938–39. He was called up for army duty in 1939 and therefore played few matches for Stoke in the War League, although he did guest for Sunderland and Northern Irish club Linfield. He played for Stoke against Bolton Wanderers during the Burnden Park disaster on 9 March 1946, and broke down in tears on the final whistle.

When League football resumed in 1946–47, Baker had competition in the form of the hunchback Alexander Ormston. McGrory decided to move Baker to inside left to replace the retired Tommy Sale, and although his goalscoring suffered the pair formed one of the best left wing combinations in the country which nearly helped Stoke win the First Division title – the "Potters" their must win match against Sheffield United 2–1. Baker then suffered a crop of serious injuries which ended his career, in August 1947 he broke his arm against Liverpool and missed most of the 1947–48 season. He broke his leg against Manchester United in October 1948 and then fractured it again at Wolves five games into his comeback in April 1949. In all, Baker broke bones five times in two years. After spending a year in rehabilitation, he retired in the Summer of 1951 on doctors' advice. He then ran a fish and chips shop in Fenton for many years, coached Stoke's 'A' team and managed non-League Foley until he died in 1989 at the age of 71.

== Career statistics ==
Appearances and goals by club, season and competition
Club	Season	League			FA Cup		Total	
Club	Season	Division	Apps	Goals	Apps	Goals	Apps	Goals
Port Vale	1935–36	Second Division	0	0	0	0	0	0
Stoke City	1936–37	First Division	4	0	0	0	4	0
Stoke City	1937–38	First Division	41	11	3	1	44	12
Stoke City	1938–39	First Division	36	10	2	0	38	10
Stoke City	1945–46	First Division	0	0	2	0	2	0
Stoke City	1946–47	First Division	39	6	5	0	44	6
Stoke City	1947–48	First Division	14	3	0	0	14	3
Stoke City	1948–49	First Division	17	2	0	0	17	2
Stoke City	1949–50	First Division	11	0	0	0	11	0
Career total			162	32	12	1	174	33
