= Roy Jones (footballer) =

English footballer

Personal information
- Full name: Roy Jones
- Date of birth: 29 August 1924
- Place of birth: Stoke-on-Trent, England
- Date of death: 2005 (aged 81)
- Position: Defender

Senior career*
Years	Team	Apps	(Gls)
1947–1950	Stoke City	7	(0)
–	Stafford Rangers		
- * Club domestic league appearances and goals

Roy Jones (29 August 1924 – 2005), born Roy Shufflebottom, was an English footballer who played in the Football League for Stoke City.

== Career ==
Shufflebottom joined Stoke during World War II and eventually made his Football League debut in the 1947–48 season. In 1948 he changed his name by deed poll to Jones. He played a further six matches for Stoke until 1950 when he left and joined non-league Stafford Rangers.

== Career statistics ==
Club	Season	League			FA Cup		Total	
Club	Season	Division	Apps	Goals	Apps	Goals	Apps	Goals
Stoke City	1947–48	First Division	1	0	0	0	1	0
Stoke City	1948–49	First Division	5	0	0	0	5	0
Stoke City	1949–50	First Division	1	0	0	0	1	0
Career Total			7	0	0	0	7	0
