= Reginald Pickup =

English footballer

Personal information
- Full name: Reginald John Pickup
- Date of birth: 6 September 1929
- Place of birth: Stoke-on-Trent, England
- Date of death: 19 July 2018 (aged 88)
- Position: Inside left

Senior career*
Years	Team	Apps	(Gls)
–	Staffordshire Boy's Club		
1949–1950	Stoke City	1	(0)
–	Stafford Rangers		
- * Club domestic league appearances and goals

Reginald John Pickup (6 September 1929 – 19 July 2018) was an English footballer who played in the Football League for Stoke City.

== Career ==
Pickup was born in Stoke-on-Trent and played amateur football with the Staffordshire Boy's Club before joining Stoke in 1949. He played one match in the Football League which came in a 0–0 draw at home to Huddersfield Town during the 1949–50 season. He then joined non-league Stafford Rangers.

== Career statistics ==
Appearances and goals by club, season and competition
Club	Season	League			FA Cup		Total	
Club	Season	Division	Apps	Goals	Apps	Goals	Apps	Goals
Stoke City	1949–50	First Division	1	0	0	0	1	0
Career total			1	0	0	0	1	0
