= Edmund Giblin =

English footballer

Personal information
- Full name: Edmund John Giblin
- Date of birth: 29 June 1923
- Place of birth: Stoke-on-Trent, England
- Date of death: 28 January 2000 (aged 76)
- Place of death: Newcastle-under-Lyme, England
- Position: Left-half

Senior career*
Years	Team	Apps	(Gls)
1942–1946	Tunstall Boys Club		
1946–1947	Stoke City	1	(0)
1948	Stafford Rangers		
- * Club domestic league appearances and goals

Edmund John Giblin (29 June 1923 – 28 January 2000) was an English footballer who played in the Football League for Stoke City.

== Career ==
Foster played for Tunstall Boys' Club before joining Stoke during World War II. He made one appearance for Stoke in the Football League which came in a 2–0 defeat at home to Manchester United in February 1948. Afterwards he left the club for non-league Stafford Rangers.

== Career statistics ==
Appearances and goals by club, season and competition
Club	Season	League			FA Cup		Total	
Club	Season	Division	Apps	Goals	Apps	Goals	Apps	Goals
Stoke City	1947–48	First Division	1	0	0	0	1	0
Career Total			1	0	0	0	1	0
