= Arthur Jepson =

English cricketer & footballer (1915–1997)

Personal information
- Full name: Arthur Jepson
- Born: 12 July 1915; Selston, Nottinghamshire, England
- Died: 17 July 1997 (aged 82); Kirkby-in-Ashfield, Nottinghamshire, England
- Batting: Right-handed
- Bowling: Right-arm fast-medium
- Role: Bowler

Domestic team information
- Years: Team
- 1938–1959: Nottinghamshire

Umpiring information
- Tests umpired: 4 (1966–1969)
- ODIs umpired: 5 (1974–1976)

Career statistics
Competition	First-class
Matches	392
Runs scored	6,369
Batting average	14.31
100s/50s	1/11
Top score	130
Balls bowled	71,573
Wickets	1,051
Bowling average	29.08
5 wickets in innings	40
10 wickets in match	6
Best bowling	8/45
Catches/stumpings	200/–
- Source: CricketArchive, 15 August 2022

Arthur Jepson
Personal information
- Height: 5 ft 10 in (1.78 m)
- Position: Goalkeeper

Youth career
- 1933: Newark Town

Senior career*
Years	Team	Apps	(Gls)
1934–1935	Mansfield Town	2	(0)
1935–1938	Grantham Town		
1938–1946	Port Vale	39	(0)
1946–1948	Stoke City	28	(0)
1948–1950	Lincoln City	58	(0)
1950–1951	Northwich Victoria		
1951–1953	Gloucester City		
- Hinckley Athletic

Managerial career
- 1956–1957: Long Eaton United
- Hinckley Town
- Hinckley Athletic
- * Club domestic league appearances and goals

Arthur Jepson (12 July 1915 – 17 July 1997) was an English first-class cricketer who played for Nottinghamshire before becoming an umpire. In addition to cricket he was also an accomplished football goalkeeper who played over 100 games in the Football League before turning his hand to management.

A right-arm fast-medium bowler for Nottinghamshire between 1938 and 1959, Jepson took 1,050 first-class wickets, becoming one of the ten most prolific bowlers in the club's history. He then spent 26 years as an umpire, presiding over four Test matches.

In his footballing career, he played for non-League sides Newark Town, Mansfield Town, and Grantham Town, before playing for Port Vale either side of World War II. He spent 1946 to 1948 in the top flight with Stoke City before winding down his career following a two-year stint with Lincoln City. He later turned out for non-League sides Northwich Victoria and Gloucester City, and also briefly managed Long Eaton United and Hinckley United.

== Cricket career ==
Jepson, a right-arm fast-medium bowler, made his county debut as a 23-year-old in 1938. He had his best summer in 1947 when he took 115 wickets at 27.78, the only occasion when he took more than 100 wickets in a season. On the back of his prolific summer he represented the Marylebone Cricket Club twice the following year.

In a match against Leicestershire in 1958, his penultimate season, he took a career-best 8 for 45 to dismiss Leicestershire for 128 in their second innings. He brought up his 1,000th first-class wicket when he had first innings century-maker and captain Willie Watson caught by Norman Hill.

He batted mostly in the lower order and made a solitary century in his first-class career, an innings of 130 against Worcestershire at Trent Bridge when he shared in a sixth wicket partnership of 270 with opener Reg Simpson.

"Jepson was a doughty opponent with all-round skills that buttressed a Nottinghamshire team whose individual capabilities, for most of the early post-war years, were far superior to their teamwork."

— A line from his obituary in The Independent.

After retiring as a cricketer, Jepson turned to umpiring and officiated in county matches up until 1985. He umpired in the Gillette Cup and NatWest Trophy from 1963 to 1987. Jepson was umpire, along with Harold 'Dickie' Bird for the famous 1971 Gillette Cup Semi Final between Lancashire and Gloucestershire at Old Trafford. The game finished around 9pm having been delayed for around 90 minutes at lunch due to rain. It is believed Jepson made the call to keep the players on the field to finish the match. The BBC duty officer in London made a call just before 8.40pm not to show Points of View instead going live to the cricket and staying until the end delaying the BBC News which in those days was at 8.50pm.

Between 1966 and 1969, he umpired four Test matches, the first of which was between England and the West Indies at Nottingham, where Basil Butcher scored a double hundred. He also umpired in five One Day Internationals, including three at the 1975 Cricket World Cup; East Africa vs India, Sri Lanka vs West Indies, and Pakistan vs Sri Lanka.

== Football career ==
In football, Jepson was a goalkeeper; after leaving Newark Town, he played for Mansfield Town and then Grantham Town. In June 1938, he joined Port Vale and made his Third Division South debut in a 1–0 defeat at Clapton Orient on 8 September. He proved to be a more competent keeper than George Heppell. He was an ever-present at the Old Recreation Ground during the rest of the 1938–39 season despite problems with injury and gaining permission to play from Nottinghamshire County Cricket Club. Also a regular during the 1939–40 campaign, during the war he guested for Nottingham Forest, Watford, Notts County and Swansea Town. After his demobbing from the forces in October 1945, he was one of six pre-war Port Vale players who returned to Burslem, regaining his place in the side.

After suffering a serious spinal injury in February 1946, he missed the rest of the season. This time, he also missed the start of the 1946–47 season due to his cricketing commitments. In September 1946, having played 92 games for the Vale over all competitions, he was sold to local rivals Stoke City for a £3,750 fee, as Vale manager Billy Frith believed Heppell to be a superior goalkeeper. Stoke manager Bob McGrory used Jepson in 31 games in 1946–47, ahead of rivals Dennis Herod and Emmanuel Foster, as the "Potters" recorded a fourth-place finish in the First Division – a club record finish that still stands. However, Jepson made just one appearance in 1947–48, with Herod being the preferred stopper.

After two seasons at the Victoria Ground, he moved on to newly-promoted Second Division side Lincoln City in 1948. He kept goal for Bill Anderson's side in 58 league games, as the "Imps" were relegated in last place in 1948–49, only missing out on promotion out of the Third Division North by four points in 1949–50. Leaving Sincil Bank in 1950, he later played for non-League sides Northwich Victoria and Gloucester City before becoming the first manager of Long Eaton United in June 1956, before he departed in March 1957 after 15 wins in 29 games. He later managed Hinckley Town and Hinckley Athletic and scout for Coventry City and Middlesbrough.

== Personal life ==
Jepson had one son and one daughter, and in later life, he helped his son (a golf professional) manage a sports equipment shop near the family home at Kirkby-in-Ashfield.

== Career statistics ==
Appearances and goals by club, season and competition
Club	Season	League			FA Cup		Other		Total	
Club	Season	Division	Apps	Goals	Apps	Goals	Apps	Goals	Apps	Goals
Mansfield Town	1934–35	Third Division North	2	0	1	0	0	0	3	0
Port Vale	1938–39	Third Division South	39	0	2	0	4	0	45	0
Port Vale	1939–40	–	0	0	0	0	2	0	2	0
Port Vale	1945–46	–	0	0	6	0	0	0	6	0
Port Vale	Total		39	0	8	0	6	0	53	0
Stoke City	1946–47	First Division	27	0	4	0	0	0	31	0
Stoke City	1947–48	First Division	1	0	0	0	0	0	1	0
Stoke City	Total		28	0	4	0	0	0	32	0
Lincoln City	1948–49	Second Division	21	0	1	0	0	0	22	0
Lincoln City	1949–50	Third Division North	37	0	1	0	0	0	38	0
Lincoln City	Total		58	0	2	0	0	0	60	0
Career total			127	0	15	0	6	0	148	0

== See also ==
- List of Test cricket umpires
- List of One Day International cricket umpires
