= Harry Meakin =

English footballer

Personal information
- Full name: Harry Meakin
- Date of birth: 8 September 1919
- Place of birth: Stoke-on-Trent, England
- Date of death: 1986 (aged 67)
- Place of death: Chester, England
- Position: Full-back

Senior career*
Years	Team	Apps	(Gls)
1945	Summerbank		
1946–1950	Stoke City	35	(0)
1950	Northwich Victoria		
- * Club domestic league appearances and goals

Harry Meakin (8 September 1919 – 1986) was an English footballer who played in the Football League for Stoke City.

== Career ==
Meakin was born in Stoke-on-Trent and joined Stoke City from local feeder club Summerbank during World War II. He was signed as a backup defender but found himself playing as a regular in 1947–48 after injury to key defender Neil Franklin. Afterwards he reverted to his bit part role and left for Northwich Victoria in 1950.

== Career statistics ==
Appearances and goals by club, season and competition
Club	Season	League			FA Cup		Total	
Club	Season	Division	Apps	Goals	Apps	Goals	Apps	Goals
Stoke City	1946–47	First Division	6	0	0	0	6	0
Stoke City	1947–48	First Division	22	0	2	0	24	0
Stoke City	1948–49	First Division	2	0	3	0	5	0
Stoke City	1949–50	First Division	5	0	1	0	6	0
Career total			35	0	6	0	41	0
