= 1946–47 Stoke City F.C. season =

Stoke City
1946–47 season
- Chairman: Mr H. Booth
- Manager: Bob McGrory
- Stadium: Victoria Ground
- Football League First Division: 4th (55 Points)
- FA Cup: Fifth Round
- Top goalscorer: League: Freddie Steele (29); All: Freddie Steele (31)
- Highest home attendance: 45,000 vs Wolverhampton Wanderers (26 October 1946)
- Lowest home attendance: 23,450 vs Bolton Wanderers (2 September 1946)
- Average home league attendance: 30,863
Home colours

The 1946–47 season was Stoke City's 40th season in the Football League and the 26th in the First Division.

After a seven-year absence due to World War II, the Football League made a welcome return for the 1946–47 season. Stoke were boosted by their time in the war leagues where they used many younger players to speed up their development. So Stoke now with a squad full of talent went on to achieve the finest league season in the club's history as they were involved in their first real attempt at winning the English title. The season was expanded until June due to a poor winter weather wise and on the final day of the season Stoke needed to beat Sheffield United to claim their first league title, but with the unhappy Stanley Matthews now moved on to Blackpool, Stoke lost 2–1 and ended up in 4th position. The 1946–47 season finish of 4th is only matched by the performance by the Stoke team of the 1935–36 season.

== Season review ==
=== League ===
After a seven-year break the Football League returned for the 1946–47 season. Stoke, relying on many of their wartime discoveries along with quite a few who had served the club before the war commenced, were confident of doing well, and manager Bob McGrory announced that his squad consisted of 45 players (19 of them were amateurs) of which 22 were eventually used. As the season took its course a number of players were sold for a profit and the only signing McGrory made was that of 31 years old goalkeeper Arthur Jepson. McGrory indicated that with full-time training, his side would thrive and given the right coaching and facilities in which to train and reach peak fitness. And he was proved right, despite the team picking up one point in their first four matches, the side started to play as a unit and thanks to two unbeaten runs, a challenge was made for top spot.

By October the saga involving Stanley Matthews and McGrory reared its ugly head again this time after the manager had asked the England winger to 'prove his fitness' in the reserves. Matthews now living in Blackpool refused and he drifted in and out of the squad following the fall out. One of the worst winters of the 20th century gripped Britain in 1947 and consequently the football season was extended into June and indeed it was late in the season when Stanley Matthews again asked to leave. He was 32, and running his own hotel with his wife in Blackpool, and he named the club he wanted to join unsurprisingly it was the Bloomfield Road club Blackpool. Matthews was worried that his career had only four years left and wanted to end it near his business. Matthews' career would however continue for another 20 years.

The 1946–47 season came to a climax in mid June when Stoke visited Sheffield United. A victory at Bramall Lane would give Stoke the league title, anything less would hand the honour to Liverpool. Stoke took around 10,000 of their fans to Sheffield but it was the "Blades" who proved to be too sharp for Stoke as they scored twice and despite Alexander Ormston replying for Stoke the title bid was over. Stoke were awarded £110 'talent money' for their performance during the season.

=== FA Cup ===
Stoke beat Tottenham Hotspur and Chester both after replays before meeting Sheffield United who again proved be their bogey side winning 1–0 in front of 39,683 at the Victoria Ground.

== Final league table ==
Pos	Team	Pld	W	D	L	GF	GA	GAv	Pts
2	Manchester United	42	22	12	8	95	54	1.759	56
3	Wolverhampton Wanderers	42	25	6	11	98	56	1.750	56
4	Stoke City	42	24	7	11	90	53	1.698	55
5	Blackpool	42	22	6	14	71	70	1.014	50
6	Sheffield United	42	21	7	14	89	75	1.187	49

Source: World Football
Rules for classification: 1) Points; 2) Goal average; 3) Goals scored

== Results ==
Stoke's score comes first

=== Legend ===
Win	Draw	Loss

=== Football League First Division ===
Match	Date	Opponent	Venue	Result	Attendance	Scorers
1	31 August 1946	Charlton Athletic	H	2–2	31,846	Steele, Ormston
2	2 September 1946	Bolton Wanderers	H	1–2	23,450	Steele
3	7 September 1946	Middlesbrough	A	4–5	45,000	Steele (3), Mountford
4	11 September 1946	Bolton Wanderers	A	2–3	25,300	Ormston, Mountford
5	14 September 1946	Derby County	H	3–2	35,000	Ormston, Mountford, Steele
6	16 September 1946	Leeds United	H	5–2	25,000	Ormston, Antonio (2), Steele (2)
7	21 September 1946	Manchester United	H	3–2	40,000	Antonio, Steele (2)
8	28 September 1946	Preston North End	A	3–1	25,000	Antonio, Steele, Ormston
9	5 October 1946	Sheffield United	H	3–0	29,146	Steele (3)
10	12 October 1946	Chelsea	A	5–2	68,189	Steele, Ormston (3), Kirton
11	19 October 1946	Arsenal	A	0–1	62,000	
12	26 October 1946	Wolverhampton Wanderers	H	0–3	45,000	
13	2 November 1946	Sunderland	A	1–0	53,000	Baker
14	9 November 1946	Aston Villa	H	0–0	35,000	
15	16 November 1946	Portsmouth	A	3–1	38,000	Steele, Ormston, Peppitt
16	23 November 1946	Everton	H	2–1	27,798	Matthews, Antonio
17	30 November 1946	Huddersfield Town	A	0–1	26,767	
18	7 December 1946	Blackpool	H	4–1	30,000	Steele, Peppitt, Baker, Matthews
19	14 December 1946	Brentford	A	4–1	29,172	Peppitt (3), Ormston
20	21 December 1946	Blackburn Rovers	H	0–0	23,518	
21	25 December 1946	Liverpool	H	2–1	30,518	Steele (2)
22	26 December 1946	Liverpool	A	0–2	49,494	
23	28 December 1946	Charlton Athletic	A	0–1	36,388	
24	4 January 1947	Middlesbrough	H	3–1	33,986	Peppitt, Mitchell (2)
25	18 January 1947	Derby County	A	0–3	31,156	
26	1 February 1947	Preston North End	H	5–0	30,000	Peppitt (2), Steele (2), Ormston
27	5 February 1947	Manchester United	A	1–1	8,456	Ormston (pen)
28	15 February 1947	Chelsea	H	6–1	30,469	Ormston (2), Peppitt (2), Baker, Sellars
29	22 February 1947	Arsenal	H	3–1	31,642	Baker, Sellars, Jackson
30	1 March 1947	Wolverhampton Wanderers	A	0–3	45,000	
31	22 March 1947	Portsmouth	H	1–1	27,708	Steele
32	29 March 1947	Everton	A	2–2	40,092	Peppitt, Baker
33	4 April 1947	Grimsby Town	A	5–2	20,000	Peppitt, Steele (3), Ormston (pen)
34	5 April 1947	Huddersfield Town	H	3–0	28,966	Steele, Ormston, Baker
35	7 April 1947	Grimsby Town	H	3–0	34,269	Ormston, Jackson (2)
36	12 April 1947	Blackpool	A	2–0	30,000	Ormston (pen), Mountford
37	19 April 1947	Brentford	H	3–1	25,000	Steele, Mountford, Matthews
38	26 April 1947	Blackburn Rovers	A	2–0	26,300	Matthews, Ormston
39	3 May 1947	Leeds United	A	2–1	20,000	Steele (2)
40	17 May 1947	Sunderland	H	0–0	32,000	
41	26 May 1947	Aston Villa	A	1–0	42,000	Mountford
42	12 June 1947	Sheffield United	A	1–2	30,000	Ormston

=== FA Cup ===
Round	Date	Opponent	Venue	Result	Attendance	Scorers
R3	11 January 1947	Tottenham Hotspur	A	2–2	65,681	F Mountford, Ludford (o.g.)
R3 Replay	15 January 1947	Tottenham Hotspur	H	1–0	38,830	Matthews
R4	25 January 1947	Chester	A	0–0	18,500	
R4 Replay	29 January 1947	Chester	H	3–2	22,863	Steele (2), Ormston
R5	8 February 1947	Sheffield United	H	0–1	39,683	

== Squad statistics ==
Pos.	Name	League		FA Cup		Total	
Pos.	Name	Apps	Goals	Apps	Goals	Apps	Goals
GK	(England) Emmanuel Foster	1	0	0	0	1	0
GK	(England) Dennis Herod	14	0	1	0	15	0
GK	(England) Arthur Jepson	27	0	4	0	31	0
DF	(England) Harry Brigham	12	0	0	0	12	0
DF	(England) Neil Franklin	37	0	5	0	42	0
DF	(England) John McCue	36	0	5	0	41	0
DF	(England) Harry Meakin	6	0	0	0	6	0
DF	(England) Billy Mould	30	0	5	0	35	0
MF	(England) Roy Brown	4	0	0	0	4	0
MF	(Scotland) Jock Kirton	37	1	5	0	42	1
MF	(England) Frank Mountford	26	0	4	1	30	1
MF	(England) John Sellars	17	2	1	0	18	2
MF	(England) Edward Wordley	5	0	0	0	5	0
FW	(England) George Antonio	16	5	0	0	16	5
FW	(England) Frank Baker	39	6	5	0	44	6
FW	(England) John Jackson	3	3	0	0	3	3
FW	(England) Stanley Matthews	23	4	5	1	28	5
FW	(England) Bert Mitchell	4	2	0	0	4	2
FW	(England) George Mountford	23	6	0	0	23	6
FW	(England) Alexander Ormston	40	20	5	1	45	21
FW	(England) Syd Peppitt	24	12	5	0	29	12
FW	(England) Freddie Steele	38	29	5	2	43	31
–	Own goals	–	0	–	1	–	1
