= 1947–48 Stoke City F.C. season =

Stoke City
1947–48 season
- Chairman: Mr H. Booth
- Manager: Bob McGrory
- Stadium: Victoria Ground
- Football League First Division: 15th (38 Points)
- FA Cup: Fourth Round
- Top goalscorer: League: Freddie Steele (10); All: Freddie Steele (12)
- Highest home attendance: 47,609 vs Blackpool (27 December 1947)
- Lowest home attendance: 19,478 vs Derby County (1 May 1948)
- Average home league attendance: 31,590
Home colours

The 1947–48 season was Stoke City's 41st season in the Football League and the 27th in the First Division.

After narrowly missing out on their first league title last season there was a huge weight of expectation for the Stoke squad of 1947–48. But great misfortune was the story of the season as six key players suffered long term injuries all in September. The side battled on with inexperienced youngsters having to fill the gaps and relegation was a distinct possibility but they managed to recover and finish in 15th position.

== Season review ==
=== League ===
Manager Bob McGrory, ambitious and anxious now to build on last season success, twice broke the club's record transfer in the Summer of 1947 when he brought in forwards Jimmy McAlinden from Portsmouth and Tommy Kiernan from Celtic for fees of £7,000 and £8,500 respectively. These two new players on top of the best from last season looked good for Stoke in the 1947–48 season as not many teams in the country could boast such an exciting young squad as Stoke's.

Unfortunately, an appalling catalogue of injuries soon made it obvious that the fans would see no repeat of the form showed from last season. By mid-September six of Stoke's key players, Jock Kirton, Neil Franklin, Frank Baker, George Mountford, Frank Mountford and Freddie Steele, all suffered major injuries which ruled them out for most of the season. The team battled on though, and in the end took 15th place in the table, having spent quite some time in the bottom three, relegation was a distinct possibility. Only six teams conceded fewer goals than Stoke but it was in attack where the problems lay, Stoke's goal threat completely drying up with Stoke scoring 90 goals last season and just 41 this season. Yet despite the frustrating anti-climax for the Stoke public the average home gate rose again this time to 31,590.

=== FA Cup ===
There was no joy in the cup for Stoke fans as a 4–2 victory over Mansfield Town was followed by a 3–0 reverse against Third Division Queens Park Rangers.

== Final league table ==
Pos	Team	Pld	W	D	L	GF	GA	GAv	Pts
13	Charlton Athletic	42	17	6	19	57	66	0.864	40
14	Everton	42	17	6	19	52	66	0.788	40
15	Stoke City	42	14	10	18	41	55	0.745	38
16	Middlesbrough	42	14	9	19	71	73	0.973	37
17	Bolton Wanderers	42	16	5	21	46	58	0.793	37

Source: World Football
Rules for classification: 1) Points; 2) Goal average; 3) Goals scored

== Results ==
Stoke's score comes first

=== Legend ===
Win	Draw	Loss

=== Football League First Division ===
Match	Date	Opponent	Venue	Result	Attendance	Scorers
1	23 August 1947	Bolton Wanderers	A	1–0	25,000	Steele
2	25 August 1947	Portsmouth	H	2–1	30,106	Steele, Ormston
3	30 August 1947	Liverpool	H	0–2	37,408	
4	3 September 1947	Portsmouth	A	0–3	30,053	
5	6 September 1947	Middlesbrough	A	1–2	38,000	Ormston
6	8 September 1947	Preston North End	H	0–1	26,764	
7	13 September 1947	Charlton Athletic	H	0–1	30,027	
8	17 September 1947	Preston North End	A	1–2	25,114	Ormston
9	20 September 1947	Arsenal	A	0–3	62,000	
10	27 September 1947	Sheffield United	H	1–1	39,965	Peppitt
11	4 October 1947	Manchester United	A	1–1	45,745	Kiernan
12	11 October 1947	Blackburn Rovers	H	2–1	33,912	G Mountford, F Mountford
13	18 October 1947	Manchester City	A	0–3	42,401	
14	25 October 1947	Grimsby Town	H	2–1	29,944	Sellars, Kiernan
15	1 November 1947	Sunderland	A	0–1	36,734	
16	8 November 1947	Everton	H	1–1	32,246	G Mountford
17	15 November 1947	Chelsea	A	1–4	41,618	Caton
18	22 November 1947	Aston Villa	H	1–2	31,891	McAlinden
19	29 November 1947	Wolverhampton Wanderers	A	2–1	32,000	G Mountford, Ormston
20	6 December 1947	Huddersfield Town	H	1–1	24,451	McAlinden
21	13 December 1947	Derby County	A	1–1	24,812	Kiernan
22	20 December 1947	Bolton Wanderers	H	2–0	23,404	Steele, Sellars
23	25 December 1947	Blackpool	A	2–1	26,613	Steele (2)
24	27 December 1947	Blackpool	H	1–1	47,609	Kiernan
25	3 January 1948	Liverpool	A	0–0	48,665	
26	17 January 1948	Middlesbrough	H	2–4	24,990	Steele (2)
27	31 January 1948	Charlton Athletic	A	1–0	32,102	Ormston
28	7 February 1948	Arsenal	H	0–0	45,000	
29	14 February 1948	Sheffield United	A	0–3	30,178	
30	21 February 1948	Manchester United	H	0–2	36,794	
31	28 February 1948	Blackburn Rovers	A	0–2	24,000	
32	6 March 1948	Manchester City	H	3–0	30,243	Steele (2), Baker
33	13 March 1948	Grimsby Town	A	0–0	9,000	
34	20 March 1948	Sunderland	H	3–1	26,750	Steele, Kiernan, Peppitt
35	26 March 1948	Burnley	A	0–4	27,000	
36	27 March 1948	Everton	A	1–0	44,241	G Mountford
37	29 March 1948	Burnley	H	3–0	32,459	Peppitt (3)
38	2 April 1948	Chelsea	H	2–0	28,040	G Mountford, Malkin
39	10 April 1948	Aston Villa	A	0–1	30,000	
40	17 April 1948	Wolverhampton Wanderers	H	2–3	24,512	Baker (2)
41	24 April 1948	Huddersfield Town	A	0–0	15,000	
42	1 May 1948	Derby County	H	1–0	19,478	F Mountford (pen)

=== FA Cup ===
Round	Date	Opponent	Venue	Result	Attendance	Scorers
R3	10 January 1948	Mansfield Town	A	4–2	10,500	Sellars, Kiernan, Steele (2)
R4	24 January 1948	Queens Park Rangers	A	0–3	24,100	

== Squad statistics ==
Pos.	Name	League		FA Cup		Total	
Pos.	Name	Apps	Goals	Apps	Goals	Apps	Goals
GK	(England) Dennis Herod	41	0	2	0	43	0
GK	(England) Arthur Jepson	1	0	0	0	1	0
DF	(England) Neil Franklin	35	0	2	0	37	0
DF	(England) Roy Jones	1	0	0	0	1	0
DF	(England) John McCue	23	0	0	0	23	0
DF	(England) Harry Meakin	22	0	2	0	24	0
DF	(England) Billy Mould	40	0	2	0	42	0
MF	(England) Roy Brown	7	0	0	0	7	0
MF	(England) Edmund Giblin	1	0	0	0	1	0
MF	(Scotland) Jock Kirton	26	0	2	0	28	0
MF	(England) Frank Mountford	35	2	2	0	37	2
MF	(England) John Sellars	31	2	2	1	33	3
MF	(England) Edward Wordley	3	0	0	0	3	0
FW	(England) Frank Baker	14	3	0	0	14	3
FW	(England) Frank Bowyer	1	0	0	0	1	0
FW	(England) Bill Caton	3	1	0	0	3	1
FW	(England) John Jackson	1	0	0	0	1	0
FW	(Scotland) Tommy Kiernan	24	5	2	1	26	6
FW	(England) John Malkin	5	1	0	0	5	1
FW	Jimmy McAlinden	31	2	2	0	33	2
FW	(England) Bert Mitchell	6	0	0	0	6	0
FW	(England) George Mountford	29	5	0	0	29	5
FW	(England) Alexander Ormston	33	5	2	0	35	5
FW	(England) Syd Peppitt	28	5	0	0	28	5
FW	(England) Freddie Steele	21	10	2	2	23	12
