= Tommy Kiernan =

Scottish footballer (1918–1991)

Thomas Kiernan
Personal information
- Full name: Thomas Kiernan
- Date of birth: 20 October 1918
- Place of birth: Coatbridge, Scotland
- Date of death: 26 June 1991 (aged 72)
- Place of death: Coatbridge, Scotland
- Position: Inside forward

Youth career
- Viewpark Celtic
- 1936–1937: Clydebank Juniors

Senior career*
| Years | Team | Apps | (Gls) |
| 1937–1945 | Albion Rovers | 44 | (24) |
| 1946–1947 | Celtic | 23 | (12) |
| 1947–1948 | Stoke City | 28 | (6) |
| 1948–1950 | Luton Town | 55 | (10) |
| 1950–1951 | St Mirren | 8 | (1) |
| 1951–1952 | Barry Town | | |
| 1952–1954 | Albion Rovers | 33 | (3) |
| 1954–1955 | Alloa Athletic | 29 | (8) |
| Total | | 205 | (53) |

International career
| 1947 | Scottish Football League XI | 1 | (0) |
- * Club domestic league appearances and goals

Thomas Kiernan (20 October 1918 – 26 June 1991) was a Scottish footballer who played in the Football League for Luton Town and Stoke City. He also played for Albion Rovers, Alloa Athletic and Celtic.

== Career ==
Kiernan was born in Coatbridge and began his career with Clydebank Juniors in 1936 before joining Albion Rovers a year later. He scored 24 goals for the Wee Rovers in two seasons prior to the outbreak of World War II and earned a move to Celtic after the war ended, where he spent one season before he was signed by English club Stoke City for a then club record fee of £8,500. He was a regular at inside right under the management of Bob McGrory in 1947–48 playing in 26 matches scoring six goals as Stoke a frustrating season finishing in 15th position. After playing just four matches at the start of 1948–49 Kiernan was then sold to Second Division Luton Town in November 1948 for £6,000. With the "Hatters" Kiernan played in three seasons scoring 15 goals in 60 matches before he returned to Scotland in 1950 with St Mirren. After a brief spell in Wales with Barry Town and made a return to Albion Rovers and ended his career with Alloa Athletic.

== Career statistics ==
Appearances and goals by club, season and competition
| Club | Season | League | | | FA Cup | | League Cup | | Total | |
| Club | Season | Division | Apps | Goals | Apps | Goals | Apps | Goals | Apps | Goals |
|---|---|---|---|---|---|---|---|---|---|---|
| Celtic | 1946–47 | Scottish Division One | 22 | 12 | 1 | 0 | 6 | 5 | 29 | 17 |
| Celtic | 1947–48 | Scottish Division One | 1 | 1 | 0 | 0 | 2 | 0 | 3 | 1 |
| Celtic | Total | | 23 | 13 | 1 | 0 | 8 | 5 | 32 | 18 |
| Stoke City | 1947–48 | First Division | 24 | 5 | 2 | 1 | — | | 26 | 6 |
| Stoke City | 1948–49 | First Division | 4 | 1 | 0 | 0 | — | | 4 | 1 |
| Stoke City | Total | | 28 | 6 | 2 | 1 | — | | 30 | 7 |
| Luton Town | 1948–49 | Second Division | 23 | 5 | 4 | 3 | — | | 27 | 8 |
| Luton Town | 1949–50 | Second Division | 24 | 4 | 1 | 2 | — | | 25 | 6 |
| Luton Town | 1950–51 | Second Division | 8 | 1 | 0 | 0 | — | | 8 | 1 |
| Luton Town | Total | | 55 | 10 | 5 | 5 | — | | 60 | 15 |
| Career total | | | 106 | 29 | 8 | 6 | 8 | 5 | 122 | 40 |
