= Bill Barker (footballer) =

English footballer

Personal information
- Full name: William Barker
- Date of birth: 31 May 1924
- Place of birth: Stoke-on-Trent, England
- Date of death: 2002 (aged 78)
- Position: Forward

Senior career*
| Years | Team | Apps | (Gls) |
| 1949 | Stoke City | 1 | (0) |
- * Club domestic league appearances and goals

William Barker (31 May 1924 – 2002) was an English footballer who played in the Football League for Stoke City.

== Career ==
Barker played for Stoke City and made one appearance for Stoke in the Football League which came in a 1–1 draw away at Manchester City during the 1949–50 season. He failed to make the grade at Stoke and decided to pursue a different career.

== Career statistics ==
Appearances and goals by club, season and competition
| Club | Season | League | | | FA Cup | | Total | |
| Club | Season | Division | Apps | Goals | Apps | Goals | Apps | Goals |
|---|---|---|---|---|---|---|---|---|
| Stoke City | 1949–50 | First Division | 1 | 0 | 0 | 0 | 1 | 0 |
| Career total | | | 1 | 0 | 0 | 0 | 1 | 0 |
