= 1949–50 Stoke City F.C. season =

Stoke City
1949–50 season
- Chairman: Mr H. Booth
- Manager: Bob McGrory
- Stadium: Victoria Ground
- Football League First Division: 19th (34 Points)
- FA Cup: Third Round
- Top goalscorer: League: Frank Bowyer (15); All: Frank Bowyer (15)
- Highest home attendance: 41,635 vs Sunderland (27 December 1949)
- Lowest home attendance: 17,297 vs Middlesbrough (3 December 1949)
- Average home league attendance: 27,215
Home colours

The 1949–50 season was Stoke City's 43rd season in the Football League and the 29th in the First Division.

In June 1949, Stoke legend Freddie Steele left after 17 years with the club, scoring 159 goals. Stoke failed to find a suitable replacement, struggled throughout the season and ended up in a relegation battle. There was no end of season improvement in results and Stoke only stayed up due to the poor form of the relegated bottom two Birmingham City and Manchester City.

== Season review ==
=== League ===
With Freddie Steele now moved on to Mansfield Town, the simmering unrest continued with Neil Franklin eager to move his family away from the Stoke-on-Trent area for health reasons. The local air at this time was far from clean due to the pottery industry at its peak and with kilns belching out smoke and fumes. With Steele gone manager Bob McGrory searched for a replacement and went out and spent £3,000 on Verdi Godwin from Manchester City, hoping that he would help the club find their goalscoring touch.

Franklin re-signed for the club in time for the 1949–50 season and his presence bolstered the defence whilst the forward line was struggling. By the end of October Stoke had just two wins to their name and were in deep relegation trouble so McGrory smashed the club's transfer record by paying £9,000 to Celtic for Leslie Johnston. However whilst Johnston was a fine footballer in Scotland he was not really up to the standard in English football and although he scored 22 goals in 92 games he was not the right player for the number 9 shirt. On 15 October Frank Baker broke his leg for the fifth time in two years and he decided to retire.

By January, there had been a modest improvement in performances out on the pitch and McGrory made his best signing for some time, persuading Freddie Steele who was now player-manager at Mansfield to part with young up and coming forward Harry Oscroft, Stoke handing over £8,000 plus Verdi Godwin who scored just twice in 23 matches. Soon after Oscroft's arrival, Stoke's defence started to leak goals and FA Cup finalists Arsenal put six past them at Highbury without a Stoke reply. Stoke managed just three points from their remaining eight matches this season and narrowly avoided relegation.

=== FA Cup ===
47,000 fans saw Stoke's cup run end at the third round losing 1–0 at home to Second Division Tottenham Hotspur.

== Final league table ==
Pos	Team	Pld	W	D	L	GF	GA	GAv	Pts	Relegation
17	Fulham	42	10	14	18	41	54	0.759	34	
18	Everton	42	10	14	18	42	66	0.636	34	
19	Stoke City	42	11	12	19	45	75	0.600	34	
20	Charlton Athletic	42	13	6	23	53	65	0.815	32	
21	Manchester City (R)	42	8	13	21	36	68	0.529	29	Relegation to the Second Division

Source: World Football
Rules for classification: 1) Points; 2) Goal average; 3) Goals scored
(R) Relegated

== Results ==
Stoke's score comes first

=== Legend ===
Win	Draw	Loss

=== Football League First Division ===
Match	Date	Opponent	Venue	Result	Attendance	Scorers
1	20 August 1949	Bolton Wanderers	A	0–4	29,333	
2	22 August 1949	Liverpool	H	0–0	27,205	
3	27 August 1949	Birmingham City	H	3–1	28,069	Bowyer (2), Godwin
4	31 August 1949	Liverpool	A	1–1	38,097	Bowyer
5	3 September 1949	Derby County	A	3–2	29,305	Bowyer, Sellars, Kirton
6	5 September 1949	Burnley	A	1–2	25,062	Bowyer
7	10 September 1949	West Bromwich Albion	H	1–3	36,815	G Mountford
8	12 September 1949	Burnley	H	1–1	25,077	Bowyer
9	17 September 1949	Manchester United	A	2–2	42,614	F Mountford (pen), Godwin
10	24 September 1949	Chelsea	H	2–3	28,650	G Mountford, F Mountford (pen)
11	1 October 1949	Newcastle United	A	1–4	49,903	Bowyer
12	8 October 1949	Fulham	H	0–2	24,904	
13	15 October 1949	Manchester City	A	1–1	31,151	F Mountford (pen)
14	22 October 1949	Charlton Athletic	H	0–3	20,740	
15	29 October 1949	Aston Villa	A	1–1	30,000	Sellars
16	5 November 1949	Wolverhampton Wanderers	H	2–1	40,111	Sellars, F Mountford (pen)
17	12 November 1949	Portsmouth	A	0–0	33,257	
18	19 November 1949	Huddersfield Town	H	0–0	20,038	
19	26 November 1949	Everton	A	1–2	30,000	Peppitt
20	3 December 1949	Middlesbrough	H	1–0	17,297	Bowyer
21	10 December 1949	Blackpool	A	2–4	17,000	Peppitt, Johnston
22	17 December 1949	Bolton Wanderers	H	3–2	19,023	Johnston, Bowyer (2)
23	24 December 1949	Birmingham City	A	0–1	20,000	
24	26 December 1949	Sunderland	A	0–3	50,246	
25	27 December 1949	Sunderland	H	2–1	41,635	Bowyer, F Mountford (pen)
26	31 December 1949	Derby County	H	1–3	25,989	Whiston
27	14 January 1950	West Bromwich Albion	A	0–0	34,840	
28	21 January 1950	Manchester United	H	3–1	38,901	G Mountford (2), Bowyer
29	4 February 1950	Chelsea	A	2–2	45,097	Johnston (2)
30	18 February 1950	Newcastle United	H	1–0	31,399	Oscroft
31	25 February 1950	Fulham	A	2–2	30,000	G Mountford, Bowyer
32	4 March 1950	Manchester City	H	2–0	29,986	G Mountford, Bowyer
33	11 March 1950	Huddersfield Town	A	0–4	18,702	
34	18 March 1950	Everton	H	1–0	22,125	Bowyer
35	25 March 1950	Wolverhampton Wanderers	A	1–2	38,388	Whiston
36	1 April 1950	Portsmouth	H	0–1	26,456	
37	8 April 1950	Charlton Athletic	A	0–2	28,000	
38	10 April 1950	Arsenal	A	0–6	30,064	
39	15 April 1950	Aston Villa	H	1–0	20,590	Meakin
40	22 April 1950	Middlesbrough	A	0–2	32,000	
41	29 April 1950	Blackpool	H	1–1	17,797	Johnston
42	6 May 1950	Arsenal	H	2–5	22,225	Oscroft (2)

=== FA Cup ===
Round	Date	Opponent	Venue	Result	Attendance	Scorers
R3	7 January 1950	Tottenham Hotspur	H	0–1	47,000	

== Squad statistics ==
Pos.	Name	League		FA Cup		Total	
Pos.	Name	Apps	Goals	Apps	Goals	Apps	Goals
GK	(England) Dennis Herod	20	0	1	0	21	0
GK	(England) Norman Wilkinson	22	0	0	0	22	0
DF	(England) Neil Franklin	34	0	1	0	35	0
DF	(England) Eric Hampson	1	0	0	0	1	0
DF	(England) Roy Jones	1	0	0	0	1	0
DF	(England) John McCue	35	0	0	0	35	0
DF	(England) Harry Meakin	5	0	1	0	6	0
DF	(England) Billy Mould	7	0	0	0	7	0
DF	(England) Cyril Watkin	37	0	1	0	38	0
MF	(England) Roy Brown	0	0	1	0	1	0
MF	(Scotland) Jock Kirton	15	1	0	0	15	1
MF	(England) Frank Mountford	37	5	0	0	37	5
MF	(England) John Sellars	40	3	1	0	41	3
MF	(England) Edward Wordley	1	0	0	0	1	0
MF	(England) Donald Whiston	4	2	1	0	5	2
FW	(England) Frank Baker	11	0	0	0	11	0
FW	(England) Bill Barker	1	0	0	0	1	0
FW	(England) Frank Bowyer	42	15	1	0	43	15
FW	(England) Bill Caton	9	0	0	0	9	0
FW	(England) Verdi Godwin	22	2	1	0	23	2
FW	(Scotland) Leslie Johnston	27	5	1	0	28	5
FW	(England) John Malkin	28	1	1	0	29	1
FW	(England) George Mountford	32	6	0	0	32	6
FW	(England) Alexander Ormston	5	0	0	0	5	0
FW	(England) Harry Oscroft	16	3	0	0	16	3
FW	(England) Syd Peppitt	9	2	0	0	9	2
FW	(England) Reginald Pickup	1	0	0	0	1	0
