= Norman Male =

English footballer

Personal information
- Full name: Norman Alfred Male
- Date of birth: 22 May 1917
- Place of birth: West Bromwich, England
- Date of death: 1992 (aged 75)
- Height: 5 ft 9 1/2 in (1.77 m)
- Position: Defender

Senior career*
Years	Team	Apps	(Gls)
1937–1938	West Bromwich Albion	3	(1)
1938–1949	Walsall	70	(2)
- * Club domestic league appearances and goals

Norman Alfred Male (22 May 1917 – 1992) was an English footballer who played in the Football League for West Bromwich Albion and Walsall.
