= Robert Dunkley (footballer) =

English footballer

Personal information
- Full name: Robert Dunkley
- Date of birth: 6 April 1922
- Place of birth: Stoke-on-Trent, England
- Date of death: 2002 (aged 79–80)
- Place of death: Stoke-on-Trent, England
- Position: Forward

Senior career*
Years	Team	Apps	(Gls)
1940–1941	Stoke City	0	(0)
1946–1947	Barrow	11	(0)
- * Club domestic league appearances and goals

Robert Dunkley (6 April 1922 – 2002) was an English footballer who played in the Football League for Barrow.

== Career ==
Dunkley was born in Stoke-on-Trent and joined Stoke City during World War II. He made three appearances for Stoke in 1940–41 scoring once against Notts County. He was called up for army service to fight in the war in 1942 and never played for the club again. After the end of the war he spent a season for Barrow playing 11 times.

== Career statistics ==
Club	Season	League		FA Cup		Total	
Club	Season	Apps	Goals	Apps	Goals	Apps	Goals
Barrow	1946–47	11	0	0	0	11	0
Career Total		11	0	0	0	11	0
