= George Stevens (English footballer) =

English footballer

Personal information
- Full name: George Leopold Stevens
- Date of birth: 18 March 1910
- Place of birth: Wallasey, England
- Date of death: 1987 (aged 76–77)
- Height: 5 ft 8 1/2 in (1.74 m)
- Position: Centre forward

Senior career*
Years	Team	Apps	(Gls)
- Wallasey Trams
1930–1931	New Brighton	54	(33)
1932	Everton	2	(0)
1933–1935	Southend United	72	(45)
1936–1937	Stockport County	28	(9)
1938–1939	Crewe Alexandra	25	(23)
Total		181	(110)
- * Club domestic league appearances and goals

George Leopold Stevens (18 March 1910 – 1987) was a footballer who played in the Football League for Crewe Alexandra, Everton, Stockport County, Southend United and guested for Stoke City during World War II. He was born in Wallasey, England.
