= George Mountford (footballer, born 1921) =

English footballer

Personal information
- Full name: George Fredrick Mountford
- Date of birth: 30 March 1921
- Place of birth: Kidderminster, England
- Date of death: 14 June 1973 (aged 52)
- Place of death: Kidderminster, England
- Position: Winger

Senior career*
Years	Team	Apps	(Gls)
1937–1942	Kidderminster Harriers		
1946–1950	Stoke City	123	(25)
1950–1951	Independiente Santa Fe	17	(9)
1951–1953	Stoke City	25	(0)
1953–1954	Queens Park Rangers	35	(2)
1953–1957	Hereford United		
1957	Kidderminster Harriers		
1958	Lockheed Leamington		
Total		200	(36)
- * Club domestic league appearances and goals

George Fredrick Mountford (30 March 1921 – 14 June 1973) was an English footballer who played in the Football League for Queens Park Rangers and Stoke City.

== Career ==
Mountford was born in Kidderminster and began his career playing for local side Kidderminster Harriers before joining Stoke City in December 1942 for a fee of £40. During the War League Mountford established himself in Bob McGrory's side as a right winger providing crosses for Tommy Sale and namesake Frank Mountford. With Stanley Matthews on wartime duty with Blackpool Mountford took his number 7 shirt and Matthews struggled to win it back. Whilst he was not as talented as Matthews, Mountford made up for it with his hard work and possessed a good turn of speed which often took him into goalscoring opportunities.

Throughout the 1946–47 season Matthews and Mountford both vied for the right wing position and when Matthews suffered an injury early in the campaign Mountford took his place. Even when Matthews had recovered McGrory stuck with Mountford as Stoke pushed for the First Division title. The Unhappy Matthews left for Blackpool in May 1947 and Mountford scored a vital goal against Aston Villa to take the title race in to the final day of the season. Stoke needed to beat Sheffield United to claim the title but they lost 2–1 and the chance had gone.

The side struggled with injuries in 1947–48 and Mountford made 29 appearances scoring five goals. He scored a career best of 11 in 1948–49 as Stoke finished in 11th position. In 1949–50 he played 32 times scoring six goals as the Potters narrowly avoided relegation. At the end of the 1949–50 season Mountford was convinced to join Colombian side Independiente Santa Fe along with Stoke teammate Neil Franklin, the move caused outrage with the FA as Colombia at the time was not a FIFA member. Mountford spent the who season in Colombia where he became a favourite with the Independiente support who dubbed him the "Bald Arrow".

He returned to Stoke in the summer of 1951 and he found himself both suspended by Stoke and the Football League. His suspension was lifted in September 1951 and he resumed playing in the Stoke team. In October 1953 Mountford was sold to Queens Park Rangers in exchange for Des Farrow. In September 1953 Mountford returned to his roots playing for Hereford United, Kidderminster Harriers and Lockheed Leamington.

== Career statistics ==
Club	Season	League			FA Cup		Total	
Club	Season	Division	Apps	Goals	Apps	Goals	Apps	Goals
Stoke City	1945–46	War League	–		6	1	6	1
Stoke City	1946–47	First Division	23	6	0	0	23	6
Stoke City	1947–48	First Division	29	5	0	0	29	5
Stoke City	1948–49	First Division	39	8	4	3	43	11
Stoke City	1949–50	First Division	32	6	0	0	32	6
Stoke City	1951–52	First Division	21	0	0	0	21	0
Stoke City	1952–53	First Division	4	0	0	0	4	0
Stoke City	Total		148	25	10	4	158	29
Queens Park Rangers	1952–53	Third Division South	25	2	3	0	28	2
Queens Park Rangers	1953–54	Third Division South	10	0	0	0	10	0
Queens Park Rangers	Total		35	2	3	0	38	2
Career Total			183	27	13	4	196	31
