= Cyril Watkin =

English footballer

Personal information
- Full name: Cyril Watkin
- Date of birth: 21 July 1926
- Place of birth: Stoke-on-Trent, England
- Date of death: 3 July 2007 (aged 80)
- Place of death: Stoke-on-Trent, England
- Position: Full back

Youth career
- Park Road School
- Packmoor
- Sneyd Colliery
- 1940–1948: Stoke City

Senior career*
Years	Team	Apps	(Gls)
1948–1952	Stoke City	86	(0)
1952–1953	Bristol City	3	(0)
Total		89	(0)
- * Club domestic league appearances and goals

Cyril Watkin (21 July 1926 – 3 July 2007) was an English footballer who played in the Football League for Bristol City and Stoke City.

== Career ==
Watkin was born in Stoke-on-Trent and joined local side Stoke City in 1940 after previously working for Sneyd Colliery. During World War II he briefly guested for Port Vale. He broke into the Stoke first-team during the 1948–49 season and missed only five matches in 1949–50. However, Watkin was unable to maintain his place in the side at the Victoria Ground and once manager Bob McGrory had left and Frank Taylor had been appointed, Watkin was deemed surplus to requirements. He was sold to Third Division South side Bristol City. Despite having been a First Division regular only a few years previously, he only managed three appearances for Pat Beasley's "Robins" before he decided to retire.

== Career statistics ==
Appearances and goals by club, season and competition
Club	Season	League			FA Cup		Total	
Club	Season	Division	Apps	Goals	Apps	Goals	Apps	Goals
Stoke City	1948–49	First Division	16	0	3	0	19	0
Stoke City	1949–50	First Division	37	0	1	0	38	0
Stoke City	1950–51	First Division	22	0	0	0	22	0
Stoke City	1951–52	First Division	11	0	0	0	11	0
Bristol City	1952–53	Third Division South	3	0	0	0	3	0
Career total			89	0	4	0	93	0
