= Edward Wordley =

English footballer

Personal information
- Full name: Edward Henry Wordley
- Date of birth: 17 October 1923
- Place of birth: Stoke-on-Trent, England
- Date of death: 1989 (aged 66)
- Place of death: Stoke-on-Trent, England
- Position: Midfielder

Senior career*
Years	Team	Apps	(Gls)
- Summerbank
1946–1950	Stoke City	10	(0)
1950–1951	Bury	0	(0)
1951–1952	Macclesfield Town	16	(1)
Total		26	(1)
- * Club domestic league appearances and goals

Edward Henry Wordley (17 October 1923 – 1989) was an English footballer who played in the Football League for Stoke City.

== Career ==
Wordley Joined Stoke from local side Summerbank in time for the first season after World War II. He made his debut in a 5–0 win against Preston North End in February 1947 and went on to play four more times during the 1946–47 season as Stoke narrowly missed out on the First Division title. However Wordley failed to make an impression on manager Bob McGrory and made just five more league appearances in the next three seasons. Following his release in 1950 he joined Bury but failed to break in to the side and decided to pursue a different career.

== Career statistics ==
Club	Season	League			FA Cup		Total	
Club	Season	Division	Apps	Goals	Apps	Goals	Apps	Goals
Stoke City	1946–47	First Division	5	0	0	0	5	0
Stoke City	1947–48	First Division	3	0	0	0	3	0
Stoke City	1948–49	First Division	1	0	0	0	1	0
Stoke City	1949–50	First Division	1	0	0	0	1	0
Stoke City	Total		10	0	0	0	10	0
Bury	1950–51	Second Division	0	0	0	0	0	0
Macclesfield Town	1951–52	Cheshire League	16	1	1	0	17	1
Career Total			26	1	1	0	27	1
