= Bill Caton =

English footballer (1924–2011)

Personal information
- Full name: William Clifford Caton
- Date of birth: 11 September 1924
- Place of birth: Kidsgrove, Stoke-on-Trent, England
- Date of death: 16 August 2011 (aged 86)
- Place of death: Cross Heath, Newcastle-under-Lyme, England
- Position: Inside forward

Senior career*
Years	Team	Apps	(Gls)
1947–1949	Stoke City	22	(2)
1949–1952	Carlisle United	61	(15)
1952–1953	Chesterfield	7	(0)
1953–1954	Worcester City		
1954–1955	Crewe Alexandra	39	(9)
1955–1957	Gresley Rovers	56	(24)
1957–1958	Mossley	4	(0)
Total		189	(50)
- * Club domestic league appearances and goals

William Clifford Caton (11 September 1924 – 16 August 2011) was an English footballer who played in the Football League for Carlisle United, Chesterfield, Crewe Alexandra and Stoke City.

== Army career ==
Caton joined the Second Field Regiment Royal Artillery during World War II and was captured and incarcerated by the Nazis in Italy. He managed to escape the prison camp by hiding in a vehicle and jumping out of it once it had left the camp.

== Football career ==
After leaving the Army in 1947 Caton started playing football for his local side Stoke City however he was never a favourite with manager Bob McGrory being used mostly as a reserve team player and left for Bill Shankly's Carlisle United in 1949. He later went on to play for Chesterfield, Worcester City, Crewe Alexandra, Gresley Rovers and Mossley. Caton was able to throw the ball a long way similar to that of Rory Delap. He died on 16 August 2011 at the age of 86.

== Career statistics ==
Appearances and goals by club, season and competition
Club	Season	League			FA Cup		Total	
Club	Season	Division	Apps	Goals	Apps	Goals	Apps	Goals
Stoke City	1947–48	First Division	3	1	0	0	3	1
Stoke City	1948–49	First Division	10	1	0	0	10	1
Stoke City	1949–50	First Division	9	0	0	0	9	0
Stoke City	Total		22	2	0	0	22	2
Carlisle United	1949–50	Third Division North	3	1	0	0	3	1
Carlisle United	1950–51	Third Division North	31	7	2	0	33	7
Carlisle United	1951–52	Third Division North	27	7	1	0	28	7
Carlisle United	Total		61	15	3	0	64	15
Chesterfield	1952–53	Third Division North	7	0	3	0	10	0
Crewe Alexandra	1954–55	Third Division North	39	9	1	0	39	9
Career total			129	26	7	0	136	26
