= John Sellars (footballer) =

English footballer

Personal information
- Full name: John Sellars
- Date of birth: 28 April 1924
- Place of birth: Stoke-on-Trent, England
- Date of death: 24 June 1985 (aged 61)
- Position: Left half

Senior career*
Years	Team	Apps	(Gls)
1944–1958	Stoke City	384	(14)
- * Club domestic league appearances and goals

John Sellars (28 April 1924 – 24 June 1985) was a footballer who played in the Football League for Stoke City. He made 384 appearances for Stoke. His father Harry was also a footballer who played for Stoke.

== Career ==
Sellars was born in Stoke-on-Trent, joining his local club Stoke City where his father Harry had played 395 matches for. He and a number of younger players played for Stoke during the War and was a regular in the side until the Football League resumed in 1946–47 where his place was taken by George Antonio. Frank Mountford's injury in January opened the door for the 22-year-old Sellars to take his chance and he filled in a right half easily, playing a vital role as Stoke fell short of winning their first ever League title. In 1947–48 Sellars had to fill in around Stoke's injury ravaged team, playing at full-back, right-wing and even centre-forward before finding his place at left-half replacing Jock Kirton despite being right footed. Manager Bob McGrory described Sellars as 'a managers dream' for his willingness to play in any position. Known also for his consistency, Sellars was ever present in 1948–49 and missed only three games over the next two seasons.

That run was ended in 1951–52 after he suffered from a slipped disc. Sellars recovered and was a regular under new manager Frank Taylor as Stoke were relegated in 1952–53 and were then left frustrated in the attempts to regain their First Division spot. His career was ended in a FA Cup match against Bolton Wanderers in January 1958 after he suffered a bad injury to his eye which left him with recurring double vision for the rest of his life. He retired in May 1959 and went on to run his own business in Bristol and was in the process to selling up and moving to Spain when he died in June 1985.

== Career statistics ==
Appearances and goals by club, season and competition
Club	Season	League			FA Cup		Total	
Club	Season	Division	Apps	Goals	Apps	Goals	Apps	Goals
Stoke City	1946–47	First Division	17	2	1	0	18	2
Stoke City	1947–48	First Division	31	2	2	1	33	3
Stoke City	1948–49	First Division	42	1	4	0	46	1
Stoke City	1949–50	First Division	40	3	1	0	41	3
Stoke City	1950–51	First Division	41	0	4	0	45	0
Stoke City	1951–52	First Division	23	4	4	0	27	4
Stoke City	1952–53	First Division	37	1	2	0	39	1
Stoke City	1953–54	Second Division	15	1	0	0	15	1
Stoke City	1954–55	Second Division	38	0	0	0	38	0
Stoke City	1955–56	Second Division	33	0	5	0	38	0
Stoke City	1956–57	Second Division	40	0	1	0	41	0
Stoke City	1957–58	Second Division	27	0	5	0	32	0
Career total			384	14	29	1	413	15
