= Jock Kirton =

Scottish footballer

Personal information
- Full name: John Kirton
- Date of birth: 4 March 1916
- Place of birth: Aberdeen, Scotland
- Date of death: 12 March 1996 (aged 80)
- Place of death: Stoke-on-Trent, England
- Height: 5 ft 10 in (1.78 m)
- Position: Left half

Senior career*
Years	Team	Apps	(Gls)
- St Marchers
–	Banks O' Dee		
1936–1952	Stoke City	219	(2)
1953–1954	Bradford City	8	(0)
–	Hinckley Athletic		
Total		227	(2)

International career
1944	Scotland (wartime)	1	(0)
- * Club domestic league appearances and goals

John Kirton (4 March 1916 – 12 March 1996) was a Scottish footballer who played in the English Football League for Bradford City and Stoke City. He made 249 appearances for Stoke.

== Career ==
Kirton was born in Aberdeen and played for St Marchers and Banks O' Dee, winning several Scottish schoolboy cap. Stoke City's Scottish based scouts recommend him to manager Bob McGrory who signed him in the summer of 1935 and he made a number of appearances as cover for Frank Soo over the following two seasons. Kirton's chance to claim his own place arrived when Soo moved to right half to fill in Arthur Turner's retirement in September 1938, playing in 38 matches in 1938–39. His career was interrupted by World War II and he continued to play for the club during the hostilities. He also guested for Leeds United, Nottingham Forest and Notts County. By chance he was in the same battalion as a number of his Stoke team-mates and the unit's team prospered well in the Army football cup.

Once the English Football League had been resumed Kirton lead Stoke to their first title challenge in 1946–47, described as the 'heartbeat of the side' Kirton's Stoke lost their must win match against Sheffield United and missed out on the grand prize. Stoke recorded record profits that season but little of it filtered down to the players and discontent set in. Kirton suffering from a broken ankle that restricted him to just one appearance in eighteen months handed in a transfer request in the summer of 1948, along with five other players. Kirton settled his differences with the club and following Neil Franklin's departure to Colombia he made team captain in August 1950 and missed just six matches in 1950–51 at just one, at the age of 36 in 1951–52. With Stoke heading for relegation in 1952–53 he lost his place to John Sellars and he moved to Bradford City on a free transfer. He was made player-coach and made eight appearances under manager Ivor Powell before deciding to retire. Kirton continued to play football for Hinckley Athletic and worked at Downings Tileries and returned to Stoke-on-Trent to earn a living in the building trade. He died in March 1996 at the age of 80.

== Career statistics ==
Appearances and goals by club, season and competition
Club	Season	League			FA Cup		Total	
Club	Season	Division	Apps	Goals	Apps	Goals	Apps	Goals
Stoke City	1936–37	First Division	12	0	2	0	14	0
Stoke City	1937–38	First Division	9	0	3	0	12	0
Stoke City	1938–39	First Division	36	0	2	0	38	0
Stoke City	1945–46	War League	—		7	0	7	0
Stoke City	1946–47	First Division	37	1	5	0	42	1
Stoke City	1947–48	First Division	26	0	2	0	28	0
Stoke City	1948–49	First Division	1	0	1	0	2	0
Stoke City	1949–50	First Division	15	1	0	0	15	1
Stoke City	1950–51	First Division	39	0	4	0	43	0
Stoke City	1951–52	First Division	41	0	4	0	45	0
Stoke City	1952–53	First Division	3	0	0	0	3	0
Stoke City	Total		219	2	30	0	249	2
Bradford City	1953–54	Second Division	8	0	0	0	8	0
Career total			227	2	30	0	257	2
