= Frank Mountford =

English footballer

Personal information
- Full name: Frank Mountford
- Date of birth: 30 March 1923
- Place of birth: Askern, Doncaster, England
- Date of death: 27 June 2006 (aged 83)
- Place of death: Stoke-on-Trent, England
- Position: Utility player

Senior career*
Years	Team	Apps	(Gls)
1946–1958	Stoke City	391	(21)
- * Club domestic league appearances and goals

Frank Mountford (30 March 1923 – 27 June 2006) was an English footballer who played in the Football League for Stoke City.

== Career ==
Mountford was thought to be one of many local start players to emerge from the youth ranks at the Victoria Ground during the 1940s but Mountford was born in Askern near Doncaster and moved to Stoke-on-Trent as a young boy. He broke into the first team during World War II and became one of the finest servants the club have had. During the War league seasons Mountford played as a centre forward and scored 23 goals during the 1940–41 season and 20 in 1942–43.

He gradually began to move out to defence and by the time Football League had resumed he was able to play in a number of positions and his best season in a Stoke shirt came in 1950–51 season where he played in every match at centre back in place of Neil Franklin who had caused controversy by moving to Colombia. He was a committed player who was always involved in the thick of the action and often required the attention of the club doctor. He retired in 1958 after making 425 appearances (600 including war league) scoring 24 goals. After hanging up his boots he moved to the back room staff and served as the club trainer and then coach until 1978.

== Career statistics ==
Appearances and goals by club, season and competition
Club	Season	League			FA Cup		Total	
Club	Season	Division	Apps	Goals	Apps	Goals	Apps	Goals
Stoke City	1945–46	War League	—		8	0	8	0
Stoke City	1946–47	First Division	26	0	4	1	30	1
Stoke City	1947–48	First Division	35	2	2	0	37	2
Stoke City	1948–49	First Division	40	5	4	1	44	6
Stoke City	1949–50	First Division	37	5	0	0	37	5
Stoke City	1950–51	First Division	42	2	3	1	45	3
Stoke City	1951–52	First Division	28	1	3	0	31	1
Stoke City	1952–53	First Division	37	5	2	0	39	5
Stoke City	1953–54	Second Division	41	1	3	0	44	1
Stoke City	1954–55	Second Division	40	0	3	0	43	0
Stoke City	1955–56	Second Division	15	0	1	0	16	0
Stoke City	1956–57	Second Division	39	0	1	0	40	0
Stoke City	1957–58	Second Division	11	0	0	0	11	0
Career total			391	21	34	3	425	24
