= Eric Hampson =

English footballer (born 1921)

Personal information
- Full name: Eric Hampson
- Date of birth: 11 November 1921
- Place of birth: Stoke-on-Trent, England
- Position: Defender

Senior career*
Years	Team	Apps	(Gls)
1938–1939	Summerbank		
1940–1952	Stoke City	8	(0)
1953	Stafford Rangers		
- * Club domestic league appearances and goals

Eric Hampson (born 11 November 1921) is an English former footballer who played in the Football League for Stoke City.

== Playing career ==
Hampson was born in Stoke-on-Trent on 11 November 1921. He joined Stoke City from local feeder club Summerbank during World War II. He joined the British Army during World War II, rising to the rank of Corporal, but continued playing, making an appearance for Dundee United in May 1942. He returned to Stoke in 1948, where he made just eight appearances in four seasons before leaving for non-league Stafford Rangers.

== Post-playing career ==
Hampson married Ethel Morris (1922–1973) at Smallthorne Parish Church in Stoke, in March 1942. He retired from professional football in 1954. In 1959, it was reported that Hampson subsequently became a confectioner and tobacconist, and had moved to Bognor with his wife. He served as Chairman of Bognor Regis Town F.C. from 1964 to 1968. In June 1972, Hampson and his wife moved to Wroxton, near Banbury in Oxfordshire, where they took over ownership and management of the local Wroxton Hotel. Ethel Hampson died after a long illness at her home in Peacehaven, East Sussex, on 3 December 1973, aged 51. The couple had three children, Christine, Linda and Vivian.

Hampson's subsequent whereabouts remain unknown. In April 2019, the editor of the Stafford Rangers matchday programme published an article in The Argus newspaper, entitled "Where is Eric?", appealing for information about his fate.

== Career statistics ==
Club	Season	League			FA Cup		Total	
Club	Season	Division	Apps	Goals	Apps	Goals	Apps	Goals
Stoke City	1948–49	First Division	1	0	0	0	1	0
Stoke City	1949–50	First Division	1	0	0	0	1	0
Stoke City	1950–51	First Division	1	0	0	0	1	0
Stoke City	1951–52	First Division	5	0	0	0	5	0
Career Total			8	0	0	0	8	0
