= Dennis Herod =

English footballer (1923–2009)

Personal information
- Full name: Dennis John Herod
- Date of birth: 27 October 1923
- Place of birth: Basford, England
- Date of death: 16 December 2009 (aged 86)
- Place of death: Wrinehill, England
- Position: Goalkeeper

Youth career
- Trent Vale United

Senior career*
Years	Team	Apps	(Gls)
1940–1953	Stoke City	191	(1)
1953–1954	Stockport County	33	(0)
Total		224	(1)
- * Club domestic league appearances and goals

Dennis John Herod (27 October 1923 – 16 December 2009) was an English footballer. He played as a goalkeeper for Stockport County and Stoke City, both members of the Football League.

== Playing career ==
Herod was born in Basford and joined Stoke City in 1940 from local non-league side Trent Vale United after impressing the watching Bob McGrory in the final of the Sentinel Shield. He made his debut during the 1940–41 with his first three matches ending in 5–1, 6–2 and 5–3 defeats, but despite this inauspicious start Herod was offered a professional contract. His war league appearances were restricted once he was called up to the 44th Royal Tank Regiment. Whilst training in Hampshire he guested for Aldershot along with Tommy Lawton, Joe Mercer and Stan Cullis. From 1943 Herod saw action in North Africa and Italy and narrowly escaped with his life when his tank received a direct hit in Normandy in August 1944, receiving only a fractured jaw.

He returned to Stoke in 1945 and was an ever-present in the final war league season of 1945–46 and played in Burnden Park disaster. Stoke supporters enjoying the clubs title challenge in 1946–47 soon dubbed their 'keeper as Dennis 'Herod the king' although Herod was more circumspect about his value in the side. " I was probably the weakest link in the team. I had not the physique to be a really top class goalkeeper like Frank Swift or Ted Ditchburn. I did however have fast reflexes and I could move quicker than most". He played in the title decider against Sheffield United on the final day of the season, Stoke lost 2–1. Heord admits to smoking heavily and gambling, vices which led him to be good friends with Neil Franklin where he was a groomsman at his wedding and received an offer to accompany him to Colombia. Herod declined not wanting to move away from the Potteries where his wife ran a successful grocery business. In the summer of 1950 McGrory signed Don Clegg from Bury to replace Herod. Stoke lost their first two games of the 1950–51 season and Clegg was unceremoniously dropped. Herord saw off numerous more challengers, including Arthur Jepson, Emmanuel Foster and Frank Elliott in his 14 years at the Victoria Ground, although his shortcomings meant that McGrory was constantly seeking a replacement.

Herod made history on 16 February 1952, in an away match at Aston Villa. He broke his arm in a brave challenge and spent the rest of the match at right wing with Stoke defending a 2–1 lead. Not considered a threat by Villa's defence Herod was left unmarked and found himself one on one with 'keeper Con Martin and calmly slotted the ball past him. However the following season new manager Frank Taylor signalled his arrival with the signing of Birmingham City's Bill Robertson. In December Robertson broke his leg and Herod was recalled although he himself broke his leg against West Bromwich Albion a month later. After Stoke were relegated he joined Stockport County for £750 in July 1953, playing 37 times for the Edgeley Park side before retiring aged 32.

== Post-retirement ==
He later became a popular greengrocer with his wife on the markets around Manchester and Stoke-on-Trent and stood as a local councillor for the Conservative Party and assisted Newcastle Town for a short period. he lived in Wrinehill, near Betley. Herod died on 16 December 2009 aged 86. He was the last member of the Stoke City squad which came close to winning the First Division title in 1947.

== Career statistics ==
Appearances and goals by club, season and competition
Club	Season	League			FA Cup		Total	
Club	Season	Division	Apps	Goals	Apps	Goals	Apps	Goals
Stoke City	1945–46	–	–		8	0	8	0
Stoke City	1946–47	First Division	14	0	1	0	15	0
Stoke City	1947–48	First Division	41	0	2	0	43	0
Stoke City	1948–49	First Division	41	0	4	0	45	0
Stoke City	1949–50	First Division	20	0	1	0	21	0
Stoke City	1950–51	First Division	35	0	3	0	38	0
Stoke City	1951–52	First Division	29	1	4	0	33	1
Stoke City	1952–53	First Division	11	0	1	0	12	0
Stoke City	Total		191	1	24	0	215	1
Stockport County	1953–54	Third Division North	33	0	4	0	37	0
Career Total			224	1	28	0	252	1
