= John Jackson (footballer, born 1923) =

English footballer

Personal information
- Full name: John Jackson
- Date of birth: 7 January 1923
- Place of birth: Newcastle-under-Lyme, England
- Date of death: June 1992 (aged 68)
- Place of death: Leek, Staffordshire, England
- Position: Centre forward

Senior career*
Years	Team	Apps	(Gls)
1944	Alsager Town		
1946–1947	Stoke City	4	(3)
1947–1948	Congleton Town		
- * Club domestic league appearances and goals

John Jackson (7 January 1923 – June 1992) was an English footballer who played in the Football League for Stoke City.

== Career ==
Jackson was born in Newcastle-under-Lyme and played amateur football with Alsager Town before joining Stoke City in 1946. He scored three goals in three matches in 1946–47 but failed to gain a regular place in Bob McGrory's starting eleven and after one more appearance in the next campaign he returned to amateur football with Congleton Town.

== Career statistics ==
Appearances and goals by club, season and competition
Club	Season	League			FA Cup		Total	
Club	Season	Division	Apps	Goals	Apps	Goals	Apps	Goals
Stoke City	1946–47	First Division	3	3	0	0	3	3
Stoke City	1947–48	First Division	1	0	0	0	1	0
Career total			4	3	0	0	4	3
