= Billy Mould =

English footballer

Personal information
- Full name: William Mould
- Date of birth: 6 October 1919
- Place of birth: Great Chell, Stoke-on-Trent, England
- Date of death: 27 September 1999 (aged 79)
- Place of death: Stoke-on-Trent, England
- Position: Full-back

Senior career*
Years	Team	Apps	(Gls)
–	Summerbank		
1937–1951	Stoke City	177	(0)
1952–1954	Crewe Alexandra	66	(1)
Total		243	(1)
- * Club domestic league appearances and goals

William Mould (6 October 1919 – 27 September 1999) was an English footballer who played in the Football League for Stoke City.

== Career ==
Mould signed for Stoke City as a junior in 1936 from local feeder side Summerbank along with Alexander Ormston, but saw his development curtailed by the outbreak of the Second World War. He was seen as a long-term replacement for Arthur Turner and after World War II Mould did indeed displace Turner. During the War, Mould spent time serving with the Royal Artillery in Normandy and also in Belfast with a number of other Stoke teammates during which time they turned out for Linfield.

When the War came to an end, Mould found himself playing at right back due to the emergence of Neil Franklin and although he was reluctant to switch positions he played with great distinction and was handed the captaincy for the end of the 1940s. He played for Stoke until 1952 before joining Crewe Alexandra, after making almost 200 appearances for the "Potters". After two years at Crewe he retired to concentrate on his successful sports outfitters business until his death in 1999.

== Career statistics ==
Appearances and goals by club, season and competition
Club	Season	League			FA Cup		Total	
Club	Season	Division	Apps	Goals	Apps	Goals	Apps	Goals
Stoke City	1937–38	First Division	10	0	0	0	10	0
Stoke City	1938–39	First Division	22	0	2	0	24	0
Stoke City	1946–47	First Division	30	0	5	0	35	0
Stoke City	1947–48	First Division	40	0	2	0	42	0
Stoke City	1948–49	First Division	25	0	0	0	25	0
Stoke City	1949–50	First Division	7	0	0	0	7	0
Stoke City	1950–51	First Division	20	0	4	0	24	0
Stoke City	1951–52	First Division	23	0	4	0	27	0
Stoke City	Total		177	0	17	0	194	0
Crewe Alexandra	1952–53	Third Division North	40	1	0	0	40	1
Crewe Alexandra	1953–54	Third Division North	26	0	3	0	29	0
Crewe Alexandra	Total		66	1	3	0	69	1
Career Total			243	1	23	0	265	1
