= Roy Brown (footballer, born 1923) =

English footballer

Personal information
- Full name: Roy Henry Brown
- Date of birth: 20 December 1923
- Place of birth: Stoke-on-Trent, England
- Date of death: November 1989 (aged 65)
- Place of death: Bushey, England
- Positions: Centre half; forward

Youth career
- 1939–1946: Stoke City

Senior career*
Years	Team	Apps	(Gls)
1946–1953	Stoke City	70	(14)
1953–1958	Watford	142	(40)
1958–19xx	Chelmsford City		
Total		212	(54)
- * Club domestic league appearances and goals

Roy Henry Brown (20 December 1923 – November 1989) was an English professional footballer who played as both a centre half and a striker. Brown was the first black player in the history of his first team, Stoke City. Brown also played for Watford, making a total of 212 appearances in the Football League for both clubs.

== Career ==
Brown was born in Stoke-on-Trent and was the son of a Nigerian father, and English mother. He joined Stoke City in 1939 and played for the club during World War II whilst also serving with the army. The Football League resumed in 1946–47 with Brown making history on 28 September 1946 playing in Stoke's 3–1 win over Preston North End he became the club's first black player and he ended the season with four appearances. He was used a back-up utility player by manager Bob McGrory eventually playing regularly in 1950–51 where he played in 29 matches. He scored eight goals in 16 matches during the 1952–53 campaign, the second highest as Stoke suffered relegation from the First Division.

Brown now seeking regular first team football, left the Victoria Ground in the summer of 1953 for Third Division South side Watford. He spent the first season with the "Hornets" as a centre forward and he scored 21 goals as Watford finished in 4th position. He remained at Vicarage Road for four more seasons before ending his career with non-league Chelmsford City.

== Career statistics ==
Club	Season	Division	League		FA Cup		Total	
Club	Season	Division	Apps	Goals	Apps	Goals	Apps	Goals
Stoke City	1946–47	First Division	4	0	0	0	4	0
Stoke City	1947–48	First Division	7	0	0	0	7	0
Stoke City	1948–49	First Division	2	0	0	0	2	0
Stoke City	1949–50	First Division	0	0	1	0	1	0
Stoke City	1950–51	First Division	26	4	3	0	29	4
Stoke City	1951–52	First Division	15	2	0	0	15	2
Stoke City	1952–53	First Division	16	8	0	0	16	8
Stoke City	Total		70	14	4	0	74	14
Watford	1953–54	Third Division South	36	21	1	0	37	21
Watford	1954–55	Third Division South	31	13	1	0	32	13
Watford	1955–56	Third Division South	29	2	2	1	31	2
Watford	1956–57	Third Division South	37	4	1	0	38	4
Watford	1957–58	Third Division South	9	0	0	0	9	0
Watford	Total		142	40	5	1	147	41
Career Total			212	54	9	1	221	55
