= Syd Peppitt =

English footballer

Personal information
- Full name: Sydney Peppitt
- Date of birth: 8 September 1919
- Place of birth: Hanley, England
- Date of death: 25 December 1992 (aged 73)
- Place of death: Stoke-on-Trent, England
- Position: Right winger

Senior career*
Years	Team	Apps	(Gls)
1936–1950	Stoke City	94	(29)
1945–1946	→ Queens Park Rangers (guest)	1	(0)
1950–1951	Port Vale	11	(3)
- Worcester City
Total		105	(32)
- * Club domestic league appearances and goals

Sydney Peppitt (8 September 1919 – 25 December 1992) was an English footballer who played in the English Football League for Port Vale and Stoke City.

== Career ==
=== Stoke City ===
Peppitt began his career with his local club, Stoke City and made his debut during the 1936–37 season. He impressed in a few appearances in 1937–38 and 1938–39 but found it difficult to break into the first-team with Stanley Matthews occupying his position. His career was interrupted by World War II, during which time he played for Stoke and was also called up to the territorial army in Belfast and guested for Linfield. When League football resumed in 1946–47 he played in 29 matches scoring 12 goals as Stoke nearly won the First Division title, losing their must win match against Sheffield United 2–1. Peppitt remained in the side for the next two seasons before falling out of favour with manager Bob McGrory in 1949–50, making just nine appearances.

=== Port Vale ===
He was sold to local rivals Port Vale in May 1950 for a £4,000 fee. He started the 1950–51 season with the #8 jersey, but Walter Aveyard showed his quality to quickly win it back and deny Peppitt a place in the first XI. After picking up an injury in November 1950, he only played one more game before being released at the season's end. He moved on to Worcester City of the Southern League.

== Career statistics ==
Appearances and goals by club, season and competition
Club	Season	League			FA Cup		Total	
Club	Season	Division	Apps	Goals	Apps	Goals	Apps	Goals
Stoke City	First Division	1936–37	3	0	0	0	3	0
Stoke City	First Division	1937–38	4	3	1	0	5	3
Stoke City	First Division	1938–39	6	2	0	0	6	2
Stoke City	First Division	1945–46	0	0	2	0	2	0
Queens Park Rangers (guest)	First Division	1945–46	1	0	0	0	1	0
Stoke City	First Division	1946–47	24	12	5	0	29	12
Stoke City	First Division	1947–48	28	5	0	0	28	5
Stoke City	First Division	1948–49	20	5	4	0	24	5
Stoke City	First Division	1949–50	9	2	0	0	9	2
	Total		94	29	12	0	106	29
Port Vale	Third Division South	1950–51	11	3	0	0	11	3
Career total			105	32	12	0	117	32
