= Bert Mitchell =

English footballer (1922–1997)

Personal information
- Full name: Albert James Mitchell
- Date of birth: 22 January 1922
- Place of birth: Stoke-on-Trent, England
- Date of death: April 1997 (aged 75)
- Position: Winger

Senior career*
Years	Team	Apps	(Gls)
1938	Burslem Albion		
1941–1948	Stoke City	10	(2)
1948	Blackburn Rovers	3	(0)
1948–1949	Kettering Town		
1949–1951	Northampton Town	81	(21)
1951–1954	Luton Town	106	(41)
1954–1956	Middlesbrough	50	(6)
1956–1957	Southport	16	(3)
1957–1958	Wellington Town		
1958–1959	Kidderminster Harriers		
1959	Stafford Rangers		
Total		266	(73)
- * Club domestic league appearances and goals

Albert James Mitchell (born 22 January 1922 – April 1997) was an English footballer who played in the Football League for Blackburn Rovers, Luton Town, Middlesbrough, Northampton Town, Southport and Stoke City.

== Career ==
Mitchell began his career with local side Burslem Albion, before joining Stoke City where he played four times in 1946–47 scoring twice against Middlesbrough and then featured six times in 1947–48. After two years at the Victoria Ground Mitchell had a short spell with Blackburn Rovers before joining Kettering Town. Northampton Town was his next club, as he signed for them in 1949. After 81 league appearances, Mitchell signed for Luton Town, where he spent three seasons before transferring to Middlesbrough early on in the 1954–55 season. After two years at Ayresome Park, he moved on to Southport, Wellington Town, Kidderminster Harriers, and Stafford Rangers.

== Career statistics ==
Appearances and goals by club, season and competition
Club	Season	League			FA Cup		Total	
Club	Season	Division	Apps	Goals	Apps	Goals	Apps	Goals
Stoke City	1946–47	First Division	4	2	0	0	4	2
Stoke City	1947–48	First Division	6	0	0	0	6	0
Stoke City	Total		10	2	0	0	10	2
Blackburn Rovers	1947–48	First Division	3	0	0	0	3	0
Northampton Town	1949–50	Third Division South	37	14	7	6	44	20
Northampton Town	1950–51	Third Division South	44	7	2	2	46	9
Northampton Town	Total		81	21	9	8	90	29
Luton Town	1951–52	Second Division	41	16	6	1	47	17
Luton Town	1952–53	Second Division	33	12	3	1	36	13
Luton Town	1953–54	Second Division	30	12	4	0	34	12
Luton Town	1954–55	Second Division	2	1	0	0	2	1
Luton Town	Total		106	41	13	2	119	43
Middlesbrough	1954–55	Second Division	31	5	0	0	31	5
Middlesbrough	1955–56	Second Division	19	1	2	0	21	1
Middlesbrough	Total		50	6	2	0	52	6
Southport	1956–57	Third Division North	16	3	1	0	17	3
Career total			266	73	52	10	278	83
