= Harry Brigham =

English footballer

Personal information
- Full name: Harold Brigham
- Date of birth: 19 November 1914
- Place of birth: Selby, England
- Date of death: 1978
- Height: 5 ft 8 1/2 in (1.74 m)
- Position: Right back

Senior career*
Years	Team	Apps	(Gls)
	Bolton Wanderers	0	(0)
?–1936	Frickey Colliery	?	(?)
1936–1946	Stoke City	104	(0)
1946–1947	Nottingham Forest	35	(2)
1948–1950	York City	56	(5)
1950–?	Gainsborough Trinity	?	(?)
	Selby Town	?	(?)
Total		195	(7)
- * Club domestic league appearances and goals

Harold "Harry" Brigham (born 1914) was an English footballer who played in the Football League for Nottingham Forest, Stoke City and York City.

== Career ==
Born in Selby, West Riding of Yorkshire, Brigham started his career at Bolton Wanderers as an amateur before playing for Frickley Colliery. Following persistent overtures from Stoke City, he eventually joined Football League side in May 1936. He went on make 104 appearances in the Football League for Stoke as well as 216 in the wartime league. He also played for Chester and Wrexham as a wartime guest. He left in November 1946 just after the end of the war to join Nottingham Forest for a fee of £4,000, where he made 35 league appearances. He went on to sign for York City in July 1948. After making 60 appearances and scoring six goals in all competitions he signed for Gainsborough Trinity in June 1950, before finishing his career with hometown club Selby Town.

== Career statistics ==
Appearances and goals by club, season and competition
Club	Season	League			FA Cup		Total	
Club	Season	Division	Apps	Goals	Apps	Goals	Apps	Goals
Stoke City	1936–37	First Division	21	0	2	0	23	0
Stoke City	1937–38	First Division	32	0	3	0	35	0
Stoke City	1938–39	First Division	39	0	2	0	41	0
Stoke City	1945–46	War League	0	0	8	0	8	0
Stoke City	1946–47	First Division	12	0	0	0	12	0
Stoke City	Total		104	0	15	0	119	0
Nottingham Forest	1946–47	Second Division	28	2	4	0	32	2
Nottingham Forest	1947–48	Second Division	7	0	0	0	7	0
Nottingham Forest	Total		35	2	4	0	39	2
York City	1948–49	Third Division North	30	5	3	1	33	6
York City	1949–50	Third Division North	26	0	1	0	27	0
York City	Total		56	5	4	1	60	6
Career total			195	7	23	1	218	8
