= Emmanuel Foster =

English footballer

Personal information
- Full name: Emmanuel Foster
- Date of birth: 4 December 1921
- Place of birth: Stoke-on-Trent, England
- Date of death: 1965 (aged 43–44)
- Place of death: Stoke-on-Trent, England
- Position: Goalkeeper

Senior career*
| Years | Team | Apps | (Gls) |
| 1942–1946 | Mow Cop | | |
| 1946–1947 | Stoke City | 1 | (0) |
| 1948 | Stafford Rangers | | |
- * Club domestic league appearances and goals

Emmanuel Foster (4 December 1921 – December 1965) was an English footballer who played in the Football League for Stoke City.

== Career ==
Foster played for Mow Cop before joining Stoke during World War II. He made one appearance for Stoke in the Football League which came in a 3–2 defeat away at Bolton Wanderers in September 1946. Afterwards he left the club for non-league Stafford Rangers.

== Career statistics ==
| Club | Season | League | | | FA Cup | | Total | |
| Club | Season | Division | Apps | Goals | Apps | Goals | Apps | Goals |
|---|---|---|---|---|---|---|---|---|
| Stoke City | 1946–47 | First Division | 1 | 0 | 0 | 0 | 1 | 0 |
| Career Total | | | 1 | 0 | 0 | 0 | 1 | 0 |
