= Neil Franklin =

English footballer (1922–1996)

Personal information
- Full name: Cornelius Franklin
- Date of birth: 24 January 1922
- Place of birth: Shelton, Staffordshire, England
- Date of death: 9 February 1996 (aged 74)
- Place of death: Stoke-on-Trent, England
- Position: Defender

Senior career*
Years	Team	Apps	(Gls)
1939–1950	Stoke City	142	(0)
1950	Independiente Santa Fe	6	(1)
1951–1956	Hull City	95	(0)
1956–1957	Crewe Alexandra	66	(4)
1957–1958	Stockport County	20	(0)
1960–1961	Macclesfield Town	13	(1)
Total		342	(6)

International career
1946–1950	England	26	(0)

Managerial career
- 1963–1964: APOEL
- 1964–1968: Colchester United
- * Club domestic league appearances and goals

Cornelius "Neil" Franklin (24 January 1922 – 9 February 1996) was an English footballer who played for Crewe Alexandra, Hull City, Stockport County and Stoke City as well as the England national team.

== Playing career ==
=== Stoke City ===
Franklin was born in Shelton, Stoke-on-Trent and emerged from Stoke City's nursery club Stoke Old Boys. At 15 he won schoolboy international honours as a right half and signed professional forms with Stoke in January 1939. The outbreak of World War II soon gave opportunities to Stoke's apprentices and Franklin made his senior debut at the end of 1939–40, before volunteering with the Royal Air Force in February 1941. He converted to centre back due to the absence of Billy Mould and also took his place of captain. Franklin thrived in his new-found position and his positioning and tackling ability was described by the press as 'perfection'. Franklin helped remove the stereotype of centre backs as being just stoppers as he was very comfortable on the ball and earned his first England cap in February 1945. His goalkeeper Dennis Herod was often left frustrated by Franklin's genius. "He was a great player, but so unpredictable. If he was under pressure he would shout to me Dennis, come on and I would come out expecting him to give me the ball. Nine times out of ten he would do a u-turn and trot off up the field. It was like playing in a minefield. He didn't believe he could have a bad game and was the only one who didn't suffer with nerves."

Stoke narrowly missed out on their first league title in 1946–47 losing their must win match against Sheffield United 2–1. Stoke manager Bob McGrory was becoming frustrated with his side's best players, and after selling Stanley Matthews to Blackpool and his gripe soon turned to Franklin. McGrory wanted him to play the ball earlier rather than keep possession and be more physical in his defensive work which led him to handing the captaincy back to Mould. McGrory's campaign against him eventually led Franklin to announcing his intentions to leave Stoke in the summer of 1949. A world record bid of £30,000 from Hull City was mooted but the Stoke directors rejected Franklin's request and he re-signed four games into the 1949–50 season. However, he won a large bet of £250 which gave him the confidence to make an astonishing announcement to the football world. He declined a place in the England squad for the 1950 FIFA World Cup in Brazil, saying that his wife was due to give birth in the summer and he was to spend time playing in Colombia for Independiente Santa Fe.

=== Move to Colombia ===
Santa Fe's president, Luis Robledo, had studied at Cambridge and believed that high quality football could put an end to the country's civil war. Robledo also tempted Franklin's Stoke teammate George Mountford to join him in Bogotá. The pair were paid £60 per week plus a huge £2,000 signing-on fee, more than four times the maximum wage in England. England manager Walter Winterbottom tried to persuade him not to go but he ignored his request and left for Santa Fe on 8 May 1950. In Colombia they joined up with Manchester United's Charlie Mitten. Colombia had been expelled by FIFA for poaching players from around the world and the 'rebel' players were also banned by FIFA. On arriving in Colombia Franklin was full of bravado, saying that "We'll live finer than any footballers in the world." Despite a good start with Santa Fe, problems soon arose. A 6.30 pm curfew limited their ability to socialise, and his wife was struggling with the culture and unrest, so Franklin returned to England by August.

=== Return to England ===
On his return to England Franklin faced the wrath of the Football Association and Stoke who suspended him indefinitely and then sold him to Hull City in February 1951 for £22,500. Damaged knee ligaments restricted Franklin's movement and he failed to reach his former high standards. In February 1956 he joined Crewe Alexandra and then ended his career with Stockport County and finally non-league Macclesfield Town.

== Managerial career ==
In 1961 Franklin became player-manager at Wellington Town, Shropshire [renamed Telford United in 1969 after the new town Development], joining former England player, Johnny Hancocks. He returned to Europe in 1963 and managed APOEL in Cyprus where his time was cut short again due to civil war. He joined Colchester United in 1964 and got the club promoted in 1965–66, however relegation followed in 1967–68 and he was sacked.

== Legacy ==
In August 2019, the story of Neil Franklin's life and career was published in a book entitled England's Greatest Defender: The Untold Story of Neil Franklin by author Alfie Potts Harmer; the creator of the YouTube channel HITC Sevens and a fan of Hull City, one of Franklin's former clubs.

== Career statistics ==
=== Club ===
Appearances and goals by club, season and competition
Club	Season	League			FA Cup		Total	
Club	Season	Division	Apps	Goals	Apps	Goals	Apps	Goals
Stoke City	1945–46	–	–		8	0	8	0
Stoke City	1946–47	First Division	37	0	5	0	42	0
Stoke City	1947–48	First Division	35	0	2	0	37	0
Stoke City	1948–49	First Division	36	0	4	0	40	0
Stoke City	1949–50	First Division	34	0	1	0	35	0
Stoke City	Total		142	0	20	0	162	0
Independiente Santa Fe	1950–51	Categoría Primera A	6	1	0	0	6	1
Hull City	1950–51	Second Division	14	0	0	0	14	0
Hull City	1951–52	Second Division	13	0	0	0	13	0
Hull City	1952–53	Second Division	8	0	0	0	8	0
Hull City	1953–54	Second Division	15	0	1	0	16	0
Hull City	1954–55	Second Division	38	0	0	0	38	0
Hull City	1955–56	Second Division	7	0	0	0	7	0
Hull City	Total		95	0	1	0	96	0
Crewe Alexandra	1955–56	Third Division North	13	3	1	0	14	3
Crewe Alexandra	1956–57	Third Division North	41	1	2	0	43	1
Crewe Alexandra	1957–58	Third Division North	12	0	0	0	12	0
Crewe Alexandra	Total		66	4	2	0	68	4
Stockport County	1957–58	Third Division North	20	0	4	0	24	0
Macclesfield Town	1960–61	Cheshire League	13	1	0	0	13	1
Career Total			342	6	27	0	369	6

=== International ===
Appearances and goals by national team and year
National team	Year	Apps	Goals
England	1946	4	0
England	1947	8	0
England	1948	6	0
England	1949	7	0
England	1950	1	0
Total		26	0

=== Managerial statistics ===
Team	From	To	Record				
Team	From	To	P	W	D	L	Win %
Colchester United	2 December 1963	13 May 1968	234	72	62	100	30.8
