= Alexander Ormston =

English footballer (1919–1975)

Personal information
- Full name: Alexander Ormston
- Date of birth: 10 February 1919
- Place of birth: Stoke-on-Trent, England
- Date of death: 12 July 1975 (aged 56)
- Place of death: Stoke-on-Trent, England
- Position: Winger

Senior career*
Years	Team	Apps	(Gls)
1936	Summerbank		
1937–1951	Stoke City	172	(29)
1941	→ Linfield (loan)		
1952	Hereford United		
1953	Stafford Rangers		
1954	Runcorn		
- * Club domestic league appearances and goals

Alexander Ormston (10 February 1919 – 12 July 1975) was an English footballer who played in the Football League for Stoke City.

== Career ==
Ormston attended Wellington Road school where he was captain of the Hanley boys and Stoke-on-Trent schools football teams. After finishing school he started work at a local colliery whilst also playing football with Summerbank, a nursery club for local league side Stoke City. He signed professional forms with Stoke when he was 17 and made his debut the following year. He had a peculiar crouching style, huddled over the ball with his body arched forward at a seemingly impossible angle as he was a hunchback. However, despite this at 5 ft 6 he was a pacey winger whose major strength was his crossing and his ability to track back and help out the defence which was unheard of in the 1940s. During the war he joined the home guard where he was stationed in Belfast. Whilst in Northern Ireland he played with Linfield where he won a number of honours.

When the football League resumed he had a prolific 1946–47 season scoring 20 goals in 40 matches from left wing as Stoke came within one win of winning the First Division title. In the final match of the season Stoke knew that a win at Sheffield United would hand them their first league title, Ormston scored as Stoke lost 2–1. Ormston started to have more chest complaints in 1949 and he missed most of the season before returning for the 1950–51 season. However the team started to split up and with new players being brought in Ormston left at the age of 32 for Hereford United and later played for Stafford Rangers and Runcorn.

== After football ==
Ormston spent time recuperating at Loggerheads sanatorium in Shropshire before becoming landlord at the Fountain Head in Hanley and later worked in the offices of a colliery. He also worked part-time at Stoke City's promotions office.

== Career statistics ==
Appearances and goals by club, season and competition
Club	Season	League			FA Cup		Total	
Club	Season	Division	Apps	Goals	Apps	Goals	Apps	Goals
Stoke City	1937–38	First Division	6	0	0	0	6	0
Stoke City	1938–39	First Division	9	0	1	0	10	0
Stoke City	1945–46	War League	—		4	0	4	0
Stoke City	1946–47	First Division	40	20	5	1	45	21
Stoke City	1947–48	First Division	33	5	2	0	35	5
Stoke City	1948–49	First Division	42	2	4	0	46	2
Stoke City	1949–50	First Division	5	0	0	0	5	0
Stoke City	1950–51	First Division	35	2	4	0	39	2
Stoke City	1951–52	First Division	2	0	0	0	2	0
Career total			172	29	20	1	192	30
