= 1943–44 Stoke City F.C. season =

Stoke City
1943–44 season
- Chairman: Mr H. Booth
- Manager: Bob McGrory
- Stadium: Victoria Ground
- Football League North 1st Phase: 34th
- Football League North 2nd Phase: 13th
- Football League War Cup: First Round
- Top goalscorer: Tommy Sale (30)
- Highest home attendance: 20,000 vs Birmingham (29 January 1944)
- Lowest home attendance: 2,106 vs Wolverhampton Wanderers (29 April 1944)
Home colours

The 1943–44 season was Stoke City's ninth season in the non-competitive War League.

In 1939 World War II was declared and the Football League was cancelled. In its place were formed War Leagues and cups, based on geographical lines rather than based on previous league placement. However, none of these were considered to be competitive football, and thus their records are not recognised by the Football League and thus not included in official records.

== Season review ==
With the war now at its most demanding clubs had to rely on even more guest players and Stoke used the most players this season more than any other time during the war. With most senior players being called for military duty there was a largely youthful feel to Stoke squad for the 1943–44 season and it showed as they ended the first phase of the Football League North in an overall position of 34th (out of 50 teams) and in the second phase they finished in 13th. Freddie Steele hit an impressive 20 goals from just 9 matches including a double hat trick against Wolverhampton Wanderers.

== Results ==
Stoke's score comes first

=== Legend ===
Win	Draw	Loss

=== Football League North 1st Phase ===
Match	Date	Opponent	Venue	Result	Attendance	Scorers
1	23 August 1943	Aston Villa	H	0–2	6,000	
2	4 September 1943	Aston Villa	A	1–2	15,000	Sale
3	11 September 1943	Crewe Alexandra	A	1–2	4,905	F Mountford
4	18 September 1943	Crewe Alexandra	H	4–2	3,950	Sale, Bowyer (2), G Mountford
5	25 September 1943	Derby County	H	5–1	4,000	Leuty (o.g.), Peppitt (2), G Mountford, Franklin
6	2 October 1943	Derby County	A	2–2	8,000	Bowyer, Liddle
7	9 October 1943	Wolverhampton Wanderers	H	5–0	5,119	Bowyer, G Mountford (2), Basnett (2)
8	16 October 1943	Wolverhampton Wanderers	A	2–1	7,242	Basnett (2)
9	23 October 1943	Birmingham	H	1–1	5,000	G Mountford
10	30 October 1943	Birmingham	A	0–2	3,900	
11	6 November 1943	West Bromwich Albion	H	3–3	3,520	Sale (2), Liddle
12	13 November 1943	West Bromwich Albion	A	0–3	6,912	
13	20 November 1943	Wrexham	A	1–4	3,850	Sale
14	27 November 1943	Wrexham	H	7–3	3,000	Sale (2), Basnett (2), Steele (2), Liddle
15	4 December 1943	Crewe Alexandra	H	5–0	3,500	Sale (2), Peppitt (2), Basnett
16	11 December 1943	Crewe Alexandra	A	1–2	3,000	Franklin
17	18 December 1943	Walsall	A	2–4	1,147	Clewlow, Rist (o.g.)
18	28 December 1943	Walsall	H	0–1	6,022	

=== Football League North 2nd Phase ===
Match	Date	Opponent	Venue	Result	Attendance	Scorers
1	18 March 1944	Leicester City	H	2–5	3,279	F Mountford, Sellars
2	25 March 1944	Leicester City	A	2–2	7,000	Ormston, Bowyer
3	10 April 1944	Crewe Alexandra	A	6–1	4,350	Bowyer (2), Sale (2), F Mountford, Pointon
4	29 April 1944	Wolverhampton Wanderers	H	2–2	2,156	Sale, Jackson
5	6 May 1944	Wolverhampton Wanderers	A	1–2	1,997	Watkin

=== Football League War Cup ===
Round	Date	Opponent	Venue	Result	Attendance	Scorers
QR	30 December 1943	Wolverhampton Wanderers	A	1–1	19,951	Sale
QR	1 January 1944	Wolverhampton Wanderers	H	9–3	6,798	Steele (6), Sale (2), Liddle
QR	8 January 1944	Aston Villa	H	6–3	16,492	Steele (3), Peppitt (3)
QR	15 January 1944	Aston Villa	A	2–0	32,000	Kirton, Ormston
QR	22 January 1944	Birmingham	A	1–4	1,750	Basnett
QR	29 January 1944	Birmingham	H	4–1	20,000	Steele (3), Sale
QR	5 February 1944	Walsall	H	5–1	4,000	Sale (2), Ormston, Peppitt, Shelton (o.g.)
QR	12 February 1944	Walsall	A	2–0	1,986	Sale, F Mountford
QR	19 February 1944	West Bromwich Albion	A	8–2	5,000	Sale (3), Steele (4), Bowyer
QR	26 February 1944	West Bromwich Albion	H	5–4	8,000	Sale (2), Steele (2), G Mountford
R1 1st leg	4 March 1944	Aston Villa	H	4–5	11,508	Sale (2), Steele (2)
R1 2nd leg	11 March 1944	Aston Villa	A	0–3	22,000	

=== Midland Cup ===
Round	Date	Opponent	Venue	Result	Attendance	Scorers
R1 1st leg	1 April 1944	Derby County	A	3–1	9,000	Peppitt, Steele, Bowyer
R1 2nd leg	8 April 1944	Derby County	H	1–1	7,000	Basnett
R2 1st leg	15 April 1944	West Bromwich Albion	H	1–1	3,434	Sale
R2 2nd leg	22 April 1944	West Bromwich Albion	A	1–3	7,202	Southern (o.g.)

== Squad statistics ==
Pos.	Name	Matches	
Pos.	Name	Apps	Goals
GK	(England) Emmanuel Foster	17	0
GK	(England) Dennis Herod	1	0
GK	(England) Edgar Podmore	1	0
GK	(England) Norman Wilkinson	8	0
DF	(England) Harry Brigham	16	0
DF	(England) Sid Clewlow	2	1
DF	(England) Stuart Cowden	3	0
DF	(England) Doug Dunn	1	0
DF	(England) Neil Franklin	34	2
DF	(England) Jack Griffiths	4	0
DF	(England) Lol Hamlett	10	0
DF	(England) Eric Hayward	6	0
DF	(England) Bill Kinson	18	0
DF	(England) John McCue	34	0
DF	(England) John Sellars	3	1
DF	(England) Roy Shufflebottom	1	0
DF	(England) Cyril Watkin	1	1
MF	(England) Jack Edwards	3	0
MF	(England) Stanley Glover	1	0
MF	(Scotland) Jock Kirton	8	1
MF	(England) Bobby Liddle	25	4
MF	(England) George Mountford	19	6
MF	(England) Jim Simpson	2	0
MF	(England) Frank Soo	2	0
MF	(England) Bobby Windsor	2	0
MF	(England) Edward Wordley	1	0
MF	(England) Bert Wright	1	0
FW	(England) Fred Basnett	22	9
FW	(England) Edwin Blunt	1	0
FW	(England) Frank Bowyer	32	9
FW	(England) Bill Caton	2	0
FW	(England) Roy Crossley	3	0
FW	(England) Stanley Harrison	2	0
FW	(England) John Jackson	3	1
FW	(England) Stanley Matthews	3	0
FW	(England) Alfred Massey	2	0
FW	(England) Frank Mountford	29	4
FW	(England) Alexander Ormston	12	3
FW	(England) Syd Peppitt	11	9
FW	(England) Bill Pointon	2	1
FW	(England) Tommy Sale	39	30
FW	(England) Freddie Steele	9	20
FW	(England) Thomas Vallance	1	0
FW	(England) Ken West	1	0
