= 1939–40 Stoke City F.C. season =

Stoke City
1939–40 season
- Chairman: Mr H. Booth
- Manager: Bob McGrory
- Stadium: Victoria Ground
- War League West Regional Championship: 1st
- Football League War Cup: Third Round
- Top goalscorer: League: All: Tommy Sale (24)
- Highest home attendance: 16,268 vs Charlton Athletic (26 August 1939)
- Lowest home attendance: 714 vs Tranmere Rovers (6 January 1940)
Home colours

The 1939–40 season was Stoke City's fifth season in the non-competitive War League. It would have been their 26th season in the Football League First Division but after just three matches the League was cancelled due to World War II.

In 1939 World War II was declared and the Football League was cancelled. In its place were formed War Leagues and cups, based on geographical lines rather than based on previous league placement. However, none of these were considered to be competitive football, and thus their records are not recognised by the Football League and thus not included in official records.

== Season review ==
Stoke started the 1939–40 season with a match against Wolverhampton Wanderers in the Football League Jubilee Fund losing 4–2. The Stoke players wore squad numbers for the first time in this match. After just three First Division matches had been played the Football League was cancelled and although a regional war-league was set up attendances suffered alarmingly. Stoke had looked a useful side with a lot of young, talented players before the hostilities came along and ruined the careers of many and from October 1939 to May 1946 the club missed out on what could have been a successful seven-year period.

With the cancellation of the league action, the re-organised competitions started on 21 October 1939, with 82 of the 88 clubs participating. Stoke drew their first match 4–4 with Everton with Tommy Sale scoring a fine hat-trick. With players being called up for military duty and with travelling very difficult plus the fact that Stanley Matthews was in heavy demand for guest matches team selection was never easy for Bob McGrory. Stoke brought in their own guest players to the Victoria Ground and they proved to be very successful as Stoke won the 1939–40 Western League finishing two points ahead of Liverpool.

== Final league table ==
=== West Regional Championship ===
Pos	Team	Pld	W	D	L	GF	GA	GAv	Pts
1	Stoke City	22	13	5	4	57	41	1.390	31
2	Liverpool	22	12	5	5	66	40	1.650	29
3	Everton	22	12	4	6	64	33	1.939	28
4	Manchester United	22	14	0	8	74	41	1.805	28
5	Manchester City	22	12	4	6	73	41	1.780	28
6	Wrexham	22	10	5	7	45	50	0.900	25
7	New Brighton	22	10	3	9	55	52	1.058	23
8	Port Vale	22	10	2	10	52	56	0.929	22
9	Chester	22	7	5	10	40	51	0.784	19
10	Crewe Alexandra	22	6	1	15	44	79	0.557	13
11	Stockport County	22	4	3	15	45	79	0.570	11
12	Tranmere Rovers	22	2	3	17	41	93	0.441	7

=== First Division ===
- Note: The Football League was cancelled after three matches.

Pos	Team	Pld	W	D	L	GF	GA	GAv	Pts
1	Blackpool	3	3	0	0	5	2	2.500	6
2	Sheffield United	3	2	1	0	3	1	3.000	5
3	Arsenal	3	2	1	0	8	4	2.000	5
4	Liverpool	3	2	0	1	6	3	2.000	4
5	Everton	3	1	2	0	5	4	1.250	4
6	Bolton Wanderers	3	2	0	1	6	5	1.200	4
7	Derby County	3	2	0	1	3	3	1.000	4
8	Charlton Athletic	3	2	0	1	3	4	0.750	4
9	Stoke City	3	1	1	1	7	4	1.750	3
10	Manchester United	3	1	1	1	5	3	1.667	3
11	Chelsea	3	1	1	1	4	4	1.000	3
12	Brentford	3	1	1	1	3	3	1.000	3
13	Grimsby Town	3	1	1	1	2	4	0.500	3
14	Aston Villa	3	1	0	2	3	3	1.000	2
15	Sunderland	3	1	0	2	6	7	0.857	2
16	Wolverhampton Wanderers	3	0	2	1	3	4	0.750	2
17	Huddersfield Town	3	1	0	2	2	3	0.667	2
18	Portsmouth	3	1	0	2	3	5	0.600	2
19	Preston North End	3	0	2	1	0	2	0.000	2
20	Blackburn Rovers	3	0	1	2	3	5	0.600	1
21	Middlesbrough	3	0	1	2	3	8	0.375	1
22	Leeds United	3	0	1	2	0	2	0.000	1

== Results ==
Stoke's score comes first

=== Legend ===
Win	Draw	Loss

=== Football League Jubilee Fund ===
Date	Opponent	Venue	Result	Attendance	Scorers
19 August 1939	Wolverhampton Wanderers	H	2–4	6,440	Sale (2)

=== Football League First Division ===
Match	Date	Opponent	Venue	Result	Attendance	Scorers
1	26 August 1939	Charlton Athletic	H	4–0	16,268	Soo, Sale, Smith (2)
2	28 August 1939	Bolton Wanderers	H	1–2	13,067	Gallacher
3	2 September 1939	Middlesbrough	A	2–2	12,088	Sale (2)

=== West Regional Championship ===
Match	Date	Opponent	Venue	Result	Attendance	Scorers
1	21 October 1939	Everton	A	4–4	3,998	Sale (3), Liddle
2	28 October 1939	Stockport County	H	4–2	2,100	Sale, Soo, Ormston, Matthews
3	4 November 1939	Wrexham	A	4–4	3,959	Peppitt (2), Smith, Ormston
4	11 November 1939	New Brighton	H	4–1	2,401	Ormston (2), Sale (2)
5	18 November 1939	Manchester City	A	1–1	8,038	Sale (pen)
6	25 November 1939	Chester	H	2–0	1,425	Sale, Peppitt
7	2 December 1939	Crewe Alexandra	A	2–4	3,403	Sale (2)
8	9 December 1939	Liverpool	H	3–1	1,269	Sale, Liddle, Matthews
9	6 January 1940	Tranmere Rovers	H	1–0	714	Peppitt
10	20 January 1940	Manchester United	A	3–4	2,884	Peppitt, Sale, Bowyer
11	10 February 1940	Everton	H	1–0	8,910	Sale
12	24 February 1940	Stockport County	A	5–1	2,037	Peppitt (4), Soo
13	2 March 1940	Wrexham	H	3–1	2,974	Ormston (2), Steele
14	9 March 1940	New Brighton	A	1–3	1,357	Baker
15	16 March 1940	Manchester City	H	2–1	3,520	Sale, Smith
16	23 March 1940	Chester	A	3–3	4,116	Peppitt, Ormston
17	25 March 1940	Port Vale	H	5–1	9,450	Ormston (2), Sale, Own Goal (2)
18	30 March 1940	Crewe Alexandra	H	1–1	2,460	Sale
19	6 April 1940	Liverpool	A	2–1	5,130	Steele, Peppitt
20	6 May 1940	Port Vale	A	2–1	5,130	Steele, Sale
21	13 May 1940	Tranmere Rovers	A	1–5	2,434	Mountford
22	25 May 1940	Manchester United	H	3–2	3,227	Peppitt (2), Ormston

=== Football League War Cup ===
Round	Date	Opponent	Venue	Result	Attendance	Scorers
R1 1st Leg	20 April 1940	New Brighton	A	4–1	5,289	Sale, Steele (3)
R1 2nd Leg	27 April 1940	New Brighton	H	2–1	3,654	Sale, Steele
R2 1st Leg	4 May 1940	Barrow	A	2–0	11,870	Steele (2)
R2 2nd Leg	11 May 1940	Barrow	H	6–1	11,870	Steele, Sale (2), Ormston, Peppitt, Liddle
R3	18 May 1940	Everton	A	0–1	3,557	

=== Friendlies ===
Match	Date	Opponent	Venue	Result	Attendance	Scorers
1	16 September 1939	Coventry City	H	3–1	4,647	Baker, Sale, Peppitt
2	23 September 1939	Port Vale	H	3–2	4,512	Baker, Sale, Ormston
3	30 September 1939	West Bromwich Albion	A	0–6	1,515	
4	7 October 1939	Manchester United	H	2–2	3,418	Antonio, Own Goal
5	14 October 1939	Birmingham	H	3–2	2,171	Smith, Westland (2)
6	16 December 1939	Sheffield Wednesday	A	2–1	2,035	Sale, Liddle
7	25 December 1939	Bolton Wanderers	A	0–3	1,707	
8	25 December 1939	Bolton Wanderers	A	1–5	2,932	Ormston
9	30 December 1939	Bury	A	6–7	700	Sale (3), Baker, Peppitt, Matthews
10	13 January 1940	Preston North End	A	1–2	956	Sale (pen)
11	22 March 1940	Chesterfield	A	1–3	4,525	Peppitt
12	13 April 1940	Nottingham Forest	A	3–2	2,224	Sale (3)

== Squad statistics ==
Pos.	Name	Matches	
Pos.	Name	Apps	Goals
GK	(England) Pat Bridges	1	0
GK	(Wales) David Jones	19	0
GK	(Scotland) Pat McMahon	3	0
GK	(Scotland) Douglas Westland	3	0
GK	(England) Norman Wilkinson	4	0
DF	(England) Harry Brigham	30	0
DF	(England) Neil Franklin	1	0
DF	(England) Jack Griffiths	9	0
DF	(England) John McCue	1	0
DF	(England) Jimmy Oakes	4	0
DF	(England) Charlie Scrimshaw	10	0
DF	(England) Jack Tennant	5	0
MF	(England) Bobby Liddle	22	3
MF	(Scotland) Jock Kirton	8	0
MF	(England) Alfred Massey	13	0
MF	(England) Billy Mould	29	0
MF	(England) Arthur Tutin	5	0
FW	(England) George Antonio	1	0
FW	(England) Frank Baker	7	1
FW	(England) Frank Bowyer	1	0
FW	(Scotland) Patrick Gallacher	3	1
FW	(England) Stanley Matthews	19	2
FW	(England) Frank Mountford	1	1
FW	(England) Alexander Ormston	26	11
FW	(England) Syd Peppitt	25	15
FW	(England) Tommy Sale	28	24
FW	(England) Clement Smith	10	4
FW	(England) Frank Soo	28	3
FW	(England) Freddie Steele	9	10
FW	(Scotland) James Westland	1	0
