= Frank Soo =

English footballer

- Soo c. 1950

Personal information
- Full name: Frank Soo
- Date of birth: 8 March 1914
- Place of birth: Buxton, Derbyshire, England
- Date of death: 25 January 1991 (aged 76)
- Place of death: Cheadle, Staffordshire, England
- Height: 5 ft 7 1/2 in (1.71 m)
- Positions: Inside left; half-back

Youth career
- West Derby Boys Club

Senior career*
Years	Team	Apps	(Gls)
1932–1933	Prescot Cables		
1933–1945	Stoke City	173	(5)
1945–1946	Leicester City	0	(0)
1946–1948	Luton Town	71	(4)
1948–1950	Chelmsford City	71	(10)
Total		315	(19)

International career
1942–1945	England (wartime)	9	(0)

Managerial career
- 1949: Helsingin Palloseura
- 1950–1951: St Albans City
- 1951–1952: Padova
- 1952: Norway
- 1952–1953: Eskilstuna
- 1953–1954: Örebro
- 1954–1955: Djurgården
- 1956–1957: Oddevold
- 1958: AIK
- 1959–1960: Scunthorpe United
- 1961: Frigg
- 1963: IFK Stockholm
- 1964: Fredrikstad
- 1965–1966: Akademisk Boldklub
- * Club domestic league appearances and goals

Frank Soo
- Traditional Chinese: 蘇衛清
- Simplified Chinese: 苏卫清
Transcriptions
Standard Mandarin
- Hanyu Pinyin: Sū Wèiqīng
- Wade–Giles: Su Wei-ch'ing

Frank Soo (8 March 1914 – 25 January 1991) was an English professional football player and manager of mixed Chinese and English parentage. He was the first player of Chinese origin to play in the English Football League, and the first player of an ethnic minority background to represent England, though in unofficial wartime matches.

He initially began his career at inside-left, though later became more established at half-back. A quick and intelligent player, he was an excellent passer of the ball. He grew up in Liverpool and began his playing career with Prescot Cables before he joined Stoke City for a £400 fee in January 1933. He made his first-team debut in November 1933 and became established in the first-team by the 1935–36 season. He lost most of his best playing years to World War II, leaving him only able to serve in the Royal Air Force and play for Stoke and England in unofficial wartime games, as well as guest for numerous other clubs. He was sold to Leicester City for a fee of £4,600 in September 1945 and then moved on to Luton Town 10 months later for £5,000. He joined Chelmsford City of the Southern League in May 1948 and retired as a player after two seasons.

A stern task master, he began to coach for European clubs in the 1950s and early 1960s. He briefly coached Finnish club Helsingin Palloseura in 1949 before taking charge at Isthmian League side St Albans City for the 1950–51 season. He was appointed manager of the Italian Serie A club Padova in April 1951 but left the club 11 months later following the sudden death of his wife. He then coached Norway at the 1952 Summer Olympics, then led Eskilstuna to promotion out of the Swedish Division 3 Östra in 1952–53. He briefly managed Örebro before he coached Djurgården to the Allsvenskan title in 1954–55. He then returned to lower league football with Oddevold, securing promotion out of Division 3 Nordvästra Götaland in 1955–56. He coached at AIK in 1958 before returning to England to manage Scunthorpe United in June 1959. He took Scunthorpe to 15th in the Second Division in the 1959–60 season before he resigned in May 1960. From there, he struggled to find work, spending short periods in charge at Frigg (Norway), IFK Stockholm (Sweden), Fredrikstad (Norway), and Akademisk Boldklub (Denmark).

== Personal life ==
Frank Soo was born in Buxton, Derbyshire on 8 March 1914, and brought up in Liverpool. His parents, a Liverpool-based Chinese sailor father, Our Quong Soo (Chinese: 區君仕; also Ah Kwong Soo), and an English mother, Beatrice Whittam, had married in Chorlton, Manchester in 1908. The couple had moved to the village of Fairfield to open a laundry, as was commonly done by Chinese emigrants in England at the time, before eventually moving premises to West Derby, Liverpool around 1920. He had an elder brother, Norman, and several younger siblings: Phyllis, Ronald, Jack, Harold and Kenneth. His brother, Ronald, was killed on 14 January 1944 while serving as an air gunner in No. 166 Squadron.

Soo married hairdressing salon proprietor Beryl Freda Lunt in Stoke-on-Trent on 12 June 1938. The couple honeymooned in Bournemouth. Freda, as she was known, was a keen autograph hunter and had initially introduced herself to Soo to ask for his signature. The couple separated in 1951, and Freda died as a result of a barbiturate overdose on 10 March 1952; it was not known whether her death was intentional or accidental.

== Playing career ==
=== Stoke City ===
Soo played for Norwood, West Derby and West Derby Boys' Club and was scouted by both Everton and Liverpool without ever being signed by either club. He instead began his senior career with Cheshire League side Prescot Cables in late 1932, whilst working as an office clerk. He was quickly signed by Stoke City for a £400 fee on 25 January 1933, after being spotted by the club's scouts. Tom Mather handed Soo his debut at the expense of Harry Ware after picking him to play inside-left against Middlesbrough at Ayresome Park on 4 November 1933, making him the first player of Chinese descent to play in the Football League; the match ended in a 6–1 defeat. Despite the heavy defeat, he was praised as Stoke's stand-out performer. He kept his place for the 1–0 defeat to Manchester City at the Victoria Ground seven days later. He made a third appearance in a loss to Arsenal at Highbury, before being dropped for six matches. He scored his first goal in professional football on 3 January 1934, as Stoke beat Bradford Park Avenue 3–0 in the third round of the FA Cup, and then scored again as Stoke defeated Blackpool by the same scoreline in the following round 24 days later. He scored his first league goal for the "Potters" on 29 January, concluding the scoring in a 3–0 victory over Huddersfield Town. He made a total of 16 appearances during the 1933–34 season, scoring three goals, as Stoke posted a 12th-place finish in the First Division.

Soo featured mainly for the Reserves during the 1934–35 campaign, as the forward line of Harry Davies, Joe Johnson, Bobby Liddle, Stanley Matthews and Tommy Sale proved to be highly effective, scoring 60 of the club's 71 league goals on the way to a tenth-place finish. He failed to make a first-team appearance between September and 9 March, only returning to the side following a run of three consecutive defeats. He broke his leg during 1935–36 pre-season training, but made a speedy recovery to feature in a 2–0 defeat to Liverpool at Anfield on 18 September. He found himself a first-team regular under new manager Bob McGrory, who utilised him as a left-sided half-back in the place of ageing veteran Harry Sellars. Playing alongside Arthur Turner and Arthur Tutin, Soo would be a part of one of the club's great half-back lines. He played a total of 40 matches that season, helping Stoke to a fourth-place finish, the highest in the club's history.

Stoke were inconsistent across the 1936–37 season, recording a 10–3 victory over West Bromwich Albion (a game which Soo missed due to injury) in the middle of a run of eight defeats in 11 league fixtures. Soo made 31 appearances, as City finished in tenth place. Soo scored four goals from 45 appearances during the 1937–38 campaign and played at centre-forward on two occasions in November due to injuries to Freddie Steele and James Westland. However, Stoke struggled again, falling to 17th-place in the league and being knocked out of the FA Cup by Bradford Park Avenue. Soo succeeded Turner as acting club captain in March 1938 and was formally named as captain in the summer.

In October 1938, Stoke rejected a bid from Brentford of £5,000 for Soo. Stoke recovered from a poor start to the 1938–39 season to finish in seventh-place, with Soo scoring three goals from 44 appearances, sometimes being asked to play out of position due to injuries to other players. His name was put forward in numerous newspapers for selection in the England team, with the Daily Express stating that "Soo, of Stoke, is one of the finest halves in the game, and it would be no less than he was worth if they put him in". However, he lost the chance to represent England due to the outbreak of World War II, which had also caused Stoke City to cancel their planned 1939 summer tour of Germany and Poland, and then led the Football League to cancel the 1939–40 season after just three matches. Before the league was suspended, Soo's midfield partnership with Turner and Tutin – with Matthews and Steele in attack – had made Stoke one of the favourites for that season's league title.

=== World War II ===
Soo initially found work in the engineering department of the Michelin tyre company in Stoke-on-Trent, which allowed him to play wartime matches for Stoke City. Throughout the war he played at full-back, right half-back, left-half-back and inside-left, filling in as need be as team-mates would be unavailable for selection due to service or work commitments. He also appeared for Newcastle United, Blackburn Rovers, Everton, Chelsea, Reading, Brentford, Port Vale, Crewe Alexandra, Millwall, and Burnley, and played nine times for the England national football team between 1942 and 1945 (in Wartime and Victory Internationals), the first non-white person ever to play for the national team (albeit in semi-official matches only) and the only person of East Asian descent to date. He also played for several FA representative teams not officially described as "England". He played mainly for Stoke City however, scoring three goals in 28 appearances in the 1939–40 season as Stoke won the War League West Regional Championship. He then scored four goals from 18 matches in 1940–41.

He was called up to the Royal Air Force (RAF) on 28 July 1941 and spent most of his time in the RAF working in the technical training of aircrews. As time went on, he was based further away from Stoke and became unable to play for the club; he scored three goals from 12 appearances in 1941–42 and four goals from 13 matches in 1942–43, before he was stripped of the captaincy. He played just two games for Stoke in 1943–44 and scored three goals from eight games in 1944–45. In April 1945, Soo submitted a transfer request after growing tensions between himself and McGrory due to his lack of availability and his frustrations at being played out of position by McGrory, who also had a similarly tense relationship with star player Stanley Matthews.

=== Leicester City ===
On 27 September 1945, Soo was sold to Leicester City for a fee of £4,600, rejoining the manager who had signed him for Stoke, Tom Mather. He was named as the "Foxes" new club captain less than two weeks later. However, Leicester struggled in the 1945–46 season, and he was transfer-listed in January despite being one of the better performers at Filbert Street. He was demobilised from the RAF on 26 April 1946.

=== Luton Town ===
Soo joined Luton Town in July 1946 for a fee of £5,000. The "Hatters" started the 1946–47 season poorly, losing eight matches by mid-November. However, after going three goals down to league leaders Newcastle United, manager George Martin gave what Soo described as "the most unusual pep talk I have ever heard" and inspired a 4–3 comeback victory. Luton went on to finish the season 13th in the Second Division, with Soo making 38 league and four FA Cup appearances. He then scored five goals in 36 appearances in the 1947–48 season, though new manager Dally Duncan could not take Luton above 13th place, and he allowed Soo to leave Kenilworth Road in the summer.

=== Chelmsford City ===
On 28 May 1948, Soo signed with Chelmsford City from Luton for a reported "substantial transfer fee". He was appointed as club captain and as a coach and helped Arthur Rowe's "Clarets" to finish second in the Southern League in 1948–49, before being transfer-listed in the summer after failing to agree terms with the club. He spent the summer coaching Finnish club Helsingin Palloseura. Rowe left to manage Tottenham Hotspur and Soo applied to succeed him as Chelmsford manager, but lost out to Jack Tresadern. He submitted a transfer request in November 1949 so as to try and find a club closer to his wife's family home in Stoke-on-Trent following her father's death, and also due to increasing tensions between himself, Tresadern, and the club's board of directors. Kidderminster Harriers offered Chelmsford £1,000 for his services, but Soo refused to join the club. He was forced to play for Chelmsford Reserves as the dispute rumbled on, before he was reinstated in the first-team in January following outcry from the club's supporters. City finished in fourth-place at the end of the 1949–50 season, and though Soo was named on the club's retained list he instead retired as a player to join St Albans City as manager on 30 May 1950.

== Style of play ==
Soo was quick and intelligent and was noted for his ability to deliver perfectly placed passes. Stan Mortensen wrote in his autobiography, Football Is My Game, that Soo was one of the four best wing-halves he ever played with (alongside George Farrow, Billy Wright and Harry Sellars), and "seemed incapable of a clumsy movement". Arsenal's Alex James described him as "modern for his time".

== Managerial career ==
=== Padova ===
Soo spent the summer of 1949 coaching the Finnish club Helsingin Palloseura before entering management full-time at Isthmian League side St Albans City in May 1950. He led the "Saints" to a ninth-place finish at the end of the 1950–51 season. On 12 April 1951, he was appointed as manager of Italian club Padova following Giovanni Ferrari's dismissal as manager. The press had accused the "Patavini" players of laziness, and Soo's reputation as a stern taskmaster was seen as a good solution. Padova beat Napoli 2–0 on the final day of the 1950–51 season to avoid relegation out of Serie A, and finished just a point ahead of 19th-placed Roma. His main summer signing was Norwegian player Knut Andersen, though the transfer was only completed in December when clearance from the Scandinavian Federation was confirmed; on Andersen's debut Padova managed to beat reigning champions Milan 5–2 at the Stadio Silvio Appiani. However, the team struggled in the second half of the 1951–52 season, and Soo left the club on 13 March to return to England following his wife's death; Gastone Prendato was named as his successor at Padova, but could not keep the club out of the relegation zone by the end of the season.

=== Scandinavia ===
He signed a one-year contract to manage Swedish club Eskilstuna in May 1952, but took charge of the side after first working as head coach of the Norway national football team for the 1952 Summer Olympics in Helsinki. He took charge of just one match, as Norway were defeated 4–1 by neighbours and reigning gold medallists Sweden in the first round of the tournament. Returning to Eskilstuna, he told the press that he wanted to initiate a new playing style of "long, sweeping passes", and in addition to coaching the first-team he also took charge of the youth team and coached at local Eskilstuna schools. He also initiated a total ban on alcohol for his players, which some in the media criticised as totalitarian and unnecessary. The club finished third in the Östra region of Division 3 in 1952–53, but were promoted into Division 2 due to a re-organisation of the league system.

Soo was appointed manager of newly relegated Division 2 Svealand club Örebro in 1953, however, soon became unpopular with some players in his new dressing room due to his strict training methods. Despite his apparent unpopularity, he still managed to take the club to a second-place finish at the end of the 1953–54 season, one place ahead of Eskilstuna. He again did not stay long though. He was appointed as manager at Allsvenskan club Djurgården in June 1954, succeeding Welshman Dai Astley. He was also linked with the Sweden national team job, but the SvFF opted not to appoint a full-time manager following failure to qualify for the 1954 FIFA World Cup. He instead accepted a post as part-time coach of Sweden, still to be officially managed by a committee, but left the post following heavy defeats to the Soviet Union and Hungary. Back at Djurgården, his physical style of play proved to be highly effective, and he led the "Blåränderna" to the league title at the end of the 1954–55 season, after which he tendered his resignation.

Soo was appointed manager of Division 3 Nordvästra Götaland club Oddevold on 21 February 1956 and led the club to promotion as runners-up of their region in 1955–56. However, the team struggled in the Västra Götaland region of Division 2 in the 1956–57 campaign, and Soo left the club in February 1957; his successor, Sven-Ove Svensson, led the club to an eighth-place finish. In December 1957, he was appointed as trainer at Allsvenskan club AIK, working alongside former Sweden selection committee chairman Putte Kock. However, he soon caused controversy after trying to focus his players primarily on football, which angered bandy playing twins Bengt and Björn Anlert. The "Gnaget" finished ninth in 1957–58, and Soo and the players suffered a difficult relationship.

=== Scunthorpe United ===
On 8 June 1959, Soo returned to England and was appointed manager of Second Division club Scunthorpe United, and immediately came under fire from vice-chairman Doug Drury, who said the club could not afford Soo's £1,600-a-year salary. He signed defender Dennis John, winger Martin Bakes and centre-forward Barrie Thomas; Thomas went on to score 26 goals as the "Iron" recorded a 15th-place finish at the end of the 1959–60 season. Writing in February 1960, Ipswich Town manager Alf Ramsey described Scunthorpe as "one of the most improved clubs in the country, since manager Frank Soo took over the reins at the Old Showground at the start of the season, the football produced by this little club has at times matched the best". However, Soo resigned in May 1960.

=== Later career ===
In 1961, Soo returned to Scandinavia and managed Frigg in Oslo, the capital of Norway, for one season. Two years later Soo was appointed manager of the Israel national team and was due to take charge in October 1963, but a last-minute disagreement between himself and the Israel Football Association meant that he never formally took charge of the team. The job instead went to George Ainsley. He subsequently returned to Scandinavia and briefly took charge at IFK Stockholm before he was appointed manager of Norwegian First Division club Fredrikstad in January 1964. He had a "short and turbulent" reign, again finding his players resentful of his prohibition of alcohol, and led the club to a second-place finish in 1964, before he resigned on 15 December 1964. In November 1965, he was appointed manager of Danish 1st Division club Akademisk Boldklub, and led the "Akademikerne" to fifth-place and sixth-place finishes in 1965 and 1966. However, by this time he had established a reputation as a manager who was difficult to work with, highly demanding both in what he asked of his players and what he asked for financially, and someone who very quickly moved on. He remained in Sweden for the rest of the 1960s, though nearly made a return to coaching with the Hong Kong national team in April 1972, though did not take up the post as the HKFA were only prepared to offer him a one-year contract. He returned to Stoke-on-Trent by the 1980s, and later died due to complications of dementia at a cottage hospital in Cheadle on 25 January 1991.

== Style of management ==
In an interview with the Swedish newspaper Fotboll, Soo said "usually I run with the boys for 90-minutes. Then I try to make that time as intense as possible... I want them to be tired after training". He was described as a slavdrivare (slave driver).

== Legacy ==
A street was named after him on what used to be the site of the Victoria Ground in Stoke. The Frank Soo Foundation was created in Soo's honour in 2016, the aim of which is to promote his story, continue his legacy and encourage more people from East and South East Asian backgrounds to participate in football. An annual five-a-side charity football tournament is held in his honour, with the Player of the Tournament award being named after him. The Frank Soo Cup is also held every year for 9-a-side teams in collaboration with county FAs encouraging grassroots participation.

On 8 May 2020, to commemorate the anniversary of his first England cap, Soo was honoured by Google with a Doodle. On 3 November 2023, Soo was inducted into the Stoke-on-Trent Sporting Hall of Fame to mark 90 years since his debut for Stoke City. On 2 November 2024, Soo was also inducted into the National Football Museums Hall of Fame. A campaign lobbying the FA to award Soo with a posthumous honorary England cap was launched shortly after.

On 9 October 2025, Frank Soo's family and the Frank Soo Foundation were awarded a posthumous honorary England cap by the FA during the England vs Wales match at Wembley Stadium.

On 10 July 2026, Historic England unveiled a blue plaque to Soo on the house where he was born, 11 Lightwood Road, Buxton, Derbyshire.

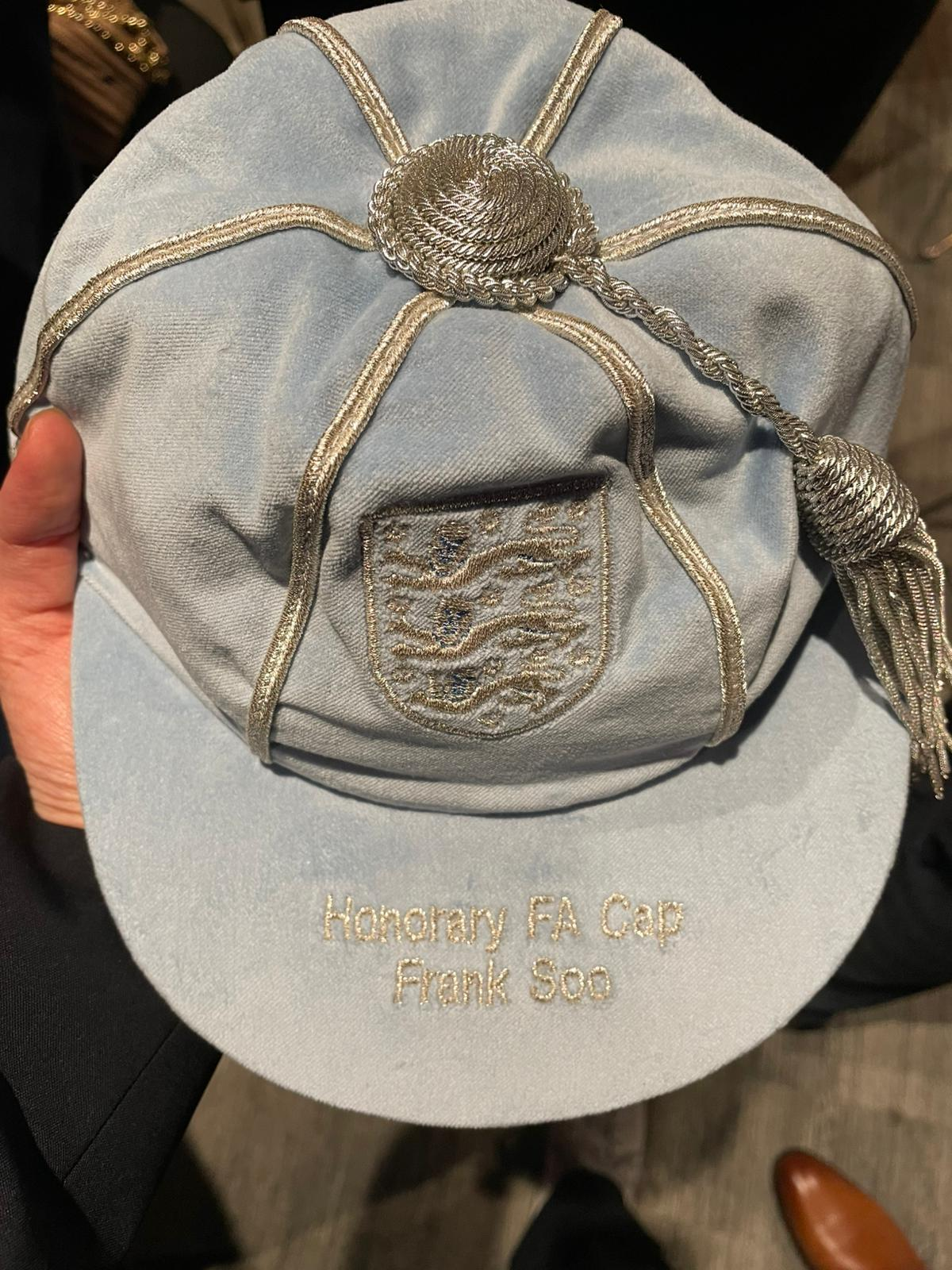
Frank Soo's honorary England cap.

== Career statistics ==
=== Playing statistics ===
Appearances and goals by club, season and competition
Club	Season	League			FA Cup		Total	
Club	Season	Division	Apps	Goals	Apps	Goals	Apps	Goals
Stoke City	1933–34	First Division	14	1	2	2	16	3
Stoke City	1934–35	First Division	9	0	0	0	9	0
Stoke City	1935–36	First Division	35	0	5	0	40	0
Stoke City	1936–37	First Division	31	0	0	0	31	0
Stoke City	1937–38	First Division	42	2	3	2	45	4
Stoke City	1938–39	First Division	42	2	2	1	44	3
Stoke City	Total		173	5	12	5	185	10
Leicester City	1945–46	War League	0	0	2	0	2	0
Luton Town	1946–47	Second Division	38	0	4	0	42	0
Luton Town	1947–48	Second Division	33	4	3	1	36	5
Luton Town	Total		71	4	7	1	78	5
Career total			244	9	21	6	265	15

=== Managerial statistics ===
Managerial record by team and tenure
Team	From	To	Record				
Team	From	To	P	W	D	L	Win %
Norway	June 1952	July 1952	1	0	0	1	0.0
Scunthorpe United	June 1959	May 1960	44	14	10	20	31.8
Total			45	14	10	21	31.1

== Honours ==
Eskilstuna

- Division 3 Östra promotion: 1952–53

Djurgården

- Allsvenskan: 1954–55

Oddevold

- Division 3 Nordvästra Götaland promotion: 1955–56
