= Clement Smith (footballer) =

English footballer

Personal information
- Full name: Clement Smith
- Date of birth: 28 June 1910
- Place of birth: Wath-upon-Dearne, England
- Date of death: 1970 (aged 60)
- Height: 5 ft 7 in (1.70 m)
- Position: Inside right

Senior career*
Years	Team	Apps	(Gls)
?–1935	South Kirkby		
1935–1936	Halifax Town	55	(12)
1937	Chester	26	(3)
1937–1939	Stoke City	25	(7)
Total		106	(22)
- * Club domestic league appearances and goals

Clement Smith (28 June 1910 – 1970) was an English footballer who played in the Football League for Chester, Halifax Town and Stoke City

== Career ==
Born in Wath-upon-Dearne, England Smith started his football career with South Kirkby, where his goals lead the club to the final of the Yorkshire League Cup where South Kirkby faced Halifax Town, who promptly signed him. He spent two years with the "Shaymen" before joining Chester in 1937 for £1,000. He impressed at Chester which led to Stoke City paying £2,000 for Smith's services to provide back up for Freddie Steele and George Antonio. He made 25 appearances for Stoke scoring seven goals. After the league was cancelled due to World War II Smith decided to retire from football.

== Career statistics ==
Appearances and goals by club, season and competition
Club	Season	League			FA Cup		Total	
Club	Season	Division	Apps	Goals	Apps	Goals	Apps	Goals
Halifax Town	1935–36	Third Division North	23	3	0	0	23	3
Halifax Town	1936–37	Third Division North	32	9	1	0	33	9
Halifax Town	Total		55	12	1	0	56	12
Chester	1937–38	Third Division North	26	3	1	0	27	0
Stoke City	1937–38	First Division	5	1	0	0	5	1
Stoke City	1938–39	First Division	20	6	0	0	20	6
Stoke City	Total		25	7	0	0	25	7
Career total			106	22	2	0	108	22
