= Syd Fursland =

Welsh footballer

Personal information
- Full name: Sydney Albert Fursland
- Date of birth: 31 July 1914
- Place of birth: Llwynypia, Wales
- Date of death: 1990 (aged 76)
- Height: 5 ft 6 in (1.68 m)
- Position: Forward

Senior career*
Years	Team	Apps	(Gls)
1933–1934	Cardiff City	2	(0)
1935	Bangor City		
1935–1938	Stoke City	4	(1)
- * Club domestic league appearances and goals

Sydney Albert Fursland (31 July 1914 – 1990) was a Welsh footballer who played in the English Football League for Cardiff City and Stoke City.

== Career ==
Fursland was born in Llwynypia and began his career with Cardiff City and made two appearances for the "Bluebirds" during the 1933–34 season. He left for Welsh League side Bangor City in November 1934 and returned to league football with Stoke City in August 1935. He was only give a reserve player role by manager Bob McGrory playing four matches in three seasons scoring once against Huddersfield Town in November 1936.

== Career statistics ==
Appearances and goals by club, season and competition
Club	Season	League			FA Cup		Total	
Club	Season	Division	Apps	Goals	Apps	Goals	Apps	Goals
Cardiff City	1933–34	Third Division South	2	0	0	0	2	0
Stoke City	1935–36	First Division	1	0	0	0	1	0
Stoke City	1936–37	First Division	2	1	0	0	2	1
Stoke City	1937–38	First Division	0	0	0	0	0	0
Stoke City	1938–39	First Division	1	0	0	0	1	0
Career total			6	1	0	0	6	1
