= Glassey =

Glassey is a surname. Notable people with the surname include:

- Alec Glassey (1887–1970), British Liberal politician
- Betty Glassey, Papua New Guinea international lawn bowler
- Bob Glassey (1916–1984), footballer
- Francis Patrick Glassey, performer
- Thomas Glassey (1844–1936), Irish-born Australian politician
