= Stoke City F.C. league record by opponent =

Stoke City Football Club is an English association football club based in Stoke-on-Trent. Founded as Stoke Ramblers Football Club in 1863, the club changed its name to Stoke Football Club in 1868 and then added the word "City" in 1927. During the 1888–89 season, Stoke joined the Football League and after a period in non-league football prior to World War I Stoke remained there until 2008 when Stoke gained promotion Premier League.

Stoke City are founder members of the Football League, which was created in 1888. Over the years Stoke have played in the First Division, Second Division, Third Division, Third Division North, Championship, Football Alliance, Birmingham & District League and Southern League. Since 2018, Stoke compete in the second tier of English football, the EFL Championship.

Stoke's first opponent was West Bromwich Albion in September 1888 who defeated the Potters 2–0. Albion is also the opponent Stoke have played the most often in League matches, and against which they have recorded the most wins. The most league defeats inflicted upon City are by Liverpool and Sunderland, while the most drawn matches have come against Derby County.

== Key ==
- The records include the results of matches played in The Football League (from 1888 to 1890, 1891 to 1907, 1919 to 2008) Football Alliance (from 1890 to 1891) and the Premier League (since 2008). Wartime matches are regarded as unofficial and are excluded, as are matches from the abandoned 1939–40 seasons. Football League play-offs, Test Matches and cup matches are not included.
- For the sake of simplicity, present-day names are used throughout: for example, results against Ardwick, Small Heath and Woolwich Arsenal are integrated into the records against Manchester City, Birmingham City and Arsenal, respectively.
- † Teams with this background and symbol in the "Club" column are current divisional rivals of Stoke City.
- ‡ Clubs with this background and symbol in the "Club" column are defunct.
- Pld = matches played; W = matches won; D = matches drawn; L = matches lost; GF = Goals for; GA = Goals against; Win% = percentage of total matches won

== All-time league record ==
Statistics correct as of end of the 2025–26 season.

Stoke City F.C. league record by opponent
Opponent	Pld	W	D	L	Pld	W	D	L	Pld	W	D	L	GF	GA	Win%	Ref(s)
Opponent	Home				Away				Total						Win%	Ref(s)
Accrington ‡	4	2	1	1	4	0	0	4	8	2	1	5	17	20	25%	
Accrington Stanley (old) ‡	1	2	0	0	1	0	0	0	2	2	0	0	2	0	100%	
Arsenal	47	20	16	11	47	5	5	37	94	25	21	46	85	149	27%	
Aston Villa	53	22	16	15	53	9	12	32	106	31	27	47	126	181	29%	
Barnsley	30	16	10	4	30	5	7	17	60	21	18	21	84	79	35%	
Barrow	1	1	0	0	1	0	1	0	2	1	1	0	4	0	50%	
Birmingham City †	50	29	11	10	50	12	13	25	100	42	24	36	129	116	42%	
Birmingham St George's ‡	1	1	0	0	1	0	0	1	2	1	0	1	8	8	50%	
Blackpool	33	14	9	10	33	11	10	12	66	25	19	22	95	83	36%	
Blackburn Rovers †	50	29	9	12	50	12	8	30	100	41	17	41	141	163	41%	
Bolton Wanderers	41	22	7	12	41	8	13	20	82	30	20	32	128	117	37%	
Bootle ‡	1	1	0	0	1	0	1	0	2	1	1	0	4	3	50%	
Bournemouth	15	8	2	5	15	4	5	6	30	12	7	11	34	33	40%	
Bradford City	20	14	4	2	20	4	5	11	40	18	9	13	57	49	45%	
Bradford Park Avenue	7	4	2	1	7	1	2	4	14	5	4	5	22	19	36%	
Brentford	14	10	4	0	14	3	5	6	28	13	9	6	45	29	46%	
Brighton & Hove Albion	20	9	8	3	20	6	8	6	40	15	16	9	55	39	38%	
Bristol City †	31	18	5	8	31	10	10	11	62	28	15	18	91	76	45%	
Bristol Rovers	14	8	1	5	14	2	3	9	28	10	4	14	43	50	36%	
Burnley	49	26	10	13	49	13	14	22	98	39	24	36	146	131	40%	
Bury	32	20	4	8	32	10	6	16	64	30	10	24	103	82	47%	
Cambridge United	5	2	1	2	5	3	1	1	10	5	2	3	17	12	50%	
Cardiff City	26	10	9	6	26	7	6	12	52	18	15	19	62	64	35%	
Carlisle United	2	1	1	0	2	1	0	1	4	2	1	1	7	5	50%	
Charlton Athletic †	31	19	7	5	31	7	5	19	62	26	12	23	94	93	42%	
Chelsea	44	17	8	19	44	7	11	26	88	24	19	44	108	142	26%	
Chester City ‡	3	1	0	0	3	0	3	2	6	1	3	2	8	6	17%	
Chesterfield	7	5	2	0	7	5	2	0	14	10	4	0	29	13	71%	
Colchester United	6	4	2	0	6	4	0	2	12	8	2	2	21	12	67%	
Coventry City †	33	17	4	12	33	10	7	16	66	27	11	28	93	90	41%	
Crewe Alexandra	6	4	1	1	6	4	0	2	12	8	1	3	15	10	67%	
Crystal Palace	28	10	8	10	28	7	4	17	56	16	12	27	62	82	30%	
Darlington ‡	2	2	0	0	2	2	0	0	4	4	0	0	12	2	100%	
Darwen ‡	3	3	0	0	3	0	1	2	6	3	1	2	21	19	33%	
Derby County†	68	33	22	18	68	10	19	39	136	43	41	51	175	223	32%	
Doncaster Rovers	6	2	4	0	6	2	1	3	12	4	5	3	18	16	33%	
Everton	62	22	21	19	62	10	12	40	124	32	33	58	131	210	26%	
Exeter City	3	2	1	0	3	0	2	1	6	2	3	1	10	8	33%	
Fulham	38	18	8	12	38	10	7	21	76	28	15	33	106	107	37%	
Gainsborough Trinity	1	1	0	0	1	0	0	1	2	1	0	1	5	2	50%	
Gillingham	5	1	4	0	5	0	1	4	10	1	5	4	6	14	10%	
Glossop North End	2	2	0	0	2	1	0	1	4	3	0	1	7	3	75%	
Grimsby Town	26	16	6	4	26	6	10	10	52	22	16	14	84	55	42%	
Halifax Town ‡	1	1	0	0	1	0	1	0	2	1	1	0	7	3	50%	
Hartlepool United	3	2	0	1	3	2	1	0	6	4	1	1	12	7	67%	
Huddersfield Town	39	19	13	7	39	10	13	16	78	29	26	23	118	96	37%	
Hull City †	37	18	11	8	37	15	9	13	74	33	20	20	102	77	46%	
Ipswich Town †	37	16	13	8	37	9	8	20	74	24	21	28	97	108	34%	
Leeds City ‡	1	1	0	0	1	1	0	0	2	2	0	0	3	1	50%	
Leeds United	46	23	7	16	46	6	11	29	92	29	18	44	128	152	32%	
Leicester City †	45	22	14	9	45	6	16	23	90	28	30	32	111	128	31%	
Leyton Orient	20	11	2	7	20	7	1	12	40	18	3	19	57	49	45%	
Lincoln City	13	10	2	1	13	7	2	4	26	17	4	5	63	29	65%	
Liverpool	63	27	20	16	63	3	13	47	126	30	33	63	132	206	24%	
Luton Town	24	11	8	5	24	10	7	7	48	21	15	12	72	60	44%	
Macclesfield Town ‡	1	1	0	0	1	0	1	0	2	1	1	0	4	2	50%	
Manchester City	49	25	11	13	49	7	12	30	98	32	22	42	108	141	33%	
Manchester United	45	17	15	13	45	5	14	26	90	22	29	39	106	145	24%	
Mansfield Town	3	2	1	0	3	1	1	1	6	3	2	1	13	4	50%	
Middlesbrough †	53	28	12	13	53	8	13	32	106	36	25	45	130	152	34%	
Millwall †	28	13	7	8	28	6	7	15	56	19	14	23	52	62	34%	
Nelson	2	2	0	0	2	0	0	2	4	2	0	2	8	4	50%	
New Brighton ‡	1	0	1	0	1	0	0	1	2	0	1	1	1	6	0%	
Newcastle United	41	22	10	9	41	4	9	28	82	26	19	37	96	132	32%	
Northampton Town	4	3	1	0	4	1	2	1	8	4	3	1	18	9	50%	
Norwich City †	31	15	10	6	31	5	10	16	62	20	20	22	74	82	32%	
Nottingham Forest	53	19	17	17	53	13	15	25	106	32	32	32	132	154	30%	
Notts County	37	16	10	11	37	10	11	16	74	26	21	27	91	90	35%	
Oldham Athletic	26	9	8	9	26	6	5	15	52	15	13	24	62	74	29%	
Oxford United †	9	4	3	2	9	1	2	6	18	5	5	8	21	26	28%	
Peterborough United	5	4	1	0	5	2	3	0	10	6	4	0	22	8	60%	
Plymouth Argyle	21	14	7	0	21	6	6	9	42	20	13	9	54	46	48%	
Preston North End †	55	24	15	16	55	12	11	32	110	36	26	48	146	184	33%	
Portsmouth †	32	17	6	9	32	6	8	18	64	22	14	26	82	93	36%	
Port Vale	22	9	6	7	22	7	9	6	44	16	15	13	44	39	36%	
Queens Park Rangers †	25	11	4	10	25	4	9	12	50	15	13	21	52	65	30%	
Reading	27	14	7	6	27	5	10	12	54	19	16	18	74	64	35%	
Rochdale	1	1	0	0	1	0	0	1	2	1	0	1	3	5	50%	
Rotherham United	24	13	4	7	24	7	11	6	48	20	15	13	77	57	42%	
Scunthorpe United	7	5	0	2	7	2	5	0	14	7	5	2	24	18	50%	
Sheffield United†	54	23	14	17	54	11	15	28	108	34	29	45	152	156	31%	
Sheffield Wednesday †	45	22	10	13	45	11	11	23	90	33	21	36	118	124	37%	
Shrewsbury Town	6	2	3	1	6	2	0	4	12	4	3	5	12	15	33%	
Southampton †	38	19	9	10	38	11	6	21	76	30	13	32	104	108	39%	
Southend United	6	3	1	2	6	1	1	4	12	4	2	6	18	15	33%	
Southport	1	1	0	0	1	1	0	0	2	2	0	0	7	0	100%	
South Shields ‡	4	2	4	1	7	1	3	3	14	2	7	4	13	19	21%	
Stockport County	10	7	2	1	10	2	3	5	20	9	5	6	24	20	45%	
Sunderland	72	36	16	20	72	9	17	46	144	43	32	66	156	207	31%	
Sunderland Albion ‡	1	0	1	0	1	0	1	0	2	0	2	0	2	2	0%	
Swansea City †	38	24	9	5	38	9	12	17	76	33	21	21	133	95	43%	
Swindon Town	8	5	2	1	8	3	0	5	16	8	2	6	20	19	50%	
Torquay United	1	1	0	0	1	0	0	1	2	1	0	1	3	1	50%	
Tottenham Hotspur	43	18	9	16	43	3	9	31	86	21	18	47	92	150	24%	
Tranmere Rovers	8	3	2	3	8	2	4	2	16	5	6	5	15	17	31%	
Walsall	8	6	1	1	8	2	2	4	16	8	3	5	22	20	50%	
Watford †	21	9	4	8	21	7	4	10	42	16	8	18	44	52	38%	
West Bromwich Albion †	76	37	23	16	76	26	16	34	152	63	38	48	218	202	41%	
West Ham United	40	21	8	11	40	7	15	18	80	29	21	28	94	108	35%	
Wigan Athletic	17	7	6	4	17	4	7	6	34	11	13	10	42	47	32%	
Wigan Borough ‡	1	1	0	0	1	1	0	0	2	2	0	0	5	0	100%	
Wimbledon ‡	3	2	1	0	3	1	1	1	6	3	2	1	6	4	50%	
Wrexham †	7	6	0	1	7	6	0	1	14	12	0	2	27	11	86%	
Wolverhampton Wanderers	70	35	14	21	70	14	19	37	140	49	33	58	195	217	35%	
Wycombe Wanderers	5	2	3	0	5	4	0	1	10	6	3	1	17	5	60%	
York City	1	1	0	0	1	0	1	0	2	0	1	0	4	2	50%	
