= Bill Winstanley =

English footballer

Personal information
- Full name: William Ira Winstanley
- Date of birth: 26 October 1911
- Place of birth: Prestwich, England
- Date of death: 1985 (aged 74)
- Height: 5 ft 9 1/2 in (1.77 m)
- Position: Right back

Senior career*
Years	Team	Apps	(Gls)
- Altrincham
1935–1938	Stoke City	48	(0)
–	Trafford Park		
- * Club domestic league appearances and goals

William Ira Winstanley (26 October 1911 – 1985) was an English footballer who played in the Football League for Stoke City.

== Career ==
Winstanley was born in Prestwich and played for Cheshire League side Altrincham before earning a move to Stoke City in 1935. He made an instant impression on new manager Bob McGrory he played 31 matches in 1935–36 and then 21 in 1936–37. He suffered a broken leg on Christmas Day in 1936 playing against Chelsea and he missed more than a year playing once in 1938–39. He was never able to force his way back into the first team and once World War II commenced he returned to Manchester and played for Trafford Park.

== Career statistics ==
Club	Season	League			FA Cup		Total	
Club	Season	Division	Apps	Goals	Apps	Goals	Apps	Goals
Stoke City	1935–36	First Division	26	0	5	0	31	0
Stoke City	1936–37	First Division	21	0	0	0	21	0
Stoke City	1937–38	First Division	0	0	0	0	0	0
Stoke City	1938–39	First Division	1	0	0	0	1	0
Career Total			48	0	5	0	53	0
