= Harbot =

Harbot is a surname. Notable people with the surname include:

- Albert Harbot (1896–1968), English badminton player
- James Harbot (1907–1992), English footballer
