= Clewlow =

Clewlow is a surname. Notable people with the surname include:

- Frank Clewlow (1885–1957), English-born Australian actor and theatre director
- Melanie Clewlow (born 1976), English field hockey player
- Sid Clewlow (1919–1989), English footballer
