= John Bamber (footballer, born 1912) =

English footballer

Personal information
- Full name: John Belfield Bamber
- Date of birth: 8 June 1912
- Place of birth: Preston, England
- Date of death: 2000 (aged 88)
- Height: 5 ft 11 in (1.80 m)
- Position: Centre half

Senior career*
Years	Team	Apps	(Gls)
1931	Preston North End	0	(0)
1932	Fleetwood Town		
1933–1938	Stoke City	24	(1)
- * Club domestic league appearances and goals

John Belfield Bamber (8 June 1912 – 2000) was an English footballer who played in the Football League for Stoke City.

== Career ==
Bamber was born in Preston and played for his local club, Preston North End. He failed to break into the team at Deepdale and left for non-league Fleetwood Town before signing for Stoke City in 1933. He made a perfect start to his Stoke career scoring on his debut against Leicester City in December. Despite this however, Bamber soon became used as a reserve player and he went on to spend six seasons at the Victoria Ground making just 24 appearances.

== Career statistics ==
Appearances and goals by club, season and competition
Club	Season	League			FA Cup		Total	
Club	Season	Division	Apps	Goals	Apps	Goals	Apps	Goals
Stoke City	1933–34	First Division	2	1	0	0	2	1
Stoke City	1934–35	First Division	3	0	0	0	3	0
Stoke City	1935–36	First Division	0	0	0	0	0	0
Stoke City	1936–37	First Division	0	0	0	0	0	0
Stoke City	1937–38	First Division	6	0	0	0	6	0
Stoke City	1938–39	First Division	13	0	0	0	13	0
Career total			24	1	0	0	24	1
