= Billy Robson =

English footballer

Personal information
- Full name: William Paisley Robson
- Date of birth: 20 December 1907
- Place of birth: Newcastle upon Tyne, England
- Date of death: 1985 (aged 78)
- Height: 5 ft 8 1/2 in (1.74 m)
- Position: Centre forward

Senior career*
Years	Team	Apps	(Gls)
- Walker Celtic
1930–1931	Huddersfield Town	0	(0)
1931–1933	Washington Colliery		
1933–1937	Stoke City	13	(5)
1937–1938	Burnley	10	(2)
Total		23	(7)
- * Club domestic league appearances and goals

William Paisley Robson (20 December 1907 – 1985) was an English footballer who played in the Football League for Burnley and Stoke City.

== Career ==
Robson was born in Newcastle upon Tyne and played for Walker Celtic, Huddersfield Town and Washington Colliery. He then joined Stoke City after being recommended to Tom Mather by the club's north east scouts. His time at Stoke was mainly spent in the reserves making the odd first team appearance as and when required. In total he spent five years at the Victoria Ground making 14 appearances scoring 6 goals. He then spent the 1937–38 season with Burnley.

== Career statistics ==
Club	Season	League			FA Cup		Total	
Club	Season	Division	Apps	Goals	Apps	Goals	Apps	Goals
Stoke City	1933–34	First Division	2	0	0	0	2	0
Stoke City	1934–35	First Division	3	2	0	0	3	2
Stoke City	1935–36	First Division	0	0	1	1	1	1
Stoke City	1936–37	First Division	6	3	0	0	6	3
Stoke City	1937–38	First Division	2	0	0	0	2	0
Burnley	1937–38	Second Division	10	2	2	1	12	3
Career Total			23	7	3	2	26	9
