= Ernest Hall (footballer) =

English footballer

Personal information
- Full name: Ernest Hall
- Date of birth: 6 August 1916
- Place of birth: Crawcrook, England
- Date of death: 7 July 1944 (aged 27)
- Place of death: St. Pölten, Austria
- Height: 5 ft 10 1/2 in (1.79 m)
- Position: Centre half

Senior career*
Years	Team	Apps	(Gls)
1933–1935	West Wylam Colliery		
1935–1936	Newcastle United	2	(0)
1937–1938	Brighton & Hove Albion	3	(0)
1938–1939	Stoke City	0	(0)
Total		5	(0)
- * Club domestic league appearances and goals

Ernest Hall (6 August 1916 – 7 July 1944) was a footballer who played in the Football League for Brighton & Hove Albion and Newcastle United.

== Personal life ==
Hall served as a pilot officer in the Royal Air Force Volunteer Reserve during the Second World War, being promoted to that rank from sergeant on 28 February 1944. On 7 July 1944, he was killed in action piloting Vickers Wellington LP210 when the bomber was shot down during a bombing raid of Feuersbrunn aerodrome, near St. Pölten, Austria. Hall is buried at the Klagenfurt War Cemetery.

== Career statistics ==
Club	Season	League			FA Cup		Other		Total	
Club	Season	Division	Apps	Goals	Apps	Goals	Apps	Goals	Apps	Goals
Newcastle United	1935–36	Second Division	2	0	0	0	0	0	2	0
Brighton & Hove Albion	1937–38	Third Division South	3	0	0	0	1 (Note: Appearances in Third Division South Cup)	0	4	0
Stoke City	1938–39	First Division	0	0	0	0	0	0	0	0
Career total			5	0	0	0	1	0	6	0
