= Edgar Podmore =

English footballer

Personal information
- Full name: Edgar Podmore
- Date of birth: 20 April 1918
- Place of birth: Stoke-on-Trent, England
- Date of death: 1987 (aged 68–69)
- Position: Goalkeeper

Senior career*
Years	Team	Apps	(Gls)
1943–1948	Stoke City	0	(0)
1947–1948	Crewe Alexandra	1	(0)
- * Club domestic league appearances and goals

Edgar Podmore (20 April 1918 – 1987) was an English footballer who played in the Football League for Crewe Alexandra.

== Career ==
Podmore was born in Stoke-on-Trent and joined Stoke City during World War II. He played once in 1943–44 and six times in 1944–45. He spent two seasons in the club's reserves before joining Crewe Alexandra in 1947. He played one match for Crewe.

== Career statistics ==
Appearances and goals by club, season and competition
Club	Season	League			FA Cup		Total	
Club	Season	Division	Apps	Goals	Apps	Goals	Apps	Goals
Crewe Alexandra	1947–48	Third Division North	1	0	0	0	1	0
Career total			1	0	0	0	1	0
