= 1938–39 Stoke City F.C. season =

Stoke City
1938–39 season
- Chairman: Mr H. Booth
- Manager: Bob McGrory
- Stadium: Victoria Ground
- Football League First Division: 7th (46 Points)
- FA Cup: Third Round
- Top goalscorer: League: Freddie Steele (26); All: Freddie Steele (27)
- Highest home attendance: 33,000 vs Derby County (28 January 1939)
- Lowest home attendance: 15,201 vs Leicester City (24 December 1938)
- Average home league attendance: 22,535
Home colours

The 1938–39 season was Stoke City's 39th season in the Football League and the 25th in the First Division. It was the final full season of league football until 1946 due to World War II.

Stoke again made no major signings despite a very disappointing campaign last season. After a poor start Stoke began to play well during the season and finished in a respectable 7th place having collected 46 points almost equalling their best points tally of 47.

== Season review ==
=== League ===
Despite the scare of relegation last season, there were no significant new faces at the Victoria Ground for the 1938–39 season but Frank Soo took over captaincy from Arthur Turner. The fans did not share the club's confidence and their judgement appeared to be justified as the team spent the first three months of the season in the bottom four. Manager Bob McGrory's patience was wearing thin and he started to trim his squad, selling Charlie Scrimshaw to Middlesbrough for £3,000 and veteran Arthur Turner to Birmingham. To strengthen the attack, he recruited Arthur Griffiths and Patrick Gallacher but both players were struck down by injury after a handful of appearances.

New players or not, an amazing transformation took place and had Stoke beaten Leeds on the final day of the season and not drawn, they would have equalled their best points tally of 47. At home in particular they became a potent force and lost just twice at the Victoria Ground during the season.

=== FA Cup ===
No progress was made in the Cup as Stoke lost in a third round replay to Leicester City.

== Final league table ==
| Pos | Team | Pld | W | D | L | GF | GA | GAv | Pts |
|---|---|---|---|---|---|---|---|---|---|
| 5 | Arsenal | 42 | 19 | 9 | 14 | 55 | 41 | 1.341 | 47 |
| 6 | Derby County | 42 | 19 | 8 | 15 | 66 | 55 | 1.200 | 46 |
| 7 | Stoke City | 42 | 17 | 12 | 13 | 71 | 68 | 1.044 | 46 |
| 8 | Bolton Wanderers | 42 | 15 | 15 | 12 | 67 | 58 | 1.155 | 45 |
| 9 | Preston North End | 42 | 16 | 12 | 14 | 63 | 59 | 1.068 | 44 |

Source: World Football
Rules for classification: 1) Points; 2) Goal average; 3) Goals scored

== Results ==
Stoke's score comes first

=== Legend ===
| Win | Draw | Loss |

=== Football League First Division ===
| Match | Date | Opponent | Venue | Result | Attendance | Scorers |
|---|---|---|---|---|---|---|
| 1 | 27 August 1938 | Leicester City | A | 2–2 | 25,000 | Steele (2) |
| 2 | 29 August 1938 | Charlton Athletic | A | 2–4 | 27,000 | Steele, Baker |
| 3 | 3 September 1938 | Middlesbrough | H | 1–3 | 22,376 | Steele |
| 4 | 5 September 1938 | Leeds United | H | 1–1 | 15,950 | Steele |
| 5 | 10 September 1938 | Birmingham | A | 2–1 | 22,000 | Smith, Baker |
| 6 | 17 September 1938 | Manchester United | H | 1–1 | 21,370 | Soo |
| 7 | 24 September 1938 | Derby County | A | 0–5 | 20,000 | |
| 8 | 1 October 1938 | Chelsea | A | 1–1 | 28,000 | Westland |
| 9 | 8 October 1938 | Preston North End | H | 3–1 | 20,070 | Matthews, Sale, Soo |
| 10 | 15 October 1938 | Brentford | H | 3–2 | 23,436 | Smith, Sale, Baker |
| 11 | 22 October 1938 | Blackpool | A | 1–1 | 25,000 | Baker |
| 12 | 29 October 1938 | Grimsby Town | H | 1–2 | 19,833 | Matthews |
| 13 | 5 November 1938 | Sunderland | A | 0–3 | 25,000 | |
| 14 | 12 November 1938 | Aston Villa | H | 3–1 | 29,464 | Antonio, Sale, Baker |
| 15 | 19 November 1938 | Wolverhampton Wanderers | A | 0–3 | 30,104 | |
| 16 | 26 November 1938 | Everton | H | 0–0 | 26,566 | |
| 17 | 3 December 1938 | Huddersfield Town | A | 4–1 | 12,000 | Sale (3), Steele |
| 18 | 10 December 1938 | Portsmouth | H | 1–1 | 21,882 | Steele |
| 19 | 17 December 1938 | Arsenal | A | 1–4 | 45,000 | Steele |
| 20 | 24 December 1938 | Leicester City | H | 1–0 | 15,201 | Steele |
| 21 | 26 December 1938 | Liverpool | H | 3–1 | 18,027 | Sale (2), Baker |
| 22 | 27 December 1938 | Liverpool | A | 0–1 | 48,000 | |
| 23 | 31 December 1938 | Middlesbrough | A | 1–5 | 12,000 | Peppitt |
| 24 | 2 January 1939 | Bolton Wanderers | A | 3–1 | 15,000 | Peppitt, Baker, Antonio |
| 25 | 14 January 1939 | Birmingham | H | 6–3 | 20,000 | Steele (4), Smith, Sale |
| 26 | 21 January 1939 | Manchester United | A | 1–0 | 25,000 | Steele |
| 27 | 28 January 1939 | Derby County | H | 3–0 | 33,000 | Steele, Smith, Sale |
| 28 | 4 February 1939 | Chelsea | H | 6–1 | 25,047 | Steele (3), Smith, Sale, Baker |
| 29 | 15 February 1939 | Preston North End | A | 1–1 | 15,000 | Smith |
| 30 | 18 February 1939 | Brentford | A | 0–1 | 22,000 | |
| 31 | 25 February 1939 | Blackpool | H | 1–1 | 22,720 | Steele |
| 32 | 7 March 1939 | Grimsby Town | A | 1–3 | 5,000 | Baker |
| 33 | 11 March 1939 | Sunderland | H | 3–1 | 24,000 | Steele (2), Sale |
| 34 | 18 March 1939 | Aston Villa | A | 0–3 | 35,000 | |
| 35 | 29 March 1939 | Wolverhampton Wanderers | H | 5–3 | 35,000 | Sale (3), Steele, Antonio |
| 36 | 1 April 1939 | Everton | A | 1–1 | 30,000 | Sale |
| 37 | 8 April 1939 | Huddersfield Town | H | 2–2 | 26,014 | Sale, Steele |
| 38 | 10 April 1939 | Bolton Wanderers | H | 4–1 | 28,879 | Sale, Steele (2), Baker |
| 39 | 15 April 1939 | Portsmouth | A | 0–2 | 13,000 | |
| 40 | 22 April 1939 | Arsenal | H | 1–0 | 13,000 | Antonio |
| 41 | 29 April 1939 | Charlton Athletic | H | 1–0 | 24,000 | Steele |
| 42 | 6 May 1939 | Leeds United | A | 0–0 | 18,000 | |

=== FA Cup ===
| Round | Date | Opponent | Venue | Result | Attendance | Scorers |
|---|---|---|---|---|---|---|
| R3 | 7 January 1939 | Leicester City | A | 1–1 | 19,750 | Soo |
| R3 Replay | 11 January 1939 | Leicester City | H | 1–2 | 18,488 | Steele |

== Squad statistics ==
| Pos. | Name | League | | FA Cup | | Total | |
| Pos. | Name | Apps | Goals | Apps | Goals | Apps | Goals |
|---|---|---|---|---|---|---|---|
| GK | (Wales) David Jones | 1 | 0 | 0 | 0 | 1 | 0 |
| GK | (Scotland) Douglas Westland | 3 | 0 | 0 | 0 | 3 | 0 |
| GK | (England) Norman Wilkinson | 38 | 0 | 2 | 0 | 40 | 0 |
| DF | (England) John Bamber | 13 | 0 | 0 | 0 | 13 | 0 |
| DF | (England) Harry Brigham | 39 | 0 | 2 | 0 | 41 | 0 |
| DF | (England) Jack Challinor | 12 | 0 | 0 | 0 | 12 | 0 |
| DF | (England) Ernest Hall | 0 | 0 | 0 | 0 | 0 | 0 |
| DF | (England) George Oldham | 2 | 0 | 0 | 0 | 2 | 0 |
| DF | (England) Charlie Scrimshaw | 4 | 0 | 0 | 0 | 4 | 0 |
| DF | (England) Jack Tennant | 26 | 0 | 2 | 0 | 28 | 0 |
| DF | (England) Bill Winstanley | 1 | 0 | 0 | 0 | 1 | 0 |
| MF | (Wales) Arthur Griffiths | 4 | 0 | 0 | 0 | 4 | 0 |
| MF | (Scotland) Jock Kirton | 36 | 0 | 2 | 0 | 38 | 0 |
| MF | (England) Alfred Massey | 2 | 0 | 0 | 0 | 2 | 0 |
| MF | (England) Billy Mould | 22 | 0 | 2 | 0 | 24 | 0 |
| MF | (England) Clement Smith | 20 | 6 | 0 | 0 | 20 | 6 |
| MF | (England) Frank Soo | 42 | 2 | 2 | 1 | 44 | 3 |
| MF | (England) Arthur Turner | 11 | 0 | 0 | 0 | 11 | 0 |
| MF | (England) Arthur Tutin | 3 | 0 | 0 | 0 | 3 | 0 |
| FW | (England) George Antonio | 23 | 4 | 2 | 0 | 25 | 4 |
| FW | (England) Frank Baker | 36 | 10 | 2 | 0 | 38 | 10 |
| FW | (Wales) Syd Fursland | 1 | 0 | 0 | 0 | 1 | 0 |
| FW | (Scotland) Patrick Gallacher | 3 | 0 | 1 | 0 | 4 | 0 |
| FW | (England) Eric Jones | 0 | 0 | 0 | 0 | 0 | 0 |
| FW | (England) Bobby Liddle | 2 | 0 | 0 | 0 | 2 | 0 |
| FW | (England) Stanley Matthews | 36 | 2 | 2 | 0 | 38 | 2 |
| FW | (England) Alexander Ormston | 9 | 0 | 1 | 0 | 10 | 0 |
| FW | (England) Syd Peppitt | 6 | 2 | 0 | 0 | 6 | 2 |
| FW | (England) Tommy Sale | 34 | 18 | 0 | 0 | 34 | 18 |
| FW | (England) Freddie Steele | 31 | 26 | 2 | 1 | 33 | 27 |
| FW | (Scotland) James Westland | 2 | 1 | 0 | 0 | 2 | 1 |
