= Billy Frame =

Scottish footballer (1912–1992)

Personal information
- Full name: William Lammie Frame
- Date of birth: 7 May 1912
- Place of birth: Carluke, Scotland
- Date of death: 1992 (aged 79–80)
- Height: 5 ft 8 1/2 in (1.74 m)
- Position: Full back

Senior career*
Years	Team	Apps	(Gls)
19??–1933	Shawfield	?	
1933–1950	Leicester City	220	(0)
1950–?	Rugby Town		
- * Club domestic league appearances and goals

William Lammie Frame (7 May 1912 – 1992) was a Scottish footballer who played as a full back between the 1930s and 1950s.

He was born in Carluke and played for the Glasgow-based Shawfield club before moving to Leicester City in October 1933, going on to make 459 senior appearances for them (including wartime games). He made his debut for the Foxes against Tottenham Hotspur, during which he scored an own goal. He left the club in 1950 and went to play for Rugby Town.
