= Emlyn Williams (footballer, born 1912) =

Welsh footballer

Personal information
- Full name: Emlyn Williams
- Date of birth: 15 January 1912
- Place of birth: Maesteg, Wales
- Date of death: 1989 (aged 76–77)
- Position: Defender

Senior career*
Years	Team	Apps	(Gls)
1934–1935	Wrexham	0	(0)
1935–1936	Burton Town		
1936–1938	Barnsley	88	(0)
1939–1947	Preston North End	62	(0)
1947–1948	Barnsley	17	(0)
1948	Accrington Stanley	15	(0)
Total		182	(0)
- * Club domestic league appearances and goals

Emlyn Williams (15 January 1912 – 23 November 1989) was a footballer who played in the English Football League for Accrington Stanley, Barnsley, Preston North End, and guested for Stoke City during World War II.

== Career statistics ==
Appearances and goals by club, season and competition
Club	Season	League			FA Cup		Total	
Club	Season	Division	Apps	Goals	Apps	Goals	Apps	Goals
Wrexham	1934–35	Third Division North	0	0	0	0	0	0
Barnsley	1936–37	Second Division	14	0	0	0	14	0
Barnsley	1937–38	Second Division	33	0	4	0	37	0
Barnsley	1938–39	Third Division North	41	0	1	0	42	0
Barnsley	Total		88	0	5	0	88	0
Preston North End	1945–46	War League	0	0	6	0	6	0
Preston North End	1946–47	First Division	33	0	4	0	37	0
Preston North End	1947–48	First Division	29	0	3	0	32	0
Preston North End	Total		62	0	13	0	75	0
Barnsley	1947–48	Second Division	2	0	0	0	2	0
Barnsley	1948–49	Second Division	15	0	0	0	15	0
Barnsley	Total		17	0	0	0	17	0
Accrington Stanley	1948–49	Third Division North	15	0	0	0	15	0
Career total			182	0	18	0	200	0
