= George Oldham (footballer) =

English footballer

Personal information
- Full name: George Oldham
- Date of birth: 20 April 1920
- Place of birth: Tintwistle, Derbyshire, England
- Date of death: 1993 (aged 73)
- Place of death: Luton, England
- Position: Left back

Senior career*
Years	Team	Apps	(Gls)
- Mottram Central
1938–1939	Stoke City	2	(0)
1946–1948	Newport County	63	(0)
- Hitchin Town
Total		65	(0)
- * Club domestic league appearances and goals

George Oldham (20 April 1920 – 1993) was an English footballer who played in the Football League for Newport County and Stoke City.

== Career ==
Oldham was born in Tintwistle, Derbyshire and played amateur football with Mottram Central before joining Stoke City in 1938. He played twice for Stoke in 1938–39 before his career was interrupted by World War II. After the war was over Oldham joined Newport County where he spent two seasons and later went on to play for Hitchin Town.

== Career statistics ==
Club	Season	League			FA Cup		Total	
Club	Season	Division	Apps	Goals	Apps	Goals	Apps	Goals
Stoke City	1938–39	First Division	2	0	0	0	2	0
Newport County	1946–47	Second Division	39	0	0	0	39	0
Newport County	1947–48	Third Division South	24	0	0	0	24	0
Career total			65	0	0	0	65	0
