= Bobby Windsor (footballer) =

English footballer

Personal information
- Full name: Robert Windsor
- Date of birth: 31 January 1926
- Place of birth: Stoke-on-Trent, England
- Date of death: 2000 (aged 74)
- Position: Forward

Senior career*
Years	Team	Apps	(Gls)
1943–1948	Stoke City	0	(0)
1948–1950	Lincoln City	11	(1)
- Wellington Town
- * Club domestic league appearances and goals

Robert "Bobby" Windsor (31 January 1926 – 2000) was an English footballer who played in the Football League for Lincoln City.

== Career ==
Windsor was born in Stoke-on-Trent and joined Stoke City during World War II. He made two appearances for Stoke in 1943–44 and in 1944–45. He made three appearances in 1945–46 and with the war coming to an end Windsor had the opportunity to being to push for a first team place. But he was nowhere near good enough and played for the reserves for two seasons before joining Lincoln City. He played two seasons for Lincoln playing 11 times scoring once against Sheffield Wednesday. He ended his career with non-league Wellington Town.

== Career statistics ==
Club	Season	League		FA Cup		Total	
Club	Season	Apps	Goals	Apps	Goals	Apps	Goals
Lincoln City	1948–49	9	1	0	0	9	1
Lincoln City	1949–50	2	0	0	0	2	0
Career Total		11	1	0	0	11	1
