= Owen Johnson (footballer) =

English footballer

Personal information
- Full name: Owen Edmund Johnson
- Date of birth: 13 November 1919
- Place of birth: Grimsby, England
- Date of death: 6 August 2001 (aged 81)
- Position: Outside left

Senior career*
| Years | Team | Apps | (Gls) |
| 1936–1937 | Stoke City | 0 | (0) |
| 1937–1946 | Derby County | 0 | (0) |
| 1946–1947 | Bradford City | 10 | (1) |
- Shrewsbury Town
- * Club domestic league appearances and goals

Owen Edmund Johnson (13 November 1919 – 6 August 2001) was an English professional footballer who played as an outside left.

== Career ==
Born in Grimsby, Johnson spent his early career with Stoke City and Derby County. He signed for Bradford City in October 1946, leaving the club in July 1947 to sign for Shrewsbury Town. During his time with Bradford City he made 10 appearances in the Football League, scoring once.

== Career statistics ==
| Club | Season | League | | | FA Cup | | Total | |
| Club | Season | Division | Apps | Goals | Apps | Goals | Apps | Goals |
|---|---|---|---|---|---|---|---|---|
| Stoke City | 1936–37 | First Division | 0 | 0 | 0 | 0 | 0 | 0 |
| Derby County | 1937–38 | First Division | 0 | 0 | 0 | 0 | 0 | 0 |
| Bradford City | 1946–47 | Third Division North | 10 | 1 | 0 | 0 | 10 | 1 |
| Career total | | | 10 | 1 | 0 | 0 | 10 | 1 |

== Sources ==
- Frost, Terry (1988). Bradford City A Complete Record 1903-1988. Breedon Books Sport. ISBN 0-907969-38-0.
