= Jack Challinor =

English footballer and manager

Personal information
- Full name: John Challinor
- Date of birth: 5 August 1916
- Place of birth: Middlewich, England
- Date of death: 1981 (aged 65)
- Position: Left back

Senior career*
Years	Team	Apps	(Gls)
1936	Witton Albion		
1937–1939	Stoke City	43	(0)
1939	Linfield		

Managerial career
- –: Linfield
- * Club domestic league appearances and goals

John Challinor (5 August 1916 – 1981) was an English footballer who played in the Football League for Stoke City.

== Career ==
Challinor was born in Middlewich and played for Witton Albion before joining Stoke City in 1937. He became a regular in the 1937–38 season due to injury to Charlie Scrimshaw, playing in 34 matches. He managed to make a modest 12 in the following campaign and left for Irish club Linfield. He did well with the Belfast club, and later managed the club for a few years.

== Career statistics ==
Appearances and goals by club, season and competition
Club	Season	League			FA Cup		Total	
Club	Season	Division	Apps	Goals	Apps	Goals	Apps	Goals
Stoke City	1937–38	First Division	31	0	3	0	34	0
Stoke City	1938–39	First Division	12	0	0	0	12	0
Career total			43	0	3	0	46	0
