= Pat McMahon (footballer, born 1908) =

Scottish footballer

Personal information
- Full name: Patrick McMahon
- Date of birth: 26 October 1908
- Place of birth: Glasgow, Scotland
- Date of death: 1992 (aged 83–84)
- Height: 5 ft 8 in (1.73 m)
- Position: Goalkeeper

Senior career*
Years	Team	Apps	(Gls)
1930–1931	Pollokshaws Hibs		
1931–1932	St Anthony's		
1932–1933	West Ham United	16	(0)
1934	St Mirren		
1934–1939	Wrexham	113	(0)
1939	Stoke City	0	(0)
Total		129	(0)
- * Club domestic league appearances and goals

Patrick McMahon (16 October 1908 – 1992) was a Scottish footballer who played in the Football League for Stoke City, West Ham United and Wrexham.

== Career ==
McMahon was born in Glasgow and played for Pollokshaws Hibs and St Anthony's before joining English side West Ham United in 1932. He spent two seasons with the Hammers making 16 appearances before returning to Scotland with St Mirren. He soon moved back down south to Third Division North side Wrexham. He spent five seasons at Racecourse Ground making 113 appearances. In the summer of 1939 he joined Stoke City playing in the first three matches of 1939–40 season. The league was abandoned due to World War II and McMahon moved back to Wrexham to join the home guard and also guested for the football club.

== Career statistics ==
Club	Season	League			FA Cup		Other		Total	
Club	Season	Division	Apps	Goals	Apps	Goals	Apps	Goals	Apps	Goals
West Ham United	1932–33	Second Division	13	0	1	0	—		14	0
West Ham United	1933–34	Second Division	3	0	0	0	—		3	0
West Ham United	Total		16	0	1	0	—		17	0
Wrexham	1934–35	Third Division North	2	0	0	0	0	0	2	0
Wrexham	1935–36	Third Division North	30	0	1	0	1	0	32	0
Wrexham	1936–37	Third Division North	36	0	3	0	1	0	40	0
Wrexham	1937–38	Third Division North	42	0	2	0	1	0	45	0
Wrexham	1938–39	Third Division North	3	0	1	0	0	0	4	0
Wrexham	Total		113	0	7	0	3	0	123	0
Career total			129	0	8	0	3	0	140	0
