= Roy Crossley =

English footballer

Personal information
- Full name: Roy Crossley
- Date of birth: 16 October 1923
- Place of birth: Hebden Bridge, England
- Date of death: 2003 (aged 80)
- Position: Forward

Senior career*
Years	Team	Apps	(Gls)
1941–1948	Huddersfield Town	0	(0)
1943–1944	→ Stoke City (guest)		
1948–1951	Halifax Town	41	(15)
- * Club domestic league appearances and goals

Roy Crossley (16 October 1923 – 2003) was an English footballer who played in the Football League for Halifax Town.

== Career ==
Crossley was born in Hebden Bridge and joined Huddersfield Town during World War II. He made three appearances guesting for Stoke City in 1943–44. He played for Huddersfield until 1948 when he joined Halifax Town. He played 47 times for the "Shaymen" scoring 15 goals.

== Career statistics ==
Club	Season	League		FA Cup		Total	
Club	Season	Apps	Goals	Apps	Goals	Apps	Goals
Halifax Town	1948–49	25	11	2	0	27	11
Halifax Town	1949–50	13	4	0	0	13	4
Halifax Town	1950–51	3	0	0	0	3	0
Career Total		45	15	2	0	47	15
