= Jack Tennant =

English footballer

Personal information
- Full name: John William Tennant
- Date of birth: 3 August 1907
- Place of birth: Newcastle upon Tyne, England
- Date of death: 1978 (aged 71)
- Position: Defender

Senior career*
Years	Team	Apps	(Gls)
1925	Washington Colliery		
1926	Newcastle United	0	(0)
1927–1930	Washington Colliery		
1930–1931	Stoke City	1	(0)
1932–1933	Torquay United	42	(0)
1933–1934	Liverpool	39	(0)
1935–1938	Bolton Wanderers	99	(1)
1938–1939	Stoke City	26	(0)
Total		207	(1)
- * Club domestic league appearances and goals

John William Tennant (3 August 1907 – 1978) was a footballer who played in the Football League for Bolton Wanderers, Liverpool, Torquay United and Stoke City.

== Career ==
Tennant was born in Newcastle upon Tyne and played for his works team Washington Colliery before joining in 1926 Newcastle United but returned to the Colliery without making an appearance. Four years later he signed for Stoke City but played just once in 1930–31 which came in a 2–1 victory over Charlton Athletic on 25 October 1930. Tennant then spent the 1932–33 at Torquay United playing in all of the "Gulls" matches and impressed enough to earn a move to Liverpool.

He earned a reputation as a speedy left back at Anfield and it came as a surprise when he was sold to Bolton Wanderers in 1935 having just established himself in the side. He spent four years with Bolton making just over 100 appearances in the First Division and made a return to Stoke in 1938–39. He played 28 matches before World War II ended his career. During the war he guested for Liverpool, Southport and Wrexham.

== Career statistics ==
Appearances and goals by club, season and competition
Club	Season	League			FA Cup		Total	
Club	Season	Division	Apps	Goals	Apps	Goals	Apps	Goals
Stoke City	1930–31	Second Division	1	0	0	0	1	0
Torquay United	1932–33	Third Division South	42	0	5	1	47	1
Liverpool	1933–34	First Division	13	0	1	0	14	0
Liverpool	1934–35	First Division	26	0	2	0	28	0
Liverpool	Total		65	0	3	0	68	0
Bolton Wanderers	1935–36	First Division	20	0	0	0	20	0
Bolton Wanderers	1936–37	First Division	37	0	5	0	42	0
Bolton Wanderers	1937–38	First Division	38	1	1	0	39	1
Bolton Wanderers	1938–39	First Division	4	0	0	0	4	0
Bolton Wanderers	Total		99	1	6	0	105	1
Stoke City	1938–39	First Division	26	0	2	0	28	0
Career total			207	1	16	1	223	2
