= David Jones (football goalkeeper, born 1914) =

Welsh footballer

Personal information
- Full name: David Jones
- Date of birth: 8 September 1914
- Place of birth: Blaenau Ffestiniog, Wales
- Date of death: 30 October 1999 (aged 85)
- Place of death: Newcastle-under-Lyme, England
- Position: Goalkeeper

Senior career*
Years	Team	Apps	(Gls)
1933–1935	Blaenau Ffestiniog		
1935–1936	Everton	0	(0)
1936–1938	Colwyn Bay		
1938–1939	Stoke City	1	(0)
1939–1947	Carlisle United	66	(0)
1948–1949	Rochdale	0	(0)
1949	Northwich Victoria		
- * Club domestic league appearances and goals

David Jones (8 September 1914 – 30 October 1999), sometimes incorrectly identified as Douglas Jones, was a Welsh footballer who played in the English Football League for Carlisle United and Stoke City.

== Career ==
Jones began his career with his home town club Blaenau Ffestiniog before joining Everton. He failed to make the breakthrough at Goodison Park and left for Colwyn Bay before joining Stoke City in 1938. He played one match for Stoke which came on the final day of the 1938–39 season in a 0–0 at Leeds United he then signed for Carlisle United but his career was halted due to World War II. He returned to play for Stoke during the war and played two seasons for the "Cumbrians" once the war was over. After a short spell with Rochdale he played for non-league Northwich Victoria.

== Career statistics ==
Club	Season	League			FA Cup		Total	
Club	Season	Division	Apps	Goals	Apps	Goals	Apps	Goals
Stoke City	1938–39	First Division	1	0	0	0	1	0
Carlisle United	1946–47	Third Division North	41	0	3	0	44	0
Carlisle United	1947–48	Third Division North	25	0	1	0	26	0
Career Total			67	0	4	0	71	0
