= James Harbot =

English footballer (1907–1992)

Personal information
- Full name: James Willie Harbot
- Date of birth: 16 August 1907
- Place of birth: Bolton, England
- Date of death: 1992 (aged 85)
- Height: 5 ft 9 in (1.75 m)
- Position: Right back

Senior career*
Years	Team	Apps	(Gls)
- Royal Marines
1930–1931	Gillingham	2	(1)
1932–1933	Charlton Athletic	1	(1)
1933–1934	Barrow	23	(0)
1936–1937	Stoke City	1	(0)
1937–1938	Torquay United	15	(0)
–	Chorley		
Total		42	(2)
- * Club domestic league appearances and goals

James Willie Harbot (16 August 1907 – 1992) was an English footballer who played in the Football League for Barrow, Charlton Athletic, Gillingham, Stoke City and Torquay United.

== Career ==
Harbot was born in Bolton and joined the Royal Marines in the late 1920s. He played football with the Marines and joined Gillingham in 1930. Due to his army commitments he never was able to sustain a prolonged spell with one club spent a short time at Charlton Athletic, Barrow, Stoke City and Torquay United. In his only league match for Stoke City they beat West Bromwich Albion 10–3, their record league victory.

== Career statistics ==
Appearances and goals by club, season and competition
Club	Season	League			FA Cup		Total	
Club	Season	Division	Apps	Goals	Apps	Goals	Apps	Goals
Gillingham	1930–31	Third Division South	2	1	0	0	2	1
Charlton Athletic	1932–33	Second Division	1	1	0	0	1	1
Barrow	1933–34	Third Division North	23	0	0	0	23	0
Stoke City	1936–37	First Division	1	0	1	0	2	0
Torquay United	1937–38	Third Division South	15	0	1	0	16	0
Career Total			42	2	2	0	44	2
