= Arthur Tutin =

English footballer

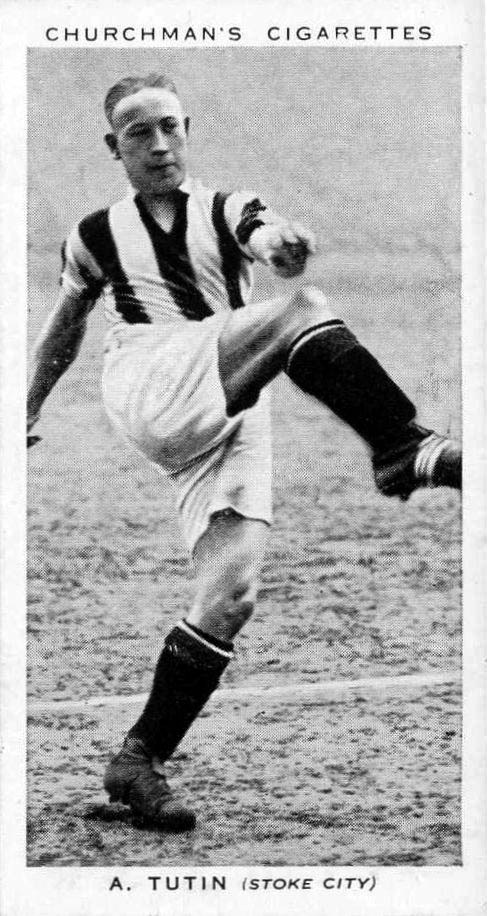
- Tutin on a cigarette card in 1938

Personal information
- Full name: Arthur Tutin
- Date of birth: 3 April 1907
- Place of birth: Coundon, England
- Date of death: 1961 (aged 53–54)
- Height: 5 ft 6 in (1.68 m)
- Position: Right half

Senior career*
Years	Team	Apps	(Gls)
1924–1925	Shildon		
1925–1926	Newton Aycliffe		
1926–1927	Ferryhill Athletic		
1927–1928	Bishop Auckland		
1928–1929	Consett		
1929–1930	Chilton Colliery Recreation Athletic		
1930–1931	Spennymoor United		
1931–1932	Crook Town		
1932–1933	Aldershot	12	(0)
1933–1939	Stoke City	183	(3)
1941-1942	Wrexham	4	(0)
Total		199	(3)
- * Club domestic league appearances and goals

Arthur Tutin (3 April 1907 – 1961) was an English footballer who played in the Football League for Aldershot and Stoke City.

== Career ==
Tutin was born in Coundon and played for a good number of local non-league teams and after failed trials at Sheffield Wednesday and Bradford Park Avenue he joined Aldershot in 1932. After playing 12 matches for the "Shots" Tutin joined First Division Stoke City for £500. Standing at just 5 ft 4in he looked well out of place in Stoke's squad and he made a nightmare start. Tasked with marking Middlesbrough's Charlie Ferguson on his debut, Tutin left him unmarked twice as Stoke crashed to a 6–1 defeat. However, he soon got to grips with top flight football and his lack of height was his main asset as his job in the side was to win the ball back and play in the wingers Frank Soo and Stanley Matthews and it was a task he excelled at. He became an ever-present in the Stoke side in the mid 30s playing every match during the 1935–36 season as Stoke finished in 4th position their highest up to that point. He remained in Bob McGrory's team for two more seasons before losing his place to Jock Kirton. In the 1941-42 season, Tutin was a guest player for Wrexham AFC. He made 4 first team competitive appearances before his retirement from football.

== Career statistics ==
Appearances and goals by club, season and competition
Club	Season	League			FA Cup		Total	
Club	Season	Division	Apps	Goals	Apps	Goals	Apps	Goals
Aldershot	1932–33	Third Division South	12	0	0	0	12	0
Stoke City	1933–34	First Division	24	0	4	0	28	0
Stoke City	1934–35	First Division	41	1	1	0	42	1
Stoke City	1935–36	First Division	42	0	5	0	47	0
Stoke City	1936–37	First Division	39	1	2	0	41	1
Stoke City	1937–38	First Division	34	1	3	0	37	1
Stoke City	1938–39	First Division	3	0	0	0	3	0
Stoke City	Total		183	3	15	0	198	3
Career total			195	3	15	0	210	3
