= Thomas Vallance =

English footballer

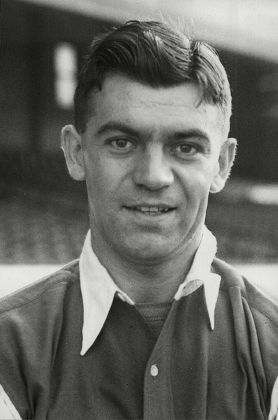

Personal information
- Full name: Thomas Henshall Wilson Vallance
- Date of birth: 28 March 1924
- Place of birth: Stoke-on-Trent, England
- Date of death: July 1980 (aged 56)
- Position: Winger

Senior career*
Years	Team	Apps	(Gls)
1943–1946	Stoke City		
1946–1947	Torquay United	0	(0)
1948–1950	Arsenal	15	(2)
- * Club domestic league appearances and goals

Thomas Henshall Wilson Vallance (28 March 1924 - July 1980) was an English professional footballer who played as an outside-left.

== Career ==
Vallance was born in Stoke-on-Trent, and was the son of Jimmy Vallance, the trainer at Stoke City. Vallance began his career at Stoke City during the Second World War. He moved to Torquay United in 1945, playing in the FA Cup First Round, second leg tie which Torquay drew away to Newport County to lose 2–1 on aggregate in November 1945 . He left Torquay before playing a league game and subsequently joined Arsenal in 1947. Mainly a reserve, he finally made his league debut on 4 September 1948 in a 1–1 draw against Sheffield United after Arsenal's regular left-winger, Denis Compton had been injured. He shared the left wing position with Ian McPherson that season, playing 14 times and scoring twice, but played just once the following season as McPherson and Compton monopolised the left wing position. After several more seasons in Arsenal's reserves, he left the club on a free transfer in 1953.

Vallance was the brother-in-law of England international Stanley Matthews — Vallance's sister, Betty, had married Matthews in 1934.

== Career statistics ==
Club	Season	League			FA Cup		Total	
Club	Season	Division	Apps	Goals	Apps	Goals	Apps	Goals
Torquay United	1945–46	War League	0	0	1	0	1	0
Arsenal	1948–49	First Division	14	2	0	0	14	2
Arsenal	1949–50	First Division	1	0	0	0	1	0
Career total			15	2	1	0	16	2
