= 1936–37 Stoke City F.C. season =

Stoke City
1936–37 season
- Chairman: Mr H. Booth
- Manager: Bob McGrory
- Stadium: Victoria Ground
- Football League First Division: 10th (42 Points)
- FA Cup: Fourth Round
- Top goalscorer: League: Freddie Steele (33); All: Freddie Steele (36)
- Highest home attendance: 51,373 vs Arsenal (29 March 1937)
- Lowest home attendance: 8,224 vs West Bromwich Albion (4 February 1937)
- Average home league attendance: 22,261
Home colours

The 1936–37 season was Stoke City's 37th season in the Football League and the 23rd in the First Division.

After the club's best ever season last campaign Stoke struggled to live up to their previous success and finished the season in a mid-table position of 10th. However it was a to be a season of record making with three being set during the 1936–37 season. A record attendance of 51,373 made it into the Victoria Ground on 29 March to watch a 0–0 draw with Arsenal. However the most remarkable achievement was that of a 10–3 victory over Staffordshire rivals West Bromwich Albion and thirdly, Freddie Steele finished the season with 33 league goals.

== Season review ==
=== League ===
During the summer of 1936 there was a change at boardroom level with Mr H. Booth replacing Mr A. Sherwin as chairman. After the club's best ever season in 1935–36 Stoke found it difficult in the 1936–37 season to improve and a disappointing 10th-place finish was the final outcome. Stoke were hampered by a poor away record with only three wins forthcoming during the season and an equal record of 15 wins and defeats a mid-table finish was the obvious outcome.

During the 1936–37 season Stoke made three new club records which all still stand. A record attendance of 51,373 made it into the Victoria Ground on 29 March to watch a 0–0 draw with Arsenal. However the most remarkable achievement was that of a 10–3 victory over Staffordshire rivals West Bromwich Albion and thirdly, Freddie Steele finished the season with 33 league goals.

=== Record league victory ===
A 10–3 win over West Bromwich Albion is Stoke City's record League victory here is a summary of the match.

Stoke gave debuts to Scottish keeper Douglas Westland and full-back James Harbot. Stoke went into the match as narrow favourites but went on to outclass Albion in all positions. The first goal came after 10 minutes as Steele headed in a Stanley Matthews cross. Albion levelled just a minute later through Richardson following a fine move. Stoke re-took the lead through a copy of their first on 20 minutes as Albion struggled to contain Matthews. After 32 minutes Stoke went 3–1 up, Steele was brought down in the area by Bill Richardson and Arthur Turner scored from the spot. Four minutes before half-time Steele claimed his hat-trick. In the second half Stoke made it 5–1 through England winger Joe Johnson before Steele missed an open goal. Wally Boyes pulled one back to 5–2 however Steele got his fourth and fifth to make it 7–2 on 67 minutes. Richardson made it 7–3 before Johnson again and George Antonio got on the score sheet. With 15 minutes left the score line was 9–3 and with the crowd chanting for more it duly arrived when Antonio made it 10–3 to complete a historic result.

4 February 1937

Stoke City	10–3	West Bromwich Albion
Steele; Turner pen.' Johnson; Antonio		Boyes; Richardson; Robbins

Victoria Ground

=== FA Cup ===
Stoke beat Birmingham 4–1 in the third round with Freddie Steele bagging a hat trick. However Stoke were on the end of a heavy defeat themselves in the next round as they lost 5–1 to eventual runners-up Preston North End.

== Final league table ==
Pos	Team	Pld	W	D	L	GF	GA	GAv	Pts
8	Sunderland	42	19	6	17	89	87	1.023	44
9	Portsmouth	42	17	10	15	62	66	0.939	44
10	Stoke City	42	15	12	15	72	57	1.263	42
11	Birmingham	42	13	15	14	64	60	1.067	41
12	Grimsby Town	42	17	7	18	86	81	1.062	41

Source: World Football
Rules for classification: 1) Points; 2) Goal average; 3) Goals scored

== Results ==
Stoke's score comes first

=== Legend ===
Win	Draw	Loss

=== Football League First Division ===
Match	Date	Opponent	Venue	Result	Attendance	Scorers
1	29 August 1936	Liverpool	A	1–2	23,000	Johnson
2	31 August 1936	Charlton Athletic	H	1–1	23,524	Steele
3	5 September 1936	Leeds United	H	2–1	19,080	Liddle, Milburn (o.g.)
4	7 September 1936	Charlton Athletic	A	0–2	20,000	
5	12 September 1936	Birmingham	A	4–2	10,000	Steele (3), Matthews
6	14 September 1936	Grimsby Town	H	2–0	18,229	Steele (2)
7	19 September 1936	Middlesbrough	H	6–2	29,106	Steele (3), Matthews, Johnson (2)
8	26 September 1936	West Bromwich Albion	A	2–2	27,086	Steele, Johnson
9	3 October 1936	Manchester City	H	2–2	36,292	Steele, Matthews
10	10 October 1936	Portsmouth	A	0–1	18,000	
11	17 October 1936	Preston North End	H	0–2	19,518	
12	24 October 1936	Sheffield Wednesday	A	0–0	18,000	
13	31 October 1936	Manchester United	H	3–0	22,464	Davies, Matthews, Johnson
14	7 November 1936	Derby County	A	2–2	20,000	Johnson, Steele
15	14 November 1936	Wolverhampton Wanderers	H	2–1	21,349	Johnson, Steele
16	21 November 1936	Sunderland	A	0–3	25,000	
17	28 November 1936	Huddersfield Town	H	1–1	13,644	Fursland
18	5 December 1936	Everton	A	1–1	15,000	Robson
19	12 December 1936	Bolton Wanderers	H	2–2	8,359	Matthews (2)
20	19 December 1936	Brentford	A	1–2	25,000	Robson
21	25 December 1936	Chelsea	H	2–0	24,789	Johnson (2)
22	26 December 1936	Liverpool	H	1–1	38,940	Robson
23	28 December 1936	Chelsea	A	0–1	18,000	
24	2 January 1937	Leeds United	A	1–2	20,000	Johnson
25	9 January 1937	Birmingham	H	2–0	15,211	Turner (pen), Westland
26	23 January 1937	Middlesbrough	A	0–1	14,000	
27	4 February 1937	West Bromwich Albion	H	10–3	8,224	Steele (5), Turner (pen), Johnson (2), Antonio (2)
28	6 February 1937	Manchester City	A	1–2	30,000	Turner (pen)
29	13 February 1937	Portsmouth	H	2–4	18,237	Steele (2)
30	24 February 1937	Preston North End	A	1–0	8,000	Steele
31	6 March 1937	Manchester United	A	1–2	15,000	Steele
32	13 March 1937	Derby County	H	1–2	20,106	Steele
33	20 March 1937	Wolverhampton Wanderers	A	1–2	20,000	Steele
34	26 March 1937	Arsenal	A	0–0	40,000	
35	27 March 1937	Sunderland	H	5–3	29,292	Westland, Tutin, Steele (3)
36	29 March 1937	Arsenal	H	0–0	51,373	
37	3 April 1937	Huddersfield Town	A	1–2	12,000	Steele
38	5 April 1937	Sheffield Wednesday	H	1–0	11,573	Westland
39	10 April 1937	Everton	H	2–1	17,646	Westland, Mercer (o.g.)
40	17 April 1937	Bolton Wanderers	A	0–0	12,000	
41	24 April 1937	Brentford	H	5–1	18,349	Steele (3), Antonio, Matthews
42	1 May 1937	Grimsby Town	A	3–1	8,000	Steele (2), Johnson

=== FA Cup ===
Round	Date	Opponent	Venue	Result	Attendance	Scorers
R3	16 January 1937	Birmingham	H	4–1	31,480	Steele (3), Johnson
R4	30 January 1937	Preston North End	A	1–5	23,866	Johnson

== Squad statistics ==
Pos.	Name	League		FA Cup		Total	
Pos.	Name	Apps	Goals	Apps	Goals	Apps	Goals
GK	(England) Norman Wilkinson	41	0	2	0	43	0
GK	(Scotland) Douglas Westland	1	0	0	0	1	0
DF	(England) Harry Brigham	21	0	2	0	23	0
DF	(England) James Harbot	1	0	1	0	2	0
DF	(England) Charlie Scrimshaw	41	0	1	0	42	0
DF	(England) Bill Winstanley	21	0	0	0	21	0
MF	(Scotland) Jock Kirton	12	0	2	0	14	0
MF	(England) Bill Moore	2	0	0	0	2	0
MF	(England) Frank Soo	31	0	0	0	31	0
MF	(England) Arthur Turner	42	3	2	0	44	3
MF	(England) Arthur Tutin	39	1	2	0	41	1
FW	(England) George Antonio	20	3	2	0	22	3
FW	(England) Frank Baker	4	0	0	0	4	0
FW	(England) Harry Davies	23	1	0	0	23	1
FW	(Wales) Syd Fursland	2	1	0	0	2	1
FW	(England) Joe Johnson	36	13	2	2	38	15
FW	(England) Owen Johnson	0	0	0	0	0	0
FW	(England) Bobby Liddle	20	1	0	0	20	1
FW	(England) Stanley Matthews	40	7	2	0	42	7
FW	(England) Syd Peppitt	3	0	0	0	3	0
FW	(England) Billy Robson	6	3	0	0	6	3
FW	(England) Freddie Steele	35	33	2	3	37	36
FW	(Scotland) James Westland	21	4	2	0	23	4
–	Own goals	–	2	–	0	–	2
