= Bert Wright (footballer) =

English footballer

Personal information
- Full name: George Albert Wright
- Date of birth: 4 February 1920
- Place of birth: Sheffield, England
- Date of death: August 2000 (aged 80)
- Place of death: Sheffield, England
- Position: Forward

Senior career*
Years	Team	Apps	(Gls)
1942–1946	Cardiff City	0	(0)
1946–1947	Hull City	4	(1)
Total		4	(1)
- * Club domestic league appearances and goals

George Albert Wright (4 February 1920 – August 2000) was an English footballer who played as a forward in the Football League for Cardiff City and Hull City around World War II. He died in Sheffield in August 2000 at the age of 80.

== Career ==
Wright played for Cardiff City and also guested for both Stoke City and Port Vale during the war. Wright was serving in the Royal Air Force when he played wartime football. He made 15 guest appearances for Vale between August and December 1944 and also made a guest appearance in March 1946. After he left Ninian Park in 1946, he moved on to Frank Buckley's Hull City. He scored on his debut against York City. He made three further Third Division North appearances in the 1946–47 season, playing at both inside-left and inside-right, before losing his place in the team in November. After losing his place ar Boothferry Park, Wright decided to leave professional football and returned to his family's business in Sheffield.

== Career statistics ==
Appearances and goals by club, season and competition
Club	Season	League			FA Cup		Total	
Club	Season	Division	Apps	Goals	Apps	Goals	Apps	Goals
Cardiff City	1945–46		0	0	2	0	2	0
Hull City	1946–47	Third Division North	4	1	0	0	4	1
Career total			4	1	2	0	6	1
