= Douglas Westland =

Scottish footballer

Personal information
- Full name: Douglas George Westland
- Date of birth: 3 April 1909
- Place of birth: Aberdeen, Scotland
- Date of death: June 1998 (aged 89)
- Place of death: Barrie, Canada
- Height: 6 ft 0 in (1.83 m)
- Position: Goalkeeper

Senior career*
Years	Team	Apps	(Gls)
–	Banks O' Dee		
1934–1936	Aberdeen	9	(0)
1936–1938	Stoke City	5	(0)
–	Barlaston St Giles		
–	Raith Rovers		
- * Club domestic league appearances and goals

Douglas George Westland (3 April 1909 – June 1998) was a Scottish footballer who played in the English Football League for Stoke City. His brother James Westland was also a footballer who played for Stoke City.

== Career ==
Westland was born in Aberdeen and played for Banks O' Dee and Aberdeen along with his brother James, and they both signed for English club Stoke City in 1936. Douglas struggled to make much of an impact at the Victoria Ground failing to take over from Norman Wilkinson. He spent three seasons at Stoke making just six appearances and later played for Barlaston St Giles and Raith Rovers.

== Career statistics ==
Appearances and goals by club, season and competition
Club	Season	League			FA Cup		Total	
Club	Season	Division	Apps	Goals	Apps	Goals	Apps	Goals
Stoke City	1936–37	First Division	1	0	0	0	1	0
Stoke City	1937–38	First Division	1	0	1	0	2	0
Stoke City	1938–39	First Division	3	0	0	0	3	0
Career total			5	0	1	0	6	0
