= James Westland (footballer) =

Scottish footballer

Personal information
- Full name: James Westland
- Date of birth: 21 July 1916
- Place of birth: Aberdeen, Scotland
- Date of death: February 1972 (aged 55)
- Place of death: Newcastle-under-Lyme, England
- Height: 5 ft 9 1/2 in (1.77 m)
- Position: Inside left

Senior career*
Years	Team	Apps	(Gls)
–	Inchgarth		
–	Banks O' Dee		
1934–1935	Aberdeen	3	(2)
1935–1938	Stoke City	60	(16)
1946	Mansfield Town	10	(0)
Total		73	(18)
- * Club domestic league appearances and goals

James Westland (21 July 1916 – February 1972) was a Scottish footballer who played in the Football League for Mansfield Town and Stoke City.

== Career ==
Born in Aberdeen Westland started playing football for Scottish Junior clubs Inchgarth and Banks O' Dee before joining Aberdeen in 1934 along with his brother Douglas. He played three times for the "Dons" scoring twice and impressed watching scouts from English Football League side Stoke City who signed Westland and his brother. His time at the "Potters" saw him playing alongside greats such as Stanley Matthews, Tommy Sale and Freddie Steele and Westland found it hard to establish himself into the starting eleven. He scored four goals in 14 matches in 1935–36 and played 23 games in 1936–37 again scoring four goals. In 1937–38 he played in 25 matches scoring seven goals including a hat-trick in an 8–1 victory over Derby County. In 1938–39 he played just twice scoring once. He continued to play for the club during the World War II before joining Mansfield Town in 1946.

== Personal life ==
His brother Douglas was also a footballer who played for Aberdeen and Stoke City.

== Career statistics ==
Club	Season	League			FA Cup		Total	
Club	Season	Division	Apps	Goals	Apps	Goals	Apps	Goals
Aberdeen	1934–35	Scottish Division One	3	2	0	0	3	2
Aberdeen	Total		3	2	0	0	3	2
Stoke City	1935–36	First Division	14	4	0	0	14	4
Stoke City	1936–37	First Division	21	4	2	0	23	4
Stoke City	1937–38	First Division	23	7	2	0	25	7
Stoke City	1938–39	First Division	2	1	0	0	2	1
Stoke City	Total		60	16	4	0	64	16
Mansfield Town	1946–47	Third Division North	10	0	1	0	11	0
Career Total			73	18	5	0	78	18
