= Bob Glassey =

English footballer

Personal information
- Full name: Robert John Glassey
- Date of birth: 13 August 1914
- Place of birth: Chester-le-Street, England
- Date of death: 1984 (aged 69–70)
- Position: Forward

Senior career*
Years	Team	Apps	(Gls)
1932–1935	Horden Colliery Welfare		
1935–1937	Liverpool	9	(4)
1932–1935	Horden Colliery Welfare		
1937–1938	Stoke City	0	(0)
1939–1940	Mansfield Town	3	(1)
1945–1946	Horden Colliery Welfare		
1946–1947	Stockton		
1947	West Stanley		
Total		12	(5)
- * Club domestic league appearances and goals

Robert John Glassey (13 August 1914 – 1984) was a footballer who played in the Football League for Liverpool and Mansfield Town.

== Career statistics ==
Club	Season	League			FA Cup		Total	
Club	Season	Division	Apps	Goals	Apps	Goals	Apps	Goals
Liverpool	1935–36	First Division	8	4	0	0	8	4
Liverpool	1936–37	First Division	1	0	0	0	1	0
Liverpool	Total		9	4	0	0	9	4
Stoke City	1937–38	First Division	0	0	0	0	0	0
Mansfield Town	1939–40	Third Division South	3	1	0	0	3	1
Career total			12	5	0	0	12	5
