= Stuart Cowden =

English footballer

Personal information
- Full name: Stuart Cowden
- Date of birth: February 1925
- Place of birth: Alsager, England
- Date of death: January 2016 (aged 90)
- Position: Half back

Senior career*
Years	Team	Apps	(Gls)
- Stoke Boy's Club
1942–1946	Stoke City	0	(0)
1947–1954	Witton Albion	374	
- * Club domestic league appearances and goals

Stuart Cowden (February 1925 – January 2016) was an English footballer who played for Stoke City.

== Career ==
Cowden joined Stoke City during World War II and went on to become a regular in the War League playing 50 matches. His only senior match came in the FA Cup during the 1945–46 season where he played in a 3–1 win against Burnley. He left the club at the end of the season after he decided to work at Rolls-Royce Limited in Crewe where he stayed for 50 years. He continued to play football for non-league Witton Albion. He died in January 2016, a few weeks short of his 91st birthday.

== Career statistics ==
Club	Season	League		FA Cup		Total	
Club	Season	Apps	Goals	Apps	Goals	Apps	Goals
Stoke City	1945–46	0	0	1	0	1	0
Career Total		0	0	1	0	1	0
