= Edwin Blunt =

English footballer (1918–1993)

Personal information
- Full name: Edwin Blunt
- Date of birth: 21 May 1918
- Place of birth: Brindley Ford, Stoke-on-Trent, England
- Date of death: 20 September 1993 (aged 75)
- Place of death: Hartshill, Stoke-on-Trent, England
- Positions: Half-back; inside forward

Youth career
- Lichfield City

Senior career*
Years	Team	Apps	(Gls)
1937	Port Vale	0	(0)
1937–1949	Northampton Town	87	(2)
1949–1950	Accrington Stanley	9	(1)
195?–195?	Northwich Victoria		
195?–195?	Congleton Town		
1951–1952	Macclesfield Town	10	(1)
Total		106	(4)
- * Club domestic league appearances and goals

Edwin Blunt (21 May 1918 – 20 September 1993) was an English footballer who played for Northampton Town and Accrington Stanley either side of World War II.

== Career ==
Blunt played for Lichfield City before joining Port Vale as an amateur in March 1937; he left the Old Recreation Ground without playing a first-team game in May 1937. He moved on to Northampton Town, but returned to Vale as a wartime guest in November 1939. He scored one goal in ten appearances and departed when the club went into abeyance in 1940. He stayed in the area and guested for Wrexham, Stoke City (scoring 7 goals in 29 games) and Crewe Alexandra, before returning to Vale in August 1944. He played six games before moving on in October 1944 to guest for Bury, Wolverhampton Wanderers and Stafford Rangers, heading back to Northampton at the war's end.

He made 87 appearances during his twelve years at Northampton, though those years did span the entire war, limiting his opportunities to play drastically. He helped the "Cobblers" to finish 13th in the Third Division South in 1946–47, and then 14th in 1947–48 and 20th in 1948–49. He then departed the County Ground and moved on to Accrington Stanley. He scored once in nine Third Division North games in 1949–50, and then left Peel Park and retired from professional football. He later represented Northwich Victoria and Congleton Town, before joining Cheshire County League side Macclesfield Town. He made his debut for the "Silkmen" against Buxton at Moss Rose on 13 August 1951. He made 12 league and FA Cup appearances for the club, scoring one goal.

== Career statistics ==
Appearances and goals by club, season and competition
Club	Season	League			FA Cup		Total	
Club	Season	Division	Apps	Goals	Apps	Goals	Apps	Goals
Port Vale	1936–37	Third Division North	0	0	0	0	0	0
Northampton Town	1937–38	Third Division South	2	0	0	0	2	0
Northampton Town	1938–39	Third Division South	26	1	1	0	27	1
Northampton Town	1945–46		0	0	4	2	0	0
Northampton Town	1946–47	Third Division South	30	1	3	1	33	2
Northampton Town	1947–48	Third Division South	14	0	0	0	14	0
Northampton Town	1948–49	Third Division South	15	0	0	0	15	0
Northampton Town	Total		87	2	8	3	95	5
Accrington Stanley	1949–50	Third Division North	9	1	0	0	9	1
Macclesfield Town	1951–52	Cheshire County League	10	1	2	0	12	1
Career total			106	4	10	3	116	7
