= Fred Basnett =

English footballer

Personal information
- Full name: Alfred Basnett
- Date of birth: 01 April 1922
- Place of birth: Stoke-on-Trent, England
- Date of death: 1997 (aged 72–73)
- Position: Forward

Senior career*
Years	Team	Apps	(Gls)
1945–1946	Stoke City	0	(0)
- Northwich Victoria
- * Club domestic league appearances and goals

Alfred Basnett (10 November 1924 – 1997) was an English professional footballer who played for Stoke City.

== Career ==
Basnett played for Stoke City during World War II along with his brother Albert. He was a useful goalscorer in the war leagues and made two appearances in the FA Cup in the 1945–46 season. At the end of the war Basnett left Stoke and went on to play for non-league Northwich Victoria.

== Career statistics ==
Appearances and goals by club, season and competition
Club	Season	League		FA Cup		Total	
Club	Season	Apps	Goals	Apps	Goals	Apps	Goals
Stoke City	1945–46	0	0	2	0	2	0
Career total		0	0	2	0	2	0
