= Jack Edwards (footballer, born 1921) =

English footballer

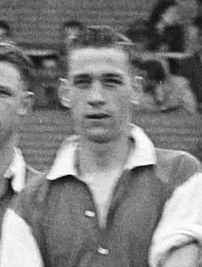
- Jack Edwards in 1948

Personal information
- Date of birth: 27 December 1921
- Place of birth: Wath-on-Dearne, England
- Date of death: March 2009 (aged 87)
- Place of death: Rotherham, South Yorkshire, England
- Position: Midfielder

Senior career*
Years	Team	Apps	(Gls)
- Manvers Main Colliery
1946–1954	Rotherham United	296	(9)
- * Club domestic league appearances and goals

Jack Edwards was a footballer who played in the Football League for Rotherham United and guested for Stoke City
