= Sid Clewlow =

English footballer

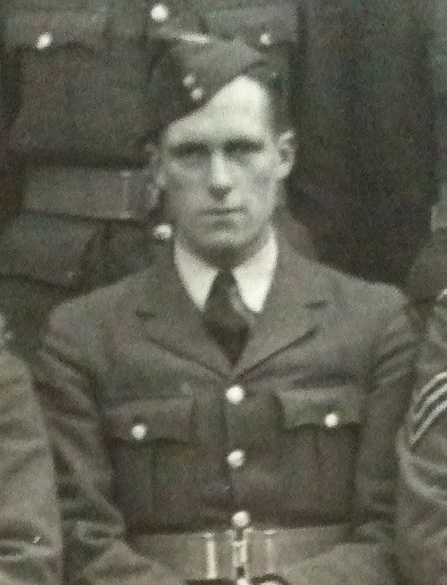
- Sid Clewlow whilst serving in the RAF.

Personal information
- Full name: Sidney John Clewlow
- Date of birth: 8 November 1919
- Place of birth: Wallasey, England
- Date of death: 1989 (aged 69–70)
- Place of death: Birkenhead, England
- Position: Wing half

Senior career*
Years	Team	Apps	(Gls)
1936–1937	St Joseph's CYMS		
1937–1938	Poulton Victoria		
1938–1939	New Brighton	0	(0)
1939–1940	Wolverhampton Wanderers	0	(0)
1946–1947	New Brighton	1	(0)
- * Club domestic league appearances and goals

Sidney John Clewlow (8 November 1919 – 1989) was a footballer who played in the Football League for New Brighton, Wolverhampton Wanderers and guested for Stoke City. He also guested for Aberdeen during the Second World War.

== Career statistics ==
Appearances and goals by club, season and competition
Club	Season	League			FA Cup		Total	
Club	Season	Division	Apps	Goals	Apps	Goals	Apps	Goals
New Brighton	1946–47	Third Division North	1	0	0	0	1	0
Career total			1	0	0	0	1	0
