= Alfred Massey =

English footballer

Personal information
- Full name: Alfred Massey
- Date of birth: 16 October 1918
- Place of birth: Stoke-on-Trent, England
- Date of death: 24 January 2006 (aged 87)
- Height: 5 ft 9 in (1.75 m)
- Position: Right half

Senior career*
Years	Team	Apps	(Gls)
–	Caversall Old Boys		
1934–1936	Congleton Town	15	(3)
1938–1939	Stoke City	2	(0)
–	Stafford Rangers		
- * Club domestic league appearances and goals

Alfred Massey (16 October 1918 – 24 January 2006) was an English footballer who played in the Football League for Stoke City. He also played for Congleton Town and Stafford Rangers.

== Career ==
Massey was born in Stoke-on-Trent and played amateur football with Caversall Old Boys and Congleton Town before joining Stoke City in 1938. He played twice in 1938–39 before his career was interrupted by World War II. He later played for Stafford Rangers.

Outside of football, Massey played cricket for Staffordshire in the Minor Counties Championship between 1937 and 1949.

== Career statistics ==
Appearances and goals by club, season and competition
Club	Season	League			FA Cup		Total	
Club	Season	Division	Apps	Goals	Apps	Goals	Apps	Goals
Stoke City	1938–39	First Division	2	0	0	0	2	0
Career total			2	0	0	0	2	0
