= 1937–38 Stoke City F.C. season =

Stoke City
1937–38 season
- Chairman: Mr H. Booth
- Manager: Bob McGrory
- Stadium: Victoria Ground
- Football League First Division: 17th (38 Points)
- FA Cup: Fourth Round
- Top goalscorer: League: Freddie Steele (15); All: Freddie Steele (15)
- Highest home attendance: 40,000 vs Arsenal (23 October 1937)
- Lowest home attendance: 11,787 vs Brentford (4 December 1937)
- Average home league attendance: 24,970
Home colours

The 1937–38 season was Stoke City's 38th season in the Football League and the 24th in the First Division.

It was a very up and down season for Stoke as they began well beating Derby County 8–1 in September to take them to the top of the table. However the season was dominated by a contract dispute between the board of directors and that of Stanley Matthews. Stoke's form dropped and they ended up being in a relegation fight which was won thanks to a 2–0 victory over Liverpool on the final day of the season.

== Season review ==
=== League ===
The family atmosphere within the club was still thriving, with the directors encouraging players to pay a 'thrift scheme' which would help the club financially but they received a major jolt when Stanley Matthews disputed the level of benefit to which he was entitled at the end of the season. Matthews did in fact refuse to re-sign for the new campaign stating that a player of his standing should receive the full £650 benefit rather than the normal £500. As a result, Stoke held him to his previous contract and Matthews was 21 days over the deadline before signing.

There were no major close season transfers, either in or out of the club but like previous seasons this proved to be no bad thing as the 1937–38 season got under way and, after a fine 8–1 victory over Derby County in mid September Stoke climbed to the top of the league. Sadly though as in the past injuries again interrupted the managers team and formation plans as both Freddie Steele and Charlie Scrimshaw suffered long-term injuries. In November 1937 Stoke accepted a £6,000 offer from West Bromwich Albion for Joe Johnson and in his place Bob McGrory selected Frank Baker. In October 1937 Stoke played Scottish champions Rangers in a benefit match for the victims of the Holditch Colliery disaster, raising £2,000 for the relief fund. A good sized crowd saw an entertaining 0–0 draw.

However, in the league Stoke's form fell away and Stoke slipped down the table and their performances were of 'poor quality' according to the local paper. In February and March with relegation a distinct possibility McGrory went out and signed Clement Smith from Chester, brought back Tommy Sale from Blackburn Rovers and swapped veteran Harry Davies for Port Vale's Tommy Ward. Stoke's injury jinx continued and with one game left at home to Liverpool Stoke required victory to keep their place in the First Division. To add to the drama star striker Freddie Steele arranged to get married on the morning of the match, he made it to the ground on time and scored a vital goal as Stoke won 2–0 to remain in the top division.

However the season was dominated by the continuing frictions between Matthews and the club board and in February 1938 Matthews handed in a transfer request after a fall out with manager Bob McGrory. Around 4,000 Stoke fans met with the directors at the King's Hall to see the board of directors come to the conclusion that Matthews must not leave. Matthews refused and reiterated his request to leave. Stoke rejected his request and Matthews wrote to the local paper thanking the fans for there support and he forged an uneasy truce with the management and board. Matthews pledged to do his best for his home town club and he did so until 1947 when he joined Blackpool.

=== FA Cup ===
Stoke exited at the fourth round this season losing at home 2–1 to Bradford Park Avenue in a replay.

== Final league table ==
Pos	Team	Pld	W	D	L	GF	GA	GAv	Pts
15	Huddersfield Town	42	17	5	20	55	68	0.809	39
16	Leicester City	42	14	11	17	54	75	0.720	39
17	Stoke City	42	13	12	17	58	59	0.983	38
18	Birmingham	42	10	18	14	58	62	0.935	38
19	Portsmouth	42	13	12	17	62	68	0.912	38

Source: World Football
Rules for classification: 1) Points; 2) Goal average; 3) Goals scored

== Results ==
Stoke's score comes first

=== Legend ===
Win	Draw	Loss

=== Football League First Division ===
Match	Date	Opponent	Venue	Result	Attendance	Scorers
1	28 August 1937	Birmingham	H	2–2	27,475	Matthews, Steele
2	30 August 1937	West Bromwich Albion	A	1–0	22,113	Tutin
3	4 September 1937	Middlesbrough	A	1–2	28,000	Soo
4	6 September 1937	West Bromwich Albion	H	4–0	20,320	Steele (3), Shaw (o.g.)
5	11 September 1937	Derby County	H	8–1	32,954	Steele (5), Westland (3)
6	15 September 1937	Liverpool	A	0–3	30,000	
7	18 September 1937	Portsmouth	H	3–1	22,580	Steele (2), Baker
8	25 September 1937	Chelsea	A	1–2	30,000	Westland
9	2 October 1937	Charlton Athletic	H	2–0	32,835	Steele, Baker
10	9 October 1937	Preston North End	A	1–2	20,000	Matthews
11	16 October 1937	Manchester City	A	0–0	41,207	
12	23 October 1937	Arsenal	H	1–1	40,000	Liddle
13	30 October 1937	Blackpool	A	1–0	13,000	Baker
14	6 November 1937	Wolverhampton Wanderers	H	1–1	37,930	Baker
15	13 November 1937	Bolton Wanderers	A	0–1	25,000	
16	20 November 1937	Sunderland	H	0–0	31,813	
17	27 November 1937	Everton	A	0–3	20,000	
18	4 December 1937	Brentford	H	3–0	11,787	Matthews (2), Steele
19	11 December 1937	Leicester City	A	0–2	12,000	
20	18 December 1937	Huddersfield Town	H	0–1	16,302	
21	25 December 1937	Grimsby Town	A	5–1	20,000	Baker (2), Westland, Antonio, Peppitt
22	27 December 1937	Grimsby Town	H	1–1	33,918	Baker
23	1 January 1938	Birmingham	A	1–1	25,000	Steele
24	15 January 1938	Middlesbrough	H	3–0	13,825	Baker, Matthews, Westland
25	29 January 1938	Portsmouth	A	0–2	15,000	
26	2 February 1938	Derby County	A	1–4	6,000	Westland
27	5 February 1938	Chelsea	H	2–1	22,509	Baker, Ward
28	19 February 1938	Preston North End	H	1–1	30,455	Ward
29	26 February 1938	Manchester City	H	3–2	20,000	Ward (2), Matthews
30	2 March 1938	Charlton Athletic	A	0–3	16,000	
31	5 March 1938	Arsenal	A	0–4	35,000	
32	12 March 1938	Blackpool	H	1–3	24,778	Baker
33	19 March 1938	Wolverhampton Wanderers	A	2–2	35,000	Sale, Smith
34	26 March 1938	Bolton Wanderers	H	3–2	19,249	Sale (3)
35	2 April 1938	Sunderland	A	1–1	28,000	Sale
36	9 April 1938	Everton	H	1–1	15,003	Peppitt
37	16 April 1938	Brentford	A	0–0	35,000	
38	18 April 1938	Leeds United	H	0–1	24,933	
39	19 April 1938	Leeds United	A	1–2	20,000	Peppitt
40	23 April 1938	Leicester City	H	1–2	16,355	Soo
41	2 May 1938	Huddersfield Town	A	0–3	17,000	
42	7 May 1938	Liverpool	H	2–0	21,408	Baker, Steele

=== FA Cup ===
Round	Date	Opponent	Venue	Result	Attendance	Scorers
R3	8 January 1938	Derby County	A	2–1	28,768	Baker, Bell (o.g)
R4	22 January 1938	Bradford Park Avenue	A	1–1	31,347	Soo
R4 Replay	26 January 1938	Bradford Park Avenue	H	1–2	7,000	Soo

== Squad statistics ==
Pos.	Name	League		FA Cup		Total	
Pos.	Name	Apps	Goals	Apps	Goals	Apps	Goals
GK	(Scotland) Douglas Westland	1	0	1	0	2	0
GK	(England) Norman Wilkinson	41	0	2	0	43	0
DF	(England) John Bamber	6	0	0	0	6	0
DF	(England) Harry Brigham	32	0	3	0	35	0
DF	(England) Jack Challinor	31	0	3	0	34	0
DF	(England) Charlie Scrimshaw	21	0	0	0	21	0
MF	(Scotland) Jock Kirton	9	0	3	0	12	0
MF	(England) Bill Moore	2	0	0	0	2	0
MF	(England) Billy Mould	10	0	0	0	10	0
MF	(England) Clement Smith	5	1	0	0	5	1
MF	(England) Frank Soo	42	2	3	2	45	4
MF	(England) Arthur Tutin	34	1	3	0	37	1
MF	(England) Arthur Turner	32	0	3	0	35	0
FW	(England) George Antonio	24	1	3	0	27	1
FW	(England) Frank Baker	41	11	3	1	44	12
FW	(England) Bob Glassey	0	0	0	0	0	0
FW	(England) Joe Johnson	1	0	0	0	1	0
FW	(England) Bobby Liddle	21	1	0	0	21	1
FW	(England) Syd Peppitt	4	3	1	0	5	3
FW	(England) Stanley Matthews	38	6	3	0	41	6
FW	(England) Alexander Ormston	6	0	0	0	6	0
FW	(England) Billy Robson	2	0	0	0	2	0
FW	(England) Tommy Sale	8	5	0	0	8	5
FW	(England) Freddie Steele	23	15	0	0	23	15
FW	(England) Tommy Ward	5	4	0	0	5	4
FW	(Scotland) James Westland	23	7	2	0	25	7
–	Own goals	–	1	–	1	–	2
