= George Antonio =

English footballer (1914–1997)

Personal information
- Full name: George Rowlands Antonio
- Date of birth: 20 October 1914
- Place of birth: Whitchurch, Shropshire, England
- Date of death: 2 July 1997 (aged 82)
- Place of death: Oswestry, Shropshire, England
- Position: Inside forward

Senior career*
Years	Team	Apps	(Gls)
1934	Oswestry Town		
1935–1946	Stoke City	84	(13)
1946–1947	Derby County	18	(2)
1948–1949	Doncaster Rovers	34	(7)
1949–1951	Mansfield Town	67	(2)
1951–1952	Oswestry Town		
1952–1953	Wellington Town		
1953–1954	Stafford Rangers		
1954–1955	Oswestry Town		
1955	Berriew		
Total		203	(24)
- * Club domestic league appearances and goals

George Rowlands Antonio (20 October 1914 – 2 July 1997) was an English footballer who played in the Football League for Derby County, Doncaster Rovers, Mansfield Town and Stoke City.

== Career ==
Antonio was born in Whitchurch, Shropshire, moving to Oswestry with his parents at age three. He started playing in the same county with non-league Oswestry Town before joining Stoke City in 1935. He made his Stoke debut against Liverpool on the final day of the 1935–36 season and established himself in the side the following season. He scored twice in a 10–3 win over West Bromwich Albion, Stoke's record victory. He played quite regularly in the next two seasons sharing positions with Bobby Liddle. In 1938 he was selected by the Wales Football Association for placing as an international for Wales but was dropped when he was discovered to have been born in England.

During World War II, during which he served in the army with the North Staffordshire Regiment, he guested for Nottingham Forest making three appearances in 1939–40 and seven appearances scoring 2 goals in 1940–41. In the 1945–46 season, he guested for Ipswich Town as well as a number of other clubs. He played 16 times for Stoke in 1946–47 season scoring five goals before joining Derby County in March 1947. In the year he was at Derby he played 18 matches and scored twice. He joined Doncaster Rovers for the 1948–49 season appearing 34 times and scoring seven goals, then signed for Mansfield Town from 1949 to 1950 playing 67, scoring twice.

== Career statistics ==
Club	Season	League			FA Cup		Total	
Club	Season	Division	Apps	Goals	Apps	Goals	Apps	Goals
Stoke City	1935–36	First Division	1	0	0	0	1	0
Stoke City	1936–37	First Division	20	3	2	0	22	3
Stoke City	1937–38	First Division	24	1	3	0	27	1
Stoke City	1938–39	First Division	23	4	2	0	25	4
Stoke City	1945–46	—			7	2	7	2
Stoke City	1946–47	First Division	16	5	0	0	16	5
Stoke City	Total		84	13	14	2	98	15
Derby County	1946–47	First Division	11	1	0	0	11	1
Derby County	1947–48	First Division	7	1	0	0	7	1
Derby County	Total		18	2	0	0	18	2
Doncaster Rovers	1948–49	Third Division North	24	3	1	1	25	4
Doncaster Rovers	1949–50	Third Division North	10	4	0	0	10	4
Doncaster Rovers	Total		34	7	1	1	35	8
Mansfield Town	1949–50	Third Division North	29	1	2	1	31	2
Mansfield Town	1950–51	Third Division North	38	1	6	0	44	1
Mansfield Town	Total		67	2	8	1	75	3
Career Total			203	24	23	4	226	28
