= Freddie Steele (footballer) =

English footballer & manager (1916–1976)

Personal information
- Full name: Frederick Charles Steele
- Date of birth: 6 May 1916
- Place of birth: Hanley, Stoke-on-Trent, England
- Date of death: 23 April 1976 (aged 59)
- Place of death: Newcastle-under-Lyme, England
- Height: 5 ft 10 1/2 in (1.79 m)
- Position: Forward

Youth career
- Downing's Tileries
- 1931–1933: Stoke City

Senior career*
Years	Team	Apps	(Gls)
1933–1949	Stoke City	224	(140)
1949–1951	Mansfield Town	53	(39)
1951–1953	Port Vale	25	(12)
Total		302	(191)

International career
1936–1937	England	6	(8)

Managerial career
- 1946: KR Reykjavík
- 1946: Iceland
- 1949–1951: Mansfield Town
- 1951–1957: Port Vale
- 1962–1965: Port Vale
- * Club domestic league appearances and goals

Frederick Charles Steele (6 May 1916 – 23 April 1976) was an English professional footballer who played as a forward for Stoke City and England. He also had spells at Mansfield Town and Port Vale as a player-manager, leading Vale to a league title. He remains a significant figure in the histories of both Stoke and Vale. His nephew is former England cricketer David Steele.

Signing with Stoke City in 1931 at the age of 15, he set a club record when he scored 33 league goals in the 1936–37 season. During the season, his 214-day-long international career also made for impressive reading, as he hit eight goals in six games for England. However, a series of misfortunes severely disrupted his playing career. Picking up a serious knee injury in 1937, he retired two years later after suffering from depression, aged just 23. After improving his physical and mental state, he resumed his career, only to have it cut short again, this time due to the outbreak of World War II. Guesting for several clubs, he also had a spell in Iceland where he coached KR Reykjavík. He was appointed manager of the national team for their first international match in 1946. He continued his Stoke career after the war before joining Mansfield Town as player-manager in 1949.

In 1951, he was appointed as Port Vale manager. His six years with the club were some of the most significant in the club's history, as he masterminded a Third Division North title-winning season, as well as the club's only FA Cup semi-final appearance. After the team he cultivated proved to be 'past it' by 1957, he too left the club. Returning as manager in 1962, his second spell would prove less successful, and he left the club for good three years later.

== Early and personal life ==
Frederick Charles Steele was born on 6 May 1916 in Hanley, Stoke-on-Trent. He was an uncle to cricketer David Steele. He married Ann, a sapper in AA company, in 1938. He ran the Plough Hotel in Stoke in the 1950s. He was posthumously inducted into the Stoke-on-Trent Sporting Hall of Fame in 2024.

== Club career ==
=== Stoke City ===
Freddie Steele was signed for Stoke City in 1931, aged 15, by manager Tom Mather. He carried out work in the club's offices until he was old enough to turn professional. He made his first-team debut on 22 December 1934, in a 4–1 win over Huddersfield Town in a First Division match at Leeds Road. He scored his first goal for the club four days later, in a 3–0 victory over West Bromwich Albion at the Victoria Ground. He was nicknamed "Nobby" by the club's supporters.

The departure of Tommy Sale meant Steele had to take up the mantle of top scorer for Bob McGrory's side. He did so with 33 goals in 35 league games in 1936–37, making him the First Division's top scorer – this tally also remains a club record to this date. His tally included five goals in a 10–3 victory over West Brom on 4 February, a club record victory.

He continued to terrorise the "Baggies" in 1937–38, scoring a hat-trick in a 4–0 home win on 6 September before getting five goals in an 8–1 trouncing of Derby County five days later. He finished the 1937–38 campaign with 15 goals in 23 games, having struggled to recover from a knee injury sustained in a game against Charlton Athletic. Steele then returned to form in 1938–39, scoring 27 goals in 33 matches, including four against Birmingham and a hat-trick against Chelsea. He then decided to retire due to depression in 1939, aged only 23. However, after receiving hypnosis treatment from psychiatrist, he opted to return to the game. The outbreak of World War II then halted his progress, as the English Football League was suspended. He guested for Sheffield United, Northampton Town, Notts County, Leicester City, Doncaster Rovers, Bradford Park Avenue, Leeds United, Nottingham Forest and Fulham.

He returned to the Potteries in 1945–46, scoring 49 goals in 43 games during the season. Competitive football resumed for the 1946–47 season. Steele scored 31 goals in 43 games, bagging hat-tricks against Middlesbrough, Sheffield United, Grimsby Town, and Burnley, as Stoke posted another fourth-place finish. He was Stoke's top-scorer for a sixth-successive season in 1947–48, though he hit just 12 goals in 23 appearances; his contribution as the campaign was limited as he spent four months on the sidelines with a broken leg. He hit 19 goals in 42 games in 1948–49, though Frank Bowyer had by then taken up the mantle as Stoke's main goal getter. Steele left the club in 1949 due to persistent knee problems. Nicknamed "Nobby" by fans, Steele scored 220 goals in 384 games in all competitions during his tenure at the club. He remains the second-highest scoring in the club's history, after John Ritchie.

=== Spell in Iceland ===
In April 1946, it was announced that Steele would travel to Iceland to become the manager of Úrvalsdeild club KR Reykjavík during the summer of that year. It his first coaching appointment with a senior side. However, he had previously coached in the youth teams at Stoke City. Under his guidance, the team won three, drew one and lost one of their five matches to finish as runners-up behind Fram. Steele was subsequently selected to manage the Iceland national team in its first international match against Denmark on 17 July 1946. Scottish coach Murdo McDougall, who had first moved to Iceland as Valur manager in 1937, was named as his assistant. Steele included several of his players from KR in the Iceland team, including Birgir Guðjónsson and Jón Örn Jónasson, but could not prevent the side losing 3–0 before a crowd of 8,000 spectators at the Melavöllur. Upon leaving Iceland on 17 August 1946, to return to England in time for the start of Stoke City's season, he spoke of how he had enjoyed his time in Iceland. He stated his desire to return the following summer, although the move never materialised.

=== Mansfield Town ===
Steele assumed a player-manager role at Mansfield Town in 1949. He was prolific in front of goal, scoring 44 goals in 62 league and cup appearances – this scoring record made his job as manager much easier. The "Stags" finished eighth in the Third Division North in 1949–50. They then went on a 23-game unbeaten run, but could only end up finishing as the division's runners-up in 1950–51, seven points behind champions Rotherham United. Steele signed players such as defender Don Bradley, and wing-half's Oscar Fox and Sid Watson. Steele left Field Mill for Port Vale for a four-figure fee in December 1951, and Mansfield finished the 1951–52 season in sixth place under his successor George Jobey.

=== Port Vale ===
Replacing the unpopular Ivor Powell in December 1951, Steele was a popular choice as the new player-manager. His team were bottom of the Third Division South table, However, he did not make any new signings, and he sold striker Walter Aveyard to Accrington Stanley for a four-figure fee. Steele turned around results using the players at his disposal, and Vale lost just four of their last twenty games of the season to finish a comfortable 13th. From 9 February until 8 September of the following season, the team set a club record 13 home wins.

Vale were moved to the Third Division North in 1952–53. Steele kept the playing squad as it was, deeming the players he inherited to have the potential to achieve promotion. Despite Ivor Powell coming back to haunt the club by leading Bradford City to victory on the opening day of the season, Vale showed their class by losing just seven of their remaining 41 games. Steele dropped himself as a player in December 1952 to focus on management, building up a strong side based around a formidable defence, mainly using local players, also favouring more experienced players over more youthful hopefuls. However, they finished in second-place, one point behind Oldham Athletic, and so were not promoted.

The 1953–54 season was the finest in the history of Port Vale, and Steele's team's achievements were built with almost exactly the same playing staff that were bottom of the league when Steele arrived at Vale Park. Vale's hard-working defensive five-some of Ray King (goalkeeper), Tommy Cheadle, Reg Potts, Stan Turner, and Roy Sproson were hailed as 'the Iron Curtain' or 'the Steele Curtain' (in honour of their manager). They finished top of the table with 69 points, eleven clear of second-placed Barnsley. Their 26 league goals conceded in a 46-game season was a record. Just five of these were conceded at home, another Football League record. This was based upon 30 clean sheets, again a Football League record. They also recorded a club record low of three league defeats. They were undefeated at home all season, continuing a 42 match unbeaten run started on 8 November 1952, that would last until 18 September 1954. His team's achievements were built on a settled squad of 19 players, twelve of which played regularly. However, the greatest success came in the FA Cup, where they beat Darlington, Southport, Queens Park Rangers, First Division teams Cardiff City and Blackpool, and finally Leyton Orient to reach the semi-finals. There Vale lost 2–1 to West Bromwich Albion at Villa Park in highly controversial fashion, as the "Baggies" were awarded a penalty despite the foul having occurred outside the box, and Vale also had a goal disallowed for offside.

The 1954–55 campaign would prove to be a disappointment, as the "Valiants" finished 17th in the Second Division. The team lost their defensive edge as Steele opted for a more attacking 'semi-continental style'. He added to his fire-power by signing experienced forward Cyril Done and young striker Len Stephenson. He organised a more defensive line-up for the 1955–56 campaign. He spent a club-record £7,000 for Tottenham Hotspur playmaker Eddie Baily. He gave a young Harry Poole his debut as Vale fell out of the promotion race by the end of the season to post a respectable 12th-place finish.

In preparation for the 1956–57 season, he signed Harry Anders, a winger from Manchester City, for 'a substantial fee'. However, injuries piled up as the 'old guard' of 1953–54 'cracked', whilst clever midfielder Eddie Baily was offloaded to Nottingham Forest for £7,000, a club that much more appreciated his considerable talents. With his team losing 13 of their last 17 games, Steele tendered his resignation on 15 January, saying, "I am quite prepared to face the consequences". His successor Norman Low was unable to rescue Vale's season. They were relegated in 1957.

Steele returned to Vale Park when he replaced Norman Low as manager in October 1962. He sold Bert Llewellyn to Northampton Town for £7,000 and Arthur Longbottom to Millwall for £2,000; before boosting his strike-force with Tony Richards from Walsall for £9,000. They finished 1962–63 third in the Third Division, four points shy of promotion. He spent big for the 1963–64 campaign, bringing in Northern Ireland international Billy Bingham from Everton for £15,000; Albert Cheesebrough from Leicester City for another £15,000; as well as Walsall's Tim Rawlings for £4,000 and winger Ron Smith from Crewe Alexandra for £6,500. In mid-season he further splashed out £12,000 for both ex-Scotland striker Jackie Mudie and left-back Ron Wilson, both from Stoke City. His team finished a disappointing 13th, though in the FA Cup they beat top-flight Birmingham City and held Liverpool to a goalless draw.

For the 1964–65 season, Steele tried and failed to sign "Spurs" striker Bobby Smith, and instead had to make do with Ron Andrew (£3,000 from Stoke City), as well as goalkeeper Reg Davies from Leyton Orient. The campaign started badly. Supporters were vocal in their criticism of the team's performances. Steele tried rotating the team and keeping a settled side, but results continued against the Vale. With the club bottom of the league despite the money he had spent in the transfer market, Steele left 'by mutual consent' in February 1965. His replacement, Jackie Mudie, could not prevent the club from sinking into the Fourth Division. Roy Sproson said that "he [Steele] had not got the enthusiasm or drive as before".

== International career ==
Steele was capped six times for England and scored in wins over Sweden and Finland. In the Sweden game, on 17 May 1937, Steele scored a first half hat-trick in a 4–0 win at the Råsunda Stadium. He scored eight goals for his country in total, However, a knee injury sustained in 1937 meant that he did not play for his country again.

== Style of play ==
Steele was noted for his brilliant heading ability. He had a strong physique and was able to battle with defenders willing to get physical with him. He could play with both feet and had a good turn of pace.

"In the penalty box he was lethal, clinical and merciless, firing in shots from the tightest of angles and the smallest of spaces ... a masterpiece of strength, endurance, polish and skill that more often than not resulted in a billowing net."

— Stanley Matthews describing Steele in his autobiography.

== Management style ==
Roy Sproson later said that "he [Steele] was a great psychologist. He was also a tremendous tactician and, looking back, was years ahead of his time." Graham Barnett told of how Steele would know every detail about all of his players and how the first team would idolise him for his inspirational personality. Tactically, he brought his wingers back to play four across the midfield and had one side of his team as quick powerful tacklers and the other side as neat and skilful. He emphasised teamwork and fitness.

Sproson described Steele as a very tense individual who "would disappear for the last five minutes and was to be found hiding in the toilet." Ray Hancock also said that Steele watched the games from the treatment room to distance himself from the pressure on the pitch, and even once left the ground entirely as he could not handle the stress of the occasion. In appearance Steele "used to wear a tweed trilby, a pair of black and white hooped football stockings with his suit and let his hair grow long!"

== Career statistics ==
=== Club ===
Appearances and goals by club, season and competition
Club	Season	League			FA Cup		Total	
Club	Season	Division	Apps	Goals	Apps	Goals	Apps	Goals
Stoke City	1934–35	First Division	9	1	0	0	9	1
Stoke City	1935–36	First Division	29	8	4	3	33	11
Stoke City	1936–37	First Division	35	33	2	3	37	36
Stoke City	1937–38	First Division	23	15	0	0	23	15
Stoke City	1938–39	First Division	31	26	2	1	33	27
Stoke City	1945–46		–		8	7	8	7
Stoke City	1946–47	First Division	38	29	5	2	43	31
Stoke City	1947–48	First Division	21	10	2	2	23	12
Stoke City	1948–49	First Division	38	18	4	1	42	19
Stoke City	Total		224	140	27	19	251	159
Mansfield Town	1949–50	Third Division North	22	18	2	1	24	19
Mansfield Town	1950–51	Third Division North	19	14	6	4	25	18
Mansfield Town	1951–52	Third Division North	12	7	1	0	13	7
Mansfield Town	Total		53	39	9	5	62	44
Port Vale	1951–52	Third Division South	14	7	0	0	14	7
Port Vale	1952–53	Third Division North	11	5	0	0	11	5
Port Vale	Total		25	12	0	0	25	12
Career total			302	191	36	24	338	215

=== International ===
Appearances and goals by national team and year
National team	Year	Apps	Goals
England	1936	2	0
England	1937	4	8
Total		6	8

== Managerial statistics ==
Team	From	To	Record				
Team	From	To	G	W	D	L	Win %
Mansfield Town	1 August 1949	24 December 1951	123	61	31	31	49.59
Port Vale	24 December 1951	15 January 1957	246	100	73	73	40.65
Port Vale	1 October 1962	28 February 1965	123	43	32	48	34.96
Total			498	207	137	154	41.57

== Honours ==
Port Vale

- Football League Third Division North: 1953–54

England

- British Home Championship: 1936–37
