= 1961–62 Manchester United F.C. season =

English football club season

Manchester United
1961–62 season
- Chairman: Harold Hardman
- Manager: Matt Busby
- First Division: 15th
- FA Cup: Semi-finals
- Top goalscorer: League: David Herd (14); All: David Herd (17)
- Highest home attendance: 63,468 vs Preston North End (14 March 1962)
- Lowest home attendance: 20,807 vs Aston Villa (15 January 1962)
- Average home league attendance: 36,904
Home colours	Away colours

The 1961–62 season was Manchester United's 60th season in the Football League, and their 17th consecutive season in the top division of English football. Unlike the previous season, United declined to enter the Football League Cup, which they continue to decline for the next four seasons.

New to the side for the 1961–62 season was David Herd, who had been the First Division's second highest goalscorer the previous season. He joined the United ranks for a fee of £40,000, and finished the season as the club's top scorer with 14 goals in the league and 17 in all competitions, although it was a disappointing season for the club as they finished 15th in the First Division.

== First Division ==
Date	Opponents	H / A	Result F–A	Scorers	Attendance
19 August 1961	West Ham United	A	1–1	Stiles	32,628
23 August 1961	Chelsea	H	3–2	Herd, Pearson, Viollet	45,847
26 August 1961	Blackburn Rovers	H	6–1	Herd (2), Quixall (2), Charlton, Setters	45,302
30 August 1961	Chelsea	A	0–2		42,248
2 September 1961	Blackpool	A	3–2	Viollet (2), Charlton	28,156
9 September 1961	Tottenham Hotspur	H	1–0	Quixall	57,135
16 September 1961	Cardiff City	A	2–1	Dawson, Quixall	29,251
18 September 1961	Aston Villa	A	1–1	Stiles	38,837
23 September 1961	Manchester City	H	3–2	Stiles, Viollet, own goal	56,345
30 September 1961	Wolverhampton Wanderers	H	0–2		39,457
7 October 1961	West Bromwich Albion	A	1–1	Dawson	25,645
14 October 1961	Birmingham City	H	0–2		30,674
21 October 1961	Arsenal	A	1–5	Viollet	54,245
28 October 1961	Bolton Wanderers	H	0–3		31,442
4 November 1961	Sheffield Wednesday	A	1–3	Viollet	35,998
11 November 1961	Leicester City	H	2–2	Giles, Viollet	21,567
18 November 1961	Ipswich Town	A	1–4	McMillan	25,755
25 November 1961	Burnley	H	1–4	Herd	41,029
2 December 1961	Everton	A	1–5	Herd	48,099
9 December 1961	Fulham	H	3–0	Herd (2), Lawton	22,193
16 December 1961	West Ham United	H	1–2	Herd	29,472
26 December 1961	Nottingham Forest	H	6–3	Lawton (3), Brennan, Charlton, Herd	30,822
13 January 1962	Blackpool	H	0–1		26,999
15 January 1962	Aston Villa	H	2–0	Charlton, Quixall	20,807
20 January 1962	Tottenham Hotspur	A	2–2	Charlton, Stiles	55,225
3 February 1962	Cardiff City	H	3–0	Giles, Lawton, Stiles	29,200
10 February 1962	Manchester City	A	2–0	Chisnall, Herd	49,959
24 February 1962	West Bromwich Albion	H	4–1	Charlton (2), Setters, Quixall	32,456
28 February 1962	Wolverhampton Wanderers	A	2–2	Herd, Lawton	27,565
3 March 1962	Birmingham City	A	1–1	Herd	25,817
17 March 1962	Bolton Wanderers	A	0–1		34,366
20 March 1962	Nottingham Forest	A	0–1		27,833
24 March 1962	Sheffield Wednesday	H	1–1	Charlton	31,322
4 April 1962	Leicester City	A	3–4	McMillan (2), Quixall	15,318
7 April 1962	Ipswich Town	H	5–0	Quixall (3), Setters, Stiles	24,976
10 April 1962	Blackburn Rovers	A	0–3		14,623
14 April 1962	Burnley	A	3–1	Brennan, Cantwell, Herd	36,240
16 April 1962	Arsenal	H	2–3	Cantwell, McMillan	24,258
21 April 1962	Everton	H	1–1	Herd	31,926
23 April 1962	Sheffield United	H	0–1		30,073
24 April 1962	Sheffield United	A	3–2	McMillan (2), Stiles	25,324
28 April 1962	Fulham	A	0–2		40,113

Pos	Team	Pld	W	D	L	GF	GA	GAv	Pts
13	Blackpool	42	15	11	16	70	75	0.933	41
14	Leicester City	42	17	6	19	72	71	1.014	40
15	Manchester United	42	15	9	18	72	75	0.960	39
16	Blackburn Rovers	42	14	11	17	50	58	0.862	39
17	Birmingham City	42	14	10	18	65	81	0.802	38

Source: World Football
Rules for classification: 1) Points; 2) Goal average; 3) Goals scored

== FA Cup ==
Date	Round	Opponents	H / A	Result F–A	Scorers	Attendance
6 January 1962	Round 3	Bolton Wanderers	H	2–1	Nicholson, Herd	42,202
31 January 1962	Round 4	Arsenal	H	1–0	Setters	54,082
17 February 1962	Round 5	Sheffield Wednesday	H	0–0		59,553
21 February 1962	Round 5 Replay	Sheffield Wednesday	A	2–0	Charlton, Giles	62,969
10 March 1962	Round 6	Preston North End	A	0–0		37,521
14 March 1962	Round 6 Replay	Preston North End	H	2–1	Herd, Charlton	63,468
31 March 1962	Semi-Final	Tottenham Hotspur	N	1–3	Herd	65,000

== Squad statistics ==
Pos.	Name	League		FA Cup		Total	
Pos.	Name	Apps	Goals	Apps	Goals	Apps	Goals
GK	(Northern Ireland) Ronnie Briggs	8	0	0	0	8	0
GK	(England) David Gaskell	21	0	7	0	28	0
GK	(Northern Ireland) Harry Gregg	13	0	0	0	13	0
FB	(Republic of Ireland) Shay Brennan	41	2	6	0	47	2
FB	(Republic of Ireland) Noel Cantwell	17	2	2	0	19	2
FB	(Republic of Ireland) Tony Dunne	28	0	7	0	35	0
HB	(England) Bill Foulkes	40	0	7	0	47	0
HB	(England) Frank Haydock	1	0	0	0	1	0
HB	(England) Nobby Lawton	20	6	7	0	27	6
HB	(Northern Ireland) Jimmy Nicholson	17	0	4	1	21	1
HB	(England) Maurice Setters	38	3	7	1	45	4
HB	(England) Nobby Stiles	34	7	4	0	38	7
FW	(England) Warren Bradley	6	0	1	0	7	0
FW	(England) Bobby Charlton	37	8	6	2	43	10
FW	(England) Phil Chisnall	9	1	4	0	13	1
FW	(Scotland) Alex Dawson	4	2	0	0	4	2
FW	(Republic of Ireland) Johnny Giles	30	2	7	1	37	3
FW	(Scotland) David Herd	27	14	5	3	32	17
FW	(Northern Ireland) Sammy McMillan	11	6	0	0	11	6
FW	(Scotland) Ian Moir	9	0	0	0	9	0
FW	(England) Mark Pearson	17	1	0	0	17	1
FW	(England) Albert Quixall	21	10	3	0	24	10
FW	(England) Dennis Viollet	13	7	0	0	13	7
–	Own goals	–	1	–	0	–	1
