= Tony Allen (footballer) =

English footballer (1939–2022)

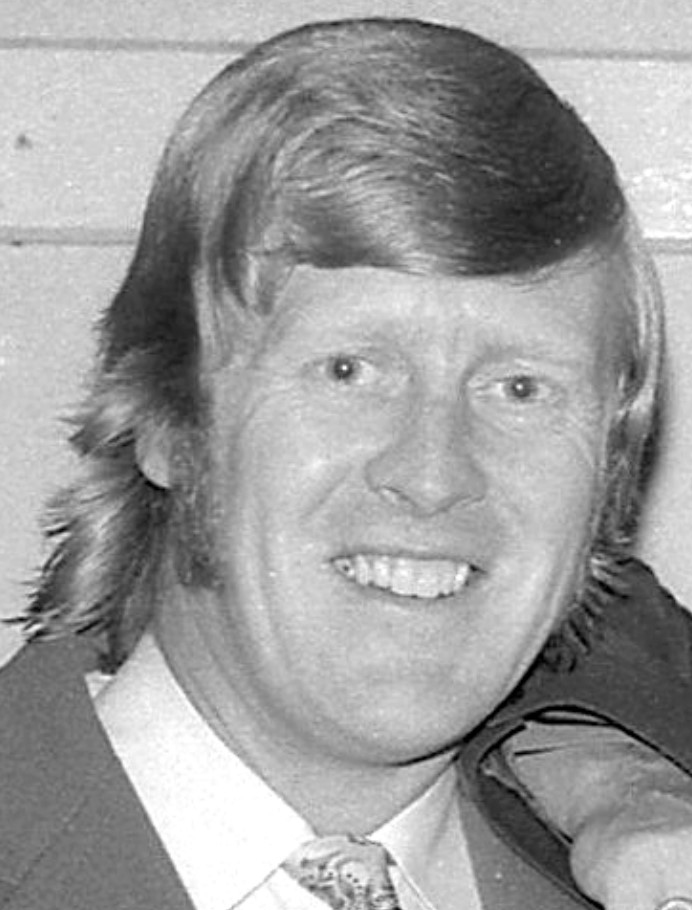
- Allen in 1973

Personal information
- Full name: Anthony Allen
- Date of birth: 27 November 1939
- Place of birth: Stoke-on-Trent, England
- Date of death: 2 December 2022 (aged 83)
- Place of death: Stoke-on-Trent, England
- Position: Left-back

Youth career
- Stoke Boy's Brigade

Senior career*
Years	Team	Apps	(Gls)
1957–1970	Stoke City	417	(2)
1970–1971	Bury	29	(0)
1971–1973	Hellenic		
1973	Stafford Rangers		
1973–1975	Nantwich Town		
Total		446	(2)

International career
- England U23
1959	England	3	(0)
- * Club domestic league appearances and goals

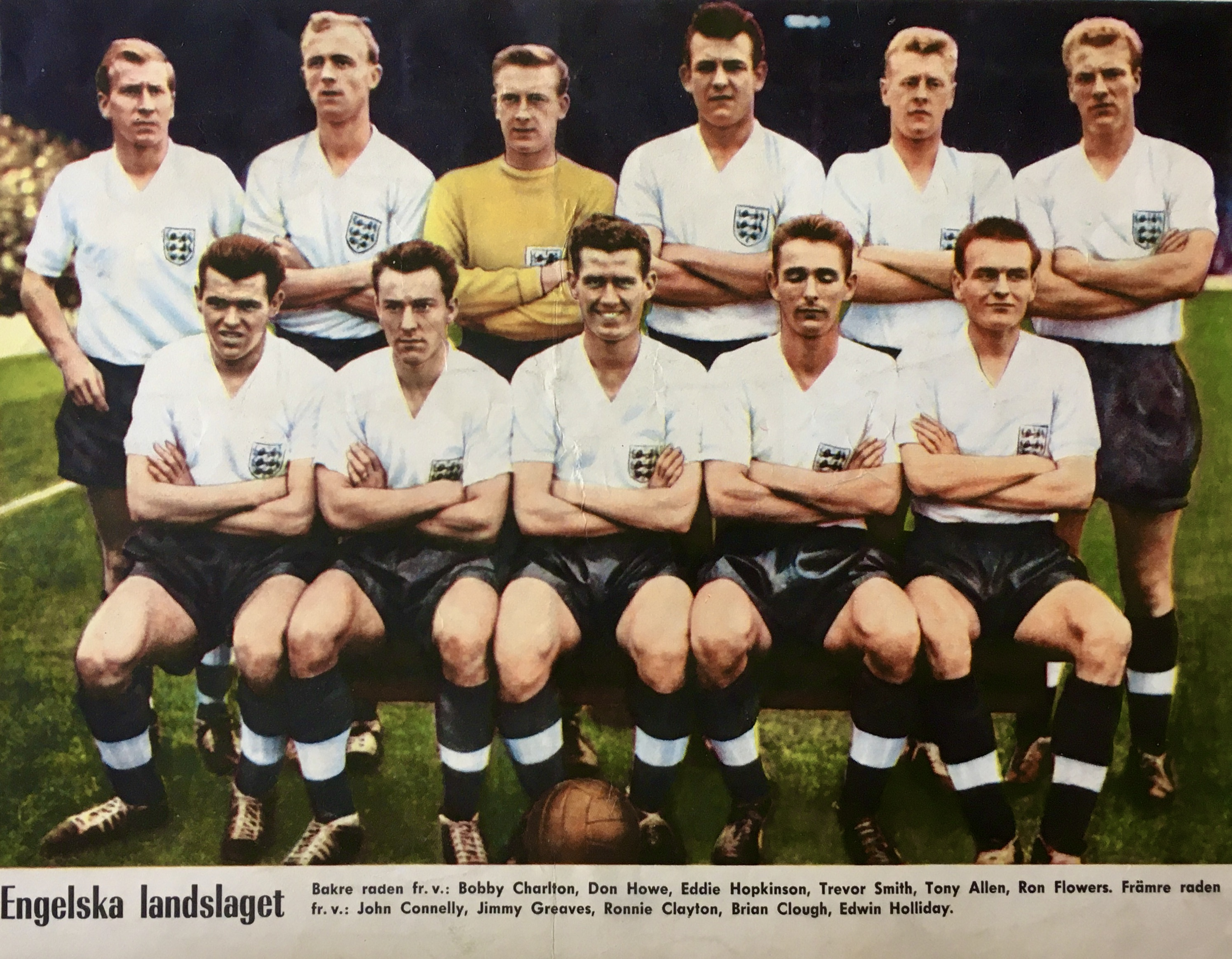
England national football team at Empire Stadium, London 28 October 1959. From the left, standing: Bobby Charlton, Don Howe, Eddie Hopkinson, Trevor Smith, Tony Allen, Ron Flowers; front row: John Connelly, Jimmy Greaves, Ronnie Clayton, Brian Clough and Edwin Holliday.

Anthony Allen (27 November 1939 – 2 December 2022) was an English footballer who played most of his club career as a left-back for Stoke City between 1957 and 1970. He also made three appearances for England in 1959, before his twentieth birthday.

== Career ==
Allen was born in Hanley in Stoke-on-Trent, and after playing football for his schools and the Boys' Brigade, he was signed by Stoke City as an amateur, before turning professional on his seventeenth birthday in November 1956. He instantly became a regular under Frank Taylor establishing himself at left-back with ease. Although playing outside the top division, his talents were soon spotted by the England selectors. After winning caps at youth and under-23 levels, he was called up for the full international side for a British Home Championship match against Wales in place of Jimmy Armfield on 17 October 1959. The match was drawn 1–1 and Allen was retained for the next two matches, against Sweden (a 3–2 defeat) and Northern Ireland (won 2–1). For the next international match the following April, Ray Wilson was preferred at left-back, remaining first choice for most of the next decade. Although he received further caps at under-23 level (earning seven in all) Allen was never selected again for the full England eleven. He remains one of only two players of modern times (the other being Nick Pickering) to have only played for England while still in his teens.

Under new manager Tony Waddington he became a vital member of 'Waddington's wall' a tactic which helped Stoke stave off the threat of relegation in 1960–61 and then gain promotion in 1962–63 by winning the Second Division title. He was ever-present throughout the 1960–61 and 1961–62 seasons, and only missed one game in the promotion season. In this period, he clocked up a run of 148 consecutive appearances, which remains a Stoke record. Stoke finished their first season back in the First Division in 17th place, and also reached the final of the League Cup in 1964, where they were defeated by Leicester City 4–3 on aggregate.

In 1967, Allen was involved in an incident which led to a major change in the International Laws of Association Football. On 13 May 1967, Stoke City visited Old Trafford to play Manchester United. Paddy Crerand of United had an altercation with Peter Dobing of Stoke, which was dealt with by referee Pat Partridge holding Crerand close, such that his head was over the referee's shoulder. Unknown to the official, TV cameras picked up Crerand's action of spitting over his shoulder at Allen. Crerand and Dobing were cautioned for their confrontation, but Partridge had not seen the spitting incident. Partridge later received a letter from the Football League, asking for his observations on the incident, in response to many complaints received. Partridge was unable to respond with conclusive evidence, but nevertheless the International Board changed the Laws of the Game to put spitting on a par with violent conduct, and therefore a dismissible offence.

Midway through the 1966–67 season Allen's pace began to desert him, so Waddington switched him to centre back alongside Maurice Setters and this allowed him to prolong his career until Willie Stevenson was signed from Liverpool in 1967. After drifting in and out of the side for 18 months, Allen left Stoke in October 1970, when he moved to Bury for a fee of £10,000. He was given a joint testimonial match along with Eric Skeels against Derby County in February 1969.

After a year with the Gigg Lane club, he moved to Cape Town to play for Hellenic. He returned to England in October 1973, and ended his playing career with non-league Nantwich Town after a spell with Stafford Rangers.

== After football ==
After ending his playing career, he returned to Stoke where he became a newsagent in Blythe Bridge. Allen also helped to coach local junior clubs.

Allen died at the Royal Stoke University Hospital on 2 December 2022, at the age of 83. His funeral took place at Carmountside Crematorium in Stoke on 23 December.

== Career statistics ==
=== Club ===
Appearances and goals by club, season and competition
Club	Season	League			FA Cup		League Cup		Total	
Club	Season	Division	Apps	Goals	Apps	Goals	Apps	Goals	Apps	Goals
Stoke City	1957–58	Second Division	34	0	5	0	—		39	0
Stoke City	1958–59	Second Division	36	0	2	0	—		38	0
Stoke City	1959–60	Second Division	39	0	2	0	—		41	0
Stoke City	1960–61	Second Division	42	0	6	0	1	0	49	0
Stoke City	1961–62	Second Division	42	1	3	1	2	0	47	2
Stoke City	1962–63	Second Division	41	0	1	0	2	0	44	0
Stoke City	1963–64	First Division	41	0	5	0	10	0	56	0
Stoke City	1964–65	First Division	37	0	3	0	3	0	43	0
Stoke City	1965–66	First Division	17	0	1	0	0	0	18	0
Stoke City	1966–67	First Division	22	0	0	0	0	0	22	0
Stoke City	1967–68	First Division	38	0	2	0	5	1	45	1
Stoke City	1968–69	First Division	20	1	0	0	2	0	22	1
Stoke City	1969–70	First Division	8	0	0	0	1	0	9	0
Stoke City	Total		417	2	30	1	26	1	473	4
Bury	1970–71	Third Division	28	0	3	0	0	0	31	0
Bury	1971–72	Fourth Division	1	0	0	0	0	0	1	0
Bury	Total		29	0	3	0	0	0	32	0
Career total			446	2	33	1	26	1	505	4

=== International ===
Appearances and goals by national team and year
National team	Year	Apps	Goals
England	1959	3	0
Total		3	0

== Honours ==
Stoke City

- Football League Second Division: 1962–63
- Football League Cup runner-up: 1963–64
