= 1966–67 Stoke City F.C. season =

Stoke City
1966–67 season
- Chairman: Albert Henshall
- Manager: Tony Waddington
- Stadium: Victoria Ground
- Football League First Division: 12th (41 Points)
- FA Cup: Third Round
- League Cup: Second Round
- Top goalscorer: League: Peter Dobing (19); All: Peter Dobing (19)
- Highest home attendance: 44,337 vs Manchester United (7 September 1966)
- Lowest home attendance: 14,606 vs Arsenal (1 April 1967)
- Average home league attendance: 25,933
Home colours

The 1966–67 season was Stoke City's 60th season in the Football League and the 36th in the First Division.

England won the 1966 World Cup and one of the winners, Gordon Banks joined Stoke in April 1967 in what was a master stroke signing by Tony Waddington he also brought in Arsenal winger George Eastham. On the pitch Stoke continued to finish in mid table this time in 12th spot.

== Season review ==
=== League ===
1966 saw Albert Henshall return to the club as chairman and England won the World Cup, two of Alf Ramsey's squad would sign for Stoke within the next twelve months. In the summer of 1966 Waddington secured the services of former Newcastle United winger George Eastham from Arsenal for £35,000. The other was goalkeeper Gordon Banks who was snapped up for a bargain £52,000 from Leicester City in April 1967. Matt Gillies, the Leicester manager was coming under considerable pressure to play his young reserve Peter Shilton and decided to sell the 29-year-old Banks to Stoke. It is widely considered that this was a 'steal' as Banks carried on to play for England for another five years. Banks left English football in 1972 and ironically Stoke signed Shilton as his replacement.

Stoke had a fine, enterprising squad in 1966–67 and they ran up some fine results, beating eventual champions Manchester United 3–0 as well as Tottenham Hotspur, Nottingham Forest, Everton and West Bromwich Albion all before October. However, with Stoke looking forward to a potentially great season the fans were shocked when John Ritchie was sold to Sheffield Wednesday for £70,000 in November 1966. Whilst Wednesday paid a lot of money for Ritchie it came as a surprise as a month before Stoke had sold unsuccessful reserve striker John Woodward to Aston Villa for £30,000. But Ritchie's departure was soon forgotten as the team battled on holding on to a mid-table position.

=== FA Cup ===
Stoke failed to make it past the third round losing by two goals to nil against Manchester United at Old Trafford.

=== League Cup ===
Walsall again proved to Stoke's cup bogey side beating Stoke 2–1 at Fellows Park.

== Final league table ==
Pos	Team	Pld	W	D	L	GF	GA	GAv	Pts
10	Sheffield United	42	16	10	16	52	59	0.881	42
11	Sheffield Wednesday	42	14	13	15	56	47	1.191	41
12	Stoke City	42	17	7	18	63	58	1.086	41
13	West Bromwich Albion	42	16	7	19	77	73	1.055	39
14	Burnley	42	15	9	18	66	76	0.868	39

Source: World Football
Rules for classification: 1) Points; 2) Goal average; 3) Goals scored

== Results ==
Stoke's score comes first

=== Legend ===
Win	Draw	Loss

=== Football League First Division ===
Match	Date	Opponent	Venue	Result	Attendance	Scorers
1	20 August 1966	Nottingham Forest	A	2–1	21,949	Dobing, Palmer
2	24 August 1966	Tottenham Hotspur	H	2–0	33,086	Burrows, Ritchie
3	27 August 1966	Fulham	H	1–2	26,333	Burrows
4	31 August 1966	Tottenham Hotspur	A	0–2	37,983	
5	3 September 1966	Everton	A	1–0	44,005	Dobing
6	7 September 1966	Manchester United	H	3–0	44,337	Ritchie (2), Palmer
7	10 September 1966	West Ham United	H	1–1	27,274	Dobing
8	17 September 1966	Sheffield United	H	3–0	21,374	Dobing (2), Wagstaff (o.g.)
9	24 September 1966	West Bromwich Albion	A	1–0	25,483	Ritchie
10	1 October 1966	Leeds United	H	0–0	28,987	
11	8 October 1966	Sheffield Wednesday	A	3–1	28,047	Dobing, Ritchie, Burrows
12	15 October 1966	Southampton	H	3–2	25,554	Dobing, Ritchie, Palmer
13	25 October 1966	Sunderland	A	1–2	23,320	Viollet
14	29 October 1966	Liverpool	H	2–0	37,933	Dobing, Ritchie
15	5 November 1966	Southampton	A	2–3	23,270	Viollet, Ritchie
16	12 November 1966	Manchester City	H	0–1	27,803	
17	19 November 1966	Blackpool	A	1–0	16,172	Burrows
18	26 November 1966	Chelsea	H	1–1	28,446	Dobing
19	3 December 1966	Leicester City	A	2–4	26,079	Burrows, Vernon
20	10 December 1966	Aston Villa	H	6–1	20,232	Burrows (3), Vernon, Dobing, Eastham
21	17 December 1966	Nottingham Forest	H	1–2	23,304	Burrows
22	26 December 1966	Burnley	A	2–0	29,990	Burrows, Setters
23	27 December 1966	Burnley	H	4–3	38,402	Burrows (2), Dobing, Bridgwood
24	31 December 1966	Fulham	A	1–4	24,851	Vernon
25	7 January 1967	Everton	H	2–1	27,650	Dobing, Palmer
26	14 January 1967	West Ham United	A	1–1	33,293	Burrows
27	22 January 1967	Sheffield United	A	1–2	21,486	Dobing
28	4 February 1967	West Bromwich Albion	H	1–1	26,211	Dobing
29	11 February 1967	Leeds United	A	0–3	37,370	
30	25 February 1967	Sheffield Wednesday	H	0–2	27,164	
31	4 March 1967	Liverpool	A	1–2	48,591	Dobing
32	18 March 1967	Sunderland	H	3–0	17,171	Palmer, Dobing, Burrows
33	24 March 1967	Newcastle United	A	1–3	39,408	Burrows
34	25 March 1967	Aston Villa	A	1–2	20,996	Mahoney
35	27 March 1967	Newcastle United	H	0–1	17,802	
36	1 April 1967	Arsenal	H	2–2	14,606	Burrows, Dobing
37	12 April 1967	Manchester City	A	1–3	25,753	Dobing
38	15 April 1967	Blackpool	H	2–0	12,259	Burrows, Mahoney
39	22 April 1967	Chelsea	A	0–1	23,973	
40	29 April 1967	Leicester City	H	3–1	17,870	Dobing, Burrows, Mahoney
41	6 May 1967	Arsenal	A	1–3	24,611	Bridgwood
42	13 May 1967	Manchester United	A	0–0	61,071	

=== FA Cup ===
Round	Date	Opponent	Venue	Result	Attendance	Scorers
R3	28 January 1967	Manchester United	A	0–2	63,497	

=== League Cup ===
Round	Date	Opponent	Venue	Result	Attendance	Scorers
R2	9 September 1966	Walsall	A	1–2	13,600	Ritchie

=== Cleveland Stokers ===
Stoke were one of a number of teams exported to the USA to play in the United Soccer Association in 1967 to help promote the sport in the country. Stoke represented Cleveland, Ohio and went under the name of the Cleveland Stokers and finished 2nd in their group.

In the travelling Stoke party included the likes of Gordon Banks, Peter Dobing, George Eastham, Maurice Setters and Roy Vernon as well as manager Tony Waddington. The team started well going undefeated in their first seven matches defeating Washington Whips 2–1, Boston Rovers 1–0, San Francisco Golden Gate Gales and Dallas Tornado both 4–1. They then suffered back to back 2–1 defeats to New York Skyliners and Houston Stars before a 2–0 win over Toronto City put them back on track for a play-off place. However a goalless draw with Detroit Cougars and a 3–1 defeat in the final match against Vancouver Royals saw the Stokers miss out on a play-off spot by a single point.

Match	Date	Opponent	Venue	Result	Scorers
1	27 May 1967	Washington Whips	A	2–1	Setters, Vernon
2	31 May 1967	Chicago Mustangs	H	1–1	Bernard
3	3 June 1967	Boston Rovers	H	1–0	Setters
4	7 June 1967	Los Angeles Wolves	H	0–0	
5	10 June 1967	San Francisco Golden Gate Gales	H	4–1	Dobing (2), Setters, Vernon
6	13 June 1967	Washington Whips	H	2–2	Dobing, Eastham
7	17 June 1967	Dallas Tornado	A	4–1	Dobing (2), Skeels, Burrows
8	25 June 1967	New York Skyliners	H	1–2	Bloor
9	27 June 1967	Houston Stars	A	1–2	Burrows
10	1 July 1967	Toronto City	H	2–0	Dobing, Burrows
11	5 July 1967	Detroit Cougars	A	0–0	
12	9 July 1967	Vancouver Royals	A	1–3	Dobing

=== Friendlies ===
Match	Opponent	Venue	Result
1	Home Farm	A	2–1
2	Cork Celtic	A	4–1
3	Limerick	A	3–1
4	Portsmouth	A	1–1
5	Oldham Athletic	A	5–0
6	Millwall	A	2–1
7	Exeter City	A	2–2
8	Plymouth Argyle	A	1–2
9	Rangers	H	3–1
10	England XI	H	5–7

== Squad statistics ==
Pos.	Name	League		FA Cup		League Cup		Total	
Pos.	Name	Apps	Goals	Apps	Goals	Apps	Goals	Apps	Goals
GK	(England) Gordon Banks	4	0	0	0	0	0	4	0
GK	(England) John Farmer	34	0	1	0	1	0	36	0
GK	(Northern Ireland) Harry Gregg	2	0	0	0	0	0	2	0
GK	(England) Paul Shardlow	2	0	0	0	0	0	2	0
DF	(England) Tony Allen	22	0	0	0	0	0	22	0
DF	(England) Bill Bentley	6(1)	0	0	0	0	0	6(1)	0
DF	(England) Alan Bloor	30(1)	0	1	0	1	0	32(1)	0
DF	(England) Calvin Palmer	38	5	1	0	1	0	40	5
DF	(England) Eric Skeels	40	0	1	0	1	0	42	0
MF	(England) Mike Bernard	4(1)	0	0	0	0	0	4(1)	0
MF	(England) Gerry Bridgwood	24(1)	2	0	0	1	0	25(1)	2
MF	(England) George Eastham	41	1	1	0	1	0	43	1
MF	(Wales) John Mahoney	11	3	0	0	0	0	11	3
MF	(England) Alan Philpott	23(3)	0	1	0	0	0	24(3)	0
MF	(England) Maurice Setters	28	1	1	0	1	0	30	1
MF	(England) John Woodward	1(1)	0	0	0	0	0	1(1)	0
FW	(England) Harry Burrows	42	17	1	0	1	0	44	17
FW	(England) Peter Dobing	41	19	1	0	1	0	43	19
FW	(England) Gerry Jones	2	0	0	0	0	0	2	0
FW	(England) John Ritchie	14	8	0	0	1	1	15	9
FW	(England) Dennis Viollet	33(1)	2	1	0	1	0	35(1)	2
FW	(Wales) Roy Vernon	20	4	1	0	0	0	21	4
–	Own goals	–	1	–	0	–	0	–	1
