= John Ritchie (footballer, born 1941) =

English footballer (1941–2007)

Personal information
- Full name: John Henry Ritchie
- Date of birth: 12 July 1941
- Place of birth: Kettering, England
- Date of death: 23 February 2007 (aged 65)
- Position: Forward

Senior career*
Years	Team	Apps	(Gls)
1960–1962	Kettering Town	76	(40)
1962–1966	Stoke City	110	(64)
1966–1969	Sheffield Wednesday	89	(34)
1969–1975	Stoke City	159	(71)
Total		434	(209)

International career
1965	United Kingdom	1	(1)
- * Club domestic league appearances and goals

John Henry Ritchie (12 July 1941 – 23 February 2007) was an English footballer. He is Stoke City's all-time record goalscorer.

Ritchie began his career with his hometown club Kettering Town before joining Stoke City in 1962. In his first full season as a professional Ritchie scored an impressive 30 goals and hit 81 goals in 135 appearances. He was surprisingly sold by Tony Waddington to Sheffield Wednesday in November 1966 for £80,000. After scored 45 goals for Wednesday in three seasons Waddington decided that selling Ritchie was a mistake and re-signed him for £28,000. He continued to be a prolific goalscorer for Stoke City and helped them win their first major trophy, the 1972 Football League Cup and reach two FA Cup semi finals. He remained at Stoke until September 1974 when a broken leg ended his career. He had scored 176 goals for Stoke in 351 matches making him Stoke's record goalscorer.

== Career ==
Born in Kettering, Ritchie is Stoke City's top marksman of all-time having scored 176 goals in 351 games during two spells at the club, from June 1962 to November 1966, and from July 1969 to May 1975.

In September 1961 Stoke City manager Tony Waddington was in a telephone conversation with a fellow manager who bemoaned the fact despite finding a fine non-league player his club could not afford him. At the end of that conversation Waddington rang around several colleagues to ask about John Ritchie, and he learned of a big strong striker who had scored 40 goals for non-league Kettering Town. Impressed by what he heard Waddington contacted Kettering and completed the deal immediately despite never seeing him play. Ritchie actually took a pay drop to join Stoke as he had been working in a local shoe factory and playing part-time. In his first season at Stoke Ritchie only made sporadic appearances while Dennis Viollet and Jackie Mudie held sway in the first team.

Three months into the 1963–64 season he was given his chance in place of the injured Viollet. Ritchie grabbed it with both hands and scored twice in a 4–3 win over Bolton Wanderers. That sparked a scoring streak of fifteen goals in nine games, breaking Jack Peart's 1910 club record for scoring in consecutive matches, although only six of Ritchie's were in the League. The run was rounded off in a 4–4 draw against Sheffield Wednesday by Ritchie's first hat-trick. He also set a formative record for the club in the League Cup scoring ten goals which has only been beaten twice. Ritchie's goals helped Stoke reach their first ever cup final, the 1964 Football League Cup. Stoke played two legs against Leicester City and lost 4–3. He twice scored four in a match, against Sheffield Wednesday in April 1965 and Northampton Town in February 1966 a feat not to be matched until 2000.

Ritchie scored thirty goals in his first full season as a professional and 29 the following season and was a firm terrace favourite. It came as a huge shock then when in November 1966 he was sold to Sheffield Wednesday for £80,000. It was even more surprising as Stoke had sold reserve forward John Woodward to Aston Villa for £30,000. Tony Waddington later admitted that selling Ritchie was a mistake. Ritchie's time at Hillsborough was not that great as after two good seasons he had a poor 1968–69 campaign and new Wednesday manager Danny Williams decided that he was past his best and Waddington took the chance to rectify his error and bought him back for £28,000.

Ritchie returned as Jimmy Greenhoff arrived, and the pair struck a productive partnership which the local media described as 'telepathic'. Ritchie top scored in 1970–71, 1971–72 and 1973–74 as he helped Stoke reach two FA Cup semi finals in 1971 and 1972, losing both times to Arsenal. Stoke did reach the 1972 Football League Cup Final and beat Chelsea 2–1 to claim their first major trophy. Ritchie continued to play for Stoke until he broke his leg in September 1974 ending his career. He scored a club record 176 goals in 351 appearances for Stoke.

== After football ==
The 6 foot 2 hitman ended his career after a double leg fracture in 1975. After retiring from football, he concentrated on his pottery business based in Stoke. John Ritchie died on 23 February 2007 at the age of 65. His son David was on the books at Stoke in the late 1989 but never made an appearance being sold to Stockport County for £10,000 in March 1990.

== Style of play ==
Standing 6 ft 2 in tall and weighing 12 st 4 lbs, Ritchie was christened 'Big' John Ritchie by Stoke supporters. He was one of a dying breed of direct and fast centre forwards in the mould of a Freddie Steele, Tommy Lawton and Nat Lofthouse, Ritchie used his burly frame to good effect, shrugging off defenders with ease.

== Legacy ==
He is remembered by a bust behind the Boothen End at Stoke's Bet365 Stadium. On the bust is a plaque which reads:

John Henry Ritchie was born on 12th July 1941 in Kettering where he began his footballing life playing for his home club of Kettering Town. On the enthusiastic recommendation of a talent scout, he was signed by Tony Waddington for Stoke City, moving up to Staffordshire from Northamptonshire in May 1962. His wife Shirley remembers crying all the way but they were to settle happily here in The Potteries. In April 1963, he made his professional debut alongside Sir Stanley Matthews. In his first season, Stoke were promoted from the Second Division to the top tier of English football. Playing in the First Division was a challenge John rose to superbly, ending that season with 30 goals. His brave performances elevated him to cult status and he would go on to score a remarkable number of goals in the following three seasons. Despite scoring 30 goals in 47 appearances in his third season at the club, he was sold for £70,000 in 1966 to Sheffield Wednesday where he made 89 appearances and scored 34 goals. After three seasons, fans rejoiced to see John rejoin his beloved Stoke City in the Summer of 1969 for the fee of £25,000. He repaid the fans' adulation with more goals and heroic displays, leading the attack for the following six campaigns, reaching the FA Cup semi-finals twice and winning the League Cup trophy in 1972. John's career was cut short in 1974 with a double fracture of his leg. He scored an incredible 176 goals in 351 appearances for Stoke. He is Stoke City's top marksman of all time and lives on in our hearts of as one of Staffordshire's greatest sporting heroes.

== Career statistics ==
Appearances and goals by club, season and competition
Club	Season	League			FA Cup		League Cup		Other		Total	
Club	Season	Division	Apps	Goals	Apps	Goals	Apps	Goals	Apps	Goals	Apps	Goals
Kettering Town	1960–61	Southern League					—		—			
Kettering Town	1961–62	Southern League					—		—			
Kettering Town	Total		76	40			—		—		76	40
Stoke City	1962–63	Second Division	3	0	1	0	1	0	—		5	0
Stoke City	1963–64	First Division	29	18	4	2	9	10	—		42	30
Stoke City	1964–65	First Division	41	25	3	2	5	2	—		49	29
Stoke City	1965–66	First Division	23	13	1	0	0	0	—		24	13
Stoke City	1966–67	First Division	14	8	0	0	1	1	—		15	9
Stoke City	Total		110	64	9	4	16	13	—		135	81
Sheffield Wednesday	1966–67	First Division	24	10	4	5	0	0	—		28	15
Sheffield Wednesday	1967–68	First Division	41	18	4	3	4	1	—		49	22
Sheffield Wednesday	1968–69	First Division	24	6	4	2	1	0	—		29	8
Sheffield Wednesday	Total		89	34	12	10	5	1	—		106	45
Stoke City	1969–70	First Division	32	14	2	2	1	0	—		35	16
Stoke City	1970–71	First Division	27	13	5	6	2	0	6 (Note: Four appearances and three goals in Anglo-Italian Cup and two appearances in Texaco Cup)	3	40	22
Stoke City	1971–72	First Division	32	12	9	2	12	4	7 (Note: Four appearances and two goals in Anglo-Italian Cup and four appearances and three goals in Texaco Cup)	4	60	22
Stoke City	1972–73	First Division	31	14	1	0	3	1	2 (Note: Appearances in UEFA Cup)	1	37	16
Stoke City	1973–74	First Division	30	14	1	1	4	0	2 (Note: Appearances in Texaco Cup)	0	37	15
Stoke City	1974–75	First Division	7	4	0	0	0	0	0	0	7	4
Stoke City	Total		159	71	18	11	22	5	17	8	216	95
Stoke City total			269	135	27	15	38	18	17	8	351	176
Career total			434	209	39	25	43	19	17	8	533	261

== Honours ==
Stoke City

- Football League Second Division: 1962–63
- Football League Cup: 1971–72; runner-up: 1963–64
- Watney Cup: 1973
