= 1965–66 Stoke City F.C. season =

Stoke City
1965–66 season
- Chairman: Mr G. Taylor
- Manager: Tony Waddington
- Stadium: Victoria Ground
- Football League First Division: 10th (42 Points)
- FA Cup: Fourth Round
- League Cup: Third Round
- Top goalscorer: League: John Ritchie (13); All: Peter Dobing & John Ritchie (13)
- Highest home attendance: 36,667 vs Manchester United (19 February 1966)
- Lowest home attendance: 11,602 vs Sheffield Wednesday (4 May 1966)
- Average home league attendance: 22,503
Home colours

The 1965–66 season was Stoke City's 59th season in the Football League and the 35th in the First Division.

Stoke had an inconsistent season as they found themselves being able to score a good number of goals but at the same time conceded many as well, scoring 65 goals and conceding 64. Stoke's final league position in 1965–66 was 10th, a modest improvement on the previous campaign.

== Season review ==
=== League ===
The manager, chairman, directors and the supporters, all seemed happy with the squad for the 1965–66 season. But problems arose in defence as they started to concede a worrying number of goals with West Bromwich Albion hitting six while Burnley, Nottingham Forest, Sheffield Wednesday all put four past a leaky Stoke defence. However Stoke were also scoring an equal number of goals themselves as Northampton Town were beaten 6–2 with Ritchie again scoring four goals. Stoke finished the season in a respectable position of 10th. At the end of the season both Jimmy McIlroy and Bill Asprey left the club after having a good careers at the Victoria Ground. The 1965–66 season also saw the introduction of the substitute, Stoke's first sub being Keith Bebbington.

Tony Waddington tried to sign Swedish international Sven-Gunnar Larsson early in the season and actually played him in a friendly against Dynamo Moscow, but permission was denied by the FA and Stoke were fined £100.

=== FA Cup ===
Stoke were drawn at home to Third Division side Walsall in the third round and were to shock Stoke with a 2–0 win. Bobby Irvine played in the match and a produced a woeful performance and his mistake cost Stoke the match and also his Stoke career as he never played for the club again.

=== League Cup ===
Stoke went out of this season's League Cup in the fourth round losing 2–1 away at Burnley after knocking out both Norwich City and Chesterfield.

== Final league table ==
Pos	Team	Pld	W	D	L	GF	GA	GAv	Pts	Qualification or relegation
8	Tottenham Hotspur	42	16	12	14	75	66	1.136	44	
9	Sheffield United	42	16	11	15	56	59	0.949	43	
10	Stoke City	42	15	12	15	65	64	1.016	42	
11	Everton	42	15	11	16	56	62	0.903	41	Qualification for the European Cup Winners' Cup first round (Note: Everton qualified for the European Cup Winners' Cup as the 1965–66 FA Cup winners.)
12	West Ham United	42	15	9	18	70	83	0.843	39	

Source: World Football
Rules for classification: 1) Points; 2) Goal average; 3) Goals scored

== Results ==
Stoke's score comes first

=== Legend ===
Win	Draw	Loss

=== Football League First Division ===
Match	Date	Opponent	Venue	Result	Attendance	Scorers
1	21 August 1965	Arsenal	A	1–2	30,100	Ritchie
2	25 August 1965	Chelsea	H	2–2	28,154	Viollet (2)
3	28 August 1965	Everton	H	1–1	30,014	Ritchie (pen)
4	1 September 1965	Chelsea	A	2–1	25,071	Viollet, Setters
5	4 September 1965	Manchester United	A	1–1	37,603	Dobing
6	8 September 1965	Blackburn Rovers	H	3–2	12,375	Vernon, Ritchie (pen), Newton (o.g.)
7	11 September 1965	Newcastle United	H	4–0	25,702	Vernon (2), Dobing, Bebbington
8	15 September 1965	Blackburn Rovers	A	1–0	9,565	Bebbington
9	18 September 1965	West Bromwich Albion	A	2–6	24,374	Vernon, Dobing
10	25 September 1965	Nottingham Forest	H	1–0	21,079	Setters
11	9 October 1965	Leicester City	H	1–0	24,025	Dobing
12	16 October 1965	Sheffield United	A	2–3	22,649	Dobing, Kinnell
13	23 October 1965	Leeds United	H	1–2	30,893	Viollet
14	30 October 1965	West Ham United	A	0–0	18,570	
15	6 November 1965	Sunderland	H	1–1	22,814	Kinnell
16	13 November 1965	Aston Villa	A	1–0	22,031	Burrows
17	20 November 1965	Liverpool	H	0–0	28,622	
18	27 November 1965	Tottenham Hotspur	A	2–2	25,552	Dobing, Vernon (pen)
19	4 December 1965	Fulham	H	3–2	14,871	Vernon, Setters, Bloor
20	11 December 1965	Blackpool	A	1–1	11,837	Burrows
21	27 December 1965	Burnley	H	3–1	35,923	Burrows (2), Vernon
22	28 December 1965	Burnley	A	1–4	23,216	Dobing
23	1 January 1966	Leicester City	A	0–1	26,067	
24	8 January 1966	Blackpool	H	4–1	20,276	Burrows, Dobing, Vernon, Bebbington
25	15 January 1966	Leeds United	A	2–2	34,802	Dobing, Palmer
26	29 January 1966	Arsenal	H	1–3	21,883	Ritchie (pen)
27	5 February 1966	Everton	A	1–2	24,999	Viollet
28	12 February 1966	Northampton Town	H	6–2	16,525	Vernon, Dobing, Ritchie (4)
29	19 February 1966	Manchester United	H	2–2	36,667	Vernon, Ritchie
30	26 February 1966	Newcastle United	A	1–3	26,192	Burrows
31	12 March 1966	West Bromwich Albion	H	1–1	23,261	Ritchie
32	19 March 1966	Nottingham Forest	A	3–4	21,175	Ritchie, Burrows, Dobing
33	25 March 1966	Sheffield United	H	2–0	17,101	Ritchie, Bloor
34	31 March 1966	Sheffield Wednesday	A	1–4	19,895	Viollet
35	2 April 1966	Sunderland	A	0–2	20,108	
36	9 April 1966	Aston Villa	H	2–0	15,186	Burrows (2)
37	12 April 1966	Northampton Town	A	0–1	20,680	
38	16 April 1966	Liverpool	A	0–2	41,106	
39	23 April 1966	Tottenham Hotspur	H	0–1	19,148	
40	30 April 1966	Fulham	A	1–1	25,491	Bridgwood
41	4 May 1966	Sheffield Wednesday	H	3–1	11,602	Ritchie, Palmer, Bernard
42	7 May 1966	West Ham United	H	1–0	15,670	Bridgwood

=== FA Cup ===
Round	Date	Opponent	Venue	Result	Attendance	Scorers
R3	22 January 1966	Walsall	H	0–2	32,676	

=== League Cup ===
Round	Date	Opponent	Venue	Result	Attendance	Scorers
R2	23 September 1965	Norwich City	H	2–1	12,896	Vernon, Burrows
R3	3 October 1965	Chesterfield	A	2–2	12,235	Burrows, Philpott
R3 Replay	20 October 1965	Chesterfield	H	2–1	12,595	Viollet, Dobing
R4	3 November 1965	Burnley	H	0–0	14,413	
R4 Replay	9 November 1965	Burnley	A	1–2 (aet)	13,466	Dobing

=== Friendlies ===
Match	Opponent	Venue	Result
1	Home Farm	A	2–1
2	Feyenoord	A	1–1
3	Ajax	A	3–5
4	Oxford United	A	2–5
5	Coventry City	A	1–5
6	Stockport County	A	6–4
7	Congleton Town	A	3–4
8	Southend United	A	3–2
9	Crewe Alexandra	A	4–2
10	Crystal Palace	A	0–4
11	Dynamo Moscow	H	0–2
12	Hong Kong League	A	7–0
13	Hong Kong XI	A	4–2

== Squad statistics ==
Pos.	Name	League		FA Cup		League Cup		Total	
Pos.	Name	Apps	Goals	Apps	Goals	Apps	Goals	Apps	Goals
GK	(England) John Farmer	17	0	0	0	0	0	17	0
GK	(Northern Ireland) Bobby Irvine	13	0	1	0	3	0	17	0
GK	(Scotland) Lawrie Leslie	12	0	0	0	2	0	14	0
DF	(England) Tony Allen	17	0	1	0	0	0	18	0
DF	(England) Bill Asprey	2	0	0	0	0	0	2	0
DF	(England) Bill Bentley	5	0	0	0	0	0	5	0
DF	(England) Mike Bernard	3	1	0	0	0	0	3	1
DF	(England) Alan Bloor	29(2)	2	1	0	4	0	34(2)	2
DF	(Scotland) George Kinnell	25(2)	2	0	0	4	0	29(2)	2
DF	(England) Eric Skeels	41	0	1	0	5	0	47	0
MF	(England) Gerry Bridgwood	14(1)	2	0	0	1	0	15(1)	2
MF	(England) John Flowers	3	0	0	0	0	0	3	0
MF	(England) Calvin Palmer	38	2	1	0	5	0	44	2
MF	(England) Alan Philpott	1(1)	0	0	0	1	1	2(1)	2
MF	(England) Maurice Setters	39	3	1	0	5	0	45	3
MF	(England) John Woodward	6	0	0	0	0	0	6	0
FW	(England) Keith Bebbington	21(1)	3	0	0	4	0	25(1)	3
FW	(England) Harry Burrows	36	9	1	0	5	2	42	11
FW	(England) Peter Dobing	37(1)	11	1	0	5	2	43(1)	13
FW	(England) Gerry Jones	2	0	0	0	0	0	2	0
FW	(Northern Ireland) Jimmy McIlroy	15(2)	0	0	0	2	0	17(2)	0
FW	(England) John Ritchie	23	13	1	0	0	0	24	13
FW	(Wales) Roy Vernon	31	10	1	0	4	1	36	11
FW	(England) Dennis Viollet	32	6	1	0	5	1	38	7
–	Own goals	–	1	–	0	–	0	–	1
