= Calvin Palmer =

English footballer (1940-2014)

Personal information
- Full name: Calvin Ian Palmer
- Date of birth: 21 October 1940
- Place of birth: Skegness, England
- Date of death: 12 March 2014 (aged 73)
- Place of death: Brighton, England
- Position: Midfielder

Youth career
- 1957: Skegness Town

Senior career*
Years	Team	Apps	(Gls)
1958–1963	Nottingham Forest	91	(14)
1963–1968	Stoke City	165	(24)
1968–1970	Sunderland	41	(5)
1970	Cape Town City		
1971	Hellenic		
1971–1972	Crewe Alexandra	2	(0)
1972	Hereford United		
1972	Durban United		
1973–1975	Berea Park		
Total		298	(43)
- * Club domestic league appearances and goals

Calvin Ian Palmer (21 October 1940 – 12 March 2014) was an English footballer who played in the Football League for Crewe Alexandra, Nottingham Forest, Sunderland and Stoke City.

Palmer began his career with Nottingham Forest making 101 appearances in six seasons at the City Ground before joining Stoke City in September 1963 for £30,000. He impressed for Stoke due to his high energy levels and was on the verge of gaining an international call up but he gained a reputation for off the field confrontations after a training ground 'bust up' with Maurice Setters. He was sold to Sunderland in February 1968 but did not get along with manager Alan Brown and left for South African football with Cape Town City, Hellenic, Durban United and Berea Park. In between his time in South Africa he turned out for Crewe Alexandra and Hereford United.

== Career ==
Palmer was born in Skegness and began playing non-league football with Skegness Town before being spotted by Nottingham Forest, signing in March 1958. He established himself in Andy Beattie's side as a tough tackling midfielder and made 90 league appearances for Forest, scoring 14 goals and playing in seven different positions. His performances for Forest earned him recognition as a reserve for the England under-23 side. On the lookout for new players as Stoke City suffered five successive defeats early in 1963–64, manager Tony Waddington was so impressed by Palmer's display he sought out Beattie after the match to broker a deal. Palmer cost Stoke £30,000 and was seen as a long-term replacement for the ageing Eddie Clamp. He was blessed with boundless energy and regularly ran back to make a tackle in his own penalty area before charging upfield again. He had a decent goal ratio for a midfielder averaging one every five games. In his first season with Stoke he played in the final of the League Cup, as Stoke lost to Leicester City after two legs.

He was also known for having a short fuse and at the end of the 1964–65 season with the squad preparing for a tour of the United States, Palmer was involved with a training ground altercation with Maurice Setters. Setters apologised to Waddington but Palmer did not and was made to remain in England. He returned to the side for the 1965–66 season and there was speculation that a call up to the England side would be forthcoming. Alas it never came and Palmer made few friends when he publicly criticised the Stoke crowd for showing a lack of support. He tabled a transfer request in December 1966 and, although it was granted, it took him 12 months to find a new club. In the meantime Palmer starred in a remarkable 4–3 win away at West Ham United in 1967–68, having been informed prior to kick-off that his family had been involved in a car crash. He filled in at centre back for the injured Alan Bloor and at half time Stoke were 3–0 down before coming back to claim an unlikely victory.

His legs began to go and in February 1968 he was sold to Sunderland for £70,000 and signed his Stoke career off by scoring the winning goal away at Southampton. His time at Roker Park was marked by friction with the management and despite being just 28 his reputation for confrontation counted against him and no other English club was willing to sign him. So he then moved to South Africa playing for Cape Town City and Hellenic before returning to help Dennis Viollet at Crewe Alexandra in 1971. He then played for non-league Hereford United and made a return to South Africa with Durban United and Berea Park.

After a long illness Palmer died on 12 March 2014 at a Brighton hospice, at the age of 73.

== Career statistics ==
Appearances and goals by club, season and competition
Club	Season	Division	League		FA Cup		League Cup		Total	
Club	Season	Division	Apps	Goals	Apps	Goals	Apps	Goals	Apps	Goals
Nottingham Forest	1958–59	First Division	2	0	0	0	0	0	2	0
Nottingham Forest	1959–60	First Division	4	1	0	0	0	0	4	1
Nottingham Forest	1960–61	First Division	27	2	1	0	2	0	30	2
Nottingham Forest	1961–62	First Division	30	2	2	0	2	0	34	2
Nottingham Forest	1962–63	First Division	25	8	2	0	0	0	27	8
Nottingham Forest	1963–64	First Division	3	1	0	0	0	0	3	1
Nottingham Forest	Total		91	14	5	0	5	0	101	14
Stoke City	1963–64	First Division	30	5	5	0	5	0	40	5
Stoke City	1964–65	First Division	36	8	3	0	3	1	42	9
Stoke City	1965–66	First Division	38	2	1	0	5	0	44	2
Stoke City	1966–67	First Division	38	5	1	0	1	0	40	5
Stoke City	1967–68	First Division	23	4	2	0	5	2	30	6
Stoke City	Total		165	24	12	0	19	3	196	27
Sunderland	1967–68	First Division	7	1	0	0	0	0	7	1
Sunderland	1968–69	First Division	28	4	0	0	1	0	29	4
Sunderland	1969–70	First Division	6	0	0	0	1	0	7	0
Sunderland	Total		41	5	0	0	2	0	43	5
Crewe Alexandra	1971–72	Fourth Division	2	0	1	0	0	0	3	0
Career total			299	43	18	0	26	3	343	46

== Honours ==
Stoke City

- Football League Cup runner-up: 1963–64
