= Bertie Shardlow =

English cricketer

Personal information
- Full name: Bertie Shardlow
- Born: 15 December 1909; Stone, Staffordshire, England
- Died: 30 April 1976 (aged 66); Stoke-on-Trent, Staffordshire, England
- Batting: Left-handed
- Bowling: Slow left-arm orthodox
- Relatives: Paul Shardlow (son)

Domestic team information
- Years: Team
- 1949–1950: Minor Counties
- 1936–1957: Staffordshire

Career statistics
| Competition | First-class |
|---|---|
| Matches | 2 |
| Runs scored | 45 |
| Batting average | 15.00 |
| 100s/50s | –/– |
| Top score | 24* |
| Balls bowled | 300 |
| Wickets | 6 |
| Bowling average | 14.83 |
| 5 wickets in innings | 1 |
| 10 wickets in match | – |
| Best bowling | 5/25 |
| Catches/stumpings | 3/– |
- Source: Cricinfo, 6 May 2012

Bertie Shardlow (15 December 1909 – 30 April 1976) was an English cricketer. Shardlow was a left-handed batsman who bowled slow left-arm orthodox. He was born at Stone, Staffordshire.

Shardlow made his debut in county cricket for Staffordshire in the 1936 Minor Counties Championship against the Lancashire Second XI. Before the start of World War II in 1939, Shardlow made 24 appearances for the county in the Minor Counties Championship. Following World War II, he made a further 115 appearances for Staffordshire in Minor Counties Championship, with his final match coming against Durham in 1957. In his career with Staffordshire, he took 558 wickets. It was the opinion of Sydney Barnes that if Shardlow had accepted several offers he received to qualify for a first-class county, he may well have possessed enough quality to play at Test level for England.

It was also after the war that he made his debut in first-class cricket for a combined Minor Counties team against Yorkshire at Lord's. Yorkshire batted first and made 231 all out, during which Shardlow bowled three wicketless overs. Responding in their first-innings, the Minor Counties made 210 all out, with Shardlow ending the innings not out on 24. In Yorkshire's second-innings of 250 all out, he took a single wicket, that of Norman Yardley, to finish with figures of 1/20 from twelve overs. Chasing 272 to win, the Minor Counties could only manage 135 all out in their second-innings, with Shardlow being dismissed for 5 runs by Allan Mason. Yorkshire's margin of victory was 136 runs. The following season he made a second first-class appearance for the Minor Counties against the Marylebone Cricket Club at Lord's. Batting first, the Marylebone Cricket Club were dismissed for 127, with Shardlow leading the way with five wickets, taking figures of 5/25 from twenty overs. The Minor Counties responded in their first-innings by making 172 all out, with Shardlow making 16 runs before he was dismissed by Fred Titmus. He went wicketless in the Marylebone Cricket Club second-innings of 229 all out, which left the Minor Counties with a target of 185 for victory. They fell short in their chase, making just 129, with Shardlow being dismissed for a duck during the innings by Francis Appleyard. The Marylebone Cricket Club won the match by 55 runs.

Away from cricket he worked as a boat carpenter. He died in hospital at Stoke-on-Trent, Staffordshire, following a long illness on 30 April 1976. His son, Paul, also played Minor counties cricket for Staffordshire. He was also a professional footballer, playing for Northwich Victoria and Stoke City.
