= Mike Bernard (footballer) =

English footballer (born 1948)

Personal information
- Full name: Michael Peter Bernard
- Date of birth: 10 January 1948 (age 78)
- Place of birth: Shrewsbury, England
- Position: Midfielder

Youth career
- 1963–1964: Shrewsbury Town

Senior career*
Years	Team	Apps	(Gls)
1965–1972	Stoke City	136	(6)
1967	→ Cleveland Stokers (loan)	5	(1)
1972–1977	Everton	147	(8)
1977–1979	Oldham Athletic	6	(0)
Total		294	(15)

International career
1970	England U-23	3	(0)
- * Club domestic league appearances and goals

Michael Peter Bernard (born 10 January 1948) is an English former footballer who played in the Football League for Everton, Oldham Athletic and Stoke City.

== Career ==
Bernard started his career in the youth ranks at his local team Shrewsbury Town before joining Stoke City in 1965 after impressing in a youth team match between the two sides. He made his debut during the 1965–66 season and became a regular in Tony Waddington's first team by 1967–68. He became useful player who was able to play at full back and in midfield and was a member of Stoke's 1972 League Cup winning squad. Bernard then became the first member of the squad to leave as after making 178 appearances he was sold to Everton in April 1972 for a then club record £140,000.

Bernard spent five seasons at Goodison Park earning a League Cup runner-up medal in 1977. After making 171 appearances for the "Toffees" he left for Oldham Athletic, but had to end his career after a serious calf injury.

== After retirement ==
Bernard later ran a pub in Chester and also spent time working on the commercial side at Crewe Alexandra and later at Stoke for a short period. He then moved to live in Portugal.

== Career statistics ==
Appearances and goals by club, season and competition
Club	Season	League			FA Cup		League Cup		Other		Total	
Club	Season	Division	Apps	Goals	Apps	Goals	Apps	Goals	Apps	Goals	Apps	Goals
Stoke City	1965–66	First Division	3	1	0	0	0	0	—		3	1
Stoke City	1966–67	First Division	5	0	0	0	0	0	—		5	0
Stoke City	1967–68	First Division	17	0	0	0	2	0	—		19	0
Stoke City	1968–69	First Division	24	0	4	0	0	0	—		28	0
Stoke City	1969–70	First Division	11	1	0	0	0	0	—		11	1
Stoke City	1970–71	First Division	40	2	10	1	1	0	4 (Note: Two appearances in Anglo-Italian Cup and two in Texaco Cup)	0	55	3
Stoke City	1971–72	First Division	36	2	8	1	12	2	4 (Note: Appearances in Texaco Cup)	1	60	6
Stoke City	Total		136	6	22	2	15	2	8	1	181	11
Cleveland Stokers (loan)	1967	United Soccer Association	5	1	—		—		—		5	1
Everton	1972–73	First Division	32	1	2	0	1	0	—		35	1
Everton	1973–74	First Division	37	4	3	0	2	0	1	0	43	4
Everton	1974–75	First Division	33	0	3	0	2	0	—		38	0
Everton	1975–76	First Division	30	2	1	0	3	0	2 (Note: Appearances in UEFA Cup)	0	36	2
Everton	1976–77	First Division	15	1	1	0	4	0	—		20	1
Everton	Total		147	8	10	0	12	0	3	0	172	8
Oldham Athletic	1977–78	Second Division	4	0	0	0	1	0	—		5	0
Oldham Athletic	1978–79	Second Division	2	0	0	0	0	0	—		2	0
Oldham Athletic	Total		6	0	0	0	1	0	0	0	7	0
Career Total			294	15	32	2	28	2	11	1	365	20

== Honours ==
Stoke City

- Football League Cup: 1971–72

Everton

- Football League Cup runner-up: 1976–77
