= Harry Burrows =

English footballer (1941–2026)

- Burrows in 2024

Personal information
- Full name: Henry Burrows
- Date of birth: 17 March 1941
- Place of birth: Haydock, England
- Date of death: 8 September 2026 (aged 85)
- Position: Forward

Youth career
- Wigan Boys
- 1956–1958: Aston Villa

Senior career*
Years	Team	Apps	(Gls)
1958–1965	Aston Villa	147	(53)
1965–1973	Stoke City	245	(68)
1967	→ Cleveland Stokers (loan)	9	(3)
1973–1975	Plymouth Argyle	19	(3)
Total		420	(127)

International career
1962	England U23	1	(0)
- * Club domestic league appearances and goals

Henry Burrows (17 March 1941 – 8 September 2026) was an English professional footballer who played as a forward in the Football League for Aston Villa, Plymouth Argyle and Stoke City.

== Career ==
Burrows was born in Haydock in St Helens, Lancashire on 17 March 1941. He attracted the attentions of First Division clubs, Burnley, Liverpool, and Aston Villa whilst playing for Wigan Boys. Burrows turned them all down including an offer from Stan Cullis at Wolverhampton Wanderers instead turning his attentions on becoming an apprentice with the National Coal Board (NCB) at Haydock colliery.

Villa manager Joe Mercer persuaded Burrows to sign part-time in March 1958 and he made his debut in 1959–60 as Villa won the Second Division title. He played and scored in the final of the inaugural League Cup in 1961 as Villa beat Rotherham United 3–2. Burrows won an England U23 cap against Greece and finished as Villa's top goalscorer in 1961–62 and 1962–63, although the departure of Mercer ended a golden period in Villa's history. The signings of new manager Dick Taylor all earned a higher basic wage then the existing Villa players which caused friction and one by one the players departed and Villa would end up languishing in the Third Division.

He was a highly prized asset at Villa Park and his transfer to Stoke City for £27,000 on transfer deadline day in March 1965 was seen as a coup for Tony Waddington. His infamous 'cannonball' like shot soon made him a terrace favourite at the Victoria Ground. He scored 17 goals in 1966–67 as Stoke let a good start to the season come to nothing and they finished in 12th place. He was joint top league goalscorer in 1967–68 with 15 goals as Stoke finished 18th. He top scored again in 1969–70 with 14 and played 45 games in 1970–71 as Stoke lost out to Arsenal in the FA Cup semi-final. Injuries led to Burrows being released on a free transfer in the summer of 1973 and signed for Plymouth Argyle. He helped Argyle gain promotion to the Second Division in 1974–75 but with his knee still causing him trouble he decided to retire.

== Style of play ==
Burrows could play in all forward positions but was most regularly played as an out and out winger. He was renowned for his pace and powerful left foot shot.

== Retirement and death ==
On his retirement Burrows returned to Staffordshire and ran a haberdashery business, a pub and a post office and occasionally turned out in charity matches. He lived for a number of years in the Staffordshire village of Abbots Bromley, where he was the president of the local football club, the Abbots Bromley Stags.

Burrows died on 8 September 2026, aged 85. His death was met with tributes from Aston Villa and Stoke City.

== Career statistics ==
Appearances and goals by club, season and competition
Club	Season	League			FA Cup		League Cup		Other		Total	
Club	Season	Division	Apps	Goals	Apps	Goals	Apps	Goals	Apps	Goals	Apps	Goals
Aston Villa	1959–60	Second Division	1	0	0	0	—		—		1	0
Aston Villa	1960–61	First Division	11	2	0	0	6	3	—		17	5
Aston Villa	1961–62	First Division	34	13	4	3	3	4	—		42	20
Aston Villa	1962–63	First Division	39	16	3	2	8	4	—		50	22
Aston Villa	1963–64	First Division	40	16	2	0	1	1	—		43	17
Aston Villa	1964–65	First Division	22	6	2	0	5	3	—		29	9
Aston Villa	Total		147	53	11	5	23	15	0	0	181	79
Stoke City	1964–65	First Division	10	3	0	0	0	0	—		10	3
Stoke City	1965–66	First Division	36	9	1	0	5	2	—		42	11
Stoke City	1966–67	First Division	42	17	1	0	1	0	—		44	17
Stoke City	1967–68	First Division	42	15	2	0	5	1	—		49	16
Stoke City	1968–69	First Division	35	4	4	4	0	0	—		39	8
Stoke City	1969–70	First Division	34	14	3	0	1	0	—		38	14
Stoke City	1970–71	First Division	34	5	8	1	1	0	2 (Note: Appearances in Texaco Cup)	1	45	7
Stoke City	1971–72	First Division	10	1	2	0	0	0	4 (Note: Appearances in Anglo-Italian Cup)	0	16	1
Stoke City	1972–73	First Division	2	0	0	0	0	0	0	0	2	0
Stoke City	Total		245	68	21	5	13	3	6	1	285	77
Cleveland Stokers (loan)	1967	United Soccer Association	9	3	—		—		—		9	3
Plymouth Argyle	1973–74	Third Division	9	2	0	0	1	0	—		10	2
Plymouth Argyle	1974–75	Third Division	10	1	0	0	2	0	—		12	1
Plymouth Argyle	Total		19	3	0	0	3	0	—		22	3
Career total			420	127	32	10	39	18	6	1	497	156

== Honours ==
Aston Villa

- Football League Second Division: 1959–60
- Football League Cup: 1960–61; runner-up: 1962–63
