= Sam McMillan =

Sam McMillan may refer to:

- Sam Mac, Australian radio presenter
- Sammy J (born 1983), Australian comedian
- Sammy McMillan, association football player (Manchester United, Wrexham, Northern Ireland)
