= Alan Philpott =

English footballer (1942–2009)

Personal information
- Full name: Alan Philpott
- Date of birth: 8 November 1942
- Place of birth: Stoke-on-Trent, England
- Date of death: 26 May 2009 (aged 66)
- Place of death: Fenton, Staffordshire, England
- Position: Midfielder

Senior career*
Years	Team	Apps	(Gls)
1960–1968	Stoke City	45	(1)
1968–1970	Oldham Athletic	31	(1)
- Stafford Rangers
- Eastwood Hanley
Total		76	(2)
- * Club domestic league appearances and goals

Alan Philpott (8 November 1942 – 26 May 2009) was an English footballer who played in the Football League for Oldham Athletic and Stoke City.

== Career ==
Philpott was born in Stoke-on-Trent and joined Stoke City's youth ranks in 1960. He made his debut for the "Potters" on the final day of the 1960–61 season against Liverpool at the Victoria Ground. He was a regular in the reserves and in the first-team he played twice in 1961–62 and once in 1962–63, but failed to make an appearance in 1963–64. He showed useful versatility in 1964–65 where he played 17 games in a number of positions, scoring once against Nottingham Forest. Philpott made three appearances in 1965–66, scoring in a League Cup match against Chesterfield.

He broke into the first team in 1966–67, making 27 appearances but found himself back in the reserves in 1967–68 and was sold to Oldham Athletic by Tony Waddington. He joined up with some former Stoke players at Boundary Park including manager Jimmy McIlroy. Over two seasons, he made 33 appearances, scoring once in his second-to-last game against Barrow. He returned to Staffordshire and played non-League football for Stafford Rangers and Eastwood Hanley before having a spell as youth coach at Port Vale. He later became a cricket umpire in North Staffordshire and was umpiring a game when he suffered a fatal heart attack on 26 May 2009.

== Career statistics ==
Appearances and goals by club, season and competition
Club	Season	League			FA Cup		League Cup		Total	
Club	Season	Division	Apps	Goals	Apps	Goals	Apps	Goals	Apps	Goals
Stoke City	1960–61	Second Division	1	0	0	0	0	0	1	0
Stoke City	1961–62	Second Division	2	0	0	0	0	0	2	0
Stoke City	1962–63	Second Division	1	0	0	0	0	0	1	0
Stoke City	1963–64	First Division	0	0	0	0	0	0	0	0
Stoke City	1964–65	First Division	12	1	0	0	4	0	16	1
Stoke City	1965–66	First Division	2	0	0	0	1	1	3	1
Stoke City	1966–67	First Division	26	0	1	0	0	0	27	0
Stoke City	1967–68	First Division	1	0	0	0	1	0	2	0
Stoke City	Total		45	1	1	0	6	1	52	2
Oldham Athletic	1967–68	Third Division	20	0	1	0	0	0	21	0
Oldham Athletic	1968–69	Third Division	11	1	0	0	2	0	13	1
Oldham Athletic	Total		31	1	1	0	2	0	34	1
Career total			76	2	2	0	8	1	86	3
