= Bobby Irvine (footballer, born 1942) =

Northern Irish footballer (1942–2026)

Personal information
- Full name: Robert James Irvine
- Date of birth: 17 January 1942
- Place of birth: Carrickfergus, Northern Ireland
- Date of death: 30 June 2026 (aged 84)
- Position: Goalkeeper

Senior career*
Years	Team	Apps	(Gls)
- Carrick Technical School
1957–1963	Linfield		
1963–1966	Stoke City	25	(0)
1966–1967	Altrincham		
1967–1974	Wellington Town/Telford United		

International career
1962–1965	Northern Ireland	8	(0)
- * Club domestic league appearances and goals

Robert James Irvine (17 January 1942 – 30 June 2026) was a Northern Irish footballer who played as a goalkeeper in the Football League for Stoke City. His younger brother Willie was a forward for Burnley in the sixties.

== Club career ==
=== Linfield ===
Irvine signed for Linfield as a teenager in 1957 from Carrick Tech and established himself in the first team at Windsor Park when at 16. In the fifties, he featured in some of the south Belfast club's earliest European Cup games. Irvine found disfavour with the Linfield selection committee during the 1960–61 season and at one stage it seemed he would be released.

=== Stoke City ===
In June 1963 Irvine transferred to Stoke City for £6,000 and made his debut in the opening game of the season, a 2–1 defeat of Spurs. He lost his place after seven games, however, to Lawrie Leslie and remained out of the side for most of the season. Irvine did pick up a League Cup runners-up medal at the end of his first season. He was largely out of favour in 1964–65, making just one league appearance but returned to the first team the following year. Irvine was given the honour of captaining Stoke in a League Cup tie against Burnley, who were captained in that game by his brother Willie. The idea of them both captaining their sides came from Clarets' manager Harry Potts. The brothers met in the centre circle to shake hands and toss the coin and then played against each other for the first time since schooldays. Irvine's career at the Victoria Ground was brought to an end after an FA Cup third-round game against Walsall. He gave away a penalty that helped the Third Division side to a 2–0 win. Furious with Irvine's antics, manager Tony Waddington never picked him again.

== International career ==
Irvine was capped at both schoolboy and Under 23 level for Northern Ireland before making his senior debut against the Netherlands in Rotterdam in 1962. He was brought in to replace Harry Gregg and would keep his place for the next six international matches. Irvine made his eighth and final international appearance in 1965 against Wales.

== Career statistics ==
=== Club ===
Appearances and goals by club, season and competition
Club	Season	League			FA Cup		League Cup		Total	
Club	Season	Division	Apps	Goals	Apps	Goals	Apps	Goals	Apps	Goals
Stoke City	1963–64	First Division	11	0	0	0	1	0	12	0
Stoke City	1964–65	First Division	1	0	0	0	1	0	2	0
Stoke City	1965–66	First Division	13	0	1	0	3	0	17	0
Career total			25	0	1	0	5	0	31	0

=== International ===
Appearances and goals by national team and year
National team	Year	Apps	Goals
Northern Ireland	1962	5	0
Northern Ireland	1963	2	0
Northern Ireland	1965	1	0
Total		8	0

== Death ==
Irvine died 30 June 2026, aged 84. A statement from Linfield Football Club on 1 July read: "We are deeply saddened to learn of the passing of former goalkeeper Bobby Irvine, who passed away last night."

== Honours ==
Stoke City

- Football League Cup runner-up: 1963–64
