= Roy Vernon =

Welsh footballer (1937–1993)

Personal information
- Full name: Thomas Royston Vernon
- Date of birth: 14 April 1937
- Place of birth: Ffynnongroew, Wales
- Date of death: 4 December 1993 (aged 56)
- Position: Forward

Senior career*
Years	Team	Apps	(Gls)
1955–1960	Blackburn Rovers	131	(49)
1960–1965	Everton	176	(101)
1965–1970	Stoke City	84	(22)
1967	→ Cleveland Stokers (guest)	11	(2)
1970	→ Halifax Town (loan)	4	(0)
1970	Cape Town City		
1970–1972	Great Harwood		
1972	Hellenic		
Total		406	(174)

International career
1957–1968	Wales	32	(8)
- * Club domestic league appearances and goals

Thomas Royston Vernon (14 April 1937 – 4 December 1993) was a Welsh professional footballer who played as a forward for Blackburn Rovers, Everton and Stoke City. Vernon won 32 caps for Wales, scoring eight goals in total, and representing his country in the 1958 World Cup in Sweden.

== Club career ==
Vernon was born in Ffynnongroew, Flintshire and attended Glyndŵr School in Rhyl. He made his debut for Blackburn Rovers at the age of 18. He soon became a regular under Johnny Carey and Ewood Park and scored 15 goals in 44 games in 1957–58 as Rovers won promotion to the First Division. He took to the top flight with ease scoring 17 goals in 1958–59 as Blackburn finished in 10th position.

After an argument with Blackburn manager Dally Duncan, Vernon signed for Everton in 1960 for £27,000 plus winger Eddie Thomas. He became a prolific goalscorer for the "Toffees" after scoring nine goals in his first 12 matches in 1959–60 he then scored 22 in 1960–61, a career best of 28 in 1961–62 and was the top scorer with 24 goals and captain when Everton won the First Division title in the 1962–63 season. His striking partner who scored 22 goals in that title winning year was 'the golden vision' Alex Young.

Vernon was a lean player with an aquiline nose, a powerful left foot shot, great skill and a coolness when taking his chances. Brian Labone said of him: "Taffy Vernon was about 10 stone. Wet through he looked about as athletic as Pinocchio." Apart from his success in open play, Roy Vernon was probably the finest and most successful penalty-taker ever to play for Everton. He made 200 appearances for Everton scoring 111 goals.

After Everton manager Harry Catterick became 'fed up' with Vernon's off field antics he sold Vernon to Stoke City for £40,000. He made a good start to his career under Tony Waddington scoring five goals in his first ten matches for the "Potters" at the end of the 1964–65 season. He scored 11 in 36 appearances in 1965–66 but a string of injuries reduced his effectiveness and after spending a short time out on loan at Halifax Town he moved to South Africa to play for Cape Town City and later Hellenic.

Vernon was a heavy smoker, often smoking in the tunnel before the game and immediately after, and was reputed to bet on the horses and the greyhounds in his spare time. He died in 1993 from cancer.

== International career ==
Vernon represented Wales at senior and amateur level.

== Career statistics ==
=== Club ===
Appearances and goals by club, season and competition
Club	Season	League			FA Cup		League Cup		Other		Total	
Club	Season	Division	Apps	Goals	Apps	Goals	Apps	Goals	Apps	Goals	Apps	Goals
Blackburn Rovers	1955–56	Second Division	12	1	1	0	—		0	0	13	1
Blackburn Rovers	1956–57	Second Division	31	11	1	0	—		0	0	32	11
Blackburn Rovers	1957–58	Second Division	37	15	6	0	—		0	0	44	15
Blackburn Rovers	1958–59	First Division	36	16	2	1	—		0	0	38	17
Blackburn Rovers	1959–60	First Division	15	6	3	2	—		0	0	18	8
Blackburn Rovers	Total		131	49	13	3	—		0	0	144	52
Everton	1959–60	First Division	12	9	0	0	—		0	0	12	9
Everton	1960–61	First Division	39	21	1	0	4	1	0	0	44	22
Everton	1961–62	First Division	37	26	3	2	0	0	0	0	40	28
Everton	1962–63	First Division	41	24	3	3	0	0	3	0	47	27
Everton	1963–64	First Division	31	18	5	2	3	1	0	0	49	21
Everton	1964–65	First Division	16	3	0	0	4	1	0	0	20	4
Everton	Total		176	101	12	7	11	3	3	0	202	111
Stoke City	1964–65	First Division	10	5	0	0	0	0	0	0	10	5
Stoke City	1965–66	First Division	31	10	1	0	4	1	0	0	36	11
Stoke City	1966–67	First Division	20	4	1	0	0	0	0	0	21	4
Stoke City	1967–68	First Division	19	2	2	1	0	2	0	0	23	3
Stoke City	1968–69	First Division	8	1	0	0	0	2	0	0	10	1
Stoke City	Total		88	22	4	1	8	1	0	0	100	24
Cleveland Stokers (loan)	1967	United Soccer Association	11	2	—		—		—		11	2
Halifax Town (loan)	1969–70	Third Division	4	0	0	0	0	0	0	0	4	0
Career total			410	174	29	11	19	4	3	0	461	189

=== International ===
Appearances and goals by national team and year
National team	Year	Apps	Goals
Wales	1957	7	1
Wales	1958	2	0
Wales	1960	4	1
Wales	1962	7	0
Wales	1963	2	0
Wales	1965	7	6
Wales	1966	1	0
Wales	1967	2	0
Total		32	8

== Honours ==
Blackburn Rovers

- Football League Second Division runner-up: 1957–58
- FA Cup runner-up: 1960

Everton

- Football League First Division: 1962–63
- FA Charity Shield: 1963
