= Maurice Setters =

English footballer and manager (1936–2020)

Personal information
- Full name: Maurice Edgar Setters
- Date of birth: 16 December 1936
- Place of birth: Honiton, Devon, England
- Date of death: 22 November 2020 (aged 83)
- Place of death: Doncaster, South Yorkshire, England
- Position: Wing half

Youth career
- 1952–1954: Exeter City

Senior career*
Years	Team	Apps	(Gls)
1954–1955	Exeter City	10	(0)
1955–1960	West Bromwich Albion	120	(10)
1960–1965	Manchester United	159	(12)
1965–1967	Stoke City	86	(5)
1967	→ Cleveland Stokers (guest)	9	(3)
1967–1970	Coventry City	51	(3)
1970	Charlton Athletic	8	(1)
Total		434	(31)

Managerial career
- 1971–1974: Doncaster Rovers
- 1983: Rotherham United (assistant)
- 1983: Sheffield Wednesday (caretaker)
- 1986–1995: Republic of Ireland (assistant)
- * Club domestic league appearances and goals

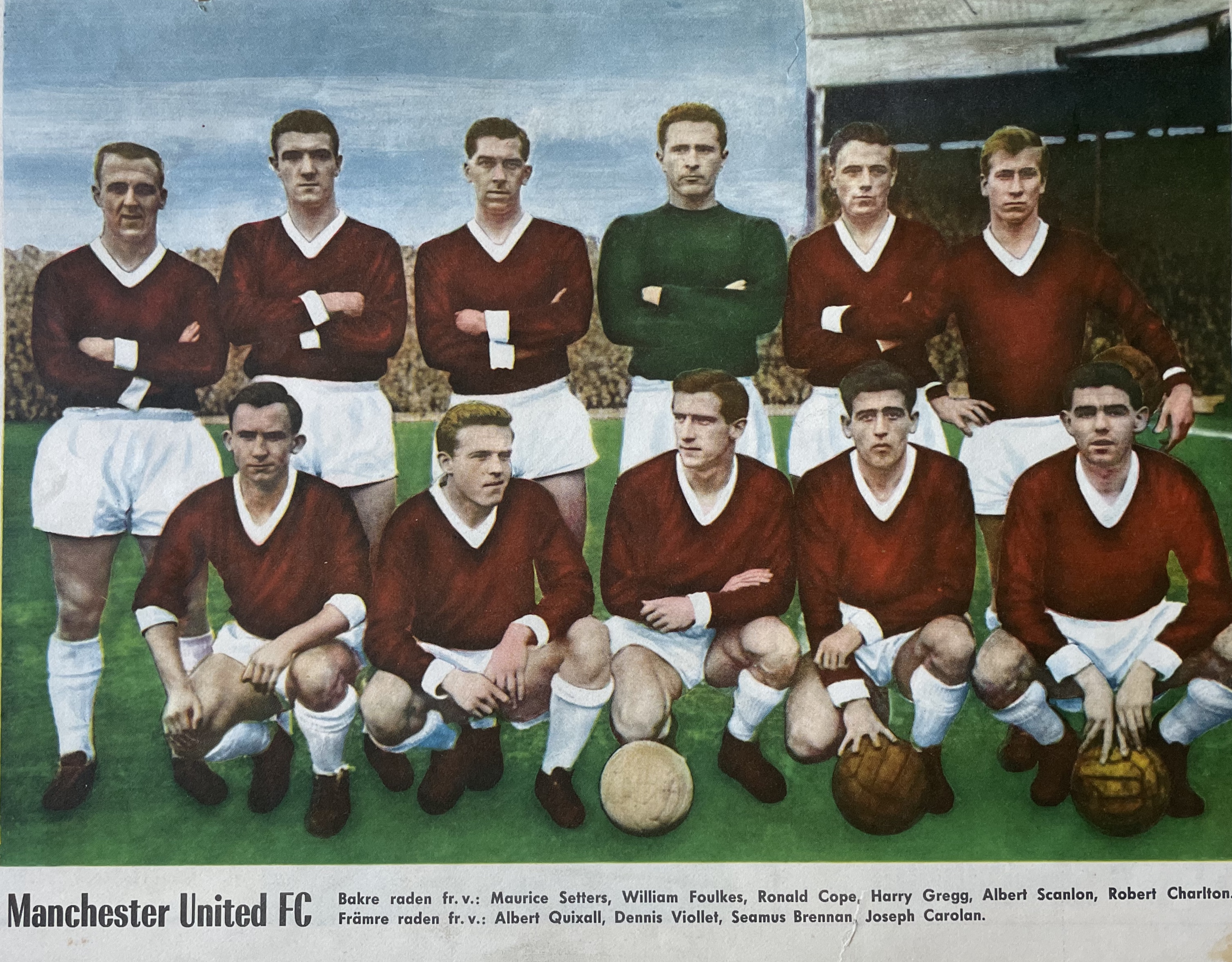
Manchester United F.C. in 1960 – from the left, standing: Maurice Setters, Bill Foulkes, Ronnie Cope, Harry Gregg, Albert Scanlon, Bobby Charlton. Front row: Warren Bradley, Albert Quixall, Dennis Viollet, Shay Brennan and Joe Carolan.

Maurice Edgar Setters (16 December 1936 – 22 November 2020) was an English football player and manager. As a player, he made more than 400 appearances in the Football League for Exeter City, West Bromwich Albion, Manchester United, Stoke City, Coventry City and Charlton Athletic, and in the United Soccer Association with the Cleveland Stokers (Stoke City under another name). Setters played in the left wing half position. As manager, he took charge of Doncaster Rovers and (briefly) Sheffield Wednesday, and spent several years as assistant manager of the Republic of Ireland.

Setters died on 22 November 2020 at the Doncaster Royal Infirmary, aged 83.

== Playing career ==
Setters started his career with Exeter City reserves, making his first-team debut against Southend United in March 1954, his only appearance for the "Grecians" in the 1953–54 season. He played a further nine games for Exeter in the 1954–55 season. First Division team West Bromwich Albion showed interest in acquiring Setters. Exeter were reluctant to let him go but the £3,000 transfer fee was sufficient at a time of financial problems for the club. Setters went on to play 120 games for West Brom.

In January 1960, he was transferred to Manchester United for a fee of £30,000. Matt Busby signed Setters as a replacement for the injured Wilf McGuinness who had suffered a career ending leg break. Setters developed his reputation for being one of footballs 'hard men' and his combative style made him a key part of the team. A poor 1962–63 league campaign saw Manchester United nearly relegated in the Second Division but they did beat Leicester City 3–1 in the 1963 FA Cup Final. A much improved 1963–64 season brought a 2nd-place finish behind Liverpool. A 7–0 win over Aston Villa early in the 1964–65 season was Setters 159th and final game for Manchester United as he was sold to Stoke City for £30,000.

He played 19 times for Stoke in 1964–65 as Stoke claimed a mid-table finish of 11th position. At the end of the campaign, with the squad training for their pre-season in the United States, Setters was involved in a 'bust-up' with teammate Calvin Palmer. Setters apologised to manager Tony Waddington and was allowed to travel to the United States but Palmer did not apologise and was forced to stay in England. Out in America, Setters played nine times for the Cleveland Stokers scoring three goals. He missed just three matches in 1965–66 playing in 45 fixtures. His run in the first team continued in 1966–67 until he sustained injury against Liverpool on 4 March 1967 which allowed Alan Bloor to take his place. After failing to dislodge Bloor, Setters joined Coventry City in November 1967 for a £25,000 fee. During this time he played nine games as a guest player with the Cleveland Stokers in the North American United Soccer Association. Setters made 59 appearances for Coventry in just under three years at Highfield Road and ended his career with a four-month spell with Second Division Charlton Athletic from January 1970, playing in eight games.

=== International career ===
Setters played for England School Boys and the England Youth teams. He made 16 appearances for the under-23 team.

Setters was included in the provisional England squad for the 1958 FIFA World Cup squad but was not selected for the main team.

== Managerial career ==
Setters was appointed manager of Doncaster Rovers in May 1971 and remained until November 1974 when he was dismissed. Setters later won a case for unfair dismissal. He had a short break from football before becoming Jack Charlton's assistant at Sheffield Wednesday in 1977. When Charlton resigned on 27 May 1983, Setters stayed on as caretaker manager for four weeks, although the club played no matches during this period. Setters became assistant manager and coach at Rotherham United in 1983 and in 1984 was chief scout at Newcastle United.

Setters later linked up with Jack Charlton again from 1986 to 1995 as assistant manager with the Republic of Ireland senior squad. He was also Sir Bobby Charlton's best man at his wedding in 1961.

== Later life ==
When Charlton resigned as Ireland manager in 1995 the Football Association of Ireland (FAI) assumed Setters would follow him. However he continued to turn up to work as assistant manager of the national team and manager of the under-21 team. Setters was sacked but initiated a claim for unfair dismissal. Charlton appeared at the tribunal to support Setters and the FAI eventually settled the claim.

Setters had Alzheimer's disease from around 2016 and from 2018 was in a residential care home. He became ill in mid-November 2020 and died at Doncaster Royal Infirmary on 22 November, aged 83.

== Career statistics ==
=== Playing career ===
Appearances and goals by club, season and competition
Club	Season	League			FA Cup		League Cup		Europe		Other^{[A]}		Total	
Club	Season	Division	Apps	Goals	Apps	Goals	Apps	Goals	Apps	Goals	Apps	Goals	Apps	Goals
Exeter City	1953–54	Third Division South	1	0	0	0	–		0	0	0	0	1	0
Exeter City	1954–55	Third Division South	9	0	1	0	–		0	0	0	0	10	0
Exeter City	Total		10	0	1	0	–		0	0	0	0	11	0
West Bromwich Albion	1955–56	First Division	11	2	3	0	–		0	0	0	0	14	2
West Bromwich Albion	1956–57	First Division	21	1	3	0	–		0	0	0	0	24	1
West Bromwich Albion	1957–58	First Division	27	3	3	0	–		0	0	0	0	30	3
West Bromwich Albion	1958–59	First Division	41	2	3	0	–		0	0	0	0	43	2
West Bromwich Albion	1959–60	First Division	20	2	0	0	–		0	0	0	0	20	2
West Bromwich Albion	Total		120	10	12	0	–		0	0	0	0	132	10
Manchester United	1959–60	First Division	17	0	2	0	0	0	0	0	0	0	19	0
Manchester United	1960–61	First Division	40	4	3	0	2	0	0	0	0	0	45	4
Manchester United	1961–62	First Division	38	3	7	1	0	0	0	0	0	0	45	4
Manchester United	1962–63	First Division	27	1	6	0	0	0	0	0	0	0	33	1
Manchester United	1963–64	First Division	32	4	7	0	0	0	4	1	1	0	44	5
Manchester United	1964–65	First Division	5	0	0	0	0	0	1	0	0	0	6	0
Manchester United	Total		159	12	25	1	2	0	5	1	1	0	192	14
Stoke City	1964–65	First Division	16	1	3	0	0	0	0	0	0	0	19	1
Stoke City	1965–66	First Division	39	3	1	0	5	0	0	0	0	0	45	3
Stoke City	1966–67	First Division	28	1	1	0	1	0	0	0	0	0	30	1
Stoke City	1967–68	First Division	3	0	0	0	0	0	0	0	0	0	3	0
Stoke City	Total		86	5	5	0	6	0	0	0	0	0	97	5
Cleveland Stokers (loan)	1967	United Soccer Association	9	3	—		—		—		—		9	3
Coventry City	1967–68	First Division	25	1	2	0	0	0	0	0	0	0	27	1
Coventry City	1968–69	First Division	17	2	0	0	4	0	0	0	0	0	21	2
Coventry City	1969–70	First Division	9	0	2	0	0	0	0	0	0	0	11	0
Coventry City	Total		51	3	4	0	4	0	0	0	0	0	59	3
Charlton Athletic	1969–70	Second Division	8	1	0	0	0	0	0	0	0	0	8	1
Career total			443	34	47	1	12	0	5	1	1	0	508	36

A. The "Other" column constitutes appearances and goals in the FA Charity Shield.

=== Managerial career ===
Team	From	To	Record				
Team	From	To	G	W	D	L	Win %
Doncaster Rovers	1 May 1971	15 November 1974	158	47	42	69	29.75

== Honours ==
Manchester United

- FA Cup: 1962–63
