= 1964–65 Stoke City F.C. season =

Stoke City
1964–65 season
- Chairman: Mr G. Taylor
- Manager: Tony Waddington
- Stadium: Victoria Ground
- Football League First Division: 11th (42 Points)
- FA Cup: Fourth Round
- League Cup: Fourth Round
- Top goalscorer: League: John Ritchie (25); All: John Ritchie (29)
- Highest home attendance: 43,431 vs Everton (22 August 1964)
- Lowest home attendance: 12,899 vs Birmingham City (17 March 1965)
- Average home league attendance: 25,787
Home colours

The 1964–65 season was Stoke City's 58th season in the Football League and the 34th in the First Division.

Stoke's main aim for the 1964–65 season was to consolidate themselves in the First Division and despite having not the greatest run of results Stoke finished in a comfortable position of 11th. Stanley Matthews called time on his long and famous career on 6 February 1965 against Fulham at the age of 50 and 5 days.

== Season review ==
=== League ===
Manager Tony Waddington continued to improve the squad prior to the start of 1964–65 season with experienced players. This policy found favour with the fans, the quality of an attack that included Peter Dobing, Dennis Viollet and Jimmy McIlroy was there for all too see, and local prospects flourished alongside this impressive forward line. One of whom was John Ritchie who was top scorer in 1964–65 with 25 league goals including four against Sheffield Wednesday who would sign Ritchie in 1966.

On 6 February 1965 Stanley Matthews again entered the record books when at the age of 50 years and five days he turned out for Stoke one last time against Fulham, Stoke won the match 3–1. To say thank you to Matthews, Stoke arranged a match against a team of international star players which was broadcast live to an estimated worldwide audience of 112 million.

More players arrived at Stoke during the season with the arrivals of Maurice Setters, Roy Vernon and Harry Burrows helping Stoke to finish in 11th position, winning and losing 16 matches.

=== FA Cup ===
After an impressive 4–1 win against Blackpool Stoke drew 0–0 with Manchester United before losing 1–0 at a foggy Old Trafford.

=== League Cup ===
Stoke, last season's runners-up, had a poor League Cup campaign this season as they needed a replay to beat Shrewsbury Town, then edged past Southend United before losing 3–1 away at Plymouth Argyle in a replay.

== Final league table ==
| Pos | Team | Pld | W | D | L | GF | GA | GAv | Pts | Qualification or relegation |
|---|---|---|---|---|---|---|---|---|---|---|
| 9 | West Ham United | 42 | 19 | 4 | 19 | 82 | 71 | 1.155 | 42 | Qualification for the Cup Winners' Cup first round (Note: West Ham United qualified for the European Cup Winners' Cup as the Cup Winners' Cup winners.) |
| 10 | Blackburn Rovers | 42 | 16 | 10 | 16 | 83 | 79 | 1.051 | 42 | |
| 11 | Stoke City | 42 | 16 | 10 | 16 | 67 | 66 | 1.015 | 42 | |
| 12 | Burnley | 42 | 16 | 10 | 16 | 70 | 70 | 1.000 | 42 | |
| 13 | Arsenal | 42 | 17 | 7 | 18 | 69 | 75 | 0.920 | 41 | |

Source: World Football
Rules for classification: 1) Points; 2) Goal average; 3) Goals scored

== Results ==
Stoke's score comes first

=== Legend ===
| Win | Draw | Loss |

=== Football League First Division ===
| Match | Date | Opponent | Venue | Result | Attendance | Scorers |
|---|---|---|---|---|---|---|
| 1 | 22 August 1964 | Everton | H | 0–2 | 43,431 | |
| 2 | 26 August 1964 | Sheffield United | A | 1–0 | 17,368 | Viollet |
| 3 | 29 August 1964 | Birmingham City | A | 2–1 | 20,692 | Ritchie, Bebbington |
| 4 | 2 September 1964 | Sheffield United | H | 0–1 | 27,489 | |
| 5 | 5 September 1964 | West Ham United | H | 3–1 | 26,420 | Viollet, Dobing, Bebbington |
| 6 | 9 September 1964 | Tottenham Hotspur | H | 2–0 | 36,897 | Viollet (2) |
| 7 | 12 September 1964 | West Bromwich Albion | A | 3–5 | 36,897 | Viollet, Ritchie (2) |
| 8 | 16 September 1964 | Tottenham Hotspur | A | 1–2 | 33,350 | Ritchie |
| 9 | 19 September 1964 | Manchester United | H | 1–2 | 40,031 | Ritchie |
| 10 | 26 September 1964 | Fulham | A | 4–1 | 15,177 | Ritchie (2), Viollet, Dobing |
| 11 | 3 October 1964 | Nottingham Forest | H | 1–1 | 28,913 | Philpott |
| 12 | 7 October 1964 | Blackburn Rovers | A | 1–1 | 12,509 | Palmer |
| 13 | 10 October 1964 | Leeds United | H | 2–3 | 27,651 | Ritchie, Kinnell |
| 14 | 17 October 1964 | Chelsea | A | 0–4 | 28,650 | |
| 15 | 24 October 1964 | Leicester City | H | 3–3 | 24,551 | Ritchie (2), Palmer |
| 16 | 31 October 1964 | Sunderland | A | 2–2 | 33,303 | Dobing, Palmer |
| 17 | 7 November 1964 | Wolverhampton Wanderers | H | 0–2 | 27,776 | |
| 18 | 14 November 1964 | Aston Villa | A | 0–3 | 19,789 | |
| 19 | 21 November 1964 | Liverpool | H | 1–1 | 28,816 | Ritchie |
| 20 | 28 November 1964 | Sheffield Wednesday | A | 1–1 | 17,266 | Ritchie |
| 21 | 5 December 1964 | Blackpool | H | 4–2 | 17,360 | Palmer (2), Dobing, Viollet |
| 22 | 12 December 1964 | Everton | A | 1–1 | 31,713 | Palmer |
| 23 | 26 December 1964 | Arsenal | A | 2–3 | 26,663 | Ritchie (2) |
| 24 | 28 December 1964 | Arsenal | H | 4–1 | 20,491 | Ritchie (2) (1 pen), Viollet, McIlroy |
| 25 | 2 January 1965 | West Ham United | A | 1–0 | 23,913 | Viollet |
| 26 | 16 January 1965 | West Bromwich Albion | H | 2–0 | 25,405 | Palmer, Viollet |
| 27 | 23 January 1965 | Manchester United | A | 1–1 | 50,392 | Bloor |
| 28 | 6 February 1965 | Fulham | H | 3–1 | 28,585 | Viollet (2), Ritchie |
| 29 | 13 February 1965 | Nottingham Forest | A | 1–3 | 21,829 | Palmer |
| 30 | 27 February 1965 | Chelsea | H | 0–2 | 27,965 | |
| 31 | 13 March 1965 | Blackburn Rovers | H | 1–1 | 19,284 | Viollet |
| 32 | 17 March 1965 | Birmingham City | H | 2–1 | 12,899 | Ritchie, Bebbington |
| 33 | 20 March 1965 | Wolverhampton Wanderers | A | 1–3 | 20,945 | Burrows |
| 34 | 27 March 1965 | Aston Villa | H | 2–1 | 20,375 | Woodward, Vernon |
| 35 | 3 April 1965 | Liverpool | A | 2–3 | 40,315 | Burrows, Vernon |
| 36 | 5 April 1965 | Leeds United | A | 1–3 | 38,133 | Setters |
| 37 | 10 April 1965 | Sheffield Wednesday | H | 4–1 | 16,047 | Ritchie (4) |
| 38 | 17 April 1965 | Blackpool | A | 1–1 | 18,263 | Ritchie |
| 39 | 19 April 1965 | Burnley | H | 2–0 | 19,781 | Ritchie, Vernon |
| 40 | 20 April 1965 | Burnley | A | 0–1 | 13,398 | |
| 41 | 24 April 1965 | Sunderland | H | 3–1 | 20,593 | Burrows, Ritchie, Vernon |
| 42 | 26 April 1965 | Leicester City | A | 1–0 | 8,717 | Vernon |

=== FA Cup ===
| Round | Date | Opponent | Venue | Result | Attendance | Scorers |
|---|---|---|---|---|---|---|
| R3 | 9 January 1965 | Blackpool | H | 4–1 | 38,651 | Ritchie (2), Viollet (2) |
| R4 | 30 January 1965 | Manchester United | H | 0–0 | 49,032 | |
| R4 Replay | 3 February 1965 | Manchester United | A | 0–1 | 50,874 | |

=== League Cup ===
| Round | Date | Opponent | Venue | Result | Attendance | Scorers |
|---|---|---|---|---|---|---|
| R2 | 23 September 1964 | Shrewsbury Town | H | 1–1 | 13,531 | Viollet |
| R2 Replay | 29 September 1964 | Shrewsbury Town | A | 1–0 | 15,304 | Palmer |
| R3 | 10 October 1964 | Southend United | H | 3–1 | 8,284 | Ritchie, Bebbington, Bridgwood |
| R4 | 4 November 1964 | Plymouth Argyle | H | 1–1 | 10,968 | Ritchie |
| R4 Replay | 11 November 1964 | Plymouth Argyle | A | 1–3 | 15,381 | Dobing |

=== Friendlies ===
| Match | Opponent | Venue | Result |
|---|---|---|---|
| 1 | Glentoran | A | 2–1 |
| 2 | Ballymena United | A | 6–0 |
| 3 | Manchester City | A | 2–1 |
| 4 | Heart of Midlothian | A | 2–1 |
| 5 | Bristol Rovers | A | 1–2 |
| 6 | Greenock Morton | A | 1–2 |
| 7 | Crewe Alexandra | A | 2–2 |
| 8 | Sir Stanley Matthews XI | H | 6–4 |
| 9 | Stævnet | A | 4–1 |
| 10 | Stockholm XI | A | 1–0 |
| 11 | Spartak Moscow | A | 0–1 |
| 12 | Zenit Leningrad | A | 3–2 |
| 13 | Finland XI | A | 9–1 |
| 14 | IFK Eskilstuna | A | 3–1 |

== Squad statistics ==
| Pos. | Name | League | | FA Cup | | League Cup | | Total | |
| Pos. | Name | Apps | Goals | Apps | Goals | Apps | Goals | Apps | Goals |
|---|---|---|---|---|---|---|---|---|---|
| GK | (Northern Ireland) Bobby Irvine | 1 | 0 | 0 | 0 | 1 | 0 | 2 | 0 |
| GK | (Scotland) Lawrie Leslie | 41 | 0 | 3 | 0 | 4 | 0 | 48 | 0 |
| DF | (England) Tony Allen | 37 | 0 | 3 | 0 | 3 | 0 | 43 | 0 |
| DF | (England) Bill Asprey | 35 | 0 | 3 | 0 | 5 | 0 | 43 | 0 |
| DF | (England) Alan Bloor | 15 | 1 | 2 | 0 | 4 | 0 | 21 | 1 |
| DF | (England) John Flowers | 0 | 0 | 0 | 0 | 1 | 0 | 1 | 0 |
| DF | (Scotland) George Kinnell | 40 | 1 | 3 | 0 | 3 | 0 | 46 | 1 |
| DF | (England) Eric Skeels | 42 | 0 | 3 | 0 | 5 | 0 | 50 | 0 |
| MF | (England) Gerry Bridgwood | 8 | 0 | 0 | 0 | 4 | 1 | 12 | 1 |
| MF | (England) Calvin Palmer | 36 | 8 | 3 | 0 | 3 | 1 | 42 | 9 |
| MF | (England) Alan Philpott | 12 | 1 | 0 | 0 | 4 | 0 | 16 | 1 |
| MF | (England) Maurice Setters | 16 | 1 | 3 | 0 | 0 | 0 | 19 | 1 |
| MF | (England) John Woodward | 3 | 1 | 0 | 0 | 0 | 0 | 3 | 1 |
| FW | (England) Keith Bebbington | 23 | 3 | 0 | 0 | 4 | 1 | 27 | 4 |
| FW | (England) Harry Burrows | 10 | 3 | 0 | 0 | 0 | 0 | 10 | 3 |
| FW | (England) Peter Dobing | 23 | 4 | 1 | 0 | 4 | 1 | 28 | 5 |
| FW | (England) Gerry Jones | 3 | 0 | 0 | 0 | 0 | 0 | 3 | 0 |
| FW | (Northern Ireland) Jimmy McIlroy | 31 | 1 | 3 | 0 | 2 | 0 | 36 | 1 |
| FW | (England) Stanley Matthews | 1 | 0 | 0 | 0 | 0 | 0 | 1 | 0 |
| FW | (England) John Ritchie | 41 | 25 | 3 | 2 | 5 | 2 | 49 | 29 |
| FW | (Wales) Roy Vernon | 10 | 5 | 0 | 0 | 0 | 0 | 10 | 5 |
| FW | (England) Dennis Viollet | 34 | 13 | 3 | 2 | 3 | 1 | 40 | 16 |
