= Gerry Jones (footballer) =

English footballer (1945–2021)

Personal information
- Full name: Gerald Jones
- Date of birth: 30 December 1945
- Place of birth: Middleport, Stoke-on-Trent, England
- Date of death: 18 August 2021 (aged 75)
- Position: Outside left

Senior career*
Years	Team	Apps	(Gls)
1963–1967	Stoke City	7	(0)
1967–1974	Stafford Rangers		
1974–1975	Macclesfield Town	2	(0)
Total		9	(0)
- * Club domestic league appearances and goals

Gerald Jones (30 December 1945 – 18 August 2021) was an English footballer who played in the Football League for Stoke City.

== Life and career ==
Jones was born in Middleport, Stoke-on-Trent and began his career with local side Stoke City. He played seven matches for Stoke in three seasons without establishing himself in Tony Waddington's first team and was released in May 1967. He went on to play for non-league sides Stafford Rangers and Macclesfield Town.

Jones died on 18 August 2021, at the age of 75.

== Career statistics ==
Appearances and goals by club, season and competition
Club	Season	League			FA Cup		League Cup		Total	
Club	Season	Division	Apps	Goals	Apps	Goals	Apps	Goals	Apps	Goals
Stoke City	1964–65	First Division	3	0	0	0	0	0	3	0
Stoke City	1965–66	First Division	2	0	0	0	0	0	2	0
Stoke City	1966–67	First Division	2	0	0	0	0	0	2	0
Stoke City	Total		7	0	0	0	0	0	7	0
Macclesfield Town	1974–75	Northern Premier League	2	0	0	0	0	0	2	0
Career total			9	0	0	0	0	0	9	0
