= Alan Bloor =

English football player and manager (born 1943)

Personal information
- Full name: Alan Bloor
- Date of birth: 16 March 1943 (age 83)
- Place of birth: Stoke-on-Trent, England
- Height: 6 ft 0 in (1.83 m)
- Position: Centre-half

Senior career*
Years	Team	Apps	(Gls)
1960–1978	Stoke City	388	(17)
1967	→ Cleveland Stokers (loan)	11	(1)
1978	Port Vale	6	(1)
Total		405	(19)

International career
- England Youth

Managerial career
- 1979: Port Vale
- * Club domestic league appearances and goals

Alan Bloor (born 16 March 1943) is an English former professional footballer and manager. He made 394 league appearances in the Football League for both Potteries teams.

He spent 18 years as a centre-half at Stoke City between 1960 and 1978, helping them to lift the League Cup in 1972, before spending a brief association with Port Vale as a player and manager between 1978 and 1979. He also briefly played for American club Cleveland Stokers in 1967. He is fifth in Stoke's all-time appearances list and was nicknamed "Bluto" by the club's supporters.

== Playing career ==
=== Stoke City ===
Bloor played centre-half for Stoke-on-Trent schoolboys and won youth caps with England. He started his career with Stoke City in 1960 on his 17th birthday. He made his first-team debut on 19 September 1961, playing alongside Eric Skeels in a 1–0 defeat by Brighton & Hove Albion at the Victoria Ground. He played a total of six Second Division games in 1961–62, but did not take to the field in another competitive fixture until the 1964–65 season; he played 15 First Division during the campaign, and scored his first senior goal in a 1–1 draw with Manchester United at Old Trafford on 23 January. He played 36 games in 1965–66 and 32 games in 1966–67. He was loaned out to Stoke's sister club Cleveland Stokers in 1967 and played 11 United Soccer Association games.

Bloor hit four goals in 43 appearances in 1967–68 and helped the "Potters" to finish three points above the relegation zone. He played 35 games in 1968–69, as Stoke again finished three points above the drop zone. He made 43 appearances in the 1969–70 season and 48 appearances in the 1970–71 season. He played 63 games in the 1971–72 season, including 11 League Cup games. He was a member of 1972 League Cup winning side that beat Chelsea 2–1 at Wembley to claim the club's first major trophy; he was part of a four-man defence along with John Marsh, Mike Pejic, and Denis Smith, playing in front of goalkeeper Gordon Banks.

Bloor played 33 games in 1972–73 and 31 games in 1973–74, helping the "Potters" to win the Watney Cup and finish in fifth in the top-flight. He could only play twice in 1974–75, as he picked up a serious back injury. He scored five goals in 37 appearances in 1975–76, including strikes at Anfield and Old Trafford. He scored twice in 40 appearances in 1976–77, as Stoke were relegated in what was Tony Waddington's last season as manager. Bloor started just five Second Division games in 1977–78, as the club changed managers between George Eastham, Alan A'Court, and Alan Durban.

=== Port Vale ===
Bloor moved to Port Vale, initially as a player and youth team coach, in June 1978. He made six Fourth Division appearances in 1978–79, scoring once in a 5–1 win over nearby Crewe Alexandra at Gresty Road on 25 August. He settled down to concentrate on his role behind the scenes at Vale Park in September 1978.

== Style of play ==
Bloor was a fearsome defender and a "voracious tackler". He played alongside Denis Smith for much of his Stoke career. He used his intelligence to read the game and clean up any mistakes the more aggressive Smith made.

== Managerial career ==
Bloor was appointed the caretaker manager of Port Vale in August 1979 following the departure of Dennis Butler and was appointed to the position on a full-time basis the following month. He sold Ken Todd to Portsmouth for £20,000, cancelled Ged Stenson's contract, and spent £30,000 on Crewe Alexandra defender Paul Bowles. Losing five of their seven games in October, the "Valiants" drifted to third-from-bottom. Vale went undefeated in the league in November, but Bloor unexpectedly resigned in December 1979, saying he did not 'have what it takes'. Coach Gordon Banks was also dismissed. He blamed the players for his downfall, claiming they did not like hard work.

== Career statistics ==
=== Playing statistics ===
Appearances and goals by club, season and competition
Club	Season	League			FA Cup		League Cup		Other		Total	
Club	Season	Division	Apps	Goals	Apps	Goals	Apps	Goals	Apps	Goals	Apps	Goals
Stoke City	1961–62	Second Division	6	0	0	0	1	0	—		7	0
Stoke City	1962–63	Second Division	0	0	0	0	1	0	—		1	0
Stoke City	1963–64	First Division	0	0	0	0	1	0	—		1	0
Stoke City	1964–65	First Division	15	1	2	0	4	0	—		21	1
Stoke City	1965–66	First Division	31	2	1	0	4	0	—		36	2
Stoke City	1966–67	First Division	31	0	1	0	1	0	—		33	0
Stoke City	1967–68	First Division	37	4	2	0	4	0	—		43	4
Stoke City	1968–69	First Division	29	0	4	0	2	0	—		35	0
Stoke City	1969–70	First Division	36	0	3	0	0	0	—		39	0
Stoke City	1970–71	First Division	36	1	8	0	2	0	6 (Note: Four appearances in Anglo-Italian Cup and two appearances and goal in Texaco Cup)	1	52	2
Stoke City	1971–72	First Division	35	0	9	0	11	0	8 (Note: Four appearances in Anglo-Italian Cup and four in Texaco Cup)	0	63	0
Stoke City	1972–73	First Division	28	2	1	0	2	1	2 (Note: Appearances in UEFA Cup)	0	33	3
Stoke City	1973–74	First Division	27	0	1	0	0	0	3 (Note: Appearances in Watney Cup)	0	31	0
Stoke City	1974–75	First Division	2	0	0	0	0	0	0	0	2	0
Stoke City	1975–76	First Division	32	5	4	0	1	0	—		37	5
Stoke City	1976–77	First Division	37	2	1	0	2	0	—		40	2
Stoke City	1977–78	Second Division	6	0	1	0	1	0	—		8	0
Stoke City	Total		388	17	38	0	37	1	19	1	482	19
Cleveland Stokers (loan)	1967	United Soccer Association	11	1	—		—		—		11	1
Port Vale	1978–79	Fourth Division	6	1	0	0	0	0	—		6	1
Career total			405	19	38	0	37	1	19	1	499	21

=== Managerial statistics ===
Managerial record by team and tenure
Team	From	To	Record				
Team	From	To	P	W	D	L	Win %
Port Vale	30 August 1979	1 December 1979	18	5	4	9	27.8
Total			18	5	4	9	27.8

== Honours ==
Stoke City

- Football League Cup: 1971–72
- Watney Cup: 1973
