= Toronto City FC =

Toronto City FC may refer to:

- AFC Toronto City, a planned women's team for the Project 8 soccer league
- Toronto City, a former Eastern Canada Professional Soccer League and United Soccer Association team

== See also ==
- Toronto FC, a current Major League Soccer team
