= Eric Skeels =

English footballer

Personal information
- Full name: Eric Thomas Skeels
- Date of birth: 27 October 1939 (age 86)
- Place of birth: Eccles, Lancashire, England
- Height: 5 ft 9 in (1.75 m)
- Position: Defender

Youth career
- 1957–1958: Stockport County

Senior career*
Years	Team	Apps	(Gls)
1959–1976	Stoke City	507	(7)
1967	→ Cleveland Stokers (loan)	12	(1)
1976	Seattle Sounders	16	(2)
1976–1977	Port Vale	5	(1)
- Leek Town
Total		540	(11)
- * Club domestic league appearances and goals

Eric Thomas Skeels (born 27 October 1939) is an English former footballer. He played 512 games in the Football League, 507 for Stoke City. He is Stoke's record appearance holder having played in 597 matches in all competitions.

Skeels joined Stoke City in 1959 and soon established himself as an indispensable member of Tony Waddington's starting eleven. He could play in all outfield positions, became known for his consistency, and racked up a club record 597 appearances. During his 17-year spell at the Victoria Ground he helped Stoke to win the Second Division in 1962–63, finish as runner-up of the League Cup in 1964, before winning the competition in 1972 he also helped them to reach the semi-final of the FA Cup in 1970–71 and 1971–72. He left for American side Seattle Sounders in 1976 before spending a short spell back in Stoke-on-Trent with Port Vale. He then became a pub landlord and played occasionally for Leek Town.

== Career ==
=== Stoke City ===
Skeels was born in Eccles, Lancashire and played with in the youth side of local club Stockport County. Playing as an inside-forward for County's Central League side, he attracted the attention of Birmingham City. He was offered a contract by Birmingham manager Arthur Turner. However, Turner then left, and Skeels could not sign the contract. The scout who had recommended him to Turner, Reg Savage, prompted Skeels to attend trials at Stoke City. He did well enough and signed a professional contract in November 1958. When Tony Waddington took over in August 1960, he converted Skeels into a fine-tackling half-back who thrived on the 'ugly side' of the game.

From September 1960, he missed just eleven matches in seven seasons, establishing a reputation for his consistency and became known as 'Mr Dependable'. During his career at the Victoria Ground he played in every outfield position, filling in as and when required. In his natural position, he was a defensive midfielder, although he made most of his appearances in the back four. Never a flashy player, he won a Second Division winner's medal in 1962–63 and a League Cup runners-up medal in 1964. Against Leicester City in August 1971, Skeels broke his leg in a tackle with Steve Whitworth. He battled his way back to fitness in time to replace the injured Denis Smith for the League Cup semi-final against West Ham United, helping Stoke to reach the 1972 League Cup final, where they beat Chelsea 2–1. Skeels established a club record for league appearances towards the end of the 1974–75 season, and with war-time fixtures considered unofficial he also lays claim to record appearance holder in all competitions with 597. He had already been awarded a joint-testimonial match with Tony Allen against Derby County in February 1969 when he was given a free transfer by Stoke in June 1976.

=== Later career ===
Skeels joined up with former teammate Geoff Hurst in the North American Soccer League with the Seattle Sounders, before signing for Roy Sproson's Port Vale in September 1976. He played five Third Division matches for the "Valiants" in the 1976–77 season, scoring once against Walsall. He then became the owner of the Hare and Hound pub in Glossop whilst making the occasional appearance for Leek Town. He returned to the Potteries to keep the Noah's Ark in Newcastle-under-Lyme and has also worked at Staffordshire University as a Porter.

== Career statistics ==
Appearances and goals by club, season and competition
Club	Season	League			FA Cup		League Cup		Other		Total	
Club	Season	Division	Apps	Goals	Apps	Goals	Apps	Goals	Apps	Goals	Apps	Goals
Stoke City	1959–60	Second Division	2	0	0	0	—		—		2	0
Stoke City	1960–61	Second Division	37	0	6	0	1	0	—		44	0
Stoke City	1961–62	Second Division	42	1	3	0	2	0	—		47	1
Stoke City	1962–63	Second Division	38	4	1	0	2	0	—		41	4
Stoke City	1963–64	First Division	39	0	5	0	10	0	—		54	0
Stoke City	1964–65	First Division	42	0	3	0	5	0	—		50	0
Stoke City	1965–66	First Division	41	0	1	0	5	0	—		47	0
Stoke City	1966–67	First Division	40	0	1	0	1	0	—		42	0
Stoke City	1967–68	First Division	34	0	2	0	4	0	—		40	0
Stoke City	1968–69	First Division	36	1	4	0	1	0	—		41	1
Stoke City	1969–70	First Division	35	0	1	0	1	0	—		37	0
Stoke City	1970–71	First Division	29	0	10	0	1	0	6 (Note: Four appearances in Anglo-Italian Cup and two in Texaco Cup)	0	46	0
Stoke City	1971–72	First Division	19	0	5	0	2	0	1 (Note: Appearance in Anglo-Italian Cup)	0	27	0
Stoke City	1972–73	First Division	31	0	0	0	2	0	1 (Note: Appearance in UEFA Cup)	0	34	0
Stoke City	1973–74	First Division	15	0	1	0	1	0	1 (Note: Appearance in Watney Cup)	0	18	0
Stoke City	1974–75	First Division	23	1	0	0	0	0	0	0	23	1
Stoke City	1975–76	First Division	4	0	0	0	0	0	—		4	0
Stoke City	Total		507	7	43	0	38	0	9	0	597	7
Cleveland Stokers (loan)	1967	United Soccer Association	12	1	—		—		—		12	1
Seattle Sounders	1976	North American Soccer League	16	2	—		—		—		16	2
Port Vale	1976–77	Third Division	5	1	0	0	0	0	0	0	5	1
Career total			540	11	43	0	38	0	9	0	630	11

== Honours ==
Stoke City

- Football League Second Division: 1962–63
- Football League Cup: 1971–72; runner-up: 1963–64
- Watney Cup: 1973
