= Paul Shardlow =

English footballer and cricketer

Personal information
- Full name: Paul Michael Shardlow
- Date of birth: 29 April 1943
- Place of birth: Stone, England
- Date of death: 14 October 1968 (aged 25)
- Place of death: Stoke-on-Trent, England
- Position: Goalkeeper

Youth career
- –1966: Northwich Victoria

Senior career*
Years	Team	Apps	(Gls)
1966–1968	Stoke City	3	(0)
1967–1968	→ Cleveland Stokers (loan)	36	(0)
Total		39	(0)
- * Club domestic league appearances and goals

Paul Michael Shardlow (29 April 1943 – 14 October 1968) was an English professional footballer who played as a goalkeeper for Stoke City. He also played cricket for Staffordshire.

== Career ==
=== Football career ===
Shardlow was born in Stone, Staffordshire and began his career with Northwich Victoria before joining Stoke City in 1966 as understudy to John Farmer and Gordon Banks. He played twice for Stoke towards the end of 1966–67 and played twice again in 1967–68. Shardlow also spent two seasons in the NASL with the Cleveland Stokers. He was put in the reserves for the 1968–69 season before his death on 14 October 1968 at the age of 25.

=== Cricket career ===
Shardlow played cricket for Staffordshire as a wicket-keeper in the Minor Counties Championship between 1960 and 1966.

== Death ==
Shardlow died on 14 October 1968 of a heart attack while on a training ground, at the age of 25. He was survived by his father, the cricketer Bertie Shardlow.

== Career statistics ==
Appearances and goals by club, season and competition
Club	Season	League			FA Cup		League Cup		Total	
Club	Season	Division	Apps	Goals	Apps	Goals	Apps	Goals	Apps	Goals
Stoke City	1966–67	First Division	2	0	0	0	0	0	2	0
Stoke City	1967–68	First Division	1	0	0	0	1	0	2	0
Cleveland Stokers (loan)	1967	United Soccer Association	4	0	—		—		4	0
Cleveland Stokers (loan)	1968	North American Soccer League	32	0	—		—		32	0
Career Total			39	0	0	0	1	0	40	0
