= Gerry Bridgwood =

English footballer (1944–2012)

Personal information
- Full name: Gerald Bridgwood
- Date of birth: 17 October 1944
- Place of birth: Stoke-on-Trent, England
- Date of death: 2 March 2012 (aged 67)
- Place of death: Goostrey, England
- Position: Midfielder

Youth career
- 1958–1960: Stoke City

Senior career*
Years	Team	Apps	(Gls)
1960–1968	Stoke City	95	(6)
1968–1973	Shrewsbury Town	117	(7)
- Telford United
Total		212	(13)
- * Club domestic league appearances and goals

Gerald "Gerry" Bridgwood (17 October 1944 – 2 March 2012) was an English footballer who played as a midfielder in the Football League for Shrewsbury Town and Stoke City. Bridgwood spent eight years at Stoke, in which time he was used as backup and was used sparingly by manager Tony Waddington.

== Career ==
Bridgwood started his career with local team Stoke City and made his professional debut at the end of the 1960–61 season at home to Brighton & Hove Albion. It took him a while to establish himself in Tony Waddingtons squad and he was used as a back up player in his time at Stoke. In total Bridgwood played in 111 matches for Stoke scoring eight goals in nine seasons. His most productive season was the 1966–67 as he made 26 appearances. He also played six matches in the club's run to the 1964 Football League Cup Final. He left for regular football in 1968 and joined Shrewsbury Town where he spent five years before ending his career with Telford United.

== Personal life ==
After finishing his playing career Bridgwood and his wife Cynthia became pub landlords. They owned The Greyhound (Stafford) for many years. Since the early 1990s they owned the Crown Inn, Goostrey. Bridgwood's eldest son, Mark, a ceramic artist, lives with his family in U.S. His youngest son, Scott is a painter in the UK.

== Death ==
Gerry Bridgwood died on 2 March 2012 after a suspected heart attack just days after he had decided to retire from the pub trade.

== Career statistics ==
Appearances and goals by club, season and competition
Club	Season	League			FA Cup		League Cup		Total	
Club	Season	Division	Apps	Goals	Apps	Goals	Apps	Goals	Apps	Goals
Stoke City	1960–61	Second Division	1	0	0	0	0	0	1	0
Stoke City	1961–62	Second Division	5	0	0	0	0	0	5	0
Stoke City	1962–63	Second Division	4	0	1	0	1	0	6	0
Stoke City	1963–64	First Division	16	2	0	0	6	0	22	2
Stoke City	1964–65	First Division	8	0	0	0	4	1	12	1
Stoke City	1965–66	First Division	15	2	0	0	1	0	16	2
Stoke City	1966–67	First Division	25	2	0	0	1	0	26	2
Stoke City	1967–68	First Division	15	0	0	0	1	1	16	1
Stoke City	1968–69	First Division	6	0	0	0	1	0	7	0
Stoke City	Total		95	6	1	0	15	2	111	8
Shrewsbury Town	1968–69	Third Division	4	0	0	0	0	0	4	0
Shrewsbury Town	1969–70	Third Division	30	2	1	0	2	0	33	2
Shrewsbury Town	1970–71	Third Division	23	1	2	0	1	0	26	1
Shrewsbury Town	1971–72	Third Division	35	2	3	0	2	0	40	2
Shrewsbury Town	1972–73	Third Division	25	2	3	0	1	0	29	2
Shrewsbury Town	Total		117	7	10	0	6	0	132	7
Career total			212	13	10	0	21	2	243	13
