= Tony Wagstaff =

English footballer

Personal information
- Full name: Anthony Wagstaff
- Date of birth: 19 February 1944 (age 82)
- Place of birth: Wombwell, England
- Position: Midfielder

Senior career*
Years	Team	Apps	(Gls)
1961–1969	Sheffield United	138	(19)
1969–1973	Reading	166	(5)
Total		304	(24)
- * Club domestic league appearances and goals

Anthony Wagstaff (born 19 February 1944 in Wombwell) is an English former footballer who played for Reading and Sheffield United in the position of midfielder.

Wagstaff became an apprentice at Bramall Lane in June 1960, turning professional in March 1961. Following promotion to Division One in April 1961, he debuted in a 4–1 home win against Middlesbrough at Bramall Lane on 29 April 1961, in the final match of 1960-61 season. Wagstaff was not a regular in the Sheffield United first team until the latter stages of season 1962-63 when he netted four goals in 15 league appearances, including the winner in a 1–0 victory at Birmingham City on 23 March 1963.

In 1963-64, he scored 9 times in 37 league matches, which was the best scoring spell of his career. Many believed that his apparent lack of pace and power reduced the effectiveness of such a skilled player.

When his brother Barry made Sheffield United's first team, the pair were often in and out of the side. By the time the team were relegated to Division Two in 1968, Tony's appearances had become very limited and the Wagstaffs were sold to Reading for a combined fee of £17,500. Tony had played 157 competitive games (138 league games) for Sheffield United scoring 21 (19 league) goals in all.

Tony stayed at Reading until 1973, making 185 competitive appearances (166 league games) and scoring 6 times (5 league goals).
