= Allan Mason (cricketer) =

English cricketer

Personal information
- Full name: Allan Mason
- Born: 2 May 1921; Addingham, Yorkshire, England
- Died: 22 March 2006 (aged 84); Keighley, Yorkshire, England
- Batting: Right-handed
- Bowling: Slow left-arm orthodox

Domestic team information
- Years: Team
- 1947–1950: Yorkshire

Career statistics
Competition	First-class
Matches	18
Runs scored	105
Batting average	6.56
100s/50s	–/–
Top score	22
Balls bowled	4,129
Wickets	51
Bowling average	28.88
5 wickets in innings	1
10 wickets in match	–
Best bowling	5/56
Catches/stumpings	6/–
- Source: Cricinfo, 4 July 2022

Allan Mason (2 May 1921 – 22 March 2006) was an English first-class cricketer, who played eighteen times for Yorkshire between 1947 and 1950. A slow left arm bowler, he took 51 wickets at 28.88, with a best of 5 for 56 against Northamptonshire, his only five-wicket haul.

A right-handed batsman, he scored 105 runs at 6.56, with a top score of 22 against Sussex. He also held six catches.

He played for the Yorkshire Second XI from 1939 to 1950.
