= John Woodward (English footballer) =

English footballer

Personal information
- Full name: John Woodward
- Date of birth: 16 January 1947 (age 79)
- Place of birth: Tunstall, Stoke-on-Trent, England
- Height: 6 ft 0 in (1.83 m)
- Position: Forward

Senior career*
Years	Team	Apps	(Gls)
1964–1966	Stoke City	11	(1)
1966–1969	Aston Villa	26	(7)
1969–1973	Walsall	125	(23)
1973–1975	Port Vale	99	(30)
1975–1977	Scunthorpe United	19	(5)
- Oostende
- Kidderminster Harriers
Total		280+	(66+)
- * Club domestic league appearances and goals

John Woodward (born 6 January 1947) is an English former footballer. A forward, he scored 66 goals in 269 league games in a 13-year career in the Football League. He played and scored in all four divisions of the Football League.

He began his career at Stoke City before he was sold to Aston Villa for a £30,000 fee in October 1966. He switched to Walsall three years later before he joined Port Vale for a fee of £2,250 in February 1973. He finished as the club's top-scorer in 1973–74 but suffered a loss of form and was allowed to join Scunthorpe United in May 1975. After two years with the "Iron", he had spells with Belgian club Oostende and Southern League side Kidderminster Harriers.

== Career ==
Woodward began his career with Stoke City, playing three First Division games in the 1964–65 season. He scored his first senior goal on 27 March 1965, in a 2–1 victory over Aston Villa at the Victoria Ground. He played six games without scoring in 1965–66, and made just two appearances in 1966–67. Aston Villa had been suitably impressed, however, to offer £30,000 for the striker's services in October 1966, and "Potters" boss Tony Waddington gladly accepted the offer. He was signed to replace Tony Hateley, who had been sold to Chelsea.

The "Villans" suffered relegation in 1966–67, and could only finish 16th and 18th in the Second Division in 1967–68 and 1968–69. Woodward scored seven goals in 26 league games during a turbulent time at Villa Park, in which Dick Taylor, Tommy Cummings, and Tommy Docherty all had brief spells as manager.

He moved on to Bill Moore's Walsall in May 1969. Walsall who posted a 12th-place finish in the Third Division in 1969–70. The "Saddlers" avoided relegation on goal difference in 1970–71, before rising to ninth in 1971–72. John Smith then took over at Fellows Park, and led the club to a 17th-place finish in 1972–73. He scored 23 goals in 125 league games during his four-year spell at the club.

Woodward joined league rivals Port Vale for a fee of £2,250 in February 1973. He hit nine goals in 17 Third Division games in 1972–73, as Gordon Lee's "Valiants" finished four places and four points shy of promotion. Woodward hit 18 goals in 48 appearances in 1973–74 to finish as the club's top-scorer. However, Lee resigned in January, and the club finished just one place above the relegation zone under new boss Roy Sproson. Under Sproson's management there were numerous contract disputes, and Woodward was the first to get into such a dispute, and was placed on the transfer-list at his own request in July 1974. Sproson said, "he is trying to hold us to ransom and we are not having that". Woodward only hit five goals in 41 games in 1974–75, and was given a free transfer in May 1975.

He moved on to Fourth Division side Scunthorpe United for the 1975–76 campaign. The "Iron" avoided the re-election places on goal difference and then finished one place and one point above the re-election zone in 1976–77 under the stewardship of Ron Ashman. Woodward then departed the Old Showground and had a spell in Belgium with Oostende before returning to England to play at Aggborough for Southern League side Kidderminster Harriers.

== Career statistics ==
Appearances and goals by club, season and competition
Club	Season	League			FA Cup		League Cup		Total	
Club	Season	Division	Apps	Goals	Apps	Goals	Apps	Goals	Apps	Goals
Stoke City	1964–65	First Division	3	1	0	0	0	0	3	1
Stoke City	1965–66	First Division	6	0	0	0	0	0	6	0
Stoke City	1966–67	First Division	2	0	0	0	0	0	2	0
Stoke City	Total		11	1	0	0	0	0	11	1
Aston Villa	1966–67	First Division	3	2	0	0	0	0	3	2
Aston Villa	1967–68	Second Division	10	2	2	1	0	0	12	3
Aston Villa	1968–69	Second Division	13	3	0	0	1	0	14	3
Aston Villa	Total		26	7	2	1	1	0	29	8
Walsall	1969–70	Third Division	36	6	7	1	1	0	44	7
Walsall	1970–71	Third Division	41	7	2	1	2	1	45	9
Walsall	1971–72	Third Division	27	4	5	2	1	0	33	6
Walsall	1972–73	Third Division	21	6	0	2	1	0	22	8
Walsall	Total		125	23	14	6	5	1	144	30
Port Vale	1972–73	Third Division	17	9	0	0	0	0	17	9
Port Vale	1973–74	Third Division	43	16	4	2	1	0	48	18
Port Vale	1974–75	Third Division	39	5	2	0	0	0	41	5
Port Vale	Total		99	30	6	2	1	0	106	32
Scunthorpe United	1975–76	Fourth Division	19	5	0	0	0	0	19	5
Career total			280	66	22	9	7	1	309	76
