= Peter Dobing =

English footballer (1938–2026)

Personal information
- Full name: Peter Dobing
- Date of birth: 1 December 1938
- Place of birth: Manchester, England
- Date of death: 26 October 2026 (aged 87)
- Position: Inside forward

Senior career*
Years	Team	Apps	(Gls)
1955–1961	Blackburn Rovers	179	(88)
1961–1963	Manchester City	82	(31)
1963–1973	Stoke City	307	(82)
1967	→ Cleveland Stokers (loan)	8	(7)
Total		576	(208)

International career
1959–1961	England U23	8	(1)
- * Club domestic league appearances and goals

Peter Dobing (1 December 1938 – 26 October 2026) was an English professional footballer who played as an inside forward in the Football League for Blackburn Rovers, Manchester City and Stoke City.

== Career ==
Dobing was born in Manchester and came from a sporting family, his father playing rugby league for Salford. At first Dobing chose to play as an amateur footballer, which allowed him to play for more than one club. This backfired on him as he signed for both Manchester United and Blackburn Rovers and was selected by each club for the upcoming 'A' team game. He resolved the situation by signing a professional contract with Blackburn in December 1955.

In 1957–58, Dobing scored 20 league goals as Blackburn gained promotion to the First Division, including four in one match against Bristol City. The following season he scored 24 league goals, the highest figure of his career. In 1959–60 Dobing played a large part in Blackburn's FA Cup run which saw them reach the final, scoring five goals during the cup run. However, Rovers were soundly beaten 3–0 by Wolverhampton Wanderers in the final. In 1961 he moved to Manchester City for £37,500.

Manchester City signed Dobing as a replacement for Denis Law, who had departed for Italian side Torino. He made his Manchester City debut in the opening match of the 1961–62 season, a 3–1 win against Leicester City. He started all but one of Manchester City's matches that season, finishing the season as the club's top scorer with 22 goals. The following season was less successful; Dobing scored 10 goals in 50 appearances in a year which ended in relegation. In the close season Dobing was sold to newly promoted Stoke City.

Stoke manager Tony Waddington broke the club's record transfer fee, paying Man City £37,500 for Dobing's services as Stoke looked to establish themselves back in the First Division. In Dobing's first season at Stoke, he scored 19 goals as the club reached the final of the League Cup, but were beaten 4–3 on aggregate by Leicester City. He suffered a broken leg against West Bromwich Albion in January 1965, ending his season. During his recovery, he spent time fishing for trout in Market Drayton and was a keen clay pigeon shooter. He was also a pipe smoker and became known as 'the pipe-smoking gentleman of English football'. However, his relationship with the fans was not that good as, after his recovery, he refused to re-sign for the 1965–66 season wanting a pay increase, and finally accepted Stoke's offer three weeks later. He won the fans over with a brilliant individual performance against Leeds United in April 1968, scoring a hat-trick against England international defender Jack Charlton. With the 1960s coming to an end, Waddington decided to move the ageing Dobing into a midfield position alongside George Eastham, and this duo's passing ability improved Stoke's attacking play as the side went on to win their first major trophy, the League Cup in 1972. Dobing captained the side as Stoke beat Chelsea 2–1.

Dobing was known for his short temper on the pitch, which once resulted in him receiving a nine-week suspension. His playing career ended due to a broken leg sustained in 1973. He then worked in the Staffordshire pottery industry.

== Death ==
Dobing died on 26 October 2026, aged 87.

== Career statistics ==
Appearances and goals by club, season and competition
Club	Season	League			FA Cup		League Cup		Other		Total	
Club	Season	Division	Apps	Goals	Apps	Goals	Apps	Goals	Apps	Goals	Apps	Goals
Blackburn Rovers	1956–57	Second Division	25	8	1	0	—		—		26	8
Blackburn Rovers	1957–58	Second Division	34	20	6	5	—		—		40	25
Blackburn Rovers	1958–59	First Division	40	24	2	2	—		—		42	26
Blackburn Rovers	1959–60	First Division	40	18	8	5	—		—		48	23
Blackburn Rovers	1960–61	First Division	40	18	5	4	4	0	—		49	22
Blackburn Rovers	Total		179	88	22	16	4	0	—		205	104
Manchester City	1961–62	First Division	41	22	2	0	1	0	—		44	22
Manchester City	1962–63	First Division	41	9	3	0	6	1	—		50	10
Manchester City	Total		82	31	5	0	7	1	—		94	32
Stoke City	1963–64	First Division	39	16	2	0	9	3	—		50	19
Stoke City	1964–65	First Division	23	4	1	0	4	1	—		28	5
Stoke City	1965–66	First Division	38	11	1	0	5	2	—		44	13
Stoke City	1966–67	First Division	41	19	1	0	1	0	—		43	19
Stoke City	1967–68	First Division	37	15	1	0	5	0	—		43	15
Stoke City	1968–69	First Division	40	8	4	2	2	0	—		46	10
Stoke City	1969–70	First Division	40	6	3	0	1	0	—		44	6
Stoke City	1970–71	First Division	11	2	0	0	2	0	2 (Note: Appearances in Texaco Cup)	0	15	2
Stoke City	1971–72	First Division	28	1	9	1	10	3	6 (Note: Four appearances and goal in Anglo-Italian Cup and two appearances in Texaco Cup)	1	53	6
Stoke City	1972–73	First Division	10	0	0	0	1	0	0	0	11	0
Stoke City	Total		307	82	22	3	40	9	8	1	377	95
Cleveland Stokers (loan)	1967	United Soccer Association	8	7	—		—		—		8	7
Career total			576	208	49	19	51	10	8	1	684	238

== Honours ==
Blackburn Rovers

- Football League Second Division runner-up: 1957–58
- FA Cup runner-up: 1959–60

Stoke City

- Football League Cup: 1971–72; runner-up: 1963–64
