= Sven-Gunnar Larsson =

Swedish footballer

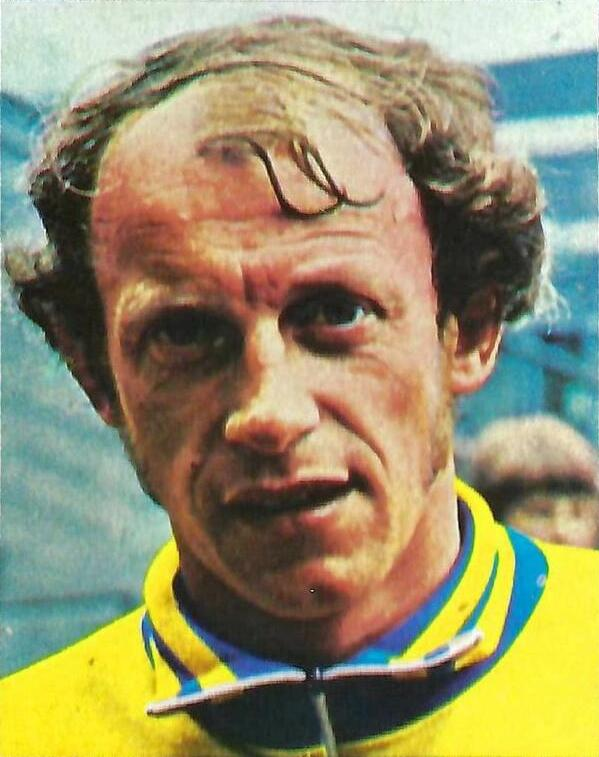
- Larsson in the 1974 FIFA World Cup

Personal information
- Date of birth: 10 May 1940 (age 86)
- Place of birth: Sweden
- Position: Goalkeeper

Senior career*
Years	Team	Apps	(Gls)
1958–1961	IF Saab		
1962–1975	Örebro SK		
1976–1978	Grankulla IFK		

International career
1965–1974	Sweden	27	(0)
- * Club domestic league appearances and goals

Sven-Gunnar Larsson (born 10 May 1940) is a Swedish former footballer who played as a goalkeeper.

Larson represented Örebro SK and made 273 appearances in Allsvenskan from 1962 to 1975.

He was capped 27 times for the Sweden national team and participated in the 1970 FIFA World Cup and the 1974 FIFA World Cup as a second goalkeeper.

In November 1965 he was signed as an amateur by the City of Stoke of the English first division. The move was vetoed by the Football Association. He made only one appearance, in a friendly against Moscow Dynamo.
