= 1972 Football League Cup final =

- Event: 1971–72 Football League Cup
Stoke City	Chelsea
2	1
- Date: 4 March 1972
- Venue: Wembley Stadium, London
- Referee: Norman Burtenshaw (Great Yarmouth)
- Attendance: 97,852

The 1972 Football League Cup final took place on 4 March 1972 at Wembley Stadium and was contested by Chelsea and Stoke City.

Chelsea went into the match as strong favourites having won the FA Cup and the UEFA Cup Winners' Cup in the previous two seasons, whereas Stoke were attempting to win their first major trophy. Terry Conroy put Stoke into the lead early on, but Chelsea hit back through Peter Osgood just before half time. Stoke got the decisive final goal from veteran George Eastham to end their 109-year wait for a major honour. It remains the club's only major trophy victory; the closest they have come since then to beating this achievement was in 2011 when they lost to Manchester City in the 2011 FA Cup final.

== Match review ==
Both sides reached the final after semi-final ties with Chelsea beating Tottenham Hotspur and Stoke, West Ham United. The match took place on 4 March 1972 at Wembley Stadium in front of 97,852 with around 35,000 travelling down from Stoke-on-Trent.

Despite it being Stoke's first major final they showed no signs of nerves as they took the game to the "Blues" and after only five minutes, a long throw-in from Peter Dobing was headed on by Denis Smith. Chelsea's defence panicked and Terry Conroy was quickest to react to put Stoke into the lead. Chelsea improved their game, but it was Stoke who should have scored again with both Dobing and Jimmy Greenhoff being denied by the agile Peter Bonetti. A rare mistake from Alan Bloor inside his own goal-area brought Chelsea an equaliser just before half-time with Peter Osgood taking full advantage.

After the break Stoke again forced Chelsea back into their own half and although the play became rather scrappy both sides should have scored. But then on 73 minutes George Eastham scored a second goal for Stoke after Greenhoff's shot was only blocked by Bonetti. Gordon Banks made a number of saves to keep Stoke's one goal advantage intact and Stoke held out to secure their first major trophy. The club marked the achievement by parading the trophy in an open top bus around Stoke-on-Trent. Stoke's victory meant that 12 different teams had won the competition in its first 12 seasons.

== Match details ==
4 March 1972

Stoke City	2–1	Chelsea
Conroy 5'; Eastham 73'		Osgood 45'

Wembley Stadium, London
Attendance: 97,852
Referee: Norman Burtenshaw

Stoke City	Chelsea

GK	1	(England) Gordon Banks
DF	2	(England) Jackie Marsh
DF	3	(England) Mike Pejic
MF	4	(England) Mike Bernard
DF	5	(England) Denis Smith
DF	6	(England) Alan Bloor
MF	7	(Republic of Ireland) Terry Conroy
MF	8	(England) Jimmy Greenhoff		Substituted off
FW	9	(England) John Ritchie
FW	10	(England) Peter Dobing (c)
MF	11	(England) George Eastham
Substitutes:
MF	12	(Wales) John Mahoney	Substituted on
Manager:
(England) Tony Waddington

GK	1	(England) Peter Bonetti
DF	2	(Republic of Ireland) Paddy Mulligan	Substituted off
DF	3	(England) Ron Harris (c)
MF	4	(England) John Hollins
DF	5	(Republic of Ireland) John Dempsey
DF	6	(England) David Webb
MF	7	(Scotland) Charlie Cooke
FW	8	(England) Chris Garland
FW	9	(England) Peter Osgood
MF	10	(England) Alan Hudson
MF	11	(England) Peter Houseman
Substitutes:
FW	12	(England) Tommy Baldwin	Substituted on
Manager:
(England) Dave Sexton

== Road to Wembley ==
Home teams listed first.

=== Stoke City ===
Round 2: Southport 1–2 Stoke City

Round 3: Oxford United 1–1 Stoke City

Replay Stoke City 2–0 Oxford United

Round 4: Manchester United 1–1 Stoke City

Replay Stoke City 0–0 Manchester United
2nd Replay Stoke City 2–1 Manchester United

Quarter final: Bristol Rovers 2–4 Stoke City

Semifinal, 1st leg: Stoke City 1–2 West Ham United

Semifinal, 2nd leg: West Ham United 0–1 Stoke City

Replay Stoke City 0–0 West Ham United
2nd Replay Stoke City 3–2 West Ham United

=== Chelsea ===
Round 2: Plymouth Argyle 0–2 Chelsea

Round 3: Nottingham Forest 1–1 Chelsea

Replay Chelsea 2–1 Nottingham Forest

Round 4: Chelsea 1–1 Bolton Wanderers

Replay Bolton Wanderers 0–6 Chelsea

Quarter final: Norwich City 0–1 Chelsea

Semifinal, 1st leg: Chelsea 3–2 Tottenham Hotspur

Semifinal, 2nd leg: Tottenham Hotspur 2–2 Chelsea

Chelsea won 5–4 on aggregate
