= Nobby Lawton =

English footballer

Personal information
- Full name: Norbert Lawton
- Date of birth: 25 March 1940
- Place of birth: Newton Heath, Manchester, Lancashire, England
- Date of death: 22 April 2006 (aged 66)
- Place of death: Manchester, England
- Height: 5 ft 9 1/2 in (1.77 m)
- Positions: Inside forward; wing half

Youth career
- 1956–1960: Manchester United

Senior career*
Years	Team	Apps	(Gls)
1960–1963	Manchester United	36	(6)
1963–1967	Preston North End	143	(22)
1967–1971	Brighton & Hove Albion	112	(14)
1971–1972	Lincoln City	20	(0)
Total		301	(42)
- * Club domestic league appearances and goals

Norbert "Nobby" Lawton (25 March 1940 – 22 April 2006) was an English footballer who played as an inside forward or wing half for various English clubs in the 1960s and early 1970s.

Born in Newton Heath, Manchester, Lawton began his football career with Manchester United, joining the club as an amateur in 1956. He was also involved in the club's 1957 FA Youth Cup title. Following the Munich air disaster in 1958, Lawton gave up his job with a local coal merchant to sign professional forms with Manchester United. However, while playing for the club's reserve team, Lawton succumbed to a heavy bout of the flu, leading to double pneumonia and the temporary loss of the use of his legs.

He was out of action for several months but eventually made his debut for the first team on 9 April 1960, playing at inside left in a 3–2 win over Luton Town at Kenilworth Road. Over the next couple of seasons, Lawton forged a partnership with Bobby Charlton on the left side of the United forward line, scoring a hat-trick against Nottingham Forest on Boxing Day 1961, but by the 1962–63 season he was increasingly deployed as a wing half. The emergence of Paddy Crerand, however, meant that Lawton's first team opportunities became increasingly limited and he was sold to Preston North End in March 1963.

In his first season at Preston, Lawton captained the Lancashire side to the FA Cup final, where they lost to West Ham United. He continued to captain the side for the next three seasons, before a succession of knee injuries forced his sale to Brighton & Hove Albion in September 1967. He spent a further three seasons with Brighton before dropping down to the Fourth Division to play for Lincoln City in 1970. He retired from professional football in 1972 and took several jobs before returning to Newton Heath in 1977 to work for an export packaging firm.

He died from cancer in April 2006 (shortly after his 66th birthday) and is survived by his wife, their two children and their 6 grandchildren.

== Honours ==
Preston North End

- FA Cup runner-up: 1963–64
