= Sammy McMillan =

Northern Irish footballer

Personal information
- Full name: Samuel Thomas McMillan
- Date of birth: 20 September 1941 (age 85)
- Place of birth: Belfast, Northern Ireland
- Positions: Left winger; centre forward

Youth career
- Boyland Youth Club
- 1957–1961: Manchester United

Senior career*
Years	Team	Apps	(Gls)
1961–1963	Manchester United	15	(6)
1963–1967	Wrexham	149	(52)
1967–1969	Southend United	77	(5)
1969–1970	Chester	18	(0)
1970–1972	Stockport County	74	(29)
1972–?	Oswestry Town	?	(?)

International career
1962	Northern Ireland	2	(0)
1964	Northern Ireland U23	1	(0)
- * Club domestic league appearances and goals

Samuel Thomas McMillan (born 20 September 1941) is a Northern Irish ex-footballer who played as a left winger or centre forward for various Football League clubs in the 1960s and early 1970s, including Manchester United, Wrexham, Southend United and Stockport County.

Born in Belfast, McMillan started his football career with the Boyland Youth Club in Northern Ireland before being picked up by Manchester United at the age of 16. He signed his first professional contract with the club in November 1959, but it was not until 4 November 1961 that he made his first team debut. The game ended up as a 3–1 defeat by Sheffield Wednesday, but McMillan was not disheartened and went on to score six goals that season, in which he played in 11 matches.

McMillan's first season at Old Trafford led to him being picked for the Northern Ireland national team in the autumn of 1962. He played in two matches, against England and Scotland in the 1963 British Home Championship, but failed to get on the scoresheet and only played for his country on one further occasion – an Under-23 international in 1964.

With Manchester United, a similar story to his international career followed for McMillan in 1962–63. He only made four appearances during the entire season, all of which came before Christmas, and he was unable to add to the six goals he had scored in his first season. The same happened at the start of the 1963–64 season, and although United manager Matt Busby offered to extend McMillan's contract by a year, the Ulsterman was desperate for first team football and he was sold to Wrexham for £8,000 on Christmas Eve 1963.

McMillan scored a commendable seven goals from 20 appearances in his first season with Wrexham, but it was not enough to prevent the Welsh side from being relegated to the Fourth Division. In five seasons with Wrexham, McMillan scored a total of 52 goals, including a season's best of 18 in 1966–67, and was just one appearance short of 150 for the Red Dragons before being sold to Southend United for £6,000 in 1967. At Southend, McMillan was deployed in a more withdrawn midfield role than he had been with Manchester United and Wrexham, and so he scored just five goals in nearly 80 appearances for the Shrimpers.

After just over two seasons with Southend, a £2,000 move to Wrexham's local rivals Chester followed, but he was released to sign for Stockport County at the end of the 1969–70 season. At Stockport, McMillan reverted to his old position in the forward line and amassed a total of 29 league goals in 74 appearances before a back injury forced his retirement in 1972.
