= Cleveland Stokers =

Defunct soccer club in the United States

- Full name: Cleveland Stokers
- Founded: 1967
- Dissolved: 1969; 57 years ago
- Stadium: Cleveland Stadium
- Capacity: 78,000
- Chairman: Vernon Stouffer; Gabe Paul; Howard Metzenbaum; Alva "Ted" Bonda
- League: USA (1967); NASL (1968)
Home colors

The Cleveland Stokers were a soccer team based in Cleveland, Ohio that played in the United Soccer Association during 1967 and the North American Soccer League in 1968. Their home field was Cleveland Stadium.

== History ==
=== United Soccer Association ===
In 1966 a group of United States and Canadian sports entrepreneurs, led by Jack Kent Cooke, formed the United Soccer Association with the intention of organizing a professional soccer league. The USA originally intended to launch its league in the spring of 1968. However a rival league, the National Professional Soccer League, announced it was ready to launch in 1967. Not wanting to lose ground to its rival, the USA decided to fast track its launch. Without any players of its own, it opted to import whole teams from Europe and South America. It was intended that these teams would represent the franchises during the inaugural season, giving them time to build their own squads for the following season. Stoke City, who played in the Football League First Division subsequently represented the Cleveland, Ohio franchise.

The traveling Stoke party included the likes of Gordon Banks, Peter Dobing, George Eastham, Maurice Setters and Roy Vernon as well as manager Tony Waddington. The team started well going undefeated in their first seven matches defeating Washington Whips 2–1, Boston Rovers 1–0, San Francisco Golden Gate Gales and Dallas Tornado both 4–1. They then suffered back to back 2–1 defeats to New York Skyliners and Houston Stars before a 2–0 win over Toronto City put them back on track for a play-off place. However a goalless draw with Detroit Cougars and a 3–1 defeat in the final match against Vancouver Royals saw the Stokers miss out on a play-off spot by a single point.

=== NASL ===
Following the 1967 season, the USA merged with the National Professional Soccer League to form the North American Soccer League with the teams from the former USA having to create their rosters from scratch. The franchise was originally acquired by Cleveland Indians baseball club principal owner Vernon Stouffer and club president Gabe Paul in August 1966. They sold the Stokers to a group led by Cleveland attorney Howard Metzenbaum and business partner, Alva "Ted" Bonda, the first week of January 1968.

In assembling a team of their own, the new owners acquired the bulk of the starting line-up from the 1967 NPSL Philadelphia Spartans franchise, which would not participate in the NASL in 1968. The new Stokers won their division and fully intended on continuing operation. However, a difference in business philosophy with the five surviving NASL franchises saw the Stokers stay dormant in 1969. They did host an exhibition featuring a number of Stokers and NASL "all-stars" versus a West German opponent, which drew well, and fostered some hope, but Metzenbaum and Bonda remained unhappy with the NASL budgetary restraints, and announced the end of the Stokers in November 1969. The 1968 Stokers won their division after a tight race with the talented Chicago Mustangs.

In the conference championships, they were defeated in sudden-death overtime by the eventual champion Atlanta Chiefs. But the highlight of the club's existence occurred on July 10, 1968, at Cleveland Municipal Stadium, when they hosted and defeated the soccer world's top-ranked professional team, Santos of Brazil, featuring Pelé. Keeper Paul Shardlow preserved the 2–1 upset by saving a penalty kick. Unfortunately, Shardlow, leased from Stoke City, collapsed and died of a heart attack whilst training in England in October 1968, after the completion of the Stokers' season.

Those who represented the Stokers so well in the field during 1968 included Rubén Navarro, a world-class defender who made numerous national-team appearances with Argentina, his native land - where his name and play remain legendary - and Enrique Mateos, a veteran goal scorer from Spain - part of the powerful Real Madrid dynasty of the late 1950s. Stoker performers familiar to modern-day North American fans include John Best (later Seattle coach and Vancouver GM), and Roy Turner (later Dallas Tornado iron-man and then long-time coach of the indoor Wichita Wings). Peter Short and Hank Liotart also enjoyed long U.S. soccer careers following their season in Cleveland.

Stokers' head coach Norman Low returned to England and did scouting. He later briefly scouted for the ASL Cleveland Cobras. Metzenbaum embarked on a high-profile political career, while Bonda became a prominent Cleveland figure in education, business, and sports.

== Media coverage ==
The Stokers had a small number of matches televised by WEWS, 2 the first season and one the second. Paul Wilcox was commentator. WXEN-FM broadcast nearly every match both seasons, Joe Wendel initially did commentary, followed by Van Lane and Van Portucia.

== Year-by-year ==
Year	League	W	L	T	Pts	Regular season	Playoffs	Avg. attendance
1967	USA	5	3	4	14	2nd, Eastern Division	Did not qualify	6,567
1968	NASL	14	7	11	175	1st, Lakes Division	Lost Playoff (Atlanta)	4,305

== Honors ==
Division titles

- 1968: NASL Lakes Division

First team All-Star Selections

- 1967: Peter Dobing, George Eastham, Roy Vernon
- 1968: Rubén Navarro

Second team All-Star Selections

- 1967: Gordon Banks, Eric Skeels, John Moore
- 1968: Enrique Mateos

Hall of Fame members

- Indoor Soccer: Roy Turner
