= Jackie Marsh (footballer) =

English footballer (born 1948)

Personal information
- Full name: John Henry Marsh
- Date of birth: 31 May 1948 (age 78)
- Place of birth: Stoke-on-Trent, England
- Position: Right back

Youth career
- 1964–1967: Stoke City

Senior career*
Years	Team	Apps	(Gls)
1967–1979	Stoke City	355	(2)
1976–1977	→ Los Angeles Aztecs (loan)	15	(1)
1979–1980	Bulova SA		
–	Northwich Victoria		
Total		370	(3)
- * Club domestic league appearances and goals

John Henry Marsh (born 31 May 1948) is an English former footballer who played for Stoke City. He played as a right back.

Marsh began his career with his local club Stoke City making his debut in 1967. He soon became a member of Tony Waddington's first team in the 1970s as Stoke enjoyed their most successful period in their history. March played in the 1972 Football League Cup final as Stoke beat Chelsea 2–1 to claim their first major honour. He also played for the club the UEFA Cup. In total Marsh made 440 appearances for Stoke in 12 seasons he spent at the Victoria Ground.

== Career ==
Marsh was born in Stoke-on-Trent and was a star performer in the youth teams at Stoke City. A boyhood Stoke fan Marsh realised his dream making his debut against Arsenal on the opening day of the 1967–68. He made the right back position his own the following season making 30 appearances. Marsh was a combative right-back who had good control and a fair turn of speed for a small chunky player. He specialised in hard low crosses into the box which allowed forwards to flick on to others or volley towards goal. Jimmy Greenhoff recalls: "Jackie was so skilful, I am sure if he had played for Manchester United he would have played for England. He was a defender who played like a midfielder." He played 47 times in 1970–71 as Stoke reached the semi-final of the FA Cup losing out to Arsenal. He then played in 69 matches during the hectic 1971–72 season which saw Stoke again lose to Arsenal at the semi-final stage but they did beat Chelsea 2–1 in the 1972 League Cup final earning the "Potters" their first major trophy.

He remained a solid and consistent performer for Stoke at right-back under Tony Waddington throughout the 1970s. In January 1976 a severe storm in Stoke-on-Trent saw the Victoria Ground badly damaged and as a result the club had to sell their players to fund the repair costs. Marsh resisted any move away but a threadbare squad suffered relegation 1976–77. They gained a quick return to the top tier in 1978–79. Marsh was given a free transfer in the summer of 1979 and he went on to play for Los Angeles Aztecs and joined Terry Conroy in Hong Kong with Bulova SA. He returned to England to play for non-league Northwich Victoria.

== Career statistics ==
Appearances and goals by club, season and competition
Club	Season	League			FA Cup		League Cup		Other		Total	
Club	Season	Division	Apps	Goals	Apps	Goals	Apps	Goals	Apps	Goals	Apps	Goals
Stoke City	1967–68	First Division	4	0	0	0	1	0	—		5	0
Stoke City	1968–69	First Division	30	1	4	0	1	0	—		35	1
Stoke City	1969–70	First Division	36	0	3	0	1	0	—		40	0
Stoke City	1970–71	First Division	36	0	8	0	2	0	5 (Note: Four appearances in Anglo-Italian Cup and one in Texaco Cup)	0	51	0
Stoke City	1971–72	First Division	41	0	8	0	12	0	8 (Note: Four appearances and goal in Anglo-Italian Cup and four appearances in Texaco Cup)	1	69	1
Stoke City	1972–73	First Division	38	0	1	0	3	0	2 (Note: Appearances in UEFA Cup)	0	44	0
Stoke City	1973–74	First Division	31	0	0	0	4	0	5 (Note: Two appearances in Texaco Cup and three in Watney Cup)	0	40	0
Stoke City	1974–75	First Division	38	1	1	0	4	0	2	0	45	1
Stoke City	1975–76	First Division	26	0	4	0	1	0	—		31	0
Stoke City	1976–77	First Division	17	0	1	0	2	0	—		20	0
Stoke City	1977–78	Second Division	34	0	2	0	1	0	—		37	0
Stoke City	1978–79	Second Division	24	0	0	0	3	0	—		27	0
Stoke City	Total		355	2	32	0	35	0	22	1	444	3
Los Angeles Aztecs (loan)	1976	North American Soccer League	15	1	—		—		—		15	1
Career total			370	3	32	0	35	0	22	1	459	4

== Honours ==
Stoke City

- Football League Cup: 1971–72
- Football League Second Division third-place promotion: 1978–79
