= Terry Conroy =

Irish former professional footballer

Personal information
- Full name: Gerard Anthony Francis Conroy
- Date of birth: 2 October 1946 (age 80)
- Place of birth: Dublin, Ireland
- Height: 5 ft 10 in (1.78 m)
- Positions: Winger; forward

Youth career
- 1956–1964: Home Farm

Senior career*
Years	Team	Apps	(Gls)
1964	Home Farm		
1965–1967	Glentoran		
1967–1979	Stoke City	271	(49)
1967	→ Cleveland Stokers (loan)		
1968	→ Cleveland Stokers (loan)	0	(0)
1979	Bulova		
1980–1981	Crewe Alexandra	37	(5)
1981–1982	Waterford		
1982–1983	Limerick United		
Total		308	(54)

International career
1969–1977	Republic of Ireland	27	(2)
- * Club domestic league appearances and goals

Gerard Anthony Francis Conroy (born 2 October 1946) is an Irish former professional footballer. A winger and forward, he scored 74 goals in 372 league and cup appearances in a 14-year career in the English Football League from 1967 to 1981. He also scored two goals and won 27 caps for the Republic of Ireland in a seven-year international career from 1969 to 1977.

Raised in Cabra, Dublin, he began his career at Home Farm before spending two years with Glentoran from 1965 to 1967. With Glentoran, he won the Steel & Sons Cup and Irish Cup in 1966 and helped the club to win the Irish League title in 1966–67. He was sold to English First Division club Stoke City in March 1967 for a fee of £15,000, and went on to help Stoke to win the League Cup in 1972. He spent 12 years with Stoke, scoring 67 goals in 333 league and cup appearances. He was a popular figure with Stoke fans due to his creative flair and dribbling ability, as well as his distinctive pale skin, bright ginger hair and sideburns.

He moved to Hong Kong to play for Bulova in 1979. He returned to England the following year to join Crewe Alexandra in the Fourth Division. He signed with Irish club Waterford in September 1981, moving on to Limerick United in November 1982, where he ended his career. He later ran his own insurance business and worked for Stoke City and the Football Association of Ireland. He is married and has three daughters.

== Club career ==
=== Ireland ===
Gerard Anthony Francis Conroy was born in Dublin to John (Jack) and Esther Conroy, and was one of ten siblings: Alphonsus (Ollie), Laurence (Lar), John (Donny), Rita, Peter, Michael, Vincent, Paul, and Marie. Christened as Gerard, he soon became known by the name Terry as he could not pronounce 'Gerard' as a young child. His mother held two jobs: as a factory worker and an office cleaner. The family lived in the suburb of Cabra, and had very limited finances. Being one of the younger children he was indulged, and took advantage of his lack of household chores to spend the majority of his time playing football in the street. However he was arrested by a plain-clothed policeman and sentenced to probation in Children's Court for playing football in the street. He later credited his ball control skills to the many years he spent playing football with large numbers of other children in the tight streets of Cabra. His father and brothers were in the printing trade, and his brother Ollie, a talented footballer, rejected the opportunity to turn professional at Wolverhampton Wanderers in 1950 in order to remain employed in Dublin as a machine minder and play football part-time in the League of Ireland. Three more of his brothers also played in the League of Ireland, and both Ollie and Michael played in the Shelbourne team that won the FAI Cup in 1960.

Conroy began his career with Home Farm, where he won four Irish youth caps. He played for the Home Farm under-13s at the age of ten, at a time when Home Farm were considered the best youth team in the country. The club held the registration of many of the country's top young players. Future Ireland international Billy Newman played in Conroy's age group. However, Conroy was determined to go beyond playing in the League of Ireland and was determined to play as a professional in the English Football League. However, he was frequently told that he was too short to be taken on as an apprentice by an English club. However, a late growth spurt saw him grow an extra six inches to reach the height of 5 ft 10 in (1.78 m) at age 17. By this time, he also began playing for the Home Farm senior team in the League of Ireland B Division.

In 1964, Conroy was offered a contract at Shelbourne and Shamrock Rovers. However he instead moved to Northern Irish club Glentoran, where he believed that he would have a better chance of being spotted by an English club. He received a signing-on fee of £600. As the club were based in Belfast he had to spend the night at manager Billy Neill's house after midweek games as he would miss the last train back to Dublin, and would have to instead catch the train the following morning to make it back to his regular job as a printer. He played for the Glentoran 'Seconds' (reserve team) in the final of the Steel & Sons Cup on 25 December 1965, which ended in a 1–0 victory over Larne. He scored on his first team debut two days later, a 3–2 win over Bangor. He went on to score both goals for Glentoran in the Irish Cup final on 23 April 1966, a 2–0 win over Linfield at The Oval. In total he scored eight goals in the 1965–66 season, as the "Glens" finished third in the Irish League, two points behind champions Linfield. He went on to score 25 goals in the 1966–67 campaign, as Glentoran won the league by a one-point margin. He also played in Europe, as the Irish Cup win also qualified Glentoran to a place in the European Cup Winners' Cup in 1966–67, and he helped the club to a 1–1 draw at home with eventual runners-up Rangers before they suffered a 4–0 loss at Ibrox Stadium. He received a league winner's medal despite leaving the club before the end of the season.

=== Stoke City ===
Conroy had played for Home Farm in a friendly match against Stoke City at the age of 17 and impressed City manager Tony Waddington, who continued to track Conroy's progress via his local scout George Eastham, Sr. However Fulham initially agreed a fee with Glentoran, but Waddington took the same train as Conroy after he left negotiations at Craven Cottage and successfully talked Conroy into signing with Stoke. This approach was actually an illegal approach according to FA rules. Conroy turned down a printer's apprenticeship after his talk with Waddington and moved across the Irish Sea in March 1967 for a fee of £15,000 (£10,000 plus two conditional bonus payments of £2,500). In the summer, he was registered with the Cleveland Stokers, Stoke City's United Soccer Association franchise team, and in his own words "played a handful of games without making too much impact".

After taking the place of winger Gerry Bridgwood in the first team, he made an instant impact on his debut on 6 September 1967 by scoring the winning goal in a 3–2 victory over Leicester City at the Victoria Ground. Though Conroy only made nine league appearances in the 1967–68 season, he was present on the final day 2–1 win over Liverpool which kept Stoke out of the First Division relegation zone. He was again registered with the Cleveland Stokers – now in the North American Soccer League – in the summer of 1968, but did not play a first-team game for the club. He started to become a first-team regular for Stoke in the 1968–69 season after scoring against Liverpool at Anfield on 20 August, and went on to score in four consecutive games over the Christmas period. Waddington did, though sometimes prefer to play John Mahoney to Conroy, using Mahoney as an extra defensive midfielder to make Stoke more solid defensively. Conroy also damaged cartilage in his knee after being challenged heavily by Manchester City's left-half Alan Oakes in a 3–1 defeat at Maine Road on 29 March and was ruled out of action for five months. After recovering, he went on to make 33 appearances in the 1969–70 campaign and got some measure of revenge over Manchester City at Maine Road on 17 January by scoring the only goal of the game after dribbling past three defenders from the half-way line.

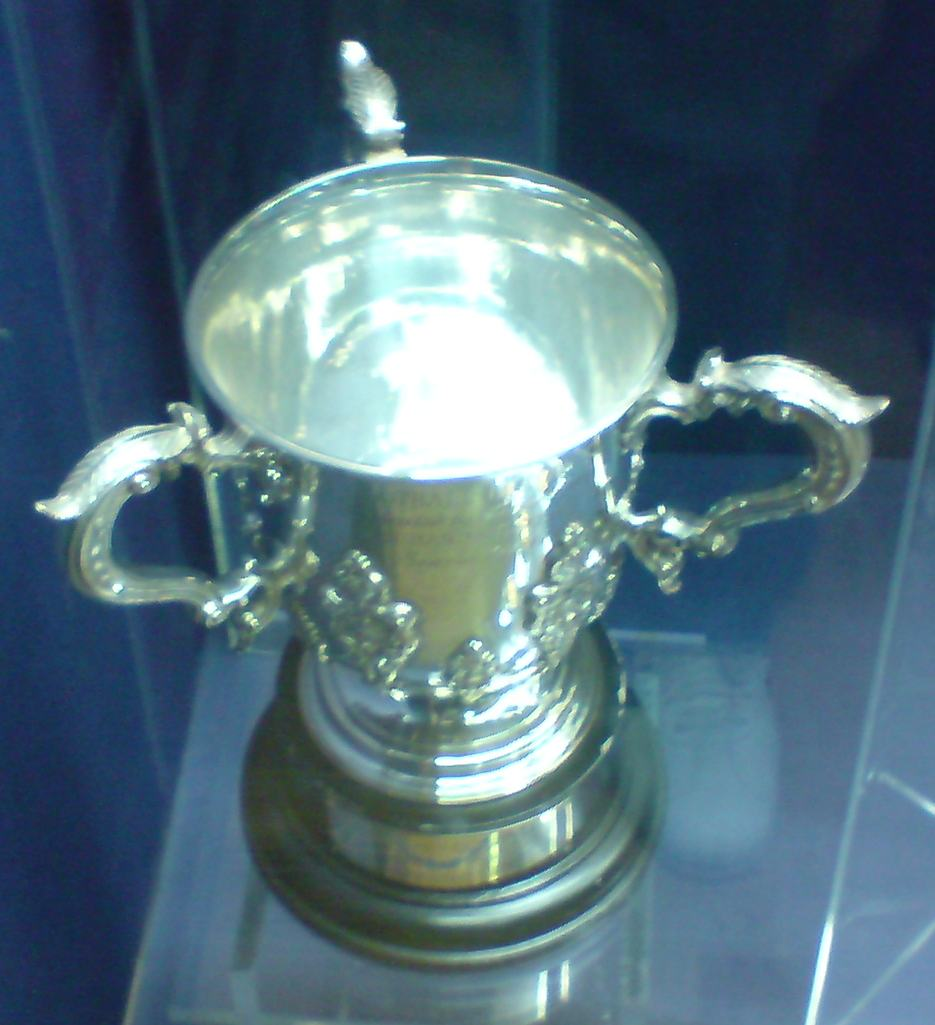
The League Cup trophy, won by Stoke City in 1972

He scored 14 goals in the 1970–71 campaign, the highest tally he ever recorded, including one in a 5–0 victory over Arsenal on 26 September that came third in the BBC Goal of the Season competition. The goal came after he played a one-two with Peter Dobing before striking a first-time shot into the net from 25-yards. Stoke reached the semi-finals of the FA Cup for the first time since 1899 in 1970–71, where they lost 2–0 to Arsenal after a replay; in the original tie, Stoke had led 2–1 before conceding an equaliser five minutes into injury time. Conroy played in 19 of Stoke's 21 FA Cup and League Cup games in the 1971–72 season, as they reached the semi-finals of the FA Cup and the final of the League Cup. In the League Cup Stoke defeated Southport, Oxford United (after a replay), Manchester United (after two replays), Bristol Rovers and West Ham United (after two replays) to reach the Wembley final against Chelsea. Conroy was a key figure in the semi-final decider at Old Trafford against West Ham, as he won a penalty in the first half and then scored the winning goal on 49 minutes with a 25-yard volley. He also opened the scoring in the final itself, as he converted a simple header after five minutes and helped Stoke to go on to secure the first trophy in the club's history with a 2–1 victory. Stoke also reached the semi-finals of the FA Cup, again losing to Arsenal, though Conroy missed this game as he was sidelined for the rest of the season after he injured his cartilage again in a defeat to Leeds United on 8 April.

Stoke's League Cup success won them qualification into the UEFA Cup for the first time in the club's history in 1972–73, and Conroy scored Stoke's first goal in Europe on 13 September, a 3–1 victory over German side 1. FC Kaiserslautern at the Victoria Ground. However Kaiserslautern won the return leg 4–0 to eliminate Stoke at the First Round. Stoke went on to finish 15th in the league, with Conroy claiming five goals in 39 appearances. The club then finished fifth in the 1973–74 campaign, but Conroy missed much of the season with recurring cartilage problems and featured in just eleven games. He underwent surgery to remove more cartilage from his knees and as a result, lost some of his natural pace and strength, making him a less effective player for the remainder of his career.

Stoke qualified for Europe again in 1974–75 and managed to draw both legs with Dutch side Ajax, only to exit the competition on the away goals rule. However, Conroy again struggled with injuries and was limited to just 16 league appearances. He played most of these games as a centre-forward, as regular striker John Ritchie missed much of the season with a broken leg and Geoff Hurst was nearing the end of his career and was unable to play every game. Conroy scored his two career hat-tricks during the campaign, against Halifax Town in the League Cup on 11 September, and then against Carlisle United in a 5–2 league win on 22 March. At the end of the season, Stoke had three games to play against mid-table sides and needed to win all three to win the league however they lost at Sheffield United and had goalless draws with Newcastle United and Burnley, leaving the club with another fifth-place finish. Conroy was again limited to just 16 league appearances as he continued to suffer injury problems in the 1975–76 season and underwent an operation to remove all the remaining cartilage from his knees. The club also suffered a disaster, as a strong gale blew a section of the roof off the Victoria Ground's Butler Street Stand on 2 January. As the correct insurance was not in place, the club were forced to sell key players such as Jimmy Greenhoff, Mike Pejic, Alan Hudson, John Mahoney and Geoff Salmons to finance stadium repairs.

Stoke were relegated at the end of the 1976–77 season after winning just one of their final 15 games, with new manager George Eastham proving unable to turn around the club's slump after he replaced Waddington as manager in March. Conroy later blamed complacency on the part of the players, admitting that he "never conceived" that Stoke could be relegated after their successes earlier in the decade. Eastham was sacked after a poor start to life in the Second Division in 1977–78. Though his replacement, Alan Durban, managed to improve results, Conroy was not suited to Durban's new playing style. Durban asked Conroy to play as a midfield player rather than as a winger and told Conroy he was free to look for a new club at the expiry of his contract. Stoke won promotion at the end of the 1978–79 campaign, though Conroy was limited to just seven league appearances.

=== Later career ===
Conroy was offered a contract by Worcester City and spoke with Tranmere Rovers manager John King, but instead joined Hong Kong club Bulova on a free transfer in 1979. His two-year contract was cancelled by mutual consent after he pushed the head coach in a dressing room incident. In his autobiography, You Don't Remember Me Do You?, Conroy stated that "the five months we [his family] were there seemed like five years".

He signed with Crewe Alexandra in a move that reunited him with Tony Waddington, his former manager at Stoke City. Crewe were at the bottom of the Fourth Division when Conroy arrived. Though they only improved by one place by the end of the 1979–80 season, Crewe were re-elected to the Football League. He went on to play 30 games in midfield in the 1980–81 campaign as the "Railwaymen" improved to finish in 18th position. He retired at the end of the season to attempt to launch a career in coaching. However, he failed to find a position at club level to supplement his part-time role coaching the Republic of Ireland national team. He later played at a semi-professional level in Ireland, joining Waterford United in September 1981, and then Limerick in November 1982.

== International career ==
Conroy won his first international cap under manager Mick Meagan on 7 October 1969, playing in a 3–0 World Cup qualification defeat to Czechoslovakia in Prague. He scored his first goal for the Republic of Ireland in a 2–1 defeat to the Soviet Union at Lansdowne Road on 18 October 1972. He scored in Ireland's next game, a 2–1 win over France at Dalymount Park on 15 November. Both of these games were qualification games for the 1974 FIFA World Cup; Ireland failed to qualify after finishing second in 1974 FIFA World Cup qualification for UEFA Group 9, the Soviet Union qualified as group winners whilst France finished third.

On 3 July 1973, he appeared for a Shamrock Rovers XI in a friendly match against the Brazil national team at Lansdowne Road; he scored a goal in what ended as a 4–3 defeat. He played his final game for Ireland on 24 April 1977, a 0–0 draw with Poland at Dalymount Park. He returned to the international fold though in 1981, when he was appointed as assistant to the manager Eoin Hand. Hand's contract was not renewed in 1985, and Conroy also left his role soon before new manager Jack Charlton took charge.

== Style of play ==
Conroy was a firm fan favourite amongst Stoke City supporters due to his ability to create something out of nothing and his distinctive pale skin, bright ginger hair and sideburns. He was a talented dribbler. He described himself as having "the classic winger's role; a trick, then head down and go, hit the byline and cross".

"This red-haired ghost impressed me at Anfield where he was bundled over the touchline by a massive Liverpool defender. Terry got up took the return pass and after battling down the wing he flicked the ball past Tommy Lawrence with the outside of his boot. That is flair"

— Daily Express journalist Derek Potter.

== Personal life ==
Conroy met Sue at The Place nightclub in Hanley in 1970, and the pair got married on 13 May 1972. They had three daughters together: Tara (born 1974), Niamh (born 1982), and Sinead (born 1986).

After retiring from football, Conroy sold pottery on a market stall for three years. He later ran an insurance business in Ashton-under-Lyne and later supervised industrial cleaning contract work at exhibitions and shows. He returned to former club Stoke City in 1997 to work in the hospitality department at the new Britannia Stadium. He later also worked as a PA matchday announcer at the ground. He was also appointed welfare officer by the Football Association of Ireland in 2008, giving him the responsibility to look after Irish youngsters who came to the UK to join academy scholarship programmes. His contract with the FAI was not renewed when it expired in 2011.

In March 2011, Conroy fell seriously ill with a suspected vascular aneurysm. He successfully recovered from the illness after undergoing a life-saving emergency operation that had a survival rate of just 10%. Whilst in hospital he had been given the last rites twice. He published his autobiography, You Don't Remember Me Do You?, in August 2014.

== Career statistics ==
=== Club ===
Appearances and goals by club, season and competition
Club	Season	League			FA Cup		League Cup		Other		Total	
Club	Season	Division	Apps	Goals	Apps	Goals	Apps	Goals	Apps	Goals	Apps	Goals
Stoke City	1967–68	First Division	9	1	0	0	2	0	—		11	1
Stoke City	1968–69	First Division	31	7	4	2	1	0	—		36	9
Stoke City	1969–70	First Division	31	2	2	0	0	0	—		33	2
Stoke City	1970–71	First Division	34	11	9	2	2	1	2 (Note: Appearances in Texaco Cup)	0	47	14
Stoke City	1971–72	First Division	27	4	6	4	11	3	2	0	46	11
Stoke City	1972–73	First Division	33	4	1	0	3	0	2 (Note: Appearances in UEFA Cup)	1	39	5
Stoke City	1973–74	First Division	9	0	0	0	0	0	5 (Note: Two appearances in Texaco Cup and three appearances and goal in Watney Cup)	1	14	1
Stoke City	1974–75	First Division	16	10	1	0	2	3	2	0	21	13
Stoke City	1975–76	First Division	16	4	1	0	1	0	—		18	4
Stoke City	1976–77	First Division	36	5	0	0	2	1	—		38	6
Stoke City	1977–78	Second Division	22	1	1	0	0	0	—		23	1
Stoke City	1978–79	Second Division	7	0	0	0	2	0	—		9	0
Stoke City	Total		271	49	25	8	26	8	13	2	335	67
Crewe Alexandra	1979–80	Fourth Division	7	1	0	0	0	0	—		7	1
Crewe Alexandra	1980–81	Fourth Division	30	4	1	0	1	2	—		32	6
Crewe Alexandra	Total		37	5	1	0	1	2	—		39	7
Career total			308	54	26	8	27	10	13	2	374	74

=== International ===
- Sourced from Terry Conroy profile at national-football-teams.com

Republic of Ireland
Year	Apps	Goals
1969	3	0
1970	6	0
1972	2	2
1973	3	0
1974	4	0
1975	5	0
1976	3	0
1977	1	0
Total	27	2

== Honours ==
Glentoran

- Steel & Sons Cup: 1966
- Irish Cup: 1966
- Irish League: 1966–67

Stoke City

- Football League Cup: 1971–72
- Watney Cup: 1974
