= 1976–77 Stoke City F.C. season =

Stoke City
1976–77 season
- Chairman: Albert Henshall
- Manager: Tony Waddington, George Eastham
- Stadium: Victoria Ground
- Football League First Division: 21st (34 Points)
- FA Cup: Third Round
- League Cup: Third Round
- Top goalscorer: League: Garth Crooks (6); All: Garth Crooks (6)
- Highest home attendance: 29,905 vs Liverpool (11 April 1977)
- Lowest home attendance: 12,225 vs Coventry City (16 February 1977)
- Average home league attendance: 19,027
Home colours

The 1976–77 season was Stoke City's 70th season in the Football League and the 46th in the First Division.

The roof of the Butler Street Stand was rebuilt at a massive cost of £250,000 and with the club unable to pay off the insurers they turned to the playing staff to generate the required funds and with the likes of Jimmy Greenhoff, Alan Hudson and Mike Pejic being sold off Tony Waddington had a threadbare squad and he left the club in March 1977. Former player George Eastham took over but was unable to prevent Stoke losing their First Division status, going down by a single point.

== Season review ==
=== League ===
The 1976–77 season opened with a new all steel Butler Street roof in place which would cost the sum of £250,000. With the club struggling to pay the cost they had to begin a fire sale of their best players. Those who left the club included Sean Haslegrave to Nottingham Forest for £35,000, Ian Moores to Tottenham Hotspur for £75,000, Jimmy Greenhoff to Manchester United for £100,000, Alan Hudson to Arsenal for £200,000 and Mike Pejic to Everton for £140,000. These were indeed, body blows none more so than Jimmy Greenhoff leaving after he scored just over 100 goals for the club and was idolised by the supporters.

The Stoke fans were totally confused at what was happening to their team and looked for someone to blame. Goals were again in short supply, Stoke failed to find the back of the net for five successive league matches from late November to early January and in fact they managed just 28 goals all season, 21 at home and seven away. Waddington's gambles on experienced player like John Tudor and Alan Suddick were not successful and after an awful defeat at home to Leicester City on 19 March 1977 Waddington's time at Stoke City was up. He had spent 25 years at the Victoria Ground as manager, assistant and coach and is considered to be the club's greatest manager having helped them win their first major trophy in 1972. He remained an avid supporter of the club until his death in 1994.

Waddington's assistant George Eastham was put in temporary charge with coach Alan A'Court his assistant. With the transfer deadline passed with no new players arrived, so Eastham turned towards the youth team to try to advert the drop, all to no avail and on a Monday evening at Villa Park in front of 29,000 fans, Stoke needing a win to stay up, lost 1–0 and were duly relegated to the second tier.

=== FA Cup ===
Everton beat Stoke 2–0 in the third round on their way to the semi-final.

=== League Cup ===
Stoke beat Leeds United 2–1 and then lost badly 3–0 to Newcastle United.

== Final league table ==
Pos	Team	Pld	W	D	L	GF	GA	GD	Pts	Qualification or relegation
18	Bristol City	42	11	13	18	38	48	−10	35	
19	Coventry City	42	10	15	17	48	59	−11	35	
20	Sunderland (R)	42	11	12	19	46	54	−8	34	Relegation to the Second Division
21	Stoke City (R)	42	10	14	18	28	51	−23	34	Relegation to the Second Division
22	Tottenham Hotspur (R)	42	12	9	21	48	72	−24	33	Relegation to the Second Division

Source: World Football
Rules for classification: 1) Points; 2) Goal difference; 3) Goals scored
(R) Relegated

== Results ==
Stoke's score comes first

=== Legend ===
Win	Draw	Loss

=== Football League First Division ===
Match	Date	Opponent	Venue	Result	Attendance	Scorers
1	21 August 1976	Sunderland	H	0–0	27,244	
2	24 August 1976	Bristol City	A	1–1	25,316	Smith 86'
3	28 August 1976	Manchester City	A	0–0	39,875	
4	4 September 1976	West Ham United	H	2–1	19,131	Crooks 32', Conroy 52'
5	11 September 1976	Everton	A	0–3	22,277	
6	18 September 1976	Ipswich Town	H	2–1	20,171	Tudor (2) 2', 19'
7	25 September 1976	Queens Park Rangers	A	0–2	21,621	
8	29 September 1976	Leicester City	A	0–1	15,391	
9	2 October 1976	Aston Villa	H	1–0	26,652	Conroy 37'
10	16 October 1976	Arsenal	A	0–2	28,507	
11	23 October 1976	Derby County	H	1–0	20,916	Tudor 70'
12	30 October 1976	Newcastle United	A	0–1	28,251	
13	6 November 1976	Middlesbrough	H	3–1	16,068	Waddington 20', Greenhoff (2) 47', 54'
14	10 November 1976	Leeds United	A	1–1	29,199	Dodd 86'
15	20 November 1976	Birmingham City	H	1–0	21,486	Crooks 70'
16	27 November 1976	Tottenham Hotspur	A	0–2	22,230	
17	18 December 1976	West Bromwich Albion	H	0–2	15,989	
18	27 December 1976	Liverpool	A	0–4	50,371	
19	1 January 1977	Middlesbrough	A	0–0	21,140	
20	22 January 1977	Sunderland	A	0–0	22,901	
21	29 January 1977	Norwich City	A	1–1	18,408	Salmons 48'
22	5 February 1977	Manchester City	H	0–2	27,139	
23	12 February 1977	West Ham United	A	0–1	20,106	
24	16 February 1977	Coventry City	H	2–0	12,255	Conroy (2) 1', 55' (pen)
25	19 February 1977	Everton	H	0–1	19,586	
26	26 February 1977	Ipswich Town	A	1–0	25,865	Goodwin 37'
27	5 March 1977	Queens Park Rangers	H	1–0	15,454	Bowers 47'
28	15 March 1977	Newcastle United	H	0–0	12,708	
29	19 March 1977	Leicester City	H	0–1	14,087	
30	23 March 1977	Arsenal	H	1–1	13,951	Conroy 7'
31	2 April 1977	Derby County	A	0–2	23,161	
32	9 April 1977	Manchester United	A	0–3	53,102	
33	11 April 1977	Liverpool	H	0–0	29,905	
34	12 April 1977	Leeds United	H	2–1	17,960	Crooks (2) 67', 76'
35	16 April 1977	Birmingham City	A	0–2	19,554	
36	20 April 1977	Bristol City	H	2–2	12,277	Smith 56', Bloor 70'
37	23 April 1977	Tottenham Hotspur	H	0–0	15,641	
38	30 April 1977	Coventry City	A	2–5	15,720	Ruggiero (2) 40', 66' (pen)
39	7 May 1977	Norwich City	H	0–0	13,202	
40	11 May 1977	Manchester United	H	3–3	24,632	Crooks (2) 40', 65', Bloor 49'
41	14 May 1977	West Bromwich Albion	A	1–3	22,772	Suddick 22'
42	16 May 1977	Aston Villa	A	0–1	28,931	

=== FA Cup ===
Round	Date	Opponent	Venue	Result	Attendance	Scorers
R3	8 January 1977	Everton	A	0–2	32,981	

=== League Cup ===
Round	Date	Opponent	Venue	Result	Attendance	Scorers
R2	1 September 1976	Leeds United	H	2–1	22,550	Conroy 75', Greenhoff 89'
R3	22 September 1976	Newcastle United	A	0–3	25,126	

=== Friendlies ===
Match	Opponent	Venue	Result
1	Śląsk Wrocław	A	1–0
2	Indonesia XI	A	1–1
3	Persebaya Surabaya	A	2–0
4	Ajax	A	1–2
5	AS Cannes	A	2–0
6	AS Monaco	A	0–1
7	Olympique Lyonnais	A	1–2
8	FC Porto	A	0–1
9	Genoa	A	0–0
10	Chirk AAA	A	6–0
11	Hibernian	A	1–0
12	Blackpool	A	4–2
13	Hereford United	A	0–1

== Squad statistics ==
Pos.	Name	League		FA Cup		League Cup		Total	
Pos.	Name	Apps	Goals	Apps	Goals	Apps	Goals	Apps	Goals
GK	(England) Roger Jones	2	0	0	0	0	0	2	0
GK	(England) Peter Shilton	40	0	1	0	2	0	43	0
DF	(England) Alan Bloor	37	2	1	0	2	0	40	2
DF	(England) Danny Bowers	13(2)	1	1	0	1(1)	0	15(3)	1
DF	(England) Alan Dodd	42	1	1	0	2	0	45	1
DF	(England) Paul Johnson	8	0	0	0	0	0	8	0
DF	(England) John Lumsdon	12(1)	0	0	0	0	0	12(1)	0
DF	(England) Jackie Marsh	16(1)	0	1	0	2	0	19(1)	0
DF	(England) Mike Pejic	21	0	0	0	2	0	23	0
DF	(England) Denis Smith	30	2	1	0	0	0	31	2
MF	(England) Brian Bithell	16(1)	0	1	0	0	0	17(1)	0
MF	(Republic of Ireland) Terry Conroy	34(2)	5	0	0	2	1	36(2)	6
MF	(England) Alan Hudson	11	0	0	0	2	0	13	0
MF	(Wales) John Mahoney	22	0	0	0	2	0	24	0
MF	(Scotland) Jimmy Robertson	14	0	1	0	0	0	15	0
MF	(England) Kevin Sheldon	7(2)	0	0	0	0	0	7(2)	0
MF	(England) Alan Suddick	9	1	0	0	0	0	9	1
MF	(England) John Tudor	28(2)	3	1	0	0	0	29(2)	3
MF	(England) Steve Waddington	11(1)	1	1	0	0	0	12(1)	1
FW	(England) Geoff Salmons	33(2)	1	1	0	2	0	36(2)	1
FW	(England) Garth Crooks	20(3)	6	0(1)	0	1(1)	0	21(5)	6
FW	(England) Dave Goodwin	12(1)	1	0	0	0	0	12(1)	1
FW	(England) Jimmy Greenhoff	14	2	0	0	2	1	16	3
FW	(England) John Ruggiero	9	2	0	0	0	0	9	2
FW	(England) Dennis Thorley	1	0	0	0	0	0	1	0
