= Jimmy Robertson (footballer, born 1944) =

Scottish footballer

Personal information
- Full name: James Gillen Robertson
- Date of birth: 17 December 1944 (age 81)
- Place of birth: Cardonald, Glasgow, Scotland
- Position: Right winger

Youth career
- Middlesbrough

Senior career*
Years	Team	Apps	(Gls)
1961–1962	Cowdenbeath	0	(0)
1962–1964	St Mirren	54	(12)
1964–1968	Tottenham Hotspur	157	(25)
1968–1970	Arsenal	46	(7)
1970–1972	Ipswich Town	87	(10)
1972–1977	Stoke City	114	(12)
1976–1977	Seattle Sounders	29	(3)
1977–1978	Walsall	16	(0)
1978–1979	Crewe Alexandra	33	(0)
Total		536	(69)

International career
1962	Scotland Amateurs	1	(0)
1964	Scotland	1	(0)
- * Club domestic league appearances and goals

James Gillen Robertson (born 17 December 1944) is a Scottish former professional footballer who played as a winger for Cowdenbeath, St Mirren, Tottenham Hotspur, Arsenal, Ipswich Town, Stoke City, Seattle Sounders, Walsall and Crewe Alexandra. He was capped once for Scotland.

== Club career ==
Robertson was born in Cardonald, Glasgow, and began his career playing as a right winger at English club Middlesbrough. He was not offered a professional contract at Middlesbrough, so returned to Scotland and joined up with Cowdenbeath. After his stint there he signed for St Mirren in 1962. With the "Buddies", Robertson made 54 appearances and scored 12 goals. After his spell with St. Mirren, Robertson was bought by Tottenham Hotspur in 1964 for £25,000. During the 1966–67 season he scored the first goal in Tottenham's 1967 FA Cup Final victory against Chelsea. With Spurs he made 181 appearances, including 4 as substitute, and scored 31 goals in all competitions.

He went on to join Spurs' rivals Arsenal in October 1968, in a straight swap for David Jenkins, making him one of the few players to play for both clubs. Robertson made his debut for Arsenal in a goalless draw against West Ham United in October 1968. Robertson played 19 league matches in the 1968–69 season. The following season he made a further 8 appearances, making 27 in all. He is one of only two players to score for both sides in the North London derby. In total Robertson played 59 games for Arsenal, scoring eight goals altogether.

Robertson then joined up with Ipswich Town in March 1970 for £50,000. At Portman Road he became a vital member of Bobby Robson's squad as Ipswich ensured survival in 1969–70 and 1970–71. During the 1971–72 season Robertson helped the club move up to a mid-table position. In July 1972 Robertson joined Stoke City for a fee of £80,000. At Stoke he became a regular under manager Tony Waddington in the 1972–73 and 1973–74 seasons. He suffered a broken leg while playing against Coventry City in December 1974. He then struggled to get back into the side and after two seasons without regular football he decided to leave for the Seattle Sounders of the North American Soccer League. He played 29 matches for the Seattle Sounders before returning to England to play for Walsall, and ended his playing days at Crewe Alexandra.

== International career ==
Robertson was capped by Scotland at both full and amateur level.

== Career statistics ==
=== Club ===
Appearances and goals by club, season and competition
Club	Season	League			National Cup		League Cup		Other^{[A]}		Total	
Club	Season	Division	Apps	Goals	Apps	Goals	Apps	Goals	Apps	Goals	Apps	Goals
St Mirren	1962–63	Scottish Division One	23	5	0	0	0	0	0	0	23	5
St Mirren	1963–64	Scottish Division One	29	9	0	0	0	0	0	0	29	9
St Mirren	Total		52	14	0	0	0	0	0	0	52	14
Tottenham Hotspur	1963–64	First Division	3	1	0	0	0	0	0	0	3	1
Tottenham Hotspur	1964–65	First Division	36	7	4	1	0	0	0	0	40	8
Tottenham Hotspur	1965–66	First Division	33	6	3	0	0	0	0	0	36	6
Tottenham Hotspur	1966–67	First Division	40	5	8	1	1	0	0	0	49	6
Tottenham Hotspur	1967–68	First Division	34	5	3	1	1	0	5	4	43	9
Tottenham Hotspur	1968–69	First Division	11	1	0	1	0	0	0	0	12	1
Tottenham Hotspur	Total		157	25	18	4	2	0	5	4	182	33
Arsenal	1968–69	First Division	19	3	2	1	0	0	0	0	21	4
Arsenal	1969–70	First Division	27	4	2	0	4	0	5	0	38	4
Arsenal	Total		46	7	4	1	4	0	5	0	59	8
Ipswich Town	1969–70	First Division	7	3	0	0	0	0	0	0	7	3
Ipswich Town	1970–71	First Division	40	5	6	1	2	0	0	0	48	7
Ipswich Town	1971–72	First Division	40	2	2	0	1	1	0	0	43	3
Ipswich Town	Total		87	10	8	1	3	1	0	0	98	13
Stoke City	1971–72	First Division	0	0	1	0	0	0	0	0	1	0
Stoke City	1972–73	First Division	31	5	1	0	3	0	2	0	37	5
Stoke City	1973–74	First Division	37	3	1	0	2	0	4	0	44	3
Stoke City	1974–75	First Division	14	3	0	0	4	2	2	0	20	5
Stoke City	1975–76	First Division	18	1	5	0	0	0	0	0	23	1
Stoke City	1976–77	First Division	14	0	1	0	0	0	0	0	15	0
Stoke City	Total		114	12	9	0	9	2	8	0	140	14
Seattle Sounders	1976	North American Soccer League	12	1	—		—		—		12	1
Seattle Sounders	1977	North American Soccer League	17	2	—		—		—		17	2
Seattle Sounders	Total		29	3	—		—		—		29	3
Walsall	1977–78	Third Division	16	0	2	0	2	0	0	0	20	0
Crewe Alexandra	1978–79	Fourth Division	33	0	2	0	1	0	0	0	36	0
Career total			534	71	43	6	21	3	18	4	616	84

A. The "Other" column constitutes appearances and goals in the Anglo-Scottish Cup, Football League play-offs, FA Charity Shield, Inter-Cities Fairs Cup, Texaco Cup, Football League Trophy, UEFA Cup, Watney Cup.

=== International ===
National team	Year	Apps	Goals
Scotland	1964	1	0
Total		1	0

== Honours ==
Tottenham Hotspur

- FA Cup: 1966–67
- FA Charity Shield: 1967 (shared)

Seattle Sounders

- NASL Soccer Bowl: (Runners Up Medal) 1977
