= Danny Bowers =

English footballer (born 1955)

Personal information
- Full name: Ian Bowers
- Date of birth: 16 January 1955 (age 71)
- Place of birth: Stoke-on-Trent, England
- Position: Defender

Senior career*
Years	Team	Apps	(Gls)
1974–1978	Stoke City	39	(2)
1977	→ Shrewsbury Town (loan)	6	(0)
1979–1984	Crewe Alexandra	175	(2)
Total		220	(4)
- * Club domestic league appearances and goals

Ian "Danny" Bowers (born 16 January 1955) is a former footballer who played in the Football League for Crewe Alexandra, Shrewsbury Town and Stoke City.

== Career ==
Bowers was born in Stoke-on-Trent and began his career with Stoke City after progressing through the youth and reserve ranks at the Victoria Ground. He was thrust into the first team by manager Tony Waddington in 1974–75 due to a number of injuries to Stoke's defence and he played in ten matches. He played nine times in 1975–76 and then played 16 times in 1976–77. That campaign however was a very poor one for Stoke as they were relegated to the Second Division. Bowers struggled to get back into the side thereafter and after a loan spell at Shrewsbury Town he joined Crewe Alexandra in August 1979, signed by former manager Waddington.

At the Alexandra Stadium Bowers became a regular under Waddington and then Arfon Griffiths and Peter Morris. He spent five seasons with the "Alex" making 191 appearances.

== Career statistics ==
Appearances and goals by club, season and competition
Club	Season	League			FA Cup		League Cup		Other^{[A]}		Total	
Club	Season	Division	Apps	Goals	Apps	Goals	Apps	Goals	Apps	Goals	Apps	Goals
Stoke City	1974–75	First Division	10	0	0	0	0	0	0	0	10	0
Stoke City	1975–76	First Division	7	1	2	0	0	0	0	0	9	1
Stoke City	1976–77	First Division	15	1	1	0	2	0	0	0	18	1
Stoke City	1977–78	Second Division	7	0	1	0	0	0	0	0	8	0
Stoke City	1978–79	Second Division	0	0	0	0	1	0	0	0	1	0
Stoke City	Total		39	2	4	0	3	0	0	0	46	2
Shrewsbury Town (loan)	1977–78	Third Division	6	0	0	0	0	0	0	0	6	0
Crewe Alexandra	1979–80	Fourth Division	45	0	1	0	2	0	0	0	48	0
Crewe Alexandra	1980–81	Fourth Division	45	2	1	0	2	0	0	0	48	2
Crewe Alexandra	1981–82	Fourth Division	18	0	2	0	1	0	0	0	21	0
Crewe Alexandra	1982–83	Fourth Division	46	0	1	0	2	0	0	0	48	0
Crewe Alexandra	1983–84	Fourth Division	21	0	0	0	2	1	2	0	25	1
Crewe Alexandra	Total		175	2	5	0	9	1	2	0	191	3
Career Total			220	4	9	0	12	1	2	0	243	5

A. The "Other" column constitutes appearances and goals in the Football League Trophy.
