= 1975–76 Stoke City F.C. season =

Stoke City
1975–76 season
- Chairman: Albert Henshall
- Manager: Tony Waddington
- Stadium: Victoria Ground; Vale Park
- Football League First Division: 12th (41 Points)
- FA Cup: Fifth Round
- League Cup: Second Round
- Top goalscorer: League: Jimmy Greenhoff & Ian Moores (11); All: Jimmy Greenhoff & Ian Moores (13)
- Highest home attendance: 32,092 vs Liverpool (26 December 1975)
- Lowest home attendance: 15,598 vs Norwich City (24 April 1976)
- Average home league attendance: 22,314
Home colours

The 1975–76 season was Stoke City's 69th season in the Football League and the 45th in the First Division.

After two very successful league campaigns there was high hopes for the 1975–76 season as Stoke looked to establish themselves amongst the best in the country. Their form was good and going into the new year Stoke were in the top half of the table and looking good. But disaster struck in January 1976 as winds of hurricane force battered Stoke-on-Trent and the Victoria Ground was badly damaged. The roof of the Butler Street stand collapsed and Stoke had to play a league match against Middlesbrough at nearby Vale Park whilst repair work was carried out. Results declined thereafter and Stoke took 12th position.

== Season review ==
=== League ===
There had been heavy transfer costs incurred in 1974–75 with the club recording a loss of £448,342 and therefore now in debt despite an increase in the average attendance. Geoff Hurst was sold to West Bromwich Albion for £20,000, the only outgoing transfer for cash in the summer of 1975, although two other notable departures were those of club record goalscorer John Ritchie who retired after finding the back of the net a record 176 times for the "Potters" and also goalkeeper John Farmer. Hopes were high again of a successful season, but Stoke stayed stubbornly in the middle of the division never threatening the top or bottom to the table.

After some good and bad results, on 2 January 1976 Stoke experienced perhaps their greatest misfortune. In a powerful storm which hit the Stoke-on-Trent area the Butler Street stand had part of its roof blown off by strong winds and the Victoria Ground was closed while repair work was carried out. Near neighbours Port Vale offered Stoke the use of Vale Park and on the one occasion they used it Middlesbrough were beaten 1–0 with Ian Moores scoring in front of 21,009. Stoke were allowed back home for their next match against Tottenham Hotspur in the FA Cup on 24 January. Stoke lost the momentum they had and finished the season in 12th spot. Eric Skeels left the club at the end of the season. Skeels is Stoke's all-time record appearance holder having made 592 appearances for the club in all competitions.

=== FA Cup ===
Stoke beat both Tottenham Hotspur and Manchester City before losing to Sunderland in a replay.

=== League Cup ===
Fourth Division Lincoln City caused a shock as they beat Stoke 2–1 at Sincil Bank.

== Final league table ==
Pos	Team	Pld	W	D	L	GF	GA	GAv	Pts
10	Norwich City	42	16	10	16	58	58	1.000	42
11	Everton	42	15	12	15	60	66	0.909	42
12	Stoke City	42	15	11	16	48	50	0.960	41
13	Middlesbrough	42	15	10	17	46	45	1.022	40
14	Coventry City	42	13	14	15	47	57	0.825	40

Source: World Football
Rules for classification: 1) Points; 2) Goal average; 3) Goals scored

== Results ==
Stoke's score comes first

=== Legend ===
Win	Draw	Loss

=== Football League First Division ===
Match	Date	Opponent	Venue	Result	Attendance	Scorers
1	16 August 1975	West Ham United	H	1–2	23,744	Moores 89'
2	20 August 1975	Wolverhampton Wanderers	H	2–2	22,551	Bowers 53', Conroy 57' (pen)
3	23 August 1975	Arsenal	A	1–0	28,025	Hudson 42'
4	27 August 1975	Leicester City	A	1–1	22,878	Hudson 3'
5	30 August 1975	Manchester United	H	0–1	23,337	
6	6 September 1975	Middlesbrough	A	0–3	20,975	
7	13 September 1975	Leeds United	H	3–2	23,139	Conroy 32', Pejic 40', Greenhoff 73'
8	20 September 1975	Coventry City	A	3–0	18,965	Greenhoff 44', Moores (2) 47', 77'
9	24 September 1975	Manchester City	A	0–1	28,915	
10	27 September 1975	Derby County	H	1–0	25,097	Greenhoff 11'
11	4 October 1975	Norwich City	A	1–0	22,318	Haslegrave 73'
12	11 October 1975	Ipswich Town	H	0–1	21,978	
13	18 October 1975	Sheffield United	A	2–0	23,410	Greenhoff (2) 75', 84'
14	25 October 1975	Newcastle United	H	1–1	24,057	Greenhoff 60'
15	1 November 1975	Burnley	A	1–0	18,269	Moores 55'
16	8 November 1975	Everton	H	3–2	24,651	Salmons 12', Robertson 80', Moores 81'
17	15 November 1975	Tottenham Hotspur	A	1–1	25,698	Moores 71'
18	22 November 1975	Sheffield United	H	2–1	21,959	Salmons (2) 20', 28' (1 pen)
19	29 November 1975	Queens Park Rangers	A	2–3	22,328	Moores 46', Bloor 55'
20	6 December 1975	Aston Villa	H	1–1	28,492	Greenhoff 22'
21	13 December 1975	Arsenal	H	2–1	18,628	Salmons 73', Greenhoff 80'
22	20 December 1975	West Ham United	A	1–3	21,135	Bloor 34'
23	26 December 1975	Liverpool	H	1–1	32,092	Salmons 52'
24	27 December 1975	Birmingham City	A	1–1	37,166	Moores 40'
25	10 January 1976	Leeds United	A	0–2	36,909	
26	17 January 1976	Middlesbrough	H	1–0	21,009	Moores 87'
27	31 January 1976	Wolverhampton Wanderers	A	1–2	24,190	Conroy 72'
28	7 February 1976	Leicester City	H	1–2	21,001	Moores 3'
29	21 February 1976	Tottenham Hotspur	H	1–2	17,113	Greenhoff 6'
30	3 March 1976	Newcastle United	A	1–0	37,459	Burns (o.g.) 19'
31	6 March 1976	Burnley	H	4–1	16,062	Smith (2) 18', 30', Greenhoff 25', Mahoney 75'
32	13 March 1976	Ipswich Town	A	1–1	22,812	Smith 83'
33	20 March 1976	Queens Park Rangers	H	0–1	22,848	
34	24 March 1976	Derby County	A	1–1	30,156	Bloor 2'
35	27 March 1976	Aston Villa	A	0–0	32,359	
36	2 April 1976	Manchester City	H	0–0	18,798	
37	7 April 1976	Everton	A	1–2	16,974	Greenhoff 59' (pen)
38	10 April 1976	Coventry City	H	0–1	16,059	
39	17 April 1976	Liverpool	A	3–5	44,069	Conroy 30', Moores 60', Bloor 89'
40	19 April 1976	Birmingham City	H	1–0	19,918	Gallagher 6' (o.g.)
41	21 April 1976	Manchester United	A	1–0	53,879	Bloor 87'
42	24 April 1976	Norwich City	H	0–2	15,598	

=== FA Cup ===
Round	Date	Opponent	Venue	Result	Attendance	Scorers
R3	3 January 1976	Tottenham Hotspur	A	1–1	26,715	Mahoney 31'
R3 Replay	24 January 1976	Tottenham Hotspur	H	2–1	29,520	Moores 35', Salmons 88' (pen)
R4	4 February 1976	Manchester City	H	1–0	38,073	Greenhoff 81'
R5	14 February 1976	Sunderland	H	0–0	41,171	
R5 Replay	17 February 1976	Sunderland	A	1–2	47,583	Smith 77'

=== League Cup ===
Round	Date	Opponent	Venue	Result	Attendance	Scorers
R2	10 September 1975	Lincoln City	A	1–2	13,472	Greenhoff 18'

=== Friendlies ===
Game	Opponent	Venue	Result
1	Pwllheli & District	A	7–1
2	Olympique de Marseille	A	0–0
3	AS Monaco	A	1–0
4	Cruzeiro	A	0–3
5	Atlético Madrid	A	0–0
6	Buxton	A	3–2
7	Stafford Rangers	A	2–0
8	Brighton & Hove Albion	A	1–1
9	Stockport County	A	2–2
10	Port Vale	A	1–1
11	RCD Espanyol	A	2–1

== Squad statistics ==
Pos.	Name	League		FA Cup		League Cup		Total	
Pos.	Name	Apps	Goals	Apps	Goals	Apps	Goals	Apps	Goals
GK	(England) Peter Shilton	42	0	5	0	1	0	48	0
DF	(England) Alan Bloor	32	5	4	0	1	0	37	5
DF	(England) Danny Bowers	6(1)	1	2	0	0	0	8(1)	1
DF	(England) Alan Dodd	39(1)	0	5	0	1	0	45(1)	0
DF	(England) Kevin Lewis	9	0	0	0	0	0	9	0
DF	(England) John Lumsdon	9(1)	0	0	0	0	0	9(1)	0
DF	(England) Jackie Marsh	25(1)	0	4	0	1	0	30(1)	0
DF	(England) Mike Pejic	39	1	2	0	1	0	42	1
DF	(England) Eric Skeels	4	0	0	0	0	0	4	0
DF	(England) Denis Smith	19	3	3	1	0	0	22	4
MF	(Republic of Ireland) Terry Conroy	16	4	1	0	1	0	18	4
MF	(England) Sean Haslegrave	23(5)	1	0	0	1	0	24(5)	1
MF	(England) Alan Hudson	34	2	5	0	1	0	40	2
MF	(Wales) John Mahoney	38	1	5	1	1	0	44	2
MF	(England) Kevin Sheldon	3	0	0	0	0	0	3	0
MF	(Scotland) Jimmy Robertson	12(6)	1	5	0	0	0	17(6)	1
FW	(England) Garth Crooks	2	0	0	0	0	0	2	0
FW	(England) Dave Goodwin	2(2)	0	0	0	0	0	2(2)	0
FW	(England) Jimmy Greenhoff	40	11	5	1	1	1	46	13
FW	(England) Ian Moores	29(3)	11	4(1)	1	1	0	34(4)	12
FW	(England) Geoff Salmons	39(1)	5	5	1	0	0	44(1)	6
–	Own goals	–	2	–	0	–	0	–	2
