= 1968–69 Stoke City F.C. season =

Stoke City
1968–69 season
- Chairman: Albert Henshall
- Manager: Tony Waddington
- Stadium: Victoria Ground
- Football League First Division: 19th (33 Points)
- FA Cup: Fifth Round
- League Cup: Second Round
- Top goalscorer: League: Peter Dobing (8); All: Peter Dobing (10)
- Highest home attendance: 30,630 vs Manchester United (23 November 1968)
- Lowest home attendance: 8,826 vs Sheffield Wednesday (22 April 1969)
- Average home league attendance: 18,984
Home colours

The 1968–69 season was Stoke City's 62nd season in the Football League and the 38th in the First Division.

Stoke failed to improve on last season's near miss and again were involved in a relegation scrap. Stoke won just nine matches all season and scored just 40 goals as they narrowly avoided relegation by three points.

== Season review ==
=== League ===
To address last season's lack of goals Waddington brought in Scottish international David Herd on a free transfer from Manchester United. There was tragedy in October 1968 as reserve team goalkeeper Paul Shardlow suffered a heart attack in a training match and died.

As the 1968–69 season began, once again Stoke found goals hard to come by, they only scored eight in their opening eleven league matches and although the feeling amongst the supporters was that the team was too good to be relegated they were lucky in the fact that Queens Park Rangers and Leicester City had poor seasons. Stoke could only manage 19th place in a very uneventful season which saw champions Leeds United gain revenge for last season by beating Stoke 5–1 at the Victoria Ground. It had been a nerve-racking season with Stoke seemingly involved in a relegation battle from the start, and thanks to some determined performances Stoke scrambled three points clear of the drop zone. The 1968–69 season did, however mark the debut of Denis Smith who was later to become club captain and would have a major impact on the club's fortunes during the 1970s.

At the end of the season in May 1969 Stoke City embarked on an end of season tour which saw them play against Congo Kinshasa (drew 1–1) and then on to Spain where they played against Catalonia giants Barcelona. The match was played in front of 65,000 at the Camp Nou and Stoke shocked the prestigious hosts with a 3–2 victory. David Herd scored twice and Harry Burrows hit a third to put Stoke into a 3–0 lead at half-time. Barcelona fought back scoring twice through Carles Rexach and Pedro Zabalza but a Stoke held on for a splendid victory.

=== FA Cup ===
After unspectacular wins over Fourth Division sides York City and Halifax Town, Stoke lost 3–2 away at Chelsea.

=== League Cup ===
Blackburn Rovers eliminated Stoke in a second round replay 1–0 after a 1–1 draw at Ewood Park, John Mahoney scoring for the "Potters".

== Final league table ==
Pos	Team	Pld	W	D	L	GF	GA	GAv	Pts	Qualification or relegation
17	Sunderland	42	11	12	19	43	67	0.642	34	
18	Nottingham Forest	42	10	13	19	45	57	0.789	33	
19	Stoke City	42	9	15	18	40	63	0.635	33	
20	Coventry City	42	10	11	21	46	64	0.719	31	
21	Leicester City (R)	42	9	12	21	39	68	0.574	30	Relegation to the Second Division

Source: World Football
Rules for classification: 1) Points; 2) Goal average; 3) Goals scored
(R) Relegated

== Results ==
Stoke's score comes first

=== Legend ===
Win	Draw	Loss

=== Football League First Division ===
Match	Date	Opponent	Venue	Result	Attendance	Scorers
1	10 August 1968	Sunderland	H	2–1	22,475	Dobing, Stevenson
2	14 August 1968	West Ham United	H	0–2	22,131	
3	17 August 1968	Leeds United	A	0–2	30,383	
4	20 August 1968	Liverpool	A	1–2	46,674	Conroy
5	24 August 1968	Leicester City	H	1–0	16,633	Mahoney
6	28 August 1968	Southampton	A	0–2	20,712	
7	31 August 1968	Wolverhampton Wanderers	A	1–1	31,034	Elder
8	7 September 1968	Manchester City	H	1–0	22,013	Conroy
9	14 September 1968	Arsenal	A	0–1	28,273	
10	21 September 1968	Queens Park Rangers	H	1–1	15,273	Skeels
11	28 September 1968	Ipswich Town	A	1–3	20,943	Dobing
12	5 October 1968	Nottingham Forest	A	3–3	21,510	Stevenson, Burrows, Herd
13	9 October 1968	Southampton	H	1–0	14,105	Allen
14	12 October 1968	Burnley	H	1–3	14,160	Mahoney
15	19 October 1968	Everton	A	1–2	42,887	Herd
16	26 October 1968	Chelsea	H	2–0	16,786	Herd, Dobing
17	2 November 1968	Tottenham Hotspur	A	1–1	33,309	Herd
18	9 November 1968	Coventry City	H	0–3	16,117	
19	16 November 1968	West Bromwich Albion	A	1–2	22,134	Dobing
20	23 November 1968	Manchester United	H	0–0	30,630	
21	30 November 1968	Sheffield Wednesday	A	1–2	23,027	Burrows
22	7 December 1968	Newcastle United	H	1–0	11,594	Herd
23	14 December 1968	Burnley	A	1–1	10,003	Herd
24	21 December 1968	Everton	H	0–0	20,491	
25	26 December 1968	Nottingham Forest	H	3–1	20,331	Dobing, Conroy, Eastham
26	11 January 1969	Tottenham Hotspur	H	1–1	21,728	Conroy
27	1 February 1969	West Bromwich Albion	H	1–1	20,567	Conroy
28	1 March 1969	Sunderland	A	1–4	16,092	Conroy
29	5 March 1969	Chelsea	A	0–1	19,856	
30	8 March 1969	Leeds United	H	1–5	24,327	Burrows (pen)
31	15 March 1969	Leicester City	A	0–0	24,987	
32	18 March 1969	Coventry City	A	1–1	25,097	Herd
33	22 March 1969	Wolverhampton Wanderers	H	4–1	19,574	Herd, Conroy, Dobing (2)
34	24 March 1969	Manchester United	A	1–1	39,931	Stevenson
35	29 March 1969	Manchester City	A	1–3	27,311	Marsh
36	5 April 1969	Ipswich Town	H	2–1	15,022	Herd, Dobing
37	7 April 1969	Liverpool	H	0–0	27,389	
38	8 April 1969	West Ham United	A	0–0	26,577	
39	12 April 1969	Queens Park Rangers	A	1–2	12,489	Hunt (o.g.)
40	19 April 1969	Arsenal	H	1–3	14,989	Burrows
41	22 April 1969	Sheffield Wednesday	H	1–1	8,826	Vernon
42	30 April 1969	Newcastle United	A	0–5	27,526	

=== FA Cup ===
Round	Date	Opponent	Venue	Result	Attendance	Scorers
R3	4 January 1969	York City	A	2–0	11,129	Burrows (2)
R4	25 February 1969	Halifax Town	H	1–1	30,283	Dobing
R4 Replay	28 February 1969	Halifax Town	A	3–0	24,981	Conroy (2), Burrows
R5	12 February 1969	Chelsea	A	2–3	39,191	Burrows, Dobing

=== League Cup ===
Round	Date	Opponent	Venue	Result	Attendance	Scorers
R2	4 September 1968	Blackburn Rovers	A	1–1	12,464	Mahoney
R2 Replay	11 September 1968	Blackburn Rovers	H	0–1	13,747	

=== Friendlies ===
Match	Opponent	Venue	Result
1	Oldham Athletic	A	3–1
2	Exeter City	A	1–0
3	Plymouth Argyle	A	1–0
4	Derby County	H	1–3
5	Blackpool	A	5–8
6	Congo Kinshasa	A	1–1
7	Granada	A	4–1
8	Pontevedra	A	0–2
9	Barcelona	A	3–2

== Squad statistics ==
Pos.	Name	League		FA Cup		League Cup		Total	
Pos.	Name	Apps	Goals	Apps	Goals	Apps	Goals	Apps	Goals
GK	(England) Gordon Banks	30	0	4	0	0	0	34	0
GK	(England) John Farmer	12	0	0	0	2	0	14	0
DF	(England) Tony Allen	17(3)	1	0	0	2	0	19(3)	1
DF	(England) Bill Bentley	3(1)	0	0	0	0	0	3(1)	0
DF	(England) Alan Bloor	29	0	4	0	2	0	35	0
DF	(Northern Ireland) Alex Elder	38	1	4	0	2	0	44	1
DF	(England) Tony Lacey	2(1)	0	0	0	1	0	3(1)	0
DF	(England) Jackie Marsh	28(2)	1	4	0	1	0	33(2)	1
DF	(England) Mike Pejic	1	0	0	0	0	0	1	0
DF	(England) Eric Skeels	35(1)	1	4	0	0(1)	0	39(2)	1
DF	(England) Denis Smith	14	0	0	0	0	0	14	0
MF	(England) Mike Bernard	21(3)	0	4	0	0	0	25(3)	0
MF	(England) Gerry Bridgwood	4(2)	0	0	0	1	0	5(2)	0
MF	(Republic of Ireland) Terry Conroy	30(1)	7	4	2	1	0	35(1)	9
MF	(England) George Eastham	26(1)	1	4	0	2	0	32(1)	1
MF	(Wales) John Mahoney	23(3)	2	0	0	2	1	25(3)	3
MF	(Scotland) Willie Stevenson	30(2)	3	0	0	2	0	32(2)	3
FW	(England) Harry Burrows	35	4	4	4	0	0	39	8
FW	(England) Peter Dobing	40	8	4	2	2	0	46	10
FW	(Scotland) David Herd	35	9	4	0	0	0	39	9
FW	(Wales) Roy Vernon	5(3)	1	0	0	2	0	7(3)	1
FW	(England) John Worsdale	4	0	0	0	0	0	4	0
–	Own goals	–	1	–	0	–	0	–	1
