= John Worsdale =

English footballer

Personal information
- Full name: John Worsdale
- Date of birth: 29 October 1948
- Place of birth: Stoke-on-Trent, England
- Date of death: 22 September 2017 (aged 68)
- Position: Right wing

Youth career
- 1966–1968: Stoke City

Senior career*
Years	Team	Apps	(Gls)
1968–1969	Stoke City	4	(0)
1970–1974	Lincoln City	67	(9)
–	Worksop Town		
Total		71	(9)
- * Club domestic league appearances and goals

John Worsdale (29 October 1948 – 22 September 2017) was a footballer who played in the Football League for Lincoln City and Stoke City.

== Career ==
Worsdale started his career at his local club Stoke City after coming through the youth ranks at the Victoria Ground. He made his professional debut for Stoke in an away match against Arsenal in September 1968. He made just three more appearances for the "Potters" during the 1968–69 season before being released at the end of it. He joined Lincoln City and spent four years with the "Imps" making 67 league appearances and scoring nine goals before dropping into non-league football with Worksop Town.

== Career statistics ==
John Worsdale at the English National Football Archive (subscription required)

Appearances and goals by club, season and competition
Club	Season	League			FA Cup		League Cup		Watney Cup		Total	
Club	Season	Division	Apps	Goals	Apps	Goals	Apps	Goals	Apps	Goals	Apps	Goals
Stoke City	1968–69	First Division	4	0	0	0	0	0	0	0	4	0
Lincoln City	1971–72	Fourth Division	21	5	1	0	1	0	1	0	24	5
Lincoln City	1972–73	Fourth Division	22	2	0	0	1	0	0	0	23	2
Lincoln City	1973–74	Fourth Division	24	2	0	0	1	0	0	0	25	2
Lincoln City	Total		67	9	1	0	3	0	1	0	72	9
Career total			71	9	1	0	3	0	1	0	76	9
