= John Ruggiero =

English footballer

Personal information
- Full name: John Salvatore Ruggiero
- Date of birth: 26 November 1954 (age 71)
- Place of birth: Stoke-on-Trent, England
- Position: Forward

Senior career*
Years	Team	Apps	(Gls)
1974–1977	Stoke City	9	(2)
1975–1976	→ Workington (loan)	3	(0)
1976	→ Cape Town City (loan)	19	(8)
1977–1978	Brighton & Hove Albion	8	(2)
1978	→ Portsmouth (loan)	6	(1)
1979–1980	Chester	12	(1)
–	Telford United		
Total		53	(14)
- * Club domestic league appearances and goals

John Salvatore Ruggiero (born 26 November 1954) is an English former footballer who played in the Football League for Brighton & Hove Albion, Chester, Portsmouth and Stoke City.

== Career ==
Ruggiero was born in Stoke-on-Trent to Italian parents and joined Stoke City when he was 19 in 1974, he went out on loan to Workington and Cape Town City. He was given a run in the first team towards the end of the 1976–77 season with the team struggling at the bottom of the First Division having had to sell their star players due to the Butler Street stand having to be rebuilt. Ruggiero scored twice against Coventry City but Stoke failed to avoid relegation and Ruggiero joined Brighton & Hove Albion. He then spent time with Portsmouth, Chester and Telford United.

== Career statistics ==
Appearances and goals by club, season and competition
Club	Season	League			FA Cup		League Cup		Total	
Club	Season	Division	Apps	Goals	Apps	Goals	Apps	Goals	Apps	Goals
Workington (loan)	1975–76	Fourth Division	3	0	0	0	0	0	3	0
Stoke City	1976–77	First Division	9	2	0	0	0	0	9	2
Brighton & Hove Albion	1977–78	Second Division	8	2	0	0	4	0	12	2
Portsmouth (loan)	1977–78	Third Division	6	1	0	0	0	0	6	1
Chester	1977–78	Third Division	12	1	0	0	3	0	15	1
Career total			38	6	0	0	7	0	45	6
