= Ian Moores =

English footballer

Personal information
- Full name: Ian Richard Moores
- Date of birth: 5 October 1954
- Place of birth: Chesterton, England
- Date of death: 12 January 1998 (aged 43)
- Position: Forward

Youth career
- Staffordshire County Boys' Team

Senior career*
| Years | Team | Apps | (Gls) |
| 1974–1976 | Stoke City | 50 | (15) |
| 1976–1978 | Tottenham Hotspur | 29 | (6) |
| 1977 | → Western Suburbs (loan) | 5 | (2) |
| 1978–1982 | Orient | 117 | (26) |
| 1982–1983 | Bolton Wanderers | 29 | (5) |
| 1983 | → Barnsley (loan) | 3 | (0) |
| 1983–1988 | APOEL | 119 | (39) |
| 1988–1989 | Tamworth | | |
| 1989 | Landskrona BoIS | 10 | (4) |
| Total | | 359 | (97) |

International career
| 1975 | England U-23 | 2 | (0) |
- * Club domestic league appearances and goals

Ian Richard Moores (5 October 1954 – 12 January 1998) was an English footballer who played in the Football League for Barnsley, Bolton Wanderers, Orient, Stoke City, Tottenham Hotspur F.C. and APOEL F.C. in Cyprus.

== Playing career ==
Moores was born in Chesterton, Staffordshire and learned to play his football for the Staffordshire County Boys' Team. Moores then joined Stoke City's youth team and as a schoolboy at the age of fifteen continued his development at the Victoria Ground. Moores started as a left winger but became a centre-forward after a switch in Stoke's "A" team with a hat-trick to his name in the second half of a match. He graduated to the senior team in April 1974, having appeared for the England under-23 team twice. He made his debut for Stoke away at Leicester City towards the end of the 1973–74 season and in 1974–75 he became a member of Tony Waddington's first team scoring four goals in 18 matches. He was joined top scorer with Jimmy Greenhoff in 1975–76 with 13 but with Stoke needing money he was sold to Tottenham Hotspur in August 1976.

He moved to Tottenham Hotspur in August 1976 for a £75,000 fee. Moores started off well, scoring on his debut during a League Cup tie at Middlesbrough on 31 August 1976 which Spurs won 2–1. On 4 September 1976 Moores made his Tottenham league debut at Old Trafford. Spurs trailed 2–0 at half-time, but second half strikes from Moores, Ralph Coates and John Pratt gave them a 3–2 win. However, he only scored twice more during the rest of that season, against Wrexham in the League Cup in September 1976 and against Sunderland in a 2–1 home defeat in November 1976. Spurs were relegated at the end of the season to Division Two.

During the following season Moores did not play until the 11th game of the season. He scored a hat-trick against Bristol Rovers on 22 October 1977, during which Colin Lee scored four in a record 9–0 win for Spurs at White Hart Lane. He played 12 more times that season and scored once more, against Crystal Palace three weeks later. In July 1978 the arrival of Ossie Ardiles and Ricardo Villa spelt the end for Moores at White Hart Lane. He provided a cross for Villa to score against Nottingham Forest but played only once again, in a 4–1 home defeat against Aston Villa, which was to be his final ever appearance for Spurs. In September 1978 he left the club to join Orient for a fee of £55,000 where he scored 26 goals in 117 league appearances. Moores scored twice on his debut for Orient, as he had done for Spurs, away against Charlton Athletic on 6 October 1978.

Moores was a first team regular over the next four years, but when Orient were relegated to Division 3 in 1982 he signed for Bolton Wanderers. Moores scored five goals in 29 appearances that season. Bolton were relegated, like Spurs and Orient had been before and in July 1983 he moved to APOEL in Cyprus, where he remained for five years and where he is still regarded as a legend. He played alongside Terry McDermott and won one Cypriot Championship, one Cup, two Super Cups and played in all three European competitions. Returning to England in 1988, Moores had an unsuccessful trial with Port Vale before heading into the non-leagues. He helped Tamworth win the 1989 FA Vase, when he scored in the replay of the final, but that was to be his swansong. He retired as a player a year later, in 1990.

== Personal life and post-retirement ==
His favourite player was his teammate, Jimmy Greenhoff. He cited his Under-23 national team debut vs Wales as his most memorable match. He had said that if he was not an athlete, he would have been a physical training instructor. His likes included television, driving and going to horse races.

After retiring from football, Moores worked in personal finance in his native Potteries, and when he fell ill in September 1997 with lung cancer, he was coaching a local under 16 team. Moores died in January 1998 at the age of 43.

== Career statistics ==
Appearances and goals by club, season and competition
| Club | Season | League | | | FA Cup | | League Cup | | Other^{[A]} | | Total | |
| Club | Season | Division | Apps | Goals | Apps | Goals | Apps | Goals | Apps | Goals | Apps | Goals |
|---|---|---|---|---|---|---|---|---|---|---|---|---|
| Stoke City | 1973–74 | First Division | 1 | 0 | 0 | 0 | 0 | 0 | 0 | 0 | 1 | 0 |
| Stoke City | 1974–75 | First Division | 17 | 4 | 0 | 0 | 1 | 0 | 0 | 0 | 18 | 4 |
| Stoke City | 1975–76 | First Division | 32 | 11 | 5 | 1 | 1 | 0 | 0 | 0 | 38 | 12 |
| Stoke City | Total | | 50 | 15 | 5 | 1 | 2 | 0 | 0 | 0 | 57 | 16 |
| Tottenham Hotspur | 1976–77 | First Division | 17 | 2 | 0 | 0 | 2 | 2 | 0 | 0 | 19 | 4 |
| Tottenham Hotspur | 1977–78 | Second Division | 10 | 4 | 0 | 0 | 1 | 0 | 0 | 0 | 11 | 4 |
| Tottenham Hotspur | 1978–79 | First Division | 2 | 0 | 0 | 0 | 0 | 0 | 0 | 0 | 2 | 0 |
| Tottenham Hotspur | Total | | 29 | 6 | 0 | 0 | 3 | 2 | 0 | 0 | 32 | 8 |
| Orient | 1978–79 | Second Division | 30 | 13 | 3 | 0 | 0 | 0 | 0 | 0 | 33 | 13 |
| Orient | 1979–80 | Second Division | 26 | 0 | 3 | 0 | 0 | 0 | 0 | 0 | 29 | 0 |
| Orient | 1980–81 | Second Division | 37 | 9 | 1 | 0 | 1 | 0 | 2 | 0 | 41 | 9 |
| Orient | 1981–82 | Second Division | 24 | 4 | 5 | 3 | 2 | 2 | 3 | 1 | 34 | 10 |
| Orient | Total | | 117 | 26 | 12 | 3 | 3 | 2 | 5 | 1 | 137 | 32 |
| Bolton Wanderers | 1982–83 | Second Division | 29 | 5 | 0 | 0 | 4 | 2 | 0 | 0 | 33 | 7 |
| Barnsley (loan) | 1982–83 | Second Division | 3 | 0 | 0 | 0 | 0 | 0 | 0 | 0 | 3 | 0 |
| Landskrona BoIS | 1989 | Division 1 Södra | 10 | 4 | — | | — | | 2 | 1 | 12 | 5 |
| Career total | | | 238 | 56 | 17 | 4 | 12 | 6 | 7 | 2 | 274 | 68 |

A. The "Other" column constitutes appearances and goals in the Anglo-Scottish Cup, Football League Group Cup and Svenska Cupen.
