= John Tudor (footballer) =

English footballer (1946–2025)

Personal information
- Full name: John Tudor
- Date of birth: 25 June 1946
- Place of birth: Ilkeston, England
- Date of death: 9 February 2025 (aged 78)
- Place of death: Minnetonka, Minnesota, U.S.
- Height: 5 ft 10 in (1.78 m)
- Position: Forward

Senior career*
Years	Team	Apps	(Gls)
1964–1966	Ilkeston Town	13	(2)
1966–1968	Coventry City	69	(13)
1968–1971	Sheffield United	71	(30)
1971–1976	Newcastle United	164	(53)
1976–1977	Stoke City	30	(3)
1977–1979	Gent	40	(16)
- Gateshead
Total		387	(117)
- * Club domestic league appearances and goals

John Tudor (25 June 1946 – 9 February 2025) was an English professional footballer who played for Coventry City, Newcastle United, Sheffield United and Stoke City. He also had a stint in Belgium with Gent towards the end of his career.

== Career ==
Tudor began his football career playing for his local team, Ilkeston Town before turning professional with Coventry City. He scored eight goals in 17 matches in 1966–67 helping the "Sky Blues" win the Second Division title. He was not as prolific for Coventry in the First Division and after scoring just seven more goals he left for Sheffield United. He rediscovered his goalscoring form at Bramall Lane scoring 33 goals in 78 appearances which helped the "Blades" on their way to promotion in 1970–71.

Tudor signed for Newcastle United in January 1971 and he developed a prolific partnership with Malcolm Macdonald. He scored a career best of 24 in 1972–73 helping the "Toon" win the Anglo-Italian Cup, and two Texaco Cups in the mid 1970s. He scored 14 goals in 1973–74 and 18 in 1974–75 before Gordon Lee became manager and Tudor lost his place. He joined Stoke City in September 1976 and made an impressive debut for the "Potters" scoring twice in a 2–1 victory over Ipswich Town at the Victoria Ground. However, he scored just once more in 1976–77 as Stoke suffered relegation. The following year he moved to Gent in Belgium and stayed two years, scoring 16 goals in 40 games for De Buffalos. He became a publican in Derbyshire and Northumberland, before moving to the US, where he was Director of Player Development at CC United Soccer Club in Minnesota. In 2012, he was inducted into the Minnesota Youth Soccer Association Hall of Fame. He lived in the US until his death in 2025.

== Death ==
Tudor died from complications of dementia on 9 February 2025 in Minnetonka, Minnesota. He was 78.

== Career statistics ==
Appearances and goals by club, season and competition
Club	Season	League			FA Cup		League Cup		Other (Note: Includes Anglo-Italian Cup, Anglo-Scottish Cup and Texaco Cup.)		Total	
Club	Season	Division	Apps	Goals	Apps	Goals	Apps	Goals	Apps	Goals	Apps	Goals
Coventry City	1966–67	Second Division	16	8	0	0	1	0	0	0	17	8
Coventry City	1967–68	First Division	36	4	3	0	0	0	0	0	39	4
Coventry City	1968–69	First Division	17	1	0	0	4	2	0	0	21	3
Coventry City	Total		69	13	3	0	5	2	0	0	77	15
Sheffield United	1968–69	Second Division	19	11	1	1	0	0	0	0	20	12
Sheffield United	1969–70	Second Division	29	10	0	0	3	2	0	0	32	12
Sheffield United	1970–71	Second Division	23	9	1	0	2	0	0	0	26	9
Sheffield United	Total		71	30	2	1	5	2	0	0	78	33
Newcastle United	1970–71	First Division	16	5	0	0	0	0	0	0	16	5
Newcastle United	1971–72	First Division	38	8	2	1	2	0	6	2	48	11
Newcastle United	1972–73	First Division	42	18	2	0	2	0	13	6	48	24
Newcastle United	1973–74	First Division	28	6	10	3	1	0	7	5	46	14
Newcastle United	1974–75	First Division	32	14	1	0	3	1	8	3	44	18
Newcastle United	1975–76	First Division	7	2	0	0	0	0	0	0	7	2
Newcastle United	1976–77	First Division	1	0	0	0	0	0	1	0	2	0
Newcastle United	Total		164	53	15	4	8	1	35	16	222	74
Stoke City	1976–77	First Division	30	3	1	0	0	0	0	0	31	3
Career total			334	99	21	5	18	5	35	16	408	125

== Honours ==
Coventry City

- Football League Second Division: 1966–67

Newcastle United

- Anglo-Italian Cup: 1973
- Texaco Cup: 1974, 1975
- FA Cup runner-up: 1973–74
