= 1974–75 Stoke City F.C. season =

Stoke City
1974–75 season
- Chairman: Albert Henshall
- Manager: Tony Waddington
- Stadium: Victoria Ground
- Football League First Division: 5th (49 Points)
- FA Cup: Third Round
- League Cup: Fourth Round
- UEFA Cup: First Round
- Top goalscorer: League: Jimmy Greenhoff (14); All: Jimmy Greenhoff (15)
- Highest home attendance: 45,954 vs Liverpool (31 March 1975)
- Lowest home attendance: 20,646 vs Luton Town (16 November 1974)
- Average home league attendance: 27,011
Home colours

The 1974–75 season was Stoke City's 68th season in the Football League and the 44th in the First Division.

Stoke back in European competition were handed a tough tie against Dutch giants Ajax. After a 1–1 draw at home Stoke dominated the second leg in Amsterdam but failed to find the back of the net and were knocked out on the away goals rule. In the league Stoke continued from where they left off the previous season in good form and for the first time since the 1946–47 season they were in the race for the First Division title. However, so were a number of other clubs, and with three matches left Stoke were third and on course for their best ever finish, but they took just a point in those games and finished in 5th position. There was a double blow for Stoke as they missed out on a UEFA Cup place after West Ham United won the FA Cup.

== Season review ==
=== League ===
Before the start of the 1974–75 season Stoke signed Sheffield United forward Geoff Salmons and lined up for the opening match a 3–0 win over Leeds United. Despite exiting Europe Stoke's form in the First Division remained good, but Tony Waddington was worried to a certain extent about his last line of defence and in November he surprisingly decided to break the club transfer record with the signing of Peter Shilton for £325,000 which at the time was also a world record transfer for a goalkeeper. Within ten days of Shilton's arrival Stoke sat at the top of the table after beating his old club Leicester City 1–0.

Stoke's progress in 1974–75, however was severely handicapped by a remarkable injury crisis, Already without Alan Bloor and John Ritchie, Jimmy Greenhoff broke his nose against Birmingham City and then Jimmy Robertson broke his leg against Coventry City on Boxing Day. Despite this Stoke kept on performing well and by February were again on top spot. A 2–2 draw at home to Wolverhampton Wanderers cost the team another broken leg, Mike Pejic which was followed by Denis Smith in the next home match against Ipswich Town. Yet Stoke still fought on with a reduced number of players, and after some fine results they lay in third with three games remaining If they won all three they would be champions of England for the first time. As it happened they failed to win any drawing twice and losing at Sheffield United and had to settle for fifth, four points behind champions Derby County. There was further disappointment for City as they lost out on a UEFA Cup place to Everton.

=== FA Cup ===
Stoke went down 2–0 against Liverpool in the third round.

=== League Cup ===
Stoke beat Third Division Halifax Town 3–0 before being paired with Chelsea. After two draws the tie went to a 2nd replay and thanks to two own goals Stoke recorded their biggest League Cup win, 6–2. But they were knocked out by Ipswich Town in the next round.

=== UEFA Cup ===
Stoke were also involved in the UEFA Cup and were paired with Dutch giants Ajax. In the first leg at the Victoria Ground Ajax dominated the match and went in front through star winger Ruud Krol. Stoke, despite being outplayed, managed to find an equaliser through Denis Smith. In the second leg it was a case of the roles being reversed: this time it was Stoke who dominated the match but couldn't find a way past Piet Schrijvers, with Stoke going out on the away-goal rule.

== Final league table ==
Pos	Team	Pld	W	D	L	GF	GA	GAv	Pts	Qualification or relegation
3	Ipswich Town	42	23	5	14	66	44	1.500	51	Qualification for the UEFA Cup first round
4	Everton	42	16	18	8	56	42	1.333	50	Qualification for the UEFA Cup first round
5	Stoke City	42	17	15	10	64	48	1.333	49	
6	Sheffield United	42	18	13	11	58	51	1.137	49	
7	Middlesbrough	42	18	12	12	54	40	1.350	48	

Source: World Football
Rules for classification: 1) Points; 2) Goal average; 3) Goals scored

== Results ==
Stoke's score comes first

=== Legend ===
Win	Draw	Loss

=== Football League First Division ===
Match	Date	Opponent	Venue	Result	Attendance	Scorers
1	17 August 1974	Leeds United	H	3–0	33,534	Mahoney 50', Greenhoff 85', Ritchie 87'
2	20 August 1974	Everton	A	1–2	35,817	Salmons 17'
3	24 August 1974	Queens Park Rangers	A	1–0	21,117	Hurst 86'
4	28 August 1974	Everton	H	1–1	27,594	Mahoney 75'
5	31 August 1974	Middlesbrough	H	1–1	23,484	Ritchie 17' (pen)
6	7 September 1974	Carlisle United	A	2–0	14,507	Hudson 5', Ritchie 58'
7	14 September 1974	Coventry City	H	2–0	22,482	Mahoney 59', Ritchie 84'
8	21 September 1974	Liverpool	A	0–3	51,423	
9	24 September 1974	Ipswich Town	A	1–3	24,470	Salmons 90'
10	28 September 1974	Derby County	H	1–1	23,589	Hurst 28'
11	5 October 1974	Sheffield United	H	3–2	21,796	Hurst 15', Greenhoff 38', Smith 57'
12	12 October 1974	Newcastle United	A	2–2	38,228	Salmons 25', Mahoney 63'
13	19 October 1974	Burnley	H	2–0	23,466	Marsh 13', Hurst 30'
14	26 October 1974	Chelsea	A	3–3	24,718	Greenhoff 13', Haslegrave 60', Robertson 85'
15	2 November 1974	Tottenham Hotspur	H	2–2	24,668	Salmons 8', Greenhoff 35'
16	9 November 1974	Manchester City	A	0–1	36,966	
17	16 November 1974	Luton Town	H	4–2	20,646	Hudson 3', Robertson 60', Greenhoff (2) 62', 68'
18	23 November 1974	Wolverhampton Wanderers	A	2–2	28,216	Salmons 10', Robertson 58'
19	27 November 1974	Queens Park Rangers	H	1–0	22,403	Hurst 9'
20	30 November 1974	Leicester City	H	1–0	29,793	Smith 86'
21	7 December 1974	Birmingham City	A	3–0	33,999	Greenhoff (2) 14', 36', Moores 29'
22	14 December 1974	Leeds United	A	1–3	34,685	Moores 89'
23	21 December 1974	Arsenal	H	0–2	23,292	
24	26 December 1974	Coventry City	A	0–2	22,345	
25	28 December 1974	West Ham United	H	2–1	33,498	Salmons 70' (pen), Hurst 76'
26	11 January 1975	Birmingham City	H	0–0	26,157	
27	18 January 1975	Leicester City	A	1–1	21,734	Hurst 57'
28	1 February 1975	Manchester City	H	4–0	32,007	Moores (2) 44', 84', Hudson 68', Hurst 87'
29	8 February 1975	Tottenham Hotspur	A	2–0	22,941	Greenhoff 23', Hudson 32'
30	15 February 1975	Wolverhampton Wanderers	H	2–2	30,611	Conroy 87', Skeels 88'
31	22 February 1975	Luton Town	A	0–0	19,894	
32	1 March 1975	Middlesbrough	A	0–2	25,766	
33	15 March 1975	Derby County	A	2–1	29,985	Greenhoff (2) 75', 89'
34	18 March 1975	Ipswich Town	H	1–2	28,589	Greenhoff 67'
35	22 March 1975	Carlisle United	H	5–2	20,525	Conroy (3) 8', 65', 73', Greenhoff 66', Salmons 88'
36	28 March 1975	West Ham United	A	2–2	29,811	Conroy (2) 40', 49'
37	29 March 1975	Arsenal	A	1–1	26,852	Salmons 33'
38	31 March 1975	Liverpool	H	2–0	45,954	Conroy (2) 20', 50' (1 pen)
39	5 April 1975	Chelsea	H	3–0	26,375	Conroy (2) 28', 87', Greenhoff 63'
40	12 April 1975	Sheffield United	A	0–2	33,255	
41	19 April 1975	Newcastle United	H	0–0	25,784	
42	26 April 1975	Burnley	A	0–0	19,191	

=== FA Cup ===
Round	Date	Opponent	Venue	Result	Attendance	Scorers
R3	4 January 1975	Liverpool	A	0–2	48,723	

=== League Cup ===
Round	Date	Opponent	Venue	Result	Attendance	Scorers
R2	11 September 1974	Halifax Town	H	3–0	17,805	Conroy (3) 42', 67, 71'
R3	9 October 1974	Chelsea	A	2–2	19,953	Robertson 6', Hurst 47'
R3 Replay	16 October 1974	Chelsea	H	1–1	24,376	Greenhoff 80'
R3 2nd Replay	22 October 1974	Chelsea	H	6–2	26,271	Hurst 2', 67', Smith 10', Droy 37' (o.g.), Harris 44' (o.g.), Salmons 62'
R4	12 November 1974	Ipswich Town	A	1–2	20,677	Robertson 90'

=== UEFA Cup ===
Round	Date	Opponent	Venue	Result	Attendance	Scorers
R1 1st leg	18 September 1974	Ajax	H	1–1	37,398	Smith 76'
R1 2nd leg	2 October 1974	Ajax	A	0–0	29,000	

Stoke eliminated on away goal rule

=== Friendlies ===
Match	Opponent	Venue	Result
1	AS Monaco	A	2–0
2	Rhyl	A	6–0
3	Blackburn Rovers	A	1–0
4	KV Turnhout	A	5–0
5	KV Mechelen	A	0–1
6	Preston North End	A	2–1
7	Stafford Rangers	A	3–2
8	Bristol Rovers	A	1–1
9	Derby County	A	1–4
10	Yeovil Town	A	2–2
11	Aston Villa	A	1–3
12	Morocco XI	A	3–1
13	Israel XI	A	0–4
14	Norway XI	A	2–0

== Squad statistics ==
Pos.	Name	League		FA Cup		League Cup		UEFA Cup		Total	
Pos.	Name	Apps	Goals	Apps	Goals	Apps	Goals	Apps	Goals	Apps	Goals
GK	(England) John Farmer	17	0	0	0	5	0	2	0	24	0
GK	(England) Peter Shilton	25	0	1	0	0	0	0	0	26	0
DF	(England) Alan Bloor	2	0	0	0	0	0	0	0	2	0
DF	(England) Danny Bowers	10	0	0	0	0	0	0	0	10	0
DF	(England) Alan Dodd	39	0	1	0	5	0	2	0	47	0
DF	(England) Kevin Lewis	5	0	0	0	1	0	0	0	6	0
DF	(England) Jackie Marsh	37(1)	1	1	0	4	0	2	0	44(1)	1
DF	(England) Mike Pejic	28	0	1	0	5	0	2	0	36	0
DF	(England) Eric Skeels	22(1)	1	0	0	0	0	0	0	22(1)	1
DF	(England) Denis Smith	30	2	1	0	5	1	2	1	38	4
MF	(Republic of Ireland) Terry Conroy	11(5)	10	1	0	2	3	1(1)	0	15(6)	13
MF	(England) Sean Haslegrave	18(1)	1	0	0	2(1)	0	2	0	22(2)	1
MF	(England) Alan Hudson	42	4	1	0	4	0	2	0	49	4
MF	(Wales) John Mahoney	39	4	1	0	5	0	2	0	47	4
MF	(Scotland) Jimmy Robertson	9(5)	3	0(1)	0	3	2	0(2)	0	12(8)	5
FW	(England) Jimmy Greenhoff	39	14	1	0	5	1	2	0	47	15
FW	(England) Geoff Hurst	30(5)	8	1	0	3	3	1	0	35(5)	11
FW	(England) Ian Moores	10(7)	4	0	0	1	0	0	0	11(7)	4
FW	(England) John Ritchie	7	4	0	0	0	0	0	0	7	4
FW	(England) Geoff Salmons	42	8	1	0	5	1	2	0	50	9
–	Own goals	–	0	–	0	–	2	–	0	–	2
