= Mike Pejic =

English footballer & manager (born 1950)

Personal information
- Full name: Michael Pejic
- Date of birth: 25 January 1950 (age 76)
- Place of birth: Chesterton, Staffordshire, England
- Height: 5 ft 7 in (1.70 m)
- Position: Left-back

Youth career
- 1964–1968: Stoke City

Senior career*
Years	Team	Apps	(Gls)
1968–1976	Stoke City	274	(6)
1976–1979	Everton	76	(2)
1979–1980	Aston Villa	10	(0)
Total		360	(8)

International career
1972–1973	England U-23	8	(0)
1974	England	4	(0)

Managerial career
- 1984–1985: Leek Town
- 1985–1986: Northwich Victoria
- 1994–1995: Chester City
- 1998: Leek Town (caretaker)
- 1999: Selangor
- * Club domestic league appearances and goals

Michael Pejic (born 25 January 1950) is an English former professional footballer who played as a left-back in the English Football League for Stoke City, Everton and Aston Villa, also representing England.

Pejic started his career with Stoke City under the management of Tony Waddington. He became an important player in Stoke's successful early 1970s side, helping the club win the League Cup in 1972. He was renowned for being a tough player and was prone to being sent off, and on one occasion was suspended for five matches. He broke his leg in February 1975, and in his absence, City's genuine First Division title challenge fell away. He was sold to Everton for a £135,000 fee in February 1977, where he played three seasons before joining Aston Villa in 1979. He retired due to injury in 1980.

He later managed Leek Town, Northwich Victoria, Chester City, and Malaysian side Selangor FA, and also coached Port Vale from 1986 to 1992. In the late 2000s, he coached at Plymouth Argyle and Ipswich Town.

== Club career ==
=== Stoke City ===
Pejic was born in Chesterton in Newcastle-under-Lyme on Wednesday, 25 January 1950, and supported Stoke City from an early age. His father, a Serbian immigrant miner from Yugoslavia, took him to watch the matches at the Victoria Ground. In his teenage years Pejic was playing for Newcastle-under-Lyme schools as a left-winger and signed professional forms with Stoke in 1967, where manager Tony Waddington decided to convert him into a left-back. After two years in the reserves he made his debut against West Ham United at Upton Park, helping Stoke keep a clean sheet against World Cup winner Geoff Hurst. He took over from the disappointing Alex Elder and established himself in the first-team. Pejic was a strong athlete with a sweet left foot and was compactly built at 5 ft 7in. Pejic was a 'hard player' and was a strong tackler who enjoyed letting his opposing winger know he was around with a scything tackle. He was a fitness fanatic who, unlike many of his Stoke teammates, had another job outside of football, as he kept a farm near Leek.

He became a regular in the Stoke squad in 1969–70 and the early seasons in the 1970s. Stoke enjoyed a successful period, reaching the semi-final of the FA Cup twice and winning their first major trophy – the League Cup – in 1972. He played the whole ninety minutes of the final, as the "Potters" beat Chelsea 2–1 at Wembley thanks to goals from Terry Conroy and George Eastham. During two seasons, 1970–71 and 1971–72, Pejic played in over 100 senior matches. He earned a call-up to the England national side in 1974, playing in four matches, but lost his place to Liverpool's Alec Lindsay. During his time at Stoke Pejic was prone to being sent off and was once suspended for five matches by the FA. He broke his leg in February 1975, and injuries to three other key players caused Stoke's bid for the First Division title in 1974–75 to fall away to a fifth-place finish. In January 1976, the Butler Street stand roof at the Victoria Ground collapsed after a powerful storm gripped the area. The club had to sell their most valuable players to cover the costs, and Pejic joined Everton for £135,000.

=== Everton ===
Under the stewardship of Gordon Lee, the "Toffees" finished in ninth place in 1976–77. They also reached the League Cup final but lost to Aston Villa at Old Trafford without Pejic in the team. He played 46 games in the 1977–78 season, as Everton finished third in the league. At Goodison Park, Pejic again suffered a broken leg, this time against Leeds United in December 1978 and was limited to 26 appearances in the 1978–79 season.

=== Aston Villa ===
He was replaced by John Bailey at Everton, and he joined Ron Saunders's Aston Villa in September 1979. But injuries again took their toll, and he was limited to 12 appearances in the 1979–80 season before he decided to retire at Villa Park in May 1980 after being sidelined with a pelvic injury. The months of injuries and early retirement left him suffering from depression.

== International career ==
Pejic won eight caps for the England under-23 team. Alf Ramsey handed him his full England debut in a friendly against Portugal in Lisbon on 3 April 1974; the game finished 0–0. After appearances against Wales and Northern Ireland, he won his fourth and final cap on 18 May 1974, in a 2–0 defeat to Scotland at Hampden Park that left England to share the 1973–74 British Home Championship. Ramsey's successor, Joe Mercer, dropped him in favour of Alec Lindsay.

== Coaching career ==
=== Leek Town manager ===
Pejic took charge at North West Counties League side Leek Town and led the "Blues" to a ninth-place finish in 1984–85. His stay at Harrison Park was brief, as he resigned to take over as manager of Northwich Victoria. He took the "Vics" to a 16th-place finish in the Alliance Premier League in 1985–86. He also ran a fruit and veg business.

=== Port Vale coach ===
He was appointed youth team coach at Port Vale in July 1986, being promoted to first-team coach in December 1987. He helped manager John Rudge to lead the club to promotion in 1988–89. However, he was sacked in March 1992, twelve months later an employment tribunal ruled that he had been unfairly dismissed and Vale were forced to pay a four-figure compensation sum.

When I moved up to coach the first team I was still doing the youth team, the reserves, the goalkeeping coaching and also the centre of excellence along with Neil Baker and Richard O'Kelly. It was a seven-day-a-week job, so it's fair to say I was heavily involved. I also introduced a fitness programme and worked really hard with the first team on dividing them into units and concentrating on their jobs in each third of the pitch. There were a few argie-bargies at first, but they accepted what I was doing and all worked really hard at it.

— Pejic worked hard at Vale Park, but chairman Bill Bell had a tendency to undermine Rudge by sacking his assistants.

=== Chester City manager ===
Pejic was named Chester City manager in June 1994 after the shock resignation of Graham Barrow. He inherited a very bare side after the loss of several key players, and an immediate relegation back to the Third Division was inevitable after the side began the 1994–95 season without a point from their first seven games. Pejic was sacked in January 1995 after a 4–0 thrashing by York City at the Deva Stadium. He returned to Leek Town as caretaker manager in 1998, before the appointment of Ernie Moss.

=== Later career ===
He went on to be the regional director for the North East FA and has coached such stars as Jermain Defoe, Aaron Lennon and Stewart Downing. He then taught FA coaching courses at NWHC in Nuneaton. In 1999, he managed Malaysian side Selangor FA. He also coached in Zimbabwe and Kuwait. In February 2007, he became Head of Youth Coaching at Championship side Plymouth Argyle. In June 2010 he left Argyle to take up a similar position at Ipswich Town. On 14 November 2010, Pejic was suspended from his coaching role at Ipswich Town after allegations of bullying.

== Taekwondo career ==
He took up the martial art of taekwondo at 62 and earned a place in the national team for the over-60 age group. In April 2019, he became the over 65's Taekwondo European champion after winning the gold medal in Antalya, Turkey.

== Personal life ==
Pejic married in December 1970 and again in April 1991. He married his third wife, Marilyn – younger sister of singer Jackie Trent, in August 2017. His younger brother, Mel, played for Stoke City, Hereford United and Wrexham. Shaun Pejic, the son of Mel and nephew of Mike, was in the Wales under-21 team. Pejic worked as a co-commentator on Stoke City matches for a local radio station, Signal 1. He also writes a column about Stoke in the Saturday edition of The Sentinel.

== Career statistics ==
=== Club ===
Appearances and goals by club, season and competition
Club	Season	League			FA Cup		League Cup		Other		Total	
Club	Season	Division	Apps	Goals	Apps	Goals	Apps	Goals	Apps	Goals	Apps	Goals
Stoke City	1968–69	First Division	1	0	0	0	0	0	—		1	0
Stoke City	1969–70	First Division	32	1	3	0	0	0	—		35	1
Stoke City	1970–71	First Division	42	0	10	0	2	0	6 (Note: Four appearances in Anglo-Italian Cup and two in Texaco Cup)	0	60	0
Stoke City	1971–72	First Division	32	0	4	0	12	0	4 (Note: One appearance in Anglo-Italian Cup and three in Texaco Cup)	0	52	0
Stoke City	1972–73	First Division	38	2	1	0	3	0	2 (Note: Appearances in UEFA Cup)	0	44	2
Stoke City	1973–74	First Division	41	2	1	0	4	2	5 (Note: Two appearances in Texaco Cup and three appearances and one goal in Watney Cup)	1	51	5
Stoke City	1974–75	First Division	28	0	1	0	5	0	2	0	36	0
Stoke City	1975–76	First Division	39	1	2	0	1	0	—		42	1
Stoke City	1976–77	First Division	21	0	2	0	0	0	—		23	0
Stoke City	Total		274	6	24	0	27	2	19	1	344	9
Everton	1976–77	First Division	17	1	4	0	0	0	—		21	1
Everton	1977–78	First Division	40	1	2	0	4	0	—		46	1
Everton	1978–79	First Division	19	0	0	0	3	0	4	0	26	0
Everton	Total		76	2	6	0	7	0	4	0	93	2
Aston Villa	1979–80	First Division	10	0	0	0	2	0	—		12	0
Career total			360	8	30	0	36	2	23	1	449	11

=== International ===
Appearances and goals by national team and year
National team	Year	Apps	Goals
England	1974	4	0
Total		4	0

== Honours ==
Stoke City

- Football League Cup: 1971–72
- Watney Cup: 1974

England

- British Home Championship: 1973–74 (shared)
