= John Mahoney (footballer) =

Welsh footballer and manager

Personal information
- Full name: John Francis Mahoney
- Date of birth: 20 September 1946 (age 80)
- Place of birth: Cardiff, Wales
- Position: Midfielder

Youth career
- 1964: Ashton United

Senior career*
Years	Team	Apps	(Gls)
1965–1967	Crewe Alexandra	18	(5)
1967–1977	Stoke City	282	(25)
1967	→ Cleveland Stokers (loan)	12	(0)
1977–1979	Middlesbrough	77	(1)
1979–1983	Swansea City	110	(1)
Total		499	(32)

International career
1967–1983	Wales	51	(1)

Managerial career
- 1984–1986: Bangor City
- 1988–1989: Newport County
- 1989–1992: Bangor City
- 1996–1998: Carmarthen Town
- * Club domestic league appearances and goals

John Francis Mahoney (born 20 September 1946) is a Welsh former international footballer who played as a midfielder between the 1960s and 1980s for Crewe Alexandra, Middlesbrough, Stoke City and Swansea City. He attained 51 caps for Wales.

== Career ==
Mahoney was born in Cardiff and grew up in Manchester as his father played Rugby league with Oldham R.L.F.C. Mahoney began playing non-league football with Ashton United before signing for Crewe Alexandra in March 1966. With Liverpool showing a big interest in Mahoney, Crewe's former Stoke player Johnny King recommended him to Stoke manager Tony Waddington and he duly took his advice and signed him for £19,500 in March 1967. A rough diamond at first, Mahoney regularly lost possession by 'over-elaborate dribbling'. Waddington taught him the art of pass and move and he became a quality midfielder sitting just in front of his defence his task was to win the ball back and play in his wingers or forwards. Due to competition for places he was subject of a £50,000 offer from Millwall in February 1972 but rejected the chance to move to London. His patience was rewarded with a substitute appearance in the 1972 Football League Cup Final as Stoke beat Chelsea 2–1.

Sensing that Mahoney had matured into the player he wanted him to be Waddington sold his major rival for a place in Stoke's midfield, Mike Bernard, to Everton for £140,000 in May 1972. He developed a fine understanding with Alan Hudson which saw a strong Stoke side nearly win the league title in 1974–75. In January 1976 a severe storm in Stoke-on-Trent caused considerable damage to the Victoria Ground and in order to pay for the repairs the club sold off their players. This meant that Stoke struggled in 1976–77 and were relegated to the Second Division. Mahoney joined Middlesbrough in August 1977 for £90,000. "I didn't want to leave but when I looked at the fixture list and Stoke were away at Mansfield and Middlesbrough at home to Liverpool, I knew I had to go." He spent two seasons at Ayresome Park making 90 appearances helping "Boro" to two mid-table finishes. He then moved on to Swansea City with whom helped gain promotion in 1980–81 and finish 6th in their first season in the top-flight. But Swansea suffered relegation in 1982–83 and Mahoney's career was ended on 1 March 1983 in a match against Brighton & Hove Albion he was on the receiving end of a crushing tackle which left him with a permanent limp.

After leaving Swansea City, he became player-manager at Bangor City. With the "Citizens" Mahoney took them into the 1985–86 European Cup Winners' Cup beating Norwegians Fredrikstad FK and losing a respectable 3–0 to Atlético Madrid. He then spent a short time at the reformed Newport County before an unsuccessful three years back to Bangor. He later coached Carmarthen Town.

== International career ==
Whilst at Stoke Mahoney gained his first international cap for Wales, with a debut against England on 21 October 1967. However, it took him five years to win his first four caps, but by 1973 he had become a regular in the Welsh side, and in total he went on to make 51 appearances for his country. His final game was also against England in a British Home Championship match on 23 February 1983.

== Career statistics ==
=== Club ===
Appearances and goals by club, season and competition
Club	Season	League			FA Cup		League Cup		Other		Total	
Club	Season	Division	Apps	Goals	Apps	Goals	Apps	Goals	Apps	Goals	Apps	Goals
Crewe Alexandra	1965–66	Fourth Division	1	1	0	0	0	0	—		1	1
Crewe Alexandra	1966–67	Fourth Division	17	4	4	1	1	0	—		22	5
Crewe Alexandra	Total		18	5	4	1	1	0	—		23	6
Stoke City	1966–67	First Division	11	3	0	0	0	0	—		11	3
Stoke City	1967–68	First Division	28	6	2	0	2	0	—		32	6
Stoke City	1968–69	First Division	26	2	0	0	2	1	—		28	3
Stoke City	1969–70	First Division	2	0	0	0	0	0	—		2	0
Stoke City	1970–71	First Division	18	0	4	0	0	0	4 (Note: Appearances in Anglo-Italian Cup)	0	26	0
Stoke City	1971–72	First Division	29	4	2	0	6	0	3 (Note: Appearances in Texaco Cup)	1	40	5
Stoke City	1972–73	First Division	34	2	1	0	2	0	2 (Note: Appearances in UEFA Cup)	0	39	2
Stoke City	1973–74	First Division	35	3	1	0	4	0	4 (Note: One appearances in Texaco Cup and three appearances in Watney Cup)	0	44	3
Stoke City	1974–75	First Division	39	4	1	0	5	0	2	0	47	4
Stoke City	1975–76	First Division	38	1	5	1	1	0	—		44	2
Stoke City	1976–77	First Division	22	0	0	0	2	0	—		24	0
Stoke City	Total		282	25	16	1	24	1	15	1	337	28
Cleveland Stokers (loan)	1967	United Soccer Association	12	0	—		—		—		12	0
Middlesbrough	1977–78	First Division	37	1	5	1	4	0	—		46	2
Middlesbrough	1978–79	First Division	40	0	2	0	2	0	—		44	0
Middlesbrough	Total		77	1	7	1	6	0	—		90	2
Swansea City	1979–80	Second Division	26	1	2	0	4	1	—		32	2
Swansea City	1980–81	Second Division	35	0	1	0	1	0	—		37	0
Swansea City	1981–82	First Division	25	0	1	0	1	0	1 (Note: Appearance in European Cup Winners' Cup)	0	28	0
Swansea City	1982–83	First Division	24	0	1	0	3	0	3	0	31	0
Swansea City	Total		110	1	5	0	9	1	4	0	128	2
Career total			499	32	32	3	40	2	19	1	590	38

=== International ===
National team	Year	Apps	Goals
Wales	1967	1	0
Wales	1969	1	0
Wales	1971	1	0
Wales	1972	1	0
Wales	1973	6	0
Wales	1974	6	0
Wales	1975	6	1
Wales	1976	5	0
Wales	1977	8	0
Wales	1978	4	0
Wales	1979	8	0
Wales	1981	2	0
Wales	1982	1	0
Wales	1983	1	0
Total		51	1

== Honours ==
Stoke City

- Football League Cup: 1971–72

Swansea City

- Football League Second Division third-place promotion: 1980–81
