= 1971–72 Football League Cup =

Football League Cup
Tournament details
- Country: England; Wales
- Teams: 92

Final positions
- Champions: Stoke City (1st title)
- Runners-up: Chelsea

Tournament statistics
- Top goal scorer: Martin Chivers (7 goals)

The 1971–72 Football League Cup was the 12th season of the Football League Cup, a knock-out competition for England's top 92 football clubs. The tournament started on 17 August 1971 and ended with the final at Wembley on 4 March 1972. Stoke City won the tournament after defeating Chelsea in the final at Wembley Stadium, London. Entry for all football league clubs became compulsory this season.

== Calendar ==
Of the 92 teams, 36 received a bye to the second round (teams ranked 1st–36th in the 1970–71 Football League) and the other 56 played in the first round. Semi-finals were two-legged.

Round	Main date	Fixtures		Clubs	New entries this round
Round	Main date	Original	Replays	Clubs	New entries this round
First Round	18 August 1971	28	10	92 → 64	56 (teams ranked 15th–22nd in Second Division; all Third and Fourth Division)
Second Round	8 September 1971	32	4	64 → 32	36 (teams ranked 1st–14th in Second Division; all First Division)
Third Round	6 October 1971	16	7	32 → 16	none
Fourth Round	26/27 October 1971	8	7	16 → 8	none
Fifth Round	17 November 1971	4	0	8 → 4	none
Semi-finals	December 1971 – January 1972	4	2	4 → 2	none
Final	4 March 1972	1	0	2 → 1	none

== First round ==
=== Ties ===
Home team	Score	Away team	Date
Aldershot	1–1	Southend United	18 August 1971
Aston Villa	2–2	Wrexham	18 August 1971
Barnsley	0–0	Hartlepool	18 August 1971
Barrow	0–2	Preston North End	18 August 1971
Blackburn Rovers	2–0	Workington	18 August 1971
Bournemouth	2–1	Portsmouth	17 August 1971
Bradford City	1–1	Bolton Wanderers	18 August 1971
Charlton Athletic	5–1	Peterborough United	17 August 1971
Chesterfield	0–0	Mansfield Town	18 August 1971
Colchester United	3–1	Brentford	18 August 1971
Crewe Alexandra	0–1	Southport	18 August 1971
Darlington	0–1	York City	18 August 1971
Exeter City	0–3	Bristol Rovers	18 August 1971
Fulham	4–0	Cambridge United	17 August 1971
Gillingham	4–0	Reading	18 August 1971
Grimsby Town	4–3	Doncaster Rovers	17 August 1971
Halifax Town	1–1	Rochdale	18 August 1971
Orient	1–1	Notts County	17 August 1971
Newport County	1–2	Torquay United	17 August 1971
Oldham Athletic	1–0	Bury	17 August 1971
Plymouth Argyle	1–0	Bristol City	17 August 1971
Port Vale	0–2	Shrewsbury Town	18 August 1971
Rotherham United	0–2	Sheffield Wednesday	17 August 1971
Scunthorpe United	0–1	Lincoln City	18 August 1971
Stockport County	1–0	Walsall	18 August 1971
Swansea City	0–1	Brighton & Hove Albion	17 August 1971
Tranmere Rovers	1–1	Chester	18 August 1971
Watford	2–0	Northampton Town	18 August 1971

=== Replays ===
Home team	Score	Away team	Date
Bolton Wanderers	2–1	Bradford City	25 August 1971
Chester	1–3	Tranmere Rovers	25 August 1971
Hartlepool	0–1	Barnsley	23 August 1971
Mansfield Town	0–5	Chesterfield	23 August 1971
Notts County	3–1	Orient	25 August 1971
Rochdale	2–2	Halifax Town	24 August 1971
Southend United	1–2	Aldershot	23 August 1971
Wrexham	1–1	Aston Villa	23 August 1971

=== 2nd Replays ===
Home team	Score	Away team	Date
Aston Villa	4–3	Wrexham	31 August 1971
Halifax Town	2–0	Rochdale	31 August 1971

== Second round ==
=== Ties ===
Home team	Score	Away team	Date
Arsenal	1–0	Barnsley	8 September 1971
Bristol Rovers	3–1	Sunderland	7 September 1971
Blackburn Rovers	0–0	Lincoln City	8 September 1971
Bournemouth	0–2	Blackpool	8 September 1971
Carlisle United	5–0	Sheffield Wednesday	7 September 1971
Charlton Athletic	3–1	Leicester City	7 September 1971
Coventry City	0–1	Burnley	7 September 1971
Crystal Palace	2–0	Luton Town	7 September 1971
Chelsea	2–0	Plymouth Argyle	8 September 1971
Chesterfield	2–3	Aston Villa	8 September 1971
Colchester United	4–1	Swindon Town	8 September 1971
Derby County	0–0	Leeds United	8 September 1971
Grimsby Town	2–1	Shrewsbury Town	7 September 1971
Huddersfield Town	0–2	Bolton Wanderers	7 September 1971
Ipswich Town	1–3	Manchester United	7 September 1971
Liverpool	3–0	Hull City	7 September 1971
Manchester City	4–3	Wolverhampton Wanderers	8 September 1971
Newcastle United	2–1	Halifax Town	8 September 1971
Norwich City	2–0	Brighton & Hove Albion	8 September 1971
Nottingham Forest	5–1	Aldershot	7 September 1971
Notts County	1–2	Gillingham	8 September 1971
Oxford United	1–0	Millwall	8 September 1971
Queens Park Rangers	2–0	Birmingham City	7 September 1971
Sheffield United	3–0	Fulham	7 September 1971
Southampton	2–1	Everton	7 September 1971
Southport	1–2	Stoke City	8 September 1971
Stockport County	0–1	Watford	7 September 1971
Torquay United	2–1	Oldham Athletic	8 September 1971
Tranmere Rovers	0–1	Preston North End	8 September 1971
West Bromwich Albion	0–1	Tottenham Hotspur	8 September 1971
West Ham United	1–1	Cardiff City	8 September 1971
York City	2–2	Middlesbrough	8 September 1971

=== Replays ===
Home team	Score	Away team	Date
Cardiff City	1–2	West Ham United	22 September 1971
Leeds United	2–0	Derby County	27 September 1971
Lincoln City	4–1	Blackburn Rovers	15 September 1971
Middlesbrough	1–2	York City	14 September 1971

== Third round ==
=== Ties ===
Home team	Score	Away team	Date
Arsenal	4–0	Newcastle United	6 October 1971
Blackpool	4–0	Colchester United	5 October 1971
Bolton Wanderers	3–0	Manchester City	5 October 1971
Bristol Rovers	2–1	Charlton Athletic	5 October 1971
Crystal Palace	2–2	Aston Villa	5 October 1971
Gillingham	1–1	Grimsby Town	6 October 1971
Liverpool	1–0	Southampton	5 October 1971
Manchester United	1–1	Burnley	6 October 1971
Norwich City	4–1	Carlisle United	6 October 1971
Nottingham Forest	1–1	Chelsea	6 October 1971
Oxford United	1–1	Stoke City	6 October 1971
Queens Park Rangers	4–2	Lincoln City	5 October 1971
Sheffield United	3–2	York City	5 October 1971
Torquay United	1–4	Tottenham Hotspur	6 October 1971
Watford	1–1	Preston North End	6 October 1971
West Ham United	0–0	Leeds United	6 October 1971

=== Replays ===
Home team	Score	Away team	Date
Aston Villa	2–0	Crystal Palace	13 October 1971
Burnley	0–1	Manchester United	18 October 1971
Chelsea	2–1	Nottingham Forest	11 October 1971
Grimsby Town	1–0	Gillingham	12 October 1971
Leeds United	0–1	West Ham United	20 October 1971
Preston North End	2–1	Watford	11 October 1971
Stoke City	2–0	Oxford United	18 October 1971

== Fourth round ==
=== Ties ===
Home team	Score	Away team	Date
Arsenal	0–0	Sheffield United	26 October 1971
Blackpool	4–1	Aston Villa	26 October 1971
Chelsea	1–1	Bolton Wanderers	27 October 1971
Grimsby Town	1–1	Norwich City	26 October 1971
Manchester United	1–1	Stoke City	27 October 1971
Queens Park Rangers	1–1	Bristol Rovers	26 October 1971
Tottenham Hotspur	1–1	Preston North End	27 October 1971
West Ham United	2–1	Liverpool	27 October 1971

=== Replays ===
Home team	Score	Away team	Date
Bolton Wanderers	0–6	Chelsea	8 November 1971
Bristol Rovers	1–0	Queens Park Rangers	2 November 1971
Norwich City	3–1	Grimsby Town	3 November 1971
Preston North End	1–2	Tottenham Hotspur	8 November 1971
Sheffield United	2–0	Arsenal	8 November 1971
Stoke City	0–0	Manchester United	8 November 1971

=== 2nd Replay ===
Home team	Score	Away team	Date
Stoke City	2–1	Manchester United	15 November 1971

== Fifth Round ==
=== Ties ===
Home team	Score	Away team	Date
Bristol Rovers	2–4	Stoke City	23 November 1971
Norwich City	0–1	Chelsea	17 November 1971
Tottenham Hotspur	2–0	Blackpool	17 November 1971
West Ham United	5–0	Sheffield United	17 November 1971

== Semi-finals ==
=== First leg ===
Home team	Score	Away team	Date
Stoke City	1–2	West Ham United	8 December 1971
Chelsea	3–2	Tottenham Hotspur	22 December 1971

=== Second leg ===
Home team	Score	Away team	Date	Agg
West Ham United	0–1	Stoke City	15 December 1971	2–2
Tottenham Hotspur	2–2	Chelsea	5 January 1972	4–5

=== Replay ===
	Score		Date	Venue
Stoke City	0–0	West Ham United	5 January 1972	Hillsborough, Sheffield

=== 2nd Replay ===
	Score		Date	Venue
Stoke City	3–2	West Ham United	26 January 1972	Old Trafford, Manchester

== Final ==
The final was held at Wembley Stadium, London on 4 March 1972.

4 March 1972

Stoke City	2–1	Chelsea
Conroy 5'; Eastham 67'		Osgood 45'

Wembley Stadium, London
Attendance: 97,852
Referee: N. Burtenshaw

STOKE CITY:
GK	1	Gordon Banks
DF	2	John Marsh
DF	3	Mike Pejic
MF	4	Mike Bernard
DF	5	Denis Smith
DF	6	Alan Bloor
MF	7	Terry Conroy
MF	8	Jimmy Greenhoff	Substituted off
FW	9	John Ritchie
FW	10	Peter Dobing
MF	11	George Eastham
Substitutes:
MF	12	John Mahoney	Substituted on
Manager:
Tony Waddington

CHELSEA:
GK	1	Peter Bonetti
DF	2	Paddy Mulligan	Substituted off
DF	3	Ron Harris (c)
MF	4	John Hollins
DF	5	John Dempsey
DF	6	David Webb
MF	7	Charlie Cooke
FW	8	Chris Garland
FW	9	Peter Osgood
MF	10	Alan Hudson
MF	11	Peter Houseman
Substitutes:
FW	12	Tommy Baldwin	Substituted on
Manager:
Dave Sexton
