= Geoff Salmons =

English footballer

Personal information
- Full name: Geoffrey Salmons
- Date of birth: 14 January 1948 (age 78)
- Place of birth: Mexborough, England
- Position: Winger

Senior career*
Years	Team	Apps	(Gls)
1966–1974	Sheffield United	180	(8)
1974–1977	Stoke City	118	(14)
1977	→ Sheffield United (loan)	5	(0)
1977–1978	Leicester City	26	(4)
1978–1981	Chesterfield	120	(15)
- Gainsborough Trinity
Total		449	(41)
- * Club domestic league appearances and goals

Geoffrey Salmons (born 14 January 1948) is an English former footballer who played for Chesterfield, Leicester City, Sheffield United and Stoke City as a midfielder.

== Career ==
Salmons was born in Mexborough and joined Sheffield United as a schoolboy and made his league debut at West Bromwich Albion on 30 September 1967. He became a regular starter under manager John Harris at the end of the 1960s and played 31 times in 1970–71 helping the "Blades" gain promotion to the First Division. Salmons and Sheffield United adapted to life in the top tier well finishing in mid table three consecutive seasons. After making 204 appearances for the Bramall Lane side he moved to Stoke City for a fee of £160,000. Salmons' first season at the Victoria Ground saw Stoke come within four points of winning the title and play Ajax in the UEFA Cup. In January 1976 a severe storm in Stoke-on-Trent saw the Victoria Ground badly damaged and as a result the club had to sell their players to fund the repair costs.

A weakened Stoke side were relegated in 1976–77 and Salmons re-joined Sheffield United on loan, playing five matches before signing for Leicester City for £45,000. He spent one season at Filbert Street scoring four goals in 28 matches before leaving for Chesterfield. He spent four seasons with the "Spireites" scoring 19 goals in 153 appearances helping them to win the Anglo-Scottish Cup in 1981 1980–81. He later played for non-league Gainsborough Trinity and after he ended his playing career he went on to run his own pub in his native Mexborough.

== Career statistics ==
Appearances and goals by club, season and competition
Club	Season	League			FA Cup		League Cup		Other^{[A]}		Total	
Club	Season	Division	Apps	Goals	Apps	Goals	Apps	Goals	Apps	Goals	Apps	Goals
Sheffield United	1966–67	First Division	0	0	0	0	1	0	0	0	1	0
Sheffield United	1967–68	First Division	2	0	0	0	0	0	0	0	2	0
Sheffield United	1968–69	Second Division	12	1	0	0	0	0	0	0	12	1
Sheffield United	1969–70	Second Division	25	2	2	0	3	0	0	0	30	2
Sheffield United	1970–71	Second Division	29	1	1	0	1	0	0	0	31	1
Sheffield United	1971–72	First Division	42	2	1	0	5	0	0	0	48	2
Sheffield United	1972–73	First Division	29	2	2	0	1	0	3	0	35	2
Sheffield United	1973–74	First Division	41	2	1	1	1	0	2	0	45	3
Sheffield United	Total		180	8	7	1	12	0	5	0	204	9
Stoke City	1974–75	First Division	42	8	1	0	5	1	2	0	50	9
Stoke City	1975–76	First Division	40	5	5	1	0	0	0	0	45	6
Stoke City	1976–77	First Division	35	1	1	0	2	0	0	0	38	1
Stoke City	1977–78	Second Division	1	0	0	0	0	0	0	0	1	0
Stoke City	Total		118	14	7	1	7	1	2	0	134	16
Sheffield United (loan)	1977–78	Second Division	5	0	0	0	0	0	0	0	5	0
Leicester City	1977–78	First Division	26	4	2	0	0	0	0	0	28	4
Chesterfield	1978–79	Third Division	37	5	1	0	3	0	0	0	41	5
Chesterfield	1979–80	Third Division	46	7	2	1	5	0	0	0	53	8
Chesterfield	1980–81	Third Division	33	3	6	1	4	0	9	2	52	6
Chesterfield	1981–82	Third Division	4	0	1	0	0	0	2	0	7	0
Chesterfield	Total		120	15	10	2	12	0	11	2	153	19
Career total			449	41	26	4	31	1	18	2	524	48

A. The "Other" column constitutes appearances and goals in the Anglo-Scottish Cup, Football League Group Cup, Texaco Cup, UEFA Cup and Watney Cup.
