= Jimmy Greenhoff =

English footballer (born 1946)

Personal information
- Full name: James Greenhoff
- Date of birth: 19 June 1946 (age 80)
- Place of birth: Barnsley, England
- Height: 5 ft 10 in (1.78 m)
- Position: Forward

Youth career
- 1961–1963: Leeds United

Senior career*
Years	Team	Apps	(Gls)
1963–1968	Leeds United	94	(21)
1968–1969	Birmingham City	31	(14)
1969–1976	Stoke City	274	(76)
1976–1980	Manchester United	97	(26)
1980–1981	Crewe Alexandra	11	(4)
1981	Toronto Blizzard	24	(6)
1981–1983	Port Vale	48	(5)
1983–1984	Rochdale	16	(0)
Total		595	(152)

International career
1968–1976	England U23	5	(1)

Managerial career
- 1983–1984: Rochdale (player-manager)
- * Club domestic league appearances and goals

James Greenhoff (born 19 June 1946) is an English former footballer. He was a skilful forward but, although capped five times at under-23 level (being on one of those occasions an over-age player), he never played for the full side and is labelled as the finest English player never to play for England. He made nearly 600 appearances in league football. His younger brother Brian was also a professional footballer.

Greenhoff began his career at Leeds United in 1963, at the time that the club sought promotion from the Second Division in 1963–64; Leeds went on to be First Division runners-up in 1964–65 and 1965–66. He also played in the 1967 and 1968 Inter-Cities Fairs Cup finals. He won both the Inter-Cities Fairs Cup and League Cup in 1968 before he was sold to Birmingham City. In 1969, he made a £100,000 move to Stoke City. He won the League Cup with Stoke in 1972 and also lifted the Watney Cup in 1973. He was moved on to Manchester United in 1976 and lifted both the FA Cup and Charity Shield in 1977. He was switched to Crewe Alexandra in December 1980 before joining Port Vale via Toronto Blizzard in August 1981. He was appointed player-manager at Rochdale in March 1983 before he resigned in March 1984.

== Career ==
=== Leeds United ===
Greenhoff was born in Barnsley. He started his career as an apprentice with Leeds United in June 1961, having impressed in the centre-half position for Barnsley Schoolboys. He was coached by Syd Owen. He turned professional at the club in August 1963, and made his senior debut as a 16-year-old. Leeds finished the 1963–64 season as champions of the Second Division under Don Revie's stewardship. The "Peacocks" then went on to finish 1964–65 as First Division runners-up, with champions and hated rivals Manchester United finishing above them on goal average. Leeds again finished second in 1965–66, six points behind champions Liverpool; however, Greenhoff missed much of the season with an ankle injury and a head injury sustained from a car crash. They then finished fourth in 1966–67, five points off the summit; Revie began to convert Greenhoff from a winger into a centre-forward. He turned out against Dinamo Zagreb at Elland Road in the second leg of the 1967 Inter-Cities Fairs Cup final, a goalless draw, Leeds lost the tie 2–0 on aggregate.

Once again, they finished fourth in the First Division in 1967–68, five points behind champions Manchester City. Greenhoff played 37 games, including a memorable 7–0 victory over rivals Chelsea on 7 October. He went on to appear in the League Cup final in 1968 after recovering from a knee injury; United beat Arsenal 1–0 thanks to a 20 yards (18 m) strike from Terry Cooper. Greenhoff went on to score four of Leeds' 16 goals past minnows CA Spora Luxembourg in the 1967–68 instalment of the Inter-Cities Fairs Cup. He also appeared as a half-time substitute in the first leg of the final, a 1–0 home win over Ferencvárosi TC, which was enough to secure Leeds the trophy after a goalless draw in Budapest. Greenhoff played a total of 136 games for Leeds in league and cup, scoring 36 goals.

=== Birmingham City ===
He was bought by Birmingham City manager Stan Cullis in August 1968, who paid the Yorkshire club a £70,000 fee. The transfer came as a surprise to many Leeds fans. Greenhoff made a huge impact at Birmingham, scoring 15 goals in 36 games (in all competitions) as the "Blues" finished 1968–69 seventh in the Second Division. During the campaign he scored four goals in a 5–4 win over Fulham at St Andrew's on 5 October. Despite this, Cullis told him he was not scoring enough goals.

"All I wanted to do was entertain the wonderful fans. Make them go away thinking 'God, that was brilliant'. They were a big part of my game. So warm."

— Greenhoff became an idol to Stoke fans second only to Stanley Matthews, and the feeling was mutual.

=== Stoke City ===
In August 1969, he left Birmingham for Tony Waddington's Stoke City in a deal worth £100,000, which was a club record for Stoke. He made the switch despite late interest from Everton. He hit nine goals in 37 games in 1969–70, a tally beaten by strike partners Harry Burrows and John Ritchie. He slotted in seamlessly in the team, connecting Ritchie with the midfield by feeding off Ritchie's knock-downs and bringing the wide players into the game. In 1970–71 he hit ten goals in 43 games, appearing in Stoke's FA Cup semi-final defeat to eventual winners Arsenal. He missed an easy chance that would have put Stoke 3–0 ahead, and in an interview in 2011 he said the miss "still gets to me".

He played for the "Potters" at Wembley against Chelsea in the 1972 Football League Cup final, which ended in a 2–1 win for Stoke – the only major trophy in the club's history. He also helped the club to the FA Cup semi-finals in 1972, his goal at Old Trafford cancelling out George Best's effort and earning Stoke a replay, which they won. The win over Manchester United left Stoke again facing Arsenal in the semi-finals. A 1–1 draw at Villa Park led to a replay at Goodison Park; Greenhoff scored for City in the replay, but Arsenal won the game 2–1 after John Radford scored from a clear offside position. Former club Leeds beat the "Gunners" in the final. He played 54 games in 1971–72, scoring 16 goals, two fewer than John Ritchie.

He scored twenty goals in 46 appearances in 1972–73, making him the club's top-scorer. These goals included a hat-trick at home to Manchester City on 23 September and a brace against City at Maine Road in a 3–2 defeat in the FA Cup. He hit ten goals in 44 games in 1973–74, not including his brace against Hull City in the final of the Watney Cup at the Victoria Ground. Greenhoff then began to play to the best of his abilities with the arrival of Alan Hudson. He scored 15 goals in 47 games in 1974–75, making him the club's top-scorer for a second time after he outscored Terry Conroy and Geoff Hurst by two and four goals respectively. A volley against former club Birmingham in December 1974 was voted ITV's goal of the season. He hit 13 goals in 46 games in 1975–76, making him the club's joint-top scorer along with Ian Moores. England manager Don Revie picked Greenhoff to play against Wales in March 1976, but he was unable to play due to it clashing with a league fixture and never got another chance at international level.

After three goals in 16 games in 1976–77, he was sold to Tommy Docherty's Manchester United in November 1976 for £120,000; with Stoke needing the money to pay a bill for £250,000 to repair the Victoria Ground following a powerful wind-storm. Though Docherty intended him to play alongside Stuart Pearson, the move also meant that he would play alongside his brother, Brian Greenhoff. He scored 97 goals for Stoke in 338 league and cup starts, putting him ninth in the club's overall goalscoring charts. A legend at the club, many Stoke fans consider him to be the greatest England player never to win a senior cap.

=== Manchester United ===
He scored twelve goals in 34 games for United in 1976–77, bagging a hat-trick against Newcastle United on 19 February. However, he greatest contribution would be in the FA Cup. He scored both United's goals in a 2–1 win over Southampton in a Fifth round replay before he put the "Red Devils" into the final by scoring past former club Leeds in a 2–1 semi-final victory at Hillsborough. He then went on to score the winner in the final after getting in the way of Lou Macari's wayward shot; in doing so he denied opponents and bitter rivals Liverpool the treble.

He appeared in the 1977 FA Charity Shield, which ended as a goalless draw, leaving Manchester United and Liverpool to share the shield. Greenhoff finished the 1977–78 campaign with six goals in 28 games. He finished 1978–79 as the club's top-scorer with 17 goals, and supporters voted him Player of the Year. He also played in the 1979 FA Cup final, which Arsenal won 3–2 thanks to a last-minute Alan Sunderland goal. Though this was as close as manager Dave Sexton would come to a major honour as United boss, Sexton did sign Joe Jordan, who would form a successful partnership with Greenhoff. United finished second in 1979–80, two points behind Liverpool, as Greenhoff was limited to just five games due to injury. He played twelve games in 1980–81.

=== Later career ===
He was allowed to join Crewe Alexandra in December 1980. Greenhoff had scored a total of 36 goals in 123 appearances (including four substitute appearances) for Manchester United. He was reunited with former boss Tony Waddington, and though Crewe were a struggling Fourth Division side, Greenhoff managed four goals in eleven league games. He moved to North American Soccer League side Toronto Blizzard in March 1981, then led by Keith Eddy. The "Blizzard" were a poor side and finished bottom of their division, despite Greenhoff scoring six goals in 24 games.

He returned to Stoke-on-Trent to sign a two-year contract with Port Vale in August 1981. He played 38 games in 1981–82, but scored just three goals for the Fourth Division side as manager John McGrath played him out of position on the left. Greenhoff struck twice in 17 games in 1982–83. Notably, on 6 November, local paper The Sentinel reported a "Heavy defeat for Port Vale" after Vale were 3–0 down to Rochdale at Spotland at half-time, only for Greenhoff to inspire a fightback for the "Valiants", and help the club to a 3–3 draw. On 3 January, he scored a volley from 30 yards (27 m) out in a 2–1 win over York City at Vale Park. York manager and former Stoke teammate Denis Smith said that "it was a world-class goal".

He joined Rochdale in March 1983, where he was appointed player-manager. He played 17 games for the "Dale" but did not find the net. Under his management, the club avoided the re-election zone in 1982–83 but again struggled in 1983–84, and he left the club in March 1984, later returning to Vale Park for a brief spell as a coach and assistant manager under John Rudge.

== Style of play ==
Greenhoff could play with both feet and was known for his runs into the opposition penalty area. He was a skilful player who had positional strength and a strong volley. He liked to play "no-look" passes.

== Post-retirement ==
Greenhoff suffered a financial crisis following a failed insurance venture and took up work in a warehouse. The crisis came about after discovering that his friend and business partner of nine years had been conning him out of large sums of money.

== Career statistics ==
=== Playing statistics ===
Appearance and goals by club, season and competition
Club	Season	League			FA Cup		League Cup		Europe		Other		Total	
Club	Season	Division	Apps	Goals	Apps	Goals	Apps	Goals	Apps	Goals	Apps	Goals	Apps	Goals
Leeds United	1962–63	Second Division	2	0	0	0	0	0	—		—		2	0
Leeds United	1963–64	Second Division	2	0	0	0	1	0	—		—		3	0
Leeds United	1964–65	First Division	9	2	1	1	1	0	—		—		11	3
Leeds United	1965–66	First Division	12	1	1	1	0	0	3 (Note: Appearances in Inter-Cities Fairs Cup)	0	—		16	2
Leeds United	1966–67	First Division	29	7	6	0	3	1	4	2	—		42	10
Leeds United	1967–68	First Division	37	11	3	0	7	3	11	4	—		58	18
Leeds United	1968–69	First Division	3	0	0	0	0	0	1	0	—		4	0
Leeds United	Total		94	21	11	2	12	4	19	6	0	0	136	33
Birmingham City	1968–69	Second Division	31	14	5	1	0	0	—		—		36	15
Stoke City	1969–70	First Division	33	9	3	0	1	0	—		—		37	9
Stoke City	1970–71	First Division	33	7	8	3	2	0	—		5 (Note: Three appearances and goal in Anglo-Italian Cup and two appearances in Texaco Cup)	1	48	11
Stoke City	1971–72	First Division	35	8	7	5	12	3	—		5 (Note: Three appearances and two goals in Anglo-Italian Cup and two appearances and one goal in Texaco Cup)	3	59	19
Stoke City	1972–73	First Division	41	16	1	2	2	2	2 (Note: Appearances in UEFA Cup)	0	0	0	46	20
Stoke City	1973–74	First Division	39	9	1	0	4	1	—		3 (Note: One appearance in Texaco Cup and two appearances and three goals in Watney Cup)	3	47	13
Stoke City	1974–75	First Division	39	14	1	0	5	1	2	0	0	0	47	15
Stoke City	1975–76	First Division	40	11	5	1	1	1	—		—		46	13
Stoke City	1976–77	First Division	14	2	0	0	2	1	—		—		16	3
Stoke City	Total		274	76	26	11	29	9	4	0	13	7	346	103
Manchester United	1976–77	First Division	27	8	7	4	0	0	0	0	0	0	34	12
Manchester United	1977–78	First Division	23	6	3	0	0	0	1 (Note: Appearance in European Cup Winners' Cup)	0	1 (Note: Appearance in FA Charity Shield)	0	28	6
Manchester United	1978–79	First Division	33	11	9	5	2	1	0	0	0	0	44	17
Manchester United	1979–80	First Division	5	1	0	0	0	0	0	0	0	0	5	1
Manchester United	1980–81	First Division	9	0	0	0	2	0	1	0	0	0	12	0
Manchester United	Total		97	26	19	9	4	1	2	0	1	0	123	36
Crewe Alexandra	1980–81	Fourth Division	11	4	0	0	0	0	—		—		11	4
Toronto Blizzard	1981	North American Soccer League	24	6	—		—		—		—		24	6
Port Vale	1981–82	Fourth Division	33	3	4	0	2	0	—		—		39	3
Port Vale	1982–83	Fourth Division	15	2	1	0	1	0	—		—		17	2
Port Vale	Total		48	5	5	0	3	0	0	0	0	0	56	5
Rochdale	1982–83	Fourth Division	12	0	0	0	0	0	—		—		12	0
Rochdale	1983–84	Fourth Division	4	0	0	0	1	0	—		—		5	0
Rochdale	Total		16	0	0	0	1	0	0	0	0	0	17	0
Career total			595	152	66	23	49	14	25	6	14	7	749	202

=== Managerial statistics ===
Managerial record by team and tenure
Team	From	To	Record				
Team	From	To	P	W	D	L	Win %
Rochdale	1 March 1983	12 March 1984	49	11	17	21	22.4
Total			49	11	17	21	22.4

== Honours ==
Leeds United

- Football League Cup: 1967–68
- Inter-Cities Fairs Cup: 1967–68

Stoke City

- Football League Cup: 1971–72
- Watney Cup: 1973

Manchester United

- FA Cup: 1976–77; runner-up: 1978–79
- FA Charity Shield: 1977 (shared)
