= Alan Hudson =

English footballer

Personal information
- Full name: Alan Anthony Hudson
- Date of birth: 21 June 1951 (age 75)
- Place of birth: Chelsea, London, England
- Height: 5 ft 10 in (1.78 m)
- Position: Midfielder

Youth career
- Chelsea

Senior career*
Years	Team	Apps	(Gls)
1969–1974	Chelsea	145	(10)
1974–1976	Stoke City	105	(9)
1976–1978	Arsenal	36	(0)
1979–1983	Seattle Sounders	94	(2)
1979–1980	→ Cleveland Force (indoor)	13	(6)
1981–1982	→ Seattle Sounders (indoor)	18	(12)
1983–1984	Chelsea	0	(0)
1984–1985	Stoke City	39	(0)
Total		450	(39)

International career
1970–1976	England U23	9	(0)
1975	England	2	(0)
- * Club domestic league appearances and goals

Alan Anthony Hudson (born 21 June 1951) is an English former footballer who played for Arsenal, Chelsea, Stoke City and the Seattle Sounders as well as the England national football team.

== Club career ==
=== Chelsea ===
Born and brought up near the King's Road, Hudson was initially rejected by the club he supported as a boy, Fulham, before signing schoolboy terms with Chelsea. Injury denied him the chance to become Chelsea's youngest-ever player, aged 16, and he eventually made his senior debut nine months later on 1 February 1969 in a 5–0 loss against Southampton. Hudson found himself in a Chelsea side noted for its flair and skill, complete with equally flamboyant footballers such as Peter Osgood and Charlie Cooke. It was during the 1969–70 season that he established himself as the team's creative playmaker, in the midfield of a 4–2–4 formation alongside the more defensive John Hollins, creating goal opportunities for Osgood and Ian Hutchinson, and enabling Chelsea to finish 3rd in the First Division.

Hudson played in every match in Chelsea's run to the FA Cup final in 1970, but then missed the final itself due to another injury when they beat Leeds United 2–1 in a replay at Old Trafford, having drawn 2–2 at Wembley. He did, however, play a major role in Chelsea's replayed European Cup Winners' Cup final win against Real Madrid in Athens a year later. Chelsea lost 2–1 to Stoke City in the 1972 League Cup final at Wembley, before which he sang with the rest of the squad on the club's 1972 record Blue Is the Colour, which peaked at number five on the UK Singles Chart. The club's debt burden caused by the building of a new East Stand at Chelsea resulted in the failure to replace key players, and a spiral of decline began. At the same time a falling-out with manager Dave Sexton resulted in both Hudson and Osgood being placed on the transfer list in January 1974. Within a month, Hudson had joined Stoke City for a then club record of £240,000.

=== Stoke City ===
Stoke manager Tony Waddington saw Hudson as the final piece of the jigsaw that would turn Stoke City into genuine championship challengers in 1975. Hudson's debut for Stoke against Liverpool on 19 January 1974 was described by former Wolverhampton Wanderers manager Stan Cullis, commentating on radio, as the finest debut performance he had ever seen. Allowed a free rein by Waddington, Hudson combined brilliantly with Jimmy Greenhoff and their form sparked a run of only two defeats in 19 games at the end of the 1973–74 season. Manager Waddington described Stoke's style of play at the time as 'the working man's ballet', a title which Hudson used for his autobiography in 1997. Off the pitch Hudson was a regular drinker, often staying at nightclubs until the early hours of the morning and even opening his own club in Newcastle-under-Lyme. He was enjoying the form of his career at Stoke and in his first two years at the Victoria Ground he missed only one game out of 162, and helped Stoke set a club record 23 home games undefeated from December 1973 to December 1974. Stoke almost won their first league title in 1974–75 finishing four points off Derby County in top spot. Hudson then played 40 times in 1975–76. In January 1976 a strong storm caused considerable damage to Stoke's Victoria Ground, and to pay for the expensive repair costs they had to sell off their playing staff and, in December 1976, Hudson was sold to Arsenal for £200,000.

=== Arsenal ===
He helped Arsenal reach the 1978 FA Cup Final, playing at Wembley Stadium in the final which they lost 1–0 to Ipswich Town; but fitness issues and personal differences with the Arsenal manager Terry Neill meant that he made only 36 appearances over his two seasons at Arsenal before he was sold to Seattle Sounders of the NASL for £100,000. He was 27 years of age. He had previously been linked to Spanish side Alicante in November 1977, with a reported £200,000 deal on the table.

=== Later career ===
In the autumn of 1978, Hudson signed with the Cleveland Force of the Major Indoor Soccer League. He returned briefly to Chelsea on a non-contract basis when John Neal signed him in August 1983. Hudson played for the Chelsea Reserves (in the Football Combination League) but partly due to illness and injury he never played in the first-team.

He re-joined Stoke City for £22,500 in January 1984 after Bill Asprey had consulted Waddington on how to help Stoke avoid relegation in 1983–84. Stoke picked up 33 points in 17 games and clinched survival with a 4–0 win over Wolverhampton Wanderers on the final day of the season but in 1984–85 were relegated with a record low points tally. Hudson was named captain by Mick Mills for the 1985–86 season but a knee injury forced him to retire in September 1985.

== International career ==
Hudson won nine caps for the England U23 team. He had initially made his debut against Scotland U23 at Roker Park on 4 March 1970, but the game was abandoned due to snow after 62 minutes. He therefore went on to make his first full debut for the under-23 team on 2 December 1970, in a 0–0 draw with Wales U23 at the Racecourse Ground.

Owing to a ban from international football after refusing to tour with the England under-23 side, Hudson did not make his England debut until 1975, when sparkling performances earned him two call-ups by then England manager Don Revie. He starred in the team that beat 1974 FIFA World Cup champions West Germany 2–0 at Wembley, and then in the 5–0 destruction of Cyprus. However, injuries and clashes with Revie meant that those two caps were the only ones he earned. He was called up as a late replacement by Ron Greenwood in 1978 for a match against Brazil. Hudson refused to join up as he was not in the original squad.

== Later life ==
His son, Anthony, is also a former professional footballer and manager.

Since his retirement, Hudson has suffered a series of personal setbacks. He had problems with alcoholism and was also declared bankrupt. In December 1997, Hudson suffered multiple injuries when run over by a car while walking along a London street. He spent two months in a coma and the doctors treating him were concerned as to whether he would walk again. He has since undergone more than 70 surgical operations. He remains disabled, using crutches to walk and says "Every day now is a chore". He separated from his wife and moved back to live with his mother, but was eventually requested by the council to leave her council property when she died in 2003. He subsequently resided briefly in a hostel for the homeless. He unsuccessfully invested £150,000 of his injury compensation in a property in Cyprus, and lived with his son until 2012 and the following year he moved back into a hostel.

Following the collision, he took up writing professionally. His autobiography The Working Man's Ballet was a critical success and led to work as a columnist on the Stoke Evening Sentinel and The Sporting Life. A further book The Tinker and The Talisman was self-published in 2003. In 2004 Hudson appeared as himself in a cameo appearance in the British film The Football Factory. In June 2006, he joined Radio Napa in Cyprus, where he commentated on the 2006 FIFA World Cup in Germany. In 2008 he released his third book, titled "The Waddington Years", which described his great friendship with former Stoke City manager Tony Waddington. In December 2012 Hudson said that he believed that his accident was actually a deliberate attempt on his life.

== Career statistics ==
=== Club statistics ===
Appearances and goals by club, season and competition
Club	Season	League			FA Cup		League Cup		Europe		Other^{[A]}		Total	
Club	Season	Division	Apps	Goals	Apps	Goals	Apps	Goals	Apps	Goals	Apps	Goals	Apps	Goals
Chelsea	1968–69	First Division	1	0	0	0	0	0	—		0	0	1	0
Chelsea	1969–70	First Division	29	3	6	0	2	0	—		0	0	37	3
Chelsea	1970–71	First Division	34	3	0	0	1	0	9	0	1	0	45	3
Chelsea	1971–72	First Division	36	2	3	0	9	2	4	2	0	0	52	6
Chelsea	1972–73	First Division	26	0	5	0	3	0	0	0	0	0	34	0
Chelsea	1973–74	First Division	19	2	0	0	1	0	0	0	0	0	20	2
Chelsea	Total		145	10	14	0	16	2	13	2	1	0	189	14
Stoke City	1973–74	First Division	18	3	0	0	0	0	—		0	0	18	3
Stoke City	1974–75	First Division	42	4	1	0	4	0	2	0	0	0	49	4
Stoke City	1975–76	First Division	34	2	5	0	1	0	—		0	0	40	2
Stoke City	1976–77	First Division	11	0	0	0	2	0	—		0	0	13	0
Stoke City	Total		105	9	6	0	7	0	2	0	0	0	120	9
Arsenal	1976–77	First Division	19	0	3	0	0	0	—		0	0	22	0
Arsenal	1977–78	First Division	17	0	4	0	4	0	—		0	0	25	0
Arsenal	Total		36	0	7	0	4	0	0	0	0	0	47	0
Seattle Sounders	1979	North American Soccer League	26	2	—		—		—		—		26	2
Seattle Sounders	1980	North American Soccer League	27	0	—		—		—		—		27	0
Seattle Sounders	1981	North American Soccer League	27	0	—		—		—		—		27	0
Seattle Sounders	1982	North American Soccer League	13	0	—		—		—		—		13	0
Seattle Sounders	1983	North American Soccer League	1	0	—		—		—		—		1	0
Seattle Sounders	Total		94	2	—		—		—		—		94	2
Stoke City	1983–84	First Division	16	0	0	0	0	0	—		0	0	16	0
Stoke City	1984–85	First Division	17	0	2	0	1	0	—		0	0	20	0
Stoke City	1985–86	Second Division	6	0	0	0	0	0	—		0	0	6	0
Stoke City	Total		39	0	2	0	1	0	0	0	0	0	42	0
Career total			419	21	29	0	28	2	15	2	1	0	492	25

A. The "Other" column constitutes appearances and goals in the Charity Shield.

=== Indoor statistics ===
Appearances and goals by club, season and competition
Club	Season			
Club	Season	Division	Apps	Goals
Cleveland Force	1979–80	MISL	13	6
Seattle Sounders	1981–82	NASL	18	12
Career total			31	18

=== International statistics ===
England national team
Year	Apps	Goals
1975	2	0
Total	2	0

== Honours ==
Chelsea

- European Cup Winners' Cup: 1970–71
- Football League Cup runner-up: 1971–72

Arsenal

- FA Cup runner-up: 1977–78

Individual

- PFA Team of the Year: 1974–75 First Division, 1975–76 First Division
