= Tony Waddington =

English footballer (1924–1994)

Personal information
- Full name: Anthony Waddington
- Date of birth: 9 November 1924
- Place of birth: Manchester, England
- Date of death: 21 January 1994 (aged 69)
- Position: Wing-half

Youth career
- Manchester United

Senior career*
Years	Team	Apps	(Gls)
1946–1953	Crewe Alexandra	178	(8)

Managerial career
- 1960–1977: Stoke City
- 1967: → Cleveland Stokers (USA)
- 1979–1981: Crewe Alexandra
- * Club domestic league appearances and goals

Anthony Waddington (9 November 1924 – 21 January 1994) was an English football player and manager. He managed both Crewe Alexandra and Stoke City.

Waddington had a seven-year playing career with Crewe Alexandra before becoming a coach at Stoke City. He progressed to assistant manager to Frank Taylor and took his position in June 1960. He set about staving off the threat of relegation before bringing back club legend Stanley Matthews in an effort to rekindle the club's supporter base. It worked well and he had enough money to bring in a number of established veterans as Stoke took the Football League Second Division title in 1962–63 and reached the 1964 Football League Cup Final, losing out to Leicester City.

More fine signings followed as Stoke enjoyed great success at the beginning of the 1970s reaching two FA Cup semi-finals, playing in the UEFA Cup twice and winning their first major trophy, the Football League Cup in 1972. Stoke then nearly won the First Division in 1974–75 but after the Butler Street Stand roof fell off in a strong storm at the Victoria Ground Stoke had to sell their best players to cover the repair costs and a despondent Waddington quit in March 1977 with Stoke heading for relegation. He later had a two-year spell at Crewe Alexandra before becoming associate director of Stoke in 1991 until his death in 1994.

== Playing career ==
Manchester born Waddington was an amateur with Manchester United before joining Crewe Alexandra just after the end of World War II. He played at wing-half for the "Alex" playing in seven seasons in the Football League Third Division North making 193 appearances scoring eight goals. During the war he served with the Royal Navy.

== Managerial career ==
He joined Stoke City as a coach in 1952 and did well enough to be promoted to assistant manager to Frank Taylor and when Taylor was sacked in 1960 Waddington was given his position. His first task was to prevent a poor Stoke side slipping into the Third Division in 1960–61, achieving this by a mere three points. He brought in a defensive tactic to adverse Stoke's slide which became known as 'Waddington's Wall'. But Waddington knew that this wouldn't bring back the crowds back to the Victoria Ground and so he decided something needed to be done. He pulled off a master stroke after paying £3,000 to Blackpool for the returning 46-year-old Stanley Matthews. Crowds instantly arrived in large numbers with Matthews first match back against Huddersfield Town more than 35,000 turned up a good 15,000 more than the last home match. A promotion push could not be sustained in 1961–62 but the feeling around the club had changed dramatically.

Promotion was achieved in a thrilling 1962–63 season which saw Stoke take the Second Division title. With the euphoria of winning promotion over, Waddington knew that his side had to be strengthened to have any hope of surviving in the First Division and he broke the club's record transfer for Peter Dobing. He also brought in John Ritchie from non-league Kettering Town he would go on to become the club's record goalscorer. Stoke stayed up easily in 1963–64 and also reached the 1964 Football League Cup Final losing a 2 legged affair to Leicester City. Stoke then had several mid-table seasons before Waddington brought in World Cup winners George Eastham and Gordon Banks to the club in 1966–67. However two poor seasons followed 1967–68 and 1968–69 which saw Stoke narrowly avoid relegation. But another raid in the transfer market saw Stoke fortunes turn around dramatically, as Waddington brought in Jimmy Greenhoff and re-signed John Ritchie this combined with local players Alan Bloor, Denis Smith, Alan Dodd, Mike Pejic and Jackie Marsh plus the emergence of Terry Conroy, John Mahoney saw Stoke enjoy their best period in their history.

They reached the FA Cup semi-finals two seasons running in 1970–71 and in 1971–72 losing both to Arsenal but guiding Stoke to their first major trophy, winning the 1972 League Cup beating Chelsea at Wembley. This saw Stoke able to attract some new players to the club such as Alan Hudson, Geoff Hurst and Peter Shilton and by 1974–75 Stoke had become a successful side in the country playing an attacking style of football and nearly won their first English league title.

But disaster struck in January 1976 as winds of hurricane force battered Stoke-on-Trent and the Victoria Ground was badly damaged. The roof of the Butler street stand collapsed and Stoke had to play a league match against Middlesbrough at nearby Vale Park whilst repair work was carried out. To pay for the repairs the club had to sell their best players, such as Jimmy Greenhoff to Manchester United, Alan Hudson to Arsenal and Mike Pejic to Everton. Waddington had to play inexperienced players in 1976–77 and with the side heading for relegation he left in March 1977. He had spent 25 years at the Victoria Ground as manager, assistant and coach and is considered to be the club's greatest manager having helped them win their first major trophy in 1972.

He then spent two years out of the game before having had a two-year spell in charge of Crewe Alexandra from 1979 to 1981. He returned to Stoke when he was appointed an associate director of the club in 1991 – a position he retained until his death in January 1994 at the age of 69. His son Steve was also a footballer.

== Career statistics ==
=== Player ===
Club	Season	League			FA Cup		Total	
Club	Season	Division	Apps	Goals	Apps	Goals	Apps	Goals
Crewe Alexandra	1946–47	Third Division North	23	3	0	0	23	3
Crewe Alexandra	1947–48	Third Division North	42	3	4	0	46	3
Crewe Alexandra	1948–49	Third Division North	41	1	3	0	44	1
Crewe Alexandra	1949–50	Third Division North	39	1	5	0	44	1
Crewe Alexandra	1950–51	Third Division North	25	0	3	0	28	0
Crewe Alexandra	1951–52	Third Division North	6	0	0	0	6	0
Crewe Alexandra	1952–53	Third Division North	2	0	0	0	2	0
Career Total			178	8	15	0	193	8

=== Manager ===
Managerial record by club and tenure
Team	From	To	Record				
Team	From	To	P	W	D	L	Win %
Stoke City	1 June 1960	22 March 1977	764	265	216	283	34.7
Crewe Alexandra	1 June 1979	31 July 1981	93	24	27	42	25.8
Total			857	289	243	325	33.7

== Honours ==
Stoke City

- Football League Second Division: 1962–63
- Football League Cup: 1971–72; runner-up: 1963–64
- Watney Cup: 1973

== See also ==
- List of longest managerial reigns in association football
