= 1960–61 Leicester City F.C. season =

1960–61 season of Leicester City

Leicester City
1960–61 season
- Chairman: Thomas Bloor
- Manager: Matt Gillies
- First Division: 6th
- FA Cup: Runners-up
- League Cup: Second round
- Top goalscorer: League: Walsh (22); All: Walsh (29)
- Average home league attendance: 24,056
Home colours

The 1960–61 season was Leicester City's 56th season in the Football League and their 18th (non-consecutive) season in the first tier of English football.

== Season summary ==
Leicester finished in their highest league position since finishing league runners-up 34 years previously. The club also reached the FA Cup final for the second time, eventually losing to Tottenham Hotspur who completed the first double of the 20th century. Though most of the talk about the Leicester cup final side was about the lack of Ken Leek, who had been controversially dropped for his off-the-field antics despite scoring in every round of the club's run to the final.

== Final league table ==
Pos	Team	Pld	W	D	L	GF	GA	GAv	Pts	Qualification or relegation
4	Burnley	42	22	7	13	102	77	1.325	51	
5	Everton	42	22	6	14	87	69	1.261	50	
6	Leicester City	42	18	9	15	87	70	1.243	45	Qualification for the European Cup Winners' Cup preliminary round (Note: Leicester City qualified for the Cup Winners' Cup preliminary round as the 1960–61 FA Cup runners-up, since the winners, Tottenham Hotspur, had already qualified for the European Cup.)
7	Manchester United	42	18	9	15	88	76	1.158	45	
8	Blackburn Rovers	42	15	13	14	77	76	1.013	43	

Source: World Football
Rules for classification: 1) Points; 2) Goal average; 3) Goals scored

== Results ==
Leicester City's score comes first

=== Legend ===
Win	Draw	Loss

=== Football League First Division ===
Date	Opponent	Venue	Result	Attendance	Scorers
20 August 1960	Blackpool	H	1–1	27,062	Appleton
24 August 1960	Chelsea	A	3–1	24,691	Wills (2), Walsh
27 August 1960	Everton	A	1–3	45,215	Cheesebrough
31 August 1960	Chelsea	H	1–3	21,087	Walsh
3 September 1960	Blackburn Rovers	H	2–4	17,455	Walsh, Wills
7 September 1960	Wolverhampton Wanderers	A	2–3	33,313	Wills, Leek
10 September 1960	Manchester United	A	1–1	35,493	Walsh
14 September 1960	Wolverhampton Wanderers	H	2–0	20,044	Walsh, King (pen)
17 September 1960	Tottenham Hotspur	H	1–2	25,567	Riley
24 September 1960	Newcastle United	A	3–1	21,161	Leek (2), Cheesebrough
1 October 1960	Aston Villa	A	3–1	29,623	Walsh (2), Wills
8 October 1960	Arsenal	H	2–1	22,501	Leek (2)
15 October 1960	Manchester City	A	1–3	30,193	Leek
22 October 1960	West Bromwich Albion	H	2–2	20,770	Lornie, Cheesebrough
28 October 1960	Cardiff City	A	1–2	19,136	Walsh
4 November 1960	Preston North End	H	5–2	16,920	Leek (2), Walsh, Cheesebrough, Riley
12 November 1960	Fulham	A	2–4	16,617	King (pen), Cheesebrough
19 November 1960	Sheffield Wednesday	H	2–1	25,567	Walsh, Wills
26 November 1960	Birmingham City	A	2–0	25,583	Leek, Wills
3 December 1960	Nottingham Forest	H	1–1	20,545	Cheesebrough
10 December 1960	Burnley	A	2–3	20,640	Wills, Leek
17 December 1960	Blackpool	A	1–5	8,752	Walsh
24 December 1960	Bolton Wanderers	A	0–2	11,534	
26 December 1960	Bolton Wanderers	H	2–0	23,806	Wills, Keyworth
31 December 1960	Everton	H	4–1	23,495	Riley, Walsh, Leek (2)
14 January 1961	Blackburn Rovers	A	1–1	14,752	Leek
21 January 1961	Manchester United	H	6–0	31,308	Walsh (2), Keyworth (2), Wills, Riley (pen)
4 February 1961	Tottenham Hotspur	A	3–2	53,627	Leek, Walsh (2)
11 February 1961	Newcastle United	H	5–3	26,449	King (2 pens), Cheesebrough, Leek, Dalton (own goal)
25 February 1961	Arsenal	A	3–1	31,721	Keyworth (2), Appleton
11 March 1961	West Bromwich Albion	A	0–1	25,168	
25 March 1961	Preston North End	A	0–0	12,567	
31 March 1961	West Ham United	A	0–1	22,010	
1 April 1961	Burnley	H	2–2	27,838	Leek, Walsh
3 April 1961	West Ham United	H	5–1	23,776	Cheesebrough (3), Riley, McIlmoyle
8 April 1961	Sheffield Wednesday	A	2–2	29,904	Walsh, McLintock
10 April 1961	Cardiff City	H	3–0	32,042	Walsh (2), McIlmoyle
15 April 1961	Fulham	H	1–2	30,980	Walsh
19 April 1961	Aston Villa	H	3–1	21,219	McIlmoyle (2), Keyworth
22 April 1961	Nottingham Forest	A	2–2	25,830	Cheesebrough, Leek
26 April 1961	Manchester City	H	1–2	22,248	Walsh
29 April 1961	Birmingham City	H	3–2	19,920	Cross, Riley, Leek

=== FA Cup ===
Round	Date	Opponent	Venue	Result	Attendance	Goalscorers
R3	7 January 1961	Oxford United	H	3–1	25,601	Walsh, Leek, Riley
R4	31 January 1961	Bristol City	H	5–1	27,701	Wills, Leek (2), Walsh (2)
R5	18 February 1961	Birmingham City	A	1–1	53,589	Riley
R5R	22 February 1961	Birmingham City	H	2–1	41,916	Leek (2)
QF	4 March 1961	Barnsley	H	0–0	38,744	
QFR	8 March 1961	Barnsley	A	2–1 (a.e.t.)	39,250	Riley, Leek
SF	18 March 1961	Sheffield United	N	0–0	52,095	
SFR	23 March 1961	Sheffield United	N	0–0 (a.e.t.)	43,500	
SFR2	27 March 1961	Sheffield United	N	2–0	37,190	Walsh 47', Leek 58'
F	6 May 1961	Tottenham Hotspur	N	0–2	100,000	

=== League Cup ===
Round	Date	Opponent	Venue	Result	Attendance	Goalscorers
R1	12 October 1960	Mansfield Town	H	4–0	7,070	Cheesebrough, Walsh (3)
R2	26 October 1960	Rotherham United	H	1–2	6,244	King (pen)

== Squad ==
Note: Flags indicate national team as defined under FIFA eligibility rules; some limited exceptions apply. Players may hold more than one non-FIFA nationality.

Pos.	Nation	Player
GK	ENG	Gordon Banks
DF	ENG	Len Chalmers
DF	SCO	Richie Norman
MF	SCO	Ian White
DF	ENG	Tony Knapp
MF	ENG	Colin Appleton
MF	SCO	George Meek
FW	ENG	Albert Cheesebrough
FW	ENG	Derek Hines
FW	SCO	Jimmy Walsh
MF	ENG	Gordon Wills

Pos.	Nation	Player
MF	SCO	Frank McLintock
MF	ENG	Howard Riley
FW	WAL	Ken Leek
DF	SCO	Ian King
GK	ENG	Rodney Slack
FW	SCO	Jack Lornie
DF	SCO	John Sjoberg
FW	ENG	Ken Keyworth
GK	ENG	George Heyes
FW	ENG	Hughie McIlmoyle
DF	ENG	Graham Cross

== Club statistics ==
All data from: Dave Smith and Paul Taylor, Of Fossils and Foxes: The Official Definitive History of Leicester City Football Club (2001) (ISBN 1-899538-21-6)

=== Top goalscorers ===
Pos.	Nat.	Name	Div 1	FAC	LC	Total
1	(Scotland)	Jimmy Walsh	22	4	3	29
2	(Wales)	Ken Leek	18	7	0	25
3	(England)	Albert Cheesebrough	11	0	1	12
4	(England)	Gordon Wills	10	1	0	11
5	(England)	Howard Riley	6	3	0	9
7	(England)	Ken Keyworth	6	0	0	6
8	(Scotland)	Ian King	4	0	1	6
9	(Scotland)	Hugh McIlmoyle	4	0	0	4
10	(England)	Colin Appleton	2	0	0	2
11	(Scotland)	Frank McLintock	1	0	0	1
=	(Scotland)	Jack Lornie	1	0	0	1
=	(England)	Graham Cross	1	0	0	1
Own goals			1	0	0	1
