= 1961–62 Leicester City F.C. season =

1961–62 season of Leicester City

Leicester City
1961–62 season
- Chairman: Walter Needham
- Manager: Matt Gillies
- First Division: 14th
- FA Cup: Third round
- League Cup: Second round
- European Cup Winners' Cup: First round
- Top goalscorer: League: Walsh (15); All: Keyworth (18)
- Average home league attendance: 19,459
Home colours

During the 1961–62 English football season, Leicester City F.C. competed in the Football League First Division.

== Season summary ==
In the 1961–62 season, Leicester were England's representatives in the 1961–62 European Cup Winners' Cup as result in reaching the 1961 FA Cup Final the previous season but in the end, the Foxes were knocked out by eventual winners Atlético Madrid in the first round.

In the league, Leicester's challenge never really got going and the Foxes were hovering around mid-table for most of the campaign and finished the season in 14th place.

In the domestic cup competitions, Leicester's efforts ended in disastrous fashion. In the League Cup, the Foxes were beaten by Fourth Division side York City in the second round and in the FA Cup, Leicester lost the third round replay to Stoke City despite having two goals ruled out for offside.

== Final league table ==
Pos	Team	Pld	W	D	L	GF	GA	GAv	Pts
12	Manchester City	42	17	7	18	78	81	0.963	41
13	Blackpool	42	15	11	16	70	75	0.933	41
14	Leicester City	42	17	6	19	72	71	1.014	40
15	Manchester United	42	15	9	18	72	75	0.960	39
16	Blackburn Rovers	42	14	11	17	50	58	0.862	39

Source: World Football
Rules for classification: 1) Points; 2) Goal average; 3) Goals scored

== Results ==
Leicester City's score comes first

=== Legend ===
Win	Draw	Loss

=== Football League First Division ===
Date	Opponent	Venue	Result	Attendance	Scorers
19 August 1961	Manchester City	A	1–3	28,899	Wills
23 August 1961	Arsenal	H	0–1	29,396	
26 August 1961	West Bromwich Albion	H	1–0	20,899	Riley
29 August 1961	Arsenal	A	4–4	35,055	Walsh, Cheesebrough (2), Keyworth
2 September 1961	Birmingham City	A	5–1	21,950	Keyworth, Wills (2), Walsh (2)
5 September 1961	Burnley	A	0–2	22,339	
9 September 1961	Everton	H	2–0	19,889	Wills, Walsh
16 September 1961	Fulham	A	1–2	19,831	Keyworth
20 September 1961	Burnley	H	2–6	25,567	Walsh (2)
23 September 1961	Sheffield Wednesday	H	1–0	21,338	Riley (pen)
30 September 1961	West Ham United	A	1–4	26,746	McLintock
7 October 1961	Sheffield United	H	4–1	17,952	Riley, Walsh, Wills, Chalmers
14 October 1961	Chelsea	A	3–1	21,377	Wills, McLintock (2)
21 October 1961	Blackpool	H	0–2	17,424	
28 October 1961	Blackburn Rovers	A	1–1	11,113	Keyworth
4 November 1961	Wolverhampton Wanderers	H	3–0	18,952	Riley (pen), Wills, Appleton
11 November 1961	Manchester United	A	2–2	21,567	McLintock, Appleton
18 November 1961	Cardiff City	H	3–0	16,992	Appleton, Keyworth, McIlmoyle
25 November 1961	Tottenham Hotspur	A	2–1	41,745	Keyworth, Appleton
2 December 1961	Aston Villa	H	0–2	22,611	
9 December 1961	Nottingham Forest	A	0–0	22,524	
16 December 1961	Manchester City	H	2–0	15,196	Cheesebrough, Walsh
23 December 1961	West Bromwich Albion	A	0–2	14,286	
26 December 1961	Ipswich Town	A	0–1	18,146	
13 January 1962	Birmingham City	H	1–2	22,681	Cheesebrough
20 January 1962	Everton	A	2–3	33,934	Walsh, Riley (pen)
3 February 1962	Fulham	H	4–1	20,272	Walsh (2), Keyworth, Riley (pen)
10 February 1962	Sheffield Wednesday	A	2–1	18,179	Walsh, Johnson (own goal)
17 February 1962	West Ham United	H	2–2	21,312	Keyworth (2)
24 February 1962	Sheffield United	A	1–3	24,015	Keyworth
10 March 1962	Blackpool	A	1–2	10,952	Cheesebrough
17 March 1962	Blackburn Rovers	H	2–0	16,194	Keyworth, Cheesebrough
24 March 1962	Wolverhampton Wanderers	A	1–1	22,025	Gibson
28 March 1962	Ipswich Town	H	0–2	19,068	
4 April 1962	Manchester United	H	4–3	15,318	Cheesebrough (2), Keyworth (2)
7 April 1962	Cardiff City	A	4–0	11,058	Cheesebrough (2), Keyworth, King
11 April 1962	Chelsea	H	2–0	15,184	Cheesebrough, Norman
21 April 1962	Aston Villa	A	3–8	24,184	Walsh (2), Riley (pen)
23 April 1962	Bolton Wanderers	A	0–1	19,264	
24 April 1962	Bolton Wanderers	H	1–1	14,093	Walsh
28 April 1962	Nottingham Forest	H	2–1	14,267	McLintock (2)
30 April 1962	Tottenham Hotspur	H	2–3	23,929	Cross, Thomson

=== FA Cup ===
Round	Date	Opponent	Venue	Result	Attendance	Goalscorers
R3	10 January 1962	Stoke City	H	1–1	35,663	Riley
R3R	15 January 1962	Stoke City	A	2–5	38,315	Riley, Keyworth

=== League Cup ===
Round	Date	Opponent	Venue	Result	Attendance	Goalscorers
R2	9 October 1961	York City	A	1–2	13,275	Mitten

=== European Cup Winners' Cup ===
Round	Date	Opponent	Venue	Result	Attendance	Goalscorers
PR First Leg	13 September 1961	Glenavon	A	4–1	7,084	Walsh (2), Appleton, Keyworth
PR Second Leg	27 September 1961	Glenavon	H	3–1 (won 7-2 on agg)	10,445	Wills, Keyworth, McIlmoyle
R1 First Leg	25 October 1961	Atlético Madrid	H	1–1	25,527	Keyworth
R1 Second Leg	15 November 1961	Atlético Madrid	A	0–2 (lost 1-3 on agg)	27,460	

== Squad ==
Note: Flags indicate national team as defined under FIFA eligibility rules; some limited exceptions apply. Players may hold more than one non-FIFA nationality.

Pos.	Nation	Player
GK	ENG	Gordon Banks
DF	ENG	Len Chalmers
DF	SCO	Ian King
DF	SCO	Richie Norman
MF	ENG	Colin Appleton
FW	ENG	Ken Keyworth
FW	SCO	Jimmy Walsh
MF	ENG	Howard Riley
MF	SCO	Frank McLintock
MF	ENG	Gordon Wills

Pos.	Nation	Player
FW	ENG	Albert Cheesebrough
MF	SCO	Ian White
MF	ENG	John Mitten
FW	ENG	Hughie McIlmoyle
MF	ENG	Mike Stringfellow
DF	ENG	Graham Cross
FW	SCO	Dave Gibson
DF	SCO	John Sjoberg
GK	ENG	George Heyes
FW	SCO	Dave Thomson
