= 1962–63 Leicester City F.C. season =

1962–63 season of Leicester City

Leicester City
1962–63 season
- Chairman: W.S.G. Needham
- Manager: Matt Gillies
- First Division: 4th
- FA Cup: Runners-up
- League Cup: 2nd Round
- Top goalscorer: League: Ken Keyworth (21); All: Ken Keyworth (27)
- Average home league attendance: 25,841
Home colours

The 1962–63 season was Leicester City's 58th season in the Football League and their 20th (non-consecutive) season in the first tier of English football. Under the management of Matt Gillies and starring players Gordon Banks, Frank McLintock and Dave Gibson, Leicester sensationally chased the double. After losing 3–1 to Manchester United in the FA Cup Final and gaining just one win from their final nine league games their double challenge collapsed and the Foxes eventually finished in a disappointing fourth position in the league.

The Big Freeze of 1962–1963, was one of the coldest winters on record Football matches in the English leagues suffered because of the severe effects of the winter weather. Some matches in the FA Cup were rescheduled ten or more times. Matches in the fifth and sixth rounds, scheduled for 16 February and 9 March respectively, were played on 16 and 30 March. A board known as the Pools Panel was set up to adjudicate postponed matches to provide the football pool results. From 26 December to 9 February, Leicester completed no league matches. The delays occurred before under-soil heating became widespread at major venues. When the thaw arrived, a backlog of fixtures had to be hastily determined. The Football League season was extended by four weeks from its original finishing date of 27 April. The final league fixtures took place one day before the rescheduled FA Cup final.

== Overview ==
The horrendous winter of 1962–63 was the coldest winter of the 20th century in England and Wales and saw a plethora of games being called off: there was no First Division match played in England during January 1963 and Leicester did not play a game between Boxing Day 1962 and 9 February 1963.

As games began to start being played again after the lengthy hiatus, Leicester, on the icy pitches, began to gain huge momentum and went on a lengthy winning and unbeaten run which saw them top the table with nine (and later five) games to go and reach the 1963 FA Cup Final. However, as injuries took hold and the ice began to melt Leicester's momentum faded and they ended up winning just one of their final nine league games and losing the FA Cup final to Manchester United despite being hot favourites, after a dour performance. Though they were chasing the double during the icy period, as the season came to a close the Foxes ended in a disappointing fourth position and as FA Cup runners-up.

Between 10 November 1962 and 8 April 1963, Leicester went on a run of 18 matches unbeaten, earning themselves the nickname "the ice kings" and creating a club record which stood for 46 years, until it was beaten in the 2008–09 season, though Leicester were in a division two tiers lower than that of the 1962-63 side. Their run of seven consecutive league wins between 9 February 1963 and 9 March 1963 was a club record which stood until 8 December 2019 when Brendan Rodgers' side won their eighth consecutive Premier League game.

== Players ==
Leicester's creative attack was built around the skillful playmaker Dave Gibson who forged a deadly partnership on the left of Leicester's attack with Mike Stringfellow. Ken Keyworth was the club's centre forward and prolific goalscorer upfront, while Howard Riley provided balance on the right-wing. Much of the flexibility in the side came from the athleticism of Frank McLintock and Graham Cross, who regularly changed positions during games which Gillies said "utterly confused [the] opposition" as opposition players would often be asked to mark "our [Leicester's] number eight, so they thought Cross was their man, when McLintock had replaced him" as "players hadn't got beyond thinking about numbers then."

In defence, Leicester forged a fearsome half-back line of McLintock, Ian King and club captain Colin Appleton with John Sjoberg and Richie Norman as full-backs and legendary goalkeeper Gordon Banks in goal.

== Influence on English football ==
The Ice Kings were managed by Matt Gillies and his assistant Bert Johnson and were hugely influential in English football for their fluid "switch" and "whirl" systems and playing sequences of short probing passes to unlock defences and establishing the concept of positional flexibility and for their switching of positions, particularly of inside right and right-half Graham Cross and Frank McLintock, upsetting the tradition 1-11 formations in England and confusing opposition players, who were used to thinking in terms of rigid formations in the English game. Johnson had brought back this system from watching the great Hungary and Austria sides of the 1950s and he and Gillies developed their own version of the systems with Leicester.

Gillies later said it "confused opposition" as opposition players would often be asked to mark "our [Leicester's] number eight, so they thought Cross was their man, when McLintock had replaced him" as "players hadn't got beyond thinking about numbers then."

== Results ==
=== Football League First Division ===
- Leicester City scores given first

Game	Date	Venue	Opponents	Score	Scorers	Points	Position
1	18 August 1962	Away	Fulham	1–2	Stringfellow	0	15th
2	22 August 1962	Home	Sheffield Wednesday	3–3	Walsh, Stringfellow, Riley	1	13th
3	25 August 1962	Home	Nottingham Forest	2–1	Stringfellow (2)	3	10th
4	29 August 1962	Away	Sheffield Wednesday	3–0	Stringfellow (2), Walsh	5	6th
5	1 September 1962	Home	Bolton Wanderers	4–1	Walsh (2), Cross, Gibson	7	4th
6	4 September 1962	Away	Burnley	1–1	Gibson	8	5th
7	8 September 1962	Away	Everton	2–3	Walsh, Riley	8	6th
8	15 September 1962	Home	West Bromwich Albion	1–0	Cross	10	6th
9	19 September 1962	Home	Burnley	3–3	Keyworth, McLintock, Riley	11	5th
10	22 September 1962	Away	Arsenal	1–1	Keyworth	12	6th
11	29 September 1962	Home	Birmingham City	3–0	Foster (o.g.), Keyworth, Cheesebrough	14	5th
12	6 October 1962	Away	Ipswich Town	1–0	McLintock	16	5th
13	13 October 1962	Home	Liverpool	3–0	Gibson, Cheesebrough, Cross	18	5th
14	20 October 1962	Away	Blackburn Rovers	0–2		18	5th
15	27 October 1962	Home	Sheffield United	3–1	Keyworth (2), Cross	20	4th
16	3 November 1962	Away	Tottenham Hotspur	0–4		20	4th
17	10 November 1962	Home	West Ham United	2–0	Stringfellow, McLintock	22	4th
18	17 November 1962	Away	Manchester City	1–1	Keyworth	23	4th
19	24 November 1962	Home	Blackpool	0–0		24	4th
20	1 December 1962	Away	Wolverhampton Wanderers	3–1	Gibson (2), Flowers (o.g.)	26	4th
21	8 December 1962	Home	Aston Villa	3–3	Gibson (2), Stringfellow	27	4th
22	15 December 1962	Home	Fulham	2–3	Walsh, Stringfellow	27	4th
23	26 December 1962	Home	Leyton Orient	5–1	Keyworth (2), Charlton (o.g.), Cheesebrough, Appleton	29	3rd
24	9 February 1963	Home	Arsenal	2–0	Keyworth (2)	31	3rd
25	12 February 1963	Home	Everton	3–1	Keyworth, Stringfellow, Cross	33	3rd
26	19 February 1963	Away	Nottingham Forest	2–0	Keyworth (2)	35	2nd
27	23 February 1963	Home	Ipswich Town	3–0	Gibson, Stringfellow, Riley	37	2nd
28	2 March 1963	Away	Liverpool	2–0	Keyworth, Gibson	39	2nd
29	9 March 1963	Home	Blackburn Rovers	2–0	Riley, Stringfellow	41	2nd
30	23 March 1963	Home	Tottenham Hotspur	2–2	Stringfellow, Keyworth	42	2nd
31	26 March 1963	Away	Sheffield United	0–0		43	2nd
32	3 April 1963	Away	Leyton Orient	2–0	Stringfellow (2)	45	2nd
33	6 April 1963	Home	Manchester City	2–0	Stringfellow (2)	47	2nd
34	8 April 1963	Away	Blackpool	1–1	Keyworth	48	1st
35	13 April 1963	Away	West Ham United	0–2		48	2nd
36	15 April 1963	Away	Manchester United	2–2	Cross, Norman	49	2nd
37	16 April 1963	Home	Manchester United	4–3	Heath, Keyworth (3)	51	1st
38	20 April 1963	Home	Wolverhampton Wanderers	1–1	Keyworth	52	2nd
39	4 May 1963	Away	West Bromwich Albion	1–2	Cross	52	3rd
40	11 May 1963	Away	Bolton Wanderers	0–2		52	3rd
41	15 May 1963	Away	Aston Villa	1–3	Keyworth	52	4th
42	18 May 1963	Away	Birmingham City	2–3	Heath, McLintock	52	4th

=== FA Cup ===
- Leicester City scores given first

Round	Date	Venue	Opponents	Score	Scorers
3	8 January 1963	Away	Grimsby Town	3–1	Gibson (2), Keyworth
4	30 January 1963	Home	Ipswich Town	3–1	Cross, Keyworth (2)
5	16 March 1963	Away	Leyton Orient	1–0	Keyworth (2)
6	30 March 1963	Away	Norwich City	2–0	Stringfellow, Gibson
SF	27 April 1963	Neutral	Liverpool	1–0	Stringfellow
Final	25 May 1963	Neutral	Manchester United	1–3	Keyworth

=== Football League Cup ===
- Leicester City scores given first

Round	Date	Venue	Opponents	Score	Scorers
2	26 September 1962	Home	Charlton Athletic	4–4	Gibson, Walsh(2), Riley
2rep.	2 October 1962	Away	Charlton Athletic	1–2	Keyworth

== First Division statistics ==
=== First Division table ===
Pos	Club	Pld	W	D	L	F	A	GA	Pts
1	Everton	42	25	11	6	84	42	2.00	61
2	Tottenham Hotspur	42	23	9	10	111	62	1.79	55
3	Burnley	42	22	10	10	78	57	1.37	54
4	Leicester City	42	20	12	10	79	53	1.49	52
5	Wolverhampton Wanderers	42	20	10	12	93	65	1.43	50
6	Sheffield Wednesday	42	19	10	13	77	63	1.22	48

Pld = Matches played; W = Matches won; D = Matches drawn; L = Matches lost; F = Goals for; A = Goals against; GA = Goal average; Pts = Points

== Club statistics ==
All data from: Dave Smith and Paul Taylor, Of Fossils and Foxes: The Official Definitive History of Leicester City Football Club (2001) (ISBN 1-899538-21-6)

=== Appearances ===
Pos.	Nat.	Name	Div 1	FAC	LC	Total
GK	(England)	Gordon Banks	38	6	2	46
GK	(England)	George Heyes	4	0	0	4
DF	(England)	Len Chalmers	23	0	2	25
DF	(England)	Richie Norman	42	6	2	50
DF	(Scotland)	Frank McLintock	42	6	2	50
DF	(Scotland)	Ian King	39	6	2	47
DF	(England)	Colin Appleton	40	6	2	48
DF	(England)	Graham Cross	29	6	2	37
DF	(Scotland)	John Sjoberg	20	6	0	26
MF	(England)	Howard Riley	32	6	2	40
MF	(Scotland)	Dave Gibson	36	6	2	44
MF	(Scotland)	Bill McDerment	2	0	0	2
MF	(England)	Terry Heath	5	0	0	5
FW	(England)	Mike Stringfellow	29	6	0	35
FW	(Scotland)	Jimmy Walsh	26	0	1	27
FW	(England)	Ken Keyworth	32	6	1	39
FW	(England)	Albert Cheesebrough	23	0	2	25

=== Goalscorers ===
Pos.	Nat.	Name	Div 1	FAC	LC	Total
1	(England)	Ken Keyworth	21	5	1	27
2	(England)	Mike Stringfellow	17	2	0	19
3	(Scotland)	Dave Gibson	9	3	1	13
4	(England)	Graham Cross	7	0	1	8
=	(Scotland)	Jimmy Walsh	6	0	2	8
6	(England)	Howard Riley	5	0	1	6
7	(Scotland)	Frank McLintock	4	0	0	4
8	(England)	Albert Cheesebrough	3	0	0	3
9	(England)	Terry Heath	2	0	0	2
10	(England)	Richie Norman	1	0	0	1
=	(England)	Colin Appleton	1	0	0	1
Own goals			3	0	0	3
