= List of Leicester City F.C. managers =

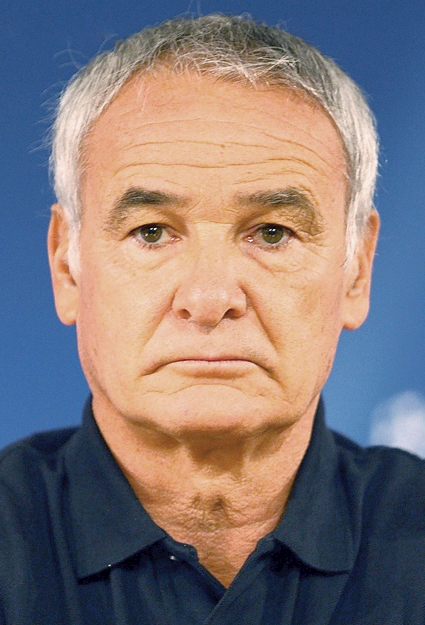
Claudio Ranieri was the manager of the Leicester City side that won the Premier League in 2015–16.

The manager at Leicester City is currently Russell Martin. Until Peter Hodge was hired after the First World War, Leicester City had no official manager. A nominal role of secretary/manager was employed, though the board and the selection committee took control of most team affairs.

It was Peter Hodge who instated a system at the club for the manager having complete control over player and staff recruitment, team selection and tactics. Though Hodge was also originally titled "secretary/manager", he has retrospectively been named as the club's first official "manager".

Hodge and Nigel Pearson have both had two separate spells at the club. Dave Bassett also had a second spell as caretaker manager after his spell as permanent manager. Listed below is Leicester City's complete managerial history. This list contains dates of tenure and records while at the club.

== Key ==
- P = Games managed
- W = Games won
- D = Games drawn
- L = Games lost
- Win% = Percentage of games won

== Secretary/Managers ==
Name	Nat.	Dates
Frank Gardner	England	1884–1892
Ernest Marson	England	1892–1894
J. Lee	England	1894–1895
Henry Jackson	England	1895–1897
William Clark	Scotland	1897–1898
George Johnson	England	1898–1912
John W. Bartlett	England	1912–1914
Louis Ford	England	1914–1915
Harry Linney	England	1915–1919

== Managers ==
- The names of caretakers are in italics.

As of 21 September 2026

Name	Nationality	From	To	P	W	D	L	Win %	Honours
Peter Hodge	Scotland	6 September 1919	May 1926	310	125	84	101	40.32	Second Division champions: 1924–25
Willie Orr	Scotland	July 1926	January 1932	242	102	50	90	42.15	First Division runners-up: 1928–29
Board		January 1932	March 1932	10	2	3	5	20.00	
Peter Hodge	Scotland	March 1932	1 August 1934	100	34	26	40	34.00	
Board		1 August 1934	17 October 1934	10	2	4	4	20.00	
Arthur Lochhead	Scotland	17 October 1934	2 September 1936	81	33	15	33	40.74	
Board		2 September 1936	October 1936	8	1	2	5	12.50	
Frank Womack	England	October 1936	May 1939	123	48	29	46	39.02	Second Division champions: 1936–37
Tom Bromilow	England	August 1939	May 1945	0	0	0	0	n/a	
Tom Mather	England	August 1945	March 1946	2	0	1	1	00.00	
Johnny Duncan	Scotland	March 1946	11 October 1949	156	56	42	58	35.90	FA Cup runners-up: 1948–49
Board		11 October 1949	December 1949	7	1	4	2	14.29	
Norman Bullock	England	December 1949	February 1955	232	91	64	77	39.22	Second Division champions: 1953–54
Board		February 1955	May 1955	15	7	3	5	46.67	
Dave Halliday	Scotland	June 1955	November 1958	146	64	27	55	43.84	Second Division champions: 1956–57
Matt Gillies	Scotland	8 November 1958	30 November 1968	508	201	123	184	39.57	FA Cup runners-up: 1960–61; FA Cup runners-up: 1962–63; League Cup winners: 1963–64; League Cup runners-up: 1964–65
Frank O'Farrell	Ireland	December 1968	6 June 1971	134	62	27	55	46.27	FA Cup runners-up: 1968–69; Second Division champions: 1970–71
Jimmy Bloomfield	England	23 June 1971	23 May 1977	285	85	104	96	29.82	FA Charity Shield winners: 1971
Frank McLintock	Scotland	9 June 1977	5 April 1978	40	5	12	23	12.50	
Ian MacFarlane	Scotland	5 April 1978	24 May 1978	5	1	0	4	20.00	
Jock Wallace	Scotland	24 May 1978	12 July 1982	189	69	51	69	37.10	Second Division champions: 1979–80
Gordon Milne	England	2 August 1982	3 June 1986	184	64	41	79	34.78	Second Division promotion: 1982–83
Gordon Milne; Bryan Hamilton	England; Northern Ireland	June 1986	May 1987	46	13	9	24	28.26	
Bryan Hamilton	Northern Ireland	May 1987	11 December 1987	27	10	6	11	37.04	
David Pleat	England	24 December 1987	29 January 1991	157	49	45	63	31.21	
Gordon Lee	England	30 January 1991	29 May 1991	20	7	2	11	35.00	
Brian Little	England	30 May 1991	22 November 1994	188	81	45	62	43.09	First Division promotion: 1993–94
Kevin MacDonald; Tony McAndrew	Scotland	22 November 1994	14 December 1994	3	0	1	2	00.00	
Mark McGhee	Scotland	14 December 1994	7 December 1995	51	16	14	21	31.37	
David Nish; Chris Turner; Garry Parker; Steve Walsh	England	7 December 1995	21 December 1995	2	1	0	1	50.00	
Martin O'Neill	Northern Ireland	21 December 1995	1 June 2000	222	85	67	70	38.29	First Division promotion: 1995–96; League Cup winners: 1996–97; League Cup runners-up: 1998–99; League Cup winners: 1999–2000
Peter Taylor	England	12 June 2000	30 September 2001	54	19	9	26	35.19	
Garry Parker	England	30 September 2001	10 October 2001	1	0	0	1	00.00	
Dave Bassett	England	10 October 2001	6 April 2002	28	4	8	16	14.29	
Micky Adams	England	7 April 2002	11 October 2004	111	41	38	32	36.94	First Division promotion: 2002–03
Dave Bassett; Howard Wilkinson	England	11 October 2004	30 October 2004	4	0	4	0	00.00	
Craig Levein	Scotland	1 November 2004	25 January 2006	70	20	25	25	28.57	
Rob Kelly	England	13 February 2006	11 April 2007	63	21	19	23	33.33	
Nigel Worthington	Northern Ireland	11 April 2007	7 May 2007	5	2	0	3	40.00	
Martin Allen	England	25 May 2007	29 August 2007	4	2	1	1	50.00	
Jon Rudkin; Steve Beaglehole; Mike Stowell	England	30 August 2007	13 September 2007	1	0	1	0	00.00	
Gary Megson	England	13 September 2007	24 October 2007	9	3	4	2	33.33	
Frank Burrows; Gerry Taggart	Scotland; Northern Ireland	24 October 2007	22 November 2007	5	1	2	2	20.00	
Ian Holloway	England	22 November 2007	23 May 2008	32	9	8	15	28.13	
Nigel Pearson	England	22 June 2008	29 June 2010	107	55	30	22	51.40	League One champions: 2008–09
Paulo Sousa	Portugal	7 July 2010	1 October 2010	12	4	2	6	33.33	
Chris Powell; Mike Stowell	England	1 October 2010	4 October 2010	1	1	0	0	100.00	
Sven-Göran Eriksson	Sweden	4 October 2010	24 October 2011	55	24	14	17	43.64	
Jon Rudkin; Steve Beaglehole; Mike Stowell	England	24 October 2011	15 November 2011	3	1	0	2	33.33	
Nigel Pearson	England	15 November 2011	30 June 2015	175	80	37	58	45.71	Championship champions: 2013–14
Claudio Ranieri	Italy	13 July 2015	23 February 2017	81	36	22	23	44.44	Premier League champions: 2015–16
Craig Shakespeare	England	23 February 2017	17 October 2017	26	11	6	9	42.31	
Michael Appleton	England	17 October 2017	25 October 2017	2	2	0	0	100.00	
Claude Puel	France	25 October 2017	24 February 2019	67	23	18	26	34.33	
Mike Stowell; Adam Sadler	England	24 February 2019	26 February 2019	1	1	0	0	100.00	
Brendan Rodgers	Northern Ireland	26 February 2019	2 April 2023	204	92	42	70	45.10	FA Cup winners: 2020–21; FA Community Shield winners: 2021
Mike Stowell; Adam Sadler	England	2 April 2023	10 April 2023	2	0	0	2	00.00	
Dean Smith	England	10 April 2023	16 June 2023	8	2	3	3	25.00	
Enzo Maresca	Italy	16 June 2023	3 June 2024	53	36	4	13	67.92	Championship champions: 2023–24
Steve Cooper	Wales	20 June 2024	24 November 2024	15	3	5	7	20.00	
Ben Dawson	England	24 November 2024	1 December 2024	1	0	0	1	00.00	
Ruud van Nistelrooy	Netherlands	1 December 2024	27 June 2025	27	5	3	19	18.52	
Martí Cifuentes	Spain	15 July 2025	25 January 2026	31	11	9	11	35.48	
Andy King	Wales	25 January 2026	18 February 2026	4	0	0	4	00.00	
Gary Rowett	England	18 February 2026	15 June 2026	14	2	8	4	14.30	
Russell Martin	Scotland	15 June 2026	present	16	7	3	6	43.75	

== Notes ==
- When the exact dates of the managerial stint are unknown, only the month and the year is given.
- Tom Bromilow, Tom Mather and Johnny Duncan all took charge of wartime fixtures, which are not counted as "competitive fixtures".
- Matt Gillies' stint includes a period between January 1968 and March 1968 when Gillies was ill with tuberculosis and Bert Johnson took control of first-team affairs.
- During the 1986–87 season both Gordon Milne and Bryan Hamilton shared managerial duties, with Milne assuming the title "General Manager" and Hamilton assuming the title "Team Manager".

== By nationality ==
This table lists Leicester City managers by nationality.

*Includes permanent managers and the role of secretary/manager only.*

Nationality	Number
England	26
Scotland	13
Northern Ireland	5
Italy	2
Ireland	1
Portugal	1
Sweden	1
France	1
Netherlands	1
Wales	1
