= Saint Mungo Cup =

1951 Saint Mungo Cup
Tournament details
- Country: Scotland
- Teams: 16

Final positions
- Champions: Celtic
- Runners-up: Aberdeen

The Saint Mungo Cup was a one-off football tournament held in Glasgow, Scotland, to celebrate the 1951 Festival of Britain. The competition was contested by fourteen 'Scottish Division A' clubs together with Clyde and Queens Park from 'Division B'. Celtic defeated Aberdeen 3–2 in the final in front of a crowd of 81,000 at Hampden Park.

== Original format ==
The original format of the competition was to include the six Glasgow clubs, with the addition of Hibernian, Hearts, Aberdeen and Dundee.

Following protests on the behalf of clubs that would excluded from the competition at a Scottish Football Association meeting, the proposed format was abandoned and the tournament format would be reconsidered.

== Summary ==
On their road to the final, Celtic had beaten Heart of Midlothian 2–1, Clyde 4–2 in a replay the day after a 4–4 draw in the quarter-finals, and Raith Rovers 3–1 in the semi-finals. In the final, Aberdeen (who had eliminated Rangers, St Mirren and Hibernian) went two goals ahead with goals from Harry Yorston in 14 minutes (Celtic goalkeeper George Hunter was injured in the process, with Bobby Evans taking over between the posts for the next 12 minutes) and Tommy Bogan on 35 minutes after Hunter returned to the field. Charlie Tully changed the game in Celtic's favour in the second half, setting up two Sean Fallon goals and the winner, scored by Jimmy Walsh.

The Glasgow Corporation, who had organised the tournament along with the Glasgow Football Association and provided the cup (named after Glasgow's patron saint) as their donation to the Festival of Britain, were left red-faced when the triumphant players and manager Jimmy McGrory examined the trophy and discovered that it was decorated with ornate life belts and mermaids. It was revealed that the trophy was not in fact new but third-hand, having been made in 1894 as a yachting trophy, then been altered for a football competition in 1912 between Provan Gas Works and a City of Glasgow Police team. Celtic at first demanded a new trophy, but today the St Mungo Cup proudly takes its place in the Celtic Park trophy room.

There was also a tournament for clubs in the lower division, the St Mungo Quaich won by Dumbarton with a win over Ayr United in the final, and a series of friendly matches between Scottish and English clubs, five featuring Ayr United who lost each time.

== Final ==
1 August 1951
19:00

Aberdeen	2–3	Celtic
Yorston 20'; Bogan 35'		Fallon 40', 50'; Walsh 70'

Hampden Park, Glasgow
Attendance: 82,264
Referee: J. Mowat

=== Teams ===
Aberdeen:
GK	Fred Martin
RB	Don Emery
LB	Davie Shaw
RH	Tony Harris
CH	Ken Thomson
LH	Tommy Lowrie
OR	Tommy Bogan
IR	Harry Yorston
CF	George Hamilton
IL	Archie Baird
OL	Jack Hather

Celtic:
GK	George Hunter
RB	Mike Haughney
LB	Alex Rollo
RH	Bobby Evans
CH	Jim Mallan
LH	Joe Baillie
OR	Bobby Collins
IR	Jimmy Walsh
CF	Sean Fallon
IL	Bertie Peacock
OL	Charlie Tully

== See also ==
- 1888 Glasgow Exhibition Cup, similar tournament in 1888
- Glasgow International Exhibition Cup, similar tournament in 1901
- Edinburgh Exhibition Cup, similar tournament in 1908
- Empire Exhibition Trophy, similar tournament in 1938 (also featuring English clubs)
- Coronation Cup (football), similar tournament in 1953 (also featuring English clubs)
