= 1963 FA Cup final =

- Event: 1962–63 FA Cup
Leicester City	Manchester United
1	3
- Date: 25 May 1963
- Venue: Wembley Stadium, London
- Referee: Ken Aston (Ilford)
- Attendance: 99,604

The 1963 FA Cup final was the ultimate match of the 1962–63 FA Cup, the 82nd edition of the first English club football tournament. Having been postponed for three weeks due to a fixture backlog caused by the "Big Freeze" of the winter months, the final was played on 25 May 1963. The venue was Wembley Stadium, which was fully roofed for the first time as part of extensive refurbishments in preparation for the 1966 FIFA World Cup.

The final was won by Manchester United, who defeated Leicester City by three goals to one (3–1). United were playing in their fifth final and achieved their third victory. It was Leicester's third defeat in three final appearances. United led 1–0 at half-time after Denis Law scored their opening goal. In the second half, David Herd scored twice for United, and Ken Keyworth scored for Leicester.

The match was played before a crowd of 99,604 and was broadcast live on BBC Television. The trophy was presented to United captain Noel Cantwell by Queen Elizabeth II.

== Background ==
The 1963 final was the first to be rescheduled. Originally planned for 4 May 1963, it was postponed for three weeks until 25 May in response to the severe winter of 1963, in which the "Big Freeze" played havoc with fixtures. The third round of the competition was due to be played on 5 January but, although a handful of matches were played that day, it was not until 11 March that the round was finally completed.

== Route to the final ==
=== Leicester City ===
Round	Opposition	Score
Third	Grimsby Town (a)	3–1
Fourth	Ipswich Town (h)	3–1
Fifth	Leyton Orient (a)	1–0
Sixth	Norwich City (a)	2–0
Semi-final	Liverpool (n)	1–0
Key: (h) = home venue; (a) = away venue; (n) = neutral venue. Source:

Leicester City entered the competition in the third round. They played in five rounds to reach the final. None of their ties required replays.

==== Early rounds ====
Leicester were drawn away to Grimsby Town in the third round, and the tie was played at Blundell Park on Tuesday, 8 January, having been postponed from the previous Saturday because of snow. Grimsby were in the Second Division and struggling to avoid relegation—they eventually finished 18th, just four points ahead of the relegated teams. Leicester won the tie 3–1 with two goals by Dave Gibson and one by Ken Keyworth.

The fourth round matches were scheduled for 26 January, but the winter weather had caused numerous third round postponements which had a knock-on effect. The fourth round ties were not completed until 19 March. Leicester were able to play their tie on 30 January, again following a four-day postponement. This was their only home tie in the competition and they hosted the reigning Football League champions, Ipswich Town, at Filbert Street. Ipswich had slipped into the lower half of the First Division and were 17th at the end of the season. Leicester, who finished in fourth place, defeated them 3–1. The Leicester goals were scored by Graham Cross and Ken Keyworth (2).

=== Manchester United ===
Round	Opposition	Score
Third	Huddersfield Town (h)	5–0
Fourth	Aston Villa (h)	1–0
Fifth	Chelsea (h)	2–1
Sixth	Coventry City (a)	3–1
Semi-final	Southampton (n)	1–0
Key: (h) = home venue; (a) = away venue; (n) = neutral venue. Source:

Manchester United entered the competition in the third round. They played in five rounds to reach the final. None of their ties required replays.

== Match ==
=== Pre-match ===
The 1963 final was the first to be played at Wembley since construction of the stadium's new roof was completed. It was built in preparation for the 1966 FIFA World Cup.

==== Teams ====
Despite fielding nine internationals United had struggled during the season while their opponents City had performed well, doing the league double over United in the process and thus entered the final as slight favourites.

==== Broadcasting ====
The game was broadcast live on BBC Television as a cup final special edition of Grandstand, making it the 19th cup final to be broadcast live on television. The programme was presented by David Coleman from the pitch side, where he spent the build-up to the game interviewing the players and officials as they walked onto the field an hour before kick-off. He then handed over to commentator Kenneth Wolstenholme, who was acting as the television commentator for his 11th FA Cup final.

The match was broadcast in black and white, so the BBC requested that one team change kit, as the blue of Leicester and red of Manchester United would be indistinguishable to the viewers; Leicester was the team to change, wearing their white away kit. BBC Radio coverage was provided by Raymond Glendenning and Alan Clarke, with a young Brian Moore acting as pitchside reporter.

=== First half ===
The opening fifteen minutes of the game were error strewn and Leicester could easily have found themselves three goals in front as United's goalkeeper, David Gaskell, presented them with three opportunities to fire into an unguarded net. On each occasion, Keyworth, Stringfellow and Gibson in turn were unable to finish the moves off with a last-ditch United challenge keeping the scoreline level.

Having survived the third scare in the fifteenth minute, United took a stranglehold on the match which they never relinquished, peppering Gordon Banks goalmouth with several shots off target before finally taking the lead after half an hour. A Bobby Charlton shot had been saved comfortably by Banks, who then bowled the ball out to Gibson. Paddy Crerand read the throw and raced in to intercept the ball 25 yards from the Leicester goal before passing to Denis Law, who turned and fired past Banks and two defenders to open the scoring. Indeed, Law could have had a second goal ten minutes later when he took the ball around Banks but was unable to steer the ball into the goal under pressure from two defenders.

=== Second half ===
Leicester improved at the start of the second half and were presented with yet another chance by the nervous Gaskell, who dropped the ball at the feet of Cross who was unable to get his shot on target. United though gradually regained their supremacy and deservedly sealed Leicester's fate after 57 minutes when a cross field ball from Giles found Charlton unmarked. He raced into the box and shot at Banks who could only parry the shot into the path of David Herd who tapped into the empty net, triggering victorious choruses of "When the reds go marching in" from the United fans.

Leicester got a lifeline with ten minutes left when a speculative Frank McLintock shot was met by Ken Keyworth, who scored with a well-placed diving header. This raised the tension levels but there remained little sign of a Leicester fightback as United continued to dominate, with Law hitting the post with a header a minute before the game was finally won in the 85th minute. The otherwise competent Banks came for a Giles cross and fumbled the ball into the path of Herd, who turned and fired past two defenders on the goal line to complete the victory.

=== Details ===
25 May 1963

Leicester City	1–3	Manchester United
Keyworth 80'	Report	Law 30'; Herd 57', 85'

Wembley Stadium, London
Attendance: 99,604
Referee: Ken Aston

Leicester City

GK	1	(England) Gordon Banks
RB	2	(Scotland) John Sjoberg
LB	3	(England) Richie Norman
RH	4	(Scotland) Frank McLintock
CH	5	(Scotland) Ian King
LH	6	(England) Colin Appleton (c)
OR	7	(England) Howard Riley
IR	8	(England) Graham Cross
CF	9	(England) Ken Keyworth
IL	10	(Scotland) Dave Gibson
OL	11	(England) Mike Stringfellow
Manager:
(Scotland) Matt Gillies
Linesmen:
Hanley (Staffordshire FA)
Pegg (Cambridgeshire FA)

Manchester United

GK	1	(England) David Gaskell
RB	2	(Republic of Ireland) Tony Dunne
LB	3	(Republic of Ireland) Noel Cantwell (c)
RH	4	(Scotland) Paddy Crerand
CH	5	(England) Bill Foulkes
LH	6	(England) Maurice Setters
OR	7	(Republic of Ireland) Johnny Giles
IR	8	(England) Albert Quixall
CF	9	(Scotland) David Herd
IL	10	(Scotland) Denis Law
OL	11	(England) Bobby Charlton
Manager:
(Scotland) Matt Busby
Match rules
90 minutes
30 minutes of extra time if necessary
Replay if scores still level

== Post-match ==
Queen Elizabeth II presented the trophy to United captain Noel Cantwell.

In those days, the national anthem was played after the cup and medals were presented, but the United players were criticised in the press for not respecting this tradition as they began hoisting Cantwell onto the shoulders of Quixall and Crerand as the band began to play. Nearby journalists had to tell the United players to stop. The playing of the anthem after big matches at Wembley eventually ceased in the 1970s.

BBC commentator Kenneth Wolstenholme speculated that United's victory was as a result of the team's greater match sharpness, having had to play to avoid relegation right to the end of the season, while Leicester had lost their sharpness with nothing to play for in the closing weeks of the season.

Wolstenholme's view was shared by United manager Matt Busby, who felt that his team were a side of "big game players". Noel Cantwell felt that their poor league placing had made it increasingly hard for the team as the season had gone on. Neither Leicester manager Matt Gillies nor captain Colin Appleton offered any excuses, and both merely felt that their side had underperformed on the day and been outplayed by a better team, Appleton adding: "I can't understand how that team (United) finished where they did in the league".

In his book, Mike Collett wrote that United won because Denis Law had the type of game which earned him his nickname—"The King". After opening the scoring, Law "terrorised a Leicester defence in which Gordon Banks had a rare off-day".

Newsreel broadcasts were shown in cinemas on the evening of the match by Pathé and Movietone, both in colour.

== Bibliography ==
- Collett, Mike (2003). The Complete Record of the FA Cup. Cheltenham: SportsBooks Ltd. ISBN 1899807-19-5.
