= 1964 Football League Cup final =

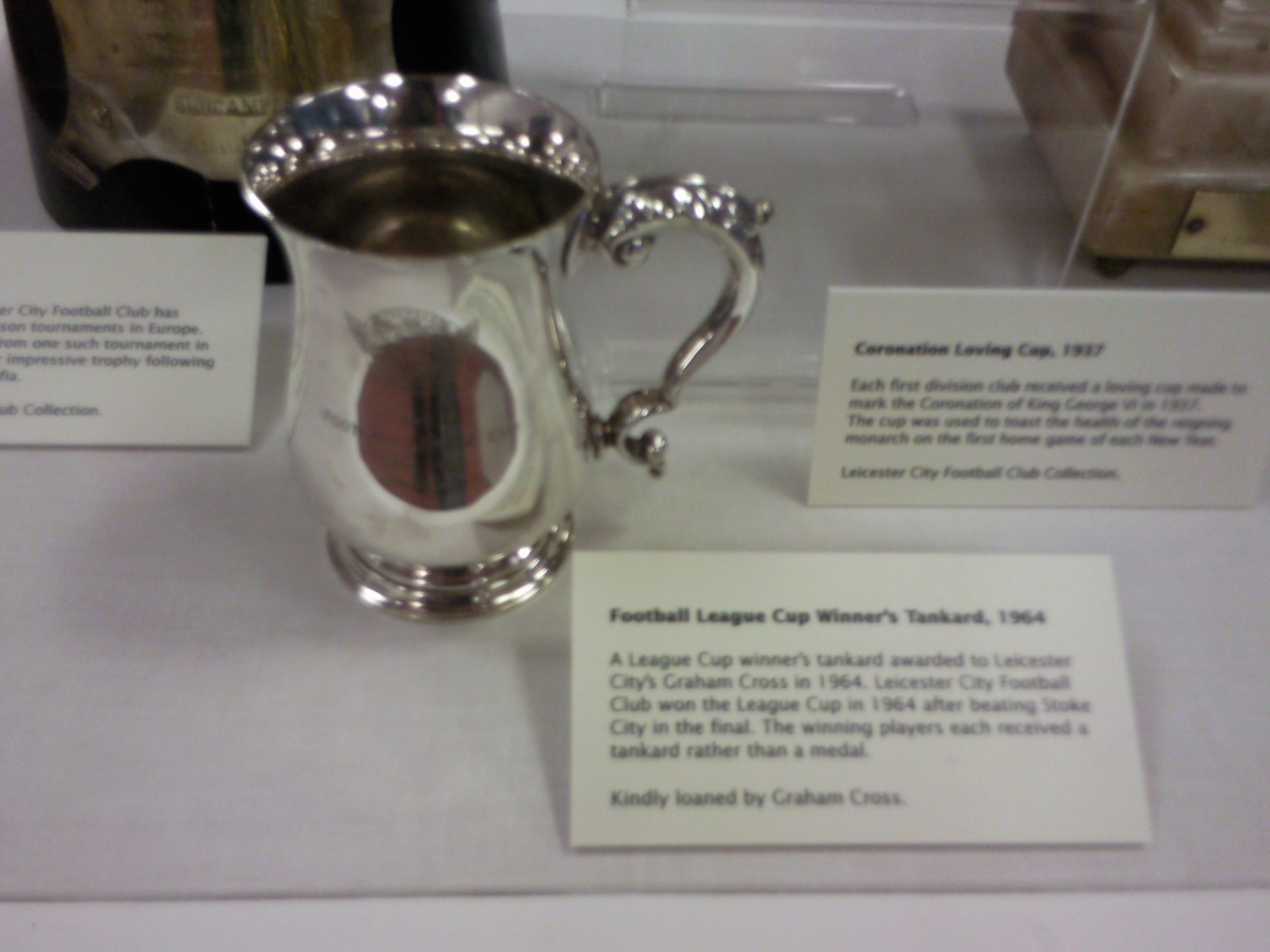
- Winners' tankard awarded to Graham Cross for winning the 1963–64 Football League Cup
- Event: 1963–64 Football League Cup
Stoke City	Leicester City
3	4
- on aggregate

First leg
Stoke City	Leicester City
1	1
- Date: 15 April 1964
- Venue: Victoria Ground, Stoke-on-Trent
- Referee: Bill Clements
- Attendance: 22,309

Second leg
Leicester City	Stoke City
3	2
- Date: 22 April 1964
- Venue: Filbert Street, Leicester
- Referee: A Jobling (Morecambe)
- Attendance: 25,372

The 1964 Football League Cup final, the fourth to be staged since the competition's inception, was contested between Stoke City and Leicester City, both of the First Division, over two legs. Leicester City won 4–3 on aggregate.

== Match review ==
=== First leg ===
The First leg was played at Stoke City's Victoria Ground and was a very exciting encounter. Peter Dobing hit the post early on and John Ritchie had a shot brilliantly cleared off the line by John Sjoberg. After a goalless first half Keith Bebbington broke the deadlock putting Stoke ahead after 62 minutes after Bill Asprey's 30 yard shot was parried by the Leicester 'keeper Gordon Banks, but Bebbington was fastest to the loose ball. In front of a crowd of 22,309 Stoke went out for a second goal but Leicester's defence held firm and against the run of play they got an equaliser. A poor clearance from Eric Skeels rebounded off Terry Heath into the path of Dave Gibson who lobbed the ball over Lawrie Leslie and into the unguarded net to set up a winner takes all 2nd leg.

=== Second leg ===
For the Second leg at Filbert Street Stoke manager Tony Waddington had to change his goalkeeper with Leslie out with an ankle injury Bobby Irvine taking his place. He was unable to prevent Mike Stringfellow from scoring after six minutes following a defensive error. Stoke hit back and a perfect pass from Jimmy McIlroy cut through the Foxes’ defence and Dennis Viollet levelled the scores. This put Stoke into the ascendency but then a nasty leg injury to Calvin Palmer saw him stretchered off and thus put Stoke down to 10 men. Leicester capitalised on the situation and before Palmer was able to get back on the pitch Gibson headed in a Howard Riley corner. With not long left Stoke pushed forward and left a too big a gap in defence and Dave Gibson made it 3–1. Stoke to their credit fought on and pulled one back through George Kinnell but it was too late as Leicester won the tie 3–2 giving them a 4–3 aggregate win and with it the League Cup.

== Details ==
=== First leg ===
15 April 1964

Stoke City	1–1	Leicester City
Bebbington 62'	Report	Gibson 79'

Victoria Ground, Stoke-on-Trent
Attendance: 22,309
Referee: W.Clements

1	(Scotland) Lawrie Leslie
2	(England) Bill Asprey
3	(England) Tony Allen
4	(England) Calvin Palmer
5	(Scotland) George Kinnell
6	(England) Eric Skeels (c)
7	(England) Peter Dobing
8	(England) Dennis Viollet
9	(England) John Ritchie
10	(Northern Ireland) Jimmy McIlroy
11	(England) Keith Bebbington
Manager:
(England) Tony Waddington

1	(England) Gordon Banks
2	(Scotland) John Sjoberg
3	(England) Colin Appleton
4	(Scotland) Max Dougan
5	(England) Ian King
6	(England) Graham Cross
7	(England) Howard Riley
8	(England) Terry Heath
9	(England) Ken Keyworth
10	(Scotland) Dave Gibson
11	(England) Mike Stringfellow (c)
Manager:
(Scotland) Matt Gillies

=== Second leg ===
22 April 1964

Leicester City	3–2	Stoke City
Stringfellow 6'; Gibson 70'; Riley 83'	Report	Viollet 46'; Kinnell 90'

Filbert Street, Leicester
Attendance: 25,372
Referee: A. Jobling

1	(England) Gordon Banks
2	(Scotland) John Sjoberg
3	(England) Colin Appleton
4	(Scotland) Max Dougan
5	(England) Ian King
6	(England) Graham Cross
7	(England) Howard Riley
8	(England) Richie Norman
9	(England) Ken Keyworth
10	(Scotland) Dave Gibson
11	(England) Mike Stringfellow (c)
Manager:
(Scotland) Matt Gillies

1	(Northern Ireland) Bobby Irvine
2	(England) Bill Asprey
3	(England) Tony Allen
4	(England) Calvin Palmer
5	(Scotland) George Kinnell
6	(England) Eric Skeels (c)
7	(England) Peter Dobing
8	(England) Dennis Viollet
9	(England) John Ritchie
10	(Northern Ireland) Jimmy McIlroy
11	(England) Keith Bebbington
Manager
(England) Tony Waddington

== Road to the final ==
Home teams listed first.

=== Stoke City ===
Round 2: Scunthorpe United 2–2 Stoke City

Replay Stoke City 3–3 Scunthorpe United
Second Replay Scunthorpe United 0–1 Stoke City

Round 3: Stoke City 3–0 Bolton Wanderers

Round 4: Stoke City 2–1 Bournemouth & Boscombe Athletic

Quarter final: Stoke City 3–2 Rotherham United

Semifinal, 1st leg: Stoke City 2–0 Manchester City

Semifinal, 2nd leg: Manchester City 1–0 Stoke City

Stoke City won 2–1 on aggregate

=== Leicester City ===
Round 2: Leicester City 2–0 Aldershot

Round 3: Tranmere Rovers 1–2 Leicester City

Round 4: Leicester City 3–1 Gillingham

Quarter final: Norwich City 1–1 Leicester City

Replay Leicester City 2–1 (a.e.t) Norwich City

Semifinal, 1st leg: Leicester City 4–3 West Ham United

Semifinal, 2nd leg: West Ham United 0–2 Leicester City

Leicester City won 6–3 on aggregate
