= Albert Cheesebrough =

English footballer (1935–2020)

Personal information
- Full name: Albert Cheesebrough
- Date of birth: 17 January 1935
- Place of birth: Burnley, England
- Date of death: 2 September 2020 (aged 85)
- Place of death: Southport, England
- Height: 5 ft 6 1/2 in (1.69 m)
- Position: Inside forward

Youth career
- 1950–1951: Burnley

Senior career*
Years	Team	Apps	(Gls)
1951–1959	Burnley	128	(28)
1959–1963	Leicester City	122	(40)
1963–1965	Port Vale	57	(13)
1965–1967	Mansfield Town	24	(0)
Total		331	(81)

International career
1956	England U23	1	(0)
- * Club domestic league appearances and goals

Albert Cheesebrough (17 January 1935 – 2 September 2020) was an English footballer. An inside forward, he scored 81 goals in 331 league games over a 16-year professional career in the Football League.

Turning professional with Burnley in 1951, he spent the next eight years at the club, making 158 appearances in league and cup competitions. Signing with Leicester City in 1959, he went on to play for the "Foxes" in the 1961 FA Cup final. He moved on to Port Vale in 1963, and after recovering from injury, he became the club's top-scorer in 1964–65, before he transferred to Mansfield Town in 1965. He spent two years with Mansfield before he was forced to retire due to injury. He won one cap for the England under-23s in 1956.

== Club career ==
=== Burnley ===
Born in Burnley, Lancashire, Cheesebrough joined Burnley as a 15-year-old in the summer of 1950, after a series of outstanding performances as captain of his school team, Rosegrove, and for representative schoolboy teams at town and county level for Lancashire. He signed on professional terms on his 17th birthday in January 1952, and made his First Division debut against Manchester United three months later, before notching his first senior goal against Chelsea in April 1952. Though he played five games in 1951–52, he featured just once in 1952–53 and then played eight times in 1954–55 after failing to make an appearance in the entirety of the 1953–54 campaign.

After manager Frank Hill was replaced by Alan Brown, Cheesebrough became a regular for the "Clarets" at inside-forward in the 1955–56 season, linking up well on the left-wing with Brian Pilkington. He scored six goals in his 41 appearances. On 7 November 1957, he scored a hat-trick in a 7–3 victory over Leicester City. He finished the 1956–57 season with 12 goals in 45 games. He retained his first-team place under new boss Billy Dougall and bagged 14 goals in 42 games in the 1957–58 season. However, Dougall was replaced by Harry Potts, who favoured up and coming youngster Jimmy Robson ahead of Cheesebrough, limiting him to seven goals and 18 appearances in 1958–59. In total Cheesebrough made 158 appearances, scoring 40 goals, in his nine years at Turf Moor.

=== Leicester City ===
Cheesebrough was sold to Matt Gillies's Leicester City in June 1959 for a fee of £20,000. At Filbert Street, Cheesebrough was the club's top-scorer in 1959–60 with 17 goals in 45 appearances. He then hit 12 goals in 42 games in 1960–61, and was part of the City side who were defeated 2–0 by Tottenham Hotspur in the FA Cup final at Wembley. City had to play most of the game with ten men after Len Chalmers picked up an injury; Cheesebrough later recalled that "the pitch was very tiring so playing with 10 men was very hard". He scored 11 goals in 26 games in 1961–62, as City posted a 14th-place finish in the league. He played in the European Cup Winners' Cup against Glenavon and eventual winners Atlético Madrid. He hit three goals in 25 games in 1962–63. He was not included in the "Foxes" side that lost to Manchester United in the 1963 FA Cup final.

=== Port Vale ===
Cheesebrough moved to Freddie Steele's Port Vale for a then club record fee of £15,000 in July 1963. He opened his account at Vale Park with a hat-trick in a 3–0 win over Brentford on 16 September. In November of that year however, he underwent a cartilage operation, and his recovery kept him out of action for the rest of the 1963–64 season; he scored seven goals in 27 games that season. He proved his determination by returning to fitness in the 1964–65 season and finishing as the club's top-scorer, though with a total of seven goals in 32 games it was the first time since David Bowcock in 1917–18 that such a low total earned a player this accolade. The "Valiants" scored just 41 goals all season long, and the arrival of Jackie Mudie could not prevent an inevitable relegation out of the Third Division.

=== Mansfield Town ===
Cheesebrough moved to Mansfield Town on a free transfer in July 1965. The "Stags" were managed by former teammate Tommy Cummings. He made 24 Third Division appearances at Field Mill in 1965–66 and 1966–67, before a broken leg ended his career.

== International career ==
He also made one appearance for England at Under-23 level against France at Ashton Gate in 1956.

== Post-retirement and family ==
After retiring from the game, Cheesebrough ran a butcher's shop business in Southport; he had learned the ropes of the meat trade whilst playing at Port Vale.

His daughter, Susan, represented Great Britain at the Summer Olympics in 1976 and 1980 as a gymnast, and was British national champion in 1978 and 1979. His grandfather, also named Albert Cheesebrough, was killed by sniper fire shortly after the Second Battle of Krithia in World War I.

Cheesebrough died in Southport on 2 September 2020, aged 85.

== Career statistics ==
Appearances and goals by club, season and competition
Club	Season	League			FA Cup		Other		Total	
Club	Season	Division	Apps	Goals	Apps	Goals	Apps	Goals	Apps	Goals
Burnley	1951–52	First Division	5	1	0	0	0	0	5	1
Burnley	1952–53	First Division	1	0	0	0	0	0	1	0
Burnley	1953–54	First Division	0	0	0	0	0	0	0	0
Burnley	1954–55	First Division	7	0	1	0	0	0	8	0
Burnley	1955–56	First Division	35	6	6	0	0	0	41	6
Burnley	1956–57	First Division	40	8	5	4	0	0	45	12
Burnley	1957–58	First Division	40	13	2	1	0	0	42	14
Burnley	Total		128	28	14	5	0	0	142	33
Leicester City	1959–60	First Division	41	15	4	2	0	0	45	17
Leicester City	1960–61	First Division	35	11	5	0	2	1	42	12
Leicester City	1961–62	First Division	23	11	2	0	1	0	26	11
Leicester City	1962–63	First Division	23	3	0	0	2	0	25	3
Leicester City	Total		122	40	11	2	5	1	138	43
Port Vale	1963–64	Third Division	25	6	1	1	1	0	27	7
Port Vale	1964–65	Third Division	32	7	0	0	0	0	32	7
Port Vale	Total		57	13	1	1	1	0	59	14
Mansfield Town	1965–66	Third Division	20	0	1	0	2	0	23	0
Mansfield Town	1966–67	Third Division	4	0	1	0	1	0	6	0
Mansfield Town	Total		24	0	2	0	3	0	29	0
Career total			331	81	28	8	9	1	368	90

== Honours ==
Leicester City

- FA Cup runner-up: 1960–61
