= Frank Gardner =

Frank Gardner may refer to:

- Frank Gardner (journalist) (born 1961), British journalist
- Frank Gardner (racing driver) (1930–2009), Australian racing driver
- Frank Gardner (politician) (1872–1937), U.S. Representative from Indiana
- Frank Gardner (footballer), English footballer
- Frank "Sprig" Gardner, wrestling coach

== See also ==
- Francis Gardner (1771–1835), U.S. Representative from New Hampshire
- Frank Gardner Moore (1865–1955), American Latin scholar
- Frank Gardiner (1830–1904), Australian bushranger
