= Bert Johnson (footballer, born 1916) =

English footballer, manager, and coach

Personal information
- Full name: William Herbert Johnson
- Date of birth: 4 June 1916
- Place of birth: Stockton-on-Tees, England
- Date of death: 30 June 2009 (aged 93)
- Place of death: Evington, Kent, England
- Position: Wing half

Senior career*
Years	Team	Apps	(Gls)
1945–1946	Spennymoor United		
1946–1953	Charlton Athletic	142	(1)
1953–1955	Bexleyheath & Welling		
1955–1959	Cambridge United		

Managerial career
- 1953–1955: Bexleyheath & Welling
- 1955–1959: Cambridge United
- 1959–1968: Leicester City (assistant manager)
- * Club domestic league appearances and goals

William Herbert Johnson (4 June 1916 – 30 June 2009), was an English football player, manager, and coach who played as a wing half in the Football League. He played in both the 1946 FA Cup Final for Charlton Athletic.

Matt Gillies brought Johnson on as a coach at Leicester City in 1959. He was originally signed as head scout, but soon become Gillies' assistant manager. He was influential in the signing of both Dave Gibson and Mike Stringfellow, both of whom would become key figure in Leicester's success during the 1960s. Johnson is often credited as having come up with a tactical innovation of switching the positions of Frank McLintock and Graham Cross, upsetting the traditional 1–11 formation. This hugely influenced Liverpool manager Bill Shankly.

Gillies said on the innovation: "confused opposition" as opposition players would often be asked to mark "our [Leicester's] number eight, so they thought Cross was their man, when McLintock had replaced him" as "players hadn't got beyond thinking about numbers then."

== Honours ==
Charlton Athletic

- FA Cup: 1946–47; runner-up: 1945–46
