= Matt Gillies =

Scottish footballer (1921–1998)

Personal information
- Full name: Matthew Muirhead Gillies
- Date of birth: 12 August 1921
- Place of birth: Loganlea, West Lothian, Scotland
- Date of death: 24 December 1998 (aged 77)
- Place of death: Nottingham, England
- Position: Defender

Senior career*
Years	Team	Apps	(Gls)
?	Motherwell	?	
1945-1946	→ Queens Park Rangers (guest)	2	
1946–1952	Bolton Wanderers	145	(1)
1952–1955	Leicester City	103	(0)
Total		248	(1)

Managerial career
- 1958–1968: Leicester City
- 1969–1972: Nottingham Forest
- * Club domestic league appearances and goals

Matthew Muirhead Gillies (12 August 1921 – 24 December 1998) was a Scottish football player and manager who played for, captained, coached and managed Leicester City for a total of 15 years between 1952–1955 and 1956–1968. He is the club's longest serving manager, lasting a decade in the manager's seat between November 1958 and November 1968. He took charge of Leicester for a club record 508 matches, after making 111 appearances for the club as a player.

He was manager of the Leicester side nicknamed the "Ice Kings", which chased the double in 1962–63.

== Playing career ==
Gillies played for R.A.F. Weeton, Bolton Wanderers and Leicester City, making a total of 248 appearances in the Football League.

== Managerial career ==
=== Leicester City ===
Gillies took a brief break from football after finishing his playing career at Leicester in the summer of 1955, but returned to the club less than a year later to become part of the club's coaching staff under Dave Halliday in April 1956, before being made the club's manager on 1 November 1958.

In 1959, Gillies signed then-unknown 22-year-old goalkeeper Gordon Banks from Chesterfield for £7,000. He also signed club stalwarts Dave Gibson, Mike Stringfellow, Lenny Glover and Derek Dougan. He was known as a fine nurturer and scout of young talent, bringing along Peter Shilton, Frank McLintock, Graham Cross and David Nish from the club's reserves.

Gillies took over the Foxes on 8 November 1958 as they sat bottom of the First Division and amidst fan unrest after his predecessor Dave Halliday had recently sold star striker Arthur Rowley to Shrewsbury Town. He brought in Bert Johnson as his assistant and head scout and the pair would embark in arguably the most successful period in the club's history.

Gillies managed to keep Leicester up in his first season, but could only manage the signings of Albert Cheesebrough and Gordon Banks (originally signed as back-up) in the summer of 1959, as the majority of his transfer bids were rebuffed, while scouting missions to watch the young Huddersfield Town striker Denis Law saw him give an unimpressive performance on two separate occasions and Leicester again struggled at the beginning of the season. However, an injury to first choice goalkeeper Dave MacLaren in September saw Banks come in as his replacement and within a month he had established himself as the first-choice goalkeeper. Gillies also promoted a young Frank McLintock from the reserves around the same time and although both players made an instant impact and were being touted as stars of the future, it took until December until Leicester's season picked up, eventually finishing in a very respectable 12th position.

Leicester continued to improve under Gillies and the following season, they finished 6th in the league, the club's highest league finish since finishing league runners-up in 1928–29. The club also reached the 1961 FA Cup final in which they faced a Tottenham Hotspur side chasing the double. Gillies made the sensational decision to drop striker Ken Leek, who had scored in every round of Leicester's cup run, due to his drinking problems. In the final itself Len Chalmers received an injury early in the game and had to hobble for the remaining 70 minutes or so, meaning Leicester were effectively down to ten men, and Leicester lost 2–0 as Tottenham clinched the double. Though this did mean Leicester had qualified for Europe for the first time in their history. The club were knocked out in the first round of the European Cup Winners' Cup though, losing 3–1 on aggregate to eventual winners Atlético Madrid after beating Glenavon 7–3 on aggregate in the preliminary round.

Two seasons later, in 1962–63, in what is considered Gillies' and often the club's peak, Leicester remarkably chased the double themselves, not only did they reach the FA Cup final but they also sat top of the First Division with just five games to go. The worst winter for two decades led to a plethora of games being postponed. During these postponements Leicester quietly climbed the league in a then club record eighteen-match unbeaten run earning them the nickname in the national press of "the ice-kings". On Tuesday, 16 April 1963, 37,000 fans saw Leicester beat Manchester United 4–3 at Filbert Street, with Denis Law and Ken Keyworth both netting hat-tricks (Law's hat-trick included an "outrageous bicycle kick" and Keyworth's was scored in just six minutes) to send Leicester top of the league. However, injuries, possibly feigned in precaution of the upcoming FA Cup final took their toll and Leicester's depleted squad gained just a single point from their remaining five games to slip down to 4th, then to add to the disappointment lost the FA Cup final 3–1 to the Manchester United side they had beaten just a month earlier.

However, there was some consolidation a season later to club's disappointment in missing out on the FA Cup and the league title, albeit in a less prestigious guise. The club won its first major trophy after beating Stoke City in the 1964 Football League Cup final 4–3 on aggregate. Though they tasted yet another cup final defeat a year later as they reached the League Cup final for the second season running, but lost 3–2 on aggregate to Chelsea.

Contract disputes with several of the club's star players however marred the 1964–65 season. Though most of the disputes were resolved, the loss of hugely influential Frank McLintock to Arsenal for a then club record incoming fee of £80,000 and the unrest over pay saw Leicester slump to 18th in the league.

The signing of Derek Dougan for £21,000 from Peterborough United and Jackie Sinclair from Dunfermline for £25,000 the following summer though saw the club rejuvenated and again become a strong force in the First Division.

However, having just celebrated victory in the 1966 World Cup and having cemented a reputation as being one of the world's foremost goalkeepers, Gordon Banks was under pressure from upcoming youth star Peter Shilton. Shilton wanted first team football and realised that with Banks in the side this was unlikely, so he requested a transfer. However, Gillies controversially decided to sell Banks to Stoke City instead and promoted Shilton to first choice. Just a month earlier he had also accepted an offer from Wolverhampton Wanderers for star striker Derek Dougan.

The sales of Banks and Dougan saw the club decline and although the signings of Lenny Glover and Allan Clarke (the latter for a British transfer record of £110,000) showed promise, a bout of tuberculosis and ill health saw Gillies forced to spend time away from the game and his assistant Bert Johnson took over team affairs between January and March 1968. The illness took its toll on Gillies though and saw his managerial abilities wain and on 28 November 1968, with the club sitting 17th in the league the board sacked his assistant Bert Johnson and first team coach George Dewis. Gillies resigned in protest. His resignation was officially announced at 16:00 on 30 November 1968, exactly ten years and 21 days after taking the job.

=== Nottingham Forest ===
In 1969, he became manager of Nottingham Forest and remained in charge of the club until 1972. Though his spell at Forest was ultimately disappointing and ended shortly after relegation in October 1972, he did sign John Robertson and Martin O'Neill for the club, both of whom would star for Forest in their European triumphs under Brian Clough.

== Death ==
He died in Nottingham on Christmas Eve 1998 at the age of 77. A minute's silence was held in his honour before Leicester's following home fixture with Blackburn Rovers.

== Influence ==
Despite his Leicester side often falling at the final hurdle and thus the relative lack of honours, Gillies was regarded as being ahead of his time in terms of his tactical ability, and was held in high regard by the likes of Matt Busby and particularly Bill Shankly. Shankly once said of Gillies' side: "There's only one team to beware of and that's Leicester City." Shankly watched Gillies' Leicester side, while Liverpool were still in the Second Division and was greatly influenced by his tactics.

Gillies and Johnson were one of the first managerial teams in England to experiment with practicing set pieces in training and his switching of Frank McLintock at right-half and Graham Cross at inside-right mid-game, proved revolutionary. Gillies saying it "confused opposition" as opposition players would often be asked to mark "our [Leicester's] number eight, so they thought Cross was their man, when McLintock had replaced him" as "players hadn't got beyond thinking about numbers then." Shankly later copied this trick as his Liverpool side were promoted to the First Division and went on to win First Division titles.

== Honours ==
=== As a player ===
Leicester City

- Football League Second Division: 1953–54

=== As a manager ===
Leicester City

- Football League Cup: 1963–64; runner-up: 1964–65
- FA Cup runner-up: 1960–61, 1962–63
