= Bobby Evans (footballer) =

Scottish footballer & manager (1927–2001)

- Evans playing for Scotland in 1959

Personal information
- Full name: Robert Evans
- Date of birth: 16 July 1927
- Place of birth: Glasgow, Scotland
- Date of death: 1 September 2001 (aged 74)
- Place of death: Airdrie, Scotland
- Height: 1.73 m (5 ft 8 in)
- Positions: Right half; centre half

Senior career*
| Years | Team | Apps | (Gls) |
| – | Pollok | | |
| – | St Anthony's | | |
| 1944–1960 | Celtic | 537 | (11) |
| 1960–1961 | Chelsea | 32 | (0) |
| 1961–1962 | Newport County | 31 | (0) |
| 1962–1963 | Greenock Morton | 31 | (0) |
| 1963–1965 | Third Lanark | 7 | (1) |
| 1965–1968 | Raith Rovers | 78 | (0) |
| Total | | 563 | (12) |

International career
| 1948–1960 | Scotland | 48 | (0) |
| 1948–1960 | Scottish Football League XI | 25 | (0) |
| 1958 | SFL trial v SFA | 1 | (0) |
| 1959 | SFA trial v SFL | 1 | (0) |

Managerial career
- 1961–1962: Newport County
- 1964–1965: Third Lanark
- * Club domestic league appearances and goals

Robert Evans (16 July 1927 – 1 September 2001) was a Scottish football player and manager, most notable for his time with Celtic.

== Career ==
Evans began playing football for Glasgow Junior side Pollok. He then joined Celtic during 1944 from another Glasgow junior side St. Anthony's. He started out as a forward, but it was not until manager Jimmy McGrory moved him back to right half that Evans became a Celtic great.

Celtic's long-awaited Scottish Cup victory of 1951 and the historic Saint Mungo Cup win of the same summer gave Evans his first taste of major success. He then went on to give the sustained performance of a lifetime throughout the unexpectedly triumphant Coronation Cup run two years later. In the final, Evans played the great Lawrie Reilly out of the game and instigated the move that led to Jimmy Walsh's clinching strike in the 2–0 defeat of favourites Hibernian.

Evans was the first Celtic captain to lift the Scottish League Cup in 1956 and he famously helped defend it a year later against Rangers in the final that became known as Hampden in the Sun. He made 535 appearances for Celtic and scored 10 goals in 16 years with the club. During this time he won 48 caps for Scotland. Evans also won 25 caps for the Scottish Football League XI, the most of any player.

Evans left Celtic in 1960, heading south to Chelsea, where he played for one season before being appointed player-manager of Newport County. He returned to Scotland in a playing capacity with Greenock Morton in 1962, then joined Third Lanark as a player with coaching duties in 1963. He was promoted to manager in June 1964 but left after a difficult 1964–65 season. He played with Raith Rovers for two further years. He played for them as they won promotion from Division Two to Division One in 1967 before retiring at the end of that year, at the age of 39.

Evans died of pneumonia in 2001, after suffering for several years with dementia and Parkinson's disease. In 2008 he was posthumously inducted to the Scottish Football Hall of Fame.

== Career statistics ==
=== International appearances ===
Scotland national team
| Year | Apps | Goals |
|---|---|---|
| 1948 | 2 | 0 |
| 1949 | 4 | 0 |
| 1950 | 3 | 0 |
| 1951 | 2 | 0 |
| 1953 | 3 | 0 |
| 1954 | 4 | 0 |
| 1955 | 6 | 0 |
| 1956 | 2 | 0 |
| 1957 | 5 | 0 |
| 1958 | 6 | 0 |
| 1959 | 6 | 0 |
| 1960 | 5 | 0 |
| Total | 48 | 0 |

== Honours ==
Celtic

- Scottish Division A: 1953–54
- Scottish Cup: 1950–51, 1953–54
- Scottish League Cup: 1956–57, 1957–58
- Saint Mungo Cup: 1951–52
- Coronation Cup: 1953
- Glasgow Cup: 1948–49, 1955–56
- Glasgow Charity Cup: 1949–50, 1952–53, 1958–59
- Victory in Europe Cup: 1945

Scotland

- British Home Championship: 1948–49, 1955–56, 1959–60

Individual

- Rex Kingsley Footballer of the Year: 1953

== See also ==
- List of footballers in Scotland by number of league appearances (500+)
- List of Scotland national football team captains

| Preceded by Jock Stein | Celtic F.C. captain 1956–1957 | Succeeded by Bertie Peacock |
