= Joe Baillie =

Scottish footballer

Personal information
- Full name: Joseph Baillie
- Date of birth: 26 February 1929
- Place of birth: Dumfries, Scotland
- Date of death: 23 March 1966 (aged 37)
- Place of death: Glasgow, Scotland
- Position: Defender

Youth career
- St Roch's

Senior career*
Years	Team	Apps	(Gls)
1946–1954	Celtic	107	(0)
1954–1956	Wolverhampton Wanderers	1	(0)
1956–1957	Bristol City	10	(0)
1957–1960	Leicester City	75	(0)
1960–1961	Bradford Park Avenue	7	(1)

International career
1951–1952	Scottish League XI	3	(0)
- * Club domestic league appearances and goals

Joe Baillie (26 February 1929 – 23 March 1966) was a Scottish footballer who played as a defender, making over 100 appearances for Celtic before moving to English football.

== Career ==
Baillie played the majority of his games for Celtic for whom his debut was against Queen of the South. He was best known at Celtic for his partnership at left-half with Celtic legend Bobby Evans which helped the team lift the 1951 Scottish Cup. He had joined the club in 1946 and remained with the Bhoys for eight years. He made 171 first team appearances for Celtic, scoring one goal. During his time with Celtic, Baillie represented the Scottish League XI three times.

In 1954 he moved south to join then-English champions Wolverhampton Wanderers. However at Molineux he managed only one first team appearance (a 6–4 win against Huddersfield in February 1955).

He moved to Bristol City in 1956 where he had an equally brief stay.

He next again gave him regular football when he joined Leicester City in summer 1957. His manager when he joined Leicester was another Scot, Dumfries born Dave Halliday. Leicester stayed in England's top flight through Baillie's three seasons there.

He ended his playing career by contributing to a promotion-winning season at Fourth Division Bradford Park Avenue before retiring in 1961.

== Death ==
He drowned after his car crashed into the bridge over the River Kelvin in the Maryhill district of Glasgow in March 1966.

== Honours ==
- Celtic - 1951 Scottish Cup winners
- Bradford Park Avenue - 1961 Fourth Division promotion
