= 1961 FA Cup final =

- Event: 1960–61 FA Cup
Leicester City	Tottenham Hotspur
0	2
- Date: 6 May 1961
- Venue: Wembley Stadium, London
- Referee: John Kelly (Eccleston)
- Attendance: 100,000

The 1961 FA Cup final was the 80th final of the FA Cup. It took place on 6 May 1961 at Wembley Stadium and was contested between Leicester City and Tottenham Hotspur.

Tottenham won the match 2–0, with Bobby Smith and Terry Dyson scoring the goals. Having already won the League, Spurs became the first club to achieve the Double since Aston Villa in 1897.

== Road to Wembley ==
=== Leicester City ===
Home teams listed first.

Round 3 Leicester City 3–1 Oxford United

Round 4 Leicester City 5–1 Bristol City

Round 5 Birmingham City 1–1 Leicester City

Replay Leicester City 2–1 Birmingham City

Round 6 Leicester City 0–0 Barnsley

Replay Barnsley 1–2 Leicester City (a.e.t.)

Semi-final Leicester City 0–0 Sheffield United (at Elland Road, Leeds)

Replay Leicester City 0–0 Sheffield United (a.e.t.) (at City Ground, Nottingham)
2nd Replay Leicester City 2–0 Sheffield United (a.e.t.) (at St Andrew's, Birmingham)

=== Tottenham Hotspur ===
Home teams listed first.

Round 3 Tottenham Hotspur 3–2 Charlton Athletic

Round 4 Tottenham Hotspur 5–1 Crewe Alexandra

Round 5 Aston Villa 0–2 Tottenham Hotspur

Round 6 Sunderland 1–1 Tottenham Hotspur

Replay Tottenham Hotspur 5–0 Sunderland

Semi-final Tottenham Hotspur 3–0 Burnley (at Villa Park, Birmingham)

== Match summary ==
Leicester frustrated Tottenham Hotspur in the early exchanges but when full-back Len Chalmers damaged his right leg twenty minutes into the match, Tottenham looked to capitalise. They were unfortunate to see Cliff Jones' goal disallowed for offside in the 38th minute and the first half ended goalless.

The second half kicked off in the same vein as the first had ended until the deadlock was broken in the 66th minute. England striker Bobby Smith latched on to a pass from Terry Dyson, turned neatly and smashed the ball past Gordon Banks. The goal naturally lifted Spurs and nine minutes later victory was sealed, when Smith returned the compliment and crossed to Dyson to head home the second to complete the Double.

== Coverage ==
The match was broadcast live by the BBC with live coverage to twelve other European countries. In the United Kingdom the match commentator was Kenneth Wolstenholme, former player Walley Barnes was also pitchside with a radio cameraman to capture the atmosphere before the game and also interview the players during the buildup. He was called upon only once during the match itself to comment on the injury to Chalmers. Many other countries broadcast either a full delayed match cast or edited highlights. The telecast was shown in its entirety in the United States by the American Broadcasting Company (ABC) on Wide World of Sports two weeks later on 20 May. The contest was the first overseas event to appear on the sports anthology series. The Chalmers storyline was played up to the point that "Poor old Chalmers" became a familiar phrase among fans of the television program.

Almost all the television, radio and newspaper commentators predicted a comfortable Tottenham victory but in post game reports all agreed that Spurs had looked out of sorts during the opening fifteen minutes and it was only when Chalmers was injured that they began to dominate the game, again leading to cries for the introduction of substitutes in future. For their part Leicester were considered a little unlucky, though few reporters were willing to go as far as to say that the result would have been any different had the injury to Chalmers not occurred.

Chalmers himself left the field with ten minutes of the game remaining, at which point Tottenham were comfortably in front and any likely chance of a Leicester victory had evaporated. He was unable to return to collect his loser's medal.

The match was broadcast in black and white as a cup final special edition of the Saturday afternoon sports programme Grandstand however cinema viewers experienced a first when the traditional pre movie newsreels of both Pathé and Movietone broadcast their match reports in colour.

== Match details ==
6 May 1961

Leicester City	0–2	Tottenham Hotspur
	(Report)	Smith 66'; Dyson 75'

Wembley, London
Attendance: 100,000
Referee: J. Kelly

Leicester City	Tottenham Hotspur

1	(England) Gordon Banks
2	(England) Len Chalmers
3	(England) Richie Norman
4	(Scotland) Frank McLintock
5	(Scotland) Ian King
6	(England) Colin Appleton
7	(England) Howard Riley
8	(Scotland) Jimmy Walsh (c)
9	(Scotland) Hughie McIlmoyle
10	(England) Ken Keyworth
11	(England) Albert Cheesebrough
Manager:
(Scotland) Matt Gillies

1	(Scotland) Bill Brown
2	(England) Peter Baker
3	(England) Ron Henry
4	(Northern Ireland) Danny Blanchflower (c)
5	(England) Maurice Norman
6	(Scotland) Dave Mackay
7	(Wales) Cliff Jones
8	(Scotland) John White
9	(England) Bobby Smith
10	(England) Les Allen
11	(England) Terry Dyson
Manager:
(England) Bill Nicholson

Match rules

- 90 minutes.
- 30 minutes of extra-time if necessary.
- Replay if scores still level.
