= Coronation Cup (football) =

1953 British tournament in Glasgow

The Coronation Cup was a one-off football tournament to celebrate the coronation of Queen Elizabeth II, between four English and four Scottish clubs, held in Glasgow in May 1953. This tournament, like the Empire Exhibition Trophy, was held in very high regard by football clubs, as at the time it allowed teams to test themselves against teams from another country in the days before European football.

Celtic and Hibernian met in the final at Hampden Park, Celtic coming out the winners 2–0 before 117,000 spectators. Celtic's victory meant that they became the unofficial champions of Britain.

== Entrants ==
Team	Achievement
(Scotland) Aberdeen	1952–53 Scottish Cup runners-up
(Scotland) Celtic	1938 Empire Exhibition Trophy winners (unofficial reigning British champions)
(Scotland) Hibernian	1952–53 Scottish Division One runners-up
(Scotland) Rangers	1952–53 Scottish Division One champions and Scottish Cup winners
(England) Arsenal	1952–53 First Division champions
(England) Manchester United	1951–52 First Division champions
(England) Newcastle United	1950–51 and 1951–52 FA Cup winners
(England) Tottenham Hotspur	1951–52 First Division runners-up

== Quarter-finals ==
- (Scotland) Celtic 1 – 0 (England) Arsenal
- (England) Manchester United 2 – 1 (Scotland) Rangers
- (England) Newcastle United 4 – 0 (Scotland) Aberdeen
- (Scotland) Hibernian 1 – 1 (a.e.t.) (England) Tottenham Hotspur

Replay

- (Scotland) Hibernian 2 – 1 (a.e.t.) (England) Tottenham Hotspur

== Semi-finals ==
- (Scotland) Celtic 2 – 1 (England) Manchester United
- (Scotland) Hibernian 4 – 0 (England) Newcastle United

== Final ==
20 May 1953
19:00

Celtic (Scotland)	2–0	(Scotland) Hibernian
Mochan 28'; Walsh 87'

Hampden Park, Glasgow
Attendance: 117,060
Referee: H. Phillips

Celtic
Hibernian

GK	John Bonnar
RB	Mike Haughney
LB	Alex Rollo
RH	Bobby Evans
CH	Jock Stein (c)
LH	John McPhail
OR	Bobby Collins
IR	Jimmy Walsh
CF	Neil Mochan
IL	Bertie Peacock
OL	Willie Fernie

GK	Tommy Younger
RB	Jock Govan
LB	Jock Paterson
RH	Archie Buchanan
CH	Hugh Howie
LH	Bobby Combe
OR	Gordon Smith
IR	Bobby Johnstone
CF	Lawrie Reilly (c)
IL	Eddie Turnbull
OL	Willie Ormond

== See also ==
- Glasgow International Exhibition Cup, similar tournament in 1901
- 1888 Glasgow Exhibition Cup, similar tournament in 1888
- Edinburgh Exhibition Cup, similar tournament in 1908
- Empire Exhibition Trophy, similar tournament in 1938
- Saint Mungo Cup, similar tournament in 1951
