= Terry Heath =

English footballer

Personal information
- Full name: Richard Terence Heath
- Date of birth: 17 November 1943
- Place of birth: Leicester, England
- Date of death: 25 January 2011 (aged 67)
- Place of death: Spain
- Position: Midfielder

Senior career*
Years	Team	Apps	(Gls)
1962–1964	Leicester City	8	(2)
1964–1968	Hull City	31	(1)
1967–1973	Scunthorpe United	176	(50)
1972–1974	Lincoln City	17	(1)
Total		232	(54)
- * Club domestic league appearances and goals

Richard Terence Heath (17 November 1943 – 25 January 2011) was an English footballer, who played for Leicester City, Hull City, Scunthorpe United and Lincoln City.

== Playing career ==
=== Leicester City ===
Terry Heath joined his hometown club Leicester City as an apprentice in 1961, making his Football League debut in the 2–0 home win against West Ham United on 10 November 1962. He made four further appearances during the season scoring twice, his first goal coming in the 4–3 home victory over Manchester United on 16 April 1963.

The following season he made just three League appearances but did play in the first leg of the 1964 Football League Cup final, a 1–1 draw at Stoke City on 15 April 1964. Leicester's 3–2 victory in the second leg one week later secured them the trophy.

The League Cup appearance would prove to be his last for the Foxes as during the summer of 1964 he linked up with Hull City for a fee of £8,000.

=== Hull City ===
His spell at Boothferry Park was a frustrating one as he struggled to establish himself in the first team, making just 31 Football League appearances for the club in four seasons before moving on, in March 1968, to join Scunthorpe United for a fee of £5,000.

=== Scunthorpe United ===
He made an immediate impact at The Old Showground, scoring on his debut in a 5–1 victory over Colchester United and going on to score five goals in 12 appearances though Scunthorpe finished bottom of Division 3.

Apart from injury, he was to be a regular in the side for five seasons, becoming a crowd favourite for his surging runs from deep positions and his explosive shot and finishing top scorer for the club in both the 1968/69 and 1970/71 seasons with 15 and 10 goals respectively. The 1971/72 season saw Scunthorpe United promoted but Heath was missing from the team with a groin injury from December onwards.

=== Lincoln City ===
In February 1973 Heath joined Lincoln City on loan, debuting in the 1–0 home victory over Darlington on 28 February 1973: a victory noted for being the first managerial win for Graham Taylor. He went on to play nine games for the club that season, scoring once in the 2–0 victory at Mansfield Town on 31 March, before a knee injury ended his season.

In the summer of 1973, a fee of £2,000 secured his services on a permanent basis However, having started City's first two games of the season, an injury to his other knee caused him to be out of action from the end of August until the middle of February. Despite returning for seven games he was advised to retire from the game; a testimonial game being held for him on 1 March 1976 when 5,292 spectators saw the Imps defeat Ipswich Town 1–0.

== Retirement ==
After his enforced retirement he worked as a storeman in Lincoln and then at Scunthorpe steelworks before moving to Newquay where he ran a guesthouse as well as earning a reputation for oil painting with a particular fondness for painting nature and wildlife.

He later moved to Spain, becoming an honorary member of the Quesada bowls club in Ciudad Quesada, Rojales, Alicante before his death on 25 January 2011 following a long illness.

== Honours ==
Leicester City

- Football League Cup: 1963–64
