= Alex Rollo =

Scottish footballer and manager (1926 – 2004)

Personal information
- Full name: Alexander Rollo
- Date of birth: 18 September 1926
- Place of birth: Dumbarton, Scotland
- Date of death: 5 October 2004 (aged 78)
- Place of death: Workington, England
- Position: Left back

Youth career
- –1948: Ashfield
- 1948–1951: Celtic

Senior career*
Years	Team	Apps	(Gls)
1951–1954	Celtic	37	(1)
1954–1956	Kilmarnock	50	(0)
1956–1957	Dumbarton	32	(4)
1957–1960	Workington	127	(3)
1960–1961	Sligo Rovers	?	(?)
Total		246 +	(8 +)

International career
1951	Scottish League XI	1	(0)

Managerial career
- 1960–1961: Sligo Rovers
- * Club domestic league appearances and goals

Alex Rollo (18 September 1926 – 5 October 2004) was a Scottish football player and manager. Rollo won the Coronation Cup with Celtic, effectively marking Hibs winger Gordon Smith. He also won the Scottish Cup in 1951 and represented the Scottish League.
