= Jack Lornie =

Scottish footballer

Personal information
- Date of birth: 2 March 1939
- Place of birth: Aberdeen, Scotland
- Date of death: 16 December 2014 (aged 75)
- Place of death: Inverness, Scotland
- Position: Inside forward

Youth career
- Banks O'Dee

Senior career*
Years	Team	Apps	(Gls)
1958–1961	Leicester City	8	(3)
1961–1963	Luton Town	19	(6)
1963–1964	Carlisle United	4	(0)
1964–1966	Tranmere Rovers	35	(7)
- Ross County
Total		66	(16)
- * Club domestic league appearances and goals

Jack Lornie (2 March 1939 – 16 December 2014) was a Scottish footballer who played as an inside forward in the Football League for Leicester City, Luton Town, Carlisle United and Tranmere Rovers. When Lornie finished his career in the English leagues, he moved back to his native Scotland in the summer of 1966 and signed for Dingwall-based, Scottish Highland Football League Club, Ross County FC (Now an established Scottish Premier League Club). Lornie spent circa 10 years at Ross County where he finished as First Team Coach. When Jack was freed by Carlisle United in June 1964, he was about to sign on a part-time basis for Inverness Caledonian FC in the Scottish Highland Football League, however, Tranmere Rovers stepped in which gave Jack another two seasons on a full-time basis in the English Football League.
