= William Clark (football manager) =

Scottish football manager

William Clark was a Scottish football manager and secretary of Leicester City in the late Victorian era.

He was Leicester City manager from 1896 to 1897, for 30 games, of which the side won 13, lost 13 and drew the other 4. Remaining at the club in the following season he was suspended from his role for financial irregularities that contravened FA regulations in 1898.
