= George Hunter (footballer, born 1930) =

Scottish footballer

Personal information
- Full name: George Irvine Hunter
- Date of birth: 28 August 1930
- Place of birth: Troon, Scotland
- Date of death: 5 October 1990 (aged 60)
- Place of death: Nottingham, England
- Position: Goalkeeper

Youth career
- 1947–1949: Neilston Juniors

Senior career*
Years	Team	Apps	(Gls)
1949–1954	Celtic	31	(0)
1954–1955	Derby County	19	(0)
1955–1960	Exeter City	147	(0)
1960–1961	Yiewsley		
1961–1962	Darlington	20	(0)
1962–1963	Weymouth		
1963–1965	Burton Albion		
1965–1966	Lincoln City	1	(0)
1966–1967	Matlock Town		
- * Club domestic league appearances and goals

George Irvine Hunter (29 August 1930 – 5 October 1990) was a Scottish footballer, who played as a goalkeeper for Neilston, Celtic, Derby County, Exeter City, Yiewsley, Darlington, Weymouth, Burton Albion, Lincoln City and Matlock Town. Hunter was part of the Celtic team that won the 1951 Scottish Cup Final.
