= Rodney Slack =

English footballer

Personal information
- Full name: Rodney Slack
- Date of birth: 11 April 1940 (age 86)
- Place of birth: Farcet, Cambridgeshire
- Position: Goalkeeper

Senior career*
| Years | Team | Apps | (Gls) |
| 1958–1960 | Leicester City | | |
| 1960–1962 | Queens Park Rangers | 1 | |
| 1962–1970 | Cambridge United | | |
| 1962 | → Corby Town (loan) | | |
| 1963 | → Brentwood Town (loan) | | |
| 1970–1973 | Bury Town F.C. | | |
- * Club domestic league appearances and goals

Rodney Slack (born 1940) is an English former professional footballer who played as a goalkeeper for Leicester City, Qpr and Cambridge United. He made 1 appearance in a league cup tie for Leicester City versus Mansfield Town in October 1960 and later he made his league debut for Queens Park Rangers in a 5-3 home win versus Southend in October 1961. From 1962 to 1970 he had 353 Southern League and cup appearances for Cambridge United,
