= Gordon Wills =

English footballer (1934–2018)

Personal information
- Full name: Gordon Francis Wills
- Date of birth: 24 April 1934
- Place of birth: Wednesbury, England
- Date of death: 10 January 2018 (aged 83)
- Position: Left winger

Senior career*
| Years | Team | Apps | (Gls) |
| 1951–1953 | Wolves | 1 | (0) |
| 1953–1958 | Notts County | 170 | (47) |
| 1958–1962 | Leicester City | 128 | (33) |
| 1962–1965 | Walsall | 1 | (1) |
| Total | | 300 | (81) |
- * Club domestic league appearances and goals

Gordon Wills (24 April 1934 – 10 January 2018) was a professional footballer who played as a left winger for Wolves, Notts County, Leicester City and Walsall. He played in the Cup Winners Cup for Leicester City.

== Career statistics ==
Appearances and goals by club, season and competition
| Club | Season | League | | | FA Cup | | League Cup | | Europe | | Total | |
| Club | Season | Division | Apps | Goals | Apps | Goals | Apps | Goals | Apps | Goals | Apps | Goals |
|---|---|---|---|---|---|---|---|---|---|---|---|---|
| Wolves | 1951–52 | First Division | 0 | 0 | 0 | 0 | – | | – | | 0 | 0 |
| Wolves | 1952–53 | First Division | 1 | 0 | 0 | 0 | – | | – | | 1 | 0 |
| Wolves | Total | | 1 | 0 | 0 | 0 | – | | – | | 1 | 0 |
| Notts County | 1953–54 | Second Division | 19 | 3 | 0 | 0 | – | | – | | 19 | 3 |
| Notts County | 1954–55 | Second Division | 36 | 10 | 0 | 0 | – | | – | | 36 | 10 |
| Notts County | 1955–56 | Second Division | 32 | 5 | 0 | 0 | – | | – | | 32 | 5 |
| Notts County | 1956–57 | Second Division | 41 | 19 | 0 | 0 | – | | – | | 41 | 19 |
| Notts County | 1957–58 | Second Division | 42 | 10 | 0 | 0 | – | | – | | 42 | 10 |
| Notts County | Total | | 170 | 47 | 0 | 0 | – | | – | | 170 | 47 |
| Leicester City | 1958–59 | First Division | 22 | 2 | 0 | 0 | – | | – | | 22 | 2 |
| Leicester City | 1959–60 | First Division | 39 | 11 | 4 | 1 | – | | – | | 43 | 12 |
| Leicester City | 1960–61 | First Division | 28 | 10 | 5 | 1 | 2 | 0 | – | | 35 | 11 |
| Leicester City | 1961–62 | First Division | 22 | 7 | 1 | 0 | 1 | 0 | 4 | 1 | 28 | 8 |
| Leicester City | Total | | 111 | 30 | 10 | 2 | 3 | 0 | 4 | 1 | 128 | 33 |
| Career total | | | 282 | 77 | 10 | 2 | 3 | 0 | 4 | 0 | 299 | 80 |
