= Colin Appleton =

English footballer (1936–2021)

Personal information
- Full name: Colin Harry Appleton
- Date of birth: 7 March 1936
- Place of birth: Scarborough, North Riding of Yorkshire, England
- Date of death: 31 May 2021 (aged 85)
- Height: 5 ft 9 in (1.75 m)
- Positions: Wing half; centre half

Youth career
- 1951–1953: Scarborough

Senior career*
Years	Team	Apps	(Gls)
1953–1954	Scarborough		
1954–1966	Leicester City	277	(19)
1966–1967	Charlton Athletic	28	(1)
1967–1969	Barrow	43	(1)
1969–1973	Scarborough		
Total		348	(21)

Managerial career
- 1967–1969: Barrow
- 1969–1973: Scarborough
- 1975–1981: Scarborough
- 1982–1984: Hull City
- 1984: Swansea City
- 1985–1987: Exeter City
- 1987–1989: Bridlington Town
- 1989: Hull City
- * Club domestic league appearances and goals

Colin Harry Appleton (7 March 1936 – 31 May 2021) was an English footballer and manager. He was captain of the celebrated Leicester side nicknamed the "ice kings" which chased the double in 1962–63 and he also captained the club to their first ever major honour, winning the 1964 League Cup.

He later played for Charlton Athletic and Barrow, before playing for and managing Scarborough. He went on to manage Hull City, Swansea City, Exeter City and Bridlington Town.

== Career ==
=== Playing career ===
==== Leicester City ====
Appleton began his career as a youngster with his hometown club of Scarborough before joining Leicester City in March 1954, just days after his 18th birthday, after being recommended to manager Norman Bullock by then Scarborough manager and former Leicester player Reg Halton. He made his first team debut just six months later against Manchester City, though he made just five senior appearances over the next two years as he tried to balance his football schedule with his national service.

However, in the 1956–57 season he began to see more first team action, helping Leicester on their to the Second Division title. However, it was not until the appointment of Matt Gillies in November 1958 until Appleton's career at Leicester really began to blossom. Under Gillies, Appleton made the number 6 shirt his own and forged a fearsome half-back line partnership with Frank McLintock and Ian King.

He helped Leicester reach the 1961 FA Cup Final against Tottenham Hotspur, managed by fellow 'Scarborian' Bill Nicholson. The Spurs side also contained Malton-born Terry Dyson. Gillies made him club captain soon after, which saw him captain one of the most celebrated sides in the club's history as Leicester chased the double in 1962–63. Though it would eventually amount to nothing as Leicester eventually collapsed at the end of the league season and ended up finishing in a disappointing 4th position, the club then lost 3–1 to Manchester United in the FA Cup final.

However Appleton did captain Leicester to their first ever major trophy, winning the 1964 League Cup and also scored in the first leg of the 1965 League Cup final, as they reached the competition's final for the second consecutive season, however he could not prevent his team losing to Chelsea, going down 3–2 on aggregate.

He was awarded a testimonial at Leicester in 1964 in recognition of his services to the club and moved on to Charlton Athletic two years later after 12 years with the club.

==== Post-Leicester City ====
A season long spell at Charlton, which included a brief reunion with Ian King, was followed by a two-year spell as player-manager of Barrow, before rejoining his hometown team of Scarborough in 1969 as player/manager.

== Managerial career ==
Appleton helped guide Scarborough to victory in the FA Trophy, including scoring the winning goal in the semi-final to see the club reach the final, also being named the club's player of the season in what would turn out to be his final as a player. He was named the club's permanent manager two years later and led them to a further two FA Trophy triumphs. Making his three FA Trophy successes a record at the time.

His success in charge of Scarborough saw Hull City appoint him in 1982 and he led the club to promotion from the Fourth Division in his first season in charge. He then almost guided the club to back-to-back promotions, finishing fourth in the Third Division in his second season in charge, missing out on promotion by a single goal.

Swansea City managed to entice him away from Hull City, though Appleton won just four of his 18 games in charge of the Swans and was sacked after just six months in charge. Appleton then had a two-year spell in charge of Exeter City before a brief and unsuccessful return to Hull City before officially retiring from the game. He had failed to win the respect of his players at Hull, and the 'big characters' at the club joked around at his expense, whilst on the pitch the club slid to bottom of the Second Division.

== Death ==
Appleton died on 31 May 2021, aged 85.

== Honours ==
=== As a player ===
Leicester City

- Football League Second Division: 1956–57
- Football League Cup: 1963–64; runner-up: 1964–65
- FA Cup runner-up: 1960–61, 1962–63

=== As a manager ===
Scarborough

- FA Trophy: 1972–73, 1975–76, 1976–77

Hull City

- Football League Fourth Division second-place promotion: 1982–83
