= George Meek =

Scottish footballer

Personal information
- Full name: George Jackson Meek
- Date of birth: 15 February 1934
- Place of birth: Glasgow, Scotland
- Date of death: 16 March 2018 (aged 84)
- Place of death: Wolverhampton, England
- Height: 5 ft 3 in (1.60 m)
- Position: Winger

Youth career
- Thorniewood United

Senior career*
Years	Team	Apps	(Gls)
1951–1952	Hamilton Academical	15	(0)
1952–1960	Leeds United	195	(19)
1953–1955	→ Walsall (loan)	44	(6)
1960–1961	Leicester City	13	(0)
1961–1965	Walsall	128	(22)
- Dudley Town
Total		395	(47)
- * Club domestic league appearances and goals

George Jackson Meek (5 February 1934 – 16 March 2018) was a Scottish professional footballer who played as a winger. Active in both Scotland and England, Meek made nearly 400 league appearances in a career which lasted from 1951 to 1965, scoring nearly 50 goals.

== Career ==
Born in Glasgow, Meek began his career with Junior side Thorniewood United. After turning professional in 1951, Meek played for Hamilton Academical, Leeds United, Walsall and Leicester City, before playing non-league football with Dudley Town.

He died on 16 March 2018, aged 84.
