= Ken Keyworth =

English footballer

Personal information
- Full name: Ken Keyworth
- Date of birth: 24 February 1934
- Place of birth: Rotherham, West Riding of Yorkshire, England
- Date of death: 7 January 2000 (aged 65)
- Place of death: England
- Position: Forward

Senior career*
| Years | Team | Apps | (Gls) |
| 1955–1958 | Rotherham United | 87 | (6) |
| 1958–1964 | Leicester City | 177 | (63) |
| 1964–1965 | Coventry City | 7 | (3) |
| 1965 | Swindon Town | 6 | (0) |
| Total | | 275 | (72) |
- * Club domestic league appearances and goals

Ken Keyworth (24 February 1934 – 7 January 2000) was an English footballer in the 1950s and 1960s who played for Rotherham United, Coventry City and Swindon Town and most notably Leicester City.

He joined Leicester City from Rotherham United in 1958 for £9,000, where he became a prolific striker for the Foxes over seven seasons. He was the club's top scorer for three seasons running in 1961-62, 1962-63 and 1963-64. He played in both the 1961 and 1963 FA Cup finals, scoring Leicester's solitary goal in the latter final. He also played in both legs of Leicester's victory in the 1964 Football League Cup Final.

== Honours ==
Leicester City

- Football League Cup: 1963–64
- FA Cup runner-up: 1960–61, 1962–63
