= Frank Gardner (footballer) =

English footballer

Frank Gardner was an English footballer who was a co-founder and first secretary/manager of Leicester Fosse.
