= Howard Riley (footballer) =

English footballer (1938–2026)

Personal information
- Date of birth: 18 August 1938
- Place of birth: Wigston Magna, Leicestershire, England
- Date of death: 8 January 2026 (aged 87)
- Position: Winger

Senior career*
Years	Team	Apps	(Gls)
1955–1965	Leicester City	193	(38)
1965–1966	Walsall	24	(3)
1967	Atlanta Chiefs	5	(2)
1968–1969	Barrow	24	(6)
- * Club domestic league appearances and goals

Howard Riley (18 August 1938 – 8 January 2026) was an English footballer who played in the Football League for Leicester City, Walsall and Barrow.

He was runner up with Leicester in the 1960–61 and 1962–63 FA Cups. He scored the winning goal in the second leg of the 1964 Football League Cup final against Stoke City.

He died on 8 January 2026, at the age of 87.

== Honours ==
Leicester City

- Football League Cup: 1963–64
- FA Cup runner-up: 1960–61, 1962–63
