= Dave Gibson (Scottish footballer) =

Scottish footballer

Personal information
- Full name: David Wedderburn Gibson
- Date of birth: 23 September 1938 (age 88)
- Place of birth: Kirkliston, West Lothian, Scotland
- Position: Inside left

Senior career*
Years	Team	Apps	(Gls)
- Livingston United
1956–1962	Hibernian	41	(8)
1962–1970	Leicester City	280	(41)
1970–1972	Aston Villa	19	(1)
1972–1974	Exeter City	71	(3)
Total		411	(53)

International career
1959	SFA trial v SFL	1	(0)
1963–1964	Scotland	7	(3)
- * Club domestic league appearances and goals

David Wedderburn Gibson (born 23 September 1938) is a Scottish former footballer, who played for Livingston United, Hibernian, Leicester City, Aston Villa, Exeter City and the Scotland national team.

Considered to be one of the finest and most skilful players in Leicester's history, he was the playmaker and creative force of the great Foxes side of the 1960s under Matt Gillies, including the "Ice Kings" side that fell just short of winning the 'double' in 1962–63. He scored in both legs of Leicester's 1964 League Cup final victory and also played in a further three cup finals for the club.

Gibson earned seven caps and scored three times for Scotland, including a goal against Spain at the Santiago Bernabéu 12 months before Spain became European Champions.

== Career ==
=== Early career ===
Gibson, an inside forward, was signed by Hibernian from local junior side Livingston United in 1956. Gibson had grown up as a fan of their Edinburgh derby rivals Hearts, but was offered a better deal by Hibernian. He made his debut for Hibs alongside four of the Famous Five forward line, replacing Bobby Johnstone. After six years with the Edinburgh club he joined English club Leicester City in January 1962 for a fee reported to have been £40,000.

=== Leicester City ===
Gibson's joined Leicester while still on national service, so his appearances in 1961–62 season were restricted. He eventually made his debut on 2 March 1962. However, the following season, Gibson began to form a deadly partnership down the left-flank of Leicester's attack with Mike Stringfellow and became a key fixture in the Leicester side as they chased the double with the club sitting top of the league with 5 games to go and reaching the FA Cup Final, though they eventually fell short in both competitions. Gibson then helped Leicester to victory in the 1964 League Cup final scoring a goal in both legs of the final. He also helped Leicester to the 1965 League Cup final and the 1969 FA Cup Final, though they lost on both occasions.

=== Late career and retirement ===
Gibson moved to Aston Villa in September 1970 where he remained for two years before ending his career with Exeter City. He retired in 1974.

Gibson later became a postman before running a residential care centre in Whetstone in Leicestershire.

== International career ==
Gibson made his debut for Scotland in a 4–1 victory over Austria in front of 94,500 fans at Hampden Park on 4 May 1963 in a game that was abandoned after 79 minutes after the Austrian team's foul tactics caused referee Jim Finney to abandon the game in fear of player safety. Gibson played well enough to retain his place, in the absence of Spurs player John White, for end of season friendly matches against Norway, Republic of Ireland and Spain. His first international goal came in a famous 6–2 victory against Spain in the Bernabéu Stadium, Madrid.

He earned 7 caps overall, scoring 3 times.

=== International goals ===
Scores and results list Scotland's goal tally first.

#	Date	Venue	Opponent	Score	Result	Competition
1	13 June 1963	Santiago Bernabéu, Madrid	Spain	2–1	2–6	Friendly
2	3 October 1964	Ninian Park, Cardiff	Wales	2–1	2–3	1965 British Home Championship
3	21 October 1964	Hampden Park, Glasgow	Finland	3–0	3–1	1966 World Cup qualification

== Honours ==
Leicester City

- Football League Cup: 1963–64; runner-up: 1964–65
- FA Cup runner-up: 1962–63, 1968–69

Aston Villa

- Football League Cup runner-up: 1970–71
