= Ian King (footballer) =

Scottish footballer

Personal information
- Full name: Ian King
- Date of birth: 27 May 1937
- Place of birth: Loanhead, Midlothian, Scotland
- Date of death: 24 July 2016 (aged 79)
- Position: Defender

Youth career
- 1955–1957: Arniston Rangers

Senior career*
Years	Team	Apps	(Gls)
1957–1965	Leicester City	244	(6)
1965–1968	Charlton Athletic	63	(0)
1968–1970	Burton Albion		
Total		307	(6)
- * Club domestic league appearances and goals

Ian King (27 May 1937 — 24 July 2016) was a Scottish footballer. He spent the majority of his career at Leicester City, making up one third of the legendary half-back line with Colin Appleton and Frank McLintock. He made appearances in 244 Leicester City games, including 27 appearances in the FA Cup, and 22 appearances in the League Cup, and 4 in the Cup Winners Cup.

He made his first appearance for Leicester City on 11 September 1957, away against Sheffield Wednesday. King played as a defender, scoring a total of seven goals (including 1 goal in the Football League Cup).

King died on 24 July 2016.

== Honours ==
Leicester City

- Football League Cup: 1963–64; runner-up: 1964–65
- FA Cup runner-up: 1960–61, 1962–63
