= Jimmy Walsh (footballer, born 1930) =

Scottish footballer

Personal information
- Full name: James Walsh
- Date of birth: 3 December 1930
- Place of birth: Glasgow, Scotland
- Date of death: 6 August 2014 (aged 83)
- Place of death: Leicester, England
- Position: Forward

Senior career*
Years	Team	Apps	(Gls)
1950–1956	Celtic	144	(59)
1956–1964	Leicester City	176	(80)
1964–1968	Rugby Town		

International career
1955	Scotland U23	1	(0)
- * Club domestic league appearances and goals

James Walsh (3 December 1930 – 6 August 2014) was a professional footballer who played for Celtic and Leicester City as a forward. He was a prolific goalscorer and scored the winning goals in both the finals of the 1951 Saint Mungo Cup and the 1953 Coronation Cup, as well as playing in the 1955 Scottish Cup Final for Celtic. He then moved to Leicester City in 1956, where he was twice the club's top scorer in 1958-59 and 1960–61. He also played as Leicester lost the 1961 FA Cup Final. He still remains as one of Leicester's top 10 all-time top goalscorers.

Walsh died on 6 August 2014 at the age of 83.

== Honours ==
Celtic

- Scottish League: 1953–54
- Scottish League Cup: 1956–57
- Coronation Cup: 1953
- Saint Mungo Cup: 1951
- Scottish Cup runner-up: 1954–55

Leicester City

- FA Cup runner-up: 1960–61
