= Richie Norman =

English footballer

Personal information
- Date of birth: 5 September 1935 (age 91)
- Place of birth: Newcastle upon Tyne, Northumberland, England
- Position: Defender

Senior career*
| Years | Team | Apps | (Gls) |
- Horden Colliery Welfare
| 1958–1968 | Leicester City | 365 | (5) |
| 1968–1969 | Peterborough United | 10 | (0) |
| 1970 – 1973 | Burton Albion | | |
| Total | | 375 | (5) |

Managerial career
- 1970 – 1973: Burton Albion
- * Club domestic league appearances and goals

Richie Norman (born 5 September 1935 in Newcastle upon Tyne, Northumberland) is an English former footballer.

He started his career at Horden Colliery Welfare, before joining Leicester City where he played for nearly 10 years. A brief spell at Peterborough United followed, before leaving the Football League to join Burton Albion.

During the late 1970s he worked under Dave Mckay at Derby County.

== Honours ==
Leicester City

- FA Cup runner-up: 1960–61, 1962–63
- Football League Cup runner-up: 1964–65
