= 1963–64 Football League Cup =

1963–64 League Cup
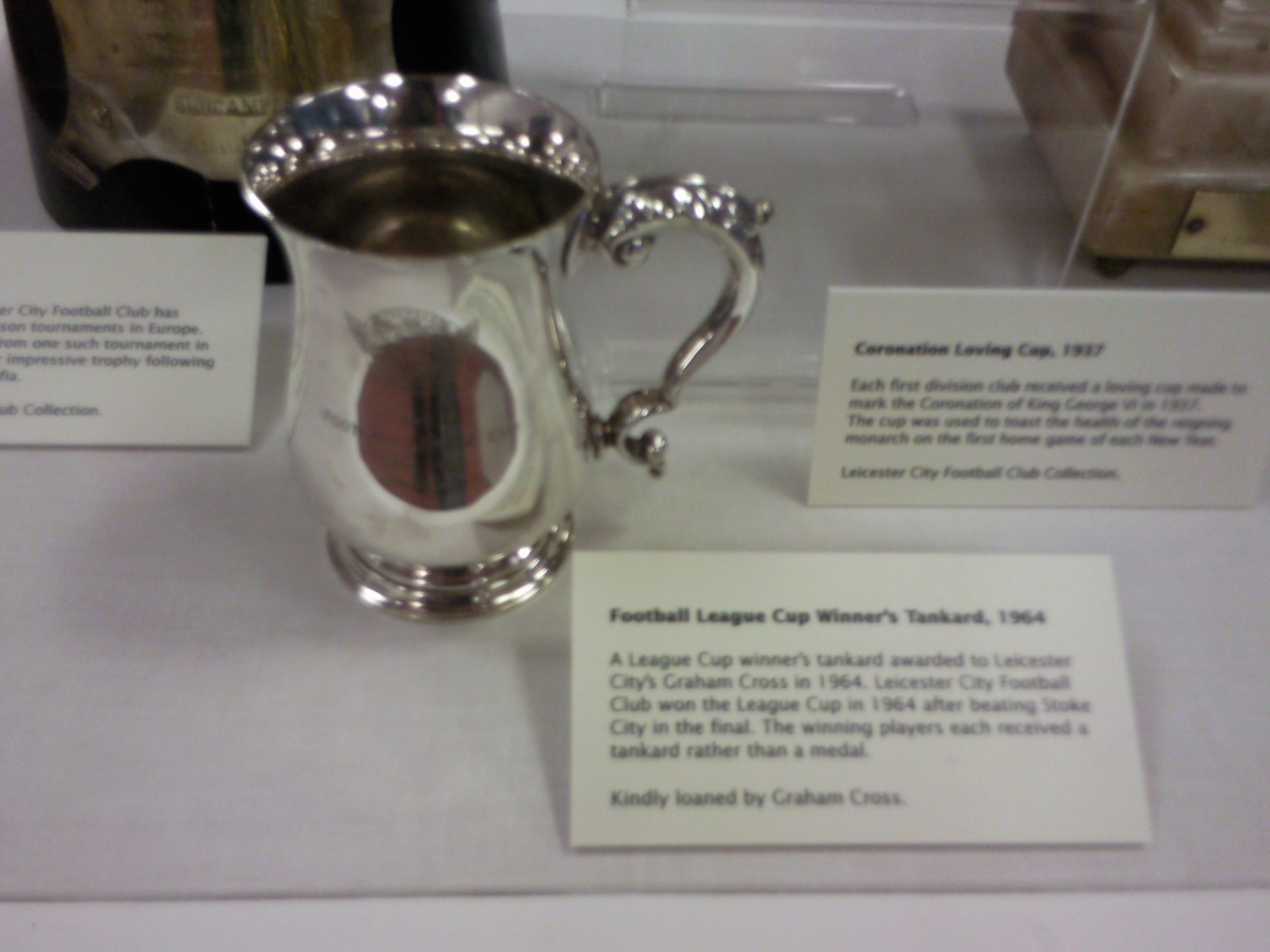
- Winners' tankard awarded to Graham Cross for the 1963–64 tournament

Tournament details
- Country: England; Wales
- Dates: 4 September 1963 – 22 April 1964
- Teams: 82

Final positions
- Champions: Leicester City
- Runners-up: Stoke City

Tournament statistics
- Matches played: 104
- Goals scored: 383 (3.68 per match)
- Top goal scorer(s): Geoff Hurst; Johnny Byrne (5 goals)

The 1963–64 Football League Cup was the fourth season of the Football League Cup, a knockout competition for England's top 92 football clubs; only 82 of them took part. (Note: Arsenal, Burnley, Everton, Liverpool, Manchester United, Nottingham Forest, Sheffield Wednesday, Tottenham Hotspur, West Bromwich Albion and Wolverhampton Wanderers were the 10 League clubs that did not compete.) The competition began on 4 September 1963 and ended with the two-legged final on 15 and 22 April 1964.

Match dates and results were initially drawn from Soccerbase, and they were later checked against Rothmans Football Yearbook 1970–71.

== Calendar ==
Of the 82 teams, 46 received a bye to the second round and the other 36 played in the first round; these were the teams ranked 57th–92nd in the 1962–63 Football League. The Semi-finals and final were two-legged.

Round	Main date	Fixtures		Clubs	New entries this round
Round	Main date	Original	Replays	Clubs	New entries this round
First Round	4 September 1963	18	5	82 → 64	36 (teams ranked 13th–24th in Third Division; all Fourth Division)
Second Round	25 September 1963	32	11	64 → 32	46 (all First and Second Division, except those teams that did not enter; teams ranked 1st–12th in Third Division)
Third Round	4 November 1963	16	2	32 → 16	none
Fourth Round	27 November 1963	8	1	16 → 8	none
Fifth Round	16 December 1963	4	1	8 → 4	none
Semi-finals	January–March 1964	4	0	4 → 2	none
Final	15 & 22 April 1964	2	0	2 → 1	none

== First round ==
=== Ties ===
Home team	Score	Away team	Date
Aldershot	3–1	Queens Park Rangers	4 September 1963
Bradford Park Avenue	7–3	Bradford City	4 September 1963
Carlisle United	3–2	Crewe Alexandra	4 September 1963
Chesterfield	0–1	Halifax Town	4 September 1963
Darlington	2–2	Barnsley	4 September 1963
Doncaster Rovers	0–0	York City	4 September 1963
Gillingham	4–2	Bristol City	4 September 1963
Lincoln City	3–2	Hartlepools United	4 September 1963
Mansfield Town	2–1	Watford	4 September 1963
Newport County	3–4	Millwall	4 September 1963
Oldham Athletic	3–5	Workington	4 September 1963
Oxford United	0–1	Exeter City	4 September 1963
Reading	1–1	Brentford	4 September 1963
Rochdale	1–1	Chester	4 September 1963
Shrewsbury Town	1–1	Bristol Rovers	4 September 1963
Southport	2–1	Barrow	4 September 1963
Torquay United	1–2	Brighton & Hove Albion	4 September 1963
Tranmere Rovers	2–0	Stockport County	4 September 1963

=== Replays ===
Home team	Score	Away team	Date
Barnsley	6–2	Darlington	11 September 1963
Brentford	2–0	Reading	23 September 1963
Bristol Rovers	6–2	Shrewsbury Town	23 September 1963
Chester	2–5	Rochdale	18 September 1963
York City	3–0	Doncaster Rovers	23 September 1963

== Second round ==
=== Ties ===
Home team	Score	Away team	Date
Aston Villa	3–1	Barnsley	25 September 1963
Blackpool	7–1	Charlton Athletic	25 September 1963
Bradford Park Avenue	2–2	Middlesbrough	25 September 1963
Brentford	0–0	Bournemouth & Boscombe Athletic	25 September 1963
Brighton & Hove Albion	1–1	Northampton Town	25 September 1963
Bristol Rovers	2–0	Crystal Palace	25 September 1963
Cardiff City	2–2	Wrexham	25 September 1963
Colchester United	5–3	Fulham	25 September 1963
Gillingham	3–0	Bury	25 September 1963
Grimsby Town	1–3	Rotherham United	25 September 1963
Halifax Town	4–2	Rochdale	25 September 1963
Hull City	1–0	Exeter City	25 September 1963
Ipswich Town	0–0	Walsall	25 September 1963
Leeds United	5–1	Mansfield Town	25 September 1963
Leicester City	2–0	Aldershot	25 September 1963
Luton Town	3–4	Coventry City	25 September 1963
Manchester City	2–0	Carlisle United	25 September 1963
Millwall	3–2	Peterborough United	25 September 1963
Newcastle United	3–0	Preston North End	25 September 1963
Norwich City	2–0	Birmingham City	25 September 1963
Notts County	2–1	Blackburn Rovers	25 September 1963
Plymouth Argyle	2–2	Huddersfield Town	25 September 1963
Portsmouth	3–2	Derby County	25 September 1963
Scunthorpe United	2–2	Stoke City	25 September 1963
Sheffield United	1–2	Bolton Wanderers	25 September 1963
Southend United	2–1	Port Vale	25 September 1963
Swansea Town	3–1	Sunderland	25 September 1963
Swindon Town	3–0	Chelsea	25 September 1963
Tranmere Rovers	2–0	Southampton	25 September 1963
West Ham United	2–1	Leyton Orient	25 September 1963
Workington	3–0	Southport	25 September 1963
York City	1–1	Lincoln City	25 September 1963

=== Replays ===
Home team	Score	Away team	Date
Bournemouth & Boscombe Athletic	2–0	Brentford	4 November 1963
Huddersfield Town	3–3	Plymouth Argyle	21 October 1963
Lincoln City	2–0	York City	14 October 1963
Middlesbrough	2–3	Bradford Park Avenue	2 October 1963
Northampton Town	3–2	Brighton & Hove Albion	14 October 1963
Stoke City	3–3	Scunthorpe United	16 October 1963
Walsall	1–0	Ipswich Town	3 October 1963
Wrexham	1–1	Cardiff City	7 October 1963

=== 2nd Replays ===
Home team	Score	Away team	Date
Plymouth Argyle	1–2	Huddersfield Town	28 October 1963
Stoke City	1–0	Scunthorpe United	22 October 1963
Wrexham	3–0	Cardiff City	21 October 1963

== Third round ==
=== Ties ===
Home team	Score	Away team	Date
Aston Villa	0–2	West Ham United	16 October 1963
Bournemouth & Boscombe Athletic	2–1	Newcastle United	6 November 1963
Bristol Rovers	1–1	Gillingham	4 November 1963
Colchester United	4–1	Northampton Town	4 November 1963
Halifax Town	2–0	Walsall	16 October 1963
Hull City	0–3	Manchester City	16 October 1963
Leeds United	2–0	Swansea Town	22 October 1963
Millwall	1–1	Lincoln City	4 November 1963
Norwich City	1–0	Blackpool	30 October 1963
Notts County	3–2	Bradford Park Avenue	5 November 1963
Rotherham United	4–2	Coventry City	4 November 1963
Stoke City	3–0	Bolton Wanderers	29 October 1963
Swindon Town	3–0	Southend United	16 October 1963
Tranmere Rovers	1–2	Leicester City	16 October 1963
Workington	1–0	Huddersfield Town	4 November 1963
Wrexham	3–5	Portsmouth	4 November 1963

=== Replays ===
Home team	Score	Away team	Date
Gillingham	3–1	Bristol Rovers	6 November 1963
Lincoln City	1–2	Millwall	12 November 1963

== Fourth round ==
=== Ties ===
Home team	Score	Away team	Date
Halifax Town	1–7	Norwich City	27 November 1963
Leicester City	3–1	Gillingham	27 November 1963
Manchester City	3–1	Leeds United	27 November 1963
Notts County	3–2	Portsmouth	13 November 1963
Rotherham United	5–2	Millwall	27 November 1963
Stoke City	2–1	Bournemouth & Boscombe Athletic	27 November 1963
Swindon Town	3–3	West Ham United	19 November 1963
Workington	2–1	Colchester United	26 November 1963

=== Replay ===
Home team	Score	Away team	Date
West Ham United	4–1	Swindon Town	25 November 1963

== Fifth round ==
=== Ties ===
Home team	Score	Away team	Date
Norwich City	1–1	Leicester City	18 December 1963
Notts County	0–1	Manchester City	17 December 1963
Stoke City	3–2	Rotherham United	16 December 1963
West Ham United	6–0	Workington	16 December 1963

=== Replay ===
Home team	Score	Away team	Date
Leicester City	2–1	Norwich City	15 January 1964

== Semi-finals ==
=== First leg ===
Home team	Score	Away team	Date
Stoke City	2–0	Manchester City	15 January 1964
Leicester City	4–3	West Ham United	5 February 1964

=== Second leg ===
Home team	Score	Away team	Date	Agg
Manchester City	1–0	Stoke City	5 February 1964	1–2
West Ham United	0–2	Leicester City	23 March 1964	3–6

== Final ==
15 April 1964

Stoke City	1–1	Leicester City
Bebbington		Gibson

Victoria Ground, Stoke-on-Trent
Attendance: 22,309
Referee: W. Clements
22 April 1964

Leicester City	3–2	Stoke City
Stringfellow; Gibson; Riley		Dennis Viollet; George Kinnell

Filbert Street, Leicester
Attendance: 25,372
Referee: A. Jobling

Leicester City win 4–3 on aggregate.
