= Graham Cross =

English footballer and cricketer

Personal information
- Full name: Graham Frederick Cross
- Date of birth: 15 November 1943 (age 82)
- Place of birth: Leicester, England
- Positions: Defender; midfielder

Senior career*
Years	Team	Apps	(Gls)
1960–1976	Leicester City	498	(29)
1975–1976	→ Chesterfield (loan)	12	(0)
1976–1977	Brighton & Hove Albion	46	(3)
1977–1979	Preston North End	45	(1)
1978–1979	Lincoln City	19	(0)
Total		620	(33)

International career
- England U23
- * Club domestic league appearances and goals

Graham Frederick Cross (born 15 November 1943) is a former professional footballer and cricketer. He is the record appearance holder for Leicester City, making 600 appearances for the club in all competitions (as Community Shield now considered a full appearance).

== Football career ==
Cross was born in Leicester. He spent most of his career playing for Leicester City originally as an inside forward, then later as a centre-half and occasionally a right half. At Leicester he holds the record for the most appearances for the club with 600 between 1961 and 1975. He went on to join Brighton & Hove Albion and then Preston North End. He made the record number of appearances for the England Under 23 side but never made a full international appearance.

== Cricket career ==
Cross also represented Leicestershire as a right-handed batsman and a right-arm medium-fast bowler between 1961 and 1977. In 83 first-class matches, he scored 2,079 runs (average 18.39), highest score 78 with eight fifties and 61 catches. He took 92 wickets (average 29.95), best bowling 4/28. In 51 List A matches, he scored 701 runs (average 20.61), highest score 57 not out with three fifties and 17 catches. He took 63 wickets (average 20.23), best bowling 4/11.

Appearing irregularly because of his football commitments, Cross was nevertheless a good enough player to find a place in Ray Illingworth's successful county side of the mid '70s. He was a member of the Leicestershire team that won the Benson & Hedges Cup in 1975. Cross's last appearance came when the side was stricken by illness in May 1977. A scratch side had to be assembled to play Hampshire at Grace Road in the B&H Cup. Showing his characteristic adaptability, he kept wicket for the only time during his career.

== Honours ==
=== As a player ===
Leicester City

- Football League Second Division: 1970–71
- Football League Cup: 1963–64; runner-up: 1964–65
- FA Charity Shield: 1971
- FA Cup runner-up: 1962–63, 1968–69

Leicestershire County Cricket Club

- Benson and Hedges Cup: 1975

Records

- Leicester City all-time leading appearance maker: 600 games
- Leicester City all-time leading appearance maker in the first tier (Premier League and predecessors): 414 games
- Leicester City all-time leading appearance maker in the FA Cup: 59 games
- Leicester City all-time leading appearance maker in the League Cup: 40 games (Joint record)
