= 1960–61 FA Cup =

Tournament details
- Country: England; Wales

Final positions
- Champions: Tottenham Hotspur (3rd title)
- Runners-up: Leicester City

The 1960–61 FA Cup was the 80th season of the world's oldest football cup competition, the Football Association Challenge Cup, commonly known as the FA Cup. Tottenham Hotspur won the competition for the third time, beating Leicester City 2–0 in the final at Wembley. In doing so, they became the first team to win the Double since Aston Villa in 1897.

Matches were scheduled to be played at the stadium of the team named first on the date specified for each round, which was always a Saturday. Some matches, however, might be rescheduled for other days if there were clashes with games for other competitions or the weather was inclement. If scores were level after 90 minutes had been played, a replay would take place at the stadium of the second-named team later the same week. If the replayed match was drawn further replays would be held until a winner was determined. If scores were level after 90 minutes had been played in a replay, a 30-minute period of extra time would be played.

== Calendar ==
Round	Date
Preliminary round	Saturday 27 August 1960
First round qualifying	Saturday 10 September 1960
Second round qualifying	Saturday 24 September 1960
Third round qualifying	Saturday 8 October 1960
Fourth round qualifying	Saturday 22 October 1960
First round proper	Saturday 5 November 1960
Second round proper	Saturday 26 November 1960
Third round proper	Saturday 7 January 1961
Fourth round proper	Saturday 28 January 1961
Fifth round proper	Saturday 18 February 1961
Sixth round proper	Saturday 4 March 1961
Semi-finals	Saturday 18 March 1961
Final	Saturday 6 May 1961

== Qualifying rounds ==
Most participating clubs that were not members of the Football League competed in the qualifying rounds to secure one of 30 places available in the first round.

The winners from the fourth qualifying round were Blyth Spartans, Scarborough, Bishop Auckland, Macclesfield Town, Rhyl, Bangor City, Hereford United, Worcester City, Bridlington Town, Sutton Town, Loughborough United, Kettering Town, Clacton Town, King's Lynn, Chelmsford City, Hitchin Town, Romford, Walthamstow Avenue, Dover, Ashford Town (Kent), Hastings United, Oxford United, Maidenhead United, Wycombe Wanderers, Sutton United, Chichester City, Weymouth, Bridgwater Town, Yeovil Town and Bath City.

Those appearing in the competition proper for the first time were Bridlington Town, Loughborough United, Clacton Town, Dover, Chichester City and Bridgwater Town. Of the others, Romford had last featured at this stage in 1949–50, Sutton United in 1946-47, Sutton Town in 1933-34, and Macclesfield Town and Maidenhead United in 1887-88.

Romford was the only non-league side to feature in six rounds of this season's tournament, defeating Wembley, Leytonstone, Hornchurch & Upminster, Enfield and Sutton United before going out to Northampton Town in the second round.

== Results ==
=== First round proper ===
At this stage the 48 clubs from the Football League Third and Fourth Divisions joined the 30 non-league clubs who came through the qualifying rounds. To set the number of ties in this round at the requisite 40, Gateshead, who had recently been voted out of the Football League, and Hendon, who were the champions from the previous season's FA Amateur Cup, were given byes directly to this point. Matches were scheduled to be played on Saturday, 5 November 1960. Eleven were drawn and went to replays.

The Crystal Palace-Hitchin Town match was of curious interest as a replay of one of the first-round fixtures from the inaugural tournament of 1871–72. It was the first such match in the competition proper since Clapham Rovers and Upton Park had met in the fourth round of the 1880-81 tournament (although Maidenhead United and Marlow had subsequently been drawn together eight times in the qualifying rounds).

Tie no	Home team	Score	Away team	Date
1	Ashford Town (Kent)	1–2	Gillingham	5 November 1960
2	Chester	0–1	Carlisle United	5 November 1960
3	Chesterfield	3–3	Doncaster Rovers	5 November 1960
Replay	Doncaster Rovers	0–1	Chesterfield	9 November 1960
4	Darlington	2–0	Grimsby Town	5 November 1960
5	Bristol City	11–0	Chichester City	5 November 1960
6	Sutton United	2–2	Romford	5 November 1960
Replay	Romford	5–0	Sutton United	9 November 1960
7	Watford	2–2	Brentford	5 November 1960
Replay	Brentford	0–2	Watford	8 November 1960
8	Weymouth	1–3	Torquay United	5 November 1960
9	Reading	6–2	Millwall	5 November 1960
10	Walsall	0–1	Yeovil Town	5 November 1960
11	Crewe Alexandra	1–1	Rochdale	5 November 1960
Replay	Rochdale	1–2	Crewe Alexandra	8 November 1960
12	Swindon Town	2–2	Bath City	5 November 1960
Replay	Bath City	4–6	Swindon Town	9 November 1960
13	Shrewsbury Town	4–1	Newport County	5 November 1960
14	Bishop Auckland	3–2	Bridlington Town	5 November 1960
15	Tranmere Rovers	1–0	Bury	5 November 1960
16	Stockport County	1–0	Workington	5 November 1960
17	Dover	1–4	Peterborough United	5 November 1960
18	Wycombe Wanderers	1–2	Kettering Town	5 November 1960
19	Queens Park Rangers	3–2	Walthamstow Avenue	5 November 1960
20	Bangor City	1–0	Wrexham	5 November 1960
21	Accrington Stanley	2–1	Barrow	5 November 1960
22	Northampton Town	2–1	Hastings United	5 November 1960
23	Rhyl	0–1	Oldham Athletic	5 November 1960
24	Bradford City	0–0	Scarborough	5 November 1960
Replay	Scarborough	1–2	Bradford City	9 November 1960
25	Hull City	3–0	Sutton Town	5 November 1960
26	Crystal Palace	6–2	Hitchin Town	5 November 1960
27	Worcester City	1–4	Coventry City	5 November 1960
28	Exeter City	1–1	Bournemouth & Boscombe Athletic	5 November 1960
Replay	Bournemouth & Boscombe Athletic	3–1	Exeter City	9 November 1960
29	Mansfield Town	3–1	Blyth Spartans	5 November 1960
30	Halifax Town	5–1	Hartlepools United	5 November 1960
31	Southport	7–2	Macclesfield Town	5 November 1960
32	Clacton Town	1–3	Southend United	5 November 1960
33	York City	0–0	Bradford Park Avenue	5 November 1960
Replay	Bradford Park Avenue	0–2	York City	9 November 1960
34	Aldershot	2–0	Notts County	5 November 1960
35	Gateshead	0–0	Barnsley	5 November 1960
Replay	Barnsley	2–0	Gateshead	9 November 1960
36	Colchester United	5–0	Maidenhead United	5 November 1960
37	Chelmsford City	2–3	Port Vale	5 November 1960
38	Hendon	2–2	Oxford United	5 November 1960
Replay	Oxford United	3–2	Hendon	9 November 1960
39	Bridgwater Town	3–0	Hereford United	5 November 1960
40	Loughborough United	0–0	King's Lynn	5 November 1960
Replay	King's Lynn	3–0	Loughborough United	9 November 1960

=== Second round proper ===
The matches were scheduled for Saturday, 26 November 1960, with three matches taking place later. Seven matches were drawn, with replays taking place later the same week. However, the Darlington–Hull City match went to another three replays after this before the match finished in Hull City's favour.

Tie no	Home team	Score	Away team	Date
1	Chesterfield	4–4	Oldham Athletic	26 November 1960
Replay	Oldham Athletic	0–3	Chesterfield	29 November 1960
2	Darlington	1–1	Hull City	26 November 1960
Replay	Hull City	1–1	Darlington	28 November 1960
Replay	Darlington	1–1	Hull City	5 December 1960
Replay	Hull City	0–0	Darlington	12 December 1960
Replay	Darlington	0–3	Hull City	15 December 1960
3	Bournemouth & Boscombe Athletic	3–1	Yeovil Town	26 November 1960
4	Reading	4–2	Kettering Town	26 November 1960
5	Gillingham	3–2	Southend United	26 November 1960
6	Swindon Town	0–1	Shrewsbury Town	26 November 1960
7	Tranmere Rovers	1–1	York City	30 November 1960
Replay	York City	2–1	Tranmere Rovers	5 December 1960
8	Stockport County	2–0	Bishop Auckland	26 November 1960
9	Queens Park Rangers	1–2	Coventry City	26 November 1960
10	Bangor City	1–1	Southport	26 November 1960
Replay	Southport	3–1	Bangor City	29 November 1960
11	Accrington Stanley	3–0	Mansfield Town	30 November 1960
12	King's Lynn	2–2	Bristol City	26 November 1960
Replay	Bristol City	3–0	King's Lynn	29 November 1960
13	Bradford City	1–2	Barnsley	26 November 1960
14	Crystal Palace	0–0	Watford	26 November 1960
Replay	Watford	1–0	Crystal Palace	29 November 1960
15	Port Vale	2–1	Carlisle United	26 November 1960
16	Halifax Town	2–2	Crewe Alexandra	29 November 1960
Replay	Crewe Alexandra	3–0	Halifax Town	5 December 1960
17	Torquay United	1–3	Peterborough United	26 November 1960
18	Aldershot	3–1	Colchester United	26 November 1960
19	Romford	1–5	Northampton Town	26 November 1960
20	Oxford United	2–1	Bridgwater Town	26 November 1960

=== Third round proper ===
The 44 First and Second Division clubs entered the competition at this stage.

The matches were scheduled for Saturday, 7 January 1961. Nine matches were drawn and went to replays, with two of these requiring a second replay. Oxford United was the last non-league club left in the competition.

Tie no	Home team	Score	Away team	Date
1	Chesterfield	0–0	Blackburn Rovers	7 January 1961
Replay	Blackburn Rovers	3–0	Chesterfield	11 January 1961
2	Burnley	1–0	Bournemouth & Boscombe Athletic	7 January 1961
3	Liverpool	3–2	Coventry City	7 January 1961
4	Preston North End	1–1	Accrington Stanley	7 January 1961
Replay	Accrington Stanley	0–4	Preston North End	9 January 1961
5	Southampton	7–1	Ipswich Town	7 January 1961
6	Reading	1–1	Barnsley	7 January 1961
Replay	Barnsley	3–1	Reading	11 January 1961
7	Gillingham	2–6	Leyton Orient	7 January 1961
8	Leicester City	3–1	Oxford United	7 January 1961
9	Nottingham Forest	0–2	Birmingham City	7 January 1961
10	Sheffield Wednesday	2–0	Leeds United	7 January 1961
11	Wolverhampton Wanderers	1–1	Huddersfield Town	7 January 1961
Replay	Huddersfield Town	2–1	Wolverhampton Wanderers	11 January 1961
12	Sunderland	2–1	Arsenal	7 January 1961
13	Lincoln City	3–1	West Bromwich Albion	7 January 1961
14	Luton Town	4–0	Northampton Town	7 January 1961
15	Everton	0–1	Sheffield United	7 January 1961
16	Stockport County	3–1	Southport	7 January 1961
17	Newcastle United	5–0	Fulham	7 January 1961
18	Tottenham Hotspur	3–2	Charlton Athletic	7 January 1961
19	Bristol Rovers	1–1	Aston Villa	7 January 1961
Replay	Aston Villa	4–0	Bristol Rovers	9 January 1961
20	Portsmouth	1–2	Peterborough United	7 January 1961
21	West Ham United	2–2	Stoke City	7 January 1961
Replay	Stoke City	1–0	West Ham United	11 January 1961
22	Brighton & Hove Albion	3–1	Derby County	7 January 1961
23	Manchester United	3–0	Middlesbrough	7 January 1961
24	Plymouth Argyle	0–1	Bristol City	7 January 1961
25	Hull City	0–1	Bolton Wanderers	7 January 1961
26	Chelsea	1–2	Crewe Alexandra	7 January 1961
27	Scunthorpe United	6–2	Blackpool	7 January 1961
28	Cardiff City	1–1	Manchester City	7 January 1961
Replay	Manchester City	0–0	Cardiff City	11 January 1961
Replay	Cardiff City	0–2	Manchester City	16 January 1961
29	Swansea Town	3–0	Port Vale	7 January 1961
30	York City	1–1	Norwich City	7 January 1961
Replay	Norwich City	1–0	York City	11 January 1961
31	Rotherham United	1–0	Watford	7 January 1961
32	Aldershot	1–1	Shrewsbury Town	7 January 1961
Replay	Shrewsbury Town	2–2	Aldershot	11 January 1961
Replay	Aldershot	2–0	Shrewsbury Town	16 January 1961

=== Fourth round proper ===
The matches were scheduled for Saturday, 28 January 1961, with three games postponed until 1 February. Six matches were drawn and went to replays, which were all played in the following midweek match, and one of these was then replayed a second time. Tottenham Hotspur and Crewe Alexandra were drawn together for the second consecutive season in the fourth round, with Tottenham having beaten Crewe 13–2 in a replay the one year earlier.

The fourth round match between second division Luton Town and first division Manchester City at Kenilworth Road was originally played on Saturday 28 January 1961. It saw Luton Town take a 2–0 lead before Denis Law scored 6 goals for Manchester City. The match was then abandoned at 6–2 to Manchester City due to a waterlogged pitch. When the match was held again 4 days later on Wednesday 1 February 1961, Luton Town beat Manchester City 3–1.

Tie no	Home team	Score	Away team	Date
1	Liverpool	0–2	Sunderland	28 January 1961
2	Southampton	0–1	Leyton Orient	28 January 1961
3	Leicester City	5–1	Bristol City	31 January 1961
4	Sheffield Wednesday	1–1	Manchester United	28 January 1961
Replay	Manchester United	2–7	Sheffield Wednesday	1 February 1961
5	Bolton Wanderers	3–3	Blackburn Rovers	28 January 1961
Replay	Blackburn Rovers	4–0	Bolton Wanderers	1 February 1961
6	Luton Town	3–1	Manchester City	1 February 1961
7	Sheffield United	3–1	Lincoln City	28 January 1961
8	Newcastle United	4–0	Stockport County	1 February 1961
9	Tottenham Hotspur	5–1	Crewe Alexandra	28 January 1961
10	Brighton & Hove Albion	3–3	Burnley	28 January 1961
Replay	Burnley	2–0	Brighton & Hove Albion	31 January 1961
11	Scunthorpe United	1–4	Norwich City	28 January 1961
12	Huddersfield Town	1–1	Barnsley	1 February 1961
Replay	Barnsley	1–0	Huddersfield Town	6 February 1961
13	Swansea Town	2–1	Preston North End	28 January 1961
14	Stoke City	0–0	Aldershot	28 January 1961
Replay	Aldershot	0–0	Stoke City	1 February 1961
Replay	Stoke City	3–0	Aldershot	6 February 1961
15	Peterborough United	1–1	Aston Villa	28 January 1961
Replay	Aston Villa	2–1	Peterborough United	1 February 1961
16	Birmingham City	4–0	Rotherham United	28 January 1961

=== Fifth round proper ===
The matches were scheduled for Saturday, 18 February 1961. One match went to a replay in the following mid-week fixture.

Tie no	Home team	Score	Away team	Date
1	Burnley	4–0	Swansea Town	18 February 1961
2	Aston Villa	0–2	Tottenham Hotspur	18 February 1961
3	Sheffield United	2–1	Blackburn Rovers	18 February 1961
4	Newcastle United	3–1	Stoke City	18 February 1961
5	Barnsley	1–0	Luton Town	18 February 1961
6	Norwich City	0–1	Sunderland	18 February 1961
7	Birmingham City	1–1	Leicester City	18 February 1961
Replay	Leicester City	2–1	Birmingham City	22 February 1961
8	Leyton Orient	0–2	Sheffield Wednesday	18 February 1961

=== Sixth round proper ===
The four sixth round ties were scheduled to be played on Saturday, 4 March 1961. Three of the four matches went to replays in the midweek fixtures before being settled.

Tie no	Home team	Score	Away team	Date
1	Leicester City	0–0	Barnsley	4 March 1961
Replay	Barnsley	1–2	Leicester City	8 March 1961
2	Sheffield Wednesday	0–0	Burnley	4 March 1961
Replay	Burnley	2–0	Sheffield Wednesday	7 March 1961
3	Sunderland	1–1	Tottenham Hotspur	4 March 1961
Replay	Tottenham Hotspur	5–0	Sunderland	8 March 1961
4	Newcastle United	1–3	Sheffield United	4 March 1961

=== Semi-finals ===
The semi-final matches were played on Saturday, 18 March 1961 with the Leicester City–Sheffield United game requiring two replays. This series of games marked the first time since 1928 that a semi-final had required a second replay, and the first time ever in the FA Cup that a semi-final had failed to produce a goal after a replay. United had the ball in the net through Derek Pace in the first game and although the player insisted that it hit his shoulder, the referee disallowed for handball. Leicester eventually won the tie and so went on to meet Tottenham in the final at Wembley.

18 March 1961
15:00

Leicester City	0–0	Sheffield United
	Report

Elland Road, Leeds
Attendance: 52,095
Referee: Jim Finney, Hereford

Replay

23 March 1961
19:45

Sheffield United	0–0 (a.e.t)	Leicester City
	Report

City Ground, Nottingham
Referee: Jim Finney, Hereford

Second Replay

27 March 1961
19:15

Leicester City	2–0	Sheffield United
Walsh 47'; Leek 58'	Report

St. Andrew's, Birmingham
Referee: Jim Finney, Hereford

18 March 1961
15:00

Tottenham Hotspur	3–0	Burnley
Smith 25' 50'; Jones 89'	Report

Villa Park, Birmingham
Attendance: 69,968
Referee: K. A. Collinge, Altrincham

=== Final ===
The 1961 FA Cup Final took place on 6 May 1961 at Wembley Stadium and was won by Tottenham Hotspur who defeated Leicester City, by a 2–0 scoreline. In doing so, Tottenham became the first team to complete the League and FA Cup Double since Aston Villa in 1897.

6 May 1961

Tottenham Hotspur	2–0	Leicester City
Smith 66'; Dyson 75'

Wembley, London
Attendance: 100,000
Referee: J. Kelly

Tottenham Hotspur	Leicester City
