= George Jackson =

George Jackson may refer to:

== People ==
=== Politics ===
- George Jackson (Australian politician) (1856–1938), member of the Queensland Legislative Assembly
- George Jackson (Canadian politician) (1808–1885), Canadian mill operator, MP from Ontario
- George Jackson (Irish politician) (1761–1805), Member of Parliament for Mayo 1801–1802
- Sir George Duckett, 1st Baronet (1725–1822), born George Jackson, British politician and MP
- George Jackson (Virginia politician) (1757–1831), U.S. Representative from Virginia
- Sir George Jackson, 1st Baronet, of Fort Hill (1770–1846), Anglo-Irish Member of Parliament
- George H. Jackson (politician) (1847–1925), Ohio state representative
- George W. Jackson (politician) (1924–2023), Pennsylvania politician
- George Jackson (activist) (1941–1971), American Black Panther, prisoner, and author
- George Jackson (Ontario politician) (1921–1995), MPP for London South 1955–1959
- George Jackson (Peruvian politician)(1983-), Politician and APRA Party Primary Candidate in 2026.

=== Sports ===
- George Jackson (baseball) (1882–1972), American Major League Baseball player
- George Jackson (cricketer) (fl. mid-18th century), English cricketer
- George Jackson (cyclist) (born 2000), New Zealand cyclist
- George Jackson (footballer, born 1952), English footballer
- George Jackson (footballer, born 1893) (1893–1985), English footballer
- George Jackson (footballer, born 1987), Brazilian footballer, full name George Jackson dos Santos Souza

=== Entertainment ===
- George Jackson (animator) (1920–1986), British animator
- George Jackson (music producer) (born 1969), American music producer, DJ, and remixer
- George Jackson (filmmaker) (1958–2000), American film producer
- George Jackson (songwriter) (1945–2013), American songwriter, singer and musician
- George O. Jackson Jr. (born 1941), photographer

=== Science ===
- George Jackson (botanist) (1790–1811), English botanist
- George Jackson (chemist) (born 1962), British chemist

=== Other people ===
- George Jackson (plasterwork) (1766–1840), British plasterwork innovator
- George Jackson (British Army officer) (1876–1958)
- George H. Jackson (diplomat), American lawyer, consul, and political activist
- George W. Jackson (developer) (born 1952), American real estate developer
- George Pullen Jackson (1874–1953), American educator and musicologist
- George Holbrook Jackson (1874–1948), British journalist and author

== Other uses ==
- George Jackson (Brookside), a character on UK soap opera Brookside
- "George Jackson" (song), a 1971 song by Bob Dylan

== See also ==
- George Jackson Churchward (1857–1933), GWR railway engineer
