= Kevin Lewis =

Kevin Lewis may refer to:

- Kevin C. Lewis, Jersey politician
- Kevin Lewis (cricketer) (1947–2020), Australian cricketer
- Kevin Lewis (director), American film director
- Kevin Lewis (defensive back) (born 1966), American football defensive back
- Kevin Lewis (footballer, born 1940), English footballer who played for Huddersfield Town, Liverpool and Sheffield United
- Kevin Lewis (footballer, born 1952), English footballer who played for Crewe Alexandra and Stoke City
- Kevin Lewis (footballer, born 1970), English footballer who played for Stoke City
- Kevin Lewis (footballer, born 1999), Uruguayan footballer
- Kevin Lewis (linebacker) (born 1978), American football linebacker
- Kevin Lewis (runner) (born 1993), American distance runner
