= John Moore (footballer, born 1945) =

English footballer

Personal information
- Full name: John Moore
- Date of birth: 9 September 1945
- Place of birth: Liverpool, England
- Date of death: 27 December 2024 (aged 79)
- Position: Defender

Senior career*
Years	Team	Apps	(Gls)
1966–1967	Everton	0	(0)
1967–1968	Stoke City	13	(0)
1968–1972	Shrewsbury Town	144	(1)
1972–1974	Swansea City	31	(0)
Total		188	(1)
- * Club domestic league appearances and goals

John Moore (9 September 1945 – 27 December 2024) was an English footballer who played in the Football League for Shrewsbury Town, Swansea City and Stoke City.

== Career ==
Moore was born in Liverpool and began his career with Everton's youth team before joining Stoke City in 1967. He was thrust into the first team due to injuries and played in 13 matches during the 1967–68 season. However it was a poor season for Stoke as they were almost relegated and in the 13 matches played in defence Stoke lost nine of them conceding 32 goals. He was released from his contract and signed for Third Division Shrewsbury Town. He became a regular for the "Shrews", playing 159 matches for the club and scoring once, against Rotherham United on 15 August 1970. He then spent a year and a half at Welsh club Swansea City before retiring due to injury.

== Career statistics ==
- Sourced from John Moore at the English National Football Archive (subscription required)

Appearances and goals by club, season and competition
Club	Season	League			FA Cup		League Cup		Total	
Club	Season	Division	Apps	Goals	Apps	Goals	Apps	Goals	Apps	Goals
Stoke City	1967–68	First Division	13	0	0	0	0	0	13	0
Shrewsbury Town	1968–69	Third Division	33	0	1	0	0	0	34	0
Shrewsbury Town	1969–70	Third Division	39	0	2	0	2	0	43	0
Shrewsbury Town	1970–71	Third Division	31	1	3	0	1	0	35	1
Shrewsbury Town	1971–72	Third Division	20	0	2	0	0	0	22	0
Shrewsbury Town	1972–73	Third Division	21	0	3	0	1	0	25	0
Swansea City	1972–73	Fourth Division	18	0	0	0	0	0	18	0
Swansea City	1973–74	Fourth Division	13	0	0	0	2	0	15	0
Career Total			188	1	11	0	6	0	205	1
