= 1972–73 Stoke City F.C. season =

Stoke City
1972–73 season
- Chairman: Albert Henshall
- Manager: Tony Waddington
- Stadium: Victoria Ground
- Football League First Division: 15th (38 Points)
- FA Cup: Third Round
- League Cup: Fourth Round
- UEFA Cup: First Round
- Top goalscorer: League: Jimmy Greenhoff (16); All: Jimmy Greenhoff (20)
- Highest home attendance: 36,051 vs Manchester United (14 April 1973)
- Lowest home attendance: 17,772 vs Southampton (11 November 1972)
- Average home league attendance: 23,800
Home colours

The 1972–73 season was Stoke City's 66th season in the Football League and the 42nd in the First Division.

After the jubilation of last season's success the club was able to sign world cup winner Geoff Hurst which boosted season ticket sales. They also entered European competition for the first time losing 5–3 on aggregate to German side 1. FC Kaiserslautern. Stoke failed to build on last season and had to settle for a mid table position of 15th.

== Season review ==
=== League ===
After winning the League Cup last season there was a number of notable departures during the early part of the season. They sold Mike Bernard to Everton for a record £140,000, with the money being spent on Jimmy Robertson from Ipswich Town and World Cup winner Geoff Hurst from West Ham United. Stoke now had an abundance of attacking talent but both Harry Burrows and Peter Dobing decided to retire during the season.

The arrival of Hurst certainly boosted season ticket sales and a record takings were banked before a ball was kicked prior to the start of the 1972–73 season. It proved that the public of Stoke-on-Trent were now right behind the team but despite high hopes and expectations, the "Potters" started the new campaign rather poorly and found themselves in the bottom six. Stoke's immediate plans were hit when on the Sunday morning of 22 October 1972 after visiting the Victoria Ground for treatment Gordon Banks crashed his car on the way home and effectively ended his career. Such was the scale of Banks' presence his condition was headline news. Realising that Banks was to be out of action for quite some time Waddington moved in for Scotland international Bobby Clark, but the deal fell through as he failed to impress the Stoke directors. Mike McDonald was signed instead from Clydebank as cover for John Farmer after it was learnt that Banks had lost an eye and would never play competitive football again.

George Eastham returned to the club in February after spending time doing coaching work in South Africa, he added his experience to the cause as he helped Stoke to recover and take 15th place. Three players reached double figures in the league scoring charts this term, Jimmy Greenhoff (16), John Ritchie (14) and Geoff Hurst (10) as Stoke scored 61 goals. They ended the season with a tour of Oceania.

=== FA Cup ===
In the FA Cup Stoke went out in the third round losing 3–2 to Manchester City at Maine Road.

=== League Cup ===
As holders of the League Cup, Stoke started off with high hopes of retaining the trophy and they began with good wins over Sunderland (3–0) and Ipswich Town (2–1) but a bad night at Notts County (1–3) in the fourth round put paid to any hopes of a return to Wembley.

=== UEFA Cup ===
Their success in the 1972 Football League Cup Final, had placed them into a European competition for the first time, and they drew little known West German side 1. FC Kaiserslautern in the first round. A comfortable 3–1 home win was achieved in the first leg and two weeks later Waddington favoured a defensive team for the match at the Fritz-Walter-Stadion. The plan backed fired and Stoke were crushed 4–0 with John Ritchie being sent-off just seconds after being brought on as a substitute without even touching the ball.

== Final league table ==
Pos	Team	Pld	W	D	L	GF	GA	GAv	Pts	Qualification or relegation
13	Southampton	42	11	18	13	47	52	0.904	40	
14	Sheffield United	42	15	10	17	51	59	0.864	40	
15	Stoke City	42	14	10	18	61	56	1.089	38	Qualification for the Watney Cup (Note: West Ham United and Stoke City qualified for the Watney Cup as the two teams with the most goals that had not already qualified for a European competition.)
16	Leicester City	42	10	17	15	40	46	0.870	37	
17	Everton	42	13	11	18	41	49	0.837	37	

Source: World Football
Rules for classification: 1) Points; 2) Goal average; 3) Goals scored

== Results ==
Stoke's score comes first

=== Legend ===
Win	Draw	Loss

=== Football League First Division ===
Match	Date	Opponent	Venue	Result	Attendance	Scorers
1	12 August 1972	Crystal Palace	H	2–0	22,564	Smith 32', Ritchie 64'
2	15 August 1972	Southampton	A	0–1	18,242	
3	19 August 1972	Arsenal	A	0–2	42,164	
4	23 August 1972	Sheffield United	H	2–2	20,402	Smith 55', Hurst 68'
5	26 August 1972	Everton	H	1–1	26,360	Ritchie 12'
6	30 August 1972	Norwich City	A	0–2	30,069	
7	2 September 1972	Coventry City	A	1–2	14,317	Pejic 85'
8	9 September 1972	Leeds United	H	2–2	26,709	Hurst 59', Conroy 80'
9	16 September 1972	Ipswich Town	A	0–2	17,810	
10	23 September 1972	Manchester City	H	5–1	26,448	Conroy 6', Greenhoff (3) 13', 68', 82', Hurst 57'
11	30 September 1972	Wolverhampton Wanderers	A	3–5	24,133	Hurst 3' (pen), Greenhoff 24', Bloor 75'
12	7 October 1972	Tottenham Hotspur	A	3–4	31,951	Ritchie 32', 51', Bloor 82'
13	14 October 1972	Newcastle United	H	2–0	21,205	Hurst 77', Robertson 90'
14	21 October 1972	Liverpool	A	1–2	43,604	Greenhoff 34'
15	28 October 1972	Leicester City	H	1–0	24,421	Hurst 9'
16	4 November 1972	Sheffield United	A	0–0	19,322	
17	11 November 1972	Southampton	H	3–3	17,772	Smith 5', Ritchie 45', Conroy 50'
18	18 November 1972	Birmingham City	H	1–2	23,046	Greenhoff 3'
19	25 November 1972	West Bromwich Albion	A	1–2	13,316	Hurst 38'
20	2 December 1972	Chelsea	H	1–1	21,274	Conroy 65'
21	9 December 1972	Manchester United	A	2–0	41,347	Pejic 17', Ritchie 42'
22	16 December 1972	West Ham United	A	2–3	23,269	Hurst 8', Ritchie 89'
23	23 December 1972	Derby County	H	4–0	23,084	Ritchie (2) 10', 58', Hurst 30', Greenhoff 36'
24	26 December 1972	Manchester City	A	1–1	36,334	Mahoney 65'
25	30 December 1972	Arsenal	H	0–0	24,586	
26	6 January 1973	Everton	A	0–2	26,818	
27	27 January 1973	Leeds United	A	0–1	33,487	
28	14 February 1973	Derby County	A	3–0	22,106	Mahoney 19', Robertson 44', Greenhoff 80'
29	17 February 1973	Crystal Palace	A	2–3	32,099	Greenhoff 56', Smith 68'
30	24 February 1973	West Ham United	H	2–0	21,885	Greenhoff 4', Robertson 15'
31	10 March 1973	Newcastle United	A	0–1	23,570	
32	14 March 1973	Tottenham Hotspur	H	1–1	23,351	Greenhoff 87'
33	17 March 1973	Liverpool	H	0–1	33,540	
34	24 March 1973	Leicester City	A	0–2	18,473	
35	26 March 1973	Coventry City	H	2–1	20,218	Ritchie 47', Haslegrave 64'
36	31 March 1973	West Bromwich Albion	H	2–0	21,296	Greenhoff 68', Hurst 70'
37	4 April 1973	Ipswich Town	H	1–0	18,319	Ritchie 13'
38	7 April 1973	Chelsea	A	3–1	19,706	Greenhoff 23', Ritchie 39', Haslegrave 78'
39	14 April 1973	Manchester United	H	2–2	36,051	Greenhoff 75', Ritchie 82'
40	21 April 1973	Birmingham City	A	1–3	32,513	Robertson 85'
41	24 April 1973	Wolverhampton Wanderers	H	2–0	25,251	Robertson 29', Greenhoff 87'
42	28 April 1973	Norwich City	H	2–0	19,350	Greenhoff 25', Ritchie 58'

=== FA Cup ===
Round	Date	Opponent	Venue	Result	Attendance	Scorers
R3	13 January 1973	Manchester City	A	2–3	38,648	Greenhoff (2) 22', 55'

=== League Cup ===
Round	Date	Opponent	Venue	Result	Attendance	Scorers
R2	6 September 1972	Sunderland	H	3–0	16,706	Greenhoff (2) 8', 70', Hurst 90'
R3	3 October 1972	Ipswich Town	A	2–1	14,602	Hurst 64', Ritchie 88'
R4	31 October 1972	Notts County	A	1–3	20,297	Bloor 80'

=== UEFA Cup ===
Round	Date	Opponent	Venue	Result	Attendance	Scorers
1st Round 1st Leg	13 September 1972	1. FC Kaiserslautern	H	3–1	22,182	Conroy 51', Hurst 72', Ritchie 85'
1st Round 2nd Leg	27 September 1972	1. FC Kaiserslautern	A	0–4	18,000	

=== Friendlies ===
Match	Opponent	Venue	Result
1	Doncaster Rovers	A	2–1
2	Carlisle United	A	3–3
3	Wolverhampton Wanderers	A	1–2
4	Crewe Alexandra	A	4–2
5	Brighton & Hove Albion	A	2–0
6	Persepolis	A	1–1
7	Western Australia	A	3–0
8	Southern Australia	A	2–2
9	New South Wales	A	3–1
10	Auckland	A	1–3
11	Wellington	A	5–1
12	Christchurch	A	4–2
13	Otago	A	8–1
14	New Caledonia	A	1–0
15	Tahiti	A	3–1

== Squad statistics ==
Pos.	Name	League		FA Cup		League Cup		UEFA Cup		Total	
Pos.	Name	Apps	Goals	Apps	Goals	Apps	Goals	Apps	Goals	Apps	Goals
GK	(England) Gordon Banks	8	0	0	0	2	0	1	0	11	0
GK	(England) John Farmer	33	0	1	0	0	0	1	0	35	0
GK	(Scotland) Mike McDonald	1	0	0	0	1	0	0	0	2	0
DF	(England) Alan Bloor	28	2	1	0	2	1	2	0	33	3
DF	(England) Alan Dodd	3	0	0	0	0	0	0	0	3	0
DF	(Northern Ireland) Alex Elder	1	0	0	0	0	0	0	0	1	0
DF	(England) Kevin Lewis	1	0	0	0	0	0	0	0	1	0
DF	(England) Jackie Marsh	38	0	1	0	3	0	2	0	44	0
DF	(England) Mike Pejic	38	2	1	0	3	0	2	0	44	2
DF	(England) Eric Skeels	30(1)	0	0	0	2	0	1	0	33(1)	0
DF	(England) Denis Smith	38(1)	4	1	0	2	0	2	0	43(1)	4
MF	(Republic of Ireland) Terry Conroy	29(4)	4	1	0	2(1)	0	2	1	34(5)	5
MF	(England) George Eastham	17(1)	0	1	0	0	0	0	0	18(1)	0
MF	(England) Sean Haslegrave	6	2	0	0	0	0	0	0	6	2
MF	(England) Stewart Jump	7(3)	0	0	0	1	0	0	0	8(3)	0
MF	(England) Terry Lees	7(1)	0	0	0	1	0	0	0	8(1)	0
MF	(Wales) John Mahoney	33(1)	2	1	0	2	0	2	0	38(1)	2
MF	(Scotland) Jimmy Robertson	27(4)	5	1	0	3	0	2	0	33(4)	5
MF	(Scotland) Willie Stevenson	1(1)	0	0	0	1	0	0	0	2(1)	0
FW	(England) Harry Burrows	0(2)	0	0	0	0	0	0	0	0(2)	0
FW	(England) Peter Dobing	8(2)	0	0	0	0(1)	0	0	0	8(3)	0
FW	(England) Jimmy Greenhoff	41	16	1	2	2	2	2	0	46	20
FW	(England) Geoff Hurst	38	10	0	0	3	2	2	1	43	13
FW	(England) John Ritchie	29(2)	14	1	0	3	1	2	1	35(2)	16
