= John Farmer (footballer) =

English footballer (born 1947)

Personal information
- Full name: John Farmer
- Date of birth: 31 August 1947 (age 79)
- Place of birth: Biddulph, England
- Position: Goalkeeper

Senior career*
Years	Team	Apps	(Gls)
1965–1974	Stoke City	163	(0)
1967	→ Cleveland Stokers (loan)	3	(0)
1975	→ Leicester City (loan)	2	(0)
1976	Northwich Victoria		
Total		168	(0)
- * Club domestic league appearances and goals

John Farmer (born 31 August 1947) is an English former footballer who played in the Football League for Leicester City and Stoke City.

== Career ==
Farmer was a product of Stoke City's youth system after being found playing amateur football in his local town of Biddulph. He broke into the first team in 1966 at the age of eighteen and is therefore one of the youngest keepers ever to play for the club. He initially began to play regularly for Stoke but when Farmer was 20 years old manager Tony Waddington signed England world cup winner Gordon Banks and Farmer lost his place as number one. He however resisted the chances to switch clubs and remained loyal to Stoke providing useful back-up to Banks. Farmer reclaimed his starting spot in 1972–73 as Banks was involved in a car crash which left him blind in one eye and as a result had to retire from playing top flight football.

He played regularly for three seasons until another England 'keeper, Peter Shilton joined Stoke in November 1974 for a then world record fee for a goalkeeper of £325,000. Farmer then joined the club that Shilton had come from, Leicester City, and played twice for the "Foxes" before returning to Stoke. He left Stoke at the end of the 1974–75 and went on to play for Northwich Victoria.

== Career statistics ==
Appearances and goals by club, season and competition
Club	Season	League			FA Cup		League Cup		Other		Total	
Club	Season	Division	Apps	Goals	Apps	Goals	Apps	Goals	Apps	Goals	Apps	Goals
Stoke City	1965–66	First Division	17	0	0	0	0	0	—		17	0
Stoke City	1966–67	First Division	34	0	1	0	1	0	—		36	0
Stoke City	1967–68	First Division	2	0	0	0	0	0	—		2	0
Stoke City	1968–69	First Division	12	0	0	0	2	0	—		14	0
Stoke City	1969–70	First Division	1	0	0	0	0	0	—		1	0
Stoke City	1970–71	First Division	3	0	0	0	1	0	2 (Note: Appearances in Anglo-Italian Cup and Texaco Cup)	0	6	0
Stoke City	1971–72	First Division	6	0	1	0	1	0	4 (Note: Appearances in Anglo-Italian Cup)	0	12	0
Stoke City	1972–73	First Division	33	0	1	0	0	0	1 (Note: Appearances in UEFA Cup)	0	35	0
Stoke City	1973–74	First Division	38	0	1	0	3	0	4 (Note: Three appearances in Watney Cup and one in Texaco Cup)	0	46	0
Stoke City	1974–75	First Division	17	0	0	0	5	0	2	0	24	0
Stoke City	Total		163	0	4	0	13	0	13	0	193	0
Cleveland Stokers (loan)	1967	United Soccer Association	3	0	—		—		—		3	0
Leicester City (loan)	1974–75	First Division	2	0	0	0	0	0	—		2	0
Career total			168	0	4	0	13	0	13	0	198	0

== Honours ==
Stoke City

- Football League Cup winner: 1972
