= 1969–70 Stoke City F.C. season =

Stoke City
1969–70 season
- Chairman: Albert Henshall
- Manager: Tony Waddington
- Stadium: Victoria Ground
- Football League First Division: 9th (45 Points)
- FA Cup: Fourth Round
- League Cup: Second Round
- Top goalscorer: League: Harry Burrows & John Ritchie (14); All: John Ritchie (16)
- Highest home attendance: 38,740 vs Manchester United (28 February 1970)
- Lowest home attendance: 11,804 vs West Bromwich Albion (15 April 1970)
- Average home league attendance: 24,165
Home colours

The 1969–70 season was Stoke City's 63rd season in the Football League and the 39th in the First Division.

Stoke seemingly had an abundance of talent emerging as the 1960s gave way for the 1970s and Waddington addressed the past two seasons lack of goals by bringing back John Ritchie from Sheffield Wednesday and Jimmy Greenhoff from Birmingham City. It was a promising season with Stoke finishing in 9th position with 45 points.

== Season review ==
=== League ===
After two poor seasons, Tony Waddington recognised the goalscoring shortcomings and won over some of the worried supporters by bringing in former Leeds United forward Jimmy Greenhoff for a club record £100,000 and also brought back John Ritchie from Sheffield Wednesday. There was certainly a feeling around Stoke, with the infusion of forward talent that the club was putting together a side that could cause a few raised eyebrows in the First Division and whilst Alex Elder and Tony Allen were early season selections in defence they were soon drifting from the spotlight allowing local defenders Jackie Marsh and Mike Pejic to break into the team.

With Gordon Banks in goals and the ever improving centre back pairing of 'hard men' Alan Bloor and Denis Smith, Stoke's back line looked solid. In midfield Irish winger Terry Conroy had now settled in England and was beginning to show his skill and pace on the wide positions. The improvements were there for all to see and the directors were keen to bring the best to the Victoria Ground and in September 1969 they achieved their aim. Brazilian star Pelé came over with his team Santos to play Stoke in a friendly, Pelé starring in a 3–2 win for the South Americans.

Early on in the 1969–70 season after winning six and drawing five for their first 15 matches, Stoke suffered a 6–2 reverse at Everton when John Farmer, making his only appearance of the season, was carried off due to injury and defender Denis Smith had to go in goal. They quickly put that defeat behind them and lost only once of the next ten matches. But an absence of victories between 17 January and 28 March saw the team slip down into mid-table and finished up in 9th spot, their highest league finish for 22 years.

=== FA Cup ===
Stoke advanced past Oxford United 3–2 in a replay following a goalless draw at the Manor Ground before being knocked at Watford.

=== League Cup ===
There was no progress in this seasons league cup, as Stoke lost 2–0 at home to Burnley.

== Final league table ==
Pos	Team	Pld	W	D	L	GF	GA	GAv	Pts	Qualification or relegation
7	Newcastle United	42	17	13	12	57	35	1.629	47	Qualification for the Inter-Cities Fairs Cup first round
8	Manchester United	42	14	17	11	66	61	1.082	45	Qualification for the Watney Cup (Note: Derby County and Manchester United qualified for the Watney Cup as the two teams with the most goals that hadn't already qualified for a European competition.)
9	Stoke City	42	15	15	12	56	52	1.077	45	
10	Manchester City	42	16	11	15	55	48	1.146	43	Qualification for the Cup Winners' Cup first round (Note: Manchester City qualified for the Cup Winners' Cup first round as the 1969–70 European Cup Winners' Cup winners.)
11	Tottenham Hotspur	42	17	9	16	54	55	0.982	43	

Source: World Football
Rules for classification: 1) Points; 2) Goal average; 3) Goals scored

== Results ==
Stoke's score comes first

=== Legend ===
Win	Draw	Loss

=== Football League First Division ===
Match	Date	Opponent	Venue	Result	Attendance	Scorers
1	9 August 1969	Wolverhampton Wanderers	A	1–3	33,260	Burrows
2	12 August 1969	Nottingham Forest	A	0–0	22,470	
3	16 August 1969	West Ham United	H	2–1	23,362	Dobing, Ritchie
4	20 August 1969	Nottingham Forest	H	1–1	20,029	Burrows
5	23 August 1969	Derby County	A	0–0	36,170	
6	27 August 1969	Coventry City	H	2–0	25,507	Conroy, Greenhoff
7	30 August 1969	Southampton	H	2–1	22,037	Burrows, Dobing
8	6 September 1969	Crystal Palace	A	1–3	26,745	Ritchie
9	13 September 1969	Sunderland	H	4–2	16,939	Ritchie (2), Greenhoff, Herd
10	17 September 1969	West Bromwich Albion	A	3–1	24,869	Ritchie, Greenhoff, Smith
11	20 September 1969	Liverpool	A	1–3	45,745	Burrows (pen)
12	27 September 1969	Manchester City	H	2–0	29,739	Ritchie, Greenhoff
13	4 October 1969	Leeds United	A	1–2	35,860	Greenhoff
14	6 October 1969	West Ham United	A	3–3	26,860	Burrows, Smith (2)
15	11 October 1969	Arsenal	H	0–0	25,801	
16	18 October 1969	Everton	A	2–6	48,684	Burrows, Dobing
17	25 October 1969	Tottenham Hotspur	H	1–1	19,550	Herd
18	1 November 1969	Manchester United	A	1–1	54,061	Burrows
19	8 November 1969	Burnley	H	2–1	18,434	Greenhoff, Eastham
20	15 November 1969	Sheffield Wednesday	A	2–0	16,444	Greenhoff, Ritchie
21	22 November 1969	Ipswich Town	H	3–3	19,285	Ritchie, Burrows (2) (1 pen)
22	6 December 1969	Newcastle United	H	0–1	17,767	
23	13 December 1969	Sunderland	A	3–0	15,205	Dobing, Burrows (2), (1 pen)
24	20 December 1969	Crystal Palace	H	1–0	12,426	Greenhoff
25	26 December 1969	Derby County	H	1–0	37,456	Burrows (pen)
26	27 December 1969	Southampton	A	0–0	23,215	
27	10 January 1970	Liverpool	H	0–2	30,038	
28	17 January 1970	Manchester City	A	1–0	31,565	Conroy
29	31 January 1970	Leeds United	H	1–1	36,506	Dobing
30	7 February 1970	Arsenal	A	0–0	26,363	
31	14 February 1970	Wolverhampton Wanderers	H	1–1	28,862	Pejic
32	21 February 1970	Tottenham Hotspur	A	0–1	29,972	
33	28 February 1970	Manchester United	H	2–2	38,740	Burrows, Smith
34	7 March 1970	Ipswich Town	A	1–1	16,139	Burrows
35	17 March 1970	Chelsea	A	0–1	28,996	
36	20 March 1970	Newcastle United	A	1–3	28,460	Ritchie
37	27 March 1970	Burnley	A	1–1	16,127	Stevenson
38	28 March 1970	Sheffield Wednesday	H	2–1	16,632	Ritchie (2) (1 pen)
39	30 March 1970	Everton	H	0–1	33,083	
40	4 April 1970	Coventry City	A	3–0	27,754	Ritchie (2), Dobing
41	13 April 1970	Chelsea	H	1–2	22,707	Stevenson
42	15 April 1970	West Bromwich Albion	H	3–2	11,804	Ritchie, Greenhoff, Bernard

=== FA Cup ===
Round	Date	Opponent	Venue	Result	Attendance	Scorers
R3	4 January 1970	Oxford United	A	0–0	15,686	
R3 Replay	7 January 1970	Oxford United	H	3–2	17,204	Stevenson, Ritchie (2)
R4	24 January 1970	Watford	A	0–1	23,354	

=== League Cup ===
Round	Date	Opponent	Venue	Result	Attendance	Scorers
R2	3 September 1969	Burnley	H	0–2	19,296	

=== Friendlies ===
Match	Opponent	Venue	Result
1	Asante Kotoko	H	3–2
2	Glentoran	A	2–0
3	Ards	A	1–2
4	Oldham Athletic	A	1–0
5	Norwich City	A	1–2
6	Port Vale	H	2–3
7	Bangor City	A	7–2
8	Dallas Tornado	H	6–1
9	DOS Utrecht	A	3–2
10	PSV Eindhoven	A	1–3
11	Santos	H	2–3

== Squad statistics ==
Pos.	Name	League		FA Cup		League Cup		Total	
Pos.	Name	Apps	Goals	Apps	Goals	Apps	Goals	Apps	Goals
GK	(England) Gordon Banks	38	0	3	0	1	0	42	0
GK	(England) Harry Dowd	3	0	0	0	0	0	3	0
GK	(England) John Farmer	1	0	0	0	0	0	1	0
DF	(England) Tony Allen	8	0	0	0	1	0	9	0
DF	(England) Alan Bloor	36	0	3	0	0	0	39	0
DF	(Northern Ireland) Alex Elder	8(1)	0	0	0	1	0	9(1)	0
DF	(Wales) Wyndham Evans	0	0	0	0	0	0	0	0
DF	(England) Jackie Marsh	36	0	3	0	1	0	40	0
DF	(England) Mike Pejic	32	1	3	0	0	0	35	1
DF	(England) Eric Skeels	34(1)	0	0(1)	0	1	0	35(2)	0
DF	(England) Denis Smith	40	4	3	0	1	0	44	4
MF	(England) Mike Bernard	9(2)	1	0	0	0	0	9(2)	1
MF	(Republic of Ireland) Terry Conroy	27(4)	2	2	0	0	0	29(4)	2
MF	(England) George Eastham	31(3)	1	2	0	1	0	34(3)	1
MF	(Wales) John Mahoney	2	0	0	0	0	0	2	0
MF	(Scotland) Willie Stevenson	18(2)	2	3	1	0	0	21(2)	3
FW	(England) Harry Burrows	31(3)	14	3	0	1	0	35(3)	14
FW	(England) Peter Dobing	40	6	3	0	1	0	44	6
FW	(England) Jimmy Greenhoff	33	9	3	0	1	0	37	9
FW	(Scotland) David Herd	4(5)	2	0	0	0	0	4(5)	2
FW	(England) John Ritchie	31(1)	14	2	2	1	0	34(1)	16
