= Alex Elder =

Northern Irish footballer (born 1941)

Personal information
- Full name: Alexander Russell Elder
- Date of birth: 25 April 1941 (age 85)
- Place of birth: Lisburn, Northern Ireland
- Height: 5 ft 10 1/2 in (1.79 m)
- Position: Defender

Senior career*
Years	Team	Apps	(Gls)
1956–1959	Glentoran	11	(0)
1959–1967	Burnley	271	(15)
1967–1973	Stoke City	83	(1)
1973–1975	Leek Town		
Total		365	(16)

International career
1960–1969	Northern Ireland	40	(1)
- * Club domestic league appearances and goals

Alexander Russell Elder (born 25 April 1941) is a Northern Irish former footballer who played for Burnley and Stoke City as well as the Northern Ireland national team.

He was said to play a mature game for someone with little experience of top-class football. Although not quick on the turn, he timed his tackles well and made good use of the ball.

== Career ==
=== Burnley ===
Elder was the very last piece in Harry Potts Championship jigsaw, signing aged 17 in January 1959 for £5,000 from Irish League club Glentoran. He spent the remainder of the 1958–59 season in the Burnley reserves, remaining there when the 1959–60 season began. By the eighth game of that season he made his first team debut against Preston and the great Tom Finney. Despite a 1–0 defeat Elder played well enough to retain his place and played in all but one of the remaining games that season. The 1959–60 season brought Burnley its second, and to date last, league championship. After a tense run-in with Wolves and Spurs, the other main title contenders, Burnley clinched the championship at Maine Road with a 2–1 victory on 2 May 1960. Elder admitted that he was fortunate as a young player to come into a side that included so many great players – including Jimmy Adamson and Jimmy McIlroy. Elder played in Burnley's European Cup campaign the following season and then in the FA Cup Final Wembley side of 1962. He forged a formidable full back partnership with John Angus and the two were only separated when Elder broke an ankle in pre-season training in 1963. In July 1965, Elder succeeded Brian Miller as club captain. Elder was just 26 when in August 1967 Burnley accepted £50,000 from Stoke City after making 330 appearances for the "Clarets" scoring 17 goals. While he was reluctant to leave, he admitted that his face did not fit in with the new coach, former teammate Jimmy Adamson. As a young Burnley player Elder was featured on the 'Look at Life' documentary series in the episode called 'The Ball at His Feet'. The programme covered the activities of apprentice footballers.

=== Stoke City ===
Elder made an unfortunate start to his Stoke career as in pre-season training for 1967–68 it took him until the end of October to make his debut and failed to reach the heights he set at Turf Moor and is considered to be one of Tony Waddington's worst signings. He played 44 games in 1968–69 and over the next four seasons he made 27 appearances and was released by the club after playing exactly 100 matches.

== International career ==
In April 1960 Elder made his international debut for Northern Ireland in a Home International Championship game in Wrexham against Wales. He won 34 caps while at Burnley and a further six after he transferred to Stoke. He also represented Northern Ireland at B, Under 23 and Schooboy level.

== Career statistics ==
=== Club ===
Appearances and goals by club, season and competition
Club	Season	League			FA Cup		League Cup		Other		Total	
Club	Season	Division	Apps	Goals	Apps	Goals	Apps	Goals	Apps	Goals	Apps	Goals
Burnley	1959–60	First Division	34	0	8	0	0	0	—		42	0
Burnley	1960–61	First Division	36	0	7	0	5	0	5 (Note: One appearances FA Charity Shield and four in European Cup)	0	42	0
Burnley	1961–62	First Division	41	0	8	1	0	0	—		49	1
Burnley	1962–63	First Division	41	1	3	1	0	0	—		44	1
Burnley	1963–64	First Division	19	1	5	0	0	0	—		24	1
Burnley	1964–65	First Division	34	4	5	0	0	0	—		39	4
Burnley	1965–66	First Division	39	6	3	0	4	0	—		46	6
Burnley	1966–67	First Division	27	3	0	0	6	0	—		33	3
Burnley	Total		271	15	39	2	15	0	5	0	330	17
Stoke City	1967–68	First Division	24	0	2	0	3	0	—		29	0
Stoke City	1968–69	First Division	38	1	4	0	2	0	—		44	1
Stoke City	1969–70	First Division	9	0	0	0	1	0	—		10	0
Stoke City	1970–71	First Division	5	0	3	0	0	0	1 (Note: Appearances in Anglo-Italian Cup)	0	9	0
Stoke City	1971–72	First Division	6	0	2	0	0	0	3	0	11	0
Stoke City	1972–73	First Division	1	0	0	0	0	0	0	0	1	0
Stoke City	Total		83	1	11	0	6	0	4	0	104	1
Career total			354	16	50	2	21	0	9	0	434	18

=== International ===
National team	Year	Apps	Goals
Northern Ireland	1960	4	0
Northern Ireland	1961	6	0
Northern Ireland	1962	4	0
Northern Ireland	1963	2	0
Northern Ireland	1964	6	0
Northern Ireland	1965	7	0
Northern Ireland	1966	4	1
Northern Ireland	1967	2	0
Northern Ireland	1968	1	0
Northern Ireland	1969	4	0
Total		40	1

== Honours ==
Burnley

- Football League First Division: 1959–60
- FA Cup runner-up: 1961–62
