= Gordon Banks =

English footballer (1937–2019)

Gordon Banks OBE
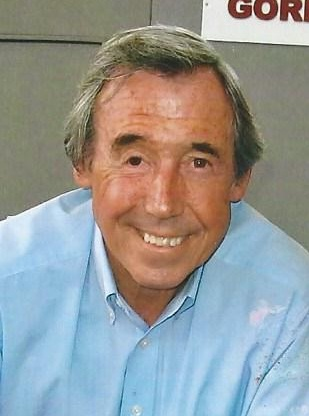
- Banks in 2007

Personal information
- Date of birth: 30 December 1937
- Place of birth: Sheffield, England
- Date of death: 12 February 2019 (aged 81)
- Place of death: Madeley, Staffordshire, England
- Height: 6 ft 0 in (1.83 m)
- Position: Goalkeeper

Youth career
- 1953: Millspaugh
- 1953: Rawmarsh Welfare
- 1953: Millspaugh
- 1953–1958: Chesterfield

Senior career*
Years	Team	Apps	(Gls)
1958–1959	Chesterfield	23	(0)
1959–1967	Leicester City	293	(0)
1967–1973	Stoke City	194	(0)
1967	→ Cleveland Stokers (loan)	7	(0)
1971	→ Hellenic (loan)	3	(0)
1977–1978	Fort Lauderdale Strikers	37	(0)
1977	→ St Patrick's Athletic (loan)	1	(0)
Total		558	(0)

International career
1961	England U23	2	(0)
1963–1972	England	73	(0)

Managerial career
- 1979–1980: Telford United
Medal record
Representing England
FIFA World Cup
Winner	1966
UEFA European Championship
Third place	1968
- * Club domestic league appearances and goals

Gordon Banks (30 December 1937 – 12 February 2019) was an English professional footballer who played as a goalkeeper. Widely regarded as one of the greatest goalkeepers of all time, he made 679 appearances during a 20-year professional career, and won 73 caps for England, highlighted by starting every game of the nation's 1966 World Cup victory.

Banks joined Chesterfield in March 1953 and played for their youth team in the 1956 FA Youth Cup final. He made his first-team debut in November 1958 and was sold to Leicester City for £7,000 in July 1959. He played in four cup finals for the club, as they were beaten in the 1961 and 1963 FA Cup finals before winning the League Cup in 1964 and finishing as finalists in 1965. Despite this success and his World Cup win in 1966, Banks was dropped by Leicester and sold to Stoke City for £50,000 in April 1967. In the 1970 World Cup, he made one of the game's greatest saves to prevent a Pelé goal, but was absent due to illness as England were beaten by West Germany in the quarter-finals.

Banks was Stoke City's goalkeeper in the 1972 League Cup win, the club's only major honour. He was still Stoke's and England's number one when a car crash in October 1972 cost him both the sight in his right eye and, eventually, his professional career. He played two last seasons in the United States for the Fort Lauderdale Strikers in 1977 and 1978, and despite only having the vision in one eye, was NASL Goalkeeper of the Year in 1977 after posting the best defensive record in the league. He briefly entered management with Telford United but left the game in December 1980.

Banks was named FWA Footballer of the Year in 1972 and was named FIFA Goalkeeper of the Year on six occasions. The IFFHS named Banks the second-best goalkeeper of the 20th century, after Lev Yashin.

== Early life ==
Banks was born in Abbeydale, Sheffield, on 30 December 1937, and brought up in the working-class area of Tinsley. The family later moved to the village of Catcliffe after his father set up a (then-illegal) betting shop. This brought greater prosperity but also misery; one day, Banks's disabled brother was mugged for the shop's daily takings and died of his injuries some weeks later. Banks left school in December 1952, aged 15, and took up employment as a bagger with a local coal merchant, which helped to build up his upper body strength. He spent a season playing for amateur side Millspaugh after their regular goalkeeper failed to turn up for a match; the club's trainer spotted Banks amongst the spectators and invited him to play in goal as he was aware that Banks had previously played for Sheffield Schoolboys. His performances there earned him a game in the Yorkshire League for Rawmarsh Welfare. However, a 12–2 defeat to Stocksbridge Works on his debut was followed by a 3–1 home defeat, and he was dropped by Rawmarsh and returned to Millspaugh. Still aged 15, he then switched jobs to become a hod carrier.

== Club career ==
=== Chesterfield ===
Banks was scouted by Chesterfield whilst playing for Millspaugh and offered a six-game trial in the youth team in March 1953. He impressed enough in these games to be offered a part-time £3-a-week contract by manager Teddy Davison in July 1953. The reserve team were placed in the Central League on account of a powerful club director rather than on merit, and Banks conceded 122 goals in the 1954–55 season as the "Spireites" finished in last place with only three victories. Banks was posted to Germany with the Royal Signals on national service, and won the Rhine Cup with his regimental team. He recovered from a fractured elbow to help the Chesterfield youth team to the 1956 final of the FA Youth Cup. There they were beaten 4–3 on aggregate by Manchester United's famous "Busby Babes"—a team that included both Wilf McGuinness and Bobby Charlton.

Banks was given his first-team debut by manager Doug Livingstone, at the expense of long-serving Ron Powell, in a Third Division game against Colchester United at Saltergate in November 1958. The game ended 2–2, and Banks kept his place against Norwich City in the following match; by the end of the 1958–59 season, he had missed only three games, those owing to injury. With no goalkeeping coach to guide him, Banks had to learn from his mistakes on the pitch, and he soon developed into a modern vocal goalkeeper who ordered the players in front of him into a more effective defence. Having just 23 league and three cup appearances to his name, it came as a surprise to Banks when Matt Gillies, manager of First Division club Leicester City, bought him from Chesterfield for £7,000 in July 1959; this also meant a wage increase to £15 a week.

=== Leicester City ===
Banks faced competition from five other goalkeepers, including 30-year-old Scotland international Johnny Anderson and 25-year-old Dave MacLaren. He started the 1959–60 season as the reserve team's goalkeeper. This, in effect, made him the club's second-choice, ahead of four of his rivals but behind first-team choice MacLaren. He had played four reserve team games when MacLaren picked up an injury, and manager Matt Gillies selected Banks for his Leicester debut against Blackpool at Filbert Street on 9 September. The match finished 1–1, with Jackie Mudie's strike cancelling out Ken Leek's opener. Banks retained his place for the 2–0 loss to Newcastle United at St James' Park three days later. With McLaren fit again, Banks was sent back to the reserves, but after the first team conceded 14 goals in the next five games, he was recalled and became the first-choice goalkeeper for the remainder of the season. The defensive record did not improve at first, with Banks conceding six in a heavy defeat by Everton at Goodison Park. Still, he improved in each match, and the Foxes settled for a comfortable 12th-place finish. In training, he worked extensively on improving his weaknesses, such as coming for crosses. He put in extra hours during training and came up with practice sessions to improve his skills – this was largely unique in an era where there were no specialized goalkeeping coaches. In the summer, both Anderson and MacLaren departed, leaving Banks as the club's undisputed number one ahead of a group of understudies.

Leicester finished sixth in 1960–61, and managed to beat champions Tottenham Hotspur at White Hart Lane. Yet their greatest accomplishment was in reaching the final of the FA Cup, with Banks conceding only five goals in their nine games en route to the final, and keeping three clean sheets in the semi-final and two replays against Sheffield United. Their opponents in the final at Wembley were Tottenham, who had already won the First Division title by an eight-point margin. Right-back Len Chalmers picked up a severe injury early in the match, and with Ken Leek dropped for disciplinary reasons in favour of rookie Hughie McIlmoyle, City were effectively playing with ten men and offered little threat going forward. Bobby Smith and Terry Dyson gave Spurs a 2–0 win and the first "double" of the 20th century, with Banks unable to prevent either goal.

The 1961–62 season proved to be highly disappointing, as Leicester finished 14th in the league and exited the FA Cup at the hands of Stoke City. The only highlight was the club's participation in the European Cup Winners' Cup, which put Banks in the difficult position of choosing to play for his club against Spanish club Atlético Madrid or choosing to attend the England versus Portugal match as a non-playing squad member. He elected to attend both games, leaving London at full-time to reach Leicester 30 minutes before the kick-off against Madrid. A last-minute goal earned the Spaniards a 1–1 draw at Filbert Street. In the return leg, Banks saved an Enrique Collar penalty, but Atlético were awarded a second penalty which Collar converted, and Leicester lost the game 2–0 (losing the tie 3–1 on aggregate).

Banks broke his nose at Craven Cottage on the opening day of the 1962–63 season, in a 2–1 defeat by Fulham. Leicester went to chase a possible double, reaching the FA Cup semi-finals whilst sitting on top of the table in April. City beat Liverpool 1–0 at Hillsborough to reach the final, with Banks keeping a clean sheet despite his goal being under a near-constant siege from the Merseyside club. The News of the World reported that Liverpool had had 34 attempts on goal to Leicester's one, and Banks later stated that it was his finest performance at club level. Unluckily, Banks then broke a finger in a 2–1 defeat by West Bromwich Albion at The Hawthorns, and was out injured as Leicester lost their final three league games, ending the season in a disappointing fourth place. In the 1963 FA Cup final Banks and the rest of the team underperformed, and lost the game 3–1 to Manchester United.

City ended the 1963–64 season in 11th place, having been inconsistent all season. Success instead came through the League Cup, as they beat West Ham United 6–3 over two legs in the semi-finals to reach the final against Stoke City. The opening tie at the Victoria Ground finished 1–1 in extremely muddy conditions as Banks spilled a shot from Bill Asprey, with Keith Bebbington pouncing on the rebound. Back at Filbert Street, goals from Mike Stringfellow, Dave Gibson and Howard Riley won the game for Leicester 3–2 and settled the tie at 4–3.

Banks started the 1964–65 season on wages of £40 a week, and the club only agreed to pay £60 a week in December. These miserly wages made it difficult for the club to spend the £80,000 it received from the sale of Frank McLintock – he had put in a transfer request over dissatisfaction with his pay and quality replacements were reluctant to join a club that paid full internationals like Banks and McLintock no more than the base rate that rival clubs paid to average players. Leicester finished 18th in the league and were knocked out of the FA Cup by Liverpool at Anfield in the sixth round. In the League Cup, City struggled to get past Peterborough United (in a replay), Grimsby Town and Crystal Palace (in a replay), before they recorded an 8–1 victory over Coventry City at Highfield Road. After easing past Plymouth Argyle in the semi-finals, Banks found himself playing in another League Cup final. However, Chelsea won the final after successfully defending their 3–2 win at Stamford Bridge with a goalless draw at Filbert Street.

Banks missed the first nine games of the 1965–66 season after breaking his wrist when diving at the feet of Northampton Town's Joe Kiernan in a pre-season friendly. Leicester finished the season in seventh spot and exited both cup competitions at the hands of Manchester City.

Despite being a World Cup winner in the summer of 1966, Banks was dropped towards the end of the 1966–67 season in favour of highly promising teenage reserve Peter Shilton. Manager Matt Gillies was blunt, telling Banks "we [Gillies and the club's directors] think your best days are behind you, and you should move on". Teammate Richie Norman told Banks that Gillies was pressured into the decision, Shilton having told the board he would leave the club unless he was given first-team football. Banks was transfer listed at £50,000, the same price the club received for Derek Dougan in March 1967. However, many of the big clubs were unwilling to spend such a sum on a goalkeeper. Liverpool manager Bill Shankly showed strong interest, but could not convince the club's board of directors to agree to such a large fee for a goalkeeper. West Ham United manager Ron Greenwood was prepared to match the fee, but instead signed Kilmarnock's Bobby Ferguson for £65,000 because he had already agreed terms with Kilmarnock and did not want to go back on his word. Terms were instead agreed with Stoke City, a mid-table First Division side.

=== Stoke City ===
"I've not come here to retire you know. I've come to here to win something."

— Banks speaking upon signing with the club after critics questioned Waddington's policy of signing veteran players.

On leaving Filbert Street, Banks requested a loyalty bonus from Leicester and was told by Matt Gillies, "We've decided not to pay you a penny. There's to be no compensation payment and that's final." Banks then refused the move until Stoke boss Tony Waddington seemingly negotiated a £2,000 payment out of Leicester. It was only some years later that Banks was informed that Stoke had made the payment, not Leicester. Waddington valued good goalkeepers highly, and the two built up a close relationship. During this time, Banks moved to Madeley, Staffordshire. He replaced John Farmer as the club's number one, and kept goal in the last four games of the 1966–67 season, making his home debut at the Victoria Ground in a 3–1 win over his former club Leicester.

Banks fitted in well at Stoke, as Waddington built a team of veteran players who were judged by some to be past their best. The Potters struggled near the foot of the First Division table in the 1967–68 and 1968–69 campaigns, before rising to ninth place in the 1969–70 season. Banks remained a reliable stopper for the club. However, on 1 March 1969, he was knocked unconscious at Roker Park by Sunderland's Malcolm Moore, and his replacement David Herd conceded four goals in a 4–1 defeat. Banks also played a season for the Cleveland Stokers of the American United Soccer Association in the summer of 1968: he played seven of the short-lived club's 12 games in Cleveland, Ohio.

Banks made what he believed to be three of the best saves of his career in a Stoke shirt. In the first instance, he saved and caught a powerful and well-placed header from Manchester City's Wyn Davies from 8 yards (7.3 m) out; in the second case he saved a Francis Lee header at Maine Road; and he made his third great save for the club by catching a volley from Tottenham Hotspur's Alan Gilzean that had been hit from 6 yards (5.5 m) out at White Hart Lane.

Stoke began to compete for honours in the 1970–71 season, though despite impressive victories against the top two clubs—Arsenal and Leeds United—City ended the season in mid-table obscurity. The club's great achievement was in reaching the semi-finals of the FA Cup, beating Millwall, Huddersfield Town, Ipswich Town and Hull City en route. Facing Arsenal at Hillsborough in the semi-finals, they lost a two-goal lead to draw 2–2, and were then beaten 2–0 in the replay at Villa Park.

Despite another mid-table finish in 1971–72, Stoke beat Chesterfield, Tranmere Rovers, Hull City and Manchester United to reach another FA Cup semi-final. They again faced Arsenal, and once more, a draw at Villa Park meant a replay at Goodison Park. The Gunners' goals in a 2–1 victory came from a disputed Frank McLintock penalty and a John Radford goal that television replays showed was clearly offside. In a May 2011 interview, Banks said that he still felt "cheated" out of a chance to play for the club in an FA Cup final. Stoke and Banks found solace in the League Cup, though it took them 11 matches to reach the final after overcoming Southport, then Oxford United in a replay, Manchester United in a second replay, Bristol Rovers, and then West Ham United in a second replay following an aggregate draw after two legs. In extra time of the second leg with West Ham, Banks fouled Harry Redknapp, conceding a penalty, and then saved Geoff Hurst's powerful spot-kick to keep City in the competition. They then faced Chelsea in the final at Wembley. Peter Osgood beat Banks with a hooked shot just before half-time, but goals from Terry Conroy and George Eastham won Stoke the game 2–1. At the end of the season, Banks was named the FWA Footballer of the Year, becoming the first goalkeeper to receive the honour since Bert Trautmann in 1956.

On 22 October 1972, while driving home from a session of work on his injured shoulder with the Stoke physiotherapist, Banks lost control of his new Ford Consul (a re-badged Ford Granada Mk I) car, which ended up in a ditch. He had attempted to overtake a car on a sharp bend and collided with an oncoming Austin A60 van. He was taken to the North Staffordshire Hospital and, during an operation, received 200 stitches in his face and over 100 micro-stitches inside the socket of his right eye, and was told the chances of saving the sight in his eye were 50–50. His sight never returned, and as the loss of binocular vision severely limited his abilities as a goalkeeper, he retired from professional football the following summer.

=== Fort Lauderdale Strikers ===
In April 1977, he went on to play as a named superstar in the North American Soccer League (NASL) for Fort Lauderdale Strikers. The Strikers won their division in 1977, and Banks was named NASL Goalkeeper of the Year after he conceded only 29 goals in 26 games—the best defensive record in the NASL. He also played one League of Ireland game for St Patrick's Athletic, keeping a clean sheet in a 1–0 win over Shamrock Rovers at Richmond Park on 2 October 1977. He returned to Fort Lauderdale and played 11 games in the 1978 season.

== International career ==
Banks was capped twice for the England under-23 side, in matches against Wales and Scotland in 1961.

Ron Springett was the goalkeeper for England as Banks rose to prominence. Still, after the 1962 World Cup in Chile, a new coach was appointed in former England right-back Alf Ramsey. Ramsey demanded sole control of the team and began looking towards the next World Cup. Banks won his first cap on 6 April 1963 against Scotland at Wembley, after Springett was dropped following a poor performance. England lost 2–1, though Banks was blameless as Scotland's goals came firstly from an error by Jimmy Armfield and then secondly from the penalty spot. He was picked for the next match against Brazil, which ended in a creditable 1–1 draw after Bryan Douglas cancelled out Pepe's opener. Banks continued to play consistently to become established as England's first-choice goalkeeper. In 1963, he was picked to play against the Rest of the World, in a celebration match to mark 100 years of The Football Association.

Banks also played in two of England's three games at the "Little World Cup" in Brazil in the summer of 1964, a 1–1 draw with Portugal and a 1–0 defeat to Argentina. Blackpool's Tony Waiters won five caps in the England goal in 1964 but found that his challenge to Banks's first-team place came to an end after he conceded five goals to Brazil. During England's summer of 1965 tour he built up a solid understanding with his defenders—George Cohen, Jack Charlton, Bobby Moore, and Ray Wilson—as he only conceded two goals in four matches against Hungary, Yugoslavia, West Germany, and Sweden. They then played seven friendlies in 1966 in the build-up to the World Cup, though the team passed their biggest test of character in the British Home Championship, beating Scotland 4–3 in front of a crowd of over 130,000 at Hampden Park. Going into the competition, the only defeat in 21 matches since the "Little World Cup" came against Austria, in a game that Banks missed due to injury.

=== 1966 World Cup ===
Banks entered the 1966 FIFA World Cup as England's first-choice goalkeeper, and his understudies Ron Springett and Peter Bonetti never took to the field during the tournament. England opened the tournament with a goalless draw against Uruguay, with Banks a virtual spectator as the highly defensive Uruguayans rarely ventured out of their half. They then defeated Mexico 2–0, with Banks again rarely troubled throughout. A 2–0 win over France then took England through the group stage without Banks conceding a goal.

England beat Argentina 1–0 in the last eight, with Geoff Hurst scoring with a header; the match was sullied by the first-half sending off of Argentinian midfielder Antonio Rattín, who refused to leave the pitch after being dismissed for dissent. In contrast to the previous games, the semi-final against Portugal proved to be a fair contest between two sides of talented players eager to attack from the start of the match. Yet there was panic in the buildup to the game as trainer Harold Shepherdson forgot to buy chewing gum, which Banks used to make his hands stickier and better able to handle the ball, and so Shepherdson had to run to a nearby newsagents to purchase gum as the teams were in the tunnel. Bobby Charlton scored two goals, but Portugal made a strong finish and won a penalty on 82 minutes after Jack Charlton handled the ball in the penalty area. Eusébio converted the penalty after sending Banks the wrong way, and the game finished 2–1 in England's favour. This was the first goal Banks had conceded for England in 721 minutes of regular play since giving up Scotland's last goal after 81 minutes of the Home International clash in April. This remained a record for an England goalkeeper until 2021 when it was broken by Jordan Pickford.

England's opponents in the final were West Germany. It was England who dominated the final, but it was Banks who was beaten first. A weak header from Ray Wilson handed a chance to Helmut Haller, who sent an accurate but relatively weak shot into the corner of the net; Banks had been unsighted by Jack Charlton, and he failed to adjust his position in time to reach the ball. England equalised through a Geoff Hurst header within six minutes and went ahead late in the second half through Martin Peters. With seconds left in the game, Lothar Emmerich sent a free kick into the England penalty area, and the ball fell to Wolfgang Weber, who guided the ball over a lunging Ray Wilson and an outstretched Banks into the net to take the game into extra-time. In extra time, the Germans sent shots in at the England goal, which Banks managed to catch and control without any great danger. Hurst scored two goals to complete his hat-trick, and though many claimed his second goal never crossed the line Banks always maintained his belief that the officials called the decision correctly. Between these goals, Banks had to deal with a fiery shot from Sigfried Held and was later exposed only for Uwe Seeler to come just centimetres away from connecting with the ball.

=== Euro 1968 ===
Scotland were the first team to beat the world champions, as goals from Denis Law, Bobby Lennox and Jim McCalliog secured a 3–2 victory at Wembley on 15 April 1967. Despite this set-back, England qualified for UEFA Euro 1968, which consisted of just four teams: England, Italy (hosts), the Soviet Union, and Yugoslavia. England played just two games at the tournament, losing 1–0 to Yugoslavia, and then beating the Soviets 2–0 in the third-place play-off.

=== 1970 World Cup ===
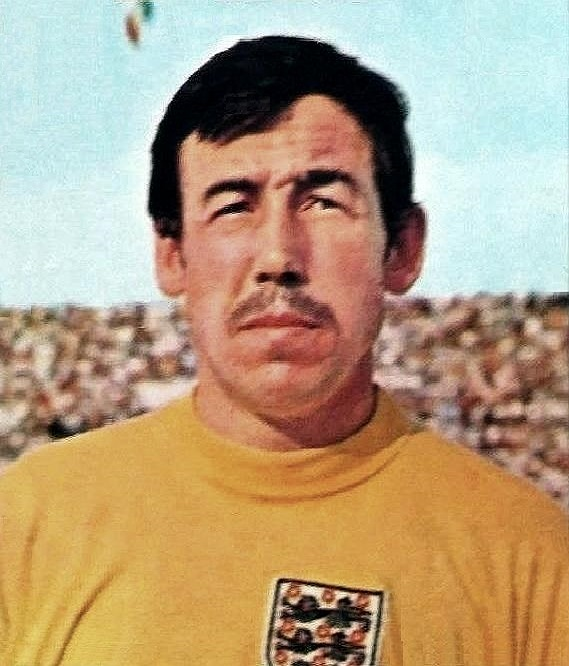
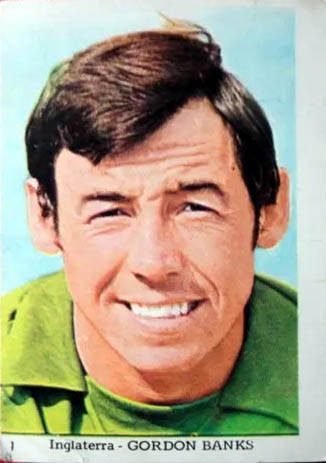
Trading cards of Banks with England by Italian Panini (left) and Chapitas in Argentina (right), both issued in 1970

Banks went into the 1970 World Cup as England's number one with 59 caps to his name, and had Peter Bonetti (six caps) and Alex Stepney (one cap) as his understudies. He found the heat and altitude at Guadalajara, Mexico difficult to cope with. The team's efforts at acclimatisation were not helped when Bobby Moore was falsely accused of stealing the infamous "Bogotá Bracelet". Despite this, a Geoff Hurst goal was enough to beat their first opponents, Romania. A far tougher test awaited on 7 June, when England faced Brazil. The day before the match, Banks was informed that he had been awarded an OBE.

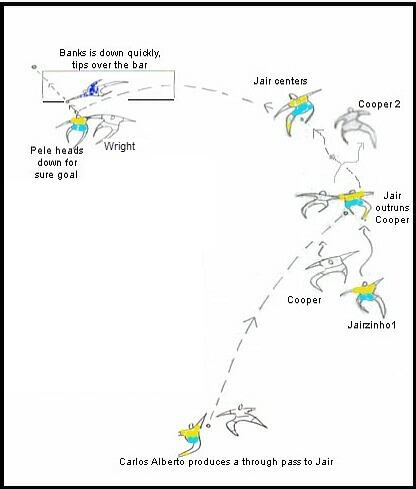
Image describing Banks's save v Pelé in the 1970 World Cup, Mexico

Playing at pace, Brazil were putting England under enormous pressure and an attack was begun by captain Carlos Alberto who sent a low ball down the right flank for the speedy Jairzinho to latch on to. The Brazilian winger sped past left-back Terry Cooper and crossed the ball into the six-yard box, where Pelé connected with a powerful header to send the ball low towards the right-hand corner of the goal. In the knowledge that his header was placed to perfection, Pelé immediately shouted "Gol!" (Brazilian Portuguese for goal).

The split-second incident only allowed Banks time for one conscious thought – that the shot was impossible to catch, and the only way to prevent Pelé from following up on the rebound would be to parry the ball over the bar. The ball bounced 2 yards (1.8 m) in front of the goal-line, and Banks managed to make contact with the ball with the fingers of his right hand and rolled his hand slightly to angle the ball over the crossbar. He landed in the inner netting of the goal and knew he had saved the ball after seeing Pelé's reaction. Banks then rose to his feet to defend the corner and broke into laughter after the following exchange:

"I thought that was a goal." (Pelé)
"You and me both." (Banks)
"You're getting old, Banksy, you used to hold on to them." (Bobby Moore)

Pelé and numerous journalists and pundits would later describe the save as the greatest in the game's history. Banks later said "They won't remember me for winning the World Cup, it'll be for that save. That's how big a thing it is. People just want to talk about that save." In 2002 the UK public voted the save No. 41 in the list of the 100 Greatest Sporting Moments.

Brazil won 1–0 after Jairzinho beat Banks in the second half. England ultimately joined Brazil in the last eight after a win in the final group game against Czechoslovakia. The reward was a rematch of the 1966 final against West Germany.

The day before the West Germany game, England's hopes of making further inroads into the World Cup were dented when Banks complained of an upset stomach. He became affected by violent stomach cramps and aching limbs and spent his time in the bathroom sweating, shivering and vomiting. He passed an extremely undemanding fitness test but suffered a relapse shortly before the game, and Ramsey was forced to rest him and play Peter Bonetti in his place. Ramsey remarked that "of all the players to lose, we had to lose him." Banks watched the game on television at the hotel as England lost a two-goal lead to be eliminated 3–2 after extra time. Due to a delay in the broadcast, he switched the television off, with England 2–0 in the lead, as Bobby Moore returned to the hotel to break the news of the defeat. Suspicions later surfaced that Banks had been poisoned by the CIA to take him out of the game. Banks himself never believed this theory.

=== Final years ===
Only four teams competed in UEFA Euro 1972: Belgium (hosts), Hungary, the Soviet Union, and West Germany. England came close to qualifying but lost 3–1 to West Germany in the final round of qualifying.

On 15 May 1971, Banks was involved in a notorious incident with George Best who, while playing against England for Northern Ireland, flicked the ball out of Banks's hands and headed it into the net. The move was audacious, but was disallowed by the referee, who judged it to be dangerous play. Banks played his 73rd and final game for England on 27 May 1972, in a 1–0 win over Scotland at Hampden Park. During his 73 international games, he kept 35 clean sheets and lost just nine games.

== Coaching career ==
In December 1977, he was appointed as a coach at Port Vale by manager Dennis Butler, being demoted to reserve coach in October 1978 by new boss Alan Bloor. Banks enjoyed coaching but soon resigned his position, feeling that players such as Bernie Wright refused to take his advice on board. He applied for the vacant management positions at Lincoln City and Rotherham United, but was rejected. He instead accepted the role as manager of Alliance Premier League part-time club Telford United. He signed a goalkeeper, centre-half and centre-forward from Bangor City for £1,500, as well as former Stoke striker John Ruggiero. The "Bucks" finished in 13th place in 1979–80.

In November 1980, he left Jackie Mudie in temporary charge of team affairs whilst he underwent surgery and led the club to defeat in the FA Trophy at the hands of a lower league club. On his return to the club Banks was sacked. He was offered the position of raffle ticket seller and accepted the post in the belief that it would entitle him to the money owed to him in the terms of his management contract; he eventually had to settle for 50% of his contract. He later stated that "It broke my heart ... I did not want to stay in the game."

== Style of play ==
Banks was a goalkeeper who was characterized by significant physical strength, athleticism, and shot-stopping abilities. His playing style involved positional sense, handling, awareness, composure, and mental strength, as well as agility, speed, and quick reflexes, which enabled him to produce acrobatic saves.

== Personal life and health ==
Banks first met his wife, Ursula, during his national service in Germany in 1955. They married in 1957 and had three children: Robert, Julia and Wendy. He separated from Ursula during his time in America. Still, the couple reunited when Banks returned to England.

In October 1972, Banks was involved in a car crash in his Ford Consul while driving on the wrong side of the road, close to his home in Madeley Heath. Fragments of glass had perforated his right eye and damaged the retina, requiring 100 micro stitches to the eye and a further 200 to his face.

Banks's nephew is Nick Banks, drummer of the band Pulp.

Shortly after his retirement, Banks was surprised by Eamonn Andrews for an episode of This Is Your Life. He later fronted a Leicester-based hospitality company. He lost a significant sum of money when the business failed but was helped out by Leicester City, who offered him a belated testimonial match. He was appointed as Stoke City's president following the death of Stanley Matthews. From the 1980s he was a member of the three-man pools panel.

In 2001, he sold his World Cup winners medal at Christie's for £124,750, and his international cap from the final was also sold for £27,025.

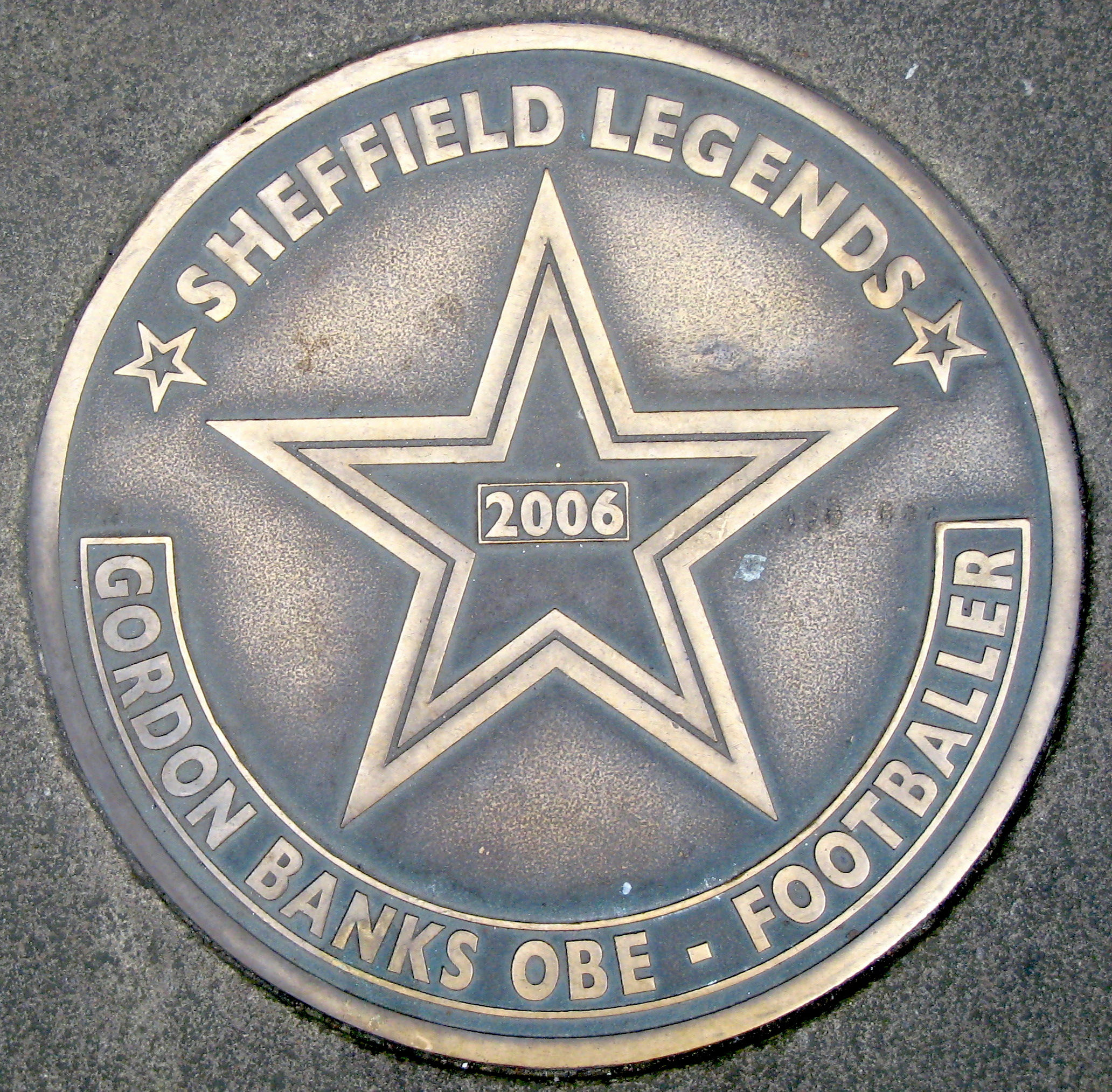
Sheffield Walk of Fame

Banks was an Inaugural Inductee to the English Football Hall of Fame in 2002. In March 2004, he was named by Pelé as one of the world's 125 greatest living footballers. He was awarded an honorary doctorate from Keele University in February 2006. In May 2006, Banks was the first 'legend' to be inducted into a new Walk of Fame, by having a plaque installed in the pavement in front of Sheffield Town Hall. In July 2008, Pelé unveiled a statue of Banks outside the Britannia Stadium. In March 2011, he was also inducted into the City of Stoke-on-Trent Hall of Fame, along with Roy Sproson. Pelé became a good friend of Banks and following his death the Brazilian described Banks as a "goalkeeper with magic".

In 1980, Banks published his first autobiography, Banks of England. He published a more comprehensive autobiography in 2002: Banksy: My Autobiography. Irish investigative author, Don Mullan, published a boyhood memoir in 2006 called Gordon Banks – A Hero Who Could Fly in which he wrote about the influence of the England goalkeeper on his life.

In December 2015, it was announced Banks was receiving treatment for kidney cancer. He died from cancer in his sleep at his home in Madeley, Staffordshire, 12 February 2019 at the age of 81. Banks's funeral took place on 4 March 2019 at Stoke Minster. His pallbearers were goalkeepers representing his former teams; Joe Anyon (Chesterfield), Jack Butland (Stoke City), Joe Hart (England) and Kasper Schmeichel (Leicester City).

== Career statistics ==
=== Club ===
Appearances and goals by club, season and competition
Club	Season	League			National cup (Note: Includes FA Cup, FAI Cup)		League cup (Note: Includes Football League Cup, League of Ireland Cup)		Continental		Other		Total	
Club	Season	Division	Apps	Goals	Apps	Goals	Apps	Goals	Apps	Goals	Apps	Goals	Apps	Goals
Chesterfield	1958–59	Third Division	23	0	3	0	—		—		—		26	0
Leicester City	1959–60	First Division	32	0	4	0	—		—		—		36	0
Leicester City	1960–61	First Division	40	0	10	0	1	0	—		—		51	0
Leicester City	1961–62	First Division	41	0	2	0	1	0	4 (Note: Appearances in European Cup Winners' Cup)	0	—		48	0
Leicester City	1962–63	First Division	38	0	6	0	2	0	—		—		46	0
Leicester City	1963–64	First Division	36	0	1	0	8	0	—		—		45	0
Leicester City	1964–65	First Division	38	0	6	0	9	0	—		—		53	0
Leicester City	1965–66	First Division	32	0	4	0	1	0	—		—		37	0
Leicester City	1966–67	First Division	36	0	1	0	3	0	—		—		40	0
Leicester City	Total		293	0	34	0	25	0	4	0	0	0	356	0
Stoke City	1966–67	First Division	4	0	0	0	0	0	—		—		4	0
Stoke City	1967–68	First Division	39	0	2	0	4	0	—		—		45	0
Stoke City	1968–69	First Division	30	0	4	0	0	0	—		—		34	0
Stoke City	1969–70	First Division	38	0	3	0	1	0	—		—		42	0
Stoke City	1970–71	First Division	39	0	10	0	1	0	—		5 (Note: Four appearances in Anglo-Italian Cup and one in Texaco Cup)	0	55	0
Stoke City	1971–72	First Division	36	0	8	0	11	0	—		4 (Note: Appearances in Texaco Cup)	0	59	0
Stoke City	1972–73	First Division	8	0	0	0	2	0	1 (Note: Appearances in UEFA Cup)	0	—		11	0
Stoke City	Total		194	0	27	0	19	0	1	0	9	0	250	0
Cleveland Stokers (loan)	1967	United Soccer Association	7	0	—		—		—		—		7	0
Hellenic (loan)	1971	National Football League	3	0	—		—		—		—		3	0
Fort Lauderdale Strikers	1977	North American Soccer League	26	0	—		—		—		2 (Note: Appearances in North American Soccer League play-offs)	0	28	0
Fort Lauderdale Strikers	1978	North American Soccer League	11	0	—		—		—		—		11	0
Fort Lauderdale Strikers	Total		37	0	—		—		—		2	0	39	0
St Patrick's Athletic (loan)	1977–78	League of Ireland	1	0	0	0	0	0	—		—		1	0
Career total			558	0	64	0	44	0	5	0	11	0	682	0

=== International ===
Appearances and goals by national team and year
National team	Year	Apps	Goals
England	1963	7	0
England	1964	7	0
England	1965	7	0
England	1966	15	0
England	1967	4	0
England	1968	6	0
England	1969	6	0
England	1970	10	0
England	1971	7	0
England	1972	4	0
Total		73	0

== Honours ==
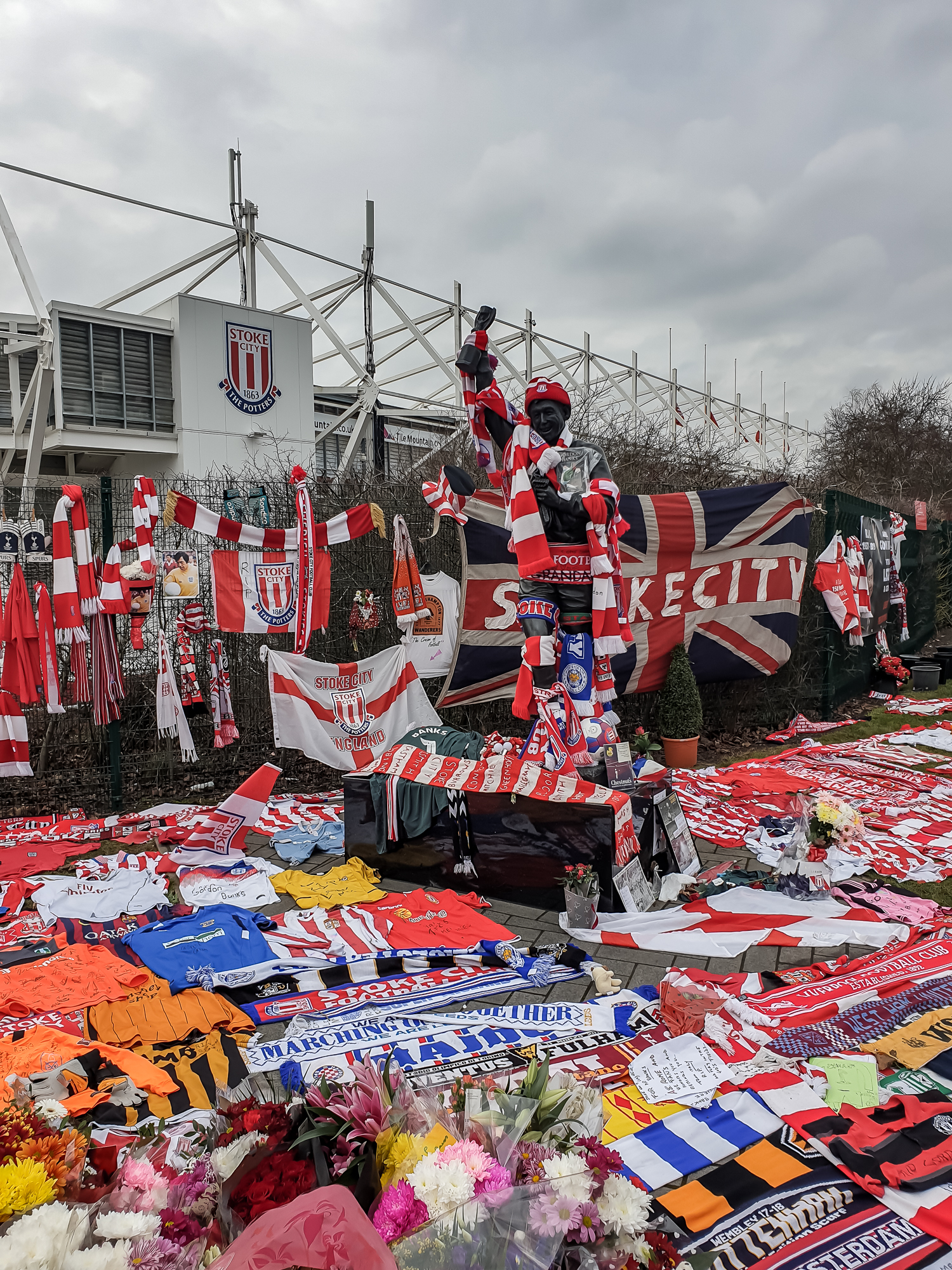
Gordon Banks statue outside the Britannia Stadium after his death

Leicester City

- Football League Cup: 1963–64; runner-up: 1964–65
- FA Cup runner-up: 1960–61, 1962–63

Stoke City

- Football League Cup: 1971–72

England

- FIFA World Cup: 1966
- UEFA European Championship third-place: 1968
- British Home Championship: 1964 (shared), 1965, 1966, 1968, 1969, 1970 (shared), 1971, 1972

Individual

- FIFA Goalkeeper of the Year: 1966, 1967, 1968, 1969, 1970, 1971
- FIFA World Cup All-Star Team: 1966
- Ballon d'Or Nominated: 1966, 1970, 1972
- World XI: 1969, 1971, 1972
- FUWO European Team of the Season: 1969, 1970
- Rothman's Golden Boot Awards: 1970, 1971, 1972
- Officer of the Order of the British Empire: 1970
- Daily Express Sportsmen of the Year: 1971, 1972
- Sport Ideal European XI: 1971, 1972
- FWA Footballer of the Year: 1972
- Football League 100 Legends: 1998
- English Football Hall of Fame: 2002
- NASL All-Stars: 1977
- NASL Goalkeeper of the Year: 1977
- World Soccer Greatest Players of the 20th Century: 32nd
- FIFA 100: 2004
- PFA Team of the Century (1907–1976): 2007
- Freedom of the City of Stoke-on-Trent 16 October 2014.
- Freedom of the Borough of Newcastle-under-Lyme 23 February 2018.
