= 1970–71 Stoke City F.C. season =

Stoke City
1970–71 season
- Chairman: Albert Henshall
- Manager: Tony Waddington
- Stadium: Victoria Ground
- Football League First Division: 13th (37 points)
- FA Cup: Semi-final
- League Cup: Second round
- Texaco Cup: First round
- Anglo-Italian Cup: Group Stage
- Top goalscorer: League: John Ritchie (13); All: John Ritchie (19)
- Highest home attendance: 39,889 vs Manchester United (20 March 1971)
- Lowest home attendance: 13,358 vs Manchester City (14 April 1971)
- Average home league attendance: 19,905
Home colours

The 1970–71 season was Stoke City's 64th season in the Football League and the 40th in the First Division.

Stoke had a successful season making it to the semi-final of the FA Cup for only the second time in their history. Stoke made it through seven matches before facing Arsenal, where after building a 2–0 lead at Hillsborough Stoke let slip in the final few minutes and Arsenal levelled at 2–2. In the replay the "Gunners" won 2–0 at Villa Park. In the league Stoke finished in a mid-table position of 13th with 37 points, Stoke did record a famous win over Arsenal beating the eventual league champions 5–0 in September.

== Season review ==
=== League ===
Stoke had a good opening spell to the 1970–71 season, losing just three of their first 12 matches one of which was a crushing 5–2 defeat at Midlands rivals West Bromwich Albion. But generally the defence looked strong and solid and indeed six clean sheets were kept during that period. Stoke's sixth home game of the season on 26 September was against Bertie Mee's impressive Arsenal side at the Victoria Ground. Because of local travel difficulties (bus driver strike) just over 18,000 fans saw the match and those lucky enough to be there watch one of the best performances by a Stoke City side.

Arsenal, who would go on to become First Division and FA Cup winners were well beaten 5–0 by Stoke in front of the Match of the Day cameras. As the season wore on Stoke found it difficult to maintain a consistent run of form in the First Division and their attentions soon turned towards the FA Cup. With the cup a distraction Stoke did well to finish in a mid table position of 13th.

=== FA Cup ===
After Christmas Stoke became heavily involved in the FA Cup and they came very close to making it to their first final. Revenge was gained over Millwall in the third round and then Huddersfield Town proved to be difficult to get the better of, the tie finally being decided in a second replay at Old Trafford, Stoke winning 1–0 thanks to a goal from Jimmy Greenhoff. In the fifth round Stoke met Ipswich Town and after a goalless draw, Denis Smith scoring the only goal at Portman Road to send Stoke through to face Hull City in the quarter-final. The tie at Boothferry Park was a cracking encounter with Stoke winning 3–2 to claim a place in the semi-final for the first time since 1899, 75 years ago.

Their opponents in the semi-final were Arsenal with the tie played at Hillsborough Stadium in Sheffield. Stoke produced a dominant first half display and went into the half time break 2–0 up, with Smith and Ritchie scoring the goals that sent Stoke supporters ecstatic. Alas it was not to be as Arsenal clawed their way back into the match thanks to two second half goals from Peter Storey with the last being a penalty in the last minute of the game. Stoke were left to rue only scoring two goals in their first half dominance as the "Gunners" earned a replay they hardly deserved. Villa Park was the venue for 'part two' of the contest and in front of 62,356, Arsenal comfortably won 2–0 and went on to lift the trophy and complete a domestic double alongside their First Division league title. On the eve of the final, Stoke won the third place play off against Everton 3–2.

=== League Cup ===
Millwall knocked Stoke out of the League Cup 2–1 in the second round.

== Final league table ==
Pos	Team	Pld	W	D	L	GF	GA	GAv	Pts
11	Manchester City	42	12	17	13	47	42	1.119	41
12	Newcastle United	42	14	13	15	44	46	0.957	41
13	Stoke City	42	12	13	17	44	48	0.917	37
14	Everton	42	12	13	17	54	60	0.900	37
15	Huddersfield Town	42	11	14	17	40	49	0.816	36

Source: World Football
Rules for classification: 1) Points; 2) Goal average; 3) Goals scored

== Results ==
Stoke's score comes first

=== Legend ===
Win	Draw	Loss

=== Football League First Division ===
Match	Date	Opponent	Venue	Result	Attendance	Scorers
1	15 August 1970	Ipswich Town	H	0–0	17,099	
2	19 August 1970	Newcastle United	H	3–0	15,197	Burrows 22', Ritchie (2) 38', 89'
3	22 August 1970	Derby County	A	0–2	35,461	
4	26 August 1970	West Bromwich Albion	A	2–5	22,607	Ritchie 12', Conroy 55'
5	29 August 1970	Crystal Palace	H	0–0	13,469	
6	2 September 1970	Nottingham Forest	H	0–0	13,951	
7	5 September 1970	Wolverhampton Wanderers	A	1–1	21,056	Greenhoff 25'
8	12 September 1970	Leeds United	H	3–0	22,592	Ritchie (2) 20', 90', Burrows 47'
9	19 September 1970	Manchester City	A	1–4	35,473	Bernard 80'
10	26 September 1970	Arsenal	H	5–0	18,153	Ritchie (2) 28', 43', Conroy 62', Greenhoff 64', Bloor 84'
11	3 October 1970	Blackpool	A	1–1	25,324	Dobing 56'
12	10 October 1970	West Ham United	H	2–1	23,033	Greenhoff 36', Dobing 89'
13	17 October 1970	Ipswich Town	A	0–2	18,159	
14	24 October 1970	Tottenham Hotspur	A	0–3	36,238	
15	31 October 1970	Huddersfield Town	H	3–1	17,625	Greenhoff 5', Conroy (2) 54', 75'
16	7 November 1970	Manchester United	A	2–2	47,451	Conroy 1', Ritchie 72'
17	14 November 1970	Everton	H	1–1	26,240	Ritchie 42'
18	18 November 1970	Leeds United	A	1–4	25,004	Conroy 15'
19	21 November 1970	Chelsea	A	1–2	36,227	T Smith 30'
20	28 November 1970	Southampton	H	0–0	16,848	
21	5 December 1970	Coventry City	A	0–1	23,775	
22	12 December 1970	Burnley	H	0–0	13,299	
23	19 December 1970	Derby County	H	1–0	21,906	Burrows 60'
24	26 December 1970	Liverpool	A	0–0	47,103	
25	9 January 1971	Newcastle United	A	2–0	25,680	Greenhoff 1', Burrows 62'
26	16 January 1971	West Bromwich Albion	H	2–0	20,882	Conroy 23', 78'
27	30 January 1971	Southampton	A	1–2	19,500	Greenhoff 20'
28	6 February 1971	Coventry City	H	2–1	17,208	Mortimer (o.g.) 45', Greenhoff 50'
29	20 February 1971	Chelsea	H	1–2	26,592	Conroy 47'
30	23 February 1971	Burnley	A	1–1	12,209	Conroy 12'
31	27 February 1971	Huddersfield Town	A	1–0	15,626	Conroy 78' (pen)
32	13 March 1971	Everton	A	0–2	38,924	
33	20 March 1971	Manchester United	H	1–2	39,889	Ritchie 77'
34	3 April 1971	Crystal Palace	A	2–3	16,963	Ritchie (2) 81', 90'
35	7 April 1971	Wolverhampton Wanderers	H	1–0	22,808	Burrows 61' (pen)
36	10 April 1971	Liverpool	H	0–1	28,810	
37	13 April 1971	Blackpool	H	1–1	13,916	Jump 16'
38	17 April 1971	West Ham United	A	0–1	26,269	
39	24 April 1971	Manchester City	H	2–0	13,358	Bernard 20', Ritchie 52'
40	27 April 1971	Nottingham Forest	A	0–0	13,502	
41	1 May 1971	Arsenal	A	0–1	55,011	
42	5 May 1971	Tottenham Hotspur	H	0–1	14,019	

=== FA Cup ===
Round	Date	Opponent	Venue	Result	Attendance	Scorers
R3	2 January 1971	Millwall	H	2–1	21,398	Ritchie 31', Greenhoff 77'
R4	23 January 1971	Huddersfield Town	H	3–3	34,231	Greenhoff 3', Burrows 65', Conroy 75'
R4 Replay	26 January 1971	Huddersfield Town	A	0–0 (aet)	40,231	
R4 2nd Replay	8 February 1971	Huddersfield Town	N	1–0	39,302	Greenhoff 68'
R5	13 February 1971	Ipswich Town	H	0–0	36,809	
R5 Replay	16 February 1971	Ipswich Town	A	1–0	30,232	Smith 74'
Quarter-final	6 March 1971	Hull City	A	3–2	41,452	Conroy 45', Ritchie (2) 70', 81'
Semi-final	27 March 1971	Arsenal	N	2–2	54,770	Smith 22', Ritchie 31'
Semi-final Replay	31 March 1971	Arsenal	N	0–2	62,356	
3rd Place play-off	7 May 1971	Everton	N	3–2	5,031	Bernard 27', Ritchie (2) 47' 80'

=== League Cup ===
Round	Date	Opponent	Venue	Result	Attendance	Scorers
R2	9 September 1970	Millwall	H	0–0	10,230	
R2 Replay	16 September 1970	Millwall	A	1–2	12,789	Conroy 57'

=== Texaco Cup ===
Round	Date	Opponent	Venue	Result	Attendance	Scorers
R1 1st Leg	14 September 1970	Motherwell	A	0–1	14,450	
R1 2nd Leg	30 September 1970	Motherwell	H	2–1 (3–4 pens)	15,779	Bloor, Burrows

=== Anglo-Italian Cup ===
Round	Date	Opponent	Venue	Result	Attendance	Scorers
Group match 1	26 May 1971	Roma	H	2–2	11,520	Greenhoff 13', Smith 58'
Group match 2	29 May 1971	Hellas Verona	H	2–0	10,252	Ritchie 53', Jump 78'
Group match 3	1 June 1971	Roma	A	1–0	37,450	Ritchie 56'
Group match 4	4 June 1971	Hellas Verona	A	1–2	8,000	Ritchie 88'

=== Friendlies ===
Match	Opponent	Venue	Result
1	Ards	A	1–0
2	Portadown	A	5–0
3	Glentoran	A	1–1
4	Finn Harps	A	3–0
5	Crewe Alexandra	A	3–1
6	Shrewsbury Town	A	2–2
7	East Fife	A	1–0
8	Marseille	A	1–2
9	RCD Mallorca	A	0–3

== Squad statistics ==
Pos.	Name	League		FA Cup		League Cup		Texaco Cup		Anglo-Italian Cup		Total	
Pos.	Name	Apps	Goals	Apps	Goals	Apps	Goals	Apps	Goals	Apps	Goals	Apps	Goals
GK	(England) Gordon Banks	39	0	10	0	1	0	1	0	4	0	55	0
GK	(England) John Farmer	3	0	0	0	1	0	1	0	0(1)	0	5(1)	0
DF	(England) Alan Bloor	36	1	8	0	2	0	2	1	4	0	52	2
DF	(Northern Ireland) Alex Elder	3(2)	0	0(3)	0	0	0	0	0	1	0	4(5)	0
DF	(England) Jackie Marsh	34(2)	0	8	0	2	0	1	0	4	0	49(2)	0
DF	(England) Mike Pejic	42	0	10	0	2	0	2	0	4	0	60	0
DF	(England) Eric Skeels	27(2)	0	9(1)	0	1	0	1(1)	0	4	0	42(4)	0
DF	(England) Denis Smith	36	0	8	2	2	0	2	0	4	1	52	3
MF	(England) Mike Bernard	40	2	10	1	1	0	2	0	2	0	55	3
MF	(Republic of Ireland) Terry Conroy	34	11	9	2	2	1	2	0	0	0	47	14
MF	(England) George Eastham	16(3)	0	6	0	2	0	0(1)	0	0	0	24(4)	0
MF	(England) Sean Haslegrave	15	0	7	0	0	0	0	0	4	0	26	0
MF	(England) Stewart Jump	10(1)	1	0(1)	0	0	0	0	0	2	1	12(2)	2
MF	(England) Terry Lees	4(3)	0	1(1)	0	0	0	0	0	0	0	5(4)	0
MF	(Wales) John Mahoney	15(3)	0	3(1)	0	0	0	0	0	4	0	22(4)	0
MF	(Scotland) Willie Stevenson	3(2)	0	0	0	1	0	0	0	0	0	4(2)	0
FW	(England) Harry Burrows	33(1)	5	8	1	0(1)	0	2	1	0	0	43(2)	7
FW	(England) Peter Dobing	11	2	0	0	2	0	2	0	0	0	15	2
FW	(England) Jimmy Greenhoff	33	7	8	3	2	0	2	0	3	1	48	11
FW	(England) John Ritchie	26(1)	13	5	6	1(1)	0	2	0	4	3	38(2)	22
FW	(England) Terry Smith	2(1)	1	0	0	0	0	0	0	0	0	2(1)	1
–	Own goals	–	1	–	0	–	0	–	0	–	0	–	1
