= Bob Hulse =

English footballer

Personal information
- Full name: Robert Arthur Hulse
- Date of birth: 5 November 1948 (age 77)
- Place of birth: Crewe, England
- Position: Forward

Senior career*
Years	Team	Apps	(Gls)
- Northwich Victoria
1967–1968	Stoke City	2	(0)
- * Club domestic league appearances and goals

Robert Arthur Hulse (born 5 November 1948) is an English former professional footballer who played in the Football League for Stoke City.

== Career ==
Hulse was born in Crewe and played for Northwich Victoria before been given a professional contract with Stoke City for the 1967–68 season. He played in just two matches for Stoke one at the start of the season and one near the end before being released.

== Career statistics ==
Club	Season	League			FA Cup		League Cup		Total	
Club	Season	Division	Apps	Goals	Apps	Goals	Apps	Goals	Apps	Goals
Stoke City	1967–68	First Division	2	0	0	0	0	0	2	0
Career Total			2	0	0	0	0	0	2	0
