= Micky Bloor =

Welsh-born English footballer

Personal information
- Full name: Michael Bennett Bloor
- Date of birth: 25 March 1949 (age 77)
- Place of birth: Wrexham, Wales
- Position: Full back

Senior career*
| Years | Team | Apps | (Gls) |
| – | Newport (Shropshire) | | |
| 1967–1971 | Stoke City | 0 | (0) |
| 1971–1973 | Lincoln City | 73 | (0) |
| 1973–1964 | Darlington | 7 | (0) |
| – | Whitby Town | | |
- * Club domestic league appearances and goals

Michael Bennett Bloor (born 25 March 1949) is a Welsh former footballer who made 80 appearances in the Football League playing as a full back for Lincoln City and Darlington. He began his professional career with Stoke City, but never represented them in the league, and went on to play non-league football for Whitby Town.

== Career statistics ==
Appearances and goals by club, season and competition
| Club | Season | League | | | FA Cup | | League Cup | | Total | |
| Club | Season | Division | Apps | Goals | Apps | Goals | Apps | Goals | Apps | Goals |
|---|---|---|---|---|---|---|---|---|---|---|
| Stoke City | 1967–68 | First Division | 0 | 0 | 0 | 0 | 0 | 0 | 0 | 0 |
| Lincoln City | 1971–72 | Fourth Division | 40 | 0 | 1 | 0 | 4 | 0 | 45 | 0 |
| Lincoln City | 1972–73 | Fourth Division | 33 | 0 | 2 | 0 | 0 | 0 | 35 | 0 |
| Lincoln City | Total | | 73 | 0 | 3 | 0 | 4 | 0 | 80 | 0 |
| Darlington | 1973–74 | Fourth Division | 7 | 0 | 0 | 0 | 1 | 0 | 8 | 0 |
| Career total | | | 80 | 0 | 3 | 0 | 5 | 0 | 88 | 0 |
