= 1967–68 Stoke City F.C. season =

Stoke City
1967–68 season
- Chairman: Albert Henshall
- Manager: Tony Waddington
- Stadium: Victoria Ground
- Football League First Division: 18th (35 points)
- FA Cup: Fourth round
- League Cup: Quarter-final
- Top goalscorer: League: Peter Dobing & Harry Burrows (15); All: Harry Burrows (16)
- Highest home attendance: 32,549 vs Manchester United (30 March 1967)
- Lowest home attendance: 15,785 vs Sheffield Wednesday (16 March 1968)
- Average home league attendance: 21,949
Home colours

The 1967–68 season was Stoke City's 61st season in the Football League and the 37th in the First Division.

Since gaining promotion back to the First Division in 1963, Stoke had done well and managed to consistently finish in mid-table avoiding any fears of relegation. However, in 1967–68 Stoke did have a later than expected fight against relegation and after going seven straight matches without a win towards the end of the season it looked as if Stoke were heading back to the Second Division but a thrilling 3–2 win over Leeds set Stoke up to beat Liverpool on the final day ensuring survival by three points.

== Season review ==
=== League ===
Dennis Viollet left Stoke in May 1967 for Baltimore Bays in the United States, and Tony Waddington decided against signing a replacement, making just one transaction prior to the start of the 1967–68 season, purchasing Burnley left back Alex Elder for £50,000. Elder had a fine career at Turf Moor but at Stoke after an early injury he never produced the form expected of him and is considered to be one of Waddington's worst signings. After a decent enough start to the campaign by Christmas results did not go well at all and the side slipped down the table and into the relegation places. Results continued to be poor and after a 3–0 defeat away at West Bromwich Albion on 13 March, Stoke went and lost the next six matches.

Consequently, a lot of 'wheeling a dealing' was done in the transfer market with Alan Philpott leaving for Oldham, Maurice Setters to Coventry and the popular Calvin Palmer moving to Sunderland for £70,000. To fill the gap Waddington brought in Willie Stevenson from Liverpool for £30,000. Thanks to three fine results late on in the season, including a thrilling 3–2 win over Don Revie's Leeds and a decisive 2–1 victory over Liverpool, Stoke managed to finish in 18th place three points away from the relegation places.

=== FA Cup ===
After beating Welsh side Cardiff City in the third round Stoke were knocked out by West Ham United who won 3–0 at the Victoria Ground.

=== League Cup ===
Stoke made it through to the quarter-final of the 1967–68 League Cup losing 2–0 to Leeds United at Elland Road after knocking out Watford, Ipswich Town and Sheffield Wednesday.

== Final league table ==
Pos	Team	Pld	W	D	L	GF	GA	GAv	Pts
16	Southampton	42	13	11	18	66	83	0.795	37
17	Wolverhampton Wanderers	42	14	8	20	66	75	0.880	36
18	Stoke City	42	14	7	21	50	73	0.685	35
19	Sheffield Wednesday	42	11	12	19	51	63	0.810	34
20	Coventry City	42	9	15	18	51	71	0.718	33

Source: World Football
Rules for classification: 1) Points; 2) Goal average; 3) Goals scored

== Results ==
Stoke's score comes first

=== Legend ===
Win	Draw	Loss

=== Football League First Division ===
Match	Date	Opponent	Venue	Result	Attendance	Scorers
1	19 August 1967	Arsenal	A	0–2	27,048	
2	23 August 1967	Sheffield United	H	1–1	20,823	Bloor
3	26 August 1967	Manchester City	H	3–0	22,456	Bloor, Palmer, Burrows (pen)
4	29 August 1967	Sheffield United	A	0–1	17,099	
5	2 September 1967	Newcastle United	A	1–1	38,470	Mahoney
6	6 September 1967	Leicester City	H	3–2	19,032	Palmer, Burrows (pen), Conroy
7	9 September 1967	West Bromwich Albion	H	0–0	21,036	
8	16 September 1967	Chelsea	A	2–2	26,614	Dobing, Burrows (pen)
9	23 September 1967	Southampton	H	3–2	18,618	Burrows (2) (1 pen), Vernon
10	30 September 1967	Liverpool	A	1–2	50,120	Dobing
11	7 October 1967	West Ham United	A	4–3	24,471	Dobing (2), Burrows (2)
12	14 October 1967	Burnley	H	0–2	19,532	
13	23 October 1967	Sheffield Wednesday	A	1–1	33,002	Burrows
14	28 October 1967	Tottenham Hotspur	H	2–1	26,341	Burrows (2)
15	4 November 1967	Manchester United	A	0–1	51,041	
16	11 November 1967	Sunderland	H	2–1	19,554	Dobing, Bloor
17	18 November 1967	Wolverhampton Wanderers	A	4–3	34,544	Bloor, Mahoney, Burrows, Palmer
18	25 November 1967	Fulham	H	0–1	18,344	
19	2 December 1967	Leeds United	A	0–2	29,958	
20	9 December 1967	Everton	H	1–0	17,154	Dobing
21	16 December 1967	Arsenal	H	0–1	16,110	
22	23 December 1967	Manchester City	A	2–4	40,121	Dobing, Burrows
23	26 December 1967	Nottingham Forest	A	0–3	37,577	
24	30 December 1967	Nottingham Forest	H	1–3	20,948	Mahoney
25	6 January 1968	Newcastle United	H	2–1	17,623	Burrows (2)
26	20 January 1968	Chelsea	H	0–1	21,751	
27	3 February 1968	Southampton	A	2–1	20,880	Burrows, Palmer
28	26 February 1968	West Ham United	H	2–0	16,092	Dobing, Mahoney
29	13 March 1968	West Bromwich Albion	A	0–3	20,500	
30	16 March 1968	Sheffield Wednesday	H	0–1	15,785	
31	23 March 1968	Tottenham Hotspur	A	0–3	29,530	
32	30 March 1968	Manchester United	H	2–4	32,549	Eastham, Dobing
33	6 April 1968	Sunderland	A	1–3	27,813	Harris (o.g.)
34	13 April 1968	Wolverhampton Wanderers	H	0–2	26,290	
35	15 April 1968	Coventry City	A	0–2	31,380	
36	16 April 1968	Coventry City	H	3–3	20,170	Bentley, Dobing, Mahoney
37	20 April 1968	Burnley	A	0–4	13,188	
38	23 April 1968	Leeds United	H	3–2	24,518	Dobing (3)
39	1 May 1968	Fulham	A	2–0	12,523	Dobing, Vernon
40	4 May 1968	Everton	A	0–3	43,302	
41	11 May 1968	Leicester City	A	0–0	23,852	
42	15 May 1968	Liverpool	H	2–1	27,693	Dobing, Mahoney

=== FA Cup ===
Round	Date	Opponent	Venue	Result	Attendance	Scorers
R3	27 January 1968	Cardiff City	H	2–1	23,563	Stevenson, Vernon
R4	17 February 1968	West Ham United	H	0–3	36,704	

=== League Cup ===
Round	Date	Opponent	Venue	Result	Attendance	Scorers
R2	13 September 1967	Watford	H	2–0	10,126	Allen, Palmer
R3	11 October 1967	Ipswich Town	H	2–1	14,815	Burrows, Bridgwood
R4	1 November 1967	Sheffield Wednesday	A	0–0	26,001	
R4 Replay	15 November 1967	Sheffield Wednesday	H	2–1	21,185	Bentley, Palmer
Quarter-final	13 December 1967	Leeds United	A	0–2	24,558	

=== Friendlies ===
Match	Opponent	Venue	Result
1	Stockport County	A	2–2
2	Asante Kotoko	H	1–3
3	Portsmouth	A	1–2

== Squad statistics ==
Pos.	Name	League		FA Cup		League Cup		Total	
Pos.	Name	Apps	Goals	Apps	Goals	Apps	Goals	Apps	Goals
GK	(England) Gordon Banks	39	0	2	0	4	0	45	0
GK	(England) John Farmer	2	0	0	0	0	0	2	0
GK	(England) Paul Shardlow	1	0	0	0	1	0	2	0
DF	(England) Tony Allen	38	0	2	0	5	1	45	1
DF	(England) Bill Bentley	30(2)	1	1	0	4	1	35(2)	2
DF	(England) Alan Bloor	37	4	2	0	4	0	43	4
DF	(Wales) Micky Bloor	0	0	0	0	0	0	0	0
DF	(Northern Ireland) Alex Elder	24	0	2	0	3	0	29	0
DF	(England) Tony Lacey	0(1)	0	0	0	0	0	0(1)	0
DF	(England) Jackie Marsh	2(2)	0	0	0	1	0	3(2)	0
DF	(England) John Moore	12(1)	0	0	0	0	0	12(1)	0
DF	(England) Calvin Palmer	23	4	2	0	5	2	30	6
DF	(England) Eric Skeels	34	0	2	0	4	0	40	0
MF	(England) Mike Bernard	11(6)	0	0	0	2	0	13(6)	0
MF	(England) Gerry Bridgwood	14(1)	0	0	0	1	1	15(1)	1
MF	(Republic of Ireland) Terry Conroy	8(1)	1	0	0	2	0	10(1)	1
MF	(England) George Eastham	38(1)	1	0(1)	0	5	0	43(2)	1
MF	(Wales) John Mahoney	27(1)	6	2	0	2	0	31(1)	6
MF	(England) Geoff Nulty	0	0	0	0	0	0	0	0
MF	(England) Alan Philpott	1	0	0	0	0(1)	0	1(1)	0
MF	(England) Maurice Setters	3	0	0	0	0	0	3	0
MF	(Scotland) Willie Stevenson	18	0	2	1	0	0	20	1
FW	(England) Harry Burrows	42	15	2	0	5	1	49	16
FW	(England) Peter Dobing	37	15	1	0	5	0	43	15
FW	(England) Bob Hulse	2	0	0	0	0	0	2	0
FW	(Wales) Roy Vernon	19	2	2	1	2	0	23	3
–	Own goals	–	1	–	0	–	0	–	1
