= 1971–72 Stoke City F.C. season =

Stoke City
1971–72 season
- Chairman: Albert Henshall
- Manager: Tony Waddington
- Stadium: Victoria Ground
- Football League First Division: 17th (35 points)
- FA Cup: Semi-final
- League Cup: Winners
- Texaco Cup: Second round
- Anglo-Italian Cup: Group Stage
- Top goalscorer: League: John Ritchie (12); All: John Ritchie (21)
- Highest home attendance: 43,007 vs Manchester City (27 December 1971)
- Lowest home attendance: 13,920 vs Nottingham Forest (10 April 1972)
- Average home league attendance: 24,204
Home colours

The 1971–72 season was Stoke City's 65th season in the Football League and the 41st in the First Division.

After 109 years of trying Stoke City finally won their first major trophy in March 1972 beating Chelsea 2–1 in the League Cup final at Wembley. They also reached the semi-final of the FA Cup for the second season running and again lost out to Arsenal. Their league campaign obviously took a hit with all the cup matches being played, Stoke finished in 17th position with 35 points. In total Stoke played 71 matches during a very busy season.

== Season review ==
=== League ===
The Stoke fans were confident of seeing more good exciting attacking football again as the 1971–72 season commenced but overall league performances were bitterly disappointing, however in the cup competitions Stoke did themselves proud. With the cup matches obviously taking priority Stoke had a back-log of fixtures to play (six games in 17 days) and they failed to win any of them as they finished in 17th position with 35 points.

=== FA Cup ===
Stoke had another run to the semi-final of the FA Cup after beating lower league sides, Chesterfield, Tranmere Rovers, Hull City and another two matches against Manchester United, Stoke faced Arsenal again. Villa Park hosted the tie and thanks to an own goal from Peter Simpson, Stoke scraped a 1–1 draw in a close match. The replay at Goodison Park was controversial. Stoke took an early lead through a penalty, but the "Gunners" won a controversial penalty of their own for a handball after a corner that was given despite Gordon Banks appearing to have been fouled beforehand. Arsenal converted the penalty. The "Gunners" then started controlling the match and scored a second goal, which nevertheless looked suspiciously offside, and that was how the match ended, as Stoke went down 2–1 and their hopes of achieving a Wembley double disappeared.

=== League Cup ===
In the League Cup Stoke ousted Southport and Oxford United and then in the fourth round Stoke visited Old Trafford and held Manchester United to a 1–1 draw with John Ritchie cancelling out a goal from Alan Gowling. The replay attracted almost 41,000 fans to the Victoria Ground but this time there was no goals and third game was required. This was again staged at Stoke and two late goals sealed a 2–1 victory and passage to the last eight. At this stage of the season matches were coming thick and fast and a 4–2 win over Bristol Rovers saw Stoke enter the semi-finals of the League Cup where they met West Ham United over two legs.

Not only was this to be a memorable cup tie for Stoke, the encounter has also been described as "epic". In the 1st leg Stoke's hopes of reaching the final seemed to have disappeared when they lost 2–1 to home. However at West Ham, Ritchie levelled the aggregated score with 20 minutes left, and with just three of those remaining West Ham were awarded a penalty, a decision which angered Gordon Banks immensely. The England 'keeper was so psyched up that he dived and saved Geoff Hurst's spot kick superbly, Banks says that it was his most significant save of his career. And so to a third match, a replay at Hillsborough, was a tense 0–0 draw. The fourth meeting was staged at Old Trafford and another bumper crowd turned out to see the two sides do battle in a match that seemed to have everything. Bobby Ferguson, the "Hammers" goalkeeper was accidentally kicked on the head by Terry Conroy and Bobby Moore went in goal. He saved a Mike Bernard penalty but was beaten on the rebound. Ferguson returned and the game ebbed and flowed, and either side could have won. In the end it was Stoke with Conroy scoring the winning goal to send City through to their first major final.

The final took place on 4 March 1972 at Wembley against Chelsea in front of a crowd 97,852. Stoke showed no big match nerves and took an early lead through Terry Conroy, this prompted a response by Chelsea and just before the interval a rare mistake from Alan Bloor allowed Peter Osgood to level the scores. Stoke were not to be denied and on 73 minutes the veteran George Eastham scored the winning goal to earn Stoke their first major trophy.

== Final league table ==
Pos	Team	Pld	W	D	L	GF	GA	GAv	Pts	Qualification or relegation
15	Everton	42	9	18	15	37	48	0.771	36	
16	West Bromwich Albion	42	12	11	19	42	54	0.778	35	
17	Stoke City	42	10	15	17	39	56	0.696	35	Qualification for the UEFA Cup first round
18	Coventry City	42	9	15	18	44	67	0.657	33	
19	Southampton	42	12	7	23	52	80	0.650	31	

Source: World Football
Rules for classification: 1) Points; 2) Goal average; 3) Goals scored

== Results ==
Stoke's score comes first

=== Legend ===
Win	Draw	Loss

=== Football League First Division ===
Match	Date	Opponent	Venue	Result	Attendance	Scorers
1	14 August 1971	Coventry City	A	1–1	20,739	Ritchie 46'
2	17 August 1971	Southampton	A	1–3	18,382	Greenhoff 82'
3	21 August 1971	Crystal Palace	H	3–1	18,756	Ritchie 20' (pen), Mahoney 44', Greenhoff 52'
4	25 August 1971	Leicester City	H	3–1	21,678	Ritchie 64', Bernard 78', Dobing 80'
5	28 August 1971	Arsenal	A	1–0	36,637	Ritchie 20'
6	31 August 1971	Nottingham Forest	A	0–0	19,017	
7	4 September 1971	Wolverhampton Wanderers	H	0–1	20,021	
8	11 September 1971	Derby County	A	0–4	32,548	
9	18 September 1971	Huddersfield Town	H	1–0	16,463	Conroy 25'
10	25 September 1971	West Ham United	A	1–2	19,193	Ritchie 58'
11	2 October 1971	Liverpool	H	0–0	29,698	
12	9 October 1971	Sheffield United	A	3–2	35,371	Ritchie 15', Smith 51', Conroy 81'
13	16 October 1971	Coventry City	H	1–0	20,040	Smith 82'
14	23 October 1971	Ipswich Town	A	1–2	17,678	Bernard 33'
15	30 October 1971	Tottenham Hotspur	H	2–0	28,348	Mahoney (2) 49', 55'
16	6 November 1971	West Bromwich Albion	A	1–0	19,207	Greenhoff 42' (pen)
17	13 November 1971	Chelsea	H	0–1	22,196	
18	20 November 1971	Leeds United	A	0–1	33,012	
19	27 November 1971	Newcastle United	H	3–3	16,815	Ritchie 22', Conroy (2) 65', 70'
20	4 December 1971	Everton	A	0–0	35,469	
21	11 December 1971	Manchester United	H	1–1	33,807	Mahoney 27'
22	13 December 1971	Wolverhampton Wanderers	A	0–2	25,619	
23	27 December 1971	Manchester City	H	1–3	43,007	Smith 90'
24	4 January 1972	Huddersfield Town	A	0–0	12,665	
25	8 January 1972	Arsenal	H	0–0	18,965	
26	22 January 1972	Southampton	H	3–1	17,480	Ritchie 12', Greenhoff (2) 51', 82'
27	29 January 1972	Leicester City	A	1–2	26,931	Greenhoff 13'
28	12 February 1972	Ipswich Town	H	3–3	20,247	Ritchie 55', Greenhoff 75', Smith 87'
29	19 February 1972	Tottenham Hotspur	A	0–2	32,841	
30	11 March 1972	Sheffield United	H	2–2	31,667	Smith 65', Ritchie 85'
31	25 March 1972	Derby County	H	1–1	33,592	Greenhoff 48' (pen)
32	28 March 1972	Liverpool	A	1–2	42,489	Ritchie 35'
33	1 April 1972	Manchester City	A	2–1	49,392	Doyle 35 (o.g.), Ritchie 53'
34	4 April 1972	West Ham United	H	0–0	24,688	
35	8 April 1972	Leeds United	H	0–3	35,123	
35	10 April 1972	Nottingham Forest	H	0–2	13,920	
37	22 April 1972	Everton	H	1–1	16,796	Lyons 30' (o.g.)
38	24 April 1972	Chelsea	A	0–2	23,443	
39	26 April 1972	Crystal Palace	A	0–2	24,550	
40	29 April 1972	Manchester United	A	0–3	34,959	
41	5 May 1972	West Bromwich Albion	H	1–1	16,206	Burrows 68'
42	8 May 1972	Newcastle United	A	0–0	21,350	

=== FA Cup ===
Round	Date	Opponent	Venue	Result	Attendance	Scorers
R3	15 January 1972	Chesterfield	H	2–1	26,559	Conroy 15', Dobing 67'
R4	5 February 1972	Tranmere Rovers	A	2–2	24,424	Conroy 68', Ritchie 75'
R4 Replay	9 February 1972	Tranmere Rovers	H	2–0	35,352	Bernard 31', Greenhoff 70'
R5	26 February 1972	Hull City	H	4–1	34,558	Greenhoff (2) 44', 45', Conroy 79', Ritchie 87'
Quarter-final	18 March 1972	Manchester United	A	1–1	53,558	Greenhoff 58'
Quarter-final Replay	22 March 1972	Manchester United	H	2–1 (aet)	49,091	Smith 74', Conroy 102'
Semi-final	15 April 1972	Arsenal	N	1–1	56,570	Simpson 65' (o.g.)
Semi-final Replay	19 April 1972	Arsenal	N	1–2	35,976	Greenhoff 19'
3rd Place play-off	5 August 1972	Birmingham City	A	0–0 (3–4 pens)	23,841	

=== League Cup ===
Round	Date	Opponent	Venue	Result	Attendance	Scorers
R2	8 September 1971	Southport	A	2–1	10,225	Smith 10', Greenhoff 70'
R3	6 October 1971	Oxford United	A	1–1	15,024	Greenhoff 13'
R3 Replay	18 October 1971	Oxford United	H	2–0	11,757	Ritchie 30', Haslegrave 86'
R4	27 October 1971	Manchester United	A	1–1	47,062	Ritchie 72'
R4 Replay	8 November 1971	Manchester United	H	0–0 (aet)	40,829	
R4 2nd Replay	15 November 1971	Manchester United	H	2–1	42,233	Dobing 70', Ritchie 88'
Quarter-final	23 November 1971	Bristol Rovers	A	4–2	33,626	Greenhoff 7', Smith 20', Bernard 61', Conroy 64'
Semi-final 1st Leg	8 December 1971	West Ham United	H	1–2	36,407	Dobing 14'
Semi-final 2nd Leg	15 December 1971	West Ham United	A	1–0	38,771	Ritchie 72'
Semi-final Replay	5 January 1972	West Ham United	N	0–0	46,916	
Semi-final 2nd Replay	26 January 1972	West Ham United	N	3–2	49,247	Bernard 32', Dobing 45', Conroy 49'
Final	4 March 1972	Chelsea	N	2–1	97,852	Conroy 5', Eastham 73'

=== Texaco Cup ===
Round	Date	Opponent	Venue	Result	Attendance	Scorers
R1 1st Leg	15 September 1971	Motherwell	A	1–0	8,213	Bernard
R1 2nd Leg	29 September 1971	Motherwell	H	4–1	12,072	Ritchie (2), Greenhoff, Haslegrave
R2 1st Leg	20 October 1971	Derby County	A	2–3	21,487	Mahoney, Smith
R2 2nd Leg	11 November 1971	Derby County	H	1–1	23,461	Smith

=== Anglo-Italian Cup ===
Round	Date	Opponent	Venue	Result	Attendance	Scorers
Group stage	1 June 1972	Catanzaro	A	3–0	14,147	Greenhoff 60', Dobing 66', Marsh 75'
Group stage	5 June 1972	Roma	A	0–2	19,960	
Group stage	7 June 1972	Catanzaro	H	2–0	8,345	Ritchie 43', Greenhoff 90'
Group stage	10 June 1972	Roma	H	1–2	5,446	Ritchie 46'

=== Friendlies ===
Match	Opponent	Venue	Result
1	Porthmadog	A	5–2
2	Motherwell	A	0–0
3	Southend United	A	4–2
4	Olympiacos	A	2–1
5	Olympiacos	A	0–1

== Squad statistics ==
Pos.	Name	League		FA Cup		League Cup		Texaco Cup		Anglo-Italian Cup		Total	
Pos.	Name	Apps	Goals	Apps	Goals	Apps	Goals	Apps	Goals	Apps	Goals	Apps	Goals
GK	(England) Gordon Banks	36	0	8	0	11	0	4	0	0	0	59	0
GK	(England) John Farmer	6	0	1	0	1	0	0	0	4	0	12	0
DF	(England) Alan Bloor	35	0	9	0	11	0	4	0	4	0	63	0
DF	(Northern Ireland) Alex Elder	6	0	2	0	0	0	0	0	3	0	11	0
DF	(England) Jackie Marsh	41	0	8	0	12	0	4	0	4	1	69	1
DF	(England) Mike Pejic	32	0	4	0	12	0	3	0	1	0	52	0
DF	(England) Denis Smith	28	5	9	1	9	2	4	2	4	0	54	10
DF	(England) Eric Skeels	13(6)	0	5	0	1(1)	0	0	0	0(1)	0	19(8)	0
MF	(England) Mike Bernard	36	2	8	1	12	2	4	1	0	0	60	6
MF	(Republic of Ireland) Terry Conroy	27	4	6	4	11	3	2	0	0	0	46	11
MF	(England) George Eastham	13(1)	0	8	0	6(2)	1	1	0	0	0	28(3)	1
MF	(England) Sean Haslegrave	17(1)	0	0	0	2(1)	1	3	1	0	0	22(2)	2
MF	(England) George Jackson	8	0	0	0	0	0	0(1)	0	1(2)	0	9(3)	0
MF	(England) Stewart Jump	17(2)	0	2	0	5	0	3	0	4	0	31(2)	0
MF	(England) Terry Lees	3(2)	0	0	0	0	0	0	0	0(1)	0	3(3)	0
MF	(Wales) John Mahoney	25(4)	4	2	0	4(2)	0	3	1	0	0	34(6)	5
MF	(Scotland) Jimmy Robertson	0	0	1	0	0	0	0	0	0	0	1	0
MF	(Scotland) Willie Stevenson	12(5)	0	0	0	1	0	3(1)	0	4	0	20(6)	0
FW	(England) Harry Burrows	10	1	0(2)	0	0	0	0	0	4	0	14(2)	1
FW	(England) Peter Dobing	27(1)	1	9	1	10	3	1(1)	0	4	1	51(2)	6
FW	(England) Jimmy Greenhoff	35	8	7	5	12	3	2	1	3	2	59	19
FW	(England) Geoff Hurst	0	0	1	0	0	0	0	0	0	0	1	0
FW	(England) John Ritchie	32	12	9	2	12	4	3	2	4	2	60	22
FW	(England) Terry Smith	1	0	0	0	0	0	0	0	0	0	1	0
FW	(England) Tommy Walker	2	0	0	0	0	0	0	0	0	0	2	0
–	Own goals	–	2	–	1	–	0	–	0	–	0	–	3
