= Tommy Walker (footballer, born February 1952) =

English footballer

Personal information
- Full name: Thomas Jackson Walker
- Date of birth: 20 February 1952 (age 74)
- Place of birth: Newcastle-under-Lyme, England
- Position: Midfielder

Senior career*
Years	Team	Apps	(Gls)
1969–1972	Stoke City	2	(0)
1973	Burnley	0	(0)
1973	Yeovil Town	9	(4)
1973–1974	Macclesfield Town	2	(0)
- * Club domestic league appearances and goals

Thomas Jackson Walker (born 20 February 1952) is an English former footballer who played as a midfielder for Stoke City.

== Career ==
Walker was born in Newcastle-under-Lyme and began his career with local side Stoke City. Due to Stoke having a large number of fixtures in the 1971–72 season he made two appearances for Stoke in April 1972, away at Chelsea and Manchester United. He left Stoke at the end of the 1972–73 season for Burnley but failed to make an appearance and later played for non-league Yeovil Town.

== Career statistics ==
Appearances and goals by club, season and competition
Club	Season	League			FA Cup		League Cup		Total	
Club	Season	Division	Apps	Goals	Apps	Goals	Apps	Goals	Apps	Goals
Stoke City	1971–72	First Division	2	0	0	0	0	0	2	0
Burnley	1973-74	First Division	0	0	0	0	0	0	0	0
Yeovil Town	1973–74	Southern Premier League	9	4	0	0	0	0	9	4
Macclesfield Town	1973–74	Northern Premier League	2	0	0	0	0	0	2	0
Career total			13	4	0	0	0	0	13	4
