= George Jackson (footballer, born 1952) =

English footballer

Personal information
- Full name: George Jackson
- Date of birth: 10 February 1952 (age 74)
- Place of birth: Manchester, England
- Position: Midfielder

Senior career*
Years	Team	Apps	(Gls)
1971–1972	Stoke City	8	(0)
- * Club domestic league appearances and goals

George Jackson (born 10 February 1952) is an English former footballer who played in the Football League for Stoke City.

== Career ==
Jackson was born in Manchester and joined Stoke City as a teenager in 1970. He made twelve appearances for Stoke in the 1971–72 season before suffering a career-ending injury and later became a youth coach at the Victoria Ground.

== Career statistics ==
Appearances and goals by club, season and competition
Club	Season	League			FA Cup		League Cup		Other		Total	
Club	Season	Division	Apps	Goals	Apps	Goals	Apps	Goals	Apps	Goals	Apps	Goals
Stoke City	1971–72	First Division	8	0	0	0	0	0	4 (Note: Three appearances in Anglo-Italian Cup and one in Texaco Cup)	0	12	0
Career total			8	0	0	0	0	0	4	0	12	0
