= George Jackson (plasterwork) =

British plasterwork manufacturer (1766–1840)

George Jackson (1766–1840) was a British plasterwork innovator, active from 1780 onwards. He was commissioned by architect Robert Adam to produce reverse-cut boxwood moulds (many to Adam designs). Jackson formed a company which still produces composition pressings and retains a boxwood mould collection.

In 1780 Jackson founded George Jackson & Sons Ltd. in London which was active in decorative plaster ornaments and introduced the use of composition plaster into England.
