= Kevin Lewis (footballer, born 1970) =

English footballer

Personal information
- Full name: Kevin Lewis
- Date of birth: 17 October 1970 (age 56)
- Place of birth: Kingston upon Hull, England
- Position: Defender

Senior career*
Years	Team	Apps	(Gls)
1987–1988	Stoke City	1	(0)
1989–1990	Mansfield Town	0	(0)
–	Stafford Rangers		
- * Club domestic league appearances and goals

Kevin Lewis (born 17 October 1970) is an English former footballer who played in the Football League for Stoke City. His uncle of the same name, was also a footballer who played for Stoke City.

== Career ==
Lewis was born in Kingston upon Hull and played in the youth team of Stoke City. With Stoke's 1987–88 campaign coming to a close with nothing to play for manager Mick Mills decided to give youth team players some first team experience and Lewis made his a substitute in a 2–0 defeat away at Millwall on 30 April 1988. He never made it as a professional footballer and left for non-league Stafford Rangers after an unsuccessful spell at Mansfield Town.

== Career statistics ==
Appearances and goals by club, season and competition
Club	Season	League		FA Cup		League Cup		Total	
Club	Season	Apps	Goals	Apps	Goals	Apps	Goals	Apps	Goals
Stoke City	1987–88	1	0	0	0	0	0	1	0
Career Total		1	0	0	0	0	0	1	0
