= Kevin Lewis (footballer, born 1952) =

English footballer

Personal information
- Full name: Kevin William Lewis
- Date of birth: 25 September 1952 (age 74)
- Place of birth: Hull, England
- Position: Defender

Youth career
- 1970–1972: Manchester United

Senior career*
Years	Team	Apps	(Gls)
1972–1976	Stoke City	15	(0)
1977–1982	Crewe Alexandra	122	(2)
1982	Telford United		
Total		137	(2)

Managerial career
- 1985–1986: Leek Town
- * Club domestic league appearances and goals

Kevin William Lewis (born 25 September 1952) was an English footballer who played in the Football League for Crewe Alexandra and Stoke City. His nephew of the same name was also a footballer who played for Stoke City.

== Career ==
Lewis was born in Hull and played in the youth teams of Manchester United before joining Stoke City in 1972. He never was really able to force his way into Tony Waddington's side and after 16 appearances in four seasons he left the Victoria Ground. He spent three years out of the game before joining Crewe Alexandra in 1979. He spent three seasons at Crewe making 132 appearances and spent a season at Telford United.

== Career statistics ==
Appearances and goals by club, season and competition
Club	Season	League			FA Cup		League Cup		Total	
Club	Season	Division	Apps	Goals	Apps	Goals	Apps	Goals	Apps	Goals
Stoke City	1972–73	First Division	1	0	0	0	0	0	1	0
Stoke City	1973–74	First Division	0	0	0	0	0	0	0	0
Stoke City	1974–75	First Division	5	0	0	0	1	0	6	0
Stoke City	1975–76	First Division	9	0	0	0	0	0	9	0
Stoke City	Total		15	0	0	0	1	0	16	0
Crewe Alexandra	1979–80	Fourth Division	30	0	1	0	2	0	33	0
Crewe Alexandra	1980–81	Fourth Division	46	0	1	0	2	0	49	0
Crewe Alexandra	1981–82	Fourth Division	46	2	2	0	2	0	50	2
Crewe Alexandra	Total		122	2	4	0	6	0	132	2
Career total			137	2	4	0	7	0	148	2
