= George O. Jackson Jr. =

American photographer

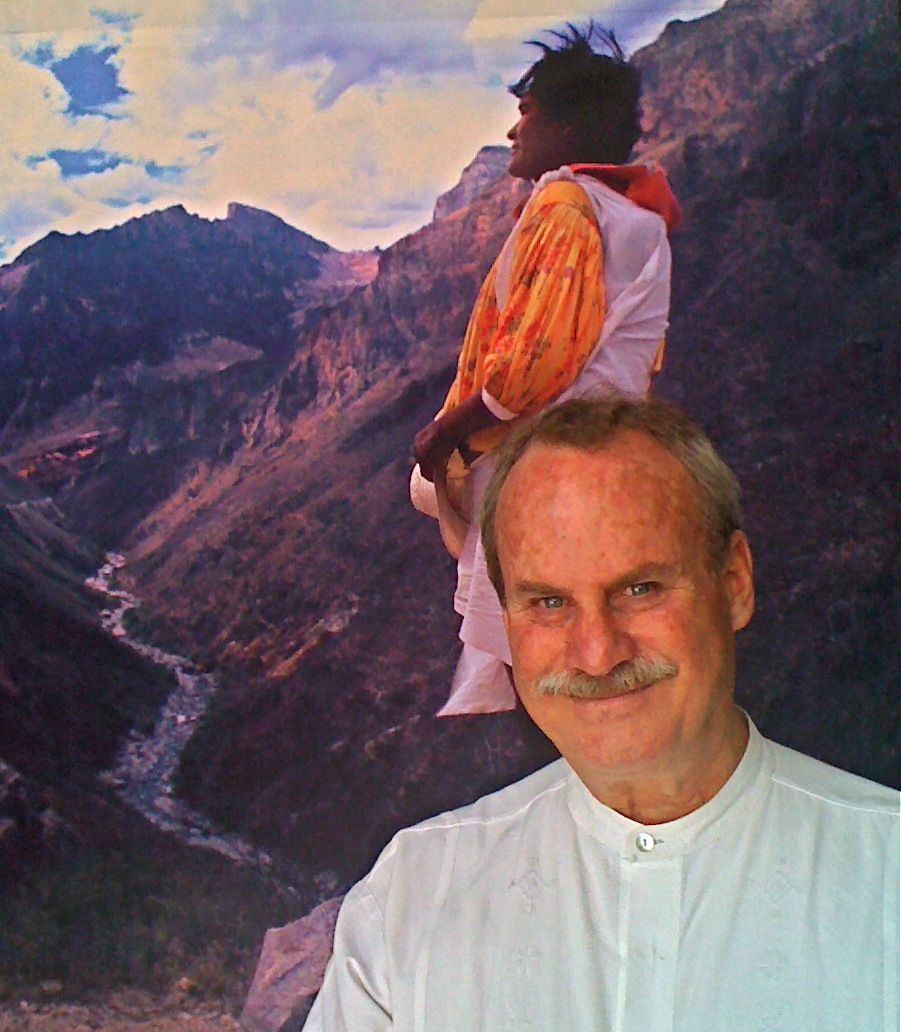
- George O. Jackson Jr. in front of one of his portraits of a Tarahumara Indian at the opening of his exhibit Mexican Cycles: Imágenes de George O. Jackson de Llano at the Museo Nacional de Antropología, Mexico City, in February 2011. Photograph by Ben Mason.
- Born: October 2, 1941 (age 84); Houston, Texas
- Other name: George O. Jackson de Llano
- Occupation: Photographer
- Known for: Documenting the seasonal religious festivals of the indigenous peoples of Mexico.

George O. Jackson Jr. (born October 2, 1941) is a photographer who documented the seasonal religious festivals of the indigenous peoples of Mexico. The photography project, called The Essence of Mexico, was conducted from 1990 through 2001 and resulted in more than 75,000 color images of the traditional rites and ceremonies of more than 60 different indigenous cultural groups. The original images now belong to the University of Texas in Austin, where they are part of the Benson Collection of Latin American Art. The collection is shared with the San Antonio Museum of Art's Nelson A. Rockefeller Center for Latin American Art in San Antonio, Texas.

== Early life ==
Jackson is the eldest son of the late George O. Jackson Sr., an insurance executive, and Dolores María de Llano Villarreal. He frequently uses his maternal family name in his professional work, exhibiting under the name George O. Jackson de Llano. His mother's family came from the state of Nuevo León in northern Mexico, where his maternal great-grandfather, Rubén Villarreal, owned silver mines. In around 1910, at the start of the Mexican Revolution, Villareal moved his family from Lampazos de Naranjo in Nuevo León to the border city of Laredo, Texas, where Jackson grew up. His mother’s father was a descendant of Manuel María de Llano, who served as mayor of Monterrey and twice as governor of Nuevo León during the 19th century. Jackson’s great uncle, Rodrigo de Llano, was the publisher of Excélsior, a major newspaper in Mexico City, from 1924 until his death in 1963.

=== Education ===
Growing up on the border in a bicultural household, Jackson was raised a Catholic and often traveled through Mexico visiting with family and friends. An indifferent student, Jackson graduated in 1960 from Riverside Military Academy in Georgia and attended the University of Texas at Austin in 1961.

=== Business career ===
In the 1970s Jackson frequently traveled in search of rare palms and cycads to the jungles of southern Mexico where he came in contact with indigenous communities, their traditional customs and festivals, and in 1977 he took up photography. During this time he developed and sold two restaurants in Houston, Hofbrau Steaks (1977) and the Cadillac Bar (1978). He also received a commission to design and decorate the historic Gage Hotel in Marathon, Texas. In 1989 a third Houston restaurant, Palacio Tzintzuntzan, opened briefly and failed. By this time Jackson had created his first photography collection, the Parklane Collection, a series of photographs of the Houston skyline taken between 1984 and 1990 from his 28th floor apartment. With the closing of Palacio Tzintzuntzan in 1990, Jackson began the project of photodocumenting the major festivals of each of Mexico’s indigenous folk cultures.

== The Essence of Mexico Project ==
The Essence of Mexico Collection, which includes original color slides and audio recordings, documents “more than 330 festivals held in communities spanning twenty-three states and the Federal District of Mexico, and encompass more than sixty different indigenous tribes.” The festivals are classified into four types: ritual agricultural calendar festivals, festivals honoring patron saints, deities, and virgin protectors of villages, groups, or labor; pilgrimage sanctuaries, and family-based rituals such as births, deaths, and weddings. The photographs are of dances, masks and costumes, music and songs, ceremonies, ritual battles, feasts, folk art and ephemera. In addition, some 8,800 of the 76,124 images are of landscapes, architecture, flora, fauna, and people Jackson encountered on his way to and from frequently remote and isolated festival locations during the decade he was living in Mexico. Roberto Tejada, now distinguished professor of art history at Southern Methodist University in Dallas, TX, wrote about the photographs in the Essence of Mexico Collection: “These seasonal celebrations are cultural patterns that point back to the uncertainty of the years that followed the near-total destruction of Mexico-Tenochtitlan. In addition, they articulate the severe processes that gradually led to the precarious condition of New Spain and its day to day contact between Spanish colonialists and the multiple indigenous communities in urban centers and countryside alike.”

== Exhibitions ==
Photographs from The Essence of Mexico Collection have been shown in museums and other venues around the world. Solo exhibitions include at the Houston Museum of Natural Science, Houston, TX (1992, 1995, 1996, 2000); the Museo Nacional de Culturas Populares, Mexico City (1993); the University of California, Davis, CA (1995); the Field Museum of Natural History, Chicago, IL (1999); the Smithsonian National Museum of Natural History, Washington, DC (2007-2008); the San Antonio Museum of Art, San Antonio, TX (2008); Museo Nacional de Antropología, Mexico City (2011); and La Photogalerie de la Maison des Amériques Latines, Paris, France (2011-2012).

== Books ==
Jackson’s photographs of Mexico have been the basis of several books. These include:

- Fiesta Mexicanas. Marta Turok y Imelde de Leon. Fotografias por George O. Jackson de Llano. México, DF: Editorial Jilguero, 1992.
- Words of the True Peoples/Palabras de los Seres Verdaderos: Anthology of Contemporary Mexican Indigenous-Language Writers/Antología de Escritores Actuales en Lenguas Indígenas de México. A three-volume anthology of indigenous narrative, poetry, and theater. Edited by Carlos Montemayor and Donald Frischmann. Photographs by George O. Jackson Jr. Austin: University of Texas Press, 2004, 2005, and 2006.
- Afro-Mexico: Dancing Between Myth and Reality. Anita González. Photographs by George O. Jackson Jr. and Jose Manuel Pellicer. Austin: University of Texas Press, 2010.

In addition, photographs by George O. Jackson have illustrated the following books:

- Houston: A Self Portrait. Edited by Jerry Herring. Text by Douglas Milburn. Photographs by George O. Jackson, et al. Houston: Herring Press, 1986.
- Rituals of Rule, Rituals of Resistance: Public Celebrations and Popular Culture in Mexico. Edited by William H. Beezley, Cheryl E. Martin, and William E. French. Lanham, Maryland: Rowman & Littlefield, 1994.
- Mexique Vivant. Jean Mazel. Photography George O. Jackson. Le Pontet, France: Alain Barthélémy, 1999.
- Chocolate: Pathway to the Gods. Meredith Dreiss and Sharon Edgar Greenhill. With photographs by George O. Jackson. Tucson: University of Arizona Press, 2008.

== Other Photographic Work ==
Besides the Parklane Collection (1984-1990) and The Essence of Mexico Collection (1990-2001), Jackson has also created, among other work:

- Calaveras (2009-2012) -- The Calaveras photographs, based on a skull-shaped liquor bottle, draw upon a long tradition of death’s head imagery—from the ghoulish tzompantli (the racks of skulls and the carved stone walls built by the pre-Columbian peoples of Mesoamerica) to the comic sugar skulls popular in Mexico today during celebrations of the Day of the Dead.
