= List of Stoke City F.C. seasons =

Graph showing Stoke City F.C.'s progress through the English football league system 1888 to the present

Stoke City Football Club is an English professional football club based in the city of Stoke-on-Trent, Staffordshire. The club was formed in 1863 and played their first competitive match in November 1883 in the FA Cup. They were founder members of the Football League in 1888, in which they struggled finishing bottom in the first two seasons and failed to gain re-election for the 1890–91 meaning that they played in the Football Alliance. They won the Alliance and re-joined the league. Stoke continued to struggle financially and in 1908 the club was liquidated and had to resign from the league. They re-branded as Stoke F.C. (1908) and joined the Birmingham & District League and Southern Football League before regaining their league status for the 1919–20 season.

As a Football League team Stoke have won two divisional titles at the second and third levels of the English football league system. They have been promoted eight times and suffered relegation on seven occasions. They played in the 2011 FA Cup Final, losing to Manchester City and their best achievement is in the League Cup which they beat Chelsea in the 1972 Final. As of the end of the 2025–26 season, the club has spent 62 seasons in the top tier of the English football league system, 49 in the second and 8 in the third.

== History ==
Stoke were formed as Stoke Ramblers F.C. in 1863 they soon dropped the 'Ramblers' name and simply became known as Stoke F.C., and they played in friendlies against local and national sides as well as competing in the Staffordshire Senior Cup which was a prestigious competition at the time. Stoke entered the FA Cup in the 1883–84 season and their first competitive fixture was against Manchester which they lost 2–1. They continued with this type of fixture list until in 1888 the Football League was founded and Stoke became founder members. In the first league season Stoke finished bottom of the table and again took bottom spot in the second season leading to the club being replaced by Sunderland. Stoke joined the Football Alliance and claimed the title and were re-elected back into the league. Stoke continued to struggle and had a number of narrow escapes from relegation in the early 1900s. Eventually the club's fortunes ran out and they were relegated to the Second Division in the 1906–07. The next season Stoke's finances dried up and the club was liquidated and they had to resign from the league. They were saved by a number of local business men and incredibly they were able to apply for re-election but they failed to gain enough votes and had to enter the Birmingham & District League and Southern Football League.

Stoke re-entered the League after World War I and during the 1920s the club added 'City' to their name and had the highs of being promoted to the First Division and the lows of being relegated to the Third Division North. Despite the divisional changes Stoke brought through a number of promising youth players most notably that of Stanley Matthews. Stoke went on to gain promotion to the First Division in the 1932–33 season and went on to finished in 4th place in the 1935–36 season, their highest position until that point. Immediately after World War II Stoke were involved in a title race and they had the chance to become champions of England for the first time on the final day of the 1946–47 season they needed to beat Sheffield United to claim the title, but they lost 2–1 and ended up finishing 4th for the second time.

Relegation to the Second Division was suffered in the 1952–53 season and it took Stoke ten season to get back into the First Division with Tony Waddington helping Stoke to gain promotion. He had a successful time at Stoke leading the club to their first major trophy in 1972, winning the Football League Cup as well as reaching the semi-final of the FA Cup and competed in European football on two occasions. However Stoke's Victoria Ground was damaged by gale-force winds in January 1976 and the club had to sell their best players to cover the cost for the repairs. This eventually led to Stoke being relegated the following 1976–77 season, Stoke soon made a return though gaining promotion in 1978–79 season. In the 1984–85 season Stoke experienced a terrible season finishing bottom after picking up a record low of 17 points. Five seasons of Second Division obscurity followed before the club slipped into the third tier for the second time.

Lou Macari got Stoke out of the Third Division at the second time of asking and guided the club to the 1995–96 play-offs but lost out to Leicester City. Stoke moved to the all-seater Britannia Stadium in 1997 but were relegated to the third tier in the first season at the new ground. Four seasons in Division Two followed during which time the club had won their second Football League Trophy and entered the play-offs three times eventually gaining promotion at the third attempt. Tony Pulis became Stoke manager in November 2002 and lead the club to safety on the final day of the 2002–03 season. He was sacked at the end of the 2004–05 season but was re-appointed by returning chairman Peter Coates in July 2006. He led the club to promotion to the Premier League in 2007–08 season and has since helped the club to establish themselves back in English football's top tier. Stoke reached the FA Cup Final for the first time in the 2010–11 season losing 1–0 to Manchester City. On reaching the final Stoke qualified for the UEFA Europa League where they reached the last 32, losing out to Valencia. Pulis was replaced by Mark Hughes in May 2013 and he guided the club to their highest Premier League position of 9th in three successive seasons 2013–14, 2014–15 and 2015–16. Decline set in under Hughes in 2016–17 which led to relegation in 2017–18.

== Key ==
Key to league record:

- Pld – Matches played
- W – Matches won
- D – Matches drawn
- L – Matches lost
- GF – Goals for
- GA – Goals against
- Pts – Points
- Pos – Final position

Key to colours and symbols:

1st or W	Winners
2nd or RU	Runners-up
↑	Promoted
↓	Relegated

Key to rounds:

- Prelim – Preliminary round
- GS – Group stage
- QR3 – Third qualifying round
- QR4 – Fourth qualifying round, etc.
- R1 – First round
- R2 – Second round, etc.
- QF – Quarter-final
- SF – Semi-final
- 3rdP – Third place
- F – Finalists
- W – Winners
- DQ – Disqualified
- DNE – Did not enter

== Seasons ==
Season	League									FA Cup	League Cup	Europe / Other		Top goalscorer(s)	
Season	Division	Pld	W	D	L	GF	GA	Pts	Pos	FA Cup	League Cup	Europe / Other		Player(s)	Goals
1883–84	—									R1	—	—	—	Edward Johnson	1
1884–85	—									R1	—	—	—	—	—
1885–86	—									R1	—	—	—	Jimmy Sayer & George Shutt	1
1886–87	—									R2	—	—	—	Alf Edge	6
1887–88	—									R5	—	—	—	Wally Owen	3
1888–89	The Football League (Note: Stoke joined the Football League as inaugural members along with eleven other clubs.)	22	4	4	14	26	51	12	12th (Note: Finished bottom of the Football League and are re-elected.)	QR1	—	—	—	Bob McSkimming	6
1889–90	The Football League ↓	22	3	4	15	27	69	10	12th (Note: Finished bottom of the Football League and failed to be re-elected.)	QF	—	—	—	Freddie Gee	5
1890–91	Football Alliance ↑	22	13	7	2	57	39	33	1st (Note: Re-elected back to the Football League after winning the Football Alliance.)	QF	—	—	—	Alf Edge	12
1891–92	The Football League	26	5	4	17	38	61	14	13th	QF	—	—	—	Joe Schofield	9
1892–93	First Division (Note: The Football League is expanded into two Divisions, the First Division and Second Division.)	30	12	5	13	58	48	29	7th	R1	—	—	—	Joe Schofield	13
1893–94	First Division	30	13	3	14	65	79	29	11th (Note: Re-elected after beating Sheffield United by one vote.)	R2	—	United Counties League (Note: Competed in the short-lived United Counties League which was scrapped after one season.)	GS	Joe Schofield	15
1894–95	First Division	30	9	6	15	50	67	24	14th (Note: Retained place in the First Division after beating Newton Heath 3–0 in a Test Match.)	R2	—	—	—	Joe Schofield	13
1895–96	First Division	30	15	0	15	56	47	30	6th	QF	—	—	—	Tommy Hyslop	17
1896–97	First Division	30	11	3	16	48	59	25	13th	R2	—	—	—	William Maxwell	13
1897–98	First Division	30	8	8	14	35	55	24	16th (Note: Retained place in the First Division after success in the Test Matches. However it was in controversial circumstances as in the final match against Burnley both sides knew a draw would see them play in the First Division, unsurprisingly the game ended 0–0 with neither side attempting to score a goal. The Football League decided to expand the First Division to 18 teams and scrap the Test Match system in favor of automatic promotion and relegation.)	R2	—	—	—	William Maxwell	12
1898–99	First Division	34	13	7	14	47	52	33	12th	SF	—	—	—	William Maxwell	16
1899–1900	First Division	34	13	8	13	47	45	34	9th	R1	—	—	—	William Maxwell	11
1900–01	First Division	34	11	5	18	46	57	27	16th	R1	—	—	—	William Maxwell	16
1901–02	First Division	34	11	9	14	45	55	31	16th	QF	—	—	—	Mart Watkins	15
1902–03	First Division	34	15	7	12	46	38	37	6th	QF	—	—	—	Mart Watkins	12
1903–04	First Division	34	10	7	17	54	57	27	16th	R1	—	—	—	Arthur Capes	11
1904–05	First Division	34	13	4	17	40	58	30	12th	R2	—	—	—	Fred Rouse	12
1905–06	First Division	38	16	7	15	54	55	39	10th	R2	—	—	—	Jack Hall	11
1906–07	First Division ↓	38	8	10	20	41	64	26	20th	R1	—	—	—	John Chalmers	11
1907–08	Second Division ↓	38	16	5	17	57	52	37	10th (Note: Placed into liquidation at the end of the season and resigned from the Football League. This prompted swift action from a group of local business men who bought the club and re-incorporated it. These impressive efforts lead to the club applying for re-election but they lost out to Tottenham Hotspur and had to take their reserve teams' place in the Birmingham & District League.)	QF	—	—	—	Tom Holford	12
1908–09	Birmingham & District League	34	13	5	16	71	64	31	8th	R1	—	—	—	William Davies	14
1909–10	Birmingham & District League	34	15	7	12	82	52	37	7th	R1	—	Birmingham League Cup	R3	Amos Baddeley	24
1909–10	Southern League Division Two (Note: Joined the Southern League as the board believed that would present a better chance of being re-elected to the Football League.)	10	10	0	0	48	9	20	1st (Note: Despite winning all of their ten matches in Division Two promotion to Division One was not achieved due to a league re-organisation.)	R1	—	Birmingham League Cup	R3	Arthur Griffiths	36
1910–11	Birmingham & District League	34	24	2	8	95	48	50	1st (Note: First Team leave the Birmingham & District League to concentrate on the Southern League, the reserve side take their place.)	R1	—	—	—	Jack Peart	31
1910–11	Southern League Division Two ↑	22	17	1	4	72	21	35	2nd	R1	—	—	—	Alf Smith	31
1911–12	Southern League Division One	38	13	10	15	51	63	36	10th	QR5	—	—	—	William Smith	9
1912–13	Southern League Division One ↓	38	10	4	24	39	75	24	20th	R1	—	—	—	Alf Smith	9
1913–14	Southern League Division Two	30	19	2	9	71	34	40	5th	R1	—	—	—	Alf Smith	16
1914–15	Southern League Division Two ↑	24	17	4	3	62	15	38	1st (Note: Re-elected to the Football League.)	QR3	—	—	—	Arthur Watkin	24
1915–19	No competitive football was played between 1915 and 1919 due to the First World War														
1919–20	Second Division	42	18	6	18	60	54	42	10th	R1	—	—	—	David Brown	13
1920–21	Second Division	42	12	11	19	46	56	35	20th	R1	—	—	—	Arthur Watkin	15
1921–22	Second Division ↑	42	18	16	8	60	44	52	2nd	R3	—	—	—	Jimmy Broad	25
1922–23	First Division ↓	42	10	10	22	47	67	30	21st	R2	—	—	—	Jimmy Broad	23
1923–24	Second Division	42	14	18	10	44	42	46	6th	R1	—	—	—	Jimmy Broad	14
1924–25	Second Division	42	12	11	19	34	46	35	20th	R1	—	—	—	Harry Davies	8
1925–26	Second Division ↓	42	12	8	22	54	77	32	21st	R4	—	—	—	Bobby Archibald	10
1926–27	Third Division North ↑	42	27	9	6	92	40	63	1st	R1	—	—	—	Charlie Wilson	25
1927–28	Second Division	42	22	8	12	78	59	52	5th	QF	—	—	—	Charlie Wilson	32
1928–29	Second Division	42	17	12	13	74	51	46	6th	R3	—	—	—	Charlie Wilson	22
1929–30	Second Division	42	16	8	18	74	72	40	11th	R3	—	—	—	Charlie Wilson	20
1930–31	Second Division	42	17	10	15	64	71	44	11th	R3	—	—	—	Wilf Kirkham	14
1931–32	Second Division	42	19	14	9	69	48	52	3rd	R5	—	—	—	Joe Mawson	20
1932–33	Second Division ↑	42	25	6	11	78	39	56	1st	R4	—	—	—	Joe Mawson	16
1933–34	First Division	42	15	11	16	58	71	41	12th	QF	—	—	—	Tommy Sale	15
1934–35	First Division	42	18	6	18	71	70	42	10th	R3	—	—	—	Tommy Sale	24
1935–36	First Division	42	20	7	15	57	57	47	4th (Note: Highest League finish.)	R5	—	—	—	Tommy Sale	14
1936–37	First Division	42	15	12	15	72	57	42	10th	R4	—	—	—	Freddie Steele	33
1937–38	First Division	42	13	12	17	58	59	38	17th	R4	—	—	—	Freddie Steele	15
1938–39	First Division	42	17	12	13	71	68	46	7th	R3	—	—	—	Freddie Steele	26
1939–40	First Division	3	1	1	1	7	4	4	8th (Note: When the Second World War began, the 1939–40 Football League season was abandoned with three matches played and Stoke in eighth position.)	—	—	—	—	Tommy Sale	3
1939–46	No competitive football was played between 1939 and 1946 due to the Second World War														
1945–46	—									QF (Note: With the war reaching its conclusion the FA Cup made a return in 1945–46 with rounds played over two-legs. Attendances were very large and when Stoke played at Bolton Wanderers over 65,000 crammed into Burnden Park, and unfortunately two barriers collapsed killing 33 people.)	—	—	—	Freddie Steele	7
1946–47	First Division	42	24	7	11	90	53	55	4th (Note: Highest League finish.)	R5	—	—	—	Freddie Steele	29
1947–48	First Division	42	14	10	18	41	55	38	15th	R4	—	—	—	Freddie Steele	10
1948–49	First Division	42	16	9	17	66	68	41	11th	R5	—	—	—	Frank Bowyer	21
1949–50	First Division	42	11	12	19	45	75	34	19th	R3	—	—	—	Frank Bowyer	15
1950–51	First Division	42	13	14	15	50	59	40	13th	R5	—	—	—	Frank Bowyer	16
1951–52	First Division	42	12	7	23	49	88	31	20th	R4	—	—	—	Sammy Smyth	12
1952–53	First Division ↓	42	12	10	20	53	66	34	21st	R4	—	—	—	Harry Oscroft	10
1953–54	Second Division	42	12	17	13	71	60	41	11th	R4	—	—	—	Frank Bowyer	14
1954–55	Second Division	42	21	10	11	69	46	52	5th	R4	—	—	—	Harry Oscroft	21
1955–56	Second Division	42	20	4	18	71	62	44	13th	R5	—	—	—	Frank Bowyer Johnny King	18
1956–57	Second Division	42	20	8	14	83	58	48	5th	R3	—	—	—	Tim Coleman	26
1957–58	Second Division	42	18	6	18	75	73	42	11th	R5	—	—	—	George Kelly	22
1958–59	Second Division	42	21	7	14	72	58	49	5th	R4	—	—	—	Dennis Wilshaw	18
1959–60	Second Division	42	14	7	21	66	83	35	17th	R3	—	—	—	Frank Bowyer	14
1960–61	Second Division	42	12	12	18	51	59	36	18th	R5	R2	—	—	Johnny King	12
1961–62	Second Division	42	17	8	17	55	57	42	8th	R4	R2	—	—	Tommy Thompson	16
1962–63	Second Division ↑	42	20	13	9	73	50	52	1st	R3	R3	—	—	Dennis Viollet	23
1963–64	First Division	42	14	10	18	77	78	38	17th	R5	RU (Note: Stoke reached their first major final in 1963–64, losing a two-legged tie 4–3 to Leicester City.)	—	—	John Ritchie	18
1964–65	First Division	42	16	10	16	67	66	42	11th	R4	R4	—	—	John Ritchie	25
1965–66	First Division	42	15	12	15	65	64	42	10th	R3	R4	—	—	John Ritchie	13
1966–67	First Division	42	17	7	18	63	58	41	12th	R3	R2	—	—	Peter Dobing	19
1967–68	First Division	42	14	7	21	50	73	35	18th	R4	QF	—	—	Harry Burrows Peter Dobing	15
1968–69	First Division	42	9	15	18	40	63	33	19th	R5	R2	—	—	David Herd	9
1969–70	First Division	42	15	15	12	56	52	45	9th	R4	R2	—	—	John Ritchie Harry Burrows	14
1970–71	First Division	42	12	13	17	44	48	37	13th	SF	R2	Anglo-Italian Cup; Texaco Cup	GS; R1	John Ritchie	19
1971–72	First Division	42	10	15	17	39	56	35	17th	SF	W (Note: Won their first major trophy, beating Chelsea 2–1 at Wembley.)	Anglo-Italian Cup; Texaco Cup	GS; R2	John Ritchie	18
1972–73	First Division	42	14	10	18	61	56	38	15th	R3	R4	UEFA Cup (Note: First match in a European competition was against German side 1. FC Kaiserslautern. Despite a 3–1 first leg lead Stoke lost the return leg 4–0 and were eliminated 5–3 on aggregate.)	R1	Jimmy Greenhoff	20
1973–74	First Division	42	15	16	11	54	42	46	5th	R3	R4	Texaco Cup; Watney Cup (Note: Won the short-lived Watney Cup, beating Hull City in the 2–0 final.)	R1; W	John Ritchie	15
1974–75	First Division	42	17	15	10	64	48	49	5th	R3	R4	UEFA Cup (Note: Played Dutch side Ajax in the UEFA Cup first round. Both legs were drawn 1–1 at home and 0–0 away meaning Stoke were eliminated on the away goals rule.)	R1	Jimmy Greenhoff	15
1975–76	First Division	42	15	11	16	48	50	41	12th	R5	R2	—	—	Jimmy Greenhoff	13
1976–77	First Division ↓	42	10	14	18	28	51	34	21st	R3	R3	—	—	Terry Conroy Garth Crooks	6
1977–78	Second Division	42	16	10	16	53	49	42	7th	R4	R2	—	—	Garth Crooks	19
1978–79	Second Division ↑	42	20	16	6	58	31	56	3rd	R3	QF	—	—	Brendan O'Callaghan	16
1979–80	First Division	42	13	10	19	44	58	36	18th	R3	R3	—	—	Garth Crooks	15
1980–81	First Division	42	12	18	12	51	60	42	11th	R3	R2	—	—	Lee Chapman	17
1981–82	First Division	42	12	8	22	44	63	44	18th	R3	R2	—	—	Lee Chapman	17
1982–83	First Division	42	16	9	17	53	64	57	13th	R4	R2	—	—	Mickey Thomas	12
1983–84	First Division	42	13	11	18	44	63	50	18th	R3	R4	—	—	Paul Maguire	10
1984–85	First Division ↓	42	3	8	31	24	91	17	22nd	R3	R2	—	—	Ian Painter	9
1985–86	Second Division	42	14	15	13	48	50	57	10th	R3	R3	Full Members' Cup	R3	Keith Bertschin	21
1986–87	Second Division	42	16	10	16	63	53	58	8th	R5	R2	Full Members' Cup	R1	Carl Saunders	19
1987–88	Second Division	44	17	11	16	50	57	62	11th	R3	R4	Full Members' Cup	R4	Phil Heath Graham Shaw	8
1988–89	Second Division	46	15	14	17	57	72	59	13th	R4	R2	Full Members' Cup	R1	Dave Bamber Peter Beagrie	9
1989–90	Second Division ↓	46	6	19	21	35	63	37	24th	R3	R2	Full Members' Cup	R3	Wayne Biggins	10
1990–91	Third Division	46	16	12	18	55	59	60	14th (Note: Lowest League finish.)	R2	R2	League Trophy	R2	Wayne Biggins	12
1991–92	Third Division	46	21	14	11	69	49	77	4th (Note: Competed in the Football League play-offs for the first time, losing 2–1 on aggregate to Stockport County.)	R1	R2	League Trophy (Note: Beat Stockport County 1–0 in front of 48,339 at Wembley.)	W	Wayne Biggins	24
1992–93	Second Division (Note: Due to the Formation of the Premier League in 1992 the Third Division was renamed Second Division.) ↑	46	27	12	7	73	34	93	1st	R1	R2	League Trophy	SF	Mark Stein	30
1993–94	First Division	46	18	13	15	57	59	67	10th	R4	R2	Anglo-Italian Cup	GS	Dave Regis	13
1994–95	First Division	46	16	15	15	50	53	63	11th	R3	R3	Anglo-Italian Cup	SF	Paul Peschisolido	15
1995–96	First Division	46	20	13	13	60	49	73	4th (Note: Lost First Division play-offs 1–0 on aggregate to Leicester City.)	R3	R3	Anglo-Italian Cup	GS	Mike Sheron	15
1996–97	First Division	46	18	10	18	51	57	64	12th	R3	R3	—	—	Mike Sheron	23
1997–98	First Division ↓	46	11	13	22	44	74	46	23rd	R3	R3	—	—	Peter Thorne	16
1998–99	Second Division	46	21	6	19	59	63	69	8th	R2	R1	League Trophy	R2	Graham Kavanagh	13
1999–2000	Second Division	46	23	13	10	68	42	82	6th (Note: Lost Second Division play-offs 5–3 on aggregate to Gillingham.)	R1	R2	League Trophy (Note: Beat Bristol City 2–1 in front of 75,057 at Wembley.)	W	Peter Thorne	30
2000–01	Second Division	46	21	14	11	74	49	77	5th (Note: Lost Second Division play-offs 4–2 on aggregate to Walsall.)	R1	R4	League Trophy	QF	Peter Thorne	19
2001–02	Second Division ↑	46	23	11	12	67	40	80	5th (Note: Promoted after beating Brentford 2–0 in the play-off final at the Millennium Stadium.)	R3	R1	League Trophy	R1	Chris Iwelumo	12
2002–03	First Division	46	12	14	20	45	69	50	21st	R5	R1	—	—	Andy Cooke Chris Iwelumo	7
2003–04	First Division	46	18	12	16	58	55	66	11th	R3	R2	—	—	Ade Akinbiyi Gifton Noel-Williams	10
2004–05	Championship (Note: First Division was renamed the Championship from the 2004–05 season.)	46	17	10	19	36	38	61	12th	R3	R1	—	—	Gifton Noel-Williams	13
2005–06	Championship	46	17	7	22	54	63	58	13th	R5	R1	—	—	Paul Gallagher	12
2006–07	Championship	46	19	16	11	62	41	73	8th	R4	R1	—	—	Ricardo Fuller	11
2007–08	Championship ↑	46	21	16	9	69	55	79	2nd	R3	R1	—	—	Ricardo Fuller Liam Lawrence	15
2008–09	Premier League	38	12	9	17	38	55	45	12th	R3	QF	—	—	Ricardo Fuller	11
2009–10	Premier League	38	11	14	13	34	48	47	11th	QF	R4	—	—	Ricardo Fuller	8
2010–11	Premier League	38	13	7	18	46	48	46	13th	RU (Note: Reached their first FA Cup Final and lost 1–0 to Manchester City. Stoke had previously beaten Bolton Wanderers 5–0 in the semi-final.)	R4	—	—	Kenwyne Jones Jonathan Walters	12
2011–12	Premier League	38	11	12	15	36	53	45	14th	QF	R4	UEFA Europa League (Note: Competing in European football for the third time Stoke were eliminated by Valencia at the round of 32 stage. Stoke had previously beaten Hajduk Split, FC Thun in qualifying rounds and progressed through a group containing Beşiktaş, Dynamo Kyiv and Maccabi Tel Aviv.)	R32	Peter Crouch	14
2012–13	Premier League	38	9	15	14	34	45	42	13th	R4	R2	—	—	Jonathan Walters	11
2013–14	Premier League	38	13	11	14	45	52	50	9th	R4	QF	—	—	Peter Crouch	10
2014–15	Premier League	38	15	9	14	48	45	54	9th	R5	R4	—	—	Mame Biram Diouf	12
2015–16	Premier League	38	14	9	15	41	55	51	9th	R4	SF	—	—	Marko Arnautović	12
2016–17	Premier League	38	11	11	16	41	56	44	13th	R3	R3	—	—	Peter Crouch	10
2017–18	Premier League ↓	38	7	12	19	35	68	33	19th	R3	R3	—	—	Xherdan Shaqiri	8
2018–19	Championship	46	11	22	13	45	52	55	16th	R3	R3	—	—	Benik Afobe	9
2019–20	Championship	46	16	8	22	62	68	56	15th	R3	R3	—	—	Sam Clucas	11
2020–21	Championship	46	15	15	16	50	52	60	14th	R3	QF	—	—	Nick Powell	12
2021–22	Championship	46	17	11	18	57	52	62	14th	R5	R4	—	—	Jacob Brown	14
2022–23	Championship	46	14	11	21	55	54	53	16th	R5	R1	—	—	Jacob Brown Tyrese Campbell	9
2023–24	Championship	46	15	11	20	49	60	56	17th	R3	R3	—	—	André Vidigal	7
2024–25	Championship	46	12	15	19	45	62	51	18th	R4	R4	—	—	Tom Cannon	10
2025–26	Championship	46	15	10	21	51	56	55	17th	R4	R2	—	—	Sorba Thomas	10
