= Harry Oscroft =

English footballer (1926–2008)

Personal information
- Full name: Harold Oscroft
- Date of birth: 10 March 1926
- Place of birth: Mansfield, England
- Date of death: 31 December 2008 (aged 82)
- Place of death: England
- Position: Left winger

Youth career
- Mansfield Colliery

Senior career*
Years	Team	Apps	(Gls)
	Sheffield United	0	(0)
1947–1950	Mansfield Town	113	(41)
1950–1959	Stoke City	326	(103)
1959–1961	Port Vale	47	(12)
- Brantham Athletic
- Sutton United
Total		486	(156)

Managerial career
- Brantham Athletic
- * Club domestic league appearances and goals

Harry Oscroft (10 March 1926 – 31 December 2008) was an English footballer. A left winger, he scored over 150 goals in nearly 500 league games in a 14-year career in the English Football League.

He played for Mansfield Town for three years before signing for Stoke City in January 1950. He made 349 appearances and scored 106 goals for the "Potters", before he was traded to Port Vale in September 1959. He left the "Valiants" in May 1961 and later turned out for non-League clubs Brantham Athletic and Sutton United.

== Playing career ==
=== Mansfield Town ===
Oscroft began his career with Mansfield Colliery and served in the Royal Navy at 17. He had trials at Notts County and Sheffield United in 1946. In 1945, he began working at a Nottingham hosiery factory and was spotted playing football on his lunchtime break by Mansfield Town manager Roy Goodall in February 1947. The "Stags" finished eighth in the Third Division North in 1947–48, tenth in 1948–49, and eighth again in 1949–50. He scored 39 goals in 112 league games during his spell at Field Mill.

=== Stoke City ===
In January 1950, at age 23, he joined Stoke City after Bob McGrory offered Mansfield manager Freddie Steele £8,000 plus Verdi Godwin. He scored three goals in 16 First Division games in 1949–50. He hit six goals in 39 appearances in 1950–51, before hitting 10 goals in 44 games in 1951–52. McGrory was then replaced as manager by Frank Taylor. Oscroft hit ten goals in 39 games in 1952–53 to become the club's top scorer, as the "Potters" were relegated into the Second Division after finishing one point behind 20th place Manchester City. He bagged 13 goals in 36 appearances in 1953–54, before hitting 21 goals in 38 games in 1954–55 to become the club's top-scorer for a second time. He hit his first hat-trick for Stoke on 2 October 1954, in a 4–1 win over Lincoln City at Sincil Bank. Oscroft hit 18 goals in 43 games in 1955–56, becoming the club's joint-top-scorer, along with Frank Bowyer and Johnny King. City suffered six games losing streak in which they failed to find the net late into the 1956–57 campaign, which ultimately cost them promotion; Oscroft still managed 12 goals in 42 appearances throughout the season. He was limited to 22 games and seven goals in 1957–58. He found eight goals in 30 appearances in 1958–59, as Stoke failed to win promotion again. A prolific goalscorer, averaging nearly one goal in every three games during his ten years at the Victoria Ground, he made 349 appearances. He scored 106 goals, becoming the club's sixth highest goalscorer of all time (as of 2012).

=== Later career ===
In September 1959, he was traded to rivals Port Vale, along with Peter Ford, for Dickie Cunliffe and £2,000. He hit seven goals in 29 appearances in 1959–60, including four in the final day of the campaign in a 6–1 hammering of Swindon Town at Vale Park. He scored five goals in 21 Third Division games in 1960–61. He was handed a free transfer by the "Valiants" boss Norman Low in May 1961.

== Style of play ==
Oscroft was known to often go "missing" during games, but could also provide moments of inspiration for his team. He possessed a powerful left-foot shot.

== Management career and later life ==
He retired to the Essex/Suffolk border, where he became player-manager for Brantham Athletic, with whom he won the Suffolk Senior Cup in 1962. He then played a few games for Sutton United and finally retired from the game completely in 1988 and lived near Colchester.

He died in his sleep on 31 December 2008 after being cared for at home by his family; he had been suffering from Alzheimers for some years before he died.

== Career statistics ==
Appearances and goals by club, season and competition
Club	Season	League			FA Cup		Total	
Club	Season	Division	Apps	Goals	Apps	Goals	Apps	Goals
Mansfield Town	1946–47	Third Division South	12	3	0	0	12	3
Mansfield Town	1947–48	Third Division North	40	12	3	1	43	13
Mansfield Town	1948–49	Third Division North	38	14	3	3	41	17
Mansfield Town	1949–50	Third Division North	23	12	2	0	25	12
Mansfield Town	Total		113	41	8	4	121	45
Stoke City	1949–50	First Division	16	3	0	0	16	3
Stoke City	1950–51	First Division	35	6	4	0	39	6
Stoke City	1951–52	First Division	40	10	4	0	44	10
Stoke City	1952–53	First Division	37	10	2	0	39	10
Stoke City	1953–54	Second Division	33	13	3	0	36	13
Stoke City	1954–55	Second Division	37	21	1	0	38	21
Stoke City	1955–56	Second Division	38	15	5	2	43	17
Stoke City	1956–57	Second Division	41	11	1	1	42	12
Stoke City	1957–58	Second Division	21	6	1	1	22	7
Stoke City	1958–59	Second Division	28	8	2	0	30	8
Stoke City	Total		326	103	23	4	349	107
Port Vale	1959–60	Third Division	26	7	1	0	27	7
Port Vale	1960–61	Third Division	21	5	0	0	21	5
Port Vale	Total		47	12	1	0	48	12
Career total			486	156	32	8	518	164

== Honours ==
Brantham Athletic

- Suffolk Senior Cup: 1962
