= Colin Hutchinson =

English footballer

Personal information
- Full name: Colin Hutchinson
- Date of birth: 20 October 1936
- Place of birth: Consett, England
- Date of death: 20 January 2017 (aged 80)
- Position: Winger

Senior career*
Years	Team	Apps	(Gls)
–	Crook Hall		
1954–1958	Stoke City	9	(0)
1958	Stafford Rangers		
1959	Crewe Alexandra	0	(0)
1960–1965	Macclesfield Town	53	(18)

Managerial career
- 1965–1969: Stafford Rangers
- 1973–1979: Nantwich Town
- 1979–1981: Droylsden
- * Club domestic league appearances and goals

Colin Hutchinson (20 October 1936 – 20 January 2017) was an English footballer who played in the Football League for Stoke City.

== Career ==
Hutchinson was born in Consett and played for Crook Hall before signing for Football League side Stoke City after a successful trial. He struggled to break into Frank Taylor's first team and in four seasons he managed to make just nine appearances. He joined Stafford Rangers and had an unsuccessful spell with Crewe Alexandra. He managed Stafford Rangers between 1965 and 1969, before taking charge of Nantwich Town(1973–1979) and Droylsden (1979–1981).

== Career statistics ==
Appearances and goals by club, season and competition
Club	Season	League			FA Cup		Other		Total	
Club	Season	Division	Apps	Goals	Apps	Goals	Apps	Goals	Apps	Goals
Stoke City	1954–55	Second Division	6	0	0	0	—		6	0
Stoke City	1955–56	Second Division	0	0	0	0	—		0	0
Stoke City	1956–57	Second Division	1	0	0	0	—		1	0
Stoke City	1957–58	Second Division	2	0	0	0	—		2	0
Stoke City	Total		9	0	0	0	—		9	0
Macclesfield Town	1962–63	Cheshire League	1	0	0	0	0	0	1	0
Macclesfield Town	1963–64	Cheshire League	39	15	5	1	11	2	55	18
Macclesfield Town	1964–65	Cheshire League	13	3	3	0	1	2	17	5
Macclesfield Town	Total		53	18	8	1	12	4	73	23
Career total			62	18	8	1	12	4	82	23
