= List of Stoke City F.C. records and statistics =

Stoke City Football Club is an English professional association football club based in Stoke-on-Trent, Staffordshire.

Founded as Stoke Ramblers in 1863 the club changed its name to Stoke in 1878 and then to Stoke City in 1925 after Stoke-on-Trent was granted city status. They are the second oldest professional football club in the world, after Notts County, and are one of the founding members of the Football League. They currently play in the Football League Championship, the second tier of English football. They have never been lower than the third tier.

Their first, and to date only major trophy, the League Cup was won in 1972, when the team beat Chelsea 2–1. The club's highest league finish in the top division is 4th, which was achieved in the 1935–36 and 1946–47 seasons. Stoke played in the FA Cup Final in 2011, finishing runners-up to Manchester City and have reached three FA Cup semi-finals; in 1899 then consecutively in 1971 and 1972. Stoke have competed in European football on three occasions, firstly in 1972–73 then in 1974–75 and most recently in 2011–12. The club has won the Football League Trophy twice, in 1992 and in 2000. The club's record appearance maker is Eric Skeels, who made 597 appearances between 1959 and 1976, and the club's record goalscorer is John Ritchie, who scored 176 goals in 351 appearances from 1962 to 1975.

== Honours ==
=== League ===
Football League Championship

- Runners-up: 2007–08

Football League Second Division: 3

- Champions: 1932–33, 1962–63, 1992–93
- Runners-up: 1921–22
- Third Place: (Promoted) 1978–79
- Play-off Winners: 2001–02

Football League Third Division North: 1

- Champions: 1926–27

Football Alliance: 1

- Champions: 1890–91

Birmingham & District League: 1

- Champions: 1910–11

Southern League Division Two: 2

- Champions:1909–10, 1914–15
- Runners-up: 1910–11

=== Cups ===
FA Cup

- Runners-up: 2010–11
- Semi-finalists: 1898–99, 1970–71 (3rd place), 1971–72 (4th place)

League Cup: 1

- Winners: 1971–72
- Runners-up: 1963–64

Football League Trophy: 2

- Winners: 1991–92, 1999–2000

Watney Cup: 1

- Winners: 1973

Staffordshire Senior Cup: 15

- Winners: 1877–78, 1878–79, 1903–04 (shared), 1913–14, 1933–34, 1964–65, 1968–69 (shared), 1970–71, 1974–75, 1975–76, 1981–82, 1992–93, 1994–95, 1998–99, 2016–17
- Runners-up: 1882–83, 1885–86, 1894–95, 1900–01, 1902–03, 2002–03, 2005–06, 2010–11

Birmingham Senior Cup: 2

- Winners: 1901, 1914
- Runners-up: 1910, 1915, 1920, 1921

Isle of Man Trophy: 3

- Winners: 1987, 1991, 1992
- Runners-up: 1985

Bass Charity Vase: 5

- Winners: 1980, 1991, 1992, 1995, 1998
- Runners-up: 1890, 1894, 1990, 1996

== Player records ==
=== Appearances ===
- Most appearances in total (League & Cup) – 597 Eric Skeels (1959–76)
- Most League appearances – 507 Eric Skeels (1959–76)
- Most appearances in total (Including war-time) – 675 John McCue (1940–60)
- Most Consecutive Appearances – 148 Tony Allen (1960–63)
- Youngest Player – Emre Tezgel 16 years, 112 days v Leyton Orient 9 January 2022
- Oldest Player – Stanley Matthews 50 years, 5 days v Fulham 6 February 1965
- First Substitute – Keith Bebbington in 1965 who replaced Dennis Viollet
- Most Substitute Appearances For The Club – 98 Peter Crouch (2011–2019)

==== Top 20 most appearances ====
Rank	Name	Years	League	FA Cup	League Cup	Other	Total
1	(England) Eric Skeels	1960–1976	507	43	38	9	597
2	(England) John McCue	1946–1960	502	40	0	0	542
3	(Scotland) Bob McGrory	1921–1935	479	32	0	0	511
4	(England) Denis Smith	1968–1982	407	29	34	23	493
5	(England) Alan Bloor	1961–1978	388	38	37	19	482
6	(England) Peter Fox	1978–1993	409	22	32	14	477
7	(England) Tony Allen	1957–1970	417	30	26	0	473
8	(England) Ryan Shawcross	2007–2021	401	25	19	8	453
9	(England) Jackie Marsh	1967–1979	355	32	35	22	444
10	(England) Frank Bowyer	1948–1960	398	38	0	0	436
11	(England) Frank Mountford	1946–1958	391	34	0	0	425
12	(England) Alan Dodd	1972–1985	374	15	25	4	418
13	(England) John Sellars	1946–1958	384	29	0	0	413
14	(England) Harry Davies	1922–1938	389	22	0	0	411
15	(England) Harry Sellars	1923–1935	370	25	0	0	395
16	(England) Peter Dobing	1963–1973	307	22	40	8	377
17	(England) Stanley Matthews	1932–1965	318	37	0	0	355
18	(England) Billy Spencer	1925–1938	338	16	0	0	354
19	(England) John Ritchie	1962–1974	269	27	38	17	351
20	(England) Harry Oscroft	1950–1959	326	23	0	0	349

=== Goalscoring ===
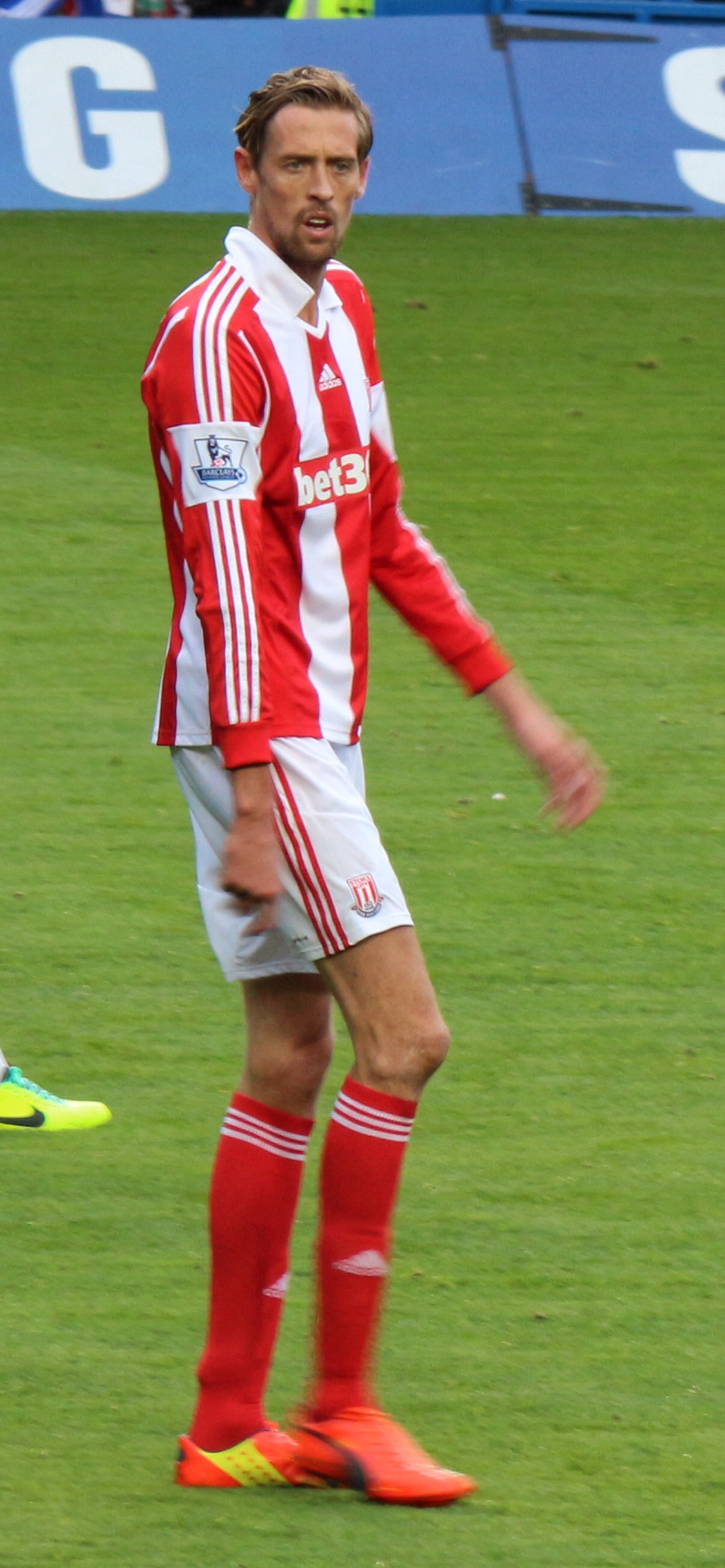
Peter Crouch scored a record 44 Premier League goals for Stoke between 2011 and 2019

- Leading Goalscorer (League & Cup) – 176 John Ritchie (1963–75)
- Leading Goalscorer (League only) – 140 Freddie Steele (1934–49)
- Leading Goalscorer (Including war-time) – 282 Tommy Sale (1930–47)
- Leading Goalscorer (FA Cup) – 19 Freddie Steele
- Leading Goalscorer (League Cup) – 18 John Ritchie
- Leading Goalscorer (Premier League only) – 45 Peter Crouch
- Most Goals In a Season – 38 Charlie Wilson & Arthur Griffiths
- Most Goals In a Season (League only) – 33 Freddie Steele
- Most Goals In a single match – 7 Neville Coleman v Lincoln City 23 February 1957
- Most matches Scored In Consecutively – 7 (7 Goals) Mike Sheron

==== Top 20 overall goalscorers ====
Rank	Name	Years	League	FA Cup	League Cup	Other	Total
1	(England) John Ritchie	1962–1974	135	15	18	8	176
2	(England) Freddie Steele	1933–1949	140	19	0	0	159
3	(England) Frank Bowyer	1948–1960	137	12	0	0	149
4	(England) Charlie Wilson	1925–1930	112	8	0	0	120
5	(England) Johnny King	1953–1961	106	7	0	0	113
6	(England) Harry Oscroft	1950–1959	103	4	0	0	107
7=	(England) Jimmy Greenhoff	1969–1976	76	11	9	6	103
7=	(England) Tommy Sale	1930–1949	98	5	0	0	103
8	(England) Harry Davies	1922–1937	92	9	0	0	101
9	(England) Peter Dobing	1963–1973	82	3	9	1	95
10	(England) Joe Schofield	1891–1899	81	8	0	5	92
11	(Scotland) William Maxwell	1895–1900	74	10	0	1	85
12	(England) Peter Thorne	1997–2001	65	0	6	9	80
13	(England) Harry Burrows	1965–1973	68	5	3	0	76
14	(England) Arthur Watkin	1913–1925	61	13	0	0	74
15=	(England) Alf Smith	1903–1915	67	5	0	0	72
15=	(England) Mark Stein	1991–1997	54	0	8	10	72
16=	(England) Jimmy Broad	1921–1924	62	5	0	0	67
16=	(Republic of Ireland) Terry Conroy	1967–1979	49	8	8	2	67
17	(England) Dennis Viollet	1962–1967	59	4	3	0	66
18	(England) Bobby Liddle	1928–1938	61	3	0	0	64
19	(England) Wayne Biggins	1989–1995	52	0	4	7	63
20=	(England) Peter Crouch	2011–2019	46	5	9	2	62
20=	(England) Stanley Matthews	1932–1965	54	8	0	0	62
20=	(England) William Smith	1909–1913	57	3	0	2	62
20=	(Republic of Ireland) Jonathan Walters	2010–2017	43	11	6	2	62

=== Internationals ===
- Most capped player – 81 Glenn Whelan
- First player to be capped – Edward Johnson for England 1880
- First Scottish player to be capped – Tommy Hyslop 1896
- First Welsh player to be capped – Mart Watkins 1902
- First Irish player to be capped – James Sheridan 1905

=== Transfers ===
- Record transfer fee paid – £18.3 million to Porto for Giannelli Imbula February 2016
- Record transfer fee received – £20 million from West Ham United for Marko Arnautović July 2017

==== Progression of record fee paid ====
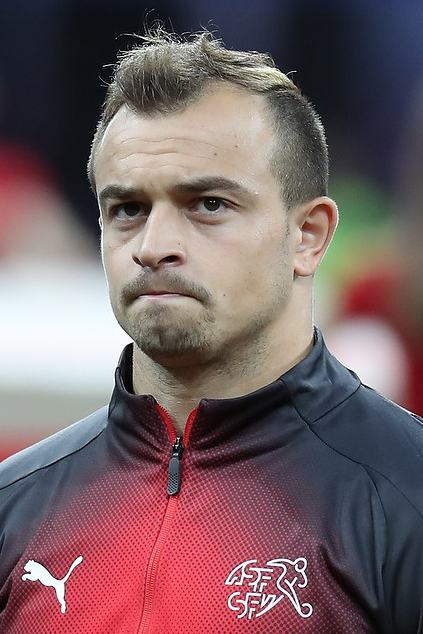
Xherdan Shaqiri cost Stoke £12 million in August 2015

Date	Player	Bought from	Fee
September 1894	(England) George Clawley	Crewe Alexandra	£10
August 1897	(Scotland) Jimmy McGeachan	Bolton Wanderers	£150
March 1903	(England) Ted Holdcroft	Burslem Port Vale	£500
August 1919	(Scotland) David Brown	Dundee	£1,200
August 1921	(England) Jimmy Broad	Millwall	£2,500
August 1929	(England) Wilf Kirkham	Port Vale	£2,800
March 1933	(England) Jack Palethorpe	Reading	£3,000
August 1938	(Scotland) Patrick Gallacher	Sunderland	£5,000
August 1947	(Northern Ireland) Jimmy McAlinden	Portsmouth	£7,000
August 1947	(Scotland) Tommy Kiernan	Celtic	£8,500
October 1949	(Scotland) Leslie Johnston	Celtic	£9,000
August 1951	(England) Alan Martin	Port Vale	£10,000
August 1951	(Northern Ireland) Sammy Smyth	Wolverhampton Wanderers	£25,000
August 1962	(England) Eddie Clamp	Arsenal	£35,000
August 1963	(England) Peter Dobing	Manchester City	£37,500
March 1965	(Wales) Roy Vernon	Everton	£40,000
April 1967	(England) Gordon Banks	Leicester City	£52,000
August 1969	(England) Jimmy Greenhoff	Birmingham City	£100,000
January 1974	(England) Alan Hudson	Chelsea	£240,000
November 1974	(England) Peter Shilton	Leicester City	£325,000
February 1982	(Northern Ireland) Sammy McIlroy	Manchester United	£350,000
July 1989	(England) Ian Cranson	Sheffield Wednesday	£480,000
August 1994	(Canada) Paul Peschisolido	Birmingham City	£580,000
December 1999	(Iceland) Brynjar Gunnarsson	Örgryte IS	£600,000
August 2005	(Guinea) Sambégou Bangoura	Standard Liège	£900,000
January 2008	(England) Ryan Shawcross	Manchester United	£1,000,000
January 2008	(England) Leon Cort	Crystal Palace	£1,200,000
August 2008	(England) Dave Kitson	Reading	£5,500,000
August 2009	(Germany) Robert Huth	Middlesbrough	£6,000,000
August 2010	(Trinidad and Tobago) Kenwyne Jones	Sunderland	£8,000,000
August 2011	(England) Peter Crouch	Tottenham Hotspur	£10,000,000
August 2015	(Switzerland) Xherdan Shaqiri	Inter Milan	£12,000,000
February 2016	(France) Giannelli Imbula	Porto	£18,300,000

==== Progression of record fee received ====
Date	Player	Sold to	Fee
November 1966	(England) John Ritchie	Sheffield Wednesday	£70,000
May 1972	(England) Mike Bernard	Everton	£120,000
December 1976	(England) Alan Hudson	Arsenal	£225,000
September 1977	(England) Peter Shilton	Nottingham Forest	£250,000
July 1980	(England) Garth Crooks	Tottenham Hotspur	£600,000
January 1982	(England) Adrian Heath	Everton	£700,000
October 1989	(England) Peter Beagrie	Everton	£750,000
November 1993	(England) Mark Stein	Chelsea	£1,500,000
July 1997	(England) Mike Sheron	Queens Park Rangers	£2,750,000
August 2009	(Nigeria) Seyi Olofinjana	Hull City	£3,000,000
January 2011	(Turkey) Tuncay	VfL Wolfsburg	£4,500,000
July 2015	(France) Steven Nzonzi	Sevilla	£7,000,000
July 2015	(Bosnia and Herzegovina) Asmir Begović	Chelsea	£8,000,000
July 2017	(Austria) Marko Arnautović	West Ham United	£20,000,000

=== All-Time XI & Hall of Fame members ===
In the final match of the 2012–13 season, as part of the club's official celebration of their 150th anniversary, supporters cast votes to determine the greatest ever Stoke City team.

- (England) Gordon Banks (1967–72)
- (England) Jackie Marsh (1967–79)
- (England) Ryan Shawcross (2007–21)
- (England) Denis Smith (1968–82)
- (England) Mike Pejic (1968–76)
- (England) Stanley Matthews (1932–47) & (1961–65)
- (England) Alan Hudson (1974–76) & (1984–85)
- (England) Jimmy Greenhoff (1969–76)
- (Netherlands) Peter Hoekstra (2001–04)
- (England) Mark Stein (1991–93) & (1996–97)
- (Jamaica) Ricardo Fuller (2006–12)

Bench

- (Bosnia and Herzegovina) Asmir Begović (2010–2015)
- (England) Lee Dixon (1986–88)
- (England) Neil Franklin (1939–50)
- (Republic of Ireland) Terry Conroy (1967–79)
- (England) John Ritchie (1962–66) & (1969–75)

Manager

- (England) Tony Waddington (1960–77)

English Football Hall of Fame members

A number of Stoke City players have been inducted into the English Football Hall of Fame:

- (England) Gordon Banks (2002 inductee)
- (England) Stanley Matthews (2002 inductee)
- (England) Peter Shilton (2002 inductee)
- (England) Geoff Hurst (2004 inductee)

Football League 100 Legends

The Football League 100 Legends is a list of "100 legendary football players" produced by The Football League in 1998, to celebrate the 100th season of League football.

- (England) Gordon Banks
- (England) Neil Franklin
- (England) Geoff Hurst
- (England) Stanley Matthews
- (Northern Ireland) Jimmy McIlroy
- (England) Peter Shilton
- (Wales) Neville Southall

=== PFA Team of the Year ===
The following have been included in the PFA Team of the Year whilst playing for Stoke :

- 1975 (England) Peter Shilton, (England) Alan Hudson (1st tier)
- 1976 (England) Alan Hudson (1st tier)
- 1979 (England) Mike Doyle, (England) Howard Kendall (2nd tier)
- 1986 (England) Keith Bertschin (2nd tier)
- 1986 (England) Lee Dixon (2nd tier)
- 1991 (England) Wayne Biggins (3rd tier)
- 1992 (England) Vince Overson, (England) Wayne Biggins (3rd tier)
- 1993 (England) Vince Overson, (England) Mark Stein (3rd tier)
- 1997 (England) Mike Sheron (2nd tier)
- 1999 (Republic of Ireland) Graham Kavanagh (3rd tier)
- 2000 (Republic of Ireland) Graham Kavanagh (3rd tier)
- 2001 (Republic of Ireland) Graham Kavanagh (3rd tier)
- 2008 (England) Ryan Shawcross, (Republic of Ireland) Liam Lawrence, (Jamaica) Ricardo Fuller (2nd tier)

== Managerial records ==
- First full-time manager: Thomas Slaney who was in charge for nine years (1874 to 1883)
- Longest serving manager: Tony Waddington 17 years (764 matches) (June 1960 to March 1977)

== Team records ==
=== Matches ===
- First recorded match: Stoke Ramblers 1–1 E.W Mays XV, Friendly, 17 October 1868
- First match at the Victoria Ground: Stoke 2–1 Talke Rangers, Friendly, 28 March 1878
- First FA Cup match: Stoke 1–2 Manchester, First Round, 10 November 1883
- First Football League match: Stoke 0–2 West Bromwich Albion, 8 September 1888
- First League Cup match: Stoke City 1–3 Doncaster Rovers, Second Round, 18 October 1960
- First European match: Stoke City 3–1 Kaiserslautern, First Round, 13 September 1972
- Last match at Victoria Ground: Stoke City 2–1 West Bromwich Albion, Division One, 4 May 1997
- First match at the Britannia Stadium: Stoke City 1–1 Rochdale, League Cup, 1st Round 2nd Leg, 27 August 1997
- First League match at the Britannia Stadium: Stoke City 1–2 Swindon Town, Division One, 30 August 1997
- First match in the Premier League: Bolton Wanderers 3–1 Stoke City, 18 August 2008

==== Record wins ====
- Record win: 26–0 v Mow Cop, Staffordshire Senior Cup, 1877
- Record League Win: 10–3 v West Bromwich Albion, First Division, 4 February 1937
- Record Premier League Win: 6–1 v Liverpool, 24 May 2015
- Record FA Cup Win: 11–0 v Stourbridge, First Round, 26 September 1914
- Record League Cup Win: 6–2 v Chelsea, Third Round, 22 October 1974
- Record home Win: 9–0 v Plymouth Argyle, Second Division, 17 December 1960
- Record away Win: 6–0 v Bury, Second Division, 13 March 1954

==== Record defeats ====
- Record League defeat: 0–10 v Preston North End, Football League, 14 September 1889
- Record Premier League defeat: 0–7 v Chelsea, Premier League, 25 April 2010
- Record FA Cup defeat: 0–8 v Wolverhampton Wanderers, Quarter Final, 22 February 1890
- Record League Cup defeat: 0–8 v Liverpool, Fourth Round, 24 November 2000
- Record home defeat: 0–7 v Birmingham City, First Division, 10 January 1998
- Record away defeat: 0–10 v Preston North End, Football League, 14 September 1889

==== Sequences ====
- Longest sequence of League wins: 8 (30 March 1895 – 21 September 1895)
- Longest sequence of League defeats: 11 (6 April 1985 – 17 August 1985)
- Longest sequence of League draws: 5 (1 September 1973 – 15 September 1973), (21 March 1987 – 11 April 1987), (12 August 2006 – 12 September 2006)
- Longest unbeaten run: 25 (5 September 1992 – 20 February 1993)
- Longest run without a win: 17 (15 September 1984 – 22 December 1984), (22 April 1989 – 14 October 1989)
- Longest run without a draw: 46 (30 March 1895 – 14 November 1896)
- Longest successive scoring run: 21 (24 December 1921 – 22 April 1922)
- Longest successive non-scoring run: 8 (29 December 1984 – 16 March 1985)
- Longest run without a clean sheet: 34 (22 December 1888 – 3 October 1891)
- Longest run of clean sheets: 7 (6 November 2006 – 9 December 2006) achieved by Steve Simonsen

==== Attendances ====
- Record League attendance at the Victoria Ground: 51,380 v Arsenal, 29 March 1937
- Record FA Cup attendance at the Victoria Ground: 50,736 v Bolton Wanderers, 2 March 1946
- Record League attendance at the bet365 Stadium: 30,022 v Everton (17 March 2018)
- Record League Cup attendance at the bet365 Stadium: 27,109 v Liverpool, 29 November 2000
- Record FA Cup attendance at the bet365 Stadium: 28,218 v Everton, 5 January 2002
- Record away attendance: 84,569 v Manchester City 3 March 1934
