= Edward Rayner =

English footballer (1932–2022)

Personal information
- Full name: Albert Edward Rayner
- Date of birth: 13 August 1932
- Place of birth: Salford, England
- Date of death: 5 April 2022 (aged 89)
- Place of death: Haslington, England
- Position: Midfielder

Senior career*
| Years | Team | Apps | (Gls) |
| 1954–1955 | Radcliffe Borough | | |
| 1955–1956 | Northwich Victoria | | |
| 1956–1960 | Stoke City | 4 | (0) |
| 1960–1961 | Chelmsford City | | |
| 1961–1962 | Macclesfield Town | 51 | (0) |
| 1962–1964 | Hyde United | 39 | (4) |
- * Club domestic league appearances and goals

Albert Edward Rayner (13 August 1932 – 5 April 2022) was an English footballer who played in the Football League for Stoke City.

== Early life ==
Rayner was born in Salford and played for Radcliffe Borough and Northwich Victoria before joining Stoke City in 1956.

== Career ==
Rayner spent four years at the Victoria Ground being used as a back-up, making just four appearances. He later played for Chelmsford City, Macclesfield Town and Hyde United.

== Career statistics ==
Appearances and goals by club, season and competition
| Club | Season | League | | | FA Cup | | Other | | Total | |
| Club | Season | Division | Apps | Goals | Apps | Goals | Apps | Goals | Apps | Goals |
|---|---|---|---|---|---|---|---|---|---|---|
| Stoke City | 1956–57 | Second Division | 2 | 0 | 0 | 0 | — | | 2 | 0 |
| Stoke City | 1957–58 | Second Division | 0 | 0 | 0 | 0 | — | | 0 | 0 |
| Stoke City | 1958–59 | Second Division | 0 | 0 | 0 | 0 | — | | 0 | 0 |
| Stoke City | 1959–60 | Second Division | 2 | 0 | 0 | 0 | — | | 2 | 0 |
| Stoke City | Total | | 4 | 0 | 0 | 0 | — | | 4 | 0 |
| Macclesfield Town | 1961–62 | Cheshire League | 42 | 0 | 1 | 0 | 6 | 0 | 49 | 0 |
| Macclesfield Town | 1962–63 | Cheshire League | 9 | 0 | 1 | 0 | 2 | 0 | 12 | 0 |
| Macclesfield Town | Total | | 51 | 0 | 2 | 0 | 8 | 0 | 61 | 0 |
| Career total | | | 55 | 0 | 2 | 0 | 8 | 0 | 65 | 0 |
