= Derrick Ward (footballer) =

English footballer

Personal information
- Full name: Derrick Ward
- Date of birth: 23 December 1934
- Place of birth: Stoke-on-Trent, England
- Date of death: 11 October 2011 (aged 76)
- Place of death: Bentilee, Stoke-on-Trent, England
- Position: Forward

Senior career*
Years	Team	Apps	(Gls)
1952–1961	Stoke City	54	(9)
1961–1964	Stockport County	81	(21)
Total		135	(30)
- * Club domestic league appearances and goals

Derrick Ward (23 December 1934 – 11 October 2011) was a footballer who played in the Football League for Stockport County and Stoke City. He made fifty four appearances for Stoke.

== Career ==
Born in Stoke-on-Trent Ward started his career at his local club Stoke City where he made his debut in the 1952–53 season. He was a bit part player at Stoke due Frank Bowyer and Bobby Howitt occupying Ward's position. He became more involved with the first team in the 1958–59 season where he made 17 appearances however he was allowed by manager Tony Waddington to join Stockport County in 1961. Ward went on to spend three years at Edgeley Park making 81 league appearances scoring 21 goals.

== Personal life ==
His brother Terry was also a footballer who played for Stoke he however died when he was 23. Ward died on 11 October 2011 at the age of 76.

== Career statistics ==
Club	Season	League			FA Cup		League Cup		Total	
Club	Season	Division	Apps	Goals	Apps	Goals	Apps	Goals	Apps	Goals
Stoke City	1952–53	First Division	2	0	0	0	–		2	0
Stoke City	1953–54	Second Division	0	0	0	0	–		0	0
Stoke City	1954–55	Second Division	3	0	1	0	–		4	0
Stoke City	1955–56	Second Division	5	1	0	0	–		5	1
Stoke City	1956–57	Second Division	3	0	0	0	–		3	0
Stoke City	1957–58	Second Division	0	0	0	0	–		0	0
Stoke City	1958–59	Second Division	15	4	2	0	–		17	4
Stoke City	1959–60	Second Division	9	2	0	0	–		9	2
Stoke City	1960–61	Second Division	17	2	3	0	1	0	21	2
Stoke City	Total		54	9	6	0	1	0	61	9
Stockport County	1961–62	Fourth Division	44	14	1	0	1	0	46	14
Stockport County	1962–63	Fourth Division	25	7	1	0	0	0	26	7
Stockport County	1963–64	Fourth Division	12	0	0	0	0	0	12	0
Stockport County	Total		81	21	2	0	1	0	84	21
Career Total			135	30	8	0	2	0	145	30
