= Andy Graver =

English footballer (1927–2014)

Personal information
- Full name: Andrew Martin Graver
- Date of birth: 12 September 1927
- Place of birth: Craghead, England
- Date of death: 18 January 2014 (aged 86)
- Place of death: York, England
- Position: Centre forward

Youth career
- –: Quaking House Juniors

Senior career*
Years	Team	Apps	(Gls)
–	Willington		
–	Annfield Plain		
1949–1950	Newcastle United	1	(0)
1950–1954	Lincoln City	170	(106)
1954–1955	Leicester City	11	(3)
1955	Lincoln City	15	(4)
1955–1957	Stoke City	37	(12)
1957–1958	Boston United	46	(31)
1958–1961	Lincoln City	89	(33)
1961–1962	Skegness Town		
1962–1964	Ilkeston Town		(18)
Total		369	(189)
- * Club domestic league appearances and goals

Andrew Martin Graver (12 September 1927 – 18 January 2014) was an English footballer who scored 158 goals from 323 games playing in the Football League for Newcastle United, Lincoln City, Leicester City and Stoke City.

Graver is Lincoln City's all-time leading scorer, and topped the poll as the club's supporters voted for their "100 League Legends". He spent three separate spells with Lincoln, interspersed with big-money transfers to Leicester City and Stoke City and appearances for Boston United in the Midland League and Southern League. He finished his career in non-League football with Skegness Town and Ilkeston Town.

== Football career ==
Graver was born in 1927 in Craghead, County Durham. His father, Fred, played professional football in the 1920s. He worked as a coal miner while playing for Willington and then for Annfield Plain. He signed for Newcastle United as a professional footballer before the 1947–48 season, and played regularly for the reserve team in the Central League, but his only game for Newcastle's first team came on 21 January 1950, standing in for the injured Jackie Milburn in a First Division match at home to Manchester City which finished 1–1. In September 1950, Lincoln City manager Bill Anderson persuaded the player to sign for the Third Division club for a fee of £5,000.

In his first season at Lincoln Graver scored 20 goals in League and FA Cup, losing out as leading scorer by one goal to Johnny Garvie. The following year, Garvie again scored 21 goals, but Graver's 39 (36 in the League from only 35 games) not only made him the club's top scorer but made a major contribution to Lincoln winning the Third Division North title and promotion to the Second Division. Graver scored 36 goals from only 35 games in 1951–52, including a double hat-trick (six goals) – two scored with his right foot, two with his left, and two headers – as Lincoln beat Crewe Alexandra 11–1. He injured a cartilage later that season so was unable to accept an invitation to appear for the England B team. Graver was Lincoln's top scorer for the next two seasons, with 18 and 25 goals respectively.

Described in his club profile as "fast, direct, and above all a fine opportunist in front of goal", Graver soon attracted attention from other clubs. Early on in his Lincoln career the club rejected an offer of £12,500 from Norwich City for his services. Nottingham Forest made several bids for the player. In December 1954, he signed for First Division strugglers Leicester City for a fee of £27,500 plus the player Eric Littler, valued at £600, a Leicester City club record, and little below the £30,000 paid by Tottenham Hotspur for Northern Ireland international and Aston Villa captain Danny Blanchflower not long before. Graver, described as "reluctantly" leaving Lincoln, said he was "afraid of the responsibility of living up to such a price tag".

Playing alongside Leicester's record goalscorer Arthur Rowley, Graver scored in his first two games, but produced little more as the club failed to avoid relegation. Lincoln paid £14,000 for Graver's return, but a few months later he moved on again, this time to Second Division Stoke City for a "large" fee. He had less success at Stoke, producing 12 goals from 37 League games over a season and a half. In August 1957, expectation was that he would return again to Lincoln; terms were agreed between the clubs, but Boston United – where his brother Alf was already playing – made the player a better contract offer. Not only did Boston pay a Midland League record fee of £3,500 for Graver, they also signed Johnny Garvie from Carlisle United with the intention of reviving their previous goalscoring partnership.

Graver provided 24 League goals in the 1957–58 season as Boston finished in third place in the Midland League. He remained with the club as they began their 1958 campaign in the Southern League, scoring at a goal a game, before returning to Lincoln City for his third spell. He stayed with Lincoln until the end of the 1960–61 season, bringing his goals total to 150 from 289 games in all competitions and establishing his position as Lincoln's all-time top scorer. After retiring from full-time football, he played for Skegness Town and then for Ilkeston Town, where he was reunited with Garvie yet again. However, injury restricted Garvie to five appearances, and although Graver's 16 goals made him leading scorer in 1962–63, and contributed to a fourth-place finish in the Midland Counties League and a Derbyshire Senior Cup-winner's medal, he was soon dropped to the reserves, where a broken ankle brought about his retirement as a player. He had scored 19 goals from 48 appearances in all first-team competitions for Ilkeston.

During the 1960s, Graver coached Lincoln City's youth team. He worked for a finance company in the Lincoln area for 30 years, and lived locally after retiring. Graver and 1950s teammate Tony Emery were the first two former players admitted to the club's Hall of Fame in May 1996. In 2006, Graver topped the poll as Lincoln fans voted for "100 League Legends" as part of the celebrations of the club's 100th season in the Football League. The following year, to mark the centenary of the Professional Footballers' Association (PFA), supporters were asked to vote for their club's all-time favourite player; Graver was again the Lincoln City choice.

He moved to York in later life to be nearer family, and died there in 2014, aged 86.

== Career statistics ==
Appearances and goals by club, season and competition
Club	Season	League			FA Cup		Total	
Club	Season	Division	Apps	Goals	Apps	Goals	Apps	Goals
Newcastle United	1949–50	First Division	1	0	0	0	1	0
Lincoln City	1950–51	Third Division North	37	19	2	1	39	20
Lincoln City	1951–52	Third Division North	35	36	3	3	38	39
Lincoln City	1952–53	Second Division	40	18	2	0	42	18
Lincoln City	1953–54	Second Division	40	24	4	1	44	25
Lincoln City	1954–55	Second Division	18	9	0	0	18	9
Lincoln City	Total		170	106	11	5	181	111
Leicester City	1954–55	First Division	11	3	1	0	12	3
Lincoln City	1955–56	Second Division	15	4	0	0	15	4
Stoke City	1955–56	Second Division	24	7	5	2	29	9
Stoke City	1956–57	Second Division	13	5	0	0	13	5
Stoke City	Total		37	12	5	2	42	14
Lincoln City	1958–59	Second Division	29	13	0	0	29	13
Lincoln City	1959–60	Second Division	29	12	2	0	31	12
Lincoln City	1960–61	Second Division	31	8	2	2	33	10
Lincoln City	Total		89	33	4	2	93	35
Career total			323	158	21	9	344	167

== Honours ==
Lincoln City

- Football League Third Division North champion: 1951–52
