= Bill Asprey =

English football player and manager (1936–2025)

Personal information
- Full name: William Asprey
- Date of birth: 11 September 1936
- Place of birth: Wolverhampton, England
- Date of death: 25 May 2025 (aged 88)
- Place of death: Jersey, Channel Islands
- Height: 6 ft 1 in (1.85 m)
- Position: Defender

Youth career
- Wolverhampton Wanderers

Senior career*
Years	Team	Apps	(Gls)
1953–1966	Stoke City	304	(23)
1966–1967	Oldham Athletic	80	(4)
1967–1968	Port Vale	31	(0)
Total		415	(27)

Managerial career
- 1975–1977: Rhodesia
- 1979–1980: Oxford United
- 1980–1982: Syria
- 1983–1985: Stoke City
- 1989–1990: Iraq U23
- 1992: ATM
- * Club domestic league appearances and goals

William Asprey (11 September 1936 – 25 May 2025) was an English football player and manager. A defender, he made 418 league appearances in a 15-year career in the Football League. He then had a 25-year career as a coach.

Asprey spent 1953 to 1965 at Stoke City, making 341 appearances in all competitions. He helped the "Potters" to the Second Division title in 1962–63 and also played in the 1964 League Cup final. He spent 1965 to December 1967 at Oldham Athletic before he was sold to Port Vale for a £2,000 fee. He left the "Valiants" in December 1968 to become a full-time coach.

He coached at various clubs across the world, as well as the national teams of Rhodesia and Syria. He was given his first chance as a manager in England at Oxford United in July 1979. He was not overly successful and was sacked in December 1980. He returned to Stoke City as manager in December 1983 but was sacked in April 1985 after leading the club to the bottom of the First Division.

== Playing career ==
=== Stoke City ===
Born in Wolverhampton, Asprey joined Stoke City on amateur terms from his local club Wolverhampton Wanderers in May 1953. He made his first-team debut in the 1953–54 season under the management of Frank Taylor after turning professional at the age of 17. He played a further three Second Division games in 1955–56, before making nine appearances in 1956–57, and then breaking into the first-team with 28 appearances in 1957–58. He scored his first senior goal on 9 September 1957 in a 5–3 home defeat to Bristol Rovers. He made 44 appearances in the 1958–59 campaign, scoring six goals, including one in a 4–3 win over Liverpool at Anfield. During the campaign, he played in five positions: right-back, right-half, centre-half, inside-right and inside-left. He played 38 times in 1959–60, before new manager Tony Waddington began to play him in an attacking role in 1960–61. During the campaign, he scored seven goals in 40 games, scoring twice in a 9–0 thrashing of Plymouth Argyle and hitting a hat-trick past Charlton Athletic in a 5–3 home win on 16 January 1961. He made 47 appearances in 1961–62, scoring four goals.

The "Potters" were crowned champions of the Second Division in 1962–63, and Asprey was a vital part of the club's success, making 44 appearances in league and cup competitions. He played at right full-back behind Stanley Matthews on the wing. He was limited to 29 First Division appearances in 1963–64, but managed to pick up a League Cup runners-up medal. In the first leg of the final, his 30 yards (27 m) shot was parried by Leicester City goalkeeper Gordon Banks, and Keith Bebbington put the loose ball into the net. Stoke drew 1–1 at the Victoria Ground, but lost the encounter at Filbert Street 3–2. Asprey posted 43 appearances in 1964–65, but featured just twice in 1965–66. In total, he played 341 league and cup games for the club.

=== Oldham Athletic ===
Asprey moved on to Oldham Athletic after former Stoke teammate turned newly appointed Oldham manager Jimmy McIlroy purchased him for a £19,000 fee in January 1966. Oldham finished the 1965–66 season just one place and one point above the Third Division relegation zone. The "Latics" rose to tenth in 1966–67 in McIlroy's first full season as manager. Asprey made 83 league appearances during his time at Boundary Park.

=== Port Vale ===
Asprey was purchased by Port Vale for a £2,000 fee in December 1967. He made 22 Fourth Division appearances under "Valiants" manager (and former Stoke teammate) Stanley Matthews in 1967–68, but featured just eleven times in 1968–69 under new boss Gordon Lee. He departed Vale Park when he retired as a player in December 1968, at the age of 32.

== Style of play ==
Asprey was versatile and appeared in almost every outfield position for Stoke. He made most of his appearances at full-back, despite his tall and heavy frame (6 ft 1 in (1.85 m) and 12 stone (170 lb; 76 kg)). He was noted for his tough-tackling ability.

== Coaching career ==
After retiring from playing, Asprey joined Sheffield Wednesday's coaching staff in February 1969. In February 1970 he joined Coventry City as Noel Cantwell's assistant. In a training session at Highfield Road he came up with the idea of the famous donkey-kick free-kick routine that was executed by Willie Carr and scored by Ernie Hunt in a league game against Everton in October 1970. This was immediately outlawed due to the fact the ball was touched twice. In 1972, he joined Don Howe at West Bromwich Albion. He later coached at Wolverhampton Wanderers before taking charge of the Rhodesian National Team from May 1975 to January 1978.

=== Oxford United ===
Asprey was appointed manager of Oxford United in July 1979, and led the club to 17th in the Third Division in 1979–80. He was sacked in December 1980, and Oxford finished the 1980–81 season in 14th place under the stewardship of Ian Greaves. In December 1980, Asprey was appointed coach to the Syria national team.

=== Stoke City ===
Asprey returned to Stoke City as assistant manager to Richie Barker in February 1982, whom he succeeded in December 1983. Barker had installed the new tactical idea of 'Position of Maximum Opportunity' despite not having the players to suit the system, as he bypassed the team's strongest area in midfield, and he left the club with just three wins in 24 games. Asprey was initially successful in keeping Stoke from relegation in 1983–84 after he spent "almost every penny that the club had left in the bank" to sign a 32-year-old Alan Hudson from Chelsea for £22,500. With Hudson as Stoke's new talisman, the Potters won eight games in twelve matches, including a victory over eventual champions Liverpool. Having initially been appointed caretaker manager, Asprey was given a two-year contract after this success.

However, his transfer dealings left the Potters unable to compete in the 1984–85 season, and he was sacked in April, with the club bottom of the First Division with just three wins all season. Financial constraints, however, had left him without an assistant, trainer or physiotherapist at the start of the season. An injury crisis and outbreak of flu had also taken its toll on the squad. He took three weeks off in the new year as the young team's awful form instigated chest pains and ill health. Asprey bemoaned the club's lack of finances, saying that "there are certain areas which are not really professional and these have to change". Chairman Frank Edwards commented upon the sacking by saying "we felt that he was heading for another health breakdown and it was in his own interests to suspend him but, by his comments since, he has effectively sacked himself".

=== Later career ===
After a break from football, he took the Olympic Team Position in Iraq, leaving before the Gulf War in 1990. Later that year, he joined the Malaysian team ATM and then moved on to coach in Bahrain. Asprey retired from football and moved to Jersey in 1993. He died in May 2025 at the age of 88.

== Death ==
Asprey died in Jersey, in the Channel Islands on 25 May 2025, at the age of 88.

== Playing statistics ==
Appearances and goals by club, season and competition
Club	Season	League			FA Cup		League Cup		Total	
Club	Season	Division	Apps	Goals	Apps	Goals	Apps	Goals	Apps	Goals
Stoke City	1953–54	Second Division	1	0	0	0	–		1	0
Stoke City	1954–55	Second Division	0	0	0	0	–		0	0
Stoke City	1955–56	Second Division	3	0	0	0	–		3	0
Stoke City	1956–57	Second Division	9	0	0	0	–		9	0
Stoke City	1957–58	Second Division	28	1	0	0	–		28	1
Stoke City	1958–59	Second Division	42	5	2	1	–		44	6
Stoke City	1959–60	Second Division	36	1	2	0	–		38	1
Stoke City	1960–61	Second Division	35	6	4	1	1	0	40	7
Stoke City	1961–62	Second Division	42	4	3	0	2	0	47	4
Stoke City	1962–63	Second Division	42	5	1	0	1	0	44	5
Stoke City	1963–64	First Division	29	1	4	0	9	1	42	2
Stoke City	1964–65	First Division	35	0	3	0	5	0	43	0
Stoke City	1965–66	First Division	2	0	0	0	0	0	2	0
Stoke City	Total		304	23	19	2	18	1	341	26
Oldham Athletic	1965–66	Third Division	26	1	2	0	0	0	28	1
Oldham Athletic	1966–67	Third Division	36	2	4	1	1	0	41	3
Oldham Athletic	1967–68	Third Division	18	1	0	0	3	0	21	1
Oldham Athletic	Total		80	4	6	1	4	0	90	5
Port Vale	1967–68	Fourth Division	22	0	0	0	0	0	22	0
Port Vale	1968–69	Fourth Division	9	0	1	0	1	0	11	0
Port Vale	Total		31	0	1	0	1	0	33	0
Career total			415	27	26	3	23	1	464	31

== Managerial statistics ==
Managerial record by team and tenure
Team	From	To	Record				
Team	From	To	P	W	D	L	Win %
Oxford United	22 July 1979	1 December 1980	70	20	20	30	28.6
Stoke City	9 December 1983	15 April 1985	64	14	15	35	21.9
Total			134	34	35	65	25.4

== Honours ==
Stoke City

- Football League Second Division: 1962–63
- Football League Cup runner-up: 1963–64
