= John McCue (footballer) =

English footballer (1922–1999)

Personal information
- Full name: John William McCue
- Date of birth: 22 August 1922
- Place of birth: Stoke-on-Trent, England
- Date of death: 19 November 1999 (aged 77)
- Place of death: Stoke-on-Trent, England
- Position: Full back

Youth career
- 1937–1940: Longton Council School

Senior career*
Years	Team	Apps	(Gls)
1946–1960	Stoke City	502	(2)
1960–1962	Oldham Athletic	56	(0)
1962–1963	Macclesfield Town	7	(0)
Total		565	(2)

International career
	England B	1	(0)
- * Club domestic league appearances and goals

John William McCue (22 August 1922 – 19 November 1999) was an English footballer who played in the Football League for Oldham Athletic and Stoke City.

== Career ==
McCue was born in Stoke-on-Trent and was spotted playing for Longton schools and joined Stoke as an amateur in 1937. He signed professional forms in 1940 and due to his wartime occupation as a physical training instructor he remained local and made the left back spot his own from 1942–43 onwards, missing only one game from February 1943 to May 1945. The left-footed McCue's style was uncompromising, described as a 'grand kicker of the ball' and should an opposing winger get the better of him he would not averse the odd kick or two to rectify the situation. This earned him the nickname 'chopper' amongst his Stoke teammates. His impetuous tackling did lead to mistakes and a one such occasion McCue slipped as the attempted to tackle Sheffield United's Walter Rickett on the final day of the 1946–47 season, Stoke lost 2–1 and missed out on their first league title.

After being demobbed, McCue played as a part-time professional working for the British Coal Corporation as a PT instructor. He trained intensely on a Tuesday's and Thursday's and his regimes were very army orientated. By 1948 Stoke's team-spirit was beginning to fall apart, with the loss of the title in 1947 and the departure of Stanley Matthews coupled with a number of big-name transfer failings caused rumbles of discontent with manager Bob McGrory. McCue along with five other players handed in transfer requests, each of which was rejected but the downward spiral continued which led to Stoke being relegated in 1952–53.

Under new manager Frank Taylor McCue retained his consistency as he remained a vital part of the "Potters" team for seven seasons in the Second Division. He eventually gave way to the younger Tony Allen and ended his 23-year association with Stoke City in 1960 joining Oldham Athletic at the age of 35. By the time he left Stoke McCue had set a club record of appearances of 542 with 675 including war time appearances. But War League matches are considered unofficial and therefore he lies 2nd on Stoke's all-time appearance list. He ended his career with Fourth Division Oldham Athletic making 64 appearances under "Latics" manager Jack Rowley.

== Career statistics ==
Appearances and goals by club, season and competition
Club	Season	League			FA Cup		League Cup		Total	
Club	Season	Division	Apps	Goals	Apps	Goals	Apps	Goals	Apps	Goals
Stoke City	1945–46	—	—		8	0	—		8	0
Stoke City	1946–47	First Division	36	0	5	0	—		41	0
Stoke City	1947–48	First Division	23	0	0	0	—		23	0
Stoke City	1948–49	First Division	39	0	1	0	—		40	0
Stoke City	1949–50	First Division	35	0	0	0	—		35	0
Stoke City	1950–51	First Division	39	0	4	0	—		43	0
Stoke City	1951–52	First Division	42	1	4	0	—		46	1
Stoke City	1952–53	First Division	36	0	2	0	—		38	0
Stoke City	1953–54	Second Division	36	0	3	0	—		39	0
Stoke City	1954–55	Second Division	41	1	0	0	—		41	1
Stoke City	1955–56	Second Division	36	0	3	0	—		39	0
Stoke City	1956–57	Second Division	39	0	1	0	—		40	0
Stoke City	1957–58	Second Division	33	0	5	0	—		38	0
Stoke City	1958–59	Second Division	42	0	2	0	—		44	0
Stoke City	1959–60	Second Division	25	0	2	0	—		27	0
Stoke City	Total		502	2	40	0	—		542	2
Oldham Athletic	1960–61	Fourth Division	35	0	3	0	2	0	40	0
Oldham Athletic	1961–62	Fourth Division	21	0	3	0	0	0	24	0
Oldham Athletic	Total		56	0	6	0	2	0	64	0
Macclesfield Town	1962–63	Cheshire League	7	0	1	0	—		8	0
Career total			565	2	47	0	2	0	614	2
