= Bobby Cairns =

Scottish footballer

Personal information
- Full name: Robert Seggie Cairns
- Date of birth: 27 May 1929
- Place of birth: Glasgow, Scotland
- Date of death: 26 June 1998 (aged 69)
- Place of death: Stoke-on-Trent, England
- Position: Wing half

Senior career*
Years	Team	Apps	(Gls)
1946–1948	Royal Albert		
1949–1950	Third Lanark	2	(0)
1950–1953	Ayr United	53	(8)
1954–1961	Stoke City	175	(9)
1961–1963	Macclesfield Town	29	(1)
Total		259	(18)
- * Club domestic league appearances and goals

Robert Seggie "Bobby" Cairns (27 May 1929 – 26 June 1998) was a former Scottish footballer who played in the Football League for Stoke City.

== Career ==
Cairns began playing football with Royal Albert, Third Lanark and Ayr United. He joined Stoke City along with fellow Ayr United teammate Joe Hutton in 1953. He became a creative wing half for the "Potters" and was more of a playmaker than a goalscorer. He made almost 200 League and Cup appearances for Stoke in eight seasons at the Victoria Ground before leaving for non-league Macclesfield Town in 1961.

== Career statistics ==
Club	Season	League			FA Cup		Other		Total	
Club	Season	Division	Apps	Goals	Apps	Goals	Apps	Goals	Apps	Goals
Stoke City	1953–54	Second Division	5	0	0	0	—		5	0
Stoke City	1954–55	Second Division	18	0	6	0	—		24	0
Stoke City	1955–56	Second Division	33	2	5	0	—		38	2
Stoke City	1956–57	Second Division	36	5	1	0	—		37	5
Stoke City	1957–58	Second Division	20	0	5	2	—		25	2
Stoke City	1958–59	Second Division	29	1	2	0	—		31	1
Stoke City	1959–60	Second Division	28	1	2	0	—		30	1
Stoke City	1960–61	Second Division	6	0	0	0	—		6	0
Stoke City	Total		175	9	21	2	—		196	11
Macclesfield Town	1961–62	Cheshire League	29	1	2	0	6	0	37	1
Macclesfield Town	1962–63	Cheshire League	0	0	1	1	0	0	1	1
Macclesfield Town	Total		29	1	3	1	6	0	38	2
Career Total			204	10	24	3	6	0	234	13
