= Alec Acton =

English footballer

Personal information
- Full name: Alec Edward Acton
- Date of birth: 12 November 1938
- Place of birth: Billesdon, England
- Date of death: June 1994 (age 56)
- Place of death: Leicester, England
- Position: Defender

Youth career
- Leicester City

Senior career*
Years	Team	Apps	(Gls)
1955–1956	Stoke City	0	(0)
1958–1960	Stockport County	9	(0)
Total		9	(0)
- * Club domestic league appearances and goals

Alec Edward Acton (1938–1994) was an English professional footballer who played in the Football League as a defender for Stockport County.

== Career statistics ==
Appearances and goals by club, season and competition
Club	Season	League			FA Cup		Total	
Club	Season	Division	Apps	Goals	Apps	Goals	Apps	Goals
Stoke City	1956–57	Second Division	0	0	0	0	0	0
Stockport County	1958–59	Third Division	8	0	0	0	8	0
Stockport County	1959–60	Fourth Division	1	0	0	0	1	0
Career total			9	0	0	0	9	0
