= Terry Ward =

English footballer

Personal information
- Full name: Terence Ward
- Date of birth: 10 December 1939
- Place of birth: Stoke-on-Trent, England
- Date of death: 1963 (aged 23)
- Place of death: Stoke-on-Trent, England
- Position: Defender

Senior career*
| Years | Team | Apps | (Gls) |
| 1959–1963 | Stoke City | 43 | (0) |
- * Club domestic league appearances and goals

Terence "Terry" Ward (10 December 1939 – 1963) was an English footballer who played in the Football League for Stoke City along with his brother Derrick.

== Career ==
Ward was born in Stoke-on-Trent and joined the local Football League club Stoke City in 1959 where his brother Derrick had been since 1952. He made his debut during the 1959–60 season and broke into the squad in the following season playing in 29 matches. However it was around this time that Ward started to suffer from ill health and after two seasons of struggling to get into the side he decided to retire. Not long after he left the club his health problems escalated and he died at the age of 23.

== Career statistics ==
| Club | Season | League | | | FA Cup | | League Cup | | Total | |
| Club | Season | Division | Apps | Goals | Apps | Goals | Apps | Goals | Apps | Goals |
|---|---|---|---|---|---|---|---|---|---|---|
| Stoke City | 1959–60 | Second Division | 3 | 0 | 0 | 0 | – | | 3 | 0 |
| Stoke City | 1960–61 | Second Division | 27 | 0 | 1 | 0 | 1 | 0 | 29 | 0 |
| Stoke City | 1961–62 | Second Division | 4 | 0 | 0 | 0 | 0 | 0 | 4 | 0 |
| Stoke City | 1962–63 | Second Division | 9 | 0 | 0 | 0 | 1 | 0 | 10 | 0 |
| Career Total | | | 43 | 0 | 1 | 0 | 2 | 0 | 46 | 0 |
