= George Kelly (footballer) =

Scottish footballer

Personal information
- Full name: George Lawson Kelly
- Date of birth: 29 June 1933
- Place of birth: Aberdeen, Scotland
- Date of death: 26 October 1998 (aged 65)
- Place of death: Aberdeen, Scotland
- Position: Inside forward

Senior career*
Years	Team	Apps	(Gls)
–	Banks O' Dee		
1953–1955	Aberdeen	2	(0)
1955–1958	Stoke City	67	(35)
1958–1959	Cardiff City	8	(4)
1959–1960	Stockport County	34	(4)
Total		111	(43)
- * Club domestic league appearances and goals

George Lawson Kelly (29 June 1933 – 26 October 1998) was a Scottish footballer, who played in the Football League for Cardiff City, Stockport County and Stoke City.

== Career ==
Kelly started his career at his home town side Aberdeen before joining Stoke City in 1955. Kelly had a relatively short spell at the Victoria Ground but he managed to get a fine goal per game ratio of 35 goals in 67 games in the Second Division. He later joined Cardiff City but after the club made a poor start to the 1958–59 season, he lost his place in the side to Derek Tapscott and left to join Stockport County at the end of the season. After he retired from football, Kelly started playing tennis with Johnny King and the pair almost made the 1970 Wimbledon Championships.

== Career statistics ==
Club	Season	League			FA Cup		Total	
Club	Season	Division	Apps	Goals	Apps	Goals	Apps	Goals
Aberdeen	1953–54	Scottish Division One	1	0	0	0	1	0
Aberdeen	1954–55	Scottish Division One	0	0	0	0	0	0
Aberdeen	1955–56	Scottish Division One	1	0	0	0	1	0
Aberdeen	Total		2	0	0	0	2	0
Stoke City	1955–56	Second Division	4	0	0	0	4	0
Stoke City	1956–57	Second Division	30	13	1	0	31	13
Stoke City	1957–58	Second Division	33	22	5	2	38	24
Stoke City	Total		67	35	6	2	73	37
Cardiff City	1958–59	Second Division	8	4	0	0	8	4
Stockport County	1959–60	Fourth Division	34	4	1	0	35	4
Career Total			111	43	7	2	118	45
