= Neville Coleman (footballer) =

English footballer (1930–1981)

Personal information
- Full name: Neville James Coleman
- Date of birth: 29 January 1930
- Place of birth: Prescot, England
- Date of death: 1 January 1981 (aged 50)
- Place of death: Australia
- Position: Forward

Senior career*
Years	Team	Apps	(Gls)
1952	Gorleston		
1953–1958	Stoke City	114	(46)
1958–1961	Crewe Alexandra	73	(16)
Total		187	(62)
- * Club domestic league appearances and goals

Neville James "Tim" Coleman (29 January 1930 – 1 January 1981) was an English footballer who played in the Football League for Crewe Alexandra and Stoke City. He holds the record for most goals scored in a match by a Stoke City player (7).

== Career ==
Coleman was born on 29 January 1930, in Prescot, and joined Stoke City in 1953 as an amateur from Gorleston, Norfolk where he was completing his National Service at the local RAF base. Stoke helped Coleman secure his released from the services in January 1954 although rules meant he could not turn professional for a year. Despite initially being signed as a centre-forward to partner Frank Bowyer, manager Frank Taylor saw him as a right winger witch saw Coleman drop into the reserves to learn his new position. However a career ending injury to John Malkin in October 1956 handed Coleman his chance in the first team. He quickly became a key member of the Stoke team although an often frustrating one becoming notoriously inconstant. Whilst he lacked pace he was very difficult to dispossess.

In the 1956–57 season, Coleman hit a rich vain of form in-front of goal scoring 27 goals, including a hat-trick against Middlesbrough. On 23 February 1957 Stoke played Lincoln City at the Victoria Ground and Stoke won the match 8–0 with Coleman scoring a club record seven goals. Although he failed to find the net again thereafter. Coleman scored 14 goals in 37 games in 1957–58 before Taylor decided to sell Coleman to Crewe Alexandra in February 1959 for £1,000. He later worked for Rolls-Royce before emigrating to Australia.

== Career statistics ==
Appearances and goals by club, season and competition
Club	Season	League			FA Cup		League Cup		Total	
Club	Season	Division	Apps	Goals	Apps	Goals	Apps	Goals	Apps	Goals
Stoke City	1953–54	Second Division	5	3	0	0	–		5	3
Stoke City	1954–55	Second Division	2	0	2	2	–		4	2
Stoke City	1955–56	Second Division	24	5	5	1	–		29	6
Stoke City	1956–57	Second Division	42	26	1	1	–		43	27
Stoke City	1957–58	Second Division	33	12	4	2	–		37	14
Stoke City	1958–59	Second Division	8	0	0	0	–		8	0
Stoke City	Total		114	46	12	6	–		126	52
Crewe Alexandra	1958–59	Fourth Division	15	4	0	0	–		15	4
Crewe Alexandra	1959–60	Fourth Division	40	9	6	1	–		46	10
Crewe Alexandra	1960–61	Fourth Division	18	3	2	1	3	0	23	4
Crewe Alexandra	Total		73	16	8	2	3	0	84	18
Career total			187	62	20	8	3	0	210	70
