= Eric Littler =

English footballer

Personal information
- Date of birth: 14 April 1929
- Place of birth: St Helens, Merseyside, England
- Date of death: 2009 (aged 80)
- Position: Forward

Senior career*
Years	Team	Apps	(Gls)
1951–1952	Leicester City	5	(2)
1954–1955	Lincoln City	6	(2)
1955	Wrexham	12	(1)
1955–1956	Crewe Alexandra	10	(2)
- * Club domestic league appearances and goals

Eric Littler (14 April 1929 – 2009) is an English former footballer who played in the Football League for Crewe Alexandra, Leicester City, Lincoln City and Wrexham.
