= 1971–72 Texaco Cup =

Tournament details
- Country: England; Scotland; Northern Ireland; Ireland
- Teams: 16

Final positions
- Champions: (England) Derby County
- Runners-up: (Scotland) Airdrieonians

The 1971–72 Texaco Cup was the second edition of the tournament sponsored by Texaco. It was won by Derby County, who beat Airdrieonians in a two-legged final by 2–1 on aggregate.

== First round 1st leg ==
Home team	Result	Away team	Date
(Scotland) Falkirk	1–0	(England) Coventry City	14 September 1971
(Northern Ireland) Ballymena United	3–2	(Republic of Ireland) Waterford	15 September 1971
(England) Derby County	6–2	(Scotland) Dundee United	15 September 1971
(Scotland) Hearts	1–0	(England) Newcastle United	15 September 1971
(England) Huddersfield Town	1–0	(Scotland) Morton	15 September 1971
(England) Manchester City	2–2	(Scotland) Airdrieonians	15 September 1971
(Scotland) Motherwell	0–1	(England) Stoke City	15 September 1971
(Republic of Ireland) Shamrock Rovers	5–1	(Northern Ireland) Coleraine	15 September 1971

== First round 2nd leg ==
Home team	Result	Away team	Date
(Scotland) Morton	1–1	(England) Huddersfield Town	27 September 1971
(Scotland) Airdrieonians	2–0	(England) Manchester City	27 September 1971
(England) Coventry City	3–0	(Scotland) Falkirk	28 September 1971
(England) Newcastle United	2–1	(Scotland) Hearts	28 September 1971
(Northern Ireland) Coleraine	0–3	(Republic of Ireland) Shamrock Rovers	29 September 1971
(Scotland) Dundee United	3–2	(England) Derby County	29 September 1971
(England) Stoke City	4–1	(Scotland) Motherwell	29 September 1971
(Republic of Ireland) Waterford	3–3	(Northern Ireland) Ballymena United	30 September 1971

== Quarter-finals 1st leg ==
Home team	Result	Away team	Date
(England) Coventry City	1–1	(England) Newcastle United	19 October 1971
(England) Huddersfield Town	1–2	(Scotland) Airdrieonians	19 October 1971
(Northern Ireland) Ballymena United	4–1	(Republic of Ireland) Shamrock Rovers	20 October 1971
(England) Derby County	3–2	(England) Stoke City	20 October 1971

== Quarter-finals 2nd leg ==
Home team	Result	Away team	Date
(Scotland) Airdrieonians	5–1	(England) Huddersfield Town	3 November 1971
(England) Newcastle United	5–1	(England) Coventry City	3 November 1971
(Republic of Ireland) Shamrock Rovers	1–1	(Northern Ireland) Ballymena United	3 November 1971
(England) Stoke City	1–1	(England) Derby County	3 November 1971

== Semi-finals 1st leg ==
Home team	Result	Away team	Date
(Northern Ireland) Ballymena United	0–3	(Scotland) Airdrieonians	24 November 1971
(England) Derby County	1–0	(England) Newcastle United	24 November 1971

== Semi-finals 2nd leg ==
Home team	Result	Away team	Date
(Scotland) Airdrieonians	4–3	(Northern Ireland) Ballymena United	8 December 1971
(England) Newcastle United	2–4	(England) Derby County	8 December 1971

== Final 1st leg ==
26 January 1972
19:30 BST

(Scotland) Airdrieonians	0 – 0	(England) Derby County
	Report

Broomfield Park, Airdrie
Attendance: 16,000

== Final 2nd leg ==
26 April 1972
19:30 BST

(England) Derby County	2 – 1	(Scotland) Airdrieonians
Hinton (pen); Davies	Report	Whiteford

Baseball Ground, Derby
Attendance: 25,102
