= 1956–57 Stoke City F.C. season =

Stoke City
1956–57 season
- Chairman: Mr G. Taylor
- Manager: Frank Taylor
- Stadium: Victoria Ground
- Football League Second Division: 5th (48 Points)
- FA Cup: Third Round
- Top goalscorer: League: Neville Coleman (26); All: Neville Coleman (27)
- Highest home attendance: 38,729 vs Port Vale (10 October 1956)
- Lowest home attendance: 11,083 vs Bury (22 April 1957)
- Average home league attendance: 22,146
Home colours

The 1956–57 season was Stoke City's 50th season in the Football League and the 17th in the Second Division.

With Stoke now entering a fourth season of Second tier football, there was much pressure placed on both manager Frank Taylor and the squad for 1956–57. And Stoke made a great effort in an attempt to gain promotion with a fine home record and new floodlights which saw Lincoln City beaten 8–0 with Neville Coleman scoring 7. However, after this Stoke bizarrely failed to find the back of the net in six straight defeats and this poor run of form cost Stoke promotion and in the end they finished in 5th position with 48 points.

== Season review ==
=== League ===
In the 1956–57 season, with the pressure on both the manager and players, Stoke made a great effort at winning promotion back to the First Division. A string of fine home results over Notts County (6–0), Leyton Orient (7–1) and Rotherham United (6–0) raised the fans hopes. Floodlights were installed in October 1956 and the first match under the lights was in the Potteries derby against Port Vale. A crowd of 38,729 turned up to see Stoke win 3–1 to maintain their good form.

Neville Coleman was getting the bulk of Stoke goals which accumulated on 23 February 1957 when Lincoln City arrived at the Victoria Ground. That day Stoke hammered luckless Lincoln 8–0 with Coleman scoring a record seven of the goals. At this stage of the season promotion looked like it could be achieved but all of a sudden Stoke's form completely dropped, after a 1–1 draw with Sheffield United Stoke lost their next six matches and failed to score in any of them and their hopes of promotion died.

=== FA Cup ===
Stoke were drawn away at First Division side Arsenal in the third round and were beaten 4–2 by the "Gunners".

== Final league table ==
Pos	Team	Pld	W	D	L	GF	GA	GAv	Pts
3	Liverpool	42	21	11	10	82	54	1.519	53
4	Blackburn Rovers	42	21	10	11	83	75	1.107	52
5	Stoke City	42	20	8	14	83	58	1.431	48
6	Middlesbrough	42	19	10	13	84	60	1.400	48
7	Sheffield United	42	19	8	15	87	76	1.145	46

Rules for classification: 1) Points; 2) Goal average; 3) Goals scored

== Results ==
Stoke's score comes first

=== Legend ===
Win	Draw	Loss

=== Football League Second Division ===
Match	Date	Opponent	Venue	Result	Attendance	Scorers
1	18 August 1956	Middlesbrough	A	1–1	13,116	Cairns (pen)
2	20 August 1956	Grimsby Town	H	1–0	20,921	Coleman
3	25 August 1956	Leicester City	H	3–1	23,675	Coleman, Cairns (pen), Oscroft
4	28 August 1956	Grimsby Town	A	1–4	17,722	Bowyer
5	1 September 1956	Bristol Rovers	A	0–4	25,430	
6	3 September 1956	Doncaster Rovers	H	1–1	14,497	King
7	8 September 1956	Notts County	H	6–0	18,564	Kelly, Oscroft, Bowyer, Coleman (2), Cairns (pen)
8	10 September 1956	Doncaster Rovers	A	0–4	14,674	
9	15 September 1956	Liverpool	A	2–0	47,119	Kelly, King
10	22 September 1956	Leyton Orient	H	7–1	19,957	Kelly, King, Cairns (pen), Coleman, Oscroft (2), Bowyer
11	29 September 1956	Huddersfield Town	A	2–2	16,202	Oscroft, Bowyer
12	6 October 1956	Rotherham United	H	6–0	21,589	Oscroft, Bowyer, King (2), Coleman (2)
13	10 October 1956	Port Vale	H	3–1	38,729	Coleman (2), Kelly
14	13 October 1956	Lincoln City	A	1–0	13,066	Coleman
15	20 October 1956	Sheffield United	H	3–3	26,849	Coleman (2), Kelly
16	27 October 1956	Fulham	A	0–1	29,748	
17	3 November 1956	Nottingham Forest	H	2–1	32,637	Bowyer, Oscroft
18	10 November 1956	West Ham United	A	0–1	17,500	
19	17 November 1956	Blackburn Rovers	H	4–1	21,067	Bowyer, King, Coleman, Kelly
20	24 November 1956	Bristol City	A	2–1	17,796	Coleman, Kelly
21	1 December 1956	Swansea Town	H	4–1	23,409	Coleman, King, Bowyer (2)
22	8 December 1956	Barnsley	A	2–2	11,626	Bowyer, Kelly
23	15 December 1956	Middlesbrough	H	3–1	20,679	Coleman (3)
24	22 December 1956	Leicester City	A	2–3	28,178	Kelly (2)
25	29 December 1956	Bristol Rovers	H	2–1	30,936	Bowyer, Graver
26	1 January 1957	Bury	A	1–0	13,180	Graver
27	12 January 1957	Notts County	A	0–5	13,620	
28	19 January 1957	Liverpool	H	1–0	31,144	Oscroft
29	2 February 1957	Leyton Orient	A	2–2	18,705	Kelly (2)
30	9 February 1957	Huddersfield Town	H	5–1	27,503	Oscroft (2), Bowyer, Coleman, Cairns (pen)
31	16 February 1957	Rotherham United	A	0–1	11,511	
32	23 February 1957	Lincoln City	H	8–0	10,790	Coleman (7), King
33	1 March 1957	Sheffield United	A	1–1	20,277	Kelly
34	9 March 1957	Fulham	H	0–2	24,766	
35	16 March 1957	Nottingham Forest	A	0–4	32,294	
36	23 March 1957	West Ham United	H	0–1	19,875	
37	30 March 1957	Blackburn Rovers	A	0–1	27,600	
38	6 April 1957	Bristol City	H	0–2	13,397	
39	13 April 1957	Swansea Town	A	0–1	15,000	
40	20 April 1957	Barnsley	H	3–0	11,600	Bowyer (2), Graver
41	22 April 1957	Bury	H	2–0	11,083	Bowyer, Oscroft
42	29 April 1957	Port Vale	A	2–2	18,573	Graver, King

=== FA Cup ===
Round	Date	Opponent	Venue	Result	Attendance	Scorers
R3	5 January 1957	Arsenal	A	2–4	56,173	Coleman 43'; Oscroft 64'

=== Friendlies ===
Match	Opponent	Venue	Result
1	Manchester City	H	4–1
2	FK Radnički Niš	H	3–1
3	Rot-Weiss Essen	H	5–0
4	Schwenningen	A	1–3
5	SSV Ulm 1846	A	4–0
6	Forbach	A	4–3
7	FC Singen 04	A	4–2
8	Forbach	A	4–3
9	OGC Nice	A	1–2

== Squad statistics ==
Pos.	Name	League		FA Cup		Total	
Pos.	Name	Apps	Goals	Apps	Goals	Apps	Goals
GK	(England) Bill Robertson	42	0	1	0	43	0
DF	(England) Alec Acton	0	0	0	0	0	0
DF	(England) Peter Ford	2	0	0	0	2	0
DF	(England) John McCue	39	0	1	0	40	0
DF	(England) Frank Mountford	39	0	1	0	40	0
DF	(Scotland) Ken Thomson	40	0	1	0	41	0
DF	(England) Donald Whiston	3	0	0	0	3	0
MF	(England) Bill Asprey	9	0	0	0	9	0
MF	(Scotland) Bobby Cairns	36	5	1	0	37	5
MF	(England) Edward Rayner	2	0	0	0	2	0
MF	(England) John Sellars	40	0	1	0	41	0
FW	(England) Frank Bowyer	38	14	1	0	39	14
FW	(England) Neville Coleman	42	26	1	1	43	27
FW	(England) Andy Graver	13	5	0	0	13	5
FW	(England) Colin Hutchinson	1	0	0	0	1	0
FW	(Scotland) Joe Hutton	7	0	0	0	7	0
FW	(Scotland) George Kelly	30	13	1	0	31	13
FW	(England) Johnny King	34	9	1	0	35	9
FW	(England) Harry Oscroft	41	11	1	1	42	12
FW	(England) Peter Phoenix	0	0	0	0	0	0
FW	(England) Don Ratcliffe	1	0	0	0	1	0
FW	(England) Derrick Ward	3	0	0	0	3	0
