= 1955–56 Stoke City F.C. season =

Stoke City
1955–56 season
- Chairman: Mr G. Taylor
- Manager: Frank Taylor
- Stadium: Victoria Ground
- Football League Second Division: 13th (44 Points)
- FA Cup: Fifth Round
- Top goalscorer: League: Frank Bowyer & Johnny King (16); All: Frank Bowyer, Johnny King & Harry Oscroft (18)
- Highest home attendance: 36,362 vs Port Vale (31 March 1956)
- Lowest home attendance: 11,227 vs Bury (16 April 1956)
- Average home league attendance: 19,850
Home colours

The 1955–56 season was Stoke City's 49th season in the Football League and the 16th in the Second Division.

It was a season of what might have been for Stoke as they often looked capable of challenging for promotion but then played badly the next match. In the end Stoke had to settle for a final position of 13th after picking up a modest 44 points in what was a frustrating season.

== Season review ==
=== League ===
Manager Frank Taylor now backed by his namesake Mr G. Taylor made only minor adjustments to his squad for the start of the 1955–56 season. However, after a decent start to the season with Stoke looking capable of challenging for promotion the Stoke board showed their ambition. In November Stoke made an ambitious approach for Blackpool legend Stan Mortensen and it seemed that Stoke had signed a forward with some reasonable credentials, however much to the disappointment of the board Mortensen instead joined Hull City. So Stoke instead went and paid £11,000 to Lincoln City for their prolific forward Andy Graver. However, despite the new arrival being met by approval by the fans Graver would have an unsuccessful spell at the Victoria Ground.

After a strong start, Stoke slid down the table before finally ending up in a rather poor position of 13th. A 3–2 win against Liverpool was the best of the season in what was a 'thrilling' contest.

=== FA Cup ===
Stoke beat Exeter City (3–0) and Leicester City (2–1) both in replays before losing 2–1 at Newcastle United in the fifth round.

== Final league table ==
Pos	Team	Pld	W	D	L	GF	GA	GAv	Pts
11	Bristol City	42	19	7	16	80	64	1.250	45
12	Port Vale	42	16	13	13	60	58	1.034	45
13	Stoke City	42	20	4	18	71	62	1.145	44
14	Middlesbrough	42	16	8	18	76	78	0.974	40
15	Bury	42	16	8	18	86	90	0.956	40

Rules for classification: 1) Points; 2) Goal average; 3) Goals scored

== Results ==
Stoke's score comes first

=== Legend ===
Win	Draw	Loss

=== Football League Second Division ===
Match	Date	Opponent	Venue	Result	Attendance	Scorers
1	20 August 1955	Doncaster Rovers	A	4–2	13,087	King (3), Malkin
2	22 August 1955	Bristol Rovers	A	2–4	21,240	Bowyer, Lowell
3	27 August 1955	Sheffield Wednesday	H	2–0	24,529	Bowyer, Lowell
4	29 August 1955	Bristol Rovers	H	1–2	18,875	Lowell
5	3 September 1955	Nottingham Forest	A	3–2	16,620	Bowyer (2), Oscroft
6	5 September 1955	Plymouth Argyle	A	1–0	18,240	Oscroft
7	10 September 1955	Hull City	H	4–1	19,971	Bowyer (2), Malkin, Lawton
8	12 September 1955	Plymouth Argyle	H	4–1	17,179	King, Oscroft (2), Lawton
9	17 September 1955	Blackburn Rovers	A	0–3	23,445	
10	24 September 1955	Lincoln City	H	3–0	20,533	Emery (o.g.), Lawton, King
11	1 October 1955	Leicester City	A	1–3	26,831	Bowyer
12	8 October 1955	Port Vale	A	0–1	36,271	
13	15 October 1955	Rotherham United	H	1–0	17,421	King
14	22 October 1955	Middlesbrough	A	3–1	18,217	King, Oscroft (2)
15	29 October 1955	Notts County	H	0–2	15,737	
16	5 November 1955	Leeds United	A	0–1	21,138	
17	12 November 1955	Fulham	H	1–2	18,972	Cairns
18	19 November 1955	Bury	A	0–1	9,030	
19	26 November 1955	Barnsley	H	2–1	17,729	King (2)
20	3 December 1955	Swansea Town	A	0–0	18,457	
21	10 December 1955	Bristol City	H	4–2	17,039	King, Bowyer, Oscroft, Graver
22	17 December 1955	Doncaster Rovers	H	5–2	15,336	King (2), Bowyer, Graver, Coleman
23	24 December 1955	Sheffield Wednesday	A	0–4	23,579	
24	26 December 1955	Liverpool	A	2–2	49,604	King (pen), Oscroft
25	27 December 1955	Liverpool	H	3–2	29,108	Graver, Bowyer, Coleman
26	31 December 1955	Nottingham Forest	H	1–1	22,381	Bowyer
27	21 January 1956	Blackburn Rovers	H	1–2	18,731	King
28	11 February 1956	Leicester City	H	2–0	21,091	Coleman (2)
29	3 March 1956	Middlesbrough	H	2–5	20,134	Bowyer, Oscroft
30	10 March 1956	Bristol City	A	1–0	28,046	Oscroft
31	17 March 1956	Leeds United	H	2–1	16,007	Bowyer, Graver
32	24 March 1956	Fulham	A	0–2	20,325	
33	30 March 1956	West Ham United	A	0–2	16,231	
34	31 March 1956	Port Vale	H	1–1	36,362	Oscroft
35	2 April 1956	West Ham United	H	3–0	19,949	Graver, King, Coleman
36	7 April 1956	Barnsley	A	0–1	9,590	
37	14 April 1956	Swansea Town	H	5–0	12,770	Bowyer (2), Oscroft, King, Graver
38	16 April 1956	Bury	H	0–2	11,227	
39	21 April 1956	Notts County	A	3–1	11,355	Graver, Oscroft, Cairns
40	25 April 1956	Lincoln City	A	1–2	12,015	Oscroft
41	28 April 1956	Rotherham United	A	1–0	6,375	Oscroft
42	1 May 1956	Hull City	A	2–3	5,232	Bowyer, Ward

=== FA Cup ===
Round	Date	Opponent	Venue	Result	Attendance	Scorers
R3	7 January 1956	Exeter City	A	0–0	16,860	
R3 Replay	9 January 1956	Exeter City	H	3–0	14,513	Oscroft, Bowyer, Coleman
R4	28 January 1956	Leicester City	A	3–3	35,877	Bowyer, King, Graver
R4 Replay	30 January 1956	Leicester City	H	2–1	34,120	Graver, Oscroft
R5	15 February 1956	Newcastle United	A	1–2	61,540	King 51'

== Squad statistics ==
Pos.	Name	League		FA Cup		Total	
Pos.	Name	Apps	Goals	Apps	Goals	Apps	Goals
GK	(England) Wilf Hall	6	0	0	0	6	0
GK	(England) Bill Robertson	36	0	5	0	41	0
DF	(England) George Bourne	10	0	0	0	10	0
DF	(England) John McCue	36	0	3	0	39	0
DF	(England) Bobby Meadows	0	0	0	0	0	0
DF	(England) Jack Short	30	0	3	0	33	0
DF	(Scotland) Ken Thomson	37	0	5	0	42	0
DF	(England) Donald Whiston	12	0	3	0	15	0
MF	(England) Bill Asprey	3	0	0	0	3	0
MF	(Scotland) Bobby Cairns	33	2	5	0	38	2
MF	(England) Frank Mountford	15	0	1	0	16	0
MF	(England) John Sellars	33	0	5	0	38	0
FW	(England) Frank Bowyer	42	16	5	2	47	18
FW	(England) John Clowes	2	0	0	0	2	0
FW	(England) Neville Coleman	24	5	5	1	29	6
FW	(England) Andy Graver	24	7	5	2	29	9
FW	(Scotland) Joe Hutton	1	0	0	0	1	0
FW	(Scotland) George Kelly	4	0	0	0	4	0
FW	(England) Johnny King	36	16	5	2	41	18
FW	(England) John Lawton	9	3	0	0	9	3
FW	(England) Eric Lowell	7	3	0	0	7	3
FW	(England) John Malkin	11	2	0	0	11	2
FW	(England) Harry Oscroft	38	15	5	2	43	17
FW	(England) Don Ratcliffe	8	0	0	0	8	0
FW	(England) Derrick Ward	5	1	0	0	5	1
–	Own goals	–	1	–	0	–	1
