= 1959–60 Stoke City F.C. season =

Stoke City
1959–60 season
- Chairman: Albert Henshall
- Manager: Frank Taylor
- Stadium: Victoria Ground
- Football League Second Division: 17th (35 Points)
- FA Cup: Third Round
- Top goalscorer: League: Dennis Wilshaw & Frank Bowyer (13); All: Frank Bowyer (14)
- Highest home attendance: 27,212 vs Aston Villa (30 September 1959)
- Lowest home attendance: 4,070 vs Ipswich Town (30 April 1960)
- Average home league attendance: 14,506
Home colours

The 1959–60 season was Stoke City's 53rd season in the Football League and the 20th in the Second Division.

Stoke had a very poor end to an uneventful 1950s as for most of the season the side looked capable of mounting a promotion challenge but a truly awful run of results in March and April (10 straight defeats) meant that Stoke dropped down the table and only avoided relegation by five points as they finished in 17th position. At the end of the season new chairman Albert Hensall decided that a change of manager was needed and so sacked Frank Taylor and replaced him with Tony Waddington who would bring a new era to the club.

== Season review ==
=== League ===
The 1959–60 season began well with new signing from Burnley, Doug Newlands tormenting the Sunderland defence in a 3–1 victory. But thereafter their form rate was erratic although Lincoln City were beaten 6–1 with Dennis Wilshaw grabbing a fine hat trick. Soon after that win over Lincoln a 19-year-old Tony Allen won his first England cap. But it was proving difficult on the pitch for Stoke as after a 1–0 home win against Plymouth Argyle on 27 February 1960 Stoke sat in 6th position in the table looking to start a push for promotion, but 10 matches later they were in 17th five points away from relegation.

It was in defence where the problems lay as manager Frank Taylor used four different keepers one of which was Tommy Younger a fine keeper for Liverpool but in his ten matches for Stoke he lost nine of them conceding 22 goals and he quickly left. Ken Thomson was sold to Middlesbrough and legendary striker Frank Bowyer decided to retire.

However the biggest move at the end of the season was made by new chairman Albert Henshall who decided that after eight years at the club it was time for a change of manager and so Frank Taylor was sacked. In truth Stoke were as far away from top flight football than ever with crowds dropping and overall performances on the pitch had been the biggest disappointment. Despite this Taylor was shocked at being fired and vowed never to be associated with football again. In his place Henshall appointed Taylor's assistant Tony Waddington and Len Graham became Waddington's assistant.

=== FA Cup ===
Stoke failed to make it past the third round this season losing 3–1 away at Preston North End in a replay.

== Final league table ==
Pos	Team	Pld	W	D	L	GF	GA	GAv	Pts
15	Scunthorpe United	42	13	10	19	57	71	0.803	36
16	Sunderland	42	12	12	18	52	65	0.800	36
17	Stoke City	42	14	7	21	66	83	0.795	35
18	Derby County	42	14	7	21	61	77	0.792	35
19	Plymouth Argyle	42	13	9	20	61	89	0.685	35

Rules for classification: 1) Points; 2) Goal average; 3) Goals scored

== Results ==
Stoke's score comes first

=== Legend ===
Win	Draw	Loss

=== Football League Second Division ===
Match	Date	Opponent	Venue	Result	Attendance	Scorers
1	22 August 1959	Sunderland	H	3–1	20,471	Cairns (pen), Bowyer, Newlands
2	27 August 1959	Leyton Orient	A	1–2	13,606	King
3	29 August 1959	Portsmouth	A	2–2	24,627	Bentley (2)
4	2 September 1959	Leyton Orient	H	2–1	19,124	Bentley (2)
5	5 September 1959	Derby County	H	2–1	21,906	Bowyer, Wilshaw
6	9 September 1959	Lincoln City	A	0–3	8,868	
7	12 September 1959	Brighton & Hove Albion	H	1–3	17,630	Wilshaw
8	16 September 1959	Lincoln City	H	6–1	13,453	Bentley (2), Wilshaw (3), Cunliffe
9	19 September 1959	Swansea Town	A	2–2	14,626	Bentley, Newlands
10	26 September 1959	Bristol Rovers	H	0–1	17,990	
11	30 September 1959	Aston Villa	H	3–3	27,212	Newlands (pen), King, Bowyer
12	3 October 1959	Ipswich Town	A	0–4	16,103	
13	10 October 1959	Plymouth Argyle	A	3–2	20,087	King (2), Wilshaw
14	17 October 1959	Liverpool	H	1–1	17,703	Newlands (pen)
15	24 October 1959	Charlton Athletic	A	2–1	18,412	Bowyer, King
16	31 October 1959	Bristol City	H	1–3	14,439	Newlands
17	7 November 1959	Scunthorpe United	A	1–1	10,827	Newlands
18	14 November 1959	Rotherham United	H	2–3	10,238	Bowyer, King
19	21 November 1959	Cardiff City	A	4–4	21,500	Bowyer, King (2), Newlands
20	28 November 1959	Hull City	H	3–1	12,481	King, Wilshaw (2)
21	5 December 1959	Sheffield United	A	1–0	15,994	Bowyer
22	12 December 1959	Middlesbrough	H	2–5	15,212	Bowyer, Howitt
23	19 December 1959	Sunderland	A	2–0	12,221	Newlands, Cunliffe
24	26 December 1959	Huddersfield Town	H	1–1	20,183	Cunliffe
25	28 December 1959	Huddersfield Town	A	3–2	25,783	Bowyer, King, Howitt
26	2 January 1960	Portsmouth	H	4–0	16,653	Bowyer (2), King, Howitt
27	16 January 1960	Derby County	A	0–2	13,639	
28	23 January 1960	Brighton & Hove Albion	A	0–1	12,811	
29	6 February 1960	Swansea Town	H	4–2	11,713	Ward (2), Howitt, Asprey
30	13 February 1960	Bristol Rovers	A	1–3	11,421	Ratcliffe
31	27 February 1960	Plymouth Argyle	H	1–0	9,961	Bentley
32	5 March 1960	Liverpool	A	1–5	35,101	Bentley
33	12 March 1960	Charlton Athletic	H	1–3	9,947	Bowyer
34	17 March 1960	Hull City	A	0–4	11,750	
35	26 March 1960	Scunthorpe United	H	1–3	6,223	King
36	30 March 1960	Ipswich Town	H	1–2	4,070	Wilshaw
37	2 April 1960	Rotherham United	A	0–3	8,522	
38	9 April 1960	Cardiff City	H	0–1	9,548	
39	16 April 1960	Middlesbrough	A	0–1	17,161	
40	18 April 1960	Aston Villa	A	1–2	25,000	Bowyer
41	23 April 1960	Sheffield United	H	1–2	7,995	Wallace
42	30 April 1960	Bristol City	A	2–1	8,722	King, Williams (o.g.)

=== FA Cup ===
Round	Date	Opponent	Venue	Result	Attendance	Scorers
R3	9 January 1960	Preston North End	H	1–1	38,465	Howitt
R3 Replay	13 January 1960	Preston North End	A	1–3	35,352	Bowyer

== Squad statistics ==
Pos.	Name	League		FA Cup		Total	
Pos.	Name	Apps	Goals	Apps	Goals	Apps	Goals
GK	(England) Wilf Hall	3	0	0	0	3	0
GK	(England) Geoff Hickson	10	0	0	0	10	0
GK	(England) Bill Robertson	19	0	2	0	21	0
GK	(Scotland) Tommy Younger	10	0	0	0	10	0
DF	(England) Tony Allen	39	0	2	0	41	0
DF	(England) Ron Andrew	30	0	2	0	32	0
DF	(England) Terry Lowe	0	0	0	0	0	0
DF	(England) John McCue	25	0	2	0	27	0
DF	(England) Terry Ward	3	0	0	0	3	0
DF	(England) Eric Skeels	2	0	0	0	2	0
DF	(Scotland) Ken Thomson	7	0	0	0	7	0
DF	(England) Denis Wilson	10	0	0	0	10	0
DF	(Scotland) Ron Wilson	7	0	0	0	7	0
MF	(England) Bill Asprey	36	1	2	0	38	1
MF	(Scotland) Bobby Cairns	28	1	2	0	30	1
MF	(England) Edward Rayner	2	0	0	0	2	0
FW	(Australia) John Anderson	4	0	0	0	4	0
FW	(England) Tony Bentley	13	9	0	0	13	9
FW	(England) Frank Bowyer	31	13	1	1	32	14
FW	(England) John Cunliffe	25	3	2	0	27	3
FW	(England) Derek Edge	0	0	0	0	0	0
FW	(Scotland) Bobby Howitt	21	4	2	1	23	5
FW	(England) Johnny King	42	13	2	0	44	13
FW	(Scotland) Doug Newlands	32	8	2	0	34	8
FW	(England) Don Ratcliffe	31	1	0	0	31	1
FW	(England) Jimmy Wallace	2	1	0	0	2	1
FW	(England) Derrick Ward	9	2	0	0	9	2
FW	(England) Dennis Wilshaw	21	9	1	0	22	9
–	Own goals	–	1	–	0	–	1
