= 1957–58 Stoke City F.C. season =

Stoke City
1957–58 season
- Chairman: Mr C. Salmon
- Manager: Frank Taylor
- Stadium: Victoria Ground
- Football League Second Division: 11th (42 Points)
- FA Cup: Fifth Round
- Top goalscorer: League: George Kelly (22); All: George Kelly (24)
- Highest home attendance: 27,568 vs Leyton Orient (28 December 1957)
- Lowest home attendance: 10,879 vs Derby County (26 April 1958)
- Average home league attendance: 20,511
Home colours

The 1957–58 season was Stoke City's 51st season in the Football League and the 18th in the Second Division.

The pressure was now beginning to increase on Frank Taylor with the club gearing up for another season in the second tier. Taylor believed he was building a useful and settled squad however the supporters were starting to get impatient with him. The 1957–58 season was again a huge disappointment as after a good first half of the season was followed up by a poor second half and they ended up in 11th position.

== Season review ==
=== League ===
Prior to the start of the 1957–58 season both George Bourne and John Malkin had to retire from playing due to injury. Despite this the management left the transfer market alone during the summer of 1957 with Frank Taylor saying: I am slowly getting together a useful squad and building a settled side. However the club was still short on forward players with only five available these of Frank Bowyer, Neville Coleman, Johnny King, George Kelly and Harry Oscroft. Yet to their credit these five kept the goals flowing with Kelly top scoring with 24 to his name.

The 1957–58 season again proved to be a big disappointment and whilst until December Stoke were in the top two, they ended up in 11th place with absolutely nothing to show for the early efforts. Taylor did go out and spend £11,000 on Dennis Wilshaw from Wolverhampton Wanderers and long serving Frank Mountford bowed out after eight years and took up a coaching role a position he would keep until 1980.

The fruits of the club's youth policy were slowly play dividends with the emergence this season of Tony Allen a quality full back who go on to win international honours with England. Peter Bullock also came through the youth team whilst he did not have a very successful career with Stoke he made his debut against Swansea Town at the age of 16 and 163 days old and he scored becoming the club's youngest player and goalscorer.

=== FA Cup ===
Stoke made in-roads in the FA Cup overcoming Aston Villa in a 2nd replay and then Middlesbrough to reach the fifth round where they came up against a powerful Bolton Wanderers side who with the help of Nat Lofthouse beat Stoke 3–1 as they went on to lift the cup.

== Final league table ==
Pos	Team	Pld	W	D	L	GF	GA	GAv	Pts
9	Huddersfield Town	42	14	16	12	63	66	0.955	44
10	Bristol Rovers	42	17	8	17	85	80	1.063	42
11	Stoke City	42	18	6	18	75	73	1.027	42
12	Leyton Orient	42	18	5	19	77	79	0.975	41
13	Grimsby Town	42	17	6	19	86	83	1.036	40

Rules for classification: 1) Points; 2) Goal average; 3) Goals scored

== Results ==
Stoke's score comes first

=== Legend ===
Win	Draw	Loss

=== Football League Second Division ===
Match	Date	Opponent	Venue	Result	Attendance	Scorers
1	24 August 1957	Middlesbrough	H	4–1	23,286	Oscroft, King (2), Kelly
2	26 August 1957	Bristol City	H	3–0	23,001	King, Kelly, Bowyer
3	31 August 1957	Leyton Orient	A	2–0	17,497	Kelly, Oscroft
4	3 September 1957	Bristol City	A	1–2	25,432	Kelly
5	7 September 1957	Charlton Athletic	H	2–2	26,848	Kelly, Oscroft
6	9 September 1957	Bristol Rovers	H	3–5	23,090	Kelly, Coleman, Asprey
7	14 September 1957	Doncaster Rovers	A	1–0	9,157	King
8	16 September 1957	Bristol Rovers	A	0–2	20,022	
9	21 September 1957	Rotherham United	H	4–1	20,487	Kelly (3), Anderson
10	23 September 1957	Liverpool	H	1–2	23,231	Twentyman (o.g.)
11	28 September 1957	Huddersfield Town	A	0–1	12,467	
12	5 October 1957	Grimsby Town	H	4–1	18,540	Kelly (2), Ratcliffe, King
13	12 October 1957	Lincoln City	H	1–1	20,791	King
14	19 October 1957	Notts County	A	2–1	13,400	King, Kelly
15	26 October 1957	Ipswich Town	H	5–1	17,469	Acres (o.g.), Kelly (2), Oscroft (2)
16	2 November 1957	Blackburn Rovers	A	0–1	26,100	
17	4 November 1957	Cardiff City	H	3–0	20,116	Coleman (2), Bowyer
18	9 November 1957	Sheffield United	H	2–3	21,602	Coleman, Bowyer
19	16 November 1957	West Ham United	A	0–5	23,230	
20	23 November 1957	Barnsley	H	3–1	17,555	King, Kelly, Ratcliffe
21	30 November 1957	Fulham	A	4–3	19,781	King, Coleman (3)
22	9 December 1957	Swansea Town	H	6–2	24,113	King (2), Bowyer, Kelly (3)
23	14 December 1957	Derby County	A	0–0	24,358	
24	21 December 1957	Middlesbrough	A	3–1	19,220	Kelly (2), Coleman
25	26 December 1957	Cardiff City	A	2–5	30,240	Kelly (2)
26	28 December 1957	Leyton Orient	H	1–3	27,568	Coleman
27	11 January 1958	Charlton Athletic	A	0–3	20,157	
28	18 January 1958	Doncaster Rovers	H	0–0	21,466	
29	1 February 1958	Rotherham United	A	2–0	7,921	Bowyer, Ratcliffe
30	8 February 1958	Huddersfield Town	H	1–1	16,489	Kelly
31	22 February 1958	Barnsley	A	2–1	14,182	Bowyer, Short (o.g.)
32	1 March 1958	Notts County	H	0–1	13,425	
33	8 March 1958	Ipswich Town	A	3–1	17,169	Coleman (2), Wilshaw
34	15 March 1958	Blackburn Rovers	H	2–4	24,107	Coleman, Wilshaw
35	22 March 1958	Sheffield United	A	0–3	19,540	
36	29 March 1958	West Ham United	H	1–4	14,514	King
37	5 April 1958	Lincoln City	A	3–1	8,169	Oscroft, Wilshaw (2)
38	7 April 1958	Liverpool	A	0–3	39,449	
39	12 April 1958	Fulham	H	1–2	18,918	King (pen)
40	19 April 1958	Swansea Town	A	1–4	23,345	Bullock
41	22 April 1958	Grimsby Town	A	0–0	10,579	
42	26 April 1958	Derby County	H	2–1	10,879	Wilshaw (2)

=== FA Cup ===
Round	Date	Opponent	Venue	Result	Attendance	Scorers
R3	4 January 1958	Aston Villa	H	1–1	45,800	Kelly
R3 Replay	8 January 1958	Aston Villa	A	3–3 (aet)	38,939	Oscroft, Coleman, Kelly
R3 2nd Replay	13 January 1958	Aston Villa	N	2–0	37,702	Coleman, Cairns
R4	25 January 1958	Middlesbrough	H	3–1	43,756	Wilshaw (3) 32', 35', 81'
R5	15 February 1958	Bolton Wanderers	A	1–3	56,667	Cairns 87'

== Squad statistics ==
Pos.	Name	League		FA Cup		Total	
Pos.	Name	Apps	Goals	Apps	Goals	Apps	Goals
GK	(England) Wilf Hall	24	0	5	0	29	0
GK	(England) Ken Hancock	0	0	0	0	0	0
GK	(England) Bill Robertson	18	0	0	0	18	0
DF	(England) Tony Allen	34	0	5	0	39	0
DF	(England) Ron Andrew	5	0	0	0	5	0
DF	(England) John McCue	33	0	5	0	38	0
DF	(England) Peter Ford	5	0	0	0	5	0
DF	(Scotland) Ken Thomson	37	0	5	0	42	0
MF	(England) Bill Asprey	28	1	0	0	28	1
MF	(Scotland) Bobby Cairns	20	0	5	2	25	2
MF	(England) Frank Mountford	11	0	0	0	11	0
MF	(England) John Sellars	27	0	5	0	32	0
FW	(Australia) John Anderson	4	1	0	0	4	1
FW	(England) Frank Bowyer	36	5	5	0	41	5
FW	(England) Peter Bullock	3	1	0	0	3	1
FW	(England) Neville Coleman	33	12	4	2	37	14
FW	(England) Peter Hall	0	0	0	0	0	0
FW	(England) Colin Hutchinson	2	0	0	0	2	0
FW	(Scotland) George Kelly	33	22	5	2	38	24
FW	(England) Johnny King	38	15	3	0	41	15
FW	(England) Harry Oscroft	21	6	1	1	22	7
FW	(England) Don Ratcliffe	31	3	2	0	33	3
FW	(England) Dennis Wilshaw	19	6	5	3	24	9
–	Own goals	–	3	–	0	–	3
