= 1958–59 Stoke City F.C. season =

Stoke City
1958–59 season
- Chairman: Mr C. Salmon
- Manager: Frank Taylor
- Stadium: Victoria Ground
- Football League Second Division: 5th (49 Points)
- FA Cup: Fourth Round
- Top goalscorer: League: Dennis Wilshaw (15); All: Dennis Wilshaw (18)
- Highest home attendance: 30,083 vs Leyton Orient (27 December 1958)
- Lowest home attendance: 6,855 vs Grimsby Town (25 April 1959)
- Average home league attendance: 17,249
Home colours

The 1958–59 season was Stoke City's 52nd season in the Football League and the 19th in the Second Division.

After failing to sign any new players in the summer of 1958, Stoke City manager Frank Taylor faced a difficult season ahead. His decision not to strengthen the squad was soon proven to be a mistake, as the team suffered a 6–1 defeat on the opening day of the season. Despite a difficult start to the season, Stoke City managed to turn their fortunes around with two solid unbeaten runs before the end of 1958. These strong performances put the team in contention for promotion, but they were unable to maintain their momentum in 1959. Six wins out of 23 matches left them 11 points behind second-placed Fulham. It was a disappointing end to a season that had shown some promise.

== Season review ==
=== League ===
During the summer of 1958, Stoke City completed the rebuilding of the main stand at the Victoria Ground, which cost £70,000. While the stand was an impressive addition to the ground, some fans worried that the cost would impact the team's ability to sign new players. For the 1958–59 season, Stoke's lack of major signings and the absence of key players such as Bobby Howitt and Tony Allen put the team at a disadvantage. They were badly missed as Stoke were hammered 6–1 by an impressive Fulham side led by Johnny Haynes. After a slow start to the season, Stoke went on a nine-game unbeaten run in the league, which helped them climb to third place in the table by December. The team's resurgence was a welcome turnaround after a disappointing start. In the new year, Stoke's form declined, and they were unable to keep up with Sheffield Wednesday and Fulham at the top of the table. Stoke ultimately finished the season in 5th place, having fallen away from the top two positions. While it was a creditable finish, it was a disappointing end to a season that had promised so much.

The 1958–59 season was a transitional one for Stoke City, with the departure of Neville Coleman and the aging of some key players. Coleman had scored 52 goals in 126 appearances for the club before moving on to Crewe Alexandra. Veterans Frank Bowyer, John McCue, and Harry Oscroft were nearing the end of their careers. Despite these changes, there were reasons for optimism as the team continued to develop. Before the season was out, Oscroft was involved in a three-man swap, as he and Peter Ford move to Vale Park in exchange for John Cunliffe a left-winger who had a good career at Vale but failed to make an impression with Stoke. John Sellars who missed the season due to an eye injury decided to retire and Stoke decided to end their season with a trip to Morocco.

=== FA Cup ===
In the third round, Dennis Wilshaw bagged a hat trick as Oldham Athletic were well beaten 5–1 before Ipswich Town came and frustrated Stoke and in the fourth round before nicking a 1–0 win.

== Final league table ==
Pos	Team	Pld	W	D	L	GF	GA	GAv	Pts
3	Sheffield United	42	23	7	12	82	48	1.708	53
4	Liverpool	42	24	5	13	87	62	1.403	53
5	Stoke City	42	21	7	14	72	58	1.241	49
6	Bristol Rovers	42	18	12	12	80	64	1.250	48
7	Derby County	42	20	8	14	74	71	1.042	48

Rules for classification: 1) Points; 2) Goal average; 3) Goals scored

== Results ==
Stoke's score comes first

=== Legend ===
Win	Draw	Loss

=== Football League Second Division ===
Match	Date	Opponent	Venue	Result	Attendance	Scorers
1	23 August 1958	Fulham	A	1–6	31,853	Oscroft
2	27 August 1958	Sheffield Wednesday	H	3–0	24,126	King, Cairns (pen), Bullock
3	30 August 1958	Lincoln City	H	1–0	20,359	Oscroft
4	30 August 1958	Sheffield Wednesday	A	1–4	23,622	Oscroft
5	6 September 1958	Sunderland	A	1–3	31,894	King (pen)
6	10 September 1958	Scunthorpe United	H	4–3	17,824	King, Bullock, Wilshaw (2)
7	13 September 1958	Middlesbrough	H	3–1	24,867	King, Oscroft, Ratcliffe
8	18 September 1958	Scunthorpe United	A	1–1	14,232	Bullock
9	20 September 1958	Swansea Town	H	3–0	20,196	King, Wilshaw (2)
10	27 September 1958	Ipswich Town	A	2–0	17,569	King, Wilshaw
11	4 October 1958	Bristol Rovers	H	2–2	19,763	Bowyer, Thomson
12	13 October 1958	Charlton Athletic	A	2–1	17,959	King, Howitt
13	18 October 1958	Bristol City	H	2–1	22,657	King (pen), Thomson
14	22 October 1958	Derby County	H	2–1	20,456	Bowyer, Wilshaw
15	25 October 1958	Cardiff City	A	1–2	20,351	King
16	1 November 1958	Liverpool	H	0–2	26,919	
17	8 November 1958	Barnsley	A	1–2	12,080	Oscroft
18	15 November 1958	Rotherham United	H	3–0	15,263	Oscroft, Howitt (2)
19	22 November 1958	Sheffield United	A	1–2	18,636	Anderson
20	29 November 1958	Brighton & Hove Albion	H	3–0	13,251	Wilshaw (2), Howitt
21	6 December 1958	Grimsby Town	A	2–2	9,255	Howitt, Asprey
22	13 December 1958	Huddersfield Town	H	5–1	12,761	Howitt, Wilshaw (2), Bowyer, Ward
23	20 December 1958	Fulham	H	4–1	18,457	Howitt (2), Oscroft (2)
24	26 December 1958	Leyton Orient	A	1–0	12,173	Ward
25	27 December 1958	Leyton Orient	H	3–2	30,083	Asprey, Wilshaw (2)
26	3 January 1959	Lincoln City	A	1–3	8,813	Bowyer
27	31 January 1959	Middlesbrough	A	0–0	18,869	
28	7 February 1959	Swansea Town	A	0–1	11,123	
29	16 February 1959	Ipswich Town	H	1–0	11,230	King
30	21 February 1959	Bristol Rovers	A	0–1	16,341	
31	28 February 1959	Barnsley	H	2–1	13,015	Asprey, Wilshaw
32	7 March 1959	Bristol City	A	1–2	15,673	Howitt
33	14 March 1959	Cardiff City	H	0–1	11,929	
34	20 March 1959	Liverpool	A	4–3	35,507	Asprey, Wilshaw (2), White (o.g.)
35	28 March 1959	Charlton Athletic	H	2–1	14,115	Howitt, King
36	30 March 1959	Derby County	A	0–3	24,342	
37	4 April 1959	Rotherham United	A	0–0	10,172	
38	6 April 1959	Sunderland	H	0–0	7,513	
39	11 April 1959	Sheffield United	H	1–2	10,439	Bullock
40	18 April 1959	Brighton & Hove Albion	A	2–2	19,501	Bowyer, Bullock
41	22 April 1959	Huddersfield Town	A	2–1	9,891	Bowyer, Ward
42	25 April 1959	Grimsby Town	H	4–0	6,855	Ward, Asprey, King (2)

=== FA Cup ===
Round	Date	Opponent	Venue	Result	Attendance	Scorers
R3	4 January 1959	Oldham Athletic	H	5–1	22,035	Howitt, Asprey, Wilshaw (3)
R4	8 January 1959	Ipswich Town	H	0–1	27,062	

=== Friendlies ===
Match	Opponent	Venue	Result
1	Port Vale	A	1–2
2	Port Vale	A	4–0
3	Crewe Alexandra	A	5–1
4	Bilston	A	8–0
5	Airdrieonians	H	3–1
6	First Vienna	H	1–1
7	Macclesfield Town	A	2–0
8	WAC Casablanca	A	3–1
9	Royal Moroccan Army	A	5–0

== Squad statistics ==
Pos.	Name	League		FA Cup		Total	
Pos.	Name	Apps	Goals	Apps	Goals	Apps	Goals
GK	(England) Wilf Hall	11	0	2	0	13	0
GK	(England) Bill Robertson	31	0	0	0	31	0
DF	(England) Tony Allen	36	0	2	0	38	0
DF	(England) Ron Andrew	2	0	0	0	2	0
DF	(England) Peter Ford	7	0	0	0	7	0
DF	(England) John McCue	42	0	2	0	44	0
DF	(Scotland) Ken Thomson	38	2	2	0	40	2
MF	(England) Bill Asprey	42	5	2	1	44	6
MF	(Scotland) Bobby Cairns	29	1	2	0	31	1
FW	(Australia) John Anderson	6	1	0	0	6	1
FW	(England) Tony Bentley	2	0	0	0	2	0
FW	(England) Frank Bowyer	24	6	2	0	26	6
FW	(England) Peter Bullock	13	5	0	0	13	5
FW	(England) Neville Coleman	8	0	0	0	8	0
FW	(Scotland) Bobby Howitt	27	10	2	1	29	11
FW	(England) Johnny King	33	13	0	0	33	13
FW	(England) Harry Oscroft	28	8	2	0	30	8
FW	(England) Don Ratcliffe	31	1	0	0	31	1
FW	(England) Jimmy Wallace	6	0	0	0	6	0
FW	(England) Derrick Ward	15	4	2	0	17	4
FW	(England) Dennis Wilshaw	31	15	2	3	33	18
–	Own goals	–	1	–	0	–	1
