= Johnny King (footballer, born 1932) =

English footballer (1932–2025)

Personal information
- Full name: John William King
- Date of birth: 9 August 1932
- Place of birth: Wrenbury, England
- Date of death: 2 April 2025 (aged 92)
- Position: Forward

Senior career*
Years	Team	Apps	(Gls)
1950–1953	Crewe Alexandra	48	(17)
1953–1961	Stoke City	284	(106)
1961–1962	Cardiff City	33	(6)
1962–1967	Crewe Alexandra	178	(45)
Total		543	(174)
- * Club domestic league appearances and goals

John William King (9 August 1932 – 2 April 2025) was an English footballer who played as a forward in the Football League for Crewe Alexandra, Stoke City and Cardiff City.

King began his career with his local side Crewe Alexandra in 1950. He formed a partnership with Frank Blunstone and the pair were highly wanted by other clubs. King joined Stoke City for £8,000 and continued to show his worth. He spent eight seasons at the Victoria Ground making 311 appearances scoring 113 goals to become one of the club's greatest goalscorers. He later played for Cardiff City and in 1962 made a successful return to his home town team, Crewe Alexandra. King died on 2 April 2025, at the age of 92.

== Career ==
Despite his somewhat 'chunky' build, King was considered to be an excellent goal scorer. He started his career at his local Third Division North side Crewe Alexandra, making his debut on Boxing Day 1950 in a 1–0 defeat at Halifax Town. However, he did not become a first-team regular until the 1952–53 season. He scored his first Crewe goal in a 1–1 draw against Bradford City on 10 September 1952, and totalled 17 goals in the season, while forming a strong partnership with Frank Blunstone who was later capped by England.

When Blunstone left for Chelsea, King decided to join Stoke City (for a fee of £8,000 in September 1953), who were at the time in the Second Division. He immediately began to score goals and quickly became a firm fan favourite. Season after season, he scored regularly for Stoke and became one of the few Stoke players to score more than 100 League goals.

King was a natural left footer who was a very skilful player and, at 5'7" (1.70 m) not the typical forward in the 1950s, but his ability to lead the attacking line was undeniable. A regular scorer, he topped the scorer charts at Stoke in three seasons amassing 113 goals for the club in all competitions placing him as Stoke's fifth all-time top goalscorer.

King later joined Cardiff City for a season before returning to Crewe Alexandra where he scored on his second debut for the club (a 3-1 victory at Southport on 18 August 1962). He scored a further 16 goals that promotion-winning season, including a hat-trick against Oxford United on 13 October 1962. He formed another strong striking partnership, this time with the even more prolific Frank Lord, who scored a then record 33 goals for the side that season - Crewe fan Charlie Morris later wrote "Alex fans had a King to complement our Lord, and a biblical flood of goals resulted."

Before retiring at the end of the 1966–67 season, King took his total of Crewe goals over the two spells to 60 in 226 league games, and 64 goals in 242 games in all competitions. King went on to play tennis and almost qualified for the Wimbledon Championships in 1970.

== Career statistics ==
Appearances and goals by club, season and competition
Club	Season	League			FA Cup		League Cup		Total	
Club	Season	Division	Apps	Goals	Apps	Goals	Apps	Goals	Apps	Goals
Crewe Alexandra	1950–51	Third Division North	1	0	0	0	—		1	0
Crewe Alexandra	1951–52	Third Division North	2	0	0	0	—		2	0
Crewe Alexandra	1952–53	Third Division North	40	17	1	0	—		41	17
Crewe Alexandra	1953–54	Third Division North	5	0	0	0	—		5	0
Crewe Alexandra	Total		48	17	1	0	—		49	17
Stoke City	1953–54	Second Division	24	11	3	1	—		27	12
Stoke City	1954–55	Second Division	36	17	6	3	—		42	20
Stoke City	1955–56	Second Division	36	16	5	2	—		41	18
Stoke City	1956–57	Second Division	34	9	1	0	—		35	9
Stoke City	1957–58	Second Division	38	15	3	0	—		41	15
Stoke City	1958–59	Second Division	33	13	0	0	—		33	13
Stoke City	1959–60	Second Division	42	13	2	0	—		44	13
Stoke City	1960–61	Second Division	41	12	6	1	1	0	48	13
Stoke City	Total		284	106	26	7	1	0	311	113
Cardiff City	1961–62	First Division	33	6	1	0	4	2	38	8
Crewe Alexandra	1962–63	Fourth Division	46	17	3	0	1	0	50	17
Crewe Alexandra	1963–64	Third Division	41	9	2	0	1	0	44	9
Crewe Alexandra	1964–65	Fourth Division	42	10	0	0	1	0	43	10
Crewe Alexandra	1965–66	Fourth Division	40	8	4	1	3	1	47	10
Crewe Alexandra	1966–67	Fourth Division	8	1	0	0	1	0	9	1
Crewe Alexandra	Total		177	45	9	1	7	1	193	47
Career total			542	174	37	8	12	3	591	185

== Sources ==
- Crisp, Marco (1998). Crewe Alexandra Match by Match (2nd ed.). Nottingham: Tony Brown. ISBN 1-899468-81-1.
