= Frank Bowyer =

English footballer (1922–1999)

Personal information
- Full name: Francis Bowyer
- Date of birth: 10 April 1922
- Place of birth: Chesterton, England
- Date of death: 11 November 1999 (aged 77)
- Place of death: Truro, England
- Position: Inside forward

Senior career*
Years	Team	Apps	(Gls)
1937–1960	Stoke City	398	(137)
1960–1963	Macclesfield Town	114	(69)
Total		512	(206)

Managerial career
- 1960–1963: Macclesfield Town
- * Club domestic league appearances and goals

Francis "Frank" Bowyer (10 April 1922 – 11 November 1999) was an English footballer who played as an inside forward for Stoke City.

== Career ==
Bowyer was born in Chesterton, Staffordshire and played for Stoke-on-Trent schools before joining Stoke City's ground staff at 15. He signed professional forms in July 1939 just before the start of World War II and he played 28 matches in 1940–41 as also guested for Derby County during the war. He missed all of Stoke's 1946–47 season due to his national service. He was demobbed in February 1948 and made his Football League debut two months short of his 26th birthday some nine years after signing as a professional.

He was renowned for his powerful volley shot and he top scored for Stoke in 1948–49 scoring 21 goals which put him up there with the best in the country. He then handed in a transfer request which was accepted by manager Bob McGrory who wanted to swap him for Bolton's Willie Moir but Bowyer changed his mind and withdrew his request and he remained at Stoke for the rest of his career. He top scored again in 1949–50 with 15 then with 19 in 1950–51. Stoke under new manager Frank Taylor suffered relegation in 1952–53 and Bowyer was top goalscorer in 1953–54, 1955–56 and 1959–60 as Stoke failed to gain a return to the top flight. Taylor paid the price for failure and was replaced by Tony Waddington who deemed the 38-year-old Bowyer surplus to requirements and he was released which caused some controversy as he was only three league goals short of Freddie Steele's record of 140. He ended his career with three years as a player manager of Macclesfield Town.

== Post-retirement ==
He moved to Newquay with his wife where he became a school caretaker. He died in a hospital in Truro after a short illness in November 1999 aged 77.

== Career statistics ==
Appearances and goals by club, season and competition
Club	Season	League			FA Cup		Other		Total	
Club	Season	Division	Apps	Goals	Apps	Goals	Apps	Goals	Apps	Goals
Stoke City	1947–48	First Division	1	0	0	0	—		1	0
Stoke City	1948–49	First Division	31	21	4	0	—		35	21
Stoke City	1949–50	First Division	42	15	1	0	—		43	15
Stoke City	1950–51	First Division	39	16	4	3	—		43	19
Stoke City	1951–52	First Division	15	1	4	0	—		19	1
Stoke City	1952–53	First Division	29	3	2	0	—		31	3
Stoke City	1953–54	Second Division	41	14	3	4	—		44	18
Stoke City	1954–55	Second Division	29	13	6	2	—		35	15
Stoke City	1955–56	Second Division	42	16	5	2	—		47	18
Stoke City	1956–57	Second Division	38	14	1	0	—		39	14
Stoke City	1957–58	Second Division	36	5	5	0	—		41	5
Stoke City	1958–59	Second Division	24	6	2	0	—		26	6
Stoke City	1959–60	Second Division	31	13	1	1	—		32	14
Stoke City	Total		398	137	38	12	—		436	149
Macclesfield Town	1960–61	Cheshire League	41	29	6	2	2	1	49	32
Macclesfield Town	1961–62	Cheshire League	42	25	2	0	7	4	51	29
Macclesfield Town	1962–63	Cheshire League	31	15	0	0	4	1	35	16
Macclesfield Town	Total		114	69	8	2	13	6	135	77
Career total			512	206	46	14	13	6	571	226
