= Frank Taylor (footballer, born 1916) =

English footballer and manager

Personal information
- Full name: Frank Taylor
- Date of birth: 30 April 1916
- Place of birth: Hemsworth, England
- Date of death: 2 January 1970 (aged 53)
- Position: Full-back

Senior career*
Years	Team	Apps	(Gls)
1936–1944	Wolverhampton Wanderers	48	(0)

Managerial career
- 1948–1950: Scarborough
- 1952–1960: Stoke City
- * Club domestic league appearances and goals

Frank Taylor (30 April 1916 – 2 January 1970) was an English footballer and manager who played as full-back in the Football League for Wolverhampton Wanderers and managed Scarborough and Stoke City.

== Playing career ==
Taylor was a full-back who started his playing career with Wolverhampton Wanderers in 1936. He made his senior debut on 13 March 1937 in a 1–0 win at Chelsea. He played in the same team as his older brother Jack a handful of times, but it was only after his sibling left the club in Summer 1938 that Frank became a first team regular.

Taylor missed just one game of the 1938–39 season that saw Wolves reach the 1939 FA Cup Final, where they lost 4–1 to Portsmouth at Wembley. The suspension of league football in September 1939 due to the outbreak of World War II effectively ended Taylor's playing career. Although he turned out in some wartime fixtures for Wolves, he left the club and playing football in 1944.

== Management career ==
In June 1948 Taylor was appointed manager of Scarborough, and then became Frank Buckley's assistant at Hull City, also doing a similar role at Leeds United before becoming Stoke City manager in 1952.

Taylor took over from Bob McGrory, who had been at Stoke for 31 years, first as a player and later as manager. In his first season Stoke were relegated from the First Division after losing their final match of the season. The team's aim was to return to the top tier; they would go on to finish fifth in each of the 1954–55, 1956–57 and 1958–59 seasons. After a poor result in the 1959–60 campaign — in which Stoke finished in 17th position, at risk of further relegation — and health struggles which saw him miss part of the season, Taylor's contract was not renewed.

== Career statistics ==
=== As a player ===
Appearances and goals by club, season and competition
Club	Season	League			FA Cup		Total	
Club	Season	Division	Apps	Goals	Apps	Goals	Apps	Goals
Wolverhampton Wanderers	1936–37	First Division	5	0	0	0	5	0
Wolverhampton Wanderers	1937–38	First Division	2	0	0	0	2	0
Wolverhampton Wanderers	1938–39	First Division	41	0	6	0	47	0
Career total			48	0	6	0	54	0

=== As a manager ===
Managerial record by club and tenure
Team	From	To	Record				
Team	From	To	P	W	D	L	Win %
Stoke City	1 June 1952	31 May 1960	362	146	79	137	40.3
Total			362	146	79	137	40.3

== Honours ==
Wolverhampton Wanderers

- FA Cup runner-up: 1938–39
