= Stoke City F.C. Under-21s and Academy =

Stoke City Under-21s
- Full name: Stoke City Football Club Under-21s
- Nickname: The Potters
- Founded: 1863
- Ground: bet365 Stadium; Clayton Wood Training Ground
- Manager: Sam Stockley (Under-21s); Dean Marney (Under-18s)
- League: Premier League 2
- 2025–26: Premier League 2, 20th
- Website: www.stokecityfc.com/news/academy
Home colours

Stoke City Football Club Under-21s is the most senior of Stoke City's youth teams and the club's former reserve team. The Under-21 team is effectively Stoke City's second-string side. They play in Premier League 2. The team also competes in the Central League Cup, National League Cup, Premier League International Cup, Premier League Cup and Staffordshire Senior Cup. The under-18 team compete in the U18 Premier League and the FA Youth Cup.

They play their home matches at the club's main ground, the bet365 Stadium, St George's Park, Burton upon Trent as well as the club's Clayton Wood Training Ground. In previous seasons the team has played at Lyme Valley Stadium in Newcastle-under-Lyme, Macclesfield Town's Moss Rose, Nantwich Town's Weaver Stadium and Harrison Park in Leek.

== History ==
Stoke fielded a second team for the first time in a league competition, the Combination, in 1891–92, under the name of 'Stoke Swifts'. The Swifts also played in the Midland League and the local North Staffordshire & District League, which they won on two occasions. The team joined the Birmingham & District League in 1900–01 and was renamed 'Stoke Reserves'. They temporarily had to return to local leagues in 1908 after the first team suffered financial difficulties and had to resign from the Football League, taking the reserves' place in the Birmingham & District League. They returned in 1911–12 and continued to play in it until they joined the newly founded Central League, a specific reserve team only league. In 1925 after Stoke-on-Trent was granted City status the second string became "Stoke City Reserves". They won the Central League title in 1927–28 and remained in the league until the 1980s when a Division Two was created. Stoke were relegated in 1984–85, gaining promotion in 1991–92, but suffered instant relegation in 1992–93, however promotion was achieved in 1993–94. The league was restructured in 1996 with Stoke now in the Central League Premier Division, dropping down to Division One in 1999–2000. They won Division One in 2002–03 and then won the Premier Division in 2003–04. Stoke remained in the Central League until 2008.

Following the first team's promotion to the Premier League in 2008 the reserves joined the Premier Reserve League. In 2012 the Premier League implemented the Elite Player Performance Plan and introduced the Professional Development League, with reserve teams becoming under-21 teams. In The League was split into two in 2014–15, with Stoke playing in Division 2. In 2016 the league was re-branded Premier League 2 and the age limit increased to under-23. This was reverted back to under-21 from 2022–23.

== Current squads ==
As of 1 September 2026

=== Under-21s ===
Note: Flags indicate national team as defined under FIFA eligibility rules; some limited exceptions apply. Players may hold more than one non-FIFA nationality.

No.	Pos.	Nation	Player
—	GK	ENG	Caleb Clothier
—	GK	ENG	Noah Cooper
—	GK	ENG	Lucas Knight
43	DF	USA	Freddie Anderson
—	DF	ITA	Anas Dauda
52	DF	ITA	Laurence Giani
57	DF	ENG	Jaden Mears
—	DF	NED	Erik Pieters (overage)
54	DF	IRL	Raphael-Pijus Otegbayo
—	DF	ENG	Sanchez Phillips
—	DF	ENG	Owen Powell
—	DF	ENG	Will Thompson
—	MF	ENG	Oghosaiwi Enabulele
—	MF	ENG	Daniel Eyaife

No.	Pos.	Nation	Player
—	MF	ENG	Elliot Fearn
—	MF	POR	Eric Hamelberg
—	MF	ENG	Ryan Liu
—	MF	ENG	Josh Maskall
—	MF	SCO	George Morrison
—	MF	ENG	Pedro Nzau
—	FW	ENG	Tristan Achu
—	FW	ENG	Paul Makavore
58	FW	ENG	Tyler Martin
—	FW	ENG	Jack Newall
—	FW	IRL	Jayden Ogbebor
—	FW	ENG	Jerome Osei
—	FW	ENG	Adriel Walker

==== Out on loan ====
Note: Flags indicate national team as defined under FIFA eligibility rules; some limited exceptions apply. Players may hold more than one non-FIFA nationality.

No.	Pos.	Nation	Player
50	DF	KEN	Sydney Agina (at Tamworth)
55	MF	ENG	Ruben Curley (at Morecambe)
56	FW	ENG	Favour Fawunmi (at Oldham Athletic)

No.	Pos.	Nation	Player
59	MF	IRL	Gabriel Kelly (at Tamworth)
—	MF	ENG	Chinonso Chibueze (at South Shields)
—	GK	ENG	True Grant (at FC Halifax Town)

=== Under-18s ===
Note: Flags indicate national team as defined under FIFA eligibility rules; some limited exceptions apply. Players may hold more than one non-FIFA nationality.

No.	Pos.	Nation	Player
—	GK	ENG	Ben Chivers
—	GK	ENG	Jonathan Gordon
—	GK	WAL	Oscar Hatton
—	GK	ENG	Hayden Ovaere
—	DF	WAL	Thomas Alcock
—	DF	ENG	Rocco Bardsley
—	DF	ENG	Harry Collins
—	DF	ENG	Zak Frost
—	DF	ENG	Josh McWilliams
—	DF	ENG	Ruben Nieuwoudt
—	MF	ENG	Ayomide Ajiboye
—	MF	ENG	Lucas Connell
—	MF	ENG	Theo Hannah

No.	Pos.	Nation	Player
—	MF	ENG	Max Harrison
—	MF	ENG	Isreal Kelly
—	MF	ENG	Jamal Khan
—	MF	ENG	Tom Midwood
—	MF	ENG	Finley Nixon
—	MF	ENG	Sultan Sotunde
—	MF	ENG	Olly Swadden
—	MF	ENG	Deandre Witter
—	FW	WAL	Louie Bradbury
—	FW	ENG	Jahdell Holgate
—	FW	ENG	Angus Lloyd
—	FW	ENG	Max O’Reilly
—	FW	ENG	Nahshon Orhurhu

== Honours ==
=== Leagues ===
- The Central League
  - Champions: 1927–28, 2003–04
  - Runner-up: 1934–35
  - Division One (West) champions: 2002–03
  - Division Two champions: 1991–92
- North Staffordshire & District League
  - Champions: 1895–96, 1898–99
  - Runner-up: 1896–97
- The Combination
  - Runner-up: 1892–93, 1893–94
- Midland Football League
  - Runner-up 1894–95
- Birmingham & District League
  - Runner-up: 1903–04, 1904–05
- North Staffordshire Federation League
  - Runner-up: 1908–09
- Football League Youth Alliance
  - Division Three North champions: 1998–99

=== Cups ===
- FA Youth Cup
  - Runners-up: 1983–84
- Generation Adidas Cup
  - Winner: 2013–14
- Altstatten International Tournament
  - Runner-up: 2013–14
- Central League Cup
  - Winner: 1996–97
  - Runner-up: 2000–01
- Midland Youth League Cup
  - Winner: 1996–97
- North Staffordshire Federation League Cup
  - Runner-up: 1908–09

== Staff ==
Academy management

- Academy Director: Jack Higgins
- Head of Academy Coaching: Paul Harris
- Head of Academy Recruitment: Andrew Frost
- Head of Academy Education: Greg Briggs
- Head of Academy Medical: Jordan Beech
- Head of Academy Sports Science: Ben Cope
- Academy Safeguarding Lead: Wayne Taylor
- Head of Academy Analysis: Charlie Adams

Academy full-time coaching staff

- Lead Professional Development Phase Coach (U21): Sam Stockley
- Professional Development Phase Coach (U21): Warren Joyce
- Professional Development Phase Coach (U21): Liam Lawrence
- Professional Development Phase Coach (U21): Erik Pieters
- Lead Professional Development Phase Coach (U18): Dean Marney
- Professional Development Phase Coach (U18): Andy Matthews
- Professional Development Phase Coach (U18): Danny Pugh
- Lead Youth Phase Coach (U12-16s): Carlton Reid
- Youth Development Phase Coach: Liam Eaton
- Youth Development Phase Coach: Ricardo Fuller
- Youth Development Phase Coach: Ross Woodcock
- Lead Foundation Phase Coach (U7-U11): Connor Russo
- Foundation Phase Coach: Jason Brindley
- Lead Academy Goalkeeping Coach: Kieran Addison

== League performance ==
=== Reserves, U21s and U23s ===
Season	League	P	W	D	L	GF	GA	Pts	Pos
Entered the Combination as Stoke Swifts
1891–92	The Combination	22	13	1	8	49	29	27	4/12
1892–93	The Combination	22	14	4	4	48	23	32	2/12
1893–94	The Combination	18	10	1	7	57	31	21	2/10
1894–95	Midland Football League	26	14	7	5	90	33	35	2/14
1895–96	North Staffordshire & District League	30	21	7	2	109	29	49	1/16
1896–97	North Staffordshire & District League	25	18	3	5	84	33	39	2/14
1897–98	The Combination	24	10	5	9	42	35	25	3/13
1898–99	North Staffordshire & District League	22	17	1	4	84	25	35	1/12
1899–1900	North Staffordshire & District League	16	9	1	6	50	27	19	3/9
Renamed Stoke Reserves and joined the Birmingham & District League
1900–01	Birmingham & District League	34	17	5	12	80	51	39	4/18
1901–02	Birmingham & District League	34	15	6	13	50	45	36	9/18
1902–03	Birmingham & District League	34	14	6	14	63	45	34	10/18
1903–04	Birmingham & District League	34	21	6	7	89	55	48	2/18
1904–05	Birmingham & District League	34	20	5	9	68	33	45	2/18
1905–06	Birmingham & District League	34	14	7	13	71	60	35	8/18
1906–07	Birmingham & District League	34	13	8	13	62	64	34	9/18
1907–08	Birmingham & District League	34	12	9	13	53	57	33	11/18
Stoke resign from the Football League and first team replaces reserves in the Birmingham & District League
1908–09	North Staffordshire Federation League	15	11	1	3	44	22	23	2/10
1909–10	North Staffordshire & District League	26	20	0	6	76	23	40	3/14
1910–11	North Staffordshire & District League	26	14	3	9	65	32	31	5/14
First team leave the Birmingham & District League, reserves take their place
1911–12	Birmingham & District League	34	11	12	11	51	52	34	9/18
1912–13	Birmingham & District League	34	13	3	18	58	75	29	14/18
1913–14	Birmingham & District League	34	17	7	10	73	46	41	4/18
1914–15	Birmingham & District League	34	17	5	12	80	52	39	8/18
1914 to 1919 – World War I
1919–20	Birmingham & District League	34	14	4	16	73	68	32	12/18
1920–21	Birmingham & District League	34	11	6	17	46	62	28	12/18
Joined the newly formed reserve team only Central League
1921–22	Central League	42	19	9	14	71	52	47	6/22
1922–23	Central League	42	13	9	14	62	82	35	18/22
1923–24	Central League	42	11	12	19	43	58	34	17/22
1924–25	Central League	42	12	8	22	54	90	32	18/22
Stoke-on-Trent granted city status in 1925, renamed Stoke City Reserves
1925–26	Central League	42	14	8	20	74	93	36	18/22
1926–27	Central League	42	15	5	22	70	81	35	18/22
1927–28	Central League	42	23	8	11	101	62	54	1/22
1928–29	Central League	42	16	7	19	78	82	39	15/22
1929–30	Central League	42	17	10	15	70	83	44	8/22
1930–31	Central League	42	14	11	17	46	73	39	16/22
1931–32	Central League	42	12	10	20	57	101	34	16/22
1932–33	Central League	42	16	8	18	80	74	40	14/22
1933–34	Central League	42	26	4	12	88	66	56	3/22
1934–35	Central League	42	21	10	11	93	62	52	2/22
1935–36	Central League	42	10	10	22	66	95	30	20/22
1936–37	Central League	42	19	6	17	70	82	44	11/22
1937–38	Central League	42	12	12	18	55	76	36	21/22
1938–39	Central League	42	12	10	20	60	65	34	19/22
1939 to 1945 – World War II
1945–46	Central League	40	16	3	21	68	74	35	14/21
1946–47	Central League	42	11	10	21	56	89	32	18/22
1947–48	Central League	42	15	9	18	56	71	39	13/22
1948–49	Central League	42	16	6	20	65	69	38	14/22
1949–50	Central League	42	13	9	20	56	83	35	19/22
1950–51	Central League	42	6	9	27	34	92	21	22/22
1951–52	Central League	42	11	5	26	47	84	27	22/22
1952–53	Central League	42	17	7	18	67	69	41	11/22
1953–54	Central League	42	10	6	26	46	89	26	21/22
1954–55	Central League	42	19	5	18	69	78	43	12/22
1955–56	Central League	42	10	14	18	52	76	34	17/22
1956–57	Central League	42	17	11	14	65	62	45	8/22
1957–58	Central League	42	16	10	16	66	71	42	11/22
1958–59	Central League	42	22	8	12	81	54	52	4/22
1959–60	Central League	42	21	9	12	77	54	51	5/22
1960–61	Central League	42	9	11	22	42	71	29	20/22
1961–62	Central League	42	11	11	20	45	75	33	19/22
1962–63	Central League	42	22	8	12	75	50	52	6/22
1963–64	Central League	42	19	10	13	58	42	48	14/22
1964–65	Central League	42	10	12	20	42	71	32	18/22
1965–66	Central League	42	24	9	9	76	51	57	2/22
1966–67	Central League	42	18	5	19	65	68	41	11/22
1967–68	Central League	42	12	14	16	60	73	38	16/22
1968–69	Central League	42	15	9	18	45	42	39	13/22
1969–70	Central League	42	19	11	12	67	40	49	8/22
1970–71	Central League	42	10	14	18	52	64	34	18/22
1971–72	Central League	42	17	13	12	59	49	47	6/22
1972–73	Central League	42	23	8	11	86	55	54	2/22
1973–74	Central League	42	16	11	15	59	56	43	13/22
1974–75	Central League	42	18	12	12	50	40	48	6/22
1975–76	Central League	42	16	10	16	60	55	42	11/22
1976–77	Central League	42	13	18	11	49	50	44	10/22
1977–78	Central League	42	13	14	15	58	52	40	11/22
1978–79	Central League	42	23	11	8	65	45	57	3/22
1979–80	Central League	42	11	17	14	45	49	39	13/22
1980–81	Central League	42	14	11	17	51	57	39	14/22
1981–82	Central League	42	11	15	16	50	61	37	14/22
Central League Division Two created
1982–83	Central League Division One	30	14	6	10	54	57	34	7/16
Three points for a win introduced to reserve team football
1983–84	Central League Division One	30	11	6	13	52	59	39	9/16
1984–85	Central League Division One	34	8	6	20	43	72	30	17/18
1985–86	Central League Division Two	34	9	5	20	51	85	32	15/18
1986–87	Central League Division Two	32	13	5	14	42	48	44	9/17
1987–88	Central League Division Two	34	11	8	15	30	44	41	?/18
1988–89	Central League Division Two	34	17	10	7	60	38	61	?/18
1989–90	Central League Division Two	34	14	8	12	50	44	50	6/18
1990–91	Central League Division Two	34	12	5	17	51	67	41	?/18
1991–92	Central League Division Two	34	25	5	4	93	30	80	1/18
1992–93	Central League Division One	34	8	8	18	38	56	32	16/18
1993–94	Central League Division Two	34	21	3	10	54	41	66	3/18
1994–95	Central League Division One	34	12	7	15	46	44	43	11/18
1995–96	Central League Division One	34	17	8	9	57	42	59	3/18
League restructure
1996–97	Central League Premier Division	24	11	2	11	34	37	35	4/13
1997–98	Central League Premier Division	24	10	4	10	35	41	34	6/13
1998–99	Central League Premier Division	24	7	7	10	24	32	28	10/13
League restructure following creation of Premier Reserve League
1999–2000	Central League Premier Division	22	3	8	11	21	37	17	11/12
2000–01	Central League Division One	22	9	5	8	35	32	12	5/12
2001–02	Central League Division One	22	10	3	9	52	27	33	5/12
2002–03	Central League Division One	18	12	2	4	42	22	38	1/10
2003–04	Central League Premier Division	22	13	4	5	45	31	43	1/12
2004–05	Central League Premier Division	22	10	3	9	28	26	33	5/12
Leagues re-organised into geographical divisions
2005–06	Central League Central Division	18	7	2	9	22	30	23	6/10
2006–07	Central League Central Division	22	6	7	9	25	37	25	8/12
2007–08	Central League Central Division	22	9	3	10	25	36	30	9/12
Joined Premier Reserve League following first team's promotion
2008–09	Premier Reserve League South	16	4	2	10	18	23	14	8/9
2009–10	Premier Reserve League South	16	3	4	9	13	24	13	9/9
Resigned from the Premier Reserve League
2010–11	No league entered								
2011–12	Central League Central Division	12	3	3	6	15	23	12	7/7
Joined Professional Development League following league reconstruction
2012–13	Under-21 Premier League First Phase	12	1	1	10	11	37	4	7/7
2012–13	Under-21 Premier League Second Phase	12	2	1	9	14	28	7	7/7
2013–14	Under-21 Premier League	21	6	4	11	26	34	22	18/22
2014–15	Under-21 Premier League Division 2	22	4	6	12	23	50	18	11/12
2015–16	Under-21 Premier League Division 2	22	10	2	10	24	24	32	8/12
2016–17	Premier League 2 Division 2	22	4	8	10	25	36	20	11/12
2017–18	Premier League 2 Division 2	22	6	2	14	31	46	20	11/12
2018–19	Premier League 2 Division 2	22	7	7	8	42	37	28	7/12
2019–20	Premier League 2 Division 2	18	8	3	7	32	27	27	4/12
2020–21	Premier League 2 Division 2	24	14	3	7	41	30	45	2/13
2021–22	Premier League 2 Division 2	26	12	7	7	34	36	43	3/14
2022–23	Premier League 2 Division 2	20	3	5	12	26	45	14	10/11
2023–24	Premier League 2	20	7	2	11	38	55	23	19/26
2024–25	Premier League 2	20	4	3	13	26	43	15	25/26
2025–26	Premier League 2	20	7	4	9	29	42	25	20/29
