= Albert McPherson =

English footballer

Personal information
- Date of birth: 8 July 1927
- Place of birth: Salford, England
- Date of death: 11 January 2015 (aged 87)
- Position: Centre half

Youth career
- 1942–19xx: Salford Lads Club

Senior career*
Years	Team	Apps	(Gls)
- Royal Engineers
1949–1952	Bury	0	(0)
1952–1954	Stalybridge Celtic		
1954–1964	Walsall	351	(8)
Total		351	(8)
- * Club domestic league appearances and goals

Albert McPherson (8 July 1927 – 11 January 2015) was an English professional footballer who played as a centre half.

== Career ==
Born in Salford, McPherson played for Royal Engineers, Bury, Stalybridge Celtic and Walsall.

He played youth football with the Salford Lads Club, alongside Steve Fleet, Eddie Colman and Brian Doyle.

He later worked as a coach at West Bromwich Albion.
