= Salford Lads' Club =

Recreational club in Salford, England

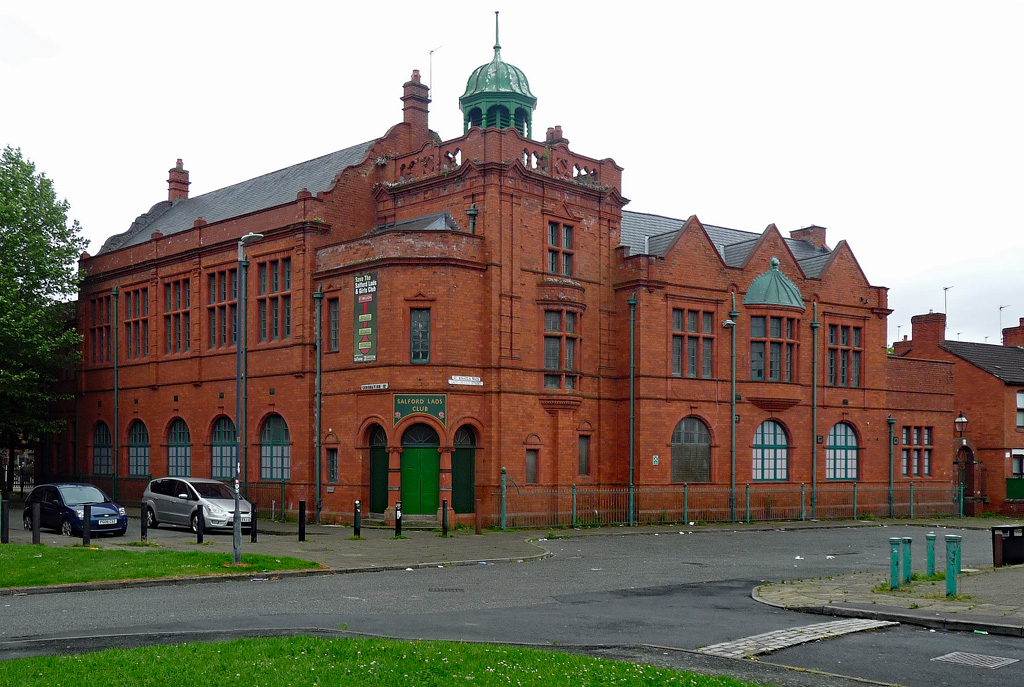
- Salford Lads' Club in 2017

- Location within Greater Manchester
- Alternative names: Salford Lads and Girls Club

General information
- Type: Recreational club
- Architectural style: Eclectic Elizabethan
- Location: Ordsall, Salford, England
- Coordinates: 53°28′36.73″N 2°16′27.77″W
- Construction started: 1903
- Opening: 1904 (122 years ago)
- Client: J. G. and W. G. Groves

Design and construction
- Architect: Henry Lord

Website
- salfordladsclub.org.uk

Listed Building – Grade II*
- Official name: Salford Lads Club
- Designated: 19 June 2026
- Reference no.: 1390580

Salford Lads' Club is a recreational club in the Ordsall area of Salford, Greater Manchester, England. Located on the corner of St Ignatius Walk and Coronation Street, it was established in 1903 as purpose-built club for boys, but today welcomes people of both sexes and runs a range of activities including sport, and creative and cultural events. The club also receives visitors from around the world on dedicated open days, with merchandise sales helping to support its operation.

The club was officially opened on 30 January 1904 by Robert Baden-Powell, who later founded the Scout movement. Former members include footballers Albert McPherson, Steve Fleet, Eddie Colman and Brian Doyle; Allan Clarke, lead singer of the 1960s pop group the Hollies; and Graham Nash, guitarist, songwriter and singer with the Hollies, who later formed Crosby, Stills, Nash and Young.

The building was listed at Grade II in 2003 for its largely unchanged tiled interior, original fittings and facilities, including a boxing ring, snooker rooms and a gym with a viewing balcony. English Heritage described it as "the most complete example of this rare form of social provision to survive in England." In 2007, the Manchester Evening News reported that the building, which appeared on the sleeve of the Smiths' album The Queen Is Dead, had placed third in a nationwide search for the country's most iconic buildings. Its status was upgraded to Grade II* on 19 June 2026. The upgrade reflected its rarity, the ambition of its design, and the high level of surviving original features.

== History ==
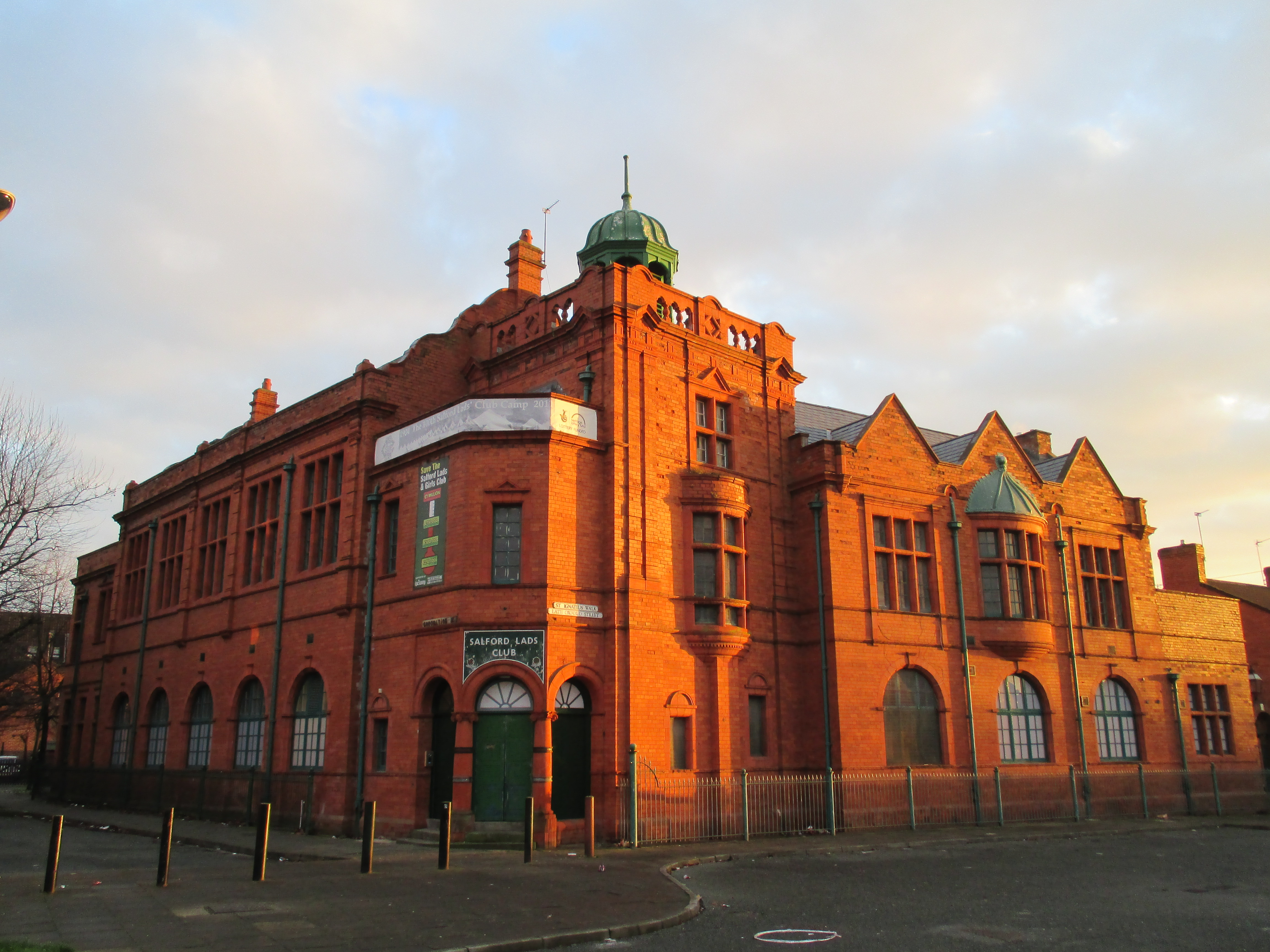
The building includes a boxing ring, snooker rooms and a gym

The concept of a boys' club grew up in the 19th century as a way of keeping young boys "off the streets" and encouraging them to become "good and worthy God-fearing citizens". The clubs were usually set up by local philanthropic businessmen and it was soon realised that to compete with the outside attractions of freedom from restraint and gambling they must provide not only for draughts, bagatelle, and billiards but for more exciting pursuits that most boys could not otherwise obtain such as gymnastics, boxing, fives, swimming and, especially, outdoor games.

In Salford and Manchester, a number of these clubs grew up in the most deprived areas, the first of which was Hulme Lads' Club, founded in 1850. Salford Lads' Club was founded in 1903 by two brothers, James and William Groves, from the family of brewers that were partners with Arthur William Whitnall in the Groves and Whitnall Brewery on Regent Road in Salford. Built and designed by Salford architect Henry Lord, who was also responsible for the former Salford Royal Hospital and Salford Museum and Art Gallery, the club opened in August 1903 and the ceremonial opening was by Robert Baden-Powell on 31 January 1904 three years before he founded the Scout movement.

The club was open every evening from 7pm to 10 pm, and in winter months its membership would reach 1,000.

The club has held an annual camp holiday since 1904. According to club Project Manager and local artist Leslie Holmes: "Salford Lads' Club has a remarkable tradition that predates the first Scout camps set up by Lord Baden Powell. Salford Lads' Club first camp was at Llanddulas in 1904, when 173 boys took part." The camps have been held during Whitsun since 1934.

Present day activities include football, snooker, table tennis, computer games, boxing training, dance, community meetings, exhibitions, kickboxing, excursions and jujitsu.

== Music, film and cultural heritage ==
The 1960s pop group the Hollies used to practice at the club before they became famous. Allan Clarke and Graham Nash were both members and their membership cards are still in the club's archives.

The club gained international recognition in 1986 when the alternative rock band the Smiths posed in front of the building for the inside cover of their album The Queen Is Dead. The Smiths' music video for the songs "There Is A Light That Never Goes Out" and "Stop Me If You Think You've Heard This One Before" also featured shots of the building's exterior. The committee were said at the time to be furious, and solicitors acting for the club claimed that:

"inclusion of the photograph may generally cause any person reading the [album] or listening to the record to attribute the material to the club, its committee or its members ... we would cite for example the reference in the song Vicar in a Tutu to the singer being engaged in stealing lead from a church roof, or indeed the very title to the album itself and the tenor of the title song."

However, the club now embraces this more recent legacy and welcomes fans to the club. The photograph, arranged by Morrissey and taken by pop photographer Stephen Wright, was accepted into the National Portrait Gallery in 2008. The club also featured in the music video for the Dream Academy's "Life in a Northern Town".

In 2003, a film documentary was made as part of the celebrations for the club's centenary. The film, introduced by Peter Hook, bassist for Joy Division and New Order, who lived on the Ordsall estate until he was 19, was made with the help of elderly residents and young members of the club and is a mix of interviews and location shots. The musician Vinny Peculiar, also known as Alan Wilks, has a longstanding association with the club, supporting various club events, performing for visiting Morrissey fans with ex-Smiths bassist Andy Rourke and rehearsing with his band, which includes ex-members of the Smiths, Oasis and the Fall.

The building has also been used as the location for a number of films and television dramas, including Channel 4's Shameless, Granada TV's 2002 remake of The Forsyte Saga, the film version of the Jacqueline Wilson's novel "Illustrated Mum", the BBC police drama Conviction, the 2008 remake of the 1970s BBC series Survivors. and the final season of Peaky Blinders. BBC Sport's The Football League Show and BBC One's first-ever outside broadcast of Football Focus were also filmed at the club. It also hosted an exclusive pre-show party for fashion house Chanel ahead of their Métiers d'art show in Manchester in December 2023.

In 2003, Historic England designated the club a Grade II listed building. Its listing record noted that the building is "thought to be the most complete example of this rare form of social provision to survive in England." On 19 June 2026, Salford Lads' Club was upgraded to Grade II* status. The updated listing regards it as the best surviving purpose‑built lads' club, a building type now rare. Its design was among the most ambitious of its kind, and much of its original plan and many of its fixtures, such as staircases, fireplaces, joinery, tiling, memorials, cupola and early sporting features, remain.

== Fundraising ==
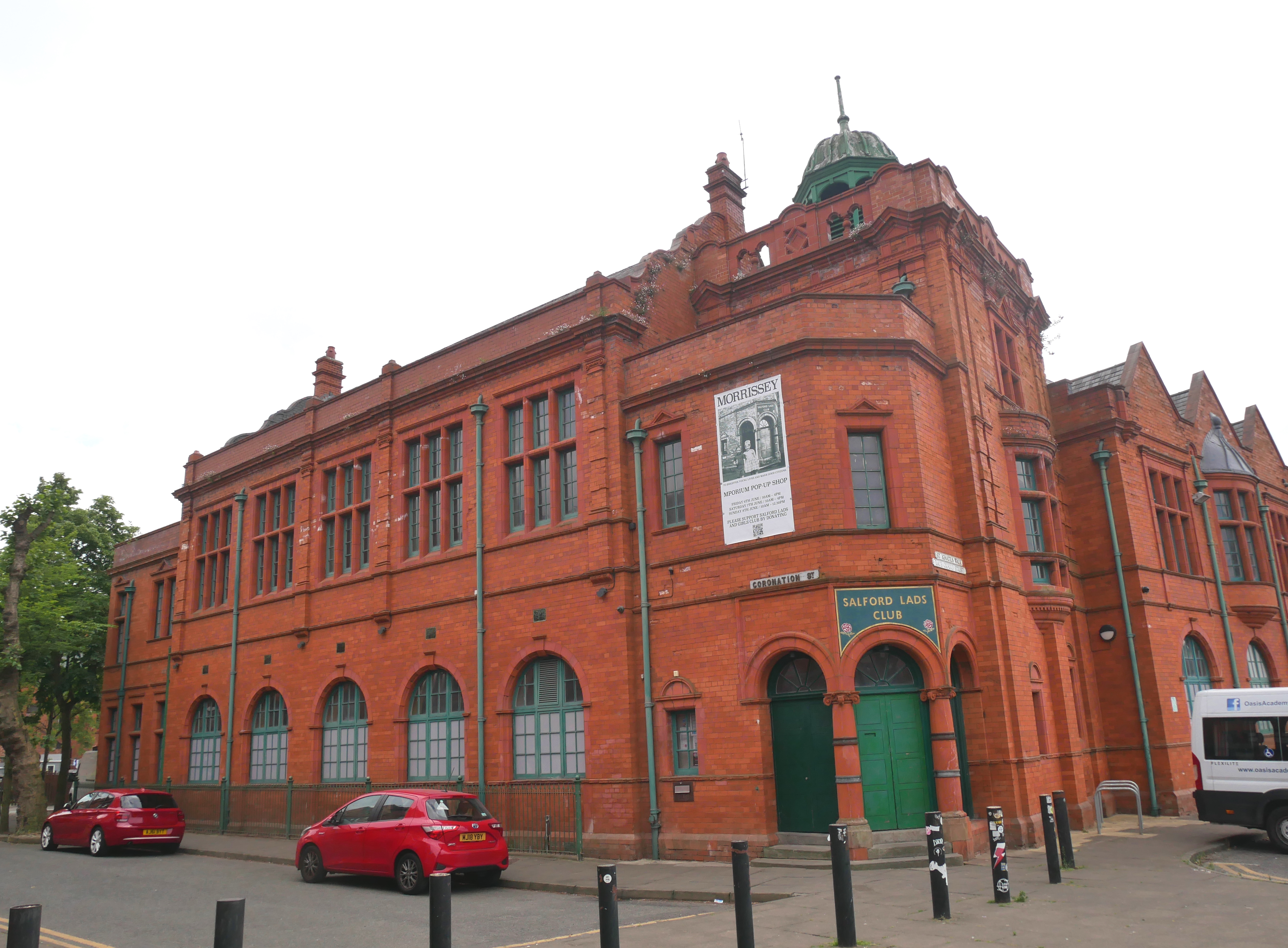
North face of the Salford Lads Club

Salford Lads and Girls club is a registered charity. The building has previously fallen into disrepair, and in May 2007, Warren Smith, Chairman of LPC Living and HRH Duke of Gloucester, launched an appeal to raise £1 million to restore the building to its former glory. The club also received publicity and funds after being featured in the Channel 4 series The Secret Millionaire in November 2007. Property developer Chek Whyte initially donated £15,000 towards repairs as part of the programme, then subsequently paid for roof repairs and has become involved with the club long-term.

The former frontman of the Smiths, Morrissey, has also donated funds towards restoration. He initially wanted to keep his donation of £20,000 a secret but was dissuaded from doing so, because the publicity would help the campaign.

In 2008, Vinny Peculiar released a single to support the club's £1 million fundraising drive. The song "Lazy Bohemians" was taken from his solo album Goodbye My Angry Friend. The B side and bonus download track of the single called "Ghost Camp", a song he co-wrote with former Smiths guitarist Craig Gannon, was written for a Salford Lads' Club award-winning play. The writer said: "Lazy Bohemians is a self-deprecating swipe against those whose talk about a revolution that never seems to get anywhere, a personal wake-up call to political apathy. My goal for this song is to really attract people's attention and wake people up from the apathy surrounding the club, making them realise that if we don't help it, the club, its fine musical history, and all of the good work it does with local kids will eventually, disappear".

== Volunteers ==
Two of the longest-serving volunteers, Arthur Edward (Archie) Swift and Eric Salthouse had between them over 100 years of service with the club. They both won accolades for their work: Swift was awarded the 'Salford Citizen of the Month' in April 2004 for his lifetime work as a volunteer at the club and Salthouse was named as 'My Hero' by Manchester entrepreneur Dave Tynan in the June 2004 edition of Social Enterprise magazine. Swift was also awarded the MBE for services to Young People (Salford, Greater Manchester) in the HM the Queen's Birthday Honours List 2006. In April 2023, the club shared that Archie had died, aged 88.

== See also ==
- Grade II* listed buildings in Greater Manchester
- Listed buildings in Salford
