= Joe Hutton =

Joe Hutton may refer to:

- Joseph Hutton (playwright) (1787-1828), American actor and playwright
- Joe Hutton (piper) (1923–1995), Northumbrian smallpiper
- Joe Hutton (footballer) (1927–1999), Scottish footballer
- Joe Hutton (basketball) (1928–2009), American basketball player
