= Stan Bevans =

English footballer (1934–2020)

Personal information
- Full name: Stanley Bevans
- Date of birth: 16 April 1934
- Place of birth: Kingsley, Staffordshire, England
- Date of death: 7 August 2020 (aged 86)
- Position: Forward

Senior career*
Years	Team	Apps	(Gls)
1949–1950	Cheadle Catholics		
1950–1955	Stoke City	15	(1)
1955–1959	Macclesfield Town	108	(19)
1960	Heanor Town		
1961	Freehay Rovers		
1962	Bolton Social Club		
Total		123	(20)
- * Club domestic league appearances and goals

Stanley Bevans (16 April 1934 – 7 August 2020) was an English professional footballer who played in the Football League for Stoke City. Stan Bevans became Stoke City's youngest ever player when he made his top flight debut in 1951, against Stanley Matthews' Blackpool.

== Career ==
Bevans was born in Kingsley, Staffordshire and attended Cheadle County Secondary Modern School and he played football with Cheadle Catholics in the Cheadle Youth League before joining Stoke City in 1950. Bevans was called up by Bob McGrory to the first team for a match against Blackpool on 31 March 1951 after Roy Brown was ruled out with an injury. He became at the time Stoke's youngest debutant at the age of 16 years, 11 months and five days.

He was used as a back-up forward playing only when there was no other option and also spent two seasons in the reserves. In 1954–55 he played 11 times and scored once which came in a 3–1 defeat away at Luton Town 18 September 1954. He later went on to play for Macclesfield Town, Heanor Town, Freehay Rovers and Bolton Social Club.

== Career statistics ==
Club	Season	League			FA Cup		Other		Total	
Club	Season	Division	Apps	Goals	Apps	Goals	Apps	Goals	Apps	Goals
Stoke City	1950–51	First Division	2	0	0	0	—		2	0
Stoke City	1951–52	First Division	2	0	0	0	—		2	0
Stoke City	1952–53	First Division	0	0	0	0	—		0	0
Stoke City	1953–54	Second Division	0	0	0	0	—		0	0
Stoke City	1954–55	Second Division	11	1	0	0	—		11	1
Stoke City	Total		15	1	0	0	—		15	1
Macclesfield Town	1955–56	Cheshire League	18	3	0	0	1	0	19	3
Macclesfield Town	1956–57	Cheshire League	38	10	7	1	6	1	51	12
Macclesfield Town	1957–58	Cheshire League	21	1	0	0	2	0	23	1
Macclesfield Town	1958–59	Cheshire League	31	5	1	0	3	0	35	5
Macclesfield Town	Total		108	19	8	1	12	1	128	21
Career Total			123	20	8	1	12	1	143	22
