= Donald Whiston (footballer) =

English footballer (1930–2020)

Personal information
- Full name: Donald Whiston
- Date of birth: 4 April 1930
- Place of birth: Stoke-on-Trent, England
- Date of death: 28 November 2020 (aged 90)
- Position: Midfielder

Senior career*
Years	Team	Apps	(Gls)
–	Boy's Brigade Football		
1949–1956	Stoke City	30	(4)
1956–1958	Crewe Alexandra	52	(8)
1958–1959	Rochdale	14	(0)
Total		96	(12)
- * Club domestic league appearances and goals

Donald Whiston (4 April 1930 – 28 November 2020) was a former footballer who played in the Football League for Crewe Alexandra, Rochdale and Stoke City.

== Career ==
Whiston started his career with his local club Stoke City making his debut for Stoke in the 1949–50 season against Sunderland. He spent eight years at the Victoria Ground where he was used as a utility and backup player and only made a handful of appearances. He left Stoke in 1956 for Crewe Alexandra where he spent two years and then he moved on to Rochdale.

== Career statistics ==
Appearances and goals by club, season and competition
Club	Season	League			FA Cup		Total	
Club	Season	Division	Apps	Goals	Apps	Goals	Apps	Goals
Stoke City	1949–50	First Division	4	2	1	0	5	2
Stoke City	1950–51	First Division	0	0	0	0	0	0
Stoke City	1951–52	First Division	1	0	0	0	1	0
Stoke City	1952–53	First Division	6	2	2	1	8	3
Stoke City	1953–54	Second Division	4	0	0	0	4	0
Stoke City	1954–55	Second Division	0	0	0	0	0	0
Stoke City	1955–56	Second Division	12	0	3	0	15	0
Stoke City	1956–57	Second Division	3	0	0	0	3	0
Stoke City	Total		30	4	6	1	36	5
Crewe Alexandra	1956–57	Third Division North	14	2	0	0	14	2
Crewe Alexandra	1957–58	Third Division North	38	6	1	1	39	7
Crewe Alexandra	Total		52	8	1	1	53	9
Rochdale	1957–58	Third Division North	14	0	0	0	14	0
Career total			96	12	7	2	103	14
