= Frank Elliott (footballer) =

Welsh footballer (1929–2018)

Personal information
- Full name: Frank Fredrick George Elliott
- Date of birth: 23 July 1929
- Place of birth: Lambeth, England
- Date of death: November 2018 (aged 89)
- Place of death: Carmarthenshire, Wales, United Kingdom
- Position: Goalkeeper

Youth career
- 1940–1945: Welsh Schoolboy Football

Senior career*
Years	Team	Apps	(Gls)
1946	Merthyr Tydfil		
1947–1952	Swansea Town	0	(0)
1952–1954	Stoke City	22	(0)
1954–1955	Fulham	25	(0)
1955–1958	Mansfield Town	63	(0)
1959	Bath City		
Total		110	(0)
- * Club domestic league appearances and goals

Frank Fredrick George Elliott ( 23 July 1929 – November 2018) was a Welsh former footballer who played in the Football League for Fulham, Mansfield Town and Stoke City.

== Career ==
Elliott was born in Lambeth and began his career with Merthyr Tydfil and then Swansea Town before he joined Stoke City in 1952. He provided back up to Bill Robertson and Dennis Herod making 13 appearances in 1952–53 and ten in 1953–54 before leaving for Fulham in March 1954. He spent three seasons at Craven Cottage and then moved to Mansfield Town where he spent two seasons making 69 appearances and later played for non-league Bath City.

== Career statistics ==
Club	Season	League			FA Cup		Total	
Club	Season	Division	Apps	Goals	Apps	Goals	Apps	Goals
Stoke City	1952–53	First Division	12	0	1	0	13	0
Stoke City	1953–54	Second Division	10	0	0	0	10	0
Fulham	1953–54	Second Division	8	0	0	0	8	0
Fulham	1954–55	Second Division	15	0	1	0	16	0
Fulham	1955–56	Second Division	2	0	0	0	2	0
Mansfield Town	1956–57	Third Division North	36	0	2	0	38	0
Mansfield Town	1957–58	Third Division North	27	0	4	0	31	0
Career Total			110	0	8	0	118	0
