= Ray Evans (disambiguation) =

Ray Evans (1915–2007) was an American songwriter.

Ray Evans may also refer to:

- Ray Evans (Australian businessman) (1939–2014), Australian business leader and campaigner against climate change mitigation efforts
- Ray Evans (halfback) (1922–1999), American football halfback
- Ray Evans (offensive lineman) (1924–2008), American football lineman
- Ray Evans (cartoonist) (1887–1954), American editorial cartoonist
- Ray Evans (footballer, born 1927) (1927–2010), English footballerfor Mansfield Town
- Ray Evans (footballer, born 1929) (1929–2005), English footballer for Crewe Alexandra
- Ray Evans (footballer, born 1933) (1933–2009), English footballer
- Ray Evans (footballer, born 1949), English footballer
- Ray Evans (rugby league) (1930–2017), rugby league footballer of the 1950s
- Ray Evans Seneca Theater, Salamanca, New York

== See also ==
- Raymond Evans (disambiguation)
