= Reese Hammond =

American politician

Reese Hammond was a newspaper editor and state legislator in Delaware. He served in the Delaware House of Representatives. He was a Democrat.

He served with fellow African Americans Oliver F. Fonville and John J. McMahon in the Delaware House. He also served in the House with Raymond T. Evans, a Republican.

== See also ==
- 123rd Delaware General Assembly
