= Jack McClelland =

Jack McClelland may refer to:

- Jack McClelland (footballer, born 1930) (1930–2004), English footballer who played in the Football League for Rochdale, Swindon Town and Stoke City
- Jack McClelland (footballer, born 1940) (1940–1976), Northern Irish international footballer who played as a goalkeeper
- Jack McClelland (publisher) (1922–2004), Canadian publisher
- Jack McClelland (tournament director) (1951–2025), poker tournament director and member of the Poker Hall of Fame
