= Brian Siddall =

English footballer

Personal information
- Full name: Alfred Brian Siddall
- Date of birth: 2 May 1930
- Place of birth: Northwich, England
- Date of death: 2007 (aged 78)
- Position: Winger

Senior career*
Years	Team	Apps	(Gls)
–	Witton Albion		
1948	Wolverhampton Wanderers	0	(0)
–	Witton Albion		
–	Northwich Victoria		
1950–1953	Stoke City	59	(10)
1954–1957	Bournemouth	85	(16)
1957–1960	Ipswich Town	58	(6)
–	Haverhill Rovers		
Total		202	(32)
- * Club domestic league appearances and goals

Alfred Brian Siddall (2 May 1930 – 2007) was an English footballer who played in the Football League for Bournemouth, Ipswich Town and Stoke City.

== Career ==
Siddall started his career at his local club Witton Albion before he earned a contract at Wolverhampton Wanderers however injury prevented him making an appearance. He rejoined Witton Albion and was signed by Northwich Victoria soon after. In 1950 Siddall joined Football League side Stoke City and was to challenge John Malkin for a place on the right wing and he had a successful 1951–52 and 1952–53 season when he played in virtually half the league games in both seasons before he moved to Bournemouth and on to Ipswich Town. He finished playing football at Haverhill Rovers while also working at Felixstowe Docks.

== Career statistics ==
Club	Season	League			FA Cup		Total	
Club	Season	Division	Apps	Goals	Apps	Goals	Apps	Goals
Stoke City	1950–51	First Division	8	0	0	0	8	0
Stoke City	1951–52	First Division	20	4	0	0	20	4
Stoke City	1952–53	First Division	21	1	0	0	21	1
Stoke City	1953–54	Second Division	10	5	0	0	10	5
Stoke City	Total		59	10	0	0	59	10
Bournemouth	1953–54	Third Division South	18	6	0	0	18	6
Bournemouth	1954–55	Third Division South	43	6	3	1	46	7
Bournemouth	1955–56	Third Division South	16	3	0	0	16	3
Bournemouth	1956–57	Third Division South	8	1	0	0	8	1
Bournemouth	Total		85	16	3	1	88	17
Ipswich Town	1957–58	Second Division	28	5	0	0	28	5
Ipswich Town	1958–59	Second Division	17	0	0	0	17	0
Ipswich Town	1959–60	Second Division	10	1	0	0	10	1
Ipswich Town	1960–61	Second Division	3	0	1	0	4	0
Ipswich Town	Total		58	6	1	0	59	6
Career Total			202	32	3	1	205	33
