= Raymond Evans =

Raymond Evans may refer to:

- Raymond Evans (architect), see Clifford Percy Evans
- Raymond Evans (director), films included 1943's Hemp for Victory
- Raymond Evans (field hockey) (1939–1974), Australian field hockey player
- Raymond T. Evans (1933–1984), a state legislator in Delaware
- Raymond Evans (USCG) (1921–2013), United States Coast Guard sailor
- Raymond Evans (writer), co-author of Radical Brisbane: An Unruly History, see Carole Ferrier

== See also ==
- Ray Evans (disambiguation)
