= John Cotton (footballer) =

English footballer

Personal information
- Full name: John Cotton
- Date of birth: 2 March 1930
- Place of birth: Stoke-on-Trent, England
- Date of death: 1 October 2015 (aged 85)
- Position: Full-back

Senior career*
Years	Team	Apps	(Gls)
1953–1954	Stoke City	2	(0)
1954–1955	Crewe Alexandra	14	(0)
1956–1958	Port Vale	0	(0)
- * Club domestic league appearances and goals

John Cotton (2 March 1930 – 1 October 2015) was an English footballer who played in the Football League for Stoke City and Crewe Alexandra.

== Career ==
Cotton came through the youth ranks at his local club Stoke City and made two Second Division appearances for the "Potters" during the 1953–54 season. He never established himself in the first-team at the Victoria Ground however, and left for Crewe Alexandra. He played 14 Third Division North and two FA Cup games for the "Railwaymen" during the 1954–55 campaign. He left Gresty Road for Port Vale, but never made a first-team appearance for the "Valiants".

== Career statistics ==
Appearances and goals by club, season and competition
Club	Season	League			FA Cup		Total	
Club	Season	Division	Apps	Goals	Apps	Goals	Apps	Goals
Stoke City	1953–54	Second Division	2	0	0	0	2	0
Crewe Alexandra	1954–55	Third Division North	14	0	2	0	16	0
Career total			16	0	2	0	18	0
