= Sammy Smyth =

Northern Irish footballer

Personal information
- Full name: Samuel Smyth
- Date of birth: 25 February 1925
- Place of birth: Belfast, Northern Ireland
- Date of death: 19 October 2016 (aged 91)
- Place of death: Grand Cayman, Cayman Islands
- Height: 5 ft 11 in (1.80 m)
- Position: Forward

Senior career*
Years	Team	Apps	(Gls)
1942–1945	Distillery		
1945–1947	Linfield		
1947	Dundela		
1947–1951	Wolverhampton Wanderers	102	(34)
1951–1953	Stoke City	40	(17)
1953–1954	Liverpool	44	(20)
1954	Bangor		
Total		186	(71)

International career
1948–1952	Northern Ireland	9	(5)
- * Club domestic league appearances and goals

Samuel Smyth (25 February 1925 – 19 October 2016) was a Northern Irish footballer who played in the Football League for Wolverhampton Wanderers, Stoke City and Liverpool.

== Career ==
Smyth was born in Belfast in 1925 and played for local clubs Distillery, Linfield and Dundela in the Irish League before being signed by English Football League side Wolverhampton Wanderers in July 1947 for a fee of £1,100. Despite taking Wolves to third place in the 1946–47 season manager Ted Vizard was replaced by his assistant Stan Cullis in June 1948. The following year Cullis led Wolves to the FA Cup final against Leicester City, Jesse Pye scoring two goals in the first half and Smyth netting another in the 68th minute. Smyth had scored both Wolves goals in the two semi-final games against Manchester Utd. The following season Wolves finished in 2nd place in the First Division. He had scored 43 goals in 116 cup and league appearances for Wolves.

In September 1951 Stoke City paid a club record fee of £25,000 to Wolves for Smyth in a bid to help them avoid relegation after an awful start to the 1951–52 season. Smyth had the desired impact at the Victoria Ground as he scored 12 vital goals as Stoke escaped the drop by three points. He scored five goals in 14 matches in 1952–53 before being sold to Liverpool in January 1953 for a fee of £12,000. Smyth made his debut for his new club against the side he just departed, Stoke just days later. He spent two seasons at Anfield scoring 20 goals in 44 appearances.

== After football ==
Smyth returned to Belfast where he played for Bangor and also worked as a bookmaker. He later opened his own sports distribution business which sold sports equipment throughout Ireland. He and his wife Enid regularly traveled to the Caribbean to visit their daughter and after his wife's passing in 2002 he later moved to live with his daughter. He died on 19 October 2016 at the age of 91 and was the last surviving player from the 1949 FA Cup winning team and the Stoke City team.

== Career statistics ==
=== Club ===
Appearances and goals by club, season and competition
Club	Season	League			FA Cup		Total	
Club	Season	Division	Apps	Goals	Apps	Goals	Apps	Goals
Wolverhampton Wanderers	1947–48	First Division	30	8	0	0	30	8
Wolverhampton Wanderers	1948–49	First Division	39	16	7	6	46	21
Wolverhampton Wanderers	1949–50	First Division	29	9	6	3	35	12
Wolverhampton Wanderers	1950–51	First Division	3	0	0	0	3	0
Wolverhampton Wanderers	1951–52	First Division	1	1	0	0	1	1
Wolverhampton Wanderers	Total		102	34	13	9	115	42
Stoke City	1951–52	First Division	26	12	4	2	30	14
Stoke City	1952–53	First Division	14	5	0	0	14	5
Stoke City	Total		40	17	4	2	44	19
Liverpool	1952–53	First Division	18	7	0	0	18	7
Liverpool	1953–54	First Division	26	13	0	0	26	13
Liverpool	Total		44	20	0	0	44	20
Career Total			186	71	17	11	203	82

=== International ===
National team	Year	Apps	Goals
Northern Ireland	1947	2	2
Northern Ireland	1948	2	0
Northern Ireland	1949	3	3
Northern Ireland	1950	1	0
Northern Ireland	1951	1	0
Total		9	5

== Honours ==
Wolverhampton Wanderers

- FA Cup: 1948–49
