= Billy McIntosh =

Scottish footballer

Personal information
- Full name: William Dowling McIntosh
- Date of birth: 7 December 1919
- Place of birth: Glasgow, Scotland
- Date of death: 1990 (aged 70–71)
- Place of death: West Midlands, England
- Position: Forward

Senior career*
Years	Team	Apps	(Gls)
1938–1946	St Johnstone	14	(9)
1946–1948	Preston North End	91	(46)
1948–1951	Blackpool	51	(15)
1951–1953	Stoke City	26	(5)
1953	Walsall	22	(9)
Total		204	(84)
- * Club domestic league appearances and goals

William Dowling McIntosh (7 December 1919 – 1990) was a Scottish footballer who played in his native land for St Johnstone, and in England for Blackpool, Preston North End, Stoke City and Walsall.

== Career ==
McIntosh was born in Glasgow and began his career with St Johnstone, spending much of the duration of World War II playing for Rangers before joining English side Preston North End in 1946. He made a strong impact in his first season in English football, scoring 32 goals in 44 matches. He scored 17 the following season and with Preston struggling he left for Blackpool. At Bloomfield Road he struggled to establish himself in a star-studded squad and he joined Stoke City in September 1952 after playing 56 matches for Blackpool scoring 16 goals in four seasons. At Stoke he played 25 matches scoring six goals in 1951–52 and ended his career with a season at Walsall.

== Career statistics ==
Club	Season	League			FA Cup		Total	
Club	Season	Division	Apps	Goals	Apps	Goals	Apps	Goals
Preston North End	1946–47	First Division	40	27	4	5	44	32
Preston North End	1947–48	First Division	34	14	4	3	38	17
Preston North End	1948–49	First Division	17	5	0	0	17	5
Preston North End	Total		91	46	8	8	99	54
Blackpool	1948–49	First Division	14	7	0	0	14	7
Blackpool	1949–50	First Division	29	7	5	1	34	8
Blackpool	1950–51	First Division	6	1	0	0	6	1
Blackpool	1951–52	First Division	2	0	0	0	2	0
Blackpool	Total		51	15	5	1	56	16
Stoke City	1951–52	First Division	24	5	1	1	25	6
Stoke City	1952–53	First Division	2	0	0	0	2	0
Stoke City	Total		26	5	1	1	27	6
Walsall	1952–53	Third Division South	22	9	1	0	23	9
Career Total			190	75	15	10	205	85
