= Harold Connor =

English footballer

Personal information
- Full name: Harold Connor
- Date of birth: 23 December 1929
- Place of birth: Liverpool, England
- Date of death: November 2016 (aged 86)
- Place of death: Wirral, England
- Position: Forward

Youth career
- Peterborough United

Senior career*
Years	Team	Apps	(Gls)
–	Marine		
1952–1954	Stoke City	4	(2)
–	Marine		
- * Club domestic league appearances and goals

Harold Connor (23 December 1929 – November 2016) was an English footballer who played for Stoke. He was the last amateur to play for the club.

== Career ==
Born in Liverpool, Connor began playing football with Peterborough United as he was serving with RAF Halton. He returned to his native Merseyside and became a PE teacher in Crosby and played football with non-league Marine. He joined the professional side Stoke City in 1952 signing on amateur contract forms and scored within 10 minutes on his debut against Sunderland in March 1953. After he declined to sign a professional contract he was released by manager Frank Taylor and Connor returned to Marine whilst continuing to work as a teacher.

== Career statistics ==
Club	Season	League			FA Cup		Total	
Club	Season	Division	Apps	Goals	Apps	Goals	Apps	Goals
Stoke City	1952–53	First Division	2	1	0	0	2	1
Stoke City	1953–54	Second Division	2	1	0	0	2	1
Career Total			4	2	0	0	4	2
