= Poker in 1980 =

This article summarizes the events related to the world of poker in 1980.

== Major tournaments ==
=== 1980 World Series of Poker ===
Stu Ungar wins the main tournament.

=== 1980 Super Bowl of Poker ===
Gabe Kaplan wins the main tournament.

== Poker Hall of Fame ==
Blondie Forbes is inducted.
