= Arthur Woodall =

English footballer

Personal information
- Full name: Arthur Woodall
- Date of birth: 4 June 1930
- Place of birth: Stoke-on-Trent, England
- Date of death: 2005 (aged 75)
- Position: Forward

Senior career*
Years	Team	Apps	(Gls)
–	Tunstall Park		
1953–1954	Stoke City	1	(0)
–	Altrincham		
- * Club domestic league appearances and goals

Arthur Woodall (4 June 1930 – 2005) was an English footballer who played in the Football League for Stoke City.

== Career ==
Woodall was born in Stoke-on-Trent and played for amateur football Tunstall Park before joining Stoke City in 1953. He made his one and only appearance for the club in a 1–0 defeat at home to Oldham Athletic on 20 March 1954. He left the club at the end of the 1953–54 season and joined Cheshire League side Altrincham.

== Career statistics ==
Appearances and goals by club, season and competition
Club	Season	Division	League		FA Cup		Total	
Club	Season	Division	Apps	Goals	Apps	Goals	Apps	Goals
Stoke City	1953–54	Second Division	1	0	0	0	1	0
Career Total			1	0	0	0	1	0
