= Roy Beckett =

English footballer

Personal information
- Full name: Roy Wilson Beckett
- Date of birth: 20 March 1928
- Place of birth: Stoke-on-Trent, England
- Date of death: 11 September 2008 (aged 80)
- Place of death: Poole, England
- Position: Defender

Youth career
- 1942: Milton Youth Club

Senior career*
| Years | Team | Apps | (Gls) |
| 1943–1950 | Burslem Albion | | |
| 1950–1954 | Stoke City | 14 | (1) |
| 1953 | Northwich Victoria | | |
- * Club domestic league appearances and goals

Roy Wilson Beckett (20 March 1928 – 11 September 2008) was an English footballer who played in the Football League for Stoke City.

== Career ==
Beckett was born in Stoke-on-Trent and played football with Milton Youth Club and Burslem Albion before joining Stoke City in 1950. He was used as a back-up player and in four seasons with the club he played in fifteen matches scoring once against Everton on 13 January 1951. After he left Stoke in 1954 he went on to play for Northwich Victoria.

== Career statistics ==
| Club | Season | League | | | FA Cup | | Total | |
| Club | Season | Division | Apps | Goals | Apps | Goals | Apps | Goals |
|---|---|---|---|---|---|---|---|---|
| Stoke City | 1950–51 | First Division | 3 | 1 | 1 | 0 | 4 | 1 |
| Stoke City | 1951–52 | First Division | 3 | 0 | 0 | 0 | 3 | 0 |
| Stoke City | 1952–53 | First Division | 4 | 0 | 0 | 0 | 4 | 0 |
| Stoke City | 1953–54 | Second Division | 4 | 0 | 0 | 0 | 4 | 0 |
| Career Total | | | 14 | 1 | 1 | 0 | 15 | 1 |
