= Oliver Fonville =

American politician

Oliver Fonville (February 19, 1905-February 28 2003) was a state legislator in Delaware. His middle is listed both as S. and H. He served in the Delaware House of Representatives 3rd district, as a Democrat.

Fonville served with fellow African Americans John J. McMahon and Reese Hammond.

He represented the Third District. He lived in Wilmington.
