= Bill Finney =

English footballer (born 1931)

Personal information
- Full name: Charles William Thomas Finney
- Date of birth: 5 September 1931 (age 95)
- Place of birth: Stoke-on-Trent, England
- Position: Inside forward

Senior career*
| Years | Team | Apps | (Gls) |
| 1947–1949 | Crewe Alexandra | 0 | (0) |
| 1949–1955 | Stoke City | 57 | (14) |
| 1955–1957 | Birmingham City | 14 | (0) |
| 1957–1958 | Queens Park Rangers | 10 | (1) |
| 1958 | Crewe Alexandra | 1 | (0) |
| 1958–1959 | Rochdale | 31 | (1) |
| 1959–1961 | Macclesfield Town | 32 | (8) |
| Total | | 145 | (24) |
- * Club domestic league appearances and goals

Charles William Thomas Finney (born 5 September 1931) is an English former footballer who played as an inside forward in the Football League for Birmingham City, Crewe Alexandra, Queens Park Rangers, Rochdale and Stoke City.

== Career ==
Finney was born in Stoke-on-Trent and began his career with Crewe Alexandra as an amateur before turning professional with Stoke City as an 18-year-old in 1949. He spent the first three seasons with Stoke in the reserves making his debut away at Manchester United on 11 October 1952, Finney scoring in a 2–0 victory. He scored twice in his next two matches in defeats against Portsmouth and Bolton Wanderers as Stoke went on a poor run of form which led them to being relegated to the Second Division. He scored six goals in 25 appearances during 1953–54 and was used sparingly by manager Frank Taylor in 1954–55 as Stoke narrowly missed out on promotion. Finney signed for Second Division champions Birmingham City, for whom he played in the Inter-Cities Fairs Cup. After failing to fully establish himself at St Andrew's Finney had short spells with Queens Park Rangers, Crewe Alexandra and finished his professional career at Rochdale. He later played for non-league Macclesfield Town where he scored eight goals in 32 games.

== Career statistics ==
| Club | Season | Division | League | | FA Cup | | Other | | Total | |
| Club | Season | Division | Apps | Goals | Apps | Goals | Apps | Goals | Apps | Goals |
|---|---|---|---|---|---|---|---|---|---|---|
| Stoke City | 1952–53 | First Division | 21 | 4 | 1 | 1 | 0 | 0 | 22 | 5 |
| Stoke City | 1953–54 | Second Division | 25 | 6 | 0 | 0 | 0 | 0 | 25 | 6 |
| Stoke City | 1954–55 | Second Division | 11 | 4 | 4 | 0 | 0 | 0 | 15 | 4 |
| Stoke City | Total | | 57 | 14 | 5 | 1 | 0 | 0 | 62 | 15 |
| Birmingham City | 1955–56 | First Division | 10 | 0 | 2 | 1 | 1 (Note: Appearances in the Inter-Cities Fairs Cup) | 0 | 13 | 1 |
| Birmingham City | 1956–57 | First Division | 4 | 0 | 0 | 0 | 0 | 0 | 4 | 0 |
| Birmingham City | Total | | 14 | 0 | 2 | 1 | 1 | 0 | 17 | 1 |
| Queens Park Rangers | 1957–58 | Third Division South | 10 | 1 | 0 | 0 | 0 | 0 | 10 | 1 |
| Crewe Alexandra | 1958–59 | Fourth Division | 1 | 0 | 0 | 0 | 0 | 0 | 1 | 0 |
| Rochdale | 1958–59 | Third Division | 31 | 3 | 3 | 1 | 0 | 0 | 34 | 4 |
| Macclesfield Town | 1959–60 | Cheshire League | 24 | 7 | 1 | 0 | 7 | 2 | 32 | 9 |
| Macclesfield Town | 1960–61 | Cheshire League | 8 | 1 | 0 | 0 | 0 | 0 | 8 | 1 |
| Macclesfield Town | Total | | 32 | 8 | 1 | 0 | 7 | 2 | 40 | 10 |
| Career total | | | 145 | 24 | 11 | 3 | 8 | 2 | 164 | 29 |
