= George Bourne (footballer) =

English footballer

Personal information
- Full name: George Fredrick Bourne
- Date of birth: 5 March 1932
- Place of birth: Burslem, Stoke-on-Trent, England
- Date of death: 7 October 2004 (aged 72)
- Position: Defender

Youth career
- Middleport County School
- Park Road Youth Club
- Burslem Albion

Senior career*
Years	Team	Apps	(Gls)
1952–1956	Stoke City	100	(1)
- * Club domestic league appearances and goals

George Fredrick Bourne (5 March 1932 – 7 October 2004) was an English footballer who played in the Football League for Stoke City.

== Career ==
Bourne was an amateur at local club Burslem Albion before he signed a professional contract at Stoke City. He transferred from a centre forward into a defender and became a useful player in the Second Division however after exactly 100 League appearances Bourne suffered a badly broken leg and consequently had to retire. The club paid him £855 in compensation and also gave him a Testimonial match in 1957. He later ran his own window cleaning business before his death in 2004.

== Career statistics ==
Club	Season	League			FA Cup		Total	
Club	Season	Division	Apps	Goals	Apps	Goals	Apps	Goals
Stoke City	1952–53	First Division	20	0	0	0	20	0
Stoke City	1953–54	Second Division	42	1	3	0	45	1
Stoke City	1954–55	Second Division	28	0	6	0	34	0
Stoke City	1955–56	Second Division	10	0	0	0	10	0
Career Total			100	1	9	0	109	1
