= Billy Waters (footballer, born 1931) =

Welsh footballer (born 1931)

Personal information
- Full name: William Anthony Waters
- Date of birth: 19 September 1931
- Place of birth: Swansea, Wales
- Position: Goalkeeper

Senior career*
Years	Team	Apps	(Gls)
1950–1952	Blackpool	0	(0)
1952–1953	Stoke City	0	(0)
1953–1954	Southend United	0	(0)
1954–1955	Swansea Town	0	(0)
1955–1960	Wrexham	99	(0)
1960–1961	Millwall	5	(0)
1961–1964	Yiewsley		
1964	Llanelli		
Total		104	(0)
- * Club domestic league appearances and goals

William Anthony Waters (born 19 September 1931) is a Welsh former footballer who played as a goalkeeper. He made appearances in the English Football League with Wrexham and Millwall.

== Career ==
Waters first signed for Blackpool in 1950, however, would make no appearances for them. This would also be the case for his next three clubs, signing for Stoke City, Southend United and Swansea Town, all without making an appearance for any of them.

His first professional appearances came with Wrexham, signing in 1955, where he would make 99 league appearances in the 5 years he spent there.

He would move to Millwall in 1960, where he would spend 1 season, making 5 appearances before moving to Yiewsley.

== Career statistics ==
Club	Season	League			FA Cup		Total	
Club	Season	Division	Apps	Goals	Apps	Goals	Apps	Goals
Blackpool	1951–52	First Division	0	0	0	0	0	0
Stoke City	1952–53	First Division	0	0	0	0	0	0
Southend United	1953–54	Third Division South	0	0	0	0	0	0
Swansea Town	1954–55	Second Division	0	0	0	0	0	0
Wrexham	1955–56	Third Division North	29	0	1	0	30	0
Wrexham	1956–57	Third Division North	42	0	7	0	49	0
Wrexham	1957–58	Third Division North	7	0	0	0	7	0
Wrexham	1958–59	Third Division	13	0	0	0	13	0
Wrexham	1959–60	Third Division	8	0	0	0	8	0
Wrexham	Total		99	0	8	0	107	0
Millwall	1960–61	Fourth Division	5	0	1	0	6	0
Career total			104	0	9	0	113	0
