= John Clowes (footballer) =

English footballer (1929–2021)

Personal information
- Full name: John Alan Clowes
- Date of birth: 5 November 1929
- Place of birth: Alton, Staffordshire, England
- Date of death: June 2021 (aged 91)
- Place of death: Staffordshire, England
- Position: Forward

Senior career*
Years	Team	Apps	(Gls)
1949–1950	Crewe Alexandra	0	(0)
1950–1951	Stoke City	2	(2)
1952–1954	Shrewsbury Town	11	(2)
1954–1955	Wellington Town		
1955–1956	Stoke City	2	(0)
1956–1959	Macclesfield Town	115	(56)
Total		130	(60)
- * Club domestic league appearances and goals

John Alan Clowes (5 November 1929 – June 2021) was an English footballer who played in the Football League for Shrewsbury Town and Stoke City. He made four appearances for Stoke.

== Career ==
Clowes was born in Alton, Staffordshire and started his career with Crewe Alexandra before making the short move to Stoke City in 1950. He made just two appearances for Stoke during the 1950–51 season and scored twice in a 3–2 win over Wolverhampton Wanderers at the end of the season. Despite this, he left and joined Shrewsbury Town and then Wellington Town. He made a return to Stoke in the 1955–56 season where he again made just two appearances before joining another non-league club in the form of Macclesfield Town.

== Death ==
Clowes died in Staffordshire in June 2021, at the age of 91.

== Career statistics ==
Appearances and goals by club, season and competition
Club	Season	League			FA Cup		Other		Total	
Club	Season	Division	Apps	Goals	Apps	Goals	Apps	Goals	Apps	Goals
Stoke City	1950–51	First Division	2	2	0	0	—		2	2
Shrewsbury Town	1952–53	Third Division South	8	2	0	0	—		2	2
Shrewsbury Town	1953–54	Third Division South	3	0	0	0	—		3	0
Shrewsbury Town	Total		11	2	0	0	—		11	2
Stoke City	1955–56	Second Division	2	0	0	0	—		2	0
Macclesfield Town	1955–56	Cheshire League	9	5	0	0	0	0	9	5
Macclesfield Town	1956–57	Cheshire League	36	23	7	12	6	3	49	38
Macclesfield Town	1957–58	Cheshire League	37	21	2	2	3	4	42	27
Macclesfield Town	1958–59	Cheshire League	33	7	0	0	2	1	35	8
Macclesfield Town	Total		115	56	9	14	11	8	146	78
Career Total			130	60	9	14	11	8	161	82
