= Dennis Hughes (footballer) =

English footballer

Personal information
- Full name: Dennis Hughes
- Date of birth: 9 April 1931
- Place of birth: Stoke-on-Trent, England
- Date of death: October 1990 (aged 59)
- Position: Outside right

Senior career*
| Years | Team | Apps | (Gls) |
| – | Fenton | | |
| 1950–1951 | Stoke City | 1 | (0) |
| – | Congleton Town | | |
- * Club domestic league appearances and goals

Dennis Hughes (9 April 1931 – October 1990) was an English footballer who played in the Football League for Stoke City.

== Career ==
Hughes played amateur football with Fenton in Stoke-on-Trent and played a match for Stoke City during the 1950–51 season. He played at outside right against Huddersfield Town in a 1–0 defeat before returning to amateur football with Congleton Town.

== Career statistics ==
| Club | Season | League | | | FA Cup | | Total | |
| Club | Season | Division | Apps | Goals | Apps | Goals | Apps | Goals |
|---|---|---|---|---|---|---|---|---|
| Stoke City | 1950–51 | First Division | 1 | 0 | 0 | 0 | 1 | 0 |
| Career Total | | | 1 | 0 | 0 | 0 | 1 | 0 |
