= Jack McClelland (footballer, born 1930) =

English footballer

Personal information
- Full name: William John McClelland
- Date of birth: 11 August 1930
- Place of birth: Colchester, England
- Date of death: 2004 (aged 74)
- Position: Forward

Senior career*
| Years | Team | Apps | (Gls) |
| 1951–1952 | Colchester United | 0 | (0) |
| 1952–1954 | Stoke City | 4 | (0) |
| 1954–1955 | Swindon Town | 14 | (1) |
| 1955–1956 | Rochdale | 24 | (5) |
| Total | | 42 | (6) |
- * Club domestic league appearances and goals

William John "Jack" McClelland (11 August 1930 – 2004) was an English footballer who played in the Football League for Rochdale, Swindon Town and Stoke City.

== Career ==
McClelland was born in Colchester and played for local side Colchester United. He impressed in the club's reserve side and was spotted by scouts at First Division Stoke City who paid a small fee to acquire his signature. However, he failed to impress managing just four matches in 1952–53 and none the following season. He left the Victoria Ground in August 1954 and spent a season with Swindon Town and then Rochdale.

== Career statistics ==
Appearances and goals by club, season and competition
| Club | Season | League | | | FA Cup | | Total | |
| Club | Season | Division | Apps | Goals | Apps | Goals | Apps | Goals |
|---|---|---|---|---|---|---|---|---|
| Stoke City | 1952–53 | First Division | 4 | 0 | 0 | 0 | 4 | 0 |
| Stoke City | 1953–54 | Second Division | 0 | 0 | 0 | 0 | 0 | 0 |
| Swindon Town | 1954–55 | Third Division South | 14 | 1 | 0 | 0 | 14 | 1 |
| Rochdale | 1955–56 | Third Division North | 24 | 5 | 0 | 0 | 24 | 5 |
| Career Total | | | 42 | 6 | 0 | 0 | 42 | 6 |
