= Joe Bernstein =

Joe Bernstein is the name of:

- Joe Bernstein (boxer) (1877–1931), one of the first great boxers to emerge from New York's Lower East Side
- Joe Bernstein (American football) (1893–1967), professional football player
- Joe Bernstein (poker player) (1899–1975), poker player and road gambler
