= Ken Thomson (footballer) =

Scottish footballer

Personal information
- Full name: Kenneth Gordon Thomson
- Date of birth: 25 February 1930
- Place of birth: Aberdeen, Scotland
- Date of death: 15 June 1969 (aged 39)
- Place of death: Middlesbrough, England
- Position: Centre half

Youth career
- Banks O' Dee

Senior career*
Years	Team	Apps	(Gls)
1948–1952	Aberdeen	29	(0)
1952–1960	Stoke City	278	(6)
1960–1962	Middlesbrough	84	(1)
1962–1963	Hartlepools United	28	(2)
Total		419	(9)
- * Club domestic league appearances and goals

Kenneth Gordon Thomson (25 February 1930 – 15 June 1969) was a Scottish footballer, who played in the Football League for Hartlepools United, Middlesbrough and Stoke City. He made 278 appearances for Stoke.

== Career ==
Born in Aberdeen, Thomson was poised to sign for Stoke in 1946 from Scottish club Banks O' Dee but he was called up for national service in the Royal Air Force. After his demob Thomson joined his home town club Aberdeen. Stoke manager Frank Taylor finally got his signature for a fee of £22,000 in September 1952. A strong and commanding defender Thomson was soon made captain by Taylor. His first season with the club, in 1952–53, saw relegation to the Second Division. In the final match against Derby County he chose to take a penalty awarded and missed, had he scored Stoke could have stayed up.

Despite this Thomson went on to make over 300 appearances for Stoke in all competitions before new manager Tony Waddington sold him to Middlesbrough in December 1959 for £8,500. He spent two seasons with Boro and ended his career with Hartlepools United.

== Personal life ==
His career was tinged with controversy surrounding his involvement in the 1964 British football match-fixing scandal which saw him jailed for six months. Thomson died of a heart attack in 1969 at the age of 39.

== Career statistics ==
Appearances and goals by club, season and competition
Club	Season	League			FA Cup		League Cup		Total	
Club	Season	Division	Apps	Goals	Apps	Goals	Apps	Goals	Apps	Goals
Aberdeen	1948–49	Scottish First Division	3	0	0	0	6	0	9	0
Aberdeen	1949–50	Scottish First Division	2	0	0	0	0	0	2	0
Aberdeen	1950–51	Scottish First Division	4	0	0	0	0	0	4	0
Aberdeen	1951–52	Scottish First Division	20	0	3	0	6	0	29	0
Aberdeen	1952–53	Scottish First Division	0	0	0	0	6	0	6	0
Aberdeen	Total		29	0	3	0	18	0	50	0
Stoke City	1952–53	First Division	38	2	2	0	—		40	2
Stoke City	1953–54	Second Division	40	2	3	0	—		43	2
Stoke City	1954–55	Second Division	41	0	6	1	—		47	1
Stoke City	1955–56	Second Division	37	0	5	0	—		42	0
Stoke City	1956–57	Second Division	40	0	1	0	—		41	0
Stoke City	1957–58	Second Division	37	0	5	0	—		42	0
Stoke City	1958–59	Second Division	38	2	2	0	—		40	2
Stoke City	1959–60	Second Division	7	0	0	0	—		7	0
Stoke City	Total		278	6	24	1	—		302	7
Middlesbrough	1959–60	Second Division	18	0	1	0	—		19	0
Middlesbrough	1960–61	Second Division	38	0	1	0	1	0	40	0
Middlesbrough	1961–62	Second Division	25	1	2	0	1	0	28	1
Middlesbrough	1962–63	Second Division	3	0	0	0	0	0	3	0
Middlesbrough	Total		84	1	4	0	2	0	90	1
Hartlepools United	1962–63	Fourth Division	28	2	1	0	0	0	29	2
Career total			419	9	32	1	20	0	471	10
