= Popwell =

Surname

Popwell is a surname. Notable people with the surname include:

- Albert Popwell (1926–1999), American actor
- Little Man Popwell (1912–1966), American poker player
- Robert Popwell (1950–2017), American jazz-funk bass guitarist and percussionist

== See also ==
- Powell (surname)
