= Poker in 1983 =

This article summarizes the events related to the world of poker in 1983.

== Major Tournaments ==
=== 1983 World Series of Poker ===
Tom McEvoy wins the main tournament, becoming the first player to win after qualifying for a satellite.

=== 1883 Super Bowl of Poker ===
Hans Lund wins the main tournament.

== Poker Hall of Fame ==
Joe Bernstein is inducted.
