= Jack Hedley (English footballer) =

English footballer

Personal information
- Full name: John Robert Hedley
- Date of birth: 11 December 1923
- Place of birth: Wallsend, England
- Date of death: 1985 (aged 61–62)
- Position: Full-back

Senior career*
Years	Team	Apps	(Gls)
- North Shields
1947–1950	Everton	54	(0)
1950–1959	Sunderland	269	(0)
1959–1960	Gateshead	11	(0)
- * Club domestic league appearances and goals

John Robert Hedley (born 1923) was an English footballer who played as a full-back for Sunderland between 1950 and 1959 whom he joined from Everton.
