= 1951–52 Stoke City F.C. season =

Stoke City
1951–52 season
- Chairman: Mr T. Preece
- Manager: Bob McGrory
- Stadium: Victoria Ground
- Football League First Division: 20th (31 Points)
- FA Cup: Fourth Round
- Top goalscorer: League: Sammy Smyth (12); All: Sammy Smyth (14)
- Highest home attendance: 43,205 vs Wolverhampton Wanderers (20 October 1951)
- Lowest home attendance: 10,993 vs Middlesbrough (3 May 1952)
- Average home league attendance: 25,791
Home colours

The 1951–52 season was Stoke City's 45th season in the Football League and the 31st in the First Division.

Stoke made a truly awful start to the 1951–52 season claiming just a single point from the first eleven matches. Results slowly started to improve and back-to-back home wins in the final two matches saw Stoke survive relegation.

== Season review ==
=== League ===
In the summer of 1951 there was a major change at boardroom level at Stoke as chairman Mr H. Booth stepped down after 15 years and Mr T. Preece took over in temporary charge. Stoke suffered an opening day mauling at Newcastle United losing 6–0 and it set the tone for a woeful start to the season as they took just two points from the first 22 on offer, finding themselves firmly bedded at the foot of the division. McGrory went out and spent £45,000 on three new players to arrest the decline, he exchanged Albert Mullard plus £10,000 for Alan Martin another £10,000 for Billy McIntosh and again smashed the club's transfer record with the purchase of Northern Irish striker Sammy Smyth for a fee of £25,000. Smyth certainly had the desired impact scoring 12 goals becoming top scorer for the season.

After these arrivals Stoke's form improved and with five straight wins Stoke caught up with the rest of the division however four defeats later they found themselves unable to pull away from a relegation fight. A cruel 5–4 defeat at home to Newcastle did not help, but Stoke somehow managed to take the fight to the final two matches of the season. Stoke had the worst goal average in the division but with both Fulham and Huddersfield Town in terrible form Stoke knew that two more wins would see them safe and that's what they managed leaving them three points clear of Huddersfield.

One interesting scoreline this season came in the League match at Villa Park on 16 February 1952. Aston Villa were on the fringe of forcing themselves in the title race but they came unstuck against a determined Stoke side and lost 3–2. On the scoresheet for the "Potters" was their goalkeeper Dennis Herod who had broken his arm earlier during the match and so swapped positions with left winger Sammy Smyth and went on to score the winning goal five minutes after half time.

=== FA Cup ===
After a good win over Sunderland in the third round Stoke were humbled by Third Division South side Swindon Town in a replay.

== Final league table ==
Pos	Team	Pld	W	D	L	GF	GA	GAv	Pts	Relegation
18	Middlesbrough	42	15	6	21	64	88	0.727	36	
19	Chelsea	42	14	8	20	52	72	0.722	36	
20	Stoke City	42	12	7	23	49	88	0.557	31	
21	Huddersfield Town (R)	42	10	8	24	49	82	0.598	28	Relegation to the Second Division
22	Fulham (R)	42	8	11	23	58	77	0.753	27	Relegation to the Second Division

Source: World Football
Rules for classification: 1) Points; 2) Goal average; 3) Goals scored
(R) Relegated

== Results ==
Stoke's score comes first

=== Legend ===
Win	Draw	Loss

=== Football League First Division ===
Match	Date	Opponent	Venue	Result	Attendance	Scorers
1	18 August 1951	Newcastle United	A	0–6	40,127	
2	20 August 1951	West Bromwich Albion	H	1–1	22,696	Oscroft
3	25 August 1951	Bolton Wanderers	H	1–2	22,442	Malkin
4	29 August 1951	West Bromwich Albion	A	0–1	18,903	
5	1 September 1951	Derby County	A	2–4	20,243	Oscroft, Mullard
6	3 September 1951	Fulham	H	1–1	21,000	Malkin
7	8 September 1951	Manchester United	A	0–4	43,660	
8	12 September 1951	Fulham	A	0–5	16,500	
9	15 September 1951	Tottenham Hotspur	H	1–6	27,000	Oscroft
10	17 September 1951	Charlton Athletic	H	1–2	17,500	McIntosh
11	22 September 1951	Preston North End	A	0–2	29,980	
12	29 September 1951	Burnley	H	2–1	28,577	Siddall, Martin
13	6 October 1951	Aston Villa	H	4–1	32,455	Smyth, Oscroft (2), Moss (o.g.)
14	13 October 1951	Sunderland	A	1–0	41,826	Smyth
15	20 October 1951	Wolverhampton Wanderers	H	1–0	43,205	Oscroft
16	27 October 1951	Huddersfield Town	A	2–0	19,495	Smyth (2)
17	3 November 1951	Chelsea	H	1–2	30,000	Smyth
18	10 November 1951	Portsmouth	A	1–4	30,223	Oscroft
19	17 November 1951	Liverpool	H	1–2	24,000	Smyth
20	24 November 1951	Blackpool	A	2–4	19,892	McIntosh (2)
21	1 December 1951	Arsenal	H	2–1	30,000	Sellars (2) (1 Pen)
22	8 December 1951	Manchester City	A	1–0	20,397	Smyth
23	15 December 1951	Newcastle United	H	4–5	25,393	Smyth (2), Oscroft, Siddall
24	22 December 1951	Bolton Wanderers	A	1–1	20,088	Smyth
25	26 December 1951	Middlesbrough	A	0–3	27,055	
26	29 December 1951	Derby County	H	3–1	27,000	Malkin, Oscroft, Smyth
27	5 January 1952	Manchester United	H	0–0	36,389	
28	19 January 1952	Tottenham Hotspur	A	0–2	45,176	
29	26 January 1952	Preston North End	H	0–0	25,000	
30	9 February 1952	Burnley	A	0–4	29,971	
31	16 February 1952	Aston Villa	A	3–2	40,000	Sellars, Oscroft, Herod
32	1 March 1952	Sunderland	H	1–1	24,208	Sellars
33	8 March 1952	Wolverhampton Wanderers	A	0–3	33,000	
34	15 March 1952	Huddersfield Town	H	0–0	19,000	
35	22 March 1952	Chelsea	A	0–1	30,000	
36	29 March 1952	Portsmouth	H	2–0	11,375	Martin, McIntosh
37	5 April 1952	Liverpool	A	1–2	30,000	McIntosh
38	12 April 1952	Blackpool	H	2–3	30,000	Martin, Siddall
39	14 April 1952	Charlton Athletic	A	0–4	20,000	
40	19 April 1952	Arsenal	A	1–4	47,962	Mountford (pen)
41	26 April 1952	Manchester City	H	3–1	25,000	Siddall, Smyth, Bowyer
42	3 May 1952	Middlesbrough	H	3–2	10,993	Brown (2), McCue

=== FA Cup ===
Round	Date	Opponent	Venue	Result	Attendance	Scorers
R3	12 January 1952	Sunderland	A	0–0	45,099	
R3 Replay	14 January 1952	Sunderland	H	3–1	31,841	Smyth, McIntosh, Malkin
R4	2 February 1952	Swindon Town	A	1–1	28,140	Smyth
R4 Replay	4 February 1952	Swindon Town	H	0–1	29,332	

== Squad statistics ==
Pos.	Name	League		FA Cup		Total	
Pos.	Name	Apps	Goals	Apps	Goals	Apps	Goals
GK	(England) Ray Evans	0	0	0	0	0	0
GK	(England) Dennis Herod	29	1	4	0	33	1
GK	(England) Norman Wilkinson	13	0	0	0	13	0
DF	(England) Roy Beckett	3	0	0	0	3	0
DF	(England) Eric Hampson	5	0	0	0	5	0
DF	(England) John McCue	42	1	4	0	46	1
DF	(England) Billy Mould	23	0	4	0	27	0
DF	(England) Cyril Watkin	11	0	0	0	11	0
MF	(England) Roy Brown	15	2	0	0	15	2
MF	(Scotland) Jock Kirton	41	0	4	0	45	0
MF	(England) Frank Mountford	28	1	3	0	31	1
MF	(England) John Sellars	23	4	4	0	27	4
FW	(England) Stan Bevans	2	0	0	0	2	0
FW	(England) Frank Bowyer	15	1	4	0	19	1
FW	(Scotland) Leslie Johnston	9	0	0	0	9	0
FW	(England) John Malkin	28	4	4	1	32	5
FW	(England) Alan Martin	34	2	4	0	38	2
FW	(Scotland) Billy McIntosh	24	5	1	1	25	6
FW	(England) George Mountford	21	0	0	0	21	0
FW	(England) Albert Mullard	7	1	0	0	7	1
FW	(England) Alexander Ormston	2	0	0	0	2	0
FW	(England) Harry Oscroft	40	10	4	0	44	10
FW	(England) Brian Siddall	20	4	0	0	20	4
FW	(Northern Ireland) Sammy Smyth	26	12	4	2	30	14
FW	(England) Donald Whiston	1	0	0	0	1	0
–	Own goals	–	1	–	0	–	1
