= John Malkin =

English footballer

Personal information
- Full name: John Malkin
- Date of birth: 9 November 1925
- Place of birth: Longton, England
- Date of death: 19 May 1994 (aged 68)
- Place of death: Stoke-on-Trent, England
- Position: Winger

Youth career
- Queensbury Road School
- 1941–1943: Army Football

Senior career*
Years	Team	Apps	(Gls)
1947–1956	Stoke City	175	(24)
- * Club domestic league appearances and goals

John Malkin (9 November 1925 – 19 May 1994) was an English footballer who played in the Football League for Stoke City.

== Career ==
Malkin was born in Stoke-on-Trent and was spotted by scouts in 1942 playing football in the Army and was signed by his local club Stoke City. Malkin was a winger who had the daunting task of replacing the role of Stanley Matthews in the number 7 shirt, after he joined Blackpool in 1947. He made his debut against Everton in March 1948 but didn't become a regular first team player until the 1949–50 season where he made 29 appearances. Injury kept Malkin out for most of the 1950–51 season but he did make a return for the poor 1951–52 and 1952–53 campaigns which saw Stoke relegated to the Second Division. He scored 11 goals in 42 matches in 1953–54 his best performance in his career and spent two more season in the squad before retiring due to injury. He also enjoyed a brief spell as coach for Stoke City following his injury.

== After football ==
After leaving competitive football, Malkin started work for the Royal Mail. In 1994 Malkin died of cancer.

== Career statistics ==
Appearances and goals by club, season and competition
Club	Season	League			FA Cup		Total	
Club	Season	Division	Apps	Goals	Apps	Goals	Apps	Goals
Stoke City	1947–48	First Division	5	1	0	0	5	1
Stoke City	1948–49	First Division	6	0	0	0	6	0
Stoke City	1949–50	First Division	28	1	1	0	29	1
Stoke City	1950–51	First Division	8	0	0	0	8	0
Stoke City	1951–52	First Division	28	4	4	1	32	5
Stoke City	1952–53	First Division	24	2	2	0	26	2
Stoke City	1953–54	Second Division	39	10	3	1	42	11
Stoke City	1954–55	Second Division	26	4	5	1	31	5
Stoke City	1955–56	Second Division	11	2	0	0	11	2
Career total			175	24	15	3	190	27
