= Joseph Hutton (playwright) =

American playwright and actor (1787–1828)

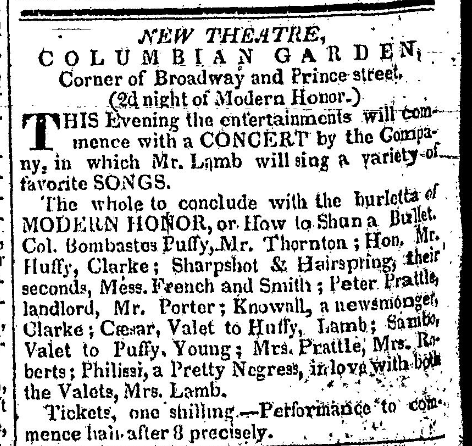
Ad in the New York Evening Post for the Columbian Garden theatre on July 7, 1823, which has Hutton's Modern Honor, or How to Shun a Bullet on the bill.

Joseph Hutton (February 25, 1787 – January 31, 1828) was an American playwright and actor.

== Biography ==
Hutton was born on February 25, 1878, in Philadelphia, and was employed as a schoolmaster while becoming a playwright. He also wrote prose and poems. His first comedy appears to have been The School for Prodigals, which debuted at the Chestnut Street Theatre in Philadelphia in 1808. He only moved into acting as well some years later.

After leaving the theater world, what he did is said in some sources to be unclear, but he appears to have moved to New Bern, North Carolina in 1823, where he taught, and also contributed to the local newspaper. He died there on January 31, 1828, aged 40, despite at least one source incorrectly saying he died out west.

An article in The London Magazine in 1826 on American dramatists, while cautioning that no American play "of commanding merit" had yet to appear, did include a paragraph on Hutton. And in 1829, critic Samuel Kettell wrote that Hutton's "writings seldom rise above mediocrity, but many of his productions are agreeable. His talents were rather imitative than creative." In 1918, Perley Isaac Reed listed Hutton as one of a group of five he called the best American playwrights of 1805–15, albeit during an era when homegrown plays were disfavored in America as compared to English works. In 1925, Volume 2 of Representative Plays by American Dramatists by Montrose Jonas Moses, covering the years 1815–1858, was published. The collection of ten plays leads off with Hutton's Fashionable Follies (1815).

== Plays ==
- The School for Prodigals (1808) (comedy)
- The Orphan of Prague (1808)
- The Wounded Hussar; or The Rightful Heir (1809) (musical piece)
- Fashionable Follies (~1810; revised 1815)
- Modern Honor, or How to Shun a Bullet (1822) ("Dodge" in some sources instead of "Shun") (about a duel between George McDuffie and William Cumming)

== Other works ==
- Don Guiscardo (story)
- Ardennis (story)
- The Castle of Altenheim (story)
- Leisure Hours (1812; poems)
- Field of Orleans (poem)
- The Battle on the Wabash, or the Demon of the Cave (1813) (melodramatic pantomime)
