= Ray Evans (footballer, born 1929) =

English footballer

Personal information
- Full name: Raymond Frederick Evans
- Date of birth: 8 October 1929
- Place of birth: Carlisle, England
- Date of death: 2005 (aged 75–76)
- Position: Goalkeeper

Senior career*
Years	Team	Apps	(Gls)
1947–1948	Hightown Youth Club		
1948–1951	Crewe Alexandra	20	(0)
1951–1952	Stoke City	0	(0)
1955–1956	Crewe Alexandra	0	(0)
Total		20	(0)
- * Club domestic league appearances and goals

Raymond Frederick Evans (8 October 1929 – 2005) was an English professional footballer who played in the Football League for Crewe Alexandra.

== Career statistics ==
Appearances and goals by club, season and competition
Club	Season	League			FA Cup		Total	
Club	Season	Division	Apps	Goals	Apps	Goals	Apps	Goals
Crewe Alexandra	1948–49	Third Division North	18	0	3	0	21	0
Crewe Alexandra	1949–50	Third Division North	0	0	0	0	0	0
Crewe Alexandra	1950–51	Third Division North	2	0	0	0	2	0
Crewe Alexandra	Total		20	0	3	0	23	0
Stoke City	1951–52	First Division	0	0	0	0	0	0
Crewe Alexandra	1955–56	Third Division North	0	0	0	0	0	0
Career total			20	0	3	0	23	0
