= Bill Robertson (English footballer) =

English footballer (1923-2003)

Personal information
- Full name: William Harold Robertson
- Date of birth: 25 March 1923
- Place of birth: Crowthorne, England
- Date of death: 15 March 2003 (aged 79)
- Place of death: Hanworth, England
- Position: Goalkeeper

Youth career
- Crowthorne BC
- Camberley ATC

Senior career*
Years	Team	Apps	(Gls)
- RAF Lossiemouth
1945–1948	Chelsea	37	(0)
1948–1952	Birmingham City	2	(0)
1952–1960	Stoke City	238	(0)
Total		277	(0)
- * Club domestic league appearances and goals

William Harold Robertson (25 March 1923 – 15 March 2003) was an English professional footballer who played in the Football League for Chelsea, Birmingham City and Stoke City. He played as a goalkeeper.

== Career ==
Robertson was born in Crowthorne, Berkshire. In youth football he played as a centre forward, only switching to goalkeeping while in the Royal Air Force stationed at Lossiemouth during the Second World War. He signed for Chelsea in October 1945, and played 43 times in all competitions for the first team before moving to Birmingham City in December 1948. This move failed to improve matters, as Robertson found himself behind Gil Merrick in the pecking order and played just three times in 3 1/2 years.

He became new Stoke City manager Frank Taylor's first signing in the summer of 1952 as he saw him as a replacement for the ageing Dennis Herod. He had an awful first season with the club breaking his leg against Manchester City on 20 December 1952 after 19 matches during which time he had conceded 38 goals and the 1952–53 season ended with relegation to the Second Division. He recovered from his injury and became first choice 'keeper under Taylor as Stoke failed to gain a return to the top-flight, narrowly missed out in 1954–55, 1956–57 and 1958–59 finishing 5th three times. Stoke had an awful 1959–60 campaign which saw Taylor sacked by the board and new manager Tony Waddington signed Everton's Jimmy O'Neill and Robertson decided to retire.

After retirement from football he kept a newsagents' in Bucknell, Shropshire, before returning to the south of England in 1963. He moved to Hanworth, Middlesex, where he again kept a newsagents' shop until his retirement.

== Career statistics ==
Club	Season	Division	League		FA Cup		Total	
Club	Season	Division	Apps	Goals	Apps	Goals	Apps	Goals
Chelsea	1945–46	–	0	0	6	0	6	0
Chelsea	1946–47	First Division	22	0	0	0	22	0
Chelsea	1947–48	First Division	15	0	0	0	15	0
Chelsea	Total		37	0	6	0	43	0
Birmingham City	1948–49	First Division	1	0	1	0	2	0
Birmingham City	1949–50	First Division	0	0	0	0	0	0
Birmingham City	1950–51	Second Division	0	0	0	0	0	0
Birmingham City	1951–52	Second Division	1	0	0	0	1	0
Birmingham City	Total		2	0	1	0	3	0
Stoke City	1952–53	First Division	19	0	0	0	19	0
Stoke City	1953–54	Second Division	32	0	3	0	35	0
Stoke City	1954–55	Second Division	41	0	1	0	42	0
Stoke City	1955–56	Second Division	36	0	5	0	41	0
Stoke City	1956–57	Second Division	42	0	1	0	43	0
Stoke City	1957–58	Second Division	18	0	0	0	18	0
Stoke City	1958–59	Second Division	31	0	0	0	31	0
Stoke City	1959–60	Second Division	19	0	2	0	21	0
Stoke City	Total		238	0	12	0	250	0
Career total			277	0	19	0	296	0
