= Leslie Johnston =

Scottish footballer

Personal information
- Full name: Leslie Hamilton Johnston
- Date of birth: 16 August 1920
- Place of birth: Glasgow, Scotland
- Date of death: 19 October 2001 (aged 81)
- Place of death: Newcastle-under-Lyme, England
- Position: Inside forward

Youth career
- Clydebank Juniors

Senior career*
Years	Team	Apps	(Gls)
1941–1947	Clyde	24	(15)
1947	Hibernian	9	(8)
1947–1948	Clyde	30	(17)
1948–1949	Celtic	23	(8)
1949–1953	Stoke City	88	(22)
1953–1954	Shrewsbury Town	16	(6)
Total		190	(76)

International career
1945	Scotland (wartime)	1	(1)
1948	Scotland	2	(1)
- * Club domestic league appearances and goals

Leslie Hamilton Johnston (16 August 1920 – 19 October 2001) was a Scottish footballer who played for Clydebank Juniors, Clyde, Hibernian, Celtic, Stoke City, Shrewsbury Town and the Scotland national team.

== Club career ==
Johnston was born in Glasgow. He moved to Clyde from Clydebank Juniors in December 1941 before joining Hibernian in February 1947 for £10,000, a then Scottish football transfer record. However, he rejoined Clyde just eight months later for the same transfer fee. He joined Celtic the following year for £12,000, another Scottish transfer record. He remained with Celtic for just one year, before moving to English club Stoke City for £9,000. He struggled in his first season at the Victoria Ground scoring just five goals in 1949–50. He improved in 1950–51 scoring 13 goals but again struggled to find his form and missed a lot a games due to injury. He was released in May 1953 and he went to play for Shrewsbury Town.

== International career ==
During his second spell at Clyde, Johnston earned two caps for Scotland. He scored in the second of his caps, a 2–1 defeat to Switzerland in May 1948. He had also played for Scotland in one wartime International.

== Career statistics ==
=== Club ===
Appearances and goals by club, season and competition
Club	Season	League			FA Cup		League Cup		Total	
Club	Season	Division	Apps	Goals	Apps	Goals	Apps	Goals	Apps	Goals
Clyde	1946–47	Scottish First Division	24	15	1	1	4	2	29	18
Clyde	1947–48	Scottish First Division	23	14	1	0	0	0	24	14
Clyde	1948–49	Scottish First Division	7	3	0	0	3	0	10	3
Clyde	Total		54	32	2	1	7	2	63	35
Hibernian	1946–47	Scottish First Division	5	3	0	0	0	0	5	3
Hibernian	1947–48	Scottish First Division	4	5	0	0	5	4	9	9
Hibernian	Total		9	8	0	0	5	4	14	12
Celtic	1948–49	Scottish First Division	23	8	1	0	0	0	24	8
Celtic	1949–50	Scottish First Division	1	0	0	0	4	0	5	0
Celtic	Total		24	8	1	0	4	0	29	8
Stoke City	1949–50	First Division	27	5	1	0	—		28	5
Stoke City	1950–51	First Division	38	13	3	0	—		41	13
Stoke City	1951–52	First Division	9	0	0	0	—		9	0
Stoke City	1952–53	First Division	14	4	0	0	—		14	4
Stoke City	Total		88	22	4	0	—		92	22
Shrewsbury Town	1953–54	Third Division South	16	6	1	0	—		17	6
Career Total			191	76	8	1	16	6	215	83

=== International ===
National team	Year	Apps	Goals
Scotland	1948	2	1
Total		2	1

== Honours ==
Clyde

- Glasgow Cup: 1946–47
