= Joe Hutton (footballer) =

Scottish footballer

Personal information
- Full name: Joseph Hutton
- Date of birth: 18 November 1927
- Place of birth: Dundee, Scotland
- Date of death: April 1999 (aged 72)
- Place of death: Wallingford, England
- Position: Inside forward

Senior career*
Years	Team	Apps	(Gls)
1949–1951	Reading	8	(0)
1951–1953	Ayr United	51	(18)
1953–1956	Stoke City	34	(7)
1957–1958	Gillingham	36	(6)
1958–1960	Millwall	24	(9)
–	Poole Town		
Total		153	(40)
- * Club domestic league appearances and goals

Joseph Hutton (18 November 1927 – April 1999) was a Scottish footballer who played in the English Football League for Gillingham, Millwall, Reading and Stoke City.

== Career ==
Hutton was born in Dundee and began his career in England with Reading. He only made eight appearances for the "Royals" before going back to Scotland to play for Ayr United. He and Ayr team-mate Bobby Cairns joined Stoke City in 1953. Hutton made an instant impact at the Victoria Ground scoring in his first three matches for the club. However Hutton was more of a creator than an out and out goal scorer but his Stoke career took at hit when he broke his leg against Blackburn Rovers on 19 March 1955. He only made a few more appearances thereafter and left for Gillingham in 1957. He spent the 1957–58 season with the "Gills" as they suffered relegation to the Fourth Division and he left for Millwall. After two seasons at Millwall he ended his career with non-league Poole Town.

== Career statistics ==
Appearances and goals by club, season and competition
Club	Season	League			FA Cup		Total	
Club	Season	Division	Apps	Goals	Apps	Goals	Apps	Goals
Reading	1949–50	Third Division South	2	0	0	0	2	0
Reading	1950–51	Third Division South	6	0	0	0	6	0
Stoke City	1953–54	Second Division	7	2	3	1	10	3
Stoke City	1954–55	Second Division	19	5	0	0	19	5
Stoke City	1955–56	Second Division	1	0	0	0	1	0
Stoke City	1956–57	Second Division	7	0	0	0	7	0
Gillingham	1957–58	Third Division South	36	6	2	1	38	7
Millwall	1958–59	Fourth Division	22	9	2	1	24	10
Millwall	1959–60	Fourth Division	2	0	0	0	2	0
Career total			102	22	7	3	109	25
