= Brian Doyle (footballer) =

English footballer

Personal information
- Full name: Joseph Brian Doyle
- Date of birth: 15 July 1930
- Place of birth: Salford, England
- Date of death: 22 December 1992 (aged 62)
- Position: Defender

Senior career*
Years	Team	Apps	(Gls)
1949	Lostock Green		
1949–1950	Manchester City	0	(0)
1950–1953	Stoke City	17	(0)
1954–1957	Exeter City	100	(0)
1957–1960	Bristol Rovers	43	(1)
Total		160	(1)

Managerial career
- 1968–1971: Workington
- 1972–1974: Stockport County
- * Club domestic league appearances and goals

Joseph Brian Doyle (15 July 1930 – 22 December 1992) was a footballer who played in the Football League for Bristol Rovers, Exeter City and Stoke City. After finishing his playing career Doyle went into coaching and became manager at Stockport County and Workington.

== Career ==
Doyle was born in Salford and played for amateur side Lostock Green before joining Manchester City in 1949 but he left for Stoke City without playing a match. He broke into the first team at the Victoria Ground in 1952–53 and played 19 times but injury kept him out of the following season and once he recovered manager Frank Taylor deemed him surplus to requirements and he left for Exeter City. He enjoyed a good three-year spell at St James Park under the management of Norman Dodgin and made just over 100 appearances. He then had a less successful three year seasons at Bristol Rovers making 44 appearances but he did scored his only career goal for the club. Doyle then went into coaching and later became manager of Workington (1968–1971) and Stockport County (1972–1974).

== Career statistics ==
Club	Season	League			FA Cup		Total	
Club	Season	Division	Apps	Goals	Apps	Goals	Apps	Goals
Stoke City	1952–53	First Division	17	0	2	0	19	0
Stoke City	1953–54	Second Division	0	0	0	0	0	0
Exeter City	1954–55	Third Division South	39	0	1	0	40	0
Exeter City	1955–56	Third Division South	33	0	2	0	35	0
Exeter City	1956–57	Third Division South	28	0	1	0	29	0
Bristol Rovers	1957–58	Second Division	9	0	0	0	9	0
Bristol Rovers	1958–59	Second Division	29	0	1	0	30	0
Bristol Rovers	1959–60	Second Division	5	1	0	0	5	1
Career Total			160	1	7	0	167	1
