= 1950–51 Stoke City F.C. season =

Stoke City
1950–51 season
- Chairman: Mr H. Booth
- Manager: Bob McGrory
- Stadium: Victoria Ground
- Football League First Division: 13th (40 Points)
- FA Cup: Fifth Round
- Top goalscorer: League: Frank Bowyer (16); All: Frank Bowyer (19)
- Highest home attendance: 40,012 vs Arsenal (26 December 1950)
- Lowest home attendance: 19,004 vs Middlesbrough (26 March 1951)
- Average home league attendance: 25,791
Home colours

The 1950–51 season was Stoke City's 44th season in the Football League and the 30th in the First Division.

Stoke were rocked before the start of the season by the news that Neil Franklin and George Mountford had agreed to play for Independiente Santa Fe in Colombia. The transfer caused uproar amongst the FA and the pair were later punished. Stoke were again unimpressive as they finished in a mid table position of 13th.

== Season review ==
=== League ===
Stoke were rocked before the start of the season by the news that Neil Franklin and George Mountford had agreed to play for Independiente Santa Fe in Colombia. The South American country at this time was not under the jurisdiction of FIFA and the two players came under heavy criticism, and Franklin was stripped from England international duties. However, despite the pair making a big impression on Colombian football the country was at a state of civil unrest and two months later Franklin returned to England. He never played for Stoke again and ended up with Hull City whilst George Mountford finished the season with Santa Fe and returned to Stoke.

The summer activities were still the gossip as the 1950–51 season opened with only one new signing at the Victoria Ground, goalkeeper Don Clegg who had an unsuccessful career. Jock Kirton was made captain and most fans lacked confidence in the squad now minus to key players. McGrory stated that his team was good enough for First Division football but admitted that he would have liked to bring in more players to the club. With the season five days old McGrory paid £8,000 on Crewe Alexandra forward Albert Mullard however in his first game for Stoke he injured his knee and suffered a lengthy lay-off.

Stoke had a season of mixed fortunes and whilst they were certainly good enough to stay out of relegation trouble they lacked the quality to claim a top half finished and ended up in 13th position which was not as bad as some of the supporters made out.

=== FA Cup ===
Stoke drew local rivals Port Vale in the third round and the two sides served up a thrilling cup tie. The initial clash with Vale took place on a heavy Victoria Ground pitch was seen by over 48,000 fans. In an entertaining first half Alan Bennett put Vale into the lead after six minutes and although Stoke pushed hard for an equaliser they couldn't beat Ray King. Then the Vale fans were celebrating again as their side went 2–0 up, Cliff Pinchbeck scoring after 45 seconds into the second half. Stoke were rattled and soon after Albert Mullard pulled one back with a crisp shot from the edge of the area and he then scored again to set up a frantic finale. However, with both teams battling it out in the mud the match finished in a fair draw. With Vale Park waterlogged it was back to the Victoria Ground and was again a tense encounter. Vale were the better team creating the most chances but with just seconds remaining Frank Bowyer who had been kept quite by the "Valiants" defence suddenly found space and headed in a Harry Oscroft cross to end the tie.

Stoke then beat West Ham United before losing 4–2 against Newcastle United in front of 48,500 at the Vic.

== Final league table ==
Pos	Team	Pld	W	D	L	GF	GA	GAv	Pts
11	Derby County	42	16	8	18	81	75	1.080	40
12	Sunderland	42	12	16	14	63	73	0.863	40
13	Stoke City	42	13	14	15	50	59	0.847	40
14	Wolverhampton Wanderers	42	15	8	19	74	61	1.213	38
15	Aston Villa	42	12	13	17	66	68	0.971	37

Source: World Football
Rules for classification: 1) Points; 2) Goal average; 3) Goals scored

== Results ==
Stoke's score comes first

=== Legend ===
Win	Draw	Loss

=== Football League First Division ===
Match	Date	Opponent	Venue	Result	Attendance	Scorers
1	19 August 1950	Newcastle United	H	1–2	28,000	Bowyer
2	23 August 1950	Huddersfield Town	A	1–3	14,075	Johnston
3	26 August 1950	West Bromwich Albion	A	1–1	34,000	Johnston
4	28 August 1950	Huddersfield Town	H	0–1	21,776	
5	2 September 1950	Derby County	H	4–1	28,000	Bowyer, Brown, Johnston (2)
6	4 September 1950	Sheffield Wednesday	A	1–1	35,700	Johnston
7	9 September 1950	Everton	H	2–0	28,000	Johnston (2)
8	11 September 1950	Sheffield Wednesday	H	1–1	23,272	Brown
9	16 September 1950	Portsmouth	A	1–5	30,000	Bowyer
10	23 September 1950	Chelsea	H	2–1	26,000	Johnston, Oscroft
11	30 September 1950	Burnley	A	1–1	23,776	Bowyer
12	7 October 1950	Liverpool	A	0–0	40,239	
13	14 October 1950	Fulham	H	1–1	27,000	Ormston
14	21 October 1950	Tottenham Hotspur	A	1–6	54,124	Ormston
15	28 October 1950	Charlton Athletic	H	2–0	25,000	Bowyer (2)
16	4 November 1950	Bolton Wanderers	A	1–1	33,000	Ball (o.g.)
17	11 November 1950	Blackpool	H	1–0	39,994	Mountford (pen)
18	18 November 1950	Manchester United	A	0–0	30,031	
19	25 November 1950	Wolverhampton Wanderers	H	0–1	35,000	
20	2 December 1950	Sunderland	A	1–1	36,137	Bowyer
21	9 December 1950	Aston Villa	H	1–0	29,998	Oscroft
22	16 December 1950	Newcastle United	A	1–3	25,067	Brown
23	23 December 1950	West Bromwich Albion	H	1–1	19,811	Bowyer
24	25 December 1950	Arsenal	A	3–0	38,224	Bowyer, Johnston, Brown
25	26 December 1950	Arsenal	H	1–0	40,012	Bowyer
26	30 December 1950	Derby County	A	1–1	25,034	Bowyer
27	13 January 1951	Everton	A	3–0	35,542	Bowyer, Johnston, Beckett
28	20 January 1951	Portsmouth	H	1–2	23,455	Johnston
29	3 February 1951	Chelsea	A	1–1	25,224	Bowyer
30	17 February 1951	Burnley	H	0–0	20,823	
31	24 February 1951	Liverpool	H	2–3	22,216	Johnston (2)
32	3 March 1951	Fulham	A	0–2	34,768	
33	10 March 1951	Tottenham Hotspur	H	0–0	24,236	
34	17 March 1951	Charlton Athletic	A	0–2	15,091	
35	23 March 1951	Middlesbrough	A	0–1	36,239	
36	24 March 1951	Bolton Wanderers	H	2–1	20,027	Bowyer (2)
37	26 March 1951	Middlesbrough	H	2–0	19,004	Oscroft (2)
38	31 March 1951	Blackpool	A	0–3	27,122	
39	7 April 1951	Manchester United	H	2–0	25,690	Oscroft, Mullard
40	14 April 1951	Wolverhampton Wanderers	A	3–2	30,040	Oscroft, Clowes (2)
41	21 April 1951	Sunderland	H	2–4	20,190	Mountford (pen), Hedley (o.g.)
42	5 May 1951	Aston Villa	A	2–6	24,986	Mullard, Bowyer

=== FA Cup ===
Round	Date	Opponent	Venue	Result	Attendance	Scorers
R3	6 January 1951	Port Vale	H	2–2	48,000	Mullard (2)
R3 Replay	8 January 1951	Port Vale	H	1–0	40,903	Bowyer
R4	29 January 1951	West Ham United	H	1–0	47,929	Bowyer
R5	10 February 1951	Newcastle United	H	2–4	48,500	Bowyer 57', Mountford (pen) 76'

== Squad statistics ==
Pos.	Name	League		FA Cup		Total	
Pos.	Name	Apps	Goals	Apps	Goals	Apps	Goals
GK	(England) Don Clegg	2	0	0	0	2	0
GK	(England) Dennis Herod	35	0	3	0	38	0
GK	(England) Norman Wilkinson	5	0	1	0	6	0
DF	(England) Roy Beckett	3	1	1	0	4	1
DF	(England) Eric Hampson	1	0	0	0	1	0
DF	(England) John McCue	39	0	4	0	43	0
DF	(England) Billy Mould	20	0	4	0	24	0
DF	(Scotland) George Mulholland	3	0	0	0	3	0
DF	(England) Cyril Watkin	22	0	0	0	22	0
MF	(England) John Brooks	2	0	0	0	2	0
MF	(Scotland) Jock Kirton	39	0	4	0	43	0
MF	(England) Frank Mountford	42	2	3	1	45	3
MF	(England) John Sellars	41	0	4	0	45	0
FW	(England) Stan Bevans	2	0	0	0	2	0
FW	(England) Frank Bowyer	39	16	4	3	43	19
FW	(England) Roy Brown	26	4	3	0	29	4
FW	(England) John Clowes	2	2	0	0	2	2
FW	(England) Dennis Hughes	1	0	0	0	1	0
FW	(Scotland) Leslie Johnston	38	13	3	0	41	13
FW	(England) John Malkin	8	0	0	0	8	0
FW	(England) Albert Mullard	14	2	2	2	16	4
FW	(England) Harry Oscroft	35	6	4	0	39	6
FW	(England) Alexander Ormston	35	2	4	0	39	2
FW	(England) Brian Siddall	8	0	0	0	8	0
–	Own goals	–	2	–	0	–	2
