= 1952–53 Stoke City F.C. season =

Stoke City
1952–53 season
- Chairman: Mr E. Henshall
- Manager: Frank Taylor
- Stadium: Victoria Ground
- Football League First Division: 21st (34 Points)
- FA Cup: Fourth Round
- Top goalscorer: League: Harry Oscroft (10); All: Harry Oscroft (10)
- Highest home attendance: 35,006 vs Manchester City (23 August 1952)
- Lowest home attendance: 19,611 vs Sunderland (28 March 1953)
- Average home league attendance: 27,883
Home colours

The 1952–53 season was Stoke City's 46th season in the Football League and the 32nd in the First Division.

The summer of 1952 again brought drama as long serving manager Bob McGrory resigned after spending 31 years with the club as player and manager. In his place came former Scarborough manager and Wolverhampton Wanderers defender Frank Taylor. However despite a change in leadership the team continued to struggle and were again involved in a relegation battle. The season went to the final day and Stoke went into their match against Derby County knowing they had to win to stay up, a 2–1 defeat saw Stoke's stay in the First Division come to a disappointing end.

== Season review ==
=== League ===
During the summer of 1952 Bob McGrory resigned after spending 31 years at the Victoria Ground as player and manager and Frank Taylor took over as first team manager. Taylor was a 'new breed' of tracksuit manager and was regarded as potential great manager by the Stoke board. The first act Taylor did was to erect a sign above the players dressing room which read: Are you 90 minutes fit? It's the last 20 minutes that count–train for it.

The 1952–53 season was obviously going to be a transitional one with the defence and forward lines in need of strengthening. A new goalkeeper was brought in, Bill Robertson coming up from Birmingham City for £8,000. The season did not start well and after one win the first five matches Taylor moved quickly to bring in Ken Thomson to the club a fine centre back from Aberdeen whilst allowing George Mountford to join Queens Park Rangers. Taylor also started to move on some of McGrory's signings but the talent from the youth team which had served Stoke for so long had now dried up.

Prior to the lead up to 1953 Stoke had agonisingly slipped into the relegation zone, but seven games without defeat at the turn of the year they seemed to have averted the danger. But then it all went wrong again and they slipped back down the table and in the end they had to win their final match of the season against an already relegated Derby County at the Victoria Ground. Most expected Stoke to step it up and beat a dejected Derby side but disaster struck as Jack Lee scored for the "Rams" early on. Stoke hit back through Frank Bowyer but Jackie Stamps but Derby 2–1 up. Stoke created plenty of chances and with just minutes left were awarded a penalty but the reliable Ken Thomson hit his kick straight at Ray Middleton and with it ended Stoke's 20 year stay in the First Division.

=== FA Cup ===
A miserable season was not helped any by a shock 1–0 defeat to Third Division North side Halifax Town in the fourth round.

== Final league table ==
Pos	Team	Pld	W	D	L	GF	GA	GAv	Pts	Relegation
18	Sheffield Wednesday	42	12	11	19	62	72	0.861	35	
19	Chelsea	42	12	11	19	56	66	0.848	35	
20	Manchester City	42	14	7	21	72	87	0.828	35	
21	Stoke City (R)	42	12	10	20	53	66	0.803	34	Relegation to the Second Division
22	Derby County (R)	42	11	10	21	59	74	0.797	32	Relegation to the Second Division

Source: World Football
Rules for classification: 1) Points; 2) Goal average; 3) Goals scored
(R) Relegated

== Results ==
Stoke's score comes first

=== Legend ===
Win	Draw	Loss

=== Football League First Division ===
Match	Date	Opponent	Venue	Result	Attendance	Scorers
1	23 August 1952	Manchester City	H	2–1	35,006	Smyth, Oscroft
2	26 August 1952	Burnley	A	2–3	29,087	Smyth, Oscroft
3	30 August 1952	Liverpool	A	2–3	40,062	Bowyer, Johnston
4	1 September 1952	Burnley	H	1–3	40,062	Oscroft
5	6 September 1952	Middlesbrough	H	1–0	32,061	Johnston
6	10 September 1952	Preston North End	A	0–3	35,275	
7	13 September 1952	West Bromwich Albion	A	2–3	27,028	Johnston, Mountford (pen)
8	15 September 1952	Preston North End	H	0–0	28,436	
9	20 September 1952	Newcastle United	H	1–0	32,359	Johnston
10	27 September 1952	Cardiff City	A	0–2	40,271	
11	4 October 1952	Sheffield Wednesday	H	1–3	29,627	Sellars
12	11 October 1952	Manchester United	A	2–0	28,968	Siddall, Finney
13	18 October 1952	Portsmouth	H	2–4	29,057	Finney, Smyth
14	25 October 1952	Bolton Wanderers	A	1–2	25,294	Finney
15	1 November 1952	Aston Villa	H	1–4	26,652	Smyth
16	8 November 1952	Sunderland	A	1–1	43,444	Mountford (pen)
17	15 November 1952	Wolverhampton Wanderers	H	1–2	28,410	Smyth
18	22 November 1952	Charlton Athletic	A	1–5	12,143	Mountford (pen)
19	29 November 1952	Arsenal	H	1–1	24,033	Malkin
20	6 December 1952	Derby County	A	0–4	17,484	
21	13 December 1952	Blackpool	H	4–0	19,382	Oscroft (2), Mountford, Fenton (o.g.)
22	20 December 1952	Manchester City	A	1–2	13,562	Whiston
23	26 December 1952	Chelsea	H	1–1	30,846	Malkin
24	27 December 1952	Chelsea	A	0–0	17,173	
25	3 January 1953	Liverpool	H	3–1	23,488	Oscroft (2), Whiston
26	17 January 1953	Middlesbrough	A	0–0	20,320	
27	24 January 1953	West Bromwich Albion	H	5–1	35,226	Oscroft (2), Martin (2), Bowyer
28	7 February 1953	Newcastle United	A	2–1	25,115	Martin, Finney
29	14 February 1953	Cardiff City	H	0–0	21,619	
30	21 February 1953	Sheffield Wednesday	A	0–1	40,209	
31	28 February 1953	Manchester United	H	3–1	30,219	Brown (2), Martin
32	7 March 1953	Portsmouth	A	1–1	25,370	Oscroft
33	14 March 1953	Bolton Wanderers	H	1–2	28,232	Brown
34	25 March 1953	Aston Villa	A	1–1	15,056	Thomson
35	28 March 1953	Sunderland	H	3–0	19,611	Brown (2), Connor
36	3 April 1953	Tottenham Hotspur	A	0–1	35,606	
37	4 April 1953	Wolverhampton Wanderers	A	0–3	38,000	
38	6 April 1953	Tottenham Hotspur	H	2–0	25,346	Brown, Thomson
39	11 April 1953	Charlton Athletic	H	1–0	27,087	Brown
40	15 April 1953	Blackpool	A	1–1	13,280	Mountford
41	18 April 1953	Arsenal	A	1–3	47,376	Brown
42	25 April 1953	Derby County	H	1–2	29,597	Bowyer

=== FA Cup ===
Round	Date	Opponent	Venue	Result	Attendance	Scorers
R3	10 January 1953	Wrexham	H	2–1	36,361	Finney, Whiston
R4	31 January 1953	Halifax Town	A	0–1	34,788	

== Squad statistics ==
Pos.	Name	League		FA Cup		Total	
Pos.	Name	Apps	Goals	Apps	Goals	Apps	Goals
GK	(Wales) Frank Elliott	12	0	1	0	13	0
GK	(England) Dennis Herod	11	0	1	0	12	0
GK	(England) Bill Robertson	19	0	0	0	19	0
GK	(Wales) Billy Waters	0	0	0	0	0	0
DF	(England) Roy Beckett	4	0	0	0	4	0
DF	(England) George Bourne	20	0	0	0	20	0
DF	(England) Brian Doyle	17	0	2	0	19	0
DF	(England) John McCue	36	0	2	0	38	0
DF	(Scotland) Ken Thomson	38	2	2	0	40	2
MF	(England) Des Farrow	3	0	0	0	3	0
MF	(Scotland) Jock Kirton	3	0	0	0	3	0
MF	(England) Frank Mountford	37	5	2	0	39	5
MF	(England) John Sellars	37	1	2	0	39	1
FW	(England) Frank Bowyer	29	3	2	0	31	3
FW	(England) Roy Brown	16	8	0	0	16	8
FW	(England) Harold Connor	2	1	0	0	2	1
FW	(England) Bill Finney	21	4	1	1	22	5
FW	(Scotland) Leslie Johnston	14	4	0	0	14	4
FW	(England) John Malkin	24	2	2	0	26	2
FW	(Scotland) Billy McIntosh	2	0	0	0	2	0
FW	(England) Alan Martin	29	4	1	0	30	4
FW	(England) Jack McClelland	4	0	0	0	4	0
FW	(England) George Mountford	4	0	0	0	4	0
FW	(England) Harry Oscroft	37	10	2	0	39	10
FW	(England) Brian Siddall	21	1	0	0	21	1
FW	(Northern Ireland) Sammy Smyth	14	5	0	0	14	5
MF	(England) Derrick Ward	2	0	0	0	2	0
FW	(England) Donald Whiston	6	2	2	1	8	3
–	Own goals	–	1	–	0	–	1
