= 1954–55 Stoke City F.C. season =

Stoke City
1954–55 season
- Chairman: Mr T. Duddell
- Manager: Frank Taylor
- Stadium: Victoria Ground
- Football League Second Division: 5th (52 Points)
- FA Cup: Fourth Round
- Top goalscorer: League: Harry Oscroft (21); All: Harry Oscroft (21)
- Highest home attendance: 47,000 vs Port Vale (4 September 1954)
- Lowest home attendance: 7,050 vs Fulham (26 March 1955)
- Average home league attendance: 21,131
Home colours

The 1954–55 season was Stoke City's 48th season in the Football League and the 15th in the Second Division.

Taylor continued to add new players to the squad as the aim for 1954–55 was to gain promotion back to the First Division. Stoke made a great start to the season winning five out of their first six matches. Taylor was able to field a settled team for the majority of the season alas Stoke could not keep up their form and promotion was missed with Stoke finishing in 5th position. In the FA Cup Stoke were involved in one of the longest cup ties as their third round encounter with Bury went on to a fourth replay with Stoke finally winning 3–2 after 9 hours and 22 minutes of football.

== Season review ==
=== League ===
Stoke manager Frank Taylor continued to purchase players as he attempted to guide Stoke back into the First Division. He added the Wolverhampton Wanderers left back Jack Short to his squad in the summer of 1954. Things looked to be improving when Stoke started the 1954–55 season in fine form winning five out of six. Taylor was fortunate to be able to field a settled side but the form rate was not maintained and promotion was missed, albeit by a narrow margin, Stoke taking fifth spot just two behind promoted Birmingham City and Luton Town. During the season Stoke beat Liverpool away 4–2 their first victory at Anfield for 60 years.

=== FA Cup ===
In the FA Cup Stoke were drawn with Bury in the third round and after four draws the tie went to a fourth replay with Stoke finally beating Bury 3–2 in extra time. In total the tie took 9 hours and 22 minutes of football and had an aggregated scoreline of 10–9. Unfortunately for Stoke it was all in vain as in the next round they were defeated by Swansea Town.

== Final league table ==
Pos	Team	Pld	W	D	L	GF	GA	GAv	Pts
3	Rotherham United	42	25	4	13	94	64	1.469	54
4	Leeds United	42	23	7	12	70	53	1.321	53
5	Stoke City	42	21	10	11	69	46	1.500	52
6	Blackburn Rovers	42	22	6	14	114	79	1.443	50
7	Notts County	42	21	6	15	74	71	1.042	48

Rules for classification: 1) Points; 2) Goal average; 3) Goals scored

== Results ==
Stoke's score comes first

=== Legend ===
Win	Draw	Loss

=== Football League Second Division ===
Match	Date	Opponent	Venue	Result	Attendance	Scorers
1	21 August 1954	Birmingham City	H	2–1	27,984	Oscroft, Hutton
2	25 August 1954	Nottingham Forest	A	3–0	20,515	King (3) (2 Pens)
3	28 August 1954	Middlesbrough	A	2–1	17,820	King, Oscroft
4	30 August 1954	Nottingham Forest	H	2–0	22,925	Hutton, Oscroft
5	4 September 1954	Port Vale	H	0–0	47,000	
6	8 September 1954	Leeds United	A	1–0	20,000	King
7	11 September 1954	Rotherham United	H	1–2	27,271	Oscroft
8	13 September 1954	Leeds United	H	0–1	18,737	
9	18 September 1954	Luton Town	A	1–3	17,352	Bevans
10	22 September 1954	Ipswich Town	A	1–0	15,536	Oscroft
11	25 September 1954	Hull City	H	0–0	10,185	
12	2 October 1954	Lincoln City	A	4–1	13,728	Oscroft (3), Hutton
13	9 October 1954	Notts County	A	0–1	23,000	
14	16 October 1954	Liverpool	H	2–0	23,569	Oscroft, Hutton
15	23 October 1954	West Ham United	A	0–3	27,200	
16	30 October 1954	Blackburn Rovers	H	1–1	27,540	Bowyer
17	6 November 1954	Fulham	A	2–2	32,000	Bowyer, Oscroft
18	13 November 1954	Swansea Town	H	4–1	19,993	Hutton, Malkin, Short (2)
19	27 November 1954	Derby County	H	3–1	18,055	Bowyer (2), Oscroft
20	4 December 1954	Bristol Rovers	A	1–1	21,240	McCue
21	11 December 1954	Plymouth Argyle	H	3–1	17,397	Bowyer, King (2)
22	18 December 1954	Birmingham City	A	0–2	22,100	
23	25 December 1954	Bury	H	3–2	18,312	King (3)
24	27 December 1954	Bury	A	1–1	24,091	King
25	1 January 1955	Middlesbrough	H	1–2	19,272	Harris (o.g.)
26	5 February 1955	Luton Town	H	0–0	21,156	
27	12 February 1955	Hull City	A	1–1	10,165	Oscroft
28	19 February 1955	Lincoln City	H	4–2	12,363	Bowyer (3), King
29	5 March 1955	Liverpool	A	4–2	35,635	King (2), Oscroft, Malkin
30	12 March 1955	West Ham United	H	0–2	20,496	
31	19 March 1955	Blackburn Rovers	A	0–2	27,200	
32	26 March 1955	Fulham	H	1–1	7,050	Oscroft
33	28 March 1955	Notts County	H	3–0	8,171	Oscroft (2), Finney
34	2 April 1955	Swansea Town	A	5–3	12,534	Oscroft (2), Finney, Bowyer, King
35	9 April 1955	Doncaster Rovers	H	3–0	20,259	Oscroft, Bowyer, King
36	11 April 1955	Ipswich Town	H	3–0	20,551	Oscroft, Bowyer, Malkin
37	16 April 1955	Derby County	A	2–1	12,584	Finney, King
38	18 April 1955	Rotherham United	A	1–2	19,888	Bowyer
39	20 April 1955	Doncaster Rovers	A	1–1	9,857	Malkin
40	23 April 1955	Bristol Rovers	H	2–0	18,139	Oscroft, Finney
41	25 April 1955	Port Vale	A	1–0	40,066	Bowyer
42	30 April 1955	Plymouth Argyle	A	0–2	23,844	

=== FA Cup ===
Round	Date	Opponent	Venue	Result	Attendance	Scorers
R3	8 January 1955	Bury	A	1–1	20,227	King
R3 Replay	12 January 1955	Bury	H	1–1 (aet)	13,352	Ratcliffe
R3 Second Replay	17 January 1955	Bury	N	3–3 (aet)	2,469	Bowyer (2), King
R3 Third Replay	19 January 1955	Bury	N	2–2 (aet)	9,881	Ratcliffe, King
R3 Fourth Replay	24 January 1955	Bury	N	3–2 (aet)	22,549	Thomson, Coleman (2)
R4	28 January 1955	Swansea Town	A	1–3	27,892	Malkin

== Squad statistics ==
Pos.	Name	League		FA Cup		Total	
Pos.	Name	Apps	Goals	Apps	Goals	Apps	Goals
GK	(England) Wilf Hall	1	0	5	0	6	0
GK	(England) Bill Robertson	41	0	1	0	42	0
DF	(England) George Bourne	28	0	6	0	34	0
DF	(England) John McCue	41	1	0	0	41	1
DF	(England) Jack Short	25	2	6	0	31	2
DF	(Scotland) Ken Thomson	41	0	6	1	47	1
MF	(Scotland) Bobby Cairns	18	0	6	0	24	0
MF	(England) Frank Mountford	40	0	3	0	43	0
MF	(England) Alan Martin	3	0	3	0	6	0
MF	(England) John Sellars	38	0	0	0	38	0
FW	(England) Stan Bevans	11	1	0	0	11	1
FW	(England) Frank Bowyer	29	13	6	2	35	15
FW	(England) Neville Coleman	2	0	2	2	4	2
FW	(England) Bill Finney	11	4	4	0	15	4
FW	(England) Colin Hutchinson	6	0	0	0	6	0
FW	(Scotland) Joe Hutton	19	5	0	0	19	5
FW	(England) Johnny King	36	17	6	3	42	20
FW	(England) John Malkin	26	4	5	1	31	5
FW	(England) Harry Oscroft	37	21	1	0	38	21
FW	(England) Don Ratcliffe	6	0	5	2	11	2
FW	(England) Derrick Ward	3	0	1	0	4	0
–	Own goals	–	1	–	0	–	1
