= Steve Fleet =

English footballer and manager (1937–2025)

Personal information
- Full name: Stephen Fleet
- Date of birth: 2 July 1937
- Place of birth: Urmston, Lancashire, England
- Date of death: 1 March 2025 (aged 87)
- Position: Goalkeeper

Youth career
- –1953: Bolton Wanderers
- 1953–1957: Manchester City

Senior career*
Years	Team	Apps	(Gls)
1957–1961	Manchester City	5	(0)
1963–1966	Wrexham	79	(0)
1966–1968	Stockport County	36	(0)
1968–?	Altrincham		

Managerial career
- 1981: ÍA Akranes
- 1982–1983: ÍBV
- * Club domestic league appearances and goals

Stephen Fleet (2 July 1937 – 1 March 2025) was an English football player and manager.

== Biography ==
Fleet played for Manchester City, Wrexham, Stockport County and Altrincham.

He also managed ÍA Akranes and ÍBV. Fleet died in March 2025, at the age of 87.
