= Raymond T. Evans =

American politician

Delaware House of Representatives
- In office 1966–1968

Personal details
- Born: August 13, 1933
- Died: May 19, 1984 (aged 50)
- Party: Republican

Raymond T. Evans (August 13, 1933 – May 19, 1984) was a state legislator in Delaware. He served in the Delaware House of Representatives as a Republican from 1966 until 1968.

== Biography ==
Evans was born August 13, 1933, and graduated from the Howard High School in Wilmington, Delaware, in 1952.

Evans first tried unsuccessfully for election to the house in 1964, then successfully in 1966 by defeating incumbent Harry S. Wilson. He represented the 2nd district, Wilmington, Delaware, in the Delaware House of Representatives from 1966 until 1968. During his service he was the chairman of the Health and Welfare Committee.

He went to Washington in July 1967 to have closed-door meetings with senators J. Caleb Boggs and John Williams and representative William Roth to discuss the misapplied federal efforts on urban problems.

Evans declared that he would fast from April 23, 1968, until the Assembly took action on the problems facing the black community. He fasted for ten days on just liquids.

Evans was the only black delegate at the Republican National Convention in 1968 and staged a revolt over the nomination of Richard Nixon over Nelson Rockefeller. He refused to change his vote and left the convention with the remaining delegates then recording all twelve votes for Nixon in his absence.

He owned a liquor store which in July 1968 was shot at from a passing car and a bar he owned had been fire-bombed the previous week. Evans was not sure if the target was him or the businesses.

He sought re-election in 1968 ignoring calls to run for a seat on the County Council or the presidency of the City Council instead. He was running for the new 3rd district created that year. He was defeated by democrat Oliver S. Fonville and went on to be appointed as a special assistant to Hal Haskell. He served in this position until 1972 liaising between the mayors office and the black community. He had been known for patrolling the streets in his car in the early hours to stop anger and tempers escalating while also seeking solutions to the underlying problems.

Evans was the president of the board of trustees for a foundation that oversaw the setting up of the black cultural center in the Martin Luther King Center in Market Street, Wilmington.

He died May 19, 1984, aged 50, and was survived by his wife and three children.
