= 1953–54 Stoke City F.C. season =

Stoke City
1953–54 season
- Chairman: Mr T. Duddell
- Manager: Frank Taylor
- Stadium: Victoria Ground
- Football League Second Division: 11th (41 Points)
- FA Cup: Fourth Round
- Top goalscorer: League: Frank Bowyer (14); All: Frank Bowyer (18)
- Highest home attendance: 26,790 vs Leeds United (16 January 1953)
- Lowest home attendance: 5,804 vs Plymouth Argyle (26 April 1954)
- Average home league attendance: 18,009
Home colours

The 1953–54 season was Stoke City's 47th season in the Football League and the 14th in the Second Division.

During the summer of 1953, Taylor began moving on a number of former favourites as he began at stamp his mark on the club; however, with not much money to spend the squad had a decidedly mid-table look. And so it turned out to be as Stoke were very average and with seventeen draws they finished in eleventh position as Taylor struggled to find his most successful team.

== Season review ==
=== League ===
With Stoke now in the Second Division manager Frank Taylor decided to clear out some of the long serving players. Dennis Herod and Leslie Johnston both joined Shrewsbury Town and Jock Kirton left for Bradford City. Taylor and a relatively new board, saw no quick way back into the First Division and there would be no panic buying. Taylor insisted that he would buy if necessary but would be looking to bring players through the youth and reserve ranks at the club.

There was then, a distinct mid-table look about the Stoke City squad as the 1953–54 season got underway and Taylor like so many other managers heard of the impressive young duo at nearby Crewe Alexandra that of Johnny King and Frank Blunstone. In September he made his move for the pair and signed King for £8,000 but could not afford Blunstone who went on to Chelsea. He also signed Scottish pair Bobby Cairns and Joe Hutton to boost his midfield. However, it was very dull season for the supporters as there was seventeen draws during the season with 1–1 being the most popular scoreline. The season's average attendance fell to 18,000, 10,000 down on the previous season. Stoke did however manage to record their highest league away win beating Bury 6–0 on 13 March 1954 at Gigg Lane. However, there was great sadness at the end of the season as in May 1954 former long serving defender and manager Bob McGrory died at the age of 62 just two years after he ended his 31-year association with the club.

=== FA Cup ===
After soundly beating Hartlepool United 6–2 in the third round with Frank Bowyer scoring four Stoke lost to Leicester City after a replay.

== Final league table ==
Pos	Team	Pld	W	D	L	GF	GA	GAv	Pts
9	Bristol Rovers	42	14	16	12	64	58	1.103	44
10	Leeds United	42	15	13	14	89	81	1.099	43
11	Stoke City	42	12	17	13	71	60	1.183	41
12	Doncaster Rovers	42	16	9	17	59	63	0.937	41
13	West Ham United	42	15	9	18	67	69	0.971	39

Rules for classification: 1) Points; 2) Goal average; 3) Goals scored

== Results ==
Stoke's score comes first

=== Legend ===
Win	Draw	Loss

=== Football League Second Division ===
Match	Date	Opponent	Venue	Result	Attendance	Scorers
1	19 August 1953	Brentford	H	1–1	22,403	Oscroft
2	22 August 1953	Fulham	A	1–0	28,000	Finney
3	24 August 1953	Derby County	H	2–2	23,689	Finney (2)
4	29 August 1953	West Ham United	H	1–1	20,744	Connor
5	2 September 1953	Derby County	A	1–1	18,222	Finney
6	5 September 1953	Leeds United	A	1–1	27,000	Oscroft
7	7 September 1953	Leicester City	A	0–4	25,000	
8	12 September 1953	Birmingham City	H	3–2	22,853	Oscroft, Bowyer, Mountford (pen)
9	14 September 1953	Leicester City	H	2–2	19,367	Malkin (2)
10	19 September 1953	Nottingham Forest	A	4–5	22,690	Malkin (2), Bowyer, Sellars
11	21 September 1953	Rotherham United	A	2–2	13,161	Malkin, Finney
12	26 September 1953	Luton Town	H	1–1	24,082	King
13	3 October 1953	Plymouth Argyle	A	1–1	16,000	Oscroft
14	10 October 1953	Blackburn Rovers	H	3–0	23,329	Bowyer, Thomson (2)
15	17 October 1953	Doncaster Rovers	A	0–1	10,000	
16	24 October 1953	Bury	H	4–0	19,250	Bowyer, Malkin, Siddall, Oscroft
17	31 October 1953	Oldham Athletic	A	0–1	15,703	
18	7 November 1953	Everton	H	2–4	18,696	Bowyer, Bourne
19	14 November 1953	Hull City	A	2–1	26,581	Bowyer, Siddall
20	21 November 1953	Notts County	H	0–1	17,396	
21	28 November 1953	Lincoln City	A	1–1	14,674	Siddall
22	5 December 1953	Bristol Rovers	H	3–2	13,178	Siddall (2), Malkin
23	12 December 1953	Brentford	A	0–0	12,338	
24	19 December 1953	Fulham	H	1–3	13,884	King
25	26 December 1953	Swansea Town	A	2–2	18,239	Oscroft, Finney
26	28 December 1953	Swansea Town	H	5–0	17,785	King (3), Bowyer, Hutton
27	16 January 1954	Leeds United	H	4–0	26,790	Hutton, Oscroft (2), Malkin
28	23 January 1954	Birmingham City	A	0–1	25,199	
29	6 February 1954	Nottingham Forest	H	1–1	17,345	Bowyer
30	13 February 1954	Luton Town	A	1–0	15,000	Malkin
31	27 February 1954	Blackburn Rovers	A	0–3	27,100	
32	6 March 1954	Doncaster Rovers	H	2–2	13,061	Bowyer, King
33	13 March 1954	Bury	A	6–0	13,763	Bowyer (2), King, Oscroft (2), Hart (o.g.)
34	20 March 1954	Oldham Athletic	H	0–1	14,632	
35	27 March 1954	Notts County	A	1–2	15,632	King
36	3 April 1954	Lincoln City	H	4–1	11,371	King (2), Malkin, Bowyer
37	10 April 1954	Everton	A	1–1	46,411	Oscroft
38	12 April 1954	West Ham United	A	2–2	10,523	Coleman (2)
39	17 April 1954	Hull City	H	0–1	17,371	
40	19 April 1954	Rotherham United	H	1–1	13,974	Oscroft
41	24 April 1954	Bristol Rovers	A	2–3	22,687	Oscroft, Bowyer
42	26 April 1954	Plymouth Argyle	H	3–2	5,804	Bowyer, King, Coleman

=== FA Cup ===
Round	Date	Opponent	Venue	Result	Attendance	Scorers
R3	9 January 1954	Hartlepool United	H	6–2	23,927	Bowyer (4), King, Hutton
R4	30 January 1954	Leicester City	H	0–0	39,066	
R4 Replay	2 February 1954	Leicester City	A	1–3	20,000	Malkin

== Squad statistics ==
Pos.	Name	League		FA Cup		Total	
Pos.	Name	Apps	Goals	Apps	Goals	Apps	Goals
GK	(Wales) Frank Elliott	10	0	0	0	10	0
GK	(Wales) Peter Isaac	0	0	0	0	0	0
GK	(England) Bill Robertson	32	0	3	0	35	0
DF	(England) Roy Beckett	4	0	0	0	4	0
DF	(England) George Bourne	42	1	3	0	45	1
DF	(England) John Cotton	2	0	0	0	2	0
DF	(England) John McCue	36	0	3	0	39	0
DF	(Scotland) Ken Thomson	40	2	3	0	43	2
MF	(England) Bill Asprey	1	0	0	0	1	0
MF	(Scotland) Bobby Cairns	5	0	0	0	5	0
MF	(England) Des Farrow	5	0	0	0	5	0
MF	(England) Frank Mountford	41	1	3	0	44	1
MF	(England) John Sellars	15	1	0	0	15	1
FW	(England) Frank Bowyer	41	14	3	4	44	18
FW	(England) Neville Coleman	5	3	0	0	5	3
FW	(England) Harold Connor	2	1	0	0	2	1
FW	(England) Bill Finney	25	6	0	0	25	6
FW	(Scotland) Joe Hutton	7	2	3	1	10	3
FW	(England) Johnny King	24	11	3	1	27	12
FW	(England) John Malkin	39	10	3	1	42	11
FW	(England) Alan Martin	38	0	3	0	41	0
FW	(England) Harry Oscroft	33	13	3	0	36	13
FW	(England) Brian Siddall	10	5	0	0	10	5
FW	(England) Ron Smith	0	0	0	0	0	0
FW	(England) Arthur Woodall	1	0	0	0	1	0
FW	(England) Donald Whiston	4	0	0	0	4	0
–	Own goals	–	1	–	0	–	1
