= Jimmy McIlroy =

Northern Irish footballer

Personal information
- Full name: James McIlroy
- Date of birth: 25 October 1931
- Place of birth: Lambeg, Northern Ireland
- Date of death: 20 August 2018 (aged 86)
- Positions: Forward; attacking midfielder

Senior career*
Years	Team	Apps	(Gls)
1949–1950	Glentoran	18	(8)
1950–1963	Burnley	439	(116)
1963–1965	Stoke City	98	(16)
1965–1967	Oldham Athletic	39	(1)
Total		576	(141)

International career
1951–1965	Northern Ireland	55	(10)

Managerial career
- 1966–1968: Oldham Athletic
- 1970: Bolton Wanderers
- * Club domestic league appearances and goals

James McIlroy MBE (25 October 1931 – 20 August 2018) was a Northern Ireland international footballer, who played for Glentoran, Burnley, Stoke City and Oldham Athletic. He was regarded as one of Burnley's greatest players, having played 497 matches and scoring 131 goals. McIlroy also managed Oldham Athletic and Bolton Wanderers.

== Career ==
=== Burnley ===
McIlroy was born in Lambeg, County Antrim, and he was introduced to football at an early age as his father, Harry played for Lisburn Distillery and his uncle, Willie played for Portadown. After leaving school McIlroy played for Glentoran before joining Burnley in March 1950 for £7,000. He soon cemented his reputation as one of the finest scheming inside forwards since World War II. He was dubbed as the 'Brain' of Burnley and was a very composed passer of the ball only releasing it when he was sure of finding a teammate. His neat footwork made him a crowd favourite at Turf Moor and indeed for the Northern Ireland national team where he made 55 caps. He helped Burnley win the First Division in 1959–60 and reach the FA Cup Final in 1962, losing 3–1 to Tottenham Hotspur. After 497 matches for the "Clarets" scoring 131 goals, McIlroy was allowed to leave for Stoke City for a cut price £25,000, which came as a shock to the Burnley fans who branded chairman Bob Lord 'insane'.

On 4 February 1962 the first issue of The Sunday Times Magazine titled "A sharp glance at the mood of Britain" featured one frame of McElroy in a John Bulmer action pic within a full-bleed 11-frame grid of David Bailey photographs of Jean Shrimpton wearing a Mary Quant outfit.

=== Stoke City ===
McIlroy joined Tony Waddington's Stoke who at the time had a collection of experienced veterans with the likes of Stanley Matthews, Dennis Viollet, Jackie Mudie and Don Ratcliffe. He arrived at Stoke with the side top of the table but his debut for Stoke was a disaster as Stoke crashed to a 6–0 defeat at Norwich City. Regardless Stoke continued their push for promotion and with McIlroy's intelligent passing featuring heavily they claimed the Second Division title in 1962–63. He scored 12 goals in 1963–64 as Stoke established themselves in the top tier, he also played in the 1964 League Cup Final as Stoke lost 4–3 Leicester City. His final match for the "Potters" was against Burnley on 27 December 1965 leaving to become manager of Oldham Athletic.

== Later career ==
In January 1966 he moved into management after being recruited by new Oldham Athletic chairman Ken Bates. With Oldham struggling at the foot of the Third Division, Oldham paid Stoke £5,000 so that they could register McIlroy as a player again. He signed several former Stoke City team-mates, including Bill Asprey, Alan Philpott, George Kinnell and Keith Bebbington. However McIlroy did not cope well with the pressure of management and resigned after losing 4–0 against Luton Town on the opening day of the 1968–69 season. He returned to Stoke City for a short while as assistant to Waddington before moving to Bolton Wanderers as coach and assistant to Nat Lofthouse. McIlroy had an 18-day spell in charge after Lofthouse's departure but resigned after just two matches on principle after being told by the board to sell players.

== After football ==
He retired to the Burnley area and was a regular attender of Burnley home matches. He was given Freedom of the Borough Burnley in December 2008 and was given a testimonial match by Burnley in 2009.

McIlroy was appointed Member of the Order of the British Empire (MBE) in the 2011 New Years Honours List for services to football and to charity, and arranged to receive the honour at Burnley's Turf Moor ground rather than at Buckingham Palace.

In April 2015, the feature-length documentary Spirit of '58 was screened as part of the Belfast Film Festival. It featured Jimmy McIlroy prominently alongside the other surviving players (Billy Bingham, Peter McParland, Billy Simpson and Harry Gregg) as it told the story of Northern Ireland's journey throughout the 1950s under the managership of Peter Doherty, culminating in the 1958 World Cup.

McIlroy died on 20 August 2018 at the age of 86. In a statement Burnley called him "our greatest ever player."

== Jimmy McIlroy Stand ==
Burnley's stadium, Turf Moor, has a stand named in McIlroy's honour. The stadium's eastern stand was rebuilt in the late 1990s after the Beehole End was demolished and was named the "Jimmy McIlroy Stand".

== Career statistics ==
=== Playing career ===
Appearances and goals by club, season and competition
Club	Season	Division	League		FA Cup		League Cup		Other^{[A]}		Total	
Club	Season	Division	Apps	Goals	Apps	Goals	Apps	Goals	Apps	Goals	Apps	Goals
Burnley	1950–51	First Division	30	5	1	0	–		0	0	31	5
Burnley	1951–52	First Division	28	4	0	0	–		0	0	28	4
Burnley	1952–53	First Division	38	11	3	1	–		0	0	41	12
Burnley	1953–54	First Division	40	17	3	1	–		0	0	43	18
Burnley	1954–55	First Division	40	3	1	0	–		0	0	41	3
Burnley	1955–56	First Division	24	4	5	1	–		0	0	29	5
Burnley	1956–57	First Division	40	13	5	3	–		0	0	45	16
Burnley	1957–58	First Division	36	16	3	3	–		0	0	39	19
Burnley	1958–59	First Division	40	6	5	1	–		0	0	45	7
Burnley	1959–60	First Division	32	6	6	1	–		0	0	38	7
Burnley	1960–61	First Division	33	10	7	1	3	1	5	1	48	13
Burnley	1961–62	First Division	36	15	8	1	0	0	0	0	44	16
Burnley	1962–63	First Division	22	6	3	0	0	0	0	0	25	6
Burnley	Total		439	116	50	13	3	1	5	1	497	131
Stoke City	1962–63	Second Division	18	6	0	0	0	0	0	0	18	6
Stoke City	1963–64	First Division	32	9	4	3	7	0	0	0	43	12
Stoke City	1964–65	First Division	31	1	3	0	2	0	0	0	36	1
Stoke City	1965–66	First Division	17	0	0	0	2	0	0	0	19	0
Stoke City	Total		98	16	7	3	11	0	0	0	116	19
Oldham Athletic	1965–66	Third Division	12	0	0	0	0	0	0	0	12	0
Oldham Athletic	1966–67	Third Division	25	1	1	0	1	0	0	0	27	1
Oldham Athletic	1967–68	Third Division	2	0	0	0	1	0	0	0	3	0
Oldham Athletic	Total		39	1	1	0	2	0	0	0	42	1
Career Total			576	133	58	16	16	1	5	1	655	151

A. The "Other" column constitutes appearances and goals in the European Cup and FA Charity Shield.

=== Managerial career ===
Team	From	To	Record				
Team	From	To	G	W	D	L	Win %
Oldham Athletic	1 January 1966	1 August 1968	122	46	26	50	37.70
Bolton Wanderers	1 November 1970	19 November 1970	2	0	0	2	0.00
Total			124	46	26	52	37.10

=== International ===
National team	Year	Apps	Goals
Northern Ireland	1951	2	0
Northern Ireland	1952	3	0
Northern Ireland	1953	3	0
Northern Ireland	1954	3	0
Northern Ireland	1955	3	0
Northern Ireland	1956	3	1
Northern Ireland	1957	7	2
Northern Ireland	1958	10	3
Northern Ireland	1959	3	1
Northern Ireland	1960	3	0
Northern Ireland	1961	6	3
Northern Ireland	1962	5	0
Northern Ireland	1963	1	0
Northern Ireland	1964	3	0
Total		55	10

=== International goals ===
Scores and results list Northern Ireland's goal tally first.

#	Date	Venue	Opponent	Result	Competition
1	6 October 1956	Belfast, Northern Ireland	England	1–1	1957 British Home Championship
2	1 May 1957	Belfast, Northern Ireland	Portugal	3–0	1958 FIFA World Cup qualification
3	6 November 1957	London, UK	England	3–2	1958 British Home Championship
4	15 January 1958	Belfast, Northern Ireland	Italy	2–1	1958 FIFA World Cup qualification
5	15 October 1958	Madrid, Spain	Spain	2–6	Friendly match
6	5 November 1958	Glasgow, Scotland	Scotland	2–2	1959 British Home Championship
7	22 April 1959	Wrexham, Wales	Wales	4–1	1959 British Home Championship
8	3 May 1961	Athens, Greece	Greece	1–2	1962 FIFA World Cup qualification
9	10 May 1961	West Berlin, Germany	West Germany	1–2	1962 FIFA World Cup qualification
10	22 November 1961	London, UK	England	1–1	1962 British Home Championship

== Honours ==
Burnley

- Football League First Division: 1959–60
- FA Cup runner-up: 1961–62

Stoke City

- Football League Second Division: 1962–63
- Football League Cup runner-up: 1963–64
