= 1960–61 Stoke City F.C. season =

Stoke City
1960–61 season
- Chairman: Albert Henshall
- Manager: Tony Waddington
- Stadium: Victoria Ground
- Football League Second Division: 18th (36 Points)
- FA Cup: Fifth Round
- League Cup: First Round
- Top goalscorer: League: Johnny King (12); All: Johnny King (13)
- Highest home attendance: 14,690 vs Sunderland (22 August 1960)
- Lowest home attendance: 4,463 vs Liverpool (3 May 1961)
- Average home league attendance: 9,252
Home colours

The 1960–61 season was Stoke City's 54th season in the Football League and the 21st in the Second Division.

With the unsuccessful Frank Taylor now departed his assistant Tony Waddington was appointed as the clubs new manager. It was a transitional season for Stoke but there was probably too much upheaval as performances out on the pitch were not good and despite a 9–0 win over Plymouth Argyle, Stoke finished in 18th place avoiding relegation by three points.

== Season review ==
=== League ===
A clear-out of players was under way in the summer of 1960 with two goalkeepers Bill Robertson and Wilf Hall both departing. Also leaving the Victoria Ground was long serving defender John McCue and a number of fringe players. To replace the hole left by the departure of the 'keepers Tony Waddington made his first signing, Irish international Jimmy O'Neill from Everton for £5,000.

There was no instant improvements as Stoke searched for a sustained run of success. An attack that could not score regularly was a major problem and it was so bad that by Christmas time centre-back Bill Asprey was moved up front and he impressed scoring twice in a 9–0 win over Plymouth Argyle and he also scored a hat-trick against Charlton Athletic. That win over Plymouth is Stoke second highest league victory. Ahead of the March transfer deadline, Waddington paid £7,000 to Blackpool for their winger Jackie Mudie whose vast experience brought guile to the attack. Mudie effectively replaced Dennis Wilshaw who broke his leg in the FA Cup at Newcastle and had to retire.

Stoke took 18th place in the Second Division at the end of Waddington's first season in charge their away form letting them down badly with just three wins recorded and 12 goals scored and for the first time since the 1907–08 season the average home attendance was under 10,000.

=== FA Cup ===
In the FA Cup Stoke made it to the fifth round before losing to Newcastle United after beating West Ham United and a tricky three matches against Aldershot.

=== League Cup ===
The 1960–61 season was also the start of a new cup competition the Football League Cup, Stoke made an embarrassing start losing 3–1 to Fourth Division Doncaster Rovers. Doncaster defender Tommy Hymers scored an own goal giving him the dubious honour of being Stoke's first League Cup goalscorer.

== Final league table ==
Pos	Team	Pld	W	D	L	GF	GA	GAv	Pts
16	Brighton & Hove Albion	42	14	9	19	61	75	0.813	37
17	Bristol Rovers	42	15	7	20	73	92	0.793	37
18	Stoke City	42	12	12	18	51	59	0.864	36
19	Leyton Orient	42	14	8	20	55	78	0.705	36
20	Huddersfield Town	42	13	9	20	62	71	0.873	35

Rules for classification: 1) Points; 2) Goal average; 3) Goals scored

== Results ==
Stoke's score comes first

=== Legend ===
Win	Draw	Loss

=== Football League Second Division ===
Match	Date	Opponent	Venue	Result	Attendance	Scorers
1	20 August 1960	Plymouth Argyle	A	1–3	21,138	Bullock
2	22 August 1960	Sunderland	H	0–0	14,690	
3	27 August 1960	Norwich City	H	1–1	11,716	Wilshaw
4	31 August 1960	Sunderland	A	0–4	19,007	
5	3 September 1960	Charlton Athletic	A	1–3	8,147	Ratcliffe
6	7 September 1960	Portsmouth	A	0–1	16,497	
7	10 September 1960	Sheffield United	H	2–0	11,328	Wilshaw (2)
8	12 September 1960	Portsmouth	H	1–0	11,686	King
9	17 September 1960	Derby County	A	1–1	14,432	Asprey
10	24 September 1960	Swansea Town	A	0–0	9,520	
11	1 October 1960	Luton Town	H	3–0	9,395	Wilshaw (2), Bentley
12	8 October 1960	Leyton Orient	H	1–2	9,149	Wilshaw
13	15 October 1960	Scunthorpe United	A	1–1	8,777	Bentley
14	22 October 1960	Ipswich Town	H	2–4	8,056	Bentley, D Ward
15	29 October 1960	Brighton & Hove Albion	A	1–0	8,791	Wilshaw
16	5 November 1960	Middlesbrough	H	1–1	9,019	D Ward
17	12 November 1960	Leeds United	A	1–0	13,535	King
18	19 November 1960	Southampton	H	1–2	10,465	King
19	26 November 1960	Rotherham United	A	0–0	8,330	
20	10 December 1960	Bristol Rovers	A	0–1	13,407	
21	17 December 1960	Plymouth Argyle	H	9–0	6,479	Asprey (2), King (3), Wilshaw, Ratcliffe (2), Fincham (o.g.)
22	24 December 1960	Huddersfield Town	H	2–2	10,029	Wilshaw (2)
23	26 December 1960	Huddersfield Town	A	0–0	13,783	
24	31 December 1960	Norwich City	A	0–1	20,681	
25	16 January 1961	Charlton Athletic	H	5–3	10,988	Asprey (3), Bentley, Wilshaw
26	21 January 1961	Sheffield United	A	1–4	13,865	King
27	11 February 1961	Swansea Town	H	1–3	10,517	Davies (o.g.)
28	23 February 1961	Luton Town	A	1–4	12,142	Bullock
29	4 March 1961	Scunthorpe United	H	2–0	12,567	King, Mudie
30	11 March 1961	Ipswich Town	A	1–2	16,578	King
31	18 March 1961	Bristol Rovers	H	2–0	7,826	Ratcliffe, Bullock (pen)
32	20 March 1961	Derby County	H	2–1	6,831	Mudie, Bullock (pen)
33	25 March 1961	Middlesbrough	A	0–1	8,534	
34	31 March 1961	Lincoln City	A	1–1	6,651	Bullock
35	1 April 1961	Rotherham United	H	1–4	8,241	King
36	3 April 1961	Lincoln City	H	0–0	6,383	
37	8 April 1961	Southampton	A	1–0	12,927	Mudie
38	10 April 1961	Leyton Orient	A	1–3	8,349	King
39	15 April 1961	Leeds United	H	0–0	7,130	
40	22 April 1961	Liverpool	A	0–3	13,389	
41	29 April 1961	Brighton & Hove Albion	H	0–2	5,232	
42	3 May 1961	Liverpool	H	3–1	4,463	King, Bentley (2)

=== FA Cup ===
Round	Date	Opponent	Venue	Result	Attendance	Scorers
R3	7 January 1961	West Ham United	A	2–2	21,545	Ratcliffe, Andrew
R3 Replay	11 January 1961	West Ham United	H	1–0	28,914	Wilshaw
R4	28 January 1961	Aldershot	H	0–0	18,289	
R4 Replay	1 February 1961	Aldershot	A	0–0 (aet)	16,489	
R4 2nd Replay	6 February 1961	Aldershot	N	3–0	16,672	Wilshaw (2), Asprey
R5	16 February 1961	Newcastle United	A	1–3	46,170	King 81'

=== League Cup ===
Round	Date	Opponent	Venue	Result	Attendance	Scorers
R2	18 October 1960	Doncaster Rovers	A	1–3	5,694	Hymers (o.g.)

== Squad statistics ==
Pos.	Name	League		FA Cup		League Cup		Total	
Pos.	Name	Apps	Goals	Apps	Goals	Apps	Goals	Apps	Goals
GK	(England) Geoff Hickson	1	0	0	0	0	0	1	0
GK	(Republic of Ireland) Jimmy O'Neill	41	0	6	0	1	0	48	0
DF	(England) Tony Allen	42	0	6	0	1	0	49	0
DF	(England) Ron Andrew	37	0	6	1	1	0	44	1
DF	(England) Eric Skeels	37	0	6	0	1	0	44	0
DF	(England) Terry Ward	27	0	1	0	1	0	29	0
DF	(England) Denis Wilson	5	0	4	0	0	0	9	0
DF	(Scotland) Ron Wilson	1	0	0	0	0	0	1	0
MF	(England) Bill Asprey	35	6	4	1	1	0	40	7
MF	(England) Gerry Bridgwood	1	0	0	0	0	0	1	0
MF	(Scotland) Bobby Cairns	6	0	0	0	0	0	6	0
MF	(England) Bobby Griffiths	0	0	0	0	0	0	0	0
MF	(Scotland) Bobby Howitt	35	0	6	0	1	0	42	0
MF	(England) Alan Philpott	1	0	0	0	0	0	1	0
MF	(England) Ray White	0	0	0	0	0	0	0	0
FW	(Australia) John Anderson	10	0	0	0	0	0	10	0
FW	(England) Tony Bentley	28	6	6	0	1	0	35	6
FW	(England) Peter Bullock	17	5	0	0	0	0	17	5
FW	(England) Johnny King	41	12	6	1	1	0	48	13
FW	(England) Graham Matthews	2	0	0	0	0	0	2	0
FW	(Scotland) Jackie Mudie	13	3	0	0	0	0	13	3
FW	(England) Don Ratcliffe	41	4	6	1	1	0	48	5
FW	(England) Derrick Ward	17	2	3	0	1	0	21	2
FW	(England) Dennis Wilshaw	24	11	6	3	0	0	30	14
–	Own goals	–	2	–	0	–	1	–	3
