= Nibloe =

Nibloe is a surname. Notable people with the surname include:

- Hugh Nibloe (born 1982), Scottish wheelchair curler
- Jack Nibloe (1939–1964), English footballer
- Joe Nibloe (1903–1976), Scottish footballer
