= Jack Hindle =

Jack Hindle is the name of:

- Jack Hindle (footballer, born 1921), English footballer for Barrow
- Jack Hindle (footballer, born 1993), English footballer for Barrow
