= Ray White (disambiguation) =

Ray White is an African American soul vocalist and rock and blues guitarist.

Ray White may also refer to:

== Sportspeople ==
- Ray White (American football) (1949–2025), American football player
- Ray White (baseball) (1910–1995), American baseball pitcher and manager
- Ray White (boxer) (born 1938), American light heavyweight boxer
- Ray White (cricketer) (born 1941), South African cricketer
- Ray White (footballer, born 1918) (1918–1988), English footballer
- Ray White (footballer, born 1941), English footballer

== Others ==
- D. Ray White (1927–1985), American mountain dancer and entertainer
- Ray Bridwell White (1892–1946), member of the Pillar of Fire Church in Zarephath, New Jersey, United States
- Ray White (politician), Canadian politician in Nova Scotia

== See also ==
- Raymond White (disambiguation)
