= Finchum =

Finchum is a surname. Notable people with the surname include:

- Chad Finchum (born 1994), American professional stock car racing driver
- Thomas Finchum (born 1989), American country musician and platform diver

== See also ==
- Fincham (surname)
- Finchem
