= Finchem =

Finchem is a surname. Notable people with the surname include:

- Mark Finchem (born 1957), American politician
- Tim Finchem (born 1947), American lawyer and retired golf administrator

== See also ==
- Fincham (surname)
- Finchum
