= 1961–62 Stoke City F.C. season =

Stoke City
1961–62 season
- Chairman: Albert Henshall
- Manager: Tony Waddington
- Stadium: Victoria Ground
- Football League Second Division: 8th (42 Points)
- FA Cup: Fourth Round
- League Cup: Second Round
- Top goalscorer: League: Tommy Thompson (16); All: Tommy Thompson (17)
- Highest home attendance: 35,974 vs Huddersfield Town (28 October 1961)
- Lowest home attendance: 7,506 vs Luton Town (7 April 1962)
- Average home league attendance: 15,751
Home colours

The 1961–62 season was Stoke City's 55th season in the Football League and the 22nd in the Second Division.

Attendances were now at a worrying all-time low and so the Stoke board and manager Tony Waddington decided something needed to be done to bring the supporters back to the Victoria Ground. And Waddington pulled off a master stroke after paying £3,000 to Blackpool for the returning 46-year-old Stanley Matthews. Crowds instantly arrived in large numbers with Matthews first match back against Huddersfield Town more than 35,000 turned up a good 15,000 more than the last home match. Stoke could not sustain a push for promotion, but the feeling around the club had changed dramatically.

== Season review ==
=== League ===
Attendances remained stubbornly poor as the 1961–62 season commenced, Stoke losing 2–1 at home to Rotherham United in front of 11,000 fans. The club's finances were seriously in question with the worrying decline in support. To regress the slide Stoke brought back Stanley Matthews at the age of 46 some 14 years after he left for Blackpool. It certainly had the desired effect as the crowds quickly returned and traffic jams stretched for miles on the day he made his second debut for Stoke City at the Victoria Ground against Huddersfield Town when 35,974 fans assembled to welcome back their hero and see him inspire Stoke to a 3–0 win, the attendance in Stoke's previous home match was just 8,409.

The resurgence was on as Stoke slowly but surely picked up some good results and climbed the table as they went on a seven match unbeaten run in December. Dennis Viollet a fine centre forward joined from Manchester United for a fee of £22,000. By March Stoke's form fell away and they ended the season in eighth spot but the feeling was that Stoke had renewed confidence for the future.

=== FA Cup ===
Stoke were drawn away at last season's winners Leicester City in the FA Cup. The match ended in a 1–1 draw but in the replay Stoke knocked out the "Foxes" 5–2 to set up a fourth round meeting with Blackburn Rovers. A crowd of 49,486 saw Rovers win 1–0 thanks to a controversial penalty, the referees decision enraged one Stoke supporter so much he started legal action against him.

=== League Cup ===
Stoke recorded their first victory in the League Cup at Roots Hall beating Southend United 1–0. In the next round they were easily beaten 4–1 at Charlton Athletic.

== Final league table ==
Pos	Team	Pld	W	D	L	GF	GA	GAv	Pts
6	Southampton	42	18	9	15	77	62	1.242	45
7	Huddersfield Town	42	16	12	14	67	59	1.136	44
8	Stoke City	42	17	8	17	55	57	0.965	42
9	Rotherham United	42	16	9	17	70	76	0.921	41
10	Preston North End	42	15	10	17	55	57	0.965	40

Rules for classification: 1) Points; 2) Goal average; 3) Goals scored

== Results ==
Stoke's score comes first

=== Legend ===
Win	Draw	Loss

=== Football League Second Division ===
Match	Date	Opponent	Venue	Result	Attendance	Scorers
1	19 August 1961	Rotherham United	H	1–2	11,071	Thompson (pen)
2	22 August 1961	Charlton Athletic	A	2–2	7,861	G Matthews, Mudie
3	26 August 1961	Sunderland	A	1–2	34,183	Adam
4	28 August 1961	Charlton Athletic	H	4–0	11,005	G Matthews, Thompson (2), Bullock
5	2 September 1961	Derby County	H	1–1	13,834	Mudie
6	5 September 1961	Brighton & Hove Albion	A	1–2	12,515	Skeels
7	9 September 1961	Bristol Rovers	H	2–1	9,075	Thompson (2) (1 pen)
8	16 September 1961	Leeds United	A	1–3	9,578	Thompson
9	18 September 1961	Brighton & Hove Albion	H	0–1	9,135	
10	23 September 1961	Norwich City	H	3–1	8,646	Thompson, Adam (2)
11	29 September 1961	Scunthorpe United	A	2–2	10,347	Thompson, Asprey
12	7 October 1961	Leyton Orient	A	0–3	10,621	
13	14 October 1961	Preston North End	H	1–1	8,409	Adam
14	21 October 1961	Plymouth Argyle	A	1–3	10,283	Adam
15	28 October 1961	Huddersfield Town	H	3–0	35,974	Adam, Thompson (2) (1 pen)
16	4 November 1961	Swansea Town	A	0–1	19,906	
17	11 November 1961	Walsall	H	2–1	24,869	Thompson, Bullock
18	18 November 1961	Luton Town	A	0–0	15,163	
19	25 November 1961	Newcastle United	H	3–1	22,009	Thompson, Mudie, S Matthews
20	2 December 1961	Middlesbrough	A	2–2	20,809	Thompson, Asprey
21	9 December 1961	Southampton	H	3–2	18,353	Thompson (2) (1 pen), Ratcliffe
22	16 December 1961	Rotherham United	A	2–1	15,537	Andrew, S Matthews
23	23 December 1961	Sunderland	H	1–0	24,682	Asprey
24	26 December 1961	Bury	A	2–0	15,699	Mudie, Ratcliffe
25	13 January 1962	Derby County	A	0–2	18,937	
26	20 January 1962	Bristol Rovers	A	2–0	8,852	Pyle (o.g.), Sykes (o.g.)
27	3 February 1962	Leeds United	H	2–1	21,921	Mudie, Allen
28	10 February 1962	Norwich City	A	0–1	31,304	
29	17 February 1962	Scunthorpe United	H	1–0	16,569	Nibloe
30	24 February 1962	Leyton Orient	H	0–1	21,846	
31	3 March 1962	Preston North End	A	2–1	19,091	Viollet, Mudie
32	10 March 1962	Plymouth Argyle	H	2–0	18,033	Thompson, Asprey
33	17 March 1962	Huddersfield Town	A	0–3	20,261	
34	24 March 1962	Swansea Town	H	0–0	14,752	
35	30 March 1962	Walsall	A	1–3	16,570	Nibloe
36	7 April 1962	Luton Town	H	2–1	7,506	Nibloe, Adam
37	11 April 1962	Bury	H	1–3	8,324	Nibloe
38	14 April 1962	Newcastle United	A	0–2	20,580	
39	21 April 1962	Middlesbrough	H	2–0	8,369	Viollet (2)
40	23 April 1962	Liverpool	A	1–2	41,005	Viollet
41	24 April 1962	Liverpool	H	0–0	15,472	
42	28 April 1962	Southampton	A	1–5	9,558	Viollet

=== FA Cup ===
Round	Date	Opponent	Venue	Result	Attendance	Scorers
R3	10 January 1962	Leicester City	A	1–1	35,545	Mudie
R3 Replay	15 January 1962	Leicester City	H	5–2	38,515	S Matthews, Allen, Bullock, Thompson, Nibloe
R4	27 January 1962	Blackburn Rovers	H	0–1	49,486	

=== League Cup ===
Round	Date	Opponent	Venue	Result	Attendance	Scorers
R1	13 September 1961	Southend United	A	1–0	7,389	Bullock
R2	10 October 1961	Charlton Athletic	A	1–4	6,119	Bullock

=== Friendlies ===
Match	Opponent	Venue	Result
1	John McCue's XI	H	6–2
2	GVAV	A	3–1
3	Fenerbahçe	A	0–1
4	Fenerbahçe	A	1–0
5	Galatasaray	A	0–2
6	İzmirspor	A	1–1
7	MKE Ankaragücü	A	1–0

== Squad statistics ==
Pos.	Name	League		FA Cup		League Cup		Total	
Pos.	Name	Apps	Goals	Apps	Goals	Apps	Goals	Apps	Goals
GK	(Republic of Ireland) Jimmy O'Neill	41	0	3	0	2	0	46	0
GK	(England) Brian Sherratt	1	0	0	0	0	0	1	0
DF	(England) Tony Allen	42	1	3	1	2	0	47	2
DF	(England) Ron Andrew	35	1	3	0	1	0	39	1
DF	(England) Alan Bloor	6	0	0	0	1	0	7	0
DF	(England) Eric Skeels	42	1	3	0	2	0	47	1
DF	(England) Terry Ward	4	0	0	0	0	0	4	0
MF	(England) Bill Asprey	42	4	3	0	2	0	47	4
MF	(England) Gerry Bridgwood	5	0	0	0	0	0	5	0
MF	(England) Tony Coleman	0	0	0	0	0	0	0	0
MF	(Scotland) Bobby Howitt	40	0	3	0	2	0	45	0
MF	(England) Alan Philpott	2	0	0	0	0	0	2	0
FW	(Scotland) Jimmy Adam	22	7	0	0	2	0	24	7
FW	(England) Peter Bullock	11	2	2	1	2	2	15	5
FW	(England) Jack Nibloe	18	4	3	1	0	0	21	5
FW	(England) Graham Matthews	10	2	0	0	2	0	12	2
FW	(England) Stanley Matthews	18	2	3	1	0	0	21	3
FW	(Scotland) Jackie Mudie	32	6	1	1	2	0	35	7
FW	(England) Tommy Randles	2	0	0	0	0	0	2	0
FW	(England) Don Ratcliffe	39	2	3	0	1	0	43	2
FW	(England) Tommy Thompson	37	16	3	1	1	0	41	17
FW	(England) Dennis Viollet	13	5	0	0	0	0	13	5
FW	(England) Brian Westlake	0	0	0	0	0	0	0	0
–	Own goals	–	2	–	0	–	0	–	2
