= 1950–51 Aston Villa F.C. season =

English football club season

Aston Villa
1950–51 season
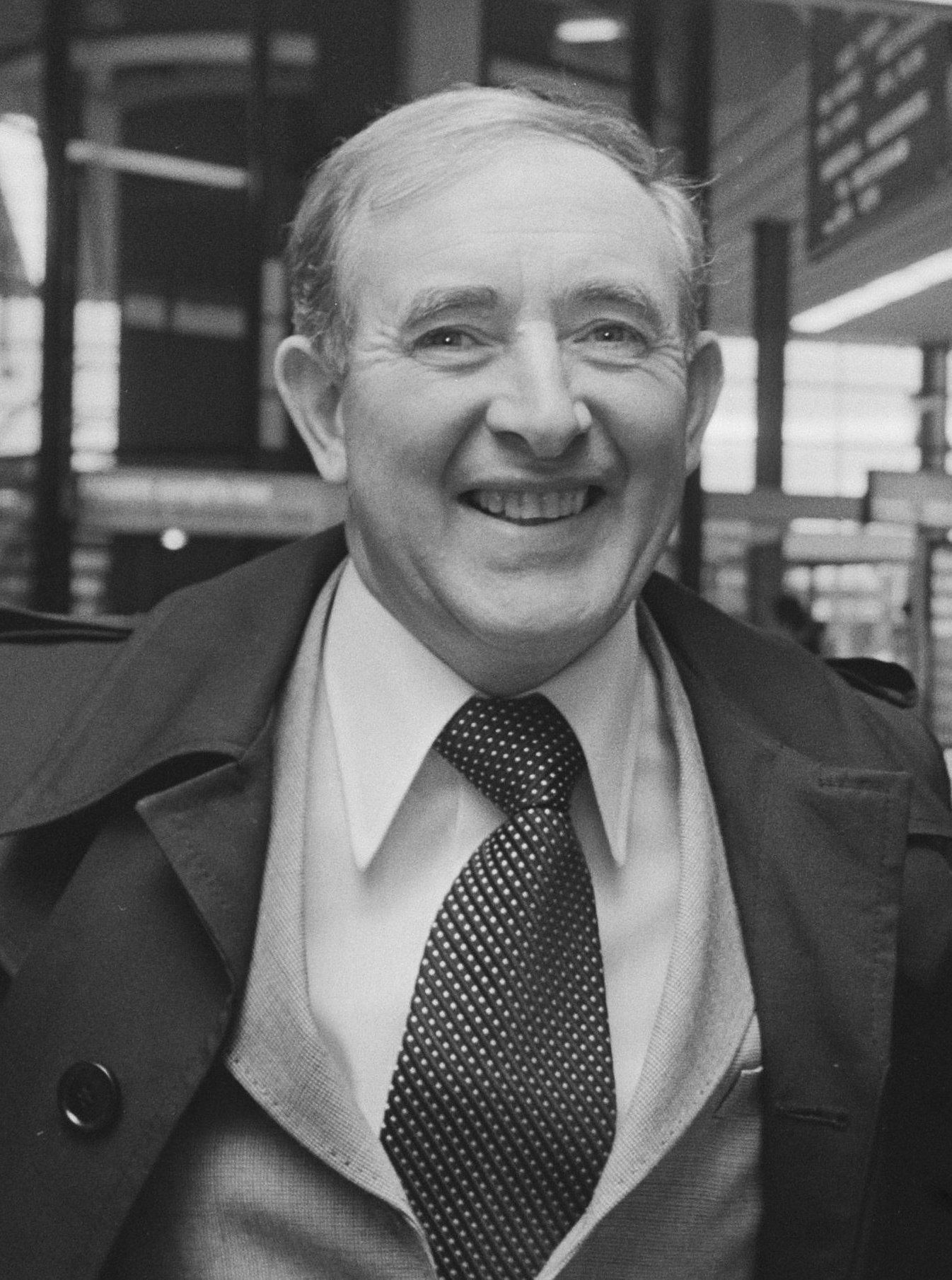
- Danny Blanchflower (1976), debut 17 March
- Manager: George Martin
- First Division: 15th
- FA Cup: Fourth round

The 1950–51 English football season was Aston Villa's 52nd season in The Football League. Villa played in the First Division, the top-tier of English football and manager George Martin's 1st season.

George Martin resigned from Newcastle in 1950 after establishing them as a top six side in the First Division and took over at struggling Aston Villa.

Danny Blanchflower transferred from Barnsley for a fee of £15,000, making his debut in March 1951. He made 155 senior appearances for Villa (148 in the League), before being sold during the 1954–55 season. There were also debuts for Stan Lynn (281), Peter Aldis (262), Tommy Thompson (149), Davy Walsh (108), Derek Pace (98) Jack Hindle (15), Geoff Sellars, and Ron Jeffries (2).

== Table ==
Pos	Team	Pld	W	D	L	GF	GA	GAv	Pts
13	Stoke City	42	13	14	15	50	59	0.847	40
14	Wolverhampton Wanderers	42	15	8	19	74	61	1.213	38
15	Aston Villa	42	12	13	17	66	68	0.971	37
16	West Bromwich Albion	42	13	11	18	53	61	0.869	37
17	Charlton Athletic	42	14	9	19	63	80	0.788	37

Source: World Football
Rules for classification: 1) Points; 2) Goal average; 3) Goals scored

=== Matches ===
19 August 1950 1	Aston Villa	2–0	West Bromwich Albion	Villa Park
	Dixon 32'; Gibson 67'	Report

21 August 1950 2	Aston Villa	3–1	Sunderland	Villa Park
	Miller Craddock 6'; Dixon 44'; Gibson 75'	Report
Note:

26 August 1950 3	Derby County	4–2	Aston Villa	Baseball Ground
		Report	Miller Craddock 11'; Les Smith 13'

30 August 1950 4	Sunderland	3–3	Aston Villa	Roker Park
		Report	Ivor Powell 44'; Dixon 78'; Miller Craddock 81'

2 September 1950 5	Aston Villa	1–1	Liverpool	Villa Park
	Moss 80'	Report

4 September 1950 6	Aston Villa	1–3	Manchester United	Villa Park
	Trevor Ford 79'	Report

9 September 1950 7	Fulham	2–1	Aston Villa	Craven Cottage
		Report	Billy Goffin 15'

13 September 1950 8	Manchester United	0–0	Aston Villa	Old Trafford
		Report
Note: 28-year-old Jack Hindle (#420) kept a clean sheet on his debut at Old Trafford.

16 September 1950 9	Aston Villa	0–1	Bolton	Villa Park
		Report

23 September 1950 10	Blackpool	1–1	Aston Villa	Bloomfield Road
		Report	Billy Goffin 89'

30 September 1950 11	Aston Villa	2–3	Tottenham Hotspur	Villa Park
	Tommy Thompson 32'; Les Smith 48'	Report

7 October 1950 12	Aston Villa	3–0	Newcastle United	Villa Park
	Ivor Powell 44'; Miller Craddock 48'; Tommy Thompson 54'	Report

14 October 1950 13	Huddersfield Town	4–2	Aston Villa	Leeds Road
		Report	George Edwards 66'; Trevor Ford 88'

21 October 1950 14	Aston Villa	1–1	Arsenal	Villa Park
	Larry Canning 72'	Report
Note: Villa had had just a single win in twelve games under their management committee structure but this was their best performance since beating leaders Newcastle. Despite conceding the first, Villa were the better side for much of the game and equalised in the second half. Winger Geoff Sellars (b 20 May 1930, Cheadle Hulme) made his first-team debut. Sellars stood 5ft 9ins and weighed 11st. Having completed his National Service, the 19-year-old joined Leeds United from Altrincham FC on 1 May 1950. He made one appearance with Leeds Reserves.

28 October 1950 15	Burnley	2–0	Aston Villa	Turf Moor
		Report

4 November 1950 16	Aston Villa	0–1	Middlesbrough	Villa Park
		Report

11 November 1950 17	Sheffield Wednesday	3–2	Aston Villa	Hillsborough
		Report	Miller Craddock 56'; Gibson 73'

18 November 1950 18	Aston Villa	4–2	Chelsea	Villa Park
	Dixon 33', 64'; Miller Craddock 36'; Tommy Thompson 81'	Report

25 November 1950 19	Portsmouth	3–3	Aston Villa	Fratton Park
		Report	Dixon 68', 76'; Tommy Thompson 79'

2 December 1950 20	Aston Villa	3–3	Everton	Villa Park
	Les Smith 16', 83'; Dicky Dorsett 78' (pen)	Report

9 December 1950 21	Stoke City	1–0	Aston Villa	Victoria Ground
		Report

16 December 1950 22	West Bromwich Albion	2–0	Aston Villa	The Hawthorns
		Report
Note: The previously ever-present Frank Moss Jr was absent due to Influenza. His place was taken by brother Amos.

23 December 1950 23	Aston Villa	1–1	Derby County	Villa Park
	Stan Lynn 22'	Report

25 December 1950 24	Charlton Athletic	2–2	Aston Villa	The Valley
		Report	Tommy Thompson 1'; Stan Lynn 2'

26 December 1950 25	Aston Villa	0–0	Charlton Athletic	Villa Park
		Report
Note: Geoff Sellars made his final appearance.

13 January 1951 26	Aston Villa	3–0	Fulham	Villa Park
	Stan Lynn 24'; Dixon 58'; Own Goal 89'	Report

20 January 1951 27	Bolton Wanderers	1–0	Aston Villa	Burnden Park
		Report

3 February 1951 28	Aston Villa	0–3	Blackpool	Villa Park
		Report

17 February 1951 29	Tottenham Hotspur	3–2	Aston Villa	White Hart Lane
		Report	Dixon 65'; Gibson 76'
Note: For the Spurs match, Villa experimented with playing Ron Jeffries as centre-forward. It was intended to move Davy Walsh to inside-left but he missed the match with a chill and was replaced with Dick Dorsett. Parkes was switched to left-back with Lynn coming in at right-back.

3 March 1951 30	Aston Villa	0–1	Huddersfield Town	Villa Park
		Report
Note: A vital "four-pointer" with Villa entering the match one point below Huddersfield in their relegation battle. Smith was declared fit and returned to the team as outside-left while Davy Walsh was re-instated as centre-forward. The defeat left Villa three points adrift of the Yorkshire club.

10 March 1951 31	Arsenal	2–1	Aston Villa	Highbury
		Report	Stan Lynn 58' (pen)
Note: With defeat against Arsenal, Villa found themselves second from bottom with 20 points from 31 games. They seemed doomed to be relegated to the Second Division.

17 March 1951 32	Aston Villa	3–2	Burnley	Villa Park
	Larry Canning 20'; Derek Pace 26'; Dixon 82'	Report
Note: Derek Pace and Danny Blanchflower made their debuts.

24 March 1951 33	Middlesbrough	2–1	Aston Villa	Ayresome Park
		Report	Dixon 20'	Attendance: 31,000
Note: Middlesbrough took command against a Villa team fighting relegation, but a lightening break against the run of play ended with Dixon chipping Boro keeper, Ugolini, to open the scoring. However, in the second-half, Borough's midfield superiority ensured their victory. Villa keeper Joe Rutherford recalled that team stayed at Saltburn for the match and the atmosphere was the gloomiest that he could recall.

26 March 1951 34	Wolverhampton Wanderers	2–3	Aston Villa	Molineux
		Report	Dixon 23'; Harry Parkes 42' (pen); Own Goal 54'
Note: Easter Monday: With the victory over Wolves, the mood in the dressing room turned from gloom to jubilation with one player declaring that Villa would not lose another match.

27 March 1951 35	Aston Villa	1–0	Wolverhampton Wanderers	Villa Park
	Tommy Thompson 42'	Report
Note: Tommy Thompson snatched Villa's only chance in the match.

31 March 1951 36	Aston Villa	2–1	Sheffield Wednesday	Villa Park
	Davy Walsh 44'; Tommy Thompson 57'	Report
Note: Billy Goffin recalled that the double over Wolves within the span of 48 hours meant everyone in the team was eager and full of heart and sure they were going to win again.

4 April 1951 37	Newcastle United	0–1	Aston Villa	St James' Park
		Report	Tommy Thompson 45'
Note: For the second time in three games, Tommy Thompson snatched Villa's only chance in the match.

7 April 1951 38	Chelsea	1–1	Aston Villa	Stamford Bridge
		Report	Herbert Smith 75'

14 April 1951 39	Aston Villa	3–3	Portsmouth	Villa Park
	Herbert Smith 23'; Dixon 75'; Harry Parkes 87' (pen)	Report

21 April 1951 40	Everton	1–2	Aston Villa	Goodison Park
		Report	Dixon 1'; Herbert Smith 75'

25 April 1951 41	Liverpool	0–0	Aston Villa	Anfield
		Report

5 May 1951 42	Aston Villa	6–2	Stoke City	Villa Park
	Tommy Thompson 3', 8'; Davy Walsh 27', 37'; Dixon 73'; Own Goal 76'	Report

Source: avfchistory.co.uk

== FA Cup ==
=== Third round ===
The 44 First and Second Division clubs entered the competition at this stage along with Gateshead, Northampton Town and Stockport County. The matches were scheduled to be played on Saturday, 6 January 1951, though two were postponed until later the same week.

Tie no	Home team	Score	Away team	Date	Attendance	Notes
5	Aston Villa	2–0	Burnley	6 January 1951		

=== Fourth round ===
The matches were played on Saturday, 27 January 1951.

Tie no	Home team	Score	Away team	Date	Attendance	Notes
4	Wolverhampton Wanderers	3–1	Aston Villa	27 January 1951		
