= Ron Andrew =

English footballer

Personal information
- Full name: Ronald Edward Harold Andrew
- Date of birth: 5 January 1936 (age 90)
- Place of birth: Bebington, England
- Positions: Centre-half; centre-forward

Youth career
- Ellesmere Port Town

Senior career*
Years	Team	Apps	(Gls)
1957–1964	Stoke City	115	(1)
1964–1965	Port Vale	8	(1)
Total		123	(2)
- * Club domestic league appearances and goals

Ronald Edward Harold Andrew (born 5 January 1936) is an English former footballer who played for Port Vale and Stoke City. A centre-half, he played 137 games in an eight-year career in the Football League.

== Career ==
Andrew played for Ellesmere Port Town before joining Stoke City in 1957. He broke into the first-team in 1959–60, playing in 32 matches at centre-back. At the end of what was a very poor season, manager Frank Taylor was replaced by his assistant Tony Waddington, who kept faith with Andrew. He was a regular for the "Potters" in 1960–61 and 1961–62 but lost his place once Waddington had brought in former England international Eddie Clamp in August 1962. He remained at the Victoria Ground, playing in the club's reserves, making the occasional first-team appearance as and when required.

In June 1964, he joined Potteries rivals Port Vale after manager Freddie Steele paid out a £3,000 fee. He scored on his debut in a 4–1 reverse at Workington on 22 August 1964. However, he picked up a flu at the end of the month and, after recovering, found himself out of the first team. He never played more than two consecutive games at Vale Park, and was instead given a free transfer by new manager Jackie Mudie in April 1965.

== Career statistics ==
Appearances and goals by club, season and competition
Club	Season	League			FA Cup		League Cup		Total	
Club	Season	Division	Apps	Goals	Apps	Goals	Apps	Goals	Apps	Goals
Stoke City	1957–58	Second Division	5	0	0	0	–		5	0
Stoke City	1958–59	Second Division	2	0	0	0	–		2	0
Stoke City	1959–60	Second Division	30	0	2	0	–		32	0
Stoke City	1960–61	Second Division	37	0	6	1	1	0	44	1
Stoke City	1961–62	Second Division	35	1	3	0	1	0	39	1
Stoke City	1962–63	Second Division	2	0	1	0	0	0	3	0
Stoke City	1963–64	First Division	4	0	0	0	0	0	4	0
Stoke City	Total		115	1	12	1	2	0	129	2
Port Vale	1964–65	Third Division	8	1	0	0	0	0	8	1
Career total			123	2	12	1	2	0	137	3

== Honours ==
Stoke City

- Football League Second Division: 1962–63
