= Tony Bentley =

English footballer (1939–2024)

Personal information
- Full name: Anthony Bentley
- Date of birth: 20 December 1939
- Place of birth: Stoke-on-Trent, England
- Date of death: 18 December 2024 (aged 84)
- Height: 5 ft 7 in (1.70 m)
- Positions: Full-back; forward

Senior career*
Years	Team	Apps	(Gls)
1958–1961	Stoke City	44	(15)
1961–1971	Southend United	381	(14)
1971–1973	Folkestone Town		
1973–1974	Ashford Town (Kent)		
Total		424	(29)
- * Club domestic league appearances and goals

Anthony Bentley (20 December 1939 – 18 December 2024) was an English footballer who played as a full-back or forward in the Football League for Stoke City and Southend United. Bentley died on 18 December 2024, at the age of 84.

== Career ==
Bentley was born in Trent Vale, Stoke-on-Trent, and began his career with local side Stoke City making his senior debut in the 1958–59 season. He played as a forward in 1959–60 scoring nine goals in 13 matches. Under new manager Tony Waddington in 1960–61 he scored six goals in 35 matches but Waddington was seemingly unimpressed by Bentley and he was sold to Third Division side Southend United in July 1961.

The "Shrimpers" manager Ted Fenton converted Bentley into a full-back and he became a consistent performer for the Roots Hall side in the 1960s playing ten seasons for the club racking up 419 appearances. He was given a testimonial match against his old club Stoke in 1966. After his time at Southend he played non-League football with Folkestone Town and Ashford Town (Kent), with whom he made 34 league appearances during season 1974–75, before emigrating to Canada.

== Career statistics ==
Appearances and goals by club, season and competition
Club	Season	League			FA Cup		League Cup		Total	
Club	Season	Division	Apps	Goals	Apps	Goals	Apps	Goals	Apps	Goals
Stoke City	1958–59	Second Division	2	0	0	0	–		2	0
Stoke City	1959–60	Second Division	13	9	0	0	–		13	9
Stoke City	1960–61	Second Division	28	6	6	0	1	0	35	6
Stoke City	Total		44	15	6	0	1	0	51	15
Southend United	1961–62	Third Division	41	2	1	0	1	0	43	2
Southend United	1962–63	Third Division	46	1	2	0	1	0	49	1
Southend United	1963–64	Third Division	45	0	2	0	1	0	48	0
Southend United	1964–65	Third Division	42	2	0	0	4	1	46	1
Southend United	1965–66	Third Division	46	1	3	2	3	0	52	3
Southend United	1966–67	Fourth Division	46	4	1	0	1	0	48	4
Southend United	1967–68	Fourth Division	34	1	1	0	2	0	37	1
Southend United	1968–69	Fourth Division	45	3	4	0	2	0	51	3
Southend United	1969–70	Fourth Division	7	0	0	0	6	0	13	0
Southend United	1970–71	Fourth Division	29	0	2	0	1	0	32	0
Southend United	Total		381	14	15	2	23	1	419	17
Career total			424	29	21	2	24	1	469	32
