= 1963–64 Stoke City F.C. season =

Stoke City
1963–64 season
- Chairman: Mr G. Taylor
- Manager: Tony Waddington
- Stadium: Victoria Ground
- Football League First Division: 17th (38 Points)
- FA Cup: Fifth round
- League Cup: Final (runners-up)
- Top goalscorer: League: John Ritchie (18); All: John Ritchie (30)
- Highest home attendance: 45,697 vs Manchester United (18 April 1964)
- Lowest home attendance: 20,488 vs Bolton Wanderers (22 February 1964)
- Average home league attendance: 30,315
Home colours

The 1963–64 season was Stoke City's 57th season in the Football League and the 33rd in the First Division.

With the club now on a high after gaining promotion back to England's top tier, Tony Waddington wasted no time in bringing in new signings to make sure relegation was avoided. He broke the transfer record and despite some concern during the season Stoke stayed up comfortably in 17th position. Stoke enjoyed success in the League Cup reaching the final against Leicester City before losing 4–3 over two legs.

== Season review ==
=== League ===
With the euphoria of winning promotion over, Waddington knew that his side had to be strengthened to have any hope of surviving in the First Division. The first big name signing he made was that of Peter Dobing for a club record fee of £37,500 from Manchester City and £6,000 for Bobby Irvine a young goalkeeper from Linfield. Also signed by Stoke this season was John Ritchie a centre forward signed from non-league Kettering Town for a small fee of £2,500. Ritchie scored 30 goals in his first season and went on to become Stoke's best ever goalscorer.

Stoke made a dream start to the 1963–64 season beating Tottenham Hotspur 2–1 at home on the opening match of the season, Jimmy McIlroy scoring both goals, and then accounting for Aston Villa 3–1 two days later. There followed though, a run of 10 matches without a win and Stoke found themselves at the wrong end of the table. Waddington was not happy with his defence and went out and bought Calvin Palmer from Nottingham Forest for £30,000 and George Kinnell from Aberdeen for £27,000 and another 'keeper Lawrie Leslie from West Ham United. On the other hand, he released Don Ratcliffe, and Ron Wilson. John Ritchie was introduced into the first team by October and he made an instant impression as he started scoring the first few of his 171 for the club. With Ritchie in full flow, things improved and in nine matches from early October to mid November, Stoke remained unbeaten. However around Christmas time the team again went through a bad spell losing eight times including some heavy defeats.

Stoke recovered well in the second half of the season and began to pull themselves away from the danger zone. A huge 9–1 win over Ipswich Town in March gave the team the confidence they needed and five wins in their last nine fixtures lifted Stoke to a final position of 17th, 10 points above relegated Bolton Wanderers.

=== FA Cup ===
Stoke beat Portsmouth 4–1 in the third round and then edged past Ipswich in a replay before losing in a replay to Swansea.

=== League Cup ===
Away from the league Stoke had a great run in this seasons League Cup having made an unspectacular start to the competition which started in 1960. In 1963–64 they made it through to the final where they met Leicester City. Stoke's run had seen them knock-out Scunthorpe United after three matches, Bolton Wanderers, Bournemouth, Rotherham United and then Manchester City in the semi-final. The final itself was played over two legs, Stoke drawing 1–1 at the Victoria Ground in the first clash. This proved to be insufficient as Leicester won the return leg at Filbert Street 3–2 giving them a 4–3 aggregate win and with it the League Cup.

== Final league table ==
Pos	Team	Pld	W	D	L	GF	GA	GAv	Pts
15	Fulham	42	13	13	16	58	65	0.892	39
16	Wolverhampton Wanderers	42	12	15	15	70	80	0.875	39
17	Stoke City	42	14	10	18	77	78	0.987	38
18	Blackpool	42	13	9	20	52	73	0.712	35
19	Aston Villa	42	11	12	19	62	71	0.873	34

Source: World Football
Rules for classification: 1) Points; 2) Goal average; 3) Goals scored

== Results ==
Stoke's score comes first

=== Legend ===
Win	Draw	Loss

=== Football League First Division ===
Match	Date	Opponent	Venue	Result	Attendance	Scorers
1	24 August 1963	Tottenham Hotspur	H	2–1	40,017	McIlroy (2) 17', 45'
2	26 August 1963	Aston Villa	A	3–1	39,041	Mudie 17'; Dobing (2) 26', 86'
3	31 August 1963	Wolverhampton Wanderers	A	1–2	43,217	Viollet 13'
4	4 September 1963	Aston Villa	H	2–2	36,649	Sleeuwenhoek (o.g) 30'; Viollet 54'
5	7 September 1963	Leicester City	H	3–3	34,453	Viollet (2), Asprey
6	11 September 1963	Sheffield United	A	1–4	25,347	McIlroy
7	14 September 1963	Nottingham Forest	H	0–1	34,458	
8	18 September 1963	Sheffield United	H	0–2	30,230	
9	21 September 1963	Blackburn Rovers	A	0–1	30,517	
10	28 September 1963	Blackpool	H	1–2	27,244	Clamp (pen)
11	5 October 1963	Chelsea	A	3–3	29,204	Mudie 6'; Tambling (o.g.) 19'; Harris (o.g.) 79'
12	9 October 1963	Arsenal	H	1–2	31,014	McIlroy
13	12 October 1963	Bolton Wanderers	A	4–3	17,366	McIlroy (2), Ritchie (2)
14	19 October 1963	Fulham	H	1–1	24,464	Ritchie
15	26 October 1963	West Bromwich Albion	A	3–2	23,800	Ritchie, Dobing, Palmer
16	2 November 1963	Burnley	H	4–4	37,279	Keith Bebbington 20'; Ritchie (2) 27', 44', Dobing 81'
17	9 November 1963	Ipswich Town	A	2–0	15,006	Ritchie 38'; Dobing 57'
18	16 November 1963	Sheffield Wednesday	H	4–4	30,695	Ritchie (3), Dobing
19	23 November 1963	Everton	A	0–2	47,143	
20	30 November 1963	Birmingham City	H	4–1	27,308	Ritchie (2), Dobing, Kinnell
21	7 December 1963	Manchester United	A	2–5	52,232	Ritchie 60'; Dobing 85'
22	14 December 1963	Tottenham Hotspur	A	1–2	36,209	Palmer
23	21 December 1963	Wolverhampton Wanderers	H	0–2	27,070	
24	26 December 1963	Liverpool	A	1–6	49,948	Ritchie 35'
25	11 January 1964	Leicester City	A	1–2	23,333	Clamp
26	18 January 1964	Nottingham Forest	A	0–0	17,872	
27	1 February 1964	Blackburn Rovers	H	3–1	32,275	Bridgwood, Bebbington (2)
28	8 February 1964	Blackpool	A	0–1	14,452	
29	22 February 1964	Bolton Wanderers	H	0–1	20,488	
30	29 February 1964	Arsenal	A	1–1	26,208	Kinnell
31	4 March 1964	Chelsea	H	2–0	21,264	Dobing 18'; Palmer 59'
32	7 March 1964	West Bromwich Albion	H	1–1	25,021	Viollet
33	21 March 1964	Ipswich Town	H	9–1	16,166	Viollet (3) 2', 43', 50'; Dobing 4'; McIlroy (2) 20', 79'; Ritchie (2) 51', 67'; Bebbington 90'
34	27 March 1964	West Ham United	A	1–4	29,484	Dobing
35	28 March 1964	Burnley	A	0–1	23,869	
36	31 March 1964	West Ham United	H	3–0	24,990	Dobing, McIlroy, Palmer
37	4 April 1964	Everton	H	3–2	35,315	Viollet 24'; Bebbington (2) 30', 90'
38	8 April 1964	Sheffield Wednesday	A	0–2	30,201	
39	11 April 1964	Birmingham City	A	1–0	19,890	Kinnell (pen)
40	18 April 1964	Manchester United	H	3–1	45,697	Palmer 18', Viollet 21', Ritchie
41	25 April 1964	Fulham	A	3–3	15,748	Dobing (2), Bridgwood
42	29 April 1964	Liverpool	H	3–1	32,149	Bebbington 48'; Ritchie 71'; Dobing 88'

=== FA Cup ===
Round	Date	Opponent	Venue	Result	Attendance	Scorers
R3	4 January 1964	Portsmouth	H	4–1	28,966	Ritchie (2), Viollet (2)
R4	25 January 1964	Ipswich Town	A	1–1	21,894	McIlroy 37'
R4 Replay	29 January 1964	Ipswich Town	H	1–0	34,612	McIlroy 65'
R5	15 February 1964	Swansea Town	H	2–2	40,095	McIlroy, Matthews
R5 Replay	18 February 1964	Swansea Town	A	0–2	29,582	

=== League Cup ===
Round	Date	Opponent	Venue	Result	Attendance	Scorers
R2	25 September 1963	Scunthorpe United	A	2–2	6,945	Dobing (2)
R2 Replay	16 October 1963	Scunthorpe United	H	3–3	11,060	Dobing, Ritchie (2)
R2 2nd Replay	22 October 1963	Scunthorpe United	N	1–0	4,297	Ritchie
R3	29 October 1963	Bolton Wanderers	H	3–0	11,285	Ritchie (2), Bebbington
R4	27 November 1963	Bournemouth & Boscombe Athletic	H	2–1	9,766	Ritchie (2)
Quarter-final	16 December 1963	Rotherham United	H	3–2	12,988	Ritchie (2), Kinnell
Semi-final 1st Leg	15 January 1964	Manchester City	H	2–0	21,019	Ritchie, Asprey
Semi-final 2nd Leg	2 February 1964	Manchester City	A	0–1	16,894	
Final 1st Leg	15 April 1964	Leicester City	H	1–1	22,369	Bebbington
Final 2nd Leg	22 April 1964	Leicester City	A	2–3	25,372	Kinnell, Viollet

=== Friendlies ===
Match	Opponent	Venue	Result
1	FK Austria Wien	A	0–1
2	Aberdeen	A	0–2
3	Benfica	H	0–1
4	Belenenses	A	0–0
5	Club Santa Fe	A	2–3
6	Independiente Medellín	A	3–0
7	Club Universidad de Chile	A	0–0
8	Boca Juniors	A	2–1
9	River Plate	A	0–5
10	San Lorenzo	A	1–2

== Squad statistics ==
Pos.	Name	League		FA Cup		League Cup		Total	
Pos.	Name	Apps	Goals	Apps	Goals	Apps	Goals	Apps	Goals
GK	(Northern Ireland) Bobby Irvine	11	0	0	0	1	0	12	0
GK	(Scotland) Lawrie Leslie	25	0	5	0	5	0	35	0
GK	(Republic of Ireland) Jimmy O'Neill	6	0	0	0	4	0	10	0
DF	(England) Tony Allen	41	0	5	0	10	0	56	0
DF	(England) Ron Andrew	4	0	0	0	0	0	4	0
DF	(England) Alan Bloor	0	0	0	0	1	0	1	0
DF	(Scotland) George Kinnell	24	3	5	0	5	2	34	5
DF	(England) Eric Skeels	39	0	5	0	10	0	54	0
DF	(South Africa) Eddie Stuart	23	0	1	0	6	0	30	0
DF	(Scotland) Ron Wilson	2	0	0	0	0	0	2	0
MF	(England) Bill Asprey	29	1	4	0	9	1	42	2
MF	(England) Gerry Bridgwood	16	2	0	0	6	0	22	2
MF	(England) Eddie Clamp	18	2	4	0	6	0	28	2
MF	(England) John Flowers	5	0	0	0	0	0	5	0
MF	(Scotland) Jackie Mudie	4	3	0	0	1	0	5	3
MF	(England) Calvin Palmer	30	5	5	0	5	0	40	5
FW	(England) Keith Bebbington	36	7	4	0	9	2	49	9
FW	(England) Peter Dobing	39	16	2	0	9	3	50	19
FW	(Northern Ireland) Jimmy McIlroy	32	9	4	3	7	0	43	12
FW	(England) Stanley Matthews	9	0	4	1	0	0	13	1
FW	(England) Don Ratcliffe	8	0	0	0	1	0	9	0
FW	(England) John Ritchie	29	18	4	2	9	10	42	30
FW	(England) Dennis Viollet	32	10	3	2	6	1	41	13
–	Own goals	–	1	–	0	–	0	–	1
