= 1962–63 Stoke City F.C. season =

Stoke City
1962–63 season
- Chairman: Mr G. Taylor
- Manager: Tony Waddington
- Stadium: Victoria Ground
- Football League Second Division: 1st (53 Points)
- FA Cup: Third Round
- League Cup: Third Round
- Top goalscorer: League: Dennis Viollet (23); All: Dennis Viollet (23)
- Highest home attendance: 42,366 vs Sunderland (15 April 1962)
- Lowest home attendance: 11,596 vs Charlton Athletic (12 September 1963)
- Average home league attendance: 25,446
Home colours

The 1962–63 season was Stoke City's 56th season in the Football League and the 23rd in the Second Division. 1963 was also Stoke's centenary year which was celebrated with a friendly match at the Victoria Ground against Spanish giants Real Madrid.

In the club's centenary year Stoke managed to finally achieve promotion back to the top flight after a ten-year absence. Despite a slow start Stoke went on two fantastic unbeaten runs and although there was a nervy end to the season a Stanley Matthews inspired 2–0 over Luton Town in the final home match secured Stoke both promotion to the First Division and the Second Division title.

== Season review ==
=== League ===
The 1962–63 season saw Stoke officially celebrate its centenary and the hope from the supporters was that it would be marked by promotion. A failure to win any of their first six matches caused a few grumblings from the fans but a four-goal haul from Dennis Viollet helped Stoke beat Charlton Athletic 6–3 to set the tone for the season. Keith Bebbington and Eddie Clamp joined the club as well as Stoke's first African footballer, Eddie Stuart from South Africa.

From late August to 8 December Stoke went 18 matches unbeaten and were on track for promotion. The run came to an end away at Leeds United ten days before Christmas, but after winning at Rotherham United on Boxing Day, the season came to an end as one of the worst winters on record gripped the country. After two months without football Stoke played again on 2 March and beat Walsall 3–0. Just after this match Waddington completed a transfer when he signed Northern Ireland and Burnley striker Jimmy McIlroy for £25,000. His debut for Stoke ended in a loss as Stoke fell to a 6–0 defeat at Norwich City. Stoke then won six straight to end the season.

A draw at Roker Park was quickly followed by victories over Cardiff City and Sunderland at home while a vital point was gain in a thrilling 3–3 draw at Huddersfield Town. Three straight defeats caused some concern but a 1–0 win at Chelsea meant that Stoke were within one win of gaining a return to the First Division. And so over 12,000 Stoke fans made the trip to Bury to see them gain promotion at Gigg Lane but it did not go well and the "Shakers" certainly stirred things up by winning 2–1 to put the celebrations on hold. For the penultimate match against Luton Town at the Victoria Ground a crowd of 33,644 turned up to see if Stoke could gain promotion. Jackie Mudie gave Stoke the lead and then Stanley Matthews sealed the promotion in typical Matthews style as he dribbled around Town 'keeper Ron Baynham to send the home crowd ecstatic and end ten years in the Second Division.

On 24 April 1963 Stoke arranged a friendly with the famous Real Madrid. The match was seen as the celebration for the club's centenary. The match finished 2–2 with Dennis Viollet and Jimmy McIlroy scoring for Stoke while Félix Ruiz and Ferenc Puskás scored for Real.

=== FA Cup ===
Stoke lost at the first attempt against Leeds United but it was seen as a blessing in disguise by the management as they wanted to concentrate on gaining promotion.

=== League Cup ===
After beating Walsall, Stoke lost 3–1 away at Aston Villa.

== Final league table ==
Pos	Team	Pld	W	D	L	GF	GA	GAv	Pts	Qualification or relegation
1	Stoke City (C, P)	42	20	13	9	73	50	1.460	53	Promotion to the First Division
2	Chelsea (P)	42	24	4	14	81	42	1.929	52	Promotion to the First Division
3	Sunderland	42	20	12	10	84	55	1.527	52	
4	Middlesbrough	42	20	9	13	86	85	1.012	49	
5	Leeds United	42	19	10	13	79	53	1.491	48	

Rules for classification: 1) Points; 2) Goal average; 3) Goals scored
(C) Champions; (P) Promoted

== Results ==
Stoke's score comes first

=== Legend ===
Win	Draw	Loss

=== Football League Second Division ===
Match	Date	Opponent	Venue	Result	Attendance	Scorers
1	18 August 1962	Leeds United	H	0–1	27,118	
2	22 August 1962	Derby County	A	1–1	24,408	Skeels
3	25 August 1962	Swansea Town	A	1–2	16,474	Griffiths (o.g.)
4	29 August 1962	Derby County	H	3–3	19,009	Asprey (2), Viollet
5	1 September 1962	Chelsea	H	0–0	19,286	
6	8 September 1962	Luton Town	A	0–0	6,878	
7	12 September 1962	Charlton Athletic	H	6–3	11,596	Viollet (4), Ratcliffe, Bebbington
8	15 September 1962	Southampton	H	3–1	16,062	Bebbington, Mudie (2)
9	18 September 1962	Charlton Athletic	A	3–0	17,872	Bebbington, Mudie, Asprey
10	22 September 1962	Scunthorpe United	A	0–0	11,364	
11	29 September 1962	Bury	H	2–0	24,480	Viollet, Mudie
12	6 October 1962	Newcastle United	H	3–1	26,775	Viollet (2), (1 Pen), Skeels
13	13 October 1962	Walsall	A	0–0	15,862	
14	20 October 1962	Norwich City	H	3–0	20,375	Viollet (2), G Matthews
15	27 October 1962	Grimsby Town	A	1–1	14,419	Mudie
16	3 November 1962	Plymouth Argyle	H	2–2	24,281	Mudie, Skeels
17	10 November 1962	Preston North End	A	1–1	14,677	Bebbington
18	17 November 1962	Portsmouth	H	3–1	21,142	Mudie, Viollet (2)
19	24 November 1962	Cardiff City	A	1–1	21,900	Mudie
20	1 December 1962	Huddersfield Town	H	2–1	29,856	Viollet, Stuart
21	8 December 1962	Middlesbrough	A	2–2	11,799	Viollet, Thompson
22	15 December 1962	Leeds United	A	1–3	19,331	Mudie
23	26 December 1962	Rotherham United	A	2–1	11,717	Viollet, Asprey
24	2 March 1963	Walsall	H	3–0	25,462	Mudie (3)
25	9 March 1963	Norwich City	A	0–6	25,950	
26	16 March 1963	Grimsby Town	H	4–1	24,626	Viollet (2), Mudie, Asprey
27	23 March 1963	Plymouth Argyle	A	1–0	22,956	Ratcliffe
28	27 March 1963	Swansea Town	H	2–0	26,532	Mudie (2)
29	30 March 1963	Preston North End	H	3–0	21,863	Mudie (2), Viollet (pen)
30	1 April 1963	Rotherham United	H	3–1	31,226	Viollet, Ratcliffe, McIlroy
31	6 April 1963	Portsmouth	A	3–0	19,256	Mudie, Ratcliffe, McIlroy
32	12 April 1963	Sunderland	A	0–0	62,138	
33	13 April 1963	Cardiff City	H	1–0	30,419	Viollet
34	15 April 1963	Sunderland	H	2–1	42,366	Viollet (2) (1 pen)
35	20 April 1963	Huddersfield Town	A	3–3	27,779	Viollet, McIlroy, Skeels
36	27 April 1963	Middlesbrough	H	0–1	25,733	
37	1 May 1963	Newcastle United	A	2–5	25,900	McIlroy (2)
38	4 May 1963	Scunthorpe United	H	2–3	25,530	Ratcliffe, Stuart
39	11 May 1963	Chelsea	A	1–0	66,199	McIlroy
40	14 May 1963	Bury	A	1–2	25,376	Mudie
41	18 May 1963	Luton Town	H	2–0	33,644	Mudie, S Matthews
42	22 May 1963	Southampton	A	0–2	18,295	

=== FA Cup ===
Round	Date	Opponent	Venue	Result	Attendance	Scorers
R3	6 March 1963	Leeds United	A	1–3	36,873	Bebbington 70'

=== League Cup ===
Round	Date	Opponent	Venue	Result	Attendance	Scorers
R2	25 September 1962	Walsall	A	2–1	10,583	G Matthews, Bebbington
R3	10 October 1962	Aston Villa	A	1–3	20,373	G Matthews

=== Friendlies ===
Match	Opponent	Venue	Result
1	Shamrock Rovers & Bohemian XI	A	3–4
2	Limerick	A	5–2
3	Sheffield United	A	0–2
4	Real Madrid	H	2–2
5	Israel XI	A	1–0
6	Bnei Yehuda Tel Aviv	A	1–1

== Squad statistics ==
Pos.	Name	League		FA Cup		League Cup		Total	
Pos.	Name	Apps	Goals	Apps	Goals	Apps	Goals	Apps	Goals
GK	(Republic of Ireland) Jimmy O'Neill	42	0	1	0	2	0	45	0
DF	(England) Ron Andrew	2	0	1	0	0	0	3	0
DF	(England) Tony Allen	41	0	1	0	2	0	44	0
DF	(England) Alan Bloor	0	0	0	0	1	0	1	0
DF	(England) Eric Skeels	38	4	1	0	2	0	41	4
DF	(South Africa) Eddie Stuart	40	2	0	0	1	0	41	2
DF	(England) Terry Ward	9	0	0	0	1	0	10	0
DF	(Scotland) Ron Wilson	1	0	0	0	0	0	1	0
MF	(England) Bill Asprey	42	5	1	0	1	0	44	5
MF	(England) Gerry Bridgwood	4	0	1	0	1	0	6	0
MF	(England) Eddie Clamp	32	0	1	0	1	0	34	0
MF	(Scotland) Bobby Howitt	10	0	0	0	1	0	11	0
MF	(England) Alan Philpott	1	0	0	0	0	0	1	0
FW	(England) Keith Bebbington	19	4	1	1	2	1	22	6
FW	(England) Graham Matthews	4	1	0	0	2	2	6	3
FW	(England) Stanley Matthews	31	1	0	0	0	0	31	1
FW	(Northern Ireland) Jimmy McIlroy	18	6	0	0	0	0	18	6
FW	(Scotland) Jackie Mudie	39	20	0	0	1	0	40	20
FW	(England) Jack Nibloe	2	0	0	0	0	0	2	0
FW	(England) Don Ratcliffe	42	5	1	0	2	0	45	5
FW	(England) John Ritchie	3	0	1	0	1	0	5	0
FW	(England) Tommy Thompson	5	1	0	0	0	0	5	1
FW	(England) Dennis Viollet	37	23	1	0	1	0	39	23
–	Own goals	–	1	–	0	–	0	–	1
