= Jimmy Adam =

Scottish footballer (1931–2008)

Personal information
- Full name: James Adam
- Date of birth: 13 May 1931
- Place of birth: Blantyre, Scotland
- Date of death: 26 September 2008 (aged 77)
- Place of death: Melbourne, Australia
- Position: Midfielder

Youth career
- Blantyre Celtic

Senior career*
Years	Team	Apps	(Gls)
1950–1951	Aldershot	1	(0)
1951–1953	Spennymoor United		
1953–1959	Luton Town	137	(22)
1959–1961	Aston Villa	24	(3)
1961–1962	Stoke City	22	(7)
1962–1964	Falkirk	22	(4)
1964	South Melbourne Hellas	18	(12)
Total		224	(48)
- * Club domestic league appearances and goals

James Adam (13 May 1931 – 26 September 2008) was a Scottish footballer who played in the Football League for Aston Villa, Luton Town and Stoke City.

== Career ==
Born in Blantyre, Adam began his career with local youth club Blantyre Celtic before moving south to English club Aldershot in 1950. However, the young Adam was only able to make a single league appearance for the club during the 1950–51 season and then left and joined non-league Spennymoor United.

In 1953, Adam signed for Luton Town, where he made 138 appearances during a six-year spell in which he helped the club gain promotion to the First Division in 1954–55. By the time of Luton's relegation from the First Division in 1960, Adam had joined Aston Villa, where he spent two seasons before signing for Stoke City where he spent the 1961–62 season scoring seven goals in 24 appearances before returning to Scotland with Falkirk. He later emigrated to Australia, where he played for South Melbourne Hellas.

== Death ==
Adam died in Melbourne on 26 September 2008, at the age of 77.

== Career statistics ==
Appearances and goals by club, season and competition
Club	Season	League			FA Cup		League Cup		Total	
Club	Season	Division	Apps	Goals	Apps	Goals	Apps	Goals	Apps	Goals
Aldershot	1950–51	Third Division South	1	0	0	0	—		1	0
Luton Town	1953–54	Second Division	3	0	0	0	—		3	0
Luton Town	1954–55	Second Division	25	9	0	0	—		25	9
Luton Town	1955–56	First Division	30	5	0	0	—		30	5
Luton Town	1956–57	First Division	18	1	0	0	—		18	1
Luton Town	1957–58	First Division	32	3	1	0	—		33	3
Luton Town	1958–59	First Division	29	4	0	0	—		29	4
Luton Town	Total		137	22	1	0	—		138	22
Aston Villa	1959–60	Second Division	21	3	1	0	—		22	3
Aston Villa	1960–61	First Division	3	0	0	0	0	0	3	0
Aston Villa	Total		24	3	1	0	0	0	25	3
Stoke City	1961–62	Second Division	22	7	0	0	2	0	24	7
Career Total			183	32	2	0	2	0	187	32
