= Raymond White =

Raymond White may refer to:

- Raymond L. White (1943–2018), American geneticist
- Raymond Maurice White (1909–1972), English badminton player

== See also ==
- Ray White (disambiguation)
- Raymond Wilding-White (1922–2001), American composer and artist
- Raymond A. Whyte (1923–2003), surrealist artist
