= Tommy Thompson (footballer, born 1928) =

English footballer

Personal information
- Full name: Thomas Thompson
- Date of birth: 10 November 1928
- Place of birth: Fencehouses, Houghton-le-Spring, England
- Date of death: 15 September 2015 (aged 86)
- Height: 5 ft 5 1/2 in (1.66 m)
- Position: Inside forward

Senior career*
Years	Team	Apps	(Gls)
1947–1950	Newcastle United	20	(6)
1950–1955	Aston Villa	149	(67)
1955–1961	Preston North End	189	(116)
1961–1963	Stoke City	42	(17)
1963–1964	Barrow	44	(16)
Total		444	(222)

International career
1951–1957	England	2	(0)
- * Club domestic league appearances and goals

Thomas Thompson (10 November 1928 – 15 September 2015) was an English footballer who played in the Football League for Aston Villa, Barrow, Newcastle United, Preston North End and Stoke City as well as the England national team.

== Career ==
Tommy "Topper" Thompson was born in Fencehouses, Houghton-le-Spring, County Durham in 1928. He played for Lumley YMCA at junior level and while only 17 he was signed by Newcastle United in January 1946. He made his league debut in the 1947-48 promotion season at Coventry City and scored twice in his four second division appearances. Over the next two seasons he played only 16 games, scoring 4 goals.

Newcastle manager George Martin sold Thompson to Aston Villa in 1950 for £12,500. Martin soon followed him to Villa. He made his debut against Blackpool in September of that year, the first of 149 league games for Villa, in which he scored 67 goals. Whilst at Villa Park he earned himself an England cap. He played for England in the 1–1 draw with Wales in Cardiff on 20 October 1951. He reached double figures in all but one of his five seasons, managing only 9 in the 1952-53 season. At the end of the 1954-55 season Aston Villa announced they would sell Thompson, but only for the right price. On top of his league record he scored 9 goals in 16 FA Cup appearances, to total 76 goals in 165 matches.

Thompson was sold to Preston North End in August 1955 for £27,000, after their initial offer of £20,000 was rejected. New signing Thompson scored after two minutes on his debut, a 4–0 away win at Everton. In quick time he and Tom Finney created a formidable partnership. Thompson finished his first season with 23 goals with Finney netting 18. The following season Thompson scored 26, his contribution in a 57-goal partnership with Finney. His third season saw him score 34 goals in 41 league games, setting a club record for most goals in a top flight season that still stands today. He also won his second England cap, six years after his first, as England beat Scotland 2–1 at Wembley on 6 April 1957. The next two seasons saw him play only 34 times, scoring 14 goals. After six seasons at Deepdale he ended his Preston career after scoring 129 goals in 212 matches.

He joined Stoke City in August 1961 and scored on his debut against Rotherham United, as he top scored for the Potters with 16 league goals. He played five more times for Stoke, scoring once more the following season, before leaving to join Barrow, who played in the fourth division. Over the next two seasons at Barrow, he scored 16 goals in 44 league appearances. He retired at the end of 1963-64 season, ending his league career with 222 goals in 444 appearances. 187 of those goals were scored in the first division, which ranks Tommy Thompson at 37 of the all-time top scorers in the top flight of English football.

He died at the age of 86 on 15 September 2015.

== International career ==
He acquired his first cap against Wales during the 1951–52 season. He won his second cap in April 1957.

== Career statistics ==
=== Club ===
Appearances and goals by club, season and competition
Club	Season	League			FA Cup		League Cup		Total	
Club	Season	Division	Apps	Goals	Apps	Goals	Apps	Goals	Apps	Goals
Newcastle United	1947–48	Second Division	4	2	0	0	–		4	2
Newcastle United	1948–49	First Division	10	1	0	0	–		10	1
Newcastle United	1949–50	First Division	6	3	0	0	–		6	3
Newcastle United	Total		20	6	0	0	–		20	6
Aston Villa	1950–51	First Division	31	10	2	1	–		33	11
Aston Villa	1951–52	First Division	36	13	1	0	–		37	13
Aston Villa	1952–53	First Division	22	9	5	2	–		27	11
Aston Villa	1953–54	First Division	34	21	1	0	–		35	21
Aston Villa	1954–55	First Division	26	14	7	6	–		33	20
Aston Villa	Total		149	67	16	9	–		165	76
Preston North End	1955–56	First Division	42	23	1	1	–		43	24
Preston North End	1956–57	First Division	38	26	5	3	–		43	29
Preston North End	1957–58	First Division	41	34	1	0	–		42	34
Preston North End	1958–59	First Division	34	19	5	2	–		39	21
Preston North End	1959–60	First Division	21	12	6	2	–		27	14
Preston North End	1960–61	First Division	13	2	2	2	4	2	19	6
Preston North End	Total		189	116	20	10	4	2	213	126
Stoke City	1961–62	Second Division	37	16	3	1	1	0	41	17
Stoke City	1962–63	Second Division	5	1	0	0	0	0	5	1
Stoke City	Total		42	17	3	1	1	0	46	18
Barrow	1962–63	Fourth Division	16	6	0	0	0	0	16	6
Barrow	1963–64	Fourth Division	28	10	2	1	1	1	31	12
Barrow	Total		44	16	2	1	1	1	47	18
Career total			444	222	41	21	6	3	491	246

=== International ===
National team	Year	Apps	Goals
England	1951	1	0
England	1957	1	0
Total		2	0
