= Denis Wilson (footballer) =

English footballer (1936–2026)

Personal information
- Date of birth: 30 April 1936
- Place of birth: Bebington, Cheshire, England
- Date of death: 28 February 2026 (aged 89)
- Place of death: Chester, Cheshire, England
- Position: Full-back

Youth career
- 1952–1954: Wrexham

Senior career*
Years	Team	Apps	(Gls)
1954–1955	Wrexham	0	(0)
1955–1958	Rhyl		
1958–1961	Stoke City	15	(0)
- Bangor City
- * Club domestic league appearances and goals

Denis Wilson (30 April 1936 – 28 February 2026) was an English footballer who played as a full-back in the Football League for Stoke City.

== Career ==
Wilson started his football career at Welsh side Wrexham's youth team; whilst he was a regular for their Reserve side, he never was able to break into the first team and left in 1955 to join Welsh league side Rhyl. He spent three years at Rhyl and was a stand out performer in the league which attracted the attention of a number of Football League sides. He joined Stoke City in 1958 with Frank Taylor acquiring the full backs signature. He made his debut for the "Potters" in a 6–1 win against Lincoln City in September 1959. Wilson went on to make 13 more appearances for City before new manager Tony Waddington deemed him surplus to requirements and was released in 1961. He re-entered the Welsh league with Bangor City.

== Personal life and death ==
Wilson was born in Bebington, Cheshire on 30 April 1936. He later lived in Chester, where he ran a pet shop. He died in Chester on 28 February 2026, at the age of 89.

== Career statistics ==
Appearances and goals by club, season and competition
Club	Season	League			FA Cup		Total	
Club	Season	Division	Apps	Goals	Apps	Goals	Apps	Goals
Stoke City	1959–60	Second Division	10	0	0	0	10	0
Stoke City	1960–61	Second Division	5	0	4	0	9	0
Career total			15	0	4	0	19	0
