= Bobby Griffiths =

English footballer

Personal information
- Full name: Robert William Griffiths
- Date of birth: 15 September 1942 (age 84)
- Place of birth: Aldridge, England
- Position: Wing half

Senior career*
| Years | Team | Apps | (Gls) |
| 1959–1960 | Rhyl | | |
| 1960–1961 | Stoke City | 0 | (0) |
| 1962–1963 | Chester | 2 | (0) |
| 1963 | Bangor City | | |
- * Club domestic league appearances and goals

Robert William Griffithss (born 15 September 1942) is an English footballer, who played as a wing half in the Football League for Chester.

== Career statistics ==
Appearances and goals by club, season and competition
| Club | Season | League | | | FA Cup | | Total | |
| Club | Season | Division | Apps | Goals | Apps | Goals | Apps | Goals |
|---|---|---|---|---|---|---|---|---|
| Stoke City | 1960–61 | Second Division | 0 | 0 | 0 | 0 | 0 | 0 |
| Chester | 1962–63 | Fourth Division | 2 | 0 | 0 | 0 | 2 | 0 |
| Career total | | | 2 | 0 | 0 | 0 | 2 | 0 |
