= Derek Pace =

English footballer

Personal information
- Date of birth: 11 March 1932
- Place of birth: Bloxwich, England
- Date of death: 17 October 1989 (aged 57)
- Position: Striker

Youth career
- Walsall Schoolboys
- Bloxwich Scouts
- Bloxwich Wesley
- Walsall Wood

Senior career*
Years	Team	Apps	(Gls)
1950–1957	Aston Villa	98	(40)
1957–1964	Sheffield United	253	(140)
1964–1965	Notts County	29	(15)
1966	Walsall	5	(1)
Total		284	(196)
- * Club domestic league appearances and goals

Derek "Doc" Pace (11 March 1932 – 17 October 1989) was a footballer who played in the position of striker for Sheffield United and Aston Villa.

== Early career ==
Pace went to Essington junior school in Essington and was captain for Walsall Schoolboys playing at centre half. On leaving school, he went on to play for amateur sides Bloxwich Scouts in the Bloxwich Combination, Bloxwich Wesley in the Walsall Minor League and had a spell with Walsall Wood in the Walsall Senior League during the 1948–49 season.

== Professional career ==
=== Aston Villa ===
Derek was signed by Aston Villa from Bloxwich Scouts in September 1949. He scored on his debut against Burnley on 17 March 1951. That month, with defeat against Arsenal, Villa had found themselves second from bottom with 20 points from 31 games. They seemed doomed to be relegated to the Second Division, but Pace's contribution lifted the spirits of the team and ended a run of six-straight defeats.

Not long after his signing he was called up for two years National service in the Medical Corps where he obtained the nickname "Doc". He came out of the Army in June 1953. Derek was small in stature for a centre forward at five feet eight inches, and less than 12 stone, but was nonetheless hardy and tough, and a real problem for defenders to cope with. He played as an inside-forward with Aston Villa, and although he enjoyed lengthy runs in the side, he did not quite fully establish himself at Villa Park. In 1953–1954 season, Derek was one of seven forwards who appeared for Aston Villa following the departure of regular forward Trevor Ford – who had joined Sunderland. He seized his opportunity and scored six goals from six league matches. The following season, he played in 18 league matches scoring one goal also made one appearance in the FA Cup.

In 1955–56, Villa were next to bottom of the league three points behind Sheffield United with three matches remaining. Sheffield United manager Joe Mercer had tried to sign Pace in mid-season, but his attempts were blocked by Villa. And in the closing games it was Derek's goals that did a great deal to save Villa from relegation, they eventually finished third from bottom on goal difference and avoided relegation. In 1956–57 Derek played in 21 league matches scoring six goals and in six cup games scoring two goals. Although he missed out on being selected for the Aston Villa 1957 FA Cup Final side, being twelfth man after playing in all the rounds up to the semi-final.

He started the 1957–58 season with Villa and played in 12 games scoring three goals – including the Charity Shield side that was beaten by Manchester United. In total he scored 42 league and FA Cup goals in 106 matches for Aston Villa.

=== Sheffield United ===
On 26 December 1957, he was finally signed by Sheffield United manager Joe Mercer for £12,000. It was with the Blades he began to excel as a striker. He made his debut for United on the day he had signed – scoring after just eight minutes, against Blackburn Rovers at Bramall Lane on 26 December 1957.

At Sheffield United he switched his playing position to centre-forward, and met with increasing success. Pace was a superb header of the ball and some of the goals he scored with his head were spectacular. He could also shoot with both feet and had outstanding anticipation and timing. Many of his goals were scored from half chances in the goalmouth.

He was an ever-present in the side when United achieved First Division status again in season 1960–61 with Pace scoring 26 goals, including a FA Cup run in which the team reached the Semi-finals. He became a favourite with the Blades fans, who warmed to his enthusiasm, sportsmanship, quick shooting and brilliant heading ability, and his signing was a factor in bringing better days ahead to the Lane.

Immediately after his signing, the improvement to the Blades team was instantly apparent. Between 22 February 1958 and 5 April 1958, United won eight consecutive league matches, with Pace scoring nine of the goals in this period. The spell included one of United's most memorable FA Cup victories. The occasion was a 4th Round against Tottenham Hotspur at White Hart Lane in front of 51,536 spectators. Pace put United ahead in the first minute and United won the tie 3–0. Pace was a consistent scorer for the Blades, and started 1960 in great form. Between 2 January and 5 March that year, he scored 16 goals in eight matches, including a hat-trick against his former club and (at the time) Division Two league leaders Aston Villa at Villa Park on 27 February 1960. His last match for Sheffield United was against Burnley at Bramall Lane on 29 August 1964. In total he had scored 140 goals in 253 league appearances (175 goals in 302 league and cup games) for United. He was the Blades top scorer for six successive seasons.

=== After the Blades ===
In December 1964, he moved to Notts County where he scored 15 goals from 29 matches. He then left to join Walsall in July 1966, only playing four matches plus one as substitute, and scoring one goal – a flying header at Grimsby Town on 27 August 1966.

In his career, he scored a grand total of 233 goals in 444 games.

== After Football ==
After retiring from football, Derek became a sales representative for Churchfield Springs Ltd of West Bromwich. He died on 17 October 1989.
