= George Martin (Scottish footballer) =

Scottish footballer and manager

Personal information
- Full name: George Scott Martin
- Date of birth: 14 July 1899
- Place of birth: Bothwell, Scotland
- Date of death: 11 December 1972 (aged 73)
- Place of death: Luton, England
- Height: 5 ft 9 in (1.75 m)
- Position: Inside forward

Senior career*
Years	Team	Apps	(Gls)
–	Cadzow St Anne's		
1920–1922	Hamilton Academical	23	(7)
1922	→ Bo'ness (loan)	13	(11)
1922	→ Bo'ness (loan)	7	(8)
1922–1928	Hull City	204	(55)
1928–1932	Everton	85	(31)
1932	Middlesbrough		
1933–1937	Luton Town	98	(27)

Managerial career
- 1944–1947: Luton Town
- 1947–1950: Newcastle United
- 1950–1953: Aston Villa
- 1965–1966: Luton Town
- * Club domestic league appearances and goals

George Scott Martin (14 July 1899 – 11 December 1972) was a Scottish football player and manager whose position was inside forward. He played over 200 times for Hull City, won an English Football League winner's medal with Everton in 1928, and served Luton Town as a player and manager.

== Playing career ==
Martin started his career in Scotland with Hamilton Academical before moving south to join Hull City, where he made 218 total appearances and scored 58 goals.

He was signed by Everton in the latter stages of the 1927–28 season and made ten appearances in their ultimately successful title run in to earn his only major honour in the game, the Football League Championship. Martin's time at Goodison Park was mixed however as he spent the majority of his time as a fringe player during the club's relegation in 1930 and promotion again in 1931, before finally making just two appearances in Everton's 1932 title-winning side, which was not sufficient to earn a medal.

Martin left Everton for a short spell at Middlesbrough and then finished his playing career at Luton Town (105 total appearances, 29 goals) before moving into management.

== Managerial career ==
Martin became a coach at Luton Town in August 1939, and was appointed manager on 4 December 1944 and guided Luton through their first post-war season.

He was appointed as Newcastle United's first manager since the end of World War II in May 1947. One of his decisions at the club was surprisingly to sell prolific goalscorer and fans' favourite Len Shackleton to Sunderland for £13,000. This concerned some supporters and Martin was at first criticised for making this move. However the protests were short-lived as, without Shackleton, Newcastle gained promotion to the First Division after fourteen years in the Second. Popular players he introduced included the club's current second highest all-time goal-scorer, Jackie Milburn. He sold Colin Gibson and Tommy Thompson to Aston Villa. Having establishing them as a top six side in the First Division, George Martin resigned from Newcastle.

In December 1950 Martin took over at struggling Aston Villa. Martin was succeeded by Eric Houghton.

He later returned to Luton for a short-lived spell in 1965; he left a year later.

== Personal life ==
Martin could of followed an operatic career with his tenor voice while his sculptured bust of Julius Caesar won a first-class diploma at an Edinburgh exhibition.
