= Graham Matthews =

English footballer

Personal information
- Full name: Graham Matthews
- Date of birth: 2 November 1942 (age 83)
- Place of birth: Newcastle-under-Lyme, England
- Position: Forward

Senior career*
Years	Team	Apps	(Gls)
1960–1963	Stoke City	16	(3)
1963–1965	Walsall	67	(21)
1965–1968	Crewe Alexandra	58	(19)
Total		141	(43)
- * Club domestic league appearances and goals

Graham Matthews (born 2 November 1942) is an English former footballer who played in the Football League for Crewe Alexandra, Stoke City and Walsall.

== Career ==
Matthews was born in Newcastle-under-Lyme and joined his local club Stoke City in 1960. He played twice in 1960–61 and made twelve appearances in 1961–62 scoring twice. Unfortunately for Matthews in October 1961 Stoke manager Tony Waddington brought the legendary Stanley Matthews back to the club. Matthews had no hope of retaining his place in the side at the expense of someone like the former England international and he left for Walsall in 1963.

He spent two seasons at Fellows Park where he made 73 appearances scoring 22 goals before joining Crewe Alexandra in 1965. He played 61 times for the "Railwaymen" scoring 19 goals and helped the team finish in 5th position in the Fourth Division in 1966–67.

== Career statistics ==
Club	Season	League			FA Cup		League Cup		Total	
Club	Season	Division	Apps	Goals	Apps	Goals	Apps	Goals	Apps	Goals
Stoke City	1960–61	Second Division	2	0	0	0	0	0	2	0
Stoke City	1961–62	Second Division	10	2	0	0	2	0	12	2
Stoke City	1962–63	Second Division	4	1	0	0	2	2	6	3
Stoke City	Total		16	3	0	0	4	2	20	5
Walsall	1963–64	Third Division	44	15	1	0	3	0	48	15
Walsall	1964–65	Third Division	23	6	0	0	2	1	25	7
Walsall	Total		67	21	1	0	5	1	73	22
Crewe Alexandra	1965–66	Fourth Division	32	9	1	0	2	0	34	9
Crewe Alexandra	1966–67	Fourth Division	25	10	1	0	1	0	27	10
Crewe Alexandra	1967–68	Fourth Division	1	0	0	0	0	0	1	0
Crewe Alexandra	Total		58	19	2	0	3	0	61	19
Career Total			141	43	3	0	12	3	156	46
