= John Anderson (soccer, born 1937) =

Scottish-born professional footballer (1937–2021)

Personal information
- Full name: John Hugh Todd Anderson
- Date of birth: 11 January 1937
- Place of birth: Johnstone, Scotland
- Date of death: July 2021 (aged 84)
- Position: Winger

Youth career
- Johnstone Burgh

Senior career*
Years	Team	Apps	(Gls)
1957–1961	Stoke City	24	(2)
1962–1963	Greenock Morton	17	(3)
1963–1964	Third Lanark	12	(3)
- South Melbourne

International career
1965	Australia	5	(0)
- * Club domestic league appearances and goals

John Hugh Todd Anderson (11 January 1937 – July 2021) was a professional footballer who played in the Football League for Stoke City and represented the Australian national team five times in full international matches.

== Career ==
Anderson was born in Johnstone and played for local side Johnstone Burgh. In 1957 he joined Stoke City and he made an instant impact scoring on his debut against Rotherham United in September 1957. However Anderson was used as a backup during his four-year spell at the Victoria Ground making 24 appearances scoring twice.

In the mid-1960s after a spell back in Scotland with Greenock Morton and Third Lanark he moved to Australia to play with South Melbourne where he came to the notice of the Australian selectors. He eventually played eight matches for the Socceroos, five of which were full internationals.

== Career statistics ==
=== Club ===
Appearances and goals by club, season and competition
Club	Season	League			FA Cup		Total	
Club	Season	Division	Apps	Goals	Apps	Goals	Apps	Goals
Stoke City	1957–58	Second Division	4	1	0	0	4	1
Stoke City	1958–59	Second Division	6	1	0	0	6	1
Stoke City	1959–60	Second Division	4	0	0	0	4	0
Stoke City	1960–61	Second Division	10	0	0	0	10	0
Career Total			24	2	0	0	24	2

=== International ===
National team	Year	Apps	Goals
Australia	1965	5	0
Total		5	0
