= Ray White (footballer, born 1941) =

English footballer

Personal information
- Full name: Raymond White
- Date of birth: 5 February 1941 (age 85)
- Place of birth: Ely, Cambridgeshire, England
- Position: Wing half

Senior career*
Years	Team	Apps	(Gls)
1958–1959	Millwall	2	(0)
1960–1961	Stoke City	0	(0)
Total		2	(0)
- * Club domestic league appearances and goals

Raymond White (born 5 February 1941) is an English former professional footballer who played in the Football League for Millwall.

== Career ==
White was born in Ely, Cambridgeshire and began his career with Millwall playing twice for the Lions in the 1958–59 season. He joined Second Division side Stoke City in 1960 but only played a few reserve team matches before deciding to pursue a different career.

== Career statistics ==
Appearances and goals by club, season and competition
Club	Season	League			FA Cup		Total	
Club	Season	Division	Apps	Goals	Apps	Goals	Apps	Goals
Millwall	1958–59	Fourth Division	2	0	0	0	2	0
Stoke City	1960–61	Second Division	0	0	0	0	0	0
Career total			2	0	0	0	2	0
