= Keith Bebbington =

English footballer

Personal information
- Full name: Keith Richard Bebbington
- Date of birth: 4 August 1943 (age 83)
- Place of birth: Cuddington Heath, Cheshire, England
- Position: Winger

Youth career
- 1960–1962: Stoke City

Senior career*
Years	Team	Apps	(Gls)
1962–1966	Stoke City	100	(17)
1966–1972	Oldham Athletic	237	(39)
1972–1974	Rochdale	60	(6)
1974–1979	Winsford United		
Total		398	(62)
- * Club domestic league appearances and goals

Keith Richard Bebbington (born 4 August 1943) is an English former footballer who played in the Football League for Oldham Athletic, Rochdale and Stoke City.

== Career ==
Bebbington was a quick left winger who came through the youth team at Stoke City. He made his debut against Luton Town in September 1962. He had a good debut season with Stoke as in 1962–63 they won the Second Division title. In 1963–64 Stoke made it to the 1964 Football League Cup Final against Leicester City, Bebbington scoring the first goal of a two legged tie becoming Stoke's first cup final goalscorer, Stoke however lost 4–3 on aggregate.

In the 1965–66 season the substitute was introduced and Bebbington was Stoke's first sub replacing Dennis Viollet on the opening day away at Arsenal. He spent two more seasons at the Victoria Ground and after making 124 appearances, scoring 22 goals he left for Oldham Athletic. He became a key figure with the "Latics" as he made 237 appearances in the league in six years with the club. He finished his career with Rochdale.

== Career statistics ==
Appearances and goals by club, season and competition
Club	Season	League			FA Cup		League Cup		Total	
Club	Season	Division	Apps	Goals	Apps	Goals	Apps	Goals	Apps	Goals
Stoke City	1962–63	Second Division	19	4	1	1	2	1	22	6
Stoke City	1963–64	First Division	36	7	4	0	9	2	49	9
Stoke City	1964–65	First Division	23	3	0	0	4	1	27	4
Stoke City	1965–66	First Division	22	3	0	0	4	0	26	3
Stoke City	Total		100	17	5	1	19	4	124	22
Oldham Athletic	1966–67	Third Division	38	3	4	4	0	0	42	7
Oldham Athletic	1967–68	Third Division	37	4	1	0	1	0	39	4
Oldham Athletic	1968–69	Third Division	41	12	1	1	2	0	44	13
Oldham Athletic	1969–70	Fourth Division	37	7	2	1	1	0	40	8
Oldham Athletic	1970–71	Fourth Division	43	10	1	0	2	1	46	11
Oldham Athletic	1971–72	Third Division	41	3	1	0	2	0	44	3
Oldham Athletic	Total		237	39	10	6	8	1	255	46
Rochdale	1972–73	Third Division	37	3	1	0	2	0	40	3
Rochdale	1973–74	Third Division	23	3	3	0	1	0	27	3
Rochdale	Total		60	6	4	0	3	0	67	6
Career total			397	62	19	7	30	5	446	74

== Honours ==
Stoke City

- Football League Second Division: 1962–63
- Football League Cup runner-up: 1963–64

Oldham Athletic

- Football League Fourth Division third-place promotion: 1970–71
