= Don Ratcliffe =

English footballer (1934–2014)

Personal information
- Full name: Donald Ratcliffe
- Date of birth: 13 November 1934
- Place of birth: Newcastle-under-Lyme, England
- Date of death: 19 October 2014 (aged 79)
- Position: Winger

Senior career*
Years	Team	Apps	(Gls)
1954–1963	Stoke City	238	(16)
1963–1966	Middlesbrough	65	(3)
1965–1967	Darlington	86	(12)
1967–1969	Crewe Alexandra	47	(2)
1969–1970	Northwich Victoria		
1970	Bangor City		
Total		436	(33)
- * Club domestic league appearances and goals

Donald Ratcliffe (13 November 1934 – 19 October 2014) was an English footballer who played in the Football League for Crewe Alexandra, Darlington, Middlesbrough and Stoke City.

== Career ==
Ratcliffe was born in Newcastle-under-Lyme and joined Stoke City in May 1953 after being recommended to the club by a local grocer who had seen him playing football in the street. He made his debut at home to Bury on Christmas Day in 1954–55 and of his 11 appearances in that season six were against Bury. He became the prankster of Stoke's dressing room and was a hugely popular figure amongst the players. On the pitch Ratcliffe's natural position was left wing although he played in every position bar centre half causing Stoke manager Tony Waddington to boast that Ratcliffe was the first £100,000 footballer – as they could have sold him for £10,000 for each position. Under Waddington he was a regular and played in every match in 1962–63 as Stoke won the Second Division title.

He fell out of favour with Waddington in the First Division and he was sold to Middlesbrough for £27,500 in September 1963. Ratcliffe's time at "Boro" was not that good as he brands manager Raich Carter as 'a waste of space' which ended with Ratcliffe joining Darlington in February 1966 helping the club gain promotion in 1965–66 which was followed by an instant relegation. He moved on again to Crewe Alexandra and again gained promotion from the Fourth Division and he ended his career with non-league Northwich Victoria. Ratcliffe died on 19 October 2014 at the age of 79.

== Career statistics ==
Appearances and goals by club, season and competition
Club	Season	League			FA Cup		League Cup		Total	
Club	Season	Division	Apps	Goals	Apps	Goals	Apps	Goals	Apps	Goals
Stoke City	1954–55	Second Division	6	0	5	2	—		11	2
Stoke City	1955–56	Second Division	8	0	0	0	—		8	0
Stoke City	1956–57	Second Division	1	0	0	0	—		1	0
Stoke City	1957–58	Second Division	31	3	2	0	—		33	3
Stoke City	1958–59	Second Division	31	1	0	0	—		31	1
Stoke City	1959–60	Second Division	31	1	0	0	—		31	1
Stoke City	1960–61	Second Division	41	4	6	1	1	0	48	5
Stoke City	1961–62	Second Division	39	2	3	0	1	0	43	2
Stoke City	1962–63	Second Division	42	5	1	0	2	0	45	5
Stoke City	1963–64	First Division	8	0	0	0	1	0	9	0
Stoke City	Total		238	16	17	3	5	0	260	19
Middlesbrough	1963–64	Second Division	25	2	1	0	0	0	26	2
Middlesbrough	1964–65	Second Division	26	0	4	0	0	0	30	0
Middlesbrough	1965–66	Second Division	14	1	1	0	0	0	15	1
Middlesbrough	Total		65	3	6	0	0	0	71	3
Darlington	1965–66	Fourth Division	21	5	0	0	0	0	21	5
Darlington	1966–67	Third Division	42	4	4	1	3	2	49	7
Darlington	1967–68	Fourth Division	23	3	1	1	5	2	29	6
Darlington	Total		86	12	5	1	8	4	99	16
Crewe Alexandra	1967–68	Fourth Division	20	2	0	0	0	0	20	2
Crewe Alexandra	1968–69	Third Division	27	0	3	0	2	0	32	0
Crewe Alexandra	Total		47	2	3	0	2	0	52	2
Career total			436	33	31	4	15	4	482	41

== Honours ==
Stoke City

- Football League Second Division champions: 1962–63

Darlington

- Football League Fourth Division runner-up: 1965–66

Crewe Alexandra

- Football League Fourth Division 4th place promotion: 1967–68
