= Larry Canning =

Scottish footballer

Personal information
- Full name: Lawrence Canning
- Date of birth: 1 November 1925
- Place of birth: Cowdenbeath, Scotland
- Date of death: 6 April 2012 (aged 86)
- Place of death: Nottingham, England
- Position: Wing half

Youth career
- Broughty Amateurs

Senior career*
Years	Team	Apps	(Gls)
19??–1943	Paget Rangers	?	(?)
1943–1954	Aston Villa	39	(3)
1954–1956	Kettering Town	?	(?)
1956–1957	Northampton Town	2	(0)
1957–19??	Nuneaton Borough	?	(?)
- * Club domestic league appearances and goals

Lawrence "Larry" Canning (1 November 1925 – 6 April 2012) was a Scottish footballer who played for Aston Villa during the 1940s and 1950s, then later served on the board. Canning also worked as a journalist and broadcaster, regularly contributing post-match reports on BBC Radio 2's Sports Report programme throughout the 1970s and 1980s.

== Death ==
On 6 April 2012, Canning died as a result of vascular dementia – aged 86.
