= Fincham (surname) =

Fincham is a surname. Notable people with the surname include:

- George Fincham (1828–1910), British organ builder
- Gordon Fincham (1935–2012), British football player
- Joe Fincham (born 1964), American football player and coach
- John Fincham (1926–2005), British geneticist
- Paul Fincham (born 1959), British composer
- Peter Fincham (born 1956), British television producer and executive
