= Tommy Hymers =

English footballer (1935–1987)

Personal information
- Full name: Thomas Hymers
- Date of birth: 29 April 1935
- Place of birth: Thorne, England
- Date of death: May 1987 (aged 52)
- Place of death: Sheffield, England
- Position: Defender

Senior career*
| Years | Team | Apps | (Gls) |
- Frickley Colliery
| 1959–1961 | Doncaster Rovers | 23 | (0) |
- * Club domestic league appearances and goals

Thomas Hymers (29 April 1935 – May 1987) was an English footballer who played as a defender (association football) in the Football League for Doncaster Rovers.

== Career ==
Hymers was born in Thorne, which was then in the West Riding of Yorkshire. He worked in Frickley Colliery and also played for their football team. He joined Doncaster Rovers in 1958 and played in 22 matches during the 1959–60 season and five matches in 1960–61 which included Doncaster's first match in the League Cup, a 3–1 victory over Stoke City. Unfortunately for Hymers he scored an own goal, giving him the dubious honour of being Stoke's first goalscorer in the League Cup.

== Career statistics ==
Appearances and goals by club, season and competition
| Club | Season | League | | FA Cup | | League Cup | | Total | |
| Club | Season | Apps | Goals | Apps | Goals | Apps | Goals | Apps | Goals |
|---|---|---|---|---|---|---|---|---|---|
| Doncaster Rovers | 1959–60 | 19 | 0 | 3 | 0 | 0 | 0 | 22 | 0 |
| Doncaster Rovers | 1960–61 | 4 | 0 | 0 | 0 | 1 | 0 | 5 | 0 |
| Career total | | 23 | 0 | 3 | 0 | 1 | 0 | 27 | 0 |
