= Jack Hindle (footballer, born 1921) =

English footballer

Personal information
- Full name: John Hindle
- Date of birth: 10 November 1921
- Place of birth: Preston, England
- Date of death: 21 January 1987 (aged 65)
- Place of death: Barrow-in-Furness, England
- Position: Goalkeeper

Senior career*
Years	Team	Apps	(Gls)
193?–1946	Clifton BC		
1946–1948	Preston North End	1	(0)
1948–1950	Barrow	84	(0)
1950–1951	Aston Villa	15	(0)
1951–1956	Barrow	182	(0)
- * Club domestic league appearances and goals

John Hindle (10 November 1921 Preston, Lancashire – 21 January 1987) was an English professional footballer who made 282 appearances in the Football League playing as a goalkeeper for Preston North End, Barrow (two spells) and Aston Villa.

The 28-year-old Hindle kept a clean sheet on his Villa debut on 13 September 1950, a goalless draw at Old Trafford.

Jack Hindle died in Barrow-in-Furness, Cumbria in 1987 at the age of 65.
