= Joe Nibloe =

Scottish footballer (1903–1976)

Personal information
- Date of birth: 23 November 1903
- Place of birth: Corkerhill, Scotland
- Date of death: 25 October 1976 (aged 72)
- Place of death: Doncaster, England
- Position: Full back

Youth career
- Glencairn Green

Senior career*
Years	Team	Apps	(Gls)
- Shawfield Juniors
1923–1924	Rutherglen Glencairn		
1924–1932	Kilmarnock	279	(1)
1932–1934	Aston Villa	48	(0)
1934–1939	Sheffield Wednesday	116	(0)
Total		443	(1)

International career
1929–1932	Scotland	11	(0)
1929	Scottish League XI	2	(0)
- * Club domestic league appearances and goals

Joseph Nibloe (23 November 1903 – 25 October 1976) was a Scottish professional footballer who played for Kilmarnock, Aston Villa and Sheffield Wednesday in a 15-year career between 1924 and 1939, during which time he made 459 club appearances including cup games. He also made eleven appearances for Scotland.

Nibloe was a full back who could play on either flank, initially starting his career as a left back then switching to the right later in his career. He is one of a select group of players who won national cup winner's medals in both England and Scotland; he played in three cup finals in the space of six years.

== Playing career ==
=== Early days ===
Nibloe was born in the small hamlet of Corkerhill, just to the south-west of Glasgow, on 23 November 1903. He was a late developer as a footballer, playing as a part-time amateur until the age of 20. In his youth he played for Glencairn Green, Shawfield Juniors and Rutherglen Glencairn while working at the Harland & Wolff shipyard in Govan as a brass moulder. Initially he was a centre forward, once scoring five goals in a game for Shawfield, but his career took off when he converted into a left back and was offered a professional contract by Kilmarnock in June 1924.

=== Kilmarnock ===
Nibloe seldom featured in his first season at Kilmarnock but became a regular in his second after the departure of David Gibson. In his eight years at Rugby Park he made 279 appearances for Killie in the two major competitions, helping them win the Scottish Cup on 6 April 1929, defeating Rangers 2–0 in the final. Kilmarnock reached the Scottish Cup final again in 1932 but this time Nibloe had to settle for a runners-up medal as they lost to Rangers after a replay. Soon after this he signed for Aston Villa for the 1932–33 season for a fee of £1,800 after a disagreement with Kilmarnock over a benefit match. His run of 132 consecutive league appearances between October 1925 and February 1929 (ending only because he was travelling as a reserve with the Scottish national team) is still a club record.

=== Aston Villa ===
Nibloe struggled to find a regular place in the Villa team in that first season as the team finished runners up to Arsenal in Division One being kept out of the side by the near veteran Tommy Mort. However the following season (1933–34) Nibloe dislodged Mort from the team and displayed excellent form, and it caused something of an uproar when he signed for Sheffield Wednesday in the summer of 1934 in a part-exchange deal which saw George Beeson going to Villa Park along with £2,500.

=== Sheffield Wednesday ===
Wednesday's signing of the experienced 30-year-old Nibloe was seen as something of a coup by the club, no doubt the influence of manager Billy Walker made a difference as Walker had been a teammate of Nibloe's at Villa the previous season. Competition for the left back spot was keen even though Wednesday had lost Ernie Blenkinsop to Liverpool the previous season; Ted Catlin had stepped into Blenkinsop's boots and Nibloe was forced to switch to right back to secure a place in the team. He made his Wednesday debut in the opening fixture of the 1934–35 season on 25 August 1934, in a 4–1 home victory over Stoke City.

Nibloe played in five out the six FA Cup ties in 1935 as Wednesday won the trophy, missing just the 3rd round home tie against Oldham Athletic in January. He also played as Wednesday won the 1935 FA Charity Shield. Nibloe made his final appearance for Wednesday in the final game of the 1937–38, in his final two seasons he was more of a squad player as his place was challenged by Jack Ashley. He retired from playing competitive football at the outbreak of World War II at the age of 35.

=== International ===
Shortly after winning the Scottish Cup in 1929, Nibloe was called up for the first of his eleven appearances for Scotland on 13 April 1929, featuring in a 1–0 victory over England at Hampden Park. All his Scottish caps came while he was with Kilmarnock and he is still today the club's most capped player, his last appearance for his country came in May 1932 against France. He also played twice for the Scottish League representative side in his time at Rugby Park, and later featured for the Sheffield FA in their annual challenge match against his native Glasgow.

== After football ==
Nibloe worked in a munitions factory in Stocksbridge during the war. After the conflict he continued to live in Stocksbridge and work in the Samuel Fox steelworks. He died on 25 October 1976 in Doncaster, aged 72.

His son Jack Nibloe also played professional football for Sheffield United, Stoke City, Doncaster Rovers and Stockport County between 1958 and 1964; he was killed in a road accident on the Woodhead Pass in November 1964.

== Honours ==
Sheffield Wednesday

- FA Cup: 1934–35
