= Jack Nibloe =

English footballer

Personal information
- Full name: John Allister Nibloe
- Date of birth: 1 June 1939
- Place of birth: Sheffield, England
- Date of death: 12 November 1964 (aged 25)
- Place of death: Stocksbridge, England
- Position: Forward

Senior career*
Years	Team	Apps	(Gls)
1958–1961	Sheffield United	25	(4)
1961–1962	Stoke City	20	(4)
1962–1964	Doncaster Rovers	36	(7)
1964	Stockport County	22	(4)
Total		103	(19)
- * Club domestic league appearances and goals

John Allister "Jack" Nibloe (1 June 1939 – 12 November 1964) was an English footballer who played in The Football League for Doncaster Rovers, Sheffield United, Stockport County and Stoke City. He was involved in a car crash in 1964 and he died of his injuries. His father Joe was also a footballer.

== Career ==
Nibloe was born in Sheffield and began his career with local club Sheffield United in 1958. He played 26 matches for the "Blades" in three seasons scoring five goals in 1960–61 as they gained promotion to the top tier. Nibloe was though sold to Stoke City where he played 21 times in 1961–62 scoring five goals. After managing to make just two appearances in 1962–63, Tony Waddington let Nibloe sign for Fourth Division Doncaster Rovers. At Belle Vue he scored eight goals in 43 matches combining his time doing national service in Germany flying back on week ends for the matches. In August 1964 he joined Stockport County, scoring five goals in 24 matches before he was involved in a fatal car accident near Stocksbridge on 12 November 1964 aged 25.

== Career statistics ==
Appearances and goals by club, season and competition
Club	Season	League			FA Cup		League Cup		Total	
Club	Season	Division	Apps	Goals	Apps	Goals	Apps	Goals	Apps	Goals
Sheffield United	1958–59	Second Division	4	0	0	0	0	0	4	0
Sheffield United	1959–60	Second Division	5	0	0	0	0	0	5	0
Sheffield United	1960–61	Second Division	16	4	0	0	1	1	17	5
Sheffield United	Total		25	4	0	0	1	1	26	5
Stoke City	1961–62	Second Division	18	4	3	1	0	0	21	5
Stoke City	1962–63	Second Division	2	0	0	0	0	0	2	0
Stoke City	Total		19	4	3	1	0	0	22	5
Doncaster Rovers	1962–63	Fourth Division	16	5	3	0	0	0	19	5
Doncaster Rovers	1963–64	Fourth Division	20	2	3	1	1	0	24	3
Doncaster Rovers	Total		36	7	6	1	1	0	43	8
Stockport County	1964–65	Fourth Division	22	4	1	1	1	0	24	5
Career total			103	19	10	3	3	1	116	23
