= Norman Sykes =

English footballer

Personal information
- Date of birth: 16 October 1936
- Place of birth: Bristol, England
- Date of death: 9 December 2009 (aged 73)
- Position: Wing half

Youth career
- –: Bristol Five Boys' Club
- –1952: Bristol Boys
- 1952–1953: Bristol Rovers

Senior career*
Years	Team	Apps	(Gls)
1953–1964	Bristol Rovers	214	(5)
1964	Toronto City		
1964–1965	Plymouth Argyle	3	(0)
1965–1967	Stockport County	52	(7)
1967	Doncaster Rovers	15	(0)
1967–????	Altrincham		
Total		284	(12)

International career
- England Schoolboys
- England Youth
- * Club domestic league appearances and goals

Norman A.J. Sykes (16 October 1936 – 9 December 2009) was a professional footballer who played in The Football League for Bristol Rovers, Plymouth Argyle, Stockport County, and Doncaster Rovers between 1953 and 1967.

Sykes played youth football for various teams in his home town of Bristol before signing his first professional contract with Bristol Rovers on his seventeenth birthday, with whom he spent twelve years, including one year as a youth team player. In 1961 he had an unsuccessful trial with Chelsea and returned to Bristol Rovers until in 1964 he joined Plymouth Argyle for a transfer fee of £2,000, but during his time there he was dogged by injury and made just three League appearances for them. In the summer of 1964 he played in the Eastern Canada Professional Soccer League with Toronto City.

He played 52 League games for Stockport County in seventeen months between September 1965 and February 1967, before spending the remainder of the 1966–67 season with Doncaster Rovers. Following that he dropped down to non-League football, where he played for Altrincham.

After his footballing career Sykes opened a teetotal nightclub in Manchester in 1975, and later lived and worked in Manchester.
