= Gordon Fincham =

English footballer

Personal information
- Full name: Gordon Richard Fincham
- Date of birth: 8 January 1935
- Place of birth: Peterborough, England
- Date of death: June 2012 (aged 77)
- Place of death: Peterborough, England
- Height: 6 ft 2 in (1.88 m)
- Position: Half back

Youth career
- –: Fletton

Senior career*
Years	Team	Apps	(Gls)
1952–1958	Leicester City	50	(0)
1958–1963	Plymouth Argyle	136	(4)
1963–1965	Luton Town	64	(0)
–	Port Elizabeth City		
- * Club domestic league appearances and goals

Gordon Richard Fincham (8 January 1935 – June 2012) was an English footballer who played as a half back. Born in Peterborough, he made 250 appearances in the Football League for Leicester City, Plymouth Argyle and Luton Town.
