= Jackie Mudie =

Scottish footballer

- Mudie in the 1956–57 season

Personal information
- Full name: John Knight Mudie
- Date of birth: 10 April 1930
- Place of birth: Dundee, Scotland
- Date of death: 2 March 1992 (aged 61)
- Place of death: Stoke-on-Trent, England
- Height: 5 ft 4 in (1.63 m)
- Position: Centre forward

Youth career
- Lochee Harp
- Stobswell Juniors

Senior career*
Years	Team	Apps	(Gls)
1947–1961	Blackpool	322	(144)
1961–1963	Stoke City	88	(32)
1961	→ Toronto City (loan)		
1963–1967	Port Vale	54	(9)
1967	Oswestry Town		
Total		464	(185)

International career
1956–1958	Scotland	17	(9)
1958	SFA trial v SFL	1	(1)

Managerial career
- 1965–1967: Port Vale
- 1973: Northwich Victoria
- 1978: Cleveland Cobras
- * Club domestic league appearances and goals

John Knight Mudie (10 April 1930 – 2 March 1992) was a Scottish international footballer who played as a forward. He won 17 caps for his country, helping the Scotland national team to qualify for the 1958 FIFA World Cup.

Starting his career with Blackpool in 1947, he went on to spend the next 14 years with the club, helping them to the FA Cup final in 1951 and 1953, the latter of which ended in victory for the Tangerines. In all, he scored 144 league goals for the club. He then spent 1961 to 1963 at Stoke City, helping them to the Second Division title in 1962–63, also spending a brief time on loan with Canadian club Toronto City. After signing with Port Vale in 1963, he spent 1965 to 1967 as the club's joint-manager, along with his long-time friend and teammate Stanley Matthews. He became a coach after he finished his career with Oswestry Town in 1967. However, he later managed Northwich Victoria in 1973 and then American side Cleveland Cobras for a spell in 1978.

== Biography ==
=== Early years ===
Born in Dundee, Jackie Mudie started his footballing career with local junior sides Lochee Harp and Stobswell Juniors.

=== Blackpool ===
Mudie joined Blackpool in September 1946, signing professional terms in May 1947. He was at the club throughout the 1950s, which are the most successful decade in the club's history.

After three years developing in the reserves, he made his debut on 8 March 1950, against Liverpool, scoring the only goal in a 1–0 win at Anfield. The following season he featured regularly as Blackpool challenged in the league and reached the 1951 FA Cup final. Newcastle United proved too strong at Wembley, however, and two goals from Jackie Milburn took the trophy to the North-East. After the loss, Blackpool signed Ernie Taylor, and Mudie lost his place. Eventually, though, he worked his way back into the team.

In 1952–53, Blackpool bounced back from their disappointment in 1951's FA Cup final when Mudie's last-minute goal against Tottenham Hotspur in that season's semi-final sealed a return to Wembley, this time to face Bolton Wanderers. This match is widely remembered as the "Matthews final", due to the winger helping to turn a 3–1 deficit into a 4–3 win for Blackpool. Although Matthews and hat-trick scorer Stan Mortensen understandably took the limelight, Matthews himself would later acknowledge the importance of the selfless Mudie, noting that his "skill and work for others often made some of us look better than we really were".

In his early career, Mudie was considered an inside forward; however, when Mortensen was transferred to Hull City in August 1955, Mudie became Blackpool's regular centre-forward, despite his diminutive stature. This change of position, combined with his scoring 22 and 38 goals in consecutive seasons, enabled him to achieve international recognition. He made his international debut against Wales in 1956. His hat-trick in a 4–2 win against Spain in 1957 helped Scotland qualify for the following year's World Cup. He was subsequently selected in the squad that travelled to Sweden. Scotland exited after the group stage, effectively ending Mudie's international career with 17 caps and nine goals to his name.

=== Stoke City ===
Stoke City signed Mudie in March 1961 for £8,500, and he scored just five minutes into his debut against Scunthorpe United. He ended the 1960–61 season with three goals from 13 matches as Stoke flirted precariously with relegation. In the summer of 1961 Mudie spent the summer months playing for Canadian side Toronto City along with Stanley Matthews, Danny Blanchflower and Johnny Haynes. After a poor start to the 1961–62 campaign, Stoke's attendances at the Victoria Ground dropped alarmingly below the 10,000 mark. To address the situation manager Tony Waddington brought back Stanley Matthews to the club and it had the desired effect with 35,974 attending the next match against Huddersfield Town. Matthews's return also rekindled his partnership with Mudie which proved vital to winning the Second Division title in 1962–63 as Mudie scored 20 goals, including the opening goal in title decider against Luton Town.

=== Port Vale ===
Mudie moved to Stoke's local rivals Port Vale in November 1963 along with Ron Wilson in a "package" deal of between £12,000 and £15,000.

Initially a regular, the ageing Mudie could not play on hard surfaces due to the risk of muscle jarring, and he lost his first-team place on any surface in August 1964. After Freddie Steele's departure, Mudie became player-manager in February 1965, combining for a third time with boyhood Vale supporter Matthews, who became the Valiants' general-manager a few months later after playing his final First Division match for Stoke against Fulham five days after his 50th birthday. "We can fight our way out of this crisis," Mudie said. "We must do. Although we are down at the bottom of the table, we are not out." His strategy was to spend money to bring in players from the North East, though this would ultimately prove to be an unsuccessful strategy. He resigned in May 1967, citing 'personal reasons'.

=== Later years ===
After his playing retirement, Mudie lived in Stoke-on-Trent, his adopted hometown, setting up a painting and decorating business. He had brief spells coaching at Oswestry Town, Crewe Alexandra (where he was assistant manager), Northwich Victoria, Leek Town and Eastwood Town and also spent one summer in America, as coach of the Cleveland Cobras in 1978. He also spent time in South Africa, as a scout for Johannesburg Rangers.

Mudie died in Stoke in 1992, aged 61, two years after being diagnosed with cancer. Under Valiant 2001, his son, Graham, continued the Port Vale connection by working as a club director.

== Style of play ==
"[He had] superb ball control – he could kill a ball and lay it off with one touch ... his speed of footwork bamboozled even the best of defenders ... his reading of a game proved him a cerebral player. His quick and accurate passing opened and spread defences effortlessly. He was also a busy player who would pop up here and there. Just when a defender thought he had him in his pocket, with a sudden turn and burst of speed, he would disappear."

— Teammate and close friend Stanley Matthews touched on Mudie in his autobiography.

== Career statistics ==
=== Club statistics ===
Appearances and goals by club, season and competition
Club	Season	League			FA Cup		League Cup		Total	
Club	Season	Division	Apps	Goals	Apps	Goals	Apps	Goals	Apps	Goals
Blackpool	1949–50	First Division	8	1	0	0	—		8	1
Blackpool	1950–51	First Division	37	17	8	3	—		45	20
Blackpool	1951–52	First Division	8	4	0	0	—		8	4
Blackpool	1952–53	First Division	20	5	7	1	—		27	6
Blackpool	1953–54	First Division	25	11	1	0	—		26	11
Blackpool	1954–55	First Division	24	7	1	0	—		25	7
Blackpool	1955–56	First Division	42	22	1	0	—		43	22
Blackpool	1956–57	First Division	38	32	4	6	—		42	38
Blackpool	1957–58	First Division	34	18	0	0	—		34	18
Blackpool	1958–59	First Division	40	14	6	0	—		46	14
Blackpool	1959–60	First Division	31	9	2	0	—		33	9
Blackpool	1960–61	First Division	15	4	1	1	1	0	17	5
Blackpool	Total		322	144	31	11	1	0	354	155
Stoke City	1960–61	Second Division	13	3	0	0	0	0	13	3
Stoke City	1961–62	Second Division	32	6	1	1	2	0	35	7
Stoke City	1962–63	Second Division	39	20	0	0	1	0	40	20
Stoke City	1963–64	First Division	4	3	0	0	1	0	5	3
Stoke City	Total		88	32	1	1	4	0	93	33
Port Vale	1963–64	Third Division	18	6	3	1	0	0	21	7
Port Vale	1964–65	Third Division	18	2	1	0	0	0	19	2
Port Vale	1965–66	Fourth Division	13	1	3	1	1	0	17	2
Port Vale	1966–67	Fourth Division	5	0	2	0	0	0	7	0
Port Vale	Total		54	9	9	2	1	0	64	11
Career total			464	185	41	14	6	0	511	199

=== International statistics ===
Scotland national team
Year	Apps	Goals
1956	3	1
1957	8	6
1958	6	2
Total	17	9

=== International goals ===
Scores and results list Scotland's goal tally first.

#	Date	Venue	Opponent	Score	Result	Competition
1	21 November 1956	Hampden Park, Glasgow	Yugoslavia	1–0	2–0	Friendly
2	8 May 1957	Hampden Park, Glasgow	Spain	1–0	4–2	WCQG9
3	8 May 1957	Hampden Park, Glasgow	Spain	3–2	4–2	WCQG9
4	8 May 1957	Hampden Park, Glasgow	Spain	4–2	4–2	WCQG9
5	19 May 1957	St. Jakob-Park, Basel	Switzerland	1–1	2–1	WCQG9
6	22 May 1957	Neckarstadion, Stuttgart	West Germany	2–0	3–1	Friendly
7	6 November 1957	Hampden Park, Glasgow	Switzerland	2–1	3–2	WCQG9
8	7 May 1958	Hampden Park, Glasgow	Hungary	1–0	1–1	Friendly
9	11 June 1958	Idrottsparken, Norrköping	Paraguay	1–1	2–3	WCG2

=== Managerial statistics ===
Managerial record by team and tenure
Team	From	To	Record				
Team	From	To	P	W	D	L	Win %
Port Vale	14 March 1965	31 May 1967	114	37	30	47	32.5

== Honours ==
Blackpool

- FA Cup: 1952–53; runner-up: 1950–51
- Lancashire Senior Cup: 1953–54

Stoke City

- Football League Second Division: 1962–63

== See also ==
- List of Scotland national football team hat-tricks

== Bibliography ==
- Bremner, Billy; Bale, Bernard (1997). Billy Bremner's Scottish Football Heroes (Hardback). Breedon Books. ISBN 1-85983-077-3.
