= 1949 FA Cup final =

1949 FA Cup Final
- Event: 1948–49 FA Cup
Leicester City	Wolverhampton Wanderers
1	3
- Date: 30 April 1949
- Venue: Wembley Stadium, London
- Referee: Reg Mortimer (Huddersfield)
- Attendance: 98,920

The 1949 FA Cup final was the 68th final of the FA Cup. It took place on 30 April 1949 at Wembley Stadium and was contested between Wolverhampton Wanderers and Leicester City. Wolves had finished sixth in the First Division that season and had several England internationals among their ranks, while Leicester had narrowly avoided relegation from the Second Division and were making their first Wembley appearance.

Wolves won the match 3–1, thus winning the FA Cup for the third time. Jesse Pye (2) and Sammy Smyth scored Wolves' goals, with Mal Griffiths replying for Leicester. Captain Billy Wright was presented with the cup by Princess Elizabeth.

== Road to Wembley ==
=== Leicester City ===
3rd Round	Leicester City	1–1	Birmingham City
3rd Round (Replay)	Birmingham City	1–1	Leicester City
3rd Round (2nd Replay)	Leicester City	2–1	Birmingham City
4th Round	Leicester City	2–0	Preston North End
5th Round	Luton Town	5–5	Leicester City
5th Round (Replay)	Leicester City	5–3	Luton Town
6th Round	Brentford	0–2	Leicester City
Semi-final	Portsmouth	1–3	Leicester City
	(at Highbury)		

=== Wolverhampton Wanderers ===
3rd Round	Wolverhampton Wanderers	6–0	Chesterfield
4th Round	Sheffield United	0–3	Wolverhampton Wanderers
5th Round	Wolverhampton Wanderers	3–1	Liverpool
6th Round	Wolverhampton Wanderers	1–0	West Bromwich Albion
Semi-final	Wolverhampton Wanderers	1–1	Manchester United
	(at Hillsborough)		
Semi-final (Replay)	Manchester United	0–1	Wolverhampton Wanderers
	(at Goodison Park)		

== Match summary ==
Wolves started determinedly and took a 13th-minute lead when Jesse Pye, who had been preferred to Dennis Wilshaw, stooped to head in an inch-perfect Hancocks cross. Leicester kept Wolves at bay until almost half-time, when Pye collected the ball in the penalty area with his back to goal, after the Foxes had struggled to clear a corner, and turned to slam it home for his second.

Leicester brought the game to life immediately after the interval courtesy of Mal Griffiths, who flicked the ball home after Williams parried Chisholm's initial effort. Within minutes, they believed they were level only for a narrow offside decision to rule out Chisholm's finish. Sammy Smyth quickly turned the game around when he picked up the ball in the centre circle and drove through the Leicester defence before hitting the ball low into the far corner to make it 3–1 and clinch the cup for Molineux men for the third time in their history. It was the first of five major trophies that they would win under the management of Stan Cullis.

Leicester were without two of their key players for the game, both of them ruled out by injury. Goalkeeper Ian McGraw was unable to play due to a broken finger, while Don Revie had suffered a nose injury.

== Match details ==
30 April 1949
15:00 BST

Leicester City	1–3	Wolverhampton Wanderers
Griffiths 47'	Report	Pye 13', 42'; Smyth 64'

Wembley Stadium, London
Attendance: 98,920
Referee: R. A. Mortimer (Huddersfield)

Leicester City	Wolverhampton Wanderers

1	(England) Gordon Bradley
2	(England) Ted Jelly
3	(Scotland) Sandy Scott
4	(England) Walter Harrison
5	(England) Norman Plummer (c)
6	(England) Johnny King
7	(Wales) Mal Griffiths
8	(England) Jack Lee
9	(England) Jimmy Harrison
10	(Scotland) Ken Chisholm
11	(Scotland) Charlie Adam
Manager:
(Scotland) Johnny Duncan

1	(England) Bert Williams
2	(England) Roy Pritchard
3	(United States) Terry Springthorpe
4	(England) Billy Crook
5	(England) Bill Shorthouse
6	(England) Billy Wright (c)
7	(England) Johnny Hancocks
8	(Northern Ireland) Sammy Smyth
9	(England) Jesse Pye
10	(Scotland) Jimmy Dunn
11	(England) Jimmy Mullen
Manager:
(England) Stan Cullis
