= Johnny King (footballer, born 1926) =

English footballer

John King (5 November 1926 – 11 January 2010) was an English footballer who played as a wing half for Leicester City in the 1940s and 1950s.

He was born in Great Gidding and first played for Peterborough United before joining Leicester in September 1943. He made 197 Football League appearances and played for the Foxes in the 1949 FA Cup Final, and remained with the club until July 1955.

== Honours ==
Leicester City

- FA Cup runner-up: 1948–49
