= Jimmy Dunn (footballer, born 1923) =

Scottish footballer

Personal information
- Date of birth: 25 November 1923
- Place of birth: Edinburgh, Scotland
- Date of death: 31 December 2014 (aged 91)
- Place of death: Bilston, England
- Position: Inside forward

Youth career
- ?–1942: Maghull Athletic

Senior career*
Years	Team	Apps	(Gls)
1942–1952	Wolverhampton Wanderers	123	(33)
1952–1955	Derby County	57	(21)
1955–?	Worcester City	?	(?)
- * Club domestic league appearances and goals

James Dunn (25 November 1923 – 31 December 2014) was a Scottish footballer, who spent the majority of his league career with Wolverhampton Wanderers. He was the son of a Scottish international footballer, also named Jimmy Dunn.

== Career ==
Born in Edinburgh but raised in Liverpool after his father transferred from Hibernian to Everton, Dunn junior joined Wolves as an apprentice in 1941, signing professionally the following year. The start of his official league career was delayed due to World War II, during which Dunn worked as a fireman. He made 100 unofficial wartime appearances for Wolves, but was mostly in the reserves when league football resumed in the 1946/47 season. He made just three first team appearances, but one of those was a league championship decider that Wolves lost 2–1 to Liverpool.

He broke through in the following campaign and was also a regular player in the next season, which saw him win the 1949 FA Cup. A back injury sidelined him for most of the 1949/50 season, but he recovered to feature strongly during the next two years. He eventually left Molineux to join Derby County in 1953 for £15,000.

After suffering relegation to the third tier with Derby in 1955, he moved into non-league football with Worcester City, and later also played for Runcorn.

Upon retiring from the game, he ran a pub in Penn, West Midlands before qualifying as a physiotherapist. In this role, he became a trainer at West Bromwich Albion in 1963 and was on the bench at the 1967 League Cup and 1968 FA Cup finals. After leaving the club he joined the staff at Edgbaston Health Clinic, owned by Bernard Thomas, to run the gym and swimming pool and also worked as a 'rep' in Dudley.

On 31 December 2014 Dunn died at the age of 91.

== Honours ==
Wolverhampton Wanderers

- FA Cup: 1948–49
