= Ian McGraw =

Scottish footballer

Personal information
- Full name: John McGraw
- Date of birth: 30 August 1926
- Place of birth: Glasgow, Scotland
- Date of death: 2014 (aged 87–88)
- Place of death: Leicester, England
- Position: Goalkeeper

Youth career
- Rutherglen Glencairn

Senior career*
Years	Team	Apps	(Gls)
1948	Arbroath		
1948–1951	Leicester City	13	(0)
- Corby Town
- * Club domestic league appearances and goals

Ian McGraw (30 August 1926 – October 2014) was a Scottish footballer, who played as a goalkeeper for Arbroath and Leicester City. He was part of the Leicester squad that reached the 1949 FA Cup Final, but McGraw missed the game due to injury.
