= Jelly (name) =

Jelly is a given name, surname, and nickname. It may refer to the following people:

== Surname ==
- David Jelly (1847–1911), Canadian politician
- Ted Jelly (1921–2000), English former footballer
- William Jelly (1835–1900), Canadian politician

== Nickname ==
- Floyd Jelly Gardner (1895–1977), American baseball player in the Negro leagues
- Norman Jackson (baseball) (1909–1980), American baseball player in the Negro leagues
- Frank Nash (1887–1933), American bank robber
- Olan Jelly Taylor (1910–1976), American baseball player in the Negro leagues

== See also ==
- Jelly Roll Morton (1890–1941), American ragtime and early jazz pianist, bandleader and composer
- Jelly (disambiguation)
- Jelle, a Dutch given name
