= Jesse Pye =

English footballer

Personal information
- Date of birth: 22 December 1919
- Place of birth: Treeton, England
- Date of death: 19 February 1984 (aged 64)
- Place of death: Blackpool, England
- Position: Forward

Youth career
- Catcliffe
- Treeton

Senior career*
Years	Team	Apps	(Gls)
1938–1945	Sheffield United	0	(0)
1945–1946	Notts County	-	(-)
1946–1952	Wolverhampton Wanderers	188	(90)
1952–1954	Luton Town	61	(32)
1954–1957	Derby County	61	(24)
1957–1967	Wisbech Town	242	(138)
Total		553	(284)

International career
1949	England	1	(0)

Managerial career
- 1960–1967: Wisbech Town (player/manager)
- * Club domestic league appearances and goals

Jesse Pye (22 December 1919 – 19 February 1984) was an English footballer. He played in the Football League for Wolverhampton Wanderers, Luton Town and Derby County and scored twice in the 1949 FA Cup final for the former.

== Club career ==
Pye's first professional club was Sheffield United whom he joined in 1938. However, the outbreak of World War II and suspension of league football halted his hopes of a league career with the Blades. After war service in North Africa and in Italy, he signed to Notts County in 1945 and played in the transitional league season of 1945–46. At the end of the season, as the Football League prepared to relaunch, he joined First Division Wolverhampton Wanderers for £10,000.

The forward made an instant impact at Molineux, scoring a hattrick on his league debut on 31 August 1946 as Wolves thrashed Arsenal 6–1, and finished the campaign with 21 goals. He continued with his goalscoring exploits the following season, being joint top goalscorer for the club. The next year brought Pye his first taste of silverware as he scored twice in the 1949 FA Cup final, to help Wolves beat Leicester City 3–1.

He suffered a string of injuries during 1950–51, which sidelined him for half the league games, but he recovered to finish as top goalscorer once again the next season. Despite this feat, he was allowed to leave the club at the end of the season, joining Luton Town for £5,000. In total, he played 209 times for Wolves, scoring 95 goals.

Pye settled well at the Second Division club and netted 24 goals in his first season in 1952–53 as the club finished 3rd, just missing promotion. He added a further 37 goals before stunning the club by moving to fellow second-tier side Derby County in October 1954.

Despite Pye's firepower, Derby suffered the drop to the Third Division (North). He played one more season at the Baseball Ground, as the team finished 2nd, narrowly missing out on an immediate return to the Second Division.

== International career ==
His prowess in front of goal with Wolves won him a call-up to the England team. He had already played in a Victory International on 19 January 1946, scoring in a 2–0 win over Belgium, but eventually made his full debut on 21 September 1949 in a 2–0 defeat against Ireland at Goodison Park. This game, England's first defeat on home soil to a non-Home Nation opponent, would prove to be his only cap.

== Later life ==
He left the club in 1957 and became a landlord in Wisbech, also opening several sweet shops. He was signed up to the local non-league football club Wisbech Town, playing in the Midland League. Pye scored the goal that beat Colchester United to put Wisbech Town into the second round proper of the FA Cup for the first time in their history in November 1957. He became player/manager of the club in March 1960 and held the post until resigning in April 1967. The following year he sold his shops in the town and moved to Blackpool to become a hotelier.

He died in Blackpool on 19 February 1984 aged 64.

== Honours ==
Wolverhampton Wanderers

- FA Cup: 1948–49
- FA Charity Shield: 1949 (shared)
