= Sandy Scott (disambiguation) =

Sandy Scott (1934–2010) was a Canadian wrestler.

Sandy Scott may also refer to:

- Sandy Scott, two Scottish wrestlers, see Sandy Scott#Legacy
- Sandy Scott (golfer) (born 1998), Scottish professional golfer
- Sandy Scott (footballer) (1922–1995), Scottish footballer
- Sandy Scott (singer) (born 1941), Australian singer
