= Gordon Bradley (disambiguation) =

Gordon Bradley (1933–2008) was an English-American football (soccer) player and coach.

Gordon Bradley may also refer to:

- Gordon R. Bradley (1921–2011), member of the Wisconsin State Assembly
- Gordon Bradley (footballer, born 1925) (1925–2006), English footballer
