= Gordon Bradley (footballer, born 1925) =

English footballer

Personal information
- Date of birth: 20 May 1925
- Place of birth: Scunthorpe, England
- Date of death: 2006 (aged 80–81)
- Position: Goalkeeper

Senior career*
Years	Team	Apps	(Gls)
- Scunthorpe United
1946–1950	Leicester City	69	(0)
1950–1958	Notts County	192	(1)
- Cambridge City
Total		261	(1)
- * Club domestic league appearances and goals

Gordon Bradley (20 May 1925 – 2006) was an English footballer who played in the Football League for Leicester City and Notts County.

== Honours ==
Leicester City

- FA Cup runner-up: 1948–49
