= Jelly =

Jelly may refer to:

== Food ==
- Jelly (fruit preserves), a clear or translucent fruit spread or preserve
- Jelly (dessert), a clear or translucent dessert

== Entertainment ==
- Jelly's Last Jam, an American musical based on the early days of Jazz
- The Jellys, an English punk/pop band
- "Jelly" (song), a 2006 song by Japanese electronic duo Capsule
- Mr. Jelly, title character of the 1976 book Mr. Jelly, in the Mr. Men children's book series
- The Jellies!, an American adult animated television series
- Jelly (YouTuber), a Dutch YouTuber
- Shadowmoor, a Magic: the Gathering expansion set, codenamed "Jelly" in development
- Nickname of Sergeant Jelal, a character in the 1959 novel Starship Troopers by Robert A. Heinlein

== Other uses ==
- Jelly (name), a list of people with the nickname or surname
- Gelignite, also known as blasting jelly or simply jelly
- Temazepam, a powerful hypnotic drug, street name "jellies"
- Jellyfish, also known as jellies
- Apache Jelly, a Java- and XML-based scripting and processing engine for turning XML into executable code
- Petroleum jelly
- Jelly (app), an app, and the company behind it
- Jelly shoes or jellies, PVC plastic shoes

== See also ==
- Jelli, a California-based advertising technology firm
- Gelly, a name, surname and nickname
- Jeli District, a local government district and state parliamentary constituency in Malaysia
- Jeli (federal constituency), a federal parliamentary constituency in Malaysia
- Jeli a storyteller, singer, or musician of oral tradition in West Africa, also known as a griot
