= Ken Chisholm =

Scottish footballer and manager

Personal information
- Full name: Kenneth McTaggart Chisholm
- Date of birth: 12 April 1925
- Place of birth: Glasgow, Scotland
- Date of death: 30 April 1990 (aged 65)
- Place of death: Chester-le-Street, England
- Height: 5 ft 11 in (1.80 m)
- Position: Forward

Senior career*
Years	Team	Apps	(Gls)
1941-1942	Pollok	12	(0)
1942–1946	Queen's Park		
1946–1948	Partick Thistle	34	(13)
1948–1949	Leeds United	40	(17)
1949–1950	Leicester City	42	(17)
1950–1952	Coventry City	68	(34)
1952–1953	Cardiff City	63	(33)
1953–1956	Sunderland	78	(33)
1956–1958	Workington	39	(15)

Managerial career
- 1958: Glentoran
- * Club domestic league appearances and goals

Kenneth McTaggart Chisholm (12 April 1925 – 30 April 1990) was a Scottish footballer who played for a number of teams in The Football League and the Scottish Football League as a forward.

== Club career ==
Chisholm, a former RAF fighter pilot, began his footballing career in the Junior game at Pollok as a 16 year old during the 1941/42 season. He made his debut in a Junior Cup defeat to Wishaw before going on to sign for Queen's Park, joining the club in 1942. During his time with the club, he represented Scotland in a wartime victory international, playing in a 3–2 victory over Ireland. During wartime, he also featured for several English clubs, including Manchester City and Chelsea as a guest player, before moving to Partick Thistle in 1946 where he made 34 appearances and scored 13 goals. In 1948, he joined Leeds United for a fee of £6,000 after the club failed in their attempt to sign Jimmy Mason from Third Lanark. Between 1948 and 1949 he scored 17 goals in 40 appearances for the Whites but fell out with manager Frank Buckley. He instead joined Leicester City in 1949, with Ray Iggleden moving to Elland Road in exchange, and went on to make 42 appearances scoring 17 goals.

Chisholm made the switch to Midlands rivals Coventry City in 1950, he made 68 appearances and scored 34 goals for the club before transferring to Cardiff City in March 1952. He made his debut in a 6-1 defeat against Sheffield United but went on to score 8 times in the last 11 games of the season to help secure promotion for the club. He finished as top scorer in his first season and shared top league scorer with Wilf Grant the following season, netting his only hattrick for the club in October 1953 in a 5–0 victory over Charlton Athletic. Chisholm left the Cardiff to sign for Sunderland and made his debut for them on 1 January 1954 against Aston Villa in a 2–0 win at Roker Park where he also scored a goal. During his time at the club he made 78 league appearances scoring 33 goals. He finished his career with Workington in 1956, before a short spell at Glentoran just before his retirement.

== Honours ==
Leicester City

- FA Cup runner-up: 1948–49
