= Topps Tiles =

Tile retailer in the United Kingdom

Topps Tiles plc
- Type: Public
- Traded as: LSE: TPT
- Industry: Retail
- Founded: 1963
- Founder: Alan Brindle; Ted Derbyshire
- Headquarters: Enderby, Leicestershire, United Kingdom
- Area served: United Kingdom
- Key people: Paul Forman (Chairman); Alex Jensen (CEO)
- Products: Tiles
- Revenue: ▲£295.8 million (2025)
- Operating income: ▲£15.3 million (2025)
- Net income: ▲£6.0 million (2025)
- Website: www.toppsgroup.com

Topps Tiles plc is a British national tile retailer based in Enderby, Leicestershire. The company was founded by Alan Brindle and Ted Derbyshire in 1963 and as of April 2026, employs 1,850 people. Topps Tiles is listed on the London Stock Exchange. The company operates 319 stores in the UK, as of April 2025.

== History ==
Topps Tiles was founded in 1963 by Alan Brindle and Edward (Ted) Derbyshire, who opened the company’s first store in Sale, Cheshire. Derbyshire had a varied career before establishing the business, having served in the RAF, worked as a salesman and dairy labourer, and been employed in the furniture industry. He identified a niche for patterned tiles that catered to the growing DIY and home improvement market, which inspired him to start Topps Tiles. Over the years, Derbyshire went on to establish 30 other businesses before retiring and selling Topps Tiles to Stuart Williams and Barry Bester in 1993.

Following its beginnings in 1963, the company continued to grow, with stores opening across the North West and the Midlands. During this time, Tile Kingdom was rapidly expanding in the South of England and, in 1990, Tile Kingdom merged with Topps Tiles, increasing the total number of Topps Tiles stores to 40 across the UK. By 1999, Topps Tiles was trading from 100 locations and was now trading as a PLC.

With a network of stores across the UK, Topps Tiles launched its e-commerce store in 2008 to bring its products to an even wider audience. In 2020, the retailer set an ambitious goal: to secure £1 in every £5 spent on tiles in the UK within five years.

In April 2026, the company announced the closure of 23 stores, with eight already close and the remainder to close over the next six months.

== Key people ==
In 2007, Matthew Williams was appointed CEO of Topps Tiles. He served as CEO for 12 years and spent a total of 20 years with the company before stepping down in 2019. In November 2019, the company’s Chief Financial Officer (CFO), Rob Parker, succeeded Williams as CEO.

Darren Shapland served as the tile retailer’s chairman from 2014 to 2023. During his tenure, he faced a shareholder vote after investor MS Galleon called for his removal, describing it as a “necessary step” for the business to return to growth. In October 2023, Paul Forman succeeded Shapland as the new chairman, taking over the role.

In June 2025, the company announced Alex Jensen, former chief executive of National Express UK, Ireland and Germany, would replace Rob Barker as CEO following his retirement at the end of the year.

== Strategic partnerships ==
=== Sponsorships ===
Between 2007 and 2009, Topps Tiles sponsored Leicester City Football Club's shirts. Since the 2020/21 season, Topps Tiles has been the main shirt sponsor and official partner of Leicester Tigers Rugby Club, with this agreement being extended until 2025. Outside of sports, in 2010, Topps Tiles sponsored the ITV Weather and, in 2013, sponsored Daybreak's national weather forecast programme.

=== Partnerships ===
In 2014, property expert Phil Spencer became Topps Tiles' first brand ambassador and, in 2017, property developer and TV presenter Sarah Beeny was announced as the company’s second brand ambassador.

Over the years, Topps Tiles has supported various charities. The company’s first charity partnership was with Asthma UK, followed by a partnership with Help for Heroes in 2008. From 2015 to 2022, the tile retailer partnered with Macmillan Cancer Support and, since 2022, Topps Tiles has been working with Alzheimer’s Society.

== Other business activities ==
In 2012, just before celebrating its 50th anniversary, the company unveiled its flagship ‘lab’ store in Milton Keynes.

Continuing its focus on innovative customer experiences, Topps Tiles launched a series of boutique stores in London in 2014. The flagship boutique store in Walton-on-Thames had running costs that were three-quarters the size of a traditional Topps store and offered half of a traditional store’s Stock Keeping Units. In early 2023, Topps Tiles opened its first eco-mindful store in Guildford.

== Controversies ==
During the 2011 recession, shares in Topps Tiles dropped by nearly 30%, while half-year profits fell by 50% compared to the same period the previous year. Commentators attributed this decline, in part, to the growing competition from DIY retailers, which had been expanding their product offerings to include tiles, posing an increasing threat to Topps Tiles' market share.

Following its acquisition of CTD Tiles, Topps Tiles was issued an Initial Enforcement Order (IEO) by the UK Competition and Markets Authority (CMA) in October 2024. The IEO prevented Topps Tiles from fully integrating CTD Tiles into its operations until the CMA had completed a review to ensure that the transaction complies with competition regulations.
