= Gelly =

Gelly is a name, surname and a nickname. It may refer to the following people:

== Name ==
- Gelly Meyrick (1556?–1601), Welsh noble

== Surname ==
- Alejandro Agustín Lanusse Gelly (1918-1996), President of Argentina
- Dave Gelly (1938–), British jazz critic
- Juan Andrés Gelly (1790-1856), Paraguayan diplomat
- Juan Andrés Gelly y Obes (1815–1904), Argentine general

== Nickname ==
- Angeliki Skarlatou (1976–), Greek windsurfer

== See also ==
- Jelly
