= Ted Jelly =

English footballer

Personal information
- Full name: Horace Edward Jelly
- Date of birth: 28 August 1921
- Place of birth: Leicester, England
- Date of death: 16 January 2000 (aged 78)
- Place of death: Leicester, England
- Position: Right back

Senior career*
Years	Team	Apps	(Gls)
–1944	Belgrave United		
1944–1951	Leicester City	56	(1)
1952–1954	Plymouth Argyle	11	(0)
Total		67	(1)
- * Club domestic league appearances and goals

Horace Edward Jelly (28 August 1921 – 16 January 2000) was an English professional footballer who played in the Football League for Leicester City and Plymouth Argyle as a right back.

== Personal life ==
Jelly served in the Royal Navy during the Second World War. He saw action at the Battle of Crete and was stationed in Ceylon. Following his retirement as a professional footballer, Jelly ran an electrical shop and a Saab dealership in Leicester. In the 1990s, he had a part-time role leading guided tours around Filbert Street.

== Career statistics ==
Appearances and goals by club, season and competition
Club	Season	League			FA Cup		Total	
Club	Season	Division	Apps	Goals	Apps	Goals	Apps	Goals
Leicester City	1946–47	Second Division	2	0	0	0	2	0
Leicester City	1947–48	Second Division	3	0	0	0	3	0
Leicester City	1948–49	Second Division	14	0	8	0	22	0
Leicester City	1949–50	Second Division	31	1	1	0	32	1
Leicester City	1950–51	Second Division	6	0	0	0	6	0
Leicester City	Total		56	1	9	0	65	1
Plymouth Argyle	1952–53	Second Division	10	0	2	0	12	0
Plymouth Argyle	1953–54	Second Division	1	0	0	0	1	0
Plymouth Argyle	Total		11	0	2	0	13	0
Career total			67	1	11	0	78	1

== Honours ==
Leicester City

- FA Cup runner-up: 1948–49
