= Jack Lee (footballer, born 1920) =

English footballer

Personal information
- Full name: John Lee
- Date of birth: 4 November 1920
- Place of birth: Sileby, England
- Date of death: 12 January 1995 (aged 74)
- Place of death: Rugby, England
- Position: Forward

Senior career*
Years	Team	Apps	(Gls)
–1940	Quorn Methodists		
1940–1950	Leicester City	123	(74)
1950–1954	Derby County	93	(54)
1954–1955	Coventry City	15	(8)
Total		231	(136)

International career
1950	England	1	(1)
- * Club domestic league appearances and goals

John Lee (4 November 1920 – 12 January 1995) was an English footballer who played as a forward. He scored 136 goals from 231 appearances in the Football League playing for Leicester City, Derby County and Coventry City, and was capped once by England. Lee was born in Sileby, Leicestershire and died in Rugby, Warwickshire, and also played first-class cricket for Leicestershire.

Lee began his professional career with Leicester City, moving to Derby County in 1950. He won his only England cap that same year when he played and scored in their 4–1 win over Northern Ireland at Windsor Park. He finished his career in 1955 at Coventry City.

At cricket, Lee was a right-handed batsman and a right-arm medium-pace bowler. He made a single first-class appearance for Leicestershire, in 1947, against Glamorgan. Lee scored 3 runs in the first innings and a duck in the second, and took 1/13 from four overs.

== Honours ==
Leicester City

- FA Cup runner-up: 1948–49
