= Sandy Scott (footballer) =

Scottish footballer (1922–1995)

Personal information
- Full name: Alexander MacNaughton Scott
- Date of birth: 17 November 1922
- Place of birth: Kingsbarns, Scotland
- Date of death: 27 August 1995 (aged 72)
- Place of death: Glenrothes, Scotland
- Position: Defender

Senior career*
Years	Team	Apps	(Gls)
- Lochgelly Albert
1947–1950	Leicester City	31	(1)
1951–1953	Carlisle United	200	(4)
- South Shields
Total		231	(5)
- * Club domestic league appearances and goals

Alexander MacNaughton Scott (17 November 1922 – 27 August 1995) was a Scottish footballer who played in the Football League for Carlisle United and Leicester City.

== Honours ==
Leicester City

- FA Cup runner-up: 1948–49
