= Mal Griffiths =

Welsh footballer

Personal information
- Full name: William Maldwyn Griffiths
- Date of birth: 8 March 1919
- Place of birth: Merthyr Tydfil, Wales
- Date of death: 5 April 1969 (aged 50)
- Place of death: Wigston Magna, England
- Position: Outside right

Senior career*
Years	Team	Apps	(Gls)
1935–1938	Arsenal	9	(5)
1936–1937	→ Margate (loan)		
1938–1956	Leicester City	373	(66)
1956–1957	Burton Albion		

International career
1947–1954	Wales	11	(2)
- * Club domestic league appearances and goals

William Maldwyn "Mal" Griffiths (8 March 1919 – 5 April 1969) was a Welsh footballer who played as an outside right for Leicester City and Wales.

Born in Merthyr Tydfil, Griffiths started out in local football before signing for Arsenal. After a spell at Arsenal's nursery club Margate he returned to the senior team and played nine league games (scoring five goals) in 1937–38 as Arsenal won the old First Division.

He moved to Leicester City for the 1938–39 season, and went on to play 373 League games for the Foxes over the next 18 years. He also made 36 FA Cup appearances for Leicester, and along with wartime games, his overall total appearances numbered 420, with 79 goals scored. He finished his career with Burton Albion.

Griffiths also won eleven caps for Wales, scoring two goals.

== Honours ==
Leicester City

- FA Cup runner-up: 1948–49
