= 1948–49 FA Cup =

Tournament details
- Country: England; Wales

Final positions
- Champions: Wolverhampton Wanderers (3rd title)
- Runners-up: Leicester City

The 1948–49 FA Cup was the 68th staging of the world's oldest football cup competition, the Football Association Challenge Cup, commonly known as the FA Cup. Wolverhampton Wanderers won the competition for the third time, beating Leicester City 3–1 in the final at Wembley.

Matches were scheduled to be played at the stadium of the team named first on the date specified for each round, which was always a Saturday. Some matches, however, might be rescheduled for other days if there were clashes with games for other competitions or the weather was inclement. If scores were level after 90 minutes had been played, a replay would take place at the stadium of the second-named team later the same week. If the replayed match was drawn further replays would be held until a winner was determined. If scores were level after 90 minutes had been played in a replay, a 30-minute period of extra time would be played.

== Calendar ==
Round	Date
Extra preliminary round	Saturday 4 September 1948
Preliminary round	Saturday 18 September 1948
First qualifying round	Saturday 2 October 1948
Second qualifying round	Saturday 16 October 1948
Third qualifying round	Saturday 30 October 1948
Fourth qualifying round	Saturday 13 November 1948
First round proper	Saturday 27 November 1948
Second round	Saturday 11 December 1948
Third round	Saturday 8 January 1949
Fourth round	Saturday 29 January 1949
Fifth round	Saturday 13 February 1949
Sixth round	Saturday 26 February 1949
Semifinals	Saturday 26 March 1949
Final	Saturday 30 April 1949

== Qualifying rounds ==
Most participating clubs that were not members of the Football League competed in the qualifying rounds to secure one of 25 places available in the first round.

The 25 winners from the fourth qualifying round were Billingham Synthonia, Scarborough, Horden Colliery Welfare, Workington, Netherfield, Rhyl, Witton Albion, Runcorn, Hereford United, Wellington Town, Scunthorpe & Lindsey United, Gainsborough Trinity, Peterborough United, Kidderminster Harriers, Cambridge Town, Walthamstow Avenue, Romford, Barnet, Tooting & Mitcham United, Dartford, Chelmsford City, Dulwich Hamlet, Weymouth, Gloucester City and Yeovil Town.

Those appearing in the competition proper for the first time were Billingham Synthonia, Witton Albion, Tooting & Mitcham United and Gloucester City, while Hereford United had not reached this stage since 1932–33 and Weymouth had not done so since 1926-27.

Weymouth was the most successful club from this season's extra preliminary round, progressing to the second round proper after defeating Bournemouth, Andover, Newport (IOW), Longfleet St Mary's, Poole Town, Trowbridge Town and Chelmsford City. Horden Colliery Welfare, Romford and Gloucester City also progressed from the extra preliminary round to the first round proper.

== First round proper ==
At this stage 41 clubs from the Football League Third Division North and South joined the 25 non-league clubs that came through the qualifying rounds. Bournemouth & Boscombe Athletic, Rotherham United and Swindon Town were given byes to the third round. To make the number of matches up, non-league sides Leytonstone and Colchester United were given byes to this round, with Leytonstone being the champions from the previous season's FA Amateur Cup and Colchester being the best-performed non-league club from the previous season's FA Cup.

34 matches were scheduled to be played on Saturday, 27 November 1948, with eight of these postponed until the following Saturday. Two were drawn and went to replays.

Tie no	Home team	Score	Away team	Date
1	Dartford	2–3	Leyton Orient	27 November 1948
2	Barnet	2–6	Exeter City	4 December 1948
3	Rochdale	1–1	Barrow	27 November 1948
Replay	Barrow	2–0	Rochdale	4 December 1948
4	Weymouth	2–1	Chelmsford City	27 November 1948
5	Yeovil Town	4–0	Romford	27 November 1948
6	Walsall	2–1	Bristol Rovers	27 November 1948
7	Notts County	2–1	Port Vale	27 November 1948
8	Crewe Alexandra	5–0	Billingham Synthonia	27 November 1948
9	Gainsborough Trinity	1–0	Witton Albion	27 November 1948
10	Wrexham	0–3	Oldham Athletic	27 November 1948
11	Ipswich Town	0–3	Aldershot	4 December 1948
12	Tranmere Rovers	1–3	Darlington	27 November 1948
13	Kidderminster Harriers	0–3	Hereford United	27 November 1948
14	Leytonstone	2–1	Watford	4 December 1948
15	Northampton Town	2–1	Dulwich Hamlet	27 November 1948
16	Rhyl	0–2	Scarborough	4 December 1948
17	Norwich City	1–0	Wellington Town	27 November 1948
18	Bradford City	4–3	Doncaster Rovers	4 December 1948
19	Millwall	1–0	Tooting & Mitcham United	27 November 1948
20	Hull City	3–1	Accrington Stanley	27 November 1948
21	Crystal Palace	0–1	Bristol City	27 November 1948
22	Southend United	1–2	Swansea Town	4 December 1948
23	Hartlepools United	1–3	Chester	27 November 1948
24	Mansfield Town	4–0	Gloucester City	27 November 1948
25	Halifax Town	0–0	Scunthorpe United	4 December 1948
Replay	Scunthorpe United	1–0	Halifax Town	6 December 1948
26	Newport County	3–1	Brighton & Hove Albion	27 November 1948
27	Southport	2–1	Horden CW	27 November 1948
28	New Brighton	1–0	Carlisle United	27 November 1948
29	Workington	0–3	Stockport County	27 November 1948
30	Walthamstow Avenue	3–2	Cambridge Town	27 November 1948
31	York City	2–1	Runcorn	27 November 1948
32	Gateshead	3–0	Netherfield (Kendal)	27 November 1948
33	Peterborough United	0–1	Torquay United	27 November 1948
34	Colchester United	2–4	Reading	4 December 1948

== Second round proper ==
The matches were played on Saturday, 11 December 1948. Four matches were drawn, with replays taking place the following Saturday.

Tie no	Home team	Score	Away team	Date
1	Darlington	1–0	Leyton Orient	11 December 1948
2	Bristol City	3–1	Swansea Town	11 December 1948
3	Weymouth	0–4	Yeovil Town	11 December 1948
4	Walsall	4–3	Gainsborough Trinity	11 December 1948
5	Notts County	3–2	Barrow	11 December 1948
6	Crewe Alexandra	3–2	Millwall	11 December 1948
7	Leytonstone	3–4	Newport County	11 December 1948
8	Bradford City	0–0	New Brighton	11 December 1948
Replay	New Brighton	1–0	Bradford City	18 December 1948
9	Hull City	0–0	Reading	11 December 1948
Replay	Reading	1–2	Hull City	18 December 1948
10	Exeter City	2–1	Hereford United	11 December 1948
11	Scunthorpe United	0–1	Stockport County	11 December 1948
12	Mansfield Town	2–1	Northampton Town	11 December 1948
13	Southport	2–2	York City	11 December 1948
Replay	York City	0–2	Southport	18 December 1948
14	Torquay United	3–1	Norwich City	11 December 1948
15	Walthamstow Avenue	2–2	Oldham Athletic	11 December 1948
Replay	Oldham Athletic	3–1	Walthamstow Avenue	18 December 1948
16	Aldershot	1–0	Chester	11 December 1948
17	Gateshead	3–0	Scarborough	11 December 1948

== Third round proper ==
The 44 First and Second Division clubs entered the competition at this stage along with Bournemouth & Boscombe Athletic, Rotherham United and Swindon Town.

The matches were scheduled for Saturday, 8 January 1949. Four matches were drawn and went to replays on the following Saturday, with two of these going to a second replay.

Tie no	Home team	Score	Away team	Date
1	Bristol City	1–3	Chelsea	8 January 1949
2	Burnley	2–1	Charlton Athletic	8 January 1949
3	Preston North End	2–1	Mansfield Town	8 January 1949
4	Yeovil Town	3–1	Bury	8 January 1949
5	Nottingham Forest	2–2	Liverpool	8 January 1949
Replay	Liverpool	4–0	Nottingham Forest	15 January 1949
6	Blackburn Rovers	1–2	Hull City	8 January 1949
7	Aston Villa	1–1	Bolton Wanderers	8 January 1949
Replay	Bolton Wanderers	0–0	Aston Villa	15 January 1949
Replay	Aston Villa	2–1	Bolton Wanderers	17 January 1949
8	Sheffield Wednesday	2–1	Southampton	8 January 1949
9	Grimsby Town	2–1	Exeter City	8 January 1949
10	Wolverhampton Wanderers	6–0	Chesterfield	8 January 1949
11	Crewe Alexandra	0–2	Sunderland	8 January 1949
12	Derby County	4–1	Southport	8 January 1949
13	Lincoln City	0–1	West Bromwich Albion	8 January 1949
14	Luton Town	3–1	West Ham United	8 January 1949
15	Everton	1–0	Manchester City	8 January 1949
16	Swindon Town	1–3	Stoke City	8 January 1949
17	Sheffield United	5–2	New Brighton	8 January 1949
18	Newcastle United	0–2	Bradford Park Avenue	8 January 1949
19	Queens Park Rangers	0–0	Huddersfield Town	8 January 1949
Replay	Huddersfield Town	5–0	Queens Park Rangers	15 January 1949
20	Fulham	0–1	Walsall	8 January 1949
21	Barnsley	0–1	Blackpool	8 January 1949
22	Brentford	3–2	Middlesbrough	8 January 1949
23	Portsmouth	7–0	Stockport County	8 January 1949
24	Manchester United	6–0	Bournemouth & Boscombe Athletic	8 January 1949
25	Plymouth Argyle	0–1	Notts County	8 January 1949
26	Oldham Athletic	2–3	Cardiff City	8 January 1949
27	Arsenal	3–0	Tottenham Hotspur	8 January 1949
28	Leeds United	1–3	Newport County	8 January 1949
29	Torquay United	1–0	Coventry City	8 January 1949
30	Rotherham United	4–2	Darlington	8 January 1949
31	Gateshead	3–1	Aldershot	8 January 1949
32	Birmingham City	1–1	Leicester City	8 January 1949
Replay	Leicester City	1–1	Birmingham City	15 January 1949
Replay	Birmingham City	1–2	Leicester City	17 January 1949

== Fourth round proper ==
The matches were scheduled for Saturday, 29 January 1949. Three games were drawn and went to replays, which were all played on the following Saturday. Manchester United and Bradford Park Avenue went to a second replay on the following Monday, with Manchester United easily winning the tie to go through.

Tie no	Home team	Score	Away team	Date
1	Liverpool	1–0	Notts County	29 January 1949
2	Yeovil Town	2–1	Sunderland	29 January 1949
3	Leicester City	2–0	Preston North End	29 January 1949
4	Aston Villa	1–2	Cardiff City	29 January 1949
5	Grimsby Town	2–3	Hull City	29 January 1949
6	Derby County	1–0	Arsenal	29 January 1949
7	Luton Town	4–0	Walsall	29 January 1949
8	Sheffield United	0–3	Wolverhampton Wanderers	29 January 1949
9	Brentford	1–0	Torquay United	29 January 1949
10	Portsmouth	2–1	Sheffield Wednesday	29 January 1949
11	Manchester United	1–1	Bradford Park Avenue	29 January 1949
Replay	Bradford Park Avenue	1–1	Manchester United	5 February 1949
Replay	Manchester United	5–0	Bradford Park Avenue	7 February 1949
12	Chelsea	2–0	Everton	29 January 1949
13	Newport County	3–3	Huddersfield Town	29 January 1949
Replay	Huddersfield Town	1–3	Newport County	5 February 1949
14	Stoke City	1–1	Blackpool	29 January 1949
Replay	Blackpool	0–1	Stoke City	5 February 1949
15	Rotherham United	0–1	Burnley	29 January 1949
16	Gateshead	1–3	West Bromwich Albion	29 January 1949

== Fifth round proper ==
The matches were scheduled for Saturday, 12 February 1949. There was one replay, taking place the following Saturday. Yeovil Town was the last non-league club left in the competition, emulating the achievement of Colchester United from the previous season in reaching this stage.

Tie no	Home team	Score	Away team	Date
1	Wolverhampton Wanderers	3–1	Liverpool	12 February 1949
2	West Bromwich Albion	3–0	Chelsea	12 February 1949
3	Derby County	2–1	Cardiff City	12 February 1949
4	Luton Town	5–5	Leicester City	12 February 1949
Replay	Leicester City	5–3	Luton Town	19 February 1949
5	Brentford	4–2	Burnley	12 February 1949
6	Portsmouth	3–2	Newport County	12 February 1949
7	Manchester United	8–0	Yeovil Town	12 February 1949
8	Stoke City	0–2	Hull City	12 February 1949

== Sixth round proper ==
The draw for the sixth round was made on Monday, 14 February 1949. All matches were played on Saturday, 26 February 1949.

26 February 1949
15:00 GMT

Brentford	0–2	Leicester City
		Lee; Griffiths 75'

Griffin Park, London
Attendance: 38,678

26 February 1949
15:00 GMT

Portsmouth	2–1	Derby County
Clarke 44', 87'		Stamps 41'

Fratton Park, Portsmouth
Attendance: 51,385

26 February 1949
15:00 GMT

Hull City	0–1	Manchester United
		Pearson 74'

Boothferry Park, Hull
Attendance: 55,019

26 February 1949
15:00 GMT

Wolverhampton Wanderers	1–0	West Bromwich Albion
Mullen 63'

Molineux, Wolverhampton
Attendance: 55,684

== Semifinals ==
The draw for the semi-finals was made on Monday, 28 February 1949. Both original matches were played on Saturday, 26 March 1949.

26 March 1949
15:00 GMT

Wolverhampton Wanderers	1–1 (a.e.t.)	Manchester United
Smyth 11'		Mitten 23'

Hillsborough, Sheffield
Attendance: 62,250

Replay

2 April 1949
15:00 GMT

Manchester United	0–1	Wolverhampton Wanderers
		Smyth 86'

Goodison Park, Liverpool
Attendance: 72,631

26 March 1949
15:00 GMT

Portsmouth	1–3	Leicester City
Scott 28' (o.g.)		Revie 8'; Chisholm 47'

Highbury, London
Attendance: 62,000

== Final ==
30 April 1949
15:00 BST

Leicester City	1–3	Wolverhampton Wanderers
Griffiths 47'	Report	Pye 13', 42'; Smyth 64'

Wembley, London
Attendance: 98,920
Referee: R. A. Mortimer (Huddersfield)

== See also ==
- FA Cup final results 1872-
