= Leicester City F.C. =

Association football club in England

Leicester City
- Full name: Leicester City Football Club
- Nickname: The Foxes
- Founded: 1884; 142 years ago (as Leicester Fosse F.C.)
- Ground: King Power Stadium
- Capacity: 32,259
- Owner: King Power International Group
- Chairman: Aiyawatt Srivaddhanaprabha
- Manager: Russell Martin
- League: EFL League One
- 2025–26: EFL Championship, 23rd of 24 (relegated)
- Website: lcfc.com
Home colours	Away colours	Third colours

Leicester City Football Club (/ˈlɛstɜː/ LES-təh) is a professional football club based in Leicester, East Midlands, England. The club competes in EFL League One, the third tier of English football.

The club was founded in 1884 as Leicester Fosse F.C, before they became known as Leicester City in 1919, coinciding with the city of Leicester gaining official city status. They moved to Filbert Street in 1891, were elected to the Football League in 1894, and moved to the nearby Walkers Stadium in 2002. The stadium was renamed to the present day King Power Stadium in 2011.

Leicester City have won seven major trophies within the English football league system, including one Premier League, one FA Cup, three League Cups, and two FA Community Shields. They are currently the sixth most successful team in English football since the turn of the century, as one of only five clubs to have won all three major domestic trophies since 2000. The club's 2015–16 Premier League title win attracted global attention, and they became one of seven clubs to have won the Premier League since its inception in 1992. Prior to 2015–16, Leicester's highest league finish was the second place in the 1928–29 First Division.

The club's longest period of time spent at the top level of English football came between 1957 and 1969. During these years, Leicester reached three FA Cup finals, competed in European football for the first time, and recorded their third highest ever league finish. The club have since participated in a further six European campaigns and two FA Cup finals, reaching the UEFA Champions League quarter-finals in 2016–17, winning the FA Cup in 2021, and reaching the UEFA Europa Conference League semi-finals in 2021–22. Leicester won the League Cup in 1964, 1997, and 2000 respectively, and were finalists in 1964–65 and 1998–99.

== History ==
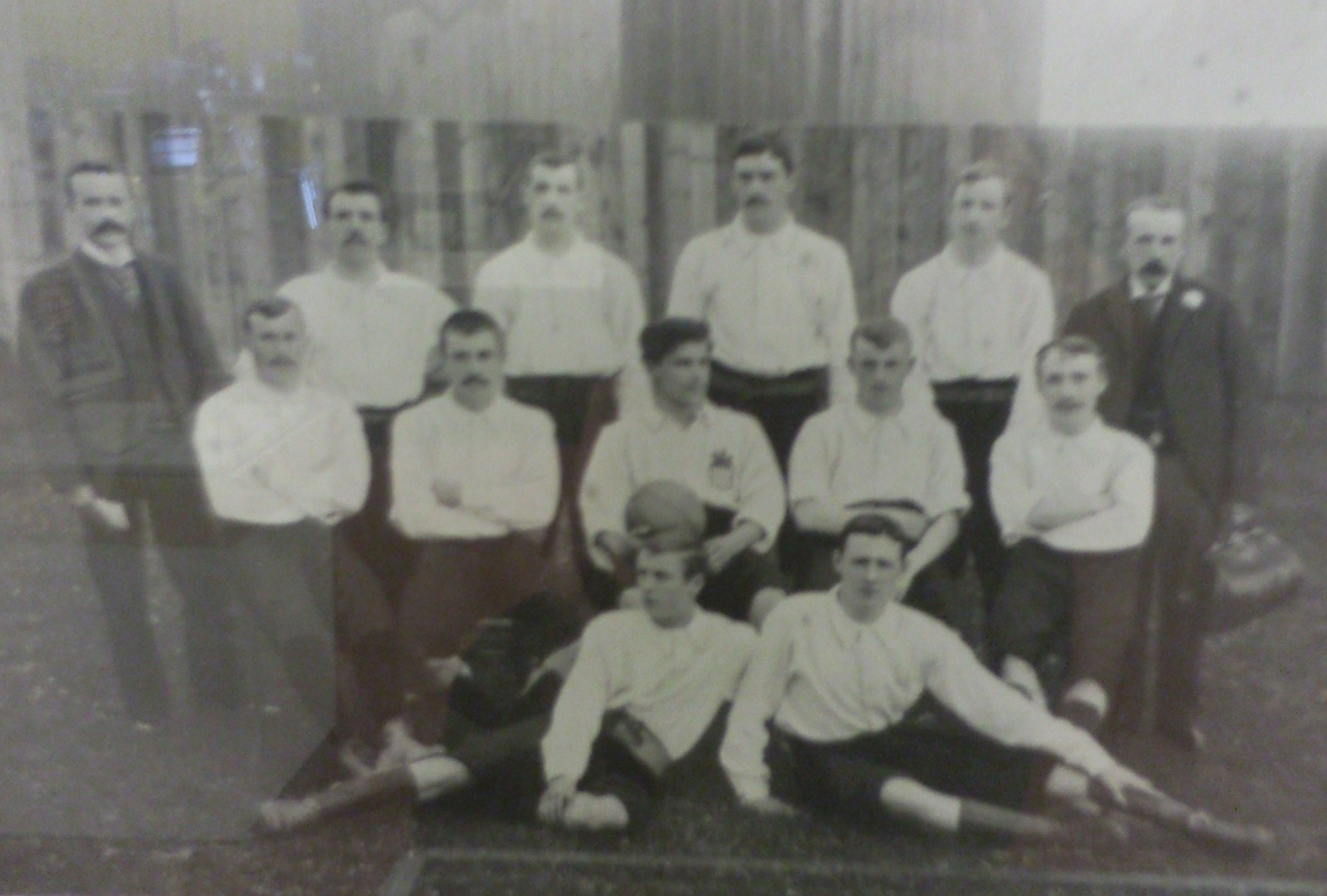
The Leicester Fosse team of 1892.

=== Founding and early years (1884–1949) ===
Formed in 1884 by a group of old boys of Wyggeston School as "Leicester Fosse", the club joined The Football Association (FA) in 1890. Before moving to Filbert Street in 1891, the club played at five different grounds, including Victoria Park south-east of the city centre and the Belgrave Road Cycle and Cricket Ground. The club also joined the Midland League in 1891, and were elected to Division Two of the Football League in 1894 after finishing second. Leicester's first match in the Football League was a 4–3 defeat at Grimsby Town, with a first league win the following week, against Rotherham United at Filbert Street. The same season also saw the team's largest win to date, a 13–0 victory over Notts Olympic in an FA Cup qualifying match. In 1907–08, the club finished as Second Division runners-up, gaining promotion to the First Division, the highest level of English football. However, the club was relegated after a single season which included the team's record defeat, a 12–0 loss against Nottingham Forest.

In 1919, when league football resumed after World War I, Leicester Fosse ceased trading due to financial difficulties. The club was reformed as "Leicester City Football Club" which was particularly appropriate as the borough of Leicester had recently been given city status. Following the name change, the club enjoyed moderate success in the 1920s under the management of Peter Hodge, who won the Division Two title in 1924–25. Hodge left in May 1926 and was replaced two months later by Willie Orr. In the 1927–28 First Division, the club finished in third place before recording their second highest ever league finish a season later in 1928–29, finishing as runners-up by a single point to The Wednesday. However, the 1930s saw a downturn in fortunes, with the club relegated in 1934–35. After promotion in 1936–37, another relegation in 1938–39 would see them finish the decade in Division Two.

=== Post-World War II (1949–2000) ===
Leicester reached the FA Cup final for the first time in their history in 1949, losing 3–1 to Wolverhampton Wanderers. The club, however, was celebrating a week later when a draw on the last day of the season ensured survival in Division Two. In 1954, Leicester won the Division Two championship, with the help of Arthur Rowley, one of the club's most prolific ever strikers. Despite relegation in the previous season, under the management of Dave Halliday, Leicester returned to Division One in 1957, with Rowley scoring a club record 44 goals in one season. Leicester remained in Division One for 12 years until 1969, their longest period to date in the top division of English football. Halliday left the club in October 1958.

Under the management of Matt Gillies, who was appointed on 8 November 1958, and his assistant Bert Johnson, Leicester reached the FA Cup final on another two occasions, but were defeated in both 1961 and 1963. As they lost to double winners Tottenham Hotspur in 1961, Leicester were England's representatives in the 1961–62 European Cup Winners' Cup. For much of the 1962–63 season, the club led the First Division and became nicknamed the "Ice Kings" due to their remarkable run of form on icy and frozen pitches. Leicester eventually finished in 4th place, the club's best post-war finish. Gillies guided Leicester to their first piece of silverware in 1964, when they beat Stoke City 4–3 on aggregate to win the League Cup. Leicester also reached the League Cup final in the following year, but lost 3–2 on aggregate to Chelsea. Gillies and Johnson received praise for their version of the "whirl" and the "switch" system, a system that had previously been used by the Austrian and Hungarian national teams. After a poor start to the season, Matt Gillies resigned as manager in November 1968. His successor Frank O'Farrell was unable to prevent relegation, but the club reached the FA Cup final again in 1969, losing 1–0 to Manchester City.

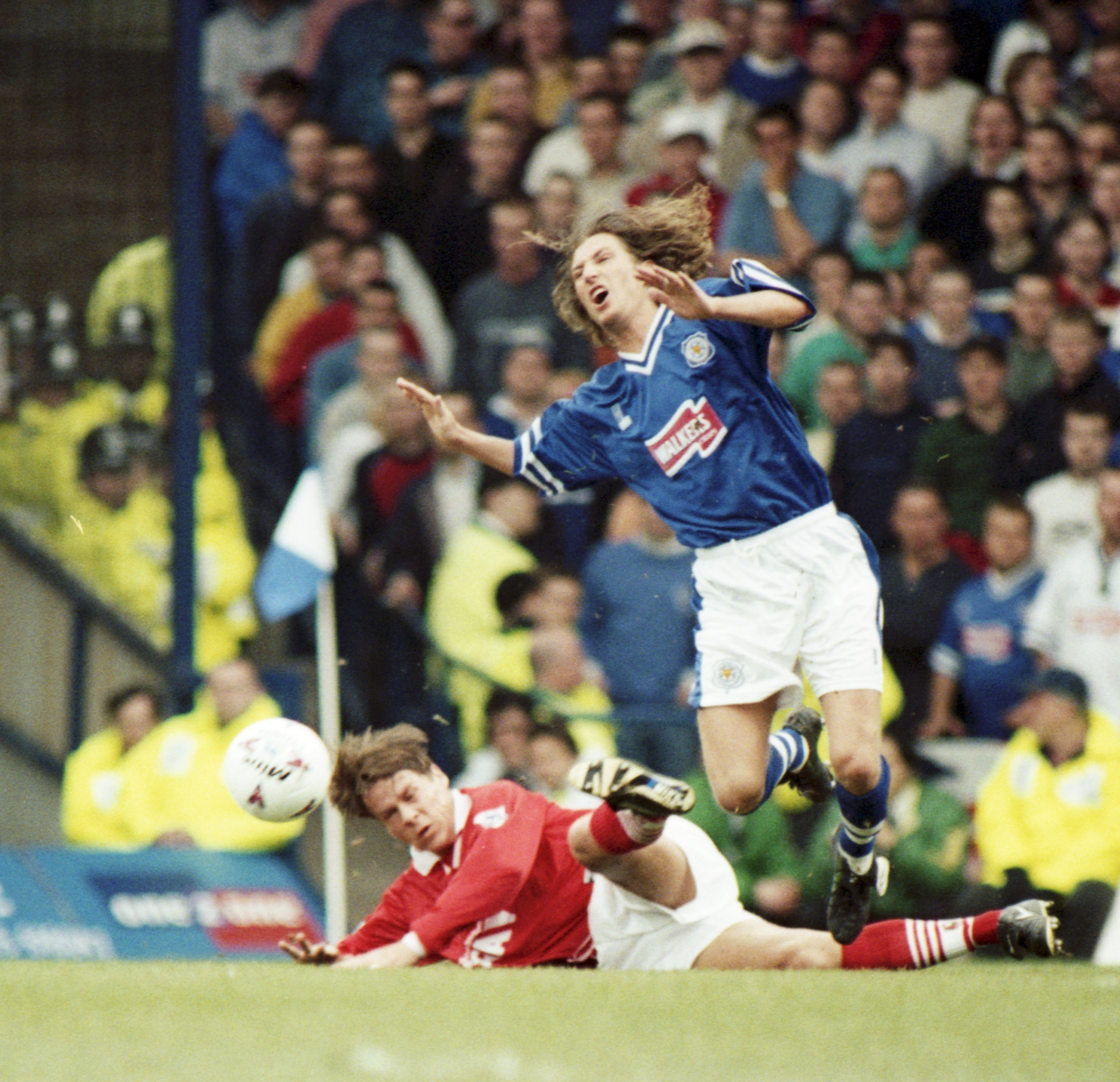
Robbie Savage in action against Barnsley during the 1997–98 season.

In 1971, Leicester were promoted back to the First Division, and won the FA Charity Shield for the first time. Due to double winners Arsenal's commitments in European competition, Second Division winners Leicester were invited to play FA Cup runners-up Liverpool. Leicester won the match 1–0 with Steve Whitworth the winning goalscorer. Jimmy Bloomfield was appointed as the club's new manager in June 1971, and the team remained in the First Division throughout his tenure. Leicester also reached the FA Cup semi-final in 1973–74. Frank McLintock, a notable former player of seven years in a successful period from the late 1950s to the mid-1960s, succeeded Bloomfield in 1977.

On 19 March 1977, Winston White became Leicester's first black player to feature for the club, in an away match at Stoke City. The club was relegated at the end of the 1977–78 season and McLintock resigned. Jock Wallace resumed the tradition of successful Scottish managers (after Peter Hodge and Matt Gillies) by steering Leicester to the Second Division championship in 1980. Wallace was unable to keep Leicester in the First Division, but they reached the FA Cup semi-final in 1982. Under Wallace, one of Leicester City's most famous home-grown players, Gary Lineker, emerged into the first-team squad.

Leicester's next manager was Gordon Milne, who was appointed in August 1982. He achieved promotion with the club a year later in 1983. Lineker helped Leicester maintain their place in the First Division, but was sold to Everton in 1985. Two years later, Leicester were relegated, having failed to find a suitable replacement to partner Alan Smith, who was then sold to Arsenal after Leicester went down. Milne left in 1986 and was replaced in 1987 by David Pleat, who managed the club until January 1991. Gordon Lee succeeded Pleat and was put in charge until the end of the 1990–91 season, guiding Leicester clear of relegation to the third tier of English football.

Brian Little took over in May 1991 and by the end of the 1991–92 season, Leicester had reached the play-off final for a place in the new Premier League. They lost to Blackburn Rovers by way of a penalty from former Leicester striker Mike Newell. The club also reached the play-off final the following year, but lost 4–3 to Swindon Town. In the 1993–94 season, Leicester were promoted from the play-offs at the third attempt under Brian Little, beating East Midlands rivals Derby County 2–1 in the final. Little quit as Leicester manager in the following November to take charge at Aston Villa, and his successor Mark McGhee was unable to save Leicester from finishing second bottom of the 1994–95 Premier League.

McGhee left the club unexpectedly in December 1995, while Leicester were top of the Second Division, to take charge of Wolverhampton Wanderers. McGhee was replaced by Martin O'Neill. Under O'Neill, Leicester reached the play-off final in 1996 and gained promotion to the Premier League. Following promotion, Leicester established themselves in the Premier League with four successive top 10 finishes. O'Neill also ended Leicester's 33-year wait for a major trophy, winning the League Cup in 1997 and again in 2000. Thus, the club qualified for the UEFA Cup in 1997–98 and 2000–01, which was their first participation in European football since 1961. In June 2000, O'Neill left Leicester City to take over as manager of Celtic.

=== Decline in the early 21st century (2000–2008) ===
Martin O'Neill was replaced by former England under-21 coach Peter Taylor. During this time, one of Leicester's European campaigns ended in a 3–1 defeat to Red Star Belgrade on 28 September 2000 in the UEFA Cup. Leicester began well under Taylor's management, topping the Premier League for two weeks in the autumn and remaining in contention for a European place for most of the season, before a late-season collapse following an FA Cup semi-final defeat to Wycombe Wanderers, dragged them down to a 13th-place finish. Taylor was dismissed by the club after a poor start to the 2001–02 season, and his successor Dave Bassett lasted just six months. Bassett was replaced by his assistant Micky Adams – the change of management being announced just before relegation was confirmed. Leicester won just five league matches all season.

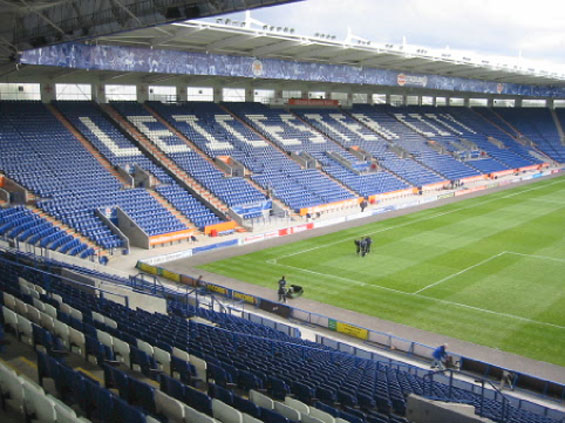
The East Stand, Walkers Stadium, pictured in 2007.

The club moved into the new 32,314-seat Walkers Stadium at the start of the 2002–03 season, ending 111 years at Filbert Street. Walkers, the Leicester-based crisp manufacturers, acquired the naming rights for a ten-year period. In October 2002, the club went into administration with debts of £30 million. The key attributing factors were the loss of TV money (ITV Digital, itself in administration, had promised money to First Division clubs for TV rights), the large wage bill, lower-than-expected fees for players transferred to other clubs and the cost of building the new stadium. The manager, Micky Adams, was banned from the transfer market for most of the season, even after the club was rescued with a takeover by a Gary Lineker-led consortium. In the club's first season at the new stadium, they gained automatic promotion back to the Premier League (then known as the FA Barclaycard Premiership) with more than 90 points, recording only two home defeats throughout the campaign. However, Leicester were relegated in the following season (2003–04), to the newly labelled Championship (previously known as Division One).

In September 2003, as a direct response to Leicester's promotion earlier that year, football authorities introduced new regulations aiming to prevent clubs from gaining a competitive sporting advantage through financial insolvency. This notably included the introduction of a points deduction for any club that enters administration in the future. In October 2004, Micky Adams resigned as manager, and Craig Levein was appointed as his replacement. The club parted company with Levein after 15 months in charge on 25 January 2006. Assistant manager Rob Kelly took over as caretaker manager, and was subsequently appointed to see out the rest of the 2005–06 season, later winning three out of his first four matches in charge. Kelly steered Leicester to safety and in April 2006, was given the manager's job on a permanent basis.

In October 2006, ex-Portsmouth chairman Milan Mandarić was quoted as saying he was interested in buying the club, reportedly at a price of around £6 million, with the current playing squad valued at roughly £4.2 million. The takeover was formally announced on 13 February 2007. On 11 April 2007, the club parted ways with Rob Kelly, and Nigel Worthington was appointed as caretaker manager until the end of the 2006–07 season. Worthington saved the club from a first-ever relegation to the third tier, but was not offered the job on a permanent basis. On 25 May 2007, the club announced former Milton Keynes Dons manager Martin Allen as their new manager on a three-year contract. Allen's relationship with Mandarić quickly became so fractured that after only four matches, he left the club by mutual consent on 29 August 2007. On 13 September 2007, Mandarić announced Gary Megson as Leicester's new manager, citing his "wealth of experience" as a deciding factor in the appointment. However, Megson left on 24 October 2007 after only six weeks in charge, following an approach made for his services by Bolton Wanderers. Mandarić placed Frank Burrows and former player Gerry Taggart in the shared position as caretaker managers until a permanent manager was appointed.

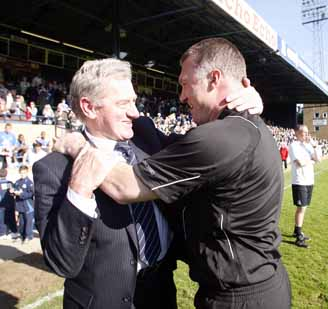
Pearson and Mandarić after winning the Football League One title.

On 22 November 2007, Ian Holloway was appointed as the club's new manager, and he became the first Leicester manager in over 50 years to win his first league match in charge. However, this proved to be an unsuccessful appointment, as Leicester were relegated from the Championship at the end of the 2007–08 season. Holloway left by mutual consent after less than a season at the club, and was replaced by Nigel Pearson.

=== Rise back to Premier League and King Power takeover (2008–2015) ===
Following relegation, the 2008–09 League One campaign was Leicester's first season outside the top two levels of English football, but they hit this nadir only seven years before becoming the 2015–16 Premier League champions – one of the fastest ever rises to the top of the English football league system. Leicester returned to the Championship at the first attempt in 2008–09, finishing as champions of League One after a 2–0 win at Southend United, with two matches still to play. The 2009–10 season saw Leicester's revival under manager Nigel Pearson continue. The club finished in 5th place and reached the Championship play-offs in their first season back in the second tier. In the first leg match at home to Cardiff City, they lost 0–1. In the second leg match away from home, though coming from 2–0 down on aggregate to briefly lead 3–2, they eventually lost to a penalty shoot-out. At the end of the season, Pearson left Leicester to become the manager of Hull City, claiming he felt the club seemed reluctant to keep him, and citing that Paulo Sousa's appearance at both play-off games hinted at a possible replacement. On 7 July 2010, Sousa was confirmed as Pearson's successor.

In August 2010, after securing a three-year shirt sponsorship agreement with the Thai duty-free retailer King Power, Mandarić sold the club to Asian Football Investments (AFI), a Thai-led consortium headed by King Power owner Vichai Srivaddhanaprabha (then known as Vichai Raksriaksorn) and his son, Aiyawatt. Mandarić, who remained an investor in AFI, continued to serve as the club's chairman.

On 1 October 2010, after a poor start to the season which saw the club bottom of the Championship with only one win from their first nine league matches, Leicester parted company with Paulo Sousa with immediate effect. Two days later on 3 October 2010, Sven-Göran Eriksson, who had been approached by the club after a 6–1 defeat to bottom-of-the-table Portsmouth two weeks earlier, was appointed as Sousa's replacement on a two-year contract. On 10 February 2011, Vichai Srivaddhanaprabha, representing the Thai-based Asian Football Investments (AFI) consortium, was appointed chairman of the club following Mandarić's departure in November 2010 to take over at Sheffield Wednesday.

Leicester were viewed as one of the favourites for promotion in the 2011–12 season, but on 24 October 2011, following an inconsistent start with just 5 wins from the first 13 matches, Eriksson left the club by mutual consent. Three weeks later, on 15 November 2011, Nigel Pearson returned to the club as Eriksson's successor. Pearson would go on to lead Leicester to a 6th-place finish in the 2012–13 season, after guiding the club to a 5th-place finish four seasons earlier in 2009–10. Leicester won the first leg match against Watford 1–0, but were defeated 3–2 on aggregate over both matches. In the second leg at Vicarage Road, Manuel Almunia made a double save from an Anthony Knockaert late penalty, before Troy Deeney scored at the other end in dramatic fashion to send Watford to Wembley at Leicester's expense.

In May 2014, Leicester's march up the league system hit a breakthrough. The 2–1 home win over Sheffield Wednesday, combined with losses by Queens Park Rangers and Derby County, allowed Leicester City to clinch promotion to the Premier League after a ten-year absence. Later that month, a win at Bolton Wanderers saw Leicester become champions of the 2013–14 Championship, which was a joint-record 7th second-tier title. Upon conclusion of the season, chairman Vichai Srivaddhanaprabha outlined his ambition for the club to achieve a top five finish in the Premier League within three years.

Leicester started their first season back in the Premier League since 2004 with a 2–2 draw at home to Everton on the opening day. The club then claimed their first Premier League win since May 2004 four weeks later, on 13 September 2014, in a 1–0 away victory at Stoke City. On 21 September 2014, Leicester went on to produce one of the greatest comebacks in Premier League history, winning 5–3 against Manchester United at the King Power Stadium. The club made Premier League history by becoming the first team since the league's launch in 1992 to overcome Manchester United by a two-goal deficit.

During the 2014–15 season, Leicester slipped to the bottom of the league table after picking up just 19 points from 29 matches. By 3 April 2015, they were seven points adrift from safety. This could have brought a sudden end to Leicester's seven-year rise up the league system, but seven wins from their final nine league matches ensured they finished the season in 14th place on 41 points. They concluded the season with a 5–1 win over relegated Queens Park Rangers on the final day, and Leicester's upturn in results was described as one of the Premier League's greatest ever escapes from relegation. They also became only the third team in Premier League history to survive after being bottom at Christmas (the other two being West Bromwich Albion in 2005 and Sunderland in 2014), and no team with fewer than 20 points from 29 matches had previously stayed up.

On 30 June 2015, the club took the surprise decision to part company with manager Nigel Pearson, after four years in charge. The decision was taken after Pearson's son, James Pearson, was involved in a "racist sex tape" during a post-season goodwill tour in Thailand. Pearson's departure was also linked to a number of public relations issues involving him throughout the season. On 13 July 2015, the club appointed Claudio Ranieri as their new manager ahead of the 2015–16 Premier League season. Despite an initially sceptical reaction to Ranieri's appointment, Leicester made an exceptional start to the season. Striker Jamie Vardy scored 13 goals over 11 consecutive matches from August to November, breaking the record held by Ruud van Nistelrooy of scoring in 10 consecutive Premier League matches. On 19 December 2015, Leicester defeated Everton 3–2 at Goodison Park to top the Premier League on Christmas Day, having been bottom of the table exactly 12 months earlier.

=== The club's most successful era (2016–2021) ===

The usual starting line-up of the Premier League winning team

The club qualified for the UEFA Champions League for the first time in their history on 10 April 2016, as a result of a 2–0 away win at Sunderland and Tottenham Hotspur's 3–0 win over Manchester United. The 2016–17 Champions League campaign would also be the club's first season in European football for 15 years.

On 2 May 2016, Leicester City won the Premier League, after Chelsea came from two goals down at Stamford Bridge to draw 2–2 with Tottenham Hotspur, in a match that was labelled "The Battle Of The Bridge." Bookmakers thought Leicester's title win was so unlikely that Ladbrokes and William Hill offered odds of 5,000–1 for it at the start of the season, which subsequently resulted in the largest payout in British sporting history, with total winnings of £25 million. Multiple newspapers described Leicester's title success as the greatest sporting shock ever; a number of bookmakers (including Ladbrokes and William Hill) had never paid out at such long odds for any sport. The scale of the surprise title victory attracted global attention for the club and the city of Leicester. The Economist declared it would be "pored over for management lessons." Several commentators viewed it as transformative to the expectations faced by clubs outside of the league's traditional 'big six.' On 16 May 2016, over 240,000 supporters lined the streets of Leicester to celebrate the club's historic title win.

During the 2015–16 campaign, Leicester became known for their counterattacking style of play, "incredible pace in the areas it is most essential" and defensive solidity. Former manager Nigel Pearson was widely credited as having laid the foundations for Leicester's major success. In reaction to the title triumph, executive chairman of the Premier League Richard Scudamore said:

"If this was a once in every 5,000-year event, then we've effectively got another 5,000 years of hope ahead of us."

Leicester, while performing well in the UEFA Champions League, struggled domestically during 2016–17, spending much of the first few months in the bottom half of the Premier League table. In December 2016, Ranieri was awarded coach of the year, and Leicester were awarded team of the year, at the BBC Sports Personality of the Year awards. However, on 23 February 2017, Ranieri was controversially dismissed by the club, due to the team's continuing poor form which resulted in them being only one point above the relegation zone. Ranieri's departure was met with significant upset and anger from sections of the media, with famous former player Gary Lineker calling it "very sad" and "inexplicable", while Manchester United manager José Mourinho blamed it on "selfish players". Rumours began emerging some days later that players had been meeting with the owners to discuss the removal of Ranieri without him knowing, which sparked widespread outrage over social media, but these claims were never proven. On 3 March 2017, it was confirmed that the club would be legally challenging the English Football League over a breach of Financial Fair Play (FFP) rules relating to the 2013–14 season. Following Ranieri's departure, Craig Shakespeare took over as caretaker manager, and in his first match in charge, he led Leicester to a 3–1 victory over 5th place Liverpool. In his second match as caretaker, Shakespeare led Leicester to another 3–1 victory, this time over Hull City. Following these two results, it was announced on 12 March 2017 that Shakespeare would become manager until the end of the season.

Leicester were placed in Group G of the 2016–17 UEFA Champions League, alongside Porto, Copenhagen and Club Brugge. In their inaugural Champions League campaign, they went undefeated in their first five matches to progress to the knockout stages as group winners. Leicester then faced La Liga club Sevilla in the round of 16 and were defeated 2–1 in the first leg at the Vicente Calderon Stadium. In the second leg at the King Power Stadium, Leicester won 2–0 on the night, and 3–2 on aggregate, to advance to the quarter-finals. They then faced Atlético Madrid, and lost 1–0 away in the first leg, before drawing 1–1 at home in the second leg. This put an end to Leicester's first European campaign in 15 years, after losing 2–1 on aggregate, exiting the competition as quarter-finalists. Leicester did however, maintain an unbeaten home record throughout their 2016–17 UEFA Champions League campaign.

Craig Shakespeare, having impressed during his caretaker spell, was appointed full-time on a three-year contract. However, following a poor start to the season, he was dismissed as manager in October 2017 after four months officially in charge, with Leicester 18th in the table. He was subsequently replaced by Claude Puel on 25 October 2017. By Christmas, Leicester were in 8th place in the Premier League and finished 9th at the end of the season. On 21 February 2018, it was widely reported that the club had reached a settlement with the English Football League to pay £3.1 million for a Financial Fair Play (FFP) dispute relating to the 2013–14 season. The EFL stated that Leicester "did not make any deliberate attempt to infringe the rules or to deceive, and that the dispute arose out of genuine differences of interpretation of the rules between the parties."

On 27 October 2018, following a home match against West Ham United, a Leonardo AW169 helicopter carrying chairman Vichai Srivaddhanaprabha and four others malfunctioned and crashed outside the club's stadium. The crash took place shortly after takeoff from the pitch, and all five people on board the helicopter died. One year later, on the first anniversary of the tragedy, The Vichai Srivaddhanaprabha Memorial Garden opened on the site of the crash. Three years later, to commemorate the late chairman's 64th birthday, The Khun Vichai Srivaddhanaprabha Statue was unveiled on 4 April 2022.

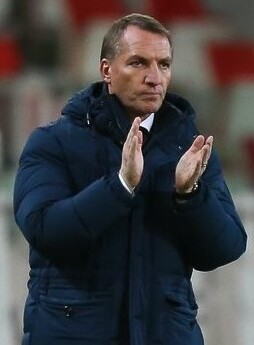
Brendan Rodgers

During the early months of 2019, Leicester went on a seven match winless run, which included four successive home defeats. Following a 1–4 home defeat to Crystal Palace, the club parted company with manager Claude Puel on 24 February 2019, with the club in 12th place. Former Liverpool manager Brendan Rodgers was appointed as his replacement, and the club finished the season again in 9th place.

The 2019–20 season under Rodgers started with Leicester picking up 38 points from their first 16 matches, which included a record eight-match winning streak from 19 October to 8 December 2019. On 25 October 2019, they recorded a 0–9 away win at Southampton, the joint-largest win in Premier League history and the largest away win in English top-flight history. During the same season, the club reached the semi-final stage of the League Cup but lost out to Aston Villa over two legs. Despite competing in the top four for most of the season, Leicester suffered a drop-off in form at the end of the season, winning only two of their nine games following the resumption of play due to the coronavirus pandemic. Three defeats in their last four matches saw them slide into 5th place, which was the club's second-highest Premier League finish, ensuring them a place in the UEFA Europa League for the following season.

The club's finances were heavily impacted by the COVID pandemic, with the parent company King Power International Group being in the travel retail sector. Despite this, the club spent £57 million on transfer fees in the summer of 2020, which came in at a net spend of £10 million, with £46 million generated from player sales. In December 2020, the club moved to a new £100m state-of-the-art training facility. For a second consecutive season, Leicester spent most of the campaign in the top four places, but finished 5th again in the 2020–21 Premier League season. They therefore qualified for the UEFA Europa League for the second time in two years. On 15 May 2021, Leicester City won the FA Cup for the first time, having lost four previous finals in 1949, 1961, 1963 and 1969, securing a second major trophy in the space of five years. Youri Tielemans scored the only goal against Chelsea at Wembley Stadium. The club subsequently became the 6th most successful team in English football since the turn of the century, as one of only five clubs to have won all three major domestic trophies since 2000.

=== Post-success and downfall (2021–present) ===
During the 2021 summer transfer window, Leicester again spent more than £50 million on new signings, but this time did not sell any key players for high profit, which went against the club's model from previous years. The summer of 2021 dramatically increased Leicester's wages-to-turnover ratio, but the club subsequently failed to qualify for European football in the Premier League season which followed (2021–22), finishing in 8th place. On 7 August 2021, Leicester won the FA Community Shield for the second time in their history. In their 2021–22 UEFA Europa League campaign, Leicester came third in their group and were transferred to the newly established UEFA Europa Conference League. They went on to reach their first European semi-final, losing out to eventual winners AS Roma over two legs. Leicester's spending during the 2022 summer transfer window was heavily restricted, amid concerns over breaching Financial Fair Play regulations. At the same time however, the club were reportedly prioritising investment in infrastructure, to better compete with the Premier League's 'big six' in the long term.

Brendan Rodgers left Leicester City on 2 April 2023, after four years in charge, with ten games remaining and the club in the relegation zone. Dean Smith was appointed as his replacement until the end of the season. On 28 May 2023, despite a 2–1 home win over West Ham United, Leicester were relegated as a consequence of Everton's 1–0 home victory over AFC Bournemouth. The club went down with the highest ever squad value and wage bill outside of the Premier League's traditional 'big-six' clubs, and the 2022–23 season ended the club's nine-year stint in the Premier League. This made Leicester only the second former Premier League champions to be relegated from the league since it began in 1992–93, following Blackburn Rovers in 1998–99.

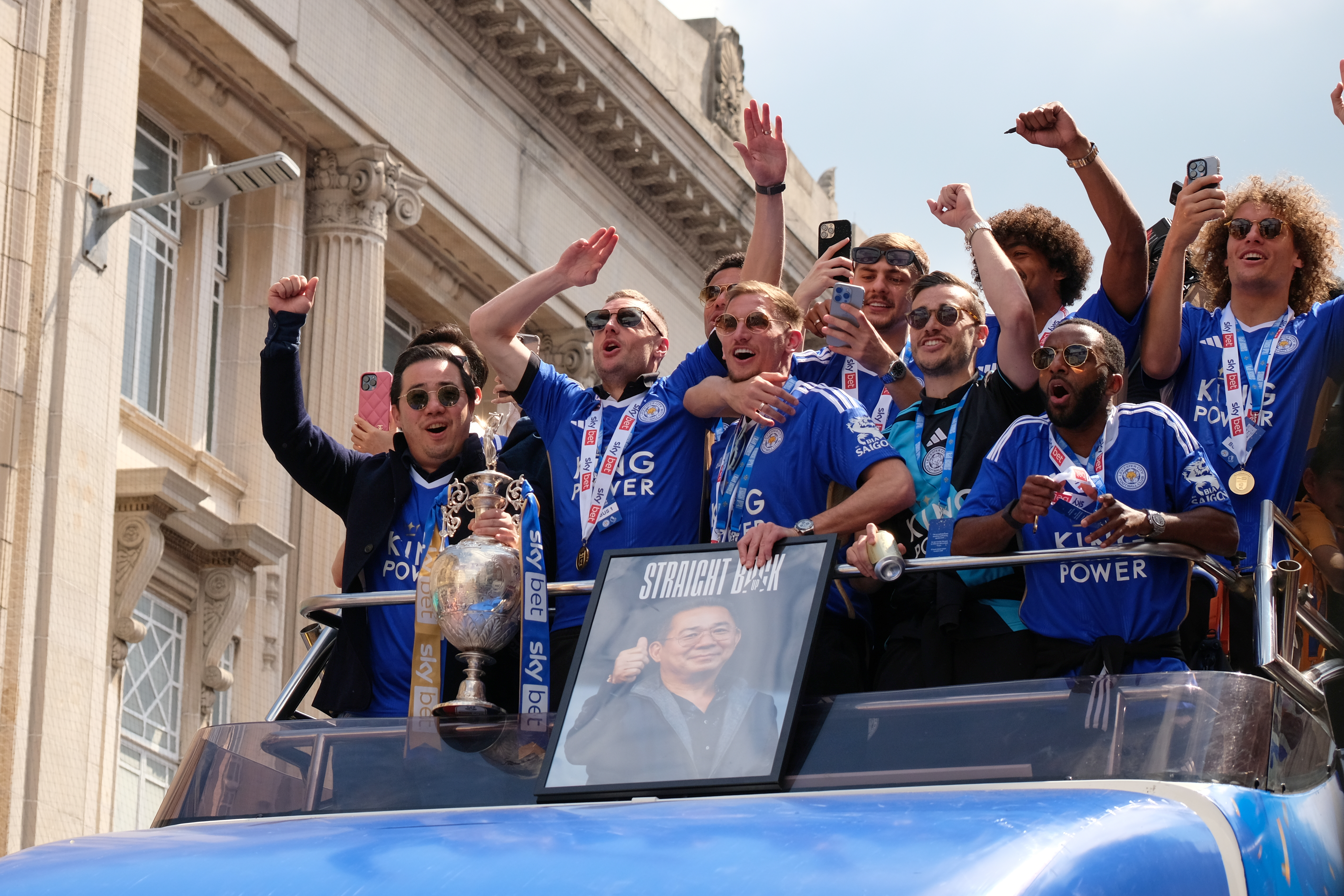
Leicester were promoted back to the Premier League in 2024.

On 16 June 2023, Enzo Maresca was appointed as the club's new manager ahead of the 2023–24 EFL Championship season. During this record-breaking campaign, Leicester made their best start to a league season, and the best start since the league became known as the Championship in 2004–05. The club went on to gain promotion back to the Premier League as champions at the first attempt, registering 31 wins, 4 draws and 11 defeats. This was also Leicester's 8th second-tier title which is currently a record for the division.

In March 2024, the club were referred to an independent commission by the Premier League over an alleged breach of Profit and Sustainability Rules (PSR) for the 2022–23 season. In September 2024, the club successfully appealed the PSR case relating to the 2022–23 season, arguing the Premier League did not lawfully have jurisdiction to apply any sanction, after ceasing to become a member of the league at the end of the season. On 3 June 2024, Enzo Maresca left the club to join Chelsea ahead of the 2024–25 Premier League season. Leicester appointed Steve Cooper as his replacement on 20 June 2024, but the club parted company with Cooper after five months on 25 November 2024. Five days later on 29 November 2024, Ruud van Nistelrooy was named as Leicester's new manager.

On 20 April 2025, the club was relegated from the Premier League for the second time in three years, with five matches remaining in the season. On 20 May 2025, Leicester were charged by the Premier League with three separate breaches of PSR rules. On 27 June 2025, the club terminated Ruud van Nistelrooy's contract with immediate effect. On 15 July 2025, the club appointed Martí Cifuentes as manager on a three-year contract.

On 2 October 2025, it was announced that Susan Whelan had stepped down as CEO at the club after 15 years, following "a mutual decision" with owner and chairman Aiyawatt Srivaddhanaprabha. On 14 November 2025, it was reported that the club would be overhauling its football operations, including the appointment of a Technical Director for the first time. The club announced the appointment of Kamonthip Netthanomsak as Interim Managing Director on the same day. On 25 January 2026, the club announced that it had parted company with manager Marti Cifuentes, which was the third managerial change in the space of 14 months. During this period of time, Srivaddhanaprabha conducted several media interviews for the first time since the club's title success of 2016.

On 5 February 2026, it was announced that the club had been deducted six points for breaching the EFL's profit and sustainability rules by £20.8 million, over the three-year period up to and including the 2023–24 season. Leicester were also found to have been in breach of Premier League rules by not providing their annual accounts to the league by the specified deadline. This consequently moved the club's league position down from 17th to 20th place in the 2025–26 EFL Championship, which put them above the relegation zone only on goal difference. In the three years leading up to 30 June 2024, Leicester made combined losses of more than £200 million, exceeding the maximum limit of £81 million in losses over a three-year rolling period.

The PSR case against Leicester and subsequent points deduction, although officially enacted by the English Football League, was initiated by the Premier League in May 2025, with the independent commission handling the case also appointed by the Premier League. This was the first time ever that a sporting sanction had been imposed by the EFL on behalf of the Premier League. The rule enabling such a sanction to come into effect was directly related to the club's successful legal challenge two years prior. On 18 February 2026, Gary Rowett was announced as the club's new manager on a short-term contract until the end of the 2025–26 season. On 19 February 2026, it was announced that both Leicester City and the Premier League had officially lodged appeals against the recent six point deduction.

On 3 March 2026, the club announced a "new executive leadership structure", which included the appointments of Kevin Davies as Chief Executive Officer, James McCarron as Sporting Director, and Russell Jones as Commercial Director. Jon Rudkin, the long-standing Director of Football, was controversially appointed to the role of Chief Football Officer. The club's statement also confirmed Interim Managing Director Kamonthip Netthanomsak would continue in her role, and that recruitment for a new Finance Director was underway, a role held by Kevin Davies (the newly appointed CEO) since May 2023. On 8 April 2026, it was announced that both the Premier League and Leicester City were unsuccessful in their appeals against the six point deduction, which was handed to the club on 5 February 2026.

On 21 April 2026, following a 2–2 draw at home to Hull City, Leicester were relegated to EFL League One, the third tier of the English football league system, for only the second time in their history with two matches remaining in the season. The club's player wage bill was the highest to ever get relegated from the second tier of English football. They became one of five clubs to suffer back-to-back relegations in the Premier League era, and 2025–26 was the club's lowest ever points return (46 points) and lowest ever final league position (23rd) in the Championship era. During the course of the season, Leicester also went 30 league matches without keeping a clean sheet, which was their worst run outside of the top level of English football since 1948. The club's downfall from Premier League champions in 2016, FA Cup winners in 2021 and regular participation in European football, has been described as "one of the worst declines in the modern era". Other media outlets have previously taken a different view on the club's major success in the 21st century, suggesting it had been tainted by the financial irregularities of 2002 (entering administration controversially) and 2014 (breaching FFP rules in the same season they were promoted back to the Premier League). The club's FA Cup triumph in 2021, although in the first year of the three-year rolling period that led to the six point deduction in February 2026, was not officially related to the 2021-2024 accounting period. This was because the 2021 FA Cup final was included within the previous financial year which ended on 30 June 2021.

On 15 June 2026, Russell Martin was appointed as the club's new First Team Manager on a three-year contract.

== Club identity ==
Leicester City's first home colours worn from 1884 to 1886.

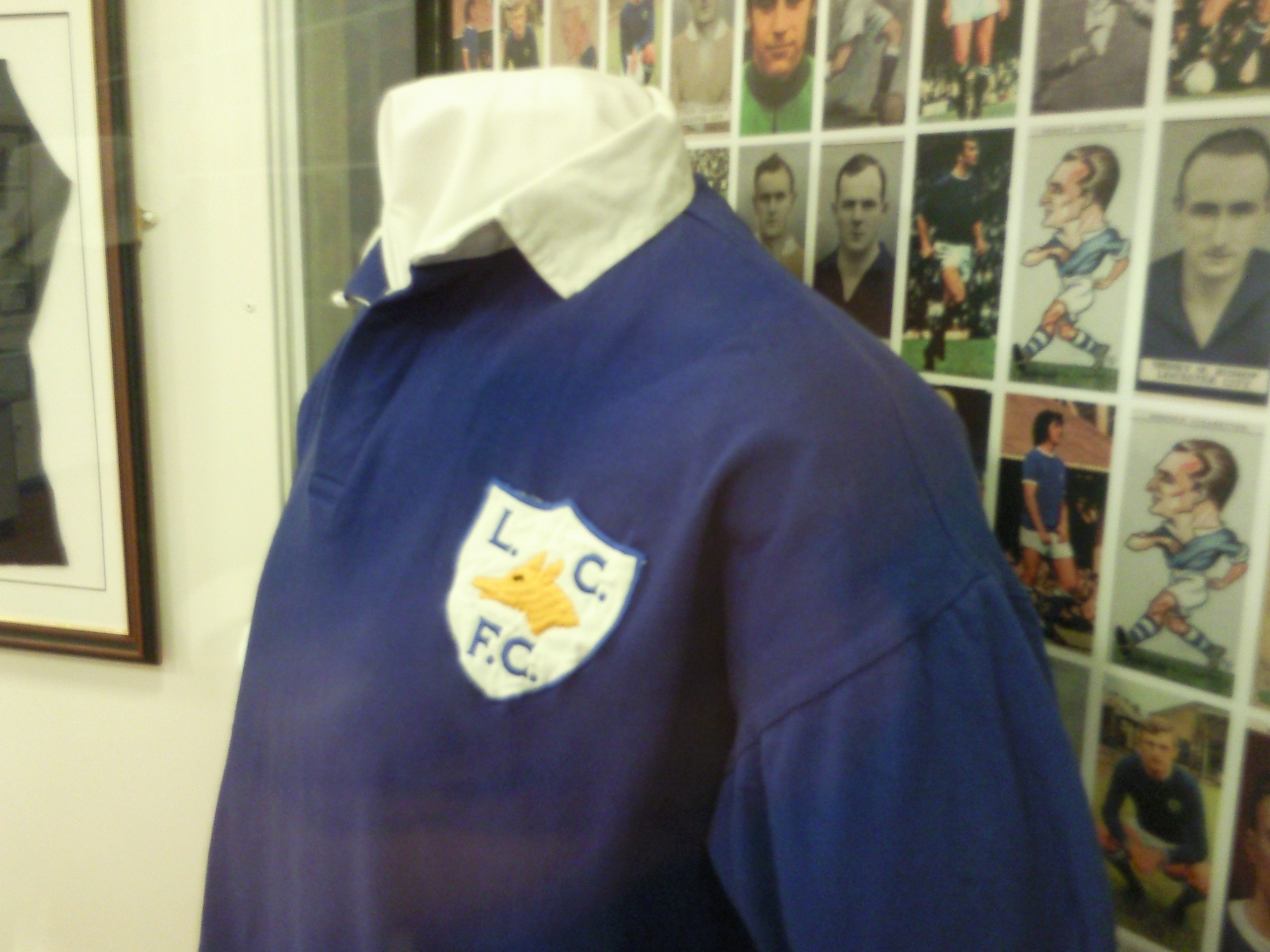
This shirt, worn in 1948, was the first to bear the club's badge.

The club's traditional home colours of royal blue shirts, white shorts and either white or blue socks have been used for the team's kits throughout most of their history. Since the 2015–16 season, the club has played in an all-blue strip with the exception of the 2019–20 and 2021–22 seasons, where they reverted to wearing white shorts. In 1948, an image of a fox was first incorporated into the club's crest. Since 1992, the club's badge has featured a fox's head overlaid onto a cinquefoil, which represents the city of Leicester's coat of arms. This was the first time that the cinquefoil and the fox were incorporated together on the club's crest.

Leicester City's badge for the 2009–10 season to commemorate 125 years as a football club.

The club's stadium move in 2002 prompted some changes to the crest, and the updated design was incorporated into the new stadium, with the emblem used as the main feature on the outside of the West Stand. For the 2009–10 season, the club's 125th anniversary year, a special edition badge was worn on the home and away kits. For this season's away kit, there was also a return to the first colours worn by the club (originally Leicester Fosse), albeit with black shorts as opposed to the original white. This kit returned once again for the 2023–24 season, having also featured during the 2004–05 season. The club's current crest has been in use since 2010.

In 1941, the club adopted the playing of the "Post Horn Galop" at home matches, to signal both teams entering the pitch. To the present day, the tune is usually played live on the pitch for the first half, while a modern version of the tune is played over the PA system for the second half. The club also play a modern version of their anthem "When You're Smiling" before kick-off on home matchdays, with the connection to the song dating back to the late 1970s. Foxes Never Quit is the club's motto, with these words placed above the tunnel inside the stadium.

=== Kit suppliers and shirt sponsors ===
Year	Kit Manufacturer	Primary Shirt Sponsor	Sleeve Sponsor
1972–1976	Bukta	None	None
1976–1979	Admiral	None	None
1979–1983	Umbro	None	None
1983–1986	Admiral	Ind Coope	None
1986–1987	Admiral	John Bull	None
1987–1988	Admiral	Walkers Crisps	None
1988–1990	Scoreline	Walkers Crisps	None
1990–1992	Bukta	Walkers Crisps	None
1992–1999	Fox Leisure	Walkers Crisps	None
1999–2000	Fox Leisure / Le Coq Sportif	Walkers Crisps	None
2000–2001	Le Coq Sportif	Walkers Crisps	None
2001–2003	Le Coq Sportif	LG	None
2003–2005	Le Coq Sportif	Alliance & Leicester	None
2005–2007	JJB Sports	Alliance & Leicester	None
2007–2009	Jako	Topps Tiles	None
2009–2010	Joma	None (Home) / LOROS Hospice Care (Away)	None
2010–2012	Burrda	King Power	None
2012–2016	Puma	King Power	None
2017–2018	Puma	King Power	Siam Commercial Bank
2018–2020	Adidas	King Power	Bia Saigon
2020–2021	Adidas	Tourism Authority of Thailand (League) / King Power (Cup/Europe)	Bia Saigon
2021–2023	Adidas	FBS	Bia Saigon
2023–2024	Adidas	King Power	Bia Saigon
2024–	Adidas	BC.GAME	Bia Saigon

Since 2018, Leicester City's kit has been manufactured by German sportswear company Adidas. Previous manufacturers have included Bukta (1972–76, 1990–92), Admiral (1976–79, 1983–88), Umbro (1979–83), Scoreline (1988–90), Fox Leisure (1992–2000), Le Coq Sportif (1999–2005), JJB (2005–07), Jako (2007–09), Joma (2009–10), Burrda (2010–12) and Puma (2012–18).

The club's current main shirt sponsor is BC.GAME. The first sponsorship logo to appear on a Leicester shirt was that of Ind Coope in 1983. British snack food manufacturer Walkers Crisps are the club's official snack partner. Walkers Crisps have held a long association with the club, sponsoring their shirts from 1987 to 2001 and the stadium from 2002 to 2011. Other sponsors have included John Bull (1986–87), LG (2001–03), Alliance & Leicester (2003–07), Topps Tiles (2007–09), Loros (2009–10), King Power (2010–21, 2023–24), Tourism Authority of Thailand (2020–21) and FBS (2021–23). Siam Commercial Bank became the club's first sleeve sponsor in the 2017–18 season. Since the 2018–19 season, the sleeve sponsor has been Bia Saigon.

== Stadium and training ground ==
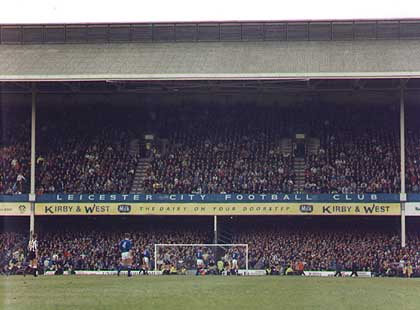
The "Double Decker" Stand at Filbert Street.

In their early years, Leicester played at numerous grounds, but have only played at two since they joined the Football League. They first started out by playing on a field by Fosse Road, hence the original club name of Leicester Fosse. They moved from there to Victoria Park, and subsequently to Belgrave Road. Upon turning professional, the club moved to Mill Lane. After eviction from Mill Lane, the club played at the County Cricket ground while seeking a new ground. The club secured the use of an area of land by Filbert Street and moved there in 1891.

Some improvements by noted football architect Archibald Leitch occurred in the Edwardian era, and in 1927, a new two-tier stand was built nicknamed "The Double Decker." This stand would persist until the ground's closure in 2002. Filbert Street saw no further development (except for compulsory seating) until 1993, when the Main Stand was demolished and replaced by the new Carling Stand. The addition of the new stand, while the rest of the ground had been untouched since the 1920s, led manager Martin O'Neill to joke that he used to "lead new signings out backwards" so they only saw the Carling Stand.

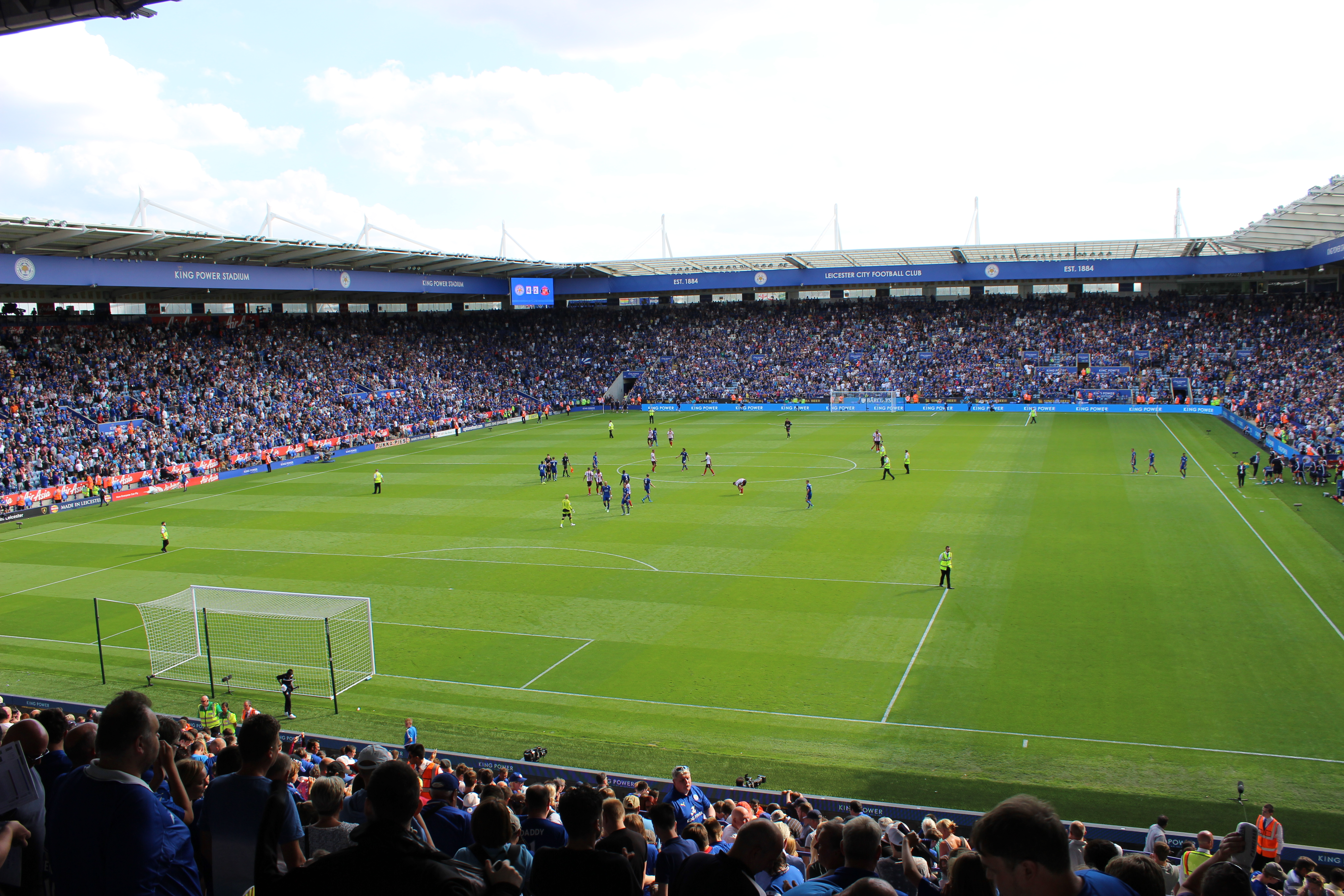
King Power Stadium, formerly known as the Walkers Stadium, has been the home of Leicester City since 2002.

The club moved away from Filbert Street in 2002, to a new 32,500-capacity all-seater stadium located less than 300 yards away. The address of the current site, Filbert Way, retains a link with the club's former home ground. The first match hosted at the stadium was a 1–1 draw against Athletic Bilbao, Bilbao's Tiko scored the first goal at the stadium and Jordan Stewart became the first Leicester player to score. The first competitive match was a 2–0 victory against Watford.

The stadium was known as the Walkers Stadium until 2011 in a sponsorship deal with Leicester-based food manufacturers Walkers. On 19 August 2010, it emerged that the new owners King Power wanted to rename the stadium King Power Stadium, and had plans to increase the capacity to 42,000 should Leicester secure promotion. On 5 July 2011, it was announced that the Walkers Stadium would now be known as the King Power Stadium.

The stadium currently has a capacity of 32,259, with plans formally approved in December 2023 to extend this to 40,000. In 2020, the club moved into a new state-of-the-art training complex in the Leicestershire village of Seagrave, described as being "one of the world's most advanced training facilities." The club's former training ground Belvoir Drive now serves as the training ground for Leicester City Women.

== Support, rivalries, and hooliganism ==
The origin of the club's anthem "When You're Smiling", sung by supporters at home and away matches, dates back to the late 1970s with a modern version of the tune currently played before kick-off on home matchdays.

The club's main rivals are Nottingham Forest, Derby County and Coventry City. Lesser rivalries also exist with Chelsea, which dates back to around 1980, and more recently with Tottenham Hotspur, as both teams battled to win the 2015–16 Premier League. Leicester were widely considered to be Nottingham Forest's main rivals prior to the mid-1970s. However, when Brian Clough was appointed as Forest manager in 1975, much to the dismay of Derby fans, the rivalry between Forest and Derby quickly intensified. The Leicester-Forest rivalry is however, still prominent on the border of both cities, and on the border of both counties (Leicestershire and Nottinghamshire). The same is also applicable to the rivalry with Derby County, while the rivalry with Coventry City tends to be most keenly felt by supporters in the southern parts of Leicestershire.

Like many other clubs in English football, Leicester have had links to hooliganism. In August 2000, Leicester were listed as the 2nd most violent football club in England and Wales. In June 2002, Leicester were one of six clubs who were banned from taking travelling supporters to Millwall during the 2002–03 season. Between 2019 and 2023, Leicester were listed as having the 5th highest number of hooligans at matches. During the 2022–23 and 2023–24 seasons, the club were ranked 3rd and 4th respectively for football banning orders. In March 2025, a report revealed that in the past five seasons, Leicester were ranked 12th overall in the country for arrests.

== European record ==
Season	Competition	Round	Club	Home	Away	Aggregate
1961–62	European Cup Winners' Cup	PR	(Northern Ireland) Glenavon	3–1	4–1	7–2
1961–62	European Cup Winners' Cup	1R	(Spain) Atlético Madrid	1–1	0–2	1–3
1997–98	UEFA Cup	1R	(Spain) Atlético Madrid	0–2	1–2	1–4
2000–01	UEFA Cup	1R	(Federal Republic of Yugoslavia) Red Star Belgrade	1–1	1–3 (Note: 'Away' leg held at the Gerhard Hanappi Stadium, Vienna, Austria)	2–4
2016–17	UEFA Champions League	GS	(Portugal) Porto	1–0	0–5	1st
2016–17	UEFA Champions League	GS	(Belgium) Club Brugge	2–1	3–0	1st
2016–17	UEFA Champions League	GS	(Denmark) Copenhagen	1–0	0–0	1st
2016–17	UEFA Champions League	R16	(Spain) Sevilla	2–0	1–2	3–2
2016–17	UEFA Champions League	QF	(Spain) Atlético Madrid	1–1	0–1	1–2
2020–21	UEFA Europa League	GS	(Portugal) Braga	4–0	3–3	1st
2020–21	UEFA Europa League	GS	(Greece) AEK Athens	2–0	2–1	1st
2020–21	UEFA Europa League	GS	(Ukraine) Zorya Luhansk	3–0	0–1	1st
2020–21	UEFA Europa League	R32	(Czech Republic) Slavia Prague	0–2	0–0	0–2
2021–22	UEFA Europa League	GS	(Italy) Napoli	2–2	2–3	3rd
2021–22	UEFA Europa League	GS	(Russia) Spartak Moscow	1–1	4–3	3rd
2021–22	UEFA Europa League	GS	(Poland) Legia Warsaw	3–1	0–1	3rd
2021–22	UEFA Conference League	KPO	(Denmark) Randers	4–1	3–1	7–2
2021–22	UEFA Conference League	R16	(France) Rennes	2–0	1–2	3–2
2021–22	UEFA Conference League	QF	(Netherlands) PSV Eindhoven	0–0	2–1	2–1
2021–22	UEFA Conference League	SF	(Italy) Roma	1–1	0–1	1–2

Notes

- LCFC goals listed first
- KPO: Knockout round play-offs
- PR: Preliminary round
- 1R: First round
- GS: Group stage
- R32: Round of 32
- R16: Round of 16
- QF: Quarter-final
- SF: Semi-final

== Managers ==
The club's current manager is Russell Martin, who was appointed on 15 June 2026.

Nigel Pearson and Peter Hodge have both had two separate spells in charge of the club. Dave Bassett also had a second spell as caretaker manager after his first spell as permanent manager. Up until Peter Hodge was hired after World War I, the club had no official manager. A nominal role of secretary/manager was employed, though the board and the selection committee took control of most team affairs. It was Hodge who instated a system at the club for the manager having complete control over player and staff recruitment, team selection, and tactics. Though Hodge was originally titled "secretary/manager" he has retrospectively been named as the club's first official "manager."

Matt Gillies is the club's longest-serving manager. Between 1958 and 1968, he led Leicester City to four major domestic cup finals including a first major trophy, as well as four top eight finishes in the First Division. He was notably also the manager of the club's first participation in European football in 1961–62. During the 1962–63 season, under the management of Gillies, the club were realistic contenders for the First Division and FA Cup double, along with further European qualification. It was in this campaign that Gillies' team famously became known as "The Ice Kings."

Since the 10-year reign of Matt Gillies, four other managers have guided the club to major success, including Jimmy Bloomfield, Martin O'Neill, Claudio Ranieri, and Brendan Rodgers.

== Records and statistics ==
Historical league positions of Leicester City within the English Football League system.

Graham Cross holds the record for the most Leicester appearances, with the defender playing 600 games between 1960 and 1976, increased from 599 following the club's decision to incorporate the 1971 FA Charity Shield into official records. However, Adam Black holds the record for the most appearances in the league with 528 matches between 1920 and 1935.

Striker Arthur Chandler is currently the club's all-time record goalscorer, scoring 273 times in his 12 years at the club. He also scored in 8 consecutive matches during the 1924–25 season. The most goals managed in a single season for the club is 44 by Arthur Rowley, in the 1956–57 season. The fastest goal in the club's history was scored in 9 seconds by Matty Fryatt against Preston North End in April 2006.

Striker Jamie Vardy broke the previous Premier League record of 11 goals in 11 consecutive matches by scoring 13 goals in 11 consecutive matches during the 2015–16 Premier League season. Vardy's goal at Sunderland on 10 April 2016 saw him become the first Leicester player since Gary Lineker in 1984–85 to score 20 top flight goals for the club, having already become Leicester's highest Premier League scorer in a single season. Vardy finished the campaign with 23 goals and was awarded the Premier League Golden Boot for the season.

The record transfer fee paid by Leicester for a player was in the region of £32-to-40 million for midfielder Youri Tielemans from AS Monaco. The highest transfer fee received for a Leicester player was approximately £80 million from Manchester United for Harry Maguire; at the time of the transfer this was the eleventh-highest-ever fee, the highest-ever move between two English teams, and the highest-ever fee for a defender.

Leicester's record home attendance is 47,298, for a fifth-round FA Cup match against Tottenham Hotspur at Filbert Street in 1928. The current record home attendance at the current stadium is 32,242, for a Premier League match against Sunderland on 8 August 2015. The highest-ever attendance for a non-competitive football match at the King Power Stadium stands at 32,188, for a pre-season friendly against Real Madrid on 30 July 2011.

Leicester's highest ever league finish is first place in the Premier League in 2015–16. The club currently holds the all-time record for second tier titles with eight.

Leicester's longest unbeaten run in league football to date came between 1 November 2008 and 7 March 2009. The team remained unbeaten for 23 games on their way to the League One title. The club's longest run of consecutive victories in league football is currently nine, which the team achieved between 21 December 2013 and 1 February 2014 in the Championship.

During the 2015–16 season, Leicester achieved many new club records in what The Daily Telegraph described as "one of the most astonishing league titles of all-time". They recorded the most consecutive wins and fewest losses in any of the club's previous Premier League seasons, as well as the fewest away defeats in any previous top-flight season. The record for consecutive victories came against Watford, Newcastle United, Crystal Palace, Southampton and Sunderland. Coincidentally, Leicester kept a record of five straight clean sheets against each of the same five opponents. The club's home crowds in 2015–16 saw their team beaten just once in the Premier League all season.

Leicester made their UEFA Champions League debut in the 2016–17 season, their fourth appearance in European football. The club became the third English team to win on their Champions League debut, after Manchester United in 1994 and Newcastle United in 1997. They also became the first English team to win away on their Champions League debut, and win all three of their opening matches in the competition. Leicester are currently the first and only team in Champions League history to keep clean sheets in each of their opening four matches in the competition. In March 2017, Leicester became the 50th team to reach the UEFA Champions League quarter-finals.

During the start of the 2019–20 Premier League campaign, the club won 12 matches from their opening 16 fixtures, which was the most victories recorded at this stage of any previous league season.

On 25 October 2019, the Leicester team under manager Brendan Rodgers set the record for the highest margin of away victory in English top-flight history, defeating Southampton 9–0 at St Mary's Stadium. In doing so, they also tied the record for the highest margin of victory in Premier League history, equalling Manchester United's 9–0 home victory over Ipswich Town in 1995. As a result, Leicester City hold the all-time top tier records for the biggest defeat, biggest away win, and highest-scoring draw.

On 8 December 2019, a 1–4 away win at Aston Villa saw the club set a new record of eight consecutive victories. This surpassed the record of five consecutive wins during the 2015–16 Premier League title-winning campaign, and also surpassed Leicester's previous all-time top flight record of seven consecutive victories achieved between December 1962 and March 1963.

On 15 May 2021, Leicester City won the FA Cup for the first time in their history, having lost four previous finals in 1949, 1961, 1963 and 1969. The club's record signing Youri Tielemans scored the winning goal against Chelsea at Wembley Stadium.

On 28 May 2023, the club was relegated from the Premier League with the highest ever squad value and player wages outside of the Premier League's traditional 'big-six' clubs.

During the 2023–24 EFL Championship season, the club set a number of new records. They made their best start to a league season to date, and the best in the competition's history (since becoming known as the Championship in 2004). They also notably matched the all-time record of nine consecutive league wins home and away, and went four home matches without conceding for the first time since 1973.

During the 2024–25 Premier League season, Leicester became the first team in English football history to lose nine consecutive home matches without scoring a goal. This was statistically the club's worst ever season in the Premier League era.

During the course of the 2025–26 EFL Championship season, the club went 30 league matches without keeping a clean sheet between September 2025 and March 2026, which was their worst run outside of the top level of English football since 1948. On 28 February 2026, following a 0–2 defeat to Norwich City, the club recorded four consecutive home defeats for the first time outside of the top division since 1914.

== League history ==
Since their election to the Football League in 1894, Leicester City have spent all but two seasons within the top two tiers of English football (as of 2026). The club's longest stint at the top level to date came between 1957 and 1969. During these years, the club reached three FA Cup finals, participated in European football for the first time, and recorded their third highest ever league finish. During the 2008–09 season, Leicester played in League One, the third tier of English football, for the first time following the club's relegation from the Championship. However, the club made an instant return to the second tier and were promoted as 2008–09 League One champions.

1894–1908 Division 2 (L2); 1908–1909 Division 1 (L1); 1909–1915 Division 2 (L2); 1919–1925 Division 2 (L2); 1925–1935 Division 1 (L1); 1935–1937 Division 2 (L2)	1937–1939 Division 1 (L1); 1946–1954 Division 2 (L2); 1954–1955 Division 1 (L1); 1955–1957 Division 2 (L2); 1957–1969 Division 1 (L1); 1969–1971 Division 2 (L2)	1971–1978 Division 1 (L1); 1978–1980 Division 2 (L2); 1980–1981 Division 1 (L1); 1981–1983 Division 2 (L2); 1983–1987 Division 1 (L1); 1987–1992 Division 2 (L2)	1992–1994 Division 1 (L2); 1994–1995 Premier League (L1); 1995–1996 Division 1 (L2); 1996–2002 Premier League (L1); 2002–2003 Division 1 (L2); 2003–2004 Premier League (L1)	2004–2008 Championship (L2); 2008–2009 League One (L3); 2009–2014 Championship (L2); 2014–2023 Premier League (L1); 2023–2024 Championship (L2); 2024–2025 Premier League (L1)	2025–2026 Championship (L2); 2026– League One (L3)

L1 = Level 1 of the football league system; L2 = Level 2 of the football league system; L3 = Level 3 of the football league system.
- Seasons spent at Level 1 of the football league system: 56
- Seasons spent at Level 2 of the football league system: 64
- Seasons spent at Level 3 of the football league system: 2

(up to and including 2026–27)

== Players ==
=== First-team squad ===
As of 1 October 2026

Note: Flags indicate national team as defined under FIFA eligibility rules; some limited exceptions apply. Players may hold more than one non-FIFA nationality.

No.	Pos.	Nation	Player
1	GK	POL	Jakub Stolarczyk
2	DF	ENG	Jayden Joseph
4	DF	ENG	Ben Nelson
5	DF	ITA	Caleb Okoli
6	MF	ENG	John Lundstram
7	MF	WAL	Wes Burns
8	MF	ENG	Conor Chaplin
9	FW	BIH	Admir Bristrić
11	MF	WAL	Liam Cullen
12	MF	IRL	Will Smallbone
13	GK	WAL	David Cornell
14	FW	JAM	Bobby De Cordova-Reid
15	DF	AUS	Harry Souttar
16	DF	IRL	Warren O'Hora
17	FW	DEN	Emil Riis

No.	Pos.	Nation	Player
18	DF	ENG	Christian McFarlane (on loan from Manchester City)
20	MF	ENG	Harry Howell (on loan from Brighton & Hove Albion)
21	GK	ARG	Franco Ravizzoli
23	MF	ENG	Tommy Watson (on loan from Brighton & Hove Albion)
24	DF	FIN	Ilari Kangasniemi
25	MF	ENG	Louis Page
26	DF	MLI	Woyo Coulibaly
27	MF	ENG	Kamari Doyle (on loan from Brighton & Hove Albion)
29	GK	ENG	Alex McCarthy
32	DF	ENG	Olabade Aluko
33	DF	ENG	Luke Thomas
36	MF	ENG	Sammy Braybrooke
37	MF	ENG	Will Alves
61	GK	ENG	Stevie Bausor

=== Out on loan ===
Note: Flags indicate national team as defined under FIFA eligibility rules; some limited exceptions apply. Players may hold more than one non-FIFA nationality.

No.	Pos.	Nation	Player
10	MF	ENG	Stephy Mavididi (at Watford until 30 June 2027)
22	MF	ENG	Oliver Skipp (at Charlton Athletic until 30 June 2027)
34	MF	ENG	Michael Golding (at Shrewsbury Town until 30 June 2027)

No.	Pos.	Nation	Player
49	FW	ENG	Kirsten Otchere (at Cheltenham Town until 30 June 2027)
65	FW	ENG	Jake Evans (at Cheltenham Town until 30 June 2027)
—	DF	DEN	Victor Kristiansen (at Panathinaikos until 30 June 2027)

== Management ==
As of 9 November 2026

Directors & Senior Management
Role	Person
Chairman	Aiyawatt Srivaddhanaprabha
Vice Chairman	Apichet Srivaddhanaprabha
Vice Chairman	Liu Shilai
Chief Football Officer	Jon Rudkin
Sporting Director	James McCarron
Chief Executive Officer	Kevin Davies
Managing Director	Kamonthip Netthanomsak
Commercial Director	Russell Jones
Finance Director	Vacant
Football Operations Director	Andrew Neville
Operations Director	Alan Dawson
Communications & Marketing Director	Anthony Herlihy
Associate Director of Training Ground Operations	Tony Kavanagh
Associate Director of Content, Marketing & Digital	Sam Chambers

Management Staff
Role	Person
First Team Manager	Russell Martin
First Team Assistant Coach	Steve Morison
First Team Assistant Coach	Andy King
First Team Goalkeeping Coach	Tom Weal
First Team Fitness Coach	Rhys Owen
Head of Fitness and Conditioning	Matt Reeves
Head of Medicine	Dr. Simon Morris
Head Physiotherapists	Gary Silk; Niall Stevens
Kit Manager	Paul McAndrew
Head of Senior Player Recruitment	Martyn Glover

== Player statistics ==
=== Player of the Year ===
Leicester City's Player of the Year award is voted for by the club's supporters at the end of every season.

Year	Winner
1987–88	(England) Steve Walsh
1988–89	(England) Alan Paris
1989–90	(England) Gary Mills
1990–91	(England) Tony James
1991–92	(England) Gary Mills
1992–93	(Northern Ireland) Colin Hill
1993–94	(England) Simon Grayson
1994–95	(England) Kevin Poole
1995–96	(England) Garry Parker
1996–97	(England) Simon Grayson
1997–98	(Scotland) Matt Elliott
1998–99	(England) Tony Cottee
1999–2000	(Northern Ireland) Gerry Taggart
2000–01	(Wales) Robbie Savage

Year	Winner
2001–02	(Wales) Robbie Savage
2002–03	(Scotland) Paul Dickov
2003–04	(England) Les Ferdinand
2004–05	(Australia) Danny Tiatto
2005–06	(Iceland) Joey Guðjónsson
2006–07	(Canada) Iain Hume
2007–08	(England) Richard Stearman
2008–09	(Scotland) Steve Howard
2009–10	(England) Jack Hobbs
2010–11	(England) Richie Wellens
2011–12	(Denmark) Kasper Schmeichel
2012–13	(Jamaica) Wes Morgan
2013–14	(England) Danny Drinkwater
2014–15	(Argentina) Esteban Cambiasso

Year	Winner
2015–16	(Algeria) Riyad Mahrez
2016–17	(Denmark) Kasper Schmeichel
2017–18	(England) Harry Maguire
2018–19	(Portugal) Ricardo Pereira
2019–20	(England) Jamie Vardy
2020–21	(Belgium) Youri Tielemans
2021–22	(England) James Maddison
2022–23	(Nigeria) Kelechi Iheanacho
2023–24	(England) Kiernan Dewsbury-Hall
2024–25	(England) Jamie Vardy
2025–26	(Wales) Jordan James

=== English Hall of Fame Members ===
The following have played for Leicester City and have been inducted into the English Football Hall of Fame:

- (England) Gordon Banks 2002 (Inaugural Inductee)
- (England) Peter Shilton 2002 (Inaugural Inductee)
- (England) Gary Lineker 2003
- (England) Don Revie 2004 (Inducted as a manager)
- (Scotland) Frank McLintock 2009

=== Football League 100 Legends ===
The Football League 100 Legends is a list of "100 legendary football players" produced by The Football League in 1998, to celebrate the 100th season of league football. The list also included Premier League players, and the following former Leicester City players were included:

- (England) Arthur Rowley
- (England) Gordon Banks
- (Scotland) Frank McLintock
- (England) Peter Shilton
- (England) Gary Lineker

=== Players with over 300 appearances for Leicester ===
Includes competitive appearances only. Current players in bold.

As of 17 October 2026

- (England) Graham Cross 600
- (Scotland) Adam Black 557
- (England) Jamie Vardy 500
- (Denmark) Kasper Schmeichel 479
- (England) Hugh Adcock 460
- (England) Mark Wallington 460
- (England) Steve Walsh 450
- (England) Arthur Chandler 419
- (Scotland) John Sjoberg 414
- (Wales) Mal Griffiths 409
- (England) Steve Whitworth 401
- (Wales) Andy King 379
- (England) Sep Smith 373
- (England) Mike Stringfellow 370
- (England) Richie Norman 365
- (England) Gordon Banks 356
- (Northern Ireland) John O'Neill 345
- (Scotland) Dave Gibson 339
- (England) Peter Shilton 339
- (England) Colin Appleton 333
- (England) Dennis Rofe 324
- (Jamaica) Wes Morgan 323
- (Northern Ireland) Paul Ramsey 322
- (England) Arthur Rowley 321
- (Scotland) Arthur Lochhead 320
- (Turkey) Muzzy Izzet 319
- (Scotland) Ian Wilson 318
- (England) Derek Hines 317
- (England) Marc Albrighton 313
- (England) Lenny Glover 306
- (Nigeria) Wilfred Ndidi 303

=== Players with 50 or more goals for Leicester ===
Includes competitive appearances only. Current players in bold.

As of 18 May 2025

- (England) Arthur Chandler 273
- (England) Arthur Rowley 265
- (England) Jamie Vardy 200
- (England) Ernie Hine 156
- (England) Derek Hines 117
- (Scotland) Arthur Lochhead 114
- (England) Gary Lineker 103
- (England) Mike Stringfellow 97
- (Scotland) Johnny Duncan 95
- (Scotland) Jimmy Walsh 91
- (England) Jack Lee 84
- (England) Alan Smith 84
- (England) Frank Worthington 78
- (Wales) Mal Griffiths 76
- (England) Ken Keyworth 76
- (Scotland) Danny Liddle 71
- (England) Arthur Maw 64
- (England) Matty Fryatt 62
- (Wales) Andy King 62
- (England) Steve Walsh 62
- (Nigeria) Kelechi Iheanacho 61
- (England) Steve Lynex 60
- (England) David Nugent 59
- (England) Fred Shinton 58
- (England) Jack Bowers 56
- (England) James Maddison 55
- (Scotland) Dave Gibson 53
- (Scotland) Jackie Sinclair 53
- (England) Hugh Adcock 52
- (England) George Dewis 51
- (Scotland) Gary McAllister 51

== Honours ==
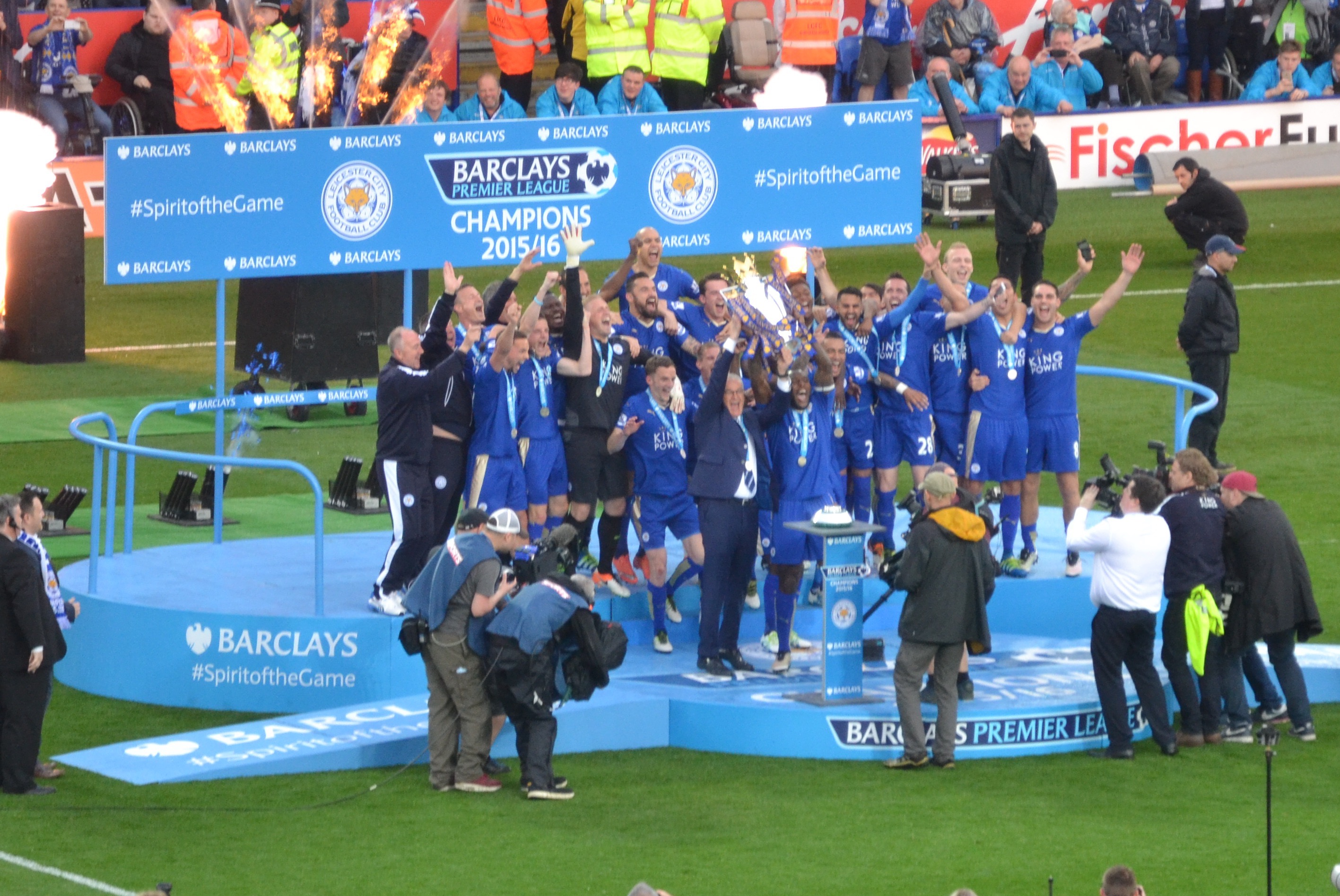
Leicester City players lifting the 2015–16 Premier League trophy.

Leicester City are currently one of five clubs, including Manchester United, Manchester City, Chelsea and Liverpool, to have won the Premier League, FA Cup and League Cup since 2000. Since the start of the millennium, they are the 6th most successful club in English football and one of 14 clubs to have won all four major domestic competitions. The club also hold the record for the most second division titles with eight.

League

- First Division / Premier League (level 1)
  - Champions: 2015–16
  - Runners-up: 1928–29
- Second Division / First Division / Championship (level 2)
  - Champions (8, record): 1924–25, 1936–37, 1953–54, 1956–57, 1970–71, 1979–80, 2013–14, 2023–24
  - Runners-up: 1907–08, 2002–03
  - Play-off winners: 1994, 1996
- League One (level 3)
  - Champions: 2008–09

Cup

- FA Cup
  - Winners: 2020–21
  - Runners-up: 1948–49, 1960–61, 1962–63, 1968–69
- League Cup
  - Winners: 1963–64, 1996–97, 1999–2000
  - Runners-up: 1964–65, 1998–99
- FA Charity Shield / FA Community Shield
  - Winners: 1971, 2021
  - Runners-up: 2016
