= 1962–63 Everton F.C. season =

English football club season

Everton
1962–63 season
- Manager: Harry Catterick
- Ground: Goodison Park
- First Division: 1st
- FA Cup: Fifth Round
- Inter-Cities Fairs Cup: First Round
- Top goalscorer: League: Roy Vernon (24); All: Roy Vernon (27)

During the 1962–63 English football season, Everton F.C. competed in the Football League First Division.

The Big Freeze of 1962–1963, was one of the coldest winters on record Football matches in the English leagues suffered because of the severe effects of the winter weather. Some matches in the FA Cup were rescheduled ten or more times. Matches in the fifth and sixth rounds, scheduled for 16 February and 9 March respectively, were played on 16 and 30 March. A board known as the Pools Panel was set up to adjudicate postponed matches to provide the football pool results. From 22 December to 12 February, Everton completed no competitive matches. The delays occurred before under-soil heating became widespread at major venues. When the thaw arrived, a backlog of fixtures had to be hastily determined. The Football League season was extended by four weeks from its original finishing date of 27 April. The final league fixtures took place one day before the rescheduled FA Cup final.

== Final league table ==
Pos	Team	Pld	W	D	L	GF	GA	GAv	Pts	Qualification or relegation
1	Everton (C)	42	25	11	6	84	42	2.000	61	Qualification for the European Cup preliminary round
2	Tottenham Hotspur	42	23	9	10	111	62	1.790	55	Qualification for the European Cup Winners' Cup second round (Note: Tottenham Hotspur qualified for the European Cup Winners' Cup second round as the 1962–63 European Cup Winners' Cup winners.)
3	Burnley	42	22	10	10	78	57	1.368	54	
4	Leicester City	42	20	12	10	79	53	1.491	52	
5	Wolverhampton Wanderers	42	20	10	12	93	65	1.431	50	

Source: World Football
Rules for classification: 1) Points; 2) Goal average; 3) Goals scored
(C) Champions

== Results ==
Win	Draw	Loss

=== Football League First Division ===
18 August 1962 1	Burnley	1-3	Everton	Burnley, Lancs.
	R. Pointer 10'		Vernon 19'; Bingham 62'; Young 75'	Stadium: Turf Moor; Attendance: 37,100

22 August 1962 2	Everton	3-1	Man Utd	Walton, Liverpool
	Young 12', 13'; Parker 43'		I. Moir 64'	Stadium: Goodison Park; Attendance: 69,500

25 August 1962 3	Everton	4-1	Sheffield Wed	Walton, Liverpool
	Vernon 26' (pen.), 70'; Stevens 38'; Young 74'		D. Layne 19'	Stadium: Goodison Park; Attendance: 51,504

29 August 1962 4	Man Utd	0-1	Everton	Manchester, Lancs.
			Vernon 79' (pen.)	Stadium: Old Trafford; Attendance: 63,675

1 September 1962 5	Fulham	1-0	Everton	Fulham, Middx
	S. Brown 21'			Stadium: Craven Cottage; Attendance: 30,582

5 September 1962 6	Everton	3-0	Leyton Orient	Walton, Liverpool
	Bingham 4'; Gabriel 43'; Vernon 58' (pen.)			Stadium: Goodison Park; Attendance: 51,542

8 September 1962 7	Everton	3-2	Leicester	Walton, Liverpool
	Vernon 25' (pen.); Stevens 43'; Young 50'		J. Walsh 26'; H. Riley 73'	Stadium: Goodison Park; Attendance: 48,738

12 September 1962 8	Leyton Orient	3-0	Everton	Leyton, Essex
	N. Deeley 53'; G. Bolland 57'; D. Dunmore 78'			Stadium: Brisbane Road; Attendance: 21,847

15 September 1962 9	Bolton	0-2	Everton	Bolton, Lancs.
			Bingham 49'; Gabriel 82'	Stadium: Burnden Park; Attendance: 27,404

22 September 1962 10	Everton	2-2	Liverpool	Walton, Liverpool
	Vernon 29' (pen.); Morrissey 62'		K. Lewis 35'; R. Hunt 90'	Stadium: Goodison Park; Attendance: 72,488

29 September 1962 11	Everton	4-2	West Brom	Walton, Liverpool
	Morrissey 20', 43', 55'; Young 49'		B. Harris 31' (o.g.); A. Jackson 73'	Stadium: Goodison Park; Attendance: 45,471

6 October 1962 12	Wolves	0-2	Everton	Wolverhampton
			Bingham 60'; Young 74'	Stadium: Molineux Stadium; Attendance: 44,506

13 October 1962 13	Everton	1-1	Aston Villa	Walton, Liverpool
	Vernon 33' (pen.)		A. Baker 77'	Stadium: Goodison Park; Attendance: 53,035

27 October 1962 14	Everton	3-1	Ipswich	Walton, Liverpool
	Vernon 24' (pen.); Morrissey 74', 75'		D. Moran 53'	Stadium: Goodison Park; Attendance: 39,695

3 November 1962 15	Man City	1-1	Everton	Moss Side, Manchester
	P. Dobing 34'		Wignall 75'	Stadium: Maine Road; Attendance: 40,336

10 November 1962 16	Everton	5-0	Blackpool	Walton, Liverpool
	Bingham 25'; Young 41', 58'; Gabriel 76'; Stevens 85'			Stadium: Goodison Park; Attendance: 39,517

13 November 1962 17	Nottingham Forest	3-4	Everton	West Bridgford, Nottinghamshire
	C. Addison 2'; C. Palmer 14' (pen.); J. Quigley 70'		Vernon 20', 28'; R. Veall 43'; Gabriel 71'	Stadium: City Ground; Attendance: 31,610

17 November 1962 18	Blackburn	3-2	Everton	Blackburn, Lancs.
	I. Lawther 65'; F. Pickering 82'; B. Douglas 89' (pen.)		Harris 67'; Stevens 68'	Stadium: Ewood Park; Attendance: 30,243

24 November 1962 19	Everton	3-0	Sheffield Utd	Walton, Liverpool
	Vernon 10', 75'; Stevens 12'			Stadium: Goodison Park; Attendance: 42,017

1 December 1962 20	Tottenham	0-0	Everton	Tottenham, Middx
				Stadium: White Hart Lane; Attendance: 60,626

8 December 1962 21	Everton	1-1	West Ham	Walton, Liverpool
	Stevens 7'		P. Brabrook 20'	Stadium: Goodison Park; Attendance: 38,701

15 December 1962 22	Everton	3-1	Burnley	Walton, Liverpool
	Stevens 18'; Vernon 20'; Young 25'		J. McIlroy 60'	Stadium: Goodison Park; Attendance: 48,443

22 December 1962 23	Sheffield Wed	2-2	Everton	Owlerton, Sheffield
	J. Quinn 20'; D. Layne 66'		D. Megson 51' (o.g.); Young 86'	Stadium: Hillsborough Stadium; Attendance: 26,280

12 February 1963 24	Leicester	3-1	Everton	Leicester
	K. Keyworth 15'; M. Stringfellow 26'; G. Cross 63'		Vernon 68'	Stadium: Filbert Street; Attendance: 35,743

23 February 1963 25	Everton	0-0	Wolves	Walton, Liverpool
				Stadium: Goodison Park; Attendance: 62,616

9 March 1963 26	Everton	2-0	Nottingham Forest	Walton, Liverpool
	Young 14'; Parker 70'			Stadium: Goodison Park; Attendance: 45,068

19 March 1963 27	Ipswich	0-3	Everton	Ipswich, Suffolk
			Young 4', 69'; J. Elsworthy 65' (o.g.)	Stadium: Portman Road; Attendance: 19,712

23 March 1963 28	Everton	2-1	Man City	Walton, Liverpool
	Young 21'; Morrissey 62'		D. Wagstaffe 15'	Stadium: Goodison Park; Attendance: 46,101

26 March 1963 29	Arsenal	4-3	Everton	Highbury, Middx
	G. Strong 9'; J. Baker 34'; J. MacLeod 46'; A. Skirton 70'		Kay 5'; Vernon 28'; Young 69'	Stadium: Arsenal Stadium; Attendance: 38,061

30 March 1963 30	Sheffield Utd	2-1	Everton	Sheffield, Yorkshire
	L. Allchurch 71'; B. Hodgson 80'		Scott 87'	Stadium: Bramall Lane; Attendance: 21,839

1 April 1963 31	Aston Villa	0-2	Everton	Aston, Birmingham
			Young 48'; Gabriel 89'	Stadium: Villa Park; Attendance: 31,377

6 April 1963 32	Everton	0-0	Blackburn	Walton, Liverpool
				Stadium: Goodison Park; Attendance: 39,790

8 April 1963 33	Liverpool	0-0	Everton	Anfield, Liverpool
				Stadium: Anfield; Attendance: 56,060

13 April 1963 34	Blackpool	1-2	Everton	Blackpool, Lancs.
	P. Quinn 89'		Young 6'; Scott 44'	Stadium: Bloomfield Road; Attendance: 27,842

15 April 1963 35	Everton	2-2	Birmingham	Walton, Liverpool
	Young 27'; Scott 77'		J. Bloomfield 44'; K. Leek 68'	Stadium: Goodison Park; Attendance: 50,122

16 April 1963 36	Birmingham	0-1	Everton	Bordesley, Birmingham
			Vernon 80'	Stadium: St Andrew's; Attendance: 29,719

20 April 1963 37	Everton	1-0	Tottenham	Walton, Liverpool
	Young 17'			Stadium: Goodison Park; Attendance: 67,650

24 April 1963 38	Everton	1-1	Arsenal	Walton, Liverpool
	Vernon 8'		G. Strong 39'	Stadium: Goodison Park; Attendance: 56,034

27 April 1963 39	West Ham	1-2	Everton	Upton Park, Essex
	M. Meagan 20' (o.g.)		Vernon 32'; Temple 43'	Stadium: Boleyn Ground; Attendance: 28,391

4 May 1963 40	Everton	1-0	Bolton	Walton, Liverpool
	Vernon 72'			Stadium: Goodison Park; Attendance: 52,047

7 May 1963 41	West Brom	0-4	Everton	West Bromwich
			Young 37', 58'; Vernon 69' (pen.); G. Williams 85' (o.g.)	Stadium: The Hawthorns; Attendance: 25,280

11 May 1963 42	Everton	4-1	Fulham	Walton, Liverpool
	Vernon 5', 8', 83'; Scott 28'		J. Key 20'	Stadium: Goodison Park; Attendance: 60,578

=== FA Cup ===
15 January 1963 3rd	Barnsley	0–3	Everton	Barnsley, Yorkshire
			Harris 72'; Stevens 76'; Vernon 85'	Stadium: Oakwell; Attendance: 30,011

29 January 1963 4th	Swindon	1–5	Everton	Swindon, Wiltshire
	J. Smith 71'		Vernon 15', 70'; Gabriel 16'; Bingham 30'; Morrissey 37'	Stadium: County Ground; Attendance: 25,239

16 March 1963 5th	West Ham	1–0	Everton	Upton Park, Essex
	J. Byrne 58' (pen.)			Stadium: Boleyn Ground; Attendance: 31,770

=== Inter-Cities Fairs Cup ===
24 October 1962 1, 1st leg	Everton (England)	1-0	(Scotland) Dunfermline	Walton, Liverpool
	Stevens 25'			Stadium: Goodison Park; Attendance: 40,224

31 October 1962 1, 2nd leg	Dunfermline (Scotland)	2–0 (2-1 agg.)	(England) Everton	Dunfermline, Scotland
	Miller 5'; Melrose 87'			Stadium: East End Park; Attendance: 21,813
