= 1960–61 Everton F.C. season =

English football club season

Everton
1960–61 season
- Chairman: John Moores
- Manager: Johnny Carey (until 15 April 1961); Harry Catterick (from 17 April 1961)
- First Division: 5th
- FA Cup: Third round
- League Cup: Quarter Final
- Top goalscorer: League: Roy Vernon (21); All: Roy Vernon (22)
- Average home league attendance: 43,448

During the 1960–61 English football season, Everton F.C. competed in the Football League First Division.

== Season summary ==
In the 1960–61 season, the Toffees finished in 5th place, their highest post-war position but despite that, Johnny Carey was infamously sacked in the back of a taxi by director John Moores. As a result, the infamous fans jibe, 'Taxi for xxxxxx!' has become a staple insult offered to any manager facing the threat of the sack. Carey was then replaced, two days later by Harry Catterick.

== Final league table ==
Pos	Team	Pld	W	D	L	GF	GA	GAv	Pts	Qualification or relegation
3	Wolverhampton Wanderers	42	25	7	10	103	75	1.373	57	
4	Burnley	42	22	7	13	102	77	1.325	51	
5	Everton	42	22	6	14	87	69	1.261	50	
6	Leicester City	42	18	9	15	87	70	1.243	45	Qualification for the European Cup Winners' Cup preliminary round (Note: Leicester City qualified for the Cup Winners' Cup preliminary round as the 1960–61 FA Cup runners-up, since the winners, Tottenham Hotspur, had already qualified for the European Cup.)
7	Manchester United	42	18	9	15	88	76	1.158	45	

Source: World Football
Rules for classification: 1) Points; 2) Goal average; 3) Goals scored

== Results ==
Everton's score comes first

=== Legend ===
Win	Draw	Loss

=== Football League First Division ===
Date	Opponent	Venue	Result	Attendance	Scorers
20 August 1960	Tottenham Hotspur	A	0–2	50,393	
24 August 1960	Manchester United	H	4–0	51,602	Collins (2), Lill (2)
27 August 1960	Leicester City	H	3–1	45,215	Ring (2), Collins
31 August 1960	Manchester United	A	0–4	51,915	
3 September 1960	Aston Villa	A	2–3	32,864	Temple, Vernon
5 September 1960	Blackpool	A	4–1	24,945	Collins, J Harris, Temple, Vernon
10 September 1960	Wolverhampton Wanderers	H	3–1	53,728	Vernon (2), J Harris
14 September 1960	Blackpool	H	1–0	46,943	Lill
17 September 1960	Bolton Wanderers	A	4–3	30,405	Lill (2), Collins, Vernon
24 September 1960	West Ham United	H	4–1	46,291	Vernon (2), Lill, Ring
1 October 1960	Chelsea	A	3–3	31,457	Collins, Lill, Ring
8 October 1960	Preston North End	H	0–0	36,717	
15 October 1960	Fulham	A	3–2	30,603	J Harris (2), Vernon
24 October 1960	Manchester City	H	4–2	53,781	Vernon (2), Collins (pen), Temple
29 October 1960	Nottingham Forest	A	2–1	20,720	Bingham, B Harris
5 November 1960	West Bromwich Albion	H	1–1	40,705	Kennedy (own goal)
12 November 1960	Cardiff City	A	1–1	19,234	Bingham
19 November 1960	Newcastle United	H	5–0	41,123	Collins (3), Vernon, Wignall
26 November 1960	Arsenal	A	2–3	36,709	Collins (pen), Vernon
3 December 1960	Sheffield Wednesday	H	4–2	25,658	Vernon (2, 1 pen), J Harris, Johnson (own goal)
10 December 1960	Birmingham City	A	4–2	27,717	Wignall (2), Bingham, Tyrer
17 December 1960	Tottenham Hotspur	H	1–3	61,052	Wignall
26 December 1960	Burnley	A	3–1	44,232	Bingham, Collins (pen), B Harris
27 December 1960	Burnley	H	0–3	74,867	
31 December 1960	Leicester City	A	1–4	23,495	B Harris
21 January 1961	Wolverhampton Wanderers	A	1–4	31,119	Bingham
4 February 1961	Bolton Wanderers	H	1–2	35,654	Collins
11 February 1961	West Ham United	A	0–4	22,322	
18 February 1961	Chelsea	H	1–1	34,449	Vernon
25 February 1961	Preston North End	A	0–1	17,812	
4 March 1961	Fulham	H	1–0	35,840	Gabriel
11 March 1961	Manchester City	A	1–2	29,751	Vernon
18 March 1961	Nottingham Forest	H	1–0	27,579	Bingham
22 March 1961	Aston Villa	H	1–2	28,115	Wignall
25 March 1961	West Bromwich Albion	A	0–3	20,590	
31 March 1961	Blackburn Rovers	A	3–1	24,982	Young (2), Vernon
1 April 1961	Birmingham City	H	1–0	31,872	Temple
3 April 1961	Blackburn Rovers	H	2–2	41,991	Bingham, Young
8 April 1961	Newcastle United	A	4–0	30,342	Bingham (2), Vernon, Wignall
15 April 1961	Cardiff City	H	5–1	34,382	Collins (3, 1 pen), Young (2)
22 April 1961	Sheffield Wednesday	A	2–1	26,601	Wignall (2)
29 April 1961	Arsenal	H	4–1	39,810	Vernon (3, 1 pen), Young

=== FA Cup ===
Round	Date	Opponent	Venue	Result	Attendance	Goalscorers
R3	7 January 1961	Sheffield United	H	0–1	48,895	

=== League Cup ===
Round	Date	Opponent	Venue	Result	Attendance	Goalscorers
R1	12 October 1960	Accrington Stanley	H	3–1	18,246	Wignall (2), J Harris
R2	31 October 1960	Walsall	H	3–1	14,137	Collins, Vernon, Webber
R3	23 November 1960	Bury	H	3–1	20,724	Wignall (2), J Harris
R4	21 December 1960	Tranmere Rovers	A	4–0	14,967	Wignall (3), Bingham
QF	15 February 1961	Shrewsbury Town	A	1–2	15,399	Young

== Squad ==
Note: Flags indicate national team as defined under FIFA eligibility rules; some limited exceptions apply. Players may hold more than one non-FIFA nationality.

Pos.	Nation	Player
GK	ENG	Albert Dunlop
DF	SCO	Alex Parker
DF	ENG	Brian Labone
DF	ENG	Tommy Jones
DF	SCO	George Thomson
MF	SCO	Bobby Collins
MF	SCO	Jimmy Gabriel
MF	ENG	Brian Harris
FW	WAL	Roy Vernon
FW	ENG	Derek Temple
MF	NIR	Billy Bingham
FW	ENG	Jimmy Harris
FW	ENG	Frank Wignall

Pos.	Nation	Player
FW	SCO	Alex Young
DF	IRL	Mick Meagan
MF	SCO	Tommy Ring
MF	ENG	Mickey Lill
DF	WAL	Colin Green
MF	ENG	Jimmy Fell
MF	ENG	Peter Kavanagh
MF	ENG	George Sharples
MF	ENG	Alan Tyrer
FW	WAL	Keith Webber
MF	ENG	Jack Bentley
DF	ENG	Roy Parnell
