= Dixie Dean =

English footballer (1907–1980)

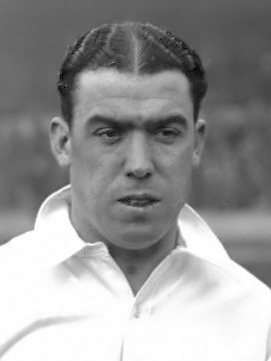
- Dean in 1931 during his tenure with Everton

Personal information
- Full name: William Ralph Dean
- Date of birth: 22 January 1907
- Place of birth: Birkenhead, England
- Date of death: 1 March 1980 (aged 73)
- Place of death: Goodison Park, Liverpool, England
- Height: 5 ft 10 in (1.78 m)
- Position: Centre forward

Senior career*
Years	Team	Apps	(Gls)
1923–1925	Tranmere Rovers	30	(27)
1925–1937	Everton	399	(349)
1938–1939	Notts County	9	(3)
1939	Sligo Rovers	7	(10)
1940	Hurst	2	(1)
Total		447	(390)

International career
1927–1932	England	16	(18)
- * Club domestic league appearances and goals

William Ralph "Dixie" Dean (22 January 1907 – 1 March 1980) was an English footballer who played as a centre forward. Dean holds the long-standing record for the most goals scored in a single season in top-flight English football, with 60 league goals in the 1927/28 season alone. He is regarded as one of the greatest centre-forwards of all time and was inducted into the English Football Hall of Fame in 2002.

Born in Birkenhead, he began his career at his hometown club Tranmere Rovers, before moving on to Everton, the club he had supported as a child. A prolific goalscorer, he was particularly known for having a penchant for scoring goals with his head, courtesy of his elevation and athleticism, as well as his powerful and accurate heading ability, which has led pundits to describe him as one of the greatest aerial specialists of all time. Dean played the majority of his career at Everton, before injuries caught up with him and he moved on to new challenges at Notts County, and eventually Sligo Rovers.

In Everton's league championship-winning season of 1927–28, Dean scored a record 60 league goals (out of the team's 102), having played in 39 of Everton's 42 games. That season, he also made his debut for England: he went on to score eighteen goals in sixteen appearances for his country.

A statue of Dean was unveiled outside Goodison Park in May 2001. A year later, he became one of 22 players inducted into the inaugural English Football Hall of Fame.

The Dixie Dean Hotel Liverpool opened in July 2019 was named after the football player. It is located within the Grade II listed building of the Jerome & Carlisle Buildings.

== Early years ==
Dean was born at 313 Laird Street in Birkenhead, Cheshire, across the River Mersey from Liverpool. Dean's family on both sides hailed from Chester. He was the grandson of Ralph Brett, a train driver who drove the royal train during the reign of George V. Dean grew up as a supporter of Everton thanks to the efforts of his father, also named William, who took him to a match during the 1914–15 title-winning season.

Dean's childhood coincided with the First World War, and between the ages of seven and eleven he delivered cow's milk to local families as part of the war effort: "Well, it was war time you see, so you were grafting all the time. I used to take milk out. I'd be up at half-past four in the morning and go down and get the ponies and the milk floats, then I'd come out to this place in Upton, between Upton and Arrowe Park, and Burgess' Farm was there. We used to collect the milk in the big urns and take it out to people's houses, serving it out of the ladle. And not only that, you had an allotment, and that was in school time. And there was no such thing as pinching and stealing and all that bloody caper. In those days, you were growing all that stuff and you needed it for the war time."

Dean attended Laird Street School but felt he received no formal education: "My only lesson was football ... I used to give the pens out on Friday afternoons ... the ink, and the chalks. That was the only job I had in school ... I never had any lessons." When he turned eleven, he attended Albert (Memorial) Industrial School, a borstal school in Birkenhead, because of the football facilities on offer. The Dean family home had little room for him due to the family's size; Dean was happy with the arrangement, since he could play on the school's football team. Dean falsely told fellow pupils he had been caught stealing, since he wanted to be "one of the boys".

He left school at fourteen and worked for Wirral Railway as an apprentice fitter; his father also worked there and had been working since he was eleven years old for Great Western Railway. The elder Dean later became a train driver before moving to Birkenhead to work for Wirral Railway, to be closer to his future wife (and William Jr's mother) Sarah. Dean's father would later retire with the company.

Dean took a night job so that he could concentrate on his first love, football: "The other two apprentice fitters, they didn't like the night job because there were too many bloody rats around there, coming out of the Anglo-Oil company and the Vacuum Oil Company ... rats as big as whippets. So I took their night job, and of course, I could always have a game of football then." Dean would kick the trespassing rats against the wall.

The sons of Dean's manager at Wirral Railway were directors of New Brighton, and they were interested in signing Dean. However, Dean told the club he was not interested in signing and instead played for local team Pensby United in Pensby. It was at Pensby United where Dean attracted the attention of a Tranmere Rovers scout.

=== "Dixie" nickname ===
Some said that Dean and his family disliked his nickname, and preferred people to call him "Bill" or "Billy". The popular theory regarding how Dean acquired his nickname is that he did so in his youth, perhaps due to his dark complexion and hair (which bore a resemblance to people from the Southern United States). In Dean's obituary in The Times, Geoffrey Green suggested that the nickname was taken from a "Dixie" song that was popular during Dean's childhood; there was "something of the Uncle Tom about his features".

Alternatively, Tranmere Rovers club historian Gilbert Upton uncovered evidence, verified by Dean's godmother, that the name "Dixie" was a corruption of his childhood nickname, Digsy (acquired from his approach to the children's game of tag, where Dean would dig his fist into a girl's back, hence "Digsy").

== Club career ==
=== Tranmere Rovers ===
He played football for Laird Street School, Moreton Bible Class, Heswall and Pensby United. He then joined the professional ranks with his local club, Tranmere Rovers in November 1923. He was sixteen at the time.

Whilst at Tranmere, he was on the receiving end of a tough challenge which resulted in him losing a testicle in a reserve game against Altrincham. Immediately following the challenge, a teammate rubbed the area to ease the pain. Dean shouted, "Don't rub 'em, count 'em!"

In his sixteen months at Tranmere, spanning the 1923–24 and 1924–25 seasons, he scored 27 goals in 30 league appearances. All 27 were in the second of those two seasons, in which he averaged exactly a goal per game. His exploits attracted the interest of many clubs across England, including Arsenal and Newcastle United. Upon leaving Tranmere Rovers, manager Bert Cooke reneged on an agreement to pay ten percent of the transfer fee to Dean. Dean was paid one percent of the fee, which he gave to his parents (who donated it to Birkenhead General Hospital).

=== Everton ===
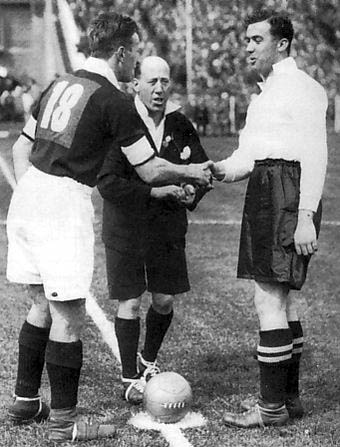
Dean (right) shaking hands with Manchester City captain Sam Cowan before the 1933 FA Cup final

His father had taken him to a league game at Goodison Park when he was eight years old. It was a dream come true for Dean, when Everton secretary Thomas H. McIntosh arranged to meet him at the Woodside Hotel in 1925. Dean was so excited that he ran the 2.5 miles (4.0 km) distance from his home in north Birkenhead to the riverside to meet him. He signed for Everton in March 1925, having just turned eighteen.

He later revealed that he expected a £300 signing fee to be given to his parents when he transferred to Everton. They received only £30, and Tranmere Rovers manager Bert Cooke told him "That's all the League will allow". Dean appealed to John McKenna, vice-chairman of the Football Association, but was told "I'm afraid you've signed, and that's it." Dean signed for Everton in March 1925 for £3,000, then a record fee received for any Third Division player, any 18-year old, and any Tranmere Rovers player. He made his debut away to Arsenal, and scored his first Everton goal later that month, at home to Aston Villa. He scored 32 goals in his first full season, 1925–26, benefiting from a change to the offside law. A motorcycling accident at Holywell in north Wales in summer 1926 left Dean with a fractured skull and jaw, and doctors were unsure whether he would be able to play again. In his next game for Everton, he scored using his head, leading Evertonians to joke that the doctor left a metal plate in Dean's head. He re-joined the first team in October 1926, scoring in his first game back, away to Leeds United. Dean finished the 1926–27 season with 21 goals from 27 games as Everton avoided relegation by a single place.

Dean's greatest point of note is that he is still the only player in English football to score 60 league goals in one season (1927–28). At that season's end he was 21 years old. Middlesbrough's George Camsell, who holds the highest goals-to-games ratio for England, had scored 59 league goals the previous season, although this was in the Second Division.

In that 1927–28 season, Everton won the First Division title. When they were relegated to the Second Division in 1930, Dean stayed with them. The club went on to immediately win the Second Division in 1931, followed by the First Division again in 1932. They then won the FA Cup in 1933 (in which he scored in the final) – a sequence unmatched since.

In December 1933, Dean issued a public appeal to have stolen goods returned to him. The Times issued a statement: "Dixie Dean, the Everton and England forward appeals to the thief who robbed him of an international cap and presentation clock to return them. His house in Caldy Road, Walton, Liverpool was entered in his absence over Christmas, and the thief left behind gold watches and jewellery (sic)." By then, Dean was captain of the side. However, the harsh physical demands of the game (as it was played then) took their toll and he was dropped from the first team in 1937.

Dean's 310 First Division goals for Everton remain as the record for most goals for a single club in English football's top tier.

=== Later career ===
Dean went on to play for Notts County for one season, in which he scored three goals in nine games. At age 32, Dean signed for Irish club Sligo Rovers in January 1939 to help the club in their FAI Cup campaign. On his arrival, the railway station in Sligo was said to be filled with locals trying to catch a glimpse of him. Dean scored ten goals in seven games for the club, including five in a 7–1 win over Waterford (which remains a club record for the most goals scored in a single game). He also played in four Cup matches, scoring once (in the 1–1 final against Shelbourne, who won the replay 1–0). Dean's runner-up medal was later stolen from his hotel room; on a return trip to Ireland to watch Rovers 39 years later in the 1978 FAI Cup final, a package was delivered to his hotel room with the medal inside. He is considered a legend at The Showgrounds and is featured in the club's outdoor museum.

Dean ended his professional playing days with Cheshire County League club Hurst (now Ashton United) in the 1939–40 season, managing two games and one goal before the outbreak of war ended his career. He made his debut in a 4–0 loss to Stalybridge Celtic; 5,600 people attended the game, paying sixpence, earning the club gate receipts of £140.

== International career ==
Dean made his debut for the England national football team against British rivals Wales at the Racecourse Ground in Wrexham in February 1927, less than a month after his 20th birthday. His final game for England came in a 1–0 victory over Ireland in October 1932 at Blackpool's Bloomfield Road, when Dean was 25 years old.

Dean was involved in the 1927 and 1929 editions of the British Home Championship. During the 1927 edition, Dean scored four goals in his two games for England and scored twice against Scotland at Hampden Park. Despite the loss, the Scots won the competition overall and applauded Dean (who finished the tournament as top scorer). In the 1929 edition, he scored in his only outing against Ireland at Goodison Park.

The only international competitions outside the British Home Championship during Dean's international career were the 1928 and 1936 Olympic Games and the inaugural FIFA World Cup, which took place in 1930; however, neither Great Britain nor England participated. Dean represented England sixteen times, scoring eighteen goals in nine games (including hat-tricks against Belgium and Luxembourg).

== Later life and death ==
Dean became a Freemason in 1931 while playing for Everton and England. He was initiated in Randle Holme Lodge, No. 3261, in Birkenhead on 18 February 1931. After retiring, he went on to run the Dublin Packet pub in Chester (Everton and the Dublin Packet commemorate this with memorabilia) and work at Littlewoods football pools as a porter at their Walton Hall Avenue offices, where he was remembered by fellow workers as a quiet, unassuming man.

In January 1972, Dean was admitted to St Catherine's hospital in Birkenhead suffering from the effects of influenza and was released a month later. In November 1976, he had his right leg amputated due to a blood clot; his health was declining, and he became increasingly housebound. Dean died on 1 March 1980 at age 73, after suffering a heart attack at Everton's home ground Goodison Park, whilst watching a match against their closest rivals, Liverpool. It was the first time that he had visited Goodison Park in several years, due to ill health. "He belongs to the company of the supremely great, like Beethoven, Shakespeare and Rembrandt", said Bill Shankly. His funeral took place at St James' Church on Laird Street (the street where he was born) in Birkenhead. He was survived by his four children: William, Geoffrey, Ralph and Barbara; he outlived his wife Ethel, who died of a heart attack in 1974 after 43 years of marriage.

== Legacy ==
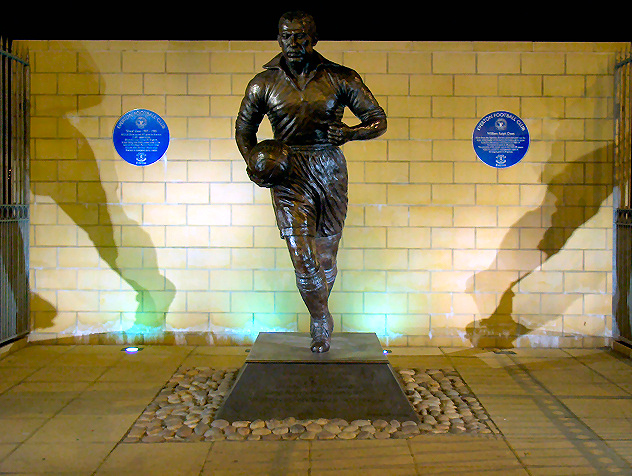
Dixie Dean statue outside Goodison Park

Dean was an internationally known figure. Military records show that during the Second World War, an Italian prisoner of war was captured by British troops in the Western Desert and told his captors "fuck your Winston Churchill and fuck your Dixie Dean". One of the soldiers present was Liverpool-born Patrick Connelly, who later went into show business using the pseudonym "Bill Dean".

Everton arranged a testimonial for Dean on 7 April 1964. Over 34,000 people saw teams from Scotland and England, composed of players from Everton and Liverpool, compete; The "Scots", with one Englishman and one Welshman, won 3–1.

The match raised £7,000 for Dean.

Testimonial team squads
England	Scotland
Rankin	Lawrence
Byrne	Brown
Moran	Thompson (Eng)
Harris	Gabriel
Labone	Yeats
Kay	Stevenson
Callaghan	Scott
Stevens	St. John
Pickering	Young
Temple	Vernon (Wal)
Morrissey	Wallace

Dean's 1933 FA Cup winner's medal sold for £18,213 at auction in March 2001. In May 2001 local sculptor Tom Murphy created a statue of Dean, which was erected outside the Park End of Goodison Park at a cost of £75,000 with the inscription "Footballer, Gentleman, Evertonian". In 2002, Dean was an inaugural inductee to the English Football Hall of Fame. There is an annual Dixie Dean award, which is given to the Merseyside player of the year; it has been won by players from his former clubs (Tranmere and Everton) and Liverpool.

When asked if he thought his record of scoring 60 goals in a season would be broken, Dean said: "I think it will. But there's only one man who'll do it. That's the fellow that walks on the water. I think he's about the only one." In total, Dean scored 383 goals for Everton in 433 appearances – an exceptional strike-rate which includes 37 hat-tricks, 30 in league matches. He was known as a sporting player, never booked or sent off during his career despite rough treatment and provocation from opponents. Only Arthur Rowley has scored more English-league career goals; however, while Rowley made 619 appearances and scored 433 goals (0.70 goals per game), Dean scored 379 goals in 438 games (0.87 goals per game).

In December 1930 and again in October 1931, Dean became the first Everton player to score two hat-tricks in one month of competitive play. His record would not be equalled for nearly ninety years (Dominic Calvert-Lewin did so in September 2020).

== Career statistics ==
Dean at Goodison Park while playing for Everton

=== Club ===
Appearances and goals by club, season and competition
Club	Season	League			FA Cup		Charity Shield		Total	
Club	Season	Division	Apps	Goals	Apps	Goals	Apps	Goals	Apps	Goals
Tranmere Rovers	1923–24	Third Division	3	0	0	0	0	0	3	0
Tranmere Rovers	1924–25	Third Division	27	27	3	0	0	0	30	27
Tranmere Rovers	Total		30	27	3	0	0	0	33	27
Everton	1924–25	First Division	7	2	0	0	0	0	7	2
Everton	1925–26	First Division	38	32	2	1	0	0	40	33
Everton	1926–27	First Division	27	21	4	3	0	0	31	24
Everton	1927–28	First Division	39	60	2	3	0	0	41	63
Everton	1928–29	First Division	29	26	1	0	1	2	31	28
Everton	1929–30	First Division	25	23	2	2	0	0	27	25
Everton	1930–31	Second Division	37	39	5	9	0	0	42	48
Everton	1931–32	First Division	38	45	1	1	0	0	39	46
Everton	1932–33	First Division	39	24	6	5	1	4	46	33
Everton	1933–34	First Division	12	9	0	0	0	0	12	9
Everton	1934–35	First Division	38	26	5	1	0	0	43	27
Everton	1935–36	First Division	29	17	0	0	0	0	29	17
Everton	1936–37	First Division	36	24	4	3	0	0	40	27
Everton	1937–38	First Division	5	1	0	0	0	0	5	1
Everton	Total		399	349	32	28	2	6	433	383
Notts County	1937–38	Third Division	3	0	0	0	0	0	3	0
Notts County	1938–39	Third Division	6	3	0	0	0	0	6	3
Notts County	Total		9	3	0	0	0	0	9	3
Sligo Rovers	1938–39	League of Ireland	7	10	4	1	0	0	11	11
Hurst	1939–40	Cheshire County League	2	1	0	0	0	0	2	1
Career total			447	390	39	29	2	6	488	425

=== International ===
Appearances and goals by national team and year
National team	Year	Apps	Goals
England	1927	7	12
England	1928	5	5
England	1929	1	0
England	1930	–	–
England	1931	2	1
England	1932	1	0
Total		16	18

Scores and results list England's goal tally first, score column indicates score after each Dean goal.

List of international goals scored by Dixie Dean
No.	Date	Venue	Opponent	Score	Result	Competition	Ref.
1	12 February 1927	Racecourse Ground, Wrexham, Wales	Wales	1–0	3–3	1926–27 Home Championship	
2	12 February 1927	Racecourse Ground, Wrexham, Wales	Wales	3–3	3–3	1926–27 Home Championship	
3	2 April 1927	Hampden Park, Glasgow, Scotland	Scotland	1–1	2–1	1926–27 Home Championship	
4	2 April 1927	Hampden Park, Glasgow, Scotland	Scotland	2–1	2–1	1926–27 Home Championship	
5	11 May 1927	Stade du Daring Club de Bruxelles, Molenbeek, Belgium	Belgium	5–0	9–1	Friendly	
6	11 May 1927	Stade du Daring Club de Bruxelles, Molenbeek, Belgium	Belgium	6–0	9–1	Friendly	
7	11 May 1927	Stade du Daring Club de Bruxelles, Molenbeek, Belgium	Belgium	9–0	9–1	Friendly	
8	21 May 1927	Stade de la Frontière, Esch-sur-Alzette, Luxembourg	Luxembourg	1–2	5–2	Friendly	
9	21 May 1927	Stade de la Frontière, Esch-sur-Alzette, Luxembourg	Luxembourg	3–2	5–2	Friendly	
10	21 May 1927	Stade de la Frontière, Esch-sur-Alzette, Luxembourg	Luxembourg	4–2	5–2	Friendly	
11	26 May 1927	Stade Olympique Yves-du-Manoir, Colombes, France	France	2–0	6–0	Friendly	
12	26 May 1927	Stade Olympique Yves-du-Manoir, Colombes, France	France	5–0	6–0	Friendly	
13	17 May 1928	Stade Olympique Yves-du-Manoir, Colombes, France	France	3–1	5–1	Friendly	
14	17 May 1928	Stade Olympique Yves-du-Manoir, Colombes, France	France	4–1	5–1	Friendly	
15	19 May 1928	Olympisch Stadion, Antwerp, Belgium	Belgium	1–1	3–1	Friendly	
16	19 May 1928	Olympisch Stadion, Antwerp, Belgium	Belgium	2–1	3–1	Friendly	
17	22 October 1928	Goodison Park, Liverpool, England	Ireland	2–1	2–1	1928–29 Home Championship	
18	9 December 1931	Arsenal Stadium, London, England	Spain	5–0	7–1	Friendly	

== Honours ==
Everton

- Football League First Division: 1927–28, 1931–32
- Football League Second Division: 1930–31
- FA Cup: 1932–33
- FA Charity Shield: 1928, 1932

Sligo Rovers

- League of Ireland runner-up: 1938–39
- FAI Cup runner-up: 1938–39

England

- British Home Championship: 1926–27 (shared), 1931–32 (shared)

Individual

- English Top Division Golden Boot: 1927–28, 1931–32
- Second Division Championship: Top Goalscorer, 1930–31
- Sunday Pictorial Trophy (60 league goals in 1927–28)
- Lewis's Medal (Commemorate 200 league goals in 199 appearances)
- Hall of Fame Trophy (1971)
- Football Writers' Association inscribed silver salver (1976)
- English Football Hall of Fame (Inaugural inductee, 2002)
- Most goals in an English top-flight season: 60 (1927–28)
- Seasonwise World Top Scorer: 1927–28 (60 goals)

== See also ==
- List of English football first tier top scorers
- List of men's footballers with 500 or more goals

== Sources ==
- Keith, John (2003). Dixie Dean: The Inside Story of a Football Icon. Robson Books. ISBN 978-1-86105-632-0.
- Upton, Gilbert (1992). Dixie Dean of Tranmere Rovers 1923–1925. Gilbert Upton. ISBN 978-0-9518648-1-4.
- Winner, David (2005). Those Feet: A Sensual History of English Football. London: Bloomsbury. ISBN 978-0-7475-7914-4.
- Walsh, Nick (1978). Dixie Dean: The Official Biography of a Goalscoring Legend. Macmillan. ISBN 978-0-330-25619-3.
- Young, Percy M. (1963). Football on Merseyside. London.
