= Billy Bingham =

Irish footballer and manager (1931–2022)

Billy Bingham MBE
Personal information
- Full name: William Laurence Bingham
- Date of birth: 5 August 1931
- Place of birth: Belfast, Northern Ireland
- Date of death: 9 June 2022 (aged 90)
- Place of death: Southport, England
- Height: 5 ft 7 in (1.70 m)
- Position: Outside right

Youth career
- St Donard's Youth Club
- 1947–1948: Glentoran

Senior career*
Years	Team	Apps	(Gls)
1948–1950	Glentoran	60	(21)
1950–1958	Sunderland	206	(45)
1958–1960	Luton Town	87	(27)
1960–1963	Everton	86	(23)
1963–1965	Port Vale	40	(6)
Total		479	(122)

International career
1950	Irish League XI	2	(0)
1951–1963	Northern Ireland	56	(8)

Managerial career
- 1965–1968: Southport
- 1967–1971: Northern Ireland
- 1968–1970: Plymouth Argyle
- 1970–1971: Linfield
- 1971–1973: Greece
- 1973: AEK Athens
- 1973–1977: Everton
- 1977: PAOK
- 1978–1979: Mansfield Town
- 1980–1993: Northern Ireland
- 1987–1988: Al-Nassr
- * Club domestic league appearances and goals

William Laurence Bingham MBE (5 August 1931 – 9 June 2022) was a Northern Irish football player and manager.

As a player, his first professional club was Glentoran, for whom he played between 1948 and 1950. Making a move to England, he then spent eight years with Sunderland, making 227 appearances. In 1958, he switched to Luton Town, making nearly 100 league appearances in three years. This was followed by a two-year association with Everton, where he again went close to 100 league appearances. He finished his career after breaking his leg in a match for Port Vale in 1964 at 33. He had scored 133 goals in 525 appearances in all domestic competitions. Between 1951 and 1963, he won 56 caps for Northern Ireland, scoring 10 international goals, and played at the 1958 FIFA World Cup.

His managerial career started at Southport in 1965. He was appointed manager of Northern Ireland two years later after taking the "Sandgrounders" to promotion out of the Fourth Division. During his time as an international manager, he also took charge at Plymouth Argyle and later Linfield. He led Linfield to a quadruple in 1970–71, his only season in charge. In 1971, he was appointed the head coach of the Greece national side. Two years later, he returned to the domestic game with Everton of England. He returned to Greece briefly in 1977, taking the reins at PAOK. The following year, he returned to England to take charge of Mansfield Town for one full season. In 1980, he was re-appointed as Northern Ireland manager, his final position and a post he would hold for the next 13 years. He led his nation to the finals of the FIFA World Cup in 1982 and 1986.

== Club career ==
=== Glentoran ===
Bingham attended Elmgrove Elementary School and was captain of the school's football team, also being selected for Northern Ireland schoolboy games. Born in the Bloomfield area of Belfast, he grew up alongside Jackie and Danny Blanchflower. His father worked at the local shipyards. He began his career with Glentoran on £6-a-week. He made his senior debut on 12 March 1949, in a 1–1 draw with Ballymena United. The "Glens" finished second in the Irish League in 1949–50. While with Glentoran, Bingham also made two appearances for the Irish League representative team. He said that playing against experienced full-back Sammy Cox of the Scottish League XI gave him "my first real practical football lesson".

"Not a natural wing talent like a Tommy Lawton, Stanley Matthews or Tom Finney, Billy Bingham had realised shortly after his arrival in English football that he would have to work hard, at both the practical and theoretical side of the game. He developed pace, strength and control to enable him to beat full-backs and deliver incisive balls into the box. He worked on his shooting from range, and his touch within the six-yard box to enable him to effectively poach goals. Above all he was brave enough to take the knocks that were inevitable with his small frame."

— Analysis of Bingham's game from the nifootball.blogspot.co.uk website.

=== Sunderland ===
Bingham joined Sunderland in October 1950 for £10,000. He was first informed of the move by football writer Charlie Buchan, who shook his hand and said "congratulations, you've been transferred to Sunderland". In addition to playing professional football at Roker Park, Bingham continued his shipbuilding apprenticeship on the Sunderland shipyards. His speed and ball-control made him a popular player with the "Black Cats", and he gradually worked his way into Bill Murray's first-team plans in 1950–51. He initially was behind Len Duns and Tommy Wright in the pecking order, despite Sunderland's transfer outlay on him as the beginnings of their "Bank of England" team, and he played for the reserves in the North Eastern League. Wright suffered a drop in form, leaving Bingham to make his debut against Stoke City in December. He trained hard and also utilised weight training to improve his strength and compensate for his undersized frame. Wright then suffered a serious injury in March, leaving Bingham to take his place for the remainder of the 1950–51 season.

He played in all but six games of the 1951–52 campaign as Wright recovered from his injury, with the Black Cats labouring to a 12th-place finish. He lost his place to the returning Wright in the 1952–53 season. He made just 19 appearances in 1953–54, as Wright continued to hold on to his first-team place. Bingham regained his place in 1954–55, scoring ten goals in 42 games, as Sunderland finished fourth in the First Division, four points behind champions Chelsea. His scoring tally included two consecutive braces in victories over Charlton Athletic and Tyne–Wear derby rivals Newcastle United. They also reached the FA Cup semi-finals, where they lost to Manchester City on a quagmire of a pitch at Villa Park. They slipped to ninth in 1955–56, and again exited the FA Cup at the semi-finals, this time losing 3–0 to Birmingham City. The club were heavily punished for making illegal payments to players, and Bingham himself was one of 15 players that had to forfeit six months' qualification for benefit for receiving these payments. The punishment to the players was later recinded.

The 1956–57 campaign started poorly, and Bingham was dropped in October; he put in a transfer request, which was turned down. The club later informed him that Manchester City had expressed an interest, though he rebuffed their advances. New boss Alan Brown signed outside-right Amby Fogarty from Glentoran, and led the club to relegation in 1957–58. Out of the first-team, Bingham fell out with Brown, and left the club in the summer on a £8,000 transfer to top-flight Luton Town. In total he made 227 appearances and scored 47 goals during his time in the North East.

=== Luton Town ===
Bingham had been Luton's second-choice in the transfer market as Aberdeen winger Graham Leggat had instead gone to Fulham. Manager Dally Duncan had limited control of the team. Bingham believed that team captain Syd Owen had greater influence on the board of directors, and indeed Owen was put in charge of the first team after Duncan left Kenilworth Road in October. The "Hatters" finished 17th in the league in 1958–59, but reached the 1959 FA Cup final after Bingham scored the winning goal in the semi-final replay against Norwich City at St Andrew's. Bingham had scored in all the previous rounds as well as Luton had overcome Leeds United, Leicester City (after a replay), Ipswich Town, and Blackpool. In the Wembley final, his corner set up Dave Pacey for Luton's consolation in a 2–1 defeat to Nottingham Forest.

Despite Bingham scoring 16 league goals to become the club's top scorer, Luton were relegated in 1959–60. New manager Sam Bartram failed to keep Bingham for long, and after three goals in 11 Second Division games, including a 35-yard volley against Liverpool at Anfield, he soon attracted offers from Tottenham Hotspur and Arsenal. He wanted his contract improved to the level of new signing Joe McBride, though had to be satisfied when the board instead reduced McBride's contract to the level that the rest of the team were on.

=== Everton ===
Bingham joined Everton for a fee of £15,000 plus John Bramwell and Alex Ashworth in October 1960. He had been signed by manager Johnny Carey as outside-left Tommy Ring had broken his leg, with Mickey Lill being switched to outside-left from right-wing to accommodate. Bingham immediately formed a good understanding with Bobby Collins, though a poor start to the 1960–61 campaign left the Toffees unable to get close to runaway First Division champions Tottenham Hotspur. They exited the FA Cup at the third round, with Bingham playing poorly out-of-position on the left following injury to Lill. Carey resigned and was replaced as manager at Goodison Park by Harry Catterick.

A fourth-place finish followed in 1961–62, and the "Toffees" won the league title in 1962–63. However, Catterick signed Scotsman Alex Scott in February 1963 for £40,000, and so Bingham's days at Merseyside were numbered. He made 98 appearances and scored 26 goals at Everton.

=== Port Vale ===
Bingham joined Port Vale for a then joint-club record fee of £15,000 in August 1963. He scored seven goals in 38 appearances in 1963–64, as Freddie Steele's "Valiants" finished 13th in the Third Division. Johnny Carey, now manager at Nottingham Forest, offered £12,000 to take Bingham back into the top-flight, but he elected to remain at Vale Park. He retired from playing after breaking his leg in a 4–0 defeat at Brentford on 5 September 1964. He left for Southport on a free transfer in April 1965 to become their trainer-coach.

== International career ==
Bingham became a Northern Ireland international, winning his first cap against France as a 19-year-old on 12 May 1951. French full-back Roger Marche said at the end of his career that Bingham was the greatest forward he ever played against. Bingham was less effusive in his praise of the national team, however, stating that "we had no team-manager, no set tactics – in fact no team-plan at all". This changed with the appointment of Peter Doherty as manager, and the team went on to defeat England by three goals to two in a British Home Championship match at Wembley on 6 November 1957.

On 16 January 1957, Bingham scored his country's first goal in World Cup qualification, as they claimed a 1–1 draw away at Portugal. A subsequent defeat in Italy and home win over Portugal, left Northern Ireland needing to beat the Italians at home to win the group and qualify for the 1958 FIFA World Cup in Sweden. The originally scheduled fixture was converted into a friendly after the original referee was unable to make it, and though the friendly game was drawn 2–2, Northern Ireland won the re-arranged fixture by two goals to one.

In the tournament itself, Northern Ireland beat Czechoslovakia by one goal to nil in the opening match of Group 1, with Bingham and Wilbur Cush forming "an approximation of a double spearhead". The Swedish press wrote that "[Cush] and Billy Bingham gave an exhibition of fast, clever football never seen before at the ground." The second game was a 3–1 loss to Argentina, against whom he felt their tactics were ill-suited. They needed to beat West Germany in the final group game to ensure qualification from the group, though the ensuing 2–2 stalemate meant that a play-off match with Czechoslovakia (who had won 6–1 against Argentina) was required to decide who would follow the Germans into the knock-out phase. The game was level at 1–1 at full-time, which meant that extra-time followed, and Bingham convinced his teammates to perform calisthenics to demoralise the Czechs. Peter McParland went on to score his fifth goal of the tournament to give the Irish a 2–1 win. The World Cup jounry ended with a 4–0 defeat to France in the quarter-finals.

Qualification for the 1962 FIFA World Cup went poorly, with three defeats in the four games of the qualification group. Bingham was awarded a total of 56 full caps, a record at the time, and also scored 10 goals, half of which were scored in British Home Championship matches against Scotland. Most of his caps came alongside inside-forward partner Jimmy McIlroy, who played domestically for Burnley.

== Managerial career ==
=== Southport ===
Bingham became a coach at Southport in June 1965 and was appointed manager at the end of the year, at the expense of Willie Cunningham. He led the team to a tenth-place finish in the Fourth Division in 1965–66. In his first full season in charge, 1966–67, he led the "Sandgrounders" to promotion as runners-up – the club's first-ever promotion. He departed Haig Avenue in October 1967, with Southport in safe hands as they finished the 1967–68 Third Division campaign in 13th place under Don McEvoy's stewardship.

=== Northern Ireland, Plymouth & Linfield ===
He left Southport to take charge of the Northern Ireland national team in October 1967. The position was not a taxing one, however, and Bingham took charge at Plymouth Argyle in February 1968, replacing Derek Ufton. He was unable to steer the club away from relegation, as the "Pilgrims" finished bottom of the Second Division. He took the club to fifth in the third tier in 1968–69, some 15 points behind second-placed Swindon Town. A battle against relegation followed in 1969–70, and Bingham departed Home Park in March 1970; the club went on to finish 17th under Ellis Stuttard's stewardship. Still Northern Ireland's boss, he took charge of the country's biggest club, Linfield, in August 1970. His one season at Windsor Park was highly successful, as he led the "Blues" to the 1970–71 Irish League title, three points ahead of rivals Glentoran. The club also lifted a treble of trophies, in the form of the Ulster Cup, Gold Cup, and Blaxnit Cup. He stood down as "Norn Iron" boss in May 1971, and left Linfield as well in August. During his time as national team coach, Northern Ireland played 20 games, winning eight, drawing three and losing nine games. They had missed out on qualification to the 1970 FIFA World Cup after losing to the Soviet Union in Moscow. In the British Home Championship tournaments, they finished third in 1968–69, fourth in 1969–70, and second in 1970–71.

=== Greece ===
Bingham took charge of the Greece national side in September 1971, replacing Lakis Petropoulos. The Greeks lost 2–0 to England at the Karaiskakis Stadium on 1 December, Geoff Hurst and Martin Chivers the scorers, to ensure English qualification to Euro 1972. He left his post in February 1973 after two defeats to Spain meant Greece failed to qualify for the 1974 FIFA World Cup.

=== AEK Athens ===
Immediately after he departed from Greece on 22 February, Bingham took charge at AEK Athens, who were then looking for a replacement of Branko Stanković. He stayed at the club for three months before he left due to the bad results that kept the club out of the spots that led to next season's European competitions.

=== Everton ===
Bingham returned to English football when he took over as manager at Everton in May 1973, replacing Harry Catterick. Signing players such as Martin Dobson and Bob Latchford, he led the "Toffees" to seventh in the First Division in 1973–74, two points off a place in the UEFA Cup. Everton seemed likely to win the title again in 1974–75 but only won once in the last five games to finish a disappointing fourth, three points behind champions Derby County. In 1975–76, Everton finished eleventh, as a period of decline set in at Goodison Park. A run of eight league games without a win resulted in Bingham being sacked in January 1977; the club went on to finish 1976–77 in ninth place under Gordon Lee's stewardship, and also finish as runners-up in the League Cup final and FA Cup semi-finalists.

=== PAOK & Mansfield ===
Bingham returned to Greece in April 1977, taking charge at PAOK at Branko Stanković's expense. He lasted just six months in the job, however, before being replaced by Lakis Petropoulos, who led the club to a second-place finish in Alpha Ethniki in 1977–78. He then took charge at Mansfield Town in February 1978, replacing Peter Morris. He could not prevent the "Stags" from suffering relegation from the Second Division at the end of 1977–78. The 1978–79 season would be his last as a club manager, and he led Mansfield to 18th in the Third Division before he left Field Mill in the summer.

=== Northern Ireland (second spell) ===
Bingham was appointed manager of Northern Ireland for a second time in March 1980, and it would be in this second spell that his managerial career would be best remembered. He led the nation to victory in the British Home Championship in 1980, only the nation's second outright victory in 96 years, as they beat both Scotland and Wales, whilst holding England to a draw. However, they only managed a point in 1982. He led Northern Ireland to the 1982 FIFA World Cup, after qualifying, along with Scotland, with unlikely victories over Sweden, Portugal, and Israel. In the tournament itself, despite a limited squad with only a few genuine world-class players at his disposal (goalkeeper Pat Jennings, captain Martin O'Neill, and 17-year-old Norman Whiteside), Bingham's team stunned the host nation, Spain with a 1–0 victory at the Mestalla Stadium. Their draws with Honduras and Yugoslavia meant they shocked the world by finishing top of their group with only two goals from Gerry Armstrong. They exited in the second round with a 2–2 draw with Austria and a 4–1 defeat to France.

He led Northern Ireland to third in the British Home Championship in 1983, before they won the last ever edition of the tournament in 1984 with a 2–0 win over the Scots. However, Northern Ireland failed in qualifying for UEFA Euro 1984, despite winning their group games 1–0 over West Germany both at Belfast and at the Volksparkstadion. They were ten minutes away from qualification when, in the final group game, Germany's Gerd Strack hit a winner past Albania to claim the only qualification spot in the group for the Germans; they finished ahead of Northern Ireland on goal difference.

Bingham proved that 1982 was no fluke after he led the nation to the 1986 FIFA World Cup. They qualified, along with England, after beating Romania, Finland, and Turkey to claim second spot in their group. They faced an insurmountable challenge, however, in Brazil and Spain in group D, and exited the tournament with only a point against Algeria. He also coached Al-Nassr in the Saudi Professional League during the 1987–88 season, and led the club to their fifth King's Cup title in 1987.

The retirements of O'Neill, Jennings and Whiteside (the latter due to injury) robbed Bingham of his best players. Northern Ireland failed to reach the 1990 and 1994 finals, and he stepped down in November 1993. The final game of the 1994 World Cup qualification campaign was against Republic of Ireland, and was to be marred by sectarianism and controversy. Bingham's men set out to deny the Irish the point they needed to secure qualification ahead of Denmark, with Northern Ireland unable to qualify. Jimmy Quinn's strike was cancelled out by a late Irish equaliser. After the game there was an ugly exchange between Bingham and Ireland manager, Jack Charlton. Both 1990 and 1994 qualification groups ended with Spain and the Republic qualifying, with Northern Ireland finishing some distance short of the mark.

Bingham later served Blackpool as director of football. In May 2008 he came out of retirement to become a talent spotter in Ireland for Burnley.

== Style of play ==
Bingham played at outside-right and had excellent tactical and positional skills and good scoring ability.

== Personal and later life ==
Bingham was appointed a Member of the Order of the British Empire (MBE) for services to football in the 1981 Birthday Honours. He was married and divorced twice and had a son and daughter from his first marriage. He published his autobiography, Soccer with the Stars, in 1964; journalist Brian Glanville contributed the foreword.

He was diagnosed with dementia in 2006 and died at a care home in Southport on 9 June 2022, aged 90.

== Career statistics ==
=== Club ===
Appearances and goals by club, season and competition
Club	Season	League			FA Cup		League Cup		Total	
Club	Season	Division	Apps	Goals	Apps	Goals	Apps	Goals	Apps	Goals
Glentoran	1948–49	Irish League			—		—			
Glentoran	1949–50	Irish League			—		—			
Glentoran	1950–51	Irish League			—		—			
Glentoran	Total		60	21	0	0	0	0	60	21
Sunderland	1950–51	First Division	13	4	0	0	—		13	4
Sunderland	1951–52	First Division	36	7	2	0	—		38	7
Sunderland	1952–53	First Division	19	6	2	0	—		21	6
Sunderland	1953–54	First Division	19	3	1	0	—		20	3
Sunderland	1954–55	First Division	35	10	7	0	—		42	10
Sunderland	1955–56	First Division	27	6	6	0	—		33	6
Sunderland	1956–57	First Division	27	5	1	1	—		28	6
Sunderland	1957–58	First Division	30	4	2	1	—		32	5
Sunderland	Total		206	45	21	2	0	0	227	47
Luton Town	1958–59	First Division	36	8	9	6	—		45	14
Luton Town	1959–60	First Division	40	16	3	0	—		43	16
Luton Town	1960–61	Second Division	11	3	0	0	—		11	3
Luton Town	Total		87	27	12	6	0	0	99	33
Everton	1960–61	First Division	26	9	1	0	3	1	30	10
Everton	1961–62	First Division	37	9	3	1	0	0	40	10
Everton	1962–63	First Division	23	5	3	1	2	0	28	6
Everton	Total		86	23	7	2	5	1	98	26
Port Vale	1963–64	Third Division	35	6	2	1	1	0	38	7
Port Vale	1964–65	Third Division	5	0	0	0	0	0	5	0
Port Vale	Total		40	6	2	1	1	0	43	7
Career total			479	122	42	11	6	1	527	134

=== International ===
Appearances and goals by national team and year
National team	Year	Apps	Goals
Northern Ireland	1951	3	0
Northern Ireland	1952	4	0
Northern Ireland	1953	3	0
Northern Ireland	1954	3	1
Northern Ireland	1955	3	1
Northern Ireland	1956	3	0
Northern Ireland	1957	7	1
Northern Ireland	1958	10	0
Northern Ireland	1959	3	1
Northern Ireland	1960	4	1
Northern Ireland	1961	5	0
Northern Ireland	1962	4	2
Northern Ireland	1963	4	1
Total		56	8

Scores and results list Northern Ireland's goal tally first, score column indicates score after each Bingham goal.

List of international goals scored by Billy Bingham
No.	Date	Venue	Opponent	Score	Competition
1	3 November 1954	Glasgow, Scotland	Scotland	2–2	1954–55 British Home Championship
2	8 October 1955	Belfast, Northern Ireland	Scotland	2–1	1955–56 British Home Championship
3	16 January 1957	Lisbon, Portugal	Portugal	1–1	1958 FIFA World Cup qualification
4	5 October 1957	Belfast, Northern Ireland	Scotland	1–1	1957–58 British Home Championship
5	15 October 1958	Madrid, Spain	Spain	2–6	Friendly
6	18 November 1959	London, England	England	1–2	1959–60 British Home Championship
7	6 April 1960	Wrexham, Wales	Wales	2–3	1959–60 British Home Championship
8	7 November 1962	Glasgow, Scotland	Scotland	1–1	1962–63 British Home Championship
9	28 November 1962	Belfast, Northern Ireland	Poland	2–0	UEFA Euro 1964 qualifying
10	12 October 1963	Belfast, Northern Ireland	Scotland	2–1	1963–64 British Home Championship

=== Managerial ===
Managerial record by team and tenure
Team	From	To	Record				
Team	From	To	P	W	D	L	Win %
Southport	1 June 1965	14 February 1968	134	58	32	44	43.3
Northern Ireland	1 February 1967	4 August 1971	20	8	3	9	40.0
Plymouth Argyle	14 February 1968	1 March 1970	104	35	29	40	33.7
Linfield	1 August 1970	28 May 1971	56	40	7	9	71.4
Greece	10 September 1971	22 February 1973	12	2	3	7	16.7
AEK Athens	23 February 1973	28 May 1973	15	5	3	7	33.3
Everton	28 May 1973	8 January 1977	171	63	55	53	36.8
Mansfield Town	23 February 1978	9 July 1979	71	21	24	26	29.6
Al-Nassr	23 February 1987	9 July 1988	25	15	7	3	60.0
Northern Ireland	12 March 1980	17 November 1993	98	32	31	35	32.7
Total			705	278	194	233	39.4

== Honours ==
=== As player ===
Luton Town

- FA Cup runner-up: 1958–59

Everton

- Football League First Division: 1962–63

=== As manager ===
Southport

- Football League Fourth Division second-place promotion: 1966–67

Linfield

- Irish League: 1970–71
- Ulster Cup: 1971
- Gold Cup: 1971
- Blaxnit Cup: 1971

Northern Ireland

- British Home Championship: 1980, 1984

Al-Nassr

- King's Cup: 1987
