= 1975–76 Everton F.C. season =

English football club season

Everton
1975–76 season
- Manager: Billy Bingham
- Ground: Goodison Park
- First Division: 11th
- FA Cup: Third Round
- League Cup: Fourth Round
- UEFA Cup: First Round
- Top goalscorer: League: Bob Latchford (12); All: Bob Latchford (13)
Home colours	Away colours

During the 1975–76 English football season, Everton F.C. competed in the Football League First Division. They finished 11th in the table with 42 points.

== Final League Table ==
Pos	Team	Pld	W	D	L	GF	GA	GAv	Pts
9	Tottenham Hotspur	42	14	15	13	63	63	1.000	43
10	Norwich City	42	16	10	16	58	58	1.000	42
11	Everton	42	15	12	15	60	66	0.909	42
12	Stoke City	42	15	11	16	48	50	0.960	41
13	Middlesbrough	42	15	10	17	46	45	1.022	40

Source: World Football
Rules for classification: 1) Points; 2) Goal average; 3) Goals scored

== Results ==
Win	Draw	Loss

=== Football League First Division ===
Date	Opponent	Venue	Result	Scorers	Attendance
16 August 1975	Coventry City	H	1–4	Kenyon	33,200
19 August 1975	Burnley	A	1–1	Smallman	23,041
23 August 1975	Birmingham City	A	1–0	Smallman	26,794
26 August 1975	Sheffield United	H	3–0	Smallman pen., Lyons, Latchford	25,848
30 August 1975	Derby County	H	2–0	Lyons, Latchford	32,483
6 September 1975	Norwich City	A	2–4	Latchford, Pearson	20,407
13 September 1975	Newcastle United	H	3–0	Latchford, Lyons, Clements	28,938
20 September 1975	Arsenal	A	2–2	G. Jones, Buckley	24,864
27 September 1975	Liverpool	H	0–0		55,570
4 October 1975	West Ham United	A	1–0	G. Jones	31,005
11 October 1975	Queen's Park Rangers	A	0–5		23,855
18 October 1975	Aston Villa	H	2–1	G. Jones (2, 1 pen.)	30,376
25 October 1975	Wolverhampton Wanderers	A	2–1	Dobson, G. Jones	20,063
1 November 1975	Leicester City	H	1–1	Smallman pen.	24,930
8 November 1975	Stoke City	A	2–3	Telfer, Pearson	24,657
15 November 1975	Manchester City	H	1–1	Telfer	32,077
22 November 1975	Aston Villa	A	1–3	Telfer	33,949
29 November 1975	Leeds United	A	2–5	Clements pen., Latchford	30,879
6 December 1975	Ipswich Town	A	3–3	Dobson (2), Latchford	24,601
10 December 1975	Tottenham Hotspur	A	2–2	Telfer, Latchford	18,638
13 December 1975	Birmingham City	H	5–2	Latchford, G. Jones, Dobson, Hamilton, Telfer	20,188
19 December 1975	Coventry City	A	2–1	G. Jones pen., Latchford	14,394
23 December 1975	Manchester United	H	1–1	Latchford	41,732
27 December 1975	Middlesbrough	A	1–1	Latchford	30,000
10 January 1976	Newcastle United	A	0–5		32,076
17 January 1976	Norwich City	H	1–1	Dobson	23,164
31 January 1976	Burnley	A	2–3	Hamilton (2)	21,389
7 February 1976	Sheffield United	A	0–0		20,113
21 February 1976	Manchester City	A	0–3		33,148
24 February 1976	Tottenham Hotspur	H	1–0	Lyons	18,126
28 February 1976	Wolverhampton Wanderers	H	3–0	Telfer (2), Hamilton	21,827
6 March 1976	Leicester City	A	0–1		18,490
13 March 1976	Queen's Park Rangers	H	0–2		25,186
20 March 1976	Leeds United	H	1–3	Lyons	28,566
27 March 1976	Ipswich Town	A	0–1		22,368
3 April 1976	Liverpool	A	0–1		54,632
7 April 1976	Stoke City	H	2–1	Hamilton, Bernard pen.	16,794
10 April 1976	Arsenal	H	0–0		20,774
17 April 1976	Manchester United	A	1–2	Telfer	61,879
19 April 1976	Middlesbrough	H	3–1	Pearson, Latchford, Connolly	18,204
21 April 1976	Derby County	A	3–1	King (2), Pearson	22,488
24 April 1976	West Ham United	H	2–0	Bernard pen., Pearson	26,101

=== FA Cup ===
Round	Date	Opponent	Venue	Result	Scorers	Attendance
3	3 January 1976	Derby County	A	1–2	G. Jones	31,647

=== League Cup ===
Round	Date	Opponent	Venue	Result	Scorers	Attendance
2	9 September 1975	Arsenal	H	2–2	Lyons, Smallman	17,174
2:R	23 September 1975	Arsenal	A	1–0	Kenyon	21,813
3	8 October 1975	Carlisle United	H	2–0	Dobson, Latchford	20,010
4	11 November 1975	Notts County	H	2–2	Irving, G. Jones	19,169
4:R	25 November 1975	Notts County	A	0–2		23,323

=== UEFA Cup ===
Round	Date	Opponent	Venue	Result	Scorers	Attendance
1:1	17 September 1975	(Italy) AC Milan	H	0–0		31,917
1:2	1 October 1975	(Italy) AC Milan	A	0–1		66,000
