= 1963 FA Charity Shield =

- Event: FA Charity Shield
Everton	Manchester United
4	0
- Date: 17 August 1963
- Venue: Goodison Park, Liverpool
- Attendance: 54,844

The 1963 FA Charity Shield was the 41st FA Charity Shield, an annual football match held between the winners of the previous season's Football League and FA Cup competitions. The match was contested by Everton who had won the 1962–63 Football League, and Manchester United, who had won the 1962–63 FA Cup, at Goodison Park, Liverpool, on 17 August 1963. Everton won the match 4–0, with goals from Jimmy Gabriel, Dennis Stevens, Derek Temple and a penalty from Roy Vernon.

== Match details ==
17 August 1963

Everton	4–0	Manchester United
Gabriel; Stevens; Vernon; Temple

Goodison Park, Liverpool
Attendance: 54,844

Everton	Manchester United

1	(England) Gordon West
2	(Scotland) Alex Parker
3	(Republic of Ireland) Mick Meagan
4	(Scotland) Jimmy Gabriel
5	(England) Brian Labone
6	(England) Tony Kay
7	(Scotland) Alex Scott
8	(England) Dennis Stevens
9	(Scotland) Alex Young
10	(Wales) Roy Vernon (c)
11	(England) Derek Temple
Manager:
(England) Harry Catterick

GK	1	(England) David Gaskell
RB	2	(Republic of Ireland) Tony Dunne
LB	3	(Republic of Ireland) Noel Cantwell (c)
RH	4	(Scotland) Paddy Crerand
CH	5	(England) Bill Foulkes
LH	6	(England) Maurice Setters
OR	7	(Republic of Ireland) Johnny Giles
IR	8	(England) Albert Quixall
CF	9	(Scotland) David Herd
IL	10	(Scotland) Denis Law
OL	11	(England) Bobby Charlton
Manager:
(Scotland) Matt Busby

== See also ==
- 1962–63 Football League
- 1962–63 FA Cup
