= Operation Care =

Police investigation in Merseyside, England

Operation Care was the name given to a police investigation concerning widespread allegations of historical child sexual abuse in children's homes in the Merseyside district of England.

The investigation carried on, despite claims that police used 'trawling' methods to dig up evidence. Trawling was stopped following the Home Affairs Select Committee findings. Trawling continued under the title of 'dip-sampling'. As a result a number of people were convicted as a result of the investigations, and some convictions stand. Survivors who gave evidence have been accused of being motivated by possible compensation.

In his 2011 autobiography No Smoke, No Fire, footballer and manager Dave Jones details the terrible suffering caused to innocent ex-care workers due to false accusations made as a result of the methods used by the investigators.
