= 1961–62 Everton F.C. season =

English football club season

Everton
1961–62 season
- Manager: Harry Catterick
- Ground: Goodison Park
- First Division: 4th
- FA Cup: Fifth Round
- Top goalscorer: League: Roy Vernon (26); All: Roy Vernon (28)

During the 1961–62 English football season, Everton F.C. competed in the Football League First Division.

== Final league table ==
Pos	Team	Pld	W	D	L	GF	GA	GAv	Pts	Qualification or relegation
2	Burnley	42	21	11	10	101	67	1.507	53	
3	Tottenham Hotspur	42	21	10	11	88	69	1.275	52	Qualification for the European Cup Winners' Cup first round
4	Everton	42	20	11	11	88	54	1.630	51	Qualification for the Inter-Cities Fairs Cup first round
5	Sheffield United	42	19	9	14	61	69	0.884	47	
6	Sheffield Wednesday	42	20	6	16	72	58	1.241	46	

Source: World Football
Rules for classification: 1) Points; 2) Goal average; 3) Goals scored

== Results ==
Win	Draw	Loss

=== Football League First Division ===
Date	Opponent	Venue	Result	Attendance	Scorers
19 August 1961	Aston Villa	H	2–0		
23 August 1961	West Bromwich Albion	A	0–2		
26 August 1961	Fulham	A	1–2		
30 August 1961	West Bromwich Albion	H	3–1		
2 September 1961	Sheffield Wednesday	H	0–4		
6 September 1961	Manchester City	H	0–2		
9 September 1961	Leicester City	A	0–2		
16 September 1961	Ipswich Town	H	5–2		
20 September 1961	Manchester City	A	3–1		
23 September 1961	Burnley	A	1–2		
30 September 1961	Arsenal	H	4–1		
7 October 1961	Nottingham Forest	H	6–0		
14 October 1961	Wolverhampton Wanderers	A	3–0		
21 October 1961	Sheffield United	H	1–0		
28 October 1961	Chelsea	A	1–1		
4 November 1961	Tottenham Hotspur	H	3–0		
11 November 1961	Blackpool	A	1–1		
18 November 1961	Blackburn Rovers	H	1–0		
25 November 1961	West Ham United	A	1–3		
2 December 1961	Manchester United	H	5–1		
9 December 1961	Cardiff City	A	0–0		
16 December 1961	Aston Villa	A	1–1		
23 December 1961	Fulham	H	3–0		
26 December 1961	Bolton Wanderers	H	1–0		
13 January 1962	Sheffield Wednesday	A	1–3		
20 January 1962	Leicester City	H	3–2		
3 February 1962	Ipswich Town	A	2–4		
10 February 1962	Burnley	H	2–2		
24 February 1962	Nottingham Forest	A	1–2		
3 March 1962	Wolverhampton Wanderers	H	4–0		
14 March 1962	Sheffield United	A	1–1		
17 March 1962	Chelsea	H	4–0		
24 March 1962	Tottenham Hotspur	A	1–3		
30 March 1962	Blackpool	H	2–2		
4 April 1962	Bolton Wanderers	A	1–1		
7 April 1962	Blackburn Rovers	A	1–1		
14 April 1962	West Ham United	H	3–0		
20 April 1962	Birmingham City	H	4–1		
21 April 1962	Manchester United	A	1–1		
24 April 1962	Birmingham City	A	0–0		
28 April 1962	Cardiff City	H	8–3		
1 May 1963	Arsenal	A	3–2		

=== FA Cup ===
Round	Date	Opponent	Venue	Result	Attendance	Goalscorers
3	6 January 1962	King's Lynn	H	4–0		
4	27 January 1962	Manchester City	H	2–0		
5	17 February 1962	Burnley	A	1–3		
