= Sandy Brown (footballer, born 1939) =

Scottish footballer

Personal information
- Full name: Alexander Dewar Brown
- Date of birth: 24 March 1939
- Place of birth: Grangemouth, Scotland
- Date of death: 8 April 2014 (aged 75)
- Place of death: Blackpool, England
- Position: Left-back

Youth career
- 1956-1957: Broxburn Athletic

Senior career*
Years	Team	Apps	(Gls)
1957–1963	Partick Thistle	127	(8)
1963–1971	Everton	209	(9)
1971–1972	Shrewsbury	21	(0)
1972–1973	Southport	19	(0)
1973–1974	Fleetwood F.C.	54	(1)
Total		430	(18)

International career
1963	Scottish League XI	1	(0)
- * Club domestic league appearances and goals

Alexander Dewar Brown (24 March 1939 – 8 April 2014) was a Scottish footballer, best known as an Everton player where he played from 1963 until 1971.

== Career ==
The Scottish utility man was signed from Partick Thistle for £38,000 in September 1963. Brown had represented the Scottish League earlier that month. The athletic hard man played in several positions. Harry Catterick saw his ability to read the game and played him in front of the back four when it was needed. Against West Ham he was deployed to intercept through balls toward Hurst and Peters.

He was most effective as an overlapping full-back but also played as an emergency attacker and scored against Real Zaragoza in a European game during the 1966–67 season. In fact he played in every position during his Everton career, including goalkeeper. This came after Gordon West was sent off in a game against Newcastle United. He played four games on Everton's way to the 1966 FA Cup Final but didn't play at Wembley and missed out on a winner's medal. He did achieve silverware though, picking up a League Champions medal for the 1969-70 season with Everton.

Arguably his most memorable moment was an own goal scored during the Merseyside Derby in that championship-winning season. Many pundits including Saint and Greavsie celebrated the goal in later years, with Danny Baker referring to it is "the own goal by which all other own goals are surely measured" in his video 'Own Goals and Gaffs'. In total he played 251 games in all competitions for Everton, scoring 11 goals.

After leaving Everton in May 71 he made a further 21 appearances for Shrewsbury. He moved again the next season to Southport and played 19 games during the 1972-73 season. He then moved to Northern Premier League Fleetwood for the 1973-74 season, playing a further 54 games. After he retired from playing football, Brown worked in a biscuit factory. He died in April 2014 following long illness.

== Career statistics ==
Club	Season	League			FA Cup		League Cup		Europe		Other		Total	
Club	Season	Division	Apps	Goals	Apps	Goals	Apps	Goals	Apps	Goals	Apps	Goals	Apps	Goals
Partick Thistle	1957–58	First Division	7	1	0	0	0	0	0	0	4	0	11	1
Partick Thistle	1958–59	First Division	2	0	0	0	0	0	0	0	2	0	4	0
Partick Thistle	1959–60	First Division	15	0	3	0	0	0	0	0	4	0	22	0
Partick Thistle	1960–61	First Division	34	0	2	0	1	0	0	0	3	0	43	0
Partick Thistle	1961–62	First Division	34	0	3	0	8	0	0	0	1	0	43	0
Partick Thistle	1962–63	First Division	34	7	6	2	8	1	0	0	1	0	49	10
Partick Thistle	1963–64	First Division	1	0	0	0	5	2	0	0	0	0	6	2
Partick Thistle	Total		127	8	14	2	22	3	0	0	15	0	175	13
Everton	1963–64	First Division	30	0	5	0	0	0	0	0	0	0	35	0
Everton	1964–65	First Division	28	5	1	0	0	0	4	0	0	0	33	5
Everton	1965–66	First Division	16	0	4	0	0	0	1	0	0	0	21	0
Everton	1966–67	First Division	20	1	4	0	0	0	1	0	0	0	25	2
Everton	1967–68	First Division	25	1	2	0	2	1	0	0	0	0	29	2
Everton	1968–69	First Division	40	1	5	0	4	0	0	0	0	0	49	1
Everton	1969–70	First Division	36	0	1	0	4	0	0	0	0	0	41	0
Everton	1970–71	First Division	14	1	2	0	0	0	2	0	0	0	18	1
Everton	Total		209	9	24	0	10	1	8	1	0	0	251	11
Shrewsbury Town	1971–72	Third Division	21	0	3	0	1	0	0	0	0	0	25	0
Southport	1972–73	Fourth Division	19	0	0	0	2	0	0	0	0	0	21	0
Career total			376	17	41	2	35	4	8	1	15	0	448	26
