= 1926–27 British Home Championship =

Tournament details
- Host country: England, Ireland, Scotland and Wales
- Dates: 20 October 1926 – 9 April 1927
- Teams: 4

Final positions
- Champions: England; Scotland (shared)

Tournament statistics
- Matches played: 6
- Goals scored: 24 (4 per match)
- Top scorer: (England) Dixie Dean (4 goals)

The 1926–27 British Home Championship was a football tournament played between the British Home Nations during the 1926–27 season. It was shared by England and Scotland after a series of high scoring draws in the opening matches left England, Wales and Ireland well behind with Scotland ahead, only for England to defeat Scotland in the deciding game with a late winning goal by Dixie Dean – the first time the Scots had lost since 1924, and their first loss at home since 1906.

== Table ==
Team	Pld	W	D	L	GF	GA	GD	Pts
Scotland (C)	3	2	0	1	6	2	+4	4
England (C)	3	1	2	0	8	7	+1	4
Ireland	3	0	2	1	5	7	−2	2
Wales	3	0	2	1	5	8	−3	2

Rules for classification: 1) points. The points system worked as follows: 2 points for a win and 1 point for a draw.
(C) Co-champions

== Results ==
20 October 1926

England	3–3	Ireland
Brown; Spence; Bullock		Gillespie; Irvine; Davey

Anfield, Liverpool

30 October 1926

Scotland	3–0	Wales
Gallacher 20'; Jackson 35', 73'	Scottish FA

Ibrox Park, Glasgow
Attendance: 40,500
Referee: John G. Forshaw (England)

12 February 1927

Wales	3–3	England
L. Davies; Lewis		Dean; Walker

Racecourse Ground, Wrexham

21 February 1927

Ireland	0–2	Scotland
		Morton 45', 89'

Windsor Park, Belfast
Attendance: 40,000
Referee: George Noel Watson (England)

2 April 1927

Scotland	1–2	England
Morton 48'	Scottish FA	Dean 65', 88'

Hampden Park, Glasgow
Attendance: 111,214
Referee: Arthur Ward (England)

9 April 1927

Wales	2–2	Ireland
Williams		Johnson

Ninian Park, Cardiff
