= 1970–71 Irish League =

Irish League
- Season: 1970–71
- Champions: Linfield; 29th Irish title
- Matches played: 132
- Goals scored: 447 (3.39 per match)
- Top goalscorer: Bryan Hamilton (18 goals)

Location of teams in the Irish League from 1949–1972
Location of Belfast-based teams in the Irish League from 1949–1971

The 1970–71 Irish League was the 70th edition of the Irish League, the highest level of league competition in Northern Irish football. The league consisted of 12 teams, and Linfield won the championship.

== League standings ==
| Pos | Team | Pld | W | D | L | GF | GA | GR | Pts | Qualification |
|---|---|---|---|---|---|---|---|---|---|---|
| 1 | Linfield (C) | 22 | 18 | 2 | 2 | 58 | 16 | 3.625 | 38 | Qualification for the European Cup first round |
| 2 | Glentoran | 22 | 16 | 3 | 3 | 52 | 17 | 3.059 | 35 | Qualification for the UEFA Cup first round |
| 3 | Distillery | 22 | 13 | 4 | 5 | 51 | 29 | 1.759 | 30 | Qualification for the European Cup Winners' Cup first round |
| 4 | Coleraine | 22 | 12 | 2 | 8 | 43 | 32 | 1.344 | 26 | Participated in the Inter-Cities Fairs Cup |
| 5 | Ballymena United | 22 | 8 | 7 | 7 | 34 | 28 | 1.214 | 23 | |
| 6 | Ards | 22 | 8 | 5 | 9 | 30 | 37 | 0.811 | 21 | |
| 7 | Crusaders | 22 | 7 | 6 | 9 | 24 | 45 | 0.533 | 20 | |
| 8 | Bangor | 22 | 7 | 5 | 10 | 21 | 34 | 0.618 | 19 | |
| 9 | Derry City | 22 | 7 | 5 | 10 | 45 | 46 | 0.978 | 19 | |
| 10 | Glenavon | 22 | 5 | 3 | 14 | 39 | 55 | 0.709 | 13 | |
| 11 | Cliftonville | 22 | 3 | 6 | 13 | 26 | 53 | 0.491 | 12 | |
| 12 | Portadown | 22 | 2 | 4 | 16 | 24 | 55 | 0.436 | 8 | |

Source: rsssf.com
(C) Champions

== Results ==
| Home \ Away | ARD | BAN | BLM | CLI | COL | CRU | DIS | DER | GLV | GLT | LIN | POR |
|---|---|---|---|---|---|---|---|---|---|---|---|---|
| Ards | | 1–2 | 0–1 | 2–0 | 0–2 | 1–1 | 1–4 | 3–2 | 4–2 | 2–2 | 2–1 | 3–2 |
| Bangor | 0–0 | | 1–1 | 1–0 | 2–1 | 0–3 | 3–3 | 2–1 | 3–6 | 0–3 | 0–1 | 2–0 |
| Ballymena United | 0–1 | 4–0 | | 2–1 | 1–2 | 1–1 | 2–2 | 3–1 | 4–2 | 0–2 | 1–2 | 1–1 |
| Cliftonville | 3–3 | 1–3 | 2–2 | | 0–0 | 0–2 | 1–4 | 1–1 | 3–1 | 1–5 | 3–1 | 4–2 |
| Coleraine | 2–1 | 2–0 | 0–2 | 3–1 | | 6–0 | 1–0 | 4–2 | 4–2 | 3–1 | 1–3 | 3–2 |
| Crusaders | 0–0 | 0–0 | 1–0 | 4–1 | 2–1 | | 0–4 | 1–0 | 3–4 | 0–4 | 0–4 | 3–1 |
| Distillery | 2–1 | 0–0 | 1–1 | 3–0 | 2–0 | 3–0 | | 2–1 | 3–0 | 1–2 | 2–5 | 6–3 |
| Derry City | 3–1 | 1–0 | 2–2 | 5–2 | 4–2 | 4–0 | 1–3 | | 3–3 | 0–3 | 3–3 | 4–1 |
| Glenavon | 1–3 | 3–0 | 2–1 | 1–1 | 4–2 | 2–2 | 0–1 | 3–4 | | 1–2 | 0–2 | 1–3 |
| Glentoran | 4–0 | 1–0 | 0–2 | 5–0 | 1–1 | 1–0 | 4–1 | 2–0 | 4–1 | | 0–3 | 3–0 |
| Linfield | 3–0 | 1–0 | 3–0 | 2–0 | 2–1 | 7–0 | 2–0 | 3–1 | 2–0 | 1–1 | | 5–0 |
| Portadown | 0–1 | 1–2 | 1–3 | 1–1 | 0–2 | 1–1 | 1–4 | 2–2 | 1–0 | 0–2 | 1–2 | |

Source: Irish League Archive
Legend: Blue = home team win; Yellow = draw; Red = away team win.
