= Alex Young (footballer, born 1937) =

Scottish footballer (1937–2017)

Personal information
- Full name: Alexander Young
- Date of birth: 3 February 1937
- Place of birth: Loanhead, Scotland
- Date of death: 27 February 2017 (aged 80)
- Place of death: Edinburgh, Scotland
- Position: Forward

Senior career*
Years	Team	Apps	(Gls)
- Newtongrange Star
1955–1960	Heart of Midlothian	155	(71)
1960–1968	Everton	228	(77)
1968	Glentoran	6	(1)
1968–1969	Stockport County	23	(5)
Total		412	(154)

International career
1956–1959	Scotland U23	6	(3)
1958	SFL trial v SFA	1	(1)
1958–1960	Scottish League	2	(2)
1960	SFA trial v SFL	1	(0)
1960–1966	Scotland	8	(5)

Managerial career
- 1968: Glentoran
- * Club domestic league appearances and goals

Alexander Young (3 February 1937 – 27 February 2017) was a Scottish international footballer. He played as a creative forward for Heart of Midlothian and Everton. He won league championship and cup titles with both clubs where he was also a regular goal scorer. Young later played for Glentoran and Stockport County. Internationally he played for the Scottish League and the Scotland national football team. In football folklore he has become known as 'The Golden Vision'.

== Early years ==
Young was born in Loanhead, Midlothian. He described himself as shy from an understandably over-watchful mother having to cope with the death of a son five years older than Alex being fatally hit by a car. Young later said that as a youngster he grew up supporting the same team as his father, Motherwell. Young first played for Newtongrange Star in Midlothian, while he also worked as a colliery apprentice.

== Playing career ==
=== Heart of Midlothian ===
He joined Tommy Walker's Hearts in 1955 making his debut aged 18. This particular Hearts side had won their breakthrough tournament the year before winning the 1954 Scottish League Cup Final. With Young they next won the 1956 Scottish Cup Final. With Hearts' 'Terrible Trio' forward line of Jimmy Wardhaugh, Willie Bauld and Alfie Conn, Sr at their peak, Young played at right wing.

Hearts led the Scottish League for most of the 1956–57 season. The title hinged on Rangers visit to Tynecastle on 13 April. A capacity crowd watched a tense game in which Rangers keeper, George Niven, was man of the match. Hearts could not beat him and the only goal came from Simpson of Rangers who scored on the break in 35 minutes. Rangers had games in hand which they won to overtake Hearts and lift the trophy.

Young helped Hearts win the Scottish league championship in 1957–58, as part of a new Hearts goal scoring trinity with Wardhaugh and Jimmy Murray. In a crucial October visit to Ibrox, Young scored to transform a 2–0 deficit into a 3–2 win. On 12 April 1958 Hearts won 3–2 at St Mirren to clinch the title with Young scoring the winner. Wardhaugh was the League's top marksman with 28 strikes. This was one ahead of Jimmy Murray's 27 and four more than Young's 24. Hearts won that League title in 1957–58 with record-breaking points, goals scored and goal difference. Their record from 34 league games of 62 points out of a maximum possible 68 was 13 more than their nearest rival. They scored 132 goals (still the Scottish top tier record) with only 29 against for a record net difference of +103.

Young missed out on Hearts' October 1958 Scottish League Cup Final win. They led the league championship in December but with injuries taking their toll they lost 6–0 in a visit to Ibrox Park. This began a poor run of only two wins from the next seven games. Dave Mackay was sold in March to Tottenham Hotspur, but Hearts fought back into contention when they won 2–0 against Rangers in April. Rangers went into the last day of the season two points clear and needing a point to clinch the title. Rangers lost 2–1 at home to Aberdeen, giving Hearts a chance to win the title, but they also lost 2–1.

In 1959/60 he scored 23 goals as Hearts won the league title again. In the New Year derby away to Hibs, Young's hat-trick inspired a 5–1 win. He played that season alongside his boyhood hero, Gordon Smith, who had joined Hearts that season. They also won the 1959 Scottish League Cup Final that season. Young playing at centre forward scored the winner for a second career goal to clinch a title.

Between 1955 and 1960, Young made 194 appearances for Heart of Midlothian in all competitions, scoring 103 goals. Young was inducted to the club's hall of fame in 2007.

=== Everton ===
Young was transferred in November 1960 to Everton, along with George Thomson, for £55,000. A partnership with Roy Vernon soon developed. Young scored 22 league goals in the 42 league games and made many other goals in Everton's 1962–63 league championship winning season. His elegant touch earned him the nickname of 'The Golden Vision', a title coined by Danny Blanchflower – "...the view every Saturday that we have of a more perfect world, a world that has got a pattern and is finite. And that's Alex – the Golden Vision."

In addition to the championship, Young won an FA Cup winners medal in Everton's comeback win in the 1966 FA Cup Final. Young scored 89 goals in 275 appearances in all competitions for Everton. Young was at his prime when aged 23 – 26 when at Everton before being troubled by a knee injury. He also had career long issues with blistered feet that affected his performances.

Describing his manager at Everton Harry Catterick as “Hellish” to play for, on leaving the club Young had a gentleman’s agreement for a £1,000 settlement, however when he approached Catterick for the money the manager laughed in his face, and told him "let that be a lesson to you, son: Get everything in writing".

=== Glentoran and Stockport County ===
Young was sold to Glentoran in 1968 for £10,000, and briefly managed the club before his failing hearing forced him to step down. Young later played briefly for Stockport County for 23 games before a knee injury forced his retirement aged 31.

=== Scotland ===
His full international debut for Scotland came in April 1960, in a 1–1 draw against England attended by 129,193 fans at Hampden Park. By November that year he had six caps, playing alongside an Everton player in each of his last two caps (Jimmy Gabriel and Alex Parker). He moved to Everton before the end of the month of the latter of those two internationals.

Young played one international game in 1961, a 3–0 win against the Republic of Ireland, scoring twice. He didn't play another full international again for five years, including his championship winning season at Everton. Young was recalled to the national squad in summer 1966, after his FA Cup win. He was capped a total of eight times by Scotland, scoring five goals. He also scored 2 goals in 2 appearances for the Scottish League.

== After playing ==
After football Young ran his family's business wholesaling soft furnishings in Edinburgh before retiring. His son, Jason, became a professional footballer in the 1990s but could not match his famous father's prowess, and spent his career mostly in the Scottish lower divisions. Young was included in the Football League's "100 Legends of the 20th Century" in 1999, and in August 2001 Everton gave him a testimonial at Goodison Park, which over 20,000 fans attended. He was also named as a member of Gwladys Street's Hall of Fame.

== Personal life ==
Young married Nancy in 1957, and had three children: Jane, Alex Jnr and Jason. Young died at the age of 80 on 27 February 2017 after a short illness. He was survived by wife Nancy who died on 28 October 2023, and their three children.

== In popular culture ==
Ken Loach's 1968 docu-drama, The Golden Vision, concerned a group of Everton fans and was named after Young, who also appears on-screen.

== Honours ==
Hearts

- Scottish League: 1957–58, 1959–60
- Scottish Cup: 1955–56
- Scottish League Cup: 1959–60

Everton

- Football League First Division: 1962–63
- FA Cup: 1965–66
- FA Charity Shield: 1963

Individual

Young was named as one of the Football League 100 Legends of the 20th Century in May 1999.
