= 1962–63 Football League First Division =

1962–63 season of Football League First Division

First Division
- Season: 1962–63
- Champions: Everton; 6th English title
- Relegated: Manchester City; Leyton Orient
- European Cup: Everton
- European Cup Winners' Cup: Tottenham Hotspur; Manchester United
- Inter-Cities Fairs Cup: Sheffield Wednesday; Arsenal
- Matches: 462
- Goals: 1,536 (3.32 per match)
- Top goalscorer: Jimmy Greaves (37 goals)
- Biggest home win: Wolverhampton Wanderers 8–1 Manchester City (18 August 1962); Tottenham Hotspur 9–2 Nottingham Forest (29 September 1962); Wolverhampton Wanderers 7–0 West Bromwich Albion (16 March 1963)
- Biggest away win: West Ham United 1–6 Tottenham Hotspur (25 August 1962); Manchester City 1–6 West Ham United (8 September 1962); Fulham 0–5 Wolverhampton Wanderers (8 December 1962)
- Highest scoring: Tottenham Hotspur 9–2 Nottingham Forest (29 September 1962)

Statistics of Football League First Division in the 1962-63 season.

== Overview ==
Everton won the First Division title for the sixth time in the club's history that season. They made sure of the title on May 11, after a 4–1 win over Fulham at Goodison Park. Leyton Orient were relegated on 4 May after a 3–1 defeat at Sheffield Wednesday. Manchester City joined them on the final weekend of the season, losing 6–1 at West Ham United, which saved Birmingham City, who won 3–2 at home against Leicester City.

== League standings ==
Pos	Team	Pld	W	D	L	GF	GA	GAv	Pts	Qualification or relegation
1	Everton (C)	42	25	11	6	84	42	2.000	61	Qualification for the European Cup preliminary round
2	Tottenham Hotspur	42	23	9	10	111	62	1.790	55	Qualification for the European Cup Winners' Cup second round (Note: Tottenham Hotspur qualified for the European Cup Winners' Cup second round as the 1962–63 European Cup Winners' Cup winners.)
3	Burnley	42	22	10	10	78	57	1.368	54	
4	Leicester City	42	20	12	10	79	53	1.491	52	
5	Wolverhampton Wanderers	42	20	10	12	93	65	1.431	50	
6	Sheffield Wednesday	42	19	10	13	77	63	1.222	48	Qualification for the Inter-Cities Fairs Cup first round
7	Arsenal	42	18	10	14	86	77	1.117	46	Qualification for the Inter-Cities Fairs Cup first round
8	Liverpool	42	17	10	15	71	59	1.203	44	
9	Nottingham Forest	42	17	10	15	67	69	0.971	44	
10	Sheffield United	42	16	12	14	58	60	0.967	44	
11	Blackburn Rovers	42	15	12	15	79	71	1.113	42	
12	West Ham United	42	14	12	16	73	69	1.058	40	
13	Blackpool	42	13	14	15	58	64	0.906	40	
14	West Bromwich Albion	42	16	7	19	71	79	0.899	39	
15	Aston Villa	42	15	8	19	62	68	0.912	38	
16	Fulham	42	14	10	18	50	71	0.704	38	
17	Ipswich Town	42	12	11	19	59	78	0.756	35	
18	Bolton Wanderers	42	15	5	22	55	75	0.733	35	
19	Manchester United	42	12	10	20	67	81	0.827	34	Qualification for the European Cup Winners' Cup first round (Note: Manchester United qualified for the European Cup Winners' Cup first round as the 1962–63 FA Cup winners.)
20	Birmingham City	42	10	13	19	63	90	0.700	33	
21	Manchester City (R)	42	10	11	21	58	102	0.569	31	Relegation to the Second Division
22	Leyton Orient (R)	42	6	9	27	37	81	0.457	21	Relegation to the Second Division

Source: World Football
Rules for classification: 1) Points; 2) Goal average; 3) Goals scored
(C) Champions; (R) Relegated

== Results ==
Home \ Away	ARS	AST	BIR	BLB	BLP	BOL	BUR	EVE	FUL	IPS	LEI	LEY	LIV	MCI	MUN	NOT	SHU	SHW	TOT	WBA	WHU	WOL
Arsenal		1–2	2–0	3–1	2–0	3–2	2–3	4–3	3–0	3–1	1–1	2–0	2–2	2–3	1–3	0–0	1–0	1–2	2–3	3–2	1–1	5–4
Aston Villa	3–1		4–0	0–0	1–1	5–0	2–1	0–2	1–2	4–2	3–1	1–0	2–0	3–1	1–2	0–2	1–2	0–2	2–1	2–0	3–1	0–2
Birmingham City	2–2	3–2		3–3	3–6	2–2	5–1	0–1	4–1	0–1	3–2	2–2	0–2	2–2	2–1	2–2	0–1	1–1	0–2	0–0	3–2	3–4
Blackburn Rovers	5–5	4–1	6–1		3–3	5–0	2–3	3–2	0–1	0–1	2–0	1–1	1–0	4–1	2–2	2–5	1–2	3–0	3–0	3–1	0–4	5–1
Blackpool	3–2	4–0	1–1	4–1		3–1	0–0	1–2	0–0	1–0	1–1	3–2	1–2	2–2	2–2	2–1	3–1	2–3	1–2	0–2	0–0	0–2
Bolton Wanderers	3–0	4–1	0–0	0–0	3–0		2–2	0–2	1–0	1–3	2–0	0–1	1–0	3–1	3–0	1–0	3–2	0–4	1–0	1–2	3–0	3–0
Burnley	2–1	3–1	3–1	1–0	2–0	2–1		1–3	4–0	3–1	1–1	2–0	1–3	0–0	0–1	0–0	5–1	4–0	2–1	2–1	1–1	2–0
Everton	1–1	1–1	2–2	0–0	5–0	1–0	3–1		4–1	3–1	3–2	3–0	2–2	2–1	3–1	2–0	3–0	4–1	1–0	4–2	1–1	0–0
Fulham	1–3	1–0	3–3	0–0	2–0	2–1	1–1	1–0		1–1	2–1	0–2	0–0	2–4	0–1	3–1	2–2	4–1	0–2	1–2	2–0	0–5
Ipswich Town	1–1	1–1	1–5	3–3	5–2	4–1	2–1	0–3	0–1		0–1	1–1	2–2	0–0	3–5	1–1	1–0	2–0	2–4	1–1	2–3	2–3
Leicester City	2–0	3–3	3–0	2–0	0–0	4–1	3–3	3–1	2–3	3–0		5–1	3–0	2–0	4–3	2–1	3–1	3–3	2–2	1–0	2–0	1–1
Leyton Orient	1–2	0–2	2–2	1–1	0–2	0–1	0–1	3–0	1–1	1–2	0–2		2–1	1–1	1–0	0–1	2–2	2–4	1–5	2–3	2–0	0–4
Liverpool	2–1	4–0	5–1	3–1	1–2	1–0	1–2	0–0	2–1	1–1	0–2	5–0		4–1	1–0	0–2	2–0	0–2	5–2	2–2	2–1	4–1
Manchester City	2–4	0–2	2–1	0–1	0–3	2–1	2–5	1–1	2–3	2–1	1–1	2–0	2–2		1–1	1–0	1–3	3–2	1–0	1–5	1–6	3–3
Manchester United	2–3	2–2	2–0	0–3	1–1	3–0	2–5	0–1	0–2	0–1	2–2	3–1	3–3	2–3		5–1	1–1	1–3	0–2	2–2	3–1	2–1
Nottingham Forest	3–0	3–1	0–2	2–0	2–0	1–0	2–1	3–4	3–1	2–1	0–2	1–1	3–1	1–1	3–2		2–1	0–3	1–1	2–2	3–4	2–0
Sheffield United	3–3	2–1	0–2	1–1	0–0	4–1	1–0	2–1	2–0	2–1	0–0	2–0	0–0	3–1	1–1	3–1		2–2	3–1	1–0	0–2	1–2
Sheffield Wednesday	2–3	0–0	5–0	4–0	0–0	1–1	0–1	2–2	1–0	0–3	0–3	3–1	0–2	4–1	1–0	2–2	3–1		3–1	3–1	1–3	3–1
Tottenham Hotspur	4–4	4–2	3–0	4–1	2–0	4–1	1–1	0–0	1–1	5–0	4–0	2–0	7–2	4–2	6–2	9–2	4–2	1–1		2–1	4–4	1–2
West Bromwich Albion	1–2	1–0	1–0	2–5	1–2	5–4	1–2	0–4	6–1	6–1	2–1	2–1	1–0	2–1	3–0	1–4	1–2	0–3	1–2		1–0	2–2
West Ham United	0–4	1–1	5–0	0–1	2–2	1–2	1–1	1–2	2–2	1–3	2–0	2–0	1–0	6–1	3–1	4–1	1–1	2–0	1–6	2–2		1–4
Wolverhampton Wanderers	1–0	3–1	0–2	4–2	2–0	4–0	7–2	0–2	2–1	0–0	1–3	2–1	3–2	8–1	2–3	1–1	0–0	2–2	2–2	7–0	0–0	

Updated to match(es) played on unknown. Source: Ian Laschke: Rothmans Book of Football League Records 1888–89 to 1978–79. Macdonald and Jane’s, London & Sydney, 1980.
Legend: Blue = home team win; Yellow = draw; Red = away team win.

== Top scorers ==
Rank	Player	Club	Goals
1	(England) Jimmy Greaves	Tottenham Hotspur	37
2	(England) Joe Baker	Arsenal	29
=	(England) David Layne	Sheffield Wednesday	29
4	(England) Ray Crawford	Ipswich Town	25
5	(England) Roger Hunt	Liverpool	24
=	(Wales) Roy Vernon	Everton	24
7	(Scotland) Denis Law	Manchester United	23
=	(England) Fred Pickering	Blackburn Rovers	23
=	(Scotland) Alex Harley	Manchester City	23

== Attendances ==
Everton FC drew the highest average home attendance in the league.

#	Football club	Home games	Average attendance
1	Everton FC	21	51,603
2	Tottenham Hotspur	21	47,342
3	Liverpool FC	21	42,971
4	Manchester United	21	40,329
5	Arsenal FC	21	32,288
6	Aston Villa	21	30,779
7	Wolverhampton Wanderers	21	26,817
8	Leicester City	21	25,841
9	Burnley FC	21	25,180
10	Sheffield Wednesday	21	24,790
11	Manchester City	21	24,683
12	West Ham United	21	23,621
13	Sheffield United	21	22,775
14	Birmingham City	21	22,524
15	Nottingham Forest	21	22,086
16	Fulham FC	21	21,986
17	Bolton Wanderers	21	19,406
18	Ipswich Town	21	19,044
19	Blackpool FC	21	18,536
20	West Bromwich Albion	21	18,531
21	Leyton Orient	21	16,406
22	Blackburn Rovers	21	16,001
