= Jack Bentley (footballer) =

English footballer (1942–2007)

Personal information
- Date of birth: 17 February 1942
- Place of birth: Liverpool, England
- Date of death: 26 May 2007 (aged 65)
- Position: Striker

Senior career*
Years	Team	Apps	(Gls)
1960–1961	Everton	1	(0)
1961–1962	Stockport County	49	(5)
1963-1977	Telford United	835	(431)
Total		885	(436)
- * Club domestic league appearances and goals

Jack Bentley (17 February 1942 – 26 May 2007) was an English professional footballer.

After early spells with Everton and Stockport Bentley moved to non-league side Telford United. In a 14-year stay Bentley scored 431 goals in 835 appearances.
