= Derek Temple =

English footballer

Personal information
- Full name: Derek William Temple
- Date of birth: 13 November 1938 (age 87)
- Place of birth: Liverpool, Lancashire, England
- Height: 5 ft 7 in (1.70 m)
- Position: Forward

Youth career
- Everton

Senior career*
Years	Team	Apps	(Gls)
1957–1967	Everton	234	(72)
1967–1970	Preston North End	76	(14)
1970–1971	Wigan Athletic	40	(9)
Total		350	(95)

International career
1965	England	1	(0)
- * Club domestic league appearances and goals

Derek William Temple (born 13 November 1938) is an English former footballer who played in the Football League as a forward for Everton and Preston North End in the Football League. He was capped once for England.

Temple was born in Liverpool, Lancashire, and came through Everton's junior sides to make his first-team debut at centre-forward on 30 March 1957. He moved to inside forward later that year and linked up well with Dave Hickson, but the partnership was broken up when Temple was called up for his National Service. Harry Catterick moved Temple to the left wing in 1961, and during his first season in this position he scored 10 goals in 17 games. He missed out on a league winner's medal the next season, sidelined by a cartilage operation, but recovered to play in the 1963 FA Charity Shield. Temple scored the late winner in Everton's 3–2 defeat of Sheffield Wednesday in the 1966 FA Cup Final. In his Everton career he made 272 appearances (one as substitute) scoring 82 goals (72 League, 8 FA Cup and 2 in Europe).

Temple was transferred to Preston North End for in 1967 for a £35,000 fee. He made 76 league appearances for Preston, scoring 14 goals. He joined Wigan Athletic for £4,000 in the summer of 1970. He made 40 Northern Premier League appearances for the club before deciding to retire.

Temple played once for the England team, selected by Alf Ramsey for the game on 12 May 1965 against West Germany which England won 1–0.

== Honours ==
Everton

- FA Cup: 1965–66
