= Dennis Stevens =

English footballer (1933–2012)

Personal information
- Date of birth: 30 November 1933
- Place of birth: Dudley, Worcestershire, England
- Date of death: 20 December 2012 (aged 79)
- Position: Inside forward

Youth career
- –: Bolton Wanderers

Senior career*
Years	Team	Apps	(Gls)
1953–1962	Bolton Wanderers	273	(90)
1962–1965	Everton	120	(20)
1965–1966	Oldham Athletic	33	(0)
1966–1968	Tranmere Rovers	32	(3)
Total		458	(113)
- * Club domestic league appearances and goals

Dennis Stevens (30 November 1933 – 20 December 2012) was an English footballer, born in Dudley, Worcestershire who played in the Football League for Bolton Wanderers, Everton, Oldham Athletic and Tranmere Rovers.

Stevens began his career with Bolton Wanderers and established himself in the side as a scheming inside-forward, winning the FA Cup in 1958. He joined Everton in 1962 as cover, shortly before Bobby Collins moved to Leeds United. He became a vital member of Everton's midfield, being an ever-present in the League over two seasons and winning a League Championship medal in 1963, quickly followed by winning the 1963 FA Charity Shield. After leaving Everton, he played for Oldham Athletic and Tranmere Rovers.

Stevens was the cousin of Manchester United and England player Duncan Edwards who died as a result of the Munich air disaster. They played against one another at Old Trafford on 18 January 1958, where Bolton were beaten 7–2 by United, less than three weeks before the tragedy. Stevens died on 20 December 2012 after a long illness.

== Honours ==
Bolton Wanderers

- FA Cup: 1957–58
