= 1962–63 FA Cup =

Tournament details
- Country: England; Wales

Final positions
- Champions: Manchester United (3rd title)
- Runners-up: Leicester City

Tournament statistics
- Top goal scorer(s): Denis Law; Terry Allcock (6)

The 1962–63 FA Cup was the 82nd staging of the world's oldest football cup competition, the Football Association Challenge Cup, commonly known as the FA Cup. Manchester United won the competition for only the third time, beating Leicester City 3–1 in the final at Wembley.

If scores were level after 90 minutes had been played, a replay would take place at the stadium of the second-named team later the same week. If the replayed match was drawn further replays would be held until a winner was determined. If scores were level after 90 minutes had been played in a replay, a 30-minute period of extra time would be played.

Matches were scheduled to be played at the stadium of the team named first on the date specified for each round, which was always a Saturday. Some matches, however, might be rescheduled for other days if there were clashes with games for other competitions. The Big Freeze of 1962–1963, was one of the coldest winters on record Football matches suffered because of the severe effects of the winter weather. Some cup matches were rescheduled ten or more times. Matches in the fifth and sixth rounds, scheduled for 16 February and 9 March respectively, were played on 16 and 30 March. A board known as the Pools Panel was set up to adjudicate postponed matches to provide the football pool results. From 26 December to 9 February, Leicester completed no league matches. The delays occurred before under-soil heating became widespread at major venues. When the thaw arrived, a backlog of fixtures had to be hastily determined. The Football League season was extended by four weeks from its original finishing date of 27 April. The final league fixtures took place one day before the rescheduled FA Cup final.

== Calendar ==
| Round | Date | Postponed date |
|---|---|---|
| First qualifying round | Saturday 8 September 1962 | |
| Second qualifying round | Saturday 22 September 1962 | |
| Third qualifying round | Saturday 6 October 1962 | |
| Fourth qualifying round | Saturday 20 October 1962 | |
| First round proper | Saturday 3 November 1962 | |
| Second round | Saturday 24 November 1962 | |
| Third round | Saturday 5 January 1963 | |
| Fourth round | Saturday 26 January 1963 | |
| Fifth round | Saturday 16 February 1963 | 16 March |
| Sixth round | Saturday 9 March 1963 | 30 March |
| Semi-finals | Saturday 30 March 1963 | 27 April |
| Final | Saturday 4 May 1963 | 25 May |

== Qualifying rounds ==
Most participating clubs that were not members of the Football League competed in the qualifying rounds to secure one of 30 places available in the first round.

The winners from the fourth qualifying round were Blyth Spartans, North Shields, Gateshead, South Shields, Wigan Athletic, Rhyl, Morecambe, Hereford United, Wellington Town, Hinckley Athletic, Buxton, Scarborough, Boston United, Chelmsford City, King's Lynn, Bedford Town, Cambridge United, Sittingbourne, Margate, Gravesend & Northfleet, Dartford, Wimbledon, Enfield, Wycombe Wanderers, Maidenhead United, Andover, Poole Town, Cheltenham Town, Yeovil Town and Falmouth Town.

Those appearing in the competition proper for the first time were Andover and Falmouth Town. Of the others, North Shields and Wimbledon had last featured at this stage in 1952–53, Gravesend & Northfleet in 1949–50, Poole Town in 1946–47 and Sittingbourne in 1930–31. Falmouth Town was notably the first club from Cornwall ever to qualify for the first round of the FA Cup, while Gravesend & Northfleet was embarking on an unexpected eight-round run through the tournament. They defeated Chatham Town, Sutton United, Erith & Belvedere, Lewes, Exeter City, Wycombe Wanderers and Carlisle United (at Brunton Park) before finally going out to Sunderland in a fourth-round replay at Roker Park.

== Results ==
=== First round proper ===
At this stage the 48 clubs from the Football League Third and Fourth Divisions joined the 30 non-league clubs who came through the qualifying rounds. The final two non-league sides in the main draw, Crook Town and Hounslow Town were given byes to this round as the champions and runners-up from the previous season's FA Amateur Cup. Matches were scheduled to be played on Saturday, 3 November 1962. Nine were drawn and went to replays.

| Tie no | Home team | Score | Away team | Date |
|---|---|---|---|---|
| 1 | Andover | 0–1 | Gillingham | 3 November 1962 |
| 2 | Chester | 0–2 | Tranmere Rovers | 3 November 1962 |
| 3 | Chesterfield | 4–1 | Stockport County | 3 November 1962 |
| 4 | Bristol City | 4–2 | Wellington Town | 3 November 1962 |
| 5 | Watford | 2–2 | Poole Town | 3 November 1962 |
| Replay | Poole Town | 1–2 | Watford | 6 November 1962 |
| 6 | Yeovil Town | 3–2 | Dartford | 3 November 1962 |
| 7 | Notts County | 0–3 | Peterborough United | 3 November 1962 |
| 8 | Crewe Alexandra | 1–1 | Scarborough | 3 November 1962 |
| Replay | Scarborough | 2–3 | Crewe Alexandra | 7 November 1962 |
| 9 | Lincoln City | 1–1 | Darlington | 3 November 1962 |
| Replay | Darlington | 1–2 | Lincoln City | 7 November 1962 |
| 10 | Swindon Town | 4–2 | Reading | 3 November 1962 |
| 11 | Buxton | 2–2 | Barrow | 3 November 1962 |
| Replay | Barrow | 3–1 | Buxton | 5 November 1962 |
| 12 | Queens Park Rangers | 3–2 | Newport County | 3 November 1962 |
| 13 | Barnsley | 4–0 | Rhyl | 3 November 1962 |
| 14 | Bristol Rovers | 0–2 | Port Vale | 3 November 1962 |
| 15 | Northampton Town | 1–2 | Torquay United | 3 November 1962 |
| 16 | Coventry City | 1–0 | Bournemouth & Boscombe Athletic | 3 November 1962 |
| 17 | Millwall | 3–1 | Margate | 3 November 1962 |
| 18 | Hull City | 5–4 | Crook Town | 3 November 1962 |
| 19 | Carlisle United | 2–1 | Hartlepools United | 3 November 1962 |
| 20 | Oldham Athletic | 2–5 | Bradford City | 3 November 1962 |
| 21 | Crystal Palace | 2–0 | Hereford United | 3 November 1962 |
| 22 | Wimbledon | 2–1 | Colchester United | 3 November 1962 |
| 23 | Southend United | 2–1 | Brighton & Hove Albion | 3 November 1962 |
| 24 | Blyth Spartans | 2–1 | Morecambe | 3 November 1962 |
| 25 | Bedford Town | 2–1 | Cambridge United | 3 November 1962 |
| 26 | Halifax Town | 1–0 | Bradford Park Avenue | 3 November 1962 |
| 27 | Cheltenham Town | 3–6 | Enfield | 3 November 1962 |
| 28 | Southport | 1–1 | Wrexham | 3 November 1962 |
| Replay | Wrexham | 3–2 | Southport | 7 November 1962 |
| 29 | Maidenhead United | 0–3 | Wycombe Wanderers | 3 November 1962 |
| 30 | York City | 0–0 | Rochdale | 3 November 1962 |
| Replay | Rochdale | 1–2 | York City | 6 November 1962 |
| 31 | Aldershot | 1–0 | Brentford | 3 November 1962 |
| 32 | Gateshead | 2–1 | Wigan Athletic | 3 November 1962 |
| 33 | North Shields | 2–2 | Workington | 3 November 1962 |
| Replay | Workington | 7–2 | North Shields | 8 November 1962 |
| 34 | Hounslow Town | 3–3 | Mansfield Town | 3 November 1962 |
| Replay | Mansfield Town | 9–2 | Hounslow Town | 5 November 1962 |
| 35 | Boston United | 1–2 | King's Lynn | 3 November 1962 |
| 36 | South Shields | 0–0 | Doncaster Rovers | 3 November 1962 |
| Replay | Doncaster Rovers | 2–1 | South Shields | 8 November 1962 |
| 37 | Chelmsford City | 2–6 | Shrewsbury Town | 3 November 1962 |
| 38 | Gravesend & Northfleet | 3–2 | Exeter City | 3 November 1962 |
| 39 | Hinckley Athletic | 3–0 | Sittingbourne | 3 November 1962 |
| 40 | Falmouth Town | 1–2 | Oxford United | 3 November 1962 |

=== Second round ===
The matches were scheduled for Saturday, 24 November 1962. Two matches were drawn, with replays taking place later the same week.

| Tie no | Home team | Score | Away team | Date |
|---|---|---|---|---|
| 1 | Bristol City | 2–1 | Wimbledon | 24 November 1962 |
| 2 | Yeovil Town | 0–2 | Swindon Town | 24 November 1962 |
| 3 | Gillingham | 3–0 | Bedford Town | 24 November 1962 |
| 4 | Lincoln City | 1–0 | Halifax Town | 24 November 1962 |
| 5 | Shrewsbury Town | 2–1 | Torquay United | 24 November 1962 |
| 6 | Doncaster Rovers | 1–4 | Tranmere Rovers | 24 November 1962 |
| 7 | Wrexham | 5–2 | Barrow | 24 November 1962 |
| 8 | Queens Park Rangers | 7–2 | Hinckley Athletic | 24 November 1962 |
| 9 | Barnsley | 2–1 | Chesterfield | 24 November 1962 |
| 10 | King's Lynn | 1–2 | Oxford United | 24 November 1962 |
| 11 | Bradford City | 3–2 | Gateshead | 24 November 1962 |
| 12 | Millwall | 0–0 | Coventry City | 24 November 1962 |
| Replay | Coventry City | 2–1 | Millwall | 27 November 1962 |
| 13 | Hull City | 2–0 | Workington | 24 November 1962 |
| 14 | Crystal Palace | 2–2 | Mansfield Town | 24 November 1962 |
| Replay | Mansfield Town | 7–2 | Crystal Palace | 26 November 1962 |
| 15 | Southend United | 0–2 | Watford | 24 November 1962 |
| 16 | Blyth Spartans | 0–2 | Carlisle United | 24 November 1962 |
| 17 | Port Vale | 2–0 | Aldershot | 24 November 1962 |
| 18 | York City | 2–1 | Crewe Alexandra | 24 November 1962 |
| 19 | Peterborough United | 1–0 | Enfield | 24 November 1962 |
| 20 | Gravesend & Northfleet | 3–1 | Wycombe Wanderers | 24 November 1962 |

=== Third round ===
The 44 First and Second Division clubs entered the competition at this stage. The matches were scheduled for Saturday, 5 January 1963, but due to the Big Freeze of 1963, only three games were completed at this date. The bulk of matches were not completed until February and March, with the final non-replay tie being played on 7 March. There were nine replays in total, of which the earliest possible playing date was 30 January, and the latest the 11 March.

| Tie no | Home team | Score | Away team | Date |
|---|---|---|---|---|
| 1 | Bristol City | 1–1 | Aston Villa | 16 January 1963 |
| Replay | Aston Villa | 3–2 | Bristol City | 7 March 1963 |
| 2 | Preston North End | 1–4 | Sunderland | 5 January 1963 |
| 3 | Southampton | 5–0 | York City | 13 February 1963 |
| 4 | Watford | 2–0 | Rotherham United | 20 February 1963 |
| 5 | Walsall | 0–1 | Manchester City | 6 March 1963 |
| 6 | Gillingham | 2–4 | Port Vale | 27 February 1963 |
| 7 | Nottingham Forest | 4–3 | Wolverhampton Wanderers | 29 January 1963 |
| 8 | Blackburn Rovers | 1–1 | Middlesbrough | 5 March 1963 |
| Replay | Middlesbrough | 3–1 | Blackburn Rovers | 11 March 1963 |
| 9 | Grimsby Town | 1–3 | Leicester City | 8 January 1963 |
| 10 | Derby County | 2–0 | Peterborough United | 4 February 1963 |
| 11 | Lincoln City | 1–5 | Coventry City | 6 March 1963 |
| 12 | Luton Town | 0–2 | Swindon Town | 26 January 1963 |
| 13 | Shrewsbury Town | 1–1 | Sheffield Wednesday | 21 February 1963 |
| Replay | Sheffield Wednesday | 2–1 | Shrewsbury Town | 7 March 1963 |
| 14 | Wrexham | 0–3 | Liverpool | 9 January 1963 |
| 15 | Sheffield United | 3–1 | Bolton Wanderers | 6 March 1963 |
| 16 | Tranmere Rovers | 2–2 | Chelsea | 5 January 1963 |
| Replay | Chelsea | 3–1 | Tranmere Rovers | 30 January 1963 |
| 17 | Tottenham Hotspur | 0–3 | Burnley | 16 January 1963 |
| 18 | Barnsley | 0–3 | Everton | 15 January 1963 |
| 19 | Portsmouth | 1–1 | Scunthorpe United | 26 January 1963 |
| Replay | Scunthorpe United | 1–2 | Portsmouth | 7 March 1963 |
| 20 | West Ham United | 0–0 | Fulham | 4 February 1963 |
| Replay | Fulham | 1–2 | West Ham United | 20 February 1963 |
| 21 | Manchester United | 5–0 | Huddersfield Town | 4 March 1963 |
| 22 | Norwich City | 1–1 | Blackpool | 4 March 1963 |
| Replay | Blackpool | 1–3 | Norwich City | 6 March 1963 |
| 23 | Plymouth Argyle | 1–5 | West Bromwich Albion | 5 January 1963 |
| 24 | Bradford City | 1–6 | Newcastle United | 7 March 1963 |
| 25 | Carlisle United | 0–1 | Gravesend & Northfleet | 29 January 1963 |
| 26 | Mansfield Town | 2–3 | Ipswich Town | 9 January 1963 |
| 27 | Swansea Town | 2–0 | Queens Park Rangers | 26 January 1963 |
| 28 | Charlton Athletic | 1–0 | Cardiff City | 18 February 1963 |
| 29 | Arsenal | 5–1 | Oxford United | 30 January 1963 |
| 30 | Leeds United | 3–1 | Stoke City | 6 March 1963 |
| 31 | Birmingham City | 3–3 | Bury | 5 March 1963 |
| Replay | Bury | 2–0 | Birmingham City | 7 March 1963 |
| 32 | Leyton Orient | 1–1 | Hull City | 11 February 1963 |
| Replay | Hull City | 0–2 | Leyton Orient | 19 February 1963 |

=== Fourth round ===
The matches were originally scheduled for Saturday, 26 January 1963, but due to the earlier, ongoing problems with the winter of 1963, most of the third-round games had still not been played and only one tie, the Burnley – Liverpool match, was able to be played on that day. This and three other games went to replays, with the Portsmouth – Coventry City match requiring a second replay, which was the last match of the round. Gravesend & Northfleet was the last non-league club left in the competition.

| Tie no | Home team | Score | Away team | Date |
|---|---|---|---|---|
| 1 | Burnley | 1–1 | Liverpool | 26 January 1963 |
| Replay | Liverpool | 2–1 | Burnley | 20 February 1963 |
| 2 | Southampton | 3–1 | Watford | 27 February 1963 |
| 3 | Leicester City | 3–1 | Ipswich Town | 30 January 1963 |
| 4 | Middlesbrough | 0–2 | Leeds United | 16 March 1963 |
| 5 | West Bromwich Albion | 0–0 | Nottingham Forest | 6 March 1963 |
| Replay | Nottingham Forest | 2–1 | West Bromwich Albion | 11 March 1963 |
| 6 | Swindon Town | 1–5 | Everton | 29 January 1963 |
| 7 | Manchester City | 1–0 | Bury | 13 March 1963 |
| 8 | Portsmouth | 1–1 | Coventry City | 13 March 1963 |
| Replay | Coventry City | 2–2 | Portsmouth | 16 March 1963 |
| Replay | Portsmouth | 1–2 | Coventry City | 19 March 1963 |
| 9 | West Ham United | 1–0 | Swansea Town | 4 March 1963 |
| 10 | Manchester United | 1–0 | Aston Villa | 11 March 1963 |
| 11 | Norwich City | 5–0 | Newcastle United | 13 March 1963 |
| 12 | Port Vale | 1–2 | Sheffield United | 13 March 1963 |
| 13 | Charlton Athletic | 0–3 | Chelsea | 6 March 1963 |
| 14 | Arsenal | 2–0 | Sheffield Wednesday | 12 March 1963 |
| 15 | Leyton Orient | 3–0 | Derby County | 4 March 1963 |
| 16 | Gravesend & Northfleet | 1–1 | Sunderland | 12 February 1963 |
| Replay | Sunderland | 5–2 | Gravesend & Northfleet | 18 February 1963 |

=== Fifth round ===
The matches were originally scheduled for Saturday, 16 February 1963, but the delays of the matches in the third and fourth rounds prevented the fifth round ties from being played until much later. On 28 January, the FA announced that the draw for the fifth round would be put back a week, and that the league season would be extended until 19 May. Faced with the problem of wishing all the ties to take place on the same date, the FA decided on 4 February 1963 that the fifth and sixth rounds would each be postponed by a week to 23 February and 16 March respectively The following week, on 12 February, the FA again decided, due to the lack of completion of many games, that the fifth and sixth rounds should be postponed The agreed dates, Saturday 16 March and Saturday 30 March respectively, were the final postponements of these two rounds. There were no replays, but the Nottingham Forest and Leeds United match did not take place until the following Tuesday, while the Coventry City – Sunderland game was played on the 25th.

| Tie no | Home team | Score | Away team | Date |
|---|---|---|---|---|
| 1 | Southampton | 1–0 | Sheffield United | 16 March 1963 |
| 2 | Nottingham Forest | 3–0 | Leeds United | 19 March 1963 |
| 3 | Manchester City | 1–2 | Norwich City | 16 March 1963 |
| 4 | Coventry City | 2–1 | Sunderland | 25 March 1963 |
| 5 | West Ham United | 1–0 | Everton | 16 March 1963 |
| 6 | Manchester United | 2–1 | Chelsea | 16 March 1963 |
| 7 | Arsenal | 1–2 | Liverpool | 16 March 1963 |
| 8 | Leyton Orient | 0–1 | Leicester City | 16 March 1963 |

=== Sixth round ===
The four quarter-final ties were scheduled to be played on Saturday, 9 March 1963, but as explained above, were postponed until the 30 March. The Nottingham Forest–Southampton match went to two replays before the tie was settled, in Southampton's favour.

| Tie no | Home team | Score | Away team | Date |
|---|---|---|---|---|
| 1 | Liverpool | 1–0 | West Ham United | 30 March 1963 |
| 2 | Nottingham Forest | 1–1 | Southampton | 30 March 1963 |
| Replay | Southampton | 3–3 | Nottingham Forest | 3 April 1963 |
| Replay | Nottingham Forest | 0–5 | Southampton | 8 April 1963 |
| 3 | Coventry City | 1–3 | Manchester United | 30 March 1963 |
| 4 | Norwich City | 0–2 | Leicester City | 30 March 1963 |

=== Semi-finals ===
The semi-final matches were originally scheduled to be played on Saturday, 30 March 1963. However, due to the problems of completing the earlier rounds due to the particularly inclement weather, on 18 February 1963 the FA Challenge Cup committee announced that the semi-finals would be put back by four weeks to 27 April, and that the final would not be played until three weeks after its original date, on 25 May. Leicester City and Manchester United came through the semi-final round to meet at Wembley.

27 April 1963
15:00

| Leicester City | 1–0 | Liverpool |
|---|---|---|
| Stringfellow 20' | Report |

Hillsborough, Sheffield
Attendance: 65,000
Referee: A. Holland, Barnsley
27 April 1963
15:00

| Manchester United | 1–0 | Southampton |
|---|---|---|
| Law 56' | Report |

Villa Park, Birmingham
Attendance: 65,000
Referee: George McCabe, Sheffield

=== Final ===
The final was played on 25 May 1963 at Wembley Stadium. Manchester United defeated Leicester City 3–1, with goals by Denis Law and David Herd (2). Ken Keyworth scored the Foxes' goal.

==== Match details ====
25 May 1963

| Manchester United | 3–1 | Leicester City |
|---|---|---|
| Law 30'; Herd 57' 85' | | Keyworth 80' |

Wembley, London
Attendance: 99,604
Referee: Ken Aston, London

| Manchester United | Leicester City |
