= Jimmy Gabriel =

Scottish football manager (1940–2021)

Personal information
- Full name: James Gabriel
- Date of birth: 10 October 1940
- Place of birth: Dundee, Scotland
- Date of death: 10 July 2021 (aged 80)
- Place of death: Phoenix, Arizona, U.S.
- Position: Defensive midfielder

Youth career
- Tyneside Boys Club
- Dundee North End

Senior career*
Years	Team	Apps	(Gls)
1957–1960	Dundee	55	(0)
1960–1967	Everton	256	(33)
1967–1972	Southampton	191	(25)
1972–1974	AFC Bournemouth	53	(4)
1973	→ Swindon Town (loan)	6	(0)
1974	Brentford	9	(0)
1974–1979	Seattle Sounders	53	(7)
1981–1982	San Jose Earthquakes (indoor)	7	(0)
Total		630	(69)

International career
1959–1964	Scotland U23	6	(0)
1960	SFL trial v SFA	1	(0)
1960–1963	Scotland	2	(0)

Managerial career
- 1977–1979: Seattle Sounders
- 1980: Phoenix Fire
- 1980–1982: San Jose Earthquakes
- 1985–1988: Seattle Storm
- 1990: Everton (caretaker)
- 1993–1994: Everton (caretaker)
- 1997–2005: Seattle Sounders (assistant)
- * Club domestic league appearances and goals

James Gabriel (10 October 1940 – 10 July 2021) was a Scottish football defensive midfielder and defender who earned two caps with the Scotland national football team. Chiefly associated with English clubs Everton and Southampton, Gabriel played extensively in Scotland and England before ending his career with the Seattle Sounders of the North American Soccer League. He then became a coach in both England and the United States.

== Playing career ==
=== Dundee ===
Jimmy Gabriel first came to the attention of Dundee when he played at right-half for the Scotland under-15 schoolboys in an international at Dens Park. His talent shone through and Dundee manager Willie Thornton snapped him up after the game, despite interest from several other top clubs.

He was initially loaned out to Dundee North End Juniors, but was recalled to Dens Park a year later. He made his debut for Dundee as a 17-year-old on 13 August 1958 in a 2–1 Scottish League Cup victory over Motherwell.

He was to remain a first team regular at Dundee, going on to make 67 appearances. In March 1960, Bob Shankly had taken over as manager at Dundee and, although he wanted to keep Gabriel, was unable to refuse the offer of £27,000 from Everton's manager, Johnny Carey. This made Jimmy the most expensive player to leave Scotland.

=== Everton ===
Gabriel joined Everton after three years at Dundee in March 1960.

He played 304 games for Everton, scoring 37 goals and won two Scottish caps. At Everton he won the First Division title in 1962-63 and the FA Cup in 1966.

By 1967, he was being challenged for his place in the side by Alan Ball and the emerging Howard Kendall. Southampton's manager Ted Bates tried to sign him initially in March 1967 but Gabriel was reluctant to move South. Eventually, when it was clear that Kendall was to be first-choice, Gabriel agreed to sign for the Saints in July, joining them for a fee of £42,500.

=== Southampton ===
At Southampton, Gabriel was a vital part of the defence alongside John McGrath and Denis Hollywood and helped Saints avoid relegation several times. He was a tough defender but had skill to match. He was occasionally drafted in as an emergency striker with some degree of success.

He played a total of 224 matches for the Saints, scoring 27 goals, and was a firm crowd favourite.

=== AFC Bournemouth, Swindon and Brentford ===
He left The Dell at the end of the 1971–72 season to join AFC Bournemouth.

He also spent a short period on loan at Swindon Town before finishing his UK playing career at Brentford.

=== Seattle Sounders ===
In 1974 Gabriel moved to the United States where he joined the Seattle Sounders of the NASL as a player/assistant coach. That season he anchored the Sounders defence and earned second team NASL All Star recognition. In 1976 the Sounders moved to the newly built Kingdome where he scored the first goal in the stadium's history. The goal, a fabulous header off a cross from Tommy Jenkins, his former Southampton teammate, came against Pelé and the New York Cosmos. In 1977, Gabriel replaced John Best as head coach of the Sounders. Even as a coach, he continued to suit up to play, seeing time in two games in 1977 and one in 1979.

=== International ===
Gabriel earned two caps with Scotland and six more with the Scotland under-23 team.

== Managerial career ==
=== Seattle Sounders and San Jose Earthquakes ===
Prior to becoming head coach of the Sounders, Gabriel had acted as an assistant coach and head of the Sounders' reserve team program. When he became head coach he had several Sounder legends including Mike England, Geoff Hurst and Bobby Moore on his team. Under his guidance, Seattle made it to the championship game only to fall to the hated New York Cosmos. He was unable to replicate his first year success and in 1980, the Sounders replaced him with Alan Hinton.

In 1980 he was contracted to coach ASL expansion team the Phoenix Fire, but the team folded in pre-season.

Gabriel then went on to coach George Best and the San Jose Earthquakes (NASL) from 1980 to 1982 for one outdoor season and two indoor seasons. During the 1981–82 indoor season he appeared in a handful of indoor matches for San Jose.

=== AFC Bournemouth and Everton ===
On returning to Britain in 1986, he spent four years as coach of Bournemouth, before going back to Goodison Park in 1990, where he became assistant to Colin Harvey at Everton.

He was briefly caretaker manager of Everton for one game in November 1990 and for seven games between December 1993 and January 1994. According to Yahoo! Sports Gabriel's points per game average of 0.14 from his seven games makes him statistically the least successful manager of the Premier League era with one point from a possible 21 gained.

He continued coaching Everton's reserves until 1997.

=== Back to Seattle ===
Gabriel returned to Seattle in 1997 where he became an assistant to Dean Wurzberger, who played for Gabriel on the Sounders reserve teams in the 1970s, on the Washington Huskies men's and women's teams. Both teams won the 2000 Pac-10 championships. In addition to other players, Jimmy coached Hope Solo. Gabriel was also the coaching director of the Lake Washington Youth Soccer Association and worked in certifying coaches for the State Association. Jimmy provided radio commentary for the Seattle Sounders. He and his wife, Pat, resided in Kirkland, Washington.

Gabriel also served several years as an assistant coach with the Sounders. On 2 October 2005, the Sounders defeated the Richmond Kickers to take the US Second Division championship. On this high note, Gabriel retired from the Sounders.

On 29 March 2009, Gabriel was honoured by the new Seattle Sounders FC MLS club with the "Golden Scarf" award for his services to soccer in Seattle. He received the scarf at a ceremony on the pitch before the Sounders' second game, versus Real Salt Lake.

== Death ==
Gabriel suffered from Alzheimer's disease in the later years of his life. He died on 10 July 2021 in Phoenix, Arizona, aged 80.

== Honours ==
=== Player ===
Everton

- Football League First Division: 1962–63
- FA Cup: 1965–66
- FA Charity Shield: 1963

=== Manager ===
Seattle Sounders

- NASL Championship runner-up: 1977
- NASL Pacific Conference Championship: 1977
- NASL PC Western Division: 1977
