= Brian Harris (footballer) =

English footballer

Personal information
- Date of birth: 16 May 1935
- Place of birth: Bebington, Wirral, Cheshire, England
- Date of death: 17 February 2008 (aged 72)
- Place of death: Chepstow, Wales

Senior career*
Years	Team	Apps	(Gls)
?–1954	Port Sunlight		
1954–1966	Everton	360	(29)
1966–1971	Cardiff City	149	(1)
1971–1974	Newport County	85	(0)

Managerial career
- 1974–1975: Newport County
- Cardiff City (assistant)
- * Club domestic league appearances and goals

Brian Harris (16 May 1935 – 17 February 2008) was an English footballer.

== Playing career ==
Harris started playing for Wirral club Port Sunlight before signing for Everton in 1954 for just a £10 fee. He was regarded as a very versatile player, and during his Everton career played in every position except goalkeeper.

Harris played for 12 years for Everton, notably partnering the more defensively minded Jimmy Gabriel. In the 1962–63 season he lost his place to Tony Kay but regained it the following year as Kay was banned from soccer. Despite this he played in 24 games in Everton's league-winning season, 1962–63, and in the 1966 FA Cup Final, which saw Everton beat Sheffield Wednesday. Five months after the final Harris was sold to Cardiff City, for £10,000. With Cardiff he reached the semi-finals of the European Cup Winners Cup, in 1968.

== Management career ==
Harris went on to play for, and manage, Newport County. Harris also returned to Cardiff to become assistant manager to Richie Morgan, a post he occupied for two years. Following this, Harris was briefly a coach at Ipswich Town before moving to Chepstow, where he worked as a publican, and as manager to non-league Chepstow Town.

Harris died on 17 February 2008 in Chepstow, following a short illness. His funeral service was held at St Luke's, Walton, a church in the corner of Everton's Goodison Park ground.

== Honours ==
Everton

- Football League First Division: 1962–63
- FA Cup: 1965–66

== Sources ==
- Brian Harris at Everton Stats
