= Alex Scott (footballer, born 1936) =

Scottish footballer

Personal information
- Full name: Alexander Silcock Scott
- Date of birth: 22 November 1936
- Place of birth: Falkirk, Scotland
- Date of death: 13 September 2001 (aged 64)
- Place of death: Falkirk, Scotland
- Height: 5 ft 10 in (1.78 m)
- Position: Outside right

Youth career
- Bo'ness United

Senior career*
Years	Team	Apps	(Gls)
1954–1963	Rangers	216	(57)
1963–1967	Everton	149	(23)
1967–1970	Hibernian	40	(2)
1970–1972	Falkirk	23	(0)
Total		428	(82)

International career
1956–1962	Scottish League XI	7	(2)
1956–1966	Scotland	16	(5)
1957	Scotland B	1	(0)
1958	Scotland U23	1	(0)
1958–1959	SFA trial v SFL	2	(0)
1960	SFL trial v SFA	1	(1)
- * Club domestic league appearances and goals

Alexander Silcock Scott (22 November 1936 – 13 September 2001) was a Scottish footballer who played as a right winger.

== Club career ==
Born in Falkirk, Scott started his senior career at Rangers, whom he joined aged 16 in 1954 from Bo'ness United. He scored a hat-trick in his debut against Falkirk at Ibrox while just 19 years old. In nine years with the club he scored 108 goals in 331 matches and won four league titles, one Scottish Cup and two League Cups. He was also part of the Rangers side defeated by Fiorentina in the 1961 UEFA Cup Winners' Cup Final, scoring the Gers' only goal. With Rangers signing Willie Henderson, he moved to Everton in February 1963 for £39,000 and helped them win the Division One title two months later and then the 1963 FA Charity Shield. He also won the FA Cup with the Toffees in 1966.

Scott returned to Scotland when signed by Hibernian for £13,000 in 1967 and finished his career at his hometown club Falkirk between 1970 and 1972. Hibernian used part of the fee they received from Newcastle United for the transfer of Alex's younger brother Jim to finance his signature. The brothers did play together at Falkirk, however, Jim joining several months before Alex's retirement in 1972.

Scott went into business with his brother after his retirement from football. He died in Falkirk in 2001, aged 64.

== International career ==
Scott won 16 caps for Scotland between 1956 and 1966 and was a member of their 1958 FIFA World Cup squad. He also represented his country at B and under-23 level, as well as appearing seven times for the Scottish League.

== Honours ==
Everton

- Football League First Division: 1962–63
- FA Cup: 1965–66
- Charity Shield: 1963

== See also ==
- List of Scotland national football team hat-tricks
