= Harry Catterick =

English footballer and manager (1919–1985)

Personal information
- Date of birth: 26 November 1919
- Place of birth: Darlington, England
- Date of death: 9 March 1985 (aged 65)
- Place of death: Goodison Park, Liverpool, England
- Position: Centre-forward

Youth career
- Stockport County
- Cheadle Heath Nomads

Senior career*
Years	Team	Apps	(Gls)
1946–1951	Everton	59	(19)
1951–1953	Crewe Alexandra	24	(11)

Managerial career
- 1951–1953: Crewe Alexandra
- 1953–1958: Rochdale
- 1958–1961: Sheffield Wednesday
- 1961–1973: Everton
- 1975–1977: Preston North End
- * Club domestic league appearances and goals

Harry Catterick (26 November 1919 – 9 March 1985) was an English football player and manager. As a player Catterick played for Everton and Crewe Alexandra, in a career that was interrupted by World War II. However, he is most notable as a very successful manager. After spells with Crewe, Rochdale and Sheffield Wednesday, with whom he won the Second Division title, Catterick took over at Everton and won the First Division twice and the FA Cup with the Merseyside club. He finished his managerial career at Preston North End.

== Playing career ==
Catterick's father, Harry Catterick Sr, was a footballer and coach for Stockport County. Catterick Jr played at amateur level for Stockport Schoolboys and for Cheadle Heath Nomads before signing part-time for Everton as an 18-year-old in 1937. He was an apprentice marine engine engineer.

However, his professional career coincided with the Second World War so that his opportunities to play were limited. His wartime record with Everton saw him score 55 goals in 71 games. During the war, he also played for Manchester United and Stockport County.

He finally made his league debut in August 1946, aged 26.

== Managerial career ==
=== Sheffield Wednesday ===
Replacing Eric Taylor in 1958, Catterick achieved much success in his three years with Sheffield Wednesday. He led to team to the Second Division title in 1959 and reached the FA Cup semi-final the following season, losing to Blackburn Rovers. The following season, Wednesday were league runners-up to Tottenham Hotspur, who won the Double. Catterick left just before the end of the season following an approach from Everton.

=== Everton ===
Catterick took over from Johnny Carey in April 1961. He soon began to motivate the team and made some astute signings. Under his authoritarian guidance, Everton won the First Division championship in the 1962–63 season and the 1966 FA Cup Final. Although he narrowly lost the 1968 FA Cup Final, the same young team eventually dominated the 1969–70 season, winning the First Division again, one point short of a record points total. Catterick upheld Everton's tradition of cultured, attacking football.

Alex Young had described Catterick as "Hellish" to play for, and on leaving the club in 1968 Young had a gentleman’s agreement for a £1,000 settlement, however when he approached Catterick for the money the manager laughed in his face, and told him "let that be a lesson to you, son: Get everything in writing".

Many tipped Everton to dominate the 1970s under Catterick. However, a dip in the team's morale saw Everton struggle in the league the following season. The sale of Alan Ball to Arsenal in December 1971 came as a surprise to supporters. The struggle by a previously great team seriously affected Catterick's health, and he suffered a severe heart attack on 5 January 1972 near Sheffield after watching the League Cup semi-final between West Ham United and Stoke City. He spent 14 days in hospital in Sheffield, being discharged on 19 January, and returned later that season, but later said that he felt it took him twelve months to fully recover.

He was persuaded to accept a non-executive role at the club on 11 April 1973 by chairman John Moores. He held that role until becoming manager of Preston North End in August 1975. It was a role he remained in up to May 1977. In the Summer of 1977 Catterick wrote to the FA inquiring about the England managerial vacancy but never received a reply. After that Catterick worked as a scout for Southampton under the management of Lawrie MacMenemy.

=== The Shankly rivalry ===
While the manager of rivals Liverpool, Bill Shankly, was an extrovert, Catterick was the opposite, an introvert. He disliked that the press gave information about his team out to the public, even simple details such as the formation. He ensured that the players on the teamsheet were only listed in alphabetical order so that rival managers would not know the lineup.

He also disliked televised games as he wanted to keep Everton's playing style out of the public eye. Shankly was the opposite, welcoming televised matches as he felt it frightened opposing teams.

Catterick once gave an "exclusive" story to a journalist that Everton had missed out on the signing of Preston North End's Howard Kendall and that Kendall had in fact opted to sign for Liverpool. The journalist published the story in the newspaper but hours later Kendall had in fact signed for Everton. It is claimed that Catterick had manipulated the media to score points off the field against Shankly.

== Death ==
Catterick died of a heart attack shortly after watching Everton draw 2–2 with Ipswich Town in an FA Cup Sixth Round match at Goodison Park on 9 March 1985. He was 65 years old. His death came almost exactly five years after former Everton striker Dixie Dean had died while watching a game at the ground, also of a heart attack. Everton won the replay 1–0 and the players wore black armbands in Catterick's memory.

He is buried in the graveyard of St Anne's Church, St Anne's-on-the-Sea, Lancashire, after a funeral held there six days after his death. His gravestone bears the Everton motto, "Nil satis nisi optimum".

== In popular culture ==
Catterick was portrayed by Colin Welland in the 1997 TV film The Fix, which featured the events of the 1964 football betting scandal.

== Managerial statistics ==
Managerial record by team and tenure
Team	From	To	Record				
Team	From	To	P	W	D	L	Win %
Crewe Alexandra	1 December 1951	1 June 1953	75	31	11	33	41.3
Rochdale	1 June 1953	1 May 1958	238	88	58	92	37.0
Sheffield Wednesday	1 August 1958	17 April 1961	138	77	31	30	55.8
Everton	17 April 1961	11 April 1973	597	278	157	162	46.6
Preston North End	27 August 1975	1 May 1977	98	40	24	34	40.8
Total			1,146	514	281	351	44.9

== Honours ==
=== Manager ===
Sheffield Wednesday

- Football League Second Division: 1958–59

Everton

- First Division: 1962–63, 1969–70
- FA Cup: 1965–66
- FA Charity Shield: 1963, 1970

== See also ==
- List of English football championship-winning managers
