= 1959–60 Cardiff City F.C. season =

Welsh football club season

Cardiff City
1959–60 season
- Manager: Bill Jones
- Football League Second Division: 2nd
- FA Cup: 3rd round
- Welsh Cup: Runners-up
- Top goalscorer: League: Derek Tapscott (20); All: Derek Tapscott (21)
- Highest home attendance: 52,364 v Aston Villa, 16 April 1960
- Lowest home attendance: 16,231 v Lincoln City, 13 February 1960
- Average home league attendance: 24,183
Home colours

The 1959–60 season was Cardiff City F.C.'s 33rd season in the Football League. They competed in the 22-team Division Two, then the second tier of English football, finishing second, winning promotion to Division One.

== Players ==
Note: Flags indicate national team as defined under FIFA eligibility rules; some limited exceptions apply. Players may hold more than one non-FIFA nationality.

Pos.	Nation	Player
GK	ENG	Ron Nicholls
GK	WAL	Graham Vearncombe
DF	WAL	Colin Baker
DF	SCO	Danny Malloy
DF	SCO	Alec Milne
DF	WAL	Frank Rankmore
DF	WAL	Ron Stitfall
DF	WAL	Derrick Sullivan
MF	WAL	Alan Durban
MF	WAL	Steve Gammon
MF	WAL	Alan Harrington
MF	WAL	Barrie Hole
MF	WAL	Mike Hughes

Pos.	Nation	Player
MF	WAL	Brian Jenkins
MF	ENG	David Lambert
MF	WAL	Graham Moore
MF	SCO	Bob Scott
MF	ENG	Brian Walsh
FW	ENG	Joe Bonson
FW	WAL	Colin Hudson
FW	ENG	Harry Knowles
FW	SCO	John McMillan
FW	RSA	Steve Mokone
FW	WAL	Derek Tapscott
FW	ENG	Johnny Watkins

== League standings ==
Pos	Team	Pld	W	D	L	GF	GA	GAv	Pts	Qualification or relegation
1	Aston Villa (C, P)	42	25	9	8	89	43	2.070	59	Promotion to the First Division
2	Cardiff City (P)	42	23	12	7	90	62	1.452	58	Promotion to the First Division
3	Liverpool	42	20	10	12	90	66	1.364	50	
4	Sheffield United	42	19	12	11	68	51	1.333	50	
5	Middlesbrough	42	19	10	13	90	64	1.406	48	

Rules for classification: 1) Points; 2) Goal average; 3) Goals scored
(C) Champions; (P) Promoted

=== Results by round ===
Round	1	2	3	4	5	6	7	8	9	10	11	12	13	14	15	16	17	18	19	20	21	22	23	24	25	26	27	28	29	30	31	32	33	34	35	36	37	38	39	40	41	42
Ground	H	H	A	A	H	A	A	H	H	A	A	H	A	H	A	H	A	H	A	H	A	A	H	A	H	A	H	A	A	H	H	A	H	A	H	A	H	A	H	H	A	H
Result	W	W	L	D	W	W	W	W	L	W	D	W	W	W	D	W	D	D	D	W	L	W	W	L	W	W	W	D	D	W	W	W	W	D	L	D	L	W	W	L	D	D
Position			5	5	4	4	3	2	3	2	2	2	2	2	2	2	2	2	3	3	3	3	2	2	2	2	2	2	2	2	1	1	1	1	2	2	2	2	1	2	2	2
Points	2	4	4	5	7	9	11	13	13	15	16	18	20	22	23	25	26	27	28	30	30	32	34	34	36	38	40	41	42	44	46	48	50	51	51	52	52	54	56	56	57	58

Source: Competitive matches
A = Away; H = Home; W = Win; D = Draw; L = Loss

== Fixtures and results ==
=== Second Division ===
22 August 1959 1	Cardiff City	3–2	Liverpool	Cardiff
15:15	Steve Mokone 5'; Graham Moore 48'; Johnny Watkins 60'	LFC report	38', 42' (o.g.) Danny Malloy	Stadium: Ninian Park; Attendance: 23,744; Referee: JW Hunt (Portsmouth)

26 August 1959 2	Cardiff City	2–0	Middlesbrough	Cardiff
18:30	Johnny Watkins 52'; Graham Moore 62'			Stadium: Ninian Park; Attendance: 23,052; Referee: Bill Clements (West Bromwich)

29 August 1959 3	Charlton Athletic	2–1	Cardiff City	London
15:15	John Hewie 83'; Eddie Werge 85'		42' Graham Moore	Stadium: The Valley; Attendance: 18,513; Referee: AE Moore (Norfolk)

2 September 1959 4	Middlesbrough	1–1	Cardiff City	Middlesbrough
	Bill Harris 82' (pen.)		60' Johnny Watkins	Stadium: Ayresome Park; Attendance: 29,122; Referee: Len Howarth

5 September 1959 5	Cardiff City	4–2	Bristol City	Cardiff
15:15	Colin Hudson 4', 18'; Johnny Watkins 19'; Colin Baker 24'		37' John Atyeo; 67' Wally Hinshelwood	Stadium: Ninian Park; Attendance: 22,545; Referee: Jack Taylor (Wolverhampton)

9 September 1959 6	Derby County	1–2	Cardiff City	Derby
19:00	Ray Swallow 68'		21', 47' Derrick Sullivan	Stadium: Baseball Ground; Attendance: 17,959; Referee: Ken Dagnall (Blackburn)

12 September 1959 7	Scunthorpe United	1–2	Cardiff City	Scunthorpe
15:15	Jack Haigh 28'		1' Johnny Watkins; 42' Graham Moore	Stadium: Old Show Ground; Attendance: 10,933; Referee: J Parkinson

16 September 1959 8	Cardiff City	2–0	Derby County	Cardiff
17:45	Derrick Sullivan; Colin Baker			Stadium: Ninian Park; Attendance: 21,548; Referee: Eric Jennings

19 September 1959 9	Cardiff City	1–4	Rotherham United	Cardiff
15:15	Derrick Sullivan 7'		28' Brian Sawyer; 37', 69' Barry Webster; 54' (o.g.) Danny Malloy (footballer)	Stadium: Ninian Park; Attendance: 24,392; Referee: RH Mann (Worcester)

26 September 1959 10	Lincoln City	2–3	Cardiff City	Lincoln
15:00	John McClelland 21'; Roy Chapman		14' Derrick Sullivan; 58' Johnny Watkins; 71' Alan Harrington	Stadium: Sincil Bank; Attendance: 8,401; Referee: AW Luty

3 October 1959 11	Hull City	0–0	Cardiff City	Hull
15:00				Stadium: Boothferry Park; Attendance: 14,933; Referee: FH Gerrard (Preston)

10 October 1959 12	Cardiff City	5–1	Leyton Orient	Cardiff
15:15	Graham Moore 9', 12'; Derek Tapscott 53', 65'; Derrick Sullivan 74'		80' Tommy Johnston	Stadium: Ninian Park; Attendance: 18,794; Referee: Peter Brandwood (Kidderminster)

17 October 1959 13	Huddersfield Town	0–1	Cardiff City	Huddersfield
			Derek Tapscott	Stadium: Leeds Road; Attendance: 18,367

24 October 1959 14	Cardiff City	3–2	Ipswich Town	Cardiff
15:00	Colin Baker 18'; Derek Tapscott 34'; Derrick Sullivan 35'		36' Colin Lundstrum; 62' Jimmy Leadbetter	Stadium: Ninian Park; Attendance: 20,233; Referee: GW Thorpe (Swindon)

31 October 1959 15	Bristol Rovers	1–1	Cardiff City	Bristol
	Alfie Biggs 32'		18' Graham Moore	Stadium: Eastville; Attendance: 27,630; Referee: J Mitchell

7 November 1959 16	Cardiff City	2–1	Swansea Town	Cardiff
14:45	Derrick Sullivan; Joe Bonson		Colin Webster	Stadium: Ninian Park; Attendance: 34,881; Referee: Harold Horner (Coventry)

14 November 1959 17	Brighton & Hove Albion	2–2	Cardiff City	Brighton
14:45	Jack Bertolini 60'; Bill Curry 88'		70', 82' Joe Bonson	Stadium: Goldstone Ground; Attendance: 16,253; Referee: Ken Aston (Ilford)

21 November 1959 18	Cardiff City	4–4	Stoke City	Cardiff
14:30	Derek Tapscott 14'; Joe Bonson 28', 61'; Steve Gammon 82'		3' Doug Newlands; 31', 35' Johnny King; 54' Frank Bowyer	Stadium: Ninian Park; Attendance: 21,793; Referee: CH Dennis (Ashtead)

28 November 1959 19	Portsmouth	1–1	Cardiff City	Portsmouth
15:00	Ron Saunders		Brian Walsh	Stadium: Fratton Park; Attendance: 14,018; Referee: TW Dawes (Norwich)

5 December 1959 20	Cardiff City	2–1	Sunderland	Cardiff
14:30	Johnny Watkins 3'; Derek Tapscott 78'		41' Ian Lawther	Stadium: Ninian Park; Attendance: 20,016; Referee: Les Hamer (Chorley)

12 December 1959 21	Aston Villa	2–0	Cardiff City	Birmingham
15:00	Jimmy Adam; Gerry Hitchens			Stadium: Villa Park; Attendance: 50,039; Referee: H Webb (Leeds)

19 December 1959 22	Liverpool	0–4	Cardiff City	Liverpool
15:15		LFC report	12' Derek Tapscott; 57' Derek Tapscott; 34' Johnny Watkins; 67' Joe Bonson	Stadium: Anfield; Attendance: 27,291; Referee: Arthur Hawcroft (Rotherham)
Note: This was Bill Shankly's first game as Liverpool manager

26 December 1959 23	Cardiff City	2–0	Sheffield United	Cardiff
14:30	Joe Bonson 32'; Derek Tapscott 63'			Stadium: Ninian Park; Attendance: 29,515; Referee: GW Pullin

28 December 1959 24	Sheffield United	2–1	Cardiff City	Sheffield
19:00	Gerry Summers 28'; Dennis Shiels 43'		17' Derek Tapscott	Stadium: Bramall Lane; Attendance: 18,590; Referee: AW Sparling (Grimsby)

2 January 1960 25	Cardiff City	5–1	Charlton Athletic	Cardiff
14:30	Colin Baker 40', 65'; Derek Tapscott 56'; Joe Bonson 58'; Brian Walsh 82'		47' Jim Fryatt	Stadium: Ninian Park; Attendance: 20,619; Referee: Jim Finney (Hereford)

16 January 1960 26	Bristol City	0–3	Cardiff City	Bristol
15:00			43' Joe Bonson; 52' (o.g.) Peter McCall; 89' Graham Moore	Stadium: Ashton Gate; Attendance: 18,184; Referee: Frank Cowen

23 January 1960 27	Cardiff City	4–2	Scunthorpe United	Cardiff
14:45	Johnny Watkins 9'; Joe Bonson 16'; Derek Tapscott 17'; Graham Moore 30'		38' Barrie Thomas; 47' Harry Middleton	Stadium: Ninian Park; Attendance: 16,759; Referee: Bill Clements (West Bromwich)

30 January 1960 28	Plymouth Argyle	1–1	Cardiff City	Plymouth
15:15	Alec Milne 8' (o.g.)	Plymouth report	80' Derek Tapscott	Stadium: Home Park; Attendance: 21,923; Referee: David Smith (Stonehouse)

6 February 1960 29	Rotherham United	2–2	Cardiff City	Rotherham
15:00	Billy Myerscough 30', 82' (pen.)		15', 32' Derek Tapscott	Stadium: Millmoor; Attendance: 16,525; Referee: Walter Crossley (Lancaster)

13 February 1960 30	Cardiff City	6–2	Lincoln City	Cardiff
15:00	Joe Bonson 7', 30'; Johnny Watkins 6', 25'; Derek Tapscott 52'; Brian Walsh 57'		61' Mike Commons; 74' John McClelland	Stadium: Ninian Park; Attendance: 16,231; Referee: Jim Pickles (Stockport)

20 February 1960 31	Cardiff City	3–2	Hull City	Cardiff
15:00	Johnny Watkins 7'; Joe Bonson 15', 50'		45' Colin Smith; 65' Ralph Gubbins	Stadium: Ninian Park; Attendance: 21,580; Referee: CH Sant (Crewe)

27 February 1960 32	Leyton Orient	3–4	Cardiff City	London
15:15	Tommy Johnston 10', 28'; Terry McDonald 89'		41', 85' Derek Tapscott; 52', 70' Joe Bonson	Stadium: Brisbane Road; Attendance: 22,918; Referee: FH Gerrard (Preston)

5 March 1960 33	Cardiff City	2–1	Huddersfield Town	Cardiff
15:15	Graham Moore 44'; Johnny Watkins 65'		21' Chris Balderstone	Stadium: Ninian Park; Attendance: 32,733; Referee: Ken Aston (Ilford)

12 March 1960 34	Ipswich Town	1–1	Cardiff City	Ipswich
	John Elsworthy 23'		43' Joe Bonson	Stadium: Portman Road; Attendance: 18,776; Referee: JG Williams

19 March 1960 35	Cardiff City	1–4	Portsmouth	Cardiff
15:15	Derek Tapscott 30'		11' Harry Harris; 27' Ron Saunders; 40', 47' Ron Newman	Stadium: Ninian Park; Attendance: 21,011; Referee: GW Thorpe (Swindon)

26 March 1960 36	Swansea Town	3–3	Cardiff City	Swansea
16:30	Brayley Reynolds 60', 66'; Dixie Hale 64'		10' Joe Bonson; 32' Graham Moore; 52' Brian Walsh	Stadium: Vetch Field; Attendance: 24,004; Referee: DW Smith

2 April 1960 37	Cardiff City	1–4	Brighton & Hove Albion	Cardiff
15:15	Derek Tapscott 37'		24', 73' Bill Curry; 39' Dennis Gordon; 39' Adrian Thorne	Stadium: Ninian Park; Attendance: 19,523; Referee: JS McLoughlin (Manchester)

9 April 1960 38	Stoke City	0–1	Cardiff City	Stoke
			52' Johnny Watkins	Stadium: Victoria Ground; Attendance: 9,548; Referee: JE Carr (Sheffield)

16 April 1960 39	Cardiff City	1–0	Aston Villa	Cardiff
15:15	Graham Moore 12'			Stadium: Ninian Park; Attendance: 52,364; Referee: Charles Rogers (Greenford)

19 April 1960 40	Cardiff City	0–1	Plymouth Argyle	Cardiff
18:15			Wilf Carter	Stadium: Ninian Park; Attendance: 28,890; Referee: Peter Brandwood (Kidderminster)

23 April 1960 41	Sunderland	1–1	Cardiff City	Sunderland
15:00	Ambrose Fogarty 15'		45' Colin Baker	Stadium: Roker Park; Attendance: 20,663; Referee: J Bellwood (Liversedge)

30 April 1960 42	Cardiff City	2–2	Bristol Rovers	Cardiff
15:15	Graham Moore; Johnny Watkins		26', 49' Dai Ward	Stadium: Ninian Park; Attendance: 17,624; Referee: FH Gerrard (Preston)

=== FA Cup ===
9 January 1960 Round 3	Cardiff City	0–2	Port Vale	Cardiff
14:15			Stan Steele; Cliff Portwood	Stadium: Ninian Park; Attendance: 25,500; Referee: George McCabe (Sheffield)

=== Welsh Cup ===
20 January 1960 Round 5	Cardiff City	5–0	Lovell's Athletic	Cardiff
14:45	Graham Moore; Joe Bonson; Johnny Watkins; Derek Tapscott; Derek Tapscott			Stadium: Ninian Park; Attendance: 2,500; Referee: L Owen (Blackwood)

25 February 1960 Round 6	Swansea Town	1–2	Cardiff City	Swansea
15:00	Brayley Reynolds		Harry Knowles (o.g.) Alan Woods	Stadium: Vetch Field; Attendance: 11,000; Referee: RE Smith (Newport)

28 March 1960 Semi Final	Bangor City	1–1	Cardiff City	Wrexham
19:15	Goal		Graham Moore	Stadium: The Racecourse; Attendance: 3,600

25 April 1960 Semi Final (Replay)	Bangor City	1–4	Cardiff City	Newport
18:15	Goal		Brian Jenkins (pen.) Brian Jenkins; Graham Moore; Steve Mokone	Stadium: Somerton Park; Attendance: 2,500

2 May 1960 Final	Cardiff City	1–1	Wrexham	Cardiff
18:30	Brian Jenkins 51'	Wrexham report	73' Ron Harbertson	Stadium: Ninian Park; Attendance: 11,172; Referee: Leo Callaghan (Merthyr Tydfil)

5 May 1960 Final Replay	Wrexham	1–0	Cardiff City	Wrexham
18:30	Arfon Griffiths 30'	Wrexham report		Stadium: The Racecourse; Attendance: 5,800; Referee: Leo Callaghan (Merthyr Tydfil)

== See also ==
- List of Cardiff City F.C. seasons
