= 1957–58 Cardiff City F.C. season =

Welsh football club season

Cardiff City
1957–58 season
- Manager: Trevor Morris
- Football League Second Division: 15th
- FA Cup: 5th round
- Welsh Cup: 5th round
- Top goalscorer: League: Ron Hewitt (14); All: Ron Hewitt (15)
- Highest home attendance: 42,482 v Swansea Town 24 August 1957
- Lowest home attendance: 5,867 v Bristol Rovers 26 March 1958
- Average home league attendance: 15,893
Home colours

The 1957–58 season was Cardiff City F.C.'s 31st season in the Football League. They competed in the 22-team Division Two, then the second tier of English football, finishing fifteenth.

== Players ==
Note: Flags indicate national team as defined under FIFA eligibility rules; some limited exceptions apply. Players may hold more than one non-FIFA nationality.

Pos.	Nation	Player
GK	WAL	Alan Jones
GK	WAL	Ken Jones
GK	WAL	Graham Vearncombe
DF	WAL	Colin Baker
DF	WAL	Ray Daniel
DF	WAL	Ron Davies
DF	WAL	John Frowen
DF	SCO	Alick Gray
DF	SCO	Danny Malloy
DF	SCO	Alec Milne
DF	WAL	Frank Rankmore
DF	ENG	Charles Rutter
DF	WAL	Ron Stitfall
DF	WAL	Derrick Sullivan

Pos.	Nation	Player
MF	WAL	Alan Harrington
MF	WAL	Brian Jenkins
MF	SCO	George McGuckin
MF	SCO	Ross Menzies
MF	ENG	Cliff Nugent
MF	SCO	Bob Scott
MF	WAL	Ken Tucker
MF	ENG	Brian Walsh
FW	ENG	Joe Bonson
FW	ENG	Ron Hewitt
FW	ENG	Gerry Hitchens
FW	WAL	Colin Hudson
FW	SCO	John McMillan
FW	ENG	Johnny Nicholls
FW	WAL	Brayley Reynolds

== League standings ==
Pos	Team	Pld	W	D	L	GF	GA	GAv	Pts
13	Grimsby Town	42	17	6	19	86	83	1.036	40
14	Barnsley	42	14	12	16	70	74	0.946	40
15	Cardiff City	42	14	9	19	63	77	0.818	37
16	Derby County	42	14	8	20	60	81	0.741	36
17	Bristol City	42	13	9	20	63	88	0.716	35

Rules for classification: 1) Points; 2) Goal average; 3) Goals scored

=== Results by round ===
Round	1	2	3	4	5	6	7	8	9	10	11	12	13	14	15	16	17	18	19	20	21	22	23	24	25	26	27	28	29	30	31	32	33	34	35	36	37	38	39	40	41	42
Ground	H	A	A	H	H	H	A	A	H	A	H	H	A	H	A	A	H	A	H	A	H	A	A	H	H	A	H	A	H	A	H	A	H	H	H	A	A	H	A	A	H	A
Result	D	D	L	L	L	W	L	D	L	W	D	W	W	W	L	L	D	L	D	D	W	L	W	W	W	L	D	L	W	L	W	L	L	W	L	W	L	L	D	L	W	L
Position			18	20	21	18	20	18	22	20	21	19	14	12	14	14	13	17	16	16	14	14	14	15	13	14	14	15	14	15	15	15	15	15	15	15	15	15	16	16	15	15
Points	1	2	2	2	2	4	4	5	5	7	8	10	12	14	14	14	15	15	16	17	19	19	21	23	25	25	26	26	28	28	30	30	30	32	32	34	34	34	35	35	37	37

Source: Competitive matches
A = Away; H = Home; W = Win; D = Draw; L = Loss

== Fixtures and results ==
=== Second Division ===
24 August 1957 1	Cardiff City	0–0	Swansea Town	Cardiff
15:15				Stadium: Ninian Park; Attendance: 42,482; Referee: RH Mann (Worcester)

27 August 1957 2	Grimsby Town	1–1	Cardiff City	Grimsby
18:30	Billy Evans		(o.g.) Malcolm Tucker	Stadium: Blundell Park; Attendance: 18,429; Referee: Arthur Holland (Barnsley)

31 August 1957 3	Liverpool	3–0	Cardiff City	Liverpool
15:15	Jimmy Melia 2'; Billy Liddell 4'; Danny Malloy 65' (o.g.)	LFC report		Stadium: Anfield; Attendance: 45,698; Referee: M McCoy (Doncaster)

4 September 1957 4	Cardiff City	1–3	Grimsby Town	Cardiff
18:30	Johnny Nicholls		Ron Rafferty; Jimmy Fell; Billy Evans	Stadium: Ninian Park; Attendance: 13,433; Referee: George Pullin (Bristol)

7 September 1957 5	Cardiff City	0–2	Middlesbrough	Cardiff
15:15			28', 88' Brian Clough	Stadium: Ninian Park; Attendance: 14,013; Referee: ER Hill (Chester)

11 September 1957 6	Cardiff City	1–0	Huddersfield Town	Cardiff
18:00	Ron Davies			Stadium: Ninian Park; Attendance: 10,073; Referee: Alf Bond (Fulham)

14 September 1957 7	Leyton Orient	4–2	Cardiff City	London
	Alec Milne (o.g.); Tommy Johnston (?); Len Julians		Ron Davies; Cliff Nugent	Stadium: Brisbane Road; Attendance: 16,719

18 September 1957 8	Huddersfield Town	1–1	Cardiff City	Huddersfield
	Colin Baker (o.g.)		Brayley Reynolds	Stadium: Leeds Road; Attendance: 9,821

21 September 1957 9	Cardiff City	0–3	Charlton Athletic	Cardiff
15:15			14' Billy Kiernan; 68' Dennis Allen; 78' Stuart Leary	Stadium: Ninian Park; Attendance: 14,439; Referee: John Kelly (Eccleston)

28 September 1957 10	Doncaster Rovers	0–1	Cardiff City	Doncaster
15:15			Ron Davies	Stadium: Belle Vue; Attendance: 9,909; Referee: AW Sparling (Grimsby)

5 October 1957 11	Cardiff City	2–2	Rotherham United	Cardiff
15:00	Brian Walsh; Ron Hewitt 70' (pen.)		7' Terry Farmer; 16' (o.g.) Alec Milne	Stadium: Ninian Park; Attendance: 14,390; Referee: W Hickson

12 October 1957 12	Cardiff City	3–2	Derby County	Cardiff
15:00	Gerry Hitchens; Ron Hewitt; Brian Walsh		George Darwin; Jack Parry	Stadium: Ninian Park; Attendance: 15,513

19 October 1957 13	Bristol Rovers	0–2	Cardiff City	Bristol
15:00			(20s) Gerry Hitchens; Gerry Hitchens	Stadium: Eastville; Attendance: 29,366; Referee: Frank Cowen (Manchester)

26 October 1957 14	Cardiff City	3–2	Lincoln City	Cardiff
15:00	Ron Hewitt; Cliff Nugent; Brayley Reynolds		Bert Linnecor; Tommy Northcott	Stadium: Ninian Park; Attendance: 14,515; Referee: Peter Brandwood (Kidderminster)

2 November 1957 15	Notts County	5–2	Cardiff City	Nottingham
	Stan Newsham (?); Gordon Wills (?); Jackie Lane		Brayley Reynolds; Johnny Nicholls	Stadium: Meadow Lane; Attendance: 14,911; Referee: FB Coultas (Hull)

4 November 1957 16	Stoke City	3–0	Cardiff City	Stoke
	Neville Coleman; Neville Coleman; Frank Bowyer			Stadium: Victoria Ground; Attendance: 20,016; Referee: Jack Clough (Bolton)

9 November 1957 17	Cardiff City	1–1	Ipswich Town	Cardiff
14:45	Joe Bonson 49'		44' Tom Garneys	Stadium: Ninian Park; Attendance: 16,490; Referee: Norman Taylor (Westbury)

16 November 1957 18	Blackburn Rovers	4–0	Cardiff City	Blackburn
	Peter Dobing 28' (?); Ronnie Clayton 30'; Ally MacLeod 43'			Stadium: Ewood Park; Attendance: 24,642; Referee: Ken Collinge (Sale, Cheshire)

23 November 1957 19	Cardiff City	0–0	Sheffield United	Cardiff
14:30				Stadium: Ninian Park; Attendance: 15,215

30 November 1957 20	West Ham United	1–1	Cardiff City	London
14:15	John Dick 58'		89' Joe Bonson	Stadium: Upton Park; Attendance: 23,954; Referee: L Howarth (Beverley)

7 December 1957 21	Cardiff City	7–0	Barnsley	Cardiff
14:30	Joe Bonson 5'; Ron Hewitt 31' (pen.), 66'; Colin Hudson 43'; Cliff Nugent 55', 79', 88'			Stadium: Ninian Park; Attendance: 8,941; Referee: RH Mann (Worcester)

14 December 1957 22	Fulham	2–0	Cardiff City	London
14:15	Jimmy Hill; Danny Malloy (o.g.)			Stadium: Craven Cottage; Attendance: 16,024; Referee: R Wood (County Durham)

21 December 1957 23	Swansea Town	0–1	Cardiff City	Swansea
14:30			35' Colin Hudson	Stadium: Vetch Field; Attendance: 19,483; Referee: Norman Taylor (Westbury)

26 December 1957 24	Cardiff City	5–2	Stoke City	Cardiff
14:30	Colin Hudson; Joe Bonson; Joe Bonson; Brayley Reynolds; Brian Walsh		George Kelly; George Kelly	Stadium: Ninian Park; Attendance: 23,638; Referee: Gilbert Pullin (Bristol)

28 December 1957 25	Cardiff City	6–1	Liverpool	Cardiff
14:30	Colin Hudson 5'; Ron Hewitt 17'; Brayley Reynolds 31', 44'; Joe Bonson 34', 77'	LFC report	88' Johnny Wheeler	Stadium: Ninian Park; Attendance: 30,622; Referee: Peter Brandwood (Kidderminster)

11 January 1958 26	Middlesbrough	4–1	Cardiff City	Middlesbrough
	Alan Peacock 43', 70', 81'; Bill Harris 47' (pen.)		48' Brian Walsh	Stadium: Ayresome Park; Attendance: 23,115; Referee: Ken Collinge (Sale)

18 January 1958 27	Cardiff City	1–1	Leyton Orient	Cardiff
14:45	Ron Hewitt 28'		10' Len Julians	Stadium: Ninian Park; Attendance: 13,987; Referee: Jim Pickles (Stockport)

1 February 1958 28	Charlton Athletic	3–1	Cardiff City	London
	Buck Ryan 12', 50'; Johnny Summers 69'		Cliff Nugent	Stadium: The Valley; Attendance: 20,556; Referee: Bruce Buckle(Northampton)

8 February 1958 29	Cardiff City	3–1	Doncaster Rovers	Cardiff
15:00	Brian Walsh; Cliff Nugent; Ron Hewitt		43' Johnny Mooney	Stadium: Ninian Park; Attendance: 13,277; Referee: Ken Aston (Ilford, Essex)

22 February 1958 30	Sheffield United	3–0	Cardiff City	Sheffield
15:00	Derek Pace (?); Kevin Lewis			Stadium: Bramall Lane; Attendance: 19,368; Referee: ER Hill (Chester)

15 March 1958 31	Cardiff City	2–0	Notts County	Cardiff
15:15	Ron Hewitt 10'; Joe Bonson 61'			Stadium: Ninian Park; Attendance: 11,116; Referee: FH Gerrard (Preston)

22 March 1958 32	Ipswich Town	3–1	Cardiff City	Ipswich
15:00	Derek Rees 5', 76'; Tom Garneys 38'		25' Joe Bonson	Stadium: Portman Road; Attendance: 13,469; Referee: DT Blues (Richmond)

26 March 1958 33	Cardiff City	0–2	Bristol Rovers	Cardiff
17:00			Geoff Bradford; Peter Hooper	Stadium: Ninian Park; Attendance: 5,867; Referee: JS McLoughlin (Manchester)

29 March 1958 34	Cardiff City	4–3	Blackburn Rovers	Cardiff
15:15	Ron Hewitt 8' (?), 68'; Joe Bonson		13' Bryan Douglas; Tommy Johnston; (o.g.) Colin Baker	Stadium: Ninian Park; Attendance: 10,335; Referee: NC Taylor (Westbury)

4 April 1958 35	Cardiff City	2–3	Bristol City	Cardiff
15:15	Ron Hewitt 4', 5'		22' Bobby Etheridge; 36' John Atyeo; 89' Bert Tindill	Stadium: Ninian Park; Attendance: 15,567

5 April 1958 36	Derby County	0–2	Cardiff City	Derby
15:00			Joe Bonson; Brian Jenkins	Stadium: Baseball Ground; Attendance: 15,529

7 April 1958 37	Bristol City	2–0	Cardiff City	Bristol
15:00	Bobby Etheridge 59'; John Atyeo 61'			Stadium: Ashton Gate; Attendance: 25,723

12 April 1958 38	Cardiff City	0–3	West Ham United	Cardiff
15:15			7' Andy Malcolm; 41', 85' John Dick	Stadium: Ninian Park; Attendance: 17,996; Referee: Ken Dagnall (Blackburn)

19 April 1958 39	Barnsley	1–1	Cardiff City	Barnsley
15:15	Bobby Wood 60'		75' Colin Hudson	Stadium: Oakwell; Attendance: 8,948; Referee: RPE Langdale (Darlington)

21 April 1958 40	Rotherham United	3–1	Cardiff City	Rotherham
	Brian Jackson; Brian Jackson; Roy Lambert		Brian Walsh	Stadium: Millmoor; Attendance: 8,147

26 April 1958 41	Cardiff City	3–0	Fulham	Cardiff
15:15	Colin Baker 6'; Derrick Sullivan 6', 84'			Stadium: Ninian Park; Attendance: 11,846

30 April 1958 42	Lincoln City	3–1	Cardiff City	Lincoln
18:30	Roy Chapman 69', 74'; Ron Harbertson 79'		Cliff Nugent	Stadium: Sincil Bank; Attendance: 18,001; Referee: Ken Collinge (Worcester)

=== FA Cup ===
4 January 1958 Round 3	Leeds United	1–2	Cardiff City	Leeds
	Bobby Forrest 41'		Alan Harrington; 44' Cliff Nugent	Stadium: Elland Road; Attendance: 30,374; Referee: Denis Howell (Birmingham)

25 January 1958 Round 4	Cardiff City	4–1	Leyton Orient	Cardiff
14:45	Sid Bishop (o.g.); Brian Walsh; Joe Bonson; Joe Bonson		Len Julians	Stadium: Ninian Park; Attendance: 35,849; Referee: F Collinge (Rochdale)

15 February 1958 Round 5	Cardiff City	0–0	Blackburn Rovers	Cardiff
15:00				Stadium: Ninian Park; Attendance: 45,580; Referee: Les Tirebuck (Halifax)

20 February 1958 Round 5 (Replay)	Blackburn Rovers	2–1	Cardiff City	Blackburn
	Bryan Douglas; Mick McGrath		Ron Hewitt	Stadium: Ewood Park; Attendance: 27,000; Referee: Les Tirebuck (Halifax)

=== Welsh Cup ===
29 January 1958 Round 5	Cardiff City	0–2	Hereford United	Cardiff
			Goal	Stadium: Ninian Park; Attendance: 1,500

== See also ==
- List of Cardiff City F.C. seasons
