= 1958–59 Cardiff City F.C. season =

Welsh football club season

Cardiff City
1958–59 season
- Manager: Bill Jones
- Football League Second Division: 9th
- FA Cup: 4th round
- Welsh Cup: Winners
- Top goalscorer: League: Ron Hewitt (13); All: Ron Hewitt (17)
- Highest home attendance: 27,146 v Bristol City 27 December 1958
- Lowest home attendance: 10,374 v Sunderland 22 April 1959
- Average home league attendance: 17,759
Home colours

The 1958–59 season was Cardiff City F.C.'s 32nd season in the Football League. They competed in the 22-team Division Two, then the second tier of English football, finishing ninth.

== Players ==
Note: Flags indicate national team as defined under FIFA eligibility rules; some limited exceptions apply. Players may hold more than one non-FIFA nationality.

No.	Pos.	Nation	Player
--	GK	WAL	Alan Jones
--	GK	WAL	Ken Jones
--	GK	ENG	Ron Nicholls
--	GK	WAL	Graham Vearncombe
--	DF	WAL	Colin Baker
--	DF	ENG	George Bell
--	DF	SCO	Alick Gray
--	DF	SCO	Danny Malloy
--	DF	SCO	Alec Milne
--	DF	WAL	Frank Rankmore
--	DF	WAL	Ron Stitfall
--	DF	WAL	Derrick Sullivan
--	MF	WAL	Steve Gammon
--	MF	WAL	Alan Harrington
--	MF	WAL	Mike Hughes

No.	Pos.	Nation	Player
--	MF	WAL	Brian Jenkins
--	MF	SCO	Ross Menzies
--	MF	WAL	Graham Moore
--	MF	ENG	Cliff Nugent
--	MF	SCO	Bob Scott
--	MF	ENG	Brian Walsh
--	FW	ENG	Joe Bonson
--	FW	ENG	Ron Hewitt
--	FW	ENG	Colin Hudson
--	FW	SCO	George Kelly
--	FW	ENG	Harry Knowles
--	FW	SCO	John McMillan
--	FW	WAL	Brayley Reynolds
--	FW	WAL	Derek Tapscott

== League standings ==
Pos	Team	Pld	W	D	L	GF	GA	GAv	Pts
7	Derby County	42	20	8	14	74	71	1.042	48
8	Charlton Athletic	42	18	7	17	92	90	1.022	43
9	Cardiff City	42	18	7	17	65	65	1.000	43
10	Bristol City	42	17	7	18	74	70	1.057	41
11	Swansea Town	42	16	9	17	79	81	0.975	41

Rules for classification: 1) Points; 2) Goal average; 3) Goals scored

=== Results by round ===
Round	1	2	3	4	5	6	7	8	9	10	11	12	13	14	15	16	17	18	19	20	21	22	23	24	25	26	27	28	29	30	31	32	33	34	35	36	37	38	39	40	41	42
Ground	H	A	A	H	H	A	A	H	H	A	H	H	H	A	H	A	H	H	A	A	A	A	H	H	H	A	H	A	A	H	A	H	A	A	H	H	A	A	H	H	A	A
Result	L	L	L	W	W	L	D	L	W	W	W	L	W	W	W	L	D	W	W	L	L	W	W	W	W	L	W	D	L	L	W	D	D	D	L	L	L	W	L	W	L	D
Position			22	20	13	14	18	18	16	13	9	13	11	9	8	10	10	10	10	10	10	9	8	8	6	7	7	7	8	9	8	8	9	9	10	10	9	9	9	8	9	9
Points	0	0	0	2	4	4	5	5	7	9	11	11	13	15	17	17	18	20	22	22	22	24	26	28	30	30	32	33	33	33	35	36	37	38	38	38	38	40	40	42	42	43

Source: Competitive matches
A = Away; H = Home; W = Win; D = Draw; L = Loss

== Fixtures and results ==
=== Second Division ===
23 August 1958 1	Cardiff City	0–1	Barnsley	Cardiff
15:15			89' Malcolm Graham	Stadium: Ninian Park; Attendance: 23,731; Referee: Eric Jennings (Stourbridge)

27 August 1958 2	Huddersfield Town	3–0	Cardiff City	Huddersfield
	Danny Malloy (o.g.); Les Massie; Derek Hawksworth			Stadium: Leeds Road; Attendance: 13,267

30 August 1958 3	Rotherham United	1–0	Cardiff City	Rotherham
15:00	Barry Webster 73'			Stadium: Millmoor; Attendance: 11,474; Referee: Ken Stokes (Newark)

3 September 1958 4	Cardiff City	3–2	Huddersfield Town	Cardiff
18:15	Colin Baker; Brian Walsh (pen.); Cliff Nugent		Derek Hawksworth (pen.) Derek Hawksworth	Stadium: Ninian Park; Attendance: 13,078; Referee: Bill Clements (West Bromwich)

6 September 1958 5	Cardiff City	3–1	Sheffield United	Cardiff
15:15	George Kelly 40', 89'; Brayley Reynolds 71'		68' Derek Pace	Stadium: Ninian Park; Attendance: 16,079; Referee: ER Hill (Chester)

8 September 1958 6	Bristol Rovers	2–0	Cardiff City	Bristol
	Geoff Bradford; Dai Ward			Stadium: Eastville; Attendance: 20,579; Referee: Peter Brandwood (Kidderminster)

13 September 1958 7	Brighton & Hove Albion	2–2	Cardiff City	Brighton
15:15	John Shepherd 30'; Glen Wilson 42' (pen.)		34' Ron Hewitt; 90' Graham Moore	Stadium: Goldstone Ground; Attendance: 26,662; Referee: Ken Aston (Ilford)

17 September 1958 8	Cardiff City	2–4	Bristol Rovers	Cardiff
18:00	Ron Hewitt; Graham Moore		Dai Ward; Geoff Bradford; Alfie Biggs (pen.) Peter Hooper	Stadium: Ninian Park; Attendance: 14,495; Referee: JJ Baxter (Royston)

20 September 1958 9	Cardiff City	4–1	Grimsby Town	Cardiff
15:15	Joe Bonson 17'; Brian Jenkins 24'; Ron Hewitt 26', 47'		61' Mick Cullen	Stadium: Ninian Park; Attendance: 15,646

27 September 1958 10	Liverpool	1–2	Cardiff City	Liverpool
15:15	Alan Banks 5'	Liverpool report	28' Joe Bonson; 31' Ron Hewitt	Stadium: Anfield; Attendance: 41,866; Referee: LN Peake (Rotherham)

4 October 1958 11	Cardiff City	3–2	Middlesbrough	Cardiff
15:15	Brian Jenkins 35'; Ron Hewitt 55'; Brian Walsh 56'		71' Alan Peacock; 81' Brian Phillips	Stadium: Ninian Park; Attendance: 20,560; Referee: Ken Collinge (Worcester)

11 October 1958 12	Cardiff City	1–2	Ipswich Town	Cardiff
15:15	Derek Tapscott 13'		64' Doug Millward; 71' Ray Crawford	Stadium: Ninian Park; Attendance: 20,357; Referee: Ken Dagnall (Blackburn)

25 October 1958 13	Cardiff City	2–1	Stoke City	Cardiff
15:00	Ron Stitfall 29'; Derek Tapscott 55'		72' Johnny King	Stadium: Ninian Park; Attendance: 18,359; Referee: HJ Husband (London)

1 November 1958 14	Derby County	1–3	Cardiff City	Derby
15:00	Geoff Barrowcliffe 27'		12' Brayley Reynolds; 30' (pen.) Ron Hewitt; 31' Brian Walsh	Stadium: Baseball Ground; Attendance: 17,532; Referee: H Haworth

8 November 1958 15	Cardiff City	3–0	Lincoln City	Cardiff
14:45	Ron Hewitt 33'; Brian Jenkins 80'; Brian Walsh 28'			Stadium: Ninian Park; Attendance: 15,689; Referee: Jack Taylor (Wolverhampton)

15 November 1958 16	Fulham	2–1	Cardiff City	London
14:15	Maurice Cook 32'; Tosh Chamberlain 73'		21' Brian Walsh	Stadium: Craven Cottage; Attendance: 24,078; Referee: TN Cooper (Lancashire)

22 November 1958 17	Cardiff City	2–2	Sheffield Wednesday	Cardiff
14:45	Brian Jenkins 53'; Derek Tapscott 58'		15' Redfern Froggatt; 23' Roy Shiner	Stadium: Ninian Park; Attendance: 20,195; Referee: DT Blues

6 December 1958 18	Cardiff City	2–1	Leyton Orient	Cardiff
14:30	Ron Hewitt 17', 71' (pen.)		52' Eddie Lewis	Stadium: Ninian Park; Attendance: 15,184; Referee: Gilbert Pullin (Bristol)

13 December 1958 19	Sunderland	0–2	Cardiff City	Sunderland
15:00			27' Derek Tapscott; 53' Joe Bonson	Stadium: Roker Park; Attendance: 30,097; Referee: Ernest Crawford (Doncaster)

18 December 1958 20	Scunthorpe United	1–0	Cardiff City	Scunthorpe
18:45	Jack Marriott 62'			Stadium: Old Show Ground; Attendance: 10,365; Referee: Les Hamer (Horwich)

20 December 1958 21	Barnsley	3–2	Cardiff City	Barnsley
	Lol Chappell 14', 58'; Malcolm Graham 87'		26' Ron Hewitt; 35' Brian Walsh	Stadium: Oakwell; Attendance: 7,798; Referee: WE Bradbury (Burton on Trent)

26 December 1958 22	Bristol City	2–3	Cardiff City	Bristol
15:00	Bobby Etheridge 28'; John Atyeo 49'		67', 71' Joe Bonson; 32' Brian Walsh	Stadium: Ashton Gate; Attendance: 27,570; Referee: Eric (ET) Jennings (Worcestershire)

27 December 1958 23	Cardiff City	1–0	Bristol City	Cardiff
14:30	Tommy Burden 3' (o.g.)			Stadium: Ninian Park; Attendance: 27,146; Referee: RH Chandler (Chester)

3 January 1959 24	Cardiff City	1–0	Rotherham United	Cardiff
14:30	Brayley Reynolds			Stadium: Ninian Park; Attendance: 17,115; Referee: Hugh Gerrard (Preston)

31 January 1959 25	Cardiff City	3–1	Brighton & Hove Albion	Cardiff
14:45	Brian Jenkins 33'; Joe Bonson 39'; Derek Tapscott 86'		40' Dave Sexton	Stadium: Ninian Park; Attendance: 15,891; Referee: W Hickson (Wigan)

7 February 1959 26	Grimsby Town	5–1	Cardiff City	Grimsby
15:15	Johnny Scott 9' (pen.); Jimmy Fell 17'; Ron Cockerill 46'; Ron Rafferty 50', 78'		81' Brayley Reynolds	Stadium: Blundell Park; Attendance: 9,969; Referee: NN Hough (Macclesfield)

14 February 1959 27	Cardiff City	3–0	Liverpool	Cardiff
15:15	Derek Tapscott 28', 60'; Brayley Reynolds 88'	Liverpool report		Stadium: Ninian Park; Attendance: 18,313; Referee: Roger Woan (London)

21 February 1959 28	Middlesbrough	1–1	Cardiff City	Middlesbrough
	Alan Peacock 32'		35' Brian Walsh	Stadium: Ayresome Park; Attendance: 12,986; Referee: H Webb (Yorkshire)

28 February 1959 29	Lincoln City	4–2	Cardiff City	Lincoln
15:00	Andy Graver 18'; John McClelland 22'; Brian Wright 32'; Fred Middleton 60'		47' Brayley Reynolds; 61' Brian Jenkins	Stadium: Sincil Bank; Attendance: 8,736; Referee: Ron Warnke (Coventry)

7 March 1959 30	Cardiff City	0–1	Swansea Town	Cardiff
15:15			60' (pen.) Mel Nurse	Stadium: Ninian Park; Attendance: 24,450; Referee: Alf Bond (Fulham)

14 March 1959 31	Stoke City	0–1	Cardiff City	Stoke
			Ron Hewitt	Stadium: Victoria Ground; Attendance: 11,931; Referee: T Jepson (Mansfield)

21 March 1959 32	Cardiff City	0–0	Derby County	Cardiff
15:15				Stadium: Ninian Park; Attendance: 14,011

28 March 1959 33	Ipswich Town	3–3	Cardiff City	Ipswich
15:00	Ted Phillips 52', 70'; Ray Crawford 56'		47' Derek Tapscott; 77' (pen.) Ron Hewitt; 88' Colin Hudson	Stadium: Portman Road; Attendance: 12,159; Referee: Ken Aston (Ilford)

30 March 1959 34	Charlton Athletic	0–0	Cardiff City	London
				Stadium: The Valley; Attendance: 16,344

31 March 1959 35	Cardiff City	1–2	Charlton Athletic	Cardiff
15:15	Derrick Sullivan 65'		5', 35' Johnny Summers	Stadium: Ninian Park; Attendance: 16,045; Referee: Peter Brandwood (Kidderminster)

4 April 1959 36	Cardiff City	1–2	Fulham	Cardiff
15:15	Brian Walsh 1'		73' Graham Leggat; 83' Johnny Haynes	Stadium: Ninian Park; Attendance: 23,217; Referee: ER Hill (Chester)

11 April 1959 37	Sheffield Wednesday	3–1	Cardiff City	Sheffield
15:00	Roy Shiner 56', 89'; John Fantham 66'		1' Derek Tapscott	Stadium: Hillsborough; Attendance: 22,665; Referee: PJ Smyth (London)

15 April 1959 38	Swansea Town	1–3	Cardiff City	Swansea
17:15	Colin Webster		George Kelly; George Kelly (o.g.) Mel Nurse	Stadium: Vetch Field; Attendance: 14,893; Referee: HJ Husband (London)

18 April 1959 39	Cardiff City	0–2	Scunthorpe United	Cardiff
15:15			19' Jack Haigh; 69' Ronnie Waldock	Stadium: Ninian Park; Attendance: 13,009; Referee: Eric Jennings (Stourbridge)

22 April 1959 40	Cardiff City	2–1	Sunderland	Cardiff
18:30	Ron Hewitt 19'; Brian Walsh 58'		79' John Goodchild	Stadium: Ninian Park; Attendance: 10,374; Referee: Bill Clements (West Bromwich)

25 April 1959 41	Leyton Orient	3–0	Cardiff City	London
15:15	Eddy Brown 20'; Tommy Johnston 55', 57'			Stadium: Brisbane Road; Attendance: 11,351; Referee: George McCabe (Sheffield)

27 April 1959 42	Sheffield United	1–1	Cardiff City	Sheffield
18:30	Harry Orr		Derek Tapscott	Stadium: Bramall Lane; Attendance: 12,733; Referee: WE Bradbury (Burton on Trent)

=== FA Cup ===
10 January 1959 Round 3	Plymouth Argyle	0–3	Cardiff City	Plymouth
14:15			(pen.) Ron Hewitt; Brayley Reynolds; Joe Bonson	Stadium: Home Park; Attendance: 36,247; Referee: Alf Bond (Fulham)

24 January 1959 Round 4	Norwich City	3–2	Cardiff City	Norwich
14:45	Errol Crossan; Terry Bly; Terry Bly		Ron Hewitt; Joe Bonson	Stadium: Carrow Road; Attendance: 38,000; Referee: John Kelly (Chorley, Lancashire)

=== Welsh Cup ===
5 February 1959 Round 5	Gloucester City	1–1	Cardiff City	Gloucester
	Goal		(pen.) Ron Hewitt	Stadium: Longlevens; Attendance: 5,000

11 February 1959 Round 5 (Replay)	Cardiff City	3–0	Gloucester City	Cardiff
14:45	Alec Milne; Joe Bonson; Colin Hudson			Stadium: Ninian Park; Attendance: 5,000; Referee: Harold Williams (Sheffield)

25 February 1959 Round 6	Cardiff City	3–1	Rhyl	Cardiff
15:30	Derek Tapscott; Brayley Reynolds; Harry Knowles		Goal	Stadium: Ninian Park; Attendance: 4,000

19 March 1959 Semi Final	Wrexham	0–6	Cardiff City	Shrewsbury
16:15		Wrexham report	8', 25', 60' Harry Knowles; 40', 73' Derek Tapscott; 30' Ron Hewitt	Stadium: Gay Meadow; Attendance: 3,621

30 April 1959 Final	Lovell's Athletic	0–2	Cardiff City	Newport
18:30			Colin Hudson; Joe Bonson	Stadium: Somerton Park; Attendance: 8,000; Referee: Leo Callaghan (Merthyr Tydfil)

== See also ==
- List of Cardiff City F.C. seasons
