= 1960–61 Cardiff City F.C. season =

Welsh football club season

Cardiff City
1960–61 season
- Manager: Bill Jones
- Football League First Division: 15th
- FA Cup: 3rd round
- League Cup: 2nd round
- Welsh Cup: Semi-finals
- Top goalscorer: League: Derek Tapscott (21); All: Derek Tapscott (30)
- Highest home attendance: 45,463 v Tottenham Hotspur, 11 March 1961
- Lowest home attendance: 9,549 v West Ham United, 22 April 1961
- Average home league attendance: 23,390
Home colours

The 1960–61 season was Cardiff City F.C.'s 34th season in the Football League. They competed in the 22-team Division One, then the first tier of English football, finishing fifteenth.

== Players ==
Note: Flags indicate national team as defined under FIFA eligibility rules; some limited exceptions apply. Players may hold more than one non-FIFA nationality.

Pos.	Nation	Player
GK	ENG	Ron Nicholls
GK	EIR	Maurice Swan
GK	WAL	Graham Vearncombe
DF	WAL	Colin Baker
DF	WAL	Trevor Edwards
DF	SCO	Danny Malloy
DF	SCO	Alec Milne
DF	WAL	Frank Rankmore
DF	WAL	Ron Stitfall
DF	WAL	Derrick Sullivan
MF	WAL	Alan Durban
MF	WAL	Steve Gammon
MF	WAL	Alan Harrington
MF	WAL	Barrie Hole
MF	WAL	Mike Hughes

Pos.	Nation	Player
MF	WAL	Brian Jenkins
MF	ENG	Peter King
MF	WAL	Danny McCarthy
MF	WAL	Graham Moore
MF	SCO	Bob Scott
MF	ENG	Brian Walsh
FW	ENG	Peter Donnelly
FW	ENG	Brian Edgley
FW	ENG	Derek Hogg
FW	ENG	Colin Hudson
FW	SCO	John McMillan
FW	WAL	Tony Pickrell
FW	WAL	Derek Tapscott
FW	WAL	Dai Ward
FW	ENG	Johnny Watkins

== League standings ==
Pos	Team	Pld	W	D	L	GF	GA	GAv	Pts	Qualification or relegation
13	Manchester City	42	13	11	18	79	90	0.878	37	
14	Nottingham Forest	42	14	9	19	62	78	0.795	37	Qualification for the Inter-Cities Fairs Cup first round
15	Cardiff City	42	13	11	18	60	85	0.706	37	
16	West Ham United	42	13	10	19	77	88	0.875	36	
17	Fulham	42	14	8	20	72	95	0.758	36	

Source: World Football
Rules for classification: 1) Points; 2) Goal average; 3) Goals scored

=== Results by round ===
Round	1	2	3	4	5	6	7	8	9	10	11	12	13	14	15	16	17	18	19	20	21	22	23	24	25	26	27	28	29	30	31	32	33	34	35	36	37	38	39	40	41	42
Ground	A	H	H	A	A	H	H	A	A	H	A	A	H	H	A	A	H	A	H	A	H	H	H	A	A	H	A	H	A	H	H	A	H	H	H	A	A	H	A	A	H	A
Result	D	L	W	L	W	D	L	L	L	W	L	D	L	W	L	L	D	D	W	L	W	W	W	D	D	W	L	D	W	W	W	L	W	L	L	L	L	D	L	L	D	D
Position			11	16	11	14	15	15	17	14	17	18	18	17	18	19	18	17	15	17	14	13	13	13	13	9	12	12	11	9	7	9	6	9	10	12	14	13	13	14	14	15
Points	1	1	3	3	5	6	6	6	6	8	8	9	9	11	11	11	12	13	15	15	17	19	21	22	23	25	25	26	28	30	32	32	34	34	34	34	34	35	35	35	36	37

Source: Competitive matches
A = Away; H = Home; W = Win; D = Draw; L = Loss

== Fixtures and results ==
=== First Division ===
20 August 1960 1	Fulham	2–2	Cardiff City	London
15:15	Graham Leggat 47'; Johnny Haynes 85'		5' Brian Walsh; 10' Graham Moore	Stadium: Craven Cottage; Attendance: 30,911; Referee: Frank Cowen (Manchester)

24 August 1960 2	Cardiff City	0–1	Sheffield Wednesday	Cardiff
19:15			50' Alan Finney	Stadium: Ninian Park; Attendance: 31,335

27 August 1960 3	Cardiff City	2–0	Preston North End	Cardiff
15:15	Derek Tapscott 4', 20'			Stadium: Ninian Park; Attendance: 27,213

31 August 1960 4	Sheffield Wednesday	2–0	Cardiff City	Sheffield
19:15	John Quinn 30', 32'			Stadium: Hillsborough; Attendance: 27,537; Referee: Ken Seddon (Southport)

3 September 1960 5	Burnley	1–2	Cardiff City	Burnley
15:00	Jimmy Robson 66'		40' Derek Tapscott; 88' Johnny Watkins	Stadium: Turf Moor; Attendance: 19,695; Referee: William Surtees (Langley Park)

7 September 1960 6	Cardiff City	1–1	Aston Villa	Cardiff
19:15	Derek Tapscott 55'		43' Vic Crowe	Stadium: Ninian Park; Attendance: 34,716; Referee: Jim Finney (Hereford)

10 September 1960 7	Cardiff City	1–3	Nottingham Forest	Cardiff
15:15	Derek Tapscott 19'	Forest report	20' Billy Younger; 39' Geoff Vowden; 70' Billy Gray	Stadium: Ninian Park; Attendance: 24,037; Referee: Arthur Edge (Liverpool)

12 September 1960 8	Aston Villa	2–1	Cardiff City	Birmingham
19:15	Bobby Thomson 33'; Harry Burrows 36'		11' Peter Donnelly	Stadium: Villa Park; Attendance: 32,901; Referee: John Bullough (Bolton)

17 September 1960 9	Manchester City	4–2	Cardiff City	Manchester
15:00	Joe Hayes 4', 82'; Colin Barlow 16', 21'		51' Derek Tapscott; 83' Alan Durban	Stadium: Maine Road; Attendance: 30,932; Referee: Peter Brandwood (Kidderminster)

24 September 1960 10	Cardiff City	1–0	Arsenal	Cardiff
15:15	Derek Tapscott 52'			Stadium: Ninian Park; Attendance: 32,775; Referee: Bill Clements (West Bromwich)

1 October 1960 11	Newcastle United	5–0	Cardiff City	Newcastle
15:00	George Luke 7', 70'; Len White 30', 63'; Bobby Mitchell 87'			Stadium: St James's Park; Attendance: 17,627

8 October 1960 12	Wolverhampton Wanderers	2–2	Cardiff City	Wolverhampton
	Ted Farmer 7', 28'	Wolves Complete History	38' Colin Hudson; 74' Trevor Edwards	Stadium: Molineux; Attendance: 23,800; Referee: Jim Pickles (Stockport)

15 October 1960 13	Cardiff City	0–1	Bolton	Cardiff
15:00			11' Nat Lofthouse	Stadium: Ninian Park; Attendance: 22,672; Referee: Denis Howell (Birmingham)

28 October 1960 14	Cardiff City	2–1	Leicester City	Cardiff
19:00	Peter Donnelly; Derek Hogg		Jimmy Walsh	Stadium: Ninian Park; Attendance: 19,136; Referee: Fred Duxbury (Preston)

2 November 1960 15	Tottenham Hotspur	3–2	Cardiff City	London
19:30	Terry Medwin 35'; Danny Blanchflower 60' (pen.); Terry Dyson		20', 85' Peter Donnelly	Stadium: White Hart Lane; Attendance: 47,605; Referee: Ken Tuck (Derby)

5 November 1960 16	Blackpool	6–1	Cardiff City	Blackpool
15:00	Ray Charnley 7', 22'; Bill Perry 48'; Dave Durie 24'; Ray Parry 54', 75'		6' Derek Tapscott	Stadium: Bloomfield Road; Attendance: 13,457

12 November 1960 17	Cardiff City	1–1	Everton	Cardiff
15:15	Johnny Watkins 14'		2' Billy Bingham	Stadium: Ninian Park; Attendance: 19,234; Referee: Robert Mann (Worcester)

19 November 1960 18	Blackburn Rovers	2–2	Cardiff City	Blackburn
15:00	Peter Dobing 50'; Chris Crowe 53'		10' Derek Tapscott; 46' (o.g.) Andy McEvoy	Stadium: Ewood Park; Attendance: 15,132; Referee: Kevin Howley (Middlesbrough)

26 November 1960 19	Cardiff City	3–0	Manchester United	Cardiff
15:15	Derek Hogg 31', 60'; Brian Edgley 43'			Stadium: Ninian Park; Attendance: 21,122; Referee: Harold Horner (Coventry)

3 December 1960 20	West Ham United	2–0	Cardiff City	London
15:00	Malcolm Musgrove 35'; Dave Dunmore 49'			Stadium: Upton Park; Attendance: 13,967; Referee: Peter Brandwood (Kidderminster)

10 December 1960 21	Cardiff City	2–1	Chelsea	Cardiff
15:15	Brian Walsh 13'; Colin Baker 20'		55' Jimmy Greaves	Stadium: Ninian Park; Attendance: 21,840; Referee: Harold Callaghan (Stockport)

17 December 1960 22	Cardiff City	2–0	Fulham	Cardiff
15:15	Colin Baker 28'; Derek Tapscott 79'			Stadium: Ninian Park; Attendance: 16,807

26 December 1960 23	Cardiff City	3–1	West Bromwich Albion	Cardiff
15:15	Derek Tapscott; Derek Tapscott; Derek Tapscott		Brian Macready	Stadium: Ninian Park; Attendance: 25,214; Referee: Gilbert Pullin (Bristol)

27 December 1960 24	West Bromwich Albion	1–1	Cardiff City	West Bromwich
	Derek Kevan		Colin Baker	Stadium: The Hawthorns; Attendance: 30,131

31 December 1960 25	Preston North End	1–1	Cardiff City	Preston
	Peter Thompson 25'		29' Derek Tapscott	Stadium: Deepdale; Attendance: 11,048

14 January 1961 26	Cardiff City	2–1	Burnley	Cardiff
15:00	Derek Tapscott 9', 35'		2' Ray Pointer	Stadium: Ninian Park; Attendance: 25,670; Referee: Roger Woan (London)

21 January 1961 27	Nottingham Forest	2–1	Cardiff City	Nottingham
15:00	Colin Booth 55'; Johnny Quigley 70'	Forest report	11' Derek Tapscott	Stadium: City Ground; Attendance: 19,227; Referee: John Mitchell (Prescot)

4 February 1961 28	Cardiff City	3–3	Manchester City	Cardiff
15:00	Graham Moore 20'; Derek Tapscott 23'; Colin Baker 37'		21', 50' Joe Hayes; 85' Gerry Baker	Stadium: Ninian Park; Attendance: 15,218; Referee: Jim Finney (Hereford)

11 February 1961 29	Arsenal	2–3	Cardiff City	London
	David Herd 27', 71'		6' Graham Moore; 37' Brian Walsh; 47' Peter Donnelly	Stadium: Highbury; Attendance: 33,534; Referee: Harry New (Hampshire)

22 February 1961 30	Cardiff City	3–2	Newcastle United	Cardiff
19:15	Graham Moore 9', 57'; Brian Walsh 14'		44' Ivor Allchurch; 70' Len White	Stadium: Ninian Park; Attendance: 22,502; Referee: Harold Horner (Coventry)

25 February 1961 31	Cardiff City	3–2	Wolverhampton Wanderers	Cardiff
15:15	Brian Walsh 36'; Peter Donnelly 62'; Derek Tapscott 77'	Wolves Complete History	43', 89' Ted Farmer	Stadium: Ninian Park; Attendance: 24,396; Referee: Ken Aston (Ilford)

4 March 1961 32	Bolton	3–0	Cardiff City	Bolton
	Dennis Stevens 38', 77'; Doug Holden 49'			Stadium: Burnden Park; Attendance: 21,815

11 March 1961 33	Cardiff City	3–2	Tottenham Hotspur	Cardiff
19:00	Derek Hogg 10'; Brian Walsh 49'; Derek Tapscott 50'		3' Terry Dyson; 17' Les Allen	Stadium: Ninian Park; Attendance: 45,463; Referee: Eric Jennings (Stourbridge)

24 March 1961 34	Cardiff City	0–2	Blackpool	Cardiff
19:15			Ray Charnley; Des Horne	Stadium: Ninian Park; Attendance: 19,754; Referee: Jack Taylor (Wolverhampton)

31 March 1961 35	Cardiff City	0–2	Birmingham City	Cardiff
15:15			2' (pen.) Jimmy Harris; 35' Bryan Orritt	Stadium: Ninian Park; Attendance: 16,339; Referee: Arthur Edge (Liverpool)

1 April 1961 36	Chelsea	6–1	Cardiff City	London
15:00	Mike Harrison 2'; Jimmy Greaves 17'; Ron Tindall 65', 70'; Bobby Tambling 43'; Alan Harrington 89' (o.g.)		51' Alan Durban	Stadium: Stamford Bridge; Attendance: 22,697; Referee: Francis Clarke (Coventry)

3 April 1961 37	Birmingham City	2–1	Cardiff City	Birmingham
15:00	Jimmy Harris 60'; Bryan Orritt 86'		90' Graham Moore	Stadium: St Andrew's; Attendance: 20,065; Referee: Norman Hough (Macclesfield)

8 April 1961 38	Cardiff City	1–1	Blackburn Rovers	Cardiff
15:15	Trevor Edwards 18'		85' Fred Pickering	Stadium: Ninian Park; Attendance: 16,192; Referee: Bill Clements (West Bromwich)

10 April 1961 39	Leicester City	3–0	Cardiff City	Leicester
19:30	Jimmy Walsh; Jimmy Walsh; Hugh McIlmoyle			Stadium: Filbert Street; Attendance: 32,042; Referee: Roger Woan (London)

15 April 1961 40	Everton	5–1	Cardiff City	Liverpool
15:15	Bobby Collins 4', 29' (pen.), 49'; Alex Young 44', 46'		83' Dai Ward	Stadium: Goodison Park; Attendance: 34,382; Referee: Charles Rogers (Greenford, Middlesex)

22 April 1961 41	Cardiff City	1–1	West Ham United	Cardiff
15:15	Peter Donnelly 35'		69' John Dick	Stadium: Ninian Park; Attendance: 9,549; Referee: John Mitchell (Prescot, Lancashire)

29 April 1961 42	Manchester United	3–3	Cardiff City	Manchester
15:00	Bobby Charlton 10', 35'; Maurice Setters 31'		29' Derek Tapscott; 53', 74' (pen.) Derek Hogg	Stadium: Old Trafford; Attendance: 30,420; Referee: Robert Mann (Worcester)

=== League Cup ===
3 October 1960 Round 1	Middlesbrough	3–4	Cardiff City	Middlesbrough
	Brian Clough 21', 78'; Alan Peacock 89'		Brian Walsh; Peter Donnelly; Colin Hudson (pen.) Trevor Edwards	Stadium: Ayresome Park; Attendance: 15,695

24 October 1960 Round 2	Cardiff City	0–4	Burnley	Cardiff
19:15			35', 49', 89' Gordon Harris; 78' John Connelly	Stadium: Ninian Park; Attendance: 12,000; Referee: Gilbert Pullin (Bristol)

=== FA Cup ===
7 January 1961 Round 3	Cardiff City	1–1	Manchester City	Cardiff
15:00	Derek Tapscott 40'		36' (o.g.) Alan Harrington	Stadium: Ninian Park; Attendance: 25,640; Referee: Denis Howell (Birmingham)

11 January 1961 Round 3 (Replay)	Manchester City	0–0 (a.e.t.)	Cardiff City	Manchester
19:30				Stadium: Maine Road; Attendance: 40,000; Referee: Ernie Crawford (Doncaster)

16 January 1961 Round 3 (Second Replay)	Manchester City	2–0 (a.e.t.)	Cardiff City	London
19:30	Denis Law 91'; Joe Hayes 119'			Stadium: Highbury; Attendance: 24,168; Referee: Ernie Crawford (Doncaster)

=== Welsh Cup ===
28 January 1961 Round 5	Cardiff City	16–0	Knighton Town	Cardiff
	Derek Tapscott 21', 43', 44', 55', 57' (??); Graham Moore 15', 36', 42' (??); Brian Walsh (??), 88'; Peter Donnelly 41' (??); Derek Hogg 82'; Danny Malloy			Stadium: Ninian Park; Attendance: 1,800; Referee: J Meredith (Shrewsbury)

16 February 1961 Round 6	Cardiff City	2–1	Newport County	Cardiff
19:15	Derek Hogg (pen.); Graham Moore		Barrie Meyer	Stadium: Ninian Park; Attendance: 12,192; Referee: D King (Ynysybwl)

22 March 1961 Semi Final	Swansea Town	1–1	Cardiff City	Newport
19:15	Brayley Reynolds		Derek Tapscott	Stadium: Somerton Park; Attendance: 10,470; Referee: CW Kingston (Newport)

28 March 1961 Semi Final (Replay)	Swansea Town	2–1	Cardiff City	Llanelli
17:45	Brayley Reynolds (?)		Derek Tapscott	Stadium: Stebonheath Park; Attendance: 20,000; Referee: CW Kingston (Newport)

== See also ==
- Cardiff City F.C. seasons
