= Cardiff City F.C. in European football =

List of Cardiff City F.C. Europe matches

These are Cardiff City Football Club matches in Europe. Cardiff have only entered one European Competition as of 2021, which is the European Cup Winners' Cup. Their first European match was in 1964 against Esbjerg fB which they drew 0-0 at the Blue Water Arena in Esbjerg. The farthest that Cardiff advanced to was the 1967-68 semi-finals. As of 2008 Cardiff have had multiple games in friendly games held in Portugal as part of a pre-season friendly tour, which are also included in the list along with home game friendlies against foreign clubs.

Earlier tours included ones in 1924 when Cardiff played Sparta Prague (twice), Borussia, SV Hamburg and First Vienna and 1928 saw a tour to Denmark where Aarhus, Aalborg and Odense Comb were the opponents. Games were played in Ireland against an Ulster XI and Derry City in May 1950. In 1961 a tour to Ireland saw games against Shamrock Rovers and Waterford, whilst in 1964 Juventus, AS Roma and Latina were the opponents in Italy. In 1968 Cardiff toured Australia and New Zealand playing 14 matches over 6 weeks. 1969 saw a tour to Mauritius and Zambia playing three times against each country. Later tours have included a pre-season tour to Denmark in August 1979 and one to Scotland in 1980.

Home friendlies have included defeats against Moscow Dynamo in 1945 by 10-1, ADO The Hague in 1970, and wins over Lugano in September 1959, Kickers Offenbach in 1962, FC Schalke 04 in 1971 with the game against SV Werder Bremen in 1969 being a draw. The 1960-61 season saw home friendly wins over Grasshoppers Zurich, which was also the Ninian Park Floodlight Opening game on 5 October, and FC Biel, and a loss to VfL Osnabruck.

== Competitive Matches ==
Win Draw Loss Upcoming fixture

Season	Competition	Round	Opposition	Results		
Season	Competition	Round	Opposition	1st Leg	2nd Leg	Aggregate
1964-65	Cup Winners' Cup	First Round	(Denmark) Esbjerg fB	0-0 (A)	1-0 (H)	1-0
1964-65	Cup Winners' Cup	Second Round	Sporting Clube de Portugal	2-1 (A)	0-0 (H)	2-1
1964-65	Cup Winners' Cup	Quarter-Finals	(Spain) Real Zaragoza	2-2 (A)	0-1 (H)	2-3
1965-66	Cup Winners' Cup	First Round	(Belgium) Standard Liège	1-2 (H)	0-1 (A)	1-3
1967-68	Cup Winners' Cup	First Round	(Republic of Ireland) Shamrock Rovers	1-1 (A)	2-0 (H)	3-1
1967-68	Cup Winners' Cup	Second Round	(Netherlands) NAC Breda	1-1 (A)	4-1 (H)	5-2
1967-68	Cup Winners' Cup	Quarter-Finals	(Soviet Union) FC Torpedo Moscow	1-0 (H)	0-1 (A)	1-1^1
1967-68	Cup Winners' Cup	Semi-Finals	(Germany) Hamburger SV	1-1 (A)	2-3 (H)	3-4
1968-69	Cup Winners' Cup	First Round	(Portugal) FC Porto	2-2 (H)	1-2 (A)	3-4
1969-70	Cup Winners' Cup	First Round	(Norway) Mjøndalen IF	7-1 (A)	5-1 (H)	12-2
1969-70	Cup Winners' Cup	Second Round	(Turkey) Göztepe	0-3 (A)	1-0 (H)	1-3
1970-71	Cup Winners' Cup	First Round	(Cyprus) Pezoporikos Larnaca	8-0 (H)	0-0 (A)	8-0
1970-71	Cup Winners' Cup	Second Round	(France) FC Nantes Atlantique	5-1 (H)	2-1 (A)	7-1
1970-71	Cup Winners' Cup	Quarter-Finals	(Spain) Real Madrid	1-0 (H)	0-2 (A)	1-2
1971-72	Cup Winners' Cup	First Round	(East Germany) Dynamo Berlin	1-1 (A)	1-1 (H)	2-2^2
1973-74	Cup Winners' Cup	First Round	Sporting Clube de Portugal	0-0 (H)	1-2 (A)	1-2
1974-75	Cup Winners' Cup	First Round	(Hungary) Ferencvárosi TC	0-2 (A)	1-4 (H)	1-6
1976-77	Cup Winners' Cup	Qualifying Round	(Switzerland) Servette FC	1-0 (H)	1-2 (A)	2-2 ^3
1976-77	Cup Winners' Cup	First Round	(Soviet Union) FC Dinamo Tbilisi	1-0 (H)	0-3 (A)	1-3
1977-78	Cup Winners' Cup	First Round	Austria Memphis	0-0 (H)	0-1 (A)	0-1
1988-89	Cup Winners' Cup	First Round	(Republic of Ireland) Derry City	0-0 (A)	4-0 (H)	4-0
1988-89	Cup Winners' Cup	Second Round	(Denmark) AGF Aarhus	1-2 (A)	0-4 (H)	1-6
1992-93	Cup Winners' Cup	First Round	(Austria) VfB Admira Wacker Mödling	1-1 (H)	0-2 (A)	1-3
1993-94	Cup Winners' Cup	First Round	(Belgium) Standard Liège	2-5 (A)	1-3 (H)	3-8

== Friendlies ==
Win Draw Loss Upcoming fixture

Season	Competition	Round	Opposition	Results		
Season	Competition	Round	Opposition	1st Leg	2nd Leg	Aggregate
1923-24	Friendly		(Czechoslovakia) Sparta Prague	2-3 (Away)		
1923-24	Friendly		(Czechoslovakia) Sparta Prague	3-2 (Away)		
1923-24	Friendly		(Austria) First Vienna	2-0 (Away)		
1923-24	Friendly		(Germany) Borussia	2-0 (Away)		
1923-24	Friendly		(Germany) Hamburger SV	2-2 (Away)		
1927-28	Friendly		(Denmark) Aarhus	2-0 (Away)		
1927-28	Friendly		(Denmark) AaB	4-0 (Away)		
1927-28	Friendly		(Denmark) Odense Comb	4-1 (Away)		
1937-38	Friendly		(France) Racing Club de Lens	3-1 (Away)		
1945-46	Friendly		(Soviet Union) Moscow Dynamo	1-10 (Ninian Park)		
1949-50	Friendly		(Northern Ireland) Ulster X1	3-0 (Away)		
1949-50	Friendly		(Northern Ireland) Derry City	2-0 (Away)		
1950-51	Friendly	Festival Of Britain Match	(Netherlands) Eindhoven	2-2 (Ninian Park)		
1958-59	Friendly		(Denmark) Esbjerg fB	4-0 (Away)		
1959-60	Friendly		(Switzerland) Lugano	1-0 (Ninian Park)		
1960-61	Friendly	Ninian Park Floodlight Opening	(Switzerland) Grasshoppers Zurich	2-2 (Ninian Park)		
1960-61	Friendly		(Switzerland) FC Biel-Bienne	3-0 (Ninian Park)		
1960-61	Friendly		(West Germany) VfL Osnabruck	1-2 (Ninian Park)		
1960-61	Friendly		(Republic of Ireland) Shamrock Rovers	2-2 (Away)		
1960-61	Friendly		(Republic of Ireland) Waterford	5-1 (Away)		
1961-62	Friendly	Anglo French Friendship Cup	(France) Racing Club Lensois	4-2 (Away)		
1961-62	Friendly		(West Germany) Kickers Offenbach	2-0 (Ninian Park)		
1961-62	Friendly	Anglo French Friendship Cup	(France) Racing Club Lensois	2-0 (Ninian Park)		
1963-64	Friendly		(Italy) Juventus	3-3 (Away)		
1963-64	Friendly		(Italy) Roma	1-4 (Away)		
1963-64	Friendly		(Italy) Latina	3-4 (Away)		
1965-66	Friendly		(France) Toulon	3-3 (Away)		
1969-70	Friendly		(West Germany) SV Werder Bremen	2-2 (Ninian Park)		
1970-71	Friendly		(Netherlands) ADO Den Haag	2-3 (Ninian Park)		
1973-74	Friendly		(West Germany) FC Schalke 04	5-3 (Ninian Park)		
1979-80	Friendly		(Denmark) Fredrickshaven	2-0 (Away)		
1979-80	Friendly		(Denmark) Brovst	4-0 (Away)		
1979-80	Friendly		(Denmark) Thisted	1-1 (Away)		
1979-80	Friendly		(Denmark) Norresundby	5-0 (Away)		
1979-80	Friendly		(Sweden) Gothenburg	3-2 (Ninian Park)		
2007-08	Friendly		(Portugal) Vitoria de Setubal	1-0 (Estádio do Bonfim)		
2007-08	Friendly		(Netherlands) FC Twente	1-0 (Ninian Park)		
2008-09	Friendly		(Portugal) Vitoria de Setubal	1-1 (Estádio do Bonfim)		
2008-09	Algarve Cup	Semi-Final	(Portugal) Vitória de Guimarães	2-1 (Estádio D. Afonso Henriques)		
2008-09	Algarve Cup	Final	(Scotland) Celtic	1-0 (N)		
2008-09	VansDirect Trophy	Final	(Netherlands) Ajax	0-0 (N)		
2009-10	Friendly		(Portugal) Fátima	1-0 (Estádio Municipal de Fátima)		
2009-10	Friendly		(Spain) Valencia	0-2 (Cardiff City Stadium)		
2010-11	Friendly		(Portugal) Portimonense	0-3		
2010-11	Friendly		(Spain) Deportivo La Coruña	0-1 (Cardiff City Stadium)		
2013-14	Friendly		(Italy) Chievo	1-0 (Cardiff City Stadium)		
2013-14	Friendly		(Spain) Athletic Bilbao	2-1 (Cardiff City Stadium)		
2014-15	Friendly		(Germany) 1860 München	3-2 (Kirchbichl, Austria)		
2014-15	Friendly		(Albania) Teuta Durrës	3-0 (Kirchbichl, Austria)		
2014-15	Friendly		(Russia) Amkar Perm	0-3 (Kössen, Austria)		
2014-15	Friendly		(Germany) VfL Wolfsburg	3-3 (Cardiff City Stadium)		
2015-16	Friendly		(Israel) Ironi Kiryat Shmona	2-0 (Putten, Netherlands)		
2015-16	Friendly		(Netherlands) Sparta Rotterdam	1-0 (Behind Closed Doors, Netherlands)		
2016-17	Friendly		(Germany) Rot Weiss Ahlen	(Abandoned) (Ahlen, North Rhine-Westphalia)		
2016-17	Friendly		(Germany) FC St. Pauli	2-1 (Osnabrück, Lower Saxony)		
2016-17	Friendly		(Germany) VfL Osnabrück	3-0 (Osnabrück, Lower Saxony)		
2016-17	Friendly		(Germany) VfL Bochum	1-1 (Herne, North Rhine-Westphalia)		

== Finals ==
Year	Competition	Opposing Team	Score	Venue
2008	Algarve Cup	(Scotland) Celtic	1-0	(Portugal) Estádio Algarve, Algarve
2008	VansDirect Trophy	(Netherlands) Ajax	0-0 (Shared)	

=== Semi-finals ===
Year	Competition	Opposing Team	Score	Where the Final was	Other Semi-finalists
1968	Cup Winners' Cup	(Germany) Hamburger SV	3–4 on aggregate	Two Legged Games	(Italy) AC Milan (Germany) Bayern Munich

== Overall Record ==
=== By competition ===
Competition	Pld	W	D	L	GF	GA	GD
Cup Winners' Cup	49	16	14	19	67	61	6
Friendlies	44	26	9	9	106	71	35
Algarve Cup	2	2	0	0	3	1	2
VansDirect Trophy	1	0	1	0	0	0	0
Total	96	44	24	28	176	133	43

=== By Country ===
Country	Pld	W	D	L	GF	GA	GD	Win%
Austria	4	0	2	2	1	4	−3	0.00
Belgium	4	0	0	4	4	11	−7	0.00
Cyprus	2	1	1	0	8	0	+8	50.00
Denmark	4	1	1	2	2	6	−4	25.00
East Germany	2	0	2	0	2	2	+0	0.00
France	2	2	0	0	7	1	+6	100.00
Germany	2	0	1	1	3	4	−1	0.00
Hungary	2	0	0	2	1	6	−5	0.00
Ireland	4	2	2	0	7	1	+6	50.00
Italy	1	1	0	0	1	0	+1	100.00
Netherlands	4	2	2	0	6	2	+4	50.00
Norway	2	2	0	0	12	2	+10	100.00
Portugal	11	4	4	3	11	12	−1	36.36
Scotland	1	1	0	0	1	0	+1	100.00
Soviet Union	5	3	0	2	3	4	−1	60.00
Spain	6	1	1	4	3	8	−5	16.67
Switzerland	2	1	0	1	2	2	+0	50.00
Turkey	2	1	0	1	1	3	−2	50.00

== Notes and references ==
^1 Cardiff won 1-0 in the play-off round against FC Torpedo Moscow.
^2 Cardiff lost on in a Penalty Shootout against Dynamo Berlin.
^3 Cardiff beat Servette FC on away goals.
