= Peter McCall =

Peter McCall may refer to:

- Peter McCall (footballer) (1936–2020), English footballer
- Peter McCall (mayor) (1809–1880), American lawyer, politician and mayor of Philadelphia, 1844–1845
- Peter McCall (police commissioner), British politician and Cumbria Police and Crime Commissioner
