= 1956–57 Newport County A.F.C. season =

Welsh association football club season

Newport County
1956–57 season
- Manager: Billy Lucas
- Stadium: Somerton Park
- Third Division South: 12th
- FA Cup: 4th round
- Welsh Cup: Semi-final
- Top goalscorer: League: Harris/Hudson/Terry (15); All: Harris (20)
- Highest home attendance: 22,450 vs Arsenal (26 January 1957)
- Lowest home attendance: 4,578 vs Aldershot (2 May 1957)
- Average home league attendance: 9,239
Home colours	Away colours

The 1956–57 season was Newport County's 29th season in the Football League and 10th consecutive season in the Third Division South since relegation from the Second Division at the end of the 1946–47 season.

== Season review ==
=== Results summary ===
Overall								Home						Away					
Pld	W	D	L	GF	GA	GAv	Pts	W	D	L	GF	GA	Pts	W	D	L	GF	GA	Pts
46	16	13	17	65	62	1.048	45	15	6	2	51	18	36	1	7	15	14	44	9

Source: rsssf.com

=== Results by round ===
Round	1	2	3	4	5	6	7	8	9	10	11	12	13	14	15	16	17	18	19	20	21	22	23	24	25	26	27	28	29	30	31	32	33	34	35	36	37	38	39	40	41	42	43	44	45	46
Ground	H	A	A	H	H	A	A	H	H	A	H	H	A	A	H	A	H	A	H	H	A	A	H	H	A	A	H	H	A	H	A	H	H	A	H	H	A	A	A	H	H	A	A	A	H	A
Result	W	D	D	W	W	L	D	D	W	L	W	D	D	D	W	L	W	L	D	W	D	W	D	L	L	L	W	D	L	W	L	D	W	L	W	L	L	L	L	W	W	L	L	D	W	L
Position	1	6	7	4	4	5	7	4	2	7	2	2	4	4	4	4	3	5	4	4	3	2	3	8	10	13	12	12	13	12	13	14	12	14	13	13	14	14	14	13	9	13	15	15	12	12

Updated to match(es) played on 4 May 1957. Source: statto.com
A = Away; H = Home; W = Win; D = Draw; L = Loss

== Fixtures and results ==
=== Third Division South ===
Date	Opponents	Venue	Result	Scorers	Attendance
18 Aug 1956	Northampton Town	H	3–0	Terry 2, Harris	11,371
22 Aug 1956	Southend United	A	3–3	Brown 2, Terry	10,934
25 Aug 1956	Queens Park Rangers	A	1–1	Harris	7,844
30 Aug 1956	Southend United	H	2–1	Hudson, Brown	12,224
1 Sep 1956	Plymouth Argyle	H	4–1	Harris, Hudson, Terry	12,089
5 Sep 1956	Exeter City	A	0–2		5,174
8 Sep 1956	Reading	A	0–0		11,598
13 Sep 1956	Exeter City	H	1–1	Terry	10,592
15 Sep 1956	Watford	H	3–0	Terry, Burgess, Beech	11,547
19 Sep 1956	Crystal Palace	A	1–2	Terry	14,132
22 Sep 1956	Colchester United	H	1–0	Sheppeard	12,426
27 Sep 1956	Crystal Palace	H	2–2	Sherwood, Beech	8,008
29 Sep 1956	Norwich City	A	1–1	Terry	16,920
6 Oct 1956	Walsall	A	0–0		10,894
13 Oct 1956	Ipswich Town	H	1–0	Terry	12,673
20 Oct 1956	Bournemouth & Boscombe Athletic	A	1–2	Reynolds	10,337
27 Oct 1956	Torquay United	H	3–0	Harris 2, Terry	12,008
3 Nov 1956	Millwall	A	0–1		13,127
10 Nov 1956	Brighton & Hove Albion	H	0–0		9,082
24 Nov 1956	Swindon Town	H	2–1	Harris 2	9,570
1 Dec 1956	Brentford	A	0–0		11,120
15 Dec 1956	Northampton Town	A	3–0	Hudson, Harris, Brown	6,289
22 Dec 1956	Queens Park Rangers	H	1–1	Sherwood	7,638
12 Jan 1957	Reading	H	1–2	Hollyman	13,840
19 Jan 1957	Watford	A	0–5		7,683
2 Feb 1957	Colchester United	A	0–1		9,705
9 Feb 1957	Norwich City	H	3–1	Hudson, Harris, Burgess	7,088
16 Feb 1957	Walsall	H	2–2	Sherwood, Sheppeard	9,115
23 Feb 1957	Ipswich Town	A	0–5		13,346
7 Mar 1957	Bournemouth & Boscombe Athletic	H	5–3	Hudson 4, Lucas	8,047
9 Mar 1957	Aldershot	A	1–3	Hudson	5,123
16 Mar 1957	Millwall	H	0–0		7,002
21 Mar 1957	Coventry City	H	3–0	Hudson, Terry, Harris	6,332
23 Mar 1957	Brighton & Hove Albion	A	0–2		12,503
30 Mar 1957	Gillingham	H	4–0	Hudson 2, Sheppeard, Harris	7,017
4 Apr 1957	Southampton	H	2–3	Docherty, Harris	6,982
6 Apr 1957	Swindon Town	A	0–1		7,889
8 Apr 1957	Coventry City	A	0–2		5,569
10 Apr 1957	Plymouth Argyle	A	2–3	Hudson, Sheppeard	10,148
13 Apr 1957	Brentford	H	3–0	Terry 2, Hudson	5,497
19 Apr 1957	Shrewsbury Town	H	2–0	Terry, Harris	7,783
20 Apr 1957	Torquay United	A	0–4		8,727
22 Apr 1957	Shrewsbury Town	A	0–2		7,580
27 Apr 1957	Gillingham	A	1–1	Burgess	4,237
2 May 1957	Aldershot	H	3–0	Hudson, Terry, Harris	4,578
4 May 1957	Southampton	A	0–3		5,721

=== FA Cup ===
Round	Date	Opponents	Venue	Result	Scorers	Attendance
1	17 Nov 1956	Walsall	A	1–0	Terry	12,085
2	8 Dec 1956	Gillingham	A	2–1	Terry, Brown	8,700
3	5 Jan 1957	Southampton	H	3–3	Harris 2, Hudson	18,562
3r	9 Jan 1957	Southampton	A	1–0	Harris	22,372
4	26 Jan 1957	Arsenal	H	0–2		22,450

=== Welsh Cup ===
Round	Date	Opponents	Venue	Result	Scorers	Attendance	Notes
5	12 Feb 1957	Merthyr Tydfil	H	3–1	Burgess 2, Harris	1,579	
6	21 Feb 1957	55th TR Royal Artillery	H	3–1	Hudson, Terry, Harris	—	
SF	28 Mar 1957	Swansea Town	N	1–1	Lucas	12,500	At Ninian Park
SFr	1 Apr 1957	Swansea Town	N	0–3		7,000	At Ninian Park

== League table ==
Pos	Team	Pld	W	D	L	GF	GA	GAv	Pts
10	Queens Park Rangers	46	18	11	17	61	60	1.017	47
11	Watford	46	18	10	18	72	75	0.960	46
12	Newport County	46	16	13	17	65	62	1.048	45
13	Reading	46	18	9	19	80	81	0.988	45
14	Northampton Town	46	18	9	19	66	73	0.904	45
