= Peter Donnelly (footballer, born 1936) =

English footballer and manager

Personal information
- Full name: Peter Donnelly
- Date of birth: 22 September 1936 (age 90)
- Place of birth: Hull, England
- Position: Striker

Senior career*
Years	Team	Apps	(Gls)
1953–1958	Doncaster Rovers	6	(1)
1958–1960	Scunthorpe United	39	(13)
1960–1961	Cardiff City	30	(8)
1961–1962	Swansea Town	16	(3)
1962–1964	Brighton & Hove Albion	56	(13)
1964–1966	Bradford City	13	(5)

Managerial career
- 1977: Margate
- 1982–1983: Margate
- * Club domestic league appearances and goals

Peter Donnelly (born 22 September 1936) is an English former professional footballer.

Born in Hull, Donnelly began his career with Doncaster Rovers but was allowed to leave the club in 1958 to join Scunthorpe United. Finding his feet at Scunthorpe, he went on to score 19 times during his time at the club and his form persuaded Cardiff City to offer Joe Bonson to Scunthorpe in exchange. Signing for the club on their return to Division One, he put in a number of strong performances alongside the club's other main strikers, Derek Tapscott and Graham Moore, but was allowed to leave to join rivals Swansea Town.

Spending one year at Swansea, Donnelly went on to finish his career with spells at Brighton & Hove Albion and Bradford City before later serving as manager of Margate in two separate spells.
