= Billy Younger =

English footballer

Personal information
- Full name: William Younger
- Date of birth: 22 March 1940
- Place of birth: Northumberland, England
- Date of death: 2007 (aged 66–67)
- Position: Inside forward

Senior career*
Years	Team	Apps	(Gls)
- Seaton Delaval
1958–1960	Nottingham Forest	12	(2)
1960–1961	Lincoln City	4	(0)
1961–1962	Walsall	8	(5)
1962	Doncaster Rovers	18	(1)
1962–1963	Hartlepools United	37	(4)
–	Ramsgate		
- * Club domestic league appearances and goals

William Younger (born 22 March 1940 – died 2007) was a footballer who played in The Football League for Nottingham Forest, Lincoln City Walsall, Doncaster Rovers and Hartlepools United.
