= Malcolm Tucker (footballer) =

English footballer (1933–2014)

Personal information
- Date of birth: 12 April 1933
- Place of birth: Cramlington, England
- Date of death: 13 January 2014 (aged 80)
- Place of death: South Africa
- Position: Defender

Youth career
- 1949–1953: Newcastle United

Senior career*
Years	Team	Apps	(Gls)
1953–1958	Grimsby Town	30	(0)
	Skegness Town	?	(?)
- * Club domestic league appearances and goals

Malcolm Tucker (12 April 1933 – 13 January 2014) was an English professional footballer who played as a defender. He started his career as an amateur at Newcastle United before going on to play in the Football League for Grimsby Town. He later played non-league football for Skegness Town. Tucker died in South Africa on 13 January 2014, aged 80.
