= Ted Farmer =

English footballer

Personal information
- Full name: James Edward Colm Farmer
- Date of birth: 21 January 1940 (age 86)
- Place of birth: Rowley Regis, England
- Position: Striker

Youth career
- 1949–1953: Wednesbury Commercial
- 1953–1956: Wednesbury Youth Club
- 1956–1960: Wolverhampton Wanderers

Senior career*
Years	Team	Apps	(Gls)
1960–1964	Wolverhampton Wanderers	57	(44)

International career
1961	England U23	2	(5)
- * Club domestic league appearances and goals

James Edward Colm "Ted" Farmer (born 21 January 1940 in Rowley Regis) is an English former footballer. He played four seasons of league football before being forced to retire due to injury aged 24.

== Career ==
Farmer joined Wolves as an amateur in 1956, and after progressing in their reserves, broke into the first team. He scored twice on his senior debut, in a 3–1 win at Manchester United on 24 September 1960.

He ended the season as the club's leading scorer, with 28 goals, as they finished the league in third place. The following season saw him earn a call-up to the England Under-23 side, making a goal scoring debut in a 7–1 win over Israel. He scored a hat trick on his second cap in a 5–2 victory in the Netherlands.

The striker broke his leg shortly afterward though, ending his 1961–62 campaign. Although he returned from his leg break, the next two seasons saw him continually affected by injuries, which ultimately caused him to retire in 1964.

After retiring from playing, Farmer ran a pub in Dudley. He also qualified as a computer programmer and had a very successful career as an analyst/programmer with among other companies The Midlands Electricity Board.

Farmer has the achievement of having scored his 21st goal on his 21st appearance on his 21st birthday on 21 January 1961.
