= David Lambert (footballer) =

Welsh association football player

Personal information
- Full name: David Lambert
- Date of birth: 7 July 1939
- Place of birth: Ruabon, Wales
- Date of death: 2016 (aged 76–77)
- Place of death: Wrexham, Wales
- Position: Left back

Senior career*
Years	Team	Apps	(Gls)
- Druids United
1959–1963	Cardiff City	0	(0)
1963–1964	Wrexham	5	(0)
- Oswestry Town
- * Club domestic league appearances and goals

David Lambert (7 July 1939 – 2016) was a Welsh footballer who played as a left-back. He played in the English football league for Wrexham, and also played for Cardiff City, although made no appearances at the latter.
