= Ron Davies (footballer, born 1932) =

Welsh footballer

Personal information
- Full name: Ronald Thomas Davies
- Date of birth: 21 September 1932
- Place of birth: Merthyr Tydfil, Wales
- Date of death: December 2007 (age 75)
- Height: 5 ft 9 in (1.75 m)
- Position: Full-back

Youth career
- Merthyr Tydfil

Senior career*
Years	Team	Apps	(Gls)
1952–1958	Cardiff City	32	(3)
1958–1964	Southampton	162	(0)
1964–1967	Aldershot	85	(1)
1967–????	Andover		
- * Club domestic league appearances and goals

Ronald Thomas Davies (21 September 1932 – December 2007) was a Welsh professional footballer who played as a full-back for Cardiff City and Southampton in the 1950s and 1960s.

== Playing career ==
Born in Merthyr Tydfil, he started his career as an amateur with Merthyr Tydfil, before signing for Football League First Division team Cardiff City in October 1952. It was until the 1955–56 season that he made his debut for the first team, generally at full back although he was occasionally pressed into service as a forward. In his time with Cardiff he made a total of 32 appearances scoring three goals.

In March 1958, Ted Bates signed him for £7,000 to replace the recently retired Len Wilkins. He soon proved to be a worthy successor and was an ever-present during the Saints' 1959–60 Third Division championship season. According to Holley & Chalk's "The Alphabet of the Saints" he was "unlucky not to gain international recognition during his spell with the club".

He adjusted well to football in the Second Division and missed only one game in 1960–61, but the following season he had to vie for the No.2 shirt with Roy Patrick before losing out altogether to Wales international Stuart Williams in September 1962. For the next two seasons he spent most of his time in the reserves. His final first team outing was on 4 January 1964 in an FA Cup match at The Dell against Manchester United. After a total of 185 appearances for the Saints, without ever scoring, he was transferred to Aldershot in August 1964.

After three seasons at Aldershot he moved to lower league football with Andover. He managed the Winchester Snooker Centre before retiring to Wales in 1997. In his later life he suffered with Alzheimer's disease. His death was reported in December 2007.

== Honours ==
Southampton

- Third Division championship: 1959–60
