= Buck Ryan =

Buck Ryan was a UK newspaper adventure comic strip created by Jack Monk and the writer Don Freeman.

Monk and Freeman were doing an adaptation of Edgar Wallace's Terror Keep for the Daily Mirror. When it was dropped shortly due to a rights problem, Monk and Freeman decided to fashion their own strip, and Buck Ryan was born. It ran in the Daily Mirror from 22 March 1937 to July 1962.

Buck Ryan started again in the Daily Mirror 3 August 2015.

== Characters and story ==
The two-fisted, brown-haired Buck, the strip's protagonist, is a young British private investigator who fights crime. His antagonists include the lady crime boss Twilight along with various kidnappers and German spies.

Twilight later reformed. She and Ryan were shown to be an item in at least one of the later stories and are shown to be about to kiss in some of the strip's panels.

== Story Chronology ==
The Buck Ryan comic strip stories
| № | Title | Writer(s) | Artist(s) | Dates | № of strips | Strip № | Reprinted in |
|---|---|---|---|---|---|---|---|
| 1 | A Lady Disappears | | | 1937-03-22 / 1937-07-21 | 105 | | Confirmed via Comic Book + |
| 2 | The Hooded Terror | | | 1937-07-28 / 1937-10-16 | 70 | | Confirmed via Comic Book + |
| 3 | The Dope Gang | | | 1937-10-18 / 1938-02-12 | 102 | | Confirmed via Comic Book + |
| 4 | Meet Dr Malabar | | | 1938-02-14 / 1938-05-31 | 92 | | Confirmed via Comic Book + |
| 5 | Terror in New Guinea | | | 1938-06-01 / 1938-11-22 | 150 | 001-150 | Confirmed via Comic Book + |
| 6 | Murder at Meadowside House | | | 1938-11-23 / 1939-04-04 | 114 | | Confirmed via Comic Book + |
| 7 | Schultze vows Revenge | | | 1939-04-05 / 1939-07-19 | 91 | | |
| 8 | Smokey Sam's | | | 1939-07-20 / 1939-12-02 | 117 | 001-120 | |
| 9 | The Mystery of the Silent Bomber | | | 1939-12-04 / 1940-05-25 | 150 | | Confirmed via Comic Book + |
| 10 | Buck Ryan in Germany | | | 1940-05-27 / 1940-11-18 | 151 | | |
| 11 | The Mystery of Sydall House | | | 1940-11-19 / 1941-07-30 | 218 | 032-146 | |
| 12 | Smashing the War Racketeers | | | 1941-07-31 / 1941-10-24 | 74 | 147-220 | Confirmed via Comic Book + |
| 13 | Guardians of our Sky | | | 1941-10-25 / 1942-03-2 | 110 | 0221-A052 | |
| 14 | | | | 1942-03-03 / 1942-06-18 | 93 | A053-A144 | |
| 15 | Green Flames | | | 1942-06-19 / 1942-10-20 | 106 | A145-A250 | |
| 16 | Beware - Fifth Columnists! | | | 1942-10-21/ 1943-01-02 | 64 | A251-B002 | |
| 17 | The Fixers | | | 1943-01-04 / 1943-03-09 | 56 | B003-B058 | |
| 18 | | | | 1943-05-17 / 1943-11-27 | 168 | 001-168 | |
| 19 | Hunts Axis Spies | | | 1943-11-29 / 1944-03-24 | 101 | | Confirmed via Comic Book + |
| 20 | Spies in Burma | | | 1944-03-25 / 1944-06-28 | 82 | | Confirmed via Comic Book + |
| 21 | Battles Imperial Forces | | | 1944-06-29 / 1944-10-06 | 86 | 0001-C239 | |
| 22 | Buck Ryan - War Correspondent | | | 1944-10-07 / 1945-01-19 | 90 | C240-D017 | |
| 23 | Buck Ryan and the Terrorists | | | 1945-01-20 / 1945-03-31 | 61 | D018-D077 | |
| 24 | Brides of the Swastika | | | 1945-04-02 / 1945-06-26 | 74 | D078-D149 | |
| 25 | The Case of the Crimson Grass | | | 1945-06-27 / 1945-09-25 | 78 | D150-D227 | |
| 26 | The Case of the Broken Thistle | | | 1945-09-26 / 1946-01-04 | 87 | D228-E041 | |
| 27 | The Atomic Chase | | | 1946-02-18 / 1946-06-29 | 114 | E042-E153 | |
| 28 | The Case of the Blue Star | | | 1946-07-01 / 1946-10-26 | 102 | E154-E255 | |
| 29 | The Sonata Murder Plot | | | 1946-10-28 / 1947-01-25 | 78 | E256-F022 | |
| 30 | Crime With a Collar | | | 1947-01-27 / 1947-05-20 | 98 | F023-F119 | |
| 31 | The Laughing Killer | | | 1947-05-21 / 1947-08-02 | 64 | F120-F183 | |
| 32 | Twilight Escapes | | | 1947-08-04 / 1947-12-11 | 112 | F184-F295 | |
| 33 | Fine Feathers | | | 1947-12-12 / 1948-04-01 | 96 | F296-G078 | |
| 34 | The Riddle of the Stolen Jewels | | | 1948-04-02 / 1948-07-31 | 104 | G079-G182 | |
| 35 | Moon Murder | | | 1948-08-02 / 1948-11-08 | 85 | G183-G267 | |
| 36 | Rule of the Road | | | 1948-11-09 / 1949-02-25 | 94 | G268-H048 | |
| 37 | Avarice | | | 1949-02-26 / 1949-06-13 | 92 | H049-H139 | |
| 38 | Fake Stamps and Crocodiles | | | 1949-06-14 / 1949-09-20 | 85 | H140-H224 | |
| 39 | Twilight's Out | | | 1949-09-21 / 1950-03-21 | 156 | H225-J068 | |
| 40 | The Affairs of Mr Wylie Domeless | | | 1950-03-22 / 1950-07-11 | 96 | J069-J163 | |
| 41 | A Fishy Story | | | 1950-07-12 / 1950-11-07 | 102 | J164-J265 | |
| 42 | The Scrubber | | | 1950-11-08 / 1951-03-01 | 98 | J266-K052 | |
| 43 | The Steel Tree Stump | | | 1951-03-02 / 1951-06-16 | 92 | K053-K143 | |
| 44 | Beating the Book! | | | 1951-06-18 / 1951-09-21 | 83 | K144-K226 | |
| 45 | The Enemy Within | | | 1951-09-22 / 1952-01-05 | 91 | K227-L005 | End Info Confirmed via Mirror |
| 46 | The Fight Game | | | 1952-01-07 / 1952-04-23 | 93 | L006-L096 | All Confirmed via Mirror |
| 47 | Cartoon Violence! | | | 1952-04-24 / 1952-06-25 | 54 | L097-L150 | All Confirmed via Mirror |
| 48 | Twilight Goes to Town | | | 1952-06-26 / 1952-11-12 | 120 | L151-L270 | All Confirmed via Mirror |
| 49 | Fun Fair Fence | | | 1952-11-13 / 1953-03-14 | 105 | L271-M063 | Start Info Confirmed via Mirror |
| 50 | Witchcraft Consultant | | | 1953-03-16 / 1953-05-30 | 66 | M064-M128 | |
| 51 | The Surprise Bag | | | 1953-06-01 / 1953-09-15 | 92 | M129-M220 | |
| 52 | The Nocturnal Fox | | | 1953-09-16 / 1953-12-31 | 92 | M221-M310 | |
| 53 | The Strato Midjet | | | 1954-01-01 / 1954-04-13 | 88 | N001-N088 | |
| 54 | Arty Crafty | | | 1954-04-14 / 1954-08-18 | 109 | N089-N196 | |
| 55 | The Island of Refuge | | | 1954-08-19 / 1954-12-31 | 103 | N197-N310 | All Confirmed via Mirror |
| 56 | The Bank Bandits | | | 1955-01-01 / 1955-05-11 | 90 | O001-O090 | All Confirmed via Mirror |
| 57 | Twilight's Dilemma | | | 1955-05-12 / 1955-08-24 | 90 | O091-O180 | All Confirmed via Swedish chronology |
| 58 | Chocolates, Cigarettes | | | 1955-08-25 / 1955-12-09 | 92 | O181-O272 | All Confirmed via Swedish chronology |
| 59 | The Viking Invasion | | | 1955-12-10 / 1956-03-13 | 99 | O273-P062 | All Confirmed via Swedish chronology |
| 60 | Cyclops, Spirit Guide | | | 1956-03-14 / 1956-06-16 | 81 | P063-P143 | All Confirmed via Swedish chronology |
| 61 | The Four Faced Bandit | | | 1956-06-18 / 1956-11-17 | 132 | P144-P275 | All Confirmed via Swedish chronology |
| 62 | The Show Must Not Go On! | | | 1956-11-19 / 1957-02-12 | 74 | P276-Q37 | All Confirmed via Swedish chronology |
| 63 | The Intruder Seed | | | 1957-02-13 / 1957-06-19 | 109 | Q38-Q145 | All Confirmed via Swedish chronology |
| 64 | The Sport of Kinks | | | 1957-06-20 / 1957-09-14 | 75 | Q146-Q220 | All Confirmed via Swedish chronology |
| 65 | Man-Hunt | | | 1957-09-16 / 1958-01-21 | 110 | Q221-R18 | All Confirmed via Swedish chronology |
| 66 | The Strange Antique Shop | | | 1958-01-22 / 1958-05-10 | 94 | R19-R111 | All Confirmed via Swedish chronology |
| 67 | The Case of the Nervous Hero | | | 1958-05-12 / 1958-09-13 | 108 | R112-R219 | All Confirmed via Swedish chronology |
| 68 | The Mad Mistress of Montezorro | | | 1958-09-15 / 1959-02-28 | 144 | R220-S51 | All Confirmed via Swedish chronology |
| 69 | In The Black | | | 1959-03-02 / 1959-07-18 | 120 | S52-S170 | All Confirmed via Swedish chronology |
| 70 | Road Raiders | | | 1959-07-20 / 1959-10-21 | 81 | S171-S251 | All Confirmed via Mirror and Swedish chronology |
| 71 | Pay Off | | | 1959-10-22 / 1960-01-05 | 65 | S252-T4 | All Confirmed via Mirror and Swedish chronology |
| 72 | Number One | | | 1960-01-06 / 1960-04-23 | 94 | T5-T97 | All Confirmed via Mirror and Swedish chronology |
| 73 | The Rat Pit | | | 1960-04-25 / 1960-08-13 | 96 | T98-T193 | All Confirmed via Mirror and Swedish chronology |
| 74 | Death Watch | | | 1960-08-15 / 1960-12-03 | 96 | T194-T289 | All Confirmed via Mirror and Swedish chronology |
| 75 | Twisted Trail | | | 1960-12-05 / 1961-04-05 | 105 | T290-U80 | All Confirmed via Mirror and Swedish chronology |
| 76 | Jackpot | | | 1961-04-06 / 1961-08-13 | 111 | U81-U191 | All Confirmed via Mirror and Swedish chronology |
| 77 | This Man is Ours | | | 1961-08-14 / 1961-12-09 | 102 | U192-U293 | All Confirmed via Mirror and Swedish chronology |
| 78 | Find the Lady | | | 1961-12-11 / 1962-04-07 | 102 | U294-V84 | All Confirmed via Mirror and Swedish chronology |
| 79 | The Bomber | | | 1962-04-09 / 1962-07-31 | 98 | V85-V181 | All Confirmed via Mirror and Swedish chronology |
