= Derek Hogg =

English footballer

Personal information
- Date of birth: 4 November 1930
- Place of birth: Norton-on-Tees, England
- Date of death: 4 November 2014 (aged 84)
- Position: Outside left

Youth career
- Chorley

Senior career*
Years	Team	Apps	(Gls)
1952–1958	Leicester City	161	(26)
1958–1960	West Bromwich Albion	81	(11)
1960–1962	Cardiff City	41	(7)
1962–1965	Kettering Town	96	(15)
Total		283	(44)

International career
1955	The Football League XI	1	(0)
1956	FA XI	1	(0)
- * Club domestic league appearances and goals

Derek Hogg (4 November 1930 – 4 November 2014) was an English footballer who played at outside-left for Leicester City, West Bromwich Albion and Cardiff City in the 1950s and 1960s.

== Football career ==
Hogg was born Norton-on-Tees in County Durham but started his football career as an amateur with Chorley in the Lancashire Combination.

In October 1952, he was signed as a professional by Leicester City of the Football League Second Division, making his debut in a 3–3 draw with Leeds United on 14 February 1953. He soon developed a partnership with Arthur Rowley who was to become the top goal-scorer in the Football League.

Hogg represented his country twice, playing for an English League XI in 1955 and an English FA XI in 1956.

In 1956–57, Leicester City claimed the Second Division championship with a seven-point margin over local rivals, Nottingham Forest. Hogg played one season in the top-flight with Leicester before being sold to another First Division club, West Bromwich Albion, for £20,000 in April 1958. In total, he played 165 games for Leicester and scored 26 goals.

Hogg spent two seasons with Albion, in which they finished fifth and fourth in the table, before joining newly promoted Cardiff City in October 1960 for £12,500. On 11 March 1961, Hogg scored one of the Cardiff goals in their 3–2 victory over Tottenham Hotspur in front of 45,463 fans at Ninian Park, in the season when Spurs took the League and FA Cup double. Hogg's goal is described in the Cardiff club history as "one of the finest scored on the ground", with a contemporary report saying:

Hogg, who looked more like a solicitor than a footballer, made a mazey run through the Spurs half beating several players. He finished with a rasping shot that had goal written all over it.

Hogg left Cardiff in 1963 and ended his football career at Kettering Town in the Southern League. He died following an illness on 4 November 2014, on his 84th birthday.

== Honours ==
Leicester City

- Football League Second Division champions: 1956–57
