= Terry Farmer =

English footballer

Personal information
- Full name: Terence Farmer
- Date of birth: 11 May 1931
- Place of birth: Maltby, West Riding of Yorkshire, England
- Date of death: 9 May 2014 (aged 82)
- Place of death: Rotherham, South Yorkshire, England
- Position: Striker

Senior career*
Years	Team	Apps	(Gls)
	Gainsborough Trinity	?	(?)
1952–1958	Rotherham United	61	(24)
1958–1960	York City	66	(28)
1960–1961	Scarborough	37	(13)
- * Club domestic league appearances and goals

Terence Farmer (11 May 1931 – 9 May 2014) was an English footballer.

== Career ==
Farmer joined Rotherham United from Gainsborough Trinity in July 1952. After making 61 appearances and scoring 24 goals in the league, he joined York City in January 1958. He featured prominently for the club as they won promotion to the Third Division and scored the goal which won promotion against Aldershot in April 1959. He joined Scarborough in July 1960, after making 67 appearances and scoring 28 goals. He died on 9 May 2014.
