= Brian Sawyer =

English footballer

Personal information
- Date of birth: 28 January 1938 (age 88)
- Place of birth: Rawmarsh, England
- Position: Centre forward

Youth career
- Barnsley

Senior career*
| Years | Team | Apps | (Gls) |
| 1957–1963 | Rotherham United | 91 | (31) |
| 1963–1964 | Bradford City | 15 | (2) |
- Buxton
| Total | | 106 | (33) |
- * Club domestic league appearances and goals

Brian Sawyer (born 28 January 1938) is an English former professional footballer who played as a centre forward.

== Career ==
Born in Rawmarsh, Sawyer played for Barnsley, Rotherham United, Bradford City and Buxton.
