= Doug Newlands =

Scottish footballer (1931–2011)

Personal information
- Full name: Douglas Haigh Newlands
- Date of birth: 29 October 1931
- Place of birth: Edinburgh, Scotland
- Date of death: 11 April 2011 (aged 79)
- Place of death: Perth, Scotland
- Position: Winger

Senior career*
Years	Team	Apps	(Gls)
1951–1954	Aberdeen	3	(0)
1953–1954	→ St Johnstone (loan)	27	(7)
1954–1959	Burnley	98	(21)
1959–1960	Stoke City	32	(8)
1960–1961	St Johnstone	25	(5)
1961–1965	Airdrieonians	76	(18)
1965–1967	Forfar Athletic	22	(12)
Total		261	(71)

Managerial career
- 1966–1967: Forfar Athletic
- * Club domestic league appearances and goals

Douglas Haigh Newlands (29 October 1931 – 11 April 2011) was a Scottish professional footballer who played as a winger.

== Career ==
Newlands was born in Edinburgh and began his career with Aberdeen. He had a productive loan spell with St Johnstone which prompted top-flight English club Burnley to sign Newlands in 1954. He had to bide his time to force himself into the starting eleven at Turf Moor with Billy Gray occupying the number 7. He became a regular in 1956–57 and 1957–58 before the emergence of John Connelly signalled the end of Newlands' time at Burnley. He joined Stoke City and made an instant impact scoring on his debut against Sunderland. It was to be just a one-season stay at Stoke for Newlands and after the end of the 1959–60 season he returned to St Johnstone. He later played for Airdrieonians and Forfar Athletic.

== Career statistics ==
Appearances and goals by club, season and competition
Club	Season	League			FA Cup		Total	
Club	Season	Division	Apps	Goals	Apps	Goals	Apps	Goals
Burnley	1954–55	First Division	1	0	0	0	1	0
Burnley	1955–56	First Division	10	2	0	0	10	2
Burnley	1956–57	First Division	36	6	5	1	41	7
Burnley	1957–58	First Division	41	11	1	1	42	12
Burnley	1958–59	First Division	10	2	0	0	10	2
Burnley	Total		98	21	6	2	104	23
Stoke City	1959–60	Second Division	32	8	2	0	34	8
Career total			130	29	8	2	138	31
