= Joe Bonson =

English footballer

Personal information
- Full name: Joseph Bonson
- Date of birth: 19 June 1936
- Place of birth: Barnsley, England
- Date of death: 29 November 1991 (aged 55)
- Place of death: Wolverhampton, England
- Position: Forward

Youth career
- 1953–1956: Wolverhampton Wanderers

Senior career*
Years	Team	Apps	(Gls)
1956–1957	Wolverhampton Wanderers	10	(3)
1957–1960	Cardiff City	72	(37)
1960–1962	Scunthorpe United	52	(11)
1962	Doncaster Rovers	14	(4)
1962–1964	Newport County	83	(47)
1964–1965	Brentford	35	(13)
1965–1967	Lincoln City	47	(16)
Total		313	(131)
- * Club domestic league appearances and goals

Joseph Bonson (19 June 1936 – 29 November 1991) was an English professional footballer who played for several clubs during the 1950s and 1960s.

== Career ==
Bonson started his career at Wolverhampton Wanderers, working his way through their youth ranks including playing in the 1954 FA Youth Cup Final, losing to Manchester United. He graduated to the first team and made his debut on 1 January 1957 in a 3–2 win at Sunderland, the first of 11 consecutive starts during which he scored 6 goals. However, due to a wealth of striking talent at the club, he was deemed surplus to requirements and sold to Cardiff City for £7,000 at the end of the season.

He joined the Bluebirds as a replacement for Johnny Nicholls, who had left the club to join Exeter City and made a goalscoring debut for the club in a 1–1 draw with Ipswich Town in November 1957. He finished the season with 12 goals in a total of 25 appearances.

During his time at Cardiff he formed two formidable strike partnerships with two Wales internationals, first with Ron Hewitt and then with Derek Tapscott, after he joined the club from Arsenal. Bonsons's most prolific year came in the 1958–59 season when he scored 18 times for the club. At the end of the season he was transferred to Scunthorpe United in exchange for Peter Donnelly.

Bonson went on to spend the rest of his career playing in the lower leagues of English football with spells at Doncaster Rovers, Newport County, Brentford and Lincoln City.

He died in 1991.
