= Brian Jackson (footballer, born 1936) =

English footballer

Personal information
- Date of birth: 2 February 1936
- Place of birth: Maltby, England
- Date of death: 1992 (aged 55–56)
- Position: Wing half

Senior career*
Years	Team	Apps	(Gls)
	Maltby Main	?	(?)
1954–1965	Rotherham United	131	(6)
1965–1966	Barnsley	19	(0)
- * Club domestic league appearances and goals

Brian Jackson (2 February 1936 – 1992) was an English footballer.

== Career ==
Jackson played for Maltby Main, Rotherham United and Barnsley.
