= Steve Gammon =

Welsh footballer (born 1939)

Personal information
- Full name: Stephen George Gammon
- Date of birth: 24 September 1939 (age 87)
- Place of birth: Swansea, Wales
- Position: Midfielder

Senior career*
Years	Team	Apps	(Gls)
1958–1965	Cardiff City	66	(1)
1965–1971	Kettering Town	303	(6)

Managerial career
- 1965–1971: Kettering Town
- * Club domestic league appearances and goals

Stephen George Gammon (born 24 September 1939) is a Welsh former professional footballer. A Welsh under-23 international, Gammon's spent seven years with Cardiff City before a broken leg ended his professional career in 1965.

== Career ==
Gammon was born in Swansea, but began his career at Cardiff City, after being spotted playing for Mumbles Boys Club at the age of sixteen. He was handed a professional contract on his seventeenth birthday, making his debut, alongside fellow debutant Derek Tapscott, soon after in a 4–1 victory over Grimsby Town in September 1958 and his performances earned him a call up to the Wales under-23 side. The following season he scored his first, and only, goal for Cardiff in a 4–4 draw with Stoke City and helped the club gain promotion to Division One.

In February 1961, he suffered a major fracture in his leg after colliding with Denis Law during a league match against Manchester City. He attempted several comebacks after the injury but broke the same leg twice in the following three seasons and subsequently dropped out of professional football, joining Southern Football League side Kettering Town where he took over as manager of the side three months after his arrival. Gammon went on to make over 300 appearances in all competitions for Kettering. He left the club in December 1971, stepping down as manager after six years at Rockingham Road, being replaced by Ron Atkinson.
