= Harry Harris (footballer) =

Welsh footballer

Personal information
- Full name: Harry Harris
- Date of birth: 2 November 1933
- Place of birth: Magor, Wales
- Date of death: 9 June 2004 (aged 70)
- Position: Wing half

Youth career
- Undy United now known as Undy A.F.C.

Senior career*
Years	Team	Apps	(Gls)
1954–1958	Newport County	156	(57)
1958–1971	Portsmouth	380	(48)
1971	→ Newport County (loan)	16	(2)
- * Club domestic league appearances and goals

Harry Harris (26th October 1933 – 9 June 2004) was a Welsh professional footballer.

Harris was born in Magor, Monmouthshire. An inside-forward or wing half, he joined Newport County in 1954 from local club Undy United.

Harris moved to Portsmouth in 1958 making 380 appearances, scoring 48 goals. In 1971, he returned briefly to Newport on loan. In total Harris made 172 appearances for Newport scoring 59 goals.
