= Peter McCall (footballer) =

English footballer (1936–2020)

Personal information
- Date of birth: 11 September 1936
- Place of birth: West Ham, Essex, England
- Date of death: 9 February 2020 (aged 83)
- Position: Wing half

Senior career*
Years	Team	Apps	(Gls)
- King's Lynn
1957–1962	Bristol City	78	(1)
1962–1965	Oldham Athletic	108	(5)
1965–1967	Hereford United86 goals 9 appearances		(?)
Total		186	(6)
- * Club domestic league appearances and goals

Peter McCall (11 September 1936 – 9 February 2020) was an English footballer who played as a wing half in the Football League.
