= Brian Jenkins (footballer) =

Welsh footballer (1935–2021)

Personal information
- Full name: Brian Jenkins
- Date of birth: 1 August 1935
- Place of birth: Treherbert, Wales
- Date of death: August 2021 (aged 86)
- Place of death: Essex, England
- Position: Winger

Senior career*
Years	Team	Apps	(Gls)
1956–1961	Cardiff City	29	(7)
1961–1963	Exeter City	73	(11)
1963–1964	Bristol Rovers	7	(0)
1964–1967	Merthyr Tydfil		
1967–1971	King's Lynn		
- * Club domestic league appearances and goals

Brian Jenkins (1 August 1935 – August 2021) was a Welsh professional footballer. During his career, he made over 100 appearances in the Football League during spells with Cardiff City, Exeter City and Bristol Rovers. Jenkins died in Essex in August 2021, at the age of 86.

== Career ==
Born in Treherbert, Jenkins played local amateur football for Cwmparc before being spotted by Cardiff City in 1956. After impressing in the club's reserve side, making his professional debut on 9 November 1957 in a 1–1 draw with Ipswich Town. After appearing in fifteen consecutive league matches at the start of the 1958–59 season, Jenkins was called up by Wales as a late replacement for Phil Woosnam for a match against England on 26 November 1958 but did not feature in the match. However, he was displaced in the Cardiff side soon after by Colin Hudson and later Johnny Watkins. In June 1961, Jenkins joined Exeter City along with Derrick Sullivan for a combined fee of £5,000 and made his debut against Mansfield Town two months later.

In his second season at St James Park, he was placed on the transfer list with the club valuing him at £1,500. Several clubs registered interest before Jenkins chose to move to Bristol Rovers in July 1963 with Exeter waiving a potential transfer fee. After making seven league appearances for Rovers, Jenkins moved into non-league football with Merthyr Tydfill. In 1967, he joined King's Lynn, working in a local newsagents alongside his playing commitments. He scored seven goals in his first two matches for the club would go on to score over 100 goals during a four-year spell.
