= John McClelland (footballer, born 1935) =

English footballer (1935–2024)

Personal information
- Full name: John Bonar McClelland
- Date of birth: 5 March 1935
- Place of birth: Bradford, England
- Date of death: 15 June 2024 (aged 89)
- Position: Outside right

Youth career
- Manchester YMCA

Senior career*
Years	Team	Apps	(Gls)
1956–1958	Manchester City	8	(2)
1958–1961	Lincoln City	121	(32)
1961–1963	Queens Park Rangers	71	(22)
1963–1968	Portsmouth	137	(36)
1968–1969	Newport County	36	(10)
1969–1970	Waterlooville	22	(4)
Total		395	(106)
- * Club domestic league appearances and goals

John Bonar McClelland (5 March 1935 – 15 June 2024) was an English professional footballer who scored 102 goals from 373 games playing in the Football League for Manchester City, Lincoln City, Queens Park Rangers, Portsmouth and Newport County. He played as an outside right.

McClelland was born in Bradford, and began his professional football career with Manchester City. He joined Lincoln City in September 1958, in part exchange for George Hannah, and in his second season was the club's leading scorer with 18 goals. Queens Park Rangers paid £14,000 for his services at the start of the 1961–62 season. He stayed there two years before moving on to Portsmouth for £10,000, where he spent five years before finishing his league career with Newport County in 1968–69. He then returned to the Portsmouth area and played for Hampshire League side Waterlooville in 1969-70.

McClelland was married to former sprinter Heather Armitage. He died on 15 June 2024, at the age of 89.
