= Tommy Johnston =

Scottish footballer (1927–2008)

Personal information
- Full name: Thomas Bourhill Johnston
- Date of birth: 18 August 1927
- Place of birth: Loanhead, Scotland
- Date of death: 4 September 2008 (aged 81)
- Place of death: Shoalhaven, Australia
- Height: 5 ft 11 in (1.80 m)
- Position: Striker

Senior career*
Years	Team	Apps	(Gls)
1949–1951	Kilmarnock	19	(17)
1951–1952	Darlington	27	(9)
1952	Oldham Athletic	5	(3)
1952–1954	Norwich City	60	(28)
1954–1956	Newport County	63	(46)
1956–1958	Leyton Orient	87	(70)
1958–1959	Blackburn Rovers	36	(22)
1959–1961	Leyton Orient	93	(51)
1961	Gillingham	35	(10)
Total		425	(256)
- * Club domestic league appearances and goals

Thomas Bourhill Johnston (18 August 1927 – 4 September 2008) was a Scottish professional footballer who scored 256 goals from 425 appearances in the Scottish and English Football Leagues.

Johnston was the Football League Second Division top scorer for the 1957–58 season with 43 goals for Leyton Orient and Blackburn Rovers. He was Orient's all-time top scorer and in 1999 was voted their greatest player of all time.

He had a withered arm, a legacy of an injury received while he was a miner, and always played with this arm bandaged. Johnston and his family immigrated to Australia in 1972, and he died in Shoalhaven, New South Wales, on 4 September 2008.

The south stand at Orient's Brisbane Road ground was named the Tommy Johnston Stand in his honour, and his ashes were interred there.

== See also ==
- List of footballers in England by number of league goals (200+)
