= Mike Hughes (footballer) =

Welsh footballer (1940–2018)

Personal information
- Full name: Edward Michael Hughes
- Date of birth: 3 September 1940
- Place of birth: Llanidloes, Wales
- Date of death: 20 December 2018 (aged 78)
- Position: Midfielder

Senior career*
Years	Team	Apps	(Gls)
1958–1961	Cardiff City	1	(0)
1961–1963	Exeter City	36	(0)
1963–1969	Chesterfield	210	(9)
1969–1972	Yeovil Town		
1975-1979	Salisbury		
1979-	Taunton		
Total		247+	(9+)

Managerial career
- 1969–1972: Yeovil Town (player-manager)
- 1975-1979: Salisbury City
- 1979-: Taunton
- 1981: Shaftesbury Town
- 1983: Yeovil Town (caretaker)
- 1983–1986: Cirencester Town
- * Club domestic league appearances and goals

Edward Michael Hughes (3 September 1940 – 20 December 2018) was a Welsh professional footballer who made 247 appearances in the Football League playing as a midfielder for Cardiff City, Exeter City and Chesterfield. Hughes then became player-manager of Southern League side Yeovil Town, before leaving in 1972 to become a coach at Torquay United. In the summer of 1975, he was appointed as player-manager of Salisbury, remaining in charge for the following four seasons, after which he moved to Taunton Town in a similar role. Hughes returned to Yeovil as a caretaker manager in 1983, he also managed Cirencester Town.

Hughes died in December 2018 at the age of 78.
