= Ron Hewitt (footballer, born 1928) =

Welsh footballer

Personal information
- Full name: Ronald Hewitt
- Date of birth: 21 June 1928
- Place of birth: Flint, Wales
- Date of death: 23 September 2001 (aged 73)
- Position: Striker

Senior career*
Years	Team	Apps	(Gls)
1948–1950	Wolves	0	(0)
1949	→ Walsall (loan)	8	(2)
1950–1951	Darlington	36	(3)
1951–1957	Wrexham	204	(83)
1957–1959	Cardiff City	64	(27)
1959–1960	Wrexham	27	(11)
1960–1962	Coventry City	59	(23)
1962–1963	Chester	29	(6)
1963–1964	Hereford United	26	
1964–1965	Northwich Victoria		
1965–1966	Witton Albion		
1966–1967	Caernarfon Town	22	(15)
1967–1968	Barmouth & Dyffryn United		
1968–1971	Congleton Town	46	(24)

International career
1958	Wales	5	(1)
- * Club domestic league appearances and goals

Ronald Hewitt (21 June 1928 – 23 September 2001) was a Wales international footballer.

Hewitt was born in Flint, Flintshire. Having failed to break into the first team at Wolves, he had spells with Walsall and Darlington before moving to Wrexham. During his six years there he finished as the top scorer in three of the seasons and established himself as one of the club greats. He was selected to play for the Third Division North representative team in 1956/57. His form there persuaded fellow Welsh side Cardiff City to pay seven thousand pound for his services in 1957. He finished as topscorer in both of his two seasons at the club before returning to Wrexham for another season. He had spells at Coventry City, Chester City and Hereford United before moving into non-league football.

He made his debut for Wales against Israel in 1958 and was part of the Wales squad for the 1958 FIFA World Cup in Sweden.

Hewitt died at the age of 73 in September 2001.

Hewitt was an uncle of Everton coach Andy Holden, who also played for Chester and Wales.
