= John McMillan (footballer, born 1937) =

Scottish footballer (born 1937)

Personal information
- Full name: John Shaw McMillan
- Date of birth: 14 April 1937 (age 89)
- Place of birth: Renton, Scotland
- Position: Right winger

Youth career
- Vale of Leven Academy FP

Senior career*
Years	Team	Apps	(Gls)
1956–1958	Dumbarton	28	(7)
1957–1958	Cardiff City	2	(0)
1961–1962	Exeter City	20	(1)
- * Club domestic league appearances and goals

John Shaw McMillan (born 14 April 1937) is a Scottish footballer, who played for Dumbarton, Cardiff City and Exeter City.

In 1957 McMillan joined Dumbarton, as an amateur, He caught the eye by hitting 10 goals in 30 matches for the Sons, and on 3 February 1958 he played in a Scottish Amateur XI trial match against his home club Dumbarton in a 2–2 draw, scoring one of the goals. At the time he was working at the Royal Naval Torpedo Factory, Alexandria and still had three months of his apprenticeship to go.

He then joined Cardiff City where he stay for four seasons, but it was difficult for him to make the first team. He was doing his national service at the time and played for the RAF team.

He then joined Exeter City McMillan scored on his debut in a 1–1 draw against Oldham.

Family reasons then took McMillan back to Wales, he went to Margate briefly, but his wife Margaret wanted to be closer to her mother in Cardiff and he then joined Barry Town of the Southern League. One of the reasons he joined Barry Town was he would be able to get a job with the shipping repair firm at Barry Docks owned by the family of John Bailey, the club's chairman at the time.

He later played for Merthyr Tydfil before dropping down into the Welsh Leagues. Jack was an accomplished golfer and a lifelong member at Dinas Powis Golf Club.

Well into his eighties, McMillan continued to live in the Vale of Glamorgan and died in May 2025.
