= Alec Milne =

Scottish footballer

Personal information
- Full name: Alexander Soutar Milne
- Date of birth: 4 June 1937 (age 89)
- Place of birth: Dundee, Scotland
- Position: Defender

Senior career*
Years	Team	Apps	(Gls)
1954–1955	Dundee Violet		
1955–1957	Arbroath	40	(0)
1957–1965	Cardiff City	172	(1)
1965–?	Barry Town		
1965	Toronto Inter-Roma		

International career
1959	Scotland U23	1	(0)
- * Club domestic league appearances and goals

Alexander Soutar Milne (born 4 June 1937) is a Scottish former professional footballer.

== Career ==
Born in Dundee, Milne began his career at Arbroath before moving to Cardiff City in 1957. By the end of his first season at the club he had established himself in the side. He was a vital part of the Cardiff squad at the time, being ever present in the 1958–59 and 1961–62 seasons, scoring his only league goal in a 3–2 defeat to Wolverhampton Wanderers in the latter.

He had injury problems in 1964/65 and drifted out of contention for a place in the Cardiff team.

He was allowed to leave the club soon after and finished his career at Barry Town before emigrating to Canada in 1965 to play in the Eastern Canada Professional Soccer League with Toronto Inter-Roma.
