= Brayley Reynolds =

Welsh footballer

Personal information
- Full name: Arthur Brayley Reynolds
- Date of birth: 30 May 1935
- Place of birth: Blackwood, Wales
- Date of death: 4 September 2023 (aged 88)
- Place of death: Blackwood, Wales
- Position: Centre-forward

Senior career*
Years	Team	Apps	(Gls)
1956–1959	Cardiff City	55	(14)
1959–1965	Swansea Town	151	(57)
- * Club domestic league appearances and goals

Arthur Brayley Reynolds (30 May 1935 – 4 September 2023) was a Welsh professional footballer.

== Club career ==
Born in Blackwood, Reynolds began his career playing for Lovell's Athletic, where his performances persuaded Cardiff City to sign him for a fee of £2,500. After impressing in the club's reserve side, he was handed his Football League debut in October 1956 during a 4–1 defeat to Leeds United. He went on to make over 50 appearances for the side but was unable to establish himself as a first team regular due to a series of injuries. In May 1959 he left to join South Wales rivals Swansea Town for £6,000, scoring 16 goals in all competitions during his first season at the Vetch Field.

During the 1961–62 season, Reynolds scored his highest goal tally in a season with 18 in all competitions and finished as the club's top scorer for a second time two years later, during the 1963–64 season. He spent 6 years at the club before moving into non-league football in 1965.

== After football ==
After retiring from football, Reynolds worked at the Penallta Colliery, near Hengoed.

Reynolds was also a keen cricketer and played for Blackwood Town for many years, captaining the team's 2nd XI in 1980.
