= Derrick Sullivan =

Welsh footballer

Personal information
- Date of birth: 10 August 1930
- Place of birth: Newport, Wales
- Date of death: 31 August 1983 (aged 53)
- Height: 5 ft 10 in (1.78 m)
- Position: Defender

Senior career*
Years	Team	Apps	(Gls)
1947–1961	Cardiff City	276	(18)
1961–1962	Exeter City	44	(0)
1962–1963	Newport County	23	(0)
1963–1964	Hereford United	11	(?)
1964–?	Ebbw Vale	?	(?)

International career
1953–1959	Wales	17	(0)
- * Club domestic league appearances and goals

Derrick Sullivan (10 August 1930 – 31 August 1983) was a Wales international football player. A defender, he played his club football for Cardiff City.

== Club career ==
After coming through the ranks at Cardiff he made his debut in April 1948 against Newcastle United. Sullivan spent more than a decade at Cardiff and played in nearly all outfield positions for the club. He eventually moved to Exeter City and then Newport County before moving into non-league football with Hereford United and Ebbw Vale.

== International career ==
He was part of the Wales squad for the 1958 FIFA World Cup in Sweden.
