= Colin Hudson =

Welsh footballer

Personal information
- Full name: Colin Arthur Richard Hudson
- Date of birth: 5 October 1935
- Place of birth: Chepstow, Wales
- Date of death: 2005 (aged 69–70)
- Place of death: Monmouth, Wales
- Position: Outside forward

Senior career*
| Years | Team | Apps | (Gls) |
| 1954–1957 | Newport County | 82 | (21) |
| 1957–1961 | Cardiff City | 61 | (9) |
| 1961–1962 | Brighton & Hove Albion | 1 | (0) |
| 1962–1963 | Newport County | 30 | (2) |
| 1964 | Bath City | | |
- * Club domestic league appearances and goals

Colin Arthur Richard Hudson (5 October 1935 – 2005) was a Welsh professional footballer. During his career, he made over 150 appearances in the Football League during spells with Newport County, Cardiff City and Brighton & Hove Albion.

== Career ==
After playing for local side Undy United, Hudson joined Newport County in April 1954 and, after completing his national service, he established himself in the first team, scoring 21 goals in 82 league appearances. In 1957, he joined Cardiff City in exchange for Cecil Dixon, Neil O'Halloran and John McSeveney joining Newport. He made his debut for the club on the opening day of the 1957–58 season during a 0–0 draw with Swansea Town, scoring his first goal in a 7–0 victory over Barnsley on 7 December 1957.

Nicknamed "Rocky", he spent four seasons with Cardiff but struggled to maintain a regular place in the first team. On 28 December 1957, he scored the first goal during a 6–1 victory over Liverpool, a day on which he also got married. He helped the side win the Welsh Cup in 1959, scoring his side's second goal in a 2–0 victory over Lovell's Athletic in the final. The following season, he was part of the Cardiff side that won promotion to the First Division after finishing as runners-up in Division Two and reached a second consecutive Welsh Cup final, losing 1–0 to Wrexham in a replay. Hudson left Cardiff in 1961 to join Brighton & Hove Albion, playing one league match, before finishing his professional career with a second spell at Newport County. He later moved into non-league football, playing for Bath City.

Hudson died in Monmouth in 2005.

== Honours ==
Cardiff City

- Welsh Cup winner: 1959
