= Derek Tapscott =

Welsh footballer

Personal information
- Full name: Derek Robert Tapscott
- Date of birth: 30 June 1932
- Place of birth: Barry, Wales
- Date of death: 12 June 2008 (aged 75)
- Place of death: Cardiff, Wales
- Height: 5 ft 9 in (1.75 m)
- Position: Inside right

Senior career*
Years	Team	Apps	(Gls)
1949–1953	Barry Town	57	(28)
1953–1958	Arsenal	132	(68)
1958–1965	Cardiff City	194	(79)
1965–1966	Newport County	13	(1)
- Cinderford Town
- Haverfordwest County
- Carmarthen Town

International career
1954–1959	Wales	14	(4)
- * Club domestic league appearances and goals

Derek Robert Tapscott (30 June 1932 – 12 June 2008) was a Welsh professional footballer who played as a forward. Tapscott played for Barry Town, Arsenal, Cardiff City, Newport County, Cinderford Town, Haverfordwest County and Carmarthen Town. He also featured for the Welsh national team. Tapscott is Cardiff City's sixth highest goalscorer of all time.

== Early life ==
Born in Barry, to Florence and Stanley, Tapscott was one of sixteen children. As a child he began attending High Street Junior School in August 1936 where he remained until leaving school at the age of 14. Having left school, he worked as a delivery boy for a local butcher and later an assistant to a television repairman before becoming an apprentice bricklayer at the age of 16.

In October 1950, he was called up for his national service, joining 4 Training Regiment of the Royal Engineers. Despite this, Tapscott was regularly granted permission to return to South Wales on match weekends to play for Barry Town. Within three months of his conscription, he became a member of the drill staff and was later promoted to Corporal. During his national service, Tapscott served alongside his future Arsenal teammate Jim Fotheringham.

== Club career ==
=== Arsenal ===
Tapscott played for Barry Town as a youth whilst continuing his work as a bricklayer. He was eventually signed by manager Tom Whittaker of Arsenal for £4,000 in October 1953. This move came about after he spent time on trial at the club's North London rivals Tottenham Hotspur. He started off with a prolific run in the reserves, scoring thirteen goals in fifteen matches in the London Combination League. After such he made his first-team debut against Liverpool on 10 April 1954 and scored twice. Tapscott went on to score five more goals in as many matches that season.

The young Welsh inside forward became a regular in the following 1954–55 season as he missed only five matches. Despite not being played as a centre forward he was the club's top goal scorer within the 1955–56 and 1956–57 seasons with 21 and 27 goals, respectively. His club form saw him play and start in a London XI side which won by 1-0 against a Basel XI in the Inter-Cities Fairs Cup on 4 May 1956.

Tapscott played for the Gunners in Manchester United's last ever domestic match before the Munich air disaster in February 1958 - a 5-4 win for the visitors in a game Tapscott described as "the best I ever played in". An injury sustained while playing for Wales during the 1957–58 season, put Tapscott out of Arsenal's first team, and he then struggled to oust his replacement Vic Groves once he had returned to full fitness. He thus left Arsenal in September 1958, moving to Cardiff City, whom he had rejected earlier on in the season. In all, he scored 68 goals in 132 matches for Arsenal.

=== Cardiff City ===
Joining the "Bluebirds" for a fee of £10,000, Tapscott made his debut in a 4–1 win over Grimsby Town. Cardiff, managed by his former manager at Barry Town, Bill Jones, won promotion back to the First Division in 1960. This came with Tapscott forming an effective partnership with his ex-Arsenal teammate Brian Walsh. Tapscott is also the club's record holder for the most goals scored within a game with six netted during a 16–0 win over Knighton Town in the Welsh Cup.

Tapscott was also part of the Cardiff side that played in the club's first ever European competition when they reached the quarter-finals of the UEFA Cup Winners' Cup, including scoring the winning goal against Sporting Clube de Portugal in the second round. He played his final game for Cardiff on 6 February 1965 in a 2–0 defeat to Northampton Town as injury kept him out of the side for the remainder of the 1964–65 season and at the end of the season he was released.

Altogether Tapscott scored 102 goals from a sum of 234 appearances for the club making him Cardiff City's sixth-highest goalscorer of all time.

=== Later career ===
Following his release, Tapscott received offers from South African side Addington and a player-manager role at Sligo Rovers but, not wanting to move away from his Cardiff home, he signed for Division Four side Newport County. However, he appeared just 15 times for the club, scoring one goal during a 3–1 win over Bradford City on 7 March 1966, before leaving at the end of the 1965–66 season. He later moved into non-league football with spells at Cinderford Town, Haverfordwest County and Carmarthen Town before retiring in 1970.

== International career ==
Having made just one appearance for the Arsenal first team, Tapscott was named in the Wales squad for a match with Austria. On 9 May 1954 Tapscott made his Wales debut in a 2–0 defeat to Austria in Vienna. Including his debut, Tapscott played in nine consecutive matches between 1954 and 1956, scoring his first international goal during a 2–1 win over England on 22 October 1955. However, Tapscott did not go to Sweden for the tournament itself, reportedly after refusing to sign for Cardiff City. He was recalled to the Wales squad after the world cup as part of the squad for the 1959 British Home Championship, scoring in the final two matches of the competition in matches against England and Northern Ireland. In total, Tapscott won 14 caps for his country, scoring four goals.

=== International goals ===
Results list Wales' goal tally first.

Goal	Date	Venue	Opponent	Result	Competition
1.	22 October 1955	Ninian Park, Cardiff, Wales	England	2–1	1956 British Home Championship
2.	23 November 1955	Racecourse Ground, Wrexham, Wales	Austria	1–2	Friendly
3.	26 November 1958	Villa Park, Birmingham, England	England	2–2	1959 British Home Championship
4.	22 April 1959	Racecourse Ground, Wrexham, Wales	Northern Ireland	1–4	1959 British Home Championship

== After football ==
After retiring from playing he moved into business, working in the sporting goods trade for Gola and Diadora until his retirement in 1997. Tapscott then went on to write his autobiography that was published in 2004 which he entitled Tappy: From Barry Town to Arsenal, Cardiff City and Beyond.

He died on 12 June 2008, leaving his wife Glenys, two daughters and three grandchildren. In 2012, his old team Barry Town inducted him into the club's hall of fame.

== Honours ==
=== Club ===
Cardiff City

- Welsh Cup: 1959

=== Individual ===
- Barry Town Hall of Fame: 2012
