= Gerry Young =

English footballer (1936–2020)

Gerald Young
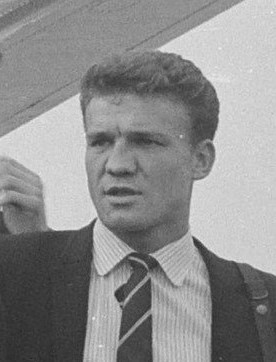
- Young in 1963

Personal information
- Full name: Gerald Morton Young
- Date of birth: 1 October 1936
- Place of birth: Harton, County Durham, England
- Date of death: 1 September 2020 (aged 83)
- Height: 5 ft 10 1/2 in (1.79 m)
- Position: Left half

Youth career
- Newcastle United

Senior career*
Years	Team	Apps	(Gls)
- Hawthorne Leslie
1955–1971	Sheffield Wednesday	310	(13)

International career
1964	England	1	(0)
- * Club domestic league appearances and goals

Gerald Morton Young (1 October 1936 – 2 September 2020) was an English footballer who played mainly as a left half. He spent his entire 14-year professional career at Sheffield Wednesday. He made one appearance for England in 1964.

== Playing career ==
Born in Harton in South Shields, Young played schools' football in Jarrow. He was on the books of Newcastle United at the age of 16, but returned to junior football after finding opportunities limited. Upon leaving school, Young played for the Hawthorn Leslie shipyard team in Hebburn, then in County Durham. Young signed for Sheffield Wednesday in the early part of 1955 as a centre forward, however his chances of breaking into the side were restricted by the presence of players of the calibre of Redfern Froggatt and Roy Shiner. He made his debut on 2 March 1957 in an away defeat at Blackpool, but did not become a regular in the Wednesday side until December 1962 when Tony Kay was sold to Everton and Young was switched to central defence by manager Vic Buckingham as a replacement. While playing as a forward in the 1961–62 season he scored a hat trick in the Inter-Cities Fairs Cup against A.S. Roma.

Young was an ever-present in the following 1963–64 season when Wednesday finished sixth in Division One. His good form earned him an England call up on 18 November 1964, against Wales. He was called up again for the following match against the Netherlands in December 1964 but had to pull out after rupturing a thigh muscle; he missed most of the rest of that season and never got the chance to play for England again.

Young was part of the Sheffield Wednesday side which reached the FA Cup final in 1966 playing in all six matches. Young's part in that final will always be remembered for the mistake he made to allow Derek Temple to score the winning goal in a 3–2 victory for Everton. Young failed to control a long downfield punt, Temple dispossessed him and ran on to beat Wednesday goalkeeper Ron Springett. Gerry Young stayed with Wednesday until he retired at the end of the 1970–71 season he played 310 league games (345 including cup games) scoring 20 goals. He formed a central defensive partnership with Vic Mobley during the period from 1964 to 1969, his final game was on 2 January 1971 in a 1–4 FA Cup 3rd round defeat at Tottenham Hotspur.

== After playing ==
Young joined the Sheffield Wednesday staff on retiring from playing in 1971, initially as coach of the second team, and later as chief coach. He remained in that position until October 1975 when he was sacked along with manager Steve Burtenshaw after Wednesday dropped down to the Third Division. Gerry Young then went into business with former Wednesday player John Quinn opening a sports and trophy shop on Middlewood Road which stayed in business for many years. He later joined the staff at Barnsley. He died on 2 September 2020 at the age of 83.

== Honours ==
Sheffield Wednesday

- FA Cup runner-up: 1965–66
