= Italy national football team results (1970–1989) =

- Win Draw Loss

This is a list of the Italy national football team results from 1970 to 1989. During this period, Italy achieved first place at the 1982 FIFA World Cup and second place at the 1970 World Cup.

== Results ==
=== 1970 ===
21 February 1970 International friendly	Spain	2–2	Italy	Madrid, Spain
21:00 CET (UTC+01:00)	Salvadore 23' (o.g.); Arieta 25'	Report	Anastasi 11'; Riva 18'	Stadium: Santiago Bernabéu Stadium; Attendance: 80,000; Referee: Kurt Tschenscher (West Germany)

10 May 1970 International friendly	Portugal	1–2	Italy	Lisbon, Portugal
16:00 CET (UTC+01:00)	Coelho 85'	Report	Riva 38', 67'	Stadium: Estádio Nacional; Attendance: 20,711; Referee: Antonio Camacho Jiménez (Spain)

3 June 1970 1970 FIFA World Cup; Group 2	Italy	1–0	Sweden	Toluca, Mexico
16:00 CST (UTC−06:00)	Domenghini 10'	Report		Stadium: Estadio Luis Dosal; Attendance: 13,433; Referee: Jack Taylor (England)

6 June 1970 1970 FIFA World Cup; Group 2	Uruguay	0–0	Italy	Puebla, Mexico
16:00 CST (UTC−06:00)		Report		Stadium: Estadio Cuauhtémoc; Attendance: 29,968; Referee: Rudi Glöckner (East Germany)

11 June 1970 1970 FIFA World Cup; Group 2	Italy	0–0	Israel	Toluca, Mexico
16:00 CST (UTC−06:00)		Report		Stadium: Estadio Luis Dosal; Attendance: 9,890; Referee: Ayrton Vieira de Moraes (Brazil)

14 June 1970 1970 FIFA World Cup; Quarter-final	Italy	4–1	Mexico	Toluca, Mexico
12:00 CST (UTC−06:00)	Guzmán 25' (o.g.); Riva 63', 76'; Rivera 70'	Report	González 13'	Stadium: Estadio Luis Dosal; Attendance: 26,851; Referee: Rudolf Scheurer (Switzerland)

17 June 1970 1970 FIFA World Cup; Semi-final	Italy	4–3 (a.e.t.)	West Germany	Mexico City, Mexico
16:00 CST (UTC−06:00)	Boninsegna 8'; Burgnich 98'; Riva 104'; Rivera 111'	Report	Schnellinger 90'; Müller 94', 110'	Stadium: Estadio Azteca; Attendance: 102,444; Referee: Arturo Yamasaki (Mexico)

21 June 1970 1970 FIFA World Cup; Final	Brazil	4–1	Italy	Mexico City, Mexico
12:00 CST (UTC−06:00)	Pelé 18'; Gérson 66'; Jairzinho 71'; Carlos Alberto 86'	Report	Boninsegna 37'	Stadium: Estadio Azteca; Attendance: 107,412; Referee: Rudi Glöckner (East Germany)

17 October 1970 International friendly	Switzerland	1–1	Italy	Bern, Switzerland
15:30 CET (UTC+01:00)	Blättler 16'	Report	A. Mazzola 85'	Stadium: Wankdorf Stadium; Attendance: 45,000; Referee: Kurt Tschenscher (West Germany)

31 October 1970 UEFA Euro 1972 qualifying Group 6	Austria	1–2	Italy	Vienna, Austria
15:00 CET (UTC+01:00)	Parits 29'	Report	De Sisti 27'; A. Mazzola 34'	Stadium: Praterstadion; Attendance: 54,953; Referee: Laurens van Ravens (Netherlands)

8 December 1970 UEFA Euro 1972 qualifying Group 6	Italy	3–0	Republic of Ireland	Florence, Italy
14:30 CET (UTC+01:00)	De Sisti 22' (pen.); Boninsegna 42'; Prati 84'	Report		Stadium: Stadio Comunale; Attendance: 41,092; Referee: Robert Schaut (Belgium)

=== 1971 ===
20 February 1971 International friendly	Italy	1–2	Spain	Cagliari, Italy
14:30 CET (UTC+01:00)	De Sisti 79'	Report	Pirri 35'; Uriarte 40'	Stadium: Stadio Sant'Elia; Attendance: 27,492; Referee: Robert Frauciel (France)

10 May 1971 UEFA Euro 1972 qualifying Group 6	Republic of Ireland	1–2	Italy	Dublin, Republic of Ireland
18:00 IST (UTC+01:00)	Conway 23'	Report	Boninsegna 15'; Prati 59'	Stadium: Lansdowne Road; Attendance: 22,613; Referee: Gerhard Schulenburg (West Germany)

9 June 1971 UEFA Euro 1972 qualifying Group 6	Sweden	0–0	Italy	Stockholm, Sweden
19:00 CET (UTC+01:00)		Report		Stadium: Råsunda Stadion; Attendance: 36,528; Referee: Rudolf Scheurer (Switzerland)

25 September 1971 International friendly	Italy	2–0	Mexico	Genoa, Italy
17:00 CEST (UTC+02:00)	Boninsegna 60', 64'	Report		Stadium: Stadio Luigi Ferraris; Attendance: 43,350; Referee: José María Ortiz de Mendíbil (Spain)

9 October 1971 UEFA Euro 1972 qualifying Group 6	Italy	3–0	Sweden	Milan, Italy
14:30 CET (UTC+01:00)	Riva 3', 83'; Boninsegna 41'	Report		Stadium: San Siro; Attendance: 65,582; Referee: Roger Machin (France)

20 November 1971 UEFA Euro 1972 qualifying Group 6	Italy	2–2	Austria	Rome, Italy
14:30 CET (UTC+01:00)	Prati 10'; De Sisti 75'	Report	Jara 36'; Sara 59'	Stadium: Stadio Olimpico; Attendance: 58,752; Referee: Gyula Emsberger (Hungary)

=== 1972 ===
4 March 1972 International friendly	Greece	2–1	Italy	Piraeus, Greece
15:00 EET (UTC+02:00)	Antoniadis 12'; Pomonis 55'	Report	Boninsegna 19'	Stadium: Karaiskakis Stadium; Attendance: 15,000; Referee: Liuben Radunchev (Bulgaria)

29 April 1972 UEFA Euro 1972 qualifying Quarter finals	Italy	0–0	Belgium	Milan, Italy
15:30 CET (UTC+01:00)		Report		Stadium: San Siro; Attendance: 63,549; Referee: Petar Nikolov (Bulgaria)

13 May 1972 UEFA Euro 1972 qualifying Quarter finals	Belgium	2–1	Italy	Brussels, Belgium
20:00 CET (UTC+01:00)	Van Moer 23'; Van Himst 71'	Report	Riva 86' (pen.)	Stadium: Stade Émile Versé; Attendance: 26,561; Referee: Paul Schiller (Austria)

17 June 1972 International friendly	Romania	3–3	Italy	Bucharest, Romania
20:00 EET (UTC+02:00)	Spinosi 19' (o.g.); Domide 59'; Hajnal 89'	Report	Prati 33', 34'; Causio 74'	Stadium: Stadionul Național; Attendance: 25,516; Referee: Milivoje Gugulović (Yugoslavia)

21 June 1972 International friendly	Bulgaria	1–1	Italy	Sofia, Bulgaria
19:00 EET (UTC+02:00)	Bonev 42'	Report	Chinaglia 50'	Stadium: Vasil Levski National Stadium; Attendance: 16,500; Referee: Giorgos Katsoras (Greece)

20 September 1972 International friendly	Italy	3–1	Yugoslavia	Turin, Italy
16:30 CEST (UTC+02:00)	Riva 54'; Chinaglia 71'; Anastasi 83'	Report	Vukotić 73'	Stadium: Stadio Comunale; Attendance: 59,000; Referee: Vital Loraux (Belgium)

7 October 1972 1974 FIFA World Cup qualification Group 2	Luxembourg	0–4	Italy	Luxembourg City, Luxembourg
15:15 CET (UTC+01:00)		Report	Chinaglia 3'; Riva 6', 36'; Capello 62'	Stadium: Stade Municipal; Attendance: 9,378; Referee: Robert Wurtz (France)

21 October 1972 1974 FIFA World Cup qualification Group 2	Switzerland	0–0	Italy	Bern, Switzerland
19:00 CET (UTC+01:00)		Report		Stadium: Wankdorf Stadium; Attendance: 54,000; Referee: Kurt Tschenscher (West Germany)

=== 1973 ===
13 January 1973 1974 FIFA World Cup qualification Group 2	Italy	0–0	Turkey	Naples, Italy
14:30 CET (UTC+01:00)		Report		Stadium: Stadio San Paolo; Attendance: 60,400; Referee: Karlo Kruashvili (Soviet Union)

25 February 1973 1974 FIFA World Cup qualification Group 2	Turkey	0–1	Italy	Istanbul, Turkey
14:30 EET (UTC+02:00)		Report	Anastasi 35'	Stadium: Mithat Paşa Stadium; Attendance: 40,000; Referee: Abdelkader Aouissi (Algeria)

31 March 1973 1974 FIFA World Cup qualification Group 2	Italy	5–0	Luxembourg	Genoa, Italy
15:30 CET (UTC+01:00)	Riva 18', 45', 70', 80'; Rivera 63'	Report		Stadium: Stadio Luigi Ferraris; Attendance: 50,000; Referee: Hédi Saoudi (Tunisia)

9 June 1973 International friendly	Italy	2–0	Brazil	Rome, Italy
18:30 CEST (UTC+02:00)	Riva 16'; Capello 76'	Report		Stadium: Stadio Olimpico; Attendance: 75,000; Referee: Robert Héliès (France)

14 June 1973 International friendly	Italy	2–0	England	Turin, Italy
18:30 CEST (UTC+02:00)	Anastasi 38'; Capello 52'	Report		Stadium: Stadio Comunale; Attendance: 50,000; Referee: Tsvetan Stanev (Bulgaria)

29 September 1973 International friendly	Italy	2–0	Sweden	Milan, Italy
16:00 CEST (UTC+02:00)	Anastasi 60'; Riva 66'	Report		Stadium: San Siro; Attendance: 65,454; Referee: Jack Taylor (England)

20 October 1973 1974 FIFA World Cup qualification Group 2	Italy	2–0	Switzerland	Rome, Italy
15:00 CET (UTC+02:00)	Rivera 39'; Riva 79'	Report		Stadium: Stadio Olimpico; Attendance: 75,000; Referee: Antonio Camacho Jiménez (Spain)

14 November 1973 International friendly	England	0–1	Italy	London, England
20:00 GMT (UTC±00:00)		Report	Capello 86'	Stadium: Wembley Stadium; Attendance: 100,000; Referee: Francisco Lobo (Portugal)

=== 1974 ===
26 February 1974 International friendly	Italy	0–0	West Germany	Rome, Italy
15:00 CET (UTC+01:00)		Report		Stadium: Stadio Olimpico; Attendance: 82,000; Referee: Anton Bucheli (Switzerland)

8 June 1974 International friendly	Austria	0–0	Italy	Wien, Austria
16:30 CET (UTC+01:00)		Report		Stadium: Ernst-Happel-Stadion; Attendance: 47,702; Referee: Alfred Delcourt (Belgium)

15 June 1974 1974 FIFA World Cup; Group 4	Italy	3–1	Haiti	Munich, West Germany
18:00 CET (UTC+01:00)	Rivera 52'; Benetti 66'; Anastasi 79'	Report	Sanon 46'	Stadium: Olympiastadion; Attendance: 53,000; Referee: Vicente Llobregat (Venezuela)

19 June 1974 1974 FIFA World Cup; Group 4	Argentina	1–1	Italy	Stuttgart, West Germany
19:30 CET (UTC+01:00)	Houseman 20'	Report	Perfumo 35' (o.g.)	Stadium: Neckarstadion; Attendance: 70,100; Referee: Pavel Kazakov (Soviet Union)

23 June 1974 1974 FIFA World Cup; Group 4	Poland	2–1	Italy	Stuttgart, West Germany
16:00 CET (UTC+01:00)	Szarmach 38'; Deyna 44'	Report	Capello 85'	Stadium: Neckarstadion; Attendance: 70,100; Referee: Hans-Joachim Weyland (West Germany)

28 September 1974^{1} International friendly	Yugoslavia	1–0	Italy	Zagreb, Yugoslavia
18:00 CET (UTC+01:00)	Šurjak 41'	Report		Stadium: Stadion Maksimir; Attendance: 40,000; Referee: Emsberger Gyula (Hungary)

20 November 1974 UEFA Euro 1976 qualifying Group 5	Netherlands	3–1	Italy	Rotterdam, Netherlands
20:30 CET (UTC+01:00)	Rensenbrink 24'; Cruyff 64', 80'	Report	Boninsegna 5'	Stadium: Feyenoord Stadium; Attendance: 58,463; Referee: Pavel Kazakov (Soviet Union)

29 December 1974 International friendly	Italy	0–0	Bulgaria	Genoa, Italy
14:30 CET (UTC+01:00)		Report		Stadium: Stadio Luigi Ferraris; Attendance: 45,000; Referee: Sergio Gonella (Italy)

=== 1975 ===
19 April 1975 UEFA Euro 1976 qualifying Group 5	Italy	0–0	Poland	Rome, Italy
15:30 CET (UTC+01:00)		Report		Stadium: Stadio Olimpico; Attendance: 66,048; Referee: Robert Héliès (France)

5 June 1975 UEFA Euro 1976 qualifying Group 5	Finland	0–1	Italy	Helsinki, Finland
19:00 EET (UTC+02:00)		Report	Chinaglia 26'	Stadium: Olympiastadion; Attendance: 17,732; Referee: Walter Eschweiler (West Germany)

8 June 1975 International friendly	Soviet Union	1–0	Italy	Moscow, Soviet Union
17:00 MT (UTC+03:00)	Konkov 63'	Report		Stadium: Central Lenin Stadium; Attendance: 60,000; Referee: Miloš Kajić (Yugoslavia)

27 September 1975^{1} UEFA Euro 1976 qualifying Group 5	Italy	0–0	Finland	Rome, Italy
16:30 CEST (UTC+02:00)		Report		Stadium: Stadio Olimpico; Attendance: 29,203; Referee: Costas Xanthoulis (Cyprus)

26 October 1975 UEFA Euro 1976 qualifying Group 5	Poland	0–0	Italy	Warsaw, Poland
14:00 CET (UTC+01:00)		Report		Stadium: Stadion Dziesięciolecia; Attendance: 59,773; Referee: Paul Schiller (Austria)

22 November 1975 UEFA Euro 1976 qualifying Group 5	Italy	1–0	Netherlands	Rome, Italy
14:30 CET (UTC+01:00)	Capello 20'	Report		Stadium: Stadio Olimpico; Attendance: 33,307; Referee: Robert Schaut (Belgium)

30 December 1975 International friendly	Italy	3–2	Greece	Florence, Italy
14:30 CET (UTC+01:00)	Pulici 6', 45'; Savoldi 60' (pen.)	Report	Kritikopoulos 35'; Sarafis 53'	Stadium: Stadio Comunale; Attendance: 35,000; Referee: Miloš Kajić (Yugoslavia)

=== 1976 ===
7 April 1976 International friendly	Italy	3–1	Portugal	Turin, Italy
19:00 CET (UTC+01:00)	Antognoni 45'; Graziani 62'; Pulici 70'	Report	Fraguito 82'	Stadium: Stadio Comunale; Attendance: 45,000; Referee: Károly Palotai (Hungary)

23 May 1976 1976 U.S.A. Bicentennial Cup Tournament	Team America (United States)	0–4	Italy	Washington D.C., United States
13:00 EDT (UTC−04:00)		Report	Capello 15'; Pulici 22'; Graziani 72'; Rocca 84'	Stadium: Robert F. Kennedy Memorial Stadium; Attendance: 33,455; Referee: Walter Hungerbühler (Switzerland)

28 May 1976 1976 U.S.A. Bicentennial Cup Tournament	England	3–2	Italy	Bronx, United States
20:00 EDT (UTC−04:00)	Channon 46', 53'; Thompson 48'	Report	Graziani 14', 19'	Stadium: Yankee Stadium; Attendance: 46,650; Referee: Hans-Joachim Weyland (West Germany)

31 May 1976 1976 U.S.A. Bicentennial Cup Tournament	Brazil	4–1	Italy	New Haven, United States
15:00 EDT (UTC−04:00)	Gil 28', 48'; Zico 76'; Dinamite 78'	Report	Capello 2'	Stadium: Yale Bowl; Attendance: 36,096; Referee: Ramón Barreto (Uruguay)

5 June 1976 International friendly	Italy	4–2	Romania	Milan, Italy
18:00 CEST (UTC+02:00)	Graziani 49'; Antognoni 60'; Bettega 70', 74'	Report	Lucescu 65'; Georgescu 77'	Stadium: San Siro; Attendance: 30,329; Referee: Paul Schiller (Austria)

22 September 1976 International friendly	Denmark	0–1	Italy	Copenhagen, Denmark
19:00 CET (UTC+01:00)		Report	Pulici 18'	Stadium: Idrætsparken; Attendance: 30,000; Referee: Wolfgang Riedel (East Germany)

25 September 1976 International friendly	Italy	3–0	Yugoslavia	Rome, Italy
19:00 CEST (UTC+02:00)	Bettega 33', 83'; Graziani 73'	Report		Stadium: Stadio Olimpico; Attendance: 40,000; Referee: Pablo Sánchez Ibáñez (Spain)

16 October 1976 1978 FIFA World Cup qualification Group 2	Luxembourg	1–4	Italy	Luxembourg City, Luxembourg
14:30 CET (UTC+01:00)	Braun 86'	Report	Graziani 24'; Bettega 44', 81'; Antognoni 50'	Stadium: Stade Municipal; Attendance: 9,000; Referee: Ernst Dörflinger (Switzerland)

17 November 1976 1978 FIFA World Cup qualification Group 2	Italy	2–0	England	Rome, Italy
14:30 CET (UTC+01:00)	Antognoni 36'; Bettega 77'	Report		Stadium: Stadio Olimpico; Attendance: 80,000; Referee: Abraham Klein (Israel)

22 December 1976 International friendly	Portugal	2–1	Italy	Lisbon, Portugal
21:30 WET (UTC±00:00)	Nené 12', 66'	Report	Bettega 78'	Stadium: Estádio José Alvalade; Attendance: 36,121; Referee: Emilio Guruceta Muro (Spain)

=== 1977 ===
26 January 1977 International friendly	Italy	2–1	Belgium	Rome, Italy
14:30 CET (UTC+01:00)	Graziani 24'; Meeuws 77' (o.g.)	Report	Piot 85' (pen.)	Stadium: Stadio Olimpico; Attendance: 25,000; Referee: Erich Linemayr (Austria)

8 June 1977 1978 FIFA World Cup qualification Group 2	Finland	0–3	Italy	Helsinki, Finland
19:00 EET (UTC+02:00)		Report	Gentile 8'; Bettega 56'; Benetti 81'	Stadium: Olympiastadion; Attendance: 18,000; Referee: Robert Héliès (France)

8 October 1977 International friendly	West Germany	2–1	Italy	West Berlin, West Germany
15:30 CET (UTC+01:00)	Kaltz 32'; Rummenigge 58'	Report	Antognoni 75'	Stadium: Olympiastadion; Attendance: 80,000; Referee: Francis Rion (Belgium)

15 October 1977 1978 FIFA World Cup qualification Group 2	Italy	6–1	Finland	Turin, Italy
15:00 CET (UTC+01:00)	Bettega 29', 38', 59', 62'; Graziani 45'; Zaccarelli 71'	Report	Haaskivi 67'	Stadium: Stadio Comunale; Attendance: 65,000; Referee: Nikola Dudin (Bulgaria)

16 November 1977 1978 FIFA World Cup qualification Group 2	England	2–0	Italy	London, England
19:45 GMT (UTC±00:00)	Keegan 11'; Brooking 80'	Report		Stadium: Wembley Stadium; Attendance: 92,500; Referee: Károly Palotai (Hungary)

3 December 1977 1978 FIFA World Cup qualification Group 2	Italy	3–0	Luxembourg	Rome, Italy
14:30 CET (UTC+01:00)	Bettega 4'; Graziani 11'; Causio 56'	Report		Stadium: Stadio Olimpico; Attendance: 80,000; Referee: Dušan Maksimović (Yugoslavia)

21 October 1977 International friendly	Belgium	0–1	Italy	Liège, Belgium
20:00 CET (UTC+01:00)		Report	Antognoni 73'	Stadium: Stade Maurice Dufrasne; Attendance: 10,000; Referee: Rudolf Frickel (West Germany)

=== 1978 ===
25 January 1978 International friendly	Spain	2–1	Italy	Madrid, Spain
21:00 CET (UTC+01:00)	Pirri 10' (pen.); Dani 56'	Report	Tardelli 83'	Stadium: Santiago Bernabéu Stadium; Attendance: 10,000; Referee: Robert Wurtz (France)

8 February 1978 International friendly	Italy	2–2	France	Naples, Italy
15:00 CET (UTC+01:00)	Graziani 13' (pen.), 22'	Report	Bathenay 51'; Platini 81'	Stadium: Stadio San Paolo; Attendance: 80,000; Referee: Angel Franco Martínez (Spain)

18 May 1978 International friendly	Italy	0–0	Yugoslavia	Rome, Italy
19:00 CET (UTC+01:00)		Report		Stadium: Stadio Olimpico; Attendance: 40,000; Referee: Jean Dubach (Switzerland)

2 June 1978 1978 FIFA World Cup; Group 1	Italy	2–1	France	Mar del Plata, Argentina
13:45 ART (UTC−03:00)	Rossi 29'; Zaccarelli 54'	Report	Lacombe 1'	Stadium: Estadio José María Minella; Attendance: 42,373; Referee: Nicolae Rainea (Romania)

6 June 1978 1978 FIFA World Cup; Group 1	Italy	3–1	Hungary	Mar del Plata, Argentina
13:45 ART (UTC−03:00)	Rossi 34'; Bettega 36'; Benetti 60'	Report	A. Tóth 81' (pen.)	Stadium: Estadio José María Minella; Attendance: 26,533; Referee: Ramón Barreto (Uruguay)

10 June 1978 1978 FIFA World Cup; Group 1	Argentina	0–1	Italy	Buenos Aires, Argentina
19:15 ART (UTC−03:00)		Report	Bettega 67'	Stadium: Estadio Monumental; Attendance: 71,712; Referee: Abraham Klein (Israel)

14 June 1978 1978 FIFA World Cup; Second round – Group A	Italy	0–0	West Germany	Buenos Aires, Argentina
13:45 ART (UTC−03:00)		Report		Stadium: Estadio Monumental; Attendance: 67,547; Referee: Dušan Maksimović (Yugoslavia)

18 June 1978 1978 FIFA World Cup; Second round – Group A	Italy	1–0	Austria	Buenos Aires, Argentina
16:45 ART (UTC−03:00)	Rossi 13'	Report		Stadium: Estadio Monumental; Attendance: 66,695; Referee: Francis Rion (Belgium)

21 June 1978 1978 FIFA World Cup; Second round – Group A	Italy	1–2	Netherlands	Buenos Aires, Argentina
13:45 ART (UTC−03:00)	Brandts 19' (o.g.)	Report	Brandts 49'; Haan 76'	Stadium: Estadio Monumental; Attendance: 67,433; Referee: Angel Franco Martínez (Spain)

24 June 1978 1978 FIFA World Cup; Third place play-off	Brazil	2–1	Italy	Buenos Aires, Argentina
15:00 ART (UTC−03:00)	Nelinho 64'; Dirceu 71'	Report	Causio 38'	Stadium: Estadio Monumental; Attendance: 69,659; Referee: Abraham Klein (Israel)

20 September 1978 International friendly	Italy	1–0	Bulgaria	Turin, Italy
19:30 CEST (UTC+02:00)	Cabrini 62'	Report		Stadium: Stadio Comunale; Attendance: 30,000; Referee: Erich Linemayr (Austria)

23 September 1978 International friendly	Italy	1–0	Turkey	Florence, Italy
16:30 CEST (UTC+02:00)	Graziani 26'	Report		Stadium: Stadio Comunale; Attendance: 40,000; Referee: António Garrido (Portugal)

8 November 1978 International friendly	Czechoslovakia	3–0	Italy	Bratislava, Czechoslovakia
17:00 CET (UTC+01:00)	Jarůšek 1'; Panenka 53'; Masný 87' (pen.)	Report		Stadium: Tehelné pole Attendance: 55,000; Referee: Franz Wöhrer (Austria)

21 December 1978 International friendly	Italy	1–0	Spain	Rome, Italy
14:30 CET (UTC+01:00)	Rossi 31'	Report		Stadium: Stadio Olimpico; Attendance: 35,000; Referee: Nikola Dudin (Bulgaria)

=== 1979 ===
24 February 1979 International friendly	Italy	3–0	Netherlands	Milan, Italy
15:00 CET (UTC+01:00)	Bettega 9'; Rossi 19'; Tardelli 44'	Report		Stadium: San Siro; Attendance: 70,000; Referee: Nicolae Rainea (Romania)

26 May 1979 International friendly	Italy	2–2	Argentina	Rome, Italy
19:15 CEST (UTC+02:00)	Causio 25'; Rossi 55'	Report	Valencia 7'; Passarella 56' (pen.)	Stadium: Stadio Olimpico; Attendance: 65,000; Referee: Porém Luís Porém Luís (Portugal)

13 June 1979 International friendly	Yugoslavia	4–1	Italy	Zagreb, Yugoslavia
18:00 CET (UTC+01:00)	Sušić 28', 36', 66'; Zajec 86'	Report	Rossi 25'	Stadium: Stadion Maksimir; Attendance: 20,000; Referee: Walter Eschweiler (West Germany)

26 September 1979 International friendly	Italy	1–0	Sweden	Florence, Italy
20:15 CEST (UTC+02:00)	Oriali 15'	Report		Stadium: Stadio Comunale; Attendance: 40,000; Referee: André Daina (Switzerland)

17 November 1979 International friendly	Italy	2–0	Switzerland	Udine, Italy
14:30 CET (UTC+01:00)	Graziani 25'; Tardelli 40'	Report		Stadium: Stadio Friuli; Attendance: 35,000; Referee: Ulf Eriksson (Sweden)

=== 1980 ===
16 February 1980 International friendly	Italy	2–1	Romania	Naples, Italy
15:00 CET (UTC+01:00)	Collovati 56'; Causio 87'	Report	Bölöni 52'	Stadium: Stadio San Paolo; Attendance: 45,000; Referee: Charles Corver (Netherlands)

15 March 1980 International friendly	Italy	1–0	Uruguay	Milan, Italy
15:00 CET (UTC+01:00)	Graziani 9'	Report		Stadium: San Siro; Attendance: 35,000; Referee: Ivan Yosifov (Bulgaria)

19 April 1980 International friendly	Italy	2–2	Poland	Turin, Italy
16:30 CEST (UTC+02:00)	Causio 1'; Scirea 24'	Report	Sybis 9'; Szarmach 35' (pen.)	Stadium: Stadio Comunale; Attendance: 50,000; Referee: Clive White (England)

12 June 1980 UEFA Euro 1980; Group 2	Spain	0–0	Italy	Milan, Italy
20:30 CEST (UTC+02:00)		Report		Stadium: San Siro; Attendance: 46,816; Referee: Károly Palotai (Hungary)

15 June 1980 UEFA Euro 1980; Group 2	England	0–1	Italy	Turin, Italy
20:30 CEST (UTC+02:00)		Report	Tardelli 79'	Stadium: Stadio Comunale; Attendance: 59,646; Referee: Nicolae Rainea (Romania)

18 June 1980 UEFA Euro 1980; Group 2	Italy	0–0	Belgium	Rome, Italy
20:30 CEST (UTC+02:00)		Report		Stadium: Stadio Olimpico; Attendance: 42,318; Referee: António Garrido (Portugal)

21 June 1980 UEFA Euro 1980; Third place match	Czechoslovakia	1–1 (a.e.t.) (9–8 p)	Italy	Rome, Italy
20:30 CEST (UTC+02:00)	Jurkemik 54'	Report	Graziani 73'	Stadium: Stadio Olimpico; Attendance: 24,652; Referee: Erich Linemayr (Austria)
	Penalties
	Masný (penalty scored); Nehoda (penalty scored); Ondruš (penalty scored); Jurkemik (penalty scored); Panenka (penalty scored); Gögh (penalty scored); Gajdůšek (penalty scored); Kozák (penalty scored); Barmoš (penalty scored)		(penalty scored) Causio; (penalty scored) Altobelli; (penalty scored) Baresi; (penalty scored) Cabrini; (penalty scored) Benetti; (penalty scored) Graziani; (penalty scored) Scirea; (penalty scored) Tardelli; (penalty missed) Collovati

24 September 1980 International friendly	Italy	3–1	Portugal	Genoa, Italy
20:30 CEST (UTC+02:00)	Altobelli 63', 80'; Graziani 88'	Report		Stadium: Stadio Luigi Ferraris; Attendance: 30,000; Referee: Franz Wöhrer (Austria)

11 October 1980 1982 FIFA World Cup qualification Group 5	Luxembourg	0–2	Italy	Luxembourg City, Luxembourg
15:00 CET (UTC+01:00)		Report	Collovati 33'; Bettega 77'	Stadium: Stade Municipal; Attendance: 10,000; Referee: Henk Weerink (Netherlands)

1 November 1980 1982 FIFA World Cup qualification Group 5	Italy	2–0	Denmark	Rome, Italy
14:30 CET (UTC+01:00)	Graziani 7', 51'	Report		Stadium: Stadio Olimpico; Attendance: 49,400; Referee: Belaïd Lacarne (Algeria)

15 November 1980 1982 FIFA World Cup qualification Group 5	Italy	2–0	Yugoslavia	Turin, Italy
14:30 CET (UTC+01:00)	Cabrini 40' (pen.); Conti 75'	Report		Stadium: Stadio Comunale; Attendance: 50,677; Referee: Abraham Klein (Israel)

6 December 1980 1982 FIFA World Cup qualification Group 5	Greece	0–2	Italy	Athens, Greece
14:30 EET (UTC+02:00)		Report	Antognoni 10'; Scirea 81'	Stadium: Leoforos Alexandras Stadium; Attendance: 25,000; Referee: Michel Vautrot (France)

=== 1981 ===
3 January 1981 1980 Mundialito; Group A	Uruguay	2–0	Italy	Montevideo, Uruguay
18:00 UYT (UTC−03:00)	Julio Morales 67' (pen.); Victorino 81'	Report		Stadium: Estadio Centenario; Attendance: 55,000; Referee: Emilio Guruceta (Spain)

6 January 1981 1980 Mundialito; Group A	Italy	1–1	Netherlands	Montevideo, Uruguay
18:00 UYT (UTC−03:00)	Ancelotti 7'	Report	Jan Peters 15'	Stadium: Estadio Centenario; Attendance: 15,000; Referee: Franz Wöhrer (Austria)

25 February 1981 International friendly	Italy	0–3	Europe XI	Rome, Italy
20:30 CET (UTC+01:00)		Report	Simonsen 32'; Halilhodžić 56'; Woodcock 79'	Stadium: Stadio Olimpico; Attendance: 12,000; Referee: Erich Linemayr (Austria)

19 April 1981 International friendly	Italy	0–0	East Germany	Udine, Italy
16:00 CEST (UTC+02:00)		Report		Stadium: Stadio Friuli; Attendance: 22,000; Referee: John Hunting (England)

3 June 1981 1982 FIFA World Cup qualification Group 5	Denmark	3–1	Italy	Copenhagen, Denmark
19:30 CEST (UTC+02:00)	Røntved 59'; Arnesen 61'; Bastrup 87'	Report	Graziani 69'	Stadium: Idrætsparken; Attendance: 36,300; Referee: Franz Wöhrer (Austria)

23 September 1981 International friendly	Italy	3–2	Bulgaria	Bologna, Italy
20:30 CEST (UTC+02:00)	Graziani 39', 58'; Dossena 75'	Report	Mladenov 84'; Dossena 89' (o.g.)	Stadium: Stadio Comunale; Attendance: 30,000; Referee: Augusto Lamo Castillo (Spain)

17 October 1981 1982 FIFA World Cup qualification Group 5	Yugoslavia	1–1	Italy	Belgrade, Yugoslavia
16:00 CET (UTC+01:00)	Zl. Vujović 9'	Report	Bettega 33'	Stadium: FK Crvena Zvezda Stadium; Attendance: 70,000; Referee: Walter Eschweiler (West Germany)

14 November 1981 1982 FIFA World Cup qualification Group 5	Italy	1–1	Greece	Turin, Italy
14:30 CET (UTC+01:00)	Conti 61'	Report	Kouis 87'	Stadium: Stadio Comunale; Attendance: 39,670; Referee: Nicolae Rainea (Romania)

5 December 1981 1982 FIFA World Cup qualification Group 5	Italy	1–0	Luxembourg	Naples, Italy
14:30 CET (UTC+01:00)	Collovati 7'	Report		Stadium: Stadio San Paolo; Attendance: 49,247; Referee: Velichko Tsonchev (Bulgaria)

=== 1982 ===
23 February 1982 International friendly	France	2–0	Italy	Paris, France
20:30 CET (UTC+01:00)	Platini 19'; Bravo 84'	Report		Stadium: Parc des Princes; Attendance: 46,000; Referee: Walter Eschweiler (West Germany)

14 April 1982 International friendly	East Germany	1–0	Italy	Leipzig, East Germany
17:00 CEST (UTC+02:00)	Hause 20'	Report		Stadium: Zentralstadion; Attendance: 25,000; Referee: Dušan Krchňák (Czechoslovakia)

28 May 1982 International friendly	Switzerland	1–1	Italy	Geneva, Switzerland
20:30 CEST (UTC+02:00)	Barberis 50'	Report	Cabrini 79'	Stadium: Charmilles Stadium; Attendance: 27,100; Referee: Adolf Mathias (Austria)

14 June 1982 1982 FIFA World Cup; Group 1	Italy	0–0	Poland	Vigo, Spain
17:15 CEST (UTC+02:00)		Report		Stadium: Balaídos; Attendance: 33,040; Referee: Michel Vautrot (France)

18 June 1982 1982 FIFA World Cup; Group 1	Italy	1–1	Peru	Vigo, Spain
17:15 CEST (UTC+02:00)	Conti 18'	Report	Díaz 83'	Stadium: Balaídos; Attendance: 25,000; Referee: Walter Eschweiler (West Germany)

23 June 1982 1982 FIFA World Cup; Group 1	Italy	1–1	Cameroon	Vigo, Spain
17:15 CEST (UTC+02:00)	Graziani 60'	Report	M'Bida 61'	Stadium: Balaídos; Attendance: 20,000; Referee: Bogdan Dotchev (Bulgaria)

29 June 1982 1982 FIFA World Cup; Second round – Group C	Italy	2–1	Argentina	Barcelona, Spain
17:15 CEST (UTC+02:00)	Tardelli 57'; Cabrini 67'	Report	Passarella 83'	Stadium: Estadio Sarriá; Attendance: 43,000; Referee: Nicolae Rainea (Romania)

5 July 1982 1982 FIFA World Cup; Second round – Group C	Italy	3–2	Brazil	Barcelona, Spain
17:15 CEST (UTC+02:00)	Rossi 5', 25', 74'	Report	Sócrates 12'; Falcão 68'	Stadium: Estadio Sarriá; Attendance: 44,000; Referee: Abraham Klein (Israel)

8 July 1982 1982 FIFA World Cup; Semi-final	Poland	0–2	Italy	Barcelona, Spain
17:15 CEST (UTC+02:00)		Report	Rossi 22', 73'	Stadium: Camp Nou; Attendance: 50,000; Referee: Juan Daniel Cardellino (Uruguay)

11 July 1982 1982 FIFA World Cup; Final	Italy	3–1	West Germany	Madrid, Spain
20:00 CEST (UTC+02:00)	Rossi 57'; Tardelli 69'; Altobelli 81'	Report	Breitner 83'	Stadium: Santiago Bernabéu Stadium; Attendance: 90,000; Referee: Arnaldo Cézar Coelho (Brazil)

27 October 1982 International friendly	Italy	0–1	Switzerland	Rome, Italy
20:30 CET (UTC+01:00)		Report	Elsener 53'	Stadium: Stadio Olimpico; Attendance: 50,000; Referee: Arnaldo Cézar Coelho (Brazil)

13 November 1982 UEFA Euro 1984 qualifying Group 5	Italy	2–2	Czechoslovakia	Milan, Italy
14:30 CET (UTC+01:00)	Altobelli 13'; Kapko 65' (o.g.)	Report	Sloup 26'; Chaloupka 70'	Stadium: San Siro; Attendance: 72,386; Referee: Charles Corver (Netherlands)

4 December 1982 UEFA Euro 1984 qualifying Group 5	Italy	0–0	Romania	Florence, Italy
14:30 CET (UTC+01:00)		Report		Stadium: Stadio Comunale; Attendance: 50,478; Referee: Georges Konrath (France)

=== 1983 ===
12 February 1983 UEFA Euro 1984 qualifying Group 5	Cyprus	1–1	Italy	Limassol, Cyprus
15:30 EET (UTC+02:00)	Omirou 47'	Report	Graziani 58'	Stadium: Tsirion Stadium; Attendance: 22,000; Referee: Bogdan Dotchev (Bulgaria)

16 April 1983 UEFA Euro 1984 qualifying Group 5	Romania	1–0	Italy	Bucharest, Romania
20:00 EEST (UTC+03:00)	Bölöni 24'	Report		Stadium: 23 August Stadium; Attendance: 80,000; Referee: Michel Vautrot (France)

29 May 1983 UEFA Euro 1984 qualifying Group 5	Sweden	2–0	Italy	Gothenburg, Sweden
18:00 CEST (UTC+02:00)	Eriksson 31'; Corneliusson 55'	Report		Stadium: Nya Ullevi; Attendance: 32,860; Referee: Walter Eschweiler (West Germany)

5 October 1983 International friendly	Italy	3–0	Greece	Bari, Italy
20:30 CET (UTC+01:00)	Giordano 15'; Cabrini 23'; Rossi 36'	Report		Stadium: Stadio Comunale; Attendance: 40,000; Referee: Horst Brummeier (Austria)

15 October 1983 UEFA Euro 1984 qualifying Group 5	Italy	0–3	Sweden	Naples, Italy
15:00 CET (UTC+01:00)		Report	Strömberg 20', 27'; Sunesson 71'	Stadium: Stadio San Paolo; Attendance: 60,086; Referee: José García Carrión (Spain)

16 November 1983 UEFA Euro 1984 qualifying Group 5	Czechoslovakia	2–0	Italy	Prague, Czechoslovakia
17:00 CET (UTC+01:00)	Rada 63', 76' (pen.)	Report		Stadium: Stadion Evžena Rošického; Attendance: 25,000; Referee: George Courtney (England)

22 December 1983 UEFA Euro 1984 qualifying Group 5	Italy	3–1	Cyprus	Perugia, Italy
17:00 CET (UTC+01:00)	Altobelli 53'; Cabrini 82'; Rossi 86' (pen.)	Report	Tsingis 68' (pen.)	Stadium: Stadio Renato Curi; Attendance: 20,773; Referee: Thomas Oliver Donnelly (Northern Ireland)

=== 1984 ===
4 February 1984 International friendly	Italy	5–0	Mexico	Rome, Italy
15:00 CET (UTC+01:00)	Bagni 1'; Rossi 12', 37', 44'; Conti 50'	Report		Stadium: Stadio Olimpico; Attendance: 45,000; Referee: Viriato Graça Oliva (Portugal)

3 March 1984 International friendly	Turkey	1–2	Italy	Istanbul, Turkey
15:00 TRT (UTC+03:00)	Tüfekçi 65'	Report	Altobelli 2'; Cabrini 18'	Stadium: BJK İnönü Stadium; Attendance: 40,000; Referee: Radu Petrescu (Romania)

7 April 1984 International friendly	Italy	1–1	Czechoslovakia	Verona, Italy
18:30 CEST (UTC+02:00)	Bagni 33'	Report	Griga 67'	Stadium: Stadio Marc'Antonio Bentegodi; Attendance: 40,000; Referee: Alexis Ponnet (Belgium)

22 May 1984 International friendly	West Germany	1–0	Italy	Zürich, Switzerland
20:10 CEST (UTC+02:00)	Briegel 61'	Report		Stadium: Letzigrund; Attendance: 26,000; Referee: Arnaldo Cézar Coelho (Brazil)

26 May 1984 International friendly	Canada	0–2	Italy	Toronto, Canada
15:00 EDT (UTC−04:00)		Report	Altobelli 31'; Battistini 85'	Stadium: Varsity Stadium; Attendance: 15,000; Referee: Ulrich Nyffenegger (Switzerland)

30 May 1984 International friendly	United States	0–0	Italy	East Rutherford, United States
21:00 EDT (UTC−04:00)		Report		Stadium: Giants Stadium; Attendance: 35,000; Referee: Marco Dorantes (Mexico)

26 September 1984 International friendly	Italy	1–0	Sweden	Milan, Italy
20:40 CEST (UTC+02:00)	Cabrini 2'	Report		Stadium: San Siro; Attendance: 25,000; Referee: Horst Brummeier (Austria)

3 November 1984 International friendly	Switzerland	1–1	Italy	Lausanne, Switzerland
19:30 CET (UTC+01:00)	Bregy 43'	Report	Cabrini 7'	Stadium: Stade Olympique de la Pontaise; Attendance: 20,000; Referee: Tony Evangelista (Canada)

8 December 1984 International friendly	Italy	2–0	Poland	Pescara, Italy
14:30 CET (UTC+01:00)	Altobelli 77'; Di Gennaro 90'	Report		Stadium: Stadio Adriatico; Attendance: 40,000; Referee: Bob Valentine (Scotland)

=== 1985 ===
5 February 1985 International friendly	Republic of Ireland	1–2	Italy	Dublin, Republic of Ireland
19:45 GMT (UTC±00:00)	Waddock 53'	Report	Rossi 5' (pen.); Altobelli 18'	Stadium: Dalymount Park; Attendance: 40,000; Referee: Jan Keizer (Netherlands)

13 March 1985 International friendly	Greece	0–0	Italy	Athens, Greece
16:30 EET (UTC+02:00)		Report		Stadium: Olympic Stadium; Attendance: 8,000; Referee: Németh Lajos (Hungary)

3 April 1985 International friendly	Italy	2–0	Portugal	Ascoli Piceno, Italy
20:30 WEST (UTC+01:00)	Conti 40'; Rossi 78' (pen.)	Report		Stadium: Stadio Cino e Lillo Del Duca; Attendance: 40,000; Referee: George Courtney (England)

2 June 1985 1985 Ciudad de México Cup Tournament	Mexico	1–1	Italy	Mexico City, Mexico
12:00 CST (UTC−06:00)	Aguirre 45'	Report	Di Gennaro 54'	Stadium: Estadio Azteca; Attendance: 35,000; Referee: John Meachin (Canada)

6 June 1985 1985 Ciudad de México Cup Tournament	Italy	2–1	England	Mexico City, Mexico
14:00 CST (UTC−06:00)	Bagni 73'; Altobelli 89' (pen.)	Report	Hateley 74'	Stadium: Estadio Azteca; Attendance: 7,000; Referee: Antonio Márquez Ramírez (Mexico)

25 September 1985 International friendly	Italy	1–2	Norway	Lecce, Italy
20:30 CEST (UTC+02:00)	Altobelli 26'	Report	Økland 39'; Davidsen 42'	Stadium: Stadio Via del Mare; Attendance: 50,000; Referee: Werner Föckler (West Germany)

16 November 1985 International friendly	Poland	1–0	Italy	Chorzów, Poland
17:00 CET (UTC+01:00)	Dziekanowski 5'	Report		Stadium: Silesian Stadium; Attendance: 10,000; Referee: Bogdan Dochev (Bulgaria)

=== 1986 ===
5 February 1986 International friendly	Italy	1–2	West Germany	Avellino, Italy
14:30 CET (UTC+01:00)	Serena 21'	Report	Herget 37'; Matthäus 75' (pen.)	Stadium: Stadio Partenio; Attendance: 40,000; Referee: Ioan Igna (Romania)

26 March 1986 International friendly	Italy	2–1	Austria	Udine, Italy
20:00 CET (UTC+01:00)	Altobelli 55'; Di Gennaro 76'	Report	Polster 3'	Stadium: Stadio Friuli; Attendance: 35,000; Referee: Victoriano Sánchez Arminio (Spain)

11 May 1986 International friendly	Italy	2–0	China	Naples, Italy
19:00 CEST (UTC+02:00)	Di Gennaro 23'; Altobelli 33'	Report		Stadium: Stadio San Paolo; Attendance: 60,000; Referee: José Rosa dos Santos (Portugal)

31 May 1986 1986 FIFA World Cup; Group A	Bulgaria	1–1	Italy	Mexico City, Mexico
12:00 CST (UTC−06:00)	Sirakov 85'	Report	Altobelli 43'	Stadium: Estadio Azteca; Attendance: 96,000; Referee: Erik Fredriksson (Sweden)

5 June 1986 1986 FIFA World Cup; Group A	Italy	1–1	Argentina	Puebla City, Mexico
12:00 CST (UTC−06:00)	Altobelli 6' (pen.)	Report	Maradona 34'	Stadium: Estadio Cuauhtémoc; Attendance: 32,000; Referee: Jan Keizer (Netherlands)

10 June 1986 1986 FIFA World Cup; Group A	South Korea	2–3	Italy	Puebla City, Mexico
12:00 CST (UTC−06:00)	Choi Soon-ho 62'; Huh Jung-moo 83'	Report	Altobelli 17', 73'; Cho Kwang-rae 82' (o.g.)	Stadium: Estadio Cuauhtémoc; Attendance: 20,000; Referee: David Socha (United States)

17 June 1986 1986 FIFA World Cup; Round of 16	Italy	0–2	France	Mexico City, Mexico
12:00 CST (UTC−06:00)		Report	Platini 15'; Stopyra 57'	Stadium: Estadio Olímpico Universitario; Attendance: 70,000; Referee: Carlos Espósito (Argentina)

8 October 1986^{1} International friendly	Italy	2–0	Greece	Bologna, Italy
20:30 CET (UTC+01:00)	Bergomi 8', 68'	Report		Stadium: Stadio Renato Dall'Ara; Attendance: 45,000; Referee: Renzo Peduzzi (Switzerland)

15 November 1986 UEFA Euro 1988 qualifying Group 2	Italy	3–2	Switzerland	Milan, Italy
14:30 CET (UTC+01:00)	Donadoni 1'; Altobelli 52', 85'	Report	Brigger 31'; Weber 88'	Stadium: San Siro; Attendance: 67,422; Referee: Aron Schmidhuber (West Germany)

6 December 1986 UEFA Euro 1988 qualifying Group 2	Malta	0–2	Italy	Ta' Qali, Malta
14:15 CET (UTC+01:00)		Report	Ferri 12'; Altobelli 19'	Stadium: Ta' Qali National Stadium; Attendance: 13,191; Referee: Ihsan Türe (Turkey)

=== 1987 ===
24 January 1987 UEFA Euro 1988 qualifying Group 2	Italy	5–0	Malta	Bergamo, Italy
14:30 CET (UTC+01:00)	Bagni 4'; Bergomi 9'; Altobelli 24', 35'; Vialli 45'	Report		Stadium: Stadio Atleti Azzurri d'Italia; Attendance: 32,370; Referee: Stephanos Hadjistefanou (Cyprus)

14 February 1987 UEFA Euro 1988 qualifying Group 2	Portugal	0–1	Italy	Lisbon, Portugal
15:30 WET (UTC±00:00)		Report	Altobelli 40'	Stadium: Estádio Nacional; Attendance: 14,195; Referee: Michel Vautrot (France)

18 April 1987 International friendly	West Germany	0–0	Italy	Cologne, West Germany
18:00 CEST (UTC+02:00)		Report		Stadium: Müngersdorfer Stadium; Attendance: 55,000; Referee: Albert Thomas (Netherlands)

28 May 1987 International friendly	Norway	0–0	Italy	Oslo, Norway
19:00 CEST (UTC+02:00)		Report		Stadium: Ullevaal Stadion; Attendance: 12,000; Referee: Keith Hackett (England)

3 June 1987 UEFA Euro 1988 qualifying Group 2	Sweden	1–0	Italy	Solna, Sweden
19:00 CEST (UTC+02:00)	Larsson 25'	Report		Stadium: Råsunda Stadium; Attendance: 40,070; Referee: Dieter Pauly (West Germany)

10 June 1987 International friendly	Italy	3–1	Argentina	Zürich, Switzerland
20:30 CEST (UTC+02:00)	De Napoli 27'; Garré 33' (o.g.); Vialli 88'	Report	Maradona 62'	Stadium: Hardturm; Attendance: 30,000; Referee: Joël Quiniou (France)

23 September 1987 International friendly	Italy	1–0	Yugoslavia	Pisa, Italy
20:30 CEST (UTC+02:00)	Altobelli 23'	Report		Stadium: Arena Garibaldi; Attendance: 25,000; Referee: Emilio Soriano Aladrén (Spain)

17 October 1987 UEFA Euro 1988 qualifying Group 2	Switzerland	0–0	Italy	Bern, Switzerland
17:00 CET (UTC+01:00)		Report		Stadium: Wankdorf Stadium; Attendance: 29,397; Referee: Marcel Van Langenhove (Belgium)

14 November 1987 UEFA Euro 1988 qualifying Group 2	Italy	2–1	Sweden	Naples, Italy
14:30 CET (UTC+01:00)	Vialli 27', 47'	Report	Larsson 38'	Stadium: Stadio San Paolo; Attendance: 59,046; Referee: Adolf Prokop (East Germany)

5 December 1987 UEFA Euro 1988 qualifying Group 2	Italy	3–0	Portugal	Milan, Italy
14:30 CET (UTC+01:00)	Vialli 8'; Giannini 87'; De Agostini 89'	Report		Stadium: San Siro; Attendance: 13,524; Referee: Johannes Keizer (Netherlands)

=== 1988 ===
20 February 1988 International friendly	Italy	4–1	Soviet Union	Bari, Italy
15:00 CET (UTC+01:00)	Baresi 7' (pen.); Vialli 30', 35'; Bergomi 86'	Report	Lytovchenko 19'	Stadium: Stadio della Vittoria; Attendance: 27,636; Referee: Yusuf Namoğlu (Turkey)

31 March 1988 International friendly	Yugoslavia	1–1	Italy	Split, Yugoslavia
19:00 CEST (UTC+02:00)	Jakovljević 45'	Report	Vialli 10'	Stadium: Stadion Poljud; Attendance: 12,000; Referee: Helmut Kohl (Austria)

27 April 1988 International friendly	Luxembourg	0–3	Italy	Luxembourg City, Luxembourg
20:15 CEST (UTC+02:00)		Report	Ferri 24'; Bergomi 28'; De Agostini 33'	Stadium: Stade Municipal; Attendance: 5,480; Referee: Jacob van der Niet (Netherlands)

4 June 1988 International friendly	Italy	0–1	Wales	Brescia, Italy
20:15 CEST (UTC+02:00)		Report	Rush 38'	Stadium: Stadio Mario Rigamonti; Attendance: 18,931; Referee: Karl-Heinz Tritschler (West Germany)

10 June 1988 UEFA Euro 1988; Group A	West Germany	1–1	Italy	Düsseldorf, West Germany
20:15 CEST (UTC+02:00)	Brehme 55'	Report	Mancini 52'	Stadium: Rheinstadion; Attendance: 62,552; Referee: Keith Hackett (England)

14 June 1988 UEFA Euro 1988; Group A	Italy	1–0	Spain	Frankfurt, West Germany
20:15 CEST (UTC+02:00)	Vialli 73'	Report		Stadium: Waldstadion; Attendance: 47,506; Referee: Erik Fredriksson (Sweden)

17 June 1988 UEFA Euro 1988; Group A	Italy	2–0	Denmark	Cologne, West Germany
20:15 CEST (UTC+02:00)	Altobelli 67'; De Agostini 87'	Report		Stadium: Müngersdorfer Stadion; Attendance: 53,951; Referee: Bruno Galler (Switzerland)

22 June 1988 UEFA Euro 1988; Semi-final	Soviet Union	2–0	Italy	Stuttgart, West Germany
20:15 CEST (UTC+02:00)	Lytovchenko 58'; Protasov 62'	Report		Stadium: Neckarstadion; Attendance: 61,606; Referee: Alexis Ponnet (Belgium)

19 October 1988 International friendly	Italy	2–1	Norway	Pescara, Italy
20:30 CET (UTC+01:00)	Giannini 18' (pen.); Ferri 29'	Report	Brandhaug 40' (pen.)	Stadium: Stadio Adriatico; Attendance: 10,834; Referee: Makis Germanakos (Greece)

16 November 1988 International friendly	Italy	1–0	Netherlands	Rome, Italy
14:30 CET (UTC+01:00)	Vialli 44'	Report		Stadium: Stadio Olimpico; Attendance: 27,878; Referee: Emilio Soriano Aladrén (Spain)

22 December 1988 International friendly	Italy	2–0	Scotland	Perugia, Italy
14:30 CET (UTC+01:00)	Giannini 48'; Berti 70'	Report		Stadium: Stadio Renato Curi; Attendance: 25,600; Referee: Alain Delmer (France)

=== 1989 ===
22 February 1989 International friendly	Italy	1–0	Denmark	Pisa, Italy
19:00 CET (UTC+01:00)	Bergomi 61'	Report		Stadium: Arena Garibaldi; Attendance: 20,366; Referee: Horst Brummeier (Austria)

25 March 1989 International friendly	Austria	0–1	Italy	Vienna, Austria
16:30 CET (UTC+01:00)		Report	Berti 88'	Stadium: Praterstadion; Attendance: 23,000; Referee: Manfred Neuner (West Germany)

29 March 1989 International friendly	Romania	1–0	Italy	Sibiu, Romania
17:00 EEST (UTC+03:00)	Sabău 48'	Report		Stadium: Stadionul Municipal; Attendance: 20,000; Referee: Siegfried Kirschen (East Germany)

22 April 1989 International friendly	Italy	1–1	Uruguay	Verona, Italy
20:30 CEST (UTC+02:00)	R. Baggio 65'	Report	Carlos Aguilera 83'	Stadium: Stadio Marc'Antonio Bentegodi; Attendance: 13,891; Referee: George Courtney (England)

26 April 1989 International friendly	Italy	4–0	Hungary	Taranto, Italy
15:30 CEST (UTC+02:00)	Vialli 8'; Ferri 53'; Berti 67'; Carnevale 77'	Report		Stadium: Stadio Erasmo Iacovone; Attendance: 23,700; Referee: Kurt Röthlisberger (Switzerland)

20 September 1989 International friendly	Italy	4–0	Bulgaria	Cesena, Italy
20:15 CEST (UTC+02:00)	R. Baggio 18' (pen.), 34'; Carnevale 46'; Iliev 53' (o.g.)	Report		Stadium: Stadio Dino Manuzzi; Attendance: 22,328; Referee: Alphonse Costantin (France)

14 October 1989 International friendly	Italy	0–1	Brazil	Bologna, Italy
15:00 CET (UTC+01:00)		Report	André Cruz 77'	Stadium: Stadio Renato Dall'Ara; Attendance: 33,800; Referee: Helmut Kohl (Austria)

11 November 1989 International friendly	Italy	1–0	Algeria	Vicenza, Italy
14:30 CET (UTC+01:00)	Serena 74'	Report		Stadium: Stadio Romeo Menti; Attendance: 24,990; Referee: Zoran Petrović (Yugoslavia)

15 November 1989 International friendly	England	0–0	Italy	London, England
20:00 GMT (UTC±00:00)		Report		Stadium: Wembley Stadium; Attendance: 67,500; Referee: Hubert Forstinger (Austria)

21 December 1989 International friendly	Italy	0–0	Argentina	Cagliari, Italy
14:30 CET (UTC+01:00)		Report		Stadium: Stadio Sant'Elia; Attendance: 29,635; Referee: Alexey Spirin (Soviet Union)

^{1}Indicates new coach
