= 1965–66 in English football =

Football in England
- Season: 1965–66

Men's football
- First Division: Liverpool
- Second Division: Manchester City
- Third Division: Hull City
- Fourth Division: Doncaster Rovers
- FA Cup: Everton
- FA Amateur Cup: Wealdstone
- League Cup: West Bromwich Albion
- Charity Shield: Shared between Liverpool and Manchester United

The 1965–66 season was the 86th season of competitive football in England.

== Diary of the season ==
7 October 1965: An experiment to broadcast a live game to another ground takes place. Cardiff City play Coventry City and the match is broadcast to a crowd of 10,000 at Coventry's ground Highfield Road.

11 December 1965: Victory for Liverpool over Arsenal sees the Kopites open up a three-point gap over Burnley in second at the top of the Football League, while West Bromwich Albion – formerly in third – slide down the table after Leeds United hit them for four. Leeds are not the only beneficiaries of WBA's defeat: Tottenham Hotspur's London derby win over Chelsea and Sheffield United's point against Nottingham Forest are enough for both to go above the Albion. Leeds, Tottenham, and Sheffield United have all gained 25 points, though the South Yorkshire side have played one more match than the other two. In the third tier, Walsall forward George Kirby is attacked by pitch-invading Millwall supporters.

12 February 1966: Division Three table-toppers Hull City beat top-flight Nottingham Forest at Boothferry Park in the FA Cup fourth round. 16 April 1966: Liverpool seal the First Division title for the seventh time in their history with a 2–0 home win over Stoke City.

5 May 1966: Liverpool are beaten 2–1 (a.e.t.) by West German side Borussia Dortmund in the 1966 final of the European Cup Winners' Cup at Hampden Park, Glasgow, Scotland.

14 May 1966: Everton win the FA Cup with a 3–2 win over Sheffield Wednesday in the final at Wembley Stadium, despite going 2–0 down in the 57th minute.

== England national team ==
The 1966 FIFA World Cup was held in England in July 1966. Four months prior to the start of the tournament, the Jules Rimet Trophy, the prize for winning the FIFA World Cup, was stolen from an exhibition at Central Hall, Westminster, where it was on show in the run-up to the tournament. It was recovered a week later by Pickles, a mongrel dog, in South London.

As the host nation, England began their World Cup campaign with a goalless draw against Uruguay at Wembley Stadium. This was followed by a 2–0 win over Mexico, with Bobby Charlton and Roger Hunt scoring the goals. England qualified for the knockout stage of the competition with a 2–0 win against France in their final group game. Roger Hunt scored both of England's goals.

England beat Argentina 1–0 in the quarter-final, thanks to a goal by Geoff Hurst. In the semi-final, Bobby Charlton scored both of England's goals as they overcame Portugal by a 2–1 scoreline. Facing West Germany in the final, England won 4–2 in extra time to win the World Cup for the first time. Geoff Hurst scored a hat-trick, with Martin Peters scoring the other goal.

== Honours ==
| Competition | Winner | Runner-up |
|---|---|---|
| First Division | Liverpool (7*) | Leeds United |
| Second Division | Manchester City | Southampton |
| Third Division | Hull City | Millwall |
| Fourth Division | Doncaster Rovers | Darlington |
| FA Cup | Everton (3) | Sheffield Wednesday |
| League Cup | West Bromwich Albion (1) | West Ham United |
| Charity Shield | Manchester United and Liverpool (shared) | |
| Home Championship | England | Northern Ireland |

Notes = Number in parentheses is the times that club has won that honour. * indicates new record for competition

== Football League ==
=== First Division ===
Liverpool, FA Cup winners the previous season and league champions in 1964, won the First Division title with a six-point gap over last season's runners-up Leeds United, who finished level on points with Burnley. Manchester United, who also reached the semi-finals of the European Cup, ended their defence of the league title with a fourth-place finish. Chelsea finished fifth to maintain their standing as one of the First Division's top club sides. West Bromwich Albion finished sixth and won the League Cup.

11th placed Everton compensated for a disappointing league campaign by winning the FA Cup for the first time in the postwar era.

12th placed West Ham United perhaps had the biggest influence on the English game in 1966, with England's World Cup winning team featuring captain Bobby Moore and goalscorers Geoff Hurst and Martin Peters.

Blackburn Rovers went down in bottom place, a woeful 15 points adrift of safety. Northampton Town's brave first (and to date, only) season among the elite ended in relegation.

| Pos | Team | Pld | W | D | L | GF | GA | GAv | Pts | Qualification or relegation |
|---|---|---|---|---|---|---|---|---|---|---|
| 1 | Liverpool (C) | 42 | 26 | 9 | 7 | 79 | 34 | 2.324 | 61 | Qualification for the European Cup first round |
| 2 | Leeds United | 42 | 23 | 9 | 10 | 79 | 38 | 2.079 | 55 | Qualification for the Inter-Cities Fairs Cup second round |
| 3 | Burnley | 42 | 24 | 7 | 11 | 79 | 47 | 1.681 | 55 | Qualification for the Inter-Cities Fairs Cup first round |
| 4 | Manchester United | 42 | 18 | 15 | 9 | 84 | 59 | 1.424 | 51 | |
| 5 | Chelsea | 42 | 22 | 7 | 13 | 65 | 53 | 1.226 | 51 | |
| 6 | West Bromwich Albion | 42 | 19 | 12 | 11 | 91 | 69 | 1.319 | 50 | Qualification for the Inter-Cities Fairs Cup second round |
| 7 | Leicester City | 42 | 21 | 7 | 14 | 80 | 65 | 1.231 | 49 | |
| 8 | Tottenham Hotspur | 42 | 16 | 12 | 14 | 75 | 66 | 1.136 | 44 | |
| 9 | Sheffield United | 42 | 16 | 11 | 15 | 56 | 59 | 0.949 | 43 | |
| 10 | Stoke City | 42 | 15 | 12 | 15 | 65 | 64 | 1.016 | 42 | |
| 11 | Everton | 42 | 15 | 11 | 16 | 56 | 62 | 0.903 | 41 | Qualification for the European Cup Winners' Cup first round (Note: Everton qualified for the European Cup Winners' Cup as the 1965–66 FA Cup winners.) |
| 12 | West Ham United | 42 | 15 | 9 | 18 | 70 | 83 | 0.843 | 39 | |
| 13 | Blackpool | 42 | 14 | 9 | 19 | 55 | 65 | 0.846 | 37 | |
| 14 | Arsenal | 42 | 12 | 13 | 17 | 62 | 75 | 0.827 | 37 | |
| 15 | Newcastle United | 42 | 14 | 9 | 19 | 50 | 63 | 0.794 | 37 | |
| 16 | Aston Villa | 42 | 15 | 6 | 21 | 69 | 80 | 0.863 | 36 | |
| 17 | Sheffield Wednesday | 42 | 14 | 8 | 20 | 56 | 66 | 0.848 | 36 | |
| 18 | Nottingham Forest | 42 | 14 | 8 | 20 | 56 | 72 | 0.778 | 36 | |
| 19 | Sunderland | 42 | 14 | 8 | 20 | 51 | 72 | 0.708 | 36 | |
| 20 | Fulham | 42 | 14 | 7 | 21 | 67 | 85 | 0.788 | 35 | |
| 21 | Northampton Town (R) | 42 | 10 | 13 | 19 | 55 | 92 | 0.598 | 33 | Relegation to the Second Division |
| 22 | Blackburn Rovers (R) | 42 | 8 | 4 | 30 | 57 | 88 | 0.648 | 20 | Relegation to the Second Division |

Source: World Football
Rules for classification: 1) Points; 2) Goal average; 3) Goals scored
(C) Champions; (R) Relegated

=== Second Division ===
Manchester City's three-year exile from the top flight ended in promotion as Second Division champions, and they were joined in promotion by runners-up Southampton, who had never played in the First Division before. Coventry City missed out on a First Division debut by a single point, while Bristol City came just three points short of reclaiming the First Division place which had last been theirs in 1911.

Leyton Orient and Middlesbrough were relegated to the Third Division.

| Pos | Team | Pld | W | D | L | GF | GA | GAv | Pts | Qualification or relegation |
|---|---|---|---|---|---|---|---|---|---|---|
| 1 | Manchester City (C, P) | 42 | 22 | 15 | 5 | 76 | 44 | 1.727 | 59 | Promotion to the First Division |
| 2 | Southampton (P) | 42 | 22 | 10 | 10 | 85 | 56 | 1.518 | 54 | Promotion to the First Division |
| 3 | Coventry City | 42 | 20 | 13 | 9 | 73 | 53 | 1.377 | 53 | |
| 4 | Huddersfield Town | 42 | 19 | 13 | 10 | 62 | 36 | 1.722 | 51 | |
| 5 | Bristol City | 42 | 17 | 17 | 8 | 63 | 48 | 1.313 | 51 | |
| 6 | Wolverhampton Wanderers | 42 | 20 | 10 | 12 | 87 | 61 | 1.426 | 50 | |
| 7 | Rotherham United | 42 | 16 | 14 | 12 | 75 | 74 | 1.014 | 46 | |
| 8 | Derby County | 42 | 16 | 11 | 15 | 71 | 68 | 1.044 | 43 | |
| 9 | Bolton Wanderers | 42 | 16 | 9 | 17 | 62 | 59 | 1.051 | 41 | |
| 10 | Birmingham City | 42 | 16 | 9 | 17 | 70 | 75 | 0.933 | 41 | |
| 11 | Crystal Palace | 42 | 14 | 13 | 15 | 47 | 52 | 0.904 | 41 | |
| 12 | Portsmouth | 42 | 16 | 8 | 18 | 74 | 78 | 0.949 | 40 | |
| 13 | Norwich City | 42 | 12 | 15 | 15 | 52 | 52 | 1.000 | 39 | |
| 14 | Carlisle United | 42 | 17 | 5 | 20 | 60 | 63 | 0.952 | 39 | |
| 15 | Ipswich Town | 42 | 15 | 9 | 18 | 58 | 66 | 0.879 | 39 | |
| 16 | Charlton Athletic | 42 | 12 | 14 | 16 | 61 | 70 | 0.871 | 38 | |
| 17 | Preston North End | 42 | 11 | 15 | 16 | 62 | 70 | 0.886 | 37 | |
| 18 | Plymouth Argyle | 42 | 12 | 13 | 17 | 54 | 63 | 0.857 | 37 | |
| 19 | Bury | 42 | 14 | 7 | 21 | 62 | 76 | 0.816 | 35 | |
| 20 | Cardiff City | 42 | 12 | 10 | 20 | 71 | 91 | 0.780 | 34 | |
| 21 | Middlesbrough (R) | 42 | 10 | 13 | 19 | 58 | 86 | 0.674 | 33 | Relegation to the Third Division |
| 22 | Leyton Orient (R) | 42 | 5 | 13 | 24 | 38 | 80 | 0.475 | 23 | Relegation to the Third Division |

Rules for classification: 1) Points; 2) Goal average; 3) Goals scored
(C) Champions; (P) Promoted; (R) Relegated

=== Third Division ===
Champions Hull City and runners-up Millwall made the step upwards from the Third Division to the Second.

York City, Brentford, Exeter City and Southend United were relegated to the Fourth Division.

| Pos | Team | Pld | W | D | L | GF | GA | GAv | Pts | Promotion or relegation |
|---|---|---|---|---|---|---|---|---|---|---|
| 1 | Hull City (C, P) | 46 | 31 | 7 | 8 | 109 | 62 | 1.758 | 69 | Promotion to the Second Division |
| 2 | Millwall (P) | 46 | 27 | 11 | 8 | 76 | 43 | 1.767 | 65 | Promotion to the Second Division |
| 3 | Queens Park Rangers | 46 | 24 | 9 | 13 | 95 | 65 | 1.462 | 57 | |
| 4 | Scunthorpe United | 46 | 21 | 11 | 14 | 80 | 67 | 1.194 | 53 | |
| 5 | Workington | 46 | 19 | 14 | 13 | 67 | 57 | 1.175 | 52 | |
| 6 | Gillingham | 46 | 22 | 8 | 16 | 62 | 54 | 1.148 | 52 | |
| 7 | Swindon Town | 46 | 19 | 13 | 14 | 74 | 48 | 1.542 | 51 | |
| 8 | Reading | 46 | 19 | 13 | 14 | 70 | 63 | 1.111 | 51 | |
| 9 | Walsall | 46 | 20 | 10 | 16 | 77 | 64 | 1.203 | 50 | |
| 10 | Shrewsbury Town | 46 | 19 | 11 | 16 | 73 | 64 | 1.141 | 49 | |
| 11 | Grimsby Town | 46 | 17 | 13 | 16 | 68 | 62 | 1.097 | 47 | |
| 12 | Watford | 46 | 17 | 13 | 16 | 55 | 51 | 1.078 | 47 | |
| 13 | Peterborough United | 46 | 17 | 12 | 17 | 80 | 66 | 1.212 | 46 | |
| 14 | Oxford United | 46 | 19 | 8 | 19 | 70 | 74 | 0.946 | 46 | |
| 15 | Brighton & Hove Albion | 46 | 16 | 11 | 19 | 67 | 65 | 1.031 | 43 | |
| 16 | Bristol Rovers | 46 | 14 | 14 | 18 | 64 | 64 | 1.000 | 42 | |
| 17 | Swansea Town | 46 | 15 | 11 | 20 | 81 | 96 | 0.844 | 41 | Qualification for the European Cup Winners' Cup first round |
| 18 | Bournemouth & Boscombe Athletic | 46 | 13 | 12 | 21 | 38 | 56 | 0.679 | 38 | |
| 19 | Mansfield Town | 46 | 15 | 8 | 23 | 59 | 89 | 0.663 | 38 | |
| 20 | Oldham Athletic | 46 | 12 | 13 | 21 | 55 | 81 | 0.679 | 37 | |
| 21 | Southend United (R) | 46 | 16 | 4 | 26 | 54 | 83 | 0.651 | 36 | Relegation to the Fourth Division |
| 22 | Exeter City (R) | 46 | 12 | 11 | 23 | 53 | 79 | 0.671 | 35 | Relegation to the Fourth Division |
| 23 | Brentford (R) | 46 | 10 | 12 | 24 | 48 | 69 | 0.696 | 32 | Relegation to the Fourth Division |
| 24 | York City (R) | 46 | 9 | 9 | 28 | 53 | 106 | 0.500 | 27 | Relegation to the Fourth Division |

(C) Champions; (P) Promoted; (R) Relegated

=== Fourth Division ===
Doncaster Rovers enjoyed some much-overdue success by clinching the Fourth Division title and a place in the Third Division. Also promoted were Darlington, Torquay United and Colchester United. Bradford City had to apply for re-election to the league for the second time in four seasons - loss of their league place would have made them the first former winners of a major trophy to be voted out of the Football League.

| Pos | Team | Pld | W | D | L | GF | GA | GAv | Pts | Promotion or relegation |
|---|---|---|---|---|---|---|---|---|---|---|
| 1 | Doncaster Rovers (C, P) | 46 | 24 | 11 | 11 | 85 | 54 | 1.574 | 59 | Promotion to the Third Division |
| 2 | Darlington (P) | 46 | 25 | 9 | 12 | 72 | 53 | 1.358 | 59 | Promotion to the Third Division |
| 3 | Torquay United (P) | 46 | 24 | 10 | 12 | 72 | 49 | 1.469 | 58 | Promotion to the Third Division |
| 4 | Colchester United (P) | 46 | 23 | 10 | 13 | 70 | 47 | 1.489 | 56 | Promotion to the Third Division |
| 5 | Tranmere Rovers | 46 | 24 | 8 | 14 | 93 | 66 | 1.409 | 56 | |
| 6 | Luton Town | 46 | 24 | 8 | 14 | 90 | 70 | 1.286 | 56 | |
| 7 | Chester | 46 | 20 | 12 | 14 | 79 | 70 | 1.129 | 52 | |
| 8 | Notts County | 46 | 19 | 12 | 15 | 61 | 53 | 1.151 | 50 | |
| 9 | Newport County | 46 | 18 | 12 | 16 | 75 | 75 | 1.000 | 48 | |
| 10 | Southport | 46 | 18 | 12 | 16 | 68 | 69 | 0.986 | 48 | |
| 11 | Bradford (Park Avenue) | 46 | 21 | 5 | 20 | 102 | 92 | 1.109 | 47 | |
| 12 | Barrow | 46 | 16 | 15 | 15 | 72 | 76 | 0.947 | 47 | |
| 13 | Stockport County | 46 | 18 | 6 | 22 | 71 | 70 | 1.014 | 42 | |
| 14 | Crewe Alexandra | 46 | 16 | 9 | 21 | 61 | 63 | 0.968 | 41 | |
| 15 | Halifax Town | 46 | 15 | 11 | 20 | 67 | 75 | 0.893 | 41 | |
| 16 | Barnsley | 46 | 15 | 10 | 21 | 74 | 78 | 0.949 | 40 | |
| 17 | Aldershot | 46 | 15 | 10 | 21 | 75 | 84 | 0.893 | 40 | |
| 18 | Hartlepools United | 46 | 16 | 8 | 22 | 63 | 75 | 0.840 | 40 | |
| 19 | Port Vale | 46 | 15 | 9 | 22 | 48 | 59 | 0.814 | 39 | |
| 20 | Chesterfield | 46 | 13 | 13 | 20 | 62 | 78 | 0.795 | 39 | |
| 21 | Rochdale | 46 | 16 | 5 | 25 | 71 | 87 | 0.816 | 37 | Re-elected |
| 22 | Lincoln City | 46 | 13 | 11 | 22 | 57 | 82 | 0.695 | 37 | Re-elected |
| 23 | Bradford City | 46 | 12 | 13 | 21 | 63 | 94 | 0.670 | 37 | Re-elected |
| 24 | Wrexham | 46 | 13 | 9 | 24 | 72 | 104 | 0.692 | 35 | Re-elected |

Source: rsssf.com
(C) Champions; (P) Promoted

=== Top goalscorers ===
First Division

- Willie Irvine (Burnley) – 29 goals

Second Division

- Martin Chivers (Southampton) – 30 goals

Third Division

- Les Allen (Queens Park Rangers) – 30 goals

Fourth Division

- Kevin Hector (Bradford Park Avenue) – 44 goals
