= 1976 Miami Toros season =

Miami Toros
1976 season
- Manager: (England) Ken Furphy
- Stadium: Tamiami Field stadium at Tamiami Park
- NASL: Eastern Division: Fifth place
- Top goalscorer: League: (England) Cliff Marshall (5 goals); All: (England) Cliff Marshall (5 goals)
- Average home league attendance: 3,070
Home colors	Away colors

The 1976 Miami Toros season was the fourth season of the team, and the club's tenth season in professional soccer. This year, the team finished in fifth place of the Eastern Division and did not qualify for the North American Soccer League playoffs. At the end of the year, the club folded the team and moved to Fort Lauderdale, fielding a new team known as the Fort Lauderdale Strikers for the 1977 season.

== Regular season ==
W = Wins, L = Losses, GF = Goals For, GA = Goals Against, PT= point system

6 points for a win, 1 point for a shootout win, 0 points for a loss, 1 point for each regulation goal scored up to three per game.

=== Atlantic Conference ===
Northern Division	W	L	GF	GA	PT
Chicago Sting	15	9	52	32	132
Toronto Metros-Croatia	15	9	38	30	123
Rochester Lancers	13	11	36	32	114
Hartford Bicentennials	12	12	37	56	107
Boston Minutemen	7	17	35	64	74

Eastern Division	W	L	GF	GA	PT
Tampa Bay Rowdies	18	6	58	30	154
New York Cosmos	16	8	65	34	148
Washington Diplomats	14	10	46	38	126
Philadelphia Atoms	8	16	32	49	80
Miami Toros	6	18	29	58	63

== See also ==
1976 Miami Toros
