= Mike Trebilcock =

English footballer

Personal information
- Full name: Michael Trebilcock
- Date of birth: 29 November 1944 (age 81)
- Place of birth: Gunnislake, Cornwall, England
- Position: Winger

Youth career
- 1960–1962: Tavistock

Senior career*
Years	Team	Apps	(Gls)
1962–1965	Plymouth Argyle	71	(27)
1965–1968	Everton	11	(3)
1968–1972	Portsmouth	109	(33)
1972–1973	Torquay United	24	(10)
1973	→ Yeovil Town (loan)	4	(3)
1973–1974	Weymouth	33	(13)
1974–1976	Western Suburbs	23	(7)
Total		265	(95)
- * Club domestic league appearances and goals

Michael Trebilcock (born 29 November 1944) is an English retired professional footballer. He played primarily as a winger and is known for scoring twice in the 1966 FA Cup Final for Everton, becoming the first black player to score in an FA Cup Final. Trebilcock is described as a "black mixed heritage player" by sociologist Mark Christian, who notes that the label of first black Everton player is often wrongly given to Cliff Marshall, "due to [Trebilcock's] ambiguous black mixed heritage". Players of mixed heritage are now widely regarded as 'Black' e.g. Walter Tull and Trebilcock was acknowledged as Everton's first Black player by authors Bill Hern and David Gleave in their book Football's Black Pioneers - The Stories of the First Black Players to Represent the 92 League Clubs.

== Career ==
Trebilcock was born in Gunnislake, Cornwall. He played for non-league Tavistock before joining Plymouth Argyle in December 1962. He scored 27 times in 71 league games for the Pilgrims, leading to a £23,000 move to Everton on 31 December 1965. He made his debut a few days later against Aston Villa, but was injured and spent much of the rest of the season on the sidelines. In the meantime, Everton had been progressing through to the FA Cup final, where they would meet Sheffield Wednesday.

Despite having only played four reserve games since his injury, Trebilcock was included in the squad and surprisingly picked ahead of England international centre-forward Fred Pickering to play in the final. Wednesday took a 2–0 lead with goals from Jim McCalliog and David Ford, but within five minutes of Ford's goal, Trebilcock had scored twice to level the scores. A goal from Derek Temple sealed the win for Everton.

Even after the cup final, he struggled to establish himself in the Everton side and in January 1968, after three goals in only 11 league games for Everton, he moved to Portsmouth for a fee of £40,000. He was a regular goalscorer at Portsmouth, netting 33 times in 109 league games, before a free transfer took him to Torquay United in July 1972. He spent just one season at Plainmoor, hitting ten goals in 24 league games, leaving in June 1973 to join Weymouth on a free transfer. In March 1974 he emigrated to Sydney, Australia where he played for Western Suburbs and won the NSW Rothmans Medal in 1974.

Having got involved in coaching, he moved in the early 1990s up to Darwin, where a professional club had been established to compete in the Singapore national league. After less than two seasons the Darwin Cubs folded due to financial problems but he stayed in the area and took various jobs.

== Honours ==
Everton

- FA Cup: 1965–66
