= John Quinn (footballer) =

English footballer (1938–2020)

Personal information
- Date of birth: 30 May 1938
- Place of birth: St Helens, Lancashire, England
- Date of death: 19 September 2020
- Height: 5 ft 6 in (1.68 m)
- Positions: Full back; midfielder; forward

Youth career
- –1959: Prescot Cables

Senior career*
Years	Team	Apps	(Gls)
1959–1967	Sheffield Wednesday	174	(20)
1967–1972	Rotherham United	114	(7)
1972–1976	Halifax Town	92	(1)
Total		380	(28)
- * Club domestic league appearances and goals

John Quinn (30 May 1938 - 19 September 2020) was an English professional footballer who played for Sheffield Wednesday, Rotherham United and Halifax Town. He also played for non league Worksop Town towards the end of his playing days. Johnny's professional career was long, lasting from 1959 to 1976 during which time he made 379 league appearances. Quinn played in the half back position or defensive midfielder but he could also play at fullback and winger if needed. He was relatively short of stature, being only 5 foot 6 inches (165 cm).

== Career ==
Quinn played football in the St Helens Combination League as a teenager for Prescot Cables and signed for Sheffield Wednesday as an apprentice after leaving school. Wednesday had a top class team in late 1950s and early '60s and it was hard for the young Quinn to force his way into the first team. He made his debut as a 21-year-old on Saturday 26 September 1959 in a 2–0 home victory over Luton Town, however he only made one more appearance that season. It took four years for Quinn to become a regular in the Wednesday side, his cause not being helped by the fact that he had to do his national service during this time.

Quinn was a regular for Wednesday from the start of the 1964–65 season up to his departure from the club in November 1967 during his time at Hillsborough he played 196 matches (including cup games) and scored 25 goals. He played in the 1966 FA Cup Final defeat against Everton, wearing the number 11 shirt. Quinn moved to Second Division Rotherham United in November 1967, the team were struggling and were eventually relegated at the end of the season. He was made club captain by manager Tommy Docherty and he played him at wing half. He stayed at Rotherham until July 1972 when he moved to Halifax Town as player-coach.

He took over as caretaker manager of Halifax in September 1974 when George Mulhall resigned and was eventually handed the job on a permanent basis until February 1976 when he was replaced by Alan Ball senior. He left Halifax immediately on 2 February after making 92 appearances for the club and joined non league Worksop Town. At this time Johnny opened a sports shop on Middlewood Road, Hillsborough just 200 metres from the Sheffield Wednesday ground in conjunction with another former Wednesday player Gerry Young. The shop was a successful business for many years.

After the end of Johnny's professional football career he formed his own charity football team "Johnny Quinn's All Stars" featuring former professionals from around the South Yorkshire area such as Emlyn Hughes, Lawrie Madden, Imre Varadi and Mel Sterland. The All Stars have raised huge amounts of money for charity over the years and are still going today although Johnny Quinn announced he was pulling out as the figurehead of the All Stars in May 2006 with former Wednesday player Mel Sterland taking over. Sterland said at the time, "Johnny should get an MBE for what he's done for charities; the money raised must run into millions."

Quinn died on Saturday 19 September 2020, at the age of 82.

== Trivia ==
In 1968 during his time at Rotherham United Johnny Quinn had his own song that echoed from the Millmoor terraces. Manfred Mann's version of the song "Quinn the Eskimo (The Mighty Quinn)" was a hit in 1968 and was adopted by Rotherham supporters as a tribute to Quinn.

== Honours ==
Sheffield Wednesday

- FA Cup runner-up: 1965–66
