= 1966 FA Cup final =

- Event: 1965–66 FA Cup
Everton	Sheffield Wednesday
3	2
- Date: 14 May 1966
- Venue: Wembley Stadium, London
- Referee: Jack Taylor (Staffordshire)
- Attendance: 100,000

The 1966 FA Cup final was a football match played on 14 May 1966. It was contested by Everton and Sheffield Wednesday at Wembley. Everton were the first team since Bury in 1903 to reach an FA Cup Final without conceding a goal, while Sheffield Wednesday reached the final having played every round away.

Everton came back from 2–0 down to win 3–2 with goals by Mike Trebilcock (2) and Derek Temple. Jim McCalliog and David Ford scored the Owls' goals. Temple's winner came after an unfortunate slip by Gerry Young, when the ball squirmed under his foot, and Temple was able to run clear and slot the ball past goalkeeper Ron Springett into the corner. Everton became only the second side, after Blackpool in 1953, to come from two goals behind to win the cup without needing extra time, a feat which has not been repeated since.

John Lennon and Paul McCartney of The Beatles attended the match. Everton fan Eddie Cavanagh invaded the playing area and was pursued across the pitch by a policeman.

This result meant the FA Cup was taken back to Goodison Park for the third time and the first time for 33 years, since the team that included Dixie Dean won it in 1933.

== Route to the final ==
Everton		Round	Sheffield Wednesday	
Opposition	Score	Round	Opposition	Score
Sunderland (H)	3 – 0	3rd	Reading (A)	3 – 2
Bedford Town (A)	3 – 0	4th	Newcastle United (A)	2 – 1
Coventry City (H)	3 – 0	5th	Huddersfield Town (A)	2 – 1
Manchester City (A); Manchester City (R, H); Manchester City (R, (N)	0 – 0; 0 – 0; 2 – 0	6th	Blackburn Rovers (A)	2 – 1
Manchester United (N)	1 – 0	SF	Chelsea (N)	2 – 0
Key: (H) = Home venue; (A) = Away venue; (N) = Neutral venue; (R) = Replay.

== Match details ==
14 May 1966
15:00 BST

Everton	3–2	Sheffield Wednesday
Trebilcock 59', 64'; Temple 74'	Report	McCalliog 4'; Ford 57'

Wembley Stadium, London
Attendance: 100,000
Referee: Jack Taylor (Staffordshire)

Everton	Sheffield Wednesday

1	(England) Gordon West
2	(England) Tommy Wright
3	(England) Ray Wilson
4	(Scotland) Jimmy Gabriel
5	(England) Brian Labone (c)
6	(England) Brian Harris
7	(Scotland) Alex Scott
8	(England) Mike Trebilcock
9	(Scotland) Alex Young
10	(England) Colin Harvey
11	(England) Derek Temple
Manager:
(England) Harry Catterick

1	(England) Ron Springett
2	(England) Wilf Smith
3	(England) Don Megson (c)
4	(England) Peter Eustace
5	(England) Sam Ellis
6	(England) Gerry Young
7	(England) Graham Pugh
8	(England) John Fantham
9	(Scotland) Jim McCalliog
10	(England) David Ford
11	(England) John Quinn
Manager:
(England) Alan Brown

Match rules

- 90 minutes.
- 30 minutes of extra-time if necessary.
- Replay if scores still level.
