= 1974 FIFA World Cup qualification – UEFA Group 2 =

Group 2 consisted of four of the 32 teams entered into the European zone: Italy, Luxembourg, Switzerland, and Turkey. These four teams competed on a home-and-away basis for one of the 9.5 spots in the final tournament allocated to the European zone, with the group's winner claiming the place in the finals.

== Standings ==
| Rank | Team | Pld | W | D | L | GF | GA | GD | Pts |
|---|---|---|---|---|---|---|---|---|---|
| 1 | Italy | 6 | 4 | 2 | 0 | 12 | 0 | +12 | 10 |
| 2 | Turkey | 6 | 2 | 2 | 2 | 5 | 3 | +2 | 6 |
| 3 | Switzerland | 6 | 2 | 2 | 2 | 2 | 4 | −2 | 6 |
| 4 | Luxembourg | 6 | 1 | 0 | 5 | 2 | 14 | −12 | 2 |

== Matches ==
7 October 1972

| Luxembourg | 0–4 | Italy |
|---|---|---|
| | | Chinaglia 3'; Riva 6', 36'; Capello 62' |

Luxembourg, Luxembourg
Referee: Wurtz (France)

21 October 1972

| Switzerland | 0–0 | Italy |

Bern, Switzerland
Referee: Tschenscher (West Germany)

22 October 1972

| Luxembourg | 2–0 | Turkey |
|---|---|---|
| Dussier 14'; Braun 16' |

Luxembourg, Luxembourg
Referee: Riegg (West Germany)

10 December 1972

| Turkey | 3–0 | Luxembourg |
|---|---|---|
| Osman 6', 39'; Köksal 79' (pen.) |

Istanbul, Turkey
Referee: Bakhramov (Soviet Union)

13 January 1973

| Italy | 0–0 | Turkey |

Naples, Italy
Referee: Kruashvili (Soviet Union)

25 February 1973

| Turkey | 0–1 | Italy |
|---|---|---|
| | | Anastasi 35' |

Istanbul, Turkey
Referee: Aouissi (Algeria)

31 March 1973

| Italy | 5–0 | Luxembourg |
|---|---|---|
| Riva 18', 45', 70', 80'; Rivera 63' |

Genoa, Italy
Referee: Seoudi (Tunisia)

8 April 1973

| Luxembourg | 0–1 | Switzerland |
|---|---|---|
| | | Odermatt 20' |

Luxembourg, Luxembourg
Referee: Wöhrer (Austria)

9 May 1973

| Switzerland | 0–0 | Turkey |

Basel, Switzerland
Referee: Emsberger (Hungary)

26 September 1973

| Switzerland | 1–0 | Luxembourg |
|---|---|---|
| Blättler 2' |

Lucerne, Switzerland
Referee: Riedel (East Germany)

20 October 1973

| Italy | 2–0 | Switzerland |
|---|---|---|
| Rivera 39' (pen.); Riva 79' |

Rome, Italy
Referee: Jimenez (Spain)

18 November 1973

| Turkey | 2–0 | Switzerland |
|---|---|---|
| Mehmet Türkkan 51'; Melih 54' |

İzmir, Turkey
Referee: Davidson (Scotland)
