= Harton, South Shields =

Coordinates: 54.979°N 1.410°W

Harton
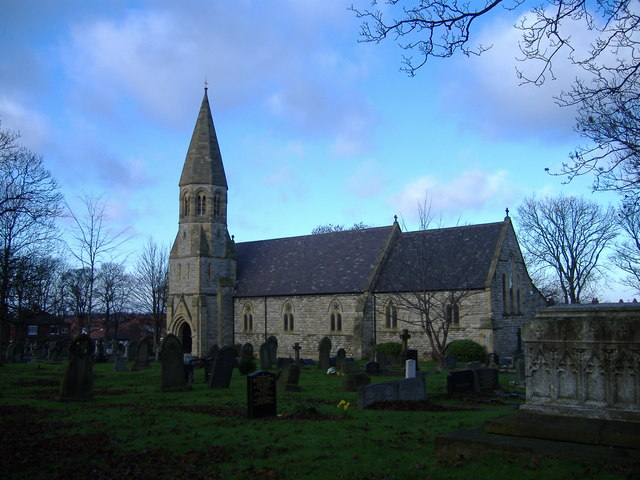
- The church of St Peter, Harton Village, 2006

- Location within Tyne and Wear
- OS grid reference: NZ 3782 6513
- Metropolitan borough: South Tyneside
- Metropolitan county: Tyne and Wear
- Region: North East
- Country: England
- Sovereign state: United Kingdom
- Post town: SOUTH SHIELDS
- Postcode district: NE34
- Dialling code: 0191
- Police: Northumbria
- Fire: Tyne and Wear
- Ambulance: North East

Harton is a suburban area of South Shields, South Tyneside, Tyne and Wear, England. It was historically a village, however as the urban area grew it merged with its adjacent villages to become part of the town. Some of the original village buildings are still intact today, such as St Peter's Church. Until 1974 it was in County Durham.

== Toponymy ==
The name Harton appears to be of Old English origin and is derived from the elements heorot ("hart, stag") + dūn ("a hill"), giving the name a meaning of "stag's hill".

== Politics ==
=== Metropolitan Borough Council ===
The electoral ward of Harton, like all wards in the borough, votes for three councillors on the South Tyneside metropolitan borough council.

=== UK Parliament ===
Harton is one of ten wards who vote for the South Shields seat in the UK Parliament, with an estimated electorate of 4098 people in the 2015 elections.

== Education ==
The area of Harton contains two schools, Harton Academy serving pupils between 11 and 18 years old, and Harton Primary School, serving pupils between ages five and 11 years.

== History ==
Harton was formerly a township and chapelry in the parish of Jarrow, in 1866 Harton became a separate civil parish, on 1 November 1921 the parish was abolished and merged with South Shields and Whitburn. In 1921 the parish had a population of 2437. It is now in the unparished area of South Shields.

=== Structures ===
The village of Harton has been built around St Peter's Church for over 150 years now, and the church is still active to this day. Other buildings of note in the village are The Vigilant Inn and The Old Ship pubs. Opposite The Vigilant, the old walls of the village are still visible.

=== Transport ===
The whole town of South Shields had horse-drawn, then electric trams, before electric trolleybuses were introduced in 1936.

=== Harton Colliery ===
There was a colliery near Harton established sometime in the 1800s, as it features on, and has full rail infrastructure on, the Ordnance Survey map of 1896. There is also reference from the Durham Mining Museum to one fatality, where a man was "crushed in the cage" ('the cage' being slang for the carriage that transported men to and from the surface), on the 25 February 1851, although it is not known how well-established the colliery was at this point.

Harton Colliery was the location of a successful experiment in 1854 by the Astronomer Royal, George Biddell Airy, to calculate the mean density of the earth by recording the difference in the movements of a pendulum at the top and bottom of a coal mine.

== Sources ==
- Christie, Rev James (1904). Northumberland: Its History, Its Features, and Its People (2nd ed.). Carlisle: Chas. Thurnam & Sons.
