= David Ford (footballer) =

English footballer (born 1945)

Personal information
- Date of birth: 2 March 1945 (age 81)
- Place of birth: Sheffield, England
- Position: Winger

Youth career
- 1963–1965: Sheffield Wednesday

Senior career*
Years	Team	Apps	(Gls)
1965–1969	Sheffield Wednesday	122	(31)
1969–1971	Newcastle United	26	(3)
1971–1973	Sheffield United	27	(2)
1973–1976	Halifax Town	85	(6)
Total		260	(42)
- * Club domestic league appearances and goals

David Ford (born 2 March 1945) is an English former professional footballer, who played as a winger for Sheffield Wednesday, Newcastle United, Sheffield United and Halifax Town. His career lasted from 1965 to 1976 during which time he made 245 league appearances with 15 as substitute and scored 42 goals. He was an attacking right sided player.

== Career ==
Ford was born in Sheffield, South Yorkshire, he joined Sheffield Wednesday as a 16-year-old in 1961 and made his debut in the 1965–66 season against Sunderland on 23 October, coming off the bench to become the first ever substitute used by Wednesday in a League match. He scored his first goal in a 1–0 home league victory over Fulham on 20 November 1965. Ford's career really took off in the latter stages of that first season when he scored 13 goals in 18 league and cup matches between 5 March and 14 May. His goals helped Wednesday reach the 1966 FA Cup Final, he scored in the fifth round victory over Huddersfield Town and twice in the quarter final win at Blackburn Rovers. Ford's greatest career moment happened in that year's F.A Cup final when he scored after 57 minutes to put Wednesday 2–0 up against Everton and on the way to victory after their goalkeeper Gordon West spilled a fierce shot by John Fantham and Ford followed up to slide the ball into the far corner, however Wednesday were defeated as Everton came back to score three times and win the trophy.

David Ford's second season (1966–67) for Wednesday was also a success he finished the season joint top scorer with John Ritchie with 15 goals. He won two caps for the England Under 23 team during that season playing against Wales in an 8–1 win at Molineux and against Scotland in a 1–3 defeat at St James' Park.

Tragedy struck during 1967 when he was involved in a serious car accident in which his fiancée was killed. Ford took a long time to recover from the accident making only 14 appearances during the 1967–68 season and he was eventually sold to Newcastle United in December 1969. Ford made 26 league appearances in his 14-month stay with Newcastle, scoring three goals. He returned to play in Sheffield in January 1971 when he joined Wednesday's city rivals Sheffield United. He was not a regular in the United side making only 21 league appearances and scoring twice in over two years. He moved to Halifax Town in July 1973 and played there for three seasons making 83 league appearances and scoring six goals. He was released by Halifax in May 1976 ending David Ford's professional career. Ford played for England U23s in two matches.

== After retirement ==
Ford has been running his own plumbing and heating business in Sheffield for many years and he is part owner of the Champs sports bar on Ecclesall road in the city.

Ford appeared on the BBC television football quiz "Quiz Ball" in the winter of 1967 representing Sheffield Wednesday along with fellow player Gerry Young, assistant manager Jack Marshall and celebrity supporter Stan Barstow.

He also now owns the Cross Scythes Pub in Totley.

== Personal life ==
David is married with two children and four grandchildren.

== Honours ==
Sheffield Wednesday

- FA Cup runner-up: 1965–66
