= Cliff Marshall =

English footballer (1955–2021)

Personal information
- Date of birth: 4 November 1955
- Place of birth: Liverpool, England
- Date of death: 24 November 2021 (aged 66)
- Position: Forward

Senior career*
Years	Team	Apps	(Gls)
1973–1976	Everton	7	(0)
1976	Miami Toros	16	(5)
1976–1977	Southport	13	(0)
1977–1978	Winsford		

International career
1971	England Schoolboys	3	(1)
- * Club domestic league appearances and goals

Cliff Marshall (4 November 1955 – 24 November 2021) was an English professional footballer. Marshall began his career at Everton but found first-team opportunities limited. He joined the Miami Toros of the North American Soccer League in 1976, but returned to England to sign for Southport later that year.

He is often described as the first black Everton player, though sociologist Mark Christian notes that he was preceded by Mike Trebilcock, who may not have been recognised as such "due to his ambiguous black mixed heritage".

Marshall died on 24 November 2021, at the age of 66.

== Career ==
=== Everton ===
Signed by manager Billy Bingham, Marshall joined Everton, his boyhood team, from youth football in 1973; he turned down interest from Liverpool and Manchester United to join the club, later saying, "I could have gone to Liverpool or Man United, but I was always going to choose Everton." He graduated to the club's first-team squad in the 1974–75 season, making his debut for the Toffees on 11 January 1975 after coming on as a substitute in a 3–0 win over Leicester City in the First Division. Marshall made his first start for the club the following week on 18 January in another 3–0 win, this time away to Birmingham City. He was awarded one further league start and one FA Cup appearance in the remainder of the season.

The 1975–76 season saw Marshall make four league starts. Frustrated by a lack of playing time, he looked for a transfer at the end of the season. Speaking in 2009, Marshall revealed that a dispute with coaching staff at Goodison Park also contributed to his exit: "In the end, I got a bit disillusioned [at Everton]. I loved playing football, football was my first love. But what disillusioned me was some of the coaches at Everton said 'your first priority is to defend', and I didn't like that. I'm an attacker; defending should be my second priority. I moved on."

=== Miami Toros ===
On 17 May 1976, The Miami News reported that Marshall had been "signed in England early last week by [Miami] Toros general manager John Young." The Miami Toros were playing in the North American Soccer League's Eastern Division, and had only existed as the Toros since 1972. Marshall made his debut on 14 May in a 4–2 loss to the Chicago Sting and two days later he scored his first goal for the club in a 1–0 win over the Seattle Sounders; The Miami News praised his "speed and hustle", which had "changed the complexion of Miami's attack." The winger went on to record five goals and two assists that year, but was forced to leave Miami at the end of the season when the Toros folded. Marshall's spell in the US ended on a positive note, as he scored a hat-trick in his final Toros appearance, a 5–4 win over the Boston Minutemen on 15 August 1976.
