= Jack Taylor (referee) =

English association football referee

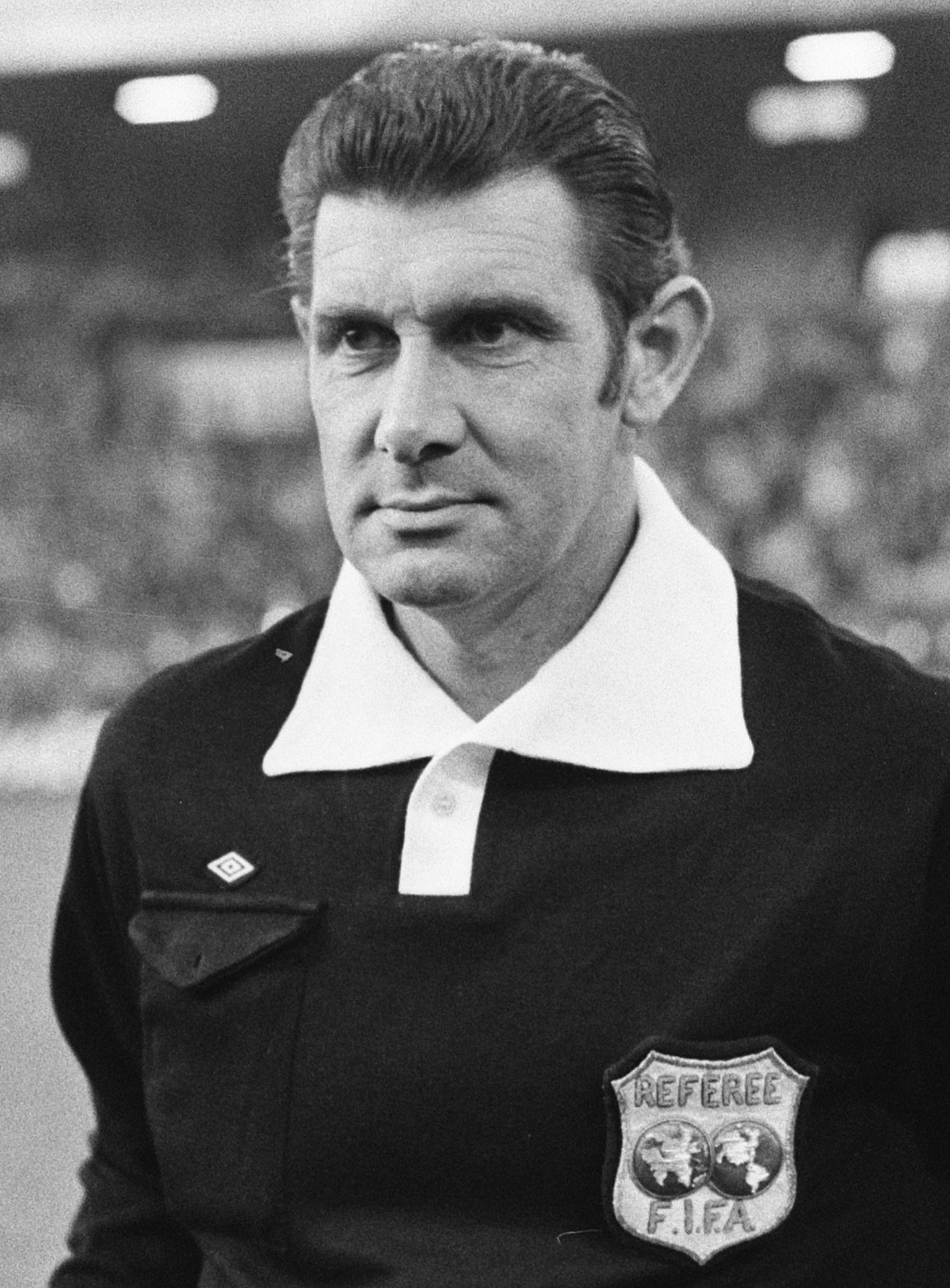
- Taylor in 1975
- Full name: John Keith Taylor
- Born: 21 May 1930 (Note: The Oxford Dictionary of National Biography and the 1939 Register give this date of birth. Some other sources give 21 April 1930.); Wolverhampton, Staffordshire, England
- Died: 27 July 2012 (aged 82); Shifnal, Shropshire, England
- Other occupation: Butcher

International
Years	League	Role
1963–1977	FIFA listed	Referee

John Keith Taylor OBE (21 May 1930 – 27 July 2012) was an English football referee. Later described by the Football League as "perhaps the finest English referee of all time", Taylor was famous for officiating in the 1974 FIFA World Cup Final during which he awarded two penalties in the first 30 minutes. The first of these penalties, awarded after just a minute of play, was the first penalty kick awarded in a World Cup final.

== Refereeing career ==
Taylor left school aged 14 and worked in his father's butcher's shop. There he met Jim Lock, secretary of the local football referees' association branch, who encouraged him to train as a referee. Taylor qualified as a class 3 referee, and refereed his first game when aged 17. With help from Lock and other prominent Midlands football officials, Taylor progressed to officiating at 70 to 80 matches a season in local leagues. In 1953, he was nominated by the Birmingham FA to be a linesman in a forthcoming international in France.

Aged 25, he became the youngest linesman on the Football League's list, running the line in a Third Division South match between Coventry City and Bournemouth & Boscombe Athletic in August 1955. Some three years later, he was promoted to the supplementary list of league referees, officiating at a Fourth Division match between Southport and Hartlepools United. In 1962, aged 31, he refereed the FA Amateur Cup final at Wembley Stadium between Crook Town and Hounslow Town, and was also promoted by the FA to the FIFA international panel.

In 1964 he refereed a match between Brazil and Argentina in Rio de Janeiro, and the following year was invited to referee two games between Brazil and the Soviet Union, as both teams prepared for the 1966 FIFA World Cup. Taylor first refereed at the FIFA World Cup in 1970, taking charge of a group game between Italy and Sweden. The only English official selected for the Mexico tournament, he was also a linesman in three matches. He was again selected for the 1974 tournament for which he became most noted; he was a linesman in two matches and refereed two others before the final.

=== 1974 World Cup Final ===
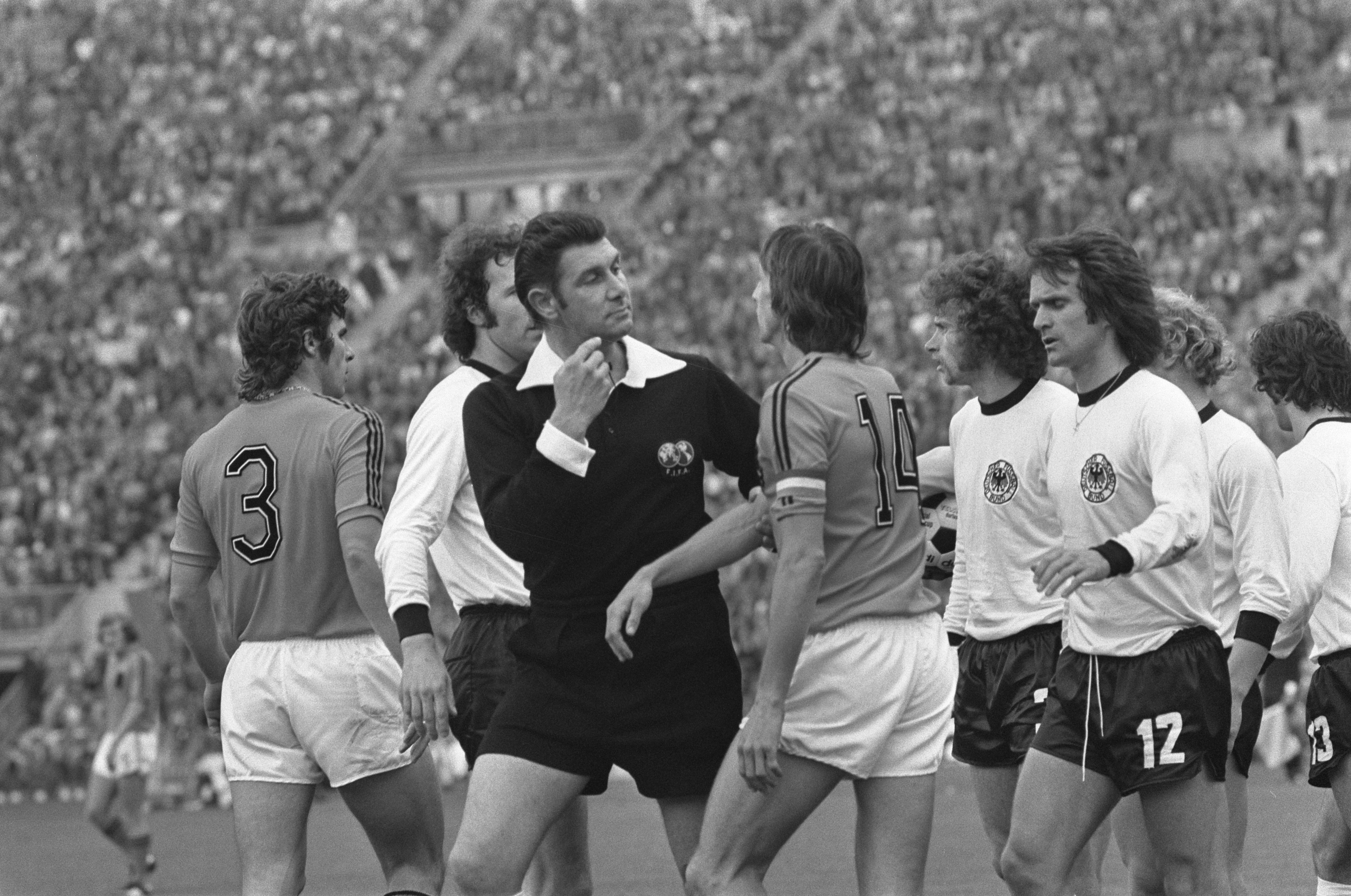
Taylor talking with Johan Cruyff during the final

Taylor was awarded the final between hosts West Germany and the Netherlands, played at Olympiastadion, Munich on 7 July 1974.

The kick off had to be delayed when Taylor spotted the ground staff had forgotten to put the corner flags out on the pitch. They had been removed to accommodate the closing ceremony which took place before the final. After just a minute of play he created World Cup history when he awarded a penalty kick, the first ever awarded in a World Cup final. The Netherlands were given a penalty after Uli Hoeneß threw himself into a challenge just on the right edge of the German penalty area, felling Johan Cruyff; it was successfully converted by Johan Neeskens.

In the 26th minute, he awarded a second penalty, this time to West Germany, penalising Dutch midfielder Wim Jansen for tripping German left midfielder Bernd Hölzenbein. As the teams walked off the pitch at half-time, Cruyff was cautioned for arguing with Taylor, the last of four players cautioned by Taylor during the final.

Taylor said of the incidents:

"The first penalty wasn't difficult to call. All I remember is thinking it was a 100% correct decision. As the ball went on the spot the whole stadium went quiet. Beckenbauer, the German skipper, came to me and said 'Taylor, you're an Englishman'. The kick went in and there was complete euphoria."

"What really does annoy me is the suggestion that I gave [the second penalty] to even things up. It was a trip or an attempted trip and the laws of the game are that's a penalty."

=== Later career ===
Taylor later recalled: "I literally did swap my butcher's apron for the whistle to take charge of the World Cup final." However, after the 1974 final, Taylor closed his butcher's shop to focus on refereeing, then retired in 1977. Over his career, Taylor served as a referee for 33 years, taking charge of more than 1,000 games, over 100 international fixtures played in 60 countries. He also took charge of several major club competition finals: in 1966 he officiated the FA Cup Final between Everton and Sheffield Wednesday, followed by the 1971 European Cup Final between AFC Ajax and Panathinaikos, both staged at Wembley Stadium.

After closing his butcher's shop he spent two seasons refereeing in Brazil before returning to England to become Commercial Director at Wolverhampton Wanderers in 1979. He was sacked in August 1982 when a new consortium took charge of the club. Taylor later became a refereeing coach in South Africa, Saudi Arabia, Russia, China and Brazil.

=== Honours ===
Taylor was awarded an OBE in the 1975 New Year Honours. He was awarded a special PFA Merit Award in 1977. He was inducted into the FIFA Hall of Fame on 1 February 1999 in Barcelona. In 2007, the Football League gave him a special award, describing him as "perhaps the finest English referee of all time". On 25 September 2013, he became the first referee inducted into the English Football Hall of Fame.

According to his obituary in The Independent:

Not that Taylor didn't possess a sense of humour, as he demonstrated after being badly cut in the face by a penny thrown from a bank of Luton Town fans at Kenilworth Road. When Eric Morecambe, the comedian and national treasure who also happened to be a Luton director, asked him if he was going to report the incident, the referee said he wasn't, and Morecambe replied: "Good, now can I have my penny back?" Taylor roared with laughter, and recounted the story for the rest of his life.

== Personal life ==
Taylor was born at 33 Sweetman Street in Wolverhampton, the son of a butcher, Albert Taylor, and his wife, Olive Gertrude (née Lane). Taylor grew up above the butcher's shop next to Wolverhampton Wanderers' Molineux home, and later managed the family business while continuing to referee at weekends.

Taylor married twice. In November 1956 he married a butcher's daughter, Hazel Mary Whitehouse (b. 1932). They had two sons and two daughters, but later divorced. In 1982, he married Susan Millicent Spann (b. 1933).

Taylor served as a lay magistrate in Wolverhampton for 25 years, and was a greyhound owner and National Greyhound Racing Club steward, and a steward at Wolverhampton Racecourse.

He died of pneumonia at his home in Lower Upton, Shifnal, Shropshire, on 27 July 2012, aged 82.

In 2016 his biography was included among 222 new entries in the Oxford Dictionary of National Biography.

== Major matches refereed ==
Date	Match	Tournament	Venue	Result	Ref
2 June 1971	Ajax vs. Panathinaikos	1971 European Cup final	Wembley Stadium, London	2–0	
7 July 1974	Netherlands vs. West Germany	1974 FIFA World Cup final	Olympiastadion, Munich	1–2	

== Books ==
- Soccer Refereeing : A Personal View, Jack Taylor (January 1978, Faber & Faber) ISBN 0-571-11299-4
- Jack Taylor, World Soccer Referee, David Jones & Jack Taylor (January 1976, Pelham Books) ISBN 0-7207-0890-7

== Notes ==
Sporting positions (England) Jack Taylor
Preceded by 1965 FA Cup Final; William Clements	1966 FA Cup Final Referee	Succeeded by 1967 FA Cup Final; Ken Dagnall
Preceded by 1970 European Cup Final (Italy); Concetto Lo Bello	1971 European Cup Final Referee	Succeeded by 1972 European Cup Final (France); Robert Helles
Preceded by 1970 FIFA World Cup Final (East Germany); Rudi Glöckner	1974 FIFA World Cup Final Referee	Succeeded by 1978 FIFA World Cup Final (Italy); Sergio Gonella
