= 1965–66 FA Cup =

Tournament details
- Country: England; Wales

Final positions
- Champions: Everton (3rd title)
- Runners-up: Sheffield Wednesday

Tournament statistics
- Top goal scorer: Denis Law (6)

The 1965–66 FA Cup was the 85th staging of the world's oldest football cup competition, the Football Association Challenge Cup, commonly known as the FA Cup. Everton won the competition for the third time, beating Sheffield Wednesday 3–2 in the final at Wembley.

Matches were scheduled to be played at the stadium of the team named first on the date specified for each round, which was always a Saturday. Some matches, however, might be rescheduled for other days if there were clashes with games for other competitions or the weather was inclement. If scores were level after 90 minutes had been played, a replay would take place at the stadium of the second-named team later the same week. If the replayed match was drawn further replays would be held until a winner was determined. If scores were level after 90 minutes had been played in a replay, a 30-minute period of extra time would be played.

== Calendar ==
Round	Date
First qualifying round	Saturday 4 September 1965
Second qualifying round	Saturday 18 September 1965
Third qualifying round	Saturday 2 October 1965
Fourth qualifying round	Saturday 16 October 1965
First round proper	Saturday 13 November 1965
Second round	Saturday 4 December 1965
Third round	Saturday 22 January 1966
Fourth round	Saturday 12 February 1966
Fifth round	Saturday 5 March 1966
Sixth round	Saturday 26 March 1966
Semi-finals	Saturday 23 April 1966
Final	Saturday 14 May 1966

== Qualifying rounds ==
Most participating clubs that were not members of the Football League competed in the qualifying rounds to secure one of 30 places available in the first round.

The winners from the fourth qualifying round were Gateshead, South Shields, Crook Town, Scarborough, Wigan Athletic, Altrincham, Fleetwood, South Liverpool, Hereford United, Kidderminster Harriers, Burton Albion, Grantham, Wisbech Town, Corby Town, Wellingborough Town, Bedford Town, Dartford, Folkestone Town, Gravesend & Northfleet, Leytonstone, Romford, Wimbledon, Guildford City, Wycombe Wanderers, Corinthian-Casuals, Wealdstone, Yeovil Town, Bath City, Merthyr Tydfil and Weymouth.

Corinthian-Casuals was the only qualifying club appearing in the main competition for the first time, although the two predecessor outfits Corinthian and Casuals had both featured at this stage prior to their merger in 1939. Of the others, Burton Albion had last progressed through to the first round in 1956-57, Leytonstone in 1952-53, Fleetwood and Wealdstone in 1949-50, and Wellingborough Town in 1928-29.

== Results ==
=== First round proper ===
At this stage the 48 clubs from the Football League Third and Fourth Divisions joined the 30 non-league clubs who came through the qualifying rounds. The final two non-league sides in the main draw, Hendon and Barnet received byes to this round, Hendon as the champions from the previous season's FA Amateur Cup and Barnet as the best-performed non-league club in the previous FA Cup tournament.

Matches were scheduled to be played on Saturday, 13 November 1965. Seven were drawn and went to replays two, four or five days later.

Tie no	Home team	Score	Away team	Date
1	Chesterfield	0–2	Chester	13 November 1965
2	Darlington	3–2	Bradford City	13 November 1965
3	Bournemouth & Boscombe Athletic	0–0	Weymouth	13 November 1965
Replay	Weymouth	1–4	Bournemouth & Boscombe Athletic	17 November 1965
4	Barnet	0–2	Dartford	13 November 1965
5	Barrow	1–2	Grimsby Town	13 November 1965
6	Bath City	2–0	Newport County	13 November 1965
7	Grantham	4–1	Hendon	13 November 1965
8	Reading	3–2	Bristol Rovers	13 November 1965
9	Walsall	6–3	Swansea Town	13 November 1965
10	Fleetwood	2–2	Rochdale	13 November 1965
Replay	Rochdale	5–0	Fleetwood	17 November 1965
11	Gillingham	1–2	Folkestone Town	13 November 1965
12	Crewe Alexandra	3–0	Scunthorpe United	13 November 1965
13	Lincoln City	1–3	Barnsley	13 November 1965
14	Swindon Town	5–1	Merthyr Tydfil	13 November 1965
15	Shrewsbury Town	2–1	Torquay United	13 November 1965
16	Doncaster Rovers	2–2	Wigan Athletic	13 November 1965
Replay	Wigan Athletic	3–1	Doncaster Rovers	17 November 1965
17	Wrexham	4–1	South Liverpool	13 November 1965
18	Tranmere Rovers	0–1	Stockport County	13 November 1965
19	Leytonstone	0–1	Hereford United	13 November 1965
20	Brentford	2–1	Yeovil Town	13 November 1965
21	Brighton & Hove Albion	10–1	Wisbech Town	13 November 1965
22	Millwall	3–1	Wealdstone	13 November 1965
23	Wimbledon	4–1	Gravesend & Northfleet	13 November 1965
24	Altrincham	6–0	Scarborough	13 November 1965
25	Southend United	3–1	Notts County	13 November 1965
26	Bradford Park Avenue	2–3	Hull City	13 November 1965
27	Exeter City	1–2	Bedford Town	13 November 1965
28	Hartlepools United	3–1	Workington	13 November 1965
29	Mansfield Town	1–3	Oldham Athletic	13 November 1965
30	Southport	2–0	Halifax Town	13 November 1965
31	Aldershot	2–1	Wellingborough Town	13 November 1965
32	Guildford City	2–2	Wycombe Wanderers	13 November 1965
Replay	Wycombe Wanderers	0–1	Guildford City	17 November 1965
33	Romford	1–1	Luton Town	13 November 1965
Replay	Luton Town	1–0	Romford	18 November 1965
34	Gateshead	4–2	Crook Town	13 November 1965
35	Peterborough United	2–1	Kidderminster Harriers	13 November 1965
36	South Shields	3–1	York City	13 November 1965
37	Colchester United	3–3	Queens Park Rangers	13 November 1965
Replay	Queens Park Rangers	4–0	Colchester United	17 November 1965
38	Corby Town	6–3	Burton Albion	13 November 1965
39	Oxford United	2–2	Port Vale	13 November 1965
Replay	Port Vale	3–2	Oxford United	15 November 1965
40	Corinthian-Casuals	1–5	Watford	13 November 1965

=== Second round ===
The matches were scheduled for Saturday, 4 December 1965. Four matches were drawn, with replays taking place later the same week. The Rochdale–Altrincham game was played midweek on 8 December, however.

Tie no	Home team	Score	Away team	Date
1	Chester	2–1	Wigan Athletic	4 December 1965
2	Darlington	0–1	Oldham Athletic	4 December 1965
3	Bournemouth & Boscombe Athletic	5–3	Bath City	4 December 1965
4	Grantham	1–6	Swindon Town	4 December 1965
5	Rochdale	1–3	Altrincham	8 December 1965
6	Reading	5–0	Brentford	4 December 1965
7	Crewe Alexandra	3–1	South Shields	4 December 1965
8	Shrewsbury Town	3–2	Peterborough United	4 December 1965
9	Queens Park Rangers	3–0	Guildford City	4 December 1965
10	Barnsley	1–1	Grimsby Town	4 December 1965
Replay	Grimsby Town	2–0	Barnsley	8 December 1965
11	Brighton & Hove Albion	1–1	Bedford Town	4 December 1965
Replay	Bedford Town	2–1	Brighton & Hove Albion	6 December 1965
12	Wimbledon	0–1	Folkestone Town	4 December 1965
13	Southend United	2–1	Watford	4 December 1965
14	Hartlepools United	2–0	Wrexham	4 December 1965
15	Port Vale	1–0	Dartford	4 December 1965
16	Southport	3–3	Stockport County	4 December 1965
Replay	Stockport County	0–2	Southport	13 December 1965
17	Hereford United	1–0	Millwall	4 December 1965
18	Aldershot	0–2	Walsall	4 December 1965
19	Gateshead	0–4	Hull City	4 December 1965
20	Corby Town	2–2	Luton Town	4 December 1965
Replay	Luton Town	0–1	Corby Town	7 December 1965

=== Third round ===
The 44 First and Second Division clubs entered the competition at this stage. The matches were scheduled for Saturday, 22 January 1966. Six matches were drawn and went to replays.

Tie no	Home team	Score	Away team	Date
1	Blackpool	1–1	Manchester City	22 January 1966
Replay	Manchester City	3–1	Blackpool	24 January 1966
2	Chester	1–3	Newcastle United	22 January 1966
3	Bournemouth & Boscombe Athletic	1–1	Burnley	22 January 1966
Replay	Burnley	7–0	Bournemouth & Boscombe Athletic	25 January 1966
4	Liverpool	1–2	Chelsea	22 January 1966
5	Reading	2–3	Sheffield Wednesday	22 January 1966
6	Folkestone Town	1–5	Crewe Alexandra	22 January 1966
7	Blackburn Rovers	3–0	Arsenal	22 January 1966
8	Aston Villa	1–2	Leicester City	22 January 1966
9	Bolton Wanderers	3–0	West Bromwich Albion	22 January 1966
10	Grimsby Town	0–0	Portsmouth	22 January 1966
Replay	Portsmouth	1–3	Grimsby Town	26 January 1966
11	Wolverhampton Wanderers	5–0	Altrincham	22 January 1966
12	Derby County	2–5	Manchester United	22 January 1966
13	Everton	3–0	Sunderland	22 January 1966
14	Swindon Town	1–2	Coventry City	22 January 1966
15	Sheffield United	3–1	Fulham	22 January 1966
16	Tottenham Hotspur	4–0	Middlesbrough	22 January 1966
17	Queens Park Rangers	0–0	Shrewsbury Town	22 January 1966
Replay	Shrewsbury Town	1–0	Queens Park Rangers	26 January 1966
18	Northampton Town	1–2	Nottingham Forest	22 January 1966
19	Plymouth Argyle	6–0	Corby Town	22 January 1966
20	Hull City	1–0	Southampton	22 January 1966
21	Carlisle United	3–0	Crystal Palace	22 January 1966
22	Oldham Athletic	2–2	West Ham United	22 January 1966
Replay	West Ham United	2–1	Oldham Athletic	24 January 1966
23	Huddersfield Town	3–1	Hartlepools United	24 January 1966
24	Bedford Town	2–1	Hereford United	22 January 1966
25	Cardiff City	2–1	Port Vale	26 January 1966
26	Charlton Athletic	2–3	Preston North End	22 January 1966
27	Southport	0–0	Ipswich Town	22 January 1966
Replay	Ipswich Town	2–3	Southport	25 January 1966
28	Leeds United	6–0	Bury	22 January 1966
29	Stoke City	0–2	Walsall	22 January 1966
30	Rotherham United	3–2	Southend United	22 January 1966
31	Birmingham City	3–2	Bristol City	22 January 1966
32	Leyton Orient	1–3	Norwich City	22 January 1966

=== Fourth round ===
The matches were scheduled for Saturday, 12 February 1966. Five matches were drawn and went to replays. The replays were all played two, three or four days later. The Shrewsbury Town–Carlisle United match went to a second replay at Deepdale on 21 February. Bedford Town was the last non-league club left in the competition.

Tie no	Home team	Score	Away team	Date
1	Bolton Wanderers	1–1	Preston North End	12 February 1966
Replay	Preston North End	3–2	Bolton Wanderers	14 February 1966
2	Wolverhampton Wanderers	3–0	Sheffield United	12 February 1966
3	Crewe Alexandra	1–1	Coventry City	12 February 1966
Replay	Coventry City	4–1	Crewe Alexandra	14 February 1966
4	Shrewsbury Town	0–0	Carlisle United	12 February 1966
Replay	Carlisle United	1–1	Shrewsbury Town	15 February 1966
Replay	Shrewsbury Town	4–3	Carlisle United	21 February 1966
5	Newcastle United	1–2	Sheffield Wednesday	12 February 1966
6	Tottenham Hotspur	4–3	Burnley	12 February 1966
7	Manchester City	2–0	Grimsby Town	12 February 1966
8	West Ham United	3–3	Blackburn Rovers	12 February 1966
Replay	Blackburn Rovers	4–1	West Ham United	16 February 1966
9	Manchester United	0–0	Rotherham United	12 February 1966
Replay	Rotherham United	0–1	Manchester United	15 February 1966
10	Norwich City	3–2	Walsall	12 February 1966
11	Plymouth Argyle	0–2	Huddersfield Town	12 February 1966
12	Hull City	2–0	Nottingham Forest	12 February 1966
13	Chelsea	1–0	Leeds United	12 February 1966
14	Bedford Town	0–3	Everton	12 February 1966
15	Southport	2–0	Cardiff City	12 February 1966
16	Birmingham City	1–2	Leicester City	12 February 1966

=== Fifth round ===
The matches were scheduled for Saturday, 5 March 1966. Two games required replays on the following Wednesday.

Tie no	Home team	Score	Away team	Date
1	Preston North End	2–1	Tottenham Hotspur	5 March 1966
2	Wolverhampton Wanderers	2–4	Manchester United	5 March 1966
3	Everton	3–0	Coventry City	5 March 1966
4	Manchester City	2–2	Leicester City	5 March 1966
Replay	Leicester City	0–1	Manchester City	9 March 1966
5	Norwich City	2–2	Blackburn Rovers	5 March 1966
Replay	Blackburn Rovers	3–2	Norwich City	9 March 1966
6	Hull City	2–0	Southport	5 March 1966
7	Chelsea	3–2	Shrewsbury Town	5 March 1966
8	Huddersfield Town	1–2	Sheffield Wednesday	5 March 1966

=== Sixth round ===
The four quarter-final ties were scheduled to be played on 26 March 1966. Three of the four matches went to replays and the Manchester City–Everton game required a second replay to settle the tie.

Tie no	Home team	Score	Away team	Date
1	Preston North End	1–1	Manchester United	26 March 1966
Replay	Manchester United	3–1	Preston North End	30 March 1966
2	Blackburn Rovers	1–2	Sheffield Wednesday	26 March 1966
3	Manchester City	0–0	Everton	26 March 1966
Replay	Everton	0–0	Manchester City	29 March 1966
Replay	Everton	2–0	Manchester City	5 April 1966
4	Chelsea	2–2	Hull City	26 March 1966
Replay	Hull City	1–3	Chelsea	31 March 1966

=== Semi-finals ===
The semi-final matches were played on Saturday, 23 April 1966 with no replays required. Everton and Sheffield Wednesday came through the semi-final round to meet at Wembley.

23 April 1966
15:00

Everton	1–0	Manchester United
Harvey 79'	Report

Burnden Park, Bolton
Referee: Eric Jennings, Stourbridge
23 April 1966
15:00

Sheffield Wednesday	2–0	Chelsea
Pugh 55'; McCalliog 90'	Report

Villa Park, Birmingham
Attendance: 62,000
Referee: Ken Dagnall, Bolton

=== Final ===
The 1966 FA Cup final was contested by Sheffield Wednesday and Everton at Wembley on Saturday 14 May 1966. Everton were looking to become the first team since Bury won in 1903 to win the cup without conceding a goal, while Sheffield Wednesday were the second Yorkshire side in succession to reach Wembley, following Leeds United's losing appearance in the 1965 final. The match finished 3–2 to Everton.

14 May 1966
15:00 BST

Everton	3 – 2	Sheffield Wednesday
Trebilcock 59' 64'; Temple 74'		McCalliog 4'; Ford 57'

Wembley, London
Attendance: 100,000
Referee: Jack Taylor (Wolverhampton)

Everton	Sheffield Wednesday
