= List of Manchester City F.C. players (25–99 appearances) =

Manchester City Football Club, then known as Ardwick, first entered the Football Alliance in the 1891–92 season. In 1892, the Football League decided to expand, and invited the Alliance clubs to join; having chosen not to apply for entry into the First Division, Ardwick were placed in the newly formed Second Division. In April 1894 Ardwick became Manchester City, following the creation of Manchester City Football Club Ltd. as a limited company.

The club's first team have competed in numerous nationally and internationally organised competitions, and all players who have played between 25 and 99 such matches, either as a member of the starting eleven or as a substitute, are listed below. Each player's details include the duration of his Manchester City career, his typical playing position while with the club, and the number of games played and goals scored in domestic league matches and in all senior competitive matches. Where applicable, the list also includes the national team for which the player was selected, and the number of senior international caps he won while playing for the club. The names are ordered first by number of appearances in total, then by date of debut.

== Introduction ==
More than 290 players have represented Manchester City in at least 25 and fewer than 100 competitive first team matches. A number of the players listed achieved firsts or milestones for the club. David Weir, who captained the club in the Ardwick era, was the first England international to play for the club. Canadian Walter Bowman was the first international from outside the British Isles to play in the Football League. Denis Law, Steve Daley and Robinho were all signed for transfer fees that broke the British transfer fee record. Marc-Vivien Foé scored the last ever goal by a Manchester City player at the club's Maine Road ground in April 2003, just two months before his death, when he collapsed during an international match. The first competitive goal at the new City of Manchester Stadium was scored by Trevor Sinclair in August 2003.

Several listed players won medals while at the club. Herbert Burgess and George Livingstone both played in the 1904 FA Cup Final that brought Manchester City's first major trophy. Laurie Barnett won the Cup in 1934, Jack Dyson scored in the 1956 final, and Mario Balotelli, Patrick Vieira and Adam Johnson all took part in the club's 2011 FA Cup victory. Ken Mulhearn kept goal for the majority of the 1967–68 league championship winning season, and Ian Bowyer was part of the team that won the UEFA Cup Winners' Cup in 1970. Several members of the squads that won eight Premier League titles between 2012 and 2024 are listed. Nine of these players are still contracted to the club and may add to their current totals.

== Key ==
Positions tactical evolution
Pre-1970s		1970s onwards	
GK	Goalkeeper		
FB	Full back	DF	Full back or Wing-back
CH	Centre half	DF	Centre back
HB	Half back	MF	Holding midfielder
FW	Outside forward (a.k.a. Winger)	DF MF	Wing-back or Attacking midfielder
FW	Inside forward	MF FW	Attacking midfielder / Second striker
FW	Centre forward	FW	Centre forward / Striker / False #9

Position

- Playing positions are listed according to the tactical formations that were employed at the time. Thus the more defensive emphasis in the responsibilities of many of the old forward and midfield positions, and their corresponding name changes, reflects the tactical evolution that occurred in the sport from the late 1960s onwards. The position listed is that in which the player played most frequently for the club.

Club career

- Club career is defined as the first and last calendar years in which the player appeared for the club in any of the competitions listed below, irrespective of how long the player was contracted to the club. For players who had two or more spells at the club, the years for each period are listed separately.

League appearances and League goals

- League appearances and goals comprise those in the Football Alliance, the Football League and the Premier League. Appearances in the 1939–40 Football League season, abandoned after three games because of the Second World War, are excluded.

Total appearances and Total goals

- Total appearances and goals comprise those in the Football Alliance, Football League (including test matches and play-offs), Premier League, FA Cup, Football League Cup, UEFA Champions League/European Cup, UEFA Europa League/UEFA Cup, FA Community Shield/Charity Shield, Associate Members' Cup, and defunct competitions the UEFA Cup Winners' Cup, Anglo-Italian Cup, Anglo-Italian League Cup, Texaco Cup, Anglo-Scottish Cup and Full Members' Cup. Matches in wartime competitions are excluded.

International selection

- Countries are listed only for players who have been selected for international football. Only the highest level of international competition is given.
- For players having played at full international level, the caps column counts the number of such appearances during his career with the club.

Last update

- Statistics are correct as of 30 May 2026

== Players with 25 to 99 appearances ==
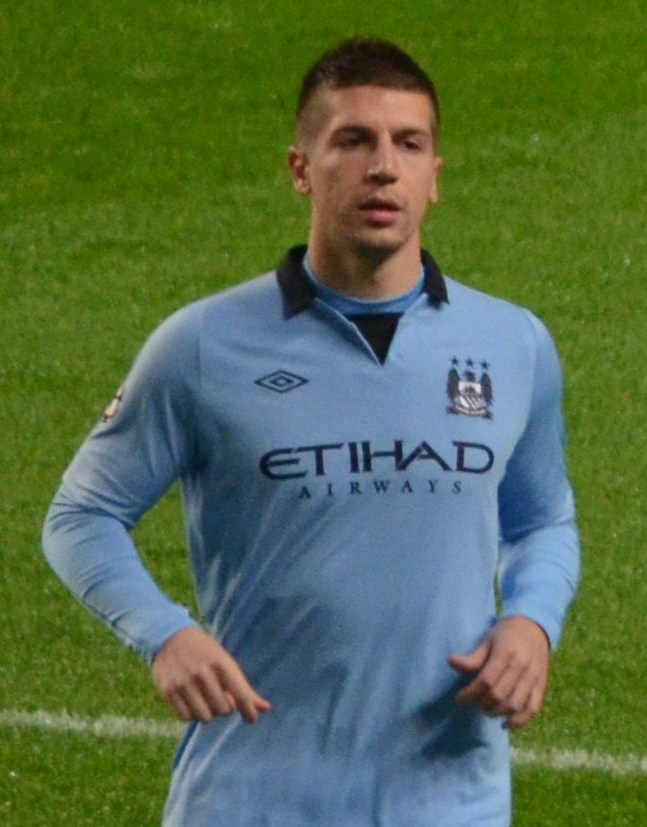
Matija Nastasić joined Manchester City in 2012.

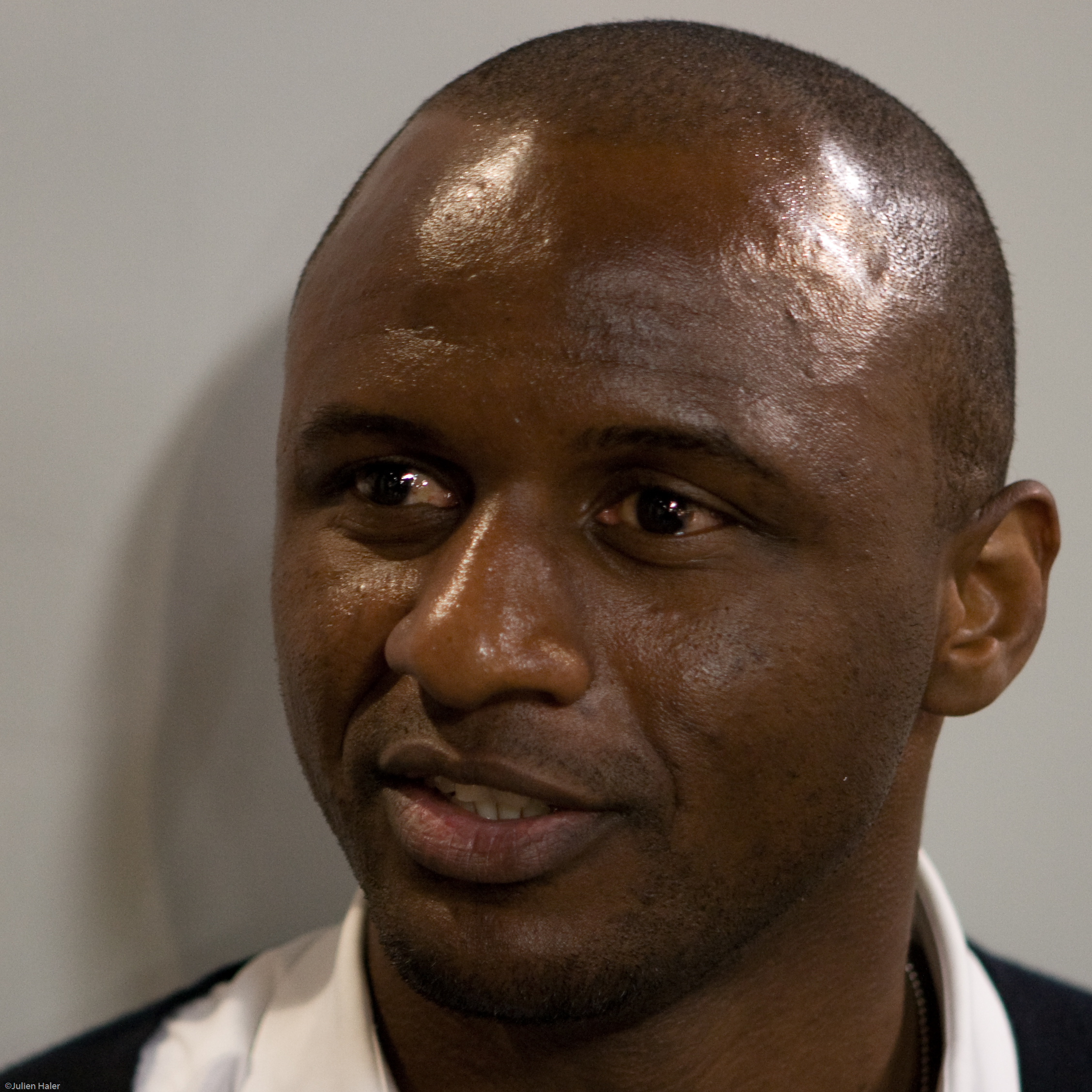
World Cup winner Patrick Vieira ended his playing career at Manchester City.

The signing of Robinho for £32.5 million in 2008 broke the British transfer fee record.

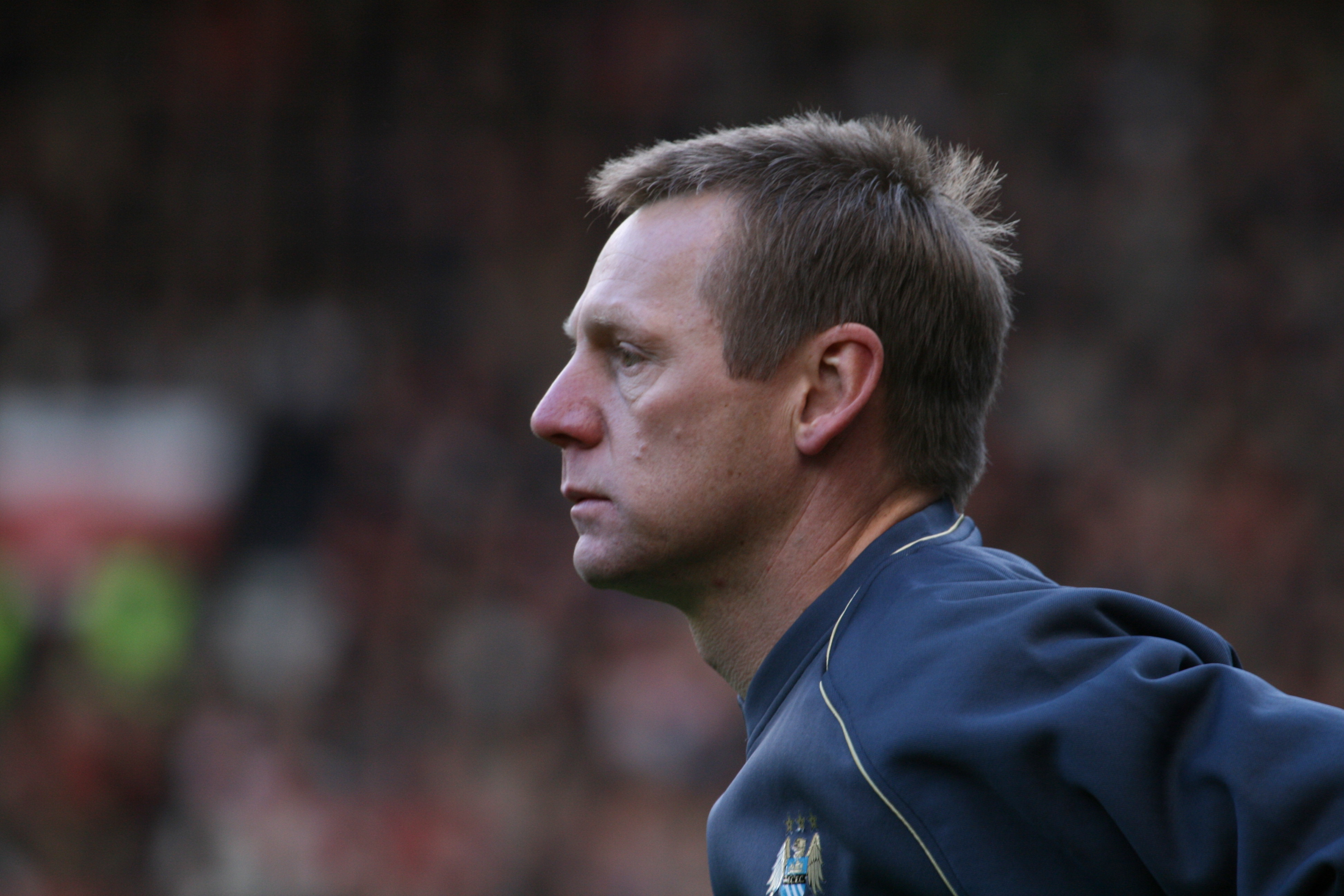
Stuart Pearce played for Manchester City in the 2001–02 season, and went on to manage the club between 2005 and 2007.

Players with 25 to 99 competitive appearances for Manchester City F.C. (with current players highlighted in blue)
Player	Position	Club career	League apps	League goals	Total apps	Total goals	International selection	Caps	Refs
Lewis Barber	GK	1927–1930	92	0	99	0	—	—	
David Phillips	MF	1984–1986	81	13	99	16	Wales	10	
Frank Norgrove	FB	1904–1911	94	1	98	1	—	—	
Steve McMahon	MF	1992–1994	87	1	98	1	England	0	
Trevor Sinclair	MF	2003–2007	82	5	98	6	England	1	
Gary Megson	MF	1989–1992	82	2	97	2	—	—	
Adam Johnson	MF	2010–2012	73	11	97	15	England	12	
Mateo Kovačić	MF	2023–	67	7	97	10	Croatia	15	
John McTavish	CH	1953–1960	93	0	96	0	—	—	
Derek Jeffries	DF	1969–1973	73	0	95	0	—	—	
Herbert Burgess	FB	1903–1906	85	2	94	2	England	4	
Peter Dobing	FW	1961–1963	82	31	94	32	England under-23	—	
Mick Channon	FW	1977–1980	72	24	94	30	England	1	
Max Woosnam	CH	1920–1925	86	4	93	4	England	1	
David Robson	FB	1892–1894; 1894–1896	86	1	93	1	—	—	
Laurie Barnett	FB	1930–1934	84	0	93	0	—	—	
Tony Henry	MF	1976–1981	79	6	93	12	—	—	
Robbie Fowler	FW	2003–2006	80	21	92	28	England	0	
Lee Crooks	DF / MF	1996–2000	76	2	91	2	England youth	—	
Fred Howard	FW	1913–1920	79	40	90	43	—	—	
Jimmy Heale	FW	1934–1939	84	39	90	41	—	—	
Neil Pointon	FB	1990–1992	74	2	90	2	—	—	
Pat Finnerhan	FW	1894–1897	85	27	89	28	—	—	
Adrian Heath	MF	1990–1992	75	4	89	5	England under-21	—	
Fabian Delph	MF	2015–2019	57	4	89	5	England		
Dick Ray	FB	1896–1900	82	3	88	3	—	—	
George Livingstone	HB	1903–1906	81	19	88	20	Scotland	1	
Edwin Hughes	FB	1912–1919	77	2	88	3	Wales	3	
Claudio Reyna	MF	2003–2006	77	4	87	4	United States	15	
Bacary Sagna	DF	2014–2017	54	0	86	0	France		
Eric Nixon	GK	1985–1988	58	0	84	0	—	—	
Savinho	MF	2024–2026	53	2	84	7	Brazil	6	
Billy Felton	FB	1929–1932	73	0	83	0	England	0	
Dave Halliday	FW	1930–1933	76	47	82	51	—	—	
Ernie Phillips	FB	1949–1951	80	0	82	0	—	—	
Denis Law	FW	1960–1961; 1973–1974	68	30	82	38	Scotland	11	
Trevor Morley	FW	1988–1989	72	18	82	21	—	—	
Fitzroy Simpson	MF	1992–1995	71	4	82	4	Jamaica	0	
Darren Huckerby	FW	2000–2003	69	22	82	31	England B	—	
James Blair	HB	1906–1910	76	0	81	1	—	—	
Imre Varadi	FW	1986–1988	65	26	81	31	—	—	
Danny Granville	DF	1999–2001	70	3	80	3	England under-21	—	
Elano	MF	2007–2009	62	14	80	18	Brazil	18	
Mario Balotelli	FW	2010–2013	54	20	80	30	Italy	15	
Billy Linacre	FW	1947–1949	75	6	79	7	—	—	
Jackie Oakes	FW	1948–1950	77	9	79	9	—	—	
Ivor Broadis	FW	1951–1953	74	10	79	12	England	8	
Jimmy Murray	FW	1963–1967	70	43	79	46	England under-23	—	
Paul Moulden	FW	1986–1989	64	18	79	25	England youth	—	
Eliaquim Mangala	DF	2014–2019	57	0	79	0	France	2	
Ted Hanney	HB	1913–1919	68	1	78	1	—	—	
Jack Warner	FW	1921–1925	76	15	78	15	—	—	
Alan Kernaghan	DF	1993–1997	63	1	78	2	Republic of Ireland	15	
Ali Benarbia	MF	2001–2003	71	11	78	11	Algeria	0	
George Dougal	FW	1898–1901	75	13	77	13	—	—	
Fred Fayers	HB	1920–1923	73	5	77	5	England amateur	—	
Colin Hendry	DF	1989–1991	61	5	77	10	Scotland	0	
Mark Kennedy	MF	1999–2001	66	8	77	11	Republic of Ireland	9	
Derek Kevan	FW	1963–1965	67	48	76	56	England	0	
Steve MacKenzie	MF	1979–1981	58	8	76	10	England under-21	—	
Javi García	MF	2012–2014	53	2	76	2	Spain	0	
Dennis Westcott	FW	1950–1952	72	37	75	37	—	—	
Paulo Wanchope	FW	2000–2004	64	27	75	29	Costa Rica	23	
Benjamin Mendy	DF	2017–2023	50	2	75	2	France	7	
Hugh Morris	FW	1891–1893; 1895–1896	66	31	74	31	Wales	1	
Bob Milarvie	FW	1891–1896	69	13	73	14	—	—	
Fred Threlfall	FW	1899–1904	67	8	73	8	—	—	
Jack Dyson	FW	1955–1960	62	26	73	29	—	—	
Keith MacRae	GK	1973–1980	56	0	72	0	Scotland under-23	—	
Tony Vaughan	DF	1997–1999	58	2	72	2	England youth	—	
Martin Petrov	MF	2007–2010	59	9	72	12	Bulgaria	19	
John Gidman	DF	1986–1988	53	1	71	3	England	0	
Dietmar Hamann	MF	2006–2009	54	0	71	1	Germany	0	
Bert Gray	GK	1927–1929	68	0	70	0	Wales	5	
Ian Bowyer	FW	1968–1971	50	13	70	17	—	—	
Jamie Pollock	MF	1998–2000	58	5	70	5	England under-21	—	
Jimmy Ross	FW	1899–1902	67	21	69	22	—	—	
Colin Barrett	FB	1972–1976	53	0	69	1	—	—	
Shay Given	GK	2009–2011	50	0	69	0	Republic of Ireland	22	
Sid Hoad	FW	1911–1914	64	1	68	2	—	—	
Jim Tolmie	MF	1983–1985	61	15	68	19	Scotland under-21	—	
Clive Allen	FW	1989–1991	53	16	68	21	England	0	
Ray Sambrook	FW	1958–1961	62	13	67	13	—	—	
Mark Ward	MF	1990–1991	55	14	67	16	—	—	
Eyal Berkovic	MF	2001–2003	56	7	67	9	Israel	6	
Jack Hannaway	HB	1951–1956	64	0	66	0	—	—	
Stan Horne	HB	1965–1967	50	0	66	0	—	—	
Brian Gayle	DF	1988–1989	55	3	66	3	—	—	
Willie McOustra	HB	1902–1907	65	6	65	6	—	—	
Davie Ross	FW	1907–1911	61	19	65	19	—	—	
Clive Colbridge	FW	1959–1961	62	12	65	12	—	—	
Dave Bennett	MF	1979–1981	52	9	65	15	—	—	
Peter Beagrie	MF	1994–1997	52	3	65	5	England B	—	
Paul Bosvelt	MF	2003–2005	53	2	65	3	Netherlands	5	
Georgios Samaras	FW	2006–2007	55	8	65	12	Greece	19	
George Mann	HB	1894–1897	59	7	64	7	—	—	
Tommy Tait	FW	1928–1930	61	43	64	46	—	—	
Gordon Clark	FB	1936–1946	55	0	64	0	—	—	
Kelechi Iheanacho	FW	2015–2017	46	12	64	21	Nigeria	10	
William Douglas	GK	1890–1894	58	0	63	0	—	—	
Paul Stewart	FW	1987–1988	51	26	63	30	England	0	
Michael Ball	DF	2007–2009	48	0	63	1	England	0	
Joe Davies	FW	1891–1893; 1896; 1900	57	20	62	21	Wales	3	
Johnny Williamson	FW	1950–1955	59	18	62	19	—	—	
Ken Mulhearn	GK	1967–1970	50	0	62	0	—	—	
Alan Harper	DF	1989–1991	52	1	62	2	England youth	—	
Paul Walsh	FW	1994–1995	53	16	62	19	England	0	
Stephen Jordan	DF	2003–2007	51	0	62	0	—	—	
Javier Garrido	DF	2007–2010	49	2	62	2	Spain under-21	—	
Hugh Morris	FW	1922–1924	57	0	61	0	—	—	
Frank McCourt	HB	1951–1954	61	4	61	4	Northern Ireland	6	
Claudio Bravo	GK	2016–2020	29	0	61	0	Chile	21	
Omar Marmoush	FW	2025–	37	10	61	16	Egypt	13	
Jack Brennan	HB	1914–1922	56	0	60	0	—	—	
Dave Bacuzzi	FB	1964–1966	57	0	60	0	England youth	—	
Tommy Hutchison	MF	1980–1982	46	4	60	5	Scotland	0	
Danilo	DF	2017–2019	34	4	60	4	Brazil		
Martyn Margetson	GK	1991–1998	51	0	59	0	Wales	0	
Jon Macken	FW	2002–2005	51	7	59	12	Republic of Ireland	1	
Gélson Fernandes	MF	2007–2009	43	3	59	4	Switzerland	17	
Nico González	MF	2025–2026	36	2	59	4	—	—	
Maurice Dunkley	FW	1938–1947	51	5	58	6	—	—	
Rick Holden	MF	1992–1993	50	3	58	5	—	—	
David Sommeil	DF	2003–2006	49	4	58	5	France B	—	
Wayne Bridge	DF	2009–2013	42	0	58	0	England	4	
Stockport Smith	FW	1897–1900	54	22	57	22	—	—	
Alan Ogley	GK	1964–1967	51	0	57	0	—	—	
Richard Jobson	DF	1998–2001	50	4	57	4	England B	—	
Jack Allen	FB	1920–1924	52	0	56	0	—	—	
Niclas Jensen	DF	2002–2003	51	2	56	2	Denmark	18	
Stefan Ortega	GK	2022–2026	25	0	56	0	—	—	
Rayan Cherki	MF	2025–	33	4	56	11	France	3	
Ron Phoenix	HB	1952–1959	53	2	55	2	—	—	
David Shawcross	HB	1958–1964	47	2	55	2	England under-23	—	
Steve Daley	MF	1979–1980	48	4	54	4	England B	—	
Danny Mills	DF	2004–2006	51	1	54	1	England	0	
Billy Wilson	HB	1922–1927	48	0	53	0	—	—	
David Brightwell	DF	1992–1995	43	1	53	2	—	—	
Gareth Taylor	FW	1998–1999	43	9	53	10	Wales	0	
Robinho	FW	2008–2010	41	14	53	16	Brazil	25	
John Benson	FB	1962–1964	44	0	52	0	—	—	
Wyn Davies	FW	1971–1973	45	8	52	9	Wales	3	
Derek Parlane	FW	1983–1984	48	20	52	23	Scotland	0	
Mark Lillis	FW	1985–1986	39	11	51	15	—	—	
Ben Thatcher	DF	2004–2006	47	0	51	0	Wales	4	
Matija Nastasić	DF	2012–2014	34	0	51	0	Serbia	14	
Ian Mellor	FW	1971–1973	40	7	50	10	—	—	
Mark Seagraves	DF	1987–1989	42	0	50	0	England youth	—	
Eike Immel	GK	1995–1996	42	0	50	0	Germany	0	
Craig Bellamy	FW	2009–2011	40	12	50	15	Wales	10	
Tijjani Reijnders	MF	2025–2026	28	5	50	7	Netherlands	12	
Danny Whittle	HB	1890–1894	46	4	49	5	—	—	
Walter Bowman	FW	1893–1898	47	3	49	3	Canada	0	
Alex Harley	FW	1962–1963	40	23	49	32	—	—	
Ged Keegan	FB	1974–1978	37	2	49	3	England under-21	—	
Gordon Smith	FW	1984–1985	42	13	49	15	Scotland under-21	—	
Álvaro Negredo	FW	2013–2014	31	9	49	23	Spain	3	
Sandy Rowan	FW	1894–1896	45	23	48	24	—	—	
Louis Cardwell	FB	1938–1946	42	0	48	0	—	—	
Bobby Cunliffe	FW	1946–1956	44	9	48	10	—	—	
Frank Carrodus	FW	1970–1974	42	1	48	2	—	—	
Andy Morrison	DF	1998–2001	37	4	48	5	—	—	
Willy Caballero	GK	2014–2017	23	0	48	0	Argentina under-23	0	
Jimmy Bannister	FW	1902–1906	45	21	47	22	—	—	
Joe Cartwright	FW	1913–1920	38	3	47	5	—	—	
Herbert Tyler	HB	1919–1921	44	0	47	0	—	—	
Jackie Plenderleith	CH	1960–1963	41	0	47	0	Scotland	1	
Alf-Inge Haaland	DF	2000–2002	38	3	47	3	Norway	1	
Vedran Ćorluka	DF	2007–2008	38	1	47	1	Croatia	16	
Oscar Bobb	MF	2021–2026	26	1	47	3	Norway	10	
Abdukodir Khusanov	DF	2025–	27	0	47	1	Uzbekistan	6	
Bob Grieve	FW	1906–1909	44	18	46	19	—	—	
William Wallace	FW	1912–1914	43	9	46	9	—	—	
Sid Cann	FB	1930–1934	42	0	46	0	—	—	
Perry Suckling	GK	1986–1988	39	0	46	0	England under-21	—	
Ged Brannan	MF	1997–1998	43	4	46	4	—	—	
Lee Bradbury	FW	1997–1998	40	10	46	11	England under-21	—	
Jim Whitley	MF	1998–2000	38	0	46	1	Northern Ireland	3	
Patrick Vieira	MF	2010–2011	28	3	46	6	France	0	
Wilfried Bony	FW	2015–2017	36	6	46	11	Ivory Coast		
Paul Futcher	DF	1978–1980	37	0	45	0	England under-21	—	
Eddie McGoldrick	MF	1996–1997	40	0	45	0	Republic of Ireland	0	
Kiki Musampa	MF	2005–2006	41	3	45	4	Netherlands under-21	—	
Michael Johnson	MF	2006–2009	37	2	45	3	England under-21	—	
Emmanuel Adebayor	FW	2009–2010	34	15	45	19	Togo	4	
Jack Lyall	GK	1909–1910	40	0	44	0	Scotland	0	
Tommy Broad	FW	1919–1921	32	0	44	0	—	—	
Arthur Mann	DF	1968–1971	35	0	44	0	—	—	
Steve McManaman	MF	2003–2005	35	0	44	0	England	0	
Stevan Jovetić	FW	2013–2016	30	8	44	11	Montenegro	8	
Kazimierz Deyna	MF	1978–1980	38	12	43	13	Poland	0	
Nigel Clough	MF	1996–1997	38	4	43	5	England	0	
Stuart Pearce	DF	2001–2002	38	3	43	3	England	0	
Ferran Torres	FW	2020–2021	28	9	43	16	Spain	22	
Gianluigi Donnarumma	GK	2025–	34	0	43	0	Italy	7	
James Hosie	FW	1901–1902	39	3	42	3	—	—	
Peter Bell	FW	1926–1928	42	7	42	7	—	—	
Fred Hill	FW	1970–1972	35	3	42	3	England	0	
Jim Melrose	FW	1984–1985	34	8	42	11	Scotland under-21	—	
Gordon Davies	FW	1985–1986	31	9	42	15	Wales	2	
Jô	FW	2008–2011	21	1	42	6	Brazil	0	
Harry Middleton	HB	1892–1894	38	4	41	4	—	—	
Len Wall	HB	1910–1913	41	2	41	2	—	—	
James Cumming	FW	1913–1915	35	0	41	3	—	—	
Tom Blair	GK	1921–1922	38	0	41	0	—	—	
Eric Williams	FB	1947–1950	38	0	41	0	—	—	
Roy Warhurst	HB	1957–1958	40	2	41	2	—	—	
Roger Palmer	FW	1977–1980	31	9	41	11	—	—	
Terry Cooke	MF	1999	34	7	41	8	England under-21	—	
Carlo Nash	GK	2001–2002	38	0	41	0	—	—	
Michael Tarnat	DF	2003–2004	32	3	41	4	Germany	0	
Cole Palmer	MF	2020–2023	19	0	41	6	England under-21	—	
James Sharples	FW	1894–1897	39	20	40	20	—	—	
William Orr	FB	1901–1903	36	0	40	0	—	—	
John Edmondson	GK	1902–1906	38	0	40	0	—	—	
Percy Hill	FB	1906–1908	38	0	40	0	—	—	
Bradley Wright-Phillips	FW	2004–2006	32	2	40	2	England under-20	—	
Gerry Baker	FW	1960–1961	37	14	39	14	United States	0	
Vic Gomersall	FB	1961–1965	39	0	39	0	—	—	
Nigel Gleghorn	MF	1988–1989	34	7	39	11	—	—	
Jimmy McLuckie	HB	1933–1934	32	1	38	1	Scotland	1	
Ron Healey	GK	1971–1973	30	0	38	0	Republic of Ireland	0	
Colin Viljoen	MF	1978–1980	27	0	38	1	England	0	
David Cross	FW	1982–1983	31	12	38	13	—	—	
Wayne Biggins	FW	1988–1989	32	9	38	10	—	—	
Tommy Wright	GK	1997–2000	34	0	38	0	Northern Ireland	4	
Danny Allsopp	FW	1998–2000	29	4	38	6	Australia	0	
Marc-Vivien Foé	MF	2002–2003	35	9	38	9	Cameroon	5	
Frank Lampard	MF	2014–2015	32	6	38	8	England	0	
Sergio Gómez	DF	2022–2024	18	0	38	0	—	—	
John Milne	FW	1890–1894	36	8	37	8	—	—	
Frank Dyer	FB	1893–1898	36	3	37	3	—	—	
Frank Thompson	FB	1922–1926	33	0	37	0	—	—	
James Calderwood	FW	1922–1926	35	0	37	0	—	—	
Bob Donnelly	HB	1935–1937	37	1	37	1	—	—	
Geoff Hammond	DF	1974–1976	34	1	37	2	—	—	
Craig Russell	FW	1997–1999	31	2	37	4	—	—	
Spencer Prior	DF	2000–2001	30	4	37	4	—	—	
Dedryck Boyata	DF	2010–2015	14	0	36	1	Belgium	8	
Charles Broadhurst	FW	1927–1928	33	25	36	26	—	—	
Eddie McMorran	FW	1947–1948	33	12	36	12	—	—	
Gerry Gow	MF	1980–1981	26	5	36	7	Scotland under-23	—	
Mark Brennan	MF	1990–1992	29	6	36	7	England under-21	—	
Jimmy Hindmarsh	HB	1913–1915	28	1	35	2	—	—	
Michael Robinson	FW	1979–1980	30	8	35	9	—	—	
Felipe Caicedo	FW	2008–2011	27	4	35	7	Ecuador	10	
Eric Garcia	DF	2017–2021	19	0	35	0	Spain	7	
David Weir	FW	1890–1893	32	10	34	13	England	0	
James Harper	FB	1895–1898	32	0	34	0	—	—	
Jack Milsom	FW	1938–1939	32	20	34	22	—	—	
Ian Scott	MF	1987–1989	24	3	34	4	—	—	
James McAtee	MF	2021–2025	18	3	34	7	England under-21	—	
John Wood	FW	1907–1909	28	6	33	9	—	—	
Harry Anders	FW	1953–1955	32	4	33	4	—	—	
Alf Wood	FW	1963–1966	32	4	33	4	England youth	—	
Michael Hughes	MF	1988–1992	26	1	33	1	Northern Ireland	4	
Joe Cassidy	FW	1900–1901	31	14	32	14	—	—	
Robert Davidson	FB	1902–1904	32	0	32	0	—	—	
Alex Steel	HB	1906–1907	30	1	32	1	—	—	
Charlie Burgess	FB	1908–1911	32	0	32	0	—	—	
Arthur Daniels	FW	1923–1926	31	1	32	1	—	—	
Jimmy Elwood	CH	1924–1927	31	0	32	0	Ireland	1	
Lee Croft	MF	2005–2006	28	1	32	1	England under-20	—	
Daniel Sturridge	FW	2007–2009	21	5	32	6	England	0	
Kalvin Phillips	MF	2022–	16	0	32	1	England	8	
John McVicker	FB	1892–1893	28	0	31	0	—	—	
Wally McReddie	FW	1894–1895	31	12	31	12	—	—	
John Wilkinson	HB	1907–1910	31	2	31	2	—	—	
Ronnie Turnbull	FW	1949–1950	30	5	31	5	—	—	
Jack Savage	GK	1954–1957	30	0	31	0	—	—	
Lucien Mettomo	DF	2001–2002	27	1	31	1	Cameroon	14	
Peter Schmeichel	GK	2002–2003	29	0	31	0	Denmark	0	
Benjani	FW	2008–2010	23	4	31	7	Zimbabwe	5	
Rayan Aït-Nouri	DF	2025–	17	0	31	0	Algeria	9	
David Oldfield	MF	1989–1990	26	6	30	9	England under-21	—	
William Hopkins	HB	1892–1893	28	0	29	0	—	—	
Paddy Kelly	FW	1920–1923	25	1	29	3	Ireland	1	
Trevor Francis	FW	1981–1982	26	12	29	14	England	10	
Mikhail Kavelashvili	FW	1996–1997	28	3	29	3	Georgia	2	
Bernardo Corradi	FW	2006–2008	25	3	29	3	Italy	0	
Émile Mpenza	FW	2007–2008	25	5	29	6	Belgium	2	
Costel Pantilimon	GK	2011–2014	7	0	29	0	Romania	3	
Nolito	FW	2016–2017	19	4	29	6	Spain		
Tommy Chapman	HB	1895–1896	26	3	28	3	Wales	2	
Jimmy Drummond	FW	1902–1903	28	5	28	5	—	—	
Geoff Lomax	DF	1983–1985	25	1	28	1	—	—	
Rae Ingram	DF	1995–1997	23	0	28	0	—	—	
Clifford Coupland	HB	1925–1926	24	2	27	2	—	—	
Bobby Owen	FW	1968–1969	22	3	27	6	—	—	
Paul Ritchie	DF	2000–2002	20	0	27	0	Scotland	0	
Antoine Semenyo	MF	2026–	17	7	27	11	Ghana	2	
Jimmy Whitehead	FW	1897–1898	24	7	26	7	England	0	
Willie Banks	HB	1905–1906	25	1	26	1	—	—	
Dick Crawshaw	FW	1919–1922	25	1	26	6	—	—	
Jackie Wharton	FW	1947–1948	23	2	26	2	—	—	
Phil Boyer	FW	1980–1982	20	3	26	4	England	0	
David Seaman	GK	2003–2004	19	0	26	0	England	0	
Ched Evans	FW	2007–2009	16	1	26	1	Wales	10	
Jack Pritchard	FW	1938–1946	22	5	25	5	—	—	
Jimmy Munro	FW	1948–1950	25	4	25	4	—	—	
Åge Hareide	DF	1981–1982	24	0	25	0	Norway	7	
Jason Beckford	FW	1988–1991	20	1	25	2	England youth	—	
John Foster	DF	1994–1996	19	0	25	0	England schoolboys	—	
Maurizio Gaudino	MF	1994–1995	20	3	25	4	Germany	0	
Gerry Creaney	FW	1995–1997	21	4	25	5	Scotland B	—	
Michael Frontzeck	DF	1996	23	0	25	0	Germany	0	
Tony Grant	MF	1999–2001	21	0	25	0	England under-21	—	
Jack Rodwell	MF	2012–2014	16	2	25	2	England	1	

== See also ==
- List of Manchester City F.C. players with fewer than 25 appearances
- List of Manchester City F.C. players with more than 100 appearances
  (Also includes winners of the Player of the Year award)
