= 1961–62 Cardiff City F.C. season =

Welsh football club season

Cardiff City
1961–62 season
- Manager: Bill Jones
- Football League First Division: 21st
- FA Cup: 3rd round
- League Cup: 3rd round
- Welsh Cup: Semi-finals
- Top goalscorer: League: Dai Ward (17); All: Dai Ward (21)
- Highest home attendance: 33,606 (v Tottenham Hotspur 13 January 1962)
- Lowest home attendance: 8,608 (v Birmingham City 21 April 1962)
- Average home league attendance: 19,294
Home colours

The 1961–62 season was Cardiff City F.C.'s 35th season in the Football League. They competed in the 22-team Division One, then the first tier of English football, finishing twenty-first, suffering relegation to Division Two. The 1961–62 season remained the last time Cardiff City appeared in the top tier of the English league system until promotion to Premier League after the 2012–13 season.

== Players ==
Note: Flags indicate national team as defined under FIFA eligibility rules; some limited exceptions apply. Players may hold more than one non-FIFA nationality.

No.	Pos.	Nation	Player
--	GK	WAL	Dilwyn John
--	GK	EIR	Maurice Swan
--	GK	WAL	Graham Vearncombe
--	DF	WAL	Colin Baker
--	DF	WAL	Mel Charles
--	DF	WAL	Trevor Edwards
--	DF	SCO	Alec Milne
--	DF	WAL	Frank Rankmore
--	DF	WAL	Peter Rodrigues
--	DF	WAL	Ron Stitfall
--	MF	WAL	Alan Durban
--	MF	WAL	Steve Gammon
--	MF	WAL	Alan Harrington
--	MF	ENG	Dave Holder

No.	Pos.	Nation	Player
--	MF	WAL	Barrie Hole
--	MF	ENG	Peter King
--	MF	WAL	Danny McCarthy
--	MF	WAL	Alan McIntosh
--	MF	WAL	Graham Moore
--	MF	WAL	Gil Reece
--	MF	ENG	Brian Walsh
--	MF	ENG	Gareth Williams
--	FW	ENG	Peter Donnelly
--	FW	ENG	Derek Hogg
--	FW	ENG	Johnny King
--	FW	WAL	Tony Pickrell
--	FW	WAL	Derek Tapscott
--	FW	WAL	Dai Ward

== League standings ==
Pos	Team	Pld	W	D	L	GF	GA	GAv	Pts	Qualification or relegation
18	Wolverhampton Wanderers	42	13	10	19	73	86	0.849	36	
19	Nottingham Forest	42	13	10	19	63	79	0.797	36	
20	Fulham	42	13	7	22	66	74	0.892	33	
21	Cardiff City (R)	42	9	14	19	50	81	0.617	32	Relegated to the Second Division
22	Chelsea (R)	42	9	10	23	63	94	0.670	28	Relegated to the Second Division

Source: World Football
Rules for classification: 1) Points; 2) Goal average; 3) Goals scored
(R) Relegated

=== Results by round ===
Round	1	2	3	4	5	6	7	8	9	10	11	12	13	14	15	16	17	18	19	20	21	22	23	24	25	26	27	28	29	30	31	32	33	34	35	36	37	38	39	40	41	42
Ground	A	H	H	A	A	H	H	H	A	A	H	A	H	A	H	A	H	A	H	A	H	H	A	H	H	A	A	H	A	H	A	H	A	H	A	H	A	A	H	H	A	A
Result	D	D	W	L	L	W	L	L	W	D	D	W	D	L	D	W	W	L	L	L	D	D	L	W	D	D	L	L	L	D	L	D	D	L	L	L	L	L	W	W	L	D
Position			7	9	15	8	12	15	11	12	10	10	9	13	12	8	7	8	12	14	14	15	17	12	14	13	16	17	19	20	20	20	20	20	20	20	21	21	21	21	21	21
Points	1	2	4	4	4	6	6	6	8	9	10	12	13	13	14	16	18	18	18	18	19	20	20	22	23	24	24	24	24	25	25	26	27	27	27	27	27	27	29	31	31	32

Source: Competitive matches
A = Away; H = Home; W = Win; D = Draw; L = Loss

== Fixtures and results ==
=== First Division ===
19 August 1961 1	Blackburn Rovers	0–0	Cardiff City	Blackburn
				Stadium: Ewood Park; Attendance: 18,428

23 August 1961 2	Cardiff City	1–1	Sheffield United	Cardiff
19:15	Johnny King		(pen.) Ron Simpson	Stadium: Ninian Park; Attendance: 24,662; Referee: Jim Finney (Hereford)

26 August 1961 3	Cardiff City	3–2	Blackpool	Cardiff
15:00	Dai Ward 5', 42'; Derek Hogg 49'		27' Des Horne; 61' Ray Charnley	Stadium: Ninian Park; Attendance: 22,701; Referee: Hugh Carr (Redditch)

28 August 1961 4	Sheffield United	1–0	Cardiff City	Sheffield
18:15	Len Allchurch			Stadium: Bramall Lane; Attendance: 19,193; Referee: Ken Seddon (Lancashire)

2 September 1961 5	Tottenham Hotspur	3–2	Cardiff City	London
15:00	Danny Blanchflower 51' (pen.); Cliff Jones 65'; Bobby Smith 89'		25' Johnny King; 48' Dai Ward	Stadium: White Hart Lane; Attendance: 37,834; Referee: Frank Cowen (Manchester)

6 September 1961 6	Cardiff City	5–2	Chelsea	Cardiff
19:15	Dai Ward 43'; Graham Moore 44'; Dai Ward 73'; Derek Tapscott 76'; John Mortimore 86' (o.g.)		20' Terry Venables; 70' Barry Bridges	Stadium: Ninian Park; Attendance: 20,853; Referee: William Clements (West Bromwich)

9 September 1961 7	Cardiff City	1–2	Bolton Wanderers	Cardiff
15:00	Dai Ward 60'		34' Doug Holden; 56' Billy McAdams	Stadium: Ninian Park; Attendance: 22,076; Referee: David Smith (Stonehouse)

16 September 1961 8	Cardiff City	1–2	Manchester United	Cardiff
15:15	Dai Ward 27'		22' (pen.) Albert Quixall; 58' Alex Dawson	Stadium: Ninian Park; Attendance: 29,251; Referee: Harold Horner (Coventry)

20 September 1961 9	Chelsea	2–3	Cardiff City	London
19:30	Mike Harrison 28'; Alec Milne 44' (o.g.)		9' Colin Baker; 43' Dai Ward; 47' Peter Donnelly	Stadium: Stamford Bridge; Attendance: 15,804; Referee: James A Cattlin (Rochdale)

23 September 1961 10	Wolverhampton Wanderers	1–1	Cardiff City	Wolverhampton
	Ted Farmer 3'	Wolves Complete History	30' Alan Harrington	Stadium: Molineux; Attendance: 26,643; Referee: Jim Pickles (Stockport)

30 September 1961 11	Cardiff City	2–2	Nottingham Forest	Cardiff
15:15	Dai Ward 51'; Johnny King 89'	Forest report	68' Dick Le Flem; 61' (o.g.) Colin Baker	Stadium: Ninian Park; Attendance: 20,502; Referee: Ken Burns (Stourbridge)

7 October 1961 12	Manchester City	1–2	Cardiff City	Manchester
15:00	Ray Sambrook 6'		21' Barrie Hole; 72' Johnny King	Stadium: Maine Road; Attendance: 20,143; Referee: Ken Burns (Stourbridge)

18 October 1961 13	Cardiff City	2–2	West Bromwich Albion	Cardiff
19:15	Alan Durban; Dai Ward		Stuart Williams; Keith Smith	Stadium: Ninian Park; Attendance: 16,819; Referee: Jack Sturgeon (Putney)

21 October 1961 14	Burnley	2–1	Cardiff City	Burnley
15:00	Gordon Harris 13'; Jimmy Robson 64'		59' Dai Ward	Stadium: Turf Moor; Attendance: 22,765; Referee: Dick Windle (Chesterfield)

28 October 1961 15	Cardiff City	1–1	Arsenal	Cardiff
15:15	Tony Pickrell 25'		9' Mel Charles	Stadium: Ninian Park; Attendance: 25,096; Referee: Al Jobling (Morecambe)

4 November 1961 16	Fulham	0–1	Cardiff City	London
14:30			21' Derek Tapscott	Stadium: Craven Cottage; Attendance: 20,077; Referee: Peter Brandwood (Kidderminster)

11 November 1961 17	Cardiff City	2–1	Sheffield Wednesday	Cardiff
15:15	Derek Tapscott 37', 78'		51' Johnny Fantham	Stadium: Ninian Park; Attendance: 17,987; Referee: Arthur Edge (Liverpool)

18 November 1961 18	Leicester City	3–0	Cardiff City	Leicester
	Colin Appleton 7'; Ken Keyworth 59'; Hughie McIlmoyle 87'			Stadium: Filbert Street; Attendance: 16,992; Referee: Eric Jennings (Stourbridge)

25 November 1961 19	Cardiff City	0–3	Ipswich Town	Cardiff
15:15			8', 86' Ted Phillips; 42' Doug Moran	Stadium: Ninian Park; Attendance: 22,823; Referee: John Kelly

2 December 1961 20	Birmingham City	3–0	Cardiff City	Birmingham
	Ken Leek 2', 29'; Mike Hellawell 70'			Stadium: St Andrew's; Attendance: 20,959; Referee: Les Hamer (Chorley)

9 December 1961 21	Cardiff City	0–0	Everton	Cardiff
15:15				Stadium: Ninian Park; Attendance: 15,782; Referee: Dick Windle (Chesterfield)

16 December 1961 22	Cardiff City	1–1	Blackburn Rovers	Cardiff
15:00	Graham Moore 43'		89' Ian Lawther	Stadium: Ninian Park; Attendance: 13,799; Referee: Jack Taylor (Wolverhampton)

23 December 1961 23	Blackpool	3–0	Cardiff City	Blackpool
14:45	Ray Parry 3', 41'; Ray Charnley 11'			Stadium: Bloomfield Road; Attendance: 13,961

26 December 1961 24	Cardiff City	1–0	Aston Villa	Cardiff
15:15	Derek Tapscott 67'			Stadium: Ninian Park; Attendance: 18,394; Referee: Ken Collinge (Altrincham)

13 January 1962 25	Cardiff City	1–1	Tottenham Hotspur	Cardiff
15:15	Johnny King 71' (pen.)		49' Dave Mackay	Stadium: Ninian Park; Attendance: 33,606; Referee: Jack Mitchell (Prescot)

20 January 1962 26	Bolton Wanderers	1–1	Cardiff City	Bolton
15:00	Dennis Stevens 72'		64' Dai Ward	Stadium: Burnden Park; Attendance: 11,231

3 February 1962 27	Manchester United	3–0	Cardiff City	Manchester
15:00	Nobby Stiles 2'; Johnny Giles 30'; Nobby Lawton 89'			Stadium: Old Trafford; Attendance: 29,200; Referee: Ken Aston (Ilford, Essex)

9 February 1962 28	Cardiff City	2–3	Wolverhampton Wanderers	Cardiff
19:15	Dai Ward 20'; Alec Milne 78'	Wolves Complete History	7' Peter McParland; 52', 75' Terry Wharton	Stadium: Ninian Park; Attendance: 18,372; Referee: Albert Atherton (Cheshire)

17 February 1962 29	Nottingham Forest	2–1	Cardiff City	Nottingham
15:00	Johnny Quigley 9'; David Pleat 29'	Forest report	42' Johnny King	Stadium: City Ground; Attendance: 19,227; Referee: Fred Stringer (Liverpool)

24 February 1962 30	Cardiff City	0–0	Manchester City	Cardiff
15:15				Stadium: Ninian Park; Attendance: 19,347; Referee: Denis Howell (Birmingham)

3 March 1962 31	West Bromwich Albion	5–1	Cardiff City	West Bromwich
15:00	Derek Kevan 6', 70'; Clive Clark 53'; Keith Smith 73'; Don Howe 85' (pen.)		37' Peter King	Stadium: The Hawthorns; Attendance: 13,894; Referee: Ken Seddon (Southport)

14 March 1962 32	Cardiff City	1–1	Burnley	Cardiff
19:15	Mel Charles 49'		46' Brian Miller	Stadium: Ninian Park; Attendance: 15,416; Referee: Len Mason (Aylesford)

17 March 1962 33	Arsenal	1–1	Cardiff City	London
15:00	Geoff Strong 85'		82' Dai Ward	Stadium: Highbury; Attendance: 25,059; Referee: Bill Clements (West Bromwich)

23 March 1962 34	Cardiff City	0–3	Fulham	Cardiff
19:15			Maurice Cook; Graham Leggat; Jackie Henderson	Stadium: Ninian Park; Attendance: 16,758; Referee: Arthur Jobling (Morecambe)

3 April 1962 35	Sheffield Wednesday	2–0	Cardiff City	Sheffield
19:15	Don Megson 25'; Johnny Fantham 47'			Stadium: Hillsborough; Attendance: 17,475

7 April 1962 36	Cardiff City	0–4	Leicester City	Cardiff
15:15			45', 49' Albert Cheesebrough; 79' Ken Keyworth; 89' Ian King	Stadium: Ninian Park; Attendance: 11,058; Referee: Frank Cowen (Manchester)

14 April 1962 37	Ipswich Town	1–0	Cardiff City	Ipswich
	Doug Moran 24'			Stadium: Portman Road; Attendance: 17,693; Referee: John Loynton (Solihull)

20 April 1962 38	West Ham United	4–1	Cardiff City	London
11:00	Colin Baker 15' (o.g.); Alan Sealey 53'; Ian Crawford 78'; Johnny Byrne 83'		Tony Pickrell	Stadium: Upton Park; Attendance: 24,459; Referee: Harold Horner (Coventry)

21 April 1962 39	Cardiff City	3–2	Birmingham City	Cardiff
15:15	Derek Tapscott 17', 19', 32'		35', 80' Ken Leek	Stadium: Ninian Park; Attendance: 8,608; Referee: Norman Hough (Macclesfield)

23 April 1962 40	Cardiff City	3–0	West Ham United	Cardiff
15:15	Dai Ward 5', 37'; Derek Tapscott 73'			Stadium: Ninian Park; Attendance: 11,274

28 April 1962 41	Everton	8–3	Cardiff City	Liverpool
15:00	Alex Young 9'; Derek Temple 17'; Roy Vernon 19', 76' (pen.), 83'; Dennis Stevens 49'; Billy Bingham 71'; Jimmy Gabriel 88'		16' Mel Charles; 44', 80' Tony Pickrell	Stadium: Goodison Park; Attendance: 31,186; Referee: Arthur Holland (Barnsley)

1 May 1962 42	Aston Villa	2–2	Cardiff City	Birmingham
19:15	Frank Rankmore 7' (o.g.); Derek Dougan 31'		5' Dai Ward; 17' Mel Charles	Stadium: Villa Park; Attendance: 22,174; Referee: John Kelly (Chorley)

=== League Cup ===
13 September 1961 Round 1	Cardiff City	2–0	Wrexham	Cardiff
19:15	Graham Moore 15'; Dai Ward 78'	Wrexham report		Stadium: Ninian Park; Attendance: 6,750; Referee: John Loynton (Solihull)

5 October 1961 Round 2	Mansfield Town	1–1	Cardiff City	Mansfield
19:15	Mike Stringfellow		Johnny King	Stadium: Field Mill; Attendance: 17,100; Referee: Hugh Carr (Redditch)

23 October 1961 Round 2 Replay	Cardiff City	2–1	Mansfield Town	Cardiff
19:00	Johnny King; Dai Ward		Ken Wagstaff	Stadium: Ninian Park; Attendance: 4,800

15 November 1961 Round 3	Bournemouth	3–0	Cardiff City	Bournemouth
19:30	Ray Bumstead; Dickie Dowsett; Billy Coxon			Stadium: Dean Court; Attendance: 12,857

=== FA Cup ===
10 January 1962 Round 3	Middlesbrough	1–0	Cardiff City	Middlesbrough
	Alan Peacock 55'			Stadium: Ayresome Park; Attendance: 29,013; Referee: NN Hough (Macclesfield_

=== Welsh Cup ===
24 January 1962 Round 5	Cardiff City	4–1	Newport County	Cardiff
19:15	Peter King; Alan Durban; Johnny King; Johnny King		Goal	Stadium: Ninian Park; Attendance: 5,715; Referee: Leo Callaghan (Merthyr Tydfil)

20 February 1962 Round 6	Bristol City	0–2	Cardiff City	Bristol
19:30			Dai Ward; Dai Ward	Stadium: Ashton Gate; Attendance: 13,579; Referee: RE Smith (Monmouth)

20 March 1962 Semi Final	Bangor City	2–0	Cardiff City	Wrexham
19:15	Goal			Stadium: The Racecourse; Attendance: 5,482

== See also ==
- Cardiff City F.C. seasons
