= William Banks =

William Banks may refer to:

- William Banks (alderman) (born 1949), alderman in Chicago
- William Banks (rugby) (1925–1991), Welsh rugby union and rugby league footballer of the 1940s and 1950s
- William Stott Banks (1820–1872), English antiquary
- William Banks (died 1676) (1636–1676), English politician
- William Banks (barrister) (1719–1761), English politician
- William Banks (cricketer) (1822–1901), Welsh-born English cricketer
- William Banks (footballer) (1893–1963), English footballer
- William V. Banks (1903–1985), radio station executive in Detroit
- William M. Banks (1915–1983), American flying ace
- William C. Banks (born 1948), American law professor
- William A. Banks (born 1954), American neuroimmunologist
- William Mitchell Banks (1842–1904), Scottish surgeon
- William E. Banks (Oklahoma politician)
- William E. Banks (Royal Navy officer)
- William Lawrence Banks, vice president of the Royal Horticultural Society

== See also ==
- Willie Banks (disambiguation)
- Billy Banks (disambiguation)
- William Bankes (disambiguation)
