= Bankes =

Bankes may refer to

- Bankes (surname)
- Bankes Coffee Stores, a chain of stores operated in Chicago area in the U.S. in the early 20th century
- Bankes's Horse, (c.1586–c.1606), English performing horse

== See also ==
- Banks (disambiguation)
