= Bankes (surname) =

Bankes is an English surname that may refer to the following people:

- Bankes family of prominent gentry in Dorset, England
- Anne Bankes (1759–1778), English pastellist
- Charlotte Bankes (born 1995), British-French snowboarder
- Edward Bankes, Irish-born American entrepreneur, founder of Bankes Coffee Stores
- John Eldon Bankes (1854–1946), Welsh judge
- Lyn Bankes (born 1941), American politician
- Peter Bankes (born 1982), English football referee
- William Bankes (disambiguation), multiple people

== See also ==
- Banks (surname)
