= Fastest goals in association football =

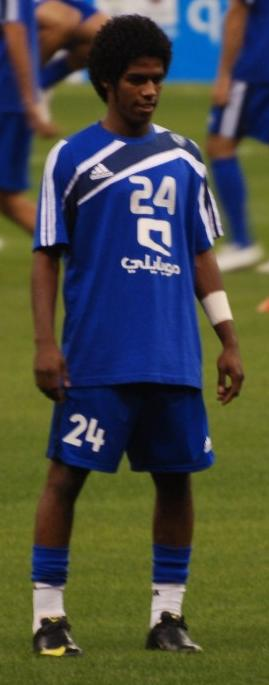
Nawaf Al-Abed

This article lists goals which have been considered among the fastest ever scored in association football matches. The records concerning the fastest goals are disputed for a number of reasons. Ray Spiller of the Association of Football Statisticians has argued that as there is no official system for recognizing the timing of goals, and so, there will be and always are going to be disputes concerning these records.

In addition, many of the goals listed in the Guinness World Records as being among the fastest were not filmed, preventing the precise timing of goals from being assessed. The status of Nawaf Al-Abed's goal which is credited as being scored after two seconds is also disputed given that the match was later declared void due to ineligible players, when several players over the age of 23 were found to have played in the age restricted game.

Marc Burrows' goal has also been considered the fastest ever but it was scored in an amateur reserve game. As there is no standard size for a football pitch some of the goals listed benefit from being played on smaller pitches that require the ball to travel a shorter distance before reaching the goal. Furthermore, many of the records listed come from English language publications and reflect a bias towards English football within the sources.

Under The Laws of the Game, specifically Law 8, goals may be scored directly from the kick-off. Some of the fastest goals on the list below are shots taken directly from kick-off.

== Goals ==
The following is a list of goals scored by any kind of players, including youths, amateurs, semi-professionals, or professionals, in any football league, cup or other competition around the world, below 11 seconds since the ball was in play.

| Position | Player | Year | Match | Result | Time | Ref. | Notes |
|---|---|---|---|---|---|---|---|
| 1 | Gavin Stokes | 2017 | Maryhill v Clydebank | 3–0 | 2.1 sec | | This match was a non-league (junior) match involving two teams from the West of Scotland Super League First Division in Scottish football. Distance from the halfway line was approximately 46 metres. |
| 2 | Ryan Hall | 2024 | Croydon v Cockfosters Reserves | 3–0 | 2.4 sec | | This was a cup semi-final in the London Senior Trophy. |
| 3 | Marc Burrows | 2004 | Cowes Sports Reserves v Eastleigh Reserves | 5–3 | 2.56 sec | | This match was an amateur match but the record has been recognised by The Football Association. Eye-witness reports state the goal was aided by a particularly strong following wind. |
| 4 | Dean Sherwood | 2026 | AFC Uckfield Town v Worthing United | 3–3 | 2.67 sec | | This was a match in the Southern Combination Football League Division One, the tenth tier of English football. |
| 5 | Cheung Sai Ho | 1993 | Portsmouth Cup | | 2.8 sec | | Cheung scored for the Hong Kong youth team 2.8 seconds after the start of a match in the Portsmouth Cup in 1993. It was the world record in 1993. |
| 5 | Ricardo Olivera | 1998 | Rio Negro Capital v Soriano Interior | 1–1 | 2.8 sec | | The goal was listed in the Guinness World Records prior to 2004. |
| 7 | Carlos Almeida | 2011 | Oliveira do Hospital v Associação Atlética de Arganil | 3–0 | 3 sec | | Occurred during a match in the first tier of Coimbra Football Association, the fourth tier of Portuguese football. |
| 7 | Megan Searson | 2016 | UoMA Maurauders v Minnesota Crookstown | 2–0 | 3 sec | | Fastest goal scored by a female player, occurred during a match in the NCAA. |
| 9 | Fred | 2003 | América Mineiro v Vila Nova | 1–5 | 3.17 sec | | Fastest goal ever scored in Brazilian football. |
| 10 | Vuk Bakic | 2012 | GSP Polet v FK Dorćol | 4–1 | 3.24 sec | | This match was a junior match of the Serbian 2. League. Immediately after the referee whistled the beginning of the meeting, Vuk Bakic sent the ball into the goal. Distance from the centre and goal was approximately 50 metres. |
| 11 | Colin Cowperthwaite | 1979 | Barrow v Kettering Town | 4–0 | 3.55 sec | | Believed to be the fastest goal in association football at the time. |
| 12 | Richard Wetton | 2017 | Oakwood v Lingfield | 2–6 | 3.57 sec | | Also the fastest second goal scored in a match, coming in 40 seconds. |
| 13 | Bart van der Veer | 2014 | LTC v Oeverzwaluwen | 2–4 | 3.6 sec | | Occurred during a match in the Saturdays 1e Klasse, the fifth tier of Dutch football and the third tier of Dutch amateur football. It was Van der Veer's last match for Oeverzwaluwen before his retirement. |
| 14 | Crios O'Hare | 2025 | Marlin Coast Rangers v Stratford Dolphins | 5–0 | 3.68 sec | | Fastest goal ever scored in Australian soccer. Occurred from the kick-off of a match in the Australia Cup, the national cup competition of the Australian soccer league system. |
| 15 | Damian Mori | 1995 | Adelaide City v Sydney United | 2–2 | 3.69 sec | | According to the Guinness Book of Records, Mori held the record from 1995 to 1998 when Ricardo Olivera scored a goal in 2.8 sec. |
| 16 | Gioacchino Giardina | 2023 | Mazarese vs Nissa | 2–1 | 3.81 sec | | Eccellenza Sicily league game. Fastest goal in Italian football history. |
| 17 | Yael Averbuch | 2006 | North Carolina v Yale Bulldogs | 4–0 | 3.9 sec | | Goal occurred in a women's college football match. |
| 18 | Jim Fryatt | 1964 | Bradford Park Avenue v Tranmere | 4–2 | 4 sec | | According to the sources some onlookers say that this goal took closer to 10 seconds. However, there is no film evidence to contradict the assessment of the referee Bob Simons who said: "I blew my whistle for the start and still had my stopwatch in my hand when the ball entered the net. The scoring time is exactly four seconds – no question of it." |
| 18 | Gareth Morris | 2001 | Ashton United v Skelmersdale United | 4–2 | 4 sec | | This goal is likely to be the fastest ever scored in the FA Cup, although the lack of records dating back to the formation of the competition make this impossible to verify. |
| 18 | Roman Voynarovskyi | 2008 | Krymteplytsia v Feniks-Illichovets | 2–2 | 4 sec | | Scored in the First League (2nd tier of Ukrainian football). Fastest goal ever scored in Ukrainian professional football. |
| 18 | Gustavo Ramírez | 2014 | Mineros de Zacatecas v Club Necaxa | 2–0 | 4 sec | | Goal occurred in the first match of the season in Ascenso MX. |
| 18 | Osagie Osayande | 2024 | AC Libertas v SS Pennarossa | 2–2 | 4 sec | | Goal occurred in Campionato Sammarinese di Calcio. |
| 23 | Hadi Abdollahzadeh | 1999 | Aboomoslem v Irsotter Noshahr | 2–0 | 4.09 sec | | Fastest goal ever scored in Iranian Football. |
| 24 | Maria McAneny | 2025 | Hibernian v Celtic | 1–2 | 4.1 sec | | Fastest goal ever in the Scottish Women's Premier League. |
| 25 | Malcolm Macdonald | 1972 | St Johnstone v Newcastle United | 3–7 | 5 sec | | Fastest goal ever scored in Newcastle United's history. Believed to be the fastest association football goal in history at the time. |
| 25 | Carlos Dantón Seppaquercia | 1979 | Gimnasia y Esgrima LP v Huracán | 1–1 | 5 sec | | Fastest goal ever scored in the Argentine Primera División. |
| 27 | Albert Mundy | 1958 | Aldershot Town v Hartlepool United | 3–0 | 6 sec | | Believed to be fastest goal in association football at the time. |
| 27 | Barrie Jones | 1962 | Notts County v Torquay United | 2–0 | 6 sec | | |
| 27 | Keith Smith | 1964 | Crystal Palace v Derby County | 3–3 | 6 sec | | |
| 27 | Félix Suárez | 1976 | Alianza Lima v Independiente Santa Fe | 4–0 | 6 sec | | Fastest goal ever scored in the Copa Libertadores. |
| 27 | Tommy Langley | 1980 | QPR v Bolton Wanderers | 3–1 | 6 sec | | |
| 27 | Alexandros Zafeiris | 1980 | Irodotos v Kifisia | 3–1 | 6 sec | | Fastest goal scored in the third tier of Greek Football League 2. |
| 27 | Kevin Noschang | 2008 | Indiana Hoosiers vs Kentucky Wildcats | 1-1 | 6 sec | | Fastest goal in men's NCAA history along with IU program. |
| 27 | Ghazi Ayadi | 2017 | Club Africain v CS Sfaxien | 2–1 | 6 sec | | Fastest goal ever scored in the Tunisian Super Ligue. |
| 27 | Christoph Baumgartner | 2024 | Austria v Slovakia | 2–0 | 6 sec | | Fastest goal ever scored in an international match. |
| 35 | Rafael Leão | 2020 | Sassuolo v AC Milan | 1–2 | 6.2 sec | | Fastest goal ever scored in the Italian Serie A. |
| 35 | Dylan Allen-Hadley | 2025 | Lowestoft Town V Alvechurch | 0–4 | 6.2 sec | | Scored during a semi-professional game in the Southern Football League Premier Central Division. Lowestoft had kickoff but Alvechurch Scored |
| 37 | Migen Memelli | 2009 | Tirana v Flamurtari Vlorë | 3–0 | 7 sec | | Fastest goal ever scored in the Albanian Superliga. |
| 37 | Ji Xiang | 2012 | Jiangsu Sainty v Guangzhou Evergrande | 1–1 | 7 sec | | Fastest goal ever scored in the Chinese Super League. |
| 37 | Andreas Labropoulos | 2013 | Olympiacos v OFI | 5–1 | 7 sec | | Fastest goal ever scored in the Super League Greece. |
| 37 | Lukas Podolski | 2013 | Germany v Ecuador | 4–2 | 7 sec | | |
| 37 | Jerome Martelli | 2014 | Leyton Uv Dagenham & Redbridge U18 | 4–1 | 7 sec | | Fastest goal ever scored in an U18 Association football game. |
| 37 | Mike Grella | 2015 | New York Red Bulls v Philadelphia Union | 4–1 | 7 sec | | Fastest goal ever scored in Major League Soccer . |
| 37 | Florian Wirtz | 2024 | Germany v France | 2–0 | 7 sec | | |
| 37 | Robin Fellhauer | 2026 | FC Ausburg v FC Bayern Munich | 2-2 | 7 sec | | Fastest goal ever scored in Bundesliga. |
| 44 | Alfie Lloyd | 2023 | Eastleigh v Dorking Wanderers | 4–0 | 7.12 sec | | |
| 45 | Joseba Llorente | 2008 | Valladolid v Espanyol | 2–1 | 7.22 sec | | Fastest goal ever scored in La Liga. |
| 46 | Roman Yaremchuk | 2016 | Vorskla Poltava v Oleksandriya | 2–2 | 7.27 sec | | Fastest goal ever scored in the Ukrainian Premier League. |
| 47 | Carlos Aguiar | 2010 | Huachipato v Universidad de Chile | 1–2 | 7.3 sec | | Fastest goal ever scored in the Chilean Primera División. |
| 48 | Miroslav Manolov | 2012 | Cherno More Varna v Montana | 3–1 | 7.42 sec | | Fastest goal ever scored in Bulgarian A Football Group. |
| 49 | Seydou Keita | 2014 | Valencia v Almería | 2–2 | 7.66 sec | | |
| 50 | Shane Long | 2019 | Watford v Southampton | 1–1 | 7.69 sec | | Fastest goal ever scored in the Premier League. |
| 51 | Freddy Eastwood | 2004 | Southend United v Swansea City | 4–2 | 7.7 sec | | Fastest ever debut goal. |
| 52 | Nick Barmby | 2004 | Hull City v Walsall | 3–1 | 7.8 sec | | Fastest goal ever scored in the English League One. |
| 53 | Michel Rio | 1992 | Caen v Cannes | 3–1 | 7.9 sec | | Fastest goal ever scored in the French Ligue 1. |
| 54 | Nivaldo | 1989 | Náutico v Atlético Mineiro | 3–2 | 8 sec | | Fastest goal ever scored at the Campeonato Brasileiro Série A. |
| 54 | Tim Cahill | 2013 | Houston Dynamo v New York Red Bulls | 0–3 | 8 sec | | Second-fastest goal ever scored in Major League Soccer. |
| 54 | Zaur Sadayev | 2014 | Lech Poznań v Jagiellonia Białystok | 4–2 | 8 sec | | Fastest goal ever scored in Polish Cup. |
| 54 | Tom Morgan | 2014 | Turton v Lytham | 4–1 | 8 sec | | |
| 54 | Marco Tavares | 2017 | Maribor v Domžale | 1–0 | 8 sec | | Fastest goal ever scored in Slovenian FirstLeague. |
| 54 | Vito van Crooij | 2022 | Sparta Rotterdam v AZ Alkmaar | 2–3 | 8 sec | | Fastest goal ever scored in the Dutch Eredivisie. |
| 60 | Paolo Poggi | 2001 | Piacenza v Fiorentina | 3–1 | 8.1 sec | | Second-fastest goal ever scored in the Italian Serie A. |
| 60 | Christian Benteke | 2016 | Gibraltar v Belgium | 0–6 | 8.1 sec | | Fastest goal ever scored in a FIFA World Cup qualification game. |
| 62 | Davide Gualtieri | 1993 | San Marino v England | 1–7 | 8.3 sec | | Second-fastest goal ever scored in a FIFA World Cup qualification game. |
| 62 | Kylian Mbappé | 2022 | Lille v Paris SG | 1–7 | 8.3 sec | | Second-fastest goal ever scored in French Ligue 1 |
| 63 | Hisato Satō | 2006 | Sanfrecce Hiroshima v Cerezo Osaka | 1–1 | 8.7 sec | | Fastest goal ever scored in J1 League. |
| 64 | Amine Azri | 2024 | Nahdat Zemamra v Maghreb Fez | 1–0 | 9 sec | | Fastest goal ever scored in the Botola Pro |
| 64 | Gildo | 1965 | Palmeiras v Vasco da Gama | 4–1 | 9 sec | | Fastest goal ever scored at the Maracanã stadium in Brazil. |
| 64 | Sebastián Soria | 2013 | Pakhtakor v Lekhwiya | 2–2 | 9 sec | | Fastest goal ever scored in the AFC Champions League. |
| 64 | Karim Bellarabi | 2014 | Borussia Dortmund v Bayer Leverkusen | 0–2 | 9 sec | | Joint-second-fastest goal scored in the history of the German Bundesliga. |
| 64 | Kevin Volland | 2015 | 1899 Hoffenheim v Bayern Munich | 1–2 | 9 sec | | Joint-second-fastest goal scored in the history of the German Bundesliga. |
| 64 | Godwin Mensha | 2023 | Malavan v Mes Rafsanjan | 0–4 | 9 sec | | fastest goal ever scored in the Persian Gulf Pro League. |
| 72 | Philip Billing | 2023 | Arsenal v AFC Bournemouth | 3–2 | 9.11 sec | | |
| 73 | Yakou Méïté | 2020 | Blackburn Rovers v Reading | 2–4 | 9.55 sec | | |
| 74 | Amadou Sagna | 2019 | Senegal v Tahiti | 3–0 | 9.6 sec | | Fastest goal ever scored at the FIFA U-20 World Cup. |
| 75 | Ledley King | 2000 | Tottenham Hotspur v Bradford City | 3–3 | 9.9 sec | | Second-fastest goal ever scored in the Premier League. |
| 76 | Ben Smith | 2006 | Tamworth v Weymouth | 1–3 | 10 sec | | |
| 76 | Gjergji Muzaka | 2006 | Partizani Tirana v Apolonia Fier | 2–0 | 10 sec | | |
| 76 | Justin Meram | 2015 | Columbus Crew v New York Red Bulls | 2–0 | 10 sec | | Fastest ever goal in MLS postseason. |
| 76 | Uroš Đurđević | 2016 | Čukarički v Partizan | 1–3 | 10 sec | | Fastest goal scored in the history of the Serbian SuperLiga. |
| 76 | Julian Kristoffersen | 2016 | FC Copenhagen U19 v Leicester City U19 | 3–2 | 10 sec | | UEFA Youth League |
| 76 | Paul Onuachu | 2019 | Nigeria v Egypt | 1–0 | 10 sec | | |
| 82 | Roy Makaay | 2007 | Bayern Munich v Real Madrid | 2–1 | 10.12 sec | | Fastest goal in UEFA Champions League |
| 83 | Jacopo Segre | 2026 | Palermo v Spezia | 1–0 | 10.2 sec | | Fastest goal ever scored in the Italian serie B. |
| 84 | Gholamreza Rezaei | 2012 | Fajr Sepasi v Persepolis | 0–2 | 10.68 sec | | Second-fastest goal ever scored in the Persian Gulf Pro League. |
| 85 | Hakan Şükür | 2002 | South Korea v Turkey | 0–1 | 10.8 sec | | Fastest goal in a FIFA World Cup match |

== See also ==
- List of world association football records
