= Eric Williamson =

Eric Williamson may refer to:

- Eryk Williamson (born 1997), American soccer player
- Eric Miles Williamson (born 1961), American novelist and literary critic

== See also ==
- Eric Williams (disambiguation)
