= Daniel Whittle =

Daniel Whittle may refer to:

- Daniel Webster Whittle (1840-1901) American gospel song lyricist
- Danny Whittle (1874-1909), English footballer, see List of Manchester City F.C. players (25–99 appearances)
