= Eric Williams (disambiguation) =

Eric Williams (1911–1981) was the Prime Minister of Trinidad and Tobago.

Eric or Erik Williams may also refer to:

== Arts and entertainment ==
- Eric Williams (writer) (1911–1983), English author; former inmate of Stalag Luft III and writer of The Wooden Horse
- Eric Williams (singer) (born 1960), member of the R&B group Blackstreet
- Eric Bransby Williams (1900–1994), British actor
- Eric C. Williams (1918–2010), British science fiction author
- Eric Lloyd Williams (1915–1988), South African-born journalist and war correspondent
- Eric Kostiuk Williams (born 1990), cartoonist and illustrator
- Eric R. Williams, professor and new media storyteller
- Grim Reaper (Marvel Comics), the Marvel Comics supervillain, whose real name is Eric Williams

== Sports ==
=== American football ===
- Erik Williams (born 1968), American offensive tackle
- Eric Williams (defensive lineman) (born 1962), American defensive tackle
- Eric Williams (linebacker) (born 1955), American
- Eric Williams (safety) (born 1960), American

=== Other sports ===
- Eric Williams (basketball, born 1972), American former basketball player in the National Basketball Association
- Eric Williams (basketball, born 1984), American-Bulgarian basketball player
- Eric Williams (footballer) (1921–2001), English footballer
- Eric Williams (football coach), English football manager
- Eric Williams (motorcyclist) (1893–1963), British pioneer of motor cycle racing
- Eric Williams (swimmer) (born 1977), Nigerian
- Eric Williams (speedway rider) (1927–2009), Welsh speedway rider

== Others ==
- Eric A. Williams (born 1957), Trinidad and Tobago politician
- Eric Lyle Williams (born 1967), American lawyer and judge, convicted in the 2013 Kaufman County murders case in Texas

== See also ==
- Eric Williamson (disambiguation)
