= Willie Banks (disambiguation) =

Willie Banks (born 1956) is an American track and field athlete.

Willie Banks may also refer to:

- Willie Banks (baseball) (born 1969), American baseball pitcher
- Willie Banks (American football) (1946–1989), American football offensive lineman
- Willie Banks (musician) (1929–1993), American musician
- Willie Banks (footballer) (1880–?), Scottish footballer

== See also ==
- William Banks (disambiguation)
