= Frank Middleton (footballer) =

English footballer

Personal information
- Full name: Francis Middleton
- Date of birth: 6 June 1879
- Place of birth: Whitwick, England
- Date of death: 1943 (aged 70–71)
- Position: Winger

Senior career*
Years	Team	Apps	(Gls)
1896–1901	Whitwick White Cross		
1901–1906	Derby County	65	(3)
1906–1908	Leicester Fosse	49	(10)
1909	Whitwick Imperial		
Total		114	(13)
- * Club domestic league appearances and goals

Francis Middleton (6 June 1879 – 1943) was an English footballer who played in the Football League for Derby County and Leicester Fosse.
