= Billy Banks =

Billy Banks is the name of:

- Billy Banks (rugby) (1925–1991), Welsh rugby league footballer
- Billy Banks (singer) (c. 1908–1967), American jazz singer

== See also ==
- Willie Banks (born 1956), American athlete
- William Banks (disambiguation)
