= Jimmy Long (footballer) =

Scottish footballer

Personal information
- Full name: James Long
- Date of birth: 1880
- Place of birth: Glasgow, Scotland
- Position: Inside forward

Senior career*
Years	Team	Apps	(Gls)
1898–1902	Clyde		
1902–1904	Grimsby Town	57	(13)
1904–1906	Reading		
1906–1908	Derby County	61	(18)
- * Club domestic league appearances and goals

James Long (1880 – after 1907) was a Scottish professional footballer who played as an inside forward.
