= Luis Aguiar =

Uruguayan footballer (born 1985)

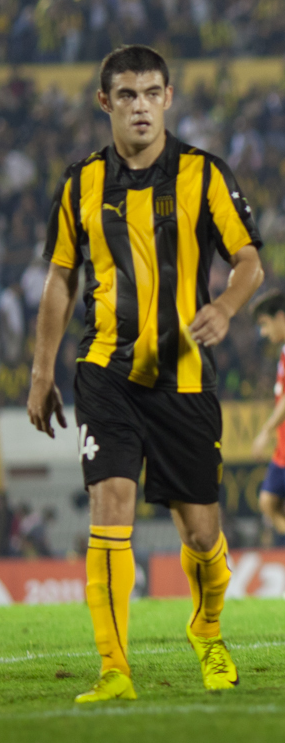
- Aguiar playing for Peñarol in 2011

Personal information
- Full name: Luis Bernardo Aguiar Burgos
- Date of birth: 17 November 1985 (age 40)
- Place of birth: Mercedes, Uruguay
- Height: 1.82 m (6 ft 0 in)
- Position: Attacking midfielder

Senior career*
Years	Team	Apps	(Gls)
2003–2007	Liverpool Montevideo	77	(15)
2006	→ Universidad Concepción (loan)	27	(9)
2007–2008	Porto	0	(0)
2007	→ Estrela Amadora (loan)	7	(0)
2008	→ Académica (loan)	12	(1)
2008–2009	Braga	28	(4)
2009–2011	Dynamo Moscow	14	(2)
2010	→ Braga (loan)	14	(3)
2010–2011	→ Braga (loan)	12	(2)
2011	→ Peñarol (loan)	11	(2)
2011–2012	Sporting CP	0	(0)
2011–2012	→ Peñarol (loan)	25	(8)
2012–2013	San Lorenzo	14	(3)
2013–2016	Peñarol	63	(19)
2014	→ Vitória (loan)	10	(0)
2016	Braga	0	(0)
2017	Alianza Lima	39	(15)
2018	Nacional	21	(5)
2019	Plaza Colonia	7	(1)
2019	San Martín Tucumán	7	(1)
2020	Alianza Lima	6	(0)
2020–2021	Juventud	31	(12)
2022	Deportivo Maldonado	8	(1)
2023	Oriental	16	(2)
Total		449	(105)

International career
2005	Uruguay U20	12	(0)
- * Club domestic league appearances and goals

Luis Bernardo Aguiar Burgos (born 17 November 1985) is a Uruguayan former professional footballer who played as an attacking midfielder.

== Club career ==
Born in Mercedes, Soriano Department, Aguiar started his career with Liverpool FC Montevideo. After an impressive season he transferred to FC Porto of Portugal but, after only two months with the club, not being able to reach the first team, he was loaned out during that season to C.F. Estrela da Amadora and Académica de Coimbra.

On 11 April 2008, Aguiar scored in a 3–0 surprise win for Académica against S.L. Benfica. His very first goal in the Primeira Liga proved crucial for the Coimbra side, which finally narrowly avoided relegation as 12th.

Aguiar remained in Portugal in June 2008, signing with rising S.C. Braga. He was essential in helping the Minho team win 11 of their first 15 competitive matches, netting on five occasions; on 23 October 2008, he scored from a free kick in another 3–0 upset, this time against England's Portsmouth in the group stage of the UEFA Cup.

After having been a permanent presence in Braga's qualification for the Europa League, Aguiar moved to FC Dynamo Moscow in Russia, for €2.5 million. However, only a few months afterwards, he returned to league leaders – eventually finished second – Braga, on loan until June, eventually surpassing Hugo Viana in the pecking order at central midfielder. He returned to Dynamo after his loan expired, only to re-sign with the Portuguese the following month also on loan.

Aguiar started the 2010–11 campaign again in the starting XI, still under manager Domingos Paciência. However, he would ironically lose his place to Viana, and left in early January 2011, returning to his country after a lengthy absence and joining Peñarol, still owned by Dynamo Moscow.

On 5 July 2011, Aguiar was sold by Dynamo Moscow to Sporting CP, signing a four-year contract with the Lisbon club and reuniting with former Braga boss Paciência. However, in late September, without having made any official appearances, he returned to Peñarol, again on loan.

On 27 July 2012, Aguiar moved to Argentine Primera División side San Lorenzo de Almagro on a two-year deal. He subsequently returned to Peñarol for a further three Uruguayan Primera División seasons during which he was involved in several incidents, being loaned to Brazil's Esporte Clube Vitória in 2014.

Aguiar returned to Braga for a fourth spell on 29 June 2016, becoming newly appointed manager José Peseiro's first signing. He terminated his contract in November, after only three minutes of competitive play.

In the following seasons, Aguiar represented in quick succession Alianza Lima (Peruvian Primera División) and Club Nacional de Football. On 3 January 2018, due to the transfer to the latter club, he received threats on social media; later in the same year, he was released.

On 11 February 2019, Aguiar joined Club Plaza Colonia de Deportes. Only three months later, he left for personal reasons.

== Personal life ==
Aguiar's older brother, Carlos, was also a footballer and a midfielder.
