= Andy Gardner (footballer, born 1877) =

Scottish footballer

Personal information
- Date of birth: 17 April 1877
- Place of birth: Oban, Scotland
- Height: 5 ft 8 in (1.73 m)
- Position: Outside left

Senior career*
Years	Team	Apps	(Gls)
–	Kilbarchan Victoria		
–	Kilbarchan		
1895–1901	Clyde		
1901–1902	Grimsby Town	31	(4)
1902–1903	Newcastle United	9	(3)
1903–1904	Bolton Wanderers	8	(1)
1904–1905	Brighton & Hove Albion	23	(10)
1905–1906	Queens Park Rangers	5	(0)
190?–1908	Carlisle United		
1908–1909	Johnstone		
1909–19??	Carlisle United		
- * Club domestic league appearances and goals

Andrew Gardner (17 April 1877 – after 1908) was a Scottish professional footballer who made 48 appearances in the English Football League playing as an outside left for Grimsby Town, Newcastle United and Bolton Wanderers. He also played for Scottish League club Clyde and for Southern League clubs Brighton & Hove Albion, where he was top scorer in 1904–05 with 13 goals in all competitions, and Queens Park Rangers. Gardner was born in Oban, Scotland.
