= Harriet Woodley =

British artist (1766–1844)

Harriet Woodley, later Pickard (1766–1844) was an English amateur artist.

Woodley was the daughter of politician William Woodley and his wife Ann. In 1788 she married Thomas Pickard (1755–1830) of Bloxworth House, Dorset; her sister Frances (1760–1823), meanwhile, married Henry Bankes of Kingston Lacy, where there is a group portrait by Johann Zoffany depicting the girls with their parents. Harriet was an amateur pastellist, and appears to have taught her sister-in-law Anne Bankes the medium as well. Today a half-dozen copies by her of work by William Hoare, Jean-Baptiste Greuze, and Sir Joshua Reynolds may be seen at Kingston Lacy; their date is unknown. Mrs. Pickard died in Bath, Somerset.
