= Anne Bankes =

British artist (1759–1778)

Anne Bankes (1759–1778) was an English pastellist.

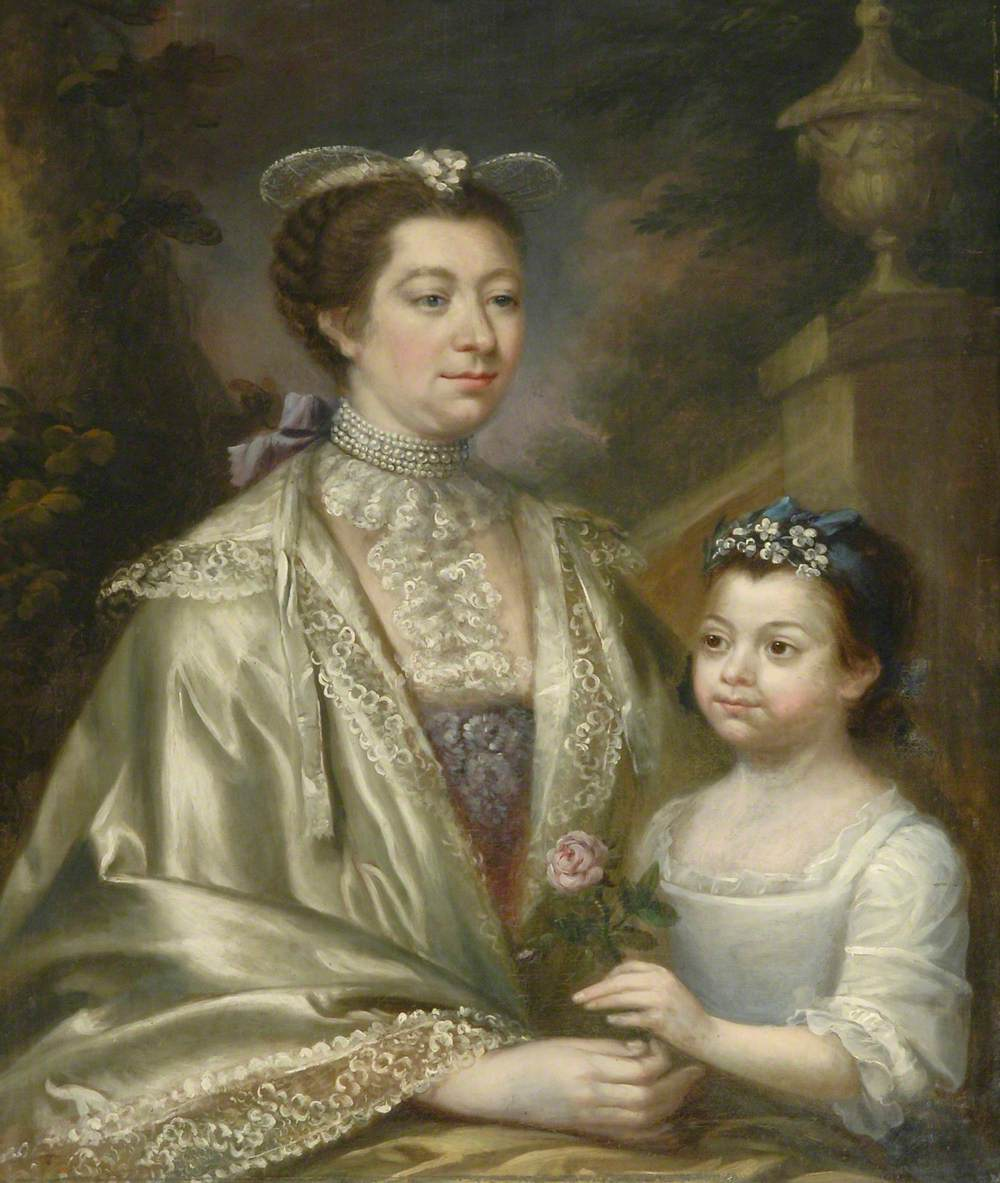
Margaret Wynne (1724–1822), Mrs Henry Bankes II, and Her Daughter Anne Bankes (1759–1778), as a Child, Richard Roper, 1764

Born in Dorset, Bankes was the sister of Henry Bankes of Kingston Lacy. It is thought that she was taught the art of pastel by Harriet Woodley. An oil portrait of her with her mother, painted by Richard Roper, still exists in the collection at Kingston Lacy. It has been suggested that Bankes may be confused with her niece, Anne Frances Banks (1790–1864), later in life the wife of Edward Boscawen. A pastel of The Calling of Samuel, derived from a work by Joshua Reynolds, is held at Kingston Lacy.
