= Eric Miles Williamson =

American novelist

- Born: June 20, 1961 (age 65); Sacramento, California, U.S.
- Occupations: Novelist; short story writer; literary critic; professor; editor

Eric Miles Williamson (born June 20, 1961) is an American novelist and literary critic, former member of the Board of Directors of the National Book Critics Circle, and former editor of American Book Review, Boulevard, and Texas Review. Williamson is currently Professor of Creative Writing at the University of Texas Rio Grande Valley and was previously an associate professor of English at the Central Missouri State University.

== East Bay Grease ==
A former student of the fiction writer Donald Barthelme, Williamson has met critical success as a novelist. On his book, East Bay Grease, a journalist at the New York Times wrote, the "prose cuts loose in torrid rhythms that evoke the peril and exuberance of jazz." His style in this book has also led the work to be called "an internal combustion novel."

== Personal life ==
Williamson is a 1979 graduate of Pacific High School in San Leandro, California, and played trumpet in its jazz band. In East Bay Grease, he gives the real names of many of the members of that band, although the novel places them in a fictional junior high school. He lives in McAllen, Texas with his son, Turner.

== Selected bibliography ==
=== Books ===
- East Bay Grease. Picador USA/St. Martin's Press, 1999. Hardcover. ISBN 0-312-19861-2
- Two-Up. Texas Review Press, 2006. Hardcover and paperback. ISBN 1-881515-75-3
- Oakland, Jack London, and Me. Texas Review Press, 2007. Paperback. ISBN 1-933896-11-6
- Welcome to Oakland. Raw Dog Screaming Press, 2009. Hardcover and paperback. ISBN 978-1-933293-80-6
- Say It Hot: Essays on American Writers Living, Dying, and Dead. Texas Review Press, 2011. ISBN 978-1-933896-38-0
- 14 Fictional Positions. Raw Dogs Screaming Press, 2011.
- Say It Hot, Volume II: Industrial Strength Essays on American Writers. Texas Review Press, 2015. ISBN 978-1-68003-002-0
- Boning The Muse: Letters To Steve (Down & Out Books) ISBN 978-1643960661

=== Short fiction ===
- "The Case of Blaise" [an excerpt from novel, Pay the Boy]. Pale House. Los Angeles.
- "Two-Up" [an excerpt from novel, Two-Up]. Pale House Press Anthology. Los Angeles. 2005.
- "Pay the Boy" [an excerpt from the novel, Pay the Boy]. The Texas Review. San Houston State University. Fall 2004.
- "On Thin Ice." Kansas City Star Magazine. December 2003.
- "Our Women and Why We Love Them so Much" [an excerpt from the novel, Pay the Boy]. Boulevard. St. Louis University. Spring 2003. Special Mention Pushcart Prize Anthology 2004.
- "The Teachings of Don B." The Texas Review. Sam Houston University. Spring 2003.
- "Scow" [an excerpt from the novel, Pay the Boy]. The Chattahoochee Review. Georgia Perimeter College. Summer 2002.
- "The Cow Island Open." The Arkansas Review. Arkansas State University. Spring 2002.
- "Urban Renewal" [and excerpt from the novel, Pay the Boy]. Boulevard. St. Louis University. Fall 2001. Special Mention Pushcart Prize Anthology 2002.
- "Creusa" [an excerpt from the novel, Two-Up]. Gulf Coast. University of Houston. Spring 2000.
