= William Wallace (footballer, born 1893) =

English footballer

Personal information
- Full name: William Wallace
- Date of birth: 1893
- Place of birth: Blaydon-on-Tyne, England
- Date of death: 8 November 1917 (aged 23–24)
- Place of death: Passchendaele salient, Belgium
- Position: Outside left

Senior career*
Years	Team	Apps	(Gls)
–1911	Newburn		
1911–1914	Manchester City	43	(9)
1914	Bolton Wanderers	2	(1)
- * Club domestic league appearances and goals

William Wallace (1893 – 8 November 1917), sometimes known as Billy Wallace, was an English professional footballer who played in the Football League for Manchester City and Bolton Wanderers as an outside left.

== Personal life ==
In 1915, during the second year of the First World War, Wallace enlisted as a sapper in the Royal Engineers. He was killed during the Battle of Passchendaele on 8 November 1917 and is commemorated on the Ploegsteert Memorial.

== Career statistics ==
Appearances and goals by club, season and competition
Club	Season	League			FA Cup		Total	
Club	Season	Division	Apps	Goals	Apps	Goals	Apps	Goals
Manchester City	1912–13	First Division	28	8	2	0	30	8
Manchester City	1913–14	First Division	15	1	1	0	16	1
Manchester City	Total		43	9	3	0	46	9
Bolton Wanderers	1914–15	First Division	2	1	0	0	2	1
Career total			45	10	3	0	49	10
