= James Hosie =

Scottish footballer

Personal information
- Full name: James Hosie
- Date of birth: 1876
- Place of birth: Glasgow, Scotland
- Position: Centre half

Senior career*
Years	Team	Apps	(Gls)
1897–1898	Glasgow Perthshire		
1898–1900	Reading		
1900	Blackburn Rovers	3	(0)
1900–1902	Manchester City	39	(2)
1902–1903	Stockport County	25	(3)
1903–1905	Bristol City	53	(10)
Total		120	(15)
- * Club domestic league appearances and goals

James Hosie (1876–unknown) was a Scottish footballer who played in the Football League for Blackburn Rovers, Bristol City, Manchester City and Stockport County.
