= Keith Smith (English footballer) =

English footballer

Personal information
- Full name: Keith Wilson Smith
- Date of birth: 15 September 1940 (age 86)
- Place of birth: Woodville, Derbyshire, England
- Position: Forward

Youth career
- ?–1959: West Bromwich Albion

Senior career*
| Years | Team | Apps | (Gls) |
| 1959–1963 | West Bromwich Albion | 63 | (30) |
| 1963–1964 | Peterborough United | 55 | (28) |
| 1964–1966 | Crystal Palace | 50 | (14) |
| 1966–1967 | Darlington | 17 | (2) |
| 1967 | Orient | 3 | (0) |
| 1967–1970 | Notts County | 89 | (7) |
| 1970–? | Kidderminster Harriers | ? | (?) |
| Total | | 277 | (81) |
- * Club domestic league appearances and goals

Keith Smith (born 15 September 1940) is an English retired footballer, who played as a forward. He made 277 league appearances for West Bromwich Albion, Peterborough United, Crystal Palace, Darlington, Leyton Orient and Notts County (scoring 81 goals in total), before moving into non-league football with Kidderminster Harriers. Married to Judy Wildman, his daughter was born in 1963. While he was playing for WBA, he and his wife owned and ran the chip shop in Chapman Street, West Bromwich. Following his retirement from playing football, he worked for Aston Villa as commercial director during the years of league and European success and later went on to work for West Midlands Police at Wednesbury Police Station.

== Career ==
Born in Derbyshire, Smith played professionally for West Bromwich Albion and Peterborough United, before signing for his former West Bromwich Albion manager Dick Graham, now managing Crystal Palace. On 28 August 1965, Smith became the club's first ever substitute when he replaced Ian Lawson. He also scored Palace's fastest ever goal, a six-second strike against Derby County, away from home on 12 December 1964. From Peter Burridge's kick-off Cliff Holton passed to Brian Whitehouse, and Whitehouse launched a long ball for Smith to score one of the fastest goals in association football. Smith was transferred to Darlington in 1966, before seeing out his professional career with Leyton Orient and Notts County.
