= Tony Pickrell =

Welsh footballer

Personal information
- Full name: Anthony David Pickrell
- Date of birth: 3 November 1942
- Place of birth: Neath, Wales
- Date of death: 2015 (aged 72–73)
- Place of death: Neath, Wales
- Position: Winger

Senior career*
Years	Team	Apps	(Gls)
1960–1962	Cardiff City	18	(4)
- * Club domestic league appearances and goals

Anthony David Pickrell (3 November 1942 — October 2015) was a Welsh professional footballer who played as a winger. He made 18 appearances in the Football League for Cardiff City.

== Career ==
Born in Neath, Pickrell signed for Cardiff City in 1960. The following season, he broke into the first team, making eighteen league appearances and scoring four times. However, he contracted a serious chest illness that forced him to retire from football.
