= Laurie Barnett =

English footballer

Personal information
- Full name: Laurence Hector Barnett
- Date of birth: 8 May 1900
- Place of birth: Rotherham, England
- Date of death: 13 June 1982 (aged 82)
- Height: 5 ft 10 in (1.78 m)
- Positions: Full back; left half

Senior career*
Years	Team	Apps	(Gls)
1920–1921	Bradford Park Avenue	33	(0)
- Gainsborough Trinity
1924–1925	Barnsley	28	(0)
1926–1928	Blackpool	46	(0)
1930–1934	Manchester City	84	(0)
- * Club domestic league appearances and goals

Laurence Hector Barnett (8 May 1900 – 13 June 1982) was an English footballer. He began his career with Bradford Park Avenue in 1920. After 33 League appearances for the club, he had a spell with Gainsborough Trinity. In 1924 he joined Barnsley, for whom he made 28 appearances in the League. A year later he signed for Blackpool, making 46 League appearances in his two years with the Bloomfield Road club. He finished his career with Manchester City, where he made 84 League appearances in his four years at Maine Road.

== Honours ==
Manchester City

- FA Cup: 1933–34
