= Clifford Coupland =

English footballer

Personal information
- Full name: Clifford Coupland
- Date of birth: 29 May 1900
- Place of birth: Grimsby, England
- Date of death: 30 January 1969 (aged 68)
- Height: 5 ft 8 in (1.73 m)
- Position: Wing half

Senior career*
| Years | Team | Apps | (Gls) |
| 1919–1920 | Haycroft Rovers | | |
| 1920–1921 | Grimsby Rovers | | |
| 1921–1923 | Grimsby Town | 43 | (2) |
| 1923–1925 | Mansfield Town | | |
| 1925–1927 | Manchester City | 24 | (2) |
| 1927–1928 | Grimsby Town | 13 | (0) |
| 1928–1929 | Caernarvon Athletic | | |
| 1929–1930 | Sittingbourne | | |
| 1930–1931 | Crystal Palace | 0 | (0) |
| 1931 | Macclesfield | 2 | (0) |
- * Club domestic league appearances and goals

Clifford Coupland (29 May 1900 – 30 January 1969) was an English professional footballer who played as a defender.
