= Dick Le Flem =

English footballer (born 1942)

Personal information
- Full name: Richard Peter Le Flem
- Date of birth: 12 July 1942 (age 84)
- Place of birth: Bradford on Avon, England
- Position: Left winger

Youth career
- 1959–1960: Nottingham Forest

Senior career*
| Years | Team | Apps | (Gls) |
| 1960–1964 | Nottingham Forest | 132 | (18) |
| 1964–1965 | Wolverhampton Wanderers | 19 | (5) |
| 1965–1966 | Middlesbrough | 9 | (1) |
| 1965–1967 | Leyton Orient | 11 | (2) |
| Total | | 171 | (26) |

International career
| 1961 | England U23 | 1 | (0) |
- * Club domestic league appearances and goals

Richard Peter Le Flem (born 12 July 1942) is an English retired professional footballer who played as a left winger. He played in the Football League for Nottingham Forest, Wolverhampton Wanderers, Middlesbrough and Leyton Orient, and made one appearances for the England U23 national team at international level.

== Early life ==
Dick Le Flem was born in Bradford on Avon, Wiltshire, on 12 July 1942. His parents were from Guernsey, but had evacuated to England due to the German occupation of the Channel Islands during the Second World War. He grew up on Guernsey after the war.

== Club career ==
Le Flem was one of a number of young footballers from the Channel Islands recruited by Nottingham Forest in the 1950s. He joined the club as an apprentice in 1959 before signing as a professional in May 1960. He made his debut in a 3–1 win away to Cardiff City on 10 September 1960 and went on to play 132 Football League games for Forest, scoring 18 goals. He was transferred to Wolverhampton Wanderers in January 1964, in a swap for Alan Hinton. His spell at Wolves was disrupted by serious illness, when he contracted jaundice on a visit home to Guernsey. He later had short spells with Middlesbrough and Leyton Orient before retiring from football in 1967.

== International career ==
Le Flem played once for the England under-23 team on 23 November 1961, in 1 5–2 win over the Netherlands in Rotterdam. He made another representative appearance in 1965, when he played for an FA XI that beat Jersey 10–0.

== After football ==
Le Flem returned to Guernsey after retirement, working as an export specialist for an electronics company. He later worked for Guernsey Water as a mains and service executive.
