= William Bankes =

William Bankes may refer to:

- William John Bankes (1786–1855), egyptologist
- William George Hawtry Bankes (1836–1858), Victoria Cross recipient
- William Bankes, showman and owner of the performing horse Marocco

== See also ==
- William Banks (disambiguation)
