= Dai Ward =

Welsh footballer

Personal information
- Full name: David Ward
- Date of birth: 16 July 1934
- Place of birth: Barry, Wales
- Date of death: 12 January 1996 (aged 61)
- Place of death: Cambridge, England
- Height: 5 ft 8 in (1.73 m)
- Position: Forward

Senior career*
Years	Team	Apps	(Gls)
1952–1954	Barry Town	2	(1)
1954	Cardiff City	0	(0)
1954–1961	Bristol Rovers	175	(90)
1961–1962	Cardiff City	35	(18)
1962–1963	Watford	59	(31)
1963–1965	Brentford	47	(21)
1965–1966	Worcester City	42	(8)
1966–1967	Bath City	30	(15)
1967–1968	Cambridge United		(22)
1968–1970	Cambridge City	34	(15)

International career
1959–1961	Wales	2	(0)
- * Club domestic league appearances and goals

David Ward (16 July 1934 – 12 January 1996) was a Welsh former professional footballer and Wales international. During his career in The Football League, he averaged a goal every other game, scoring 160 goals in 316 matches between 1954 and 1965.

== Career ==
Ward began his career at his hometown side Barry Town and his eight goals in five appearances during the 1951–52 Southern and Welsh League seasons led a number of teams to take an interest in him. He eventually signed for Bristol Rovers but it was a number of years before he managed to hold down a regular place in the side due to the presence of one of the club's all-time greats in Geoff Bradford. Eventually handed a chance in the side he responded by scoring nine times in his first eight games. His most prolific season for the club was in 1958–59 when he finished the season with 27 goals in 38 matches. It was this form that resulted in him earning his first cap for Wales in a 2–2 draw with England on 26 November 1958 in the 1959 British Home Championship.

Ward's spell at the club turned sour when he fell out with manager Bert Tann and began a bitter battle to leave the club, even at one time threatening to quit football entirely unless he was allowed to leave. He left the club in February 1961 to return to his home country to sign for Cardiff City. In his first full season at the club he finished as the top scorer with 17 goals and was handed his second Wales cap in a 1–1 draw with England on 14 October 1961. However his efforts could not stop the club being relegated from Division One and the following season he fell out of favour and was allowed to join Watford, where he spent one year before finishing his professional career at Brentford. Dai went on to play for Worcester City, Bath City, Cambridge United and Cambridge City. He also was assistant manager at Histon in 1983 where his son, also a David, was a member of the squad.
