= William E. Banks (Oklahoma politician) =

Member of the Oklahoma House of Representatives from the Jackson County district
- In office November 16, 1907 – 1909
- Preceded by: Position established
- Succeeded by: S. G. Ashby

Personal details
- Born: July 19, 1848 Springdale, Arkansas, United States
- Died: June 18, 1915 (aged 66) Jackson County, Oklahoma, United States
- Political party: Democratic Party

William E. Banks (July 19, 1848 – June 18, 1915) was an American politician who served in the Oklahoma House of Representatives and as a member of the Oklahoma Constitutional Convention.

== Biography ==
William E. Banks was born on July 19, 1848, in Springdale, Arkansas, to Simon Banks and Mary Sherrod. During the American Civil War, he served in the Confederate States Army. In 1875, he married Bettie Elizabeth Fitzgerald and the couple had five children. In 1878, he moved to Texas and in 1888 settled in Greer County, Texas. He participated in the Land Run of 1889, but quickly sold his claim in Oklahoma County and returned to Greer County. He was elected to represented the county at the Oklahoma Constitutional Convention and he provided the name for Jackson County, Oklahoma. He was elected to the 1st Oklahoma Legislature as a member of the Democratic Party representing Jackson County. He served in the Oklahoma House of Representatives from 1907 to 1909. He was succeeded by S. G. Ashby. He died on June 18, 1915, in Jackson County.
