= William A. Banks =

American neuroimmunologist (born 1954)

William Allen Banks
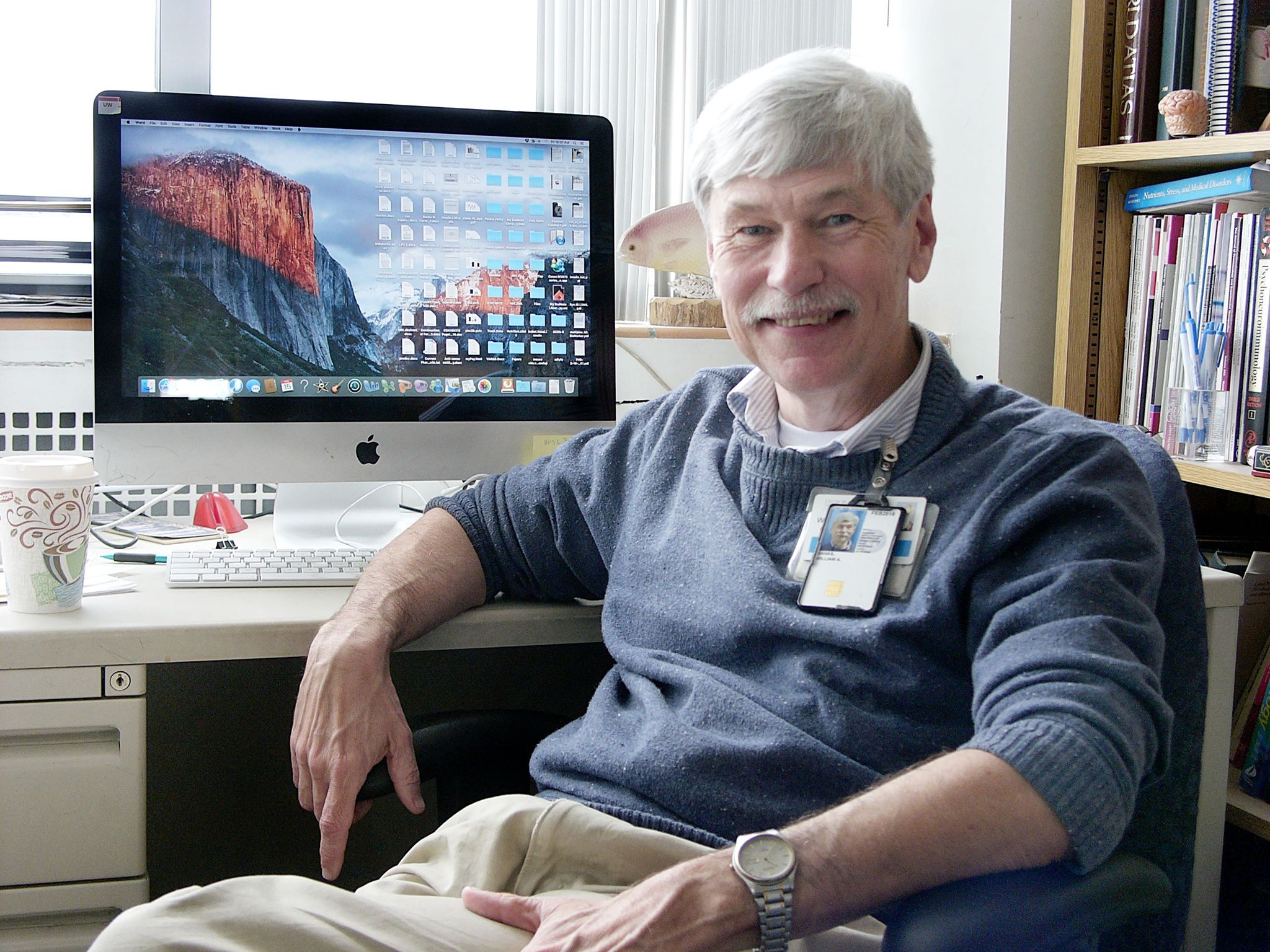
- Banks in 2016
- Born: 1954 (age 71–72); Bloomfield, Missouri, USA
- Education: University of Missouri–St. Louis; University of Missouri, Columbia
- Scientific career
- Institutions: Tulane University; Saint Louis University; University of Washington

William Allen Banks, also known as Bill Banks (born 1954) is an American neuroimmunologist, neurologist, and an expert on the modulation of neuroimmune reactions through the blood-brain barrier. He is a Professor of Medicine in the Division of Gerontology and Geriatric Medicine at the University of Washington School of Medicine and the Associate Chief of Staff for Research and Development at the VA Puget Sound Health Care System in Seattle, Washington.

== Education and career ==
Banks was born in Bloomfield, Missouri and received his B.A. in biology from University of Missouri–St. Louis in 1975 before receiving his M.D. in 1979 from University of Missouri- Columbia. He completed an endocrinology fellowship in 1982 at the Veterans Administration Medical Center in New Orleans, Louisiana, with Abba Kastin, studying the blood-brain barrier (BBB). Together, they published nearly 150 manuscripts, driving the field of regulatory peptide BBB transport.

In 1984, Banks became an Assistant Professor in the Department of Medicine at Tulane University, School of Medicine. He advanced through the faculty ranks to Professor until 1998. In 1998, he moved to St. Louis University Department of Internal Medicine and joined the GRECC faculty at the Veterans Affairs Medical Center St. Louis. In 2010, he moved to his present location at the VA Puget Sound Health Care System and University of Washington in Seattle, WA.

Banks' interest for more than 40 years has focused on brain-body communication as mediated by the handling of peptides, regulatory proteins, and other informational molecules by the BBB. He has applied this approach to studies of obesity/body weight regulation, Alzheimer's disease/neurodegenerative diseases, neuroimmunology/neuroinflammation, CNS manifestations of diabetes mellitus, drug delivery to the central nervous system, and AIDS. He has also published on animal assisted therapy in nursing homes, robotics in geriatric medicine, sleep physiology, traumatic brain injury, and was first author on the paper first describing primary adrenal hyperplasia.

== Awards and recognition ==
In 2014, Banks received the Norman Cousins award, the highest honor given by the Psychoneuroimmunology Research Society (PNIRS), to an individual for outstanding contributions to research in psychoneuroimmunology. In 2018, he received the Middleton Award from the United States Department of Veterans Affairs, the highest honor awarded annually by the Biomedical Laboratory Research and Development Service to senior VA biomedical research scientists in recognition of their outstanding scientific contributions and achievements in the areas of biomedical and biobehavioral research relevant to the healthcare of Veterans. In 2022, he received the Viktor Mutt Lectureship Award from the International Society of Bioactive Peptides. Banks has been invited to give over 200 lectures all over the world. He has been ranked as a top-rated expert in the BBB and as a highly cited researcher, in the top 0.1% of researchers. He has published over 600 peer reviewed manuscripts and currently has an H index of 133.

Banks has been a member of multiple national and internationally known research societies, serving as President for some of them, including the Society for Neuroscience-New Orleans Chapter and PNIRS. He is also a founding or charter member of the American Peptide Society, International Behavioral Neuroscience Society, and International Neuropeptide Society.
