= Carlos Aguiar =

Uruguayan footballer (born 1978)

Personal information
- Full name: Carlos Antonio Aguiar Burgos
- Date of birth: 19 December 1978 (age 47)
- Place of birth: Montevideo, Uruguay
- Height: 1.73 m (5 ft 8 in)
- Position: Midfielder

Team information
- Current team: Atenas de San Carlos (manager)

Senior career*
Years	Team	Apps	(Gls)
2000–2002	River Plate Montevideo		
2002–2003	Skoda Xanthi	2	(0)
2003	Racing Club		
2004	Uruguay Montevideo		
2005	Rampla Juniors	30	(11)
2006	Tiro Federal	9	(1)
2006–2007	Rampla Juniors	39	(6)
2008	Liverpool	14	(3)
2008–2009	Académica de Coimbra	6	(0)
2009–2010	Fénix	26	(4)
2010–2011	Huachipato	19	(3)
2011	Fénix		

Managerial career
- 2019–2022: Atenas de San Carlos (youth)
- 2021: Atenas de San Carlos (interim)
- 2023: Oriental
- 2024–: Atenas de San Carlos
- * Club domestic league appearances and goals

Carlos Antonio Aguiar Burgos (born 19 December 1978) is a Uruguayan football manager and former player who played as a midfielder. He is the current manager of Atenas de San Carlos.

== Career ==
On 24 April 2009, he asked for the termination of his contract in order to leave Académica de Coimbra and return home.

== Personal life ==
He also holds Italian citizenship. Carlos is the brother of another professional footballer Luis Bernardo Aguiar.
