= Bankes Coffee Stores =

20th-century Chicago-based coffee chain

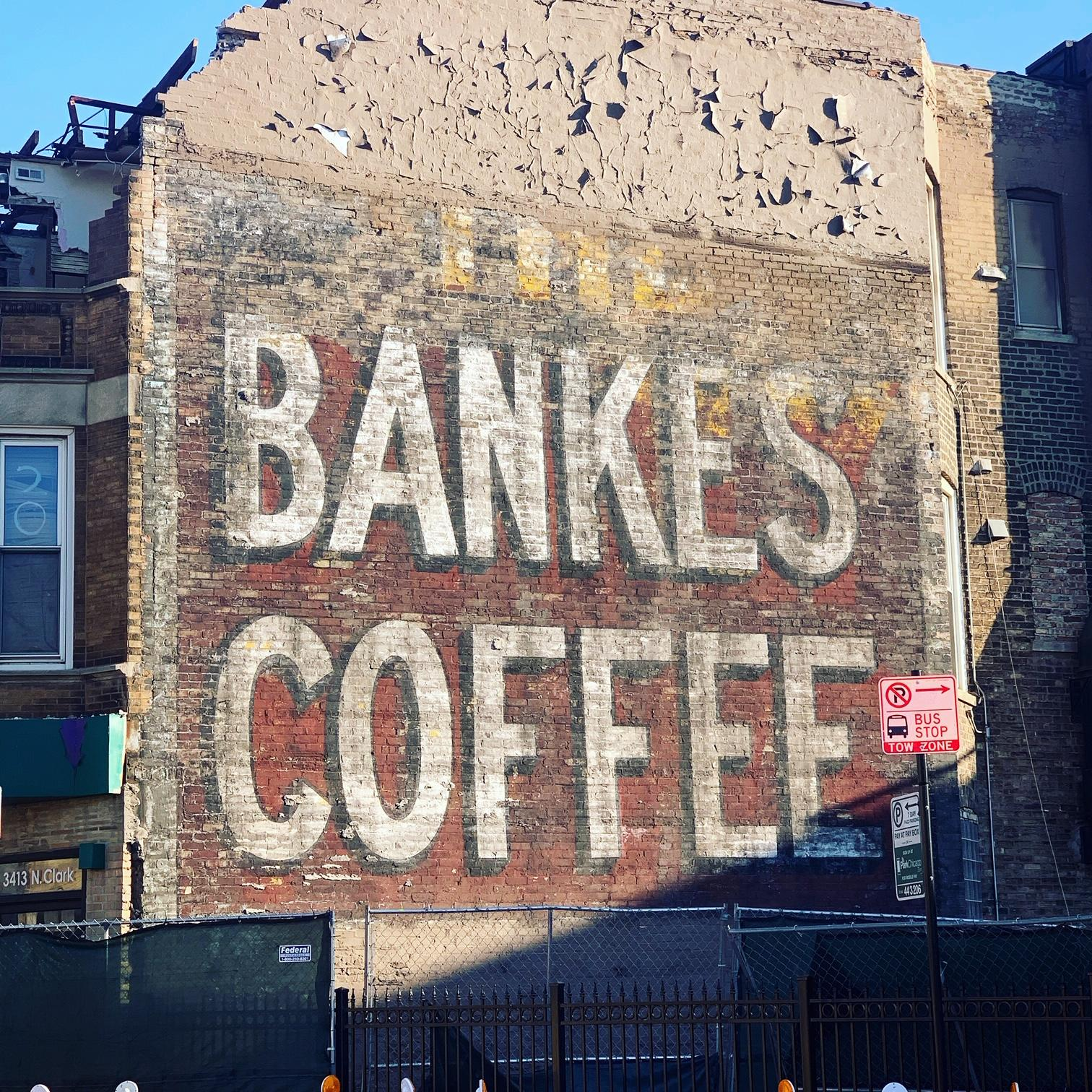
Painted brick ad seen at 3413 North Clark Street in Chicago, Illinois

Bankes Coffee Stores (also known as E. Bankes & Co.) was a chain of stores that operated in the Chicago region throughout the early 20th century. The company was founded in 1882 by Ireland-born Edward Bankes (c.1860–1936) as a tea and coffee mercantile business. Dubbed "the Starbucks of Chicago", during its peak the company operated over 20 stores.

== See also ==
- List of coffeehouse chains
