= Willie Banks (footballer) =

Scottish footballer

Personal information
- Full name: William Banks
- Date of birth: 2 November 1880
- Place of birth: Riccarton, East Ayrshire, Scotland
- Position: Wing half

Senior career*
Years	Team	Apps	(Gls)
1901–1902	Glenbuck Cherrypickers		
1902–1903	Rugby XI		
1903–1905	Kilmarnock		
1905–1907	Manchester City	25	(1)
1908	Atherton Combe		
1908	Hurlford		
1908–1909	Portsmouth		
1909–1911	Alberta		
1911–1912	Manchester City	0	(0)
1912	Kilmarnock		
1912	Nithsdale Wanderers		
Total		25	(1)
- * Club domestic league appearances and goals

William Banks (born 2 November 1880) was a Scottish footballer who played in the Football League for Manchester City.
