= Ray Sambrook =

English footballer

Personal information
- Full name: Raymond Sambrook
- Date of birth: 21 May 1933
- Place of birth: Wolverhampton, England
- Date of death: 1999 (aged 65–66)
- Place of death: Newport, Wales
- Position: Winger

Youth career
- Wednesfield

Senior career*
Years	Team	Apps	(Gls)
1954–1957	Coventry City	96	(25)
1957–1962	Manchester City	62	(13)
1962–1963	Doncaster Rovers	8	(0)
	Crewe Alexandra	0	(0)
Total		166	(38)
- * Club domestic league appearances and goals

Ray Sambrook (1933–1999) was an English footballer, who played as a winger in the Football League for Coventry City, Manchester City and Doncaster Rovers.
