= Eric Williams (footballer) =

English footballer (1921–2001)

Personal information
- Date of birth: 10 July 1921
- Place of birth: Salford, England
- Date of death: January 2001 (aged 79)
- Place of death: Colwyn, Wales
- Position: Full back

Senior career*
Years	Team	Apps	(Gls)
1946–1950	Manchester City	38	(0)
1951	Mossley		
1951–1954	Halifax Town	111	(0)
1955–19??	Mossley		
Total		149	(0)
- * Club domestic league appearances and goals

Eric Williams (10 July 1921 – January 2001) was an English footballer who played as a full back in the Football League for Manchester City and Halifax Town. Williams was born in Salford on 10 July 1921. Following his football career, Williams moved to north Wales with his wife, where he ran a shop in Llangernyw for 11 years. He later took a job as a distribution driver in Colwyn Bay, working with them for seven years before his retirement. Williams died in Colwyn, Wales in January 2001, aged 79.
