= 1965–66 Cardiff City F.C. season =

Welsh football club season

Cardiff City
1965–66 season
- Chairman: Fred Dewey
- Manager: Jimmy Scoular
- Football League Second Division: 20th
- FA Cup: 4th round
- League Cup: Semi-finals
- European Cup Winners Cup: 1st round
- Welsh Cup: 5th round
- Top goalscorer: League: George Johnston (17); All: George Johnston (23)
- Highest home attendance: 19,827 (v Wolverhampton Wanderers, 4 September 1965)
- Lowest home attendance: 5,934 (v Norwich City, 10 May 1966)
- Average home league attendance: 11,005
Home colours

The 1965–66 season was Cardiff City F.C.'s 39th season in the Football League. They competed in the 22-team Division Two, then the second tier of English football, finishing twentieth.

The season also saw the club reach the semi-finals of the Football League Cup, the furthest they had ever gone in the competition, before being beaten by West Ham United.

== Players ==
Note: Flags indicate national team as defined under FIFA eligibility rules; some limited exceptions apply. Players may hold more than one non-FIFA nationality.

No.	Pos.	Nation	Player
--	GK	WAL	Lyn Davies
--	GK	WAL	Dilwyn John
--	GK	ENG	Bob Wilson
--	DF	WAL	Colin Baker
--	DF	ENG	David Carver
--	DF	WAL	Graham Coldrick
--	DF	ENG	Bobby Ferguson
--	DF	WAL	Alan Harrington
--	DF	SCO	Don Murray
--	DF	WAL	Peter Rodrigues
--	MF	ENG	Ronnie Bird
--	MF	SCO	Greg Farrell
--	MF	WAL	Barrie Hole

No.	Pos.	Nation	Player
--	MF	SCO	David Houston
--	MF	ENG	Peter King
--	MF	WAL	Bernie Lewis
--	MF	WAL	Pat Murphy
--	MF	WAL	David Summerhayes
--	MF	ENG	Gareth Williams
--	MF	WAL	David Yorath
--	FW	ENG	George Andrews
--	FW	WAL	John Charles
--	FW	NIR	Terry Harkin
--	FW	SCO	George Johnston
--	FW	WAL	John Toshack

== League standings ==
Pos	Team	Pld	W	D	L	GF	GA	GAv	Pts	Qualification or relegation
18	Plymouth Argyle	42	12	13	17	54	63	0.857	37	
19	Bury	42	14	7	21	62	76	0.816	35	
20	Cardiff City	42	12	10	20	71	91	0.780	34	
21	Middlesbrough (R)	42	10	13	19	58	86	0.674	33	Relegation to the Third Division
22	Leyton Orient (R)	42	5	13	24	38	80	0.475	23	Relegation to the Third Division

Rules for classification: 1) Points; 2) Goal average; 3) Goals scored
(R) Relegated

=== Results by round ===
Round	1	2	3	4	5	6	7	8	9	10	11	12	13	14	15	16	17	18	19	20	21	22	23	24	25	26	27	28	29	30	31	32	33	34	35	36	37	38	39	40	41	42
Ground	H	H	A	A	H	A	A	H	A	H	A	H	A	H	A	H	H	A	H	A	H	A	H	H	A	A	A	H	H	A	H	A	H	H	A	A	A	A	H	H	A	H
Result	W	W	L	W	L	L	L	W	D	L	D	L	L	W	L	W	W	W	L	D	L	L	L	W	D	D	L	D	D	D	W	L	L	D	L	L	L	D	W	W	L	L
Position			6	3	7	7	15	17	16	15	16	19	19	17	20	15	12	11	11	13	13	14	15	14	14	15	17	17	18	16	14	17	18	19	19	19	20	21	21	18	19	20
Points	2	4	4	6	6	6	6	8	9	9	10	10	10	12	12	14	16	18	18	19	19	19	19	21	22	23	23	24	25	26	28	28	28	29	29	29	29	30	32	34	34	34

Source: Competitive matches
A = Away; H = Home; W = Win; D = Draw; L = Loss

== Fixtures and results ==
=== Second Division ===
21 August 1965 1	Cardiff City	1 – 0	Bury	Cardiff
15:00	John Charles 10'			Stadium: Ninian Park; Attendance: 13,392; Referee: Denis Howell (Birmingham)

25 August 1965 2	Cardiff City	2 – 1	Derby County	Cardiff
19:30	Terry Harkin; John Charles		Gordon Hughes	Stadium: Ninian Park; Attendance: 15,260; Referee: Jim Finney (Hereford)

28 August 1965 3	Norwich City	3 – 2	Cardiff City	Norwich
15:00	Gordon Bolland 11'; Ron Davies 43'; Mal Lucas 65'		44' (pen.) George Johnston; 63' Terry Harkin	Stadium: Carrow Road; Attendance: 13,437

1 September 1965 4	Derby County	1 – 5	Cardiff City	Derby
19:15	Gordon Hughes		George Johnston (pen.) George Johnston; John Charles; John Charles; Terry Harkin	Stadium: Baseball Ground; Attendance: 10,221; Referee: Vernon Batty (Helsby Cheshire)

4 September 1965 5	Cardiff City	1 – 4	Wolverhampton Wanderers	Cardiff
15:00	George Johnston 77' (pen.)		13', 16' Hugh McIlmoyle; 27' (o.g.) Gareth Williams; 90' Dave Wagstaffe	Stadium: Ninian Park; Attendance: 19,827; Referee: W Crossley (Lancaster)

11 September 1965 6	Rotherham United	6 – 4	Cardiff City	Rotherham
15:00	Barry Lyons 1'; John Galley 27', 32'; Bobby Williams 40', 60', 72' (pen.)		26' Greg Farrell; 30', 88' Terry Harkin; 48' George Johnston	Stadium: Millmoor; Attendance: 9,211

14 September 1965 7	Charlton Athletic	5 – 2	Cardiff City	London
19:30	Mike Kenning 12', 61'; Len Glover 16'; Ron Saunders 18'; Frank Haydock 39'		41' Terry Harkin; 43' George Johnston	Stadium: The Valley; Attendance: 13,172; Referee: Harry New (Hampshire)

18 September 1965 8	Cardiff City	4 – 3	Manchester City	Cardiff
15:00	George Johnston; George Johnston; Barrie Hole; Terry Harkin		Matt Gray; Jimmy Murray; Glyn Pardoe	Stadium: Ninian Park; Attendance: 11,365; Referee: Peter Walters (Bridgwater)

25 September 1965 9	Bristol City	1 – 1	Cardiff City	Bristol
	John Atyeo 47'		87' Bernie Lewis	Stadium: Ashton Gate; Attendance: 15,300

6 October 1965 10	Cardiff City	1 – 2	Coventry City	Cardiff
19:30	Gareth Williams 55'	Sky Blue Archive	44' George Curtis; 87' Ronnie Rees	Stadium: Ninian Park; Attendance: 12,469; Referee: ED Wallace (Swindon)

9 October 1965 11	Plymouth Argyle	2 – 2	Cardiff City	Plymouth
	Mike Trebilcock; Barrie Jones		Greg Farrell; George Johnston	Stadium: Home Park; Attendance: 10,740; Referee: G Martin (Whitchurch, Hants)

16 October 1965 12	Cardiff City	1 – 2	Portsmouth	Cardiff
15:00	George Johnston		Alex Wilson; Ray Hiron	Stadium: Ninian Park; Attendance: 11,781; Referee: Norman Matthews (Oxford)

23 October 1965 13	Bolton Wanderers	2 – 1	Cardiff City	Bolton
	Wyn Davies 29'; Gordon Taylor 73'		31' George Andrews	Stadium: Burnden Park; Attendance: 11,088

30 October 1965 14	Cardiff City	1 – 0	Ipswich Town	Cardiff
15:00	Greg Farrell			Stadium: Ninian Park; Attendance: 8,325; Referee: RF Prichard (Salisbury)

6 November 1965 15	Birmingham City	4 – 2	Cardiff City	Birmingham
	Mickey Bullock; Bobby Thomson; Stan Lynn (pen.); Alec Jackson		George Andrews; George Andrews	Stadium: St Andrew's; Attendance: 10,744; Referee: RV Spittle (Great Yarmouth)

10 November 1965 16	Cardiff City	3 – 1	Charlton Athletic	Cardiff
19:30	George Johnston 15' (pen.), 59' (pen.); George Andrews 35'		24' Roy Matthews	Stadium: Ninian Park; Attendance: 8,537; Referee: Ken Burns (Stourbridge)

13 November 1965 17	Cardiff City	3 – 1	Leyton Orient	Cardiff
15:00	George Johnston; George Andrews; John Toshack		29' Peter Allen	Stadium: Ninian Park; Attendance: 9,017; Referee: Bill Clements (West Bromwich)

20 November 1965 18	Middlesbrough	3 – 4	Cardiff City	Middlesbrough
15:00	Stan Anderson; Edwin Holliday; Eric McMordie		John Toshack; John Toshack (o.g.) Ian Davidson (pen.) George Johnston	Stadium: Ayresome Park; Attendance: 11,898

27 November 1965 19	Cardiff City	0 – 1	Huddersfield Town	Cardiff
15:00			74' Steve Smith	Stadium: Ninian Park; Attendance: 10,898; Referee: G Martin (Whitchurch, Hants)

4 December 1965 20	Crystal Palace	0 – 0	Cardiff City	London
				Stadium: Selhurst Park; Attendance: 11,527

11 December 1965 21	Cardiff City	1 – 3	Preston North End	Cardiff
15:00	George Johnston 43'		5' Alex Dawson; 30' Stan Lapot; 77' Ernie Hannigan	Stadium: Ninian Park; Attendance: 10,754; Referee: Danny Lyden (Birmingham)

18 December 1965 22	Portsmouth	3 – 1	Cardiff City	Portsmouth
	Albert McCann 43'; Dennis Edwards 62', 81'		64' George Andrews	Stadium: Fratton Park; Attendance: 8,434; Referee: Ray Tinkler (Boston)

27 December 1965 23	Cardiff City	3 – 5	Southampton	Cardiff
15:00	Terry Harkin 5'; George Andrews 43'; Dave Walker 68' (o.g.)		31', 50', 78' Martin Chivers; 36', 55' Terry Paine	Stadium: Ninian Park; Attendance: 14,768; Referee: Eric Jennings (Stourbridge)

1 January 1966 24	Cardiff City	5 – 1	Plymouth Argyle	Cardiff
15:00	George Andrews 7', 75'; Terry Harkin 44', 61'; Barrie Hole 51'		69' Norman Piper	Stadium: Ninian Park; Attendance: 8,890; Referee: Harry New (Portsmouth)

8 January 1966 25	Leyton Orient	1 – 1	Cardiff City	London
	Tony Nicholas 30'		41' George Andrews	Stadium: Brisbane Road; Attendance: 5,516; Referee: JE Thacker (Scarborough)

29 January 1966 26	Bury	1 – 1	Cardiff City	Bury
15:15	Bobby Owen 68'		79' George Johnston	Stadium: Gigg Lane; Attendance: 4,677

19 February 1966 27	Wolverhampton Wanderers	2 – 1	Cardiff City	Wolverhampton
	Terry Wharton 44', 47'		65' George Andrews	Stadium: Molineux; Attendance: 24,179; Referee: Don Roper (Cambridge)

26 February 1966 28	Cardiff City	0 – 0	Rotherham United	Cardiff
15:00				Stadium: Ninian Park; Attendance: 9,184; Referee: GWT Davies (Romford)

5 March 1966 29	Cardiff City	1 – 1	Bolton Wanderers	Cardiff
15:00	Greg Farrell 60'		73' Wyn Davies	Stadium: Ninian Park; Attendance: 8,951; Referee: RF Prichard (Salisbury)

12 March 1966 30	Manchester City	2 – 2	Cardiff City	Manchester
15:00	Neil Young 10'; Dave Connor 27'		4' John Toshack; 33' George Johnston	Stadium: Maine Road; Attendance: 29,642; Referee: WJ Gow (Birmingham)

18 March 1966 31	Cardiff City	2 – 1	Bristol City	Cardiff
19:30	Peter King 15'; John Toshack 40'		82' Brian Clark	Stadium: Ninian Park; Attendance: 13,405; Referee: Bill Handley (Cannock, Staffordshire)

26 March 1966 32	Coventry City	3 – 1	Cardiff City	Coventry
	Peter Denton 3'; Ron Farmer 15' (pen.); Ernie Machin 86'	Sky Blue Archive	70' George Andrews	Stadium: Highfield Road; Attendance: 20,296; Referee: Frank Cowen (Manchester)

2 April 1966 33	Cardiff City	1 – 3	Birmingham City	Cardiff
15:00	Barrie Hole		18', 44' Geoff Vowden; 52' (o.g.) David Carver	Stadium: Ninian Park; Attendance: 8,150

8 April 1966 34	Cardiff City	1 – 1	Carlisle United	Cardiff
15:00	George Andrews		Willie Carlin	Stadium: Ninian Park; Attendance: 7,844; Referee: Peter Brandwood (Walsall)

9 April 1966 35	Ipswich Town	2 – 1	Cardiff City	Ipswich
	Billy Baxter; Gerry Baker		John Toshack	Stadium: Portman Road; Attendance: 10,392; Referee: DA Corbett (Wolverhampton)

12 April 1966 36	Carlisle United	2 – 0	Cardiff City	Carlisle
19:30	Dave Wilson; Peter McConnell			Stadium: Brunton Park; Attendance: 11,252

20 April 1966 37	Southampton	3 – 2	Cardiff City	Southampton
	Terry Paine 36', 69' (pen.); Norman Dean 45'		61', 87' Peter King	Stadium: The Dell; Attendance: 18,941

23 April 1966 38	Huddersfield Town	1 – 1	Cardiff City	Huddersfield
	David Carver (o.g.)		Peter King	Stadium: Leeds Road; Attendance: 19,138

30 April 1966 39	Cardiff City	1 – 0	Crystal Palace	Cardiff
15:00	Peter King			Stadium: Ninian Park; Attendance: 9,420; Referee: VJ Batty (Cheshire)

4 May 1966 40	Cardiff City	5 – 3	Middlesbrough	Cardiff
19:30	Barrie Hole 25'; Greg Farrell 29' (pen.); George Andrews 35', 86'; Peter King 65'		6', 27' (pen.), 90' Dickie Rooks	Stadium: Ninian Park; Attendance: 12,935; Referee: Peter Walters (Bridgwater)

7 May 1966 41	Preston North End	9 – 0	Cardiff City	Preston
	Ernie Hannigan 9', 39', 44'; Nobby Lawton 20'; Brian Greenhalgh 28', 81'; Brian Godfrey 71' (pen.), 73', 76'			Stadium: Deepdale; Attendance: 10,018

10 May 1966 42	Cardiff City	0 – 2	Norwich City	Cardiff
19:30			(??) Hugh Curran	Stadium: Ninian Park; Attendance: 5,934; Referee: William Clements (West Bromwich)

=== League Cup ===
22 September 1965 Round 1	Crewe Alexandra	1 – 1	Cardiff City	Crewe
19:30	Goal		Bernie Lewis	Stadium: Gresty Road; Attendance: 5,832

29 September 1965 Round 1 (Replay)	Cardiff City	3 – 0	Crewe Alexandra	Cardiff
19:30	Peter King; Peter King; Terry Harkin			Stadium: Ninian Park; Attendance: 6,939; Referee: Jack Taylor (Wolverhampton)

13 October 1965 Round 2	Cardiff City	2 – 0	Portsmouth	Cardiff
19:30	Peter King; George Andrews			Stadium: Ninian Park; Attendance: 8,803; Referee: David Smith (Stonehouse)

3 November 1965 Round 3	Cardiff City	5 – 1	Reading	Cardiff
19:30	George Johnston; George Johnston; George Johnston; Terry Harkin; Terry Harkin		Goal	Stadium: Ninian Park; Attendance: 6,698; Referee: Jim Finney (Hereford)

17 November 1965 Quarter Final	Cardiff City	2 – 1	Ipswich Town	Cardiff
19:30	George Andrews; Barrie Hole		Frank Brogan	Stadium: Ninian Park; Attendance: 7,748; Referee: Peter Brandwood (Walsall)

15 December 1965 Semi Final (First Leg)	West Ham United	5 – 2	Cardiff City	London
19:30	Eddie Bovington 7'; Johnny Byrne 42'; Peter Brabrook 55'; John Sissons 75'; Geoff Hurst 89'		87', 88' George Andrews	Stadium: Upton Park; Attendance: 19,980; Referee: Ray Tinkler (Boston)

2 February 1966 Semi Final (Second Leg)	Cardiff City	1 – 5 (3 – 10 agg.)	West Ham United	Cardiff
19:30	Bernie Lewis 76'		5', 50' Geoff Hurst; John Sissons; Martin Peters; Dennis Burnett	Stadium: Ninian Park; Attendance: 14,313

=== FA Cup ===
26 January 1966 Round 3	Cardiff City	2 – 1	Port Vale	Cardiff
19:30	Peter King 7'; Barrie Hole 90'		John Rowland	Stadium: Ninian Park; Attendance: 18,898; Referee: Eric Jennings (Stourbridge)

12 February 1966 Round 4	Southport	2 – 0	Cardiff City	Southport
	Alan Spence; Ron Smith			Stadium: Haig Avenue; Attendance: 14,230

=== European Cup Winners Cup ===
8 September 1965 Round 1 (First Leg)	Cardiff City	1 – 2	Standard Liège	Cardiff
19:30	George Johnston 30'		40' Roger Claessen; 68' Leon Semmeling	Stadium: Ninian Park; Attendance: 12,798; Referee: Adrianus Aalbrecht (Netherlands)

20 October 1965 Round 1 (Second Leg)	Standard Liège	1 – 0 (3 – 1 agg.)	Cardiff City	Liege, Belgium
	Alan Harrington 48' (o.g.)			Stadium: Stade Maurice Dufrasne; Attendance: 17,985; Referee: Francisco Guerra (Portugal)

=== Welsh Cup ===
4 January 1966 5	Swansea Town	2 – 2	Cardiff City	Swansea
19:30	Don Murray (o.g.); Ivor Allchurch		George Andrews; Peter King	Stadium: Vetch Field; Attendance: 10,000

8 February 1966 5 (Replay)	Cardiff City	3 – 5 (a.e.t.)	Swansea Town	Cardiff
19:30	Gareth Williams; George Johnston; George Johnston		Keith Todd; Keith Todd; Herbie Williams; Jim McLaughlin; Brian Evans	Stadium: Ninian Park; Attendance: 9,836; Referee: Leo Callaghan (Merthyr Tydfil)

== See also ==
- List of Cardiff City F.C. seasons
