= 1966–67 Cardiff City F.C. season =

Welsh football club season

Cardiff City
1966–67 season
- Chairman: Fred Dewey
- Manager: Jimmy Scoular
- Football League Second Division: 20th
- FA Cup: 3rd round
- League Cup: 2nd round
- Welsh Cup: Winners
- Top goalscorer: League: Bobby Brown (14); All: Bobby Brown (17)
- Highest home attendance: 19,739 (v Coventry City, 22 April 1967)
- Lowest home attendance: 5,540 (v Norwich City, 3 December 1966)
- Average home league attendance: 10,258
Home colours

The 1966–67 season was Cardiff City F.C.'s 40th season in the Football League. They competed in the 22-team Division Two, then the second tier of English football, finishing twentieth.

== Players ==
Note: Flags indicate national team as defined under FIFA eligibility rules; some limited exceptions apply. Players may hold more than one non-FIFA nationality.

Pos.	Nation	Player
GK	WAL	Lyn Davies
GK	WAL	Dilwyn John
GK	ENG	Bob Wilson
DF	ENG	Gary Bell
DF	ENG	David Carver
DF	WAL	Graham Coldrick
DF	WAL	Steve Derrett
DF	ENG	Bobby Ferguson
DF	SCO	Don Murray
DF	ENG	Derek Ryder
MF	ENG	Ronnie Bird
MF	SCO	Greg Farrell
MF	ENG	Brian Harris
MF	SCO	David Houston

Pos.	Nation	Player
MF	WAL	Barrie Jones
MF	WAL	Bryn Jones
MF	ENG	Peter King
MF	WAL	Bernie Lewis
MF	WAL	Leighton Phillips
MF	WAL	David Summerhayes
MF	ENG	Gareth Williams
MF	ENG	Jack Winspear
FW	ENG	George Andrews
FW	ENG	Bobby Brown
FW	ENG	Norman Dean
FW	NIR	Terry Harkin
FW	SCO	George Johnston
FW	WAL	John Toshack

== League standings ==
Pos	Team	Pld	W	D	L	GF	GA	GAv	Pts	Qualification or relegation
18	Rotherham United	42	13	10	19	61	70	0.871	36	
19	Charlton Athletic	42	13	9	20	49	53	0.925	35	
20	Cardiff City	42	12	9	21	61	87	0.701	33	Qualification for the European Cup Winners' Cup first round (Note: Cardiff City qualified for the European Cup Winners' Cup as the 1966–67 Welsh Cup winners.)
21	Northampton Town (R)	42	12	6	24	47	84	0.560	30	Relegation to the Third Division
22	Bury (R)	42	11	6	25	49	83	0.590	28	Relegation to the Third Division

Rules for classification: 1) Points; 2) Goal average; 3) Goals scored
(R) Relegated

=== Results by round ===
Round	1	2	3	4	5	6	7	8	9	10	11	12	13	14	15	16	17	18	19	20	21	22	23	24	25	26	27	28	29	30	31	32	33	34	35	36	37	38	39	40	41	42
Ground	H	A	H	H	H	A	H	A	A	H	H	A	A	H	A	H	A	H	A	H	A	H	A	H	A	H	A	H	A	A	H	A	H	H	A	A	H	A	H	A	H	A
Result	L	W	L	W	D	L	L	L	L	D	L	L	L	D	L	W	L	W	W	W	D	L	L	W	L	D	L	W	D	L	D	L	D	W	W	L	W	L	D	L	W	L
Position			16	14	13	15	18	18	21	20	21	22	22	22	22	22	22	22	22	21	21	21	21	21	21	20	21	20	21	21	20	22	21	20	20	20	19	20	20	20	20	20
Points	0	2	2	4	5	5	5	5	5	6	6	6	6	7	7	9	9	11	13	15	16	16	16	18	18	19	19	21	22	22	23	23	24	26	28	28	30	30	31	31	33	33

Source: Competitive matches
A = Away; H = Home; W = Win; D = Draw; L = Loss

== Fixtures and results ==
=== Second Division ===
20 August 1966 1	Cardiff City	0 – 2	Ipswich Town	Cardiff
15:00			Ray Crawford; Frank Brogan	Stadium: Ninian Park; Attendance: 7,628; Referee: Bill Handley (Cannock)

27 August 1966p 2	Bristol City	1 – 2	Cardiff City	Bristol
15:00	Gordon Low 37'		19' (pen.) John Toshack; 54' George Andrews	Stadium: Ashton Gate; Attendance: 11,952; Referee: Reg Paine (Oxford)

31 August 1966 3	Cardiff City	0 – 3	Wolverhampton Wanderers	Cardiff
19:30			75', 85' Hugh McIlmoyle; 88' Pat Buckley	Stadium: Ninian Park; Attendance: 14,208; Referee: RF Prichard (Salisbury)

3 September 1966 4	Cardiff City	4 – 2	Carlisle United	Cardiff
15:00	John Toshack 15'; Peter King 13', 25'; George Andrews 28'		Willie Carlin; Willie Carlin	Stadium: Ninian Park; Attendance: 6,902; Referee: AE Dimond (Harlow New Town)

7 September 1966 5	Cardiff City	1 – 1	Huddersfield Town	Cardiff
19:30	George Andrews		87' Steve Smith	Stadium: Ninian Park; Attendance: 10,344; Referee: Peter Walters (Bridgwater)

10 September 1966 6	Blackburn Rovers	4 – 1	Cardiff City	Blackburn
	George Jones 33'; Andy McEvoy 67', 79'; Barrie Hole 72'		77' John Toshack	Stadium: Ewood Park; Attendance: 12,805

17 September 1966 7	Cardiff City	2 – 5	Bolton Wanderers	Cardiff
15:00	George Andrews 50'; John Toshack 78' (pen.)		18', 85' (pen.) Francis Lee; 41' (o.g.) Don Murray; 59', 70' Wyn Davies	Stadium: Ninian Park; Attendance: 7,594; Referee: Harry New (Portsmouth)

21 September 1966 8	Wolverhampton Wanderers	7 – 1	Cardiff City	Wolverhampton
	Terry Wharton 4', 37' (pen.), 55' (pen.); Ernie Hunt 5'; Bobby Thomson 50'; Hugh McIlmoyle 58'; Dave Wagstaffe 85'		22' George Andrews	Stadium: Molineux; Attendance: 19,678; Referee: C Robinson (Salford)

24 September 1966 9	Charlton Athletic	5 – 0	Cardiff City	London
	Mike Kenning 40', 62' (pen.); Alan Campbell 50'; Len Glover 78'; Ron Saunders 82'			Stadium: The Valley; Attendance: 10,182; Referee: Roger Kirkpatrick (Leicester)

1 October 1966 10	Cardiff City	1 – 1	Derby County	Cardiff
15:00	Bobby Saxton (o.g.)		Alan Durban	Stadium: Ninian Park; Attendance: 6,244; Referee: Peter Bye (Bedford)

8 October 1966 11	Cardiff City	2 – 4	Hull City	Cardiff
15:00	Bernie Lewis 22'; George Andrews 30'		7', 13', 32', 89' Ken Wagstaff	Stadium: Ninian Park; Attendance: 9,407; Referee: Charles Nicholls (Plymouth)

15 October 1966 12	Plymouth Argyle	7 – 1	Cardiff City	Plymouth
	Norman Piper 2' (pen.); Nicky Jennings 22'; Richie Reynolds 30'; Mike Bickle 37', 68', 88', 89'		52' Gareth Williams	Stadium: Home Park; Attendance: 14,404; Referee: Malcolm Sinclair (Guildford)

29 October 1966 13	Millwall	1 – 0	Cardiff City	London
15:15	Doug Baker 19'			Stadium: The Den; Attendance: 12,586; Referee: Harold Williams (Sheffield)

4 November 1966 14	Cardiff City	0 – 0	Rotherham United	Cardiff
19:30				Stadium: Ninian Park; Attendance: 5,933; Referee: ED Wallace (Swindon)

12 November 1966 15	Preston North End	4 – 0	Cardiff City	Preston
	Alex Dawson 17'; Ernie Hannigan 22'; Brian Godfrey 70'; Alan Spavin 85'			Stadium: Deepdale; Attendance: 11,283

19 November 1966 16	Cardiff City	3 – 0	Bury	Cardiff
15:00	John Toshack; John Toshack; Bobby Brown			Stadium: Ninian Park; Attendance: 5,910; Referee: JR Osborne (Ipswich)

26 November 1966 17	Coventry City	3 – 2	Cardiff City	Coventry
	John Tudor 25'; Ian Gibson 47', 55'		88', 89' John Toshack	Stadium: Highfield Road; Attendance: 19,682; Referee: KJ Seddon (Formby, Lancashire)

3 December 1966 18	Cardiff City	2 – 0	Norwich City	Cardiff
18:30	Greg Farrell; Graham Coldrick			Stadium: Ninian Park; Attendance: 5,540; Referee: Ken Burns (Dudley, Worcestershire)

10 December 1966 19	Birmingham City	1 – 2	Cardiff City	Birmingham
15:00	Mickey Bullock		Graham Coldrick; Bobby Brown	Stadium: St Andrew's; Attendance: 17,046

14 December 1966 20	Cardiff City	4 – 2	Northampton Town	Cardiff
19:30	Gareth Williams; Gareth Williams; Bobby Brown; Bobby Brown		John Mackin; Don Martin	Stadium: Ninian Park; Attendance: 7,954; Referee: David (DW) Smith (Stonehouse)

17 December 1966 21	Ipswich Town	0 – 0	Cardiff City	Ipswich
15:00				Stadium: Portman Road; Attendance: 11,166; Referee: RV Spittle (Great Yarmouth)

26 December 1966 22	Cardiff City	1 – 2	Crystal Palace	Cardiff
15:00	Gareth Williams; Greg Farrell (red card)		Tom White; Terry Long	Stadium: Ninian Park; Attendance: 17,020; Referee: RF Prichard (Salisbury)

27 December 1966 23	Crystal Palace	3 – 1	Cardiff City	London
19:30	Barry Dyson; Barry Dyson; Bobby Woodruff		John Toshack	Stadium: Selhurst Park; Attendance: 13,553; Referee: Ken Wynn (Wolverhampton)

31 December 1966 24	Cardiff City	5 – 1	Bristol City	Cardiff
15:00	Bobby Brown 15', 73'; Gordon Low 41' (o.g.); Ronnie Bird 46', 62'		61' Gerry Sharpe	Stadium: Ninian Park; Attendance: 12,305; Referee: Malcolm Sinclair (Guildford)

7 January 1967 25	Carlisle United	3 – 0	Cardiff City	Carlisle
15:00	Eric Welsh 14', 89'; Dave Wilson 21'			Stadium: Brunton Park; Attendance: 10,295; Referee: Harold Richards (Oldham)

14 January 1967 26	Cardiff City	1 – 1	Blackburn Rovers	Cardiff
15:00	Bobby Brown 80'		45' John Connelly	Stadium: Ninian Park; Attendance: 11,322; Referee: JWJ Clarke (Studley, Warwickshire)

21 January 1967 27	Bolton Wanderers	3 – 1	Cardiff City	Bolton
	Warwick Rimmer 4'; Francis Lee 30'; John Byrom 65'		77' George Johnston	Stadium: Burnden Park; Attendance: 9,071

3 February 1967 28	Cardiff City	4 – 1	Charlton Athletic	Cardiff
19:30	Ronnie Bird 7'; Peter King 28'; George Johnston 53', 81'		77' Rodney Green	Stadium: Ninian Park; Attendance: 10,812; Referee: DH Counsell (Bristol)

11 February 1967 29	Derby County	1 – 1	Cardiff City	Derby
15:00	Kevin Hector (pen.)		Bobby Brown	Stadium: Baseball Ground; Attendance: 14,573

25 February 1967 30	Hull City	1 – 0	Cardiff City	Hull
15:00	Billy Wilkinson 12'			Stadium: Boothferry Park; Attendance: 23,629

4 March 1967 31	Cardiff City	1 – 1	Millwall	Cardiff
15:00	Peter King		36' (o.g.) Don Murray	Stadium: Ninian Park; Attendance: 10,845; Referee: Danny Lyden (Birmingham)

18 March 1967 32	Northampton Town	2 – 0	Cardiff City	Northampton
	Dennis Brown; Frank Large			Stadium: County Ground; Attendance: 11,787

22 March 1967 33	Cardiff City	0 – 0	Portsmouth	Cardiff
19:30				Stadium: Ninian Park; Attendance: 11,727; Referee: Dennis Corbett (Essington, Nr Wolverhampton)

25 March 1967 34	Cardiff City	4 – 1	Plymouth Argyle	Cardiff
15:00	John Toshack 22'; Norman Dean 67'; Barrie Jones 79'; Bobby Brown 81'		33' Richie Reynolds	Stadium: Ninian Park; Attendance: 11,696; Referee: Roger Kirkpatrick (Leicester)

27 March 1967 35	Portsmouth	1 – 2	Cardiff City	Portsmouth
	Ray Hiron		Peter King; Gareth Williams	Stadium: Fratton Park; Attendance: 16,363; Referee: Reg Paine (Hounslow)

1 April 1967 36	Rotherham United	4 – 1	Cardiff City	Rotherham
15:00	Frank Casper 9'; Graham Coldrick 56' (o.g.); Roy Massey 80'; Colin Clish 88'		78' Barrie Jones	Stadium: Millmoor; Attendance: 8,585; Referee: Tommy Dawes (Norwich)

8 April 1967 37	Cardiff City	4 – 0	Preston North End	Cardiff
15:00	Barrie Jones 24'; Peter King 36'; George Ross 89' (o.g.); Bobby Brown 61'			Stadium: Ninian Park; Attendance: 9,630; Referee: Peter Walters (Bridgwater)

15 April 1967 38	Bury	2 – 0	Cardiff City	Bury
15:15	George Jones 6'; Alex Dawson 52'			Stadium: Gigg Lane; Attendance: 6,234

22 April 1967 39	Cardiff City	1 – 1	Coventry City	Cardiff
15:00	Bobby Brown 60'		30' Johnny Key	Stadium: Ninian Park; Attendance: 19,739; Referee: Harry New (Portsmouth)

29 April 1967 40	Norwich City	3 – 2	Cardiff City	Norwich
15:00	Don Heath 20'; Laurie Sheffield 60', 63'		10' Gareth Williams; 89' Norman Dean	Stadium: Carrow Road; Attendance: 14,264

6 May 1967 41	Cardiff City	3 – 0	Birmingham City	Cardiff
15:00	Bobby Brown 3', 8'; Barrie Jones 87'			Stadium: Ninian Park; Attendance: 12,678; Referee: John Homewood (Sunbury-On-Thames)

13 May 1967 42	Huddersfield Town	3 – 1	Cardiff City	Huddersfield
	Kevin McHale; Colin Dobson (pen.); Brian Clark		Bobby Brown	Stadium: Leeds Road; Attendance: 3,847

=== League Cup ===
24 August 1966 1	Cardiff City	1 – 0	Bristol Rovers	Cardiff
19:30	John Toshack			Stadium: Ninian Park; Attendance: 5,574; Referee: Charles Nicholls (Plymouth)

14 September 1966 2	Cardiff City	0 – 1	Exeter City	Cardiff
19:30			Ray Harford	Stadium: Ninian Park; Attendance: 5,384; Referee: David Smith (Stonehouse, Gloucestershire)

=== FA Cup ===
28 January 1967 3	Barnsley	1 – 1	Cardiff City	Barnsley
15:00	Johnny Evans		Ronnie Bird	Stadium: Oakwell; Attendance: 21,464; Referee: Frank Cowen (Oldham)

31 January 1967 3 (Replay)	Cardiff City	2 – 1	Barnsley	Cardiff
19:30	George Johnston (pen.); Peter King		49' Barrie Thomas	Stadium: Ninian Park; Attendance: 21,020; Referee: Ken Burns (Dudley, Worcestershire)

18 February 1967 4	Cardiff City	1 – 1	Manchester City	Cardiff
15:00	Gareth Williams 30'		8' (o.g.) Graham Coldrick	Stadium: Ninian Park; Attendance: 37,205; Referee: Bill Handley (Cannock)

22 February 1967 4 (Replay)	Manchester City	3 – 1	Cardiff City	Manchester
19:30	Neil Young 67'; Johnny Crossan 69' (pen.); Colin Bell 82'		24' (pen.) George Johnston	Stadium: Maine Road; Attendance: 41,616; Referee: Bill Handley (Cannock)

=== Welsh Cup ===
17 January 1967 Round 5	Swansea Town	0 – 4	Cardiff City	Swansea
			Bernie Lewis; Greg Farrell; George Johnston; George Johnston	Stadium: Vetch Field; Attendance: 11,816

8 February 1967 Round 6	Cardiff City	6 – 3	Hereford United	Cardiff
	Peter King; George Johnston; George Johnston; Graham Coldrick; Bobby Ferguson; Bobby Brown		Goal	Stadium: Ninian Park; Attendance: 11,190; Referee: J Marsh (Brecon)

15 March 1967 Semi Final	Newport County	1 – 2	Cardiff City	Newport
19:15	Terry Melling		Bobby Brown; Peter King	Stadium: Somerton Park; Attendance: 8,500; Referee: Leo Callaghan (Merthyr Tydfil)

17 April 1967 Final (First Leg)	Wrexham	2 – 2	Cardiff City	Wrexham
19:15	Bobby Ferguson 10' (o.g.)	Wrexham report	1' Bobby Brown; 25' Peter King	Stadium: The Racecourse; Attendance: 11,437; Referee: WJ Gow (Swansea)

3 May 1967 Final (Second Leg)	Cardiff City	2 – 1 (4 – 3 agg.)	Wrexham	Cardiff
19:30	Norman Dean 25'; George Showell 54' (o.g.)	Wrexham report	8' Albert Kinsey	Stadium: Ninian Park; Attendance: 8,299; Referee: WJ Gow (Swansea)

== See also ==
- List of Cardiff City F.C. seasons
