= 1964–65 Cardiff City F.C. season =

Welsh football club season

Cardiff City
1964–65 season
- Chairman: Fred Dewey
- Manager: Jimmy Scoular
- Football League Second Division: 13th
- FA Cup: 3rd round
- League Cup: 2nd round
- European Cup Winners Cup: Quarter-finals
- Welsh Cup: Winners
- Top goalscorer: League: Ivor Allchurch (15); All: Ivor Allchurch (19)
- Highest home attendance: 16,911 (v Ipswich Town, 22 August 1964)
- Lowest home attendance: 7,427 (v Northampton, 6 February 1965)
- Average home league attendance: 10,588
Home colours

The 1964–65 season was Cardiff City F.C.'s 38th season in the Football League. They competed in the 22-team Division Two, then the second tier of English football, finishing thirteenth.

The season also saw the club compete in European competition for the first time, reaching the semi-finals of the European Cup Winners Cup before being beaten by Spanish side Real Zaragoza.

== Players ==
Note: Flags indicate national team as defined under FIFA eligibility rules; some limited exceptions apply. Players may hold more than one non-FIFA nationality.

No.	Pos.	Nation	Player
--	GK	WAL	Dilwyn John
--	GK	ENG	Bob Wilson
--	DF	WAL	Colin Baker
--	DF	WAL	Mel Charles
--	DF	WAL	Graham Coldrick
--	DF	WAL	Alan Harrington
--	DF	SCO	Gordon Harris
--	DF	SCO	Alec Milne
--	DF	SCO	Don Murray
--	DF	WAL	Trevor Peck
--	DF	WAL	Peter Rodrigues
--	MF	WAL	Doug Curtin
--	MF	SCO	Greg Farrell
--	MF	WAL	Steve Gammon

No.	Pos.	Nation	Player
--	MF	ENG	Roger Green
--	MF	WAL	Barrie Hole
--	MF	WAL	Gerry King
--	MF	ENG	Peter King
--	MF	WAL	Bernie Lewis
--	MF	WAL	Clive Lloyd
--	MF	ENG	Dick Scott
--	MF	ENG	Gareth Williams
--	FW	WAL	Ivor Allchurch
--	FW	WAL	John Charles
--	FW	ENG	Keith Ellis
--	FW	SCO	Tommy Halliday
--	FW	SCO	George Johnston
--	FW	WAL	Derek Tapscott

== League standings ==
Pos	Team	Pld	W	D	L	GF	GA	GAv	Pts	Qualification or relegation
11	Manchester City	42	16	9	17	63	62	1.016	41	
12	Preston North End	42	14	13	15	76	81	0.938	41	
13	Cardiff City	42	13	14	15	64	57	1.123	40	Qualification for the European Cup Winners' Cup first round (Note: Cardiff City qualified for the European Cup Winners' Cup as the 1964–65 Welsh Cup winners.)
14	Rotherham United	42	14	12	16	70	69	1.014	40	
15	Plymouth Argyle	42	16	8	18	63	79	0.797	40	

Rules for classification: 1) Points; 2) Goal average; 3) Goals scored

=== Results by round ===
Round	1	2	3	4	5	6	7	8	9	10	11	12	13	14	15	16	17	18	19	20	21	22	23	24	25	26	27	28	29	30	31	32	33	34	35	36	37	38	39	40	41	42
Ground	H	H	A	A	H	A	H	H	A	A	A	H	A	H	A	H	A	H	A	H	A	H	A	H	A	H	A	A	H	A	H	A	H	H	A	H	H	A	H	A	H	A
Result	D	D	L	D	L	D	D	D	L	L	L	W	D	W	L	W	W	W	D	L	D	W	L	W	L	L	D	L	W	L	D	D	D	L	W	W	D	L	W	W	W	L
Position			17	13	18	18	19	17	19	19	22	22	22	20	22	18	17	14	14	16	17	13	15	14	18	18	17	19	17	17	16	16	16	17	16	15	15	15	15	13	12	13
Points	1	2	2	3	3	4	5	6	6	6	6	8	9	11	11	13	15	17	18	18	19	21	21	23	23	23	24	24	26	26	27	28	29	29	31	33	34	34	36	38	40	40

Source: Competitive matches
A = Away; H = Home; W = Win; D = Draw; L = Loss

== Fixtures and results ==
=== Second Division ===
22 August 1964 1	Cardiff City	0 – 0	Ipswich Town	Cardiff
15:15				Stadium: Ninian Park; Attendance: 16,911; Referee: KJ Seddon (Southport)

26 August 1964 2	Cardiff City	3 – 3	Preston North End	Cardiff
19:15	Ivor Allchurch; Ivor Allchurch; Bernie Lewis		Howard Kendall; Brian Godfrey; Alan Spavin	Stadium: Ninian Park; Attendance: 15,805; Referee: Eric Jennings (Stourbridge)

29 August 1964 3	Plymouth Argyle	3 – 1	Cardiff City	Plymouth
	Frank Lord (40s); Duncan Neale 49'; Mike Trebilcock 83'		68' (pen.) Barrie Hole	Stadium: Home Park; Attendance: 14,585; Referee: GWT Davis

31 August 1964 4	Preston North End	1 – 1	Cardiff City	Preston
	Brian Godfrey		Ivor Allchurch	Stadium: Deepdale; Attendance: 23,303

5 September 1964 5	Cardiff City	1 – 3	Bolton Wanderers	Cardiff
15:15	Ivor Allchurch 45'		8' Freddie Hill; 21' Barry Fry; 27' (o.g.) John Charles	Stadium: Ninian Park; Attendance: 13,501

12 September 1964 6	Middlesbrough	0 – 0	Cardiff City	Middlesbrough
15:00				Stadium: Ayresome Park; Attendance: 22,770; Referee: E Norman (Blackburn)

16 September 1964 7	Cardiff City	1 – 1	Huddersfield Town	Cardiff
19:15	Barrie Hole (pen.)		Len White	Stadium: Ninian Park; Attendance: 9,392

19 September 1964 8	Cardiff City	1 – 1	Newcastle United	Cardiff
15:15	Ivor Allchurch 25'		66' Bobby Cummings	Stadium: Ninian Park; Attendance: 11,826; Referee: Peter Bye (Bedford)

26 September 1964 9	Northampton Town	1 – 0	Cardiff City	Northampton
15:00	Mike Everitt			Stadium: County Ground; Attendance: 12,328; Referee: Ken Burns (Dudley, Worcestershire)

29 September 1964 10	Huddersfield Town	3 – 1	Cardiff City	Huddersfield
	Kevin Lewis; Derek Stokes; Kevin McHale		Ivor Allchurch	Stadium: Leeds Road; Attendance: 5,640

6 October 1964 11	Rotherham United	3 – 1	Cardiff City	Rotherham
	Ken Houghton (??)		Keith Ellis	Stadium: Millmoor; Attendance: 12,601

10 October 1964 12	Cardiff City	2 – 1	Derby County	Cardiff
15:15	Peter King; Derek Tapscott		Eddie Thomas	Stadium: Ninian Park; Attendance: 8,302

17 October 1964 13	Swindon Town	3 – 3	Cardiff City	Swindon
15:00	Ken Skeen 7'; Mike Summerbee 36'; Peter Leggett 64'	Swindon report	55' (pen.) Barrie Hole; 68', 79' Mel Charles	Stadium: County Ground; Attendance: 15,937; Referee: Jack Taylor (Wolverhampton)

24 October 1964 14	Cardiff City	1 – 0	Portsmouth	Cardiff
15:15	Derek Tapscott 30'			Stadium: Ninian Park; Attendance: 8,696; Referee: Vernon Batty (Cheshire)

31 October 1964 15	Manchester City	2 – 0	Cardiff City	Manchester
	Jimmy Murray; Jimmy Murray			Stadium: Maine Road; Attendance: 13,146

7 November 1964 16	Cardiff City	2 – 1	Charlton Athletic	Cardiff
15:15	Keith Ellis 49', 67'		73' Eddie Firmani	Stadium: Ninian Park; Attendance: 9,616; Referee: Danny Lyden (Birmingham)

14 November 1964 17	Leyton Orient	1 – 3	Cardiff City	London
15:00	Terry McDonald 23'		62', 90' Keith Ellis; 80' Bernie Lewis	Stadium: Brisbane Road; Attendance: 6,350; Referee: J Mitchell

21 November 1964 18	Cardiff City	4 – 0	Bury	Cardiff
15:15	Derek Tapscott 11', 31'; Keith Ellis 43'; Bernie Lewis 88'			Stadium: Ninian Park; Attendance: 9,883; Referee: Reg Paine (Middlesex)

28 November 1964 19	Crystal Palace	0 – 0	Cardiff City	London
				Stadium: Selhurst Park; Attendance: 18,188

5 December 1964 20	Cardiff City	1 – 3	Norwich City	Cardiff
15:15	Barry Butler 50' (o.g.)		18' Gordon Bolland; 34' Ron Davies; 89' Gerry Mannion	Stadium: Ninian Park; Attendance: 9,877; Referee: Jim Pickles (Stockport)

12 December 1964 21	Ipswich Town	1 – 1	Cardiff City	Ipswich
	Gerry Baker		Keith Ellis	Stadium: Portman Road; Attendance: 10,010; Referee: DA Corbett (Essington, Nr Wolverhampton)

19 December 1964 22	Cardiff City	4 – 0	Plymouth Argyle	Cardiff
15:15	Derek Tapscott; Derek Tapscott; Duncan Neale (o.g.); Peter Rodrigues			Stadium: Ninian Park; Attendance: 9,555; Referee: Jim Finney (Hereford)

26 December 1964 23	Swansea Town	3 – 2	Cardiff City	Swansea
	Keith Todd; Jim McLaughlin; Ken Pound		Keith Ellis; Keith Ellis	Stadium: Vetch Field; Attendance: 17,875; Referee: Bill Clements (West Bromwich)

15 January 1965 24	Cardiff City	6 – 1	Middlesbrough	Cardiff
19:30	Peter King 5', 10', 70'; Derek Tapscott 55', 85'; Gareth Williams 70'		28' Jimmy Irvine	Stadium: Ninian Park; Attendance: 9,490

23 January 1965 25	Newcastle United	2 – 0	Cardiff City	Newcastle
	Dave Hilley 44'; Stan Anderson 62'			Stadium: St James' Park; Attendance: 37,291

6 February 1965 26	Cardiff City	0 – 2	Northampton Town	Cardiff
15:15			Bobby Brown; Bobby Brown	Stadium: Ninian Park; Attendance: 7,427; Referee: A Edge (Liverpool)

13 February 1965 27	Southampton	1 – 1	Cardiff City	Southampton
15:00	George O'Brien		Ivor Allchurch	Stadium: The Dell; Attendance: 14,740; Referee: Reg Paine (Southall)

20 February 1965 28	Derby County	1 – 0	Cardiff City	Derby
	Ron Webster			Stadium: Baseball Ground; Attendance: 10,894

27 February 1965 29	Cardiff City	2 – 0	Swindon Town	Cardiff
15:15	Keith Ellis 57'; Barrie Hole 70'	Swindon report		Stadium: Ninian Park; Attendance: 9,197; Referee: Jack Taylor (Wolverhampton)

6 March 1965 30	Norwich City	2 – 1	Cardiff City	Norwich
	Ron Davies 8'; Tommy Bryceland 68'		5' Ivor Allchurch	Stadium: Carrow Road; Attendance: 18,036; Referee: BS Setchell (Luton)

12 March 1965 31	Cardiff City	2 – 2	Manchester City	Cardiff
19:30	Ivor Allchurch; Peter King		Dave Connor; Matt Gray	Stadium: Ninian Park; Attendance: 9,094; Referee: ED Wallace (Swindon)

22 March 1965 32	Charlton Athletic	2 – 2	Cardiff City	London
	Keith Peacock 48'; Eddie Firmani 57'		69', 82' Gareth Williams	Stadium: The Valley; Attendance: 7,710; Referee: Ken Dagnall (Lancashire)

24 March 1965 33	Cardiff City	2 – 2	Southampton	Cardiff
19:30	Gareth Williams; John Charles		George O'Brien; Martin Chivers	Stadium: Ninian Park; Attendance: 9,642; Referee: DFC Wells (Luton)

27 March 1965 34	Cardiff City	0 – 2	Leyton Orient	Cardiff
15:15			4' (pen.) Harry Gregory; 79' Joe Elwood	Stadium: Ninian Park; Attendance: 7,627; Referee: Peter Brandwood (Kidderminster)

3 April 1965 35	Bury	1 – 2	Cardiff City	Bury
	Alec Alston 29'		38' Peter King; 53' Barrie Hole	Stadium: Gigg Lane; Attendance: 4,292; Referee: K Howley (Billingham)

6 April 1965 36	Cardiff City	5 – 0	Swansea Town	Cardiff
19:30	Ivor Allchurch 6', 19', 75'; John Charles 83', 89'			Stadium: Ninian Park; Attendance: 15,896; Referee: David Smith (Stonehouse)

10 April 1965 37	Cardiff City	0 – 0	Crystal Palace	Cardiff
15:15				Stadium: Ninian Park; Attendance: 9,585; Referee: Norman Matthews (Oxon)

17 April 1965 38	Portsmouth	1 – 0	Cardiff City	Portsmouth
	Cliff Portwood 36'			Stadium: Fratton Park; Attendance: 13,275

19 April 1965 39	Cardiff City	3 – 1	Coventry City	Cardiff
19:30	Peter King 28'; Ivor Allchurch 38', 52'	Sky Blue archive	44' Ron Farmer	Stadium: Ninian Park; Attendance: 11,228; Referee: G Martin (Whitchurch, Hampshire)

20 April 1965 40	Coventry City	0 – 2	Cardiff City	Coventry
19:30		Sky Blue archive	6' Bernie Lewis; 47' Barrie Hole	Stadium: Highfield Road; Attendance: 23,913; Referee: JA (Jim) Cattlin (Rochdale)

24 April 1965 41	Cardiff City	3 – 2	Rotherham United	Cardiff
15:15	Ivor Allchurch 41'; Peter Rodrigues 48'; Peter King 65'		20', 84' Roy Massey	Stadium: Ninian Park; Attendance: 9,794; Referee: Ken Burns (Stourbridge)

28 April 1965 42	Bolton Wanderers	1 – 0	Cardiff City	Bolton
15:00	Dave Hatton			Stadium: Burnden Park; Attendance: 6,498; Referee: GW Grundy (Grimsby)

=== League Cup ===
23 September 1964 1	Southampton	3 – 2	Cardiff City	Southampton
	Terry Paine; George O'Brien (?)		Bernie Lewis; Peter King	Stadium: The Dell; Attendance: 13,076

=== FA Cup ===
9 January 1965 3	Cardiff City	1 – 2	Charlton Athletic	Cardiff
15:00	Derek Tapscott 74'		47' Frank Haydock; 69' Mike Bailey	Stadium: Ninian Park; Attendance: 13,500; Referee: Les Hamer (Bolton)

=== European Cup Winners Cup ===
9 September 1964 1 (First Leg)	Esbjerg	0 – 0	Cardiff City	Esbjerg
				Stadium: Esbjerg Stadium; Attendance: 7,093; Referee: Joseph Hannet (Belgium)

13 October 1964 1 (Second Leg)	Cardiff City	1 – 0 (1 – 0 agg.)	Esbjerg	Cardiff
19:30	Peter King 57'			Stadium: Ninian Park; Attendance: 8,784; Referee: Vital Loraux (Belgium)

15 December 1964 2 (First Leg)	Sporting CP	1 – 2	Cardiff City	Lisbon
21:15	Ernesto Figueiredo 81'		31' Greg Farrell; 65' Derek Tapscott	Stadium: Estadio Jose Alvalade; Attendance: 15,311; Referee: Rudolf Kreitlein (Germany)

23 December 1964 2 (Second Leg)	Cardiff City	0 – 0 (2 – 1 agg.)	Sporting CP	Cardiff
19:30				Stadium: Ninian Park; Attendance: 23,800; Referee: Robert Schaut (Belgium)

20 January 1965 3 (First Leg)	Real Zaragoza	2 – 2	Cardiff City	Zaragoza
	Carlos Lapetra 2'; Antonio Pais 10'		15' Gareth Williams; 38' Peter King	Stadium: La Romareda; Attendance: 22,780; Referee: Othmar Huber (Switzerland)

3 February 1965 3 (Second Leg)	Cardiff City	0 – 1 (2 – 3 agg.)	Real Zaragoza	Cardiff
19:30			75' Canario	Stadium: Ninian Park; Attendance: 38,458; Referee: Andre Hauben (Belgium)

=== Welsh Cup ===
26 January 1965 5	Merthyr Tydfil	1 – 3	Cardiff City	Merthyr Tydfil
	Goal		Peter King; Peter King; Derek Tapscott	Stadium: Penydarren Park; Attendance: 6,000

17 February 1965 6	Cardiff City	3 – 1	Hereford United	Cardiff
19:30	Ivor Allchurch; Keith Ellis; Greg Farrell (pen.)		Goal	Stadium: Ninian Park; Attendance: 8,000

10 March 1965 Semi Final	Swansea Town	0 – 1	Cardiff City	Newport
19:15			(pen.) Greg Farrell	Stadium: Somerton Park; Attendance: 7,500; Referee: GT Powell (Newport)

12 April 1965 Final (First Leg)	Cardiff City	5 – 1	Wrexham	Cardiff
19:30	George Johnston 34', 90'; Ivor Allchurch 50'; Peter King 67', 89'	Wrexham report	44' (o.g.) Don Murray	Stadium: Ninian Park; Attendance: 7,412; Referee: J Lowry (Neath)

26 April 1965 Final (Second Leg)	Wrexham	1 – 0	Cardiff City	Wrexham
19:15	Martin King 7'	Wrexham report		Stadium: The Racecourse; Attendance: 6,659; Referee: J Lowry (Neath)

5 May 1965 Final (Replay)	Wrexham	0 – 3	Cardiff City	Shrewsbury
19:30		Wrexham report	6', 38' Ivor Allchurch; 47' (o.g.) Ray Mielczarek	Stadium: Gay Meadow; Attendance: 7,840; Referee: J Lowry (Neath)

== See also ==
- List of Cardiff City F.C. seasons
