= South Wales derby =

Football derby between Cardiff City and Swansea City

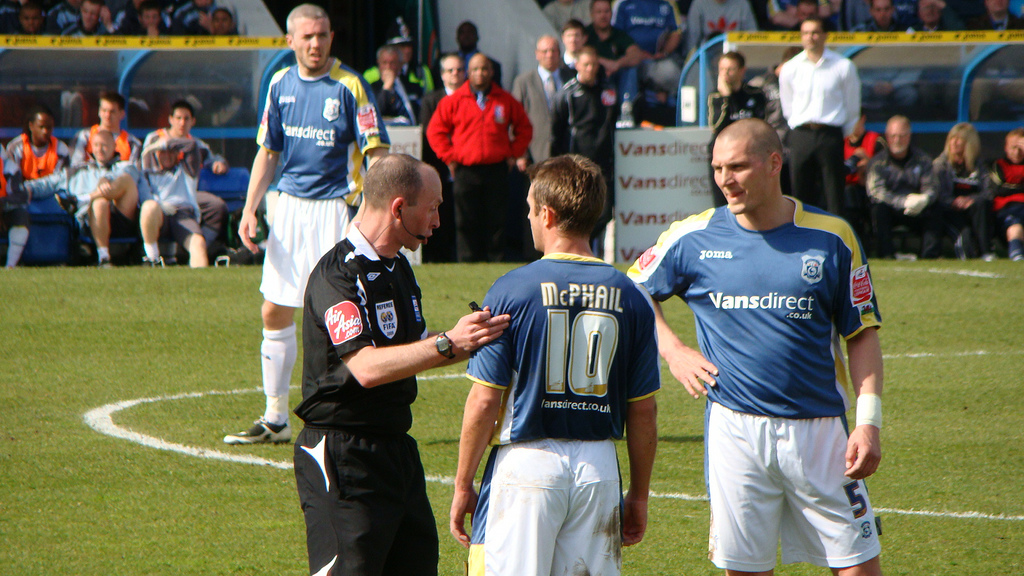
- Referee Mike Dean speaks with Cardiff City's Stephen McPhail and Darren Purse during the final South Wales derby played at Ninian Park, April 2009.
- Location: South Wales
- Teams: Cardiff City; Swansea City
- First meeting: 7 September 1912; Swansea Town 1–1 Cardiff City
- Latest meeting: 18 January 2025; Championship; Cardiff City 3–0 Swansea City
- Next meeting: 29 November 2026; Championship; Swansea City v Cardiff City
- Stadiums: Cardiff City Stadium (Cardiff City); Swansea.com Stadium (Swansea City)

Statistics
- Total meetings: 119
- Most wins: Cardiff City (47)
- Most player appearances: Roger Freestone (19)
- Top scorer: Brayley Reynolds (8)
- All-time series: Cardiff: 47; Draw: 29; Swansea: 43
- Largest victory: Cardiff City 5–0 Swansea Town (6 April 1965)

The South Wales derby (Welsh: darbi De Cymru) is a local derby between Welsh association football clubs Cardiff City and Swansea City. The fixture has been described by The Independent as one of the fiercest rivalries in British football. Although based in Wales, both clubs play in the English football league system and have won English honours: Cardiff the FA Cup in 1927 and Swansea the Football League Cup in 2013.

The first meeting between the two sides took place in 1912, in Swansea's first competitive fixture, and ended in a draw. In the pre-war era, the derby was played infrequently, particularly in the league with only eight meetings between the sides from 1912 to 1945 as the clubs were rarely in the same division. After the Second World War, football attendances rose significantly and the first derby attracted a record crowd of more than 57,000 in 1949. These high attendances continued through the 1950s, including the first derby played in a Welsh Cup final in 1956 which set a record attendance for a match in the competition. Attendances began to fall at the start of the 1960s following a downturn in the fortunes of both teams.

The 1970s saw only five derby matches, all in the Welsh Cup, before Swansea enjoyed a resurgence under the management of John Toshack in the early 1980s. However, by the end of the decade and the early 1990s, the derby became blighted by hooliganism which led to the fixture becoming the first in Britain to ban away fans from attending. The derby experienced a resurgence at the start of the 21st century, with both teams reaching the Championship before eventually meeting in the top tier of English football in the Premier League for the first time in 2013 which Cardiff went on to win.

The clubs have played each other more than 110 times in all competitions. Having begun as a friendly rivalry, the relationship between the two sides deteriorated after the 1960s which led to several high profile, violent clashes between supporters that gained the fixture a reputation as one of Britain's fiercest rivalries. Goalkeeper Roger Freestone has appeared in more derbies between the two sides than any other player, making 19 appearances for Swansea in the fixture during his career. Brayley Reynolds scored eight times for Swansea in derby matches, more than any other player. The most recent South Wales derby took place on 18 January 2025 in the EFL Championship, ending in a 3–0 win for Cardiff City at the Cardiff City Stadium.

== History ==
=== Southern Football League ===
Chart showing relative league positions of Cardiff and Swansea in the English Football League

Cardiff City was formed in 1899 as Riverside A.F.C. by members of a local cricket club. The team competed in the amateur leagues before gaining entry into the Southern Football League and turning professional in 1910. With growing interest in association football in the traditionally rugby union stronghold of Swansea, the decision was taken to form a club. Swansea Town was founded in 1912 and gained admission into the Second Division of the Southern Football League alongside Cardiff. The two clubs faced each other for the first time on 7 September 1912, in Swansea's first competitive fixture, with the match ending in a 1–1 draw; Billy Ball gave the Swans the lead before Cardiff captain John Burton equalised. Swansea went on to claim the first victory between the two sides five months later when they defeated Cardiff 4–2 in the semi-final of the Welsh Cup despite trailing 2–0 at half time. Cardiff lost two players to injury in the second half in a time when substitutes were not permitted, ending the match with nine players. Such was the friendliness between the two sides in the early meetings that when Burton scored a bicycle kick in the match, several of his opponents stopped to shake hands with him in appreciation of the goal.

Cardiff were promoted to the First Division of the Southern Football League at the end of the 1912–13 season. Although the clubs met in the fourth qualifying round of the FA Cup the following season, it would be the last competitive fixture between the two sides for six years as the Southern Football League was suspended during the First World War. Two friendlies were played in April 1919 as the clubs began to prepare for a return of competitive football at the end of hostilities with both sides winning a match each. The popularity of the derby quickly became obvious as the first post First World War league fixture attracted a season high crowd of 15,500 for Swansea, who claimed a 2–1 victory, while Cardiff recorded its first victory in the return fixture on 7 February 1920, defeating the Swans 1–0 at Ninian Park following George Beare's goal. The second fixture was attended by 24,317 spectators, the largest crowd ever recorded in the Southern League at the time. A friendly was also held in October 1919 as a benefit match for Cardiff's trainer George Latham who captained his side for the fixture in a 1–1 draw.

=== Pre-war and wartime ===
In 1920, in order to expand, the Football League absorbed the teams from the First Division of the Southern League. Swansea were placed into the newly created Football League Third Division but Cardiff were granted a place in the Football League Second Division after winning an election vote. The split resulted in the two sides facing each other only three times between 1920 and 1929, all of which came in the Welsh Cup. Cardiff enjoyed one of the most successful periods in the club's history during the 1920s, winning the 1927 FA Cup Final and finishing as runners-up in both the 1925 final and the First Division in 1923–24. In the 1920s the rivalry was more friendly; there are accounts of Swansea fans travelling to the 1927 FA Cup final in support of their neighbouring rivals. A goodwill message was also forwarded to the Cardiff team from Swansea ahead of the match. Cardiff were relegated to the Second Division in 1929. This resulted in the first league meetings between the two sides for 11 years, a goalless draw in October of that year. A benefit match for several Swansea players was held in April 1930 at Vetch Field and resulted in a 6–2 victory for the home side as Ronnie Williams scored five of his side's goals.

Cardiff were relegated again in 1932, dropping into the Football League Third Division South. As a result, the derby was only played a further four times before the outbreak of the Second World War; the clubs were drawn against each other twice in the Welsh Cup, with both ties requiring a replay to decide a winner. In the pre-war era, the Welsh Cup provided more meetings between the two sides than league competition with 10 derbies being played in the Welsh Cup between 1912 and 1939, two more meetings than in league fixtures. The last competitive pre-war derby took place on 23 February 1939 as Cardiff defeated Swansea 4–1 in the fifth round of the Welsh Cup following braces from Harry Egan and Tex Rickards.

With football restricted during wartime, the close proximity of the two sides led to them being grouped together in regional wartime leagues. The first wartime fixture was played in August 1939 under the guise of a charity match for the Jubilee Benevolent Fund. For the 1939–40 season Cardiff and Swansea were placed in the South-West Region and played out a 2–2 draw in their first meeting. In total, the teams met 42 times during wartime. Cardiff dominated competition during this period, winning 30 of the 42 meetings. This included an 8–0 victory for Cardiff in a match that was dubbed the "Bluebirds Blitzkrieg" following hat tricks from Beriah Moore and Billy James.

=== Post-war ===
When the Football League resumed in the 1946–47 season, Cardiff won promotion from the Third Division South at the expense of Swansea who were relegated to the same division. Despite this, Cardiff manager Billy McCandless chose to leave the club to join Swansea after receiving a lucrative offer from the rival side. McCandless led Swansea back to the Second Division in 1949, resulting in the first post-war meeting of the sides on 27 August. The match was also the first league meeting between the two sides for 19 years, the longest gap between league matches in the derby's history. With football enjoying a post-war attendance boom, more than 60,000 tickets were sold although only 57,510 spectators were recorded through the turnstiles at the match. The figure is the biggest crowd ever recorded for a South Wales derby in which Cardiff claimed a 1–0 victory through a goal by Tommy Best. The original ticket sales of 60,855 would have also been a club record for both sides; Cardiff's record home attendance is instead 57,893 against Arsenal four years later. The return fixture, in December of the same year, also saw Swansea record its highest ever derby attendance with 27,264 spectators witnessing Swansea win 5–1.

In 1955, Cardiff was named as the capital city of Wales. The decision, along with the perceived favouritism from UK governments believed to have been shown to the city since has been credited as the starting point of the deterioration of relations between the two sides. In 1956, the South Wales derby was played in the final of the Welsh Cup in front of a crowd of 37,500 at Ninian Park. The attendance remains the highest ever recorded in the Welsh Cup. Cardiff went on to win the match 3–2 despite being reduced to ten men within the opening 30 minutes when forward Gerry Hitchens suffered a broken leg. The following year, Cardiff recorded its first victory over Swansea at Vetch Field, winning 1–0 following a goal from Colin Hudson. The next meeting between the sides, in March 1959, resulted in Swansea achieving the same feat by winning at their rivals home ground for the first time in league competition. Mel Nurse scored the only goal of the game from a penalty, the first league goal Swansea had scored at Ninian Park.

Before the 1960s the rivalry was a typically a friendly one and many fans held no animosity towards their Welsh rivals. In the area between the two cities, some fans supported both teams and matches between the sides in the post-war decade often saw opposing fans standing alongside each other on the terraces. The 1960s saw that change as football culture became more aggressive and local rivalries became more important than shared regional identities. The earliest trouble of note between the two teams occurred in February 1960 during a Welsh Cup sixth round tie. Cardiff were due to play a league match two days later and approached the Football Association of Wales (FAW) to postpone the match. The request was denied and in response, Cardiff manager Bill Jones named a reserve side for the fixture. Despite fielding a weakened team, Cardiff went on to win the tie 2–1 in a match that saw several confrontations. Cardiff's Colin Hudson was sent off for a foul with ten minutes remaining before his teammate Steve Mokone and Swansea's Harry Griffiths were also dismissed after wrestling each other to the ground and throwing mud in retaliation. The FAW subsequently fined Cardiff £350 for fielding a weakened side in the competition and warned the club against doing so again in future. Swansea historian Gwyn Rees has stated that fans' animosity began to increase in the late 1960s, citing the 1969 Welsh Cup final as a turning point. The match was the first derby that saw notable issues of violence between the two sets of supporters. At the end of the 1969–70 season, Swansea Town changed its name to Swansea City after the area was granted city status.

=== Lower divisions and hooliganism ===
The appointment of John Toshack as Swansea manager in the late 1970s caused further rift between the clubs. Toshack had been born in Cardiff and began his career with the side but his subsequent success with the Swans, winning promotion from the Fourth Division to the First Division during his tenure, saw the balance of power in South Wales shift. Having only played each other five times during the 1970s, all in the Welsh Cup, the two sides met in a league fixture for the first time in for 15 years in 1980. Swansea recorded a 2–1 victory with goals coming from two former Cardiff players, Toshack, in his role as player-manager, and David Giles.

With the escalation of football hooliganism in the United Kingdom in the 1980s, the derbies became plagued by violence led largely by hooligan firms from both sides, Cardiff's Soul Crew and Swansea's Jacks. In September 1988, after seeing their side win in Swansea, a group of around 10 Cardiff fans were chased into the sea near Swansea Civic Centre by a group of around 100 Swansea fans. Since then, Swansea fans have adopted a "swim away" gesture, in reference to the event. During an FA Cup fixture in 1992, 39 fans were arrested at Swansea's Vetch Field after clashes between supporters. Significant damage was caused to local shops as well as public transport; John Williams, who played for both sides during his career, described how fans "would fight in the streets, the train station and all the way down the motorway. The fans wanted to show they were the better city."

On 22 December 1993, a match between the two sides was dubbed 'The Battle of Ninian Park' after violence erupted. The start of the match was delayed for 40 minutes as police attempted to control the rival fans. Swansea fans were placed in the grandstand for the game, seated alongside sections of Ninian Park usually frequented by families. As Cardiff took the lead, Swansea fans began ripping out seats and throwing them at Cardiff supporters, which resulted in the home fans invading the pitch in an attempt to reach the away section. Police were forced to use mounted officers and dog handlers to regain control. The following day national news showing pictures of the violence shocked the nation, with The Times reporting that "at one point several hundred people were brawling on the pitch". The violence led the FAW to ban away fans from this fixture for several years, the first fixture in Britain to do so. Simon Chivers, a fan who attended the match and went on to become an intelligence officer on hooligan firms for South Wales Police, described the scenes at the match as "the worst violence I have ever seen anywhere in my entire life."

With the two teams in the Third Division, the 1990s saw frequent derby matches and several meetings in cup competitions, although poor results and frequent crowd trouble saw attendances drop; both sides recorded their lowest derby attendances in league competition between 1994 and 1996. Further political divide between the two cities was caused by the Welsh devolution referendum in 1997 when Cardiff was chosen as the site for the newly created Senedd, despite the majority of the city voting against devolution. Swansea, which largely voted in favour of devolution, received funding for a national swimming pool instead. Alan Curtis, who played for both sides, commented, "I think Cardiff has always been perceived [...] to receive whatever funding is going around. It seems to me that everything gets channelled in that direction". Away fans were eventually allowed to attend the fixture again in 1997 under strict monitoring and the introduction of 'bubble' trips, where away fans are escorted in and out of the stadium by police. The two teams were split in 1999 through promotions and relegation. Although they met in a FAW Premier Cup final in 2002, the two sides did not meet in the league for ten years. Despite this, the rivalry still attracted attention; during their celebrations after winning the Football League Trophy in 2006, Swansea players Lee Trundle and Alan Tate brandished a Welsh flag with an anti-Cardiff message and Trundle also wore a T-shirt with an image of a Swansea City player urinating on a Cardiff City shirt. The FAW stated that the images paraded at the match, which took place at Cardiff's Millennium Stadium, were "of an extremely offensive and insulting nature". The two players were arrested for public order offences, fined £2,000 and handed one-match suspensions. A heavy police presence was also required when Swansea fans travelled to Cardiff when they played at the Millennium Stadium in the Football League Trophy final in 2006.

=== New eras ===
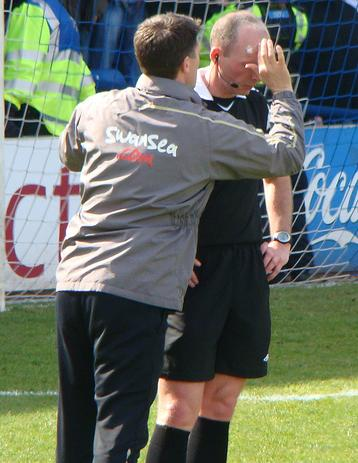
Referee Mike Dean receiving treatment after being struck by a projectile in a 2009 South Wales derby

The first derby in just under a decade took place in the League Cup on 23 September 2008, with Swansea winning 1–0. The match saw sets of supporters from both clubs clash with police after the match. A league fixture, on 5 April 2009 at Ninian Park, was marred by referee Mike Dean being hit in the head by a coin thrown from the crowd, as well as Cardiff fans clashing with police after the match. The following season, on 7 November 2009, at the Liberty Stadium Swansea claimed a 3–2 victory in a match that again saw crowd disturbances as hundreds of Swansea fans waited outside the ground for the Cardiff fans to depart. This resulted in a total of fifteen arrests being made during and after the match. Cardiff fans also vandalised the North Stand in which they were placed for the game for the second year in a row. Seats and toilets were vandalised, pipe work ripped from walls and doors broken in the away fans' area. The damage was reported to cost thousands of pounds. However, police praised the majority of supporters for their behaviour before, during and after the game which was attended by more than 18,000 fans.

Swansea achieved promotion to the Premier League in 2011, becoming the first Welsh team to do so and the first Welsh side in the top division of English football since Swansea were relegated from the First Division in 1983. Cardiff also gained promotion in 2013. As a result, the first South Wales derby to be played in England's top division took place during the 2013–14 season. Cardiff won the first ever top tier meeting between the sides 1–0 on 3 November 2013, thanks to a headed goal from former Swansea defender Steven Caulker. Swansea went on to win the return fixture 3–0 in February 2014, but Cardiff's relegation at the end of the season saw the two sides separated again. The derby was not played for a further five years as the two clubs swapped leagues before both returned to the Championship for the 2019–20 season with Swansea winning the first meeting 1–0.

In October 2021, Swansea won 3–0 against Cardiff City. Later in the season, Swansea beat Cardiff 4–0 in the reverse fixture; Swansea became the first side to complete the league double in the derby's 110-year history. Swansea also won both fixtures in the 2022–23 season making them the first team to win four in a row.

In the 2023–24 season, Cardiff ended the streak with a 2–0 victory over Swansea at home, before Swansea won the reverse fixture 2–0. In the latter fixture, Matt Grimes became the first Swansea City player to captain the side to 7 victories over Cardiff.

== Record ==
As of 18 January 2025

Competition	Total matches	Cardiff wins	Draw	Swansea wins
Football League / Premier League	68	22	18	28
FA Cup	2	0	0	2
League Cup	5	2	0	3
Associate Members' Cup / EFL Trophy	4	1	1	2
Welsh Cup	34	19	8	7
FAW Premier Cup	2	2	0	0
Southern Football League	4	1	2	1
Total	119	47	29	43

== Results ==
Key to divisions:

- SFL Division 1 = Southern Football League First Division
- SFL Division 2 = Southern Football League Second Division
- Division 1 = Football League First Division
- Division 2 = Football League Second Division
- Division 3 = Football League Third Division
- Division 4 = Football League Fourth Division
- Championship = EFL Championship

Key to rounds:

- QR = Qualifying round
- R1 = Round 1
- R2 = Round 2
- R3 = Round 3
- R4 = Round 4
- R5 = Round 5
- QF = Quarter-finals
- SF = Semi-finals
- F = Final

- a.e.t. = After extra time
- pen. = Penalty kick
- o.g. = Own goal

Key to colours and abbreviations: Cardiff City win Swansea City win Draw

Date	Competition	Stadium	Score	Cardiff City scorers	Swansea City scorers	Attendance
7 September 1912	SFL Division 2	Vetch Field	1–1	Jack Burton	Ball	8,000
15 February 1913	Welsh Cup SF	Ninian Park	4–2	Cassidy (pen), Burton	Ball (2), Grierson, Coleman	12,000
15 March 1913	SFL Division 2	Ninian Park	0–0			10,000
29 November 1913	FA Cup 4QR	Vetch Field	2–0		Messer, Weir	12,000
27 September 1919	SFL Division 1	Vetch Field	2–1	Evans	Sheldon (2)	15,500
7 February 1920	SFL Division 1	Ninian Park	1–0	Beare		24,371
24 March 1920	Welsh Cup SF	Ninian Park	2–1	Evans, West	Beynon	7,000
21 April 1923	Welsh Cup SF	Vetch Field	3–2	Davies, Clennell (2)	Smith, Thompson	12,000
2 March 1925	Welsh Cup R5	Vetch Field	4–0		Thompson (2), Whitehead (2)	15,000
2 April 1928	Welsh Cup R6	Ninian Park	1–0	Smith		10,000
5 October 1929	Division 2	Ninian Park	0–0			29,093
8 February 1930	Division 2	Vetch Field	1–0		Lindsay	22,121
2 April 1930	Welsh Cup R6	Ninian Park	4–0	Thirlaway, Jones, Davies, Nelson		8,000
30 August 1930	Division 2	Vetch Field	3–2	Ralph Williams (2)	Easton, Ron Williams (2)	20,363
27 December 1930	Division 2	Ninian Park	1–0	L. Jones		24,232
9 March 1933	Welsh Cup 8R	Vetch Field	1–1	Maidment	Blair	3,000
15 March 1933	Welsh Cup 8R (replay)	Ninian Park	2–1	Maidment, Jones	Martin	5,000
8 February 1939	Welsh Cup R5	Ninian Park	2–2	Mckenzie, McCaughey	Olsen, Bamford	4,000
23 February 1939	Welsh Cup R5 (replay)	Vetch Field	4–1	Egan (2), Rickards (2)	Imrie	1,500
27 August 1949	Division 2	Ninian Park	1–0	Best		57,893
24 December 1949	Division 2	Vetch Field	5–1	Stitfall	Lucas (2), McCrory, O'Driscoll (2)	27,264
23 February 1950	Welsh Cup R5	Vetch Field	3–0		Richards, Scrine (2)	10,000
4 November 1950	Division 2	Vetch Field	1–0		Lucas	26,224
24 March 1951	Division 2	Ninian Park	1–0	Marchant		41,074
25 December 1951	Division 2	Vetch Field	1–1	Tiddy	Baker (o.g.)	19,260
26 December 1951	Division 2	Ninian Park	3–0	Baker, Grant, Tiddy		46,003
30 April 1956	Welsh Cup F	Ninian Park	3–2	Walsh (2), McSeveney	Kiley, Palmer	37,500
24 August 1957	Division 2	Ninian Park	0–0			42,482
21 December 1957	Division 2	Vetch Field	1–0	Hudson		19,483
7 March 1959	Division 2	Ninian Park	1–0		Nurse	24,450
15 April 1959	Division 2	Vetch Field	3–1	Kelly (2), Nurse (o.g.)	Webster	14,893
7 November 1959	Division 2	Ninian Park	2–1	Sullivan, Bonson	Webster	34,881
2 February 1960	Welsh Cup R6	Vetch Field	2–1	Woods (o.g.), Knowles	Reynolds	11,000
26 March 1960	Division 2	Vetch Field	3–3	Joe Bonson, Moore, Walsh	Reynolds (2), Hale	24,004
22 March 1961	Welsh Cup SF	Somerton Park, Newport	1–1	Tapscott	Reynolds	10,470
28 March 1961	Welsh Cup SF (replay)	Stebonheath Park, Llanelli	2–1	Tapscott	Reynolds (2)	11,965
4 September 1962	Division 2	Vetch Field	2–1	Charles	Williams, Thomas	24,687
15 September 1962	Division 2	Ninian Park	5–2	P Davies (o.g.), Charles (2), McIntosh, Hooper	Williams (2)	23,454
11 April 1963	Welsh Cup R6	Vetch Field	2–0		Jones, Thomas	11,500
19 October 1963	Division 2	Ninian Park	1–1	Scott (pen.)	Evans	21,417
28 March 1964	Division 2	Vetch Field	3–0		Draper, Reynolds (2)	18,721
26 December 1964	Division 2	Vetch Field	3–2	Ellis (2)	Todd, McLaughlin, Pound	17,875
10 March 1965	Welsh Cup SF	Somerton Park, Newport	1–0	Farrell		7,500
6 April 1965	Division 2	Ninian Park	5–0	Allchurch (3), Charles (2)		15,896
4 January 1966	Welsh Cup R5	Vetch Field	2–2	Andrews, King	Murray (o.g.), Allchurch	10,275
8 February 1966	Welsh Cup R5 (replay)	Ninian Park	5–3 (a.e.t.)	G. Williams, Johnston (2)	Todd (2), H. Williams, McLaughlin, Evans	9,836
17 January 1967	Welsh Cup R5	Vetch Field	4–0	Lewis, Farrell, Johnston (2)		11,816
22 April 1969	Welsh Cup F (first leg)	Vetch Field	3–1	Toshack (2), Nurse (o.g.)	Williams	10,207
29 April 1969	Welsh Cup F (second leg)	Ninian Park	2–0	Toshack, Lea		12,617
11 March 1970	Welsh Cup SF	Ninian Park	2–2	Woodruff, Toshack	Evans, Williams	18,050
2 May 1970	Welsh Cup SF (replay)	Vetch Field	2–0 (a.e.t.)	Bird, King		20,400
3 January 1972	Welsh Cup R5	Vetch Field	2–0	Warboys, Clark		14,319
17 February 1976	Welsh Cup R6	Ninian Park	1–1	Bruton (o.g.)	Bruton	5,812
3 March 1976	Welsh Cup R6 (replay)	Vetch Field	3–0	Clark, Alston (2)		10,075
1 January 1980	Division 2	Vetch Field	2–1	Lewis	Toshack, Giles	21,306
7 April 1980	Division 2	Ninian Park	1–0	Ronson		14,634
27 December 1980	Division 2	Ninian Park	3–3	Stevens, Kitchen, Buchanan	Robinson, Curtis, James	21,198
19 April 1981	Division 2	Vetch Field	1–1	Kitchen	James	19,038
12 May 1982	Welsh Cup F (first leg)	Ninian Park	0–0			11,960
19 May 1982	Welsh Cup F (second leg)	Vetch Field	2–1	Bennett	Latchford (2)	15,858
26 December 1983	Division 2	Ninian Park	3–2	Gibbins, Vaughan, Lee	Stanley (pen.), Toshack	14,580
21 April 1984	Division 2	Vetch Field	3–2	Smith, Owen	Saunders (2), Walsh	10,275
20 August 1985	League Cup R1 (first leg)	Ninian Park	2–1	Flynn (2)	Marustik	4,218
3 September 1985	League Cup R1 (second leg)	Vetch Field	3–1	Farrington	Randell (2), Pascoe	4,621
26 December 1985	Division 3	Ninian Park	1–0	Vaughan		8,375
28 January 1986	Associate Members' Cup R1	Ninian Park	2–0		McCarthy (2)	1,006
31 March 1986	Division 3	Vetch Field	2–0		Hough, Williams	6,643
26 December 1986	Division 4	Ninian Park	0–0			11,450
20 April 1987	Division 4	Vetch Field	2–0		Atkinson, Boyle (own goal)	6,653
29 August 1987	Division 4	Ninian Park	1–0	Gilligan		5,790
1 January 1988	Division 4	Vetch Field	2–2	Ford, Gilligan	Allon, Raynor	9,560
30 August 1988	League Cup R1 (first leg)	Ninian Park	1–0		Thornber	6,241
20 September 1988	League Cup R1 (second leg)	Vetch Field	2–0	Wheeler, Boyle		6,987
6 December 1988	Associate Members' Cup R1	Ninian Park	2–0	Curtis, Gilligan		2,986
26 December 1988	Division 3	Ninian Park	2–2	Gilligan (2)	Puckett, Davies	10,675
27 March 1989	Division 3	Vetch Field	1–1	Gilligan	Raynor	9,201
26 December 1989	Division 3	Vetch Field	1–0	Barnard		12,244
16 April 1990	Division 3	Ninian Park	2–0		Hughes, Wade	8,356
16 November 1991	FA Cup R1	Vetch Field	2–1	Blake	Gilligan, Harris	13,516
19 November 1991	Associate Members' Cup R1	Vetch Field	0–0			2,955
18 February 1992	Welsh Cup R5	Vetch Field	1–0	Pike		7,303
19 January 1993	Associate Members' Cup R1	Ninian Park	2–1	Blake	Legg, Hayes	13,516
22 December 1993	Second Division	Ninian Park	1–0	Thompson		9,815
2 April 1994	Second Division	Vetch Field	1–0		Penney	3,711
14 April 1994	Welsh Cup SF (first leg)	Vetch Field	2–1	Stant (2)	Cornforth	3,286
28 April 1994	Welsh Cup SF (second leg)	Ninian Park	4–1	Fereday, Bird, Stant, Millar (pen.)	McFarlane	5,606
3 September 1994	Second Division	Ninian Park	1–1	Richardson	Hayes	9,815
2 March 1995	Second Division	Vetch Field	4–1	Wigg	Williams, Penney, Pascoe, Chapple	5,523
11 April 1995	Welsh Cup SF (first leg)	Vetch Field	1–0	Millar		2,654
2 May 1995	Welsh Cup SF (second leg)	Ninian Park	0–0			4,227
3 December 1996	Third Division	Ninian Park	3–1	White	Ampadu, Jones, Thomas	3,721
2 March 1997	Third Division	Vetch Field	1–0	Haworth		4,430
2 November 1997	Third Division	Ninian Park	1–0		Walker	6,459
8 March 1998	Third Division	Vetch Field	1–1	Fowler	Coates	5,621
22 November 1998	Third Division	Vetch Field	2–1	Williams	Thomas, Bound	7,757
2 March 1999	FAW Premier Cup QF	Ninian Park	3–2	Thomas, Eckhardt, Williams	Alsop, Casey	2,333
18 April 1999	Third Division	Ninian Park	0–0			10,809
13 May 2002	FAW Premier Cup F	Ninian Park	1–0	Kavanagh		6,629
23 September 2008	League Cup R3	Liberty Stadium	1–0		Gómez	17,411
30 November 2008	Championship	Liberty Stadium	2–2	Ledley, McCormack	Pratley, Pintado	18,053
5 April 2009	Championship	Ninian Park	2–2	Chopra, McCormack	Dyer, Allen	20,156
7 November 2009	Championship	Liberty Stadium	3–2	Bothroyd, Hudson	Dyer, Pratley (2)	18,209
3 April 2010	Championship	Cardiff City Stadium	2–1	Chopra (2)	Orlandi	25,130
7 November 2010	Championship	Cardiff City Stadium	1–0		Emnes	26,049
6 February 2011	Championship	Liberty Stadium	1–0	Bellamy		18,280
3 November 2013	Premier League	Cardiff City Stadium	1–0	Caulker		27,463
8 February 2014	Premier League	Liberty Stadium	3–0		Routledge, Dyer, Bony	20,402
27 October 2019	Championship	Liberty Stadium	1–0		Wilmot	20,270
12 January 2020	Championship	Cardiff City Stadium	0–0			28,529
12 December 2020	Championship	Cardiff City Stadium	2–0		Lowe (2)	0 (Note: No fans were allowed to attend the match due to the COVID-19 pandemic.)
20 March 2021	Championship	Liberty Stadium	1–0	Flint		0 (Note: No fans were allowed to attend the match due to the COVID-19 pandemic.)
17 October 2021	Championship	Swansea.com Stadium	3–0		Paterson, Piroe, Bidwell	19,288
2 April 2022	Championship	Cardiff City Stadium	4–0		Obafemi (2), Cabango, Wolf	27,280
22 October 2022	Championship	Swansea.com Stadium	2–0		Cooper, Obafemi	19,814
1 April 2023	Championship	Cardiff City Stadium	3–2	Philogene, Kaba	Piroe, Cullen, Cabango	28,232
16 September 2023	Championship	Cardiff City Stadium	2–0	Tanner, Ramsey (pen)		28,648
16 March 2024	Championship	Swansea.com Stadium	2–0		Cullen, Lowe	20,005
25 August 2024	Championship	Swansea.com Stadium	1–1	Robinson	Cullen	20,174
18 January 2025	Championship	Cardiff City Stadium	3–0	Robinson (2), Goutas		26,536

== Player records ==
=== Appearances ===
Swansea goalkeeper Roger Freestone has appeared in more competitive South Wales derbies than any other player. He made his first derby appearance while on loan to the club from Chelsea in December 1989. He signed for Swansea on a permanent basis in 1991 and went on to feature in 19 derbies. His final derby appearance was a 1–0 defeat during the 2002 FAW Premier Cup final. Three players are tied for the second most derby appearances; Alan Harrington and Herbie Williams both made 17 appearances for one club, Cardiff and Swansea respectively, while Ivor Allchurch played in derbies during spells with both sides. Allchurch and Freestone both made a record 11 derby league appearances, tied with Ron Stitfall.

Ranking	Player	Derby appearances (Note: Excludes friendly and wartime fixtures.)	Club
1	Roger Freestone	19	Swansea City
2=	Ivor Allchurch	17	Swansea Town & Cardiff City
2=	Alan Harrington	17	Cardiff City
2=	Herbie Williams	17	Swansea Town
5	Ron Stitfall	16	Cardiff City

=== Goals ===
Brayley Reynolds has scored more goals in competitive South Wales derbies than any other player. He began his career with Cardiff in 1956 but joined Swansea in 1959 and scored his first derby goal the following year in a Welsh Cup match. He went on to score in his next three derbies, including two braces. His final goals in a derby match was a third brace during a 3–0 victory for Swansea at Vetch Field in March 1964, ending his career with eight goals against Cardiff. Ronnie Williams tallied one less during his career, scoring seven times for Swansea, while Jimmy Gilligan scored six times in spells with both Swansea and Cardiff. George Johnston is the highest scoring Cardiff player, he scored four times all of which came in the Welsh Cup. Gilligan scored more league goals in the fixture than any other player with five of his goals being scored in the Football League.

Ranking	Player	Derby goals	Club
1	Brayley Reynolds	8	Swansea Town
2	Ronnie Williams	7	Swansea Town
3=	Jimmy Gilligan	6	Cardiff City & Swansea Town
3=	Herbie Williams	6	Swansea Town
5=	George Johnston	4	Cardiff City
5=	John Toshack	4	Cardiff City & Swansea City

=== Players for both clubs ===
Transfers between the two sides are relatively rare, the last player to move directly across the South Wales derby divide was Warren Feeney who was loaned to Swansea from Cardiff for a brief spell in 2007. The last player to complete a permanent transfer between the sides was Dave Penney who moved from Swansea to Cardiff in 1997.

In the 1950s and 1960s, the two sides saw several players feature for both sides during their careers, including some of the most noted Welsh players of the era, such as Trevor Ford, Ivor Allchurch and Mel Charles. However, as the animosity between the two clubs has worsened, players have sometimes received a hostile reception when playing for both sides of the divide. Dave Penney captained Swansea during the 1997 Football League Third Division play-off final and made over 100 appearances for the club before joining Cardiff. Despite this, ahead of his first return to Vetch Field in 2004, he stated that he "expected stick" on his return, adding "Moving from one Welsh club to the other is regarded as the ultimate sin down there." Andy Legg joined Cardiff in 1998 having played for Swansea earlier in his career and initially received a hostile reception Cardiff fans. When he attempted to celebrate his first goal for the club in front of home fans, he was met with abuse and even received a razor blade in the post. He later stated, "I'd say the hatred between (Cardiff and Swansea) fans [...] was the most intense I have come across." The rivalry is prevalent among the club's staff as well as fans; David Giles has described how he was warned away from speaking to former friends at Swansea when arriving at Vetch Field as a Cardiff player.

== Newport rivalry ==
Newport County are also a South Wales rival, regarding both Cardiff City and Swansea City as rivals, but particularly Cardiff for reasons of proximity and historic rivalry between the two cities. The clubs' relative league positions meant that Newport have rarely played Cardiff or Swansea since 1989, though they have faced each other in cup competitions. A survey by Football Fans Census in 2003 saw Swansea, Bristol City and Newport listed as Cardiff's main three rivalries, with Stoke City matching Newport in third. Swansea meanwhile regarded Cardiff, Bristol City and Bristol Rovers as their main rivals.
