= Peter Denton =

Peter Denton may refer to:

- Peter Denton (footballer) (1946–2016), British footballer
- Peter Denton (musician), former member of the English indie rock band The Kooks
- Peter Denton (pole vaulter) (1926–2000), Australian pole vaulter
