= Canario =

Canario, El Canario or Los Canarios may refer to:

== People ==
- Canário, Brazilian former footballer Darcy Silveira dos Santos (born 1934)
- Alexander Canario (born 2000), Dominican baseball player
- Carlos Canário (1918–1990), Portuguese footballer
- Carlos Canário (footballer, born 1944), Portuguese former footballer, son of the above
- César Canario (born 1987), Argentinian footballer
- Dennis Canario (born 1960), American politician
- Maycon Canário (born 1994), Brazilian footballer
- José Alberto "El Canario", stage name of Dominican salsa singer José Alberto Justiniano (born 1958)
- Nicolás Biglianti (1974–2026), Uruguayan football goalkeeper known as "El Canario"
- Canary Islanders (Spanish: canarios), the people of the Canary Islands

== Other uses ==
- El Canario (Primero de Enero), Cuba, a village
- español canario and dialecto canario, Spanish terms for the Canarian Spanish language variant
- Canary dance, a Renaissance dance called Canario in Italian
- Los Canarios, a Spanish pop rock active from 1964 to 1974
- Museo Canario, an archaeological museum in the Canary Islands

== See also ==
- Beto y sus Canarios, a Mexican band
