= Trevor Peck =

Welsh footballer

Personal information
- Full name: Dennis Trevor Peck
- Date of birth: 25 May 1938
- Place of birth: Llanelli, Wales
- Date of death: 14 May 2014 (aged 75)
- Place of death: Kettering, England
- Position: Defender

Senior career*
Years	Team	Apps	(Gls)
1958–1965	Cardiff City	42	(0)
1965–1968	Worcester City		
1968–1974	Kettering Town		
- * Club domestic league appearances and goals

Dennis Trevor Peck (25 May 1938 — 14 May 2014) was a Welsh professional footballer. After playing for Llanelli, he joined Cardiff City in February 1958 where he made his professional debut. He spent six seasons with the club, largely as a reserve, before moving into non-league football with Worcester City and Kettering Town.

== Early life ==
Born in Llanelli on 25 May 1938, Peck was one of ten children.

== Club career ==
He began his career with his hometown club Llanelli before joining Football League Second Division side Cardiff City in February 1958, where his wages were around £15 a week and he considered himself "a pretty wealthy chap." However, soon after signing for the club, he was called up to complete his national service which led to his debut for the club coming two years later, playing in a 2–1 victory over Swansea Town in the Welsh Cup on 25 February 1960. He made his league debut two months later, in a 1–0 victory over Stoke City in place of Danny Malloy.

However, in the following three seasons Peck remained in the club's reserve side, making only one appearance for Cardiff in a 2–0 victory over French side Lens in the Anglo-Franco-Scottish Friendship Cup. He eventually broke into the first team but was used largely as cover, his most prominent season coming in 1964–65 when he made 23 appearances in all competitions. However, he was released by the club in 1965 and joined Worcester City. In October 1968, he joined Kettering Town where he went on to make over 250 appearances and was named the club's Player of the Year in 1972 before leaving in May 1974.

== Career statistics ==
Club	Season	League			FA Cup		League Cup		Other (Note: Includes appearances in the Welsh Cup, UEFA Cup Winners' Cup and the Anglo-Franco-Scottish Friendship Cup.)		Total	
Club	Season	Division	Apps	Goals	Apps	Goals	Apps	Goals	Apps	Goals	Apps	Goals
Cardiff City	1959–60	Second Division	1	0	0	0	— (Note: The Football League Cup was started held for the first time in the 1960–61 season.)		1	0	2	0
Cardiff City	1960–61	First Division	0	0	0	0	0	0	0	0	0	0
Cardiff City	1961–62	First Division	0	0	0	0	0	0	1	0	1	0
Cardiff City	1962–63	Second Division	8	0	0	0	0	0	0	0	8	0
Cardiff City	1963–64	Second Division	15	0	0	0	0	0	4	0	19	0
Cardiff City	1964–65	Second Division	18	0	0	0	1	0	4	0	23	0
Total			42	0	0	0	1	0	10	0	53	0
