= Terry Harkin =

Northern Irish footballer (born 1941)

Personal information
- Full name: John Terence Harkin
- Date of birth: 14 September 1941 (age 85)
- Place of birth: Derry, Northern Ireland
- Height: 6 ft 0 in (1.83 m)
- Position: Forward

Youth career
- Derry City

Senior career*
Years	Team	Apps	(Gls)
	Coleraine	?	(?)
1962–1964	Port Vale	27	(11)
1964–1965	Crewe Alexandra	42	(34)
1965–1966	Cardiff City	20	(10)
1966–1967	Notts County	28	(10)
1967–1968	Southport	64	(31)
1968–1971	Shrewsbury Town	79	(29)
1971–1979	Finn Harps	139	(66)
1973	→ Toronto Metros (loan)	11	(5)
1979–1980	Dundalk	3	(0)
Total		413+	(196+)

International career
- Northern Ireland U23
1968–1970	Northern Ireland	5	(2)
- * Club domestic league appearances and goals

John Terence Harkin (born 14 September 1941) is a Northern Irish former professional footballer who played as a forward. He scored 125 goals in 260 league games in nine seasons in the Football League. He also scored 66 goals in 142 games in the League of Ireland and scored five goals in 11 North American Soccer League games. At the international level, he made five appearances, scoring two goals for the Northern Ireland national team.

He began his career with Derry City and Coleraine, before winning a £2,000 move to Port Vale in September 1962. He was sold to Crewe Alexandra for £3,000 in June 1964 and scored a club record 35 goals in 1964–65. He moved on to Cardiff City in August 1965 before switching to Notts County the following year. He was sold to Southport for £2,000 the next year before being transferred to Shrewsbury Town in March 1969. He returned to Ireland in 1971 to play for Finn Harps. He spent eight years with the club and won the FAI Cup in 1974, and helped the Harps to finish second in the League of Ireland in 1972–73, 1975–76, and 1977–78. In summer 1973, he played on loan for Canadian club Toronto Metros. He ended his career in 1980, following a brief spell at Dundalk.

== Club career ==
A prolific goalscorer throughout his career, Harkin started as a youth with Derry City before making his name with Bertie Peacock's Coleraine. He transferred to Norman Low's Port Vale for a £2,000 fee in September 1962. He opened his account for the Valiants with a brace in a 5–1 win over Southend United at Vale Park on 24 September. He finished the 1962–63 season with 10 goals in 17 Third Division, as new boss Freddie Steele took the club to within one place of automatic promotion. In 1963–64, Harkin managed only two goals in eleven games, both against Southend.

A close-season £3,000 transfer to Jimmy McGuigan's Crewe Alexandra in June 1964 brought an improvement to Harkin's league opportunities. He scored 35 times (a seasonal record for a Crewe player) in the Fourth Division in 1964–65, including a four-goal performance in a 6–2 win over Barrow. This form brought the attention of higher-league clubs, and new Port Vale manager Jackie Mudie tried to re-sign Harkin towards the end of the season, but he remained at Gresty Road.

In August 1965, Cardiff City manager Jimmy Scoular took Harkin into the Second Division. An explosive start to his Ninian Park career saw a debut goal in a 2–1 defeat by Derby County and a total of seven in his first eight games before his form dipped and goals dried up. The Bluebirds narrowly avoided relegation in 1965–66. Thereafter, Harkin's first-team opportunities were sporadic, and in September 1966, both club and player decided to part ways.

A "no-nonsense" striker, strong in the air and possessing a powerful shot with either foot, Harkin found himself back in the Fourth Division with Notts County. An explosive start at Meadow Lane brought Harkin seven goals by mid-November before his form slightly dipped. At the end of 1966–67, the Magpies finished just above the re-election positions and accepted a £2,000 bid for Harkin from Southport, newly promoted to the Third Division.

At that time, Southport were managed by Billy Bingham, and although he left mid-season to manage Plymouth Argyle, he clearly remembered Harkin for the other post he had also taken that season, part-time manager of Northern Ireland. His 21 league goals in 1967–68 helped the Sandgrounders to mid-table respectability and an appearance in the FA Cup third round, where they lost narrowly, 1–0, to First Division giants, Everton.

In March 1969, cash-strapped Southport manager Don McEvoy was forced to sell one of his prize assets as Harkin joined struggling Third Division rivals, Shrewsbury Town. Harkin's eight goals in 17 appearances helped drag the Shrews to safety in 1968–69. Harkin remained a regular goalscorer at Gay Meadow in 1969–70 through to the end of the 1970–71 season, when he moved back home to sign for County Donegal club, Finn Harps.

Harkin helped the Harps to the most successful period in their history when he tied (with Waterford's Alfie Hale) in the League of Ireland in 1972–73 on a league-leading tally of 20 goals. He claimed an FAI Cup winners' medal the following year (the club's only ever major trophy win). The Harps did regularly challenge for the League championship and finished as runners-up in 1972–73, 1975–76 and 1977–78. They also competed in Europe regularly, and Harkin scored in two legs against Aberdeen in the 1973–74 UEFA Cup. Harkin's 82 league and cup goals leaves him in the club's top-five all-time goalscorers.

Harkin spent the summer of 1973 playing in the North American Soccer League, helping the Toronto Metros to the play-offs with nine goals and five assists (15 points in MVP terms) in eleven games. He finished his senior career as a 38-year-old with Dundalk, later becoming a director at Derry City.

== International career ==
It was during his debut season in England that Harkin won his first senior representative honour, leading the line for the Northern Ireland under-23's in a 5–1 defeat by Wales at Vetch Field, Swansea, in February 1963.

His first full cap for Northern Ireland came in 1968. On 11 December 1968, they faced Turkey at BJK İnönü Stadium in Istanbul in qualification for the 1970 FIFA World Cup, and Harkin bagged a brace in a 3–0 win. The final two caps of Harkin's international career were won in Moscow and Seville, both games resulting in defeats.

== Career statistics ==
=== Club ===
Appearances and goals by club, season and competition
Club	Season	League			FA Cup		Other		Total	
Club	Season	Division	Apps	Goals	Apps	Goals	Apps	Goals	Apps	Goals
Port Vale	1962–63	Third Division	17	10	0	0	0	0	17	10
Port Vale	1963–64	Third Division	10	1	0	0	1	1	11	2
Port Vale	Total		27	11	0	0	1	1	28	12
Crewe Alexandra	1964–65	Fourth Division	42	34	1	0	1	0	44	34
Cardiff City	1965–66	Second Division	20	10	2	0	7	3	29	13
Cardiff City	1966–67	Second Division	0	0	0	0	2	0	2	0
Cardiff City	Total		20	10	2	0	9	3	31	13
Notts County	1966–67	Fourth Division	28	10	1	0	0	0	29	10
Southport	1967–68	Third Division	41	21	2	1	1	0	44	22
Southport	1968–69	Third Division	23	10	2	0	3	0	28	10
Southport	Total		64	31	4	1	4	0	72	32
Shrewsbury Town	1968–69	Third Division	17	8	0	0	0	0	17	8
Shrewsbury Town	1969–70	Third Division	41	15	2	0	0	0	43	15
Shrewsbury Town	1970–71	Third Division	21	6	2	0	1	0	24	6
Shrewsbury Town	Total		79	29	4	0	1	0	84	29
Finn Harps	1971–72	League of Ireland	26	17						
Finn Harps	1972–73	League of Ireland	26	20						
Finn Harps	1973–74	League of Ireland	25	6						
Finn Harps	1974–75	League of Ireland								
Finn Harps	1975–76	League of Ireland	24	9						
Finn Harps	1976–77	League of Ireland	21	8						
Finn Harps	1977–78	League of Ireland	16	6						
Finn Harps	1980–81	League of Ireland	1	0						
Toronto Metros (loan)	1973	NASL	11	5	—		—		11	5

=== International ===
Appearances and goals by national team and year
National team	Year	Apps	Goals
Northern Ireland	1968	2	2
Northern Ireland	1969	2	0
Northern Ireland	1970	1	0
Total		5	2

== Honours ==
Finn Harps

- FAI Cup: 1974
