= Warren Hunt (footballer) =

English footballer (born 1984)

Personal information
- Full name: Warren David Hunt
- Date of birth: 2 March 1984 (age 42)
- Place of birth: Portsmouth, England
- Position: Forward

Senior career*
Years	Team	Apps	(Gls)
2003–2004	Portsmouth	0	(0)
2004	→ Leyton Orient (loan)	6	(0)
2004–2007	Fareham Town	?	(?)
2007–2008	Chichester City United	?	(?)
2008–	Sholing		
- * Club domestic league appearances and goals

Warren David Hunt (born 2 March 1984) is an English former professional footballer who played as a striker.

Hunt was born in Portsmouth. He was originally signed with Portsmouth, but never made an appearance. Warren played for Leyton Orient in the Football League.
