= David West (footballer) =

English footballer

Personal information
- Full name: David Christopher West
- Date of birth: 16 November 1964 (age 61)
- Place of birth: Dorchester, England
- Position: Striker

Senior career*
Years	Team	Apps	(Gls)
19??–1983	Dorchester Town		
1983–1985	Liverpool	0	(0)
1985–1986	Torquay United	21	(2)
- Cheltenham Town
- Dorchester Town
- Bashley
- Fareham Town
- * Club domestic league appearances and goals

David Christopher West (born 16 November 1964 in Dorchester) is an English former professional footballer.

West played for Westwey Dynamoes before joining Weymouth as a junior. He progressed to the youth set-up at Bournemouth before joining the youth system at Dorchester Town. He played for Dorchester YMCA and the England Under-18 team before graduating into Dorchester Town's first team.

He was signed by Bob Paisley for Liverpool in 1983 for a fee of £15,000. He played on a pre-season tour of the Netherlands, but had to settle for reserve team football in the Central League, although he did twice make the bench in the European Cup. Disillusioned with reserve team football he asked new Liverpool manager Joe Fagan if he could go out on loan. Fagan's response was to release him.

He had a trial with Bristol City before joining Torquay United in September 1985, making his debut on 14 September in a 3–0 Fourth Division defeat at home to Chester City. He played 21 times in Torquay's struggling side before being released after Torquay had finished bottom of the league at the end of the season. He had a trial with a Belgian league side and was offered a contract, but chose to drop into non-league football with Cheltenham Town.

In December 1986, while driving home to Weymouth from Cheltenham, he was involved in a head-on collision with a milk tanker and suffered a number of injuries. On resuming his football career, he played for Dorchester Town, Bashley and Fareham Town before retiring at the age of just 27 years to concentrate on his new career as an estate agent. West is currently in employment with the estate agent chain Symonds And Sampson and works in the Poundbury branch.
