= Gordon Harris (footballer, born 1945) =

Scottish footballer

Personal information
- Full name: Gordon William Harris
- Date of birth: 19 February 1945 (age 81)
- Place of birth: Campmuir, Scotland
- Position: Full back

Youth career
- Luncarty

Senior career*
Years	Team	Apps	(Gls)
1964–1965	Forfar Athletic	17	(0)
1965	Cardiff City	5	(0)
- * Club domestic league appearances and goals

Gordon William Harris (born 19 February 1945) is a Scottish former professional footballer who played as a full back.

== Career ==
After playing junior football for Luncarty, Harris began his senior career with Forfar Athletic. His performances attracted attention from several Football League sides and, in March 1965, Cardiff City manager Jimmy Scoular paid £2,000 to sign him. He played five league matches but was released by the club at the end of the season, giving up professional football to become a trainee architect.
