= Bob Wilson (footballer, born 1943) =

English footballer (1943–2020)

Personal information
- Full name: Robert John Wilson
- Date of birth: 23 May 1943
- Place of birth: Birmingham, England
- Date of death: 3 October 2020 (aged 77)
- Place of death: Exeter, Devon, England
- Position: Goalkeeper

Youth career
- 1958–1961: Aston Villa

Senior career*
Years	Team	Apps	(Gls)
1961–1964	Aston Villa	9	(0)
1964–1970	Cardiff City	115	(0)
1969	→ Bristol City (loan)	1	(0)
1970–1976	Exeter City	205	(0)
- * Club domestic league appearances and goals

Robert John Wilson (23 May 1943 – 3 October 2020) was an English professional footballer.

== Career ==
Born in Birmingham, Wilson began his career with Aston Villa as a youth player. He went on to make nine league appearances for the club before he was sold to Cardiff City in August 1964 as manager Jimmy Scoular's first signing for a fee of £2,000. In his first season at the club he helped the side win the Welsh Cup and reach the quarter-finals of the European Cup Winners Cup, where they were knocked out by Real Zaragoza. The following season the club reached the semi-finals of the League Cup against West Ham United. Wilson was dropped after conceding five goals in the first leg, only for his replacement to also concede five in the second leg. It was during this season that Wilson helped the club reach the semi-final of the Cup Winners Cup; the furthest Cardiff have ever been in a European competition, where they were defeated by Hamburg. Despite constant pressure from Dilwyn John and Lyn Davies he managed to hold on to the number one spot for the majority of his stay at the club.

He left Cardiff in January 1970, after a short loan spell at Bristol City, for Exeter City where he was the club's first choice goalkeeper for several years before retiring in 1976.

Wilson died on 3 October 2020 in Exeter, aged 77.

== Honours ==
Cardiff City

- Welsh Cup Winner: 2

1965, 1967
