= Mal Lucas =

Welsh footballer (1938–2024)

Personal information
- Full name: Peter Malcolm Lucas
- Date of birth: 7 October 1938
- Place of birth: Wrexham, Wales
- Date of death: 14 March 2024 (aged 85)
- Height: 5 ft 6 1/2 in (1.69 m)
- Position: Right-half

Senior career*
Years	Team	Apps	(Gls)
- Bradley Rangers
1958–1965	Leyton Orient	157	(6)
1965–1970	Norwich City	183	(8)
1970–1974	Torquay United	122	(3)
- Gorleston

International career
1962	Wales	4	(0)

Managerial career
- 1976–1980: Gorleston
- * Club domestic league appearances and goals

Peter Malcolm Lucas (7 October 1938 – 14 March 2024) was a Welsh footballer who played as a right-half. He made four appearances for the Wales national team.

== Club career ==
After beginning his career at non-League Bradley Rangers, Lucas signed for Leyton Orient in 1958 and was part of the team that played in the First Division in 1962–63. In 1964 he joined Norwich City, where he played 183 league games before joining Torquay United in 1970, where he made 122 appearances.

== International career ==
Lucas made his Wales national team debut on 11 April 1962 against Northern Ireland. His fourth and last cap was on 21 November 1962 against England.

== Coaching career ==
After leaving Torquay, he became player-manager at Gorleston, managing them from 1976 until 1980.

== Death ==
Lucas died on 14 March 2024, at the age of 85.
