= Richie Reynolds =

English footballer (born 1948)

Richard Reynolds
Personal information
- Date of birth: 15 February 1948 (age 78)
- Place of birth: Looe, Cornwall, England
- Positions: Striker; midfielder

Youth career
- 1963–65: Plymouth Argyle

Senior career*
Years	Team	Apps	(Gls)
1965–1971	Plymouth Argyle	131	(24)
1970–1971	→ Yeovil Town (loan)		(4)
1971–1976	Portsmouth	140	(24)
1976–1977	Haarlem	5	(0)

International career
1966	England Youth	3	(1)

Managerial career
- Chichester City
- Petersfield
- Fareham Town
- Wick
- 2002: Newport (IOW)
- * Club domestic league appearances and goals

Richard Reynolds (born 15 February 1948) is an English former professional footballer who played as a striker or midfielder in a career which ran from the mid-1960s to the mid-1970s.

== Career ==
Born in Looe, Reynolds started his career as an apprentice at Plymouth Argyle. He made his debut in an FA Cup tie against Derby County on 9 January 1965, aged 16, and signed professional forms a month later. In all Reynolds was to make over 100 appearances for The Pilgrims.

He had a loan spell at Yeovil, winning the Southern League in 1970–71. before moving to Portsmouth in the 1971 close season. He was to prove such a popular player that in 1972 he was awarded the title of Pompey's Player of the Year. Other strikers came and went.

Reynolds left Portsmouth after a Football League Tribunal in which Reynolds was awarded a substantial amount of compensation for wages he later described as "disgusting". The tribunal also instructed Portsmouth to release Reynolds from his contract as they couldn't pay him. He never received the payment owed to him.

Reynolds left Portsmouth in February 1976 to sign for the Eredivisie side Haarlem. His career was cut short by a serious knee injury sustained playing against Ajax Amsterdam.
