= Pat Murphy (Welsh footballer) =

Welsh footballer

Personal information
- Full name: Patrick Murphy
- Date of birth: 19 December 1947 (age 78)
- Place of birth: Merthyr Tydfil, Wales
- Position: Right half

Senior career*
Years	Team	Apps	(Gls)
1965–1966	Cardiff City	1	(0)
1971–1972	Merthyr Tydfil	?	(?)
- * Club domestic league appearances and goals

Patrick Murphy (born 19 December 1947) is a Welsh former professional footballer who played in the Football League as a right half.
