= Fareham Town F.C. =

Association football club in England

Coordinates: 50°50′44″N 1°11′25″W

Fareham Town
- Full name: Fareham Town Football Club
- Nickname: The Creeksiders
- Founded: 1947
- Ground: Cams Alders Stadium, Fareham
- Capacity: 4,500 (450 seated & 500 covered)
- Chairman: Daryn Brewer
- Manager: Simon Woods
- League: Wessex League Premier Division
- 2025–26: Isthmian League South Central Division, 22nd of 22 (relegated)
Home colours	Away colours

Fareham Town F.C. is a football club based in Fareham, Hampshire, England. The club is affiliated to the Hampshire Football Association, and is an England Accredited club. They currently play in the Isthmian League South Central Division after defeating Andover New Street 2–1 in the Wessex League play offs final on 26 April 2025.

== History ==
Fareham Town were formed in 1947, when three local sides Fareham FC, Fareham Brotherhood FC and Fareham Youth Centre FC amalgamated together after at a public meeting in the town in 1946, it was suggested to form a football club for the town. The club joined the Portsmouth League and started playing their games at Beaconsfield Meadow, before moving to Bath Lane.

At the end of the 1948–49 season the club gained promotion to Division 3 (East) of the Hampshire League, and gained promotion to Division Two as champions at the first attempt. The club made further progress in the 1952–53 season when they finished as Runners-up in Division Two to gain promotion to Division One. Three seasons later the club then made its debut in the FA Cup, making it to the fourth qualifying round before being knocked out by Wycombe Wanderers. The club in the 1959–60 competition won Division One for the first time. Further success would follow when the club won Division One, five consecutive season's times from the 1962–63 campaign. The club would go on to win the league twice more during the 1970s. In 1975 the club then moved to its present home of the Cams Alders ground.

With the club finishing runners up in the 1978–79 campaign the club successfully joined the Southern Football League, starting in the Southern Division. In the 1982–83 season the club was placed in the Premier Division of the league, when the league was re-structured. The club would then spend the next seven seasons in the Premier Division, during which time, they managed to get to the Semi-finals of the FA Trophy before losing to the eventual winners Kidderminster Harriers. At the end of the 1988–89 campaign the club finished 19th and were relegated to the Southern Division, where they would then spend the next nine seasons. During this time the club would win the Hampshire Senior Cup for the fourth time, when they beat Farnborough Town 4–1 in the final.

At the end of the 1997–98 season the club, decided to move down to the Wessex League, due to the finances involved in staying in the Southern League. Since then the club remained in the top division of the Wessex League until the 2024–2025 season when they were promoted to the Isthmian League South Central Division after defeating Andover New Street 2–1 in the Wessex League play offs final on 26 April 2025.

== Stadium ==
Fareham Town play their home games at Cams Alders Football Stadium, Cams Alders, Palmerston Drive, Fareham, Hampshire, PO14 1BJ.

Cams Alders has a covered stand seating 450 people, whilst the rest of the ground is reserved for standing. The ground has floodlights, allowing evening games to be played.

== Honours ==
=== League honours ===
- Hampshire League Division One
  - Winners (8): 1959–60, 1962–63, 1963–64, 1964–65, 1965–66, 1966–67, 1972–73, 1974–75
  - Runners-up (6): 1955–56, 1960–61, 1967–68, 1971–72, 1976–77, 1978–79
- Hampshire League Division Two
  - Runners-up (1): 1952–53
- Hampshire League Division Three (East)
  - Winners (1): 1949–50

=== Cup honours ===
- Hampshire Senior Cup:
  - Winners (4): 1956–57, 1962–63, 1967–68, 1992–93
  - Runners-up (3): 1959–60, 1997–98, 2003–04

== Records ==
- Highest League Position: 8th in Southern League Premier Division 1982–83
- FA Cup best performance: First round 1979–80, 1985–86, 1986–87, 1988–89
- FA Amateur Cup best performance: Second round 1973–74
- FA Trophy best performance: Semi-final 1986–87
- FA Vase best performance: Fourth round 2024–25

== Staff ==
Name	Role
Manager	(England) Simon Woods
Assistants	(England) Paul Barton, Cal Britton, Stu Long

== Former players ==
1. Players that have played/managed in the football league or any foreign equivalent to this level (i.e. fully professional league).
2. Players with full international caps.
- (England) Kevin Bartlett
- (England) Neal Bartlett
- (England) Robbie Carroll
- (England) Mark Chamberlain
- (England) Steve Claridge
- (England) Kevin Dillon
- (England) Darren Foreman
- (England) John Hold
- (England) Warren Hunt
- (Scotland) Ross Irwin
- (England) Ian Juryeff
- (England) Dave Leworthy
- (England) Thomas McGhee
- (England) John McLaughlin
- (England) Paul Moody
- (England) Richie Moran
- (England) Ken Todd
- (England) Eric Webber
- (England) David West
- (England) John Smeulders

== Former coaches ==
1. Managers/Coaches that have played/managed in the football league or any foreign equivalent to this level (i.e. fully professional league).
2. Managers/Coaches with full international caps.
- (England) Mark Chamberlain
- (England) Ray Crawford
- (England) Jon Gittens
- (England) Joe Laidlaw
- (England) Richie Reynolds
