= David Houston (footballer) =

Scottish footballer & manager (born 1948)

Personal information
- Full name: David Houston
- Date of birth: 7 July 1948 (age 78)
- Place of birth: Glasgow, Scotland
- Height: 6 ft 0 in (1.83 m)
- Position: Wing half

Youth career
- 1963–1965: Cardiff City

Senior career*
Years	Team	Apps	(Gls)
1965–1967	Cardiff City	18	(0)
1967–1968	Crystal Palace	0	(0)
1968–1974	Margate		
1974	Dover		
1975–1979	Pontardawe Athletic		
1979–1986	BP Llandarcy		

Managerial career
- 1978–1979: Pontardawe Athletic
- 1985: BP Llandarcy
- * Club domestic league appearances and goals

David Houston (born 7 July 1948) is a Scottish former professional footballer and manager. Born in Glasgow, he began his career with Welsh side Cardiff City where he signed at the age of fifteen. He made his professional debut two years later and went on to make more than 20 appearances for the club before being allowed to join Crystal Palace in 1967. However, he never played a first team game for Palace and departed the club a year later.

He moved into non-league football with Margate. In seven years at the club, he made 395 appearances in all competitions and was named their player of the year for the 1972–73 season. He left Margate in 1974 and, after a brief spell with Dover, he returned to Wales where he joined Pontardawe Athletic. He succeeded Ivor Allchurch as player-manager in 1978 but left after a single season and finished his playing career with BP Llandarcy. Although primarily a wing half in his professional career, he played in numerous positions during his non-league career, including as a central defender and a forward.

== Career ==
=== Football League ===
Houston began his career with Cardiff City, joining the club at the age of fifteen in 1963 alongside Dai Yorath. Cardiff manager Jimmy Scoular had brought several Scottish junior players to the club, handing Houston his professional debut on 23 October 1965 in a 2–1 defeat to Bolton Wanderers at the age of seventeen. Including his debut he played in ten consecutive league matches in the Second Division in place of Gareth Williams. However, when Williams returned to his usual role, Houston struggled to maintain his place and played in seven further league matches during the 1965–66 season.

The following season, he made only a single appearance during a 1–1 draw with Derby County. He left the club in 1967 to sign for Crystal Palace, where his friend Yorath had moved several months earlier. However, despite playing regularly at reserve team level, Houston never appeared for Palace's first team.

=== Margate ===
After leaving Palace, Houston was offered a deal with Romford but rejected the offer in order to sign for Margate in January 1938. For the third time in his career, his friend Dai Yorath also made the same move. He made his debut for the club in a 3–1 victory over Cheltenham Town in the Southern Football League and scored his first goal a month later, during a 3–1 victory over Weymouth. In his first season at the club, he made 40 appearances in all competitions, scoring five times, and helped the side win the Southern Football League Cup after beating Ramsgate. Having drawn 1–1 and 0–0 in the two legs of the final, the tie went to a replay which Margate won 3–1.

The following season, Houston made 61 appearances in all competitions and was used as a forward for a large part of the campaign. In his first appearance in the position, he scored a brace during a 4–4 draw with Nuneaton Borough in October 1968. A month later, Margate played a benefit match for manager Almer Hall against West Ham United. The match ended in a 6–6 draw with Houston scoring five of his side's goals. His performance prompted West Ham to scout Houston during the season although no transfer ever materialised. He scored in the club's following fixture, against Northampton Town in the first round of the FA Cup and, later in the season, scored in the final of the Kent Floodlight Cup as Margate defeated Maidstone 4–2 on aggregate.

In Margate's following two seasons, Houston made over 130 appearances in all competitions and played as defender, midfielder, winger and forward. He would later settle into a central defensive role and, during the 1972–73 season he played in Margate's run to the third round of the FA Cup for only the second time in their history. After advancing past Dagenham and Walton & Hersham in the opening rounds, they were drawn against Tottenham Hotspur but suffered a 6–0 defeat.

The 1972–73 season also saw Houston named the club's player of the year, with manager Les Riggs describing Houston as "a credit to the club." However, the following season, he fell out of favour midway through the campaign and appeared largely as a substitute after the Christmas period. Having made 395 appearances during his seven year spell with the club, he was released at the end of the 1973–74 season.

=== Later years ===
Following his release, Houston signed for Dover but a promotion in his day job led to him relocating his family to South Wales and subsequently departing the club after a month. He initially remained away from football after moving but eventually joined Pontardawe Athletic who were managed by his former Cardiff teammate Ivor Allchurch. Houston played three seasons under Allchurch before succeeding him as player-manager when he decided to step down. However, Houston left the position after a single season. He moved on to BP Llandarcy where he played until 1986, including a brief spell as player-manager in 1985. He retires from football at the age of 37.

== Personal life ==
After leaving professional football in 1968, Houston worked in several jobs alongside his playing career. He was employed as a civil servant in London before moving to Canterbury. In 1971, he transferred to work at Margate County Court. In later life, he worked as a clerk for the Driver and Vehicle Licensing Agency in Swansea and lived in Bryncoch.

He married his partner Ann, who was from the Cardiff area, in 1971 and the pair had two children together, Craig and Leah.

== Honours ==
Margate

- Southern Football League Cup winner: 1968
