= Nicolás Biglianti =

Uruguayan footballer (1974–2026)

Personal information
- Full name: Nicolás Fernando Biglianti Ruiz
- Date of birth: 18 October 1974
- Place of birth: Canelones, Uruguay
- Date of death: 2 April 2026 (aged 51)
- Place of death: Montevideo, Uruguay
- Height: 1.84 m (6 ft 0 in)
- Position: Goalkeeper

Senior career*
Years	Team	Apps	(Gls)
1997–2004	Liverpool Montevideo		
2005–2006	Central Español		
2007	Fénix		
2007	Rampla Juniors	14	(0)
2008	Peñarol	10	(0)
2009–2011	Atenas	8+	(0)
2011	Plaza Colonia	11	(0)
2012	Liverpool Montevideo	0	(0)
- * Club domestic league appearances and goals

Nicolás Fernando Biglianti Ruiz (18 October 1974 – 2 April 2026) was a Uruguayan footballer who played as a goalkeeper. Known as "El Canario", he had a 15-year professional career, which he started and finished at Liverpool Montevideo. He represented seven clubs and won the Torneo Clausura with Peñarol in 2008.

== Career ==
Born in Canelones, Biglianti began playing football for local clubs Huracán Progreso and San Francisco before winning the southern championship with the representative team of Canelones Department. He then began his professional career at Liverpool of Montevideo. After his release by the club in 2004, he briefly left football and worked as a welder with his uncle.

Biglianti resumed his career at Central Español under manager Julio César Antúnez, winning promotion from the Uruguayan Segunda División in 2005. He then played for Fénix and Rampla Juniors in 2007, and had a trial at Aurora of Bolivia in January 2008.

The following month, Biglianti returned to the Uruguayan capital to join Peñarol, the club he supported, on a one-year deal. After two games, he was ruled out with an injury in training and only returned for the last game of the season, as his side won the Clausura. On 13 July 2008 in the Uruguayan Clásico against Nacional, his team won 2–0 and he was fouled by opposing captain Richard Morales, who was sent off and threw his shirt into the Peñarol crowd.

Biglianti later played for Atenas and Plaza Colonia before ending his professional career back at Liverpool Montevideo in 2012. He then returned to his native department to play for Juanicó and Darling de Canelones.

In July 2016, Biglianti replaced the departed Washington Aires as goalkeeping coach at Cerro. He managed Darling de Canelones during his cancer treatment.

== Illness and death ==
In February 2024, Biglianti announced that he had a tumour in his pancreas and opened a fundraiser for 100,000 Uruguayan pesos for a biopsy as his health insurance would not cover it. He had the malignant tumour removed in São Paulo, Brazil, and underwent chemotherapy until October; in February 2025, there was an increase in tumour markers in the scar and Biglianti had to undergo chemotherapy again, as the location was too close to major arteries for another operation.

Biglianti died of pancreatic cancer on 2 April 2026, at the age of 51.
