= Ray Hiron =

English footballer (1943–2020)

Personal information
- Full name: Raymond Michael Charles Hiron
- Date of birth: 22 July 1943
- Place of birth: Gosport, England
- Date of death: 5 April 2020 (aged 76)
- Position: Forward

Senior career*
| Years | Team | Apps | (Gls) |
- Fareham Town
| 1964–1975 | Portsmouth | 330 | (110) |
| 1975–1978 | Reading | 92 | (14) |
- Fareham Town
| Total | | 422 | (124) |
- * Club domestic league appearances and goals

Raymond Michael Charles Hiron (22 July 1943 – 5 April 2020) was an English footballer who played in the Football League for Portsmouth and Reading and in non-league football for Fareham Town.

Hiron died on 5 April 2020, at the age of 76.
