= Doug Curtin =

Welsh footballer (1947–2022)

Personal information
- Full name: Douglas James Curtin
- Date of birth: 15 September 1947
- Place of birth: Cardiff, Wales
- Date of death: 6 August 2022 (aged 74)
- Position: Winger

Senior career*
Years	Team	Apps	(Gls)
1964–1965	Cardiff City	0	(0)
1965–1966	Mansfield Town	3	(0)
Total		3	(0)
- * Club domestic league appearances and goals

Douglas James Curtin (15 September 1947 – 6 August 2022) was a Welsh professional footballer who played in the Football League for Mansfield Town.
