= Maycon Canário =

Brazilian footballer (born 1994)

Personal information
- Full name: Maycon Lucas Nogueira Mansano
- Date of birth: 28 July 1994 (age 32)
- Place of birth: Porecatu, Brazil
- Height: 1.74 m (5 ft 9 in)
- Position: Midfielder

Team information
- Current team: PAEEK
- Number: 55

Senior career*
Years	Team	Apps	(Gls)
2013–2017	Athletico Paranaense	0	(0)
2015	→ Foz do Iguaçu (loan)	0	(0)
2015	→ Inter de Lages (loan)	1	(0)
2016	→ Paranavaí (loan)		
2016	→ Paraná (loan)	0	(0)
2017	Maringá		
2018	Foz do Iguaçu	0	(0)
2018	Portuguesa		
2018–2019	Varzim B	7	(0)
2019–	PAEEK		
- * Club domestic league appearances and goals as of 18:02, 20 June 2019 (UTC)

Maycon Lucas Nogueira Mansano (born 28 July 1994), commonly known as Maycon or Maycon Canário, is a Brazilian footballer who currently plays as a midfielder for PAEEK.

== Career statistics ==
=== Club ===
As of 20 June 2019.

Club	Season	League			State League		National Cup		League Cup		Other		Total	
Club	Season	Division	Apps	Goals	Apps	Goals	Apps	Goals	Apps	Goals	Apps	Goals	Apps	Goals
Athletico Paranaense	2013	Série A	0	0	1 (Note: Appearances in the Campeonato Paranaense)	0	0	0	–		0	0	1	0
Athletico Paranaense	2014	Série A	0	0	0	0	0	0	–		0	0	0	0
Athletico Paranaense	2015	Série A	0	0	0	0	0	0	–		0	0	0	0
Athletico Paranaense	2016	Série A	0	0	0	0	0	0	–		0	0	0	0
Athletico Paranaense	2017	Série A	0	0	0	0	0	0	–		0	0	0	0
Athletico Paranaense	Total		0	0	1	0	0	0	0	0	0	0	1	0
Foz do Iguaçu (loan)	2015	Série D	0	0	1	0	0	0	–		0	0	1	0
Inter de Lages (loan)	2015	Série D	1	0	0	0	0	0	–		0	0	1	0
Paraná (loan)	2016	Série B	0	0	0	0	0	0	–		0	0	0	0
Foz do Iguaçu	2018	–			12	0	0	0	–		0	0	12	0
Varzim B	2018–19	Elite Série 1 AF Porto	7	0	–		–		–		0	0	7	0
Career total			8	0	14	0	0	0	0	0	0	0	22	0
