= Frank Haydock =

English footballer

Personal information
- Date of birth: 29 November 1940 (age 85)
- Place of birth: Eccles, Lancashire, England
- Height: 6 ft 1/2 in (1.84 m)
- Position: Centre-half

Youth career
- 1956–1957: Blackpool
- 1957–1959: Manchester United

Senior career*
Years	Team	Apps	(Gls)
1959–1963	Manchester United	6	(0)
1963–1965	Charlton Athletic	84	(4)
1965–1969	Portsmouth	72	(1)
1969–1970	Southend United	33	(4)
1972-1976	Fleetwood	172	(15)
- * Club domestic league appearances and goals

Frank Haydock (born 29 November 1940) is an English former footballer who played at centre-half for several clubs, including Manchester United, Charlton Athletic and Portsmouth. His brother, Billy, was also a professional footballer who played for Manchester City, Crewe Alexandra and Stockport County.

== Career ==
Born in Eccles, Lancashire, Haydock began his football career as an amateur with Blackpool in 1956. A year later, he signed amateur forms with Manchester United, before turning professional in December 1959. He made his Manchester United debut on 20 August 1960, playing at centre half in a 3–1 home defeat to Blackburn Rovers. He also played in the same position in the next three matches, before the number 5 jersey was usurped, first by Ronnie Cope and then Bill Foulkes, a convert from right-back. It was more than a year before Haydock returned to the United first team, filling in for Foulkes for a home game against Birmingham City on 14 October 1961. He only made one more appearances for the first team after that, a 3–2 away defeat to Nottingham Forest on the final day of the 1962–63 Football League season.

Haydock was sold to Charlton Athletic for £10,000 in August 1963. He played for Charlton for two and a half years, making 84 appearances and scoring four goals before a transfer to Portsmouth in December 1965. In a Portsmouth career spanning just over three years, Haydock made 72 appearances and scored one goal. He was then transferred to Southend United in February 1969, spending a year there. He moved to Northern Premier League club Fleetwood in 1972, initially as a player before becoming player-manager, remaining there until the club folded in 1976.
