= Frank Brogan (footballer) =

Scottish footballer (1942–2021)

Personal information
- Full name: Frank Anthony Brogan
- Date of birth: 3 August 1942
- Place of birth: Glasgow, Scotland
- Date of death: 29 April 2021 (aged 78)
- Place of death: Falkirk, Scotland
- Height: 5 ft 10 in (1.78 m)
- Position: Winger

Senior career*
Years	Team	Apps	(Gls)
1961–1964	Celtic	37	(13)
1964–1971	Ipswich Town	223	(69)
1971–1973	Halifax Town	27	(6)
Total		287	(88)
- * Club domestic league appearances and goals

Frank Anthony Brogan (3 August 1942 – 29 April 2021) was a Scottish professional footballer who played as a winger. During his career he made over 200 appearances for Ipswich Town.

Brogan joined Celtic from St Roch's in 1960, and scored the club's 5000th league goal during the 1962–63 season. His younger brother Jim had a longer association with the Glasgow club. The siblings played in two matches alongside one another for Celtic.

Brogan died in Falkirk on 29 April 2021, aged 78.
