= Keith Ellis (footballer) =

English footballer (1935–2026)

Personal information
- Full name: Keith Duncan Ellis
- Date of birth: 6 November 1935
- Place of birth: Sheffield, England
- Date of death: 11 October 2026 (aged 90)
- Position: Forward

Senior career*
| Years | Team | Apps | (Gls) |
| 1955–1964 | Sheffield Wednesday | 102 | (52) |
| 1964 | Scunthorpe United | 10 | (5) |
| 1964–1965 | Cardiff City | 22 | (9) |
| 1965–1966 | Lincoln City | 7 | (0) |
- * Club domestic league appearances and goals

Keith Duncan Ellis (6 November 1935 – 11 October 2026) was an English professional footballer who played as a forward. During his career, he made over 100 appearances in the Football League most notably for Sheffield Wednesday.

== Career ==
Ellis began his career with Sheffield Wednesday, making his professional debut in March 1955 against Preston North End. However, due to the form of Roy Shiner, he found first-team chances limited in his first few season before becoming a regular following the appointment of Harry Catterick as manager. His most prolific season at the club came in 1960–61, scoring 19 times including a hattrick during a 7–2 victory over Manchester United on 1 February 1961. He fell out favour at the club during the 1963–64 season and was sold to Scunthorpe United in March 1964, but left the club six months later to join Cardiff City in exchange for Dick Scott. He spent one season at Ninian Park before finishing his league career with Lincoln City.

== Death ==
Ellis died on 11 October 2026, aged 90.
