= Dave Wilson (footballer, born 1944) =

English footballer

Personal information
- Full name: David Wilson
- Date of birth: 4 October 1944 (age 82)
- Place of birth: Wednesfield, England
- Position: Striker

Senior career*
Years	Team	Apps	(Gls)
1962–1965	Nottingham Forest	9	(1)
1965–1967	Carlisle United	55	(23)
1967–1969	Grimsby Town	63	(22)
1969–1970	Walsall	35	(10)
1970–1971	Burnley	13	(0)
1971–1975	Chesterfield	128	(21 played for a team in South Africa)
Total		303	(77)
- * Club domestic league appearances and goals

David Wilson (born 4 October 1944 in Wednesfield) is an English former professional footballer who played as a striker.
