= Mike Kenning =

English footballer

Personal information
- Full name: Michael John Kenning
- Date of birth: 18 August 1940
- Place of birth: Erdington, England
- Date of death: 15 March 2025 (aged 84)
- Position: Right winger

Senior career*
Years	Team	Apps	(Gls)
1960–1961	Aston Villa	3	(0)
1961–1963	Shrewsbury Town	62	(17)
1963–1967	Charlton Athletic	154	(43)
1967–1968	Norwich City	44	(9)
1968–1969	Wolverhampton Wanderers	41	(5)
1969–1972	Charlton Athletic	67	(12)
1972–1973	Watford	41	(2)
1973–1974	Atherstone Town	?	(?)
Total		412	(88)
- * Club domestic league appearances and goals

Michael John Kenning (18 August 1940 - 15 March 2025) was an English footballer who played as a winger in the Football League. Born in Erdington, Warwickshire, Kenning emigrated to South Africa after his playing career.
