= David Summerhayes =

Welsh footballer

Personal information
- Full name: David Michael Summerhayes
- Date of birth: 21 March 1947 (age 79)
- Place of birth: Cardiff, Wales
- Position: Wing half

Youth career
- Cardiff City

Senior career*
Years	Team	Apps	(Gls)
1965–1968	Cardiff City	13	(0)
- Hereford United
Total		13	(0)
- * Club domestic league appearances and goals

David Michael Summerhayes (born 21 March 1947) is a Welsh former professional footballer who played as a wing half.

== Career ==
Summerhayes played in the English Football League for Cardiff City, before playing non-league football with Hereford United.
