= Peter Denton (footballer) =

English footballer

Peter Robert Denton (1 March 1946 – 6 October 2016) was an English footballer who played as a Winger. Denton played in the Football League for Coventry City and Luton Town.

Denton died on 7 October 2016 after a sudden worsening from a heart condition.
