= Ken Pound =

English footballer

John Henry Kenneth Pound (born 24 August 1944) is an English former professional footballer who played as a winger or inside forward for Portsmouth, Swansea City, Bournemouth and Gillingham between 1962 and 1971.
