= Barrie Hole =

Welsh footballer (1942–2019)

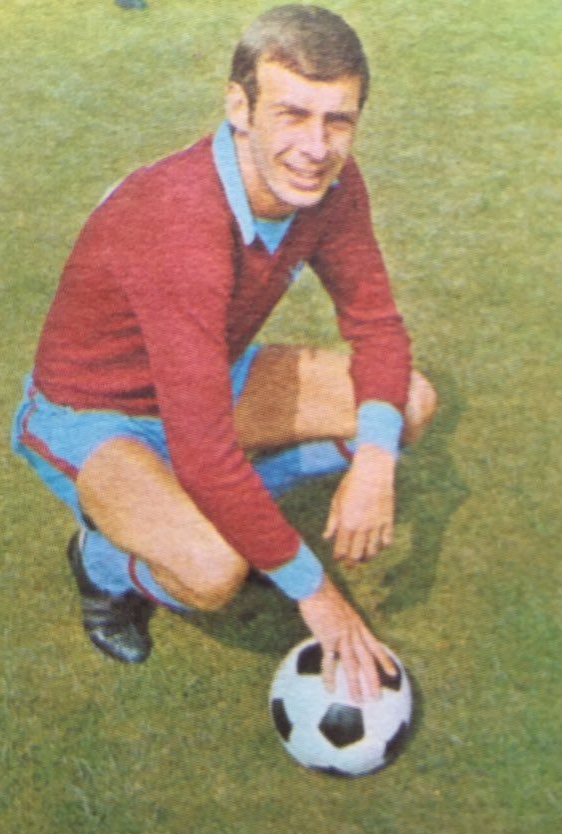

Personal information
- Birth name: Barrington Gerard Hole
- Date of birth: 16 September 1942
- Place of birth: Swansea, Wales
- Date of death: 25 March 2019 (aged 76)
- Position: Midfielder

Senior career*
Years	Team	Apps	(Gls)
1959–1966	Cardiff City	208	(16)
1966–1968	Blackburn Rovers	79	(13)
1968–1970	Aston Villa	47	(6)
1970–1972	Swansea City	78	(3)
Total		412	(38)

International career
1963–1970	Wales	30	(0)
- * Club domestic league appearances and goals

Barrington Gerard Hole (16 September 1942 – 25 March 2019) was a Welsh professional footballer who played as a midfielder. A Wales international, he began his career with Cardiff City and made his professional debut as a teenager.

== Career ==
Hole's father Billy had been a professional footballer and played for Swansea Town before World War II, making over 400 appearances and playing in the club's first ever fixture in The Football League. His older brothers Colin and Alan had also both played for their hometown club Swansea, although Colin never made a first team appearance. Barrie did not initially follow the family tradition and instead joined their rivals Cardiff City. He made his league debut as a seventeen-year-old during a 4–3 victory over Luton Town in February 1960 during a season when Cardiff gained promotion to the first division. Soon establishing himself in the Bluebirds side, even playing as an emergency striker on occasions, he was a vital member of the side, including being ever present during the 1964–65 season. During his time at Ninian Park, Hole made his debut for the Welsh national team in 1963 in a British Home Championship game against Northern Ireland which Wales won 4–1. Hole had become a regular for the national team when he was signed by Blackburn Rovers in July 1966 for £40,000.

In September 1968, after just two years at Blackburn, he moved, this time to Aston Villa under the management of Tommy Cummings for £60,000. Cummings was a drinker and Hole's own relationship with alcohol was hinted at from the terraces: "He's up. He's down. He's in the Rose and Crown...Barrie Hole, Barrie Hole." When Cummings was sacked in November 1968, Villa caretaker Arthur Cox dropped Hole with the result that he walked-out on the club, returning to his South Wales home. On his return to the club, Hole was suspended for two weeks, scoring on his return to the team. Chairman Doug Ellis received frequent complaints from disgruntled fans over players drinking in the Fox and Dog, Four Oaks on the Friday night before the Saturday game. One time, when new manager, Tommy Docherty, was staying with him, he received such a call. The two men decided to catch the miscreants red-handed and pulled into the car park in Ellis's Rolls-Royce. Possibly from their conspicuous mode of transport, by the time they reached the players' table, each footballer was sitting with a glass of orange juice.

Despite his issues, in 1969, Hole won the Aston Villa Lions Club Terrace Trophy for the best player at Aston Villa as decided by the fans.

In May 1970, Hole was signed to Swansea City by then manager Roy Bentley for £20,000. It was during his time here that Hole played his last match for Wales, a Euros qualifier against Romania which was a 0–0 draw. Hole played for Swansea for two years before fully retiring from football in May 1972.

After retiring from football he ran a newsagents in Swansea before selling it in 2004.

Hole died in March 2019 aged 76.
