= Lyn Davies =

Welsh footballer (born 1947)

Personal information
- Full name: David Lyn Davies
- Date of birth: 29 September 1947 (age 79)
- Place of birth: Neath, Wales
- Position: Goalkeeper

Senior career*
Years	Team	Apps	(Gls)
1965–1968	Cardiff City	16	(0)
1968–1969	Hereford United	49	(0)
1969–1972	Llanelli		
1972–1973	Swansea City	3	(0)

International career
1966	Wales U23	1	(0)
- * Club domestic league appearances and goals

David Lyn Davies (born 29 September 1947) is a Welsh former professional footballer and Wales under-23 international. During his career he made 19 appearances in the Football League.

== Career ==
Born in Neath, Davies began his career at Cardiff City, signing a professional deal in October 1965. After making eleven appearances during the 1965–66 season, he was brought back into the first team in September 1966 but conceded 24 goals in a five-game spell, including 7–1 defeats to Wolverhampton Wanderers and Plymouth Argyle. During this spell he also made his debut for the Wales under-23 side and suffered another heavy defeat in an 8–0 loss to England under-23s at Molineux Stadium.

With his confidence shattered, Davies left the club, moving into non-league football with spells at Hereford United and Llanelli, where he helped the club win the Welsh League during the 1970–71 season, before returning to The Football League with Swansea City. Signed by Roy Bentley in July 1972, he spent one season at Vetch Field as understudy to Tony Millington, making three league appearances before joining BP Llandarcy.

== After retirement ==
Davies later worked as a rigger before becoming a police officer.
