= Graham Coldrick =

Welsh footballer

Personal information
- Full name: Graham George Coldrick
- Date of birth: 6 November 1945
- Place of birth: Newport, Wales
- Date of death: 19 July 2022 (aged 76)
- Height: 5 ft 11 in (1.80 m)
- Position: Defender

Senior career*
Years	Team	Apps	(Gls)
1963–1970	Cardiff City	96	(2)
1970–1975	Newport County	157	(10)
1975–19??	Merthyr Tydfil		

International career
1966–1967	Wales U23	2	(0)
- * Club domestic league appearances and goals

Graham George Coldrick (born 6 November 1945) was a Welsh professional footballer. During his career, he made over 200 appearances in the English Football League in spells with Cardiff City and Newport County.

== Career ==
Born in Newport, Coldrick began his career at Cardiff City. A defender by trade, he made his league debut for the Bluebirds as a makeshift forward in 1963 before reverting to defence. Throughout his stay at Ninian Park he was constantly troubled by knee injuries and he eventually lost his place in the side to the on form full back pairing of David Carver and Gary Bell. He was allowed to leave the club in 1970 to join Newport County for a fee of £4,000, a club record for the Exiles at the time. He was quick to establish himself in the first team for the Somerton Park club and went on to play there for five years before joining Merthyr Tydfil. In 2015, Coldrick became the second player to be inducted into Newport County's hall of fame.
