= Keith Todd =

Welsh footballer (1941–2022)

Personal information
- Full name: Keith Harris Todd
- Date of birth: 2 March 1941
- Place of birth: Clydach, Wales
- Date of death: 8 January 2022 (aged 80)
- Position: Forward

Senior career*
Years	Team	Apps	(Gls)
- Clydach United
1959–1968	Swansea Town	198	(78)
1968–1975	Pembroke Borough		
- * Club domestic league appearances and goals

Keith Harris Todd (2 March 1941 – 8 January 2022) was a Welsh professional footballer who played in the Football League as a forward. He also played for Clydach United before joining Swansea, and spent seven years at Pembroke Borough after his time with Swansea. Todd died on 8 January 2022, at the age of 80.
