= George Andrews (footballer) =

English footballer

Personal information
- Full name: George Andrews
- Date of birth: 23 April 1942 (age 84)
- Place of birth: Dudley, England
- Height: 6 ft 0 in (1.83 m)
- Position: Striker

Senior career*
Years	Team	Apps	(Gls)
1960–1961	Luton Town	0	(0)
1961–1965	Lower Gornal Athletic		
1965–1967	Cardiff City	43	(21)
1967–1970	Southport	117	(41)
1970–1973	Shrewsbury Town	124	(49)
1973–1977	Walsall	159	(38)
1977	Worcester City		
1977–1978	Telford United		
–	Dudley Town		
–	Oldswinford		
–	Solihull Borough		
1982–1983	Tipton Town		

Managerial career
- 1982–1983: Tipton Town
- * Club domestic league appearances and goals

George Andrews (born 23 April 1942) is an English former professional footballer. During his career, he made over 400 appearances in the Football League and scored 149 goals in spells at Cardiff City, Southport, Shrewsbury Town and Walsall. He scored Walsall's winning goal in their shock FA Cup third round victory over Newcastle United in January 1975.

== Career ==
Andrews began his career as an apprentice with Luton Town in the late 1950s, turning professional in 1960 but leaving the following year without making a first team appearance having suffered from homesickness. He continued his career at non-league level with Lower Gornal Athletic in 1961, reaching the Football League in October 1965 after signing for Cardiff City, along with Gary Bell for a fee of £2,100, a record transfer fee for Gornal that still stands, having been spotted by manager Jimmy Scoular. He made his first team debut just a few days later in a 2–1 defeat against Portsmouth, before scoring his first goal for the club a week later in a second 2–1 defeat against Bolton Wanderers. He went on to finish his first professional season with 20 goals in all competitions and scored 6 in the opening 12 matches of the following season before being displaced by new signing Bobby Brown and was allowed to leave to join Southport for £6,000 in February 1967, a club record fee at the time.

Signed by manager Billy Bingham as a replacement for Jim Fryatt who had left to join Torquay United, he scored on his debut during a 3–0 victory over Barnsley on 4 March 1967. He quickly established himself in the first-team and, on the final day of the 1966–67 season, he scored the only goal of the game during a 1–0 victory over Southend United which secured promotion to the Third Division for Southport. He left Southport in November 1969 after the club began suffering financial difficulties, joining Shrewsbury Town for a fee of £10,000.

In January 1973, Andrews signed for Walsall in a swap deal, along with £6,000, for Geoff Morris. He spent the final four seasons of his professional career there, playing 159 league games and scoring 38 goals. He retired from professional football in 1977, though he continued at non-league level with Telford United, Dudley Town, Oldswinford, Solihull Borough and player-manager at Tipton Town.

== After football ==
On retiring from football, he was employed by Dudley MBC as a gardener tending the parks and gardens of Dudley until his retirement in April 2007.

He was married to Janet for nearly 50 years until her death in November 2012 and has two daughters, Priscilla (born 1968) and Melissa (born 1971).
