= Greg Farrell =

Scottish footballer

Personal information
- Full name: Gregory James Philip Farrell
- Date of birth: 19 March 1944 (age 82)
- Place of birth: Motherwell, Scotland
- Position: Winger

Senior career*
Years	Team	Apps	(Gls)
1962–1964	Birmingham City	4	(0)
1964–1967	Cardiff City	94	(8)
1967–1970	Bury	83	(15)
- * Club domestic league appearances and goals

Gregory James Philip Farrell (born 19 March 1944) is a Scottish former professional footballer.

Beginning his career at Birmingham City, Farrell found his chances limited and George Swindin signed him for a moderate fee to play for Cardiff City in March 1964. Playing as a winger, he often showed flashes of brilliance, including scoring one and supplying four other goals during a 5–3 win over Middlesbrough in May 1966. He eventually left the club in 1967 to sign for Bury. Farrell later went on to play in South Africa before retiring.
