= Dilwyn John =

Welsh footballer and snooker player

Personal information
- Date of birth: 3 June 1944 (age 82)
- Place of birth: Tonypandy, Wales
- Position: Goalkeeper

Senior career*
Years	Team	Apps	(Gls)
1961–1967	Cardiff City	88	(0)
1967–1970	Swansea City	80	(0)
1970–?	Hereford United	?	(?)
	Merthyr Tydfil	?	(?)
- * Club domestic league appearances and goals

Dilwyn E. John (born 3 June 1944) is a Welsh former professional footballer and amateur snooker player. He made more than 160 appearances in The Football League for Cardiff City and Swansea City.

== Football career ==
A goalkeeper, John began his career at Cardiff City, making his debut at the age of seventeen in September 1961 during a 3–2 win over Chelsea. He struggled to maintain the number one spot and found himself in and out of the Cardiff side. During his time at Ninian Park, he played for the Wales U23 side and eventually moved to Swansea City in March 1967. He managed to stem the flow of goals the club were conceding but could not help them avoid relegation to Division Four but helped them to promotion two years later before leaving to play for non-league football for Hereford United and Merthyr Tydfil before retiring.

== Snooker career ==
John was also a talented snooker player and became Welsh amateur champion during the 1980s and was runner-up in the 1985 World Amateur Championships.
