= Bernie Lewis =

Welsh footballer

Personal information
- Full name: Bernard Lewis
- Date of birth: 12 March 1945 (age 81)
- Place of birth: Merthyr Tydfil, Wales
- Position: Winger

Senior career*
Years	Team	Apps	(Gls)
1963–1967	Cardiff City	88	(7)
1967–1970	Watford	51	(9)
1970–1972	Southend United	56	(6)
1972–?	Chelmsford City	?	(?)

International career
	Wales U23	5	(0)
- * Club domestic league appearances and goals

Bernard Lewis (born 12 March 1945) is a former Welsh professional footballer.

Born in Merthyr Tydfil, Lewis was working as an apprentice mechanic before joining Cardiff City as a part-time professional, making his debut in a 2–1 defeat to Rotherham United in January 1964 as a right winger, although he would switch to the left soon after. He played for the Wales U23 side and in November 1967 he was signed by Watford for £7,000. On his debut for the club he played a part in all but one of the goals during a 7-1 thrashing of Grimsby Town, but he struggled to hold down a regular first team spot and was allowed to join Southend United in 1970 where he finished his league career before joining Chelmsford City.
