= George Johnston (footballer, born 1947) =

Scottish footballer (1947–2025)

Personal information
- Full name: George Johnston
- Date of birth: 21 March 1947
- Place of birth: Glasgow, Scotland
- Date of death: 9 February 2025 (aged 77)
- Place of death: Cardiff, Wales
- Position: Forward

Youth career
- 1962–1964: Cardiff City

Senior career*
Years	Team	Apps	(Gls)
1964–1967	Cardiff City	60	(21)
1967–1969	Arsenal	21	(3)
1969–1970	Birmingham City	9	(1)
1970	→ Walsall (loan)	5	(1)
1970–1972	Fulham	39	(12)
1972–1973	Hereford United	18	(5)
1973–1974	Newport County	3	(0)
- * Club domestic league appearances and goals

George Johnston (21 March 1947 – 9 February 2025) was a Scottish professional footballer who played as a forward. He played more than 150 matches in the English Football League.

== Life and career ==
Johnston was born in Glasgow. He began his football career as a junior at Cardiff City, turning professional in 1964 and making his debut at the end of the 1964–65 season at the age of 17. He was part of Cardiff's 1965 Welsh Cup-winning team. The following year he settled into the side and, playing alongside the likes of John Charles and John Toshack, he finished as the club's top scorer with a total of 23 goals. In March 1967, Johnston played in a benefit match for victims of the Aberfan disaster against Arsenal and scored twice against the London club, which persuaded them to offer £20,000 to Cardiff to sign him.

He made his debut for Arsenal on 19 August 1967, against Stoke City, and made 17 appearances in his first season, 1967-68. However, he could not hold down a place in 1968–69 and was dropped to the reserves, where he won a Football Combination winners' medal. Out of the Arsenal first team, he joined Second Division club Birmingham City in the summer of 1969, for a fee of £30,000. He made 25 appearances and scored 3 goals for Arsenal.

Signed as a replacement for Fred Pickering, Johnston failed to hold down a first-team place. A period on loan at Walsall immediately preceded a £6,000 move to Fulham, where he spent two years. A season with Hereford United followed, and one more with Newport County, before, at the age of just 26, he dropped out of league football.

== Later life and death ==
Johnston later settled in Cardiff and worked for a marine engineering company. He died there on 9 February 2025, aged 77.

== Honours ==
Cardiff City

- Welsh Cup: 1965
