= Gareth Williams (footballer, born 1941) =

Welsh footballer (1941–2018)

Personal information
- Full name: Gareth Cyril Williams
- Date of birth: 30 October 1941
- Place of birth: Hendon, England
- Date of death: 4 June 2018 (aged 76)
- Place of death: Las Palmas, Spain
- Position: Midfielder

Senior career*
Years	Team	Apps	(Gls)
1961–1967	Cardiff City	161	(14)
1967–1971	Bolton Wanderers	109	(11)
1971–1973	Bury	42	(4)
Total		312	(29)
- * Club domestic league appearances and goals

Gareth Cyril Williams (30 October 1941 – 4 June 2018) was a Welsh professional footballer who played as a midfielder.

== Later life and death ==
He died at his home on Gran Canaria on 4 June 2018 at the age of 76.

== Honours ==
Cardiff City

- Welsh Cup: 1963–64, 1964–65, 1966–67
