= 1963–64 Cardiff City F.C. season =

Welsh football club season

Cardiff City
1963–64 season
- Manager: George Swindin
- Football League Second Division: 15th
- FA Cup: 3rd round
- League Cup: 2nd round
- Welsh Cup: Winners
- Top goalscorer: League: Ivor Allchurch (12); All: Mel Charles (17)
- Highest home attendance: 25,134 (v Manchester City, 28 August 1963)
- Lowest home attendance: 8,066 (v Charlton, 7 March 1964)
- Average home league attendance: 13,782
Home colours

The 1963–64 season was Cardiff City F.C.'s 37th season in the Football League. They competed in the 22-team Division Two, then the second tier of English football, finishing fifteenth.

== Players ==
Note: Flags indicate national team as defined under FIFA eligibility rules; some limited exceptions apply. Players may hold more than one non-FIFA nationality.

| Pos. | Nation | Player |
|---|---|---|
| GK | WAL | Dilwyn John |
| GK | WAL | Graham Vearncombe |
| DF | WAL | Colin Baker |
| DF | SCO | Alistair Brack |
| DF | WAL | Mel Charles |
| DF | WAL | Graham Coldrick |
| DF | WAL | Trevor Edwards |
| DF | SCO | Alec Milne |
| DF | SCO | Don Murray |
| DF | WAL | Trevor Peck |
| DF | WAL | Peter Rodrigues |
| DF | WAL | Ron Stitfall |
| DF | SCO | Jim Upton |
| MF | ENG | Albert Burns |
| MF | ENG | Bob Collins |

| No. | Pos. | Nation | Player |
|---|---|---|---|
| MF | SCO | Greg Farrell | |
| MF | WAL | Steve Gammon | |
| MF | WAL | Alan Harrington | |
| MF | WAL | Barrie Hole | |
| MF | ENG | Peter King | |
| MF | WAL | Bernie Lewis | |
| MF | WAL | Alan McIntosh | |
| MF | ENG | Dick Scott | |
| MF | WAL | Phil Watkins | |
| MF | ENG | Gareth Williams | |
| FW | WAL | Ivor Allchurch | |
| FW | WAL | John Charles | |
| FW | SCO | Tommy Halliday | |
| FW | BER | Dick Mallory | |
| FW | WAL | Derek Tapscott | |

== League standings ==
| Pos | Team | Pld | W | D | L | GF | GA | GAv | Pts | Qualification or relegation |
|---|---|---|---|---|---|---|---|---|---|---|
| 13 | Derby County | 42 | 14 | 11 | 17 | 56 | 67 | 0.836 | 39 | |
| 14 | Swindon Town | 42 | 14 | 10 | 18 | 57 | 69 | 0.826 | 38 | |
| 15 | Cardiff City | 42 | 14 | 10 | 18 | 56 | 81 | 0.691 | 38 | Qualification for the European Cup Winners' Cup first round |
| 16 | Leyton Orient | 42 | 13 | 10 | 19 | 54 | 72 | 0.750 | 36 | |
| 17 | Norwich City | 42 | 11 | 13 | 18 | 64 | 80 | 0.800 | 35 | |

Rules for classification: 1) Points; 2) Goal average; 3) Goals scored

=== Results by round ===
| Round | 1 | 2 | 3 | 4 | 5 | 6 | 7 | 8 | 9 | 10 | 11 | 12 | 13 | 14 | 15 | 16 | 17 | 18 | 19 | 20 | 21 | 22 | 23 | 24 | 25 | 26 | 27 | 28 | 29 | 30 | 31 | 32 | 33 | 34 | 35 | 36 | 37 | 38 | 39 | 40 | 41 | 42 |
|---|---|---|---|---|---|---|---|---|---|---|---|---|---|---|---|---|---|---|---|---|---|---|---|---|---|---|---|---|---|---|---|---|---|---|---|---|---|---|---|---|---|---|
| Ground | H | H | A | A | H | H | A | A | H | A | H | H | H | A | H | A | H | A | H | A | A | H | A | A | H | A | H | A | H | A | H | H | A | A | H | H | H | A | A | A | H | A |
| Result | W | D | W | L | L | W | L | L | D | D | D | W | D | L | D | W | W | L | W | L | L | L | L | L | W | D | L | L | W | L | D | D | W | L | W | W | W | D | L | W | L | L |
| Position | | | 1 | 10 | 14 | 11 | 12 | 15 | 15 | 16 | 14 | 11 | 14 | 16 | 14 | 12 | 9 | 10 | 10 | 11 | 13 | 16 | 18 | 18 | 17 | 17 | 18 | 18 | 18 | 17 | 18 | 17 | 17 | 17 | 17 | 17 | 15 | 15 | 15 | 13 | 14 | 15 |
| Points | 2 | 3 | 5 | 5 | 5 | 7 | 7 | 7 | 8 | 9 | 10 | 12 | 13 | 13 | 14 | 16 | 18 | 18 | 20 | 20 | 20 | 20 | 20 | 20 | 22 | 23 | 23 | 23 | 25 | 25 | 26 | 27 | 29 | 29 | 31 | 33 | 35 | 36 | 36 | 38 | 38 | 38 |

Source: Competitive matches
A = Away; H = Home; W = Win; D = Draw; L = Loss

== Fixtures and results ==
=== Second Division ===
| 24 August 1963 1 | Cardiff City | 3–1 | Norwich City | Cardiff |
| 15:15 | Peter King 26'; John Charles 43'; Ivor Allchurch 74' | | 40' Jim Conway | Stadium: Ninian Park; Attendance: 21,977; Referee: Harold Horner (Coventry) |

| 28 August 1963 2 | Cardiff City | 2–2 | Manchester City | Cardiff |
| 19:15 | Ivor Allchurch 68'; John Charles 90' | | 20' George Hannah; 62' Derek Kevan | Stadium: Ninian Park; Attendance: 25,134; Referee: David Smith (Stonehouse) |

| 30 August 1963 3 | Scunthorpe United | 1–2 | Cardiff City | Scunthorpe |
| | Ian Lawther | | Gareth Williams; Derek Tapscott | Stadium: Old Show Ground; Attendance: 8,366; Referee: James Cattlin (Rochdale) |

| 4 September 1963 4 | Manchester City | 4–0 | Cardiff City | Manchester |
| 19:30 | Paul Aimson 5', 70'; Derek Kevan 10'; Neil Young 80' | | | Stadium: Maine Road; Attendance: 22,138; Referee: Peter Baldwin (Middlesbrough) |

| 7 September 1963 5 | Cardiff City | 1–2 | Portsmouth | Cardiff |
| 15:15 | John Charles 55' | | 3' Roy Summersby; 77' Keith Blackburn | Stadium: Ninian Park; Attendance: 17,523 |

| 11 September 1963 6 | Cardiff City | 2–1 | Bury | Cardiff |
| 19:15 | Ivor Allchurch; Ivor Allchurch | | Bill Calder | Stadium: Ninian Park; Attendance: 15,855; Referee: Eric Jennings (Stourbridge) |

| 13 September 1963 7 | Rotherham United | 1–0 | Cardiff City | Rotherham |
| 19:15 | Ken Houghton | | | Stadium: Millmoor; Attendance: 11,568; Referee: Vernon Batty (Cheshire) |

| 17 September 1963 8 | Bury | 4–1 | Cardiff City | Bury |
| | Gordon Atherton 10'; Bill Calder 20'; Derek Mayers 34'; Paul Durrant 68' | | Ivor Allchurch | Stadium: Gigg Lane; Attendance: 11,918; Referee: RTE Langdale (Darlington) |

| 21 September 1963 9 | Cardiff City | 0–0 | Leeds United | Cardiff |
| 15:15 | | | | Stadium: Ninian Park; Attendance: 16,117; Referee: Denis Howell (Birmingham) |

| 28 September 1963 10 | Sunderland | 3–3 | Cardiff City | Sunderland |
| 15:00 | Nick Sharkey 6', 13'; Charlie Hurley 64' | | 8', 15', 25' Ivor Allchurch | Stadium: Roker Park; Attendance: 37,287; Referee: Roy Harper (South Yorkshire) |

| 2 October 1963 11 | Cardiff City | 0–0 | Grimsby Town | Cardiff |
| 19:15 | | | | Stadium: Ninian Park; Attendance: 10,657; Referee: Norman Matthews (Bicester) |

| 5 October 1963 12 | Cardiff City | 1–0 | Northampton Town | Cardiff |
| 15:15 | Mel Charles | | | Stadium: Ninian Park; Attendance: 10,178; Referee: Jack Taylor (Wolverhampton) |

| 19 October 1963 13 | Cardiff City | 1–1 | Swansea Town | Cardiff |
| 15:15 | Dick Scott (pen.) | | Brian Evans | Stadium: Ninian Park; Attendance: 21,417; Referee: Jim Finney (Hereford) |

| 26 October 1963 14 | Charlton Athletic | 5–2 | Cardiff City | London |
| 15:00 | Eddie Firmani 20'; Roy Matthews 23'; Len Glover 25'; Dennis Edwards 55'; Mike Kenning 89' | | 21' Alan McIntosh; 40' John Charles | Stadium: The Valley; Attendance: 26,534; Referee: Norman Burtenshaw (Norfolk) |

| 2 November 1963 15 | Cardiff City | 1–1 | Middlesbrough | Cardiff |
| 15:15 | John Charles | | Bryan Orritt | Stadium: Ninian Park; Attendance: 13,455 |

| 9 November 1963 16 | Newcastle United | 0–4 | Cardiff City | Newcastle |
| 15:00 | | | 31', 36' Peter King; 64' Ivor Allchurch; 78' John Charles | Stadium: St James' Park; Attendance: 38,495; Referee: Keith Walker (Maidstone) |

| 16 November 1963 17 | Cardiff City | 2–1 | Huddersfield Town | Cardiff |
| 15:15 | Alan McIntosh; Colin Baker | | Kevin Lewis | Stadium: Ninian Park; Attendance: 14,398 |

| 23 November 1963 18 | Derby County | 2–1 | Cardiff City | Derby |
| 15:00 | Mick Hopkinson; Phil Waller | | John Charles | Stadium: Baseball Ground; Attendance: 11,852 |

| 30 November 1963 19 | Cardiff City | 3–1 | Plymouth Argyle | Cardiff |
| 15:15 | John Charles 24', 84'; Ivor Allchurch 63' | Plymouth report | 76' Dave Corbett | Stadium: Ninian Park; Attendance: 11,193; Referee: Danny Lyden (Birmingham) |

| 7 December 1963 20 | Southampton | 3–2 | Cardiff City | Southampton |
| | Terry Paine; George Kirby; Ian White | | John Charles; Tommy Halliday | Stadium: The Dell; Attendance: 17,861 |

| 14 December 1963 21 | Norwich City | 5–1 | Cardiff City | Norwich |
| | Bill Punton 12'; Ron Davies 24', 44', 70'; Tommy Bryceland 38' | | Tommy Halliday | Stadium: Carrow Road; Attendance: 14,130 |

| 26 December 1963 22 | Cardiff City | 0–4 | Preston North End | Cardiff |
| 15:15 | | | (??) Dave Wilson; Ian Davidson | Stadium: Ninian Park; Attendance: 18,682; Referee: Bill Clements (West Bromwich) |

| 28 December 1963 23 | Preston North End | 4–0 | Cardiff City | Preston |
| | Nobby Lawton 23'; Alan Spavin 38'; Alex Dawson 42' (pen.), 74' | | | Stadium: Deepdale; Attendance: 19,458; Referee: WJ Downey |

| 11 January 1964 24 | Portsmouth | 5–0 | Cardiff City | Portsmouth |
| | Ron Saunders; Ron Saunders; John McClelland; Albert McCann; Mickey Lill | | | Stadium: Fratton Park; Attendance: 12,046; Referee: WJ Gale (Birmingham) |

| 17 January 1964 25 | Cardiff City | 2–1 | Rotherham United | Cardiff |
| 19:15 | Mel Charles; Dick Scott (pen.) | | Ken Houghton | Stadium: Ninian Park; Attendance: 8,773; Referee: DFC Wells (Luton) |

| 1 February 1964 26 | Leeds United | 1–1 | Cardiff City | Leeds |
| | Albert Johanneson 39' | | 19' Mel Charles | Stadium: Elland Road; Attendance: 28,056; Referee: Les Hamer (Bolton) |

| 8 February 1964 27 | Cardiff City | 0–2 | Sunderland | Cardiff |
| 15:15 | | | 86' George Mulhall; 88' Nick Sharkey | Stadium: Ninian Park; Attendance: 15,600; Referee: GWT Davis (Romford, Essex) |

| 15 February 1964 28 | Northampton Town | 2–1 | Cardiff City | Northampton |
| | Billy Hails; Peter Kane | | Mel Charles | Stadium: County Ground; Attendance: 11,871 |

| 22 February 1964 29 | Cardiff City | 2–1 | Leyton Orient | Cardiff |
| 15:15 | Dick Scott 65' (pen.); Mel Charles 73' | | 53' Malcolm Musgrove | Stadium: Ninian Park; Attendance: 8,690; Referee: J Mitchell |

| 29 February 1964 30 | Huddersfield Town | 2–1 | Cardiff City | Huddersfield |
| | Len White (pen.); Derek Stokes | | Dick Scott | Stadium: Leeds Road; Attendance: 10,580 |

| 7 March 1964 31 | Cardiff City | 1–1 | Charlton Athletic | Cardiff |
| 15:15 | John Charles 83' | | 12' Keith Peacock | Stadium: Ninian Park; Attendance: 8,066; Referee: Peter Brandwood (Walsall) |

| 20 March 1964 32 | Cardiff City | 2–2 | Newcastle United | Cardiff |
| 19:15 | Ivor Allchurch; Mel Charles | | (pen.) Ron McGarry; Bobby Cummings | Stadium: Ninian Park; Attendance: 9,096; Referee: JR Loynton (Solihull) |

| 27 March 1964 33 | Swindon Town | 1–2 | Cardiff City | Swindon |
| 15:00 | Frank Large 33' | Swindon report | 49' Peter King; 65' Bernie Lewis | Stadium: County Ground; Attendance: 22,318; Referee: Bill Clements (West Bromwich) |

| 28 March 1964 34 | Swansea Town | 3–0 | Cardiff City | Swansea |
| 15:15 | Derek Draper 5'; Brayley Reynolds 44', 82' | | | Stadium: Vetch Field; Attendance: 18,721; Referee: Eric Jennings (Stourbridge) |

| 30 March 1964 35 | Cardiff City | 1–0 | Swindon Town | Cardiff |
| 15:15 | Mel Charles | Swindon report | | Stadium: Ninian Park; Attendance: 14,033; Referee: Ken Burns (Stourbridge) |

| 4 April 1964 36 | Cardiff City | 2–1 | Derby County | Cardiff |
| 15:15 | Mel Charles; Peter King | | Gordon Hughes | Stadium: Ninian Park; Attendance: 8,238 |

| 8 April 1964 37 | Cardiff City | 3–1 | Scunthorpe United | Cardiff |
| 19:15 | Greg Farrell; Greg Farrell; Peter King | | Ian Lawther | Stadium: Ninian Park; Attendance: 9,618 |

| 11 April 1964 38 | Plymouth Argyle | 1–1 | Cardiff City | Plymouth |
| 15:15 | Johnny Williams 34' | Plymouth report | 20' Peter King | Stadium: Home Park; Attendance: 14,993; Referee: DFC Wells (Luton) |

| 13 April 1964 39 | Leyton Orient | 4–0 | Cardiff City | London |
| 19:30 | Ted Phillips; Ted Phillips; Dave Dunmore; Malcolm Musgrove | | | Stadium: Brisbane Road; Attendance: 7,278 |

| 15 April 1964 40 | Grimsby Town | 0–2 | Cardiff City | Grimsby |
| 19:15 | | | (pen.) Dick Scott; Mel Charles | Stadium: Blundell Park; Attendance: 8,914; Referee: JA Cattlin (Rochdale) |

| 18 April 1964 41 | Cardiff City | 2–4 | Southampton | Cardiff |
| 15:15 | Tony Knapp (o.g.); Gareth Williams | | John McGuigan; George O'Brien; Martin Chivers; Martin Chivers | Stadium: Ninian Park; Attendance: 10,727 |

| 24 April 1964 42 | Middlesbrough | 3–1 | Cardiff City | Middlesbrough |
| 19:00 | Ian Gibson; Arthur Horsfield (?) | | Ivor Allchurch | Stadium: Ayresome Park; Attendance: 8,472 |

=== League Cup ===
| 25 September 1963 Round 2 | Cardiff City | 2–2 | Wrexham | Cardiff |
| 19:15 | Derek Tapscott 2', 30' | Wrexham report | 46' Mike Metcalf; 77' Arfon Griffiths | Stadium: Ninian Park; Attendance: 4,600; Referee: Dennis Corbett (Wolverhampton) |

| 7 October 1963 Round 2 (Replay) | Wrexham | 1–1 (a.e.t.) | Cardiff City | Wrexham |
| 19:15 | Brian Whitehouse 90' | Wrexham report | 68' Peter King | Stadium: Racecourse; Attendance: 11,299; Referee: LW Faulkner (Liverpool) |

| 21 October 1963 Round 2 (2nd Replay) | Wrexham | 3–0 | Cardiff City | Wrexham |
| 19:15 | Ken Barnes 3' (pen.); Mike Metcalf 40'; Arfon Griffiths 47' | Wrexham report | | Stadium: Racecourse; Attendance: 8,838; Referee: Frank Cowen (Manchester) |

=== FA Cup ===
| 4 January 1964 3 | Cardiff City | 0–1 | Leeds United | Cardiff |
| 15:00 | | | 67' Billy Bremner | Stadium: Ninian Park; Attendance: 13,932; Referee: Denis Howell (Birmingham) |

=== Welsh Cup ===
| 25 January 1964 5 | Ebbw Vale | 1–6 | Cardiff City | Ebbw Vale |
| | Goal | | Peter King; Peter King; Bernie Lewis; Bernie Lewis; Mel Charles; Mel Charles | Stadium: Eugene Cross Park; Attendance: 4,000 |

| 19 February 1964 6 | Cardiff City | 3–1 | Chester | Cardiff |
| 19:15 | Barrie Hole; Mel Charles; Derek Tapscott | | Gary Talbot | Stadium: Ninian Park; Attendance: 3,120 |

| 11 March 1964 Semi Final | Newport County | 2–2 | Cardiff City | Swansea |
| 19:30 | Laurie Sheffield; Joe Bonson | | Ivor Allchurch; Mel Charles | Stadium: Vetch Field; Attendance: 5,200 |

| 25 March 1964 Semi Final (Replay) | Cardiff City | 1–0 | Newport County | Cardiff |
| 19:15 | Mel Charles | | | Stadium: Ninian Park; Attendance: 8,400; Referee: J Lowry (Neath) |

| 22 April 1964 Final (First Leg) | Bangor City | 2–0 | Cardiff City | Bangor |
| 18:30 | Eric Robinson 7'; Stan Edwards 63' (pen.) | | | Stadium: Farrar Road; Attendance: 10,000; Referee: Leo Callaghan (Merthyr Tydfil) |

| 29 April 1964 Final (Second Leg) | Cardiff City | 3–1 | Bangor City | Cardiff |
| 19:15 | Ivor Allchurch 10'; Bernie Lewis 23'; Mel Charles 75' | | 63' Reg Gray | Stadium: Ninian Park; Attendance: 6,000; Referee: Leo Callaghan (Merthyr Tydfil) |

| 4 May 1964 Final (Replay) | Bangor City | 0–2 | Cardiff City | Wrexham |
| 19:15 | | | 5', 70' Peter King | Stadium: Racecourse; Attendance: 10,014; Referee: Leo Callaghan (Merthyr Tydfil) |

== See also ==
- Cardiff City F.C. seasons
