= 1962–63 Cardiff City F.C. season =

Welsh football club season

Cardiff City
1962–63 season
- Manager: Bill Jones/George Swindin
- Football League Second Division: 10th
- FA Cup: 3rd round
- League Cup: 2nd round
- Welsh Cup: 6th round
- Top goalscorer: League: Peter Hooper (22); All: Peter Hooper (24)
- Highest home attendance: 27,569 (v Newcastle United, 18 August 1962)
- Lowest home attendance: 8,389 (v Preston, 6 May 1963)
- Average home league attendance: 15,567
Home colours

The 1962–63 season was Cardiff City F.C.'s 36th season in the Football League. They competed in the 22-team Division Two, then the second tier of English football, finishing tenth.

Following relegation the previous year and a poor start to the season, manager Bill Jones was replaced by George Swindin.

== Players ==
Note: Flags indicate national team as defined under FIFA eligibility rules; some limited exceptions apply. Players may hold more than one non-FIFA nationality.

Pos.	Nation	Player
GK	WAL	Dilwyn John
GK	EIR	Maurice Swan
GK	WAL	Graham Vearncombe
DF	WAL	Colin Baker
DF	SCO	Alistair Brack
DF	WAL	Mel Charles
DF	WAL	Trevor Edwards
DF	SCO	Alec Milne
DF	SCO	Don Murray
DF	WAL	Trevor Peck
DF	WAL	Frank Rankmore
DF	WAL	Peter Rodrigues
DF	WAL	Ron Stitfall
MF	ENG	Bob Collins

Pos.	Nation	Player
MF	WAL	Alan Durban
MF	WAL	Steve Gammon
MF	WAL	Alan Harrington
MF	WAL	Barrie Hole
MF	ENG	Peter King
MF	WAL	Alan McIntosh
MF	WAL	Phil Watkins
MF	ENG	Gareth Williams
FW	WAL	Ivor Allchurch
FW	SCO	Gordon Fraser
FW	ENG	Peter Hooper
FW	WAL	Derek Tapscott

== League standings ==
Pos	Team	Pld	W	D	L	GF	GA	GAv	Pts
8	Bury	42	18	11	13	51	47	1.085	47
9	Scunthorpe United	42	16	12	14	57	59	0.966	44
10	Cardiff City	42	18	7	17	83	73	1.137	43
11	Southampton	42	17	8	17	72	67	1.075	42
12	Plymouth Argyle	42	15	12	15	76	73	1.041	42

Rules for classification: 1) Points; 2) Goal average; 3) Goals scored

=== Results by round ===
Round	1	2	3	4	5	6	7	8	9	10	11	12	13	14	15	16	17	18	19	20	21	22	23	24	25	26	27	28	29	30	31	32	33	34	35	36	37	38	39	40	41	42
Ground	H	A	A	H	H	A	A	H	H	A	H	A	A	H	H	A	A	H	A	H	A	H	A	H	A	H	H	A	H	A	H	A	H	A	H	A	A	H	A	H	A	H
Result	D	D	W	L	L	L	L	W	W	W	L	W	L	W	W	W	L	W	W	D	L	D	L	W	L	W	W	D	W	L	L	L	D	L	W	W	L	W	L	D	L	W
Position			10	12	13	14	17	17	14	9	13	10	11	11	11	9	8	9	6	6	7	8	10	8	8	8	9	7	5	7	10	13	12	13	12	10	12	10	10	10	12	10
Points	1	2	4	4	4	4	4	6	8	10	10	12	12	14	16	18	18	20	22	23	23	24	24	26	26	28	30	31	33	33	33	33	34	34	36	38	38	40	40	41	41	43

Source: Competitive matches
A = Away; H = Home; W = Win; D = Draw; L = Loss

== Fixtures and results ==
=== Second Division ===
18 August 1962 1	Cardiff City	4–4	Newcastle United	Cardiff
15:15	Peter Hooper 42'; Mel Charles 49'; Barrie Hole 54', 79'		30' (pen.) Jimmy Fell; 35' Jim Kerray; 43' (o.g.) Frank Rankmore; 71' Dave Hilley	Stadium: Ninian Park; Attendance: 27,569; Referee: Jim Pickles

22 August 1962 2	Norwich City	0–0	Cardiff City	Norwich
				Stadium: Carrow Road; Attendance: 25,360

25 August 1962 3	Derby County	1–2	Cardiff City	Derby
15:00	Jack Bowers		(pen.) Peter Hooper; Ivor Allchurch	Stadium: Baseball Ground; Attendance: 14,538; Referee: WE Haynes

29 August 1962 4	Cardiff City	2–4	Norwich City	Cardiff
19:15	Peter Hooper; Peter Hooper		(?) Jim Oliver (?) Terry Allcock	Stadium: Ninian Park; Attendance: 26,103

1 September 1962 5	Cardiff City	1–2	Middlesbrough	Cardiff
15:15	Dick Neal 78' (o.g.)		30' (pen.), 72' Arthur Kaye	Stadium: Ninian Park; Attendance: 18,940; Referee: LJ Hamer (Bolton)

4 September 1962 6	Swansea Town	2–1	Cardiff City	Swansea
19:15	Herbie Williams 49'; Eddie Thomas 53'		88' Mel Charles	Stadium: Vetch Field; Attendance: 24,687; Referee: Peter Brandwood (Bridgwater)

8 September 1962 7	Huddersfield Town	1–0	Cardiff City	Huddersfield
	Len White			Stadium: Leeds Road; Attendance: 17,573

12 September 1962 8	Cardiff City	5–3	Grimsby Town	Cardiff
19:15	Peter Hooper; Alan McIntosh; Mel Charles; Mel Charles; Ivor Allchurch		(?) Cliff Portwood; Tony Knights	Stadium: Ninian Park; Attendance: 14,426; Referee: Eric Jennings (Stourbridge)

15 September 1962 9	Cardiff City	5–2	Swansea Town	Cardiff
15:15	Peter Davies 4' (o.g.); Mel Charles 10', 20'; Alan McIntosh 48'; Peter Hooper 54'		14', 27' Herbie Williams	Stadium: Ninian Park; Attendance: 23,454; Referee: Jim Finney (Hereford)

18 September 1962 10	Grimsby Town	1–2	Cardiff City	Grimsby
19:15	Brian Hill		Peter Hooper; Peter Hooper	Stadium: Blundell Park; Attendance: 10,962

22 September 1962 11	Cardiff City	1–2	Portsmouth	Cardiff
15:15	Derek Tapscott 7'		89' Tony Barton; 90' Ron Saunders	Stadium: Ninian Park; Attendance: 22,302; Referee: A Atherton (Runcorn)

29 September 1962 12	Preston North End	2–6	Cardiff City	Preston
	John Donnelly 3'; Alex Dawson 44'		14' Derek Tapscott; 35', 75' Peter Hooper; 43', 85' Mel Charles; 70' Alan Durban	Stadium: Deepdale; Attendance: 11,994; Referee: John Thacker (Scarborough)

6 October 1962 13	Chelsea	6–0	Cardiff City	London
15:00	Frank Upton 56'; Terry Venables 58'; Bert Murray 61'; Bobby Tambling 68'; Barry Bridges 69'; Bobby Tambling 79'			Stadium: Stamford Bridge; Attendance: 25,434; Referee: JE Carr (Sheffield)

13 October 1962 14	Cardiff City	1–0	Luton Town	Cardiff
15:15	Peter Hooper 31'	Luton report		Stadium: Ninian Park; Attendance: 15,901; Referee: F Cowen (Manchester)

27 October 1962 15	Cardiff City	4–0	Scunthorpe United	Cardiff
15:15	Alan McIntosh; Ivor Allchurch; Ivor Allchurch; Derek Tapscott			Stadium: Ninian Park; Attendance: 12,003; Referee: Roger Woan (Reading)

31 October 1962 16	Southampton	3–5	Cardiff City	Southampton
	George O'Brien 1', 28', 65'		Barrie Hole; Ivor Allchurch; Ivor Allchurch; Alan McIntosh; Alan Durban	Stadium: The Dell; Attendance: 16,616

3 November 1962 17	Bury	1–0	Cardiff City	Bury
	Bill Calder 28'			Stadium: Gigg Lane; Attendance: 9,915; Referee: Harold Horner (Coventry)

10 November 1962 18	Cardiff City	4–1	Rotherham United	Cardiff
15:15	Alan Durban 21', 80'; Peter Hooper 41', 81'		68' Alan Kirkman	Stadium: Ninian Park; Attendance: 14,199

17 November 1962 19	Charlton Athletic	2–4	Cardiff City	London
	Roy Matthews 4'; Mike Kenning 19'		15', 50', 60' Derek Tapscott; 39' Peter Hooper	Stadium: The Valley; Attendance: 11,509; Referee: Ray Aldous (Ipswich)

24 November 1962 20	Cardiff City	1–1	Stoke City	Cardiff
15:15	Alan McIntosh		Jackie Mudie	Stadium: Ninian Park; Attendance: 21,543; Referee: RJ Mitchell (Prescot)

1 December 1962 21	Sunderland	2–1	Cardiff City	Sunderland
15:00	Jimmy Davison 37'; Brian Clough 52'		60' Ivor Allchurch	Stadium: Roker Park; Attendance: 37,603; Referee: GW Grundy (Grimsby)

8 December 1962 22	Cardiff City	0–0	Leeds United	Cardiff
15:15				Stadium: Ninian Park; Attendance: 11,334; Referee: Bill Clements (West Bromwich)

15 December 1962 23	Newcastle United	2–1	Cardiff City	Newcastle
15:00	Jimmy Fell 85', 86'		13' Peter Hooper	Stadium: St James Park; Attendance: 27,916

22 December 1962 24	Cardiff City	1–0	Derby County	Cardiff
15:15	Peter Hooper			Stadium: Ninian Park; Attendance: 12,027

26 December 1962 25	Plymouth Argyle	4–2	Cardiff City	Plymouth
15:15	Jimmy McAnearney; Jimmy McAnearney; Alex Jackson; Alex Jackson	Plymouth report	Alan Durban; Alan Durban	Stadium: Home Park; Attendance: 18,992; Referee: S Yates (Bristol)

23 February 1963 26	Cardiff City	1–0	Chelsea	Cardiff
15:15	Alan Harrington 63'			Stadium: Ninian Park; Attendance: 16,108; Referee: Harold Richards (Oldham)

9 March 1963 27	Cardiff City	3–1	Southampton	Cardiff
18:45	Ivor Allchurch; Derek Tapscott; Alan McIntosh		George O'Brien	Stadium: Ninian Park; Attendance: 12,427

15 March 1963 28	Scunthorpe United	2–2	Cardiff City	Scunthorpe
	Goal		Ivor Allchurch; Ivor Allchurch	Stadium: Old Show Ground; Attendance: 8,060

23 March 1963 29	Cardiff City	3–1	Bury	Cardiff
15:15	Jack Threlfall 41' (o.g.); Peter Hooper 54'; Mel Charles 83'		38' Tony Bartley	Stadium: Ninian Park; Attendance: 15,565; Referee: JE Cooke (Waterbeach)

29 March 1963 30	Rotherham United	2–1	Cardiff City	Rotherham
19:15	Albert Bennett (?)		Ivor Allchurch	Stadium: Millmoor; Attendance: 9,131; Referee: Frank Cowen (Manchester)

6 April 1963 31	Cardiff City	1–2	Charlton Athletic	Cardiff
15:15	Barrie Hole 83'		10' Cliff Durandt; 16' Mike Bailey	Stadium: Ninian Park; Attendance: 12,619; Referee: Jack Taylor (Wolverhampton)

13 April 1963 32	Stoke City	1–0	Cardiff City	Stoke
	Dennis Viollet			Stadium: Victoria Ground; Attendance: 30,453

15 April 1963 33	Cardiff City	2–2	Walsall	Cardiff
15:15	Trevor Edwards 55'; Derek Tapscott 83'		7' Graham Newton; 90' Ken Hodgkisson	Stadium: Ninian Park; Attendance: 11,257; Referee: Arthur Edge (Liverpool)

16 April 1963 34	Walsall	2–1	Cardiff City	Walsall
	Jimmy O'Neill; Graham Newton		Peter King	Stadium: Fellows Park; Attendance: 10,381; Referee: KR Tuck (Chesterfield)

20 April 1963 35	Cardiff City	5–2	Sunderland	Cardiff
15:15	Derek Tapscott 12'; Peter Hooper 17', 27'; Alan McIntosh 44'; Mel Charles 71'		56' (o.g.) Trevor Edwards; 57' Andy Kerr	Stadium: Ninian Park; Attendance: 12,293; Referee: Peter Brandwood (Wolverhampton)

24 April 1963 36	Luton Town	2–3	Cardiff City	Luton
19:15	Ron Davies 40'; Alan Daniel 60' (pen.)	Luton report	3', 21', 46' Peter Hooper	Stadium: Kenilworth Road; Attendance: 7,237; Referee: Harold Horner (Coventry)

27 April 1963 37	Leeds United	3–0	Cardiff City	Leeds
	Jim Storrie 1', 47', 81'			Stadium: Elland Road; Attendance: 19,702; Referee: Keith Walker (Blackpool)

1 May 1963 38	Cardiff City	2–1	Plymouth Argyle	Cardiff
19:15	Ivor Allchurch; Barrie Hole	Plymouth report	(pen.) Johnny Newman	Stadium: Ninian Park; Attendance: 9,673; Referee: LW Faulkner (Liverpool)

4 May 1963 39	Portsmouth	2–0	Cardiff City	Portsmouth
	Ron Saunders 85'; Harry Harris 88'			Stadium: Fratton Park; Attendance: 10,538; Referee: Tommy Dawes (Norwich)

6 May 1963 40	Cardiff City	1–1	Preston North End	Cardiff
19:15	Mel Charles		Nobby Lawton	Stadium: Ninian Park; Attendance: 8,389; Referee: Ken Burns (Stourbridge)

11 May 1963 41	Middlesbrough	3–2	Cardiff City	Middlesbrough
	Billy Horner; Alan Peacock; Alan Peacock		Alan McIntosh; Alan McIntosh	Stadium: Ayresome Park; Attendance: 9,628

18 May 1963 42	Cardiff City	3–0	Huddersfield Town	Cardiff
15:15	Peter King; Peter King; Derek Tapscott			Stadium: Ninian Park; Attendance: 8,774

=== League Cup ===
26 September 1962 Round 1	Cardiff City	5–1	Reading	Cardiff
19:00	Mel Charles; Derek Tapscott; Alan Durban; Alan Durban; Peter Hooper (pen.)		Ralph Norton	Stadium: Ninian Park; Attendance: 4,136

23 October 1962 Round 2	Bristol Rovers	2–0	Cardiff City	Bristol
19:30	Keith Williams; Harold Jarman			Stadium: Eastville; Attendance: 12,142; Referee: Eric Jennings (Salisbury)

=== FA Cup ===
18 February 1963 Round 3	Charlton Athletic	1–0	Cardiff City	London
19:30	Lenny Glover			Stadium: The Valley; Attendance: 13,448; Referee: PG Brandwood (Wolverhampton)

=== Welsh Cup ===
26 March 1963 Round 5	Cardiff City	7–1	Abergavenny Thursdays	Cardiff
19:15	Ivor Allchurch; Ivor Allchurch; Alan Durban; Alan Durban; Barrie Hole; Peter Hooper; Derek Tapscott		Goal	Stadium: Ninian Park; Attendance: 2,200

11 April 1963 Round 6	Swansea Town	2–0	Cardiff City	Swansea
19:15	Barrie Jones; Eddie Thomas			Stadium: Vetch Field; Attendance: 11,500; Referee: Leo Callaghan (Merthyr Tydfil)

== See also ==
- Cardiff City F.C. seasons
