= Wales national football team results (1960–1979) =

The Wales national football team represents Wales in international association football and is governed by the Football Association of Wales (FAW). Between 1960 and 1979 the side played 118 matches, the majority of which came against the other national teams of the Home Nations in the British Home Championship. Their first match of the period was a 3–2 victory over Northern Ireland which secured a shared Home Championship title as Wales, England and Scotland each finished with four points.

Having reached the quarter-finals of the 1958 FIFA World Cup, Wales suffered defeat in the qualifying stages for the 1962 tournament. As the team also failed to qualify for the 1966 FIFA World Cup they instead undertook tours to South America in both summers, playing several matches against Brazil and other sides. Wales also entered the 1964 European Nations' Cup, after not taking part in the inaugural competition four years earlier, but were eliminated in the first qualifying round by Hungary. The decade ended at a low point as Wales failed to gain a single point in qualifying for the 1970 FIFA World Cup and finished bottom of the last British Home Championship of the decade.

Wales reached the quarter-finals of the 1976 European Championships, (Note: For the 1976 tournament, the quarter-finals were played as a two-legged, home and away tie with the final tournament hosting only the semi-finals and beyond.) but suffered defeat in a two-legged tie against Yugoslavia. The second leg at Ninian Park proved controversial over refereeing decisions while crowd trouble led Wales to receive sanctions on home venues from FIFA. In 1978, Wales recorded the second biggest margin of victory in their history by defeating Malta 7–0, with Ian Edwards scoring four times on his debut.

Of the 118 matches, Wales played during this period, they won 32. They were most successful against Northern Ireland, winning 10 of 20 meetings between the two sides. They also defeated Scotland three times and recorded two victories over four other sides. Wales were least successful against England, winning only once in 22 meetings and losing 14.

== Results ==
Wales' score is shown first in each case. The colours listed below are also used to signify results combined with the scoreline.

Key
Colour (with score)	Meaning
	Defeat
	Draw
	Win

Wales national football team results 1960–1979 (Note: Table information sourced from the references listed in the statistics section below.)
Match no.	Date	Venue	H/A	Opponents	Score	Competition	Wales scorers	Att.
234	6 April 1960	Racecourse Ground, Wrexham	H	Northern Ireland	3–2	1959–60 British Home Championship	Terry Medwin (2), Cliff Jones	16,979
235	28 September 1960	Dalymount Park, Dublin	A	Republic of Ireland	3–2	Friendly	Cliff Jones (2), Phil Woosnam	20,000
236	22 October 1960	Ninian Park, Cardiff	H	Scotland	2–0	1960–61 British Home Championship	Cliff Jones, Roy Vernon	55,000
237	23 November 1960	Wembley Stadium, London	A	England	1–5	1960–61 British Home Championship	Ken Leek	65,000
238	12 April 1961	Windsor Park, Belfast	A	Northern Ireland	5–1	1960–61 British Home Championship	Cliff Jones (2), Mel Charles, Ivor Allchurch, Ken Leek	30,000
239	19 April 1961	Ninian Park, Cardiff	H	Spain	1–2	1962 FIFA World Cup Qualification	Phil Woosnam	45,000
240	18 May 1961	Santiago Bernabéu, Madrid	A	Spain	1–1	1962 FIFA World Cup Qualification	Ivor Allchurch	65,466
241	28 May 1961	Népstadion, Budapest	A	Hungary	2–3	Friendly	Cliff Jones, Ivor Allchurch	40,000
242	14 October 1961	Ninian Park, Cardiff	H	England	1–1	1961–62 British Home Championship	Graham Williams	61,556
243	8 November 1961	Hampden Park, Glasgow	A	Scotland	0–2	1961–62 British Home Championship		74,329
244	11 April 1962	Ninian Park, Cardiff	H	Northern Ireland	4–0	1961–62 British Home Championship	Mel Charles (4)	13,250
245	12 May 1962	Estádio do Maracanã, Rio de Janeiro	A	Brazil	1–3	Friendly	Ivor Allchurch	83,112
246	16 May 1962	Estádio do Morumbi, São Paulo	A	Brazil	1–3	Friendly	Ken Leek	30,710
247	22 May 1962	Estadio Azul, Mexico City	A	Mexico	1–2	Friendly	John Charles	75,000
248	20 October 1962	Ninian Park, Cardiff	H	Scotland	2–3	1962–63 British Home Championship	Ivor Allchurch, John Charles	50,000
249	7 November 1962	Népstadion, Budapest	A	Hungary	1–3	UEFA Euro 1964 qualifying	Terry Medwin	40,000
250	21 November 1962	Wembley Stadium, London	A	England	0–4	1962–63 British Home Championship		27,500
251	20 March 1963	Ninian Park, Cardiff	H	Hungary	1–1	UEFA Euro 1964 qualifying	Cliff Jones	30,413
252	3 April 1963	Windsor Park, Belfast	A	Northern Ireland	4–1	1962–63 British Home Championship	Cliff Jones (3), Phil Woosnam	25,000
253	12 October 1963	Ninian Park, Cardiff	H	England	0–4	1963–64 British Home Championship		48,350
254	20 November 1963	Hampden Park, Glasgow	A	Scotland	1–2	1963–64 British Home Championship	Barrie Jones	56,067
255	15 April 1964	Vetch Field, Swansea	H	Northern Ireland	2–3	1963–64 British Home Championship	Brian Godfrey, Wyn Davies	10,434
256	3 October 1964	Ninian Park, Cardiff	H	Scotland	3–2	1964–65 British Home Championship	Ken Leek (2), Wyn Davies	37,093
257	21 October 1964	Idrætsparken, Copenhagen	A	Denmark	0–1	1966 FIFA World Cup Qualification		22,473
258	18 November 1964	Wembley Stadium, London	A	England	1–2	1964–65 British Home Championship	Cliff Jones	40,000
259	9 December 1964	Leoforos Alexandras Stadium, Athens	A	Greece	0–2	1966 FIFA World Cup Qualification		20,663
260	17 March 1965	Ninian Park, Cardiff	H	Greece	4–1	1966 FIFA World Cup Qualification	Ivor Allchurch (2), Mike England, Roy Vernon	11,159
261	31 March 1965	Windsor Park, Belfast	A	Northern Ireland	5–0	1964–65 British Home Championship	Roy Vernon (2), Cliff Jones, Graham Williams, Ivor Allchurch	15,000
262	1 May 1965	Stadio Artemio Franchi, Florence	A	Italy	1–4	Friendly	Brian Godfrey	43,000
263	30 May 1965	Central Lenin Stadium, Moscow	A	Soviet Union	1–2	1966 FIFA World Cup Qualification	Ron Davies	86,015
264	2 October 1965	Ninian Park, Cardiff	H	England	0–0	1965–66 British Home Championship		30,000
265	27 October 1965	Ninian Park, Cardiff	H	Soviet Union	2–1	1966 FIFA World Cup Qualification	Roy Vernon, Ivor Allchurch	24,262
266	24 November 1965	Hampden Park, Glasgow	A	Scotland	1–4	1965–66 British Home Championship	Ivor Allchurch	49,888
267	1 December 1965	Racecourse Ground, Wrexham	H	Denmark	4–2	1966 FIFA World Cup Qualification	Roy Vernon (2), Wyn Davies, Ronnie Rees	4,839
268	30 March 1966	Ninian Park, Cardiff	H	Northern Ireland	1–4	1965–66 British Home Championship	Wyn Davies	12,860
269	14 May 1966	Estádio do Maracanã, Rio de Janeiro	A	Brazil	1–3	Friendly	Ron Davies	64,620
270	18 May 1966	Mineirão, Belo Horizonte	A	Brazil	0–1	Friendly		25,231
271	22 May 1966	Estadio Nacional, Santiago	A	Chile	0–2	Friendly		54,000
272	22 October 1966	Ninian Park, Cardiff	H	Scotland	1–1	1966–67 British Home Championship (Note: The 1966–67 and 1967-68 British Home Championships were used to determine which of the Home Nations would qualify for the 1968 UEFA European Championships.)	Ron Davies	33,269
273	16 November 1966	Wembley Stadium, London	A	England	1–5	1966–67 British Home Championship	Wyn Davies	75,380
274	12 April 1967	Windsor Park, Belfast	A	Northern Ireland	0–0	1966–67 British Home Championship		17,770
275	21 October 1967	Ninian Park, Cardiff	H	England	0–3	1967–68 British Home Championship		44,960
276	22 November 1967	Hampden Park, Glasgow	A	Scotland	2–3	1967–68 British Home Championship	Ron Davies, Alan Durban	57,472
277	28 February 1968	Racecourse Ground, Wrexham	H	Northern Ireland	2–0	1967–68 British Home Championship	Ronnie Rees, Wyn Davies	17,548
278	8 May 1968	Ninian Park, Cardiff	H	West Germany	1–1	Friendly	Wyn Davies	8,075
279	23 October 1968	Ninian Park, Cardiff	H	Italy	0–1	1970 FIFA World Cup Qualification		18,558
280	26 March 1969	Waldstadion, Frankfurt	A	West Germany	1–1	Friendly	Barrie Jones	40,000
281	16 April 1969	Heinz-Steyer-Stadion, Dresden	A	East Germany	1–2	1970 FIFA World Cup Qualification	John Toshack	38,198
282	3 May 1969	Racecourse Ground, Wrexham	H	Scotland	3–5	1968–69 British Home Championship	Ron Davies (2), John Toshack	18,765
283	7 May 1969	Wembley Stadium, London	A	England	1–2	1968–69 British Home Championship	Ron Davies	70,000
284	10 May 1969	Windsor Park, Belfast	A	Northern Ireland	0–0	1968–69 British Home Championship		12,500
285	22 October 1969	Ninian Park, Cardiff	H	East Germany	1–3	1970 FIFA World Cup Qualification	Dave Powell	22,409
286	4 November 1969	Stadio Olimpico, Rome	A	Italy	1–4	1970 FIFA World Cup Qualification	Mike England	67,481
287	18 April 1970	Ninian Park, Cardiff	H	England	1–1	1969–70 British Home Championship	Dick Krzywicki	40,126
288	22 April 1970	Hampden Park, Glasgow	A	Scotland	0–0	1969–70 British Home Championship		30,434
289	25 April 1970	Vetch Field, Swansea	H	Northern Ireland	1–0	1969–70 British Home Championship	Ronnie Rees	27,067
290	11 November 1970	Ninian Park, Cardiff	H	Romania	0–0	UEFA Euro 1972 qualifying		19,882
291	21 April 1971	Vetch Field, Swansea	H	Czechoslovakia	1–3	UEFA Euro 1972 qualifying	Ron Davies	12,767
292	15 May 1971	Ninian Park, Cardiff	H	Scotland	0–0	1970–71 British Home Championship		19,068
293	19 May 1971	Wembley Stadium, London	A	England	0–0	1970–71 British Home Championship		70,000
294	22 May 1971	Windsor Park, Belfast	A	Northern Ireland	0–1	1970–71 British Home Championship		23,000
295	26 May 1971	Olympiastadion, Helsinki	A	Finland	1–0	UEFA Euro 1972 qualifying	John Toshack	5,410
296	13 October 1971	Vetch Field, Swansea	H	Finland	3–0	UEFA Euro 1972 qualifying	Alan Durban, John Toshack, Gil Reece	10,301
297	27 October 1971	Letenský stadion, Prague	A	Czechoslovakia	0–1	UEFA Euro 1972 qualifying		20,051
298	24 November 1971	Stadionul 23. August, Bucharest	A	Romania	0–2	UEFA Euro 1972 qualifying		35,251
299	20 May 1972	Ninian Park, Cardiff	H	England	0–3	1971–72 British Home Championship		34,000
300	24 May 1972	Hampden Park, Glasgow	A	Scotland	0–1	1971–72 British Home Championship		21,332
301	27 May 1972	Racecourse Ground, Wrexham	H	Northern Ireland	0–0	1971–72 British Home Championship		15,647
302	15 November 1972	Ninian Park, Cardiff	H	England	0–1	1974 FIFA World Cup Qualification		36,384
303	24 January 1973	Wembley Stadium, London	A	England	1–1	1974 FIFA World Cup Qualification	John Toshack	62,273
304	28 March 1973	Ninian Park, Cardiff	H	Poland	2–0	1974 FIFA World Cup Qualification	Leighton James, Trevor Hockey	12,753
305	12 May 1973	Racecourse Ground, Wrexham	H	Scotland	0–2	1972–73 British Home Championship		18,682
306	15 May 1973	Wembley Stadium, London	A	England	0–3	1972–73 British Home Championship		38,000
307	19 May 1973	Goodison Park, Liverpool	N	Northern Ireland	0–1	1972–73 British Home Championship		4,946
308	26 September 1973	Stadion Śląski, Chorzów	A	Poland	0–3	1974 FIFA World Cup Qualification		70,181
309	11 May 1974	Ninian Park, Cardiff	H	England	0–2	1973–74 British Home Championship		25,734
310	14 May 1974	Hampden Park, Glasgow	A	Scotland	0–2	1973–74 British Home Championship		41,969
311	18 May 1974	Racecourse Ground, Wrexham	H	Northern Ireland	1–0	1973–74 British Home Championship	David Smallman	9,311
312	4 September 1974	Praterstadion, Vienna	A	Austria	1–2	UEFA Euro 1976 qualifying	Arfon Griffiths	30,795
313	30 October 1974	Ninian Park, Cardiff	H	Hungary	2–0	UEFA Euro 1976 qualifying	Arfon Griffiths, John Toshack	8,445
314	20 November 1974	Vetch Field, Swansea	H	Luxembourg	5–0	UEFA Euro 1976 qualifying	John Toshack, Mike England, Phil Roberts, Arfon Griffiths, Terry Yorath	10,539
315	16 April 1975	Népstadion, Budapest	A	Hungary	2–1	UEFA Euro 1976 qualifying	John Toshack, John Mahoney	21,080
316	1 May 1975	Stade Municipal, Luxembourg	A	Luxembourg	3–1	UEFA Euro 1976 qualifying	Leighton James (2), Gil Reece	3,289
317	17 May 1975	Ninian Park, Cardiff	H	Scotland	2–2	1974–75 British Home Championship	John Toshack, Brian Flynn	23,509
318	21 May 1975	Wembley Stadium, London	A	England	2–2	1974–75 British Home Championship	John Toshack, Arfon Griffiths	53,000
319	23 May 1975	Windsor Park, Belfast	A	Northern Ireland	0–1	1974–75 British Home Championship		17,000
320	19 November 1975	Racecourse Ground, Wrexham	H	Austria	1–0	UEFA Euro 1976 qualifying	Arfon Griffiths	27,578
321	24 March 1976	Racecourse Ground, Wrexham	H	England	1–2	Friendly	Alan Curtis	20,927
322	24 April 1976	Stadion Dinamo, Zagreb	A	Yugoslavia	0–2	UEFA Euro 1976 qualifying		36,917
323	6 May 1976	Hampden Park, Glasgow	A	Scotland	1–3	1975–76 British Home Championship	Arfon Griffiths	25,466
324	8 May 1976	Ninian Park, Cardiff	H	England	0–1	1975–76 British Home Championship		24,592
325	14 May 1976	Vetch Field, Swansea	H	Northern Ireland	1–0	1975–76 British Home Championship	Leighton James	9,935
326	22 May 1976	Ninian Park, Cardiff	H	Yugoslavia	1–1	UEFA Euro 1976 qualifying	Ian Evans	30,346
327	6 October 1976	Ninian Park, Cardiff	H	West Germany	0–2	Friendly		14,029
328	17 November 1976	Hampden Park, Glasgow	A	Scotland	0–1	1978 FIFA World Cup Qualification		63,233
329	30 March 1977	Racecourse Ground, Wrexham	H	Czechoslovakia	3–0	1978 FIFA World Cup Qualification	Leighton James (2), Nick Deacy	18,022
330	28 May 1977	Racecourse Ground, Wrexham	H	Scotland	0–0	1976–77 British Home Championship		14,469
331	31 May 1977	Wembley Stadium, London	A	England	1–0	1976–77 British Home Championship	Leighton James	48,000
332	3 June 1977	Windsor Park, Belfast	A	Northern Ireland	1–1	1976–77 British Home Championship	Nick Deacy	15,000
333	6 September 1977	Racecourse Ground, Wrexham	H	Kuwait	0–0	Friendly		3,132
334	20 September 1977	Kuwait National Stadium, Kuwait City	A	Kuwait	0–0	Friendly		6,000
335	12 October 1977	Anfield, Liverpool (Note: The match was held in Liverpool after sanctions against the Welsh team following crowd trouble in the match against Yugoslavia the previous year.)	H	Scotland	0–2	1978 FIFA World Cup Qualification		50,850
336	16 November 1977	Letenský stadion, Prague	A	Czechoslovakia	0–1	1978 FIFA World Cup Qualification		22,383
337	14 December 1977	Westfalenstadion, Dortmund	A	West Germany	1–1	Friendly	Dave Jones	53,800
338	18 April 1978	Sad-Hezar Nafari Stadium, Tehran	A	Iran	1–0	Friendly		50,000
339	13 May 1978	Ninian Park, Cardiff	H	England	1–3	1977–78 British Home Championship	Phil Dwyer	17,698
340	17 May 1978	Hampden Park, Glasgow	A	Scotland	1–1	1977–78 British Home Championship	Willie Donachie (o.g.)	70,241
341	19 May 1978	Racecourse Ground, Wrexham	H	Northern Ireland	1–0	1977–78 British Home Championship	Nick Deacy	9,077
342	25 October 1978	Racecourse Ground, Wrexham	H	Malta	7–0	UEFA Euro 1980 qualifying	Ian Edwards (4), Peter O'Sullivan, Mickey Thomas, Brian Flynn	11,475
343	29 November 1978	Racecourse Ground, Wrexham	H	Turkey	1–0	UEFA Euro 1980 qualifying	Nick Deacy	11,794
344	2 May 1979	Racecourse Ground, Wrexham	H	West Germany	0–2	UEFA Euro 1980 qualifying		26,900
345	19 May 1979	Ninian Park, Cardiff	H	Scotland	3–0	1978–79 British Home Championship	John Toshack (3)	20,371
346	23 May 1979	Wembley Stadium, London	A	England	0–0	1978–79 British Home Championship		70,220
347	25 May 1979	Windsor Park, Belfast	A	Northern Ireland	1–1	1978–79 British Home Championship	Robbie James	6,500
348	2 June 1979	Empire Stadium, Gżira	A	Malta	2–0	UEFA Euro 1980 qualifying	Peter Nicholas, Brian Flynn	8,358
349	11 September 1979	Vetch Field, Swansea	H	Republic of Ireland	2–1	Friendly	Ian Walsh, Alan Curtis	6,825
350	17 October 1979	Müngersdorfer Stadion, Cologne	A	West Germany	1–5	UEFA Euro 1980 qualifying	Alan Curtis	61,400
351	21 November 1979	Alsancak Stadium, Izmir	A	Turkey	0–1	UEFA Euro 1980 qualifying		30,650

== Head to head records ==
Head to head records
Opponent	P	W	D	L	GF	GA	W%	D%	L%
Austria	2	1	0	1	2	2	50	0	50
Brazil	4	0	0	4	3	10	0	0	100
Chile	1	0	0	1	0	2	0	0	100
Czechoslovakia	4	1	0	3	4	5	25	0	75
Denmark	2	1	0	1	1	2	50	0	50
East Germany	2	0	0	2	2	5	0	0	100
England	22	1	7	14	12	45	5	32	64
Finland	2	2	0	0	4	0	100	0	0
Greece	2	1	0	1	4	3	50	0	50
Hungary	5	2	1	2	8	8	40	20	40
Iran	1	1	0	0	1	0	100	0	0
Italy	3	0	0	3	2	9	0	0	100
Kuwait	2	0	2	0	0	0	0	100	0
Luxembourg	2	2	0	0	8	1	100	0	0
Malta	2	2	0	0	9	0	100	0	0
Mexico	1	0	0	1	1	2	0	0	100
Northern Ireland	20	10	5	5	32	16	50	25	25
Poland	2	1	0	1	2	3	50	0	50
Republic of Ireland	2	2	0	0	5	3	100	0	0
Romania	2	0	1	1	0	2	0	50	50
Scotland	21	3	6	12	22	36	14	29	57
Soviet Union	2	1	0	1	3	2	50	0	50
Spain	2	0	1	1	2	3	0	50	50
Turkey	2	1	0	1	1	1	50	0	50
West Germany	6	0	3	3	4	12	0	50	50
Yugoslavia	2	0	1	1	1	3	0	50	50
Totals	118	32	27	59	133	175	27	23	50
