= Mel Charles =

Welsh footballer

Personal information
- Full name: Melvyn Charles
- Date of birth: 14 May 1935
- Place of birth: Swansea, Wales
- Date of death: 24 September 2016 (aged 81)
- Positions: Centre-half; right-half; centre-forward

Youth career
- Leeds United
- Swansea Town

Senior career*
Years	Team	Apps	(Gls)
1952–1959	Swansea Town	233	(66)
1959–1962	Arsenal	60	(26)
1962–1965	Cardiff City	79	(25)
1965–1966	Porthmadog		
1966–1967	Port Vale	7	(0)
1967	Oswestry Town		
1967–1972	Haverfordwest		
Total		379	(117)

International career
1958	Wales U23	1	(0)
1955–1962	Wales	31	(6)
- * Club domestic league appearances and goals

Melvyn Charles (14 May 1935 – 24 September 2016) was a Welsh international footballer. Charles played as both a centre-half and centre-forward, with his preferred position being at right-half.

After a short stint on the Leeds United ground staff, he turned professional with his local club, Swansea Town, in 1952. He spent seven years in the Second Division with the club before he won a £42,750 move to First Division Arsenal in March 1959. His three seasons at the club were plagued by injury, and in February 1962, he was sold to Cardiff City for a £28,500 fee. He spent three years with Cardiff, winning the Welsh Cup in 1964, his only domestic honour before he joined Porthmadog in the Welsh League in 1965. He spent a brief period in the Fourth Division with Port Vale in the 1966–67 season before he returned to Welsh football with Oswestry Town. He joined Haverfordwest in 1967, where he spent five years before he retired from the game. He scored 122 goals in 401 league and cup games in the Football League.

He captained Wales at the international level, whom he represented at the 1958 FIFA World Cup. Charles also went his whole career without being booked or sent off. He also competed in eight British Home Championships and became only the third Welshman to score four goals in a game when he scored all the goals in a 4–0 win over Northern Ireland. In total, he earned 31 senior caps, in addition to one under-23 cap, and he scored six full international goals.

== Club career ==
=== Swansea City ===
Growing up in a poor family in the Cwmbwrla district of Swansea alongside elder brother John and three other siblings, the brothers grew up on Alice Street in Swansea, being neighbours of fellow future Welsh internationals Ernie Jones, Mel Nurse, and Jackie Roberts.

John and Mel Charles seemed destined to begin their careers at local club Swansea Town. However, manager Billy McCandless was unwilling to test youngsters in the unforgiving waters of the Third Division South, so the boys were not signed up to the club. This proved costly to Swansea, and the result was that John signed with Leeds United, and 14-year-old Mel also followed him to Elland Road to become one of the ground staff. Despite fitting in well at the club, he was unable to settle in Leeds; due to his poor background he was unable to afford trips back to Wales to visit his family and he was also illiterate so could not write home. After a young apprentice, also from Swansea, failed to impress at Leeds, manager Major Frank Buckley asked Charles to accompany him on the trip back to his hometown. However, due to his homesickness, Charles never returned to Yorkshire once he made it back to Swansea. Instead, Swansea Town scout Joe Sykes persuaded Charles to join the club's ground staff.

He was offered a professional contract with Swansea Town at the age of 17, and he immediately settled into the Second Division side. His debut came at Bramall Lane on 20 December 1952, in what turned out to be a 7–1 defeat to Sheffield United. However, his progress was halted when he twisted his knee on national service, though this injury came as he was messing around outside the cook house rather than on parade or in the 9th Battalion's march to the Army Cup. He went straight back into the first team upon his recovery. He played mostly at centre-half or in his preferred position at right-half. He remained in the first XI under Ron Burgess, who was appointed manager following McCandless' death in July 1955.

He spent seven seasons with the "Swans" from 1952 to 1959, all ending with Swansea finishing between tenth and twentieth. They consistently picked up results at Vetch Field but failed to perform away from home. During this time they also reached the final of the Welsh Cup in 1956 and 1957, though lost out to Cardiff City and then Wrexham. A cash-strapped club, their cause was not helped by the fact that the directors refused to pay for overnight stays, and so many times the team's coach would appear outside the opposition's ground just minutes before the match. Swansea were a selling a club, and during his time Ivor and Len Allchurch, Cliff Jones, and Terry Medwin would all be sold to big English clubs. Including Charles, these five players all represented Wales at the World Cup. Jones' brother Bryn also played for Swansea, as did Cyril and Gilbert Beech; this meant three sets of brothers played for the "Swans" during this time, in what was an extremely local squad. Throughout the 1950s, Swansea were an attacking team. During his time at Vetch Field, Charles picked up four goals in a match against Blackburn Rovers, as well as hat-tricks against Stoke City, Middlesbrough and Sheffield Wednesday. Charles offered to work at a second job to remain at Swansea with their strict wage limit of £14 a week, but this was not permitted, and instead, he put in a transfer request. He employed Neil Harris to act as his 'business manager' in his pending transfer move, thereby making him the first-ever agent in the English game. In one of his last games for the club, he helped Swansea record their first ever league win over rivals Cardiff City at Ninian Park.

=== Arsenal ===
Chased by Chelsea and Tottenham Hotspur, Charles was eventually sold to Arsenal in March 1959 for a fee of £42,750 with two other players, David Dodson and Peter Davies, going the other way. This was, at the time, the highest-ever transfer between two British clubs as Juventus had paid Leeds United £65,000 for John Charles in 1957. Aiming to use him as a centre forward, Arsenal manager George Swindin and captain Tommy Docherty managed to persuade Charles to take the move, and as the Arsenal men convinced Charles, Tottenham decided to withdraw their offer. Spurs manager Bill Nicholson was forced to sign Dave Mackay instead, as the White Hart Lane club would become a major force in the game in the 1960s. Due to this success, in his autobiography, Charles wrote that "signing for Arsenal was the most terrible choice I ever made". Though he also wrote that "I'll always have a place in my heart for Arsenal, and it was an honour to have played for them."

He was paid £20 a week and set up with a house and car by the Arsenal management – a Sunbeam-Talbot with the license plate 'MEL 9'. Not used to the complexities of a rapidly modernising game, he endured a frosty relationship with coach Ron Greenwood after numerous humorous mix-ups over new terms such as 'blind-side run' and 'marking space', and embarrassed himself in front of the TV cameras when he fumbled and said "I'm okay, I've just got clitorises in my eyes", instead of cataracts.

He made his debut against Sheffield Wednesday on 22 August 1959, in what was a difficult 1959–60 season for the "Gunners". Though they ended up in 13th place, Charles managed to bag himself a hat-trick at Highbury in a 5–2 win over Blackburn Rovers on 6 February. A fortnight later he missed a chance to make it two Highbury hat-tricks in a row when, already with two goals to his name, he scuffed a penalty into the arms of Everton keeper Jimmy O'Neill.

Always struggling with his knees, during the 1960–61 he started to be afflicted by ligament damage. The physios used whatever methods they could to reduce the swellings in his knees, and as he was a big-money signing, Charles would be forced to take to the field week in and week out, despite his injuries. His team were wildly inconsistent, beating Newcastle United 5–0, only to lose 6–0 to West Ham United a few weeks later; meanwhile supporters were anxious at the rise of their North London rivals. Arsenal finished eleventh, some 25 points behind Double-winning Tottenham Hotspur.

The 1961–62 season was another difficult one for Charles and Arsenal. However, he did manage to bag another hat-trick for the club, as he scored all three goals in an FA Cup win over Bradford City. His time in London would be dominated by injuries, though, and he underwent three operations in three years. Altogether, Charles played 64 matches in three seasons for Arsenal, scoring 28 goals.

=== Cardiff City ===
In February 1962, he returned to his native Wales to sign with Cardiff City, who paid Arsenal £28,500 for his services. Though he would have preferred a move back to Swansea, they were unwilling to spend money in the transfer market, and so he was happy to sign with Cardiff, despite the Cardiff-Swansea rivalry; in turn the Cardiff fans were welcoming to Charles despite his Swansea connection. The "Bluebirds" were in a relegation dogfight, and there was a lot of pressure on Charles to perform, however, he missed an easy chance for a goal in his debut, in what ended as a 0–0 draw at home to Manchester City. He helped them to earn 1–1 draws against Burnley and former club Arsenal, however, a bad run soon followed and the club lost their First Division status at the end of the season.

Cardiff signed renowned goal-getters Ivor Allchurch and Peter Hooper for the upcoming 1962–63 Second Division campaign. So Charles was moved to a more central role in the pitch. Though signed by Bill Jones, ironically George Swindin, the manager who had sold him at Arsenal, replaced Jones as manager in October 1962. Despite the disruption, Charles scored in both derby games against Swansea in what was otherwise a forgettable season for Cardiff fans.

Cardiff signed John Charles for the start of the 1963–64 campaign, allowing the brothers to play alongside each other for the first time at club level. However, Swindin was against the move, as his team were already quite old without the 32-year-old former superstar; instead, it was the club's chairman who pushed for the £22,500 deal. On his league debut for Cardiff, against Norwich City, John scored from a free kick inside his own half. However, Mel picked up an injury, and Cardiff's promotion hopes began to fade after a poor run of form in the Christmas period. The season did end on a high note, though, as both brothers played in the Welsh Cup final victory over Bangor City. The two-legged affair had finished as a draw, and so Cardiff only lifted the cup after a 2–0 win at the Racecourse Ground, in a hastily arranged replay.

Swindin was sacked for failing to bring promotion, and the new manager Jimmy Scoular did not see eye-to-eye with Charles. Charles scored a hat-trick against Swindon Town but was dropped by Scoular for the next game after he told his striker that he hadn't worked hard enough for the team. Charles responded by pointing at a horse in a field by Ninian Park and telling Scoular, "you could put a number eight shirt on him and he would run all day – but he wouldn't score a fucking hat-trick for you!" Scoular responded to this outburst by telling Charles that he had played his last game for Cardiff and could look for a new club.

=== Later career ===
Charles' next club would be Welsh Football League side Porthmadog. Despite being a little known club, the club was bankrolled by a millionaire, and so Charles was paid a higher wage than he had received at Arsenal and Cardiff. They finished the 1965–66 season second in the Welsh League, behind Caernarfon Town. Despite enjoying his time in North Wales, he decided that he could not turn down an offer to return to the Football League by Port Vale, then managed by Stanley Matthews. Port Vale paid Porthmadog a £1,250 fee, and Charles made his Vale debut in a 1–0 defeat at local rivals Crewe Alexandra on 3 February 1967. He played a further six games, including a rough encounter with Walsall, another one of Vale's rivals, before he decided to head back to Wales.

"Coming out of the Welsh League and playing the Fourth Division was bloody rough. There were some hard bastards in that league and they knocked me about a bit... although Port Vale wanted me to stay on I had had enough... getting used as a punchbag in the Fourth Division didn't really appeal to me at that stage on my career.

— Charles reflects on his time at Vale Park in his autobiography.

Charles signed on a free transfer to Oswestry Town in May 1967 before moving on to Haverfordwest County later in the year; both clubs competed in the Welsh Football League. He enjoyed his time in Pembrokeshire and went on to play close to 200 games for County, mostly as a centre-half. He left the club in 1972 to return to the Cwmbwrla district of Swansea, where he set up an amateur side called Cwmfelin. After he retired from competitive football he had kneecap replacements in both his legs.

== International career ==
Charles made his debut for Wales in a game against Northern Ireland at Windsor Park on 20 April 1955; the Welsh won 3–2 thanks to a John Charles hat-trick. His second cap came against Austria on 23 November, in a game latter dubbed the 'Battle of Wrexham'. He was stretchered off with 15 minutes to go after an Austrian boot went through the back of his leg; this was notable as the only time John ever lost his temper, as he reacted to the challenge by lifting the Austrian off the ground and screaming "If you ever do that to my brother again I'll bloody kill you!" Charles was then selected for the 1957 British Home Championship squad, and helped his country to record a 2–2 draw with Scotland at Ninian Park. He also battled against injury to play in the 3–1 defeat to England at Wembley Stadium, before the tournament ended with a goalless draw in Ireland.

He helped Wales to qualify for the 1958 FIFA World Cup in Sweden after they were drawn in a difficult qualifying group consisting of themselves, Czechoslovakia, and East Germany. A Roy Vernon goal gave Wales two opening points at home to the Czechs – this was John Charles' final game before his big-money move to Juventus. In the second game, Mel gave Wales an opening lead against the East Germans, only for the Germans to come back to record a 2–1 win in front of 100,000 supporters at the Zentralstadion. The return fixture to the Czechs at Prague ended with a 2–0 defeat, seemingly ending Welsh hopes of qualification. Juventus did not allow John to play in the final match, but Mel put in one of his best performances in a Welsh shirt and managed to keep prolific striker Willy Tröger in check to help secure a 4–1 victory over East Germany at Cardiff.

The Czechs won the group and Welsh hopes of World Cup football seemed to be over, however, tension in the Middle East came to Wales' rescue. Before this, the English recorded a thumping 4–0 win at Ninian Park in the 1958 British Home Championship to further depress the Welsh. The reprieve for Wales came as Turkey (now a member of UEFA) refused to compete in the AFC (Asian) qualifying group, and so Israel advanced to the second round of CAF / AFC qualifying by default. Egypt and Indonesia both withdrew from the process, whilst Sudan, then the only other team from the region who had entered, refused to recognise Israel, and so also withdrew from the competition. FIFA ruled that Israel could not qualify for the World Cup without kicking a ball, so a lottery was held for another team to play Israel in a specially created play-off qualification match. Another nation won the lottery, but refused to play as they were too proud to accept such an easy route to the tournament; the Welsh FA had no such qualms, and so Charles and his countrymen only had to overcome a team of amateur Israelis to qualify for the elite competition of international football. Wales duly qualified with two simple 2–0 victories, one in the baking sun at a half completed Ramat Gan Stadium, the other in front of 50,000 rain-soaked Welshmen at Ninian Park; the scores were kept respectable by some heroic goalkeeping from Ya'akov Hodorov.

Wales' maiden appearance in the tournament, it was also the only time all four of the Home Nations qualified for the same World Cup, though only Wales and Northern Ireland made it past the group stage. The Welsh FA were pessimistic about their prospects, and before the tournament, they arranged for five days of training on some free land at Hyde Park and booked the flights home for before the beginning of the knockout stages. Manager Jimmy Murphy used highly defensive tactics, they would prove highly effective as Wales never conceded more than once in any of their five games in the tournament. Wales remained undefeated in the group stage, battling to draws with Hungary, Mexico, and eventual runners-up Sweden. Wales had played well against the Hungarians but played poorly against the Mexicans, though they still came close to recording two victories; in the third match, both the Swedes and the Welsh were happy to amble to a draw, as that way both sides remained in the competition. As Hungary also recorded three points in the group, a play-off match ensued, and Wales came from behind at the Råsunda Stadium to advance with a 2–1 win; however, due to dirty play from the opposition John Charles was injured in the match and missed out on the rest of the tournament. The Welsh were eventually knocked out by Brazil in the quarter-finals at the Ullevi stadium in Gothenburg, thanks to a goal by Pelé in the 66th minute – this was only Pelé's second game for his country. The goal made him the youngest player ever to score in a World Cup game. Charles later recalled that Pelé miskicked the ball, and even in later life it upset him greatly to remember the ball trickling across the line. Pelé himself said that Charles was the best centre-half of the tournament, and the Brazilian swapped shirts with Charles after the game. The Brazilians went on to win the competition. It was a difficult experience for Wales, who were forced to play five highly competitive games in eleven days. Despite their heroics, the competition received little publicity in Britain at the time – the South Wales Evening Post's back page headlined a Glamorgan cricket match – and Charles said in his autobiography that "I don't think many people in Wales even knew the World Cup was on."

After the World Cup, he played in a 3–0 Home Championship defeat to Scotland. On 26 November 1958, he helped the Welsh to record a 2–2 draw with England at Villa Park by marking Nat Lofthouse out of the game. He would play for Wales a further eleven times, and only two of these games finished as Welsh victories, both against Northern Ireland. The second of these, at Ninian Park on 11 April 1962 for the 1962 British Home Championship, finished 4–0, and Charles scored all four goals. This made him one of only four players ever to score four goals in one game for Wales, the other three being John Price (1882), Jack Doughty (1888), and Ian Edwards (1978). Following this, he was included in the tour of South America in 1962, where defeats were recorded by Brazil and Mexico, both of whom were warming up for the 1962 FIFA World Cup – Brazil would go on to beat Czechoslovakia in the final. Wales had missed out on the tournament after narrowly losing their qualifying encounter with Spain 3–2 on aggregate; Charles played in both legs, though with Alfredo Di Stéfano in the team Spain were always considered the favourites.

His final game for Wales came on 20 March 1963, in a 1–1 draw with Hungary in a 1964 European Nations' Cup qualifying game. In total, he picked up 31 senior caps and scored six goals in a seven-year international career. Charles served as captain for a number of these games. He also captained Wales under-23s in a 2–1 win over England under-23s on 23 April 1958.

=== Caps ===
International appearances and goals
#	Date	Venue	Opponent	Result	Competition	Goals
1	20 April 1955	Windsor Park, Belfast	Northern Ireland	3–2	1955 British Home Championship	
2	23 November 1955	Racecourse Ground, Wrexham	Austria	1–2	Friendly	
3	30 October 1956	Ninian Park, Cardiff	Scotland	2–2	1957 British Home Championship	
4	14 November 1956	Wembley Stadium, London	FR Yugoslavia	1–3	1957 British Home Championship	
5	10 April 1957	Windsor Park, Belfast	Northern Ireland	0–0	1957 British Home Championship	
6	1 May 1957	Ninian Park, Cardiff	Czechoslovakia	1–0	1958 FIFA World Cup qualifier	
7	19 May 1957	Zentralstadion, Leipzig	East Germany	1–2	1958 FIFA World Cup qualifier	1
8	26 May 1957	Stadion Juliska, Prague	Czechoslovakia	0–2	1958 FIFA World Cup qualifier	
9	25 September 1957	Ninian Park, Cardiff	East Germany	4–1	1958 FIFA World Cup qualifier	
10	19 October 1957	Ninian Park, Cardiff	England	0–4	1958 British Home Championship	
11	15 January 1958	Ramat Gan Stadium, Tel Aviv	Israel	2–0	1958 FIFA World Cup qualifier	
12	5 February 1958	Ninian Park, Cardiff	Israel	2–0	1958 FIFA World Cup qualifier	
13	8 June 1958	Jernvallen, Sandviken	Hungary	1–1	1958 FIFA World Cup	
14	11 June 1958	Råsunda Stadium, Stockholm	Mexico	1–1	1958 FIFA World Cup	
15	15 June 1958	Råsunda Stadium, Stockholm	Sweden	0–0	1958 FIFA World Cup	
16	17 June 1958	Råsunda Stadium, Stockholm	Hungary	2–1	1958 FIFA World Cup	
17	19 June 1958	Ullevi, Gothenburg	Brazil	0–1	1958 FIFA World Cup	
18	18 October 1958	Ninian Park, Cardiff	Scotland	0–3	1959 British Home Championship	
19	26 November 1958	Villa Park, Birmingham	England	2–2	1959 British Home Championship	
20	4 November 1959	Hampden Park, Glasgow	Scotland	1–1	1960 British Home Championship	
21	12 April 1961	Windsor Park, Belfast	Northern Ireland	5–1	1961 British Home Championship	1
22	19 April 1961	Ninian Park, Cardiff	Spain	1–2	1962 World Cup qualifier	
23	18 May 1961	Madrid	Spain	1–1	1962 World Cup qualifier	
24	28 May 1961	Budapest	Hungary	2–3	Friendly	
25	8 November 1961	Hampden Park, Glasgow	Scotland	0–2	1962 British Home Championship	
26	11 April 1962	Ninian Park, Cardiff	Northern Ireland	4–0	1962 British Home Championship	4
27	12 May 1962	Maracanã Stadium, Rio de Janeiro	Brazil	1–3	Friendly	
28	16 May 1962	São Paulo	Brazil	1–3	Friendly	
29	22 May 1962	Mexico City	Mexico	1–2	Friendly	
30	20 October 1962	Ninian Park, Cardiff	Scotland	2–3	1963 British Home Championship	
31	20 March 1963	Ninian Park, Cardiff	Hungary	1–1	1964 European Nations' Cup qualifier	

== Personal life and post-retirement activities ==
He was the brother of all-round player John Charles and father of former Wales international Jeremy Charles.

In March 1958, Charles married Vera (surname Frame). His brother John Charles was unable to attend the wedding as he was in Italy at the time. It was a triple wedding, as Swansea teammates Don Pearson and Jeff Rees also married their partners in the same ceremony. In September 1959 Vera gave birth to a son, Jeremy, who went on to play for Swansea and Wales himself. They also had a daughter, Catherine. The couple divorced in 1972, though remained good friends.

After he left the professional game he found himself 'virtually penniless'. He tried jobs as a door-to-door shoe salesman, as a scrap metal dealer (along with brother John), as a butcher, and as a potato merchant, often failing in a spectacular and humorous fashion.

Charles' autobiography, entitled In the Shadow of a Giant, was released by John Blake Publishing in 2009. The title is a reference to his elder brother, John Charles, who became one of the biggest names in football as Mel was building his own career. The foreword was written by John Toshack and Jack Charlton.

After a period of ill health, Charles died on 24 September 2016, at the age of 81.

== Career statistics ==
=== Club ===
Appearances and goals by club, season and competition
Club	Season	League			FA Cup		Other		Total	
Club	Season	Division	Apps	Goals	Apps	Goals	Apps	Goals	Apps	Goals
Swansea Town	1952–53	Second Division	20	0	1	0	0	0	21	0
Swansea Town	1953–54	Second Division	31	10	3	0	0	0	34	10
Swansea Town	1954–55	Second Division	38	11	4	0	0	0	42	11
Swansea Town	1955–56	Second Division	34	8	1	0	0	0	35	8
Swansea Town	1956–57	Second Division	39	13	1	0	0	0	40	13
Swansea Town	1957–58	Second Division	40	10	1	1	0	0	41	11
Swansea Town	1958–59	Second Division	31	14	1	1	0	0	32	15
Swansea Town	Total		233	66	12	2	0	0	245	68
Arsenal	1959–60	First Division	20	8	1	0	0	0	21	8
Arsenal	1960–61	First Division	19	3	1	0	0	0	20	3
Arsenal	1961–62	First Division	21	15	2	2	0	0	23	17
Arsenal	Total		60	26	4	2	0	0	64	28
Cardiff City	1961–62	First Division	12	3	0	0	0	0	12	3
Cardiff City	1962–63	Second Division	33	11	1	0	2	1	36	12
Cardiff City	1963–64	Second Division	26	9	1	0	1	0	28	9
Cardiff City	1964–65	Second Division	8	2	0	0	1	0	9	2
Cardiff City	Total		79	25	2	0	4	1	85	26
Port Vale	1966–67	Fourth Division	7	0	0	0	0	0	7	0
Career total			379	117	18	4	4	1	401	122

=== International ===
Wales national team
Year	Apps	Goals
1955	4	0
1956	1	0
1957	7	1
1958	9	0
1961	6	1
1962	4	4
Total	31	6

== Honours ==
Swansea Town

- Welsh Cup runner-up: 1956 & 1957

Cardiff City

- Welsh Cup: 1964
