= When Pelé Broke Our Hearts =

1998 book by Mario Risoli

- First Edition Cover, 1998
- Author: Mario Risoli
- Language: English
- Genre: Popular history
- Publisher: St David's Press, Cardiff
- Publication date: November 1998; Reprinted October 2001
- Publication place: United Kingdom
- Media type: Print (Paperback)
- Pages: 161 pp
- ISBN: 1-86057-025-9 (1st imp.) ISBN 1-902719-02-6 (New ed.)

When Pelé Broke Our Hearts: Wales & the 1958 World Cup is a 1998 book by Mario Risoli recounting the Welsh national football team's 1958 World Cup campaign. Wales registered three draws in their group stage then won a tie-breaker against Hungary, advancing to the quarter-finals where they lost 1–0 to Brazil, through a goal by 17-year-old Pelé. As of 2020, this is the only appearance by Wales at the World Cup.

Much of the story is from the perspective of the Welsh players, but many other sources were used, such as newspaper articles.

A total of 17 players were interviewed: Colin Baker, brothers John Charles and Mel Charles, Trevor Ford, Alan Harrington, Ron Hewitt, Mel Hopkins, Cliff Jones, Ken Jones, Ken Leek, Terry Medwin, Kenny Morgans, Des Palmer, Ron Stitfall, Derek Tapscott, Colin Webster and Stuart Williams.

In addition to being one of the interviewees, John Charles also wrote the foreword. The 2001 edition also includes a preface by Manic Street Preachers' Nicky Wire.
