= Football in Wales =

- Country: Wales
- Governing body: Football Association of Wales
- National team: men's national team
- First played: 1876; 150 years ago

National competitions
- FIFA World Cup; UEFA European Championship; UEFA Nations League

Club competitions
- Cymru Premier; Cymru North; Cymru South; Ardal Leagues; Cups: Welsh Cup; Welsh League Cup

International competitions
- FIFA Club World Cup; UEFA Champions League; UEFA Europa League; UEFA Conference League; UEFA Super Cup

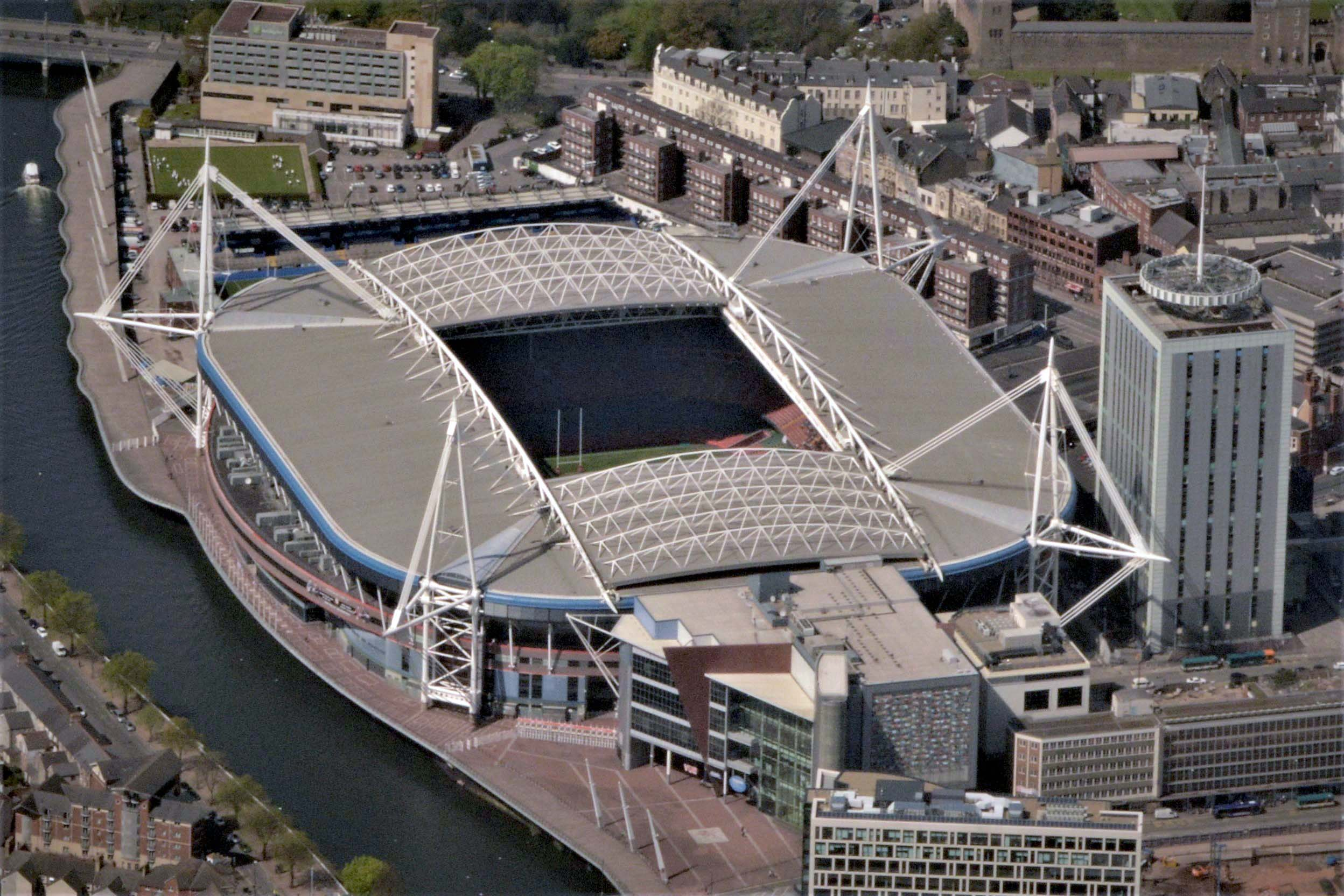
The Principality Stadium is the largest football stadium by capacity in Wales.

Association football is one of the most popular sports in Wales, along with rugby union. Wales has produced club teams of varying fortunes since the early birth of football during the Victorian period, and in 1876 a Wales national football team played their first international match. Football has always had a close rivalry with the country's de facto national sport rugby union, and it is much discussed as to which is Wales' more popular game. The Football Association of Wales (FAW), was established in 1876 to oversee the Wales national team and govern the sport in Wales, later creating and running the Welsh football league system.

Welsh professional club teams traditionally played in the same leagues as their English counterparts, structured into regional divisions. This often resulted in teams from north and south Wales not facing each other as the transport links between the two regions were poor. In 1992 the Cymru Premier was formed to create a national league. Five Welsh clubs refused to join, but despite this the teams that come top of the Cymru Premier have a greater chance of playing in European competition, as the top three clubs are drawn into the UEFA Champions League and the UEFA Europa League. They also have the opportunity to compete in the Welsh Cup, the most prestigious cup competition in Welsh football.

Currently, the four biggest clubs in Wales are professional clubs in the English Football League between the second and fourth tiers. Those are Wrexham, Swansea City, Cardiff City and Newport County. Both Cardiff and Swansea have won domestic cup titles in England and have played in the top division.

Until 2016 the Wales national team rarely qualified for the major international tournaments, with its only appearance in the World Cup occurring in 1958. However, they reached the semi-finals of UEFA Euro 2016 and the last 16 of UEFA Euro 2020, as well as having qualified for the 2022 World Cup. This has led to some players from Wales not being seen at the biggest international tournaments, though many of them have made a name for themselves at club level. Welsh players of note include Trevor Ford, Cliff Jones, John Charles, Ian Rush, Mark Hughes, Neville Southall, Ryan Giggs, Aaron Ramsey and Gareth Bale while in Wales Ivor Allchurch, Fred Keenor and Jack Kelsey are cherished.

Dragon Park, the Wales National Football Development Centre, is located in Newport.

As the Welsh domestic league system is not professional, many Welsh people support teams from England or Wales that compete in England. The most supported football club in Wales is Liverpool.

== History ==
The game that would become Association football was first codified in Britain in the mid-19th century, and by the 1860s and 1870s became established in industrial towns in the Midlands and north of England. The north Wales towns of Wrexham and Ruabon also adopted the sport in this era. Wrexham A.F.C., founded in 1864, is Wales' oldest professional club and the third oldest in the world. This interest led to the formation of the Football Association of Wales (FAW) in 1876 by Welsh solicitor Llewelyn Kenrick and this was followed in 1877 by the creation of the Welsh Cup. In 1877 the FAW formed the first Wales national football team who played their first game that year, losing 4–0 away to Scotland.

The Wrexham area was the centre of football in Wales for the first twenty years, with the south of the country preferring to follow the emerging sport of rugby union. The first time an international game was held in the south was in 1894, hosted in Swansea, which was the 46th match the Wales team had played. More telling in the north–south divide that existed in the sport was that it was not until the 67th fixture that the first southern player was selected for the national team. The 1890s and early 1900s saw an increase in competitive association football in south Wales, but the Triple Crown success of the Wales rugby team in the 1893 Home Nations Championship heralded the start of the first "Golden era" of Welsh rugby, culminating in the famous Game of the Century, where a sell out crowd at Cardiff Arms Park watched Wales win against the previously undefeated Original All Blacks in 1905, all of which would contribute to rugby union becoming perceived as the primary sport in the area. The modern era of association football in Wales is agreed to have begun during the 1909–10 season when the first of six teams from the south joined the Southern Football League. Wrexham F.C. had already joined the Birmingham and District League during the 1905–06 season, but the introduction of Swansea, Newport, Ton Pentre, Merthyr Tydfil, Aberdare and Riverside into the Southern Leagues saw an increase in popularity of the sport in Wales. This was cemented with vital wins in the league and then in 1915, Swansea's surprise win over the then reigning League Champions, Blackburn Rovers F.C. in the FA Cup.

In May 2012 the FAW, Scottish Football Association and the Football Association of Ireland formally declared an interest in co-hosting UEFA Euro 2020.

The two major trophies for Welsh club teams playing in England are the 1927 FA Cup for Cardiff City and the 2013 League Cup trophy for Swansea City.

== League system ==
=== Cymru Premier ===
The Cymru Premier, formerly named the League of Wales and the Welsh Premier League, was founded in 1992 as Wales did not have a national league at that time. Teams relegated from the Cymru Premier are either relegated to the Cymru North (Northern Wales) or the Cymru South (Southern Wales). Originally the Premier league had 18 teams, but from the 2010–11 season onwards there have been only 12, following a proposal by the clubs in the League.

=== Second tier and onwards ===
==== Northern Wales ====
Northern Wales has a league at Tier 2 level—the Cymru North, which has a feeder league structure of its own with two regional leagues feeding it—the Ardal Leagues North East and North West (covering all of the north including Wrexham). Again, the champions or runners-up of these leagues can be promoted given suitable ground facilities.

Below these third tier leagues are even more localised leagues: in Central Wales there are three leagues feeding into the Mid Wales League (covering Ceredigion and Powys, Montgomeryshire, and Mid Wales South areas respectively), while below League One North 1 and 2 there are the North Wales Coast East & West leagues' Premier Divisions and the North East Wales League's Premier Division, and these even have feeder leagues of their own such as the former's First Divisions and the latter's Championship.

==== Southern Wales ====
In the south, the Tier 2 level league is the Cymru South— which has promotion from the two other Ardal Leagues - South East and South West. This covers the whole of the southern Wales geographical area, and it is not until the fourth tier of the pyramid that local leagues appear. Promotion to, and relegation from the Ardal Leagues is structured, as in the north, on three regional football associations (Gwent FA, South Wales FA, and West Wales FA). Each can send one promoted team into League One.

In the Gwent FA area, there is one senior league, the Gwent County League, whose champions (or runners-up) are eligible, if they satisfy FAW criteria. (Below the three divisions of the Gwent County, there are the Newport and District, East Gwent, Central Gwent and North Gwent leagues)

The South Wales FA area has the South Wales Alliance League — whereby the champions could be promoted to Ardal Leagues subject to meeting criteria. Below these two leagues are local leagues in the towns and cities of South Wales, the champions of which may play off to be promoted into the South Wales Alliance.

The West Wales FA area has its own Premier League since its creation before the 2020–21 season and until then that FA was the only one not to have set up a senior league in its area – this means that there are four local leagues (Pembrokeshire, Carmarthenshire, Swansea and Neath & District) with all their champions potentially having to play-off for the one available promotion place. However, as few west Wales clubs can face the prospect of the travelling implications of moving up to the Premier League, this four-way play-off idea is in theory rather than practice. The latest clubs to gain promotion from this region were Llansawel in 2006 (from the Neath & District League), West End in 2005 (from the Swansea Senior League), Ystradgynlais in 2004 (from the Neath & District League), Cwmamman United in 2002 (from the Neath & District League) and Garden Village in 1999 (from the Carmarthenshire League).

== Welsh teams in the English leagues ==
Cardiff City, Swansea City and Wrexham currently play in the EFL Championship, and Newport County competes in EFL League Two. Merthyr Town currently compete in the sixth-tier National League North. These five teams have all played in the English football league system since their founding, and all declined the offer to move into the League of Wales, now known as the Cymru Premier, when it was founded in 1992. However, the Welsh teams Bangor City, Barry Town, Caernarfon Town, Colwyn Bay, Newtown and Rhyl did move into the Welsh league system from the English league system. Welsh teams participating in the English football league system can enter the English FA Cup competition, but not the Welsh Cup.

Welsh teams participating below level 4 of the English football league system are governed by the FAW for disciplinary and administrative matters, whereas Welsh teams at level 4 and above of the English football league system are administered by the English FA for the 2011–12 season onwards.

From 1996 to 2011, the FAW only allowed teams in the Welsh league system to enter the Welsh Cup. Prior to 1996, Welsh teams playing in the English league system were invited to participate along with some English teams located near the Welsh border. As this rule excluded the biggest Welsh clubs from the Welsh Cup, the FAW launched the FAW Premier Cup in the 1997–98 season to include the top Welsh Premier League teams and the top Welsh teams in the English league system. The FAW Premier Cup was discontinued after the 2007–08 season. On 20 April 2011, the Football Association of Wales invited the six Welsh clubs playing in the English league system to rejoin the Welsh Cup for the 2011–12 season with Newport County, Wrexham and Merthyr Town accepting. The invitation was not offered for the 2012–13 season.

There are also a number of English-based teams in the Welsh leagues, see List of association football clubs playing in the league of another country.

Welsh clubs in English leagues
Club	League
Swansea City	EFL Championship
Wrexham	EFL Championship
Cardiff City	EFL Championship
Newport County	EFL League Two
Merthyr Town	National League North

=== Attendances ===
The 2013–14 season marked the first time two Welsh clubs competed in the Premier League. The table below shows the average home league attendance of both clubs during that season.

#	Club	Average
1	Cardiff City	27,430
2	Swansea City	20,407

== Cup competitions ==
- Welsh Cup – Is the oldest and most prized cup trophy in Wales, the cup is open to teams in the Welsh football league system. Until 1995 any Welsh club playing in the English league were allowed to participate and, by invitation, some English clubs. The winner of the cup is given a UEFA Europa League qualifying place.
- Welsh League Cup – Is only open to the Welsh Premier League clubs.
- FAW Trophy – Is open to Clubs at level 2 of the Welsh football league system
- Welsh Football League Cup – Is only competed by the clubs participating in the three Welsh Football League tiers.

== Qualification for European competitions ==
Competition	Who Qualifies	Notes
UEFA Champions League second qualifying round	Champions of Cymru Premier	
UEFA Europa League first qualifying round	Runner-up of Cymru Premier; Winner of UEFA Europa League play-off (3–7 place in league)	8th place will take place of a domestic cup winner who finishes in 3–7 place
UEFA Europa League second qualifying round	Winners of Welsh Cup	

== Women's football ==
The Wales women's national football team has yet to qualify for a World Cup.

In 2024, Wales qualified for the UEFA Women's Euro 2025, which will be held in Switzerland, after defeating the Republic of Ireland 2–1. This is the first time Wales has been represented at the European Championship.

== Support ==
=== Facebook followers (2017) ===
==== Nationwide ====
Clubs by Facebook followers in Wales (2017)
Club	Followers
(England) Arsenal	50,000
(Wales) Cardiff City	70,000
(England) Chelsea	57,000
(England) Everton	40,000
(England) Liverpool	125,000
(England) Manchester City	32,500
(England) Manchester United	95,000
(Wales) Swansea City	60,000
(England) Tottenham Hotspur	45,000
(England) West Ham United	20,000

==== Cardiff ====
Clubs by Facebook followers in Cardiff (2017)
Club	Followers
(England) Arsenal	7,000
(Wales) Cardiff City	25,000
(England) Chelsea	6,500
(England) Liverpool	15,000
(England) Manchester United	12,500
(Wales) Swansea City	3,000
(England) Tottenham Hotspur	5,500

== Football stadiums ==
Stadium	Capacity	Tenants	Image
Millennium Stadium	74,500	Wales	
Cardiff City Stadium	26,828	Cardiff City	
Swansea.com Stadium	20,520	Swansea City	
Racecourse Ground	15,500	Wrexham	
Park Avenue	5,500	Aberystwyth	

== Most successful clubs overall ==
As of 17 May 2026

local and lower league organizations are not included.

Club	Domestic Titles							
Club	Cymru Premier	Welsh Cup	FA Cup	Welsh League Cup	EFL Cup	FA Community Shield	FAW Premier Cup	Total
The New Saints	**18**	10	-	**11**	-	-	1	**40**
Wrexham	-	**23**	-	-	-	-	**5**	28
Cardiff City	-	22	**1**	-	-	**1**	1	25
Barry Town United	7	6	-	5	-	-	1	19
Swansea City	-	10	-	-	**1**	-	2	13
Bangor City	3	8	-	-	-	-	-	11
Rhyl	2	4	-	2	-	-	-	8
Cefn Druids	-	8	-	-	-	-	-	8
Connah's Quay Nomads	2	2	-	3	-	-	-	7
Chirk AAA	-	5	-	-	-	-	-	5
Carmarthen Town	-	1	-	3	-	-	-	4
Llanelli Town	1	1	-	1	-	-	-	3
Merthyr Tydfil	-	3	-	-	-	-	-	3
Afan Lido	-	-	-	3	-	-	-	3
Caersws	-	-	-	3	-	-	-	3
Bala Town	-	1	-	1	-	-	-	2
Newport County	-	1	-	-	-	-	1	2
Cwmbrân Town	1	-	-	-	-	-	-	1
Aberystwyth Town	-	1	-	-	-	-	-	1
Borough United	-	1	-	-	-	-	-	1
Caernarfon Town	-	1	-	-	-	-	-	1
Connah's Quay & Shotton	-	1	-	-	-	-	-	1
Ebbw Vale	-	1	-	-	-	-	-	1
Flint Town United	-	1	-	-	-	-	-	1
Inter Cardiff	-	1	-	-	-	-	-	1
Lovell's Athletic	-	1	-	-	-	-	-	1
Newtown	-	1	-	-	-	-	-	1
Prestatyn Town	-	1	-	-	-	-	-	1
White Stars	-	1	-	-	-	-	-	1
Cardiff Met	-	-	-	1	-	-	-	1
Shrewsbury Town (England)	-	6	-	-	-	-	-	6
Chester City (England)	-	3	-	-	-	-	-	3
Telford United (England)	-	3	-	-	-	-	-	3
Crewe Alexandra (England)	-	2	-	-	-	-	-	2
Oswestry United (England)	-	2	-	-	-	-	-	2
Bristol City (England)	-	1	-	-	-	-	-	1
Hereford United (England)	-	1	-	-	-	-	-	1
Oswestry (England)	-	1	-	-	-	-	-	1
South Liverpool (England)	-	1	-	-	-	-	-	1
Tranmere Rovers (England)	-	1	-	-	-	-	-	1

- The articles in italic indicate the defunct leagues and the defunct cups.
- The figures in **bold** indicate the most times this competition has been won by a team.
- English teams that have won the Welsh Cup that have not play at Welsh football system are listed at the bottom of table.

== See also ==
- Football in the United Kingdom
- Women's football in Wales
- Welsh football league system
- Welsh Cup
- Welsh League Cup
- FAW Premier Cup
- South Wales derby
- List of football clubs in Wales
- List of stadiums in Wales by capacity
- List of football matches between British national teams
- List of football matches between British clubs in UEFA competitions
- Wales bucket hat
- Football Museum for Wales

== Bibliography ==
- Stead, Phil. Red Dragons: The Story of Welsh Football. (ISBN 9781784612368)
- Risoli, Mario. When Pelé Broke Our Hearts: Wales and the 1958 World Cup. (ISBN 1-902719-02-6)
- Burnell, Nick. Trailing Clouds of Glory: Welsh Football's Forgotten Heroes of 1976.
