= Ivor Jones (footballer) =

Welsh footballer (1899–1974)

Personal information
- Date of birth: 31 July 1899
- Place of birth: Merthyr Tydfil, Wales
- Date of death: 24 November 1974 (aged 75)
- Place of death: Swansea, Wales
- Position: Inside right

Senior career*
Years	Team	Apps	(Gls)
- Merthyr Town
- Caerphilly
1920–1922	Swansea Town	65	(14)
1922–1926	West Bromwich Albion	67	(10)
- Aberystwyth Town
- Aldershot
- Thames
- Eastside
- Aberavon Harlequins

International career
1920–1926	Wales	10	(1)
- * Club domestic league appearances and goals

Ivor Jones (31 July 1899 – 24 November 1974) was a Welsh international footballer who played professionally as an inside right.

== Family ==
Jones came from a footballing family. His four brothers – Bryn, Shoni, Emlyn and Bert – were all professionals, as were his sons Bryn and Cliff and nephew Ken. His great-grandson Scott Neilson is also a professional footballer.

== Club career ==
Jones played for Merthyr Town, Caerphilly, Swansea Town, West Bromwich Albion, Aberystwyth Town, Aldershot, Thames, Eastside and Aberavon Harlequins.

== International career ==
Jones earned a total of 10 caps for Wales, scoring one goal.
