= 1958 FIFA World Cup qualification – UEFA Group 4 =

Football tournament

The three teams in this group played against each other on a home-and-away basis. The group winner Czechoslovakia qualified for the sixth FIFA World Cup held in Sweden.

Wales were drawn to play against Israel in a special play-off.

== Table ==
Pos	Team	Pld	W	D	L	GF	GA	GR	Pts	Qualification	Czechoslovakia national football team	Wales national football team	East Germany national football team
1	Czechoslovakia	4	3	0	1	9	3	3.000	6	Qualification to 1958 FIFA World Cup	—	2–0	3–1
2	Wales	4	2	0	2	6	5	1.200	4	Drawn for CAF/AFC–UEFA play-off	1–0	—	4–1
3	East Germany	4	1	0	3	5	12	0.417	2		1–4	2–1	—

Source: FIFA

== Matches ==
1 May 1957

Wales	1 – 0	Czechoslovakia
Vernon 75'	Report

Attendance: 33,200
Referee: Bronkhorst (Netherlands)

19 May 1957

East Germany	2 – 1	Wales
Wirth 21'; Tröger 61'	Report	M. Charles 6'

Attendance: 100,000
Referee: Latyshev (Soviet Union)

26 May 1957

Czechoslovakia	2 – 0	Wales
Daniel 21' (o.g.); Kraus 65'	Report

Attendance: 45,000
Referee: Paul Wyssling (Switzerland)

16 June 1957

Czechoslovakia	3 – 1	East Germany
Kraus 60'; Bubník 81'; Molnár 89'	Report	Wirth 18'

Attendance: 50,000
Referee: Jörgensen (Denmark)

25 September 1957

Wales	4 – 1	East Germany
Palmer 38', 44', 73'; Jones 42'	Report	Kaiser 57'

Attendance: 16,098
Referee: Leafe (England)

27 October 1957

East Germany	1 – 4	Czechoslovakia
H. Müller 35'	Report	Kraus 4', 88'; Moravčík 23'; Novák 43'

Attendance: 110,000
Referee: Schwinte (France)
