= Emlyn Jones =

Welsh footballer (1907–?)

Personal information
- Date of birth: 29 November 1907
- Place of birth: Merthyr Tydfil, Wales

Senior career*
Years	Team	Apps	(Gls)
- Everton
1929–1936	Southend United	236	(30)
- Shirley Town
- * Club domestic league appearances and goals

Emlyn Jones, also known as Mickey Jones (born 29 November 1907) was a Welsh professional footballer.

== Career ==
Born in Merthyr Tydfil, Jones played for Everton, Southend United and Shirley Town.

== Family ==
Jones was one of five brothers who all played professional football, the others being Shoni, Ivor, Bryn and Bert. His son Ken and nephews Bryn and Cliff were also players.
