= Bryn Jones (footballer, born 1912) =

Welsh footballer (1912–1985)

Personal information
- Full name: Brynmor Jones
- Date of birth: 14 February 1912
- Place of birth: Merthyr Tydfil, Wales
- Date of death: 18 October 1985 (aged 73)
- Place of death: Wood Green, London, England
- Position: Inside forward

Youth career
- Merthyr Amateurs
- Plymouth United
- Glenavon
- Aberaman Athletic

Senior career*
Years	Team	Apps	(Gls)
1933–1938	Wolverhampton Wanderers	163	(52)
1938–1949	Arsenal	71	(7)
1949–1951	Norwich City	23	(1)
Total		257	(60)

International career
1935–1948	Wales	17	(5)
- * Club domestic league appearances and goals

Brynmor Jones (14 February 1912 – 18 October 1985) was a Welsh professional footballer who played as an inside forward.

== Club career ==
=== Early life and Wolves ===
Born in Penyard near Merthyr Tydfil, Jones played for a variety of clubs as a youth, including Merthyr Amateurs, Glenavon and Aberaman Athletic, before signing for Wolverhampton Wanderers in 1933 for a fee of £1,500. In five years for Wolves he played 163 league matches.

=== Arsenal ===
Jones's exploits for Wolves earned the attention of George Allison's Arsenal, who were looking for a replacement for Alex James'. Arsenal paid a then British record fee of £14,000 to take him to Highbury in August 1938.

Jones got off to a dream start for Arsenal, scoring on his debut against Portsmouth and then netting two more goals in the next three matches.

Jones served with the Royal Artillery during the Second World War, and was aged 34 when competitive football resumed. He made seven league appearances for Arsenal in 1947–48, in which Arsenal won the First Division Championship, but he did not play enough games to qualify for a medal.

Jones played and scored in Arsenal's triumphant 1948 Charity Shield match against Manchester United. With this being said he was still only a bit-part player in the 1948–49 season. Jones in all played 76 matches for Arsenal, scoring 8 goals altogether. He went on to leave Arsenal to become a player-coach at Norwich City in 1949.

== International career ==
During his time at Wolves Jones also won the first of his 17 caps for Wales, against Northern Ireland in 1935. His international career lasted between 1935 and 1948, as well as a further eight wartime internationals, the highlight being a 2–1 win over England in 1936 at Molineux.

== Personal life ==
Jones was part of a famous footballing family; he was one of five brothers to play professional football, along with Shoni, Ivor, Emlyn and Bert. In addition his nephews, Cliff, Bryn and Ken were also professional footballers. After a spell coaching at Norwich City from 1949 to 1951 he retired soon afterwards. Jones then ran a newsagents near Arsenal's Highbury ground. He died in October 1985.

== Honours ==
Arsenal

- FA Charity Shield: 1938, 1948
