= Shoni Jones =

Welsh footballer

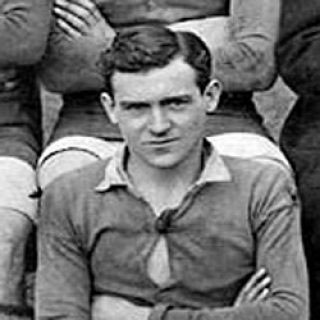
- Jones in 1922

Personal information
- Full name: William John Jones
- Place of birth: Wales

Senior career*
Years	Team	Apps	(Gls)
- Aberdare Athletic
- Ton Pentre
- * Club domestic league appearances and goals

William John "Shoni" Jones was a Welsh professional footballer who appeared in the English Football League for Aberdare Athletic and Ton Pentre.

== Family ==
Jones was one of five brothers who all played professional football, the others being Emlyn, Ivor, Bryn and Bert. His nephews Bryn, Cliff and Ken were also players.
