= Bryn Jones (footballer, born 1931) =

Welsh footballer (1931–1990)

Personal information
- Date of birth: 20 May 1931
- Place of birth: Swansea, Wales
- Date of death: October 1990 (aged 59)
- Position: Left-back

Senior career*
Years	Team	Apps	(Gls)
1952–1958	Swansea Town	121	(4)
1958–1960	Newport County	71	(11)
1960–1963	Bournemouth & Boscombe Athletic	118	(5)
1963	Northampton Town	7	(0)
1963–1967	Watford	91	(1)
- Chelmsford City
- Folkestone Invicta
Total		408	(21)
- * Club domestic league appearances and goals

Bryn Jones (20 May 1931 – October 1990) was a Welsh professional footballer who played as a left-back.

== Career ==
Born in Swansea, Jones played in the Football League for Swansea Town, Newport County, Bournemouth, Northampton Town and Watford, making a total of 408 appearances.

== Later life and death ==
After retiring as a professional in 1967, Jones played semi-professionally for Chelmsford City and Folkestone Invicta before becoming a school teacher. He died in October 1990.

== Family ==
Jones came from a footballing family. His father Ivor; uncles Shoni, Emlyn, Bryn and Bert; brother Cliff; and cousin Ken were also all players.
