= 1978 FIFA World Cup qualification – UEFA Group 7 =

Group 7 consisted of three of the 32 teams entered into the European zone: Czechoslovakia, Scotland, and Wales. These three teams competed on a home-and-away basis for one of the 8.5 spots in the final tournament allocated to the European zone. The spot would be assigned to the group's winner.

== Standings ==
| Pos | Team | Pld | W | D | L | GF | GA | GD | Pts |
|---|---|---|---|---|---|---|---|---|---|
| 1 | Scotland | 4 | 3 | 0 | 1 | 6 | 3 | +3 | 6 |
| 2 | Czechoslovakia | 4 | 2 | 0 | 2 | 4 | 6 | −2 | 4 |
| 3 | Wales | 4 | 1 | 0 | 3 | 3 | 4 | −1 | 2 |

== Matches ==
13 October 1976

| Czechoslovakia | 2–0 | Scotland |
|---|---|---|
| Panenka 48'; Petráš 50' | Report |

Sparta Stadion, Prague, Czechoslovakia
Referee: Michelotti (Italy)

17 November 1976

| Scotland | 1–0 | Wales |
|---|---|---|
| Evans 15' (o.g.) | Report |

Hampden Park, Glasgow, Scotland
Referee: Biwersi (West Germany)

30 March 1977

| Wales | 3–0 | Czechoslovakia |
|---|---|---|
| L. James 27', 65'; Deacy 65' | Report |

Wrexham, Wales
Referee: Garrido (Portugal)

21 September 1977

| Scotland | 3–1 | Czechoslovakia |
|---|---|---|
| Jordan 19'; Hartford 35'; Dalglish 54' | Report | Gajdůšek 82' |

Hampden Park, Glasgow, Scotland
Referee: Rion (Belgium)

12 October 1977

| Wales | 0–2 | Scotland |
|---|---|---|
| | Report | Masson 78' (pen.); Dalglish 85' |

Anfield, Liverpool, England
Referee: Wurtz (France)

16 November 1977

| Czechoslovakia | 1–0 | Wales |
|---|---|---|
| Nehoda 12' | Report |

Prague, Czechoslovakia
Referee: Prokop (East Germany)
