= Dick Mallory =

Bermudian footballer

Personal information
- Full name: Richard James Leroy Mallory
- Date of birth: 10 August 1942 (age 84)
- Place of birth: Bermuda
- Position: Winger

Senior career*
Years	Team	Apps	(Gls)
1963–1964	Cardiff City	3	(0)
- * Club domestic league appearances and goals

Richard James Leroy Mallory (born 10 August 1942) was a Bermudian professional footballer who played as a winger.

== Career ==
Born in Bermuda, Mallory impressed enough to be offered a chance with Cardiff City. He made four first team appearances as the club suffered an injury crisis at the start of the 1963–64 season but was released at the end of the campaign, returning to Bermuda.
