= Albert McCann =

English footballer

Personal information
- Date of birth: 1 November 1941
- Place of birth: Maidenhead, England
- Date of death: 9 January 2014 (aged 72)
- Place of death: Havant, England
- Position: Midfielder

Senior career*
Years	Team	Apps	(Gls)
1959–1960	Luton Town	6	(0)
1961–1962	Coventry City	22	(3)
1962–1974	Portsmouth	338	(85)
- * Club domestic league appearances and goals

Albert McCann (1 November 1941 – 9 January 2014) was an English footballer who played as a midfielder, winger or forward.

McCann began his career with Luton Town but made only 6 league appearances before joining Coventry City (22 League appearances). He moved to Portsmouth in 1962 and would enjoy a 12-year stay at the club, becoming a fan favourite and a regular scorer and creator of goals on the wings, in midfield or up front. He was inducted into the club's "Hall of Fame" in March 2011.
