= Gordon Atherton =

English footballer

Personal information
- Full name: Francis Gordon Atherton
- Date of birth: 18 June 1934 (age 92)
- Place of birth: Horwich, England
- Position: Right half

Senior career*
| Years | Team | Apps | (Gls) |
| 1955–1964 | Bury | 327 | (14) |
| 1964–1965 | Swindon Town | 31 | (0) |
| 1965–1966 | Bury | 7 | (0) |
| 1966–1967 | Drumcondra | | |
| Total | | 365 | (14) |
- * Club domestic league appearances and goals

Francis Gordon Atherton (born 18 June 1934) is an English former footballer who played as a right half in the Football League.

Atherton played for Bury, Swindon Town and Drumcondra.

He signed professional forms with Bury in 1956 and has been a regular first-team choice ever since gaining his place in his initial season. Was an ever-present when Bury won promotion to Div 2 in 1960–1961. He was described as "An attacking wing-half who gets through a tremendous amount of work".

Atherton played for Swindon Town from 1964 to 1965, then back to Bury from 1965 to 1966 before playing for Drumcondra in Dublin from 1966 to 1967.
