= Dick Scott (footballer) =

English footballer

Richard (Dick) Scott
Personal information
- Full name: Richard Sydney Arthur Scott
- Date of birth: 26 October 1941
- Place of birth: Thetford, England
- Date of death: 11 February 2018 (aged 76)
- Position: Midfielder

Senior career*
Years	Team	Apps	(Gls)
1960–1963	Norwich City	28	(1)
1963–1964	Cardiff City	37	(5)
1964–1966	Scunthorpe United	47	(8)
1966–1967	Lincoln City	10	(1)
- King's Lynn
Total		122	(15)
- * Club domestic league appearances and goals

Richard Scott (26 October 1941 – 11 February 2018) was an English footballer who played in the Football League for Cardiff City, Lincoln City, Norwich City and Scunthorpe United.

== Honours ==
Norwich City

- Football League Cup: 1961–62
