= Herbie Williams =

Welsh footballer (1940–2026)

Personal information
- Full name: Herbert John Williams Jr.
- Date of birth: 6 October 1940
- Place of birth: Swansea, Wales
- Date of death: 22 June 2026 (aged 85)
- Position: Inside forward

Youth career
- 1955–1958: Swansea City

Senior career*
Years	Team	Apps	(Gls)
1958–1975	Swansea City	513	(104)

International career
1964–1971	Wales	3	(0)
- * Club domestic league appearances and goals

Herbert John Williams Jr. (6 October 1940 – 22 June 2026) was a Welsh footballer who played as an inside forward for Swansea City and made three appearances for the Wales national team.

== Career ==
Born in Swansea, Williams spent his entire professional career with hometown club Swansea City, making 513 appearances in the English Football League between 1958 and 1975.

After leaving Swansea, Williams spent the 1975 season as player-coach of Australian side Balgownie Rangers.

He also earned three international caps for Wales, appearing in two FIFA World Cup qualifying matches.

== Death ==
Williams died on 22 June 2026, aged 85.

== See also ==
- List of one-club men in association football
