= 1961–62 British Home Championship =

Tournament details
- Host country: England, Ireland, Scotland and Wales
- Dates: 7 October 1961 – 14 April 1962
- Teams: 4

Final positions
- Champions: Scotland
- Runners-up: Wales

Tournament statistics
- Matches played: 6
- Goals scored: 19 (3.17 per match)
- Top scorer: (Wales) Mel Charles (4)

The 1961–62 British Home Championship was a football competition played in the season preceding the 1962 FIFA World Cup in Chile, for which only England had qualified from the home nations. Although they were expected to do well in the World Cup, England suffered a poor home championship and were eventually dispatched from the World Cup by the eventual winner Brazil in the quarter-finals.

The Home Championship began very well for Scotland, who in their first match scored a 6–1 defeat of Ireland in Belfast. England could not match this pace in their encounter with Wales who held them to a draw and became a contender for the title in the process. In the second game the Scots beat the Welsh 2–0 but England again failed to impress, again drawing 1–1 with the poor Irish. In the final matches, Wales beat Ireland comprehensively with Mel Charles taking all four goals and achieving second position, whilst England played Scotland knowing that only a win would get them the title. In the event, the impressive Scots ran out 2–0 winners, taking the championship and achieving a rare whitewash of the other three teams.

== Table ==
Team	Pld	W	D	L	GF	GA	GD	Pts
Scotland (C)	3	3	0	0	10	1	+9	6
Wales	3	1	1	1	5	3	+2	3
England	3	0	2	1	2	4	−2	2
Ireland	3	0	1	2	2	11	−9	1

Rules for classification: 1) points. The points system worked as follows: 2 points for a win and 1 point for a draw.
(C) Champions

== Results ==
7 October 1961

Ireland	1–6	Scotland
McLaughlin		Scott; Brand; Wilson

Windsor Park, Belfast

14 October 1961

Wales	1–1	England
Williams		Douglas

Ninian Park, Cardiff

22 November 1961

England	1–1	Ireland
Charlton		McIlroy

Wembley Stadium, London

8 November 1961

Scotland	2–0	Wales
St John

Hampden Park, Glasgow

11 April 1962

Wales	4–0	Ireland
Charles

Ninian Park, Cardiff

14 April 1962

Scotland	2–0	England
Wilson; Caldow (pen.)

Hampden Park, Glasgow
