= Cyril Beech =

English footballer

Personal information
- Date of birth: 12 March 1925
- Place of birth: Tamworth, England
- Date of death: 2001 (aged 75–76)
- Position: Winger

Senior career*
Years	Team	Apps	(Gls)
- Merthyr Tydfil
1949–1954	Swansea Town	133	(29)
1954–1955	Worcester City		
1955–1957	Newport County	39	(8)
- Hereford United
Total		172	(37)
- * Club domestic league appearances and goals

Cyril Beech (12 March 1925 – May 2001) was an English footballer who played in the Football League for Newport County and Swansea Town. His brother Gilbert was also a professional footballer and played with Cyril at Swansea.

After his time at Hereford he also played for Merthyr Tydfil again, Brecon Corinthians and Brierley Hill.
