= Gordon Fraser (footballer) =

Scottish footballer

Personal information
- Full name: Gordon Fraser
- Date of birth: 27 November 1943 (age 82)
- Place of birth: Elgin, Moray, Scotland
- Position: Forward

Senior career*
Years	Team	Apps	(Gls)
- Forres Mechanics
1962–1963	Cardiff City	4	(0)
1963–1964	Millwall	5	(0)
1964–1965	Elgin City		
1965–1966	Barry Town		
1966–1967	Newport County	13	(2)
1967–1968	Weymouth		
Total		22	(2)
- * Club domestic league appearances and goals

Gordon Fraser (born 27 November 1943) is a Scottish former professional footballer. A product of the Scottish Highland Football League, Fraser played as a centre forward in the English Football League for Cardiff City, Millwall, and Newport County. He also played in the Scottish Highland Football League with Forres Mechanics FC, his first senior club, and subsequently with Elgin City on his return from Millwall.
