= Tommy Halliday =

Scottish footballer (born 1940)

Personal information
- Full name: Thomas Halliday
- Date of birth: 28 April 1940 (age 86)
- Place of birth: Ardrossan, Scotland
- Position: Centre-forward

Youth career
- Largs Thistle

Senior career*
Years	Team	Apps	(Gls)
1962–1963	Dumbarton	22	(18)
1963–1964	Cardiff City	16	(2)
1964–1965	Dumbarton	21	(4)
1965–1966	Greenock Morton	3	(0)
1966–1967	Stranraer	16	(6)
1967–1968	Alloa Athletic	1	(0)
- Largs Thistle
Total		79	(30)
- * Club domestic league appearances and goals

Thomas Halliday (born 28 April 1940) is a Scottish former professional footballer, who played for Dumbarton, Greenock Morton, Stranraer and Alloa Athletic in the Scottish Football League and Cardiff City in the Football League.

== Career ==
Halliday joined Dumbarton in March 1963 and made a goalscoring debut for the club in a 3–1 victory over East Stirlingshire. He scored 21 goals in 28 league appearances for Dumbarton, leading Cardiff City manager George Swindin to pay £5,000 to sign him in October 1963. He made his debut for the club in a 1–1 draw with South Wales rivals Swansea Town and made sixteen league appearances, scoring twice. However, he was displaced in the first team by Derek Tapscott and subsequently returned to Dumbarton.
