= Gilbert Beech =

English footballer

Personal information
- Full name: Gilbert Beech
- Date of birth: 9 January 1922
- Place of birth: Tamworth, England
- Date of death: 2009 (aged 86–87)
- Position: Defender

Senior career*
Years	Team	Apps	(Gls)
- Merthyr Tydfil
1949–1958	Swansea Town	157	(3)
- Merthyr Tydfil
- * Club domestic league appearances and goals

Gilbert Beech (9 January 1922 – 2009) was an English footballer who played in the Football League for Swansea Town. His brother Cyril was also a professional footballer and played with Gilbert at Swansea.

== Career ==
Beech, who played left-back, set the record for most consecutive league games started with Swansea at 106, since matched by Ashley Williams. While at Swansea, Beech played on the Swans team which won the 1949–50 Welsh Cup.

After his second spell at Merthyr he also played alongside his brother at Hereford United and Brecon Corinthians.
