= Ian Davidson (footballer, born 1937) =

Scottish footballer

Personal information
- Full name: Ian Davidson
- Date of birth: 8 September 1937 (age 89)
- Place of birth: Pencaitland, East Lothian, Scotland
- Position: Wing half

Senior career*
Years	Team	Apps	(Gls)
- Ormiston
1960–1962	Kilmarnock	46	(5)
1962–1964	Preston North End	67	(1)
1964–1967	Middlesbrough	46	(0)
1967–1968	Darlington	27	(0)
1968–1971	Durban United	59	(0)
1970	→ Bloemfontein City (loan)	11	(0)
1972	East London United		
- * Club domestic league appearances and goals

Ian Davidson (born 8 September 1937) is a Scottish former footballer who played in the Football League for Darlington, Middlesbrough and Preston North End.
