= Nick Deacy =

Welsh footballer

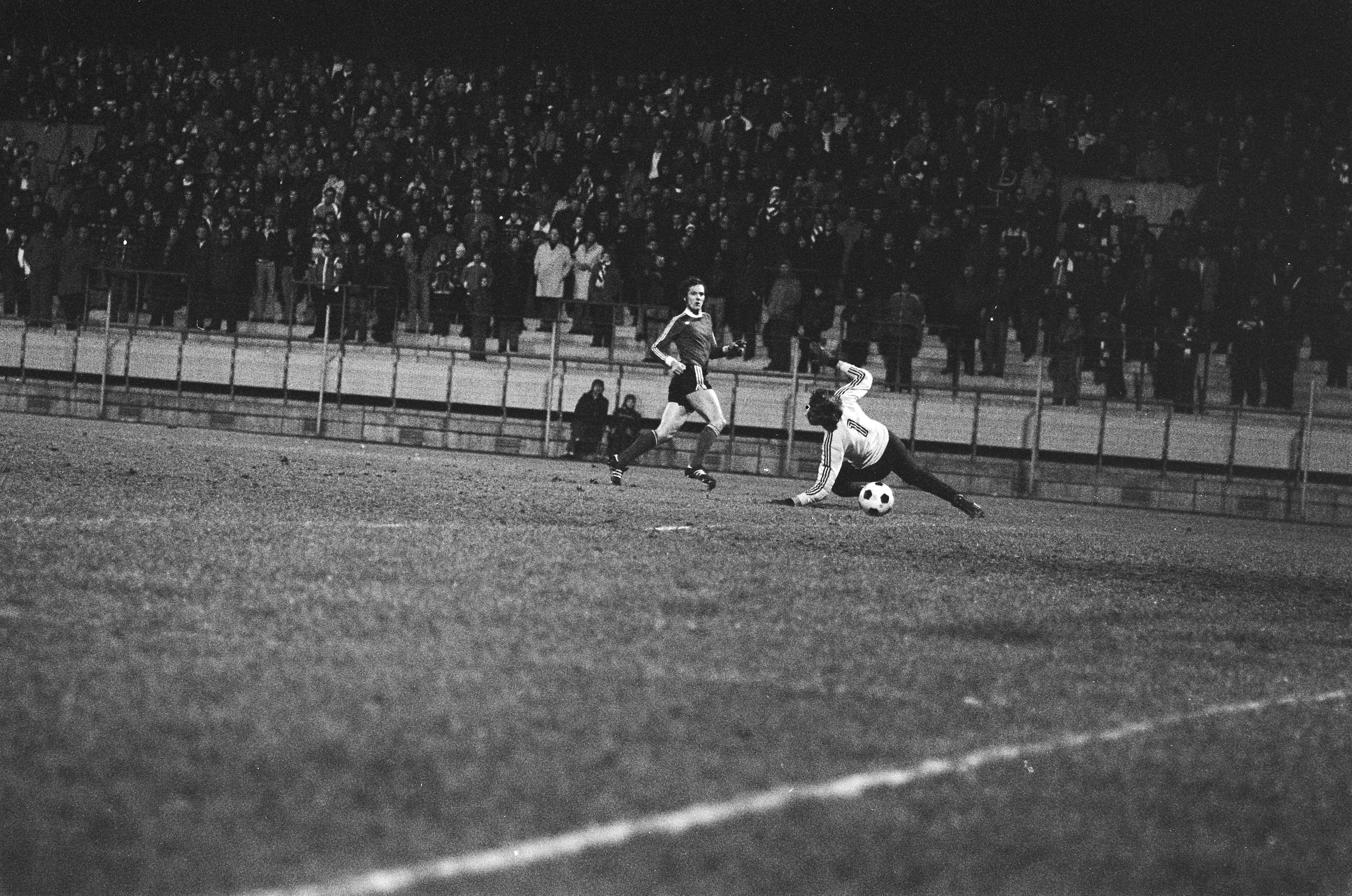
- Deacy (left) scoring against goalkeeper Nico van Zoghel

Personal information
- Full name: Nicholas Simon Deacy
- Date of birth: 19 July 1953 (age 73)
- Place of birth: Cardiff, Wales
- Position: Striker

Senior career*
| Years | Team | Apps | (Gls) |
| 1971–1974 | Merthyr Tydfil | | |
| 1974–1975 | Hereford United | 17 | (2) |
| 1974 | → Workington (loan) | 5 | (1) |
| 1975–1978 | PSV Eindhoven | 52 | (8) |
| 1978–1979 | Beringen | 42 | (10) |
| 1979–1980 | Vitesse Arnhem | 9 | (0) |
| 1980–1982 | Hull City | 87 | (7) |
| 1982–1983 | Happy Valley | 25 | (3) |
| 1983–1984 | Bury | 31 | (0) |
| 1984 | Merthyr Tydfil | | |
| 1984–1985 | Swansea City | 0 | (0) |
| 1985–1986 | Double Flower | 26 | (6) |
| 1986–1987 | Ebbw Vale | | |
| 1987–1988 | Barry Town | | |
| Total | | 243 | (28) |

International career
| 1977–1978 | Wales | 12 | (4) |
- * Club domestic league appearances and goals

Nick Deacy (born 19 July 1953) is a Welsh former professional footballer who played as a striker.

== Career ==
He played for PSV Eindhoven, and won the UEFA Cup with them in 1978, coming on as a substitute in the second leg of the final.

After a spell with Vitesse Arnhem he signed for Hull City in 1980 and made 87 Football League appearances for them.

He was capped on 12 occasions by the Wales national team, and he scored on his debut for them against European champions Czechoslovakia in March 1977.
