= Bill Calder =

Scottish footballer (1934–2021)

Personal information
- Full name: William Carson Calder
- Date of birth: 28 September 1934
- Place of birth: Greenock, Scotland
- Date of death: 10 November 2021 (aged 87)
- Place of death: Ramsbottom, England
- Position: Forward

Senior career*
Years	Team	Apps	(Gls)
1955–1959	Leicester City	3	(0)
1959–1963	Bury	174	(67)
1963–1966	Oxford United	67	(28)
1966–1967	Rochdale	8	(1)
1967–1968	Macclesfield Town	22	(9)
- * Club domestic league appearances and goals

William Carson Calder (28 September 1934 – 10 November 2021) was a Scottish footballer who played for Oxford United, Leicester City, Bury and Rochdale. Originally a midfielder, Calder was converted to a forward while playing for Bury.

Leicester City signed Calder from Port Glasgow Rovers in 1956. Calder transferred from Leicester City to Bury after three League appearances for Leicester City in Division 1. He played as right-winger for Bury, and won promotion with Bury to Division 2 in 1960–1961. Calder scored 21 goals that season, was ever present, and won a Division 3 champions medal. He then played more as a center forward. He moved to Oxford United for £8,500 from in November 1963, and then to Rochdale in 1966.

Calder died in Ramsbottom on 10 November 2021, at the age of 87.
