= Peter Hooper (footballer) =

English footballer (1933–2011)

Personal information
- Date of birth: 2 February 1933
- Place of birth: Teignmouth, England
- Date of death: 13 August 2011 (aged 78)
- Place of death: Barnstaple, England
- Position: Outside left

Senior career*
Years	Team	Apps	(Gls)
????–1953	Dawlish Town		
1953–1962	Bristol Rovers	297	(101)
1962–1963	Cardiff City	40	(22)
1963–1966	Bristol City	54	(14)
1966–????	Worcester City		

International career
1951	Kenya	1	(3)
- * Club domestic league appearances and goals

Peter Hooper (2 February 1933 – 13 August 2011) was a professional footballer, who played for Bristol Rovers, Cardiff City and Bristol City in the Football League.

Born in Teignmouth, he was an outside left with a thunderous shot, especially from free kicks.

Although a proud Devonian, Hooper made one appearance for the Kenyan national team against Uganda in 1951 while on national service in the country.

He first caught the eye of Bristol Rovers scouts in 1953 while playing for Dawlish Town and made his Football League debut in March 1954.

Between October 1957 and August 1961 he appeared in 163 consecutive matches.

By the time he left to join Cardiff City, he had played 297 games for Rovers in the old Second Division – the equivalent of today's Championship – scoring 101 goals, thus becoming one of only six players to score more than 100 goals for the club.

After one season with Cardiff, he had a spell with Bristol City.

When his career was ended in 1966 by a bout of peritonitis he moved to North Devon where he played non-league football for Barnstaple Town.

After retiring from professional football, Hooper was landlord of The Three Pigeons in Bishops Tawton, where he lived, before spending 19 years as a probation assistant in Barnstaple.
