= Peter Davies (footballer, born 1936) =

Welsh footballer (1936–2023)

Personal information
- Full name: Peter Davies
- Date of birth: 8 March 1936
- Place of birth: Llanelli, Wales
- Date of death: 25 January 2023 (aged 86)
- Height: 5 ft 9 in (1.75 m)
- Position: Wing half

Senior career*
| Years | Team | Apps | (Gls) |
| –1957 | Llanelly | | |
| | Arsenal | 2 | (1) |
| 1954-1955 | Swansea Town | 134 | (5) |
| 1965–1966 | Brighton & Hove Albion | 6 | (0) |
| 1966 | Merthyr Tydfil | | |
| 1966–19?? | Germiston Callies | | |
- * Club domestic league appearances and goals

Peter Davies (8 March 1936 – 25 January 2023) was a Welsh professional footballer who played as a wing half. He made 140 appearances in the Football League for Swansea Town and Brighton & Hove Albion. He began his career with Llanelly in the Southern League before joining Arsenal. After two years and no appearances, he returned Wales with Swansea Town where he spent six seasons. After brief spells with Brighton & Hove Albion and Merthyr Tydfil, he went to South Africa to play for Germiston Callies where he then got injured and was forced to retire. Davies died on 25 January 2023, at the age of 86.
