= Alan McIntosh =

Welsh footballer

Personal information
- Full name: Alan McIntosh
- Date of birth: 29 July 1939 (age 87)
- Place of birth: Llandudno, Wales
- Position: Outside forward

Senior career*
Years	Team	Apps	(Gls)
–1962	Llandudno		
1961–1963	Cardiff City	64	(11)

International career
1958–1962	Wales Amateurs	10	(2)
- * Club domestic league appearances and goals

Alan McIntosh (born 29 July 1939) was a Welsh amateur footballer who played as an outside forward in the Football League for Cardiff City. He was capped by Wales at amateur level.
