= Alan Harrington =

Welsh footballer (1933–2019)

Personal information
- Full name: Alan Charles Harrington
- Date of birth: 17 November 1933
- Place of birth: Penarth, Wales
- Date of death: 23 December 2019 (aged 86)
- Position: Defender

Senior career*
Years	Team	Apps	(Gls)
1951–1966	Cardiff City	348	(6)

International career
1956–1961	Wales	11	(0)
- * Club domestic league appearances and goals

Alan Charles Harrington (17 November 1933 – 23 December 2019) was a Welsh professional footballer and Wales international. Harrington played his entire professional career at Cardiff City where he is regarded as one of the club's all-time greats.

== Career ==
Born in Penarth, Harrington joined Cardiff City from local side Cardiff Nomads in 1951. He made his debut midway through the following season in a 0–0 draw with Tottenham Hotspur. He went on to hold a position in the first-team squad for the next twelve years, although he missed the entire 1963–64 season due to a broken leg.

He was forced to retire from playing after suffering a second broken leg during a 1–1 against Leyton Orient in January 1966. In later years, Harrington managed Barry Town, steering them to the Welsh Football League championship in 1982–83.

In November 2007 he was awarded an FAW merit award.
