= Cliff Jones (Welsh footballer) =

Welsh footballer (born 1935)

Cliff Jones MBE
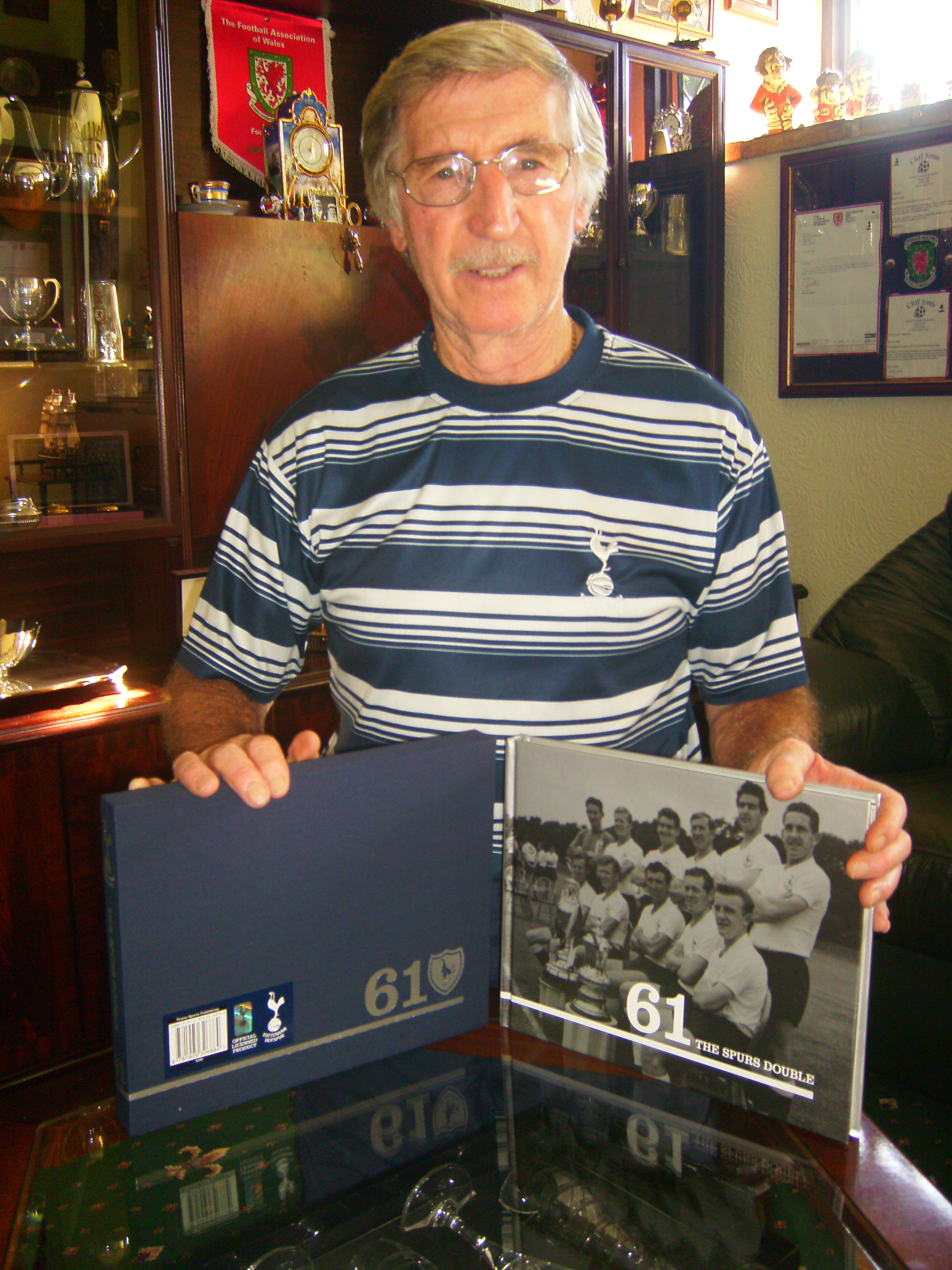
- Jones in 2010

Personal information
- Full name: Clifford William Jones
- Date of birth: 7 February 1935 (age 91)
- Place of birth: Swansea, Wales
- Position: Winger

Senior career*
Years	Team	Apps	(Gls)
1952–1958	Swansea Town	168	(47)
1958–1968	Tottenham Hotspur	318	(135)
1968–1970	Fulham	25	(2)
1970–1971	King's Lynn		
1971	Bedford Town		
Total		511	(184)

International career
1954–1969	Wales	59	(16)
- * Club domestic league appearances and goals

Clifford William Jones MBE (born 7 February 1935) is a Welsh former footballer. During his career, he played as a winger and was a crucial member of Tottenham Hotspur's 1960–61 double-winning side. He is now the last surviving player from the Welsh team in the 1958 World Cup.

== Early life ==
Jones was born on 7 February 1935 in Swansea, Glamorgan, to a footballing family. His father Ivor; uncles Shoni, Emlyn, Bryn and Bert; brother Bryn; and cousin Ken were also all players. He was also a schoolboy friend of Terry Medwin, who would later become his teammate at Tottenham Hotspur. He was brought up in the Sandfields area of Swansea, and attended St. Helens Mixed Junior School. When he was eleven, he attended Oxford Street Secondary Modern, where he joined the school's football team. When he was twelve, he was selected for the Swansea Schoolboys team, which he captained in 1950 and won the Welsh Shield and English Schools Trophy.

== Club career ==
=== Swansea Town ===
Jones was signed to Billy McCandless' Swansea Town in 1952 when he was 17, joining his brother Bryn who also played for the club. For a time at Swansea he also worked as an apprentice sheet metal worker in The Prince of Wales Dry Dock. He made his debut in the League match against Bury in October 1952. He scored his first goal in the match against Leeds United two games later. He started off as an inside forward, but moved to the left wing in the 1953–54 season. He scored 47 goals in 168 league appearances for the club. and 54 goal in 193 appearances in all competitions.

=== Tottenham Hotspur ===
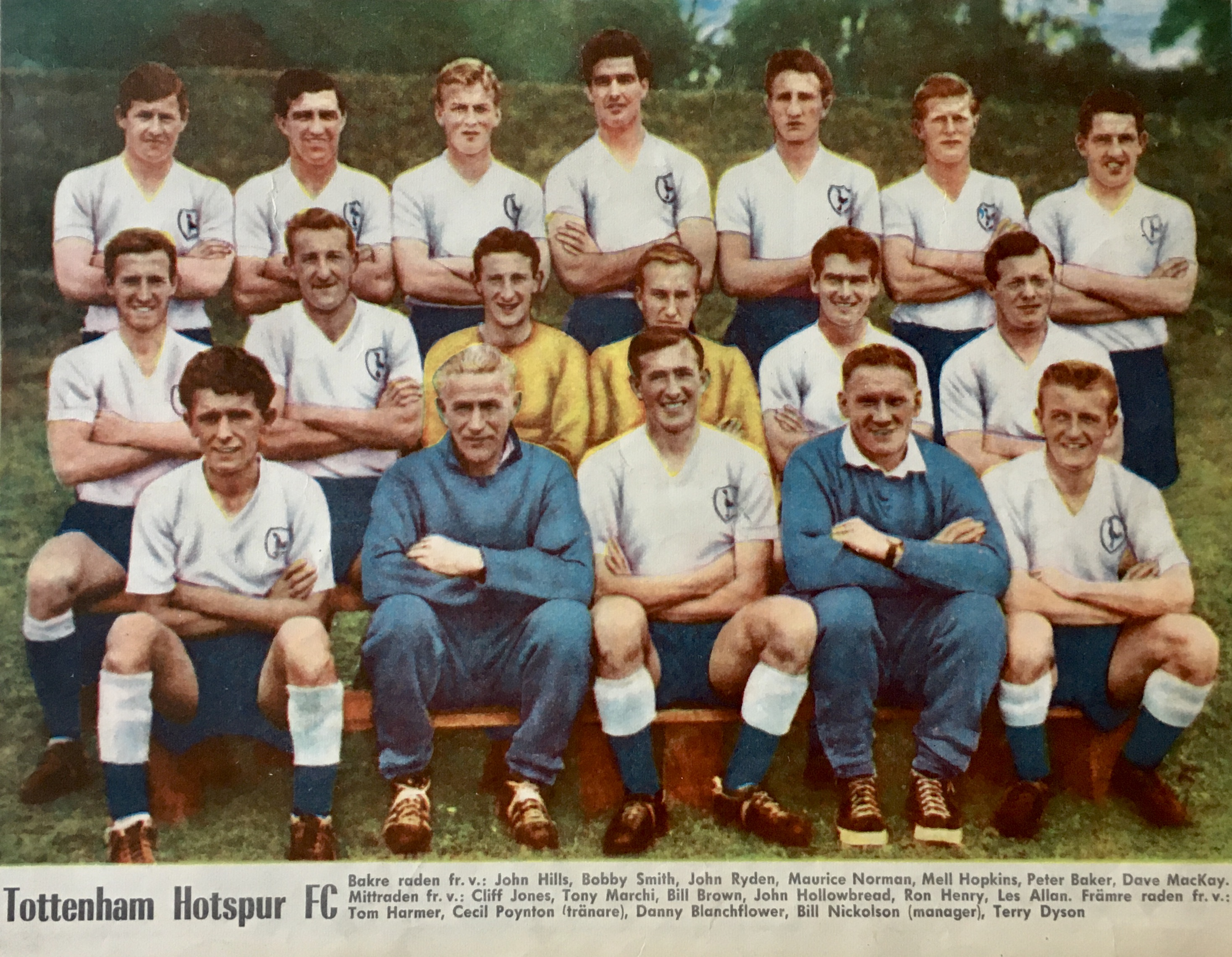
Tottenham Hotspur in 1960; Jones on far left in middle row.

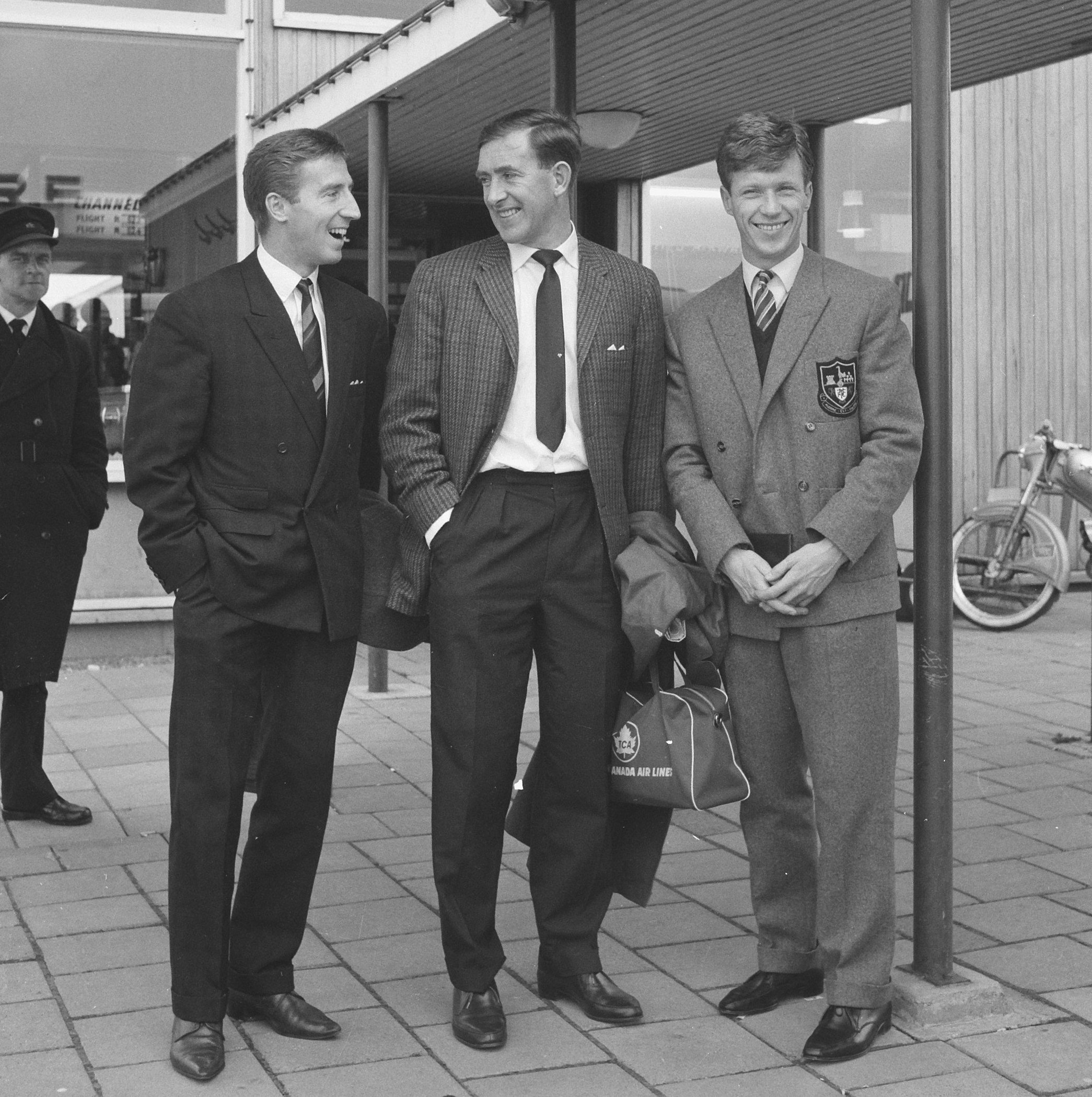
Jones (left) with Danny Blanchflower and John White in Rotterdam in 1961

Jones joined Tottenham Hotspur in February 1958 for a record £35,000 (equivalent to £712,644 in 2025). He made his debut for the club on 22 February 1958 in the away match against Arsenal at Highbury. For a while Jones didn't play at his best at Spurs, and he then broke a leg in a tackle with Peter Baker during pre-season training in the summer of 1958. He returned to the team after his recovery in December 1958. He became a prolific goalscorer for the club, scoring 25 goals in all appearances in the 1959–60 season.

Jones was a key member of the double-winning team of the 1960–61 season, scoring 19 goals that season. He was also part of the successful Spurs sides in the 1962 FA Cup Final and 1963 European Cup Winners Cup Final, and he also won a further medal as a non-playing substitute in the 1967 FA Cup Final. In 1962, Juventus offered a world-record fee of £125,000 (equivalent to £2,333,061 in 2025) to sign him but the offer was turned down. Jones played on both wings at Tottenham; he played on the right wing in the Double-winning season, and on the left in the subsequent seasons. He made his final appearance and scored his last goal for Tottenham in the match against Manchester United on 9 October 1968. He remains one of the top scorers in the club's history, scoring 159 goals in 378 games (135 in 318 league games).

=== Fulham and non-league ===
Jones finally moved on from White Hart Lane in 1968 in order to take up a position with Fulham for two seasons. He scored twice in 25 league appearances for Fulham. Afterwards, he played for King's Lynn. He made his debut for King's Lynn on 15 August 1970 against Romford with his final game for the club against Dover Athletic making a total of 27 appearances and scoring 13 goals. Jones then moved on and played for Bedford Town, Wealdstone, Cambridge City then Wingate.

== International career ==
Jones was called into the Welsh national side after playing only 25 times as a winger for Swansea. He made his senior debut playing against Austria in May 1954. In his second appearance for the national side on 22 October 1955, he helped Wales beat England 2–1 at Ninian Park, scoring the winning goal.

Jones scored three goals in the 1958 FIFA World Cup play-off in February 1958 against Israel to win 4–0 on aggregate, allowing Wales to qualify for the World Cup for the first time. He played in all five of Wales' games at the 1958 World Cup, and helped Wales reach the quarter-final where they lost to Brazil, beaten by a goal from Pelé. He made a total of 11 appearances for them in World Cup qualifiers between 1957 and 1968. He played his final game for Wales in October 1968 in the World Cup qualifier against Italy. In total he played 59 times for Wales in 15 years, scoring 16 goals.

== Personal life ==
Jones married his wife Joan in 1955 and they have four children, nine grandchildren and seventeen great-grandchildren. Among Jones' grandsons are former footballer Scott Neilson and football coach Matt Wells.

After retiring from football, Jones taught PE and managed the school football team at Highbury Grove School in North London for 29 years, retiring in December 2000. In February 2025 he celebrated his 90th birthday at the Tottenham Stadium.

Jones has been inducted into the Tottenham Hotspur Hall of Fame as well as the National Football Museum's Hall of Fame. He was also inducted onto the Supporters' Trust Wall of Fame outside the Liberty Stadium. He received an Honorary Fellowship from the University of Wales.

== Honours ==
Tottenham Hotspur

- Football League First Division: 1960–61
- FA Cup: 1960–61, 1961–62, 1966–67
- FA Charity Shield: 1961, 1962, 1967 (shared)
- European Cup Winner's Cup: 1962–63

Wales

- British Home Championship: 1955–56 (shared), 1959–60 (shared)
