= Ken Jones (Welsh footballer, born 1936) =

Welsh footballer

Personal information
- Full name: Kenneth Jones
- Date of birth: 2 January 1936
- Place of birth: Aberdare, Wales
- Date of death: 18 January 2013 (aged 77)
- Place of death: Spain
- Position: Goalkeeper

Senior career*
Years	Team	Apps	(Gls)
1957–1958	Cardiff City	24	(0)
1958–1964	Scunthorpe United	168	(0)
1964–1966	Charlton Athletic	25	(0)
1966–1967	Exeter City	17	(0)
1967–1970	Yeovil Town	?	(0)
Total		234+	(0)
- * Club domestic league appearances and goals

Kenneth Jones (2 January 1936 – 18 January 2013) was a Welsh professional footballer. A goalkeeper, he was part of the Wales squad for the 1958 FIFA World Cup in Sweden.

== Career ==
Jones began his career at Cardiff City, developing a reputation for his long goal kicks which would often reach the opposition goal. After losing his place in the first team to Ron Nicholls, he moved to Scunthorpe United in December 1958 where he went on to spend the majority of his career at the club. In 1959, while still a Scunthorpe player, he received a single vote for the Ballon d'Or, the prize for the best footballer in Europe. After leaving the club in 1964, he had spells at Charlton Athletic and Exeter City before moving into non-league with Yeovil Town. During one match for Yeovil in 1968, he was once substituted after conceding 5 goals in 11 minutes.

In November 2009, Jones was honoured with a long service award by the Football Association of Wales.

Jones died at the age of 77 on 18 January 2013, presumably of natural causes.
