= 1968–69 Cardiff City F.C. season =

Welsh football club season

Cardiff City
1968–69 season
- Chairman: Fred Dewey
- Manager: Jimmy Scoular
- Football League Second Division: 5th
- FA Cup: 3rd round
- League Cup: 2nd round
- European Cup Winners Cup: 1st round
- Welsh Cup: Winners
- Top goalscorer: League: John Toshack (22); All: John Toshack (31)
- Highest home attendance: 26,210 (v Bristol City, 25 January 1969)
- Lowest home attendance: 10,809 (v Carlisle United, 21 September 1968)
- Average home league attendance: 16,870
Home colours

The 1968–69 season was Cardiff City F.C.'s 42nd season in the Football League. They competed in the 22-team Division Two, then the second tier of English football, finishing fifth.

The team enjoyed nearly no success in cup competitions as they were knocked out in their first match of every cup apart from the Welsh Cup which they went on to win by beating local rivals Swansea Town in the final.

John Toshack would go on to finish the season with a total of 31 goals in all competitions, equalling the record set by Hughie Ferguson in the 1926–27 season that would not be beaten until 2003 when Robert Earnshaw finished with a total of 35 goals.

== Players ==
Note: Flags indicate national team as defined under FIFA eligibility rules; some limited exceptions apply. Players may hold more than one non-FIFA nationality.

No.	Pos.	Nation	Player
--	GK	ENG	Fred Davies
--	DF	ENG	Gary Bell
--	DF	ENG	David Carver
--	DF	WAL	Graham Coldrick
--	DF	WAL	Steve Derrett
--	DF	ENG	Bobby Ferguson
--	DF	WAL	Terry Lewis
--	DF	WAL	Richie Morgan
--	DF	SCO	Don Murray
--	MF	ENG	Ronnie Bird
--	MF	SCO	Malcolm Clarke

No.	Pos.	Nation	Player
--	MF	ENG	Brian Harris
--	MF	WAL	Barrie Jones
--	MF	ENG	Peter King
--	MF	ENG	Leslie Lea
--	MF	WAL	Leighton Phillips
--	MF	SCO	Frank Sharp
--	MF	WAL	Mel Sutton
--	FW	SCO	Sandy Allan
--	FW	ENG	Brian Clark
--	FW	ENG	Norman Dean
--	FW	WAL	John Toshack

== League standings ==
Pos	Team	Pld	W	D	L	GF	GA	GAv	Pts	Qualification or relegation
3	Charlton Athletic	42	18	14	10	61	52	1.173	50	
4	Middlesbrough	42	19	11	12	58	49	1.184	49	
5	Cardiff City	42	20	7	15	67	54	1.241	47	Qualification for the Cup Winners' Cup first round (Note: Cardiff City qualified for the European Cup Winners' Cup as the 1968–69 Welsh Cup winners.)
6	Huddersfield Town	42	17	12	13	53	46	1.152	46	
7	Birmingham City	42	18	8	16	73	59	1.237	44	

Rules for classification: 1) Points; 2) Goal average; 3) Goals scored

=== Results by round ===
Round	1	2	3	4	5	6	7	8	9	10	11	12	13	14	15	16	17	18	19	20	21	22	23	24	25	26	27	28	29	30	31	32	33	34	35	36	37	38	39	40	41	42
Ground	H	H	A	A	H	H	A	H	A	H	A	H	A	A	H	A	H	A	H	A	H	A	H	A	A	H	A	H	A	H	H	A	H	A	A	H	H	A	A	H	A	H
Result	L	L	L	D	W	W	W	W	L	W	W	D	L	L	L	D	W	W	D	W	W	W	W	W	L	W	L	W	L	W	W	L	W	D	W	D	L	D	L	W	L	L
Position			22	22	16	13	9	6	11	10	6	6	6	13	14	14	11	10	10	9	7	5	3	3	3	2	2	2	4	2	2	3	3	3	2	3	4	4	5	4	5	5
Points	0	0	0	1	3	5	7	9	9	11	13	14	14	14	14	15	17	19	20	22	24	26	28	30	30	32	32	34	34	36	38	38	40	41	43	44	44	45	45	47	47	47

Source: Competitive matches
A = Away; H = Home; W = Win; D = Draw; L = Loss

== Fixtures and results ==
=== Second Division ===
10 August 1968 1	Cardiff City	0 – 4	Crystal Palace	Cardiff
15:00			6' Mel Blyth; 35', 48' Cliff Jackson; 70' David Payne	Stadium: Ninian Park; Attendance: 16,373; Referee: Eric Jennings (Stourbridge)

14 August 1968 2	Cardiff City	0 – 1	Charlton Athletic	Cardiff
19:30			10' Matt Tees	Stadium: Ninian Park; Attendance: 11,979; Referee: Dennis Corbett (Essington, Nr Wolverhampton)

17 August 1968 3	Norwich City	3 – 1	Cardiff City	Norwich
15:00	Hugh Curran 27', 66'; John Manning 89'		13' Ronnie Bird	Stadium: Carrow Road; Attendance: 14,476

21 August 1968 4	Bury	3 – 3	Cardiff City	Bury
19:30	Greg Farrell (?); Ray Parry		Brian Clark; Barrie Jones; John Toshack	Stadium: Gigg Lane; Attendance: 7,214

24 August 1968 5	Cardiff City	1 – 0	Preston North End	Cardiff
15:00	Peter King			Stadium: Ninian Park; Attendance: 10,817; Referee: Harry New (Portsmouth)

28 August 1968 6	Cardiff City	4 – 0	Birmingham City	Cardiff
19:30	John Toshack; John Toshack; Gary Bell; Brian Clark			Stadium: Ninian Park; Attendance: 14,967

31 August 1968 7	Portsmouth	1 – 3	Cardiff City	Portsmouth
15:00	Mike Trebilcock (pen.)		Brian Clark; Peter King; John Toshack	Stadium: Fratton Park; Attendance: 21,871

7 September 1968 8	Cardiff City	2 – 0	Middlesbrough	Cardiff
15:00	Bill Gates (o.g.); Brian Clark			Stadium: Ninian Park; Attendance: 14,225

14 September 1968 9	Huddersfield Town	3 – 0	Cardiff City	Huddersfield
15:00	Frank Worthington; Frank Worthington; Colin Dobson			Stadium: Leeds Road; Attendance: 7,523

21 September 1968 10	Cardiff City	2 – 1	Carlisle United	Cardiff
15:00	Brian Clark 40'; Barrie Jones 41'		30' George McVitie	Stadium: Ninian Park; Attendance: 10,809

28 September 1968 11	Bristol City	0 – 3	Cardiff City	Bristol
15:00			65' Peter King; 73' John Toshack; 78' Barrie Jones	Stadium: Ashton Gate; Attendance: 20,632; Referee: John Gow (Swansea)

5 October 1968 12	Cardiff City	1 – 1	Aston Villa	Cardiff
15:00	John Toshack 44'		71' Brian Godfrey	Stadium: Ninian Park; Attendance: 17,113; Referee: John Homewood (Sunbury-On-Thames)

8 October 1968 13	Birmingham	2 – 0	Cardiff City	Birmingham
19:30	Jimmy Greenhoff; Johnny Vincent			Stadium: St Andrew's; Attendance: 28,298

12 October 1968 14	Millwall	2 – 0	Cardiff City	London
15:00	Billy Neil (footballer, born 1944) 42'; Derek Possee 60'			Stadium: The Den; Attendance: 13,893; Referee: RL Johnson (Lowestoft)

19 October 1968 15	Cardiff City	0 – 2	Bolton Wanderers	Cardiff
15:00			42' Terry Wharton; 83' Gordon Taylor	Stadium: Ninian Park; Attendance: 12,026; Referee: Jim Finney (Hereford)

26 October 1968 16	Hull City	3 – 3	Cardiff City	Hull
15:00	Ken Wagstaff 27', 44', 76'		22', 82' John Toshack; 75' Brian Clark	Stadium: Boothferry Park; Attendance: 17,027; Referee: Roger Kirkpatrick (Leicester)

2 November 1968 17	Cardiff City	2 – 1	Blackburn Rovers	Cardiff
15:00	John Toshack 7'; Ronnie Bird 57'		79' Don Martin	Stadium: Ninian Park; Attendance: 11,672; Referee: Ken Wynn (Wolverhampton)

9 November 1968 18	Blackpool	1 – 2	Cardiff City	Blackpool
15:00	Tommy Hutchison 39'		65', 71' John Toshack	Stadium: Bloomfield Road; Attendance: 12,085

16 November 1968 19	Cardiff City	1 – 1	Derby County	Cardiff
15:00	Brian Clark 73'		79' Alan Durban	Stadium: Ninian Park; Attendance: 17,328; Referee: Ken Burns (Stourbridge)

23 November 1968 20	Oxford United	0 – 2	Cardiff City	Oxford
15:00			22' Brian Clark; 83' John Toshack	Stadium: Manor Ground; Attendance: 9,836; Referee: Keith Walker (Maidstone)

30 November 1968 21	Cardiff City	4 – 1	Sheffield United	Cardiff
15:00	Ronnie Bird 5', 82' (pen.); Brian Clark 42'; John Toshack		90' Colin Addison	Stadium: Ninian Park; Attendance: 14,255; Referee: John Yates (Redditch)

7 December 1968 22	Fulham	1 – 5	Cardiff City	London
15:00	Les Barrett 32'		34' Brian Clark; 40', 85' Barrie Jones; 56' John Toshack; 60' Leslie Lea	Stadium: Craven Cottage; Attendance: 13,191; Referee: Norman Burtenshaw (Great Yarmouth)

14 December 1968 23	Cardiff City	2 – 0	Millwall	Cardiff
15:00	John Toshack; Brian Clark			Stadium: Ninian Park; Attendance: 22,405

21 December 1968 24	Bolton Wanderers	1 – 2	Cardiff City	Bolton
15:00	Terry Wharton 85'		22' Ronnie Bird; 63' Barrie Jones	Stadium: Burnden Park; Attendance: 8,895

26 December 1968 25	Aston Villa	2 – 0	Cardiff City	Birmingham
15:00	Barrie Hole; Brian Tiler			Stadium: Villa Park; Attendance: 41,296; Referee: Malcolm Sinclair (Guildford)

28 December 1968 26	Cardiff City	3 – 0	Hull City	Cardiff
15:00	Brian Clark; Ronnie Bird; John Toshack			Stadium: Ninian Park; Attendance: 24,815

11 January 1969 27	Blackburn Rovers	1 – 0	Cardiff City	Blackburn
15:00	John Connelly 68'			Stadium: Ewood Park; Attendance: 12,100; Referee: Keith Styles (Barnsley)

25 January 1969 28	Cardiff City	3 – 0	Bristol City	Cardiff
15:00	Brian Clark 18', 45'; Peter King			Stadium: Ninian Park; Attendance: 26,210; Referee: Harry New (Hampshire)

1 February 1969 29	Derby County	2 – 0	Cardiff City	Derby
15:00	Kevin Hector (?)			Stadium: Baseball Ground; Attendance: 34,589

8 February 1969 30	Cardiff City	5 – 0	Oxford United	Cardiff
15:00	Ronnie Bird; Brian Clark; Brian Clark; John Toshack; John Toshack			Stadium: Ninian Park; Attendance: 16,387; Referee: Bill Castle (Dudley)

12 February 1969 31	Cardiff City	1 – 0	Blackpool	Cardiff
19:30	John Toshack			Stadium: Ninian Park; Attendance: 24,206; Referee: Derek Nippard (Bournemouth)

1 March 1969 32	Crystal Palace	3 – 1	Cardiff City	London
15:00	Mel Blyth; Steve Kember; Tony Taylor		Barrie Jones	Stadium: Selhurst Park; Attendance: 19,663; Referee: Charles Nicholls (Plymouth)

7 March 1969 33	Cardiff City	3 – 1	Norwich City	Cardiff
19:30	John Toshack; Peter King; Ronnie Bird		John Manning	Stadium: Ninian Park; Attendance: 21,389

11 March 1969 34	Sheffield United	2 – 2	Cardiff City	Sheffield
19:30	Gil Reece (?)		12' Brian Clark; Barrie Jones	Stadium: Bramall Lane; Attendance: 14,508; Referee: Ivan Robinson (Manchester)

15 March 1969 35	Preston North End	0 – 1	Cardiff City	Preston
15:00			Ronnie Bird	Stadium: Deepdale; Attendance: 10,752

21 March 1969 36	Cardiff City	2 – 2	Portsmouth	Cardiff
19:30	John Toshack; John Toshack		Albert McCann (o.g.) David Carver	Stadium: Ninian Park; Attendance: 21,791; Referee: Ken Burns (Stourbridge)

25 March 1969 37	Cardiff City	0 – 2	Fulham	Cardiff
19:30			Brian Dear; Brian Dear	Stadium: Ninian Park; Attendance: 20,723; Referee: Mike Kerkhof (Bicester)

29 March 1969 38	Middlesbrough	0 – 0	Cardiff City	Middlesbrough
15:00				Stadium: Ayresome Park; Attendance: 24,470; Referee: Bob Matthewson (Manchester)

4 April 1969 39	Charlton Athletic	4 – 1	Cardiff City	London
11:00	Matt Tees 17', 29'; Harry Gregory 19'; Graham Moore 40'		85' Don Murray	Stadium: The Valley; Attendance: 21,832; Referee: Jack Taylor (Wolverhampton)

7 April 1969 40	Cardiff City	2 – 0	Bury	Cardiff
15:00	John Toshack; Sandy Allan			Stadium: Ninian Park; Attendance: 13,232; Referee: Charles Nicholls (Plymouth)

12 April 1969 41	Carlisle United	1 – 0	Cardiff City	Carlisle
15:00	Hugh McIlmoyle 1'			Stadium: Brunton Park; Attendance: 5,546; Referee: Alan Green

19 April 1969 42	Cardiff City	0 – 2	Huddersfield Town	Cardiff
15:00			82' Trevor Cherry; 84' (o.g.) Don Murray	Stadium: Ninian Park; Attendance: 11,549; Referee: Eric Jennings (Stourbridge)

=== League Cup ===
4 September 1968 Round 2	Carlisle United	2 – 0	Cardiff City	Carlisle
	Frank Barton; Hugh McIlmoyle			Stadium: Brunton Park; Attendance: 7,714

=== FA Cup ===
4 January 1969 Round 3	Cardiff City	0 – 0	Arsenal	Cardiff
15:00				Stadium: Ninian Park; Attendance: 55,136; Referee: David Smith (Stonehouse)

7 January 1969 Round 3 (Replay)	Arsenal	2 – 0	Cardiff City	London
19:30	George Armstrong; Bobby Gould			Stadium: Highbury; Attendance: 52,681; Referee: David Smith (Stonehouse)

=== European Cup Winners Cup ===
18 September 1968 Round 1 (First Leg)	Cardiff City	2 – 2	FC Porto	Cardiff
19:30	John Toshack 24'; Ronnie Bird 50' (pen.)		60', 68' Custodio Pinto	Stadium: Ninian Park; Attendance: 19,202; Referee: Gaspar Pintado Viu (Spain)

2 October 1968 Round 1 (Second Leg)	FC Porto	2 – 1 (4 – 3 agg.)	Cardiff City	Porto
	9' Pavao; 76' Custodio Pinto		51' John Toshack	Stadium: Estadio das Antas; Attendance: 55,000; Referee: Robert Helies (France)

=== Welsh Cup ===
15 January 1969 Round 3	Aberystwyth Town	0 – 3	Cardiff City	Aberystwyth
15:00			Leslie Lea; John Toshack; Barrie Jones	Stadium: Park Avenue, Aberystwyth; Attendance: 5,000

5 February 1969 Round 4	Cardiff City	6 – 0	Bethesda Athletic	Cardiff
19:30	Brian Clark; Brian Clark; Barrie Jones; Gary Bell; John Toshack			Stadium: Ninian Park; Attendance: 6,749

19 March 1969 Semi Final	Chester	0 – 2	Cardiff City	Chester
19:15			John Toshack; John Toshack	Stadium: Sealand Road; Attendance: 8,404

22 April 1969 Final (First Leg)	Swansea Town	1 – 3	Cardiff City	Swansea
19:30	Herbie Williams 50'		13', 44' John Toshack; 18' (o.g.) Mel Nurse	Stadium: Vetch Field; Attendance: 10,207; Referee: Leo Callaghan (Merthyr Tydfil)

29 April 1969 Final (Second Leg)	Cardiff City	2 – 0 (5 – 1 agg.)	Swansea Town	Cardiff
19:30	John Toshack 33'; Leslie Lea 40'			Stadium: Ninian Park; Attendance: 12,617; Referee: Leo Callaghan (Merthyr Tydfil)

== See also ==
- List of Cardiff City F.C. seasons
