= 1969–70 Cardiff City F.C. season =

Welsh football club season

Cardiff City
1969–70 season
- Chairman: Fred Dewey
- Manager: Jimmy Scoular
- Football League Second Division: 7th
- FA Cup: 3rd round
- League Cup: 2nd round
- European Cup Winners Cup: 2nd round
- Welsh Cup: Winners
- Top goalscorer: League: Brian Clark (18); All: Brian Clark (28)
- Highest home attendance: 30,083 (v QPR, 27 September 1969)
- Lowest home attendance: 8,436 (v Millwall, 15 April 1970)
- Average home league attendance: 21,486
Home colours

The 1969–70 season was Cardiff City F.C.'s 43rd season in the Football League. They competed in the 22-team Division Two, then the second tier of English football, finishing seventh.

The season saw also saw them win the Welsh Cup, beating Chester City in the final, although they enjoyed little success in other tournaments, being knocked out of both the FA Cup and League Cup in their first matches.

== Players ==
Note: Flags indicate national team as defined under FIFA eligibility rules; some limited exceptions apply. Players may hold more than one non-FIFA nationality.

No.	Pos.	Nation	Player
--	GK	ENG	Fred Davies
--	GK	SCO	Jim Eadie
--	DF	ENG	Gary Bell
--	DF	ENG	David Carver
--	DF	WAL	Graham Coldrick
--	DF	WAL	Steve Derrett
--	DF	WAL	Terry Lewis
--	DF	SCO	Don Murray
--	MF	ENG	Ronnie Bird
--	MF	ENG	Brian Harris
--	MF	WAL	Barrie Jones

No.	Pos.	Nation	Player
--	MF	ENG	Peter King
--	MF	ENG	Leslie Lea
--	MF	WAL	Leighton Phillips
--	MF	SCO	Frank Sharp
--	MF	WAL	Bob Summerhayes
--	MF	WAL	Mel Sutton
--	MF	ENG	Bobby Woodruff
--	FW	SCO	Sandy Allan
--	FW	ENG	Brian Clark
--	FW	WAL	John Toshack

== League standings ==
Pos	Team	Pld	W	D	L	GF	GA	GAv	Pts	Qualification or relegation
5	Swindon Town	42	17	16	9	57	47	1.213	50	
6	Sheffield United	42	22	5	15	73	38	1.921	49	Qualification for the Watney Cup (Note: Sheffield United and Hull City qualified for the Watney Cup as the two teams with the most goals that hadn't already qualified for promotion or a European competition.)
7	Cardiff City	42	18	13	11	61	41	1.488	49	Qualification for the Cup Winners' Cup first round (Note: Cardiff City qualified for the European Cup Winners' Cup as the 1969-70 Welsh Cup winners.)
8	Blackburn Rovers	42	20	7	15	54	50	1.080	47	
9	Queens Park Rangers	42	17	11	14	66	57	1.158	45	

Rules for classification: 1) Points; 2) Goal average; 3) Goals scored

=== Results by round ===
Round	1	2	3	4	5	6	7	8	9	10	11	12	13	14	15	16	17	18	19	20	21	22	23	24	25	26	27	28	29	30	31	32	33	34	35	36	37	38	39	40	41	42
Ground	A	H	H	A	A	H	H	A	H	A	H	A	A	H	H	A	H	A	A	H	H	A	A	H	H	H	A	A	H	A	H	H	A	H	A	A	H	H	A	A	H	A
Result	W	D	D	L	W	W	W	D	D	L	W	L	L	W	L	D	W	L	D	W	W	W	W	W	W	W	L	L	D	D	D	W	D	L	W	L	W	D	D	L	D	W
Position			4	7	6	4	2	4	4	6	6	7	7	7	10	9	9	10	9	9	8	8	5	4	4	1	4	4	4	4	3	2	3	5	3	5	2	4	4	7	7	7
Points	2	3	4	4	6	8	10	11	12	12	14	14	14	16	16	17	19	19	20	22	24	26	28	30	32	34	34	34	35	36	37	39	40	40	42	42	44	45	46	46	47	49

Source: Competitive matches
A = Away; H = Home; W = Win; D = Draw; L = Loss

== Fixtures and results ==
=== Second Division ===
9 August 1969 1	Carlisle United	2–3	Cardiff City	Carlisle
15:00	Hugh McIlmoyle; George McVitie (?)		John Toshack; Brian Clark; Peter King	Stadium: Brunton Park; Attendance: 10,506; Referee: Bob Matthewson (Manchester)

13 August 1969 2	Cardiff City	2–2	Swindon Town	Cardiff
19:30	Peter King; Peter King	Swindon report	28' Peter Noble; 34' Arthur Horsfield	Stadium: Ninian Park; Attendance: 27,971; Referee: Peter Walters (Bridgwater)

16 August 1969 3	Cardiff City	0–0	Blackburn Rovers	Cardiff
15:00				Stadium: Ninian Park; Attendance: 19,766; Referee: Dennis Corbett (Wolverhampton)

19 August 1969 4	Swindon Town	2–1	Cardiff City	Swindon
19:30	Chris Jones 11', 69'	Swindon report	Brian Clark	Stadium: County Ground; Attendance: 21,562; Referee: Derek Nippard (Bournemouth)

23 August 1969 5	Bristol City	0–2	Cardiff City	Bristol
15:00			Brian Clark (pen.) Ronnie Bird	Stadium: Ashton Gate; Attendance: 23,237; Referee: Malcolm Sinclair (Guildford)

27 August 1969 6	Cardiff City	1–0	Middlesbrough	Cardiff
19:30	John Toshack			Stadium: Ninian Park; Attendance: 21,648; Referee: Charles Nicholls (Plymouth)

30 August 1969 7	Cardiff City	2–1	Bolton Wanderers	Cardiff
15:00	Peter King; John Toshack		Terry Wharton	Stadium: Ninian Park; Attendance: 21,068; Referee: Roger Kirkpatrick (Leicester)

6 September 1969 8	Charlton Athletic	0–0	Cardiff City	London
				Stadium: The Valley; Attendance: 13,748; Referee: Bill Castle (Dudley, Worcestershire)

13 September 1969 9	Cardiff City	1–1	Leicester City	Cardiff
15:00	John Toshack		(o.g.) David Carver	Stadium: Ninian Park; Attendance: 26,978; Referee: Derek Nippard (Bournemouth)

20 September 1969 10	Sheffield United	1–0	Cardiff City	Sheffield
15:00	Gil Reece			Stadium: Bramall Lane; Attendance: 17,296

27 September 1969 11	Cardiff City	4–2	Queens Park Rangers	Cardiff
15:00	John Toshack; John Toshack; John Toshack; Peter King		(pen.) Terry Venables (?) Barry Bridges	Stadium: Ninian Park; Attendance: 30,083; Referee: Tony Morrissey (Bramhall)

4 October 1969 12	Blackpool	3–2	Cardiff City	Blackpool
15:00	Alan Suddick; Fred Pickering; John Craven		John Toshack; John Toshack	Stadium: Bloomfield Road; Attendance: 18,115; Referee: DC Fieldsend (Sheffield)

8 October 1969 13	Blackburn Rovers	1–0	Cardiff City	Blackburn
	Brian Hill			Stadium: Ewood Park; Attendance: 15,062; Referee: John Yates (Redditch)

11 October 1969 14	Cardiff City	4–0	Aston Villa	Cardiff
15:00	John Toshack; John Toshack; Ronnie Bird; Ronnie Bird (pen.)	Report		Stadium: Ninian Park; Attendance: 25,896; Referee: Arthur Jones (Ormskirk, Lancashire)

18 October 1969 15	Cardiff City	0–1	Norwich City	Cardiff
15:00			(pen.) Charlie Crickmore	Stadium: Ninian Park; Attendance: 23,618; Referee: Keith Walker (Maidstone)

25 October 1969 16	Birmingham City	1–1	Cardiff City	Birmingham
15:00	Tony Hateley		Brian Clark	Stadium: St Andrew's; Attendance: 28,385; Referee: Tommy Dawes (Norwich)

1 November 1969 17	Cardiff City	6–0	Hull City	Cardiff
15:00	Peter King (pen.); Brian Clark; Brian Clark; John Toshack; John Toshack; Mel Sutton			Stadium: Ninian Park; Attendance: 20,446; Referee: DJ Lyden (Birmingham)

8 November 1969 18	Portsmouth	3–0	Cardiff City	Portsmouth
15:00	Ray Hiron; Ray Hiron; Ray Pointer			Stadium: Fratton Park; Attendance: 17,302

15 November 1969 19	Oxford United	1–1	Cardiff City	Oxford
15:00	John Shepherd		Leslie Lea	Stadium: Manor Ground; Attendance: 11,012; Referee: Ivan Robinson (Manchester)

22 November 1969 20	Cardiff City	2–1	Preston North End	Cardiff
15:00	Brian Clark; Peter King		Gerry Ingram	Stadium: Ninian Park; Attendance: 22,678; Referee: JR Osborne (Ipswich)

6 December 1969 21	Cardiff City	3–1	Watford	Cardiff
15:00	Brian Clark; Brian Clark; Ronnie Bird		Bernie Lewis	Stadium: Ninian Park; Attendance: 15,058; Referee: John Hunting (Leicester)

13 December 1969 22	Leicester City	1–2	Cardiff City	Leicester
15:00	Rodney Fern		Brian Clark; Peter King	Stadium: Filbert Street; Attendance: 22,590

15 December 1969 23	Millwall	1–2	Cardiff City	London
19:30	Steve Brown		Peter King (pen.) Ronnie Bird	Stadium: The Den; Attendance: 9,421

20 December 1969 24	Cardiff City	1–0	Charlton Athletic	Cardiff
15:00	Brian Clark			Stadium: Ninian Park; Attendance: 13,026; Referee: Roy Darlington (Runcorn)

29 December 1969 25	Cardiff City	1–0	Bristol City	Cardiff
19:30	John Toshack			Stadium: Ninian Park; Attendance: 18,496; Referee: Dennis Pugh (Chester)

10 January 1970 26	Cardiff City	3–0	Sheffield United	Cardiff
15:00	Brian Clark; Brian Clark; Ronnie Bird			Stadium: Ninian Park; Attendance: 25,135; Referee: Vernon Batty (Helsby Cheshire)

17 January 1970 27	Queens Park Rangers	2–1	Cardiff City	London
15:00	Ian Gillard; Rodney Marsh		John Toshack	Stadium: Loftus Road; Attendance: 22,033

24 January 1970 28	Huddersfield	1–0	Cardiff City	Huddersfield
15:00	Jimmy Nicholson			Stadium: Leeds Road; Attendance: 21,788; Referee: Bob Matthewson (Worsley, Nr Manchester)

31 January 1970 29	Cardiff City	2–2	Blackpool	Cardiff
15:00	John Toshack; John Toshack		Micky Burns; Alan Suddick	Stadium: Ninian Park; Attendance: 24,717; Referee: DA Corbett (Essington, Nr Wolverhampton)

7 February 1970 30	Aston Villa	1–1	Cardiff City	Birmingham
15:00	Bruce Rioch	Report	Brian Clark	Stadium: Villa Park; Attendance: 27,000; Referee: Norman Burtenshaw (Great Yarmouth)

14 February 1970 31	Cardiff City	1–1	Carlisle United	Cardiff
15:00	Bobby Woodruff		Chris Balderstone	Stadium: Ninian Park; Attendance: 20,143; Referee: Roy Capey (Madeley Heath)

21 February 1970 32	Cardiff City	3–1	Birmingham City	Cardiff
15:00	Peter King; Ronnie Bird (pen.); Brian Clark		(o.g.) Gary Bell	Stadium: Ninian Park; Attendance: 21,910; Referee: Mike Kerkhof (Bicester)

28 February 1970 33	Norwich City	1–1	Cardiff City	Norwich
15:00	Ken Foggo		Brian Clark	Stadium: Carrow Road; Attendance: 12,074

14 March 1970 34	Cardiff City	0–1	Huddersfield	Cardiff
15:00			(o.g.) Brian Harris	Stadium: Ninian Park; Attendance: 26,004; Referee: Keith Walker (Maidstone)

18 March 1970 35	Bolton Wanderers	0–1	Cardiff City	Bolton
			Bobby Woodruff	Stadium: Burnden Park; Attendance: 10,126

21 March 1970 36	Watford	2–1	Cardiff City	Watford
15:00	Tom Walley 75'; Barry Endean 85'		34' Brian Clark	Stadium: Vicarage Road; Attendance: 17,152; Referee: Dennis Turner (Rugeley)

25 March 1970 37	Cardiff City	2–0	Portsmouth	Cardiff
19:30	Bobby Woodruff; Mel Sutton			Stadium: Ninian Park; Attendance: 17,005; Referee: Charles Nicholls (Plymouth)

28 March 1970 38	Cardiff City	0–0	Oxford United	Cardiff
15:00				Stadium: Ninian Park; Attendance: 21,118; Referee: Reg Paine (Hounslow)

31 March 1970 39	Hull City	1–1	Cardiff City	Hull
19:30	Ian Butler		Frank Sharp	Stadium: Boothferry Park; Attendance: 13,038; Referee: Ivan Robinson (Manchester)

4 April 1970 40	Middlesbrough	2–1	Cardiff City	Middlesbrough
15:00	Hugh McIlmoyle; Joe Laidlaw		Brian Clark	Stadium: Ayresome Park; Attendance: 13,829

15 April 1970 41	Cardiff City	0–0	Millwall	Cardiff
19:30				Stadium: Ninian Park; Attendance: 8,436; Referee: Derek Nippard (Bournemouth)

20 April 1970 42	Preston North End	1–2	Cardiff City	Preston
	Bert Patrick		Ronnie Bird; Don Murray	Stadium: Deepdale; Attendance: 7,882; Referee: Keith Styles (Barnsley)

=== League Cup ===
3 September 1969 2	Crystal Palace	3–1	Cardiff City	London
19:30	John Sewell; John Sewell; Per Bartram		Leslie Lea	Stadium: Selhurst Park; Attendance: 18,616

=== FA Cup ===
3 January 1970 3	York City	1–1	Cardiff City	York
15:00	Phil Boyer		(o.g.) Barry Swallow	Stadium: Bootham Crescent; Attendance: 8,439

12 January 1970 3 (Replay)	Cardiff City	1–1 (a.e.t.)	York City	Cardiff
	John Toshack		ArchieTaylor	Stadium: Ninian Park; Attendance: 21,263

15 January 1970 3 (Second Replay)	York City	3–1 (a.e.t.)	Cardiff City	Birmingham
	Barry Swallow; Barry Swallow; Paul Aimson		Peter King	Stadium: St Andrew's; Attendance: 7,347; Referee: Bill Castle (Dudley)

=== European Cup Winners Cup ===
17 September 1969 1 (First Leg)	Mjøndalen IF	1–7	Cardiff City	Mjøndalen, Norway
16:30	Jan Olsen 44'		3', 36' Brian Clark; 42', 88' John Toshack; 71' Leslie Lea; 74' Mel Sutton; 79' Peter King	Stadium: Nedre Eiker Stadion; Attendance: 8,000; Referee: Joseph Hannet (Belgium)

1 October 1969 1 (Second Leg)	Cardiff City	5–1 (12–2 agg.)	Mjøndalen IF	Cardiff
19:30	Peter King 16', 62'; Sandy Allan 36', 39', 43'		38' Egil Solberg	Stadium: Ninian Park; Attendance: 14,730; Referee: Gunther Mannig (East Germany)

12 November 1969 2 (First Leg)	Göztepe A.Ş.	3–0	Cardiff City	İzmir, Turkey
	Fevzi Zemzem 14'; Ertan Ãznur 30'; John Nielsen 32'			Stadium: İzmir Alsancak Stadium; Attendance: 24,000; Referee: Lado Jakše (Yugoslavia)

26 November 1969 2 (Second Leg)	Cardiff City	1–0 (1–3 agg.)	Göztepe A.Ş.	Cardiff
19:30	Ronnie Bird 78'			Stadium: Ninian Park; Attendance: 17,866; Referee: Gilbert Droz (Switzerland)

=== Welsh Cup ===
21 January 1970 Round 3	Cardiff City	6–1	Barmouth & Dyffryn United	Cardiff
19:30	Brian Clark; Brian Clark; Brian Clark; Brian Clark; Brian Clark; John Toshack		Goal	Stadium: Ninian Park; Attendance: 4,901

4 February 1970 Round 4	Cardiff City	3–0	Wrexham	Cardiff
19:30	Peter King 5'; Brian Clark 21', 25'	Wrexham report		Stadium: Ninian Park; Attendance: 12,332; Referee: Tom Reynolds (Swansea)

11 March 1970 Semi Final	Cardiff City	2–2	Swansea City	Cardiff
19:30	Bobby Woodruff (75s); John Toshack		14' Brian Evans; Herbie Williams	Stadium: Ninian Park; Attendance: 18,050; Referee: IP Jones (Trelewis)

2 May 1970 Semi Final (Replay)	Swansea City	0–2 (a.e.t.)	Cardiff City	Swansea
			Ronnie Bird; Peter King	Stadium: Vetch Field; Attendance: 16,000

8 May 1970 Final (First leg)	Chester City	0–1	Cardiff City	Chester
			Ronnie Bird	Stadium: Sealand Road; Attendance: 3,087; Referee: Clive Thomas (Treorchy)

13 May 1970 Final (Second leg)	Cardiff City	4–0 (5–0 agg.)	Chester City	Cardiff
19:30	Bobby Woodruff; Ronnie Bird; Leslie Lea; Brian Clark			Stadium: Ninian Park; Attendance: 5,567; Referee: Clive Thomas (Treorchy)

== See also ==
- Cardiff City F.C. seasons

== Bibliography ==
- Hayes, Dean (2006). The Who's Who of Cardiff City. Breedon Books. ISBN 1-85983-462-0.
- Crooks, John (1992). Cardiff City Football Club: Official History of the Bluebirds. Yore Publications. ISBN 0-9513321-8-X.
- Rothmans Football Yearbook 1970–71. Queen Anne Press. 1970. ISBN 0-362-00071-9.
- Barry J Hugman, ed. (1984). Canon League Football Players' Records 1946–1984. Newnes Books. ISBN 0-600-37318-5.
- Shepherd, Richard (2002). The Definitive Cardiff City F.C. Nottingham: SoccerData Publications. ISBN 1-899468-17-X.
- Risoli, Mario (2014). From Tashkent With Love. St David's Press. ISBN 978-1-90271-941-2.
- "Cardiff City match-day Programmes (from season 1969–70)". Cardiff City Programmes. Cardiff City Football Club. 1970.
- "Football Club History Database – Cardiff City". Archived from the original on 30 December 2008.
- Welsh Football Data Archive
