= 1967–68 Cardiff City F.C. season =

Welsh football club season

Cardiff City
1967–68 season
- Chairman: Fred Dewey
- Manager: Jimmy Scoular
- Football League Second Division: 13th
- FA Cup: 3rd round
- League Cup: 2nd round
- European Cup Winners Cup: Semi-finals
- Welsh Cup: Winners
- Top goalscorer: League: Peter King (12); All: Peter King (18)
- Highest home attendance: 20,021 (v QPR, 16 April 1968)
- Lowest home attendance: 8,396 (v Charlton, 11 May 1968)
- Average home league attendance: 13,301
Home colours

The 1967–68 season was Cardiff City F.C.'s 41st season in the Football League. They competed in the 22-team Division Two, then the second tier of English football, finishing thirteenth.

During the season they enjoyed their most successful season in European competition by reaching the semi-final of the European Cup Winners Cup before being beaten 4–3 on aggregate by German side Hamburg. It remains the furthest a Welsh team has ever reached in European competition.

== Players ==
Note: Flags indicate national team as defined under FIFA eligibility rules; some limited exceptions apply. Players may hold more than one non-FIFA nationality.

Pos.	Nation	Player
GK	ENG	Fred Davies
GK	ENG	Bob Wilson
DF	ENG	Gary Bell
DF	ENG	David Carver
DF	WAL	Graham Coldrick
DF	WAL	Steve Derrett
DF	ENG	Bobby Ferguson
DF	WAL	Richie Morgan
DF	SCO	Don Murray
MF	ENG	Ronnie Bird
MF	SCO	Malcolm Clarke
MF	ENG	Brian Harris
MF	WAL	Barrie Jones

Pos.	Nation	Player
MF	WAL	Bryn Jones
MF	ENG	Peter King
MF	ENG	Leslie Lea
MF	WAL	Bernie Lewis
MF	WAL	Leighton Phillips
MF	WAL	David Summerhayes
MF	ENG	Gareth Williams
FW	SCO	Sandy Allan
FW	ENG	Bobby Brown
FW	ENG	Brian Clark
FW	ENG	Norman Dean
FW	WAL	John Toshack

== League standings ==
Pos	Team	Pld	W	D	L	GF	GA	GAv	Pts	Qualification or relegation
11	Crystal Palace	42	14	11	17	56	56	1.000	39	
12	Bolton Wanderers	42	13	13	16	60	63	0.952	39	
13	Cardiff City	42	13	12	17	60	66	0.909	38	Qualification for the Cup Winners' Cup first round (Note: Cardiff City qualified for the European Cup Winners' Cup as the 1967–68 Welsh Cup winners.)
14	Huddersfield Town	42	13	12	17	46	61	0.754	38	
15	Charlton Athletic	42	12	13	17	63	68	0.926	37	

Rules for classification: 1) Points; 2) Goal average; 3) Goals scored

=== Results by round ===
Round	1	2	3	4	5	6	7	8	9	10	11	12	13	14	15	16	17	18	19	20	21	22	23	24	25	26	27	28	29	30	31	32	33	34	35	36	37	38	39	40	41	42
Ground	H	A	H	A	A	H	A	H	A	A	H	A	H	A	A	H	A	H	H	A	A	H	H	A	H	H	A	H	A	H	A	H	A	H	A	A	H	H	A	H	A	H
Result	D	D	W	L	D	W	L	L	L	L	D	D	W	W	L	L	W	W	D	L	D	L	W	L	W	D	W	W	L	L	W	L	L	L	L	D	W	W	D	D	L	D
Position			9	14	12	10	12	13	13	15	14	17	15	14	14	16	15	15	13	15	15	15	15	15	13	14	13	12	12	16	13	14	15	17	17	18	17	16	17	14	14	15
Points	1	2	4	4	5	7	7	7	7	7	8	9	11	13	13	13	15	17	18	18	19	19	21	21	23	24	26	28	28	28	30	30	30	30	30	31	33	35	36	37	37	38

Source: Competitive matches
A = Away; H = Home; W = Win; D = Draw; L = Loss

== Fixtures and results ==
=== Second Division ===
19 August 1967 1	Cardiff City	1 – 1	Plymouth Argyle	Cardiff
15:00	Bobby Brown (pen.)		87' John Mitten	Stadium: Ninian Park; Attendance: 17,169; Referee: Danny Lyden (Birmingham)

26 August 1967 2	Bolton Wanderers	1 – 1	Cardiff City	Bolton
	Francis Lee 24'		44' Peter King	Stadium: Burnden Park; Attendance: 10,654; Referee: John Thacker (Scarborough)

30 August 1967 3	Cardiff City	4 – 2	Crystal Palace	Cardiff
19:30	Barrie Jones; Bobby Brown; Ronnie Bird; Peter King		(pen.) Johnny Byrne; Cliff Jackson	Stadium: Ninian Park; Attendance: 14,351; Referee: DW Brady

2 September 1967 4	Portsmouth	3 – 1	Cardiff City	Portsmouth
15:00	Nicky Jennings 13'; George Smith 34'; Ray Pointer 68'		56' Bobby Brown	Stadium: Fratton Park; Attendance: 17,308; Referee: Tommy Dawes (Norwich)

5 September 1967 5	Charlton Athletic	1 – 1	Cardiff City	London
	Paul Went 86'		35' Bobby Brown	Stadium: The Valley; Attendance: 8,523; Referee: Harold Richards (Oldham)

9 September 1967 6	Cardiff City	3 – 1	Norwich City	Cardiff
15:00	Peter King 10'; Bobby Brown 35' (pen.); Barrie Jones 80'		71' Terry Anderson	Stadium: Ninian Park; Attendance: 14,674; Referee: RF Prichard (Salisbury)

16 September 1967 7	Rotherham United	3 – 2	Cardiff City	Rotherham
15:00	Les Chappell 23'; Laurie Sheffield 38'; John Galley 69'		52' Peter King; 83' Don Murray	Stadium: Millmoor; Attendance: 5,842; Referee: John Yates (Redditch)

23 September 1967 8	Cardiff City	1 – 5	Derby County	Cardiff
15:00	Ronnie Bird 81' (pen.)		22', 60', 82' Kevin Hector; 34', 84' John O'Hare	Stadium: Ninian Park; Attendance: 15,375; Referee: Harry New (Portsmouth)

27 September 1967 9	Crystal Palace	2 – 1	Cardiff City	London
	Bobby Woodruff 56'; Steve Kember 69'		76' Barrie Jones	Stadium: Selhurst Park; Attendance: 20,424; Referee: Dave Wallace (Crewe)

30 September 1967 10	Preston North End	3 – 0	Cardiff City	Preston
	Ernie Hannigan 42', 48'; George Lyall 65'			Stadium: Deepdale; Attendance: 13,735; Referee: Harold Williams (Sheffield)

7 October 1967 11	Cardiff City	1 – 1	Ipswich Town	Cardiff
15:00	John Toshack 19'		33' Billy Houghton	Stadium: Ninian Park; Attendance: 11,261; Referee: Derek Nippard (Bournemouth)

14 October 1967 12	Bristol City	1 – 1	Cardiff City	Bristol
15:00	Chris Crowe 57'		42' Bobby Brown	Stadium: Ashton Gate; Attendance: 15,609; Referee: Gordon Hill

21 October 1967 13	Cardiff City	3 – 0	Middlesbrough	Cardiff
19:30	John Toshack 26', 66'; Peter King 70'			Stadium: Ninian Park; Attendance: 10,441; Referee: Jack Taylor (Wolverhampton)

27 October 1967 14	Hull City	1 – 2	Cardiff City	Hull
19:30	Ken Wagstaff (13s)		62' Bobby Brown; 66' Ronnie Bird	Stadium: Boothferry Park; Attendance: 18,579; Referee: Maurice Fussey (Nottingham)

11 November 1967 15	Blackpool	3 – 1	Cardiff City	Blackpool
15:00	Gerry Ingram 8'; Jimmy Robson 46'; Alan Skirton 75'		15' Malcolm Clarke	Stadium: Bloomfield Road; Attendance: 11,324; Referee: George McCabe (Sheffield)

18 November 1967 16	Cardiff City	1 – 3	Birmingham City	Cardiff
15:00	John Toshack 35'		33' Johnny Vincent; 44' Barry Bridges; 78' Bert Murray	Stadium: Ninian Park; Attendance: 13,673; Referee: Dave Wallace (Swindon)

25 November 1967 17	Carlisle United	1 – 3	Cardiff City	Carlisle
15:00	Hugh McIlmoyle 52'		42', 73' John Toshack; 84' Gary Bell	Stadium: Brunton Park; Attendance: 10,966

2 December 1967 18	Cardiff City	3 – 2	Blackburn Rovers	Cardiff
15:00	Peter King 24', 26'; Malcolm Clarke 62'		37' Barrie Hole; 41' Keith Newton	Stadium: Ninian Park; Attendance: 9,829; Referee: Harold Davey (Dorset)

5 December 1967 19	Cardiff City	2 – 2	Millwall	Cardiff
19:30	John Toshack; Bobby Brown		(??) Keith Weller	Stadium: Ninian Park; Attendance: 11,993

9 December 1967 20	Huddersfield Town	1 – 0	Cardiff City	Huddersfield
	Jimmy Nicholson 47'			Stadium: Leeds Road; Attendance: 8,552; Referee: Ray Tinkler (Boston)

16 December 1967 21	Plymouth Argyle	0 – 0	Cardiff City	Plymouth
				Stadium: Home Park; Attendance: 10,736; Referee: Ken Markham (Woking)

23 December 1967 22	Cardiff City	1 – 3	Bolton Wanderers	Cardiff
15:00	Bobby Brown 52' (pen.)		1' Roy Greaves; 45' (o.g.) David Carver; 82' Gordon Taylor	Stadium: Ninian Park; Attendance: 11,082

26 December 1967 23	Cardiff City	3 – 0	Aston Villa	Cardiff
15:00	Leslie Lea 16', 81'; John Toshack 51'			Stadium: Ninian Park; Attendance: 18,180; Referee: Jim Finney (Hereford)

30 December 1967 24	Aston Villa	2 – 1	Cardiff City	Birmingham
15:00	Willie Anderson 61'; Brian Greenhalgh 78'		36' Norman Dean	Stadium: Villa Park; Attendance: 17,667; Referee: Reg Paine (Heston, Middlesex)

6 January 1968 25	Cardiff City	3 – 0	Portsmouth	Cardiff
15:00	Malcolm Clarke 21'; Ronnie Bird 31'; Peter King 39'			Stadium: Ninian Park; Attendance: 14,925; Referee: Peter Walters (Bridgwater)

20 January 1968 26	Cardiff City	2 – 2	Rotherham United	Cardiff
15:00	Ronnie Bird 51'; Leighton Phillips 75'		32' John Quinn; 45' David Bentley	Stadium: Ninian Park; Attendance: 8,748; Referee: David Smith (Stonehouse)

3 February 1968 27	Derby County	3 – 4	Cardiff City	Derby
15:00	Alan Hinton 46'; Kevin Hector 50'; Alan Durban 85'		4', 84' Brian Clark; 31', 80' Peter King	Stadium: Baseball Ground; Attendance: 18,096; Referee: Lol Cussons (York)

10 February 1968 28	Cardiff City	2 – 0	Preston North End	Cardiff
15:00	Brian Clark 9'; John Toshack 88'			Stadium: Ninian Park; Attendance: 12,897; Referee: John Yates (Redditch)

24 February 1968 29	Ipswich Town	4 – 2	Cardiff City	Ipswich
15:00	Frank Brogan 9' (pen.); John O'Rourke 53', 85'; Ray Crawford 65'		64' Brian Clark; 78' Leslie Lea	Stadium: Portman Road; Attendance: 15,580; Referee: Maurice Fussey (Retford)

2 March 1968 30	Cardiff City	0 – 1	Bristol City	Cardiff
15:00			64' John Galley	Stadium: Ninian Park; Attendance: 15,334; Referee: Danny Lyden (Birmingham)

9 March 1968 31	Middlesbrough	2 – 3	Cardiff City	Middlesbrough
15:00	Johnny Crossan 40'; John Hickton 50'		44' John Toshack; 60' Brian Clark; 70' Barrie Jones	Stadium: Ayresome Park; Attendance: 15,582; Referee: Harold Davey (Mansfield)

22 March 1968 32	Cardiff City	2 – 3	Hull City	Cardiff
19:30	Brian Clark; Peter King		Ken Wagstaff; Ray Henderson; Ray Henderson	Stadium: Ninian Park; Attendance: 11,975; Referee: TE Lockett (Worcestershire)

30 March 1968 33	Millwall	3 – 1	Cardiff City	Millwall
15:15	Malcolm Clarke 23' (o.g.); Barry Kitchener 39'; Brian Conlon 63'		28' Leslie Lea	Stadium: The Den; Attendance: 7,904; Referee: JWJ Clarke (Studley)

6 April 1968 34	Cardiff City	1 – 3	Blackpool	Cardiff
15:00	Peter King 37'		12' Alan Skirton; 54', 71' Alan Suddick	Stadium: Ninian Park; Attendance: 14,416; Referee: AE Dimond (Harlow, Essex)

12 April 1968 35	Queens Park Rangers	1 – 0	Cardiff City	London
11:30	Ian Morgan			Stadium: Loftus Road; Attendance: 23,043; Referee: Charles Nicholls (Plymouth)

13 April 1968 36	Birmingham City	0 – 0	Cardiff City	Birmingham
				Stadium: St Andrew's; Attendance: 29,044; Referee: Keith Walker (Maidstone, Kent)

16 April 1968 37	Cardiff City	1 – 0	Queens Park Rangers	Cardiff
19:30	John Toshack			Stadium: Ninian Park; Attendance: 20,021; Referee: Bill Handley (Cannock)
Note: Mike Keen missed a penalty for QPR

20 April 1968 38	Cardiff City	1 – 0	Carlisle United	Cardiff
15:00	Barrie Jones 23'			Stadium: Ninian Park; Attendance: 13,926; Referee: Ken Dagnall (Blackburn)

27 April 1968 39	Blackburn Rovers	1 – 1	Cardiff City	Blackburn
	Barrie Hole 44'		19' (pen.) Barrie Jones	Stadium: Ewood Park; Attendance: 7,195; Referee: Ron Barker (Cheshire)

4 May 1968 40	Cardiff City	0 – 0	Huddersfield Town	Cardiff
15:00				Stadium: Ninian Park; Attendance: 10,647; Referee: RF Prichard (Salisbury)

8 May 1968 41	Norwich City	1 – 0	Cardiff City	Norwich
19:15	Ken Foggo			Stadium: Carrow Road; Attendance: 10,177; Referee: Derek Nippard (Bournemouth)

11 May 1968 42	Cardiff City	0 – 0	Charlton Athletic	Cardiff
15:00				Stadium: Ninian Park; Attendance: 8,396; Referee: Dave Wallace (Swindon)

=== League Cup ===
23 August 1967 1	Aldershot	2 – 3	Cardiff City	Aldershot
	Goal		(?) Bobby Brown; Peter King	Stadium: Recreation Ground; Attendance: 5,133

12 September 1967 2	Burnley	2 – 1	Cardiff City	Burnley
19:30	Gordon Harris 87'; Frank Casper 89'		72' Graham Coldrick	Stadium: Turf Moor; Attendance: 11,631; Referee: Peter Baldwin (Redcar)

=== FA Cup ===
27 January 1968 Round 3	Stoke City	4 – 1	Cardiff City	Stoke
15:15	Willie Stevenson 44'; Roy Vernon 43'; Harry Burrows 52', 62'		63' Barrie Jones	Stadium: Victoria Ground; Attendance: 23,563; Referee: Peter Walters (Bridgwater)

=== European Cup Winners' Cup ===
20 September 1967 1 (1st Leg)	Shamrock Rovers	1 – 1	Cardiff City	Dublin
20:00	Bobby Gilbert 16'		48' Peter King	Stadium: Dalymount Park; Attendance: 21,883; Referee: Piet Roomer (Netherlands)

4 October 1967 1 (2nd Leg)	Cardiff City	2 – 0 (3 – 1 agg.)	Shamrock Rovers	Cardiff
19:30	John Toshack 30'; Bobby Brown 74' (pen.)			Stadium: Ninian Park; Attendance: 14,180; Referee: Vital Loraux (Belgium)

15 November 1967 2 (1st Leg)	NAC Breda	1 – 1	Cardiff City	Eindhoven
20:00	Jacques Visschers 9'		68' Peter King	Stadium: Philips Stadion; Attendance: 7,618; Referee: Kare Sirevaag (Norway)

29 November 1967 2(2nd Leg)	Cardiff City	4 – 1 (5 – 2 agg.)	NAC Breda	Cardiff
19:30	Bobby Brown 2'; Barrie Jones 19'; John Toshack 67'; Malcolm Clarke 66'		29' Frie Nouwens	Stadium: Ninian Park; Attendance: 16,411; Referee: Gunnar Michaelsen (Denmark)

6 March 1968 QF(1st Leg)	Cardiff City	1 – 0	Torpedo Moscow	Cardiff
19:30	Barrie Jones 43'			Stadium: Ninian Park; Attendance: 30,567; Referee: Robert Schaut (Belgium)

19 March 1968 QF(2nd Leg)	Torpedo Moscow	1 – 0 (1 – 1 agg.)	Cardiff City	Tashkent
18:30	Mikhail Gershkovich 34'			Stadium: Pakhtakor Stadium; Attendance: 37,049; Referee: Bertil Loow (Sweden)

3 April 1968 QF(replay)	Torpedo Moscow	0 – 1	Cardiff City	Augsburg
			41' Norman Dean	Stadium: Rosenaustadion; Attendance: 25,851; Referee: Helmut Fritz (West Germany)

24 April 1968 SF(1st Leg)	Hamburg	1 – 1	Cardiff City	Hamburg
	Helmut Sandemann 69'		4' Norman Dean	Stadium: Volksparkstadion; Attendance: 64,410; Referee: Jose Maria Ortiz de Mendibil (Spain)

1 May 1968 SF(2nd Leg)	Cardiff City	2 – 3 (3 – 4 agg.)	Hamburg	Cardiff
19:30	Norman Dean 10'; Brian Harris 78'		15' Franz-Josef Honig; 57' Uwe Seeler; 90' Franz-Josef Honig	Stadium: Ninian Park; Attendance: 43,070; Referee: Laurens van Ravens (Netherlands)

=== Welsh Cup ===
16 January 1968 Round 5	Cardiff City	8–0	Ebbw Vale	Cardiff
19:30	John Toshack; John Toshack; John Toshack; Ronnie Bird; Ronnie Bird; Ronnie Bird (pen.); Peter King; Leslie Lea			Stadium: Ninian Park; Attendance: 3,542; Referee: Alan (LA) Howells (Baglan, Port Talbot)

12 February 1968 Round 6	Wrexham	1–3	Cardiff City	Wrexham
19:15	Arfon Griffiths 47'	Wrexham report	22' Ronnie Bird; 28' Leslie Lea; 51' Barrie Jones	Stadium: The Racecourse; Attendance: 7,671; Referee: Leo Callaghan (Merthyr Tydfil)

27 March 1968 Semi Final	Chester City	0–3	Cardiff City	Chester
19:00			Peter King; John Toshack; Leslie Lea	Stadium: Sealand Road; Attendance: 5,488

6 May 1968 Final (First leg)	Hereford United	0–2	Cardiff City	Hereford
19:15			Barrie Jones; Peter King	Stadium: Edgar Street; Attendance: 5,442; Referee: Iorwerth Jones (Trelewis)

16 May 1968 Final (Second leg)	Cardiff City	4–1 (6–1 agg.)	Hereford United	Cardiff
19:30	Norman Dean; Malcolm Clarke; Page (o.g.); Leslie Lea		Goal	Stadium: Ninian Park; Attendance: 6,036; Referee: Iorwerth Jones (Trelewis)

== See also ==
- List of Cardiff City F.C. seasons

== Bibliography ==
- Hayes, Dean (2006). The Who's Who of Cardiff City. Breedon Books. ISBN 1-85983-462-0.
- Shepherd, Richard (2002). The Definitive Cardiff City F.C. Tony Brown. ISBN 1-899-46817-X.
- Crooks, John (1992). Cardiff City Football Club: Official History of the Bluebirds. Yore Publications. ISBN 0-9513321-8-X.
- "Football Club History Database – Cardiff City". Archived from the original on 30 December 2008.
- Welsh Football Data Archive
