= 1972 Watney Cup =

Third edition of the Watney Cup

Watney Mann Invitation Cup

Tournament details
- Country: England; Wales
- Dates: 29 July – 5 August
- Teams: 8

Final positions
- Champions: Bristol Rovers (1st title)
- Runners-up: Sheffield United

Tournament statistics
- Matches played: 7
- Goals scored: 12 (1.71 per match)
- Attendance: 81,537 (11,648 per match)
- Top goal scorer(s): Bruce Bannister; Tony Currie; Alan Woodward (2 goals each)

The 1972 Watney Cup was the third edition of the Watney Mann Invitation Cup, a short-lived invitational association football tournament.

It was won by Bristol Rovers, who beat Sheffield United in the final at Eastville.

== Background ==
The Watney Cup was introduced in 1970 to help increase the competitiveness of pre-season fixtures. Its name was a result of a sponsorship from brewing company Watney Combe & Reid. The tournament featured eight invited teams, with two selected from each division of the Football League. Those chosen to participate were the top two highest scoring teams from each division who had not gained promotion nor earned a place in a European competition the previous season.

== Format ==
The competition was a straight knockout tournament. In continuation from the second edition of the Watney Cup, games that ended level proceeded straight to penalties. In the inaugural edition, an additional 30 minutes of extra time was played to determine a winner prior to a penalty shoot-out.

== Teams ==
First Division

- Sheffield United
- Wolverhampton Wanderers

Second Division

- Blackpool
- Burnley

Third Division

- Bristol Rovers
- Notts County

Fourth Division

- Lincoln City
- Peterborough United

== Tournament ==
=== Quarter-finals ===
29 July 1972

Bristol Rovers (3)	2–0	Wolverhampton Wanderers (1)
Bannister 26' (pen.); Stephens 88'	Report

Eastville Stadium, Bristol
Attendance: 12,489
29 July 1972

Lincoln City (4)	0–1	Burnley (2)
	Report	James

Sincil Bank, Lincoln
Attendance: 7,428
29 July 1972

Notts County (3)	0–3	Sheffield United (1)
	Report	Woodward; Currie

Meadow Lane, Nottingham
Attendance: 14,405
29 July 1972

Peterborough United (4)	0–0	Blackpool (2)
	Report
Penalties
	7–6

London Road Stadium, Peterborough
Attendance: 7,651

=== Semi-finals ===
2 August 1972

Burnley (2)	0–2	Bristol Rovers (3)
	Report	Prince 15'; Bannister 49'

Turf Moor, Burnley
Attendance: 10,589
2 August 1972

Peterborough United (4)	0–4	Sheffield United (1)
	Report	MacKenzie 17'; Dearden; Woodward 68' (pen.); Hemsley

London Road Stadium, Peterborough
Attendance: 9,207

=== Final ===
1972 Watney Cup final
- Event: 1972 Watney Cup
Bristol Rovers	Sheffield United
0	0
- Bristol Rovers won 7–6 on penalties
- Date: 5 August 1972
- Venue: Eastville Stadium, Bristol
- Referee: John Yates (Redditch)
- Attendance: 19,768

The 1972 Watney Cup final was held at Eastville Stadium in Bristol on 5 August 1972 and had an attendance of 19,768. It was contested by Bristol Rovers and Sheffield United. Bristol Rovers won the match 7–6 on penalties, following a 0–0 draw.

==== Match details ====
5 August 1972
15:00 (BST)

Bristol Rovers	0–0	Sheffield United
	Report
Penalties
Roberts (penalty scored); Godfrey (penalty scored); Green (penalty scored); Bannister (penalty scored); Allan (penalty scored); Parsons (penalty scored); B. Jones (penalty scored)	7–6	Woodward (penalty scored); Eddy (penalty scored); Currie (penalty scored); Dearden (penalty scored); Colquhoun (penalty scored); Scullion (penalty scored); Hemsley (penalty missed)

Eastville Stadium, Bristol
Attendance: 19,768
Referee: John Yates (Redditch)

Bristol Rovers	Sheffield United

GK	1	(England) Dick Sheppard
RB	2	(Wales) Phil Roberts
CB	5	(England) Stuart Taylor
CB	4	(England) Mike Green
LB	3	(England) Lindsay Parsons
RM	7	(England) Kenny Stephens
CM	8	(Wales) Wayne Jones
CM	6	(Wales) Frankie Prince	(substituted off) 85'
LM	11	(Wales) Brian Godfrey (c)
CF	12	(England) Bruce Bannister
CF	9	(Scotland) Sandy Allan
Substitutes:
CM	14	(Wales) Bryn Jones	(substituted on) 85'
Manager:
(England) Don Megson

GK	1	(Scotland) Tom McAlister
RB	2	(England) Steve Goulding
CB	5	(Scotland) Eddie Colquhoun (c)
CB	4	(England) Ian MacKenzie
LB	3	(England) Ted Hemsley
DM	6	(Wales) Trevor Hockey
CM	10	(England) Tony Currie
CM	8	(England) Geoff Salmons	(substituted off) 90'
RW	7	(England) Alan Woodward
CF	9	(England) Bill Dearden
LW	11	(Scotland) Stewart Scullion
Substitutes:
CM	12	(England) Keith Eddy	(substituted on) 90'
Manager:
(Scotland) John Harris

MATCH RULES

- 90 minutes.
- Penalty shoot-out if scores still level.
- Maximum of two substitutions.

== Goalscorers ==
Rank	Player	Club	Goals
1	(England) Bruce Bannister	Bristol Rovers	2
1	(England) Tony Currie	Sheffield United	2
1	(England) Alan Woodward	Sheffield United	2
2	6 players	Various	1
