= Frank Sharp (footballer, born 1947) =

Scottish footballer

Personal information
- Full name: Frank Sharp
- Date of birth: 28 May 1947 (age 79)
- Place of birth: Edinburgh, Scotland
- Height: 5 ft 10 in (1.78 m)
- Position: Left winger

Youth career
- 1961–1963: Tynecastle Athletic

Senior career*
Years	Team	Apps	(Gls)
1963–1967	Heart of Midlothian	6	(1)
1967–1969	Carlisle United	32	(0)
1969–1970	Cardiff City	14	(1)
1970–1973	Barnsley	125	(7)
1973–1974	Grimsby Town	29	(2)
1974–1975	Port Vale	24	(2)
- Northwich Victoria
Total		230	(13)
- * Club domestic league appearances and goals

Frank Sharp (born 28 May 1947) is a Scottish former footballer who scored 13 goals in 231 league games in a ten-year career in the Football League and Scottish Football League. A winger, he played for Heart of Midlothian, Carlisle United, Cardiff City, Barnsley, Grimsby Town, Port Vale, and Northwich Victoria.

== Career ==
Sharp began his career at junior side Tynecastle Athletic before turning professional with Tommy Walker's Heart of Midlothian. Hearts finished seventh and 11th in the First Division in 1965–66 and 1966–67. He appeared in just six league games at Tynecastle, scoring one goal. In 1967, Sharp joined Carlisle United for a fee of £500 but struggled to hold down a regular first-team place at Brunton Park. The "Cumbrians" finished mid-table in the Second Division in 1967–68 and 1968–69 under the stewardship of first Tim Ward and then Bob Stokoe. He then moved on to Jimmy Scoular's Second Division side Cardiff City. Plagued by injury, Sharp spent just over one season at Ninian Park, his only goal coming in a 1–1 draw with Hull City in March 1970, before he joined Barnsley along with Leslie Lea. Johnny Steele's "Tykes" finished 12th in the Third Division in 1970–71, before suffering relegation in 1971–72 under the stewardship of rookie manager John McSeveney. Johnny Steele then returned to Barnsley and led the club to a 14th-place finish in the Fourth Division in 1972–73. Sharp scored seven goals in 125 league appearances at Oakwell. He then scored two goals in 29 Third Division games at Ron Ashman's Grimsby Town in the 1973–74 season. He left Blundell Park and joined Third Division side Port Vale in May 1974. He opened the 1974–75 season with a goal in each of his first two games at Vale Park but lost his first-team place in November and went to finish the season with 27 league and cup appearances. He was given a free transfer in May 1975 by "Valiants" manager Roy Sproson and moved on to Northern Premier League side Northwich Victoria.

== Career statistics ==
Appearances and goals by club, season and competition
Club	Season	League			National cup (Note: Includes Scottish Cup, FA Cup)		Other		Total	
Club	Season	Division	Apps	Goals	Apps	Goals	Apps	Goals	Apps	Goals
Heart of Midlothian	1963–64	Scottish First Division	0	0	0	0	1	0	1	0
Heart of Midlothian	1964–65	Scottish First Division	0	0	0	0	0	0	0	0
Heart of Midlothian	1965–66	Scottish First Division	6	1	1	0	0	0	7	1
Heart of Midlothian	1966–67	Scottish First Division	0	0	0	0	0	0	0	0
Heart of Midlothian	Total		6	1	1	0	1	0	8	1
Carlisle United	1966–67	Second Division	1	0	0	0	0	0	1	0
Carlisle United	1967–68	Second Division	27	0	0	0	1	0	28	0
Carlisle United	1968–69	Second Division	4	0	0	0	1	0	5	0
Carlisle United	Total		32	0	0	0	2	0	34	0
Cardiff City	1966–67	Second Division	5	0	0	0	0	0	5	0
Cardiff City	1967–68	Second Division	9	1	0	0	1	0	10	1
Cardiff City	Total		14	1	0	0	1	0	15	1
Barnsley	1970–71	Third Division	43	3	4	0	0	0	47	3
Barnsley	1971–72	Third Division	42	0	3	0	2	0	47	0
Barnsley	1972–73	Fourth Division	40	4	2	0	2	0	44	4
Barnsley	Total		125	7	9	0	4	0	138	7
Grimsby Town	1973–74	Third Division	29	2	4	0	4	1	37	3
Port Vale	1974–75	Third Division	24	2	2	0	1	0	27	2
Career total			230	13	16	0	13	1	259	14
