= 1969–70 Carlisle United F.C. season =

Carlisle United F.C.
1969–70 season
- Manager: Bob Stokoe (to January); Ian MacFarlane (from January)
- Stadium: Brunton Park
- Second Division: 12th
- FA Cup: Fifth Round
- League Cup: Semi-Final

For the 1969–70 season, Carlisle United F.C. competed in Football League Division Two.

== Results & fixtures ==
=== Football League Second Division ===
==== League table ====
Pos	Team	Pld	W	D	L	GF	GA	GAv	Pts	Qualification or relegation
10	Millwall	42	15	14	13	56	56	1.000	44	
11	Norwich City	42	16	11	15	49	46	1.065	43	
12	Carlisle United	42	14	13	15	58	56	1.036	41	
13	Hull City	42	15	11	16	72	70	1.029	41	Qualification for the Watney Cup (Note: Sheffield United and Hull City qualified for the Watney Cup as the two teams with the most goals that hadn't already qualified for promotion or a European competition.)
14	Bristol City	42	13	13	16	54	50	1.080	39	

Rules for classification: 1) Points; 2) Goal average; 3) Goals scored

==== Matches ====
Match Day	Date	Opponent	H/A	Score	Carlisle United Scorer(s)	Attendance
1	9 August	Cardiff City	H	2–3		
2	16 August	Swindon Town	A	2–2		
3	19 August	Aston Villa	H	1–1	George McVitie	
4	23 August	Middlesbrough	H	1–0		
5	26 August	Bolton Wanderers	H	2–1		
6	30 August	Norwich City	A	0–1		
7	6 September	Hull City	H	2–1		
8	13 September	Millwall	A	2–4		
9	17 September	Leicester City	A	2–1		
10	20 September	Preston North End	H	1–0		
11	27 September	Birmingham City	A	1–1		
12	4 October	Huddersfield Town	H	0–2		
13	7 October	Swindon Town	H	2–2		
14	11 October	Watford	A	2–1		
15	18 October	Queen's Park Rangers	H	3–2		
16	25 October	Bristol City	A	0–0		
17	1 November	Portsmouth	H	3–3		
18	8 November	Oxford United	A	0–1		
19	12 Novcember	Aston Villa	A	0–1		
20	15 November	Blackburn Rovers	H	0–1		
21	22 November	Charlton Athletic	A	1–2		
22	29 November	Sheffield United	H	0–1		
23	6 December	Blackpool	A	1–1		
24	13 December	Millwall	H	4–0		
25	20 December	Hull City	A	4–2		
26	26 December	Middlesbrough	A	2–0		
27	27 December	Norwich City	H	2–1		
28	10 January	Preston North End	A	1–3		
29	17 January	Birmimgham City	H	4–3		
30	31 January	Huddersfield Town	A	0–1		
31	10 February	Watford	H	5–0		
32	14 February	Cardiff City	A	1–1		
33	21 February	Oxford United	H	1–1		
34	28 February	Portsmouth	A	0–4		
35	7 March	Charlton Athletic	H	1–1		
36	13 March	Sheffield United	A	0–1		
37	21 March	Blackpool	H	1–2		
38	27 March	Queen's Park Rangers	A	0–0		
39	28 March	Blackburn Rovers	A	0–1		
40	31 March	Bristol City	H	2–1		
41	4 April	Bolton Wanderers	A	0–0		
42	14 April	Leicester City	H	2–2		

=== Football League Cup ===
Round	Date	Opponent	H/A	Score	Carlisle United Scorer(s)	Attendance
R2	2 September	Huddersfield Town	H	2–0		
R3	24 September	Blackburn Rovers	H	2–1		
R4	14 October	Chelsea	H	1–0		
QF	29 October	Oxford United	A	0–0		
QF R	4 November	Oxford United	H	1–0		
SF L1	19 November	West Bromwich Albion	H	1–0		
SF L2	3 December	West Bromwich Albion	A	1–4		

=== FA Cup ===
Round	Date	Opponent	H/A	Score	Carlisle United Scorer(s)	Attendance
R3	3 January	Nottingham Forest	A	0–0		
R3 R	6 January	Nottingham Forest	H	2–1		
R4	24 January	Aldershot	H	2–2		
R4 R	28 January	Aldershot	A	4–1		
R5	7 February	Middlesbrough	H	1–2		
