= 1967–68 Carlisle United F.C. season =

Carlisle United F.C.
1967–68 season
- Manager: Tim Ward
- Stadium: Brunton Park
- Second Division: 10th
- FA Cup: Fourth round
- League Cup: Second round

For the 1967–68 season, Carlisle United F.C. competed in Football League Second Division.

== Results & fixtures ==
=== Football League Second Division ===
==== League table ====
Pos	Team	Pld	W	D	L	GF	GA	GAv	Pts
8	Blackburn Rovers	42	16	11	15	56	49	1.143	43
9	Norwich City	42	16	11	15	60	65	0.923	43
10	Carlisle United	42	14	13	15	58	52	1.115	41
11	Crystal Palace	42	14	11	17	56	56	1.000	39
12	Bolton Wanderers	42	13	13	16	60	63	0.952	39

Rules for classification: 1) Points; 2) Goal average; 3) Goals scored

==== Matches ====
Match Day	Date	Opponent	H/A	Score	Carlisle United Scorer(s)	Attendance
1	19 August	Hull City	A	0–1		
2	23 August	Blackburn Rovers	A	0–1		
3	26 August	Middlesbrough	H	2–2		
4	29 August	Blackburn Rovers	H	1–0		
5	2 September	Bristol City	A	0–1		
6	5 September	Rotherham United	H	4–1		
7	9 September	Birmingham City	H	1–1		
8	16 September	Bolton Wanderers	A	3–2		
9	23 September	Huddersfield Town	H	2–1		
10	30 September	Ipswich Town	A	1–3		
11	7 October	Portsmouth	A	1–2		
12	14 October	Preston North End	H	4–1		
13	21 October	Charlton Athletic	A	2–2		
14	28 October	Crystal Palace	H	3–0		
15	4 November	Aston Villa	A	0–1		
16	11 November	Queen's Park Rangers	H	3–1		
17	18 November	Derby County	A	1–0		
18	25 November	Cardiff City	H	1–3		
19	2 December	Plymouth Argyle	A	1–3		
20	9 December	Norwich City	H	2–2		
21	16 December	Hull City	H	1–1		
22	23 December	Middlesbrough	A	0–4		
23	26 December	Blackpool	A	1–1		
24	30 December	Blackpool	H	1–3		
25	6 January	Bristol City	H	0–0		
26	13 January	Birmingham City	A	3–1		
27	20 January	Bolton Wanderers	H	3–0		
28	3 February	Huddersfield Town	A	1–1		
29	10 February	Ipswich Town	H	4–1		
30	23 February	Portsmouth	H	1–1		
31	2 March	Preston North End	A	2–0		
32	16 March	Charlton Athletic	H	0–0		
33	23 March	Crystal Palace	A	1–1		
34	30 March	Aston Villa	H	1–2		
35	6 April	Queen's Park Rangers	A	0–1		
36	13 April	Derby County	H	1–1		
37	15 April	Millwall	A	0–1		
38	16 April	Millwall	H	1–1		
39	20 April	Cardiff City	A	0–1		
40	27 April	Plymouth Argyle	H	2–0		
41	4 May	Norwich City	A	1–2		
42	11 May	Rotherham United	A	2–1		

=== Football League Cup ===
Round	Date	Opponent	H/A	Score	Carlisle United Scorer(s)	Attendance
R2	13 September	Workington	H	0–2		

=== FA Cup ===
Round	Date	Opponent	H/A	Score	Carlisle United Scorer(s)	Attendance
R3	27 January	Newcastle United	A	1–0		56,569
R4	17 February	Everton	H	0–2		25,000
