= 1968–69 Carlisle United F.C. season =

Carlisle United F.C.
1968–69 season
- Manager: Tim Ward; Bob Stokoe
- Stadium: Brunton Park
- Second Division: 12th
- FA Cup: Third round
- League Cup: Third round

For the 1968–69 season, Carlisle United F.C. competed in Football League Second Division.

== Results & fixtures ==
=== Football League Second Division ===
==== League table ====
Pos	Team	Pld	W	D	L	GF	GA	GAv	Pts
10	Millwall	42	17	9	16	57	49	1.163	43
11	Hull City	42	13	16	13	59	52	1.135	42
12	Carlisle United	42	16	10	16	46	49	0.939	42
13	Norwich City	42	15	10	17	53	56	0.946	40
14	Preston North End	42	12	15	15	38	44	0.864	39

Rules for classification: 1) Points; 2) Goal average; 3) Goals scored

==== Matches ====
Match Day	Date	Opponent	H/A	Score	Carlisle United Scorer(s)	Attendance
1	10 August	Bury	A	2–3		
2	13 August	Portsmouth	H	0–0		
3	17 August	Charlton Athletic	H	1–1		
4	24 August	Middlesbrough	A	0–1		
5	27 August	Oxford United	H	0–2		
6	31 August	Huddersfield Town	H	0–0		
7	7 September	Crystal Palace	A	0–5		
8	14 September	Norwich City	H	0–4		
9	21 September	Cardiff City	A	1–2		
10	28 September	Birmingham City	H	2–3		
11	30 September	Preston North End	A	2–2		
12	5 October	Bolton Wanderers	H	1–1		
13	9 October	Oxford United	A	1–0		
14	12 October	Blackburn Rovers	A	2–0		
15	19 October	Blackpool	H	1–0		
16	26 October	Aston Villa	A	0–0		
17	4 November	Hull City	H	1–0		
18	9 November	Sheffield United	A	1–0		
19	16 November	Fulham	H	2–0		
20	23 November	Derby County	A	3–3		
21	30 November	Bristol City	H	3–0		
22	7 December	Millwall	A	1–1		
23	14 December	Blackburn Rovers	H	4–1		
24	21 December	Blackpool	A	0–1		
25	26 December	Bolton Wanderers	A	1–0		
26	28 December	Aston Villa	H	0–1		
27	11 January	Hull City	A	2–1		
28	18 January	Sheffield United	H	0–1		
29	1 February	Fulham	A	2–0		
30	15 February	Bristol City	A	0–3		
31	22 February	Millwall	H	1–0		
32	1 March	Bury	H	2–0		
33	8 March	Charlton Athletic	A	1–1		
34	11 March	Derby County	H	1–1		
35	15 March	Middlesbrough	H	3–0		
36	22 March	Huddersfield Town	A	0–2		
37	29 March	Crystal Palace	H	1–2		
38	5 April	Birmingham City	A	0–3		
39	7 April	Preston North End	H	1–0		
40	9 April	Portsmouth	A	1–2		
41	12 April	Cardiff City	H	1–0		
42	19 April	Norwich City	A	1–2		

=== Football League Cup ===
Round	Date	Opponent	H/A	Score	Carlisle United Scorer(s)	Attendance
R2	4 September	Cardiff City	H	2–0		
R3	24 September	Leicester City	H	0–3		

=== FA Cup ===
Round	Date	Opponent	H/A	Score	Carlisle United Scorer(s)	Attendance
R3	4 January	Chelsea	A	0–2		
