= 1966–67 Carlisle United F.C. season =

Carlisle United F.C.
1966–67 season
- Manager: Alan Ashman; Tim Ward
- Stadium: Brunton Park
- Second Division: 3rd
- FA Cup: Fourth round
- League Cup: Fifth round

For the 1966–67 season, Carlisle United F.C. competed in Football League Division Two.

== Results and fixtures ==
=== Football League Second Division ===
==== League table ====
| Pos | Team | Pld | W | D | L | GF | GA | GAv | Pts | Qualification or relegation |
|---|---|---|---|---|---|---|---|---|---|---|
| 1 | Coventry City (C, P) | 42 | 23 | 13 | 6 | 74 | 43 | 1.721 | 59 | Promotion to the First Division |
| 2 | Wolverhampton Wanderers (P) | 42 | 25 | 8 | 9 | 88 | 48 | 1.833 | 58 | Promotion to the First Division |
| 3 | Carlisle United | 42 | 23 | 6 | 13 | 71 | 54 | 1.315 | 52 | |
| 4 | Blackburn Rovers | 42 | 19 | 13 | 10 | 56 | 46 | 1.217 | 51 | |
| 5 | Ipswich Town | 42 | 17 | 16 | 9 | 70 | 54 | 1.296 | 50 | |

Rules for classification: 1) Points; 2) Goal average; 3) Goals scored
(C) Champions; (P) Promoted

==== Matches ====
| Match Day | Date | Opponent | H/A | Score | Carlisle United scorer(s) | Attendance |
|---|---|---|---|---|---|---|
| 1 | 20 August | Crystal Palace | A | 2–4 | | |
| 2 | 23 August | Derby County | H | 0–0 | | |
| 3 | 27 August | Huddersfield Town | H | 2–1 | | |
| 4 | 31 August | Derby County | A | 1–0 | | |
| 5 | 3 September | Cardiff City | A | 2–4 | | |
| 6 | 7 September | Bolton Wanderers | A | 0–3 | | |
| 7 | 10 September | Wolverhampton Wanderers | H | 1–3 | | |
| 8 | 17 September | Ipswich Town | A | 2–1 | | |
| 9 | 24 September | Bristol City | H | 2–1 | | |
| 10 | 27 September | Norwich City | H | 1–0 | | |
| 11 | 1 October | Bury | A | 2–0 | | |
| 12 | 8 October | Coventry City | H | 2–1 | | |
| 13 | 15 October | Norwich City | A | 0–2 | | |
| 14 | 22 October | Birmingham City | H | 2–0 | | |
| 15 | 29 October | Portsmouth | A | 1–2 | | |
| 16 | 5 November | Hull City | H | 2–0 | | |
| 17 | 12 November | Plymouth Argyle | A | 2–1 | | |
| 18 | 19 November | Northampton Town | H | 2–0 | | |
| 19 | 26 November | Millwall | A | 1–2 | | |
| 20 | 3 December | Rotherham United | H | 2–3 | | |
| 21 | 10 December | Preston North End | A | 3–2 | | |
| 22 | 17 December | Crystal Palace | H | 3–0 | | |
| 23 | 26 December | Blackburn Rovers | H | 1–2 | | |
| 24 | 27 December | Blackburn Rovers | A | 1–3 | | |
| 25 | 31 December | Huddersfield Town | A | 1–1 | | |
| 26 | 7 January | Cardiff City | H | 3–0 | | |
| 27 | 14 January | Wolverhampton Wanderers | A | 1–1 | | |
| 28 | 21 January | Ipswich Town | H | 2–1 | | |
| 29 | 4 February | Bristol City | A | 0–3 | | |
| 30 | 11 February | Bury | H | 2–0 | | |
| 31 | 25 February | Coventry City | A | 1–2 | | |
| 32 | 4 March | Portsmouth | H | 5–1 | | |
| 33 | 18 March | Birmingham City | A | 2–1 | | |
| 34 | 24 March | Charlton Athletic | A | 0–1 | | |
| 35 | 28 March | Charlton Athletic | H | 1–0 | | |
| 36 | 1 April | Hull City | A | 2–1 | | |
| 37 | 8 April | Plymouth Argyle | H | 0–0 | | |
| 38 | 15 April | Northampton Town | A | 3–3 | | |
| 39 | 22 April | Millwall | H | 2–1 | | |
| 40 | 29 April | Rotherham United | A | 3–2 | | |
| 41 | 6 May | Preston North End | H | 1–1 | | |
| 42 | 13 May | Bolton Wanderers | H | 6–1 | | |

=== Football League Cup ===
| Round | Date | Opponent | H/A | Score | Carlisle United scorer(s) | Attendance |
|---|---|---|---|---|---|---|
| R2 | 14 September | Tranmere Rovers | H | 1–1 | | |
| R2 R | 21 September | Tranmere Rovers | A | 2–0 | | |
| R3 | 5 October | Southampton | A | 3–3 | | |
| R3 R | 12 October | Southampton | H | 2–1 (aet) | | |
| R4 | 26 October | Blackburn Rovers | H | 4–0 | | |
| R5 | 7 December | Queen's Park Rangers | H | 1–2 | | |

=== FA Cup ===
| Round | Date | Opponent | H/A | Score | Carlisle United scorer(s) | Attendance |
|---|---|---|---|---|---|---|
| R3 | 28 January | Blackburn Rovers | A | 2–1 | | |
| R4 | 18 February | Ipswich Town | A | 0–2 | | |
