= Derek Nippard =

English football referee (1931–2017)

Personal information
- Born: 1931 Christchurch, Dorset (then Hampshire), England
- Died: 28 July 2017 (aged 86) Royal Bournemouth Hospital, Bournemouth, Dorset, England

Sport
- Sport: Football

Derek Nippard (1931 – 28 July 2017) was an English football referee. He was the referee at the 1978 FA Cup Final.

Nippard was a referee for Cardiff City F.C. in the 1967–68 and 1969–70 seasons.

== See also ==
- List of FIFA international referees
