= John Toshack =

Welsh footballer and manager (born 1949)

John Toshack MBE
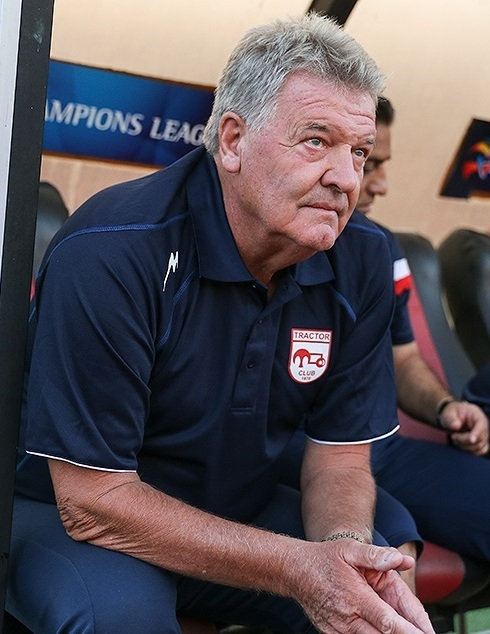
- Toshack in August 2018 as manager of Tractor

Personal information
- Full name: John Benjamin Toshack
- Date of birth: 22 March 1949 (age 77)
- Place of birth: Cardiff, Wales
- Height: 6 ft 1 in (1.85 m)
- Position: Striker

Senior career*
Years	Team	Apps	(Gls)
1965–1970	Cardiff City	162	(74)
1970–1978	Liverpool	172	(74)
1978–1984	Swansea City	63	(24)
Total		397	(172)

International career
1968–1969	Wales Under-23	4	(0)
1969–1980	Wales	40	(13)

Managerial career
- 1978–1983: Swansea City
- 1983–1984: Swansea City
- 1984–1985: Sporting CP
- 1985–1989: Real Sociedad
- 1989–1990: Real Madrid
- 1991–1994: Real Sociedad
- 1994: Wales
- 1995–1997: Deportivo La Coruña
- 1997–1999: Beşiktaş
- 1999: Real Madrid
- 2000: Saint-Étienne
- 2000–2002: Real Sociedad
- 2002–2003: Catania
- 2004: Real Murcia
- 2004–2010: Wales
- 2011–2012: Macedonia
- 2013: Khazar Lankaran
- 2014–2016: Wydad Casablanca
- 2018: Tractor
- * Club domestic league appearances and goals

John Benjamin Toshack MBE (born 22 March 1949) is a Welsh former professional football player and manager.

He began his playing career as a teenager with his hometown club Cardiff City, becoming the youngest player to make an appearance for the side when he made his debut in 1965. After establishing himself in the first-team, he went on to make over 200 appearances and scored 100 goals in all competitions after forming a striking partnership with Brian Clark.

In 1970, he joined First Division side Liverpool, where he formed a noted forward partnership with Kevin Keegan and Steve Heighway that helped the club to win two league titles, the European Cup, the UEFA Cup on two occasions, the FA Cup and the UEFA Super Cup. His partnership with Keegan was so effective that the two were described as telepathic. Mounting injuries eventually led to him securing his release from Liverpool to join Swansea City as player-manager in March 1978. He led the club to three promotions in four seasons, elevating them from the Fourth Division to the First Division in a feat that led former Liverpool manager Bill Shankly to describe him as the "manager of the century". During his career, he scored over 150 goals in the Football League in more than 350 appearances and also represented Wales at international level, winning 40 caps and scoring 13 goals.

He resigned from Swansea in 1984 after suffering relegation and embarked on a managerial career abroad, taking charge of Sporting CP in Portugal and later Spanish side Real Sociedad, winning the Copa del Rey in 1987. Two years later, he was appointed manager of Real Madrid and led them to a fifth consecutive La Liga title with a record total of points and goals scored. However, a disappointing start to the following season resulted in his dismissal in November 1990 and he returned to Real Sociedad. In 1994, he was appointed part-time manager of Wales alongside his job at Real Sociedad but resigned from the role after just 47 days having been in charge for one match, citing the strong support for former manager Terry Yorath among fans and a "political war" as reasons. In 1995, he was appointed manager of Deportivo La Coruña during the club's "Super Depor" era, reaching the Cup Winners' Cup semifinals in his first season before departing acrimoniously in February 1997.

After a spell in Turkey with Beşiktaş, he returned to Real Madrid for a second time but was sacked ten months later after refusing to retract criticism he had made of his players in a press conference following a defeat. In 2004, he was appointed as manager of Wales for a second time and remained with the side for six years, presiding over three ultimately unsuccessful qualifying campaigns. He later managed Macedonia and Azerbaijani side Khazar Lankaran before managing outside Europe for the first time in his career with Moroccan side Wydad Casablanca and Tractor of Iran.

== Early life ==
John Toshack was born on 22 March 1949 in Cardiff, Wales, and grew up on Northumberland Street in the Canton area of the city. His father George was from Dunfermline in Scotland and worked as a carpenter. He moved to Wales while serving in the RAF, being stationed at MOD St Athan, and met Toshack's mother Joan, whom he later married.

As a child, Toshack attended Radnor Road Primary School, where he first played football for ten minutes in a school trial match, and later Canton High School for Boys. As a teenager, Toshack also played rugby and cricket and was regarded as a promising outside-half before a fractured shoulder suffered playing rugby led to him focusing on football. He left the school at the age of sixteen with O-levels in French and history.

== Playing career ==
=== Cardiff City ===
While at school, Toshack was selected to represent Cardiff Boys, where he played alongside Terry Yorath. In 1963, Toshack scored in every match he played for the side and broke the team's scoring record with his 33rd goal in eleven matches as Cardiff defeated Swansea 2–0 in the Welsh schools divisional final. He was later selected to represent the Wales under-15 side.

In 1965, he joined his hometown club Cardiff City, signing for them as a 16-year-old on a contract worth £12 a week with an £8 appearance bonus and a £4 win bonus. In his early days at the club, he was in charge of cleaning the boots of John Charles. He became the youngest ever player to play in a senior match for the club when he came on as a substitute in place of Graham Coldrick to make a goalscoring debut during a 3–1 win over Leyton Orient on 13 November 1965 at the age of 16 years and 236 days, a record which stood for 41 years until it was broken by Aaron Ramsey in 2007. His performance during his debut persuaded manager Jimmy Scoular to promote him to the starting line-up for the following match and Toshack found the net again, scoring a brace during a 4–3 victory over Middlesbrough. In his first season in professional football, he scored six goals during nine appearances in all competitions.

Establishing himself in the side over the next few years, Toshack rejected a £70,000 move to Fulham when he was 18 as he felt he was too inexperienced to play in the First Division and would learn more by playing under Cardiff manager Scoular. He scored his first career hat-trick in January 1968 in an 8–0 win over Ebbw Vale in the Welsh Cup, and went on to form one of the most prolific partnerships in the club's history alongside Brian Clark. In the 1968–69 season, he scored 31 goals in all competitions, including three goals in a two-legged Welsh Cup final against Swansea City, finishing as the club's top scorer and the highest goalscorer in the Second Division. He scored two further hat-tricks for Cardiff, in 1969 against Queens Park Rangers and in 1970 against Hull City.

In November 1970, several days after scoring his 100th goal in all competitions for Cardiff during a 2–1 victory over French side Nantes in the UEFA Cup Winners' Cup, Toshack completed a transfer to Liverpool. The club had made several previous offers for Toshack that had been rejected however, the Cardiff City board stated that they had left the decision up to the player who chose to move clubs. Cardiff manager Scoular and board member George Edwards both opposed the transfer, but were unable to convince chairman Fred Dewey to block the move.

=== Liverpool ===
The deal was completed on 11 November 1970, Liverpool manager Bill Shankly paying £111,000 for the striker, a club record fee at the time. £100,000 went to Cardiff for the sale of the player while the Football League received £5,500 for the transfer and Toshack himself received the remaining £5,500. Liverpool had resurrected a potential deal for Toshack after an attempt to sign Huddersfield Town forward Frank Worthington collapsed after he failed a medical. He made his debut three days later on 14 November 1970 in a goalless league draw with Coventry City at Anfield. His first goal came a week later on 21 November in a Merseyside derby at Anfield. With the game 0–0 at half-time, Everton scored two early goals just after the start of the second half before Steve Heighway scored from an acute angle for Liverpool. In the 76th minute, Toshack headed a goal from a Heighway cross that turned the game around; then Chris Lawler volleyed home, after Toshack had headed on an Alec Lindsay cross, for the 84th-minute winner.

Tosh was a wonderful player to play alongside. He aerial ability was fantastic and I always knew that he was going to win the high balls. From then on it was just a question of me reading which way the ball was going to go and from those situations we created many chances.

— Kevin Keegan commenting on his partnership with Toshack at Liverpool

In his first season at Anfield, Toshack scored seven times in all competitions but his noted aerial ability proved to be a key asset in Liverpool's style of play as it helped the side reach the 1971 FA Cup Final, losing 2–1 to Arsenal. The following year, Kevin Keegan joined Liverpool from Scunthorpe United and the pair struck up a successful partnership, which was often referred to as being telepathic, with Toshack winning balls in the air and Keegan finishing the knock downs.

After defeat in the 1971 FA Cup final and missing out on the league title by a single point in 1972, Toshack won his first major honour with Liverpool in 1973 despite missing 20 league matches due to injury. Don Revie's Leeds United visited Anfield on Easter Monday for a match involving two of the three 1972–73 Football League title challengers. Two minutes after the break Peter Cormack put Liverpool ahead before Keegan added a late second to seal the win. With Arsenal only drawing in their match against Southampton, Liverpool duly closed out the title with a final game 0–0 draw against Leicester City to claim their first major trophy since 1966. Toshack also helped the side to win the 1972–73 UEFA Cup against German team Borussia Mönchengladbach. The 1973 UEFA Cup Final first leg at Anfield was abandoned due to a torrential downpour after 27 minutes and rescheduled to be played again the next day. The 27 minutes that had been played had given Liverpool manager Bill Shankly an insight into Borussia Mönchengladbach's defensive vulnerability in the air. To exploit this, he brought tall forward Toshack into the starting team demoting the small build of Brian Hall to appearing only as a late substitute. Keegan profited with two goals set up by Toshack headers in a 3–0 win. Liverpool lost 2–0 away in the second leg but won the tie 3–2 on aggregate.

Toshack also played in the 1974 FA Cup Final when Liverpool defeated Newcastle United 3–0, having scored winning goals in the quarter and semi-final matches against Bristol City and Leicester City. However, he found himself out of the first-team at the start of the following season after the club signed Ray Kennedy from Arsenal. Frustrated with the situation, Toshack looked to move and the club accepted a £160,000 bid from Leicester City in November 1974. Although he stated of his desire to remain with Liverpool, he was reluctant to be only playing reserve matches. However, the deal later collapsed after he failed a medical and, at the age of 25, Toshack was told by specialist doctors that he only had around twelve months left to play due to mounting injuries. He was able to force his way back into the first-team soon after, but his training time was restricted in an effort to prolong his playing career.

He won a further league and UEFA Cup double in 1976 and enjoyed his most prolific season with Liverpool, scoring 23 goals in all competitions. He ended his medal haul with a further league title in 1977 but increasing injury concerns limited his appearances and a proposed £60,000 transfer to Belgian side Anderlecht broke down after a medical discovered calcification in some muscle tissue. Toshack eventually negotiated his release from his contract at Liverpool in order to move into management. During his time with Liverpool, Toshack scored 96 goals in 247 appearances in all competitions. He was voted in at No.34 on the Liverpool website poll 100 Players Who Shook The Kop, in which thousands of fans worldwide voted for their top 100 Liverpool players.

== International career ==
Toshack played for Wales at schoolboy and under-23 level before making his senior debut on 26 March 1969 in a 1–1 draw with West Germany. He scored his first senior goal in his following match, a 2–1 defeat to East Germany a month later. He was part of the Welsh side that topped their qualifying group for UEFA Euro 1976, scoring three times during qualifying, before losing a two-legged play-off match against Yugoslavia.

He went on to earn 40 caps and scored 13 goals, including a hat trick against Scotland in the 1979 British Home Championship.

== Managerial career ==
=== Swansea City ===
Having secured his release from his contract at Liverpool, Toshack looked to move into management and approached his former club Cardiff City over a coaching position but was rejected by manager Jimmy Andrews who questioned his qualifications for the role. Toshack instead received a phone call from Swansea City chairman Malcolm Struel and was invited to a meeting at the club. Following this, he was appointed player-manager of Fourth Division club Swansea on 1 March 1978, becoming the youngest manager in the Football League at the age of 29. Succeeding Harry Griffiths who stepped down to become his assistant, Toshack's appointment was seen as a significant coup for Swansea and the crowd for his first match in charge, a 3–3 draw with Watford, more than doubled from the club's previous home match with over 15,000 in attendance.

He overhauled numerous aspects of the club's day-to-day routine including changing players' diets, moderating their alcohol intake and revising travel arrangements for away matches. He was an immediate success at the Vetch Field, winning promotion from the Fourth Division in his first season in charge after finishing third. However, the club's celebrations were muted following the death of Griffiths from a heart attack prior to a match against Scunthorpe United in April 1978. Toshack praised Griffiths for his role in helping the club win promotion, stating: "Most of the hard work had been done [...], chiefly by Harry. Gaining promotion would be a memorial to him".

The following season, Toshack convinced several of his former Liverpool teammates, such as Ian Callaghan, Phil Boersma and Tommy Smith, to join the club. Smith and Callaghan had both received offers to stay with Liverpool, although with limited playing time, but approached Toshack over a move and would train at Liverpool's Melwood training ground before travelling to Swansea for matchdays. Toshack led the club to a second consecutive promotion in 1979, sealing their place in the Second Division with a 2–1 win over Chesterfield on the final day of the season with Toshack himself scoring the winning goal that confirmed promotion after bringing himself on as a substitute.

After finishing mid-table in their first season in the Second Division, Swansea claimed a third promotion in four seasons in 1981 after beating Preston North End 3–1 on 2 May 1981 and won the Welsh Cup for the first time in fifteen years soon after by defeating Hereford United. After achieving promotion, Toshack's former Liverpool manager Bill Shankly heaped praise on his achievements, stating "he's done a remarkable job, I would say he's possibly manager of the century." Once they reached the top flight, Swansea were predicted by many to be relegated, but in their first match in the First Division they claimed a 5–1 victory over Leeds United after a hat-trick from newly arrived club-record signing Bob Latchford. In recognition of his achievements at the club, Toshack was awarded an MBE midway through the season. Swansea topped the league at several stages of the season, leading the division with only three months remaining, but injuries to key-players Latchford and another former Liverpool teammate of Toshack's Ray Kennedy, saw a downturn in results and they won just one of their final six matches before finishing their first campaign in the top flight in sixth position. During this period, he was told by the Liverpool board that he was their choice to replace current manager Bob Paisley when he chose to retire. Toshack had openly coveted the position, stating: "When I went to Swansea the thing I wanted in the long term was to end up at Liverpool". However, Paisley remained longer than expected and the position eventually went to Joe Fagan. Swansea were relegated the following year as the club suffered financial difficulties after relatively big spending under Toshack's tenure and then suffered a second successive relegation. He resigned in October 1983 but returned eight weeks later, remaining with the club for a further three months before departing again in March 1984. The heavy spending during Toshack's years at Swansea were often cited as a key factor in the severe financial issues that affected the club, being issued with a winding up order due to unpaid debts in December 1985.

=== European management ===
In 1984, Toshack was appointed manager of the Portuguese side Sporting CP, but he only lasted one season in the post, during which he led the team to second place in the league. He instead moved to Spain, taking a position as manager of Real Sociedad where he led the side to victory in the 1986–87 Copa del Rey and were the league runners-up in 1988.

Although their following season was disappointing, finishing the La Liga season in eleventh position, Toshack was appointed manager of Real Madrid in 1989. Madrid were reigning La Liga champions having won their fourth consecutive title the previous year and their squad was described by club president Ramón Mendoza as the "best Real Madrid side for the past 25 years". Nevertheless, Toshack strengthened defensively by adding Oscar Ruggeri and Fernando Hierro to the club's ranks, but endured a difficult start after losing to rivals Barcelona and being eliminated from the European Cup in the second round; he was also under pressure from local press, despite leading the La Liga table after ten matches. However, the side soon discovered their form and they eventually claimed the league title after scoring a record 107 league goals during the season, becoming only the second team to score 100 or more goals during a single season at the time. A disappointing start to the following season and a three-match losing streak led to him being sacked by the club after eleven matches in November 1990 and he returned to Real Sociedad, initially in an advisory role, before taking charge soon after.

In Spain, Toshack became known as "John Benjamin"–nicknamed "JB"–as there was a common misunderstanding that his middle name was a Spanish-style paternal surname. He was noted for a habit of literally translating English-language idioms into Spanish during his press conferences, to the confusion of Spanish journalists.

=== Wales national football team ===
In 1994, Toshack was appointed as manager of the Wales national team on a part-time basis, taking the job alongside his position in charge of Real Sociedad, after approaches for Terry Venables and Bobby Robson were rejected. Although the ten scheduled competitive matches the team were due to play coincided with a break in Spanish league fixtures, he stated his intention that Real Sociedad would remain his first priority if any other international matches should clash with domestic ones. He was appointed to succeed Terry Yorath, who had narrowly missed out on qualification to the 1994 FIFA World Cup and had expressed his desire to remain in the role but was not offered a new contract by the Football Association of Wales (FAW). On 9 March 1994, Toshack took charge of his first game for Wales, a 3–1 defeat to Norway at Ninian Park in Cardiff. Toshack had already come under scrutiny over his commitment to the role after arriving in Wales only two nights before the match and taking a single training session with the team beforehand. With support for Yorath still strong among Welsh fans over his dismissal by the FAW, a disappointing performance against Norway saw the team jeered off at both half and full-time and Toshack resigned from the role after just 47 days in charge. He later claimed that there was a political "war" surrounding the team following Yorath's acrimonious departure and he decided to "wash his hands" of the situation.

=== Besiktas and return to Real Madrid ===
After leaving Real Sociedad, he spent two years in charge of Deportivo de La Coruña, resigning after the board signed two players without his knowledge, before moving to Turkey to join Beşiktaş on the recommendation of Bobby Robson, finishing sixth in his first season in charge. Although Toshack led the club to victory in the Turkish Cup in 1998, he endured a difficult time at the club, as he clashed with the board on several occasions and had threatened to quit in October 1998.

In February 1999, he returned to Real Madrid following the sacking of Guus Hiddink. Madrid agreed to pay £372,671 compensation to Beşiktaş in order to secure the move. With the club floundering in sixth place upon his arrival, he immediately improved Real Madrid’s league form and eventually led the club to finish the season with a very impressive second place, securing the Champions League Group Stage qualification under Toshack. However, the start of the following season saw Madrid struggle again, and after a 3–2 victory against Rayo Vallecano due to a dramatic second half which saw Real overturn the result with three unanswered goals, as the club was stuck in eighth position, Toshack publicly criticized his players, particularly Albano Bizzarri commenting that the goalkeeper conceded goals "that made me weep". Toshack claimed that his words were meant as a motivational tactic and refused club president Lorenzo Sanz's request that he withdraw his comments, saying "there's more chance of a pig flying over the Bernabeu". The Real Madrid board dismissed him soon after and replaced him with former defensive midfielder and caretaker manager, Vicente del Bosque. Toshack would later take Madrid to court over his dismissal and was awarded over £700,000 in compensation.

He later spent a short period with French side Saint-Étienne in 2000, leaving the club for a third spell in charge of Real Sociedad. Despite pulling Saint-Étienne out of the relegation zone, the club's fortunes rapidly declined after his departure, becoming entangled in a forgery scandal which docked the club seven points to confirm its relegation at the end of the 2000–01 season. At Real Sociedad, Toshack reversed the club's declining fortunes and pulled it out of the relegation zone to finish in 13th place in his first season after having awarded the captaincy to 20–year old Xabi Alonso, who became the club's star player under Toshack. After amassing 27 points in 29 games the following season, he was sacked in March 2002.

He then had short spells with Italian team Catania from November 2002 to January 2003, in a calamitous season for the club in which it got relegated from the Serie B in a scandal known as "Caso Catania" before the decision was reversed in August 2003; this preceded another return to Spain with last–placed La Liga side Real Murcia in January 2004, failing to save the club from relegation.

=== Wales (second spell) ===
In November 2004, Toshack was appointed as manager of the Wales national team for the second time after being named as the "unanimous" choice of the FAW. He was named in a three-man shortlist for the role alongside Frenchman Philippe Troussier and former Welsh international Dean Saunders. Toshack's appointment was unpopular with some senior players with Robbie Savage claiming he could face a player mutiny if appointed. In total, seven players announced their international retirement within months of Toshack's appointment, including Savage, captain Gary Speed, who had been critical of Toshack's opinions previously, Mark Pembridge and Andy Melville. Former Wales manager Mark Hughes also questioned Toshack's suitability for the role, stating that UEFA coaching qualifications which Toshack did not possess should be considered a prerequisite for the job.

One of his first acts as manager was to place Brian Flynn in charge of Wales' various youth levels, replacing Ian Rush and Neville Southall, and the pair set about rebuilding an ageing squad and uncovering players with the eligibility to play for Wales, such as Ashley Williams. His first match in charge was a friendly against Hungary on 9 February 2005 which ended in a 2–0 win for Wales, both goals being scored by Craig Bellamy. His first competitive match in charge came one month later when they suffered a 2–0 defeat to Austria, where Toshack was blamed for making a late substitution with the match at 0–0 that allowed Austria into contention and conceded two late goals. A second defeat to Austria four days later ended Wales' slim remaining hopes of qualifying for the 2006 FIFA World Cup.

In his first full qualifying campaign, Toshack's squad was plagued by withdrawals, so much so that he chose to issue a letter to 36 Welsh players for them to show "total commitment to the cause". With the noted retirements and regular withdrawals, Toshack was forced to use a relatively youthful side for a difficult qualifying campaign in which Wales finished fifth out of seven teams and failed to qualify for UEFA Euro 2008. A defeat to Poland in February 2009 caused anger among supporters as captain Craig Bellamy clashed verbally with fans and a further defeat to Finland a month later saw the side jeered off the pitch at full-time. In October 2009, Wales were unable to fill a squad for a friendly match against Finland following four retirements in the months prior to the match. One of the players, Paul Parry, cited being made to feel like a "spare part" as the reason for his decision to make himself unavailable for selection.

Despite mounting pressure to resign, Toshack remained in charge for the start of the next qualifying campaign. However, on 5 September 2010, he offered his resignation from the Wales job following a 1–0 away defeat to Montenegro in their first Euro 2012 qualifying match. He left the job by mutual consent on 9 September 2010, although he had stated his desire to remain in the job for the two following qualifying matches. During his six-year tenure with Wales, a total of 18 players retired from international duty but he also handed debuts to numerous players, including many of the side that would go on to reach the semi-final of UEFA Euro 2016.

=== Macedonian national team ===
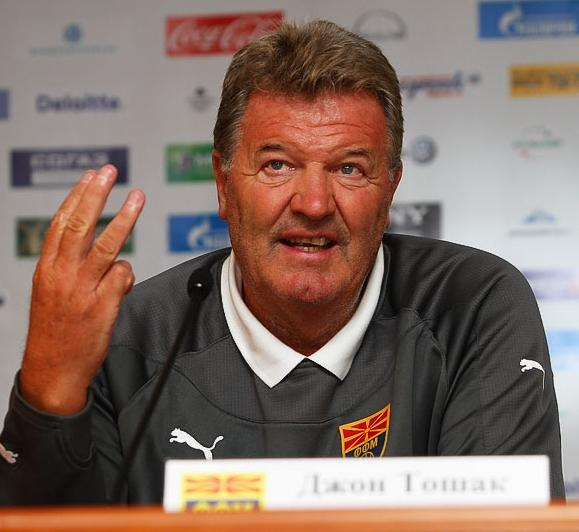
Toshack, as Macedonia manager, at a press conference in 2011

Eleven months after resigning from his role with Wales, Toshack was appointed manager of the Macedonia national football team on 7 August 2011. However, Macedonia won one of his eight matches in charge and his contract with the national side was terminated on 13 August 2012 after he refused the request of Football Federation of Macedonia president Ilčo Gjorgioski to relocate to the country.

=== Khazar Lankaran ===
On 8 March 2013, it was announced that Toshack would take over as manager of Khazar Lankaran of the Azerbaijan Premier League on 15 March 2013. At the time of his appointment, Khazar Lankaran were eighth in the league and competing in the relegation group for the final 10 games of the season. Toshack's first game in charge of Khazar Lankaran was a one all home draw against AZAL. Toshack's first win came in his second game in charge, a 1–2 away victory against bottom of the table Kəpəz. Khazar Lankaran ended the season in eighth position, with a league record under Toshack of three games out of nine won, with an equal number of three matches drawn or lost. Toshack also guided Khazar Lankaran to the final of the 2012–13 Azerbaijan Cup with a 2–1 aggregate victory over Baku in the semi-finals, resulting in a game against Premier League champions Neftchi Baku which Khazar lost 5–3 on penalties. As a result of Neftchi Baku winning both the Premier League and Cup, Khazar qualified for the UEFA Europa League. Toshack won his first trophy with Khazar Lankaran on 23 October 2013, defeating Neftchi Baku in the 2013 Azerbaijan Supercup. On 22 November 2013, Toshack resigned as manager of Khazar Lankaran, following 14 points in the first 14 games of the season, leaving Khazar in eighth place in the league.

=== Wydad Casablanca ===
On 20 June 2014, Toshack was appointed as manager of Moroccan side Wydad Casablanca. He led the club to a league title in his first season in charge and a second-place finish the following year, but on 16 September 2016, after suffering a heavy defeat to Zamalek in the first leg of the 2016 CAF Champions League semi-finals, Toshack and Wydad Casablanca parted ways.

=== Tractor ===
In June 2018, he was appointed manager of Iranian side Tractor until 2021. He left the club in September 2018.

== Personal life ==
On 7 June 1969, Toshack married Susan Bann from Grangetown, Cardiff, at the age of 20 at St John Church in Canton. After 43 years of marriage, the pair divorced in 2012 with his wife citing "unreasonable behaviour". Toshack's son Cameron is also a former professional footballer, having made five appearances for Cardiff City, and with Swansea City for the 1989–90 season.

In 1976, while playing for Liverpool, Toshack composed and published a book of poems entitled Gosh, it's Tosh.

In 1981, Toshack won the BBC Wales Sports Personality of the Year and was appointed a Member of the Order of the British Empire (MBE) for his services to football in the 1982 New Year Honours list. He was the subject of an episode of This Is Your Life in 1982 when he was surprised by Eamonn Andrews at the Roehampton Club in London.

On 27 February 2022, Toshack was reported to be seriously ill in a Spanish hospital, suffering from COVID-19. The illness left him requiring use of a wheelchair.

== Career statistics ==
Appearances and goals by club, season and competition
Club	Season	League			FA Cup		League Cup		Europe		Other		Total	
Club	Season	Division	Apps	Goals	Apps	Goals	Apps	Goals	Apps	Goals	Apps	Goals	Apps	Goals
Cardiff City	1965–66	Second Division	8	6	1	0	0	0	0	0	0	0	9	6
Cardiff City	1966–67	Second Division	23	10	0	0	2	1	–		1 (Note: Appearance in Welsh Cup)	0	26	11
Cardiff City	1967–68	Second Division	35	11	1	0	0	0	14	6	0	0	50	17
Cardiff City	1968–69	Second Division	41	22	2	0	1	0	2 (Note: Appearances in European Cup Winners' Cup)	2	5	7	51	31
Cardiff City	1969–70	Second Division	39	17	3	1	1	0	4	2	4	2	51	22
Cardiff City	1970–71	Second Division	16	8	0	0	0	0	4	5	0	0	20	13
Cardiff City	Total		162	74	7	1	4	1	24	15	10	9	207	100
Liverpool	1970–71	First Division	21	5	7	1	0	0	5 (Note: Appearances in Inter-Cities Fairs Cup)	1	–		33	7
Liverpool	1971–72	First Division	29	13	1	0	1	0	2	0	1 (Note: Appearance in FA Charity Shield)	0	34	13
Liverpool	1972–73	First Division	22	13	4	2	6	1	8 (Note: Appearances in UEFA Cup)	1	–		40	17
Liverpool	1973–74	First Division	19	5	6	3	2	2	3 (Note: Appearances in European Cup)	1	–		30	11
Liverpool	1974–75	First Division	21	12	2	0	0	0	2	0	0	0	25	12
Liverpool	1975–76	First Division	35	16	2	1	2	0	11	6	–		50	23
Liverpool	1976–77	First Division	22	10	2	1	1	0	4	1	1	1	30	13
Liverpool	1977–78	First Division	3	0	0	0	1	0	1	0	0	0	9	0
Liverpool	Total		172	74	24	8	13	3	36	10	2	1	247	96
Swansea City	1977–78	Fourth Division	13	6	0	0	0	0	–		0	0	13	6
Swansea City	1978–79	Third Division	28	13					–				34	14
Swansea City	1979–80	Second Division	16	5					–				22	9
Swansea City	1980–81	Second Division	3	0					–				5	0
Swansea City	1981–82	First Division	0	0	0	0	0	0	–		–		0	0
Swansea City	1982–83	First Division	0	0	0	0	0	0	–		–		0	0
Swansea City	1983–84	Second Division	3	0					–				4	1
Swansea City	Total		63	24					–				78	30
Total			397	172	31	9	17	4	60	25	12	10	532	220

== Managerial statistics ==
Team	From	To	Record				
Team	From	To	G	W	D	L	Win %
Swansea City	1 March 1978	8 June 1984	326	128	75	123	39.26
Sporting CP	1 July 1984	19 May 1985	40	25	12	3	62.50
Real Sociedad	1 July 1985	8 May 1989	181	84	45	52	46.41
Real Madrid	1 July 1989	19 November 1990	64	41	15	8	64.06
Real Sociedad	1 July 1991	21 November 1994	141	49	41	51	34.75
Wales (interim)	9 March 1994	9 March 1994	1	0	0	1	0.00
Deportivo La Coruña	1 July 1995	10 February 1997	80	33	20	27	41.25
Beşiktaş	1 July 1997	23 February 1999	80	41	21	18	51.25
Real Madrid	24 February 1999	17 November 1999	37	19	9	9	51.35
Saint-Étienne	6 October 2000	21 December 2000	12	5	2	5	41.67
Real Sociedad	22 December 2000	12 March 2002	52	16	13	23	30.77
Catania	9 November 2002	28 January 2003	10	4	0	6	40.00
Real Murcia	20 January 2004	30 June 2004	18	4	1	13	22.22
Wales	1 January 2005	4 September 2010	53	22	8	23	41.51
North Macedonia	2 September 2011	30 May 2012	8	1	4	3	12.50
Khazar Lankaran	1 March 2013	26 July 2013	33	12	9	12	36.36
Wydad Casablanca	1 June 2014	16 September 2016	83	42	26	15	50.60
Tractor	9 June 2018	16 September 2018	7	2	4	1	28.57
Total			1,226	528	305	393	43.07

== Honours ==
=== Player ===
Cardiff City

- Welsh Cup: 1967–68, 1968–69

Liverpool

- Football League First Division: 1972–73, 1975–76, 1976–77
- FA Cup: 1973–74; runner-up: 1970–71
- FA Charity Shield: 1976
- European Cup: 1976–77
- UEFA Cup: 1972–73, 1975–76
- UEFA Super Cup: 1977

=== Player-manager ===
Swansea City

- Football League Fourth Division third-place promotion: 1977–78
- Football League Third Division third-place promotion: 1978–79
- Football League Second Division third-place promotion: 1980–81
- Welsh Cup: 1980–81, 1981–82, 1982–83

=== Manager ===
Real Sociedad

- Copa del Rey: 1986–87

Real Madrid

- La Liga: 1989–90

Deportivo

- Supercopa de España: 1995

Beşiktaş

- Turkish Cup: 1997–98
- Turkish Super Cup: 1998

Khazar Lankaran

- Azerbaijan Supercup: 2013

Wydad Athletic Club

- Botola: 2014–15

=== Individual honours ===
- La Liga Coach of the Year – Don Balón Award: 1989, 1990

== See also ==
- List of football managers with the most matches
