= Ted Hemsley =

English footballer and cricketer

Personal information
- Full name: Edward John Orton Hemsley
- Date of birth: 1 September 1943 (age 83)
- Place of birth: Stoke-on-Trent, England
- Position: Left back

Youth career
- 1958–1960: Shrewsbury Town

Senior career*
Years	Team	Apps	(Gls)
1961–1968	Shrewsbury Town	235	(21)
1968–1977	Sheffield United	247	(7)
1977–1979	Doncaster Rovers	32	(1)
Total		514	(29)
- Cricket career
Cricket information
- Batting: Right-handed
- Bowling: Right-arm medium
Career statistics
Competition	First-class	List A
Matches	243	219
Runs scored	9,740	4,023
Batting average	29.33	22.60
100s/50s	8/53	0/17
Top score	176*	95*
Balls bowled	5,147	2961
Wickets	70	73
Bowling average	35.67	30.15
5 wickets in innings	0	0
10 wickets in match	0	0
Best bowling	3/5	4/42
Catches/stumpings	180/–	65/–
- Source: Cricinfo, 11 May 2020
- * Club domestic league appearances and goals

Edward John Orton Hemsley (born 1 September 1943) is an English former professional footballer, playing at left-back for Sheffield United and Shrewsbury Town. He was also a first-class cricketer for Worcestershire.

== Football career ==
Hemsley was born in Stoke-on-Trent, and was still a schoolboy when he signed professional terms with Shrewsbury Town in 1961. He made 235 league appearances for the Shrews with 21 league goals. In 1968, Sheffield United appointed Arthur Rowley as manager, who had spent the previous ten years in charge at Shrewsbury. Rowley's first signing was to be his old club captain: Hemsley.

He was given his chance in the starting line-up at left-back and soon made the position his own. His debut for Sheffield United was against Millwall at Bramall Lane in 1968 in a 1–0 victory. He was a regular in the team over the next few years, and played 40 matches (out of a possible 42) when the Blades won promotion to the First Division in 1970–71.

He played for Sheffield United for 9 years; his final appearance was at Ewood Park against Blackburn Rovers on 5 March 1977. In total, he made 247 league appearances for Sheffield United, scoring 7 goals. He finished his footballing career with Doncaster Rovers, making 32 league appearances over two seasons.

== Cricket career ==
Hemsley was a right-hand batsman. As a bowler he was a right-arm medium pace. He played first-class cricket for Worcestershire between 1962 and 1982. He was mentioned as a possible England batsman when he helped Worcestershire, for whom he played 243 first-class games and 219 one-dayers, to the County Championship in 1964. In total, Hemsley scored 9740 first-class runs for Worcestershire. He also (uniquely) played cricket on his home football ground, Worcs v Yorkshire at Bramall Lane

His younger brother, Colin Hemsley, played List A cricket for Shropshire.
