= Barry Swallow =

English footballer (1942–2026)

Personal information
- Full name: Ernest Barry Swallow
- Date of birth: 2 July 1942
- Place of birth: Arksey, West Riding of Yorkshire, England
- Date of death: 20 October 2026 (aged 84)
- Position: Defender

Senior career*
Years	Team	Apps	(Gls)
1959–1962	Doncaster Rovers	51	(10)
1962–1964	Crewe Alexandra	14	(0)
1964–1967	Barnsley	96	(1)
1967–1969	Bradford City	85	(7)
1969–1976	York City	269	(21)
Total		515	(39)

Managerial career
- 1982: York City (caretaker)
- 1988: York City (caretaker)
- * Club domestic league appearances and goals

Ernest Barry Swallow (2 July 1942 – 20 October 2026) was an English professional footballer.

== Early life and career ==
Ernest Barry Swallow was born on 2 July 1942 in Arksey, West Riding of Yorkshire. He started his career as a junior with Doncaster Rovers, turning professional in July 1959. He joined Crewe Alexandra in 1962 and played for them in their promotion season of 1962–63.

Swallow moved to Barnsley in July 1964 and then moved to Bradford City for £3,000 in February 1967, where he was in the side which gained promotion in the 1968–69 season.

He signed for York City for £3,000 in October 1969. He helped the club gain promotion in both the 1970–71 and 1973–74 seasons, and captained the club after they made it to the Second Division. He made a total of 312 appearances for the club.

Swallow became a director of York City in 1981 and twice served as caretaker manager.

== Death ==
Swallow died on 20 October 2026, aged 84.
