= John Shepherd (footballer, born 1945) =

English footballer

Personal information
- Full name: John Arthur Shepherd
- Date of birth: 20 September 1945 (age 81)
- Place of birth: Maltby, West Riding of Yorkshire, England
- Height: 5 ft 8 in (1.73 m)
- Positions: Midfielder; inside forward

Senior career*
Years	Team	Apps	(Gls)
1966–1968	Rotherham United	22	(2)
1968–1969	York City	5	(0)
1969	→ Scarborough (loan)		
1969–1971	Oxford United	11	(1)
- Hereford United
Total		38	(3)
- * Club domestic league appearances and goals

John Arthur Shepherd (born 20 September 1945) is an English former professional footballer who played as a midfielder or as an inside forward in the Football League for Rotherham United, York City and Oxford United, in non-League football for Scarborough and Hereford United.
