= Worcestershire County Football Association =

Area sporting organization with 19th century origins

- Formation: 1879
- Purpose: Football Association
- Headquarters: Worcester
- Chairman: Roy Northall
- Website: www.worcestershirefa.com

The Worcestershire County Football Association, also simply known as Worcestershire FA, is the governing body of football in the county of Worcestershire, England. It was founded in 1879, under the auspices of the Birmingham County Football Association, but earned representation the Football Association Council in its own right in 1912.

The Worcestershire FA runs a number of cups at different levels for teams all across Worcestershire, including competitions for senior men's teams, ladies teams, Sunday teams and junior competitions from Under-14 level to Under-18 level.
