= Ian MacKenzie (footballer) =

English footballer

Personal information
- Full name: Ian Stanley MacKenzie
- Date of birth: 27 September 1950
- Place of birth: Rotherham, England
- Date of death: 2018 (aged 67–68)
- Position: Central defender

Senior career*
Years	Team	Apps	(Gls)
1969–1975	Sheffield United	45	(1)
1974–1975	→ Southend United (loan)	7	(0)
1975–1978	Mansfield Town	70	(1)
1978	Alfreton Town		
Total		122	(2)
- * Club domestic league appearances and goals

Ian Stanley MacKenzie (27 September 1950 – 2018) was an English professional footballer who played in the Football League for Mansfield Town, Sheffield United and Southend United.

After his retirement in 1978, MacKenzie was the landlord at Mansfield's Eagle Tavern.
