= Bryn Jones (footballer, born 1948) =

Welsh footballer

Personal information
- Date of birth: 8 February 1948 (age 78)
- Place of birth: Llandrindod Wells, Wales
- Position: Midfielder

Youth career
- Cardiff City

Senior career*
Years	Team	Apps	(Gls)
1966–1969	Cardiff City	3	(0)
1968–1969	→ Newport County (loan)	13	(1)
1969–1975	Bristol Rovers	90	(7)
- Yeovil Town
Total		106	(7)
- * Club domestic league appearances and goals

Bryn Jones (born 8 February 1948) is a Welsh former professional footballer who played as a midfielder.

== Career ==
Born in Llandrindod Wells, Jones played for Cardiff City, Newport County, Bristol Rovers and Yeovil Town.
