= Cliff Jackson (footballer) =

English footballer (1941–2018)

Personal information
- Date of birth: 3 September 1941
- Place of birth: Swindon, England
- Date of death: 22 May 2018 (aged 76)
- Position: Forward

Youth career
- ?–1958: Swindon Town

Senior career*
Years	Team	Apps	(Gls)
1958–1963	Swindon Town	91	(30)
1963–1966	Plymouth Argyle	72	(19)
1966–1970	Crystal Palace	106	(26)
1970–1974	Torquay United	127	(13)
1974–?	Cambridge City		
Total		396	(88)

International career
- England Schoolboys
- * Club domestic league appearances and goals

Cliff Jackson (3 September 1941 – 22 May 2018) was an English professional footballer who played as a forward. He made 396 appearances in the Football League for Swindon Town, Plymouth Argyle, Crystal Palace and Torquay United, before moving into non-league football with Cambridge City. Jackson also appeared for England Schoolboys whilst at Swindon Town.

== Career ==
Jackson was born in Swindon, Wiltshire, began his youth career at Swindon Town and went on to a senior career at the club at a time when Bert Head was manager. After 91 League appearances and 30 goals he moved on to Plymouth Argyle in 1963, where he made 72 appearances, scoring 19 times. In September 1966, he signed for Crystal Palace then managed by Head. He made 24 appearances scoring 3 times in season 1966–67 and 27 appearances scoring 4 times in 1967–68. In season 1968–69 Palace reached the top flight for the first time and Jackson made 34 appearances, scored 14 times and finished as top scorer. In Palace's first season in the top tier Jackson made 21 appearances scoring 5 goals. In August 1970, he moved on to Torquay United where he made 127 appearances over the subsequent 4 seasons scoring 13 goals, before moving to non-league football with Cambridge City.

== Personal life ==
Jackson died on 22 May 2018, aged 76.
