= Terry Lewis (footballer) =

Australian rules footballer

Personal information
- Full name: Terry Lewis
- Born: 22 October 1937
- Died: 21 July 1975 (aged 37)
- Original team: South Melbourne Districts
- Height: 168 cm (5 ft 6 in)
- Weight: 67 kg (148 lb)

Playing career^{1}
Years	Club	Games (Goals)
1958	South Melbourne	3 (0)
- ^{1} Playing statistics correct to the end of 1958.

Terry Lewis (22 October 1937 – 21 July 1975) was an Australian rules footballer who played with South Melbourne in the Victorian Football League (VFL).
