= Malcolm Clarke (footballer) =

Scottish footballer

Personal information
- Full name: Malcolm McQueen Gillespie Clarke
- Date of birth: 29 June 1944
- Place of birth: Clydebank, Scotland
- Date of death: January 2004 (aged 59)
- Place of death: Leicester, England
- Position: Midfielder

Senior career*
Years	Team	Apps	(Gls)
- Johnstone Burgh
1965–1967	Leicester City	1	(0)
1967–1969	Cardiff City	45	(5)
1969–1970	Bristol City	3	(0)
1970–1971	Hartlepool United	33	(0)
1974	APIA Leichhardt	12	(0)
1975	Inter Monaro		
Total		94	(5)
- * Club domestic league appearances and goals

Malcolm McQueen Gillespie Clarke (29 June 1944 – January 2004) was a Scottish professional footballer who played as a midfielder in the English Football League.

== Career ==
After playing junior football in his native Scotland for Johnstone Burgh, Clarke played in the English Football League for Leicester City, Cardiff City, Bristol City and Hartlepool United. He later played in Australia for APIA Leichhardt and Inter Monaro.
