= Norman Dean =

English footballer

Personal information
- Full name: Norman Dean
- Date of birth: 13 September 1944 (age 82)
- Place of birth: Corby, England
- Position: Forward

Youth career
- Corby Town
- 1961–1963: Southampton

Senior career*
Years	Team	Apps	(Gls)
1963–1967	Southampton	18	(11)
1967–1968	Cardiff City	21	(3)
1968–1973	Barnsley	60	(19)
1973–1974	Bedford Town		
- * Club domestic league appearances and goals

Norman Dean (born 13 September 1944) is an English former professional footballer, who started his professional career at Southampton, before spells at Cardiff City and Barnsley.

== Playing career ==
=== Southampton ===
Norman Dean first joined Southampton in September 1961 as an amateur with the club's nursery side, CPC Sports, while undertaking a welding apprenticeship. He spent a long time in the club's reserve team, scoring 66 goals in 105 appearances for the reserves. He made his first appearance in the first team in a League Cup tie at Tranmere Rovers on 13 September 1963, but had to wait until September 1965 for his first league appearance.

He was a valuable member of the team, alongside Terry Paine, John Sydenham and Martin Chivers that gained Southampton promotion from League Division 2 in 1965–66, scoring 11 goals in 18 appearances, including a hat-trick against local rivals, Portsmouth on 5 February 1966. After Saints reached Division 1, he was replaced by Ron Davies.

=== Cardiff City ===
In March 1967, he was signed by Jimmy Scoular for Cardiff City for a fee of £6000. In the rest of the 1966-67 season he was virtually an ever-present, making 10 league appearances, scoring 2 goals. He also helped Cardiff to the Welsh Cup in 1967 and again the following season.

The following season, Dean struggled to establish himself in the first-team but, with Bobby Brown injured and Brian Clark ineligible, Dean featured in the 1967–68 Cup Winners' Cup, scoring 3 goals including the winner in the quarter-final play-off against Moscow Torpedo and 2 goals in the semi-final against Hamburg, which Cardiff lost 4–3 on aggregate.

=== Barnsley ===
In September 1968, he moved on to Barnsley where he stayed for 4 years, before a broken leg hastened his retirement.

== After football ==
After retiring from playing, he returned to Corby where he worked for British Steel Corporation. He later worked for the Oxford University Press.

He is back in Hampshire, working for Southampton F.C. as a security official at the club's Staplewood training ground.

He has 2 children. He is retired and continues to take an interest in football. He now lives up south close to Leicestershire.
