= Terry Wharton =

English footballer (1942–2026)

Personal information
- Date of birth: 1 July 1942
- Place of birth: Bolton, England
- Date of death: 3 January 2026 (aged 83)
- Position: Winger

Youth career
- 1957–1959: Wolverhampton Wanderers

Senior career*
Years	Team	Apps	(Gls)
1959–1968	Wolverhampton Wanderers	224	(69)
1967	Los Angeles Wolves	10	(3)
1968–1970	Bolton Wanderers	102	(28)
1970–1972	Crystal Palace	20	(1)
1972–1973	Durban City	7	(4)
1973–1974	Walsall	1	(0)
1974	Kidderminster Harriers	3	(2)
Total		367	(107)
- * Club domestic league appearances and goals

Terence J. Wharton (1 July 1942 – 3 January 2026) was an English professional footballer who scored 98 goals in 347 appearances in the English Football League. He played as a winger for Wolverhampton Wanderers, Bolton Wanderers, Crystal Palace, Walsall and Kidderminster Harriers in a 17-year senior career spanning from 1957 to 1974.

Outside of England he played for the Los Angeles Wolves, effectively Wolverhampton Wanderers under another name, in the United Soccer Association and for Durban City in South Africa.

== Career ==
Wharton was born in Bolton on 1 July 1942. He followed his father Jacky Wharton in becoming a winger in the Football League. His father had played in more than 250 league games for Plymouth Argyle, Preston North End, Manchester City, Blackburn Rovers and Newport County.

Wharton joined Wolves on his 15th birthday in 1957 and he turned professional at Molineux in October 1959, two years later scoring on his debut in a 2–0 home win over Ipswich Town on 11 November 1961, having replaced Mark Lazarus. He then went on to score two more goals when making his debut in the FA Cup, versus Carlisle United in January 1962.

He was Wolves' first-choice right winger for the next five-and-a-half seasons. He netted his first hat-trick for the club in March 1963 as fierce rivals West Bromwich Albion were beaten 7–0. He was in the Wolves side that lost their First Division status in 1964–65 through to the time the team returned to the First Division two seasons later. In the summer of 1967 Wharton was part of the Wolves team who toured the US playing as the Los Angeles Wolves in the experimental United Soccer Association.

Wharton had scored 83 goals in 242 games for Wolves when he joined his hometown club, Bolton Wanderers, for £70,000, the Lancashire club's record buy at the time. Wharton replaced Francis Lee, who had just been sold to Manchester City, and became Bolton's penalty-taker. Early the following season, he hit his first hat-trick for the club in a 4–2 win over Luton Town.

In January 1971, Wharton left Bolton and joined Crystal Palace where he made 20 league appearances, scoring once. He left Palace in December 1971 and played in South Africa for Durban City, scoring the opening goal in the South African Cup Final in 1972. In November 1973, he returned to England and joined Walsall; a sole outing as a substitute versus Leyton Orient proved to be his only appearance for the club.

Wharton wound down his career in 1974, appearing in three matches for non-league side Kidderminster Harriers during which he scored twice before retiring later that year.

After his retirement as a player, Wharton established a fledgling career as a manager, managing Stourbridge, Brewood and Wednesfield in the lower divisions of English football.

== Style of play ==
Renowned for his penalty-taking, Wharton converted 43 penalty kicks out of the 44 that he took during his career. This would rank him among the top three most successful penalty takers in Football League history alongside Graham Alexander (49 out of 51) and Matthew Le Tissier (47 out of 48).

== Death ==
Wharton died on 3 January 2026, aged 83.
