= Peter King (footballer, born 1943) =

English footballer

Personal information
- Full name: Peter Charles King
- Date of birth: 3 April 1943 (age 83)
- Place of birth: Worcester, England
- Positions: Winger; striker

Senior career*
Years	Team	Apps	(Gls)
- Worcester City
1960–1974	Cardiff City	356	(67)
- * Club domestic league appearances and goals

Peter Charles King (born 3 April 1943) is an English former professional footballer. He played his entire professional career at Cardiff City, making over 400 appearances in a fourteen-year spell between 1960 and 1974 putting him in the top five players with most appearances for the club.

== Career ==
Born in Worcester, King began his career at his hometown team Worcester City before being spotted by Cardiff City and signing for the club in 1960. He made his league debut in October 1961 against Burnley as a right winger. During the early part of his career, King suffered from a chest illness that nearly forced him out of football before he managed to overcome it during the 1963–64 season. He scored his only career league hattrick the following season during a 6–1 defeat of Middlesbrough and became the first player to score for the club in European competition when he found the net during the home leg of a tie against Danish side Esbjerg fB in the European Cup Winners' Cup.

He was a vital member of the side for the following few seasons, including finishing as top scorer during the 1967–68 season with eighteen goals in all competitions as they reached the semi-final of the European Cup Winners' Cup before suffering defeat to Hamburg. After spending thirteen seasons at Cardiff he was forced to quit the game at the age of thirty-one after suffering an Achilles tendon injury.

== Honours ==
Cardiff City

- Welsh Cup Winner: 7

1963–64, 1964–65, 1966–67, 1967–68, 1968–69, 1969–70, 1970–71

- Welsh Cup Finalist: 1

1971–72
