= Sandy Allan =

Scottish footballer (born 1947)

Personal information
- Full name: Alexander Begg Allan
- Date of birth: 29 October 1947 (age 79)
- Place of birth: Forfar, Scotland
- Position: Forward

Senior career*
Years	Team	Apps	(Gls)
- Rhyl
1967–1970	Cardiff City	9	(1)
1970–1974	Bristol Rovers	57	(18)
1973	→ Swansea City (loan)	7	(1)
- Cape Town City

Managerial career
- Harrogate Railway Athletic
- * Club domestic league appearances and goals

Alexander Begg Allan (born 29 October 1947) is a Scottish former professional footballer. During his career, he made over 50 appearances in the Football League.

After attracting attention as an amateur player, he signed for Cardiff City in 1967 and made his professional debut soon after. However, a broken ankle and strong competition for places limited him to nine league appearances over three seasons. During his time with Cardiff, he became the first player to score a headed hat-trick in a European competition during a match against Mjøndalen IF in 1969.

He moved to Bristol Rovers in 1970 for £12,500, scoring 18 league goals in 57 appearances. After a brief loan spell with Swansea City in 1973, he moved to South Africa.

== Early life ==
Born in Forfar, Allan grew up in the village of Killiecrankie. At the age of fifteen, he began working in a mine alongside his father in the nearby town of Tullibody. However, after three months, the family relocated to Yorkshire.

== Career ==
=== Early career ===
Allan began his football career as an amateur, featuring for Barnsley and Doncaster Rovers. He was offered a part-time contract with Welsh side Rhyl, managed by Albert Dunlop, who were playing in the Cheshire League. He developed a reputation as a prolific goalscorer for Rhyl, earning himself the nickname "The Boy with the Golden Boots". His form attracted attention from several clubs and Dunlop personally travelled with Allan in an attempt to secure a transfer. The pair later met Tony Kay, who warned Allan that Dunlop was using the transfer as a way of making money for himself. Allan instead returned to Rhyl where the chairman confirmed the suspicions and instead contacted Cardiff City.

=== Cardiff City ===
After impressing manager Jimmy Scoular, Allan joined Cardiff in 1967 for a fee of £12,500. He made his professional debut for the club on 19 August 1967, the opening day of the 1967–68 season, in a 1–1 draw with Plymouth Argyle. In his second appearance a month later, Allan suffered a broken ankle. After an extended period out, he made his return to the first team over a year later, scoring his first senior professional goal during a 2–0 victory over Bury. Despite scoring eight times in eleven matches during a tour of Mauritius and Zambia on his return, Allan found first team opportunities limited due to the presence of several senior forwards at the club, including John Toshack, Brian Clark and Bobby Brown. Allan later stated that he was largely overlooked as "Jimmy Scoular, thought the club could sell John Toshack and kept playing him."

Although he continued to struggle for league appearances during the 1969–70 season, Allan did feature for the club in the UEFA Cup Winners' Cup. On 1 October 1969, he became the first player to score a headed hat-trick in a European club competition when he achieved the feat during a 5–1 victory over Norwegian side Mjøndalen IF during the second leg of their first round tie. All three of the goals were scored during a seven-minute spell of the first half, later described as "a header at the near post, one at the far post and a diving header in the middle."

=== Later career ===
In March 1970, he left Cardiff to sign for Bristol Rovers, again for a fee of £12,500. In March 1973, he was allowed to join Swansea City on loan, being signed by manager Harry Gregg. He scored one goal in seven league appearances before returning to Bristol. He left Bristol in March 1974, moving to South Africa where he played for Cape Town City. He later had a spell as player-manager of non-league side Harrogate Railway Athletic.
