= Ronnie Bird (footballer) =

English footballer (1941–2005)

Personal information
- Full name: Ronald Philip Bird
- Date of birth: 27 December 1941
- Place of birth: Birmingham, England
- Date of death: 20 March 2005 (aged 63)
- Place of death: Cardiff, Wales
- Position: Winger

Youth career
- Birmingham City

Senior career*
Years	Team	Apps	(Gls)
1959–1961	Birmingham City	0	(0)
1961–1965	Bradford Park Avenue	129	(39)
1965–1966	Bury	13	(3)
1966–1971	Cardiff City	107	(24)
1971–1972	Crewe Alexandra	20	(0)
1972–1974	Gloucester City		(19)
- * Club domestic league appearances and goals

Ronald Philip Bird (27 December 1941 – 20 March 2005) was an English professional footballer who scored 66 goals from 269 appearances in the Football League in the 1960s and early 1970s. He played more than 100 league matches for each of Bradford Park Avenue and Cardiff City, and also had spells with Bury and Crewe Alexandra.

== Career ==
Born in Erdington, Birmingham, Bird played football at youth level for England alongside Bobby Moore. He began his club career as an apprentice at his hometown club Birmingham City, turning professional in January 1959 at the age of 18, but found first team chances hard to come by and left to join Bradford Park Avenue, being signed by manager Jimmy Scoular in June 1961. He quickly established himself in the side and helped the club to retain their Division Three status after being promoted the previous year. He became a prolific penalty scorer at the club and his 14 penalties scored in league football remains a club record.

He eventually left Bradford in 1965 to join Bury but only spent seven months at Gigg Lane before being signed again by Jimmy Scoular, this time at his new club Cardiff City for £5,000. He helped the club to win the Welsh Cup in his first season, one of three times he won the competition at Cardiff, and gained a reputation for scoring spectacular goals. He left Cardiff after five seasons at the club, after falling out with management over not being selected for the Cup Winners' Cup quarter-final match against Real Madrid, and joined Crewe Alexandra where he spent one year before dropping into non-league football with Gloucester City. He scored 21 times from 89 matches in all competitions during two seasons with the Tigers, and was appointed club captain for the 1973–74 season.

== Later life ==
After retiring from football he took over as manager at Ebbw Vale and Bridgend Town before later returning to work with Jimmy Scoular as his assistant manager at Newport County. He left his post at the club during the 1978–79 season and later took over as landlord of the Golden Cross and Romilly Arms pubs in Cardiff. His experience in the trade prompted Cardiff City to hire him to take charge of the several bars in the club's ground and he later took up a number of positions at the club including match day hospitality manager, manager of the players' restaurant and a commentator for the club's website. He was taken ill in 2003, originally thinking he was suffering from flu, and was diagnosed with leukaemia. He subsequently stepped down from his various roles at the club, although after recovering somewhat he later returned to commentate on matches again before he died in the University Hospital of Wales, Cardiff, in 2005.

== Honours ==
Cardiff City

- Welsh Cup winner: 1966–67, 1969–70, 1970–71
