= Fred Davies (footballer, born 1939) =

English footballer (1939–2020)

Personal information
- Full name: Frederick Davies
- Date of birth: 22 August 1939
- Place of birth: Liverpool, England
- Date of death: 2 September 2020 (aged 81)
- Position: Goalkeeper

Youth career
- Llandudno
- 1957–1961: Wolverhampton Wanderers

Senior career*
Years	Team	Apps	(Gls)
1961–1968	Wolverhampton Wanderers	156	(0)
1967	→ Los Angeles Wolves (guest)	5	(0)
1968–1970	Cardiff City	99	(0)
1970–1974	AFC Bournemouth	134	(0)

Managerial career
- 1993–1997: Shrewsbury Town
- 1997–1999: Weymouth
- * Club domestic league appearances and goals

Frederick Davies (22 August 1939 – 2 September 2020) was an English footballer who made nearly 400 appearances in the Football League playing as a goalkeeper for Wolverhampton Wanderers, Cardiff City and AFC Bournemouth. He later became a manager, taking charge of Shrewsbury Town and Weymouth.

== Playing career ==
Born in Liverpool, Davies began his football career when he joined Wolverhampton Wanderers in 1957 at the age of 17. His first season at the club was spent in the reserves and Davies became disillusioned with the coaching process at the club, claiming "I couldn't see myself learning anything because I had no one to learn from". However, Davies later met former Wolves goalkeeper Bert Williams in his shop and Williams offered to help train Davies in his spare time, the pair having training sessions at Wolves' Castlecroft training ground. He had to wait five years before making his debut on 27 January 1962 in an FA Cup tie against rivals West Brom. He managed 12 appearances during this season, and made the position his own in the 1962–63 campaign, replacing Malcolm Finlayson.

He faced competition throughout his time at Molineux, but was the club's main goalkeeper during the mid-1960s as they suffered relegation from the top flight, only to win promotion back in 1966–67. He also played for the Wolves team which, playing as the Los Angeles Wolves, won the 1967 United Soccer Association championship.

In 1968, the goalkeeper left Wolves for Second Division side Cardiff City for a fee of £10,000. He played over 100 games in total for the Bluebirds, winning the Welsh Cup on three occasions, before moving on to Bournemouth & Boscombe Athletic (soon to be renamed AFC Bournemouth) two years later. He won another promotion here as the club went up to the (old) Third Division in 1970–71.

== Coaching career ==
Upon retiring from playing, he joined his former Bournemouth manager John Bond as a coach at Norwich City during the 1970s. Bond had been instrumental in Davies' move into coaching having encouraged him to get his coaching badges during a lengthy injury spell during their time at Bournemouth together. He was a coach under Alan Ball at Blackpool in the 1980–81 season. He later had two spells on the coaching staff at Swansea City during the 1980s. He joined up again with John Bond in the early 1990s at Shrewsbury Town and stepped in as caretaker manager after Bond's resignation in May 1993.

His first season as manager of Shrewsbury was a success as he guided the club to the Division Three championship, and he was officially appointed on a full-time basis in January 1994. He took the club to Wembley for the first time in their history in April 1996 when they reached the final of the Football League Trophy, only to lose 2–1 to Rotherham United. Davies steered the club clear of the drop in the third tier for two seasons before relegation struck in 1996–97, which cost him his job at the end of a season where the club had looked set for mid-table security for most of the campaign before a late slump in form. He made a quick return to management with non-league Weymouth, managing the Dorset club for two seasons, winning promotion to the Southern Premier League in his first season there.

== Death ==
Davies, who latterly lived at Telford, Shropshire, died on 2 September 2020 aged 81, eighteen months after being diagnosed with pulmonary fibrosis.

== Honours ==
=== Player ===
Cardiff City

- Welsh Cup: 1967–68, 1968–69, 1969–70

=== Manager ===
Shrewsbury Town

- Football League Third Division: 1993–94
