= Barrie Jones (footballer) =

Welsh footballer (born 1941)

Personal information
- Full name: Barrie Spencer Jones
- Date of birth: 10 October 1941 (age 85)
- Place of birth: Swansea, Wales
- Position: Winger

Senior career*
Years	Team	Apps	(Gls)
1959–1964	Swansea Town	166	(23)
1964–1967	Plymouth Argyle	98	(9)
1967–1970	Cardiff City	107	(18)
1971–1972	Yeovil Town	?	(?)
1972–1973	Worcester City	?	(?)
1973–1974	Merthyr Tydfil	?	(?)

International career
1960–?	Wales U23	8	(?)
1962–1969	Wales	15	(2)
- * Club domestic league appearances and goals

Barrie Spencer Jones (born 10 October 1941) is a Welsh former professional footballer. During his career, he made over 350 appearances in The Football League with Swansea Town, Plymouth Argyle and Cardiff City and represented Wales at both under-23 and senior level.

== Club career ==
Born in Swansea, Jones began his career at his home town team Swansea Town, signing professional with the club in September 1959. A skilful winger, he soon established himself in the squad, winning the Welsh Cup in 1961, and was transferred to Plymouth Argyle in 1964 for £45,000; which was a club record fee for Plymouth and a British record fee for a winger at the time. He spent three years at the club, reaching the Football League Cup semi-finals during the 1964–65 season, before returning to South Wales in March 1967, joining Cardiff City for £25,000.

After joining Cardiff, he switched to a more central midfield role and was ever present during the 1967–68 and 1968–69 seasons and was part of the side that reached the semi-finals of the European Cup Winners' Cup and won three Welsh Cups between 1967 and 1969. From his debut, Jones played in 107 consecutive league games for the club, at the time second only to Arthur Lever's tally of 114 consecutive appearances between 1946 and 1949, before his run was ended on 4 October 1969, when he suffered a broken leg during a 3–2 defeat to Blackpool. He attempted several comebacks at reserve level but never fully managed to regain full fitness and instead moved into non-league football with spells at Yeovil Town, Worcester City and Merthyr Tydfil.

== International career ==
Jones won eight caps for Wales at under-23 level before making his senior debut on 20 October 1962 in a 3–2 defeat against Scotland at Ninian Park in the 1963 British Home Championship. He went on to make a total of fifteen appearances, scoring two goals, winning his final cap on 28 July 1969.

=== International goals ===
Results list Wales' goal tally first.

Goal	Date	Venue	Opponent	Result	Competition
1.	20 November 1963	Hampden Park, Glasgow, Scotland	Scotland	1–2	1964 British Home Championship
2.	26 March 1969	Waldstadion (Frankfurt), Germany	Germany	1–1	Friendly

== Honours ==
- Swansea City: Welsh Cup winner: 1961
- Cardiff City: Welsh Cup winner: 1967, 1968, 1969
