= George McVitie =

English footballer

Personal information
- Full name: George James McVitie
- Date of birth: 7 September 1948 (age 78)
- Place of birth: Carlisle, England
- Position: Right winger

Senior career*
Years	Team	Apps	(Gls)
1965–1970	Carlisle United	128	(21)
1970–1972	West Bromwich Albion	42	(5)
1972–1976	Oldham Athletic	113	(19)
1976–1981	Carlisle United	198	(20)
1981–1982	Queen of the South	21	(1)
Total		502	(66)
- * Club domestic league appearances and goals

George James McVitie (born 7 September 1948) is an English footballer who played as a right winger in the Football League.

== Career ==
McVitie's club of longest service was Carlisle United for whom he played in two spells. These were sandwiched around playing for West Bromwich Albion and Oldham Athletic. He ended his senior career playing in Scotland for Dumfries club, Queen of the South.
