= Tim Ward (footballer) =

English footballer and manager

Personal information
- Full name: Timothy Victor Ward
- Date of birth: 16 September 1917
- Place of birth: Cheltenham, England
- Date of death: 28 January 1993 (aged 75)
- Place of death: England
- Height: 1.78 m (5 ft 10 in)
- Position: Right winger

Youth career
- Cheltenham Schools
- Charlton Kings

Senior career*
Years	Team	Apps	(Gls)
1935–1937	Cheltenham Town		
1937–1951	Derby County	238	(4)
1951–1953	Barnsley	33	(0)

International career
1947–1948	England	2	(0)

Managerial career
- 1953: Exeter City
- 1953–1960: Barnsley
- 1960–1962: Grimsby Town
- 1962–1967: Derby County
- 1967–1968: Carlisle United
- * Club domestic league appearances and goals

Victor Timothy Ward (17 September 1917 – 28 January 1993) was an English footballer and subsequently football manager, most notable for his time with Derby County.

== Biography ==
Ward was the adopted son of Bill and Eunice Andrews and raised in Charlton Kings near Cheltenham. Tim played football on the local pitches with his childhood friend Cedric, during these games Cedric would be Arsenal and Tim would be Derby County.

He attended Charlton Kings Boys School.

== Playing career ==
Ward began his schoolboy career playing for Charlton Kings School, afterwards playing for Andoversford in the Cheltenham League. He then joined local team Cheltenham Town who were then embarking on their first seasons in the Southern Football league. In 1937 Ward had an unsuccessful trial for Leicester City risking the sack from his job, before catching the attention of Derby County scout Jackie Whitehouse. He joined the club on trial, scoring with the first kick of his first trial match with Derby County 'A', and convinced George Jobey to pay Cheltenham £100 and became a full-time professional, playing at left half, replacing England international defender Errington Keen. Like many of his generation, Ward's career was adversely affected by the outbreak of World War II, and during his time in the army Ward made guest appearances for Notts County, Hamilton Academical and Leeds United and also played for the Scottish Army XI before he was sent to fight in Europe. After the war Ward played for the BAOR team before being demobbed. His time in Germany saw him miss all but one game of Derby's 1946 FA Cup campaign. Ward was philosophical on missing the final, saying 'So many of my friends were killed in the war and I regarded myself lucky to emerge from it, rather than unlucky to miss Wembley." On his return to England, despite Arsenal offering £10,000 for his services, Derby found him a position at right-half, where he was successful enough to gain 2 full England caps, making his debut against Belgium on 21 September 1947 at The Heysel Stadium and also appearing against Wales at Villa Park on 10 November 1948. He was also part of the FA Tour of Canada in 1950. He was sold to Barnsley in 1951, spending two years with the Tykes before entering management.

== Managerial career ==
"The job has been the toughest I have ever had, and the shortage of money has been frustrating. The trouble with this club is that you can't put a threepenny stamp on a letter without consulting the board personally. I was told that money was available but I could never get an answer when I asked how much"

— Tim Ward on his time as Derby manager

Ward's management career started with an 8-day stay as Exeter City manager. After being appointed manager on 4 March 1953, and despite travelling to their Third Division South match against Ipswich Town, Barnsley, who had never released Ward, recalled him on 12 March and appointed him manager two weeks later. Though he arrived too late to save Barnsley from relegation, he achieved promotion straight away as Third Division North Champions in 1955. Though Barnsley were relegated again four years later, he was still comfortably established at Oakwell until joining Grimsby in January 1960. Another promotion followed as Grimsby finished runners up in the 1961–62 Third Division, finishing just three points behind winners Portsmouth.

His success at Grimsby saw him coveted by Derby County, who appointed him manager ahead of the 1962–63 season. At the time Derby were established as a Second division side and, after four years of finishing progressively higher in the league (18th, 13th, 9th, 8th), the club dipped to 17th in the 1966/67 season and the club decided not to renew his contract, replacing him with Brian Clough. Ward's five years at Derby were blighted by a lack of cash and a parochial attitude in the boardroom, but he is often credited with laying the foundations for the success of his successor, such as signing Colin Boulton, Peter Daniel, Kevin Hector, Alan Durban and Ron Webster, all of whom were part of Clough's 1972 Football League winning side. Ward claimed that the successful signing of Eddie Thomas for just £3,500, counted against him, saying "(Thomas) proved a marvellous bargain and after that I was expected to sign other players as cheaply." After Derby, Ward spent 15 months as manager of Carlisle United before leaving football management completely.

== Post Management ==
Following his retirement from management, Ward ran the ex-Derby County football side and was instrumental in the formation of the Derby County Former Player's Association in 1991, becoming the first chairman. He also held a position of scout for Nottingham Forest.

== Honours ==
=== As a manager ===
Barnsley

- Third Division North champions: 1954–55

Grimsby Town

- Third Division runners-up: 1961–62

== Personal life ==
Tim married Harriet Anne Elliott (born 1 May 1919) in Derby in 1940. She died in 1996;
