= England national football team results (1960–1979) =

- Win Draw Loss

This is a list of the England national football team results from 1960 to 1979 (matches 338–536).

== 1960s ==
=== 1960 ===
19 April Home Championship	Scotland	1–1	England	Glasgow, Scotland
Match 338	Leggat 16'	Report	Charlton 49' (pen.)	Stadium: Hampden Park; Attendance: 129,783; Referee: Jeno Szranko (Hungary)

11 May International friendly	England	3–3	Yugoslavia	London, England
Match 339	Douglas 43'; Greaves 48'; Haynes 89'	Report	Galić 31', 60'; Kostić 80'	Stadium: Wembley; Attendance: 60,000; Referee: Robert Holley Davidson (Scotland)

15 May International friendly	Spain	3–0	England	Madrid, Spain
Match 340	Martínez; Peiró	Report		Stadium: Santiago Bernabéu; Attendance: 77,000; Referee: Albert Dusch (West Germany)

22 May International friendly	Hungary	2–0	England	Budapest, Hungary
Match 341	Albert	Report		Stadium: Népstadion; Attendance: 90,000; Referee: Concetto Lo Bello (Italy)

8 October Home Championship	Northern Ireland	2–5	England	Belfast, Northern Ireland
Match 342	McAdams 38', 57'	Report	Smith 16'; Greaves 41', 47', 88'; Douglas 80'	Stadium: Windsor Park; Attendance: 60,000; Referee: David Phillips (Scotland)

19 October 1962 FIFA World Cup; Qualification Group 6	Luxembourg	0–9	England	Luxembourg City, Luxembourg
Match 343		Report	Charlton 3', 7', 66'; Greaves 16', 83', 85'; Smith 22', 46'; Haynes 61'	Stadium: Stade Municipal; Attendance: 5,500; Referee: Johannes Martens (Netherlands)

26 October International friendly	England	4–2	Spain	London, England
Match 344	Greaves 2'; Douglas 48'; Smith 68', 80'	Report	del Sol 13'; Suárez 56'	Stadium: Wembley; Attendance: 85,000; Referee: Maurice Guigue (France)

23 November Home Championship	England	5–1	Wales	London, England
Match 345	Greaves 2', 70'; Charlton 16'; Smith 22'; Haynes 61'	Report	Leek	Stadium: Wembley; Attendance: 65,000; Referee: Robert Holley Davidson (Scotland)

=== 1961 ===
15 April Home Championship	England	9–3	Scotland	London, England
Match 346	Robson 9'; Greaves 21', 30', 83'; Douglas 55'; Smith 73', 85'; Haynes 78', 82'	Report	Mackay 48'; Wilson 53'; Quinn 75'	Stadium: Wembley; Attendance: 97,350; Referee: Marcel Lequesne (France)

10 May International friendly	England	8–0	Mexico	London, England
Match 347	Hitchens 2'; Charlton 12', 62', 73'; Robson 23'; Douglas 44', 85'; Flowers 59' (pen.)	Report		Stadium: Wembley; Attendance: 77,000; Referee: Robert Holley Davidson (Scotland)

21 May 1962 FIFA World Cup; Qualification Group 6	Portugal	1–1	England	Oeiras, Portugal
Match 348	Águas 59'	Report	Flowers 82'	Stadium: Estádio Nacional; Attendance: 65,000; Referee: Pietro Bonnetto (Italy)

24 May International friendly	Italy	2–3	England	Rome, Italy
Match 349	Sívori 43'; Brighenti 74'	Report	Hitchens 39', 77'; Greaves 86'	Stadium: Stadio Olimpico; Attendance: 90,000; Referee: Nikolay Latyshev (Soviet Union)

27 May International friendly	Austria	3–1	England	Vienna, Austria
Match 350	Hof 3'; Nemec 25'; Senekowitsch 80'	Report	Greaves 16'	Stadium: Praterstadion; Attendance: 90,726; Referee: Karol Galba (Czechoslovakia)

28 September 1962 FIFA World Cup; Qualification Group 6	England	4–1	Luxembourg	London, England
Match 351	Pointer 35'; Viollet 37'; Charlton 45', 76'	Report	Dimmer 69'	Stadium: Arsenal Stadium; Attendance: 33,409; Referee: Gérard Versyp (Belgium)

14 October Home Championship	Wales	1–1	England	Cardiff, Wales
Match 352	G. Williams 30'	Report	Douglas 44'	Stadium: Ninian Park; Attendance: 61,566; Referee: Dave Phillips (Scotland)

25 October 1962 FIFA World Cup; Qualification Group 6	England	2–0	Portugal	London, England
Match 353	Connelly 5'; Pointer 9'	Report		Stadium: Wembley; Referee: Marcel Bois (France)

22 November Home Championship	England	1–1	Northern Ireland	London, England
Match 354	Charlton 20'	Report	McIlroy 81'	Stadium: Wembley; Attendance: 30,000; Referee: Leo Callaghan (Wales)

=== 1962 ===
4 April International friendly	England	3–1	Austria	London, England
Match 355	Crawford 7'; Flowers 38'; Hunt 68'	Report	Buzek 76'	Stadium: Wembley; Attendance: 50,000; Referee: Pierre Schwinte (France)

14 April Home Championship	Scotland	2–0	England	Glasgow, Scotland
Match 356	Wilson 13'; Caldow 88' (pen.)	Report		Stadium: Hampden Park; Attendance: 132,441; Referee: Leo Horn (Netherlands)

9 May International friendly	England	3–1	Switzerland	London, England
Match 357	Flowers 20'; Hitchens 21'; Connelly 36'	Report	Allemann 32'	Stadium: Wembley; Attendance: 30,000; Referee: Daniel Zariquiegui Izco (Spain)

20 May International friendly	Peru	0–4	England	Lima, Peru
Match 358		Report	Flowers 15' (pen.); Greaves 24', 37', 38'	Stadium: Estadio Nacional; Attendance: 32,565; Referee: Erwin Hieger (Austria)

31 May 1962 FIFA World Cup; Group 4	Hungary	2–1	England	Rancagua, Chile
15:00 CLT (UTC−04); Match 359	Tichy 17'; Albert 61'	FIFA Report	Flowers 60' (pen.)	Stadium: Estadio Braden; Attendance: 7,938; Referee: Leo Horn (Netherlands)

2 June 1962 FIFA World Cup; Group 4	England	3–1	Argentina	Rancagua, Chile
15:00 CLT (UTC−04); Match 360	Flowers 17' (pen.); Charlton 42'; Greaves 67'	FIFA Report	Sanfilippo 67'	Stadium: Estadio Braden; Attendance: 9,794; Referee: Nikolay Latyshev (Soviet Union)

7 June 1962 FIFA World Cup; Group 4	England	0–0	Bulgaria	Rancagua, Chile
15:00 CLT (UTC−04); Match 361		Report		Stadium: Estadio Braden; Attendance: 5,700; Referee: Antoine Blavier (Belgium)

10 June 1962 FIFA World Cup; Quarter-finals	Brazil	3–1	England	Viña del Mar, Chile
14:30 CLT (UTC−04); Match 362	Garrincha 31', 59'; Vavá 53'	Report	Hitchens 38'	Stadium: Estadio Sausalito; Attendance: 17,736; Referee: Pierre Schwinte (France)

3 October 1964 UEFA ENC; Preliminary Round	England	1–1	France	Sheffield, England
Match 363 First leg	Flowers 57' (pen.)	UEFA Report	Goujon 8'	Stadium: Hillsborough; Attendance: 35,380; Referee: Frede Hansen (Denmark)

20 October Home Championship	Northern Ireland	1–3	England	Belfast, Northern Ireland
Match 364	Barr 62'	Report	Greaves 38'; O'Grady 71', 73'	Stadium: Windsor Park; Attendance: 55,000; Referee: James Barclay (Scotland)

21 November Home Championship	England	4–0	Wales	London, England
Match 365	Connelly 7'; Peacock 35', 63'; Greaves 88'	Report		Stadium: Wembley; Attendance: 27,500; Referee: S Carswell (Republic of Ireland)

=== 1963 ===
27 February 1964 UEFA ENC; Preliminary Round	France	5–2 (6–3 agg.)	England	Paris, France
Match 366 Second leg	Wisnieski 3', 75'; Douis 32'; Cossou 43', 82'	UEFA Report	Smith 57'; Tambling 74'	Stadium: Parc des Princes; Attendance: 23,986; Referee: Josef Kandlbinder (West Germany)

6 April Home Championship	England	1–2	Scotland	London, England
Match 367	Douglas 80'	Report	Baxter 29', 32' (pen.)	Stadium: Wembley; Attendance: 98,606; Referee: Leo Horn (Netherlands)

8 May International friendly	England	1–1	Brazil	London, England
Match 368	Douglas 86'	Report	Pepe 18'	Stadium: Wembley; Attendance: 92,000; Referee: Leo Horn (Netherlands)

29 May International friendly	Czechoslovakia	2–4	England	Bratislava, Czechoslovakia
Match 369	Scherer 52'; Kadraba 72'	Report	Greaves 18', 81'; Smith 45'; Charlton 71'	Stadium: Tehelné pole Attendance: 50,000; Referee: Bertil Lööw (Sweden)

2 June International friendly	East Germany	1–2	England	Leipzig, East Germany
Match 370	P. Ducke 24'	Report	Hunt 45'; Charlton 70'	Stadium: Zentralstadion; Attendance: 90,000; Referee: Zečević (Yugoslavia)

5 June International friendly	Switzerland	1–8	England	Basel, Switzerland
Match 371	Heinz Bertschi 44'	Report	Charlton 18', 55', 83'; Byrne 30', 50'; Douglas 42'; Melia 75'; Kay 69'	Stadium: St Jakob Park; Attendance: 49,800; Referee: István Zsolt (Hungary)

12 October Home Championship	Wales	0–4	England	Cardiff, Wales
Match 372		Report	Smith 5', 69'; Greaves 68'; Charlton 86'	Stadium: Ninian Park; Attendance: 48,350; Referee: Willie Brittle (Scotland)

23 October International friendly	England	2–1	Rest of World (Note: As it did not take place against a standard national opponent, FIFA no longer considers this match to be valid as a full international; however, the FA still does so.)	London, England
14:45; Match 373	Paine 65'; Greaves 90'	Report	Law 82'	Stadium: Wembley; Attendance: 48,350; Referee: Bobby Davidson (Scotland)

20 November Home Championship	England	8–3	Northern Ireland	London, England
Match 374	Paine 2', 38', 61'; Greaves 20', 30', 60', 65'; Smith 46'	Report	Crossan 42'; Wilson 53', 85'	Stadium: Wembley; Attendance: 53,000; Referee: Leo Callaghan (Wales)

=== 1964 ===
11 April Home Championship	Scotland	1–0	England	Glasgow, Scotland
	Gilzean 72'	Report		Stadium: Hampden Park; Attendance: 133,245; Referee: Leo Horn (Netherlands)

6 May International friendly	England	2–1	Uruguay	London, England
	Byrne 43', 52'	Report	Spencer 78'	Stadium: Wembley Stadium; Attendance: 54,000; Referee: István Zsolt (Hungary)

17 May International friendly	Portugal	3–4	England	Lisbon, Portugal
	Torres 18', 47'; Eusébio 53'	Report	Byrne 21', 57', 88'; Charlton 29'	Stadium: Estádio Nacional; Attendance: 46,000; Referee: Juan Gardeazábal Garay (Spain

24 May International friendly	Republic of Ireland	1–3	England	Dublin, Republic of Ireland
	Strahan 41'	Report	Eastham 9'; Byrne 22'; Greaves 55'	Stadium: Dalymount Park; Attendance: 45,000; Referee: Bobby Davidson (Scotland)

27 May International friendly	United States	0–10	England	New York, USA
		Report	Hunt 4', 22', 53', 64'; Pickering 6', 47', 74'; Paine 49', 68'; Charlton 67'	Stadium: Downing Stadium; Attendance: 5,062; Referee: Ray Morgan (Canada)

30 May Nations' Cup	Brazil	5–1	England	Rio de Janeiro, Brazil
	Rinaldo 35', 59'; Pelé 63'; Julinho 68'; Roberto Dias 88'	Report	Greaves 48'	Stadium: Maracanã; Attendance: 110,000; Referee: Pierre Schwinte (France)

4 June Nations' Cup	Portugal	1–1	England	São Paulo, Brazil
	Peres 42'	Report	Hunt 58'	Stadium: Estádio do Pacaembu; Attendance: 70,000; Referee: Armando Marques (Brazil)

6 June Nations' Cup	Argentina	1–0	England	Rio de Janeiro, Brazil
	Rojas 66'	Report		Stadium: Maracanã; Attendance: 95,000; Referee: Leo Horn (Netherlands)

3 October Home Championship	Northern Ireland	3–4	England	Belfast, Northern Ireland
	Wilson 52'; McLaughlin 55', 67'	Report	Pickering 7'; Greaves 12', 16', 24'	Stadium: Windsor Park; Attendance: 58,000; Referee: Willie Brittle (Scotland)

21 October International friendly	England	2–2	Belgium	London, England
	Pickering 32'; Hinton 70'	Report	Cornelis 22'; Van Himst 42'	Stadium: Wembley Stadium; Attendance: 45,000; Referee: Concetto Lo Bello (Italy)

18 November Home Championship	England	2–1	Wales	London, England
	Wignall 17', 60'	Report	Jones 75'	Stadium: Wembley Stadium; Attendance: 40,000; Referee: Thomas Mitchell (Northern Ireland)

9 December International friendly	Netherlands	1–1	England	Amsterdam, Netherlands
	Moulijn 77'	Report	Greaves 85'	Stadium: Olympisch Stadion; Attendance: 57,500; Referee: Joseph Hannet (Belgium)

=== 1965 ===
10 April Home Championship	England	2–2	Scotland	London, England
15:00	R. Charlton 24'; Greaves 34'	Report	Law 40'; St. John 59'	Stadium: Wembley Stadium; Attendance: 98,199; Referee: István Zsolt (Hungary)

5 May International friendly	England	1–0	Hungary	London, England
	Greaves 17'	Report		Stadium: Wembley Stadium; Attendance: 52,000; Referee: Pierre Schwinte (France)

9 May International friendly	Yugoslavia	1–1	England	Belgrade, Yugoslavia
	Kovačević 15'	Report	Bridges 22'	Stadium: Red Star Stadium; Attendance: 60,000; Referee: Gyula Gere (Hungary)

12 May International friendly	West Germany	0–1	England	Nuremberg, West Germany
		Report	Paine 37'	Stadium: Frankenstadion; Attendance: 67,000; Referee: István Zsolt (Hungary)

16 May International friendly	Sweden	1–2	England	Gothenburg, Sweden
	Eriksson 25'	Report	Ball 9'; Connelly 72'	Stadium: Ullevi; Attendance: 18,000; Referee: Henri Faucheux (France)

2 October Home Championship	Wales	0–0	England	Cardiff, Wales
		Report		Stadium: Ninian Park; Attendance: 30,000; Referee: A. Webster (Scotland)

20 October International friendly	England	2–3	Austria	London, England
	R. Charlton 3'; Connelly 59'	Report	Flögel 53'; Fritsch 73', 81'	Stadium: Wembley Stadium; Attendance: 65,000; Referee: Pierre Schwinte (France)

10 November Home Championship	England	2–1	Northern Ireland	London, England
	Baker 19'; Peacock 73'	Report	Irvine 21'	Stadium: Wembley Stadium; Attendance: 71,000; Referee: Leo Callaghan (Wales)

8 December International friendly	Spain	0–2	England	Madrid, Spain
		Report	Baker 8'; Hunt 58'	Stadium: Santiago Bernabéu Stadium; Attendance: 25,000; Referee: Concetto Lo Bello (Italy)

=== 1966 ===
5 January International friendly	England	1–1	Poland	Liverpool, England
	Moore 74'	Report	Sadek 42'	Stadium: Goodison Park; Attendance: 47,750; Referee: Joseph Hannet (Belgium)

23 February International friendly	England	1–0	West Germany	London, England
	Stiles 41'	Report		Stadium: Wembley Stadium; Attendance: 75,000; Referee: Pieter Roomer (Netherlands)

2 April Home Championship	Scotland	3–4	England	Glasgow, Scotland
	Law 41'; J. Johnstone 62', 81'	Report	Hurst 18'; Hunt 34', 47'; R. Charlton 73'	Stadium: Hampden Park; Attendance: 133,000; Referee: Henri Faucheux (France)

4 May International friendly	England	2–0	Yugoslavia	London, England
	Greaves 9'; R. Charlton 34'	Report		Stadium: Wembley Stadium; Attendance: 54,000; Referee: Johannes Malka (East Germany)

26 June International friendly	Finland	0–3	England	Helsinki, Finland
		Report	Peters 42'; Hunt 44'; J. Charlton 89'	Stadium: Olympic Stadium; Attendance: 10,500; Referee: F. Hansen (Denmark)

29 June International friendly	Norway	1–6	England	Oslo, Norway
	Sunde 4'	Report	Greaves 20', 24', 44', 74'; Connelly 22'; Moore 40'	Stadium: Ullevaal Stadion; Attendance: 29,500; Referee: Hans Carlsson (Sweden)

3 July International friendly	Denmark	0–2	England	Copenhagen, Denmark
		Report	J. Charlton 44'; Eastham 61'	Stadium: Idrætsparken; Attendance: 32,000; Referee: Ray Morgan (Canada)

5 July International friendly	Poland	0–1	England	Chorzów, Poland
		Report	Hunt 14'	Stadium: Silesian Stadium; Attendance: 70,000; Referee: István Zsolt (Hungary)

11 July 1966 FIFA World Cup; Group 1	England	0–0	Uruguay	London, England
		Report		Stadium: Wembley Stadium; Attendance: 87,148; Referee: István Zsolt (Hungary)

16 July 1966 FIFA World Cup; Group 1	England	2–0	Mexico	London, England
	R. Charlton 38'; Hunt 74'	Report		Stadium: Wembley Stadium; Attendance: 92,570; Referee: Concetto lo Bello (Italy)

20 July 1966 FIFA World Cup; Group 1	England	2–0	France	London, England
	Hunt 38', 75'; Stiles (yellow card)	Report		Stadium: Wembley Stadium; Attendance: 98,270; Referee: Arturo Yamasaki Maldonado (Peru)

23 July 1966 FIFA World Cup; Quarter-finals	England	1–0	Argentina	London, England
	Hurst 78'; J. Charlton (yellow card); R. Charlton (yellow card)	Report	Ferreiro (yellow card); Perfumo (yellow card); Rattín (yellow card) (yellow-red card) 35'; Artime (yellow card); Solari (yellow card)	Stadium: Wembley Stadium; Attendance: 90,584; Referee: Rudolf Kreitlein (West Germany)

26 July 1966 FIFA World Cup; Semi-finals	England	2–1	Portugal	London, England
	R. Charlton 30', 79'	Report	Eusébio 82' (pen.)	Stadium: Wembley Stadium; Attendance: 94,493; Referee: Pierre Schwinte (France)

30 July 1966 FIFA World Cup; Final	England	4–2 (a.e.t.)	West Germany	London, England
	Hurst 18', 102', 120'; Peters (yellow card) 20' (goal) 78'	Report	Haller 12'; Weber 90'	Stadium: Wembley Stadium; Attendance: 96,924; Referee: Gottfried Dienst (Switzerland)

22 October Home Championship; UEFA EC Qualifying; Group 8	Northern Ireland	0–2	England	Belfast, Northern Ireland
	Ferguson (red card)	Report	Hurst 40'; Peters 60'	Stadium: Windsor Park; Attendance: 48,500; Referee: Bobby Davidson (Scotland)

2 November International friendly	England	0–0	Czechoslovakia	London, England
		Report		Stadium: Wembley Stadium; Attendance: 75,000; Referee: Pieter Roomer (Netherlands)

16 November Home Championship; UEFA EC Qualifying; Group 8	England	5–1	Wales	London, England
	Hurst 30', 34'; R. Charlton 43'; Hennessey 80' (o.g.); J. Charlton 84'	Report	W. Davies 38'	Stadium: Wembley Stadium; Attendance: 76,000; Referee: Tiny Wharton (Scotland)

=== 1967 ===
15 April Home Championship; UEFA EC Qualifying; Group 8	England	2–3	Scotland	London, England
	J. Charlton 84'; Hurst 88'	Report	Law 27'; Lennox 78'; McCalliog 87'	Stadium: Wembley Stadium; Attendance: 99,063; Referee: Gerd Schulenberg (West Germany)

24 May International friendly	England	2–0	Spain	London, England
	Greaves 70'; Hunt 75'	Report		Stadium: Wembley Stadium; Attendance: 75,000; Referee: István Zsolt (Hungary)

27 May International friendly	Austria	0–1	England	Vienna, Austria
		Report	Ball 21'	Stadium: Praterstadion; Attendance: 85,000; Referee: Michel Kitabdjian (France)

21 October Home Championship; UEFA EC Qualifying; Group 8	Wales	0–3	England	Cardiff, Wales
		Report	Peters 34'; R. Charlton 87'; Ball 90' (pen.)	Stadium: Ninian Park; Attendance: 45,000; Referee: John Gordon (Scotland)

22 November Home Championship; UEFA EC Qualifying; Group 8	England	2–0	Northern Ireland	London, England
	Hurst 44'; R. Charlton 62'	Report		Stadium: Wembley Stadium; Attendance: 83,000; Referee: Leo Callaghan (Wales)

6 December International friendly	England	2–2	Soviet Union	London, England
	Ball 23'; Peters 72'	Report	Chislenko 42', 44'	Stadium: Wembley Stadium; Attendance: 93,000; Referee: Rudolf Kreitlein (West Germany)

=== 1968 ===
24 February Home Championship; UEFA EC Qualifying; Group 8	Scotland	1–1	England	Glasgow, Scotland
	Hughes 39'	Report	Peters 19'	Stadium: Hampden Park; Attendance: 134,000; Referee: Laurens van Ravens (Netherlands)

3 April UEFA EC Qualifying; Quarter-finals	England	1–0	Spain	London, England
	R. Charlton 84'	Report		Stadium: Wembley Stadium; Attendance: 100,000; Referee: Gilbert Droz (Switzerland)

8 May UEFA EC Qualifying; Quarter-finals	Spain	1–2 (1–3 agg.)	England	Madrid, Spain
	Amancio 48'	Report	Peters 54'; Hunter 81'	Stadium: Santiago Bernabéu Stadium; Attendance: 120,000; Referee: Josef Krnavek (Czechoslovakia)

22 May International friendly	England	3–1	Sweden	London, England
	Peters 36'; R. Charlton 38'; Hunt 72'	Report	Andersson 90'	Stadium: Wembley Stadium; Attendance: 72,500; Referee: Ottmar Huber (Switzerland)

1 June International friendly	West Germany	1–0	England	Hanover, West Germany
	Beckenbauer 82'	Report		Stadium: Niedersachsenstadion; Attendance: 79,250; Referee: Laurens van Ravens (Netherlands)

5 June UEFA Euro 1968 Semi-finals	Yugoslavia	1–0	England	Florence, Italy
	Džajić 87'	Report	Mullery (red card) 90'	Stadium: Stadio Comunale; Attendance: 40,000; Referee: José María Ortiz de Mendíbil (Spain)

8 June UEFA Euro 1968; Third place play-off	Soviet Union	0–2	England	Rome, Italy
		Report	R. Charlton 39'; Hurst 63'	Stadium: Stadio Olimpico; Attendance: 18,000; Referee: István Zsolt (Hungary)

6 November International friendly	Romania	0–0	England	Bucharest, Romania
		Report		Stadium: Stadium 23 August; Attendance: 62,000; Referee: Radoslav Fiala (Czechoslovakia)

11 December International friendly	England	1–1	Bulgaria	London, England
	Hurst 36'	Report	Asparuhov 32'	Stadium: Wembley Stadium; Attendance: 80,000; Referee: Michel Kitabdjian (France)

=== 1969 ===
15 January International friendly	England	1–1	Romania	London, England
	J. Charlton 27'	Report	Dumitrache 74' (pen.)	Stadium: Wembley Stadium; Attendance: 77,000; Referee: James Callaghan (Scotland)

12 March International friendly	England	5–0	France	London, England
	O'Grady 33'; Hurst 48' (pen.), 49', 80' (pen.); Lee 75'	Report		Stadium: Wembley Stadium; Attendance: 83,000; Referee: István Zsolt (Hungary)

3 May Home Championship	Northern Ireland	1–3	England	Belfast, Northern Ireland
	McMordie 63'	Report	Peters 39'; Lee 64'; Hurst 74' (pen.)	Stadium: Windsor Park; Attendance: 24,500; Referee: Bill Mullen (Scotland)

7 May Home Championship	England	2–1	Wales	London, England
19:45	R. Charlton 58'; Lee 72'	Report	R. Davies 18'	Stadium: Wembley Stadium; Attendance: 72,000; Referee: Jack Adair (Northern Ireland)

10 May Home Championship	England	4–1	Scotland	London, England
	Peters 16', 64'; Hurst 20', 60' (pen.)	Report	Stein 43'	Stadium: Wembley Stadium; Attendance: 89,902; Referee: Robert Héliès (France)

1 June International friendly	Mexico	0–0	England	Mexico City, Mexico
		Report		Stadium: Azteca Stadium; Attendance: 105,000; Referee: Alberto Tejada (Peru)

8 June International friendly	Uruguay	1–2	England	Montevideo, Uruguay
	Cubilla 53'	Report	Lee 16'; Hurst 80'	Stadium: Centenario Stadium; Attendance: 55,000; Referee: Armando Marques (Brazil)

12 June International friendly	Brazil	2–1	England	Rio de Janeiro, Brazil
	Tostão 79'; Jairzinho 81'	Report	Bell 13'	Stadium: Maracanã; Attendance: 125,000; Referee: Ramón Barreto (Uruguay)

5 November International friendly	Netherlands	0–1	England	Amsterdam, Netherlands
		Report	Bell 84'	Stadium: Olympic Stadium; Attendance: 40,000; Referee: Pavel Khazakov (Soviet Union)

10 December International friendly	England	1–0	Portugal	London, England
	J. Charlton 36'	Report	José (yellow card); Graça (yellow card)	Stadium: Wembley Stadium; Attendance: 100,000; Referee: Roger Mouton (France)

15 December International friendly	England	0–0	South Vietnam	London, England
				Stadium: Wembley Stadium; Attendance: 80,000; Referee: José María Ortiz de Mendíbil (Spain)

== 1970s ==
=== 1970 ===
14 January International friendly	England	0–0	Netherlands	London, England
		Report		Stadium: Wembley Stadium; Attendance: 75,000; Referee: Heinz Siebert (West Germany)

25 February International friendly	Belgium	1–3	England	Brussels, Belgium
	Dockx 58'	Report	Ball 27', 60'; Hurst 55'	Stadium: Astrid Park; Attendance: 20,500; Referee: A.S. Bardella (Italy)

18 April Home Championship	Wales	1–1	England	Cardiff, Wales
	Krzywicki 40'	Report	Lee 71'	Stadium: Ninian Park; Attendance: 50,000; Referee: Tiny Wharton (Scotland)

21 April Home Championship	England	3–1	Northern Ireland	London, England
	Peters 6'; Hurst 67'; R. Charlton 81'	Report	Best 50'	Stadium: Wembley Stadium; Attendance: 80,000; Referee: Gaspar Pintado Viú (Spain)

25 April Home Championship	Scotland	0–0	England	Glasgow, Scotland
		Report		Stadium: Hampden Park; Attendance: 137,438; Referee: Gerd Schulenberg (West Germany)

21 May International friendly	Colombia	0–4	England	Bogotá, Colombia
		Report	Peters 3', 38'; R. Charlton 55'; Ball 83'	Stadium: El Campín; Attendance: 28,000; Referee: R. Barrios (Venezuela)

24 May International friendly	Ecuador	0–2	England	Quito, Ecuador
		Report	Lee 4'; Kidd 75'	Stadium: Estadio Olímpico Atahualpa; Attendance: 22,250; Referee: Alberto Tejada (Peru)

2 June 1970 FIFA World Cup; Group 3	Romania	0–1	England	Guadalajara, Mexico
		Report	Hurst 65'	Stadium: Jalisco Stadium; Attendance: 50,000; Referee: Vital Loraux (Belgium)

7 June 1970 FIFA World Cup; Group 3	Brazil	1–0	England	Guadalajara, Mexico
	Jairzinho 59'	Report	Lee (yellow card)	Stadium: Jalisco Stadium; Attendance: 66,750; Referee: Abraham Klein (Israel)

11 June 1970 FIFA World Cup; Group 3	Czechoslovakia	0–1	England	Guadalajara, Mexico
	Dobiaš (yellow card)	Report	Clarke 50' (pen.)	Stadium: Jalisco Stadium; Attendance: 50,000; Referee: Roger Mâchin (France)

14 June 1970 FIFA World Cup; Quarter-finals	West Germany	3–2 (a.e.t.)	England	León, Mexico
	Beckenbauer 69'; Seeler 82'; Müller 108' (yellow card)	Report	Mullery 32'; Peters 50'; Lee (yellow card)	Stadium: Nou Camp; Attendance: 23,250; Referee: Ángel Norberto Coerezza (Argentina)

25 November International friendly	England	3–1	East Germany	London, England
	Lee 12'; Peters 21'; Clarke 63'	Report	Vogel 27'	Stadium: Wembley Stadium; Attendance: 93,000; Referee: Rudolf Scheurer (Switzerland)

=== 1971 ===
3 February UEFA EC Qualifying; Group 3	Malta	0–1	England	Gzira, Malta
		Report	Peters 35'	Stadium: Empire Stadium; Attendance: 20,000; Referee: Ferdinand Marschall (Austria)

21 April UEFA EC Qualifying; Group 3	England	3–0	Greece	London, England
	Chivers 23'; Hurst 68'; Lee 87'	Report		Stadium: Wembley Stadium; Attendance: 60,000; Referee: Martti Hirviniemi (Finland)

12 May UEFA EC Qualifying; Group 3	England	5–0	Malta	London, England
	Chivers 30', 48'; Lee 43'; Clarke 46' (pen.); Lawler 75'	Report		Stadium: Wembley Stadium; Attendance: 36,500; Referee: Einar Röed (Norway)

15 May Home Championship	Northern Ireland	0–1	England	Belfast, Northern Ireland
		Report	Clarke 80'	Stadium: Windsor Park; Attendance: 33,500; Referee: A. MacKenzie (Scotland)

19 May Home Championship	England	0–0	Wales	London, England
19:45		Report		Stadium: Wembley Stadium; Attendance: 70,000; Referee: Malcolm Wright (Northern Ireland)

22 May Home Championship	England	3–1	Scotland	London, England
	Peters 10'; Chivers 30', 40'	Report	Curran 12'; Bremner (yellow card)	Stadium: Wembley Stadium; Attendance: 91,469; Referee: Jef Dorpmans (Netherlands)

13 October UEFA EC Qualifying; Group 3	Switzerland	2–3	England	Basle, Switzerland
	Jeandupeux 11'; Künzli 44'	Report	Hurst 1'; Chivers 12'; Weibel 77' (o.g.)	Stadium: St. Jakob Stadium; Attendance: 58,000; Referee: Vital Loraux (Belgium)

10 November UEFA EC Qualifying; Group 3	England	1–1	Switzerland	London, England
	Summerbee 9' (yellow card); Lee (yellow card)	Report	Odermatt 26'	Stadium: Wembley Stadium; Attendance: 98,000; Referee: Constantin Barbalescu (Romania)

1 December UEFA EC Qualifying; Group 3	Greece	0–2	England	Athens, Greece
		Report	Hurst 57'; Chivers 90'	Stadium: Karaiskakis Stadium; Attendance: 42,000; Referee: José María Ortiz de Mendíbil (Spain)

=== 1972 ===
29 April UEFA EC Qualifying; Quarter-finals	England	1–3	West Germany	London, England
	Lee 77'	Report	Hoeneß 26'; Netzer 85' (pen.); Müller 89'	Stadium: Wembley Stadium; Attendance: 95,000; Referee: Robert Héliès (France)

13 May UEFA EC Qualifying; Quarter-finals	West Germany	0–0	England	Berlin, West Germany
		Report		Stadium: Olympiastadion; Attendance: 75,000; Referee: Milivoje Gugulović (Yugoslavia)

20 May Home Championship	Wales	0–3	England	Cardiff, Wales
		Report	Hughes 25'; Marsh 60'; Bell 61'	Stadium: Ninian Park; Attendance: 33,000; Referee: W. Mullan (Scotland)

23 May Home Championship	England	0–1	Northern Ireland	London, England
		Report	Neill 33'	Stadium: Wembley Stadium; Attendance: 43,000; Referee: W. Gow (Wales)

27 May Home Championship	Scotland	0–1	England	Glasgow, Scotland
	McNeill (yellow card); Hartford (yellow card)	Report	Ball 28'	Stadium: Hampden Park; Attendance: 119,325; Referee: Sergio Gonella (Italy)

11 October International friendly	England	1–1	Yugoslavia	London, England
	Royle 40'	Report	Vladić 50'	Stadium: Wembley Stadium; Attendance: 50,000; Referee: Aurelio Angonese (Italy)

15 November 1974 FIFA World Cup qualification Group 5	Wales	0–1	England	Cardiff, Wales
		Report	Bell 35'	Stadium: Ninian Park; Attendance: 39,000; Referee: W. Mullan (Scotland)

=== 1973 ===
24 January 1974 FIFA World Cup qualification Group 5	England	1–1	Wales	London, England
	Hunter 42'	Report	Toshack 23'	Stadium: Wembley Stadium; Attendance: 73,000; Referee: M. Wright (Northern Ireland)

14 February International friendly	Scotland	0–5	England	Glasgow, Scotland
		Report	Lorimer 6' (o.g.); Clarke 12', 85'; Channon 15'; Chivers 76'	Stadium: Hampden Park; Attendance: 48,470; Referee: Robert Wurtz (France)

12 May Home Championship	Northern Ireland	1–2	England	Liverpool, England
	Clements 22' (pen.)	Report	Chivers 9', 82'	Stadium: Goodison Park; Attendance: 32,000; Referee: Clive Thomas (Wales)

15 May Home Championship	England	3–0	Wales	London, England
	Chivers 23'; Channon 30'; Peters 67'	Report		Stadium: Wembley Stadium; Attendance: 39,000; Referee: John W. Paterson (Scotland)

19 May Home Championship	England	1–0	Scotland	London, England
	Peters 54'	Report		Stadium: Wembley Stadium; Attendance: 95,950; Referee: Kurt Tschenscher (West Germany)

27 May International friendly	Czechoslovakia	1–1	England	Prague, Czechoslovakia
	Novak 55'	Report	Clarke 89'	Stadium: Letná Stadium; Attendance: 25,000; Referee: Rudi Glöckner (East Germany)

6 June 1974 FIFA World Cup qualification Group 5	Poland	2–0	England	Chorzów, Poland
	Gadocha 7'; Lubański 47'	Report	Ball (red card) 76'	Stadium: Silesian Stadium; Attendance: 73,714; Referee: Paul Schiller (Austria)

10 June International friendly	Soviet Union	1–2	England	Moscow, Soviet Union
	Muntyan 66'	Report	Chivers 10'; Khurtsilava 55' (o.g.)	Stadium: Lenin Stadium; Attendance: 85,000; Referee: Wolfgang Riedel (East Germany)

14 June International friendly	Italy	2–0	England	Turin, Italy
	Anastasi 38'; Capello 52'	Report		Stadium: Stadio Comunale; Attendance: 52,000; Referee: Tsvetan Stanev (Bulgaria)

26 September International friendly	England	7–0	Austria	London, England
	Channon 9', 47'; Clarke 28', 43'; Chivers 61'; Currie 65'; Bell 89'	Report		Stadium: Wembley Stadium; Attendance: 48,000; Referee: Charles Corver (Netherlands)

17 October 1974 FIFA World Cup qualification Group 5	England	1–1	Poland	London, England
	Clarke 63' (pen.); McFarland (yellow card)	Report	Domarski 57'; Musiał (yellow card)	Stadium: Wembley Stadium; Attendance: 100,000; Referee: Vital Loraux (Belgium)

14 November International friendly	England	0–1	Italy	London, England
		Report	Capello 86'	Stadium: Wembley Stadium; Attendance: 95,000; Referee: F. Marques Lobo (Portugal)

=== 1974 ===
3 April International friendly	Portugal	0–0	England	Lisbon, Portugal
		Report		Stadium: Stadium of Light; Attendance: 15,000; Referee: Emilio Guruceta (Spain)

11 May Home Championship	Wales	0–2	England	Cardiff, Wales
		Report	Bowles 35'; Keegan 47'	Stadium: Ninian Park; Attendance: 26,000; Referee: R. McFadden (Northern Ireland)

15 May Home Championship	England	1–0	Northern Ireland	London, England
	Weller 73'	Report		Stadium: Wembley Stadium; Attendance: 47,000; Referee: Bobby Davidson (Scotland)

18 May Home Championship	Scotland	2–0	England	Glasgow, Scotland
	Jordan 4'; Todd 30' (o.g.)	Report		Stadium: Hampden Park; Attendance: 94,487; Referee: Leonardus van der Kroft (Netherlands)

22 May International friendly	England	2–2	Argentina	London, England
	Channon 45'; Worthington 55'	Report	Kempes 59', 89' (pen.)	Stadium: Wembley Stadium; Attendance: 68,000; Referee: Arturo Ithurralde (Argentina)

29 May International friendly	East Germany	1–1	England	Leipzig, East Germany
	Streich 66'	Report	Channon 68'	Stadium: Zentralstadion; Attendance: 100,000; Referee: Gyorgy Müncz (Hungary)

1 June International friendly	Bulgaria	0–1	England	Sofia, Bulgaria
		Report	Worthington 44'	Stadium: Levski Stadium; Referee: Rolf Nyhus (Norway)

5 June International friendly	Yugoslavia	2–2	England	Belgrade, Yugoslavia
	Petković 23'; Oblak 46'	Report	Channon 6'; Keegan 75'	Stadium: Red Star Stadium; Referee: Sergio Gonella (Italy)

30 October UEFA EC Qualifying; Group 1	England	3–0	Czechoslovakia	London, England
	Channon 72'; Bell 80', 83'	Report	Pekárik (yellow card)	Stadium: Wembley Stadium; Attendance: 85,000; Referee: Michel Kitabdjian (France)

20 November UEFA EC Qualifying; Group 1	England	0–0	Portugal	London, England
		Report	Correia (yellow card); Osvaldinho (yellow card)	Stadium: Wembley Stadium; Attendance: 70,750; Referee: Anton Buchelli (Switzerland)

=== 1975 ===
12 March International friendly	England	2–0	West Germany	London, England
	Bell 25'; Macdonald 66'	Report		Stadium: Wembley Stadium; Attendance: 98,000; Referee: Robert Schaut (Belgium)

16 April UEFA EC Qualifying; Group 1	England	5–0	Cyprus	London, England
	Macdonald 3', 32', 52', 56', 87'	Report	Kovis (yellow card)	Stadium: Wembley Stadium; Attendance: 65,000; Referee: Martti Hirviniemi (Finland)

11 May UEFA EC Qualifying; Group 1	Cyprus	0–1	England	Limassol, Cyprus
		Report	Keegan 6'	Stadium: Tsirion Stadium; Attendance: 21,000; Referee: Tzvetan Staven (Bulgaria)

17 May Home Championship	Northern Ireland	0–0	England	Belfast, Northern Ireland
		Report		Stadium: Windsor Park; Attendance: 36,000; Referee: Thomas Reynolds (Wales)

21 May Home Championship	England	2–2	Wales	London, England
	Johnson 10', 71'	Report	Toshack 56'; Griffiths 67'	Stadium: Wembley Stadium; Attendance: 51,000; Referee: John W. Paterson (Scotland)

24 May Home Championship	England	5–1	Scotland	London, England
	Francis 6', 63'; Beattie 7'; Bell 40'; Johnson 73'	Report	Rioch 44' (pen.)	Stadium: Wembley Stadium; Attendance: 98,241; Referee: Rudi Glöckner (East Germany)

3 September International friendly	Switzerland	1–2	England	Basle, Switzerland
	Müller 30'	Report	Keegan 7'; Channon 18'	Stadium: St. Jakob Stadium; Attendance: 25,000; Referee: Walter Eschweiler (West Germany)

30 October UEFA EC Qualifying; Group 1	Czechoslovakia	2–1	England	Bratislava, Czechoslovakia
	Nehoda 45'; Gallis 47'; Jurkemik (yellow card)	Report	Channon 26'; Gillard (yellow card)	Stadium: Tehelné pole Attendance: 45,000; Referee: Alberto Michelotti (Italy)

19 November UEFA EC Qualifying; Group 1	Portugal	1–1	England	Lisbon, Portugal
	Rodrigues 15'	Report	Channon 42'; Beattie (yellow card)	Stadium: José Alvalade Stadium; Attendance: 30,000; Referee: Erich Linemayr (Austria)

=== 1976 ===
24 March International friendly	Wales	1–2	England	Wrexham, Wales
	Curtis 90'	Report	Kennedy 70'; Taylor 80'	Stadium: Racecourse Ground; Attendance: 21,000; Referee: Ian Foote (Scotland)

8 May Home Championship	Wales	0–1	England	Cardiff, Wales
		Report	Taylor 59'	Stadium: Ninian Park; Attendance: 24,500; Referee: Bobby Davidson (Scotland)

11 May Home Championship	England	4–0	Northern Ireland	London, England
	Francis 35'; Channon 36' (pen.), 77'; Pearson 60'	Report		Stadium: Wembley Stadium; Attendance: 48,000; Referee: Clive Thomas (Wales)

15 May Home Championship	Scotland	2–1	England	Glasgow, Scotland
	Masson 18'; Dalglish 49'	Report	Channon 11'	Stadium: Hampden Park; Attendance: 85,165; Referee: Károly Palotai (Hungary)

23 May USA Bicentennial; Tournament	Brazil	1–0	England	Los Angeles, USA
	Roberto Dinamite 89'	Report		Stadium: Memorial Coliseum; Attendance: 32,495; Referee: Hans-Joachim Weiland (West Germany)

28 May USA Bicentennial; Tournament	Italy	2–3	England	New York, USA
	Graziani 15', 18'	Report	Channon 46', 53'; Thompson 48'	Stadium: Yankee Stadium; Attendance: 40,750; Referee: Hans-Joachim Weiland (West Germany)

31 May USA Bicentennial; Tournament	Team America (United States)	1–3	England	Philadelphia, USA
	Scullion 86'	Report	Keegan 23', 29'; Francis 54'	Stadium: John F. Kennedy Stadium; Attendance: 16,239; Referee: Hans-Joachim Weiland (West Germany)

13 June 1978 FIFA World Cup qualification Group 2	Finland	1–4	England	Helsinki, Finland
	Paatelainen 27'	Report	Pearson 14'; Keegan 30', 60'; Channon 56'	Stadium: Olympic Stadium; Attendance: 24,500; Referee: Alfred Delcourt (Belgium)

8 September International friendly	England	1–1	Republic of Ireland	London, England
	Pearson 45'	Report	Daly 52' (pen.)	Stadium: Wembley Stadium; Referee: Hugh Alexander (Scotland)

13 October 1978 FIFA World Cup qualification Group 2	England	2–1	Finland	London, England
20:00	Tueart 4'; Royle 52'	Report	Nieminen 48'	Stadium: Wembley Stadium; Attendance: 24,500; Referee: Ulf Eriksson (Sweden)

17 November 1978 FIFA World Cup qualification Group 2	Italy	2–0	England	Rome, Italy
	Antognoni 36'; Bettega 77'; Cuccureddu (yellow card)	Report	Channon (yellow card)	Stadium: Stadio Olimpico; Attendance: 70,750; Referee: Abraham Klein (Israel)

=== 1977 ===
9 February International friendly	England	0–2	Netherlands	London, England
20:00		Report	Peters 28', 36'; Rijsbergen (yellow card)	Stadium: Wembley Stadium; Attendance: 90,000; Referee: Walter Eschweiler (West Germany)

30 March 1978 FIFA World Cup qualification Group 2	England	5–0	Luxembourg	London, England
20:00	Keegan 10'; Francis 58'; Kennedy 63'; Channon 69', 81' (pen.)	Report	Dresch (yellow card) (yellow-red card)	Stadium: Wembley Stadium; Attendance: 78,500; Referee: Paul Bonett (Malta)

28 May Home Championship	Northern Ireland	1–2	England	Belfast, Northern Ireland
	McGrath 4'	Report	Channon 27'; Tueart 86'	Stadium: Windsor Park; Attendance: 34,000; Referee: Brian McGinlay (Scotland)

31 May Home Championship	England	0–1	Wales	London, England
20:00		Report	James 44' (pen.); Yorath (yellow card)	Stadium: Wembley Stadium; Attendance: 48,000; Referee: John Gordon (Scotland)

4 June Home Championship	England	1–2	Scotland	London, England
	Channon 87' (pen.)	Report	McQueen 43'; Dalglish 59'; Donachie (yellow card); Johnston (red card)	Stadium: Wembley Stadium; Attendance: 100,000; Referee: Károly Palotai (Hungary)

8 June International friendly	Brazil	0–0	England	Rio de Janeiro, Brazil
		Report		Stadium: Maracanã; Referee: Alberto Ducatelli (Argentina)

12 June International friendly	Argentina	1–1	England	Buenos Aires, Argentina
	Bertoni 15' (red card) 83'	Report	Pearson 3'; Cherry (red card) 83'	Stadium: La Bombonera; Referee: Ramón Barreto (Uruguay)

15 June International friendly	Uruguay	0–0	England	Montevideo, Uruguay
		Report		Stadium: Centenario; Referee: M. Comesena (Argentina)

7 September International friendly	England	0–0	Switzerland	London, England
		Report		Stadium: Wembley Stadium; Attendance: 90,000; Referee: Georges Konrath (France)

12 October 1978 FIFA World Cup qualification Group 2	Luxembourg	0–2	England	Luxembourg, Luxembourg
		Report	Kennedy 31'; Mariner 90'	Stadium: Stade Josy Barthel; Attendance: 9,250; Referee: Alojzy Jarguz (Poland)

16 November 1978 FIFA World Cup qualification Group 2	England	2–0	Italy	London, England
	Keegan 11' (yellow card); Brooking 80'	Report	Gentile (yellow card); Benetti (yellow card)	Stadium: Wembley Stadium; Attendance: 92,000; Referee: Károly Palotai (Hungary)

=== 1978 ===
22 February International friendly	West Germany	2–1	England	Munich, West Germany
	Worm 79'; Bonhof 86'	Report	Pearson 41'; Wilkins (yellow card)	Stadium: Olympiastadion; Attendance: 78,000; Referee: Franz Wöhrer (Austria)

19 April International friendly	England	1–1	Brazil	London, England
	Keegan 70'; Latchford (yellow card)	Report	Gil 10'; Zé Maria (yellow card); Braga (yellow card); Edinho (yellow card); Cerezo (yellow card); Batista (yellow card)	Stadium: Wembley Stadium; Attendance: 92,000; Referee: Charles Corver (Netherlands)

13 May Home Championship	Wales	1–3	England	Cardiff, Wales
	Dwyer 63'	Report	Latchford 8'; Currie 82'; Barnes 89'	Stadium: Ninian Park; Attendance: 17,750; Referee: Malcolm Moffatt (Northern Ireland)

16 May Home Championship	England	1–0	Northern Ireland	London, England
	Neal 45'	Report		Stadium: Wembley Stadium; Attendance: 48,000; Referee: John Gordon (Scotland)

20 May Home Championship	Scotland	0–1	England	Glasgow, Scotland
	Jordan (yellow card)	Report	Coppell 82'	Stadium: Hampden Park; Attendance: 90,000; Referee: Georges Konrath (France)

24 May International friendly	England	4–1	Hungary	London, England
	Barnes 10'; Neal 29' (pen.); Francis 31'; Currie 76'; Greenhoff (yellow card)	Report	Nagy 62'; Tóth (yellow card); Nagy (yellow card)	Stadium: Wembley Stadium; Attendance: 75,000; Referee: René Vigliani (France)

20 September UEFA EC Qualifying; Group 1	Denmark	3–4	England	Copenhagen, Denmark
	Simonsen 23' (pen.); Arnesen 27'; Røntved 86'	Report	Keegan 17', 22'; Latchford 51'; Neal 84'	Stadium: Idrætsparken; Attendance: 48,000; Referee: Adolf Prokop (East Germany)

25 October UEFA EC Qualifying; Group 1	Republic of Ireland	1–1	England	Dublin, Republic of Ireland
	Daly 27'	Report	Latchford 8'	Stadium: Dalymount Park; Attendance: 48,000; Referee: Heinz Aldinger (West Germany)

29 November International friendly	England	1–0	Czechoslovakia	London, England
19:45	Coppell 69'	Report		Stadium: Wembley Stadium; Referee: Erich Linemayr (Austria)

=== 1979 ===
7 February UEFA EC Qualifying; Group 1	England	4–0	Northern Ireland	London, England
	Keegan 24'; Latchford 46', 63'; Watson 49'	Report		Stadium: Wembley Stadium; Attendance: 92,000; Referee: Ulf Eriksson (Sweden)

19 May Home Championship	Northern Ireland	0–2	England	Belfast, Northern Ireland
		Report	Watson 11'; Coppell 14'	Stadium: Windsor Park; Attendance: 24,000; Referee: Ian Foote (Scotland)

23 May Home Championship	England	0–0	Wales	London, England
		Report		Stadium: Wembley Stadium; Attendance: 70,250; Referee: Malcolm Moffatt (Northern Ireland)

26 May Home Championship	England	3–1	Scotland	London, England
	Barnes 45'; Coppell 63'; Keegan 70'	Report	Wark 21'	Stadium: Wembley Stadium; Attendance: 95,000; Referee: António José da Silva Garrido (Portugal)

6 June UEFA EC Qualifying; Group 1	Bulgaria	0–3	England	Sofia, Bulgaria
		Report	Keegan 33'; Watson 53'; Barnes 54'	Stadium: Levski Stadium; Attendance: 50,000; Referee: Ernst Dörflinger (Switzerland)

10 June International friendly	Sweden	0–0	England	Solna, Sweden
		Report		Stadium: Råsunda Stadium; Referee: Erich Linemayr (Austria)

13 June International friendly	Austria	4–3	England	Vienna, Austria
	Pezzey 19', 70'; Welzl 26', 41'; Hattenberger (yellow card)	Report	Keegan 27'; Coppell 47'; Wilkins 64'; Thompson (yellow card); Keegan (yellow card)	Stadium: Praterstadion; Referee: Alexis Ponnet (Belgium)

12 September UEFA EC Qualifying; Group 1	England	1–0	Denmark	London, England
	Keegan 17'	Report	Elkjær (yellow card)	Stadium: Wembley Stadium; Attendance: 85,000; Referee: César Correia Diaz da Luz (Portugal)

17 October UEFA EC Qualifying; Group 1	Northern Ireland	1–5	England	Belfast, Northern Ireland
	Moreland 50' (pen.)	Report	Francis 18', 62'; Woodcock 34', 71'; Nicholl 74' (o.g.)	Stadium: Windsor Park; Attendance: 55,000; Referee: Alexis Ponnet (Belgium)

22 November UEFA EC Qualifying; Group 1	England	2–0	Bulgaria	London, England
	Watson 9'; Hoddle 68'	Report		Stadium: Wembley Stadium; Attendance: 72,000; Referee: Erik Fredriksson (Sweden)
