= England–Scotland football rivalry =

Football rivalry between the national football teams of England and Scotland

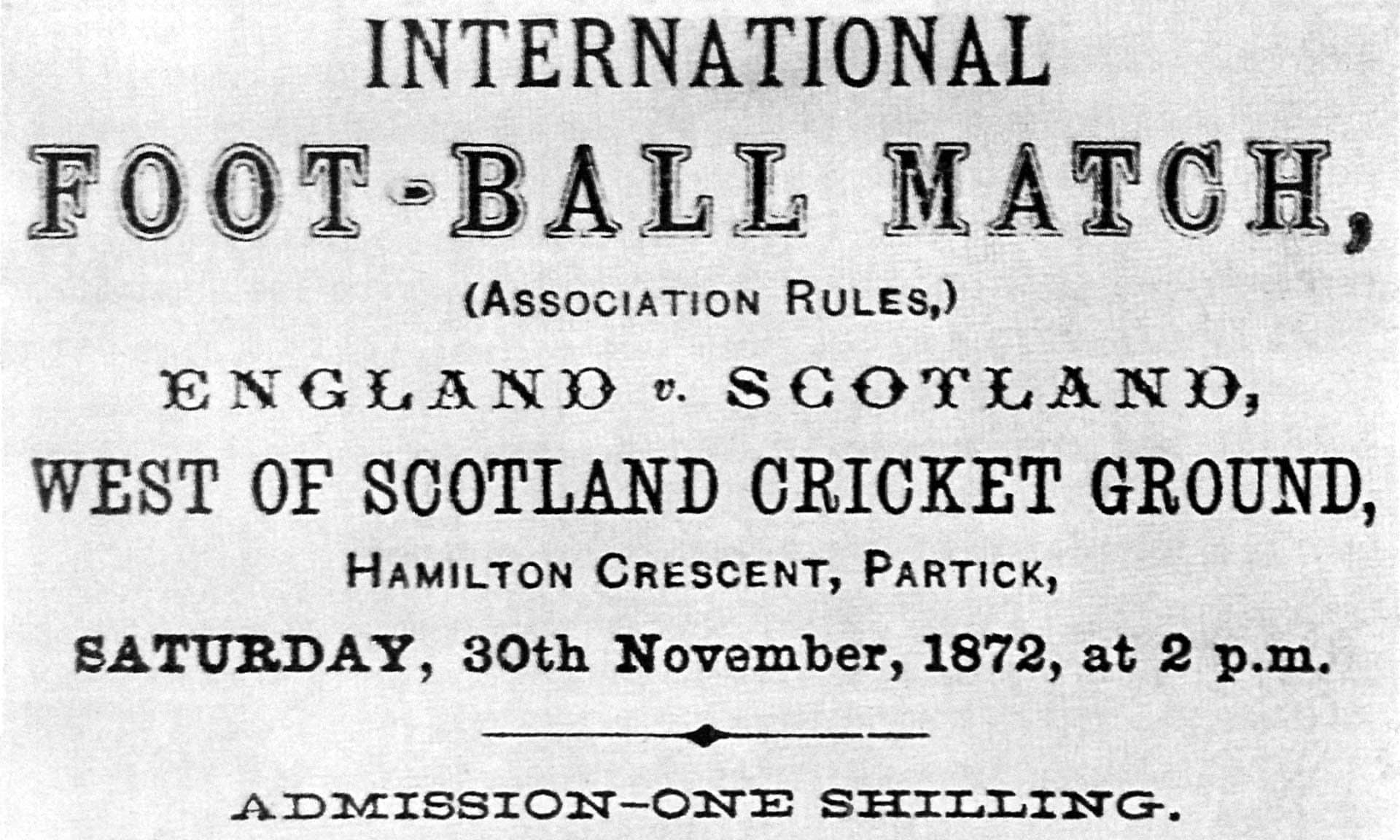
- Newspaper advertisement for the first official international football match.
- Location: Europe
- Teams: England; Scotland
- First meeting: 30 November 1872; Friendly; Scotland 0–0 England
- Latest meeting: 12 September 2023; Friendly; Scotland 1–3 England

Statistics
- Total meetings: 116
- Most wins: England (49)
- All-time series: 49–41–26 for England
- Largest victory: England 9–3 Scotland (15 April 1961)

The England–Scotland football rivalry, between the England and Scotland national football teams, is the oldest international fixture in the world, first played in 1872 at Hamilton Crescent, Glasgow. The first match took place at Hamilton Crescent, Glasgow, in 1872 and ended in a 0–0 draw. Scottish nationalism has been a factor in the Scots' desire to defeat England above all other rivals, with Scottish sports journalists traditionally referring to the English as the "Auld Enemy".

BBC Online commented that the games "have represented all that is good and all that is bad about football since the fixture began," while newspaper once reported that "for millions across both sides of the border the encounter represents a chance for the ultimate victory over the enemy." As of 2023, the teams have played 116 matches; England have won 49, Scotland 41, and there have been 26 draws.

== Background and early years ==
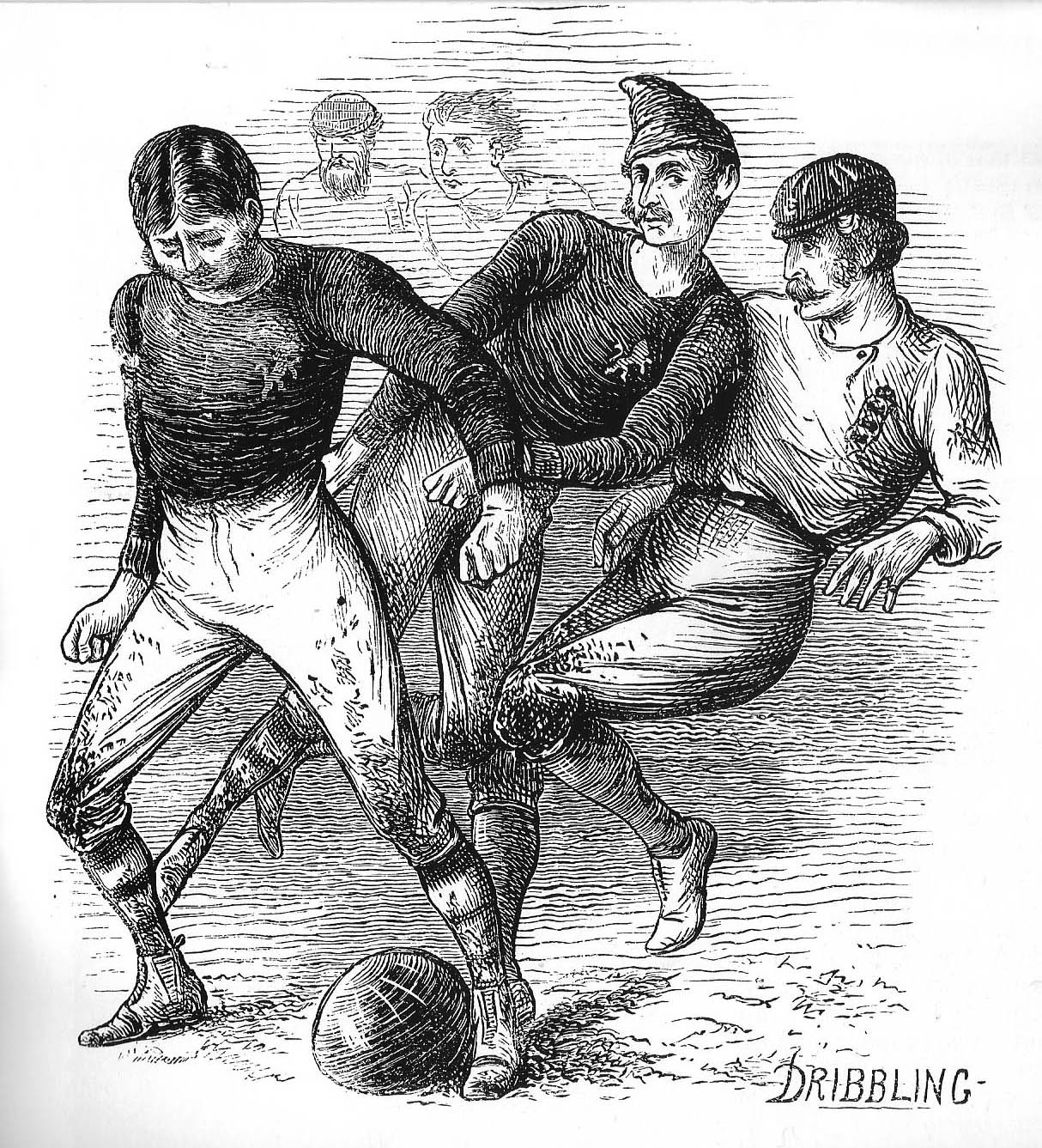
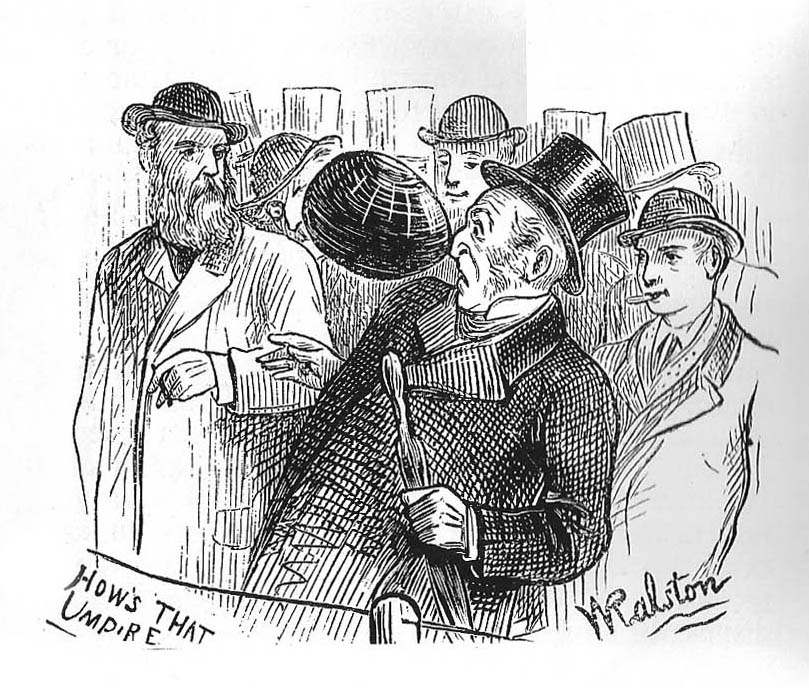
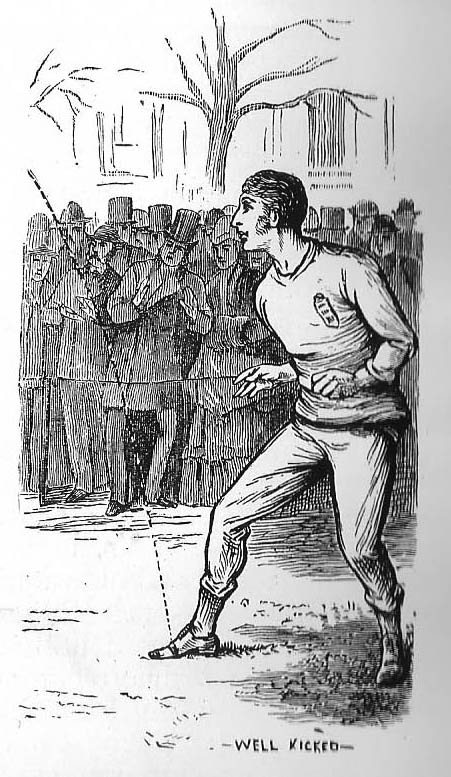
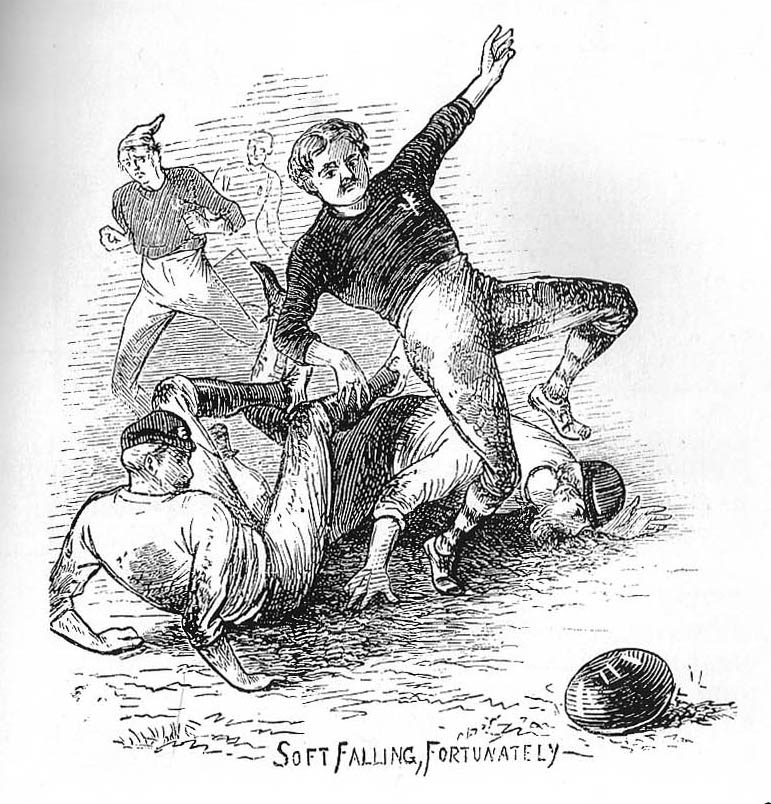
Illustrations of the first international at Hamilton Crescent, by William Ralston.

The rules of association football had been formalised and set down by The Football Association in England in 1863. By 1870 C. W. Alcock, Secretary of The Football Association, issued public challenges in various Scottish newspapers, including The Glasgow Herald, to Scottish players to play an international match against England. One of the few public responses that Alcock received from Scotland stated that "devotees of the 'association' rules will find no foeman worthy of their steel in Scotland." Alcock ardently defended that the right to play in these matches "was open to every Scotchman whether his lines were cast North or South of the Tweed". The first match was described in the Glasgow Herald as "the great international football match" and there was acceptance by the same newspaper in 1871 that "both captains had been successful in the composition of elevens capable of efficiently representing their respective causes."

Although the five matches played between 5 March 1870 and 24 February 1872 are not currently recognised by FIFA as official, they were organised under the auspices of the FA and were described as "international" by The Scotsman newspaper. In 1870, Alcock had even suggested that the next international match should be held near the England-Scotland border as an easily accessible venue for both teams, but this did not receive a response. Requests for Scotland-based players to partake were issued for each of these five matches, for example in November 1870:

any Scotch players who may be desirous of assisting their country ... may communicate with Messrs A F Kinnaird.

The matches are notable not just for being the first international matches, but also for illustrating emerging team playing tactics. For example, in the November 1870 match onlookers were treated to a match with "many scientific points" and in 1871 players (including Alcock) are noted to have been "acting in concert", leading to a goal"

England v Scotland 1870–72: scores and results list Scotland's goal tally first.

Date	Venue	Result	Competition	Location	Winner
5 March 1870	The Oval, London	1–1	Friendly	(England)	Draw
19 November 1870	The Oval, London	0–1	Friendly	(England)	(England)
25 February 1871	The Oval, London	1–1	Friendly	(England)	Draw
17 November 1871	The Oval, London	1–2	Friendly	(England)	(England)
24 February 1872	The Oval, London	0–1	Friendly	(England)	(England)

In 1872 a challenge match was agreed with the Glasgow team Queen's Park, who would represent Scotland. The FA's minutes of 3 October 1872 note that:

In order to further the interests of the Association in Scotland, it was decided that during the current season, a team should be sent to Glasgow to play a match v Scotland.

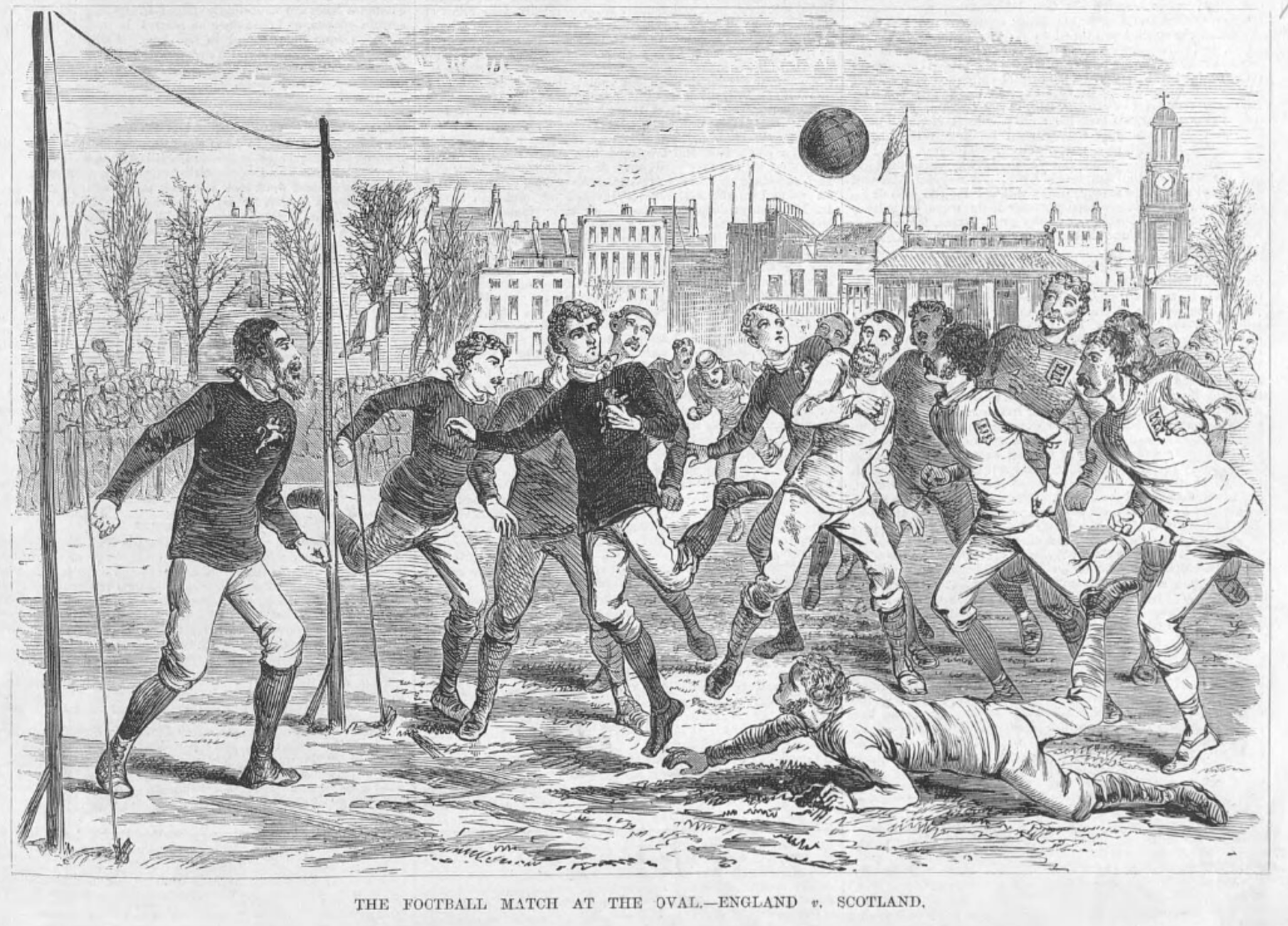
In April 1879, England beat Scotland 5–4 at The Oval

According to The Scotsman newspaper of 2 December 1872, there were only about ten football clubs in Scotland. These early international matches helped to increase the popularity of association football in Scotland. The first official match was held on 30 November 1872, on Scotland's national saint's day, St. Andrew's Day, and it took place at Hamilton Crescent in Partick, home of the West of Scotland Cricket Club. The Scotland team was made up entirely of players from Queen's Park, the most successful Scottish club of the period. The game ended a 0–0 draw, watched by a crowd of 4000 who had paid a shilling each for admission.

The first goal between the two sides was scored by England's William Kenyon-Slaney in the next game at The Oval, the first official match between the two in England, which the English won 4–2 on 8 March 1873. Following this, the game became an annual event, being held in England or Scotland in alternate years. Scotland took their first win in the fixture in the 1874 game, again played at Hamilton Crescent, where they defeated England 2–1. Later in the 1870s Scotland won the fixture three times in a row, including a 7–2 victory in the 1878 game.

== Famous matches in the annual series ==
From the first match in late 1872, England and Scotland played each other in the spring of every year (except during World War I and World War II) until 1989. From 1884 until 1984, the match was the highlight of the annual British Home Championship played between England, Scotland, Wales and Northern Ireland. (Note: Northern Ireland were only in the British Home Championship after 1950. Before then, a team representing the whole of Ireland selected by the Irish Football Association was in the Championship. This change was due to the secession of the Republic of Ireland from the United Kingdom of Great Britain and Ireland.) Due to the capacity of Hampden Park in the period, the fixture drew some of the largest ever football crowds, including the enduring European record attendance of 149,415 in 1937 (even though there was little to play for in that match: Wales had already won the series). After the British Home Championship ended in 1984, the annual England v Scotland fixture continued in the form of the Rous Cup until 1989.

The only exception to this pattern of annual fixtures in the spring was in 1973, when there were two games. The first game that year was a friendly match that marked the centenary of the Scottish Football Association. There were also two fixtures staged in 1902, but this was because the first game had to be abandoned due to the first Ibrox disaster. The British Home Championship also acted as qualifiers for three major tournaments – the 1950 World Cup, the 1954 World Cup and the 1968 European Championship.

=== 1928 ===
The 1928 Scotland team which defeated England 5–1 at Wembley was nicknamed the Wembley Wizards. The match had an unusual background; England and Scotland were the two traditionally dominant countries in the British Home Championship, yet neither side had managed to beat either Ireland or Wales in their first two games of that year's Championship.

==== Match summary ====
31 March 1928 1927–28 British Home Championship	England	1–5	Scotland	Middlesex
12:30	Kelly 89'		Jackson 3', 65', 85'; James 44', 74'	Stadium: Wembley Stadium; Attendance: 80,868; Referee: William Bell (Scotland)

=== 1961 ===
The game played in 1961 saw Scotland suffer their heaviest defeat in the fixture. The performance of Scotland goalkeeper Frank Haffey contributed towards the English stereotype of bad Scottish goalkeepers. "What time is it?" "Nine past Haffey", was a popular joke for many years. England players Jimmy Armfield and Johnny Haynes insisted that the result was more due to the quality of their forward play, and that Haffey could not have done much else to prevent most of the goals.

==== Match summary ====
15 April 1961 1960–61 British Home Championship	England	9–3	Scotland	Middlesex
	Robson 9'; Greaves 21', 30', 83'; Douglas 55'; Smith 73', 85'; Haynes 78', 82'	Report (page 9)	Mackay 48'; Wilson 53', 75' (Note: The Scottish Football Association archive credits the 3rd Scotland goal to Davie Wilson, and footage from the match (Footage #1 – 2:05 and Footage #2 – 1:29) appears to confirm this; most sources (and the contemporary commentary on the footage) credit the goal to Pat Quinn)	Stadium: Wembley Stadium; Attendance: 97,350; Referee: Marcel Lequesne (France)

=== 1967 ===
England had won the 1966 FIFA World Cup at Wembley less than a year before the 1967 game, and were undefeated in 19 games. Despite fielding four of the Celtic side that went on to win the European Cup a month later and stars such as Denis Law, Jim Baxter and Billy Bremner, Scotland were massive underdogs going into the match. Scotland took an early lead through a goal by Law, and Bobby Lennox put Scotland 2–0 up with just 12 minutes remaining. England were somewhat hampered by the fact that Jack Charlton suffered an injury early in the game. At that time, the rules governing international football prevented the England manager Alf Ramsey from substituting Charlton, so he decided to use him in the unfamiliar role of centre forward. Ironically, Charlton scored England's first goal. Scotland soon reestablished a two-goal lead, however, with Jim McCalliog making the score 3–1. Geoff Hurst scored a late goal to make the final score 3–2 to Scotland.

Baxter played "keepie uppie" as Scotland toyed with their opponents late in the game. The Scots playfully claimed afterwards that the victory made them unofficial world champions. Ultimately, however, it was England who qualified for the 1968 European Championship because of results in the other matches.

==== Match summary ====
15 April 1967 1966–67 British Home Championship	England	2–3	Scotland	London
	J. Charlton 84'; Hurst 88'	Report (page 4)	Law 27'; Lennox 78'; McCalliog 87'	Stadium: Wembley Stadium; Attendance: 99,063; Referee: Gerhard Schulenburg (West Germany)

=== 1977 ===
At the end of the 1977 match, the Scottish fans invaded the pitch, ripping up large sections of it and tearing down the goalposts. The match itself was a triumph for the new Scotland manager Ally MacLeod and contributed to the sense of optimism that built towards Scotland's participation in the 1978 FIFA World Cup. Gordon McQueen opened the scoring late in the first half with a powerful header from a crossed free-kick from the left-hand side. Kenny Dalglish doubled Scotland's advantage with a scrambled effort, before England scored a late consolation goal from a penalty kick taken by Mick Channon. The defeat hastened the end of Don Revie's tenure as England manager.

==== Match summary ====
4 June 1977 1976–77 British Home Championship	England	1–2	Scotland	London
	Channon 87' (pen.)	Report (page 16)	McQueen 42'; Dalglish 60'	Stadium: Wembley Stadium; Attendance: 98,103; Referee: Károly Palotai (Hungary)

== Matches since the end of the annual series ==
=== 1996 European Championship ===
In December 1995, despite media rumours that UEFA would deliberately keep the two apart in the draw, England and Scotland were both drawn in the same group for the forthcoming European Championship, to be hosted by England in the summer of 1996. This draw excited much comment and anticipation in the build-up to the championship, especially as it would be the first meeting between the two sides for seven years, and tickets for the game sold out within two days of the draw being made. The match assumed even greater significance for both teams when both England and Scotland drew their opening fixtures, against Switzerland and the Netherlands respectively, meaning both were even more in need of a win to further their chances of progressing in the tournament.

The match was played at Wembley Stadium on Saturday 15 June 1996. Before the game, Scotland's national anthem, Flower of Scotland, was completely drowned out by booing from English spectators. The first half was closely fought, ending 0–0, although Scotland had the better of the chances. The introduction of Jamie Redknapp into the England team as a substitute for the second half helped to turn the match in England's favour, and they took the lead through a headed goal by Alan Shearer. Scotland were awarded a penalty kick in the 76th minute after a foul by Tony Adams on Gordon Durie, but Gary McAllister's kick was saved by the England goalkeeper David Seaman. Shortly afterwards, Paul Gascoigne, who played in Scotland for the Glasgow club Rangers, scored a second goal for England, after chipping the ball over Scottish defender Colin Hendry. In 2006, the year before he became Prime Minister, Gordon Brown drew criticism in Scotland when he was reported as saying that Gascoigne's goal was one of his favourite moments in football, although Brown subsequently denied saying this.

Scotland eventually went out of the championship on goals scored, but would have proceeded beyond the first round of a tournament for the first time in their history had England not conceded a late goal in their 4–1 victory over the Netherlands in their final group game. The Guardian newspaper later commented that "England fans' joy was complete when Patrick Kluivert stole a late goal for the Dutch team – and thereby deprived Scotland of a place in the quarter-finals".

15 June 1996 Euro '96	Scotland	0–2	England	London (Note: Although the match was played at Wembley Stadium and was effectively a home game for England, Scotland had been drawn as the "home" team in the tie)
15:00		(Report)	Shearer 53'; Gascoigne 79'	Stadium: Wembley Stadium; Attendance: 76,684; Referee: Pierluigi Pairetto (Italy)

=== 2000 European Championship play-off ===
The Euro 96 game had encouraged some to call for the resumption of regular matches between the two, but this did not happen. The teams did not meet again until three years later, in 1999, when they were again drawn together in the European Championship; this time in a qualifying play-off for the 2000 tournament, after both teams had finished as runners-up in their respective qualifying groups.

The tie took place over two legs, the first in Scotland at Hampden Park on Saturday 13 November 1999, with the return leg at Wembley four days later. The first leg was the first match contested by the two sides in Scotland for ten years. England won that match 2–0, with both goals scored by Paul Scholes. There was crowd trouble following the game, and 51 people were arrested in the city centre of Glasgow after battles between fans. Scotland had the better of the second match, winning 1–0 with a goal from Don Hutchison and coming close to a second goal, but England progressed to the finals of the tournament, winning 2–1 on aggregate.

13 November 1999 Euro 2000 playoffs	Scotland	0–2	England	Glasgow
15:00		(Report)	Scholes 21', 41'	Stadium: Hampden Park; Attendance: 50,132; Referee: Manuel Diaz Vega (Spain)

17 November 1999 Euro 2000 playoffs	England	0–1 (2–1 agg.)	Scotland	London
19:45		(Report)	Hutchison 39'	Stadium: Wembley Stadium; Attendance: 76,848; Referee: Pierluigi Collina (Italy)

=== August 2013 and November 2014 friendlies ===
In the early 21st century there were suggestions that the British Home Championship should be restored to the schedule, or at least for the England v Scotland fixture to be played more regularly. There was some speculation that England would invite Scotland to be their first opponents when Wembley Stadium was re-opened in 2007, but this did not happen. There was further talk of organising a one-off England v Scotland match at the end of the 2007–08 season, but the Scotland manager George Burley was opposed to this timing and the match was not arranged. On 16 June 2012, The Football Association announced that England would play Scotland in August 2013 as part of their 150th anniversary celebrations. England won an entertaining friendly fixture by 3–2, after Scotland had twice taken the lead.

14 August 2013 Friendly	England	3–2	Scotland	London
20:00	Walcott 29'; Welbeck 53'; Lambert 70'	Report	Morrison 11'; Miller 49'	Stadium: Wembley Stadium; Attendance: 80,485; Referee: Felix Brych (Germany)

It was announced in July 2014 that a return match would be played at Celtic Park on 18 November 2014, as an option for a return match had been included in the contract for the August 2013 friendly. Wayne Rooney scored twice in a 3–1 victory for England.

18 November 2014 Friendly	Scotland	1–3	England	Glasgow
20:00	Robertson 83'	Report	Oxlade-Chamberlain 32'; Rooney 47', 85'	Stadium: Celtic Park; Attendance: 55,000; Referee: Jonas Eriksson (Sweden)

=== 2018 World Cup qualification ===
The two teams were drawn together for 2018 FIFA World Cup qualification, in UEFA Group F.

11 November 2016 2018 World Cup qualification	England	3–0	Scotland	London
20:45 (19:45 UTC±0)	Sturridge 23'; Lallana 50'; Cahill 61'	Report		Stadium: Wembley Stadium; Attendance: 87,258; Referee: Cüneyt Çakır (Turkey)

10 June 2017 2018 World Cup qualification	Scotland	2–2	England	Glasgow
17:00	Griffiths 87', 90'	Report	Oxlade-Chamberlain 70'; Kane 90+3'	Stadium: Hampden Park; Attendance: 48,520; Referee: Paolo Tagliavento (Italy)

=== 2020 European Championship ===
The teams met on 18 June 2021 at Wembley in Group D of the UEFA Euro 2020 finals, which had been delayed by the COVID-19 pandemic. The match ended in an uninspiring goalless draw, the first scoreless draw in an England-Scotland match since the 1987 Rous Cup match at Hampden Park.

18 June 2021 Euro 2020 Group D	England	0–0	Scotland	London
21:00 (20:00 UTC+1)		Report		Stadium: Wembley Stadium; Attendance: 20,306; Referee: Antonio Mateu Lahoz (Spain)

=== 150th Anniversary Heritage Match ===
In November 2022, a friendly game was announced for 12 September 2023 to commemorate the 150th anniversary of the first official international fixture between Scotland and England, to take place at Hampden Park. Due to the 2022 FIFA World Cup being played in the winter, the match could not be played during the 2022 November international break as intended, so was instead arranged for the following year 151 years after the first international. The game finished 3–1 to England, with Harry Kane, Jude Bellingham and Phil Foden getting on the scoresheet for England, and Harry Maguire scoring an own goal for Scotland.

12 September 2023 150th Anniversary Heritage Match	Scotland	1–3	England	Glasgow
20:45 (19:45 UTC+1)	Maguire 67' (o.g.)	Report	Foden 32'; Bellingham 35'; Kane 81'	Stadium: Hampden Park; Attendance: 49,129; Referee: Davide Massa (Italy)

== Records ==
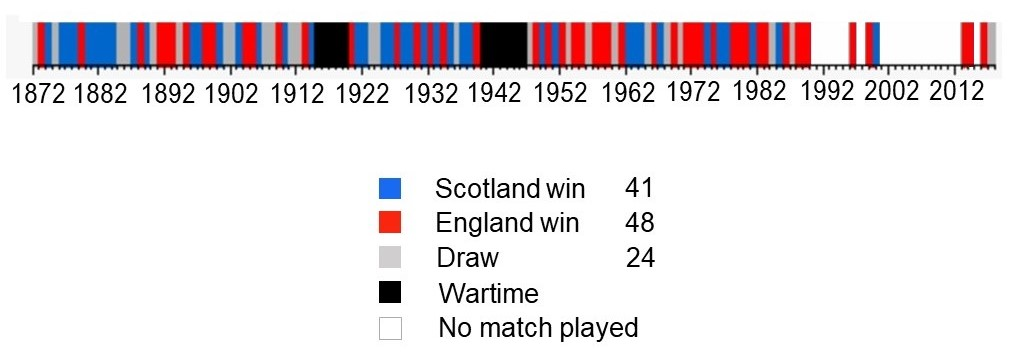
Scotland v England football results 1872-2018

England and Scotland have played each other more than any other nation, playing 116 official matches. England have the better record overall in the fixture, with 49 wins to Scotland's 41. There have been 26 draws, only four of them goalless, with 98 years separating the first and second of those matches. England have scored 206 goals to 175 by Scotland. The record margin of victory in the fixture was England's 9–3 win in 1961, while Scotland's biggest victory was 7–2 in 1878. The record attendance of 149,415, which is also a European record attendance, was set at Hampden Park in 1937.

Scotland long held an advantage in terms of wins, as they recorded ten wins in the first 16 matches. Scotland, the far smaller country in terms of population, were superior during this period because passing football developed earlier there, as shown by the Scotch Professors who moved to play in the nascent English professional league during the late 1880s (although those players themselves were not eligible, as Scotland refused to pick England-based Scots until 1896). Scotland were also dominant in the 1920s and 30s, and prior to the Second World War had 29 wins in the series to England's 19. England reversed the dominance after the war, and Scotland have only won 12 matches since then. The Scots did win three games out of four from 1974 to 1977, but lost every other meeting in the 1970s, and have only won three times (compared to 14 English wins) since 1977. England pulled ahead for the first time in the history of the fixture with their win in 1983.

=== All official matches between England and Scotland ===
Scores and results list Scotland's goal tally first

England Win
Scotland Win
Draw

Date	Venue	Result	Competition	Notes
30 November 1872	Hamilton Crescent, Partick	0–0	Friendly	
8 March 1873	The Oval, London	2–4	Friendly	
7 March 1874	Hamilton Crescent, Partick	2–1	Friendly	
6 March 1875	The Oval, London	2–2	Friendly	
4 March 1876	Hamilton Crescent, Partick	3–0	Friendly	
3 March 1877	The Oval, London	3–1	Friendly	
2 March 1878	Hampden Park (I), Crosshill, Glasgow	7–2	Friendly	
5 April 1879	The Oval, London	4–5	Friendly	
13 March 1880	Hampden Park (I), Crosshill	5–4	Friendly	
12 March 1881	The Oval, London	6–1	Friendly	
11 March 1882	Hampden Park (I), Crosshill	5–1	Friendly	
10 March 1883	Bramall Lane, Sheffield	3–2	Friendly	
15 March 1884	Cathkin Park, Crosshill	1–0	1884 British Home Championship	
21 March 1885	The Oval, London	1–1	1885 British Home Championship	
27 March 1886	Hampden Park (II), Glasgow	1–1	1886 British Home Championship	
19 March 1887	Leamington Road, Blackburn	3–2	1887 British Home Championship	
17 March 1888	Hampden Park (II), Glasgow	0–5	1888 British Home Championship	
13 April 1889	The Oval, London	3–2	1889 British Home Championship	
5 April 1890	Hampden Park (II), Glasgow	1–1	1890 British Home Championship	
4 April 1891	Ewood Park, Blackburn	1–2	1891 British Home Championship	
2 April 1892	Ibrox Park (I), Govan	1–4	1892 British Home Championship	
1 April 1893	Athletic Ground, Richmond	2–5	1893 British Home Championship	
7 April 1894	Celtic Park, Glasgow	2–2	1894 British Home Championship	
6 April 1895	Goodison Park, Liverpool	0–3	1895 British Home Championship	
4 April 1896	Celtic Park, Glasgow	2–1	1896 British Home Championship	
3 April 1897	Crystal Palace National Sports Centre, London	2–1	1897 British Home Championship	
2 April 1898	Celtic Park, Glasgow	1–3	1898 British Home Championship	
8 April 1899	Villa Park, Birmingham	1–2	1899 British Home Championship	
7 April 1900	Celtic Park, Glasgow	4–1	1900 British Home Championship	
30 March 1901	Crystal Palace, London	2–2	1901 British Home Championship	
3 May 1902	Villa Park, Birmingham	2–2	1902 British Home Championship	(Note: This match was a replay of the match originally staged on 5 April 1902 at Ibrox Stadium, which was abandoned after part of the stadium collapsed, killing 25 people. Funds raised by the replayed game contributed towards a disaster fund.)
4 April 1903	Bramall Lane, Sheffield	2–1	1903 British Home Championship	
9 April 1904	Celtic Park, Glasgow	0–1	1904 British Home Championship	
1 April 1905	Crystal Palace, London	0–1	1905 British Home Championship	
7 April 1906	Hampden Park, Glasgow	2–1	1906 British Home Championship	
6 April 1907	St James' Park, Newcastle	1–1	1907 British Home Championship	
4 April 1908	Hampden Park, Glasgow	1–1	1908 British Home Championship	
3 April 1909	Crystal Palace, London	0–2	1909 British Home Championship	
2 April 1910	Hampden Park, Glasgow	2–0	1910 British Home Championship	
1 April 1911	Goodison Park, Liverpool	1–1	1911 British Home Championship	
23 March 1912	Hampden Park, Glasgow	1–1	1912 British Home Championship	
5 April 1913	Stamford Bridge, London	0–1	1913 British Home Championship	
4 April 1914	Hampden Park, Glasgow	3–1	1914 British Home Championship	(Note: The annual match was suspended between 1915 and 1919 because of World War I. Four unofficial wartime internationals were played during the war.)
10 April 1920	Hillsborough Stadium, Sheffield	4–5	1920 British Home Championship	
9 April 1921	Hampden Park, Glasgow	3–0	1921 British Home Championship	
8 April 1922	Villa Park, Birmingham	1–0	1922 British Home Championship	
14 April 1923	Hampden Park, Glasgow	2–2	1923 British Home Championship	
12 April 1924	Wembley Stadium (I), London	1–1	1924 British Home Championship	
4 April 1925	Hampden Park, Glasgow	2–0	1925 British Home Championship	
17 April 1926	Old Trafford, Manchester	1–0	1926 British Home Championship	
2 April 1927	Hampden Park, Glasgow	1–2	1927 British Home Championship	
31 March 1928	Wembley Stadium (I), London	5–1	1928 British Home Championship	
13 April 1929	Hampden Park, Glasgow	1–0	1929 British Home Championship	
5 April 1930	Wembley Stadium (I), London	2–5	1930 British Home Championship	
28 March 1931	Hampden Park, Glasgow	2–0	1931 British Home Championship	
9 April 1932	Wembley Stadium (I), London	0–3	1932 British Home Championship	
1 April 1933	Hampden Park, Glasgow	2–1	1933 British Home Championship	
14 April 1934	Wembley Stadium (I), London	0–3	1934 British Home Championship	
6 April 1935	Hampden Park, Glasgow	2–0	1935 British Home Championship	(Note: Two unofficial internationals were played in May and August 1935 for the King's Silver Jubilee Trust Fund.)
4 April 1936	Wembley Stadium (I), London	1–1	1936 British Home Championship	
17 April 1937	Hampden Park, Glasgow	3–1	1937 British Home Championship	
9 April 1938	Wembley Stadium (I), London	1–0	1938 British Home Championship	
15 April 1939	Hampden Park, Glasgow	1–2	1939 British Home Championship	(Note: The annual match was suspended between 1940 and 1946 because of World War II. 16 unofficial wartime internationals were played during the period, followed by an unofficial international in 1946 as a fundraiser for the Burnden Park disaster.)
12 April 1947	Wembley Stadium (I), London	1–1	1947 British Home Championship	
10 April 1948	Hampden Park, Glasgow	0–2	1948 British Home Championship	
9 April 1949	Wembley Stadium (I), London	3–1	1949 British Home Championship	
15 April 1950	Hampden Park, Glasgow	0–1	1950 British Home Championship	(Note: The match also acted as a qualification match for the 1950 FIFA World Cup.)
14 April 1951	Wembley Stadium (I), London	3–2	1951 British Home Championship	
5 April 1952	Hampden Park, Glasgow	1–2	1952 British Home Championship	
18 April 1953	Wembley Stadium (I), London	2–2	1953 British Home Championship	
3 April 1954	Hampden Park, Glasgow	2–4	1954 British Home Championship	(Note: The match also acted as a qualification match for the 1954 FIFA World Cup.)
2 April 1955	Wembley Stadium (I), London	2–7	1955 British Home Championship	(Note: Four goals by Dennis Wilshaw is the highest total in a match by a player for either team.)
14 April 1956	Hampden Park, Glasgow	1–1	1956 British Home Championship	
6 April 1957	Wembley Stadium (I), London	1–2	1957 British Home Championship	
19 April 1958	Hampden Park, Glasgow	0–4	1958 British Home Championship	
11 April 1959	Wembley Stadium (I), London	0–1	1959 British Home Championship	
9 April 1960	Hampden Park, Glasgow	1–1	1960 British Home Championship	
15 April 1961	Wembley Stadium (I), London	3–9	1961 British Home Championship	
14 April 1962	Hampden Park, Glasgow	2–0	1962 British Home Championship	
6 April 1963	Wembley Stadium (I), London	2–1	1963 British Home Championship	
11 April 1964	Hampden Park, Glasgow	1–0	1964 British Home Championship	
10 April 1965	Wembley Stadium (I), London	2–2	1965 British Home Championship	
2 April 1966	Hampden Park, Glasgow	3–4	1966 British Home Championship	
15 April 1967	Wembley Stadium (I), London	3–2	1967 British Home Championship	(Note: This match also acted as a qualification match for UEFA Euro 1968.)
24 February 1968	Hampden Park, Glasgow	1–1	1968 British Home Championship	
10 May 1969	Wembley Stadium (I), London	1–4	1969 British Home Championship	
25 April 1970	Hampden Park, Glasgow	0–0	1970 British Home Championship	(Note: The first goalless draw since the first ever fixture, 98 years earlier.)
22 May 1971	Wembley Stadium (I), London	1–3	1971 British Home Championship	
27 May 1972	Hampden Park, Glasgow	0–1	1972 British Home Championship	
14 February 1973	Hampden Park, Glasgow	0–5	Friendly	(Note: A friendly match arranged to mark the centenary of the Scottish Football Association.)
19 May 1973	Wembley Stadium (I), London	0–1	1973 British Home Championship	
18 May 1974	Hampden Park, Glasgow	2–0	1974 British Home Championship	
24 May 1975	Wembley Stadium (I), London	1–5	1975 British Home Championship	
15 May 1976	Hampden Park, Glasgow	2–1	1976 British Home Championship	
4 June 1977	Wembley Stadium (I), London	2–1	1977 British Home Championship	
20 May 1978	Hampden Park, Glasgow	0–1	1978 British Home Championship	
26 May 1979	Wembley Stadium (I), London	1–3	1979 British Home Championship	
24 May 1980	Hampden Park, Glasgow	0–2	1980 British Home Championship	
23 May 1981	Wembley Stadium (I), London	1–0	1981 British Home Championship	
29 May 1982	Hampden Park, Glasgow	0–1	1982 British Home Championship	
1 June 1983	Wembley Stadium (I), London	0–2	1983 British Home Championship	
26 May 1984	Hampden Park, Glasgow	1–1	1984 British Home Championship	
25 May 1985	Hampden Park, Glasgow	1–0	1985 Rous Cup	
23 April 1986	Wembley Stadium (I), London	1–2	1986 Rous Cup	
23 May 1987	Hampden Park, Glasgow	0–0	1987 Rous Cup	
21 May 1988	Wembley Stadium (I), London	0–1	1988 Rous Cup	
27 May 1989	Hampden Park, Glasgow	0–2	1989 Rous Cup	
15 June 1996	Wembley Stadium (I), London	0–2	UEFA Euro 1996 Group A	
13 November 1999	Hampden Park, Glasgow	0–2	UEFA Euro 2000 qualifying play-offs	(Note: England won 2–1 on aggregate and qualified for Euro 2000.)
17 November 1999	Wembley Stadium (I), London	1–0	UEFA Euro 2000 qualifying play-offs	
14 August 2013	Wembley Stadium, London	2–3	Friendly	(Note: A friendly match arranged to mark the 150th anniversary of The Football Association.)
18 November 2014	Celtic Park, Glasgow	1–3	Friendly	
11 November 2016	Wembley Stadium, London	0–3	2018 FIFA World Cup qualification – UEFA Group F	
10 June 2017	Hampden Park, Glasgow	2–2	2018 FIFA World Cup qualification – UEFA Group F	
18 June 2021	Wembley Stadium, London	0–0	UEFA Euro 2020 Group D	
12 September 2023	Hampden Park, Glasgow	1–3	Friendly	(Note: A friendly match arranged to mark the 150th anniversary of the first international fixture.)

== Club level ==
As well as the rivalry between the national sides, English and Scottish club teams have also met on numerous occasions in the various European club competitions. These matches are frequently described by the media as being a "Battle of Britain", irrespective of the clubs involved. Matches between English and Scottish club sides in the late 19th century were big events, such as the meeting in 1895 of English league champions Sunderland and Scottish league champions Heart of Midlothian in a game grandly described as the Championship of the World. The most important club meeting was when Celtic and Leeds United met in the semi-final of the 1969–70 European Cup, which was the first contest to be popularly described as a "Battle of Britain". Celtic won the first leg at Elland Road 1–0, and the second leg was played at Hampden Park to allow a bigger crowd to attend than could be held at Celtic Park. Billy Bremner opened the scoring early on to level the aggregate score, but Celtic came back to win the match 2–1 and the tie 3–1.

Rangers defeated Leeds United home and away to qualify for the first Champions League group stage in 1992–93. Celtic lost on the away goals rule to Liverpool in the 1997–98 UEFA Cup, but they beat Blackburn Rovers and Liverpool on their run to the 2003 UEFA Cup Final. Celtic and Manchester United were drawn together twice in the Champions League group phase in quick succession, in 2006–07 and 2008–09, while Arsenal beat Celtic 5–1 on aggregate in the 2009–10 qualifiers.

Until 2007, the Scottish clubs held their own in meetings with English clubs, winning 13 and losing 12 of the 37 matches. Since 2007, the English clubs have been unbeaten in these fixtures. After a goalless draw between Manchester United and Rangers in the 2010–11 Champions League, The Daily Telegraph reporter Roddy Forsyth commented that the growing financial disparity between the two leagues was reflected in a below capacity attendance at Old Trafford, the defensive tactics used by Rangers, and the weakened team selection by United. Hearts suffered a record defeat against Tottenham in the 2011–12 UEFA Europa League, but performed more creditably against Liverpool in 2012–13. The most recent competitive meeting of clubs from the two countries was between Rangers and Manchester United in the 2024–25 UEFA Europa League league phase.

There have also been a number of other competitions between English and Scottish clubs. Before European competition started in 1955, the Coronation Cup was staged in 1953, to mark the coronation of Queen Elizabeth II. Four prominent clubs from each country participated in a knockout tournament, with Celtic and Hibernian defeating two English clubs each to reach the final, which Celtic won 2–0 at Hampden. A similar competition called the Empire Exhibition Trophy was staged in 1938, with Celtic defeating Everton 1–0 in the final at Ibrox. Back in 1902, the four-team British League Cup was staged, with both Rangers and Celtic defeating their English opponents to set up a final between them (this was before the Old Firm term came into use).

In the 1970s, American oil giant Texaco sponsored the Texaco Cup, which was a knockout competition for clubs that had failed to qualify for the main European competitions. Interest in the competition soon waned, however, and Texaco withdrew their sponsorship after the 1974–75 season. The competition continued for a few years in the form of the Anglo-Scottish Cup, but it was discontinued in 1981.

== Players and managers ==
The rivalry between the two nations has not prevented their respective nationals from playing in each other's domestic leagues, in certain cases to high renown. Historically, the trend has been for Scottish players to play in the richer English league, although many English players have also played in Scotland.

Many great English sides have been built around Scottish players. The double-winning Spurs team of 1961 included Bill Brown, Dave Mackay and John White. Denis Law is the second greatest goalscorer in the history of Manchester United. The great Liverpool teams of the 1970s and 1980s were built around Kenny Dalglish, Graeme Souness and Alan Hansen, while Nottingham Forest's double European Cup-winning side included Archie Gemmill, John McGovern, John Robertson, and FWA Footballer of the Year Kenny Burns. The great Leeds United side of the 1960s and 1970s included several great Scottish players such as Billy Bremner, Peter Lorimer and Eddie Gray. Manchester United and Liverpool became the most successful clubs in English football, largely due to the efforts of Scottish managers Matt Busby and Bill Shankly, respectively.

By the late 2000s, the flow of Scottish players to major English clubs had dried up, due to the Scotland team being less competitive at international level and the English Premier League attracting stars from all over the world, rather than just from the British Isles. This trend has been somewhat reversed more recently, with the Scottish national side managed by Steve Clarke featuring few home-based players and several playing in the upper levels of English football, namely Andy Robertson, John McGinn and Billy Gilmour.

There have been fewer notable English players who have played in Scotland. Joe Baker was the first player to play for England without having played in the Football League, but his was an isolated example because he played at a time when a player was only allowed to play for the country of his birth. Those rules were subsequently relaxed and the sons or even grandsons of Scots are now allowed to play for Scotland. This means that some footballers born in England have played in and for Scotland, including Andy Goram and Stuart McCall.

There was a temporary influx of English players to the Scottish league during the late 1980s, while English clubs were banned from European competition due to the Heysel disaster. Prominent England players including Terry Butcher, Trevor Steven, Gary Stevens, Chris Woods and Mark Hateley all moved to Rangers. During this time, Rangers had a higher turnover than Manchester United and could therefore offer wages that could compare with even the biggest English clubs. Since the inception of the Premier League, however, the English clubs have become wealthier than Rangers and Celtic. No prominent England player has played in Scotland in recent years, although Chris Sutton and Alan Thompson played a significant part in Celtic's run to the 2003 UEFA Cup Final. The most recent player to be capped by England while playing in Scotland was Celtic goalkeeper Fraser Forster.

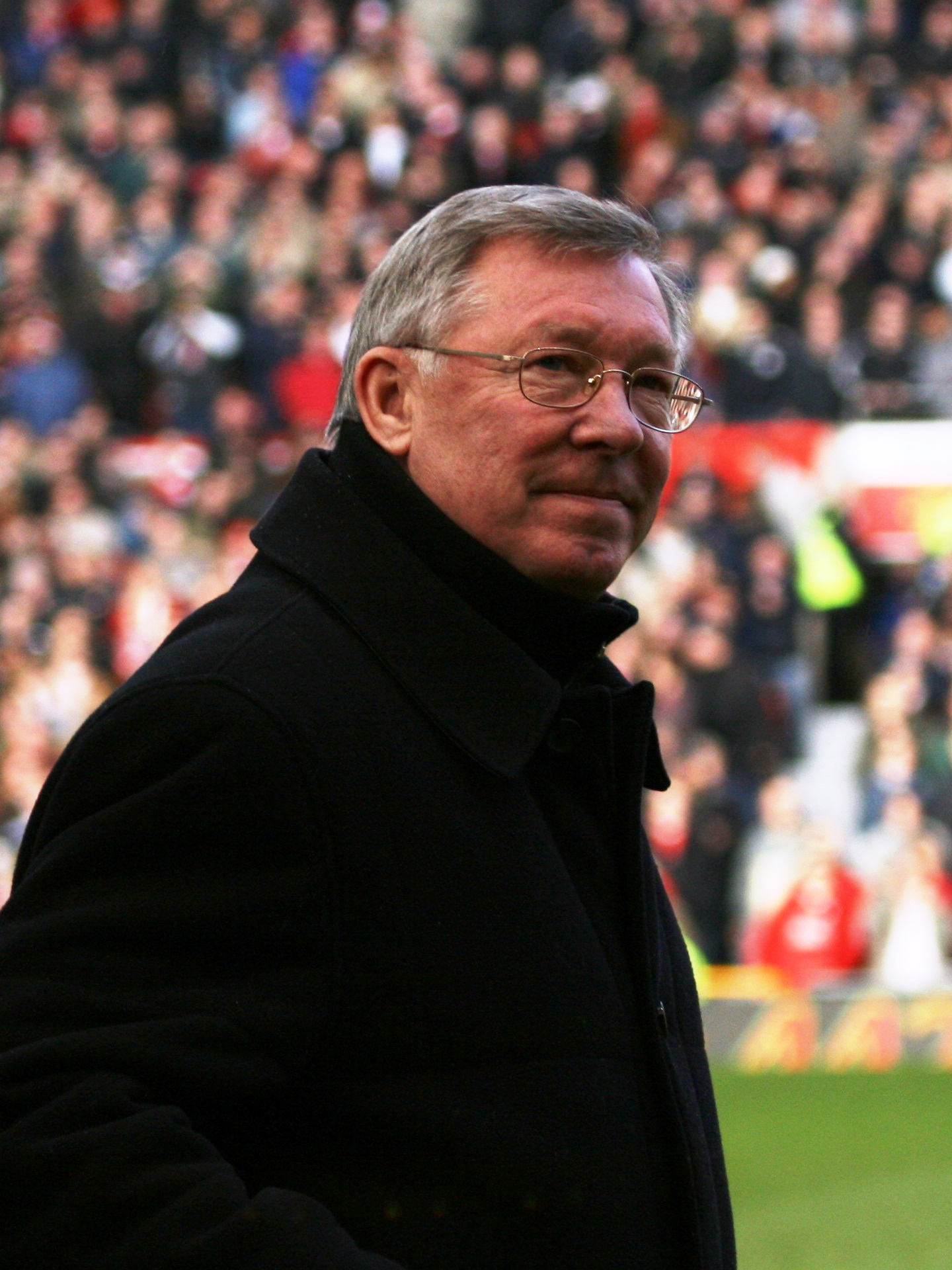
Sir Alex Ferguson, manager of Manchester United from 1986 until 2013

Scottish managers, including Bill Shankly and Matt Busby, have enjoyed great success in England football. Alex Ferguson dominated the Premier League with Manchester United until his retirement in 2013. Ferguson claimed in 2010 that he had turned down approaches by the FA to manage England, partly because it would have been a "tremendous handicap" for any Scot to manage England. English managers have also worked at Scottish clubs, with John Barnes and Tony Mowbray managing Celtic for short periods, and Steven Gerrard and Michael Beale at Rangers.

== Supporters ==
The rivalry also manifests itself in the fact that many Scottish people support England's opponents and vice versa, as when English journalist Rod Liddle announced, "I already have my Ukraine flag ready for Scotland's next fixture", despite the fact that England and Scotland are both countries of the United Kingdom. Whether Scots should support England against other national teams is routinely a matter of heated debate. Some Scotland fans sing, "Stand up if you hate England" and, "If you hate the fucking English, clap your hands", while some English fans reciprocate these sentiments with, "Stand up if you hate Scotland", or "Scotland get battered, everywhere they go". However, the phenomenon of Scots wishing England well in international tournaments is not unknown, with a survey on the eve of the 2002 World Cup finding that one Scot in three intended to support England, while only one in six intended to support England's opponents. A survey before the 2010 World Cup found a more even divide, with 24% on each side. The largest group in both surveys did not offer an opinion either way.

Scotland fans booed "God Save the King" during the 150th anniversary game on 12 September 2023. The rivalry has long been tied up with questions of Scottish national identity and political sentiment towards England.

== See also ==
- List of sports rivalries in the United Kingdom
- Argentina–England football rivalry
- England–Germany football rivalry
- Scotland players born in England
- Calcutta Cup in rugby
