= 1960–61 in Scottish football =

Scottish football season

Division One champions
- Rangers

Division Two champions
- Stirling Albion

Scottish Cup winners
- Dunfermline Athletic

League Cup winners
- Rangers

Junior Cup winners
- Dunbar United

Teams in Europe
- Heart of Midlothian, Hibernian, Rangers

Scotland national team
- 1961 BHC, 1962 World Cup qualification

The 1960–61 season was the 88th season of competitive football in Scotland and the 64th season of the Scottish Football League.

== Scottish League Division One ==
Pos	Team	Pld	W	D	L	GF	GA	GR	Pts	Qualification or relegation
1	Rangers (C)	34	23	5	6	88	46	1.913	51	Qualified for the European Cup
2	Kilmarnock	34	21	8	5	77	45	1.711	50	
3	Third Lanark	34	20	2	12	100	80	1.250	42	
4	Celtic	34	15	9	10	64	46	1.391	39	
5	Motherwell	34	15	8	11	70	57	1.228	38	
6	Aberdeen	34	14	8	12	72	72	1.000	36	
7	Hearts	34	13	8	13	51	53	0.962	34	Invited for the Inter-Cities Fairs Cup
8	Hibernian	34	15	4	15	66	69	0.957	34	Invited for the Inter-Cities Fairs Cup
9	Dundee United	34	13	7	14	60	58	1.034	33	
10	Dundee	34	13	6	15	61	53	1.151	32	
11	Partick Thistle	34	13	6	15	59	69	0.855	32	
12	Dunfermline Athletic	34	12	7	15	65	81	0.802	31	Qualified for the Cup Winners' Cup
13	Airdrieonians	34	10	10	14	61	71	0.859	30	
14	St Mirren	34	11	7	16	53	58	0.914	29	
15	St Johnstone	34	10	9	15	47	63	0.746	29	
16	Raith Rovers	34	10	7	17	46	67	0.687	27	
17	Clyde (R)	34	6	11	17	55	77	0.714	23	Relegated to the Second Division
18	Ayr United (R)	34	5	12	17	51	81	0.630	22	Relegated to the Second Division

Source: RSSSF
(C) Champions; (R) Relegated

Champions: Rangers
Relegated: Clyde, Ayr United

== Scottish League Division Two ==
Pos	Team	Pld	W	D	L	GF	GA	GD	Pts	Promotion or relegation
1	Stirling Albion	36	24	7	5	89	37	+52	55	Promotion to the 1961–62 First Division
2	Falkirk	36	24	6	6	100	40	+60	54	Promotion to the 1961–62 First Division
3	Stenhousemuir	36	24	2	10	99	69	+30	50	
4	Stranraer	36	19	6	11	83	55	+28	44	
5	Queen of the South	36	20	3	13	77	52	+25	43	
6	Hamilton Academical	36	17	7	12	84	80	+4	41	
7	Montrose	36	19	2	15	75	65	+10	40	
8	Cowdenbeath	36	17	6	13	71	65	+6	40	
9	Berwick Rangers	36	14	9	13	62	69	−7	37	
10	Dumbarton	36	15	5	16	78	82	−4	35	
11	Alloa Athletic	36	13	7	16	78	68	+10	33	
12	Arbroath	36	13	7	16	56	76	−20	33	
13	East Fife	36	14	4	18	70	80	−10	32	
14	Brechin City	36	9	9	18	60	78	−18	27	
15	Queen's Park	36	10	6	20	61	87	−26	26	
16	East Stirlingshire	36	9	7	20	59	100	−41	25	
17	Albion Rovers	36	9	6	21	60	89	−29	24	
18	Forfar Athletic	36	10	4	22	65	98	−33	24	
19	Morton	36	5	11	20	56	93	−37	21	

Source: "1960-1961 Second Division - SPFL Archive". SPFL.

Promoted: Stirling Albion, Falkirk

== Cup honours ==
Competition	Winner	Score	Runner-up
Scottish Cup 1960–61	Dunfermline Athletic	2 – 0 (rep.)	Celtic
League Cup 1960–61	Rangers	2 – 0	Kilmarnock
Junior Cup	Dunbar United	2 – 0 (rep.)	Cambuslang Rangers

== Other honours ==
=== National ===
Competition	Winner	Score	Runner-up
Scottish Qualifying Cup – North	Inverness Caledonian	3 – 2 *	Peterhead
Scottish Qualifying Cup – South	Gala Fairydean	4 – 3 *	Vale of Leithen

=== County ===
Competition	Winner	Score	Runner-up
Aberdeenshire Cup	Huntly		
Ayrshire Cup	Ayr United	3 – 0	Kilmarnock
East of Scotland Shield	Hibernian	4 – 2	Hearts
Fife Cup	Dunfermline Athletic	5 – 3 *	Raith Rovers
Forfarshire Cup	Dundee United	6 – 3	Montrose
Glasgow Cup	Partick Thistle	2 – 0	Celtic
Lanarkshire Cup	Airdrie	3 – 2	Motherwell
Renfrewshire Cup	St Mirren	2 – 1	Morton
Stirlingshire Cup	Falkirk	4 – 3 *	Alloa Athletic

^{*} – aggregate over two legs

=== Highland League ===
Top Three
Pos	Team	Pld	W	D	L	GF	GA	GD	Pts
1	Elgin City	28	19	6	3	85	39	+46	44
2	Keith	28	19	6	3	75	47	+28	44
3	Buckie Thistle	28	17	4	7	78	46	+32	38

== Scotland national team ==
Date	Venue	Opponents	Score	Competition	Scotland scorer(s)
22 October 1960	Ninian Park, Cardiff (A)	Wales	0–2	BHC	
9 November 1960	Hampden Park, Glasgow (H)	Northern Ireland	5–2	BHC	Ralph Brand, Denis Law, Eric Caldow (pen.), Alex Young
15 April 1961	Wembley Stadium, London (A)	England	3–9	BHC	Davie Wilson (2), Dave Mackay
3 May 1961	Hampden Park, Glasgow (H)	Republic of Ireland	4–1	WCQG8	Ralph Brand (2), David Herd (2)
7 May 1961	Dalymount Park, Dublin (A)	Republic of Ireland	3–0	WCQG8	Alex Young (2), Ralph Brand
14 May 1961	Tehelné Pole Stadium, Bratislava (A)	Czechoslovakia	0–4	WCQG8	

1961 British Home Championship – Third Place

Key:

- (H) = Home match
- (A) = Away match
- WCQG8 = World Cup qualifying – Group 8
- BHC = British Home Championship
