= 1962–63 in Scottish football =

Division One champions
- Rangers

Division Two champions
- St Johnstone

Scottish Cup winners
- Rangers

League Cup winners
- Heart of Midlothian

Junior Cup winners
- Irvine Meadow XI

Teams in Europe
- Celtic, Dundee, Dunfermline Athletic, Hibernian, Rangers

Scotland national team
- 1963 BHC

The 1962–63 season was the 90th season of competitive football in Scotland and the 66th season of the Scottish Football League.

== Scottish League Division One ==
Pos	Team	Pld	W	D	L	GF	GA	GR	Pts	Qualification or relegation
1	Rangers (C)	34	25	7	2	94	28	3.357	57	Qualified for the European Cup
2	Kilmarnock	34	20	8	6	92	40	2.300	48	
3	Partick Thistle	34	20	6	8	66	44	1.500	46	Invited for the Inter-Cities Fairs Cup
4	Celtic	34	19	6	9	76	44	1.727	44	Qualified for the Cup Winners' Cup
5	Hearts	34	17	9	8	85	59	1.441	43	Invited for the Inter-Cities Fairs Cup
6	Aberdeen	34	17	7	10	70	47	1.489	41	
7	Dundee United	34	15	11	8	67	52	1.288	41	
8	Dunfermline	34	13	8	13	50	47	1.064	34	
9	Dundee	34	12	9	13	60	49	1.224	33	
10	Motherwell	34	10	11	13	60	63	0.952	31	
11	Airdrieonians	34	14	2	18	52	76	0.684	30	
12	St Mirren	34	10	8	16	52	72	0.722	28	
13	Falkirk	34	12	3	19	54	69	0.783	27	
14	Third Lanark	34	9	8	17	56	68	0.824	26	
15	Queen of the South	34	10	6	18	36	75	0.480	26	
16	Hibernian	34	8	9	17	47	67	0.701	25	
17	Clyde (R)	34	9	5	20	49	83	0.590	23	Relegated to the Second Division
18	Raith Rovers (R)	34	2	5	27	35	118	0.297	9	Relegated to the Second Division

Source: RSSSF
(C) Champions; (R) Relegated

Champions: Rangers
Relegated: Clyde, Raith Rovers

== Scottish League Division Two ==
Pos	Team	Pld	W	D	L	GF	GA	GR	Pts	Promotion or relegation
1	St Johnstone (C, P)	36	25	5	6	83	37	2.243	55	Promotion to 1963–64 Scottish First Division
2	East Stirlingshire (P)	36	20	9	7	80	50	1.600	49	Promotion to 1963–64 Scottish First Division
3	Morton	36	23	2	11	100	49	2.041	48	
4	Hamilton Academical	36	18	8	10	69	56	1.232	44	
5	Stranraer	36	16	10	10	81	70	1.157	42	
6	Arbroath	36	18	4	14	74	51	1.451	40	
7	Albion Rovers	36	18	2	16	72	79	0.911	38	
8	Cowdenbeath	36	15	7	14	72	61	1.180	37	
9	Alloa Athletic	36	15	6	15	57	56	1.018	36	
10	Stirling Albion	36	16	4	16	74	75	0.987	36	
11	East Fife	36	15	6	15	60	69	0.870	36	
12	Dumbarton	36	15	4	17	64	64	1.000	34	
13	Ayr United	36	13	8	15	68	77	0.883	34	
14	Queen's Park	36	13	6	17	66	72	0.917	32	
15	Montrose	36	13	5	18	57	70	0.814	31	
16	Stenhousemuir	36	13	5	18	54	75	0.720	31	
17	Berwick Rangers	36	11	7	18	57	77	0.740	29	
18	Forfar Athletic	36	9	5	22	73	99	0.737	23	
19	Brechin City	36	3	3	30	39	113	0.345	9	

Source: statto.com
Rules for classification: 1) points; 2) goal ratio.
(C) Champions; (P) Promoted

Promoted: St Johnstone, East Stirlingshire

== Cups ==
Competition	Winner	Score	Runner-up
Scottish Cup 1962–63	Rangers	3 – 0 (rep.)	Celtic
League Cup 1962–63	Heart of Midlothian	1 – 0	Kilmarnock
Junior Cup	Irvine Meadow XI	2 – 1	Glenafton Athletic

== Other honours ==
=== National ===
Competition	Winner	Score	Runner-up
Scottish Qualifying Cup - North	Forres Mechanics	8 – 4 *	Buckie Thistle
Scottish Qualifying Cup - South	Duns	7 – 1 *	St Cuthbert Wanderers

=== County ===
Competition	Winner	Score	Runner-up
Aberdeenshire Cup	Peterhead		
East of Scotland Shield	Hibernian	2 – 0	Hearts
Fife Cup	Dunfermline Athletic	4 – 0	East Fife
Forfarshire Cup	Dundee United	2 – 1	Arbroath
Glasgow Cup	Third Lanark	2 – 1	Celtic
Lanarkshire Cup	Airdrie	3 – 0	Motherwell
Renfrewshire Cup	St Mirren	2 – 1 *	Morton
Stirlingshire Cup	Stenhousemuir	4 – 1	Falkirk

^{*} - aggregate over two legs

=== Highland League ===
Top Three
Pos	Team	Pld	W	D	L	GF	GA	GD	Pts
1	Elgin City	28	22	1	5	105	47	+58	45
2	Inverness Caledonian	28	19	4	5	56	48	+8	42
3	Clachnacuddin	28	14	4	10	65	45	+20	32

== National team ==
Date	Venue	Opponents	Score	Competition	Scotland scorer(s)
20 October 1962	Ninian Park, Cardiff (A)	Wales	3–2	BHC	Eric Caldow (pen.), Denis Law, Willie Henderson
7 November 1962	Hampden Park, Glasgow (H)	Northern Ireland	5–1	BHC	Denis Law (4), Willie Henderson
6 April 1963	Wembley Stadium, London (A)	England	2–1	BHC	Jim Baxter (2, 1 pen.)
8 May 1963	Hampden Park, Glasgow (H)	Austria	4–1	Friendly	Denis Law (2), Davie Wilson (2)
4 June 1963	Brann Stadium, Bergen (A)	Norway	3–4	Friendly	Denis Law (3)
9 June 1963	Dalymount Park, Dublin (A)	Republic of Ireland	0–1	Friendly	
13 June 1963	Bernabeu Stadium, Madrid (A)	Spain	6–2	Friendly	Denis Law, Dave Gibson, Frank McLintock, Davie Wilson, Willie Henderson, Ian St. John

- Scotland won the 1963 British Home Championship.

Key:

- (H) = Home match
- (A) = Away match
- BHC = British Home Championship
