= 1978 FIFA World Cup qualification – UEFA Group 2 =

Group 2 consisted of four of the 32 teams entered into the European zone: England, Finland, Italy, and Luxembourg. These four teams competed on a home-and-away basis for one of the 8.5 spots in the final tournament allocated to the European zone, with the group's winner claiming the spot.

== Standings ==
Pos	Team	Pld	W	D	L	GF	GA	GD	Pts
1	Italy	6	5	0	1	18	4	+14	10
2	England	6	5	0	1	15	4	+11	10
3	Finland	6	2	0	4	11	16	−5	4
4	Luxembourg	6	0	0	6	2	22	−20	0

== Matches ==
13 June 1976

Finland	1 – 4	England
Paatelainen 27'	Report	Pearson 14'; Keegan 30', 60'; Channon 56'

Helsinki Olympic Stadium, Helsinki, Finland
Attendance: 24,000
Referee: Alfred Delcourt (Belgium)

22 September 1976

Finland	7 – 1	Luxembourg
A. Heiskanen 15'; E. Heiskanen 22', 27'; Rissanen 51', 61'; Heikkinen 54'; Mäkynen 82' (pen.)	Report	G. Zender 52'

Referee: Thime (Norway)

13 October 1976

England	2 – 1	Finland
Tueart 4'; Royle 51'	Report	Nieminen 48'

Referee: Eriksson (Sweden)

16 October 1976

Luxembourg	1 – 4	Italy
Braun 86'	Report	Graziani 24'; Bettega 44', 81'; Antognoni 50'

Referee: Dörflinger (Switzerland)

17 November 1976

Italy	2 – 0	England
Antognoni 36'; Bettega 77'	Report

Referee: Klein (Israel)

30 March 1977

England	5 – 0	Luxembourg
Keegan 9'; T. Francis 58'; Kennedy 65'; Channon 68', 79' (pen.)	Report

Referee: Bonett (Malta)

26 May 1977

Luxembourg	0 – 1	Finland
	Report	A. Heiskanen 57'

Referee: Amundsen (Denmark)

8 June 1977

Finland	0 – 3	Italy
	Report	Gentile 8'; Bettega 56'; Benetti 81'

Referee: Helies (France)

12 October 1977

Luxembourg	0 – 2	England
	Report	Kennedy 31'; Mariner 90'

Referee: Jarguz (Poland)

15 October 1977

Italy	6 – 1	Finland
Bettega 29', 38', 59', 62'; Graziani 45'; Zaccarelli 71'	Report	Haaskivi 67'

Referee: Dudin (Bulgaria)

16 November 1977

England	2 – 0	Italy
Keegan 11'; Brooking 80'	Report

Referee: Palotai (Hungary)

3 December 1977

Italy	3 – 0	Luxembourg
Bettega 4'; Graziani 11'; Causio 56'	Report

Referee: Maksimović (Yugoslavia)
