= 1974 FIFA World Cup qualification – UEFA Group 5 =

Group 5 consisted of three of the 32 teams entered into the European zone: England, Poland, and Wales. These three teams competed on a home-and-away basis for one of the 9.5 spots in the final tournament allocated to the European zone, with the group's winner claiming the place in the finals.

This was the first time England failed to qualify for the World Cup since first entering in 1950.

== Standings ==
Rank	Team	Pld	W	D	L	GF	GA	GD	Pts
1	Poland	4	2	1	1	6	3	+3	5
2	England	4	1	2	1	3	4	−1	4
3	Wales	4	1	1	2	3	5	−2	3

== Matches ==
15 November 1972

Wales	0–1	England
	Report	Bell 35'

Cardiff, Wales
Referee: Mullan (Scotland)

24 January 1973

England	1–1	Wales
Hunter 41'	Report	Toshack 23'

London, England
Referee: Wright (Northern Ireland)

28 March 1973

Wales	2–0	Poland
James 46'; Hockey 85'	Report

Cardiff, Wales
Referee: Sureda (Spain)

6 June 1973

Poland	2–0	England
Gadocha 7'; Lubański 47'	report

Chorzów, Poland
Referee: Schiller (Austria)

26 September 1973

Poland	3–0	Wales
Gadocha 29'; Lato 34'; Domarski 53'	Report

Chorzów, Poland
Referee: Dahlberg (Sweden)

17 October 1973

England	1–1	Poland
Clarke 63' (pen.)		Domarski 57'

London, England
Referee: Loraux (Belgium)
