= 1970–71 British Home Championship =

Tournament details
- Dates: 15–22 May 1971
- Teams: 4

Final positions
- Champions: England (46th title)
- Runners-up: Ireland

Tournament statistics
- Matches played: 6
- Goals scored: 7 (1.17 per match)
- Top scorer: (England) Martin Chivers (2)

The 1970–71 British Home Championship was an international football competition between the British Home Nations. The tournament was low-scoring affair, reflecting trends in world football at the time, which relied on heavy defense. England won the tournament in their final match by beating Scotland following an earlier victory over Ireland and a draw with the Welsh. The England versus Scotland match saw more goals than the rest of the tournament put together, but Ireland did manage to gain a rare second-place position with 1–0 wins over disappointing Welsh and Scottish sides, whose own match for last place was a goalless draw.

== Table ==
Team	Pld	W	D	L	GF	GA	GD	Pts
England (C)	3	2	1	0	4	1	+3	5
Ireland	3	2	0	1	2	1	+1	4
Wales	3	0	2	1	0	1	−1	2
Scotland	3	0	1	2	1	4	−3	1

Rules for classification: 1) points. The points system worked as follows: 2 points for a win and 1 point for a draw.
(C) Champions

== Results ==
15 May 1971

Ireland	0–1	England
		Clarke 80'

Windsor Park, Belfast
Attendance: 30,000
Referee: Alistair MacKenzie (Scotland)

15 May 1971

Wales	0–0	Scotland

Ninian Park, Cardiff
Attendance: 19,068
Referee: Jack Taylor (England)

18 May 1971

Scotland	0–1	Ireland
		Greig 14' (o.g.)

Hampden Park, Glasgow
Attendance: 31,643
Referee: Clive Thomas (Wales)

19 May 1971

England	0–0	Wales

Wembley Stadium, London
Attendance: 70,000
Referee: Malcolm Wright (Northern Ireland)

22 May 1971

Ireland	1–0	Wales
Hamilton 27'

Windsor Park, Belfast
Attendance: 23,000
Referee: Ken Burns (England)

22 May 1971

England	3–1	Scotland
Peters 9'; Chivers 30', 40'		Curran 11'

Wembley Stadium, London
Attendance: 91,469
Referee: Jef Dorpmans (Netherlands)
