= 1962–63 British Home Championship =

Tournament details
- Host country: England, Ireland, Scotland and Wales
- Dates: 20 October 1962 – 6 April 1963
- Teams: 4

Final positions
- Champions: Scotland
- Runners-up: England

Tournament statistics
- Matches played: 6
- Goals scored: 27 (4.5 per match)
- Top scorer: (Scotland) Denis Law (5)

The 1962–63 British Home Championship football tournament came after disappointment for the home nations in the 1962 FIFA World Cup, for which only England qualified, only to be beaten 3–1 in the quarter-finals by eventual winners Brazil. The Home Championship was won by a Scottish team which dominated all their matches and whitewashed their opponents for a consecutive season as part of a period of temporary but pronounced dominance.

The Scots and English both started strongly, beating Wales and Ireland away respectively. This was followed with similar victories at home in the second fixture, England comprehensively outplaying Wales in a 4–0 win, whilst a Denis Law inspired Scotland hammered the Irish 5–1 with Law scoring four times. In the final games, Wales gained some points by beating Ireland, but the deciding match of the tournament was closely fought between England and Scotland at Wembley Stadium, from which Scotland emerged eventual 2–1 winners to claim the championship.

== Table ==
Team	Pld	W	D	L	GF	GA	GD	Pts
Scotland (C)	3	3	0	0	10	4	+6	6
England	3	2	0	1	8	3	+5	4
Wales	3	1	0	2	6	8	−2	2
Ireland	3	0	0	3	3	12	−9	0

Rules for classification: 1) points. The points system worked as follows: 2 points for a win and 1 point for a draw.
(C) Champions

== Results ==
20 October 1962

Ireland	1–3	England
Barr		O'Grady; Greaves

Windsor Park, Belfast

20 October 1962

Wales	2–3	Scotland
Allchurch; Charles		Caldow; Law; Henderson

Ninian Park, Cardiff

7 November 1962

Scotland	5–1	Ireland
Law; Henderson		Bingham

Hampden Park, Glasgow

21 November 1962

England	4–0	Wales
Peacock; Greaves; Connelly

Wembley Stadium, London

3 April 1963

Ireland	1–4	Wales
Harvey		C. Jones; Woosnam

Windsor Park, Belfast

6 April 1963

England	1–2	Scotland
Douglas		Baxter

Wembley Stadium, London
