= 1977–78 British Home Championship =

Tournament details
- Dates: 13–20 May 1978
- Teams: 4

Final positions
- Champions: England (51st title)
- Runners-up: Wales

Tournament statistics
- Matches played: 6
- Goals scored: 11 (1.83 per match)
- Top scorer: (Scotland) Derek Johnstone (2)

The 1977–78 British Home Championship football competition between the British Home Nations was won by an England side smarting from their failure to qualify for the 1978 FIFA World Cup. Scotland again refused to travel to Northern Ireland and therefore gained an additional home match. The Scots, who had qualified for the World Cup and of whom much was expected following impressive form and a strong team in the months going into the finals performed particularly poorly in the Home Championship, foreshadowing their performance in Argentina a few months later. The English capitalised on victory over the Welsh in their first match and then won in their next two beating an already demoralised Scotland who had only managed to draw with the Welsh and Irish. The Welsh improved following their initial loss, beating the Irish and holding the Scots to a 1–1 draw in Glasgow to claim second place.

== Table ==
Team	Pld	W	D	L	GF	GA	GD	Pts
England (C)	3	3	0	0	5	1	+4	6
Wales	3	1	1	1	3	4	−1	3
Scotland	3	0	2	1	2	3	−1	2
Northern Ireland	3	0	1	2	1	3	−2	1

Rules for classification: 1) points. The points system worked as follows: 2 points for a win and 1 point for a draw.
(C) Champions

== Results ==
13 May 1978

Scotland	1–1	Northern Ireland
Johnstone 36'		O'Neill 26'

Hampden Park, Glasgow
Referee: John Gow (Wales)

13 May 1978

Wales	1–3	England
Dwyer 57'		Latchford 8'; Currie 82'; Barnes 89'

Ninian Park, Cardiff
Referee: Malcolm Moffatt (Northern Ireland)

16 May 1978

England	1–0	Northern Ireland
Neal 44'

Wembley Stadium, London
Referee: John Gordon (Scotland)

17 May 1978

Scotland	1–1	Wales
Johnstone 10'		Donachie 90' (o.g.)

Hampden Park, Glasgow
Referee: Malcolm Wright (Northern Ireland)

19 May 1978

Wales	1–0	Northern Ireland
Deacy 70' (pen.)

Racecourse Ground, Wrexham
Referee: Ken Burns (England)

20 May 1978

Scotland	0–1	England
		Coppell 83'

Hampden Park, Glasgow
Referee: Georges Konrath (France)
