= Eric Caldow =

Scottish footballer and manager (1934–2019)

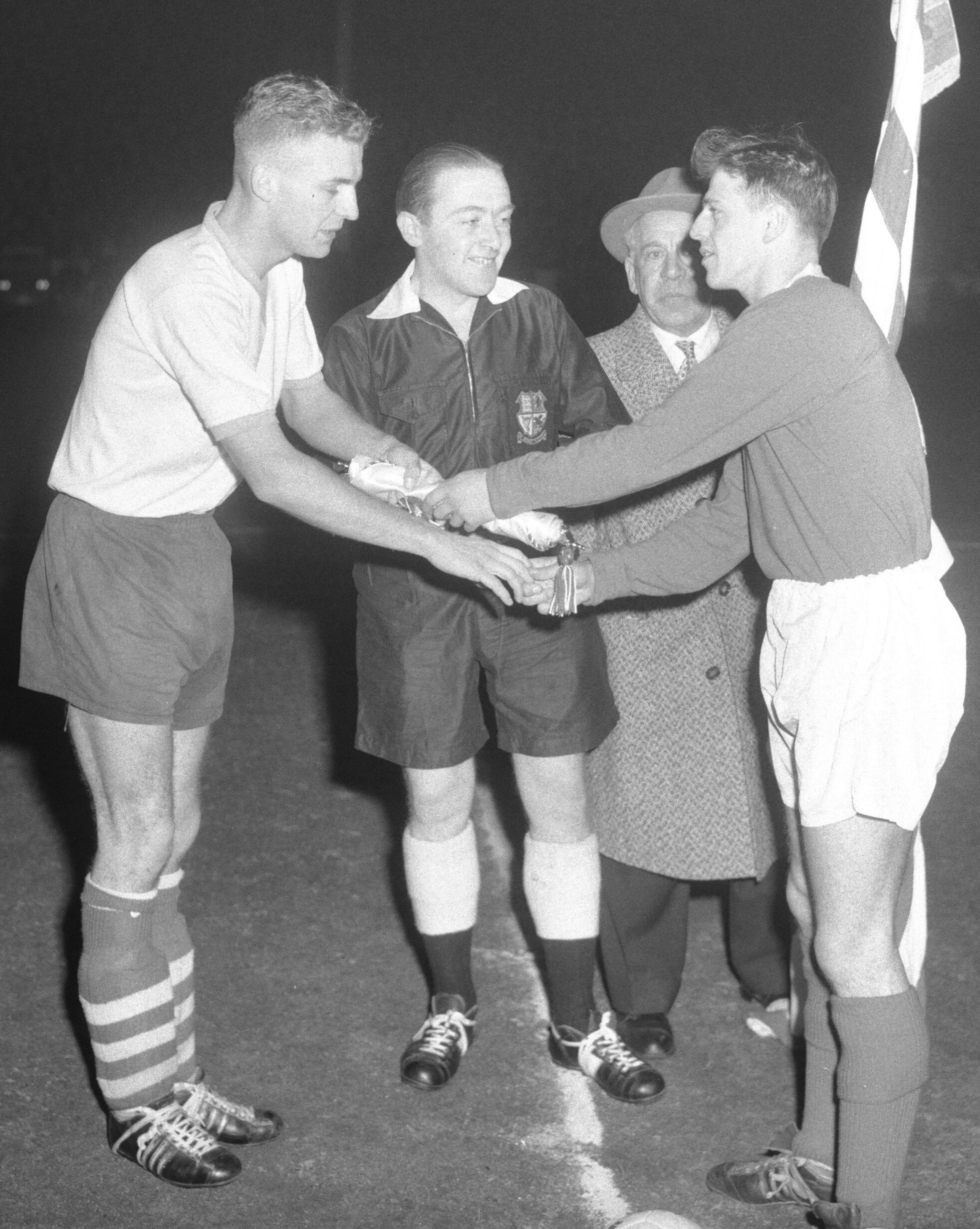
- Caldow (right) as Rangers captain prior to a European fixture against Sparta Rotterdam, 1960

Personal information
- Full name: Eric Caldow
- Date of birth: 14 May 1934
- Place of birth: Cumnock, Scotland
- Date of death: 4 March 2019 (aged 84)
- Place of death: Scotland
- Position: Defender

Youth career
- Glenpark Amateurs

Senior career*
Years	Team	Apps	(Gls)
- Muirkirk
1952–1966	Rangers	265	(17)
1966–1967	Stirling Albion	25	(1)
1968–1969	Corby Town		

International career
1955–1957	Scotland U23	2	(0)
1957–1963	Scotland	40	(4)
1957–1965	Scottish League XI	14	(1)
1958–1961	SFA trial v SFL	4	(0)

Managerial career
- 1967–????: Corby Town
- 1970–1973: Hurlford United
- 1973–1975: Stranraer
- * Club domestic league appearances and goals

Eric Caldow (14 May 1934 – 4 March 2019) was a Scottish professional footballer, who played for Rangers, Stirling Albion and Scotland. Caldow played as a full back and captained both Rangers and Scotland.

== Early life and career ==
Caldow attended Cumnock Academy and after leaving school became an apprentice painter with Cumnock Burgh Council. He started his football career with the local Glenpark Amateurs club, then Muirkirk of the Western Junior League.

== Rangers ==
Caldow was signed by Rangers manager Bill Struth in 1952 and made his first team debut on 12 September 1953 in a 4–2 win over Ayr United at Ibrox. He made a total of 13 appearances in his first professional season with Rangers and continued to make progress the following season, playing in 12 of Rangers' 41 matches. He became a regular in the Rangers team following the suspension of Willie Woodburn and George Young changing position to compensate.

In 1955–56 Caldow made 35 appearances, mostly at right back, as Rangers won the League title for the first time in two seasons. Rangers retained the League title the following season, 1956–57, and Caldow was once again an important member of the team, making 40 appearances, this time mostly at left-back.

Caldow continued to be an integral member of the Rangers team, featuring 49 times in 1957–58, including four European Cup matches against AS Saint-Étienne and AC Milan. Caldow also played in all of Scotland's three World Cup matches against Yugoslavia, Paraguay and France. After finishing third that season, Rangers regained the League title in 1958–59, with Caldow missing just one match.

Caldow won his first Scottish Cup medal in 1959–60, and despite failing to retain their League title, Rangers reached the semi-final of the European Cup, defeating Anderlecht, Cervena Hviezda Bratislava and Sparta Rotterdam before eventually losing to German club Eintracht Frankfurt.

European success continued for Rangers the following season as Caldow captained Rangers to the inaugural European Cup Winners' Cup, defeating Ferencváros, Borussia Mönchengladbach and Wolverhampton Wanderers before losing 4–1 to Fiorentina in the two-legged final. Caldow missed just one game that season as Rangers also regained the League title and won the League Cup.

Rangers again failed to retain the League title the following season, 1961–62, as surprise package Dundee edged out Rangers by three points. However, the League Cup was retained and the Scottish Cup was also won as Caldow played in 52 of Rangers' 58 matches. Rangers reached the quarter final stage of the 1961–62 European Cup, where they lost to Belgian club Standard Liège. Caldow succeeded Johnny Hubbard as the regular penalty taker for Rangers. His fifth and final League championship medal came in 1962–63 where he also won another Scottish Cup medal.

Following a long rehabilitation program from a broken leg on international duty, Caldow made only four appearances in 1963–64, as Rangers won a domestic treble. He re-established himself in the team at left-back during the 1964–65 season, playing 34 matches. He helped Rangers to a 2–1 League Cup final success against Celtic and to reach the quarter-final of the 1964–65 European Cup, where they lost 3–2 on aggregate to Inter Milan (3–1 defeat away, then a 1–0 win at home). It was a disappointing league season for Rangers, however, as they finished in fifth place in the League with Kilmarnock winning the championship.

1965–66 proved to be Caldow's last season at Rangers and he made only three appearances, the last being a 3–2 defeat to Falkirk on 9 March 1966. During his 13 years with the club, he made a total of 407 appearances.

== International career ==
Caldow won 40 caps for Scotland, 15 of which were as captain, and he also appeared 14 times for the Scottish League XI.

He won his first Scotland cap against England on 6 April 1957 in a 2–1 defeat at Wembley. Caldow played that match at right-back, which disappointed him as he had hoped to play at left-back and in direct opposition to Stanley Matthews. His next cap came in a 1958 World Cup qualifier against Spain, where he faced Real Madrid great Francisco Gento.

He captained Scotland for the first time in 1961, in a British Home Championship match with Wales. He scored four penalties for Scotland; one of these clinched the 1961–62 British Home Championship, as he scored the second in a 2–0 win against England. His international career came to an end in 1963, after he suffered a broken leg in three places in a 2–1 win against England at Wembley, following a tackle from England's Bobby Smith.

== Later life and career ==
After leaving Rangers, Caldow played for one season with Stirling Albion before moving south in 1967 to become player-manager of Corby Town. He returned to his native Ayrshire in 1970, to become manager of Junior side Hurlford United. In 1973, he was appointed manager of Scottish League side Stranraer, until 1975.

Caldow was inducted to the Scottish Football Hall of Fame in 2007. He died in March 2019, aged 84.

== Career statistics ==
=== International appearances ===
International statistics
National team	Year	Apps	Goals
Scotland	1957	8	0
Scotland	1958	7	0
Scotland	1959	6	0
Scotland	1960	6	2
Scotland	1961	8	0
Scotland	1962	4	2
Scotland	1963	1	0
Total		40	4

=== International goals ===
International goals by date, venue, cap, opponent, score, result and competition
No.	Date	Venue	Cap	Opponent	Score	Result	Competition
1	8 June 1960	Ankara 19 Mayıs Stadium, Ankara, Turkey	25	Turkey	1–1	2–4	Friendly match
2	9 November 1960	Hampden Park, Glasgow, Scotland	27	Northern Ireland	2–0	5–2	1960–61 British Home Championship
3	14 April 1962	Hampden Park, Glasgow, Scotland	36	England	2–0	2–0	1961–62 British Home Championship
4	20 October 1962	Ninian Park, Cardiff, Wales	38	Wales	1–0	3–2	1962–63 British Home Championship

== See also ==
- List of Scotland national football team captains
