= 1960–61 British Home Championship =

Tournament details
- Host country: England, Ireland, Scotland and Wales
- Dates: 8 October 1960 – 15 April 1961
- Teams: 4

Final positions
- Champions: England
- Runners-up: Wales

Tournament statistics
- Matches played: 6
- Goals scored: 40 (6.67 per match)
- Top scorer(s): (England) Jimmy Greaves (7)

The 1960–61 British Home Championship international football tournament saw a series of high scoring games, with 40 goals scored in six matches. England took the British title after a final match at Wembley in which they put nine goals past Scotland, who returned with three of their own. Teams in this period frequently fielded as many as five strikers, hoping to outscore opponents rather than rely on heavy defence. This tactic paid dividends, particularly for England, whose haul of 19 included seven for Jimmy Greaves, whilst both Bobby Charlton and Bobby Smith each scored in each of England's three games.

England had begun the tournament well, winning 5–2 against Ireland in Belfast, whilst the Welsh beat a tough Scottish side at home. Welsh hopes of tournament success were disabused in their second match, where England took them apart 5–1, whilst the Irish were again on the reverse of a heavy defeat, losing 5–2 in Glasgow against Scotland. In the tournament's final games, Wales beat Ireland 5–1 to claim second spot, leading to England and Scotland's dramatic finale.

Players at the tournament included a medley of stars from the 1950s, and young players who would take the 1960s by storm. This line-up included Danny Blanchflower and Peter McParland for Ireland, Ivor Allchurch and John Charles for Wales, Denis Law and Dave Mackay for Scotland and an England team including Bobby Charlton, Johnny Haynes, Jimmy Greaves and Bobby Robson, some of whom would later win the 1966 FIFA World Cup.

== Table ==
Team	Pld	W	D	L	GF	GA	GD	Pts
England (C)	3	3	0	0	19	6	+13	6
Wales	3	2	0	1	8	6	+2	4
Scotland	3	1	0	2	8	13	−5	2
Ireland	3	0	0	3	5	15	−10	0

Rules for classification: 1) points. The points system worked as follows: 2 points for a win and 1 point for a draw.
(C) Champions

== Results ==
8 October 1960

Ireland	2–5	England
McAdams		Greaves; Charlton; Smith; Douglas

Windsor Park, Belfast

22 October 1960

Wales	2–0	Scotland
C. Jones; Vernon

Ninian Park, Cardiff

9 November 1960

Scotland	5–2	Ireland
Brand; Young; Law; Caldow (pen.)		Blanchflower; McParland

Hampden Park, Glasgow

23 November 1960

England	5–1	Wales
Greaves; Charlton; Smith; Haynes		Ken Leek

Wembley Stadium, London

12 April 1961

Ireland	1–5	Wales
Dougan		C. Jones; Allchurch; Leek; Charles

Windsor Park, Belfast

15 April 1961

England	9–3	Scotland
Greaves; Smith; Haynes; Douglas; Robson		Mackay; Wilson (Note: The Scottish Football Association "International Matches: England 9-3 Scotland". Scottish FA. credits the 3rd Scotland goal in the 9–3 match to Davie Wilson, and footage from the match (England v Scotland 1961 (YouTube). and England 9-3 Scotland 1961 (YouTube).) appears to confirm this; most sources (and the contemporary commentary on the footage) credit the goal to Pat Quinn)

Wembley Stadium, London

== Sources ==
- Guy Oliver (1992). The Guinness Record of World Soccer. Guinness. ISBN 0-85112-954-4.
