= Bryan Douglas =

English footballer (born 1934)

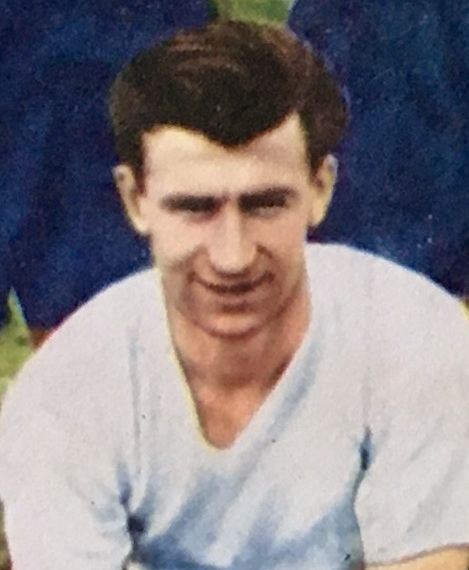
- Douglas in 1959

Personal information
- Date of birth: 27 May 1934 (age 92)
- Place of birth: Blackburn, England
- Position: Winger

Senior career*
Years	Team	Apps	(Gls)
1952–1969	Blackburn Rovers	438	(102)

International career
1956–1957	England U23	5	(0)
1956	England B	1	(0)
1957–1963	England	36	(11)
1965	United Kingdom	1	(2)
- * Club domestic league appearances and goals

Bryan Douglas (born 27 May 1934) is an English former footballer who played as a winger.

A one-club man, Douglas played for Blackburn Rovers from 1954 to 1969, totalling 438 league appearances and 100 goals. He also earned 36 caps and scored 11 goals for England. He appeared in two World Cups, in 1958 and 1962, appearing in all of England's matches in the two tournaments.

In November 2012, the Darwen End stand of Ewood Park was renamed The Bryan Douglas Darwen End in honour of Douglas. He said of the tribute: "The first person to congratulate me was Ronnie's wife Val. He is at one end of the ground and I'm at the other end and long may that continue. We were great friends. They have put me at the right end as well. I was born just 400 yards away from the Darwen End. It is a really proud moment."

In February 2019, Douglas was one of the first seven players to be inducted into the club's Hall of Fame. He is the last surviving member of England's 1958 and 1962 World Cup squads.

== Honours ==
Blackburn Rovers

- FA Cup runner-up: 1959–60
