= 1979–80 Cardiff City F.C. season =

Welsh football club season

Cardiff City
1979–80 season
- Chairman: Bob Grogan
- Manager: Richie Morgan
- Football League Second Division: 15th
- FA Cup: 3rd round
- League Cup: 2nd round
- Welsh Cup: 4th round
- Top goalscorer: League: Ray Bishop & Gary Stevens (11); All: Ray Bishop & Gary Stevens (11)
- Highest home attendance: 19,340 (v Sunderland, 3 May 1980)
- Lowest home attendance: 6,358 (v Burnley, 23 February 1980)
- Average home league attendance: 9,932
Home colours

The 1979–80 season was Cardiff City F.C.'s 53rd season in the Football League. They competed in the 22-team Division Two, then the second tier of English football, finishing fifteenth.

== Players ==
Note: Flags indicate national team as defined under FIFA eligibility rules; some limited exceptions apply. Players may hold more than one non-FIFA nationality.

No.	Pos.	Nation	Player
--	GK	WAL	John Davies
--	GK	ENG	Peter Grotier
--	GK	ENG	Ron Healey
--	DF	ENG	Paul Compton
--	DF	WAL	Phil Dwyer
--	DF	WAL	Linden Jones
--	DF	WAL	Keith Pontin
--	DF	WAL	David Roberts
--	DF	ENG	Colin Sullivan
--	DF	WAL	Rod Thomas
--	MF	SCO	John Buchanan
--	MF	SCO	Alan Campbell
--	MF	WAL	Mark Elliott

No.	Pos.	Nation	Player
--	MF	ENG	Steve Grapes
--	MF	ENG	Gary Harris
--	MF	WAL	Wayne Hughes
--	MF	WAL	John Lewis
--	MF	WAL	Tarki Micallef
--	MF	ENG	Billy Ronson
--	FW	WAL	Ray Bishop
--	FW	ENG	Paul Davies
--	FW	ENG	Tony Evans
--	FW	SCO	Ross Jack
--	FW	ENG	Kevin Lloyd
--	FW	ENG	Ronnie Moore
--	FW	ENG	Gary Stevens

Source.

== League standings ==
Pos	Team	Pld	W	D	L	GF	GA	GD	Pts
13	Shrewsbury Town	42	18	5	19	60	53	+7	41
14	Orient	42	12	17	13	48	54	−6	41
15	Cardiff City	42	16	8	18	41	48	−7	40
16	Wrexham	42	16	6	20	40	49	−9	38
17	Notts County	42	11	15	16	51	52	−1	37

Rules for classification: 1) Points; 2) Goal difference; 3) Goals scored

=== Results by round ===
Round	1	2	3	4	5	6	7	8	9	10	11	12	13	14	15	16	17	18	19	20	21	22	23	24	25	26	27	28	29	30	31	32	33	34	35	36	37	38	39	40	41	42
Ground	A	H	H	A	H	A	H	A	H	A	A	H	A	H	A	H	A	H	A	H	A	H	A	A	H	A	H	A	H	H	A	H	A	H	A	H	H	A	A	H	A	H
Result	L	W	L	W	W	D	D	D	W	L	W	L	L	W	L	D	L	W	L	L	D	W	L	L	W	W	W	L	L	W	L	W	W	D	D	W	L	W	L	L	L	D
Position		15	19	14	9	10	12	11			9	11	12	12	13	13	13	13	14	14	14	13	14	14	14	12	11	11	13	12	13	13	11	12	14	13	14	10	10	13	15	15
Points	0	2	2	4	6	7	8	9	11	11	13	13	13	15	15	16	16	18	18	18	19	21	21	21	23	25	27	27	27	29	29	31	33	34	35	37	37	39	39	39	39	40

Source: Competitive matches
A = Away; H = Home; W = Win; D = Draw; L = Loss

== Fixtures and results ==
=== Second Division ===
18 August 1979 1	Notts County	4–1	Cardiff City	Nottingham
	Iain McCulloch 48'; Gordon Mair 79'; Pedro Richards 81'; Don Masson 85'		52' Linden Jones	Stadium: Meadow Lane; Attendance: 7,157; Referee: Ray Toseland (Kettering)

22 August 1979 2	Cardiff City	1–0	Queens Park Rangers	Cardiff
18:30	Gary Stevens 44'			Stadium: Ninian Park; Attendance: 11,656; Referee: Bill Bombroff (Bristol)

25 August 1979 3	Cardiff City	1–2	Birmingham City	Cardiff
15:00	Gary Stevens 22'		4' Tony Evans; 9' Tony Evans	Stadium: Ninian Park; Attendance: 11,314; Referee: Brian Stevens (Stonehouse)

1 September 1979 4	Wrexham	0–1	Cardiff City	Wrexham
15:00		Wrexham report	(74s) Gary Stevens	Stadium: Racecourse; Attendance: 9,830; Referee: Alan Porter (Bolton)

8 September 1979 5	Cardiff City	1–0	Shrewsbury Town	Cardiff
15:00	Gary Stevens 80'			Stadium: Ninian Park; Attendance: 8,668; Referee: Leslie Burden (Dorset)

15 September 1979 6	Watford	1–1	Cardiff City	London
15:00	Ray Train 64'		90' Gary Stevens	Stadium: Vicarage Road; Attendance: 13,741; Referee: Ray Lewis (Great Bookham, Surrey)

22 September 1979 7	Cardiff City	0–0	Cambridge United	Cardiff
15:00				Stadium: Ninian Park; Attendance: 8,539

29 September 1979 8	Bristol Rovers	1–1	Cardiff City	Bristol
15:00	Frankie Prince 22'		28' Keith Pontin	Stadium: Eastville; Attendance: 8,949; Referee: Alex Hamil (Wolverhampton)

6 October 1979 9	Cardiff City	2–1	Luton Town	Cardiff
11:30	Ray Bishop 30'; Ray Bishop 82'	Luton report	23' Bob Hatton	Stadium: Ninian Park; Attendance: 9,420; Referee: Alan Seville (Birmingham)

9 October 1979 10	Queens Park Rangers	3–0	Cardiff City	London
19:30	Clive Allen 60' (pen.); Glenn Roeder 72'; Clive Allen 81'			Stadium: Loftus Road; Attendance: 12,225; Referee: David Hutchinson (Cambridgeshire)

13 October 1979 11	Burnley	0–2	Cardiff City	Burnley
15:00			40' Ray Bishop; 52' Ronson	Stadium: Turf Moor; Attendance: 6,361

20 October 1979 12	Cardiff City	1–2	Chelsea	Cardiff
15:00	Ronnie Moore 45'		54' Lee Frost; 69' Mike Fillery	Stadium: Ninian Park; Attendance: 16,328; Referee: Morris Baker (Wolverhampton)

27 October 1979 13	Charlton Athletic	3–2	Cardiff City	London
15:00	Steve Gritt 42'; Les Berry 48'; Steve Gritt 60'		68' Ray Bishop; 89' Wayne Hughes	Stadium: The Valley; Attendance: 6,870; Referee: David Letts (Basingstoke)

3 November 1979 14	Cardiff City	3–2	Notts County	Cardiff
15:00	Ray Bishop 16'; John Buchanan 18'; Ray Bishop 35'		30' Jeff Blockley; 52' David Hunt	Stadium: Ninian Park; Attendance: 8,341; Referee: Derek Civil (Birmingham)

10 November 1979 15	Newcastle United	1–0	Cardiff City	Newcastle
	Alan Shoulder 40'			Stadium: St James' Park; Attendance: 21,243; Referee: David Richardson (Lancashire)

17 November 1979 16	Cardiff City	0–0	Orient	Cardiff
15:00				Stadium: Ninian Park; Attendance: 8,119; Referee: Mike Warner (Wednesbury)

24 November 1979 17	West Ham United	3–0	Cardiff City	London
15:00	David Cross 27'; Ray Stewart 45' (pen.); Ray Stewart 86' (pen.)			Stadium: Upton Park; Attendance: 20,292; Referee: Darryl Reeves (Uxbridge)

1 December 1979 18	Cardiff City	1–0	Oldham Athletic	Cardiff
14:30	Ray Bishop 55'			Stadium: Ninian Park; Attendance: 7,061

8 December 1979 19	Sunderland	2–1	Cardiff City	Sunderland
	Phil Dwyer 25' (o.g.); Pop Robson 55'	Report	86' Ray Bishop	Stadium: Roker Park; Attendance: 25,370; Referee: Trelford Mills (Barnsley)

15 December 1979 20	Cardiff City	0–2	Preston North End	Cardiff
14:15			2' Alex Bruce; 60' Alex Bruce	Stadium: Ninian Park; Attendance: 6,419; Referee: Derek Lloyd (Worcester)

21 December 1979 21	Leicester City	0–0	Cardiff City	Leicester
19:45				Stadium: Filbert Street; Attendance: 12,877; Referee: Mike Bidmead (Chessington)

26 December 1979 22	Cardiff City	1–0	Fulham	Cardiff
15:00	Keith Pontin 57'			Stadium: Ninian Park; Attendance: 8,354; Referee: Bert Newsome (Broseley, Salop)

29 December 1979 23	Birmingham City	2–1	Cardiff City	Birmingham
	Frank Worthington 10'; Keith Bertschin 59'		57' Ray Bishop	Stadium: St Andrew's; Attendance: 16,682; Referee: Frank Phipps (Wrexham)

1 January 1980 24	Swansea	2–1	Cardiff City	Swansea
15:00	John Toshack 27'; David Giles 93'		37' John Lewis	Stadium: Vetch Field; Attendance: 21,400; Referee: Brian Stevens (Stonehouse)

12 January 1980 25	Cardiff City	1–0	Wrexham	Cardiff
15:00	Ronnie Moore 44'	Wrexham report		Stadium: Ninian Park; Attendance: 10,824; Referee: Eric Read (Bristol)

19 January 1980 26	Shrewsbury Town	1–2	Cardiff City	Shrewsbury
	John Dungworth 10'		78' John Buchanan; 87' Ronnie Moore	Stadium: Gay Meadow; Attendance: 6,870; Referee: David Clarke (Accrington)

2 February 1980 27	Cardiff City	1–0	Watford	Cardiff
15:00	John Lewis 90'			Stadium: Ninian Park; Attendance: 7,995; Referee: Maurice Robinson (Sutton Colefield)

9 February 1980 28	Cambridge United	2–0	Cardiff City	Cambridge
15:00	George Reilly 36'; Tommy Finney 56'			Stadium: Abbey Stadium; Attendance: 5,229; Referee: Danny Vickers (Essex)

16 February 1980 29	Cardiff City	0–1	Bristol Rovers	Cardiff
11:30			65' David Williams	Stadium: Ninian Park; Attendance: 6,840; Referee: Peter Reeves (Leicester)

23 February 1980 30	Cardiff City	2–1	Burnley	Cardiff
15:00	Keith Pontin 15'; Gary Stevens 80'		Billy Hamilton	Stadium: Ninian Park; Attendance: 6,358; Referee: Tony Glasson (Salisbury)

1 March 1980 31	Chelsea	1–0	Cardiff City	London
15:00	Clive Walker 84'			Stadium: Stamford Bridge; Attendance: 18,449; Referee: John Hunting (Leicester)

8 March 1980 32	Cardiff City	3–1	Charlton Athletic	Cardiff
15:00	Gary Stevens 45'; Gary Stevens 47'; John Buchanan 71'		54' Derek Hales	Stadium: Ninian Park; Attendance: 6,652; Referee: Malcolm Heath (Stoke)

14 March 1980 33	Luton Town	1–2	Cardiff City	Luton
	David Moss 24'	Luton report	44' John Buchanan; 49' Gary Stevens	Stadium: Kenilworth Road; Attendance: 9,246; Referee: Mike Bidmead (Chessington)

22 March 1980 34	Cardiff City	1–1	Newcastle United	Cardiff
15:00	Gary Stevens 8'		36' Bobby Shinton	Stadium: Ninian Park; Attendance: 9,304; Referee: Ken Baker (Rugby)

29 March 1980 35	Orient	1–1	Cardiff City	London
15:00	Bill Roffey 2'		66' John Buchanan	Stadium: Brisbane Road; Attendance: 4,081; Referee: Ron Challis (Tonbridge)

7 April 1980 36	Cardiff City	1–0	Swansea	Cardiff
15:00	Ronson 84'			Stadium: Ninian Park; Attendance: 14,677; Referee: Alan Robinson (Waterlooville)

8 April 1980 37	Cardiff City	0–1	Leicester City	Cardiff
19:30			29' Bobby Smith	Stadium: Ninian Park; Attendance: 10,291; Referee: Colin Downey (Hounslow)

12 April 1980 38	Oldham Athletic	0–3	Cardiff City	Oldham
15:00			17' John Buchanan; 49' Gary Stevens; 79' Tarki Micallef	Stadium: Boundary Park; Attendance: 6,339; Referee: David Richardson (Lancashire)

15 April 1980 39	Fulham	2–1	Cardiff City	London
	Ray Lewington 35'; Steve Grapes 39' (o.g.)		19' Ray Bishop	Stadium: Craven Cottage; Attendance: 4,916

19 April 1980 40	Cardiff City	0–1	West Ham United	Cardiff
15:00			29' Ray Stewart	Stadium: Ninian Park; Attendance: 12,076; Referee: Derek Lloyd (Worcester)

26 April 1980 41	Preston North End	2–0	Cardiff City	Preston
15:00	Paul McGee 9'; Gordon Coleman 60'			Stadium: Deepdale; Attendance: 7,481; Referee: George Tyson (Sunderland)

3 May 1980 42	Cardiff City	1–1	Sunderland	Cardiff
15:00	Ray Bishop 55'		61' Pop Robson	Stadium: Ninian Park; Attendance: 19,340; Referee: Bert Newsome (Broseley Salop)

=== League Cup ===
29 August 1979 Round 2 (First Leg)	Everton	2–0	Cardiff City	Liverpool
19:30	Brian Kidd 27', 66'			Stadium: Goodison Park; Attendance: 18,061

5 September 1979 Round 2 (Second Leg)	Cardiff City	1–0 (1–2 agg.)	Everton	Cardiff
18:00	John Buchanan 78'			Stadium: Ninian Park; Attendance: 9,698; Referee: Trevor Spencer (Wootton Bassett)

=== FA Cup ===
5 January 1980 Round 3	Cardiff City	0–0	Arsenal	Cardiff
15:00				Stadium: Ninian Park; Attendance: 21,972; Referee: Joe Worrall (Workington)

8 January 1980 Round 3 (Replay)	Arsenal	2–1	Cardiff City	London
19:30	Alan Sunderland 3', 35'		23' John Buchanan	Stadium: Highbury; Attendance: 36,582; Referee: Joe Worrall (Workington)

=== Welsh Cup ===
22 January 1980 Round 4	Newport County	2–0	Cardiff City	Newport
19:15	John Aldridge 63'; Tommy Tynan 90'			Stadium: Somerton Park; Attendance: 7,709; Referee: Clive Thomas (Treorchy)

== See also ==
- Cardiff City F.C. seasons

== Bibliography ==
- Hayes, Dean (2006). The Who's Who of Cardiff City. Breedon Books. ISBN 1-85983-462-0.
- Crooks, John (1986). Cardiff City Chronology 1920-86. John Crooks. ISBN 0-9511984-0-8.
- Shepherd, Richard (2002). The Definitive Cardiff City F.C. Tony Brown. ISBN 1-899-46817-X.
- Crooks, John (1992). Cardiff City Football Club: Official History of the Bluebirds. Yore Publications. ISBN 0-9513321-8-X.
- "Football Club History Database – Cardiff City". Archived from the original on 30 December 2008.
- Welsh Football Data Archive
