= 1978–79 Cardiff City F.C. season =

Welsh football club season

Cardiff City
1978–79 season
- Chairman: Bob Grogan
- Manager: Jimmy Andrews/Richie Morgan
- Football League Second Division: 9th
- FA Cup: 3rd round
- League Cup: 1st round
- Welsh Cup: 6th round
- Top goalscorer: League: John Buchanan (16); All: John Buchanan (18)
- Highest home attendance: 14,869 (v Stoke, 24 March 1979)
- Lowest home attendance: 5,558 (v Fulham, 23 December 1978)
- Average home league attendance: 9,259
Home colours

The 1978–79 season was Cardiff City F.C.'s 52nd season in the Football League. They competed in the 22-team Division Two, then the second tier of English football, finishing ninth.

During the season manager Jimmy Andrews, who had been in charge of the club for just over three years, left the club after several poor results and the disappointing hiring of Micky Burns as a player-coach. Andrews was replaced by Richie Morgan, a former player who had spent his entire professional playing career at the club before retiring in 1977 to joins the backroom staff.

== Players ==
Note: Flags indicate national team as defined under FIFA eligibility rules; some limited exceptions apply. Players may hold more than one non-FIFA nationality.

Pos.	Nation	Player
GK	ENG	Keith Barber
GK	WAL	John Davies
GK	ENG	Ron Healey
GK	NIR	Jim Platt
DF	WAL	Bryan Attley
DF	WAL	Phil Dwyer
DF	WAL	Linden Jones
DF	NIR	Albert Larmour
DF	WAL	Freddie Pethard
DF	WAL	Keith Pontin
DF	WAL	David Roberts
DF	ENG	Colin Sullivan
DF	WAL	Rod Thomas
DF	ENG	Paul Went

Pos.	Nation	Player
MF	SCO	John Buchanan
MF	SCO	Gerry Byrne
MF	SCO	Alan Campbell
MF	WAL	David Giles
MF	ENG	Steve Grapes
MF	ENG	Gary Harris
MF	WAL	John Lewis
MF	ENG	Paul Manns
MF	WAL	Tarki Micallef
FW	WAL	Ray Bishop
FW	ENG	Micky Burns
FW	ENG	Tony Evans
FW	ENG	Ronnie Moore
FW	ENG	Gary Stevens

Source.

== League standings ==
Pos	Team	Pld	W	D	L	GF	GA	GD	Pts
7	Preston North End	42	12	18	12	59	57	+2	42
8	Newcastle United	42	17	8	17	51	55	−4	42
9	Cardiff City	42	16	10	16	56	70	−14	42
10	Fulham	42	13	15	14	50	47	+3	41
11	Orient	42	15	10	17	51	51	0	40

Rules for classification: 1) Points; 2) Goal difference; 3) Goals scored

=== Results by round ===
Round	1	2	3	4	5	6	7	8	9	10	11	12	13	14	15	16	17	18	19	20	21	22	23	24	25	26	27	28	29	30	31	32	33	34	35	36	37	38	39	40	41	42
Ground	H	A	H	A	H	A	H	A	H	A	H	A	H	A	A	H	A	H	A	H	A	A	A	H	A	A	H	A	H	A	A	H	A	H	A	H	H	A	H	H	H	H
Result	D	L	L	L	W	L	W	W	L	D	W	L	L	L	L	D	L	D	L	W	L	D	L	W	W	W	W	D	L	L	L	W	D	W	D	W	W	W	D	W	D	W
Position	8	17	22	22	22	22	20	17	19	19	15	17	20	20	21	21	21	21	22	20	20	20	20	20	20	18	18	18	19	19	20	19	19	19	20	18	15	14	13	13	13	9
Points	1	1	1	1	3	3	5	7	7	8	10	10	10	10	10	11	11	12	12	14	14	15	15	17	19	21	23	24	24	24	24	26	27	29	30	32	34	36	37	39	40	42

Source: Competitive matches
A = Away; H = Home; W = Win; D = Draw; L = Loss

== Fixtures and results ==
=== Second Division ===
19 August 1978 1	Cardiff City	2–2	Preston North End	Cardiff
15:00	Paul Went 19'; Phil Dwyer 44'		34' Alex Bruce; 48' Alex Bruce	Stadium: Ninian Park; Attendance: 7,812; Referee: Brian Stevens (Stonehouse)

23 August 1978 2	Stoke City	2–0	Cardiff City	Stoke
	Dennis Smith 75'; Viv Busby 86'			Stadium: Victoria Ground; Attendance: 16,005; Referee: Gwyn Owen (Anglesey)

26 August 1978 3	Cardiff City	1–3	Oldham Athletic	Cardiff
15:00	John Buchanan 14'		45' Jim Steel; 68' Jim Steel; 70' Mark Hilton	Stadium: Ninian Park; Attendance: 6,929; Referee: Morris Baker (Wolverhampton)

2 September 1978 4	Bristol Rovers	4–2	Cardiff City	Bristol
15:00	Steve Grapes 6' (o.g.); Paul Randall 32'; David Staniforth 73'; David Staniforth 86'		81' Dave Roberts; 87' (pen.) John Buchanan	Stadium: Eastville; Attendance: 6,855; Referee: Malcolm Sinclair (Guildford)

9 September 1978 5	Cardiff City	1–0	Cambridge United	Cardiff
15:00	John Buchanan 68'			Stadium: Ninian Park; Attendance: 6,154; Referee: Trevor Spencer (Wootton Bassett)

16 September 1978 6	Luton Town	7–1	Cardiff City	Luton
15:00	David Moss 12'; Bob Hatton 18'; Brian Stein 51'; Brian Stein 55'; Lil Fuccillo 78' (pen.); David Moss 82'; Phil Dwyer 87' (o.g.)		80' Ray Bishop	Stadium: Kenilworth Road; Attendance: 7,752; Referee: Mike Taylor (Deal)

23 September 1978 7	Cardiff City	2–0	Blackburn Rovers	Cardiff
15:00	Gary Stevens 30'; Ray Bishop 60'			Stadium: Ninian Park; Attendance: 6,248; Referee: Les Burden (Dorset)

30 September 1978 8	Wrexham	1–2	Cardiff City	Wrexham
15:00	John Lyons 66'	Wrexham report	30', 71' (pen.) John Buchanan	Stadium: Racecourse; Attendance: 11,766; Referee: Norman Glover (Adlington, Lancashire)

7 October 1978 9	Cardiff City	2–3	Notts County	Cardiff
15:00	John Buchanan 63'; Gary Stevens 70'		41' Paul Hooks; 55' Paul Hooks; 83' Iain McCulloch	Stadium: Ninian Park; Attendance: 7,974; Referee: Lester Shapter (Paignton)

14 October 1978 10	Orient	2–2	Cardiff City	London
15:00	Joe Mayo 19'; Tony Grealish 87'		4' John Buchanan; 77' Gary Stevens	Stadium: Brisbane Road; Attendance: 6,064; Referee: John Martin (Alton, Hampshire)

21 October 1978 11	Cardiff City	1–0	Leicester City	Cardiff
11:00	Gary Stevens 22'			Stadium: Ninian Park; Attendance: 8,791; Referee: Bill Bombroff (Bristol)

28 October 1978 12	Newcastle United	3–0	Cardiff City	Newcastle
	Peter Withe 7'; Stuart Robinson 65'; John Connolly 78'			Stadium: St James' Park; Attendance: 23,462; Referee: George Flint (Kirby in Ashfield)

4 November 1978 13	Cardiff City	1–4	Charlton Athletic	Cardiff
14:30	Gary Stevens 41'		35' Lawrie Madden; 45' Martin Robinson; 50' Terry Brisley; 79' Terry Brisley	Stadium: Ninian Park; Attendance: 7,842; Referee: Ken Baker (Rugby)

11 November 1978 14	Preston North End	2–1	Cardiff City	Preston
15:00	Michael Robinson 30'; Michael Robinson 42'		59' Tony Evans	Stadium: Deepdale; Attendance: 9,268; Referee: Pat Partridge (Middlesbrough)

18 November 1978 15	Oldham Athletic	2–1	Cardiff City	Oldham
15:00	Vic Halom 56'; Steve Taylor 81'		2' Ray Bishop	Stadium: Boundary Park; Attendance: 5,356

25 November 1978 16	Cardiff City	2–2	Crystal Palace	Cardiff
14:15	Tony Evans 22'; Phil Dwyer 38'		6' Mike Elwiss; 51' David Swindlehurst	Stadium: Ninian Park; Attendance: 8,739; Referee: Stephen Bates (Bristol)

2 December 1978 17	Millwall	2–0	Cardiff City	London
15:00	John Mitchell 33'; Phil Dwyer 55' (o.g.)			Stadium: The Den; Attendance: 5,381; Referee: Alf Grey (Great Yarmouth)

9 December 1978 18	Cardiff City	1–1	Sunderland	Cardiff
14:00	Tony Evans 30' (pen.)		35' Wilf Rostron	Stadium: Ninian Park; Attendance: 7,178; Referee: Don Biddle (Bristol)

16 December 1978 19	Sheffield United	2–1	Cardiff City	Sheffield
15:00	Peter Anderson 32'; John Matthews 76'		65' (pen.) Tony Evans	Stadium: Bramall Lane; Attendance: 11,913; Referee: Gilbert Napthine (Loughborough)

23 December 1978 20	Cardiff City	2–0	Fulham	Cardiff
14:00	Tony Evans 26'; Dave Roberts 62'			Stadium: Ninian Park; Attendance: 5,558; Referee: Derek Lloyd (Worcester)

26 December 1978 21	Brighton & Hove Albion	5–0	Cardiff City	Brighton
15:00	Gary Williams 1'; Teddy Maybank 22'; Brian Horton 43' (pen.); Teddy Maybank 48'; Teddy Maybank 62'			Stadium: Goldstone Ground; Attendance: 20,172; Referee: Tony Cox

30 December 1978 22	Burnley	0–0	Cardiff City	Burnley
15:00				Stadium: Turf Moor; Attendance: 9,807; Referee: Kevin McNally (Wirral)

13 January 1979 23	Cambridge United	5–0	Cardiff City	Cambridge
15:00	Tommy Finney 48'; Alan Biley 56'; Alan Biley 64'; Alan Biley 66'; Bill Garner 86'			Stadium: Abbey Stadium; Attendance: 5,344; Referee: Allan Gunn (Burgess Hill)

24 February 1979 24	Cardiff City	1–0	Orient	Cardiff
15:00	John Buchanan 28'			Stadium: Ninian Park; Attendance: 8,256; Referee: Tony Glasson (Salisbury)

28 February 1979 25	Blackburn Rovers	1–4	Cardiff City	Blackburn
15:00	Simon Garner 32'; John Bailey (red card)		37' Gary Stevens; 50' Ronnie Moore; 65' John Buchanan; 88' Tony Evans	Stadium: Ewood Park; Attendance: 7,158; Referee: G Owen

3 March 1979 26	Leicester City	1–2	Cardiff City	Leicester
15:00	Neil Grewcock 24'		63' Phil Dwyer; 90' Gary Stevens	Stadium: Filbert Street; Attendance: 12,820; Referee: Derek Civil (Birmingham)

10 March 1979 27	Cardiff City	2–1	Newcastle United	Cardiff
15:00	Ray Bishop 43'; Gary Stevens 62'		69' John Connolly	Stadium: Ninian Park; Attendance: 11,116; Referee: Lester Shapter (Paignton)

17 March 1979 28	Charlton Athletic	1–1	Cardiff City	London
	Dave Campbell 43'		92' (pen.) John Buchanan	Stadium: The Valley; Attendance: 5,658; Referee: Clive White (Harrow)

24 March 1979 29	Cardiff City	1–3	Stoke City	Cardiff
15:00	John Buchanan 57' (pen.)		15' Paul Randall; 42' Brendan O'Callaghan; 67' Garth Crooks	Stadium: Ninian Park; Attendance: 14,869; Referee: Stephen Bates (Bristol)

27 March 1979 30	Notts County	1–0	Cardiff City	Nottingham
	Ian McCulloch 9'			Stadium: Meadow Lane; Attendance: 8,211; Referee: Neil Midgley (Eccles)

31 March 1979 31	Crystal Palace	2–0	Cardiff City	London
15:00	Neil Smillie 22'; Ian Walsh 31'; David Swindlehurst (red card)		(red card) Phil Dwyer; (red card) Keith Pontin	Stadium: Selhurst Park; Attendance: 18,672; Referee: Alan Robinson (Fareham)

7 April 1979 32	Cardiff City	2–1	Millwall	Cardiff
15:00	Gary Stevens 10'; Barry Kitchener 51' (o.g.)		81' (pen.) Nicky Chatterton	Stadium: Ninian Park; Attendance: 7,714; Referee: Derek Lloyd (Worcester)

11 April 1979 33	Fulham	2–2	Cardiff City	London
19:30	Peter Kitchen 40'; Kevin Lock 45' (pen.)		29' Phil Dwyer; 35' (o.g.) Richard Money	Stadium: Craven Cottage; Attendance: 6,067

14 April 1979 34	Cardiff City	3–1	Brighton & Hove Albion	Cardiff
15:00	Gary Stevens 37'; Tony Evans 41'; Ronnie Moore 90'		14' Peter Ward	Stadium: Ninian Park; Attendance: 12,613; Referee: Brian Stevens (Stonehouse)

16 April 1979 35	West Ham United	1–1	Cardiff City	London
15:00	Pat Holland 6'		78' Ray Bishop	Stadium: Upton Park; Attendance: 29,058; Referee: Roger Kirkpatrick (Leicester)

21 April 1979 36	Cardiff City	4–0	Sheffield United	Cardiff
15:00	Gary Stevens 5'; John Buchanan 37' (pen.); John Buchanan 47'; John Buchanan 62'			Stadium: Ninian Park; Attendance: 10,592; Referee: Edward Hughes (Weston)

25 April 1979 37	Cardiff City	2–1	Luton Town	Cardiff
18:45	Ronnie Moore; Gary Stevens 86'		(o.g.) Dave Roberts	Stadium: Ninian Park; Attendance: 10,549; Referee: Eric Read (Bristol)

28 April 1979 38	Sunderland	1–2	Cardiff City	Sunderland
	Jack Ashurst 64'		26' Ronnie Moore; 63' Ray Bishop	Stadium: Roker Park; Attendance: 36,526; Referee: Keith Styles (Barnsley)

5 May 1979 39	Cardiff City	1–1	Burnley	Cardiff
15:00	Colin Sullivan 53'		41' Steve Kindon	Stadium: Ninian Park; Attendance: 10,270; Referee: Bert Newsome (Broseley, Shropshire)

7 May 1979 40	Cardiff City	2–0	Bristol Rovers	Cardiff
19:00	Gary Stevens 25'; John Buchanan 58' (pen.)			Stadium: Ninian Park; Attendance: 10,185; Referee: Angus McDonald (Sutton Coldfield)

11 May 1979 41	Cardiff City	0–0	West Ham United	Cardiff
19:00				Stadium: Ninian Park; Attendance: 13,140; Referee: Trevor Spencer (Wootton Bassett, Wiltshire)

14 May 1979 42	Cardiff City	1–0	Wrexham	Cardiff
19:15	John Buchanan 33'	Wrexham report		Stadium: Ninian Park; Attendance: 11,910; Referee: Ray Lewis (Great Bookham, Surrey)

=== League Cup ===
12 August 1978 Round 1 (First leg)	Cardiff City	1–2	Oxford United	Cardiff
15:00	John Buchanan 60'		14' Les Taylor; 31' Peter Foley	Stadium: Ninian Park; Attendance: 4,687; Referee: Derek Lloyd (Worcester)

16 August 1978 Round 1 (Second leg)	Oxford United	2–1 (4–2 agg.)	Cardiff City	Oxford
19:30	David Fogg 20' (pen.); Peter Foley 24'		58' Ray Bishop	Stadium: Manor Ground; Attendance: 4,760

=== FA Cup ===
9 January 1979 Round 3	Swindon Town	3–0	Cardiff City	Swindon
	Ray McHale 11'; Chris Kamara 41'; Chris Kamara 47'			Stadium: County Ground; Attendance: 9,983; Referee: Tom Bune (Sussex)

=== Welsh Cup ===
17 January 1979 Round 5	Cardiff City	2–1	Merthyr Tydfil	Cardiff
14:30	Gary Stevens 37'; Tony Evans 55' (pen.)		24' Ray Pratt	Stadium: Ninian Park; Attendance: 694

12 February 1979 Round 6	Worcester City	3–2	Cardiff City	Worcester
	Freddie Pethard 11' (o.g.); Jimmy Williams; Graham Allner		44' Phil Dwyer; 49' John Buchanan	Stadium: St George's Lane; Attendance: 2,500; Referee: Ron Bridges (Deeside)

== See also ==
- Cardiff City F.C. seasons

== Bibliography ==
- Hayes, Dean (2006). The Who's Who of Cardiff City. Breedon Books. ISBN 1-85983-462-0.
- Shepherd, Richard (2002). The Definitive Cardiff City F.C. Tony Brown. ISBN 1-899-46817-X.
- Crooks, John (1992). Cardiff City Football Club: Official History of the Bluebirds. Yore Publications. ISBN 0-9513321-8-X.
- Crooks, John (1986). Cardiff City Chronology 1920-86. John Crooks. ISBN 0-9511984-0-8.
- "Football Club History Database – Cardiff City". Archived from the original on 30 December 2008.
- Welsh Football Data Archive
