= 1977–78 Cardiff City F.C. season =

Welsh football club season

Cardiff City
1977–78 season
- Chairman: Stefan Terlezki/Bob Grogan
- Manager: Jimmy Andrews
- Football League Second Division: 19th
- FA Cup: 3rd round
- League Cup: 2nd round
- European Cup Winners Cup: 1st round
- Welsh Cup: Semi-finals
- Top goalscorer: League: John Buchanan (10); All: John Buchanan (14)
- Highest home attendance: 12,566 (v Bolton, 22 April 1978)
- Lowest home attendance: 5,675 (v Hull City, 17 December 1977)
- Average home league attendance: 8,369
Home colours

The 1977–78 season was Cardiff City F.C.'s 51st season in the Football League. They competed in the 22-team Division Two, then the second tier of English football, finishing nineteenth.

== Players ==
First team squad.

Note: Flags indicate national team as defined under FIFA eligibility rules; some limited exceptions apply. Players may hold more than one non-FIFA nationality.

No.	Pos.	Nation	Player
--	GK	ENG	Ron Healey
--	GK	NIR	Bill Irwin
--	DF	WAL	Bryan Attley
--	DF	ENG	Clive Charles
--	DF	WAL	Phil Dwyer
--	DF	NIR	Albert Larmour
--	DF	WAL	Freddie Pethard
--	DF	WAL	Keith Pontin
--	DF	WAL	Rod Thomas
--	DF	ENG	Paul Went
--	MF	SCO	John Buchanan

No.	Pos.	Nation	Player
--	MF	SCO	Gerry Byrne
--	MF	SCO	Alan Campbell
--	MF	WAL	David Giles
--	MF	ENG	Steve Grapes
--	MF	ENG	Doug Livermore
--	MF	ENG	Keith Robson
--	MF	WAL	Peter Sayer
--	FW	WAL	Ray Bishop
--	FW	ENG	Tony Evans
--	FW	ENG	Robin Friday
--	FW	WAL	Chris Williams

== League standings ==
Pos	Team	Pld	W	D	L	GF	GA	GD	Pts	Relegation
17	Charlton Athletic	42	13	12	17	55	68	−13	38	
18	Bristol Rovers	42	13	12	17	61	77	−16	38	
19	Cardiff City	42	13	12	17	51	71	−20	38	
20	Blackpool (R)	42	12	13	17	59	60	−1	37	Relegation to the Third Division
21	Mansfield Town (R)	42	10	11	21	49	69	−20	31	Relegation to the Third Division

Rules for classification: 1) Points; 2) Goal difference; 3) Goals scored
(R) Relegated

=== Results by round ===
Round	1	2	3	4	5	6	7	8	9	10	11	12	13	14	15	16	17	18	19	20	21	22	23	24	25	26	27	28	29	30	31	32	33	34	35	36	37	38	39	40	41	42
Ground	H	A	H	A	H	H	A	A	H	A	H	A	H	A	H	A	H	A	H	A	H	H	A	H	A	H	A	H	A	A	A	H	A	H	A	A	H	A	H	A	H	H
Result	D	L	D	D	D	W	L	D	L	L	W	L	W	L	W	L	L	L	D	L	W	W	L	D	L	W	D	W	L	L	D	W	D	W	L	D	D	L	W	W	W	L
Position	12	19	20	18	18	14	18	17	19	20	19	20	18	20	16	19	20	20	20	21	20	19	19	19	19	18	18	18	19	19	19	18	18	18	18	18	18	18	18	19	18	19
Points	1	1	2	3	4	6	6	7	7	7	9	9	11	11	13	13	13	13	14	14	16	18	18	19	19	21	22	24	24	24	25	27	28	30	30	31	32	32	34	36	38	38

A = Away; H = Home; W = Win; D = Draw; L = Loss

== Fixtures and results ==
=== Second Division ===
20 August 1977 1	Cardiff City	1–1	Bristol Rovers	Cardiff
15:00	Paul Went 66'		47' Paul Randall	Stadium: Ninian Park; Attendance: 7,603; Referee: Derek Lloyd (Worcester)

27 August 1977 2	Blackburn Rovers	3–0	Cardiff City	Blackburn
15:00	Jack Lewis 20'; Stuart Metcalfe 44'; Noel Brotherston 74'			Stadium: Ewood Park; Attendance: 7,088; Referee: Trelford Mills (Barnsley)

3 September 1977 3	Cardiff City	0–0	Tottenham Hotspur	Cardiff
15:00				Stadium: Ninian Park; Attendance: 8,901; Referee: Lester Shapter (Paignton)

10 September 1977 4	Notts County	1–1	Cardiff City	Nottingham
	Ray O'Brien 35'		70' Phil Dwyer	Stadium: Meadow Lane; Attendance: 7,330; Referee: Ken Burns (Stourbridge)

17 September 1977 5	Cardiff City	1–1	Mansfield Town	Cardiff
15:00	Keith Robson 86'		78' Ernie Moss	Stadium: Ninian Park; Attendance: 6,896; Referee: Dennis Smith (Hornchurch, Essex)

24 September 1977 6	Cardiff City	3–1	Fulham	Cardiff
15:00	Keith Robson 17'; Tony Evans 54'; Tony Evans 67'		74' Teddy Maybank	Stadium: Ninian Park; Attendance: 8,810; Referee: Tony Glasson (Salisbury)

1 October 1977 7	Blackpool	3–0	Cardiff City	Blackpool
	Bob Hatton 5', 50', 88'; Trevor Finnigan (red card)		(red card) Peter Sayer	Stadium: Bloomfield Road; Attendance: 8,704; Referee: Pat Partridge (Middlesbrough)

4 October 1977 8	Sunderland	1–1	Cardiff City	Sunderland
	Roy Greenwood 61'		20' Doug Livermore	Stadium: Roker Park; Attendance: 18,484; Referee: Keith Hackett (Sheffield)

8 October 1977 9	Cardiff City	1–4	Luton Town	Cardiff
15:00	Phil Dwyer 43'	Luton report	25' (o.g.) Gerry Byrne; 55' Lil Fuccillo; 83' Ron Futcher; 89' Ricky Hill	Stadium: Ninian Park; Attendance: 8,276; Referee: Trevor Spencer (Wootton Bassett)

15 October 1977 10	Orient	2–1	Cardiff City	London
15:00	Peter Kitchen 8', 89'		24' Steve Grapes	Stadium: Brisbane Road; Attendance: 5,444; Referee: Colin Downey (Hounslow)

22 October 1977 11	Cardiff City	1–0	Oldham Athletic	Cardiff
15:00	Paul Went 3'			Stadium: Ninian Park; Attendance: 6,910; Referee: Leslie Burden (Dorset)

29 October 1977 12	Brighton & Hove Albion	4–0	Cardiff City	Brighton
15:00	Peter O'Sullivan 24'; Ian Mellor 26'; Peter Ward 70'; Peter O'Sullivan 75'		(red card) Robin Friday	Stadium: Goldstone Ground; Attendance: 22,704; Referee: Alan Robinson (Fareham)

5 November 1977 13	Cardiff City	2–0	Stoke City	Cardiff
14:45	Phil Dwyer 42'; Peter Sayer 60'			Stadium: Ninian Park; Attendance: 8,428; Referee: Derek Nippard (Bournemouth)

12 November 1977 14	Hull City	4–1	Cardiff City	Hull
14:15	Dave Stewart 1'; Alan Warboys 4'; Ian Dobson 31'; Dave Stewart 52'		8' (pen.) Peter Sayer	Stadium: Boothferry Park; Attendance: 5,228

19 November 1977 15	Cardiff City	2–1	Burnley	Cardiff
14:30	Phil Dwyer 3'; Peter Sayer 67' (pen.)		27' Paul Fletcher	Stadium: Ninian Park; Attendance: 7,085; Referee: Clive White (Harrow)

26 November 1977 16	Crystal Palace	2–0	Cardiff City	London
	Nick Chatterton 28' (pen.); Steve Perrin 90'			Stadium: Selhurst Park; Attendance: 16,139; Referee: Allan Gunn (Burgess Hill)

3 December 1977 17	Cardiff City	1–6	Sheffield United	Cardiff
14:15	John Buchanan 90'		25' Cliff Calvert; Bobby Campbell; 43' Bobby Campbell; 53' Tony Kenworthy; 56' Ian Hamilton; 88' Alan Woodward	Stadium: Ninian Park; Attendance: 6,409; Referee: Alex Hamil (Wolverhampton)

10 December 1977 18	Bolton Wanderers	6–3	Cardiff City	Bolton
15:00	Paul Jones 17'; Paul Jones 22'; Peter Reid 30'; Mike Walsh 53'; Neil Whatmore 75'; Willie Morgan 83'		13' Keith Robson; 44' Peter Sayer; 86' Ray Bishop	Stadium: Burnden Park; Attendance: 16,090

17 December 1977 19	Cardiff City	0–0	Hull City	Cardiff
14:15				Stadium: Ninian Park; Attendance: 5,675; Referee: Derek Civil (Birmingham)

26 December 1977 20	Southampton	3–1	Cardiff City	Southampton
11:30	Ted MacDougall 1'; Alan Ball 52'; Phil Boyer		Keith Robson	Stadium: The Dell; Attendance: 21,681

28 December 1977 21	Cardiff City	4–1	Millwall	Cardiff
14:30	Ray Bishop 2'; John Buchanan 22'; Keith Robson 49'; John Buchanan 61'		90' (pen.) Terry Brisley	Stadium: Ninian Park; Attendance: 8,272; Referee: Dennis Turner (Cannock)

31 December 1977 22	Cardiff City	1–0	Charlton Athletic	Cardiff
14:30	Les Berry 25' (o.g.)			Stadium: Ninian Park; Attendance: 8,488; Referee: Ron Crabb (Exeter)

2 January 1978 23	Bristol Rovers	3–2	Cardiff City	Bristol
19:30	David Staniforth 82'; David Staniforth 84'; Paul Randall 90'		20' David Giles; 93' Keith Pontin	Stadium: Eastville; Attendance: 11,945

14 January 1978 24	Cardiff City	1–1	Blackburn Rovers	Cardiff
14:45	Ray Bishop 35'		8' Stuart Metcalfe	Stadium: Ninian Park; Attendance: 6,949

21 January 1978 25	Tottenham Hotspur	2–1	Cardiff City	London
15:00	John Duncan 34'; John Duncan 58'		80' Paul Went	Stadium: White Hart Lane; Attendance: 29,106; Referee: Tom Bune (Sussex)

28 January 1978 26	Cardiff City	5–2	Sunderland	Cardiff
15:00	John Buchanan 9'; John Buchanan 13' (pen.); Paul Went 40'; Ray Bishop 49'; Paul Went 80'		35' Clarke; 77' (pen.) Gary Rowell	Stadium: Ninian Park; Attendance: 8,459; Referee: Derek Lloyd (Fernhill Heath, Worcester)

11 February 1978 27	Mansfield Town	2–2	Cardiff City	Mansfield
15:00	Ian Wood 35'; Gordon Hodgson 88'		18' Ray Bishop; 27' John Buchanan	Stadium: Field Mill; Attendance: 6,538

25 February 1978 28	Cardiff City	2–1	Blackpool	Cardiff
15:00	Paul Went 21'; Steve Grapes 88'		41' David Tong	Stadium: Ninian Park; Attendance: 7,322; Referee: Edward (EO) Hughes (Weston Super Mare)

4 March 1978 29	Luton Town	3–1	Cardiff City	Luton
15:00	Phil Boersma 11'; John Faulkner 34'; Phil Boersma 80'	Luton report	27' John Buchanan	Stadium: Kenilworth Road; Attendance: 6,029; Referee: Brian Martin (Keyworth, Nottingham)

7 March 1978 30	Fulham	1–0	Cardiff City	London
19:30	Tony Gale 5'			Stadium: Craven Cottage; Attendance: 6,571; Referee: Alex Hamil (Wolverhampton)

18 March 1978 31	Oldham Athletic	1–1	Cardiff City	Oldham
15:00	Steve Taylor 85'		41' Paul Went	Stadium: Boundary Park; Attendance: 7,578; Referee: John Hunting (Leicester)

24 March 1978 32	Cardiff City	1–0	Brighton & Hove Albion	Cardiff
15:00	John Buchanan 72' (pen.)			Stadium: Ninian Park; Attendance: 10,222; Referee: Peter Reeves (Leicester)

25 March 1978 33	Millwall	1–1	Cardiff City	London
15:00	Dave Mehmet 77'		27' Ray Bishop	Stadium: The Den; Attendance: 5,943; Referee: BH Daniels (Rainham)

29 March 1978 34	Cardiff City	1–0	Southampton	Cardiff
18:00	Ray Bishop 13'			Stadium: Ninian Park; Attendance: 11,359; Referee: Malcolm Sinclair (Guildford)

1 April 1978 35	Stoke City	2–0	Cardiff City	Stoke
	Steve Waddington 6'; Brendan O'Callaghan 32'			Stadium: Victoria Ground; Attendance: 14,804; Referee: George Flint (Kirby in Ashfield)

4 April 1978 36	Charlton Athletic	0–0	Cardiff City	London
19:30				Stadium: The Valley; Attendance: 8,947

8 April 1978 37	Cardiff City	2–2	Crystal Palace	Cardiff
15:00	Phil Dwyer 43'; Phil Dwyer 56'		60' (pen.) Nick Chatterton; 80' Rachid Harkouk	Stadium: Ninian Park; Attendance: 9,328; Referee: Stephen Bates (Bristol)

15 April 1978 38	Burnley	4–2	Cardiff City	Burnley
15:00	Billy Ingham 9'; Steve Kindon 37', 62'; Paul Fletcher 82'		8' John Buchanan; 44' Tony Evans	Stadium: Turf Moor; Attendance: 11,577; Referee: David Richardson (Lancashire)

22 April 1978 39	Cardiff City	1–0	Bolton Wanderers	Cardiff
15:00	Ray Bishop 85'			Stadium: Ninian Park; Attendance: 12,566

29 April 1978 40	Sheffield United	0–1	Cardiff City	Sheffield
15:00			89' Tony Evans	Stadium: Bramall Lane; Attendance: 13,687

3 May 1978 41	Cardiff City	2–1	Notts County	Cardiff
19:00	John Buchanan 48'; Paul Went 78'		41' Ray O'Brien	Stadium: Ninian Park; Attendance: 9,528; Referee: Brian Stevens (Stonehouse)

9 May 1978 42	Cardiff City	0–1	Orient	Cardiff
19:00			35' Peter Kitchen	Stadium: Ninian Park; Attendance: 8,270; Referee: Don Biddle (Bristol)

=== League Cup ===
13 August 1977 Round 1 (First Leg)	Torquay United	1–0	Cardiff City	Torquay
	Doug Livermore (??)			Stadium: Plainmoor; Attendance: 3,925; Referee: Alex Lees (Somerset)

17 August 1977 Round 1 (Second Leg)	Cardiff City	3–2 (3–3 agg.)	Torquay United	Cardiff
18:45	David Giles 32'; Peter Sayer 57'; Phil Dwyer		5' Colin Lee; 44' Willie Brown	Stadium: Ninian Park; Attendance: 2,509; Referee: Brian Stevens (Stonehouse)

24 August 1977 Round 1 (Replay)	Cardiff City	2–1	Torquay United	Cardiff
18:00	Peter Sayer 62' (pen.); John Buchanan 72'		36' Les Lawrence	Stadium: Ninian Park; Attendance: 1,711; Referee: Edward Hughes (Weston)

30 August 1977 Round 2	Swindon Town	5–1	Cardiff City	Swindon
	Chris Guthrie 32'; Trevor Anderson 60'; Trevor Anderson 65'; David Moss 88'; Ray McHale 89'		70' John Buchanan	Stadium: County Ground; Attendance: 8,919; Referee: Ken Salmon (Barnet)

=== FA Cup ===
7 January 1978 Round 3	Cardiff City	0–2	Ipswich Town	Cardiff
14:30			49' Paul Mariner; 73' Paul Mariner	Stadium: Ninian Park; Attendance: 13,584; Referee: Jim Bent (Hemel Hempstead)

=== European Cup Winners Cup ===
14 September 1977 Round 1 (First Leg)	Cardiff City	0–0	Austria Memphis	Cardiff
17:00				Stadium: Ninian Park; Attendance: 3,631; Referee: Ulf Eriksson (Sweden)

28 September 1977 Round 1 (Second Leg)	Austria Memphis	1–0 (1–0 agg.)	Cardiff City	Vienna
	Ernst Baumeister 53'			Stadium: Gerhard Hanappi Stadium; Attendance: 8,000; Referee: M Kuston (Poland)

=== Welsh Cup ===
21 December 1977 Round 5	Worcester City	2–2	Cardiff City	Worcester
	Roger Shaw 12'; Roger Shaw 48'		30' (pen.) Paul Went; 71' Ray Bishop	Stadium: St George's Lane; Attendance: 2,915

11 January 1978 Round 5 (Replay)	Cardiff City	3–0	Worcester City	Cardiff
13:45	Ray Bishop 17'; Keith Robson 43'; John Barton 80' (o.g.)			Stadium: Ninian Park; Attendance: 963; Referee: Tom Reynolds (Swansea)

1 March 1978 Round 6	Cardiff City	1–1	Kidderminster Harriers	Cardiff
	John Buchanan		31' Ray Haywood	Stadium: Ninian Park; Attendance: 1,639; Referee: Keith Cooper (Pontypridd)

15 March 1978 Round 6 (Replay)	Kidderminster Harriers	1–3 (a.e.t.)	Cardiff City	Kidderminster
	John Griffiths 86'		28' David Giles; 119' David Giles; 95' (pen.) John Buchanan	Stadium: Aggborough Stadium; Attendance: 3,000

13 April 1978 Semi Final	Cardiff City	0–2	Wrexham	Cardiff
18:30		Wrexham report	2' Les Cartwright; 87' Alan Dwyer	Stadium: Ninian Park; Attendance: 8,928; Referee: Tom Reynolds (Swansea)

== See also ==
- Cardiff City F.C. seasons

== Bibliography ==
- Hayes, Dean (2006). The Who's Who of Cardiff City. Breedon Books. ISBN 1-85983-462-0.
- Crooks, John (1986). Cardiff City Chronology 1920-86. John Crooks. ISBN 0-9511984-0-8.
- Crooks, John (1992). Cardiff City Football Club: Official History of the Bluebirds. Yore Publications. ISBN 0-9513321-8-X.
- Shepherd, Richard (2002). The Definitive Cardiff City F.C. Tony Brown. ISBN 1-899-46817-X.
