= 1980–81 Cardiff City F.C. season =

Welsh football club season

Cardiff City
1980–81 season
- Chairman: Bob Grogan
- Manager: Richie Morgan
- Football League Second Division: 19th
- FA Cup: 3rd round
- League Cup: 3rd round
- Welsh Cup: 4th round
- Top goalscorer: League: Peter Kitchen (13); All: Peter Kitchen (19)
- Highest home attendance: 21,239 (v Swansea City, 27 December 1980)
- Lowest home attendance: 4,059 (v Cambridge United, 17 October 1980)
- Average home league attendance: 6,770
Home colours

The 1980–81 season was Cardiff City F.C.'s 54th season in the Football League. They competed in the 22-team Division Two, then the second tier of English football, finishing nineteenth.

== Players ==
Note: Flags indicate national team as defined under FIFA eligibility rules; some limited exceptions apply. Players may hold more than one non-FIFA nationality.

Pos.	Nation	Player
GK	ENG	Peter Grotier
GK	ENG	Ron Healey
DF	WAL	Phil Dwyer
DF	ENG	Tim Gilbert
DF	WAL	Linden Jones
DF	WAL	Keith Pontin
DF	WAL	David Roberts
DF	ENG	Colin Sullivan
DF	WAL	Rod Thomas
MF	SCO	John Buchanan
MF	SCO	Alan Campbell
MF	IRL	Miah Dennehy

Pos.	Nation	Player
MF	WAL	Paul Giles
MF	ENG	Steve Grapes
MF	WAL	Wayne Hughes
MF	WAL	John Lewis
MF	WAL	Paul Maddy
MF	WAL	Tarki Micallef
MF	ENG	Billy Ronson
FW	WAL	Ray Bishop
FW	ENG	Paul Davies
FW	ENG	Peter Kitchen
FW	ENG	Gary Stevens

== League standings ==
Pos	Team	Pld	W	D	L	GF	GA	GD	Pts	Qualification or relegation
17	Orient	42	13	12	17	52	56	−4	38	
18	Bolton Wanderers	42	14	10	18	61	66	−5	38	
19	Cardiff City	42	12	12	18	44	60	−16	36	
20	Preston North End (R)	42	11	14	17	41	62	−21	36	Relegation to the Third Division
21	Bristol City (R)	42	7	16	19	29	51	−22	30	Relegation to the Third Division

Rules for classification: 1) Points; 2) Goal difference; 3) Goals scored
(R) Relegated

=== Results by round ===
Round	1	2	3	4	5	6	7	8	9	10	11	12	13	14	15	16	17	18	19	20	21	22	23	24	25	26	27	28	29	30	31	32	33	34	35	36	37	38	39	40	41	42
Ground	H	A	A	H	A	H	H	A	H	A	A	H	H	A	H	A	H	A	H	A	H	A	H	A	A	H	A	A	H	H	A	H	A	A	H	A	H	A	H	A	H	H
Result	L	W	L	W	L	D	W	L	W	L	L	L	W	L	L	L	W	W	W	D	D	D	D	D	D	L	L	L	L	W	W	D	L	L	D	W	L	D	L	W	D	D
Position	~	~	19	19	19	16	15	16	11	14	16	17	17	18	19	21	20	15	14	14	15	18	17	17	16	18	18	19	20	17	17	17	17	19	19	19	19	20	20	19	19	19
Points	0	2	2	4	4	5	7	7	9	9	9	9	11	11	11	11	13	15	17	18	19	20	21	22	23	23	23	23	23	25	27	28	28	28	29	31	31	32	32	34	35	36

A = Away; H = Home; W = Win; D = Draw; L = Loss

== Fixtures and results ==
=== Second Division ===
16 August 1980 1	Cardiff City	1–2	Blackburn Rovers	Cardiff
15:00	Gary Stevens		Noel Brotherston; Andy Crawford	Stadium: Ninian Park; Attendance: 6,908; Referee: Derek Civil (Birmingham)

19 August 1980 2	Wrexham	0–1	Cardiff City	Wrexham
19:30		Wrexham report	68' Ray Bishop	Stadium: Racecourse; Attendance: 7,772; Referee: MR Baker (Wolverhampton)

23 August 1980 3	Oldham Athletic	2–0	Cardiff City	Oldham
15:00	Ryszard Kowenicki 81'; Simon Stainrod 86'			Stadium: Boundary Park; Attendance: 5,690; Referee: Terry Farley (Newton Aycliffe)

30 August 1980 4	Cardiff City	4–2	Orient	Cardiff
15:00	Gary Stevens 8'; Phil Dwyer 40'; Gary Stevens 52'; John Buchanan 55'		13' Steve Parsons; 44' Billy Jennings	Stadium: Ninian Park; Attendance: 5,649; Referee: Malcolm Heath (Stoke)

6 September 1980 5	Newcastle United	2–1	Cardiff City	Newcastle
	Ray Clarke 19'; Alan Shoulder 32' (pen.)		50' Peter Kitchen	Stadium: St James' Park; Attendance: 15,804; Referee: Alan Seville (Birmingham)

13 September 1980 6	Cardiff City	1–1	Bolton Wanderers	Cardiff
15:00	Gary Stevens 45'		Mick Walsh	Stadium: Ninian Park; Attendance: 6,649; Referee: Mike Bidmead (Chessington)

20 September 1980 7	Cardiff City	2–1	Bristol Rovers	Cardiff
19:30	Billy Ronson 40'; Keith Pontin 62'		35' Bob Lee	Stadium: Ninian Park; Attendance: 6,122; Referee: Alex Hamil (Wolverhampton)

27 September 1980 8	Notts County	4–2	Cardiff City	Nottingham
	Eddie Kelly 28'; Iain McCulloch; Ray O'Brien 64' (pen.); Iain McCulloch		22' Phil Dwyer; Peter Kitchen	Stadium: Meadow Lane; Attendance: 7,229

4 October 1980 9	Cardiff City	1–0	Watford	Cardiff
15:00	Tarki Micallef 8'			Stadium: Ninian Park; Attendance: 6,407

7 October 1980 10	West Ham United	1–0	Cardiff City	London
19:30	Jimmy Neighbour 50'			Stadium: Upton Park; Attendance: 20,402

11 October 1980 11	Sheffield Wednesday	2–0	Cardiff City	Sheffield
	Brian Hornsby 35'; Andy McCulloch 80'			Stadium: Hillsborough; Attendance: 15,396

17 October 1980 12	Cardiff City	1–2	Cambridge United	Cardiff
19:30	Lindsay Smith (o.g.)		63' John Lyons; 70' Steve Spriggs	Stadium: Ninian Park; Attendance: 4,059

22 October 1980 13	Cardiff City	1–0	Queens Park Rangers	Cardiff
19:30	Steve Grapes 19'			Stadium: Ninian Park; Attendance: 4,489; Referee: Brian Stevens (Stonehouse)

25 October 1980 14	Shrewsbury Town	2–0	Cardiff City	Shrewsbury
	Jack Keay 54' (pen.); Steve Biggins 78'			Stadium: Gay Meadow; Attendance: 4,466

31 October 1980 15	Cardiff City	0–1	Chelsea	Cardiff
19:30			37' Chris Hutchings	Stadium: Ninian Park; Attendance: 8,489; Referee: Lester Shapter (Paignton)

8 November 1980 16	Preston North End	3–1	Cardiff City	Preston
	Mick Baxter; Alex Bruce; Gary Stevens (o.g.)		36' Peter Kitchen	Stadium: Deepdale; Attendance: 5,458

12 November 1980 17	Cardiff City	1–0	Wrexham	Cardiff
19:30	Peter Kitchen 50' (pen.)	Wrexham report	(red card) 51' Joey Jones	Stadium: Ninian Park; Attendance: 4,562; Referee: Colin Downey (Hounslow)

15 November 1980 18	Blackburn Rovers	2–3	Cardiff City	Blackburn
15:00	Kevin Stonehouse 75' (pen.); Glenn Keeley 84'		Peter Kitchen; 54' Peter Kitchen; 90' John Buchanan	Stadium: Ewood Park; Attendance: 7,854

22 November 1980 19	Cardiff City	1–0	Luton Town	Cardiff
15:00	John Buchanan 53'	Luton report		Stadium: Ninian Park; Attendance: 6,064; Referee: Maurice Robinson (Sutton Colefield)

29 November 1980 20	Derby	1–1	Cardiff City	Derby
	Kevin Wilson 64'		75' (o.g.) Jonathan Clark	Stadium: Baseball Ground; Attendance: 15,581

6 December 1980 21	Cardiff City	1–1	Grimsby Town	Cardiff
15:00	Peter Kitchen 55' (pen.)		11' (pen.) Joe Waters	Stadium: Ninian Park; Attendance: 6,063; Referee: Mike Warner (Wednesbury)

26 December 1980 22	Bristol City	0–0	Cardiff City	Bristol
				Stadium: Ashton Gate; Attendance: 14,921; Referee: Ray Lewis (Great Bookham, Surrey)

27 December 1980 23	Cardiff City	3–3	Swansea	Cardiff
15:00	Gary Stevens 12'; Peter Kitchen 85'; John Buchanan 86'		38' Neil Robinson; 40' Alan Curtis; 73' Leighton James	Stadium: Ninian Park; Attendance: 21,239; Referee: Jeff Bray (Hinckley)

10 January 1981 24	Luton Town	2–2	Cardiff City	Luton
15:00	David Moss 24'; Brian Stein 64'	Luton report	8' Peter Kitchen; 46' Paul Giles	Stadium: Kenilworth Road; Attendance: 9,013; Referee: David Hutchinson (Harrogate)

17 January 1981 25	Orient	2–2	Cardiff City	London
15:00	Joe Mayo 52'; Nigel Gray 80'		51' Paul Maddy; 61' Paul Maddy	Stadium: Brisbane Road; Attendance: 3,836; Referee: Ray Toseland (Kettering)

31 January 1981 26	Cardiff City	0–2	Oldham Athletic	Cardiff
15:00			10' Roger Palmer; 86' Martin Nuttall	Stadium: Ninian Park; Attendance: 5,563; Referee: Dennis Hedges (Oxford)

3 February 1981 27	Queens Park Rangers	2–0	Cardiff City	London
19:30	Terry Fenwick 49'; Tommy Langley 62'			Stadium: Loftus Road; Attendance: 9,834; Referee: Tom Bune (Sussex)

7 February 1981 28	Bolton Wanderers	4–2	Cardiff City	Bolton
15:00	John Thomas 40'; John Thomas 52'; Phillip Wilson 61'; Dušan Nikolić 74'		2' John Buchanan; 78' John Buchanan	Stadium: Burnden Park; Attendance: 8,115; Referee: Michael Lowe (Sheffield)

20 February 1981 29	Cardiff City	0–1	Notts County	Cardiff
19:30			86' Trevor Christie	Stadium: Ninian Park; Attendance: 4,987; Referee: Alan Robinson (Fareham)

25 February 1981 30	Cardiff City	1–0	Newcastle United	Cardiff
19:30	Peter Kitchen 32'			Stadium: Ninian Park; Attendance: 4,235

28 February 1981 31	Bristol Rovers	0–1	Cardiff City	Bristol
15:00			20' Steve Grapes	Stadium: Eastville; Attendance: 7,525; Referee: Brian Hill (Kettering)

4 March 1981 32	Cardiff City	0–0	Sheffield Wednesday	Cardiff
19:30				Stadium: Ninian Park; Attendance: 7,002; Referee: John Hunting (Leicester)

7 March 1981 33	Watford	4–2	Cardiff City	London
15:00	Malcolm Poskett 36'; Luther Blissett 45'; Keith Pritchett 59'; Malcolm Poskett 70'		21' Peter Kitchen; 53' Linden Jones	Stadium: Vicarage Road; Attendance: 10,014

21 March 1981 34	Cambridge United	2–0	Cardiff City	Cambridge
15:00	George Reilly 7'; Derrick Christie 86'			Stadium: Abbey Stadium; Attendance: 3,790; Referee: Danny Vickers (Essex)

28 March 1981 35	Cardiff City	2–2	Shrewsbury Town	Cardiff
15:00	John Lewis; Phil Dwyer		(pen.) Jack Keay; Ian Atkins	Stadium: Ninian Park; Attendance: 5,201; Referee: David Letts (Basingstoke)

4 April 1981 36	Chelsea	0–1	Cardiff City	London
			47' Gary Stevens	Stadium: Stamford Bridge; Attendance: 11,569; Referee: Brian Martin (Keyworth, Nottingham)

11 April 1981 37	Cardiff City	1–3	Preston North End	Cardiff
15:00	Phil Dwyer 35'		47' Sean Haslegrave; 50' Alex Bruce; 84' Stephen Elliott	Stadium: Ninian Park; Attendance: 4,991; Referee: Brian Stevens (Stonehouse)

18 April 1981 38	Swansea	1–1	Cardiff City	Swansea
15:00	Leighton James 43'		Peter Kitchen	Stadium: Vetch Field; Attendance: 19,038; Referee: Derek Civil (Birmingham)

20 April 1981 39	Cardiff City	2–3	Bristol City	Cardiff
15:00	Steve Grapes 2'; Peter Kitchen		Gary Mabbutt; James Mann; 89' James Mann	Stadium: Ninian Park; Attendance: 5,579; Referee: Morris Baker (Wolverhampton)

25 April 1981 40	Grimsby Town	0–1	Cardiff City	Grimsby
15:00			5' Gary Stevens	Stadium: Blundell Park; Attendance: 7,377

2 May 1981 41	Cardiff City	0–0	Derby	Cardiff
15:00				Stadium: Ninian Park; Attendance: 7,377; Referee: Leslie Burden (Dorset)

6 May 1981 42	Cardiff City	0–0	West Ham United	Cardiff
19:30				Stadium: Ninian Park; Attendance: 10,535; Referee: Peter Reeves (Leicester)

=== League Cup ===
9 August 1980 Round 1 (First Leg)	Torquay United	0–0	Cardiff City	Torquay
15:00				Stadium: Plainmoor; Attendance: 3,441; Referee: A Robinson

13 August 1980 Round 1 (Second Leg)	Cardiff City	2–1 (2–1 agg.)	Torquay United	Cardiff
19:30	Ray Bishop 57'; Gary Stevens 70'		58' Gerry Fell	Stadium: Ninian Park; Attendance: 3,149; Referee: TD Spencer (Salisbury)

27 August 1980 Round 2 (First Leg)	Cardiff City	1–0	Chelsea	Cardiff
19:30	Ray Bishop 44'			Stadium: Ninian Park; Attendance: 6,549; Referee: Tony Glasson (Salisbury)

3 September 1980 Round 2 (Second Leg)	Chelsea	1–1 (1–2 agg.)	Cardiff City	London
19:45	Micky Droy		84' Peter Kitchen	Stadium: Stamford Bridge; Attendance: 12,959; Referee: Mike J Taylor (Walmer)

23 September 1980 Round 3	Barnsley	3–2	Cardiff City	Barnsley
	Ronnie Glavin (pen.); Derrick Parker; Ian Banks 90'		John Buchanan; 88' John Lewis	Stadium: Oakwell; Attendance: 13,135; Referee: Kevin McNally

=== FA Cup ===
3 January 1981 Round 3	Leicester City	3–0	Cardiff City	Leicester
15:00	Gary Lineker 30'; David Buchanan 51'; Jim Melrose 80'			Stadium: Filbert Street; Attendance: 17,527; Referee: Darryl Reeves (Uxbridge)

=== Welsh Cup ===
3 December 1980 Round 3	Cardiff City	6–0	Cardiff Corinthians	Cardiff
19:30	Peter Kitchen 12', 42', 61', 75', 82'; Wayne Hughes 53'			Stadium: Ninian Park; Attendance: 1,080; Referee: EG Morgan (Troedyrhiw)

27 January 1981 Round 4	Wrexham	3–0	Cardiff City	Wrexham
19:30	Steve Fox 31', 55'; Dixie McNeil 63'	Wrexham report		Stadium: The Racecourse; Attendance: 4,880; Referee: Howard King (Merthyr Tydfil)

== See also ==
- Cardiff City F.C. seasons

== Bibliography ==
- Hayes, Dean (2006). The Who's Who of Cardiff City. Breedon Books. ISBN 1-85983-462-0.
- Crooks, John (1986). Cardiff City Chronology 1920-86. John Crooks. ISBN 0-9511984-0-8.
- Shepherd, Richard (2002). The Definitive Cardiff City F.C. Tony Brown. ISBN 1-899-46817-X.
- Crooks, John (1992). Cardiff City Football Club: Official History of the Bluebirds. Yore Publications. ISBN 0-9513321-8-X.
- "Football Club History Database – Cardiff City". Archived from the original on 30 December 2008.
- Welsh Football Data Archive
