= 1976–77 Cardiff City F.C. season =

Welsh football club season

Cardiff City
1976–77 season
- Chairman: Stefan Terlezki
- Manager: Jimmy Andrews
- Football League Second Division: 18th
- FA Cup: 5th round
- League Cup: 2nd round
- European Cup Winners Cup: 1st round
- Welsh Cup: Winners
- Top goalscorer: League: Tony Evans (15); All: Tony Evans (24)
- Highest home attendance: 20,368 (v Fulham, 1 January 1977)
- Lowest home attendance: 8,310 (v Hull City, 11 December 1976)
- Average home league attendance: 12,691
Home colours

The 1976–77 season was Cardiff City F.C.'s 50th season in the Football League. They competed in the 22-team Division Two, then the second tier of English football, finishing eighteenth.

The season also saw the arrival of Robin Friday who, although it would be his only full season at the club, made such an impression that he was voted as the club's all-time cult hero.

== Players ==
Note: Flags indicate national team as defined under FIFA eligibility rules; some limited exceptions apply. Players may hold more than one non-FIFA nationality.

No.	Pos.	Nation	Player
--	GK	ENG	Ron Healey
--	GK	NIR	Bill Irwin
--	DF	WAL	Bryan Attley
--	DF	ENG	Clive Charles
--	DF	WAL	Phil Dwyer
--	DF	NIR	Albert Larmour
--	DF	WAL	Richie Morgan
--	DF	WAL	Freddie Pethard
--	DF	WAL	Keith Pontin
--	DF	ENG	Paul Went
--	MF	ENG	Willie Anderson

No.	Pos.	Nation	Player
--	MF	SCO	John Buchanan
--	MF	SCO	Alan Campbell
--	MF	WAL	David Giles
--	MF	ENG	Steve Grapes
--	MF	ENG	Doug Livermore
--	MF	WAL	Peter Sayer
--	FW	AUS	Adrian Alston
--	FW	ENG	Tony Evans
--	FW	ENG	Robin Friday
--	FW	WAL	Derek Showers

Source.

== League standings ==
Pos	Team	Pld	W	D	L	GF	GA	GD	Pts	Qualification or relegation
16	Burnley	42	11	14	17	46	64	−18	36	
17	Fulham	42	11	13	18	54	61	−7	35	
18	Cardiff City	42	12	10	20	56	67	−11	34	Qualification for the Cup Winners' Cup first round
19	Orient	42	9	16	17	37	55	−18	34	
20	Carlisle United (R)	42	11	12	19	49	75	−26	34	Relegation to the Third Division

Rules for classification: 1) Points; 2) Goal difference; 3) Goals scored
(R) Relegated

=== Results by round ===
Round	1	2	3	4	5	6	7	8	9	10	11	12	13	14	15	16	17	18	19	20	21	22	23	24	25	26	27	28	29	30	31	32	33	34	35	36	37	38	39	40	41	42
Ground	A	H	H	A	H	A	H	A	H	A	H	H	A	H	A	H	A	H	A	H	H	A	H	A	H	A	H	A	A	H	H	A	A	H	A	H	A	A	H	A	A	H
Result	W	L	W	L	L	L	D	L	W	D	D	L	W	W	L	L	D	D	L	W	W	D	D	L	W	L	L	W	L	L	L	L	D	D	L	W	W	L	L	W	L	D
Position	3		5	11	17	19	19	20	19	20	19	20	19	13	16	17	18	17	18	17	14	11	14	16	14	15	16	14	15	16	19	19	18	19	20	19	17	17	21	18	18	18
Points	2	2	4	4	4	4	5	5	7	8	9	9	11	13	13	13	14	15	15	17	19	20	21	21	23	23	23	25	25	25	25	25	26	27	27	29	31	31	31	33	33	34

Source: Competitive matches
A = Away; H = Home; W = Win; D = Draw; L = Loss

== Fixtures and results ==
=== Second Division ===
21 August 1976 1	Charlton Athletic	0–2	Cardiff City	London
15:00			59' Derek Showers; 65' Derek Showers	Stadium: The Valley; Attendance: 9,762; Referee: Alan Robinson (Fareham)

25 August 1976 2	Cardiff City	1–2	Bristol Rovers	Cardiff
19:30	Clive Charles 77' (pen.)		29' Alan Warboys; 49' Bruce Bannister	Stadium: Ninian Park; Attendance: 12,680; Referee: Leslie Burden (Dorset)

28 August 1976 3	Cardiff City	2–1	Blackburn Rovers	Cardiff
15:00	Adrian Alston 60'; Derek Showers 71'		82' Bob Mitchell	Stadium: Ninian Park; Attendance: 11,871; Referee: Lester Shapter (Paignton)

4 September 1976 4	Oldham Athletic	3–2	Cardiff City	Oldham
15:00	David Irving 11'; David Shaw 25'; David Shaw 34'		8' Tony Evans; 47' Doug Livermore	Stadium: Boundary Park; Attendance: 8,503; Referee: Brian Martin (Keyworth, Nottingham)

11 September 1976 5	Cardiff City	2–3	Notts County	Cardiff
15:00	Derek Showers 64'; John Buchanan 85'		79' David Needham; 81' Mick Vinter; 87' Mick Vinter	Stadium: Ninian Park; Attendance: 11,988; Referee: Ken Burns (Stourbridge)

18 September 1976 6	Orient	3–0	Cardiff City	London
15:00	Laurie Cunningham 22'; Laurie Cunningham 44'; Alan Whittle 77'			Stadium: Brisbane Road; Attendance: 5,743; Referee: Reg Robinson (Norwich)

24 September 1976 7	Cardiff City	0–0	Millwall	Cardiff
19:30				Stadium: Ninian Park; Attendance: 10,352; Referee: Alex Lees (Somerset)

2 October 1976 8	Chelsea	2–1	Cardiff City	London
15:00	Kenny Swain 6'; Ray Lewington 56'		85' (pen.) Clive Charles	Stadium: Stamford Bridge; Attendance: 28,409; Referee: Brian H Daniels (Rainham)

9 October 1976 9	Cardiff City	3–2	Bolton Wanderers	Cardiff
15:00	Adrian Alston 45' (pen.); John Buchanan 78'; Tony Evans 84'		3' (pen.) Paul Jones; 41' Steve Taylor	Stadium: Ninian Park; Attendance: 11,007; Referee: Don Biddle (Bristol)

16 October 1976 10	Plymouth Argyle	2–2	Cardiff City	Plymouth
	Paul Mariner 6'; Brian Hall 48' (pen.)		10' Tony Evans; 52' Phil Dwyer	Stadium: Home Park; Attendance: 14,198; Referee: Ron Crabb (Exeter)

23 October 1976 11	Cardiff City	2–2	Blackpool	Cardiff
15:00	Tony Evans 28'; Tony Evans 74'		53' Derek Spence; 88' Bob Hatton	Stadium: Ninian Park; Attendance: 12,178; Referee: Derek Lloyd (Worcester)

30 October 1976 12	Cardiff City	0–2	Sheffield United	Cardiff
15:00			50' Simon Stainrod; 60' Simon Stainrod	Stadium: Ninian Park; Attendance: 12,056; Referee: Ken Ridden (Shrewsbury)

6 November 1976 13	Fulham	1–2	Cardiff City	London
15:00	George Best 81'		25' John Buchanan; 63' Tony Evans	Stadium: Craven Cottage; Attendance: 12,336; Referee: Ron Challis (Tonbridge)

10 November 1976 14	Cardiff City	1–0	Southampton	Cardiff
19:30	Phil Dwyer 42'			Stadium: Ninian Park; Attendance: 15,190; Referee: John Yates (Redditch)

20 November 1976 15	Luton Town	2–1	Cardiff City	Luton
15:00	Dixie Deans 6'; Ron Futcher 31'	Luton report	75' Tony Evans	Stadium: Kenilworth Road; Attendance: 8,845; Referee: John Homewood (Sunbury-On-Thames)

27 November 1976 16	Cardiff City	0–3	Nottingham Forest	Cardiff
15:00			(42s) Peter Withe; 43' Sammy Chapman; 87' Tony Woodcock	Stadium: Ninian Park; Attendance: 12,770; Referee: Jack Taylor (Wolverhampton)

4 December 1976 17	Burnley	0–0	Cardiff City	Burnley
15:00				Stadium: Turf Moor; Attendance: 8,959; Referee: Pat Partridge (Middlesbrough)

11 December 1976 18	Cardiff City	1–1	Hull City	Cardiff
15:00	John Buchanan 49'		81' (pen.) Peter Daniel	Stadium: Ninian Park; Attendance: 8,310; Referee: Dennis Turner (Cannock)

18 December 1976 19	Carlisle United	4–3	Cardiff City	Carlisle
15:00	George McVitie 38'; Billy Rafferty 83'; Billy Rafferty 88'; Billy Rafferty 89'		50' Peter Sayer; 54' John Buchanan; 60' Tony Evans	Stadium: Brunton Park; Attendance: 5,934; Referee: Ken Walmsley (Blackpool)

27 December 1976 20	Cardiff City	3–1	Hereford United	Cardiff
15:00	David Giles 39'; Tony Evans 63'; Tony Evans 79'		83' Terry Paine	Stadium: Ninian Park; Attendance: 14,465; Referee: Eric Read (Bristol)

1 January 1977 21	Cardiff City	3–0	Fulham	Cardiff
15:00	John Buchanan 12'; Robin Friday 43'; Robin Friday 67'			Stadium: Ninian Park; Attendance: 20,368; Referee: Morris Baker (Wolverhampton)

15 January 1977 22	Bristol Rovers	1–1	Cardiff City	Bristol
15:00	Alan Warboys 32' (pen.)		57' Tony Evans	Stadium: Eastville; Attendance: 9,272; Referee: Ron Crabb (Exeter)

22 January 1977 23	Cardiff City	1–1	Charlton Athletic	Cardiff
15:00	Paul Went 56'		3' Keith Peacock	Stadium: Ninian Park; Attendance: 11,153; Referee: Lester Shapter (Paignton)

5 February 1977 24	Blackburn Rovers	2–1	Cardiff City	Blackburn
	John Waddington 30' (pen.); Bobby Svarc 79'		64' Peter Sayer	Stadium: Ewood Park; Attendance: 9,516; Referee: Roger Kirkpatrick (Leicester)

12 February 1977 25	Cardiff City	3–1	Oldham Athletic	Cardiff
15:00	Robin Friday 63'; Tony Evans 70'; Peter Sayer 87'		12' Graham Bell	Stadium: Ninian Park; Attendance: 12,708; Referee: Ken Burns (Stourbridge)

19 February 1977 26	Notts County	1–0	Cardiff City	Nottingham
	Les Bradd 64'			Stadium: Meadow Lane; Attendance: 9,401; Referee: John Hough (Macclesfield)

2 March 1977 27	Cardiff City	0–1	Orient	Cardiff
19:30			24' Laurie Cunningham	Stadium: Ninian Park; Attendance: 9,857; Referee: Derek Nippard (Bournemouth)

5 March 1977 28	Millwall	0–2	Cardiff City	London
			26' Tony Evans; 79' Tony Evans	Stadium: The Den; Attendance: 9,479; Referee: Leslie Burden (Dorset)

8 March 1977 29	Sheffield United	3–0	Cardiff City	Sheffield
19:30	Alan Woodward 54'; Keith Edwards 57'; Gary Hamson 87'			Stadium: Bramall Lane; Attendance: 12,907; Referee: Neville Ashley (Nantwich)

12 March 1977 30	Cardiff City	1–3	Chelsea	Cardiff
15:00	Phil Dwyer 83'		70' Ian Britton; 80' Kenny Swain; 90' Gary Stanley	Stadium: Ninian Park; Attendance: 20,194; Referee: Derek Civil (Birmingham)

26 March 1977 31	Cardiff City	0–1	Plymouth Argyle	Cardiff
15:00			85' Terry Austin	Stadium: Ninian Park; Attendance: 9,587; Referee: Darryl Reeves (Uxbridge)

2 April 1977 32	Blackpool	1–0	Cardiff City	Blackpool
	Paul Hart 86'			Stadium: Bloomfield Road; Attendance: 7,531; Referee: Keith Styles (Barnsley)

6 April 1977 33	Hereford United	2–2	Cardiff City	Hereford
19:30	33' John Layton; 67' Peter Spiring		Peter Sayer 74'; Peter Sayer 85'	Stadium: Edgar Street; Attendance: 7,672; Referee: Bert Newsome (Broseley Salop)

9 April 1977 34	Cardiff City	2–2	Wolverhampton Wanderers	Cardiff
15:00	Peter Sayer 89'; Paul Went 92'		49' Steve Daley; 69' Kenny Hibbitt	Stadium: Ninian Park; Attendance: 15,445; Referee: Tony Glasson (Salisbury)

11 April 1977 35	Southampton	3–2	Cardiff City	Southampton
15:00	Ted MacDougall 30'; Mick Channon 53'; Mick Channon 62'		70' Robin Friday; 88' Tony Evans	Stadium: The Dell; Attendance: 22,674; Referee: Bryan James (South Croydon)

16 April 1977 36	Cardiff City	4–2	Luton Town	Cardiff
15:00	Peter Sayer 9'; Robin Friday 22'; Robin Friday 38'; Phil Dwyer 82'	Luton report	11' Ron Futcher; 68' Brian Chambers	Stadium: Ninian Park; Attendance: 10,460; Referee: Alex Lees (Somerset)

23 April 1977 37	Nottingham Forest	0–1	Cardiff City	Nottingham
15:00			25' Peter Sayer	Stadium: City Ground; Attendance: 20,646; Referee: Ray Chadwick (Darwen)

26 April 1977 38	Wolverhampton Wanderers	4–1	Cardiff City	Wolverhampton
19:30	Geoff Palmer 57'; Alan Sunderland 71'; Martin Patching 89'; Kenny Hibbitt 90'		80' Peter Sayer	Stadium: Molineux; Attendance: 21,234; Referee: Allan Hughes (West Kirby)

30 April 1977 39	Cardiff City	0–1	Burnley	Cardiff
15:00			5' Peter Noble	Stadium: Ninian Park; Attendance: 11,064; Referee: Derek Lloyd (Worcester)

7 May 1977 40	Hull City	1–2	Cardiff City	Hull
15:00	Peter Daniel 31' (pen.)		19' (pen.) John Buchanan; 43' John Buchanan	Stadium: Boothferry Park; Attendance: 3,511; Referee: Trelford Mills (Barnsley)

10 May 1977 41	Bolton Wanderers	2–1	Cardiff City	Bolton
19:30	Neil Whatmore 29'; Garry Jones 81'		89' (pen.) John Buchanan	Stadium: Burnden Park; Attendance: 22,060; Referee: Gordon Kew (Leeds)

14 May 1977 42	Cardiff City	1–1	Carlisle United	Cardiff
15:00	Alan Campbell 17'		19' Les O'Neill	Stadium: Ninian Park; Attendance: 12,801; Referee: John Homewood (Sunbury-On-Thames)

=== League Cup ===
14 August 1976 Round 1 (1st Leg)	Cardiff City	2–1	Bristol Rovers	Cardiff
15:00	Tony Evans 60'; Adrian Alston 87' (pen.)		10' (pen.) Bruce Bannister	Stadium: Ninian Park; Attendance: 8,496; Referee: Trevor Spencer (Wootton Bassett)

17 August 1976 round 1 (2nd Leg)	Bristol Rovers	4–4 (5–6 agg.)	Cardiff City	Bristol
19:30	David Williams 5'; Bruce Bannister 33' (pen.); Bruce Bannister 48'; Frankie Prince 53'		23' Tony Evans; 30' Tony Evans; 68' Tony Evans; 81' Tony Evans	Stadium: Eastville; Attendance: 5,592; Referee: Derek Nippard (Bournemouth)

1 September 1976 Round 2	Cardiff City	1–3	Queens Park Rangers	Cardiff
19:30	Tony Evans 88'		34' Stan Bowles; 38' Dave Thomas; 62' Dave Clement	Stadium: Ninian Park; Attendance: 23,618; Referee: Alex Hamil (Wolverhampton)

=== FA Cup ===
8 January 1977 Round 3	Cardiff City	1–0	Tottenham Hotspur	Cardiff
15:00	Peter Sayer 6'			Stadium: Ninian Park; Attendance: 27,868; Referee: Alex Lees (Somerset)

29 January 1977 Round 4	Cardiff City	3–2	Wrexham	Cardiff
15:00	David Giles 20'; Peter Sayer 56'; John Buchanan 90'	Wrexham report	60' Graham Whittle; 89' Billy Ashcroft	Stadium: Ninian Park; Attendance: 28,953; Referee: John Hunting (Leicester)

26 February 1977 Round 5	Cardiff City	1–2	Everton	Cardiff
15:00	Tony Evans 10'		51' Bob Latchford; 63' Duncan McKenzie	Stadium: Ninian Park; Attendance: 35,582; Referee: Alf Grey (Great Yarmouth)

=== European Cup Winners Cup ===
4 August 1976 Prelim Round (1st Leg)	Cardiff City	1–0	Servette FC	Cardiff
19:30	Tony Evans 90'			Stadium: Ninian Park; Attendance: 10,266; Referee: Alexis Ponnet (Belgium)

11 August 1976 Prelim Round (2nd Leg)	Servette FC	2–1 (2–2a agg.)	Cardiff City	Geneva
20:30	Lucio Bizzini 63'; Hansjorg Pfister 86'		34' Derek Showers	Stadium: Stade des Charmilles; Attendance: 21,500; Referee: Heinz Aldinger (West Germany)

15 September 1976 1st Round (1st Leg)	Cardiff City	1–0	FC Dynamo Tbilisi	Cardiff
19:30	Adrian Alston 74'			Stadium: Ninian Park; Attendance: 11,181; Referee: Ole Amundsen (Denmark)

29 September 1976 1st Round (2nd Leg)	FC Dynamo Tbilisi	3–0 (3–1 agg.)	Cardiff City	Tbilisi
	Vladimir Gutsaev 22'; David Kipiani 72'; Piruz Kanteladze 80' (pen.)			Stadium: Central Stadium; Attendance: 100,000; Referee: B Spiegel (Austria)

=== Welsh Cup ===
19 January 1977 Round 5	Cardiff City	2–0	Stourbridge	Cardiff
	Phil Dwyer 77'; David Giles 87'			Stadium: Ninian Park; Attendance: 1,782; Referee: John Gow (Swansea)

16 February 1977 Round 6	Bangor City	0–2	Cardiff City	Bangor
19:30			47' David Giles; 72' Steve Grapes	Stadium: Farrar Road; Attendance: 5,000; Referee: Tom Reynolds (Swansea)

16 March 1977 Semi Final	Bridgend Town	1–2	Cardiff City	Bridgend
15:00	53'		14' Peter Sayer; 68' Tony Evans	Stadium: Coychurch Road; Attendance: 2,000; Referee: J Davies (Swansea)

16 May 1977 Final (First leg)	Cardiff City	2–1	Shrewsbury Town	Cardiff
19:00	Freddie Pethard 86'; Robin Friday 90'		8' Brian Hornsby	Stadium: Ninian Park; Attendance: 2,907; Referee: John Gow (Swansea)

18 May 1977 Final (Second leg)	Shrewsbury Town	3–0 (4–2 agg.)	Cardiff City	Shrewsbury
19:30	Colin Griffin 3'; Keith Pontin 61' (o.g.); Lee Roberts 67'			Stadium: Gay Meadow; Attendance: 3,178; Referee: John Gow (Swansea)

== See also ==
- Cardiff City F.C. seasons

== Bibliography ==
- Hayes, Dean (2006). The Who's Who of Cardiff City. Breedon Books. ISBN 1-85983-462-0.
- Vernon, Leslie; Rollin, Jack, eds. (1977). Rothmans Football Yearbook 1977–78. London: Macdonald and Jane's. ISBN 0-354-09018-6.
- Shepherd, Richard (2002). The Definitive Cardiff City F.C. Tony Brown. ISBN 1-899-46817-X.
- Crooks, John (1992). Cardiff City Football Club: Official History of the Bluebirds. Yore Publications. ISBN 0-9513321-8-X.
- Crooks, John (1986). Cardiff City Chronology 1920-86. John Crooks. ISBN 0-9511984-0-8.
- "Football Club History Database – Cardiff City". Archived from the original on 30 December 2008.
- Welsh Football Data Archive
