= Kevin Lloyd (disambiguation) =

- Kevin Lloyd (1949–1998) British television actor.
- Kevin Lloyd (footballer, born 1958), English footballer
- Kevin Lloyd (footballer, born 1970), Welsh footballer
