= Phil Dwyer =

Welsh footballer (1953–2021)

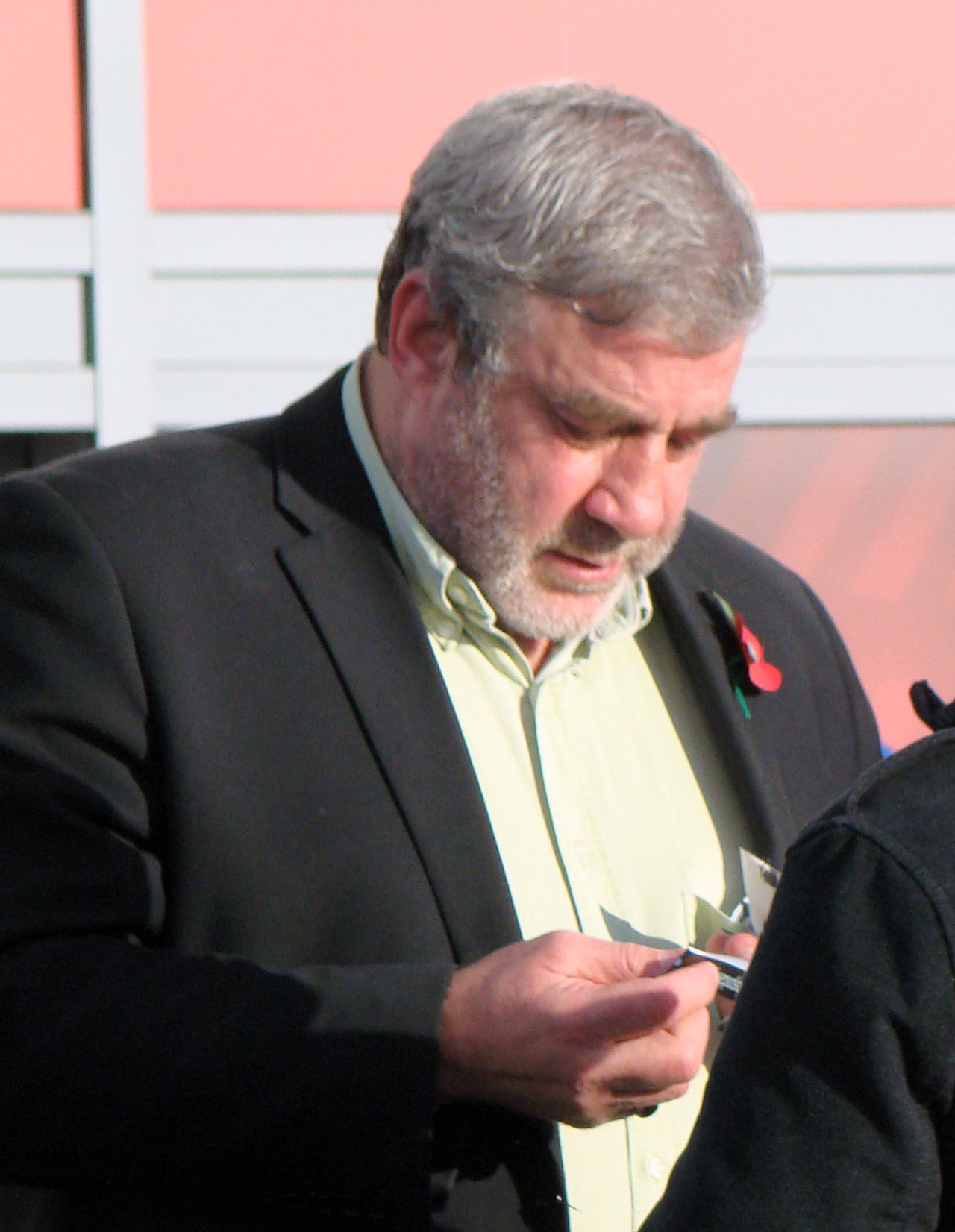
- Dwyer in 2012

Personal information
- Full name: Philip John Dwyer
- Date of birth: 28 October 1953
- Place of birth: Cardiff, Wales
- Date of death: 30 November 2021 (aged 68)
- Place of death: Cardiff, Wales
- Height: 6 ft 0 in (1.83 m)
- Position: Defender

Youth career
- 1969–1972: Cardiff City

Senior career*
Years	Team	Apps	(Gls)
1972–1985	Cardiff City	471	(41)
1985	→ Rochdale (loan)	15	(1)
Total		486	(42)

International career
1979	Wales U21	1	(0)
1978–1979	Wales	10	(2)
- * Club domestic league appearances and goals

Philip John Dwyer (28 October 1953 – 30 November 2021) was a Welsh professional footballer. Born in Cardiff, he began his career with his hometown club Cardiff City, joining the side as an apprentice in 1969. He made his professional debut for the club in October 1972, winning his first honours the same season by helping the side win the Welsh Cup. He suffered relegation with Cardiff in 1975 but helped the side win promotion back to the Second Division at the first attempt, scoring 10 goals during the season.

Dwyer remained a mainstay of the side for more than a decade, becoming known by the nickname "Joe" due to his perceived resemblance to Joe Royle. He was nearly released by manager Len Ashurst in 1982 following a serious knee injury. He returned to the first team, winning promotion in the 1982–83 season and was ever present during the 1983–84 campaign.

He set a new club record for Football League appearances the following year, overtaking Tom Farquharson's long standing record. Dwyer left the club in 1985 after falling out with manager Alan Durban. He made 575 appearances in all competitions for the club, scoring 51 times during a 13-year spell. He made his international debut for Wales in April 1978 and gained ten caps over the following year, scoring twice. He won his last cap in October 1979.

He finished his playing career with a brief loan spell at Fourth Division side Rochdale where he made 15 appearances, scoring once. He retired from playing in 1985 and joined the South Wales Police. He served with the force for 15 years before resigning after an incident of drink-driving. He later became a freelance legal representative.

== Early life ==
Dwyer was born on 28 October 1953 in the house where his family resided on Penarth Road in Grangetown, Cardiff. The area was in the midst of an economic downturn following the end of the Second World War and a falling demand for coal, one of the main industries of the region, which also affected the local docks. Dwyer's family home, which he described as having "tiny living quarters", had no bathroom, meaning the family bathed in front of the fire in a metal bath with water boiled on the stove. The house also had no central heating leading to "very harsh" nights in winter. His parents, Ted and Constance, had met and married in Tonypandy where his father had worked as a miner. In the hope of improving their prospects, the pair moved to Cardiff where his father found work at a foundry in Tremorfa. His mother also took up work in the canteen of an aluminium manufacturing factory.

Dwyer was the fifth child born to his parents. He had three older brothers, Brian, Kenny and Peter, and an older sister, Maureen. His siblings were significantly older than Dwyer and his brothers had already moved out of the family home by the time he was born. Of his three brothers, Kenny died at the age of 36 from diabetes, while Peter joined the armed forces. His other brother, Brian, was a keen sportsman and played football at amateur level for local side St Patrick's. He also represented Wales in boxing at the Empire Games.

As a child, Dwyer attended St. Patrick's Primary School in Grangetown where he joined the school band as a drummer. As his family was relatively poor, he and his friends would often steal fruit and vegetables from gardens and, on one occasion, he was caught shoplifting by a policeman. He took up numerous sporting activities in his youth, including cricket, rugby and baseball, but was most keen on football, idolising the Leeds United side featuring Billy Bremner, as well as Manchester United striker George Best. Dwyer grew up supporting Cardiff City and began attending matches at the club's home ground, Ninian Park, from a young age. Often unable to afford the entry fee for matches, he and his friends would often sneak into the ground by climbing disused railway sleepers to scale the fencing around the stands.

Dwyer attended Bishop Mostyn High School in Ely as a teenager, but later admitted to having little interest in pursuing his academic studies, choosing to focus on his sporting activities. He played rugby during midweek and football on Saturdays, sometimes playing two matches in one day, in the morning for his school's team and in the afternoon for North Clive Street Youth Club. In summer months, he also played baseball for Cardiff Catholics. Dwyer met his future wife Ann in his teens at a local nightclub and the pair began dating soon after.

== Club career ==
=== Youth and first team breakthrough ===
Dwyer's childhood dream was to become a professional footballer and his career began to progress at the age of 14 when he was picked to represent the Cardiff Schools side for the first time. He gained international recognition soon after when he was selected to represent Wales at under-15 level in the Victory Shield, a youth competition held between the Home Nations. Despite this, he initially struggled to attract interest from clubs until he was invited to train with the youth team at Cardiff City by Harry Parsons, a long serving employee of the club. Dwyer began training with the side every Tuesday but still held little hope of fulfilling his dream. He was due to start a carpentry apprenticeship with a company at Cardiff Docks which had been arranged by his brother-in-law who worked at the site. To Dwyer's surprise, he was offered a contract by Cardiff when he turned 16 in 1969, earning around £5 per week.

Dwyer became affectionally known as "Joe" by Cardiff fans and teammates, a nickname that originated during his early years at the club when goalkeeper Fred Davies commented that Dwyer resembled Everton forward Joe Royle. As an apprentice, he was also employed as the club's ground staff where youth players were required to fulfill various tasks, such as cleaning kit and clearing rubbish from the stands at the ground after matches. With no organised age group league to play in, the youth team competed in local amateur divisions against senior teams. During the 1970–71 season, Cardiff's youth team entered the FA Youth Cup and reached the final of the competition, the furthest the side has ever advanced. Having won five ties, Cardiff faced Arsenal in the final. Cardiff held Arsenal to a goalless draw in the first leg before losing the return fixture 2–0 at Ninian Park.

On his 18th birthday, Dwyer was offered his first professional contract with the club by manager Jimmy Scoular, earning £20 per week. With Cardiff struggling in the Second Division during the 1972–73 season, Dwyer became increasingly involved in the first team as Scoular attempted to improve the side's fortunes. On 7 October 1972, Scoular dropped David Carver from the side and handed Dwyer his professional debut against Leyton Orient. Playing as a right-back, he helped the side record a goalless draw, having been reduced to ten men when Alan Foggon had been sent off after 30 minutes. Dwyer remained in the first team for the remainder of the season and was ever present for the side in all competitions following his debut. He made 40 appearances during the season, helping the side narrowly avoid relegation with a 1–1 draw against Sunderland in the final match of the campaign. Despite the team's disappointing league form, Dwyer ended the season by winning his first senior trophy as Cardiff defeated Bangor City 5–0 in the final of the Welsh Cup.

=== First team regular ===
The previous season's low finish prompted Scoular to release several of Dwyer's youth teammates who had been promoted to the senior squad. Dwyer, however, was retained and promoted to the first team on a permanent basis. Victory in the Welsh Cup had qualified Cardiff for the UEFA Cup Winners' Cup and Dwyer made his debut in continental competition on 17 September 1974 in a goalless draw with Portuguese side Sporting CP. Cardiff were eliminated after losing the return leg 2–1. Scoular was sacked in November as the club struggled in the Second Division and was eventually replaced by Frank O'Farrell. Dwyer's performances resulted in his selection for the Wales under-23 side ahead of a match against England at Ashton Gate Stadium in January 1974, helping his side to a 0–0 draw. Cardiff's results gradually stabilised under O'Farrell, with Dwyer scoring his first senior goal for the club in a 2–0 victory over Preston North End on 9 March 1974 after heading in a cross from Leighton Phillips.

O'Farrell resigned suddenly in April 1974 and the side again avoided relegation on the final day of the season, drawing 1–1 with Crystal Palace to relegate their opponents in their stead. Dwyer won his second Welsh Cup at the end of the season, as Cardiff defeated Stourbridge under Jimmy Andrews, who had previously been O'Farrell's assistant. In only his second season as a senior professional, Dwyer was ever present in the league for Cardiff playing in all 42 matches during the campaign and missing just one first team match, the first leg of the Welsh Cup final against Stourbridge. He made a total of 52 appearances in the 1973–74 season. Andrews was forced to sell players to balance finances ahead of the 1974–75 season and the sales placed further strain on the club's results as the side were placed in the relegation zone midway through the campaign. In January 1975, Cardiff played Millwall at The Den. With Cardiff trailing 5–1, a frustrated Dwyer deliberately collided with Millwall goalkeeper Ray Goddard causing the opposition player to be stretchered off the field with a concussion. Dwyer's actions had caused fans from both sides to clash and a Millwall supporter ran onto the pitch and aimed a punch at Dwyer. Seeing the punch coming, Dwyer was able to avoid being hit and grabbed the fan in a headlock. Holding on until the fan was apprehended by police. Dwyer later refused to press charges against the fan. Cardiff finished the season in 21st position, suffering relegation to the Third Division, and went on to lose the Welsh Cup final 5–2 to Wrexham over two legs.

=== Promotion and Second Division return ===
Relegation prompted Andrews to rebuild his squad, letting several players leave and replacing them with new signings. Dwyer credited one of the new arrivals, Wales international Mike England, as being a positive influence on his game, remarking how he "made me a better player". Although the team's results were generally positive, Andrews believed his team lacked physical presence in midfield and moved Dwyer into an unfamiliar holding midfield role. As well as his defensive responsibilities, Dwyer also provided an attacking impetus by regularly charging into the penalty area for crosses. This proved fruitful immediately as he scored a brace in his first match in the new role and was denied a first career hat-trick when he missed a penalty late in the game.

On 8 November 1975, while playing in a league match against Gillingham, Dwyer collided with an opposition player and received a blow from the player's knee to the back of his head and was knocked unconscious. The impact resulted in a blocked airway and Dwyer briefly stopped breathing. Cardiff physio Ron Durham managed to clear his airway by using the corner flag pole and revived him with mouth-to-mouth resuscitation. He was taken to hospital by an ambulance that had driven onto the Priestfield pitch. Some initial reports even suggested that Dwyer had died, however, he was back playing for the Bluebirds just seven days later against Colchester United. He continued his goalscoring form in his new role, scoring braces during a 5–2 victory over Peterborough United in December and against Walsall and Colchester in February 1976. The side went on to secure promotion back to the Second Division at the first attempt, winning six of their last nine matches of the season and conceding just a single goal in the process. Dwyer also won the Welsh Cup for the third time in his career, defeating Hereford United over two legs in the final. In the first leg, Dwyer scored twice to finish the campaign with 10 goals in all competitions, a career high tally. He also recorded a career high 58 appearances, missing only one of the club's first team matches in all competitions.

Dwyer missed the start of the 1976–77 season after breaking his ankle in a baseball match days before the club's first match of the campaign against Swiss side Servette in the Cup Winners' Cup. He had continued to play baseball alongside his football career, concealing the fact from the staff at Cardiff, and hid the cause of the injury by claiming he had fallen down the stairs at his home. He returned to the side in late September, in a goalless draw with Millwall. The team travelled to Georgia ahead of Dwyer's next appearance where they suffered a 3–0 defeat to Dinamo Tbilisi in a match that was attended by 100,000 spectators. Upon his return, Dwyer found himself playing in his more usual role in defence rather than in midfield. Cardiff again struggled in the Second Division but avoided relegation on the final day of the season, after drawing 1–1 with Carlisle United.

Ahead of the 1977–78 season, Cardiff were struggling financially and the club was dealt a further blow by the restriction of crowd numbers at Ninian Park due to safety concerns. Dwyer was contacted by a former professional footballer who had recommended him to Greek side Panathinaikos. Dwyer was offered wages considerably higher than those he received with Cardiff, a villa and places at an English school for his children but the move broke down when Andrews refused to contemplate selling. Bristol City and Stoke City also made offers for Dwyer, with Bristol's bid totalling around £150,000, but Andrews again rejected the advances. The club began the season in poor form, winning one of their opening 10 matches. Dwyer bemoaned that the squad suffered a "severe lack of confidence" and the side suffered several heavy defeats, including conceding six goals in consecutive matches against Sheffield United and Bolton Wanderers in December 1977.

In an attempt to rectify the club's form, Andrews became increasingly desperate and even transfer listed the club's entire playing staff. An injury crisis amongst Cardiff's attacking players also led Andrews to use Dwyer and fellow defender Paul Went in forward roles in an attempt to utilise the pair's physical presence. Dwyer's most notable contribution in the role was a brace during a 2–2 draw with Crystal Palace in April 1978. Cardiff ultimately avoided relegation with a game to spare after beating Notts County.

=== Departure of Andrews and new managers ===
Dwyer began the following season by scoring in the opening game of the campaign, a 2–2 draw with Preston North End. However, the club's form remained indifferent and Andrews was sacked from his role as manager in November 1978. He was replaced by Richie Morgan in an appointment described by Dwyer as "a move that shocked every Cardiff City fan, and player". Despite his inexperience, Morgan led the club to their highest finish in nearly a decade, with Dwyer remaining a lynchpin of the side making 45 appearances in all competitions, having reverted to his traditional defensive role.

Expectations for the 1979–80 season were high following the previous campaign's finish and the side enjoyed positive results to begin with. Midway through the season, Cardiff had reached the top half of the table, but a series of poor results ultimately ended any hope of promotion. The team did record a goalless draw with First Division side Arsenal in the FA Cup, before losing the replay 2–1, but the side finished the league season in 15th place.

=== Testimonial year and relegation ===
The start of the 1980–81 season coincided with Dwyer's twentieth year with Cardiff and chairman Bob Grogan arranged a testimonial match against Stoke City. More than 10,000 fans attended the game, the second highest attendance the club recorded during the campaign. Although Morgan remained in charge, financial constraints led to the departure of several members of the coaching staff. Dwyer later described the move as "foolish" and the club struggled for form during the season and Cardiff avoided relegation on the final day of the season after recording consecutive goalless draws against Derby County and West Ham United.

Cardiff started the following season with a 2–2 draw with Oldham Athletic with Dwyer scoring his side's equalising goal. Morgan made several signings, including brothers Gary and Dave Bennett and steered the club to ninth place before he was relieved of his role and moved into an administrative position. Dwyer described the move as "one of the most baffling decisions I ever came across". The club endured a disastrous run of form under Morgan's replacement, Graham Williams, failing to win a game for more than three months between December 1981 and March 1982. Williams and Morgan were both sacked in March with the club in the relegation zone and were replaced by Len Ashurst. In his first game as a manager, Cardiff won 5–4 over Cambridge United. Dwyer played his last game of the season on 27 February in a 2–0 defeat to Sheffield Wednesday before succumbing to a knee injury, caused by arthritis brought on by an operation on his cartilage earlier in his career, that ended his campaign. He finished the season having made 28 appearances in all competitions, the lowest tally of his career. In his absence, Cardiff were relegated to the Third Division after losing 3–2 to Luton Town in the final match of the season. The club also suffered defeat in the final of the Welsh Cup, losing 2–1 to local rivals Swansea City.

To rectify his knee problem, Dwyer underwent another operation at the end of the season to have a piece of cartilage removed. Relegation had prompted rumours of a clearout of players at the club and, while recuperating in hospital, Dwyer read in the South Wales Echo that he was due to be released. On his release from hospital, Dwyer met with Ashurst who explained that, based on Dwyer's medical report, he believed Dwyer's best option was to retire from playing. Although Dwyer disagreed, the pair left the meeting on amicable terms. Dwyer set about training on his own, doing hundreds of squats each day while carrying sandbags to strengthen his knee. He received a phone call from former Cardiff manager Frank O'Farrell during the summer break who informed Dwyer of interest from Torquay United manager Bruce Rioch. He also received interest from Exeter City but decided on Torquay and played in several friendly matches for the side.

When news of his return to action with Torquay reached Ashurst, his former manager dispatched a scout to watch Dwyer. Ashurst immediately offered Dwyer a new contract with Cardiff which he quickly accepted and the turnaround concluded with Dwyer being named in the starting line up for Cardiff's opening match of the season against Wrexham. Cardiff lost the match 2–1, and Dwyer was dropped from the side. He remained on the sidelines for three weeks until his replacement, Keith Pontin, was also dropped after poor performances during a 4–0 defeat to Leyton Orient and a 3–2 defeat to Wigan Athletic. Dwyer returned to the starting line-up and scored the winning goal in a 2–1 victory over Walsall in his first game. Dwyer remained a mainstay of the side for the rest of the campaign as the club embarked on a strong run of form that ultimately ended in winning promotion back to the Second Division after finishing second. Although he often had to manage his training regime as his persistent knee injury limited his training time. The season was marred by an FA Cup upset defeat to non-league side Weymouth in which Dwyer was at fault for the winning goal after losing possession on the edge of his own penalty area.

=== Later years ===
Upon promotion, Dwyer was handed a new one-year contract by Ashurst. However, the club's return proved to be disappointing as a lack of funds and serious injury problems to the side's forward players made results difficult. During the course of the season, Ashurst resigned from his role to join Sunderland and was replaced by a caretaker manager duo of coaches Jimmy Goodfellow and Jimmy Mullen. The club finished the campaign in 15th place while Dwyer remained ever present in league competition for the second time during his career. He appeared in all 42 league matches and all 8 matches in cup competitions.

The 1984–85 season was Dwyer's 14th senior campaign for Cardiff. The season started poorly as Goodfellow struggled to assemble a competitive squad and the side were bottom of the table after two months. Although Dwyer had a brief highlight, scoring the winning goal against his boyhood idols Leeds United in mid-September, the club recorded five straight defeats in their following fixtures. In one of the defeats, a 2–1 loss to Blackburn Rovers on 18 September 1984, Dwyer set a new club record for appearances in the Football League with 446, surpassing goalkeeper Tom Farquharson's record which had stood since 1935.

Goodfellow was sacked soon after and replaced by former Cardiff player Alan Durban but results showed little improvement and player morale was low. On 17 February 1985, Cardiff suffered a 4–1 home defeat to Notts County and a furious Dwyer returned to the dressing room after the match and lambasted several of his teammates after believing that they had given up during the game. Durban voiced his displeasure with Dwyer over the incident, although the two left the ground on amicable terms. Dwyer was surprised to arrive at Ninian Park two days later to be told that Durban had accepted an offer from Fourth Division side Rochdale to sign Dwyer on loan for the remainder of the season. Cardiff went on to finish the season in 21st position in Dwyer's absence, returning to the Third Division. He finished his career with Cardiff having made 575 appearances in all competitions, a club record in the Football League era and second only to Billy Hardy in the club's history.

Rival South Wales clubs Swansea City and Newport County had shown interest in signing Dwyer, although Durban did not inform him of their interest. Despite dropping two divisions to sign for Rochdale, Dwyer actually earned a higher salary from his new side than he had previously been receiving. Cardiff allowed Dwyer to train with the club's youth team during the week before travelling north to Rochdale every Friday in preparation for the club's weekend match. He formed a defensive partnership with Joe Cooke on his arrival and would stay in a room at a local pub after each match before returning to Cardiff. Rochdale were placed in the relegation zone when Dwyer arrived but the club's form gradually improved and he scored his first goal for the club with the winner during a victory over fellow relegation candidates Southend United. Rochdale eventually finished in 17th position and offered Dwyer a one-year contract, but he chose to reject the offer and retired from football.

== International career ==
Having previously represented Wales at youth and under-23 levels, Dwyer received his first call-up to the senior Wales side in April 1978. Usually a defender, his first selection coincided with a period in which he was playing as a forward for Cardiff. He made his international debut for Wales as a forward against Iran in Tehran on 18 April 1978 at the age of 24. He scored the only goal of the game during a 1–0 win for Wales as well as having a second goal disallowed and hitting the post with another effort. Dwyer was recalled for Wales' following match and scored again during a 3–1 defeat to England in the 1978–79 British Home Championship at his home club ground, Ninian Park, after heading in from a cross by Carl Harris.

He played in the remaining two matches of the competition, a draw with Scotland and a victory over Northern Ireland. In 1979, he won his only cap for the Wales under-21 side after being selected as one of the side's eligible overage players for a match against England under-21s, along with his former Cardiff teammate Leighton Phillips. Wales went on to lose the match 1–0. Wales manager Mike Smith chose the pair to start in Wales' opening match of the 1979–80 British Home Championship, a 3–0 victory over Scotland.

A goalless draw with England left Wales and Northern Ireland in a deciding fixture in the final match to determine the tournament's winner. The match eventually ended in a draw which resulted in Northern Ireland winning the title as Wales finished as runners-up for the second consecutive season. Dwyer featured in a 2–0 victory over Malta later the same year before making his final appearance for Wales on 17 October 1979 in a 5–1 defeat to West Germany. Dwyer was involved in a physical altercation with a reporter after the match and, despite playing in 10 of Wales' 13 matches between April 1978 and October 1979, he never played for his country again.

== Style of play ==
Dwyer was particularly renowned for his tough style of play and described how he was seen as the team's "enforcer" during his time at the club. He later commented how "Not only did I have to take care of myself, but I also had to dish it out if one of our flair players was getting some bother". Dwyer was often tasked with shadowing the opposition's star players and attempting to disrupt their performance with physical tactics. Terry Yorath, who played alongside Dwyer with Wales, described him as "The kind of player you love to have in your side...and hate to play against". Harry Parsons, who initially brought him to Cardiff City, remarked that Dwyer "was solid and hard when I first saw him play, although he didn't look much like a footballer with his shovel feet."

Jimmy Andrews, who managed Dwyer for four seasons at Cardiff, described him as "brave and he had a good professional mentality. He wasn't a great player but a good scrapper who would always give you everything he had." Referring to his period playing as forward, Andrews added "I played him as a striker and he scored one or two important goals [...] he was always happy to give it a go—wherever I wanted him to play. He was a good pro." Roger Gibbins, who won promotion with Dwyer in 1983, described him as "an out-and-out centre half who was good in the air, competed very well and who put his head in where it hurt."

== Personal life ==
Dwyer married his long-term girlfriend Ann in 1972 at St Patrick's Roman Catholic Church, Grangetown. His best man at the ceremony was teammate Gary Bell. Dwyer and his wife moved into a flat on Cowbridge Road that was provided by Cardiff City, costing £5 per week. His wife worked as a secretary at the Angel Hotel in Cardiff. The couple's first child, Darren, was born in September 1974 and their second, Claire, was born in 1976. His wife, Ann, later became a care worker and spent 20 years in the role and also spent time working in a nursery.

After retiring from football, in 1985 Dwyer joined the South Wales Police force, after being recommended by a friend who worked in the force. Despite being a year older than the force's recruitment age limit, he took up a role in the town of Wenvoe, where he lived with his wife Ann for twenty years. When asked about Dwyer's age at the time a police chief constable commented that: "Phil had qualities which would be valuable to the police." Dwyer began his career in the force on foot patrol and later described the regular verbal abuse he and his colleagues received, although he states that being a former player for Cardiff ensured he received less than most police officers. In his spare time, Dwyer did briefly play amateur football and also coached local teams in the Cardiff area. He also represented the South Wales police football team in matches against their counterparts from around the United Kingdom.

He spent fifteen years as a police officer before leaving the force after an incident of drunk-driving in 2000. Dwyer had travelled to Weston-super-Mare with a colleague to interview a suspect before returning to Bridgend where he was due to meet colleagues. However, they never arrived and Dwyer remained in the pub longer than intended and, unable to find a lift home, he borrowed an unmarked police car from Bridgend police station to drive home. Believing he was under the limit, Dwyer fell asleep at the wheel and crashed the vehicle into a lamppost. He spent four weeks in hospital with broken ribs and was charged with aggravated taking of a police vehicle and drink-driving. Facing being dismissed from the force, Dwyer handed in his resignation.

He went on to become a freelance legal representative after being offered a position by a local law firm that he had known from his time in the force. His role would involve travelling to police stations to advise clients until their lawyer arrived. On 29 October 2008, after pleading guilty to a drunk driving charge, he was disqualified by Cardiff Magistrates from driving for three years, when after calling on a client at Rumney Police Station he was found to have had 54 microgrammes of alcohol in 100 millilitres of breath, 19 microgrammes over the legal limit.

Dwyer died in Cardiff on 30 November 2021, at the age of 68.

== Career statistics ==
=== Club ===
Appearances and goals by club, season and competition
Club	Season	League			FA Cup		League Cup		Other (Note: Includes other competitive competitions, including the Anglo-Scottish Cup, European Cup Winners' Cup and Welsh Cup.)		Total	
Club	Season	Division	Apps	Goals	Apps	Goals	Apps	Goals	Apps	Goals	Apps	Goals
Cardiff City	1972–73	Second Division	31	0	4	0	0	0	5	0	40	0
Cardiff City	1973–74	Second Division	42	1	1	0	3	0	6	0	52	1
Cardiff City	1974–75	Second Division	37	4	1	0	0	0	6	2	44	6
Cardiff City	1975–76	Third Division	45	8	4	0	2	0	7	2	58	10
Cardiff City	1976–77	Second Division	36	4	3	0	0	0	6	1	45	5
Cardiff City	1977–78	Second Division	39	6	1	0	4	1	7	0	51	7
Cardiff City	1978–79	Second Division	39	4	1	0	2	0	5	2	47	6
Cardiff City	1979–80	Second Division	32	0	2	0	2	0	1	0	37	0
Cardiff City	1980–81	Second Division	34	4	0	0	3	0	1	0	38	4
Cardiff City	1981–82	Second Division	22	2	1	0	2	0	3	1	28	3
Cardiff City	1982–83	Third Division	41	3	3	0	2	0	1	0	47	3
Cardiff City	1983–84	Second Division	42	2	1	0	4	1	3	0	50	3
Cardiff City	1984–85	Second Division	31	3	1	0	4	0	2	0	38	3
Cardiff City	Total		471	41	23	0	28	2	53	8	575	51
Rochdale (loan)	1984–85	Fourth Division	15	1	0	0	0	0	0	0	15	1
Career total			486	42	23	0	28	2	53	8	590	52

=== International goals ===
Scores and results list Wales goal tally first, score column indicates score after each Dwyer goal.

List of international goals scored by Phil Dwyer
No.	Date	Venue	Opponent	Score	Result	Competition
1	18 April 1978	Azadi Stadium, Tehran, Iran	Iran	1–0	1–0	Friendly
2	13 May 1978	Ninian Park, Cardiff, Wales	England	1–1	1–3	1978 British Home Championship

== Honours ==
Cardiff City

- Welsh Cup: 1972–73, 1973–74, 1975–76; runners-up: 1974–75, 1976–77
- Football League Third Division runners-up: 1975–76, 1982–83

== See also ==
- Football in Wales
