= Peter Morgan (footballer) =

Welsh footballer

Personal information
- Full name: Peter William Morgan
- Date of birth: 28 October 1951 (age 75)
- Place of birth: Cardiff, Wales
- Position: Defender

Senior career*
Years	Team	Apps	(Gls)
1969–1974	Cardiff City	16	(0)
1974–1976	Hereford United	16	(0)
1976–1977	Newport County	24	(1)
- * Club domestic league appearances and goals

Peter William Morgan (born 28 October 1951) is a Welsh former professional footballer who played as a defender. The younger brother of Richie Morgan, he began his career with Cardiff City and played alongside his brother on several occasions. He later played for Hereford United and Newport County.
