= Kevin Lloyd (footballer, born 1958) =

English footballer

Personal information
- Full name: Kevin John James Lloyd
- Date of birth: 12 June 1958 (age 68)
- Place of birth: Wolverhampton, England
- Position: Forward

Youth career
- Worcester City

Senior career*
Years	Team	Apps	(Gls)
1978–1979	Darlaston		
1979–1980	Cardiff City	1	(0)
1980–1981	Gillingham	1	(0)
1981–1982	Worcester City	35	(3)
1982	Albion Rovers SC		
1983-1984	Brunswick United Juventus		
1985	Green Gully		
1986	St Albans Dinamo		
- * Club domestic league appearances and goals

Kevin John James Lloyd (born 12 June 1958) is an English former professional footballer who played as a forward. He played in the Football League for Cardiff City and Gillingham.

== Career ==
Lloyd was born in 1958 in Wolverhampton. After playing football for Worcester City's youth and reserve teams, he moved into Sunday league football in Wolverhampton, from where he joined West Midlands (Regional) League club Darlaston in September 1978. He had no contract with Darlaston, preferring a non-contractual arrangement that let him continue playing Sunday football. He was out for a time through injury, before starting to attract attention early the following year. In March, Worcester City tried to re-sign him but he turned them down. Lloyd was then offered a trial with Football League club Cardiff City. Injury, for which he received daily treatment at nearby Walsall, prevented him taking up the offer immediately, but it remained open, and he signed for Cardiff in May 1979. Because Darlaston had no contract with Lloyd, they were not entitled to a transfer fee.

He was selected as the substitute for the visit to Notts County on the opening day of the 1979–80 Second Division season, and came on in place of Ray Bishop during a 4–1 defeat. The Sports Argus newspaper reported that "even the Darlaston officials [were] surprised by the speed of Lloyd's promotion." That proved to be his only appearance for Cardiff's first team.

He moved to Gillingham in July 1980, where he was top scorer for the reserve team during the 1980–81 season, but found it hard to break into the first team, playing only in one Football League game and an FA Cup game in which Gillingham suffered a shock defeat to non-League Maidstone United. He left Gillingham at the end of that season to return to Worcester City, for which he scored three goals from 35 appearances in the 1981–82 Alliance Premier League season.

The following year he emigrated to Australia, where he played for Albion Rovers SC of the Victorian State League and for National Soccer League teams Brunswick Juventus, helping them reach the 1984 Southern Conference Finals, Green Gully and St Albans Dinamo.
