= Les Cartwright =

Welsh footballer

Personal information
- Full name: Leslie Cartwright
- Date of birth: 4 March 1952 (age 74)
- Place of birth: Aberdare, Wales
- Height: 5 ft 7 1/2 in (1.71 m)
- Position: Midfielder

Youth career
- Coventry City

Senior career*
Years	Team	Apps	(Gls)
1973–1977	Coventry City	68	(4)
1977–1982	Wrexham	115	(6)
1982–1985	Cambridge United	60	(1)
1983–1984	→ Southend United (loan)	4	(0)
- Nuneaton Borough

International career
1974–1978	Wales	7	(0)
- * Club domestic league appearances and goals

Leslie Cartwright (born 4 March 1952) is a Welsh former international footballer. He was part of the Wales national football team between 1974 and 1978, playing 7 matches. He played his first match at 21 years on 11 May 1974 against England and his last match at 26 years on 25 October 1978 against Malta.

== See also ==
- List of Wales international footballers (alphabetical)
