= Gordon Mair =

Scottish footballer

Gordon Mair (born 18 December 1958) is a Scottish football player, who is best known for his career with Notts County.

A left winger, Mair played with County from 1976 to 1984. He was a key player in their ascent to the First Division in the early 1980s and would score 9 goals in the top flight in the 1981–82 season. After relegation, he left to play for Lincoln City, later moving to Motherwell, Clydebank and Ayr United.

In January 2008, he was working in a superstore in Bellshill commenting that "it is very different from football and not the way you think it will work out."
