= Alan Dwyer =

English footballer

Personal information
- Full name: Robert Alan Dwyer
- Date of birth: 5 October 1952 (age 74)
- Place of birth: Liverpool, England
- Position: Left-back

Youth career
- Halewood Youth Club
- Wrexham

Senior career*
Years	Team	Apps	(Gls)
1974–1981	Wrexham	180	(2)
1981–1982	Stockport County	4	(0)
- Oswestry Town
- * Club domestic league appearances and goals

Robert Alan Dwyer (born 5 October 1952) is an English former professional footballer who played as a left-back. He made 180 league appearances for Wrexham in the 1970s and 1980s.

== Career ==
Dwyer was discovered by Wrexham's scouting team whilst playing for Halewood Youth Club in his hometown of Liverpool. Initially signed as a forward, Wrexham manager John Neal would move him to left-back.

His biggest success came in the 1977–78 season where he helped Wrexham win the Third Division.

He left Wrexham in 1981, eventually ending up at Stockport County, however injury prevented him from a regular first team place, and he eventually move to non-league Oswestry Town.
