= Mark Hilton (English footballer) =

English footballer

Personal information
- Full name: Mark Gerard Hilton
- Date of birth: 15 January 1960 (age 66)
- Place of birth: Middleton, England
- Position: Midfielder

Senior career*
Years	Team	Apps	(Gls)
1977–1981	Oldham Athletic	50	(2)
1981–1983	Bury	32	(3)
1983–1984	Witton Albion		
1988–1989	Ashton United		
1989–1991	Mossley	67	(4)
1991–1992	Ashton United		
- Oldham Town
1993–1994	Mossley	6	(1)

Managerial career
- 1989–1990: Mossley
- * Club domestic league appearances and goals

Mark Gerard Hilton (born 15 January 1960, in Middleton, Greater Manchester) is an English former professional footballer who played in the Football League as a midfielder.

After retiring from professional football, Hilton was player-manager of Mossley from December 1989 until October 1990.
