= Dave Stewart (footballer, born 1958) =

Northern Irish footballer

Personal information
- Full name: Charles David Stewart
- Date of birth: 20 May 1958 (age 68)
- Place of birth: Belfast, Northern Ireland
- Height: 1.73 m (5 ft 8 in)
- Position: Left winger

Youth career
- Bangor
- 1974–1975: Hull City

Senior career*
Years	Team	Apps	(Gls)
1975–1979	Hull City	51	(7)
1979	Chelsea	0	(0)
1979–1982	Scunthorpe United	97	(19)
1982	Bridlington Trinity		
1982–1983	Goole Town		
1983	Hartlepool United	8	(0)
- Grantham
Total		156	(26)

International career
1977	Northern Ireland	1	(0)
- * Club domestic league appearances and goals

Charles David Stewart (born 20 May 1958) is a Northern Irish former professional footballer who played as a left winger.

== Career ==
Born in Belfast, Stewart played for Bangor, Hull City, Chelsea, Scunthorpe United, Bridlington Trinity, Goole Town, Hartlepool United and Grantham. He also earned one cap for the Northern Ireland national team.
