= David Fogg =

English footballer

Personal information
- Date of birth: 28 May 1951 (age 75)
- Place of birth: Liverpool, England
- Height: 5 ft 11 in (1.80 m)
- Position: Defender

Senior career*
Years	Team	Apps	(Gls)
1970–1976	Wrexham	161	(0)
1976–1985	Oxford United	293	(16)
- * Club domestic league appearances and goals

David Fogg (born 28 May 1951) is an English former footballer who played for Oxford United and Wrexham. During his spell at Oxford, he played 293 league games. After retirement, Fogg joined the coaching staff at Oxford. He then went to be on the youth team coach at Everton and Cardiff City.
