= Wayne Hughes (footballer) =

Welsh footballer

Personal information
- Full name: Byron Wayne Hughes
- Date of birth: 8 March 1958 (age 68)
- Place of birth: Port Talbot, Wales
- Height: 6 ft 0 in (1.83 m)
- Position: Midfielder

Youth career
- 1974–1976: West Bromwich Albion

Senior career*
Years	Team	Apps	(Gls)
1976–1979	West Bromwich Albion	6	(2)
1979	Tulsa Roughnecks	29	(12)
1979–1982	Cardiff City	46	(1)
1982–1983	Bath City		
1984	Bath City		
1984–1985	Paulton Rovers		
1985	Yeovil Town		

International career
	Wales U21	3	(0)
- * Club domestic league appearances and goals

Byron Wayne Hughes (born 8 March 1958) is a Welsh former professional footballer who played as a midfielder. During his career, he made over 50 appearances in the Football League during spells with West Bromwich Albion and Cardiff City and also played in the NASL for Tulsa Roughnecks. He also represented Wales at youth level, winning three caps for the Wales under-21 team.

== Career ==
Having had unsuccessful trials with Everton, Leeds United and Manchester City, Hughes began his career with West Bromwich Albion, joining the club's youth system as an apprentice in 1974. He went on to captain the Baggies youth side and was part of the team that won the 1976 FA Youth Cup final against Wolverhampton Wanderers. He signed his first professional contract with West Brom in March 1976 made his debut in May 1977, in the final match of the 1976–77 season, during a 4–0 defeat against Aston Villa. However, he struggled to establish himself in the first-team and made eight appearances during his time with the club. He instead joined the Tulsa Roughnecks in the North American Soccer League in January 1979 and scored 12 times during his only season at the club.

In October 1979, Cardiff City manager Richie Morgan paid £70,000 to bring Hughes to the club, making his debut for the club on 6 October 1979 in a 2–1 victory over Luton Town. He remained with the club for three seasons as they struggled in the Second Division and was released at the end of the 1981–82 season after they suffered relegation to Division Three. Following his release, he joined Bath City but retired from football after a single season. He later decided to return to football after eight months, playing for Bath for a second time and later had spells with Paulton Rovers and Yeovil Town.

== Later life ==
After retiring from football, Hughes worked as a pub landlord in Swansea before becoming a hotelier in Blackpool. Wayne then played Sunday football he played for Burn Naze FC, and in the 1989 local cup final beat Mammas FC 5-1. He then played for the famous Mammas FC in Blackpool winning back to back Lancashire Sunday Trophy titles in 1993 and 1994 as well as being the only team to win the "Grand Slam" of four trophies in 1993.
