= Stuart Metcalfe =

English footballer

Personal information
- Date of birth: 6 October 1950 (age 76)
- Place of birth: Blackburn, England
- Height: 5 ft 7 in (1.70 m)
- Position: Midfielder

Senior career*
Years	Team	Apps	(Gls)
1967–1980	Blackburn Rovers	386	(21)
1980–1981	Carlisle United	25	(3)
1981–1982	Carolina Lightnin'		
1982–1983	Blackburn Rovers	0	(0)
1982	Crewe Alexandra	3	(0)
1982–1983	Blackburn Rovers	1	(0)
1983–	Chorley		
- * Club domestic league appearances and goals

Stuart Metcalfe (born 6 October 1950 – August 2020 was an English footballer who played as a central midfielder.

Metcalfe, a talented midfielder, began his career with his local club Blackburn Rovers in 1967. He would become one of the pillars of the club during the 1970s, part of a trio of players who stayed loyal to the club through the decade including Tony Parkes and Derek Fazackerley. His midfield partnership with Tony Parkes was instrumental in the club's Third Division championship in 1975. After leaving Blackburn in 1980, he joined Carlisle United before joining American Soccer League club Carolina Lightnin' in 1981. A brief spell at Crewe Alexandra and a return to Blackburn followed before leaving League football to play for Chorley.
