= Mark Elliott (footballer) =

Welsh footballer

Personal information
- Full name: Richard Mark Elliott
- Date of birth: 20 March 1959 (age 67)
- Place of birth: Rhondda, Wales
- Position: Midfielder

Senior career*
| Years | Team | Apps | (Gls) |
| 1976–1977 | Merthyr Tydfil | ? | (?) |
| 1977–1979 | Brighton & Hove Albion | 3 | (0) |
| 1979–1980 | Cardiff City | 7 | (0) |
| 1979–1980 | → Bournemouth (loan) | 4 | (0) |
| 1980–1981 | Ton Pentre | ? | (?) |
| 1981–1982 | Wimbledon | 11 | (1) |
| 1982–1983 | Walton & Hersham | ? | (?) |
| 1994–1995 | Inter Cardiff | 3 | (0) |
- * Club domestic league appearances and goals

Richard Mark Elliott (born 20 March 1959) is a Welsh former professional footballer who played in the Football League as a midfielder.

== Honours ==
Wimbledon

- Football League Group Cup runner-up: 1981–82
