= Terry Brisley =

English footballer (born 1950)

Personal information
- Full name: Terence William Brisley
- Date of birth: 4 July 1950 (age 76)
- Place of birth: Stepney, London, England
- Position: Midfielder

Senior career*
Years	Team	Apps	(Gls)
1967–1975	Orient	142	(9)
1974–1975	→ Southend United (loan)	8	(0)
1975–1978	Millwall	107	(14)
1978–1979	Charlton Athletic	48	(5)
1979–1981	Portsmouth	55	(13)
1981	Maidstone United	?	(?)
1981–1982	Chelmsford City	9	(0)
Total		369	(41)
- * Club domestic league appearances and goals

Terence William Brisley (born 4 July 1950) is an English former footballer who played as a midfielder in the Football League.
