= Frankie Prince =

Welsh footballer (born 1949)

Personal information
- Full name: Francis Anthony Prince
- Date of birth: 1 December 1949 (age 76)
- Place of birth: Penarth, Wales
- Height: 5 ft 9 in (1.75 m)
- Position: Midfielder

Senior career*
Years	Team	Apps	(Gls)
1967–1980	Bristol Rovers	362	(22)
1980–1982	Exeter City	31	(2)
1982–????	Gloucester City		
Total		393	(24)
- * Club domestic league appearances and goals

Francis Anthony 'Frankie' Prince (born 1 December 1949) is a former professional footballer who played as a midfielder for Bristol Rovers, Exeter City and Gloucester City between 1967 and the 1980s.

Prince started out as an apprentice at Bristol Rovers, earning his first professional contract in December 1967. He went on to make 362 League appearances and score 22 goals in a thirteen-year spell, before joining Exeter City in 1980 and playing a further 31 League games for them. He ended his playing career with non-League Gloucester City.

Following a break in his football career, during which time he worked as a greengrocer and odd job man, he joined Torquay United in 1992 as their Community Officer.
