= Paul Davies (footballer, born 1960) =

English footballer and manager

Personal information
- Full name: Paul Andrew Davies
- Date of birth: 9 October 1960 (age 66)
- Place of birth: Kidderminster, England
- Height: 5 ft 11 in (1.80 m)
- Position: Striker

Senior career*
Years	Team	Apps	(Gls)
1978–1980	Cardiff City	2	(0)
- Trowbrige Town
?–1983	Heracles Almelo	9	(7)
1983–1999	Kidderminster Harriers	656	(307)
1999–?	Worcester City		

Managerial career
- 2007: Stourport Swifts
- * Club domestic league appearances and goals

Paul Andrew Davies (born 9 October 1960) is an English former professional footballer. Nicknamed "Ocker", he began his career in the Football League with Cardiff City.

== Early career ==
Davies was born in Kidderminster, Worcestershire, but first played professional football for Cardiff City, after joining the club from non-league side Oldswinford Town. He made his debut for the Bluebirds on 16 February 1980 in a 1–0 defeat to Bristol Rovers but made just one further appearance or the club before leaving. He joined Trowbridge Town and Dutch club Heracles Almelo, scoring 7 times in 9 appearances for the club, before signing for his home town side Kidderminster Harriers for £1,500 in 1983.

== Later playing career ==
A centre forward, Davies remained a free-scoring stalwart in various Harriers teams under long-serving Harriers' manager Graham Allner throughout the 1980s and into the 1990s, courtesy of Allner's free flowing 4-3-3 'total football' strategy. League sides made various approaches to sign the centre forward (including Cardiff City, Walsall and Wolves) but Davies remained with the Conference side though 656 games, scoring 307 goals, and becoming the Conference all-time top goal-scorer.

With fellow strikers Kim Casey and Mick Tuohy, Davies had arguably his best spell in 1985–87 when the Harriers scored 99 goals in one season, with Davies scoring both goals in Kidderminster's 2–1 FA Trophy Final success against Burton Albion. 1986–87 then saw Davies joint-top scorer in the Conference with 26 goals.

He finally left Harriers in 1999 to join Graham Allner as assistant at Worcester City.

In 2004 Paul Davies was voted by fans the Harriers "cult hero" on BBC TV's Football Focus weekly mobile phone vote.

== Managerial career ==
Davies was manager of Southern League Division One (Midlands) side Stourport Swifts for a few months in 2007 He is currently assistant coach at Bewdley Town FC.
