= David Staniforth (footballer) =

English footballer

Personal information
- Full name: David Albry Staniforth
- Date of birth: 6 October 1950 (age 76)
- Place of birth: Chesterfield, England
- Height: 6 ft 0 in (1.83 m)
- Position: Forward

Youth career
- ?–1968: Sheffield United

Senior career*
Years	Team	Apps	(Gls)
1968–1974	Sheffield United	26	(3)
1974–1979	Bristol Rovers	151	(32)
1979–1982	Bradford City	115	(25)
1982–1984	Halifax Town	69	(21)
Total		361	(81)
- * Club domestic league appearances and goals

David Albry Staniforth (born 6 October 1950) is a former professional footballer who played in The Football League for Sheffield United, Bristol Rovers, Bradford City, and Halifax Town.

He played for Nottingham County Boys as a child, and in 1966 he was offered the chance to join Huddersfield Town; an offer which he rejected in order to stay in school. He later joined Sheffield United as an apprentice, and went on to play 26 times in the Football League First Division for The Blades, scoring three times, having joined the professional ranks in 1968.

Bristol Rovers signed Staniforth from Sheffield United in 1974 for a fee of £20,000, and he went on to make 151 League appearances and score 32 goals for the West Country side during a five-year stay with the club. Bradford signed him in 1979 for a fee of £24,000, and after helping them to win promotion from the Football League Fourth Division he moved to Halifax Town as a player/coach in 1982. Halifax proved to be his final club, and he retired from football in 1984.
