= Gary Harris (footballer) =

English footballer (born 1959)

Personal information
- Full name: Gary Wayne Harris
- Date of birth: 31 May 1959 (age 67)
- Place of birth: Birmingham, England
- Height: 5 ft 9 in (1.75 m)
- Position: Winger

Senior career*
Years	Team	Apps	(Gls)
1977–1980	Cardiff City	4	(0)
- Trowbridge Town
1983–1984	Gloucester City	33	(4)
- * Club domestic league appearances and goals

Gary Wayne Harris (born 31 May 1959) is an English former professional footballer. He made four appearances in the Football League for Cardiff City between 1977 and 1980.
