= Gary Stevens (footballer, born 1954) =

English footballer

Personal information
- Date of birth: 3 August 1954 (age 72)
- Place of birth: Birmingham, England
- Height: 6 ft 1 in (1.85 m)
- Positions: Striker; defender

Team information
- Current team: Wellington F.C. (Manager)

Senior career*
Years	Team	Apps	(Gls)
197?–1978	Evesham United		
1978–1982	Cardiff City	150	(44)
1982–1986	Shrewsbury Town	150	(30)
1986–1987	Brentford	32	(10)
1987–1990	Hereford United	94	(10)
1999–2000	Westfields	23	(5)
- Knighton Town

Managerial career
- 200?–200?: Knighton Town
- 2008–2011: Hereford United
- 2011–2017: Cheltenham Town
- 2018–: Wellington
- * Club domestic league appearances and goals

Gary Martin Stevens (born 3 August 1954) is an English former professional footballer who played as a striker or defender.

Stevens was playing non-league football for Evesham United while working at Wiggins (later Special Metals) Herefordshire, when he was spotted by Cardiff City, and signed for the club during the summer of 1978 for a £4,000 fee. He made his debut in September of that year, during a 7–1 defeat against Luton Town, and scored his first goal a week later on his home debut in a 2–0 victory over Blackburn Rovers. Gary went on to score a total of thirteen goals in all competitions in his first year. The following year he finished as the club's joint top scorer, along with Ray Bishop, scoring eleven goals, and went on to claim the award again during the 1981–82 season.

Following the end of the season he joined Shrewsbury Town for £20,000. He spent four years at the club before ending his career with spells at Brentford and Hereford United. He was also player coach at Mid Wales League side Knighton Town.

He is now a college tutor, manager of Wellington, and works part-time for the Herefordshire FA.
