= Alan Shoulder =

English footballer (1953–2025)

Personal information
- Full name: Alan Shoulder
- Date of birth: 4 February 1953
- Place of birth: Bishop Auckland, England
- Date of death: 2 February 2025 (aged 71)
- Height: 5 ft 5 in (1.65 m)
- Position: Forward

Senior career*
| Years | Team | Apps | (Gls) |
| 1971–1977 | Bishop Auckland | | |
| 1977–1978 | Blyth Spartans | | |
| 1978–1982 | Newcastle United | 107 | (35) |
| 1982–1985 | Carlisle United | 112 | (32) |
| 1985–1988 | Hartlepool United | 66 | (24) |
- Ferryhill Athletic

Managerial career
- Crook Town
- 1998: Gateshead (caretaker)
- 1998: Blyth Spartans
- 2002: Bishop Auckland
- Willington
- West Auckland Town
- * Club domestic league appearances and goals

Alan Shoulder (4 February 1953 – 2 February 2025) was an English professional footballer and football manager.

== Career ==
A forward, Shoulder began his career with Leeholme Juniors, before joining Bishop Auckland in 1972. In 1977, he joined Blyth Spartans and featured in their run to the fifth round of the FA Cup. In December 1978, he was transferred to Newcastle United for £20,000, where he scored 38 goals in 117 games. In 1982, he joined Carlisle United on a free transfer, then in 1985 joined Hartlepool United, again on a free transfer. An eye injury forced him to retire as a professional player in December 1988, but he continued playing with Ferryhill Athletic

Shoulder later became assistant manager at Gretna, and then a coach at Newcastle Blue Star. He has since managed several clubs, including Coundon, Crook Town, Bishop Auckland, Willington, West Auckland Town and Blyth Spartans.

== Death ==
Shoulder died on 2 February 2025, two days before what would have been his 72nd birthday.

== Honours ==
Individual

- Newcastle United Player of the Year: 1979–80
