= Gerry Byrne (footballer, born 1957) =

Scottish footballer

Personal information
- Full name: Gerald Byrne
- Date of birth: 10 April 1957 (age 69)
- Place of birth: Glasgow, Scotland
- Position: Midfielder

Senior career*
| Years | Team | Apps | (Gls) |
| 1975–1979 | Cardiff City | 15 | (0) |
| 1979–1981 | Weymouth | | |
| 1982–1983 | Bath City | | |
- * Club domestic league appearances and goals

Gerald Byrne (born 10 April 1957) is a Scottish former professional footballer who played as a midfielder. He played in the Football League with Cardiff City before moving into non-league football.

== Career ==
Born in Glasgow, Byrne joined Cardiff City in 1975 but was forced to wait three years before making his professional debut in a 0–0 draw with Tottenham Hotspur. He struggled to establish himself in the first team in the following two seasons before being released, later joining Weymouth. He spent two years with Weymouth, making over 100 appearances, before spending a single season with Bath City.
