= Peter Kitchen =

English footballer (born 1952)

Personal information
- Full name: Michael Peter Kitchen
- Date of birth: 16 February 1952 (age 74)
- Place of birth: Mexborough, England
- Height: 1.75 m (5 ft 9 in)
- Position: Striker

Senior career*
Years	Team	Apps	(Gls)
1970–1977	Doncaster Rovers	228	(90)
1977–1979	Leyton Orient	65	(28)
1979–1980	Fulham	24	(6)
1980–1982	Cardiff City	67	(21)
1982	Happy Valley	7	(5)
1982–1984	Leyton Orient	49	(21)
1984–1985	Las Vegas Americans	7	(0)
1985	Dagenham	6	(0)
1985	Chester City	5	(1)
1985	Dagenham		
1991	Margate	18	(4)
Total		476	(166)
- * Club domestic league appearances and goals

Michael Peter Kitchen (born 16 February 1952) is an English former professional footballer who played in the Football League in the 1970s and 80s as a forward.

== Career ==
Born in Mexborough, Kitchen began his career at Doncaster Rovers, after being spotted by manager Lawrie McMenemy, and he went on to spend seven years there as a first team player. He made his debut at the age of 18 and scored after just two minutes during a 3–0 win over Shrewsbury Town and scored again in his second game, a 2–1 defeat to Swansea Town. Despite Doncaster struggling in Division Four for several years, Kitchen made a name for himself at Rovers, forming striking partnerships with Brendan O'Callaghan and Mike Elwiss. He played alongside Elwiss in one of the biggest games for the club at the time when they drew 2–2 with Liverpool at Anfield on 5 January 1974, with Kitchen scoring one of the goals, before losing 2–0 in the replay. Kitchen went on to attract attention from higher divisions for several years, including spending time on trial at Bobby Robson's Ipswich Town, before signing for Leyton Orient in the summer of 1977 for £40,000.

Ever present in his first year at Orient he finished as the club's top scorer with 21 goals, as well as scoring seven times in the FA Cup as the club reached the semi-finals beating Chelsea and Middlesbrough along the way. The following year he moved across London to join Fulham for a fee of £150,000. The move did not work out for him as he struggled to find form and a series of injuries in his second year at Fulham saw him miss most of the season as the club were relegated and he moved to Cardiff City for £100,000.

He made his debut for Cardiff in a 4–2 win against one of his former clubs in Leyton Orient and, although he didn't score in that game, he ended the season as the club's top scorer with 13 League goals and, mainly thanks to scoring 5 times in a 6–0 win over Cardiff Corinthians in the Welsh Cup, 19 goals in all competitions as Cardiff just avoided relegation. However his form at the club did not continue into his second season at Ninian Park as the club failed to avoid relegation for the second year running and fell to Division Three.

After leaving Cardiff he had a short spell with Hong Kong side Happy Valley, before returning to play for Leyton Orient in 1982–83. He made another 49 league appearances in his second spell with the London club, and then went to play Major Indoor Soccer League football with Las Vegas Americans. He returned to play for Dagenham in non-league football, then finished his Football League career with a short stint at Chester City in 1984–85 before returning to Dagenham for the remainder of that season before being released.

Kitchen retired at the age of 33, though made a short come back for Margate in 1991 and during the 1990s made 228 appearances for Corinthian Casuals Veterans, scoring 280 goals.

His post-football career included coaching on the youth development programme at Wimbledon F.C., and as of September 2006 he was working at a leisure management company in Sevenoaks, retiring by 2010 to spend time travelling.
