= John Buchanan (footballer, born 1951) =

Scottish footballer and manager

Personal information
- Date of birth: 19 September 1951 (age 75)
- Place of birth: Dingwall, Scotland
- Height: 5 ft 8 in (1.73 m)
- Position: Midfielder

Senior career*
Years	Team	Apps	(Gls)
????–1970	Ross County		
1970–1974	Northampton Town	114	(24)
1974–1981	Cardiff City	231	(54)
1981–1983	Northampton Town	69	(6)
Total		414	(84)

Managerial career
- 1985–1987: Ross County
- * Club domestic league appearances and goals

John Buchanan (born 19 September 1951) is a Scottish former professional footballer and manager. During his career he played for Ross County, Northampton Town and Cardiff City, developing a reputation as a goalscoring midfielder.

== Career ==
Buchanan was playing in the Highland Football League for Ross County when he joined Northampton Town in 1970. He soon established himself in the first team and eventually moved to Cardiff City in October 1974 in exchange for John Farrington, making his debut in a 3–2 victory over York City. Cardiff were relegated in his first year at the club but bounced back up to the division the following season. Despite Buchanan being a midfielder he topped the club's scoring charts in two of his seven seasons with his impressive scoring record, his highest being a total of sixteen during the 1978–79 season including his only hattrick for Cardiff, during a 4–0 win over Sheffield United.

During his time at Cardiff, Buchanan was once arrested during a match. After watching Cardiff players Keith Pontin and Phil Dwyer receive red cards in the same incident Buchanan, himself suspended and watching the match from the stands, attempted to get on the pitch to voice his opinion to the referee only to be confronted by police. He left Ninian Park in 1981 to return to Northampton where he finished his career.

Buchanan later returned to the Highland League with Ross County as manager followed by a spell with Highland League neighbours, Brora Rangers Before playing football professionally he played shinty for Caberfeidh.

== After retirement ==
Buchanan worked as a butcher in his hometown Dingwall.

== Honours ==
Cardiff City

- Welsh Cup runner-up: 1974–75, 1976–77
- Football League Third Division runner-up: 1975–76
