= Richie Morgan =

Welsh footballer and manager

Personal information
- Full name: Richard Leslie Morgan
- Date of birth: 3 October 1946 (age 80)
- Place of birth: Cardiff, Wales
- Position: Defender

Senior career*
Years	Team	Apps	(Gls)
????–1966	Cardiff Corinthians		
1966–1977	Cardiff City	68	(0)

Managerial career
- 1978–1981: Cardiff City
- 1981–1982: Cardiff City (general manager)
- 1985–1987: Barry Town
- * Club domestic league appearances and goals

Richard Leslie Morgan (born 3 October 1946) is a Welsh former professional footballer and manager.

== Career ==
Born in Cardiff, Morgan was playing for Cardiff Corinthians before signing for Cardiff City in 1966. The majority of his time playing at Ninian Park was spent as understudy to club stalwart Don Murray. While at Cardiff, Morgan also played alongside his brother Peter who spent several years at the club before moving to Hereford United. He retired from playing in 1977 and joined the administrative staff at Cardiff.

Following the dismissal of Jimmy Andrews, he was appointed manager of the club in November 1978. He brought in several former Cardiff players to join his coaching staff, including Doug Livermore and Brian Harris. Despite spending a large amount of money on players the team struggled and began to fall down the Football League. In November 1981 he was moved upstairs to a role as general manager, working alongside Graham Williams. However, the team's form took a turn for the worse and the club nosedived down the table. Less than three months into the two-tier arrangement, the pair were sacked in February 1982. Morgan later went on to manage Barry Town, helping them to win several league championships.

== Managerial statistics ==
Team	Country	From	To	Record				
Team	Country	From	To	G	W	D	L	Win %
Cardiff City	(Wales)	1 November 1978	3 March 1981	105	38	24	43	36.19
Total				105	38	24	43	36.19

Sporting positions
Preceded by Mike England	Cardiff City captain 1976-1977	Succeeded by Phil Dwyer
