= Steve Grapes =

English footballer

Personal information
- Full name: Stephen Philip Grapes
- Date of birth: 25 February 1953 (age 73)
- Place of birth: Norwich, England
- Height: 5 ft 7 in (1.70 m)
- Position: Midfielder

Senior career*
Years	Team	Apps	(Gls)
1970–1976	Norwich City	41	(3)
1975–1976	→ AFC Bournemouth (loan)	7	(1)
1976–1982	Cardiff City	147	(6)
1982–1983	Torquay United	31	(0)
1983–?	Bath City	?	(?)
- * Club domestic league appearances and goals

Stephen Philip Grapes (born 25 February 1953) is an English former professional footballer.

== Career ==
Grapes, a right-sided midfielder, began his career with his local team Norwich City, for whom he made 52 appearances and scored 4 goals. He made his league debut for the club during its promotion season of 1971–72. After he had a loan spell with AFC Bournemouth in 1975, he left Norwich permanently in 1976 to sign for Cardiff City for a fee of £7,000. Grapes spent six years at Ninian Park as the club struggled in the lower divisions and was released in 1982 following their relegation to division three. He joined Torquay United and later played for Bath City.
