= Ray Bishop =

Welsh footballer

Personal information
- Full name: Raymond John Bishop
- Date of birth: 24 November 1955 (age 70)
- Place of birth: Hengoed, Wales
- Height: 5 ft 8 in (1.73 m)
- Position: Forward

Senior career*
| Years | Team | Apps | (Gls) |
| 1977–1981 | Cardiff City | 101 | (26) |
| 1981–1982 | Newport County | 18 | (2) |
| 1982–1983 | Torquay United | 40 | (8) |
- * Club domestic league appearances and goals

Raymond John Bishop (born 24 November 1955) is a Welsh former professional footballer. During his career, he played over 150 games in the Football League for Cardiff City, Newport County and Torquay United.

== Career ==
Bishop, a forward, began his football career with Bargoed Youth Club. He was a Boys Club International for Wales, winning caps against England and Scotland in 1973, and played for Great Britain against Belgium.

He joined Welsh League side Tredomen at the age of 18. He moved on to Ton Pentre before joining Southern League side Cheltenham Town, while working as a Post Office engineer. He had a two-month spell on trial with Brighton & Hove Albion, then managed by Alan Mullery, but was unsuccessful and returned to Cheltenham from where he was signed by Cardiff City for a fee of £3,000 in January 1977. His league debut came in August the same year, and he went on to make 102 league appearances for the Bluebirds, scoring 33 goals.

On 26 February 1981, after losing his place in the Cardiff side, he moved to local rivals Newport County, costing £10,000, but could not settle suffering multiple injuries, making only 25 appearances, scoring 7, before moving on a free transfer to Torquay United in August 1982. He scored four times in his first three games for Torquay, but after getting injured in the third game never regained full fitness at Plainmoor and retired from football in 1984, having made 40 league appearances for Torquay, scoring 8 times.

Having finished his professional football career, he became a prolific property developer in the West country.
