= Keith Pontin =

Welsh footballer (1956–2020)

Personal information
- Full name: Keith Pontin
- Date of birth: 14 June 1956
- Place of birth: Pontyclun, Wales
- Date of death: 2 August 2020 (aged 64)
- Height: 6 ft 1 in (1.85 m)
- Position: Central defender

Senior career*
Years	Team	Apps	(Gls)
1976–1983	Cardiff City	193	(5)
1983–1985	Merthyr Tydfil		
1985–1991	Barry Town	189	(15)

International career
	Wales U21	1	(0)
1980	Wales	2	(0)
- * Club domestic league appearances and goals

Keith Pontin (14 June 1956 – 2 August 2020) was a Welsh professional footballer who played as a central defender. Pontin began his career with Cardiff City, making nearly 200 league appearances and earning two caps for the Welsh national team.

He later played for Merthyr Tydfil and Barry Town. With the latter, he won several Welsh Football League titles and was appointed club captain, winning several player awards during his spell there.

== Club career ==
Born in Pontyclun, Pontin began his career at Cardiff City, working his way through the youth system before making his debut in a 2–0 victory over Charlton Athletic on the opening day of the 1976–77 season. He returned to the reserves shortly afterwards due to the arrival of Paul Went from Portsmouth but was eventually recalled in September 1977 when Went was moved into a more attacking role. His impressive form over the next few seasons meant he missed very few matches for the Bluebirds and was called up for the Wales squad.

During the 1981–82 season he played in more matches than any other player in the squad but couldn't stop the club from being relegated. It was at the start of the following year that things turned sour for him at Ninian Park when he fell out with manager Len Ashurst after an argument and was allowed to leave the club to join Merthyr Tydfil.

He signed for Barry Town in 1985. Club historian Jeff McInery described the signing as "quite a coup for Barry at the time" given Pontin's playing history. He made his debut for the club against Minehead in the FA Cup. Pontin's performances for Barry led him to be voted the club's Player's Player of the Season three times, in 1988, 1989 and 1991, and the Club's Player of the Season in 1987. During this time, he also helped the club to win Division One of the Welsh Football League in three consecutive seasons between 1986 and 1989. In his later years with Barry, he was appointed club captain and also briefly acted as assistant manager under Mel Donovan before leaving in 1991 having made more than 200 appearances in all competitions.

== International career ==
Pontin earned one cap for Wales at under-21 level, and two for the senior team. He made his senior international debut in a 4–1 win over England on 17 May 1980. His second, and final, cap came four days later on 21 May in a 1–0 defeat to Scotland.

== Later life ==
Pontin was married with two daughters. At the age of 59, Pontin was diagnosed with dementia, which his family attribute to his football career. He died on 2 August 2020 at the age of 64. In 2022, a coroner's court in Pontypridd heard that a post-mortem examination found Pontin's cause of death was Chronic Traumatic Encephalopathy caused by repeated trauma to the head.
