= 1971–72 Cardiff City F.C. season =

Welsh football club season

Cardiff City
1971–72 season
- Chairman: Fred Dewey
- Manager: Jimmy Scoular
- Football League Second Division: 19th
- FA Cup: 5th round
- League Cup: 2nd round
- European Cup Winners Cup: 1st round
- Welsh Cup: Runners-up
- Top goalscorer: League: Brian Clark (21); All: Brian Clark (27)
- Highest home attendance: 23,692 (v Birmingham City, 1 April 1972)
- Lowest home attendance: 10,268 (v Portsmouth, 1 December 1971)
- Average home league attendance: 15,539
Home colours

The 1971–72 season was Cardiff City F.C.'s 45th season in the Football League. They competed in the 22-team Division Two, then the second tier of English football, finishing nineteenth.

== Players ==
Note: Flags indicate national team as defined under FIFA eligibility rules; some limited exceptions apply. Players may hold more than one non-FIFA nationality.

No.	Pos.	Nation	Player
--	GK	SCO	Jim Eadie
--	GK	NIR	Bill Irwin
--	GK	ENG	Frank Parsons
--	DF	ENG	Gary Bell
--	DF	ENG	David Carver
--	DF	WAL	Steve Derrett
--	DF	ENG	Ken Jones
--	DF	WAL	Richie Morgan
--	DF	SCO	Don Murray
--	DF	WAL	Freddie Pethard
--	MF	WAL	Alan Couch
--	MF	ENG	Alan Foggon

No.	Pos.	Nation	Player
--	MF	ENG	Ian Gibson
--	MF	ENG	Roger Hoy
--	MF	SCO	Billy Kellock
--	MF	ENG	Peter King
--	MF	WAL	Leighton Phillips
--	MF	WAL	Bryan Rees
--	MF	WAL	Nigel Rees
--	MF	ENG	Mel Sutton
--	MF	WAL	Tony Villars
--	MF	ENG	Bobby Woodruff
--	FW	ENG	Brian Clark
--	FW	WAL	John Parsons
--	FW	ENG	Alan Warboys

Key:
‡ On loan from another club * First appearance(s) for the club

- # = Squad number
- Pos = Playing position
- P = Number of games played
- G = Number of goals scored
- GK = Goalkeeper
- DF = Defender
- MF = Midfielder
- FW = Forward
- = Yellow cards
- = Red cards
- † Permanent player left club during the season
- ¤ Loaned to another club for part or all of season

Correct as of May 1972. Starting appearances are listed first, followed by substitute appearances in parentheses where applicable.

Pos	Name	P	G	P	G	P	G	P	G	P	G	P	G	A yellow card	A red card	Notes
Pos	Name	League		FA Cup		League Cup		Europe		Other		Total		Discipline		Notes
GK	Jim Eadie	9	0	0	0	2	0	2	0	0	0	13	0	0	0	
GK	Bill Irwin	31	0	5	0	0	0	0	0	5	0	41	0	0	0	
GK	Frank Parsons	2	0	0	0	0	0	0	0	0	0	2	0	0	0	
DF	David Carver	36	0	5	1	0	0	0	0	5	0	46	1	3	0	
DF	Gary Bell	30	0	5	0	2	0	2	0	4	0	43	0	3	0	
DF	Steve Derrett	5	0	0(1)	0	0	0	0	0	0	0	5(1)	0	0	0	
DF	Ken Jones	6	0	0	0	2	0	2	0	0	0	10	0	1	0	
DF	Richie Morgan	8	0	1	0	0	0	0	0	1	0	10	0	0	0	
DF	Don Murray	36	0	4	1	2	0	2	0	4	0	48	1	1	0	
DF	Freddie Pethard	11	0	0	0	0	0	0	0	1	0	12	0	0	0	
MF	Alan Couch	3	0	0	0	0	0	0	0	0	0	3	0	0	0	
MF	Alan Foggon	9(3)	0	4	0	1	1	0(1)	0	2	2	16(4)	3	1	0	
MF	Ian Gibson	40(1)	4	5	0	2	1	2	0	4	0	53(1)	5	4	0	
MF	Roger Hoy	7	0	0	0	1	0	0	0	0	0	8	0	0	0	
FW	Billy Kellock	5(1)	0	3	1	0	0	0	0	3	0	11(1)	1	1	0	
MF	Peter King	22(1)	4	4	1	0	0	2	0	4	0	32(1)	5	0	0	
MF	Leighton Phillips	41	1	5	0	2	0	2	0	5	0	56	1	3	0	
MF	Mel Sutton	30(1)	1	1	0	2	0	2	0	3	0	38(1)	1	4	0	
MF	Tony Villars	6(1)	0	0(1)	0	0	0	0	0	2	0	8(1)	0	1	0	
MF	Bobby Woodruff	34(2)	6	5	2	2	0	2	0	2(1)	1	46(3)	9	0	0	
FW	Brian Clark	42	21	5	2	2	1	2	1	5	2	56	28	0	0	
FW	John Parsons	5(6)	4	0(1)	0	0	0	0	0	0	0	5(7)	4	1	0	
FW	Bryan Rees	0	0	1	0	0	0	0	0	0	0	1	0	0	0	
FW	Nigel Rees	10(3)	0	0	0	0	0	0	0	1(1)	0	11(4)	0	0	0	
FW	Alan Warboys	34(4)	13	2(2)	0	2	0	2	0	4	2	44(6)	15	2	0	

Source.

== League standings ==
Pos	Team	Pld	W	D	L	GF	GA	GAv	Pts	Qualification or relegation
17	Orient	42	14	9	19	50	61	0.820	37	
18	Preston North End	42	12	12	18	52	58	0.897	36	
19	Cardiff City	42	10	14	18	56	69	0.812	34	
20	Fulham	42	12	10	20	45	68	0.662	34	
21	Charlton Athletic (R)	42	12	9	21	55	77	0.714	33	Relegation to the Third Division

Rules for classification: 1) Points; 2) Goal average; 3) Goals scored
(R) Relegated

=== Results by round ===
Round	1	2	3	4	5	6	7	8	9	10	11	12	13	14	15	16	17	18	19	20	21	22	23	24	25	26	27	28	29	30	31	32	33	34	35	36	37	38	39	40	41	42
Ground	H	A	A	H	A	A	H	A	H	A	H	A	H	A	H	A	H	A	H	A	H	A	H	A	A	H	A	H	H	A	H	A	H	H	A	A	H	H	A	H	H	A
Result	D	L	L	D	L	D	W	L	L	W	L	L	W	L	D	L	L	L	W	D	W	L	W	D	L	L	D	D	W	D	D	D	W	D	L	D	W	W	L	L	D	L
Position	13	17	20	20	20	19	16	17	19	18	20	21	21	21	21	21	22	22	21	21	21	21	20	20	20	21	21	21	21	21	21	21	21	21	21	21	20	19	19	19	19	19
Points	1	1	1	2	2	3	5	5	5	7	7	7	9	9	10	10	10	10	12	13	15	15	17	18	18	18	19	20	22	23	24	25	27	28	28	29	31	33	33	33	34	34

Source: Competitive matches
A = Away; H = Home; W = Win; D = Draw; L = Loss

== Fixtures and results ==
=== Second Division ===
14 August 1971 1	Cardiff City	2–2	Burnley	Cardiff
15:00	Brian Clark 9'; Brian Clark 36'		66' Frank Casper; 82' (o.g.) David Carver	Stadium: Ninian Park; Attendance: 23026; Referee: Ray Tinkler (Boston)

16 August 1971 2	Blackpool	3–0	Cardiff City	Blackpool
19:30	Tony Green (?); Glyn James (?)			Stadium: Bloomfield Road; Attendance: 19253; Referee: Dennis Pugh (Chester)

21 August 1971 3	Orient	4–1	Cardiff City	London
15:00	Ian Bowyer 27'; Terry Mancini 47'; Ian Bowyer 60'; Ian Bowyer 65'		68' (o.g.) Terry Mancini	Stadium: Brisbane Road; Attendance: 7824; Referee: Ivan Robinson

28 August 1971 4	Cardiff City	1–1	Hull City	Cardiff
15:00	Alan Warboys (?)		19' Stuart Pearson	Stadium: Ninian Park; Attendance: 17136; Referee: Bill Hall (Preston)

31 August 1971 5	Bristol City	2–0	Cardiff City	Bristol
19:30	John Galley 22'; Gerry Gow 51'			Stadium: Ashton Gate; Attendance: 23525; Referee: John Hunting (Leicester)

4 September 1971 6	Watford	2–2	Cardiff City	London
15:00	Larry McGettigan 44'; Duncan Welbourne 80'		83' John Parsons; 85' Brian Clark	Stadium: Vicarage Road; Attendance: 10233; Referee: Cliff Howell (North Shields)

11 September 1971 7	Cardiff City	3–2	Sheffield Wednesday	Cardiff
15:00	Alan Warboys 23'; Brian Clark 77'; Alan Warboys 84'		55' Tommy Craig; 60' Brian Joicey	Stadium: Ninian Park; Attendance: 17195; Referee: Gerry Jones (Lancaster)

18 September 1971 8	Middlesbrough	1–0	Cardiff City	Middlesbrough
15:00	Bill Gates 22'			Stadium: Ayresome Park; Attendance: 18288; Referee: Roy Capey (Madeley Heath)

25 September 1971 9	Cardiff City	0–1	Swindon Town	Cardiff
15:00		Swindon report	75' Chris Jones	Stadium: Ninian Park; Attendance: 16292; Referee: Keith Walker (Maidstone)

2 October 1971 10	Preston North End	1–2	Cardiff City	Preston
	Bobby Ham 6'		78' Peter King; 86' Brian Clark	Stadium: Deepdale; Attendance: 13511; Referee: Ron Challis (Tonbridge)

9 October 1971 11	Cardiff City	1–2	Millwall	Cardiff
15:00	Brian Clark 43'		79' Derek Smethurst; 84' Barry Bridges	Stadium: Ninian Park; Attendance: 17954; Referee: Ted Jolly (Manchester)

16 October 1971 12	Burnley	3–0	Cardiff City	Burnley
15:00	Frank Casper 40', 64'; Dave Thomas 85'			Stadium: Turf Moor; Attendance: 12249; Referee: Vernon Batty (Helsby Cheshire)

23 October 1971 13	Cardiff City	6–1	Charlton Athletic	Cardiff
15:00	Brian Clark 14', 73'; John Parsons 49', 75'; Ian Gibson 62' (pen.); Paul Went 83' (o.g.)		55' Paul Davies	Stadium: Ninian Park; Attendance: 13092; Referee: Ray Toseland (Kettering)

30 October 1971 14	Norwich City	2–1	Cardiff City	Norwich
15:00	David Cross 2'; Dave Stringer 83'		65' Brian Clark	Stadium: Carrow Road; Attendance: 20814; Referee: John Homewood (Sunbury-On-Thames)

6 November 1971 15	Cardiff City	0–0	Queens Park Rangers	Cardiff
15:00				Stadium: Ninian Park; Attendance: 16114; Referee: Bob Armstrong (Ilkley)

13 November 1971 16	Fulham	4–3	Cardiff City	London
15:00	Roger Cross 6'; Jimmy Conway 21'; Steve Earle 58'; Jimmy Conway 82'		10' Alan Warboys; 17' Brian Clark; 78' Brian Clark	Stadium: Craven Cottage; Attendance: 10700; Referee: Syd Kayley (Preston)

20 November 1971 17	Cardiff City	1–2	Sunderland	Cardiff
15:00	Ian Gibson 24'		39' Billy Hughes; 45' Bobby Kerr	Stadium: Ninian Park; Attendance: 12735; Referee: Peter Walters (Bridgewater)

27 November 1971 18	Carlisle United	2–1	Cardiff City	Carlisle
	Bobby Owen 2'; Dennis Martin 78'		71' John Parsons	Stadium: Brunton Park; Attendance: 6835; Referee: Cliff Howell (North Shields)

1 December 1971 19	Cardiff City	3–2	Portsmouth	Cardiff
19:30	Ian Gibson 37' (pen.); Brian Clark 40'; Bobby Woodruff 82'		55' Ray Hiron; 80' Mike Trebilcock	Stadium: Ninian Park; Attendance: 10268; Referee: Gordon Kew (Leeds)

11 December 1971 20	Luton Town	2–2	Cardiff City	Luton
15:00	Peter Anderson 26'; Don Givens 77' (pen.)		34' Leighton Phillips; 81' Brian Clark	Stadium: Kenilworth Road; Attendance: 10606; Referee: Ken Burns (Stourbridge)

18 December 1971 21	Cardiff City	2–0	Watford	Cardiff
15:00	Peter King 41'; Alan Warboys 56'			Stadium: Ninian Park; Attendance: 11113; Referee: Mike Kerkhof (Bicester)

27 December 1971 22	Birmingham City	3–0	Cardiff City	Birmingham
	Gary Pendrey 24'; Trevor Francis (?); Bob Hatton (?)			Stadium: St Andrew's; Attendance: 40793; Referee: Ricky Nicholson (Manchester)

1 January 1972 23	Cardiff City	1–0	Middlesbrough	Cardiff
15:00	Brian Clark 56'			Stadium: Ninian Park; Attendance: 12773; Referee: Charles Nicholls (Plymouth)

8 January 1972 24	Hull City	0–0	Cardiff City	Hull
15:00				Stadium: Boothferry Park; Attendance: 12678; Referee: Colin Fallon (Blackpool)

22 January 1972 25	Portsmouth	2–0	Cardiff City	Portsmouth
15:00	Mike Trebilcock 7'; George Ley 23'			Stadium: Fratton Park; Attendance: 11039; Referee: David Smith (Stonehouse, Gloucestershire)

29 January 1972 26	Cardiff City	3–4	Blackpool	Cardiff
15:00	Brian Clark 20'; Alan Warboys 48'; Ian Gibson 52'		12' (o.g.) Leighton Phillips; 17' Micky Burns; 42' (pen.) Alan Suddick; 79' Keith Dyson	Stadium: Ninian Park; Attendance: 11719; Referee: Dennis Turner (Cannock)

12 February 1972 27	Charlton Athletic	2–2	Cardiff City	London
	Paul Went 61'; Alan Peacock 88'		9' Bobby Woodruff; 43' Brian Clark	Stadium: The Valley; Attendance: 7526; Referee: Arthur Jones (Ormskirk)

19 February 1972 28	Cardiff City	0–0	Norwich City	Cardiff
15:00				Stadium: Ninian Park; Attendance: 17863; Referee: Ron Crabb (Exeter)

4 March 1972 29	Cardiff City	1–0	Fulham	Cardiff
15:00	Brian Clark 22'			Stadium: Ninian Park; Attendance: 13122; Referee: Harold Davey (Nottingham)

11 March 1972 30	Millwall	1–1	Cardiff City	London
	Derek Possee 58'		8' Alan Warboys	Stadium: The Den; Attendance: 13702; Referee: Ray Tinkler (Boston)

21 March 1972 31	Cardiff City	1–1	Oxford United	Cardiff
19:30	Brian Clark 11'		64' Colin Clarke	Stadium: Ninian Park; Attendance: 14499; Referee: Ken Burns (Stourbridge)

25 March 1972 32	Sheffield Wednesday	2–2	Cardiff City	Sheffield
15:00	John Sissons 41'; Tommy Craig 50' (pen.)		24' Alan Warboys; 32' Bobby Woodruff	Stadium: Hillsborough; Attendance: 12910; Referee: Bill Castle (Dudley)

29 March 1972 33	Cardiff City	5–2	Preston North End	Cardiff
19:30	Brian Clark (45s); Alan Warboys 40'; Peter King 47'; Alan Warboys 85'; Alan Warboys 88'		18' Alan Tarbuck; 55' Alan Spavin	Stadium: Ninian Park; Attendance: 13394; Referee: Peter Walters (Bridgewater)

1 April 1972 34	Cardiff City	0–0	Birmingham City	Cardiff
15:00				Stadium: Ninian Park; Attendance: 23692; Referee: Charles Nicholls (Plymouth)

4 April 1972 35	Swindon Town	3–1	Cardiff City	Swindon
	Ray Bunkell 17'; Don Murray 72' (o.g.); Peter Noble 83'	Swindon report	15' Brian Clark	Stadium: County Ground; Attendance: 15393; Referee: HG New (Westbury-on-Trym, Bristol)

8 April 1972 36	Sunderland	1–1	Cardiff City	Sunderland
	Dave Watson 86'		87' Mel Sutton	Stadium: Roker Park; Attendance: 15224; Referee: Walter Johnson (Kendal)

12 April 1972 37	Cardiff City	1–0	Orient	Cardiff
19:30	Bobby Woodruff 33'			Stadium: Ninian Park; Attendance: 16769; Referee: Roger Kirkpatrick (Leicester)

15 April 1972 38	Cardiff City	3–1	Carlisle United	Cardiff
15:00	Peter King 33'; Brian Clark 82'; Bobby Woodruff 88'		(31s) Frank Barton	Stadium: Ninian Park; Attendance: 17734; Referee: Brian Daniels (Rainham)

22 April 1972 39	Oxford United	1–0	Cardiff City	Oxford
15:00	Brian Thompson 76'			Stadium: Manor Ground; Attendance: 8869; Referee: Ricky Nicholson (Manchester)

26 April 1972 40	Cardiff City	2–3	Bristol City	Cardiff
19:30	Alan Warboys 32'; Bobby Woodruff 82'		9' Peter Spiring; 20' (pen.) Gerry Gow; 63' Peter Spiring	Stadium: Ninian Park; Attendance: 17249; Referee: Derek Nippard (Bournemouth)

29 April 1972 41	Cardiff City	1–1	Luton Town	Cardiff
15:00	Alan Warboys 41'		44' Robin Wainwright	Stadium: Ninian Park; Attendance: 12587; Referee: Vernon Batty (Helsby Cheshire)

2 May 1972 42	Queens Park Rangers	3–0	Cardiff City	London
19:30	Mike Ferguson 57'; John O'Rourke 59'; Mick Leach 88'			Stadium: Loftus Road; Attendance: 8430; Referee: John Hunting (Leicester)

=== Football League Cup ===
8 September 1971 Round 2	West Ham United	1–1	Cardiff City	London
19:30	Billy Bonds 23'		64' Alan Foggon	Stadium: Upton Park; Attendance: 24420; Referee: Jack Taylor (Wolverhampton)

22 September 1971 Round 2 (Replay)	Cardiff City	1–2	West Ham United	Cardiff
19:30	Brian Clark 64'		82', 83' Geoff Hurst	Stadium: Ninian Park; Attendance: 30109; Referee: Jack Taylor (Wolverhampton)

=== FA Cup ===
15 January 1972 Round 3	Sheffield United	1–3	Cardiff City	Sheffield
	Ian Mackenzie 33'		19' Don Murray; 88' David Carver; 93' Bobby Woodruff	Stadium: Bramall Lane; Attendance: 29342

9 February 1972 Round 4	Cardiff City	1–1	Sunderland	Cardiff
19:30	Peter King 25'		67' (pen.) Brian Chambers	Stadium: Ninian Park; Attendance: 26963; Referee: Ted Jolly (Manchester)

14 February 1972 Round 4 (replay)	Sunderland	1–1	Cardiff City	Sunderland
14:00	Bobby Kerr 88'		26' Brian Clark	Stadium: Roker Park; Attendance: 39348; Referee: Tony Morrissey (Bramhall)

16 February 1972 Round 4 (replay 2)	Sunderland	1–3	Cardiff City	Manchester
14:15	Mick McGiven 26'		21' Brian Clark; 86' Bobby Woodruff; 90' Billy Kellock	Stadium: Maine Road; Attendance: 8868; Referee: Ray Tinkler (Boston)

26 February 1972 Round 5	Cardiff City	0–2	Leeds United	Cardiff
15:00			34' Johnny Giles; 83' Johnny Giles	Stadium: Ninian Park; Attendance: 50000; Referee: Keith Walker (Maidstone)

=== European Cup Winners Cup ===
15 September 1971 Round 1 (First Leg)	Dynamo Berlin	1–1	Cardiff City	Berlin
19:00	Harald Schutze 90'		78' Ian Gibson	Stadium: Friedrich-Ludwig-Jahn-Sportpark; Attendance: 11,651; Referee: Rolf Nyhus (Norway)

29 September 1971 Round 1 (SecondLeg)	Cardiff City	1–1 (a.e.t.) (2–2 agg.) (4–5 p)	Dynamo Berlin	Cardiff
19:30	Brian Clark 58'		62' Dieter Labes	Stadium: Ninian Park; Attendance: 12,676; Referee: Franz Geluck (Belgium)
	Penalties
	Ian Gibson (penalty scored); Don Murray (penalty missed); Peter King (penalty scored); Gary Bell (penalty scored); Bobby Woodruff (penalty scored)		(penalty scored) Norbert Johannsen; (penalty scored) Frank Terletzki; (penalty scored) Jochen Carow; (penalty scored) Manfred Becker; (penalty scored) Dieter Labes

=== Welsh Cup ===
3 January 1972 Round 5	Swansea City	0–2	Cardiff City	Swansea
19:30			(90s) Alan Warboys; 83' Brian Clark	Stadium: Vetch Field; Attendance: 14,391

22 February 1972 Round 6	Llanelli	0–1	Cardiff City	Llanelli
15:00			25' Alan Foggon	Stadium: Stebonheath Park; Attendance: 6,000

14 March 1972 Semi Final	Rhyl	1–2	Cardiff City	Rhyl
19:30	J Evans 74' (pen.)		43' Brian Clark; 70' Alan Warboys	Stadium: Belle Vue; Attendance: 5,000; Referee: Clive Thomas (Treorchy)

8 May 1972 Final (First leg)	Wrexham	2–1	Cardiff City	Wrexham
19:15	Albert Kinsey 34'; Graham Whittle 65' (pen.)	Wrexham report	90' Bobby Woodruff	Stadium: The Racecourse; Attendance: 6,984; Referee: Tom Reynolds (Swansea)

12 May 1972 Final (Second leg)	Cardiff City	1–1 (2–3 agg.)	Wrexham	Cardiff
19:30	Alan Foggon 50'	Wrexham report	53' Albert Kinsey	Stadium: Ninian Park; Attendance: 6,508; Referee: Tom Reynolds (Swansea)

== See also ==
- Cardiff City F.C. seasons

== Bibliography ==
- Hayes, Dean (2006). The Who's Who of Cardiff City. Breedon Books. ISBN 1-85983-462-0.
- Shepherd, Richard (2002). The Definitive Cardiff City F.C. Tony Brown. ISBN 1-899-46817-X.
- Crooks, John (1992). Cardiff City Football Club: Official History of the Bluebirds. Yore Publications. ISBN 0-9513321-8-X.
- "Football Club History Database – Cardiff City". Archived from the original on 30 December 2008.
- Welsh Football Data Archive
