= 1972–73 Cardiff City F.C. season =

Welsh football club season

Cardiff City
1972–73 season
- Chairman: Fred Dewey; David Goldstone
- Manager: Jimmy Scoular
- Football League Second Division: 20th
- FA Cup: 4th round
- League Cup: 1st round
- Welsh Cup: Winners
- Top goalscorer: League: Andy McCulloch (14); All: Andy McCulloch (19)'
- Highest home attendance: 22,012 (v Sunderland, 7 May 1973)
- Lowest home attendance: 6,259 (v Hull City, 9 May 1973)
- Average home league attendance: 11,634
Home colours

The 1972–73 season was Cardiff City F.C.'s 46th season in the Football League. They competed in the 22-team Division Two, then the second tier of English football, finishing twentieth.

The season also saw Cardiff-born Phil Dwyer, who would go on to break the club's appearance record, make his debut for the club.

== Players ==
Note: Flags indicate national team as defined under FIFA eligibility rules; some limited exceptions apply. Players may hold more than one non-FIFA nationality.

No.	Pos.	Nation	Player
--	GK	NIR	Bill Irwin
--	GK	ENG	Frank Parsons
--	DF	ENG	Gary Bell
--	DF	ENG	David Carver
--	DF	WAL	Phil Dwyer
--	DF	ENG	Roger Hoy
--	DF	ENG	John Impey
--	DF	NIR	Albert Larmour
--	DF	WAL	Peter Morgan
--	DF	WAL	Richie Morgan
--	DF	SCO	Don Murray
--	DF	WAL	Freddie Pethard
--	DF	WAL	David Powell
--	MF	ENG	Willie Anderson
--	MF	WAL	Alan Couch
--	MF	ENG	Alan Foggon

No.	Pos.	Nation	Player
--	MF	ENG	Ian Gibson
--	MF	SCO	Billy Kellock
--	MF	ENG	Peter King
--	MF	WAL	Leighton Phillips
--	MF	WAL	Gil Reece
--	MF	WAL	Nigel Rees
--	MF	WAL	Tony Villars
--	MF	ENG	Johnny Vincent
--	MF	ENG	Bobby Woodruff
--	FW	ENG	Brian Clark
--	FW	ENG	Andy McCulloch
--	FW	SCO	Jimmy McInch
--	FW	WAL	John Parsons
--	FW	WAL	Derek Showers
--	FW	ENG	Alan Warboys

Source.

== League standings ==
Pos	Team	Pld	W	D	L	GF	GA	GAv	Pts	Qualification or relegation
18	Carlisle United	42	11	12	19	50	52	0.962	34	
19	Preston North End	42	11	12	19	37	64	0.578	34	
20	Cardiff City	42	11	11	20	43	58	0.741	33	Qualification for the Cup Winners' Cup first round (Note: Cardiff City qualified for the Cup Winners' Cup first round as the 1972–73 Welsh Cup winners.)
21	Huddersfield Town (R)	42	8	17	17	36	56	0.643	33	Relegation to the Third Division
22	Brighton & Hove Albion (R)	42	8	13	21	46	83	0.554	29	Relegation to the Third Division

Rules for classification: 1) Points; 2) Goal average; 3) Goals scored
(R) Relegated

=== Results by round ===
Round	1	2	3	4	5	6	7	8	9	10	11	12	13	14	15	16	17	18	19	20	21	22	23	24	25	26	27	28	29	30	31	32	33	34	35	36	37	38	39	40	41	42
Ground	H	A	H	H	A	H	A	A	H	H	A	A	H	A	H	A	H	A	H	H	A	A	H	H	A	H	A	A	H	A	A	H	A	A	H	A	H	H	A	A	H	H
Result	W	L	L	W	L	L	L	L	L	D	L	D	W	L	W	D	W	L	W	W	D	L	L	W	L	W	D	L	W	L	L	L	D	D	D	L	D	W	L	D	D	L
Position	5	14	17	14	15	19	21	21	22	22	22	22	22	22	22	21	21	22	21	20	19	20	20	20	21	21	19	21	19	20	21	21	21	21	21	21	21	20	20	21	20	20
Points	2	2	2	4	4	4	4	4	4	5	5	6	8	8	10	11	13	13	15	17	18	18	18	20	20	22	23	23	25	25	25	25	26	27	28	28	29	31	31	32	33	33

Source: Competitive matches
A = Away; H = Home; W = Win; D = Draw; L = Loss

== Fixtures and results ==
=== Second Division ===
12 August 1972 1	Cardiff City	2–1	Luton Town	Cardiff
15:00	Gary Bell 44' (pen.); Alan Warboys 60'		39' (pen.) John Aston	Stadium: Ninian Park; Attendance: 16,634; Referee: Ivan Smith (Accrington)

19 August 1972 2	Portsmouth	3–1	Cardiff City	Portsmouth
15:00	Brian Lewis 65'; Norman Piper 80'; Richie Reynolds 89'		34' Derek Showers	Stadium: Fratton Park; Attendance: 14,069; Referee: Harold Davey (Nottingham)

26 August 1972 3	Cardiff City	1–2	Blackpool	Cardiff
15:00	Gary Bell 45' (pen.)		50' Keith Dyson; 73' Dave Lennard	Stadium: Ninian Park; Attendance: 12,401; Referee: Bill Castle (Dudley)

30 August 1972 4	Cardiff City	1–0	Millwall	Cardiff
19:30	Brian Clark 31'			Stadium: Ninian Park; Attendance: 10,116; Referee: Ray Toseland (Kettering)

2 September 1972 5	Oxford United	2–1	Cardiff City	Oxford
	Tommy Cassidy 18'; Steve Aylott 69'		4' Nigel Rees	Stadium: Manor Ground; Attendance: 8,087; Referee: Tommy Dawes (Norwich)

9 September 1972 6	Cardiff City	0–2	Aston Villa	Cardiff
15:00			13' Bruce Rioch; 24' Andy Lochhead	Stadium: Ninian Park; Attendance: 16,707; Referee: Harold Hackney (Barnsley)

16 September 1972 7	Carlisle United	4–0	Cardiff City	Carlisle
	Joe Laidlaw 19'; Ray Train 32'; Chris Balderstone 39'; Bobby Owen 89'			Stadium: Brunton Park; Attendance: 5,911; Referee: Dave Wallace (Crewe)

19 September 1972 8	Nottingham Forest	2–1	Cardiff City	Nottingham
19:30	Martin O'Neill 40'; Paul Richardson 60'	Forest report	85' Ian Gibson	Stadium: City Ground; Attendance: 6,414; Referee: Bob Matthewson (Worsley)

23 September 1972 9	Cardiff City	1–3	Bristol City	Cardiff
15:00	Gary Bell 22' (pen.)		9' (pen.) Gerry Gow; 12' John Galley; 70' Brian Drysdale	Stadium: Ninian Park; Attendance: 14,204; Referee: Tony Oliver (Leigh On Sea)

27 September 1972 10	Cardiff City	1–1	Brighton	Cardiff
19:30	Alan Foggon 24'		Eddie Spearritt	Stadium: Ninian Park; Attendance: 9,351; Referee: Harry New (Portsmouth)

30 September 1972 11	Queens Park Rangers	3–0	Cardiff City	London
15:00	Don Givens 44', 51' (pen.); Stan Bowles 65'			Stadium: Loftus Road; Attendance: 11,182; Referee: Harold Williams (Sheffleid)

7 October 1972 12	Orient	0–0	Cardiff City	London
15:00			(red card) Alan Foggon	Stadium: Brisbane Road; Attendance: 6,284; Referee: Bob Raby (Leeds)

14 October 1972 13	Cardiff City	2–0	Middlesbrough	Cardiff
15:00	Johnny Vincent 38'; Gary Bell 81' (pen.)			Stadium: Ninian Park; Attendance: 10,430; Referee: David Smith (Stonehouse)

21 October 1972 14	Burnley	3–0	Cardiff City	Burnley
15:00	Paul Fletcher 30', 64', 83' (pen.)			Stadium: Turf Moor; Attendance: 13,410; Referee: Roy Capey (Madeley Heath)

28 October 1972 15	Cardiff City	3–0	Preston North End	Cardiff
15:00	Andy McCulloch 40'; Bobby Woodruff 69', 79'			Stadium: Ninian Park; Attendance: 12,208; Referee: Gordon Kew (Leeds)

4 November 1972 16	Brighton	2–2	Cardiff City	Brighton
	Barry Bridges; Ken Beamish 30'		28' Don Murray; 88' Billy Kellock	Stadium: Goldstone Ground; Attendance: 16,387; Referee: John Thacker (Lincoln)

11 November 1972 17	Cardiff City	2–1	Nottingham Forest	Cardiff
15:00	Andy McCulloch 75'; Bobby Woodruff 87'	Forest report	88' Neil Martin	Stadium: Ninian Park; Attendance: 12,750; Referee: Malcolm Sinclair (Guildford)

18 November 1972 18	Huddersfield	2–1	Cardiff City	Huddersfield
15:00	Graham Pugh 9'; Dick Krzywicki 64'		74' Gil Reece	Stadium: Leeds Road; Attendance: 5,886; Referee: Arthur Jones (Ormskirk)

25 November 1972 19	Cardiff City	3–1	Fulham	Cardiff
15:00	Andy McCulloch 21', 77'; Bobby Woodruff 63'		67' Alan Mullery	Stadium: Ninian Park; Attendance: 9,960; Referee: Ken Wynn (Wolverhampton)

9 December 1972 20	Cardiff City	4–1	Sheffield Wednesday	Cardiff
15:00	Leighton Phillips 10', 31'; Bobby Woodruff 44', 52'		71' Willie Henderson	Stadium: Ninian Park; Attendance: 9,909; Referee: Mike Kerkhof (Bicester)

16 December 1972 21	Hull City	1–1	Cardiff City	Hull
15:00	John Kaye 82'		79' Billy Kellock	Stadium: Boothferry Park; Attendance: 5,875; Referee: Jack Wrennall (Chorley)

26 December 1972 22	Bristol City	1–0	Cardiff City	Bristol
15:00	Gerry Gow 65' (pen.)			Stadium: Ashton Gate; Attendance: 20,490; Referee: John Yates (Redditch)

29 December 1972 23	Cardiff City	0–2	Portsmouth	Cardiff
19:30			67' Eoin Hand; Ray Hiron	Stadium: Ninian Park; Attendance: 12,382; Referee: Arthur Hart (London)

19 January 1973 24	Cardiff City	2–0	Oxford United	Cardiff
19:30	Andy McCulloch 48', 78'			Stadium: Ninian Park; Attendance: 6,991; Referee: Alex Lees (Somerset)

27 January 1973 25	Aston Villa	2–0	Cardiff City	Birmingham
15:00	Ray Graydon 45' (pen.); Bruce Rioch 60'			Stadium: Villa Park; Attendance: 25,586; Referee: Alf Grey (Great Yarmouth)

10 February 1973 26	Cardiff City	1–0	Carlisle United	Cardiff
15:00	Andy McCulloch 45'			Stadium: Ninian Park; Attendance: 7,809; Referee: Jack Taylor (Wolverhampton)

17 February 1973 27	Luton Town	1–1	Cardiff City	Luton
15:00	Derek Hales 12'		50' Bobby Woodruff	Stadium: Kenilworth Road; Attendance: 10,442; Referee: Michael Lowe (Sheffield)

27 February 1973 28	Swindon Town	3–0	Cardiff City	Swindon
19:30	Rod Thomas 7'; David Powell 21' (o.g.); Ray Treacy 41'			Stadium: County Ground; Attendance: 9,770; Referee: Don Biddle (Bristol)

3 March 1973 29	Cardiff City	3–1	Orient	Cardiff
15:00	Andy McCulloch 20', 73'; Gary Bell 26' (pen.)		83' Mike Bullock	Stadium: Ninian Park; Attendance: 8,463; Referee: Peter Reeves (Leicester)

7 March 1973 30	Blackpool	1–0	Cardiff City	Blackpool
19:30	Billy Rafferty 71'			Stadium: Bloomfield Road; Attendance: 5,303; Referee: John Williams (Wrexham)

10 March 1973 31	Middlesbrough	2–0	Cardiff City	Middlesbrough
15:00	Peter Brine 12'; Alan Foggon 58'			Stadium: Ayresome Park; Attendance: 7,686

17 March 1973 32	Cardiff City	0–1	Burnley	Cardiff
15:00			3' Frank Casper	Stadium: Ninian Park; Attendance: 11,960; Referee: David Smith (Stonehouse)

24 March 1973 33	Preston North End	0–0	Cardiff City	Preston
15:00				Stadium: Deepdale; Attendance: 6,889; Referee: Ken Burns (Stourbridge)

31 March 1973 34	Fulham	1–1	Cardiff City	London
15:00	John Conway 10'		(18s) Andy McCulloch; (red card) Andy McCulloch	Stadium: Craven Cottage; Attendance: 6,262; Referee: Dennis Turner (Cannock)

7 April 1973 35	Cardiff City	1–1	Swindon Town	Cardiff
15:00	Andy McCulloch 4'		75' Ray Treacy	Stadium: Ninian Park; Attendance: 9,438; Referee: Bob Perkin (Stafford)

14 April 1973 36	Sheffield Wednesday	1–0	Cardiff City	Sheffield
15:00	Phil Dwyer 28' (o.g.)			Stadium: Hillsborough; Attendance: 10,952; Referee: Roger Kirkpatrick (Leicester)

18 April 1973 37	Cardiff City	0–0	Queens Park Rangers	Cardiff
19:30				Stadium: Ninian Park; Attendance: 11,958; Referee: Bob Matthewson (Worsley)

21 April 1973 38	Cardiff City	4–1	Huddersfield	Cardiff
15:00	Bobby Woodruff 5' (?); Gil Reece 45' (?)		Alan Gowling	Stadium: Ninian Park; Attendance: 12,379; Referee: Ron Challis (Tonbridge)

23 April 1973 39	Sunderland	2–1	Cardiff City	Sunderland
15:00	Dennis Tueart 68' (pen.); Billy Hughes 77'		31' Leighton Phillips	Stadium: Roker Park; Attendance: 27,551; Referee: George Hartley (Wakefield)

28 April 1973 40	Millwall	1–1	Cardiff City	London
15:00	Alf Wood 76'		82' Andy McCulloch	Stadium: The Den; Attendance: 7,811; Referee: Ray Toseland (Kettering)

7 May 1973 41	Cardiff City	1–1	Sunderland	Cardiff
19:30	Bobby Woodruff 38'		52' Vic Halom	Stadium: Ninian Park; Attendance: 22,012; Referee: Dave Wallace (Crewe)

9 May 1973 42	Cardiff City	0–2	Hull City	Cardiff
19:30			12', 79' Roy Greenwood	Stadium: Ninian Park; Attendance: 6,259; Referee: Derek Nippard (Bournemouth)

=== League Cup ===
16 August 1972 Round 1	Cardiff City	2–2	Bristol Rovers	Cardiff
19:30	Derek Showers 63'; Gary Bell 72' (pen.)		32' Wayne Jones; 86' Brian Godfrey	Stadium: Ninian Park; Attendance: 14,450; Referee: Ron Crabb (Exeter)

22 August 1972 Round 1 (Replay)	Bristol Rovers	3–1	Cardiff City	Bristol
19:30	Brian Godfrey 19'; Bruce Bannister 78'; Wayne Jones 90'		7' Brian Clark; (red card) Don Murray	Stadium: Eastville; Attendance: 14,550; Referee: Ken Baker (Rugby)

=== FA Cup ===
13 January 1973 Round 3	Scunthorpe United	2–3	Cardiff City	Scunthorpe
15:00	Duncan Welbourne 61'; Harry Kirk 75'		13' Billy Kellock; 64' Andy McCulloch; 88' Leighton Phillips	Stadium: Old Show Ground; Attendance: 6,379; Referee: Ken Burns (Stourbridge)

3 February 1973 Round 4	Bolton Wanderers	2–2	Cardiff City	Bolton
15:00	Gary Jones 40'; John Ritson 84'; Warwick Rimmer (red card)		80' Billy Kellock; 95' Leighton Phillips; (red card) Gil Reece	Stadium: Burnden Park; Attendance: 24,729; Referee: Dave Wallace (Crewe)

7 February 1973 Round 4 (replay)	Cardiff City	1–1	Bolton Wanderers	Cardiff
	Andy McCulloch 27'		67' Gary Jones	Stadium: Ninian Park; Attendance: 14,849; Referee: Dave Wallace (Crewe)

12 February 1973 Round 4 (2nd replay)	Bolton Wanderers	1–0	Cardiff City	West Bromwich
	Stuart Lee 35'			Stadium: The Hawthorns; Attendance: 6,361; Referee: Roger Kirkpatrick (Leicester)

=== Welsh Cup ===
3 January 1973 Round 4	Aberystwyth Town	1–7	Cardiff City	Aberystwyth
14:15	Whitney		1' Andy McCulloch; Andy McCulloch; 24' Gil Reece; Gil Reece; 30' Johnny Vincent; Bobby Woodruff; Bobby Woodruff	Attendance: 3,500; Referee: John Williams (Wrexham)

20 February 1973 Round 5	Newport County	1–3	Cardiff City	Newport
19:15	Wynne Hooper 70'		3' Johnny Vincent; 10' Leighton Phillips; 43' Derek Showers	Stadium: Somerton Park; Attendance: 11,350; Referee: Tom Reynolds (Swansea)

21 March 1973 Semi Final	Chester City	0–1	Cardiff City	Chester
19:30			68' Andy McCulloch	Stadium: Sealand Road; Attendance: 2,158; Referee: John Williams (Wrexham)

4 April 1973 Final (First leg)	Bangor City	1–0	Cardiff City	Bangor
19:30	Tony Marsden 69'			Stadium: Farrar Road; Attendance: 5,005; Referee: John Williams (Wrexham)

11 April 1973 Final (Second leg)	Cardiff City	5–0 (5–1 agg.)	Bangor City	Cardiff
	Gil Reece 15', 49', 73'; Leighton Phillips 16'; Gary Bell 79'			Stadium: Ninian Park; Attendance: 4,679; Referee: John Williams (Wrexham)

== See also ==
- Cardiff City F.C. seasons

== Bibliography ==
- Hayes, Dean (2006). The Who's Who of Cardiff City. Breedon Books. ISBN 1-85983-462-0.
- Shepherd, Richard (2002). The Definitive Cardiff City F.C. Tony Brown. ISBN 1-899-46817-X.
- Crooks, John (1992). Cardiff City Football Club: Official History of the Bluebirds. Yore Publications. ISBN 0-9513321-8-X.
- "Football Club History Database – Cardiff City". Archived from the original on 30 December 2008.
- Welsh Football Data Archive
