= 1970–71 Cardiff City F.C. season =

Welsh football club season

Cardiff City
1970–71 season
- Chairman: Fred Dewey
- Manager: Jimmy Scoular
- Football League Second Division: 3rd
- FA Cup: 4th round
- League Cup: 2nd round
- European Cup Winners Cup: Quarter-finals
- Welsh Cup: Winners
- Top goalscorer: League: Brian Clark (15); All: Brian Clark (22)
- Highest home attendance: 26,210 (v Luton Town, 28 November 1970)
- Lowest home attendance: 14,736 (v Oxford United, 6 February 1971)
- Average home league attendance: 21,575
Home colours

The 1970–71 season was Cardiff City F.C.'s 44th season in the Football League. They competed in the 22-team Division Two, then the second tier of English football, finishing third.

The club's season was disrupted by the sale of John Toshack to Liverpool in November, breaking up the Toshack-Brian Clark strike partnership which had scored countless goals for the club in recent years. Despite this the team reached the quarter-finals of the European Cup Winners Cup before losing 2–1 on aggregate to Spanish side Real Madrid, after winning the first leg 1–0 at their home ground Ninian Park, a result that has since gone on to become one of the most famous moments in the club's history.

== Players ==
First team squad. Note: Flags indicate national team as defined under FIFA eligibility rules; some limited exceptions apply. Players may hold more than one non-FIFA nationality.

No.	Pos.	Nation	Player
--	GK	SCO	Jim Eadie
--	GK	ENG	Frank Parsons
--	DF	ENG	Gary Bell
--	DF	ENG	David Carver
--	DF	WAL	Steve Derrett
--	DF	ENG	Brian Harris
--	DF	SCO	Don Murray
--	MF	SCO	Ian Gibson
--	MF	WAL	Barrie Jones
--	MF	ENG	Peter King

No.	Pos.	Nation	Player
--	MF	WAL	Leighton Phillips
--	MF	ENG	Mel Sutton
--	MF	ENG	Bobby Woodruff
--	FW	ENG	Ronnie Bird
--	FW	ENG	Brian Clark
--	FW	WAL	John Parsons
--	FW	WAL	Nigel Rees
--	FW	WAL	Derek Showers
--	FW	WAL	John Toshack
--	FW	ENG	Alan Warboys

Key:
‡ On loan from another club * First appearance(s) for the club

- # = Squad number
- Pos = Playing position
- P = Number of games played
- G = Number of goals scored
- GK = Goalkeeper
- DF = Defender
- MF = Midfielder
- FW = Forward
- = Yellow cards
- = Red cards
- † Permanent player left club during the season
- ¤ Loaned to another club for part or all of season

Correct as of May 1971. Starting appearances are listed first, followed by substitute appearances in parentheses where applicable.

Pos	Name	P	G	P	G	P	G	P	G	P	G	P	G	A yellow card	A red card	Notes
Pos	Name	League		FA Cup		League Cup		Europe		Other		Total		Discipline		Notes
GK	Jim Eadie	32	0	2	0	0	0	4	0	7	0	45	0	0	0	
GK	Frank Parsons	10	0	0	0	1	0	2	0	0	0	13	0	0	0	
DF	David Carver	42	1	2	0	1	0	6	0	7	0	58	1	0	0	
DF	Gary Bell	42	1	2	0	1	0	6	0	7	0	58	1	0	0	
DF	Steve Derrett	5(1)	1	0	0	0	0	0	0	1	1	6(1)	2	0	0	
DF	Brian Harris	25(1)	0	2	0	1	0	4(1)	0	2	0	0	0	0	0	
DF	Don Murray	42	1	2	0	1	0	6	0	7	1	58	2	0	0	
MF	Ian Gibson	40	6	1	0	1	0	6	2	6(1)	4	54(1)	12	0	0	
MF	Peter King	41	5	2	1	1	0	6	2	6(1)	2	56(1)	10	0	0	
MF	Leighton Phillips	29(1)	3	2	0	0	0	3(2)	1	7	0	41(3)	4	0	0	
MF	Mel Sutton	41	2	2	0	1	0	6	1	4	0	54	3	0	0	
MF	Bobby Woodruff	33(3)	3	2	0	1	0	6	1	6	1	48(3)	5	0	0	
FW	Ronnie Bird	3(2)	0	0	0	0(1)	0	0	0	4	1	7(3)	1	0	0	
FW	Brian Clark	33(2)	15	1(1)	0	1	0	5(1)	4	6	3	46(4)	22	0	0	
FW	John Parsons	1(2)	2	0	0	0	0	0	0	2(1)	2	3(3)	4	0	0	
FW	Nigel Rees	9	0	1(1)	0	0	0	2	0	2	1	14(1)	1	0	0	
FW	Derek Showers	1	0	0	0	0	0	0	0	0	0	1	0	0	0	
FW	John Toshack	16	8	0	0	1	0	4	5	0	0	21	13	0	0	
FW	Alan Warboys	17	13	1	0	0	0	0	0	3	0	21	13	0	0	

== League standings ==
Pos	Team	Pld	W	D	L	GF	GA	GAv	Pts	Qualification or relegation
1	Leicester City (C, P)	42	23	13	6	57	30	1.900	59	Promotion to the First Division
2	Sheffield United (P)	42	21	14	7	73	39	1.872	56	Promotion to the First Division
3	Cardiff City	42	20	13	9	64	41	1.561	53	Qualification for the Cup Winners' Cup first round
4	Carlisle United	42	20	13	9	65	43	1.512	53	Qualification for the Watney Cup
5	Hull City	42	19	13	10	54	41	1.317	51	

Rules for classification: 1) Points; 2) Goal average; 3) Goals scored
(C) Champions; (P) Promoted

=== Results by round ===
Round	1	2	3	4	5	6	7	8	9	10	11	12	13	14	15	16	17	18	19	20	21	22	23	24	25	26	27	28	29	30	31	32	33	34	35	36	37	38	39	40	41	42
Ground	A	H	A	A	H	H	A	H	A	H	A	H	A	H	H	A	H	A	H	A	H	A	H	H	A	H	A	H	A	H	A	H	A	H	H	A	A	H	A	A	H	A
Result	W	D	W	L	D	W	W	D	D	L	W	D	D	W	W	W	W	L	D	L	W	L	D	W	W	W	W	D	D	W	D	W	L	W	W	D	D	L	W	L	W	L
Position		6	1	5	2	1	1	1	2	5	5	6	5	4	4	3	2	3	3	4	4	4	5	5	3	3	2	2	2	1	2	1	3	2	2	2	2	3	3	3	3	3
Points	2	3	5	5	6	8	10	11	12	12	14	15	16	18	20	22	24	24	25	25	27	27	28	30	32	34	36	37	38	40	41	43	43	45	47	48	49	49	51	51	53	53

Source: Competitive matches
A = Away; H = Home; W = Win; D = Draw; L = Loss

== Fixtures & Results ==
=== Second Division ===
15 August 1970 1	Leicester City	0–1	Cardiff City	Leicester
15:00			41' Brian Clark	Stadium: Filbert Street; Attendance: 27,578; Referee: Derek Nippard (Bournemouth)

22 August 1970 2	Cardiff City	2–2	Millwall	Cardiff
15:00	John Toshack 12'; Peter King 56'		63' Derek Possee; 89' Harry Cripps	Stadium: Ninian Park; Attendance: 25,283; Referee: Syd Kayley (Preston)

26 August 1970 3	Sheffield Wednesday	1–2	Cardiff City	Sheffield
19:30	Mick Prendergast 10'		11' Brian Clark; 23' Mel Sutton	Stadium: Hillsborough; Attendance: 16,896; Referee: Gordon Hill

29 August 1970 4	Bristol City	1–0	Cardiff City	Bristol
15:00	Gerry Sharpe 84'			Stadium: Ashton Gate; Attendance: 24,969; Referee: Gordon Kew (Leeds)

2 September 1970 5	Cardiff City	1–1	Sheffield United	Cardiff
19:30	Brian Clark 25'		68' Alan Woodward	Stadium: Ninian Park; Attendance: 21,455; Referee: Charles Nicholls (Plymouth)

5 September 1970 6	Cardiff City	2–0	Birmingham City	Cardiff
15:00	John Toshack 25', 35'			Stadium: Ninian Park; Attendance: 22,081; Referee: Tony Oliver (Leigh On Sea)

12 September 1970 7	Bolton Wanderers	0–2	Cardiff City	Bolton
15:00			44' Ian Gibson; 78' Brian Clark	Stadium: Burnden Park; Attendance: 10,777; Referee: John Thacker (Scarborough)

19 September 1970 8	Cardiff City	1–1	Norwich City	Cardiff
15:00	Brian Clark 42'		68' Albert Bennett	Stadium: Ninian Park; Attendance: 23,768; Referee: Harold Davey (Nottingham)

26 September 1970 9	Orient	0–0	Cardiff City	London
15:00				Stadium: Brisbane Road; Attendance: 11992; Referee: Vince James (York)

3 October 1970 10	Cardiff City	3–4	Middlesbrough	Cardiff
15:00	Brian Clark 30'; Bobby Woodruff 53'; Peter King 57'		20' John Hickton; 63' Willie Maddren; 69' Joe Laidlaw; 86' Hugh McIlmoyle	Stadium: Ninian Park; Attendance: 21072; Referee: Ron Challis (Tonbridge)

10 October 1970 11	Watford	0–1	Cardiff City	London
15:00			71' Brian Clark	Stadium: Vicarage Road; Attendance: 16224; Referee: Colin Fallon (Blackpool)

17 October 1970 12	Cardiff City	2–2	Leicester City	Cardiff
15:00	Ian Gibson 29' (pen.); David Carver 90'		48' John Farrington; 59' John Sjoberg	Stadium: Ninian Park; Attendance: 25968; Referee: Harold Williams (Sheffleid)

24 October 1970 13	Carlisle United	1–1	Cardiff City	Carlisle
	Chris Balderstone 62'		71' John Toshack	Stadium: Brunton Park; Attendance: 10955; Referee: David Laing (Preston)

28 October 1970 14	Cardiff City	1–0	Portsmouth	Cardiff
19:30	John Toshack 62'			Stadium: Ninian Park; Attendance: 18529; Referee: Jack Taylor (Wolverhampton)

31 October 1970 15	Cardiff City	5–1	Hull City	Cardiff
15:00	John Toshack 5', 15', 59'; Ian Gibson 66'; Leighton Phillips 83'		18' Geoff Barker	Stadium: Ninian Park; Attendance: 21856; Referee: Roy Darlington (Runcorn)

7 November 1970 16	Queens Park Rangers	0–1	Cardiff City	London
15:00			Leighton Phillips	Stadium: Loftus Road; Attendance: 13266; Referee: Ron Barker (Crewe)

14 November 1970 17	Cardiff City	4–1	Blackburn Rovers	Cardiff
15:00	Peter King (28s); Brian Clark 16', 70'; Bobby Woodruff 41'		72' Knighton	Stadium: Ninian Park; Attendance: 18238; Referee: Jim Finney (Hereford)

21 November 1970 18	Charlton Athletic	2–1	Cardiff City	London
	Dick Plumb 32'; Dennis Bond 76'		81' Bobby Woodruff; (substituted on) Ronnie Bird (substituted off) Peter King	Stadium: The Valley; Attendance: 10762; Referee: John Hunting (Leicester)

28 November 1970 19	Cardiff City	0–0	Luton Town	Cardiff
15:00				Stadium: Ninian Park; Attendance: 26689; Referee: Ivan Smith (Accrington)

5 December 1970 20	Oxford United	1–0	Cardiff City	Oxford
15:00	Nigel Cassidy 12'		(substituted on) Leighton Phillips (substituted off) Derek Showers	Stadium: Manor Ground; Attendance: 12206; Referee: Bill Hall (Preston)

12 December 1970 21	Cardiff City	3–1	Sunderland	Cardiff
14:30	Richie Pitt 35' (o.g.); Leighton Phillips 66'; Ian Gibson 87'		57' Joe Baker	Stadium: Ninian Park; Attendance: 15639; Referee: Arthur Hart (London)

19 December 1970 22	Millwall	2–1	Cardiff City	London
15:00	Barry Bridges 16', 76'		68' Brian Clark	Stadium: The Den; Attendance: 8591; Referee: Ted Jolly (Manchester)

26 December 1970 23	Cardiff City	1–1	Swindon Town	Cardiff
15:00	Mel Sutton 68'	Swindon report	36' Don Rogers	Stadium: Ninian Park; Attendance: 24813; Referee: John Yates (Redditch)

9 January 1971 24	Cardiff City	4–0	Sheffield Wednesday	Cardiff
15:00	Alan Warboys 38', 78'; Peter King 67'; Gary Bell 85'			Stadium: Ninian Park; Attendance: 21464; Referee: Brian H Daniels (Rainham)

16 January 1971 25	Portsmouth	1–3	Cardiff City	Portsmouth
15:00	Youlden 67'		3' Don Murray; 27', 69' Alan Warboys	Stadium: Fratton Park; Attendance: 24747; Referee: Roy Capey (Madeley Heath)

6 February 1971 26	Cardiff City	1–0	Oxford United	Cardiff
15:00	John Parsons 78'; (substituted on) John Parsons (substituted off) Mel Sutton			Stadium: Ninian Park; Attendance: 14736; Referee: Dennis Turner (Cannock)

13 February 1971 27	Sunderland	0–4	Cardiff City	Sunderland
15:00			24' Brian Clark; 29' (o.g.) Cecil Irwin; 88' Ian Gibson 67' John Parsons (substituted on) John Parsons (substituted off) Alan Warboys	Stadium: Roker Park; Attendance: 11566; Referee: Tony Morrissey (Bramhall)

20 February 1971 28	Cardiff City	1–1	Charlton Athletic	Cardiff
15:00	Ian Gibson 26' (pen.)		53' Dave Shipperley	Stadium: Ninian Park; Attendance: 18034; Referee: Ricky Nicholson (Manchester)

27 February 1971 29	Hull City	1–1	Cardiff City	Hull
15:00	David Carver 23' (o.g.)		66' Alan Warboys; (substituted on) Bobby Woodruff (substituted off) Brian Clark	Stadium: Boothferry Park; Attendance: 25091; Referee: Lyn Ashton (Ilkeston)

6 March 1971 30	Cardiff City	4–0	Carlisle United	Cardiff
15:00	Alan Warboys (2.10), 9', 43' (?)			Stadium: Ninian Park; Attendance: 22502; Referee: Peter R Walters (Bridgewater)

13 March 1971 31	Blackburn Rovers	1–1	Cardiff City	Blackburn
	Freddie Goodwin 70'		26' Brian Clark	Stadium: Ewood Park; Attendance: 10562; Referee: Maurice Fussey (Retford, Nottinghamshire)

20 March 1971 32	Cardiff City	1–0	Queens Park Rangers	Cardiff
15:00	Alan Warboys 45'			Stadium: Ninian Park; Attendance: 23123; Referee: Dennis Pugh (Chester)

27 March 1971 33	Birmingham City	2–0	Cardiff City	Birmingham
	Trevor Francis 4'; Phil Summerill 76'		(substituted on) Brian Clark (substituted off) Nigel Rees	Stadium: St Andrews; Attendance: 49025; Referee: Ray Tinkler (Boston)

3 April 1971 34	Cardiff City	1–0	Bristol City	Cardiff
18:30	Ken Wimshurst (3.48)			Stadium: Ninian Park; Attendance: 24687; Referee: John Hunting (Leicester)

7 April 1971 35	Cardiff City	1–0	Bolton Wanderers	Cardiff
19:30	Brian Clark 56'; (substituted on) Brian Harris (substituted off) Ronnie Bird			Stadium: Ninian Park; Attendance: 21305; Referee: Jim Finney (Hereford)

10 April 1971 36	Swindon Town	2–2	Cardiff City	Swindon
15:00	Steve Peplow 5'; Roger Smart 64'	Swindon report	6', 13' Alan Warboys	Stadium: County Ground; Attendance: 21158; Referee: Keith Styles (Barnsley)

13 April 1971 37	Middlesbrough	1–1	Cardiff City	Middlesbrough
19:15	Downing 2'		54' Peter King; (substituted on) Steve Derrett (substituted off) Ian Gibson	Stadium: Ayresome Park; Attendance: 19559; Referee: Gordon Kew (Leeds)

17 April 1971 38	Cardiff City	0–1	Watford	Cardiff
15:00			60' Woods	Stadium: Ninian Park; Attendance: 26536; Referee: Ken Burns (Stourbridge)

24 April 1971 39	Norwich City	1–2	Cardiff City	Norwich
15:00	Peter Silvester 77'		28' Brian Clark; 42' Alan Warboys	Stadium: Carrow Road; Attendance: 15607; Referee: Tony Oliver (Leigh On Sea)

27 April 1971 40	Sheffield United	5–1	Cardiff City	Sheffield
19:30	Bill Dearden 5', 82'; John Flynn 33'; Tony Currie 55'; Gil Reece 66'		43' Steve Derrett; (substituted on) Bobby Woodruff (substituted off) Leighton Phillips	Stadium: Bramall Lane; Attendance: 42963; Referee: Ricky Nicholson (Manchester)

1 May 1971 41	Cardiff City	1–0	Orient	Cardiff
15:00	Brian Clark 25'; (substituted on) Bobby Woodruff (substituted off) Peter King			Stadium: Ninian Park; Referee: Derek Nippard (Bournemouth)

4 May 1971 42	Luton Town	3–0	Cardiff City	Luton
19:30	Malcolm Macdonald 19', 58', 59'			Stadium: Kenilworth Road; Referee: Pat Partridge (Middlesbrough)

=== League Cup ===
9 September 1970 First Round	Queens Park Rangers	4–0	Cardiff City	London
19:30	Barry Bridges (?); Frank Saul (?); Rodney Marsh (?); Terry Venables (?)			Stadium: Loftus Road; Attendance: 15,026

=== FA Cup ===
2 January 1971 Third Round	Cardiff City	1–0	Brighton & Hove Albion	Cardiff
15:00	Peter King 3'			Stadium: Ninian Park; Attendance: 19,338; Referee: Ken Wynn (Wolverhampton)

23 January 1971 Fourth Round	Cardiff City	0–2	Brentford	Cardiff
15:00			Jackie Graham 29'; John Docherty 50'	Stadium: Ninian Park; Attendance: 23,335; Referee: Ken Baker (Rugby)

=== European Cup Winners Cup ===
16 September 1970 One (First leg)	Cardiff City	8–0	Pezoporikos Larnaca	Cardiff
19:30	Mel Sutton 17'; Ian Gibson 32'; Peter King 35'; Bobby Woodruff 41'; Brian Clark 44', 70'; John Toshack 55', 79'			Stadium: Ninian Park; Attendance: 12,984; Referee: Jacques Colling (Luxembourg)

30 September 1970 One (Second leg)	Pezoporikos Larnaca	0–0 (0–8 agg.)	Cardiff City	Larnaca
15:30				Stadium: GSZ Stadium; Attendance: 2,100; Referee: Petar Nikolov (Bulgaria)

21 October 1970 Two (first leg)	Cardiff City	5–1	Nantes	Cardiff
19:30	John Toshack 9', 38'; Ian Gibson 10'; Peter King 76'; Leighton Phillips 80'		1' Philippe Gondet	Stadium: Ninian Park; Attendance: 17,905; Referee: Wolfgang Riedel (East Germany)

4 November 1970 Two (second leg)	Nantes	1–2 (2–7 agg.)	Cardiff City	Nantes
	Bernard Blanchet 83'		12'John Toshack; 76' Brian Clark	Stadium: Stade Malakoff; Attendance: 10,000; Referee: Timoleon Latsios (Greece)

10 March 1971 Quarter Final (first leg)	Cardiff City	1–0	Real Madrid	Cardiff
19:30	Brian Clark 31'			Stadium: Ninian Park; Attendance: 47,500; Referee: Vital Loraux (Belgium)

24 March 1971 Quarter Final (second leg)	Real Madrid	2–0 (2–1 agg.)	Cardiff City	Madrid
	Manuel Velázquez 50'; Sebastián Fleitas 52'			Attendance: 10,000; Referee: Karol Sarka (Czechoslovakia)

=== Welsh Cup ===
2 February 1971 Round 3	Newport County	1–1	Cardiff City	Newport
	Jeff Thomas 3'		5' Brian Clark	Stadium: Somerton Park; Attendance: 6,162

10 February 1971 Round 3 (Replay)	Cardiff City	4–0	Newport County	Cardiff
19:30	John Parsons; Ian Gibson; Don Murray; Peter King			Stadium: Ninian Park; Attendance: 10,350; Referee: Ken Sweet (Aberdare)

17 February 1971 Round 4	Cardiff City	5–0	Bangor City	Cardiff
19:30	Ian Gibson 8'; Brian Clark 25'; Nigel Rees 54'; John Parsons; Peter King 86'			Stadium: Ninian Park; Attendance: 5,019

31 March 1971 Semi Final	Cardiff City	0–0	Chester City	Cardiff
19:30				Stadium: Ninian Park; Attendance: 5,522; Referee: Tom Reynolds (Swansea)

19 April 1971 Semi Final (Replay)	Chester City	1–2	Cardiff City	Chester
19:15	Keith Webber 38'		50' Brian Clark; 55' Steve Derrett	Stadium: Sealand Road; Attendance: 7,352; Referee: Tom Reynolds (Swansea)

10 May 1971 Final (First leg)	Wrexham	0–1	Cardiff City	Wrexham
19:15		Wrexham report	5' Bobby Woodruff	Stadium: The Racecourse; Attendance: 14,101; Referee: Ron Jones (Deganwy)

12 May 1971 Final (Second leg)	Cardiff City	3–1 (4–1 agg.)	Wrexham	Cardiff
19:30	Ronnie Bird 34'; Ian Gibson 84', 89'	Wrexham report	69' Ray Smith	Stadium: Ninian Park; Attendance: 4,987; Referee: Ron Jones (Deganwy)

== See also ==
- Cardiff City F.C. seasons

== Bibliography ==
- Hayes, Dean (2006). The Who's Who of Cardiff City. Breedon Books. ISBN 1-85983-462-0.
- Rothmans Football Yearbook 1970–71. Queen Anne Press. 1970. ISBN 0-362-00071-9.
- Barry J Hugman, ed. (1984). Canon League Football Players' Records 1946–1984. Newnes Books. ISBN 0-600-37318-5.
- Crooks, John (1986). Cardiff City Chronology 1920-86. John Crooks. ISBN 0-9511984-0-8.*Crooks, John (1992). Cardiff City Football Club: Official History of the Bluebirds. Yore Publications. ISBN 0-9513321-8-X.
- Shepherd, Richard (2002). The Definitive Cardiff City F.C. Nottingham: SoccerData Publications. ISBN 1-899468-17-X.
- Risoli, Mario (2014). From Tashkent With Love. St David's Press. ISBN 978-1-90271-941-2.
- "Cardiff City match-day Programmes (from season 1970–71)". Cardiff City Programmes. Cardiff City Football Club.
- "Football Club History Database – Cardiff City". Archived from the original on 30 December 2008.
- Welsh Football Data Archive
