= Billy Kellock (footballer, born 1954) =

Scottish footballer (1954–2024)

Personal information
- Full name: William Kellock
- Date of birth: 7 February 1954
- Place of birth: Glasgow, Scotland
- Date of death: 20 March 2024 (aged 70)
- Place of death: Kettering, England
- Height: 5 ft 10 in (1.78 m)
- Position: Midfielder

Youth career
- 1970–1971: Aston Villa

Senior career*
Years	Team	Apps	(Gls)
1971–1973	Cardiff City	35	(2)
1973–1974	Norwich City	3	(0)
1974	Millwall	0	(0)
1974–1976	Chelmsford City		
1976–1979	Kettering Town		
1979–1982	Peterborough United	134	(43)
1982	Luton Town	7	(0)
1982–1983	Wolverhampton Wanderers	12	(3)
1983–1984	Southend United	53	(8)
1984–1985	Port Vale	11	(4)
1985–1986	Halifax Town	43	(17)
1987–19??	Kettering Town		
Total		298+	(77+)

International career
- Scotland schoolboys
- * Club domestic league appearances and goals

William Kellock (7 February 1954 – 20 March 2024) was a Scottish footballer who scored 77 goals in 298 league games in an 11-year career in the Football League in the 1970s and 1980s. He played for Aston Villa, Cardiff City, Norwich City, Millwall, Chelmsford City, Kettering Town, Peterborough United, Luton Town, Wolverhampton Wanderers, Southend United, Port Vale, and Halifax Town. He was twice named to the PFA Team of the Year and was promoted out of the Second Division with Wolves in 1982–83.

== Career ==
Kellock was a youth team player at Aston Villa, though went on to play for Cardiff City in the 1971 FA Youth Cup final defeat to Arsenal. He broke into the first-team during the 1971–72 and 1972–73 seasons, helping Jimmy Scoular's "Bluebirds" to 19th and 20th-place finishes in the Second Division. He turned professional in February 1972. He played in the 1973 final of the Welsh Cup as Cardiff defeated Bangor City 5–1 on aggregate, though he only played in the 1–0 away defeat at Farrar Road. He scored two goals in 35 league games at Ninian Park. He then played three First Division games for Norwich City in 1973–74 as John Bond's "Canaries" suffered relegation. He left Carrow Road to sign with Millwall. However, "Lions" manager Gordon Jago never handed Kellock his league debut, who left The Den and dropped out of the Football League and joined Chelmsford City in October 1974. In October 1975, he scored four goals in a 6–1 Southern League Cup win over Banbury United despite missing a penalty kick. He also scored a hat-trick in the semi-finals of the Essex Professional Cup, though he was not selected for the final. He scored 41 goals in 76 games for Chelmsford before being released in January 1976. At that point, he signed with Kettering Town. Manager Derek Dougan led the "Poppies" to third in the Southern League 1976–77, and then new boss Mick Jones led the club to sixth place in 1977–78. He helped them to reach the 1979 FA Trophy final, where they were beaten 2–0 by Stafford Rangers.

Kellock impressed at Rockingham Road and returned to the Football League with Peterborough United after he was signed for a nominal fee in August 1979. Peter Morris's "Posh" finished eighth in the Fourth Division in 1979–80, before posting a fifth-place finish in 1980–81 – they ended the campaign just one place and three points behind promoted Wimbledon. By this stage Kellock had been appointed as club captain. They finished fifth again in 1981–82, six points behind fourth placed Bournemouth. In both 1980–81 and 1981–82, Kellock was named on the PFA Team of the Year. He scored 43 goals in 134 league games at London Road. He left the club for a £30,000 fee after being vocal in criticism of what he perceived as the club's lack of ambition. He played seven league games for David Pleat's Luton Town, but quickly left Kenilworth Road to play for Graham Hawkins's Wolverhampton Wanderers in March 1983. Wolves were promoted out of the Second Division in second place in 1982–83.

Kellock was re-signed by Peter Morris, now manager at Southend United, who were relegated out of the Third Division in 1983–84. Kellock scored eight goals in 53 league games at Roots Hall. He joined John Rudge's Port Vale in December 1984. He had a "stunning impact" on his debut; scoring two goals in a 5–1 win over Exeter City at Vale Park on New Year's Day. He was a regular in the side, scoring four goals in 11 Fourth Division games in 1984–85, before he strained a hamstring in March. After refusing new terms, in June 1985, he signed for Halifax Town, who were managed his former boss Mick Jones. He went on to score 17 goals in 43 Fourth Division appearances for the "Shaymen" in 1985–86, finishing as the club's top-scorer. This tally included a hat-trick against Wrexham at The Shay on 14 March. He left the club and returned to Kettering Town in 1987.

== Style of play ==
Kellock was an all-round midfielder with excellent long-range shooting ability who was aggressive in the tackle.

== Post-retirement ==
After leaving the game, Kellock was head of sales and marketing at a Country club near Oakham. He later worked as a painter and decorator. He was diagnosed with laryngeal cancer and a GoFundMe page was set up to support him.

Kellock's death was announced on 20 March 2024. He was 70.

== Career statistics ==
Appearances and goals by club, season and competition
Club	Season	League			FA Cup		Other		Total	
Club	Season	Division	Apps	Goals	Apps	Goals	Apps	Goals	Apps	Goals
Cardiff City	1971–72	Second Division	6	0	3	1	0	0	9	1
Cardiff City	1972–73	Second Division	29	2	4	2	0	0	33	4
Cardiff City	Total		35	2	7	3	0	0	42	5
Norwich City	1973–74	First Division	3	0	0	0	1	1	4	1
Millwall	1974–75	Second Division	0	0	0	0	0	0	0	0
Peterborough United	1979–80	Fourth Division	45	19	1	1	6	3	52	23
Peterborough United	1980–81	Fourth Division	46	13	6	0	4	1	56	14
Peterborough United	1981–82	Fourth Division	43	11	3	0	6	1	52	12
Peterborough United	Total		134	43	10	1	16	5	160	49
Luton Town	1982–83	First Division	7	0	1	0	1	2	9	2
Wolverhampton Wanderers	1982–83	Second Division	9	3	0	0	0	0	9	3
Wolverhampton Wanderers	1983–84	First Division	3	0	0	0	0	0	3	0
Wolverhampton Wanderers	Total		12	3	0	0	0	0	12	3
Southend United	1983–84	Third Division	40	5	1	0	4	4	45	9
Southend United	1984–85	Fourth Division	13	3	2	0	3	0	18	3
Southend United	Total		53	8	3	0	7	4	63	12
Port Vale	1984–85	Fourth Division	11	4	0	0	2	0	13	4
Halifax Town	1985–86	Fourth Division	43	17	5	0	3	0	51	17
Career total			298	77	26	4	30	12	354	93

== Honours ==
Individual

- Football League Fourth Division PFA Team of the Year: 1980–81 & 1981–82

Cardiff City

- FA Youth Cup runner-up: 1971
- Welsh Cup: 1973

Kettering Town

- FA Trophy runner-up: 1979

Wolverhampton Wanderers

- Football League Second Division second-place promotion: 1982–83
