= 1975–76 Newport County A.F.C. season =

Welsh association football club season

Newport County
1975–76 season
- Manager: Dave Elliott (until February 1976); Jimmy Scoular (from February 1976)
- Stadium: Somerton Park
- Fourth Division: 22nd (re-elected)
- FA Cup: 1st round
- League Cup: 1st round
- Top goalscorer: League: Parsons (15); All: Parsons (16)
- Highest home attendance: 5,182 vs Swindon Town (FA Cup, 22 Nov 1975)
- Lowest home attendance: 1,092 vs Watford (31 Mar 1976)
- Average home league attendance: 2,083
Home colours	Away colours	Third colours

The 1975–76 season was Newport County's 14th consecutive season in the Football League Fourth Division since relegation at the end of the 1961–62 season and their 48th overall in the Football League.

== Season review ==
Newport continued to play in shirts with broad shoulder stripes from the end of the previous season (shown as third kit here) until late September 1975, when they switched to kits with three adidas stripes down the sleeves but no other branding. The broad shoulder stripe kit was also used on occasions throughout the rest of the season, including against Swindon in the FA Cup on 22 November 1975 and against Watford at home on 31 March 1976.

=== Results summary ===
Overall								Home						Away					
Pld	W	D	L	GF	GA	GAv	Pts	W	D	L	GF	GA	Pts	W	D	L	GF	GA	Pts
46	13	9	24	57	90	0.633	35	8	7	8	35	33	23	5	2	16	22	57	12

Source: rsssf.com

=== Results by round ===
Round	1	2	3	4	5	6	7	8	9	10	11	12	13	14	15	16	17	18	19	20	21	22	23	24	25	26	27	28	29	30	31	32	33	34	35	36	37	38	39	40	41	42	43	44	45	46
Ground	H	A	H	A	H	A	A	H	A	H	A	H	H	A	A	H	A	A	H	A	H	A	H	A	H	A	H	H	H	A	A	H	H	A	H	H	A	H	A	A	H	A	A	H	H	A
Result	W	W	D	L	W	L	D	W	W	W	L	D	D	D	W	W	L	L	W	L	D	L	L	W	W	L	D	L	L	L	L	L	W	L	L	L	L	L	L	W	D	L	L	D	L	L
Position	7	3	3	7	1	8	7	7	6	4	6	6	6	9	5	5	7	9	7	9	9	10	13	10	7	9	9	14	15	16	16	16	16	17	17	19	20	20	20	20	19	19	21	22	22	22

Updated to match(es) played on 3 May 1976. Source: statto.com
A = Away; H = Home; W = Win; D = Draw; L = Loss

== Fixtures and results ==
=== Fourth Division ===
Date	Opponents	Venue	Result	Scorers	Attendance
16 Aug 1975	Lincoln City	H	3–1	Jones 2, Woods	2,797
23 Aug 1975	Workington	A	2–1	Woods, Jones	1,425
30 Aug 1975	Scunthorpe United	H	0–0		2,735
6 Sep 1975	Rochdale	A	3–4	Woods 2, Jones	1,119
13 Sep 1975	Southport	H	2–0	Godfrey, White	2,342
20 Sep 1975	Bournemouth	A	0–2		3,993
23 Sep 1975	Swansea City	A	2–2	S.Aizlewood 2	4,456
27 Sep 1975	Cambridge United	H	2–0	Parsons 2	2,244
4 Oct 1975	Brentford	A	3–1	Jones, Bell, Hooper	5,680
11 Oct 1975	Barnsley	H	1–0	Woods	3,043
18 Oct 1975	Huddersfield Town	A	1–2	Parsons	5,477
20 Oct 1975	Reading	H	0–0		3,955
25 Oct 1975	Exeter City	H	3–3	Parsons 2, Jones	2,871
1 Nov 1975	Torquay United	A	1–1	Parsons	2,163
3 Nov 1975	Stockport County	A	1–0	OG	2,208
8 Nov 1975	Bradford City	H	3–1	Hooper, Love, White	2,747
15 Nov 1975	Doncaster Rovers	A	1–5	Parsons	7,793
29 Nov 1975	Hartlepool United	A	1–4	Godfrey	2,780
6 Dec 1975	Darlington	H	4–1	Jones, Parsons, White, OG	1,878
20 Dec 1975	Watford	A	1–3	Parsons	3,261
26 Dec 1975	Crewe Alexandra	H	2–2	Woodruff, Parsons	3,788
27 Dec 1975	Northampton Town	A	0–3		8,448
3 Jan 1976	Tranmere Rovers	H	1–5	Parsons	2,074
10 Jan 1976	Scunthorpe United	A	2–1	Woods 2	1,879
17 Jan 1976	Bournemouth	H	3–1	Parsons, White, OG	1,496
24 Jan 1976	Southport	A	0–3		1,268
7 Feb 1976	Stockport County	H	2–2	White, S.Aizlewood	1,652
21 Feb 1976	Doncaster Rovers	H	2–3	Parsons, Woods	1,543
23 Feb 1976	Swansea City	H	1–2	S.Aizlewood	2,040
28 Feb 1976	Exeter City	A	0–3		3,447
2 Mar 1976	Reading	A	0–1		6,211
5 Mar 1976	Torquay United	H	0–2		1,588
8 Mar 1976	Brentford	H	1–0	Parsons	1,150
13 Mar 1976	Barnsley	A	1–3	Woods	2,587
17 Mar 1976	Huddersfield Town	H	1–2	Parsons	1,374
20 Mar 1976	Hartlepool United	H	0–1		1,230
27 Mar 1976	Darlington	A	0–4		1,312
31 Mar 1976	Watford	H	0–2		1,092
3 Apr 1976	Lincoln City	A	1–4	M.Aizlewood	8,178
6 Apr 1976	Cambridge United	A	1–0	Love	1,361
10 Apr 1976	Rochdale	H	1–1	Jones	1,331
14 Apr 1976	Tranmere Rovers	A	1–3	Jones	2,629
17 Apr 1976	Crewe Alexandra	A	0–4		1,971
20 Apr 1976	Northampton Town	H	1–1	Jones	1,728
24 Apr 1976	Workington	H	2–3	Woods, Jones	1,226
3 May 1976	Bradford City	A	0–3		1,676

=== FA Cup ===
Round	Date	Opponents	Venue	Result	Scorers	Attendance
1	22 Nov 1975	Swindon Town	H	2–2	Godfrey, Parsons	5,182
1r	25 Nov 1975	Swindon Town	A	0–3		7,574

=== Football League Cup ===
Round	Date	Opponents	Venue	Result	Scorers	Attendance	Notes
1–1	19 Aug 1975	Exeter City	H	1–1	Love	2,268	
1–2	26 Aug 1975	Exeter City	A	0–2			1–3 agg

== League table ==
Pos	Team	Pld	W	D	L	GF	GA	GAv	Pts	Promotion
20	Darlington	46	14	10	22	48	57	0.842	38	
21	Stockport County	46	13	12	21	43	76	0.566	38	Re-elected
22	Newport County	46	13	9	24	57	90	0.633	35	Re-elected
23	Southport	46	8	10	28	41	77	0.532	26	Re-elected
24	Workington	46	7	7	32	30	87	0.345	21	Re-elected

=== Election ===
Votes	Club	Fate
42	Stockport County	Re-elected to the League
41	Newport County	Re-elected to the League
38	Southport	Re-elected to the League
21	Workington	Re-elected to the League
18	Yeovil Town	Not elected to the League
14	Kettering Town	Not elected to the League
6	Wigan Athletic	Not elected to the League
3	Chelmsford City	Not elected to the League
3	Wimbledon	Not elected to the League
2	Nuneaton Borough	Not elected to the League
2	Telford United	Not elected to the League
1	Gainsborough Trinity	Not elected to the League
1	Scarborough	Not elected to the League
