= Derrett =

Derrett may refer to:

- Steve Derrett, Welsh footballer
- J Duncan M Derrett, Professor of Oriental Laws in the University of London
- Tom Derrett, bassist of Morning Runner
