= List of people diagnosed with Lewy body dementia =

Famous people have been diagnosed with Lewy body dementia.

== Deceased ==
- Don Murray (18 January 1946 – 2 November 2026; aged 80), Scottish footballer.
- Patrick Stewart (13 July 1940 – 28 October 2026; aged 86), English actor.
- Mike Wallace (July 22, 1942 – July 5, 2026; aged 83), American historian and author.
- Robert Edward Turner III (November 19, 1938 – May 6, 2026; aged 87), American businessman, television producer, media proprietor, and philanthropist.
- Nathalie Baye (6 July 1948 – 17 April 2026; aged 77), French film, television and stage actress.
- Sam Kieth (January 11, 1963 – March 15, 2026; aged 63), American comics artist and writer.
- Jerry Sloan (March 28, 1942 – May 22, 2020; aged 78), American professional basketball player and former Member of NBA.
- Robin Williams (July 21, 1951 – August 11, 2014; aged 63), American actor.
