= Ken Jones (footballer, born 1944) =

English footballer (1944–2012)

Personal information
- Full name: Kenneth Jones
- Date of birth: 26 June 1944
- Place of birth: Havercroft, England
- Date of death: 27 December 2012 (aged 68)
- Place of death: Winchester, England
- Height: 5 ft 10 in (1.78 m)
- Position: Full-back

Youth career
- Monckton Colliery

Senior career*
Years	Team	Apps	(Gls)
1961–1965	Bradford Park Avenue	100	(3)
1965–1971	Southampton	79	(0)
1971–1972	Cardiff City	6	(0)
1973–1974	Bath City		
1974	Basingstoke Town		
- * Club domestic league appearances and goals

Kenneth Jones (26 June 1944 – 27 December 2012) was an English footballer. The grandson of Aaron Jones, Jones played for several clubs in The Football League during his career, including Bradford Park Avenue, Southampton, and Cardiff City. He played primarily as a full-back.

== Career ==
Originally from Yorkshire, Jones began his career as a forward for the team of Monckton Colliery, where he was an apprentice electrician at the time; he later converted to a full-back and, despite interest from Arsenal, Aston Villa, and Coventry City, joined Bradford Park Avenue in September 1961 at the age of 16. Making over 100 appearances for the team as a teenager, Jones was dubbed by then-manager Jimmy Scoular as "the best full-back in the Fourth Division".

Jones's performances at Bradford Park Avenue attracted the attention of Southampton manager Ted Bates, who brought him to the club in June 1965, paying £15,000 for the defender. He made his debut for the club in September against Coventry City, but despite being able to play on either the left or the right of defence he struggled to cement a place in the team due to the competition provided by Stuart Williams, Tommy Hare, and David Webb. He made seven appearances at right-back in the 1965–66 season, which saw the Saints promoted to the First Division.

In his first season in the top flight, Jones made a total of 19 appearances, most of which were at left-back. In his remaining seasons at Southampton, Jones continued to struggle with securing a place in the regular starting line-up, as Joe Kirkup and Bob McCarthy added more competition to his regular positions, and at the end of the 1970–71 season he left the club after Bates failed to inform him about interest from other clubs.

After leaving the Saints, Jones rejoined old manager Scoular at Cardiff City for £6,000, but a string of injuries meant he only made a handful of appearances, after which he was released by the club. The final, non-league clubs he played for were Bath City and Basingstoke Town, and he briefly worked as a coach at Olivers Battery.
