= Frank Parsons =

Frank Parsons may refer to:

- Frank Parsons (Australian soccer), retired Australian footballer
- Frank Parsons (English footballer) (born 1947), retired English footballer (Crystal Palace and Cardiff City)
- Frank Parsons (social reformer) (1854–1908), lawyer, professor, and public intellectual; regarded as father of vocational guidance movement
- Frank Parsons Jr. (1906–1957), American sports shooter
- Frank Alvah Parsons, president of the New York School of Art
- Frank Nesmith Parsons (1854–1934), lawyer, politician, and Chief Justice of the New Hampshire Supreme Court

== See also ==
- Francis Parsons (disambiguation)
