= Francis Parsons =

Francis or Frances Parsons may refer to:

- Francis Parsons (painter) (died 1804), British painter
- Francis Newton Parsons (1875–1900), British soldier and recipient of the Victoria Cross
- Frances Griscom Parsons (1850–1925), American reformer and educator
- Frances Theodora Parsons (1861–1952), American botanist

== See also ==
- Frank Parsons (disambiguation)
