= Tony Villars =

Welsh footballer (1952–2020)

Personal information
- Full name: Anthony Keith Villars
- Date of birth: 24 January 1952
- Place of birth: Pontypool, Wales
- Date of death: 9 September 2020 (aged 68)
- Position: Winger

Senior career*
Years	Team	Apps	(Gls)
1971–1976	Cardiff City	73	(4)
1976–1977	Newport County	29	(1)

International career
1974	Wales	3	(0)
- * Club domestic league appearances and goals

Anthony Keith Villars (24 January 1952 – 9 September 2020) was a Welsh international footballer.

== Career ==
Born in Pontypool, Villars was a member of the youth set-up and groundstaff at Newport County but quit the job because the pay was so poor. Moving into the Welsh league he signed for Pontnewydd. His time at the club was short after the entire team was signed by Panteg after a number of impressive performances. Working as an apprentice electrician, it was here that he was spotted by Cardiff City who offered him a professional contract in the summer of 1971. Villars soon established himself in the first team, making his debut in a 4–3 defeat to Fulham in November 1971 with an impressive performance that led teammate Ian Gibson to comment Tony's got the lot, speed, balance and control. He's going to be some player.".

Often an inconsistent player, Villars also scored several crucial goals for the club, including one against Crystal Palace during a 1–1 draw to keep Cardiff in Division Two in April 1974. It was during his time at Cardiff that Villars earned all of his three caps for Wales, playing in three matches during the 1974 British Home Championship against England, Scotland and Northern Ireland. His debut in the opening match against England led Villars to become the 500th player to play for Wales. Persistent injury problems meant that he lost his place in the side and he moved to Newport County in June 1976, reuniting with his former Cardiff manager Jimmy Scoular.

He failed to reproduce the form he showed in his days at Cardiff and just under two years into his spell at the club his contract was cancelled. Incredibly just two and a half years after winning his three caps for Wales, Villars left league football never to return at the age of just 25. He later turned out for Welsh Football League side Blaenavon Blues before retiring.

== After football ==
Following his retirement, Villars worked as a milkman for 17 years. He later worked as a delivery driver for DHL Express. He died in September 2020.
