= Freddie Pethard =

Scottish footballer

Personal information
- Full name: Frederick James Pethard
- Date of birth: 7 October 1950 (age 76)
- Place of birth: Glasgow, Scotland
- Position: Defender

Senior career*
Years	Team	Apps	(Gls)
?–1969	Celtic	0	(0)
1969–1979	Cardiff City	177	(0)
1979–1982	Torquay United	105	(0)
Total		282	(0)
- * Club domestic league appearances and goals

Frederick James Pethard (born 7 October 1950) is a Scottish former professional footballer. He was born in Glasgow.

Pethard began his career at Celtic but failed to make an impact on the first team and was released by the club. He signed for Cardiff City initially as understudy to the full back pairing of David Carver and Gary Bell but he eventually managed to break into the side and hold his place for several years, despite suffering a number of minor injuries. He left in 1979 and signed for Torquay United where he spent three years before leaving league football. After leaving football, Fred joined Devon Probation Service and subsequently became the manager of the Torbay Youth Offending Team.
