= Brian Thompson (footballer, born 1950) =

English footballer (born 1950)

Personal information
- Full name: Brian Thompson
- Date of birth: 9 February 1950 (age 76)
- Place of birth: Kingswinford, England
- Position: Midfielder

Youth career
- –1967: Wolverhampton Wanderers

Senior career*
Years	Team	Apps	(Gls)
1967–1969	Wolverhampton Wanderers	0	(0)
1969–1973	Oxford United	57	(4)
1973	→ Torquay United (loan)	9	(1)
- Chelmsford City
Total		66	(5)
- * Club domestic league appearances and goals

Brian Thompson (born 9 February 1950) is an English former professional footballer who played as a midfielder in the Football League for Oxford United and Torquay United, in non-League football for Chelmsford City, and was on the books of Wolverhampton Wanderers without making a league appearance.
