= Mel Sutton =

English footballer and manager

Personal information
- Full name: Melvyn Charles Sutton
- Date of birth: 13 February 1946 (age 80)
- Place of birth: Birmingham, England
- Position: Midfielder

Senior career*
Years	Team	Apps	(Gls)
1967–1972	Cardiff City	138	(5)
1972–1982	Wrexham	360	(21)
1982–1983	Crewe Alexandra	13	(1)

Managerial career
- 1981–1982: Wrexham
- * Club domestic league appearances and goals

Melvyn Charles Sutton (born 13 February 1946) is an English former professional footballer.

== Career ==
Born in Birmingham, Sutton was an amateur at Aston Villa F.C. when Jimmy Scoular brought him to Cardiff City F.C. in December 1967. He made hus debut in August of the 1968–69 season during a 1–0 defeat against Charlton Athletic F.C. He missed very few matches over the following years at Ninian Park. He left Cardiff in 1972 to join Wrexham A.F.C. for £15,000, a record fee for the club at the time.

He made his debut for Wrexham against Southend United F.C., where he scored the only goal of the game. He became one of the club's all-time greats during a spell of nine years. He took over the role of assistant manager to Arfon Griffiths while still playing for the side and, following Grifiiths departure, he took over as manager. The side was relegated and he was sacked on 14 May 1982. He joined up with Griffiths again shortly thereafter, this time at Crewe Alexandra F.C. where he retired after a short time with the club.
