= Paul Went =

English footballer (1949–2017)

Personal information
- Full name: Paul Frank Went
- Date of birth: 12 October 1949
- Place of birth: Bow, England
- Date of death: 4 January 2017 (aged 67)
- Place of death: Chelmsford, England
- Position: Centre-half

Youth career
- 1964–66: Leyton Orient

Senior career*
Years	Team	Apps	(Gls)
1966–1967	Leyton Orient	50	(5)
1967–1972	Charlton Athletic	163	(15)
1972–1973	Fulham	58	(3)
1973–1976	Portsmouth	92	(5)
1976–1978	Cardiff City	72	(11)
1978–1980	Orient	45	(3)
Total		480	(42)

International career
1967–1968	England U18	10	(0)

Managerial career
- 1981: Orient
- * Club domestic league appearances and goals

Paul Frank Went (12 October 1949 – 4 January 2017) was an English footballer who played professionally for five clubs over a fifteen-year period. He was one of that generation who bridged the gap between terminological eras, beginning his career as a centre-half and ending it as a central defender despite playing a similar role throughout.

== Career ==
Born in Bromley-by-Bow on 12 October 1949 he played for both England schoolboys and the Under 18 youth side. After an apprenticeship he broke into the Orient first team in 1966, becoming the club's youngest ever player, and played 50 games for the club before being transferred to Charlton in June 1967.

He spent five years at The Valley before moving to Fulham in the summer of 1972. After only 18 months he was off to Portsmouth, part of new chairman John Deacon's ambitious new rebuilding programme. Manager John Mortimore planned a rock-like central partnership between Went and Malcolm Manley, but the former Leicester defender injured his knee in only his 11th game for the Fratton Park club and never played professionally again. Went, by contrast, was voted "Player of the Year" at the end of his first season.

As financial crisis piled on crisis manager Ian St John cut the wage bill by selling Went to Cardiff City, his last game being a 4–1 away defeat to Shrewsbury. Went's departure opened the door for future England defender Steve Foster, who was switched by St John from attack to defence. Went became a crowd favourite at Ninian Park, replacing Mike England in the Bluebirds' defence. A committed defender, he continued in the relegation decider against Carlisle United, despite a dislocated shoulder. The following season he played as a striker for the cash-strapped Bluebirds at times and netted a consolation goal against Tottenham at White Hart Lane in 1977. After two eventful years in Wales, Went returned to his home town to rejoin his first club. As his playing career drew to an end, Went was appointed assistant manager at Brisbane Road, culminating in a 21-day reign as full manager.

== Death ==
Portsmouth F.C.'s newsletter, 'Pompey News', for 5 December 2017, reported that he had died from a stroke.
