= Gary Bell (footballer) =

English footballer

Personal information
- Date of birth: 4 April 1947 (age 79)
- Place of birth: Stourbridge, England
- Position: Defender

Youth career
- Halesowen Town
- West Bromwich Albion

Senior career*
Years	Team	Apps	(Gls)
?–1966	Lower Gornal Athletic		
1966–1974	Cardiff City	223	(10)
1974	→ Hereford United (loan)	8	(0)
1974–1978	Newport County	126	(5)
1978–1979	Gloucester City	52	(2)
1979–?	Bridgend Town		
- * Club domestic league appearances and goals

Gary Bell (born 4 April 1947) is an English former professional footballer. During his career, he made over 350 appearances in The Football League most notably with Cardiff City where he spent eight years, helping the side to seven Welsh Cup victories. He later played for Hereford United, Newport County and Gloucester City.

== Career ==
=== Early career ===
Born in Stourbridge, Bell supported West Bromwich Albion as a child and spent time on trial with the club at the age of 15, having previously played reserve team football for Halesowen Town as a left winger in the Worcestershire Combination League. West Brom manager Jimmy Hagan offered Bell an amateur deal at The Hawthorns but he never played a senior match for the club. Bell took a job working at Halesowen steelworks during his time with the Baggies. Bell was offered a contract by non-league side Lower Gornal Athletic when their manager, Fred Whittle, visited Bell's home. Despite his father recommending that he stay with West Bromwich as an amateur, Bell accepted the contract, earning six pound a week plus a two-pound win bonus.

=== Cardiff City ===
Whilst playing for Lower Gornal, Bell was spotted by Cardiff City and signed professional terms with the club, along with George Andrews for a combined transfer fee of £2,100, a record amount that still stands for Gornal Athletic. He made his debut in September 1966 as a left half against Wolverhampton Wanderers. His debut was far from impressive as he gave away two penalties during a 7–1 defeat by the Midlands side. He struggled to make an impact on the side until he was converted to a left-back by manager Jimmy Scoular and he established a strong full back pairing with David Carver. He was a virtual ever present from then on and was part of the Cardiff side that defeated Real Madrid 1–0 at Ninian Park in the 1970–71 European Cup Winners' Cup. During the game, Bell was tasked with marking Spanish international winger Amancio Amaro and swapped shirts with Pirri after the match. He was eventually displaced from the side by Freddie Pethard. He was loaned out to Hereford United during his last season at Cardiff and was allowed to join Newport County following his return who were managed by his former teammate Brian Harris.

=== Later career ===
He was a vital part of Newport's team during his spell at the club before he moved to Gloucester City in 1978. He spent nearly two years with the Tigers, being appointed club captain for the 1978–79 season. Bell later moved into Welsh league football with Bridgend Town. Following his retirement, Bell worked as a mental health rehabilitation worker and later worked alongside other former Cardiff players, such as Roger Gibbins and Brian Clark, in the club's hospitality lounges on matchdays. He is still employed by the club in this role.

== Honours ==
Cardiff City

- Welsh Cup winner (7): 1966–67, 1967–68, 1968–69, 1969–70, 1970–71, 1972–73, 1973–74
- Welsh Cup runner-up: 1971–72
