= Roger Hoy =

English footballer

Personal information
- Full name: Roger Ernest Hoy
- Date of birth: 6 December 1946
- Place of birth: Poplar, Greater London, England
- Date of death: 9 November 2018 (aged 71)
- Height: 5 ft 10 1/2 in (1.79 m)
- Position: Defender

Youth career
- 1964–1965: Tottenham Hotspur

Senior career*
Years	Team	Apps	(Gls)
1965–1968	Tottenham Hotspur	10	(0)
1968–1970	Crystal Palace	54	(6)
1970–1971	Luton Town	32	(0)
1971–1973	Cardiff City	16	(0)
1973–????	Dagenham		
Total		112	(6)
- * Club domestic league appearances and goals

Roger Ernest Hoy (6 December 1946 – 9 November 2018) was an English professional footballer. Playing primarily as a defender, he made a total of 112 appearances in the Football League for Tottenham Hotspur, Crystal Palace, Luton Town and Cardiff City before moving into non-league football with Dagenham.

== Playing career ==
=== Early career ===
Hoy was born in Poplar, Greater London and his talent for football was spotted whilst playing for school teams. Hoy began his youth career at Tottenham Hotspur in 1964 in the full back position. He signed a professional contract with Spurs in May and at the same time switched to the centre-half position. Hoy made his league debut against Sunderland in March 1966 and went on to make 15 senior appearances for the club, usually as a stand-in for Wales international Mike England, before leaving in 1968.

=== Crystal Palace ===
On 26 September 1968, he signed for Crystal Palace and made 26 appearances (3 goals) that season, in which Palace reached the top tier in English football for the first time. Hoy began the 1969–70 season, in the top flight, as a first choice but lost his starting place to David Payne in October. However he continued to fulfil a number of roles for Palace for the rest of that season (wearing five differently numbered shirts) and finished with 28 appearances, scoring three times. He scored the winning goal in the final game of the season, against Manchester City, that saved the club from relegation. Hoy also scored a key goal by a header that was described as a "bullet" in an FA Cup game against Chelsea.

=== Later career ===
In June 1970, Hoy signed for Luton Town making 32 appearances in the 1970–71 season but without scoring. In 1971, he moved on to Cardiff City where he made 16 appearances over the next two seasons, again without scoring. In 1973, Hoy moved into non-league football with Bath City F.C. and Dagenham (later Dagenham and Redbridge), where he finished his career.

== Personal life ==
Hoy emigrated to New South Wales, Australia, with his family, where he took up a role with the clergy and played football for a Palm Beach team. Hoy suffered from Lewy body dementia, and died at the age of 71 on 9 November 2018.

== Honours ==
Tottenham Hotspur

- FA Cup: 1966–67

Cardiff City

- Welsh Cup: 1972–73
