= Bill Gates (footballer) =

English footballer (1944–2023)

Personal information
- Full name: William Lazenby Gates
- Date of birth: 8 May 1944
- Place of birth: Ferryhill, England
- Date of death: 21 October 2023 (aged 79)
- Position: Central defender

Youth career
- Middlesbrough

Senior career*
Years	Team	Apps	(Gls)
1961–1974	Middlesbrough	283	(12)
1974–1975	Spennymoor United		
Total		283+	(12+)
- * Club domestic league appearances and goals

William Lazenby Gates (8 May 1944 – 21 October 2023) was an English professional footballer who played as a central defender.

== Career ==
Born in Ferryhill, Gates played for Middlesbrough. He later played for Spennymoor United. He retired aged 30 after suffering from migraines, and later qualified as an accountant before opening a series of sports shops. He inspired a charity campaign related to footballers with dementia after heading footballs, for which his wife, Dr Judith Gates, launched the "Head for Change" and "Head Safe Football" charities. A documentary about Gates called The Billion Pound Game was released shortly after his death.
