= John Flynn (footballer, born 1948) =

English footballer

Personal information
- Full name: John Edward Flynn
- Date of birth: 20 March 1948 (age 78)
- Place of birth: Workington, England
- Height: 6 ft 0 in (1.83 m)
- Position: Defender

Youth career
- West Coronation Boys' Club
- Workington

Senior career*
Years	Team	Apps	(Gls)
1967–1969	Workington		
1969–1978	Sheffield United	190	(8)
1978–1980	Rotherham United		
1980–1982	Spalding United		
- * Club domestic league appearances and goals

John Edward Flynn (born 20 March 1948) is an English former footballer who played as a defender. Born in Workington, Cumbria he played in the Football League for Workington, Sheffield United and Rotherham United, spending the majority of his career in Sheffield where he made over 230 appearances for United.

== Playing career ==
Flynn began his senior career with his home town club of Workington, with whom he made his league debut as a 17-year-old amateur in December 1966. Having made occasional first-team appearances for the following eighteen months, Flynn was released in the summer of 1968. Flynn had intended to move to South Africa but a car accident delayed the move and Workington, having changed their manager, offered Flynn a new contract, prompting him to stay in England.

Flynn was spotted playing in Workington's reserves by Sheffield United's then general-manager John Harris and the club duly signed him for £5,000 in July 1969. Initially used as cover for Dave Powell he gradually began to make more appearances as Powell suffered from injury problems. By April 1971 Flynn had cemented his position as first-choice in central defence, partnering Eddie Colquhoun. Flynn remained a mainstay of United's defence until 1978 when he was given a free transfer to nearby Rotherham United. Having spent two seasons with Rotherham, Flynn moved to non-league Spalding United in 1980 where played for another two years until retiring in 1982.

== Post-football career ==
After retiring from playing, Flynn worked for the National Probation Service.
