= Bill Irwin (footballer) =

Northern Irish footballer (born 1951)

Personal information
- Full name: William Irwin
- Date of birth: 23 July 1951 (age 75)
- Place of birth: Newtownards, Northern Ireland
- Height: 6 ft 3 in (1.91 m)
- Position: Goalkeeper

Senior career*
Years	Team	Apps	(Gls)
1967–1971	Bangor	?	(?)
1971–1978	Cardiff City	180	(0)
1978–1980	Washington Diplomats	73	(0)
1981	Dallas Tornado	28	(0)
1982	Portland Timbers	25	(0)
1982–1983	Golden Bay Earthquakes (indoor)	27	(0)
1983–1984	Golden Bay Earthquakes	50	(0)
1984–1985	Crusaders	5	(0)
1985–1986	Minnesota Strikers (indoor)	14	(0)
1986–1987	Wichita Wings (indoor)		

International career
1971	Northern Ireland Amateur	2	(0)

Managerial career
- 1987–2003: University of Portland (assistant)
- 2003–15: University of Portland
- 2007–: US women's U23
- * Club domestic league appearances and goals

William Irwin (born 23 July 1951) is a Northern Irish former professional footballer, currently working as director of soccer at the University of Portland and head coach of the United States women's under-23 side.

== Personal life ==
Irwin and his wife, Liz, live in Portland with their two sons Bryan, who played for the Portland university team, and Nicholas.

== Playing career ==
An Irish amateur international, Irwin began his career at Bangor where he was managed by Charlie Tully. During his spell at the club, he helped win the clubs first honours when they won the County Antrim Shield and the City Cup in successive seasons. Prior to his death Tully had recommended Irwin to his former club Celtic but the move never materialised and he eventually joined Welsh side Cardiff City in 1971.

Brought in to replace Frank Parsons, Irwin was thrown straight into the Cardiff side and performed admirably, including winning the 1971–1972 BBC save of the season award for a spectacular save during a 2–0 defeat in the FA Cup against Leeds United in February 1972. He also became the first Cardiff goalkeeper to be sent off during a match after receiving his marching orders against Bangor City during the 1972–73 Welsh Cup final. Irwin held the position of first choice goalkeeper for four seasons, beating off competition from Parsons and Jim Eadie, until the arrival of Ron Healey in 1974 saw him lose his place. He eventually left the club in 1978 and went to play for the Washington Diplomats in the NASL.

He went on to play at various teams in the NASL before finishing his career with two years playing indoor football in the Major Indoor Soccer League. In December 1984 he joined Irish League side Crusaders until the end of January 1985.

== Coaching career ==
After his retirement Irwin took up an assistant manager role at the University of Portland alongside former Cardiff teammate Clive Charles. During his time at the university he has an impressive record of training goalkeepers. The five starting goalkeepers who have trained under Irwin, Greg Maas, Kasey Keller, Stuart Dobson, Scott Hileman, Curtis Spiteri and most recently Luis Robles, have all gone on to play professional football. Following the sudden death of Charles in 2003 Irwin was promoted to head coach after serving as his assistant for sixteen years.

Irwin has been involved with goalkeeper coaching throughout the US women's teams and various youth levels of the men's team and in 2007 he was appointed as head coach of the US under-23 women's team, winning the Nordic Cup in his first year.

== Honours ==
=== Player ===
Bangor

- City Cup Winner: 1

1970–71

- County Antrim Shield Winner: 1

1969–70

Cardiff City

- Welsh Cup Winner: 3

1972–73, 1973–74, 1975–76

- Welsh Cup Finalist: 2

1971–72, 1974–75

- Division Three Runner-up: 1

1975–76

=== Manager ===
United States women's under-23

- Nordic Cup Winner: 1

2007
