= Bob McCarthy (footballer) =

English footballer

Personal information
- Full name: Robert Zepp McCarthy
- Date of birth: 2 November 1948 (age 78)
- Place of birth: Lyndhurst, England
- Height: 5 ft 10 in (1.78 m)
- Position: Right-back

Youth career
- Abbotswood School
- Testwood Schools
- Southampton Schools
- 1963–1965: Southampton

Senior career*
Years	Team	Apps	(Gls)
1965–1975	Southampton	112	(2)
1975–1976	Poole Town		
1976–1977	Cowes Sports		
1977–1978	Andover		
- * Club domestic league appearances and goals

Robert Zepp McCarthy (born 21 November 1948) is an English retired footballer. Originally from Lyndhurst, Hampshire, McCarthy played the majority of his professional career with Football League club Southampton, before finishing his short career with brief spells at Poole Town, Cowes Sports, and Andover. McCarthy played primarily as a right-back.

== Playing career ==
Originally from the New Forest area, McCarthy grew up a fan of Southampton and is said to have wanted to join the club since he was a youngster. After playing his youth football with a number of local schools, McCarthy joined the Saints in October 1963 and signed his first professional deal with the club in November 1965; he did not make his senior debut until two years later, against Sunderland on 25 November 1967.

With Joe Kirkup the first choice at right-back, McCarthy struggled to break into the first team until the 1971–72 season, when he began to establish himself in the position and became the first choice. After Southampton's relegation to the Second Division in 1974, McCarthy struggled to regain his top form due to an operation on his knee, and after making only 16 league appearances in the 1974–75 season he decided to retire from the professional game at age 26. McCarthy spent a few seasons playing for local non-league clubs Poole Town, Cowes Sports, and Andover before retiring from football entirely.

In total, McCarthy made nearly 300 appearances for the Southampton senior and reserve teams combined, with club legend Terry Paine naming him in his choice for the Saints 'dream team' of his era.

== Career statistics ==
Season	Club	Division	League		FA Cup		League Cup		Other		Total	
Season	Club	Division	Apps	Goals	Apps	Goals	Apps	Goals	Apps	Goals	Apps	Goals
1967–68	Southampton	First Division	2	0	0	0	0	0	—		2	0
1968–69	Southampton	First Division	1	0	0	0	1	0	—		2	0
1969–70	Southampton	First Division	3	0	0	0	0	0	0	0	3	0
1970–71	Southampton	First Division	0	0	0	0	0	0	—		0	0
1971–72	Southampton	First Division	19	1	2	0	0	0	0	0	21	1
1972–73	Southampton	First Division	31	1	1	0	4	0	—		36	1
1973–74	Southampton	First Division	40	0	4	0	3	0	—		47	0
1974–75	Southampton	Second Division	16	0	0	0	3	0	7	0	26	0
Southampton total			112	2	7	0	11	0	7	0	137	2
