= Jim Eadie (footballer) =

Scottish footballer

Personal information
- Full name: James Eadie
- Date of birth: 4 February 1947 (age 79)
- Place of birth: Alexandria, Scotland
- Position: Goalkeeper

Youth career
- 1965: Balloch Juveniles

Senior career*
Years	Team	Apps	(Gls)
1965–1967	Rangers	0	(0)
1967–1968	Dumbarton	5	(0)
1968–1969	Kirkintilloch Rob Roy	?	(?)
1969–1973	Cardiff City	43	(0)
1972	→ Chester (loan)	6	(0)
1973–1977	Bristol Rovers	183	(0)
- * Club domestic league appearances and goals

James Eadie (born 4 February 1947) is a Scottish former professional footballer. During his career, he made over 200 appearances in the Football League in spells with Cardiff City, Chester and Bristol Rovers.

== Career ==
Eadie began his career at Rangers but never made a first team appearance for the club, moving to Dumbarton where he played a handful of matches before joining Kirkintilloch Rob Roy. It wasn't until he moved south to play in The Football League that he began to play regular football. He signed for Cardiff City in 1969, although he did not make his debut until the following year when he kept a clean sheet in a 2–0 win over Portsmouth in March 1970. The following season, he managed to oust Frank Parsons as the number one goalkeeper as Cardiff just missed out on promotion.

However, during the next season Eadie himself was ousted as first choice goalkeeper by Bill Irwin. After remaining as back-up for a short time, he spent time on loan at Chester before joining Bristol Rovers. He kept clean sheets in his first five matches at the club and was instrumental in the club winning promotion the following year. Eadie went on to appear over 200 times, earning the nickname "the flying pig" from the club's fans, before moving into non-league football to finish his career.

== Later life ==
After retiring from football, Eadie became a plumber before retiring to live in Bristol.
