= Alan Foggon =

English footballer

Personal information
- Date of birth: 23 February 1950 (age 76)
- Place of birth: West Pelton, County Durham, England
- Height: 5 ft 9 in (1.75 m)
- Position: Forward

Senior career*
Years	Team	Apps	(Gls)
1967–1971	Newcastle United	61	(14)
1971–1973	Cardiff City	17	(1)
1972–1976	Middlesbrough	115	(45)
1976	Hartford Bicentennials	19	(4)
1976	Rochester Lancers	7	(0)
1976	Manchester United	3	(0)
1976–1977	Sunderland	8	(0)
1977–1978	Southend United	22	(0)
1977–1978	→ Hartlepool United (loan)	18	(2)
1978–1979	Consett	?	(?)
1979–1980	Whitley Bay	?	(?)
Total		270	(66)
- * Club domestic league appearances and goals

Alan Foggon (born 23 February 1950) is an English former professional footballer. His regular position was as a forward.

== Early life ==
Foggon was born in West Pelton, County Durham before moving to nearby Craghead where his father had taken up a job as a miner.

== Club career ==
While playing for his school, Foggon was spotted by Newcastle United who invited him to train twice a week with the club's youth side before signing as an apprentice in 1967 under manager Joe Harvey. Having graduated from the junior and reserve sides at the club, he made his first-team debut just days before his 18th birthday, in a 0–0 draw at Arsenal. A schoolboy sprint champion, Foggon's moment of glory came in the second leg of the 1969 Fairs Cup Final in Budapest when shortly after coming on as a substitute his shot was pushed onto the crossbar by the Ujpest 'keeper, but the United man followed up to lash the ball into the net and make it 3–2 on the night, 6–2 on aggregate.

He moved on to Cardiff City in August 1971 after falling out of favour following the signing of Malcolm Macdonald. However, after struggling to establish himself in the first-team and growing disillusioned with the standard of football in the reserve leagues at the club, began to feel homesick and was unfit. The club received an offer for Foggon from Middlesbrough and Cardiff manager Jimmy Scoular gave him the option of accepting the offer which Foggon did. The fee for the transfer was £10,000 and the deal also saw Johnny Vincent move to Cardiff. Foggon became a favourite of the Ayresome Park crowd and helped the Teessiders to promotion from Division Two in 1974.

After brief stints with Rochester Lancers and Hartford Bicentennials in the United States, Foggon moved to Manchester United in 1976. That proved to be something of a disaster though and after just three league outings at Old Trafford he switched to Sunderland.

Later moves took him to Southend United, Hartlepool United (loan), Consett. and Whitley Bay.

He finished his career as one of only a few players who have played for all three of the North East's big three clubs.

== Life after football ==
Remaining on South Tyneside, Foggon worked in the security business and the pub trade, in Spennymoor and South Shields.
