= Alan Couch =

Welsh footballer

Personal information
- Full name: Alan Couch
- Date of birth: 15 March 1953 (age 73)
- Place of birth: Neath, Wales
- Position: Midfielder

Senior career*
| Years | Team | Apps | (Gls) |
| 1970–1973 | Cardiff City | 11 | (0) |
| 1973–1974 | Barry Town | 7 | (0) |
- * Club domestic league appearances and goals

Alan Couch (born 15 March 1953) is a Welsh former professional footballer. He played in the Football League as a midfielder for Cardiff City.

== Career ==
Born in Neath, Couch began his career with Cardiff City, playing in the club's youth team when they reached the final of the FA Youth Cup in 1971. He made his first-team debut on 27 November 1971 in a 2–1 defeat to Carlisle United and kept his place for the following two league matches. However, he made no further appearances during the remainder of the 1971–72 season and, after struggling to break into the first-team the following season, he left to join Barry Town in 1973.
