= Nigel Rees (footballer) =

Welsh footballer

Personal information
- Full name: Nigel Richard Rees
- Date of birth: 11 July 1953 (age 73)
- Place of birth: Cardiff, Wales
- Position: Winger

Senior career*
Years	Team	Apps	(Gls)
1970–1972	Cardiff City	27	(4)
- * Club domestic league appearances and goals

Nigel Richard Rees (born 11 July 1953) is a Welsh former professional footballer.

== Playing career ==
Born in Bridgend, Rees represented Wales under 15 rugby side and was a youth football international. He began his career as a youth player at Cardiff City, where he was part of the team that reached the 1971 FA Youth Cup final before losing to Arsenal. He was handed his professional debut at the age of 17 in a 4–0 win over Sheffield Wednesday in 1970 and played in the club's win over Real Madrid, supplying the cross for Brian Clark's winning goal. The following season Rees was unable to maintain his form as the club struggled in Division Two and he was eventually released.

After leaving Cardiff, Rees joined Bridgend Town where he spent several years but, despite returning to Ninian Park for a trial under manager Jimmy Andrews, he never returned to The Football League.
