= John Parsons (footballer, born 1950) =

Welsh footballer

Personal information
- Full name: John Stuart Parsons
- Date of birth: 10 December 1950 (age 75)
- Place of birth: Cardiff, Wales
- Position: Forward

Senior career*
Years	Team	Apps	(Gls)
1968–1973	Cardiff City	15	(6)
1973–1975	Bournemouth	8	(1)
1975–1977	Newport County	60	(23)
- * Club domestic league appearances and goals

John Stuart Parsons (born 10 December 1950) is a Welsh former professional footballer.

== Career ==
Parsons was born in Cardiff, and began his career at his hometown club Cardiff City, turning professional in 1968. However, he had to wait until February 1971 to make his debut for the club when he scored twice in consecutive substitute appearances against Oxford United and Sunderland and was handed his first start soon after. Despite being a prolific scorer in the reserve team, Parsons never managed to hold down a regular place in the first team due to the wealth of striking talent in the likes of Brian Clark, John Toshack and Alan Warboys and, in February 1973, left to join Bournemouth. His time at Bournemouth was severely hampered by injuries and he had made just 8 league appearances when he returned to Wales to sign for Newport County in March 1975. His spell at Newport was his most successful spell in The Football League, spending two seasons as a regular in the side before moving into non-league football.
