= Keith Dyson =

English footballer

Personal information
- Date of birth: 10 February 1950 (age 76)
- Place of birth: Consett, England
- Position: Forward

Senior career*
Years	Team	Apps	(Gls)
1968–1971	Newcastle United	76	(22)
1971–1976	Blackpool	94	(30)
1976–1978	Lancaster City	?	(?)
1978	Cleveland Cobras	14	(7)
Total		184	(59)

International career
1970	England U23	1	(0)

Managerial career
- 1979–1982: Lancaster City
- * Club domestic league appearances and goals

Keith Dyson (born 10 February 1950) is an English former professional footballer. He played as a forward.

== Playing career ==
Dyson began his career with Newcastle United in 1968. In three years at St James' Park, he made 76 league appearances and scored 22 goals.

In October 1971, he joined Blackpool in a deal that took Tony Green to Tyneside for a then-club record fee. Dyson went on to score thirty goals in 94 appearances during his five-year Bloomfield Road career. He was advised to retire from the professional game as a result of a knee injury.

His final club was Lancaster City, though after playing his testimonial game, he went to America on holiday in the summer of 1978 and met up with friend Jackie Mudie. The former Blackpool great was coaching the Cleveland Cobras and convinced Dyson to play for the second half of the season with remarkable results.

== Coaching career ==
He returned to the UK and managed Lancaster City between 1979 and 1982.

== Life after football ==
Dyson set up his own financial consultancy business, which he sold to Newcastle Building Society in 2024.
