= John Hunting (referee) =

English football referee (1935–2024)

- Full name: John Hunting
- Born: 1935; Leicester, England
- Died: 2 December 2024 (aged 89); Leicester, England
- Other occupation: University lecturer School Teacher - Heathfield High School - PE and Maths.

Domestic
Years	League	Role
1968–1984	Football League	Referee

International
Years	League	Role
1973–1984	FIFA listed	Referee

John Hunting (1935 – 2 December 2024) was an English football referee who operated in the Football League and for FIFA. During his time on the List he was based in Leicester, where he worked as a university lecturer.

== Career ==
Hunting became a Football League referee at the age of only 32. Four years later he was senior linesman during the 1972 FA Cup Final and it took only one more year for him to reach the FIFA List. In the summer of 1974 he toured Belize and Central America, producing a report for the Football Association and the British Council on association football in the region. In 1975 he was appointed referee for the FA Youth Cup final and in May 1975 he went to referee for the National Football League in South Africa as well as giving lectures there.

He refereed regularly abroad, including two European Championships qualifying games - the Netherlands against Switzerland on 28 March 1979, and the USSR versus Portugal on 27 April 1983. He also took charge of the FIFA World Cup qualifying match for the 1982 tournament between Nigeria and Tunisia on 12 July 1980.

Domestically, he was appointed to Home International Championship matches, such as the meeting between Northern Ireland and Scotland at Windsor Park, Belfast, on 28 April 1982.

His most senior European club game was the European Cup quarter-final second leg between Baník Ostrava and Bayern Munich in 1981. However, it was only at the very end of his career in 1984 that he was awarded the FA Cup Final. This was his farewell match, which took place at Wembley as Everton beat Watford 2–0.

== Personal life ==
Outside football, Hunting was a freemason, one of five said to have refereed the FA Cup Final. He was also an ITF Silver Badge tennis, and kerby referee.

Preceded by Alf Grey	FA Cup Final Referee; 1984	Succeeded by Peter Willis
