= Tony Oliver (referee) =

English football referee

Anthony Philip Oliver (born 6 March 1931) is an English former association football referee, who was active in the Football League.

== Early life ==
Anthony Philip Oliver was born in Chelmsford on 6 March 1931, and was educated at the city's King Edward VI Grammar School.

== Career ==
Oliver began his career in Chelmsford, refereeing local matches. He was promoted to Class 2 in 1954 and Class 1 in 1956, after which he was placed on the Linesmen's list of the Football Combination. In a 1959 Essex Senior Cup match, Oliver accidentally scored a goal.

In 1962, after moving to Leigh-on-Sea in Essex, Oliver was promoted to the Supplementary Referees List of the Football Combination; a year later he was promoted to the Full list, and was also added to the Linesmen's List of the English Football League.

In 1968, Oliver was promoted to the Football League Referees List, after serving the previous five seasons as a Linesman. Between 1968 and 1974, he refereed every club except Sunderland. He was the referee for the first ever professional football match played on a Sunday in England when Cambridge United played Oldham Athletic in the FA Cup on 6 January 1974. Several other games were played that day but this was the first to kick off at 11.15 am.
