= Bobby Woodruff =

English footballer

Personal information
- Full name: Robert William Woodruff
- Date of birth: 9 November 1940 (age 85)
- Place of birth: Highworth, England
- Position: Midfielder

Youth career
- Swindon Town

Senior career*
Years	Team	Apps	(Gls)
1958–1964	Swindon Town	180	(20)
1964–1966	Wolves	63	(18)
1966–1969	Crystal Palace	125	(48)
1969–1974	Cardiff City	150	(22)
1974–1976	Newport County	52	(7)
- * Club domestic league appearances and goals

Robert William Woodruff (born 9 November 1940) is an English former professional footballer.

Born in Highworth, Wiltshire, Woodruff began his career at his hometown club Swindon Town where he broke into the first team at 18. He was a regular in the side before joining Wolves in 1964 for forty thousand pounds. During this time he gained a reputation as a long-throw specialist but eventually moved on two years later to Crystal Palace. He helped take Palace to division one but only played a handful of matches in the top flight before being allowed to leave and join Cardiff City for £25,000. He was signed as a replacement for Barrie Jones. He scored six goals in six games when asked to play as a centre forward. He was released in 1974 and joined neighbours Newport County. He later finished his career playing in Welsh League football.

After retiring, he took positions as both youth coach and reserve team coach at Cardiff, also later working as a social worker. Woodruff's son, Robert Woodruff, also played for Cardiff City, Swindon Town, Newport County and Cork City before having a successful career in Belgium. Robert scored the first league goal for Cork City FC in 1984.
