= Leighton Phillips =

Welsh footballer

Personal information
- Date of birth: 26 September 1949 (age 77)
- Place of birth: Neath, Wales
- Position: Defender

Senior career*
Years	Team	Apps	(Gls)
1967–1974	Cardiff City	180	(11)
1974–1978	Aston Villa	140	(4)
1978–1981	Swansea City	97	(0)
1981–1983	Charlton Athletic	45	(1)
1983	Exeter City	10	(0)

International career
1971–1975	Wales U23	5	(0)
1971–1981	Wales	58	(0)
- * Club domestic league appearances and goals

Leighton Phillips (born 26 September 1949) is a Welsh former professional footballer. During his career, he made over 450 appearances in The Football League during spells with Cardiff City, Aston Villa, Swansea City, Charlton Athletic and Exeter City and won 58 caps for Wales.

== Club career ==
A Welsh schoolboy international, Phillips began his career at Cardiff City, making his way through the youth and reserve sides before making his debut as a substitute during a 2–2 draw against Rotherham United in January 1968, scoring with his very first touch. In these early stages of his career, Phillips was used in positions all over the pitch, including playing as a striker and midfielder, before settling in defence as a sweeper, taking over the role following the departure of Brian Harris.

He became increasingly unhappy with the lack of success at the club and in September 1974 he left the club to join Aston Villa for a fee of £100,000. Winning the League Cup in 1977, Phillips also went on to captain the side on his way to making 175 appearances for the club before becoming Swansea City's record signing when he joined for £70,000 in November 1978. After winning promotion to Division One, Phillips moved to Charlton Athletic for £25,000 before finishing his league career with Exeter City.

== International career ==
Having won caps at under-21 and under-23 level, Phillips made his senior debut in a 3–1 defeat to Czechoslovakia on 21 April 1971.

== Honours ==
Cardiff City

- Welsh Cup: 1971, 1973, 1974

Aston Villa

- Football League Cup: 1976–77
