= Don Murray (footballer) =

Scottish footballer (1946–2026)

Personal information
- Full name: Donald James Murray
- Date of birth: 18 January 1946
- Place of birth: Duffus, Moray, Scotland
- Date of death: 2 November 2026 (aged 80)
- Place of death: Llandough, Penarth, Wales
- Position: Defender

Senior career*
Years	Team	Apps	(Gls)
1961-1962	Burghead Thistle		
1962-1975	Cardiff City	406	(6)
1974-1975	→ Swansea City (loan)	5	(0)
1975-1976	Heart of Midlothian	38	(0)
1976-1977	Newport County	18	(0)

International career
1965	Scotland U23	1	(0)
- * Club domestic league appearances and goals

Donald James Murray (18 January 1946 – 2 November 2026) was a Scottish professional footballer. A Scotland under-23 international, Murray spent the majority of his career playing for Cardiff City where he made over 400 appearances in all competitions during a thirteen-year spell. He also played for Swansea City, Heart of Midlothian, Newport County and Barry Town.

== Club career ==
Born in Duffus, Moray, to a farming family, Murray worked his way through Morayshire football playing for Hopeman School, Moray and Nairn Schools Select and then began playing for Morayshire Junior League team, Burghead Thistle at the age of 15 . At 16 Murray was bought after a 6 week trial and began his professional career at Cardiff City, making his debut at the age of 17 against Middlesbrough in May 1963. Fully establishing himself in the 1964–65 season he went on to hold a first team spot with the Bluebirds for a decade, including being an ever-present for three of the seasons, and currently holds the club record for consecutive league appearances with 146 games between May 1968 to November 1971. Murray was also a member of the Cardiff squad that reached the European Cup Winners Cup semi-final in the 1967–68 season. He was also a member of the side that beat Real Madrid in the quarter final first leg of the same competition three years later before going down 2–1 on aggregate. He played 33 games in that competition throughout his career.

Cardiff often received offers from higher clubs for Murray but he decided to remain with Cardiff for the majority of his career. He had a short loan spell at Swansea City in his last year with the club before returning to Scotland for a year with Heart of Midlothian for a fee of £15,000. He joined Newport County the following year, linking up with former Cardiff manager Jimmy Scoular. In July 1977, he joined Barry Town of the Southern League for one season.

== International career ==
Murray gained one Scotland under-23 cap.

== Death ==
Murray died from complications of Lewy body dementia in Llandough, Penarth, on 2 November 2026, aged 80.

== Honours ==
Cardiff City

- Welsh Cup (9): 1964, 1965, 1967, 1968, 1969, 1970, 1971, 1973, 1974; runner-up 1972
