= David Carver =

English footballer

Personal information
- Full name: David Francis Carver
- Date of birth: 16 April 1944 (age 82)
- Place of birth: Wickersley, England
- Position: Defender

Senior career*
Years	Team	Apps	(Gls)
1962–1966	Rotherham United	82	(0)
1966–1973	Cardiff City	210	(1)
1972	→ Swansea City (loan)	3	(0)
1973–1974	Hereford United	14	(0)
1974–1975	Doncaster Rovers	30	(0)
- * Club domestic league appearances and goals

David Francis Carver (born 16 April 1944) is an English former professional footballer. During his career, he made over 300 appearances in the Football League most notably for Cardiff City where he made over 200 appearances and was part of the side that won the Welsh Cup on four occasions between 1968 and 1971.

== Career ==
Carver began his career at his hometown club Rotherham United and after establishing himself in the squad he was signed by Jimmy Scoular, then manager of Cardiff City for a fee of £11,000 in January 1966. He made his debut in a 1–1 draw with Bury and eventually formed a strong full back partnership alongside Gary Bell. His only league goal for the club came on 17 October 1970 during a 2–2 draw with Leicester City. After spending six years at Cardiff he was loaned out for a short period at Swansea City before being allowed to leave and join Hereford United in 1973, where he spent one year before finishing his playing career at Doncaster Rovers.

== Honours ==
Cardiff City

- Welsh Cup winner: 1967–68, 1968–69, 1969–70, 1970–71
