= Fred Dewey (footballer) =

Welsh footballer

Personal information
- Full name: Frederick Dewey
- Date of birth: 11 October 1898
- Place of birth: Cardiff, Wales
- Date of death: 18 January 1980 (aged 81)
- Position: Forward

Senior career*
Years	Team	Apps	(Gls)
1930–1931	Cardiff Corinthians		

International career
1930	Wales	2	(0)
- * Club domestic league appearances and goals

Fred Dewey (11 October 1898 – 18 January 1980) was a Welsh international footballer. He was part of the Wales national football team, playing 2 matches. He played his first match on 25 October 1930 against Scotland and his last match on against England.

== See also ==
- List of Wales international footballers (alphabetical)
