= Ian Gibson (footballer, born 1943) =

Scottish footballer (1943–2016)

Personal information
- Full name: Ian Stewart Gibson
- Date of birth: 30 March 1943
- Place of birth: Newton Stewart, Scotland
- Date of death: 25 May 2016 (aged 73)
- Position: Midfielder

Senior career*
Years	Team	Apps	(Gls)
1958–1959	Accrington Stanley	9	(3)
1959–1962	Bradford Park Avenue	88	(18)
1962–1966	Middlesbrough	168	(44)
1966–1970	Coventry City	93	(13)
1970–1972	Cardiff City	90	(11)
1972–1974	Bournemouth	20	(0)
1974	Highlands Park		
1974–1975	Whitby Town	?	(1)
1975	Berea Park		

International career
1963–1964	Scotland U23	2	(0)
- * Club domestic league appearances and goals

Ian Stewart Gibson (30 March 1943 – 25 May 2016) was a Scottish professional footballer.

== Career ==
=== Early career ===
A Scottish schoolboy international, Gibson began his career at Accrington Stanley, making his league debut at the age of 15, before joining Bradford Park Avenue in 1960. He spent two years in Bradford.

=== Middlesbrough ===
Gibson's form in Bradford saw Middlesbrough pay £30,000 to sign him in March 1962. He joined the club as it was entering a steady decline which saw them fall into the third division.

=== Coventry City ===
With Middlesbrough relegated in 1966 Gibson was signed by Coventry City for £57,500 and despite a major fall-out with manager Jimmy Hill he helped them win promotion to the First division in his first season, becoming one of the fan's most popular players. Despite numerous injuries in his four years at Coventry, under Noel Cantwell he helped them qualify for Europe in 1969–70 by virtue of finishing sixth in the First Division. During his four years at Highfield Road he played alongside the likes of Willie Carr, Neil Martin, George Curtis and Ernie Hannigan. 'Gibbo' as he was nicknamed was an active member of the Coventry City Former Players Association and attended a couple of matches every season at Coventry until his death.

=== Cardiff City ===
Gibson was sold to Cardiff City in 1970 for £35,000. He made his Cardiff debut on the opening day of the 1970–71 season in a 1–0 win over Leicester City and went on to provide numerous chances for the strikers he played alongside such as Brian Clark, John Toshack and Alan Warboys. After helping the side avoid relegation in his second year he was sold.

=== Bournemouth ===
Gibson went to Bournemouth in October 1972 for £100,000 but after only a few months a serious injury saw his professional career ended.

== Honours ==
- Coventry City F.C. Hall of Fame
