= Steve Derrett =

Welsh footballer (born 1947)

Personal information
- Full name: Stephen Clifford Derrett
- Date of birth: 16 October 1947 (age 79)
- Place of birth: Cardiff, Wales
- Position: Defender

Senior career*
| Years | Team | Apps | (Gls) |
| 1967–1972 | Cardiff City | 66 | (0) |
| 1972–1973 | Carlisle United | 13 | (0) |
| 1973 | → Aldershot (loan) | 4 | (0) |
| 1973–1976 | Rotherham United | 81 | (2) |
| 1976–1978 | Newport County | 61 | (0) |

International career
| | Wales U23 | 3 | (0) |
| 1969–1971 | Wales | 4 | (0) |
- * Club domestic league appearances and goals

Stephen Clifford Derrett (born 16 October 1947) is a Welsh former professional footballer. During his career, he made over 200 appearances in the Football League and won four caps for Wales.

== Career ==
A youth team player at the club, Steve Derrett began his career at Cardiff City, making his first team debut in a European Cup Winners Cup match against NAC Breda in 1967. He went on to make his league debut in November of the same year in a match against Birmingham City and went on to establish himself in the side over the following years, including earning all of his four caps for Wales, two of which ended in heavy defeats against Scotland and Italy.

Derrett left Cardiff in 1972 to join Carlisle United but struggled to settle at Brunton Park and, after a short loan spell at Aldershot, moved on to Rotherham United the following year. He spent three years at Rotherham, making over 80 appearances, before returning to South Wales to sign for Newport County only for a knee injury two years into his spell there to end his professional career.

== Honours ==
Cardiff City

- Welsh Cup Winner: 1

1968–69
