= 1972–73 Welsh Cup =

Tournament details
- Country: Wales

Final positions
- Champions: (Wales) Cardiff City
- Runners-up: (Wales) Bangor City

The 1972–73 FAW Welsh Cup is the 86th season of the annual knockout tournament for competitive football teams in Wales.

== Key ==
League name pointed after clubs name.

- CCL - Cheshire County League
- FL D2 - Football League Second Division
- FL D3 - Football League Third Division
- FL D4 - Football League Fourth Division
- MWL - Mid-Wales Football League
- NPL - Northern Premier League
- SFL - Southern Football League
- WLN - Welsh League North
- WLS - Welsh League South

== Fourth round ==
Nine winners from the Third round and seven new clubs.

Tie no	Home	Score	Away
1	Chester (FL D4)	1–0	Wrexham (FL D3)

== Fifth round ==
Tie no	Home	Score	Away
1	Welshpool (MWL)	1–1	Chester (FL D4)
replay	Chester (FL D4)	1–0	Welshpool (MWL)

== Semifinal ==
Tie no	Home	Score	Away
1	Bangor City (NPL)	2–0	Hereford United (FL D4)
2	Chester (FL D4)	0–1	Cardiff City (FL D2)

== Final ==
Tie no	Home	Score	Away
1	Bangor City (NPL)	1–0	Cardiff City (FL D2)
1	Cardiff City (FL D2)	5–0	Bangor City (NPL)
