= Alan Warboys =

English footballer

Personal information
- Date of birth: 18 April 1949 (age 77)
- Place of birth: Goldthorpe, England
- Position: Striker

Senior career*
Years	Team	Apps	(Gls)
1966–1968	Doncaster Rovers	40	(12)
1968–1970	Sheffield Wednesday	79	(13)
1970–1972	Cardiff City	60	(27)
1972	Sheffield United	7	(0)
1972–1976	Bristol Rovers	144	(53)
1976–1977	Fulham	19	(2)
1977–1979	Hull City	49	(9)
1979–1982	Doncaster Rovers	89	(21)
Total		487	(137)
- * Club domestic league appearances and goals

Alan Warboys (born 18 April 1949) is an English former professional footballer who played as a striker.

== Career ==
Warboys began his career at Doncaster Rovers, making his debut in April 1967 at the age of 17, before moving to Sheffield Wednesday in 1968. Following Wednesday's relegation in 1970, he joined Cardiff City for a fee of £42,000, as a replacement for John Toshack who had joined Liverpool. On his home debut for the club, Warboys scored twice against the team he had just left, Sheffield Wednesday and went on to finish the season having scored 13 goals in 17 league games, including scoring four times in one match during a 4–0 win over Carlisle United, as the club missed out on promotion by one place. After spending one more year at Cardiff, he returned to Yorkshire to join Sheffield United as part of a swap deal which saw Gil Reece and Dave Powell move the other way to Ninian Park.

After a brief spell with Sheffield United, Warboys joined Bristol Rovers. In his five seasons at the club, he forged a lethal forward pairing with Bruce Bannister which would be much-celebrated, taking Rovers to promotion to the Second Division and earning the duo the nickname Smash and Grab in reference to Warboys' physical playing style and Bannisters ability to grab the resulting chances created by Warboys. He later played for Fulham and Hull City before returning to Doncaster Rovers. In his first season back at the club he was awarded the club's Player of the Year award before later moving into defence. Following an operation to remove a disc from his back, he retired in 1982.

== After football ==
After retiring from football, Warboys settled in Doncaster, working as a lorry driver. He was also the landlord of the Ring 'o' bells in Swinton, South Yorkshire during the 1990s.
