= Brian Clark (footballer, born 1943) =

English footballer

Personal information
- Full name: Brian Donald Clark
- Date of birth: 13 January 1943
- Place of birth: Bristol, England
- Date of death: 10 August 2010 (aged 67)
- Place of death: Cardiff, Wales
- Height: 5 ft 10 in (1.78 m)
- Position: Striker

Senior career*
Years	Team	Apps	(Gls)
1960–1967	Bristol City	195	(83)
1967–1968	Huddersfield Town	32	(11)
1968–1972	Cardiff City	182	(75)
1972–1973	AFC Bournemouth	30	(12)
1973–1975	Millwall	71	(17)
1975–1976	Cardiff City	21	(1)
1976–1979	Newport County	80	(18)
Total		611	(217)
- * Club domestic league appearances and goals

Brian Donald Clark (13 January 1943 – 10 August 2010) was an English professional footballer. He scored the only goal in a 1–0 victory for Cardiff City against Real Madrid in the first leg of the European Cup Winners Cup quarter-final in 1971. Clark made sports history in England on 20 January 1974 when he became the first player ever in The Football League to score a goal on a Sunday. Clark accomplished the feat for Millwall F.C. in its 1–0 win over Fulham

== Career ==
The son of former Bristol City player Don Clark, Clark captained Bristol Boys' before signing professional terms with Bristol City himself in March 1960, making his debut for the club in 1961 during a 3–0 victory over Brentford on the final day of the season. After featuring regularly for the Robins reserve side, it was during the 1962–63 season that he established himself in the side, finishing as the club's top scorer with 23 goals. He continued to score regularly for the side and helped the side gain promotion to Division Two during the 1964–65 season, forming a formidable attacking partnership with John Atyeo and Bobby Williams, again finishing as the club's top scorer with 24 goals. In October 1966 he left Bristol City to sign for Huddersfield Town in exchange for John Quigley.

Clark failed to settle at the Yorkshire club and, after two years, was snapped up by Cardiff City manager Jimmy Scoular for £8,000. Scoring twice on his debut during a 4–3 win over Derby County, he went on to form a lethal partnership with John Toshack, ending the season with 17 goals and his first Welsh Cup winners medal. Clark finished as the club's top scorer for the next two seasons, as well as scoring 5 times in a single match against Barmouth & Dyffryn, falling short of Derek Tapscott's club record of goals in a game by just one. It was during the 1970–71 season that he achieved probably the high point of his career when he headed in the only goal of the first leg against Real Madrid in a 1–0 win during the European Cup Winners Cup quarter-final. The following year he again finished as Cardiff's top scorer, the third successive year he had done so, before he and Ian Gibson were surprisingly sold to AFC Bournemouth for a combined fee of £100,000.

Clark spent one year at Bournemouth, followed by a spell at Millwall. He soon returned to Ninian Park to play for Cardiff again. His second spell at the club lasted just a single season but he still managed to help the club win promotion to Division Two. He left the club to sign for Newport County before finishing his career with a number of player-manager roles at several Welsh Football League sides.

== Death ==
Clark died on 10 August 2010 at the age of 67 from Lewy body dementia at Whitchurch Hospital in Cardiff.

== Honours ==
Cardiff City

- Welsh Cup Winner: 4

1968–69, 1969–70, 1970–71, 1975–76

- Welsh Cup Runner-up: 1

1971–72

- Football League Third Division Runner-up: 1

1975–76
