= Frank Parsons (English footballer) =

English footballer

Personal information
- Full name: Frank Ronald Parsons
- Date of birth: 29 October 1947 (age 79)
- Place of birth: Amersham, Buckinghamshire, England
- Position: Goalkeeper

Youth career
- ?–1965: Crystal Palace

Senior career*
Years	Team	Apps	(Gls)
1965–1970	Crystal Palace	4	(0)
1970–1974	Cardiff City	17	(0)
1974	Fulham	0	(0)
1974–1975	Reading	1	(0)
1975–1977	Staines Town	?	(?)
1977–1980	Woking	?	(?)
1980–1983	Slough Town	?	(1)

International career
?	Wales under-23 team	?	(0)
?	Isthmian League XI	?	(?)
- * Club domestic league appearances and goals

Frank Ronald Parsons (born 29 October 1947) is an English-born, former professional footballer who represented Wales at under-23 level. He played as a goalkeeper in the Football League for Crystal Palace, Cardiff City and Reading, in addition to a brief spell at Fulham where he did not make an appearance. He also played non-league football for Staines Town, Woking, and Slough Town.

== Playing career ==
Parsons was born in Amersham, Buckinghamshire and began his youth career at Crystal Palace, signing professional terms in July 1965. However, his appearances were limited as John Jackson was the regular first team 'keeper. His four League appearances came at the end of the 1966–7 season, making his debut in a home 2–1 win over Birmingham City on 22 April. In August 1970, Parsons moved on to Cardiff City, where he made 17 appearances over the next four years, before brief spells at Fulham and Reading. Parsons then moved into non-league football with Staines Town in 1975. In 1977, he moved to Woking and subsequently joined Slough Town in 1980 for a fee of £3,000. He remained as a player with Slough Town until November 1983 and in October that year scored the winning goal in a 3–2 win over Hampton F.C in the FA Cup third qualifying round.

Although English-born, Parsons represented Wales at under-23 level and also played for an Isthmian League representative XI.

== Personal life ==
Parsons is married with two children and after retirement lived in the Eton area where he ran a newsagent's shop.
