= Jimmy Scoular =

Scottish footballer and manager (1925–1998)

Personal information
- Full name: James Scoular
- Date of birth: 11 January 1925
- Place of birth: Livingston Station, West Lothian, Scotland
- Date of death: 19 March 1998 (aged 73)
- Place of death: Cardiff, Wales
- Position: Wing half

Youth career
- Gosport Borough

Senior career*
Years	Team	Apps	(Gls)
1945–1953	Portsmouth	247	(8)
1953–1960	Newcastle United	247	(6)
1960–1964	Bradford Park Avenue	108	(5)
Total		602	(19)

International career
1951–1952	Scotland	9	(0)

Managerial career
- 1960–1964: Bradford Park Avenue
- 1964–1973: Cardiff City
- 1976–1977: Newport County
- * Club domestic league appearances and goals

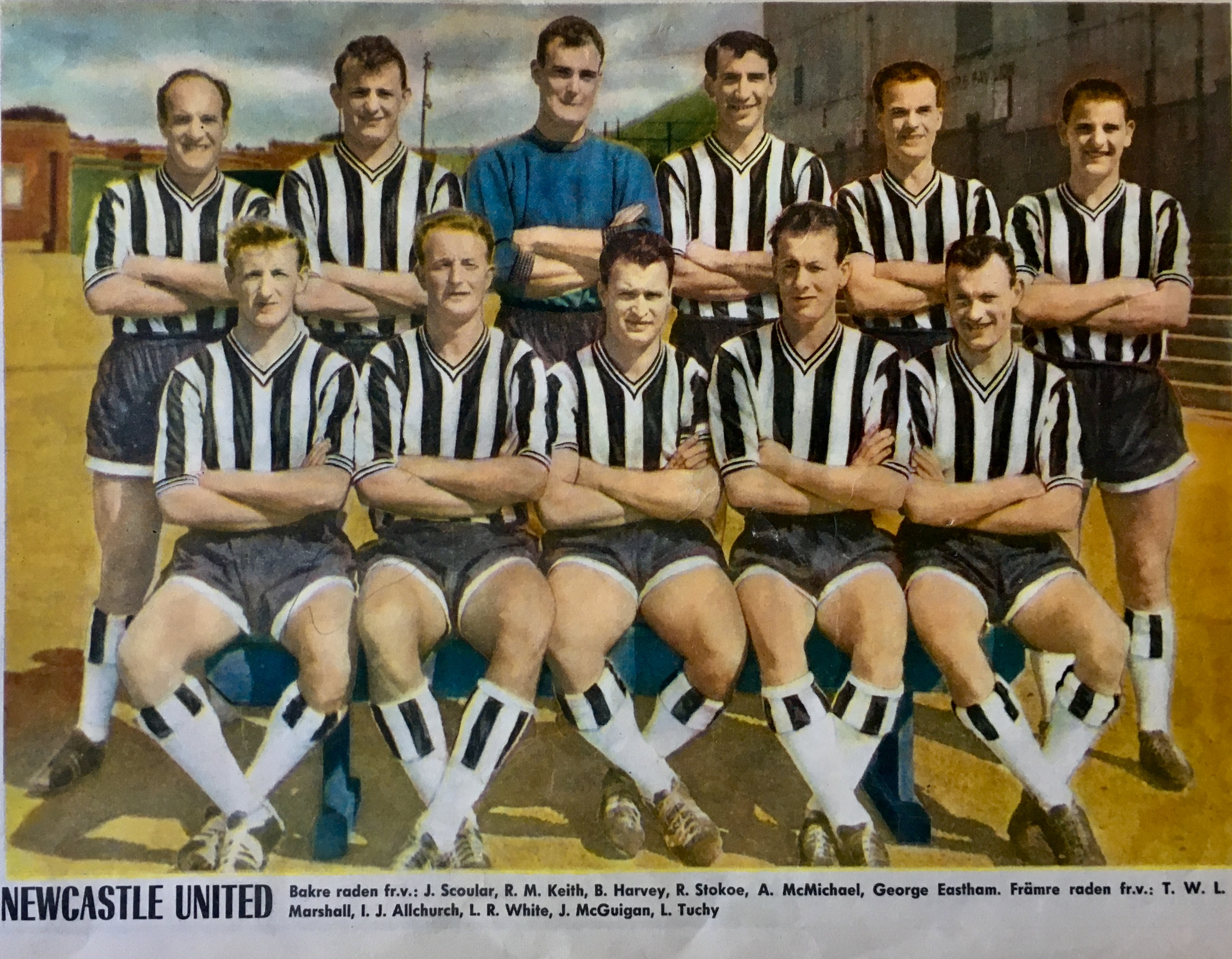
Newcastle United F.C. in 1960 with players from left, standing: James "Jimmy" Scoular, Richard Matthewson "Dick" Keith, Bryan Harvey (goalkeeper), Bob Stokoe, Alf McMichael and George Eastham; crouched from left: "Terry" W. L. Marshall, Ivor J. Allchurch, Leonard Roy "Len" White, John McGuigan and Liam Tuohy.

James Scoular (11 January 1925 – 19 March 1998) was a Scottish football player and manager. Known as a tough, combative player with precise passing skills, Scoular made over 600 appearances in the Football League with Portsmouth, Newcastle United and Bradford Park Avenue, as a player-manager, and attained nine caps for Scotland in a playing career spanning nearly twenty years. Following his retirement from playing, Scoular went on to manage Cardiff City and Newport County.

== Early life ==
Born in Livingston Station, West Lothian, Scoular's father Alec was also a footballer prior to the outbreak of the Second World War, playing for Alloa Athletic, Stenhousemuir and Leith Athletic. During the Second World War, Scoular became a submarine engineer on HMS Dolphin in Gosport.

== Playing career ==
=== Club ===
Scoular signed for Portsmouth in 1945 from Gosport Borough as part of the post-war rebuilding undertaken by manager Jack Tinn. He quickly established himself in the first team, forming a wing-half partnership with England international Jimmy Dickinson, impressing many with his tireless stamina and tough tackling, which lead Duncan Edwards to state that Scoular was "the finest tackler of the ball I ever saw" After helping the club to consecutive league titles in 1948–49 and 1949–50, Scoular's relationship with the club became strained and he left to sign for Newcastle United for a fee of £26,000 in 1953.

Handed the captaincy on his arrival, he made his debut for Newcastle against arch-rivals Sunderland in a Tyne–Wear derby on 22 August 1953. Two years later, Scoular captained Newcastle to victory in the 1955 FA Cup Final as they beat Manchester City 3–1. He stayed at the club until 1960 when Bradford Park Avenue paid £1,500 for his services, appointing him as player-manager at the age of 35. In his first full year at the club he steered them to promotion into Division Three but was unable to keep the club up and they were relegated back into Division Four in the 1962–63 season. In February 1964, Scoular retired from playing and was sacked as manager at Bradford Park Avenue four months later.

=== International ===
Scoular made his debut for Scotland on 12 May 1951 in 3–1 win over Denmark. He went on to win a further eight caps over the following year, winning his final cap on 5 November 1952 in a 1–1 draw with Northern Ireland.

== Managerial career ==
One month after his departure from Bradford, Scoular was appointed manager of Second Division side Cardiff City. His spell with the club started badly, failing to win any of his first twelve games in domestic competitions. His first win in charge of the club came on 13 October 1964 with a 1–0 victory over Danish side Esbjerg fB in the European Cup Winners' Cup. With the Welsh Cup winners awarded a place in the European Cup Winners' Cup, Cardiff became regular entrants into the competition, winning the Welsh Cup seven times in Scoular's nine years as manager. Having reached the quarter-finals in his first year, eventually being eliminated by Spanish side Real Zaragoza, three years later they went one step further, reaching the semi-finals before losing 4–3 on aggregate to Hamburg. To date, it remains the furthest any Welsh side has progressed in a European competition.

After almost achieving promotion in the 1970–71 season, the club's results slowly deteriorated, culminating in a 20th-place finish in 1972–73. With the team still struggling at the start of the following season, Scoular was sacked. He later managed Newport County until 1977 and also worked as a scout for Aston Villa, Wolverhampton Wanderers, Swansea City and Newcastle United.

== After retirement ==
Scoular later worked as a representative for a chemical firm before running a guest house in Cardiff. He died on 19 March 1998, aged 73.

== Managerial statistics ==
Team	Country	From	To	Record				
Team	Country	From	To	G	W	D	L	Win %
Cardiff City	Wales	1 June 1964	7 November 1973	427	143	117	167	33.49
Total				427	143	117	167	33.49

== Honours ==
=== As a player ===
Portsmouth

- Football League First Division: 1948–49, 1949–50
- FA Charity Shield: 1949 (shared)

Newcastle United

- FA Cup: 1954–55

=== As a manager ===
Cardiff City

- Welsh Cup: 1965, 1967, 1968, 1969, 1970, 1971, 1973
