= 1974–75 Cardiff City F.C. season =

Welsh football club season

Cardiff City
1974–75 season
- Chairman: David Goldstone
- Manager: Jimmy Andrews
- Football League Second Division: 21st
- FA Cup: 3rd round
- League Cup: 1st round
- European Cup Winners Cup: 1st round
- Welsh Cup: Runners-up
- Top goalscorer: League: Gil Reece (9); All: Gil Reece (10)
- Highest home attendance: 22,344 (v Manchester United, 31 August 1974)
- Lowest home attendance: 5,672 (v Hull City, 28 September 1974)
- Average home league attendance: 9,224
Home colours

The 1974–75 season was Cardiff City F.C.'s 48th season in the Football League. They competed in the 22-team Division Two, then the second tier of English football, finishing twenty-first, suffering relegation to Division Three.

== Players ==
Note: Flags indicate national team as defined under FIFA eligibility rules; some limited exceptions apply. Players may hold more than one non-FIFA nationality.

Pos.	Nation	Player
GK	ENG	Ron Healey
GK	NIR	Bill Irwin
GK	ENG	Terry Lee
DF	WAL	Bryan Attley
DF	ENG	Clive Charles
DF	WAL	Phil Dwyer
DF	ENG	John Impey
DF	NIR	Albert Larmour
DF	NIR	John McClelland
DF	WAL	Richie Morgan
DF	SCO	Don Murray
DF	WAL	Freddie Pethard
DF	WAL	David Powell
MF	ENG	Willie Anderson

Pos.	Nation	Player
MF	SCO	John Buchanan
MF	ENG	John Farrington
MF	WAL	David Giles
MF	WAL	Leighton Phillips
MF	WAL	Gil Reece
MF	WAL	Peter Sayer
MF	ENG	George Smith
MF	WAL	Tony Villars
MF	ENG	Johnny Vincent
FW	SCO	Steve Finnieston
FW	SCO	Jimmy McInch
FW	WAL	Derek Showers
FW	ENG	Jack Whitham

Source.

== League standings ==
Pos	Team	Pld	W	D	L	GF	GA	GAv	Pts	Qualification or relegation
18	Oldham Athletic	42	10	15	17	40	48	0.833	35	
19	Bristol Rovers	42	12	11	19	42	64	0.656	35	
20	Millwall (R)	42	10	12	20	44	56	0.786	32	Relegation to the Third Division
21	Cardiff City (R)	42	9	14	19	36	62	0.581	32	Relegation to the Third Division
22	Sheffield Wednesday (R)	42	5	11	26	29	64	0.453	21	Relegation to the Third Division

Rules for classification: 1) Points; 2) Goal average; 3) Goals scored
(R) Relegated

=== Results by round ===
Round	1	2	3	4	5	6	7	8	9	10	11	12	13	14	15	16	17	18	19	20	21	22	23	24	25	26	27	28	29	30	31	32	33	34	35	36	37	38	39	40	41	42
Ground	H	A	A	H	A	H	A	A	H	A	H	H	A	H	H	A	H	H	A	H	A	H	A	H	H	A	H	A	H	A	A	H	A	H	A	H	A	A	H	A	A	H
Result	D	L	L	L	W	L	D	L	L	L	L	W	L	W	W	D	W	D	D	D	L	D	D	W	W	L	D	L	L	D	L	D	D	D	W	W	L	L	D	L	L	L
Position	10	20	21	22	21	22	22	22	22	22	22	22	22	22	21	21	20	20	20	18	20	20	18	18	18	19	19	20	21	21	21	21	21	21	21	19	20	20	20	20	20	21
Points	1	1	1	1	3	3	4	4	4	4	4	6	6	8	10	11	13	14	15	16	16	17	18	20	22	22	23	23	23	24	24	25	26	27	29	31	31	31	32	32	32	32

Source: Competitive matches
A = Away; H = Home; W = Win; D = Draw; L = Loss

== Fixtures and results ==
=== Second Division ===
17 August 1974 1	Cardiff City	1–1	Oxford United	Cardiff
	Clive Charles 49'		42' Brian Heron	Stadium: Ninian Park; Attendance: 10,116; Referee: Peter Walters (Bridgewater)

24 August 1974 2	Fulham	4–0	Cardiff City	London
15:00	Jimmy Conway 3', 37'; Viv Busby 28', 47'			Stadium: Craven Cottage; Attendance: 8,110; Referee: Alex Lees (Somerset)

27 August 1974 3	York City	1–0	Cardiff City	York
19:30	Chris Jones 51'			Stadium: Bootham Crescent; Attendance: 6,321; Referee: A Porter (Bolton)

31 August 1974 4	Cardiff City	0–1	Manchester United	Cardiff
15:00			4' (pen.) Gerry Daly	Stadium: Ninian Park; Attendance: 22,344; Referee: Peter Reeves (Leicester)

7 September 1974 5	Sheffield Wednesday	1–2	Cardiff City	Sheffield
15:00	Albert Larmour 14' (o.g.)		32' Gil Reece; 39' Willie Anderson	Stadium: Hillsborough; Attendance: 9,850; Referee: George Courtney (Spennymoor)

14 September 1974 6	Cardiff City	0–1	Bristol City	Cardiff
			46' Keith Fear	Stadium: Ninian Park; Attendance: 8,856; Referee: John Hunting (Leicester)

21 September 1974 7	Portsmouth	2–2	Cardiff City	Portsmouth
15:00	Mick Mellows 52'; Norman Piper 66'		31' Derek Showers; 44' Johnny Vincent	Stadium: Fratton Park; Attendance: 9,519; Referee: Arthur Hart (London)

24 September 1974 8	Blackpool	4–0	Cardiff City	Blackpool
19:30	David Powell (o.g.); Stuart Parker; Paul Hart 60'; Wyn Davies 61'			Stadium: Bloomfield Road; Attendance: 5,579

28 September 1974 9	Cardiff City	1–2	Hull City	Cardiff
	Gil Reece 86'		53' Roy Greenwood; 76' Steve Deere	Stadium: Ninian Park; Attendance: 5,672; Referee: Clive White (Harrow)

5 October 1974 10	Bristol Rovers	1–0	Cardiff City	Bristol
15:00	Alan Warboys 73'			Stadium: Eastville; Attendance: 10,310; Referee: Bob Perkin (Stafford)

12 October 1974 11	Cardiff City	0–2	West Bromwich Albion	Cardiff
			69' Joe Mayo; 86' Barry Donaghy	Stadium: Ninian Park; Attendance: 6,723; Referee: John Homewood (Sunbury-On-Thames)

16 October 1974 12	Cardiff City	3–2	York City	Cardiff
	Johnny Vincent 21', 75' (pen.); Gil Reece 61'		28', 42' (pen.) Ian Holmes	Stadium: Ninian Park; Attendance: 5,883; Referee: Alan Turvey (Wickford, Essex)

19 October 1974 13	Bolton Wanderers	2–1	Cardiff City	Bolton
15:00	Hugh Curran 13', 75'		59' John Buchanan	Stadium: Burnden Park; Attendance: 9,439; Referee: Dennis Turner (Cannock)

26 October 1974 14	Cardiff City	3–1	Oldham Athletic	Cardiff
	Johnny Vincent 2'; John Buchanan 34'; Steve Finnieston 72'		9' Alan Young	Stadium: Ninian Park; Attendance: 6,751; Referee: Tony Glasson (Salisbury)

2 November 1974 15	Cardiff City	2–0	Sunderland	Cardiff
	Steve Finnieston 29'; Willie Anderson 67' (pen.)			Stadium: Ninian Park; Attendance: 9,883; Referee: Alan Robinson (Fareham)

9 November 1974 16	Orient	1–1	Cardiff City	London
15:00	Gerry Queen 32'		38' Phil Dwyer	Stadium: Brisbane Road; Attendance: 6,412; Referee: David Richardson (Clayton-le-Moors, Lancashire)

16 November 1974 17	Cardiff City	2–1	Nottingham Forest	Cardiff
15:00	Phil Dwyer 32'; Derek Showers 42'	Forest details	82' Neil Martin	Stadium: Ninian Park; Attendance: 9,401; Referee: Jim Bent (Hemel Hempstead)

29 November 1974 18	Cardiff City	2–2	Southampton	Cardiff
	Jack Whitham 10'; Derek Showers 59'		17' Peter Osgood; Bobby Stokes	Stadium: Ninian Park; Attendance: 10,668; Referee: Ken Baker (Rugby)

7 December 1974 19	Norwich City	1–1	Cardiff City	Norwich
15:00	Johnny Miller (22s)		53' Gil Reece	Stadium: Carrow Road; Attendance: 17,685; Referee: Robin Clay (Gainsborough)

11 December 1974 20	Cardiff City	0–0	Fulham	Cardiff
				Stadium: Ninian Park; Attendance: 8,458; Referee: John Yates (Redditch)

14 December 1974 21	Oxford United	1–0	Cardiff City	Oxford
15:00	Derek Clarke 73' (pen.)			Stadium: Manor Ground; Attendance: 8,107; Referee: Gordon Hill (Leicester)

21 December 1974 22	Cardiff City	0–0	Notts County	Cardiff
				Stadium: Ninian Park; Attendance: 6,671; Referee: Derek Civil (Birmingham)

26 December 1974 23	Bristol City	0–0	Cardiff City	Bristol
				Stadium: Ashton Gate; Attendance: 12,484; Referee: Ray Toseland (Kettering)

28 December 1974 24	Cardiff City	3–1	Aston Villa	Cardiff
	Derek Showers (74s); John Buchanan 22'; Jack Whitham 35'		57' Ian Hamilton	Stadium: Ninian Park; Attendance: 11,060; Referee: Clive White (Harrow)

11 January 1975 25	Cardiff City	2–1	Norwich City	Cardiff
	Gil Reece 10', 44'		65' Ted MacDougall	Stadium: Ninian Park; Attendance: 11,637; Referee: Derek Nippard (Bournemouth)

25 January 1975 26	Millwall	5–1	Cardiff City	London
15:00	Ray Evans 29'; Phil Summerill; Phil Summerill; Phil Summerill; Barry Kitchener		89' Gil Reece	Stadium: The Den; Attendance: 8,101; Referee: Alf Grey (Great Yarmouth)

1 February 1975 27	Cardiff City	0–0	Orient	Cardiff
				Stadium: Ninian Park; Attendance: 8,020; Referee: Harry New (Portsmouth)

8 February 1975 28	Sunderland	3–1	Cardiff City	Sunderland
15:00	Tony Towers 63' (pen.); Richie Morgan 67' (o.g.); Bryan Robson 72'		7' Willie Anderson	Stadium: Roker Park; Attendance: 29,315; Referee: Colin Seel (Carlisle)

14 February 1975 29	Cardiff City	0–1	Millwall	Cardiff
			61' Frank Saul	Stadium: Ninian Park; Attendance: 6,598; Referee: Jack Taylor (Wolverhampton)

22 February 1975 30	Nottingham Forest	0–0	Cardiff City	Nottingham
15:00		Forest report		Stadium: City Ground; Attendance: 12,806; Referee: Ray Tinkler (Boston)

1 March 1975 31	Manchester United	4–0	Cardiff City	Manchester
15:00	Stewart Houston 59'; Stuart Pearson 61'; Sammy McIlroy 85'; Lou Macari			Stadium: Old Trafford; Attendance: 43,601; Referee: Keith Styles (Barnsley)

8 March 1975 32	Cardiff City	1–1	Blackpool	Cardiff
	Gil Reece 33'		67' Bill Bentley	Stadium: Ninian Park; Attendance: 8,134; Referee: John Homewood (Sunbury-On-Thames)

15 March 1975 33	Hull City	1–1	Cardiff City	Hull
15:00	Malcolm Lord 14'		68' Derek Showers	Stadium: Boothferry Park; Attendance: 5,248; Referee: Bob Matthewson (Worsley)

22 March 1975 34	Cardiff City	0–0	Sheffield Wednesday	Cardiff
				Stadium: Ninian Park; Attendance: 6,637; Referee: Jim Bent (Hemel Hempstead)

29 March 1975 35	Notts County	0–2	Cardiff City	Nottingham
			11' Phil Dwyer; 88' Clive Charles	Stadium: Meadow Lane; Attendance: 8,105; Referee: Jack Rice (Preston)

2 April 1975 36	Cardiff City	1–0	Portsmouth	Cardiff
	Peter Sayer 30'			Stadium: Ninian Park; Attendance: 9,892; Referee: Ken Baker (Rugby)

5 April 1975 37	Oldham Athletic	4–0	Cardiff City	Oldham
15:00	Alan Young 5', 15'; George McVitie 16'; Albert Larmour 58' (o.g.)			Stadium: Boundary Park; Attendance: 10,243; Referee: Terry Bosi (Wolverhampton)

9 April 1975 38	Aston Villa	2–0	Cardiff City	Birmingham
	Brian Little 65', 75'			Stadium: Villa Park; Attendance: 32,748; Referee: Ralph (RB) Lee (Cheadle)

12 April 1975 39	Cardiff City	2–2	Bristol Rovers	Cardiff
	Phil Dwyer 71'; John McClelland 73'		47' Colin Dobson; 83' Frankie Prince	Stadium: Ninian Park; Attendance: 13,896; Referee: Ron Crabb (Exeter)

19 April 1975 40	West Bromwich Albion	2–0	Cardiff City	West Bromwich
15:00	Bryan Robson 10'; Ally Robertson 34'			Stadium: The Hawthorns; Attendance: 10,182; Referee: Gordon Trevett (Manchester)

22 April 1975 41	Southampton	2–0	Cardiff City	Southampton
19:30	Gerry O'Brien 36'; Mick Channon 56'			Stadium: The Dell; Attendance: 14,273

26 April 1975 42	Cardiff City	1–2	Bolton Wanderers	Cardiff
	Gil Reece 87'		34' Peter Nicholson; 57' Sam Allardyce	Stadium: Ninian Park; Attendance: 6,396; Referee: Ken Burns (Stourbridge)

=== League Cup ===
19 August 1974 Round 1	Bristol City	2–1	Cardiff City	Bristol
	Gerry Sweeney 31'; Geoff Merrick 55'		72' Jimmy McInch	Stadium: Ashton Gate; Attendance: 8,813

=== FA Cup ===
4 January 1975 Round 3	Leeds United	4–1	Cardiff City	Leeds
15:00	Eddie Gray 3'; Allan Clarke 5', 44'; Duncan McKenzie 45'		89' Derek Showers	Stadium: Elland Road; Attendance: 31,572; Referee: Dave Wallace (Crewe)

=== UEFA Cup Winners Cup ===
18 September 1974 Round 1 (First leg)	Ferencvaros	2–0	Cardiff City	Budapest
15:15	Tibor Nyilasi 15'; Ferenc Szabó 80'			Stadium: Stadion Albert Florian; Attendance: 26,000; Referee: Josef Bucek (Austria)

2 October 1974 Round 1 (Second leg)	Cardiff City	1–4 (1–6 agg.)	Ferencvaros	Cardiff
	Phil Dwyer 81'		52' Laszlo Takacs; 58' Ferenc Szabó; 63' Laszlo Pusztai; 89' Janos Mate	Stadium: Ninian Park; Attendance: 4,229; Referee: Francis Rion (Belgium)

=== Welsh Cup ===
14 January 1975 Round 4	Cardiff City	2–0	Hereford United	Cardiff
19:30	Gil Reece 68'; Derek Showers 82'			Stadium: Ninian Park; Attendance: 3,515

19 February 1975 Round 5	Cardiff City	4–0	Oswestry	Cardiff
	John Buchanan 55'; Derek Showers; David Giles 39'; John Buchanan			Stadium: Ninian Park; Attendance: 1,296

11 March 1975 Semi Final	Newport County	0–1	Cardiff City	Newport
19:15			53' Phil Dwyer	Stadium: Somerton Park; Attendance: 3,808; Referee: John Williams (Wrexham)

5 May 1975 Final (First leg)	Wrexham	2–1	Cardiff City	Wrexham
19:15	John Lyons 17'; Brian Tinnion 27'	Wrexham report	5' John Buchanan	Stadium: The Racecourse; Attendance: 6,862; Referee: John Gow (Swansea)

12 May 1975 Final (Second leg)	Cardiff City	1–3 (2–5 agg.)	Wrexham	Cardiff
19:30	Albert Larmour 77'	Wrexham report	10', 87' Billy Ashcroft; 86' Graham Whittle	Stadium: Ninian Park; Attendance: 3,280; Referee: John Gow (Swansea)

== See also ==
- Cardiff City F.C. seasons

== Bibliography ==
- Hayes, Dean (2006). The Who's Who of Cardiff City. Breedon Books. ISBN 1-85983-462-0.
- Shepherd, Richard (2002). The Definitive Cardiff City F.C. Tony Brown. ISBN 1-899-46817-X.
- Crooks, John (1992). Cardiff City Football Club: Official History of the Bluebirds. Yore Publications. ISBN 0-9513321-8-X.
- Crooks, John (1986). Cardiff City Chronology 1920-86. John Crooks. ISBN 0-9511984-0-8.
- Risoli, Mario (2014). From Tashkent With Love. St David's Press. ISBN 978-1-90271-941-2.
- "Football Club History Database – Cardiff City". Archived from the original on 30 December 2008.
- Welsh Football Data Archive
