= 1973–74 Cardiff City F.C. season =

Welsh football club season

Cardiff City
1973–74 season
- Chairman: David Goldstone
- Manager: Jimmy Scoular/Frank O'Farrell
- Football League Second Division: 17th
- FA Cup: 3rd round
- League Cup: 2nd round
- European Cup Winners Cup: 1st round
- Welsh Cup: Winners
- Top goalscorer: League: Andrew McCulloch (10); All: Andrew McCulloch (14)
- Highest home attendance: 26,781 (v Crystal Palace, 30 April 1974)
- Lowest home attendance: 5,839 (v Luton Town, 14 November 1973)
- Average home league attendance: 10,678
Home colours

The 1973–74 season was Cardiff City F.C.'s 47th season in the Football League. They competed in the 22-team Division Two, then the second tier of English football, finishing seventeenth.

Manager Jimmy Scoular, who had been in charge of the club for more than 9 years, left the club in November to be replaced by Frank O'Farrell.

== Players ==
Note: Flags indicate national team as defined under FIFA eligibility rules; some limited exceptions apply. Players may hold more than one non-FIFA nationality.

No.	Pos.	Nation	Player
--	GK	ENG	Peter Grotier
--	GK	ENG	Ron Healey
--	GK	NIR	Bill Irwin
--	DF	ENG	Gary Bell
--	DF	ENG	Clive Charles
--	DF	WAL	Phil Dwyer
--	DF	ENG	Roger Hoy
--	DF	ENG	John Impey
--	DF	NIR	Albert Larmour
--	DF	WAL	Richie Morgan
--	DF	SCO	Don Murray
--	DF	WAL	Freddie Pethard
--	DF	WAL	David Powell
--	MF	ENG	Willie Anderson

No.	Pos.	Nation	Player
--	MF	ENG	Willie Carlin
--	MF	ENG	John Farrington
--	MF	ENG	Peter King
--	MF	WAL	Leighton Phillips
--	MF	WAL	Gil Reece
--	MF	WAL	Peter Sayer
--	MF	ENG	George Smith
--	MF	WAL	Tony Villars
--	MF	ENG	Johnny Vincent
--	MF	ENG	Bobby Woodruff
--	FW	ENG	Andrew McCulloch
--	FW	SCO	Jimmy McInch
--	FW	WAL	Derek Showers
--	FW	ENG	Jack Whitham

Source.

== League standings ==
Pos	Team	Pld	W	D	L	GF	GA	GAv	Pts	Qualification or relegation
15	Portsmouth	42	14	12	16	45	62	0.726	40	
16	Bristol City	42	14	10	18	47	54	0.870	38	
17	Cardiff City	42	10	16	16	49	62	0.790	36	Qualification for the Cup Winners' Cup first round
18	Oxford United	42	10	16	16	35	46	0.761	36	
19	Sheffield Wednesday	42	12	11	19	51	63	0.810	35	

Rules for classification: 1) Points; 2) Goal average; 3) Goals scored

=== Results by round ===
Round	1	2	3	4	5	6	7	8	9	10	11	12	13	14	15	16	17	18	19	20	21	22	23	24	25	26	27	28	29	30	31	32	33	34	35	36	37	38	39	40	41	42
Ground	A	H	A	H	H	A	H	A	H	H	A	A	H	A	H	A	H	A	H	A	H	A	H	H	A	A	H	H	A	A	H	A	H	A	H	A	A	H	A	A	H	H
Result	D	D	D	W	D	D	L	L	W	L	L	D	L	L	D	L	W	W	D	L	L	D	W	W	L	W	D	W	L	L	L	D	W	L	L	D	D	W	D	L	D	D
Position	9	11	13	5	6	9	12	18	16	18	20	19	20	20	19	20	18	17	16	16	18	17	17	16	17	15	14	11	15	15	17	17	16	17	18	17	17	17	17	18	19	17
Points	1	2	3	5	6	7	7	7	9	9	9	10	10	10	11	11	13	15	16	16	16	17	19	21	21	23	24	26	26	26	26	27	29	29	29	30	31	33	34	34	35	36

Source: Competitive matches
A = Away; H = Home; W = Win; D = Draw; L = Loss

== Fixtures and results ==
=== Second Division ===
25 August 1973 1	Carlisle United	1–1	Cardiff City	Carlisle
	Frank Clarke 8'		86' (pen.) Gary Bell	Stadium: Brunton Park; Attendance: 6,863; Referee: Arthur Jones (Ormskirk, Lancashire)

1 September 1973 2	Cardiff City	1–1	Portsmouth	Cardiff
15:00	Andy McCulloch 48'		45' Norman Piper; (red card) Billy Wilson	Stadium: Ninian Park; Attendance: 10,110; Referee: Ray Toseland (Kettering)

8 September 1973 3	Sunderland	1–1	Cardiff City	Sunderland
	Ron Guthrie 68'		58' Johnny Vincent	Stadium: Roker Park; Attendance: 29,504; Referee: Keith Styles (Barnsley)

12 September 1973 4	Cardiff City	5–0	Oxford United	Cardiff
19:30	Andy McCulloch 3'; Andy McCulloch 8'; Tony Villars 23'; Clarke 52' (o.g.); Andy McCulloch 72'			Stadium: Ninian Park; Attendance: 8,572; Referee: Terry Bosi (Wolverhampton)

15 September 1973 5	Cardiff City	0–0	Fulham	Cardiff
15:00				Stadium: Ninian Park; Attendance: 11,251; Referee: Bill Castle (Dudley)

22 September 1973 6	Crystal Palace	3–3	Cardiff City	London
15:00	Martin Hinshelwood 2'; Paul Hinshelwood 11'; Don Rogers 72'		23' (o.g.) Mel Blyth; 45' Bobby Woodruff; 73' Johnny Vincent	Stadium: Selhurst Park; Attendance: 17,789; Referee: Ron Crabb (Exeter)

29 September 1973 7	Cardiff City	1–3	Hull City	Cardiff
15:00	Gary Bell 41'; Don Murray (red card)		6' Ken Wagstaff; 76' Malcolm Lord; 78' Malcolm Lord; (red card) Jimmy McGill	Stadium: Ninian Park; Attendance: 10,445; Referee: John Yates (Redditch)

6 October 1973 8	Aston Villa	5–0	Cardiff City	Birmingham
	Bobby Woodruff 6' (o.g.); Ray Graydon 10'; Bruce Rioch 61'; Sam Morgan 71'; Bruce Rioch 78'			Stadium: Villa Park; Attendance: 24,473; Referee: Michael Lowe (Sheffield)

13 October 1973 9	Cardiff City	1–0	Blackpool	Cardiff
15:00	Gil Reece 12'			Stadium: Ninian Park; Attendance: 7,693; Referee: Jim Bent (Hemel Hempstead)

20 October 1973 10	Cardiff City	0–1	Sheffield Wednesday	Cardiff
15:00			88' Ken Knighton	Stadium: Ninian Park; Attendance: 7,748; Referee: Malcolm Sinclair (Guildford)

24 October 1973 11	Oxford United	4–2	Cardiff City	Oxford
	Tommy Cassidy 16'; Billy Jeffrey 40'; Derek Clarke 58'; Derek Clarke 83'		33' Willie Anderson; 65' George Smith	Stadium: Manor Ground; Attendance: 6,127; Referee: Arthur Hart (London)

27 October 1973 12	Preston North End	2–2	Cardiff City	Preston
	Alex Spark 65'; Alex Bruce 75'		40' Andy McCulloch; 63' Gil Reece	Stadium: Deepdale; Attendance: 12,050; Referee: John Hunting (Leicester)

3 November 1973 13	Cardiff City	0–1	West Bromwich Albion	Cardiff
15:00			82' Tony Brown	Stadium: Ninian Park; Attendance: 10,668; Referee: Jack Rice (Leyland)

10 November 1973 14	Millwall	2–0	Cardiff City	London
15:00	Alf Wood 60'; Gordon Hill 67'			Stadium: The Den; Attendance: 8,075; Referee: Mike Kerkhof (Bicester)

14 November 1973 15	Cardiff City	0–0	Luton Town	Cardiff
19:30		Luton report		Stadium: Ninian Park; Attendance: 5,839; Referee: John Williams (Wrexham)

17 November 1973 16	Middlesbrough	3–0	Cardiff City	Middlesbrough
14:00	David Mills 36'; John Craggs 85'; Malcolm Smith 88'			Stadium: Ayresome Park; Attendance: 18,034

24 November 1973 17	Cardiff City	1–0	Bolton Wanderers	Cardiff
14:15	Gil Reece 22'			Stadium: Ninian Park; Attendance: 9,606; Referee: John Homewood (Sunbury-On-Thames)

1 December 1973 18	Orient	1–2	Cardiff City	London
14:00	Barrie Fairbrother 78'		29' Bobby Woodruff; 61' Andy McCulloch	Stadium: Brisbane Road; Attendance: 9,564; Referee: Les Hayes (Doncaster)

8 December 1973 19	Cardiff City	1–1	Nottingham Forest	Cardiff
14:00	Gil Reece 24'	Forest report	56' (pen.) George Lyall	Stadium: Ninian Park; Attendance: 10,339; Referee: Gordon Kew (Amersham)

12 December 1973 20	Luton Town	1–0	Cardiff City	Luton
19:30	Jim Ryan 47'	Luton report		Stadium: Kenilworth Road; Attendance: 7,135; Referee: Peter Reeves (Leicester)

15 December 1973 21	Cardiff City	0–1	Bristol City	Cardiff
14:00			79' Donnie Gillies	Stadium: Ninian Park; Attendance: 9,388; Referee: Roger Kirkpatrick (Leicester)

22 December 1973 22	Hull City	1–1	Cardiff City	Hull
14:00	Roy Greenwood 46'		61' John Farrington	Stadium: Boothferry Park; Attendance: 6,826; Referee: Derek Civil (Birmingham)

26 December 1973 23	Cardiff City	2–1	Swindon Town	Cardiff
14:00	John Farrington 27'; Don Murray 42'	Swindon report	47' Dave Syrett	Stadium: Ninian Park; Attendance: 10,071; Referee: David Smith (Stonehouse)

29 December 1973 24	Cardiff City	4–1	Sunderland	Cardiff
14:00	John Farrington 29'; Willie Anderson 40'; John Farrington 59'; John Farrington 88'		3' Vic Halom	Stadium: Ninian Park; Attendance: 14,799; Referee: Ron Challis (Tonbridge)

1 January 1974 25	Portsmouth	1–0	Cardiff City	Portsmouth
15:00	Bobby Kellard 62'			Stadium: Fratton Park; Attendance: 20,062; Referee: Harry Powell (Stourport-on-Severn)

12 January 1974 26	Fulham	0–1	Cardiff City	London
14:00			59' Andy McCulloch	Stadium: Craven Cottage; Attendance: 7,143; Referee: John Goggins (Manchester)

19 January 1974 27	Cardiff City	2–2	Carlisle United	Cardiff
11:15	Andy McCulloch 44'; Leighton Phillips 57'		47' Ray Train; 87' Frank Clarke	Stadium: Ninian Park; Attendance: 10,797; Referee: Harry New (Portsmouth)

26 January 1974 28	Cardiff City	1–0	Notts County	Cardiff
14:00	Leighton Phillips 87'			Stadium: Ninian Park; Attendance: 8,454; Referee: Derek Nippard (Bournemouth)

2 February 1974 29	Bristol City	3–2	Cardiff City	Bristol
14:15	Trevor Tainton 4'; Gerry Sweeney 74' (pen.); Gerry Sweeney 90'		15' Leighton Phillips; 26' Andy McCulloch	Stadium: Ashton Gate; Attendance: 24,487; Referee: Ken Baker (Rugby)

16 February 1974 30	Blackpool	2–1	Cardiff City	Blackpool
15:00	Alan Ainscow 5'; Alan Ainscow 71'		57' John Farrington	Stadium: Bloomfield Road; Attendance: 7,410; Referee: Keith Styles (Barnsley)

23 February 1974 31	Cardiff City	0–1	Aston Villa	Cardiff
14:30			(68s) Ray Graydon	Stadium: Ninian Park; Attendance: 12,310; Referee: Brian Daniels (Rainham)

2 March 1974 32	Swindon Town	1–1	Cardiff City	Swindon
15:00	Roy Compton 57'	Swindon report	22' David Powell	Stadium: County Ground; Attendance: 5,126; Referee: Tony Oliver (Leigh On Sea)

9 March 1974 33	Cardiff City	2–0	Preston North End	Cardiff
15:00	Phil Dwyer 46'; Jack Whitham 85'			Stadium: Ninian Park; Attendance: 7,216; Referee: Alex Lees (Somerset)

16 March 1974 34	Sheffield Wednesday	5–0	Cardiff City	Sheffield
15:00	Eric Potts 11'; Tommy Craig 35'; Brian Joicey 74'; Alan Thompson 81'; Brian Joicey 89'			Stadium: Hillsborough; Attendance: 13,841; Referee: Ray Toseland (Kettering)

23 March 1974 35	Cardiff City	1–3	Millwall	Cardiff
15:00	Andy McCulloch 57'		13' Harry Cripps; 56' Brian Clark; 89' Gordon Hill	Stadium: Ninian Park; Attendance: 7,662; Referee: Gordon Hill

30 March 1974 36	West Bromwich Albion	2–2	Cardiff City	West Bromwich
15:00	Don Murray 3' (o.g.); David Shaw 7'		60' Johnny Vincent; 87' (pen.) Johnny Vincent	Stadium: The Hawthorns; Attendance: 11,489; Referee: David Richardson (Lancashire)

6 April 1974 37	Bolton Wanderers	1–1	Cardiff City	Bolton
15:00	Alan Waldron 67'		57' Gil Reece	Stadium: Burnden Park; Attendance: 14,857; Referee: Derek Civil

13 April 1974 38	Cardiff City	3–2	Middlesbrough	Cardiff
15:00	Gil Reece 6'; Willie Carlin 38'; Johnny Vincent 64'		59' Graeme Souness; 88' Alan Foggon	Stadium: Ninian Park; Attendance: 12,856; Referee: John Hunting (Leicester)

15 April 1974 39	Notts County	1–1	Cardiff City	Nottingham
15:00	Kevin Randall 11'		Willie Anderson	Stadium: Meadow Lane; Attendance: 6,975; Referee: Dave Wallace (Crewe)

20 April 1974 40	Nottingham Forest	2–1	Cardiff City	Nottingham
15:00	George Lyall 16'; Duncan McKenzie 21'	Forest report	6' Johnny Vincent	Stadium: The City Ground; Attendance: 11,128; Referee: Ralph Lee (Cheadle)

27 April 1974 41	Cardiff City	1–1	Orient	Cardiff
15:00	Gil Reece 22'		19' Mick Bullock	Stadium: Ninian Park; Attendance: 11,640; Referee: John Hough (Macclesfield)

30 April 1974 42	Cardiff City	1–1	Crystal Palace	Cardiff
19:30	Tony Villars 39'		28' Roy Barry	Stadium: Ninian Park; Attendance: 26,781; Referee: Jack Taylor (Wolverhampton)

=== League Cup ===
29 August 1973 1	Cardiff City	2–0	Hereford United	Cardiff
19:30	Andy McCulloch 43', 57'			Stadium: Ninian Park; Attendance: 9,821; Referee: Trevor Spencer (Wootton Bassett)

10 October 1973 2	Cardiff City	2–2	Burnley	Cardiff
19:30	Andy McCulloch 58'; Johnny Vincent 89'		24', 65' Leighton James; (red card) 80' Colin Waldron	Stadium: Ninian Park; Attendance: 8,775; Referee: Peter Walters (Bridgwater)

16 October 1973 2 (replay)	Burnley	3–2 (a.e.t.)	Cardiff City	Burnley
19:30	Ray Hankin 68'; Leighton James 95' (pen.), 111'		75' Bobby Woodruff; 98' (pen.) Gary Bell	Stadium: Turf Moor; Attendance: 12,303; Referee: Harold Williams (Sheffleid)

=== FA Cup ===
5 January 1974 3	Birmingham City	5–2	Cardiff City	Birmingham
	Trevor Francis 3'; Bob Latchford 36', 66'; Bob Hatton 76', 88'		55' John Impey; 56' Andy McCulloch	Stadium: St Andrew's; Attendance: 22,435; Referee: Gordon Hill

=== European Cup Winners Cup ===
19 September 1973 1 (First Leg)	Cardiff City	0–0	Sporting CP	Cardiff
19:30				Stadium: Ninian Park; Attendance: 13,300; Referee: Tonio Briguglio (Malta)

3 October 1973 1 (Second Leg)	Sporting CP	2–1 (2–1 agg.)	Cardiff City	Lisbon
	Hector Yazalde 24'; Samuel Fraguito 51'		40' Tony Villars	Stadium: Estádio José Alvalade; Attendance: 35,000; Referee: Jacques Colling (Luxembourg)

=== Welsh Cup ===
9 January 1974 Round 4	Cardiff City	1–0	Ton Pentre	Cardiff
14:15	John Impey 26'			Stadium: Ninian Park; Attendance: 856; Referee: LEA Howells (Port Talbot)

21 February 1974 Round 5	Oswestry Town	1–3	Cardiff City	Oswestry
	89'		24' Gil Reece; 78' (pen.) Gil Reece; 79' John Farrington; (red card) Bill Irwin	Stadium: Victoria Road; Attendance: 2,500; Referee: Kevin McNally (Wirral)

13 March 1974 Semi Final	Shrewsbury Town	1–2	Cardiff City	Shrewsbury
15:00	Alan Durban 74'		62' Derek Showers; 68' Don Murray	Stadium: Gay Meadow; Attendance: 1,193

24 April 1974 Final (First leg)	Stourbridge	0–1	Cardiff City	Stourbridge
			35' Derek Showers	Stadium: War Memorial Athletic Ground; Attendance: 5,729; Referee: Iorwerth Jones (Treharris)

6 May 1974 Final (Second leg)	Cardiff City	1–0 (2–0 agg.)	Stourbridge	Cardiff
19:30	Gil Reece 48'			Stadium: Ninian Park; Attendance: 4,030; Referee: Iorwerth Jones (Treharris)

== See also ==
- Cardiff City F.C. seasons

== Bibliography ==
- Hayes, Dean (2006). The Who's Who of Cardiff City. Breedon Books. ISBN 1-85983-462-0.
- Shepherd, Richard (2002). The Definitive Cardiff City F.C. Tony Brown. ISBN 1-899-46817-X.
- Crooks, John (1992). Cardiff City Football Club: Official History of the Bluebirds. Yore Publications. ISBN 0-9513321-8-X.
- "Football Club History Database – Cardiff City". Archived from the original on 30 December 2008.
- Welsh Football Data Archive
