= 1975–76 Cardiff City F.C. season =

Welsh football club season

Cardiff City F.C.
1975–76 season
- Chairman: Stefan Terlezki
- Manager: Jimmy Andrews
- Football League Third Division: 2nd
- FA Cup: 4th round
- League Cup: 1st round
- Welsh Cup: Winners
- Top goalscorer: League: Tony Evans (21); All: Tony Evans (29)
- Highest home attendance: 35,549 (v Hereford United, 14 April 1976)
- Lowest home attendance: 6,259 (v Bury, 23 August 1975)
- Average home league attendance: 11,696
Home colours

The 1975–76 season was Cardiff City F.C.'s 49th season in the Football League. They competed in the 24-team Division Three, then the third tier of English football, finishing second, winning promotion to Division Two on the first attempt after being relegated the previous year.

Manager Jimmy Andrews brought a number of changes to the squad including bringing Brian Clark back to the club and signing Australian international Adrian Alston.

== Players ==
First team squad.

Note: Flags indicate national team as defined under FIFA eligibility rules; some limited exceptions apply. Players may hold more than one non-FIFA nationality.

No.	Pos.	Nation	Player
--	GK	ENG	Ron Healey
--	GK	NIR	Bill Irwin
--	DF	WAL	Bryan Attley
--	DF	ENG	Clive Charles
--	DF	WAL	Phil Dwyer
--	DF	WAL	Mike England
--	DF	NIR	Albert Larmour
--	DF	WAL	Richie Morgan
--	DF	WAL	Freddie Pethard
--	MF	ENG	Willie Anderson
--	MF	SCO	John Buchanan

No.	Pos.	Nation	Player
--	MF	SCO	Alan Campbell
--	MF	ENG	Joe Durrell
--	MF	WAL	David Giles
--	MF	ENG	Doug Livermore
--	MF	WAL	Gil Reece
--	MF	WAL	Peter Sayer
--	MF	WAL	Tony Villars
--	FW	AUS	Adrian Alston
--	FW	ENG	Brian Clark
--	FW	ENG	Tony Evans
--	FW	WAL	Derek Showers

== League standings ==
Pos	Team	Pld	W	D	L	GF	GA	GAv	Pts	Qualification or relegation
1	Hereford United (C, P)	46	26	11	9	86	55	1.564	63	Promotion to the Second Division
2	Cardiff City (P)	46	22	13	11	69	48	1.438	57	Cup Winners' Cup preliminary round and promotion to the Second Division
3	Millwall (P)	46	20	16	10	54	43	1.256	56	Promotion to the Second Division
4	Brighton & Hove Albion	46	22	9	15	78	53	1.472	53	
5	Crystal Palace	46	18	17	11	61	46	1.326	53	

Rules for classification: 1) Points; 2) Goal average; 3) Goals scored
(C) Champions; (P) Promoted

=== Results by round ===
Round	1	2	3	4	5	6	7	8	9	10	11	12	13	14	15	16	17	18	19	20	21	22	23	24	25	26	27	28	29	30	31	32	33	34	35	36	37	38	39	40	41	42	43	44	45	46
Ground	A	H	A	H	A	H	A	A	H	A	H	A	A	H	H	A	H	H	A	H	A	H	H	A	H	H	A	A	H	A	H	H	A	A	H	A	A	H	A	H	H	A	H	H	A	A
Result	L	D	W	L	W	D	L	L	W	L	W	L	D	W	D	D	W	W	W	W	L	W	L	D	W	W	L	W	W	L	D	W	D	D	D	W	L	D	W	W	W	W	W	D	D	W
Position	21	19	15	19	12	13	14	17	14	17	15	16	17	10	12	13	10	7	5	5	7	3	6	6	6	6	6	5	5	6	6	5	5	4	4	4	5	6	4	5	2	2	2	2	2	2
Points	0	1	3	3	5	6	6	6	8	8	10	10	11	13	14	15	17	19	21	23	23	25	25	26	28	30	30	32	34	34	35	37	38	39	40	42	42	43	45	47	49	51	53	54	55	57

A = Away; H = Home; W = Win; D = Draw; L = Loss

== Fixtures & Results ==
=== Third Division ===
16 August 1975 1	Grimsby Town	2–0	Cardiff City	Grimsby
	Jack Lewis; Phil Hubbard 60'			Stadium: Blundell Park; Attendance: 6,494; Referee: Gordon Trevett (Eccles)

23 August 1975 2	Cardiff City	1–1	Bury	Cardiff
	Tony Villars 23'		60' Hughen Riley	Stadium: Ninian ParkW; Attendance: 6,664; Referee: Ray Lewis (Great Bookham, Surrey)

30 August 1975 3	Brighton & Hove Albion	0–1	Cardiff City	Brighton
15:00			72' Tony Villars	Stadium: Goldstone Ground; Attendance: 11,353; Referee: Tony Glasson (Salisbury)

6 September 1975 4	Cardiff City	0–1	Crystal Palace	Cardiff
15:00			90' David Kemp	Stadium: Ninian Park; Attendance: 10,479; Referee: Derek Civil (Birmingham)

13 September 1975 5	Mansfield Town	1–4	Cardiff City	Mansfield
	Terry Eccles 73' (pen.)		31' David Giles; 52' Phil Dwyer; 62' (pen.) Gil Reece; 70' Gil Reece	Stadium: Field Mill; Attendance: 6,682; Referee: George Courtney (Spennymoor)

20 September 1975 6	Cardiff City	0–0	Halifax Town	Cardiff
15:00				Stadium: Ninian Park; Attendance: 8,035; Referee: Ken Ridden (Shrewsbury)

22 September 1975 7	Port Vale	2–1	Cardiff City	Burslem
	Mick Cullerton 19'; Terry Lees 48'		84' Brian Attley	Stadium: Vale Park; Attendance: 5,143; Referee: Ray Chadwick (Darwen)

27 September 1975 8	Preston North End	3–1	Cardiff City	Preston
	Mike Elwiss 16'; Ray Treacy 40'; Tony Morley 51' (pen.)		47' Tony Evans	Stadium: Deepdale; Attendance: 8,103; Referee: Bert Newsome (Broseley Salop)

4 October 1975 9	Cardiff City	3–0	Wrexham	Cardiff
15:00	Phil Dwyer 42', 57'; Tony Evans 68'	Wrexham report		Stadium: Ninian Park; Attendance: 7,653; Referee: Mike Taylor (Deal)

11 October 1975 10	Rotherham United	1–0	Cardiff City	Rotherham
	Mike England 40' (o.g.)			Stadium: Millmoor; Attendance: 4,272; Referee: Jack Rice (Preston)

18 October 1975 11	Cardiff City	2–0	Sheffield Wednesday	Cardiff
15:00	Tony Evans 71'; Jimmy Quinn 89' (o.g.)			Stadium: Ninian Park; Attendance: 7,930; Referee: Leslie Burden (Dorset)

22 October 1975 12	Aldershot	2–1	Cardiff City	Aldershot
	Pat Morrissey 25'; Gary Bell 88'		32' (pen.) Willie Anderson	Stadium: Recreation Ground; Attendance: 3,687; Referee: Bryan James (South Croydon)

25 October 1975 13	Chester	1–1	Cardiff City	Chester
	Graham Pugh 9'		28' Tony Evans	Stadium: Sealand Road; Attendance: 5,348; Referee: Ken Baker (Rugby)

31 October 1975 14	Cardiff City	4–3	Chesterfield	Cardiff
19:30	Adrian Alston 6'; Adrian Alston 28'; Tony Evans 30'; Willie Anderson 68'		58' Shaun O'Neill; 63' David McElvaney; 86' Terry Shanahan	Stadium: Ninian Park; Attendance: 7,512; Referee: Tom Bune (Sussex)

4 November 1975 15	Cardiff City	0–0	Walsall	Cardiff
19:30				Stadium: Ninian Park; Attendance: 8,884; Referee: Bryan James (Croydon)

8 November 1975 16	Gillingham	2–2	Cardiff City	Gillingham
15:00	Damien Richardson 51' (pen.); George Jacks 73'	Gillingham report	49' Willie Anderson; 75' Tony Evans	Stadium: Priestfield Stadium; Attendance: 5,762; Referee: Gordon Kew (Leeds)

15 November 1975 17	Cardiff City	2–0	Colchester United	Cardiff
15:00	Tony Evans (66s); Adrian Alston 82'			Stadium: Ninian Park; Attendance: 6,781; Referee: Terry Bosi (Wolverhampton)

29 November 1975 18	Cardiff City	3–0	Shrewsbury Town	Cardiff
15:00	Willie Anderson 26'; Tony Evans; Adrian Alston			Stadium: Ninian Park; Attendance: 8,002; Referee: Malcolm Sinclair (Guildford)

6 December 1975 19	Millwall	1–3	Cardiff City	London
	Terry Brisley 80'		46' Gil Reece; 53' Gil Reece; 87' Tony Evans	Stadium: The Den; Attendance: 6,092; Referee: Derek Nippard (Bournemouth)

22 December 1975 20	Cardiff City	3–1	Southend United	Cardiff
19:30	Tony Evans 28'; Tony Evans 58'; Adrian Alston 78'		68' Alan Little	Stadium: Ninian Park; Attendance: 9,342; Referee: Ron Crabb (Exeter)

26 December 1975 21	Swindon Town	4–0	Cardiff City	Swindon
	Trevor Anderson 28'; Peter Eastoe 43'; Frank Burrows 69'; Wilf Dixon 79'			Stadium: County Ground; Attendance: 10,003; Referee: Clive White (Harrow)

27 December 1975 22	Cardiff City	5–2	Peterborough United	Cardiff
15:00	Willie Anderson 42'; Phil Dwyer 47'; Phil Dwyer 74'; Tony Evans 76'; Tony Evans 80'		3' Lyndon Hughes; 79' David Gregory	Stadium: Ninian Park; Attendance: 16,094; Referee: Derek Lloyd (Worcester)

10 January 1976 23	Cardiff City	0–1	Brighton & Hove Albion	Cardiff
15:00			77' Ian Mellor	Stadium: Ninian Park; Attendance: 17,728; Referee: Peter Reeves (Leicester)

17 January 1976 24	Halifax Town	1–1	Cardiff City	Halifax
	Albert Phelan 89'		59' Mike England	Stadium: The Shay; Attendance: 2,399; Referee: Colin Seel (Carlisle)

20 January 1976 25	Cardiff City	1–0	Mansfield Town	Cardiff
19:30	Tony Evans 89'			Stadium: Ninian Park; Attendance: 10,161; Referee: John Yates (Redditch)

31 January 1976 26	Cardiff City	1–0	Aldershot	Cardiff
15:00	Adrian Alston 19'			Stadium: Ninian Park; Attendance: 8,934; Referee: Lester Shapter (Paignton)

4 February 1976 27	Hereford United	4–1	Cardiff City	Hereford
	Dixie McNeil 8'; Dixie McNeil 15'; Steve Emery 25'; John Layton 79'		75' John Buchanan	Stadium: Edgar Street; Attendance: 12,962; Referee: Bran H Daniels (Rainham)

7 February 1976 28	Walsall	2–3	Cardiff City	Walsall
	Alan Buckley 2'; Alan Buckley 17'		51' Adrian Alston; 68' Adrian Alston; 81' Phil Dwyer	Stadium: Fellows Park; Attendance: 7,109; Referee: George Nolan (Cheshire)

14 February 1976 29	Cardiff City	4–1	Gillingham	Cardiff
15:00	Doug Livermore 43'; John Buchanan 60'; Tony Evans 83'; Adrian Alston 88'	Gillingham report	44' (o.g.) Richie Morgan	Stadium: Ninian Park; Attendance: 11,025; Referee: Ray Toseland (Kettering)

21 February 1976 30	Colchester United	3–2	Cardiff City	Colchester
	Colin Garwood 54'; John Froggatt 60'; Colin Garwood 81'		18' Phil Dwyer; 84' (pen.) Willie Anderson	Stadium: Layer Road; Attendance: 3,248; Referee: Brian Martin (Keyworth, Nottingham)

25 February 1976 31	Cardiff City	1–1	Port Vale	Cardiff
19:30	Doug Livermore 86'		21' Ray Williams	Stadium: Ninian Park; Attendance: 9,129; Referee: Leslie Burden (Dorset)

28 February 1976 32	Cardiff City	2–0	Chester	Cardiff
15:00	Adrian Alston 63'; John Buchanan 73'			Stadium: Ninian Park; Attendance: 10,000; Referee: Alan Robinson (Fareham)

6 March 1976 33	Chesterfield	1–1	Cardiff City	Chesterfield
	Rodney Fern 88'		3' Adrian Alston	Stadium: Saltergate; Attendance: 4,095; Referee: Bert Newsome (Broseley Salop)

8 March 1976 34	Wrexham	1–1	Cardiff City	Wrexham
19:15	Graham Whittle 76'	Wrexham report	60' Tony Evans	Stadium: Racecourse Ground; Attendance: 5,674; Referee: Bob Matthewson (Worsley)

13 March 1976 35	Cardiff City	1–1	Rotherham United	Cardiff
15:00	Adrian Alston 10'		30' Dave Gwyther	Stadium: Ninian Park; Attendance: 11,072; Referee: Jim Bent (Hemel Hempstead)

17 March 1976 36	Sheffield Wednesday	1–3	Cardiff City	Sheffield
	Jimmy Quinn 89'		69' Tony Evans; 79' Clive Charles; 85' Brian Clark	Stadium: Hillsborough; Attendance: 8,867; Referee: Keith Butcher (Kendal)

20 March 1976 37	Shrewsbury Town	3–1	Cardiff City	Shrewsbury
15:00	Ian Atkins 56' (pen.); Sammy Irvine 57'; Alex McGregor 74'		89' Tony Evans	Stadium: Gay Meadow; Attendance: 7,573; Referee: Ken Salmon (Barnet)

27 March 1976 38	Cardiff City	0–0	Millwall	Cardiff
15:00				Stadium: Ninian Park; Attendance: 12,511; Referee: Allan Hughes (West Kirby)

29 March 1976 39	Southend United	0–2	Cardiff City	Southend
19:30			13' Phil Dwyer; 40' Tony Evans	Stadium: Roots Hall; Attendance: 4,596; Referee: Jeff Sewell (Quorn, Leicester)

3 April 1976 40	Cardiff City	2–1	Grimsby Town	Cardiff
15:00	Tony Evans 53'; John Buchanan 62'		12' Jack Lewis	Stadium: Ninian Park; Attendance: 9,645; Referee: Tom Bune (Sussex)

7 April 1976 41	Cardiff City	1–0	Preston North End	Cardiff
19:30	Tony Evans 45'			Stadium: Ninian Park; Attendance: 12,447; Referee: Ray Lewis (Great Bookham, Surrey)

10 April 1976 42	Crystal Palace	0–1	Cardiff City	London
			81' Adrian Alston	Stadium: Selhurst Park; Attendance: 25,604; Referee: George Flint (Kirby in Ashfield)

14 April 1976 43	Cardiff City	2–0	Hereford United	Cardiff
19:30	Doug Livermore 54'; Alan Campbell 87'			Stadium: Ninian Park; Attendance: 35,549; Referee: Trevor Spencer (Wootton Bassett)

17 April 1976 44	Cardiff City	0–0	Swindon Town	Cardiff
15:00				Stadium: Ninian Park; Attendance: 23,428; Referee: Derek Lloyd (Worcester)

19 April 1976 45	Peterborough United	0–0	Cardiff City	Peterborough
				Stadium: London Road Stadium; Attendance: 6,846; Referee: John Hough (Macclesfield)

4 May 1976 46	Bury	0–1	Cardiff City	Bury
			16' Adrian Alston	Stadium: Gigg Lane; Attendance: 7,135; Referee: John Hunting (Leicester)

=== League Cup ===
20 August 1975 Round 1 (1st leg)	Cardiff City	1–2	Bristol Rovers	Cardiff
19.30	Gil Reece 44' (pen.)		40' Alan Warboys; 48' Bruce Bannister	Stadium: Ninian Park; Attendance: 6,688; Referee: Jack Taylor (Wolverhampton)

26 August 1975 Round 1 (2nd leg)	Bristol Rovers	1–1 (3–2 agg.)	Cardiff City	Bristol
	Kenny Stephens 42'		31' Brian Clark	Stadium: Eastville; Attendance: 7,720

=== FA Cup ===
22 November 1975 Round 1	Cardiff City	6–2	Exeter City	Cardiff
15:00	Gil Reece 17'; Adrian Alston 33'; Adrian Alston 37'; Adrian Alston 63'; Tony Evans 65'; Gil Reece 87'		8' Alan Beer; 62' Lammie Robertson	Stadium: Ninian Park; Attendance: 7,532; Referee: Tony Morrissey (Bramhall)

13 December 1975 Round 2	Cardiff City	1–0	Wycombe Wanderers	Cardiff
15:00	Tony Evans 42'			Stadium: Ninian Park; Attendance: 11,607; Referee: Lester Shapter (Paignton)

3 January 1976 Round 3	Orient	0–1	Cardiff City	London
			35' Adrian Alston	Stadium: Brisbane Road; Attendance: 8,031; Referee: Ray Toseland (Kettering)

24 January 1976 Round 4	Southend United	2–1	Cardiff City	Southend
15:15	Stuart Parker 43'; Stuart Parker 89'		42' Tony Evans	Stadium: Roots Hall; Attendance: 12,863; Referee: Peter Walters (Bridgewater)

=== Welsh Cup ===
14 January 1976 Round 5	Cardiff City	5–0	Sully	Cardiff
19:30	Tony Evans 43'; Tony Evans 56'; Tony Evans 75'; Doug Livermore 25'; John Buchanan 41'			Stadium: Ninian Park; Attendance: 3,260

17 February 1976 Round 6	Cardiff City	1–1	Swansea City	Cardiff
19:30	Dave Bruton 29' (o.g.)		57' Dave Bruton	Stadium: Ninian Park; Attendance: 5,812; Referee: Clive Thomas (Treorchy)

2 March 1976 Round 6 (Replay)	Swansea City	0–3	Cardiff City	Swansea
			35' Brian Clark; 72' Adrian Alston; 80' Adrian Alston	Stadium: Vetch Field; Attendance: 10,056

23 March 1976 Semi Final	Chester City	0–0	Cardiff City	Chester
				Stadium: Sealand Road; Attendance: 3,743

1 April 1976 Semi Final (Replay)	Cardiff City	1–0	Chester City	Cardiff
19:30	Chris Dunleavy 74' (o.g.)			Stadium: Ninian Park; Attendance: 4,244

18 May 1976 Final (First leg)	Hereford United	3–3	Cardiff City	Hereford
19:30	Steve Davey 67'; Terry Paine 68'; Dixie McNeil 75'		28' Tony Evans; 62' Phil Dwyer; 87' Phil Dwyer	Stadium: Edgar Street; Attendance: 3,709; Referee: Clive Thomas (Treorchy)

19 May 1976 Final (Second leg - replayed)	Cardiff City	3–2 (6–5 agg.)	Hereford United	Cardiff
19:30	Freddie Pethard 13'; Brian Clark 33'; Tony Evans 68'		51' Jimmy Lindsay; 87' Tony Byrne	Stadium: Ninian Park; Attendance: 2,648; Referee: Clive Thomas (Treorchy)

Note - the original first leg of the final, played at Ninian Park on 29 April, was declared to be null and void by the Welsh FA, because the scorer of both Hereford's goals in the 2–2 draw was deemed to be ineligible.

== See also ==
- Cardiff City F.C. seasons
