= Wales national football team results (1980–1999) =

The Wales national football team represents Wales in international association football and is governed by the Football Association of Wales (FAW). Between 1980 and 1999 the side played 133 matches, the majority of which came against other European national teams. The British Home Championship, which had been held every year outside wartime since 1894, was disbanded in 1984. The decision to end the competition in its 100th year was blamed largely on low attendance figures, football hooliganism and England and Scotland's desire to play other opponents. Wales came within one match of winning the tournament in the 1980–81 season. They needed only to beat Northern Ireland, but the final game was never played after players refused to travel following an escalation of The Troubles in Ireland. Northern Ireland won the last tournament, held in the 1983–84 season, on goal difference as all four sides finished on equal points.

During this time period, Wales also saw an improvement in their hopes of qualifying for a major tournament. They came close to qualifying for both the 1982 FIFA World Cup, losing out on goal difference to Czechoslovakia, and the 1984 European Championships. In the latter, a late goal for Yugoslavia in their final match against Bulgaria saw them overtake Wales to win the qualifying group. Wales narrowly failed to qualify for the third consecutive tournament, the 1986 FIFA World Cup, as they drew a decisive qualifying match against Scotland. A defeat in their last qualifying game against Germany, coupled with their opponents' subsequent victories in their last matches, led to Germany winning the group and the resulting qualification place for the 1992 European Championships. A similar defeat against Romania in 1993 resulted in Wales failing to qualify for the 1994 FIFA World Cup.

Of the 133 matches played by Wales during the period, they won 47, drew 28 and lost the remaining 58. The team was most successful against Scotland, Iceland and the Republic of Ireland, winning three times against each side. They were least successful against the Netherlands, losing all five meetings between the sides and conceding 17 goals in the process. Their biggest victories were 6–0 wins over the Faroe Islands in 1992 and San Marino in 1996, while their biggest defeat was a 7–1 loss to the Netherlands, also in 1996.

== Results ==
Wales' score is shown first in each case. The colours listed below are also used to signify results combined with the scoreline.

Key
Colour (with score)	Meaning
	Defeat
	Draw
	Win

Wales national football team results 1980–1999 (Note: Table information sourced from the references listed in the statistics section below)
Match no.	Date	Venue	H/A/N	Opponents	Score	Competition	Wales scorers	Att.
352	17 May 1980	Racecourse Ground, Wrexham	H	England	4–1	1979–80 British Home Championship	Mickey Thomas, Ian Walsh, Leighton James, Phil Thompson (o.g.)	24,386
353	21 May 1980	Hampden Park, Glasgow	A	Scotland	0–1	1979–80 British Home Championship		31,359
354	23 May 1980	Ninian Park, Cardiff	H	Northern Ireland	0–1	1979–80 British Home Championship		12,913
355	2 June 1980	Laugardalsvöllur, Reykjavík	A	Iceland	4–0	1982 FIFA World Cup Qualification	Ian Walsh (2), David Giles, Brian Flynn	10,254
356	15 October 1980	Ninian Park, Cardiff	H	Turkey	4–0	1982 FIFA World Cup Qualification	Leighton James (2), Brian Flynn, Ian Walsh	11,770
357	19 November 1980	Ninian Park, Cardiff	H	Czechoslovakia	1–0	1982 FIFA World Cup Qualification	David Giles	20,175
358	24 February 1981	Tolka Park, Dublin	A	Republic of Ireland	3–1	Friendly	Paul Price, Terry Boyle, Terry Yorath	15,000
359	25 March 1981	Ankara 19 Mayıs Stadyumu, Ankara	A	Turkey	1–0	1982 FIFA World Cup Qualification	Carl Harris	35,000
360	16 May 1981	Vetch Field, Swansea	H	Scotland	2–0	1980–81 British Home Championship	Ian Walsh (2)	18,935
361	20 May 1981	Wembley Stadium, London	A	England	0–0	1980–81 British Home Championship		34,280
362	30 May 1981	Racecourse Ground, Wrexham	H	Soviet Union	0–0	1982 FIFA World Cup Qualification		29,366
363	9 September 1981	Stadion Evžena Rošického, Prague	A	Czechoslovakia	0–2	1982 FIFA World Cup Qualification		38,000
364	14 October 1981	Vetch Field, Swansea	H	Iceland	2–2	1982 FIFA World Cup Qualification	Robbie James, Alan Curtis	19,783
365	18 November 1981	Dinamo Stadium, Tbilisi	A	Soviet Union	0–3	1982 FIFA World Cup Qualification		80,000
366	24 March 1982	Estadio Luíz Casanova, Valencia	A	Spain	1–1	Friendly	Robbie James	15,000
367	27 April 1982	Ninian Park, Cardiff	H	England	0–1	1981–82 British Home Championship		25,000
368	24 May 1982	Hampden Park, Glasgow	A	Scotland	0–1	1981–82 British Home Championship		25,284
369	27 May 1982	Racecourse Ground, Wrexham	H	Northern Ireland	3–0	1981–82 British Home Championship	Alan Curtis, Ian Rush, Peter Nicholas	2,315
370	2 June 1982	Stadium Municipal, Toulouse	A	France	1–0	Friendly	Ian Rush	26,671
371	22 September 1982	Vetch Field, Swansea	H	Norway	1–0	UEFA Euro 1984 qualifying	Ian Rush	4,340
372	15 December 1982	Gradski Stadion, Titograd	A	Yugoslavia	4–4	UEFA Euro 1984 qualifying	Brian Flynn, Ian Rush, Joey Jones, Robbie James	15,000
373	23 February 1983	Wembley Stadium, London	A	England	1–2	1982–83 British Home Championship	Ian Rush	24,000
374	27 April 1983	Racecourse Ground, Wrexham	H	Bulgaria	1–0	UEFA Euro 1984 qualifying	Jeremy Charles	9,006
375	28 May 1983	Ninian Park, Cardiff	H	Scotland	0–2	1982–83 British Home Championship		14,100
376	31 May 1983	Windsor Park, Belfast	A	Northern Ireland	1–0	1982–83 British Home Championship	Gordon Davies	8,000
377	12 June 1983	Ninian Park, Cardiff	H	Brazil	1–1	Friendly	Brian Flynn	30,000
378	21 September 1983	Ullevaal Stadion, Oslo	A	Norway	0–0	UEFA Euro 1984 qualifying		17,575
379	12 October 1983	Racecourse Ground, Wrexham	H	Romania	5–0	Friendly	Ian Rush (2), Mickey Thomas, Robbie James, Alan Curtis	4,161
380	16 November 1983	Vasil Levski National Stadium, Sofia	A	Bulgaria	0–1	UEFA Euro 1984 qualifying		8,000
381	14 December 1983	Ninian Park, Cardiff	H	Yugoslavia	1–1	UEFA Euro 1984 qualifying	Robbie James	24,000
382	28 February 1984	Hampden Park, Glasgow	A	Scotland	1–2	1983–84 British Home Championship	Robbie James	21,542
383	2 May 1984	Racecourse Ground, Wrexham	H	England	1–0	1983–84 British Home Championship	Mark Hughes	14,250
384	22 May 1984	Vetch Field, Swansea	A	Northern Ireland	1–1	1983–84 British Home Championship	Mark Hughes	7,845
385	6 June 1984	Lerkendal Stadion, Trondheim	A	Norway	0–1	Friendly		15,970
386	10 June 1984	Ramat Gan Stadium, Ramat Gan	A	Israel	0–0	Friendly		3,000
387	12 September 1984	Laugardalsvöllur, Reykjavík	A	Iceland	0–1	1986 FIFA World Cup Qualification		10,837
387	17 October 1984	Estadio Ramón Sánchez Pizjuán, Seville	A	Spain	0–3	1986 FIFA World Cup Qualification		42,500
388	14 November 1984	Ninian Park, Cardiff	H	Iceland	2–1	1986 FIFA World Cup Qualification	Mickey Thomas, Mark Hughes	10,504
389	26 February 1985	Racecourse Ground, Wrexham	H	Norway	1–1	Friendly	Ian Rush	4,532
390	27 March 1985	Hampden Park, Glasgow	A	Scotland	1–0	1986 FIFA World Cup Qualification	Ian Rush	62,424
391	30 April 1985	Racecourse Ground, Wrexham	H	Spain	3–0	1986 FIFA World Cup Qualification	Ian Rush (2), Mark Hughes	23,494
392	5 June 1985	Brann Stadion, Bergen	A	Norway	2–4	Friendly	Steve Lovell, Mark Hughes	5,596
393	10 September 1985	Ninian Park, Cardiff	H	Scotland	1–1	1986 FIFA World Cup Qualification	Mark Hughes	39,500
394	16 October 1985	Ninian Park, Cardiff	H	Hungary	0–3	Friendly		3,505
395	25 February 1986	Jalawi Stadium, Khobar	A	Saudi Arabia	2–1	Friendly	Neil Slatter, Gordon Davies	20,000
396	26 March 1986	Lansdowne Road, Dublin	A	Republic of Ireland	1–0	Friendly	Ian Rush	16,500
397	21 April 1986	Racecourse Ground, Wrexham	H	Uruguay	0–0	Friendly		11,154
398	10 May 1986	North York Civic Stadium, Toronto	A	Canada	0–2	Friendly		13,142
399	19 May 1986	Empire Stadium, Vancouver	A	Canada	3–0	Friendly	Dean Saunders (2), Malcolm Allen	9,007
400	10 September 1986	Olympic Stadium, Helsinki	A	Finland	1–1	UEFA Euro 1988 qualifying	Neil Slatter	9,840
401	18 February 1987	Vetch Field, Swansea	H	Soviet Union	0–0	Friendly		17,617
402	1 April 1987	Racecourse Ground, Wrexham	H	Finland	4–0	UEFA Euro 1988 qualifying	Ian Rush, Glyn Hodges, David Phillips, Andy Jones	7,696
403	29 April 1987	Racecourse Ground, Wrexham	H	Czechoslovakia	1–1	UEFA Euro 1988 qualifying	Ian Rush	14,150
404	9 September 1987	Ninian Park, Cardiff	H	Denmark	1–0	UEFA Euro 1988 qualifying	Mark Hughes	20,535
405	14 October 1987	Idrætsparken, Copenhagen	A	Denmark	0–1	UEFA Euro 1988 qualifying		44,500
406	11 November 1987	Letna Stadium, Prague	A	Czechoslovakia	0–2	UEFA Euro 1988 qualifying		6,443
407	23 March 1988	Vetch Field, Swansea	H	Yugoslavia	1–2	Friendly	Dean Saunders	5,985
408	27 April 1988	Råsunda Stadium, Stockholm	A	Sweden	1–4	Friendly	Glyn Hodges	11,656
409	1 June 1988	National Stadium, Valletta	A	Malta	3–2	Friendly	Barry Horne, Mark Hughes, Ian Rush	4,836
410	4 June 1988	Stadio Mario Rigamonti, Brescia	A	Italy	1–0	Friendly	Ian Rush	18,931
411	14 September 1988	Olympic Stadium, Amsterdam	A	Netherlands	0–1	1990 FIFA World Cup Qualification		58,000
412	19 October 1988	Vetch Field, Swansea	H	Finland	2–2	1990 FIFA World Cup Qualification	Dean Saunders, Aki Lahtinen (o.g.)	9,603
413	8 February 1989	Ramat Gan Stadium, Ramat Gan	A	Israel	3–3	Friendly	Barry Horne, Eitan Aharoni (o.g.), Malcolm Allen	6,000
414	26 April 1989	Racecourse Ground, Wrexham	H	Sweden	0–2	Friendly		7,292
415	31 May 1989	Cardiff Arms Park, Cardiff	H	West Germany	0–0	1990 FIFA World Cup Qualification		30,000
416	6 September 1989	Olympic Stadium, Helsinki	A	Finland	0–1	1990 FIFA World Cup Qualification		7,480
417	11 October 1989	Racecourse Ground, Wrexham	H	Netherlands	1–2	1990 FIFA World Cup Qualification	Mark Bowen	9,025
418	15 November 1989	Müngersdorfer Stadion, Cologne	A	West Germany	1–2	1990 FIFA World Cup Qualification	Malcolm Allen	60,300
419	28 March 1990	Lansdowne Road, Dublin	A	Republic of Ireland	0–1	Friendly		41,350
420	25 April 1990	Råsunda Stadium, Stockholm	A	Sweden	2–4	Friendly	Dean Saunders (2)	13,981
421	20 May 1990	Ninian Park, Cardiff	H	Costa Rica	1–0	Friendly	Dean Saunders	5,977
422	11 September 1990	Idrætsparken, Copenhagen	A	Denmark	0–1	Friendly		8,700
423	17 October 1990	National Stadium, Cardiff	H	Belgium	3–1	UEFA Euro 1992 qualifying	Ian Rush, Dean Saunders, Mark Hughes	14,274
424	14 November 1990	Stade Municipal, Luxembourg	A	Luxembourg	1–0	UEFA Euro 1992 qualifying	Ian Rush	6,703
425	6 February 1991	Racecourse Ground, Wrexham	H	Republic of Ireland	0–3	Friendly		9,168
426	27 March 1991	Vanden Stock Stadium, Anderlecht	A	Belgium	1–1	UEFA Euro 1992 qualifying	Dean Saunders	18,591
427	1 May 1991	National Stadium, Cardiff	H	Iceland	1–0	Friendly	Paul Bodin	3,656
428	29 May 1991	Radomiak Stadium, Radom	A	Poland	0–0	Friendly		12,000
429	5 June 1991	National Stadium, Cardiff	H	Germany	1–0	UEFA Euro 1992 qualifying	Ian Rush	34,603
430	11 September 1991	National Stadium, Cardiff	H	Brazil	1–0	Friendly	Dean Saunders	20,000
431	16 October 1991	Frankenstadion, Nuremberg	A	Germany	1–4	UEFA Euro 1992 qualifying	Paul Bodin	46,491
432	13 November 1991	National Stadium, Cardiff	H	Luxembourg	1–0	UEFA Euro 1992 qualifying	Paul Bodin	19,813
433	19 February 1992	Royal Dublin Society Stadium, Dublin	A	Republic of Ireland	1–0	Friendly	Mark Pembridge	15,100
434	29 April 1992	Ernst-Happel-Stadion, Vienna	A	Austria	1–1	Friendly	Chris Coleman	52,000
435	20 May 1992	Ghencea, Bucharest	A	Romania	1–5	1994 FIFA World Cup Qualification	Ian Rush	23,000
436	30 May 1992	Nieuw Galgenwaard, Utrecht	A	Netherlands	0–4	Friendly		18,009
437	3 June 1992	Nagaragawa Stadium, Gifu	N	Argentina	0–1	1992 Kirin Cup		31,000
438	7 June 1992	Ningineer Stadium, Matsuyama	A	Japan	1–0	1992 Kirin Cup		30,000
439	9 September 1992	National Stadium, Cardiff	H	Faroe Islands	6–0	1994 FIFA World Cup Qualification	Ian Rush (3), Dean Saunders, Mark Bowen, Clayton Blackmore	7,000
440	14 October 1992	Tsirion Stadium, Limassol	A	Cyprus	1–0	1994 FIFA World Cup Qualification	Mark Hughes	12,000
441	18 November 1992	Vanden Stock Stadium, Anderlecht	A	Belgium	0–2	1994 FIFA World Cup Qualification		21,000
442	17 February 1993	Tolka Park, Dublin	A	Republic of Ireland	1–2	Friendly	Mark Hughes	9,500
443	31 March 1993	National Stadium, Cardiff	H	Belgium	2–0	1994 FIFA World Cup Qualification	Ryan Giggs, Ian Rush	27,002
444	28 April 1993	Bazaly, Ostrava	A	Representation of Czechs and Slovaks	1–1	1994 FIFA World Cup Qualification	Mark Hughes	7,000
445	6 June 1993	Svangaskard, Toftir	A	Faroe Islands	3–0	1994 FIFA World Cup Qualification	Dean Saunders, Eric Young, Ian Rush	4,209
446	8 September 1993	National Stadium, Cardiff	H	Representation of Czechs and Slovaks	2–2	1994 FIFA World Cup Qualification	Ryan Giggs, Ian Rush	37,558
447	13 October 1993	National Stadium, Cardiff	H	Cyprus	2–0	1994 FIFA World Cup Qualification	Dean Saunders, Ian Rush	12,000
448	17 November 1993	National Stadium, Cardiff	H	Romania	1–2	1994 FIFA World Cup Qualification	Dean Saunders	40,000
449	9 March 1994	Ninian Park, Cardiff	H	Norway	1–3	Friendly	Chris Coleman	10,000
450	20 April 1994	Racecourse Ground, Wrexham	H	Sweden	0–2	Friendly		4,694
451	25 May 1994	Kadrioru Stadium, Tallinn	A	Estonia	2–1	Friendly	Ian Rush, David Phillips	1,500
452	7 September 1994	National Stadium, Cardiff	H	Albania	2–0	UEFA Euro 1996 qualifying	Chris Coleman, Ryan Giggs	15,791
453	12 October 1994	Stadionul Republican, Chişinău	A	Moldova	2–3	UEFA Euro 1996 qualifying	Gary Speed, Nathan Blake	12,000
454	16 November 1994	Boris Paichadze Stadium, Tbilisi	A	Georgia	0–5	UEFA Euro 1996 qualifying		45,000
455	14 December 1994	National Stadium, Cardiff	H	Bulgaria	0–3	UEFA Euro 1996 qualifying		23,206
456	29 March 1995	Vasil Levski National Stadium, Sofia	A	Bulgaria	1–3	UEFA Euro 1996 qualifying	Dean Saunders	60,000
457	26 April 1995	Rheinstadion, Düsseldorf	A	Germany	1–1	UEFA Euro 1996 qualifying	Dean Saunders	15,791
458	7 June 1995	National Stadium, Cardiff	H	Georgia	0–1	UEFA Euro 1996 qualifying		8,241
459	6 September 1995	National Stadium, Cardiff	H	Moldova	1–0	UEFA Euro 1996 qualifying	Gary Speed	6,271
460	11 October 1995	National Stadium, Cardiff	H	Germany	1–2	UEFA Euro 1996 qualifying	Kit Symons	27,000
461	15 November 1995	Qemal Stafa Stadium, Tirana	A	Albania	1–1	UEFA Euro 1996 qualifying	Mark Pembridge	2,100
462	24 January 1996	Stadio Libero Liberati, Terni	A	Italy	0–3	Friendly		16,095
463	24 April 1996	Stadio Cornaredo, Lugano	A	Switzerland	0–2	Friendly		8,500
464	2 June 1996	Stadio Olimpico, Serravalle	A	San Marino	5–0	1998 FIFA World Cup Qualification	Mark Hughes (2), Andy Melville, Ryan Giggs, Mark Pembridge	1,613
465	31 August 1996	National Stadium, Cardiff	H	San Marino	6–0	1998 FIFA World Cup Qualification	Dean Saunders (2), Mark Hughes (2), Andy Melville, John Robinson	15,150
466	5 October 1996	National Stadium, Cardiff	H	Netherlands	1–3	1998 FIFA World Cup Qualification	Dean Saunders	34,560
467	9 November 1996	Philips Stadion, Eindhoven	A	Netherlands	1–7	1998 FIFA World Cup Qualification	Dean Saunders	26,210
468	14 December 1996	National Stadium, Cardiff	H	Turkey	0–0	1998 FIFA World Cup Qualification		12,500
469	11 February 1997	Ninian Park, Cardiff	H	Republic of Ireland	0–0	Friendly		7,000
470	29 March 1997	Ninian Park, Cardiff	H	Belgium	1–2	1998 FIFA World Cup Qualification	Gary Speed	14,650
471	27 May 1997	Rugby Park, Kilmarnock	A	Scotland	1–0	Friendly	John Hartson	9,013
472	20 August 1997	Ali Sami Yen Stadium, Istanbul	A	Turkey	4–6	1998 FIFA World Cup Qualification	Nathan Blake, Robbie Savage, Dean Saunders, Andy Melville	9,710
473	11 October 1997	Roi Baudouin, Bruxelles	A	Belgium	2–3	1998 FIFA World Cup Qualification	Mark Pembridge, Ryan Giggs	19,233
474	11 November 1997	Estádio Mané Garrincha, Brasilia	A	Brazil	0–3	Friendly		30,000
475	25 March 1998	Ninian Park, Cardiff	H	Jamaica	0–0	Friendly		13,349
476	4 June 1998	National Stadium, Valletta	H	Malta	3–0	Friendly	Craig Bellamy, John Hartson, Mark Pembridge	2,500
477	6 June 1998	Stade El Menzah, Tunis	A	Tunisia	0–4	Friendly		80,000
478	5 September 1998	Anfield, Liverpool (Note: The Football Association of Wales chose to host the match at Anfield in order to maximise potential revenue due to limited seating capacity at Welsh grounds.)	N	Italy	0–2	UEFA Euro 2000 qualifying		23,160
479	10 October 1998	Parken, København	A	Denmark	2–1	UEFA Euro 2000 qualifying	Ady Williams, Craig Bellamy	36,009
480	14 October 1998	Ninian Park, Cardiff	H	Belarus	3–2	UEFA Euro 2000 qualifying	John Robinson, Chris Coleman, Kit Symons	11,975
481	31 March 1999	Letzigrund Stadion, Zürich	A	Switzerland	0–2	UEFA Euro 2000 qualifying		13,500
482	5 June 1999	Stadio DallAra, Bologna	A	Italy	0–4	UEFA Euro 2000 qualifying		12,392
483	9 June 1999	Anfield, Liverpool (Note: Wales were forced to play the match at Anfield by UEFA after Denmark demanded the same provisions as the Italy match on 5 September 1998.)	N	Denmark	0–2	UEFA Euro 2000 qualifying		10,956
484	4 September 1999	Dinamo, Minsk	A	Belarus	2–1	UEFA Euro 2000 qualifying	Dean Saunders, Ryan Giggs	25,000
485	9 October 1999	Racecourse Ground, Wrexham	H	Switzerland	0–2	UEFA Euro 2000 qualifying		5,064

== Head to head records ==
Head to head records
Opponent	P	W	D	L	GF	GA	W%	D%	L%
Albania	2	1	1	0	3	1	50	50	0
Argentina	1	0	0	1	0	1	0	0	100
Austria	1	0	1	0	1	1	0	100	0
Belarus	2	2	0	0	5	3	100	0	0
Belgium	6	2	1	3	9	9	33	17	50
Brazil	3	1	1	1	2	4	33	33	33
Bulgaria	4	1	0	3	2	7	25	0	75
Canada	2	1	0	1	3	2	50	0	50
Costa Rica	1	1	0	0	1	0	100	0	0
Cyprus	2	2	0	0	3	0	100	0	0
Czechoslovakia	6	1	3	2	5	7	17	50	33
Denmark	5	2	0	3	3	5	40	0	60
England	5	2	1	2	6	4	40	20	40
Estonia	1	1	0	0	2	1	100	0	0
Faroe Islands	2	2	0	0	9	0	100	0	0
Finland	4	1	2	1	7	4	25	50	25
France	1	1	0	0	1	0	100	0	0
Georgia	2	0	0	2	0	6	0	0	100
Germany	4	1	1	2	4	7	25	25	50
Hungary	1	0	0	1	0	3	0	0	100
Iceland	4	3	1	1	8	4	75	25	25
Israel	2	0	2	0	4	4	0	100	0
Italy	4	1	0	3	1	9	25	0	75
Jamaica	1	0	1	0	0	0	0	100	0
Japan	1	1	0	0	1	0	100	0	0
Luxembourg	2	2	0	0	2	0	100	0	0
Malta	2	2	0	0	6	2	100	0	0
Moldova	2	1	0	1	3	3	50	0	50
Netherlands	5	0	0	5	3	17	0	0	100
Northern Ireland	4	2	1	1	5	2	50	25	25
Norway	6	1	2	3	5	9	17	33	50
Poland	1	0	1	0	0	0	0	100	0
Republic of Ireland	7	3	1	3	6	7	43	14	43
Romania	2	0	0	2	2	7	0	0	100
San Marino	2	2	0	0	11	0	100	0	0
Saudi Arabia	1	1	0	0	2	1	100	0	0
Scotland	8	3	1	4	6	6	38	13	50
Soviet Union	3	0	2	1	0	3	0	67	33
Spain	3	1	1	1	4	4	33	33	33
Sweden	4	0	0	4	3	12	0	0	100
Switzerland	3	0	0	3	0	6	0	0	0
Tunisia	1	0	0	1	0	4	0	0	100
Turkey	4	2	1	1	9	6	50	25	25
Uruguay	1	0	1	0	0	0	0	100	0
West Germany	2	0	1	1	1	2	0	50	50
Yugoslavia	3	0	2	1	6	7	0	67	33
Totals	133	47	28	58	154	180	35	85	44
