= 1982 FIFA World Cup qualification – UEFA Group 3 =

Football tournament qualification stage

Group 3 consisted of five of the 34 teams entered into the European zone: Czechoslovakia, Iceland, Soviet Union, Turkey, and Wales. These five teams competed on a home-and-away basis for two of the 14 spots in the final tournament allocated to the European zone, with the group's winner and runner-up claiming those spots.

== Standings ==
Rank	Team	Pts	Pld	W	D	L	GF	GA	GD
1	Soviet Union	14	8	6	2	0	20	2	+18
2	Czechoslovakia	10	8	4	2	2	15	6	+9
3	Wales	10	8	4	2	2	12	7	+5
4	Iceland	6	8	2	2	4	10	21	−11
5	Turkey	0	8	0	0	8	1	22	−21

=== Results ===
2 June 1980

Iceland	0 – 4	Wales
	Report	Walsh 45', 75'; Giles 53'; Flynn 61' (pen.)

Laugardalsvöllur, Reykjavík
Attendance: 10,254
Referee: Rolf Nyhus (Norway)

3 September 1980

Iceland	1 – 2	Soviet Union
Sveinsson 75'	Report	Gavrilov 35'; Andreyev 80'

Laugardalsvöllur, Reykjavík
Attendance: 4,190
Referee: Oliver Donnelly (Northern Ireland)

24 September 1980

Turkey	1 – 3	Iceland
Fatih 72' (pen.)	Report	Guðlaugsson 12'; A. Guðmundsson 62'; T. Þórðarson 80'

İzmir Atatürk Stadyumu, İzmir
Attendance: 18,506
Referee: Ioan Igna (Romania)

15 October 1980

Soviet Union	5 – 0	Iceland
Andreyev 9', 78'; Oganesian 39', 58'; Bezsonov 84'	Report

Central Lenin Stadium, Moscow
Attendance: 21,000
Referee: Aleksander Suchanek (Poland)
15 October 1980

Wales	4 – 0	Turkey
Flynn 19'; L. James 37' (pen.), 85'; Walsh 79'	Report

Ninian Park, Cardiff
Attendance: 11,770
Referee: Torben Månsson (Denmark)

19 November 1980

Wales	1 – 0	Czechoslovakia
Giles 10'	Report

Ninian Park, Cardiff
Attendance: 20,175
Referee: Walter Eschweiler (West Germany)

3 December 1980

Czechoslovakia	2 – 0	Turkey
Nehoda 13', 15'	Report

Stadion Evžena Rošického, Prague
Attendance: 8,500
Referee: Erik Fredriksson (Sweden)

25 March 1981

Turkey	0 – 1	Wales
	Report	Harris 67'

Ankara 19 Mayıs Stadyumu, Ankara
Attendance: 35,000
Referee: Sándor Kúti (Hungary)

15 April 1981

Turkey	0 – 3	Czechoslovakia
	Report	Janečka 58'; Kozák 70'; Vízek 81'

Ali Sami Yen Stadı, Istanbul
Attendance: 35,000
Referee: Roger Schoeters (Belgium)

27 May 1981

Czechoslovakia	6 – 1	Iceland
Vízek 35'; Panenka 44' (pen.); Nehoda 72'; Bjarnason 78' (o.g.); Kozák 79'; Janečka 87'	Report	Bergs 60'

Tehelné pole, Bratislava
Attendance: 21,756
Referee: Nikos Zlatanos (Greece)

30 May 1981

Wales	0 – 0	Soviet Union
	Report

Racecourse Ground, Wrexham
Attendance: 29,366
Referee: Bruno Galler (Switzerland)

9 September 1981

Iceland	2 – 0	Turkey
L. Guðmundsson 21'; A. Eðvaldsson 65'	Report

Laugardalsvöllur, Reykjavík
Attendance: 4,292
Referee: Kevin O'Sullivan (Republic of Ireland)
9 September 1981

Czechoslovakia	2 – 0	Wales
D. Davies 24' (o.g.); Lička 67'	Report

Stadion Evžena Rošického, Prague
Attendance: 38,000
Referee: Franz Wöhrer (Austria)

23 September 1981

Soviet Union	4 – 0	Turkey
Chivadze 4'; Demianenko 20'; Blokhin 26'; Shengelia 49'	Report

Central Lenin Stadium, Moscow
Attendance: 41,500
Referee: Damir Matovinović (Yugoslavia)
23 September 1981

Iceland	1 – 1	Czechoslovakia
Ormslev 6'	Report	Kozák 77'

Laugardalsvöllur, Reykjavík
Attendance: 7,343
Referee: Kenneth Hope (Scotland)

7 October 1981

Turkey	0 – 3	Soviet Union
	Report	Shengelia 17'; Blokhin 38', 54'

İzmir Atatürk Stadyumu, İzmir
Attendance: 62,125
Referee: Walter Eschweiler (West Germany)

14 October 1981

Wales	2 – 2	Iceland
R. James 25'; Curtis 54'	Report	Á. Sigurvinsson 47', 61'

Vetch Field, Swansea
Attendance: 19,783
Referee: Arto Ravander (Finland)

28 October 1981

Soviet Union	2 – 0	Czechoslovakia
Shengelia 28', 46'	Report

Dinamo Stadium, Tbilisi
Attendance: 75,000
Referee: Michel Vautrot (France)

18 November 1981

Soviet Union	3 – 0	Wales
Daraselia 13'; Blokhin 18'; Gavrilov 64'	Report

Dinamo Stadium, Tbilisi
Attendance: 75,000
Referee: Jan Keizer (Netherlands)

29 November 1981

Czechoslovakia	1 – 1	Soviet Union
Vojaček 34'	Report	Blokhin 14'

Tehelné pole, Bratislava
Attendance: 47,000
Referee: Clive White (England)
