= 1979–80 British Home Championship =

Tournament details
- Dates: 16–24 May 1980
- Teams: 4

Final positions
- Champions: Northern Ireland (7th title)
- Runners-up: England

Tournament statistics
- Matches played: 6
- Goals scored: 12 (2 per match)
- Top scorer: 10 players (1 goal each)

The 1979–80 British Home Championship saw only the second undisputed victory for Northern Ireland in the British Home Nations international football tournament in 96 years of its existence. It was the first time since 1970 that Scotland agreed to travel to Northern Ireland, having refused to play there since 1972.

The opening matches provided two great shocks for the long-established favourites of England and Scotland, with a narrow Northern Irish home victory over the Scots and a Welsh 4–1 thrashing of the English, putting the underdogs in pole position going into their remaining rounds. Scotland recovered slightly with a narrow victory over the Welsh, but England could only manage a draw with the Northern Irish, who were in the best position to claim undisputed first place for 66 years. In the final matches, England salvaged pride and points with a win over the Scots taking them to second place, but the Northern Irish claimed the trophy by defeating Wales in Cardiff, celebrating their centenary with a rare triumph.

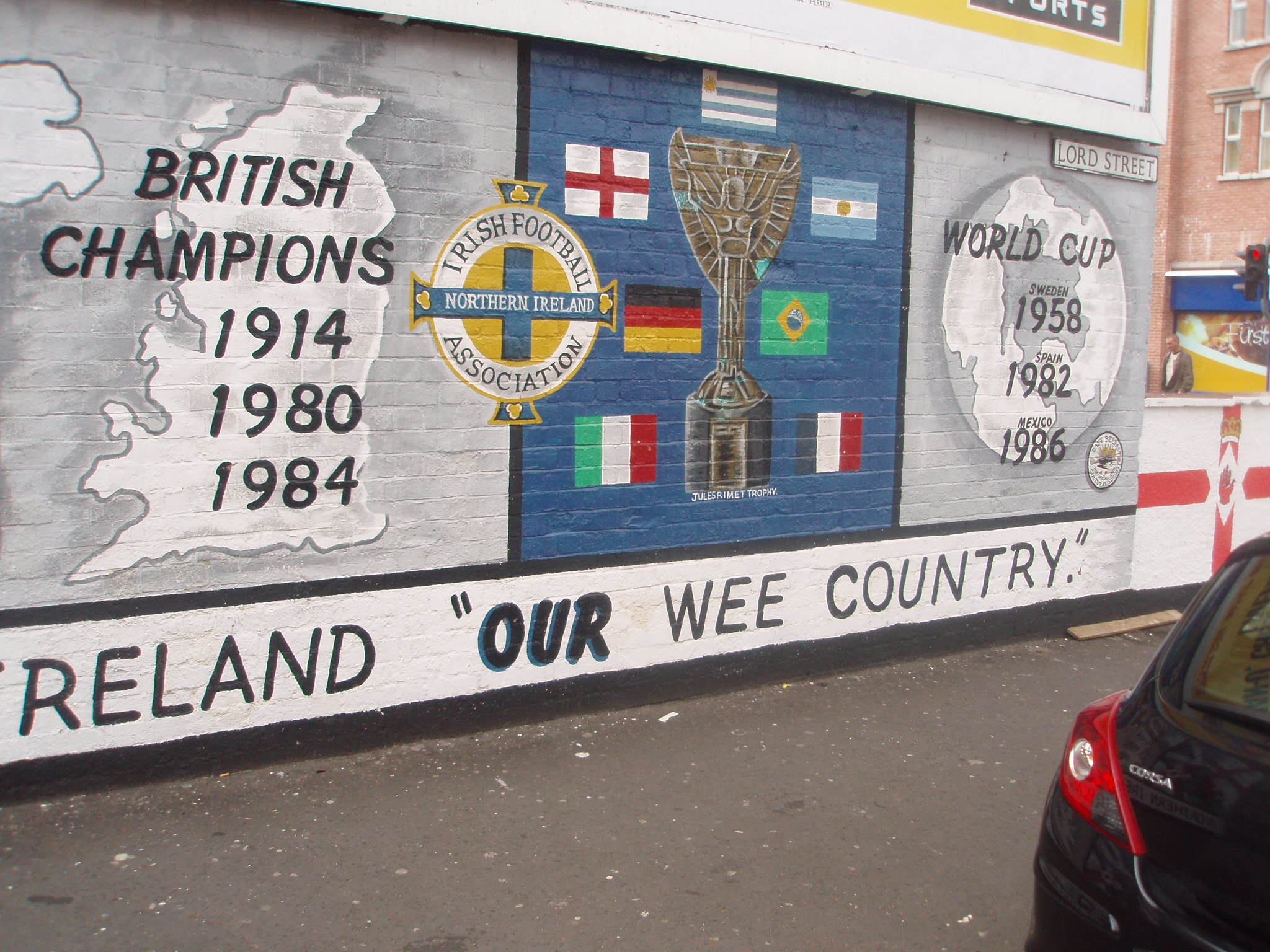
Mural in Belfast celebrating the three outright wins of the British Home Championship by Ireland and Northern Ireland, including in 1980.

== Table ==
Team	Pld	W	D	L	GF	GA	GD	Pts
Northern Ireland (C)	3	2	1	0	3	1	+2	5
England	3	1	1	1	4	5	−1	3
Wales	3	1	0	2	4	3	+1	2
Scotland	3	1	0	2	1	3	−2	2

Rules for classification: 1) points 2) goal difference. The points system worked as follows: 2 points for a win and 1 point for a draw.
(C) Champions

== Results ==
16 May 1980

Northern Ireland	1–0	Scotland
Hamilton 36'	Report

Windsor Park, Belfast
Referee: Clive Thomas (Wales)

17 May 1980

Wales	4–1	England
Thomas 19'; Walsh 30'; James 60'; Thompson 66' (o.g.)		Mariner 16'

Racecourse Ground, Wrexham
Referee: Ian Foote (Scotland)

20 May 1980

England	1–1	Northern Ireland
Brotherston 81' (o.g.)		Cochrane 83'

Wembley Stadium, London
Referee: Gwyn Owen (Wales)

21 May 1980

Scotland	1–0	Wales
Miller 26'

Hampden Park, Glasgow
Referee: Hugh Wilson (Northern Ireland)

23 May 1980

Wales	0–1	Northern Ireland
		Brotherston 22'

Ninian Park, Cardiff
Referee: John Hunting (England)

24 May 1980

Scotland	0–2	England
		Brooking 8'; Coppell 75'

Hampden Park, Glasgow
Referee: António Garrido (Portugal)
