= Kelvin Clarke =

English footballer

Personal information
- Full name: Kelvin Leslie Clarke
- Date of birth: 16 July 1957 (age 69)
- Place of birth: Willenhall, England
- Position: Defender

Youth career
- Walsall

Senior career*
Years	Team	Apps	(Gls)
1975–1978	Walsall	9	(0)
- * Club domestic league appearances and goals

Kelvin Leslie Clarke (born 16 July 1957) is an English former footballer who played in the Football League as a defender for Walsall. Clarke was born in Willenhall, the fourth of five brothers (Frank, Allan, Derek and Wayne) who all went on to play League football. He was signed by Walsall as an apprentice, and turned professional in July 1975. He made nine league appearances, without scoring, before an ankle injury forced his retirement in 1978.
