= Rolf Nyhus =

Norwegian sports administrator (1942–2026)

Rolf Nyhus (9 July 1942 – 12 October 2026) was a Norwegian sports administrator and football referee.

== Life and career ==
Nyhus was a FIFA referee from 1969 to 1985, refereeing two matches in the 1974 and 1982 World Cup qualifying as well as matches in the 1972, 1976 and 1980 European Championship qualifying In club football, he officiated UEFA competition matches such as Champions League (5), Cup Winners Cup (6) and UEFA Cup (10). He was the referee of 1971 Norwegian Football Cup Final between Rosenborg and Fredrikstad, and himself represented the club Nordstrand IF.

He worked as a sales director in Bama and was secretary-general in the Association for the Promotion of Skiing. As such, he administered the Holmenkollen ski festival, the 1982 FIS Nordic World Ski Championships, the 1986 Biathlon World Championships and the 1987 Winter Deaflympics and worked with the bid for the 2011 FIS Nordic World Ski Championships. His nickname was "the Kollen general". He received the Medal of St. Hallvard and became a member of the gentlemen's skiing club SK Ull.

Nyhus died on 12 October 2026, at the age of 84.

== Honours and decorations ==
- – King's Medal of Merit in Gold (2003)
- – Medal of St. Hallvard (2000)
