= Allan Clarke (footballer) =

English footballer

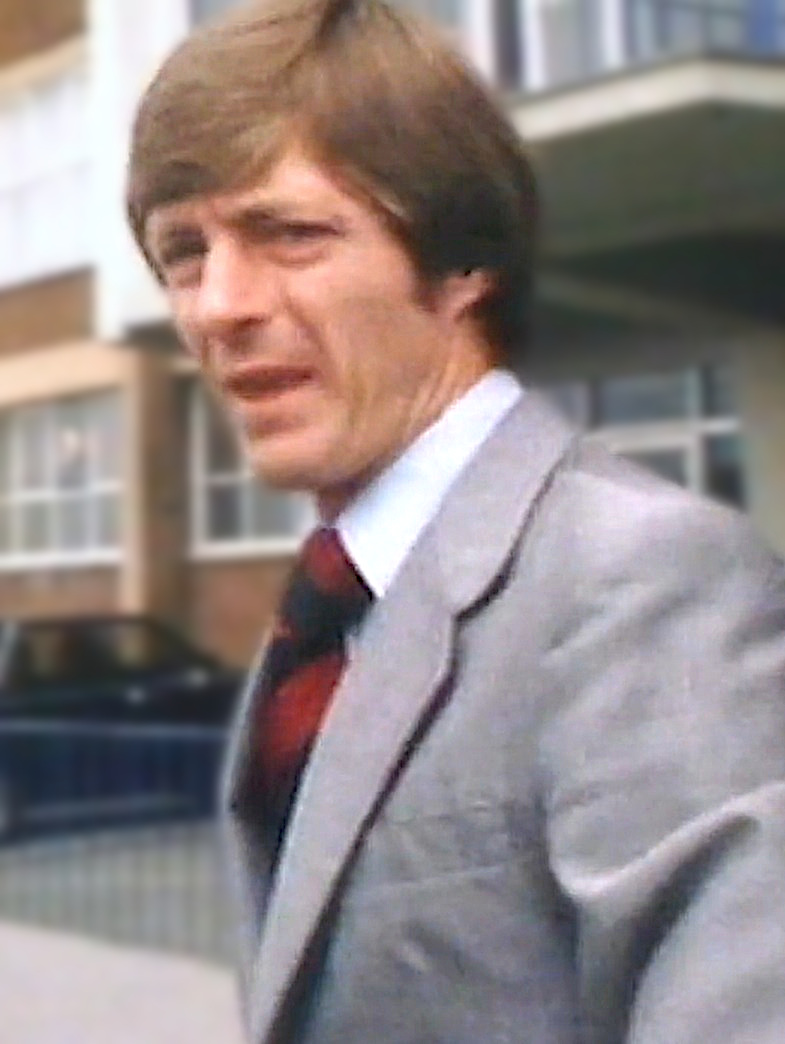
- Clarke in 1980

Personal information
- Full name: Allan John Clarke
- Date of birth: 31 July 1946 (age 80)
- Place of birth: Short Heath, Willenhall, Staffordshire, England
- Height: 6 ft 0 in (1.83 m)
- Positions: Striker; inside forward

Senior career*
Years	Team	Apps	(Gls)
1963–1966	Walsall	72	(41)
1966–1968	Fulham	86	(45)
1968–1969	Leicester City	36	(12)
1969–1978	Leeds United	273	(110)
1978–1980	Barnsley	47	(15)
Total		514	(223)

International career
1970–1975	England	19	(10)

Managerial career
- 1978–1980: Barnsley
- 1980–1982: Leeds United
- 1983–1984: Scunthorpe United
- 1985–1989: Barnsley
- 1990: Lincoln City
- * Club domestic league appearances and goals

Allan John Clarke (born 31 July 1946), nicknamed "Sniffer", is an English former professional footballer who played in the Football League for Walsall, Fulham, Leicester City, Leeds United and Barnsley, and won 19 international caps for England.

== Career ==
=== Early career ===
Clarke was born in Short Heath, Willenhall, Staffordshire. He is the third of seven children. Clarke joined Walsall in 1961 as an apprentice, playing his debut for the Saddlers in October 1963, against Reading. Whilst at the club he scored 46 goals in 82 appearances. He was transferred to Fulham in March 1966 for a fee of £35,000. Such was his early promise that Leicester City paid £150,000 for Clarke in 1968, a then British football transfer fee record. Frank Large moved to Fulham from Leicester as part of the deal. Clarke spent just one season at Leicester City, in which he scored the winning goal in the semi-final of the 1969 FA Cup, knocking out the team he had supported as a boy – West Bromwich Albion. He also played in the FA Cup final and was man of the match, despite Leicester City losing 1–0 to Manchester City.

=== Leeds United ===
On 24 June 1969, Leeds United manager Don Revie paid £165,000 to Leicester City for Clarke's services. For the second time, Clarke had topped the British football transfer fee record.

Clarke scored 26 goals in his first season at Leeds and earned the nickname "Sniffer", because of his predatory instincts of "sniffing out" scoring opportunities. Leeds United chased a dream "treble" of League championship, FA Cup and European Cup though ultimately they won nothing. Clarke hit the post in the FA Cup Final at Wembley (with strike partner Mick Jones following up to score the rebound) and then went on a run through several Chelsea defenders in the replay to set up a goal for Jones again, but Leeds United still lost. The title had already gone to Everton who had clinched the trophy several weeks before the end of the season, and the European Cup campaign ended with defeat to Celtic in the semi-final (0–1 at Elland Road and 1–2 at Hampden Park).

Clarke was in the Leeds United side that won its second Fairs Cup in 1971, scoring in the final against Juventus. Leeds United reached the FA Cup Final again in the competition's centenary year, and at Wembley they faced the Cup holders, Arsenal. Clarke scored the only goal of the game with a diving header from a Jones cross early in the second half. He had hit the crossbar with another diving header earlier in the game. Unfortunately for Clarke and Leeds, they lost the League title and the chance of emulating Arsenal's previous season "double" when they lost to Wolverhampton Wanderers two days after winning the FA Cup.

Clarke played again at Wembley – and lost – when Leeds United were beaten 1–0 by Sunderland in the 1973 FA Cup Final. Clarke was again Leeds United's top scorer as Leeds United won the league title in 1974, including a run of 29 opening matches without defeat. Leeds United lost the 1975 European Cup Final to Bayern Munich 2–0 and were denied a clear penalty when Clarke was tackled from behind and felled by Franz Beckenbauer in the penalty area.

After this match the Revie side began to break up; their manager had left in 1974 to take the England job, and Clarke himself left the club in 1978 after 351 appearances and 151 goals, with a knee injury curtailing his ability to play at top-flight level. He scored in the 1977 FA Cup semi-final, but the game ended in a 2–1 win by Manchester United.

== International career ==
Clarke was called up for England's 1970 World Cup squad in Mexico, despite being uncapped. He made his debut for his country against Czechoslovakia in the heat and pressure of a World Cup first-round match. Clarke scored the only goal of the match, from the penalty spot. He remains the most recent England player to make his international debut in a World Cup finals match. Over the next five years he appeared a total of 19 times for England, scoring ten goals.

In 1973, he was in the England team which needed to defeat Poland at Wembley to qualify for the 1974 World Cup. A goal down, England were awarded a penalty from which Clarke scored, but other than that, he was among many England players to be thwarted by the Polish goalkeeper Jan Tomaszewski. A 1–1 draw was not enough, and England did not go through to play in the 1974 World Cup.

== Managerial career ==
Clarke was appointed Barnsley player-manager on 1 June 1978, and under him they won promotion to the old third Division in May 1979, with Clarke scoring 12 goals himself that season including a hat-trick against Port Vale on Boxing Day. On 29 December 1979, Barnsley lost 7–0 at Reading, and Clarke decided to end his playing career. He was infuriated by the performance of his team and ordered his players to spend a day down a Yorkshire coal mine at Woolley Colliery to show them what they could have been doing for a living. Clarke then began to bring in new players such as Trevor Aylott and Derrick Parker and Ian Evans and Barnsley finished mid-table.

Clarke left Barnsley in September 1980 to manage Leeds United. Leeds finished 9th under Clarke at the end of his first season as manager, but the following season, they were beaten 5–1 at Swansea on the opening day, and only won once until October. Leeds were relegated and Clarke was dismissed on 25 June 1982. He then became manager at Scunthorpe United between February 1983, and 24 August 1984, He led Scunthorpe to promotion to the Third Division in May 1983, but a year later they were relegated, and both he and the chairman resigned.

Clarke had another spell at Barnsley between 1 July 1985 and 8 November 1989. Despite having no money to spend, low gates, and being forced to sell players such as David Hirst and John Beresford, Clarke led Barnsley to the fifth round of the FA Cup twice, when they were knocked out by Arsenal in 1987 and Everton in 1989. At the end of 1988–89 season, Barnsley finished just two points off securing a play-off place, losing only twice in the last 17 games. However, in the following season, after a bright start, a bad run saw Barnsley move, by 4 November, to fifth-from-bottom. Four days later Clarke was dismissed. He was Lincoln City caretaker manager for six months, being replaced by Steve Thompson on 30 November 1990.

== Life outside football ==
From 1993 until he reached retirement age, Clarke was a travelling salesman for MTS Nationwide, a firm based at Wakefield, West Yorkshire. He has, however, remained an outspoken critic of the game, and like many of the Leeds United players of the Don Revie era, has remained fiercely protective of the reputation of both the manager and the club. He has suffered from arthritic knees in recent years. Clarke now lives in Scunthorpe, Lincolnshire.

== The Clarke footballing brothers ==
Allan was the second of five brothers to play the professional game – four of whom played for Walsall across three decades. Frank was the only Clarke brother not to represent Walsall, playing for Shrewsbury Town, Queens Park Rangers, Ipswich Town and Carlisle United; Derek played for Walsall, Oxford United and Orient; Kelvin played for Walsall; and the youngest sibling, Wayne Clarke, played for Walsall towards the end of his career.

== Career statistics ==
Appearances and goals by club, season and competition"
Club	Season	League			FA Cup		League Cup		Europe		Total	
Club	Season	Division	Apps	Goals	Apps	Goals	Apps	Goals	Apps	Goals	Apps	Goals
Walsall	1963–64	Third Division	6	0	0	0	0	0	–		6	0
Walsall	1964–65	Third Division	43	23	0	0	0	0	–		43	23
Walsall	1965–66	Third Division	24	19	2	1	3	1	–		29	21
Walsall	Total		73	42	2	1	3	1	0	0	78	44
Fulham	1965–66	First Division	8	1	0	0	0	0			8	1
Fulham	1966–67	First Division	42	24	3	3	2	2			47	29
Fulham	1967–68	First Division	36	20	3	2	6	5			45	27
Fulham	Total		86	45	6	5	8	7	0	0	100	57
Leicester City	1968–69	First Division	36	12	8	1	2	3			46	16
Leeds United	1969–70	First Division	28	17	9	7	–		5	2	42	26
Leeds United	1970–71	First Division	41	19	4	1	1	0	10	3	56	23
Leeds United	1971–72	First Division	35	11	6	4	4	0	–		45	15
Leeds United	1972–73	First Division	36	18	8	6	4	0	5	2	53	26
Leeds United	1973–74	First Division	34	13	3	0	–		5	3	42	16
Leeds United	1974–75	First Division	34	14	7	3	3	1	8	4	52	22
Leeds United	1975–76	First Division	36	11	2	1	1	1	–		39	13
Leeds United	1976–77	First Division	20	4	5	3	1	0	–		26	7
Leeds United	1977–78	First Division	9	3	1	0	1	0	–		11	3
Leeds United	Total		273	110	45	25	15	2	33	14	366	151
Barnsley	1978–79	Fourth Division	34	12	3	2	2	0	–		39	14
Barnsley	1979–80	Third Division	13	3	2	1	3	0			18	4
Barnsley	Total		47	15	5	3	5	0	0	0	57	18
Career total			515	224	66	35	33	13	33	14	647	286

== Honours ==
Leicester City

- FA Cup runner-up: 1968–69

Leeds United

- Football League First Division: 1973–74
- FA Cup: 1971–72; runner-up: 1969–70, 1972–73
- FA Charity Shield: 1969
- Inter-Cities Fairs Cup: 1970–71
- European Cup runner-up: 1974–75

Individual

- PFA Team of the Year: 1973–74 First Division
