= Brian Attley =

Welsh footballer (born 1955)

Personal information
- Full name: Brian Robert Attley
- Date of birth: 23 August 1955 (age 71)
- Place of birth: Cardiff, Wales
- Positions: Defender; midfielder

Senior career*
| Years | Team | Apps | (Gls) |
| 1973–1979 | Cardiff City | 79 | (1) |
| 1979–1982 | Swansea City | 89 | (6) |
| 1982–1984 | Derby County | 55 | (1) |
| 1982–1983 | → Oxford United (loan) | 5 | (0) |
| 1984–1986 | Gresley Rovers | | |
| 1986–? | Stapenhill | | |
- * Club domestic league appearances and goals

Brian Robert Attley (born 23 August 1955) is a Welsh former professional footballer. Able to play in either defence or midfield, he made over 200 appearances in The Football League during his career.

== Early life ==
Attley was born in Cardiff and attended Fitzalan High School.

== Career ==
=== In Wales ===
Attley began his career at Cardiff City, where his uncle Len Attley had played in the 1930s, making his professional debut in March 1975 against Blackpool. He was involved in the club's 1975–76 promotion season, scoring his first professional goal against Port Vale, as well as their FA Cup run the following season. He joined Swansea City in February 1979 for £20,000 and played for them in the First Division. However, Attley was unable to hold down a starting place in the team at this higher level and fell out of favour. In February 1982 he left the club to join Derby County in a £25,000.

=== Derby County ===
He made his Derby debut against Leicester City on 6 February 1982 and altogether made 55 appearances for the Baseball Ground side. He also spent part of the 1982–83 season on loan at Oxford United.

=== Non-league ===
Attley left the Football League in the 1984 close season to sign for Gresley Rovers, having been convinced to sign by player-manager Roger Davies, and made his debut for the club in August against Oldswinford. He remained with the club until 1986 when he joined Stapenhill for a time, having been convinced to join the club by manager Mick Allsopp and an offer of a full-time job by one of the club's sponsors. Attley left the game following his retirement and settled in Rhoose where he works in floor tiling.
