= 1982–83 British Home Championship =

Tournament details
- Dates: 23 February – 1 June 1983
- Teams: 4

Final positions
- Champions: England (54th title)
- Runners-up: Scotland

Tournament statistics
- Matches played: 6
- Goals scored: 8 (1.33 per match)
- Top scorer: 8 players (1 each)

The 1982–83 British Home Championship was the penultimate in the series of football tournaments between the British Home Nations which stretched back 99 years to 1884. In 1983 England and then Scotland announced their withdrawal from future competition after the 1984 competition with the arrangement of the Rous Cup between the two nations to eliminate Wales and Northern Ireland, who were seen as weaker opposition. The 1983 tournament was a tight contest, which England won with a final victory at home over Scotland following an opening victory over Wales and a draw in Belfast. The game at Wembley was played in midweek in an attempt to curb the large number of travelling Scottish supporters. The Scots came second with a win over Wales and a draw with Northern Ireland off-setting their final day defeat. The Welsh succumbed to goal difference as the points system then in use meant that the Irish, who had drawn twice and lost once without scoring themselves gained the same number of points for a smaller goal difference despite Wales' victory over them in their final game.

== Table ==
Team	Pld	W	D	L	GF	GA	GD	Pts
England (C)	3	2	1	0	4	1	+3	5
Scotland	3	1	1	1	2	2	0	3
Northern Ireland	3	0	2	1	0	1	−1	2
Wales	3	1	0	2	2	4	−2	2

Rules for classification: 1) points 2) goal difference. The points system worked as follows: 2 points for a win and 1 point for a draw.
(C) Champions

== Results ==
23 February 1983

England	2–1	Wales
Butcher 39'; Neal 78' (pen.)		Rush 14'

Wembley Stadium, London
Referee: Bob Valentine (Scotland)

24 May 1983

Scotland	0–0	Northern Ireland

Hampden Park, Glasgow
Referee: Keith Hackett (England)

28 May 1983

Northern Ireland	0–0	England

Windsor Park, Belfast
Referee: Howard King (Wales)

28 May 1983

Wales	0–2	Scotland
		Gray 11'; Brazil 67'

Ninian Park, Cardiff
Referee: Malcolm Moffatt (Northern Ireland)

31 May 1983

Northern Ireland	0–1	Wales
		Davies 64'

Windsor Park, Belfast
Referee: Hugh Alexander (Scotland)

1 June 1983

England	2–0	Scotland
Robson 13'; Cowans 54'

Wembley Stadium, London
Referee: Erik Fredriksson (Sweden)

== Note ==
- Guy Oliver (1992). The Guinness Record of World Soccer. Guinness. ISBN 0-85112-954-4.
