= Frank Clarke (footballer) =

English footballer (1942–2022)

Personal information
- Full name: Frank James Clarke
- Date of birth: 15 July 1942
- Place of birth: Willenhall, Staffordshire, England
- Date of death: 2 June 2022 (aged 79)
- Position: Forward

Senior career*
Years	Team	Apps	(Gls)
- Willenhall Town
1961–1968	Shrewsbury Town	188	(77)
1968–1970	Queens Park Rangers	67	(17)
1970–1973	Ipswich Town	66	(15)
1973–1978	Carlisle United	126	(30)
Total		524	(139)
- * Club domestic league appearances and goals

Frank James Clarke (15 July 1942 – 2 June 2022) was an English footballer. Clarke was the eldest of five brothers who all played in the Football League.

== Career ==
After playing non-league football for Willenhall Town, he played in the Football League as a centre forward for Shrewsbury Town, Queens Park Rangers, Ipswich Town, and Carlisle United. He made his debut for Shrewsbury Town in 1962 and made 188 appearances for the club. His goal tally of 77 goals was joint-second on the club's all-time scorers list. He was inducted into Shrewsbury Town Hall of Fame.

His younger brothers Allan, Derek, Kelvin and Wayne all played in the Football League. Frank was the only one of the five who did not represent Walsall.

== Personal life ==
After his retirement from football, Clarke returned to Shrewsbury and worked as a newsagent, and at the Adams Sports Centre in Wem as a supervisor for 28 years, until 2010. He dedicated much of his time caring for his family and looking after his grandchildren.

Clarke died on 2 June 2022, surrounded by his family, at the age of 79, leaving wife Sylvia and two daughters, five grandchildren and great grandchildren.
