= Jimmy McInch =

Scottish footballer

Personal information
- Full name: James Reid McInch
- Date of birth: 27 June 1953 (age 73)
- Place of birth: Glasgow, Scotland
- Position: Forward

Youth career
- 1970–1972: Cardiff City

Senior career*
Years	Team	Apps	(Gls)
1972–1975	Cardiff City	13	(0)
1975–1977	Bath City	66	(8)
- * Club domestic league appearances and goals

James Reid McInch (born 27 June 1953) is a Scottish former professional footballer.

== Career ==
Born in Glasgow, McInch began his career as a youth player with Cardiff City where he formed a partnership with future Wales international Derek Showers. He was also part of the side that reached the 1971 FA Youth Cup final before losing 2–0 on aggregate to Arsenal. McInch was handed his professional debut in the 1972–73 season but struggled to build on his early promise and made just fifteen first-team appearances, with his only goal coming in the League Cup, before being released in 1975.

He instead joined Bath City, scoring his first goal in a 2–0 win over Wimbledon on 22 October 1975, spending two years with the club, including playing in the final of the 1977 Anglo-Italian Cup against Lecco.
