= Sammy Irvine =

Scottish footballer (born 1956)

Personal information
- Full name: Samuel Irvine
- Date of birth: 7 January 1956 (age 70)
- Place of birth: Glasgow, Scotland
- Position: Midfielder

Senior career*
Years	Team	Apps	(Gls)
1972–1978	Shrewsbury Town	207	(18)
1978–1980	Stoke City	67	(10)
Total		274	(28)
- * Club domestic league appearances and goals

Samuel Irvine (born 7 January 1956) is a Scottish former footballer who played as a midfielder in the Football League for Shrewsbury Town and Stoke City.

== Career ==
Irvine was born in Glasgow but started his career at English side Shrewsbury Town where he made 229 league appearances for the club, scoring 19 goals in six seasons. Under the guidance of Alan Durban the "Shrews" gained promotion from the Fourth Division in 1974–75 and were able to establish themselves in the third tier. In January 1978 Alan Durban joined Second Division Stoke City and less than six months later he signed Irvine for £60,000.

His first season with Stoke was full of promise for Irvine as he played well as Stoke finished in 3rd position and gained promotion back to the First Division. In 1979–80 with Stoke playing at the highest level and Irvine's career seemingly improving it came as a shock when in February 1980 he was involved in a near fatal car crash when his Triumph TR7 collided into a tree. His injuries meant that he had to bring an end to his professional football career at the age of 24.

== Career statistics ==
Appearances and goals by club, season and competition
Club	Season	League			FA Cup		League Cup		Total	
Club	Season	Division	Apps	Goals	Apps	Goals	Apps	Goals	Apps	Goals
Shrewsbury Town	1972–73	Third Division	4	0	0	0	0	0	4	0
Shrewsbury Town	1973–74	Third Division	39	0	0	0	1	0	40	0
Shrewsbury Town	1974–75	Fourth Division	42	2	2	0	2	0	46	2
Shrewsbury Town	1975–76	Third Division	41	6	3	0	3	0	47	6
Shrewsbury Town	1976–77	Third Division	37	0	5	1	1	0	43	1
Shrewsbury Town	1977–78	Third Division	44	10	3	0	2	0	49	10
Shrewsbury Town	Total		207	18	13	1	9	0	229	19
Stoke City	1978–79	Second Division	41	7	1	0	4	2	46	9
Stoke City	1979–80	First Division	26	3	1	0	4	1	31	4
Stoke City	Total		67	10	2	0	8	3	77	13
Career total			274	28	15	1	17	3	306	33

== Honours ==
Shrewsbury Town

- Football League Fourth Division runner-up: 1974–75

Stoke City

- Football League Second Division third-place promotion: 1978–79
