= Steve Finnieston =

Scottish footballer

Personal information
- Date of birth: 30 November 1954 (age 71)
- Place of birth: Edinburgh, Scotland
- Height: 5 ft 11 in (1.80 m)
- Position: Striker

Youth career
- 1966–1974: Chelsea

Senior career*
Years	Team	Apps	(Gls)
1974–1978	Chelsea	80	(34)
1974	→ Cardiff City (loan)	9	(2)
1978–1979	Sheffield United	23	(4)
- Addlestone & Weybridge Town
- Hartley Wintney
- * Club domestic league appearances and goals

Steve Finnieston (born 30 November 1954) is a Scottish retired footballer who played during the 1970s and 1980s, most notably for Chelsea.

A striker, Finnieston first joined Chelsea as a 12-year-old. He signed professional forms in December 1971. He made his debut for the club in a 1–1 draw with Leicester City in 1975 and spent time on loan at Cardiff City during the same season. He didn't establish himself as a regular in the Chelsea first-team until 1976–77. That season was his most prolific, as he struck up an impressive partnership with Kenny Swain and scored 24 league goals, including a crucial winner against promotion rivals Nottingham Forest and a final day hat-trick created by a partnership with Tommy Langley, who also scored, against Hull City.

Chelsea were promoted back to the First Division at the end of the season but thereafter the goals dried up, though he did score in Chelsea's unexpected 4–2 win over European champions Liverpool in the FA Cup third round. He joined Sheffield United in June 1978 and scored four goals for them in 23 appearances. Finnieston retired from professional football in 1980 at the age of 25 due to injury. He made a comeback a year later in non-league football with Addlestone & Weybridge Town and Hartley Wintney. He also played and scored in a friendly for Camberley Town in August 1991 but he never played a competitive game for the club. He later became a postman and worked as a sales rep for Travis Perkins until 2006. He is now self-employed.
