= Gordon Davies (footballer, born 1955) =

Welsh footballer

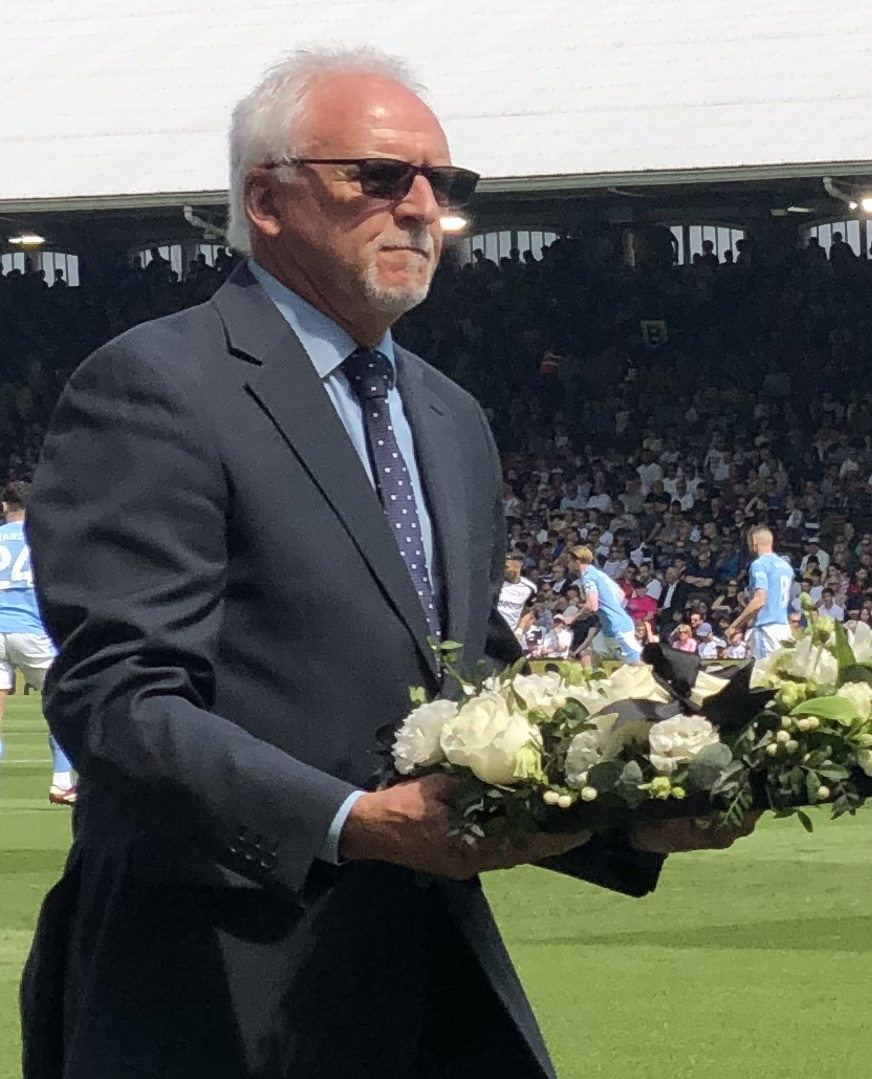
- Davies in 2024

Personal information
- Full name: Gordon John Davies
- Date of birth: 3 August 1955 (age 71)
- Place of birth: Merthyr Tydfil, Wales
- Height: 5 ft 7 in (1.70 m)
- Position: Forward

Youth career
- 1972–1973: Manchester City

Senior career*
Years	Team	Apps	(Gls)
–1978	Merthyr Tydfil		
1978–1984	Fulham	247	(114)
1984–1985	Chelsea	13	(6)
1985–1986	Manchester City	31	(9)
1986–1991	Fulham	147	(45)
1991–1992	Wrexham	22	(4)
1992	Tornado FK		
1992–1993	Northwich Victoria	36	(12)
Total		460+	(178+)

International career
1979–1986	Wales	16	(2)
- * Club domestic league appearances and goals

Gordon John Davies (born 3 August 1955) is a Welsh former footballer who played as a forward. He is best known for his two stints at Fulham, where he is the club's all-time top scorer. He represented Wales on sixteen occasions between 1979 and 1986.

== Club career ==
He joined Fulham in 1978 from Merthyr Tydfil, and spent six years with the London club. After a season with Chelsea after a £90,000 transfer, he was signed by Manchester City for a fee of £100,000. He made his City debut on 12 October 1985 against Watford, and his first goal came two days later in a 6–1 victory over Leeds United in the Full Members Cup; Davies scored a hat-trick that day. Once Billy McNeill departed as City manager, Davies' days at the club were numbered and his final City match was against Southend United in the Football League Cup, and he returned to Fulham in October 1986.

His second spell at Fulham lasted five years, eventually becoming Fulham's all-time top scorer, with 178 goals in 450 appearances. At the end of his Fulham career, the club granted him a testimonial which was played against a Wales XI.

Davies left Fulham in 1991 and went back to Wales to join Wrexham. He became a part of FA Cup history when the minnows beat giants Arsenal in one of the competition's biggest ever shocks. He left the Welsh club in February 1992 to take up an offer of management in Norway with Tornado FK, signing on as player-manager. In the summer of 1992, he returned to the United Kingdom and signed for Northwich Victoria where he spent one season and retired from the game the following close season. He is still a popular and frequent guest at Craven Cottage matches.

== International career ==
Davies made his debut for Wales on 21 November 1979 against Turkey. He made 16 appearances in total (scoring two goals) with his last game against the Republic of Ireland on 26 March 1986.

=== International goals ===
#	Date	Venue	Opponent	Score	Result	Competition
1	31 May 1983	Belfast, Northern Ireland	Northern Ireland	0–1	Win	1983 British Home Championship
2	15 February 1986	Dahran, Saudi Arabia	Saudi Arabia	1–2	Win	Friendly
