= Alex McGregor (footballer, born 1950) =

Scottish footballer (1950–2024)

Personal information
- Full name: Alexander George Penman McGregor
- Date of birth: 12 November 1950
- Place of birth: Glasgow, Scotland
- Date of death: 30 March 2024 (aged 73)
- Height: 5 ft 10 in (1.78 m)
- Position: Winger

Youth career
- Troon

Senior career*
Years	Team	Apps	(Gls)
1969–1973	Ayr United	29	(1)
1973–1974	Hibernian	0	(0)
1974–1976	Shrewsbury Town	49	(7)
1976–1982	Aldershot	177	(17)
- Farnborough Town
Total		255	(25)
- * Club domestic league appearances and goals

Alex McGregor (November 12, 1950 – March 30, 2024) was a Scottish footballer who played for Ayr United, Hibernian, Shrewsbury Town, West Ham, and Aldershot.
