= Gerry Sweeney =

Scottish footballer and manager

Personal information
- Full name: Gerald Sweeney
- Date of birth: 10 July 1945 (age 81)
- Place of birth: Renfrew, Scotland
- Positions: Midfielder; right back

Youth career
- Renfrew

Senior career*
Years	Team	Apps	(Gls)
1966–1971	Morton	137	(16)
1971–1982	Bristol City	500	(22)
1982	York City	12	(0)
1982	Forest Green Rovers	?	(?)
1982–1984	Gloucester City	68	(4)

International career
1969	Scottish League XI	1	(0)

Managerial career
- 1997: Bristol City
- * Club domestic league appearances and goals

Gerald Sweeney (born 10 July 1945) is a Scottish former football player and manager. Sweeney was born in Renfrew, but spent the majority of his time in football with Bristol City.

== Playing career ==
Initially with non-league Renfrew, Sweeney signed for Morton in 1966. He played 137 games for the club before moving to England with Bristol City in 1971. Sweeney was a regular in Alan Dicks's City side that won promotion to the First Division during the 1975–76 season. Sweeney finally left City in 1982 when he was one of the infamous "Ashton Gate Eight", a group of top-earning players who tore up their contracts in order to save the free-falling club from bankruptcy. In all he managed 406 league games for the club, placing him near the top in City's appearance records.

After leaving Bristol City Sweeney rounded out his career in the Football League with a brief spell at York City before finishing his playing career in non-league football with Forest Green Rovers.

== Management ==
Following his retirement from playing Sweeney initially remained in football. He served as a coach at Walsall under Tommy Coakley, a former teammate at Morton, and was instrumental in the Saddlers strong showing during the 1986–87 season.

Sweeney would later return to Ashton Gate and following the departure of Joe Jordan in 1997 he served a spell as caretaker manager. Sweeney had been assistant to Jordan before the latter's departure.

Subsequently, Sweeney left football and worked as a postman in Portishead, Somerset.
