= Derek Clarke =

English footballer

Personal information
- Date of birth: 19 February 1950 (age 76)
- Place of birth: Willenhall, England
- Height: 5 ft 8 1/4 in (1.73 m)
- Position: Forward

Youth career
- –: Walsall

Senior career*
Years	Team	Apps	(Gls)
1967–1968	Walsall	6	(2)
1968–1970	Wolverhampton Wanderers	5	(0)
1970–1976	Oxford United	178	(35)
1976–1978	Orient	36	(6)
1978	→ Carlisle United (loan)	1	(0)
Total		226	(43)
- * Club domestic league appearances and goals

Derek Clarke (born 19 February 1950) is an English former professional footballer who played in the Football League as a forward for Walsall, Wolverhampton Wanderers, Oxford United, where he spent the majority of his career, Orient and Carlisle United. He is the third of five footballing brothers, the others being Frank, Allan, Kelvin and Wayne, who all played League football.

Clarke was born in Willenhall, and began his professional career at nearby Walsall. He joined Wolverhampton Wanderers in 1968, but made just five appearances in two full seasons for the First Division club before moving to Oxford United in October 1970. He spent six years at Oxford, making 178 Second Division appearances, then left the Manor Ground when the club was relegated in 1976. He then joined Orient, where he spent two seasons, which included an appearance in the semi-final of the 1977–78 FA Cup and a loan spell at Carlisle United, before injury forced his retirement.
