= Jack Whitham =

English footballer and manager

Personal information
- Full name: Jack Whitham
- Date of birth: 8 December 1946 (age 79)
- Place of birth: Burnley, England
- Position: Forward

Youth career
- –1964: Holy Trinity F.C.

Senior career*
Years	Team	Apps	(Gls)
1964–1970	Sheffield Wednesday	63	(31)
1970–1974	Liverpool	15	(7)
1974–1975	Cardiff City	14	(3)
1975–1976	Reading	19	(3)

International career
1968	England U23	1	(0)

Managerial career
- ?: Hallam
- * Club domestic league appearances and goals

Jack Whitham is an English former professional footballer who played for Sheffield Wednesday, Liverpool, Cardiff City and Reading. He was a centre forward who only started 111 league games in a nine-year career between 1967 and 1976, scoring 40 goals. He made one appearance for the England under 23 team against Wales in 1968.

Whitham was born in Burnley on 8 December 1946; his grandfather Thomas Whitham of the Coldstream Guards had won the Victoria Cross in 1917 for attacking single-handed an enemy machine gun post. He played amateur football for Holy Trinity F.C. before signing for Sheffield Wednesday in October 1964.

== Playing career ==
=== Sheffield Wednesday ===
Whitham made his debut for Wednesday on 6 May 1967 as a substitute against his home town club Burnley and scored twice in a 7–0 victory. Whitham's time as a Wednesday player was marred by injury problems; his brave style of play meant that he spent long periods on the treatment table and he never played 20 league games in any season. He scored 10 goals in 10 games at the start of the 1968–69 season but never scored again that season as injury took its toll. He still ended up as top scorer that season; his tally included a hat-trick against Manchester United in a memorable 5–4 win on 31 August 1968 which was the highlight of his time at Hillsborough. In the following 1969–70 season he was top scorer again with 11 goals in all competitions as Wednesday were relegated to Division Two. In April 1970 he was transferred to Liverpool for a sum of £57,000. In his time with Wednesday he scored 31 goals in 62 starts, an excellent record of a goal every other match.

=== Liverpool ===
Whitham was signed by Liverpool as a potential replacement for Roger Hunt who had left to join Bolton Wanderers in December 1969. However, his injury problems continued and he failed to get an extended run in the team. The arrival of John Toshack at Anfield in November 1970 further hindered his chances of first team football. He did well towards the end of 1971 when he scored two late goals in an away win at Coventry City and then scoring a hat-trick in a home 3–2 win against Derby County on 11 December 1971. In four years he would play just 15 games for Liverpool, scoring seven goals.

=== Later career ===
Whitham joined Cardiff City for the 1974–75 season, after being invited to a trial by then manager Frank O'Farrell, scoring three goals in 14 appearances before moving to Reading for the following season making 19 appearances as they were promoted from Division Four, his three goals that season all came in the same match against Hartlepool United. Whitham returned to non-League football in 1976 playing for Worksop Town, Hallam F.C. and then Oughtibridge in the local Sheffield league He then went to Hallam as manager before retiring.

== After football ==
After retiring from football, Whitham ran the "Wadsley Jack" a public house in the Wadsley area of Sheffield for 10 years. He then became the manager of the South Yorkshire Police Social Club at Wadsley Bridge.

From 1993 until 2007 Whitham was a part-time scout for Sunderland AFC and in 2007 he joined Luton Town as Chief Scout. After Luton Town went into administration in early 2008 Whitham went to Wolverhampton Wanderers for a short spell before becoming head of player recruitment at Sheffield United. He left Sheff United in June 2010 to become European Scout back at Wolverhampton Wanderers.

He lives in Sheffield with his wife Jose' and they celebrated their 50th Wedding Anniversary in 2020. Away from football he is a well known singer/songwriter around the acoustic music clubs in the South Yorkshire area.
