= Gil Reece =

Welsh footballer

Personal information
- Full name: Gilbert Ivor Reece
- Date of birth: 2 July 1942
- Place of birth: Cardiff, Wales
- Date of death: 20 December 2003 (aged 61)
- Place of death: Cardiff, Wales
- Height: 5 ft 7 in (1.70 m)
- Position: Winger

Senior career*
Years	Team	Apps	(Gls)
1961–1962	Cardiff City	0	(0)
1962	→ Ton Pentre (loan)		
1962–1963	Pembroke Borough		
1963–1965	Newport County	32	(9)
1965–1973	Sheffield United	210	(58)
1973–1976	Cardiff City	100	(23)
1976–1977	Swansea City	2	(0)

International career
1965–1975	Wales	29	(2)
- * Club domestic league appearances and goals

Gilbert Ivor '"Gil" Reece (2 July 1942 – 20 December 2003) was a Welsh international footballer. Described by former Wales manager Mike Smith as "a very quick player, sharp and tough", he made over 300 appearances in the Football League during spells with Cardiff City, Sheffield United, Newport County and Swansea City and won 29 caps for Wales.

== Club career ==
Reece was born in Cardiff and represented Wales at schoolboy level before being offered an apprenticeship at his hometown club Cardiff City. He made his way into the reserve side before spending a period on loan at Ton Pentre and was released by the club during the 1962–63 season and joined Pembroke Borough. During his time in Pembroke, Reece worked as a plumber whilst playing part-time. In 1963, Newport County manager Billy Lucas offered Reece another chance at professional football and, after just one season Somerton Park, his impressive displays convinced Sheffield United to pay £10,000 in April 1965 to sign him. Soon after he was called up to win his first cap for Wales against England.

He settled quickly with the Blades, helping them to a ninth-place finish in the First Division during his first season but suffered a badly broken leg the following year which kept him out of the side for nearly a year. Despite this he went on to appear over 200 times for the club, establishing himself as a fan favourite with the Bramall Lane crowd. He returned to his hometown club Cardiff City in September 1972 alongside teammate Dave Powell in an exchange deal for Alan Warboys. Appointed club captain, he went on to play in a variety of different roles for the club and in his first two seasons his goals helped the club win the Welsh Cup, scoring a hat-trick in the second leg of the 1973 final and once in the second leg of the 1974 final. The club suffered relegation during the 1974–75 season, with Reece finishing as the club's top scorer with 8 goals, but managed to win promotion on the first time of asking the following year. Reece left the club at the end of the season and joined Swansea City where he spent a short time before retiring.

After 1976 Reece played for non-League Barry Town.

== After football ==
On retiring from his playing career he ran a family heating business before becoming a hotelier in Cardiff, running the Clare Court hotel in Grangetown. In April 2000, Reece was forced to have his right leg amputated after continually developing cysts behind his knee. He died in Cardiff, aged 61.

He was also the brother of Welsh boxer Leonard "Luggie" Reece, and Grandfather of Welsh Rugby League International Lewis Reece.

== Baseball ==
Reece has the rare distinction of being a double international at baseball and football. He was capped by Wales in baseball for the annual international against England in July 1963. After retiring from professional football he returned to baseball playing well into his 40s. He played for the St Francis, Grange Catholics and Grange Albion baseball clubs.

== Honours ==
Cardiff City

- Welsh Cup winner: 1972–73, 1973–74
