= David Powell (footballer, born 1944) =

Welsh footballer (1944–2023)

Personal information
- Date of birth: 15 October 1944
- Place of birth: Dolgarrog, Wales
- Date of death: 4 December 2023 (aged 79)
- Place of death: Swansea, Wales
- Height: 5 ft 10 in (1.78 m)
- Position: Defender

Youth career
- Gwydir Rovers

Senior career*
Years	Team	Apps	(Gls)
1963–1968	Wrexham	134	(0)
1968–1972	Sheffield United	89	(2)
1972–1974	Cardiff City	36	(1)
Total		259	(3)

International career
1966–1968	Wales U23	4	(0)
1968–1972	Wales	11	(1)
Medal record
Wrexham
Runner-up	Welsh Cup	1965
Sheffield United
Runner-up	Second Division	1971
Cardiff City
Winner	Welsh Cup	1973
- * Club domestic league appearances and goals

David Powell (15 October 1944 – 4 December 2023) was a Welsh professional footballer who played as a defender. He played for Wrexham, Sheffield United and Cardiff City before being forced to retire through injury. He also represented Wales at full international level, winning eleven caps.

== Club career ==
Powell was born in Dolgarrog. Having played with local side Gwydir Rovers as a youth, he was taken on as an apprentice by Wrexham in January 1962 where he worked as a member of the ground staff. By May 1968 he had graduated to the first team and was handed his first professional contract, going on to make 134 appearances for the Welsh club.

Powell was signed by Sheffield United in September 1968 for a fee of £28,500. He became a regular in United's defence for the following three seasons, being voted the club's Player of the Year in 1969, and was an integral part of the side that gained promotion to the English top-flight in 1971. Unfortunately for Powell he badly injured his knee during a game at Queens Park Rangers towards the end of that season and remained sidelined for over a year.

Powell was eventually released by United in September 1972 to allow him to return to Wales and join Cardiff City. He played for a further two seasons, making 36 league appearances for the Bluebirds before retiring through injury. The highlights of his City career came as the side won the 1973 Welsh Cup and subsequently gained entry into the European Cup Winners' Cup where they lost out to Ferencvaros.

== International career ==
Powell made his debut for Wales U23's in October 1966, in an 8–0 loss to England. After a further three appearances for the U23s he graduated to the full senior squad and gained his first cap on 8 May 1968 in a 1–1 draw with West Germany. Powell played eleven games for Wales in total, scoring once in October 1969 during a 1–3 loss to East Germany.

== Personal life and death ==
Following his retirement from football, Powell took a job with the South Wales Police, working at their training centre in Bridgend and coaching their football team. Following his retirement from the police Powell settled in the Swansea area. He died there on 4 December 2023, at the age of 79.

== Career statistics ==
Scores and results list Wales' goal tally first, score column indicates score after each Powell goal.

List of international goals scored by David Powell
No.	Date	Venue	Opponent	Score	Result	Competition
1	22 October 1969	Ninian Park, Cardiff, Wales	East Germany	1–3	1–3	1970 World Cup qualification

== Honours ==
Wrexham

- Welsh Cup: runner-up: 1965

Sheffield United

- Second Division runner-up: 1971

Cardiff City

- Welsh Cup: 1973
