= Ron Healey =

Irish footballer (1952–2018)

Personal information
- Full name: Ronald Healey
- Date of birth: 30 August 1952
- Place of birth: Manchester, England
- Date of death: 18 June 2018 (aged 65)
- Place of death: Altrincham, England
- Height: 5 ft 11 in (1.80 m)
- Position: Goalkeeper

Senior career*
Years	Team	Apps	(Gls)
1970–1974	Manchester City	30	(0)
1972	→ Coventry City (loan)	3	(0)
1973–1974	→ Preston North End (loan)	6	(0)
1974–1982	Cardiff City	216	(0)
Total		255	(0)

International career
1977–1980	Republic of Ireland	2	(0)
- * Club domestic league appearances and goals

Ronald Healey (30 August 1952 – 18 June 2018) was an Irish professional footballer who played as a goalkeeper. Born in England, Healey played for Cardiff City and Manchester City during his career and earned two caps for the Republic of Ireland national team.

== Club career ==
Healey began his career with Manchester City. Following an apprenticeship with City, he signed professional forms for the club in October 1969 and he made his debut at 17. As he was the understudy to the English international goalkeeper Joe Corrigan, he only played 30 times for City between 1970 and 1974 before moving to Cardiff City in March 1974, making his debut in a 2–2 draw with West Bromwich Albion. On his arrival he shared the no.1 spot with Bill Irwin before eventually managing to claim the spot as his own. During the 1975–76 season he helped the club to win promotion to Division Two.

After a spell with Bangor City, he retired from the game through injury.

== International career ==
Healey also played international football twice for the Republic of Ireland national team. He kept a clean sheet on his international debut, a 0–0 draw with Poland on 24 April 1977 and made his only other appearance as a substitute for Gerry Peyton in a World Cup qualifier against England at Wembley Stadium in 1980.

== Death ==
On 18 June 2018, Healey died after collapsing on a cycle ride.

== See also ==
- List of Republic of Ireland international footballers born outside the Republic of Ireland
