= Albert Larmour =

Northern Ireland footballer

Personal information
- Full name: Albert Andrew James Larmour
- Date of birth: 27 May 1951 (age 75)
- Place of birth: Belfast, Northern Ireland
- Height: 5 ft 11 in (1.80 m)
- Position: Defender

Senior career*
Years	Team	Apps	(Gls)
?–1972	Linfield	51	(6)
1972–1979	Cardiff City	154	(14)
1979–1982	Torquay United	50	(4)
- * Club domestic league appearances and goals

Albert Andrew James Larmour (born 27 May 1951) is a former Northern Irish professional footballer.

== Early life ==
He was born in Donegall Road area of Belfast. Before becoming a professional footballer, Larmour worked as a welder in an aircraft factory in Belfast.

== Playing career ==
Starting his career at Linfield, he joined Cardiff City in June 1972 for £14,000, the second highest transfer fee in Ireland at the time, after manager Jimmy Scoular spotted him during a trip to watch goalkeeper Bill Irwin. A year later, the 1974–75 season, he began to make an impact on the first team, scoring his first goal for the club during a 5–2 loss to Wrexham in the second leg of the Welsh Cup final. He helped Cardiff City to promotion the following year with a very consistent run before losing his place in the 1978–79 season when Cardiff paid £65,000 to bring Hull City defender Dave Roberts to the club. He joined Torquay United instead, being handed captaincy on his arrival and spending two years at the club before retiring after a car accident and became a very popular head of the successful academy.
