= Ian Walsh (footballer) =

Welsh footballer

Personal information
- Full name: Ian Patrick Walsh
- Date of birth: 4 September 1958 (age 68)
- Place of birth: St David's, Wales
- Height: 5 ft 9 in (1.75 m)
- Position: Forward

Senior career*
Years	Team	Apps	(Gls)
1976–1982	Crystal Palace	117	(23)
1982–1984	Swansea City	37	(11)
1984–1986	Barnsley	49	(15)
1986–1987	Grimsby Town	41	(13)
1987–1989	Cardiff City	17	(4)

International career
1979–1982	Wales	18	(7)
- * Club domestic league appearances and goals

Ian Patrick Walsh (born 4 September 1958 in St David's) is a former Wales international footballer.

== Club career ==
Walsh began his career at Crystal Palace, winning the FA Youth Cup in 1977, before forcing his way into the first team, making his debut in a 2–1 defeat to Chester City on 4 September 1976 at the age of 18, where he was a key member of the side that won the Division Two title in the 1978–79 season. After playing over 100 times for the side, he joined Swansea City in February 1982, spending two years at the Vetch Field before leaving following the club's relegation in 1984.

He spent two years at Barnsley, scoring fifteen times, before leaving for Grimsby Town where he won promotion in his first season. His second year at Grimsby was hampered by a number of minor injuries and he was allowed to leave midway through the season to sign for Cardiff City. The majority of his appearances at Ninian Park came as a substitute and he was forced into retirement in 1989.

== International career ==
Walsh made a goalscoring debut for Wales in September 1979 during a 2–1 win over Republic of Ireland, becoming a regular for the side of the following four years before making his final appearance on 2 June 1982 in a 1–0 win over France. Wales comprehensively defeated England at The Racecourse Ground, Wrexham, in May, 1980, with Walsh among the goalscorers in a 4-1 Victory.

== After football ==
Walsh subsequently became a commentator and football pundit for BBC Wales.

He is also the uncle of former Premier League footballer Simon Davies who played for Wales and Fulham.
