= David Giles (footballer) =

Welsh footballer

Personal information
- Full name: David Charles Giles
- Date of birth: 21 September 1956 (age 70)
- Place of birth: Cardiff, Wales
- Height: 5 ft 7 in (1.70 m)
- Position: Midfielder

Youth career
- Cardiff City

Senior career*
Years	Team	Apps	(Gls)
1974–1978	Cardiff City	59	(3)
1978–1980	Wrexham	38	(3)
1980–1982	Swansea City	54	(13)
1981–1982	→ Leyton Orient (loan)	3	(2)
1982–1984	Crystal Palace	88	(6)
1984–1985	Birmingham City	0	(0)
1985	Newport County	32	(1)
1985–1987	Cardiff City	50	(0)
1987	Stroud		
1987–1988?	Barry Town	30	(4)

International career
1980–1983	Wales	12	(2)

Managerial career
- 1994–1995: Ebbw Vale
- 1999: Inter Cardiff (joint)
- * Club domestic league appearances and goals

David Charles Giles (born 21 September 1956) is a Welsh former professional footballer and Wales international. During his career he attained 12 caps for Wales, scoring on two occasions.

== Career ==
Giles was a Welsh schoolboy international when he signed for Cardiff City. He made his debut for the Bluebirds in a 0–0 draw against Nottingham Forest in February 1975. Unable to hold down a permanent first team spot he left the club in December 1978 for £20,000 and joined Wrexham where he spent two years before again moving on, this time for £40,000 to Swansea City. He continued to move around in the next few seasons, playing for Leyton Orient on loan before moving to Crystal Palace and then Birmingham City.

After a spell at Newport County he returned to the club where he started his career, Cardiff City. Giles then played for Stroud.

He later joined Barry Town on a part-time basis eventually retiring there.

In 1994, he became manager of League of Wales side Ebbw Vale. He later had a short spell in charge of Inter Cardiff, jointly with his brother Paul.

== After football ==
Giles was a regular analyst for ITV Wales on the late night football magazine show Wales Soccer Night until its axing in December 2005.

He also works as a journalist and previously wrote a regular sports column in the South Wales Echo covering Cardiff City and the Wales team.
