= Derek Showers =

Welsh footballer

Personal information
- Date of birth: 28 January 1953 (age 73)
- Place of birth: Merthyr Tydfil, Wales
- Height: 5 ft 10 in (1.78 m)
- Position: Striker

Senior career*
Years	Team	Apps	(Gls)
1970–1977	Cardiff City	83	(10)
1977–1979	AFC Bournemouth	60	(19)
1979–1980	Portsmouth	39	(8)
1980–1983	Hereford United	89	(13)
1983–?	Dorchester Town	?	(?)
1985–86	Barry Town	13+1	(10)

International career
1975	Wales	2	(0)
- * Club domestic league appearances and goals

Derek Showers (born 28 January 1953) is a Welsh former professional footballer and Wales international. During his career he picked up the nickname "Nookie Bear" due to his resemblance to Roger DeCourcey who operated the puppet bear.

== Career ==
Born in Merthyr Tydfil, Showers began his career at Cardiff City whom he joined at the age of 15 after being spotted on a coaching course by John Charles, Colin Baker and Bobby Ferguson. He was a prolific scorer for the youth teams at Cardiff and as such he was fast tracked into the first team at the age of 17 due to the recent sale of John Toshack. He made his debut in December 1970 in a 1–0 defeat at the hands of Oxford United.

Due to his young age Showers struggled in the competitive nature of the game but was always credited with giving 100 percent for the team. But after Cardiff started to slide down the table in future years he came under scrutiny from fans at Ninian Park and was sold not long after to AFC Bournemouth. He managed to rediscover his goalscoring touch there in his two years before he moved to nearby Portsmouth. He made his debut as a substitute against Wigan Athletic in February 1979 and scored his first goal for the club a month later with a late winner against Torquay United. At the start of his only full season at Portsmouth he suffered a serious injury while playing against Stockport County which ended his season but the club managed to scrape a promotion to Division Three.

He began the following season on the Portsmouth bench only making occasional appearances but he still managed to come off the bench to force an own goal [by Alan Kennedy] against Liverpool at Anfield on 28 October 1980 during a 4–1 defeat. The following month Portsmouth crashed to a 3–0 defeat at Colchester United and Showers was sold to Hereford United. After leaving Hereford he had spells playing non-league football for Dorchester Town and Barry Town before retiring. He later became involved with the Cardiff City youth programme before going to work for the Royal Mail.

During his career Showers won two caps for Wales, including coming on as a substitute at Wembley during a 2–2 draw with England in 1975.
