= 1969–70 Luton Town F.C. season =

English football club season

Luton Town
1969–70 season
- Chairman: Tony Hunt
- Manager: Alec Stock
- Stadium: Kenilworth Road
- Division Three: 2nd
- League Cup: Third round
- FA Cup: Second round
- Top goalscorer: League: Malcolm Macdonald (25); All: Malcolm Macdonald (28)
- Highest home attendance: 18,065 v Bournemouth & Boscombe Athletic (Division Three, 7 October 1969)
- Lowest home attendance: 11,368 v Tranmere Rovers (Division Three, 3 March 1970)
- Average home league attendance: 14,808
- Biggest win: 5–0 v Bradford City (H), Division Three, 13 December 1969; 5–0 v Reading (H), Division Three, 28 March 1970
- Biggest defeat: 1–5 v Shrewsbury Town (A), Division Three, 10 January 1970

The 1969–70 season was the 84th in the history of Luton Town Football Club. They finished as runners-up in the Third Division to win a second promotion in the space of three seasons.

== Squad ==
Players who made one appearance or more for Luton Town F.C. during the 1969-70 season

Pos.	Nat.	Name	League		League Cup		FA Cup		Total	
Pos.	Nat.	Name	Apps	Goals	Apps	Goals	Apps	Goals	Apps	Goals
GK	SCO	Sandy Davie	31	0	2	0	3	0	36	0
GK	ENG	Tony Read	9	0	3	0	0	0	12	0
GK	ENG	Alan Starling	6	0	0	0	0	0	6	0
DF	ENG	Jack Bannister	40	0	5	0	3	0	48	0
DF	ENG	Terry Branston	18(1)	0	5	1	2	0	25(2)	1
DF	SCO	Max Dougan	7	0	3	0	0	0	10	0
DF	SCO	Fred Jardine	9(1)	0	0	0	0(1)	0	9(2)	0
DF	SCO	John Moore	22(1)	0	1	0	0	0	23(1)	0
DF	NIR	Chris Nicholl	27	2	0	0	1	0	28	2
DF	ENG	John Ryan	36	2	2	0	3	0	41	2
MF	ENG	Graham French	38(1)	4	5	0	3	0	46(1)	4
MF	ENG	Mike Harrison	10(2)	4	0	0	0(1)	0	10(3)	4
MF	ENG	Mike Keen	45(1)	3	5	0	3	0	53(1)	3
MF	ENG	Brian Lewis	2(3)	0	1	2	0	0	3(3)	2
MF	ENG	Alan Slough	45	4	5	0	3	0	53	4
FW	ENG	Keith Allen	32(6)	7	5	2	3	0	40(6)	9
FW	ENG	Viv Busby	9	4	0	0	0	0	9	4
FW	ENG	John Collins	42(1)	10	3	0	3	2	48(1)	12
FW	ENG	Malcolm Macdonald	46	25	5	2	3	1	54	28
FW	ENG	Peter Phillips	2(3)	0	0	0	0	0	2(3)	0
FW	WAL	Laurie Sheffield	3(3)	0	4(1)	2	0	0	7(4)	2
FW	SCO	Matt Tees	30(2)	11	1	0	3	2	34(2)	13

== League table ==
Pos	Team	Pld	W	D	L	GF	GA	GAv	Pts	Promotion or relegation
1	Orient (C, P)	46	25	12	9	67	36	1.861	62	Promotion to the Second Division
2	Luton Town (P)	46	23	14	9	77	43	1.791	60	Promotion to the Second Division
3	Bristol Rovers	46	20	16	10	80	59	1.356	56	
4	Fulham	46	20	15	11	81	55	1.473	55	Qualified for the Watney Cup (Note: The two teams who scored the most goals in each division, and did not qualify for Europe and were not promoted, qualified for the Watney Cup.)
5	Brighton & Hove Albion	46	23	9	14	57	43	1.326	55	

(C) Champions; (P) Promoted

== Results ==
=== Third Division ===
9 August 1969 1	Luton Town	3–0	Barrow	Luton
	Allen 27'; Collins 37'; Keen 89'			Stadium: Kenilworth Road; Attendance: 12,080

16 August 1969 2	Bournemouth & Boscombe Athletic	0–1	Luton Town	Bournemouth
			Macdonald 29'	Stadium: Dean Court; Attendance: 9,578

23 August 1969 3	Luton Town	3–2	Orient	Luton
	Collins 74'; French 80'; Macdonald 87'		Jones 14'; Bullock 60'	Stadium: Kenilworth Road; Attendance: 13,761

26 August 1969 4	Luton Town	1–1	Halifax Town	Luton
	Macdonald 5'		Hill 27'	Stadium: Kenilworth Road; Attendance: 13,759

30 August 1969 5	Gillingham	0–2	Luton Town	Gillingham
			Macdonald 13' (pen.); Green 76' (o.g.)	Stadium: Priestfield; Attendance: 7,792

6 September 1969 6	Luton Town	4–0	Bristol Rovers	Luton
	Collins 12'; Tees 55'; Macdonald 56'; Allen 88'			Stadium: Kenilworth Road; Attendance: 15,198

13 September 1969 7	Bradford City	1–1	Luton Town	Bradford
	Ham 77'		Allen 53'	Stadium: Valley Parade; Attendance: 10,851

16 September 1969 8	Southport	0–3	Luton Town	Southport
			Macdonald 57'; French 71'; Nicholl 86'	Stadium: Haig Avenue; Attendance: 4,003

20 September 1969 9	Luton Town	2–2	Shrewsbury Town	Luton
	Collins 54'; Slough 85'		Slough 53' (o.g.); Roberts 77'	Stadium: Kenilworth Road; Attendance: 15,396

27 September 1969 10	Plymouth Argyle	1–3	Luton Town	Plymouth
	Nicholl 50' (o.g.)		Tees 45', 79'; French 81'	Stadium: Home Park; Attendance: 14,111

30 September 1969 11	Walsall	1–3	Luton Town	Walsall
	Taylor 2'		Tees 1', 59'; Collins 68'	Stadium: Fellows Park; Attendance: 7,557

4 October 1969 12	Luton Town	2–0	Stockport County	Luton
	Nicholl 17'; Macdonald 60' (pen.)			Stadium: Kenilworth Road; Attendance: 15,944

7 October 1969 13	Luton Town	0–0	Bournemouth & Boscombe Athletic	Luton
				Stadium: Kenilworth Road; Attendance: 18,065

11 October 1969 14	Doncaster Rovers	2–0	Luton Town	Doncaster
	Slough 33' (o.g.); Briggs 48'			Stadium: Belle Vue; Attendance: 17,380

18 October 1969 15	Brighton & Hove Albion	1–2	Luton Town	Hove
	Bell 69'		Collins 29', 46'	Stadium: Goldstone Ground; Attendance: 20,016

25 October 1969 16	Luton Town	1–1	Torquay United	Luton
	Tees 56'		Ryan 22' (o.g.)	Stadium: Kenilworth Road; Attendance: 16,087

1 November 1969 17	Rotherham United	1–1	Luton Town	Rotherham
	Leigh 42' (pen.)		Allen 56'	Stadium: Millmoor; Attendance: 8,911

8 November 1969 18	Luton Town	1–1	Barnsley	Luton
	Macdonald 6'		Howard 49'	Stadium: Kenilworth Road; Attendance: 17,442

22 November 1969 19	Luton Town	2–0	Rochdale	Luton
	Collins 75'; Allen 86'			Stadium: Kenilworth Road; Attendance: 15,876

25 November 1969 20	Luton Town	1–0	Fulham	Luton
	Macdonald 47'			Stadium: Kenilworth Road; Attendance: 16,485

13 December 1969 21	Luton Town	5–0	Bradford City	Luton
	Tees 10'; Macdonald 14', 84', 88' (pen.); Collins 44'			Stadium: Kenilworth Road; Attendance: 11,857

26 December 1969 22	Orient	1–0	Luton Town	London
	Allen 8'			Stadium: Brisbane Road; Attendance: 17,619

27 December 1969 23	Luton Town	1–2	Gillingham	Luton
	Keen 52'		Green 73', 78'	Stadium: Kenilworth Road; Attendance: 17,402

10 January 1970 24	Shrewsbury Town	5–1	Luton Town	Shrewsbury
	Andrews 11'; Moir 24', 43'; McLaughlin 28'; Harkin 76'		Harrison 59'	Stadium: Gay Meadow; Attendance: 4,406

17 January 1970 25	Luton Town	0–2	Plymouth Argyle	Luton
			Rickard 45'; Bickle 72'	Stadium: Kenilworth Road; Attendance: 12,358

24 January 1970 26	Bury	1–3	Luton Town	Bury
	Anderson 68'		Macdonald 5'; Tees 29', 72'	Stadium: Gigg Lane; Attendance: 6,813

31 January 1970 27	Stockport County	1–1	Luton Town	Stockport
	Goodwin 85'		Tees 46'	Stadium: Edgeley Park; Attendance: 3,922

7 February 1970 28	Luton Town	4–0	Doncaster Rovers	Luton
	Slough 40'; Macdonald 51', 81' (pen.); Tees 83'			Stadium: Kenilworth Road; Attendance: 12,828

10 February 1970 29	Bristol Rovers	3–0	Luton Town	Bristol
	Graydon 20'; Munro 53' (pen.); Ford 80' (pen.)			Stadium: Eastville; Attendance: 13,304

14 February 1970 30	Barrow	2–1	Luton Town	Barrow-in-Furness
	Mulvaney 68'; Morrin 71'		French 54'	Stadium: Holker Street; Attendance: 3,843

21 February 1970 31	Torquay United	2–2	Luton Town	Torquay
	Mitchinson 63'; Rudge 86'		Harrison 71'; Macdonald 72'	Stadium: Plainmoor; Attendance: 6,964

28 February 1970 32	Luton Town	1–1	Brighton & Hove Albion	Luton
	Macdonald 54' (pen.)		Ryan 43' (o.g.)	Stadium: Kenilworth Road; Attendance: 17,584

3 March 1970 33	Luton Town	2–0	Tranmere Rovers	Luton
	Macdonald 42'; Ryan 59'			Stadium: Kenilworth Road; Attendance: 11,368

11 March 1970 34	Reading	0–1	Luton Town	Reading
			Macdonald 89'	Stadium: Elm Park; Attendance: 18,929

14 March 1970 35	Luton Town	2–2	Mansfield Town	Luton
	Ryan 23'; Harrison 53'		Roberts 51'; Partridge 58'	Stadium: Kenilworth Road; Attendance: 12,690

17 March 1970 36	Luton Town	0–0	Bury	Luton
				Stadium: Kenilworth Road; Attendance: 12,751

21 March 1970 37	Tranmere Rovers	3–2	Luton Town	Birkenhead
	Yardley 3'; Pritchard 44'; Beamish 73'		Allen 19'; Slough 81'	Stadium: Prenton Park; Attendance: 4,035

27 March 1970 38	Luton Town	2–1	Rotherham United	Luton
	Allen 9'; Slough 32'		Swift 14'	Stadium: Kenilworth Road; Attendance: 14,315

28 March 1970 39	Luton Town	5–0	Reading	Luton
	Macdonald 11', 46', 51'; Busby 57'; Harrison 85'			Stadium: Kenilworth Road; Attendance: 14,401

31 March 1970 40	Barnsley	2–1	Luton Town	Barnsley
	Dean 36'; Hamstead 89'		Keen 59'	Stadium: Oakwell; Attendance: 9,988

4 April 1970 41	Halifax Town	0–0	Luton Town	Halifax
				Stadium: The Shay; Attendance: 3,482

8 April 1970 42	Fulham	0–1	Luton Town	London
			Macdonald 10'	Stadium: Craven Cottage; Attendance: 18,987

11 April 1970 43	Luton Town	3–0	Walsall	Luton
	Busby 8'; Collins 25'; Macdonald 43'			Stadium: Kenilworth Road; Attendance: 17,173

14 April 1970 44	Luton Town	1–0	Southport	Luton
	Busby 48'			Stadium: Kenilworth Road; Attendance: 16,756

20 April 1970 45	Mansfield Town	0–0	Luton Town	Mansfield
				Stadium: Field Mill; Attendance: 10,301

25 April 1970 46	Rochdale	1–2	Luton Town	Rochdale
	Jenkins 62'		Busby 15'; Macdonald 54'	Stadium: Spotland; Attendance: 5,886

=== League Cup ===
13 August 1969 First Round	Peterborough United	1–1	Luton Town	Peterborough
	Price 11'		Sheffield 22'	Stadium: London Road; Attendance: 10,249

19 August 1969 First Round Replay	Luton Town	5–2	Peterborough United	Luton
	Macdonald 23'; Branston 30'; Lewis 41', 59' (pen.); Allen 70'		Iley 8'; Robson 57'	Stadium: Kenilworth Road; Attendance: 13,105

2 September 1969 Second Round	Luton Town	2–2	Millwall	Luton
	Macdonald 8'; Sheffield 30'		Possee 5'; Weller 62'	Stadium: Kenilworth Road; Attendance: 17,372

8 September 1969 Second Round Replay	Millwall	0–1 (a.e.t.)	Luton Town	London
			Allen 117'	Stadium: The Den; Attendance: 14,125

23 September 1969 Third Round	Sheffield United	3–0	Luton Town	Sheffield
	Woodward 28', 55'; Tudor 77'			Stadium: Bramall Lane; Attendance: 16,884

=== FA Cup ===
15 November 1969 First Round	Bournemouth & Boscombe Athletic	1–1	Luton Town	Bournemouth
	Hartley 11'		Collins 44'	Stadium: Dean Court; Attendance: 7,362

18 November 1969 First Round Replay	Luton Town	3–1	Bournemouth & Boscombe Athletic	Luton
	Collins 33'; Tees 40'; Macdonald 48'		White 3'	Stadium: Kenilworth Road; Attendance: 13,384

6 December 1969 Second Round	Hillingdon Borough	2–1	Luton Town	Yiewsley
	Reeve 43'; Townend 53'		Tees 9'	Stadium: Leas Stadium; Attendance: 9,330
