= 1968–69 Luton Town F.C. season =

English football club season

Luton Town
1968–69 season
- Chairman: Tommy Hodgson (until February 1969); Tony Hunt
- Manager: Allan Brown (until December 1968); Alec Stock
- Stadium: Kenilworth Road
- Division Three: 3rd
- League Cup: Third round
- FA Cup: Third round
- Top goalscorer: League: Brian Lewis (22); All: Brian Lewis (23)
- Highest home attendance: 25,253 v Watford (Division Three, 30 April 1969)
- Lowest home attendance: 10,952 v Ware (FA Cup, 16 November 1968)
- Average home league attendance: 14,896
- Biggest win: 6–1 v Ware (H), FA Cup, 16 November 1968
- Biggest defeat: 1–5 v Everton (A), League Cup, 24 September 1968

The 1968–69 season was the 83rd in the history of Luton Town Football Club. They finished 3rd in the Third Division, missing out on a second successive promotion, despite an unbeaten home record and a late-season charge which saw them lose only one of their last 20 league matches.

== Squad ==
Players who made one appearance or more for Luton Town F.C. during the 1968-69 season

Pos.	Nat.	Name	League		League Cup		FA Cup		Total	
Pos.	Nat.	Name	Apps	Goals	Apps	Goals	Apps	Goals	Apps	Goals
GK	SCO	Sandy Davie	27	0	0	0	3	0	30	0
GK	ENG	Tony Read	16	0	4	0	0	0	20	0
GK	SCO	Billy Taylor	3	0	0	0	0	0	3	0
DF	ENG	Jack Bannister	30	0	0	0	3	0	33	0
DF	ENG	Terry Branston	35	4	3	0	3	0	41	4
DF	SCO	Max Dougan	43	0	4	0	3	0	50	0
DF	SCO	Fred Jardine	23(1)	2	3	0	0	0	26(1)	2
DF	SCO	Billy McDerment	15(6)	1	2(1)	0	2(1)	0	19(8)	1
DF	SCO	John Moore	29(4)	1	2	0	1	0	32(4)	1
DF	SCO	George Potter	0(2)	0	0	0	1	1	1(2)	1
MF	ENG	Peter Denton	1	0	0	0	0	0	1	0
MF	ENG	Graham French	35(1)	3	3	0	3	1	41(1)	4
MF	ENG	Mike Harrison	18(1)	2	3	2	2	2	23(1)	6
MF	ENG	Mike Keen	14	1	0	0	0	0	14	1
MF	ENG	Brian Lewis	43(2)	22	4	1	3	0	50(2)	23
MF	SCO	Bruce Rioch	37	10	3	1	3	0	43	11
MF	ENG	John O. Ryan	7(1)	0	2(1)	0	0	0	9(2)	0
MF	ENG	Alan Slough	46	5	4	2	3	2	53	9
MF	ENG	Ray Whittaker	7(1)	0	0	0	0	0	7(1)	0
FW	ENG	Keith Allen	37(3)	9	2	0	1(1)	3	40(4)	12
FW	ENG	Micky Brown	1(1)	0	0	0	0	0	1(1)	0
FW	ENG	Ian Buxton	10(1)	1	1	0	1	0	12(1)	1
FW	WAL	Laurie Sheffield	28(1)	12	4	3	1	0	33(1)	15
FW	SCO	Morris Stevenson	1	0	0	0	0	0	1	0

== League table ==
Pos	Team	Pld	W	D	L	GF	GA	GAv	Pts	Promotion or relegation
1	Watford (C, P)	46	27	10	9	74	34	2.176	64	Promotion to the Second Division
2	Swindon Town (P)	46	27	10	9	71	35	2.029	64	Promotion to the Second Division
3	Luton Town	46	25	11	10	74	38	1.947	61	
4	Bournemouth & Boscombe Athletic	46	21	9	16	60	45	1.333	51	
5	Plymouth Argyle	46	17	15	14	53	49	1.082	49	

Source: rsssf.com
Rules for classification: 1) points; 2) goal average; 3) number of goals scored.
(C) Champions; (P) Promoted

== Results ==
=== Third Division ===
10 August 1968 1	Luton Town	4–0	Oldham Athletic	Luton
	Harrison 17' (pen.); Allen 43'; Jardine 61'; Lewis 89'			Stadium: Kenilworth Road; Attendance: 14,747

17 August 1968 2	Barrow	0–0	Luton Town	Barrow-in-Furness
				Stadium: Holker Street; Attendance: 6,628

24 August 1968 3	Luton Town	3–1	Rotherham United	Luton
	Rioch 9', 15'; Lewis 42'		Storrie 24'	Stadium: Kenilworth Road; Attendance: 14,163

28 August 1968 4	Luton Town	5–1	Barnsley	Luton
	Rioch 19'; Branston 28'; Lewis 33', 54'; Allen 61'		Earnshaw 51'	Stadium: Kenilworth Road; Attendance: 15,899

31 August 1968 5	Gillingham	1–3	Luton Town	Gillingham
	Williams 42'		Lewis 5', 70'; Sheffield 39'	Stadium: Priestfield; Attendance: 8,227

7 September 1968 6	Orient	0–0	Luton Town	London
				Stadium: Brisbane Road; Attendance: 13,719

14 September 1968 7	Luton Town	3–1	Tranmere Rovers	Luton
	Sheffield 22'; Lewis 60'; Branston 65'		MacNamee 42'	Stadium: Kenilworth Road; Attendance: 12,965

18 September 1968 8	Luton Town	4–2	Mansfield Town	Luton
	Harrison 18' (pen.); Sheffield 69'; Lewis 73'; French 78'		Jones 48'; Partridge 82'	Stadium: Kenilworth Road; Attendance: 19,315

21 September 1968 9	Brighton & Hove Albion	1–0	Luton Town	Hove
	Wilkinson 44'			Stadium: Goldstone Ground; Attendance: 11,930

28 September 1968 10	Luton Town	1–0	Torquay United	Luton
	Lewis 48'			Stadium: Kenilworth Road; Attendance: 14,936

5 October 1968 11	Watford	1–0	Luton Town	Watford
	Low 4'			Stadium: Vicarage Road; Attendance: 22,133

8 October 1968 12	Barnsley	3–1	Luton Town	Barnsley
	Evans 15'; Earnshaw 38'; Hamstead 76'		Sheffield 48'	Stadium: Oakwell; Attendance: 13,019

12 October 1968 13	Luton Town	3–0	Hartlepool	Luton
	Sheffield 27'; Rioch 49'; Lewis 77'			Stadium: Kenilworth Road; Attendance: 13,415

19 October 1968 14	Plymouth Argyle	2–0	Luton Town	Plymouth
	Burnside 12'; Piper 24'			Stadium: Home Park; Attendance: 12,659

26 October 1968 15	Luton Town	2–1	Northampton Town	Luton
	Allen 25'; Sheffield 27'		Fairbrother 65'	Stadium: Kenilworth Road; Attendance: 17,818

5 November 1968 16	Walsall	2–0	Luton Town	Walsall
	Murray 35'; Morris 70'			Stadium: Fellows Park; Attendance: 5,381

9 November 1968 17	Luton Town	2–0	Swindon Town	Luton
	Sheffield 58'; Lewis 77'			Stadium: Kenilworth Road; Attendance: 17,250

23 November 1968 18	Luton Town	1–1	Bournemouth & Boscombe Athletic	Luton
	Branston 17'		Bumstead 39'	Stadium: Kenilworth Road; Attendance: 14,150

29 November 1968 19	Stockport County	2–0	Luton Town	Stockport
	Goodwin 55'; Atkins 80'			Stadium: Edgeley Park; Attendance: 13,246

14 December 1968 20	Hartlepool	1–0	Luton Town	Hartlepool
	Blowman 11'			Stadium: Victoria Park; Attendance: 3,887

21 December 1968 21	Luton Town	2–0	Plymouth Argyle	Luton
	Lewis 32'; Allen 40'			Stadium: Kenilworth Road; Attendance: 10,971

28 December 1968 22	Northampton Town	0–2	Luton Town	Northampton
			Rioch 7', 21'	Stadium: County Ground; Attendance: 8,227

8 January 1969 23	Shrewsbury Town	3–1	Luton Town	Shrewsbury
	Douglas 43'; Meredith 44' (pen.); Wood 77'		Slough 32'	Stadium: Gay Meadow; Attendance: 4,729

18 January 1969 24	Swindon Town	0–0	Luton Town	Swindon
				Stadium: County Ground; Attendance: 18,909

25 January 1969 25	Luton Town	1–0	Walsall	Luton
	Rioch 4'			Stadium: Kenilworth Road; Attendance: 15,205

29 January 1969 26	Crewe Alexandra	2–0	Luton Town	Crewe
	Stott 50'; Tarbuck 64'			Stadium: Gresty Road; Attendance: 5,053

1 February 1969 27	Luton Town	2–1	Reading	Luton
	Slough 3'; Lewis 41' (pen.)		Yard 76'	Stadium: Kenilworth Road; Attendance: 11,871

8 February 1969 28	Bournemouth & Boscombe Athletic	0–2	Luton Town	Bournemouth
			Sheffield 57'; Jardine 68'	Stadium: Dean Court; Attendance: 9,253

26 February 1969 29	Luton Town	2–0	Crewe Alexandra	Luton
	Slough 43'; Allen 81'			Stadium: Kenilworth Road; Attendance: 13,384

1 March 1969 30	Oldham Athletic	0–1	Luton Town	Oldham
			Lawson 1' (o.g.)	Stadium: Boundary Park; Attendance: 3,946

5 March 1969 31	Luton Town	2–1	Shrewsbury Town	Luton
	Allen 12'; Keen 46'		Harkin 68'	Stadium: Kenilworth Road; Attendance: 14,733

12 March 1969 32	Reading	1–1	Luton Town	Reading
	Silvester 63'		Sheffield 64'	Stadium: Elm Park; Attendance: 6,146

15 March 1969 33	Rotherham United	2–2	Luton Town	Rotherham
	Quinn 36'; Storrie 73'		French 48'; Lewis 65'	Stadium: Millmoor; Attendance: 9,873

19 March 1969 34	Luton Town	3–0	Bristol Rovers	Luton
	Sheffield 2'; Lewis 57'; Allen 85'			Stadium: Kenilworth Road; Attendance: 14,506

22 March 1969 35	Luton Town	1–1	Gillingham	Luton
	Sheffield 82'		Yeo 44'	Stadium: Kenilworth Road; Attendance: 14,562

26 March 1969 36	Luton Town	5–1	Barrow	Luton
	Slough 19'; Rioch 42'; Lewis 44', 78'; Allen 71'		Knox 32'	Stadium: Kenilworth Road; Attendance: 14,244

29 March 1969 37	Luton Town	2–1	Orient	Luton
	Branston 35'; Sheffield 62'		Rofe 38'	Stadium: Kenilworth Road; Attendance: 13,915

31 March 1969 38	Bristol Rovers	0–0	Luton Town	Bristol
				Stadium: Eastville; Attendance: 8,112

4 April 1969 39	Torquay United	1–1	Luton Town	Torquay
	Cave 60'		McDerment 9'	Stadium: Plainmoor; Attendance: 11,427

7 April 1969 40	Mansfield Town	1–0	Luton Town	Mansfield
	Sharkey 51' (pen.)			Stadium: Field Mill; Attendance: 8,681

8 April 1969 41	Luton Town	0–0	Southport	Luton
				Stadium: Kenilworth Road; Attendance: 15,963

12 April 1969 42	Luton Town	3–0	Brighton & Hove Albion	Luton
	French 23'; Lewis 52'; Slough 85'			Stadium: Kenilworth Road; Attendance: 11,965

14 April 1969 43	Southport	1–1	Luton Town	Southport
	Russell 61'		Lewis 55'	Stadium: Haig Avenue; Attendance: 3,392

18 April 1969 44	Tranmere Rovers	0–2	Luton Town	Birkenhead
			Moore 47'; Rioch 54'	Stadium: Prenton Park; Attendance: 6,723

25 April 1969 45	Luton Town	4–1	Stockport County	Luton
	Lewis 6', 61', 80'; Rioch 7'		Young 60' (pen.)	Stadium: Kenilworth Road; Attendance: 12,055

30 April 1969 46	Luton Town	2–1	Watford	Luton
	Buxton 28'; Allen 69'		Scullion 85'	Stadium: Kenilworth Road; Attendance: 25,253

=== League Cup ===
14 August 1968 First Round	Luton Town	3–0	Watford	Luton
	Harrison 8' (pen.), 48'; Lewis 71'			Stadium: Kenilworth Road; Attendance: 20,167

4 September 1968 Second Round	Brighton & Hove Albion	1–1	Luton Town	Hove
	Lawton 62'		Sheffield 38'	Stadium: Goldstone Ground; Attendance: 15,200

11 September 1968 Second Round Replay	Luton Town	4–2	Brighton & Hove Albion	Luton
	Slough 49', 54'; Sheffield 52'; Rioch 72'		Livesey 51'; Napier 86'	Stadium: Kenilworth Road; Attendance: 18,679

24 September 1968 Third Round	Everton	5–1	Luton Town	Liverpool
	Husband 2'; Royle 7', 83' (pen.); Ball 43'; Morrissey 90'		Sheffield 72'	Stadium: Goodison Park; Attendance: 30,405

=== FA Cup ===
16 November 1968 First Round	Luton Town	6–1	Ware	Luton
	Potter 58'; Slough 63', 89'; Allen 71', 74', 81' (pen.)		Francis 86'	Stadium: Kenilworth Road; Attendance: 10,952

7 December 1968 Second Round	Luton Town	3–1	Gillingham	Luton
	French 16'; Harrison 24', 72' (pen.)		Yeo 79' (pen.)	Stadium: Kenilworth Road; Attendance: 12,035

4 January 1969 Third Round	Manchester City	1–0	Luton Town	Manchester
	Lee 26' (pen.)			Stadium: Maine Road; Attendance: 37,120
