= 1970–71 Luton Town F.C. season =

English football club season

Luton Town
1970–71 season
- Chairman: Tony Hunt (until March 1971); Robert Keens
- Manager: Alec Stock
- Stadium: Kenilworth Road
- Division Two: 6th
- League Cup: Third round
- FA Cup: Third round
- Top goalscorer: League: Malcolm Macdonald (24); All: Malcolm Macdonald (30)
- Highest home attendance: 27,023 v Arsenal (League Cup, 6 October 1970)
- Lowest home attendance: 10,205 v Swindon Town (Division Two, 1 May 1971)
- Average home league attendance: 17,307
- Biggest win: 5–1 v Sheffield Wednesday (A), Division Two, 10 October 1970
- Biggest defeat: 0–4 v Millwall (A), Division Two, 10 April 1971

The 1970–71 season was the 85th in the history of Luton Town Football Club. They competed in the Second Division having won promotion from the Third Division the previous season.

Although Luton were promotion contenders for much of the campaign, they ultimately had to settle for a 6th-place finish after only four wins from their last 15 matches and a run of three successive defeats over the Easter weekend.

== Squad ==
Players who made one appearance or more for Luton Town F.C. during the 1970-71 season

Pos.	Nat.	Name	League		League Cup		FA Cup		Total	
Pos.	Nat.	Name	Apps	Goals	Apps	Goals	Apps	Goals	Apps	Goals
GK	ENG	Keith Barber	3	0	0	0	0	0	3	0
GK	ENG	Tony Read	36	0	3	0	2	0	41	0
GK	ENG	Alan Starling	3	0	0	0	0	0	3	0
DF	ENG	Jack Bannister	9(4)	0	0	0	2	0	11(4)	0
DF	ENG	Terry Branston	1	0	0	0	0	0	1	0
DF	ENG	Ken Goodeve	2(2)	0	0	0	0	0	2(2)	0
DF	ENG	Roger Hoy	32	0	2	0	2	0	36	0
DF	SCO	Alan Guild	1	0	1	0	0	0	2	0
DF	SCO	John Moore	35	1	3	0	0	0	38	1
DF	NIR	Chris Nicholl	38	1	3	0	2	0	43	1
DF	ENG	John Ryan	42	1	3	0	2	0	47	1
MF	ENG	Peter Anderson	13(1)	1	0	0	0	0	13(1)	1
MF	ENG	David Court	27	0	3	0	2	0	32	0
MF	ENG	Mike Keen	42	4	3	0	2	0	47	4
MF	SCO	Jimmy Ryan	34(4)	3	2(1)	0	2	0	38(5)	3
MF	ENG	Alan Slough	42	5	3	0	2	0	47	5
FW	ENG	Viv Busby	17(10)	8	0(1)	0	0	0	17(11)	8
FW	ENG	John Collins	1(1)	0	0	0	0	0	1(1)	0
FW	IRE	Don Givens	39(2)	11	3	2	2	0	44(2)	13
FW	ENG	Malcolm Macdonald	42	24	3	2	2	4	47	30
FW	SCO	Matt Tees	3	2	1	0	0	0	4	2

== League table ==
Pos	Team	Pld	W	D	L	GF	GA	GAv	Pts	Qualification or relegation
4	Carlisle United	42	20	13	9	65	43	1.512	53	Qualification for the Watney Cup
5	Hull City	42	19	13	10	54	41	1.317	51	
6	Luton Town	42	18	13	11	62	43	1.442	49	Qualification for the Watney Cup
7	Middlesbrough	42	17	14	11	60	43	1.395	48	
8	Millwall	42	19	9	14	59	42	1.405	47	

Rules for classification: 1) Points; 2) Goal average; 3) Goals scored

== Results ==
=== First Division ===
15 August 1970 1	Bolton Wanderers	4–2	Luton Town	Bolton
	Wharton 18' (pen.), 63', 77' (pen.); Greaves 37'		Keen 26'; Macdonald 89' (pen.)	Stadium: Burnden Park; Attendance: 11,350

22 August 1970 2	Luton Town	0–0	Norwich City	Luton
				Stadium: Kenilworth Road; Attendance: 16,110

29 August 1970 3	Birmingham City	1–1	Luton Town	Birmingham
	Vowden 24'		Macdonald 83' (pen.)	Stadium: St Andrew's; Attendance: 30,141

1 September 1970 4	Luton Town	4–0	Oxford United	Luton
	Tees 11', 39'; Macdonald 24', 57'			Stadium: Kenilworth Road; Attendance: 16,173

5 September 1970 5	Luton Town	1–0	Middlesbrough	Luton
	Givens 16'			Stadium: Kenilworth Road; Attendance: 16,018

12 September 1970 6	Leicester City	1–0	Luton Town	Leicester
	Brown 79'			Stadium: Filbert Street; Attendance: 30,141

19 September 1970 7	Luton Town	4–0	Orient	Luton
	Slough 36', 38'; Macdonald 48', 70'			Stadium: Kenilworth Road; Attendance: 16,711

26 September 1970 8	Swindon Town	0–0	Luton Town	Swindon
				Stadium: County Ground; Attendance: 18,698

29 September 1970 9	Queens Park Rangers	0–1	Luton Town	London
			Keen 2'	Stadium: Loftus Road; Attendance: 19,268

3 October 1970 10	Luton Town	3–0	Bristol City	Luton
	Macdonald 18', 34'; Slough 55'			Stadium: Kenilworth Road; Attendance: 15,992

10 October 1970 11	Sheffield Wednesday	1–5	Luton Town	Sheffield
	Sinclair 68'		Macdonald 14', 45', 81'; Givens 44', 64'	Stadium: Hillsborough; Attendance: 15,189

17 October 1970 12	Luton Town	2–0	Bolton Wanderers	Luton
	Nicholl 9'; Givens 22'			Stadium: Kenilworth Road; Attendance: 19,055

20 October 1970 13	Luton Town	2–0	Blackburn Rovers	Luton
	Givens 1'; Macdonald 72'			Stadium: Kenilworth Road; Attendance: 16,372

24 October 1970 14	Charlton Athletic	1–1	Luton Town	London
	Treacy 86'		Givens 6'	Stadium: The Valley; Attendance: 12,928

31 October 1970 15	Luton Town	1–2	Sunderland	Luton
	Macdonald 78'		Baker 40'; Kerr 83'	Stadium: Kenilworth Road; Attendance: 19,202

7 November 1970 16	Hull City	0–2	Luton Town	Hull
			Givens 11'; Macdonald 28'	Stadium: Boothferry Park; Attendance: 18,343

14 November 1970 17	Luton Town	3–3	Carlisle United	Luton
	Jimmy Ryan 73'; Slough 75'; Macdonald 89'		Hemstead 12'; Balderstone 17'; Martin 55'	Stadium: Kenilworth Road; Attendance: 14,837

21 November 1970 18	Luton Town	2–1	Portsmouth	Luton
	John Ryan 8'; Givens 52'		McCann 9'	Stadium: Kenilworth Road; Attendance: 16,876

28 November 1970 19	Cardiff City	0–0	Luton Town	Cardiff
				Stadium: Ninian Park; Attendance: 26,689

5 December 1970 20	Luton Town	2–1	Sheffield United	Luton
	Macdonald 28'; Jimmy Ryan 47'		Currie 78' (pen.)	Stadium: Kenilworth Road; Attendance: 19,665

12 December 1970 21	Watford	0–1	Luton Town	Watford
			Keen 28'	Stadium: Vicarage Road; Attendance: 24,456

19 December 1970 22	Norwich City	1–1	Luton Town	Norwich
	Foggo 90' (pen.)		Macdonald 13'	Stadium: Carrow Road; Attendance: 17,438

9 January 1971 23	Luton Town	0–0	Queens Park Rangers	Luton
				Stadium: Kenilworth Road; Attendance: 22,024

16 January 1971 24	Blackburn Rovers	1–0	Luton Town	Blackburn
	Russell 70'			Stadium: Ewood Park; Attendance: 8,385

6 February 1971 25	Sheffield United	2–1	Luton Town	Sheffield
	Woodward 47', 65'		Jimmy Ryan 68'	Stadium: Bramall Lane; Attendance: 30,386

13 February 1971 26	Luton Town	1–0	Watford	Luton
	Macdonald 10'			Stadium: Kenilworth Road; Attendance: 20,099

20 February 1971 27	Portsmouth	0–1	Luton Town	Portsmouth
			Givens 44'	Stadium: Fratton Park; Attendance: 13,661

27 February 1971 28	Sunderland	0–0	Luton Town	Sunderland
				Stadium: Roker Park; Attendance: 12,471

6 March 1971 29	Luton Town	1–1	Charlton Athletic	Luton
	Busby 75'		Went 68' (pen.)	Stadium: Kenilworth Road; Attendance: 15,262

13 March 1971 30	Carlisle United	1–0	Luton Town	Carlisle
	Owen 40'			Stadium: Brunton Park; Attendance: 13,681

20 March 1971 31	Luton Town	3–1	Hull City	Luton
	Moore 44'; Busby 74'; Macdonald 80'		Houghton 57'	Stadium: Kenilworth Road; Attendance: 19,566

27 March 1971 32	Middlesbrough	2–1	Luton Town	Middlesbrough
	McIlmoyle 70', 80'		Macdonald 13'	Stadium: Ayresome Park; Attendance: 19,579

30 March 1971 33	Luton Town	1–1	Millwall	Luton
	Keen 30'		Brown 87'	Stadium: Kenilworth Road; Attendance: 17,578

3 April 1971 34	Luton Town	3–2	Birmingham City	Luton
	Busby 36', 43'; Slough 48'		Latchford 5'; Summerill 22'	Stadium: Kenilworth Road; Attendance: 25,172

9 April 1971 35	Bristol City	3–2	Luton Town	Bristol
	Rooks 60'; Garland 65', 66'		Busby 22'; Macdonald 42'	Stadium: Ashton Gate; Attendance: 18,846

10 April 1971 36	Millwall	4–0	Luton Town	London
	Possee 19', 32'; Bridges 25'; Brown 81'			Stadium: The Den; Attendance: 13,864

12 April 1971 37	Luton Town	1–3	Leicester City	Luton
	Sjoberg 2' (o.g.)		Manley 37'; Farrington 61'; Brown 65'	Stadium: Kenilworth Road; Attendance: 24,405

17 April 1971 38	Luton Town	2–2	Sheffield Wednesday	Luton
	Anderson 2'; Givens 52'		Sinclair 32'; Sunley 55'	Stadium: Kenilworth Road; Attendance: 12,308

24 April 1971 39	Orient	1–2	Luton Town	London
	Brabrook 90'		Busby 34', 89'	Stadium: Brisbane Road; Attendance: 6,339

28 April 1971 40	Oxford United	2–1	Luton Town	Oxford
	Clarke 5'; Cassidy 25'		Busby 44'	Stadium: Manor Ground; Attendance: 9,531

1 May 1971 41	Luton Town	1–1	Swindon Town	Luton
	Givens 44' (pen.)		Jones 58'	Stadium: Kenilworth Road; Attendance: 10,205

4 May 1971 42	Luton Town	3–0	Cardiff City	Luton
	Macdonald 20', 82', 89'			Stadium: Kenilworth Road; Attendance: 10,784

=== League Cup ===
19 August 1970 First Round	Gillingham	0–1	Luton Town	Gillingham
			Macdonald 32'	Stadium: Priestfield; Attendance: 7,328

8 September 1970 Second Round	Luton Town	3–0	Workington	Luton
	Givens 9', 77'; Macdonald 50'			Stadium: Kenilworth Road; Attendance: 11,072

6 October 1970 Third Round	Luton Town	0–1	Arsenal	Luton
			Graham 26'	Stadium: Kenilworth Road; Attendance: 27,023

=== FA Cup ===
2 January 1971 Third Round	Nottingham Forest	1–1	Luton Town	West Bridgford
	McIntosh 18'		Macdonald 70'	Stadium: City Ground; Attendance: 23,230

11 January 1971 Third Round Replay	Luton Town	3–4	Nottingham Forest	Luton
	Macdonald 20', 67' (pen.), 84'		Cormack 17'; Collier 65'; Richardson 66'; Rees 87'	Stadium: Kenilworth Road; Attendance: 23,483
