= Ian Buxton =

English footballer and cricketer (1938–2010)

Personal information
- Full name: Ian Ray Buxton
- Date of birth: 17 April 1938
- Place of birth: Cromford, England
- Date of death: 1 October 2010 (aged 72)
- Place of death: Matlock, England
- Position: Inside forward

Senior career*
Years	Team	Apps	(Gls)
1959–1967	Derby County	145	(41)
1967–1969	Luton Town	48	(14)
1969	Notts County	5	(1)
1969–1970	Port Vale	18	(6)
- Ilkeston Town
Total		216+	(62+)
- * Club domestic league appearances and goals

Ian Ray Buxton (17 April 1938 – 1 October 2010) was an English footballer and cricketer. He played football as an inside forward for Derby County between 1959 and 1967, before brief spells with Luton Town, Notts County, Port Vale, and non-League Ilkeston Town. He played a total of 215 league games in the English Football League, helping Luton Town to the Fourth Division title in 1967–68, also helping Port Vale to win promotion out of the Fourth Division in 1969–70. He also played cricket for Derbyshire from 1959 to 1973, serving the county as captain between 1970 and 1972.

== Football career ==
=== Derby County ===
Buxton started his career at Derby County, helping them to an 18th-place finish in the Second Division in 1959–60. Making his debut under Harry Storer, he scored twice in a 3–1 home win over Ipswich Town. He proved to be "adept at holding the ball and bringing others into play." The "Rams" then rose to 12th in 1960–61, before dropping to 16th in 1961–62. Derby finished 18th again 1962–63 under new boss Tim Ward, just five points ahead of relegated Walsall. They rallied to 13th in 1963–64, before posting ninth and eighth-place finishes in 1964–65 and 1965–66. Derby then dropped to 17th in 1966–67, just six points above relegated Northampton Town. However, manager Brian Clough was not comfortable with a player splitting his loyalties between football and cricket, and so he moved Buxton on.

=== Luton Town ===
He signed with Allan Brown's Luton Town for an £11,000 fee in September 1967. He helped the Kenilworth Road side to the Fourth Division title in 1967–68, scoring 13 goals from 36 starts. Alec Stock then led the club to a third-place finish in the Third Division in 1968–69, just three points behind promoted Swindon Town.

=== Later career ===
He signed with Notts County of the Fourth Division for the 1969–70 campaign, but played just five games at Meadow Lane. In a three-month arrangement, he joined Port Vale in December 1969. He scored on his debut at inside-left, a 1–0 win over Oldham Athletic at Vale Park on 13 December, and was a regular throughout the rest of the club's 1969–70 promotion winning side. The club paid the £500 registration fee to sign him permanently, knowing that his cricket commitments meant he missed the last four games anyway. However, he retired from football at the end of that season to focus on his cricket. He scored six goals in 18 games for Gordon Lee's "Valiants". He soon came out of retirement though, joining Ilkeston Town in July 1970.

== Cricket career ==
Ian Buxton
Cricket information
- Batting: Right-handed
- Bowling: Right arm medium pace
- Role: All-rounder

Domestic team information
- Years: Team
- 1959–1973: Derbyshire
- First-class debut: 14 July 1959 Derbyshire v Yorkshire
- Last First-class: 8 September 1973 Derbyshire v Nottinghamshire
- List A debut: 22 May 1963 Derbyshire v Hampshire
- Last List A: 9 September 1973 Derbyshire v Nottinghamshire

Career statistics
Competition	FC	LA
Matches	350	99
Runs scored	11803	1897
Batting average	23.94	24.32
100s/50s	5/50	0/8
Top score	118*	81
Balls bowled	33414	3909
Wickets	483	104
Bowling average	26.38	23.20
5 wickets in innings	12	1
10 wickets in match	2	0
Best bowling	7/33	5/19
Catches/stumpings	199/0	28/0
- Source: CricketArchive, 19 October 2009

Buxton's career with Derbyshire started in the Second XI in the 1959 season. Later in the same season, he played his debut match against Yorkshire, taking three wickets. He took his first five-wicket haul during the season, as Derbyshire finished in a promising seventh place in the championship.

Though his averages were somewhat down in the following season, it was his first of two ten-wicket hauls in 1961 which truly brought him to the attention of the selectors, as he finished with match figures of 10/104 against Warwickshire. Buxton was a first-choice player in the team over the next four seasons when he posted one more ten-wicket match against Worcestershire in June 1968.

Buxton was captain of Derbyshire between 1970 and 1972. He was a right-handed batsman and a right-arm medium-pace bowler. He was a consistent middle-order batsman whose skill with the ball helped him to gain a first-team place and, between 1970 and 1972, the Derbyshire club captaincy. He played 350 first-class matches with the Derbyshire first team before retiring in 1973.

== Later life and death ==
He made a cricket comeback some 20 years after retiring from playing, serving on the committee for several years during the 1990s. He was married to Doreen and had two children as well as five grandchildren. He died, aged 72, at his Matlock home on 1 October 2010.

== Career statistics ==
Appearances and goals by club, season and competition
Club	Season	League			FA Cup		Other		Total	
Club	Season	Division	Apps	Goals	Apps	Goals	Apps	Goals	Apps	Goals
Derby County	1959–60	Second Division	5	4	0	0	0	0	5	4
Derby County	1960–61	Second Division	1	0	0	0	1	1	2	1
Derby County	1961–62	Second Division	2	0	0	0	0	0	2	0
Derby County	1962–63	Second Division	9	2	0	0	2	0	11	2
Derby County	1963–64	Second Division	16	4	0	0	1	0	17	4
Derby County	1964–65	Second Division	40	8	0	0	1	0	41	8
Derby County	1965–66	Second Division	36	12	1	0	4	1	41	13
Derby County	1966–67	Second Division	35	10	1	0	1	0	37	10
Derby County	1967–68	Second Division	1	1	0	0	1	0	2	1
Derby County	Total		145	41	2	0	11	2	158	43
Luton Town	1967–68	Fourth Division	36	13	2	1	0	0	38	14
Luton Town	1968–69	Third Division	12	1	1	0	1	0	14	1
Luton Town	Total		48	14	3	1	1	0	52	15
Notts County	1969–70	Fourth Division	5	1	1	0	0	0	6	1
Port Vale	1969–70	Fourth Division	18	6	0	0	0	0	18	6
Career total			216	62	6	1	12	2	234	65

== Honours ==
Luton Town

- Football League Fourth Division: 1967–68

Port Vale

- Football League Fourth Division fourth-place promotion: 1969–70

Sporting positions
Preceded by Derek Morgan	Derbyshire cricket captains 1970–1972	Succeeded by Brian Bolus
