= 1973–74 FA Cup =

Association football tournament

Tournament details
- Country: England; Wales

Final positions
- Champions: Liverpool (2nd title)
- Runners-up: Newcastle United
- Third place: Burnley
- Fourth place: Leicester City

Tournament statistics
- Top goal scorer: Malcolm Macdonald (7)

The 1973–74 FA Cup was the 93rd edition of the world's oldest football cup competition, the Football Association Challenge Cup, commonly known as the FA Cup. Liverpool won the competition for only the second time, defeating Newcastle United 3–0 in the final at Wembley, London.

Matches were scheduled to be played at the stadium of the team named first on the date specified for each round. This date was always a Saturday, but some matches would be rescheduled for other days. This might occur if the tie clashed with a game at a neighbouring stadium, or if the weather was inclement. In the 1973–74 season, matches were allowed to be played on Sundays for the first time.

If scores were level after 90 minutes had been played, a replay would take place at the stadium of the second-named team later the same week. If scores in the replayed match were also level after 90 minutes, a 30-minute period of extra time was played. If the result after extra time was a draw, further replays would be held until a winner was determined.

== Calendar ==
| Round | Date |
|---|---|
| Preliminary round | Saturday 1 September 1973 |
| First round qualifying | Saturday 15 September 1973 |
| Second round qualifying | Saturday 6 October 1973 |
| Third round qualifying | Saturday 20 October 1973 |
| Fourth round qualifying | Saturday 3 November 1973 |
| First round proper | Saturday 24 November 1973 |
| Second round proper | Saturday 15 December 1973 |
| Third round proper | Saturday 5 January 1974 |
| Fourth round proper | Saturday 26 January 1974 |
| Fifth round proper | Saturday 16 February 1974 |
| Sixth round proper | Saturday 9 March 1974 |
| Semi-finals | Saturday 30 March 1974 |
| Final | Saturday 4 May 1974 |

== Qualifying rounds ==
Most participating clubs that were not members of the Football League competed in the qualifying rounds to secure one of 28 places available in the first round.

The winners from the fourth qualifying round were South Shields, Willington, Blyth Spartans, Altrincham, Runcorn, Formby, Merthyr Tydfil, Frickley Colliery, Telford United, Banbury United, Grantham, Alfreton Town, King's Lynn, Boston United, Alvechurch, Chelmsford City, Hillingdon Borough, Dagenham, Hayes, Boreham Wood, Leytonstone, Hendon, Guildford City, Wimbledon, Hitchin Town, Wycombe Wanderers, Bideford and Weymouth.

Formby and Boreham Wood were appearing in the competition proper for the first time. Of the others, Merthyr Tydfil had not featured at this stage since 1965–66, Bideford had not done so since 1964–65, Hitchin Town had not done so since 1960–61 and Willington had not done so since 1950–51.

Alvechurch participated in seven rounds of this season's tournament, defeating Halesowen Town, Bromsgrove Rovers, Stourbridge, Stafford Rangers, Exeter City and King's Lynn before going out in the third round to Bradford City at Valley Parade. However the club entered period of decline in subsequent seasons – this would be their last appearance in the FA Cup competition proper until 2022–23.

== First round proper ==
At this stage the 48 clubs from the Football League Third and Fourth Divisions joined the non-league clubs who came through the qualifying rounds. To complete the round, four more non-league clubs were given byes to this stage. Scarborough and Wigan Athletic were the finalists from the previous season's FA Trophy while Walton & Hersham and Slough Town were the finalists from the previous season's FA Amateur Cup.

Matches were scheduled to be played on Saturday, 24 November 1973. Ten matches were drawn and went to replays.

| Tie no | Home team | Score | Away team | Date |
|---|---|---|---|---|
| 1 | Chester | 1–0 | Telford United | 24 November 1973 |
| 2 | Chesterfield | 0–0 | Barnsley | 24 November 1973 |
| Replay | Barnsley | 2–1 | Chesterfield | 28 November 1973 |
| 3 | AFC Bournemouth | 1–0 | Charlton Athletic | 24 November 1973 |
| 4 | Banbury United | 0–0 | Northampton Town | 24 November 1973 |
| Replay | Northampton Town | 3–2 | Banbury United | 29 November 1973 |
| 5 | Rochdale | 2–0 | South Shields | 24 November 1973 |
| 6 | Watford | 1–0 | Chelmsford City | 24 November 1973 |
| 7 | Weymouth | 0–1 | Merthyr Tydfil | 24 November 1973 |
| 8 | Reading | 3–0 | Slough Town | 24 November 1973 |
| 9 | Walsall | 1–0 | Swansea City | 24 November 1973 |
| 10 | Crewe Alexandra | 0–0 | Scarborough | 24 November 1973 |
| Replay | Scarborough | 2–1 | Crewe Alexandra | 28 November 1973 |
| 11 | Doncaster Rovers | 1–0 | Lincoln City | 24 November 1973 |
| 12 | Wrexham | 1–1 | Shrewsbury Town | 24 November 1973 |
| Replay | Shrewsbury Town | 0–1 | Wrexham | 27 November 1973 |
| 13 | Tranmere Rovers | 2–1 | Bury | 24 November 1973 |
| 14 | Stockport County | 0–1 | Port Vale | 24 November 1973 |
| 15 | Wycombe Wanderers | 3–1 | Newport County | 24 November 1973 |
| 16 | King's Lynn | 1–0 | Wimbledon | 24 November 1973 |
| 17 | Plymouth Argyle | 2–1 | Brentford | 24 November 1973 |
| 18 | Bradford City | 2–0 | Workington | 24 November 1973 |
| 19 | Hitchin Town | 1–1 | Guildford City | 24 November 1973 |
| Replay | Guildford City | 1–4 | Hitchin Town | 28 November 1973 |
| 20 | Altrincham | 2–0 | Hartlepool | 24 November 1973 |
| 21 | Southend United | 3–0 | Boreham Wood | 24 November 1973 |
| 22 | Exeter City | 0–1 | Alvechurch | 24 November 1973 |
| 23 | Scunthorpe United | 1–0 | Darlington | 24 November 1973 |
| 24 | Huddersfield Town | 2–0 | Wigan Athletic | 24 November 1973 |
| 25 | Alfreton Town | 0–0 | Blyth Spartans | 24 November 1973 |
| Replay | Blyth Spartans | 2–1 | Alfreton Town | 28 November 1973 |
| 26 | Willington | 0–0 | Blackburn Rovers | 24 November 1973 |
| Replay | Blackburn Rovers | 6–1 | Willington | 3 December 1973 |
| 27 | Halifax Town | 6–1 | Frickley Colliery | 24 November 1973 |
| 28 | Runcorn | 0–1 | Grimsby Town | 24 November 1973 |
| 29 | York City | 0–0 | Mansfield Town | 24 November 1973 |
| Replay | Mansfield Town | 5–3 | York City | 10 December 1973 |
| 30 | Hereford United | 3–1 | Torquay United | 24 November 1973 |
| 31 | Rotherham United | 2–1 | Southport | 24 November 1973 |
| 32 | Bideford | 0–2 | Bristol Rovers | 24 November 1973 |
| 33 | Boston United | 0–0 | Hayes | 24 November 1973 |
| Replay | Hayes | 1–2 | Boston United | 28 November 1973 |
| 34 | Formby | 0–2 | Oldham Athletic | 24 November 1973 |
| 35 | Colchester United | 2–3 | Peterborough United | 24 November 1973 |
| 36 | Walton & Hersham | 0–0 | Brighton & Hove Albion | 24 November 1973 |
| Replay | Brighton & Hove Albion | 0–4 | Walton & Hersham | 28 November 1973 |
| 37 | Hendon | 3–0 | Leytonstone | 24 November 1973 |
| 38 | Dagenham | 0–4 | Aldershot | 24 November 1973 |
| 39 | Cambridge United | 3–2 | Gillingham | 24 November 1973 |
| 40 | Hillingdon Borough | 0–4 | Grantham | 24 November 1973 |

== Second round proper ==
The matches were scheduled for Saturday, 15 December 1973. Five matches were drawn, with replays taking place later the same week.

| Tie no | Home team | Score | Away team | Date |
|---|---|---|---|---|
| 1 | Chester | 3–2 | Huddersfield Town | 15 December 1973 |
| 2 | Alvechurch | 6–1 | King's Lynn | 15 December 1973 |
| 3 | Grantham | 1–1 | Rochdale | 15 December 1973 |
| Replay | Rochdale | 3–5 | Grantham | 18 December 1973 |
| 4 | Watford | 0–1 | AFC Bournemouth | 15 December 1973 |
| 5 | Blackburn Rovers | 0–0 | Altrincham | 15 December 1973 |
| Replay | Altrincham | 0–2 | Blackburn Rovers | 19 December 1973 |
| 6 | Grimsby Town | 1–1 | Blyth Spartans | 15 December 1973 |
| Replay | Blyth Spartans | 0–2 | Grimsby Town | 19 December 1973 |
| 7 | Doncaster Rovers | 3–0 | Tranmere Rovers | 15 December 1973 |
| 8 | Wrexham | 3–0 | Rotherham United | 15 December 1973 |
| 9 | Wycombe Wanderers | 1–3 | Peterborough United | 15 December 1973 |
| 10 | Barnsley | 1–1 | Bradford City | 15 December 1973 |
| Replay | Bradford City | 2–1 | Barnsley | 19 December 1973 |
| 11 | Northampton Town | 1–2 | Bristol Rovers | 15 December 1973 |
| 12 | Plymouth Argyle | 1–0 | Walsall | 15 December 1973 |
| 13 | Southend United | 2–0 | Reading | 15 December 1973 |
| 14 | Mansfield Town | 1–1 | Scunthorpe United | 15 December 1973 |
| Replay | Scunthorpe United | 1–0 | Mansfield Town | 18 December 1973 |
| 15 | Port Vale | 2–1 | Scarborough | 15 December 1973 |
| 16 | Halifax Town | 0–1 | Oldham Athletic | 15 December 1973 |
| 17 | Hereford United | 3–0 | Walton & Hersham | 15 December 1973 |
| 18 | Aldershot | 1–2 | Cambridge United | 15 December 1973 |
| 19 | Boston United | 1–0 | Hitchin Town | 15 December 1973 |
| 20 | Merthyr Tydfil | 0–3 | Hendon | 15 December 1973 |

== Third round proper ==
The 44 First and Second Division clubs entered the competition at this stage. The matches were scheduled for the weekend of 5–6 January 1974. Thirteen matches were drawn and went to replays, while Oldham Athletic and Cambridge United required a second replay which was played at the City Ground in Nottingham.

Holders Sunderland were eliminated by Carlisle United. Alvechurch, Grantham, Boston United and Hendon were the last non-league clubs left in the competition.

| Tie no | Home team | Score | Away team | Date |
|---|---|---|---|---|
| 1 | Bristol City | 1–1 | Hull City | 5 January 1974 |
| Replay | Hull City | 0–1 | Bristol City | 8 January 1974 |
| 2 | Grantham | 0–2 | Middlesbrough | 5 January 1974 |
| 3 | Liverpool | 2–2 | Doncaster Rovers | 5 January 1974 |
| Replay | Doncaster Rovers | 0–2 | Liverpool | 8 January 1974 |
| 4 | Southampton | 2–1 | Blackpool | 5 January 1974 |
| 5 | Leicester City | 1–0 | Tottenham Hotspur | 5 January 1974 |
| 6 | Nottingham Forest | 4–3 | Bristol Rovers | 6 January 1974 |
| 7 | Aston Villa | 3–1 | Chester | 5 January 1974 |
| 8 | Sheffield Wednesday | 0–0 | Coventry City | 5 January 1974 |
| Replay | Coventry City | 3–1 | Sheffield Wednesday | 8 January 1974 |
| 9 | Bolton Wanderers | 3–2 | Stoke City | 6 January 1974 |
| 10 | Grimsby Town | 0–2 | Burnley | 5 January 1974 |
| 11 | Wolverhampton Wanderers | 1–1 | Leeds United | 5 January 1974 |
| Replay | Leeds United | 1–0 | Wolverhampton Wanderers | 9 January 1974 |
| 12 | West Bromwich Albion | 4–0 | Notts County | 5 January 1974 |
| 13 | Derby County | 0–0 | Boston United | 5 January 1974 |
| Replay | Boston United | 1–6 | Derby County | 9 January 1974 |
| 14 | Everton | 3–0 | Blackburn Rovers | 5 January 1974 |
| 15 | Ipswich Town | 3–2 | Sheffield United | 5 January 1974 |
| 16 | Newcastle United | 1–1 | Hendon | 5 January 1974 |
| Replay | Hendon | 0–4 | Newcastle United | 9 January 1974 |
| 17 | Fulham | 1–0 | Preston North End | 5 January 1974 |
| 18 | Portsmouth | 3–3 | Swindon Town | 5 January 1974 |
| Replay | Swindon Town | 0–1 | Portsmouth | 9 January 1974 |
| 19 | West Ham United | 1–1 | Hereford United | 5 January 1974 |
| Replay | Hereford United | 2–1 | West Ham United | 9 January 1974 |
| 20 | Manchester United | 1–0 | Plymouth Argyle | 5 January 1974 |
| 21 | Norwich City | 0–1 | Arsenal | 5 January 1974 |
| 22 | Bradford City | 4–2 | Alvechurch | 6 January 1974 |
| 23 | Millwall | 1–1 | Scunthorpe United | 5 January 1974 |
| Replay | Scunthorpe United | 1–0 | Millwall | 8 January 1974 |
| 24 | Carlisle United | 0–0 | Sunderland | 5 January 1974 |
| Replay | Sunderland | 0–1 | Carlisle United | 9 January 1974 |
| 25 | Crystal Palace | 0–2 | Wrexham | 5 January 1974 |
| 26 | Chelsea | 0–0 | Queens Park Rangers | 5 January 1974 |
| Replay | Queens Park Rangers | 1–0 | Chelsea | 15 January 1974 |
| 27 | Port Vale | 1–1 | Luton Town | 5 January 1974 |
| Replay | Luton Town | 4–2 | Port Vale | 9 January 1974 |
| 28 | Peterborough United | 3–1 | Southend United | 5 January 1974 |
| 29 | Birmingham City | 5–2 | Cardiff City | 5 January 1974 |
| 30 | Cambridge United | 2–2 | Oldham Athletic | 6 January 1974 |
| Replay | Oldham Athletic | 3–3 | Cambridge United | 8 January 1974 |
| Replay | Cambridge United | 1–2 | Oldham Athletic | 14 January 1974 |
| 31 | Oxford United | 2–5 | Manchester City | 5 January 1974 |
| 32 | Orient | 2–1 | AFC Bournemouth | 5 January 1974 |

== Fourth round proper ==
The matches were scheduled for Saturday, 26 January 1974. Four matches were, however, played the day after. Eight matches were drawn, of which one, the tie between Portsmouth and Leyton Orient, required a second replay.

| Tie no | Home team | Score | Away team | Date |
|---|---|---|---|---|
| 1 | Liverpool | 0–0 | Carlisle United | 26 January 1974 |
| Replay | Carlisle United | 0–2 | Liverpool | 29 January 1974 |
| 2 | Southampton | 3–3 | Bolton Wanderers | 26 January 1974 |
| Replay | Bolton Wanderers | 0–2 | Southampton | 30 January 1974 |
| 3 | Nottingham Forest | 4–1 | Manchester City | 27 January 1974 |
| 4 | Luton Town | 3–0 | Bradford City | 26 January 1974 |
| 5 | Everton | 0–0 | West Bromwich Albion | 27 January 1974 |
| Replay | West Bromwich Albion | 1–0 | Everton | 30 January 1974 |
| 6 | Wrexham | 1–0 | Middlesbrough | 26 January 1974 |
| 7 | Newcastle United | 1–1 | Scunthorpe United | 26 January 1974 |
| Replay | Scunthorpe United | 0–3 | Newcastle United | 30 January 1974 |
| 8 | Queens Park Rangers | 2–0 | Birmingham City | 26 January 1974 |
| 9 | Fulham | 1–1 | Leicester City | 26 January 1974 |
| Replay | Leicester City | 2–1 | Fulham | 30 January 1974 |
| 10 | Coventry City | 0–0 | Derby County | 27 January 1974 |
| Replay | Derby County | 0–1 | Coventry City | 30 January 1974 |
| 11 | Portsmouth | 0–0 | Orient | 27 January 1974 |
| Replay | Orient | 1–1 | Portsmouth | 29 January 1974 |
| Replay | Portsmouth | 2–0 | Orient | 5 February 1974 |
| 12 | Manchester United | 0–1 | Ipswich Town | 26 January 1974 |
| 13 | Oldham Athletic | 1–4 | Burnley | 26 January 1974 |
| 14 | Arsenal | 1–1 | Aston Villa | 26 January 1974 |
| Replay | Aston Villa | 2–0 | Arsenal | 30 January 1974 |
| 15 | Hereford United | 0–1 | Bristol City | 26 January 1974 |
| 16 | Peterborough United | 1–4 | Leeds United | 26 January 1974 |

== Fifth round proper ==
The matches were scheduled for Saturday, 16 February 1974 with one taking place the day after. Two matches were drawn and went to replays.

| Tie no | Home team | Score | Away team | Date |
|---|---|---|---|---|
| 1 | Bristol City | 1–1 | Leeds United | 16 February 1974 |
| Replay | Leeds United | 0–1 | Bristol City | 19 February 1974 |
| 2 | Burnley | 1–0 | Aston Villa | 16 February 1974 |
| 3 | Liverpool | 2–0 | Ipswich Town | 16 February 1974 |
| 4 | Southampton | 0–1 | Wrexham | 16 February 1974 |
| 5 | Nottingham Forest | 1–0 | Portsmouth | 17 February 1974 |
| 6 | West Bromwich Albion | 0–3 | Newcastle United | 16 February 1974 |
| 7 | Luton Town | 0–4 | Leicester City | 16 February 1974 |
| 8 | Coventry City | 0–0 | Queens Park Rangers | 16 February 1974 |
| Replay | Queens Park Rangers | 3–2 | Coventry City | 19 February 1974 |

== Sixth round proper ==
The four quarter-final ties were played on 9 March 1974.

=== Newcastle United pitch invasion ===
The first Newcastle United–Nottingham Forest game at St James' Park was won 4–3 by Newcastle. However, early in the second half Nottingham Forest went 3–1 up from a penalty awarded by the referee, Gordon Kew, who also sent off Newcastle's defender Pat Howard for protesting the decision. The Newcastle United fans in the Leazes End of the ground (now the Sir John Hall stand) invaded the pitch. Two Nottingham Forest players were injured in the debacle, but the referee waited until all players were recovered and received the permission of both managers to continue the tie. Newcastle managed to come back and win with a late goal by their captain, Bobby Moncur, in spite of the two-goal and one-player deficit. Up to 23 people were taken to hospital as a result of the pitch invasion, of whom two had fractured skulls; another 103 people were treated at the ground and 39 arrests were made.

Following the riot, a written protest was sent from Nottingham Forest to the FA on 11 March. In response, the secretary of the FA, Ted Croker, announced that a special four-man subcommittee of the Challenge Cup Committee who oversee the FA Cup competition were to investigate the incident, stating, "Newcastle could be disqualified. We do not have the power to order a replay as the game was completed." On 14 March the subcommittee ruled that, in spite of Mr. Croker's comments, the match was to be replayed, at the neutral venue of Goodison Park on Monday 18 March. If that match was drawn then extra time would be played and, if needed, another match at a neutral venue would be played the following Thursday. This decision was unprecedented at the time and the reaction was mixed, with Newcastle's defender Frank Clark suggesting that their comeback should have allowed them to go through outright. The Nottingham Forest captain Bob Chapman stated, "we would have won it fair and square but for the trouble."

The first replay was a nervous 0–0 draw after extra time, although Newcastle hit the woodwork three times. Newcastle finally won the tie through a single Malcolm Macdonald goal in the second replay, also at Goodison Park.

=== Results ===
| Tie no | Home team | Score | Away team | Date |
|---|---|---|---|---|
| 1 | Bristol City | 0–1 | Liverpool | 9 March 1974 |
| 2 | Burnley | 1–0 | Wrexham | 9 March 1974 |
| 3 | Newcastle United | 4–3 (Match void) | Nottingham Forest | 9 March 1974 |
| Replay | Newcastle United | 0–0 | Nottingham Forest | 18 March 1974 |
| Replay | Newcastle United | 1–0 | Nottingham Forest | 21 March 1974 |
| 4 | Queens Park Rangers | 0–2 | Leicester City | 9 March 1974 |

== Semi-finals ==
The semi-final matches were played on Saturday, 30 March 1974 with the Liverpool–Leicester City game being replayed four days later. Liverpool and Newcastle United won their respective matches to go on to the final at Wembley.

30 March 1974
15:00

| Liverpool | 0–0 | Leicester City |
|---|---|---|
| | Report |

Old Trafford, Manchester
Referee: Ken Burns, Stourbridge
30 March 1974
15:00

| Newcastle United | 2–0 | Burnley |
|---|---|---|
| Macdonald 65', 75' | Report |

Hillsborough Stadium, Sheffield
Referee: Gordon Hill, Leicester

=== Replay ===
3 April 1974
19:30

| Leicester City | 1–3 | Liverpool |
|---|---|---|
| Glover 49' | Report | Hall 46'; Keegan 61'; Toshack 86' |

Villa Park, Birmingham
Referee: Ken Burns, Stourbridge

=== Third place playoff ===
Between 1970 and 1974, a third place playoff between the two losing semi-finalists was held.

9 May 1974

| Leicester City | 0–1 | Burnley |
|---|---|---|
| | | Hankin |

Filbert Street, Leicester
Attendance: 4,432

== Final ==
The final took place on Saturday, 4 May 1974 at Wembley and ended in a victory for Liverpool over Newcastle United by three goals to nil. Two goals were scored by Kevin Keegan and one by Steve Heighway. The attendance was 100,000.

4 May 1974
15:00 BST

| Liverpool | 3–0 | Newcastle United |
|---|---|---|
| Keegan 57', 88'; Heighway 74' | Report |

Wembley, London
Attendance: 100,000
Referee: Gordon Kew

| Liverpool | Newcastle |

== TV coverage ==
The right to show FA Cup games were, as with Football League matches, shared between the BBC and ITV networks. All games were shown in a highlights format, except the final, which was shown live both on BBC1 & ITV. The BBC football highlights programme Match Of The Day would show up to three games. The various ITV regional network stations would cover one game each, and show highlights from other games covered elsewhere on the ITV network. No games from rounds 1 or 2 were shown.

=== Burnley ===
Burnley banned TV coverage of their 5th round tie with Aston Villa, which was due to be one of the ITV televised ties shown by Granada. Burnley also banned coverage of their quarter-final tie with Wrexham, which was due to be shown on the BBC's Match Of The Day. A league game was shown instead, between Derby County and West Ham United, as well as the Queens Park Rangers v Leicester quarter-final. Burnley's chairman Bob Lord also tried to stop the semi-final being covered by ITV, but he failed as the game was played at Hillsborough, a neutral venue.

=== Third round ===
BBC featured Wolverhampton Wanderers v Leeds United, West Ham United v Hereford United, Manchester United v Plymouth Argyle, Hendon v Newcastle United (midweek replay played at Watford), and Hereford United v West Ham United (midweek replay).

ITV's regions showed Chelsea v Queens Park Rangers (LWT), Everton v Blackburn Rovers (Granada), Leicester City v Tottenham Hotspur (ATV), Sheffield Wednesday v Coventry City (Yorkshire), Newcastle United v Hendon (Tyne-Tees), and Peterborough United v Southend United (Anglia).

=== Fourth round ===
BBC: Queens Park Rangers v Birmingham City, Fulham v Leicester City, and Manchester United v Ipswich Town.

ITV: Arsenal v Aston Villa (LWT & ATV), Peterborough United v Leeds United (Anglia & Yorkshire), Liverpool v Carlisle United (Granada), Newcastle United v Scunthorpe United (Tyne-Tees), and Aston Villa v Arsenal (midweek replay shown in all regions).

=== Fifth round ===
BBC: Bristol City v Leeds United, West Bromwich Albion v Newcastle United, Liverpool v Ipswich Town.

ITV: Luton Town v Leicester City (LWT & Anglia), Southampton v Wrexham (Southern & HTV), Coventry City v Queens Park Rangers (ATV), and Leeds United v Bristol City (midweek replay shown in all regions).

=== Sixth round ===
BBC: Queens Park Rangers v Leicester City.

ITV: Bristol City v Liverpool (LWT, HTV & Granada), Newcastle United v Nottingham Forest (Tyne-Tees & ATV), Newcastle United v Nottingham Forest (midweek rematch & replay shown in all regions).

=== Semi-finals ===
BBC: Leicester City v Liverpool (and midweek replay).

ITV: Burnley v Newcastle United (all regions).

=== Final ===
Liverpool v Newcastle United: shown live on BBC and on all ITV regions.
