= Roy Low =

English footballer

Personal information
- Full name: Anthony Roy Low
- Date of birth: 8 July 1944 (age 82)
- Place of birth: Watford, England
- Position: Winger

Senior career*
Years	Team	Apps	(Gls)
1961–1967	Tottenham Hotspur	8	(1)
1967–1968	Watford	26	(4)
- Bedford Town
- * Club domestic league appearances and goals

Anthony Roy Low (born 8 July 1944 in Watford) is an English former professional footballer who played for Tottenham Hotspur, Watford, Bedford Town and represented England at schoolboy level.

== Playing career ==
Having played for England schoolboys in 1959, Low joined Tottenham Hotspur as a junior in July 1961. He went on to make eight appearances and scored one goal. The winger became the first Spurs player to make a substitute appearance when he replaced Derek Possee in a home fixture against Arsenal on 11 September 1965. In February 1967 Low signed for Watford and played in a further 26 first team matches and found the net on four occasions. After leaving Vicarage Road he went on to play for Bedford Town where he ended his senior career.
