= Viv Busby =

English footballer and manager (1949–2024)

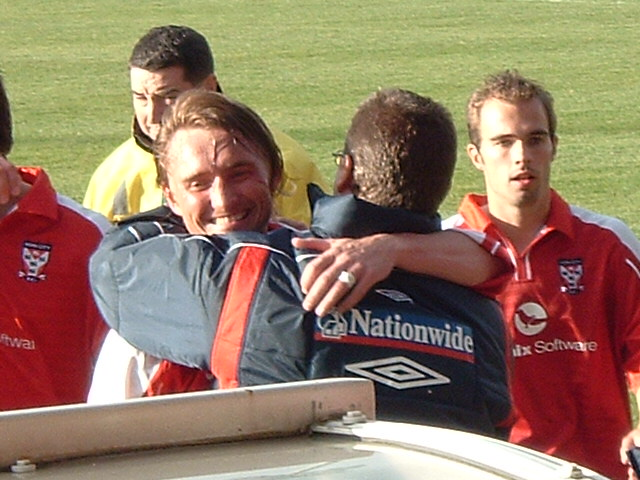
- Chris Brass hugs Busby after a game in 2004

Personal information
- Full name: Vivian Dennis Busby
- Date of birth: 19 June 1949
- Place of birth: Slough, England
- Date of death: 8 May 2024 (aged 74)
- Height: 5 ft 11 1/2 in (1.82 m)
- Position: Striker

Senior career*
Years	Team	Apps	(Gls)
1966–1970	Wycombe Wanderers	50	(19)
1970–1973	Luton Town	77	(16)
1971–1972	→ Newcastle United (loan)	4	(2)
1973–1976	Fulham	118	(29)
1976–1977	Norwich City	22	(11)
1977–1980	Stoke City	50	(10)
1980	→ Sheffield United (loan)	3	(1)
1980–1981	Tulsa Roughnecks	19	(1)
1981–1982	Blackburn Rovers	8	(1)
1982–1983	York City	19	(4)
Total		370	(94)

Managerial career
- 1993: Hartlepool United
- 2004–2005: York City (caretaker)
- * Club domestic league appearances and goals

Vivian Dennis Busby (19 June 1949 – May 2024) was an English professional footballer and manager. He played for Wycombe Wanderers, Luton Town, Newcastle United, Fulham, Norwich City, Stoke City, Sheffield United, Tulsa Roughnecks, Blackburn Rovers and York City.

== Playing career ==
Born in Slough, Buckinghamshire, Busby started his playing career at Wycombe Wanderers in 1966, but was unable to hold down a regular place in their team. He moved to Luton Town in January 1970. At Kenilworth Road, he scored four goals in his first nine matches, helping the club gain promotion to the Second Division in 1969–70. He scored eight goals in 1970–71 but struggled to find form in 1971–72 and spent time out on loan at Newcastle United. He was sold to Fulham in August 1973 where he had the most prolific spell of his career. He scored 12 goals in 1973–74 and 18 in 1974–75 of which six were in the FA Cup helping Fulham reach the 1975 FA Cup final, losing 2–0 against West Ham United. After scoring 38 goals in 155 matches for the Cottagers, he moved to First Division Norwich City where he scored 11 goals in his first 18 matches, including a hat-trick against Leicester City on New Year's Day 1977.

However, he fell out of favour in 1977–78 and moved on to Stoke City. In 1978–79, he helped Stoke gain promotion to the First Division. He scored 12 goals for Stoke in 60 matches and spent a short time on loan at Sheffield United before moving to the United States to play for Tulsa Roughnecks. He stayed in Tulsa, Oklahoma for the 1980 North American Soccer League season before returning to England with Blackburn Rovers, and then ended his playing career with York City.

== Managerial and coaching career ==
Busby worked as a coach at York City between 1982 and 1987. He was Sunderland AFC first team coach under Denis Smith between 1987 and 1991. He became manager of Hartlepool United on 15 February 1993 and left the position on 24 November 1993. He was a youth team coach at Swindon Town in 2001, during which time he underwent six months of treatment for leukaemia. He was named as assistant manager at York City in September 2004. He became the caretaker manager at York City in November 2004 following the sacking of Chris Brass. He left York by mutual consent on 10 February 2005, when he was replaced by Billy McEwan. Busby worked as Youth Academy Manager at Gretna, but left after a change to the backroom staff. He was appointed assistant manager at Workington in September 2007. He left in October 2011 to emigrate to Spain.

== Personal life and death ==
Busby was the older brother of former Queens Park Rangers midfielder Martyn Busby. Busby died in May 2024, at the age of 74.

== Career statistics ==
Appearances and goals by club, season and competition
Club	Season	League			FA Cup		League Cup		Other (Note: Includes Anglo-Italian Cup, Anglo-Scottish Cup, Watney Cup.)		Total	
Club	Season	Division	Apps	Goals	Apps	Goals	Apps	Goals	Apps	Goals	Apps	Goals
Wycombe Wanderers	1966–67	Isthmian League	12	5	0	0	0	0	0	0	12	5
Wycombe Wanderers	1967–68	Isthmian League	16	8	0	0	0	0	0	0	16	8
Wycombe Wanderers	1968–69	Isthmian League	15	4	0	0	0	0	0	0	15	4
Wycombe Wanderers	1969–70	Isthmian League	7	2	0	0	0	0	0	0	7	2
Wycombe Wanderers	Total		50	19	0	0	0	0	0	0	50	19
Luton Town	1969–70	Third Division	9	4	0	0	0	0	0	0	9	4
Luton Town	1970–71	Second Division	27	8	0	0	1	0	0	0	28	8
Luton Town	1971–72	Second Division	20	2	0	0	1	0	1	0	22	2
Luton Town	1972–73	Second Division	21	2	1	0	3	0	2	0	27	2
Luton Town	Total		77	16	1	0	5	0	3	0	86	16
Newcastle United (loan)	1971–72	First Division	4	2	1	0	0	0	0	0	5	2
Fulham	1973–74	Second Division	38	12	2	0	2	0	0	0	42	12
Fulham	1974–75	Second Division	38	11	12	6	3	1	0	0	54	18
Fulham	1975–76	Second Division	37	6	1	1	3	0	9	1	50	8
Fulham	1976–77	Second Division	5	0	0	0	2	0	3	0	10	0
Fulham	Total		118	29	15	7	10	1	12	1	155	38
Norwich City	1976–77	First Division	17	11	1	0	0	0	0	0	18	11
Norwich City	1977–78	First Division	5	0	0	0	0	0	3	0	8	0
Norwich City	Total		22	11	1	0	0	0	3	0	26	11
Stoke City	1977–78	Second Division	22	3	2	1	0	0	0	0	24	4
Stoke City	1978–79	Second Division	18	6	1	0	3	1	0	0	22	7
Stoke City	1979–80	First Division	10	1	0	0	4	0	0	0	14	1
Stoke City	Total		50	10	3	1	7	1	0	0	60	12
Sheffield United (loan)	1979–80	Third Division	3	1	0	0	0	0	0	0	3	1
Tulsa Roughnecks	1980	North American Soccer League	19	1	—		—		—		19	1
Blackburn Rovers	1980–81	Second Division	8	1	0	0	0	0	0	0	8	1
York City	1982–83	Fourth Division	16	4	0	0	0	0	0	0	16	4
York City	1983–84	Fourth Division	3	0	2	0	0	0	0	0	5	0
York City	Total		19	4	2	0	0	0	0	0	21	4
Career total			370	94	21	8	22	2	18	1	431	105

== Managerial statistics ==
Managerial record by team and tenure
Team	From	To	Record					Ref
Team	From	To	P	W	D	L	Win %	Ref
Hartlepool United	15 February 1993	24 November 1993	40	9	9	22	22.5	
York City (caretaker)	8 November 2004	10 February 2005	14	4	2	8	28.6	
Total			54	13	11	30	24.1	—

== Honours ==
Luton Town

- Football League Third Division second-place promotion: 1969–70

Fulham

- FA Cup runner-up: 1974–75
- Anglo-Scottish Cup runner-up: 1975–76

Stoke City

- Football League Second Division third-place promotion: 1978–79

York City

- Football League Fourth Division: 1983–84
