= 1974 FA Cup final =

Association football match

- The twin towers at Wembley Stadium
- Event: 1973–74 FA Cup
Liverpool	Newcastle United
3	0
- Date: 4 May 1974
- Venue: Wembley Stadium, London
- Referee: Gordon Kew (Bucks)
- Attendance: 100,000
- Weather: dry, overcast, cool with very little wind

The 1974 FA Cup final was an association football match between Liverpool and Newcastle United on Saturday, 4 May 1974 at Wembley Stadium, London. It was the final match of the 1973–74 FA Cup, the 93rd season of England's primary cup competition, the Football Association Challenge Cup, better known as the FA Cup. Liverpool were appearing in their fifth final and Newcastle in their eleventh, which was a record at the time. Liverpool had won the FA Cup once, in 1965, and Newcastle six times, most recently in 1955.

Both teams entered the competition in the third round. Liverpool and Newcastle had scares in the third and fourth rounds, in all cases drawing home ties against much smaller clubs and then winning the replays. Both had good wins in the fifth round and Liverpool won away in the sixth (quarter-final) round. Newcastle's sixth round home tie against Nottingham Forest was declared void after a riot on the field by Newcastle fans when their team was losing 1–3. The game was delayed until order was restored and Newcastle won it 4–3. Forest made a written protest to the Football Association (the FA) and Newcastle were very close to being disqualified from the competition. The FA relented and ordered that the match must be replayed at a neutral venue. Two replays were needed before Newcastle won through. In the semi-finals, Newcastle defeated Burnley 2–0 at Hillsborough and Liverpool defeated Leicester City 3–1 in a replay at Villa Park, following a 0–0 draw at Old Trafford.

The final, televised live, was watched by a crowd of 100,000 and Liverpool won a one-sided match 3–0 with goals by Kevin Keegan (2) and Steve Heighway. After the third goal, BBC TV's match commentator David Coleman said that Newcastle's defence had been "stripped naked" by Liverpool. When the score was 0–0, Liverpool left back Alec Lindsay had a goal disallowed for Keegan being offside, but replays later showed that the final rebound pass to Lindsay came from a Newcastle defender and therefore the goal should have stood. Liverpool won the FA Cup for the second time.

The team managers Bill Shankly (Liverpool) and Joe Harvey (Newcastle) sat next to each other all through the match. It was Shankly's last game in charge of Liverpool as he retired in July and was succeeded by coach Bob Paisley – though Shankly led the team out for the Charity Shield match in August. Harvey retired at the end of the 1974–75 season. Two Newcastle players, Terry McDermott and Alan Kennedy, became Liverpool players in later years and both scored goals for Liverpool in European Cup finals. Kevin Keegan joined Newcastle as a player in 1982 and was their manager in the 1990s.

== Background ==
The final was held at Wembley Stadium.

The FA Cup, known officially as The Football Association Challenge Cup, is an annual knockout association football competition in men's domestic English football. Organised by and named after The Football Association (The FA), the tournament was first played during the 1871–72 season and is the world's oldest association football competition. The 1974 match at Wembley was the 93rd FA Cup Final.

The match was Liverpool's fifth appearance in the final. They had won the competition once, defeating Leeds United 2–1 after extra time in the 1965 final. Liverpool had been runners-up in 1914, when they lost 1–0 to Burnley; in 1950, beaten 2–0 by Arsenal; and in 1971, beaten 2–1 after extra time by Arsenal.

Newcastle were appearing in a then record eleventh final. They had won the competition six times and been runners-up four times. Their first appearance was in the 1905 final at Crystal Palace which they lost 2–0 to Aston Villa. They reached the 1906 final too but were again beaten, this time 1–0 by Everton. Newcastle's third final was in 1908, again at Crystal Palace. They had finished fourth in the First Division that season, after winning the league in 1906–07 and, in the semi-final, they had beaten Fulham 6–0. Their 1908 final opponents were Wolverhampton Wanderers ("Wolves") who had just finished ninth in the Second Division. Newcastle were therefore strong favourites to win their first FA Cup but, in a major shock, Wolves won the final 3–1. Newcastle's first win was in the 1910 final when they defeated Barnsley 2–0 in a replay at Goodison Park after the first match at Crystal Palace had ended 1–1. Newcastle reached the final again in 1911 and another replay was necessary, following a goalless draw at Crystal Palace against Bradford City, but they lost the replay at Old Trafford, Bradford winning 1–0. Newcastle appeared in two inter-war finals, winning both. They defeated Aston Villa 2–0 in the second Wembley final, nicknamed the "Rainy Day Final"; and in 1932 they defeated Arsenal 2–1 in the "Over The Line Final". Newcastle enjoyed tremendous success in the early 1950s when the great Jackie Milburn was their centre forward. They won the FA Cup three times from 1951 to 1955: defeating Blackpool 2–0 in 1951, Arsenal 1–0 in 1952 and Manchester City 3–1 in 1955.

== Route to the final ==
=== Liverpool ===
Round	Opponents	Score
3rd	Doncaster Rovers (h)	2–2
3rd	Doncaster Rovers (a)	2–0
4th	Carlisle United (h)	0–0
4th	Carlisle United (a)	2–0
5th	Ipswich Town (h)	2–0
6th	Bristol City (a)	1–0
SF	Leicester City (n)	0–0
SF	Leicester City (n)	3–1

Liverpool entered the competition in the third round and were drawn at home against Doncaster Rovers, who were struggling in the bottom half of the Fourth Division, eventually finishing 22nd and therefore 90th of the 92 Football League clubs. At Anfield, Doncaster were close to achieving a major shock but Liverpool managed to secure a 2–2 draw and then won the replay 2–0 at Belle Vue. Liverpool struggled again in the fourth round, unable to score at Anfield against Second Division Carlisle United, who were promoted to the First Division at the end of the season. As in the previous tie, Liverpool won the replay 2–0, played at Brunton Park.

In the fifth round, Liverpool were drawn at home again and were in a "tie of the round" situation against one of their main rivals Ipswich Town, who had won at Old Trafford in the fourth round to knock out Manchester United. This time, despite facing strong opposition, Liverpool achieved victory at the first attempt and qualified for the quarter-final stage with a 2–0 win. In the sixth round, they were drawn away for the first time in the tournament against Second Division Bristol City and won 1–0 at Ashton Gate. In the previous round, Bristol City had beaten the First Division leaders Leeds United at Elland Road.

Liverpool now faced their sometime "bogey team" Leicester City in the semi-final at Old Trafford. After a goalless draw, the replay took place at Villa Park and Liverpool won 3–1.

=== Newcastle United ===
Round	Opponents	Score
3rd	Hendon (h)	1–1
3rd	Hendon (a)	4–0
4th	Scunthorpe United (h)	1–1
4th	Scunthorpe United (a)	3–0
5th	West Bromwich Albion (a)	3–0
6th	Nottingham Forest (h)	4–3 (void)
6th	Nottingham Forest (n)	0–0
6th	Nottingham Forest (n)	1–0
SF	Burnley (n)	2–0

Newcastle United entered the competition in the third round and were drawn at home against non-league Hendon, who were the reigning champions of the regional Isthmian League. Hendon came close to a major upset and held Newcastle 1–1 at St James' Park. Newcastle recovered to win the replay 4–0 at Vicarage Road, Watford. A similar situation arose in the fourth round when Newcastle were drawn at home against struggling Fourth Division side Scunthorpe United, who also achieved a 1–1 draw at St James' Park. In the replay at the Old Showground, Newcastle won 3–0.

In the fifth round, Newcastle won 3–0 away to Second Division West Bromwich Albion. This set up a sixth round home tie against Nottingham Forest who, like West Brom, were a mid-table Second Division team. Newcastle won the match 4–3 after trailing 3–1, but The Football Association ordered a replay as Newcastle supporters had rioted and invaded the pitch in the second half. This ended in a 0–0 draw after extra time, and Newcastle finally won the tie 1–0 in a second replay at Goodison Park.

In the semi-final at Hillsborough, Newcastle faced Burnley who were above them in the First Division table. Newcastle nevertheless won the match 2–0 with two second half goals by Macdonald.

== Match ==
=== First half ===
Liverpool had more of the play in the first half but, with few clear chances, the match was goalless at half-time.

=== Second half ===
Liverpool dominated the second half despite having a goal by Alec Lindsay disallowed for offside. Many considered this decision incorrect as television replays showed that Newcastle's Alan Kennedy inadvertently played the final pass to Lindsay, so the goal should have stood. Kevin Keegan opened the scoring with a volley after Tommy Smith had passed the ball into the penalty area from the right. With half an hour to go, Ray Clemence became a virtual spectator. The second goal was scored by Steve Heighway, who had scored Liverpool's only goal in the 1971 final. He ran onto a header by John Toshack and placed the ball wide of Liam McFaul. Near the end, a passing move by several Liverpool players ended with Smith playing another right field pass, this time across the front of the goalmouth, that was turned into the net by Keegan from close range.

=== Details ===
4 May 1974
15:00 BST

Liverpool	3–0	Newcastle United
Keegan 57', 88'; Heighway 74'	Report

Wembley, London
Attendance: 100,000
Referee: Gordon Kew

Liverpool	Newcastle United

GK	1	(England) Ray Clemence
RB	2	(England) Tommy Smith
LB	3	(England) Alec Lindsay
CB	4	(England) Phil Thompson
CM	5	(Scotland) Peter Cormack
CB	6	(England) Emlyn Hughes (c)
CF	7	(England) Kevin Keegan
CM	8	(Scotland) Brian Hall
LM	9	(Republic of Ireland) Steve Heighway
CF	10	(Wales) John Toshack
RM	11	(England) Ian Callaghan
Substitute:
DF	12	(England) Chris Lawler
Manager:
(Scotland) Bill Shankly

GK	1	(Northern Ireland) Willie McFaul
RB	2	(England) Frank Clark
LB	3	(England) Alan Kennedy
CM	4	(England) Terry McDermott
CB	5	(England) Pat Howard
CB	6	(Scotland) Bobby Moncur (c)
RW	7	(Scotland) Jimmy Smith	(substituted off) 75'
CM	8	(Northern Ireland) Tommy Cassidy
ST	9	(England) Malcolm Macdonald
ST	10	(England) John Tudor
LW	11	(England) Terry Hibbitt
Substitute:
MF	12	(Scotland) Tommy Gibb	(substituted on) 75'
Manager:
(England) Joe Harvey

Match rules

- 90 minutes.
- 30 minutes of extra-time if necessary.
- Replay if scores still level.
- One named substitute.

== Post-match ==
After the match ended, some Liverpool supporters ran onto the pitch and bowed down at Shankly's feet. He said afterwards: "These are the people, who came on the field and bowed down, these are the people I'm pleased for, more than anybody else, more than myself".
