= Gordon Kew =

English football referee (1930–2018)

- Full name: Gordon Cecil Kew
- Born: 4 June 1930; South Shields, England
- Died: 23 August 2018 (aged 88)

Domestic
Years	League	Role
1960–1966	Football League	Linesman
1966–1977	Football League	Referee

International
Years	League	Role
1974–1977	FIFA listed	Referee

Gordon Cecil Kew (4 June 1930 – 23 August 2018) was an English football referee in the Football League and for FIFA. During his refereeing career he was based in Leeds, Yorkshire, then Amersham, Buckinghamshire, and, for his final season, Middlesbrough, Yorkshire.

== Career ==
Kew reached the Football League linesmen's List in 1960 and was promoted to the referees List in 1966. Five years later he was selected to be senior linesman to Norman Burtenshaw for the FA Cup Final between Arsenal and Liverpool.

In 1972–73 he made his mark by sending off seven players, the highest ever total at the time. In 1974, he took charge of a FA Cup quarter-final between Newcastle United and Nottingham Forest (then in the old Division 2). Kew awarded Forest a penalty and then sent off Newcastle defender Pat Howard for his protests. Forest scored and, shortly afterwards, Newcastle fans invaded the pitch, causing the game to be suspended. After play restarted Newcastle came from behind to win the game 4–3. Following concerns that allowing the result to stand would encourage hooliganism, the FA annulled the result and ordered the tie to be replayed at a neutral venue (Goodison Park). Newcastle eventually won (again) after a replay. Kew was to see Newcastle again in the Final. They met Liverpool, and were beaten 3–0.

He was appointed to the FIFA List for the following season (1974–75).

In his retirement year, one last honour came his way when he was appointed to the 1977 League Cup Final between Aston Villa and Everton at Wembley. This required two replays, at Hillsborough and Old Trafford, before Villa won 3–2. All were refereed by Kew. It is the only major English Final to require three games to resolve the winners.

Preceded by Ken Burns	FA Cup Final Referee; 1974	Succeeded by Pat Partridge
