= John MacNamee =

Scottish footballer

Personal information
- Date of birth: 31 July 1942 (age 84)
- Place of birth: Edinburgh, Scotland
- Position: Winger

Youth career
- Thornton Hibs

Senior career*
Years	Team	Apps	(Gls)
1961–1962	Raith Rovers	15	(3)
1962–1964	Montrose	27	(11)
1964–1965	Reading	0	(0)
1965–1967	Corby Town		
1967–1970	Tranmere Rovers	72	(12)
- Altrincham
Total		114	(26)
- * Club domestic league appearances and goals

John MacNamee (born 31 July 1942) is a footballer who played as a winger in the Football League for Tranmere Rovers.
