= Graham Collier (footballer) =

English footballer (born 1951)

Personal information
- Full name: Graham Ronald Collier
- Date of birth: 12 September 1951 (age 75)
- Place of birth: Nottingham, England
- Height: 6 ft 0 in (1.83 m)
- Position: Midfielder

Youth career
- –1972: Nottingham Forest

Senior career*
Years	Team	Apps	(Gls)
1969–1972	Nottingham Forest	15	(2)
1972–1977	Scunthorpe United	161	(19)
1977–1978	Barnsley	24	(2)
1978	Buxton		
1978	York City	5	(0)
1978–	Buxton		
Total		205	(23)
- * Club domestic league appearances and goals

Graham Ronald Collier (born 12 September 1951) is an English former professional footballer who played as a midfielder in the Football League for Nottingham Forest, Scunthorpe United, Barnsley and York City, and in non-League football for Buxton. He took over as assistant manager of Ilkeston Town in June 1994. He was a member of England's victorious team at first ever World Nations Cup of walking football held at St George's in August 2023.
