= Trevor Swift =

English footballer (1948–2022)

Personal information
- Full name: Trevor Swift
- Date of birth: 14 September 1948
- Place of birth: Rotherham, England
- Date of death: 18 February 2022 (aged 73)
- Position: Central defender

Senior career*
| Years | Team | Apps | (Gls) |
| 1967–1975 | Rotherham United | 287 | (4) |
| 1975 | Worksop Town | | |
| Total | | 287 | (4) |
- * Club domestic league appearances and goals

Trevor Swift (14 September 1948 – 18 February 2022) was an English professional footballer who played in the Football League for Rotherham United. Swift died on 18 February 2022, at the age of 73.
