= John Ryan (footballer, born 1947) =

English footballer and manager

Personal information
- Full name: John Gilbert Ryan
- Date of birth: 20 July 1947 (age 79)
- Place of birth: Lewisham, England
- Height: 5 ft 10 in (1.78 m)
- Position: Full-back

Senior career*
Years	Team	Apps	(Gls)
–1964	Maidstone United		
1964–1965	Arsenal	0	(0)
1965–1969	Fulham	47	(1)
1969–1976	Luton Town	266	(10)
1976–1979	Norwich City	116	(26)
1979–1980	Seattle Sounders	56	(18)
1980–1982	Sheffield United	56	(2)
1982–1983	Manchester City	19	(0)
1983	Stockport County	2	(0)
1983–1984	Chester City	4	(0)
1984–1985	Cambridge United	5	(0)
- Maidstone United
Total		571	(57)

Managerial career
- 1984–1985: Cambridge United
- Sittingbourne
- Dover Athletic
- –1997: Dulwich Hamlet
- * Club domestic league appearances and goals

John Gilbert Ryan (born 20 July 1947) is an English former professional footballer who predominantly played as a full-back.

Ryan had a professional career that lasted more than 20 years. He first joined Arsenal from non-league side Maidstone United in 1964, though he never played a first team game for Arsenal, instead playing in the reserves before being released in 1965. He went on to have spells with Fulham (1965–69), Luton Town (1969–76), Norwich City (1976–79), Sheffield United (1980–82), Manchester City (1982–83), Stockport County (1983), Chester City (1983–84) and Cambridge United (1984–85), where he also had a spell as manager.

Ryan also played in the US for Seattle Sounders and after leaving Cambridge returned to Maidstone United. He went on to manage Sittingbourne, Dover Athletic and Dulwich Hamlet.

== Honours ==
Sheffield United

- Football League Fourth Division: 1981–82
