= Matt Tees =

Scottish footballer (1939–2020)

Personal information
- Full name: Matthew Tees
- Date of birth: 13 October 1939
- Place of birth: Johnstone, Scotland
- Date of death: 3 November 2020 (aged 81)
- Position: Forward

Youth career
- 1957: Penilee Athletic
- 1957–1960: Cambuslang Rangers

Senior career*
Years	Team	Apps	(Gls)
1960	Forfar Athletic (trialist)	1	(1)
1960–1963	Airdrieonians	43	(12)
1963–1967	Grimsby Town	113	(51)
1967–1969	Charlton Athletic	89	(32)
1969–1971	Luton Town	35	(13)
1971–1973	Grimsby Town	83	(42)
1973–1974	Boston United		
1974–1975	Greyhound		
Total		364	(151)
- * Club domestic league appearances and goals

Matthew Tees (13 October 1939 – 4 November 2020) was a Scottish footballer.

Originally a machinist at a carpet factory, he was discovered while playing for local leagues in Scotland with Cambuslang Rangers. After a spell with Airdrie, he played for Grimsby Town (two spells), Charlton Athletic and Luton Town before ending his career with Boston United in the Northern Premier League.

He died on 4 November 2020, at the age of 81.

== Career ==
After beginning his career in the local leagues in Scotland with Cambuslang Rangers before joining professional football with Airdrie. He then joined Grimsby Town, Charlton Athletic, Luton Town and back to Grimsby Town, during his second spell at Grimsby, Tees was part of the 1971–72 team that won the Division Four title.

A 2017 BBC documentary on dementia among retired footballers included a visit to Tees' family home, where it was confirmed he had an advanced stage of the condition; it was suggested that the cause may be the high number of times he headed the ball during his playing career.

== Honours ==
=== Club ===
Grimsby Town

- Division Four Champions (1): 1971–72
