= Pat Howard (footballer) =

English footballer

Personal information
- Full name: Patrick Howard
- Date of birth: 7 October 1947 (age 79)
- Place of birth: Dodworth, England
- Height: 5 ft 11 in (1.80 m)
- Position: Central defender

Youth career
- 1963–1965: Barnsley

Senior career*
Years	Team	Apps	(Gls)
1965–1971	Barnsley	177	(6)
1971–1976	Newcastle United	184	(7)
1976–1977	Arsenal	16	(0)
1977–1979	Birmingham City	40	(0)
1978	→ Portland Timbers (loan)	24	(1)
1979–1982	Bury	118	(5)
Total		559	(19)
- * Club domestic league appearances and goals

Patrick Howard (born 7 October 1947) is an English former professional footballer who played as a central defender.

Howard made more than 500 appearances in the Football League for Barnsley, Newcastle United, Arsenal, Birmingham City and Bury, and also appeared in the NASL for Portland Timbers.

== Career ==
Born in Dodworth, Barnsley, West Riding of Yorkshire, Howard made more than 500 appearances in the Football League. He started his career at Barnsley, spending seven seasons there before signing for Newcastle United in 1971. He reached the 1974 FA Cup Final with the Magpies, and was signed by Arsenal for £40,000 in September 1976. He made his debut against West Ham United on 11 September 1976, but did not settle at the club and after less than a year he was transfer listed with just 20 Arsenal appearances, without a single goal to his name.

He moved to Birmingham City in August 1977, and after two seasons there finished his career in English football with a three-year stint at Bury, retiring in 1982. He also spent the 1978 North American Soccer League season playing for Portland Timbers.

== Honours ==
Newcastle United

- FA Cup runner-up: 1973–74
- Football League Cup runner-up: 1975–76
