= Fred Jardine =

Scottish footballer

Personal information
- Full name: Frederick Jardine
- Date of birth: 27 September 1941 (age 85)
- Place of birth: Edinburgh, Scotland
- Height: 5 ft 11 in (1.80 m)
- Position: Defender

Youth career
- Edina Hearts

Senior career*
Years	Team	Apps	(Gls)
- Dundee
1961–1971	Luton Town	220	(9)
1971–1972	Torquay United	11	(0)
- Ampthill Town
- * Club domestic league appearances and goals

Frederick Jardine (27 September 1941 - 7 October 2019) was a Scottish former professional footballer, best known as a player for Luton Town.

== Career ==
Jardine played youth football for Edina Hearts, and turned professional with Dundee. Moving south to English team Luton Town in 1961, Jardine made 243 appearances for the club before leaving for Torquay United in 1971. After his first full season with Torquay, Jardine left to join Ampthill Town.
