= Keith Allen (footballer) =

English footballer

Personal information
- Full name: Keith Allen
- Date of birth: 9 November 1943 (age 82)
- Place of birth: Newport, Isle of Wight, England
- Height: 6 ft 1 in (1.85 m)
- Position: Forward

Youth career
- Ryde Sports

Senior career*
Years	Team	Apps	(Gls)
1962–1964	Portsmouth	0	(0)
1964–1965	Grimsby Town	6	(1)
1965–1967	Stockport County	49	(15)
1967–1970	Luton Town	137	(36)
1970–1973	Plymouth Argyle	79	(10)
- * Club domestic league appearances and goals

Keith Allen (born 9 November 1943) is an English former professional footballer.

== Career ==
After playing youth football on his native Isle of Wight with Ryde Sports, Allen was signed by Portsmouth in 1962. He did not make a single appearance during two years at Fratton Park, and was sold in 1964 to Grimsby Town, where he made six league appearances during the 1964–65 season, scoring once. At the end of the season he moved, this time to join Stockport County, where he became a more regular fixture in the first-team, making 49 league appearances over two seasons and scoring 15 times.

This improved form attracted the attention of Luton Town, who signed the 23-year-old Allen in 1967. Allen played over 150 times for Luton over three seasons, and scored 43 goals in all competitions as the club won two promotions. He is particularly remembered by fans of both Luton and Stockport for giving away a penalty at Kenilworth Road when the two clubs met in a Football League Division 3 match on 25/04/1969. A fan in the crowd blew a whistle and Allen, thinking that play had been stopped, caught the ball. Allen was sold in 1970, to Plymouth Argyle, where he spent three seasons before ending his career.
