= Laurie Sheffield =

Welsh footballer (1939–2021)

Personal information
- Full name: Laurence Joseph Sheffield
- Date of birth: 27 April 1939
- Place of birth: Swansea, Wales
- Date of death: 9 November 2021 (aged 82)
- Position: Centre forward

Youth career
- Swansea City

Senior career*
Years	Team	Apps	(Gls)
	Bristol Rovers	0	(0)
1958–1961	Barry Town	139	(78)
1961–1965	Newport County	91	(46)
1965–1966	Doncaster Rovers	58	(34)
1966–1967	Norwich City	27	(16)
1967–1968	Rotherham United	19	(6)
1968	Oldham Athletic	18	(6)
1968–1969	Luton Town	35	(12)
1969–1970	Doncaster Rovers	15	(6)
1970–1971	Peterborough United	18	(6)
Total		281	(132)
- * Club domestic league appearances and goals

Laurence Joseph Sheffield (27 April 1939 – 9 November 2021) was a Welsh footballer who played as a centre forward in the Football League.

Following his second period with Doncaster Rovers, Sheffield was signed by Peterborough United for £10,000.

Sheffield died on 9 November 2021, at the age of 82.
