= Mike Harrison (footballer, born 1940) =

English footballer (1940–2019)

Personal information
- Full name: Michael John Harrison
- Date of birth: 18 April 1940
- Place of birth: Ilford, England
- Date of death: 27 January 2019 (aged 78)
- Place of death: Spain
- Position: Left winger

Youth career
- Chelsea

Senior career*
Years	Team	Apps	(Gls)
1957–1963	Chelsea	61	(8)
1963–1967	Blackburn Rovers	160	(40)
1967–1968	Plymouth Argyle	15	(3)
1968–1970	Luton Town	31	(6)
- Dover Town
Total		256	(57)

International career
- England Schools
- England U23
- * Club domestic league appearances and goals

Michael John Harrison (18 April 1940 – 27 January 2019) was an English professional footballer who played as a left winger. Harrison made over 250 appearances in the Football League for four clubs over a thirteen-year period.

== Career ==
Born in Ilford, Harrison began his career with the youth team of Chelsea, appearing in the Final of the 1957–58 FA Youth Cup. He made his senior debut in 1957, at the age of 16. He made 61 league appearances for Chelsea, and also played for Blackburn Rovers, Plymouth Argyle and Luton Town, where he made 160, 15 and 31 appearances respectively, before dropping out to play non-league football with Dover Town.

Harrison represented England Schools, and also played for the England under-23 team.

== Later life and death ==
After retiring from football, Harrison worked as an insurance salesman and for a medical company in the West Country.

Harrison died on 27 January 2019, aged 78, at a care home in Spain.
