= Malcolm Macdonald =

English footballer (born 1950)

Personal information
- Full name: Malcolm Ian Macdonald
- Date of birth: 7 January 1950 (age 76)
- Place of birth: London, England
- Height: 5 ft 8 in (1.73 m)
- Position: Forward

Senior career*
Years	Team	Apps	(Gls)
1967–1968	Tonbridge Angels	74	(11)
1968–1969	Fulham	13	(5)
1969–1971	Luton Town	88	(49)
1971–1976	Newcastle United	187	(95)
1976–1979	Arsenal	84	(42)
1977	South Melbourne Hellas	3	(3)
1979	Djurgården	9	(2)
Total		424	(207)

International career
1972	England U23	4	(4)
1972–1975	England	14	(6)

Managerial career
- 1980–1984: Fulham
- 1987–1988: Huddersfield Town
- * Club domestic league appearances and goals

Malcolm Ian Macdonald (born 7 January 1950) is an English former professional footballer, manager and media figure. Nicknamed "Supermac", Macdonald was a quick, powerfully built and prolific goalscorer. He played for Fulham, Luton Town, Newcastle United, Arsenal and England. Macdonald is Newcastle's fifth-highest goalscorer of all time. He was top scorer in the English First Division with Newcastle in 1975 and with Arsenal in 1977.

== Club career ==
=== Early years and Fulham ===
Born in Finlay Street, Fulham, Macdonald attended the same school (Sloane Grammar school on Hortensia Rd in Chelsea) as former Genesis and GTR guitarist Steve Hackett. Macdonald started his career as a full back before switching to centre forward. He started his career at Barnet. After playing for non-league side Tonbridge, his schoolboy hero Bobby Robson paid £1,000 to sign him for Fulham in 1968 just after their relegation from the Football League First Division.

=== Luton Town ===
A year later, Macdonald moved to Luton Town. At Luton he scored 58 times in 101 matches.

=== Newcastle United ===
Newcastle United manager Joe Harvey signed Macdonald for £180,000 in the summer of 1971. He made an immediate impact by scoring a hat-trick on his home debut against Liverpool. It was in this game that MacDonald earned the nickname "Supermac", which came from a chant by the Newcastle fans to the tune of "Superstar" from Jesus Christ Superstar, namely, "Supermac, superstar, how many goals have you scored so far?"

In his first season Newcastle were bottom of the table on 30 October 1971 after Everton handed them their fifth consecutive defeat of the season. That match was the Newcastle debut of Tony Green. With Green and Macdonald teaming up effectively up front for Newcastle, the team prospered, with an unbeaten run of five wins and two draws, climbing up the table. They finished the league eleventh, with Macdonald scoring 30 goals in 52 games in his first season to be Newcastle's top scorer in 1972. He top scored again in 1973, 1974, 1975 and 1976. He was also the First Division's top scorer for that 1975–76 season.

Macdonald scored twice, defeating Burnley in the 1973–74 FA Cup semi-final. In the 1974 FA Cup final, Newcastle lost 3–0 to Liverpool.

Macdonald set up an equalising goal for Alan Gowling in the 1976 League Cup final at Wembley, but Newcastle went on to lose 2–1 to Manchester City.

=== Arsenal ===
Macdonald left Newcastle for Arsenal in 1976, for an unusual fee of £333,333.34. In December 1976, he scored a hat-trick for his new club against Newcastle in a 5–3 win at Highbury. He was the club's top scorer for two consecutive seasons and was the top scorer for the First Division in 1977. Macdonald, at the time not fully fit, got to the FA Cup final of 1978 after scoring twice in the semi-final against Orient at Stamford Bridge. He earned a runners-up medal in the final after a 1–0 defeat to Ipswich Town. At the start of the 1978–79 season, he suffered a knee injury in a League Cup match against Rotherham, an injury from which he was unable to completely recover.

=== South Melbourne Hellas ===
After completing the English First Division season with Arsenal, Macdonald was lured to Australia in 1977 to play for South Melbourne Hellas in the National Soccer League.

He played three games during the middle of the 1977 National Soccer League season, scoring on his debut against West Adelaide, playing at home against Brisbane Lions and most notably scoring twice against St George (who fielded former Arsenal star Charlie George), which drew a capacity crowd to Middle Park, providing a rare high point to an otherwise poor season for Hellas.

=== Djurgården ===
Macdonald spent a couple of months in Sweden with Djurgården, after which he announced his retirement from playing at the premature age of 29 in August 1979. In his footballing career, Macdonald scored a total of 193 goals.

== International career ==
While at Newcastle, he made his England debut against Wales at Wembley Stadium. Macdonald was on the England scoresheet for the first time in a friendly 2–0 win over then World Champions West Germany.

On 16 April 1975, in a European Championship qualifier also held at Wembley Stadium, Macdonald scored all five goals in a 5–0 victory for England against Cyprus equalling the record for the most goals scored in a single game by an England player. This feat has not been repeated since by any English footballer. Although three pre-war players, Howard Vaughton, Steve Bloomer and Willie Hall, had previously scored five for England, Macdonald was the first, and remains the only, player to do so in a competitive international. His feat spawned the newspaper headline "SuperMac 5, Cyprus 0".

In total he played 14 times for England scoring six goals.

== Managerial career ==
After retirement from playing, Macdonald returned to Fulham as a manager in 1980. His time at Craven Cottage was initially successful, with promotion to the Second Division being achieved in 1982.

In the 1982–83 season, they appeared certainties for promotion to the First Division for the majority of the season, but a slump in the later stages of the season allowed their lead to wither away and they finished 4th. The following season began as a struggle before a second half turnaround saw them into mid-table safety, with Macdonald, even before the season's end leaving the club in April 1984.

He returned to management at Huddersfield Town in 1987, but his time in charge proved unfruitful as the side were relegated from the Second Division in dismal fashion, including a 10–1 defeat to Manchester City.

As of May 2022, Macdonald is the president of North Shields F.C.

== Media career ==
Macdonald appeared on the TV show Superstars in 1975, where he ran 100m in 10.9 seconds.

Macdonald worked extensively for Real Radio North East, presenting, firstly in 2000, the Legends Football Phone-In, alongside Bernie Slaven and Micky Horswill. At the end of the 2011–12 season the programme was axed from Real Radio and then made its way on to Star Radio North East, so continuing in a similar format until 2014. Macdonald also presented an interview series for the Century Radio Network titled Upfront With Malcolm Macdonald, in which he talked to famous players such as Ian Wright, Joe Royle and Peter Beardsley among others.

He also writes a regular column for the retro football magazine Backpass.

In 2011, Macdonald was strongly critical of Newcastle United's decision to change their stadium name from St James' Park to the Sports Direct Arena. Macdonald said: "It seems antagonistic. It's not only part of the football club's heritage, but part of the heritage of the city."

== Outside football ==
After a failed business venture and divorcing his second wife, he struggled with the aftermath of his injury. Macdonald said that the pain from his long-standing knee injury led to an increasing dependence on alcohol. He eventually gave up drinking in 1997.

Macdonald is married to Carol, the former wife of Brian Johnson.

== Career statistics ==
=== Club ===
Appearances and goals by club, season and competition
Club	Season	League			National cup		League cup		Other		Total	
Club	Season	Division	Apps	Goals	Apps	Goals	Apps	Goals	Apps	Goals	Apps	Goals
Fulham	1968–69	Second Division	13	5	0	0	0	0	0	0	13	5
Luton Town	1969–70	Third Division	46	25	3	1	5	2	0	0	54	28
Luton Town	1970–71	Second Division	42	24	2	4	3	2	0	0	47	30
Luton Town	Total		88	49	5	5	8	4	0	0	101	58
Newcastle United	1971–72	First Division	42	23	2	2	2	1	6	4	52	30
Newcastle United	1972–73	First Division	35	17	2	1	1	1	9	5	47	24
Newcastle United	1973–74	First Division	29	15	9	7	2	3	4	3	44	28
Newcastle United	1974–75	First Division	42	21	2	0	6	6	8	5	58	32
Newcastle United	1975–76	First Division	39	19	7	4	7	1	3	0	56	24
Newcastle United	Total		187	95	22	14	18	12	30	17	257	138
Arsenal	1976–77	First Division	41	25	3	3	6	1	0	0	50	29
Arsenal	1977–78	First Division	39	15	6	7	7	4	0	0	52	26
Arsenal	1978–79	First Division	4	2	0	0	1	0	1	0	6	2
Arsenal	Total		84	42	9	10	14	5	1	0	108	57
Djurgården	1979	Allsvenskan	9	2	0	0	—		0	0	9	2
Career total			381	193	36	29	40	21	31	17	488	260

=== International ===
Appearances and goals by national team and year
National team	Year	Apps	Goals
England Under 23	1972	4	4
Total		4	4
England	1972	3	0
England	1973	1	0
England	1974	3	0
England	1975	7	6
Total		14	6

Scores and results list England's goal tally first, score column indicates score after each Macdonald goal.

List of international goals scored by Malcolm Macdonald
No.	Date	Venue	Opponent	Score	Result	Competition
1	12 March 1975	Wembley Stadium, London, England	West Germany	2–0	2–0	Friendly
2	16 April 1975	Wembley Stadium, London, England	Cyprus	1–0	5–0	UEFA Euro 1976 qualifying
3	16 April 1975	Wembley Stadium, London, England	Cyprus	2–0	5–0	UEFA Euro 1976 qualifying
4	16 April 1975	Wembley Stadium, London, England	Cyprus	3–0	5–0	UEFA Euro 1976 qualifying
5	16 April 1975	Wembley Stadium, London, England	Cyprus	4–0	5–0	UEFA Euro 1976 qualifying
6	16 April 1975	Wembley Stadium, London, England	Cyprus	5–0	5–0	UEFA Euro 1976 qualifying

== Honours ==
Newcastle United

- FA Cup runner-up: 1973–74
- Football League Cup runner-up: 1975–76

Arsenal

- FA Cup runner-up: 1977–78

Individual

- PFA Team of the Year: 1973–74 First Division
- Football League First Division top scorer: 1974–75, 1976–77
- Newcastle United Hall of Fame
- Football League 100 Legends
