= Max Dougan =

Scottish footballer (born 1938)

Personal information
- Full name: Maxwell Spalding Dougan
- Date of birth: 23 May 1938 (age 88)
- Place of birth: Stoneyburn, Scotland
- Position: Defender

Senior career*
Years	Team	Apps	(Gls)
1962–1963	Queen's Park	33	(0)
1963–1966	Leicester City	9	(0)
1966–1970	Luton Town	118	(0)
1970–1972	Bedford Town	46	(1)
- Dunstable Town
- * Club domestic league appearances and goals

Maxwell Spalding Dougan (born 23 May 1938) is a Scottish former professional footballer.

== Career ==
After playing amateur football for Queen's Park, Dougan turned professional in 1963 as he signed for English club Leicester City. After three years and only nine league appearances however, Dougan moved on to join Luton Town. At Luton he was utilised more frequently, playing 132 matches over the course of his four seasons with the club. In 1970, he joined Bedford Town, before a period with Dunstable Town.

== Honours ==
Leicester City

- Football League Cup: 1963–64
