= Graham French =

English footballer (born 1945)

Personal information
- Full name: Graham Edward French
- Date of birth: 6 April 1945 (age 81)
- Place of birth: Shrewsbury, England
- Height: 5 ft 10 in (1.78 m)
- Position: Winger

Youth career
- Shrewsbury Town

Senior career*
Years	Team	Apps	(Gls)
1961–1963	Shrewsbury Town	27	(1)
1963–1964	Swindon Town	5	(0)
1964–1965	Watford	4	(0)
1965	Wellington Town		
1965–1973	Luton Town	182	(22)
1973	→ Reading (loan)	3	(0)
1974	Boston Minutemen	3	(0)
1976	Southport	2	(0)
- * Club domestic league appearances and goals

Graham Edward French (also known as Graham Lafite) is an English former professional footballer, who was best known as a winger for Luton Town.

== Football career ==
=== Early career ===
French started his career as an apprentice with his home town club Shrewsbury Town, and signed professionally in 1961. The talented young winger became an England youth international, and Chelsea boss Tommy Docherty was interested in bringing him to Stamford Bridge – however, Docherty was put off by French's suspect temperament, and he signed for Swindon instead. He left for Watford a year later, who let him go after only four games to join non-League Wellington Town.

=== Luton Town ===
French was given another chance by Luton Town in 1965. French led a life off the pitch atypical of a professional sportsman, often starting games worse for wear as his sessions at the local pubs were common knowledge. Fortunately, French had great stamina, and once the ball was wormed out to French on the wing his hangover seemed to evaporate into thin air. French was regarded as one of the best wingers in the Football League, and he used his strength, pace and two-footed ability to help Luton to two promotions.

French scored what is often regarded as Luton Town's greatest ever goal in a match against Mansfield Town on 18 September 1968. He collected the ball on the edge of his own penalty area and set off on a mazy run through the Mansfield team. He then drew the goalkeeper off his line, rounded him and slotted the ball into the net.

=== Later career ===
A shooting incident in a pub in 1970 resulted in him serving a three-year prison sentence. Luton Town gave him the chance to return on his release, but prison life had taken its toll on French, and he was unable to regain his place in the team. A short loan spell at Reading proved to be a last hurrah, and he soon left to play in the United States with the Boston Minutemen. He only made three appearances for the Minutemen, and spent two years out of the game before reappearing in 1976 with Southport under the assumed name of Graham Lafite.
