= George Hamstead =

English footballer

Personal information
- Full name: George William Hamstead
- Date of birth: 24 January 1946 (age 80)
- Place of birth: Rotherham, West Riding of Yorkshire, England
- Height: 5 ft 7 1/2 in (1.71 m)
- Position: Winger

Senior career*
Years	Team	Apps	(Gls)
–1964	Rotherham United	0	(0)
1964–1966	York City	35	(1)
1966–1971	Barnsley	149	(22)
1971–1980	Bury	196	(29)
1977	→ Rochdale (loan)	4	(0)
Total		384	(52)
- * Club domestic league appearances and goals

George William Hamstead (born 24 January 1946) is an English former professional footballer who played as a winger in the Football League for York City, Barnsley, Bury and Rochdale and was on the books of Rotherham United without making a league appearance. He served as reserve team coach at Bury after retiring from playing.
