= Sandy Davie =

Scottish footballer (born 1945)

Personal information
- Full name: Alexander Grimmond Davie
- Date of birth: 10 June 1945 (age 81)
- Place of birth: Dundee, Scotland
- Height: 6 ft 0 in (1.83 m)
- Position: Goalkeeper

Youth career
- 1960–1961: Butterburn YC

Senior career*
Years	Team	Apps	(Gls)
1961–1968	Dundee United	118	(0)
1967	→ Dallas Tornado (guest)	7	(0)
1968–1970	Luton Town	58	(0)
1970–1972	Southampton	1	(0)
1972–1974	Dundee United	25	(0)
1975–1977	North Shore United		
1978–1982	Mount Wellington		
1983	Napier City Rovers	8	(0)

International career
1964	Scotland under-23	1	(0)
1979–1981	New Zealand	11	(0)

Managerial career
- North Shore United
- * Club domestic league appearances and goals

Alexander Grimmond Davie (born 10 June 1945) is a Scottish former footballer, who played as goalkeeper. Davie spent most of his career with Dundee United and represented Scotland at under-23 level and New Zealand at senior level.

In 1967, Ted Bates tried to sign Davie for £15,000 but the offer was rejected. He eventually joined Southampton in May 1970 (for a fee of £12,500) as cover for Eric Martin, but only made one appearance for the Saints on 20 February 1971 in a 5–1 defeat at Manchester United. Four of Manchester United's goals were scored by Alan Gowling. He returned to his home town club in May 1972 where he enjoyed several good seasons before emigrating to New Zealand.

Davie played for the All Whites, making his debut in a 3–0 win over Fiji on 1 July 1979 and ended his international playing career with 11 A-international caps to his credit. He was involved at various levels with the New Zealand ladies' football team – the Football Ferns – until April 2003. Davie was also manager at North Shore United shortly after emigrating.

== Honours ==
Dundee United

- Scottish Cup runner-up: 1974

== See also ==
- List of sportspeople who competed for more than one nation
