= Derek Possee =

English footballer

Personal information
- Full name: Derek James Possee
- Date of birth: 14 February 1946 (age 80)
- Place of birth: Southwark, England
- Height: 5 ft 5 in (1.65 m)
- Position: Winger

Youth career
- –1963: Tottenham Hotspur

Senior career*
Years	Team	Apps	(Gls)
1963–1967	Tottenham Hotspur	19	(4)
1967–1973	Millwall	223	(79)
1973–1974	Crystal Palace	53	(13)
1974–1977	Leyton Orient	80	(11)
1977	St Patrick's Athletic		
1977–1979	Vancouver Whitecaps	53	(17)
Total		428+	(124+)
- * Club domestic league appearances and goals

Derek James Possee (born 14 February 1946) is an English former professional footballer who played as a winger. In a professional career which lasted from 1963 to 1979, Possee made over 400 league appearances, scoring over 100 league goals. He is Millwall's third all-time leading scorer, with 87 goals in all competitions.

== Career ==
Born in Southwark, Possee began his career as an apprentice at Tottenham Hotspur, before becoming a professional there. In January 1964 he scored on his debut in a 3–1 victory over Aston Villa at White Hart Lane.

Possee also played in the Football League for Millwall, Crystal Palace and Leyton Orient.

He signed for St Patrick's Athletic in October 1977 under Barry Bridges and scored twice on his debut on the 16th.

Possee then spent three seasons in the North American Soccer League with the Vancouver Whitecaps, helping them to win the Soccer Bowl in 1979.

Possee suffered tragedy in his post playing career life. His son Danny, aged 22, was shot and killed by police in 1992 whilst they were executing a warrant for a narcotics arrest.
