= Alan Slough =

English footballer (1947–2021)

Personal information
- Full name: Alan Peter Slough
- Date of birth: 24 September 1947
- Place of birth: Luton, England
- Date of death: 22 March 2021 (aged 73)
- Position: Midfielder

Senior career*
Years	Team	Apps	(Gls)
1965–1973	Luton Town	275	(28)
1973–1977	Fulham	154	(13)
1977–1981	Peterborough United	105	(10)
1981–1982	Millwall	14	(0)
- Weymouth
Total		548	(51)
- * Club domestic league appearances and goals

Alan Peter Slough (24 September 1947 – 22 March 2021) was an English professional footballer who played as a midfielder in the Football League from the 1960s to 1980s, notably with Luton Town.

== Career ==
Slough signed for the local team Luton Town in 1965 and went on to make 275 league appearances for the club over eight years before moving on to Fulham. After 154 league matches for Fulham, he joined Peterborough United for a transfer fee of £25,000, making 128 appearances in all competitions over four years. After a short spell at Millwall, he ended his career with a period with non-League Weymouth.

== Death ==
Slough died on 22 March 2021, aged 73, following a battle with Parkinson's disease.

== Honours ==
Fulham

- FA Cup runner-up: 1974–75
