= Tony Read =

English footballer (born 1942)

Personal information
- Full name: John Anthony Read
- Date of birth: 5 July 1942 (age 84)
- Place of birth: Haydock, England
- Height: 6 ft 1 1/2 in (1.87 m)
- Positions: Goalkeeper; forward

Youth career
- Sheffield Wednesday

Senior career*
Years	Team	Apps	(Gls)
1964–1965	Peterborough United	2	(0)
1965–1972	Luton Town	203	(12)
- * Club domestic league appearances and goals

John Anthony "Tony" Read (born 5 July 1942) is an English former footballer, most noted as a player for Luton Town.

== Playing career ==
After failing to make the grade at Sheffield Wednesday, goalkeeper Read signed for Peterborough United. After only two appearances, he was on the move again, as he signed for Luton Town in March 1965.

Read arrived at Luton with a broken foot, and after a spree of goalscoring in the reserves, Read finally arrived in the Luton first team during the 1965–66 season—as a forward. Read scored 12 goals in 20 starts, even including a hat-trick against Notts County, but his rich vein of form soon dried up and he returned to his position between the posts.

Read was a regular for the next six years and a firm fans' favourite at Kenilworth Road, but in 1972 he decided to hang up his gloves.
