= Jack Bannister (footballer) =

English footballer

Personal information
- Date of birth: 26 January 1942 (age 84)
- Place of birth: Chesterfield, England
- Position: Wing half

Youth career
- West Bromwich Albion

Senior career*
Years	Team	Apps	(Gls)
1959–1963	West Bromwich Albion	9	(0)
1964–1965	Scunthorpe United	9	(0)
1965–1969	Crystal Palace	120	(7)
1969–1971	Luton Town	83	(0)
1971–1974	Cambridge United	32	(0)
1974–1975	Dunstable Town	?	(?)
Total		253	(7)
- * Club domestic league appearances and goals

Jack Bannister (born 26 January 1942 in Chesterfield, Derbyshire, England), is an English former footballer who played as a wing half in the Football League. He made a total of 253 appearances for West Bromwich Albion, Scunthorpe United, Crystal Palace, Luton Town and Cambridge United before moving into non-league football with Dunstable Town.

== Playing career ==
Bannister began his youth career at West Bromwich Albion and went on to a senior career at the club, but after only nine league appearances over four seasons, signed for Scunthorpe United in 1964. However, after only a further nine appearances he signed for Crystal Palace on 1 July 1965. In 1965–66, Bannister made 22 appearances, but in the two subsequent seasons missed only one game. In 1969, Palace were promoted to the top tier for the first time, but Bannister played only 15 times, in the early part of the promotion season, and in October 1968, was transferred to Luton Town. He made 83 appearances over two seasons for Luton, before finishing his league career at Cambridge United (32 appearances). He then moved into non-league football with Dunstable Town.
