= 1956–57 Cardiff City F.C. season =

Welsh football club season

Cardiff City
1956–57 season
- Manager: Trevor Morris
- Football League First Division: 21st
- FA Cup: 4th round
- Welsh Cup: 6th round
- Top goalscorer: League: Gerry Hitchens (21); All: Gerry Hitchens (25)
- Highest home attendance: 38,333 v Leeds United, 6 October 1956
- Lowest home attendance: 11,302 v Arsenal, 15 December 1956
- Average home league attendance: 20,528
Home colours

The 1956–57 season was Cardiff City F.C.'s 30th season in the Football League. They competed in the 22-team Division One, then the first tier of English football, finishing twenty-first, suffering relegation to Division Two.

== Players ==
Note: Flags indicate national team as defined under FIFA eligibility rules; some limited exceptions apply. Players may hold more than one non-FIFA nationality.

No.	Pos.	Nation	Player
--	GK	WAL	Ken Jones
--	GK	WAL	Ron Howells
--	GK	WAL	Graham Vearncombe
--	DF	WAL	Colin Baker
--	DF	WAL	Ron Davies
--	DF	WAL	John Frowen
--	DF	SCO	Alick Gray
--	DF	SCO	Danny Malloy
--	DF	ENG	Charles Rutter
--	DF	WAL	Ron Stitfall
--	DF	WAL	Derrick Sullivan
--	MF	WAL	Alan Harrington
--	MF	WAL	Brian Jenkins
--	MF	SCO	George McGuckin

No.	Pos.	Nation	Player
--	MF	SCO	John McSeveney
--	MF	ENG	Cliff Nugent
--	MF	SCO	Bob Scott
--	MF	WAL	Ken Tucker
--	MF	ENG	Brian Walsh
--	FW	ENG	Cecil Dixon
--	FW	WAL	Trevor Ford
--	FW	WAL	Don Godwin
--	FW	ENG	Gerry Hitchens
--	FW	ENG	Bernard Jones
--	FW	ENG	Harry Kirtley
--	FW	WAL	Neil O'Halloran
--	FW	WAL	Brayley Reynolds
--	FW	ENG	Ron Stockin

== League standings ==
Pos	Team	Pld	W	D	L	GF	GA	GAv	Pts	Qualification or relegation
18	Manchester City	42	13	9	20	78	88	0.886	35	
19	Portsmouth	42	10	13	19	62	92	0.674	33	
20	Sunderland	42	12	8	22	67	88	0.761	32	
21	Cardiff City (R)	42	10	9	23	53	88	0.602	29	Relegation to the Second Division
22	Charlton Athletic (R)	42	9	4	29	62	120	0.517	22	Relegation to the Second Division

Source: World Football
Rules for classification: 1) Points; 2) Goal average; 3) Goals scored
(R) Relegated

=== Results by round ===
Round	1	2	3	4	5	6	7	8	9	10	11	12	13	14	15	16	17	18	19	20	21	22	23	24	25	26	27	28	29	30	31	32	33	34	35	36	37	38	39	40	41	42
Ground	A	H	H	A	A	H	H	A	A	A	H	H	A	A	H	A	H	A	H	A	H	A	A	H	A	H	H	A	A	H	H	A	A	H	A	H	H	A	A	H	H	H
Result	D	W	D	L	L	W	D	L	L	L	D	W	L	L	D	W	W	L	W	L	L	L	L	L	W	W	L	W	L	D	L	L	L	L	D	W	D	D	L	L	L	L
Position			6	11	15	12	12	13	16	17	16	16	17	20	19	16	15	17	15	17	19	19	19	19	19	19	19	19	19	19	19	19	19	21	20	19	19	20	20	21	21	21
Points	1	3	4	4	4	6	7	7	7	7	8	10	10	10	11	13	15	15	17	17	17	17	17	17	19	21	21	23	23	24	24	24	24	24	25	27	28	29	29	29	29	29

Source: Competitive matches
A = Away; H = Home; W = Win; D = Draw; L = Loss

== Fixtures and results ==
=== First Division ===
18 August 1956 1	Arsenal	0–0	Cardiff City	London
15:00				Stadium: Highbury; Attendance: 51,069; Referee: Hugh Gerrard (Preston)

22 August 1956 2	Cardiff City	5–2	Newcastle United	Cardiff
18:30	John McSeveney 10'; Cliff Nugent 40', 55'; Trevor Ford 66', 77'		5', 63' Reg Davies	Stadium: Ninian Park; Attendance: 35,833; Referee: Ken Dagnall (Bolton)

25 August 1956 3	Cardiff City	3–3	Burnley	Cardiff
15:00	John McSeveney 2'; Gerry Hitchens 7'; Trevor Ford 20'		11', 80' Peter McKay; 73' Jimmy McIlroy	Stadium: Ninian Park; Attendance: 30,769; Referee: Ken Aston (Ilford, Essex)

29 August 1956 4	Newcastle United	1–0	Cardiff City	Newcastle
18:15	Vic Keeble 90'			Stadium: St James's Park; Attendance: 34,859; Referee: Arthur Edward Ellis (Halifax)

1 September 1956 5	Preston North End	6–0	Cardiff City	Preston
15:00	Tom Finney (?); Tommy Thompson (?); Jimmy Baxter; Danny Malloy (o.g.)			Stadium: Deepdale; Attendance: 22,102; Referee: Norman Taylor (Westbury)

5 September 1956 6	Cardiff City	2–1	Sheffield Wednesday	Cardiff
18:15	Gerry Hitchens 8'; John McSeveney 45'		33' Roy Shiner	Stadium: Ninian Park; Attendance: 12,983; Referee: John Mitchell (Trescott)

8 September 1956 7	Cardiff City	1–1	Chelsea	Cardiff
15:15	Ken Armstrong 19' (o.g.)		87' Johnny McNichol	Stadium: Ninian Park; Attendance: 26,568; Referee: Gilbert Pullin (Bristol)

12 September 1956 8	Sheffield Wednesday	5–3	Cardiff City	Sheffield
19:30	Redfern Froggatt 24', 70'; Alan Finney 20', 72'; Albert Quixall 60' (pen.)		19', 30' (pen.) John McSeveney; 85' Brian Walsh	Stadium: Hillsborough; Attendance: 37,235

15 September 1956 9	Bolton Wanderers	2–0	Cardiff City	Bolton
	Ray Parry; Nat Lofthouse			Stadium: Burnden Park; Attendance: 28,738; Referee: Harold Husband (London)

22 September 1956 10	Birmingham City	2–1	Cardiff City	Birmingham
	Alex Govan; Noel Kinsey		Neil O'Halloran	Stadium: St Andrew's; Attendance: 39,931; Referee: Jim Pickles (Cheshire)

29 September 1956 11	Cardiff City	0–0	West Bromwich Albion	Cardiff
15:15				Stadium: Ninian Park; Attendance: 22,362; Referee: Les Hamer (Bolton)

6 October 1956 12	Cardiff City	4–1	Leeds United	Cardiff
15:00	Trevor Ford 13'; Gerry Hitchens 26', 90'; John McSeveney 47'		1' Bobby Forrest	Stadium: Ninian Park; Attendance: 38,333; Referee: SW Barker (Kent)

13 October 1956 13	Tottenham Hotspur	5–0	Cardiff City	London
	George Robb; George Robb; George Robb 89'; Alfie Stokes; Alfie Stokes			Stadium: White Hart Lane; Attendance: 52,429; Referee: Peter Brandwood (Worcester)

27 October 1956 14	Wolverhampton Wanderers	3–1	Cardiff City	Wolverhampton
15:00	Colin Booth 33'; Harry Hooper 40' (pen.); Jimmy Mullen 49'	Wolves complete history	44' Gerry Hitchens	Stadium: Molineux; Attendance: 34,935; Referee: HJ Husband (London)

3 November 1956 15	Cardiff City	1–1	Manchester City	Cardiff
14:45	Brayley Reynolds		Jack Dyson	Stadium: Ninian Park; Attendance: 23,820; Referee: AE Westwood (Stratford on Avon)

10 November 1956 16	Charlton Athletic	0–2	Cardiff City	London
			Gerry Hitchens; Brayley Reynolds	Stadium: The Valley; Attendance: 17,642; Referee: RH Mann (Worcester)

17 November 1956 17	Cardiff City	1–0	Sunderland	Cardiff
14:45	Cliff Nugent 54'			Stadium: Ninian Park; Attendance: 20,017; Referee: Jim Pickles (Bradford)

24 November 1956 18	Luton Town	3–0	Cardiff City	Luton
14:15	Tony Gregory 22'; Bob Morton 57', 64'	Luton report		Stadium: Kenilworth Road; Attendance: 13,674; Referee: W Hickson (Wigan)

1 December 1956 19	Cardiff City	1–0	Everton	Cardiff
14:30	John McSeveney 67'			Stadium: Ninian Park; Attendance: 15,600; Referee: JJ Baxter (Baisingbourn, Herts)

8 December 1956 20	Blackpool	3–1	Cardiff City	Blackpool
14:15	Allan Brown; Allan Brown; Dave Durie		Brian Walsh	Stadium: Bloomfield Road; Attendance: 16,623; Referee: Ken Aston (Ilford, Essex)

15 December 1956 21	Cardiff City	2–3	Arsenal	Cardiff
14:30	Gerry Hitchens; Gerry Hitchens		Joe Haverty; David Herd; David Herd	Stadium: Ninian Park; Attendance: 11,302; Referee: Hugh Gerrard (Preston)

22 December 1956 22	Burnley	6–2	Cardiff City	Burnley
14:15	Jimmy McIlroy 12', 65'; Doug Newlands 14', 32'; Les Shannon 47'; Albert Cheesebrough 80'		6', 58' Gerry Hitchens	Stadium: Turf Moor; Attendance: 10,118; Referee: Ken Aston (Ilford, Essex)

26 December 1956 23	Manchester United	3–1	Cardiff City	Manchester
14:15	Tommy Taylor 19'; Dennis Viollet 53'; Liam Whelan 70'		2' (pen.) Danny Malloy	Stadium: Old Trafford; Attendance: 28,810; Referee: Denis Howell (Birmingham)

29 December 1956 24	Cardiff City	2–3	Preston North End	Cardiff
14:30	Ron Stockin; John McSeveney		Tommy Thompson; Tommy Thompson (o.g.) Danny Malloy	Stadium: Ninian Park; Attendance: 15,474; Referee: Norman Taylor (Westbury)

12 January 1957 25	Chelsea	1–2	Cardiff City	London
14:15	Derek Saunders 43'		32' John McSeveney; 76' Gerry Hitchens	Stadium: Stamford Bridge; Attendance: 28,828; Referee: Gilbert Pullin (Bristol)

19 January 1957 26	Cardiff City	2–0	Bolton Wanderers	Cardiff
14:45	Gerry Hitchens; Brian Walsh			Stadium: Ninian Park; Attendance: 12,810; Referee: HJ Husband (London)

2 February 1957 27	Cardiff City	1–2	Birmingham City	Cardiff
15:00	John McSeveney		Eddy Brown; Gordon Astall	Stadium: Ninian Park; Attendance: 16,854; Referee: Jim Pickles (Cheshire)

9 February 1957 28	West Bromwich Albion	1–2	Cardiff City	West Bromwich
15:00	Derek Kevan		Gerry Hitchens; Colin Baker	Stadium: The Hawthorns; Attendance: 23,522; Referee: Les Hamer (Chorley)

16 February 1957 29	Leeds United	3–0	Cardiff City	Leeds
	Frank McKenna 70'; John Charles 73'; Bobby Forrest 77'			Stadium: Elland Road; Attendance: 21,695; Referee: SW Barker (Kent)

23 February 1957 30	Cardiff City	2–2	Wolverhampton Wanderers	Cardiff
15:15	Gerry Hitchens 41'; Colin Baker 49'	Wolves complete record	42', 44' Joe Bonson	Stadium: Ninian Park; Attendance: 13,879; Referee: HJ Husband (London)

9 March 1957 31	Cardiff City	3–4	Blackpool	Cardiff
15:15	Gerry Hitchens; Gerry Hitchens; John McSeveney (pen.)		Dave Durie; Dave Durie; Dave Durie; Dave Durie	Stadium: Ninian Park; Attendance: 15,274; Referee: Ken Aston (Ilford, Essex)

13 March 1957 32	Aston Villa	4–1	Cardiff City	Birmingham
15:00	Peter McParland 1'; Jackie Sewell 5', 61'; Stan Lynn 84' (pen.)		9' Gerry Hitchens	Stadium: Villa Park; Attendance: 12,567; Referee: AA Howlett (Swindon)

16 March 1957 33	Manchester City	4–1	Cardiff City	Manchester City
15:00	Bobby Johnstone 25', 53', 87'; Jack Dyson 71'		(pen.) John McSeveney	Stadium: Maine Road; Attendance: 26,395; Referee: AE Westwood (Stratford on Avon)

23 March 1957 34	Cardiff City	2–3	Charlton Athletic	Cardiff
15:15	Colin Baker 14'; Gerry Hitchens 39'		60', 81' Stuart Leary; 84' Sam Lawrie	Stadium: Ninian Park; Attendance: 17,047; Referee: RH Mann (Worcester)

30 March 1957 35	Sunderland	1–1	Cardiff City	Sunderland
15:00	Billy Bingham 23'		68' Gerry Hitchens	Stadium: Roker Park; Attendance: 40,100; Referee: Alf Bond (Fulham)

3 April 1957 36	Cardiff City	1–0	Aston Villa	Cardiff
17:15	John McSeveney 48'			Stadium: Ninian Park; Attendance: 18,354; Referee: AA Howlett (Swindon)
Note: McSeveney missed a penalty on 50 minutes

6 April 1957 37	Cardiff City	0–0	Luton Town	Cardiff
15:15		Luton report		Stadium: Ninian Park; Attendance: 18,730; Referee: W Hickson (Wigan)

13 April 1957 38	Everton	0–0	Cardiff City	Liverpool
15:15				Stadium: Goodison Park; Attendance: 24,397; Referee: JJ Baxter (Royston, Herts)

19 April 1957 39	Portsmouth	1–0	Cardiff City	Portsmouth
15:00	Peter Harris 29'			Stadium: Fratton Park; Attendance: 31,223; Referee: Gilbert Pullin (Bristol)

20 April 1957 40	Cardiff City	0–3	Tottenham Hotspur	Cardiff
15:15			Johnny Brooks; Dave Dunmore; Terry Dyson	Stadium: Ninian Park; Attendance: 25,181; Referee: Peter Brandwood (Kidderminster)

22 April 1957 41	Cardiff City	0–2	Portsmouth	Cardiff
15:15			Peter Harris; Peter Harris	Stadium: Ninian Park; Attendance: 22,197; Referee: Gilbert Pullin (Bristol)

27 April 1957 42	Cardiff City	2–3	Manchester United	Cardiff
15:15	Gerry Hitchens 47', 52'		86' Alex Dawson; 43', 90' (pen.) Albert Scanlon	Stadium: Ninian Park; Attendance: 17,708; Referee: Denis Howell (Birmingham)

=== FA Cup ===
5 January 1957 Round 3	Leeds United	1–2	Cardiff City	Leeds
	John Charles 61'		51' Ron Stockin; 87' John McSeveney	Stadium: Elland Road; Attendance: 34,237; Referee: John Kelly (Chorley)

26 January 1957 Round 4	Cardiff City	0–1	Barnsley	Cardiff
14:45			Frank Bartlett	Stadium: Ninian Park; Attendance: 32,000; Referee: AE Westwood (Stockport)

=== Welsh Cup ===
31 January 1957 Round 5	Haverfordwest County	3–3	Cardiff City	Haverfordwest
	Goal		Gerry Hitchens; Gerry Hitchens; Harry Kirtley	Attendance: 1,800

6 February 1957 Round 5 (Replay)	Cardiff City	8–0	Haverfordwest County	Cardiff
14:45	Gerry Hitchens; Gerry Hitchens; Brian Walsh; Brian Walsh; Harry Kirtley; Ron Stockin; Derrick Sullivan; J Williams (o.g.)			Stadium: Ninian Park; Attendance: 3,500; Referee: J Jones (Swansea)

27 February 1957 Round 6	Cardiff City	0–2	Chester City	Cardiff
15:30			Goal	Stadium: Ninian Park; Attendance: 5,000

== See also ==
- List of Cardiff City F.C. seasons
