= 1955–56 Cardiff City F.C. season =

Welsh football club season

Cardiff City
1955–56 season
- Chairman: Herbert Merrett
- Manager: Trevor Morris
- Division One: 17th
- FA Cup: 4th round
- Welsh Cup: Winners
- Top goalscorer: League: Gerry Hitchens (15); All: Gerry Hitchens (28)
- Highest home attendance: 42,546 v Wolverhampton Wanderers 3 September 1955
- Lowest home attendance: 16,086 v Luton Town, 14 April 1956
- Average home league attendance: 26,631
Home colours

The 1955–56 season was Cardiff City F.C.'s 29th season in the Football League. They competed in the 22-team Division One, then the first tier of English football, finishing seventeenth.

== Season review ==
=== League standings ===
Pos	Team	Pld	W	D	L	GF	GA	GAv	Pts
15	Everton	42	15	10	17	55	69	0.797	40
16	Chelsea	42	14	11	17	64	77	0.831	39
17	Cardiff City	42	15	9	18	55	69	0.797	39
18	Tottenham Hotspur	42	15	7	20	61	71	0.859	37
19	Preston North End	42	14	8	20	73	72	1.014	36

Source: World Football
Rules for classification: 1) Points; 2) Goal average; 3) Goals scored

=== Results by round ===
Round	1	2	3	4	5	6	7	8	9	10	11	12	13	14	15	16	17	18	19	20	21	22	23	24	25	26	27	28	29	30	31	32	33	34	35	36	37	38	39	40	41	42
Ground	H	A	A	H	H	A	A	H	H	A	A	H	A	H	A	H	A	H	A	H	A	H	H	A	A	H	A	A	H	H	A	H	A	A	A	H	H	A	H	A	H	H
Result	W	L	L	W	L	L	L	W	L	L	W	D	L	L	D	W	L	W	L	W	D	W	D	L	W	W	L	W	W	W	W	D	D	L	D	L	L	L	W	D	D	L
Position	5	6	16	11	19	20	21	17	19	21	21	19	20	20	20	20	20	18	19	19	18	18	18	18	18	18	18	18	16	15	12	12	12	16	15	17	17	17	16	16	16	17
Points	2	2	2	4	4	4	4	6	6	6	8	9	9	9	10	12	12	14	14	16	17	19	20	20	22	24	24	26	28	30	32	33	34	34	35	35	35	35	37	38	39	39

A = Away; H = Home; W = Win; D = Draw; L = Loss

=== FA Cup ===
After beating Leeds United in their first game, Cardiff were eliminated by West Ham United in the fourth round.

=== Welsh Cup ===
Cardiff were drawn against Pembroke Borough in the fifth round for the second time in a row and, after a 2–2 draw, advanced to the sixth round with a 9–0 replay win. Wins over Wrexham and Oswestry Town saw the club reach the final, beating South Wales rivals Swansea Town 3–2, with a brace from Brian Walsh and one goal from John McSeveney winning the trophy for the eighth time in the club's history and their first since 1930.

== Players ==
Note: Flags indicate national team as defined under FIFA eligibility rules; some limited exceptions apply. Players may hold more than one non-FIFA nationality.

No.	Pos.	Nation	Player
--	GK	WAL	Ken Jones
--	GK	WAL	Ron Howells
--	GK	WAL	Graham Vearncombe
--	DF	WAL	Colin Baker
--	DF	WAL	Ron Davies
--	DF	WAL	John Frowen
--	DF	WAL	Colin Gale
--	DF	SCO	Danny Malloy
--	DF	ENG	Charles Rutter
--	DF	WAL	Alf Sherwood
--	DF	WAL	Ron Stitfall
--	DF	WAL	Derrick Sullivan
--	MF	WAL	Dennis Callan
--	MF	WAL	Alan Harrington
--	MF	WAL	Islwyn Jones

No.	Pos.	Nation	Player
--	MF	SCO	George McGuckin
--	MF	SCO	John McSeveney
--	MF	ENG	Cliff Nugent
--	MF	ENG	Gordon Nutt
--	MF	WAL	Ken Tucker
--	MF	ENG	Brian Walsh
--	MF	WAL	Roley Williams
--	FW	ENG	Cecil Dixon
--	FW	WAL	Trevor Ford
--	FW	ENG	Gerry Hitchens
--	FW	ENG	Bernard Jones
--	FW	ENG	Harry Kirtley
--	FW	WAL	Neil O'Halloran
--	FW	WAL	Howard Sheppeard
--	FW	ENG	Ron Stockin

== Fixtures and results ==
=== First Division ===
20 August 1955 1	Cardiff City	3–1	Sunderland	Cardiff
15:15	John McSeveney 55' (pen.), 80'; Trevor Ford 68'		58' Charlie Fleming	Stadium: Ninian Park; Attendance: 36,098; Referee: Alf Bond (Fulham)

23 August 1955 2	Arsenal	3–1	Cardiff City	London
18:30	Tommy Lawton; Tommy Lawton; Tommy Lawton		Ron Stockin	Stadium: Highbury; Attendance: 31,361; Referee: Joe Gardner (Kidderminster)

27 August 1955 3	Aston Villa	2–0	Cardiff City	Birmingham
15:00	Johnny Dixon 10'; Peter McParland 78'			Stadium: Villa Park; Attendance: 32,893; Referee: Reg Hill (Chester)

31 August 1955 4	Cardiff City	1–0	Bolton Wanderers	Cardiff
18:30	Alan Harrington			Stadium: Ninian Park; Attendance: 26,973; Referee: Bill Clements (West Bromwich)

3 September 1955 5	Cardiff City	1–9	Wolverhampton Wanderers	Cardiff
15:15	Ron Stockin 84'		1' Johnny Hancocks; 10' Johnny Hancocks; 14' Jimmy Mullen; 19' Roy Swinbourne; 35' Johnny Hancocks; 56' Roy Swinbourne; 67' Peter Broadbent; 76' Peter Broadbent; 82' Roy Swinbourne	Stadium: Ninian Park; Attendance: 42,546; Referee: John Kelly (Eccleston)

7 September 1955 6	Bolton Wanderers	4–0	Cardiff City	Bolton
	Ray Parry; Ray Parry; Dennis Stevens; Nat Lofthouse			Stadium: Burnden Park; Attendance: 25,012; Referee: Bill Clements (West Bromwich)

10 September 1955 7	Manchester City	3–1	Cardiff City	Manchester
15:00	Joe Hayes; Joe Hayes; Bobby Johnstone		Roley Williams	Stadium: Maine Road; Attendance: 33,240; Referee: Norman Taylor (Westbury)

17 September 1955 8	Cardiff City	3–2	Sheffield United	Cardiff
15:15	Alan Harrington; Trevor Ford; Gerry Hitchens		Peter Wragg; Alf Ringstead	Stadium: Ninian Park; Attendance: 23,337; Referee: Fred Stringer (Nantwich)

24 September 1955 9	Cardiff City	1–2	Huddersfield Town	Cardiff
15:15	Harry Kirtley 55'		41' Jimmy Watson; 48' Willie Davie	Stadium: Ninian Park; Attendance: 25,117; Referee: Robert H Mann (Worcester)

1 October 1955 10	Blackpool	2–1	Cardiff City	Blackpool
15:00	Bill Perry; Ewan Fenton		Trevor Ford	Stadium: Bloomfield Road; Attendance: 33,451; Referee: George McCabe (Sheffield)

8 October 1955 11	Preston North End	1–2	Cardiff City	Preston
	Tom Finney		Trevor Ford; Ron Stockin	Stadium: Deepdale; Attendance: 19,433; Referee: Harold Husband (London)

15 October 1955 12	Cardiff City	2–2	Burnley	Cardiff
15:00	Trevor Ford 4', 36'		28' Albert Cheesebrough; 54' Peter McKay	Stadium: Ninian Park; Attendance: 24,338; Referee: Stanley Rogers (Shrewsbury)

22 October 1955 13	West Bromwich Albion	2–1	Cardiff City	West Bromwich
	Ronnie Allen; Ronnie Allen		Harry Kirtley	Stadium: The Hawthorns; Attendance: 22,131; Referee: Cyril Porter (Taunton)

29 October 1955 14	Cardiff City	0–1	Manchester United	Cardiff
15:00			43' Tommy Taylor	Stadium: Ninian Park; Attendance: 27,759; Referee: Ted (EW) Abbott (Brentwood, Essex)

5 November 1955 15	Tottenham Hotspur	1–1	Cardiff City	London
	Johnny Brooks (pen.)		Brian Walsh	Stadium: White Hart Lane; Attendance: 34,368; Referee: Frank Collinge (Rochdale)

12 November 1955 16	Cardiff City	3–1	Everton	Cardiff
14:45	Brian Walsh 4'; John McSeveney 42', 50'		22' Jimmy Harris	Stadium: Ninian Park; Attendance: 22,439; Referee: Gilbert Pullin (Bristol)

19 November 1955 17	Newcastle United	4–0	Cardiff City	Newcastle
14:15	Charlie Crowe 12'; Jackie Milburn 65', 88' (pen.); Vic Keeble 73'			Stadium: St James's Park; Attendance: 35,603; Referee: Les Hamer (Bolton)

26 November 1955 18	Cardiff City	2–1	Birmingham City	Cardiff
14:30	Harry Kirtley; Cecil Dixon		Eddy Brown	Stadium: Ninian Park; Attendance: 23,638; Referee: Arthur Howlett (Stratton St Margaret)

3 December 1955 19	Luton Town	3–0	Cardiff City	Luton
	Bob Morton 2'; Jimmy Adam 50'; Gordon Turner	Luton report		Stadium: Kenilworth Road; Attendance: 21,827; Referee: Norman C Taylor (Westbury)

10 December 1955 20	Cardiff City	3–1	Charlton Athletic	Cardiff
14:30	Neil O'Halloran 6', 39', 43'		41' Gordon Hurst	Stadium: Ninian Park; Attendance: 23,132; Referee: Frank Cowen (Manchester)

17 December 1955 21	Sunderland	1–1	Cardiff City	Sunderland
14:00	Billy Elliott 10'		26' (o.g.) Jack Hedley	Stadium: Roker Park; Attendance: 29,823; Referee: Alf Bond (Fulham)

24 December 1955 22	Cardiff City	1–0	Aston Villa	Cardiff
14:30	Gerry Hitchens 75'			Stadium: Ninian Park; Attendance: 20,384; Referee: Reg Hill (Chester)

26 December 1955 23	Cardiff City	1–1	Chelsea	Cardiff
14:30	Alf Sherwood 30' (pen.)		24' Roy Bentley	Stadium: Ninian Park; Attendance: 26,974; Referee: Harry Broadhurst (Atherstone)

27 December 1955 24	Chelsea	2–1	Cardiff City	London
11:15	John McNichol 50'; Les Stubbs 80'		86' Gerry Hitchens	Stadium: Stamford Bridge; Attendance: 36,740; Referee: Harry Broadhurst (Atherstone)

31 December 1955 25	Wolverhampton Wanderers	0–2	Cardiff City	Wolverhampton
			63' Gerry Hitchens; 73' Trevor Ford	Stadium: Molineux; Attendance: 36,772; Referee: Jack Kelly (Chorley)

14 January 1956 26	Cardiff City	4–1	Manchester City	Cardiff
14:45	Gerry Hitchens; Gerry Hitchens; John McSeveney; Trevor Ford		Bobby Johnstone	Stadium: Ninian Park; Attendance: 26,329; Referee: Norman Taylor (Westbury)

21 January 1956 27	Sheffield United	2–1	Cardiff City	Sheffield
14:45	Thomas Hoyland; Bobby Howitt		Alf Sherwood	Stadium: Bramall Lane; Attendance: 22,921; Referee: Fred Stringer (Liverpool)

4 February 1956 28	Huddersfield Town	1–2	Cardiff City	Huddersfield
	Vic Metcalfe (pen.)		Gerry Hitchens; Trevor Ford	Stadium: Leeds Road; Attendance: 12,586; Referee: Robert Mann (Worcester)

11 February 1956 29	Cardiff City	1–0	Blackpool	Cardiff
15:15	Trevor Ford			Stadium: Ninian Park; Attendance: 36,019; Referee: Arthur Smith (Aldershot)

18 February 1956 30	Cardiff City	3–1	Preston North End	Cardiff
15:15	Gerry Hitchens; Harry Kirtley; Trevor Ford		Bobby Foster	Stadium: Ninian Park; Attendance: 25,300; Referee: Harold Husband (London)

25 February 1956 31	Burnley	0–2	Cardiff City	Burnley
			40', 71' Gerry Hitchens	Stadium: Turf Moor; Attendance: 18,549; Referee: Stanley Rogers (Shrewsbury)

7 March 1956 32	Cardiff City	1–1	Newcastle United	Cardiff
16:30	Colin Baker 4'		29' Bill Curry	Stadium: Ninian Park; Attendance: 31,265; Referee: Les Hamer (Chorley)

10 March 1956 33	Manchester United	1–1	Cardiff City	Manchester
15:00	Roger Byrne 49' (pen.)		77' Gerry Hitchens	Stadium: Old Trafford; Attendance: 44,914; Referee: Ted (EW) Abbott (Brentwood, Essex)

24 March 1956 34	Everton	2–0	Cardiff City	Liverpool
	Tony McNamara 48'; Eddie Wainwright 79'			Stadium: Goodison Park; Attendance: 29,959; Referee: Gilbert Pullin (Bristol)

30 March 1956 35	Portsmouth	1–1	Cardiff City	Portsmouth
15:00	Johnny Gordon 70'		56' Trevor Ford	Stadium: Fratton Park; Attendance: 26,443; Referee: Bill Clements (West Bromwich)

31 March 1956 36	Cardiff City	1–3	West Bromwich Albion	Cardiff
15:15	Gerry Hitchens		Johnny Nicholls; Ronnie Allen; Bobby Robson	Stadium: Ninian Park; Attendance: 31,641; Referee: Cyril Porter (Taunton)

2 April 1956 37	Cardiff City	2–3	Portsmouth	Cardiff
15:15	John McSeveney 44'; Trevor Ford 83'		Peter Harris; Mike Barnard; Jackie Henderson	Stadium: Ninian Park; Attendance: 27,018; Referee: Bill Clements (West Bromwich)

7 April 1956 38	Birmingham City	2–1	Cardiff City	Birmingham
15:00	Eddy Brown; Colin Baker (o.g.)		Gerry Hitchens	Stadium: St Andrew's; Attendance: 37,154; Referee: Arthur Howlett (Swindon)

14 April 1956 39	Cardiff City	2–0	Luton Town	Cardiff
15:15	Gerry Hitchens 9'; Brian Walsh 44'	Luton report		Stadium: Ninian Park; Attendance: 16,086; Referee: Norman Taylor (Westbury)

21 April 1956 40	Charlton Athletic	0–0	Cardiff City	London
				Stadium: The Valley; Attendance: 17,726; Referee: Frank Cowen (Manchester)

23 April 1956 41	Cardiff City	0–0	Tottenham Hotspur	Cardiff
18:30				Stadium: Ninian Park; Attendance: 19,684; Referee: Frank Collinge (Rochdale)

28 April 1956 42	Cardiff City	1–2	Arsenal	Cardiff
15:15	Gerry Hitchens		Cliff Holton; Derek Tapscott	Stadium: Ninian Park; Attendance: 23,169; Referee: Joe Gardner (Kidderminster)

=== FA Cup ===
7 January 1956 Round 3	Leeds United	1–2	Cardiff City	Leeds
	Harold Brook 87'		74' Gerry Hitchens; 79' John McSeveney	Stadium: Elland Road; Attendance: 40,000; Referee: Robert H Mann (Worcester)

28 January 1956 Round 4	West Ham United	2–1	Cardiff City	London
14:45	Billy Dare 5'; John Dick 29'		11' Trevor Ford	Stadium: Upton Park; Attendance: 35,500; Referee: Ken Collinge (Sale, Cheshire)

=== Welsh Cup ===
1 February 1956 Round 5	Pembroke Borough	2–2	Cardiff City	Pembroke
	Goal		Trevor Ford; Gerry Hitchens	Stadium: London Road; Attendance: 5,000

8 February 1956 Round 5 (Replay)	Cardiff City	9–0	Pembroke Borough	Cardiff
14:45	Trevor Ford; Trevor Ford; Trevor Ford; Trevor Ford; Gerry Hitchens; Gerry Hitchens; Gerry Hitchens; Colin Baker; John McSeveney			Stadium: Ninian Park; Attendance: 4,549; Referee: GO Hancock (Pontlottyn)

29 February 1956 Round 6	Cardiff City	5–3	Wrexham	Cardiff
16:00	Trevor Ford 4'; Gerry Hitchens 6', 27', 32'; John McSeveney 40'	Wrexham report	26', 70' Elfed Evans; 78' Ron Hewitt	Stadium: Ninian Park; Attendance: 5,300; Referee: CW Kingston (Newport)

17 March 1956 Semi Final	Oswestry	0–7	Cardiff City	Wrexham
			Trevor Ford; Trevor Ford; Gerry Hitchens; Gerry Hitchens; Gerry Hitchens; Gerry Hitchens; Gerry Hitchens	Stadium: The Racecourse; Attendance: 11,418

30 April 1956 Final	Cardiff City	3–2	Swansea Town	Cardiff
18:30	Brian Walsh; Brian Walsh; John McSeveney		Tom Kiley; Des Palmer	Stadium: Ninian Park; Attendance: 37,500; Referee: BM Griffiths (Newport)

== See also ==
- List of Cardiff City F.C. seasons
