= 1954–55 Cardiff City F.C. season =

Welsh football club season

Cardiff City
1954–55 season
- Chairman: (Wales) John Morgan (Wales) Sir Herbert Merrett
- Manager: (England) Cyril Spiers (Wales) Trevor Morris
- Division One: 20th
- FA Cup: 3rd round
- Welsh Cup: Semi-finals
- Top goalscorer: League: Trevor Ford (19); All: Trevor Ford (24)
- Highest home attendance: 39,448 v Preston, 25 August 1954
- Lowest home attendance: 14,461 v Tottenham Hotspur, 26 March 1955
- Average home league attendance: 24,311
Home colours

The 1954–55 season was Cardiff City F.C.'s 28th season in the Football League. They competed in the 22-team Division One, then the first tier of English football, finishing twentieth.

== Season review ==
=== Partial league table ===
Pos	Team	Pld	W	D	L	GF	GA	GAv	Pts	Qualification or relegation
18	Bolton Wanderers	42	13	13	16	62	69	0.899	39	
19	Blackpool	42	14	10	18	60	64	0.938	38	
20	Cardiff City	42	13	11	18	62	76	0.816	37	
21	Leicester City (R)	42	12	11	19	74	86	0.860	35	Relegation to the Second Division
22	Sheffield Wednesday (R)	42	8	10	24	63	100	0.630	26	Relegation to the Second Division

Source: World Football
Rules for classification: 1) Points; 2) Goal average; 3) Goals scored
(R) Relegated

=== Results by round ===
Round	1	2	3	4	5	6	7	8	9	10	11	12	13	14	15	16	17	18	19	20	21	22	23	24	25	26	27	28	29	30	31	32	33	34	35	36	37	38	39	40	41	42
Ground	A	H	H	A	A	H	H	A	H	A	H	A	A	A	H	A	H	A	H	A	H	H	H	A	A	A	H	H	A	H	A	H	H	A	A	H	H	A	H	A	H	A
Result	L	L	W	L	D	D	D	W	W	D	W	L	D	L	D	W	W	W	L	W	L	L	W	L	L	L	W	W	D	W	D	L	L	D	L	L	L	D	D	L	W	L
Position	21	20	18	22	19	19	18	13	12	13	11	13	13	14	14	13	13	11	13	11	12	14	11	13	14	18	16	15	14	12	13	13	15	15	17	18	19	20	19	20	20	20
Points	0	0	2	2	3	4	5	7	9	10	12	12	13	13	14	16	18	20	20	22	22	22	24	24	24	24	26	28	29	31	32	32	32	33	33	33	33	34	35	35	37	37

A = Away; H = Home; W = Win; D = Draw; L = Loss

=== FA Cup ===
Entering the competition in the third round, Cardiff were eliminated by fellow First Division side Arsenal after a 1–0 defeat.

=== Welsh Cup ===
After wins over Pembroke Borough and Newport County, Cardiff were knocked out of the competition in the semi-finals for a third year in a row after a 2–0 defeat to Chester City.

== Players ==
Note: Flags indicate national team as defined under FIFA eligibility rules; some limited exceptions apply. Players may hold more than one non-FIFA nationality.

No.	Pos.	Nation	Player
--	GK	WAL	Ken Jones
--	GK	WAL	Ron Howells
--	GK	WAL	Graham Vearncombe
--	DF	WAL	Colin Baker
--	DF	WAL	Ron Davies
--	DF	WAL	John Frowen
--	DF	WAL	Colin Gale
--	DF	ENG	Stan Montgomery
--	DF	ENG	Charles Rutter
--	DF	WAL	Alf Sherwood
--	DF	WAL	Ron Stitfall
--	DF	WAL	Derrick Sullivan
--	MF	WAL	Billy Baker
--	MF	WAL	Dennis Callan
--	MF	ENG	Don Clarke

No.	Pos.	Nation	Player
--	MF	WAL	Alan Harrington
--	MF	WAL	Islwyn Jones
--	MF	ENG	Cliff Nugent
--	MF	ENG	Gordon Nutt
--	MF	ENG	Mike Tiddy
--	MF	WAL	Roley Williams
--	FW	ENG	Cecil Dixon
--	FW	WAL	George Edwards
--	FW	WAL	Trevor Ford
--	FW	WAL	Alan Gibbs
--	FW	ENG	Wilf Grant
--	FW	ENG	Gerry Hitchens
--	FW	ENG	Tommy Northcott
--	FW	WAL	Neil O'Halloran
--	FW	ENG	Ron Stockin

== Fixtures and results ==
=== First Division ===
21 August 1954 1	Burnley	1–0	Cardiff City	Burnley
15:00	Les Shannon 2'			Stadium: Turf Moor; Attendance: 27,386; Referee: Alf Bond (London)

25 August 1954 2	Cardiff City	2–5	Preston North End	Cardiff
18:30	Mike Tiddy 32'; Trevor Ford 62'		11' Tom Finney; 36' Dennis Hatsell; 49' (pen.), 79' Jimmy Baxter; 90' Bobby Foster	Stadium: Ninian Park; Attendance: 39,448; Referee: Robert (RH) Mann (Worcester)

28 August 1954 3	Cardiff City	2–1	Leicester City	Cardiff
15:15	Tommy Northcott 4'; Trevor Ford 86'		39' Jack Froggatt	Stadium: Ninian Park; Attendance: 25,938; Referee: Arthur (AA) Howlett (Swindon)

1 September 1954 4	Preston North End	7–1	Cardiff City	Preston
18:30	Jimmy Baxter 7'; Tom Finney 14'; Bobby Foster 20', 51'; Charlie Wayman Charlie Wayman; Angus Morrison		9' Wilf Grant	Stadium: Deepdale; Attendance: 29,057; Referee: Robert (RH) Mann (Worcester)

4 September 1954 5	Chelsea	1–1	Cardiff City	London
15:00	Jim Lewis 82'		75' Mike Tiddy	Stadium: Stamford Bridge; Attendance: 42,688; Referee: Norman C Taylor (Westbury)

8 September 1954 6	Cardiff City	1–1	Sheffield United	Cardiff
18:15	Mike Tiddy 11'		30' (pen.) Fred Furniss	Stadium: Ninian Park; Attendance: 28,511; Referee: Arthur (AW) Smith (Aldershot)

11 September 1954 7	Cardiff City	1–1	Huddersfield Town	Cardiff
15:15	Alf Sherwood 4' (pen.)		5' Jimmy Watson	Stadium: Ninian Park; Attendance: 21,840; Referee: Frank Fiander (Bucks)

13 September 1954 8	Sheffield United	1–3	Cardiff City	Sheffield
18:00	Thomas Hoyland 41'		55' Derrick Sullivan; 70' Trevor Ford; 86' Ron Stockin	Stadium: Bramall Lane; Attendance: 18,090; Referee: Arthur (AW) Smith (Aldershot)

18 September 1954 9	Cardiff City	3–0	Manchester City	Cardiff
15:15	Alf Sherwood 24' (pen.); Dave Ewing 30' (o.g.); Ron Stockin 67'			Stadium: Ninian Park; Attendance: 28,847; Referee: Fred Williams (Oxford)

25 September 1954 10	Everton	1–1	Cardiff City	Liverpool
	John Willie Parker 54'		71' Cliff Nugent	Stadium: Goodison Park; Attendance: 54,248; Referee: Gilbert Pullin (Bristol)

2 October 1954 11	Cardiff City	4–2	Newcastle United	Cardiff
15:15	Derrick Sullivan 14'; Ron Stockin 28'; Trevor Ford 65', 68'		88' Jackie Milburn; 89' Len White	Stadium: Ninian Park; Attendance: 34,760; Referee: Leslie (TL) Wood (Bury)

9 October 1954 12	Manchester United	5–2	Cardiff City	Manchester
15:00	Tommy Taylor 30', 42', 59', 67'; Dennis Viollet 60'		10' Trevor Ford; 85' Ron Stockin	Stadium: Old Trafford; Attendance: 41,159; Referee: Fred (FV) Stringer (Nantwich)

16 October 1954 13	Wolverhampton Wanderers	1–1	Cardiff City	Wolverhampton
	Bill Slater 6'		46' Ron Stockin	Stadium: Molineux; Attendance: 30,166; Referee: Charlie Curtis (Bath)

23 October 1954 14	Charlton Athletic	4–1	Cardiff City	London
	Bobby Ayre 52'; Sid O'Linn 70'; Billy Kiernan 72', 87'		1' Trevor Ford	Stadium: The Valley; Attendance: 26,376; Referee: Stan Bostock (Manchester)

30 October 1954 15	Cardiff City	2–2	Bolton Wanderers	Cardiff
15:00	Johnny Wheeler 40' (o.g.); Cliff Nugent 41'		Ray Parry; 75' Harold Hassall	Stadium: Ninian Park; Attendance: 31,698; Referee: Norman C Taylor (Westbury)

6 November 1954 16	Tottenham Hotspur	0–2	Cardiff City	London
			55', 90' Ron Stockin	Stadium: White Hart Lane; Attendance: 38,805; Referee: Harry Haworth (Blackburn)

13 November 1954 17	Cardiff City	5–3	Sheffield Wednesday	Cardiff
14:45	Cliff Nugent 18', 74'; Derrick Sullivan 35'; Tommy Northcott 81'; Mike Tiddy 87'		3', 89' Jackie Sewell; 15' Eddie Gannon	Stadium: Ninian Park; Attendance: 15,998; Referee: Stanley Rogers (Shrewsbury)

20 November 1954 18	Portsmouth	1–3	Cardiff City	Portsmouth
14:15	Jackie Henderson 30'		15', 69' Tommy Northcott; 53' Trevor Ford	Stadium: Fratton Park; Attendance: 31,292; Referee: Joe Gardner (Kidderminster)

27 November 1954 19	Cardiff City	1–2	Blackpool	Cardiff
14:30	Stan Montgomery 80'		10' Johnny McKenna; 37' Ernie Taylor	Stadium: Ninian Park; Attendance: 19,823; Referee: Jack Husband (London)

4 December 1954 20	Aston Villa	0–2	Cardiff City	Birmingham
14:15			23', 30' Trevor Ford	Stadium: Villa Park; Attendance: 25,186; Referee: Vivian Davis (Witney)

11 December 1954 21	Cardiff City	0–1	Sunderland	Cardiff
14:30			61' Ted Purdon	Stadium: Ninian Park; Attendance: 32,098; Referee: Cliff Holland (Stockport)

18 December 1954 22	Cardiff City	0–3	Burnley	Cardiff
14:30			41' (o.g.) Alf Sherwood; 61' Roy Stephenson; 67' Bill Holden	Stadium: Ninian Park; Attendance: 22,035; Referee: Alf Bond (London)

25 December 1954 23	Cardiff City	3–2	West Bromwich Albion	Cardiff
11:00	Trevor Ford; Trevor Ford; Stan Montgomery		Wilf Carter; Ronnie Allen	Stadium: Ninian Park; Attendance: 22,845; Referee: Arthur Smith (Aldershot)

27 December 1954 24	West Bromwich Albion	1–0	Cardiff City	West Bromwich
	Len Millard 89'			Stadium: The Hawthorns; Attendance: 50,885; Referee: Arthur Smith (Aldershot)

1 January 1955 25	Leicester City	2–1	Cardiff City	Leicester
14:15	Derek Hogg 57'; Johnny Morris 80'		58' Gordon Nutt	Stadium: Filbert Street; Attendance: 25,408; Referee: AA Howlett (Wiltshire)

5 February 1955 26	Manchester City	4–1	Cardiff City	Manchester
15:00	Roy Clarke 35'; Paddy Fagan 40'; Joe Hayes 55'; Don Revie 49'		44' (pen.) Trevor Ford	Stadium: Maine Road; Attendance: 31,922; Referee: Fred Williams (Oxford)

12 February 1955 27	Cardiff City	4–3	Everton	Cardiff
15:15	Trevor Ford 29', 75'; Ron Stockin 22', 39'		28', 32' John Willie Parker; 49' Cyril Lello	Stadium: Ninian Park; Attendance: 17,108; Referee: Gilbert Pullin (Bristol)

26 February 1955 28	Cardiff City	3–0	Manchester United	Cardiff
15:15	Ron Stockin 30', 60'; Gordon Nutt 73'			Stadium: Ninian Park; Attendance: 16,329; Referee: Fred Stringer (Nantwich)

5 March 1955 29	Sunderland	1–1	Cardiff City	Sunderland
	Charlie Fleming 68'		29' Ron Stockin	Stadium: Roker Park; Attendance: 41,096; Referee: Cliff Holland (Stockport)

12 March 1955 30	Cardiff City	4–3	Charlton Athletic	Cardiff
15:15	Gordon Nutt 27'; Trevor Ford 41'; Roley Williams 71'; Tommy Northcott		13' Eddie Firmani; 67' Bobby Ayre; 90' Gordon Pembery	Stadium: Ninian Park; Attendance: 20,261; Referee: Stan Bostock (Manchester)

19 March 1955 31	Bolton Wanderers	0–0	Cardiff City	Bolton
				Stadium: Burnden Park; Attendance: 25,321; Referee: Norman C Taylor (Westbury)

23 March 1955 32	Cardiff City	0–1	Chelsea	Cardiff
16:45			43' Seamus O'Connell	Stadium: Ninian Park; Attendance: 16,649; Referee: William Clements (West Bromwich)

26 March 1955 33	Cardiff City	1–2	Tottenham Hotspur	Cardiff
15:15	Trevor Ford 43'		41' Len Duquemin; 55' George Robb	Stadium: Ninian Park; Attendance: 14,461; Referee: Harry Hayworth (Blackburn)

2 April 1955 34	Sheffield Wednesday	1–1	Cardiff City	Sheffield
15:00	Norman Curtis 60'		67' Gordon Nutt	Stadium: Hillsborough; Attendance: 19,541; Referee: Stanley Rogers (Shrewsbury)

8 April 1955 35	Arsenal	2–0	Cardiff City	London
11:15	Derek Tapscott 57', 65'			Stadium: Highbury; Attendance: 39,052; Referee: Robert Mann (Worcester)

9 April 1955 36	Cardiff City	0–1	Aston Villa	Cardiff
15:15			15' Eddie Follan	Stadium: Ninian Park; Attendance: 20,720; Referee: Vivian Davis (Witney)

11 April 1955 37	Cardiff City	1–2	Arsenal	Cardiff
15:15	Alan Harrington		Jimmy Bloomfield; Doug Lishman	Stadium: Ninian Park; Attendance: 29,080; Referee: Robert Mann (Worcester)

16 April 1955 38	Blackpool	0–0	Cardiff City	Blackpool
15:00				Stadium: Bloomfield Road; Attendance: 21,832; Referee: Harry Husband (London)

23 April 1955 39	Cardiff City	1–1	Portsmouth	Cardiff
15:15	Roley Williams 66'		4' Peter Harris	Stadium: Ninian Park; Attendance: 21,185; Referee: Joe Gardner (Kidderminster)

27 April 1955 40	Newcastle United	3–0	Cardiff City	Newcastle
	George Hannah 16', 19'; Alf McMichael 21'			Stadium: St James's Park; Attendance: 19,252; Referee: Arthur Edward Ellis (Halifax)

30 April 1955 41	Cardiff City	3–2	Wolverhampton Wanderers	Cardiff
15:15	Gerry Hitchens 3'; Trevor Ford 18', 79'		88' Dennis Wilshaw; 12' Ron Flowers	Stadium: Ninian Park; Attendance: 30,903; Referee: Charlie Curtis (Bristol)

2 May 1955 42	Huddersfield Town	2–0	Cardiff City	Huddersfield
	Jimmy Glazzard 15'; Jimmy Watson 25'			Stadium: Leeds Road; Attendance: 10,473; Referee: Harry Beacock (Scunthorpe)

=== FA Cup ===
8 January 1955 Round 3	Arsenal	1–0	Cardiff City	London
14:15	Tommy Lawton			Stadium: Highbury; Attendance: 51,298; Referee: Arthur Edward Ellis (Halifax)

=== Welsh Cup ===
12 January 1955 Round 5	Pembroke Borough	0–7	Cardiff City	Pembroke
			Trevor Ford; Trevor Ford; Trevor Ford; Trevor Ford; Cliff Nugent; Ron Stockin; Mike Tiddy	Attendance: 4,000; Referee: TL Davies (Ynyshir)

17 February 1955 Round 6	Newport County	1–3	Cardiff City	Newport
	Goal		Trevor Ford; Ron Stockin; Derrick Sullivan	Stadium: Somerton Park; Attendance: 10,223

13 April 1955 Semi Final	Chester City	2–0	Cardiff City	Wrexham
	Goal			Stadium: The Racecourse; Attendance: 7,961

== See also ==
- List of Cardiff City F.C. seasons
