= Trevor Ford =

Welsh footballer (1923–2003)

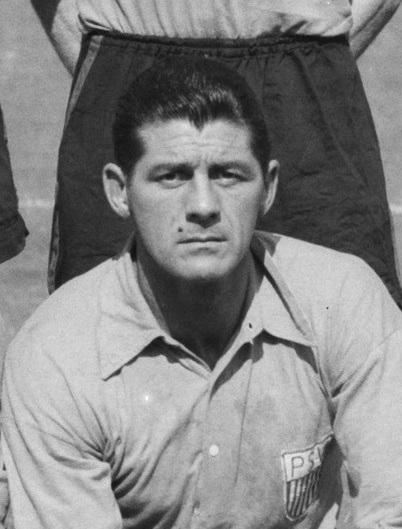
- Ford with PSV Eindhoven in 1959

Personal information
- Full name: Trevor Ford
- Date of birth: 1 October 1923
- Place of birth: Swansea, Wales
- Date of death: 29 May 2003 (aged 79)
- Place of death: Swansea, Wales
- Height: 5 ft 10 in (1.78 m)
- Position: Forward

Youth career
- Tower United
- 1940–1942: Swansea Town

Senior career*
Years	Team	Apps	(Gls)
1942–1947	Swansea Town	16	(9)
1947–1950	Aston Villa	120	(60)
1950–1953	Sunderland	108	(67)
1953–1956	Cardiff City	96	(42)
1957–1960	PSV Eindhoven	53	(21)
1960–1961	Newport County	8	(3)
1960–1961	→ Romford (loan)	10	(4)
Total		411	(206)

International career
1946–1956	Wales	38	(23)
- * Club domestic league appearances and goals

Trevor Ford (1 October 1923 – 29 May 2003) was a Welsh professional footballer who played as a forward for Swansea Town, Aston Villa, Sunderland, Cardiff City, PSV Eindhoven, Newport County and Romford, as well as for the Wales national team. A prolific scorer throughout his career, he scored 202 league goals in 401 matches, the majority coming in the First Division during a career that spanned fifteen years.

Described by The Independent as a "fearsomely physical" forward, Ford began his career with his hometown club Swansea Town during wartime and played for less than one season in the Second Division. He moved to Aston Villa in 1947 where he scored consistently in the First Division, finishing as the club's top scorer for three consecutive seasons between 1947 and 1950.

In October 1950, he transferred to Sunderland for the sum of £30,000, breaking the British transfer fee record at the time. At Sunderland, Ford formed a strike partnership with England international Len Shackleton, known as the "clown prince of football". However the relationship between the two was acrimonious and the club was unable to mount a title challenge despite their investment, finishing in mid-table in each of Ford's seasons at Roker Park. He left Sunderland in 1953 to return to Wales with Cardiff City. He spent three seasons at Ninian Park before being suspended by the Football Association after revealing details of illegal payments being made to players during his time at Sunderland in an attempt to avoid the maximum wage at the time. Unable to play in Britain due to the suspension, Ford joined Dutch side PSV Eindhoven but returned to Britain in 1960 when his suspension was lifted to finish his career with short spells at Newport County and Romford.

During his career, Ford represented Wales on 38 occasions and became his country's all-time record top goalscorer with 23 goals which stood until it was equaled by Ivor Allchurch and later surpassed by Ian Rush and Gareth Bale. Due to his suspension from the game at the time, Ford was overlooked for selection for the 1958 FIFA World Cup. John Charles described Ford as his idol.

== Early life ==
Born in Swansea, Ford was the second child of Trevor and Daisy Ford. His father, Trevor Sr, had been a physical training instructor during the First World War before returning to South Wales to work as a delivery van driver and later at a local cinema, eventually being promoted to manager. Ford was encouraged into football by his father who would buy him a new football and boots for each birthday. He grew up in the Townhill district of the city and attended Powys Avenue School as a child, captaining the school's football side as a centre-half.

Ford's father would often make him practice his football for two hours each day, using a tennis ball on his stronger right foot to improve control. He would also soak a leather football in water and make him wear an ordinary plimsoll on his stronger foot to stop Ford kicking the heavy ball with it. After moving into secondary school, Ford met teacher David Benyon, who was a prominent figure in youth football in the area and included him in the Swansea boys team he managed. Ford was selected to represent Wales at under-14 level in a series of matches against the other home nations of Britain but suffered a broken ankle in a match for his school side just days before the first scheduled fixture against Scotland. Although distraught at missing out, he became determined to return to action as soon as possible and returned to playing football and cricket soon after. At the age of 14, Ford was chosen to represent Wales against a London Schools under-15 side as a bowler, playing alongside his future Wales and Cardiff City teammate Alf Sherwood in the side, himself a keen cricketer.

Ford left school at the age of 15 and began working as a "bogie boy" at a local blast furnace, a job that involved transporting hot shells out of the furnace ready to be shaped into steel tubes, earning 35 shillings a week in wages. After paying his lodge at his parents' home, Ford would often use his remaining money to attend Swansea Town matches at Vetch Field. He later joined the army to complete his wartime service, serving as a physical training instructor in the Royal Artillery and, in the latter stages of the Second World War, was an anti-aircraft gunner.

== Club career ==
=== Early career ===
Ford's first step into organised team football came with local Swansea based side Tower United, joining the club at the age of 15 as a full-back. Despite his young age, he played for the senior men's side in local amateur leagues where he attracted scouts from several clubs. The scouts included Albert Lindon of Arsenal, who invited Ford and teammate Frank Davies to attend a trial in Cardiff. Ford impressed enough to be offered an amateur contract with the London-based side, which was initially to be withheld until the end of hostilities in the Second World War. However, Ford himself rejected the contract as he felt he was too young too move away from his home and family.

He remained in Swansea for another year, working in the local steelworks whilst playing local football, until Swansea Town manager Haydn Green visited Ford's home. Green had taken over Swansea in 1939 and had set about establishing the side as a feeder club for local youth talent due to a lack of finances, offering 17-year-old Ford an amateur contract in 1940 before signing him to his first professional contract with Swansea two years later. With the Football League suspended due to the Second World War, Ford featured for the club in wartime Combination leagues. Having spent his youth career as a defender, during his war service, Ford grew substantially in both height and weight and the Sergeant Major in charge of the local army football side switched him to centre-forward where he flourished, scoring 41 times between 1945 and 1946 in regional wartime competitions. After he was moved from his original army posting in Rhyl to new barracks in Colchester, Ford appeared for Leyton Orient in wartime fixtures, scoring three times in four appearances for the side. Following the return of league football after wartime, he made his fully professional competitive debut and played sixteen times in the first half of the 1946–47 season for the Swans in the Second Division.

=== Aston Villa ===
Trevor Ford moved to Aston Villa in January 1947 for a fee of £9,500 plus Tommy Dodds. On his arrival at Villa Park, he was welcomed by George Edwards, who would be moved to the right-wing to accommodate the signing of Ford. Edwards described Ford as "just the penetrating type of leader Villa needs". He made his debut for his new club on 18 January in a 2–0 win over Arsenal and settled well, scoring nine times in nine games during the second half of the season including a goal on his home debut at Villa Park, a 1–1 draw with Blackpool. He would go on to finish as the club's top scorer in the following three seasons, once scoring four times during a 5–1 victory over local rivals Wolverhampton Wanderers on 27 December 1948.

=== Sunderland ===
Aston Villa were, however, never able to maintain a title push and, in October 1950, 27-year-old Ford was the subject of a British football transfer record when he signed for 'Bank of England club' Sunderland for £30,000. Sunderland also purchased a house for Ford and his family. He was seen as a footballing celebrity at the time due to his prolific scoring record having made 128 appearances for Villa between January 1947 and October 1950 scoring 61 goals.

"I think I shall settle down and not let this £30,000 tag worry me, but at the moment I hope someone else soon takes over the costliest player in the game."

— Ford commenting on the pressure of his record transfer to Sunderland

He made an impressive start for Sunderland, scoring a hat-trick on his home debut at Roker Park against Sheffield Wednesday, including a typically physical finish for one goal, taking Wednesday goalkeeper Dave McIntosh across the line with the ball, and later breaking a post with one effort. Despite being the most expensive footballer in British history, Ford continued to work as a car salesman for the Sunderland chairman in his spare time after training to earn extra money. In March 1951, Ford's record transfer fee was broken, following the transfer of Jackie Sewell from Notts County to Sheffield Wednesday for a fee of £34,500. Ford revealed that he was relieved that the record had been broken having described the fee as "weighing heavy on his shoulders". During the 1952–53 season, the club turned down a bid from Italian side Fiorentina for Ford. Ford had been keen on completing the transfer, which would have seen him earning £2,000 a year each with a £35 match win bonus as well as the club buying each player a house.

With the club's failure to live up to its high spending potential, Ford became a target for doubters due to his physical playing style and his arguments with teammate and former record-breaking signing, Len Shackleton. During a match against Chelsea in February 1952, Ford scored a first-half hat-trick during the match as the Mackems found themselves 4–0 up at half-time, Shackleton having also scored. In the second half of the match, Shackleton was believed to have "switched off" as he considered the match already won, leaving Ford to largely play up-front on his own against the opposition defense, resulting in a frustrated Ford to claim to members of the local press after the game that Shackleton never deliberately passed to him during games. Things became so heated between the pair that, during a friendly match against a Netherlands B side, Shackleton dribbled past the opposition goalkeeper before stopping on the goal-line and passing the ball back to Ford before commenting "Here, don't say I never give you a pass" in reference to Ford's displeasure at his belief that Shackleton would play the ball in areas Ford did not want it. Billy Bingham, who played alongside the pair at Sunderland, later commented "He (Ford) never seemed to know what Shackleton was going to do with the ball and subsequently Trevor believed that Shackleton was ignoring him on the field of play". Stan Anderson, another former teammate of the pair, believed that Shackleton was jealous of Ford's perceived good looks and also supported Ford's claims of Shackleton deliberately misplacing passes to Ford on at least one occasion, commenting "I just had the feeling he (Shackleton) never wanted Trevor to score, which made me really angry".

The arguments between the pair eventually led Ford to refuse to play for the side if Shackleton was in the team, following a match against his former club Aston Villa. He was left out of the side for the following match against Portsmouth with the club releasing a statement that he was being "rested due to his current lack of form". Believing his position of the club had become untenable, Ford handed in a transfer request following the match.

=== Later career ===
In December 1953, with Sunderland having failed to mount a consistent title push despite their high spending, and his transfer request, Ford signed for Cardiff City for £30,000, which was a club record fee for the Bluebirds at the time. Cardiff had seen a previous bid rejected but club manager Cyril Spiers traveled to meet Sunderland's board who informed him that they would not accept anything lower than £30,000. When Spiers informed the Cardiff City board of the situation they ordered him to "pay whatever Sunderland want.", the club desperate to seal the signing of a top quality forward having failed in earlier bids to sign John Charles and Tommy Taylor. After completing the move, his goals helped the club to a tenth-placed finish in his first season at Ninian Park. He spent three years at the club, scoring 68 goals in all competitions and winning the Welsh Cup in 1956 with a 3–2 victory over his former side Swansea Town. Ford still holds the club record for the fastest goal scored for the club, which he set on 23 October 1954 against Charlton Athletic, after just fifteen seconds.

After leaving Cardiff in 1956, he released his autobiography I Lead the Attack in which he revealed that he was involved in an illegal-payments scandal while at Sunderland, with the club attempting to circumvent the maximum wage at the time by offering payments and other incentives to players. Ford detailed several ways that Sunderland's board of directors had attempted to add extra bonuses such as offering houses for free or at hugely reduced costs to players and the free installation of new kitchen appliances whenever needed. The revelations saw the club suffer heavy financial penalties and Ford was temporarily suspended from the game. However, he maintained that he never regretted releasing the book. Following his suspension, Ford initially announced his retirement from football at the age of 33 but decided to come out of retirement in 1957. With the suspension in place, he was forced to look overseas for a club, signing for Dutch club PSV Eindhoven who were managed by Englishman George Hardwick at the time. Despite averaging a goal nearly every other game, Ford was largely in the shadow of one of the PSV's all-time greats in Coen Dillen during his spell with the club and failed to win a trophy during his three-year stint in Holland. He eventually won his case for reinstatement, returning to The Football League with a brief spell at Newport County in the Third Division. He ended a long career playing his football at Romford. In 1955, Ford also guest appeared for Southern Premier League side Gloucester City.

== International career ==
Ford made his first appearance for Wales on 4 May 1946 in a 1–0 defeat to Northern Ireland in a wartime international. He won his first official cap soon after, making a goal scoring debut in Wales' first official international since the end of the war, a 3–1 victory over Scotland in 1946–47 British Home Championship at the Racecourse Ground in Wrexham. He missed the following match of the competition against England but returned to the side for the final match of the competition, scoring Wales' goal in a 2–1 defeat to Ireland. He continued his scoring start for Wales with another goal against Scotland in the following British Home Championship in 1947, his third goal in his first three matches for his country.

He would go on to score 23 times for Wales, including a hat-trick against Belgium in 1949 and braces against England (twice), Portugal, Switzerland and Yugoslavia. He won his final cap on 20 October 1950, scoring in a 2–2 draw with Scotland. His total of 23 goals was a record for Wales at the time before being equaled by Ivor Allchurch and eventually surpassed by Ian Rush and Gareth Bale. However, Ford's tally of 38 caps during his career was significantly lower than either Rush or Allchurch, who gained 73 and 68 caps respectively. In 1958, Wales qualified for the FIFA World Cup for the first time in their history but Ford was serving his suspension from the British game which meant he was overlooked for selection and was not included in the Welsh squad for the 1958 World Cup.

== Style of play ==
During his career, Ford developed a reputation as an immensely physical centre-forward, especially toward opposition goalkeepers. His Wales international teammate John Charles commented on his playing style, stating that "He used to bang everybody and knock them out of the way, he was never frightened" but also described him as a wonderful person. Former England international Gil Merrick accused Ford of maltreating goalkeepers in his autobiography, although Ford later sued Merrick, stating that he had never been cautioned or sent off over his style of play, and received an apology and the withdrawal of the book over the claim. Ford himself stated that his personality was transformed once he stepped onto a football pitch, describing himself as "Like an animal" but also commenting that he was simply "doing his job and doing it well" Billy Bingham later stated "He got some terrible knocks from goalkeepers but he also knew how to dish it out and he never complained to refs".

Bingham also stated that Ford was "the bravest player I ever played with" and described his physical condition, remarking "the two of us would lift weights, and I don't think he broke a sweat while I was struggling to lift some of them". Away from his physicality, Ford was also noted for his immense work rate and accurate finishing.

== Cricket career ==
Ford was a keen cricketer from an early age and would often turn out for a team representing Aston Villa against local sides. In 1955, he turned out for Glamorgan Cricket Club in a charity benefit match for Allan Watkins against Abergavenny Cricket Club, playing alongside players such as Gilbert Parkhouse, Jim Pressdee and Harold Gimblett. His Wales international teammates Billy Lucas and Alf Sherwood were also due to play in the match.

In August 1968, at the age of 44, Ford, who had represented Wales at schoolboy level at cricket, briefly acted as a substitute fielder for Glamorgan in their County Championship match against Nottinghamshire at St. Helen's, Swansea in the match during which Sir Garfield Sobers hit his world record six sixes from an over bowled by Malcolm Nash. Holidaying in south Wales at the time and a spectator at the game, Ford volunteered to field for Glamorgan after Ossie Wheatley left the match due to injury during the lunch interval. Ford remarked to Glamorgan captain Tony Lewis "Give me some kit and I'll play". Ford entered the field of play following the resumption of the game and fielded for half-an-hour.

== After football ==
Following his retirement, Ford entered the car trade and worked in garages in Cardiff, Swansea and Sunderland. The garage he ran in Cardiff was the Tivoli garage on Station Road in Llandaff North. He died at Singleton Hospital in his native Swansea on 29 May 2003 at the age of 79 and was buried in Oystermouth Cemetery.

== Career statistics ==
=== Club ===
Appearances and goals by club, season and competition
Club	Season	League			FA Cup		Other (Note: Includes Welsh Cup.)		Total	
Club	Season	Division	Apps	Goals	Apps	Goals	Apps	Goals	Apps	Goals
Swansea Town	1946–47	Second Division	16	9	0	0	0	0	16	9
Aston Villa	1946–47	First Division	9	9	0	0	0	0	9	9
Aston Villa	1947–48	First Division	35	18	1	0	0	0	36	18
Aston Villa	1948–49	First Division	31	13	4	1	0	0	35	14
Aston Villa	1949–50	First Division	36	18	3	0	0	0	39	18
Aston Villa	1950–51	First Division	9	2	0	0	0	0	9	2
Aston Villa	Total		120	60	8	1	0	0	128	61
Sunderland	1950–51	First Division	26	16	5	1	0	0	31	17
Sunderland	1951–52	First Division	39	22	2	0	0	0	41	22
Sunderland	1952–53	First Division	31	20	2	2	0	0	33	22
Sunderland	1953–54	First Division	12	9	0	0	0	0	12	9
Sunderland	Total		108	67	9	3	0	0	117	70
Cardiff City	1953–54	First Division	19	6	2	2	2	1	23	9
Cardiff City	1954–55	First Division	36	19	1	0	2	4	39	23
Cardiff City	1955–56	First Division	27	13	2	1	5	8	34	22
Cardiff City	1956–57	First Division	14	4	0	0	0	0	14	14
Cardiff City	Total		96	42	5	3	9	13	110	68
PSV Eindhoven	1957–58	Eredivisie	20	9			0	0	20	9
PSV Eindhoven	1958–59	Eredivisie	10	3			0	0	10	3
PSV Eindhoven	1959–60	Eredivisie	28	8			0	0	28	8
PSV Eindhoven	Total		58	20			0	0	58	20
Newport County	1960–61	Third Division	8	3			0	0	8	3
Career total			406	201	22	7	9	13	438	231

== Honours ==
Cardiff City

- Welsh Cup: 1955–56
