= List of Cardiff City F.C. managers =

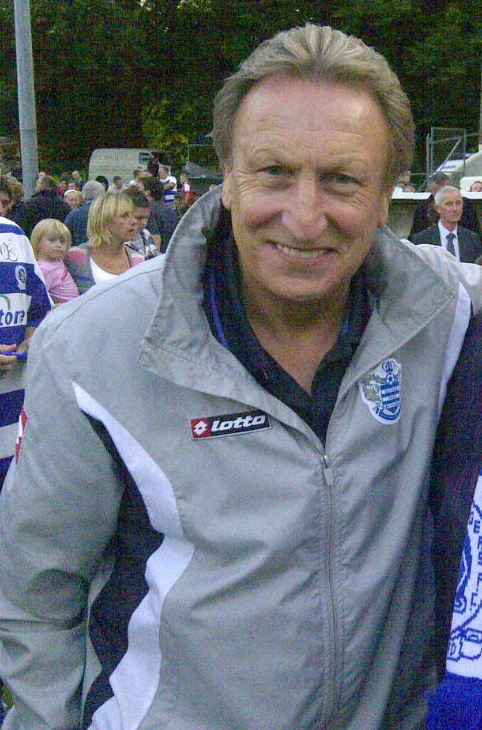
Neil Warnock managed Cardiff City from 2016 to 2019.

Cardiff City Football Club is a professional association football club based in Cardiff, Wales. The club was founded in 1899 as Riverside A.F.C. by members of a local cricket team. The team played in Welsh amateur leagues until turning professional in 1910 and joining the Southern Football League. Ten years later, Cardiff were elected into The Football League.

The team was initially selected by a committee made up of the club's board members. Davy McDougall was the first manager in the club's history, being appointed in 1910 for the team's inaugural season in the Southern Football League. He was replaced after one season by Fred Stewart who oversaw the club's entry into The Football League and promotion to the First Division. Stewart also led the side to victories in the 1927 FA Cup Final and 1927 FA Charity Shield before stepping down in 1933. Billy McCandless was the first Cardiff manager to win a league title when he led his side to first place in the 1946–47 Third Division South.

In the 1960s, Cardiff entered European competition for the first time and manager Jimmy Scoular led the team to the semi-final of the UEFA Cup Winners' Cup in 1968. The club experienced a downturn in fortunes in the late 1970s and 1980s, culminating in relegation to the Fourth Division under Alan Durban. A gradual improvement in the 1990s included both Frank Burrows and Eddie May achieving promotions during their tenures. Financial investment after 2000 saw the club reach the First Division under Lennie Lawrence before returning to the top tier of English football, the Premier League, for the first time in 52 years under Malky Mackay in 2012.

As of December 2025, there has been a total of 42 managers and 9 caretaker managers. Kenny Hibbitt has had the most spells at the club, taking the job on three occasions. Three managers, Len Ashurst, Eddie May, Cyril Spiers, have taken the job on two occasions. The longest serving and most successful manager is Fred Stewart who was in charge for 22 years, won seven cups and achieved promotion twice. Brian Barry-Murphy is the current manager of Cardiff as of 2 May 2026.

== History ==
=== 1899–1939 ===
Founded in 1899, Cardiff City initially began playing in local amateur leagues, the Cardiff & District League and later the South Wales Amateur League. During this time, the team was chosen by the members of the club's board. The club turned professional in 1910 and joined the newly formed Second Division of the Southern Football League. The committee decided that the move required the appointment of a full-time manager to run the first team and hired Davy McDougall to become the first manager in the club's history. McDougall, who was still an active player at the time and was also the captain of the first team, led the side to a fourth-place finish during his first season. Despite this positive start, the club's board decided to look for a more experienced man to lead the team, hiring Stockport County manager Fred Stewart. He quickly overhauled the playing squad, retaining only four of the players he inherited from McDougall, and within two seasons he led the club to the First Division of the Southern League and its first Welsh Cup triumph. In 1920, Cardiff was elected to the Second Division of The Football League and Stewart led the team to second place, resulting in promotion to the First Division, becoming the first Welsh team to reach the top tier of English football.

Stewart established the club in the First Division with two top ten finishes before achieving second-place in the 1923–24 season, missing out on winning the title on goal average in the narrowest margin of victory in English professional football history. Stewart's Cardiff side became the first Welsh team to reach the final of the FA Cup the following season, losing the 1925 final 1–0 to Sheffield United. Two years later, he returned to the final with Cardiff where they defeated Arsenal in the 1927 final to become the only non-English team to win the competition. The club's proceeds from its cup victories were used on ground improvements which left Stewart with little funds to reinvest in the playing squad and, two years after the cup triumph, the side were relegated from the First Division. The club's decline continued with relegation to the Third Division South in 1932. When Stewart could only achieve a 19th-place finish in his first season in the bottom tier, he retired from his position to concentrate on his business interests.

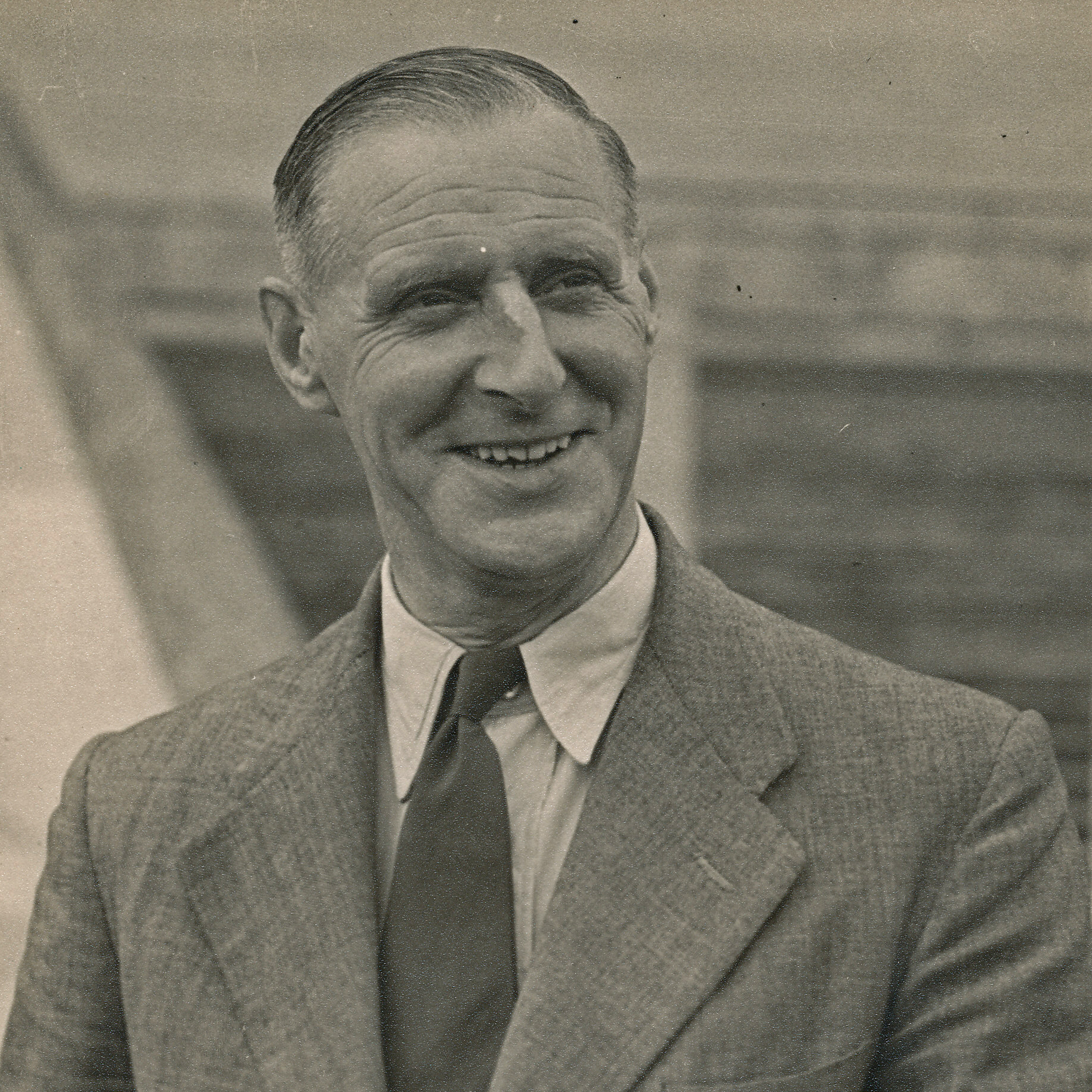
Cyril Spiers was the last manager of the club prior to World War II.

Club founder Walter Bartley Wilson was chosen as Stewart's replacement but was unable to improve the team's fortunes and was replaced after less than a year in charge by Ben Watts-Jones. In an attempt to reinvigorate the playing squad, Watts-Jones brought in 17 new players ahead of his first full season and he was able to gradually improve on results. He remained in charge until April 1937 when he stepped down and was replaced by a member of his coaching staff, Billy Jennings. The club were struggling financially at the time and a fire that destroyed the main stand at Ninian Park meant that Jennings had little money to bring players in and, in April 1939, he was replaced by Cyril Spiers.

=== 1939–1995 ===
Spiers had previously been assistant manager under Frank Buckley at Wolverhampton Wanderers, but his move to Cardiff was his first managerial appointment. However, the outbreak of World War II led to The Football League being suspended for the duration of hostilities. Spiers used the time to establish several local feeder clubs for Cardiff to nurture young players but left the club prior to the resumption of League football after falling out with the board. Spiers had agreed to take a cut in wages during Wartime, but the Cardiff board refused to restore his original wages after the end of the war. Billy McCandless was hastily appointed and reaped the benefits of a Cardiff side much improved from the pre-war side as the team won the Third Division South title by seven points and scored 93 goals. McCandless left the club after just three months of the following season to take charge of Cardiff's South Wales rivals Swansea Town.

The board were able to persuade Spiers to rejoin the club, and he led a side built around players brought through by his youth system to the First Division in 1952. After two seasons in the top tier, Spiers left the club to take over at Crystal Palace. He was replaced by Trevor Morris, a former Cardiff player whose career had been ended due to a broken leg sustained in a wartime friendly. Morris claimed his only silverware during the 1955–56 season by winning the Welsh Cup but was unable to prevent the club's relegation from the First Division the following year. He left the club in 1958 to manage Swansea Town and was replaced by his assistant, Bill Jones, who had previously managed Barry Town and Worcester City. Jones led the team back to the First Division in 1960 where they spent two years before being relegated. After a disappointing start on their return to the Second Division, Jones left the club. Jimmy Scoular was appointed as Jones' replacement but suffered a difficult start after failing to win any of his first 12 matches in charge. Although Scoular never won promotion during his nine years in charge, his spell at the club coincided with its first entries into European competition in the UEFA Cup Winners' Cup by winning the Welsh Cup, a feat he achieved seven times during his tenure. He led the team to the semi-final of the Cup Winners' Cup during the 1967–68 season, the furthest a Welsh team has ever advanced in a continental competition, but continued struggles in the league saw him dismissed in November 1973 during his tenth season in charge.

Lew Clayton was appointed caretaker manager for a single match before Frank O'Farrell joined the club. However, O'Farrell departed after 158 days in charge after being appointed manager of the Iran national side. First team coach Jimmy Andrews took over as caretaker manager and impressed after ensuring the club avoided relegation at the end of the 1973–74 season. He was given the role on a permanent basis only to suffer relegation to the Third Division in his first season but was able to win promotion a year later. Andrews remained in charge until November 1978 before being dismissed. Former player Richie Morgan was appointed as caretaker manager and was eventually appointed on a permanent basis, becoming the youngest manager in the club's history at 34. Despite three relatively comfortable seasons during a difficult financial period, Morgan was moved into a general manager role with Graham Williams taking over the first team role. However, the pair were dismissed after less than five months after failing to win in eight consecutive matches. Len Ashurst was unable to prevent relegation to the Third Division in the final two months of the 1981–82 season but led the team to an immediate return the following year. In March 1984, he left the club after being offered the managerial role at Sunderland. The board appointed coach Jimmy Goodfellow and captain Jimmy Mullen as joint caretaker managers to finish the season before Goodfellow was handed the job permanently at the end of the campaign. However, Goodfellow lasted only two months of his first full season after losing seven of his ten league matches in charge.

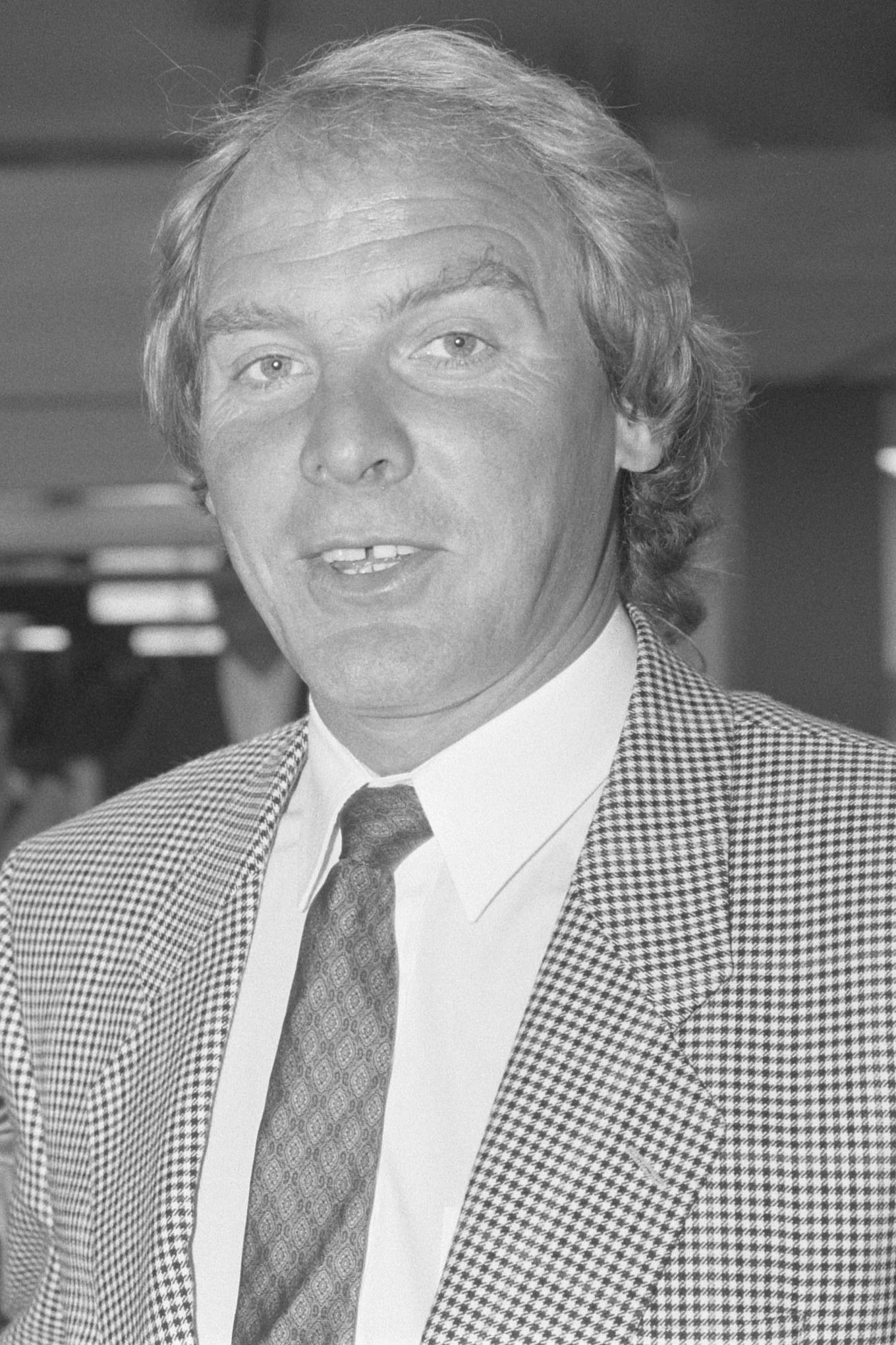
Terry Yorath spent five months as manager during the 1994–95 season.

Alan Durban was appointed in September 1984 but his spell in charge proved disastrous for the club as the team suffered successive relegations, dropping into the Fourth Division. Durban was fired after the second relegation was confirmed and replaced by Frank Burrows who won promotion in his second season. Burrows moved on in 1989 to take up an assistant manager role at Portsmouth. Eddie May replaced Burrows and spent three seasons in charge, becoming one of the most popular managers in the club's history. May led the club to the Third Division title in the 1992–93 season and also won the Welsh Cup but was sacked in November 1994 as the club struggled against relegation. Former Wales manager Terry Yorath took control of the side but suffered similar difficulties and May was brought back in March 1995 in an unsuccessful attempt to avoid relegation, leaving the club for a second time at the end of the campaign.

=== 1995– ===
Kenny Hibbitt was hired in July 1995 but moved into a role as director of football after six months with Phil Neal replacing him. Cardiff finished 22nd in the Third Division during his first season and a poor start to the following campaign saw him sacked. Russell Osman spent two seasons in charge and stabilised the club in the Third Division but was sacked in January 1998 with Hibbitt briefly returning. Frank Burrows was appointed in February 1998 and, nearly ten years after leading the club to promotion in 1988, Burrows again achieved the feat in 1999 as the team reached the Second Division. He endured a disappointing season in the following campaign and was fired in February 2000 with the team in the relegation zone. Billy Ayre saw out the season but was unable to prevent the team's relegation back to the Third Division.

Lebanese businessman Sam Hammam assumed control of the club in 2000 and replaced Ayre with Bobby Gould, who had managed Hammam's previous club Wimbledon. Gould enjoyed a positive start, remaining unbeaten in his opening nine games, but was replaced by Alan Cork after suffering two consecutive defeats in October 2000. Cork won promotion to the Second Division in 2001 and made several high-profile signings that were financed by Hammam ahead of the following campaign, breaking the club's transfer record twice in three months. However, he resigned his position in February 2002 after coming under pressure due to indifferent form. Lennie Lawrence, who had been working as the club's director of football, took control of the first team following Cork's departure and led the side to two consecutive top six finishes. After suffering defeat in the play-offs in the first season, he won promotion via the 2003 Football League Second Division play-off final in his second. Lawrence achieved a mid-table finish in his first season in the second tier but, after struggling against relegation in his second, he was replaced at the end of the 2004–05 season. Dave Jones was appointed as Lawrence's successor and spent six seasons in charge of the first team and led them to the 2008 FA Cup Final where they suffered defeat to Portsmouth. Jones left the club after losing in the Championship play-offs for the second consecutive season.

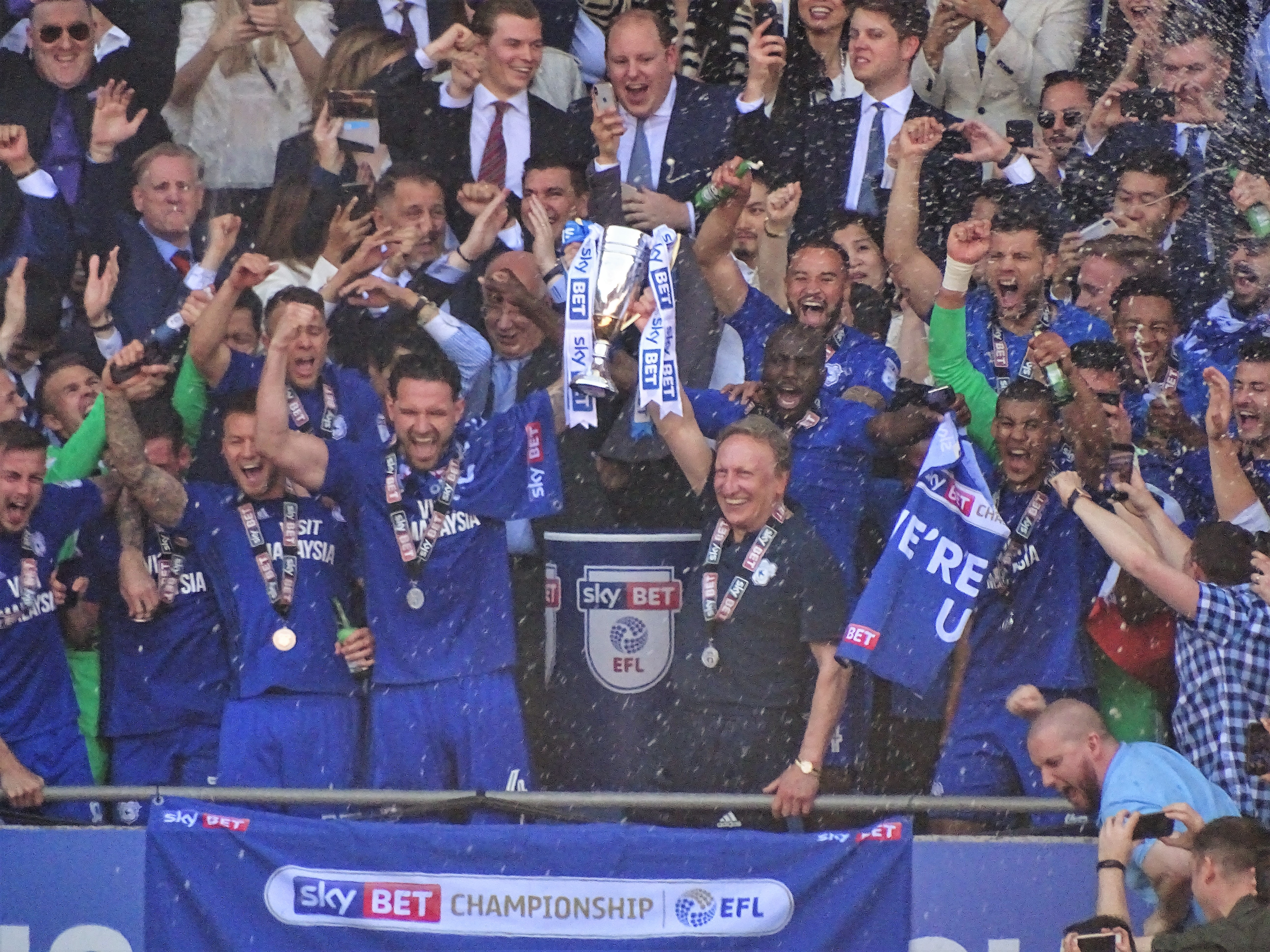
Neil Warnock (holding trophy right) lifts the 2017–18 EFL Championship runner-up trophy with Sean Morrison

Cardiff appointed Malky Mackay in July 2011 who won promotion back to the top tier of English football for the first time in 52 years in 2013. Mackay was eventually dismissed in December 2013 after continued disagreements with owner Vincent Tan. Mackay's assistant David Kerslake remained in charge as a caretaker manager until the appointment of Ole Gunnar Solskjær. He was unable to prevent the club's relegation from the Premier League, and a poor start to the following campaign led to his dismissal in September 2014. Coach Scott Young and player Danny Gabbidon were appointed as joint caretaker managers, remaining in place for five matches until Russell Slade was appointed. Slade achieved two midtable finishes but proved unpopular with fans and was replaced by Paul Trollope, a member of his coaching staff. Trollope was sacked after winning only two of his eleven matches in charge. Neil Warnock was appointed in his place and after a midtable finish in his first season, he led the side to promotion to the Premier League. However, the club finished 18th the following season and returned to the Championship. After a disappointing start to the following season, Warnock resigned from the role on 11 November 2019. Neil Harris was appointed as his replacement five days later. He led the club to the Championship play-off semi-finals but was dismissed midway through the following season after losing six consecutive games.

== Key ==
- All first-team matches in national and continental competition are counted, except the abandoned 1939–40 Football League season and matches in wartime leagues and cups. (Note: League and English domestic cup statistics are sourced from Soccerbase. Welsh Cup statistics are sourced from Richard Shepherd and Terry Grandin's club history records.)
- Names of caretaker managers are supplied where known, and the names of caretaker-managers are highlighted in italics and marked with an asterisk (*).
- Names marked with ‡ initially served as a caretaker manager before being appointed on a permanent basis.
- Win percentage is rounded to two decimal places.
- P = matches played; W = matches won; D = matches drawn; L = matches lost; Win % = win percentage

Information correct as of 2 May 2026. Only competitive matches are counted. Wins, losses and draws are results at the final whistle; the results of penalty shoot-outs are not counted.

== List ==
This chronological list comprises all those who have held the position of manager of the first team of Cardiff City. Each manager's entry includes the dates of tenure and the club's overall competitive record (in terms of matches won, drawn and lost), honours won and significant achievements while under his care. Caretaker managers are included, where known, as well as those who have been in permanent charge.

Table of managers, including tenure, record and honours
Name	From	To	P	W	D	L	Win%	Honours	Refs
Davy McDougall	13 September 1910	May 1911	28	15	5	8	53.57		
Fred Stewart	May 1911	6 May 1933	843	376	188	279	44.60	1 Southern Football League Second Division winner, 1 First Division runners-up, 1 Second Division runners-up, 1 FA Cup, 1 FA Charity Shield, 5 Welsh Cups	
Bartley Wilson	6 May 1933	3 March 1934	30	8	5	17	26.67		
Ben Watts-Jones	3 March 1934	2 April 1937	147	43	30	74	29.25		
Billy Jennings	2 April 1937	1 May 1939	99	38	26	35	38.38		
Cyril Spiers	1 May 1939	7 June 1946	10	3	3	4	30.00		
Billy McCandless	10 June 1946	14 November 1947	101	53	21	27	52.48	1 Third Division South winner	
Cyril Spiers	3 December 1947	10 May 1954	285	118	75	92	41.40	1 Second Division runners-up	
Trevor Morris	30 June 1954	23 July 1958	198	66	42	90	33.33	1 Welsh Cup	
Bill Jones	August 1958	10 September 1962	209	84	53	72	40.19	1 Second Division runners-up, 1 Welsh Cup	
George Swindin	30 October 1962	1 May 1964	79	31	17	31	39.24	1 Welsh Cup	
Jimmy Scoular	1 June 1964	7 November 1973	468	175	123	170	37.39	7 Welsh Cups	
Lew Clayton*	7 November 1973	13 November 1973	1	0	0	1	0.00		
Frank O'Farrell	13 November 1973	30 April 1974	30	11	10	9	36.67	1 Welsh Cup	
Jimmy Andrews ‡	May 1974	6 November 1978	209	76	54	79	36.36	1 Third Division runners-up, 2 Welsh Cups	
Richie Morgan ‡	6 November 1978	9 November 1981	110	40	24	46	36.36		
Graham Williams	9 November 1981	28 February 1982	22	8	4	10	36.36		
Len Ashurst	3 March 1982	4 March 1984	95	43	17	35	45.26	1 Third Division runners-up	
Jimmy Mullen & Jimmy Goodfellow * (Note: Jimmy Mullen and Jimmy Goodfellow were appointed as joint caretaker managers, but Goodfellow later was appointed on a permanent basis.)	4 March 1984	4 April 1984	12	4	4	4	33.33		
Jimmy Goodfellow ‡	4 May 1984	23 September 1984	11	2	0	9	18.18		
Alan Durban	23 September 1984	1 May 1986	93	25	18	50	26.88		
Jimmy Mullen *	1 May 1986	21 May 1986	1	0	0	1	0.00		
Frank Burrows	23 May 1986	28 August 1989	178	73	49	56	41.01	1 Fourth Division runners-up, 1 Welsh Cup	
Len Ashurst	31 August 1989	11 May 1991	103	34	32	37	33.01		
Eddie May	11 July 1991	28 November 1994	190	83	47	60	43.68	1 Third Division, 2 Welsh Cups	
Terry Yorath	November 1994	30 March 1995	43	10	9	24	23.26		
Eddie May	30 March 1995	May 1995	11	3	3	5	27.27		
Kenny Hibbitt	21 July 1995	26 January 1996	26	7	8	11	26.92		
Phil Neal	26 January 1996	7 October 1996	29	8	6	15	27.59		
Kenny Hibbitt *	7 October 1996	11 November 1996	8	4	2	2	50.00		
Russell Osman	11 November 1996	23 January 1998	67	22	21	24	32.84		
Kenny Hibbitt	24 January 1998	16 February 1998	6	0	5	1	0.00		
Frank Burrows	16 February 1998	1 February 2000	107	36	34	37	33.64	1 Third Division third place	
Billy Ayre	2 February 2000	25 August 2000	20	5	8	7	25.00		
Bobby Gould	25 August 2000	16 October 2000	9	2	5	2	22.22		
Alan Cork	16 October 2000	17 February 2002	68	33	18	17	48.53	1 Third Division runners-up	
Lennie Lawrence	18 February 2002	25 May 2005	174	72	50	52	41.38	1 Second Division Play-Offs, 1 FAW Premier Cup	
Dave Jones	25 May 2005	30 May 2011	315	132	84	99	41.90		
Malky Mackay	17 June 2011	27 December 2013	125	54	37	34	43.20	1 Championship winner	
David Kerslake *	27 December 2013	2 January 2014	2	0	1	1	0.00		
Ole Gunnar Solskjær	2 January 2014	18 September 2014	30	9	5	16	30.00		
Danny Gabbidon & Scott Young * (Note: Danny Gabbidon and Scott Young were appointed as joint caretaker managers.)	18 September 2014	5 October 2014	5	1	2	2	20.00		
Russell Slade	5 October 2014	7 May 2016	86	32	27	27	37.21		
Paul Trollope	18 May 2016	4 October 2016	12	2	2	8	16.67		
Neil Warnock	5 October 2016	11 November 2019	144	59	29	56	40.97	1 Championship runners-up	
Neil Harris	16 November 2019	21 January 2021	62	24	17	21	38.71		
Mick McCarthy	22 January 2021	23 October 2021	38	14	11	13	36.84		
Steve Morison	29 October 2021	18 September 2022	45	16	8	21	35.56		
Mark Hudson	18 September 2022	14 January 2023	18	4	7	7	22.22		
Dean Whitehead *	14 January 2023	27 January 2023	2	0	0	2	0.00		
Sabri Lamouchi	27 January 2023	16 May 2023	18	6	2	10	33.33		
Erol Bulut	3 June 2023	22 September 2024	58	21	7	30	36.21		
Omer Riza	22 September 2024	18 April 2025	40	10	15	15	25.00		
Aaron Ramsey *	19 April 2025	1 July 2025	3	0	2	1	0.00		
Brian Barry-Murphy	1 July 2025		55	33	10	12	60.00		
