= Alf Sherwood =

Welsh footballer (1923-1990)

Personal information
- Full name: Alfred Thomas Sherwood
- Date of birth: 13 November 1923
- Place of birth: Aberaman, Wales
- Date of death: 12 March 1990 (aged 66)
- Place of death: Cowbridge, Wales
- Height: 5 ft 8 in (1.73 m)
- Position: Defender

Senior career*
Years	Team	Apps	(Gls)
1940–1942	Aberaman Athletic		
1942–1956	Cardiff City	354	(14)
1956–1961	Newport County	205	(21)
1961–1963	Barry Town		
Total		559	(35)

International career
1946–1956	Wales	41	(0)

Managerial career
- 1961–1963: Barry Town (player-manager)
- * Club domestic league appearances and goals

Alfred Thomas Sherwood (13 November 1923 – 12 March 1990) was a Welsh international footballer. Between 1947 and 1957, he gained a total of 41 caps, the first on his 23rd birthday, against England in 1946.

Known as the King of the sliding tacklers, Sherwood was an ex-miner who threw his all into the game especially when facing the England forward, Stanley Matthews, who described him as "the most difficult opponent he ever played against". His qualities were pace, sureness of tackle and a great positional sense. Sherwood also captained Wales to a famous win over England in 1955.

== Early life ==
Sherwood was born in North View Terrace, a short distance away from the ground of his hometown club Aberaman Athletic. As a youngster, Sherwood was a youth international for Wales at both football and cricket, playing alongside Trevor Ford and Gilbert Parkhouse, before becoming one of the Bevin Boys, a scheme created by former Minister of Labour and National Service Ernest Bevin, in which young men aged between 18 and 25 were drafted to work as miners during World War II.

== Career ==
Sherwood joined Cardiff City in 1942, from Aberaman Athletic after impressing then manager Cyril Spiers in a wartime friendly. He originally played as a wing half but during a match against Lovells Athletic the club was short of defenders so Sherwood was moved to full-back where he was so impressive that he played the position for the rest of his career. In total he played in 140 wartime fixtures for the club. The Football League returned for the 1946–47 season and Sherwood missed just one match as the club finished top of the third division south. Following the departure of Fred Stansfield, he formed a full back partnership with another Cardiff City great, Ron Stitfall, and in the 1951–52 season Sherwood was appointed captain of the club, leading them back to the first division that year.

Sherwood was also the stand in goalkeeper for both club and country, due to substitutes having not yet been introduced. His greatest goalkeeping moment came on 17 April 1954 in a match against Liverpool. Goalkeeper Ron Howells fractured his thumb while making a save during the match and Sherwood took over in his place, facing a penalty from Scottish international Billy Liddell from which he performed a double save to all but assure Liverpool of relegation. Sherwood went on to become one of the all-time appearance leaders for the club in all competitions before he was allowed to leave the club by manager Trevor Morris, to join Newport County, in 1956 at the age of 33. He went on to confound critics by playing in over 200 matches for Newport as well as adding his last two Wales caps at the club. He was selected to play in the Third Division South representative team in 1957. After leaving Newport in 1961 he had a short-lived spell as player-manager of Barry Town.

In 2006, he was inducted into the Welsh Sports Hall of Fame.

== After football ==
After retiring from football and working for the National Coal Board as a security officer. He died of a heart attack at Llantrisant & Pontyclun golf club on 10 March 1990.

== Honours ==
Cardiff City

- Football League Division Three South Winner: 1

1946–47

- Football League Division Two Runner-up: 1

1951–52
