= 1960–61 Newport County A.F.C. season =

Welsh association football club season

Newport County
1960–61 season
- Manager: Billy Lucas
- Stadium: Somerton Park
- Third Division: 13th
- FA Cup: 1st round
- Football League Cup: 1st round
- Welsh Cup: 6th round
- Top goalscorer: League: K.McPherson (20); All: K.McPherson (22)
- Highest home attendance: 9,232 vs Grimsby Town (26 September 1960)
- Lowest home attendance: 2,785 vs Shrewsbury Town (3 April 1961)
- Average home league attendance: 5,371
Home colours	Away colours

The 1960–61 season was Newport County's third consecutive season in the Football League Third Division since the end of regionalisation in 1958. It was their 32nd season in the third tier and 33rd competitive season overall in the Football League.

== Season review ==
=== Results summary ===
Overall								Home						Away					
Pld	W	D	L	GF	GA	GAv	Pts	W	D	L	GF	GA	Pts	W	D	L	GF	GA	Pts
46	17	11	18	81	90	0.9	45	12	7	4	51	30	31	5	4	14	30	60	14

Source: rsssf.com

=== Results by round ===
Round	1	2	3	4	5	6	7	8	9	10	11	12	13	14	15	16	17	18	19	20	21	22	23	24	25	26	27	28	29	30	31	32	33	34	35	36	37	38	39	40	41	42	43	44	45	46
Ground	H	A	A	H	H	A	A	H	H	A	A	H	H	H	A	A	A	H	A	A	H	A	A	A	H	H	A	H	H	A	A	H	H	A	H	H	H	A	H	H	A	H	A	A	A	H
Result	W	L	L	W	W	D	L	W	D	L	D	D	W	D	W	W	D	W	L	W	W	D	L	L	L	W	L	W	W	W	L	W	W	L	L	L	D	L	D	D	L	L	L	L	W	D
Position	8	13	18	11	10	8	13	9	10	11	11	11	11	12	10	9	8	10	11	9	7	7	9	10	11	10	12	11	11	9	8	8	7	7	7	8	8	9	10	10	10	13	13	14	13	13

Updated to match(es) played on 29 Apr 1961. Source: statto.com
A = Away; H = Home; W = Win; D = Draw; L = Loss

== Fixtures and results ==
=== Third Division ===
Date	Opponents	Venue	Result	Scorers	Attendance
20 Aug 1960	Reading	H	5–2	Singer 3, Dixon, McPherson	8,586
22 Aug 1960	Hull City	A	1–5	Burton	9,811
27 Aug 1960	Coventry City	A	1–4	McPherson	11,819
29 Aug 1960	Hull City	H	3–1	Singer 2, Riggs	7,306
3 Sep 1960	Bristol City	H	4–1	McPherson, Fry	8,538
6 Sep 1960	Walsall	A	2–2	Singer, OG	6,700
10 Sep 1960	Queens Park Rangers	A	0–2		7,301
15 Sep 1960	Walsall	H	4–2	McSeveney 2, Singer 2	5,585
17 Sep 1960	Notts County	H	2–2	McSeveney, Singer	7,779
20 Sep 1960	Grimsby Town	A	1–2	OG	12,288
24 Sep 1960	Bournemouth & Boscombe Athletic	A	2–2	Meyer 2	8,507
26 Sep 1960	Grimsby Town	H	1–1	Dixon	9,232
1 Oct 1960	Bradford City	H	1–0	Meyer	4,547
8 Oct 1960	Halifax Town	H	1–1	McPherson	3,698
15 Oct 1960	Tranmere Rovers	A	4–2	Meyer 2, Sherwood, McPherson	7,827
29 Oct 1960	Brentford	A	4–2	Burton 2, McSeveney, McPherson	7,600
12 Nov 1960	Torquay United	A	0–0		6,875
5 Dec 1960	Chesterfield	H	5–1	Burton, McSeveney, Ford, OG 2	6,713
10 Dec 1960	Bury	A	1–4	Ford	7,349
17 Dec 1960	Reading	A	3–2	McPherson, Fry, Meyer	5,780
22 Dec 1960	Colchester United	H	3–2	Burton 2, Meyer	6,186
26 Dec 1960	Colchester United	A	1–1	McPherson	6,732
7 Jan 1961	Southend United	A	2–4	Burton, McPherson	6,037
14 Jan 1961	Bristol City	A	0–3		11,886
23 Jan 1961	Queens Park Rangers	H	1–3	Ford	6,610
28 Jan 1961	Swindon Town	H	2–0	McSeveny, McPherson	3,350
4 Feb 1961	Notts County	A	0–6		10,673
11 Feb 1961	Bournemouth & Boscombe Athletic	H	2–0	McPherson, Meyer	3,790
13 Feb 1961	Port Vale	H	2–1	McPherson, Smith	5,100
18 Feb 1961	Bradford City	A	2–1	Dixon, Meyer	8,820
25 Feb 1961	Chesterfield	A	0–1		3,586
4 Mar 1961	Tranmere Rovers	H	1–0	Meyer	4,608
6 Mar 1961	Watford	H	5–1	McPherson 3, Smith, Meyer	5,208
11 Mar 1961	Watford	A	1–4	Rowland	9,188
13 Mar 1961	Barnsley	H	2–3	McPherson 2	6,198
18 Mar 1961	Brentford	H	0–1		3,756
20 Mar 1961	Coventry City	H	3–3	Meyer 2, Sherwood	3,660
25 Mar 1961	Swindon Town	A	0–2		7,904
1 Apr 1961	Torquay United	H	2–2	Sherwood, McSeveney	3,872
3 Apr 1961	Shrewsbury Town	H	1–1	McSeveney	2,785
8 Apr 1961	Port Vale	A	1–3	McSeveney	6,302
15 Apr 1961	Southend United	H	1–2	Sherwood	2,917
17 Apr 1961	Shrewsbury Town	A	0–5		5,877
22 Apr 1961	Halifax Town	A	1–2	McPherson	3,589
24 Apr 1961	Barnsley	A	3–1	McSeveney, Smith, Derrick	4,025
29 Apr 1961	Bury	H	0–0		3,523

=== FA Cup ===
Round	Date	Opponents	Venue	Result	Scorers	Attendance
1	5 Nov 1960	Shrewsbury Town	A	1–4	McSeveney	11,496

=== Football League Cup ===
Round	Date	Opponents	Venue	Result	Scorers	Attendance
1	10 Oct 1960	Southampton	H	2–2	McSeveney, McPherson	7,834
1r	17 Oct 1960	Southampton	A	2–2 a.e.t.	McSeveney, Smith	8,000
1r2	26 Oct 1960	Southampton	A	3–5	Burton 3	8,414

=== Welsh Cup ===
Round	Date	Opponents	Venue	Result	Scorers	Attendance
5	2 Feb 1961	Abergavenny Thursdays	A	3–1	Dixon, McPherson, Smith	
6	16 Feb 1961	Cardiff City	A	1–2	Meyer	12,192

== League table ==
Pos	Team	Pld	W	D	L	GF	GA	GAv	Pts
11	Hull City	46	17	12	17	73	73	1.000	46
12	Torquay United	46	14	17	15	75	83	0.904	45
13	Newport County	46	17	11	18	81	90	0.900	45
14	Bristol City	46	17	10	19	70	68	1.029	44
15	Coventry City	46	16	12	18	80	83	0.964	44
