= Bobby Forrest =

English footballer

Personal information
- Full name: John Robert Forrest
- Date of birth: 13 May 1931
- Place of birth: Rossington, England
- Date of death: 3 May 2005 (aged 73)
- Place of death: Weymouth, England
- Height: 5 ft 10 in (1.78 m)
- Position: Inside forward

Senior career*
Years	Team	Apps	(Gls)
- Rossington Youth Club
- Rossington Miners Welfare
–1952	Retford Town		
1952–1957	Leeds United	119	(36)
1957–1962	Notts County	117	(37)
1962–1968	Weymouth		
1968–1970	Dorchester Town		
Total		236	(73)

Managerial career
- 1968–1970: Dorchester Town
- * Club domestic league appearances and goals

John Robert Forrest (13 May 1931 – 3 May 2005) was an English professional footballer who played as an inside forward. He played in the Football League for Leeds United and Notts County.

== Career ==
Born in Rossington, he attended Rossington Modern School. He became a miner after leaving school and played football for Rossington Youth Club and later Rossington Miners Welfare. He joined Retford Town when he and a friend, who were attending the match as spectators, were asked to play for Retford Town as they were two players short. They were impressed and joined the club permanently following the match.

Forrest was signed by Leeds United in December 1952 for £500. Forest became a popular player at Leeds United, and made 119 league appearances for the club, scoring 36 goals.

He joined Notts County in February 1957, and captained the club to promotion to the Third Division in the 1959–60 season.

He played for Weymouth between 1962 and 1968, making 167 appearances and scoring 47 goals. After leaving Weymouth, he joined Dorchester Town as player-manager where he remained until his retirement in 1970.

== Personal life ==
Following his retirement, he ran a guest house in Weymouth, where former team-mate and England international Jack Charlton would regularly stay.

He died on 3 May 2005, in Weymouth, after having suffered a stroke a few days earlier.
