= Howard Sheppeard =

Welsh footballer (1933–2021)

Personal information
- Full name: Howard Thomas Sheppeard
- Date of birth: 31 January 1933
- Place of birth: Ynysybwl, Wales
- Date of death: April 2021 (aged 88)
- Place of death: Rhondda Cynon Taff, Wales
- Height: 6 ft 1 in (1.85 m)
- Position: Inside forward

Youth career
- Ynysybwl Juniors
- Gnasyhard Youth Club

Senior career*
Years	Team	Apps	(Gls)
1951–1955	Sunderland	1	(0)
1955–1956	Cardiff City	0	(0)
1956–1958	Newport County	31	(5)
1958–19??	Abergavenny Thursdays		
- * Club domestic league appearances and goals

Howard Thomas Sheppeard (31 January 1933 – April 2021) was a Welsh professional footballer who played as an inside forward for Sunderland. Sheppeard died in Rhondda Cynon Taff in April 2021, at the age of 88.
