= Bobby Ayre =

English footballer (1932–2018)

Personal information
- Full name: Robert William Ayre
- Date of birth: 26 March 1932
- Place of birth: Berwick-upon-Tweed, England
- Date of death: 31 July 2018 (aged 86)
- Place of death: Leeds, Yorkshire, England
- Position: Centre forward

Senior career*
| Years | Team | Apps | (Gls) |
- Chippenham Town
| 1952–1958 | Charlton Athletic | 109 | (48) |
| 1958–1960 | Reading | 57 | (24) |
| 1960–1961 | Weymouth | 15 | (7) |
| Total | | 166 | (72) |

International career
| | England U23 | 2 | (1) |
- * Club domestic league appearances and goals

Robert William Ayre (26 March 1932 – 31 July 2018) was an English professional footballer who played as a centre forward in the Football League.
