= Alfie Stokes =

English footballer

Personal information
- Date of birth: 3 October 1932
- Place of birth: Hackney, England
- Date of death: 30 March 2002 (aged 69)
- Place of death: Worthing, England
- Position: Forward

Senior career*
Years	Team	Apps	(Gls)
1953–1958	Tottenham Hotspur	65	(40)
1959–1959	Fulham	15	(6)
	Cambridge City	?	(?)
1961–1961	Watford	14	(2)
1964	St. George Budapest		
1965–1966	Stevenage Town		
- * Club domestic league appearances and goals

Alfie Stokes (3 October 1932 – 30 March 2002 in Worthing). Born in Hackney and educated at the Parmiter's School he was a professional footballer who played for Tottenham Hotspur, Fulham, Cambridge City, Watford and represented England at England B and schoolboy level.

== Football career ==
Stokes joined Tottenham from non-league side Clapton in February 1953. He scored on his debut in a 3–2 win over Bolton Wanderers at Burnden Park in April 1953. The prolific goal scorer found the net on 42 occasions in 69 appearances in all competitions for the club. In September 1957, Stokes scored five goals in a 7–1 win over Birmingham City at White Hart Lane-equalling a Football League record

He transferred to Fulham in July 1959 for a £9.000 transfer deal and featured in 15 games and scoring six times for the West London club.

After a spell with Cambridge City, Stokes joined Watford in April 1961 where he went on to play 14 matches and finding the net on two occasions.

== After football ==
Stokes emigrated to Sydney, Australia and turned out for local team St George Budapest in the Forst division of new South Wales. He returned to the UK and played for Stevenage Town in the Southern League, joining up with former Tottenham team-mate Johnny Brooks there, while he settled in Homerton in the London Borough of Hackney and later was employed as a chauffeur. Stokes died in Worthing on 30 March 2002.

Between 1969 and 1971 Stokes was the school football coach for pupils attending Hackney Free and Parochial School arranging many inter-school matches for Hackney Schools. Ex-pupil of school
