= Ken Tucker (footballer) =

English footballer

Personal information
- Full name: Kenneth Tucker
- Date of birth: 2 October 1925
- Place of birth: Poplar, London, England
- Date of death: 19 May 2008 (aged 82)
- Place of death: Southend, England
- Position: Winger

Senior career*
Years	Team	Apps	(Gls)
1946–1947	Finchley	?	
1947–1957	West Ham United	83	(31)
1957–1959	Notts County	28	(5)
1959–?	Margate	?	
- * Club domestic league appearances and goals

Ken Tucker (2 October 1925 – 19 May 2008) was an English footballer who played as a left winger.

Signed by Charlie Paynter from Finchley, Tucker made his West Ham United debut in October 1947, scoring a hat-trick at home against Chesterfield. He had first come to the attention of Paynter a year earlier. He had been playing for a local amateur team, Central Park, in an early round FA Cup game. He missed most of the first half due to a delayed train, but hit six second-half goals. This was recorded in the Stratford Express and Ilford Recorder and soon after, he received a letter from Paynter asking for a meeting. Paynter asked Tucker if he would play on loan to Athenian League side Finchley against Leyton the following Saturday and after that game, despite a 3–0 loss, both West Ham and Finchley were after him. Finchley offered him £11 a week, including £5 from the chairman's personal funds, and Tucker accepted this. Paynter allowed "his player" to stay at the club on the proviso that Tucker would sign professional forms with West Ham as soon as the season was over.

After his Hammers debut, Tucker played only 14 games for the first team in the following four years, but he played well in the reserve team, scoring 73 goals in 191 games. He finally became a first-team regular during the 1955–56 season, and was called into the England squad for a game against Brazil although he didn't play.

Tucker had a fractious relationship with manager Ted Fenton – he once went on strike over pay – and his feud lasted well after he had left the club. In an interview with Ex Magazine in April 2006, he said "Ted once told me 'All my troubles here are down to you'. If I felt I wasn't being treated right, I'd rebel – I told it as I saw it".

Tucker was the wealthiest player on the books at West Ham, and was the first to own a car, a Chrysler. He and his wife owned two shops in Barking Road, which he continued to manage once he had retired. He also owned six greyhounds that raced at West Ham Stadium.

He made a total of 93 league and cup appearances during his ten years at West Ham, scoring 31 goals.

He went on to play for Notts County after an acrimonious departure from the east London club in March 1957, although he still insisted on training at West Ham. Two seasons later, he joined non-League Margate where he played alongside former Hammer Almer Hall.

Tucker's older brother, Samual, played for Clapton. His son, Raymond, played for the West Ham youth team under John Lyall during the 1960s.
