= Harry Kirtley =

English footballer

Personal information
- Full name: John Harold Kirtley
- Date of birth: 23 May 1930
- Place of birth: Washington, England
- Date of death: 13 December 2007 (aged 77)
- Place of death: Rhyl, Wales
- Position: Inside forward

Senior career*
Years	Team	Apps	(Gls)
1948–1955	Sunderland	95	(18)
1955–1957	Cardiff City	38	(4)
1957–1960	Gateshead	95	(16)
1960–?	Rhyl		
- * Club domestic league appearances and goals

Harry Kirtley (23 May 1930 – 13 December 2007) was an English footballer who played in The Football League for Sunderland, Cardiff City and Gateshead.

== Club career ==
Kirtley made his debut for Sunderland on 16 April 1949 in a 1–1 tie against Manchester City at Maine Road. In his career at Sunderland, he made 101 appearances and scored 18 goals during 1948 to 1955. From Sunderland he moved to Cardiff City where he scored 4 goals in 38 appearances in one season. He then returned to the North East with Gateshead, he played 96 times and scored 14 goals up to leaving in 1960. He had a short stint with Welsh side Rhyl before retiring, and settled in Rhyl afterwards.

Kirtley died in 2007 and current chairman of Sunderland, Niall Quinn, said "It's always very sad when we lose a member of our Sunderland family."
