= Cecil Dixon (footballer) =

English footballer (1935–2024)

Personal information
- Full name: Cecil Hubert Dixon
- Date of birth: 28 March 1935
- Place of birth: Trowbridge, England
- Date of death: 5 September 2024 (aged 89)
- Position: Outside right

Senior career*
| Years | Team | Apps | (Gls) |
| –1954 | Trowbridge Town | | |
| 1954–1957 | Cardiff City | 21 | (1) |
| 1957–1961 | Newport County | 107 | (15) |
| 1961–1962 | Northampton Town | 15 | (4) |
- * Club domestic league appearances and goals

Cecil Hubert Dixon (28 March 1935 – 5 September 2024) was an English professional footballer. An outside right, he joined Newport County in 1957 from Cardiff City and went on to make 107 appearances for Newport, scoring 15 goals before finishing his career at Northampton Town.

== Career ==
Dixon began his career at his home town club Trowbridge Town. In 1954 he joined First Division side Cardiff City, becoming the first Trowbridge player to ever sign for a Division One club, but struggled to force his way into the side, mainly due to the presence of Gordon Nutt, Mike Tiddy and Brian Walsh, scoring his only goal during a 2–1 defeat to Birmingham City in November 1955. After three years at Ninian Park, Dixon joined Newport County in 1957.

Finishing his professional career after one season with Northampton Town, he emigrated to Australia in 1963. He died in 2024 aged 89.
