= Gilbert Parkhouse =

Welsh cricketer & rugby union footballer (1925–2000)

Personal information
- Full name: William Gilbert Anthony Parkhouse
- Born: 12 October 1925; Swansea, Glamorgan, Wales
- Died: 10 August 2000 (aged 74); Carmarthen, Wales
- Batting: Right-handed
- Bowling: Right-arm medium pace
- Role: Batsman

International information
- National side: England
- Test debut (cap 348): 24 June 1950 v West Indies
- Last Test: 28 July 1959 v India

Domestic team information
- Years: Team
- 1948–1964: Glamorgan
- 1950–1950/51: MCC

Career statistics
Competition	Tests	FC	LA
Matches	7	455	1
Runs scored	373	23,508	17
Batting average	28.69	31.68	17.00
100s/50s	0/2	32/129	0/0
Top score	78	201	17
Balls bowled	0	229	0
Wickets	0	2	0
Bowling average	–	62.50	–
5 wickets in innings	–	0	–
10 wickets in match	–	0	–
Best bowling	–	1/4	–
Catches/stumpings	3/–	324/–	1/–
- Source: CricketArchive, 26 December 2008

William Gilbert Anthony Parkhouse (12 October 1925 – 10 August 2000) was a Welsh cricketer who played in seven Tests for England in 1950, 1950–51 and 1959.

Parkhouse was a right-handed batsman who spent most of his career as an opener for Glamorgan. He also played rugby union for Swansea.

As a cricketer, he was a fast scorer and a stroke-maker. His obituary in Wisden Cricketers' Almanack said: "There were no obvious flaws in technique: he was orthodox, and happy to get on the back foot against both the quicks – he was a skilled hooker – and the slows... It was his effortless cover driving... that is best remembered... and he could on-drive beautifully."

== First-class cricketer ==
Born at Swansea, Wales, Parkhouse was educated at Wycliffe College at Stonehouse in Gloucestershire. Parkhouse appeared in wartime non-first-class matches for Glamorgan and also in fixtures arranged for the 1945 season. Wisden for 1946 called him "a player of splendid natural style".

He made his first-class debut in a pre-season friendly match in 1948, batting at No 3, and remained in that batting position for the whole of the season, which brought Glamorgan's first County Championship. In his first Championship game, against Essex he scored 46 and 59. In mid-season he hit his first century, 117 against Sussex at Swansea, and a week later he hit a second, 103 against Yorkshire at Hull. In his first season as a whole, despite some loss of form in August, he made 1204 runs at an average of 25.07 runs per innings, and was awarded his county cap.

Glamorgan did not retain the Championship in 1949, but Parkhouse improved his figures, making 1491 runs at an average of 33.13. He improved his personal highest score twice in the season, with 126 against Hampshire in the first Championship game of the season and, in early July, 145 on an easy-paced Trent Bridge pitch against Nottinghamshire.

== Test player ==
In the 1950 season, Parkhouse had what Wisden termed an "almost meteoric rise to fame", in which he beat the Glamorgan records for number of centuries in a single season and for the fastest time to 1,000 runs. With opener Phil Clift not available, Glamorgan shuffled the batting line-up around before promoting Parkhouse from No 3 to open with Emrys Davies from early June. The move was an instant success: Parkhouse scored 121 and 148 against Somerset in his first two innings as an opening batsman, the latter his highest score to date. In the next first-class match, he made 127 against Combined Services for three centuries in consecutive innings. And only 10 days later, he hit 161 against Surrey, again bettering his personal best.

This form propelled Parkhouse into the England team for the second Test in the 1950 series against the West Indies, played at Lord's. It was a somewhat makeshift side hit by injury to Denis Compton and late withdrawals by Reg Simpson and Trevor Bailey. Parkhouse batted at No 5 and faced 30 balls without scoring in the first innings against the spin of Sonny Ramadhin and Alf Valentine before Valentine bowled him. The second innings was better: he made 48 out of a partnership of 78 for the fourth wicket with Cyril Washbrook, and was second highest scorer behind Washbrook. The innings won praise from Wisden: "Parkhouse... signalised his first Test with a very good innings, in which he showed encouraging confidence and a variety of strokes until he hit a full toss straight to silly mid off in the last over of the fourth day when wanting only two runs for 50. This mistake came at a time when thoughts were raised that Washbrook might be capable of saving the match if someone could stay with him." The victory was West Indies' first over England in England.

Returning to Glamorgan, Parkhouse equalled his best score with a second innings of 161 within a month, this time against Gloucestershire at Stradey Park, Llanelli. And in the very next game, he went one better, scoring 162 against Worcestershire at Kidderminster in a match ruined by rain.

The third Test, at Trent Bridge, followed the pattern of Parkhouse's previous match, with a disappointing first innings followed by a better second. Batting at No 3, he made 13 in a first-innings collapse that saw England at 25 for four before recovering to 223 all out. After West Indies had replied with 558, Simpson and Washbrook opened England's second innings with a stand of 212, before both were out within a quarter of an hour. "Even then," Wisden reported, "England were far from finished, for (John) Dewes and Parkhouse, without looking as safe as the first pair, batted well, and at one period the score stood 326 for two with England only nine runs behind." But then Parkhouse was out for 69, two other batsmen followed quickly and the match was lost by 10 wickets.

Ten of the 11 England team reconvened at Lord's the next day for the annual Gentlemen v Players match, often an indication of who was in the running for the Test team, and Parkhouse's 81 in the second innings almost won the match for the Players. But when the team for the fourth Test at The Oval was announced, eight of the 11, including Parkhouse, had gone, though in his case, Wisden reported, it was because he had "a bad cold". He missed 10 days of county cricket. In all cricket in the 1950 season, he made 1997 runs at an average of 45.38.

Parkhouse was then chosen for the 1950-51 Ashes series in Australia (and tour of New Zealand) under the captaincy of Freddie Brown. He was not a success. Wisden reported: "For all the polish of some of his off-side play, Parkhouse did not impress against fast bowlers and he was susceptible to the short bouncer. He shared an all-too-common fault of not putting his body right behind the ball when facing a pace attack. In his defence it must be said that illness and injuries kept him out of several key games and restricted the so valuable match practice."

Parkhouse played in only one of the first-class matches before the first Test match, and was not selected for that. He then made 58 and an unbeaten 46 in a four-day match against what was termed "An Australian XI", consisting of Arthur Morris, Keith Miller and Neil Harvey with younger players, most of whom later played Test cricket: Wisden said that Parkhouse despite "useful scores... was not at his best". The two innings got him into the Test team for the second match, played at Melbourne. In the first innings of a low-scoring match, he scored nine in a general collapse of England's upper batting order. In the second innings, batting at No 6, he made 28 as England failed by 29 runs to make a target of just 179. A score of 92, his highest of the tour, in the next match against New South Wales cemented his place in the Test side for the third match, at Sydney. But in yet another defeat for the England team, he made 25 and 15.

With the series already lost, England brought David Sheppard in to replace Parkhouse for the fourth Test, and a combination of limited opportunity and unimpressive scores meant that he did not reclaim a Test place until, on the New Zealand leg of the tour, an injury crisis brought him back to the side for the second of the two-match series. In a low-scoring match, he made 2 and 20.

== County stalwart ==
Parkhouse returned to county cricket with Glamorgan in 1951 and, with the return of Clift as opening batsman, he resumed the No 3 batting position he had held before. By his 1950 standards, he had a modest season, scoring 1282 runs at an average of 27.86 with just two centuries. Wisden noted that he "disappointed" and added: "Lack of confidence against spin bowlers retarded the progress of this young batsman, and the fact that he was no longer opening partner for Emrys Davies may have been another disturbing factor."

In fact, the 1951 season set the pattern for the next eight seasons of Parkhouse's career. In each season from 1951 to 1958, he made his 1000 runs for the year, but he never made more than two centuries in a season, and in 1952 and 1958 he made none at all. His batting average in most of these seasons was around 30, with 1642 runs at 35.69 in 1957 the best year, and 1126 at 24.47 in 1958 the worst. From 1953 he went back to opening the innings, initially, with Emrys Davies, then with Clift or captain Wilf Wooller, finally forming a regular partnership with Bernard Hedges. In 1954, he raised his own highest score with an innings of 182 against Middlesex at Lord's. And two years later, in 1956, he raised it again, to 201, in the match against Kent at Swansea.

== Indian summer ==
The 1959 season saw a significant return to form for Parkhouse, and the style of his batting and the quick runs that he and Hedges made as the county's opening partnership were factors, in Wisden's view, in Glamorgan's rise from the depths of the County Championship in 1958 to challenge for the title. By mid-season, Parkhouse had already made four centuries and, in a season of Test experimentation against a modest Indian side following a disastrous Ashes tour of Australia the previous winter, the England selectors picked him, alongside the young left-handed Lancashire batsman Geoff Pullar, as a new opening partnership for the third Test at Leeds. Wisden reported that the new partnership "proved highly satisfactory". The 146 the pair put on in their first innings together "was England's best start in 26 Tests and the highest for the first wicket against India". Parkhouse made 78 and Pullar 75, and England won by an innings.

Parkhouse and Pullar were retained for the fourth Test, at Old Trafford, and Pullar took advantage to score 131, the first century by a Lancastrian for England on his home ground. Parkhouse mistimed a hook in the first innings and was out for 17. In the second innings after England had not enforced the follow-on, India bowled defensively and the cricket was dull: "Parkhouse and Pullar, both anxious to gain places in the M.C.C. team to tour West Indies [in 1959–60], declined to take risks and the purposeless cricket was derided by the majority of the crowd of 13,000," Wisden reported. Parkhouse made 49, which was the highest score of the innings. But it was his last innings as a Test player: he was replaced for the fifth Test by Raman Subba Row, and was not picked for the winter tour.

Despite this, the 1959 was Parkhouse's best in first-class cricket, surpassing even his 1950 season. He made in all 2243 runs, the only time he passed 2000 runs in a season and his average of 48.76 runs per innings put him ninth on the first-class list for the season among county players.

== Final first-class seasons ==
Normal service resumed for Parkhouse over the next three seasons as he reverted to the 1950s pattern of scoring his 1000 runs for the season, making two centuries (or fewer), and averaging around 30 runs per innings. His 121 against Leicestershire in May 1960 meant that he had scored a century against each of the other 16 first-class counties.

In 1962, his 124 against Cambridge University was his 32nd century for Glamorgan, beating Emrys Davies' county record of 31. But later that season he was dropped for 12 county matches, the first time he had not been selected for Glamorgan when available since his debut in 1948. In 1963, he made only 11 appearances and after half a dozen matches in 1964, he retired from first-class cricket.

After retirement, there was a brief spell as a coach for Worcestershire and then he moved to Edinburgh, where he coached both cricket and rugby at Stewart's Melville College until retirement back to Wales in 1987. He died on 10 August 2000 in Carmarthen, Wales.
