= John McSeveney =

Scottish footballer and manager (1931–2020)

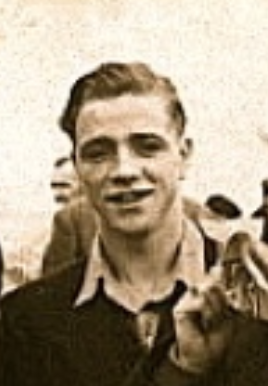

Personal information
- Full name: John Haddow McSeveney
- Date of birth: 8 February 1931
- Place of birth: Shotts, Scotland
- Date of death: 12 December 2020 (aged 89)
- Place of death: Cawthorne, Yorkshire, England
- Position: Winger

Senior career*
Years	Team	Apps	(Gls)
1948–1951	Hamilton Academical	71	(20)
1951–1955	Sunderland	35	(3)
1955–1957	Cardiff City	75	(18)
1957–1961	Newport County	172	(51)
1961–1964	Hull City	183	(70)
Total		536	(162)

Managerial career
- 1971–1972: Barnsley
- 1973: Home Farm
- 1974–1975: Nottingham Forest (assistant)
- 1975–1977: Waterford
- 1976: British Guyana
- 1980–1981: Oman
- 1980-1981: Rotherham United (assistant)
- 1981–1986: Sheffield United (assistant)
- * Club domestic league appearances and goals

John Haddow McSeveney (8 February 1931 – 12 December 2020) was a Scottish footballer and manager.

== Early life and career ==
McSeveney was born in Shotts in 1931, where he began playing football at Calderhead Junior High School. Aged 14 he joined the Shotts YMCA Boys Club alongside his older brother Willie McSeveney being part of a team that won the Scottish YMCA Cup, the Lanarkshire Cup, The Henderson Memorial Shield and the Lanarkshire league. His two younger brothers David and Bobby also played football.

From the YMCA he moved to Carluke Rovers before signing for Hamilton Academicals in 1948 aged just 17. Three years later in October 1951 he made the move from Scottish League B to English First Division transferring to Sunderland for £5750 making his debut against Manchester United. He combined this with part-time work as a mechanic at Wearmouth Colliery. In 1955 he transferred to Cardiff City where he scored 18 goals in two seasons and undertook his National Service working in Nantgarw Colliery. From there he joined Third Division Newport County in 1957 making 172 league appearances and scoring 51 goals. In July 1961, he joined Hull City where he made 183 appearances, scoring 70 goals. and was joined there for a time by younger brother Bobby.

== Post-playing career ==
McSeveney retired from playing while at Hull city in the 1965 close season, and joined the coaching and scouting staff, but he was ambitious and embarked upon a management career.

His first managerial post was at Third Division Barnsley in September 1971. While he managed them for only one season, he settled there with his family and lived in the area for the rest of his life. After a short spell managing Home Farm in Dublin in 1973, McSeveney agreed to return to England in 1974, accepting the position of chief coach to Second Division Nottingham Forest under manager and ex-Scottish international Allan Brown. This was however short-lived, only lasting until Brian Clough replaced Brown in 1975.

In 1976, under McSeveney's management, the Guyana national team entered its first ever World Cup qualification campaign with the aim of reaching the 1978 FIFA World Cup in Argentina. As part of their preparations, they played Scottish team St Mirren who were at that time managed by Alex Ferguson and on a Caribbean tour. Ferguson recounts in his autobiography that he became so frustrated with the rough play that he put himself on as a sub at half time to exact his revenge, and was later sent off by the referee.

McSeveney also managed Waterford in Ireland, persuading Bobby Charlton to play for the side, but he resigned from the job in 1977 due to the impact on his family. He then took a position coaching a team in the United Arab Emirates in 1979 as part of a scheme run by the English F.A. However, he returned home to the more moderate British climate within less than a year and became coach at Rotherham. In 1981 he went with the manager Ian Porterfield to become assistant manager of Sheffield United. However, when Porterfield moved to Aberdeen in 1986 McSeveney declined the offer to go with him for a second time.

For nearly 30 years after his managerial career ended, McSeveney was a scout for numerous clubs including Rotherham, Coventry and Manchester United. In his later years he regularly attended supporters' functions dedicated to his former clubs.

== Death ==
He died in December 2020 at the age of 89, and is buried at the cemetery in Cawthorne.
