= Bobby Foster =

English footballer

Personal information
- Full name: Robert Foster
- Date of birth: 19 July 1929
- Place of birth: Sheffield, England
- Date of death: 28 February 2006 (aged 76)
- Place of death: Chesterfield, Derbyshire, England
- Position: Forward

Senior career*
Years	Team	Apps	(Gls)
1948–1951	Chesterfield	4	(0)
1951–1957	Preston North End	101	(41)
1958–1959	Rotherham United	1	(0)
- Wigan Athletic
Total		106	(41)
- * Club domestic league appearances and goals

Robert Foster (19 July 1929 – 28 February 2006) was an English footballer who played in the Football League for Chesterfield, Preston North End and Rotherham United.

== Honours ==
Preston North End

- FA Cup runner-up: 1953–54
