= George McGuckin =

Scottish footballer

Personal information
- Full name: George Kay Whyte McGuckin
- Date of birth: 11 August 1938 (age 88)
- Place of birth: Dundee, Scotland
- Position: Wing half

Youth career
- Dundee Shamrock

Senior career*
Years	Team	Apps	(Gls)
1955–1958	Cardiff City	4	(0)
- * Club domestic league appearances and goals

George Kay Whyte McGuckin (born 11 August 1938) is a Scottish former professional footballer who played as a wing half. He made four appearances in the Football League for Cardiff City.
