= George Robb (footballer) =

English footballer

George Robb (1 June 1926 – 25 December 2011) was a footballer who played outside left for Tottenham Hotspur and England. Robb represented Great Britain at the 1952 Olympic Games. He also had a career as a schoolteacher. He died on Christmas Day 2011 following a long-term illness.

== Career ==
George Robb joined Finchley F.C. straight from Holloway Grammar School at the age of sixteen and played for the team first in 1943 and whilst still in the Royal Navy. In the late 1940s, he was a teacher at St. Mary's C. of E. Primary School in Crouch End, Hornsey. Whilst still an amateur he started playing for Spurs in 1951 but continued to hold his place in the Finchley side.

During his time as an amateur he earned seventeen England amateur caps and also played for Great Britain at the 1952 Summer Olympics held in Helsinki, Finland. He scored a goal in the one game the team played when they lost to Luxembourg 3–5.

Robb retained his amateur status until 1953 when despite earlier interest from Italian club Padua he was persuaded to sign as a professional for Tottenham Hotspur. During his time at Tottenham between 1951 and 1958 he played 200 games and scored 58 goals. Robb scored on his debut on Christmas Day 1951 in a 3–0 win over Charlton Athletic at The Valley.

He made one appearance as a professional at international level for England. This was on 25 November 1953 against Hungary. This was the landmark game in which England lost 3 – 6. Originally Tom Finney was selected at left wing, but due to injury before the game, Robb played in his place.

Robb was forced by injury to retire from playing professionally following an injury sustained in a 5-a-side competition in 1958. His main profession was as a teacher even whilst playing football, teaching at Christ's College, Finchley, at the time a State Grammar School, from 1952 until 1964 and then full-time at Ardingly College near Haywards Heath, West Sussex until he retired in 1986.

== Personal life ==
George Robb was born in Finsbury Park, London on 1 June 1926, the son of motor engineer Thomas Philip Robb and his wife Ellen Emma Attwood. He married his wife Kathleen Wilson in Hampstead in 1960. He lived in Ardingly, near Haywards Heath for 47 years. George suffered from vascular dementia during the latter years of his life and died on 25 December 2011.
