= Gerry Hitchens =

English footballer

- Hitchens in 1960

Personal information
- Full name: Gerald Archibald Hitchens
- Date of birth: 8 October 1934
- Place of birth: Rawnsley, Staffordshire, England
- Date of death: 13 April 1983 (aged 48)
- Place of death: Hope, Clwyd, Wales
- Position: Centre forward

Senior career*
Years	Team	Apps	(Gls)
1952–1953	Highley Miners Welfare		
1953–1955	Kidderminster Harriers	14	(6)
1955–1957	Cardiff City	95	(40)
1957–1961	Aston Villa	132	(78)
1961–1962	Inter Milan	39	(17)
1962–1965	Torino	89	(28)
1965–1967	Atalanta	58	(10)
1967	→ Chicago Mustangs (loan)		(1)
1967–1969	Cagliari	19	(4)
1969–1971	Worcester City	51	(25)
1971	Merthyr Tydfil	6	(0)

International career
1961–1962	England	7	(5)
- * Club domestic league appearances and goals

Gerald Archibald Hitchens (8 October 1934 – 13 April 1983) was an English footballer who played as a centre forward.

Gerry Hitchens died on 20 April 1983. He was playing in 1983 during a charity football match for a Mold-based firm of solicitors at Castell Alun sports ground in Hope. Seconds after heading a cross over the bar, Hitchens collapsed and was taken to Wrexham General Hospital but pronounced dead on arrival. His ashes were interred in Holywell. He was 48.

== Early career ==
Hitchens was born in the village of Rawnsley, Staffordshire, near Cannock, and began his career as a coal miner. He played in Shropshire with Highley Youth Club and Highley Miners Welfare between 1952 and 1953. He appeared in a county cup final for the Miners at Aggborough, the home stadium of local club Kidderminster Harriers. His performance was being watched by the Harriers club secretary Ted Gamson, who went on to offer Hitchens a contract in September 1953. After initially playing in the reserves, Hitchens played fourteen games for the first team, scoring six goals.

== Professional career ==
Despite interest from West Bromwich Albion and Aston Villa, Hitchens moved to Cardiff City in January 1955 for a fee of £1,500. Hitchens got off to a good start by scoring within three minutes of the kick-off when making his League debut against Wolverhampton Wanderers in April 1955. Hitchens was then playing inside-forward but he subsequently took over the centre-forward berth and was top scorer in the subsequent two seasons.

Hitchens moved on to Aston Villa in 1957 for £22,500, where he spent four seasons, scoring 96 goals in 160 appearances. The 26-year-old played his final game on 29 Apr 1961 in a 4-1 First Division home victory over Sheffield Wednesday, playing with Charlie Aitken in his first Villa game.

He made his debut for England in 1961, scoring after just 90 seconds in an 8–0 drubbing of Mexico, and two weeks later scored twice more in Rome as England beat Italy 3–2.

This brought him to the attention of Inter Milan, who signed him in the summer of 1961 for £85,000. Hitchens was Internazionale's top scorer with 16 goals in his first season.

He played for England in the 1962 World Cup in Chile, and won a total of seven caps, scoring five goals. When chosen to appear for England in the World Cup, Hitchens became the first Englishman to represent his country while on the books of a foreign club. Inter won Serie A in 1963, making him the second Englishman to win the Italian title after Jimmy Greaves and the last until Ashley Young did so for the same club in 2021.

However, when Alf Ramsey took over as England manager, Hitchens' international spell came to a halt, Ramsey preferring to pick home-based players.

Nevertheless, Hitchens stayed in Italy for nine years, also playing for Torino, Atalanta and Cagliari.

After retiring from the professional game in 1971, he played for Worcester City and Merthyr Tydfil before moving to live in Wales, managing an ironworks in Pontypridd before moving north to Holywell, Flintshire, in 1977 to run his brother-in-law's timber supply firm near Prestatyn.

== Career statistics ==
Appearances and goals by club, season and competition
Club	Season	League			National Cup		League Cup		Total	
Club	Season	Division	Apps	Goals	Apps	Goals	Apps	Goals	Apps	Goals
Cardiff City	1954–55	First Division	2	1			–			
Cardiff City	1955–56	First Division	36	15			–			
Cardiff City	1956–57	First Division	41	21			–			
Cardiff City	1957–58	Second Division	16	3			–			
Cardiff City	Total		95	40			0	0		
Aston Villa	1957–58	First Division	20	10	2	1	–		22	11
Aston Villa	1958–59	First Division	35	16	6	2	–		41	18
Aston Villa	1959–60	Second Division	36	23	5	2	–		41	25
Aston Villa	1960–61	First Division	41	29	5	2	10	11	56	42
Aston Villa	Total		132	78	18	7	10	11	160	96
Inter Milan	1961–62	Serie A	34	16	0	0	3	2	37	18
Inter Milan	1962–63	Serie A	5	1	1	1	–		6	2
Inter Milan	Total		39	17	1	1	3	2	43	20
Torino	1962–63	Serie A	24	11						
Torino	1963–64	Serie A	33	9						
Torino	1964–65	Serie A	32	8						
Torino	Total		89	28						
Atalanta	1965–66	Serie A	33	6						
Atalanta	1966–67	Serie A	25	4						
Atalanta	Total		58	10						
Cagliari	1967–68	Serie A	17	4						
Cagliari	1968–69	Serie A	2	0						
Cagliari	Total		19	4						
Career total			432	177						

== Honours ==
Cardiff City

- Welsh Cup: 1955–56

Aston Villa

- Second Division: 1959–60

Inter Milan

- Serie A: 1962–63

Torino

- Coppa Italia runner-up: 1962–63, 1963–64
