= Brian Walsh (English footballer) =

English footballer

Personal information
- Full name: John Brian Walsh
- Date of birth: 26 March 1932
- Place of birth: Aldershot, England
- Date of death: 18 December 2000 (aged 68)
- Place of death: Epsom, Surrey, England
- Position: Winger

Senior career*
Years	Team	Apps	(Gls)
1953–1955	Arsenal	17	(0)
1955–1961	Cardiff City	206	(32)
1961–1962	Newport County	27	(3)
- * Club domestic league appearances and goals

John Brian Walsh (26 March 1932 – January 2001) was an English professional footballer.

== Career ==
Walsh began his career playing non-league football before joining Arsenal as an amateur in March 1949 before signing professional for the club five months later. He played a handful of friendlies for Arsenal before being called up for national service in 1950. He returned to Highbury in 1952 and played regularly for the reserve side before making his debut on 26 September 1953 against Cardiff City. He went on to make just seventeen league appearances for the club before leaving as part of a deal which saw Cardiff City players Mike Tiddy and Gordon Nutt move to London and Walsh move the other way to Ninian Park.

He made his Cardiff debut in a 2–1 win over Preston North End and his performances on the wing saw him become popular with the Cardiff fans. He helped the club to two Welsh Cup's, including scoring twice against Cardiff's archrivals Swansea City in a South Wales derby final which ended 3–2 to the Bluebirds. In November 1961 he left Cardiff for £2,000 to sign for Newport County and spent two years at Somerton Park before retiring. He later went on to become an accountant, a profession he qualified for while playing in Cardiff.

Following his retirement from football he returned to live in South East England. Walsh died in Epsom on 18 December 2000.

== Honors ==
Cardiff City

- Welsh Cup Winner: 2

1955–56, 1958–59
