= John Frowen =

Welsh footballer

Personal information
- Full name: John Frowen
- Date of birth: 11 October 1931
- Place of birth: Trelewis, Wales
- Date of death: 28 August 2011 (aged 79)
- Place of death: Newport, Wales
- Position: Defender

Senior career*
Years	Team	Apps	(Gls)
1952–1958	Cardiff City	35	(0)
1958–1963	Bristol Rovers	84	(0)
1963–1966	Newport County	68	(0)
- * Club domestic league appearances and goals

John Frowen (11 October 1931 – 28 August 2011) was a professional footballer who played for Cardiff City, Bristol Rovers and Newport County.

Born in Trelewis, Wales, Frowen began his professional career at Cardiff City after being spotted playing for local side Nelson. Graduating through the club's junior teams, he made his debut in a 1–0 defeat to West Bromwich Albion in September 1952. However, he struggled to hold on to a regular first team place due to the form of players such as Stan Montgomery and Danny Malloy. He left Cardiff in the summer of 1958, joining Bristol Rovers where he managed to become a first team choice for the club.
