= Ron Stockin =

English footballer (1931–2024)

Personal information
- Date of birth: 27 June 1931
- Place of birth: Birmingham, England
- Date of death: July 2024 (aged 93)
- Position: Inside forward

Senior career*
Years	Team	Apps	(Gls)
1951–1952	West Bromwich Albion	0	(0)
1952	Walsall	6	(3)
1952–1954	Wolverhampton Wanderers	21	(7)
1954–1957	Cardiff City	57	(16)
1957–1960	Grimsby Town	49	(14)
1960	Nuneaton Borough		
- * Club domestic league appearances and goals

Ronald Stockin (27 June 1931 – 19 July 2024) was an English professional footballer who played as an inside forward. Stockin died in July 2024, at the age of 93.
