= Alf Bond =

English football referee (died 1986)

Alfred "Alf" Bond (died 1 July 1986) was an English football referee who was the referee in the 1956 FA Cup Final.

Bond was born in Silvertown, Essex. He was a former right-half for Danes Athletic in the South-West District League – of which he was vice-president. Bond lost his right arm at the age of 19 when working in a rubber factory. He learned to write and perform other tasks with his left hand. He tried to resume playing but found that his "balance had gone" so he decided to take up refereeing instead. Promotion came via the Corinthian League, the Football Combination and the Southern League.

He was the proprietor of a newsagents business in Fulham. His comment on being selected to officiate at the Cup Final: "It's a grand feeling to know that you have gained this honour."

Bond controlled his first league game in 1948 - a Third Division (South) match. He officiated at the 1954 FA Amateur Cup Final at Wembley between Bishop Auckland and Crook Town and has also refereed four international matches.

He died on 1 July 1986 in Wandsworth aged 75.
