= Colin Baker (Welsh footballer) =

Welsh footballer (1934–2021)

Personal information
- Full name: Colin Walter Baker
- Date of birth: 18 December 1934
- Place of birth: Cardiff, Wales
- Date of death: 11 April 2021 (aged 86)
- Height: 5 ft 9 in (1.75 m)
- Position: Wing half

Senior career*
Years	Team	Apps	(Gls)
1953–1966	Cardiff City	298	(18)

International career
1958	Wales U23	1	(0)
1958–1961	Wales	7	(0)
- * Club domestic league appearances and goals

Colin Walter Baker (18 December 1934 – 11 April 2021) was a Welsh professional footballer. A wing half, he spent his entire professional career playing for his home town club Cardiff City, making over 300 appearances during a 13-year spell with the Bluebirds. He also won 7 caps for the Wales national team during his career and was part of the squad for the 1958 FIFA World Cup.

== Club career ==
Born in Tremorfa, Cardiff, Baker had to play rugby at school, but preferred football, and soon joined Cardiff Nomads. Baker joined Cardiff City from Cardiff Nomads as an amateur in 1951. He became a part-time professional between 1952 and 1953 whilst completing his National Service in the Royal Air Force. He became a full-time professional in 1953. During summer months, Baker would stay fit by playing Baseball for Adamsdown.

He made his debut in a 2–2 draw with Sheffield Wednesday on the final day of the 1953–54 season and went on to take over from his namesake Billy Baker on a permanent basis and his partnership with Alan Harrington during the 1959–60 season helped the Bluebirds win promotion back to the First Division. Very rarely suffering from injuries, in 1965 he became the first Cardiff player ever to be substituted, which had recently been introduced, when he was taken off due to injury during a match against Bury for David Summerhayes. He was a first team player for the Bluebirds for more than a decade and is regarded as one of the greatest players in the club's history.

== International career ==
Baker gained one cap for the Wales under-23 side during a match against England. Despite being uncapped at senior level, Baker was selected as part of the Wales squad for the 1958 FIFA World Cup in Sweden. He made his debut for Wales during the tournament in Wales' second group game, a 1–1 draw with Mexico in the group stages after being brought in for Cardiff teammate Derrick Sullivan. Sullivan had suffered a knee injury during Wales' opening group match against Hungary and failed a late fitness test for the following match. Baker came close to scoring in the first half of the match, hitting the crossbar with one shot after chipping Mexican goalkeeper Antonio Carbajal but was forced off the pitch in the final minutes of the game with injury during which Mexico scored a late equaliser. He did not feature again during the tournament but went on to win a total of 7 caps, making his final appearance on 8 November 1961 against Scotland.

== Career statistics ==
Appearances and goals by club, season and competition
Club	Season	League			FA Cup		League Cup (Note: The Football League Cup was introduced in the 1960–61 season.)		Other (Note: Includes other competitive competitions, including the Welsh Cup and the UEFA Cup Winners' Cup.)		Total	
Club	Season	Division	Apps	Goals	Apps	Goals	Apps	Goals	Apps	Goals	Apps	Goals
Cardiff City	1953–54	First Division	1	0	0	0	–		0	0	1	0
Cardiff City	1954–55	First Division	2	0	0	0	–		0	0	2	0
Cardiff City	1955–56	First Division	24	1	2	0	–		5	1	31	2
Cardiff City	1956–57	First Division	27	3	2	0	–		3	0	32	3
Cardiff City	1957–58	Second Division	23	1	4	0	–		0	0	27	1
Cardiff City	1958–59	Second Division	39	1	2	0	–		5	0	46	1
Cardiff City	1959–60	Second Division	36	6	0	0	–		5	1	41	7
Cardiff City	1960–61	First Division	39	4	3	0	2	0	4	0	48	4
Cardiff City	1961–62	First Division	42	1	1	0	4	0	4	0	51	1
Cardiff City	1962–63	Second Division	39	0	1	0	2	0	1	0	43	0
Cardiff City	1963–64	Second Division	12	1	1	0	2	0	2	0	17	1
Cardiff City	1964–65	Second Division	6	0	0	0	0	0	3	0	9	0
Cardiff City	1965–66	Second Division	8	0	1	0	2	0	2	0	13	0
Total			298	18	17	0	12	0	34	2	361	20

== Honours ==
Cardiff City

- Welsh Cup: 1955–56, 1958–59, 1963–64, 1964–65; runners-up 1959–60
- Football League Second Division runners-up: 1959–60
