= Neil O'Halloran =

Welsh footballer

Personal information
- Full name: Neil O'Halloran
- Date of birth: 21 June 1933
- Place of birth: Cardiff, Wales
- Date of death: October 1995 (aged 62)
- Place of death: Barry, Wales
- Position: Inside forward

Senior career*
Years	Team	Apps	(Gls)
- Cardiff Corinthians
1954–1957	Cardiff City	10	(4)
1957–1958	Newport County	14	(2)
- Barry Town
Total		24	(6)
- * Club domestic league appearances and goals

Neil O'Halloran (21 June 1933 – October 1995) was a Welsh professional footballer who played as an inside forward.

== Career ==
Born in Cardiff, O'Halloran played for Cardiff Corinthians, Cardiff City, Newport County and Barry Town.
