= Trevor Morris (footballer) =

Welsh footballer and manager

Trevor Morris OBE DFM
Personal information
- Full name: Trevor Morris
- Date of birth: 6 September 1920
- Place of birth: Gorslas, Wales
- Date of death: 3 February 2003 (aged 82)
- Place of death: Nottingham, England
- Position: Wing half

Senior career*
Years	Team	Apps	(Gls)
1938–1939	Ipswich Town	1	(0)

Managerial career
- 1954–1958: Cardiff City
- 1958–1965: Swansea Town
- 1964: Wales (caretaker)
- * Club domestic league appearances and goals

Trevor Morris OBE DFM (6 September 1920 – 3 February 2003) was a Welsh professional footballer and manager.

== Playing career ==
The son of a miner from Carmarthenshire, Morris began his career with Ipswich Town. He made his debut on 6 May 1939 in a 0–0 draw with Bournemouth & Boscombe Athletic on the final day of the 1938–39 season. With the outbreak of the Second World War, Morris' playing career came to an end when he suffered a broken leg while playing for Cardiff City as a guest in a wartime cup match against Bristol City.

== Second World War ==
During the Second World War, Morris served in RAF Bomber Command and piloted the lead aircraft in a squadron of 40 Avro Lancaster's on D-Day. He flew more than 40 missions over enemy territory and was awarded the Distinguished Flying Medal in May 1945.

== Managerial career ==
He returned to football in 1946 as Cardiff City's assistant secretary, and was promoted to manager-secretary in 1954 after the resignation of Cyril Spiers. Morris was unable to stop the club's relegation from the First Division and, after struggling the following year in Division Two, he resigned and instead took over at their South Wales rivals Swansea Town.

He was sacked following Swansea's relegation to the Third Division in 1965. He later had a short spell as general manager of Newport County.

== Later life ==
In 1971, he was appointed secretary of the Football Association of Wales, where he remained until 1982 when he stepped down due to a heart condition. In the 1976 New Year Honours, Morris was appointed an Officer of the Order of the British Empire (OBE) for his services to Welsh football.

One of Morris's long-term achievements was the acceptance of the principle that footballers could play for a country with which they had blood ties but which was not the country of their birth. He died on 3 February 2003.

== Managerial statistics ==
Team	Country	From	To	Record				
Team	Country	From	To	G	W	D	L	Win %
Cardiff City	(Wales)	April 1954	August 1958	186	59	40	87	31.72
Swansea Town	(Wales)	August 1958	May 1965	327	112	77	138	34.25
Total				513	171	117	225	33.33
