= 1950–51 Cardiff City F.C. season =

Welsh football club season

Cardiff City
1950–51 season
- Chairman: (Wales) Sir Herbert Merrett
- Manager: (England) Cyril Spiers
- Division Two: 3rd
- FA Cup: 3rd round
- Welsh Cup: Runners-up
- Top goalscorer: League: Wilf Grant (14); All: Wilf Grant (18)
- Highest home attendance: 41,074 v Swansea Town 24 March 1951
- Lowest home attendance: 15,364 v Grimsby Town 16 December 1950
- Average home league attendance: 28,888
Home colours

The 1950–51 season was Cardiff City F.C.'s 24th season in the Football League. They competed in the 22-team Division Two, then the second tier of English football, finishing third.

== Season review ==
=== Football League Second Division ===
==== Partial league table ====
Pos	Team	Pld	W	D	L	GF	GA	GAv	Pts	Qualification or relegation
1	Preston North End (C, P)	42	26	5	11	91	49	1.857	57	Promotion to the First Division
2	Manchester City (P)	42	19	14	9	89	61	1.459	52	Promotion to the First Division
3	Cardiff City	42	17	16	9	53	45	1.178	50	
4	Birmingham City	42	20	9	13	64	53	1.208	49	
5	Leeds United	42	20	8	14	63	55	1.145	48	

Rules for classification: 1) Points; 2) Goal average; 3) Goals scored
(C) Champions; (P) Promoted

==== Results by round ====
Round	1	2	3	4	5	6	7	8	9	10	11	12	13	14	15	16	17	18	19	20	21	22	23	24	25	26	27	28	29	30	31	32	33	34	35	36	37	38	39	40	41	42
Ground	A	A	H	H	A	H	H	A	H	A	A	H	A	H	A	H	A	H	A	H	H	A	H	A	H	A	H	A	H	H	A	H	A	A	H	H	A	H	A	H	A	A
Result	D	L	W	D	D	W	D	L	W	D	L	D	D	D	L	W	D	W	D	W	W	W	W	L	L	W	W	W	D	W	D	D	L	D	W	W	L	D	W	W	L	D
Position	9	15	9	7	10	6	7	10	9	10	11	10	11	11	13	12	12	10	12	9	8	8	5	6	6	5	5	3	4	4	3	3	3	3	2	2	2	4	3	3	4	3
Points	1	1	3	4	5	7	8	8	10	11	11	12	13	14	14	16	17	19	20	22	24	26	28	28	28	30	32	34	35	37	38	39	39	40	42	44	44	45	47	49	49	50

A = Away; H = Home; W = Win; D = Draw; L = Loss

=== Welsh Cup ===
In the Welsh Cup, Cardiff started their campaign by scoring fifteen goals in two games with an 8–0 win over Barry Town followed by a 7–1 victory over Bangor City. After beating Wrexham 1–0, Cardiff suffered a 3–2 defeat to Merthyr Tydfil in a final replay.

== Players ==
Note: Flags indicate national team as defined under FIFA eligibility rules; some limited exceptions apply. Players may hold more than one non-FIFA nationality.

No.	Pos.	Nation	Player
--	GK	WAL	Ron Howells
--	GK	ENG	Phil Joslin
--	GK	WAL	Ted Morris
--	DF	WAL	Colin Gale
--	DF	WAL	Ken Hollyman
--	DF	WAL	Arthur Lever
--	DF	ENG	Stan Montgomery
--	DF	ENG	Charles Rutter
--	DF	WAL	Alf Sherwood
--	DF	ENG	Gerry Smyth
--	DF	WAL	Albert Stitfall
--	DF	WAL	Ron Stitfall
--	DF	WAL	Derrick Sullivan
--	DF	WAL	Rees Thomas
--	DF	WAL	Glyn Williams
--	MF	WAL	Billy Baker
--	MF	NIR	Bobby McLaughlin

No.	Pos.	Nation	Player
--	MF	WAL	Griff Norman
--	MF	ENG	Cliff Nugent
--	MF	WAL	Ken Roberts
--	MF	ENG	Mike Tiddy
--	MF	WAL	Evan Williams
--	MF	WAL	Roley Williams
--	FW	ENG	Doug Blair
--	FW	WAL	George Edwards
--	FW	WAL	Elfed Evans
--	FW	ENG	Leslie Evans
--	FW	ENG	Wilf Grant
--	FW	SCO	Bob Lamie
--	FW	EIR	Paddy McIlvenny
--	FW	WAL	Marwood Marchant
--	FW	ENG	Don Mills
--	FW	WAL	Ken Oakley
--	FW	WAL	Colin Webster

== Fixtures and results ==
=== Second Division ===
19 August 1950 1	Grimsby Town	0–0	Cardiff City	Grimsby
15:15				Stadium: Blundell Park; Attendance: 20,083; Referee: G Clark (London)

23 August 1950 2	Manchester City	2–1	Cardiff City	Manchester
	George Smith; Dennis Westcott		Roley Williams	Stadium: Maine Road; Attendance: 18,242; Referee: George Pankhurst (Warwick)

26 August 1950 3	Cardiff City	2–0	Notts County	Cardiff
15:15	Ken Oakley; George Edwards			Stadium: Ninian Park; Attendance: 36,646; Referee: RC Carter (Swindon)

28 August 1950 4	Cardiff City	1–1	Manchester City	Cardiff
18:15	Elfed Evans		Jackie Oakes	Stadium: Ninian Park; Attendance: 32,817; Referee: George Pankhurst (Warwick)

2 September 1950 5	Preston North End	1–1	Cardiff City	Preston
	Eddie Quigley		George Edwards	Stadium: Deepdale; Attendance: 25,900

4 September 1950 6	Cardiff City	2–1	West Ham United	Cardiff
18:15	Elfed Evans; Doug Blair		Stan Johns	Stadium: Ninian Park; Attendance: 32,292

9 September 1950 7	Cardiff City	2–2	Bury	Cardiff
15:15	Bob Lamie; Elfed Evans		Ken Plant; John Walton	Stadium: Ninian Park; Attendance: 29,797; Referee: G Roden

16 September 1950 8	Queens Park Rangers	3–2	Cardiff City	London
15:15	George Wardle; Cyril Hatton (pen.); Bill Heath		Elfed Evans (o.g.) David Nelson	Stadium: Loftus Road; Attendance: 19,236; Referee: AW Smith (Aldershot)

23 September 1950 9	Cardiff City	1–0	Chesterfield	Cardiff
15:15	Freddie Capel (o.g.)			Stadium: Ninian Park; Attendance: 27,754; Referee: Alfred Tolley (Worcester)

30 September 1950 10	Leicester City	1–1	Cardiff City	Leicester
	Derek Hines		Doug Blair	Stadium: Filbert Street; Attendance: 22,696

7 October 1950 11	Blackburn Rovers	2–0	Cardiff City	Blackburn
	Jackie Campbell (?)			Stadium: Ewood Park; Attendance: 24,831; Referee: JG Williams

14 October 1950 12	Cardiff City	2–2	Southampton	Cardiff
15:15	Doug Blair 1'; Joe Mallett 33' (o.g.)		66', 82' Ernie Stevenson	Stadium: Ninian Park; Attendance: 26,409

21 October 1950 13	Doncaster Rovers	0–0	Cardiff City	Doncaster
				Stadium: Belle Vue; Attendance: 26,356

28 October 1950 14	Cardiff City	1–1	Brentford	Cardiff
15:00	Doug Blair		Jimmy Hill	Stadium: Ninian Park; Attendance: 22,885; Referee: RS Lloyd (Oswestry)

4 November 1950 15	Swansea Town	1–0	Cardiff City	Swansea
15:00	Billy Lucas			Stadium: Vetch Field; Attendance: 26,393

11 November 1950 16	Cardiff City	2–1	Hull City	Cardiff
14:45	Roley Williams; Doug Blair		Alf Ackerman	Stadium: Ninian Park; Attendance: 25,007; Referee: Les Mackay (Fulham)

18 November 1950 17	Barnsley	0–0	Cardiff City	Barnsley
				Stadium: Oakwell; Attendance: 28,818

25 November 1950 18	Cardiff City	2–0	Sheffield United	Cardiff
14:30	George Edwards; Roley Williams			Stadium: Ninian Park; Attendance: 25,622

2 December 1950 19	Luton Town	1–1	Cardiff City	Luton
14:30	Willie Havenga 6'	Luton details	72' Wilf Grant	Stadium: Kenilworth Road; Attendance: 13,062; Referee: Norman C Taylor (Westbury)

9 December 1950 20	Cardiff City	1–0	Leeds United	Cardiff
14:30	George Edwards 15'			Stadium: Ninian Park; Attendance: 23,716; Referee: JG Williams

16 December 1950 21	Cardiff City	5–2	Grimsby Town	Cardiff
14:30	Wilf Grant; Wilf Grant; Wilf Grant; Roley Williams; Roley Williams		(?) Tommy Briggs	Stadium: Ninian Park; Attendance: 15,364; Referee: G Clark

23 December 1950 22	Notts County	1–2	Cardiff City	Nottingham
	Tommy Johnston		Wilf Grant; Roley Williams	Stadium: Meadow Lane; Attendance: 27,634; Referee: RC Carter

25 December 1950 23	Cardiff City	2–1	Coventry City	Cardiff
11:00	George Edwards; George Edwards		Harry Barratt	Stadium: Ninian Park; Attendance: 32,778

26 December 1950 24	Coventry City	2–1	Cardiff City	Coventry
	Ken Chisholm 7', 27'		36' Wilf Grant	Stadium: Highfield Road; Attendance: 33,194; Referee: WHE Evans

30 December 1950 25	Cardiff City	0–2	Preston North End	Cardiff
14:30			Angus Morrison; Charlie Wayman	Stadium: Ninian Park; Attendance: 26,717; Referee: J Platt

13 January 1951 26	Bury	1–2	Cardiff City	Bury
14:15	George Hazlett		George Edwards (o.g.) George Griffiths	Stadium: Gigg Lane; Attendance: 10,726; Referee: G Roden

20 January 1951 27	Cardiff City	4–2	Queens Park Rangers	Cardiff
14:45	Wilf Grant; Wilf Grant; Bobby McLaughlin; Mike Tiddy		Ernie Shepherd; Ernie Shepherd	Stadium: Ninian Park; Attendance: 21,017; Referee: AW Smith (Aldershot)

3 February 1951 28	Chesterfield	0–3	Cardiff City	Chesterfield
			Wilf Grant; Wilf Grant; Marwood Marchant	Stadium: Saltergate; Attendance: 12,998

17 February 1951 29	Cardiff City	2–2	Leicester City	Cardiff
15:15	Marwood Marchant; Billy Baker		Derek Hines (pen.) Arthur Rowley	Stadium: Ninian Park; Attendance: 23,583; Referee: H Tootal (Wigan)

24 February 1951 30	Cardiff City	1–0	Blackburn Rovers	Cardiff
15:15	Wilf Grant			Stadium: Ninian Park; Attendance: 32,811; Referee: Joe Williams (Woodthorpe)

3 March 1951 31	Southampton	1–1	Cardiff City	Southampton
15:00	Jack Edwards 29' (pen.)		56' George Edwards	Stadium: The Dell; Attendance: 24,233

10 March 1951 32	Cardiff City	0–0	Doncaster Rovers	Cardiff
15:15				Stadium: Ninian Park; Attendance: 37,724; Referee: William Rogers (Birmingham)

17 March 1951 33	Brentford	4–0	Cardiff City	London
	Johnny Paton 22'; Fred Monk 30'; Billy Sperrin 65'; Jimmy Hill 84'			Stadium: Griffin Park; Attendance: 19,663; Referee: RS Lloyd (Oswestry)

23 March 1951 34	Birmingham City	0–0	Cardiff City	Birmingham
				Stadium: St Andrew's; Attendance: 15,054

24 March 1951 35	Cardiff City	1–0	Swansea Town	Cardiff
15:15	Marwood Marchant 16'			Stadium: Ninian Park; Attendance: 41,074; Referee: AW Smith (Aldershot)

26 March 1951 36	Cardiff City	2–1	Birmingham City	Cardiff
15:15	Bobby McLaughlin; Wilf Grant		Ken Rowley	Stadium: Ninian Park; Attendance: 36,992; Referee: Ernest Baker (Surrey)

31 March 1951 37	Hull City	2–0	Cardiff City	Hull
15:15	Alf Ackerman; Syd Gerrie			Stadium: Boothferry Park; Attendance: 20,239; Referee: Les (LAM) Mackay (London)

7 April 1951 38	Cardiff City	1–1	Barnsley	Cardiff
15:15	Wilf Grant		Gavin Smith	Stadium: Ninian Park; Attendance: 27,631

14 April 1951 39	Sheffield United	1–2	Cardiff City	Sheffield
15:00	Joe Shaw		Mike Tiddy; George Edwards	Stadium: Bramall Lane; Attendance: 20,747; Referee: ER Hill (Chester)

21 April 1951 40	Cardiff City	2–1	Luton Town	Cardiff
15:15	Wilf Grant; Syd Owen 80' (o.g.)	Luton report	George Stobbart	Stadium: Ninian Park; Attendance: 28,022; Referee: Norman Taylor (Westbury)

28 April 1951 41	Leeds United	2–0	Cardiff City	Leeds
	Ray Iggleden 50'; Ken Hollyman 52' (o.g.)			Stadium: Elland Road; Attendance: 14,765; Referee: JG Williams

5 May 1951 42	West Ham United	0–0	Cardiff City	London
15:00				Stadium: Upton Park; Attendance: 17,942

=== FA Cup ===
6 January 1951 Round 3	West Ham United	2–1	Cardiff City	London
14:15	Jim Barrett Jr. Gerry Gazzard		Wilf Grant	Stadium: Upton Park; Attendance: 30,000; Referee: AC (Bert) Williams (Brighton)

=== Welsh Cup ===
31 January 1951 Round 5	Cardiff City	8–0	Barry	Cardiff
	Kelly (o.g.); Marwood Marchant; Marwood Marchant; Leslie Evans; Leslie Evans; Leslie Evans; Leslie Evans; Wilf Grant			Stadium: Ninian Park; Attendance: 1,500

7 March 1951 Round 6	Bangor	1–7	Cardiff City	Bangor
16:15	Goal		George Edwards; George Edwards; George Edwards; Mike Tiddy; Mike Tiddy; Wilf Grant; Marwood Marchant	Stadium: Farrar Road; Attendance: 12,000

16 April 1951 Semi Final	Wrexham	0–1	Cardiff City	Shrewsbury
18:15		Wrexham details	6' George Edwards	Stadium: Gay Meadow; Attendance: 5,000; Referee: BM Griffiths (Newport)

7 May 1951 Final	Merthyr Tydfil	1–1	Cardiff City	Swansea
18:30	Jenkin Powell		Wilf Grant	Stadium: Vetch Field; Attendance: 18,000; Referee: BM Griffiths (Newport)

17 May 1951 Final (Replay)	Merthyr Tydfil	3–2	Cardiff City	Swansea
18:30	Jenkin Powell; Dai Lloyd; Bill Jarman		George Edwards; Mike Tiddy	Stadium: Vetch Field; Attendance: 18,000; Referee: BM Griffiths (Newport)

== See also ==
- List of Cardiff City F.C. seasons
