= 1952–53 Cardiff City F.C. season =

Welsh football club season

Cardiff City
1952–53 season
- Chairman: (Wales) Sir Herbert Merrett (Wales) John Morgan
- Manager: (England) Cyril Spiers
- Division One: 12th
- FA Cup: 3rd round
- Welsh Cup: Semi-finals
- Top goalscorer: League: Ken Chisholm (13); All: Ken Chisholm (15)
- Highest home attendance: 57,893 v Arsenal, 22 April 1953
- Lowest home attendance: 19,830 v Chelsea, 28 March 1953
- Average home league attendance: 37,932
Home colours

The 1952–53 season was Cardiff City F.C.'s 26th season in the Football League. They competed in the 22-team Division One, then the first tier of English football, finishing twelfth.

== Season review ==
=== Football League First Division ===
==== Partial league table ====
Pos	Team	Pld	W	D	L	GF	GA	GAv	Pts
10	Tottenham Hotspur	42	15	11	16	78	69	1.130	41
11	Aston Villa	42	14	13	15	63	61	1.033	41
12	Cardiff City	42	14	12	16	54	46	1.174	40
13	Middlesbrough	42	14	11	17	70	77	0.909	39
14	Bolton Wanderers	42	15	9	18	61	69	0.884	39

Source: World Football
Rules for classification: 1) Points; 2) Goal average; 3) Goals scored

==== Results by round ====
Round	1	2	3	4	5	6	7	8	9	10	11	12	13	14	15	16	17	18	19	20	21	22	23	24	25	26	27	28	29	30	31	32	33	34	35	36	37	38	39	40	41	42
Ground	A	A	H	H	A	A	H	H	A	H	A	A	A	H	A	H	A	H	H	A	H	A	H	A	H	A	H	H	A	H	H	A	H	A	A	H	H	A	H	H	A	A
Result	L	L	W	D	L	L	D	L	W	W	D	L	D	D	W	L	W	W	D	L	D	L	D	D	L	D	W	L	W	W	W	W	D	L	W	W	L	W	D	L	L	L
Position	18	22	12	12	17	18	17	19	17	14	14	16	18	19	16	19	18	17	16	16	16	18	19	18	20	19	17	18	17	13	13	10	11	12	12	10	11	10	10	11	11	12
Points	0	0	2	3	3	3	4	4	6	8	9	9	10	11	13	13	15	17	18	18	19	19	20	21	21	22	24	24	26	28	30	32	33	33	35	37	37	39	40	40	40	40

A = Away; H = Home; W = Win; D = Draw; L = Loss

=== FA Cup ===
Entering in the third round, Cardiff were eliminated by Football League Third Division North side Halifax Town after a 3–1 defeat.

=== Welsh Cup ===
After a 5–2 victory over Merthyr Tydfil in the fifth round, Cardiff received a bye into the seventh round, advancing to the semi-finals with a 3–2 win over Barry Town. Their campaign came to an end following a 1–0 semi-final defeat to Rhyl.

== Players ==
Note: Flags indicate national team as defined under FIFA eligibility rules; some limited exceptions apply. Players may hold more than one non-FIFA nationality.

No.	Pos.	Nation	Player
--	GK	WAL	Ron Howells
--	GK	WAL	Graham Vearncombe
--	DF	WAL	Ron Davies
--	DF	WAL	John Frowen
--	DF	WAL	Colin Gale
--	DF	WAL	Ken Hollyman
--	DF	ENG	Jack Mansell
--	DF	ENG	Stan Montgomery
--	DF	ENG	Charles Rutter
--	DF	WAL	Alf Sherwood
--	DF	WAL	Ron Stitfall
--	DF	WAL	Derek Sullivan
--	DF	WAL	Glyn Williams
--	MF	WAL	Billy Baker
--	MF	WAL	Dennis Callan

No.	Pos.	Nation	Player
--	MF	WAL	Alan Harrington
--	MF	WAL	Islwyn Jones
--	MF	NIR	Bobby McLaughlin
--	MF	WAL	Wendell Morgan
--	MF	ENG	Cliff Nugent
--	MF	ENG	Mike Tiddy
--	MF	WAL	Roley Williams
--	FW	ENG	Doug Blair
--	FW	ENG	Ken Chisholm
--	FW	WAL	George Edwards
--	FW	ENG	Wilf Grant
--	FW	SCO	George Hazlett
--	FW	ENG	Tommy Northcott
--	FW	WAL	Ken Oakley
--	FW	ENG	Keith Thomas

== Fixtures and results ==
=== First Division ===
23 August 1952 1	Wolverhampton Wanderers	1–0	Cardiff City	Wolverhampton
	Jimmy Mullen 16'	Wolves complete record		Stadium: Molineux; Attendance: 52,309; Referee: Arthur Blythe (Edmonton)

27 August 1952 2	Middlesbrough	3–0	Cardiff City	Middlesbrough
	Harry Bell 42', 81'; Arthur Fitzsimons 46'			Stadium: Ayresome Park; Attendance: 42,159; Referee: Joe McCann (Preston)

30 August 1952 3	Cardiff City	4–0	Sheffield Wednesday	Cardiff
15:15	George Hazlett 2'; Ken Chisholm 34', 46'; Wilf Grant 47'			Stadium: Ninian Park; Attendance: 43,478; Referee: Stanley Rogers (Shrewsbury)

3 September 1952 4	Cardiff City	1–1	Middlesbrough	Cardiff
18:15	Doug Blair 70'		27' Alex McRae	Stadium: Ninian Park; Attendance: 51,512; Referee: Joe McCann (Preston)

6 September 1952 5	Tottenham Hotspur	2–1	Cardiff City	London
15:15	Sid McClellan 7'; Len Duquemin 57'		8' Ken Chisholm	Stadium: White Hart Lane; Attendance: 62,150; Referee: Bill Edwards (Somerset)

10 September 1952 6	West Bromwich Albion	1–0	Cardiff City	West Bromwich
	Ray Barlow 36'			Stadium: The Hawthorns; Attendance: 29,343; Referee: Arthur W Smith (Aldershot)

13 September 1952 7	Cardiff City	0–0	Burnley	Cardiff
15:15				Stadium: Ninian Park; Attendance: 45,182; Referee: George Pankhurst (Warwick)

17 September 1952 8	Cardiff City	1–2	West Bromwich Albion	Cardiff
17:45	Keith Thomas 28'		5' Jimmy Dudley; 44' Ronnie Allen	Stadium: Ninian Park; Attendance: 40,338; Referee: Arthur W Smith (Aldershot)

20 September 1952 9	Preston North End	2–3	Cardiff City	Preston
	Joe Dunn 13'; Ken Horton 38'		20' Doug Blair; 23' Roley Williams; 58' Ken Chisholm	Stadium: Deepdale; Attendance: 29,337; Referee: Alf Bond (Fulham)

27 September 1952 10	Cardiff City	2–0	Stoke City	Cardiff
15:15	Roley Williams; Roley Williams			Stadium: Ninian Park; Attendance: 39,223; Referee: Frank Fiander (Bucks)

4 October 1952 11	Manchester City	2–2	Cardiff City	Manchester
	Ken Branagan 41'; Don Revie 71' (pen.)		27' Ken Chisholm; 76' Mike Tiddy	Stadium: Maine Road; Attendance: 33,551; Referee: Dick Hall (Blackpool)

11 October 1952 12	Charlton Athletic	3–1	Cardiff City	London
15:15	Frank Lock 14' (pen.); Benny Fenton 54'; John Evans 75'		44' George Edwards	Stadium: The Valley; Attendance: 30,583; Referee: Roland Burgess (Reading)

25 October 1952 13	Derby County	1–1	Cardiff City	Derby
15:00	Ray Straw 74' (pen.)		42' Ken Chisholm	Stadium: Baseball Ground; Attendance: 23,208; Referee: Norman C Taylor (Westbury)

1 November 1952 14	Cardiff City	2–2	Blackpool	Cardiff
14:45	Tommy Northcott; Ken Chisholm		Albert Hobson; Ernie Taylor	Stadium: Ninian Park; Attendance: 43,662; Referee: Henry Ball (Worcester)

8 November 1952 15	Chelsea	0–2	Cardiff City	London
14:30			57' George Edwards; 80' (pen.) Alf Sherwood	Stadium: Stamford Bridge; Attendance: 52,139; Referee: Joe Williams (Woodthorpe)

15 November 1952 16	Cardiff City	1–2	Manchester United	Cardiff
14:30	Ken Chisholm 44'		37' John Aston; 42' Stan Pearson	Stadium: Ninian Park; Attendance: 40,096; Referee: Reg Leafe (Nottingham)

22 November 1952 17	Portsmouth	0–2	Cardiff City	Portsmouth
14:15			11' Tommy Northcott; 56' Wilf Grant	Stadium: Fratton Park; Attendance: 31,258; Referee: Stan Vickery (Bristol)

13 December 1952 18	Cardiff City	4–1	Sunderland	Cardiff
14:30	Wilf Grant 17', 64'; George Edwards 41'; Ken Chisholm 79'		65' Trevor Ford	Stadium: Ninian Park; Attendance: 42,518; Referee: Jack Clough (Bolton)

20 December 1952 19	Cardiff City	0–0	Wolverhampton Wanderers	Cardiff
14:30		Wolves complete history		Stadium: Ninian Park; Attendance: 25,598; Referee: Arthur Blythe (Edmonton)

25 December 1952 20	Newcastle United	3–0	Cardiff City	Newcastle
14:00	Billy Foulkes; Billy Foulkes; Bobby Mitchell (pen.)			Stadium: St James's Park; Attendance: 36,143; Referee: Frank Cowen (Manchester)

27 December 1952 21	Cardiff City	0–0	Newcastle United	Cardiff
14:30				Stadium: Ninian Park; Attendance: 52,202; Referee: Frank Cowen (Manchester)

3 January 1953 22	Sheffield Wednesday	2–0	Cardiff City	Sheffield
14:30	Derek Dooley 2', 32'			Stadium: Hillsborough; Attendance: 39,652; Referee: Stanley Rogers (Kidderminster)

17 January 1953 23	Cardiff City	0–0	Tottenham Hotspur	Cardiff
14:45				Stadium: Ninian Park; Attendance: 36,423; Referee: Bill Edwards (Somerset)

24 January 1953 24	Burnley	0–0	Cardiff City	Burnley
				Stadium: Turf Moor; Attendance: 29,491; Referee: George Pankhurst (Warwick)

7 February 1953 25	Cardiff City	0–2	Preston North End	Cardiff
15:15			24' (pen.) Tom Finney; 87' Derek Lewis	Stadium: Ninian Park; Attendance: 32,445; Referee: Alf Bond (Fulham)

14 February 1953 26	Stoke City	0–0	Cardiff City	Stoke
15:15				Stadium: Victoria Ground; Attendance: 21,626; Referee: Frank Fiander (Bucks)

21 February 1953 27	Cardiff City	6–0	Manchester City	Cardiff
15:15	Roley Williams; Keith Thomas; Keith Thomas; Wilf Grant; Wilf Grant; George Edwards			Stadium: Ninian Park; Attendance: 24,886; Referee: Dick Hall (Harrow)

28 February 1953 28	Cardiff City	0–1	Charlton Athletic	Cardiff
15:15			60' Eddie Firmani	Stadium: Ninian Park; Attendance: 35,248; Referee: Roland Burgess (Reading)

7 March 1953 29	Arsenal	0–1	Cardiff City	London
15:00			8' Doug Blair	Stadium: Highbury; Attendance: 59,780; Referee: Robert Mann (Worcester)

11 March 1953 30	Cardiff City	1–0	Bolton Wanderers	Cardiff
16:15	Ken Chisholm 86'			Stadium: Ninian Park; Attendance: 31,099; Referee: Les Overton (Derby)

14 March 1953 31	Cardiff City	2–0	Derby County	Cardiff
15:15	Tommy Northcott 18'; Roley Williams 58'			Stadium: Ninian Park; Attendance: 33,670; Referee: Norman C Taylor (Westbury)

25 March 1953 32	Blackpool	0–1	Cardiff City	Blackpool
15:00			53' Tommy Northcott	Stadium: Bloomfield Road; Attendance: 15,227; Referee: H Ball (Worcester)

28 March 1953 33	Cardiff City	3–3	Chelsea	Cardiff
15:15	Mike Tiddy 42', 75'; Doug Blair 61'		22' (o.g.) Stan Montgomery; 53' Bill Dickson; 60' Phil McKnight	Stadium: Ninian Park; Attendance: 19,830; Referee: Joe Williams (Woodthorpe)

3 April 1953 34	Liverpool	2–1	Cardiff City	Liverpool
14:30	Bill Jones 4'; Louis Bimpson 19'	LFC report	15' Tommy Northcott	Stadium: Anfield; Attendance: 52,259; Referee: W Ratcliffe (Leek, Staffs)

4 April 1953 35	Manchester United	1–4	Cardiff City	Manchester
15:00	Roger Byrne 86' (pen.)		11' Wilf Grant; 75' Wilf Grant; 15' Ken Chisholm; 60' Mike Tiddy	Stadium: Old Trafford; Attendance: 38,987; Referee: Reg Leafe (Nottingham)

6 April 1953 36	Cardiff City	4–0	Liverpool	Cardiff
15:15	Wilf Grant 11', 55'; Ken Chisholm 71', 88'	LFC Report		Stadium: Ninian Park; Attendance: 35,419; Referee: W Ratcliffe (Leek, Staffs)

11 April 1953 37	Cardiff City	0–1	Portsmouth	Cardiff
15:15			43' Jack Froggatt	Stadium: Ninian Park; Attendance: 35,945; Referee: Stan Vickery (Bristol)

18 April 1953 38	Bolton Wanderers	0–1	Cardiff City	Bolton
			23' (pen.) Alf Sherwood	Stadium: Burnden Park; Attendance: 18,037; Referee: Les Overton (Derby)

22 April 1953 39	Cardiff City	0–0	Arsenal	Cardiff
18:30				Stadium: Ninian Park; Attendance: 57,893; Referee: Robert Mann (Worcester)

25 April 1953 40	Cardiff City	1–2	Aston Villa	Cardiff
15:15	Wilf Grant 15'		30' Johnny Dixon; 47' Amos Moss	Stadium: Ninian Park; Attendance: 29,917; Referee: Bill Edwards (Somerset)

27 April 1953 41	Sunderland	4–2	Cardiff City	Sunderland
	Trevor Ford 28', 33'; Len Shackleton 40'; Harry Kirtley 56'		39' Keith Thomas; 79' Mike Tiddy	Stadium: Roker Park; Attendance: 7,469; Referee: Jack Clough (Bolton)

29 April 1953 42	Aston Villa	2–0	Cardiff City	Birmingham
18:30	Danny Blanchflower 6'; Davy Walsh 26'			Stadium: Villa Park; Attendance: 18,876; Referee: Bill Edwards (Somerset)

=== FA Cup ===
10 January 1953 Round 3	Halifax Town	3–1	Cardiff City	Halifax
	Derek Priestley 21'; Eddie Murphy 61'; Jim Moncrieff 82'		84' Billy Baker	Stadium: The Shay; Attendance: 25,000; Referee: Les Overton (Derby)

=== Welsh Cup ===
15 January 1953 Round 6	Merthyr Tydfil	2–5	Cardiff City	Merthyr Tydfil
	Goal		Tommy Northcott; Tommy Northcott; Ken Chisholm; Ken Chisholm; George Hazlett	Stadium: Penydarren Park; Attendance: 8,000

31 January 1953 Round 7	Barry	2–3	Cardiff City	Barry
15:00	Goal		Tommy Northcott; Tommy Northcott; Mike Tiddy	Stadium: Jenner Park; Attendance: 9,000

21 March 1953 Semi Final	Rhyl	1–0	Cardiff City	Rhyl
15:15	Goal			Stadium: Belle Vue; Attendance: 10,000

== See also ==
- List of Cardiff City F.C. seasons
