= 1951–52 Cardiff City F.C. season =

Welsh football club season

Cardiff City
1951–52 season
- Chairman: (Wales) Sir Herbert Merrett
- Manager: (England) Cyril Spiers
- Division Two: 2nd
- FA Cup: 3rd round
- Welsh Cup: 6th round
- Top goalscorer: League: Wilf Grant (26); All: Wilf Grant (27)
- Highest home attendance: 46,003 v Swansea Town 26 December 1951
- Lowest home attendance: 19,860 v Nottingham Forest 22 December 1951
- Average home league attendance: 28,945
Home colours

The 1951–52 season was Cardiff City F.C.'s 25th season in the Football League. They competed in the 22-team Division Two, then the second tier of English football, finishing second, winning promotion to Division One.

== Season review ==
=== Football League Second Division ===
==== Partial league table ====
Pos	Team	Pld	W	D	L	GF	GA	GAv	Pts	Qualification or relegation
1	Sheffield Wednesday (C, P)	42	21	11	10	100	66	1.515	53	Promotion to the First Division
2	Cardiff City (P)	42	20	11	11	72	54	1.333	51	Promotion to the First Division
3	Birmingham City	42	21	9	12	67	56	1.196	51	
4	Nottingham Forest	42	18	13	11	77	62	1.242	49	
5	Leicester City	42	19	9	14	78	64	1.219	47	

Rules for classification: 1) Points; 2) Goal average; 3) Goals scored
(C) Champions; (P) Promoted

==== Results by round ====
Round	1	2	3	4	5	6	7	8	9	10	11	12	13	14	15	16	17	18	19	20	21	22	23	24	25	26	27	28	29	30	31	32	33	34	35	36	37	38	39	40	41	42
Ground	H	H	A	A	H	A	A	H	H	A	H	H	A	A	H	A	H	A	H	A	A	H	A	H	A	H	A	H	A	A	H	A	H	A	A	A	H	H	A	H	H	H
Result	W	L	W	L	W	L	L	W	D	D	W	W	D	L	W	W	W	D	W	D	L	W	D	W	D	W	L	W	L	L	D	L	W	D	D	L	W	W	D	W	W	W
Position	1	7	4	9	5	16	17	11	9	9	5	3	3	9	6	5	4	4	4	4	7	5	2	1	3	1	2	1	2	4	4	5	5	5	6	7	5	5	5	3	3	2
Points	2	2	4	4	6	6	6	8	9	10	12	14	15	15	17	19	21	22	24	25	25	27	28	30	31	33	33	35	35	35	36	36	38	39	40	40	42	44	45	47	49	51

A = Away; H = Home; W = Win; D = Draw; L = Loss

=== Welsh Cup ===
After a 3–1 victory over Milford United, Cardiff were eliminated in the sixth round by Merthyr Tydfil.

== Players ==
Note: Flags indicate national team as defined under FIFA eligibility rules; some limited exceptions apply. Players may hold more than one non-FIFA nationality.

No.	Pos.	Nation	Player
--	GK	WAL	Ron Howells
--	GK	WAL	Iorrie Hughes
--	DF	WAL	Colin Gale
--	DF	WAL	Ken Hollyman
--	DF	ENG	Stan Montgomery
--	DF	ENG	Charles Rutter
--	DF	WAL	Alf Sherwood
--	DF	WAL	Albert Stitfall
--	DF	WAL	Ron Stitfall
--	DF	WAL	Derrick Sullivan
--	DF	WAL	Glyn Williams
--	MF	WAL	Billy Baker
--	MF	WAL	Alan Harrington
--	MF	NIR	Bobby McLaughlin
--	MF	ENG	Don Moss

No.	Pos.	Nation	Player
--	MF	WAL	Griff Norman
--	MF	ENG	Cliff Nugent
--	MF	ENG	Mike Tiddy
--	MF	WAL	Crad Wilcox
--	MF	WAL	Roley Williams
--	FW	ENG	Doug Blair
--	FW	ENG	Ken Chisholm
--	FW	WAL	George Edwards
--	FW	WAL	Elfed Evans
--	FW	ENG	Leslie Evans
--	FW	ENG	Wilf Grant
--	FW	WAL	Marwood Marchant
--	FW	WAL	Ken Oakley
--	FW	WAL	Colin Webster

== Fixtures and results ==
=== Second Division ===
18 August 1951 1	Cardiff City	4–0	Leicester City	Cardiff
15:15	George Edwards; Wilf Grant; Wilf Grant; Roley Williams			Stadium: Ninian Park; Attendance: 28,973; Referee: SV Davis (Oxford)

20 August 1951 2	Cardiff City	2–4	Rotherham United	Cardiff
18:15	Wilf Grant; Wilf Grant		Danny Williams; Jack Shaw; Jack Shaw; Jack Grainger	Stadium: Ninian Park; Attendance: 32,442; Referee: Edgar (SE) Law (West Bromwich)

25 August 1951 3	Nottingham Forest	2–3	Cardiff City	Nottingham
15:00	Colin Collindridge 9' (pen.); Wally Ardron 44'	Forest report	14', 43' George Edwards; 40' Roley Williams	Stadium: City Ground; Attendance: 31,776; Referee: Bill Dellow (Croydon)

27 August 1951 4	Rotherham United	2–0	Cardiff City	Rotherham
18:15	Charlie Tomlinson; Norman Noble (pen.)			Stadium: Millmoor; Attendance: 17,062; Referee: Edgar (SE) Law (West Bromwich)

1 September 1951 5	Cardiff City	2–0	Brentford	Cardiff
15:15	Wilf Grant; Wilf Grant			Stadium: Ninian Park; Attendance: 27,772; Referee: AW Smith (Aldershot)

8 September 1951 6	Doncaster Rovers	1–0	Cardiff City	Doncaster
	Arthur Adey 10'			Stadium: Belle Vue; Attendance: 19,676; Referee: WR Barnes (Birmingham)

12 September 1951 7	Leeds United	2–1	Cardiff City	Leeds
	Charlie Hughes 35'; Jim Milburn 88'		60' Elfed Evans	Stadium: Elland Road; Attendance: 12,680; Referee: George Pankhurst (Warwick)

15 September 1951 8	Cardiff City	3–1	Everton	Cardiff
15:15	Wilf Grant 59'; Wilf Grant 63'; Elfed Evans 75'		72' Ted Buckle	Stadium: Ninian Park; Attendance: 23,923; Referee: Stanley Rogers (Shrewsbury)

17 September 1951 9	Cardiff City	1–1	Sheffield United	Cardiff
17:45	Wilf Grant		Jimmy Hagan	Stadium: Ninian Park; Attendance: 29,176; Referee: WH Clapton (London)

22 September 1951 10	Southampton	1–1	Cardiff City	Southampton
15:00	Henry Horton		Mike Tiddy	Stadium: The Dell; Attendance: 21,672; Referee: AW Smith (Aldershot)

29 September 1951 11	Cardiff City	2–1	Sheffield Wednesday	Cardiff
15:15	Wilf Grant; Wilf Grant		Jackie Sewell	Stadium: Ninian Park; Attendance: 30,352; Referee: HJ Wright

6 October 1951 12	Cardiff City	4–1	Coventry City	Cardiff
15:15	Wilf Grant 56', 77': George Edwards 85'; Mike Tiddy 88'		89' Noel Simpson	Stadium: Ninian Park; Attendance: 26,277; Referee: WT (Bill) Elliott (Swindon)

13 October 1951 13	West Ham United	1–1	Cardiff City	London
15:00	Bert Hawkins		Bobby McLaughlin	Stadium: Upton Park; Attendance: 24,103; Referee: Norman Taylor (Westbury)

27 October 1951 14	Barnsley	2–0	Cardiff City	Barnsley
	Cec McCormack; Eddie McMorran			Stadium: Oakwell; Attendance: 11,168; Referee: Charles Bucknall (Birmingham)

3 November 1951 15	Cardiff City	1–0	Hull City	Cardiff
14:45	Wilf Grant 70'			Stadium: Ninian Park; Attendance: 23,459; Referee: Arthur Blythe (London)

10 November 1951 16	Blackburn Rovers	0–1	Cardiff City	Blackburn
			85' George Edwards	Stadium: Ewood Park; Attendance: 22,477; Referee: EPL Greig

17 November 1951 17	Cardiff City	3–1	Queens Park Rangers	Cardiff
14:30	Doug Blair; Doug Blair; Alf Sherwood (pen.)		Harry Gilberg	Stadium: Ninian Park; Attendance: 21,211; Referee: George Roden (Stourbridge)

24 November 1951 18	Notts County	1–1	Cardiff City	Nottingham
	Jimmy Jackson 1'		79' Stan Montgomery	Stadium: Meadow Lane; Attendance: 19,452; Referee: E Crawford

1 December 1951 19	Cardiff City	3–0	Luton Town	Cardiff
14:30	Doug Blair 44', 84'; Wilf Grant 80'	Luton report		Stadium: Ninian Park; Attendance: 26,106; Referee: Roland Burgess (Reading)

8 December 1951 20	Bury	1–1	Cardiff City	Bury
14:15	Johnny Simm		George Edwards	Stadium: Gigg Lane; Attendance: 7,887; Referee: Alf Bond (London)

15 December 1951 21	Leicester City	3–0	Cardiff City	Leicester
	Derek Hines; Arthur Rowley; Fred Worthington			Stadium: Filbert Street; Attendance: 26,021; Referee: SV Davis (Cheltenham)

22 December 1951 22	Cardiff City	4–1	Nottingham Forest	Cardiff
14:30	Alf Sherwood 12' (pen.); Doug Blair 23', 41'; Wilf Grant 80'	Forest report	64' Tommy Capel	Stadium: Ninian Park; Attendance: 19,860; Referee: WE (Bill) Dellow (Croydon)

25 December 1951 23	Swansea Town	1–1	Cardiff City	Swansea
14:30	Billy Baker (o.g.)		Mike Tiddy	Stadium: Vetch Field; Attendance: 19,260; Referee: Norman Taylor (Wiltshire)

26 December 1951 24	Cardiff City	3–0	Swansea Town	Cardiff
14:30	Billy Baker 12'; Wilf Grant 55'; Mike Tiddy 75'			Stadium: Ninian Park; Attendance: 46,003; Referee: Norman Taylor (Wiltshire)

29 December 1951 25	Brentford	1–1	Cardiff City	London
	Johnny Paton		Mike Tiddy	Stadium: Griffin Park; Attendance: 27,547; Referee: AW Smith (Aldershot)

5 January 1952 26	Cardiff City	2–1	Doncaster Rovers	Cardiff
14:30	Alf Sherwood 44', 56'		40' Ray Harrison	Stadium: Ninian Park; Attendance: 28,404; Referee: WR Barnes (Birmingham)

19 January 1952 27	Everton	3–0	Cardiff City	Liverpool
	Dave Hickson 19'; Tommy Clinton 60' (pen.); Tony McNamara			Stadium: Goodison Park; Attendance: 49,230; Referee: Stanley Rogers (Shrewsbury)

26 January 1952 28	Cardiff City	1–0	Southampton	Cardiff
15:00	Wilf Grant 42'			Stadium: Ninian Park; Attendance: 23,205; Referee: AW Smith (Aldershot)

9 February 1952 29	Sheffield Wednesday	4–2	Cardiff City	Sheffield
15:00	Jackie Sewell (??)		(??) Elfed Evans	Stadium: Hillsborough; Attendance: 42,867; Referee: HJ Wright

16 February 1952 30	Coventry City	2–1	Cardiff City	Coventry
	Norman Lockhart 51'; Ken Chisholm 58'		8' Derrick Sullivan	Stadium: Highfield Road; Attendance: 26,410; Referee: Bill (WT) Elliott (Swindon)

1 March 1952 31	Cardiff City	1–1	West Ham United	Cardiff
15:15	Doug Blair		(o.g.) Stan Montgomery	Stadium: Ninian Park; Attendance: 29,495; Referee: Norman Taylor (Wiltshire)

12 March 1952 32	Sheffield United	6–1	Cardiff City	Sheffield
15:00	George Hutchinson; Len Browning (??); Derek Hawksworth; Alf Ringstead		Wilf Grant	Stadium: Bramall Lane; Attendance: 16,398; Referee: WH Clapton (London)

15 March 1952 33	Cardiff City	3–0	Barnsley	Cardiff
15:15	Ken Chisholm; Ken Chisholm; Leslie Evans			Stadium: Ninian Park; Attendance: 24,542; Referee: Charles Bucknall (Birmingham)

22 March 1952 34	Hull City	0–0	Cardiff City	Hull
15:15				Stadium: Boothferry Park; Attendance: 27,009; Referee: Arthur (AH) Blythe (London)

5 April 1952 35	Queens Park Rangers	1–1	Cardiff City	London
15:15	Conway Smith		Wilf Grant	Stadium: Loftus Road; Attendance: 17,938; Referee: George Roden (Stourbridge)

11 April 1952 36	Birmingham City	3–2	Cardiff City	Birmingham
	Tommy Briggs; Ken Green; Alf Sherwood (o.g.)		Wilf Grant; Ken Chisholm	Stadium: St Andrew's; Attendance: 32,941; Referee: AW Smith (Aldershot)

12 April 1952 37	Cardiff City	1–0	Notts County	Cardiff
15:15	Ken Chisholm			Stadium: Ninian Park; Attendance: 24,178; Referee: H Ball (Worcester)

14 April 1952 38	Cardiff City	3–1	Birmingham City	Cardiff
15:15	Ken Chisholm; Ken Chisholm; Wilf Grant		Tommy Briggs	Stadium: Ninian Park; Attendance: 25,470; Referee: AW Smith (Aldershot)

19 April 1952 39	Luton Town	2–2	Cardiff City	Luton
15:00	Hugh McJarrow 4'; Bernard Moore	Luton report	42' (pen.) Alf Sherwood; 79' Roley Williams	Stadium: Kenilworth Road; Attendance: 14,186; Referee: Roland Burgess (Reading)

21 April 1952 40	Cardiff City	3–1	Blackburn Rovers	Cardiff
18:15	Wilf Grant; Ken Chisholm; Alf Sherwood (pen.)		Archie Wright	Stadium: Ninian Park; Attendance: 31,169

26 April 1952 41	Cardiff City	3–0	Bury	Cardiff
15:15	Doug Blair; Doug Blair; Wilf Grant			Stadium: Ninian Park; Attendance: 39,906; Referee: Alf Bond (London)

3 May 1952 42	Cardiff City	3–1	Leeds United	Cardiff
15:15	Wilf Grant 29', 43'; Ken Chisholm 56'		88' Ray Iggleden	Stadium: Ninian Park; Attendance: 45,925; Referee: George Pankhurst (Warwick)

=== FA Cup ===
12 January 1952 Round 3	Cardiff City	1–1	Swindon Town	Cardiff
14:15	Wilf Grant 40'	Swindon report	62' Maurice Owen	Stadium: Ninian Park; Attendance: 40,000; Referee: AW Smith (Aldershot)

16 January 1952 Round 3 (Replay)	Swindon Town	1–0 (a.e.t.)	Cardiff City	Swindon
14:00	Maurice Owen 115'	Swindon report		Stadium: County Ground; Attendance: 24,207; Referee: AW Smith (Aldershot)

=== Welsh Cup ===
3 January 1952 Round 5	Milford United	1–3	Cardiff City	Milford Haven
	Goal		Crad Wilcox; Crad Wilcox; Elfed Evans	Attendance: 2,500

2 February 1952 Round 6	Merthyr Tydfil	3–1	Cardiff City	Merthyr Tydfil
	Goal		George Edwards	Stadium: Penydarren Park; Attendance: 13,000

== See also ==
- List of Cardiff City F.C. seasons
