= 1953–54 Cardiff City F.C. season =

Welsh football club season

Cardiff City
1953–54 season
- Chairman: (Wales) John Morgan
- Manager: (England) Cyril Spiers
- Division One: 10th
- FA Cup: 4th round
- Welsh Cup: Semi-finals
- Top goalscorer: League: Ken Chisholm & Wilf Grant (12); All: Wilf Grant (15)
- Highest home attendance: 49,137 v Arsenal, 26 September 1953
- Lowest home attendance: 15,777 v Sheffield Wednesday, 24 April 1954
- Average home league attendance: 32,410
Home colours

The 1953–54 season was Cardiff City F.C.'s 27th season in the Football League. They competed in the 22-team Division One, then the first tier of English football, finishing tenth.

The season would also be the last time the club was managed by Cyril Spiers who, in his second spell at the club, is still Cardiff City's second longest serving manager of all time. His fourteen years at Ninian Park placing him second only to Fred Stewart.

== Season review ==
=== Partial league table ===
Pos	Team	Pld	W	D	L	GF	GA	GAv	Pts
8	Chelsea	42	16	12	14	74	68	1.088	44
9	Charlton Athletic	42	19	6	17	75	77	0.974	44
10	Cardiff City	42	18	8	16	51	71	0.718	44
11	Preston North End	42	19	5	18	87	58	1.500	43
12	Arsenal	42	15	13	14	75	73	1.027	43

Source: World Football
Rules for classification: 1) Points; 2) Goal average; 3) Goals scored

=== Results by round ===
Round	1	2	3	4	5	6	7	8	9	10	11	12	13	14	15	16	17	18	19	20	21	22	23	24	25	26	27	28	29	30	31	32	33	34	35	36	37	38	39	40	41	42
Ground	A	H	A	A	H	H	A	A	H	H	H	A	A	H	A	H	A	H	A	H	A	H	A	A	H	H	A	H	A	A	H	H	A	H	A	H	A	H	A	A	H	H
Result	D	W	L	L	W	D	W	D	W	D	L	D	W	W	L	W	L	L	L	W	L	W	W	L	D	L	L	L	L	D	W	W	W	W	L	W	W	W	L	W	L	D
Position	8	4	13	17	13	13	6	10	5	7	8	10	7	7	7	6	8	8	13	10	11	8	6	11	8	9	12	13	15	16	15	13	11	9	10	10	10	10	10	9	11	10
Points	1	3	3	3	5	6	8	9	11	12	12	13	15	17	17	19	19	19	19	21	21	23	25	25	26	26	26	26	26	27	29	31	33	35	35	37	39	41	41	43	43	44

A = Away; H = Home; W = Win; D = Draw; L = Loss

=== FA Cup ===
After a 3–1 victory over Midland Football League side Peterborough United in the third round, Cardiff were eliminated in round four by Third Division North side Port Vale.

=== Welsh Cup ===
Drawn against Barry Town in their first match, a 1–1 draw lead to a replay with Cardiff advancing after a 4–2 win. After receiving a bye in the sixth round, Cardiff were then drawn against Merthyr Tydfil in the seventh round and advanced to the semi-finals with a 5–3 victory. The club's campaign came to an end in the semi-finals for a consecutive season after a 2–1 defeat to Flint Town United.

== Players ==
Note: Flags indicate national team as defined under FIFA eligibility rules; some limited exceptions apply. Players may hold more than one non-FIFA nationality.

No.	Pos.	Nation	Player
--	GK	WAL	Ken Jones
--	GK	WAL	Ron Howells
--	GK	WAL	Graham Vearncombe
--	DF	WAL	Colin Baker
--	DF	WAL	Ron Davies
--	DF	WAL	John Frowen
--	DF	WAL	Colin Gale
--	DF	WAL	Ken Hollyman
--	DF	ENG	Jack Mansell
--	DF	ENG	Stan Montgomery
--	DF	WAL	Harry Parfitt
--	DF	ENG	Charles Rutter
--	DF	WAL	Alf Sherwood
--	DF	WAL	Ron Stitfall
--	DF	WAL	Derrick Sullivan
--	MF	WAL	Billy Baker
--	MF	WAL	Dennis Callan
--	MF	WAL	Alan Harrington

No.	Pos.	Nation	Player
--	MF	WAL	Islwyn Jones
--	MF	NIR	Bobby McLaughlin
--	MF	ENG	Cliff Nugent
--	MF	ENG	Mike Tiddy
--	MF	WAL	Roley Williams
--	MF	WAL	John Lloyd Williams
--	FW	ENG	Doug Blair
--	FW	ENG	Ken Chisholm
--	FW	ENG	Frank Dudley
--	FW	WAL	George Edwards
--	FW	WAL	Trevor Ford
--	FW	ENG	Wilf Grant
--	FW	ENG	Tommy Northcott
--	FW	WAL	Ken Oakley
--	FW	ENG	Johnny Rainford
--	FW	ENG	Brian Rutter
--	FW	WAL	Peter Thomas
--	FW	ENG	Keith Thomas

== Fixtures and results ==
=== First Division ===
19 August 1953 1	Middlesbrough	0–0	Cardiff City	Middlesbrough
				Stadium: Ayresome Park; Attendance: 33,726; Referee: Ken Collinge (Worcester)

22 August 1953 2	Cardiff City	2–1	Aston Villa	Cardiff
15:15	Johnny Rainford 5'; Peter Thomas 23'		78' Johnny Dixon	Stadium: Ninian Park; Attendance: 36,671; Referee: Alf Bond (Fulham)

26 August 1953 3	Huddersfield Town	2–0	Cardiff City	Huddersfield
	Jimmy Watson 7'; Vic Metcalfe 75'			Stadium: Leeds Road; Attendance: 30,089; Referee: Robert Mann (Worcester)

29 August 1953 4	Wolverhampton Wanderers	3–1	Cardiff City	Wolverhampton
	Dennis Wilshaw 34'; Jimmy Mullen 38'; Johnny Hancocks 39' (pen.)		13' Wilf Grant	Stadium: Molineux; Attendance: 33,221; Referee: Bill Clapton (Bermondsey)

2 September 1953 5	Cardiff City	2–1	Huddersfield Town	Cardiff
18:15	Wilf Grant 25'; Ken Chisholm 63'		35' Jimmy Glazzard	Stadium: Ninian Park; Attendance: 29,446; Referee: Robert Mann (Worcester)

5 September 1953 6	Cardiff City	1–1	Sunderland	Cardiff
15:15	Ken Chisholm 75'		76' Tommy Wright	Stadium: Ninian Park; Attendance: 42,002; Referee: Frank Fiander (Bucks)

7 September 1953 7	Sheffield United	0–1	Cardiff City	Sheffield
18:15			85' Ken Chisholm	Stadium: Bramall Lane; Attendance: 34,043; Referee: Joe McCann (Preston)

12 September 1953 8	Manchester City	1–1	Cardiff City	Manchester
	Stan Montgomery 46' (o.g.)		66' George Edwards	Stadium: Maine Road; Attendance: 31,915; Referee: Arthur Smith (Aldershot)

16 September 1953 9	Cardiff City	2–0	Sheffield United	Cardiff
17:45	George Edwards 85'; Wilf Grant 88'			Stadium: Ninian Park; Attendance: 27,350; Referee: Joe McCann (Preston)

19 September 1953 10	Cardiff City	1–1	Bolton Wanderers	Cardiff
15:15	Ken Chisholm 58'		10' Harold Hassall	Stadium: Ninian Park; Attendance: 35,788; Referee: Stanley Rogers (Shrewsbury)

26 September 1953 11	Cardiff City	0–3	Arsenal	Cardiff
15:15			17', 80' Doug Lishman; 66' (o.g.) Jack Mansell	Stadium: Ninian Park; Attendance: 49,137; Referee: Roland Burgess (Reading)

3 October 1953 12	Portsmouth	1–1	Cardiff City	Portsmouth
15:00	Charlie Vaughan 61'		60' Derrick Sullivan	Stadium: Fratton Park; Attendance: 31,766; Referee: Harry Pearce (Luton)

10 October 1953 13	Preston North End	1–2	Cardiff City	Preston
	Dennis Hatsell 28'		50', 55' Ken Chisholm	Stadium: Deepdale; Attendance: 23,500; Referee: Arthur Smith (Aldershot)

17 October 1953 14	Cardiff City	1–0	Tottenham Hotspur	Cardiff
15:15	Wilf Grant 45' (pen.)			Stadium: Ninian Park; Attendance: 41,083; Referee: Henry Ball (Worcester)

24 October 1953 15	Burnley	3–0	Cardiff City	Burnley
	Jimmy McIlroy 32'; Billy Gray 69'; Brian Pilkington 73'			Stadium: Turf Moor; Attendance: 25,539; Referee: Harry Broadhurst (Atherstone)

31 October 1953 16	Cardiff City	5–0	Charlton Athletic	Cardiff
15:00	Frank Dudley 24'; Ken Chisholm 49', 52', 53'; Mike Tiddy 88'			Stadium: Ninian Park; Attendance: 25,340; Referee: Norman Taylor (Wiltshire)

7 November 1953 17	Newcastle United	4–0	Cardiff City	Newcastle
14:30	Jackie Milburn 29'; Ivor Broadis 33', 69'; George Hannah 83'			Stadium: St James's Park; Attendance: 42,355; Referee: Harry Pearce (Luton)

14 November 1953 18	Cardiff City	1–6	Manchester United	Cardiff
14:30	Ken Chisholm 30'		3', 80' Dennis Viollet; 4' Jack Rowley; 48' Johnny Berry; 52' Tommy Taylor; 87' Jackie Blanchflower	Stadium: Ninian Park; Attendance: 26,844; Referee: Dick Hall (Middlesex)

21 November 1953 19	West Bromwich Albion	6–1	Cardiff City	West Bromwich
	Ronnie Allen 14', 28', 35', 51'; Johnny Nicholls 79', 83'		5' Ken Chisholm	Stadium: The Hawthorns; Attendance: 39,444; Referee: John Jackson (Watford)

28 November 1953 20	Cardiff City	3–1	Liverpool	Cardiff
14:30	Wilf Grant 74'; Ken Chisholm 75'; George Edwards 88'	LFC Report	38' Louis Bimpson	Stadium: Ninian Park; Attendance: 21,284; Referee: Charles Bucknall (Birmingham)

5 December 1953 21	Sheffield Wednesday	2–1	Cardiff City	Sheffield
14:15	Redfern Froggatt 6'; Jackie Sewell 48'		65' Ken Chisholm	Stadium: Hillsborough; Attendance: 26,597; Referee: Sidney Perry (Cradley, Staffordshire)

12 December 1953 22	Cardiff City	1–0	Middlesbrough	Cardiff
14:30	Trevor Ford 23'			Stadium: Ninian Park; Attendance: 31,776; Referee: Ken Collinge (Cheshire)

19 December 1953 23	Aston Villa	1–2	Cardiff City	Birmingham
14:15	Johnny Dixon 62'		22', 42' Tommy Northcott	Stadium: Villa Park; Attendance: 27,012; Referee: Alf Bond (Fulham)

26 December 1953 24	Chelsea	2–0	Cardiff City	London
14:15	Frank Blunstone 46'; Les Stubbs 89'			Stadium: Stamford Bridge; Attendance: 61,336; Referee: Norman C Taylor (Westbury)

28 December 1953 25	Cardiff City	0–0	Chelsea	Cardiff
14:30				Stadium: Ninian Park; Attendance: 36,958; Referee: Norman C Taylor (Westbury)

2 January 1954 26	Cardiff City	1–3	Wolverhampton Wanderers	Cardiff
14:30	Cliff Nugent 59'		20' Roy Swinbourne; 37' Dennis Wilshaw; 82' Johnny Hancocks	Stadium: Ninian Park; Attendance: 42,521; Referee: Bill Clapton (Bermondsey)

16 January 1954 27	Sunderland	5–0	Cardiff City	Sunderland
	Tommy Wright 9', 14'; Len Shackleton 43'; Ted Purdon 72', 74'			Stadium: Roker Park; Attendance: 40,629; Referee: Les Wood (Bury)

23 January 1954 28	Cardiff City	0–3	Manchester City	Cardiff
15:00			Harry Anders; Roy Clarke; 26' Don Revie	Stadium: Ninian Park; Attendance: 22,516; Referee: Arthur Smith (Aldershot)

6 February 1954 29	Bolton Wanderers	3–0	Cardiff City	Bolton
	Nat Lofthouse 26'; Willie Moir 84'; Dennis Stevens 85'			Stadium: Burnden Park; Attendance: 30,777; Referee: William Rogers (Birmingham)

13 February 1954 30	Arsenal	1–1	Cardiff City	London
15:00	Doug Lishman 18'		10' Trevor Ford	Stadium: Highbury; Attendance: 45,497; Referee: Roland Burgess (Reading)

27 February 1954 31	Cardiff City	2–1	Preston North End	Cardiff
15:00	Wilf Grant 3'; Wilf Grant		13' Tom Finney	Stadium: Ninian Park; Attendance: 30,502; Referee: Arthur W Smith (Aldershot)

3 March 1954 32	Cardiff City	3–2	Portsmouth	Cardiff
15:30	Cliff Nugent 25'; Mike Tiddy 44'; Wilf Grant 90'		23' Dick Pearson; 72' Duggie Reid	Stadium: Ninian Park; Attendance: 17,842; Referee: William Elliott (Swindon)

6 March 1954 33	Tottenham Hotspur	0–1	Cardiff City	London
			21' Mike Tiddy	Stadium: White Hart Lane; Attendance: 45,248; Referee: Henry Ball (Worcester)

13 March 1954 34	Cardiff City	1–0	Burnley	Cardiff
15:15	Derrick Sullivan 89'			Stadium: Ninian Park; Attendance: 33,413; Referee: Harry Broadhurst (Atherstone)

20 March 1954 35	Charlton Athletic	3–2	Cardiff City	London
	Gordon Hurst 16'; Eddie Firmani 23'; Stuart Leary 72'		44' Wilf Grant; 49' Trevor Ford	Stadium: The Valley; Attendance: 20,717; Referee: Norman Taylor (Wiltshire)

27 March 1954 36	Cardiff City	2–1	Newcastle United	Cardiff
15:15	Cliff Nugent 68'; Mike Tiddy 77'		10' Alan Monkhouse	Stadium: Ninian Park; Attendance: 26,242; Referee: Harry Pearce (Luton)

3 April 1954 37	Manchester United	2–3	Cardiff City	Manchester
15:00	Dennis Viollet 30'; Jack Rowley 75'		77', 87' Wilf Grant; 79' Derrick Sullivan	Stadium: Old Trafford; Attendance: 24,616; Referee: Dick Hall (Harrow)

10 April 1954 38	Cardiff City	2–0	West Bromwich Albion	Cardiff
15:15	Wilf Grant 48'; Trevor Ford 74'			Stadium: Ninian Park; Attendance: 43,614; Referee: John B Jackson (Watford)

16 April 1954 39	Blackpool	4–1	Cardiff City	Blackpool
15:00	Allan Brown; Stan Mortensen; Ernie Taylor; Bill Perry		Trevor Ford	Stadium: Bloomfield Road; Attendance: 26,194; Referee: Robert Mann (Worcester)

17 April 1954 40	Liverpool	0–1	Cardiff City	Liverpool
15:00		LFC report	43' Tommy Northcott	Stadium: Anfield; Attendance: 41,340; Referee: Charles Bucknall (Birmingham)

19 April 1954 41	Cardiff City	0–1	Blackpool	Cardiff
15:15			79' Bill Perry	Stadium: Ninian Park; Attendance: 44,508; Referee: Robert Mann (Worcester)

24 April 1954 42	Cardiff City	2–2	Sheffield Wednesday	Cardiff
15:15	Alf Sherwood 26' (pen.); Trevor Ford 40'		31' Jackie Sewell; 59' Dennis Woodhead	Stadium: Ninian Park; Attendance: 15,777; Referee: Sidney Perry (Cradley, Staffordshire)

=== FA Cup ===
9 January 1954 Round 3	Cardiff City	3–1	Peterborough United	Cardiff
14:15	Trevor Ford; Trevor Ford; Tommy Northcott		Martin	Stadium: Ninian Park; Attendance: 34,000; Referee: John Jackson (Watford)

30 January 1954 Round 4	Cardiff City	0–2	Port Vale	Cardiff
14:45			Ken Griffiths; Albert Leake	Stadium: Ninian Park; Attendance: 27,000; Referee: Len Howarth (Beverley)

=== Welsh Cup ===
20 January 1954 Round 5	Barry Town	1–1	Cardiff City	Barry
	Goal		C Burder	Stadium: Jenner Park; Attendance: 2,500

10 February 1954 Round 5 (Replay)	Cardiff City	4–2	Barry Town	Cardiff
	Trevor Ford; Mike Tiddy; Cliff Nugent; Cliff Nugent		Goal	Stadium: Ninian Park; Attendance: 4,500

20 February 1954 Round 7	Merthyr Tydfil	3–5	Cardiff City	Merthyr Tydfil
15:00	Goal		Wilf Grant; Wilf Grant; Wilf Grant (o.g.) H Lowe; Cliff Nugent	Stadium: Penydarren Park; Attendance: 7,000

24 March 1954 Semi Final	Flint Town United	2–1	Cardiff City	Wrexham
	Goal		Tommy Northcott	Stadium: The Racecourse; Attendance: 10,500

== See also ==
- List of Cardiff City F.C. seasons
