= List of Cardiff City F.C. seasons =

Cardiff City Football Club, a professional association football club based in Cardiff, Wales, was founded in 1899 as Riverside A.F.C. by members of Riverside Cricket Club. The club's first year was made up of friendlies before they were admitted to the Cardiff & District League in 1900 and later the South Wales League in 1907. The following year, the club were granted permission to adopt the name Cardiff City, having been denied the previous year as they were deemed not to be playing at a high enough level, and moved into the English football league system for the first time by joining Division Two of the Southern Football League. They won promotion to Division One in the 1912–13 season and remained there until 1920, playing just three seasons during this time due to the outbreak of the First World War when league football was abandoned. In 1920, they were elected to The Football League, joining the Second Division for one season, winning promotion in their first season after finishing second. The club also competed regularly in the Welsh Cup, winning the trophy 22 times during their history, second only to Wrexham's 23, before they were denied entrance into the competition from 1995 onward by the Football Association of Wales, along with all other clubs playing in the English league pyramid.

The following decade is regarded as the most successful in the club's history as they finished second during the 1923–24 season, losing out on winning the league title on the goal average system used at the time to Huddersfield Town. During this period, they reached two FA Cup finals, losing 1–0 to Sheffield United in 1925 before returning to the final two years later, beating Arsenal 1–0 at Wembley Stadium in 1927. They also won the FA Charity Shield after beating amateur side Corinthians 2–1. Cardiff remain the only non-English side to have ever won the FA Cup or FA Charity Shield.

Cardiff City's league positions between 1920 and 2026

Cardiff were relegated for the first time in their history in 1929 and entered a period of decline, dropping into the third tier two years later. The club did manage to return to the top tier in 1952, but their relegation in 1962 led to a decline in the club's fortunes that saw them outside the top division for 51 years, the longest absence in the club's history, not returning until 2013. Relegation from Division Two in the 1984–85 season saw the club enter a downward period that culminated with their joint lowest ever finish in the Football League, 22nd in the fourth tier in the 1995–96 season.

In 2000, the club was purchased by Lebanese businessman Sam Hammam, who invested money into the side and saw them rise from the fourth tier to the second tier in just three seasons. Although Hammam left the club in 2006, they continued their progress, reaching the Football League Championship play-offs for three consecutive seasons between 2009 and 2012, suffering defeat on all three occasions. The following season, under the ownership of new owner Vincent Tan, they finished first in the Championship, winning promotion back into the top tier for the first time since 1962. However, they suffered relegation in their only season and returned to the Championship.

As of the end of the 2025–26 season, the club had spent 17 seasons in the top tier of English football, 51 in the second, 21 in the third and 10 in the fourth. This list details their achievements in first-team competitions, and records their top goalscorer, for each completed season since their first appearance in the English football pyramid as members of the Southern Football League in 1910–11. Due to the unavailability of complete statistics, seasons prior to 1910 in the amateur Welsh leagues are not included.

== Key ==
Key to league record:

- Pld = Matches played
- W = Matches won
- D = Matches drawn
- L = Matches lost
- GF = Goals for
- GA = Goals against
- Pts = Points
- Pos = Final position

Key to divisions:

- SL Div 1 = Southern Football League First Division
- SL Div 2 = Southern Football League Second Division
- Div 1 = Football League First Division
- Div 2 = Football League Second Division
- Div 3 = Football League Third Division
- Div 4 = Football League Fourth Division
- Champ = EFL Championship
- Prem = Premier League

Key to rounds:

- GS = Group Stages
- QR = Qualifying round
- R1 = Round 1
- R2 = Round 2
- R3 = Round 3
- R4 = Round 4
- R5 = Round 5
- QF = Quarter-finals
- SF = Semi-finals
- RU = Runners-up
- W = Winners

Key to colours and symbols:

1st or W	Winners
2nd or RU	Runners-up
↑	Promoted
↓	Relegated
*	Promoted via play-offs
♦	Top league scorer in Cardiff's division

== Seasons ==
Season	League									FA Cup	League Cup (Note: The Football League Cup was founded in the 1960–61 season)	Welsh Cup (Note: Cardiff City were denied entry to the competition from 1995 onward along with all other Welsh clubs playing in the English pyramid system.)	Other		Top scorer(s) (Note: Goals in all competitions (Football League or Premier League, FA Cup, EFL Cup, EFL Trophy, European, Welsh Cup and Football League Third Division South Cup) are counted)		Average Home Attendance (Note: Home league matches only are counted)
Season	Division (Note: Divisions are sorted according to their level within the English football league system at the time.)	Pld	W	D	L	GF	GA	Pts	Pos	FA Cup	League Cup	Welsh Cup	Competition	Result	Player(s)	Goals	Average Home Attendance
1910–11	SL Div 2	22	12	4	6	48	29	28	4th	1QR		2R			Richard Peake	19	
1911–12	SL Div 2	26	15	4	7	55	26	34	3rd	2QR		W			Harry Featherstone	16	
1912–13	SL Div 2 ↑	24	18	5	1	54	14	41	1st	5QR		SF			John Burton	16	
1913–14	SL Div 1	38	13	12	13	46	42	38	10th	n/a (Note: Cardiff City did not enter the FA Cup during the 1913–14 season)		3R			George West	10	
1914–15	SL Div 1	38	21	7	10	72	38	48	3rd	1R		3R (Note: Cardiff City entered the competition in the third round, being drawn against Pontypridd Town, but withdrew from the tournament, handing the opposition a walkover victory.)			George West	13	
1915–19	The Southern League was suspended until after the First World War.																
1919–20	SL Div 1	42	18	17	7	70	43	53	4th	3R		W			Arthur Cashmore	14	
1920–21	Div 2 (Note: Cardiff were invited to join The Football League in 1920)↑	42	24	10	8	59	32	58	2nd	SF		n/a (Note: Cardiff City entered their reserve side in the Welsh Cup for the 1920–21 season.)			Jimmy Gill	20	28,000
1921–22	Div 1	42	19	10	13	61	53	48	4th	QF		W			Len Davies	30	27,500
1922–23	Div 1	42	18	7	17	73	59	43	9th	3R		W			Len Davies	28	28,238
1923–24	Div 1	42	22	13	7	61	34	57	2nd (Note: Cardiff City finished second to Huddersfield Town due to the goal average system used at the time.)	QF		5R			Len Davies	24	29,324
1924–25	Div 1	42	16	11	15	56	51	43	11th	RU		5R			Len Davies	22	21,238
1925–26	Div 1	42	16	7	19	61	76	39	16th	4R		5R			Hughie Ferguson	21	17,946
1926–27	Div 1	42	16	9	17	55	65	41	14th	W		W			Hughie Ferguson	31	15,424
1927–28	Div 1	42	17	10	15	70	80	44	6th	5R		W	FA Charity Shield	W (Note: As winners of the FA Cup during the previous season, Cardiff City entered the FA Charity Shield, defeating amateur side Corinthian 2–1.)	Hughie Ferguson	25	15,607
1928–29	Div 1 ↓	42	8	13	21	43	59	29	22nd	3R		RU			Hughie Ferguson	15	14,880
1929–30	Div 2	42	18	8	16	61	59	44	8th	4R		W (Note: Cardiff City won the tournament by defeating Rhyl in a replay which was not played until 8 October 1930, during the following season.)			Len Davies	15	12,944
1930–31	Div 2 ↓	42	8	9	25	47	87	25	22nd	3R		SF			Walter Robbins	12	8,267
1931–32	Div 3S	42	19	8	15	87	73	46	9th	1R		6R			Jimmy McCambridge	28	7,684
1932–33	Div 3S	42	12	7	23	69	99	31	19th	1R		SF			Jimmy McCambridge	18	7,008
1933–34	Div 3S	42	9	6	27	57	105	24	22nd (Note: Cardiff City were forced to apply for re-election after finishing bottom of the Third Division South.)	1R		6R	Third Division South Cup	1R	Jim Henderson Eli Postin	13	7,959
1934–35	Div 3S	42	13	9	20	62	82	35	19th	1R		7R	Third Division South Cup	2R	Reg Keating	19	9,908
1935–36	Div 3S	42	13	10	19	60	73	36	20th	1R		7R	Third Division South Cup	1R	Reg Keating	11	9,528
1936–37	Div 3S	42	14	7	21	54	87	35	18th	3R		6R	Third Division South Cup	2R	George Walton	9	15,661
1937–38	Div 3S	42	15	12	15	67	54	42	10th	3R		6R	Third Division South Cup	2R	Jimmy Collins	28	20,009
1938–39	Div 3S	42	15	11	16	61	65	41	13th	4R		RU	Third Division South Cup	2R (Note: The Third Division South Cup semi-final replay and final were postponed until the following season. However, due to the outbreak of Second World War, the competition was abandoned at the semi-final stage.)	Jimmy Collins	21	14,107
1939–40	Div 3S	3	2	0	1	5	5	4	6th (Note: The Football League season was abandoned in September 1939 after three matches had been played and all results were annulled.)	—		6R (Note: The 1939–40 Welsh Cup tournament was completed.)			Jimmy Collins	4	
1939–45	The Football League was suspended until after the Second World War. (Note: The club played 254 competitive games in regional league and cup football between 1939 and 1946. Guest players were permitted, and results and records from this period are not included in official statistics.)																
1945–46	—	—	—	—	—	—	—	—	—	3R (Note: The FA Cup competition resumed for the 1945–46 season, however league football did not resume until the following season.)		—			Bryn Allen	1	
1946–47	Div 3S ↑	42	30	6	6	93	30	66	1st	3R		5R			Stan Richards	30	28,604
1947–48	Div 2	42	18	11	13	61	58	47	5th	3R		5R			Billy Rees	12	37,871
1948–49	Div 2	42	19	13	10	62	47	51	4th	5R		SF			Ernie Stevenson	14	35,091
1949–50	Div 2	42	16	10	16	41	44	42	10th	5R		7R			Elfed Evans	12	28,521
1950–51	Div 2	42	17	16	9	53	45	50	3rd	3R		RU			Wilf Grant	18	28,888
1951–52	Div 2 ↑	42	20	11	11	72	54	51	2nd	3R		6R			Wilf Grant	27	28,945
1952–53	Div 1	42	14	12	16	54	46	40	12th	3R		SF			Ken Chisholm	15	37,932
1953–54	Div 1	42	18	8	16	51	71	44	10th	4R		SF			Wilf Grant	15	32,410
1954–55	Div 1	42	13	11	18	62	76	37	20th	3R		SF			Trevor Ford	24	24,311
1955–56	Div 1	42	15	9	18	55	69	39	17th	4R		W			Gerry Hitchens	28	26,631
1956–57	Div 1 ↓	42	10	9	23	53	88	29	21st	4R		6R			Gerry Hitchens	25	20,528
1957–58	Div 2	42	14	9	19	63	77	37	15th	5R		5R			Ron Hewitt	15	15,893
1958–59	Div 2	42	18	7	17	65	65	43	9th	4R		W			Ron Hewitt	17	17,759
1959–60	Div 2 ↑	42	23	12	7	90	62	57	2nd	3R		RU			Derek Tapscott	21	24,183
1960–61	Div 1	42	13	11	18	60	85	37	15th	3R	2R	SF			Derek Tapscott	30	23,390
1961–62	Div 1 ↓	42	9	14	19	50	81	32	21st	3R	3R	SF			Dai Ward	21	19,294
1962–63	Div 2	42	18	7	17	83	73	43	10th	3R	2R	6R			Peter Hooper	24	15,567
1963–64	Div 2	42	14	10	18	56	81	38	15th	3R	2R	W			Mel Charles	17	13,782
1964–65	Div 2	42	13	14	15	64	57	40	13th	3R	2R	W	Cup Winners' Cup	QF	Ivor Allchurch	19	10,588
1965–66	Div 2	42	12	10	20	71	91	34	20th	4R	SF	5R	Cup Winners' Cup	1R	George Johnston	23	11,005
1966–67	Div 2	42	12	9	21	61	87	33	20th	4R	2R	W			Bobby Brown	17	10,258
1967–68	Div 2	42	13	12	17	60	66	38	13th	3R	2R	W	Cup Winners' Cup	SF	Peter King	18	13,301
1968–69	Div 2	42	20	7	15	67	54	47	5th	3R	2R	W	Cup Winners' Cup	1R	John Toshack (Note: Scored 22 goals in Division Two.)	31 ♦	16,870
1969–70	Div 2	42	18	13	11	61	41	49	7th	3R	2R	W	Cup Winners' Cup	2R	Brian Clark	28	21,486
1970–71	Div 2	42	20	13	9	64	41	53	3rd	4R	2R	W	Cup Winners' Cup	QF	Brian Clark	22	21,575
1971–72	Div 2	42	10	14	18	56	69	34	19th	5R	2R	RU	Cup Winners' Cup	1R	Brian Clark	27	15,539
1972–73	Div 2	42	11	11	20	43	58	33	20th	4R	1R	W			Andrew McCulloch	19	11,634
1973–74	Div 2	42	10	16	16	49	62	36	17th	3R	2R	W	Cup Winners' Cup	1R	Andrew McCulloch	14	10,678
1974–75	Div 2 ↓	42	9	14	19	36	62	32	21st	3R	1R	RU	Cup Winners' Cup	1R	Gil Reece	10	9,224
1975–76	Div 3 ↑	46	22	13	11	69	48	57	2nd	4R	1R	W			Tony Evans	29	11,696
1976–77	Div 2	42	12	10	20	56	67	34	18th	5R	2R	RU	Cup Winners' Cup	1R	Tony Evans	24	12,463
1977–78	Div 2	42	13	12	17	51	71	38	19th	3R	2R	SF	Cup Winners' Cup	1R	John Buchanan	14	8,369
1978–79	Div 2	42	16	10	16	56	70	42	9th	3R	1R	5R	Anglo-Scottish Cup	GS	John Buchanan	18	9,259
1979–80	Div 2	42	16	8	18	41	48	40	15th	3R	2R	4R			Ray Bishop Gary Stevens	11	9,932
1980–81	Div 2	42	12	12	18	44	60	36	19th	3R	3R	4R			Peter Kitchen	19	6,770
1981–82	Div 2 ↓ (Note: This season saw the introduction of three points for a win instead of two.)	42	12	8	22	45	61	44	20th	3R	1R	RU			Gary Stevens	18	5,498
1982–83	Div 3 ↑	46	25	11	10	76	50	86	2nd	2R	2R	3R			Jeff Hemmerman	26	7,730
1983–84	Div 2	42	15	6	21	53	66	51	15th	3R	2R	5R			Gordon Owen	18	7,016
1984–85	Div 2 ↓	42	9	8	25	47	79	35	21st	3R	2R	4R			Nigel Vaughan	17	4,372
1985–86	Div 3 ↓	46	12	9	25	53	83	45	22nd	1R	1R	SF	Associate Members' Cup	GS	Nigel Vaughan	17	3,433
1986–87	Div 4	46	15	16	15	48	50	61	13th	4R	4R	4R	Associate Members' Cup	GS	Paul Wimbleton	11	3,128
1987–88	Div 4 ↑	46	24	13	9	66	41	85	2nd	1R	1R	W	Associate Members' Cup	1R	Jimmy Gilligan	25	4,849
1988–89	Div 3	46	14	15	17	44	56	57	16th	3R	2R	5R	Associate Members' Cup Cup Winners' Cup	1R 2R	Jimmy Gilligan	23	4,782
1989–90	Div 3 ↓	46	12	14	20	57	70	50	21st	3R	1R	SF	Associate Members' Cup	GS	Chris Pike	23	3,630
1990–91	Div 4	46	15	15	16	43	54	60	13th	1R	2R	3R	Associate Members' Cup	GS	Chris Pike	16	2,958
1991–92	Div 4	42	17	15	10	66	53	66	9th	1R	1R	W	Associate Members' Cup	1R	Carl Dale Chris Pike	28	5,665
1992–93	Div 3 ↑ (Note: The Fourth Division was renamed Division Three after the Premier League broke away from the Football League.)	42	25	8	9	77	47	83	1st	1R	1R	W	Football League Trophy (Note: The Associate Members' Cup was renamed the Football League Trophy from the 1992–93 season.) Cup Winners' Cup	1R 1R	Phil Stant	18	7,797
1993–94	Div 2	46	13	15	18	66	79	54	19th	5R	1R	RU	Football League Trophy	2R	Phil Stant	22	6,080
1994–95	Div 2 ↓	46	9	11	26	46	74	38	22nd	1R	1R	RU	Football League Trophy Cup Winners' Cup	1R 1R	Phil Stant	15	4,543
1995–96	Div 3	46	11	12	23	41	64	45	22nd	2R	2R		Football League Trophy	1R	Carl Dale	30	3,420
1996–97	Div 3	46	20	9	17	56	54	69	7th	2R	1R		Football League Trophy	2R	Steve White	14	3,594
1997–98	Div 3	46	9	23	14	48	52	50	21st	4R	1R		Football League Trophy FAW Premier Cup	1R RU	Andy Saville	14	3,574
1998–99	Div 3 ↑	46	22	14	10	60	39	80	3rd	4R	1R		Football League Trophy FAW Premier Cup	1R SF	Kevin Nugent	22	7,131
1999–2000	Div 2 ↓	46	9	17	20	45	67	44	21st	3R	2R		Football League Trophy FAW Premier Cup	1R RU	Jason Bowen Kevin Nugent	17	6,903
2000–01	Div 3 ↑	46	23	13	10	95	58	82	2nd	3R	1R		Football League Trophy FAW Premier Cup	1R QF	Robert Earnshaw	25	7,962
2001–02	Div 2	46	23	14	9	75	50	83	4th (Note: Defeated in the Division Two play-off semi-final by Stoke City.)	4R	1R		Football League Trophy FAW Premier Cup	2R W	Graham Kavanagh	16	12,522
2002–03	Div 2 ↑	46	23	12	11	68	43	81	6th* (Note: Promoted to Division One after beating Queens Park Rangers 1–0 in the play-off final.)	3R	2R		Football League Trophy FAW Premier Cup	3R SF	Robert Earnshaw (Note: Scored 31 goals in Division Two.)	35 ♦	13,049
2003–04	Div 1	46	17	14	15	68	58	65	13th	3R	2R		FAW Premier Cup	SF	Robert Earnshaw	26	15,569
2004–05	Champ (Note: Division One was renamed The Championship from the 2004–05 season.)	46	13	15	18	48	51	54	16th	3R	4R		FAW Premier Cup	QF	Peter Thorne	14	13,029
2005–06	Champ	46	16	12	18	58	59	60	11th	3R	3R		FAW Premier Cup	QF	Cameron Jerome	20	11,802
2006–07	Champ	46	17	13	16	57	53	64	13th	3R	1R		FAW Premier Cup	SF	Michael Chopra	22	15,224
2007–08	Champ	46	16	16	14	59	55	64	12th	RU	4R		FAW Premier Cup	SF	Joe Ledley Paul Parry	11	13,939
2008–09	Champ	46	26	17	10	65	53	74	7th	4R	3R				Ross McCormack	23	18,449
2009–10	Champ	46	22	10	14	73	54	76	4th (Note: Defeated in the Championship play-off final by Blackpool.)	5R	3R				Peter Whittingham (Note: Scored 20 goals in the Championship.)	25 ♦	19,413
2010–11	Champ	46	23	11	12	76	54	80	4th (Note: Defeated in the Championship play-off semi-final by Reading.)	3R	2R				Jay Bothroyd	20	22,091
2011–12	Champ	46	19	18	9	66	53	75	6th (Note: Defeated in the Championship play-off semi-final by West Ham United.)	3R	RU				Peter Whittingham	13	22,139
2012–13	Champ ↑	46	25	12	9	72	45	87	1st	3R	1R				Heiðar Helguson	9	22,296
2013–14	Prem ↓	38	7	9	22	40	74	30	20th	5R	3R				Fraizer Campbell	9	27,430
2014–15	Champ	46	16	14	16	57	61	62	11th	4R	3R				Kenwyne Jones	11	20,945
2015–16	Champ	46	17	17	12	56	51	68	8th	3R	2R				Anthony Pilkington	9	16,463
2016–17	Champ	46	16	11	18	57	61	59	12th	3R	1R				Kenneth Zohore	12	16,564
2017–18	Champ ↑	46	27	9	10	69	39	90	2nd	4R	2R				Junior Hoilett	11	20,164
2018–19	Prem ↓	38	10	4	24	34	69	34	18th	3R	2R				Víctor Camarasa; Bobby Reid	5	31,229
2019–20	Champ	46	19	16	11	68	58	73	5th (Note: Defeated in the Championship play-off semi-final by Fulham.)	4R	2R				Lee Tomlin	9	20,738
2020–21	Champ	46	18	14	14	66	49	68	8th	3R	1R				Kieffer Moore	20	0 (Note: All games played behind closed doors due to the COVID-19 pandemic)
2021–22	Champ	46	15	8	23	50	68	53	18th	3R	2R				Aden Flint	6	18,869
2022–23	Champ	46	13	10	23	41	58	49	21st	3R	1R				Sory Kaba	8	19,455
2023–24	Champ	46	19	5	22	53	70	62	12th	3R	3R				Perry Ng; Karlan Grant	6	21,213
2024–25	Champ ↓	46	9	17	20	48	73	44	24th	5R	2R				Callum Robinson	12	19,344
2025–26	League One ↑	46	27	10	9	90	50	91	2nd	1R	QF		EFL Trophy	Round of 32	Yousef Salech	14	19,583
