= Bob Lamie =

Scottish footballer

Personal information
- Full name: Robert Lamie
- Date of birth: 28 December 1928
- Place of birth: Newarthill, Scotland
- Date of death: 1981 (aged 52–53)
- Place of death: Northampton, England
- Position: Winger

Youth career
- Stonehouse Violet

Senior career*
Years	Team	Apps	(Gls)
1949–1951	Cardiff City	6	(1)
1951–1952	Swansea Town	2	(0)
1952	Lincoln City	0	(0)
- Kettering Town
- Bedworth United
- * Club domestic league appearances and goals

Robert Lamie (28 December 1928 — 1981) was a Scottish professional footballer who played as a winger. He made eight appearances in the Football League for Cardiff City and Swansea Town.

== Career ==
Lamie had played youth football for Scottish side Stonehouse Violet before joining Cardiff City in October 1949. A month later, he was given his professional debut in a 1–0 defeat to West Ham United. He remained with the club until March 1951, making six league appearances and scoring once, but struggled to break into the first team past established players George Edwards and Mike Tiddy.

After leaving Cardiff, he signed for their local rivals Swansea Town. He made his debut for the club in a 2–2 draw with Nottingham Forest in place of Jack O'Driscoll in October 1951 but made only one further appearance before leaving the club to join Lincoln City in October 1952. However, he never played a first team match for Lincoln. He later played for Kettering Town and Bedworth United.
