= Les Evans (footballer, born 1929) =

English footballer

Personal information
- Full name: Leslie Norman Evans
- Date of birth: 13 October 1929
- Place of birth: Kingswinford, England
- Date of death: April 2007 (aged 77)
- Place of death: Cardiff, Wales
- Position: Winger

Senior career*
| Years | Team | Apps | (Gls) |
- Brierley Hill Alliance
| 1950–1952 | Cardiff City | 3 | (1) |
| 1952–1953 | Plymouth Argyle | 0 | (0) |
- * Club domestic league appearances and goals

Leslie Norman Evans (13 October 1929 – April 2007) was an English professional footballer who played as a winger.

== Career ==
After playing for Brierley Hill Alliance, Evans joined Football League side Cardiff City. However, the presence of George Edwards restricted his appearances, playing in three league matches and scoring once. He later joined Plymouth Argyle but failed to break into the first team.
