= George Hazlett =

Scottish footballer

Personal information
- Full name: George Hazlett
- Date of birth: 10 March 1923
- Place of birth: Glasgow, Scotland
- Date of death: 22 December 2012 (aged 89)
- Place of death: Bromley, England
- Position: Outside forward

Youth career
- St. Mary's Boys Club
- Blantyre Celtic

Senior career*
Years	Team	Apps	(Gls)
- Glasgow Perthshire
1946–1948	Celtic	21	(2)
1948–1949	Belfast Celtic		
1949–1952	Bury	100	(10)
1952–1953	Cardiff City	7	(1)
1953–1958	Millwall	131	(10)
1958–1959	Guildford City		
1959–1960	Bexleyheath & Welling		
Total		259	(23)
- * Club domestic league appearances and goals

George Hazlett (10 March 1923 – 22 December 2012) was a Scottish professional footballer who played as an outside-forward. Born in Glasgow, he began his career with local youth sides before appearing as a guest player for Plymouth Argyle and Celtic during the Second World War while serving in the Royal Navy. After the war, he joined Celtic permanently where he remained for two seasons.

He joined Belfast Celtic in 1948. He played in the club's final season before it resigned from the Irish League following an incident when its players were attacked by supporters of a rival team. After touring the United States in Belfast Celtic's last matches, he moved to Football League side Bury where he made over 100 appearances for the club in a three-year spell. He spent one season with Cardiff City prior to joining Millwall in 1953. He made more than 130 league appearances for Millwall before moving into non-league football.

== Early life ==
Hazlett was born in Pollokshaws in the south of Glasgow. He was raised in the city with his four siblings. His father worked as a miner.

== Career ==
=== Scotland and Ireland ===
Hazlett played for St. Mary's Boys Club and Blantyre Celtic as a teenager. Hazlett's career was postponed during the Second World War when he joined the Royal Navy, serving as a shipwright petty officer. During his service, he guested for Plymouth Argyle while stationed in the south of England. The club were competing in the wartime Football League South and he made his debut in September 1945. In November 1945, Celtic made a request to the Royal Navy for Hazlett to be excused from duty in order to play for the club in a Wartime fixture against Motherwell in place of Jimmy Delaney who was away on international duty. Flying in from Scapa Flow, he made his debut for the club in a 3–0 victory.

After the end of the war, Plymouth had hoped for Hazlett to remain but released him in order for the player to return to Scotland and join Celtic in February 1946. He made his professional debut in an Old Firm Derby match against local rivals Rangers, scoring his side's goal in a 1–1 draw. However, he struggled with a persistent knee injury that restricted his appearances for the club. Belfast Celtic captain Harry Walker met Hazlett during a scouting trip to Scotland and recommended he visit Joe Devlin, Belfast Celtic's physiotherapist. Devlin helped Hazlett overcome the injury and the close relationship persuaded Hazlett to join Belfast Celtic in 1948. He described the transfer as "the best move I ever made", adding "I got good wages, a job and settled down quickly. Belfast was so like Glasgow." As well as being provided a day job by the club, he received wages of between £10–12 a week.

In his first season with Belfast Celtic, Hazlett played in a derby match against Linfield that ended in violence after Celtic scored a late equaliser in a match that saw two men sent off and two Linfield players taken off injured. At the end of the match, Celtic forward Jimmy Jones was attacked by opposition supporters, being pushed over a pitch side wall before being kicked so badly he suffered a broken leg. His teammates rushed to help him, with Hazlett receiving a punch to the face during the melee. The club folded at the end of the season with Hazlett featuring in its last ever league match, a 4–3 victory over Cliftonville on 21 April 1949. He was also part of the side that toured the United States in 1949, scoring in a 4–2 victory over Detroit Select at the University of Detroit Stadium, although he missed the side's 2–0 victory over the touring Scotland national team through injury. However, Hazlett's experience of Scottish football proved invaluable in assisting manager Elisha Scott to plan for the fixture. The tour was the last set of matches the club played before folding having resigned from the Irish League.

=== Football League ===
Hazlett joined Football League side Bury in June 1949 for a fee of £2,500. He made more than 100 appearances during a year spell with the club. In 1952, he played in a trial match for First Division side Cardiff City and impressed manager Cyril Spiers enough for him to complete a £5,000 transfer soon after. He made his debut for Cardiff in the second match of the 1952–53 season against Middlesbrough and scored in his home debut during his next appearance in a 4–0 victory over Sheffield Wednesday. Despite playing in 6 of the club's first 8 matches, he was dropped in favour of Mike Tiddy and made only one further league appearance. At the end of the season, he was released by the club having made seven league appearances.

He subsequently signed for Millwall where he played for five seasons, making over 100 appearances, before moving into non-league football with Guildford City.

== Later life ==
Hazlett met his wife Shirley while playing for Bury. The couple had two children, Lynne and John. After retiring from football, Hazlett lived in New Cross Road near his former club Millwall where he worked as a PE teacher and later as an education welfare officer for the Inner London Education Authority. He also became a qualified football coach after gaining his coaching badges from the Football Association and worked with local youth and senior teams into his 70s. In his later years, Hazlett discovered that he had been living with one of his kidneys functioning at only 15 per cent. He and his wife retired to Farnborough in Kent. He died on 22 December 2012 at the age of 89.
