= Stan Johns =

English footballer

Personal information
- Date of birth: 28 June 1924
- Place of birth: Liverpool, England
- Date of death: 1985 (aged 60–61)
- Position: Inside forward

Senior career*
Years	Team	Apps	(Gls)
- South Liverpool
1950–51	West Ham United	6	(2)
- * Club domestic league appearances and goals as of 04:31, 29 June 2013 (UTC)

Stan Johns (28 June 1924 – 1985 ) was an English footballer who played as an inside forward for South Liverpool and West Ham United.

== Playing career ==
Born in Liverpool, Johns came to the attention of local teams Liverpool and Everton but decided to join West Ham United in 1950. Johns scored in his first two games for West Ham, against Cardiff City and Blackburn Rovers, played only four more games, without scoring, and was not selected again.

He died in 1985.
