= Harry Parfitt =

Welsh footballer

Personal information
- Full name: Henry Edward Parfitt
- Date of birth: 26 September 1929
- Place of birth: Cardiff, Wales
- Date of death: 17 October 2012 (aged 83)
- Place of death: Newport, Wales
- Position: Full back

Senior career*
Years	Team	Apps	(Gls)
1949–1952	Cardiff City	0	(0)
1952–1954	Torquay United	58	(0)
1954–1955	Cardiff City	1	(0)
- Worcester City
- * Club domestic league appearances and goals

Henry Edward Parfitt (26 September 1929 — 17 October 2012) was a Welsh professional footballer who played as a full back.

== Career ==
Parfitt began his career with his hometown club Cardiff City, signing in 1949. However, he was unable to break into the first team and was allowed to join Torquay United, as part of an agreement between the clubs where Cardiff would send players deemed not ready for first team football at a higher level. In exchange, Cardiff received first refusal on any Torquay players.

Parfitt spent two seasons with Torquay, making over 50 appearances when Cardiff chose to resign him, offering £2500. However, Torquay's board of directors demanded double for his sale and Cardiff were forced into paying the £5000 fee but subsequently ended their partnership with the club. He returned to Cardiff but made only one appearance, in a match against Bolton Wanderers, before being released. He later played for Worcester City.
