= Marwood Marchant =

Welsh footballer

Personal information
- Full name: Marwood Godfrey Marchant
- Date of birth: 18 June 1922
- Place of birth: Milford Haven, Wales
- Date of death: 28 June 1972 (aged 50)
- Place of death: Pembroke Dock, Wales
- Position: Inside forward

Senior career*
Years	Team	Apps	(Gls)
- Milford United
1950–1951	Cardiff City	12	(3)
1951–1953	Torquay United	40	(19)
–	Pembroke Borough		
- * Club domestic league appearances and goals

Marwood Godfrey Marchant (18 June 1922 – 28 June 1972) was a Welsh professional footballer who scored 22 goals from 52 appearances in the Football League, playing as an inside forward for Cardiff City and Torquay United.

== Career ==
Marchant was playing non-league football for Milford United before signing for Cardiff City in 1950. He scored six goals during the 1950–51 season, including a brace and a single goal in 8–0 and 7–1 thrashings of Welsh league sides Barry Town and Bangor City in the opening rounds of the Welsh Cup and the only goal of the South Wales derby match against Swansea Town on 24 March 1951. However, he struggled to oust more established forwards such as Wilf Grant from the starting line-up.

Prior to the introduction of loan deals, Cardiff had a working relationship with Torquay United to transfer players needing Football League experience to the Devon-based club in exchange for first rights on any players Cardiff wished to sign from Torquay and, the following year, Marchant was sent to the Gulls. He spent two years at Plainmoor, averaging nearly a goal every other game but left the club in 1953 and returned to non-league football with Pembroke Borough.

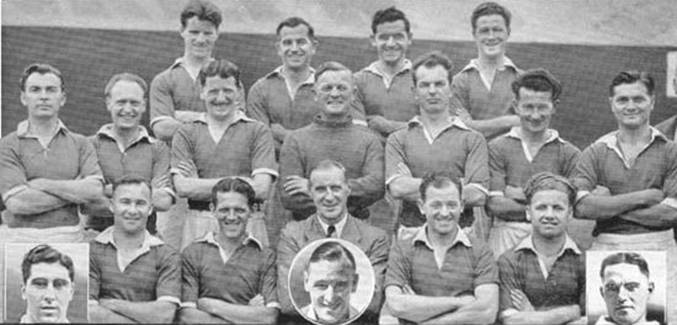
Marwood Marchant top row 2nd to left!
