= Charlie Hughes (footballer, born 1939) =

English footballer (born 1939)

Personal information
- Full name: Charles James Hughes
- Date of birth: 7 September 1939 (age 87)
- Place of birth: Blackpool, England
- Position: Goalkeeper

Youth career
- Wrexham

Senior career*
Years	Team	Apps	(Gls)
1958–1961	Wrexham	35	(0)
- Rhyl
- * Club domestic league appearances and goals

Charles James Hughes (born 7 September 1939) is an English former professional footballer who played as a goalkeeper. He made appearances in the English Football League with Wrexham. He also played for Rhyl.
