= Rees Thomas (footballer) =

Welsh footballer

Personal information
- Full name: Rees Thomas
- Date of birth: 3 January 1934
- Place of birth: Penywaun, Wales
- Date of death: 6 November 2017 (aged 83)
- Place of death: Trecynon, Aberdare
- Height: 5 ft 8 in (1.73 m)
- Position: Right back

Youth career
- Penywaun Royal Stars
- 1949–19??: Brighton & Hove Albion
- 19??–1951: Cardiff City

Senior career*
Years	Team	Apps	(Gls)
1951–1956	Cardiff City	0	(0)
1953	→ Torquay United (loan)	1	(0)
1956–1958	Brighton & Hove Albion	31	(1)
1958–1959	Bournemouth & Boscombe Athletic	48	(0)
1959–1961	Portsmouth	30	(0)
1961–1964	Aldershot	103	(2)
1964–19??	Hereford United		
- * Club domestic league appearances and goals

Rees Thomas (3 January 1934 – 6 November 2017) was a Welsh professional footballer who played as a right back in the Football League for Torquay United, Brighton & Hove Albion, Bournemouth & Boscombe Athletic, Portsmouth and Aldershot.

== Life and career ==
Thomas was born in 1934 in Penywaun and attended the Gadlys School in Aberdare. He captained the Wales schoolboys representative team. When he left school, he joined Brighton & Hove Albion, but soon returned to Wales where he signed for Cardiff City as a junior. He turned professional in January 1951, and remained with the club for five more years, but never played for their league team. For some of that time, he was engaged on National Service duties with the RAF, and he also spent a spell on loan at Torquay United, with whom he made his Football League debut in 1953.

In June 1956, Thomas rejoined Brighton & Hove Albion. He had a run in the league side in his first season, but lost his place to Des Tennant, and moved on to Bournemouth & Boscombe Athletic in January 1958. His performances for Bournemouth earned him a move to Portsmouth of the Second Division, but he played only 30 matches over two seasons, the second of which ended in relegation to the third tier and Thomas was released. His last league club was Aldershot of the Fourth Division, where he made 103 league appearances over three seasons. He then played for Southern League club Hereford United.

Thomas and his wife, Ann, had three children. After retiring from football, he and his family settled in the Aberdare area where he worked as a postman. He died in 2017 at the age of 83.
