= Phil McKnight =

Scottish footballer (1924–2018)

Personal information
- Full name: Philip McKnight
- Date of birth: 15 June 1924
- Place of birth: Camlachie, Scotland
- Date of death: 25 May 2018 (aged 93)
- Position: Wing half

Senior career*
Years	Team	Apps	(Gls)
1946–1947	Alloa Athletic	12	(1)
1947–1954	Chelsea	33	(1)
1954–1959	Leyton Orient	161	(2)
- * Club domestic league appearances and goals

Phil McKnight (15 June 1924 – 25 May 2018) was a Scottish footballer, who played for Alloa Athletic, Chelsea and Leyton Orient.
