= Norman Noble =

Scottish cricketer

Personal information
- Full name: Norman Doncaster Noble
- Born: 2 March 1881; Lucknow, North-Western Provinces, British India
- Died: 21 September 1955 (aged 74); Hartlip, Kent, England
- Batting: Unknown
- Bowling: Unknown

Domestic team information
- Years: Team
- 1922: Scotland

Career statistics
Competition	First-class
Matches	1
Runs scored	53
Batting average	26.50
100s/50s	–/–
Top score	38
Balls bowled	12
Wickets	0
Bowling average	–
5 wickets in innings	–
10 wickets in match	–
Best bowling	–
Catches/stumpings	2/–
- Source: ESPNcricinfo, 20 October 2022

Norman Doncaster Noble DSO (2 March 1881 — 21 September 1955) was a Scottish first-class cricketer and British Army officer.

The son of Colonel Charles Noble of the Bengal Staff Corps, he was born in Lucknow of British India in March 1881. He was educated in Scotland at the Edinburgh Academy, before going up to the Royal Military Academy, Woolwich. He graduated into the Royal Engineers as a second lieutenant in July 1899. He gained his first promotion to lieutenant in May 1902, later gaining promotion to captain in August 1908. Noble married Madeleine Arbuthnot at St Luke's Church in Chelsea in April 1912. He served in the First World War, during which he was decorated with the Distinguished Service Order in January 1916. He was promoted to major in April of the same year, with promotion to the temporary rank of lieutenant colonel following in March 1918, which he relinquished in October of the same year.

Noble was a keen club cricketer, who played in Scotland for Grange, having previously played regimental cricket for the Royal Engineers. Following the war, he made a single appearance in first-class cricket for Scotland against Ireland at Glasgow in 1922. Batting twice in the match, he was dismissed for 15 runs in the Scotland first innings by Lawrence Walker, while in their second innings he was dismissed for 38 runs by Gustavus Kelly, which was the highest score of the Scottish innings. His career in the Royal Engineers continued following the end of the war, with Noble gaining promotion to lieutenant colonel in January 1925. He was seconded to the Eastern Command of the British Indian Army in April 1925, an appointment which lasted until October 1928. He was promoted to colonel in April 1929. Having been placed on the half-pay list, Noble was appointed as the officer in command of the Record and Pay Office for the Royal Engineers in August 1930, later retiring in August 1934. He died in September 1955 in England at Hartlip, Kent.
