= Jack Shaw (footballer, born 1924) =

English footballer

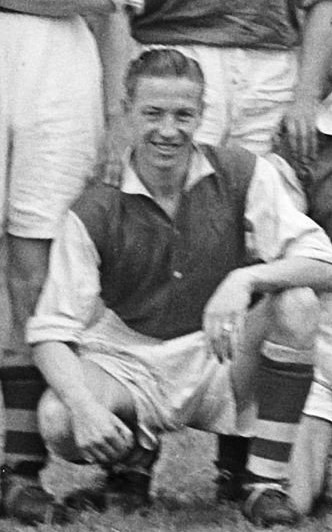
- Shaw in 1948

Personal information
- Full name: John Stephen Shaw
- Date of birth: 10 April 1924
- Place of birth: Doncaster, England
- Date of death: April 2011 (aged 87)
- Place of death: Denaby, England
- Position: Forward

Senior career*
Years	Team	Apps	(Gls)
- Yorkshire Main
1946–1953	Rotherham United	262	(122)
1953–1958	Sheffield Wednesday	56	(21)
- Denaby United
Total		318	(143)
- * Club domestic league appearances and goals

John Stephen Shaw (10 April 1924 – April 2011) was an English footballer who played in the Football League for Rotherham United and Sheffield Wednesday.
