= Graham Vearncombe =

Welsh footballer

Personal information
- Date of birth: 28 March 1934
- Place of birth: Cardiff, Wales
- Date of death: 30 November 1992 (aged 58)
- Position: Goalkeeper

Senior career*
Years	Team	Apps	(Gls)
1952–1964	Cardiff City	208	(0)
1964–????	Merthyr Tydfil		

International career
1957–1960	Wales	2	(0)
- * Club domestic league appearances and goals

Graham Vearncombe (28 March 1934 – 30 November 1992) was a Wales international footballer. A goalkeeper, he played his club football for Cardiff City and was part of the Wales squad for the 1958 FIFA World Cup in Sweden.

== Club career ==
Vearncombe was born in Cardiff. He made his professional debut for Cardiff City in the final match of the 1952–53 season during a 2–0 loss to Aston Villa. However, he made just 17 appearances during the next two years as he served as understudy to Ron Howells before becoming the club's first choice goalkeeper during the 1955–56 season. At the end of the season he won the first of his Welsh Cup winners medals after beating Swansea Town 3–2 in the final.

During the 1957–58 he shared the number one goalkeeper spot with Ken Jones before losing his place the following season to Ron Howells, making just one league appearance on the final day of the season but did play in all but one of the sides games in Welsh Cup, beating Lovells Athletic 2–0 in the final. He would later regain his spot as number one goalkeeper before leaving the club in 1964, his last appearance in a 2–0 win over Bangor City to win his third Welsh Cup winners medal. He later went on to play for non-league side Merthyr Tydfil.

== Honours ==
Cardiff City

- Football League Second Division runners-up: 1959–60
- Welsh Cup winners: 1955–56, 1958–59, 1963–64
- Welsh Cup runners-up: 1959–60
