= Peter Thomas (footballer, born 1932) =

Welsh footballer (born 1932)

Personal information
- Full name: Peter John Thomas
- Date of birth: 18 October 1932 (age 94)
- Place of birth: Treforest, Wales
- Position: Winger

Senior career*
Years	Team	Apps	(Gls)
1953–1954	Cardiff City	4	(1)
1954–1956	Exeter City	29	(4)
1956–1958	Newport County	6	(1)
- Bath City
Total		39	(6)
- * Club domestic league appearances and goals

Peter John Thomas (born 18 October 1932) is a Welsh footballer who played in the Football League for Cardiff City, Exeter City and Newport County. In January 2025, he celebrated his 70th wedding anniversary.
