= Bill Heath (footballer) =

English footballer

Personal information
- Full name: William Henry Mansell Heath
- Date of birth: 15 April 1934 (age 92)
- Place of birth: Boscombe, Hampshire, England
- Position: Goalkeeper

Youth career
- –: Bournemouth & Boscombe Athletic

Senior career*
Years	Team	Apps	(Gls)
1956–1958	Bournemouth & Boscombe Athletic	34	(0)
1958–1962	Lincoln City	84	(0)
1962–19??	Cambridge City		
–	Newmarket Town		

Managerial career
- –: Newmarket Town (player-manager)
- * Club domestic league appearances and goals

William Henry Mansell Heath (born 15 April 1934) is an English former footballer who made 118 appearances in the Football League playing as a goalkeeper for Bournemouth & Boscombe Athletic and Lincoln City. He moved into non-league football with Cambridge City, with whom he won the Southern League title in 1962–63, and later became player-manager of Newmarket Town.
