= Joe Dunn (footballer) =

Scottish footballer and manager (1925–2005)

Personal information
- Full name: Joseph Dunn
- Date of birth: 20 September 1925
- Place of birth: Glasgow, Scotland
- Date of death: December 2005 (aged 80)
- Place of death: Lancashire, England
- Position: Central defender

Youth career
- Springburn United

Senior career*
Years	Team	Apps	(Gls)
1948–1951	Clyde	29	(0)
1951–1961	Preston North End	223	(2)
1961–1964	Morecambe		
Total		252	(2)

Managerial career
- 1961–1964: Morecambe
- * Club domestic league appearances and goals

Joseph Dunn (20 September 1925 – December 2005) was a Scottish football player and manager.
