= Ken Branagan =

English footballer

Personal information
- Full name: Kenneth Branagan
- Date of birth: 27 July 1930
- Date of death: 9 August 2008 (aged 78)
- Place of death: Salford, England
- Position: Full back

Senior career*
Years	Team	Apps	(Gls)
1950–1959	Manchester City F.C	197	(3)
1959–1966	Oldham Athletic	176	(5)
- * Club domestic league appearances and goals

Kenneth Branagan (27 July 1930 – 9 August 2008) was an English football fullback who was born in Salford. He played for Manchester City F.C. between 1950 and 1959, appearing 197 times and scoring three goals before being transferred to Oldham Athletic A.F.C. Ken and wife Maureen had seven children, 3 sons and 4 daughters. Ken died on the night of Saturday 9 August 2008 at the age of 78 after a long battle with Alzheimer's disease.
