= Ray Iggleden =

English footballer (1925–2003)

Personal information
- Full name: Horatio Iggleden
- Date of birth: 17 March 1925
- Place of birth: Kingston upon Hull, England
- Date of death: 21 December 2003 (aged 78)
- Place of death: Kingston upon Hull, England
- Height: 5 ft 7 in (1.70 m)
- Position: Inside forward

Senior career*
Years	Team	Apps	(Gls)
1946–1948	Leicester City	11	(2)
1948–1955	Leeds United	169	(47)
1955–1956	Exeter City	27	(8)
1956–1958	Goole Town		
1958–19??	Barton Town		
Total		207+	(57+)
- * Club domestic league appearances and goals

Horatio "Ray" Iggleden (17 March 1925 – 17 December 2003) was an English footballer who played as an inside forward for Leicester City, Leeds United and Exeter City. He appeared over 100 times for Leeds and was their top scorer for one season.

== Career ==
Iggleden was born in Kingston upon Hull on 17 March 1925. He attended Constable Street School in Hull, and played for Hull City Boys regularly, and for the Yorkshire Boys team in 1938.

He played wartime football for Leicester City in 1941, and in 1942 agreed professional terms to sign for the club. He went to serve in the Royal Marines however, and was part of their football team that toured Holland in 1945, before returning to play for Leicester in February 1946. Having made 11 appearances for the club, in which he scored two goals, Iggleden handed in a transfer request to Leicester City in late 1948, but turned down an offer from Southend United to avoid moving to the South.

In December 1948, Iggleden transferred to Leeds United as part of a player swap deal with Ken Chisholm. He played 16 league matches for Leeds in the 1948–49 season, but was transfer listed at his own request in September 1949, and again in September 1950. The early months of the 1951–52 season saw Iggleden hit form for Leeds, which carried through to the end of the season as he finished the season as Leeds' top goalscorer. He underwent a nose operation in summer 1952. He remained a key player until the 1954–55 season where he was diaplaced by Bobby Forrest, and ended up scoring 50 goals from 181 games in total for Leeds.

He transferred to Exeter City in July 1955. He was Exeter's joint top goalscorer in the 1955–56 season with 10 goals in all competitions, though Exeter left him open to transfer at the end of the season. He signed for Midland League club Goole Town in August 1956, and in August 1958 he moved on to Barton Town of the Lincolnshire Football League.
