= Keith Thomas (English footballer) =

English footballer (1929–2021)

Personal information
- Full name: Walter Keith Thomas
- Date of birth: 28 July 1929
- Place of birth: Oswestry, England
- Date of death: 5 October 2021 (aged 92)
- Place of death: Shrewsbury, England
- Position: Right winger

Youth career
- –1950: Oswestry Town

Senior career*
Years	Team	Apps	(Gls)
1950–1952	Sheffield Wednesday	10	(1)
1952–1953	Cardiff City	9	(4)
1953–1956	Plymouth Argyle	35	(8)
1956–1957	Exeter City	43	(6)
Total		97	(19)
- * Club domestic league appearances and goals

Walter Keith Thomas (28 July 1929 – 5 October 2021) was an English footballer who played as a right winger.

== Career ==
Born in Oswestry, Thomas played for the town's local club prior to signing for Sheffield Wednesday in 1950. A schoolteacher by profession, he rejoined Oswestry Town as player-manager in 1957 and, in 1959, joined Welsh side Pwllheli in the same position.

During the 1950s, Thomas made 97 appearances in the Football League for Sheffield Wednesday, Cardiff City, Plymouth Argyle and Exeter City.

Thomas was also an avid golf player, being latterly member of Condover Golf Club.

== Personal life ==
Thomas had served in the army as a fitness instructor in the UK and abroad and reached the rank of Captain before starting a schoolteaching career.

Thomas died on 5 October 2021, at the age of 92. His funeral took place on 25 October 2021 at Emstrey Crematorium, Shrewsbury. He was survived by his second wife, Barbel, to whom he had been married 40 years, and daughter Jane; a son, Andrew, predeceased him.
