= Griff Norman =

Welsh footballer

Personal information
- Full name: Albert Griffith Norman
- Date of birth: 20 February 1926
- Place of birth: Cardiff, Wales
- Date of death: 6 August 2010 (aged 84)
- Place of death: Cardiff, Wales
- Position: Wing half

Senior career*
Years	Team	Apps	(Gls)
1950–1952	Cardiff City	1	(0)
1952–1958	Torquay United	216	(6)
- * Club domestic league appearances and goals

Albert Griffith Norman (20 February 1926 — 6 August 2010) was a Welsh professional footballer who played as a wing half. He played in the Football League for Cardiff City and Torquay United.

== Career ==
Norman began his career with his hometown club Cardiff City, making his professional debut in a 1–1 draw with Southampton in September 1951. However, it proved to be his only appearance for the club and, as part of a regular player exchange deal between the clubs, he was allowed to join Torquay United in 1952. He quickly established himself in the first team and went on to make over 200 appearances.
