= Dennis Callan =

Welsh footballer

Personal information
- Full name: Dennis Callan
- Date of birth: 27 July 1932
- Place of birth: Merthyr Tydfil, Wales
- Date of death: 2006 (aged 73–74)
- Place of death: Merthyr Tydfil, Wales
- Position: Wing half

Senior career*
Years	Team	Apps	(Gls)
- Troedyrhiw
1952–1955	Cardiff City	1	(0)
1954–1955	→ Exeter City (loan)	10	(1)
- * Club domestic league appearances and goals

Dennis Callan (27 July 1932 — October 2006) was a Welsh professional footballer who played as a wing half.

== Career ==
Born in Merthyr Tydfil, Callan began playing for local side Troedyrhiw before signing for Cardiff City in 1952. He made his debut for Cardiff during the 1955–56 season in a 2–1 defeat to Huddersfield Town. He also spent time on loan with Exeter City before returning to non-league football.
