= Doug Blair (footballer) =

English footballer

Personal information
- Full name: Douglas Blair
- Date of birth: 26 June 1921
- Place of birth: Ecclesfield, Sheffield, England
- Date of death: July 1998 (aged 77)
- Place of death: Wiltshire, England
- Position: Inside forward

Senior career*
Years	Team	Apps	(Gls)
1939–1940	Blackpool	0	(0)
1947–1954	Cardiff City	204	(30)
1954–1957	Hereford United	?	(?)
- * Club domestic league appearances and goals

Douglas Blair (26 June 1921 – July 1998) was an English professional footballer. He began his career at Blackpool but never featured in a Football League match for the club following the outbreak of the Second World War. On his return to football in 1947, he joined Cardiff City and went on to make over 200 appearances for the club.

== Personal life ==
Born in Ecclesfield, Sheffield, Blair was the son of Scottish international Jimmy Blair Sr. and brother of Jimmy Blair Jr.

== Career ==
Blair started out at Blackpool, signing for the club in May 1939. However the outbreak of the Second World War soon after meant he never featured for the club in the Football League. He played in wartime fixtures for the club during the 1939–40 season but was conscripted and left the club. While undergoing his army training, Blair featured in eight wartime fixtures for Aldershot, scoring four times. He later played in one fixture for Leeds United on 25 August 1945 against Chesterfield.

Following the return of league football, Blair joined Cardiff City, where his father Jimmy had played during the 1920s, in August 1947. He became a vital part of the Bluebirds side in the following years and helped them to win promotion to the First Division during the 1951–52 season. Blair scored thirty goals during his career at Cardiff, all scored in league competition. He left Ninian Park in 1954 to sign for Hereford United where he finished his career. He made 113 appearances for Hereford and scored 31 goals for the Edgar Street club.
