= Colin Gale =

Welsh footballer

Personal information
- Full name: Colin Maurice Gale
- Date of birth: 31 August 1932
- Place of birth: Pontypridd, Wales
- Date of death: 27 October 2008 (aged 76)
- Place of death: Rhydyfelin, Wales
- Position: Defender

Senior career*
Years	Team	Apps	(Gls)
1950–1956	Cardiff City	12	(0)
1956–1961	Northampton Town	211	(0)
Total		223	(0)
- * Club domestic league appearances and goals

Colin Maurice Gale (31 August 1932 – 27 October 2008) was a Welsh professional footballer who made over 200 appearances in The Football League between 1950 and 1961.

== Career ==
A centre half, Gale began his career with Cardiff City in 1950 but was forced to wait until January 1954 before making his debut for the club in a 3–0 win over Manchester City as a right back. Unable to hold down a regular first team spot, Gale made the last of his 13 appearances in all competitions for the club during a 9–1 defeat to Wolverhampton Wanderers in September 1955 before leaving to join Third Division South side Northampton Town in March 1956, as part of a deal involving teammate Roley Williams.

He quickly established himself in the Northampton first team, going on to make over 200 appearances for the club and was part of the side that gained promotion to Division Three in the 1960–61 season. He decided to leave the club at the end of the season in order to secure more job security for his family, moving to Wisbech.

== After retirement ==
Gale later moved to Australia, before returning to Wales where he ran a hotel. He died on 27 October 2008 at the age of 76.
