= Elfed Evans =

Welsh footballer

Personal information
- Full name: Elfed Ellison Evans
- Date of birth: 28 August 1926
- Place of birth: Ferndale, Wales
- Date of death: 13 May 1988 (aged 61)
- Place of death: Burton upon Trent, England
- Position: Forward

Senior career*
Years	Team	Apps	(Gls)
1949–1952	Cardiff City	46	(18)
1951	→ Torquay United (loan)	12	(6)
1952–1955	West Bromwich Albion	17	(3)
1955–1956	Wrexham	34	(16)
1956–1957	Southport	13	(0)
- Caernarfon Town
- Burton Albion
- * Club domestic league appearances and goals

Elfed Ellison Evans (28 August 1926 – 13 May 1988) was a Welsh professional footballer.

== Career ==
Evans, an inside-forward, joined Cardiff City in May 1949 from Treharris, having previously played for Trelewis and Glamorgan side Nelson. He made his league debut the following season in a 1–1 draw with Sheffield Wednesday and, even though he played in less than half of the club's matches that season, he finished as the team's top scorer. He joined Torquay United on loan in March 1951, scoring six goals in twelve league games. He returned to Cardiff, playing one more season to finish his Ninian Park career with 18 goals in 46 games.

In June 1952 he moved to West Bromwich Albion for a fee of £5,000 and played 17 times the following season. However, he did not appear in Albion's league side for the next two seasons and in June 1955 joined Wrexham for £1,250. In December 1956 he moved on again, after scoring 16 times in 34 league games for the Robins, joining Southport for £600. He played 13 games for Southport without scoring to finish his league career. He subsequently played for non-league sides Caernarfon Town and Burton Albion.

Elfed Evans died in May 1988 aged 61.
