= Herbert Merrett =

Welsh Industrialist (1886-1959)

Sir Herbert Henry Merrett (1886 – 3 October 1959) was a Welsh industrialist. In his teens he won a reputation as a footballer and played for the Cardiff Corinthians, a prestigious amateur soccer team, and he subsequently qualified as a referee. He was appointed chairman of the Cardiff City Association Football Club in 1939 and with one short break, and despite his business involvement, he remained chairman until 1957.

== Career ==
Herbert Merrett grew up and was educated in Cardiff. He began his career in the Cardiff Docks with Cory Brothers, initially a junior, though he later became the company's general chairman and director when it merged with Powell Duffryn Ltd in 1947 as a result of nationalisation. Merrett was a director of Powell Duffryn from 1940, having previously been director of Blaenclydach Colliery (c.1923-1937), Troedyrhiw Coal (c.1923-1933) Company and D.R. Llewellyn & Sons (c. 1923-1933) and chairman of Graigola Merthyr Company (c.1923-1933). His other positions include chairman and managing director of Crynant Colliery (c.1933-1940) and director of North's Navigation Collieries (c.1940-1950). By 1930, he also was managing director of his own company, Gueret, Llewellyn & Merrett Ltd.

In 1932, Merrett published a book entitled I fight for coal, describing his early experiences in the Welsh coal industry. Herbert was Justice of the Peace for Glamorganshire and High Sheriff 1934-35. In 1935-36, he served as president of Cardiff Incorporated Chamber of Commerce. He later became president of the British Coal Exporters' Federation 1946-49. In the 1950 King's Birthday Honours List he was knighted and in that same year received an award from France of Chevalier de la Légion d'Honneur, having established associations within Europe.

== Sports ==
Merrett was an avid footballer in his youth and played for the amateur team the Cardiff Corinthians. He became a qualified referee and was chairman of the Cardiff City Association Football Club 1939-1957, barring one short break. He was also president of the Glamorgan County Cricket Club.

== Personal life ==
Merrett was born in Canton parish, Cardiff on 18 December 1886, the son of Lewis and Elizabeth Merrett. In 1911, he married Marion Linda Higgins who bore him two daughters and a son. Merrett's grandson is Alan Chalmers, who ran security at Wimbledon for 40 years.

Merrett died on 3 October 1959 at home in Dinas Powys

== Bibliography ==
- Colliery Year Book and Coal Trades Directory, published by The Louis Cassier Co. Ltd., 1923-1955
- The Colliery Guardian and Journal of the Coal and Iron Trades: - 1 November 1935, University of Michigan, (page 838) - 8 November 1935 (page 887) - 20 November 1942 (page 625)
- The Science & Art of Mining: - 25 April 1936, Page: 327 - 2 March 1935, Page: 264 - 18 April 1931, Page: 305 - 16 April 1932, Page: 316 - 25 June 1932, Page: 388 - 18 February 1933, Page: 241 - 10 June 1933, Page: 376 - 25 November 1933, Page: 152 - 14 April 1934, Page: 305 - 23 June 1934, Page: 389 - 24 November 1934, Page: 152; Thos. Wall and Sons Ltd., ASIN: B00IJFP0IA
- I Fight for Coal by H. H. Merrett, ASIN: B00086OLZ6
