= Roley Williams =

Welsh footballer (1927–1999)

Personal information
- Full name: Donald Roland Williams
- Date of birth: 10 July 1927
- Place of birth: Swansea, Wales
- Date of death: 30 June 1999 (aged 71)
- Place of death: Newport, Wales
- Position: Winger

Senior career*
Years	Team	Apps	(Gls)
????–1949	Milford United		
1949–1956	Cardiff City	138	(19)
1956–1957	Northampton Town	15	(0)
1957–????	Bath City		
- Lovells Athletic
- * Club domestic league appearances and goals

Donald Roland Williams (10 July 1927 – 30 June 1999) was a Welsh professional footballer.

Williams was playing Welsh league football for Milford United when he was spotted by Cardiff City manager Cyril Spiers. A number of clubs were interested at the time, including his home town club Swansea Town, but he signed a contract with Cardiff in February 1949. Despite suffering numerous small injuries during his seven years at the club, he quickly became a regular in the side providing numerous chances for the club's prolific striker Wilf Grant to score 26 goals during the 1951–52 season. His injuries meant he never played a full season for the club and in 1956 he was allowed to leave and join Northampton Town. His spell at the club was brief and he moved into non-league football with Bath City and Lovells Athletic before retiring.
