= Cliff Nugent =

English footballer (1929–2018)

Personal information
- Full name: William Clifford Nugent
- Date of birth: 3 March 1929
- Place of birth: Islington, England
- Date of death: 17 February 2018 (aged 88)
- Place of death: Weymouth, Dorset, England
- Position: Winger

Senior career*
Years	Team	Apps	(Gls)
?–1951	Headington United		
1951–1958	Cardiff City	113	(19)
1958–1960	Mansfield Town	52	(7)
1960–?	Weymouth		
- * Club domestic league appearances and goals

William Clifford Nugent (3 March 1929 – 17 February 2018) was an English professional footballer.

Nugent was playing non-league football for Headington United when Cardiff City manager Cyril Spiers spotted him and brought him to Ninian Park in January 1951. He did not make his debut for the club until the following season, in a 1–0 win over Hull City, but he eventually managed to force his way into the side during the 1953–54 season. He scored his first goal for Cardiff in a match against Wolverhampton Wanderers in January 1954. He helped the club avoid relegation on the final day of the season in the next season but injury ruled him out for all but one game during the 1955-56 campaign, making an incredible return the next year by scoring a hattrick during a 7–0 thrashing of Barnsley.

Nugent left the club in November 1958 and signed for Mansfield Town where he spent two years before moving into non-league football with Weymouth.

Nugent died in Weymouth, Dorset on 17 February 2018, at the age of 88.
