= Glyn Williams (footballer) =

Welsh footballer

Personal information
- Full name: Glyndwr James John Williams
- Date of birth: 3 November 1918
- Place of birth: Maesteg, Wales
- Date of death: 6 May 2011 (aged 92)
- Position: Defender

Senior career*
Years	Team	Apps	(Gls)
1946–1952	Cardiff City	144	(0)

International career
1951	Wales	1	(0)
- * Club domestic league appearances and goals

Glyndwr James John Williams (3 November 1918 – 6 May 2011) was a Welsh professional footballer.

== Career ==
Born in Maesteg, Williams began his career playing for Caerau as an amateur, helping them win the Welsh Amateur Cup in 1946 and, despite only having played a handful of games, following the return of the English Football League after World War II he signed for Cardiff City. He made his debut in January 1947 in a 1–0 win over Aldershot, during a season in which Cardiff gained promotion to Division Two. His versatility, being able to play anywhere in defence, saw him become a regular for the side and at the end of the 1950–51 season his form lead to his first and only Wales cap when he played against Switzerland. However, at the end of the following season, he was released by the club and returned to non-league Welsh football.
