= Stan Montgomery =

English footballer and cricketer

Personal information
- Full name: Stanley William Montgomery
- Date of birth: 7 July 1920
- Place of birth: Silvertown, England
- Date of death: 5 October 2000 (aged 80)
- Place of death: Cardiff, Wales
- Position: Defender

Senior career*
Years	Team	Apps	(Gls)
?–1946	Romford	?	(?)
1946	Hull City	5	(0)
1946–1948	Southend United	96	(7)
1948–1955	Cardiff City	231	(4)
1955	Worcester City	?	(?)
1955–1956	Newport County	9	(0)
1956–?	Llanelli	?	(?)
?–?	Ton Pentre	?	(?)
- * Club domestic league appearances and goals

Stanley William Montgomery (7 July 1920 – 5 October 2000) was an English professional footballer and first-class cricketer. He was the son-in-law of 1927 FA Cup winner Jimmy Nelson, who also played over 200 times for Cardiff City.

== Football career ==
Montgomery began his football career playing for non-league Romford during World War II, also guesting on several occasions for Southend United. Following the end of the war he signed for Hull City, but only spent a short period there before returning to play at Southend. He remained at the club until 1948 when he joined Cardiff City for a fee of £6,000, on the recommendation of his father-in-law Jimmy Nelson who had played for Cardiff in the 1920s.

He made a goalscoring debut for Cardiff against Grimsby Town in January 1949 and played the remaining seventeen matches of the season. He missed very few games for the Blubirds over the next seven years and helped them to promotion during the 1951/52 season. He eventually left the club in 1955 and returned to non-league football with Worcester City before finishing is career in Wales with spells at Newport County, Llanelli and Ton Pentre. After his retirement he became a coach and was appointed by George Swindin (then manager of Norwich City) as the Canaries' first team coach in 1962. Swindin tok over at Cardiff five months later and Montgomery followed him to Ninian Park, again to work as first team coach for the next two years. He subsequently worked as Sports Adviser to the Boys Clubs of Wales, and helped Bristol Rovers as a scout in the South Wales area, later having a spell as Rovers' Youth team coach. He later returned to Ninian Park on the request of manager Alan Durban to take charge of the clubs trialists.

== Cricket career ==
Montgomery was also a first-class cricketer with Glamorgan from 1949 to 1953. He joined Glamorgan from Barry Athletic Club and made his first-class debut against Derbyshire at the Arms Park in 1949. He made his highest first-class score of 117, his maiden century, against Hampshire later that season, sharing a fifth-wicket stand of 264 with Maurice Robinson (190). This is still the fifth-wicket record partnership for Glamorgan.
