= Ken Hollyman =

Welsh footballer

Personal information
- Full name: Kenneth Charles Hollyman
- Date of birth: 18 November 1922
- Place of birth: Cardiff, Wales
- Date of death: 14 May 2009 (aged 86)
- Place of death: Cardiff, Wales
- Position: Defender

Senior career*
Years	Team	Apps	(Gls)
?–1939	Cardiff Nomads		
1939–1953	Cardiff City	188	(8)
1953–1960	Newport County	231	(4)
- * Club domestic league appearances and goals

Kenneth Charles Hollyman (18 November 1922 – 14 May 2009) was a Welsh professional footballer.

== Career ==
Hollyman began his career playing for Cardiff Nomads before joining Cardiff City in 1939. He played in more than eighty wartime matches, serving with the Fleet Air Arm during the war, for the club before eventually making his league debut against Norwich City on the opening day of the 1946–47 season, the first season of league football following the end of World War II. He missed very few games in the next few years, including being ever-present during the 1950–51 season, before being allowed to leave in 1953 to join Newport County.

In the 1958–59 FA Cup Newport County faced Tottenham Hotspur in the fourth round. The game was played in heavy snow away at White Hart Lane, and although County lost 4–1 their goal came from a 35-yard effort by Hollyman. This made the scoreline 1–2, giving County the hope that they could force an upset upon Bill Nicholson's men (who were double winners a year later). However, two late goals for Tottenham ended County's hopes of pulling off a shock result.

Hollyman spent seven years with Newport County at Somerton Park before leaving to become player-coach at Ton Pentre.

Hollyman died in Cardiff on 14 May 2009 at the age of 86.

== Honours ==
Cardiff City

- Division Three South Winner: 1

1946–47

- Division Two Runner-up: 1

1951–52

- Welsh Cup Finalist: 1

1951–52
