= Bobby McLaughlin =

Northern Ireland footballer

Personal information
- Full name: Robert McLaughlin
- Date of birth: 6 December 1925
- Place of birth: Belfast, Northern Ireland
- Date of death: 25 April 2003 (aged 77)
- Place of death: Southampton, England
- Height: 5 ft 3 in (1.60 m)
- Position: Wing half

Senior career*
Years	Team	Apps	(Gls)
- Distillery
1950	Wrexham	17	(0)
1950–1953	Cardiff City	48	(3)
1953–1959	Southampton	169	(5)
- Headington United
- Yeovil Town
- Salisbury City
Total		234	(8)
- * Club domestic league appearances and goals

Robert McLaughlin (6 December 1925 – 25 April 2003) was a Northern Irish professional footballer who played as a wing half.

== Career ==
Born in Belfast, McLaughlin played for Distillery, Wrexham, Cardiff City, Southampton, Headington United, Yeovil Town and Salisbury City.
