= Charles Rutter =

English footballer

Personal information
- Full name: Charles Frederick Rutter
- Date of birth: 22 December 1927
- Place of birth: Bromley, England
- Date of death: 19 October 2012 (aged 84)
- Place of death: Cardiff, Wales
- Position: Defender

Senior career*
Years	Team	Apps	(Gls)
?–1949	Taunton Town		
1949–1958	Cardiff City	118	(0)

International career
1952	England B	1	(0)
- * Club domestic league appearances and goals

Charles Frederick Rutter (22 December 1927 – 19 October 2012) was an English professional footballer.

Born in Bromley, Rutter was playing non-league football for Taunton Town when he was spotted by Cardiff City who offered him a full contract with the club. He made his debut in a 0–0 draw with Doncaster Rovers in 1950. His performances in the 1951–52 season earned him a call-up for the England B team. Towards the end of that season he sustained a serious knee injury in a match against Notts County which kept him out for the whole of the following season. On his return he found his place in the squad taken by Ron Stitfall and, although he stayed at the club until 1958, he struggled to break into the side again. He returned to non-league football after leaving Cardiff, including briefly managing Kent club Sittingbourne.

After his retirement from football, Rutter set up his own tropical bird business in Cardiff's central market.
