= Ken Oakley =

Welsh footballer (1929–2017)

Personal information
- Full name: Kenneth Oakley
- Date of birth: 9 May 1929
- Place of birth: Rhymney, Wales
- Date of death: March 2017 (aged 87)
- Place of death: Monmouthshire, Wales
- Position: Forward

Youth career
- Rhymney Boys
- Abertysswg Boys

Senior career*
Years	Team	Apps	(Gls)
1950–1951	Cardiff City	5	(1)
1951–1953	Ebbw Vale		
1953–1954	Cardiff City	2	(0)
1954–1955	Northampton Town	13	(6)
1955–1965	Ebbw Vale		
- * Club domestic league appearances and goals

Kenneth Oakley (9 May 1929 – March 2017) was a Welsh professional footballer who played as a forward. He played in the Football League for Cardiff City and Northampton Town.

== Early life and education ==
Born in Rhymney, Oakley was raised in Butetown. He attended Bargoed Technical School but left school at the age of 14 to take up a job in a factory in Dowlais.

== Career ==
Oakley began playing football at the age of 14 for Rhymney Boys before joining Abertysswg Boys two years later. He was selected for the Wales under-18 side twice, playing in matches against England and Scotland. He was spotted by Cardiff City at the age of 18 and signed for the club in 1950, being paid £7 a week during the season. He played in the opening five matches of the 1950–51 season, scoring once, before losing his place in the side.

At the end of the season, Oakley was called up to complete his national service. Given the option of working as a miner or joining the armed forces, he chose to join the Royal Air Force where he was a storeman. During his service, he played for Welsh league side Ebbw Vale. He returned to Cardiff in 1953, making two further league appearances before joining Northampton Town. He returned to Ebbw Vale in 1955 where he played for over ten years, retiring at the age of 35 after suffering a cracked femur.
