= Billy Baker (footballer, born 1920) =

Welsh footballer

Personal information
- Full name: William George Baker
- Date of birth: 3 October 1920
- Place of birth: Penrhiwceiber, Wales
- Date of death: 6 February 2005 (aged 84)
- Height: 5 ft 8 in (1.73 m)
- Position: Wing half

Senior career*
Years	Team	Apps	(Gls)
1938–1955	Cardiff City	292	(5)
1955–1956	Ipswich Town	20	(0)

International career
1948	Wales	1	(0)
- * Club domestic league appearances and goals

William George Baker (3 October 1920 – 6 February 2005) was a Welsh professional footballer. He made over 300 appearances for Cardiff City in a spell disrupted by the outbreak of World War II, winning one cap for Wales in 1948.

== Career ==
Born in Penrhiwceiber, Baker began his career Troedrhiw before joining Cardiff City in January 1938, after having trials at a number of clubs including Arsenal and Wolverhampton Wanderers. He made his debut for the club in a 2–0 win over Northampton Town in February 1939 as an outside-right but would make just two more appearances before the outbreak of World War II. Baker had played in 22 wartime fixtures for the club when he was called up to enlist.

Baker joined the 77th HAA Regiment, which contained a number of footballers including other Cardiff City players Ernie Curtis and Billy James and embarked on a journey to North Africa by ship for deployment. However, en route, Japanese forces launched an attack on Pearl Harbor, leading the UK to declare war against Japan which saw Baker and his unit rerouted to Java where British forces suffered heavy losses and Baker was one of numerous British troops taken prisoner. He spent four years as a Prisoner of war.

On the return of The Football League in 1946, Baker was converted into a wing half. The presence of Ron Burgess in his position at national level restricted Baker's appearances for Wales, winning a single cap in 1948 in a 2–0 defeat to Northern Ireland when Burgess was unavailable for selection after being chosen to play for his club in an FA Cup semi-final. He spent nine post-war years at Cardiff before leaving in 1955, having been displaced following the arrival of Colin Baker. He transferred to Ipswich Town, where he ended his playing days. After leaving Ipswich, he returned to Cardiff, where he became an ambulance driver, remaining a well recognised figure to older fans, and continued playing amateur football until 1959 for Ton Pentre in the Welsh Football League.

== Honours ==
Cardiff City

- Football League Third Division South Winner: 1946–47
- Welsh Cup Runner-up: 1950–51
- Football League Second Division Runner-up: 1951–52
