= George Edwards (Welsh footballer) =

Welsh footballer

Personal information
- Full name: George Edwards
- Date of birth: 2 December 1920
- Place of birth: Treherbert, Wales
- Date of death: 21 October 2008 (aged 87)
- Place of death: Cardiff, Wales
- Position: Outside left

Senior career*
Years	Team	Apps	(Gls)
1938–1939	Swansea Town	2	(0)
1944–1948	Birmingham City	84	(9)
1948–1955	Cardiff City	194	(34)

International career
1946–1949	Wales	12	(2)
- * Club domestic league appearances and goals

George Edwards (2 December 1920 – 21 October 2008) was a Welsh international footballer. After making his Football League debut for Swansea Town, his career was interrupted by the outbreak of the Second World War. He turned professional with Birmingham City in 1944 before joining Cardiff City four years later.

He represented Wales at international level, winning twelve caps.

== Football career ==
=== Club career ===
Born in Treherbert, Edwards began his football career at Swansea Town as an amateur and made his debut in the Football League at the end of the 1938–39 season. During the early years of the Second World War, he continued to study for a degree at Swansea University while still playing for Swansea Town. Called up to serve in the RAF, he was stationed in the Midlands, and guested for Coventry City on a number of occasions.

He turned professional with Birmingham City in 1944, contributing to the club winning the championship of the Football League South wartime league and reaching the semi-final of the FA Cup in the 1945–46 season, and winning the Second Division title in the 1947–48 season.

In December 1948 he returned to Wales to sign for Cardiff City for £12,000. He made his debut in a 2–2 draw with Leicester City before scoring on his home debut in a 6–1 victory over Bradford Park Avenue. He helped the Bluebirds to promotion as Second Division runners-up in the 1951–52 season and began forming a partnership with striker Wilf Grant. He decided to retire in 1955 while still first choice for Cardiff.

=== International career ===
Edwards first represented his country as an amateur in 1938, and played for Wales in wartime internationals and for Services representative sides. He made his debut for Wales in their first post-war international match, a 3–1 victory over Scotland in October 1946, and won a total of twelve full caps during his career, scoring two goals.

== Outside football ==
Edwards continued his studies while a Birmingham player, completing a thesis on the history of the 'Daucleddau Coalfield', a major part of the Pembrokeshire Coalfield, to gain an MA degree from the University of Birmingham. In his later years as a Cardiff City player, he began a business career, working part-time for an oil company. In 1957 he was invited to join the board of directors of Cardiff City, a directorship which he held for twenty-five years in two spells. He wrote a Sunday newspaper column, reported on Cardiff City matches for the BBC, and was a magistrate in Cardiff for many years. He was active on the Sports Council for Wales (now Sport Wales) from its establishment in 1972, and within the Football Association of Wales.

Edwards was married to Pat, and had no children. He died in Llandough Hospital, Cardiff, on 21 October 2008 at the age of 87.
