= Ron Howells =

Welsh footballer

Personal information
- Full name: Ronald Gilbert Howells
- Date of birth: 12 January 1927
- Place of birth: Ponthenri, Wales
- Date of death: 29 December 2011 (aged 84)
- Position: Goalkeeper

Senior career*
Years	Team	Apps	(Gls)
1946–1948	Swansea Town	9	(0)
1948–1950	Barry Town		
1950–1957	Cardiff City	155	(0)
1957–1958	Worcester City		
1958–1960	Chester	80	(0)
1960–19??	Barry Town		

International career
1953	Wales	2	(0)
- * Club domestic league appearances and goals

Ronald Gilbert Howells (12 January 1927 – 29 December 2011) was a Welsh professional footballer who played as a goalkeeper. He was capped by Wales and played in The Football League for three clubs.

== Playing career ==
Howells began his playing career with Swansea Town, joining the club in September 1946. He overcame a broken wrist to make his debut for the club in a 1–1 draw with Walsall in February 1948. He made nine appearances for the club during the 1947–48 season in the Football League Third Division South. However, he dropped out of The Football League and played for Barry Town before resurrecting his professional career with Cardiff City in July 1950.

Due to the presence of Iorwerth Hughes, he was forced to wait until 26 December 1951 to make his debut in a 3–0 win over his former club Swansea Town. After winning promotion in his second season at Ninian Park, Howells was to spend five years playing in the First Division. This period also saw him win two caps for the Welsh national side in the 1954 World Cup qualifiers against England and Scotland.

Howells dropped back into non-league football with Worcester City but revived his league career with Chester in September 1958. He was a regular in his two seasons at Sealand Road, but was released at the end of 1959–60. Howells had continued to live in South Wales throughout his spell at Chester, who were reluctant to continue paying his expenses.

This marked the end of his professional career and he joined Barry Town.

== After retirement ==
After retiring from football, Howells later became a painter and decorator in his hometown Ponthenry.

== Career Honours ==
Cardiff City

- Division Two runners-up: 1951–52
