= Wilf Grant =

English footballer and manager (1920-1990)

Personal information
- Full name: Wilfred Grant
- Date of birth: 3 August 1920
- Place of birth: Bedlington, England
- Date of death: 17 July 1990 (aged 69)
- Place of death: Worcester, England
- Height: 5 ft 7 in (1.70 m)
- Positions: Winger; centre forward

Youth career
- Morpeth Town
- 1937–1939: Newcastle United

Senior career*
Years	Team	Apps	(Gls)
1943–1946	Manchester City	0	(0)
1946–1950	Southampton	61	(11)
1950–1954	Cardiff City	155	(65)
1954–1957	Ipswich Town	75	(22)
1957–1958	Llanelli		

International career
1952	England 'B'	1	(0)

Managerial career
- 1957–1958: Llanelli
- 1971–1972: Worcester City
- 1974–1975: Bromsgrove Rovers
- * Club domestic league appearances and goals

Wilfred Grant (3 August 1920 – 17 July 1990) was an English professional footballer who played as a forward for Southampton, Cardiff City and Ipswich Town.

== Playing career ==
=== Early career ===
Grant was born in Bedlington and as a youth played for Morpeth Town before joining Newcastle United as a trainee in 1937. His career was interrupted by the Second World War when he joined the Royal Air Force. Towards the end of the war he signed professional papers with Manchester City, but continued with the RAF. Whilst stationed at Wareham he guested for Southampton; as he had a brother working for Southern Railway at Eastleigh he was keen to remain in Hampshire and after the cessation of hostilities Southampton bought him out of his Manchester City contract for £1,000.

=== Southampton ===
He made his debut for the "Saints" in a Second Division game away to West Bromwich Albion on 5 October 1946 on the left wing, where he soon became settled, scoring a brace in a 5–1 victory over Plymouth Argyle on 26 October. Manager Bill Dodgin preferred him on the right, however, (where he replaced Billy Bevis), teaming up with the ageing Bill Rochford. This role was not to Grant's liking and his form slumped. Although he was transfer-listed in August 1948, he remained with Southampton for the next two seasons, used occasionally as replacement for Eric Day. In 1948–49 he seemed settled back on the left before he lost his place to Bill Heaton. After a rather frustrating time, he joined Cardiff City in March 1950 with Ernie Stevenson coming to the south coast in exchange. In his four seasons at The Dell he made 64 appearances scoring 13 goals.

=== Cardiff City ===
Soon after his move to Ninian Park, manager Cyril Spiers moved him to centre forward following the arrival of Mike Tiddy, where his devastating turn of speed immediately produced instant rewards, with 14 goals coming in the 1950–51 season as Cardiff finished in third place in the Second Division. The following season Cardiff went one better finishing in second place, thus gaining promotion to the First Division. During Cardiff's promotion season Grant was top scorer with 26 goals, the first 19 of which were at home. Shortly after Cardiff secured their place in the top flight, Grant's superb form earned him a call up to the England 'B' team for a match against their French equivalents on 22 May 1952. Unfortunately for Grant the match ended in a resounding 7–1 victory for the French which brought his international career to an end.

He spent two further seasons with Cardiff in the First Division where, jointly with Ken Chisholm, he was again top scorer in 1953–54 with 12 goals as Cardiff reached tenth place in the league table. After four and a half seasons at Cardiff City, Grant was sold to Ipswich Town in October 1954 for a fee of £7,500. In his career at Cardiff, Grant made a total of 159 league and FA Cup appearances scoring 67 goals.

=== Ipswich Town ===
At Ipswich he was manager Scott Duncan's most expensive signing at £7,500. At the end of Grant's first season at Portman Road, Ipswich were relegated to the Third Division South. In August 1955 Duncan resigned and was replaced as manager by Grant's former Southampton teammate, Alf Ramsey. In 1955–56 Grant contributed 16 goals (including two hat-tricks against Millwall) as Town finished in third place, missing promotion by one point. Injuries and loss of form restricted Grant to 12 appearances in 1956–57 (at the end of which Ipswich were promoted as Champions). After three years with Ipswich, Grant (now 37) dropped out of the Football League to join Llanelli as player-manager.

== Coaching and management ==
After a year with Llanelli, during which his "astute management" helped them gain promotion to the Welsh Football League First Division, Grant returned to Cardiff City where he spent four years as a coach, helping them back to the First Division in 1960. He was sacked during the 1962–63 season after a row with the board.

He then spent some time as a scout for Bristol Rovers before being appointed as manager at Southern League Premier Division Worcester City in December 1971. After a year at Worcester he was replaced by Graham Newton. His final managerial position was at Bromsgrove Rovers (of the Southern League Division One North) who he joined in December 1974, but was sacked nine months later.

== After football ==
He subsequently became a sports teacher at a Worcester college. He died in Worcester on 17 July 1990 shortly before his 70th birthday.

== Honours ==
Cardiff City

- Football League Second Division runners-up: 1951–52
