= Mike Tiddy =

English footballer (1929–2009)

- Tiddy in 1958

Personal information
- Full name: Michael Douglas Tiddy
- Date of birth: 4 April 1929
- Place of birth: Cadgwith, England
- Date of death: 25 November 2009 (aged 80)
- Place of death: Truro, England
- Position: Winger

Senior career*
| Years | Team | Apps | (Gls) |
| 1946–1950 | Torquay United | 5 | (0) |
| 1950–1955 | Cardiff City | 145 | (19) |
| 1955–1958 | Arsenal | 48 | (8) |
| 1958–1962 | Brighton & Hove Albion | 133 | (11) |
| 1962–1964 | Penzance | | |
| 1964–1965 | Helston Athletic | | |
| 1965–1969 | Falmouth Town | 84 | (37) |
| 1969–? | Porthleven | | |

Managerial career
- 1962–1964: Penzance
- * Club domestic league appearances and goals

Michael Douglas Tiddy (4 April 1929 – 25 November 2009) was an English professional football player and manager.

== Career ==
Born in Cadgwith, Cornwall, Tiddy, the older of two footballing brothers joined Torquay United at the end of World War II but was forced to wait two years to play for the club while he finished his National Service. He left Torquay in November 1950 to sign for Cardiff City and he became a virtual ever-present in the Cardiff line-up for the next five years, and was one of the club's most popular players during the 1950s before moving to Arsenal in 1955 along with Gordon Nutt in exchange for Brian Walsh.

Tiddy made his debut against Sunderland on 24 September 1955 but most of his time in London was spent in the treatment room as he suffered from numerous injuries, which forced him to undergo a cartilage operation. By the time he was fully fit, in 1957-58, he had to share the left wing position with Joe Haverty and Gordon Nutt, only playing 12 matches. Having played fifty-two games and scoring eight goals for Arsenal in three seasons, he was allowed to join Brighton & Hove Albion in October 1958. He was appointed player-manager of Penzance at the age of 33, later becoming player-manager of Helston Athletic and a player for Falmouth Town. Well into his fifties, Tiddy finished his career at his home village club Lizard Argyle.

== After football ==
Following his retirement, Tiddy returned to live in Cornwall with his wife Christine, becoming a sub-postmaster and later a local preacher on The Lizard peninsula. He also previously served as chairman of the Landewednack parish council.

Tiddy died on 25 November 2009 at the age of 80 at the Royal Cornwall Hospital.
