= Cyril Spiers =

English footballer and manager

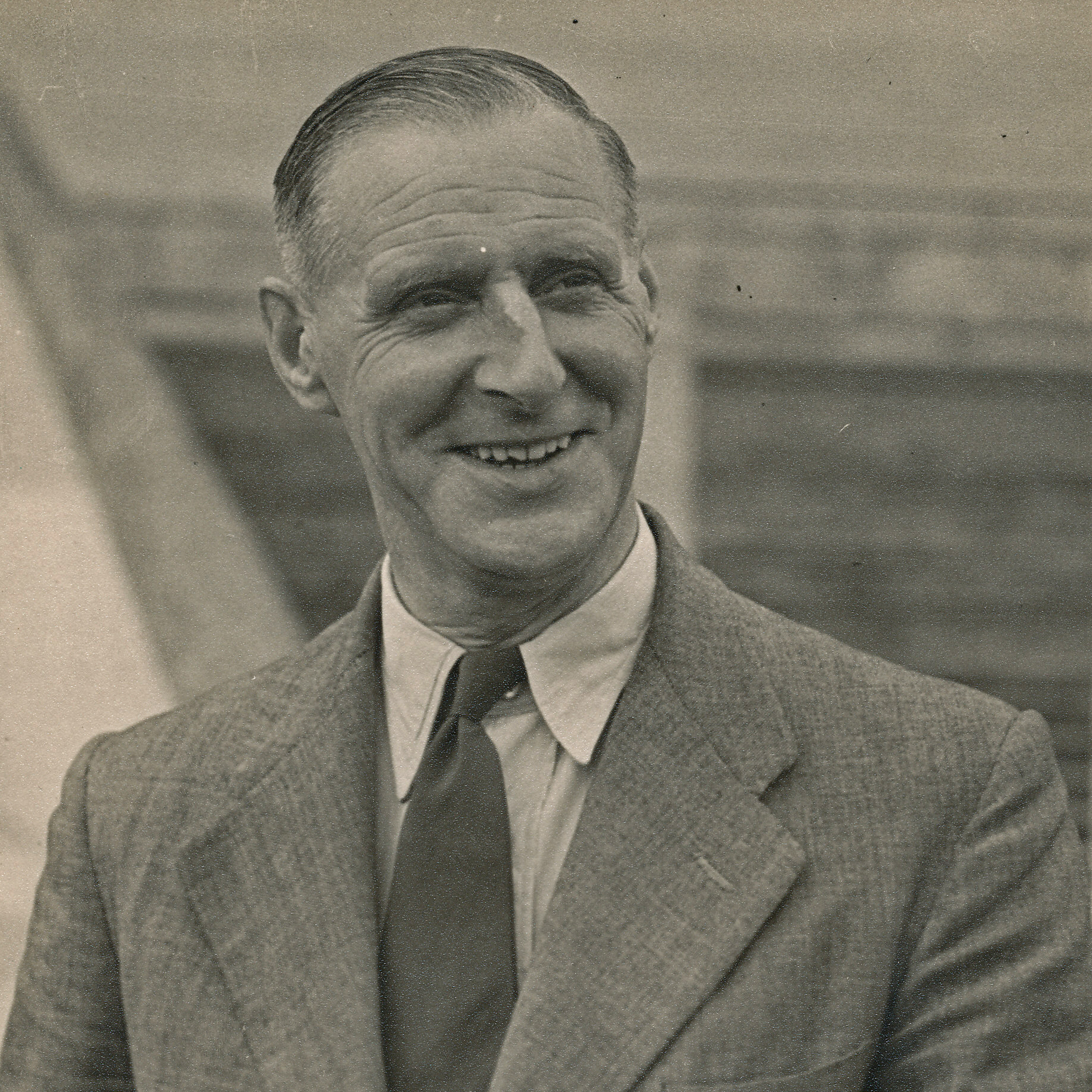

Personal information
- Full name: Cyril Henry Spiers
- Date of birth: 4 April 1902
- Place of birth: Witton, England
- Date of death: 21 May 1967 (aged 65)
- Height: 6 ft 0 in (1.83 m)
- Position: Goalkeeper

Youth career
- ?–1920: Halesowen Town

Senior career*
Years	Team	Apps	(Gls)
1920–1927	Aston Villa	104	(0)
1927–1933	Tottenham Hotspur	169	(0)
1933–1939	Wolverhampton Wanderers	8	(0)

Managerial career
- 1939–1946: Cardiff City
- 1946–1947: Norwich City
- 1947–1954: Cardiff City
- 1954–1958: Crystal Palace
- 1962–1963: Exeter City
- * Club domestic league appearances and goals

Cyril Henry Spiers (4 April 1902 – 21 May 1967) was an English football goalkeeper who played for Aston Villa, Tottenham Hotspur and Wolverhampton Wanderers. He later went on to manage at Football League clubs for more than twenty years.

== Playing career ==
Spiers began his playing career at Halesowen Town during World War I and signed for Aston Villa in 1920, where he made 104 League and 8 FA Cup appearances over a seven-year career, competing with Tommy Jackson for a regular place. He made his debut on Christmas Day 1920, in a 4–3 defeat to Manchester United. He was forced to retire after suffering a serious injury and, believing that he could never play again, Aston Villa released him. However, he underwent experimental surgery and was able to return to football with Tottenham Hotspur, making 169 appearances between 1927 and 1932. Spiers was ever present in seasons 1929–30 and 1930–31 but missed the entire 1932–33 season through injury. He eventually left the club and became player-coach, and subsequently, assistant manager, to Frank Buckley at Wolverhampton Wanderers. He made eight appearances for "Wolves".

== Managerial career ==
In 1939 he took over as secretary-manager at Cardiff City but his rebuilding of the team was cut short following the outbreak of World War II. He stayed at the club throughout the war and set up a number of nursery teams, including Cardiff Nomads who would go on to bring local football talent, including Alan Harrington and Colin Baker, to the club. He fell into dispute with the club over money and left to manage Norwich City in June 1946. He was back at Cardiff in December 1947 as manager to replace Billy McCandless, bringing the Cardiff Nomads back with him having adopted the club for Norwich when he joined. He took them to promotion during the 1951–52 season but eventually left to manage Crystal Palace in September 1954. He later had a spell scouting for Leicester City before taking his last managerial post at Exeter City in 1962.

Spiers died on 21 May 1967 aged 65.

== Managerial statistics ==
Managerial record by team and tenure
Team	Nat	From	To	Record				
Team	Nat	From	To	G	W	D	L	Win %
Cardiff City	(Wales)	April 1939	April 1946	10	3	3	4	30
Norwich City	(England)	June 1946	December 1947	64	15	12	37	23.44
Cardiff City	(Wales)	April 1948	April 1954	265	107	73	85	40.38
Crystal Palace	(England)	September 1954	June 1958	183	52	54	77	28.42
Exeter City	(England)	May 1962	February 1963	28	7	4	17	25
Total				550	184	146	220	33.45
