= 1948–49 Cardiff City F.C. season =

Welsh football club season

Cardiff City
1948–49 season
- Chairman: (Wales) Sir Herbert Merrett
- Manager: (England) Cyril Spiers
- Division Two: 4th
- FA Cup: 5th round
- Welsh Cup: Semi Final
- Top goalscorer: League: Ernie Stevenson (12); All: Ernie Stevenson (13)
- Highest home attendance: 56,018 v Tottenham Hotspur 9 October 1948
- Lowest home attendance: 26,441 v Coventry City 23 April 1949
- Average home league attendance: 35,091
Home colours

The 1948–49 season was Cardiff City F.C.'s 22nd season in the Football League. They competed in the 22-team Division Two, then the second tier of English football, finishing fourth.

== Season review ==
=== Football League Second Division ===
==== Partial league table ====
Pos	Team	Pld	W	D	L	GF	GA	GAv	Pts	Qualification or relegation
2	West Bromwich Albion (P)	42	24	8	10	69	39	1.769	56	Promotion to the First Division
3	Southampton	42	23	9	10	69	36	1.917	55	
4	Cardiff City	42	19	13	10	62	47	1.319	51	
5	Tottenham Hotspur	42	17	16	9	72	44	1.636	50	
6	Chesterfield	42	15	17	10	51	45	1.133	47	

Rules for classification: 1) Points; 2) Goal average; 3) Goals scored
(P) Promoted

=== Results by round ===
Round	1	2	3	4	5	6	7	8	9	10	11	12	13	14	15	16	17	18	19	20	21	22	23	24	25	26	27	28	29	30	31	32	33	34	35	36	37	38	39	40	41	42
Ground	A	H	H	A	A	A	H	H	A	H	A	H	A	A	H	A	H	A	H	A	H	A	H	A	H	A	H	A	H	A	H	A	H	A	H	H	A	A	H	H	A	H
Result	L	D	W	L	D	D	W	W	D	W	W	L	L	L	L	D	D	W	W	D	W	D	W	L	L	D	W	L	W	W	W	W	D	W	W	W	L	D	W	W	D	D
Position			14	17	17	17	13	4	7	5	4	6	9	13	17	17	16	13	11	10	7	7	6	8	9	9	8	10	7	7	5	5	5	5	4	4	4	5	4	4	4	4
Points	0	1	3	3	4	5	7	9	10	12	14	14	14	14	14	15	16	18	20	21	23	24	26	26	26	27	29	29	31	33	35	37	38	40	42	44	44	45	47	49	50	51

A = Away; H = Home; W = Win; D = Draw; L = Loss

== Players ==
First team squad.

Note: Flags indicate national team as defined under FIFA eligibility rules; some limited exceptions apply. Players may hold more than one non-FIFA nationality.

No.	Pos.	Nation	Player
--	GK	ENG	Phil Joslin
--	GK	WAL	Ted Morris
--	DF	WAL	Ken Hollyman
--	DF	WAL	Arthur Lever
--	DF	SCO	Harry May
--	DF	ENG	Stan Montgomery
--	DF	ENG	Alf Rowland
--	DF	WAL	Alf Sherwood
--	DF	WAL	Fred Stansfield
--	DF	WAL	Albert Stitfall
--	DF	WAL	Ron Stitfall
--	DF	WAL	Derrick Sullivan
--	DF	WAL	Glyn Williams
--	MF	WAL	Billy Baker

No.	Pos.	Nation	Player
--	MF	WAL	Roley Williams
--	FW	WAL	Bryn Allen
--	FW	ENG	Tommy Best
--	FW	ENG	Doug Blair
--	FW	WAL	George Edwards
--	FW	WAL	Ted Gorin
--	FW	ENG	Bill Hullett
--	FW	WAL	Beriah Moore
--	FW	WAL	Gordon Pembery
--	FW	WAL	Cecil Price
--	FW	WAL	Billy Rees
--	FW	ENG	Ernie Stevenson
--	FW	ENG	George Wardle

== Fixtures and results ==
=== Second Division ===
21 August 1948 1	Bradford (Park Avenue)	3–0	Cardiff City	Bradford
15:15	Johnny Downie; Johnny Downie; George Ainsley			Stadium: Park Avenue (stadium); Attendance: 15,048; Referee: SE Law (West Bromwich)

23 August 1948 2	Cardiff City	3–3	Luton Town	Cardiff
18:15	Ken Hollyman (90s); Bill Hullett 23'; Beriah Moore 75'	Luton report	8' Ted Duggan; Sammy Nelson; Billy Arnison	Stadium: Ninian Park; Attendance: 35,687; Referee: JM Wiltshire (Dorset)

28 August 1948 3	Cardiff City	2–1	Southampton	Cardiff
15:15	Bill Hullett 22', 86'		27' Charlie Wayman	Stadium: Ninian Park; Attendance: 37,189; Referee: RC Carter (Swindon)

30 August 1948 4	Luton Town	3–0	Cardiff City	Luton
18:30	Billy Arnison 7', 43', 76'	Luton report		Stadium: Kenilworth Road; Attendance: 20,185; Referee: JM Wiltshire (Sherbourne, Dorset)

4 September 1948 5	Barnsley	1–1	Cardiff City	Barnsley
	George Robledo		Derrick Sullivan	Stadium: Oakwell; Attendance: 18,542

9 September 1948 6	Queens Park Rangers	0–0	Cardiff City	London
18:00				Stadium: Loftus Road; Attendance: 25,337; Referee: Fred Green (Wolverhampton)

11 September 1948 7	Cardiff City	3–0	Grimsby Town	Cardiff
15:15	Ken Hollyman; Billy Rees; Ken Moody (o.g.)			Stadium: Ninian Park; Attendance: 32,156; Referee: HC Williams (Fulham)

13 September 1948 8	Cardiff City	3–0	Queens Park Rangers	Cardiff
17:45	Billy Rees; Billy Rees; Bill Hullett			Stadium: Ninian Park; Attendance: 36,223; Referee: Fred Green (Wolverhampton)

18 September 1948 9	Nottingham Forest	0–0	Cardiff City	Nottingham
		Forest report		Stadium: City Ground; Attendance: 20,417; Referee: L Brown (Surrey)

25 September 1948 10	Cardiff City	2–1	Fulham	Cardiff
15:15	Bill Hullett; Bill Hullett		Jack McDonald	Stadium: Ninian Park; Attendance: 38,423; Referee: RL Aldridge (Birmingham)

2 October 1948 11	Plymouth Argyle	0–1	Cardiff City	Plymouth
15:15			Ken Hollyman	Stadium: Home Park; Attendance: 27,371; Referee: LG Webb (Midsomer Norton)

9 October 1948 12	Cardiff City	0–1	Tottenham Hotspur	Cardiff
15:15			Ernie Jones	Stadium: Ninian Park; Attendance: 56,018; Referee: A Ward (Bristol)

16 October 1948 13	West Ham United	3–1	Cardiff City	London
15:00	Eddie Chapman; Eric Parsons; Ken Wright		(pen.) Arthur Lever	Stadium: Upton Park; Attendance: 29,433

30 October 1948 14	West Bromwich Albion	2–0	Cardiff City	West Bromwich
15:00	Jack Haines; Cyril Williams			Stadium: The Hawthorns; Attendance: 46,036; Referee: NC Taylor (Westbury)

6 November 1948 15	Cardiff City	3–4	Chesterfield	Cardiff
15:00	Billy Rees; Doug Blair; Fred Stansfield		Dave Blakey; Dave Blakey; Chris Marron (o.g.) Fred Stansfield	Stadium: Ninian Park; Attendance: 36,359; Referee: FC Green (Wolverhampton)

13 November 1948 16	Lincoln City	0–0	Cardiff City	Lincoln
14:45				Stadium: Sincil Bank; Attendance: 14,438; Referee: Harry Hartley (Bolton)

20 November 1948 17	Cardiff City	1–1	Sheffield Wednesday	Cardiff
14:30	Ernie Stevenson		Eddie Quigley	Stadium: Ninian Park; Attendance: 30,084

27 November 1948 18	Coventry City	0–1	Cardiff City	Coventry
			Ernie Stevenson	Stadium: Highfield Road; Attendance: 22,121

4 December 1948 19	Cardiff City	2–1	Leeds United	Cardiff
14:30	Bryn Allen 42'; Ernie Stevenson 50'		7' Len Browning	Stadium: Ninian Park; Attendance: 31,972

11 December 1948 20	Leicester City	2–2	Cardiff City	Leicester
	Jack Lee; Don Revie (pen.)		8' Billy Rees; 18' Ted Gorin	Stadium: Filbert Street; Attendance: 24,343; Referee: George Clark (London)

18 December 1948 21	Cardiff City	6–1	Bradford (Park Avenue)	Cardiff
14:30	George Edwards; Bryn Allen; Ernie Stevenson; Ernie Stevenson; Arthur Lever (pen.); Ken Hollyman		Johnny Downie	Stadium: Ninian Park; Attendance: 28,002; Referee: SE Law (West Bromwich)

25 December 1948 22	Brentford	1–1	Cardiff City	London
	Fred Monk		Bryn Allen	Stadium: Griffin Park; Attendance: 22,813

27 December 1948 23	Cardiff City	2–0	Brentford	Cardiff
14:15	Bryn Allen; Ernie Stevenson			Stadium: Ninian Park; Attendance: 49,236; Referee: Lewis Webb (Bath)

1 January 1949 24	Southampton	2–0	Cardiff City	Southampton
14:15	Augie Scott; Charlie Wayman			Stadium: The Dell; Attendance: 20,937; Referee: EV Crook

15 January 1949 25	Cardiff City	0–3	Barnsley	Cardiff
14:45			Fred Richardson; John Kelly; George Robledo	Stadium: Ninian Park; Attendance: 29,116; Referee: Alfred Tolley (Worcester)

22 January 1949 26	Grimsby Town	2–2	Cardiff City	Grimsby
14:40	Billy Cairns; Jimmy Whitfield		Billy Rees; Stan Montgomery	Stadium: Blundell Park; Attendance: 15,210

5 February 1949 27	Cardiff City	1–0	Nottingham Forest	Cardiff
15:15	Billy Rees 26'	Forest report		Stadium: Ninian Park; Attendance: 31,522; Referee: L Brown (Surrey)

19 February 1949 28	Fulham	4–0	Cardiff City	London
15:15	Bob Thomas; Bob Thomas; Bedford Jezzard; Arthur Stevens (pen.)			Stadium: Craven Cottage; Attendance: 40,795; Referee: RL Aldridge

26 February 1949 29	Cardiff City	1–0	Plymouth Argyle	Cardiff
15:15	Ken Hollyman			Stadium: Ninian Park; Attendance: 29,006; Referee: Lewis Webb (Bath)

5 March 1949 30	Tottenham Hotspur	0–1	Cardiff City	London
			Ken Hollyman	Stadium: White Hart Lane; Attendance: 51,183

12 March 1949 31	Cardiff City	4–0	West Ham United	Cardiff
15:15	Ken Hollyman; Ernie Stevenson; Ernie Stevenson; Tommy Best			Stadium: Ninian Park; Attendance: 28,271

19 March 1949 32	Bury	0–3	Cardiff City	Bury
15:00			Doug Blair; Tommy Best; George Edwards	Stadium: Gigg Lane; Attendance: 15,836

26 March 1949 33	Cardiff City	2–2	West Bromwich Albion	Cardiff
15:15	Doug Blair; Tommy Best		Jack Haines; Davy Walsh	Stadium: Ninian Park; Attendance: 47,649; Referee: Norman Taylor (Westbury)

2 April 1949 34	Chesterfield	0–2	Cardiff City	Chesterfield
15:15			Tommy Best; George Edwards	Stadium: Saltergate; Attendance: 14,299

4 April 1949 35	Cardiff City	2–1	Bury	Cardiff
18:00	Doug Blair; Tommy Best		Dave Massart	Stadium: Ninian Park; Attendance: 34,161

9 April 1949 36	Cardiff City	3–1	Lincoln City	Cardiff
15:15	Ernie Stevenson 6', 9'; George Edwards 77'		85' Laurie Smedley	Stadium: Ninian Park; Attendance: 32,585; Referee: Harry Hartley (Bolton)

15 April 1949 37	Blackburn Rovers	2–1	Cardiff City	Blackburn
	Dennis Westcott; Eddie Crossan		George Edwards	Stadium: Ewood Park; Attendance: 23,468

16 April 1949 38	Sheffield Wednesday	1–1	Cardiff City	Sheffield
15:00	Eddie Quigley		Tommy Best	Stadium: Hillsborough; Attendance: 32,297; Referee: SE Law (West Bromwich)

18 April 1949 39	Cardiff City	1–0	Blackburn Rovers	Cardiff
15:15	Arthur Lever 15'			Stadium: Ninian Park; Attendance: 33,325; Referee: L Brown (Surrey)

23 April 1949 40	Cardiff City	3–0	Coventry City	Cardiff
15:15	George Edwards 63'; Ernie Stevenson 35', 78'			Stadium: Ninian Park; Attendance: 26,441; Referee: WJ Edwards (Yeovil)

30 April 1949 41	Leeds United	0–0	Cardiff City	Leeds
				Stadium: Elland Road; Attendance: 19,945; Referee: H Key

7 May 1949 42	Cardiff City	1–1	Leicester City	Cardiff
15:15	Billy Baker		Jack Lee	Stadium: Ninian Park; Attendance: 33,496; Referee: George Clark (London)

=== FA Cup ===
8 January 1949 Round 3	Oldham Athletic	2–3	Cardiff City	Oldham
	Ray Haddington; Eric Gemmell		Ken Hollyman; Ken Hollyman; Bryn Allen	Stadium: Boundary Park; Attendance: 28,991; Referee: Reg Leafe (Nottingham)

29 January 1949 Round 4	Aston Villa	1–2	Cardiff City	Aston Villa
14:30	Dicky Dorsett 29'		72' Ken Hollyman; 84' Billy Rees	Stadium: Villa Park; Attendance: 70,718; Referee: Tom Seymour (Wakefield)

12 February 1949 Round 5	Derby County	2–1	Cardiff City	Derby
	Doug Taft 9'; Reg Harrison 16'		88' Ernie Stevenson	Stadium: Baseball Ground; Attendance: 35,746; Referee: Bill Dellow (Croydon)

=== Welsh Cup ===
12 January 1949 Round 6	Cardiff City	3–1	Troedyrhiw	Cardiff
	Ted Gorin; George Wardle; Tommy Best		Goal	Stadium: Ninian Park; Attendance: 500

3 March 1949 Round 7	Milford	2–1	Cardiff City	Milford Haven
	Goal		Alf Rowland; George Edwards	Attendance: 7,500

7 April 1949 Semi Final	Merthyr Tydfil	1–3	Cardiff City	Swansea
17:30	Goal		Ernie Stevenson	Stadium: Vetch Field; Attendance: 22,000; Referee: CN Gregory (Swansea)

== See also ==
- List of Cardiff City F.C. seasons
