= 1947–48 Cardiff City F.C. season =

Welsh football club season

Cardiff City
1947–48 season
- Chairman: (Wales) Sir Herbert Merrett
- Manager: (Republic of Ireland) Billy McCandless (resigned November 1947) (England) Cyril Spiers (from 3 December 1947)
- Division Two: 5th
- FA Cup: 3rd round
- Welsh Cup: 6th round
- Top goalscorer: League: Billy Rees (11); All: Billy Rees (12)
- Highest home attendance: 49,209 v Newcastle United 10 April 1948
- Lowest home attendance: 26,179 v West Bromwich Albion 24 April 1948
- Average home league attendance: 37,871
Home colours

The 1947–48 season was Cardiff City F.C.'s 21st season in the Football League. They competed in the 22-team Division Two, then the second tier of English football, finishing fifth.

== Season review ==
=== Football League Second Division ===
==== Partial league table ====
Pos	Team	Pld	W	D	L	GF	GA	GAv	Pts
3	Southampton	42	21	10	11	71	53	1.340	52
4	Sheffield Wednesday	42	20	11	11	66	53	1.245	51
5	Cardiff City	42	18	11	13	61	58	1.052	47
6	West Ham United	42	16	14	12	55	53	1.038	46
7	West Bromwich Albion	42	18	9	15	63	58	1.086	45

Rules for classification: 1) Points; 2) Goal average; 3) Goals scored

=== Results by round ===
Round	1	2	3	4	5	6	7	8	9	10	11	12	13	14	15	16	17	18	19	20	21	22	23	24	25	26	27	28	29	30	31	32	33	34	35	36	37	38	39	40	41	42
Ground	H	H	A	A	H	H	A	A	H	H	A	H	A	A	H	A	H	A	H	A	H	A	H	A	H	A	H	A	A	H	A	H	H	A	H	H	A	A	H	A	H	A
Result	D	W	W	D	L	W	L	D	W	W	W	W	D	L	D	L	D	L	W	W	W	D	D	W	W	L	W	L	W	W	D	W	W	L	L	D	L	L	D	L	L	W
Position			3	3	9	3	8	7	5	4	4	3	3	4	4	6	7	7	7	5	4	4	6	3	3	3	3	3	2	2	2	2	2	2	3	3	3	4	4	5	5	5
Points	1	3	5	6	6	8	8	9	11	13	15	17	18	18	19	19	20	20	22	24	26	27	28	30	32	32	34	34	36	38	39	41	43	43	43	44	44	44	45	45	45	47

A = Away; H = Home; W = Win; D = Draw; L = Loss

== Players ==
First team squad. Note: Flags indicate national team as defined under FIFA eligibility rules; some limited exceptions apply. Players may hold more than one non-FIFA nationality.

No.	Pos.	Nation	Player
--	GK	WAL	Roger Ashton
--	GK	WAL	Danny Canning
--	DF	WAL	Ken Hollyman
--	DF	WAL	Arthur Lever
--	DF	WAL	Alf Sherwood
--	DF	WAL	Fred Stansfield
--	DF	WAL	Ron Stitfall
--	DF	WAL	Derrick Sullivan
--	DF	WAL	Glyn Williams
--	MF	WAL	Billy Baker
--	FW	WAL	Bryn Allen

No.	Pos.	Nation	Player
--	FW	ENG	Doug Blair
--	FW	ENG	Colin Gibson
--	FW	ENG	Bill Hullett
--	FW	WAL	Billy Lewis
--	FW	NIR	Seamus McBennett
--	FW	WAL	Beriah Moore
--	FW	WAL	Billy Rees
--	FW	WAL	Stan Richards
--	FW	WAL	Bernard Ross
--	FW	ENG	George Wardle

== Fixtures and results ==
=== Second Division ===
23 August 1947 1	Cardiff City	0–0	Chesterfield	Cardiff
15:15				Stadium: Ninian Park; Attendance: 38,028

25 August 1947 2	Cardiff City	3–0	Doncaster Rovers	Cardiff
18:15	Stan Richards 41'; George Wardle 61', 68'			Stadium: Ninian Park; Attendance: 44,415; Referee: FS Milner (Wolverhampton)

30 August 1947 3	Millwall	0–1	Cardiff City	London
			45' George Wardle	Stadium: The Den; Attendance: 28,703

4 September 1947 4	Doncaster Rovers	2–2	Cardiff City	Doncaster
	Jack Kirkaldie; Jack Thompson		George Wardle; Doug Blair	Stadium: Belle Vue; Attendance: 27,760; Referee: FS Milber (Wolverhampton)

6 September 1947 5	Cardiff City	0–3	Tottenham Hotspur	Cardiff
15:15			Les Bennett; Len Duquemin; Len Duquemin	Stadium: Ninian Park; Attendance: 48,894; Referee: FW Wort

8 September 1947 6	Cardiff City	5–1	Southampton	Cardiff
18:15	Eric Webber (o.g.); Billy Rees; Beriah Moore; Beriah Moore; Stan Richards		Eric Day	Stadium: Ninian Park; Attendance: 39,363

13 September 1947 7	Sheffield Wednesday	2–1	Cardiff City	Sheffield
15:00	Dennis Woodhead; Doug Witcomb		Billy Rees	Stadium: Hillsborough; Attendance: 36,489; Referee: Arthur Blythe (London)

17 September 1947 8	Southampton	2–2	Cardiff City	Southampton
17:30	Jack Bradley; Eric Day		Seamus MacBennett; Seamus MacBennett	Stadium: The Dell; Attendance: 16,495; Referee: Cliff Wakley (Somerton)

20 September 1947 9	Cardiff City	3–0	Plymouth Argyle	Cardiff
15:15	Doug Blair; Arthur Lever; Billy Rees	Plymouth report		Stadium: Ninian Park; Attendance: 33,060; Referee: RG Haines (Swindon)

27 September 1947 10	Cardiff City	1–0	Bradford (Park Avenue)	Cardiff
15:15	Billy Rees 82'			Stadium: Ninian Park; Attendance: 39,796; Referee: S McCarthy (Wrexham)

4 October 1947 11	Nottingham Forest	1–2	Cardiff City	Nottingham
	Wilson Jones 58' (pen.)		1', 40' Colin Gibson	Stadium: City Ground; Attendance: 30,618; Referee: WG Beckley

11 October 1947 12	Cardiff City	1–0	Luton Town	Cardiff
15:15	Billy Rees 90'	Luton report		Stadium: Ninian Park; Attendance: 39,505; Referee: LE Gibbs (Reading)

18 October 1947 13	Brentford	0–0	Cardiff City	London
				Stadium: Griffin Park; Attendance: 34,483

25 October 1947 14	Leicester City	2–1	Cardiff City	Leicester
	Lee (??)		(o.g.) Billy Frame	Stadium: Filbert Street; Attendance: 36,940

1 November 1947 15	Cardiff City	0–0	Leeds United	Cardiff
15:00				Stadium: Ninian Park; Attendance: 36,851; Referee: T Smith (Atherstone)

8 November 1947 16	Fulham	4–1	Cardiff City	London
15:00	Bob Thomas (??); Arthur Stevens (??); Pat Beasley		Colin Gibson	Stadium: Craven Cottage; Attendance: 34,778

15 November 1947 17	Cardiff City	1–1	Coventry City	Cardiff
14:45	Stan Richards 15'		70' (pen.) Norman Lockhart	Stadium: Ninian Park; Attendance: 35,835; Referee: RG Haines (Swindon)

22 November 1947 18	Newcastle United	4–1	Cardiff City	Newcastle
14:30	Jackie Milburn; Jackie Milburn; Len Shackleton; George Stobbart		Arthur Lever	Stadium: St James's Park; Attendance: 57,904; Referee: J Tregellas

29 November 1947 19	Cardiff City	2–0	Birmingham City	Cardiff
14:30	Stan Richards; Stan Richards			Stadium: Ninian Park; Attendance: 39,646; Referee: FJ Lowe (Bath)

6 December 1947 20	West Bromwich Albion	2–3	Cardiff City	West Bromwich
	Peter McKennan; Davy Walsh		Doug Blair; Doug Blair; Colin Gibson	Stadium: The Hawthorns; Attendance: 38,914

13 December 1947 21	Cardiff City	1–0	Barnsley	Cardiff
14:15	George Wardle			Stadium: Ninian Park; Attendance: 33,538; Referee: T Smith (Atherstone)

20 December 1947 22	Chesterfield	2–2	Cardiff City	Chesterfield
14:15	Harold Roberts 7'; Tommy Capel 79'		38' Ron Stitfall; 71' Doug Blair	Stadium: Saltergate; Attendance: 18,959; Referee: AH Tolley (Worcester)

26 December 1947 23	Cardiff City	2–2	Bury	Cardiff
14:30	George Wardle; Colin Gibson		Ernie Woodcock; Don Carter	Stadium: Ninian Park; Attendance: 43,805; Referee: Fred Green (Wolverhampton)

1 January 1948 24	Bury	1–2	Cardiff City	Bury
	Don Carter		Billy Rees; Stan Richards	Stadium: Gigg Lane; Attendance: 12,382

3 January 1948 25	Cardiff City	6–0	Millwall	Cardiff
14:30	Billy Rees; Billy Rees; Doug Blair; Colin Gibson; Stan Richards; Stan Richards			Stadium: Ninian Park; Attendance: 29,483; Referee: LE Gibbs (Reading)

17 January 1948 26	Tottenham Hotspur	2–1	Cardiff City	London
	Freddie Cox (pen.); Johnny Jordan		Billy Rees	Stadium: White Hart Lane; Attendance: 57,386

31 January 1948 27	Cardiff City	2–1	Sheffield Wednesday	Cardiff
15:00	Stan Richards; Billy Rees		Redfern Froggatt	Stadium: Ninian Park; Attendance: 33,147; Referee: AH Blythe (London)

7 February 1948 28	Plymouth Argyle	3–0	Cardiff City	Plymouth
15:15	George Dews 40'; Alf Sherwood 44' (o.g.); Ernie Edds 49'	Plymouth report		Stadium: Home Park; Attendance: 26,396; Referee: R Gaines (Swindon)

14 February 1948 29	Bradford (Park Avenue)	0–1	Cardiff City	Bradford
15:15			Bill Hullett	Stadium: Park Avenue (stadium); Attendance: 14,756; Referee: S McCarthy (Wrexham)

21 February 1948 30	Cardiff City	4–1	Nottingham Forest	Cardiff
15:15	Bill Hullett 33', 82'; George Wardle 44', 62'		10' Tom Johnston	Stadium: Ninian Park; Attendance: 28,929; Referee: WG Beckley

28 February 1948 31	Luton Town	1–1	Cardiff City	Luton
15:15	Mel Daniel	Luton report	85' Bill Hullett	Stadium: Kenilworth Road; Attendance: 22,112; Referee: LE Gibbs (Reading)

6 March 1948 32	Cardiff City	1–0	Brentford	Cardiff
15:15	Bill Hullett			Stadium: Ninian Park; Attendance: 41,032; Referee: Fred Green (Wolverhampton)

13 March 1948 33	Cardiff City	3–0	Leicester City	Cardiff
15:15	Bill Hullett; Bill Hullett; George Wardle			Stadium: Ninian Park; Attendance: 39,100; Referee: AH Tolley (Worcester)

20 March 1948 34	Leeds United	4–0	Cardiff City	Leeds
	Ken Chisholm 3', 15'; Aubrey Powell 71'; John Short 72'			Stadium: Elland Road; Attendance: 34,276

26 March 1948 35	Cardiff City	0–3	West Ham United	Cardiff
15:00			John Stephens; John Stephens; John Stephens	Stadium: Ninian Park; Attendance: 41,700

27 March 1948 36	Cardiff City	0–0	Fulham	Cardiff
15:15				Stadium: Ninian Park; Attendance: 33,786; Referee: FS Milner (Wolverhampton)

29 March 1948 37	West Ham United	4–2	Cardiff City	London
15:00	John Stephens; Eric Parsons; Ken Wright; Ken Wright		Bill Hullett; George Wardle	Stadium: Upton Park; Attendance: 31,667

3 April 1948 38	Coventry City	1–0	Cardiff City	Coventry
	Ted Roberts			Stadium: Highfield Road; Attendance: 26,175

10 April 1948 39	Cardiff City	1–1	Newcastle United	Cardiff
15:15	Arthur Lever		George Stobbart	Stadium: Ninian Park; Attendance: 49,209; Referee: J Tregellis (Birmingham)

17 April 1948 40	Birmingham City	2–0	Cardiff City	Birmingham
	Cyril Trigg; Harold Bodle			Stadium: St Andrew's; Attendance: 52,276; Referee: FT Lowe (Bath)

24 April 1948 41	Cardiff City	0–5	West Bromwich Albion	Cardiff
15:15			(?) Jack Haines (?) Arthur Rowley (?) Arthur Taylor	Stadium: Ninian Park; Attendance: 26,179; Referee: WF Daly (Kent)

1 May 1948 42	Barnsley	1–2	Cardiff City	Barnsley
	George Robledo		Billy Rees; Beriah Moore	Stadium: Oakwell; Attendance: 14,979

=== FA Cup ===
10 January 1948 Round 3	Cardiff City	1–2 (a.e.t.)	Sheffield Wednesday	Cardiff
14:15	Billy Rees		Arnold Lowes; Eddie Quigley (?)	Stadium: Ninian Park; Attendance: 48,000; Referee: Percy Annette (Basingstoke)

=== Welsh Cup ===
15 January 1948 Round 5	Lovell's Athletic	2–1	Cardiff City	Newport
	Goal		Beriah Moore	Stadium: Rexville, Alderney Street; Attendance: 5,000

== See also ==
- List of Cardiff City F.C. seasons
