= 1946–47 Cardiff City F.C. season =

Welsh football club season

Cardiff City
1946–47 season
- Chairman: (Wales) Sir Herbert Merrett
- Manager: (Republic of Ireland) Billy McCandless
- Division Three South: 1st
- FA Cup: 3rd round
- Welsh Cup: 5th round
- Top goalscorer: League: Stan Richards (30); All: Stan Richards (30)
- Highest home attendance: 49,310 (v Bristol City, 7 April 1947)
- Lowest home attendance: 9,384 (v Mansfield Town, 15 March 1947)
- Average home league attendance: 28,604
Home colours

The 1946–47 season was Cardiff City F.C.'s 20th season in the Football League. They competed in the 24-team Division Three South, then the third tier of English football, finishing first and gaining promotion to the Second Division.

== Season review ==
=== Football League Third Division South ===
==== Partial league table ====
| Pos | Team | Pld | W | D | L | GF | GA | GAv | Pts | Promotion |
|---|---|---|---|---|---|---|---|---|---|---|
| 1 | Cardiff City (C, P) | 42 | 30 | 6 | 6 | 93 | 30 | 3.100 | 66 | Promotion to the Second Division |
| 2 | Queens Park Rangers | 42 | 23 | 11 | 8 | 74 | 40 | 1.850 | 57 | |
| 3 | Bristol City | 42 | 20 | 11 | 11 | 94 | 56 | 1.679 | 51 | |
| 4 | Swindon Town | 42 | 19 | 11 | 12 | 84 | 73 | 1.151 | 49 | |
| 5 | Walsall | 42 | 17 | 12 | 13 | 74 | 59 | 1.254 | 46 | |

(C) Champions; (P) Promoted

=== Results by round ===
| Round | 1 | 2 | 3 | 4 | 5 | 6 | 7 | 8 | 9 | 10 | 11 | 12 | 13 | 14 | 15 | 16 | 17 | 18 | 19 | 20 | 21 | 22 | 23 | 24 | 25 | 26 | 27 | 28 | 29 | 30 | 31 | 32 | 33 | 34 | 35 | 36 | 37 | 38 | 39 | 40 | 41 | 42 |
|---|---|---|---|---|---|---|---|---|---|---|---|---|---|---|---|---|---|---|---|---|---|---|---|---|---|---|---|---|---|---|---|---|---|---|---|---|---|---|---|---|---|---|
| Ground | A | A | H | H | A | A | H | H | A | H | A | H | A | H | A | H | A | A | A | A | H | A | H | H | A | H | H | A | H | A | H | A | A | H | H | A | H | H | H | A | A | H |
| Result | L | L | W | W | W | L | W | W | W | W | W | D | W | W | W | W | W | W | W | W | W | D | W | W | W | W | W | L | W | D | D | L | D | D | W | L | W | W | W | W | W | W |
| Position | | | 16 | 8 | 7 | 8 | 8 | 3 | 3 | 2 | 1 | 1 | 1 | 1 | 1 | 1 | 1 | 1 | 1 | 1 | 1 | 1 | 1 | 1 | 1 | 1 | 1 | 1 | 1 | 1 | 1 | 1 | 1 | 1 | 1 | 1 | 1 | 1 | 1 | 1 | 1 | 1 |
| Points | 0 | 0 | 2 | 4 | 6 | 6 | 8 | 10 | 12 | 14 | 16 | 17 | 19 | 21 | 23 | 25 | 27 | 29 | 31 | 33 | 35 | 36 | 38 | 40 | 42 | 44 | 46 | 46 | 48 | 49 | 50 | 50 | 51 | 52 | 54 | 54 | 56 | 58 | 60 | 62 | 64 | 66 |

A = Away; H = Home; W = Win; D = Draw; L = Loss

== Players ==
First team squad. Note: Flags indicate national team as defined under FIFA eligibility rules; some limited exceptions apply. Players may hold more than one non-FIFA nationality.

| No. | Pos. | Nation | Player |
|---|---|---|---|
| -- | GK | WAL | Danny Canning |
| -- | GK | WAL | Wyn Griffiths |
| -- | GK | WAL | George Poland |
| -- | DF | WAL | Ken Hollyman |
| -- | DF | WAL | Arthur Lever |
| -- | DF | WAL | Joe Phillips |
| -- | DF | WAL | Alf Sherwood |
| -- | DF | WAL | Fred Stansfield |
| -- | DF | WAL | Glyn Williams |
| -- | MF | WAL | Billy Baker |
| -- | MF | ENG | Ernie Marshall |

| No. | Pos. | Nation | Player |
|---|---|---|---|
| -- | MF | WAL | Terry Wood |
| -- | FW | WAL | Bryn Allen |
| -- | FW | WAL | Roy Clarke |
| -- | FW | ENG | Colin Gibson |
| -- | FW | WAL | Charlie Hill |
| -- | FW | WAL | Billy James |
| -- | FW | WAL | Billy Lewis |
| -- | FW | WAL | Billy Rees |
| -- | FW | WAL | Stan Richards |
| -- | FW | WAL | Bernard Ross |
| -- | FW | ENG | George Wardle |

== Fixtures and results ==
=== Third Division South ===
| 31 August 1946 1 | Norwich City | 2–1 | Cardiff City | Norwich |
| | Goal | | Stan Richards | Stadium: Carrow Road; Attendance: 20,678 |

| 4 September 1946 2 | Swindon Town | 3–2 | Cardiff City | Swindon |
| | Bill Stephens; Bill Stephens; Gordon Williams | | Bryn Allen; Stan Richards | Stadium: County Ground; Attendance: 14,354 |

| 7 September 1946 3 | Cardiff City | 2–1 | Notts County | Cardiff |
| 15:15 | Billy James; Colin Gibson | | Goal | Stadium: Ninian Park; Attendance: 24,779 |

| 9 September 1946 4 | Cardiff City | 2–0 | Bournemouth | Cardiff |
| | Bryn Allen; Billy James | | | Stadium: Ninian Park; Attendance: 19,239 |

| 14 September 1946 5 | Northampton Town | 0–2 | Cardiff City | Northampton |
| | | | Bryn Allen; Bryn Allen | Stadium: County Ground; Attendance: 8,853 |

| 18 September 1946 6 | Bournemouth | 2–0 | Cardiff City | Bournemouth |
| 18:00 | Goal | | | Stadium: Dean Court; Attendance: 8,926 |

| 21 September 1946 7 | Cardiff City | 2–1 | Aldershot | Cardiff |
| 15:15 | Billy Baker; Roy Clarke | | Goal | Stadium: Ninian Park; Attendance: 22,475 |

| 23 September 1946 8 | Cardiff City | 5–0 | Swindon Town | Cardiff |
| 17:50 | Stan Richards; Bryn Allen; Colin Gibson; Colin Gibson; Colin Gibson | | | Stadium: Ninian Park; Attendance: 19,172 |

| 28 September 1946 9 | Brighton & Hove Albion | 0–4 | Cardiff City | Brighton |
| | | | Billy Rees; Stan Richards; Stan Richards; Bryn Allen | Stadium: Goldstone Ground; Attendance: 13,193; Referee: L Brown |

| 5 October 1946 10 | Cardiff City | 5–0 | Exeter City | Cardiff |
| 15:15 | Bryn Allen; Stan Richards; Stan Richards; Billy Baker; Roy Clarke | | | Stadium: Ninian Park; Attendance: 27,585 |

| 12 October 1946 11 | Port Vale | 0–4 | Cardiff City | Stoke-on-Trent |
| | | | Stan Richards; Stan Richards; Roy Clarke; Billy Rees | Stadium: Old Recreation Ground; Attendance: 10,724; Referee: AT Ford |

| 19 October 1946 12 | Cardiff City | 2–2 | Queens Park Rangers | Cardiff |
| 15:15 | Roy Clarke; Stan Richards | | Cyril Hatton; Fred Durrant | Stadium: Ninian Park; Attendance: 44,010 |

| 26 October 1946 13 | Southend United | 0–2 | Cardiff City | Southend |
| 15:15 | | | Colin Gibson; Billy Rees | Stadium: Roots Hall; Attendance: 12,973; Referee: HC Williams |

| 2 November 1946 14 | Cardiff City | 4–0 | Bristol Rovers | Cardiff |
| 15:00 | Stan Richards; Stan Richards; Bryn Allen; Billy Rees | | | Stadium: Ninian Park; Attendance: 28,699 |

| 9 November 1946 15 | Mansfield Town | 1–3 | Cardiff City | Mansfield |
| | Freddie Hogg | | Stan Richards; Billy Rees; Billy Rees | Stadium: Field Mill; Attendance: 9,827; Referee: FS Milner |

| 16 November 1946 16 | Cardiff City | 1–0 | Torquay United | Cardiff |
| 14:45 | Billy Rees | | | Stadium: Ninian Park; Attendance: 27,259; Referee: GH Hann (Somerset) |

| 23 November 1946 17 | Crystal Palace | 1–2 | Cardiff City | London |
| | Bill Naylor | | Stan Richards; Stan Richards | Stadium: Selhurst Park; Attendance: 25,296 |

| 7 December 1946 18 | Walsall | 2–3 | Cardiff City | Walsall |
| | Dennis Wilshaw (??) | | Bryn Allen; Bryn Allen; Billy Rees | Stadium: Fellows Park; Attendance: 16,386 |

| 21 December 1946 19 | Ipswich Town | 0–1 | Cardiff City | Ipswich |
| 14:15 | | | Colin Gibson | Stadium: Portman Road; Attendance: 12,398 |

| 25 December 1946 20 | Leyton Orient | 0–1 | Cardiff City | London |
| 11:30 | | | Billy Rees | Stadium: Brisbane Road; Attendance: 12,947 |

| 28 December 1946 21 | Cardiff City | 6–1 | Norwich City | Cardiff |
| 14:30 | Stan Richards; Stan Richards; Stan Richards; Billy Rees; Bryn Allen; Roy Clarke | | Henry Spinks | Stadium: Ninian Park; Attendance: 36,285; Referee: HC Williams (Fulham) |

| 4 January 1947 22 | Notts County | 1–1 | Cardiff City | Nottingham |
| | Goal | | Bryn Allen | Stadium: Meadow Lane; Attendance: 28,450 |

| 18 January 1947 23 | Cardiff City | 6–2 | Northampton Town | Cardiff |
| 14:45 | Bryn Allen; Bryn Allen; Bryn Allen; Billy Rees; Billy Rees; Stan Richards | | Goal | Stadium: Ninian Park; Attendance: 29,426; Referee: TE Northcott (Gloucester) |

| 22 January 1947 24 | Cardiff City | 3–0 | Reading | Cardiff |
| 14:45 | Stan Richards; Stan Richards; Roy Clarke | | | Stadium: Ninian Park; Attendance: 28,534 |

| 25 January 1947 25 | Aldershot | 0–1 | Cardiff City | Aldershot |
| 15:00 | | | Stan Richards | Stadium: Recreation Ground; Attendance: 7,239; Referee: FJ Lowe |

| 1 February 1947 26 | Cardiff City | 4–0 | Brighton & Hove Albion | Cardiff |
| 15:00 | Stan Richards; Stan Richards; Billy Rees; Roy Clarke | | | Stadium: Ninian Park; Attendance: 20,533 |

| 1 March 1947 27 | Cardiff City | 3–1 | Southend United | Cardiff |
| 15:15 | Bryn Allen 5'; Roy Clarke 84', 88' | | 45' Frank Dudley | Stadium: Ninian Park; Attendance: 33,698 |

| 8 March 1947 28 | Bristol Rovers | 1–0 | Cardiff City | Bristol |
| | Lance Carr | | | Stadium: Eastville; Attendance: 30,455 |

| 15 March 1947 29 | Cardiff City | 5–0 | Mansfield Town | Cardiff |
| 15:15 | Ken Hollyman; Colin Gibson; Stan Richards; Stan Richards; Roy Clarke | | | Stadium: Ninian Park; Attendance: 9,384; Referee: FS Milner (Wolverhampton) |

| 22 March 1947 30 | Torquay United | 0–0 | Cardiff City | Torquay |
| 15:30 | | | | Stadium: Plainmoor; Attendance: 9,352 |

| 29 March 1947 31 | Cardiff City | 0–0 | Crystal Palace | Cardiff |
| 15:15 | | | | Stadium: Ninian Park; Attendance: 24,214; Referee: FJ Lowe (Bath) |

| 4 April 1947 32 | Bristol City | 2–1 | Cardiff City | Bristol |
| | Don Clark 35'; Sammy Collins 54' | | 73' Billy Rees | Stadium: Ashton Gate; Attendance: 32,535 |

| 5 April 1947 33 | Reading | 0–0 | Cardiff City | Reading |
| | | | | Stadium: Elm Park; Attendance: 21,627 |

| 7 April 1947 34 | Cardiff City | 1–1 | Bristol City | Cardiff |
| 15:15 | Stan Richards 80' | | 23' Sid Williams | Stadium: Ninian Park; Attendance: 49,310 |

| 12 April 1947 35 | Cardiff City | 3–0 | Walsall | Cardiff |
| 15:15 | Charles Hill; Charles Hill; Colin Gibson | | | Stadium: Ninian Park; Attendance: 33,195; Referee: WT Strainge (Bristol) |

| 19 April 1947 36 | Watford | 2–0 | Cardiff City | Watford |
| | Goal | | | Stadium: Vicarage Road; Attendance: 20,030 |

| 26 April 1947 37 | Cardiff City | 3–2 | Ipswich Town | Cardiff |
| 15:15 | Colin Gibson; Stan Richards; Bryn Allen | | Matt O'Mahoney; Stan Parker | Stadium: Ninian Park; Attendance: 31,219; Referee: Reg Greenwood (Norwood) |

| 3 May 1947 38 | Cardiff City | 1–0 | Watford | Cardiff |
| 15:15 | Stan Richards | | | Stadium: Ninian Park; Attendance: 30,368 |

| 10 May 1947 39 | Cardiff City | 1–0 | Port Vale | Cardiff |
| 15:15 | Stan Richards | | | Stadium: Ninian Park; Attendance: 36,732 |

| 17 May 1947 40 | Exeter City | 0–2 | Cardiff City | Exeter |
| | | | Colin Gibson; Billy Rees | Stadium: St James Park; Attendance: 12,031; Referee: GV Searle (Salisbury) |

| 24 May 1947 41 | Queens Park Rangers | 2–3 | Cardiff City | London |
| | Goal | | George Wardle; Bernard Ross; Bernard Ross | Stadium: Loftus Road; Attendance: 23,272 |

| 7 June 1947 42 | Cardiff City | 1–0 | Leyton Orient | Cardiff |
| 15:15 | Billy Rees | | | Stadium: Ninian Park; Attendance: 24,572; Referee: S McCarthy (Wrexham) |

=== FA Cup ===
| 11 January 1947 Round 3 | Brentford | 1–0 | Cardiff City | London |
| | Goal | | | Stadium: Griffin Park; Attendance: 32,894 |

=== Welsh Cup ===
| 6 February 1947 Round 5 | Merthyr Tydfil | 4–2 | Cardiff City | Merthyr Tydfil |
| | Goal | | Billy Rees; Billy James | Stadium: Penydarren Park; Attendance: 3,000 |

== See also ==
- List of Cardiff City F.C. seasons
