= 1952–53 Newport County A.F.C. season =

Welsh association football club season

Newport County
1952–53 season
- Manager: Fred Stansfield
- Stadium: Somerton Park
- Third Division South: 15th
- FA Cup: 3rd round
- Welsh Cup: 6th round
- Top goalscorer: League: Parker (16); All: Parker (17)
- Highest home attendance: 22,000 vs Sheffield United (FA Cup, 10 Jan 1953)
- Lowest home attendance: 3,100 vs Southend United (15 Jan 1953)
- Average home league attendance: 8,841
Home colours	Away colours

The 1952–53 season was Newport County's sixth consecutive season in the Third Division South since relegation from the Second Division at the end of the 1946–47 season. It was the club's 24th season in the third tier and 25th season overall in the Football League.

== Season review ==
=== Results summary ===
Overall								Home						Away					
Pld	W	D	L	GF	GA	GAv	Pts	W	D	L	GF	GA	Pts	W	D	L	GF	GA	Pts
46	16	10	20	70	82	0.854	42	12	4	7	43	34	28	4	6	13	27	48	14

Source: rsssf.com

=== Results by round ===
Round	1	2	3	4	5	6	7	8	9	10	11	12	13	14	15	16	17	18	19	20	21	22	23	24	25	26	27	28	29	30	31	32	33	34	35	36	37	38	39	40	41	42	43	44	45	46
Ground	H	A	A	H	H	H	A	A	H	H	A	A	H	H	A	H	A	H	A	A	A	A	H	A	H	H	A	H	A	A	H	A	A	H	A	H	A	H	H	A	A	H	H	H	A	H
Result	L	W	L	W	W	W	D	W	W	D	L	L	L	W	L	W	D	L	L	L	L	D	L	D	W	L	L	W	L	L	L	L	D	W	L	W	D	D	D	W	W	D	W	W	L	L
Position	15	11	18	13	11	8	8	6	3	4	7	9	12	9	10	8	8	9	12	15	16	16	16	15	14	14	16	14	16	18	18	20	21	19	21	20	20	20	20	18	16	13	14	13	13	14

Updated to match(es) played on 30 Apr 1953. Source: statto.com
A = Away; H = Home; W = Win; D = Draw; L = Loss

== Fixtures and results ==
=== Third Division South ===
Date	Opponents	Venue	Result	Scorers	Attendance
23 Aug 1952	Gillingham	H	1–2	Moore	11,111
28 Aug 1952	Walsall	A	3–1	Parker 2, Birch	10,062
30 Aug 1952	Crystal Palace	A	1–2	Parker	14,394
4 Sep 1952	Walsall	H	3–2	Shergold, Moore, Nelson	8,231
6 Sep 1952	Bristol City	H	4–3	Shergold, Moore, Nelson, OG	9,573
11 Sep 1952	Bournemouth & Boscombe Athletic	H	2–1	Shergold, Moore	9,127
13 Sep 1952	Torquay United	A	3–3	Parker 3	7,064
17 Sep 1952	Bournemouth & Boscombe Athletic	A	2–1	Parker, Nelson	10,187
20 Sep 1952	Northampton Town	H	4–1	Parker 2, Moore 2	10,481
25 Sep 1952	Coventry City	H	4–4	Staples 2, Birch, Parker	10,935
27 Sep 1952	Leyton Orient	A	1–2	Shergold	11,744
1 Oct 1952	Reading	A	1–2	Moore	6,739
4 Oct 1952	Ipswich Town	H	1–3	Moore	9,645
11 Oct 1952	Shrewsbury Town	H	4–2	Beattie, Parker, Shergold, Moore	9,322
18 Oct 1952	Queens Park Rangers	A	2–4	Beattie, Parker	14,800
25 Oct 1952	Swindon Town	H	3–0	Parker 2, Moore	7,971
1 Nov 1952	Aldershot	A	2–2	Parker 2	6,100
8 Nov 1952	Colchester United	H	0–1		8,989
15 Nov 1952	Norwich City	A	0–2		23,899
29 Nov 1952	Exeter City	A	2–3	Beattie, Moore	6,848
13 Dec 1952	Millwall	A	0–3		12,622
20 Dec 1952	Gillingham	A	1–1	Moore	7,179
25 Dec 1952	Brighton & Hove Albion	H	0–3		10,627
27 Dec 1952	Brighton & Hove Albion	A	2–2	Birch, Shergold	15,309
3 Jan 1953	Crystal Palace	H	3–2	Beattie, Shergold, OG	8,062
15 Jan 1953	Southend United	H	0–1		3,100
17 Jan 1953	Bristol City	A	0–2		20,572
24 Jan 1953	Torquay United	H	3–0	Evans 3	8,038
31 Jan 1953	Southend United	A	0–1		5,690
7 Feb 1953	Northampton Town	A	0–5		13,250
14 Feb 1953	Leyton Orient	H	0–1		5,182
21 Feb 1953	Ipswich Town	A	0–3		10,019
28 Feb 1953	Shrewsbury Town	A	1–1	Beattie	8,528
7 Mar 1953	Queens Park Rangers	H	2–0	Beattie, Graham	7,971
14 Mar 1953	Swindon Town	A	0–2		7,445
21 Mar 1953	Aldershot	H	2–1	Beattie, Graham	7,929
28 Mar 1953	Colchester United	A	3–3	Graham 2, Beattie	6,200
3 Apr 1953	Watford	H	1–1	Beattie	9,319
4 Apr 1953	Norwich City	H	1–1	Graham	8,375
6 Apr 1953	Watford	A	1–0	Beattie	11,455
11 Apr 1953	Coventry City	A	1–0	Graham	11,204
13 Apr 1953	Bristol Rovers	H	2–2	Stroud, Graham	16,007
18 Apr 1953	Exeter City	H	1–0	Evans	8,220
23 Apr 1953	Reading	H	1–0	Hayward	8,405
25 Apr 1953	Bristol Rovers	A	1–3	Beattie	29,451
30 Apr 1953	Millwall	H	1–3	Graham	6,728

=== FA Cup ===
Round	Date	Opponents	Venue	Result	Scorers	Attendance
1	22 Nov 1952	Walsall	H	2–1	Beatie, Moore	10,000
2	6 Dec 1952	Gainsborough Trinity	H	2–1	Beattie, Parker	9,911
3	10 Jan 1953	Sheffield United	H	1–4	Moore	22,000

=== Welsh Cup ===
Round	Date	Opponents	Venue	Result	Scorers	Attendance
5	1 Jan 1953	Haverfordwest	A	8–1	Beatie 3, Evans 2, Morrey 2, Shergold	
6	29 Jan 1953	Swansea Town	A	2–3	Rees, Morrey	5,500

== League table ==
Pos	Team	Pld	W	D	L	GF	GA	GAv	Pts
13	Crystal Palace	46	15	13	18	66	82	0.805	43
14	Leyton Orient	46	16	10	20	68	73	0.932	42
15	Newport County	46	16	10	20	70	82	0.854	42
16	Ipswich Town	46	13	15	18	60	69	0.870	41
17	Exeter City	46	13	14	19	61	71	0.859	40
