= 1950–51 Newport County A.F.C. season =

Welsh association football club season

Newport County
1950–51 season
- Manager: Fred Stansfield
- Stadium: Somerton Park
- Third Division South: 11th
- FA Cup: 4th round
- Welsh Cup: Semi-final
- Top goalscorer: League: Parker (22); All: Parker (27)
- Highest home attendance: 20,293 vs Norwich City (27 January 1951)
- Lowest home attendance: 5,563 vs Bournemouth (30 April 1951)
- Average home league attendance: 11,506
Home colours	Away colours

The 1950–51 season was Newport County's fourth consecutive season in the Third Division South since relegation from the Second Division at the end of the 1946–47 season. It was the club's 22nd season in the third tier and 23rd season overall in the Football League.

== Season review ==
=== Results summary ===
Overall								Home						Away					
Pld	W	D	L	GF	GA	GAv	Pts	W	D	L	GF	GA	Pts	W	D	L	GF	GA	Pts
46	19	9	18	77	70	1.1	47	13	4	6	48	25	30	6	5	12	29	45	17

Source: rsssf.com

=== Results by round ===
Round	1	2	3	4	5	6	7	8	9	10	11	12	13	14	15	16	17	18	19	20	21	22	23	24	25	26	27	28	29	30	31	32	33	34	35	36	37	38	39	40	41	42	43	44	45	46
Ground	H	A	A	H	H	A	A	H	H	H	A	H	H	A	H	A	H	A	H	H	H	A	H	A	H	A	H	A	A	A	H	A	A	A	H	A	A	A	H	A	A	H	H	H	A	H
Result	L	L	W	W	W	W	L	D	W	D	L	L	L	L	W	L	L	L	W	L	W	D	W	L	W	D	W	D	D	W	L	W	D	L	W	W	L	W	W	L	L	D	D	W	L	W
Position	19	24	16	12	7	6	7	9	7	4	6	8	9	12	12	12	14	16	15	17	15	15	13	14	14	14	13	13	12	12	13	12	12	14	14	13	14	12	11	12	12	11	11	11	11	11

Updated to match(es) played on 5 May 1951. Source: statto.com
A = Away; H = Home; W = Win; D = Draw; L = Loss

== Fixtures and results ==
=== Third Division South ===
Date	Opponents	Venue	Result	Scorers	Attendance
19 Aug 1950	Nottingham Forest	H	0–2		16,595
24 Aug 1950	Port Vale	A	0–1		30,196
26 Aug 1950	Torquay United	A	4–3	Cowley, Parker, Roffi, Shergold	10,276
31 Aug 1950	Port Vale	H	2–1	Parker, Moore	13,537
2 Sep 1950	Aldershot	H	7–0	Roffi 4, Parker 2, M.Haines	13,696
7 Sep 1950	Watford	A	2–0	Parker, Moore	9,451
9 Sep 1950	Swindon Town	A	0–2		14,021
14 Sep 1950	Watford	H	2–2	Newall, M.Haines	12,116
16 Sep 1950	Colchester United	H	2–0	Parker 2	16,021
21 Sep 1950	Northampton Town	H	2–2	Parker, Moore	13,845
23 Sep 1950	Bristol Rovers	A	0–1		19,816
30 Sep 1950	Crystal Palace	H	2–4	Cowley, Moore	10,114
7 Oct 1950	Millwall	H	2–3	Moore, Beattie	13,129
14 Oct 1950	Bristol City	A	1–2	Parker	22,930
21 Oct 1950	Gillingham	H	1–0	Shergold	9,828
28 Oct 1950	Bournemouth & Boscombe Athletic	A	0–2		13,466
4 Nov 1950	Exeter City	H	0–3		10,653
11 Nov 1950	Southend United	A	0–3		9,882
18 Nov 1950	Reading	H	5–0	Birch 2, Parker, Shergold, Aston	8,529
2 Dec 1950	Ipswich Town	H	1–2	Hayward	11,496
23 Dec 1950	Torquay United	H	2–1	Parker, Shergold	8,369
25 Dec 1950	Walsall	A	0–0		7,832
26 Dec 1950	Walsall	H	3–0	Parker, Moore, Birch	13,160
30 Dec 1950	Aldershot	A	1–3	Moore	6,291
13 Jan 1951	Swindon Town	H	2–1	Shergold, Birch	12,485
20 Jan 1951	Colchester United	A	1–1	Birch	8,230
3 Feb 1951	Bristol Rovers	H	2–1	Birch 2	11,802
10 Feb 1951	Plymouth Argyle	A	1–1	Parker	13,408
17 Feb 1951	Crystal Palace	A	1–1	Shergold	9,990
24 Feb 1951	Millwall	A	4–2	Parker, Moore, Shergold, Beattie	15,788
3 Mar 1951	Bristol City	H	0–1		11,494
10 Mar 1951	Gillingham	A	1–0	Birch	9,040
24 Mar 1951	Exeter City	A	2–2	Parker, Beattie	7,565
26 Mar 1951	Norwich City	A	1–2	Birch	35,267
31 Mar 1951	Southend United	H	6–1	Moore 2, Shergold 2, Parker, Birch	9,544
5 Apr 1951	Northampton Town	A	4–1	Moore 2, Hayward, Parker	6,425
7 Apr 1951	Reading	A	0–5		12,939
12 Apr 1951	Leyton Orient	A	3–0	Parker, Moore, Shergold	8,270
14 Apr 1951	Plymouth Argyle	H	2–0	Parker, Moore	11,962
18 Apr 1951	Brighton & Hove Albion	A	1–9	Parker	12,114
21 Apr 1951	Ipswich Town	A	1–2	Moore	10,294
25 Apr 1951	Norwich City	H	1–1	Moore	13,862
28 Apr 1951	Leyton Orient	H	0–0		7,564
30 Apr 1951	Bournemouth & Boscombe Athletic	H	1–0	Shergold	5,563
2 May 1951	Nottingham Forest	A	1–2	Parker	21,468
5 May 1951	Brighton & Hove Albion	H	3–0	Parker, Moore, Birch	9,274

=== FA Cup ===
Round	Date	Opponents	Venue	Result	Scorers	Attendance
1	25 Nov 1950	Walsall	H	4–2	Parker 2, Hayward, Shergold	13,891
2	9 Dec 1950	Hereford United	A	3–0	Parker, Moore, Shergold	15,526
3	6 Jan 1951	Reading	H	3–2	Parker, Birch, Shergold	12,086
4	27 Jan 1951	Norwich City	H	0–2		20,293

=== Welsh Cup ===
Round	Date	Opponents	Venue	Result	Scorers	Attendance	Notes
5	31 Jan 1951	Ebbw Vale	A	2–1	James, Newall	3,000	
6	1 Mar 1951	Swansea Town	H	2–1	Hayward, Parker	7,554	
SF	23 Apr 1951	Merthyr Tydfil	N	1–1	Moore	23,401	At Ninian Park
SFr	26 Apr 1951	Merthyr Tydfil	N	1–4	Moore	12,000	At Ninian Park

== League table ==
Pos	Team	Pld	W	D	L	GF	GA	GAv	Pts
9	Bournemouth & Boscombe Athletic	46	22	7	17	65	57	1.140	51
10	Bristol City	46	20	11	15	64	59	1.085	51
11	Newport County	46	19	9	18	77	70	1.100	47
12	Port Vale	46	16	13	17	60	65	0.923	45
13	Brighton & Hove Albion	46	13	17	16	71	79	0.899	43
