= History of Cardiff City F.C. (1899–1962) =

History of a Welsh football club

Cardiff City Football Club is a professional association football team based in Cardiff, Wales. The history of Cardiff City F.C. from 1899 to 1962 covers the club's founding, its move into the Southern Football League and its election to the Football League to the end of the 1961–62 season.

Founded in 1899 as Riverside A.F.C., the club was renamed Cardiff City in 1908 and joined the Southern Football League two years later. The side was elected into the Second Division of the Football League in 1920, winning promotion to the First Division in its first season. The team finished as runners-up in the 1923–24 season, missing out on the title by the closest margin in First Division history. They reached their first FA Cup final the following year before becoming the only non-English team to win the trophy in the 1927 final when they defeated Arsenal 1–0 after a goal from Hughie Ferguson.

Soon after its cup triumph, the club entered a decline that saw the side relegated to the Third Division South by 1932. Financial problems coincided with their descent and the team finished bottom of the Football League at the end of the 1933–34 season and were forced to apply for re-election. After the Second World War, the club enjoyed a resurgence and won the Third Division South title in the first season after the conflict. The team returned to the First Division soon after and spent most of the 1950s in the top tier of English football.

== Early years (1899–1910) ==
In 1899, Bristol-born lithographic artist Bartley Wilson began searching for a way of keeping players from the Riverside Cricket Club, where he was a member, together and in shape during the winter months when the cricket season had ended. Wilson, who had moved to Cardiff in 1895 to work for the Imperial Printing Company, organised a meeting at his home near Cardiff Castle in the autumn of 1899. The first meeting was met with a lukewarm reception but Wilson was undeterred and a second, more widely attended meeting, resulted in the founding of Riverside A.F.C. Wilson was appointed secretary of the new club.

The newly formed club committee levied an annual membership fee of a half crown and adopted a kit consisting of chocolate and amber quarters, an unusual combination at the time, with black shorts and socks. The club had missed the deadline to join the Cardiff & District League in its first season and instead played friendlies against local sides at its Sophia Gardens ground. The team played their first fixture against Barry West End on 7 October 1899, suffering a 9–1 defeat. Undeterred, they played several other friendlies before joining the Cardiff & District League for their first competitive season in 1900. Improvements made to Sophia Gardens, including the installation of gas and water resulted in increased memberships and the club merged with nearby Riverside Albion in 1902. It took a further three years until the club won its first trophy, the Bevan Shield, a local competition organised by the South Wales and Monmouthshire Football Association (SWMFA). Cardiff was granted city status by King Edward VII in 1905 and as a result the club put in a request to change its name to Cardiff City. The request was turned down as they were deemed to be not playing at a high enough level. To combat this, they arranged to join the South Wales Amateur League in 1907 and the following year they were granted permission to change the name of the club to Cardiff City. The club received permission from the SWMFA on the stipulation that should a professional team be founded in the city, they would relinquish the name.

Interest in the game in South Wales began to rise during this time and officials from the Southern Football League, who were looking to expand and start a Second Division, toured the area looking for potential entrants. Ton Pentre, Merthyr Town and Aberdare were all accepted into the new division but Cardiff were denied the opportunity due to the poor standard of facilities at their Sophia Gardens ground, including the lack of turnstiles and inadequate conditions for spectators. In the hope of raising funds and gauging public support, the club's committee were able to arrange a friendly match against Southern League First Division side Crystal Palace in October 1909, held at the nearby Cardiff Arms Park home of local rugby team Cardiff RFC. The match ended in a 3–3 draw and yielded gate receipts of £33 for the club. A second friendly was hastily arranged for the following month, with Football League First Division side Bristol City the opponents. However, despite increased takings of £50, Bristol's appearance fee severely depleted profits and the match ended in a disheartening 7–1 defeat. The committee pushed forward with a third friendly with Middlesbrough, also of the Football League First Division, chosen as opponents. The match was held at Harlequins Ground, part of Cardiff High School, with Cardiff defeating a Middlesbrough side that featured several England international players 2–1 and netted the club a £39 profit.

Encouraged by the response generated by the fixtures, Wilson and the club's committee opened talks with the Bute Estate, one of the major landowners in the city, in the hope of finding a suitable site for the construction of a new ground. They were offered a former rubbish tip, located between a railway station and Sloper Road on an initial seven-year lease for an annual rent of £90. With the assistance of local volunteers and workers of the Cardiff Corporation, the site was cleared and levelled and a single wooden stand was erected. When one of the club's guarantors pulled out of the deal Lord Ninian Crichton-Stuart, son of John Crichton-Stuart, 3rd Marquess of Bute, stepped in to cover the shortfall. In appreciation, the new ground was named Ninian Park. The other four guarantors for the site were David Alfred Thomas, 1st Viscount Rhondda, J. Bell Harrison and local councillors Charles Wall and H.C. Vivian. A further 24 people offered to become sureties if their contribution would be limited to £5. On 21 April 1910, the club officially became a listed company with the registration of Cardiff City Association Football Club Limited, listing £3,000 in capital.

== Southern Football League (1910–20) ==
With the new ground in place, Cardiff were granted admission into the Southern Football League Second Division for the 1910–11 season. A board of directors was also elected to professionalise the club, with Sydney Nicholls named as the organisation's first chairman and Wilson continuing in his role as club secretary. The club also made its first professional signing the following year with the acquisition of outside-forward Jack Evans from fellow Welsh side Cwmparc, with Evans receiving a signing on fee of six shillings to cover his travel expenses.

The club soon decided on the need to appoint a manager and Wilson was quick to hire the first in the club's history in Davy McDougall, who became player-manager and captain. Ninian Park was officially opened on 1 September 1910 with a 2–1 friendly defeat to reigning Football League First Division champions Aston Villa with Cardiff having adopted their now traditional blue shirts, white shorts and blue socks. A ceremonial kick-off was performed by Crichton-Stuart and the newly signed Evans scored the only Cardiff goal. Three weeks later, on 24 September, Cardiff played its first competitive match at Ninian Park and the first match of the new professional era as the side recorded a 4–1 victory over Ton Pentre in the opening match of the 1910–11 season which attracted a crowd of around 8000.

The side finished a creditable fourth in their first season but the club's committee believed a more experienced manager was required and decided to replace McDougall. The club placed an advert in the Athletic News and eventually appointed Fred Stewart, who had experience of managing in the Football League with Stockport County. Stewart was appointed on a three-year contract earning £4 a week, the maximum wage a player could earn at the time. He began a complete overhaul of the playing squad, retaining only four of the players he inherited from McDougall (Evans, Bob Lawrie, Ted Husbands and Tom Abley), and began recruiting mainly from Scotland and the North-west of England. His first signing at the club was Billy Hardy, with Stewart paying the £25 transfer fee himself. Hardy and fellow new arrivals Patrick Cassidy and Kidder Harvey formed a defensive partnership that led to the trio being dubbed the "holy three" by fans. After leading the team to victory in the Welsh Cup in his first season, becoming the first team from the South of Wales to win the trophy, he guided the team to promotion after winning the Southern Football League Second Division in the 1912–13 season, losing only one match during the campaign. Cardiff remained in the First Division for two further seasons, finishing third during the 1914–15 season, before competitive football was suspended following the outbreak of World War I. At the start of the conflict, the club's entire playing squad volunteered for home defence duty and Ninian Park was used for drilling practice. Nine players on the club's books eventually enlisted in the forces, the most notable being Fred Keenor and backup goalkeeper John Stephenson. Reserve player Tom Witts was the only contracted Cardiff player killed during the conflict. On the cessation of hostilities, Cardiff spent one final season in the Southern League, finishing fourth in the First Division, and won the Welsh Cup for the second time.

== Entry into The Football League (1920–25) ==
With the Football League expanding to three divisions and incorporating many of the Southern Football League teams, Cardiff submitted an application to join the organisation. On 31 May 1920, the club was accepted into the Football League Second Division, along with Leeds United, after receiving 25 votes. The outcome of the ballot saw them placed in a higher division than the three teams, Portsmouth, Watford and Crystal Palace, that had finished above them the previous season.

Stewart looked to strengthen the squad by signing thirteen new players, most of whom had previous Football League experience, including paying £750 for The Wednesday forward Jimmy Gill. In the team's first match in the Football League, they defeated Stewart's former employers Stockport County 5–2. On 30 August 1920, Cardiff played their first Football League match at Ninian Park, where 25,000 supporters watched a scoreless draw with Clapton Orient. The first ever Football League victory for Cardiff at their home ground occurred five days later, when Stockport County were beaten 3–0. In November 1920, Stewart broke the club's transfer record to sign another Wednesday player, Jimmy Blair arriving for £3,500. In their first season, the side issued a strong showing, winning promotion to the Football League First Division after finishing as runners-up to Birmingham on goal average. The side also reached the semi-final of the FA Cup, where they were defeated by Wolverhampton Wanderers after a replay.

Cardiff now found itself in the top tier of the Football League after a single season. In their first match of the 1921–22 season, over 50,000 spectators arrived to witness a fixture against Tottenham Hotspur. When club officials attempted to close turnstiles with the ground at full capacity, spectators who were still queuing proceeded to break through the barriers with club estimates believing between 6–10,000 extra fans forced their way into the ground. Cardiff suffered a difficult start to the campaign, losing its first six matches. Despite this slow start, the side improved and finished the campaign in fourth place. During the course of the season, Len Davies also scored the club's first hat-trick in the Football League during a 6–3 win over Bradford City.

The 1923–24 season proved to be the club's highest ever finish in the Football League after a season in which they competed with Huddersfield Town for the First Division title. Cardiff had led the division for a considerable part of the campaign and went into the final match one point ahead of second placed Huddersfield. Their rivals eventually beat their opponents on the day, Nottingham Forest by a scoreline of 3–0, meaning Cardiff needed a victory over Birmingham to claim the title. With the scoreline deadlocked at 0–0, Cardiff were awarded a penalty after Gill's header was handled in the penalty box. Top scorer Len Davies took the spot kick, however his effort was saved and the match finished goalless. The result meant Cardiff were forced to settle for second place on goal average. Although having scored one more goal than Huddersfield during the season, Cardiff also conceded one more meaning they had a worse scoring to conceding ratio of 1.794 compared with Huddersfield's 1.818. This resulted in Huddersfield being crowned First Division champions by 0.024 of a goal, the closest margin of victory for any First Division title. During the season, Cardiff also became the first club to provide the captains of both teams in an international friendly when Wales and Scotland met in February 1924, with Fred Keenor captaining Wales and Jimmy Blair captaining Scotland.

== FA Cup Finals (1925–27) ==
The following season was the first time Cardiff City appeared at Wembley Stadium (1925). In the first round of the FA Cup, Cardiff beat Third Division side Darlington after two replays and this was followed by a 1–0 home win against Fulham. The Bluebirds then travelled to Meadow Lane in the third round where they defeated Notts County 2–0 before a quarter-final tie against Leicester City was decided when Cardiff's Willie Davies scored directly from a corner with the last kick of the game. In the semi-finals, Cardiff defeated Blackburn Rovers 3–1 to set up a final against Sheffield United. After a dour final played out in front of 91,763 fans, the game was decided by England international Fred Tunstall who capitalised on a mistake by Harry Wake to score the only goal in a 1–0 victory for Sheffield United. After the defeat, Cardiff captain Keenor declared that the team would return to Wembley and "bring the Cup to Wales."

The 1925–26 season got off to an inauspicious start when Jimmy Nelson received the club's first red card in the Football League after being sent off against Manchester City on the opening day. During the season, Cardiff also suffered the heaviest defeat in the club's history, losing 11–2 to Sheffield United at Bramall Lane. The season ended as being their worst since their promotion six years earlier, finishing 16th. However, City had a record total of 16 international players, representing Wales, Ireland and Scotland.

In the 1926–27 season, Cardiff reached the second FA Cup final in the club's history. The side entered the competition in the third round, where they defeated Aston Villa 2–1 at Ninian Park. Trips to Darlington and holders Bolton Wanderers in the fourth and fifth rounds respectively followed, both finished with the same scorelines; 2–0 wins for Cardiff. In the quarter-finals, Cardiff met Chelsea in another away fixture. A goalless draw at Stamford Bridge, in front of 70,184 people led to a replay at Ninian Park. Having led 2–0 thanks to goals by Sam Irving and Len Davies, Cardiff allowed Chelsea to get back into the fixture, and soon after half-time the scores were once again level at 2–2. As the tie began to look destined for another draw, Hughie Ferguson netted the winning goal from the penalty spot. At the semi-final stage, Cardiff met Reading at Molineux, recording a comfortable 3–0 victory.

On St George's Day, 23 April 1927, Cardiff met Arsenal in the 1927 FA Cup Final at Wembley Stadium. Despite having appeared in a final two years earlier, Cardiff were regarded as underdogs ahead of the match. In the 74th minute of the match, after collecting a throw from the right, Ferguson hurried a tame shot toward the Arsenal goal. Dan Lewis, the Arsenal goalkeeper, appeared to collect the ball but, under pressure from the advancing Len Davies, clumsily allowed the ball to roll through his grasp. In a desperate attempt to retrieve the ball Lewis only succeeded in knocking the ball with his elbow into his own net. Ernie Curtis, the 19-year-old Cardiff player who became the youngest player to appear in an FA Cup final at the time, said of the goal:

"I was in line with the edge of the penalty area on the right when Hughie Ferguson hit the shot which Arsenal's goalie had crouched down for a little early. The ball spun as it travelled towards him, having taken a slight deflection so he was now slightly out of line with it. Len Davies was following the shot in and I think Dan must have had one eye on him. The result was that he didn't take it cleanly and it squirmed under him and over the line. Len jumped over him and into the net, but never actually touched it."

It is believed that this cup final attracted one of the highest audiences ever, as it was the first to be broadcast by BBC Radio. Captain Fred Keenor received the FA Cup trophy from King George V only seven years after Cardiff had entered the Football League and six seasons since they had been promoted to the top division. By winning the trophy, Cardiff became the only club from outside England to win the competition with their triumph being described as "one of the most iconic events in Welsh sporting history." Ferguson's tally of 32 goals in all competitions during the season also set a club record that stood until Robert Earnshaw overtook it in March 2003. Cardiff went on to add two further trophies soon after; the side also won the Welsh Cup defeating Rhyl 2–0, and would go on to win the Charity Shield after beating the Corinthians 2–1 at Stamford Bridge.

== Pre-war decline (1927–39) ==
The following season, 1927–28, once again resulted in a top six finish for Cardiff. Having led the Championship for a brief spell during mid-season, they were unable to maintain momentum and gradually dropped out of the title race. Their hopes of retaining the FA Cup were ended at the fifth-round stage, when they were beaten by Nottingham Forest. The following year, Cardiff were relegated from the First Division. Following their FA Cup win, the Cardiff board had decided to invest the winnings in a new roof for the Grange End stand at Ninian Park, leaving little money for manager Fred Stewart to invest in the side. This, coupled with several long-term injuries to first team players, resulted in relegation despite conceding the fewest goals of all teams in the division that year.

After two seasons in the Second Division, they were relegated in 1931 into Division Three South after winning only 8 of their 42 league matches. During the club's first season in the bottom division of the Football League, Cardiff recorded the biggest league victory in its history after defeating Thames by a scoreline of 9–2, Walter Robbins scoring five. Over the course of their decline in the early 1930s, several of the club's long-serving players moved on, including Fred Keenor, Len Davies and Billy Hardy. Manager Fred Stewart, who had been in charge for 22 years, and trainer George Latham also left their positions. Stewart remains the longest serving manager in the club's history.

Club founder Bartley Wilson was chosen to replace Fred Stewart; however the results failed to improve with club also struggling financially. In March 1934, Wilson stepped down from his post and Ben Watts-Jones was given the opportunity to manage the club he had supported as a youngster. However, he was unable to turn the club's fortunes around by the end of the season; meaning Cardiff City were forced to apply for re-election after finishing bottom of the division. Watts-Jones remained in charge for another three years and led an overhaul of the playing squad until he was replaced by Bill Jennings, a former Welsh international who had been brought to the club originally as trainer four years previously.

In January 1937, the Grandstand at Ninian Park was destroyed by fire after thieves broke in an attempt to steal gate receipts from a recent FA Cup fixture against Grimsby Town. Under Jennings, there were signs that the worst was over both on and off the field. The teams' results began to improve over the next two seasons, and in turn; this meant that more fans were coming to Ninian Park to see their team's revival. Industrialist Herbert Merrett took an interest in the club and over a year, acquired control of the club and wiped out its longstanding debts. The 1938–39 season saw the debut of a midfielder who would be a prominent member of future City sides; Billy Baker, however a final league position of 13th in the division led new chairman Herbert Merrett to appoint Cyril Spiers as secretary-manager to replace Jennings for the 1939–40 season. However, the Football League season was abandoned after the opening three matches following the outbreak of World War II.

== Wartime and revival (1939–62) ==
Spiers instead decided to use the time to develop the club's youth structure, setting up a nursery side nearby to attract the most talented local youngsters. Numerous players at the club served during the conflict although reserve team goalkeeper Jackie Pritchard was the only player who perished. Some players, such as Billy James, found that the war left them unable to return to professional football. Several players who had trained in the club's feeder teams during the war went on to form the backbone of the first team on the resumption of the Football League for the 1946–47 season. However, Spiers was not around to take part in their success having resigned from his position over a contractual dispute with the board. He had agreed to take a paycut during the war but walked out after the board refused to restore his original contract at the end of hostilities. Billy McCandless was appointed in his stead and, despite suffering defeat against Spiers' new side Norwich City in their opening game, they were crowned as champions of Third Division South after finishing nine points clear of their nearest rivals. Forward Stan Richards scored 30 league goals during the campaign, setting a new club record that stood until 2003. Despite his success, McCandless decided to accept an offer from local rivals Swansea Town and left his position. In response, Spiers settled his argument with the board and return to the club for a second spell.

In 1952, Cardiff achieved promotion back to the First Division for the first time since 1929 after finishing second, overtaking Birmingham City on the final day of the season. Spiers would depart the club a second time in 1954, having believed to have fallen out with chairman Herbert Merrett again over the signing of Trevor Ford. Spiers had pushed for Ford's arrival, which was eventually granted, although Merrett resented the £30,000 transfer fee which he claimed "reduced the club's working profit by half". Later the same year, Bartley Wilson who had served the club in some capacity since he helped found it over 50 years previously retired and died six months later.

Following the return of the Football League Cardiff chairman Sir Herbert Merrett established close links with Torquay United after being a regular visitor to a hotel owned by the Torquay chairman. The arrangement saw any players Cardiff thought not good enough would be offered to Torquay and Cardiff would get first refusal on any players who were thought good enough to make it in higher leagues. A number of players joined Cardiff from Torquay, the most successful being goalkeeper Phil Joslin, winger Mike Tiddy and forward Tommy Northcott. However the relationship became sour after Cardiff allowed Harry Parfitt to join the Devon based side in the understanding they could have him back when required. In 1954 Cardiff offered £2500 to bring him back but Torquay demanded £5000. Despite the Torquay chairman willing to let him return to Cardiff for £2500 several members of the club's board decided to block the move until a higher price was agreed. Cardiff eventually paid the £5000 asking price but subsequently broke off ties with Torquay.

Spiers' replacement was his assistant Trevor Morris, a former player whose career had been ended by a broken leg in a wartime fixture for Cardiff. Under Morris, the team dropped into the lower half of the table in consecutive seasons before, in the 1956–57 season, they were relegated to the Second Division. After a disappointing season in the second tier, finishing 15th, Morris left the club. He later claimed that his position had been undermined by Merrett and the club's directors who continually interfered with first team matters during his tenure. Bill Jones was chosen as his replacement and one of his first moves was to sign Welsh international forward Derek Tapscott from Arsenal for £10,000. Tapscott finished as the club's top scorer in the following three seasons as Jones led the side to promotion back to the First Division in the 1959–60 season. However, they remained in the top tier for only two seasons before returning to the Second Division in 1962 after finishing in 21st position. Cardiff would not return to the top tier of English football for a further 52 years.
