= Riverside, Cardiff =

District and community in Cardiff, Wales

Coordinates: 51.479°N 3.189°W

Riverside
- Community
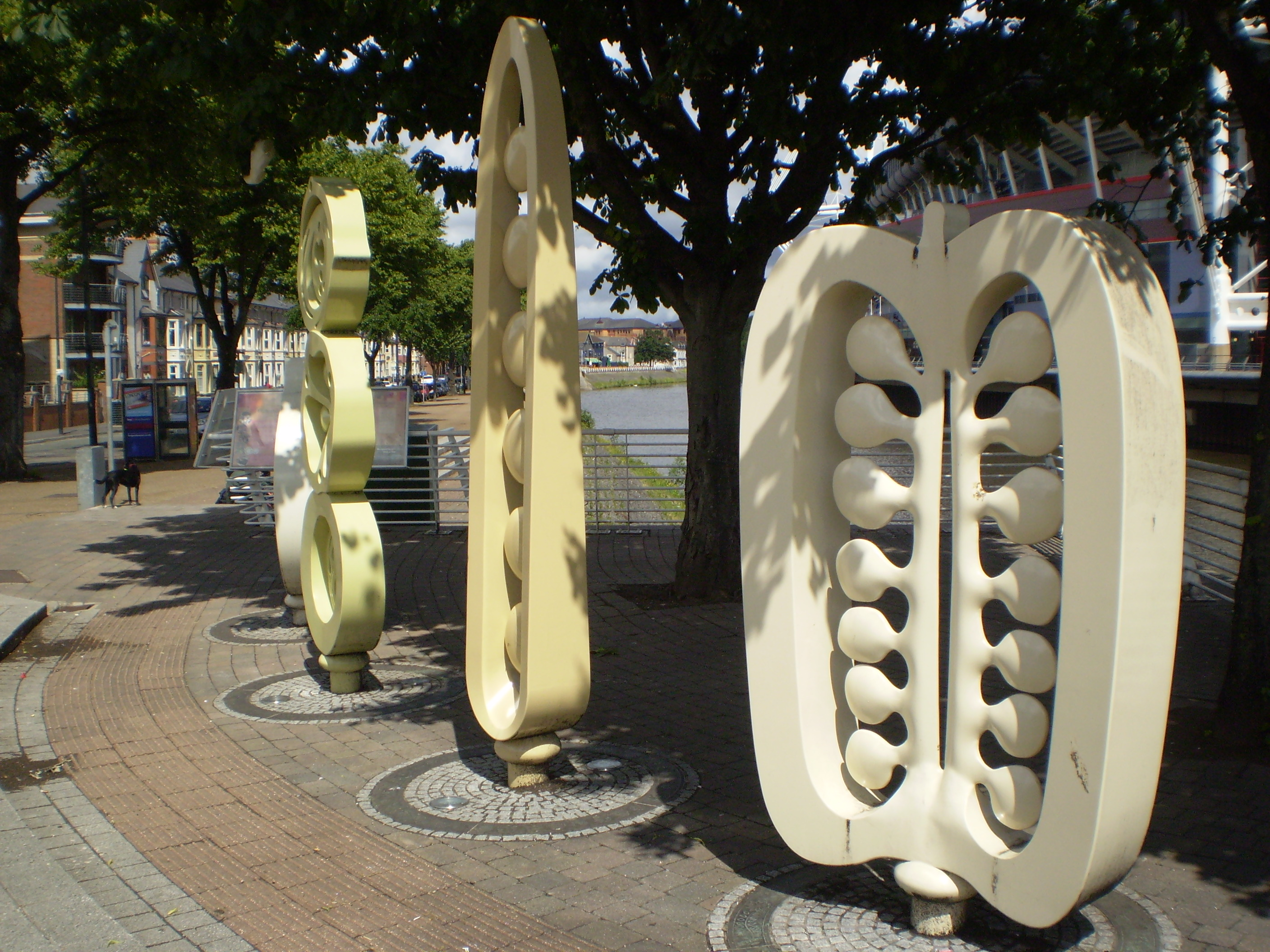
- Public art on Fitzhamon Embankment

- Location within Cardiff
- Principal area: Cardiff
- Country: Wales
- Sovereign state: United Kingdom
- Police: South Wales
- Fire: South Wales
- Ambulance: Welsh
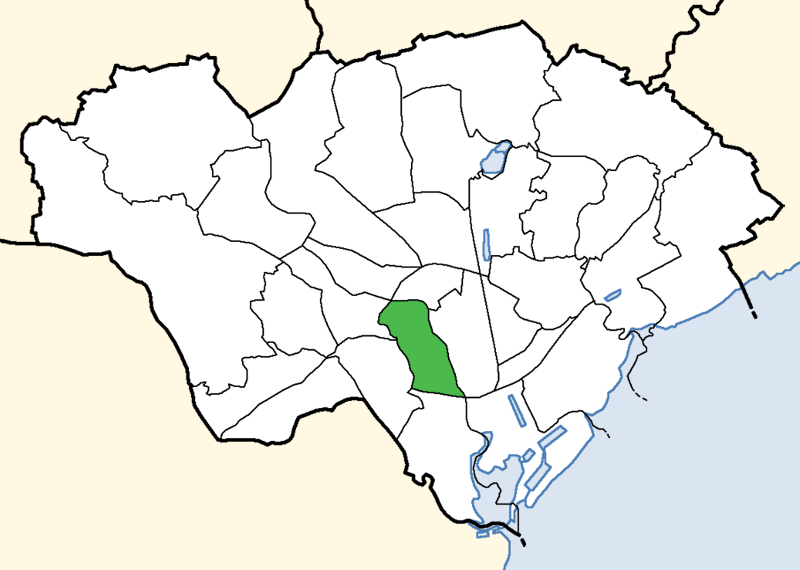
- List of places UK Wales Cardiff

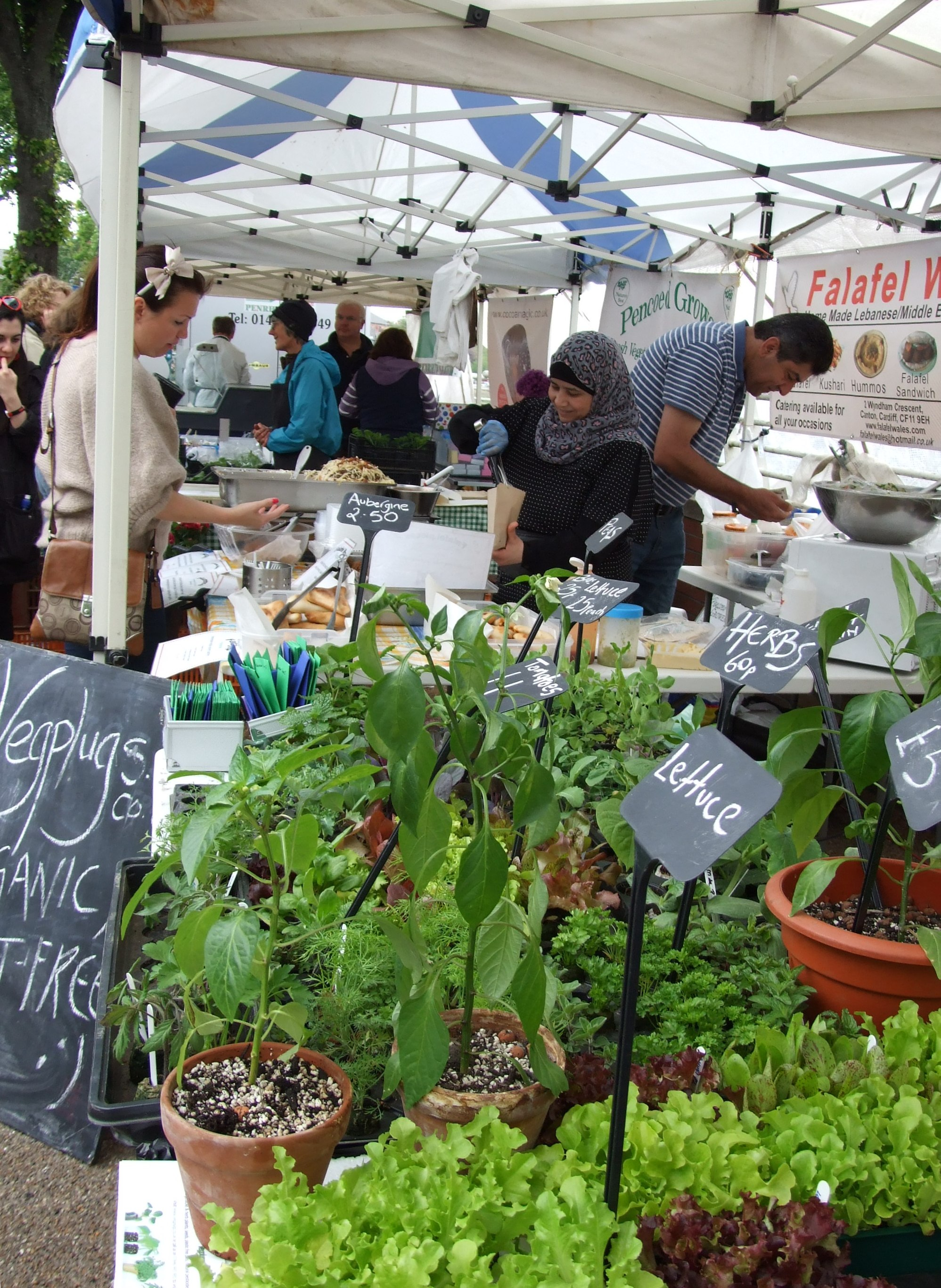
Riverside Real Food Market

Riverside (Welsh: Glan yr Afon) is an inner-city area and community of Cardiff, Wales, next to the River Taff. Riverside is also the name of the electoral ward, which includes the district of Pontcanna, to the north. The population of the community in 2011 was 13,771. Pontcanna was removed from the community in 2016.

== Description ==
Riverside consists mainly of terraced houses and until 2016 the community included the grand houses of Pontcanna and lining Cathedral Road. The area has a diverse population including Bangladeshi, Sikh and Chinese heritage, particularly to the south of Cowbridge Road and around Tudor Street.

Riverside has a number of Chinese, Halal, and Indian shops selling a range of foods. Because of its close proximity to the Principality Stadium and the city centre, Riverside has become a focus for Cardiff's rapidly expanding budget accommodation sector, with two backpacking hostels in close proximity of Fitzhamon Embankment.

In addition to the two public gardens in Riverside, Despenser Gardens and Clare Gardens, Riverside residents use Sophia Gardens immediately to the north. Sophia Gardens was once in Riverside, and was the first home ground of Cardiff City F.C., who in their early years were Riverside A.F.C.

== Welsh language ==
The 2011 census recorded that 1,475 people in the Riverside community could speak Welsh (13.7% of the population over three years old), a small rise on the 2001 census.

The former HTV television studios in nearby Pontcanna, which produced Welsh language programmes, was a boost to the language locally.

== Government ==
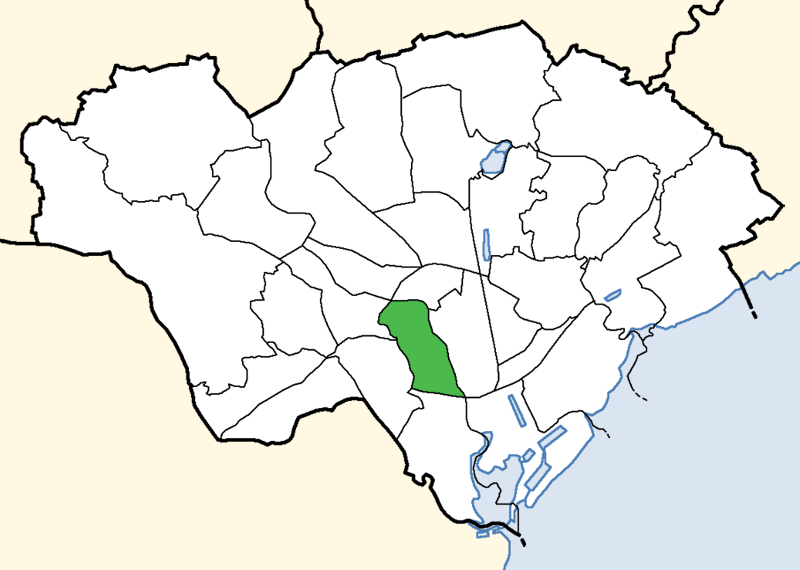
Riverside electoral ward of Cardiff

The Riverside electoral ward is in the parliamentary constituency of Cardiff West. It is bounded by the wards of Gabalfa to the north; Cathays to the east; Grangetown to the south; and Canton and Llandaff to the west.

Until 2016 the Riverside local government community included Pontcanna to the north, these districts now have separate community status. However, neither Riverside or Pontcanna have a community council.

== Local organisations ==
Riverside Real Food Market began as a Christmas Market in 1998 in a nearby park. The market moved to the wide pavement of Fitzhamon Embankment beside the River Taff, and has stalls from up to thirty retailers every Sunday.

== Notable people ==
- Geraint Jarman (1950 – 2025), musician, poet and television producer
- Ivor Novello (1893–1951), composer, singer and actor, born in a house on Cowbridge Road East
- Tessie O'Shea (1913–1995), entertainer, born in Plantagenet Street
