= History of Cardiff City F.C. =

Aspect of Welsh football history

The history of Cardiff City Football Club spans the period from 1899 to the present time. For detail on individual periods of the club's history, see one of the following articles:

- History of Cardiff City F.C. (1899–1962)
- History of Cardiff City F.C. (1962–present)
