= Alf Rowland =

English footballer

Personal information
- Full name: Alfred Rowland
- Date of birth: 2 September 1920
- Place of birth: Stokesley, England
- Date of death: 1997 (aged 76–77)
- Place of death: Stokesley, England
- Position: Defender

Senior career*
Years	Team	Apps	(Gls)
1946–1949	Aldershot	93	(0)
1949–1950	Cardiff City	3	(0)
- * Club domestic league appearances and goals

Alfred Rowland (2 September 1920 – 1997) was an English professional footballer who played as a defender. He made 96 appearances in the Football League during spells with Aldershot and Cardiff City.

== Early life ==
During World War II, Rowland served in the Middle East with the Green Howards. He was captured and served four years as a prisoner of war.

== Career ==
Following the end of World War II, Rowland began his professional career with Aldershot where he made 93 appearances in the Football League. In 1949, he signed for Cardiff City for a fee of £10,500, a club record for Aldershot. However, he struggled to establish himself in the first team at Cardiff, making only three appearances as injury cover for Fred Stansfield, before dropping out of professional football.
