= Ted Gorin =

Welsh footballer

Personal information
- Full name: Edward Rosser Gorin
- Date of birth: 2 March 1924
- Place of birth: Cardiff, Wales
- Date of death: 30 May 2013 (aged 89)
- Place of death: Cardiff, Wales
- Position: Forward

Senior career*
Years	Team	Apps	(Gls)
1948–1950	Cardiff City	6	(2)
1950–1951	Scunthorpe United	26	(12)
1951–1952	Shrewsbury Town	18	(3)
- * Club domestic league appearances and goals

Edward Rosser Gorin (2 March 1924 – 30 May 2013) was a Welsh professional footballer who played as a forward. After being spotted playing amateur football, he signed for Cardiff City in 1948 where he made his professional debut. He was sold to Scunthorpe United in 1950, and scored the club's first-ever goal in the Football League. He later joined Shrewsbury Town where he finished his professional career at the age of 27.

== Early life ==
Gorin was born in Cardiff, but was initially raised in Saundersfoot in West Wales. His family returned to Cardiff, settling in the Canton area of the city, and Gorin attended Grange National School and later Howard Garden's Grammar School. After leaving school, he worked as a print setter for the South Wales Echo and the Western Mail. During World War II, he was recruited to the Royal Corps of Signals.

== Career ==
After finishing his service, Gorin returned to his job with the Western Mail and began playing football for local amateur side Grange Albion. He finished as the club's top goalscorer for two consecutive seasons and his form prompted Football League Second Division side Cardiff City to sign him in October 1948. He made his professional debut for the club on 27 November 1948, playing in a 1–0 victory over Coventry City. He scored his first goal in his second appearance, a 2–2 draw with Leicester City on 11 December 1948, but only made two further appearances during the 1948–49 season, both coming in the Welsh Cup.

The following season, Gorin again struggled to break into the first team, making his first appearances of the season in consecutive 1–0 defeats to Barnsley and West Ham United in November 1949. He made three further appearances during the season, scoring in his final match for the club during a 1–1 draw with Hull City on the final day of the season.

He signed for Scunthorpe United, newly elected to the Football League, in July 1950 with manager Leslie Jones paying £2,500 to bring him to the club. After Scunthorpe drew their first match 0–0, Gorin scored the club's first goal in the Football League during a 2–1 defeat to Lincoln City in their second league match. A month later, he scored the club's first hat-trick in the Football League in a 3–0 victory over Accrington Stanley. He finished the season as the club's leading goalscorer but decided to move to Shrewsbury Town in order to be closer to Wales. However, following the death of his father, Gorin gave up playing at the age of 27 in order to return to Cardiff and care for his mother.

== Personal life ==
During his time playing for Cardiff, Gorin met his wife Blodwen Chapman. After moving to Scunthorpe, he was initially stopped from returning home but made an agreement with his manager that if he scored a hat-trick in a match against Accrington Stanley, he would be allowed to visit. Gorin duly obliged and was allowed to visit home after the game. The pair married in 1951.

He was also a keen baseball player, playing for local teams and representing Wales on two occasions, in 1951 and 1954.

After retiring from football, Gorin became the landlord of The Big Windsor pub in Cardiff. He later worked in the same role at the Bird In Hand pub, owned by Brains Brewery, the Gower Hotel and the Romilly. He suffered from dementia in later life and died on 30 May 2013 in Cardiff.
