= Ernie Marshall =

English footballer

Personal information
- Full name: Ernest Marshall
- Date of birth: 23 May 1918
- Place of birth: Dinnington, England
- Date of death: 1983 (aged 64–65)
- Place of death: Pwllheli, Wales
- Height: 5 ft 11 1/2 in (1.82 m)
- Position: Wing half

Senior career*
| Years | Team | Apps | (Gls) |
- Dinnington Athletic
| 1935–1939 | Sheffield United | 13 | (0) |
| 1939–1946 | Cardiff City | 1 | (0) |
- Yeovil Town
- * Club domestic league appearances and goals

Ernest Marshall (23 May 1918 — 1983) was an English professional footballer who played as a wing half. He made 14 appearances in the Football League during spells with Sheffield United and Cardiff City.

== Career ==
Marshall began his career with Dinnington Athletic before signing for Sheffield United in May 1935. He spent four years with the club, making thirteen league appearances, before leaving to join Cardiff City in May 1939. However, the outbreak of World War II saw competitive football suspended but the club held his registration while he served in the army. When the Football League resumed in 1946, Marshall returned to Cardiff and made his debut in a 2–1 victory over Notts County but was released without making another appearance. He later played non-league football with Yeovil Town.
