= Stan Parker =

English footballer

Stan Parker (31 May 1920 – 1994) was a professional footballer.

During his career he played as a centre forward for Ipswich Town for whom he was top scorer in their 1949–50 season.
