= Dave Blakey =

English footballer

Personal information
- Full name: David Blakey
- Date of birth: 22 August 1929
- Place of birth: Newburn, England
- Date of death: 4 April 2014 (aged 84)
- Position: Centre half

Youth career
- East Chevington Juniors

Senior career*
Years	Team	Apps	(Gls)
1947–1967	Chesterfield	617	(20)
- * Club domestic league appearances and goals

David Blakey (29 August 1929 – 4 April 2014) was an English professional footballer who played as a centre half. Blakey spent his entire senior career with Chesterfield. He is the club's record appearance holder, making 617 appearances in the Football League and 658 appearances in all competitions. After retiring as a player he worked as a scout at a number of clubs. He died on 4 April 2014.
