= Roger Ashton (footballer) =

Welsh footballer

Personal information
- Full name: Roger William Ashton
- Date of birth: 16 August 1921
- Place of birth: Llanidloes, Wales
- Date of death: July 1985 (aged 63)
- Place of death: Neath, Wales
- Position: Goalkeeper

Senior career*
Years	Team	Apps	(Gls)
1946–1948	Wrexham	0	(0)
1948–1949	Cardiff City	1	(0)
1949	Bath City	2	(0)
1949–1950	Newport County	10	(0)
1950	Merthyr Tydfil		
1950–1951	Newport County	1	(0)
- * Club domestic league appearances and goals

Roger William Ashton (16 August 1921 – July 1985) was a Welsh professional footballer who played as a goalkeeper. During his career, he made twelve appearances in The Football League during spells with Cardiff City and Newport County.

== Career ==
Ashton began his career with Wrexham following the return of The Football League at the end of World War II. However, he failed to break into the first team and was released in 1948 without making an appearance. He joined Cardiff City in April 1948 and, after impressing for their reserve side, he was handed his professional debut on the final day of the 1947–48 season. Replacing Danny Canning in goal, he played in a 2–1 defeat to Barnsley. The following season, he remained as backup to Canning's replacement Phil Joslin but struggled to make an impression and was released.

He joined non-league side Bath City soon after but returned to the Football League with Newport County in December 1949. He made ten league appearances for Newport before joining Merthyr Tydfil. He briefly returned to Newport the following season, making a single appearance before dropping out of professional football.
