= Eddie Chapman (footballer) =

English footballer (1923–2002)

Personal information
- Full name: Edwin Maude Chapman
- Date of birth: 3 August 1923
- Place of birth: East Ham, England
- Date of death: 6 October 2002 (aged 79)
- Place of death: Ilford, England
- Position: Inside forward

Youth career
- Loxford
- 1937–1942: West Ham United
- → Romford (loan)

Senior career*
| Years | Team | Apps | (Gls) |
| 1942–1949 | West Ham United | 7 | (3) |
- → Gillingham (guest)
- * Club domestic league appearances and goals

Edwin Maude Chapman (3 August 1923 – 6 October 2002) was an English football player and chairman, closely associated with West Ham United.

At schoolboy level, he won honours with Ilford and London, and also had a trial for England Schools. In 1937, his last season as a schoolboy, he scored 102 goals for his school team Loxford, and 128 in total, including a game that saw him score 12 goals, three games where he scored 9 goals, and 8 in another.

He first joined West Ham on 3 August 1937 as an office junior, earning 25 shillings a week plus 2/6d expenses. He trained with the team two or three afternoons a week, and went on to join Romford on loan to gain more experience. In an interview with Colin Benson, Chapman recalls one of his first experiences in the West Ham first team, in a war-time game against London rivals Arsenal. "I played outside right against Arsenal and it was truly a marvellous thing to be on the same field as the likes of George Swindin, Eddie Hapgood, the Compton brothers and the rest. I was 16 and scored in a convincing 6–0 win. What a day that was for me".

Chapman appeared in the second round second leg of the Football League War Cup in 1940, a 3–0 win over Leicester, and earned a 30/- (£1.50) match fee for the game. He was also in the squad for the final against Blackburn Rovers, but did not play.

He won a winners medal with the junior side in the London Junior Combination at the age of 19.

He was given a professional contract in September 1942 but, due to the war and his involvement with the Royal Engineers, he was not available to play for West Ham on a full-time basis until January 1947, although he competed in the Kent League for Gillingham while he was stationed at Chatham. While at Gillingham, he scored 9 goals in one week against Chelsea, and then 7 the next against the RAF. He made a total of 26 war-time appearances for West Ham, scoring 8 goals. He also played for the Royal Engineers All-England XI.

After the war, his opportunities in the West Ham first team were limited by the presence of players such as Eric Parsons, Terry Woodgate, Kenny Bainbridge and Harry Hooper, and were not helped by a persistent back injury. He scored his first league goal during his debut, a home game against Coventry City during the 1948–49 season. He made 1 FA Cup appearance against Luton on 8 January 1949. He played his last of 7 senior league games for West Ham the same season, having scored 3 goals for the club.

After leaving the playing staff, Chapman continued his involvement with the club's administrative affairs, and became West Ham's club secretary in 1956, following Frank Cearns' retirement. He was promoted to Chief Executive in 1980. In 1974 he was a recipient of the Football League Secretaries and Managers Association Long Service Award, and also the Canon League Loyalty Award in August 1984. He retired in the summer of 1986 after 49 years of service for the east London club. He returned to Gillingham in an advisory capacity less than a month after retiring, and made a dozen trips to the Priestfield Stadium to help advance the club's administrative systems and matchday organisation. His testimonial match between West Ham and Terry Venables' International IX took place on 9 August 1987. He died in 2002.
