= Jimmy Whitfield =

English footballer

Personal information
- Date of birth: 18 May 1919
- Place of birth: Hull, England
- Date of death: 1984 (aged 64–65)
- Position: Inside forward

Senior career*
Years	Team	Apps	(Gls)
- Humber United
1946–1949	Grimsby Town	29	(7)
1949–1951	Scunthorpe United (Note: Appearances and goals figures are for Football League games only.)	16	(6)
1951–1952	Southport	12	(0)
1952–1955	Scunthorpe United	104	(25)
1955–19??	Boston United		
1955–19??	Brigg Town		
1955–19??	Alford United		
- * Club domestic league appearances and goals

Jimmy Whitfield (18 May 1919 – 1984) was an English professional footballer who scored 38 goals from 161 appearances in the Football League playing as an inside forward for Grimsby Town, Scunthorpe United (in two separate spells) and Southport.

== Career ==
Whitfield was born in Hull. He began his career in the Football League with Grimsby Town, before joining Scunthorpe United, then playing in the Midland League, for a £900 fee in February 1949. He scored 29 goals in the club's last season in non-League football and played one season in the League before moving on to Southport in September 1951. After only five months, he returned to Scunthorpe, where he played regularly for two seasons, but at the end of the 1954–55 season he returned to non-League football with Boston United, Brigg Town and Alford United. He died in 1984.
