= History of Cardiff City F.C. (1962–present) =

Aspect of Welsh football history

Cardiff City Football Club is a professional association football club based in Cardiff, Wales. They are one of a few Welsh sides to play in the English football league system, rather than the Welsh system. The other teams are Swansea City, Newport County, Wrexham, and Merthyr Town.

== European competitions (1964–1985) ==
During the 1960s Cardiff began qualifying for European competition for the first time through the Welsh Cup. Their first ever match in European competition was in the European Cup Winners Cup during the 1964–65 season against Danish side Esbjerg fB, winning 1–0 on aggregate over the two legs, the only goal being scored by Peter King. They went on to reach the quarter-finals before being knocked out by Real Zaragoza. Despite their exploits in Europe, the club were still struggling in league competition under the stewardship of Jimmy Scoular, finishing in 20th position in Division Two. One high point at this time was the emergence of a 16-year-old striker named John Toshack who would go on to become an important part of the team for several years, along with his strike partner Brian Clark, before a high-profile switch to Liverpool.

Two years later the club would go on to reach the semi-final of the Cup Winners Cup, the furthest a second-division club has ever gone in European competition (together with Atalanta). Wins over Shamrock Rovers, NAC Breda, and Torpedo Moscow set up a tie with German side Hamburg, whose squad contained a number of German internationals in the likes of Uwe Seeler. After a 1–1 draw in the first leg, just over 43,000 fans turned out at Ninian Park to watch Hamburg triumph with a 3–2 victory. Despite their defeat, the cup provided inspiration for the side and they managed to finish in a more stable 13th position, with their strike partnership of Clark and Toshack finishing the season with 39 goals between them. Defeats against FC Porto and Göztepe saw them knocked out in the opening rounds of the tournament during the next two seasons.

At the start of the 1970–71 season the club paid £35,000 to sign midfielder Ian Gibson from Coventry City to provide support for Clark and Toshack up front, but the strikeforce was broken up three months later when Toshack was sold to Liverpool for £110,000. The club paid £40,000 to bring Alan Warboys in from Sheffield Wednesday as a replacement but missed out on promotion by finishing third. Although the sale of Toshack did hamper the progress of the team, the club did manage to reach the quarter-finals of the Cup Winners Cup where they faced Spanish giants Real Madrid. The first leg of the tie was held at Ninian Park where 47,000 fans watched one of the most famous victories in the club's history when Brian Clark headed in to give Cardiff a 1–0 win. Despite going out after losing the second leg 2–0 the result would still go down in the club's history. The club remained old Second Division except seasons of 1975–76 and 1982–83.

== Barren era (1985–2000) ==
Between 1985 and 1993, Cardiff were continuously in the lower two divisions of the league after being relegated to the Third Division. They were then relegated to the Fourth Division in 1985–86 season. They were promoted back to the Third Division in 1987–88 as runners-up. Two years later they dropped back into the Fourth Division. Cardiff won the new Division Three championship in 1993 but were relegated again two years later, and in 1996 finished in their lowest-ever league position – 22nd of 24 in Division Three, with only Scarborough and Torquay United below them. In 1996, Cardiff were exiled from playing in the Welsh Cup, which they had previously won 22 times, they were exiled along with all other Welsh clubs playing in the English League System. However, they did better during the 1996–97 season, finishing seventh (although they lost in the playoff semi-final), but suffered a setback and slipped into the bottom half of the table in 1998. They finished third in Division Three in 1999 and won automatic promotion to Division Two.

Cardiff struggled in Division Two throughout the 1999–2000 season and were relegated in 21st place. They finished Division Three runners-up the following season and have made impressive progress since then, helped by the investment of Lebanese businessman Sam Hammam.

== Revival and promotion (2000–2006) ==
Having sold his interests in Wimbledon, Sam Hammam purchased control of Cardiff City in August 2000, for a sum believed to be in the region of £11.5 million. Sam Hammam quickly picked up where he left off with the Crazy Gang. Shortly after taking over at Cardiff, Hammam controversially pledged to get the entire Welsh nation to support Cardiff by renaming the club "The Cardiff Celts" and changing the club colours to green, red and white. However, after lengthy talks with senior players and fans, Sam Hammam decided that the best policy was not to change the name of the club; however the club crest was redesigned. This new design incorporated the Cardiff City mascot Bartley the Bluebird, in front of the Flag of Saint David; and featured the Club's nickname superimposed at the top of the crest.

During the 2001–02 season, Cardiff took on Premier League contenders Leeds United in the FA Cup at Ninian Park. Cardiff came out 2–1 winners, Leeds scored the first through Australian international Mark Viduka, captain Graham Kavanagh equalised in the 21 minute with three minutes to Scott Young hit the back of the net sending Cardiff through to the fourth round where they lost to Tranmere Rovers. They finished 4th in the league but losing to Stoke City in the play-off semi-finals.

Lennie Lawrence guided Cardiff to promotion via a Division Two playoff triumph in 2003 against Queens Park Rangers Cardiff City finished in 6th position and played Bristol City in the Division Two playoff semi-finals. On 10 May 2003; Cardiff City beat Bristol City 1–0 on aggregate, having won the match at Ninian Park 1–0, and drawing the away leg 0–0 on 13 May 2003. Queens Park Rangers drew with Oldham Athletic away from home 1–1 on 10 May 2003, before claiming the advantage at Loftus Road on 14 May 2003; going through to the playoff final with a 2–1 aggregate victory.

On 25 May, the Millennium Stadium, in Cardiff, hosted one of the most unforgettable playoff finals in history. Both Cardiff City and Queens Park Rangers had been set up with defence minded formations. The game was comparatively scrappy with only occasional glimpses of class shown by both sides. However, after a nerve-wracking final, substitute Andy Campbell came off the bench to guide Cardiff past Queens Park Rangers with a spectacular lob after 114 minutes of play.

The former Middlesbrough striker, who had replaced Robert Earnshaw in the second half, shrugged off Danny Shittu and then calmly lobbed Chris Day, the Queens Park Rangers Goalkeeper to ensure Cardiff returned to Division One after an 18-year absence. Chances had been few and far between in normal time, but as both sets of players tired, the game opened up in those nail-biting final 30 minutes. No more so than when Day made a superb one-handed save from a Spencer Prior header after Graham Kavanagh's in-swinging free-kick.

The Bluebirds established themselves in Division One during 2003–04 season as they finished it off in an impressive 13th position. In the summer of 2004 they had to sell Robert Earnshaw for a fee of £3m to Norwich City, due to financial difficulties, Earnshaw was the club's second highest goalscorer with a total of 105 goals in 205 games. The follow season, they struggled to a 16th position finish, at the end of the 2004–05 campaign, Lawrence was relieved of his duties to make way for David Jones at the end of the campaign.

Jones improved the side by signing Darren Purse for £1m from West Bromwich Albion and naming him captain and bringing Welsh international Jason Koumas and Glenn Loovens on loan but due to the then continuing financial problems, they had to sell some big names such as Danny Gabbidon and James Collins to West Ham United for a combined fee of £3.5m and former captain, Graham Kavanagh to Wigan Athletic. But they still pulled off a successful season in the 2005–06 campaign finishing eleventh.

== Ridsdale era (2006–2009) ==
After failing to get the new stadium plans agreed by Cardiff Council due to concerns over financial security in 2006, Hammam agreed to a £27 million takeover by a consortium led by new chairman Peter Ridsdale and including the lead developer of the new stadia Paul Guy. However, the takeover was in doubt until 22 December 2006 with the club in threat of administration until the consortium agreed to pay Hammam's company Rudgwick an extra £500,000 and £90,000 to Hammam's brother. Ex-Wales rugby captain Mike Hall said after the deal was completed: "That was money which would have been spent on players. But instead it's gone into Sam's pocket. It was the only way the deal was going to be done. I know people say he's a complex character, but at the end it was total greed and self-interest. It was amazing, but football is a murky world." Cardiff finished the 2006–07 in 13th place, with not even a chance of promotion. During the summer of 2007 Cardiff signed some big names including Jimmy Floyd Hasselbaink and Robbie Fowler on free transfers whilst selling 2006–07 top goalscorer, Michael Chopra for £5m, this was their record transfer fee received. Hasselbaink and Fowler didn't prove that successful only scoring 15 goals between them and finished the league in 12th with 64 points. During the season Cardiff and Ridsdale were in constant battle with Langston over a £24m loan payment out of £31m, former owner, Sam Hammam was believed to be involved with Langston. However, Cardiff did reach the 2008 FA Cup Final, being beat by Premier League side Portsmouth.

Just before the Final, it had been rumoured that Cardiff could have a chance to qualify for the Europa League should they win the final. The FA stated that they would not nominate Cardiff a place in Europe should they earn one on the grounds that they wouldn't have an option. UEFA president, Michel Platini later pledged his support to the club if the FA denies them entry into the competition, saying "If England don't do anything, we will." Following Platini's statement the FA announced that they would be reviewing their stance on the situation. UEFA also commented on the possibility of the club being given a wild card entry into Europe, but the FA eventually backed down from their previous statement and confirmed that it would allow the club to play in Europe should they win the FA Cup final. However, Cardiff lost the FA Cup final 1–0 against Portsmouth, who hadn't already won a qualification place.

In the following 2008–09 season Cardiff made a serious attempt at getting promotion, finishing 7th losing out on a play-off spot through goals conceded. During the January transfer window they kept hold of star players, such as £2M rated Joe Ledley and added Quincy Owusu-Abeyie, Chris Burke and Michael Chopra to the side. However, £120,000 summer signing Ross McCormack proved that Cardiff had established a healthy tradition of discovering cut-price hidden goal-scoring gems, after selling Cameron Jerome to Birmingham City for £3m in 2006 and Michael Chopra sold to Sunderland for £5m in 2007. McCormack finished with 23 goals in 44 games. However this would be their last season at Ninian Park before they move to the Cardiff City Stadium, the last game at Ninian Park was a 3–0 loss to Ipswich Town.

Cardiff City had many fine players at their disposal at the start of the 21st century, including Robert Earnshaw, Jason Koumas, John Robinson, Graham Kavanagh, Danny Gabbidon, Michael Chopra and youth academy products Chris Gunter and Aaron Ramsey.

== Move to Cardiff City Stadium (2009–10) ==
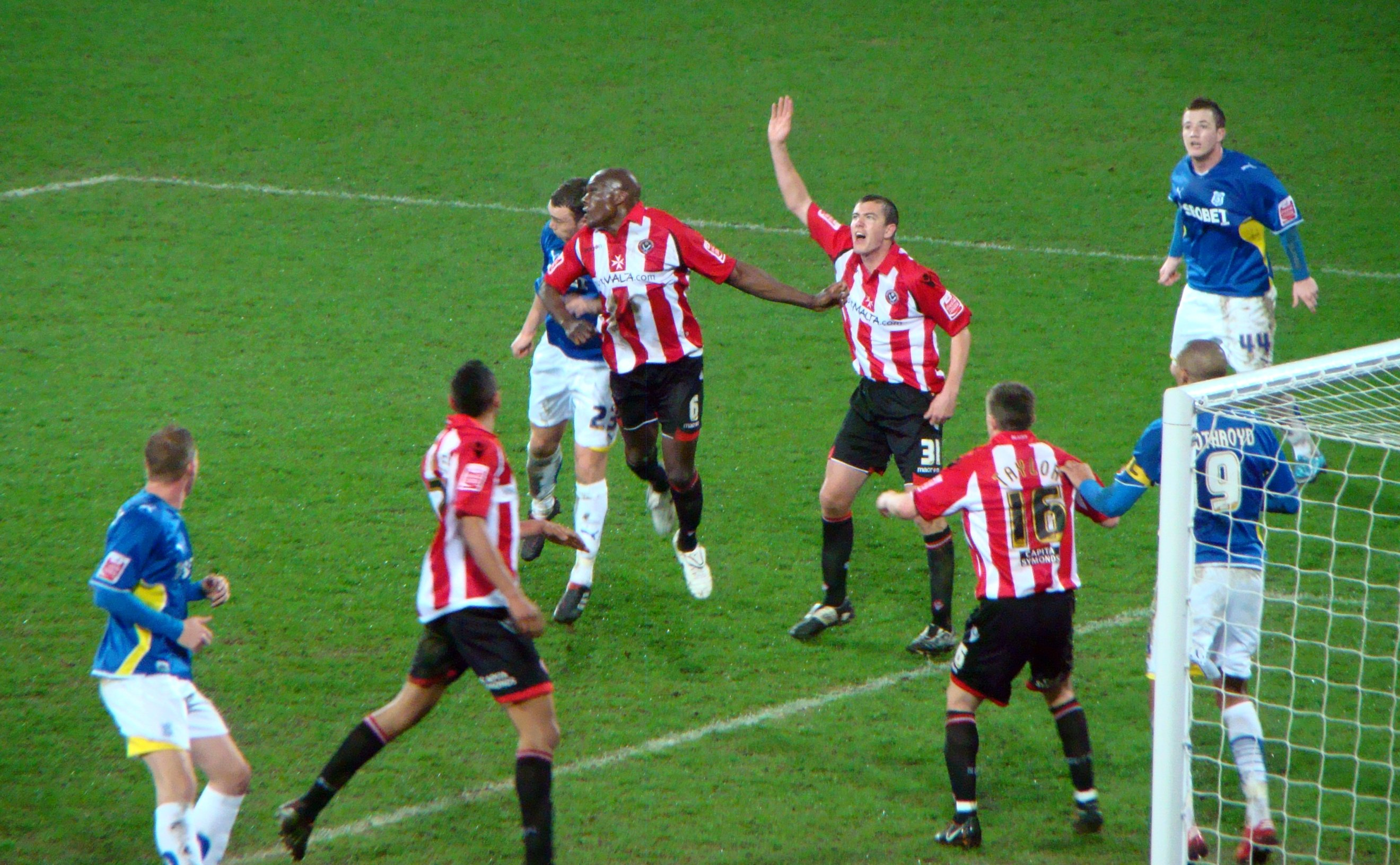
Cardiff City playing against Sheffield United during the 2009–10 season

Before the 2009–10 season, Ridsdale travelled to the Far East to try to get a business deal which he promised would see Cardiff's debt problem dealt with, and creation of an academy in the Far East. No investment was forthcoming, but Malaysian businessman Dato' Chan Tien Ghee was an addition to the club's board. Cardiff then broke their current record transfer fee, signing Michael Chopra from Sunderland for £3m. The transfer fee dwarfed their previous record of £1.75m for Peter Thorne from Stoke City in 2001. Cardiff moved across the road to their new £50m stadium, Cardiff City Stadium for the 2009–10 season. The first game was played on 10 July 2010 against Chasetown but it was officially opened on 22 July, Cardiff played Scottish giants Celtic. 15,000 spectators watched the goalless draw.

Having staved off a winding up order from HMRC under a payment agreement, in November 2009. Ridsdale offered a "Golden Ticket" scheme to fans, in that if they bought their 2010/11 season ticket before January 6, 2010, then they would not see a rise on prices for two years, and all monies raised would be spent on players in the January 2010 transfer window. However, on 27 January 2010, Ridsdale admitted he was eating humble pie, and that in addition to the "Golden Ticket" money not being spent on players, club assets would be sold to fulfil a £2.7M tax bill, and avert another winding up order.

Cardiff City drew the most successful graphic at Championship in 2009–10 season and qualified for the Play-Offs after beating Queens Park Rangers 1–0. In the play-off semi-final, they met Leicester City. Cardiff advanced to the play-off final after winning 4–3 on penalties following a 3–3 aggregate score over two legs. However, in the play-off final against Blackpool, they lost 3–2 after leading twice in the game.

== Malaysian era and Premiership Football (2010–) ==
Malaysian business men Datuk Chan Tien Ghee and Tan Sri Vincent Tan Chee Yioun took over the club on 27 May 2010. Chan confirmed that Dave Jones will continue as the Cardiff City manager on 25 May. A transfer embargo was imposed due to tax problems worth £1.3m and not submitting their year-end accounts for May 2009, which was paid off on 8 July. However the embargo wasn't lifted till 8 August due to the year-end accounts still not being submitted. On 17 August, Cardiff signed Wales captain Craig Bellamy on a season long loan from Manchester City, with the financial side being backed by the new owners. However, the club faced another potential winding-up order after it was revealed that around £175,000 was still owed to Motherwell relating to the transfer of Paul Quinn. However, since Motherwell revealed the outstanding payment, Cardiff paid off half the amount owed and paid off the rest immediately. On 14 November 2010, Jay Bothroyd was called up for England to play France at Wembley Stadium on 17 November. Bothroyd came on in 74th minute to become Cardiff's first player to play for England in their 111-year history. Cardiff were within reach of an automatic place throughout the season, but failed to do so and ended in the play-offs for a second season. Cardiff then lost to Reading in the semi-finals, meaning a second failed play-off campaign, this result lead to Dave Jones being sacked on 30 May 2011.

On 3 June 2011, Cardiff City had reached an agreement with long term debtors, PMG, as part of the agreement some of the debt would be turned into shares and Mike Hall would rejoin the board. On 17 June, former Watford manager, Malky Mackay joined on a three-year deal, Watford were paid an undisclosed fee for his services. In his first season, Mackay lead the team to a successful League Cup run in which the club reached its first ever final in the competition, where they lost to Liverpool on penalties. Cardiff ended their season in the play-off positions, for the third season running, however they failed for the third time losing to West Ham United in the semi-finals.

Following the play-off defeat, the Malaysian owners were planning to change the colours and badge of the club but these plans were soon ended because of a bad reaction from the fans as a result, the investment plan was to be rethought. After a business meeting on 5 June, Cardiff announced the following day, that they would be playing in red at home and blue away, and have a new club crest with a dragon replacing the prominent Bluebird, which became smaller in size. As a result of this investment was to placed by the Malaysian and the long historical debt of Langston was to be paid off, along with a new training facility and stadium expansion to go with it. Cardiff offered former chairman Sam Hammam three offers which would all add up to a total of £13m plus a life presidency role at the club, which would help towards paying off the Langston debt, however Hammam decided to reject all three offers on 29 June. Cardiff had their best ever start to a league campaign in history during the 2012–13 season, Malky Mackay's men also set a new club record by winning their 10th consecutive home match against former manager, Dave Jones', Sheffield Wednesday side. However, Cardiff couldn't manage to extend this record following a 2–1 loss to Peterborough United, where they also broke the record attendance at Cardiff City Stadium, now set at 26,073. Cardiff gained promotion to the Premier League on 16 April 2013, following a goalless draw against Charlton Athletic, ending a 51-year absence from the top division and followed this by winning the title 5 days later after drawing with Burnley.

Cardiff's debut season in the Premier League started with some big spending, where they broke the transfer record of £4 million when they signed Danish international Andreas Cornelius for £7.5 million. The transfer record was broke two more times over the summer, with signings of English international Steven Caulker and Chilean international Gary Medel. In July, Vincent Tan had reached an agreement with Sam Hammam over the £15 million debt owed to Langston, where Hammam would become Honorary Life President of the club, this was considered as the first step of becoming a debt-free club. Cardiff went on to win the first ever Premier League South Wales derby against Swansea City. Following a 3–0 loss to Southampton, Mackay was sacked with the club only 1 point away from the relegation places.

On 2 January 2014, former Manchester United striker Ole Gunnar Solskjær was confirmed as first team manager, becoming the first foreign manager to take charge of the team. Despite the change in management, Solskjær failed to save the club from relegation meaning an instant return to the Championship 12 months after winning promotion, following a 3–0 defeat to Newcastle. The two teams that were promoted alongside Cardiff, Hull City and Crystal Palace, who finished 2nd and 5th respectively, both managed to preserve their top flight status.

Cardiff returned to the Championship after one season of Premier League football. Despite possessing an abundance of talent and being one of the favourites for promotion back into England's top division, Cardiff's performances during the season were disappointing. Ole Gunnar Solskjaer was sacked on 18 September 2014, following 8 torrid months in charge. Despite being linked with managers such as Neil Lennon and Paul Hartley, Cardiff appointed Leyton Orient manager Russell Slade on 6 October 2014. Slade started off his managerial career well with a 2–1 home victory over a then unbeaten Nottingham Forest. Despite his early victory and decent home form, Slade's team selection's and style of football upset fans due to the high expectations of an immediate return to the Premier League. Following a pattern of the last few seasons, Cardiff's fans were troubled off the pitch as well as on it. Vincent Tan's rebrand remained the focal point on match days, with many organised protests and chants directly aimed at the owner. On 2 January 2015, Cardiff beat League One strugglers Colchester United 3–1 in the FA Cup in front of the lowest ever recorded crowd of 4,194 at the Cardiff City Stadium which prompted an emergency meeting of the Cardiff Board. On 9 January 2015, the club announced an official statement that after deliberation with members of the board and chosen fans, the club's home colours would be changed back to blue with immediate effect. The following day, Cardiff welcomed Fulham to the Cardiff City Stadium which resulted in the Bluebirds winning 1–0. The change back to blue was seen as a success for fans and protesters alike, however, attendances had been dropping steadily throughout the season by an average of 7,000 per game compared to the previous season, with many fans unhappy with the day-to-day operations of the club, poor performances and future plans. On 6 April 2015, Slade suffered his worst home defeat as Cardiff manager following a 3–0 loss against fellow Championship strugglers Bolton Wanderers, thus increasing the pressure on his position. Cardiff finished the 2014–15 season with 62 points and in 11th place, their lowest season finish since the 2007–08 season.

Cardiff missed out on a play-off place for the following season, whilst also having a transfer embargo enforced on them, for breaching Financial Fair Play Rules, Meaning that Cardiff had to loan out Kenwyne Jones for a second season and sell top goal-scorer Joe Mason to Championship rivals, Wolverhampton Wanderers. Despite the embargo, Cardiff were able to settle the long term debt with creditor Langston, and Vincent Tan had written off £10 million worth of debt and promised to turn £68 million into equity. Slade was promoted to Head of Football at the club, eventually being replaced by Paul Trollope, a member of his coaching staff. Cardiff struggled under Trollope, only managing 2 wins out of 12 games and found themselves fighting in the relegation places, the first time in 11 years. Trollope was sacked on 4 October, and was replaced by Neil Warnock. Warnock brought Cardiff out of the relegation zone to finish in 12th. The following season, Cardiff began brightly winning their first five games of the season, for the first time in their history, before eventually being promoted in 2nd place following a 0–0 draw with Reading, where they broke their attendance record at Cardiff City Stadium.

Following the promotion, Vincent Tan converted a further £66.4 million owed to him into equity. As Cardiff struggled to score goals during the season, the club broke their transfer record previously set in 2013, with the signing of Emiliano Sala for a reported fee of £15 million from FC Nantes on 19 January. However, two days later the Piper PA-46 Malibu light aircraft transporting Sala crashed off Alderney, in the channel islands whilst traveling from Nantes to Cardiff. The aircraft was found 13 days later and Sala was confirmed dead on 7 February. Cardiff were relegated back to the EFL Championship on 4 May, following a 3–2 loss to Crystal Palace.

== References and notes ==
- "1920–1947 GREAT DAYS, LOWS & RECOVERY". cardiffcityfc.co.uk. Cardiff City F.C. 21 March 2013. Archived from the original on 26 June 2016.
- "1947–1964 POST-WAR RECOVERY". cardiffcityfc.co.uk. Cardiff City F.C. 21 March 2013. Archived from the original on 30 May 2016.
- "1964–1973 THE SCOULAR YEARS". cardiffcityfc.co.uk. Cardiff City F.C. 21 March 2013. Archived from the original on 30 October 2013.
- "1974–1989 FRIDAY FAME & 80s PAIN". cardiffcityfc.co.uk. Cardiff City F.C. 21 March 2013. Archived from the original on 27 June 2016.
- "1989–1999 FROM DARKNESS INTO LIGHT?". cardiffcityfc.co.uk. Cardiff City F.C. 21 March 2013. Archived from the original on 18 August 2016.
- "2000–2010 IGNITION & PROGRESSION". Cardiff City F.C. 21 March 2013.
