= Reg Parker (footballer) =

Welsh footballer

Personal information
- Full name: Reginald Ernest Arundel Parker
- Date of birth: 10 June 1921
- Place of birth: Llantrisant, Wales
- Date of death: 1997 (aged 75–76)
- Position: Centre-forward

Senior career*
Years	Team	Apps	(Gls)
1947–1948	Cardiff City	2	(0)
1948–1954	Newport County	201	(99)
- * Club domestic league appearances and goals

Reginald Ernest Arundel Parker (10 June 1921 – 1997) was a Welsh professional footballer.

== Career ==
A centre-forward, Parker began his career at Cardiff City, playing for the side in wartime fixtures. Parker later went on to serve in World War II before returning to Ninian Park on his return, where he was unable to force his way past Stan Richards and made just two appearances at the end of the 1947–48 season.

In August 1948, he joined Newport County in exchange for Bryn Allen, going on to make 201 appearances for the side between 1948 and 1954, scoring 99 goals.
