= Ken Moody =

English footballer

Personal information
- Full name: Kenneth George Moody
- Date of birth: 12 November 1924
- Place of birth: Grimsby, England
- Date of death: 1990 (aged 65–66)
- Position: Full-back

Senior career*
Years	Team	Apps	(Gls)
1941–1943	Humber United		
1943–1951	Grimsby Town	114	(0)
1951–195?	Peterborough United		
- * Club domestic league appearances and goals

Kenneth George Moody (12 November 1924 – 1990) was an English professional footballer who played as a full-back.
