= Harry May (footballer) =

British footballer (1928–2007)

Personal information
- Full name: Harry May
- Date of birth: 15 October 1928
- Place of birth: Glasgow, Scotland
- Date of death: 9 July 2007 (aged 78)
- Place of death: Frampton on Severn, England
- Position: Full back

Youth career
- Thorniewood United

Senior career*
Years	Team	Apps	(Gls)
1948–1950	Cardiff City	1	(0)
1950–1952	Swindon Town	78	(1)
1952–1955	Barnsley	105	(0)
1955–1956	Southend United	19	(0)
- * Club domestic league appearances and goals

Harry May (15 October 1928 – 9 July 2007) was an English professional footballer who played as a full back. He made over 200 appearances in the Football League.

== Career ==
May began his career with Scottish junior side Thorniewood United before signing for Cardiff City in 1948. Although he played as a full back, he made his professional debut as a forward during an injury crisis in a 1–0 defeat to Leicester City. However, it proved to be his only league appearance for the club and he was allowed to join Swindon Town in 1950.

At Swindon, he was able to establish himself in the first team and made 78 league appearances during a two-year spell before moving to Barnsley. May was ever present for Barnsley as they won the Third Division North title during the 1954–55 season, playing in every league match. However, a dispute over wages eventually led him to leave the club in 1955, finishing his professional career with Southend United. he once ticked my nan a pack of super kings, solid kid to be fair
