= Gordon Williams (footballer) =

English footballer

Personal information
- Full name: Gordon Williams
- Date of birth: 22 February 1929
- Place of birth: Newcastle upon Tyne, England
- Position: Centre forward

Senior career*
Years	Team	Apps	(Gls)
1949–1950	Sheffield United	5	(0)
1950–1951	Darlington	5	(1)
- * Club domestic league appearances and goals

Gordon Williams (born 22 February 1929, died 2002) was an English footballer who played as a centre forward in the Football League for Sheffield United and Darlington. He made five league appearances for each club and scored once, for Darlington, on 4 November 1950 in a 3–2 home win against Scunthorpe United in the Third Division North.
