= Gordon Pembery =

Welsh footballer

Personal information
- Full name: Gordon Dennis Pembery
- Date of birth: 10 October 1926
- Place of birth: Cardiff, Wales
- Date of death: 12 March 2013 (aged 86)
- Place of death: Swindon, England
- Position: Wing half

Senior career*
| Years | Team | Apps | (Gls) |
| 1946–1947 | Norwich City | 1 | (0) |
| 1949–1950 | Cardiff City | 1 | (0) |
| 1950–1952 | Torquay United | 51 | (7) |
| 1952–1956 | Charlton Athletic | 18 | (1) |
| 1956–1957 | Swindon Town | 37 | (2) |
| 1957–1958 | Headington United | | |
| Total | | 108 | (10) |
- * Club domestic league appearances and goals

Gordon Dennis Pembery (10 October 1926 – 12 March 2013) was a Welsh footballer who played as a wing half in the Football League. He was born in Cardiff, Glamorganshire, Wales.
