= Seamus MacBennett =

Northern Ireland footballer

Personal information
- Full name: James Congall MacBennett
- Date of birth: 16 November 1925
- Place of birth: Newcastle, Northern Ireland
- Date of death: 23 February 1995 (aged 69)
- Place of death: Lambeth, England
- Position: Winger

Youth career
- Belfast Celtic

Senior career*
Years	Team	Apps	(Gls)
1947–1948	Cardiff City	4	(2)
1948–1950	Tranmere Rovers	12	(1)
1951	Margate	6	(1)
- Chelmsford City
- * Club domestic league appearances and goals

James Congall MacBennett (16 November 1925 – 23 February 1995) was a footballer, who played as a winger in the Football League for Cardiff City and Tranmere Rovers.
