= Ken Wright (footballer) =

English footballer (1922–1994)

Personal information
- Full name: Kenneth Laurence Wright
- Date of birth: 16 May 1922
- Place of birth: Newmarket, Suffolk, England
- Date of death: 6 June 1994 (aged 72)
- Place of death: Stratford-on-Avon, Warwickshire, England
- Position: Inside forward

Senior career*
Years	Team	Apps	(Gls)
- Cambridge Town
1943–1945	West Ham United (wartime)		
1946–1949	West Ham United	51	(20)
- * Club domestic league appearances and goals

Kenneth Lawrence Wright (16 May 1922 – 6 June 1994) was an English footballer who played as an inside-forward in the Football League for West Ham United.

As an amateur, Wright played for Cambridge Town. He served with the Royal Air Force during World War II where he rose to the rank of Flight Lieutenant and was awarded the Distinguished Flying Cross.

He played wartime football for West Ham United, making seven appearances in the Football League South between 1943 and 1945 (including a return of five goal in five games in the 1945–46 season). He signed professional forms with the east London club in 1946, making his official debut on 7 September 1946 in a 0–2 home defeat against Leicester City.

He played for the Hammers for three seasons before leaving in 1949. He was the club's top scorer for the 1948–49 season with 11 goals. His overall tally for West Ham was 25 goals in 59 games.

He later rejoined the RAF after a knee injury forced his retirement from football, becoming an instructor with Bomber Command.
