= Bill Hullett =

English footballer

Personal information
- Full name: William Alexander Hullett
- Date of birth: 19 December 1915
- Place of birth: Liverpool, England
- Date of death: 1982 (aged 66–67)
- Height: 5 ft 10 in (1.78 m)
- Position: Forward

Senior career*
Years	Team	Apps	(Gls)
1935	Everton	0	(0)
1936	New Brighton	13	(8)
1936	Everton	0	(0)
1937–1938	Plymouth Argyle	29	(20)
1939	Manchester United	0	(0)
–1945-47	Merthyr Tydfil	??	
1947–1948	Cardiff City	27	(15)
1948	Nottingham Forest	13	(2)
–1950-	Merthyr Tydfil	??	(146)
–	Worcester City	??	
- * Club domestic league appearances and goals

William Alexander Hullett (19 December 1915 - 1982) was a professional footballer who played in the Football League for New Brighton, Plymouth Argyle, Cardiff City and Nottingham Forest.
