= Bernard Ross =

Welsh footballer

Personal information
- Full name: William Bernard Ross
- Date of birth: 8 November 1924
- Place of birth: Swansea, Wales
- Date of death: 20 February 1999 (aged 74)
- Place of death: Bangor, Gwynedd, Wales
- Position: Outside forward

Senior career*
Years	Team	Apps	(Gls)
1943–1948	Cardiff City	8	(2)
1948–1949	Sheffield United	3	(1)
1949–1951	Southport	47	(13)
- * Club domestic league appearances and goals

William Bernard Ross (8 November 1924 – 20 February 1999) is a Welsh former professional footballer who played as an outside forward. He made over 50 appearances in the Football League during spells with Cardiff City, Sheffield United and Southport.

== Career ==
Ross began his career playing local amateur football in his hometown Swansea, before joining Cardiff City during World War II. When the Football League resumed in 1946, he made his professional debut in a 2–0 victory over Exeter City. In his following appearance, he scored his first senior goals with a brace during a 3–2 victory over Queens Park Rangers.

The club won promotion to the Second Division but Ross struggled for playing time at the higher level and was sold to Sheffield United soon after. However, he made only three league appearances for Sheffield before joining Southport where he enjoyed a more successful spell, making over 50 appearances in all competitions before dropping out of professional football in 1951.
