= Billy James (Welsh footballer) =

Welsh footballer

Personal information
- Full name: William John James
- Date of birth: 18 October 1921
- Place of birth: Cardiff, Wales
- Date of death: 27 July 1980 (aged 58)
- Place of death: Cardiff, Wales
- Position: Forward

Senior career*
Years	Team	Apps	(Gls)
1946–1947	Cardiff City	6	(3)
- * Club domestic league appearances and goals

William John James (18 October 1921 – 27 July 1980) was a Welsh professional footballer. During his career, he represented Wales at amateur level during wartime competitions and played six times in the Football League for Cardiff City before being forced to retire due to the physical effects of his time spent as a prisoner of war during the Second World War.

== Career ==
Born in Cardiff, James was raised in the Splott area of the city, living in Carlisle Street. He joined his hometown club Cardiff City in 1939 at the start of the Second World War. A prolific scorer for the club during wartime fixtures, he was regarded as an exciting prospect in Welsh football and was chosen to represent Wales in two wartime fixtures against England, scoring in the first match where he played against Stan Cullis. At the age of 18, James enlisted in the army, joining the 77th HAA Regiment, Royal Artillery. The unit contained a number of footballers including other Cardiff City players Ernie Curtis and Billy Baker and embarked on a journey to North Africa by ship for deployment. However, en route, Japanese forces launched attacks on Hong Kong, Singapore and Malaya leading the UK to declare war against Japan which saw James and his unit rerouted to the Dutch colony of Java in the Dutch East Indies where British forces suffered heavy losses and James was one of numerous British troops taken prisoner.

He spent three years in a Japanese prisoner-of-war camp before returning to Britain at the end of the war. He resumed playing for Cardiff City in the 1946–47 season, scoring in his first two matches in the Football League, a 2–1 defeat to Notts County and a 2–0 victory over Bournemouth. However, his time in the POW camp had seen James suffer from severe malnutrition and the effects had resulted in irreparable damage to his eyesight and he was forced into retirement at the end of the season. The club held a benefit game for James in May 1950 and he later returned to work for the club as a scout.

== Career statistics ==
Club	Season	League			FA Cup		League Cup		Other		Total	
Club	Season	Division	Apps	Goals	Apps	Goals	Apps	Goals	Apps	Goals	Apps	Goals
Cardiff City	1946–47	Third Division South	6	3	0	0	0	0	1 (Note: Appearance in the Welsh Cup.)	1	7	4
Total			6	3	0	0	0	0	1	1	7	4
