= Billy Rees =

Welsh footballer

Personal information
- Full name: William Rees
- Date of birth: 10 March 1924
- Place of birth: Blaengarw, Wales
- Date of death: 27 July 1996 (aged 72)
- Place of death: Bridgend, Wales
- Height: 5 ft 11 in (1.80 m)
- Position: Inside forward

Senior career*
Years	Team	Apps	(Gls)
1944–1949	Cardiff City	101	(33)
1949–1950	Tottenham Hotspur	11	(3)
1950–1956	Leyton Orient	184	(58)
1956–1959	Headington United	122	(58)
1959–1960	Kettering Town	?	(?)

International career
1949–1950	Wales	4	(0)
- * Club domestic league appearances and goals

William Rees (10 March 1924 – 27 July 1996) was a Welsh professional footballer and Wales international.

== Career ==
Rees was born in Pwllcarn Terrace, Blaengarw. He had been working as a coal miner while playing amateur football for Carn Rovers when he was spotted by Cardiff City manager Cyril Spiers. He made eighty-three appearances in wartime fixtures for the club, scoring seventy-four times, as well as appearing in a wartime international for Wales against England in May 1945. With the Football League returning following the end of the war Rees became a major part of the side, helping them to promotion in the first season. He finished as top scorer the following year but at the end of the 1948-49 season his good form saw Tottenham Hotspur take him to London for £14,000, just weeks after winning the first of his four Wales caps against Northern Ireland.

Early into his Tottenham career he suffered from a number of minor injuries which caused his form to severely dip and he found himself out of the side. He was quickly sold to Leyton Orient at the end of the season for £14,500. He managed to return to form with Orient and spent six years at the club before ending his career with spells at non-league sides Headington United and Kettering Town.

Following his retirement from football he worked as a plant operator before later joining a pharmaceutical company based in Bridgend whilst living in nearby Llangeinor.
