= Arthur Lever (footballer) =

Welsh footballer

Personal information
- Full name: Arthur Richard Lever
- Date of birth: 25 March 1920
- Place of birth: Cardiff, Wales
- Date of death: 20 August 2004 (aged 84)
- Place of death: Cardiff, Wales
- Position: Defender

Senior career*
Years	Team	Apps	(Gls)
1946–1950	Cardiff City	156	(9)
1950–1954	Leicester City	119	(0)
1954–1957	Newport County	72	(0)

International career
1952	Wales	1	(0)
- * Club domestic league appearances and goals

Arthur Richard Lever (25 March 1920 – 20 August 2004), nicknamed "Buller", was a Welsh professional footballer and Wales international.

== Career ==
Born in Cardiff, Lever joined his hometown club Cardiff City at the age of twenty-two in 1942 having played amateur football. He went on to play over one hundred wartime fixtures for the club before making his league debut during the 1946–1947 season against Norwich City. He was ever present for the club in his first season and went on to play in one hundred and fourteen consecutive league games for the club, the run ending in March 1949 when he was injured in a match against Tottenham Hotspur.

In September 1950 he joined Leicester City for a fee of £17,000, eventually going on to become club captain. He spent four years at Filbert Street before returning to South Wales to play for Newport County until his retirement from football in 1957 due to an Achilles tendon problem.

During his career Lever won just one cap for Wales when he played against Scotland at Ninian Park in 1952. However it is widely believed he could have won more caps had he played in a different period as during his career Wales had numerous top level full backs.

Lever was well known as being a sporting all-rounder during his life and played numerous sports at different levels, including Baseball, Basketball, Cricket and Golf. He died on 20 August 2004 after spending a short time at a nursing home in Cardiff. He is buried in Thornhill, Cardiff.
