= George Wardle (footballer) =

English footballer

Personal information
- Full name: George Wardle
- Date of birth: 24 September 1919
- Place of birth: Kibblesworth, County Durham, England
- Date of death: November 1991 (aged 72)
- Place of death: Kimblesworth, County Durham, England
- Positions: Wing half; outside forward

Youth career
- Durham B.C.

Senior career*
Years	Team	Apps	(Gls)
1937–1939	Middlesbrough	1	(0)
1939–1947	Exeter City	38	(6)
1942–1943	→ Lincoln City (wartime guest)		
1944–1945	→ Chelsea (wartime guest)		
1947–1949	Cardiff City	40	(11)
1949–1951	Queens Park Rangers	53	(4)
1951–1954	Darlington	95	(6)
- * Club domestic league appearances and goals

George Wardle (24 September 1919 – November 1991) was an English footballer who scored 27 goals from 227 appearances in the Football League playing for Middlesbrough, Exeter City, Cardiff City, Queens Park Rangers and Darlington either side of the Second World War. He played as a wing half or outside forward. He guested for clubs including Chelsea and Lincoln City during the war.

Wardle then went into coaching, first with Crook Town and then with Middlesbrough's youth teams. In his book Walk Alone, former Middlesbrough and Liverpool midfielder Craig Johnston credited Wardle with saving his career by supporting him when other members of the Middlesbrough coaching team wanted to let the young Australian go.
