= Bryn Allen =

Welsh footballer

Personal information
- Full name: Brynley William Allen
- Date of birth: 23 March 1921
- Place of birth: Gilfach Goch, Wales
- Date of death: 21 July 2005 (aged 84)
- Place of death: Gilfach Goch, Wales
- Height: 5 ft 9 in (1.75 m)
- Position: Inside left

Youth career
- Gilfach Welfare

Senior career*
Years	Team	Apps	(Gls)
1937–1939	Swansea Town	0	(0)
1945–1947	Cardiff City	41	(18)
1947–1948	Newport County	17	(12)
1948–1949	Cardiff City	17	(4)
1949–1950	Reading	26	(12)
1950–1952	Coventry City	88	(26)
1952–1953	Merthyr Tydfil		
1953	Hereford United		
1953–1957	Barry Town	178	(57)
- Haverfordwest Athletic

International career
1950	Wales	2	(0)
- * Club domestic league appearances and goals

Brynley William Allen (23 March 1921 – 21 July 2005) was a Welsh professional footballer who played as an inside forward for various clubs in the 1940s and 1950s and made two appearances for Wales.

== Football career ==
Allen was born in Gilfach Goch, Glamorgan and as a schoolboy attracted the attention of several football League clubs, including Manchester United, where he had an unsuccessful trial. On leaving school, he was employed in the Trave Colliery before signing for Swansea Town when he was 16. He had not broken into Swansea's first team before his career was interrupted by the Second World War.

During the war, he joined the Royal Navy where he served on board the battleship HMS Duke of York on convoy duty. Whilst serving on Duke of York, he took part in a football match at Scapa Flow against a team from the French battleship Richelieu.

He guested or Cardiff City during the hostilities and, after he was demobilised at the end of the war, he was signed by the club on a permanent basis in December 1945. Described as a "clever and skillful player with an excellent body swerve", he made his professional debut on the opening day of the 1946–47 season during a 2–1 defeat to Norwich City. Allen soon became a regular with Cardiff and his 18 goals helped them to promotion at the end of the first post-war Football League campaign. Allen, however, did not remain long in the Second Division and was transferred to Newport County in October 1947.

He returned to Ninian Park in August 1948, with Reg Parker moving in the opposite direction, but in May 1949 he was transferred to Reading. Nine months later, he was back in the Second Division with Coventry City. In January 1950, Reading had played an evening match against Coventry City; after the match, Reading's manager Ted Drake mentioned to Harry Storer that Allen was available for transfer. Storer then set off immediately to Allen's home, where he persuaded him to sign, with the deal being completed at midnight.

Allen's international debut came on 21 October 1950, when he was called up for the Home Championship match against Scotland. Despite displaying great "cohesion" and making good use of the ball "as a line", Wales lost 3–1 to the more muscular Scots. Allen retained his place for the next match against England the following month; this match also ended in a defeat for Wales.

Allen remained with Coventry until 1952, when he dropped down to non-league football with Merthyr Tydfil, before spells at Hereford United, Barry Town and Haverfordwest Athletic. At Barry Town, he was part of the team which won the Welsh Cup in 1955, defeating Chester 4–3 in the final, after a replay.

== International appearances ==
Roberts made two appearances for Wales in official international matches, as follows:

Date	Venue	Opponent	Result	Goals	Competition
21 October 1950	Ninian Park, Cardiff	Scotland	1–3	0	1951 British Home Championship
15 November 1950	Roker Park, Sunderland	England	2–4	0	1951 British Home Championship

Win	Draw	Loss

== Later career ==
After leaving professional football, Allen worked as a postman in his home town of Gilfach Goch, where he died on 21 July 2005. He was buried at Tonyrefail Cemetery.

In May 2007, Allen's collection of sporting memorabilia came up for auction. The lots included his Football League Division Three (South) Championship medal from 1946 to 1947 (sold for £1,100), his international jerseys from the matches against Scotland and England in 1950 (sold for £600 each) and a scrapbook of ephemera.

== Honours ==
Cardiff City

- Third Division South champions: 1946–47

Barry Town

- Welsh Cup winners: 1955
