= Stan Richards (footballer) =

Welsh footballer

Personal information
- Full name: Stanley Verdun Richards
- Date of birth: 21 January 1917
- Place of birth: Cardiff, Wales
- Date of death: 19 April 1987 (aged 70)
- Place of death: Wales
- Position: Centre forward

Senior career*
Years	Team	Apps	(Gls)
1946–1948	Cardiff City	57	(40)
1948–1951	Swansea Town	65	(35)
1951–1955	Barry Town	124	(87)
1955–1956	Haverfordwest County		

International career
1946	Wales	1	(0)
- * Club domestic league appearances and goals

Stanley Verdun Richards (21 January 1917 – 19 April 1987) was a Welsh professional footballer and Wales international.

== Career ==
Although he was born in Cardiff, Stan Richards began his career playing amateur football in London before joining his hometown team in 1946. He made his professional debut on the opening day of the season at the age of 29, scoring Cardiff's goal during a 2–1 defeat to Norwich City, and went on to score thirty league goals which was a club record for 56 years before it was broken by Robert Earnshaw in the 2002–03 season. It was during his time at Cardiff that he won his only cap for Wales in a match against England on 13 November 1946 in the 1947 British Home Championship. The following season he suffered a spate of injuries which restricted his appearances and, despite scoring 40 times in just 57 games, he was allowed to re-join former manager Billy McCandless at Swansea Town. Even though he was still hampered by the knee injury he was an instrumental part in helping the club win the Third Division South in 1948–49.

For the 1951–52 season, Richards signed for Barry Town, then playing in the Southern League and managed by Bill Jones, who later managed Cardiff City. He helped the club reach the 1st Round Proper of the FA Cup and was top goal scorer with 40 goals, many scored with an uncannily accurate header.

Richards opened 1952–53 with a hat-trick, the first of four that season, and scored seventeen goals in the first ten games. He was again Barry's top scorer with 35 goals and top scored the following season with 32 goals in 1953–54.

Richards scored in the 3–1 defeat of Wrexham in the 1955 semi-final of the Welsh Cup, but was injured for final against Chester City at the Racecourse Ground and the replay at Ninian Park, thus missing Barry's biggest triumph of the 1950s when they won the Welsh Cup for the first time, 4–3.

In October 1955, Stan left Barry Town after four years with the club and went to Haverfordwest County where he would finish his career at the club.
