= Fred Stansfield =

Welsh footballer (1917–2014)

Personal information
- Full name: Fred Stansfield
- Date of birth: 12 December 1917
- Place of birth: Cardiff, Wales
- Date of death: 30 March 2014 (aged 96)
- Place of death: Cardiff, Wales
- Position: Defender

Senior career*
Years	Team	Apps	(Gls)
1943–1949	Cardiff City	106	(1)
1949–1950	Newport County	21	(0)

International career
1948	Wales	1	(0)

Managerial career
- 1950–1953: Newport County
- 1954–1955: Bedford Town
- * Club domestic league appearances and goals

Fred Stansfield (12 December 1917 – 30 March 2014) was a Welsh international footballer.

== Career ==
Stansfield, a centre-half, had been playing for Grange Athletic when he joined Cardiff City in 1942 as a part-time professional. He was immediately appointed captain and was a regular in the war-time regional side but, due to World War II, he did not play a league match until 1946, making his debut on the opening day of the season in a 2–1 defeat by Norwich City. His form during the following season saw him called up for the Wales squad, winning his first cap against Scotland in October 1948. It turned out to be the only time he would play for his country as he suffered a broken ankle three months later in a league match against Barnsley.

His recovery meant he missed several months and on his return found his place in the Cardiff side taken by Stan Montgomery, who manager Cyril Spiers had signed from Southend United, and he left to join Newport County. He spent one season playing for the club making 21 appearances before being appointed manager at Somerton Park in 1950. After three years in charge at Newport he was appointed manager of Southern League team Bedford Town between March 1954 and March 1955.

After leaving football he owned a newsagents in Whitchurch, Cardiff until his retirement. As of 2010 he was, along with Tommy Forse, one of the two oldest surviving Cardiff City players. Stansfield died 30 March 2014, aged 96.

Sporting positions
Preceded by Unknown	Cardiff City captain 1946–1949	Succeeded by Unknown
