= List of FAW Premier Cup winners =

Welsh Football Premier Cup Competition

The FAW Premier Cup (formerly the FAW Invitation Cup) is a defunct Welsh football cup competition, organised annually by the Football Association of Wales from 1997 to 2008.

== Results ==
Year	Winner	Score	Runners-up	Venue	Attendance
1997–98	Wrexham	2–1	Cardiff City	Racecourse Ground	
1998–99	Barry Town	2–1	Wrexham	Racecourse Ground	
1999–2000	Wrexham	2–0	Cardiff City	Racecourse Ground	
2000–01	Wrexham	2–0	Swansea City	Vetch Field	
2001–02	Cardiff City	1–0	Swansea City	Ninian Park	6,629
2002–03	Wrexham	6–1	Newport County	Racecourse Ground	4,014
2003–04	Wrexham	4–1	Rhyl	Belle Vue	2,800
2004–05	Swansea City	2–1	Wrexham	Vetch Field	9,000
2005–06	Swansea City	2–1	Wrexham	Racecourse Ground	3,032
2006–07	The New Saints	1–0	Newport County	Newport Stadium	1,809
2007–08	Newport County	1–0	Llanelli	Newport Stadium	1,889
