= Fred Whitlow =

English footballer (1904–1978)

Personal information
- Full name: Frederick William James Whitlow
- Date of birth: 3 September 1904
- Place of birth: Bristol, England
- Date of death: 6 January 1978 (aged 73)
- Place of death: Bristol, England
- Position: Centre forward

Youth career
- 1921–22: Whitmore Albions

Senior career*
Years	Team	Apps	(Gls)
1922–1927	Barry Town		
1927–1928	Charlton Athletic		
1928	Dundee FC		
1928–1931	Charlton Athletic	100	(64)
1931–1934	Exeter City	83	(61)
1934–1935	Cardiff City	7	(1)
1935–1937	Barry Town		
- * Club domestic league appearances and goals

Frederick William James Whitlow (3 September 1904 – 6 January 1978) was an English professional footballer, who played in the Football League for Charlton Athletic and Exeter City.

== Early career in Barry ==
Born in Bristol on 3 September 1904, Frederick William James Whitlow's family eventually moved to Barry and made a home on Barry Island.

Whitlow initially played for Whitmore Albions (one of the junior teams on Barry Island at the time), and was part of the Albions side that defeated the Barry Brooklands on 12 May 1922. Appropriately enough, Whitlow scored in the 2–1 win. Whitmore Albions had also been crowned the winners of the Barry & District League Division 2, and had made it to the Barry Cup Final, but were defeated by the powerful Division 1 side Cadoxton AFC.

The 1922–23 season saw Southern League outfit Barry Town take a chance on the 17-year-old, and Whitlow played for Barry four times in Barry's Southern League campaign, as well as 15 times for the club's Welsh League side.

His senior debut came on 9 December 1922 in the Welsh League match against Caerau F.C. Whitlow's debut came on the back of the death of young Arthur Griffiths, who had died a couple of days earlier while working as a crane operator at Barry Docks.

Despite breaking into the area's senior side, Whitlow returned to the local league for the 1923–24 season, and took up residence in the Barry YMCA team.

Nevertheless, Whitlow was back on Barry's books for a second time for the 1924–25 season and fans only had to wait as long as 30 August to see him in action, when Whitlow scored the solitary Southern League goal that accounted for Ebbw Vale.

Whitlow debut FA Cup goal came in a 1st Qualifying Round defeat of Cardiff Corinthians where he and Stanley Cowie scored a brace each in the 4–0 victory. Whitlow debut Welsh League goal came in February 1925 when Caerau Athletic were mauled 5–1.

== Charlton Athletic and Dundee ==
By 1927–28, Whitlow had signed for Charlton Athletic, who were playing their football in the Football League Division 3 South. by Alex MacFarlane at the time, Withlow followed MacFarlane to Dundee in January 1928, where MacFarlane had previously spent 6 years as manager. However, the move was short-lived and Whitlow returned to Charlton in May 1928.

Playing in 38 of the 42 league matches in the 1928–29 season, Whitlow alone scored 27 of Charlton's 86 goals that season, and it was on goal difference that the Division 3 South title was grasped from the hands of local rivals Crystal Palace who had also finished the season on 54 points. Charlton were duly promoted to Division 2 as a result of their successes.

Division 2 football did not do anything to curtail Whitlow eye for goal, and a further 27 goals came in the course of the 1929–30 season as Charlton were able to consolidate their hold on Division Two football. The Addicks finished in 13th place, between fellow London clubs Tottenham Hotspur above them and Millwall below them. Recently, Charlton fans declared their joy in referring to the record books and noting that Charlton had not lost to their fierce Millwall rivals that season; both games ending 1–1 with Whitlow scoring the Charlton goal on each occasion!

Whitlow final season with Charlton Athletic came in the following season, 1930–31. Charlton remained safe in Division 2 by finishing 15th, after a contribution of 10 goals in 25 games from Whitlow. Whitlow's final Charlton goal came on 21 March 1931 in a home win over Reading FC, and a week later Whitlow's final appearance for the Addicks came against Southampton FC at the Dell. His career tally of 65 goals still ranks high in the Charlton record books.

== Exeter City and Cardiff City ==
For the 1931–32 season, Whitlow was transferred to the south coast of Devon to join Exeter City. Impressing in his first season with the Grecians, it was the 1932–33 campaign for which Exeter supporters' were sent all of a flutter. Finishing as runners-up in the Third Division South, the campaign remains the pinnacle of Exeter City's league football history – and Whitlow had more than a hand in the success that season.

Scoring 33 goals, sprinkled liberally with no less than seven home hat-tricks, Whitlow's goal scoring prowess in 1932–33 still remains an Exeter City club record.

Although the 1933–34 season didn't see Whitlow and Exeter reach the successes of the previous season, a 9th-place finish was still a solid performance by the Grecians. Nevertheless, it was time for Whitlow to move back to Wales. Signing for Cardiff City for 1934–35, Whitlow was puzzlingly reduced to playing in the reserves at Ninian Park. Unhappy at the prospect of spending any more time playing reserve football as he entered his 30s, Whitlow returned to Barry Town.

== Return to Barry ==
Upon Whitlow's return to Jenner Park, Barry seen their goalscoring ace, Dai Ward, retire from football – and as such, Whitlow had some mighty boots to fill. Linnets fans however need not have worried themselves. Whitlow was soon off the mark in an opening day defeat against Cheltenham Town, and then earned Barry a point after getting a brace against Bristol Rovers Reserves in a 2–2 draw.

Whitlow's first hat-trick at Barry came in a Welsh League victory over rivals Llanelly. A further hat-trick ensued in the FA Cup 2nd Qualifying Round 7–0 thumping over Bristol Rose Green in October. He even scored 6 goals against a hapless Troedyrhiw on 9 November.

It continued throughout the season, with Whitlow scoring 20 goals in 24 appearances in Southern League and Cup duties, and 27 goals in just 19 games in the Welsh League.

With the Reserves of Exeter City playing in the Southern League at this point, it was inevitable that Whitlow would be pitted against his old side sooner or later. With the newspapers recognising Whitlow's prowess in Exeter colours, Barry trainer Charlie Green also hyped up his appearance against Exeter – stating that it would be appropriate for Whitlow to reach his half-century of goals for Barry against the Grecian XI. As it turned out, Whitlow didn't get onto the score-sheet, but as an Exeter player did head through his own net after pressure from Whitlow. No doubt Exeter knew what to expect from their former player!

More plaudits came Whitlow's when his 2 goals in a 3–0 victory over Swansea in the South Wales Senior Cup was described as being "a revelation for its quality to 5,000 spectators. It was a triumph of leadership on the part of Fred Whitlow, who got two of the goals, and presented the opportunity for half a dozen more." It was Barry's first Senior Cup victory in a decade.

More successes came in the 1936–37 season, where Whitlow would score 22 Southern League and Cup goals in 21 appearances, and 27 goals in just 16 Welsh League appearances. Re-kindling his old Charlton Athletic and Exeter City hat-trick scoring exploits, Whitlow banged in 6 hat-tricks – equalling Dai Ward's record of a decade previously, and setting a bar that stood firm for a full 40 years until Clive Ayres scored 10 hat-tricks for Barry in the 1976–77 season.

In total, Fred Whitlow's return to Barry had resulted in 100 goals in just two seasons. The 1936–37 season also saw Barry Town's greatest Welsh Cup exploits to that point. After a 3–1 deficit to Aberaman in the 5th Round was clawed back to a 4–3 victory by full-time, with a goal from Whitlow, a full strength Cardiff City were beaten at Jenner Park in the 6th Round in front of over 5,000 supporters. Whitlow even grabbed a goal in the famous 3–1 victory. Whitlow took a knock at Exeter in the following league match, which resulted in him missing the Welsh Cup Quarter-final victory over Kidderminster Harriers.

== Retirement ==
Barry Town were through to their first Welsh Cup Semi-final, and Crewe Alexandra would be the opponents. Whitlow, however, had decided to call it a day. Citing personal and business reasons, Whitlow had decided on retirement at 33, missing Barry's biggest ever match in the process, a match they would go on to lose. For the fans, it was somewhat of a shock, many only finding out when the teams ran out onto the Ninian Park pitch for the semi-final tie.

Concentrating on his grocery shop business on Barry Island, Whitlow later returned to his birthplace of Bristol, where he died on 6 January 1978, aged 74. Between his days at Charlton, Exeter and Barry, Fred Whitlow scored just about 250 goals in as many appearances.
