= Chris Sander =

Chris Sander may refer to:

- Chris Sander (footballer) (born 1962), Welsh footballer
- Chris Sander (scientist), computational biologist
- Chris Sander (Missouri politician), member of the Missouri House of Representatives from the 33rd district
