= 1999–2000 FAW Premier Cup =

1999–00 FAW Premier Cup
Tournament details
- Country: England; Wales
- Teams: 12

Final positions
- Champions: Wrexham
- Runner-up: Cardiff City

The 1999–2000 FAW Premier Cup was the third season of the tournament since its founding in 1997.

== Group stage ==
=== Group A ===
Team	Pld	W	D	L	GF	GA	GD	Pts	SWA	CAN	CMT	INC
Swansea City	6	5	0	1	18	3	+15	15	—	2–0	7–0	4–0
Caernarfon Town	6	2	1	3	6	8	−2	7	0–1	—	1–0	1–1
Cwmbrân Town	6	2	1	3	7	12	−5	7	2–1	4–1	—	0–1
Inter Cardiff	6	1	2	3	4	12	−8	5	1–3	0–3	1–1	—

=== Group B ===
Team	Pld	W	D	L	GF	GA	GD	Pts	CAR	BAR	MER	NEW
Cardiff City	6	3	2	1	9	6	+3	11	—	2–2	3–1	2–1
Barry Town	6	2	4	0	8	6	+2	10	2–1	—	1–0	0–0
Merthyr Tydfil	6	1	2	3	5	7	−2	5	0–0	2–2	—	2–0
Newtown	6	1	2	3	3	6	−3	5	0–1	1–1	1–0	—

=== Group C ===
Team	Pld	W	D	L	GF	GA	GD	Pts	WRE	ABE	TNS	CON
Wrexham	6	6	0	0	18	2	+16	18	—	5–1	5–0	3–0
Aberystwyth Town	6	3	1	2	12	12	0	10	1–3	—	3–1	3–1
Total Network Solutions	6	1	2	3	6	12	−6	5	0–1	2–2	—	3–1
Conwy United	6	0	1	5	2	12	−10	1	0–1	0–2	0–0	—

== Quarter finals ==
Cardiff City	4–0	Aberystwyth Town
Andy Legg; Mark Bonner; Russell Perrett; Kevin Nugent

Wrexham	8–0	Merthyr Tydfil
Andy Morrell (7); Ian Stevens

Barry Town	2–0	Cwmbrân Town
Lawrence Davies; Richard Jones

Swansea City	0–1	Caernarfon Town
		Ryan Baker

== Semi finals ==
=== First leg ===
Wrexham	4–0	Barry Town
Craig Faulconbridge; Gareth Owen (2); Andy Morrell

Caernarfon Town	0–4	Cardiff City
		Danny Hill; Kevin Nugent; Jason Brown; Scott Young

=== Second leg ===
Cardiff City	4–1	Caernarfon Town
Danny Hill; Kevin Nugent (2); Paul Brayson		Tommy Wingrove

Barry Town	0–0	Wrexham

== Final ==
Wrexham	2–0	Cardiff City
Craig Faulconbridge (2)
