= James Lester =

James, Jim, or Jimmy Lester may refer to:

- James Lester (footballer) (born 2006), Trinidadian footballer
- Jim Lester (British politician) (1932–2021), British politician
- Jim Lester (Canadian politician) (fl. 2017–2021), Canadian politician
- Jimmy Lester (1932–2020), American politician
- James Peregrine Lester, a character in the TV series Primeval
