= Ernie Carless =

Welsh cricketer

Personal information
- Full name: Ernest Francis Carless
- Born: 9 September 1912; Cadoxton, Barry, Wales
- Died: 26 September 1987 (aged 75); Barry, Glamorgan, Wales
- Batting: Right-handed
- Bowling: Right-arm off break
- Role: Wicketkeeper

Domestic team information
- Years: Team
- 1947–1949: Devon
- 1946: Glamorgan
- 1934: Glamorgan

Career statistics
Competition	FC
Matches	3
Runs scored	35
Batting average	11.66
100s/50s	–/–
Top score	25
Balls bowled	–
Wickets	–
Bowling average	–
5 wickets in innings	–
10 wickets in match	–
Best bowling	–
Catches/stumpings	1/–
- Source: Cricinfo, 30 June 2010

Ernest Francis Carless (9 September 1912 – 26 September 1987) was a Welsh cricketer. Carless was a right-handed batsman who played primarily as a wicketkeeper. He also bowled right-arm off-breaks though he did not bowl in first-class cricket. Carless played football in the Football League for Cardiff City and Plymouth Argyle as an inside forward. He was born at Cadoxton, Glamorgan.

Carless made his first-class debut for Glamorgan in 1934 against Middlesex, though Tom Brierley kept wicket in this match; he played one further match for the county in that season, against Surrey, when Carless kept wicket. During the Second World War he played for the club in fund-raising matches. Following the end of the war and the resumption of County Cricket in 1946, Carless made his final first-class appearance, 12 years after his previous first-class match, in a Glamorgan side which was beset by injuries and struggling to field a team. His final first-class match was against Essex. In his 3 matches he scored 35 runs at a batting average of 11.66 and a high score of 25.

In 1947, Carless joined Devon, where he made his Minor Counties Championship debut for the county against Cornwall. From 1947 to 1949, he represented Devon in 7 Minor Counties fixtures, with his final appearance for the county coming against the Glamorgan Second XI.

A multi-talented sportsman, Carless played football as an inside forward. He began his career at Wolverhampton Wanderers, but did not make a first team appearance, and then returned to Wales to play for Barry Town. Carless made his Football League debut in 1932 with Cardiff City and spent several years there without establishing himself in the first team. He went on to play for Altrincham and return to Barry Town before the Second World War. Carless joined Plymouth Argyle in 1946, playing 11 games as a guest in the Football League South and then signing up to make four Second Division appearances when the full league programme returned.

In 1947, soon after his last appearance for Argyle, Carless accepted an offer to become the club's head groundsman, having gained experience doing the job for Cardiff City before moving to Plymouth. The role enabled him to continue his cricket career with Devon.

Carless died at Barry, Glamorgan on 26 September 1987.
