= Ashley Griffiths =

Welsh footballer

Personal information
- Full name: Ashley Russell Griffiths
- Date of birth: 5 January 1961 (age 65)
- Place of birth: Barry, Wales
- Position: Midfielder

Youth career
- –1979: Bristol Rovers

Senior career*
Years	Team	Apps	(Gls)
1979–1981	Bristol Rovers	7	(0)
1981	Torquay United	0	(0)
1981–1982	Yeovil Town	24	(2)
- Enfield
- Leytonstone & Ilford
- Barry Town United
- Newport County
- Inter Cardiff
- * Club domestic league appearances and goals

Ashley Russell Griffiths (born 5 January 1961) is a Welsh retired footballer.

== England career ==
Griffiths played seven games over two seasons for Bristol Rovers F.C. His debut came in the last game of the 1979–80 Football League season.

== Welsh career ==
Griffiths played extensively in the Welsh Premier League, including successes with Barry Town United F.C. where he was also an assistant manager and manager. He was ultimately introduced to the club hall of fame.
