= Gary Barnett (footballer) =

English footballer and coach

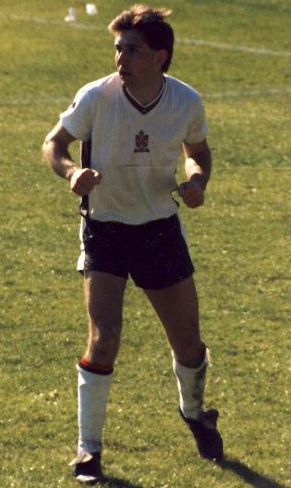
- Gary Barnett playing for Fulham.

Personal information
- Full name: Gary Lloyd Barnett
- Date of birth: 11 March 1963 (age 63)
- Place of birth: Stratford-upon-Avon, England
- Height: 5 ft 6 in (1.68 m)
- Position: Midfielder

Youth career
- Coventry City

Senior career*
Years	Team	Apps	(Gls)
1981–1982	Coventry City	0	(0)
1982–1985	Oxford United	45	(9)
1983	→ Wimbledon (loan)	5	(1)
1984	→ Fulham (loan)	2	(1)
1985–1990	Fulham	180	(30)
1990–1993	Huddersfield Town	100	(11)
1993–1995	Leyton Orient	63	(7)
1995–1999	Barry Town	132	(13)
1999–2001	Kidderminster Harriers	10	(2)

Managerial career
- 1996–1999: Barry Town (player-manager)
- Moreton Rangers
- * Club domestic league appearances and goals

Gary Lloyd Barnett (born 11 March 1963) is an English former professional footballer and football coach. He made nearly 400 appearances in the Football League playing as a midfielder for Oxford United, Wimbledon, Fulham, Huddersfield Town, Leyton Orient and Kidderminster Harriers. After leaving Leyton Orient in the summer of 1995, he was on trial with Norwegian club IL Hødd. As player-manager of League of Wales club Barry Town, he was honoured with the League of Wales Manager of the Year award in three consecutive seasons, for leading the club to a succession of domestic honours and to the first round proper of the 1996–97 UEFA Cup.

== Honours ==
Oxford United

- Football League Third Division: 1983–84
