= Jenner Park Stadium =

Sports stadium in Barry, Wales

Jenner Park
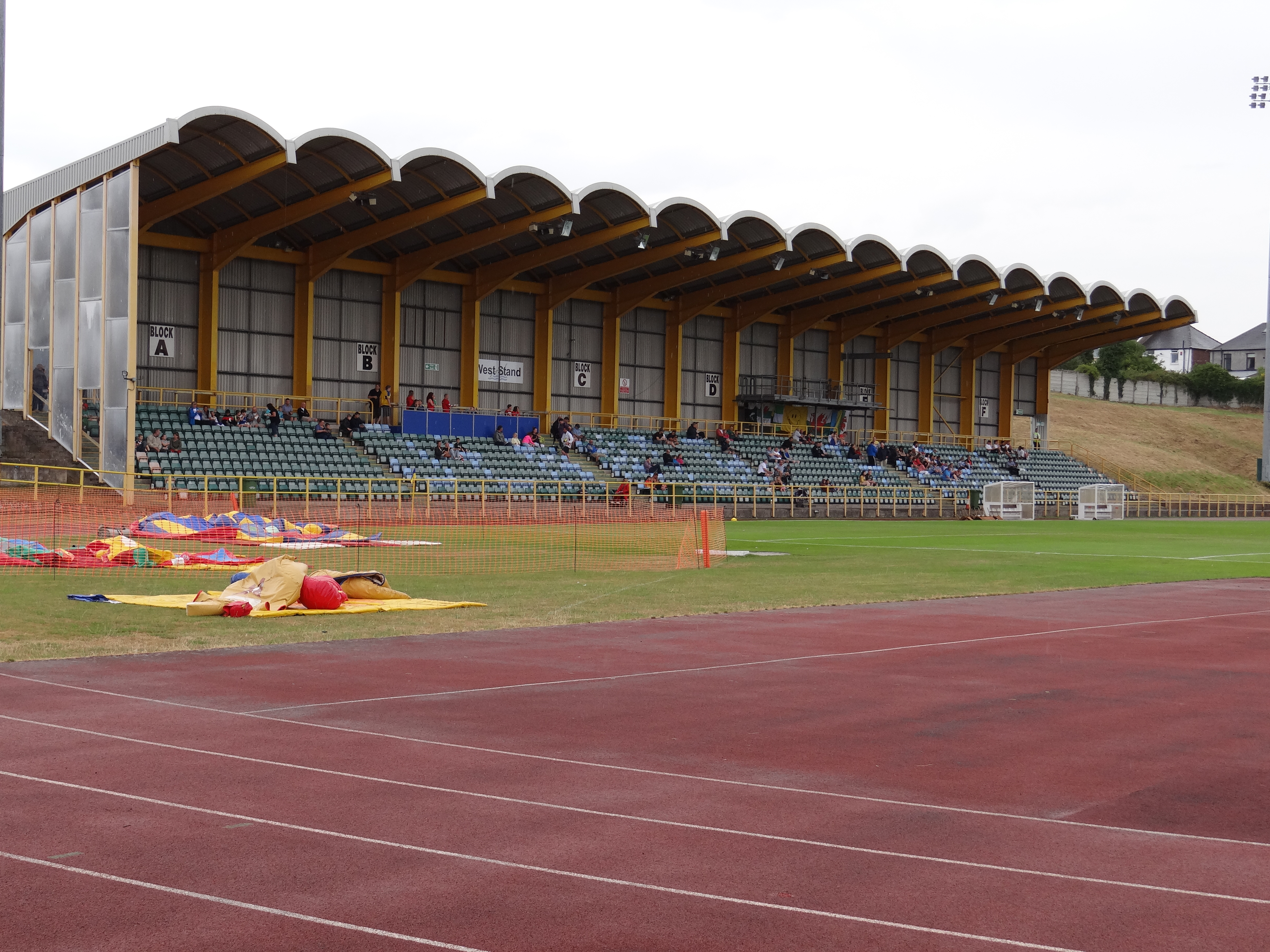
- Jenner Park's modern grandstand.
- Interactive map of Jenner Park
- Location: Barry
- Coordinates: 51°24′39″N 3°15′55″W
- Operator: Vale of Glamorgan Council
- Capacity: 2,650 all seater
- Surface: 3G turf and synthetic track

Construction
- Built: 1912–1913
- Opened: 1913
- Renovated: 1986–1989, 2015
- Expanded: 1996

Tenant
- Barry Town United (1913–present)

Jenner Park is the premier sports stadium in Barry, Vale of Glamorgan, Wales and traditional home of football club, Barry Town United.

== Overview ==
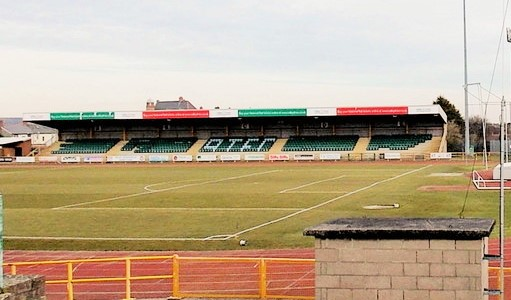
The second stand at Jenner Park, known locally as the 'New Stand'.

Jenner Park occupies the space of land between Barry's Gladstone Road and Barry Road and has been the setting for the evolution of Barry's senior football club for more than 100 years, as well as hosting athletics, greyhound racing and other attractions over the decades.

Named after the Jenner family, who donated the land, the ground was built by the Barry football enthusiasts for their representative side to compete at the highest possible level and was completed between the landmark meeting of 1912 and the opening fixture of 1913–14.

Among the most notable Barry matches played at Jenner Park have been European ties, domestic cup finals, major semi-finals and quarter-finals, FA Cup fixtures, televised matches, testimonials, high-scoring thrillers and friendlies against high-profile opposition. The final of the 2018–19 Welsh League Cup was played at the ground between Cardiff Metropolitan University and Cambrian & Clydach Vale B. & G.C. with the Mets winning 2–0.

Comprised initially of two wooden stands, popular bank terracing was added in 1923 and floodlights added in the 1940s, allowing Jenner Park to host Wales' first ever floodlit football match between Barry and Newport in 1949–50.

During the 1980s, the local council rebuilt Jenner Park, installing a synthetic running track, a new all-seater stand and improved floodlights. Then, to bring Jenner Park up to UEFA standards, a second covered stand was built in the mid-1990s, boosting the seating capacity to 2,500. This was increased to over 6,000 for the visits of Aberdeen and Manchester United in 1996 with the use of temporary bleachers behind each goal; a practice no longer permitted.

Recent years have seen the addition of a special viewing area for wheelchair users in the grandstand (known colloquially as the 'Old Stand'), accessible via the stadium's Devon Avenue entrance. Most recently, August 2015 saw work undertaken on installing a new, state-of-the-art 3G pitch, completed in October 2015. Wales manager Chris Coleman was on hand for the official opening.

== Greyhound racing ==
In 1928 the football club attempted to bring greyhound racing to Jenner Park, but the council rejected the plans put in by Alderman Councillor C.B. Griffiths OBE. However, on 26 August 1932, the plans were finally passed despite opposition from the local clergy. The first meeting took place on 3 September 1932. The profits created by the racing enabled the survival of the football team during a lean spell for the club before World War II. After the war Jenner Park was bought by the Welsh Greyhound Association (WGA) £5,000 with the proviso that football could continue. The football team were given free tenancy and a Saturday slot for their matches. The ownership switched to the Aberdare Greyhound Association in July 1955, and during the same year the council acquired the ground and put an end to the greyhound racing.

== See also ==
- List of stadiums in Wales by capacity
