= 1998–99 FAW Premier Cup =

Tournament details
- Country: England; Wales
- Teams: 12

Final positions
- Champions: Barry Town
- Runner-up: Wrexham

The 1998–99 FAW Premier Cup was the second season of the tournament since its founding in 1997.

== Group stage ==
=== Group A ===
Team	Pld	W	D	L	GF	GA	GD	Pts	CAR	MER	BAN	RHL
Cardiff City	6	3	2	1	13	6	+7	11	—	2–2	0–1	3–2
Merthyr Tydfil	6	2	4	0	7	5	+2	10	0–0	—	2–1	2–1
Bangor City	6	2	1	3	7	9	−2	7	1–4	0–0	—	3–1
Rhyl	6	1	1	4	7	14	−7	4	0–4	1–1	2–1	—

=== Group B ===
Team	Pld	W	D	L	GF	GA	GD	Pts	BAR	SWA	WRE	CAN
Barry Town	6	4	1	1	10	5	+5	13	—	2–0	3–2	3–1
Swansea City	6	3	2	1	9	5	+4	11	1–1	—	2–2	3–0
Wrexham	6	3	1	2	7	7	0	10	1–0	0–2	—	1–0
Caernarfon Town	6	0	0	6	1	10	−9	0	0–1	0–1	0–1	—

=== Group C ===
Team	Pld	W	D	L	GF	GA	GD	Pts	INC	NEW	CMT	CQN
Inter CabelTel	6	4	0	2	12	6	+6	12	—	0–1	2–0	3–2
Newtown	6	4	0	2	7	10	−3	12	2–1	—	0–1	2–1
Cwmbrân Town	6	2	2	2	11	8	+3	8	1–3	6–0	—	1–1
Connah's Quay Nomads	6	0	2	4	7	13	−6	2	0–3	1–2	2–2	—

== Quarter finals ==
23 February 1999

Inter CableTel	4–0	Cwmbrân Town
Simon Tyler; Neil O'Brien (o.g.); Steve Mardenborough; Paul Evans

23 February 1999

Newtown	0–1	Wrexham
		Karl Connolly

2 March 1999

Cardiff City	3–2	Swansea City
Dai Thomas; Jeff Eckhardt; John Williams		Julian Alsop; Ryan Casey

16 March 1999

Barry Town	1–0	Merthyr Tydfil
Richard Jones

== Semi finals ==
=== First leg ===
20 April 1999

Barry Town	2–0	Inter CableTel
Justin Perry; Danny Carter

27 April 1999

Wrexham	3–1	Cardiff City
Martin Chalk; Mark McGregor; Karl Connolly		Christian Roberts

=== Second leg ===
27 April 1999

Inter CableTel	1–3	Barry Town
Derek Brazil		Andrew York; Lee Dyson (o.g.); Justin Perry

10 May 1999

Cardiff City	2–1	Wrexham
Craig Middleton; Kevin Nugent		Andy Morrell

== Final ==
23 May 1999

Wrexham	1–2	Barry Town
Karl Connolly 73'		Justin Perry 58'; Lee Barrow 84'

Racecourse Ground, Wrexham
