= Mark Ovendale =

English footballer

Personal information
- Full name: Mark John Ovendale
- Date of birth: 22 November 1973
- Place of birth: Leicester, England
- Date of death: 29 August 2011 (aged 37)
- Position: Goalkeeper

Senior career*
Years	Team	Apps	(Gls)
1994–1995	Northampton Town	6	(0)
1995–1998	Barry Town	112	(0)
1998–2000	AFC Bournemouth	89	(0)
2000–2003	Luton Town	45	(0)
2003	Barry Town	0	(0)
2003–2004	York City	41	(0)
2004–2006	Tiverton Town	106	(0)
2006	Carmarthen Town	0	(0)
2006–2007	Newport County	30	(0)
2008–2009	Wimborne Town		
Total		429	(0)
- * Club domestic league appearances and goals

Mark John Ovendale (22 November 1973 – 29 August 2011) was an English football goalkeeper.

== Playing career ==
Ovendale was born in Leicester and began his career with local village team Leverington before joining Wisbech Town. He moved to Northampton Town, playing six league games in the 1994–95 season. He joined Welsh champions Barry Town in August 1997 and after a successful first season, joined AFC Bournemouth for a fee of £30,000 in July 1998.

He quickly became the first choice in the Bournemouth goal, making his Cherries' debut on the opening day of the 1998–99 season, a 2–0 win at home to Lincoln City. He remained a regular over the next two seasons before a £425,000 move took him to Luton Town in August 2000.

Luton manager Ricky Hill installed Ovendale as his first choice goalkeeper, but he struggled to make an impact and spent the season in and out of the side, with former first choice Nathan Abbey replacing him on a number of occasions. With Abbey released and Luton relegated at the end of the season, Ovendale found himself as second choice goalkeeper, following the signing of Carl Emberson.

He appeared only sporadically over the next two seasons and was released in 2003. In late July that year he re-signed for Barry Town, but just two weeks later joined York City. York were relegated to the Conference at the end of the season, and Ovendale was one of a number of players released.

He signed for non-league Tiverton Town in the summer of 2004, where he remained until May 2006 when he joined Welsh side Carmarthen Town. He played for Carmarthen in the Inter-Toto Cup against Finnish side Tampere United, but left in July 2006 to join Newport County, signing as a replacement for the injured Tony Pennock. He was forced to retire from playing in June 2007 due to a hip injury.

== Coaching career ==
Mark joined Wimborne Town in a coaching role in August 2008 but made a few appearances in goal for the club during the 2008–09 season.

== Death ==
He died in August 2011 from cancer. Days after Ovendale's death, his old club Barry Town honoured him into the Barry Town Hall of Fame and a memorial match was held at the Newport Stadium.
