= Stanley Cowie =

English footballer (1890–1927)

Personal information
- Date of birth: 1890
- Place of birth: Newcastle upon Tyne, England
- Date of death: August 1927 (aged 36–37)
- Position: Inside right

Senior career*
Years	Team	Apps	(Gls)
- Herrington Swifts
1911	Blackpool	3	(0)
- Exeter City
1920–1927	Barry		
- * Club domestic league appearances and goals

Stanley Cowie (1890 – August 1927) was an English professional footballer. An inside right, he played in the Football League for Blackpool and was also on the books of Exeter City. His body was "found in the River Tyne with his hands and feet tied with cord" in August 1927. Cowie's death was ruled "suicide while of unsound mind".
