= John Macey =

English footballer

Personal information
- Date of birth: 13 November 1947 (age 78)
- Place of birth: Bristol, England
- Position: Goalkeeper

Youth career
- 1965–1968: Bristol City

Senior career*
Years	Team	Apps	(Gls)
1968–1970	Grimsby Town	37	(0)
1970–1976	Newport County	194	(0)
- Minehead
Total		231	(0)
- * Club domestic league appearances and goals

John Macey (born 13 November 1947) is an English former professional footballer. A goalkeeper, Macey joined Newport County from Grimsby Town in 1970. He made 194 appearances for Newport before joining Minehead in 1976.

After retiring from playing he set up a successful sports accessories outlet in Newport.
