= Jenner Park =

- District of Barry
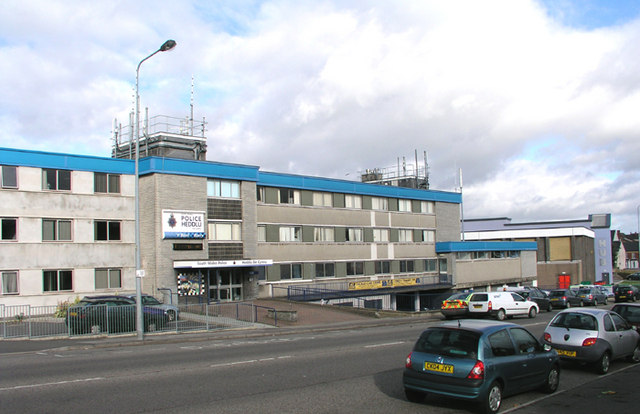
- Barry Police HQ

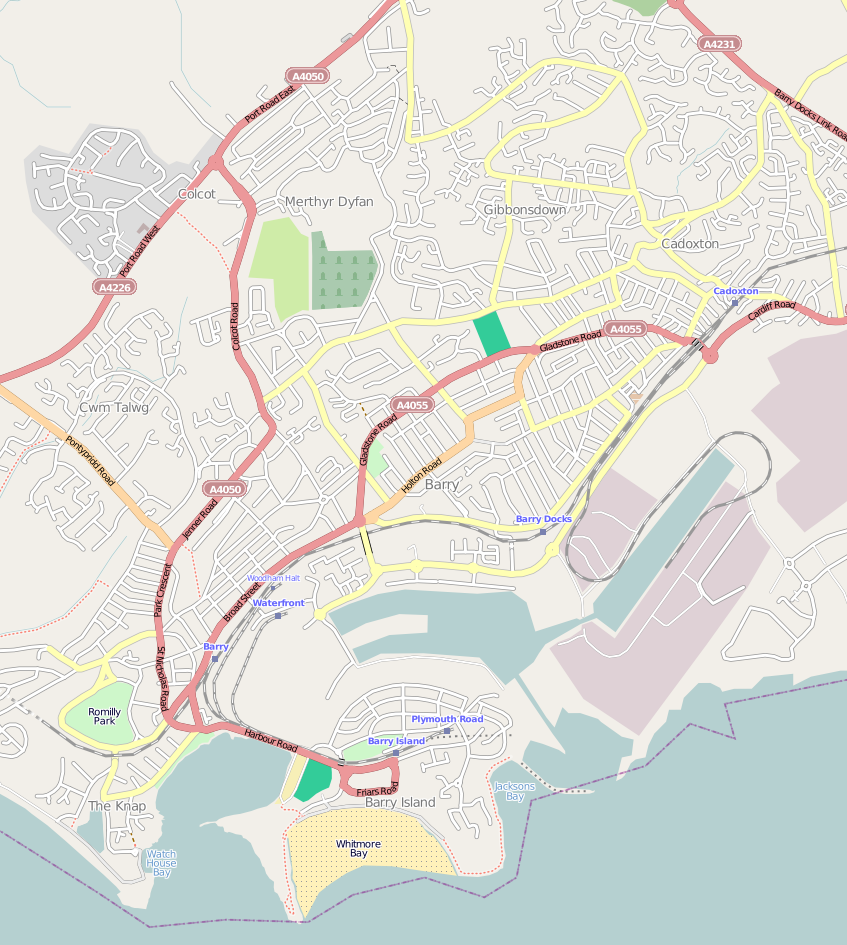
- Location in Barry
- Coordinates: 51°24′43.2″N 3°15′54″W
- Country: United Kingdom
- Region: Wales
- County: Vale of Glamorgan
- Town: Barry
- Time zone: UTC+0 (GMT)

Jenner Park is a central district of Barry in the Vale of Glamorgan 14 miles outside Cardiff in South Wales.

It is home to the Jenner Park Stadium, which is the football ground of Barry Town F.C., and Jenner Park Primary School.
