= Alexander Macfarlane (disambiguation) =

Alexander Macfarlane (1851–1913) was a Scottish logician, physicist, and mathematician.

Alexander Macfarlane may also refer to:

- Alexander MacFarlane (astronomer) (1702–1755), Scottish merchant, planter and astronomer
- Alexander Macfarlane (politician) (1818–1898), Canadian lawyer and politician
- Alex MacFarlane, Australian activist
- Sandy MacFarlane (1878–1945), Scottish football player and manager
