= Barry Town United F.C. =

Association football club in Wales

Barry Town United
- Full name: Barry Town United Football Club
- Nicknames: Town, Linnets, Dragons
- Founded: 1912; 114 years ago (as Barry AFC)
- Ground: Jenner Park, Barry
- Capacity: 3,500 (2,200 seated)
- Manager: Steve Jenkins
- League: Cymru Premier
- 2025–26: Cymru Premier, 3rd of 12
- Website: www.barrytown.co.uk
Home colours	Away colours

Barry Town United Football Club (Welsh: Clwb Pêl-droed Tref Unedig y Barri or Clwb Pêl-droed Tref y Barri) is a semi-professional association football team based in Barry, Wales. They currently play in the Cymru Premier.

They are known for representing Wales in Europe as winners of the Welsh top flight and Welsh Cup during the 1990s and early 2000s and have also competed in England's Southern League and FA Cup. The team, which has contained more than 50 full internationals, is now run by supporters. They play at their traditional home of Jenner Park, Barry, which holds 3,500 spectators.

== History ==
=== Formation ===

First ever Barry XI at Jenner Park

Barry Town United's history dates back to 1892 when an association football team named Barry and Cadoxton District was formed in the area. During the early years, this side endured many upheavals, playing on five different grounds under various identities, including Barry Unionist Athletic, Barry United Athletic and Barry District. Players who featured during these years included Ted Vizard and Billy Jennings; who would each go on to play in the famous 'White Horse' FA Cup Final.

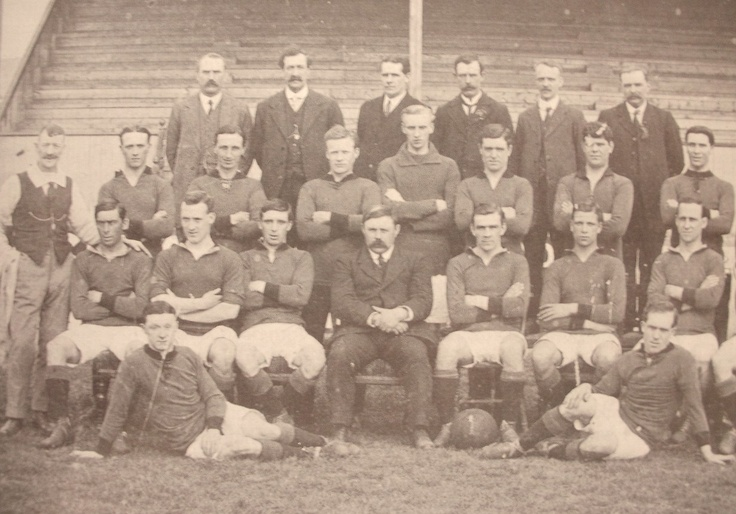
Barry AFC team photograph, featuring players/officials of 1913–14

In November 1912, a meeting at The Windsor public house in Holton Road saw townsfolk choose to pursue membership of the thriving Southern League as Barry AFC (the 'Town' suffix was added after World War II). The club would secure land owned by the Jenner family and the people of the town came together to build Jenner Park, ahead of the first match of the 1912–13 season.

On 6 September 1913, Barry played their first fixture; a Southern League match against Mid-Rhondda at Jenner Park. The game attracted 4,000 spectators, including 1,000 travelling supporters.

Fittingly, the new team would register a surprise, albeit merited, victory, with Barry's Ralph Isherwood scoring the very first goal at Jenner Park just three minutes in. His second, midway through the second half, sealed a 2–1 victory, a fine start for the Barry side on, coincidentally, the same afternoon that Arsenal played their first match at Highbury.

The ensuing two seasons would see Stoke City, Brentford, Coventry City and others visit the new ground. However, the Great War would soon interrupt any competitive proceedings; with Barry captain Major James Wightman one of the many casualties of The Battle of the Somme.

=== Southern League success ===
The 1920–21 season ranks as one of the finest in Barry's history, as they surprised many by becoming champions of the Southern League's Welsh section. The achievement was all the more impressive when considering the small Barry squad played over 100 matches in all competitions during the course of the season. Competing simultaneously in both the Welsh and Western League, the Barry board gave priority to Southern League fixtures, swayed by aspirations of joining the new English Third Division.

Inspired by Stanley Cowie, the title was clinched in early May, and yet hopes of Barry being able to move up to the Football League were scuppered just a month later, when their application failed and Charlton Athletic and Aberdare Athletic (the latter of whom finished second to Barry in their section) were elected instead.

Barry retained membership of the Southern League for more than 60 years – their highest finish being fourth in the 1930s. Among the notable players of the era were Johnny Gardner (with over 500 appearances), Dai Ward (scorer of more than 300 goals) and Fred Whitlow (a 100+ goal marksman). Meanwhile, Barry-born sportsman Ernie Carless combined his footballing exploits with a successful cricketing career with Glamorgan.

=== FA Cup and Welsh Cup glory ===

1955 Welsh Cup winning XI

At the end of the 1920s, a crowd of 6,000 at Upton Park saw Barry beat Dagenham Town 1–0 to progress to the FA Cup 2nd Round; before losing to Brighton & Hove Albion ten days later. It proved to be their most successful run in the competition. Barry would reach the 1st Round again in 1934–35, losing 1–0 to Northampton Town at Jenner Park, but the build-up to the match was tainted by a fire that ravaged the grandstand.

Football again took a backseat in 1939, with the eruption of World War II. Barry's Chris Mason was captured as a prisoner of war during the conflict, though later returned to Jenner Park to resume his career. Spectators followed the careers of players such as Derek Tapscott (who later signed for Arsenal), striker Stan Richards, and Gwilym 'Cannonball' Cain.

In the 1949–50 season, Jenner Park became one of the first grounds in the country to introduce floodlights, with Newport County, Swansea City and Cardiff City all visiting to showcase the facilities. Two seasons later, an all-Welsh showdown in the FA Cup 1st Round saw Barry beaten by Newport, 4–0. Nevertheless, the town's most celebrated footballing achievement was right around the corner.

In May 1955, following a 1–1 draw at the Racecourse in Wrexham, Barry beat Chester City 4–3 at Ninian Park to lift the Welsh Cup for the first time. Former Chelsea right-wing Charlie Dyke scored the winner, a dramatic late free-kick to take the cup back to Barry.

=== 1960s, 1970s and 1980s ===
In the late 1950s, a host of Scandinavian stars made their way to Jenner Park, and dazzled Barry football enthusiasts with their skill. Among their number were Finland's Hannu Kankkonen and Bengt 'Folet' Berndtsson; a member of the Sweden squad that reached the final of the 1958 World Cup. The influx of players from continental Europe came as a result of chairman John Bailey's business interests overseas.

During this period, the club embarked on an overseas tour, playing three games in Malta in 1960 against Sliema Wanderers, Hibernians and Valletta that all ended in draws.

1961 saw another big match as QPR visited Jenner Park in the FA Cup. A crowd of 7,000 saw Laurie Sheffield's opener for Barry cancelled out late on. QPR won the replay at Loftus Road comfortably. The 1960s and 70s are perhaps most fondly remembered for the personalities that pulled on the Barry shirt. Among them, prolific goalscorers Ken Gully and Clive Ayres, brothers John and Dickie Batt, long-serving Bobby Smith and Ashley Griffiths, and tall defender Mike Cosslett; now a member of the club coaching staff.

In 1982, Barry left the Southern League, focusing on Welsh League competition and winning six Welsh League titles before the decade's end; thanks in no small part to the goals of striker Steve Williams. The most significant match of the decade though came on 17 November 1984, as 3,850 crammed into Jenner Park to see Barry vs Reading in the FA Cup 1st Round. Despite Ian Love's goal, an injury-time winner by Trevor Senior was enough to send the Royals through.

=== Exile and return ===
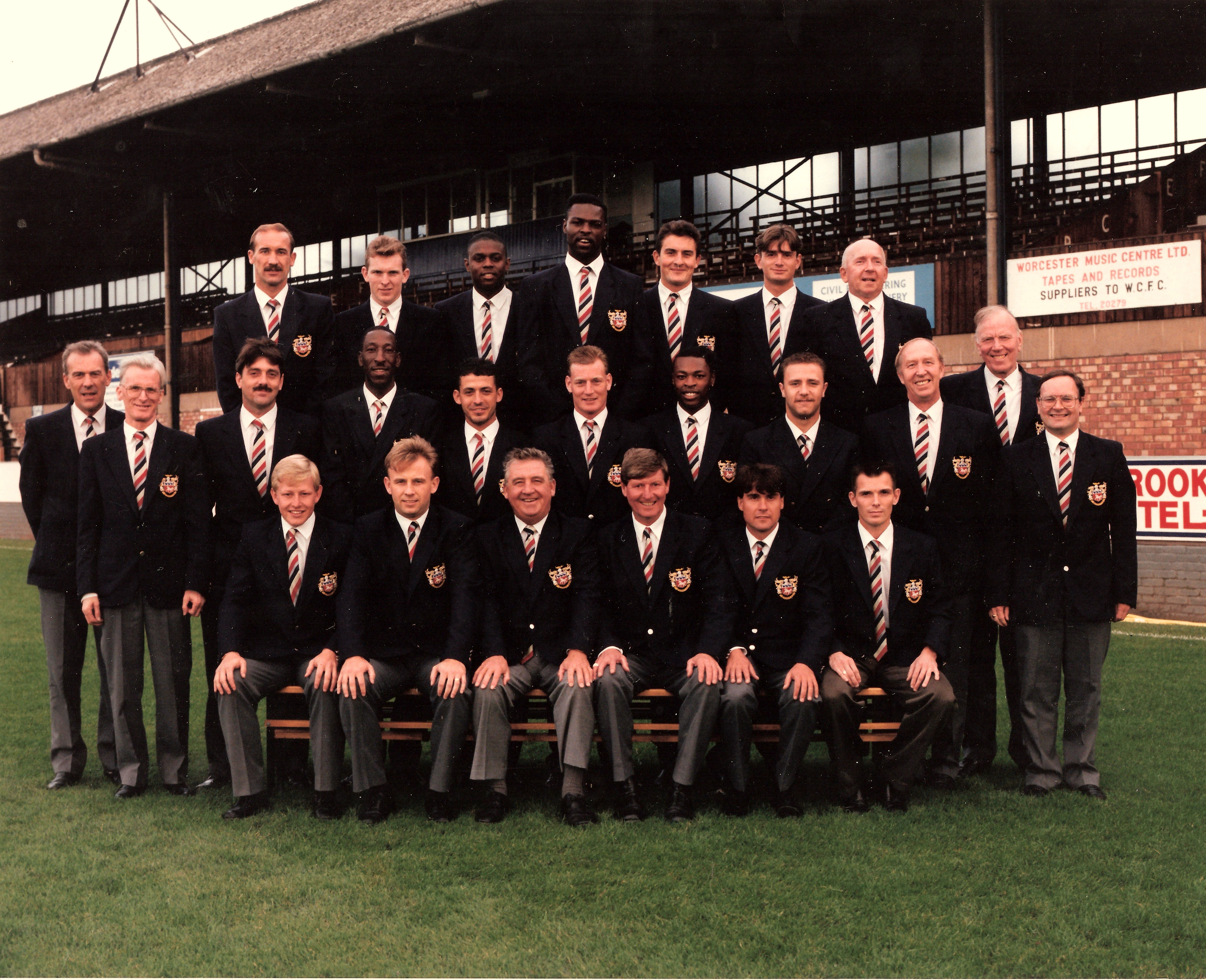
Barri in Worcester, 1992–93

After insufficient floodlighting had stopped the club being able to compete in the Southern League for most of the 1980s, the tail end of the decade saw the necessary ground improvements to support a return to England. Barry entered the league's Midland Division and would consistently finish in the top six, yet were denied the opportunity to field a reserve XI in the Welsh League as they had done previously.

The creation of the League of Wales (now Cymru Premier) in 1992 then prompted a decree that Barry would no longer be able to compete in the English pyramid at all while based on Welsh soil. As part of a group of rebel clubs known as the Irate Eight (alongside Newport, Merthyr, Colwyn Bay, Bangor City, Caernarfon Town, Newtown and Rhyl), the Town were forced into exile; with the first team adopting the name of Barri AFC and playing 'home' matches at Worcester City's ground, while the reserves (by now, a local league outfit), manned the Jenner Park fort. However, this arrangement would last only one season, as chairman O' Halloran performed a shock u-turn that saw the Barry first team return home; eventually accepted into Welsh League Division One for the 1993–94 campaign.

=== Decade of dominance ===
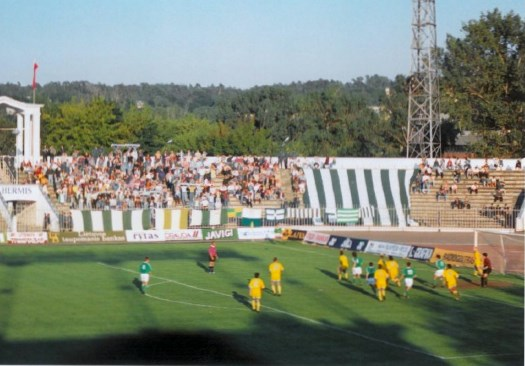
Barry (in yellow) in action in Lithuania in the summer of 1994

Barry's return to Jenner Park would spark the side's most successful period, as they earned immediate promotion to the top flight and a unique quadruple of Welsh League championship, Welsh League Cup, FAW Trophy and Welsh Cup (for the first time since 1955).

The latter was one of the Town's most famous achievements, as they upset Football League Second Division outfit Cardiff City in front of 16,000 spectators at the old National Stadium. Barry's reward for winning the Welsh Cup was a European Cup Winners Cup tie against Žalgiris Vilnius of Lithuania, but they crashed out 7–0 on aggregate. Greater glory was on the horizon.

After one season in the League of Wales, Barry opted to become the league's first fully professional club and, thereafter, won their first league championship in 1995–96. The season was though marred by the deaths of chairman Neil O' Halloran and young midfielder Matthew Holtham, the latter in a motorway accident on the way back from an away match in April.

1996 saw the club create history as the first League of Wales side to progress beyond the opening round of a European competition.

Following victory in Latvia over Dinaburg, Barry ousted Hungarian side Budapest Vasutas in one of several epic European nights at Jenner Park. Despite trailing 3–1 from the away leg, Barry stormed to a victory in the return match by the same score-line, and then won a penalty shoot-out 4–2.

A memorable all-British tie with Scottish Premier League side Aberdeen was their reward and, after losing 3–1 to Roy Aitken's side at Pittodrie, the Welshmen were held to a pulsating 3–3 draw at a rain-swept Jenner Park; exiting the cup in thrilling fashion before a crowd of over 6,000.

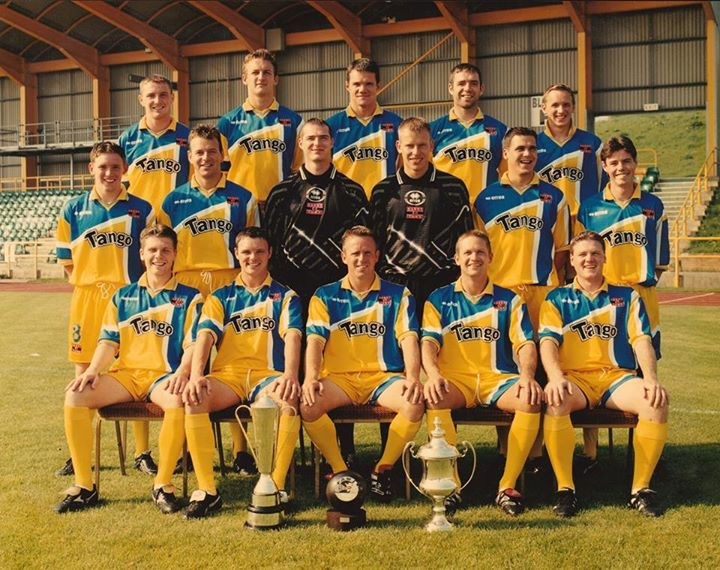
The Barry squad of 1999 at Jenner Park, with the League of Wales Cup, FAW Premier Cup and Cymru Premier trophies.

On the domestic scene, Barry were all-conquering, clinching a first treble of League of Wales championship, Welsh League Cup and Welsh Cup. The championship was claimed with a record 105 points and a goal difference of more than +100. In January 1997, the team was part of the first League of Wales match to be broadcast live on television; a 5–2 win over visitors Caernarfon Town that still holds the league's attendance record. Then, from March, Barry went 51 matches without tasting a single defeat in a league fixture.

1999 saw Barry become the first League of Wales team to win the FAW Premier Cup, with a 2–1 win over Wrexham at the club's own Racecourse Ground. Pipped to the title in 2000 by the emerging TNS, Barry would regain their crown the following campaign, while European battles with the likes of Dynamo Kyiv and Boavista saw players of the highest calibre grace Jenner Park (among them, the likes of Andriy Shevchenko and Serhii Rebrov.)

Then, in the 2001–02 season, Barry notably became the first League of Wales team to win a European Champions League tie, when they defeated the Azerbaijan champions FC Shamkir to set up a tie with Portuguese club FC Porto. Barry lost the first leg in Portugal by an emphatic 8–0 margin, after conceding two early penalties in front of a partisan 55,000 crowd. However, the Town would win the home leg 3–1, recording a famous result that has grown in legend with the career success of Porto's Ricardo Carvalho, Helder Postiga and others.

=== Decline and turmoil ===
The golden era would not last forever, and the continual challenge of securing enough prize money to sustain their high standards set would eventually catch up with those running the club. After chairperson and backer Paula O' Halloran stood aside, former Scarborough and Grantham Town official Kevin Green came in as the club's new chief executive; yet his varying initiatives failed to stop the rot. In one move that garnered significant press, Green would recruit ex-footballer and celebrity John Fashanu as the club's high-profile chairman in the winter of 2002. Some saw Fashanu as the missing piece of the puzzle, and the man who would help sustain Barry's success going forward. Promising African and Chinese TV deals and an influx of Nigerian internationals, Fashanu made headlines, yet did little to steady a Barry ship in increasingly rough seas. Then, after success on ITV reality show I'm A Celebrity, Get Me Out of Here! saw him attain new-found popularity, Fashanu left the club; which by now was in a perilous financial state.

In the summer of 2003, the club went into administration and the professional squad would quickly disintegrate. An interim management team was appointed, together with an amateur squad drawn primarily from local side N & M Construction of the South Wales Amateur League (five levels below the Welsh Premier). Within a month, Barry had gone from winning a match in Europe to losing 8–0 at Caernarfon Town. Though the professional-era bubble had well and truly burst, fans set about raising money to help keep the club alive. Eventually, mystery man Stuart Lovering arrived to purchase of the club on 10 December 2003. Few could have foreseen what was to come.

2003–04 was a difficult season, with champions Barry's first league win not coming until February 2004 when they beat fellow strugglers Welshpool Town 5–4 with a 98th-minute winning penalty from youngster Luke Sherbon. Manager Colin Addison was brought in resuscitate the team's ailing fortunes, yet the Dragons still ended up bottom of the division, four points off safety, and were relegated to the Welsh League Division One. Controversially, Addison was dismissed by Lovering on the eve of the new campaign, with assistant David Hughes replacing him; only to leave himself months later on finding his budget slashed. In the meantime, an independent district valuer had determined that the club should pay £42,000 in rent and rates each season for the remainder of the lease. Judging the figure to be unfairly based on the club's relinquished professional status, Lovering refused to pay this amount and instead moved the senior side to the White Tips Stadium in Treforest from January 2005 to May 2006. During the absence, a number of staunch supporters formed breakaway club Barry FC; the culmination of a series of disputes with chairman Lovering, who had banned them from fundraising at club. With the Town relegated to their lowest-ever league status at the end of the 2005–06 season, the future appeared bleak for this fallen giant of Welsh football.

=== Fan-led fightback ===
While chaos reigned off the field for much of the decade, the roots of recovery began to grow in 2007, with the appointment of new manager Gavin Chesterfield. Chesterfield led Barry to promotion in 2008, with the hope that a winning run of form in the second tier would see the club's dwindling support return. After stumbling early on, Barry enjoyed a 21-match unbeaten streak and finished the season a credible third. Nevertheless, the team's achievements were continually overshadowed by events behind the scenes.

In December 2008, a crisis meeting at Jenner Park saw supporters come forward to pledge their commitment to operating the first team (forming a new company for this purpose), to allow Lovering to focus on finding a buyer. In one of a number of close calls, the club appeared on the verge of being sold in 2010, when businessman Clayton Jones appeared to strike a deal. However, this fell through at the eleventh hour, scuppering a plan to bring in Wales international John Hartson as Director of Football.

Undeterred, 2010 saw the Stand Up For Barry campaign launch, using new social media platforms such as Twitter to spread news of the club's plight with a wider online audience. The resulting support from across the football community proved an invaluable asset as supporters strived to keep the club alive.

Shortly after the close of the 2010–11 season, Lovering announced his fresh intent of withdrawing the first team from higher league competition. To prevent this, the Barry Town Supporters' Committee (BTSC) took complete control of all football and its funding; resulting in what became known to some supporters as the 'DIY Football' era. In the months that followed, the rejuvenated, fan-run Barry set-up enjoyed their most successful Welsh Cup campaign in several seasons; defeating rivals Merthyr Town at Penydarren Park and winning at Haverfordwest County in extra-time, before being edged out 3–2 at Newport County.

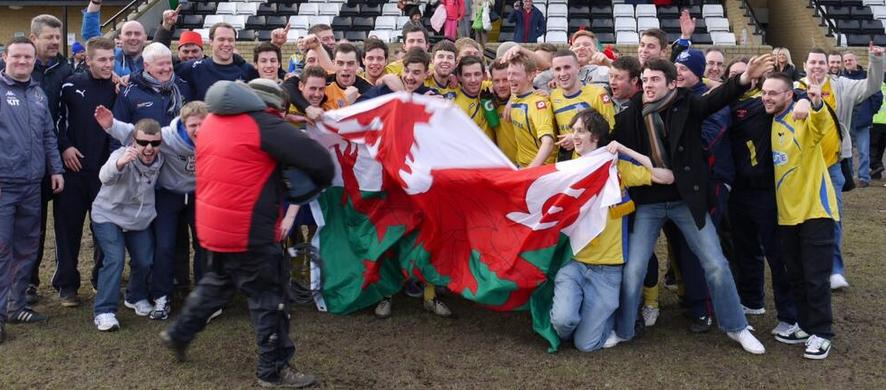
A TV cameraman records Barry fans and players celebrating after their Welsh Cup Quarter Final win at Flint Town United on 2 March 2013.

2012 marked the 100th anniversary of the club's formation, with a series of events lined up to mark this and the subsequent centenary season. To launch the festivities, the BTSC hosted Cardiff City in an August fundraising friendly attended by 2,000 spectators. However, Lovering's threats to withdraw Barry from the Welsh Football League would intensify in the weeks prior, threatening to cast a cloud over these celebrations. Nevertheless, the BTSC held a successful '100 Years of Barry Town' event at the Angel Hotel (attended by many past and present players), before the current team beat Welsh League champions Cambrian and Clydach on the 100th anniversary itself.

In March 2013, following wins against Caerleon, Penrhyncoch, Ely Rangers and Pontardawe Town, Barry won 2–0 at Flint Town United to progress to the Welsh Cup semi-final for the first time in a decade. Eventually, the team narrowly lost 1–2 to eventual winners Prestatyn Town, marking the first appearance of a fully amateur Barry side at the Welsh Cup semi-final stage.

=== Survival and resurgence ===
On 7 May 2013, Lovering withdrew the senior team from the Welsh Football League, against the will of the BTSC, players and supporters; who were ready, willing and able to fulfill the remaining two league fixtures (both against Ton Pentre). Rejecting this perceived act of sabotage, those running the football outlined their intentions to continue as they were, adopting the Barry Town United suffix to emphasise their continuing unity and endeavour. However, a meeting of the FAW Council in Betws-y-Coed in June 2013 announced that the Barry side would have to play "recreational football" henceforth; a declaration that prompted significant outcry, both locally and further afield.

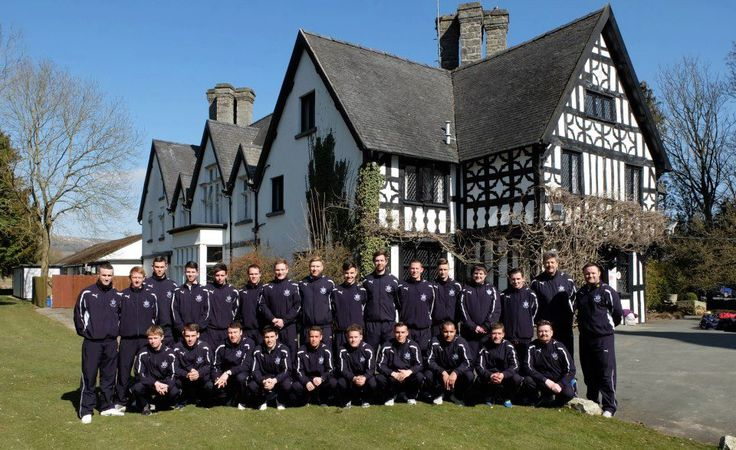
Barry at Maesmawr Hall before Welsh Cup Semi-final in Newtown.

There appeared hope for beleaguered Barry as second meeting was arranged for July 2013 at Maesmawr Hall in Caersws to hear new evidence as why the team should be able to continue on. At this second gathering, 15 of the FAW Councillors voted against discussing Barry's future, thus concluding the meeting in no more than five minutes and at considerable expense. Notably, it emerged that this decision went against the recommendations of the FAW's own Domestic Committee and legal team.

With their immediate and long-term future unclear, Barry began their pre-season with wins at Moreton and Elmore that same month, followed by a narrow 3–2 loss to Premier League newcomers Cardiff City, watched by a home crowd of 1,650 supporters on Saturday 27 July. Remarkably, given the bizarre set of circumstances, Barry had led 2–1 at half-time.

Eventually, a High Court judge in Cardiff ruled in Barry's favour; stating that the FAW Council had acted unlawfully in denying them their licence to play Welsh League football. As a result, the fan-run Town side was entered back into the structure.

In the years that have followed, Barry would win two consecutive league titles, reclaiming their place in the second tier, while continuing to develop as a club, on and off the pitch. Today, the club competes at senior, development, youth and junior levels, along with various ladies' teams and pan disability sides in the over and under-16 age groups. In the 2016–17 season, the first team reached the final of Welsh League Cup for the first time since 2001, becoming only the second side from outside the national top flight to achieve this feat since the competition was expanded several years prior. In April 2017, the club secured its return to the Welsh Premier as champions of the Welsh Football League, continuing this remarkable revival.

On Saturday 6 April 2019, a remarkable 5–2 victory at Bala Town, coupled with a 6–0 win for The New Saints away against Newtown, ensured Barry would finish at least third in the 2018–19 JD Cymru Premier and qualify for the preliminary round of the UEFA Europa League. This marked a remarkable transformation for the club, qualifying for European competition for the first time since winning the JD Cymru Premier in the 2002–03 season.

A second European appearance in as many years would follow, as Barry travelled to the Faroe Islands to play NSI Runavik in a one-legged tie, following the abandonment of the 2019–20 season in wake of the COVID-19 pandemic. However, the club's league results had begun to decline and Barry were ultimately relegated to the Cymru South in April 2022, having finished 11th out of 12 in the 2021-22 Cymru Premier. Nevertheless, the club would bounce back, with new manager Lee Kendall, a former goalkeeper at Jenner Park, guiding the team to the Cymru South championship with three games to spare.

On 25 July 2023, Kendall resigned as manager after just nine months in charge, despite signing a two-year contract with the club following their promotion back to the Cymru Premier. Kendall would be replaced by former Wales international defender Steve Jenkins.

== Colours ==
For many decades, Barry wore green as their primary colour – thought to be due to officials securing the club's first kit from Plymouth Argyle. On exile in 1992, Barri adopted a red and white strip, which would remain with them on their return to the Welsh pyramid. It was the following season that the club adopted its yellow change kit (deemed lucky for the success it brought in Welsh Cup competition) as a home strip – and it is this colour that has become synonymous with Town football, with variations including uses of blue.

Two of the club's most memorable home strips are the fluorescent lime and navy ordered in error in 2006, and the experimental claret and blue kit worn in the early 1970s – both of which saw the club simultaneously plummet in footballing fortune. Nowadays, the club tends to wear yellow at home and green on the road, though red and then grey-based kits were worn in the past few seasons.

Example of a traditional Linnets green strip, worn with longevity.
Claret and blue strip, worn for a single disastrous season (1971–72).
Green and blue strip, colour co-ordinated with Jenner Park seating.
Red and white strip, worn in exile and upon return to the Welsh pyramid.
Welsh Cup Final strip of 1994, worn in famous win over Cardiff City.
League of Wales strip, adopted from cup kit, associated with 1990s success.
Fluorescent lime strip, worn in post-Millennium descent to lowest status.

== Stadium ==
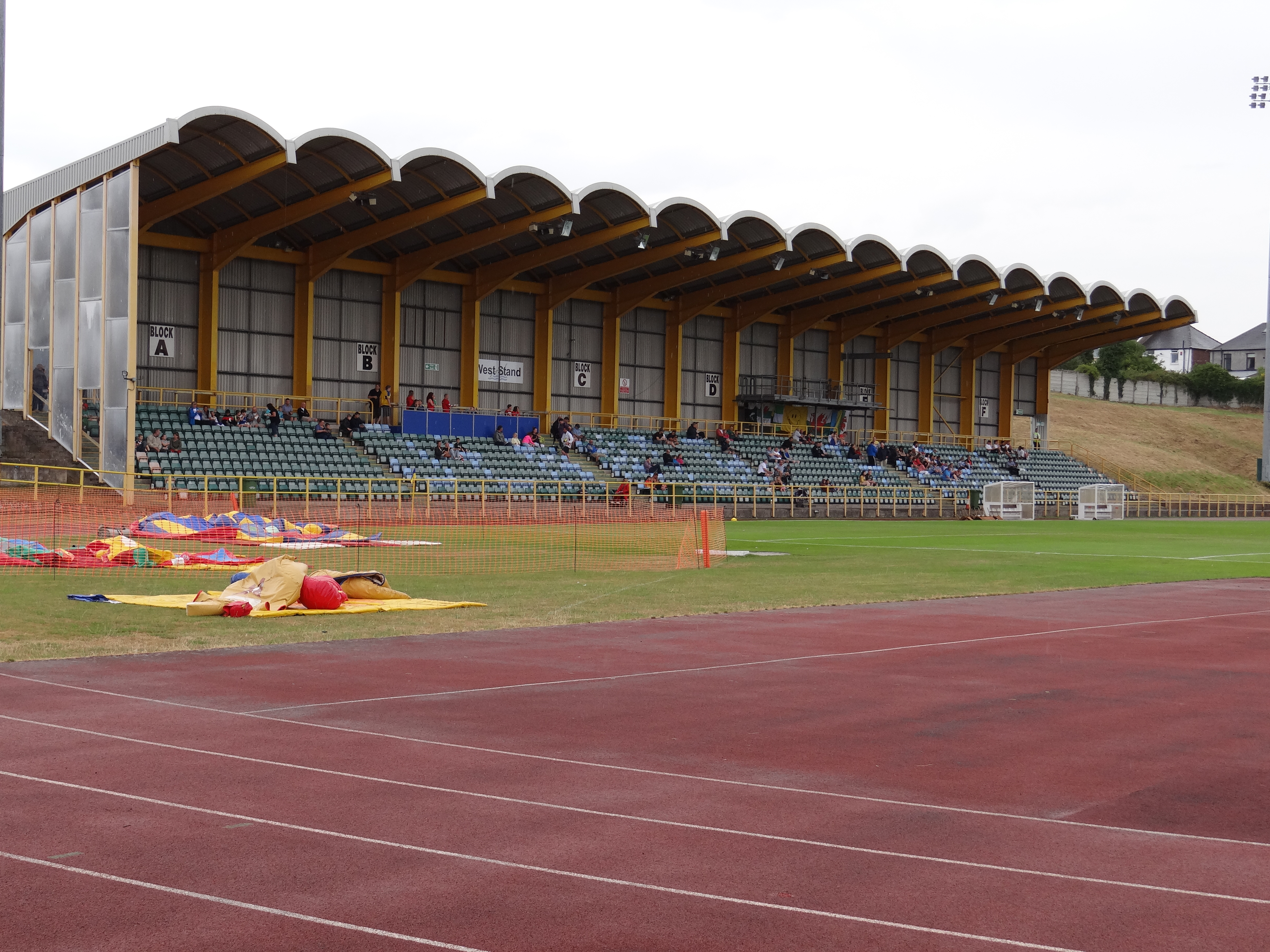
Jenner Park Stadium, Barry

Jenner Park occupies the space of land between Gladstone Road and Barry Road in central Barry and has been the setting for the evolution of Barry's senior football club for more than 100 years.

Named after the Jenner family who had gifted the land, the ground was built by the Barry football enthusiasts for their representative side to compete at the highest possible level and was completed between the landmark meeting of 1912 and the opening fixture of 1913–14.

Among the most notable Barry matches played at Jenner Park have been European ties, domestic cup finals, major semi-finals and quarter-finals, FA Cup fixtures, televised matches, testimonials, high-scoring thrillers and friendlies against high-profile opposition.

Comprised initially of two wooden stands, popular bank terracing was added in 1923 and floodlights added in the 1940s, allowing Jenner Park to host Wales' first floodlit football match between Barry and Newport in 1949–50.

During the 1980s, the local council rebuilt Jenner Park, installing a synthetic running track, a new all-seater stand and improved floodlights.

To bring Jenner Park up to UEFA standards, a second covered stand was built in the mid-1990s, boosting the seating capacity to 2,500. This was temporarily increased to 6,000+ for the visits of Aberdeen and Manchester United with the use of temporary bleachers.

Recent years have seen the addition of a special viewing area for wheelchair users in the grandstand (known colloquially as the 'Old Stand'), accessible via the stadium's Devon Avenue entrance. Meanwhile, October 2015 saw work completed on a new, state-of-the-art 3G pitch, with its inaugural game, a Welsh Cup match against Aberdare Town.

== Current squad ==
As of 10 October 2026

Note: Flags indicate national team as defined under FIFA eligibility rules; some limited exceptions apply. Players may hold more than one non-FIFA nationality.

No.	Pos.	Nation	Player
1	GK	WAL	Joe Thomas
2	MF	WAL	Michael George
3	DF	WAL	Ellis Williams
4	MF	WAL	Callum Sainty (captain)
6	DF	WAL	Keston Davies
7	FW	WAL	Noah Daley
8	MF	WAL	Daniel Barton
9	FW	ENG	Jaydn Crosbie
10	MF	ENG	Owen Brain
11	MF	WAL	Rhys Schwank
14	FW	ENG	Daniel Smith
15	MF	SKN	Theo Wharton

No.	Pos.	Nation	Player
16	DF	TTO	James Lester
17	DF	WAL	Owen Cuddihy
19	MF	WAL	Joshua Bernard
20	FW	ENG	Elliott Dugan
21	MF	WAL	Jack Shaw
23	MF	WAL	Sion Spence
24	DF	ENG	Will Richards
31	GK	WAL	George Ratcliffe
41	MF	WAL	Josef Grinter
45	MF	SWE	Abdou Njie
70	MF	WAL	Joseph Fahiya

=== Development team ===
The following players have been included in first team match day squads this season.

Note: Flags indicate national team as defined under FIFA eligibility rules; some limited exceptions apply. Players may hold more than one non-FIFA nationality.

No.	Pos.	Nation	Player
41		WAL	Josef Grinter

=== Out on loan ===
Note: Flags indicate national team as defined under FIFA eligibility rules; some limited exceptions apply. Players may hold more than one non-FIFA nationality.

No.	Pos.	Nation	Player
66	DF	WAL	Keegan Saunders (at Cardiff Draconians)

=== Technical staff ===
Position	Name
Manager	(Wales) Andy Legg
Assistant Manager	(Wales) Andrew Whittington
Head of Football	(Wales) Steve Jenkins
Coach	(Wales) Mike Cosslett
Coach	(Wales) Damian Flynn
Fitness Coach	(Wales) Gavin Beddard
Kitman	(Wales) Matthew Case

=== Notable former players ===
For all players with a Wikipedia article see Category:Barry Town United F.C. players.

== Championships ==
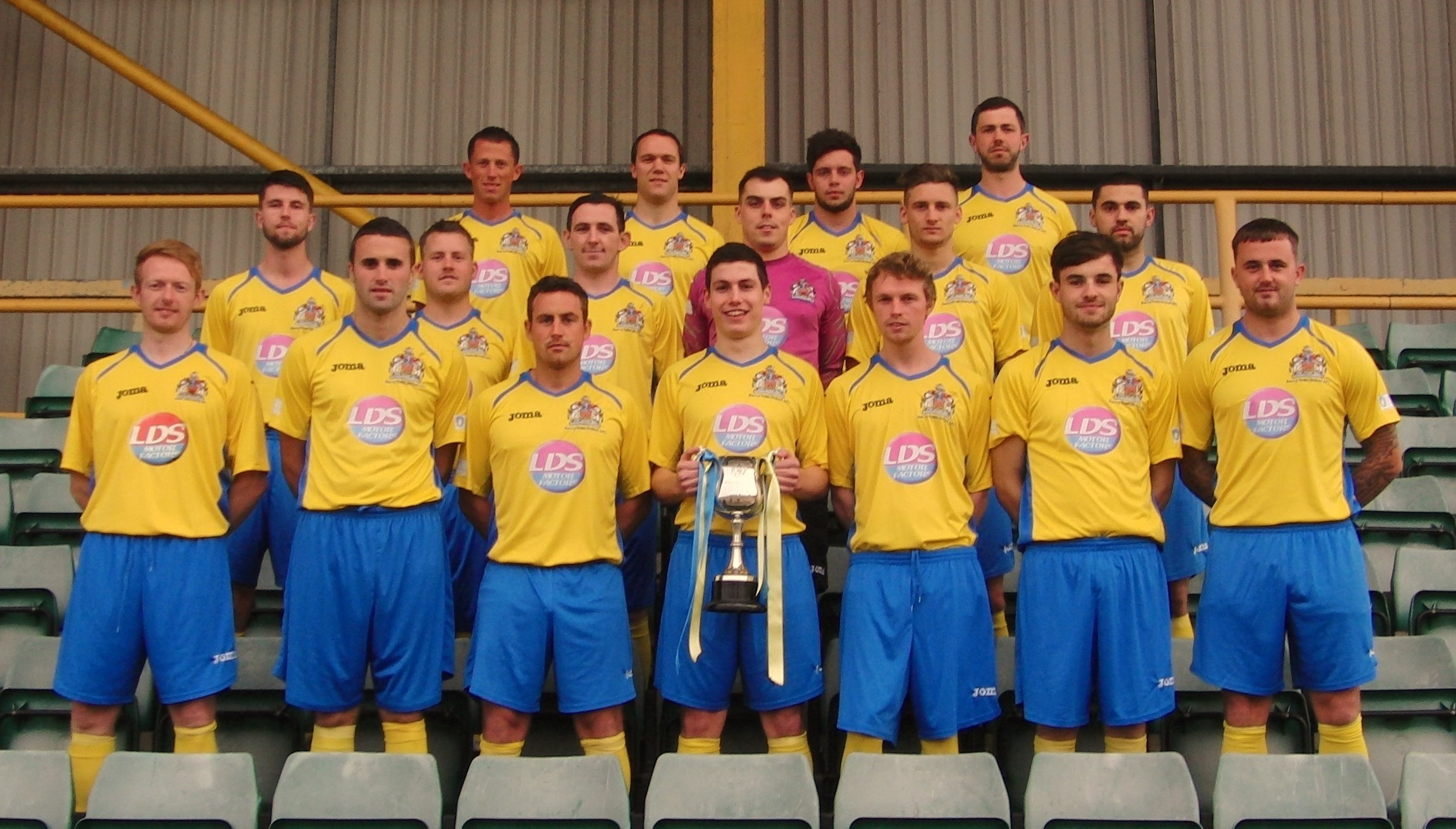
The Barry first team with the Welsh League Division Three trophy in 2014.

League of Wales / Welsh Premier League / Cymru Premier (7)
1995–96, 1996–97, 1997–98, 1998–99, 2000–01, 2001–02, 2002–03
Welsh League Division One / Cymru South (10)
1926–27, 1982–83, 1983–84, 1984–85, 1985–86, 1986–87, 1988–89, 1993–94, 2016–17, 2022–23
Welsh League Division Two (3)
1951–52, 1957–58, 2014–15
Welsh League Division Three (1)
2013–14
Southern League, Welsh Section (1)
1920–21

=== Championship seasons ===
Season	League	Pld	W	D	L	GF	GA	GD	Pts	Manager	Goalkeeper(s)	Top Goalscorer
1920–21	Southern League	20	13	4	3	35	12	+23	30	Syd Beaumont	Bill Bowen	Bill Sanders
1982–83	Welsh League Division One	34	26	3	5	103	35	+68	55	Alan Harrington	John Macey	Steve Williams
1983–84	Welsh League Division One	30	21	5	4	85	24	+61	47	Les Dickerson	Matt Simpson	Steve Williams
1984–85	Welsh League Division One	32	21	8	3	91	29	+62	71	Les Dickerson	Trevor Nott	Steve Williams
1985–86	Welsh League Division One	32	23	9	0	84	26	+58	78	Richie Morgan	Trevor Nott	Martin Goldsmith
1986–87	Welsh League Division One	32	26	5	1	81	20	+61	83	Richie Morgan	Chris Sander	Martin Goldsmith
1988–89	Welsh League Division One	32	28	4	0	96	20	+76	88	Mel Donovan	Chris Sander	Paul Evans
1993–94	Welsh League Division One	34	27	4	3	94	28	+66	85	Andy Beattie	Steve Morris	Dai Withers
1995–96	League of Wales	40	30	7	3	92	23	+69	97	Paul Giles	Mark Ovendale	Paul Hunter
1996–97	League of Wales	40	33	6	1	129	26	+103	105	Gary Barnett	Mark Ovendale	Tony Bird
1997–98	League of Wales	38	33	5	0	134	31	+103	104	Gary Barnett	Mark Ovendale	Eifion Williams
1998–99	League of Wales	32	23	7	2	82	23	+59	76	Gary Barnett	Dave Wells	Eifion Williams
2000–01	League of Wales	34	24	5	5	84	30	+54	77	Peter Nicholas	Lee Kendall/Tony Tucker	Jamie Moralee
2001–02	League of Wales	34	23	8	3	82	29	+53	77	Kenny Brown	David Forde/Simon Rayner	Jamie Moralee
2002–03	Welsh Premier League	34	26	5	3	84	26	+58	83	Kenny Brown	Abi Baruwa	Jamie Moralee
2013–14	Welsh League Division Three	36	29	3	4	116	29	+87	90	Gavin Chesterfield	Dan Bradley	Jordan Cotterill
2014–15	Welsh League Division Two	30	22	6	2	77	32	+45	72	Gavin Chesterfield	Dan Bradley	TJ Nagi
2016–17	Welsh League Division One	30	20	6	4	69	18	+51	66	Gavin Chesterfield	Mike Lewis	TJ Nagi/Drew Fahiya
2022–23	Cymru South	30	25	3	2	78	25	+53	78	Lee Kendall	Mike Lewis	Kayne McLaggon

=== Championship play-offs ===
Season	Competition	Date	Country	Club	Score	Scorers	Attendance	Venue
1920–21	Southern League	22/09/21 19/10/21	(England)	Brighton & Hove Albion	1–1 1–2	Sanders Beaumont	2,000 Unknown	Millwall Cardiff

This match pitted the winners of the Southern League's English and Welsh sections against each other to determine an overall champion.

== Cups ==
- Welsh Cup (6)
  - 1954–55, 1993–94, 1996–97, 2000–01, 2001–02, 2002–03
- Welsh League Cup (5)
  - 1996–97, 1997–98, 1998–99, 1999–2000, 2025–26
- FAW Premier Cup (1)
  - 1998–99
- FAW Trophy (1)
  - 1993–94
- Welsh League Cup (6)
  - 1934–35, 1946–47, 1978–79, 1982–83, 1986–87, 1993–94
- South Wales Senior Cup (15)
  - 1925–26, 1926–27, 1937–38, 1938–39, 1952–53, 1953–54, 1958–59, 1959–60, 1965–66, 1975–76, 1977–78, 1983–84, 1986–87, 1987–88, 1991–92
- West Wales Senior Cup (1)
  - 1927–28
- Welsh Blood Service League Cup, National (1)
  - 2022-23
- Welsh Blood Service League Cup, Southern (1)
  - 2022-23

=== Cup finals ===
Season	Competition	Date	Opponent	Score	Scorers	Attendance	Venue
1926–27	South Wales Senior Cup	02/05/27	Ebbw Vale	4–0	Brittan (2), Cowie (2, 1P)	Unknown	Barry
1927–28	West Wales Senior Cup	Unknown	Swansea Town	3–0	Condon, Brown, B. Davies	Unknown	Barry
1929–30	Welsh League Cup	28/04/30	Llanelly	0–1	N/A	Unknown	Barry
1934–35	Welsh League Cup	Unknown	Gelli Colliery	2–0	Unknown	Unknown	Treorchy
1935–36	South Wales Senior Cup	09/05/36	Swansea Town	3–0	Whitlow (2), Carless	4,500	Barry
1937–38	South Wales Senior Cup	07/05/38	Lovells Athletic	3–0	Carless (2), W. Jones	3,000	Barry
1938–39	South Wales Senior Cup	03/05/39	Swansea Town	2–0	Carless, Green	4,000	Barry
1946–47	Welsh League Cup	05/10/46	Milford United	1–0	Clayton	Unknown	Haverfordwest
1952–53	South Wales Senior Cup	09/05/53	Cardiff City	3–0	Richards, Tapscott, Dyke	4,500	Barry
1953–54	South Wales Senior Cup	08/05/54	Tonyrefail	7–0	Dyke (2), Allen, Powell, Foxton, Richards, Bright	2,600	Barry
1954–55	Welsh Cup	15/05/55 19/05/55	Chester City	1–1 4–3 (R)	Niblett Niblett (2), Goodfellow, Dyke	6,766 8,450	Wrexham Cardiff
1958–59	South Wales Senior Cup	09/05/59	Gwynfi Welfare	3–2	Sheffield (2), Bowkett	Unknown	Ton Pentre
1959–60	South Wales Senior Cup	07/05/60 29/08/60	Ton Pentre	2–2 (A) 1–0 (H)	Sheffield, Loader Sheffield	Unknown Unknown	Ton Pentre Barry
1965–66	South Wales Senior Cup	23/08/66 07/09/66	Abergavenny	3–2 (A) 2–0 (H)	Clark (2), Watkins Curtin, Bright	Unknown Unknown	Abergavenny Barry
1975–76	South Wales Senior Cup	27/04/76 03/05/76	Ferndale Athletic	1–1 (H) 2–1 (A)	D. Batt Evans (2)	Unknown Unknown	Barry Ferndale
1976–77	South Wales Senior Cup	16/05/77 23/05/77	Merthyr Tydfil	3–3 (H) 1–2 (A)	Ayres, D. Batt, Smith Ayres	Unknown Unknown	Barry Merthyr
1977–78	South Wales Senior Cup	15/05/78 18/05/78	Cardiff City	2–0 (H) 2–0 (A)	D. Batt, Hancock D. Batt, Ayres	Unknown Unknown	Barry Cardiff
1978–79	Welsh League Cup	Unknown	Pontllanfraith	0–0 AET*	N/A	Unknown	Ton Pentre
1982–83	Welsh League Cup	24/03/83	Merthyr Tydfil	2–1	Green, Griffiths	Unknown	Bridgend
1983–84	South Wales Senior Cup	30/04/84 05/05/84	Ton Pentre	7–1 (H) 2–1 (A)	Redwood (3P), Foley (2), McNeil, Griffiths Redwood (P), Smith	Unknown Unknown	Barry Ton Pentre
1986–87	Welsh League Cup	30/04/87	AFC Cardiff	2–0	Waddle, Giles	Unknown	Maesteg
1986–87	South Wales Senior Cup	18/05/87 21/05/87	Ton Pentre	2–0 (N) 2–1 (A)	Sullivan, Randall Dowd, Smith	Unknown Unknown	Cardiff Ton Pentre
1987–88	Welsh League Cup	07/04/88	Bridgend Town	0–2	N/A	Unknown	Ton Pentre
1987–88	South Wales Senior Cup	07/05/88 14/05/88	Cardiff City	3–0 (H) 2–1 (A)	Davies (2), Preece Davies, Pontin	Unknown Unknown	Barry Cardiff
1988–89	Welsh League Cup	09/05/89	Haverfordwest County	0–3	N/A	Unknown	Ebbw Vale
1991–92	South Wales Senior Cup	06/05/92	Maesteg Park	2–1	Ph. Evans, R. John	210	Bridgend
1993–94	FAW Trophy	07/05/94	Aberaman Athletic	2–1	Sanderson, Threlfall	Unknown	Porth
1993–94	Welsh Cup	15/05/94	Cardiff City	2–1	D'Auria, Hough	16,000	Cardiff
1993–94	Welsh League Cup	17/05/94	Treowen Stars	4–1	Wimbleton (2), Sanderson (2)	Unknown	Bridgend
1995–96	Welsh Cup	19/05/96	Llansantffraid	3–3 AET**	Lloyd, Pike, Bird	3,500	Cardiff
1996–97	League of Wales Cup	10/05/97	Bangor City	2–2 AET*	Ryan (2)	1,000	Aberystwyth
1996–97	Welsh Cup	18/05/97	Cwmbran Town	2–1	Griffith (2)	1,590	Cardiff
1997–98	League of Wales Cup	04/05/97	Bangor City	1–1 AET*	Jones (P)	1,000	Bangor
1998–99	League of Wales Cup	03/05/99	Caernarfon Town	3–0	Jones (3)	Unknown	Aberystwyth
1998–99	FAW Premier Cup	23/05/99	Wrexham	2–1	Perry, Barrow	3,142	Wrexham
1999–00	League of Wales Cup	01/05/00	Bangor City	6–0	Jones, P. Evans, Perry (2), Ja. Jenkins	Unknown	Aberystwyth
2000–01	League of Wales Cup	07/05/01	Caersws	0–2	N/A	820	Aberystwyth
2000–01	Welsh Cup	25/05/01	TNS	2–0	Moralee, Lloyd	1,022	Wrexham
2001–02	Welsh Cup	05/05/02	Bangor City	4–1	Moralee (2), French, Flynn	2,560	Aberystwyth
2002–03	Welsh Cup	11/05/03	Cwmbran Town	2–2 AET*	Ramasut (P), Phillips	852	Llanelli
2016–17	League of Wales Cup	21/01/17	The New Saints	0–4	N/A	1,116	Cardiff
2022-23	WBS Cup, Southern	10/04/23	Briton Ferry Llansawel	1-0	Press	926	Trefelin
2022-23	WBS Cup, National	29/04/23	Colwyn Bay	6-0	Greening, Graham, McLaggon, K. Jones, McDonald, A. Lewis	157	Newtown

== Awards ==
- BBC Wales Sport Team of the Year
  - 1996.

== European competition ==
Barry have played 27 competitive games in European club competitions; in the UEFA Champions League, UEFA Cup and Cup Winners Cup. The team has won three full qualifying ties, defeating opposition from Latvia, Hungary and Azerbaijan, in addition to single victories against FC Porto and Vardar Skopje and draws with Aberdeen, Valletta and Cliftonville. The club has scored 22 goals in regular European play, as well as four shootout penalties. Their return to European football came in the summer of 2019, after an absence of 16 seasons. They followed this up with another European tie the following summer, this time against Faroese opposition NSÍ Runavík where Kayne McLaggon became the first Barry player to score in Europe for 17 years.

Season	Competition	Round	Date	Country	Club	Score	Scorers	Attendance	City/Town
1994–95	European Cup Winners' Cup	Q	11/08/94 25/08/94	(Lithuania)	Žalgiris Vilnius	0–1 0–6	N/A N/A	1,914 2,900	Cardiff Vilnius
1996–97	UEFA Cup	1Q	17/07/96 24/07/96	(Latvia)	Dinaburg	0–0 2–1	N/A Pike, T. Evans	2,500 2,250	Barry Daugavpils
1996–97	UEFA Cup	2Q	06/08/96 20/08/96	(Hungary)	Budapest Vasutas	1–3 3–1*	T. Evans Pike (P), O' Gorman, C. Evans	2,000 2,500	Budapest Barry
1996–97	UEFA Cup	1R	10/09/96 24/09/96	(Scotland)	Aberdeen	1–3 3–3	Jones O' Gorman, Ryan (P), Bird	13,500 6,500	Aberdeen Barry
1997–98	UEFA Champions League	1Q	23/07/97 30/07/97	(Ukraine)	Dynamo Kyiv	0–2 0–4	N/A N/A	12,000 2,380	Kyiv Barry
1998–99	UEFA Champions League	1Q	22/07/98 29/07/98	(Ukraine)	Dynamo Kyiv	0–8 1–2	N/A Williams	11,800 890	Kyiv Barry
1999–00	UEFA Champions League	1Q	13/07/99 21/07/99	(Malta)	Valletta	0–0 2–3	N/A Sloan (2)	2,005 2,996	Barry Valletta
2000–01	UEFA Cup	Q	10/08/00 24/08/00	(Portugal)	Boavista	0–2 0–3	N/A N/A	3,039 1,372	Porto Barry
2001–02	UEFA Champions League	1Q	11/07/01 18/07/01	(Azerbaijan)	FK Shamkir	2–0 1–0	York, French Phillips	1,992 7,000	Barry Baku
2001–02	UEFA Champions League	2Q	25/07/01 01/08/01	(Portugal)	FC Porto	0–8 3–1	N/A Phillips, Flynn, Lloyd (P)	55,000 2,377	Porto Barry
2002–03	UEFA Champions League	1Q	17/07/02 24/07/02	(Latvia)	Skonto Riga	0–5 0–1	N/A N/A	3,500 1,507	Riga Barry
2003–04	UEFA Champions League	1Q	16/07/03 23/07/03	(North Macedonia)	Vardar Skopje	0–3 2–1	N/A Jarman, Moralee	5,000 1,400	Skopje Barry
2019–20	UEFA Europa League	PR	27/06/19 05/07/19	(Northern Ireland)	Cliftonville	0–0 0–4	N/A N/A	2,106 1,946	Cardiff Belfast
2020–21	UEFA Europa League	PR	20/08/20	(Faroe Islands)	NSÍ Runavík	1–5	McLaggon	0	Toftir

== FA Cup qualification ==
The club competed regularly in the FA Cup, prior to 1993. The table below denotes the occasions on which the team progressed through the qualifying rounds to the first round. Barry's sole second round appearance came in 1929 against Brighton and Hove Albion, after a replay win over Dagenham Town at the Boleyn Ground, home of West Ham United.

Season	Date	Round	Country	Club	Score	Scorers	Attendance
1929–30	30/11/29 04/12/29	1	(England)	Dagenham Town	0–0 1–0	N/A Jones	Unknown 6,000
1929–30	14/12/29	2	(England)	Brighton & Hove Albion	1–4	Ward	Unknown
1934–35	24/11/35	1	(England)	Northampton Town	0–1	N/A	5,327
1951–52	24/11/52	1	(Wales)	Newport County	0–4	N/A	11,844
1961–62	04/11/62 07/11/62	1	(England)	Queen's Park Rangers	1–1 0–7	Sheffield N/A	7,000 11,328
1984–85	17/11/84	1	(England)	Reading	1–2	Love	3,850

== Team records ==
Record wins
- 13–0 vs Milford United (H), Welsh League, 26 January 1985.
- 12–0 vs Cemaes Bay (H), Welsh Premier, 4 April 1998.
- 12–1 vs Bedminster (H), FA Cup, 10 October 1927.

Record defeats

- 0–11 vs Llanelly (A), Welsh League, 6 August 1961.
- 1–11 vs Newport (A), Southern League, 16 December 1932.
- 0–10 vs Bath (A), Southern League Cup, 29 August 1966.

High-scoring matches

- 10–5 vs Merthyr (A), Southern League, 19 February 1930.
- 6–6 vs Gillingham (H), Southern League, 15 March 1947.
- 6–6 vs Bristol Rovers (A), Southern League, Date unknown.

== Full internationals ==
Pos.	Player
GK	(Wales) Andy Dibble
GK	(Wales) Len Evans
GK	(Wales) Ron Howells
GK	(Wales) Graham Vearncombe

Pos.	Player
DF	(Wales) Terry Boyle
DF	(Wales) Don Dearson
DF	(Wales) Steve Derrett
DF	(Wales) Phil Dwyer
DF	(Wales) Bob John
DF	(Wales) Keith Pontin
DF	(Wales) Dave Roberts
DF	(Wales) Alf Sherwood
DF	(Wales) Nigel Stevenson

Pos.	Player
MF	(Wales) Bryn Allen
MF	(Wales) David Cotterill
MF	(Wales) John Emanuel
MF	(Wales) David Giles
MF	(Wales) Robbie James
MF	(Wales) Billy Jennings
MF	(Wales) Chris Marustik
MF	(Wales) Ivor Powell
MF	(Wales) Gil Reece
MF	(Wales) Ted Vizard

Pos.	Player
FW	(Wales) George Baker
FW	(Wales) Alan Curtis
FW	(Wales) Nick Deacy
FW	(Wales) Leslie Jones
FW	(Wales) Stan Richards
FW	(Wales) Derek Showers
FW	(Wales) Derek Tapscott
FW	(Wales) Dai Ward Jr.
FW	(Wales) Fred Warren

Pos.	Player
GK	(Nigeria) Abiodun Baruwa
GK	(Republic of Ireland) David Forde
DF	(Pakistan) Atif Bashir
DF	(Northern Ireland) Paul Ramsay
MF	(Sweden) Bengt Berndtsson
MF	(Northern Ireland) Jackie Brown
MF	(Finland) Stig Holmqvist
MF	(Finland) Hannu Kankkonnen
MF	(Finland) Rolf Rosqvist
MF	(Saint Kitts and Nevis) Theo Wharton
FW	(Antigua and Barbuda) Nathaniel Jarvis

== Hall of Fame ==
The club's Hall of Fame was established by the Barry Town Supporters Committee in the 2011–12 season to celebrate the achievements of past players, managers and other influential figures. Further additions are set to be made each year.

Year	Name	Position	Significant achievements	Years of service	Other notable clubs
2012–13	Chris Mason	Defender	A POW in WW2, amassed 400+ appearances either side of war.	1937–1951	
2012–13	Ashley Griffiths	Defender	22-year association, appearances in finals, Europe and FA Cup	1973–2005	Bristol Rovers
2014–15	James Wightman	Captain	First club captain and decorated victim of World War I.	1913-14	
2012–13	Neil O' Halloran	Various	Player, boss and chairman, launched an era of success	1958–1996	Newport County, Cardiff City
2012–13	Charlie Dyke	Right-wing	Welsh Cup winner in 1955, associated with club forty years on.	1951–1964	Chelsea
2012–13	The Batt Brothers	Various	John/"Percy" and Richard/"Dicky", the club's most famous siblings.	1972–1980	Merthyr Tydfil
2012–13	Bill Bowen	Goalkeeper	Goalkeeper, manager and secretary in inaugural era of success.	1919–1927	
2012–13	Derek Tapscott	Forward	Barry-born Welsh international who found fame with Arsenal.	1949–1953	Arsenal, Cardiff City
2011–12	Bill Jones	Manager	Manager in the golden 1950s, played before and after war.	1934–1953	Notts County, Worcester City
2011–12	Mark Ovendale	Goalkeeper	Record-setting keeper, 1000+ league minutes without conceding.	1995–1998, 2003	AFC Bournemouth, Luton Town
2011–12	Eifion Williams	Forward	Record signing, dynamic first Champions League goalscorer.	1997, 1999	Torquay United, Hartlepool United
2011–12	Fred Whitlow	Forward	Three stints, with two-season spell of 13 hat-tricks and 100+ goals.	1922–23, 24–25, 35–37	Charlton Athletic, Exeter City
2011–12	Ernie Carless	Forward	Barry-born footballer and cricketer, played in four decades.	1929–1953	Cardiff City, Plymouth Argyle
2011–12	Dai Ward	Forward	Top marksman for eight seasons with over 300 goals.	1926–1935	Cardiff City, Newport County
2011–12	Johnny Gardner	Defender	500+ appearances, including in FA Cup first and second rounds.	1921–1932	
2011–12	Clive Ayres	Forward	Goalscorer. 46 goals in one season and three straight hat-tricks.	1972–1978	Cheltenham Town
2011–12	Basil Bright	Manager	One-man dynasty as player/coach, signed many key players.	1951, 1952–67, 1971–78	Stoke City, Tottenham Hotspur
2011–12	Stan Richards	Forward	130 goals in 174 outings, set scoring records everywhere.	1952–1955	Cardiff City, Swansea City
2011–12	Gwilym Cain	Forward	Dubbed 'Cannonball' for penalty prowess, scored over 150 goals.	1947–1956, 1960	Cardiff City, Haverfordwest County
2011–12	Stanley Cowie	Defender	Key part of Barry's only Southern League title-winning side.	1920–1927	Blackpool, Exeter City
2012–13	Steve Williams	Forward	Trophy-winning goalscorer, netting 166 times in 230 appearances.	1982–85, 89–90, 94–95	Bristol Rovers, Bideford
2012–13	Gary Barnett	Manager	Player-manager for European wins, brought passing philosophy	1996–99	Coventry City, Fulham
2012–13	Gary Lloyd	Defender	Free-kick specialist, with European appearances and Wales call-up	1994–2003	Llanelli, Carmarthen Town
2012–13	Ken Gully	Forward	Prolific Barry goalscorer in Welsh and English leagues alike.	1960–65	Kettering Town
2012–13	Mike Cosslett	Defender	Defender and coach, 40+-year association with the club.	1974–	Aberystwyth Town, Weymouth
2012–13	Bobby Smith	Midfielder	True clubman, over 500+ outings across a 20-year stint.	1975–94	
2013–14	Billy Jennings	Manager	First Barrian to be capped for Wales, managed Barry twice.	1930–49	Bolton Wanderers, Cardiff City
2013–14	Derek Redwood	Defender	All-time leading penalty taker, won much silverware in the 1980s.	1980s	
2016–17	George Green	Defender	International, Wembley goalscorer, first Welshman to play in Spain.	1930s	Espanyol, Charlton Athletic
2022–23	Idris Niblett	Forward	Town's only Barry-born Welsh Cup Final goalscorer, netting three in 1955.	1951-1962	Cardiff City, Hereford United
2017–18	Dan Bradley	Goalkeeper	Goalkeeper, Barry's all-time record Welsh League appearance holder.	2006–2017	

== Women's football ==
Barry Town United Women play in the Adran Premier League, the highest tier of league competition in Welsh women's football. They are also based at Jenner Park Stadium.

== Other information ==
- The paperback book The Linnets – An Illustrated, Narrative History of Barry Town AFC, 1888–1993 by Jeff McInery was published in 1993, and is available locally.
- A number of fanzines devoted to the club have been published, including The Unofficial Programme, 38 Hours From Vilnius, Yma O Hyd and Keep It Going, Cohen.
