= Chris Sander (footballer) =

Welsh footballer (born 1962)

Personal information
- Full name: Christopher Andrew Sander
- Date of birth: 11 November 1962 (age 63)
- Place of birth: Swansea, Wales
- Height: 6 ft 0 in (1.83 m)
- Position: Goalkeeper

Senior career*
Years	Team	Apps	(Gls)
1979–1985	Swansea City	20	(0)
1984	→ Wrexham (loan)	8	(0)
1985	Cardiff City	5	(0)
1985–1986	Haverfordwest County		
1986	Cardiff City	5	(0)
1986–1989	Barry Town	102	(0)
1989	Aberystwyth Town		
- * Club domestic league appearances and goals

Christopher Andrew Sander (born 11 November 1962) is a Welsh former professional footballer. During his career, he made 38 appearances in the Football League during spells with Swansea City, Wrexham and Cardiff City. He also played for Welsh clubs Haverfordwest County, Barry Town and Aberystwyth Town.

== Career ==
Born in Swansea, Sander represented Wales at youth level before beginning his career with his hometown club Swansea City after leaving school. After turning professional in November 1979, he made his league debut for the club in May 1982 during a 3–0 defeat to Aston Villa. He struggled to maintain a first-team place at the club, competing with Dai Davies and Jimmy Rimmer, but helped the club win the Welsh Cup in 1983 and played in their UEFA Cup Winners' Cup victory over Maltese side Sliema Wanderers. He spent a brief spell on loan with Wrexham during the 1984–85 season, making five league appearances as injury cover for Stuart Parker, before leaving to join Third Division side Cardiff City in August 1985.

Sander made his debut for Cardiff in the opening match of the 1985–86 season during a 4–1 victory over Notts County on 17 August 1985. However, he was dropped from the side after four matches in favour of Mel Rees and, despite making four further appearances, he was released by the club in December 1985 after the club signed Lee Smelt. He joined Haverfordwest County, also gaining employment as a computer programmer, but a number of injuries to Cardiff's goalkeepers saw the club re-sign Sander on non-contract terms. He played in five matches, including becoming the first Cardiff goalkeeper to save two penalties in the same match during a 1–1 draw with Walsall in April 1986, before being released for a second time as the club suffered relegation. He later spent more than four seasons with Barry Town, making over 100 appearances, before playing for Aberystwyth Town.

== Honours ==
Swansea City

- Welsh Cup winner: 1983
