= James Lester (footballer) =

Trinidadian footballer (born 2007)

Personal information
- Date of birth: 10 November 2006 (age 19)
- Place of birth: Swansea, Wales
- Height: 1.88 m (6 ft 2 in)
- Position: Centre-back

Team information
- Current team: Barry Town United
- Number: 16

Youth career
- 2014–2024: Cardiff City

Senior career*
Years	Team	Apps	(Gls)
2024–2026	Llanelli Town	44	(0)
2026–	Barry Town United	14	(2)

International career^{‡}
2026–	Trinidad and Tobago	1	(0)
- * Club domestic league appearances and goals as of 07:48, 8 November 2026 (UTC) ‡ National team caps and goals as of 20:05, 21 April 2026 (UTC)

James Lester (born 10 November 2006) is a professional footballer who plays as a centre-back for Cymru Premier club Barry Town United. Born in Wales, he plays for the Trinidad and Tobago national team.

== Club career ==
A youth product of Cardiff City since the age of 8, Lester signed as a first year scholar with the club on 27 July 2023. He joined Llanelli Town in the Cymru South in 2024 and helped them win the 2024–25 Cymru South and earned promotion to the Cymru Premier.

In summer 2026 he moved to Barry Town United.

== International career ==
Lester was born in Wales, and is of Trinidadian descent through a grandfather. He was called up to the Trinidad and Tobago national team for a set of friendlies in March 2026. He debuted with Trinidad and Tobago as a substitute in a friendly 3–0 loss to Bolivia on 15 March 2026.

== Honours ==
Llanelli Town

- Cymru South: 2024–25
