= Richard Jones (footballer, born 1969) =

Welsh footballer

Personal information
- Full name: Richard John Jones
- Date of birth: 26 April 1969 (age 57)
- Place of birth: Usk, Wales
- Position: Midfielder

Senior career*
| Years | Team | Apps | (Gls) |
| 1986–1988 | Newport County | 40 | (1) |
| 1988–1993 | Hereford United | 148 | (9) |
| 1993–1994 | Swansea City | 7 | (0) |
| 1994–2001 | Barry Town | 198 | (45) |
| 2001 | Merthyr Tydfil | 12 | (0) |
| 2001–2002 | Haverfordwest County | 6 | (0) |

Managerial career
- 1999–2000: Barry Town
- * Club domestic league appearances and goals

Richard Jones (born 26 April 1969 in Usk) is a Welsh former footballer who made nearly 200 appearances in the Football League playing as a midfielder for Newport County, Hereford United and Swansea City. He then spent six seasons with Barry Town, including one season as player-manager, and also played for Merthyr Tydfil and Haverfordwest County.
