= Scotland national football team home stadium =

Primary home stadium for the Scotland national football team

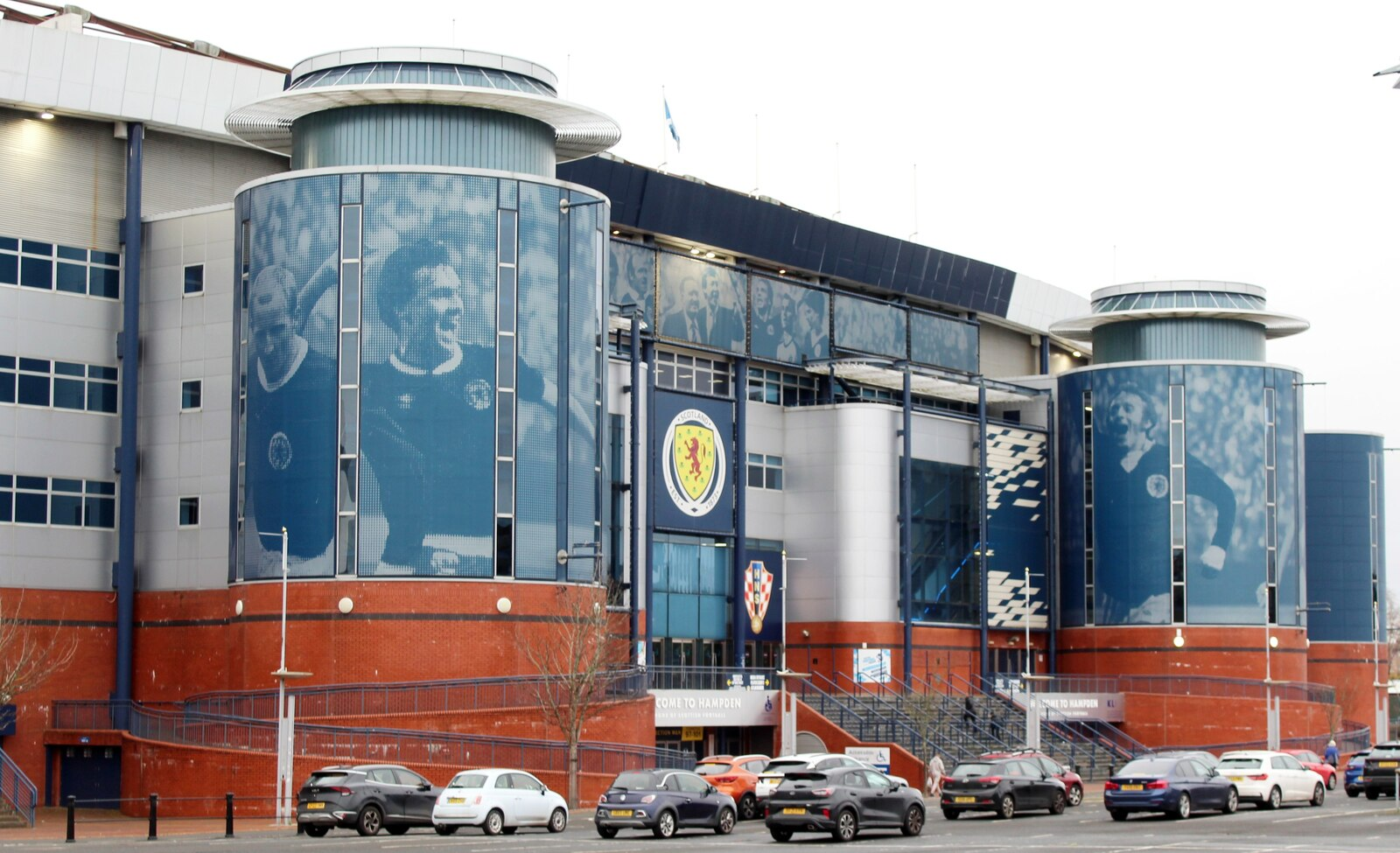
Exterior of Hampden Park

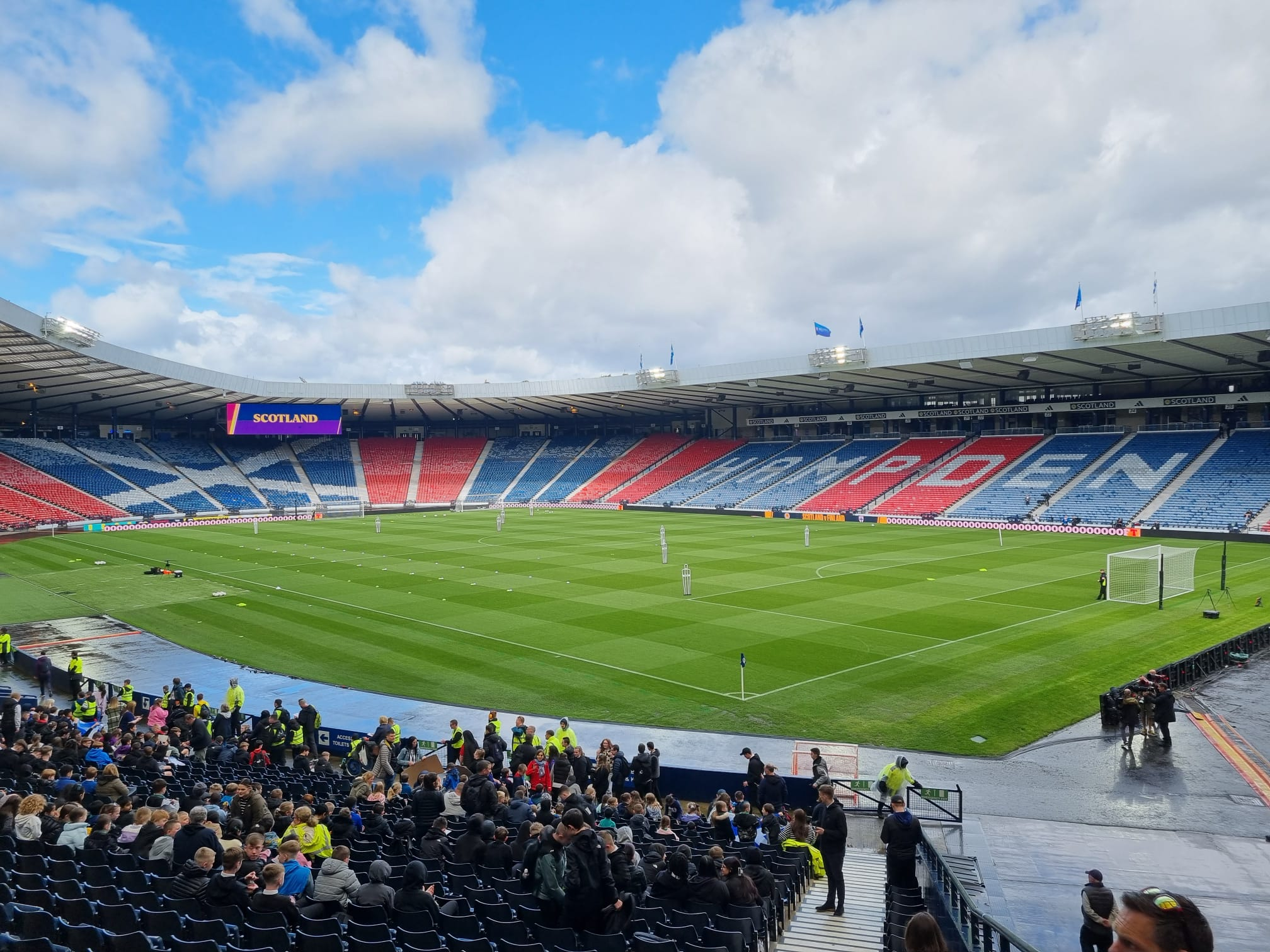
Interior of Hampden Park

Hampden Park in Glasgow is the primary home stadium for the Scotland national football team. This has been the case since 1906, soon after it opened. The present site of Hampden Park is the third location to bear that name and both the previous locations also hosted Scotland games. Scotland have also played many of their home games in other stadiums throughout their history, both in friendly matches and for competitive tournaments.

== History ==
=== Early history ===
Scotland hosted the first official international match, a goalless draw against England on 30 November 1872, at the Hamilton Crescent cricket ground in Glasgow. This venue was used for four Scotland matches between then and 1876. The next venue to be used was the first Hampden Park, home of Queen's Park. It hosted the first ever Scottish Cup Final in 1874 and a Scotland v England match in 1878. Queen's Park left this site in 1883 because of a proposal to extend the Cathcart District Railway line through the site.

Queen's Park then moved to a second Hampden Park, which hosted internationals between 1885 and 1890. The first match hosted outside Glasgow was at Hibernian Park in Edinburgh on 10 March 1888. This started a trend of smaller venues outside Glasgow being used for some of the less attractive fixtures, particularly against Wales. The more attractive match against rivals England was always played in Glasgow, which had the largest stadiums. During the 1890s and early 1900s most of the Scotland fixtures were played either at Celtic Park or Ibrox Park, as Rangers and Celtic competed to host the lucrative match against England. The present site of Ibrox Park was opened in 1899 and it hosted a Scotland match for the first time in 1902, but a collapse in the wooden terracing resulted in the first Ibrox disaster, during which 25 fatalities and nearly 600 injuries were suffered.

The loss of Scotland games to the other venues in Glasgow forced Queen's Park to consider increasing the capacity of the second Hampden. In the late 1890s, Queen's Park requested more land for development, but this was refused by the landlords. The club acquired a new site, the present site of Hampden Park, from Henry Erskine Gordon in 1899. The third Hampden opened in October 1903, while the second Hampden was taken over by Third Lanark and renamed Cathkin Park. The third Hampden hosted its first international in 1906. It expanded to the point where it set world record attendances between the 1900s and 1930s. Even as late as 1970, Hampden set a record attendance for a UEFA competition match, the 1969–70 European Cup semi-final second leg between Celtic and Leeds United.

=== Modern developments ===
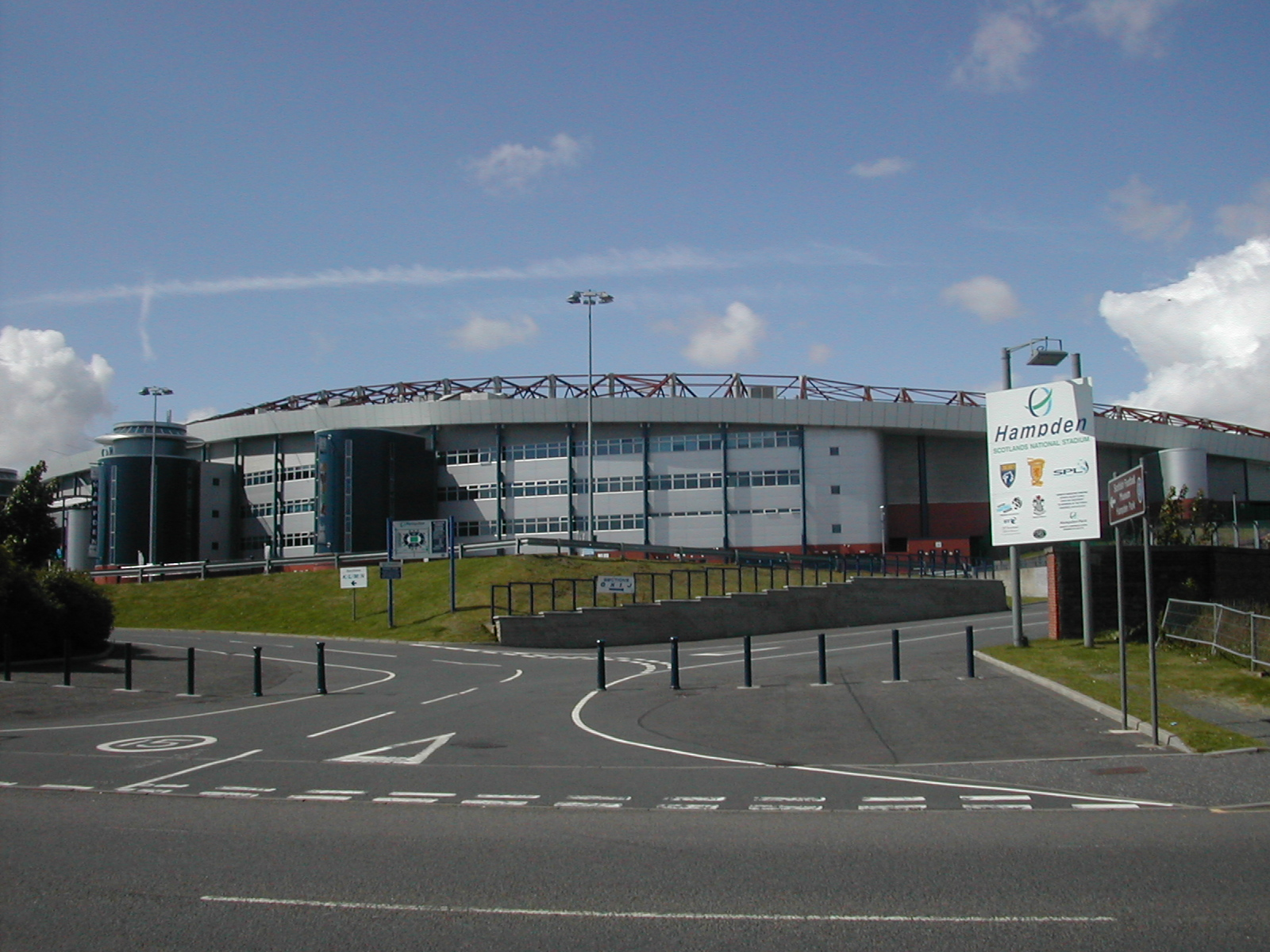
Part of the stadium in 2004

Hampden continued to be the main home stadium for the Scotland national team until the early 1990s. It then required significant redevelopment to become an all-seater stadium, meeting the requirements of the Taylor Report. Ibrox Park and Pittodrie Stadium in Aberdeen had both been largely redeveloped before then and hosted some of the 1994 FIFA World Cup qualification matches.

Hampden re-opened in 1994 and was used for the UEFA Euro 1996 qualifying matches. It then had to be closed again as the main (south) stand was replaced and a variety of venues were used for 1998 FIFA World Cup qualification and UEFA Euro 2000 qualifying matches, including Ibrox, Pittodrie, Celtic Park, Rugby Park in Kilmarnock and Tynecastle in Edinburgh. The fully redeveloped Hampden was re-opened in 1999 and hosted the later Euro 2000 qualifiers, including the first leg of the play-off against England. Hampden has hosted the clear majority of Scotland matches since 1999 and almost all competitive games. Some friendlies have been moved to smaller venues outside Glasgow, usually either Pittodrie or Easter Road in Edinburgh. Hampden was closed for a year due to its use as an athletics stadium in the 2014 Commonwealth Games.

The lease that the SFA held on Hampden was due to expire in 2020, and this led to Celtic (Celtic Park), Rangers (Ibrox) and the Scottish Rugby Union (Murrayfield) making offers to become the regular home of the Scotland team. In September 2018, the SFA instead announced an agreement to purchase Hampden from Queen's Park. This deal was completed in August 2020. A year later, Hampden also became the regular home venue for the Scotland women's national team.

== List of stadiums used for home games ==
Number of matches	Stadium	Town/City	First international	Opponent	Last international	Opponent
290	Hampden Park (Note: There have been three sites called 'Hampden Park'. The first is now the site of the Hampden Bowling Club. The second Hampden Park was renamed New Cathkin Park when Queen's Park FC moved to the current site of Hampden Park and Third Lanark AC moved in, bringing the 'Cathkin Park' name from their old home.)	Glasgow	7 April 1906	England	13 November 2026	North Macedonia
24	Celtic Park (Note: There have been two sites called 'Celtic Park'. Celtic FC first established a Celtic Park in 1888, but moved to a different site in 1892 when their rent was increased.)	Glasgow	25 March 1893	Ireland	18 November 2014	England
18	Ibrox Stadium (Note: There have been two sites called 'Ibrox Park'. Rangers FC first established an Ibrox Park in 1889, but moved to a different site (adjacent to the previous) in 1899. The total for the current Ibrox does not include what should have been its first international in 1902 when the first Ibrox disaster occurred, as the match was later declared void and replayed at Villa Park.)	Glasgow / Govan (Note: The burgh of Govan became part of the city of Glasgow in 1912.)	15 March 1909	Ireland	11 October 2014	Georgia
15	Pittodrie Stadium	Aberdeen	3 February 1900	Wales	9 November 2017	Netherlands
9	Tynecastle Park	Edinburgh	26 March 1892	Wales	9 May 2003	New Zealand
7	Easter Road (Note: The match played against Wales on 10 March 1888 at the Hibernian FC ground was played at Hibernian Park. This is not the present site of Easter Road stadium, which opened in 1892.)	Edinburgh	22 April 1998	Finland	22 March 2017	Canada
6	First Hampden Park	Crosshill (Note: The burgh of Crosshill became part of the city of Glasgow in 1891.)	2 March 1878	England	25 March 1882	Wales
6	Second Hampden Park	Crosshill	14 March 1885	Ireland	5 April 1890	England
4	Hamilton Crescent	Partick (Note: The burgh of Partick became part of the city of Glasgow in 1912.)	30 November 1872	England	25 March 1876	Wales
4	Rugby Park	Kilmarnock	24 March 1894	Wales	27 May 1997	Wales
3	Dens Park	Dundee	12 March 1904	Wales	2 December 1936	Wales
3	First Ibrox Park	Govan	9 March 1889	Ireland	27 March 1897	Ireland
2	First Cathkin Park	Crosshill	15 March 1884	England	29 March 1884	Wales
1	Cappielow	Greenock	15 March 1902	Wales	15 March 1902	Wales
1	Carolina Port	Dundee	21 March 1896	Wales	21 March 1896	Wales
1	Fir Park	Motherwell	19 March 1898	Wales	19 March 1898	Wales
1	Firhill Stadium	Glasgow	25 February 1928	Ireland	25 February 1928	Ireland
1	First Celtic Park	Glasgow	28 March 1891	Ireland	28 March 1891	Ireland
1	Hibernian Park	Edinburgh	10 March 1888	Wales	10 March 1888	Wales
1	Love Street	Paisley	17 March 1923	Wales	17 March 1923	Wales
1	Underwood Park	Paisley	22 March 1890	Wales	22 March 1890	Wales

== See also ==
- List of football stadiums in Scotland
- List of Scottish Football League stadiums
- List of Scottish Premier League stadiums
- List of Scottish Professional Football League stadiums
- Scottish football attendance records
- Scottish stadium moves
