= List of Scottish Premier League stadiums =

The Scottish Premier League (SPL) was the highest level of the Scottish football league system between 1998 and 2013. During this period matches were played at 19 football stadiums. The inaugural round of SPL matches took place on the weekend of 1–2 August 1998, with five clubs hosting the opening fixtures. The league ceased after the 2012–13 Scottish Premier League season, when the SPL and Scottish Football League merged to form the Scottish Professional Football League.

Following the Hillsborough Disaster in 1989, the Taylor Report recommended the abolition of standing terraces by the start of the 1994–95 season, to be replaced by all-seater stadiums. In addition to this, the SPL initially demanded that all its stadia should have a minimum capacity of 10,000 seats, but later reduced that figure to 6,000. When Falkirk finished in a potential promotion position in 2000 and 2003, the SPL refused admission to membership because their Brockville Park did not have sufficient seating capacity. The SPL subsequently allowed Inverness Caledonian Thistle and Gretna to groundshare with other clubs. Some clubs promoted from the First Division, such as Hamilton Academical and Ross County, undertook ground improvements to meet the SPL criteria before entering the league.

The home stadiums of the Old Firm clubs, Celtic and Rangers, were amongst the largest stadiums in the United Kingdom. The other large stadium in Glasgow, Hampden Park, was never used for an SPL match because it is the home ground of amateur club Queen's Park, who have not been in the top flight of Scottish football since 1958. None of the other stadiums used for SPL matches had a capacity greater than 22,199 (Pittodrie Stadium in Aberdeen). This reflected the gap in attendances between the Old Firm and other Scottish football clubs. In the 2011–12 Scottish Premier League season, Celtic and Rangers both had average attendances of over 45,000, while no other club had an average attendance of greater than 14,000.

== Stadiums ==
Stadium	Image	Club(s)	Location	Opened	Closed	Period(s) used for SPL matches	Coordinates	Refs
Almondvale Stadium		Livingston & Gretna	Livingston	1995	—	2001–2006; 2008	55°53′10″N 003°31′22″W	
Caledonian Stadium		Inverness Caledonian Thistle	Inverness	1996	—	2005–2009; 2010–2013	57°29′41″N 004°13′03″W	
Celtic Park		Celtic	Glasgow	1892	—	1998–2013	55°50′59″N 004°12′20″W	
Dens Park		Dundee	Dundee	1899	—	1998–2005; 2012–2013	56°28′31″N 002°58′23″W	
East End Park		Dunfermline Athletic	Dunfermline	1885	—	1998–1999; 2000–2007; 2011–2012	56°04′31″N 003°26′31″W	
Easter Road		Hibernian	Edinburgh	1893	—	1999–2013	55°57′42″N 003°09′56″W	
Falkirk Stadium		Falkirk	Falkirk	2004	—	2005–2010	56°00′18″N 003°45′15″W	
Fir Park		Motherwell & Gretna	Motherwell	1895	—	1998–2013	55°46′48″N 003°58′48″W	
Firhill Stadium		Partick Thistle	Glasgow	1909	—	2002–2004	55°52′54″N 004°16′11″W	
Ibrox Stadium		Rangers	Glasgow	1899	—	1998–2012	55°51′12″N 004°18′33″W	
Love Street		St Mirren	Paisley	1894	2009	2000–2001; 2006–2009	55°51′10″N 004°25′43″W	
McDiarmid Park		St Johnstone	Perth	1989	—	1998–2002; 2009–2013	56°24′35″N 003°28′37″W	
New Douglas Park		Hamilton Academical	Hamilton	2001	—	2008–2011	55°46′56″N 004°03′31″W	
Pittodrie Stadium		Aberdeen & Inverness Caledonian Thistle	Aberdeen	1899	—	1998–2013	57°09′33″N 002°05′20″W	
Rugby Park		Kilmarnock	Kilmarnock	1899	—	1998–2013	55°36′15″N 004°30′29″W	
St Mirren Park		St Mirren	Paisley	2009	—	2009–2013	55°51′02″N 004°26′38″W	
Tannadice Park		Dundee United	Dundee	1883	—	1998–2013	56°28′29″N 002°58′08″W	
Tynecastle Stadium		Heart of Midlothian	Edinburgh	1886	—	1998–2013	55°56′21″N 003°13′56″W	
Victoria Park		Ross County	Dingwall	1929	—	2012–2013	57°35′45″N 004°25′08″W	

== See also ==
- List of football stadiums in Scotland
- List of Scottish Football League stadiums
- List of Scottish Professional Football League stadiums
- Scottish football attendance records
- Scottish stadium moves
