= List of Scottish Professional Football League stadiums =

In Scotland there is one national association football league, the Scottish Professional Football League (SPFL). The SPFL was formed in 2013 by the merger of the Scottish Premier League and the Scottish Football League. The SPFL consists of 42 clubs and has four divisions, named the Premiership, Championship, League One and League Two. Below this there are two regional leagues (Highland Football League and Lowland Football League), with a promotion and relegation play-off between the regional leagues and the national league. This article lists stadiums that have been used for SPFL matches.

== Stadiums ==
Stadium	Image	Club(s)	Location	Opened	Closed	Period(s) used for SPFL matches	Capacity	Coordinates	Refs
Ainslie Park		Edinburgh City; The Spartans	Edinburgh	2008	—	2017–2022; 2023–present	3,500	55°58′17.69″N 003°13′59.58″W	
Almondvale Stadium		Livingston	Livingston	1995	—	2013–present	8,716	55°53′10″N 003°31′22″W	
Balmoor Stadium		Peterhead	Peterhead	1997	—	2013–present	3,150	57°30′42″N 001°47′45″W	
Balmoral Stadium		Cove Rangers	Aberdeen	2018	—	2019–present	2,602	57°06′39.20″N 2°06′00.25″W	
Bayview Stadium		East Fife	Methil	1998	—	2013–present	1,980	56°11′19″N 002°59′56″W	
Borough Briggs		Elgin City	Elgin	1921	—	2013–present	4,520	57°39′07″N 003°19′15″W	
Broadwood Stadium		Clyde	Cumbernauld	1994	—	2013–2022	8,086	55°56′41″N 004°02′14″W	
Caledonian Stadium		Inverness Caledonian Thistle	Inverness	1996	—	2013–present	7,512	57°29′41″N 004°13′03″W	
Cappielow		Greenock Morton	Greenock	1879	—	2013–present	11,589	55°56′29″N 004°43′37″W	
Celtic Park		Celtic	Glasgow	1892	—	2013–present	60,411	55°50′59″N 004°12′20″W	
Central Park		Cowdenbeath	Cowdenbeath	1917	—	2013–2022	4,309	56°06′31″N 003°20′50″W	
Cliftonhill		Albion Rovers	Coatbridge	1919	—	2013–2023	1,238	55°51′37″N 004°00′41″W	
Dens Park		Dundee	Dundee	1899	—	2013–present	11,775	56°28′31″N 002°58′24″W	
Dumbarton Football Stadium		Dumbarton	Dumbarton	2000	—	2013–present	2,020	55°56′18″N 004°33′41″W	
East End Park		Dunfermline	Dunfermline	1885	—	2013–present	11,480	56°04′31″N 003°26′31″W	
Easter Road		Hibernian	Edinburgh	1893	—	2013–present	20,421	55°57′42″N 003°09′56″W	
Excelsior Stadium		Airdrieonians; Queen's Park	Airdrie	1998	—	2013–present	10,101	55°51′35″N 003°57′35″W	
Falkirk Stadium		Falkirk; Queen's Park	Falkirk	2004	—	2013–present	7,937	56°00′18″N 003°45′15″W	
Fir Park		Motherwell	Motherwell	1895	—	2013–present	13,677	55°46′48″N 003°58′48″W	
Firhill Stadium		Partick Thistle	Glasgow	1909	—	2013–present	10,102	55°52′54″N 004°16′11″W	
Forthbank Stadium		Stirling Albion	Stirling	1993	—	2013–present	3,808	56°07′08″N 003°54′42″W	
Galabank		Annan Athletic	Annan	1953	—	2013–present	2,504	54°59′41″N 003°15′41″W	
Gayfield Park		Arbroath	Arbroath	1925	—	2013–present	6,600	56°33′08″N 002°35′29″W	
Glebe Park		Brechin City	Brechin	1919	—	2013–2021	4,083	56°44′07″N 002°39′23″W	
Hampden Park		Queen's Park	Glasgow	1903	—	2013–2021; 2023–2025	51,866	55°49′33″N 004°15′07″W	
Ibrox Stadium		Rangers	Glasgow	1899	—	2013–present	51,700	55°51′12″N 004°18′33″W	
K-Park		East Kilbride	East Kilbride		—	2025–present		55°45′0″N 004°8′49″W	
Lesser Hampden		Queen's Park	Glasgow	1925	—	2025–present	990	55°49′32″N 004°15′20″W	
Links Park		Montrose	Montrose	1887	—	2013–present	4,936	56°42′50″N 002°27′33″W	
McDiarmid Park		St Johnstone	Perth	1989	—	2013–present	10,696	56°24′35″N 003°28′37″W	
Meadowbank Stadium		Edinburgh City	Edinburgh	1970	—	2016–2017; 2022–present	500	55°57′25″N 003°09′31″W	
Murrayfield Stadium		Heart of Midlothian	Edinburgh	1925	—	2017	67,144	55°56′32″N 003°14′27″W	
New Central Park		Kelty Hearts	Kelty	1979	—	2021–present	2,181	56°08′09″N 003°22′43″W	
New Douglas Park		Hamilton Academical	Hamilton	2001	—	2013–present	6,018	55°46′56″N 004°03′31″W	
New Dundas Park		Bonnyrigg Rose	Bonnyrigg		—	2022–2025	2,200	55°52′29″N 003°6′12″W	
Ochilview Park		Stenhousemuir; East Stirlingshire	Stenhousemuir	1890	—	2013–present	3,746	56°01′42″N 003°48′53″W	
Palmerston Park		Queen of the South	Dumfries	1919	—	2013–present	8,690	55°04′11″N 003°37′30″W	
Pittodrie Stadium (Note: A new Aberdeen Stadium is proposed for development.)		Aberdeen	Aberdeen	1899	—	2013–present	20,866	57°09′33″N 002°05′20″W	
Recreation Park		Alloa Athletic	Alloa	1895	—	2013–present	3,100	56°07′00″N 003°46′43″W	
Rugby Park		Kilmarnock	Kilmarnock	1899	—	2013–present	15,003	55°36′15″N 004°30′29″W	
Shielfield Park		Berwick Rangers	Berwick-upon-Tweed	1954	—	2013–2019	4,099	55°45′36″N 002°00′57″W	
Somerset Park		Ayr United	Ayr	1888	—	2013–present	10,185	55°28′10″N 004°37′12″W	
St Mirren Park		St Mirren	Paisley	2009	—	2013–present	7,937	55°51′02″N 004°26′38″W	
Stair Park		Stranraer	Stranraer	1907	—	2013–present	4,178	54°54′07″N 005°00′45″W	
Stark's Park		Raith Rovers	Kirkcaldy	1891	—	2013–present	8,867	56°05′59″N 003°10′06″W	
Station Park		Forfar Athletic	Forfar	1888	—	2013–present	6,777	56°39′08″N 002°53′06″W	
Tannadice Park		Dundee United	Dundee	1883	—	2013–present	14,223	56°28′29″N 002°58′08″W	
Tynecastle Park		Heart of Midlothian	Edinburgh	1886	—	2013–present	19,852	55°56′21″N 003°13′56″W	
Victoria Park		Ross County	Dingwall	1929	—	2013–present	6,541	57°35′45″N 004°25′08″W	

== See also ==
- List of football stadiums in Scotland
- List of Scottish Football League stadiums
- List of Scottish Premier League stadiums
- Scotland national football team home stadium
- Scottish football attendance records
- Scottish stadium moves
