= List of Scottish Football League stadiums =

The Scottish Football League (SFL) was a league featuring professional and semi-professional football clubs, mostly from Scotland. From its foundation in 1890 until the breakaway Scottish Premier League (SPL) was formed in 1998, the SFL represented the top level of football in Scotland. After 1998, the SFL represented levels 2 to 4 of the Scottish football league system. In June 2013, the SFL merged with the SPL to form the Scottish Professional Football League. The SFL was played out in a wide variety of stadiums, ranging from the stadiums of Glasgow giants Celtic and Rangers to the intimate surroundings of Cliftonhill and Dumbarton Football Stadium, with capacities of just over 2000.

== Founding Members, 1890–1891 ==
Stadiums marked in bold are the stadiums used during the inaugural season of the Scottish Football League.

Stadium	Location	Team	Opened	Closed	Demo'd	Years hosting League Football	Current Status
**Boghead Park**	Dumbarton	Dumbarton	1879	2000	Unknown	1890–2000	Near junction of Round Riding Road and Miller Street; now a residential development
Dumbarton Football Stadium	Dumbarton	Dumbarton	2000	----	----	2000–present	
**Ibrox Park I**	Govan	Rangers	1887	1899	Unknown	1890–1899	Was replaced by Ibrox II, built just to the west. Now an office building, parking, and a row of residential tenements along Copland Road.
Ibrox Park II	Glasgow	Rangers	1899	----	----	1899–present	
**Celtic Park I**	Glasgow	Celtic	1888	1892	Unknown	1890–1892	Was replaced by Celtic Park II, built just to the west. Now waste ground, just north of Janefield Street and cut through by Springfield Gardens.
Celtic Park II	Glasgow	Celtic	1892	----	----	1892–present	
**Whitefield Park**	Cambuslang	Cambuslang	1888	1897	Unknown	1890–1892	Now occupied by residential properties and Whitefield Bowling Club
**Cathkin Park**	Crosshill	Third Lanark	1872	1903	Unknown	1890–1903	Now occupied by residential tenements, located at the north east corner of Dixon Road and Cathcart Road, cut through by Boyd Street
New Cathkin Park	Glasgow	Third Lanark	1903	1967	Unknown	1904–1967	Still in use as a municipal playing field, some overgrown terracing remains visible.
**Tynecastle Park**	Edinburgh	Heart of Midlothian	1886	----	----	1890–present	
**Underwood Park**	Paisley	Abercorn	1889	1899	Unknown	1890–1899	Site just north of Underwood Road, and to the south west of the Greenock Branch rail line; since replaced by commercial and industrial properties.
Old Ralston Park	Paisley	Abercorn	1899	1909	Unknown	1899–1909	Near junction of Glasgow Road and East Lane; site now occupied by office buildings.
New Ralston Park	Paisley	Abercorn	1909	1920	Unknown	1909–1915	Near junction of Glasgow Road and East Lane; site now occupied by office buildings.
**Westmarch**	Paisley	St Mirren	1883	1894	Unknown	1890–1894	Exact location uncertain, but area is occupied by industrial units and possibly by St Mirren Park
Love Street	Paisley	St Mirren	1894	2009	2010	1894–2009	Site is derelict; awaiting residential development.
St Mirren Park	Paisley	St Mirren	2009	----	----	2009–present	Still in use.
**Millburn Park**	Alexandria	Vale of Leven	1890	----	----	1890–1892, 1905–1915, 1921–1926	Still in use by the West of Scotland Football League side Vale of Leven.
**Springvale Park**	Glasgow	Cowlairs	1890	1895	Unknown	1890–1891, 1893–1895	At Cowlairs junction, between the Edinburgh & Glasgow railway and the Sighthill Branch. Both rail lines are still there, but the adjacent Cowlairs station is long gone. The site is now occupied by Network Rail offices and associated parking.
**Tontine Park**	Renton	Renton	1872	1897	Unknown	1890, 1891–1897	Under modern Tontine Park housing development.

== New members, 1891–1900 ==
Stadium	Location	Club	Opened	Closed	Demo'd	Years hosting League football	Current status
Bank Park	Leith	Leith Athletic	1891	1899	Unknown	1891–1899	Just to the north east of Easter Road Stadium, now occupied by residential properties and municipal playing fields.
Hawkhill	Leith	Leith Athletic	1899	1900	Unknown	1899–1900	At junction of Restalrig Road and the former Leith railway line; site now occupied by residential units, centred on Restalrig Park
Chancelot Park	Leith	Leith Athletic	1900	1904	Unknown	1900–1904	Now Lethem Park, a private park situated just off Bonar Place.
Old Logie Green	Leith	Leith Athletic	1904	1926	Unknown	1904–1915, 1924–1926	Next to the Water of Leith, at the junction of Logie Green Road and Warriston Road; now occupied by commercial properties and parking, including a major home improvement chain.
New Powderhall	Edinburgh	Leith Athletic	1927	1928	Unknown	1927–1928	Adjacent to Old Logie Green, at the end of Beaverhall Road, now occupied by residential properties.
Marine Gardens	Portobello	Leith Athletic	1928	1936	Unknown	1928–1936	On corner of King's Road and Seafield Road; site now occupied by a bus terminal.
Old Meadowbank	Edinburgh	Leith Athletic	1936	1953	Unknown	1936–1939, 1947–1953	Adjacent to New Meadowbank, roughly on the site of the field hockey pitch.
New Meadowbank	Edinburgh	Leith Athletic	1946	1947	Unknown	1946–1947	Site is occupied by the current Meadowbank Stadium.
Barrowfield Park	Glasgow	Clyde	1891	1898	Unknown	1891–1898	On corner of Carstairs Street and what is now Colvend Street; occupied by waste ground and light industrial units.
Shawfield Stadium	Rutherglen	Clyde	1898	1986	–	1898–1986	Now used for greyhound racing.
Broadwood Stadium	Cumbernauld	Clyde	1994	–	–	1994–present	Still in use.
West Craigie Park	Dundee	Dundee	1893	1893	Unknown	1893	Unknown
Carolina Port	Dundee	Dundee	1893	1899	Unknown	1893–1899	Unknown
Dens Park	Dundee	Dundee	1899	–	–	1899–present	Still in use.
Easter Road	Edinburgh	Hibernian	1893	–	–	1893–present	Still in use.
Dalziel Park	Motherwell	Motherwell	1893	1895	Unknown	1893–1895	At Airbles Street and Glencairn Street; now occupied by housing.
Fir Park	Motherwell	Motherwell	1895	–	–	1895–present	Still in use.
Inchview	Partick	Partick Thistle	1885	1897	Unknown	1893–1897	In Whiteinch; approximately the location of the Clyde Tunnel northern entrance.
Meadowside	Partick	Partick Thistle	1897	1908	1910	1897–1908	On south side of Castlebank Street; site subsequently occupied by granaries, now residential properties.
Firhill	Glasgow	Partick Thistle	1909	–	–	1909–present	Still in use.
Clune Park	Port Glasgow	Port Glasgow Athletic	1893	1911	Unknown	1893–1911	Unknown
Cappielow	Greenock	Morton	1879	–	–	1893–present	Still in use.
Hyde Park	Glasgow	Northern	1893	1894	Unknown	1893–1894	On south side of Flemington Street, to the east of Springburn Road; the site is now occupied by North Glasgow College, some residential properties, and Ayr Street.
Braehead Park	Glasgow	Thistle	1893	1894	Unknown	1893–1894	On south bank of the Clyde, adjacent to Hutchesontown Bowling Club; site is now occupied by residential units, centred around Dolphington Avenue.
New Logie Green	Edinburgh	St Bernard's	1893	1900	Unknown	1893–1900	
New Powderhall	Edinburgh	St Bernard's	1900	1901	Unknown	1900–1901	
Royal Gymnasium Ground	Edinburgh	St Bernard's	1880	1943	Unknown	1900–1915, 1924–1939	Just north of Royal Crescent; site now occupied by parking.
Broomfield Park	Airdrie	Airdrieonians	1892	1994	1994	1894–1994	Directly to east of Gartlea Roundabout; site now occupied by a supermarket and parking.
East Dock Street	Dundee	Dundee Wanderers			Unknown	1894	
Clepington Park	Dundee	Dundee Wanderers	1894	1895	Unknown	1894–1895	Was taken over and rebuilt by Dundee Hibernian; renamed Tannadice. Still in use.
Rugby Park	Kilmarnock	Kilmarnock	1877	–	–	1877–present	Still in use
Govandale Park	Govan	Linthouse	1894	1900	Unknown	1895–1900	Between Govan Road and the River Clyde beside Govan Old Parish Church; now apartments (Wanlock Street).
Somerset Park	Ayr	Ayr	1888	–	–	1897–present	Still in use.
Douglas Park	Hamilton	Hamilton Academical	1888	1994	1994	1897–1994	Adjacent to New Douglas Park; site now occupied by a supermarket.
New Douglas Park	Hamilton	Hamilton Academical	2001	–	–	2001–present	Still in use.
Merchiston Park	Bainsford	East Stirlingshire	Unknown	1921	Unknown	1900–1921	Just to the north of the Forth and Clyde Canal and to the west of Main Street; the park was moved at some point in the early 1900s to make way for a railway line. Sites are now occupied by residential and commercial properties.
Firs Park	Falkirk	East Stirlingshire	1921	2008	2012	1921–2008	Just at the end of Firs Street; site now derelict and awaiting residential development.
Hampden Park I	Glasgow	Queen's Park	1884	1903	Unknown	1900–1903	Became Cathkin Park, home of Third Lanark. Now a municipal park.
Hampden Park II	Glasgow	Queen's Park	1903	–	–	1903–2021	Still in use as national stadium; the SFA purchased the ground from Queen's Park, with the club playing their last home fixture there in March 2021.

== New members, 1901–1910 ==
Stadium	Location	Team	Opened	Closed	Demo'd	Years hosting League Football	Current Status
Dunterlie Park I	Barrhead	Arthurlie	1882	1906	Unknown	1901–1906	Located just off Glasgow Road in Barrhead; site now occupied by residential units, particularly houses on Rufflees Avenue.
Dunterlie Park II	Barrhead	Arthurlie	1906	1919	Unknown	1906–1919	
Dunterlie Park III	Barrhead	Arthurlie	1919	----	----	1923–1929	Still in use.
Brockville Park	Falkirk	Falkirk	1885	2003	2003	1902–2003	Located on Hope Street in Falkirk; site now occupied by a supermarket.
Falkirk Stadium	Falkirk	Falkirk	2004	----	----	2003–present	Still in use.
Stark's Park	Kirkcaldy	Raith Rovers	1891	----	----	1902–present	Still in use.
Beresford Park	Ayr	Ayr Parkhouse	1888	1910	Unknown	1903–1904, 1906–1910	Located to the east of Beresford Terrace, just south of the Burns Statue; site now occupied by commercial properties, and bisected by Parkhouse Street.
Meadow Park	Whifflet	Albion Rovers	1885	1919	Unknown	1903–1915	Located just east of the railway line and south of Calder Street; site now occupied by waste ground and an electrical substation.
Cliftonhill	Coatbridge	Albion Rovers	1919	----	----	1919–present	Still in use.
Pittodrie	Aberdeen	Aberdeen	1903	----	----	1904–present	Still in use.
North End Park	Cowdenbeath	Cowdenbeath	Unknown	1917	Unknown	1905–1915	Located just south of Perth Road and east of High Street; site is still in use as a municipal playing field.
Central Park	Cowdenbeath	Cowdenbeath	1917	----	----	1921–present	Still in use.
Tannadice Park	Dundee	Dundee Hibernian	1917	----	----	1921–present	Still in use.
Somerset Park	Ayr	Ayr United	1910	----	----	1910–present	Still in use.

== New members, 1911–1920 ==
Stadium	Location	Club	Opened	Closed	Demo'd	Years hosting League football	Current status
Recreation Grounds	Perth	St Johnstone	1885	1924	Unknown	1911–24	Located between Edinburgh Road and the railway line, just west of the prison; site now occupied by residential and commercial units.
Muirton Park	Perth	St Johnstone	1924	1989	1989	1924–89	Located at the junction of Dunkeld Road and Florence Place; site now occupied by a supermarket.
McDiarmid Park	Perth	St Johnstone	1989	----	----	1989–present	Still in use.
East End Park I	Dunfermline	Dunfermline Athletic	1885	1920	Unknown	1912–20	Located just to the west of the current stadium; now occupied by parking.
East End Park II	Dunfermline	Dunfermline Athletic	1920	----	----	1920–present	Still in use.
Newfield Park	Johnstone	Johnstone	1894	1927	Unknown	1912–15, 1921–26	Located on the north side of the town, at the junction of Barrochan Road and the A737; site now occupied by a slip road for the A737.
Clydeholm	Clydebank	Clydebank (1914)	1914	1931	Unknown	1914–15, 1917–31	Located on the corner of Mill Road and Glasgow Road; site now occupied by apartment blocks.
Recreation Park	Cowdenbeath	Lochgelly United	1910	1928	1934	1914–15, 1921–26	Housing

== New members, 1921–1930 ==
Stadium	Location	Team	Opened	Closed	Demo'd	Years hosting League Football	Current Status
Recreation Park	Alloa	Alloa Athletic	1895	----	----	1921–present	Still in use.
Volunteer Park	Armadale	Armadale	1910	1932	Unknown	1921–1932	Still in use, by Armadale Thistle junior team.
Mill Park	Bathgate	Bathgate	1904	1935	Unknown	1921–1929	Located at the junction of Cochrane Street and Mill Road; now occupied by residential properties and Marmion Road.
Newtown Park	Bo'ness	Bo'ness	1986	1945	Unknown	1921–1932	Still in use (by Bo'ness United).
Sports Park	Broxburn	Broxburn United	1912	1932	Unknown	1921–1926	Located on Church Street; now occupied by a sports centre and parking.
Bayview Park	Methil	East Fife	1903	1998	Unknown	1921–1998	Located at junction of Kirland Road and Wellesley Road; now occupied by housing.
Bayview Stadium	Methil	East Fife	1998	----	----	1998–present	Still in use.
Ochilview Park	Stenhousemuir	Stenhousemuir	1890	----	----	1921–present	Still in use.
Station Park	Forfar	Forfar Athletic	1880	----	----	1921–present	Still in use.
Gayfield Park I	Arbroath	Arbroath	1880	1925	Unknown	1921–1925	Unknown, partly covered by Gayfield Park II.
Gayfield Park II	Arbroath	Arbroath	1925	----	----	1925–present	Still in use.
Forthbank Park	Stirling	King's Park	1875	1940	Unknown	1921–1940	Located just to the east of the railway line and to the north of Springbank Road; now occupied by waste ground and light industrial units.
Duckburn Park	Dunblane	King's Park				1921	Used by King's Park for a single match after Forthbank Park was closed due to crowd trouble.
Chapelhill Park	Clackmannan	Clackmannan	1886	1931	Unknown	1921–22, 1923–1926	Located at corner of Chapelhill and Wellmyre; occupied by residential properties.
Ardencaple Park	Helensburgh	Helensburgh	1896	1928	----	1923–1926	Located just to the north of Helensburgh cricket ground, just off Rhu Road Higher; site is still in use as a rugby field.
Parkside	Shotts	Dykehead	Unknown	----	----	1923–1926	Still in use (for youth football).
Raploch Park	Larkhall	Royal Albert	Unknown	Unknown	Unknown	1923–1926	Located to the north of Raploch Street, opposite Larkhall Thistle's Gasworks Park ground; site now occupied by residential properties.
Kintail Park	Lockerbie	Mid-Annandale	Unknown	Unknown	Unknown	1923–1926	Located just north of Livingstone Place and south of the former railway line; site now occupied by housing and Kintail Park street.
Links Park	Montrose	Montrose	1887	----	----	1923–1926, 1929–present	Still in use.
Glebe Park	Brechin	Brechin City	1919	----	----	1923–1926, 1929–present	Still in use.
Kimmeter Park Green	Annan	Solway Star	1911	1947	Unknown	1923–1926	Located just to the east of the junction of the B6357 and the B721; now occupied by farmland.
Bellsdale Park	Beith	Beith	1919	1938	Unknown	1923–1926	Still in use (by Beith Juniors).
Whitestone Park	Peebles	Peebles Rovers	Unknown	----	----	1923–1926	Still in use.
Portland Park	Galston	Galston	1894	1940	Unknown	1923–1926	Located at the junction of Titchfield Street and the A71; now occupied by the A71 and farmland.
Meadow Park	Dumbarton	Dumbarton Harp	1894	1925	Unknown	1923–1924	Located on the corner of what is now Poplar Road and Overburn Avenue; now occupied by industrial properties.
Palmerston Park	Dumfries	Queen of the South	1919	----	----	1923–present	Still in use.
Crawick Holm	Sanquhar	Nithsdale Wanderers	Unknown	Unknown	Unknown	1923–1927	Unknown, probably located near where the A76 crosses Crawick Water.

== New members, 1931–2010 ==
Stadium	Location	Team	Opened	Closed	Demo'd	Years hosting League Football	Current Status
Powderhall Stadium	Edinburgh	Edinburgh City	1931	Unknown	Unknown	1931-Unknown	Situated adjacent to Old Logie Green, at the end of Beaverhall Road, now occupied by residential properties.
City Park	Edinburgh	Edinburgh City	Unknown	----	----	Unknown-1949	Unknown.
Annfield Stadium	Stirling	Stirling Albion	1945	1993	Unknown	1946–1993	Located near junction of Livilands Lane and St Ninians Road; site now occupied by housing and by streets named Annfield Gardens and Annfield Grove.
Forthbank Stadium	Stirling	Stirling Albion	1993	----	----	1993–present	Still in use.
Shielfield Park	Berwick-upon-Tweed	Berwick Rangers	1954	----	----	1955–present	Still in use.
Kilbowie Park	Clydebank	Clydebank (1965)	1939	1996	1997	1964–65, 1966–97	Located to the north of the rail line and west of Argyll Road; site now occupied by commercial properties and parking.
Stair Park	Stranraer	Stranraer	1907	----	----	1955–present	Still in use.
Meadowbank Stadium	Edinburgh	Meadowbank Thistle	1974	----	----	1974–1995	Still in use (as an athletics stadium).
Telford Street Park	Inverness	Inverness Caledonian Thistle	1926 (as Caledonian F.C.)	1996	1996	1994–1996	Located near junction of Telford Street and Dunain Road; site now occupied by an electronics store and parking.
Caledonian Stadium	Inverness	Inverness Caledonian Thistle	1996	----	----	1996–present	Still in use.
Victoria Park	Dingwall	Ross County	1929	----	----	1994–present	Still in use.
Almondvale Stadium	Livingston	Livingston	1995	----	----	1995–present	Still in use.
Borough Briggs	Elgin	Elgin City	1921	----	----	2000–present	Still in use.
Balmoor Stadium	Peterhead	Peterhead	1997	----	----	2000–present	Still in use.
Raydale Park	Gretna	Gretna	1946	----	----	2002–2008	Still in use.
Galabank	Annan	Annan Athletic	1953	----	----	2008–present	Still in use.

== See also ==
- List of football stadiums in Scotland
- List of Scottish Premier League stadiums
- List of Scottish Professional Football League stadiums
- Scottish football attendance records
- Scottish stadium moves
