= History of the Scotland national football team =

Overview of Scotland at football

The history of the Scotland national football team dates back to the first ever international football match in 1872. Until the Second World War, Scotland mainly competed against the other Home Nations in the British Home Championship, with the most keenly contested fixture being the match with England. The Scottish Football Association, which governs the team, joined the international governing body FIFA in 1910, but along with the other Home Nations withdrew from FIFA in 1928. This meant that Scotland did not participate in the World Cups of 1930, 1934 or 1938. The Home Nations rejoined FIFA after the Second World War and Scotland then started to participate in international competitions. Scotland have since participated in nine World Cups and four European Championship tournaments, but have never progressed beyond the first stage.

== Early history (1872–1939) ==
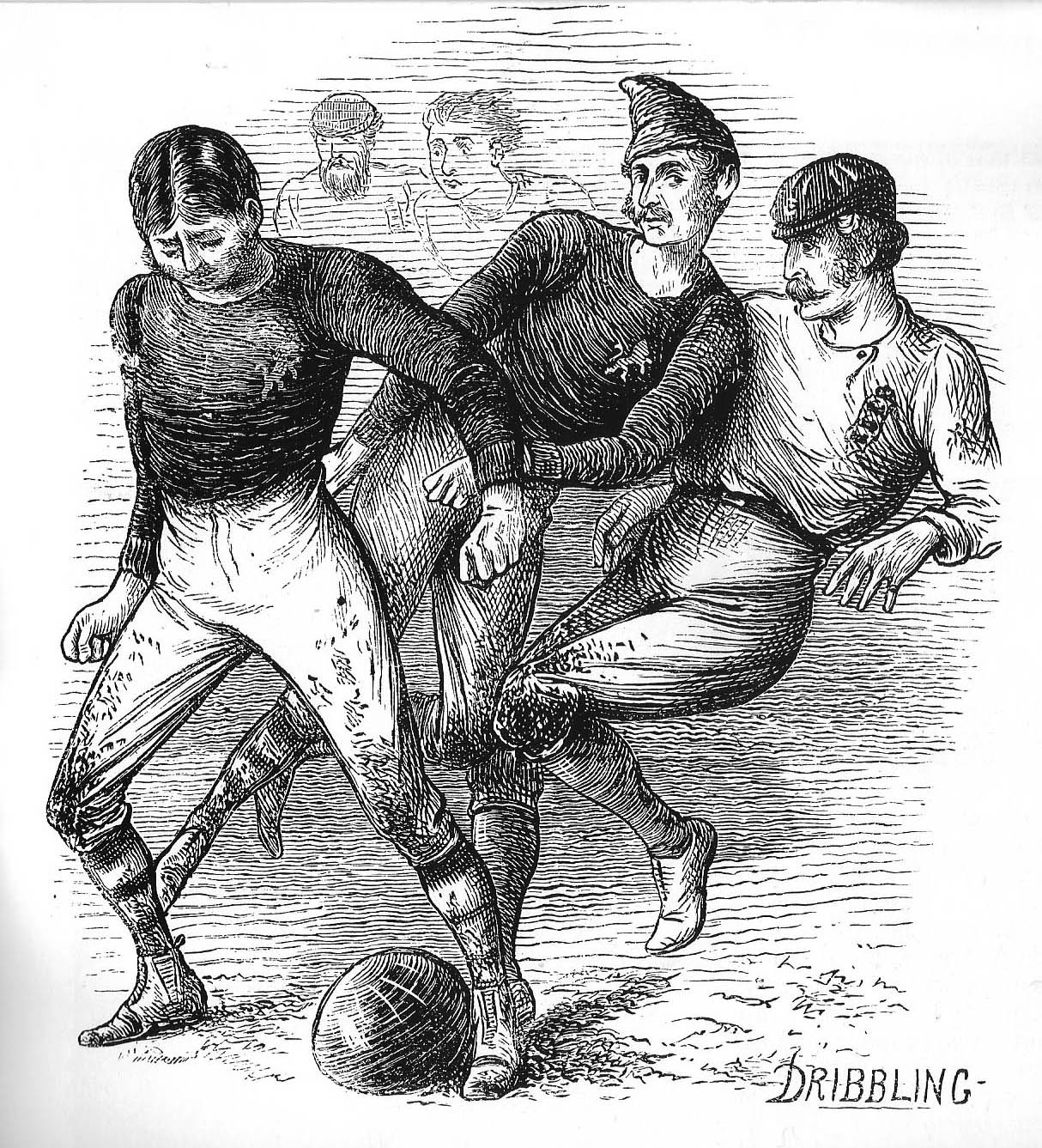
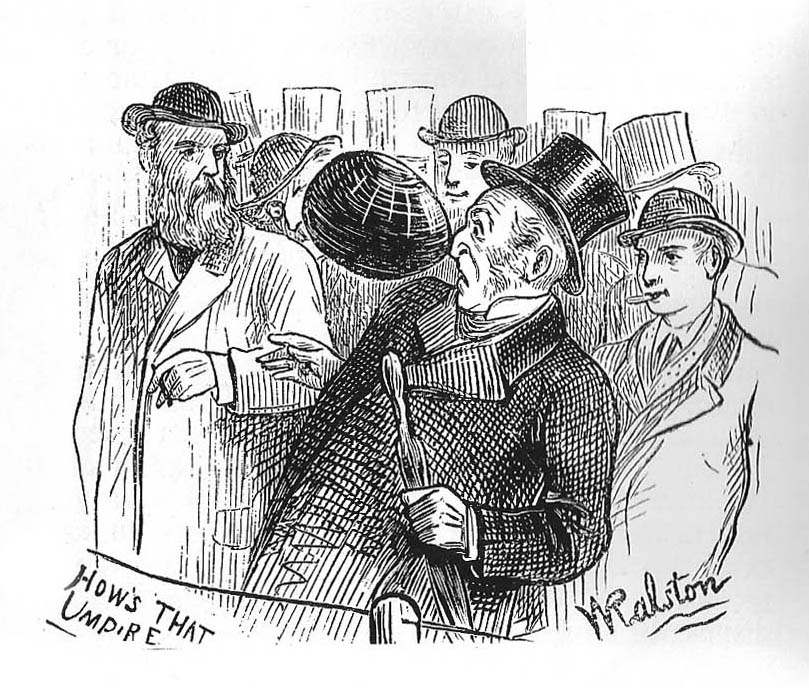
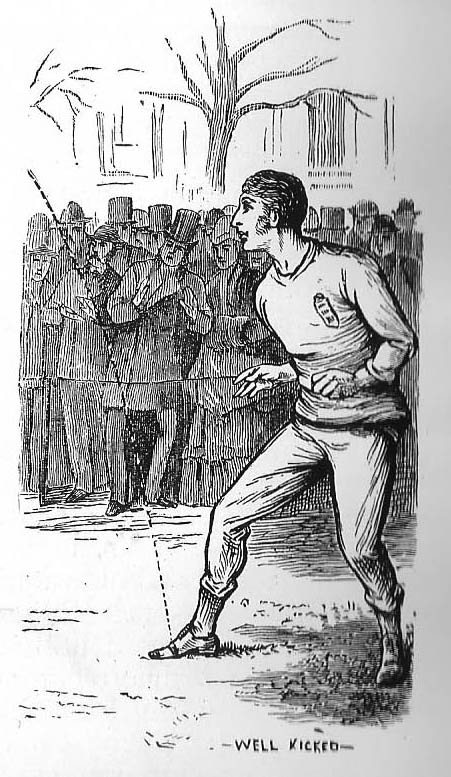
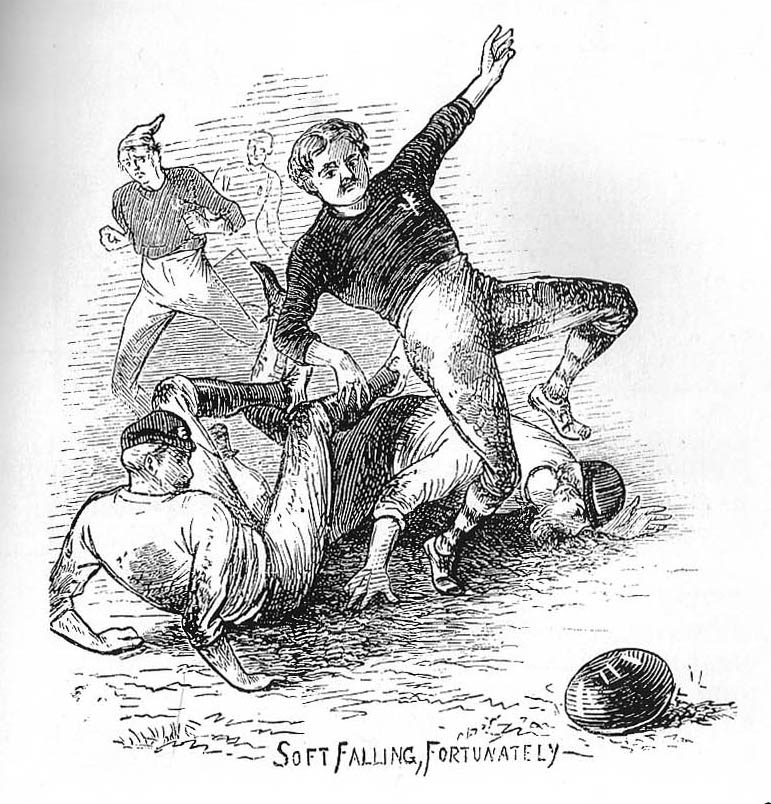
Illustrations of the first international at Hamilton Crescent, by William Ralston.

Scotland and England are the oldest national football teams in the world. Teams representing the two sides first competed at the Oval in five matches between 1870 and 1872. The two countries contested the first official international football match, at Hamilton Crescent in Partick, Scotland on 30 November 1872. The match ended in a goalless draw. All eleven players who represented Scotland that day played for Glasgow amateur club Queen's Park. Over the next forty years, Scotland played matches exclusively against the other three Home nations—England, Wales and Ireland. The British Home Championship began in 1883, making these games competitive. The encounters against England were particularly fierce and a rivalry quickly developed.

The first international against Wales came on 25 March 1876 when the Scots were comfortable 4–0 winners.

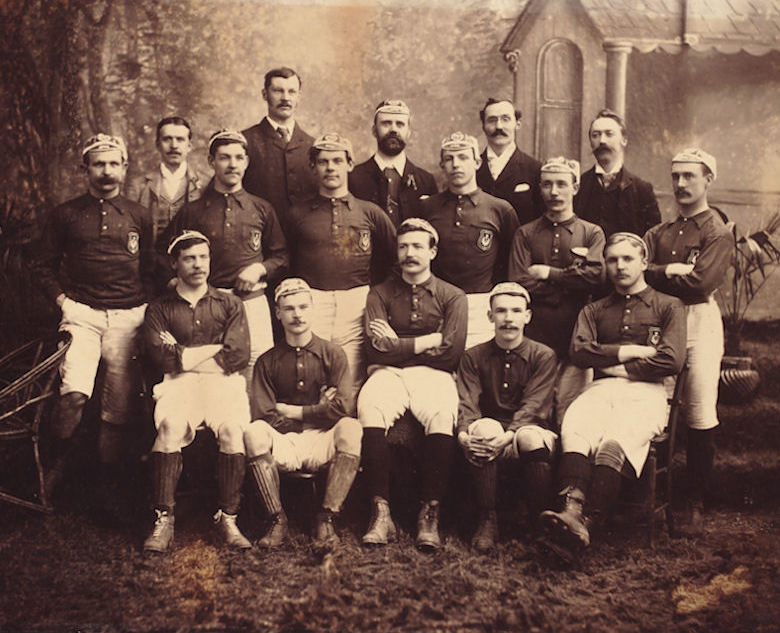
The Scotland team that played against England in 1892.

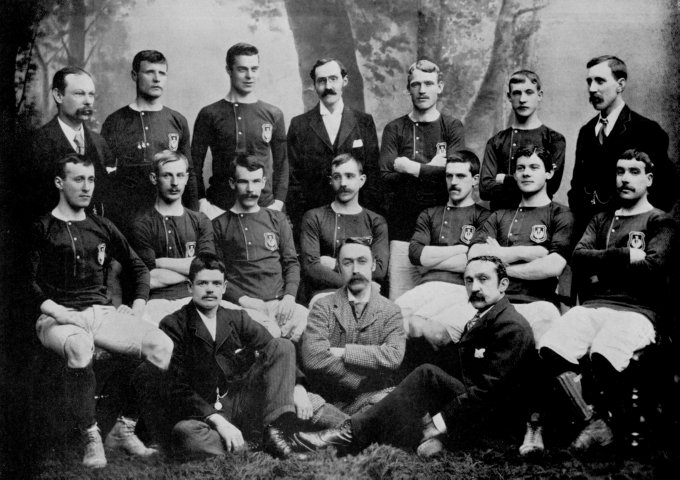
The Scotland national team in 1895.

Between 1872 and 1929, Scotland only played matches against the other Home Nations of England, Ireland and Wales. Initially the matches between the Home Nations were merely annual friendly fixtures, but the introduction of the British Home Championship in 1884 provided competitive international football for the first time. The lack of games against other opponents was largely due to the assumed dominance of the Home Nations in football and the logistical problems of arranging internationals in the days before air travel was commonplace.

During these early years, defeats for Scotland were something of a rarity, losing just two of their first 43 international matches. It wasn't until a 2–0 home defeat by Ireland in 1903 that Scotland lost a match to a team other than England. Scotland won 26 of the 51 British Home Championships held before the Second World War, sharing nine of those titles. The 7–2 defeat by the Scots in 1878 stood England's record loss until 1954. Another particularly notable Scotland win against England was a 5–1 win at Wembley against England in 1928, which led to that team being dubbed the Wembley Wizards. However, the Scottish eleven in that match never played together again, and soon a dispute with the English authorities over the release of players in 1930 led to the SFA only selecting home-based players for some time. There had been eight 'Anglos' involved in the 1928 victory, but it would be a decade later before so many were involved in the fixture again.

The SFA joined FIFA in 1910, but the relationship between FIFA and the Home Nations was fraught. All of them withdrew from FIFA in 1928 in a dispute over payments to amateur players. Scotland played their first match outside the British Isles in 1929, beating Norway 7–3 in Bergen. Scotland contested more friendly matches against continental opposition and enjoyed wins against Germany, the Netherlands and France before being beaten 5–0 by the Austrian Wunderteam and 3–0 by Italy.

Due to their withdrawal from FIFA, Scotland did not participate in the 1930 FIFA World Cup. Several Scottish-born players played for the United States, who reached the semi-finals. They lost 6–1 to Argentina, with Jim Brown scoring the American goal.

== 1950s ==
Scotland had to wait until 1954 before taking part in their first World Cup, even though they had qualified for the 1950 FIFA World Cup. Two places were allocated to the Home Nations with the 1950 British Home Championship acting as a qualifying group. However, the SFA stated that they would only send a team to the World Cup if they won the Home Championship. Going into their last game with England this was a possibility, but a 1–0 defeat meant that Scotland finished second behind England and the SFA declined to send the national side to the World Cup. Scottish-born Ed McIlvenny was part of the United States team that beat England 1–0 at the finals.

The SFA took a more relaxed stance for the next World Cup and Scotland qualified along with England from a combined World Cup qualifying group and British Home Championship in second place. Andy Beattie was appointed as the team's first ever manager, a position he held on a part-time basis as he was also managing Huddersfield Town. Beattie resigned during the World Cup after the SFA had decided to take only 13 players, despite FIFA allowing 22 to be selected. Scotland were beaten 1–0 and 7–0 by Austria and Uruguay respectively in the finals. As of October 2020 the defeat by Uruguay is the heaviest defeat that Scotland have ever suffered.

Scotland also qualified for the 1958 World Cup ahead of Spain, and in the same year achieved a friendly win away to World Cup holders West Germany. The team earned their first World Cup point with a 1–1 draw with Yugoslavia, but they lost their other two matches to Paraguay and France and therefore finished bottom of their group. Matt Busby was due to manage the team at the World Cup, but due to the severe injuries he suffered in the Munich air disaster, trainer Dawson Walker took charge of the team.

== 1960s ==
The British Home Championship was won in 1962 and 1963 under the management of Ian McColl. Jock Stein, John Prentice and Malky McDonald all then had brief spells as manager.

Bobby Brown was appointed Scotland manager in 1967. His first match as manager was something of a daunting one, against the 1966 World Cup winners England at Wembley. Despite including four Lisbon Lions and other greats including Denis Law, Jim Baxter and Billy Bremner, the team were considered underdogs against England, who were unbeaten in 19 internationals. Scotland emerged with a famous 3–2 victory, with the goals scored by Denis Law, Bobby Lennox and debutant Jim McCalliog. The victory led fans to call Scotland the "unofficial world champions". Towards the end of the match, Scotland winger Jim Baxter famously played keepie uppie at walking pace as he tormented the opposition. The Herald writer Glyn Edwards described the scene as follows:

I shall cherish for a long time the memory of Baxter slowing down the game to almost walking pace, insouciantly juggling the ball with instep, forehead and knees while Stiles, no more than a couple of yards away, bobbed up and down, unsure whether to make his challenge at knee or head level.

Despite the famous victory at Wembley, Scotland missed out on the chance to play a quarter-final match against Spain in the 1968 European Championship because they finished one point below England in their qualifying group. The group was the total of the results in the 1967 and 1968 British Home Championships. Bobby Brown's managership continued to be inconsistent, as the team failed to qualify for the 1970 World Cup.

== 1970s ==
Tommy Docherty was appointed as manager in 1971 and achieved some short-term success, including sharing a British Home Championship. He resigned from the Scotland job to become manager of Manchester United.

=== 1974 World Cup ===
Willie Ormond was appointed Scotland manager in 1973. Despite losing his first match in charge, a 5–0 thrashing by England in the SFA Centenary Match, the team qualified for the 1974 FIFA World Cup, their first in 16 years. Scotland qualified by winning 3 of their 4 games in a group including Czechoslovakia and Denmark. At the finals in West Germany, Scotland remained unbeaten but failed to progress beyond the group stages on goal difference after beating Zaire 2–0 and drawing 0–0 and 1–1 with Brazil and Yugoslavia respectively. Scotland also shared the 1974 British Home Championship with England but failed to qualify for the 1976 European Championship. Willie Ormond resigned in 1977 after several minor breaches of player discipline.

=== 1978 World Cup ===
Scotland appointed Ally MacLeod in May 1977 with qualification for the 1978 World Cup far from assured. Hopes were raised when, within a month of MacLeod's appointment, the team won the 1977 British Home Championship by beating England 2–1 at Wembley. After the game the Tartan Army infamously staged a pitch invasion during which the pitch was ripped up and the crossbar was broken. Scotland went on to assure qualification for the 1978 World Cup with victories over Czechoslovakia and a key victory over Wales at Anfield. They beat Wales largely thanks to a controversial penalty kick that was given for handball by a Welsh player, but the ball appeared to have been handled by Joe Jordan. Kenny Dalglish then sealed the victory with a memorable diving header.

During the buildup to the tournament, MacLeod fuelled the hopes and dreams of the nation by stating that even if Scotland didn't win the World Cup, they would most definitely come home with a medal of some kind. When asked what his plans were for after the World Cup, MacLeod quipped "Defend it!". As the squad left for the finals in Argentina, they were given a rapturous send off as they were paraded around a packed Hampden Park in an open-top bus. Thousands more fans lined the route to Prestwick Airport as the team set off for Argentina. Things began to go wrong soon after, however, as a row between players and the SFA regarding bonus payments began to emerge. Despite this, Scotland opened up their World Cup campaign against Peru and things appeared to be going well as a Joe Jordan goal put Scotland 1–0 up after just 14 minutes. They looked even better when they were awarded a penalty kick, but Don Masson spurned the chance to put them two up and Peru were level by half-time. After the break they took control of the match and a late second half double from Teófilo Cubillas condemned Scotland to a 3–1 defeat. Willie Johnston tested positive for a drug test after the game and was subsequently sent home in disgrace.

Scotland again took the lead in their second match against Iran but a 60th-minute equaliser from Iraj Danaeifard saw Scotland's World Cup hopes hanging by a thread. The disconsolate and shell-shocked mood of the nation was reflected by footage of Ally MacLeod in the dugout with his head in his hands. After taking just 1 point from their opening two games, Scotland had to defeat one of the tournament favourites, the Netherlands, by three clear goals to qualify. Despite the Dutch taking the lead, Scotland fought back to lead 3–1 with goals from Kenny Dalglish and a double from Archie Gemmill, the second of which is generally regarded as the best goal in Scotland's history as he beat three Dutch defenders before lifting the ball over goalkeeper Jan Jongbloed. The joy was short lived, however, as within three minutes the Dutch striker Johnny Rep had pulled a goal back and the match finished 3–2. Scotland bowed out of the tournament on goal difference for the second successive World Cup. After the finals MacLeod took charge of only one more match, a 3–2 defeat by Austria in the first match of the 1980 European Championship qualifiers, before resigning.

== 1980s ==
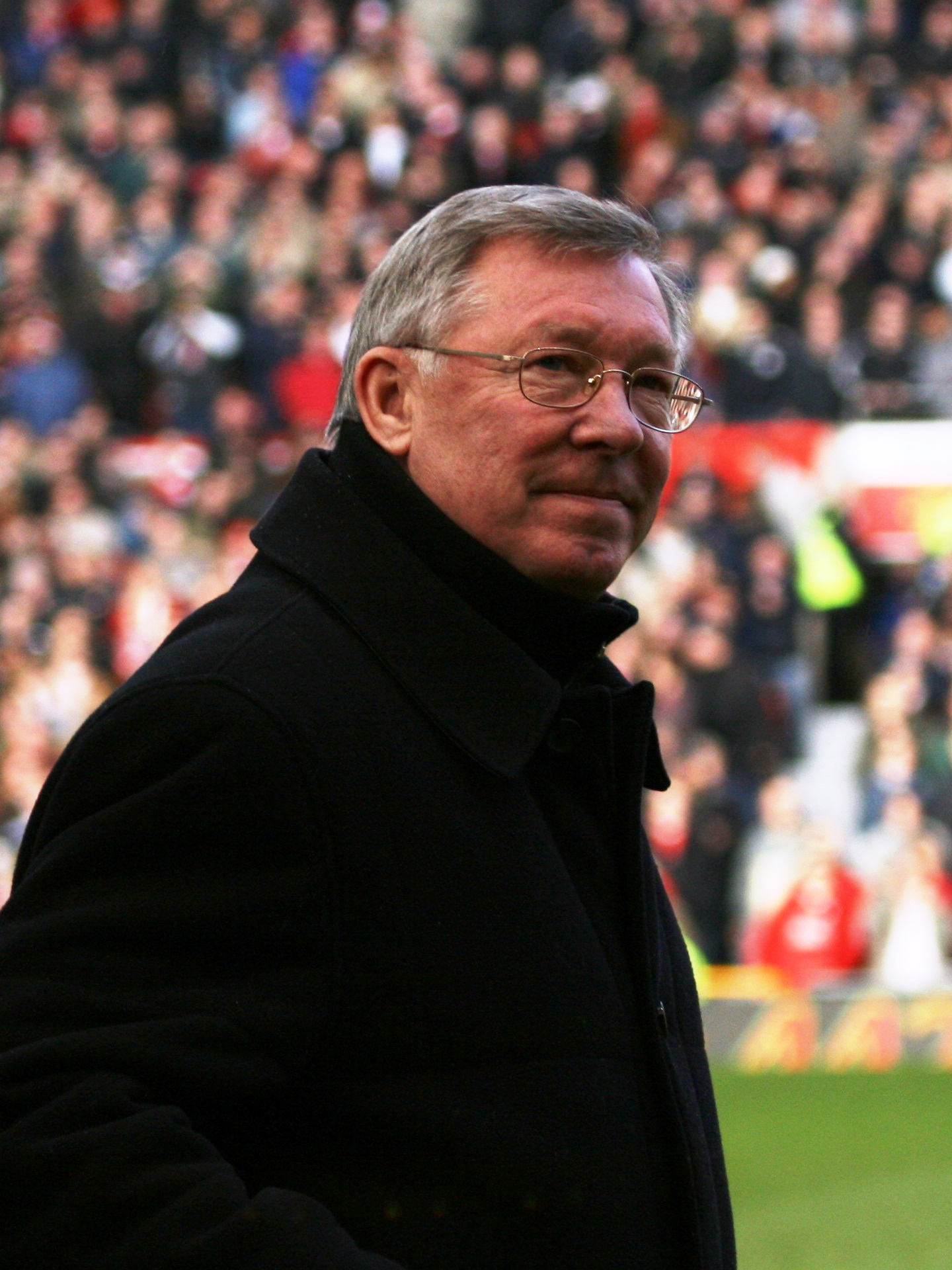
Alex Ferguson managed Scotland at the 1986 FIFA World Cup, having stepped in after the sudden death of Jock Stein.

Jock Stein was appointed as Scotland manager in 1978. After failing to qualify for Euro 1980, Scotland qualified for their third successive World Cup finals from a group consisting of Sweden, Portugal, Israel and Northern Ireland, losing just one match in the process. At the finals, Scotland were eliminated from the tournament on goal difference for a third successive World Cup. An opening 5–2 win over New Zealand was followed by a 4–1 defeat by Brazil, despite Scotland taking the lead through a goal from David Narey which pundit Jimmy Hill infamously described as a "toe poke". Scotland were eliminated by a 2–2 draw with the Soviet Union, with the key Soviet goal being caused by a mix-up between Willie Miller and Alan Hansen.

Scotland once again failed to qualify for the European Championships, as they won just one match in their qualifying group. Despite this, the team qualified for their fourth successive World Cup in dramatic circumstances. Scotland went into their last qualification match needing a point to earn a play-off match. With Wales leading 1–0, Scotland were awarded a penalty kick with just nine minutes remaining, which was scored by Davie Cooper. As the players and fans celebrated the final score of 1–1, rumours began to circulate that manager Jock Stein had suffered a heart attack, from which he soon died.

Stein's assistant Alex Ferguson took the role of manager on a part-time caretaker basis, as he was still managing his successful Aberdeen side. Scotland won the qualifying play-off against Australia 2–0 on aggregate, but they went out of the World Cup with just one point from their three matches, as the team lost to Denmark and West Germany. The final match against Uruguay ended in a goalless draw, despite the Uruguayans having a player sent off in the opening minutes. The SFA chief executive Ernie Walker memorably described the Uruguayans as "animals". Ferguson relinquished the Scotland job after the World Cup and moved on to Manchester United a few months later.

Following the 1986 FIFA World Cup, Andy Roxburgh took charge of Scotland for the 1988 European Championship qualifying section. Scotland performed poorly in the qualifying group, although an away victory against Bulgaria handed qualification to the Republic of Ireland. Following this failure, Scotland regrouped for the 1990 World Cup and qualified narrowly. They beat France 2–0 at Hampden Park in heavy rain, with Mo Johnston scoring twice. Scotland looked on course to qualify comfortably, but they then lost heavily in both France and Yugoslavia, leaving them needing to avoid defeat at home to Norway in the final game. Scotland were leading 1–0 when a bad error from goalkeeper Jim Leighton allowed the Norwegians to equalise. Had the Norwegians scored again, Scotland would have been out, but the 65,000 crowd breathed a sigh of relief when the final whistle went.

== 1990s ==
=== 1990 World Cup ===
The team went into the 1990 World Cup finals with some confidence thanks to beating World Cup holders Argentina 1–0 in a friendly match, with Stewart McKimmie scoring the only goal. In their opening World Cup match, however, the team shockingly lost 1–0 to World Cup debutants Costa Rica. They recovered to win the following match against Sweden 2–1, with Stuart McCall and Mo Johnston scoring. This left Scotland realistically needing a point from their final game against Brazil to qualify. Scotland held the score at 0–0 for eighty minutes, but then conceded a goal by Careca after Leighton had fumbled a long-range shot. The team could still have qualified for the last 16 with favourable results in other matches, but the other results went against Scotland, who were again eliminated at the group stage.

=== Euro 92 ===
The UEFA Euro 1992 qualifying campaign was unspectacular, but effective, allowing Scotland to make their first appearance in a European Championship Finals. A 1–0 defeat away to Romania looked to have ended their chances, but a 1–1 draw between Bulgaria and Romania in the final group match allowed Scotland to squeeze through. The team were knocked out of the first round of the finals due to losses against Holland and Germany, but the final match produced a consolation 3–0 win over the former Soviet Union. The Scotland fans won an award from UEFA for their superb behaviour in the tournament, which changed the stereotype that had been set by the Wembley pitch invasion of 1977.

=== 1994 World Cup qualifying ===
Scotland faced a tough group in the bid to qualify for the 1994 FIFA World Cup, as they were drawn with Italy, Portugal and Switzerland. Scotland lost their opening match in Switzerland 3–1, with Richard Gough sent off for a deliberate handball. Scotland were playing away from their normal home stadium of Hampden Park because of redevelopment work for an all-seater stadium and were able to grind out goalless draws against both Italy and Portugal at Ibrox towards the end of 1992. After a 3–0 win against Malta at Ibrox the moment of truth came when the team were destroyed 5–0 by Portugal in Lisbon in April 1993. Ally McCoist broke his leg during the match, after which Roxburgh said "a team died out there".

The match itself is considered one of the worst results in the history of the national team. In 2015, Scotland manager Gordon Strachan referenced the match when talking about creating change in Scottish football: "Funnily enough, I felt that when Scotland got beat 5-0 by Portugal and Ally McCoist broke his leg. There was an outcry about the standard. I said it at that time, but only after another 20 years have passed do I feel that I can affect things, and performance director Brian McClair can affect things and the SFA can affect things".

Captain Richard Gough played his last match for the team, after he fell out with Roxburgh. When Craig Brown was appointed as manager, Gough said he wanted to play for Scotland again, but Brown refused to bring him back and ended his international career. Andy Roxburgh's final match in charge was a 1–1 draw against Switzerland at Pittodrie in September 1993 that mathematically ended the chance of qualification for the World Cup. It was a significant moment in Scottish football history because it meant that Scotland would not be at the World Cup for the first time since 1970.

=== Craig Brown ===
After Andy Roxburgh resigned as manager, Craig Brown took control, initially as caretaker. His first match was a 3–1 defeat against Italy at the Stadio Olimpico in a dead World Cup qualifying rubber. Scotland were well motivated to qualify for Euro 96 because of the failure to qualify for the World Cup and Euro 96 was to be held in England. The team only lost once in the qualifying section. The key match was a 1–0 home victory over Greece in August 1995. Ally McCoist scored the only goal of the game, moments after coming on as a substitute, in what was his first match for his country since he had broken his leg in the thrashing by Portugal two years earlier.

Scotland's first match of the tournament was a goalless draw against Holland at Villa Park. The next match was against England at Wembley, which was the first time that the sides had met since the annual fixture had stopped in 1989. An Alan Shearer header early in the second half gave England the lead, but Scotland were awarded a penalty kick with less than 20 minutes left. David Seaman saved Gary McAllister's penalty, and Paul Gascoigne scored a wonder goal minutes later to end the game as a contest. Having looked like they were all but out of the tournament, Scotland were given hope of qualifying for the quarter-finals. While they were in the process of beating Switzerland 1–0 at Villa Park, England were beating Holland 4–0 at Wembley, which gave a combination of scores that would have put Scotland through on goal difference. Patrick Kluivert then scored a goal for Holland that, in other circumstances have been no more than a late consolation, but it knocked Scotland out on goals scored.

Scotland moved onto the 1998 FIFA World Cup qualifying section, where they earned a good position by beating qualification rivals Sweden and Austria at home. During the section Scotland were part of an infamous incident, the "game that never was" against Estonia. Estonia had refused to turn up for the kick-off on time, which had been rearranged due to the poor quality of the floodlights at the Kadrioru Stadium in Tallinn. John Collins kicked off the match for Scotland against nobody, which led the Tartan Army present to sing:

There's only one team in Tallinn.

The referee blew his whistle to signal the end of the "match" after a few seconds. Scotland expected to be awarded a walkover win, but the Swedish President of UEFA Lennart Johansson controversially ordered the match to be replayed in Monaco, where Scotland could only draw 0–0. Despite this debacle, the team eventually sealed qualification in October 1997 with a 2–0 home victory against Latvia thanks to goals from Kevin Gallacher and Gordon Durie.

Scotland were drawn against defending champions Brazil in the opening game of the World Cup. John Collins converted a penalty kick to level the score at 1–1 after Cesar Sampaio had scored an early goal, but a Tom Boyd own goal led to a 2–1 defeat. Scotland then drew 1–1 against Norway in Bordeaux with Craig Burley scoring for Scotland. This left Scotland with a chance of qualifying going into the final match against Morocco, but they lost 3–0 and were again eliminated at the opening stage.

Scotland earned a favourable draw in qualifying for Euro 2000, having qualified for the previous two tournaments, but it proved to be a struggle. Their first match ended in a goalless draw away against Lithuania. Against Estonia at Tynecastle they twice went behind but eventually won 3–2 thanks to two late strikes from substitute Billy Dodds. Goalkeeper Jim Leighton retired from international football game after being blamed for the Estonian goals. Gary McAllister was booed by a section of the crowd during a 2–1 defeat by the Czech Republic at Celtic Park, which led to his decision to retire from international football. An embarrassing draw in the Faroe Islands followed. Four days later, Scotland went 2–0 up through goals Paul Ritchie and Allan Johnston against the Czech Republic in Prague, but the team eventually collapsed to a 3–2 defeat.

Largely due to the poor quality of the group outside the Czechs, who won all of their games, Scotland finished second in the group and progressed to a qualifying play–off against England. In the first leg of the play–off England won 2–0 at Hampden with Paul Scholes scoring both goals. Despite losing the home game and appearing to be out of contention, Scotland went to Wembley and won 1–0 with Don Hutchison scoring. It was a superb Wembley victory for Scotland, but it was a Pyrrhic victory as Scotland failed to qualify.

== 2000s ==
After being unlucky in qualifying for Euro 2000, Scotland were nowhere near the play-off stage as they failed to qualify for the 2002 FIFA World Cup. The team's failure to win against either Croatia or Belgium, their main rivals for qualification home or away was a key factor. This was despite taking a 2–0 lead at Hampden Park against Belgium, who had a player sent off in the incident that led to the second goal. Scotland then conceded two goals, including one in the last minute, allowing Belgium to escape with a 2–2 draw. When Scotland were well beaten 2–0 in the away match in Brussels, it sparked the end of several international careers with Paul Lambert, Billy Dodds and Tom Boyd all announcing their retirements after the defeat. Lambert would be persuaded back by incoming manager Berti Vogts but not before Craig Brown officially resigned from his job after 8 years in charge. His final match in charge was against Latvia in which Scotland won 2–1 at Hampden Park. Towards the end of his tenure, Brown was criticised by the media for persisting with an ageing core of players.

=== Berti Vogts ===
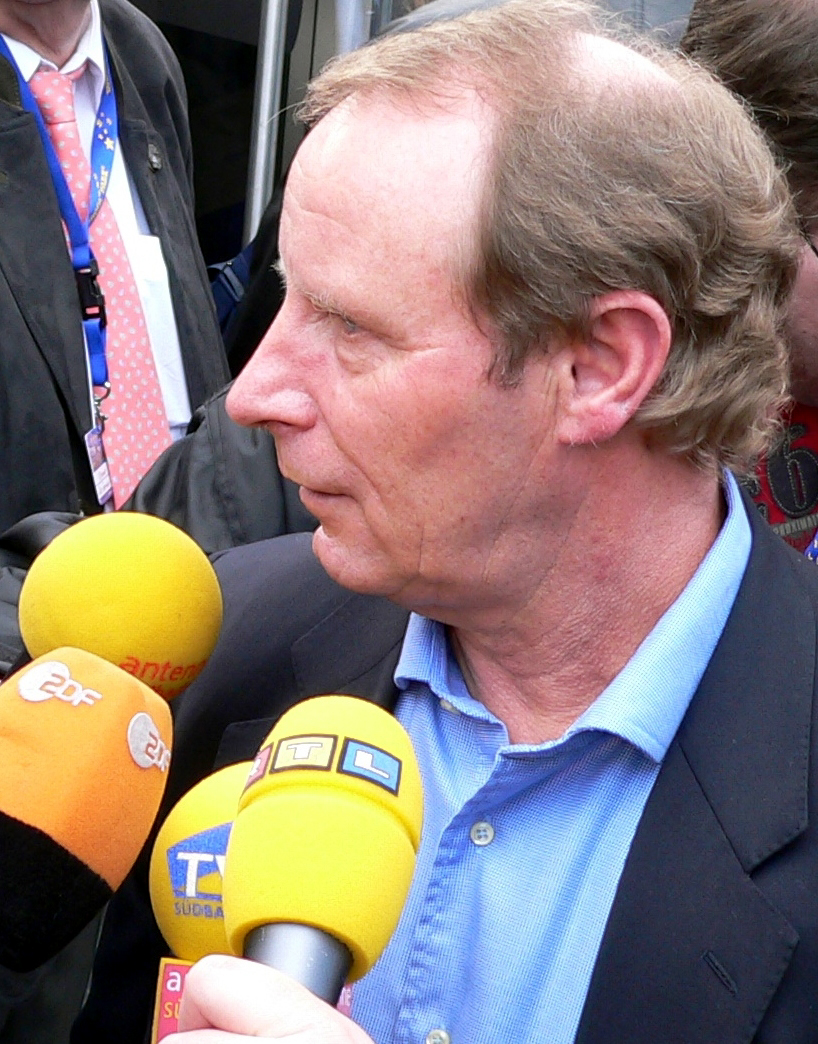
Berti Vogts, the first foreigner to manage Scotland.

The SFA hired the first ever foreign manager of the national team when they appointed former Germany manager Berti Vogts in February 2002. Vogts signalled his intentions to blood young players after previous manager Craig Brown had stuck with the same group of players that he had inherited. In Vogts' first match in charge against France at the Stade de France, Scotland were hammered 5–0 against the World and European champions. A number of friendly matches followed arranged in the first half of 2002, including a tour of the Far East. Scotland lost all of these matches, including a 4–1 defeat against South Korea. The team did manage to win 4–0 against a Hong Kong League XI.

Vogts' team started the qualifying section for UEFA Euro 2004 in the Faroe Islands. Scotland went 2–0 down in just under 12 minutes, with both goals scored by a schoolteacher called John Petersen. Sportscene presenter Dougie Donnelly described the game at half-time as "perhaps the worst Scotland performance he had the displeasure of watching". Goals by Paul Lambert and Barry Ferguson salvaged a 2–2 draw for Scotland, but the damage had been done and Scotland were ridiculed by fans and media alike. David Weir retired from international football after being criticised by Vogts for his poor performance. Vogts also criticised Christian Dailly, but he decided to play on.

The Faroes disaster was still lingering in the minds of fans but Scotland would go on to finish second in their group to Germany to secure a play-off position for qualification for UEFA Euro 2004. They defeated the Faroes in the return match, defeated Iceland home and away and drew with Germany at home. The team beat Lithuania 1–0 in the final match of the group with a goal by Darren Fletcher to qualify for a play–off against Holland. Scotland beat the Dutch 1–0 at Hampden Park, thanks to a deflected goal by James McFadden, which raised hopes of qualification. These were crushed days later in the return match when a 6–0 thrashing, one of Scotland's heaviest ever defeats at the Amsterdam Arena gave the Dutch a 6–1 win on aggregate. Ruud van Nistelrooy scored a hat-trick as Scotland were swept aside.

Vogts received further criticism after Scotland were beaten 4–0 by Wales in a friendly match at the Millennium Stadium. Scotland lost two further friendlies against Romania and Denmark, but they did pick up wins over Estonia and Trinidad and Tobago at the end of the season. In preparation for the 2006 FIFA World Cup qualifying campaign Scotland lost 3–0 to Hungary in a friendly match at Hampden Park, before a creditable performance against Spain saw a match that was being drawn 1–1 when it was abandoned due to the floodlights failing.

Scotland's opening qualifier against Slovenia finished in a goalless draw. Scotland then lost 1–0 to Norway at Hampden, their first home competitive defeat in 17 years. Days later Scotland drew 1–1 away to Moldova, where Vogts and some of his players were subject to verbal abuse by the Tartan Army. In October 2004 Vogts announced his resignation, blaming the media for his departure. Vogts did introduce a number of young players to the Scotland team, including Craig Gordon, Darren Fletcher and James McFadden. He was, however, heavily criticised by the media for his "scattergun" approach to selection, naive tactics and taking Scotland to an all-time low in the FIFA rankings. Vogts' assistant Tommy Burns took charge of a 4–1 friendly defeat against Sweden at Easter Road.

The Berti Vogts era in Scottish Football is looked back by many people as the worst period in Scotland's history but was not helped by a considerable lack of international-quality players available to him during his reign. Vogts handed out an astonishing 40 debutants, trying to rebuild the side.

=== Walter Smith ===
David Taylor appointed Walter Smith and Ally McCoist as the new management team in December 2004. Smith convinced David Weir, who had played for Smith at Everton, to come out of international retirement. Smith's first game in charge was against Italy at the San Siro in March 2005, which Scotland lost 2–0 through two free kicks by Andrea Pirlo. In June 2005, Scotland beat Moldova 2–0 and drew 0–0 in Belarus.

In the following season, Scotland achieved creditable results with a 1–1 draw at home to Italy and a 2–1 win in Norway. A surprise 1–0 defeat against Belarus ended their chances of qualifying, but the team ended the campaign on a high by winning 3–0 in Slovenia. Scotland played two low-key friendlies before a squad that was well below full strength went to Japan in May 2006 to take part in the Kirin Cup. Scotland beat Bulgaria 5–1 with debutants Chris Burke and Kris Boyd scoring two goals each. Scotland then kept out the hosts Japan to secure a goalless draw that won the trophy.

The results under Smith had given the country hope, but Scotland were given "one of the hardest groups" for UEFA Euro 2008 qualifying as they were entered into Group B with France, Italy and Ukraine. The extraordinary difficulty of the group was confirmed when Ukraine reached the quarter-final of the 2006 World Cup, while France and Italy contested the final itself (which Italy won on penalties). Scotland at least got off to a good start in the group by winning 6–0 at Celtic Park against the Faroe Islands. and 2–1 in Lithuania. Scotland then recorded a famous 1–0 victory against France at Hampden on 7 October 2006, with Gary Caldwell scoring the only goal in the 67th minute.

The next match in Kyiv against Ukraine ended in a 2–0 defeat, with Steven Pressley sent off. The defeat by Ukraine proved to be Walter Smith's final match in charge, as he returned to former club Rangers. This left Scotland managerless with just over two months until the next matches against Georgia and Italy. Former Rangers manager Alex McLeish was hotly tipped and supported by Alex Ferguson to become the new manager, although long-term Scotland assistant manager Tommy Burns was also thought to be in the running. McLeish was appointed while Burns was not interviewed, which caused Burns to resign from his position.

=== Alex McLeish ===
Alex McLeish was appointed Scotland manager on 29 January 2007, and he hired Roy Aitken and Andy Watson as his assistants. McLeish's first match in charge was a UEFA Euro 2008 qualifier against Georgia in March 2007. In the 11th minute Kris Boyd scored to put Scotland in front. Georgia equalised just before half time with a goal from former Rangers striker Shota Arveladze, but a late winner by Craig Beattie gave Scotland a 2–1 win, and meant they 'held' the unofficial world champion title for the first time since 1967. Four days later Scotland went down 2–0 to the 2006 FIFA World Cup winners Italy in Bari. Scotland continued their progress with wins over the Faroe Islands and Lithuania.

Scotland then produced a stunning 1–0 victory over France in Paris, thanks to a long-range strike by James McFadden. They consolidated their position at the top of the qualifying group with a convincing 3–1 win against Ukraine, but a 2–0 defeat in Georgia severely damaged the position. Instead of potentially just needing a draw from the final game at home to Italy to qualify, Scotland needed to win as a draw would leave them depending on other results.

Italy took an early lead and had chances to knock Scotland out early, but the team battled back with an equalising goal by Barry Ferguson. Scotland then created chances to win the game, with James McFadden missing the best of them with just 10 minutes remaining. As Scotland pressed in search of a winning goal, the Italians were controversially awarded a free kick in injury time that led to a winning goal for Italy. After narrowly failing to qualify for Euro 2008, McLeish resigned to take the manager's job at Birmingham City.

=== George Burley ===
Scotland's improved results in the last two campaigns meant the team were seeded second for 2010 FIFA World Cup qualifying, and they were drawn with the Netherlands, Norway, Macedonia and Iceland. Southampton manager George Burley was hired as the new manager, but the team failed to win three preparatory friendlies against Croatia, Czech Republic and Northern Ireland. Burley came in for criticism from the media after the team lost their first qualifier against Macedonia, but they recovered to win 2–1 in Iceland. The next match was a goalless draw at home against Norway, during which debutant Chris Iwelumo missed an open goal from three yards.

Scotland lost their fourth match 3–0 away to the Netherlands. captain Barry Ferguson and goalkeeper Allan McGregor, who had both played in that match, were dropped for the following match against Iceland due to a "breach of discipline". George Burley made five changes in all for the match, which ended in a 2–1 win for Scotland, with Ross McCormack and Steven Fletcher both scoring on their competitive home debuts. A terrible 4–0 defeat by Norway in the following qualifier, however, left Scotland effectively needing to win their last two games to have a realistic chance of making the qualifying play-offs. Scotland defeated Macedonia 2–0 in the first of those two games at Hampden, but were eliminated by a 1–0 loss to the Netherlands in the second game.

Nonetheless, Burley was allowed to continue in his post after a review by the SFA board. Soon afterwards, joint assistant coach Steven Pressley stood down from his role to concentrate on his commitments with Falkirk. Speaking after the campaign, Kenny Miller criticised the fixture schedule that had been agreed for the group, describing it as a "shambles". Burley came under further pressure after a 3–0 friendly defeat by Wales, as he conceded that it was a "very poor" performance, while the Tartan Army "showed their disgruntlement with Burley and the SFA" during the match. The SFA sacked Burley on 16 November 2009.

== 2010s ==
=== Craig Levein ===
The SFA appointed Craig Levein as Scotland manager in December 2009. In UEFA Euro 2012 qualification, Scotland were grouped with Lithuania, Liechtenstein, Czech Republic and world champions Spain. They took just four points from the first four games, leaving the team needing three wins from their remaining four games to have a realistic chance of progression. They only managed two wins and a draw and were eliminated after a 3–1 defeat by Spain in their last match. Levein left his position as head coach following a poor start to 2014 FIFA World Cup qualification, having taken just two points from four games.

=== Gordon Strachan ===
Gordon Strachan was appointed Scotland manager in January 2013, but defeats in his first two competitive matches meant that Scotland were the first UEFA team to be eliminated. In their next competitive game, however, Scotland produced a surprise away victory against a Croatia (ranked fourth by FIFA at the time). They also won the return match against Croatia and finished fourth in qualifying group A.

In UEFA Euro 2016 qualifying, Scotland appeared to have a better chance of qualification as the finals tournament was expanded from 16 teams to 24, but were drawn in a tough group with Germany, Poland and Republic of Ireland. After losing their opening match in Germany, Scotland recorded home wins against Georgia, Ireland and Gibraltar, and away draws against Poland and Ireland. In their following game Scotland produced an "insipid" performance, as they lost 1–0 in Georgia. A home defeat by Germany left Scotland four points behind third-placed Ireland, with two games left to play. In the penultimate matches of the group, Scotland needed to beat Poland, or hope that Ireland would lose to Germany. Scotland came from behind to lead 2–1 in their game, but Ireland had scored the only goal of their game, leaving the Scots needing a win to stay alive. A late scrambled goal by Robert Lewandowski gave Poland a draw that eliminated Scotland from contention. Strachan bemoaned what he perceived to be bad luck. After a win against Gibraltar in the last qualifier, Strachan agreed a new contract with the Scottish Football Association.

In qualification for the 2018 FIFA World Cup, Scotland were drawn in the same group as England, facing their rivals in a competitive fixture for the first time since 1999. On 11 November 2016, England beat Scotland 3–0 at Wembley. The return match saw Leigh Griffiths score two late free-kicks to give Scotland a 2–1 lead, but Harry Kane scored in added time to force a 2–2 draw. A draw in Slovenia in the final game of the group ended Scottish hopes of a play-off position, and Strachan subsequently left his position by mutual consent.

=== Alex McLeish ===
In February 2018, Alex McLeish was appointed manager for the second time. The team won their group in the 2018–19 UEFA Nations League, guaranteeing a play-off position for UEFA Euro 2020, but McLeish left in April 2019. This followed a 3–0 loss to 117th-ranked Kazakhstan in the first match of the UEFA Euro 2020 qualifying group.

== 2020s ==
=== Steve Clarke ===
Steve Clarke was appointed Scotland manager in May 2019. The team failed to qualify automatically for UEFA Euro 2020, finishing a distant third behind Belgium and Russia. The team then entered the playoffs, where consecutive victories in penalty shootouts against Israel and Serbia put Scotland into their first major tournament since 1998. Defeats by the Czech Republic and Croatia, either side of a goalless draw with England, meant that Scotland finished bottom of Group D. Six consecutive wins later that year meant that Scotland finished second in Group F of 2022 FIFA World Cup qualification. This progressed the team into the play-offs, where they lost 3–1 to Ukraine in a semi-final at Hampden.

Scotland won promotion to League A in their final match of the 2022–23 competition, a goalless draw against Ukraine in Kraków.

A record-breaking run of five consecutive wins at the start of Euro 2024 qualifying meant that Scotland secured a place at Euro 2024 with two matches to spare. That winning run included a 2–0 win at home to Spain. The team failed to progress through the group stage of Euro 2024, losing heavily to Germany in the opening match of the tournament and finishing with one point after a draw with Switzerland and a last minute loss to Hungary.

They were immediately relegated back to League B in the 2024–25 competition, after losing a playoff against Greece.

In their 2026 World Cup qualification group Scotland drew with Denmark away, beat Belarus twice and Greece at home. A defeat in Greece endangered their chances of winning automatic qualification, but Denmark being held to a draw by Belarus kept their hopes alive. Scotland then beat Denmark 4–2 at home in the last match of the section to qualify for their ninth World Cup finals, and their first since 1998.

== See also ==
- List of Celtic F.C. international footballers
- List of Queen's Park F.C. international players
- List of Rangers F.C. international footballers
- Scotland at the FIFA World Cup
- Scotland at the UEFA European Championship
