= List of football stadiums in Scotland =

This is a list of association football stadiums in Scotland, ranked in order of capacity, with the minimum capacity being 1,000. The largest association football ground is Celtic Park with a capacity of 60,411. The three largest football stadiums in the country are located in Scotland's largest city Glasgow – Celtic Park, Hampden Park (the football ground of the national football team) and Ibrox Stadium.

The Scottish Premiership has the highest number of largest stadiums in the country by capacity. Other smaller stadiums include Somerset Park in Ayr and Firhill Stadium in Glasgow, both of which are Scottish Championship league stadiums.

== Current stadiums ==
#	Image	Stadium (Note: Being a list of stadiums in Scotland it does not include Berwick Rangers F.C. The team play at Shielfield Park (capacity 4,099) in the Lowland League and are located south of the Scottish border, in Northumberland, England.)	Capacity	City	Home team	League (Note: SPFL: Scottish Professional Football League; HFL: Highland Football League; LFL: Lowland Football League; EoSFL: East of Scotland Football League; SoSFL: South of Scotland Football League; WoSFL: West of Scotland Football League; SJFA: Scottish Junior Football Association (East, North); NCFL: North Caledonian Football League; SWPL: Scottish Women's Premier League)	Opened	Surface	Ref.
1		Murrayfield Stadium	67,144	Edinburgh	Scotland national rugby union team	None	1925	Hybrid	
2		Celtic Park	60,411	Glasgow	Celtic F.C.	SPFL	1892	Hybrid	
3		Hampden Park	51,866	Glasgow	Scotland national football team	None	1903	Hybrid	
4		Ibrox Stadium	51,700	Glasgow	Rangers F.C.	SPFL	1899	Hybrid	
5		Pittodrie Stadium	20,866	Aberdeen	Aberdeen F.C.	SPFL	1899	Grass	
6		Easter Road	20,421	Edinburgh	Hibernian F.C.	SPFL	1893	Hybrid	
7		Tynecastle Park	19,852	Edinburgh	Heart of Midlothian F.C.	SPFL	1886	Hybrid	
8		Rugby Park	15,003	Kilmarnock	Kilmarnock F.C.	SPFL	1899	Grass	
9		Tannadice Park	14,223	Dundee	Dundee United F.C.	SPFL	1883	Grass	
10		Fir Park	13,677	Motherwell	Motherwell F.C.	SPFL	1895	Hybrid	
11		Dens Park	11,775	Dundee	Dundee F.C.	SPFL	1899	Grass	
12		Cappielow Park	11,589	Greenock	Greenock Morton F.C.	SPFL	1879	Grass	
13		East End Park	11,480	Dunfermline	Dunfermline Athletic F.C.	SPFL	1885	Grass	
14		McDiarmid Park	10,696	Perth	St Johnstone F.C.	SPFL	1989	Artificial	
15		Somerset Park	10,185	Ayr	Ayr United F.C.	SPFL	1888	Grass	
16		Firhill Stadium	10,102	Glasgow	Partick Thistle F.C.	SPFL	1909	Grass	
17		Excelsior Stadium	10,101	Airdrie	Airdrieonians F.C. Glasgow University F.C.	SPFL WoSFL	1998	Artificial	
18		Stark's Park	8,867	Kirkcaldy	Raith Rovers F.C.	SPFL	1891	Artificial	
19		Almondvale Stadium	8,716	Livingston	Livingston F.C.	SPFL	1995	Artificial	
20		Palmerston Park	8,690	Dumfries	Queen of the South F.C. Heston Rovers F.C.	SPFL SoSFL	1919	Artificial	
21		Broadwood Stadium	8,086	Cumbernauld	Cumbernauld Colts	LFL	1994	Artificial	
22		St Mirren Park	7,937	Paisley	St Mirren F.C.	SPFL	2009	Grass	
23		Falkirk Stadium	7,937	Falkirk	Falkirk F.C. East Stirlingshire F.C.	SPFL; LFL	2004	Artificial	
24		Caledonian Stadium	7,512	Inverness	Inverness Caledonian Thistle F.C.	SPFL	1996	Grass	
25		Station Park	6,777	Forfar	Forfar Athletic F.C. Forfar Farmington F.C.	SPFL SWPL	1888	Artificial	
26		Gayfield Park	6,600	Arbroath	Arbroath F.C.	SPFL	1925	Grass	
27		Victoria Park	6,541	Dingwall	Ross County F.C.	SPFL	1929	Grass	
28		New Douglas Park	6,018	Hamilton	Hamilton Academical; Clyde F.C.	SPFL	2001	Artificial	
29		Victoria Park	5,000	Buckie	Buckie Thistle F.C.	HFL	1919	Grass	
30		Beechwood Park	5,000	Sauchie	Sauchie Juniors F.C.	EoSFL		Grass	
31		Links Park	4,936	Montrose	Montrose F.C. Montrose Roselea	SPFL SJFA North	1887	Artificial	
32		Borough Briggs	4,520	Elgin	Elgin City F.C.	SPFL	1921	Grass	
33		Central Park	4,309	Cowdenbeath	Cowdenbeath F.C.	LFL	1917	Grass	
34		Stair Park	4,178	Stranraer	Stranraer F.C.	SPFL	1907	Grass	
35		Glebe Park	4,083	Brechin	Brechin City F.C.	LFL	1919	Grass	
36		Claggan Park	4,000	Fort William	Fort William F.C.	NCFL		Grass	
37		Dudgeon Park	4,000	Brora	Brora Rangers F.C.	HFL		Grass	
38		Kynoch Park	4,000	Keith	Keith F.C.	HFL	1922	Grass	
39		Newlandsfield Park	4,000	Glasgow	Pollok F.C.	WoSFL	1928	Grass	
40		Hannah Park	4,000	Shotts	Shotts Bon Accord F.C.	WoSFL		Grass	
41		Forthbank Stadium	3,808	Stirling	Stirling Albion F.C. and University of Stirling F.C.	SPFL LFL	1993	Grass	
42		Ochilview Park	3,746	Stenhousemuir	Stenhousemuir F.C.	SPFL	1890	Artificial	
43		Ainslie Park	3,534	Edinburgh	The Spartans F.C. Spartans W.F.C.	LFL SWPL	2009	Artificial	
44		Holm Park	3,500	Clydebank	Clydebank F.C. Yoker Athletic F.C.	LFL; WoSFL		Artificial	
45		Balmoor Stadium	3,150	Peterhead	Peterhead F.C.	SPFL	1997	Grass	
46		Recreation Park	3,100	Alloa	Alloa Athletic F.C.	SPFL	1895	Artificial	
47		Bellslea Park	3,000	Fraserburgh	Fraserburgh F.C.	HFL	1909	Grass	
48		Creamery Park	3,000	Bathgate	Bathgate Thistle F.C.	SJFA East		Grass	
49		Valefield Park	3,000	Kilbirnie	Kilbirnie Ladeside F.C.	WoSFL		Grass	
50		Mackessack Park	2,700	Rothes	Rothes F.C.	HFL	1938	Grass	
51		Mosset Park	2,700	Forres	Forres Mechanics F.C.	HFL		Grass	
52		New Central Park	2,660	Kelty	Kelty Hearts F.C.	SPFL		Artificial	
53		Balmoral Stadium	2,602	Aberdeen	Cove Rangers F.C.	SPFL	2018	Artificial	
54		Princess Royal Park	2,600	Banff	Deveronvale F.C.	HFL		Grass	
55		Beechwood Park	2,600	Auchinleck	Auchinleck Talbot F.C.	LFL	1909	Grass	
56		New Pebble Park	2,600	Annbank	Annbank United F.C.	WoSFL	1949	Grass	
57		Galabank	2,504	Annan	Annan Athletic F.C.	SPFL		Artificial	
58		Harlaw Park	2,500	Inverurie	Inverurie Loco Works F.C.	HFL	1903	Grass	
59		Newtown Park	2,500	Bo'ness	Bo'ness United F.C.	LFL	1886	Artificial	
60		North Lodge Park	2,500	Pitmedden	Formartine United F.C.	HFL		Grass	
61		Guy's Meadow	2,500	Cumbernauld Village	Cumbernauld United F.C. Kirkintilloch Rob Roy F.C.	WoSFL	1964	Grass	
62		Ferguson Park	2,454	Rosewell	Whitehill Welfare F.C. Heart of Midlothian Reserves and Academy	EoSFL LFL		Grass	
63		Harmsworth Park	2,412	Wick	Wick Academy F.C.	HFL		Grass	
64		Forresters Park	2,300	Tranent	Tranent Juniors F.C.	LFL		Grass	
65		Prestonfield	2,264	Linlithgow	Linlithgow Rose F.C.	LFL	1949	Grass	
66		Station Park	2,250	Nairn	Nairn County F.C.	HFL		Grass	
67		Christie Park	2,200	Huntly	Huntly F.C.	HFL	1921	Grass	
68		New Dundas Park	2,200	Bonnyrigg	Bonnyrigg Rose Athletic F.C.	LFL		Grass	
69		Raydale Park	2,200	Gretna	Gretna F.C. 2008	LFL	1946	Artificial	
70		The Haughs	2,135	Turriff	Turriff United F.C.	HFL	1954	Grass	
71		Meadow Park	2,132	Irvine	Irvine Meadow XI F.C.	WoSFL		Grass	
72		Grant Street Park	2,074	Inverness	Clachnacuddin F.C.	HFL	1886	Grass	
73		Grant Park	2,050	Lossiemouth	Lossiemouth F.C.	HFL		Grass	
74		Dumbarton Football Stadium	2,020	Dumbarton	Dumbarton F.C.	SPFL	2000	Grass	
75		Netherdale	2,000	Galashiels	Gala Fairydean Rovers F.C.	LFL		Artificial	
76		Spain Park	2,000	Aberdeen	Banks O' Dee F.C.	HFL	1965	Artificial	
77		Bayview Stadium	1,980	Methil	East Fife F.C.	SPFL	1998	Artificial	
78		Lochburn Park	1,800	Glasgow	Maryhill F.C.	WoSFL		Grass	
79		Lesser Hampden	1,774	Glasgow	Queens Park F.C.	SPFL	1925	Grass	(Note: Queens Park are to move to Lesser Hampden for the 2025/26 season)
80		Seafield Park	1,600	Grantown-on-Spey	Strathspey Thistle F.C.	HFL		Grass	
81		Christie Gillies Park	1,569	Edinburgh	Civil Service Strollers F.C.	LFL		Grass	
82		Meadow Park	1,500	Castle Douglas	Threave Rovers F.C.	WoSFL		Grass	
83		Pennypit Park	1,500	Prestonpans	Preston Athletic F.C.	EoSFL		Grass	
84		Victoria Park	1,500	Innerleithen	Vale of Leithen F.C.	EoSFL		Grass	
86		Islecroft Stadium	1,320	Dalbeattie	Dalbeattie Star F.C.	SoSFL	1905	Grass	
86		Cliftonhill Stadium	1,238	Coatbridge	Albion Rovers F.C.	LFL	1919	Grass	
87		East Peffermill Stadium	1,100	Edinburgh	Edinburgh University F.C.	LFL		Grass	
88		Albert Park	1,000	Hawick	Hawick Royal Albert F.C.	EoSFL		Grass	
89		Beltane Park	1,000	Wishaw	Wishaw Juniors F.C.	WoSFL	2010	Grass	
90		Petershill Park	1,000	Glasgow	Petershill F.C. Glasgow City F.C. Rangers L.F.C.	WoSFL SWPL	2007	Artificial	

== See also ==
- List of association football stadiums by capacity
- List of British stadiums by capacity
- List of European stadiums by capacity
- List of Scottish Football League stadiums
- List of Scottish Professional Football League stadiums
- Scottish football attendance records
- Lists of stadiums
