= Scottish football attendance records =

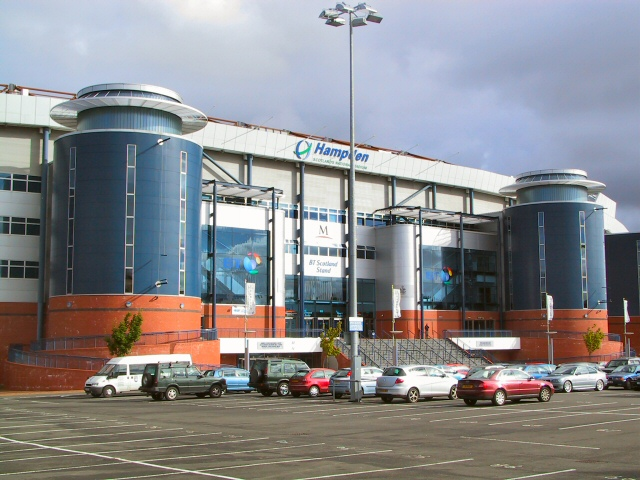
Hampden Park, Scotland's national football stadium, holds several Scottish and European attendance records.

This article lists Scottish football attendance records under the categories listed below. The highest ever attendance for a UEFA competition match was in the 1969–70 European Cup semi-final at Hampden Park, Scotland's national stadium. A record 136,505 people attended the match between Celtic and Leeds United. The attendance of 149,415 for the Scotland vs. England international match of 1937 at Hampden Park is also a European record. The attendance of 147,365 for the 1937 Scottish Cup final between Celtic and Aberdeen at Hampden Park is a European record for a club match. Rangers' record attendance of 118,567 at Ibrox is a British record for a league match.

== By club ==
=== Current SPFL member clubs ===
This is a list of all 42 Scottish Professional Football League clubs' record match attendances at their home ground. The vast majority of these records were achieved before the advent of all-seater stadia. The cost of building all-seater grounds, and a general decline in attendances, means the present capacities of the clubs stadiums are well below their record attendances. Some records were achieved at a club's previous ground, rather than their current location. For example, Clyde's record was set at Shawfield Stadium, whilst they have since moved to Broadwood Stadiumand New Douglas Park. Records set while ground-sharing or at a venue other than the club's home stadium are not included. For example, Celtic were the home team when 136,505 attended their 1969–70 European Cup semi-final second leg match against Leeds United, but the match was played at Hampden Park, not Celtic Park. Rangers' record attendance of 118,567 is also the British record for a league match.

Rank	Club	Attendance	Stadium	Opponent	Competition	Date	Refs
1	Rangers	118,567	Ibrox Park	Celtic	League	2 January 1939	
2	Queen's Park	95,722	Hampden Park	Rangers	Scottish Cup	18 January 1930	
3	Celtic	83,500 (Note: Newspaper reports at the time indicate that the officially returned attendance was given as 83,500, with an estimated further 10,000 supporters locked out of the ground for safety reasons. However, the ground's capacity was gauged at the time as being around 88,000 and several subsequent sources (including the club's official website) have since revised the attendance up to 92,000.)	Celtic Park	Rangers	League	1 January 1938	
4	Hibernian	65,860	Easter Road	Heart of Midlothian	League	2 January 1950	
5	Heart of Midlothian	53,396	Tynecastle Park	Rangers	Scottish Cup	13 February 1932	
6	Clyde	52,000	Shawfield Stadium	Rangers	League	21 November 1908	
7	Partick Thistle	49,838	Firhill Stadium	Rangers	League	18 February 1922	
8	St Mirren	47,438	Love Street	Celtic	League	20 August 1949	
9	Aberdeen	45,061	Pittodrie Stadium	Heart of Midlothian	Scottish Cup	3 March 1954	
10	Dundee	43,024	Dens Park	Rangers	Scottish Cup	7 February 1953	
11	Kilmarnock	35,995	Rugby Park	Rangers	Scottish Cup	10 March 1962	
12	Motherwell	35,632	Fir Park	Rangers	Scottish Cup	12 March 1952	
13	Raith Rovers	31,306	Stark's Park	Heart of Midlothian	Scottish Cup	7 February 1953	
14	St Johnstone	29,972	Muirton Park	Dundee	Scottish Cup	10 February 1951	
15	Hamilton Academical	28,690	Douglas Park	Heart of Midlothian	Scottish Cup	3 March 1937	
16	Dundee United	28,000	Tannadice Park	Barcelona	Inter-Cities Fairs Cup	16 November 1966	
17	Dunfermline Athletic	27,816	East End Park	Celtic	League	30 April 1968	
18	Queen of the South	26,552	Palmerston Park	Heart of Midlothian	Scottish Cup	23 February 1952	
19	Stirling Albion	26,400	Annfield Stadium	Celtic	Scottish Cup	14 March 1959	
20	Ayr United	25,225	Somerset Park	Rangers	League	13 September 1969	
21	Greenock Morton	23,500	Cappielow	Celtic	League	29 April 1922	
22	Falkirk	23,100	Brockville Park	Celtic	Scottish Cup	21 February 1953	
23	East Fife	22,515	Bayview Park (Note: Bayview Park refers to the old East Fife stadium, in use prior to 1998, rather than the current Bayview Stadium.)	Raith Rovers	League	2 January 1950	
24	Dumbarton	18,000	Boghead Park	Raith Rovers	Scottish Cup	2 March 1957	
25	Alloa Athletic	13,000	Recreation Park	Dunfermline Athletic	Scottish Cup	26 February 1939	
26	Arbroath	13,510	Gayfield Park	Rangers	Scottish Cup	22 February 1952	
27	Elgin City	12,608	Borough Briggs	Arbroath	Scottish Cup	17 February 1968	
28	Stenhousemuir	12,500	Ochilview Park	East Fife	Scottish Cup	11 March 1950	
29	Forfar Athletic	10,780	Station Park	Rangers	Scottish Cup	7 February 1970	
30	Livingston	10,112	Almondvale Stadium	Rangers	League	27 October 2001	
31	Airdrieonians	9,044	Excelsior Stadium	Rangers	League	23 August 2013	
32	Montrose	8,983	Links Park	Dundee	Scottish Cup	17 March 1973	
33	Peterhead	8,643	Recreation Park	Raith Rovers	Scottish Cup	25 February 1987	
34	Ross County	8,000	Victoria Park	Rangers	Scottish Cup	28 February 1966	
35	Inverness CT	7,711	Caledonian Stadium	Rangers	League	4 August 2007	(Note: Inverness' record attendance of 9,530 set on 26 October 2004 was set at Pittodrie Stadium, where the club was ground-sharing with Aberdeen.)
36	Stranraer	6,500	Stair Park	Rangers	Scottish Cup	24 January 1948	
37	Edinburgh City	2,522	Meadowbank Stadium	Hibernian	Friendly match	7 July 2016	
38	Annan Athletic	2,517	Galabank Stadium	Rangers	League	15 September 2012	
39	Kelty Hearts	2,300	New Central Park	Rangers	Friendly match	2012	
40	Cove Rangers	2,100	Allan Park	Deveronvale	Highland League	April/May 2009	
41	East Kilbride	924	K-Park Training Academy	Celtic B	Scottish Challenge Cup	11 November 2025	
42	The Spartans	Unknown					

=== Former SPFL member clubs ===
Club	Attendance	Stadium	Opponent	Competition	Date	Refs
Third Lanark	45,455	Cathkin Park	Rangers	Scottish Cup	27 February 1954	
Albion Rovers	27,381	Cliftonhill	Rangers	Scottish Cup	8 February 1936	
Cowdenbeath	25,586	Central Park	Rangers	League Cup	21 September 1949	
Airdrieonians	24,000	Broomfield Park	Heart of Midlothian	Scottish Cup	8 March 1952	
Clydebank	14,900	Kilbowie Park	Hibernian	Scottish Cup	10 February 1965	
Berwick Rangers	13,365	Shielfield Park	Rangers	Scottish Cup	28 January 1967	
East Stirlingshire	12,000	Firs Park	Partick Thistle	Scottish Cup	19 February 1921	
Brechin City	8,122	Glebe Park	Aberdeen	Scottish Cup	3 February 1973	
Gretna	3,000	Raydale Park	Dundee United	Scottish Cup	17 January 2005	(Note: Gretna's record attendance of 6,137 set on 16 January 2008 was set at Fir Park, where the club was ground-sharing with Motherwell.)

== Cup finals ==
The attendance of 147,365 for the 1937 Scottish Cup final between Celtic and Aberdeen at Hampden Park is a European record for a club match.

The attendance of 136,274 for the 1952 Scottish Cup final between Motherwell and Dundee is a Scottish record for a match not involving Celtic, Rangers or the Scotland national team.

While less than 50% of the all-time record crowds at Hampden, the attendance of 72,069 at the 1989 Scottish Cup final has become a landmark figure as no match in Scotland has come close to matching it since, owing to subsequent stadium modernisation which left no venue with a greater capacity.

Competition	Attendance	Stadium	Match	Date	Refs
Scottish Cup	147,365	Hampden Park	Celtic v Aberdeen	24 April 1937	
League Cup	107,609 (Note: The tournament record was set in 1947 when Rangers overcame Hibernian in a semi-final before 123,830.)	Hampden Park	Celtic v Rangers	25 October 1965	
Southern League Cup (Note: The Southern League Cup was an unofficial competition held during World War II. The last edition in 1945–46, which despite its name was a nationwide tournament, was held after the end of the conflict, and is considered by winners Aberdeen to be a major trophy.)	135,000	Hampden Park	Aberdeen v Rangers	11 May 1946	
Junior Cup	77,650	Hampden Park	Petershill v Irvine Meadow	19 May 1951	
Challenge Cup	48,133	Hampden Park	Rangers v Peterhead	10 April 2016	

== Scotland national team ==
This section lists the top ten attendances for the Scotland national team in home matches. The attendance of 149,415 for the Scotland vs. England match of 1937 at Hampden Park is a European record.

Rank	Attendance	Date	Stadium	Opponent	Competition	Score (Note: Scotland's score is shown first.)
1	149,415 (Note: Some sources list the attendance as 149,547)	17 April 1937	Hampden Park	England	BHC	3–1
2	149,269	15 April 1939	Hampden Park	England	BHC	1–2
3	137,438	25 April 1970	Hampden Park	England	BHC	0–0
4	135,376	10 April 1948	Hampden Park	England	BHC	0–2
5	134,544	3 April 1954	Hampden Park	England	BHC / WCQG3	2–4
6	134,504	5 April 1952	Hampden Park	England	BHC	1–2
7	134,170	1 April 1933	Hampden Park	England	BHC	2–1
8	134,000	24 February 1968	Hampden Park	England	BHC / ECQG8	1–1
9	133,300	15 April 1950	Hampden Park	England	BHC	0–1
10	133,245	11 April 1964	Hampden Park	England	BHC	1–0

Outwith Scotland fixtures, an exhibition match between Great Britain and the Rest of the World in 1947 attracted a crowd quoted as up to 137,000.

== European football ==
The attendance of 136,505 for the 1969–70 European Cup semi-final second leg between Celtic and Leeds United played at Hampden Park is the highest ever for a UEFA competition match.

The crowd of 127,621 at the 1960 European Cup final (Real Madrid 7–3 Eintracht Frankfurt) remains the record for any UEFA competition final. The highest attendance at a final involving a Scottish club (they have been involved in 11, including two in the UEFA Super Cup) was the home leg of the 1961 European Cup Winners' Cup final (Rangers 0–2 Fiorentina), when 80,000 attended Ibrox Park.

== See also ==
- List of football stadiums in Scotland
- Record home attendances of English football clubs
- Scottish stadium moves
