= History of football in Scotland =

This article details the history of football in Scotland.

== Early history (pre 1867) ==
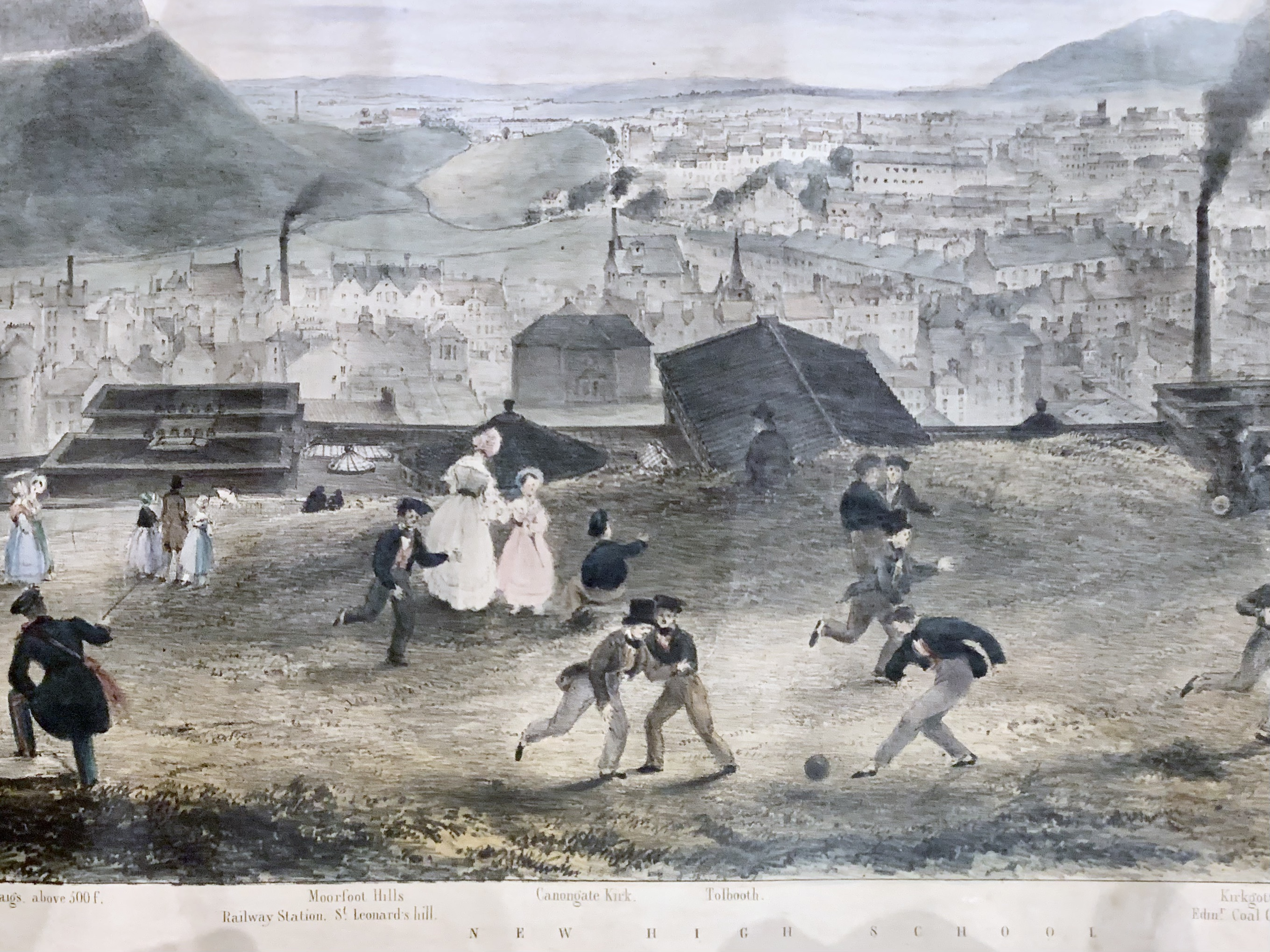
Football on Calton Hill, from Panorama of Edinburgh by Samuel Leith, c. 1840, at the Scottish National Gallery

The football origins in Scotland are uncertain. Early forms of it were played in England and France. Games of "football" were played in Scotland in the Middle Ages, but medieval football bears little resemblance to association football (soccer). The ball could be carried by hand, and teams were sometimes of dozens of players or more, with scrummaging involved. Some of these games are still played, notably in Kirkwall and Jedburgh – see Ba game.

The earliest reference to "fute-ball" in Scotland was in 1424 when King James I outlawed it in the Football Act 1424. Subsequent kings issued similar decrees, suggesting that the bans were unsuccessful. Certainly James VI of Scotland was well aware of the violent nature of football, writing in his 1599 Basilikon Doron, to debar from commendable exercise "all rough and violent exercises, as the foot-ball, meeter for laming than making able the users thereof". There were also times when royalty played the games themselves, with the accounts of the Lord High Treasurer in 1497 mentioning the purchase of footballs for James IV. There is also a tradition that King James V visited Jedburgh to play in the ball game there, although there is no evidence of this happening.

Violence in early Scottish football games was certainly an important reason for these royal decrees and further evidence comes from sixteenth century Scottish literature, for example in the following poems.

Between 1501 and 1512 Gavin Douglas states:

"This broken shin that swells and will not be relieved, Take it to him; he broke it at ball, And tell him it will be his reward. Take the whole of this bruised arm to him"

Sir Richard Maitland expresses his pleasure in a late sixteenth century poem at being too old for the rough game:

Quhen zoung men cummis fra the gren,
Playand at the futball had bein,
with broken spauld,
I thank my god I want ein,
I am so auld".

In modern English can be translated as:

When young men come from the green
Had been playing football
With broken shoulder,
I thank my God that I lack eyesight:
I am so old

The violence of early football in Scotland is also described vividly by another anonymous sixteenth century description, "The Beauties of Foot-ball":

Brissit, brawnis and broken banis,
Stryf, discorde and waistie wanis,
Cruikit in eild syn halt withall,
Thir are the bewties of the fute ball".

This in modern English is translated as:

Bruised muscles and broken bones
Strife, Discord, and futile blows
Lamed in old age, then crippled withal
These are the beauties of football"

It was not just the Scottish monarchy and local municipalities that passed laws on the playing of football. In Perth, apprentices progressing to become master craftsmen in the sixteenth century traditionally had to pay for a banquet and hold a football match. In 1546 the Company of Hammermen (i.e. smiths) of Perth issued a decree that "neither servants nor apprentices" should play football "under penalty of a pound of wax" to be given to their altar in the church. Presumably this was a measure to prevent work absences and injuries. There are other accounts of employers trying to ban football in Scotland over the following centuries.

Early Scottish football sometimes erupted into violence, including the use of firearms. At Lochtoun in 1606 during a "fute-ball" match some players "fell in contentioun and controversie, ilk anie with otheris, and schot and dilaschit pistolettis and hacquebuttis" It was clearly a passionate and dangerous pastime. Football in the sixteenth century is also documented as being a pretext for raids across the border against the English.

In an attempt to control such violent outbursts, and for religious reasons, football came under Puritan attack in the sixteenth and seventeenth centuries. It became an offence to play on a Sunday, with the youth of Aberdeen, for example, accused in 1607 of conducting themselves profanely on the Sabbath: "drinking, playing football... and roving from parish to parish" Further references to this offence come at the end of the sixteenth century and the first half of the seventeenth. In 1656 the Scottish Parliament passed an act outlawing all boisterous games on the Lord's day. Nevertheless, the Puritan attack on football was not as severe in Scotland as it was in England and continued to be played enthusiastically.

There is evidence that schoolboys played a ball game in Aberdeen in 1633 (some references cite 1636) which is notable some consider that it mentions passing the ball. The word "pass" is derived from "huc percute" (strike it here) and later "repercute pilam" (strike the ball again) in the original Latin. The original word translated as "goal" is "metum", literally meaning the "pillar at each end of the circus course" in a Roman chariot race. There is a reference to "get hold of the ball before [another player] does" (Praeripe illi pilam si possis agere) suggesting that handling of the ball was allowed. The original 1930 translation states "Throw yourself against him" (Age, objice te illi). It is clear that the game was rough and that tackles were allowed, included "charging" and pushing/holding of opposing players ("drive that man back" in the original translation, "repelle eum" in original Latin). It has been suggested that this game bears similarities to rugby football.

Violence continued to be a regular complaint about Scottish football games for many centuries. Sir Patrick Hume of Polwarth wrote to his wife in March 1648 that their son "hurt himself so evill at football in Polwart upon Sunday that he was not able to sturre". In Jedburgh the ball game was outlawed by the town council in 1704 because "sometimes both old and young near lost their lives thereby". As a result, it was decided to "discharge the game now and all time coming". However, even in 1706, local trades at Jedburgh were cooperating trying to suppress the game, as shown by the Fleshers' Corporation's fining of some members for "rastling at the football". Similarly at Duns in 1724 a complaint reads: "football... did always end and determine in the effusion of blood among the inhabitants". Toward the end of the eighteenth century the poet Skinner noted in his poems some of the injuries sustained playing foortball in Monymusk: "Has ne’er in Monymusk been seen Sae mony weel-beft skins; Of a' the ba'-men there was nane But had twa bleedy shins"

Sir Walter Scott described football as "his favourite border sport". He too, however, talks about the rough nature of nineteenth century Scottish football in "the Lay": "In riot, revelry, and rout, Pursued the football, play". Scott also states that in the "foot-ball...The victory is contested with the utmost fury, and very serious accidents have sometimes taken place in the struggle".

Scottish football continued to be a very violent affair well into the nineteenth century. For, example the game in Hawick was described in 1825 as "a species of war or fighting". In 1826 the game was banned in Kirkwall as it was disturbing the peace. From this time until the late 1860s there is a lull in references to football in Scotland, suggested that banning of the game had at last proved successful. As a result of the level of violence often seen in early Scottish football games, a lot of traditional ball games were modified or died out in the nineteenth century. Examples still exist today, however, of traditional Scottish football, in particular the Ba game (although many of these have been revived in the modern time).

The earliest evidence of the use of codified rules of any type of football in Scotland came in 1851 when rugby football was adopted by the Edinburgh Academy, in order to be able to play with other schools. The Edinburgh Academical Football Club, is the oldest football club of any code in Scotland (rugby football).

A "Foot Ball Club" was founded in Edinburgh in 1824 After being recently reformed, it now plays association football in the Edinburgh & District Sunday Amateur Association.

== Early modern history (1867–1900) ==
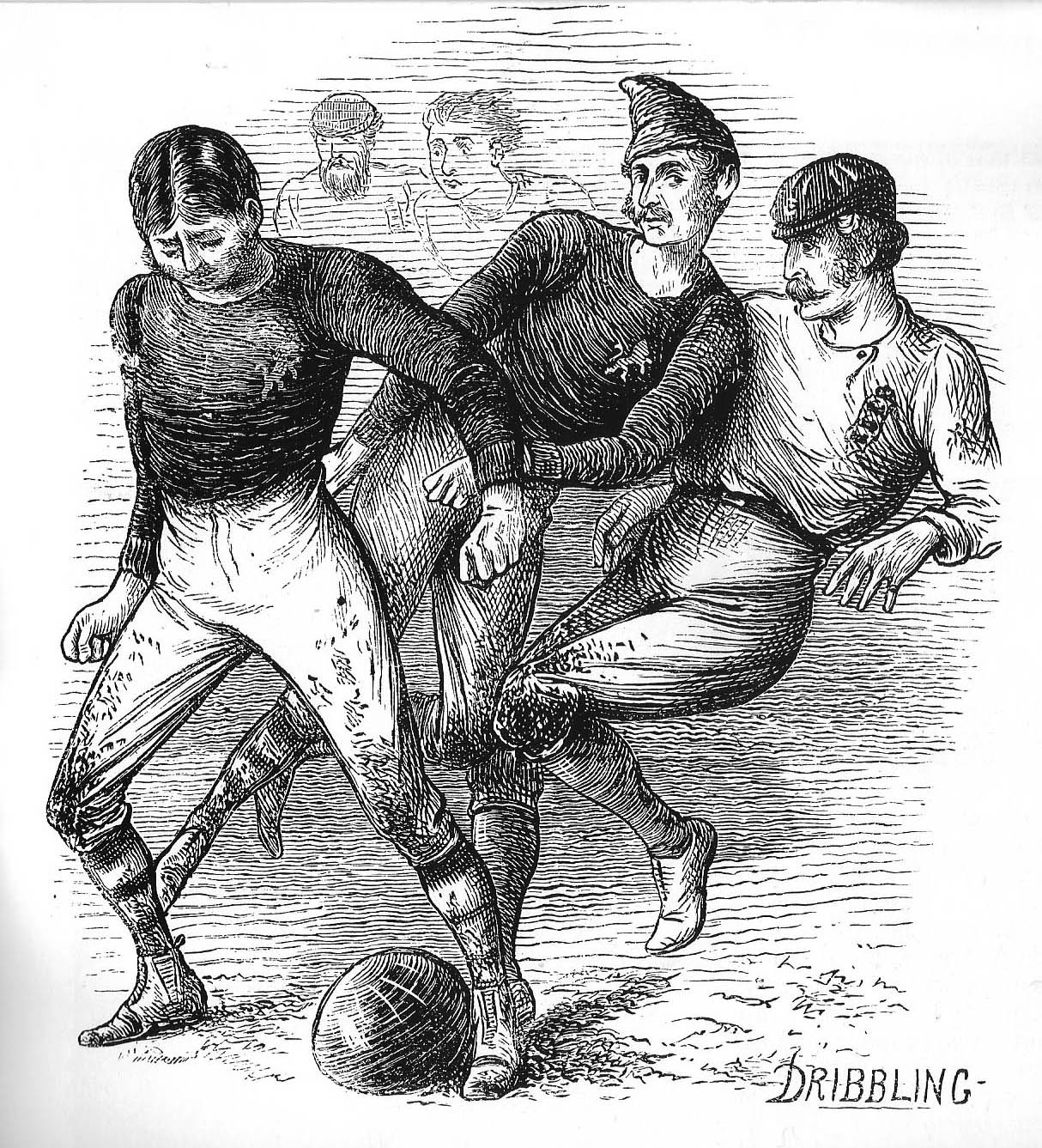
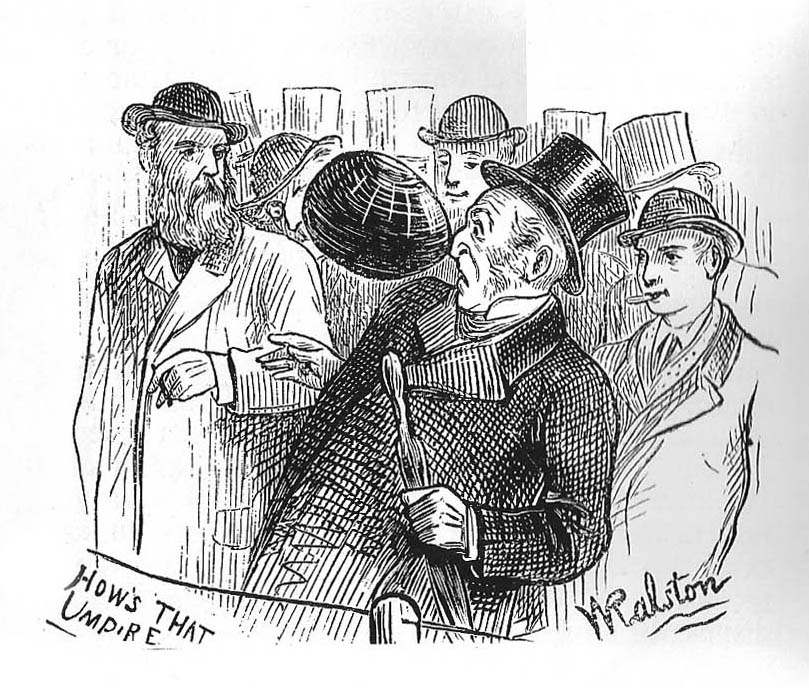
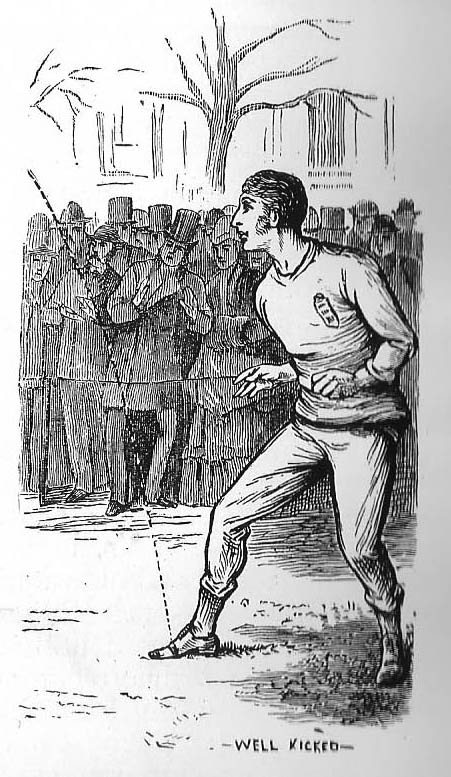
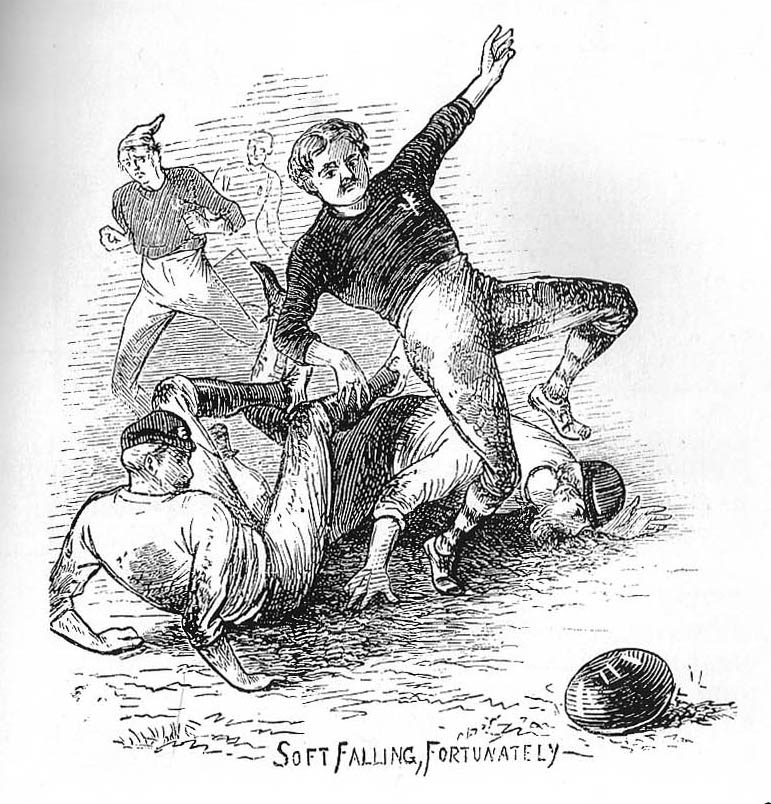
The first official football international, Scotland versus England. Once kept by the Rugby Football Union as an early example of rugby football.

Scotland was one of the earliest modern footballing nations. The game started to become popular in the country following the development in London in 1863 of the first ever rules of association football, established by The Football Association. Scottish football clubs started to be formed towards the end of the 1860s and 1870s, some in Glasgow introduced to a rudimentary version of the pursuit by men from Callander in Perthshire, this having its roots in traditional Handsel Monday holiday mass-participation games (which also led to the formation of some rugby clubs as efforts were made to formalise the rules of these chaotic events). Queen's Park was Scotland's first football club, founded in 1867. It is the oldest existing football club outside England.

In the late 1860s football rules in Scotland still allowed the ball to be handled by all the outfield players, as well as the goalkeeper, whereas in England only the keeper was permitted to handle the ball and then only in his own area. According to the Scotsman newspaper of 2 December 1872, at that time there were only about ten football clubs in Scotland.

Even as late as 1870, football was an unfamiliar sport in Scotland. In that year, C.W. Alcock received no response to his challenges issued in Scottish newspapers, including the Glasgow Herald, for homegrown contenders to face an English eleven. One response to Alcock's challenges illustrates that football was eclipsed in Scotland by other codes: "Mr Alcock's challenge to meet a Scotch eleven on the borders sounds very well and is doubtless well meant. But it may not be generally well known that Mr Alcock is a very leading supporter of what is called the "association game"... devotees of the "association" rules will find no foemen worthy of their steel in Scotland".

Between 1870 and 1872, a series of six matches between representatives of England and Scotland took place at The Oval, London. Robert Smith of Queen's Park played in the international matches against England of 19 November 1870, 25 February 1871 and 18 November 1871. The Queen's Park football club players R. Smith and J. Smith were named amongst 16 selected players in the publicity for the February 1872 match, and the reason for their absence is not clear. These early matches were organised under the auspices of the Football Association, but are not currently recognised by FIFA (founded 1904) as official internationals, although the Scotsman newspaper certainly identified them as "international in character" (the Scotsman's italics).

Alcock was categorical that although most players were London based, this was due to lack of response from north of the border:

"I must join issue with your correspondent in some instances. First, I assert that of whatever the Scotch eleven may have been composed the right to play was open to every Scotchman [Alcock's italics] whether his lines were cast North or South of the Tweed and that if in the face of the invitations publicly given through the columns of leading journals of Scotland the representative eleven consisted chiefly of Anglo-Scotians ... the fault lies on the heads of the players of the north, not on the management who sought the services of all alike impartially. To call the team London Scotchmen contributes nothing. The match was, as announced, to all intents and purposes between England and Scotland".

Alcock decided "in order to further the interests of the Association in Scotland, it was decided that during the current season, a team should be sent to Glasgow to play a match v Scotland" The first official (i.e. currently recognised by FIFA) international match would take place between Scotland and England on 30 November 1872, played under the Football Association rules. This match is, however, not the origin of the blue Scotland shirt, for contemporary reports of the earlier (5 February 1872) rugby international at the Oval clearly stated that "the scotch were easily distinguishable by their uniform of blue jerseys.... the jerseys having the thistle embroidered" The thistle had been worn previously in the 1871 rugby international

The match itself illustrated the advantage gained by the Queens Park players "through knowing each others' play" as all came from the same club. Contemporary match reports clearly show dribbling play by both the English and the Scottish sides, for example: "The Scotch now came away with a great rush, Leckie and others dribbling the ball so smartly that the English lines were closely besieged and the ball was soon behind", "Weir now had a splendid run for Scotland into the heart of his opponents' territory." and "Kerr.. closed the match by the most brilliant run of the day, dribbling the ball past the whole field" Scotland nearly won but a Robert Leckie shot landed on the tape crossbar and the game finished 0-0. Although the Scottish team are acknowledged to have worked better together during the first half, the contemporary account in the Scotsman newspaper acknowledges that in the second half England played similarly: "During the first half of the game the English team did not work so well together, but in the second half they left nothing to be desired in this respect." There is no specific description of a passing manoeuvre in the lengthy contemporary match reports, although two weeks' later The Graphic reported "[Scotland] seem to be adepts at passing the ball". There is no evidence in the article that the author attended the match, as the reader is clearly pointed to match descriptions in "sporting journals". Similarly, the 5 March 1872 match between Wanderers and Queen's Park contains no evidence of ball passing This contemporary evidence suggests that the origin of the short passing game lies in the mid-1870s.

In the next international in 1873 Scotland lost away to England in London, but in 1874 Scotland had their first international victory, beating England 4–2 in Glasgow. For his part, Alcock continued to pursue players from "north of the Tweed", inviting them in papers such as the Scotsman to contact(for example) A F Kinnaird". At this time, however, it was difficult for players to travel far for matches and even in the 1873 game, only three Scottish players were not drawn from English clubs. In 1875, the two nations drew again, but after this there followed a period of Scottish dominance for the following ten years, with only one defeat against the English.

Association football quickly became the most popular sport in Scotland, particularly in Glasgow and the west. The Scottish Cup was established in 1873, making it the second oldest football cup competition in the world. The Scottish Cup quickly grew to be a significantly larger tournament in terms of number of entrants than the FA Cup, with he early editions of the tournament dominated by Queen's Park and Vale of Leven, with the two teams winning the first nine editions. The Scottish Football Association was formed in 1873 and is the second oldest in the world, and the oldest national association.

=== League football and professionalism ===
In the late 1880s, significant number of Scottish players participated in English football teams. Payments to players had been made legal in England in 1885 and professional footballers were paid decent salaries, which attracted many Scottish players southwards to ply their trade in England. Some earned the epithet "Scotch Professors." In Scotland the game remained, in theory anyway, an amateur game, with Queen's Park at the forefront, reaching the final of the English FA Cup in 1884 and 1885. Scottish clubs stopped participating in the competition in 1887 due to their hostility towards professionalism, which also meant the many talented players that moved to England were ignored for national team selection purposes.

Preston North End, the first English team to win the Championship and Cup "double" in 1889, did so with a majority of their team being made up of Scottish players. Liverpool A.F.C. was founded in 1892 with a team full of Scots.

One of the other teams to benefit from the move of Scottish players to England, was Sunderland A.F.C. The club turned professional in 1885, and recruited a number of internationally capped Scotsmen the same year. Founder James Allan left Sunderland in 1888 because of his dislike for the "professionalism" that had been creeping into the club, and subsequently formed Sunderland Albion. The wealthy miner Samuel Tyzack, who alongside and shipbuilder Robert Turnbull funded the now professional "team of all talents," often pretended to be a priest while scouting for players in Scotland, as Sunderland's recruitment policy in Scotland enraged many Scottish fans. On 5 April 1890, the Football League's founder, William McGregor, labelled Sunderland as "the team of all talents" stating that they had "a talented man in every position". The Sunderland lineup in the 1895 World Championship was made from entirely Scottish players.

William McGregor, who grew up in Perthshire and lived most of his life in Birmingham, is credited with the establishment in 1888 of The Football League in England. This in turn influenced Scottish football and the Scottish Football League was founded in 1890; Dumbarton and Rangers were declared joint champions of the first league season after they could not be separated on points and a play-off match was drawn. The league became officially professional in 1893 (whereupon 560 players were registered as professionals) and added a second tier because of the rapidly growing number of clubs.

Between 1872 and 1929, Scotland played matches exclusively against the other three Home nations—England, Wales and Ireland. The British Home Championship began in 1884, making these games competitive. The encounters against England were particularly fierce and a rivalry quickly developed. Scotland dominated the early British Championships, winning or sharing with England every edition but one between 1884 and 1890. From then on results were poorer, with England winning four out of five between 1895 and 1900. This downturn in results and the adoption of professionalism at club level in Scotland in line with England led to the SFA relaxing their home-based player only rule in 1896, with the addition of 'Anglos' having a generally positive impact: Scotland claimed four of the next seven titles between 1896 and 1902.

In 1894 football was taken to Brazil by Charles William Miller, who was of combined Scottish-English descent. He had not lived in Scotland and learned to play football while at Banister Court School in Southampton, England.

== 1900–1946 ==
James I's ban on football was finally repealed in 1906 (although ignored long before then).

Competitive football was suspended in Scotland after the United Kingdom declared war on Nazi Germany in September 1939. Wartime competitions and internationals were played during the Second World War, but official competition did not resume until the 1946–47 season.

== 1946–1975 ==
Scottish football enjoyed something of a golden age after the Second World War. Attendance numbers boomed during the 1950s and club sides enjoyed success in the newly instigated European competitions. The most obvious example of this came in 1967, when Celtic became the first non-Latin club to win the European Cup. This success came during a period of domestic dominance for Celtic, who won nine consecutive Scottish league championships between 1966 and 1974. Other sides also enjoyed success, however, as Rangers won the 1972 European Cup Winners' Cup and both Hearts and Hibernian had great domestic success during the 1950s.

== 1975–1998 ==
The period of dominance by Celtic and declining attendances during the early 1970s resulted in officials considering changes to the Scottish game. Radical reforms were introduced to the league system in 1975, as a 10 team Premier Division was created. This marked a shift from clubs playing each other twice a season to four games a season in the Premier Division, and from two games to three games in the First Division and Second Division. This reform appeared to work initially, as Scottish clubs enjoyed European success during the 1980s. Unusually, the Old Firm dominance of Celtic and Rangers was broken by a New Firm of Aberdeen and Dundee United. Aberdeen won the 1983 European Cup Winners' Cup, defeating Bayern Munich and Real Madrid, and Dundee United reached the 1987 UEFA Cup Final, defeating FC Barcelona en route.

Rangers had endured a barren run during the early 1980s, but reasserted themselves after Graeme Souness was appointed manager in 1986 and was allowed to buy many senior England internationals. Players such as Chris Woods and Terry Butcher were attracted not just by the finances on offer, but also by the fact that Rangers still had access to European competition during a period when English clubs had been banned after the Heysel Stadium disaster. Rangers then entered a period of domestic dominance, winning nine consecutive Scottish League Championships from 1989 to 1997.

== 1998–2023 ==
As of the beginning of the 21st century, Scottish football was enjoying a resurgent period, with both halves of the Old Firm being involved in European competition after Christmas for the first time in decades – Celtic reached the 2003 UEFA Cup final and Rangers reached the 2008 UEFA Cup final, while both progressed to the last 16 of the UEFA Champions League.

The Old Firm rivalry was interrupted in 2012, when the company running Rangers went into liquidation and the club was forced to restart in the fourth tier of Scottish football. They and Celtic met twice in the domestic cup competitions in 2015 and 2016 during Rangers' spell out of the top league. The rivalry resumed again when Rangers were promoted into the Scottish Premiership in for the 2016–17 season, with the previous large points gap between the pair and other clubs, which had been maintained by Celtic alone (Aberdeen usually heading the rest in that period) gradually returning to a duopoly over the next few years. Celtic matched the existing nine in a row record of titles in 2020, but Rangers broke the sequence in 2020–21 with an unbeaten season, while St Johnstone won a rare cup double (the first outwith the Glasgow clubs since 1990). Rangers then reached the 2022 UEFA Europa League final, although Celtic re-established their grip on the domestic trophies.

== See also ==
- History of the Scotland national football team
- Scottish clubs in the FA Cup
- Scotch Professors
