= Scotland national football team manager =

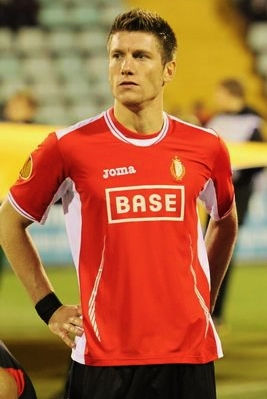
Sébastien Pocognoli, the current Scotland manager (pictured in 2011).

The role of a Scotland national football team manager was first established in May 1954, when Andy Beattie was appointed. Beattie took charge of six matches before and during the 1954 FIFA World Cup, when Scotland competed at their first major tournament. Twenty-five men have occupied the post since its inception, with Beattie, Jock Stein and Alex McLeish occupying it in two spells. Six of those managers were in caretaker or interim roles. Craig Brown held the position for the longest to date; a tenure of nine years, comprising two major tournaments and a total of 71 matches, although Steve Clarke managed more games (81) in his seven years in charge.

No manager has progressed beyond the first group stage of a major competition, even though Scotland qualified for several between 1954 and 1998. Beattie (1954), Dawson Walker (1958), Willie Ormond (1974), Ally MacLeod (1978), Stein (1982), Alex Ferguson (1986), Andy Roxburgh (1990 and 1992), Brown (1996 and 1998) and Clarke (2020, 2024 and 2026) have all managed the team at major competitions. Ian McColl, Ormond and MacLeod all won the British Home Championship outright.

German coach Berti Vogts became the first foreign manager of the team in 2002, but his time in charge was generally seen as a failure and the FIFA World Ranking declined to an all-time low of 88 in March 2005. Walter Smith and Alex McLeish achieved better results, with the ranking improving to an all-time high of 13 in October 2007, but both were only briefly in charge before returning to club management. George Burley and Craig Levein both had worse results with the team and were eventually sacked. Results improved somewhat under Gordon Strachan, but he was unable to secure qualification for a tournament. After McLeish had a second spell as manager, Steve Clarke was appointed in May 2019. Clarke guided the team to qualification for Euro 2020, their first major competition since 1998, Euro 2024, and the 2026 World Cup. He resigned after that tournament and was replaced by Sébastien Pocognoli in August 2026.

== Position ==
=== Role ===
The Scotland manager has sole responsibility for all on-the-field elements of the Scotland team. Among other activities, this includes selecting the national team squad, the starting lineup, captain, tactics, substitutes and penalty-takers. The manager has input in selecting the coaching ("back room") staff. For example, in 2008 manager George Burley helped to recruit Terry Butcher, a former teammate at Ipswich Town, as his assistant. The Scotland manager may also involve himself in wider issues beyond the on-the-field team issues, such as negotiating fixtures. In the period before a manager was appointed, the team was picked by the international selection committee of the Scottish Football Association (SFA). This committee was made up of officials from Scottish clubs, who had responsibility for picking their own sides. There were large inconsistencies in selection, however, and players were often picked without some or all of the selectors having watched them play.

=== Appointment ===
The process of appointing a new Scotland manager is undertaken by the main SFA board. After a review was conducted by former First Minister of Scotland Henry McLeish, the SFA board structure was streamlined considerably in 2011. Professional game and non-professional game boards govern their respective areas of football, while the main board has a strategic focus. There are seven members on the main board, consisting of three SFA office bearers, representatives from the professional and non-professional boards, and two independent members. As of September 2023, these positions were occupied by Mike Mulraney (SFA president), Ian Maxwell (SFA chief executive), Les Gray (SFA vice-president), Andrew McKinlay (Professional Game Board chair), Aileen Campbell (Non-Professional Game Board chair) and independent members Ana Stewart and Malcolm Kpedekpo.

All but one of the 24 people to manage Scotland had played the game professionally. The exception is Dawson Walker, who was placed in interim charge of the team while Matt Busby was recovering from injuries suffered in the Munich air disaster. Of the 23 Scotsmen to hold the post of manager, nine were never capped for the senior Scotland team as a player (Walker, Stein, Prentice, MacDonald, MacLeod, Roxburgh, C. Brown, Smith and Stark), although some of them did represent the Scottish Football League (Stein, Prentice and MacDonald). Of the 14 that played for Scotland, two earned 50 caps or more (McLeish and Strachan), while four also served as Scotland captains (Docherty, McLeish, Levein and Strachan). Berti Vogts, the only foreign manager to hold the post, earned 96 caps for West Germany and was part of their 1974 World Cup winning side.

== History ==
=== 1950s: Selection committee and temporary managers ===
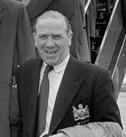
Matt Busby managed Scotland in two matches in 1958

Until 1954, the Scotland team was managed by a SFA selection committee. The role of manager was first established in May 1954 with the appointment of Andy Beattie, who took charge on a part-time basis while continuing as manager of Huddersfield Town. Beattie took the team to the 1954 FIFA World Cup, but the SFA only allowed him to select a travelling party of 13 players. Beattie, who felt this restriction made it impossible for him to perform his duties well, resigned during the tournament. Scotland were eliminated from the tournament after a 7–0 defeat by Uruguay.

After the 1954 World Cup, the selection committee resumed their duties, continuing until the appointment of Matt Busby in 1958. Busby was initially unable to assume his duties due to the serious injuries he sustained in the Munich air disaster, with Dawson Walker taking charge of the team while Busby recovered. Busby only took charge of two Scotland matches, but he did give a young Denis Law his first Scotland cap. In March 1959, Andy Beattie became Scotland manager for a second time. During his second spell as Scotland manager, Beattie combined those duties with managing a football club. He resigned in November 1960 in order to manage English club Nottingham Forest on a full-time basis.

=== 1960s ===
Ian McColl, who had just retired from a long playing career with Rangers, was appointed Scotland manager in 1960. He enjoyed significant success, winning British Home Championships in 1962 and 1963 and had an impressive winning percentage. McColl left the team in 1965 to become manager of Sunderland.

Celtic manager Jock Stein was then appointed manager of Scotland on a part-time basis. Stein took charge of their attempt to qualify for the 1966 World Cup. Scotland achieved good results in their first two qualifiers, a draw against Poland and a win against Finland. Stein was criticised by the Scottish press after the team conceded two late goals and lost 2–1 at home to Poland, but they managed to beat Italy 1–0 at Hampden Park to raise some hope of qualification. Scotland suffered from several players withdrawing from the return match against Italy due to injury and a 3–0 defeat meant that they failed to qualify. Clyde manager John Prentice then took the job on a full-time basis in 1966, but left to manage Dundee after just six months and four games in charge.

After Malky MacDonald took charge of two games on a caretaker basis, Bobby Brown was appointed manager. Brown was the first Scotland manager to be given full control of the team, as until then the SFA selection committee had continued to choose the players. Scotland achieved one of their most famous victories in his first game in charge, a 3–2 win against 1966 World Cup winners England at Wembley. The team generally performed well under Brown, but were drawn with West Germany in 1970 FIFA World Cup qualification. Scotland needed to avoid defeat in Hamburg to keep their qualification hopes alive, but lost 3–2.

=== 1970s ===
Tommy Docherty was appointed manager in 1971 and had a brief, but successful, time in charge. Docherty lost only three of his 12 matches as manager, but he left the job in late 1972 to become manager of Manchester United. Despite losing 5–0 to England in his first match in charge, Scotland qualified for the 1974 World Cup under the management of Willie Ormond. Scotland performed creditably at the finals, winning against Zaire and drawing against Brazil and Yugoslavia, but were eliminated on goal difference. Ormond suffered from player indiscipline during his tenure, which included an infamous incident where Jimmy Johnstone, after a night out drinking, sat in a rowing boat that was drifting out to sea. Two teammates attempted to rescue Johnstone, but eventually he had to be retrieved by local fishermen. Ormond left the Scotland job in 1977 to become manager of Hearts.

Ally MacLeod had an immediate impact as Scotland manager, winning against England at Wembley. His team then qualified for the 1978 FIFA World Cup by defeating Wales at Anfield, although Scotland were controversially given a penalty kick. MacLeod was confident about the team's prospects, quipping that his plan for after the World Cup was to "retain it". The supporters shared in this enthusiasm, as Hampden Park was packed for a farewell parade before the team flew to the tournament, hosted by Argentina. MacLeod dismissed his first two opponents, Peru and Iran, as "old men" and "minnows" respectively. A defeat by Peru and a draw with Iran left Scotland needing to defeat the Netherlands by three clear goals to qualify. MacLeod made a number of contested selection decisions, preferring the out of form Don Masson and Bruce Rioch to Graeme Souness. Winger Willie Johnston failed a drugs test after the Peru match and was sent home. Scotland produced an outstanding performance against the Netherlands and won 3–2, but were eliminated on goal difference. MacLeod stayed on as Scotland manager after the World Cup, but resigned after a defeat by Austria in September 1978. Writers have since considered the question of whether MacLeod was the cause of a lack of Scottish self-confidence, or was someone who tried to counter it.

=== 1978–1986: Stein and Ferguson ===
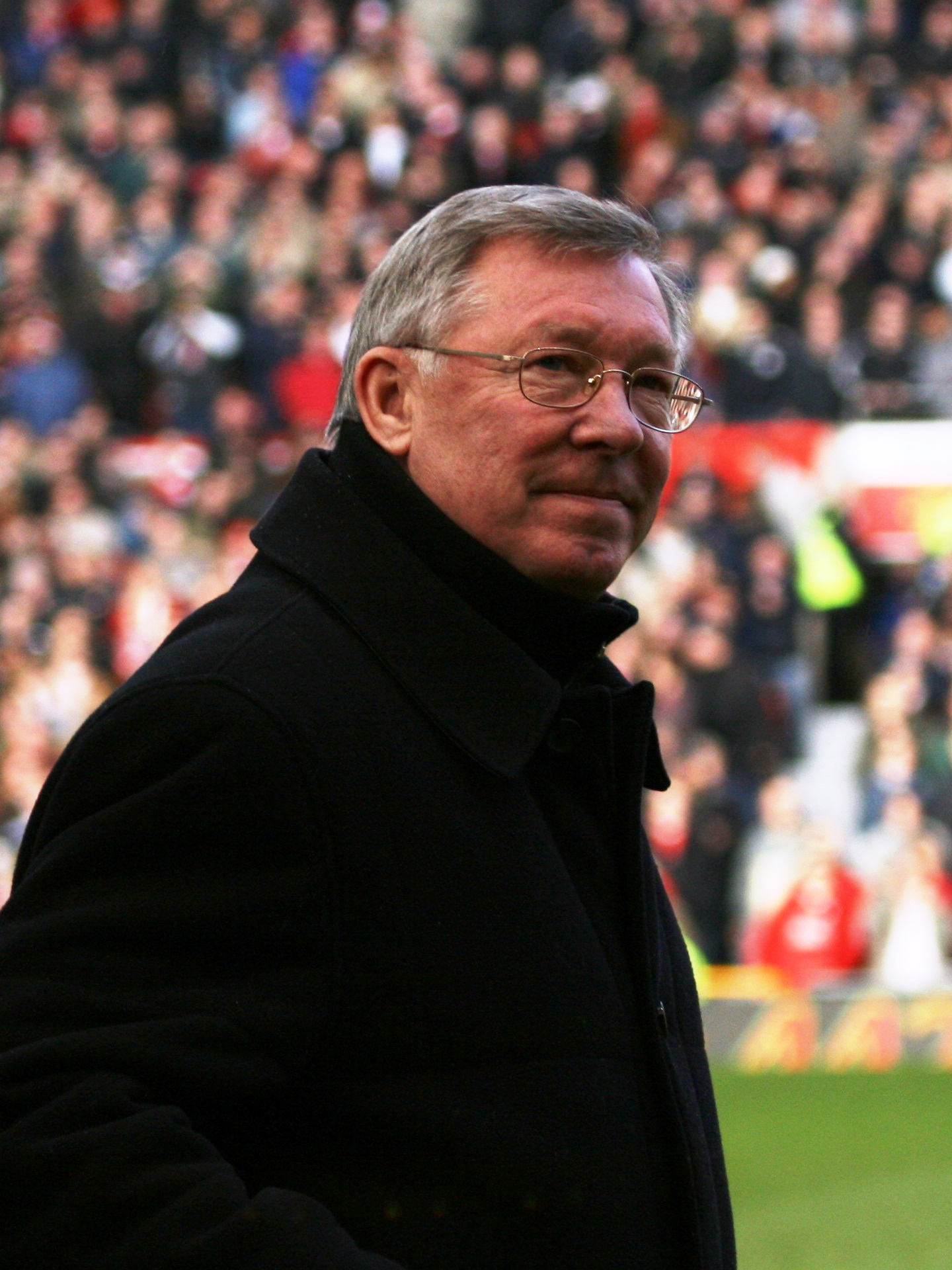
Alex Ferguson managed Scotland at the 1986 FIFA World Cup

Jock Stein, who was working as manager of Leeds United, was recruited by the SFA to manage the Scotland team for a second time. Two defeats to Belgium meant that Scotland failed to qualify for the 1980 European Championship. This was followed by losses to Northern Ireland and England in the 1980 British Home Championship, which led to some criticism in the media. Scotland qualified for the 1982 World Cup in Spain, but exited on goal difference after they drew 2–2 with the Soviet Union in a must-win game. Scotland then failed to qualify for the 1984 European Championship, which led to criticism of Stein leading into the next competition, the 1986 World Cup. As a consequence, Stein was facing significant pressure to ensure qualification for the tournament in Mexico.

Scotland defeated Spain 3–1, but then lost 1–0 at home to Wales. This left Scotland needing to secure at least a point from their final group match, against Wales in Cardiff, to qualify for a play-off against Australia. Stein was not helped by the fact that a number of his senior players, including Graeme Souness (his captain), Kenny Dalglish, Alan Hansen and Steve Archibald would all miss the game through injury or suspension. Stein had been taking diuretics, to reduce pressure on his heart, since the home defeat by Wales. Despite his enthusiasm for the job, these strains had let to Stein indicating that he would step down after the World Cup Finals in Mexico. Scotland drew 1–1 thanks to a late penalty kick by Davie Cooper, but Stein suffered a fatal heart attack. Assistant manager Alex Ferguson took temporary charge of the team until the 1986 World Cup, from which Scotland were eliminated in the group stage.

=== 1986–2001: Roxburgh and Brown ===
After the 1986 World Cup, the SFA appointed their Director of Coaching, Andy Roxburgh, as the national team manager. Scotland failed to qualify for UEFA Euro 1988, but Roxburgh then guided Scotland to qualification for the 1990 FIFA World Cup. Scotland defeated Argentina in a pre-tournament friendly, but were eliminated in the group stage with one win (against Sweden) and two losses. The team then qualified for UEFA Euro 1992, the first time Scotland had qualified for a European championship finals. Roxburgh resigned in September 1993 after failing to qualify for the 1994 FIFA World Cup.

Roxburgh was succeeded by Craig Brown, who had been his assistant. Brown had first joined the Scotland coaching setup in 1986, when the team was managed by Alex Ferguson. His appointment was greeted critically, as Brown had a low-profile career in football beforehand. Despite limited resources, Brown managed to lead Scotland to qualification for two major tournaments, UEFA Euro 1996 and the 1998 FIFA World Cup. Scotland played well in a narrow defeat against Brazil and a draw against Norway, but were eliminated after suffering a 3–0 defeat against Morocco. During 2002 FIFA World Cup qualification, Brown continued to rely on a group of ageing players, including Colin Hendry and Tom Boyd. None of his strikers were playing regularly for their clubs and the team lacked pace. Brown resigned immediately after the last qualification match.

=== 2001–2020: Qualification drought ===
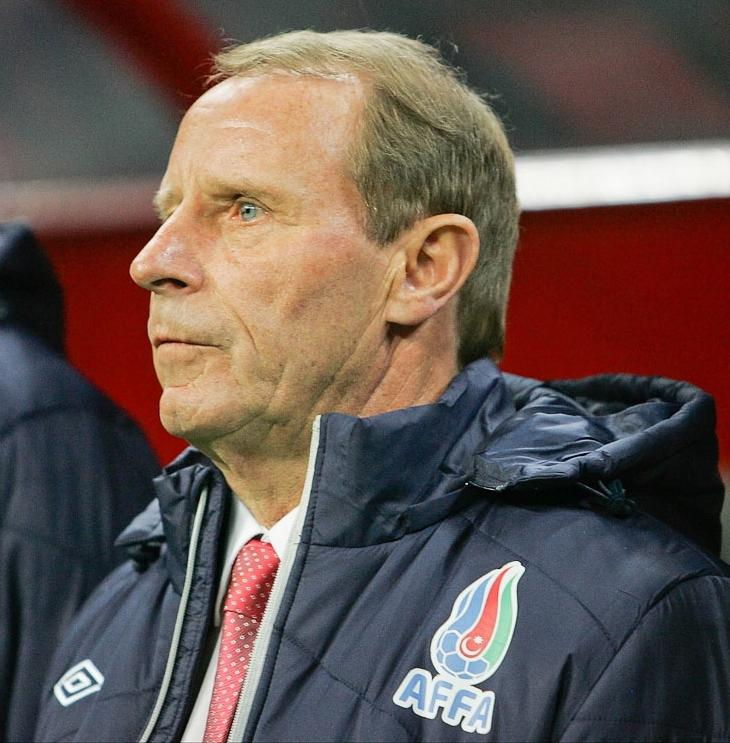
Berti Vogts was the first foreign manager of the team, appointed in 2002

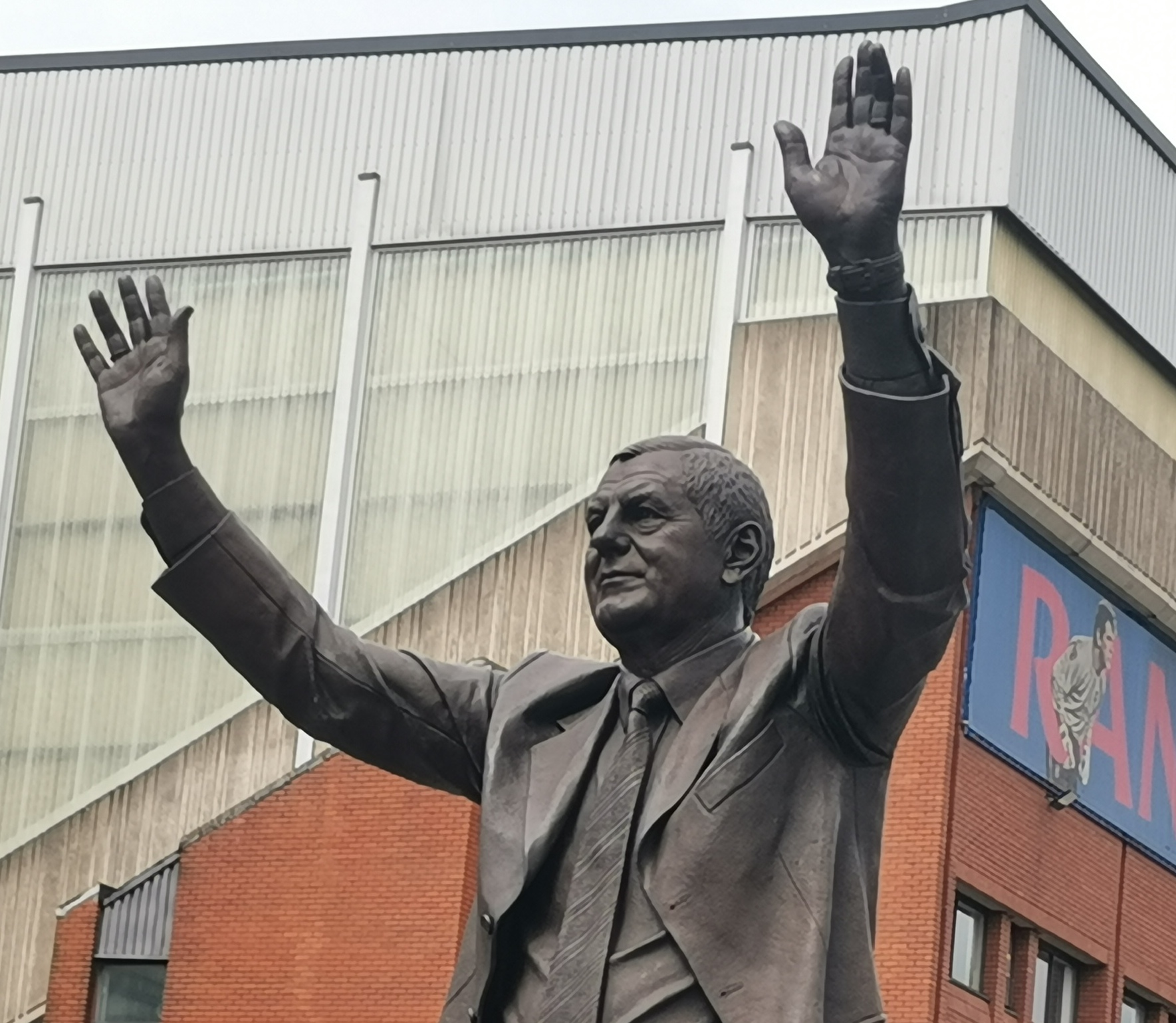
Walter Smith was Scotland manager for just over two years

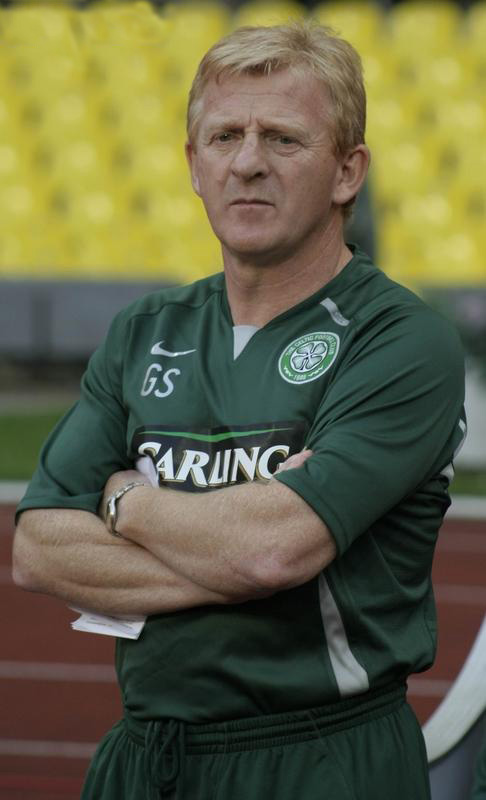
Gordon Strachan, Scotland manager from 2013 to 2017, pictured in 2007

Former Germany manager Berti Vogts was appointed Scotland manager in January 2002. A number of players retired from international football after Craig Brown resigned, which meant that Vogts had to build a new squad. He tried new players and formations, but the team suffered a number of heavy defeats in early friendly fixtures. Scotland reached the UEFA Euro 2004 qualification play-offs and won the first leg at home against the Netherlands, but were then beaten 6–0 in the return match. Vogts continued as manager into the 2006 FIFA World Cup qualification matches, but resigned after the team took just two points from their first three matches. Debate about why Vogts had failed centred on whether Scotland had sufficient playing talent to compete, or if poor results had been due to his own failings.

By the time Walter Smith had been appointed manager, Scotland had dropped to a record low position in the FIFA World Rankings. Smith was credited with creating a "club atmosphere" within the national squad. Scotland performed well in the early stages of a tough UEFA Euro 2008 qualification group, but Smith resigned from the Scotland job in January 2007 to manage Rangers. Alex McLeish was hired to replace Smith. Scotland continued to pursue qualification for Euro 2008 under McLeish, but were eliminated after losing against Italy in the final match. McLeish left the Scotland job soon afterwards, to manage Birmingham City. Despite failing to qualify for a tournament, the improved results under both Smith and McLeish lifted Scotland to 13th place in the world rankings.

George Burley was appointed manager in January 2008. Burley suffered from disruptions to the squad. During a goalless home draw against Norway, Burley substituted in Chris Iwelumo, who missed an open goal from 3 yards. Striker Kris Boyd, who had been left on the bench, announced his retirement from international football. Burley dropped Barry Ferguson and Allan McGregor from the team for a qualifying match against Iceland after it was reported they had been drinking through the night at the team hotel. The two players made gestures at photographers while sitting on the substitutes' bench during the match against Iceland and were then banned by the SFA. Despite failing to qualify for the 2010 FIFA World Cup, the SFA initially decided to keep Burley in the job, but then decided to dismiss him after a heavy defeat in a friendly match against Wales.

Dundee United manager Craig Levein was appointed in December 2009. Levein was heavily criticised by the media for his decision to play without any strikers in a Euro 2012 qualifier against the Czech Republic, which Scotland lost 1–0. Levein continued to defend this tactical approach, even after he had left the position. Scotland failed to qualify for Euro 2012, but Levein argued that the team was improving. For 2014 World Cup qualification, Levein and the SFA successfully pushed for Scotland to have their first two fixtures at home. This policy backfired, however, as Scotland could only draw those two matches. Defeats in following away matches against Wales and Belgium resulted in Levein being sacked by the SFA.

Gordon Strachan was appointed to replace Levein. Strachan was credited with improving the fortunes of the team in his first year in charge, as Scotland achieved victories against Croatia (twice), Macedonia and Norway. In UEFA Euro 2016 qualifying, Scotland appeared to have a better chance of qualification as the finals tournament was expanded from 16 teams to 24, but were drawn in a tough group with Germany, Poland and Republic of Ireland. After losing their opening match in Germany, Scotland recorded home wins against Georgia, Ireland and Gibraltar, and away draws against Poland and Ireland. In their following game Scotland produced an "insipid" performance, as they lost 1–0 in Georgia. A home defeat by Germany and a late equalising goal by Poland eliminated Scotland from contention. After a win against Gibraltar in the last qualifier, Strachan agreed a new contract with the SFA. Improved results in the later part of 2018 FIFA World Cup qualification gave Scotland a chance of play-off place, but a 2–2 draw at Slovenia ended those hopes. On 12 October 2017, Strachan left his position by mutual consent.

After a failed attempt to recruit Northern Ireland manager Michael O'Neill, Alex McLeish was appointed in February 2018 for a second stint as Scotland manager. Scotland won their 2018–19 UEFA Nations League group under McLeish, which secured a place in the UEFA Euro 2020 qualifying play-offs. McLeish left in April 2019 after a bad start to UEFA Euro 2020 qualifying, which included a 3–0 loss against 117th-ranked Kazakhstan.

=== 2020–present: Three tournament qualifications ===
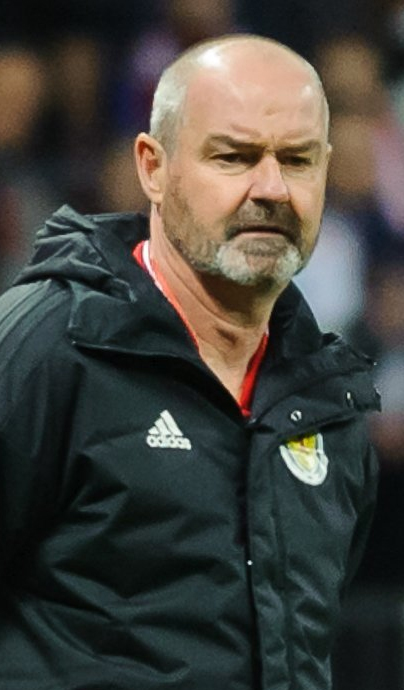
Steve Clarke, Scotland manager from 2019 to 2026

Kilmarnock manager Steve Clarke was appointed Scotland manager in May 2019. Penalty shootout victories in the playoffs against Israel and Serbia put Scotland into UEFA Euro 2020, their first major finals since 1998. In the tournament Scotland drew with England at Wembley, but defeats at Hampden to Czech Republic and Croatia meant that Scotland finished bottom of Group D. Six consecutive wins later that year meant that Scotland finished second in Group F of 2022 FIFA World Cup qualification. This progressed the team into the play-offs, where they lost 3–1 to Ukraine in a semi-final at Hampden. Later that year, Scotland won promotion to League A by winning their League B group in the 2022–23 competition.

Five consecutive wins at the start of Euro 2024 qualifying secured a place in the Euro 2024 finals with two matches to spare. Defeats by Germany and Hungary, either side of a draw with Switzerland, meant that the team failed to progress through the group stage of Euro 2024.

They were then relegated back to League B in the 2024–25 competition, after losing a playoff against Greece.

During 2026 FIFA World Cup qualification, Clarke became the Scotland manager with the most games taken charge of. They beat Denmark 4–2 at home in the last match of the section to qualify for their ninth World Cup finals, and their first since 1998. Clarke signed a new four-year contract ahead of the finals. Following the 2026 World Cup Clarke resigned following a narrow win over Haiti and defeats against Morocco and Brazil, finishing third in their group but being eliminated from contention as one of the best placed third place teams.

Belgian coach Sébastien Pocognoli was appointed as the new manager.

== Statistical summary ==
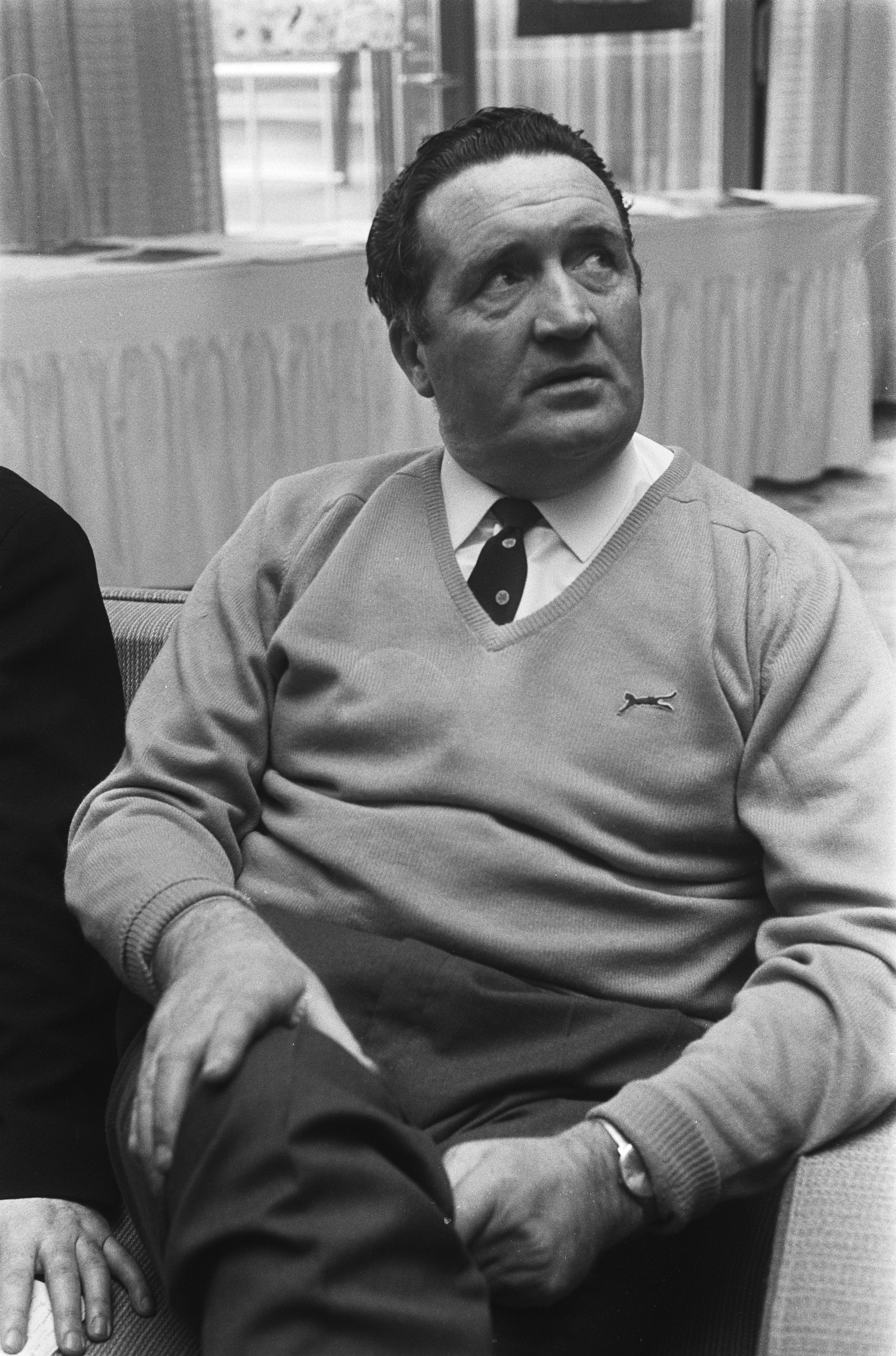
Jock Stein managed the Scotland team in two spells and led the team into the 1982 FIFA World Cup.

The following table provides a summary of the complete record of each Scotland manager, including their progress in both the World Cup and the European Championship. Statistically the most successful manager was Alex McLeish, who won seven of the ten games in his first spell. Discounting managers who took charge of less than ten games, the least successful manager was George Burley, with just three wins in 14 games.

Name	Scotland career	Played	Won	Drawn	Lost	Win %	PPG
Selection committee	1872–1953	231	139	42	50	60.17	1.99
Andy Beattie	1954	6	2	1	3	33.33	1.17
Selection committee	1954–1957	23	10	7	6	43.48	1.61
Dawson Walker (Note: Dawson Walker was left in charge of the players due to the Munich air disaster, in which official manager Matt Busby was seriously injured.)	1958	6	1	2	3	16.67	0.83
Matt Busby	1958	2	1	1	0	50.00	2
Andy Beattie	1959–1960	12	3	3	6	25.00	1
Ian McColl	1960–1965	28	17	3	8	60.71	1.93
Jock Stein	1965–1966	7	3	1	3	42.86	1.43
John Prentice	1966	4	0	1	3	0.00	0.25
Malky McDonald (Note: Served as manager on a caretaker basis.)	1966–1967	2	1	1	0	50.00	2
Bobby Brown	1967–1971	33	14	8	11	42.42	1.52
Tommy Docherty	1971–1972	12	7	2	3	58.33	1.92
Willie Ormond	1973–1977	38	18	8	12	47.37	1.63
Ally MacLeod	1977–1978	17	7	5	5	41.18	1.53
Jock Stein	1978–1985	61	26	12	23	42.62	1.48
Alex Ferguson (Note: Alex Ferguson was interim manager, following the death of Jock Stein.)	1985–1986	10	3	4	3	30.00	1.3
Andy Roxburgh	1986–1993	61	23	19	19	37.70	1.44
Craig Brown (Note: Craig Brown's record includes one 1993 match in interim charge (Italy 3–1 Scotland) prior to his full appointment; it is not included in his SFA website profile, which assigns no manager to this fixture.)	1993–2002	71	32	18	21	45.07	1.61
Berti Vogts	2002–2004	32	9	7	16	28.13	1.06
Tommy Burns	2004	1	0	0	1	0.00	0
Walter Smith	2004–2007	16	7	5	4	43.75	1.63
Alex McLeish	2007	10	7	0	3	70.00	2.1
George Burley	2008–2009	14	3	3	8	21.43	0.86
Craig Levein	2009–2012	24	10	5	9	41.67	1.46
Billy Stark	2012	1	1	0	0	100.00	3
Gordon Strachan	2013–2017	40	19	9	12	47.50	1.65
Malky Mackay	2017	1	0	0	1	0.00	0
Alex McLeish	2018–2019	12	5	0	7	41.67	1.25
Steve Clarke (Note: Steve Clarke's profile at the SFA website records penalty shootout victories over Israel and Serbia in 2020 as wins; most statistical resources record the outcome of such matches as a draw, albeit the winner of the shootout progresses, and they have been counted as draws in the table.)	2019–2026	81	36	16	29	44.44	1.53
Sébastien Pocognoli	2026–present	6	2	1	3	33.33	1.4
Totals		861	406	184	271	47.15	1.63

Last updated: Scotland v North Macedonia, 13 November 2026. Statistics include official FIFA-recognised matches, five matches from the 1967 SFA tour that were reclassified as full internationals in 2021, and a match against a Hong Kong League XI played on 23 May 2002 that the Scottish Football Association includes in its statistical totals.

=== British Home championships ===
The following table provides a summary of results for each Scotland manager in the British Home Championship, held annually until the 1983–84 season.

Manager	Scotland career	P	W	S	%	Titles	Notes
Andy Beattie	1954	—	—	—	—	—	(Note: Beattie took charge of one game in the 1953–54 British Home Championship.)
Dawson Walker	1958	—	—	—	—	—	(Note: Walker took charge of one game in the 1957–58 British Home Championship.)
Matt Busby	1958	—	—	—	—	—	(Note: Busby took charge of two games in the 1958–59 British Home Championship.)
Andy Beattie	1959–1960	1	0	1	0	—	(Note: Beattie took charge of one game in the 1958–59 and the 1960–61 championships.)
Ian McColl	1960–1965	4	2	1	50	1961–62, 1962–63	(Note: McColl took charge of two games in the 1960–61 British Home Championship.)
Jock Stein	1965–1966	—	—	—	—	—	(Note: Stein took charge of two games and Prentice took charge of one game in the 1965–66 British Home Championship.)
John Prentice	1966	—	—	—	—	—	
Malky MacDonald	1966–1967	—	—	—	—	—	(Note: MacDonald took charge of two games and Brown took charge of one game in the 1966–67 British Home Championship, which Scotland won outright.)
Bobby Brown	1967–1971	4	0	1	0	—	
Tommy Docherty	1971–1972	1	0	1	0	—	—
Willie Ormond	1973–1977	4	1	1	25	1975–76	—
Ally MacLeod	1977–1978	2	1	0	50	1976–77	—
Jock Stein	1978–1985	5	0	0	0	—	(Note: The 1981 British Home Championship was abandoned due to civil unrest in Northern Ireland. The last British Home Championship was played in 1984.)

Key: P–Number of complete tournaments played, (Note: Only British Home Championships managed entirely by each manager are included) W–Number of tournaments won, S–Number of tournaments shared, %–win percentage
