= Bobby Brown (footballer, born 1923) =

Scottish footballer and manager (1923–2020)

Personal information
- Full name: Robert Brown
- Date of birth: 19 March 1923
- Place of birth: Denny, Stirlingshire, Scotland
- Date of death: 15 January 2020 (aged 96)
- Place of death: Helensburgh, West Dunbartonshire, Scotland
- Position: Goalkeeper

Senior career*
Years	Team	Apps	(Gls)
1939–1946	Queen's Park	0	(0)
1946–1956	Rangers	211	(0)
1956–1958	Falkirk	23	(0)

International career
1945–1946	Scotland (wartime)	5	(0)
1946–1952	Scotland	5	(0)
1949–1952	Scottish League	8	(0)

Managerial career
- 1958–1967: St Johnstone
- 1967–1971: Scotland
- * Club domestic league appearances and goals

Robert Brown (19 March 1923 – 15 January 2020) was a Scottish international football player and manager. He played as a goalkeeper for Queen's Park, Rangers and Falkirk and made five international appearances for Scotland. He managed St Johnstone at club level and the Scotland national team from 1967 to 1971. Brown was inducted into the Scottish Football Hall of Fame in 2015.

== Playing career ==
=== Club ===
Brown was born in Anderson Drive, Denny, Stirlingshire. He made his debut as a goalkeeper for Queen's Park in 1939, when he was still attending school. After leaving school, Brown attended Jordanhill College with the intention of becoming a physical education teacher. He went on to establish himself as the first-choice goalkeeper for Queen's Park in the next two seasons, but like many others at this time, his football career was interrupted by the Second World War. Brown joined the Fleet Air Arm of the Royal Navy, and he initially trained to be a navigator on a Fairey Swordfish torpedo plane. He was then transferred to the Navy's physical training department, where he worked as an instructor. This posting allowed him to play as a guest in the wartime leagues for Portsmouth, Chester, Chelsea and Plymouth Argyle. Brown considered himself fortunate, as five of the six Jordanhill students who had joined the Fleet Air Arm with him died during the war. He continued his teaching studies at Portsmouth College. In his last season with Queen's Park, in 1945–46, he shared the goalkeeper's jersey with another future Scottish international Ronnie Simpson. It was Brown who was selected to play as the club won a rare trophy, the Glasgow Cup, during that campaign. Due to the wartime conditions he made no official Scottish Football League or Scottish Cup appearances in his time with the Spiders, but did play 105 times for the first team.

At the end of the 1945–46 season Brown left Queen's Park for Rangers, where he played for ten years. During his time at Ibrox he played on a part-time basis while working as a teacher. Brown won three Scottish league championships, three Scottish Cups and two Scottish League Cups, including a domestic treble in 1948–49. He played in 296 matches in the three major competitions for Rangers, including 179 in succession, and also won the wartime 1946 Victory Cup and another two Glasgow Cups. Brown's status as a part-time player subsequently caused difficulty with the Rangers manager Bill Struth, who wanted Brown to leave teaching and play football full-time. He was replaced by George Niven as first-choice goalkeeper in 1952, and only made a few appearances before leaving Rangers in 1956. Brown then moved to Falkirk, where he played for two years before he retired from playing.

=== International ===
Brown played in five wartime internationals for Scotland, with his first appearance coming at Villa Park in February 1945. His strong club form was rewarded with a full international call up and, in January 1946, he made his Scotland debut in a Victory International friendly against Belgium; this was the first of five full international appearances for Brown, who remains the last amateur player to earn a full cap for Scotland and also the last to do so while a Queen's Park player. He also appeared eight times for the Scottish League between 1949 and 1952 while with Rangers.

== Managerial career ==
After retiring as a player and leaving his teaching job in 1958, Brown became manager of St Johnstone. The Perth club had finished 11th in the old Second Division in the 1957–58 season. Brown guided them to 6th place in his first season, and then promotion as champions in 1960. Saints were relegated in 1962, but Brown stayed on as manager and won promotion back to the top division in 1963 before stabilising them as a top-division club, finishing in mid-table in the next few seasons. In total he managed 393 games for St Johnstone.

Brown became the first full-time Scotland manager in 1967. He was also the first manager to be given full authority to pick the team, which had previously been controlled by a Scottish Football Association committee. His first international match as manager was a 3–2 victory over the 1966 world champions England at Wembley, which led to Scots declaring themselves as "unofficial world champions". This game also saw Brown give his goalkeeping understudy from his Queen's Park days, Ronnie Simpson, his international debut at the age of 36. Brown continued as Scotland manager until 1971, but often found his squads depleted by club demands and results suffered accordingly. He won nine of 28 games played, and the team did not qualify for either the 1968 European Championships or the 1970 FIFA World Cup.

Brown's only active involvement in football after leaving the Scotland job was to scout for Plymouth Argyle.

== Later life ==
After finishing with Scotland in 1971 he turned to his business interests outside football. Brown and his wife Ruth settled in Helensburgh, where they ran a gift and coffee shop. Ruth died in 1983, aged 59, due to blood cancer. In 2017 Brown was retired and still lived in Helensburgh. He was inducted into the Rangers FC Hall of Fame and into the Scottish Football Hall of Fame in 2015. Brown was featured in Episode 4 A Better World of the BBC Two documentary Britain's Greatest Generation broadcast in May 2015.

Brown died of natural causes on 15 January 2020 at the age of 96. He was survived by three daughters, Carolyn, Alison and Gillian.

== Managerial statistics ==
As of 28 March 2015

Team	From	To	Record				
Team	From	To	G	W	D	L	Win %
St Johnstone	1958	1967	393	150	81	162	38.17
Scotland (Note: Includes five matches from the 1967 SFA tour (all wins) that were reclassified as full internationals in 2021.)	1967	1971	33	14	8	11	42.42
Total			426	164	89	173	38.50

== Honours ==
=== Manager ===
St Johnstone

- Scottish Division Two: 1959–60, 1962–63

Scotland

- British Home Championship: 1966–67
