= Ally MacLeod =

Scottish footballer and manager (1931–2004)

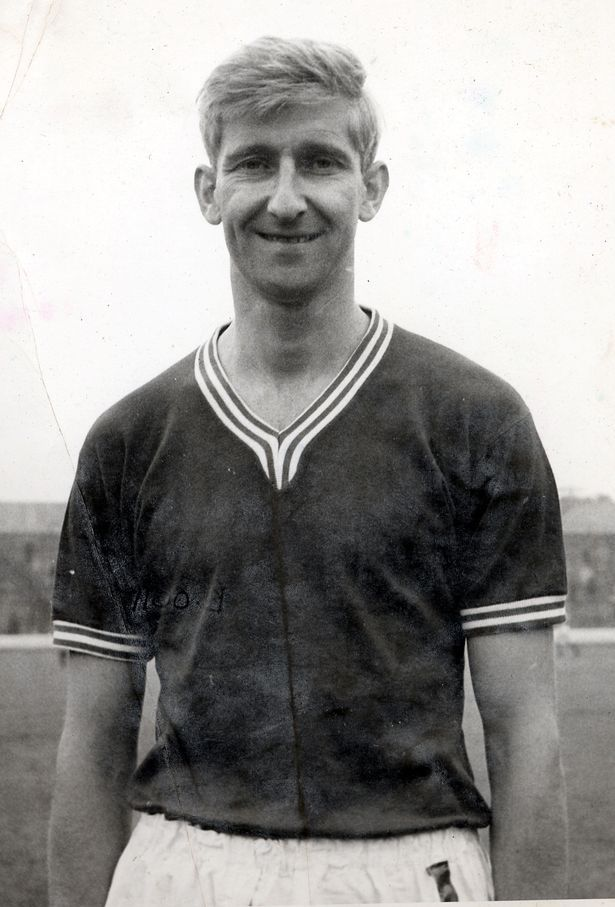
- MacLeod in 1949

Personal information
- Full name: Alistair Reid MacLeod
- Date of birth: 26 February 1931
- Place of birth: Glasgow, Scotland
- Date of death: 1 February 2004 (aged 72)
- Place of death: Ayr, Scotland
- Position: Left wing

Senior career*
Years	Team	Apps	(Gls)
1949–1955	Third Lanark	112	(17)
1955–1956	St Mirren	22	(3)
1956–1961	Blackburn Rovers	193	(47)
1961–1963	Hibernian	52	(6)
1963–1964	Third Lanark	24	(1)
1964–1965	Ayr United	17	(0)
Total		420	(80)

Managerial career
- 1966–1975: Ayr United
- 1975–1977: Aberdeen
- 1977–1978: Scotland
- 1978: Ayr United
- 1979–1981: Motherwell
- 1984–1985: Airdrieonians
- 1985–1990: Ayr United
- 1991–1992: Queen of the South
- * Club domestic league appearances and goals

Alistair Reid MacLeod (26 February 1931 – 1 February 2004) was a Scottish professional football player and manager. He is perhaps best known for his time as the Scotland national football team manager, including their appearance at the 1978 FIFA World Cup. MacLeod played as a left winger for Third Lanark (two spells), St Mirren, Blackburn Rovers, Hibernian and Ayr United. He then managed Ayr United (three spells), Aberdeen, Scotland, Motherwell, Airdrieonians and Queen of the South.

== Early years ==
Alistair Reid MacLeod was born in the south side of Glasgow on 26 February 1931. His family lived in Clydebank for a while but the house was bombed during the Second World War. At length they settled in Mount Florida, near to Hampden Park and Cathkin Park. MacLeod signed provisionally for Third Lanark when he was still a schoolboy. He made swift dashes up the left wing. His distinctive running action earned him the nickname "Noddy".

== Playing career ==
MacLeod started his playing career at Third Lanark as a provisional signing as a schoolboy in 1947. He made his first-team debut against Stirling Albion at Cathkin Park on 6 November 1949.

In 1953, MacLeod was in the Thirds side that trounced Alloa Athletic in the League Cup opener, 10–0. Sitting 8–0 up, MacLeod's teammates' main objective was to get him on the scoresheet. He had set up five goals but had missed several sitters himself. A left-foot rocket shot, and a simple tap in took Thirds' tally to 10. He joined the Royal Scots for National Service but was still able to turn out for the Thirds.

MacLeod was reluctant to move to St Mirren in 1956, but having secured a guarantee that the reported £8,000 fee would tremendously help Third Lanark's survival, he moved on. He spent only six weeks at St Mirren before moving to English team Blackburn Rovers.

Managed by fellow Scot Dally Duncan, MacLeod was man of the match in the 1960 FA Cup Final, but the game was lost 3–0 to Wolves. While at Blackburn he made strenuous efforts along with the PFA steward Jimmy Hill to help abolish the maximum wage, but when subsequently his promised wage increase was not forthcoming, while other players in the team were raised from £20 to £40 per week, he entered into discussions with Hibernian. When Blackburn realised that they were going to lose him to Hibs they improved their offer with an increase from £20 to £35. MacLeod, having already accepted Hibs' offer, felt he could not go back on his word, so left Blackburn to go back to Scotland.

He played with Hibs until 1963, when he returned to Third Lanark. In 1964 he signed for Ayr United, where he finished his playing career, with no major honours won.

== Coaching career ==
=== Ayr United ===
He started his managerial career in 1966 when he took charge of Ayr United. He took Ayr back to Scotland's top division and turned them into a well respected side. He took them to a Scottish and a League Cup semi-final and also set their attendance record with 25,225 watching a 2–1 success over Rangers F.C. In 1973, MacLeod was named Ayr's "Citizen of the Year".

=== Aberdeen ===
In November 1975, after nine years at Ayr, he moved to Aberdeen where he guided them to a League Cup final success over Celtic.

=== Scotland ===
==== 1978 World Cup qualification and preparation ====
After success with Ayr and Aberdeen, in May 1977 the Scottish Football Association appointed him manager of the Scotland national team. He introduced himself to the squad with the blunt statement: "My name is Ally MacLeod and I am a winner." In his first months in charge, Scotland beat England at Wembley and qualified for the 1978 World Cup from a group containing Czechoslovakia, who had won the 1976 European Championship, and Wales. Scotland's World Cup expectations gathered momentum with MacLeod happy with the wave of massive optimism, saying to the press his team would return with "at least a medal". Scottish comedian Andy Cameron recorded a version of "Ally's Tartan Army", which reached number 6 in the UK charts just before the World Cup.

Qualification was particularly sweet for Scotland since, for the second World Cup in succession, Scotland had achieved what their traditional rivals England had not. Defeat against England in the 1977–78 British Home Championship was taken to mean little. Spirits remained sky-high as 25,000 people came to Hampden Park to watch the squad circle the ground in an open-top bus prior to their departure for Argentina. Prestwick Airport was packed with supporters seeing the team off. When a journalist asked him "What do you plan to do after the World Cup?" MacLeod replied: "Retain it." This anecdote, though, is denied in some accounts of the Scottish saga at the 1978 World Cup and has been cited as one of the most popular hoaxes in British football.

==== 1978 World Cup finals ====
Some observers were worried by the absence through injury of full-back Danny McGrain. Opponents Peru's impressive credentials went overlooked and were not expected to provide many problems in the first match. Peru, however, won the game 3–1. Scotland took the lead but Don Masson missed a penalty and in general failed to play to their potential. Before the match journalist James McKillop had written in The Glasgow Herald that "The suggestion that we might not win is unthinkable and can be dismissed out of hand." As MacLeod himself put it, the performance against Peru was "rank bad". Plentiful excuses emerged: there had been a dispute concerning bonuses, the hotel swimming pool had no water in it, there was nothing for the players to do. It was then revealed that the winger Willie Johnston had taken a cold tablet which contained a banned stimulant fencamfamine (Reactivan). He was sent home. MacLeod, at a press conference, saw a mongrel dog approach: "I think he is the only friend I have got left", he said, stretching out a hand.

The game with Iran finished a 1–1 draw, after a poor display by the Scots. They then needed to beat the Netherlands, one of the tournament favourites, by three clear goals, to qualify. The next day's The Glasgow Herald ran the result of the Iran game as their main story under the headline "Ally's night of shame". Herald reporter James McKillop described the match as "Ally's Alamo" and said Scotland had "turned disgrace into humiliation". Adding that at full-time the Scotland players "were lucky not to be lynched", he said he had "never seen Scotland supporters more angry". McKillop's report also stated that in response to the result MacLeod offered "excuses, if not reasons", with MacLeod stated that "the team had been under tremendous pressure in Argentina".

For the Netherlands match MacLeod gave Graeme Souness his first game of the World Cup and was rewarded with a much-improved team performance. When Archie Gemmill scored what is widely thought to be one of the greatest World Cup goals ever (it was officially ranked seventh best by FIFA), to make the score 3–1 to Scotland, qualification to the next phase looked possible. Three minutes later, though, the Dutch pulled a goal back; the game ended 3–2 and Scotland were eliminated on goal difference. The Netherlands proceeded to the final, where they lost to Argentina.

==== Aftermath and resignation ====
Following the squads return to Scotland, Macleod's future was discussed by the SFA's International Committee at a meeting in July to consider the team's failure in Argentina. Macleod was present at this four and half hour meeting where a motion to remove him was proposed. The six-man committee agreed to keep Macleod in place as the motion was defeated, but The Glasgow Herald reported that it was understood that the motion for dismissal had only been defeated on the casting vote of the Committee's chairman, Tom Laughlan of Kilmarnock F.C. An editorial in the same newspaper noted that "the football public expected more from Mr MacLeod in the Scotland job than he was able to deliver. He emerges from a chastening experience a wiser man."

Although MacLeod had survived this immediate inquest by the sport's authorities, he resigned after one more game in charge, only 17 matches and about 500 days after his appointment. His old club Ayr United had been given permission by the Scottish Football Association to talk to MacLeod about him returning as Ayr manager. MacLeod accepted the offer although Ayr were in the second tier and the job was thought to pay around £12,000 per year, £3,000 less than he received as Scotland manager. MacLeod admitted that the World Cup failure, and the fallout which followed it, "had taken a lot out of him", but said he was now relaxed and wanted "to prove myself again." His decision to resign and return to club management echoed that of his predecessor in the Scotland job, Willie Ormond. MacLeod's departure left Scotland needing to quickly appoint a manager ahead of their next UEFA Euro 1980 qualifying match against Norway. The Glasgow Herald sports reporter Jim Reynolds dismissed the idea that MacLeod might be asked to stay on in a part-time basis until after this match, saying that "Too many people inside Park Gardens", which was the SFA's headquarters, would "breath a sigh of relief" at MacLeod's departure.

The Scottish Football Association's annual report, issued in May 1979, stated that, "regardless of the depressing aspects of Mr MacLeod's latter days in the Association's employ, it would be quite unfair not to comment that he was largely responsible for kindling an enthusiasm for the Scottish team that far exceeded anything which had gone before. The Association benefited considerably from that enthusiasm and should not forget it".

In his autobiography, The Ally MacLeod Story (1979), he wondered whether he had "generated just too much excitement. Had I raised the level of national optimism just too high?" But he was able to console himself: "Would the Scottish fans have tolerated anything less from me than whole-hearted conviction?" MacLeod also reassured the reader that he, for one, never thought that Scotland were invincible, and claimed to be perfectly at peace with himself. "I am a very good manager who just happened to have a few disastrous days, once upon a time, in Argentina."

=== Later career ===
His subsequent managerial career included spells at Motherwell (1979–1981), Airdrie (1984–1985) and a third spell at Ayr (1986–1989) when he won a Second Division (third tier) title in 1988. His last job in football was with Dumfries club Queen of the South. In 1992, he played in a game for Queens' reserve team, scoring a goal from a penalty at the age of 61.

== Death and tributes ==
Increasingly treated with affection by the Scottish footballing public, in July 2003, at Hampden Park, he was presented with a crystal decanter in appreciation of his services to the national team and to Scottish football.

He died in 2004, aged 72, after a long battle with Alzheimer's disease. MacLeod was posthumously inducted to the Scottish Football Hall of Fame in 2015.

== Honours ==
Third Lanark

- Glasgow Charity Cup: 1955–56

Hibernian

- East of Scotland Shield: 1960–61

Blackburn Rovers

- Football League Second Division promotion: 1957–58
- FA Cup runner-up: 1959–60

=== Manager ===
Ayr United

- Scottish Division Two: 1965–66
- Scottish Division Two promotion: 1968–69
- Scottish Second Division: 1987–88
- Ayrshire Cup: 1969; 1970; 1971; 1975; 1988

Aberdeen

- Scottish League Cup: 1976–77

Scotland

- British Home Championship: 1976–77

Motherwell

- Lanarkshire Cup: 1981

Airdrieonians

- Lanarkshire Cup winners: 1984

=== Managerial statistics ===
Team	Nat	From	To	Record				
Team	Nat	From	To	G	W	D	L	Win %
Scotland	(Scotland)	1977	1978	17	7	5	5	41.18
