= Scotland national football team =

Men's association football team

Scotland
- Nickname: The Tartan Army (supporters)
- Association: Scottish Football Association (SFA)
- Confederation: UEFA (Europe)
- Head coach: Sébastien Pocognoli
- Captain: Andy Robertson
- Most caps: Andy Robertson (103)
- Top scorer: Kenny Dalglish; Denis Law (30)
- Home stadium: Hampden Park
- FIFA code: SCO
First colours	Second colours

FIFA ranking
- Current: 44 ▼1 (18 November 2026)
- Highest: 13 (October 2007)
- Lowest: 88 (March 2005)

First international
- Scotland 0–0 England (Partick, Scotland; 30 November 1872) (The first ever international football match)

Biggest win
- Scotland 11–0 Ireland (Glasgow, Scotland; 23 February 1901)

Biggest defeat
- Uruguay 7–0 Scotland (Basel, Switzerland; 19 June 1954)

World Cup
- Appearances: 9 (first in 1954)
- Best result: Group stage (1954, 1958, 1974, 1978, 1982, 1986, 1990, 1998, 2026)

European Championship
- Appearances: 4 (first in 1992)
- Best result: Group stage (1992, 1996, 2020, 2024)
- Website: scottishfa.co.uk

The Scotland national football team (Note: Scottish Gaelic: Sgioba Ball-coise Nàiseanta na h-Alba Scots: Scotland naitional fitbaw team) represents Scotland in men's international football and is controlled by the Scottish Football Association. They compete in three major professional tournaments: the FIFA World Cup, UEFA Nations League, and the UEFA European Championship. Scotland, as a country of the United Kingdom, are not a member of the International Olympic Committee (as Scottish athletes compete for Great Britain), and therefore the national team does not compete in the Olympic Games. The majority of Scotland's home matches are played at the national stadium, Hampden Park.

Scotland are the joint oldest national football team in the world, alongside England, whom they played in the world's first international football match in 1872. Scotland has a long-standing rivalry with England, whom they played annually from 1872 until 1989. The teams have met only nine times since then, most recently in a friendly in September 2023.

Scotland have qualified for the FIFA World Cup on nine occasions, and the UEFA European Championship four times, but they have never progressed beyond the first round of a finals tournament. The team have achieved some noteworthy results, such as beating the 1966 FIFA World Cup winners England 3–2 at Wembley Stadium in 1967. Archie Gemmill scored what has been described as one of the greatest World Cup goals ever in a 3–2 win during the 1978 World Cup against the Netherlands, who reached the final of the tournament. In their qualifying group for UEFA Euro 2008, Scotland defeated 2006 World Cup runners-up France 1–0 in both fixtures.

Scotland supporters are collectively known as the Tartan Army. The Scottish Football Association operates a roll of honour for every player who has made more than 50 appearances for Scotland. Kenny Dalglish and Andy Robertson hold the record for Scotland appearances, having played 102 times. Dalglish scored 30 goals for Scotland and shares the record for most goals scored with Denis Law.

== History ==
=== Early history ===
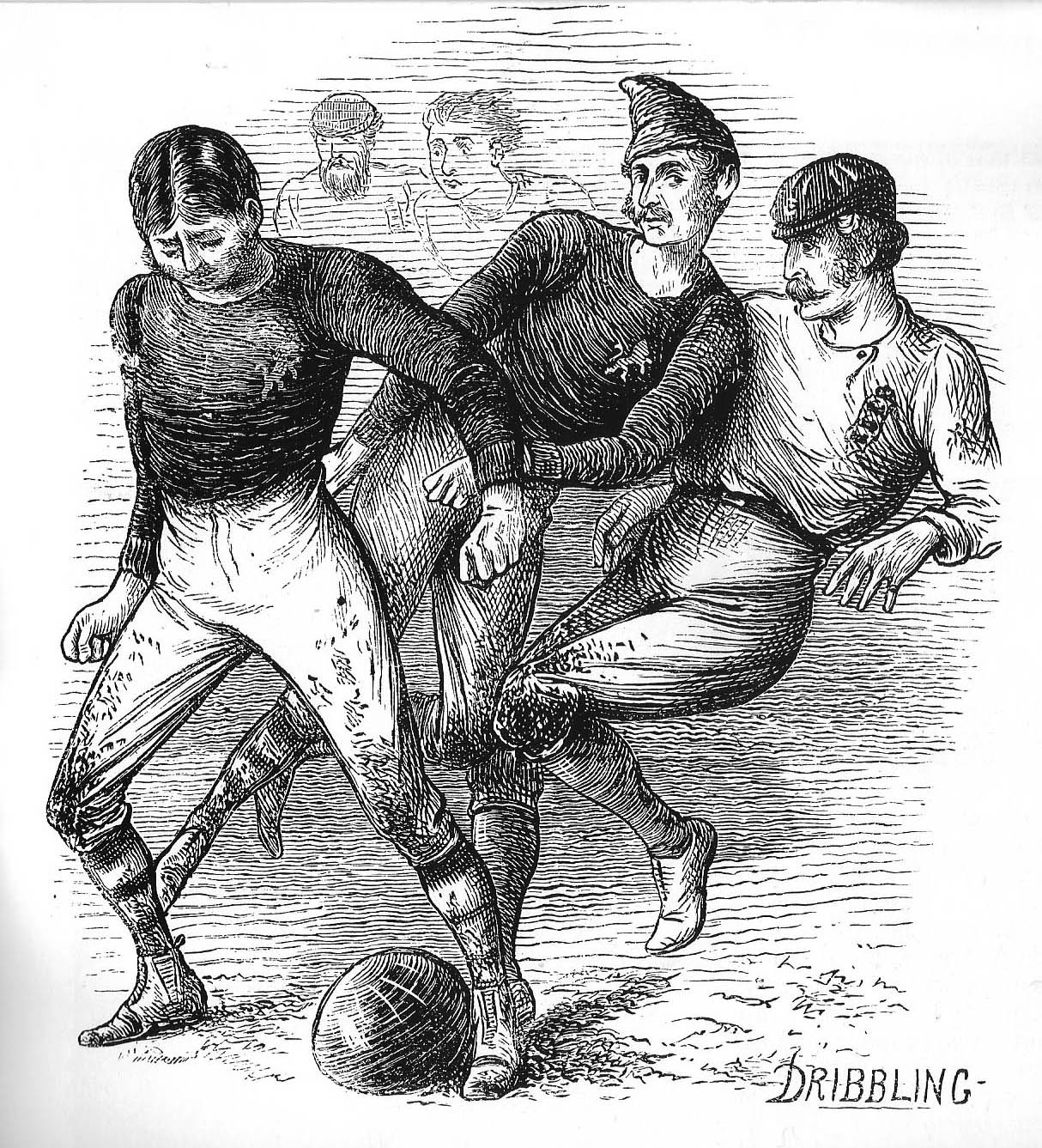
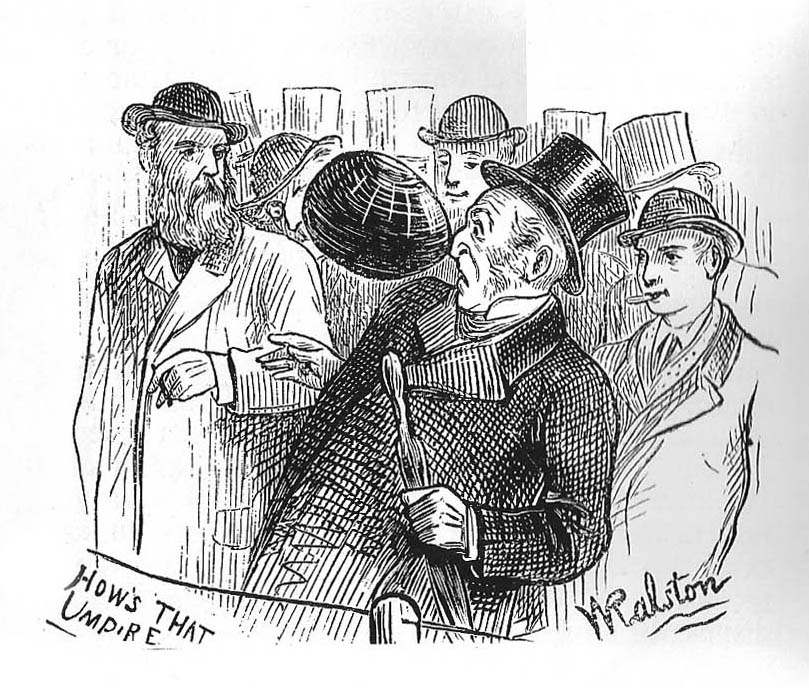
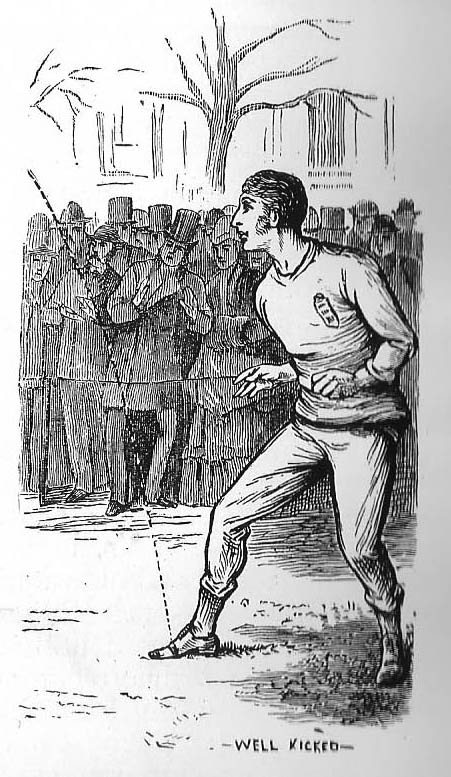
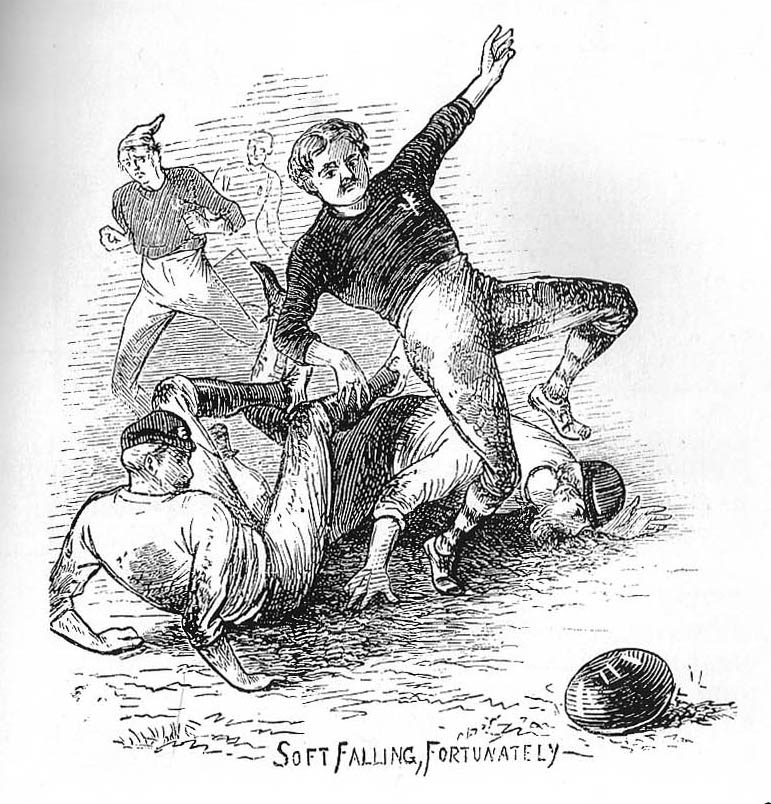
Illustrations of the first international football match, hosted by Scotland against England in 1872

Scotland and England are the oldest national football teams in the world. Teams representing the two sides first competed at the Oval in five matches between 1870 and 1872. The two countries contested the first official international football match, at Hamilton Crescent in Partick, Scotland, on 30 November 1872. The match ended in a goalless draw. All eleven players who represented Scotland that day played for Glasgow amateur club Queen's Park. Over the next forty years, Scotland played matches exclusively against the other three Home Nations—England, Wales and Ireland. The British Home Championship began in 1883, making these games competitive. The encounters against England were particularly fierce and a rivalry quickly developed.

Scotland lost just two of their first 43 international matches. It was not until a 2–0 home defeat by Ireland in 1903 that Scotland lost a match to a team other than England. This run of success meant that Scotland would have regularly topped the Elo ratings, which were calculated in 1998, between 1876 and 1904. Scotland won the British Home Championship outright on 24 occasions, and shared the title 17 times with at least one other team. (Note: The competition used neither goal difference nor goal average to separate teams level on points, so the title was shared instead.) A noteworthy victory for Scotland before the Second World War was the 5–1 victory over England in 1928, which led to that Scotland side being known as the "Wembley Wizards". Scotland played their first match outside the British Isles in 1929, beating Norway 7–3 in Bergen. Scotland continued to contest regular friendly matches against European opposition and enjoyed wins against Germany and France before losing to the Austrian "Wunderteam" and Italy in 1931.

Scotland, like the other Home Nations, did not enter the three FIFA World Cups held during the 1930s. This was because the four associations had been excluded from FIFA due to a disagreement regarding the status of amateur players. The four associations, including Scotland, returned to the FIFA fold after the Second World War. A match between a United Kingdom team and a "Rest of the World" team was played at Hampden Park in 1947 to celebrate this reconciliation.

=== 1950s: Entering the World Cup ===
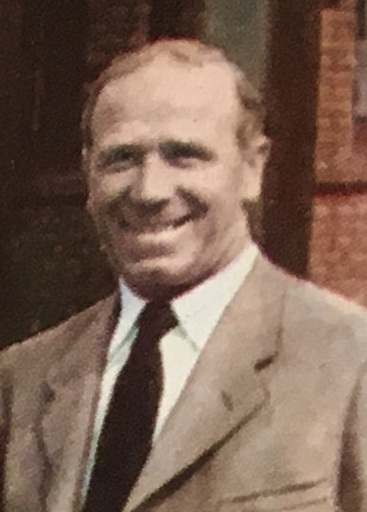
Matt Busby was due to manage Scotland at the 1958 FIFA World Cup, but was unable due to his injuries from the Munich air disaster.

The readmission of the Scottish Football Association to FIFA meant that Scotland were eligible to enter the 1950 FIFA World Cup. FIFA advised that places would be awarded to the top two teams in the British Home Championship, but the SFA announced that Scotland would only attend the finals if Scotland won that competition. Scotland won their first two matches, but a 1–0 home defeat by England meant that the Scots finished as runners-up. Scotland had qualified by right for the World Cup, but had not met the demand of the SFA to win the Championship. The SFA stood by this proclamation, despite pleas to the contrary by the Scotland players, supported by England captain Billy Wright and the other England players. The SFA instead sent the team on a tour of North America.

The same qualification rules were in place for the 1954 FIFA World Cup, and Scotland finished second in the British Home Championship. This time the SFA allowed the team to participate in the World Cup, but its "preparation was atrocious". The SFA only sent 13 players to the finals, even though FIFA allowed 22-man squads. Despite this self-imposed hardship in terms of players, SFA dignitaries travelled in numbers, accompanied by their wives. Scotland lost 1–0 against Austria in their first game in the finals, which prompted the team manager Andy Beattie to resign hours before the game against Uruguay. Uruguay were reigning champions and had never before lost a game at the World Cup finals, and they defeated Scotland 7–0.

The 1958 FIFA World Cup finals saw Scotland draw their first game against Yugoslavia 1–1, but they then lost to Paraguay and France and went out at the first stage. Matt Busby had been due to manage the team at the World Cup, but the severe injuries he suffered in the Munich air disaster meant that trainer Dawson Walker took charge of the team instead.

=== 1960s: Ian McColl and Home Championship successes ===
Under the management of Ian McColl, Scotland enjoyed consecutive British Home Championship successes in 1962 and 1963. Jock Stein, John Prentice and Malky MacDonald all had brief spells as manager before Bobby Brown was appointed in 1967. Brown's first match as manager was against the newly crowned world champions England at Wembley Stadium. Despite being underdogs, Scotland won 3–2 thanks to goals from Denis Law, Bobby Lennox and Jim McCalliog. Having defeated the world champions on their own turf, the Scotland fans hailed their team as the "unofficial world champions". Despite this famous win, the Scots failed to qualify for any major competitions during the 1960s.

=== 1970s: World Cups and Ally MacLeod ===
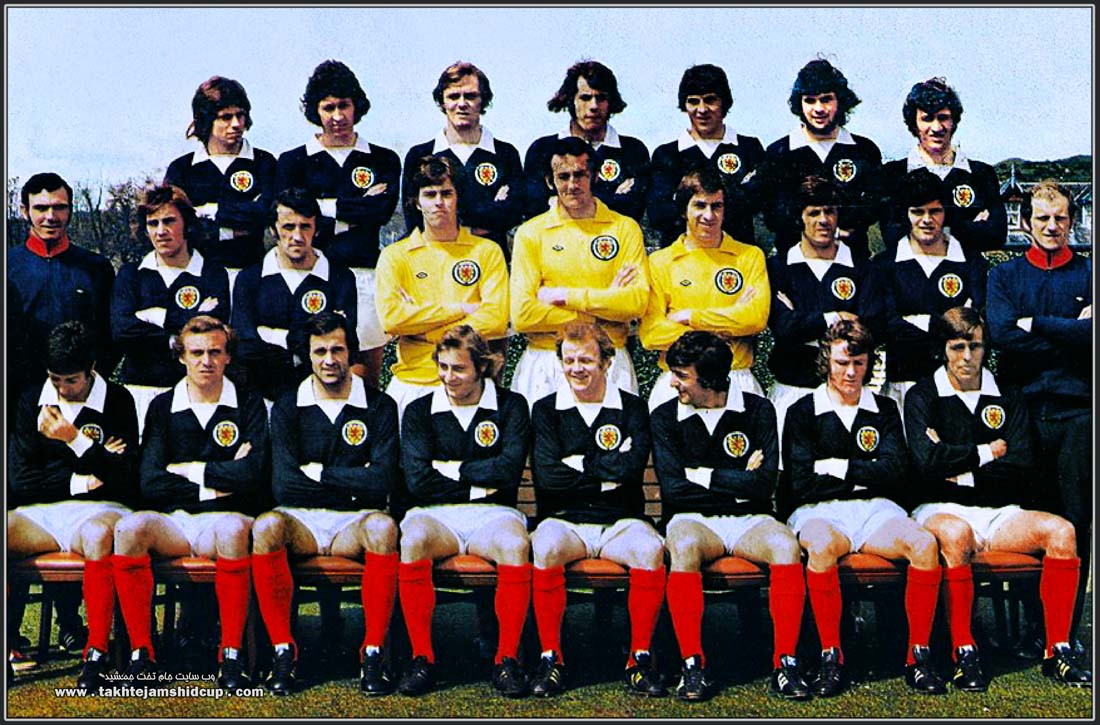
The national football team of Scotland in 1972

After Tommy Docherty's brief spell as manager, Willie Ormond was hired in 1973. Ormond lost his first match in charge 5–0 to England, but recovered to steer Scotland to their first World Cup finals in 16 years in 1974. At the 1974 World Cup finals in West Germany, Scotland achieved their most impressive performance at a World Cup tournament. The team was unbeaten but failed to progress beyond the group stages on goal difference. After beating Zaïre, they drew with both Brazil and Yugoslavia, and went out because they had beaten Zaïre by the smallest margin.

Scotland appointed Ally MacLeod as manager in 1977, with qualification for the 1978 World Cup in Argentina far from assured. The team made a strong start under MacLeod by winning the 1977 British Home Championship, largely thanks to a 2–1 victory over England at Wembley. The Scotland fans invaded the pitch after the match, ripping up the turf and breaking a crossbar. Scotland's form continued as they secured qualification for the World Cup with victories over Czechoslovakia and Wales.

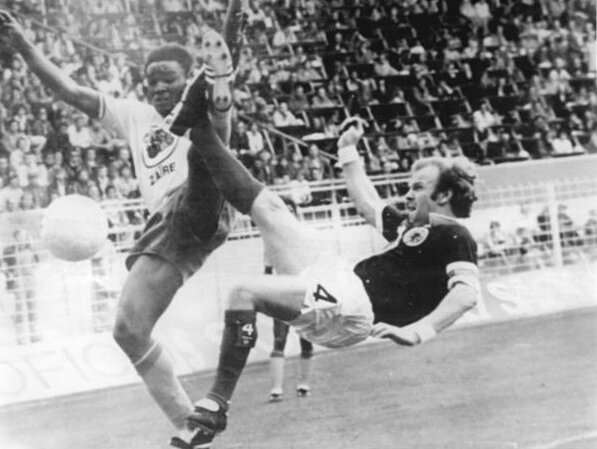
Billy Bremner (right) playing for Scotland against Zaire at the Westfalenstadion in the 1974 FIFA World Cup

During the build-up to the 1978 FIFA World Cup, MacLeod fuelled the hopes of the nation by stating that Scotland would come home with a medal. As the squad left for the finals in Argentina, they were given an enthusiastic send-off as they were paraded around a packed Hampden Park. Thousands more fans lined the route to Prestwick Airport as the team set off for South America. Scotland lost their first game 3–1 against Peru in Córdoba, and drew the second 1–1 against newcomers Iran. The disconsolate mood of the nation was reflected by footage of MacLeod in the dugout with his head in his hands. These results meant Scotland had to defeat the Netherlands by three clear goals to progress. Despite the Dutch taking the lead, Scotland fought back to win 3–2 with a goal from Kenny Dalglish and two from Archie Gemmill, the second of which is considered one of the greatest World Cup goals ever; Gemmill beat three Dutch defenders before lifting the ball over goalkeeper Jan Jongbloed into the net. The victory was not sufficient to secure a place in the second round, and Scotland were eliminated on goal difference for the second successive World Cup.

=== 1980s: Jock Stein and Alex Ferguson ===
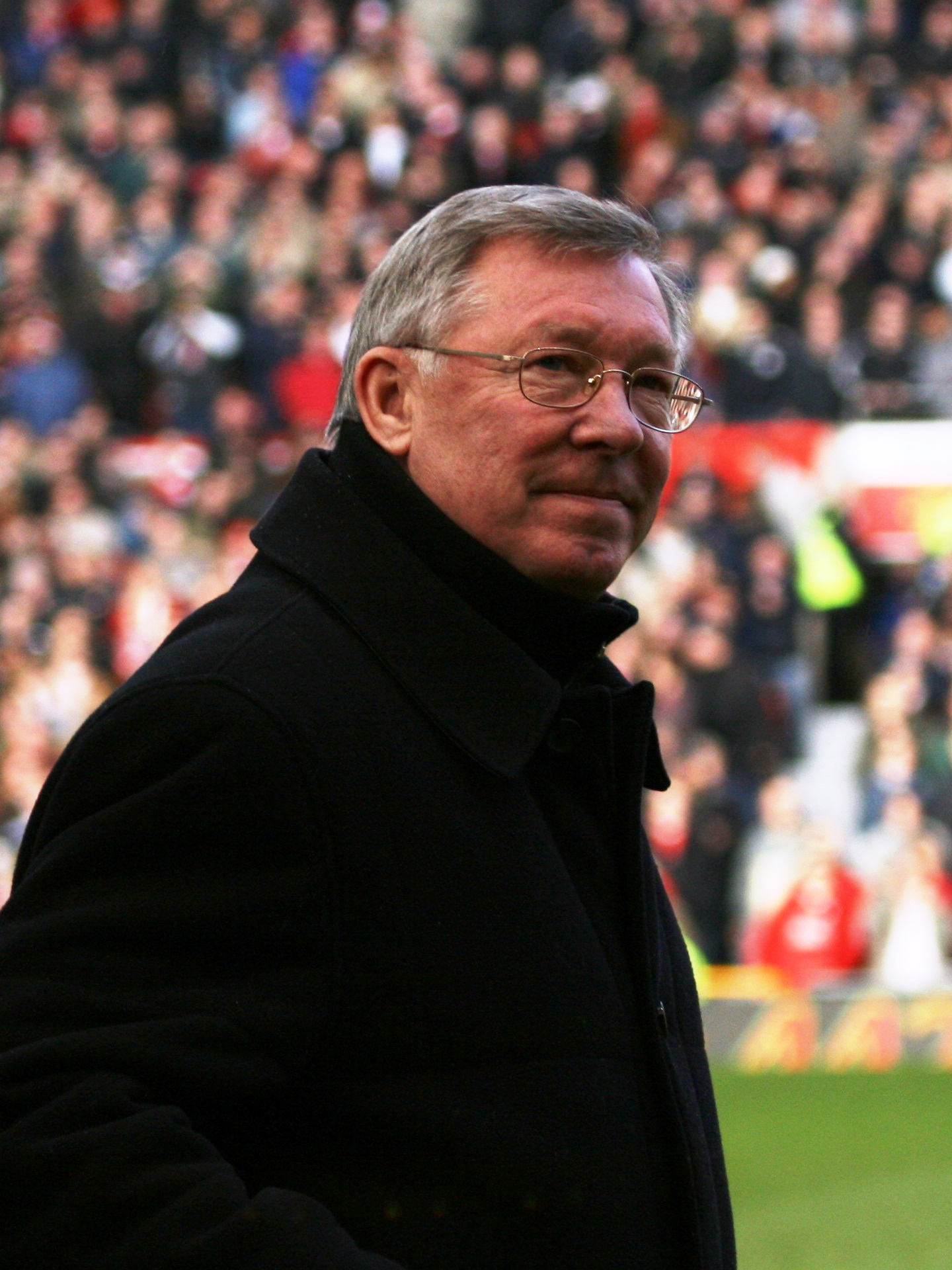
Alex Ferguson (pictured) briefly served as Scotland's manager after the sudden death of Jock Stein in 1985.

MacLeod resigned as manager shortly after the 1978 World Cup, and Jock Stein, who had won nine consecutive Scottish league titles and the European Cup as manager of Celtic, was appointed as his successor. After failing to qualify for the 1980 European Championship, Scotland qualified for the 1982 FIFA World Cup from a tough group including Sweden, Portugal, Israel and Northern Ireland, losing just one match in the process. They beat New Zealand 5–2 in their first game at the World Cup, but lost 4–1 to a Brazil team containing Sócrates, Zico, Eder and Falcão. Scotland were again eliminated on goal difference, after a 2–2 draw with the Soviet Union.

Scotland qualified for the 1986 FIFA World Cup, their fourth in succession, in traumatic circumstances. The squad went into their last qualification match against Wales needing a point to progress to a qualifying playoff against Australia. With only nine minutes remaining and Wales leading 1–0, Scotland were awarded a penalty kick, which was calmly scored by Davie Cooper. The 1–1 draw meant that Scotland progressed, but as the players and fans celebrated, Stein suffered a heart attack and died shortly afterwards. His assistant Alex Ferguson took over. Scotland qualified by winning 2–0 against Australia in a two-leg playoff, but were eliminated from the tournament with just one point from their three matches, a goalless draw with Uruguay following defeats by Denmark and West Germany.

In July 1986, Andy Roxburgh was the surprise appointment as the new manager of Scotland. Scotland did not succeed in qualifying for Euro 1988, but their 1–0 away win over Bulgaria in the final fixture in November 1987 helped Ireland to a surprise first-place finish and qualification for the finals in West Germany.

=== 1990s: Four major tournament appearances ===
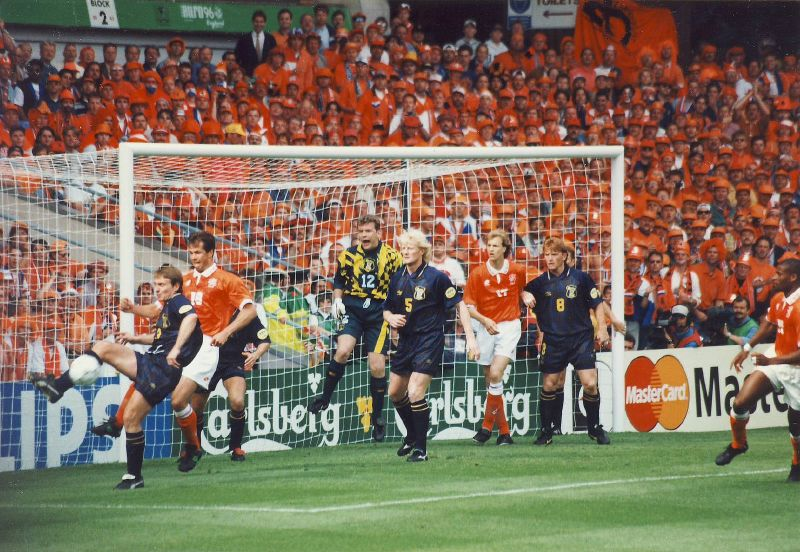
Scotland against the Netherlands at Villa Park during Euro 1996

Scotland qualified for their fifth consecutive World Cup in 1990 by finishing second in their qualifying group, ahead of France. Scotland were drawn in a group with Costa Rica, Sweden, and Brazil, but the Scots lost 1–0 to Costa Rica. While they recovered to beat Sweden 2–1 in their second game, they lost to Brazil in their third match 1–0 and were again eliminated after the first round.

By a narrow margin, Scotland qualified for the UEFA European Championship for the first time in 1992. A 1–0 defeat by Romania away from home left qualification dependent upon other results, but a 1–1 draw between Bulgaria and Romania in the final group match saw Scotland squeeze through. Despite playing well in matches against the Netherlands and Germany and a fine win against the CIS, the team was knocked out at the group stage. Scotland failed to qualify for the 1994 FIFA World Cup. The team finished fourth in their qualifying group behind Italy, Switzerland and Portugal. When it became clear that Scotland could not qualify, Andy Roxburgh resigned from his position as team manager.

New manager Craig Brown successfully guided Scotland to the 1996 European Championship tournament. The first game against the Netherlands ended 0–0, raising morale ahead of a much anticipated game against England at Wembley. Gary McAllister missed a penalty kick, and a goal by Paul Gascoigne led to a 2–0 defeat. Scotland recovered to beat Switzerland 1–0 with a goal by Ally McCoist. England taking a 4–0 lead in the other match briefly put Scotland in a position to qualify, but a late goal for the Netherlands meant that they advanced instead of Scotland on goals scored.

Brown again guided Scotland to qualification for a major tournament in 1998, and Scotland were drawn against Brazil in the opening game of the 1998 World Cup. John Collins equalised from the penalty spot to level the score at 1–1, but a Tom Boyd own goal led to a 2–1 defeat. Scotland drew their next game 1–1 with Norway in Bordeaux, but the final match against Morocco ended in an embarrassing 3–0 defeat.

During the qualification for the 2000 European Championship, Scotland faced England in a two-legged playoff nicknamed the "Battle of Britain" by the media. Scotland won the second match 1–0 with a goal by Don Hutchison, but lost the tie 2–1 on aggregate.

=== 2000s: First foreign manager and 2008 near miss ===
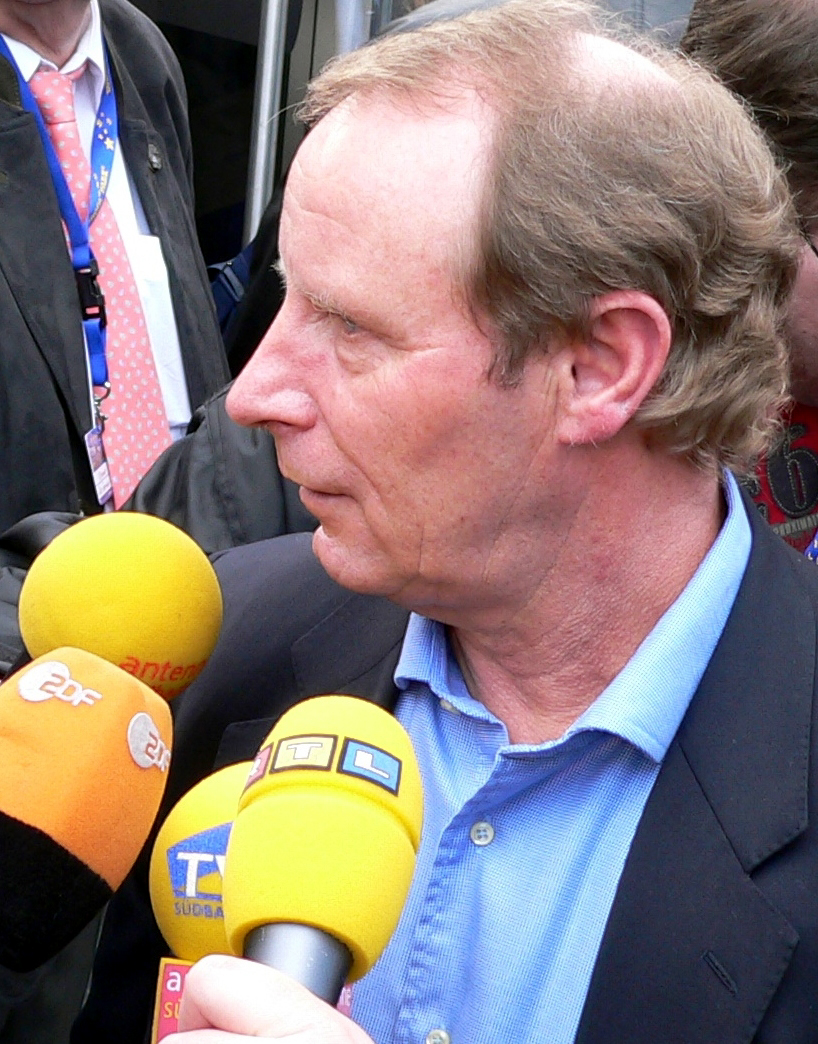
Berti Vogts, the first foreigner to coach Scotland

Scotland failed to qualify for the 2002 FIFA World Cup, finishing third in their qualifying group behind Croatia and Belgium. This second successive failure to qualify prompted Craig Brown to resign from his position after the final qualifying match. The SFA appointed former Germany manager Berti Vogts as Brown's successor. Scotland reached the qualification play-offs for Euro 2004, where they beat the Netherlands 1–0 at Hampden Park, but suffered a 6–0 defeat in the return leg. Poor results in friendly matches and a bad start to the 2006 World Cup qualification caused the team to drop to a record low of 77th in the FIFA World Rankings. Vogts announced his resignation in 2004, blaming the hostile media for his departure.

Walter Smith, a former Rangers and Everton manager, was brought in to replace Vogts. Improved results meant that Scotland rose up the FIFA rankings and won the Kirin Cup, a friendly competition in Japan. Scotland failed to qualify for the 2006 FIFA World Cup, finishing third in their group behind Italy and Norway. Smith left the national side in January 2007 to return to Rangers, with Scotland leading their Euro 2008 qualification group. New manager Alex McLeish guided Scotland to wins against Georgia, the Faroe Islands, Lithuania, France and Ukraine, but defeats by Georgia and Italy ended their chances of qualification for Euro 2008. These improved results, particularly the wins against France, lifted Scotland into the top 20 of the FIFA world rankings.

After the narrow failure to qualify for Euro 2008, McLeish left to join Premier League club Birmingham City. Southampton manager George Burley was hired as the new manager, but he came in for criticism from the media after the team lost their first qualifier against Macedonia. After Scotland lost their fourth match 3–0 to the Netherlands, captain Barry Ferguson and goalkeeper Allan McGregor were excluded from the starting lineup for the following match against Iceland due to a "breach of discipline". Despite winning 2–1 against Iceland, Scotland suffered a 4–0 defeat by Norway in the following qualifier, which left Scotland effectively needing to win their last two games to have a realistic chance of making the qualifying play-offs. Scotland defeated Macedonia 2–0 in the first of those two games, but were eliminated by a 1–0 loss to the Netherlands in the second game. Burley was allowed to continue in his post after a review by the SFA board, but a subsequent 3–0 friendly defeat by Wales led to his dismissal.

=== 2010s: Failures to qualify ===
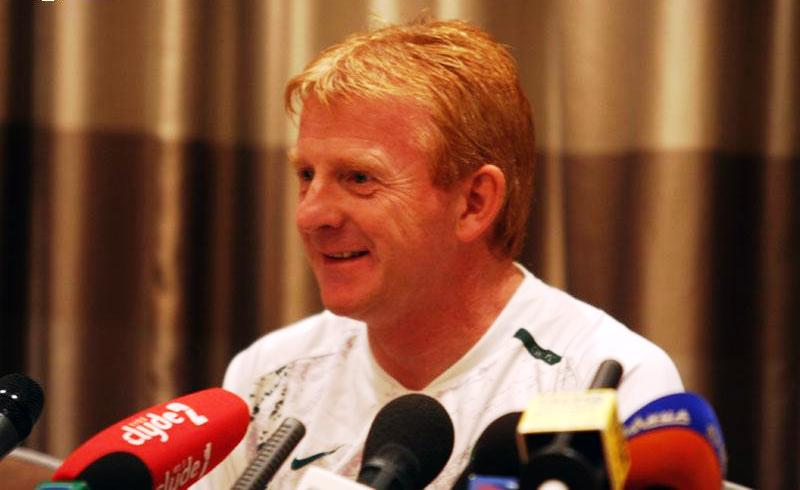
Gordon Strachan was appointed Scotland manager in January 2013.

The SFA appointed Craig Levein as head coach of the national team in December 2009. In UEFA Euro 2012 qualifying, Scotland were grouped with Lithuania, Liechtenstein, the Czech Republic and world champions Spain. They took just four points from the first four games, leaving the team needing three wins from their remaining four games to have a realistic chance of progression. They only managed two wins and a draw and were eliminated after a 3–1 defeat by Spain in their last match. Levein left his position as head coach following a poor start to 2014 FIFA World Cup qualification, having taken just two points from four games.

Gordon Strachan was appointed Scotland manager in January 2013, but defeats in his first two competitive matches meant that Scotland were the first UEFA team to be eliminated from the 2014 World Cup qualification. Scotland finished their qualification section by winning three of their last four matches, including two victories against Croatia.

UEFA Euro 2016 expanded from 16 teams to 24. After losing their first qualifier in Germany, Scotland recorded home wins against Georgia, the Republic of Ireland and Gibraltar. Steven Fletcher scored the first hat-trick for Scotland since 1969 in the game with Gibraltar. Later in the group, Scotland produced an "insipid" performance as they lost 1–0 in Georgia. A home defeat by Germany and a late equalising goal by Poland eliminated Scotland from contention. After a win against Gibraltar in the last qualifier, Strachan agreed a new contract with the SFA.

In qualification for the 2018 FIFA World Cup, Scotland were drawn in the same group as England, facing their rivals in a competitive fixture for the first time since 1999. On 11 November 2016, England beat Scotland 3–0 at Wembley. The return match saw Leigh Griffiths score two late free-kicks to give Scotland a 2–1 lead, but Harry Kane scored in added time to force a 2–2 draw. A draw in Slovenia in the final game of the group ended Scottish hopes of a play-off position, and Strachan subsequently left his position by mutual consent. In February 2018, Alex McLeish was appointed manager for the second time. The team won their group in the 2018–19 UEFA Nations League, but McLeish left in April 2019 after a poor start to UEFA Euro 2020 qualifying, including a 3–0 loss to 117th-ranked Kazakhstan.

=== 2020s: Steve Clarke and three tournament qualifications ===
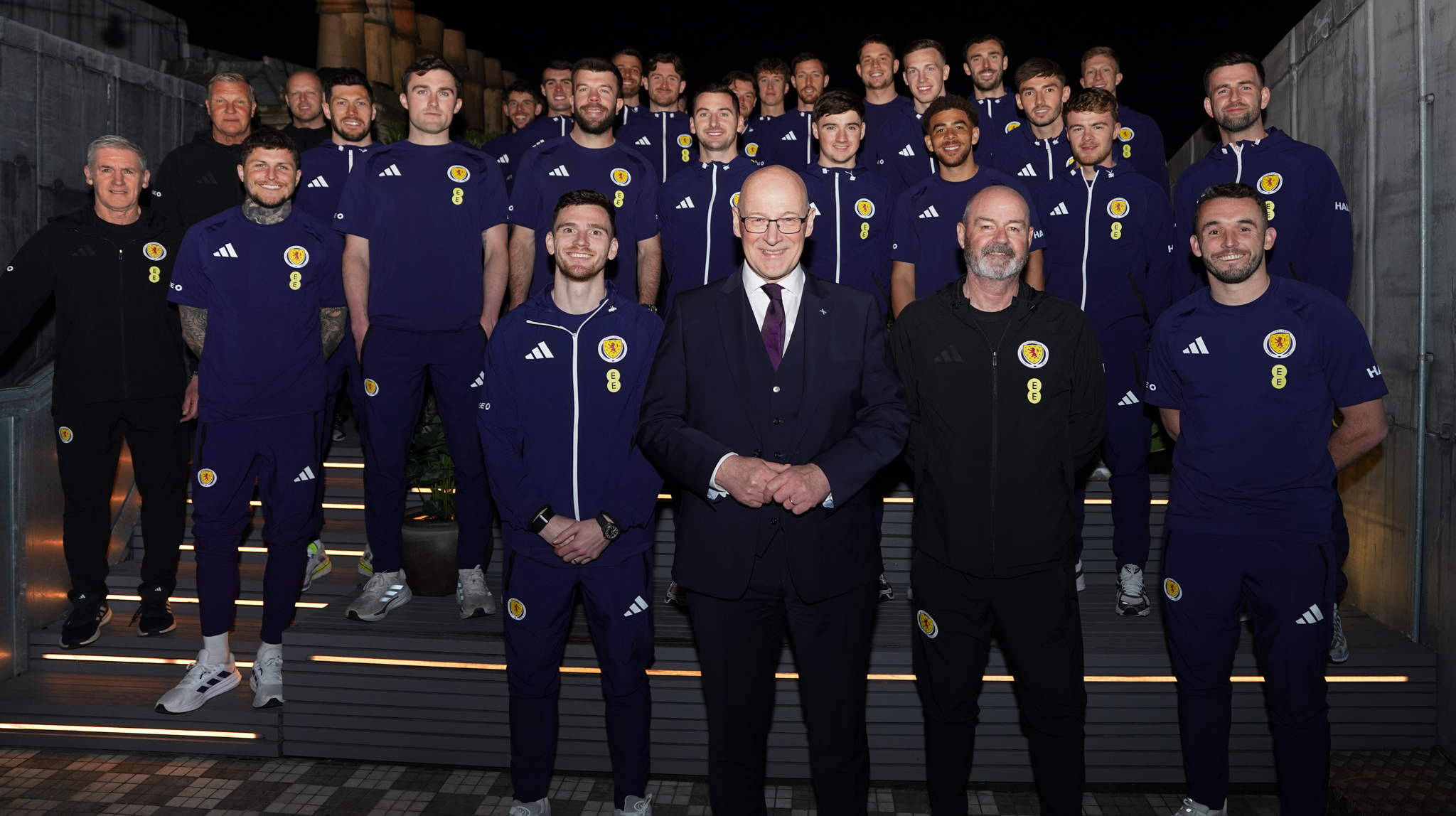
Scotland squad meet with First Minister John Swinney ahead of the 2026 World Cup

==== UEFA Euro 2020 and 2022 FIFA World Cup qualification ====
Steve Clarke was appointed Scotland manager in May 2019. The team failed to qualify automatically for UEFA Euro 2020, but consecutive victories in penalty shootouts in the playoffs against Israel and Serbia put Scotland into their first major tournament since 1998. Defeats by the Czech Republic and Croatia, either side of a goalless draw with England, meant that Scotland finished bottom of Group D.

Six consecutive wins later that year meant that Scotland finished second in Group F of 2022 FIFA World Cup qualification. This progressed the team into the play-offs, where they were paired with Ukraine in a semi-final at Hampden; Scotland lost 3–1. Later that year, Scotland won their Nations League group and promotion to League A.

==== UEFA Euro 2024 ====
The Scots began their UEFA Euro 2024 qualifying campaign with five wins out of five, including a famous 2–0 victory over Spain at Hampden. Despite losing their sixth match, the return game against Spain, they qualified for Euro 2024 with two matches to spare after Norway lost 1–0 to Spain. This meant they qualified through a qualifying group to reach a major tournament for the first time since 1998. Scotland was drawn to face Germany, Switzerland and Hungary in Group A. They were defeated 5–1 by the Germans in the opening match, drew 1–1 with the Swiss and lost 1–0 to Hungary to once again finish bottom of the group. It was estimated that around 200,000 Scotland fans travelled to Euro 2024.

==== 2026 FIFA World Cup ====
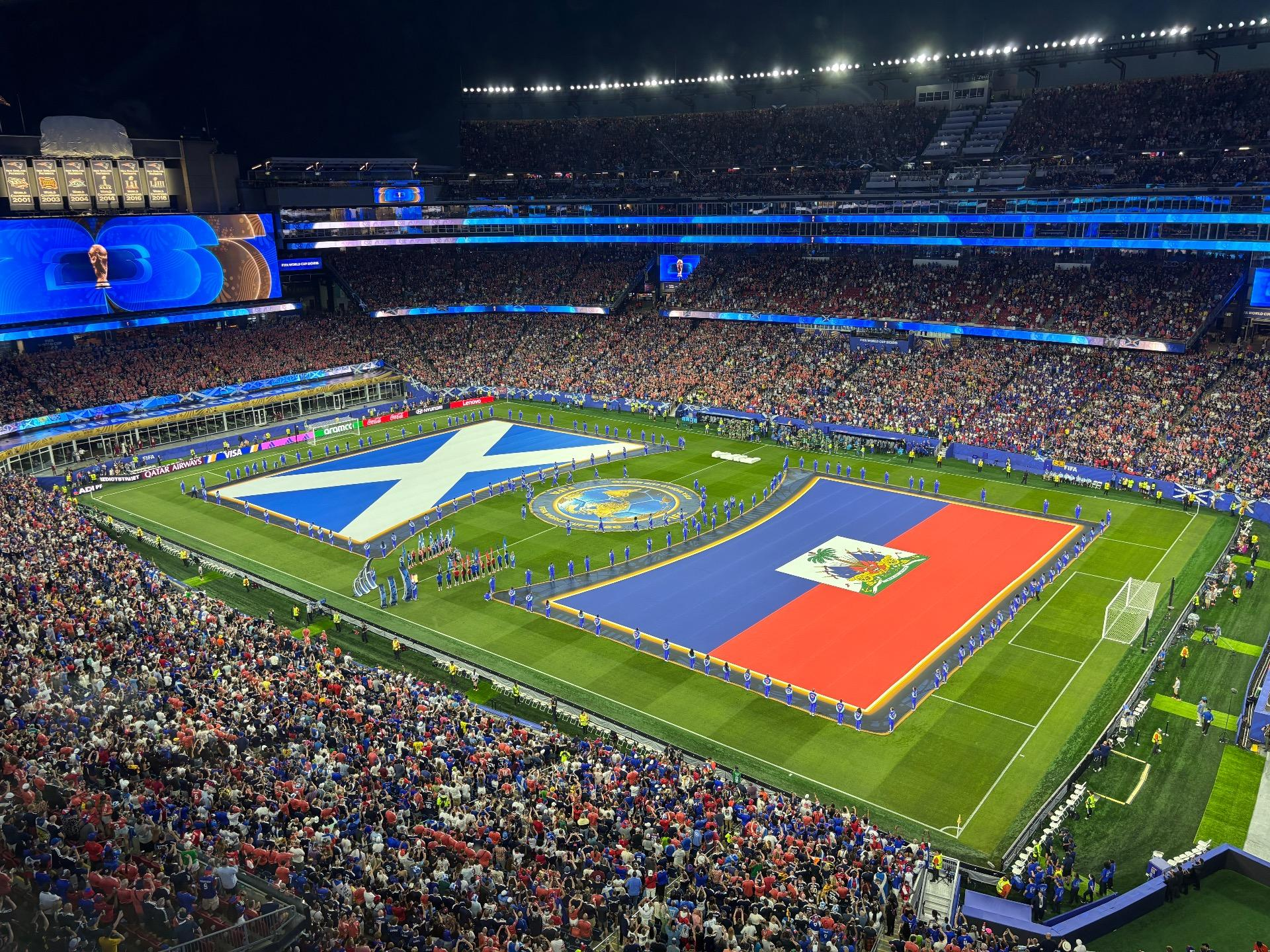
The build-up to Haiti vs Scotland at Boston Stadium, 12 June 2026

In their 2026 World Cup qualification group, Scotland drew 0–0 with Denmark away; triumphed over Belarus twice; and beat Greece 3–1 at home while losing 3–2 away. On 18 November 2025, they beat Denmark 4–2 at home in the last match of the section to qualify for their ninth World Cup finals, and their first since 1998.

In December 2025, Scotland were drawn in Group C of the 2026 FIFA World Cup alongside Haiti, Morocco and Brazil. In their first game against Haiti, Scotland triumphed 1–0 with a goal in the 28th minute from John McGinn. This marked their first win at a World Cup since a victory over Sweden at the 1990 iteration and their first major tournament victory since a 1-0 win over Switzerland at UEFA Euro 1996. However, Scotland respectively lost 1-0 and 3-0 to Morocco and Brazil in their two subsequent group games; this left them with a 42% percent chance of qualifying via the third-placed table, however, following other results this soon dropped as low as 0.07%. Following Croatia's 2-1 win over Ghana, Scotland were eliminated from the 2026 World Cup. At the same time, Steve Clarke announced his resignation as Scotland's manager despite signing a new 4 year contract extension before the tournament started.

== Stadium ==
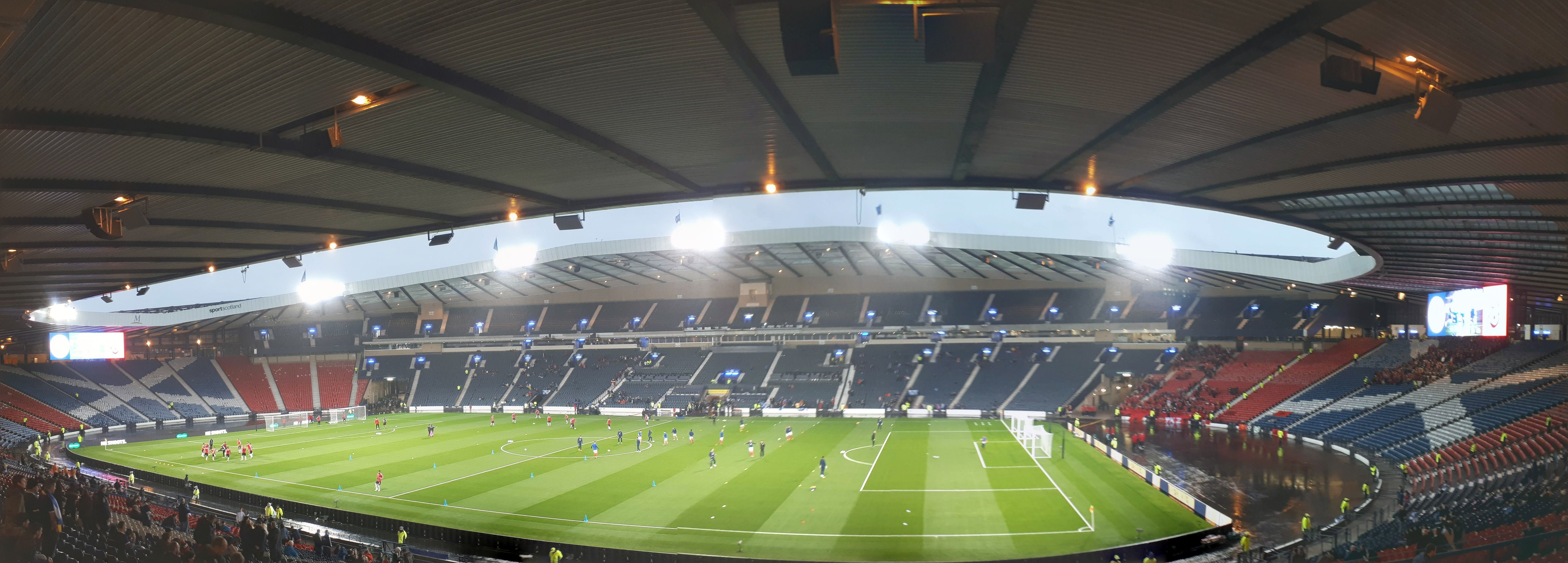
Hampden Park in Glasgow, the home stadium of the Scotland national football team

Hampden Park in Glasgow is the traditional home of the Scotland team and is described by the SFA as the National Stadium. The present stadium is one of three stadiums to have used the name. Stadiums named Hampden Park have hosted international matches since 1878. The present site was opened in 1903 and became the primary home ground of the Scotland team from 1906. The attendance record of 149,415 was set by the Scotland v England match in 1937. Safety regulations reduced the capacity to 81,000 by 1977 and the stadium was completely redeveloped during the 1990s, giving the present capacity of 52,000. Hampden is rated as a category four (elite) stadium within the UEFA stadium categories, having previously held the five-star status under the old rating system.

Some friendly matches are played at smaller venues. Pittodrie Stadium in Aberdeen and Easter Road in Edinburgh were both used as venues during 2017. Other stadiums were also used while Hampden was being redeveloped during the 1990s. Celtic Park, Ibrox Stadium, Pittodrie Stadium and Rugby Park all hosted matches during the 1998 World Cup qualifying campaign, while Tynecastle Stadium, Pittodrie, Celtic Park and Ibrox Stadium were used for Euro 2000 qualifying matches. Since the last redevelopment to Hampden was completed in 1999, Scotland have played most of their competitive matches there. The most recent exception to this rule was in 2014, when Hampden was temporarily converted into an athletics stadium for the 2014 Commonwealth Games. The SFA purchased Hampden from Queen's Park in 2020, and all of Scotland's home games have been played there since then.

== Media coverage ==
Matches played by Scotland are presently broadcast by BBC Scotland, under an arrangement reached with UEFA in March 2025. Sky Sports, STV, Setanta Sports, Channel 5, BT Sport, Pick, Premier Sports, Viaplay, ITV4, and YouTube have previously shown Scotland fixtures. Matches are also broadcast with full commentary on BBC Radio Scotland and, when schedules allow, BBC Radio 5 Live also.

Until the BBC acquired the rights in 2025, Scotland matches were regularly broadcast on subscription services. These arrangements were criticised in 2008 by the Scottish Government, who argued that all competitive internationals should be a Listed Event that can only be broadcast on free-to-air television. Live coverage is only restricted during major tournament finals, which are normally shown on BBC Scotland or STV. The SFA argued that limiting the rights for other games, such as qualifying matches, would reduce the revenue from that source.

The Scottish Affairs Committee of MPs in the British House of Commons published a report in 2023 calling for more co-operation between rights holders. They also pointed to the greater coverage given on free-to-air television for qualifying matches involving England and Wales. Two friendly matches in 2024 were shown on the BBC, following an agreement with Viaplay, and in March 2025 the BBC secured rights for all Scotland matches between then and the 2026 World Cup.

== Colours ==
Tartan-style kit with blue shorts worn at UEFA Euro 1996

Scotland traditionally wears dark blue shirts with white shorts and dark blue socks, the colours of the Queen's Park team who represented Scotland in the first international. The blue Scotland shirt was earlier used in a February 1872 rugby international, with reports stating that "the scotch were easily distinguishable by their uniform of blue jerseys.... the jerseys having the thistle embroidered". The thistle had previously been worn to represent Scotland in the 1871 rugby international, but on brown shirts. The shirt is embroidered with a crest based upon the lion rampant of the Royal Standard of Scotland.

Another style often used by Scotland comprises blue shirts, white shorts and red socks, whilst several kits have used navy shorts and socks. Navy is routinely used as alternative colours for the shorts and socks when Scotland faces a team who share the same colours for these items, but when the home shirt is still appropriate.

From 1994 to 1996, a tartan kit was used; this kit was worn in all three of Scotland's matches at UEFA Euro 1996.

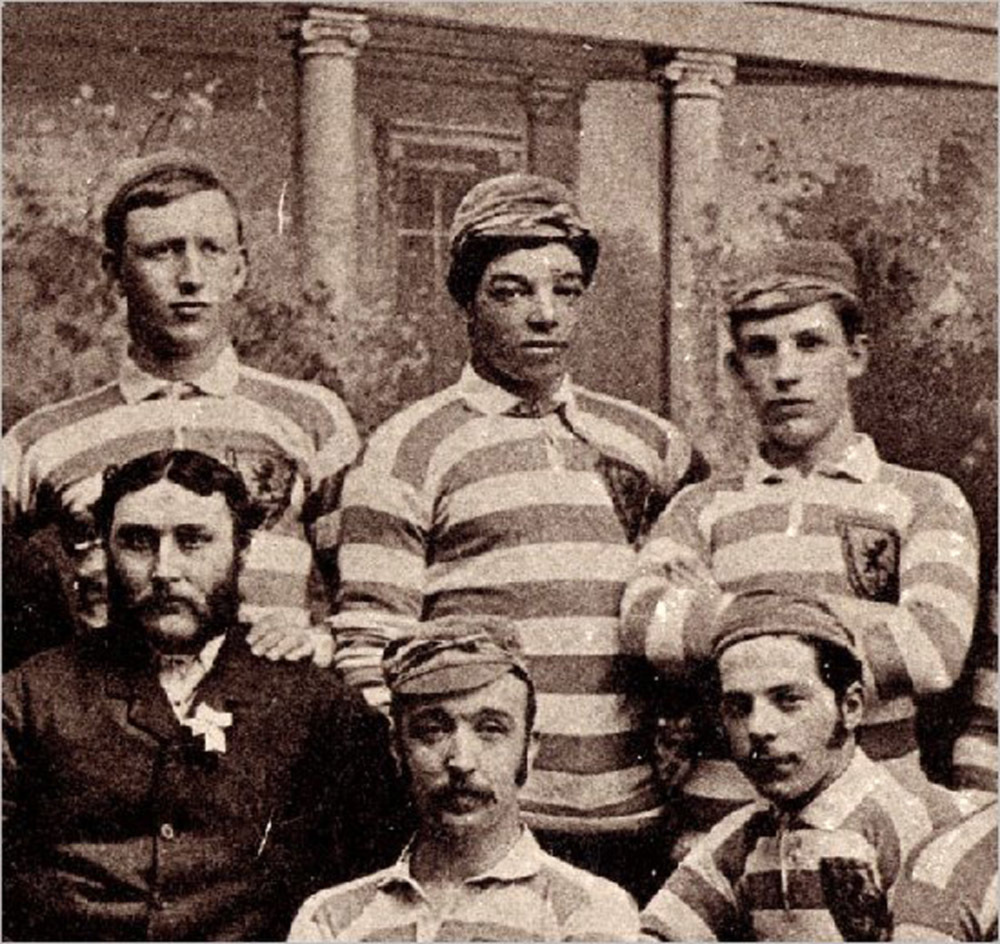
Scotland players, including Andrew Watson (top centre), wearing an atypical light blue-and-white hooped jersey in 1882

Scotland have not always played in dark blue; on a number of occasions between 1881 and 1951 they played in the primrose and pink racing colours of Archibald Primrose, 5th Earl of Rosebery. A former Prime Minister, Lord Rosebery was an influential figure in Scottish football, serving as honorary President of the SFA and Edinburgh team Hearts. His colours were used most frequently in the first decade of the 20th century. When Scotland defeated England 4–1 in 1900, Lord Rosebery remarked, "I have never seen my colours so well sported since Ladas won the Derby". Rosebery colours were revived as a change kit for the UEFA Euro 2016 qualifying matches.

Change colours vary, but are most commonly white or yellow shirts with blue shorts. In 2016–17, Scotland wore pink shirts with black shorts and socks as the away kit; the kit was additionally used in a single home match against Slovakia due to both Slovakia kits clashing with the Scotland home kit, which featured white sleeves. Third kits have been produced on two occasions. Amber shirts, navy shorts and navy socks were used in 2005–06, as the alternative sky blue shirts were unsuitable when Scotland travelled to teams wearing any shade of blue shirt, while an all 'cherry red' kit was used a single time against Georgia in the Euro 2008 qualifiers in 2007. Salmon pink was again adopted as a change colour ahead of the 2026 World Cup, although the SFA described it as "scarlet red".

=== Crest ===
The current version of the crest is a roundel similar to the crest used from 1961 to 1988 enclosing a shield, with "Scotland" written on the top and "Est 1873" on the bottom. In the shield background there are 11 thistles, representing the national flower of Scotland, in addition to the lion rampant. Since 2005, the SFA have supported the use of Scottish Gaelic on the national team's strip in recognition of the language's status in Scotland.

=== Kit suppliers ===
Kit supplier	Period
None	1872–1953
(England) Umbro	1953–2000
(South Korea) Fila	2000–2003
(Italy) Diadora	2003–2010
(Germany) Adidas	2010–

== Supporters ==
Scotland fans are collectively known as the Tartan Army. During the 1970s, Scotland fans were known for their hooliganism in England, particularly after they invaded the Wembley pitch and destroyed the goalposts after the England v Scotland match in 1977. Since then, the Tartan Army have won awards from UEFA for their combination of vocal support, friendly nature and charity work. The Tartan Army have been awarded a Fair Play prize by the Belgian Olympic Committee and were named as the best supporters during the 1992 European Championship. The fans were also presented with a trophy for non-violence in sport and were voted by journalists to be the best supporters for their sense of fair play and sporting spirit at the 1998 World Cup in France.

== Results and fixtures ==
The following is a list of match results in the last 12 months, as well as any future matches that have been scheduled.

Win Draw Loss Fixture

=== 2026 ===
28 March 2026 Friendly	Scotland	0–1	Japan	Glasgow, Scotland
		Report	Itō 84'	Stadium: Hampden Park; Attendance: 44,644; Referee: Shaun Evans (Australia)

31 March 2026 Friendly	Ivory Coast	1–0	Scotland	Liverpool, England
	Pépé 12'	Report		Stadium: Hill Dickinson Stadium; Attendance: 33,034; Referee: Daniel Elder (Australia)

30 May 2026 Friendly	Scotland	4–1	Curaçao	Glasgow, Scotland
	Curtis 45+2'; Shankland 59', 64'; Christie 81' (pen.)	Report	Chong 17'	Stadium: Hampden Park; Attendance: 44,433; Referee: Goga Kikacheishvili (Georgia)

6 June 2026 Friendly	Bolivia	0–4	Scotland	Harrison, United States
		Report	Shankland 5'; McTominay 23'; Adams 30', 45'	Stadium: Sports Illustrated Stadium; Attendance: 9,000; Referee: Rosendo Mendoza (United States)

13 June 2026 2026 World Cup Group C	Haiti	0–1	Scotland	Foxborough, United States
		Report	McGinn 28'	Stadium: Gillette Stadium; Attendance: 64,146; Referee: Mustapha Ghorbal (Algeria)

19 June 2026 2026 World Cup Group C	Scotland	0–1	Morocco	Foxborough, United States
		Report	Saibari 2'	Stadium: Gillette Stadium; Attendance: 64,146; Referee: Ilgiz Tantashev (Uzbekistan)

24 June 2026 2026 World Cup Group C	Scotland	0–3	Brazil	Miami Gardens, United States
		Report	Vinícius 7', 45+3'; Cunha 60'	Stadium: Hard Rock Stadium; Attendance: 64,478; Referee: César Arturo Ramos (Mexico)

26 September 2026 2026–27 UEFA Nations League B	Slovenia	0–0	Scotland	Ljubljana, Slovenia
		Report		Stadium: Stožice Stadium; Attendance: 12,182; Referee: Horațiu Feșnic (Romania)

29 September 2026 2026–27 UEFA Nations League B	Scotland	0–3	Switzerland	Glasgow, Scotland
		Report	Rodriguez 12'; Elvedi 55'; Amdouni 82'	Stadium: Hampden Park; Attendance: 41,028; Referee: Nenad Minaković (Serbia)

3 October 2026 2026–27 UEFA Nations League B	North Macedonia	0–2	Scotland	Skopje, North Macedonia
		Report	Bowie 7'; McGinn 70' (pen.)	Stadium: Toše Proeski Arena; Attendance: 8,256; Referee: François Letexier (France)

6 October 2026 2026–27 UEFA Nations League B	Scotland	1–2	Slovenia	Glasgow, Scotland
	Christie 34'	Report	Matko 56'; Šturm 71'	Stadium: Hampden Park; Attendance: 34,466; Referee: José María Sánchez Martínez (Spain)

13 November 2026 2026–27 UEFA Nations League B	Scotland	2–1	North Macedonia	Glasgow, Scotland
	McGinn 54', 74' (pen.)	Report	Rastoder 57'	Stadium: Hampden Park; Attendance: 41,585; Referee: Michal Očenáš (Slovakia)

16 November 2026 2026–27 UEFA Nations League B	Switzerland	4–0	Scotland	St. Gallen, Switzerland
	Ferguson 22' (o.g.); Boteli 47'; Sanches 51'; Amdouni 89'	Report		Stadium: Sitterstadion; Attendance: 17,742; Referee: Danny Makkelie (Netherlands)

== Coaching staff ==
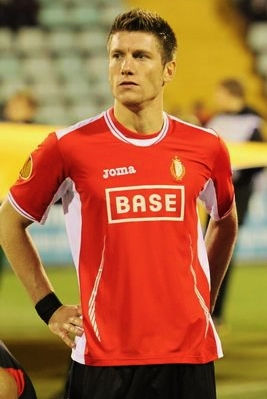
Sébastien Pocognoli, the current Scotland manager (pictured in 2011).

The role of a team manager was first established in May 1954, as Andy Beattie took charge of six matches before and during the 1954 FIFA World Cup. Until then the team had been picked by a SFA selection committee, and after the tournament the selection committee resumed control of the team until the appointment of Matt Busby in 1958. Busby was initially unable to assume his duties due to the serious injuries he sustained in the Munich air disaster.

Twenty-four men have occupied the post since its inception, with Beattie, Jock Stein and Alex McLeish occupying it in two spells. Six of those managers held the post on a caretaker basis. Craig Brown held the position for the longest to date; a tenure of 9 years, comprising two major tournaments and a total of 71 matches. Beattie (1954), Dawson Walker (1958), Willie Ormond (1974), Ally MacLeod (1978), Jock Stein (1982), Alex Ferguson (1986), Andy Roxburgh (1990 and 1992), Brown (1996 and 1998) and Steve Clarke (2020, 2024 and 2026) have all managed the team at major competitions. Ian McColl, Ormond and MacLeod all won the British Home Championship outright.

German coach Berti Vogts became the first foreign manager of the team in 2002, but his time in charge was generally seen as a failure and the FIFA World Ranking declined to an all-time low of 88 in March 2005. Walter Smith and Alex McLeish achieved better results, with the ranking improving to an all-time high of 13 in October 2007, but both were only briefly in charge before returning to club management. George Burley and Craig Levein both had worse results with the team and were eventually sacked. Results improved somewhat under Gordon Strachan, but he was unable to secure qualification for a tournament. After McLeish had a second spell as manager, Steve Clarke was appointed in May 2019. Clarke guided the team to qualification for Euro 2020, their first major competition since 1998, Euro 2024 and the 2026 World Cup.

=== Current personnel ===
As of 9 September 2026

Position	Name
Head Coach	Sébastien Pocognoli
Assistant Coach	Alan Irvine; Luke Benstead; Cameron Campbell
Goalkeeping Coach	Chris Woods

=== Statistical record ===
The following table provides a summary of the complete record of each Scotland manager, including their progress in both the World Cup and the European Championship. Statistically the most successful manager was Alex McLeish, who won seven of the ten games in his first spell. Discounting managers who took charge of less than ten games, the least successful manager was George Burley, with just three wins in 14 games.

Name	Scotland career	Played	Won	Drawn	Lost	Win %	PPG
Selection committee	1872–1953	231	139	42	50	60.17	1.99
Andy Beattie	1954	6	2	1	3	33.33	1.17
Selection committee	1954–1957	23	10	7	6	43.48	1.61
Dawson Walker (Note: Dawson Walker was left in charge of the players due to the Munich air disaster, in which official manager Matt Busby was seriously injured.)	1958	6	1	2	3	16.67	0.83
Matt Busby	1958	2	1	1	0	50.00	2
Andy Beattie	1959–1960	12	3	3	6	25.00	1
Ian McColl	1960–1965	28	17	3	8	60.71	1.93
Jock Stein	1965–1966	7	3	1	3	42.86	1.43
John Prentice	1966	4	0	1	3	0.00	0.25
Malky McDonald (Note: Served as manager on a caretaker basis.)	1966–1967	2	1	1	0	50.00	2
Bobby Brown	1967–1971	33	14	8	11	42.42	1.52
Tommy Docherty	1971–1972	12	7	2	3	58.33	1.92
Willie Ormond	1973–1977	38	18	8	12	47.37	1.63
Ally MacLeod	1977–1978	17	7	5	5	41.18	1.53
Jock Stein	1978–1985	61	26	12	23	42.62	1.48
Alex Ferguson (Note: Alex Ferguson was interim manager, following the death of Jock Stein.)	1985–1986	10	3	4	3	30.00	1.3
Andy Roxburgh	1986–1993	61	23	19	19	37.70	1.44
Craig Brown (Note: Craig Brown's record includes one 1993 match in interim charge (Italy 3–1 Scotland) prior to his full appointment; it is not included in his SFA website profile, which assigns no manager to this fixture.)	1993–2002	71	32	18	21	45.07	1.61
Berti Vogts	2002–2004	32	9	7	16	28.13	1.06
Tommy Burns	2004	1	0	0	1	0.00	0
Walter Smith	2004–2007	16	7	5	4	43.75	1.63
Alex McLeish	2007	10	7	0	3	70.00	2.1
George Burley	2008–2009	14	3	3	8	21.43	0.86
Craig Levein	2009–2012	24	10	5	9	41.67	1.46
Billy Stark	2012	1	1	0	0	100.00	3
Gordon Strachan	2013–2017	40	19	9	12	47.50	1.65
Malky Mackay	2017	1	0	0	1	0.00	0
Alex McLeish	2018–2019	12	5	0	7	41.67	1.25
Steve Clarke (Note: Steve Clarke's profile at the SFA website records penalty shootout victories over Israel and Serbia in 2020 as wins; most statistical resources record the outcome of such matches as a draw, albeit the winner of the shootout progresses, and they have been counted as draws in the table.)	2019–2026	81	36	16	29	44.44	1.53
Sébastien Pocognoli	2026–present	6	2	1	3	33.33	1.4
Totals		861	406	184	271	47.15	1.63

Last updated: Scotland v North Macedonia, 13 November 2026. Statistics include official FIFA-recognised matches, five matches from the 1967 SFA tour that were reclassified as full internationals in 2021, and a match against a Hong Kong League XI played on 23 May 2002 that the Scottish Football Association includes in its statistical totals.

== Players ==
=== Latest squad ===
The following players were called up for the 2026–27 UEFA Nations League matches in November 2026.

Caps and goals updated as of 16 November 2026, after the match against Switzerland. Clubs correct as of 1 September 2026.

No.	Pos.	Player	Date of birth (age)	Caps	Goals	Club
1	GK	Angus Gunn	22 January 1996 (age 30)	31	0	(United States Soccer Federation) San Jose Earthquakes
12	GK	Liam Kelly	23 January 1996 (age 30)	3	0	(Scottish Football Association) Rangers
21	GK	Scott Bain	22 November 1991 (age 35)	4	0	(Scottish Football Association) Falkirk
	GK	Jon McCracken	24 May 2000 (age 26)	0	0	(The Football Association) Bradford City
2	DF	Aaron Hickey	10 June 2002 (age 24)	27	0	(The Football Association) Brentford
3	DF	Andy Robertson (captain)	11 March 1994 (age 32)	103	4	(The Football Association) Tottenham Hotspur
5	DF	Ryan Porteous	25 March 1999 (age 27)	15	1	(United States Soccer Federation) Los Angeles FC
6	DF	Kieran Tierney	5 June 1997 (age 29)	60	2	(Scottish Football Association) Celtic
13	DF	Jack Hendry	7 May 1995 (age 31)	44	3	(Saudi Arabian Football Federation) Al-Ettifaq
14	DF	James Penrice	22 December 1998 (age 27)	0	0	(Scottish Football Association) Rangers
18	DF	Luke Graham	11 February 2004 (age 22)	3	0	(The Football Association) Stoke City
22	DF	Nathan Patterson	16 October 2001 (age 25)	31	1	(Italian Football Federation) Torino
	DF	David Bates	5 October 1996 (age 30)	4	0	(Turkish Football Federation) Amedspor
4	MF	Scott McTominay	8 December 1996 (age 29)	75	15	(Italian Football Federation) Napoli
7	MF	John McGinn	18 October 1994 (age 32)	95	24	(The Football Association) Aston Villa
8	MF	Billy Gilmour	11 June 2001 (age 25)	52	2	(Italian Football Federation) Napoli
11	MF	Ryan Christie	22 February 1995 (age 31)	76	11	(The Football Association) Bournemouth
15	MF	Josh McPake	31 August 2001 (age 25)	1	0	(Scottish Football Association) Heart of Midlothian
19	MF	Lewis Ferguson	24 August 1999 (age 27)	33	1	(Italian Football Federation) Bologna
23	MF	Kristi Montgomery	31 May 2004 (age 22)	1	0	(The Football Association) Blackburn Rovers
9	FW	Oli McBurnie	4 June 1996 (age 30)	22	0	(The Football Association) Hull City
10	FW	Ché Adams	13 July 1996 (age 30)	51	13	(Italian Football Federation) Torino
16	FW	Findlay Curtis	9 June 2006 (age 20)	6	1	(Scottish Football Association) Rangers
17	FW	Ben Gannon-Doak	11 November 2005 (age 21)	23	1	(The Football Association) Bournemouth
20	FW	Kieron Bowie	21 September 2002 (age 24)	7	1	(Italian Football Federation) Sassuolo
	FW	Robbie Ure	24 February 2004 (age 22)	4	0	(Royal Spanish Football Federation) Sevilla

=== Recent call-ups ===
The following players have also been selected by Scotland in the past twelve months.

Pos.	Player	Date of birth (age)	Caps	Goals	Club	Latest call-up
GK	Craig Gordon^{RET}	31 December 1982 (age 43)	84	0	Retired	2026 FIFA World Cup
DF	Luis Binks^{INJ}	2 September 2001 (age 25)	3	0	(Denmark) Brøndby	v. North Macedonia, 13 November 2026
DF	Stephen Welsh^{INJ}	19 January 2000 (age 26)	4	0	(Wales) Swansea City	v. North Macedonia, 13 November 2026
DF	Josh Doig	18 May 2002 (age 24)	2	0	(Italy) Sassuolo	v. Slovenia, 6 October 2026
DF	Colby Donovan	7 September 2006 (age 20)	0	0	(Scotland) Celtic	v. Slovenia, 6 October 2026
DF	Scott McKenna^{SUS}	12 November 1996 (age 30)	54	1	(Croatia) Dinamo Zagreb	v. North Macedonia, 3 October 2026
DF	Grant Hanley	20 November 1991 (age 35)	70	2	(Scotland) Hibernian	2026 FIFA World Cup
DF	Anthony Ralston	16 November 1998 (age 28)	29	1	(Scotland) Celtic	2026 FIFA World Cup
DF	John Souttar	25 September 1996 (age 30)	24	2	(Scotland) Rangers	2026 FIFA World Cup
DF	Dominic Hyam	20 December 1995 (age 30)	4	0	(Wales) Wrexham	2026 FIFA World Cup
DF	Ross McCrorie	18 March 1998 (age 28)	2	0	(Scotland) Rangers	v. Ivory Coast, 31 March 2026
MF	Lennon Miller	25 August 2006 (age 20)	4	0	(Italy) Udinese	v. Slovenia, 6 October 2026
MF	Kenny McLean^{INJ}	8 January 1992 (age 34)	61	3	(England) Norwich City	v. Slovenia, 26 September 2026
MF	Tyler Fletcher	19 March 2007 (age 19)	2	0	(England) Manchester United	2026 FIFA World Cup
MF	Andy Irving	13 May 2000 (age 26)	1	0	(Czech Republic) Sparta Prague	v. Ivory Coast, 31 March 2026
FW	James Wilson^{U21}	6 March 2007 (age 19)	2	0	(Scotland) Heart of Midlothian	v. Slovenia, 26 September 2026
FW	Lyndon Dykes	7 October 1995 (age 31)	53	10	(England) Millwall	2026 FIFA World Cup
FW	Lawrence Shankland	10 August 1995 (age 31)	22	7	(Scotland) Rangers	2026 FIFA World Cup
FW	George Hirst	15 February 1999 (age 27)	10	1	(England) Stoke City	2026 FIFA World Cup
FW	Ross Stewart	11 July 1996 (age 30)	4	0	(Wales) Swansea City	2026 FIFA World Cup
FW	Tommy Conway	6 August 2002 (age 24)	8	0	(England) Middlesbrough	v. Ivory Coast, 31 March 2026
^{INJ} Player withdrew from the squad for that game due to injury; ^{U21} Player was reassigned to the under-21 squad; ^{RET} Player has retired from the national team / playing football; ^{SUS} Player is serving a suspension; ^{PRE} Player was named in a preliminary squad / standby

=== Honoured players ===
The Scottish Football Association operates a roll of honour for every player who has made more than 50 appearances for Scotland. As of May 2026 there are 43 members of this roll, with Kieran Tierney the most recent addition to the list. The qualifying mark of 50 appearances means that many notable Scotland players including Jim Baxter, Davie Cooper, Hughie Gallacher (and every other pre-Second World War player), Archie Gemmill, John Greig, Jimmy Johnstone, Billy McNeill, Bobby Murdoch and Lawrie Reilly are not on the roll of honour.

The Scottish Football Museum operates a hall of fame which is open to players and managers involved in Scottish football. This means that membership is not restricted to people who have played for Scotland; inductees include Brian Laudrup and Henrik Larsson, as well as John McGovern who never played in Scotland or gained an international cap. Sportscotland operates the Scottish Sports Hall of Fame, which has inducted some footballers.

== Records ==
=== Team records ===
The largest margin of victory achieved by a Scotland side is 11–0 against Ireland in the 1901 British Home Championship. The record defeat occurred during the 1954 FIFA World Cup, a 7–0 deficit against reigning world champions Uruguay.

Scotland's 1937 British Home Championship match against England set a new world record for a football attendance. The Hampden Park crowd was officially recorded as 149,415, though the true figure is unknown as a large number of additional fans gained unauthorised entry. This attendance was surpassed 13 years later by the decisive match of the 1950 FIFA World Cup, but remains a European record.

=== Player records ===
==== Most capped players ====
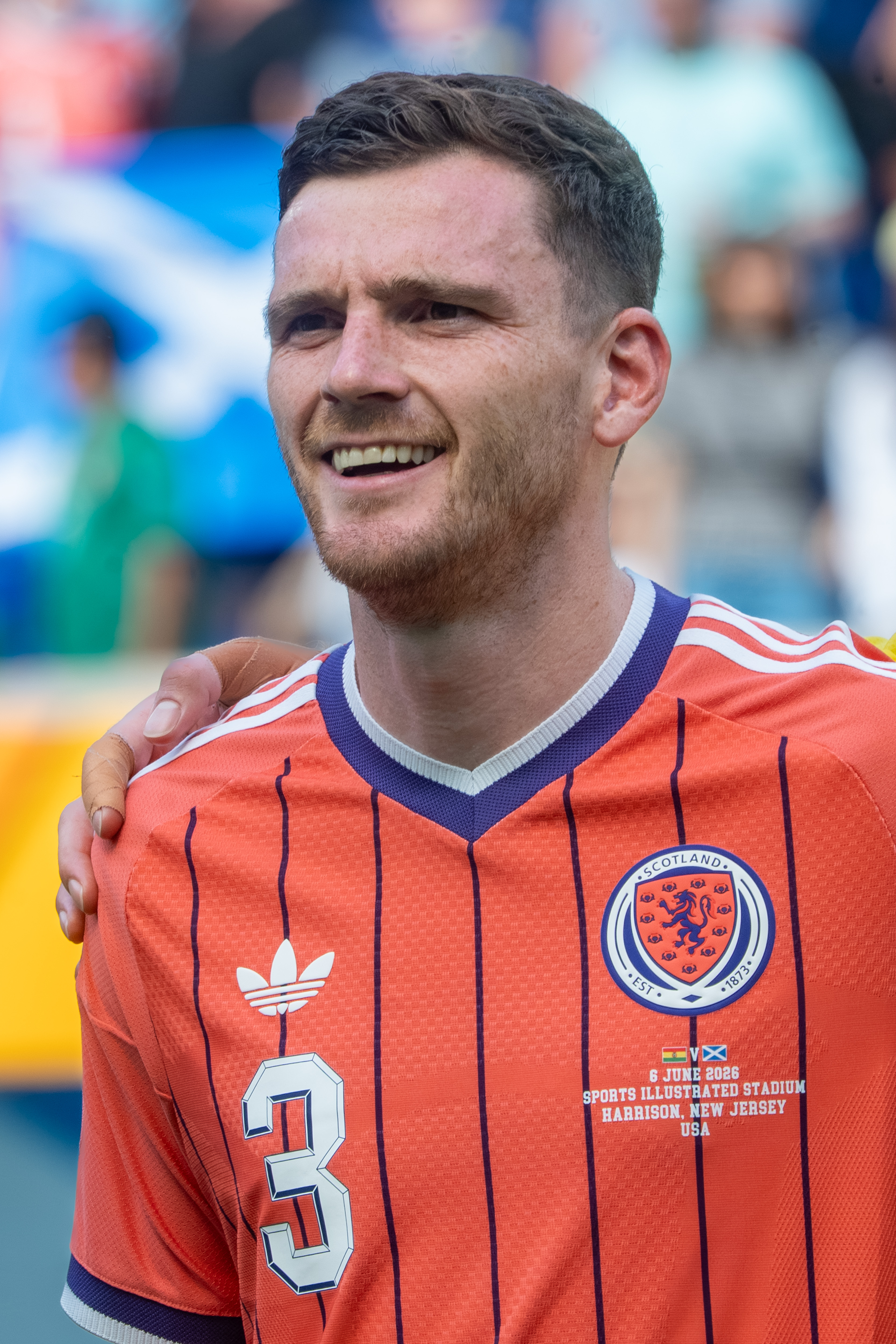
Andy Robertson is Scotland's most capped player with 103 international appearances

.

As of 16 November 2026
Players in bold are still active with Scotland.

Rank	Player	Caps	Goals	Career
1	**Andy Robertson**	103	4	2014–present
2	Kenny Dalglish	102	30	1971–1986
3	**John McGinn**	95	24	2016–present
4	Jim Leighton	91	0	1982–1998
5	Craig Gordon	84	0	2004–2026
6	Darren Fletcher	80	5	2003–2017
7	Alex McLeish	77	0	1980–1993
8	Paul McStay	76	9	1983–1997
8	**Ryan Christie**	76	11	2017–present
10	**Scott McTominay**	75	15	2018–present

==== Top goalscorers ====
The title of Scotland's highest goalscorer is shared by two players. Denis Law scored 30 goals between 1958 and 1974, during which time he played for Scotland on 55 occasions. Kenny Dalglish scored an equal number from 102 appearances. Hughie Gallacher as well as being the third highest scorer is also the most prolific with his 24 goals coming from only 20 games (averaging 1.2 goals per game). (Note: There is some uncertainty over one of Hughie Gallacher's international goals, the sixth in the 7–3 win over Ireland in 1929: both Gallacher (who had already scored four times) and Alex James went for the ball at the same point. Correspondence between Queen of the South FC and the Scottish Football Museum in 2016 favoured Gallacher, stating "Hughie himself was insistent that the goal was his, claiming that as he and Alex James (who was a good friend of his) were of a similar build (and of course in 1929 there were no numbers on the jerseys), it was easy for pressmen to make a mistake". James remains credited with the goal in some sources (including the Scottish Football Association website profiles as of 2021) while others such as the Scottish Football Hall of Fame include the contradictory statement that Gallacher's total was 23 goals but that he scored a record five in a match against Ireland.)

As of 16 November 2026
Players in bold are still active with Scotland.

Rank	Player	Goals	Caps	Ratio	Career
1	Denis Law (list)	30	55	0.55	1958–1974
1	Kenny Dalglish (list)	30	102	0.29	1971–1986
3	Hughie Gallacher	24	20	1.2	1924–1935
3	**John McGinn**	24	95	0.25	2016–present
5	Lawrie Reilly	22	38	0.58	1948–1957
6	Ally McCoist	19	61	0.31	1986–1998
7	Kenny Miller	18	69	0.26	2001–2013
8	Robert Hamilton	15	11	1.36	1899–1911
8	James McFadden	15	48	0.31	2002–2010
8	**Scott McTominay**	15	75	0.2	2018–present

== Competitive record ==
=== FIFA World Cup ===
Scotland did not compete in the first three World Cup competitions, held in 1930, 1934 and 1938. FIFA ruled that all its member associations must provide "broken-time" payments to cover the expenses of players who participated in football at the 1928 Summer Olympics. In response to what they considered to be unacceptable interference, the football associations of Scotland, England, Ireland and Wales held a meeting at which they agreed to resign from FIFA. The SFA did not rejoin FIFA as a permanent member until 1946 and also declined to participate in 1950 although they had qualified, as Scotland were not the British champions.

Scotland have since qualified for nine finals tournaments, including five consecutive tournaments from 1974 to 1990. Scotland have never advanced beyond the first round of the finals competition – no country has qualified for as many World Cup finals without progressing past the first round. They have missed out on progressing to the second round four times on goal difference: in 1974, when Brazil edged them out; in 1978, when the Netherlands progressed; in 1982, when the Soviet Union went through; and in 2026, when Senegal advanced.

Year	FIFA World Cup record									Qualification record						
Year	Round	Position	Pld	W	D	L	GF	GA	Squad	Pld	W	D	L	GF	GA	Position
(Uruguay) 1930	Not a FIFA member									Not a FIFA Member						
(Italy) 1934	Not a FIFA member									Not a FIFA Member						
(France) 1938	Not a FIFA member									Not a FIFA Member						
(Brazil) 1950	Qualified but withdrew									3	2	0	1	10	3	2nd / 4
(Switzerland) 1954	Group stage	15th	2	0	0	2	0	8	Squad	3	1	1	1	8	8	2nd / 4
(Sweden) 1958	Group stage	14th	3	0	1	2	4	6	Squad	4	3	0	1	10	9	1st / 3
(Chile) 1962	Did not qualify									5	3	0	2	12	11	2nd / 3
(England) 1966	Did not qualify									6	3	1	2	8	8	2nd / 4
(Mexico) 1970	Did not qualify									6	3	1	2	18	7	2nd / 4
(West Germany) 1974	Group stage	9th	3	1	2	0	3	1	Squad	4	3	0	1	8	3	1st / 3
(Argentina) 1978	Group stage	11th	3	1	1	1	5	6	Squad	4	3	0	1	6	3	1st / 3
(Spain) 1982	Group stage	15th	3	1	1	1	8	8	Squad	8	4	3	1	9	4	1st / 5
(Mexico) 1986	Group stage	19th	3	0	1	2	1	3	Squad	8	4	2	2	10	4	2nd / 4
(Italy) 1990	Group stage	19th	3	1	0	2	2	3	Squad	8	4	2	2	12	12	2nd / 5
(United States) 1994	Did not qualify									10	4	3	3	14	13	4th / 6
(France) 1998	Group stage	27th	3	0	1	2	2	6	Squad	10	7	2	1	15	3	2nd / 6
(Japan) (South Korea) 2002	Did not qualify									8	4	3	1	12	6	3rd / 5
(Germany) 2006	Did not qualify									10	3	4	3	9	7	3rd / 6
(South Africa) 2010	Did not qualify									8	3	1	4	6	11	3rd / 5
(Brazil) 2014	Did not qualify									10	3	2	5	8	12	4th / 6
(Russia) 2018	Did not qualify									10	5	3	2	17	12	3rd / 6
(Qatar) 2022	Did not qualify									11	7	2	2	18	10	2nd / 6
(Canada) (Mexico) (United States) 2026	Group stage	36th	3	1	0	2	1	4	Squad	6	4	1	1	13	7	1st / 4
(Morocco) (Portugal) (Spain) 2030	To be determined									To be determined						
(Saudi Arabia) 2034	To be determined									To be determined						
Totals	Group stage	9/23	26	5	7	14	26	45	—	142	73	31	38	223	153	—

Draws include knockout matches decided via penalty shoot-out; correct as of 24 June 2026 after the match against Brazil.

=== UEFA European Championship ===
Scotland have qualified for four European Championships, but have failed to advance beyond the first round. Their most recent participation was at Euro 2024.

Year	UEFA European Championship record								Qualification record						
Year	Round	Position	Pld	W	D	L	GF	GA	Pld	W	D	L	GF	GA	Position
(France) 1960	Did not enter								Did not enter						
(Spain) 1964	Did not enter								Did not enter						
(Italy) 1968	Did not qualify								6	3	2	1	10	8	2nd / 4
(Belgium) 1972	Did not qualify								6	3	0	3	4	7	3rd / 4
(Socialist Federal Republic of Yugoslavia) 1976	Did not qualify								6	2	3	1	8	6	3rd / 4
(Italy) 1980	Did not qualify								8	3	1	4	15	13	4th / 5
(France) 1984	Did not qualify								6	1	2	3	8	10	4th / 4
(West Germany) 1988	Did not qualify								8	3	3	2	7	5	4th / 5
(Sweden) 1992	Group stage	5th	3	1	0	2	3	3	8	4	3	1	14	7	1st / 5
(England) 1996	Group stage	12th	3	1	1	1	1	2	10	7	2	1	19	3	2nd / 6
(Belgium) (Netherlands) 2000	Did not qualify								12	6	3	3	16	12	2nd / 6 (Note: Scotland lost a play-off against England.)
(Portugal) 2004	Did not qualify								10	5	2	3	13	14	2nd / 5 (Note: Scotland lost a play-off against the Netherlands.)
(Austria) (Switzerland) 2008	Did not qualify								12	8	0	4	21	12	3rd / 7
(Poland) (Ukraine) 2012	Did not qualify								8	3	2	3	9	10	3rd / 5
(France) 2016	Did not qualify								10	4	3	3	22	12	4th / 6
(Europe) 2020	Group stage	22nd	3	0	1	2	1	5	12	5	2	5	17	20	3rd / 6 (Note: Scotland qualified by winning play-offs against Israel and Serbia.)
(Germany) 2024	Group stage	24th	3	0	1	2	2	7	8	5	2	1	17	8	2nd / 5
(England) (Scotland) (Wales) (Republic of Ireland) 2028	To be determined								To be determined						
(Italy) (Turkey) 2032	To be determined								To be determined						
Totals	Group stage	4/17	12	2	3	7	7	17	130	62	30	38	200	147	—

Draws include knockout matches decided via penalty shoot-out; correct as of 23 June 2024 after the match against Hungary.

=== UEFA Nations League ===
When the UEFA Nations League was inaugurated in 2018–19, Scotland were allocated to League C. With a 3–2 win against Israel in their final match, Scotland won promotion to League B of the 2020–21 competition.

Scotland won promotion to League A in their final match of the 2022–23 competition, a goalless draw against Ukraine in Kraków. They were immediately relegated back to League B in the 2024–25 competition, after losing a playoff against Greece.

UEFA Nations League record
League phase												Finals									Promotion/Relegation play-offs					
Season	LG	Grp	Pos	Pld	W	D	L	GF	GA	P/R	IR	Year	Pld	W	D	L	GF	GA	Squad	OR	Pld	W	D	L	GF	GA
2018–19	C	1	1st	4	3	0	1	10	4	▲	25th	2019	Did not qualify							25th	—N/a					
2020–21	B	2	2nd	6	3	1	2	5	4	Same position	23rd	2021	Did not qualify							23rd	—N/a					
2022–23	B	1	1st	6	4	1	1	11	5	▲	20th	2023	Did not qualify							20th	—N/a					
2024–25	A	1	3rd	6	2	1	3	7	8	▼	9th	2025	Did not qualify							9th	2	1	0	1	1	3
2026–27	B	1	3rd	4	1	1	2	3	5	TBD	TBD	2027	Did not qualify							TBD	—N/a					
Total				26	13	4	9	36	26	9th		Total	0	0	0	0	0	0		9th	2	1	0	1	1	3

Draws include knockout matches decided via penalty shoot-out; correct as of 6 October 2026, after the match against Slovenia.

== Honours ==
=== Regional ===
- British Home Championship
  - Champions (41): 1884, 1885, 1886^{s}, 1887, 1889^{s}, 1890, 1894, 1896, 1897, 1900, 1902, 1903^{s}, 1906^{s}, 1908^{s}, 1910, 1912^{s}, 1921, 1922, 1923, 1927^{s}, 1929, 1931^{s}, 1935, 1936, 1949, 1951, 1953^{s}, 1956^{s}, 1960^{s}, 1962, 1963, 1964^{s}, 1967, 1970^{s}, 1972^{s}, 1974^{s}, 1976, 1977

=== Friendly ===
- Rous Cup
  - Champions (1): 1985
- Kirin Cup
  - Champions (1): 2006
- Qatar Airways Cup
  - Champions (1): 2015

Notes

- ^{s} Shared titles

== United Kingdom team ==
Scotland has always participated by itself in most of the major football tournaments, such as the FIFA World Cup and the UEFA European Championship. At the Olympic Games the International Olympic Committee charter only permit a Great Britain Olympic football team, representing the whole of the United Kingdom, to compete. Teams of amateur players represented Great Britain at the Olympics from 1900 until 1972, but the FA stopped entering a team after then because the distinction between amateur and professional was abolished. The successful bid by London for the 2012 Summer Olympics prompted the FA to explore how a team could be entered. The SFA responded by stating that it would not participate, as it feared that this would threaten the independent status of the Scotland national team. FIFA President Sepp Blatter denied this, but the SFA expressed concern that a future President could take a different view. An agreement was reached in May 2009 whereby the FA would be permitted to organise a team using only England-qualified players, but this was successfully challenged by the British Olympic Association. Only English and Welsh players were selected for the men's squad, but two Scottish players were selected for the women's team.
