= Dawson Walker =

Scottish footballer and manager

Personal information
- Full name: Dawson Walker
- Date of birth: 14 March 1916
- Place of birth: Glasgow, Scotland
- Date of death: 17 August 1964 (aged 48)

Managerial career
- Years: Team
- 1958: Scotland (caretaker)

Dawson Walker (14 March 1916 – 17 August 1964) was manager of the Scotland national football team in 1958. Walker was left in charge of the players due to the Munich air disaster, in which official manager Matt Busby was seriously injured.

== Career ==
Walker became trainer for Clyde when Johnny Haddow was appointed manager in 1956. He had previously been trainer for Ashfield Juniors.

While the trainer at Shawfield, Walker would later become the trainer for the Scottish League XI and then the Scotland national team. He was Scotland's trainer on more than 80 occasions - an all-time record then.

Along with Haddow, both men resigned from their positions with the club in 1962.

== Managerial statistics ==
As of 28 March 2015

Team	Nat	From	To	Record				
Team	Nat	From	To	G	W	D	L	Win %
Scotland (caretaker)	(Scotland)	6 February 1958	15 June 1958	6	1	2	3	16.67
