= List of English non–League football stadiums =

This is a list of non-League football stadiums in England, ranked in descending order of capacity. There is an extremely large number of non-league football stadiums and pitches in England, and a definitive list of stadia would be impossible to produce. This list therefore includes:

- All football stadiums with a capacity of at least 5,000.

Non-League football describes football leagues played outside the top leagues of a country. Usually, it describes leagues which are not fully professional. The term is primarily used for football in England, where it is specifically used to describe all football played at levels below those of the Premier League (20 clubs) and the three divisions of the English Football League (EFL; 72 clubs). Currently, a non-League team would be any club playing in the National League or below that level. Typically, non-League clubs are either semi-professional or amateur in status, although the majority of clubs in the National League are fully professional, some of which are former EFL clubs who have suffered relegation.

== Existing stadiums ==
Overall non-League Rank	Stadium	Town / City	Capacity	Team	Image
1	Gigg Lane	Bury	12,500	Bury FC	
2	Roots Hall	Southend	12,392	Southend United	
3	Gateshead International Stadium	Gateshead	11,800	Gateshead	
4	The Shay	Halifax	10,400	FC Halifax Town	
5	Huish Park	Yeovil	9,665	Yeovil Town	
6	Glanford Park	Scunthorpe	9,183	Scunthorpe United	
7	Twerton Park	Bath	8,840	Bath City	
8	LNER Community Stadium	York	8,500	York City	
9	The Walks	King's Lynn	8,200	King's Lynn Town	
10	Victoria Park	Hartlepool	7,833	Hartlepool United	
11	Cherrywood Road	Farnborough	7,000	Farnborough	
12	Recreation Ground	Aldershot	7,000	Aldershot Town	
13	Bob Lucas stadium	Weymouth	6,600	Weymouth	
14	York Street	Boston	6,643	Boston United	
15	Plainmoor	Torquay	6,500	Torquay United	
16	Moss Rose	Macclesfield	5,400	Macclesfield Town	
17	New Bucks Head	Telford	6,300	AFC Telford United	
18	Aggborough	Kidderminster	6,238	Kidderminster Harriers	
19	Moss Lane	Altrincham	6,085	Altrincham	
20	Keys Park	Hednesford Town	6,039	Hednesford Town	
21	Haig Avenue	Southport	6,008	Southport	
22	Victoria Road	Dagenham	6,000	Dagenham & Redbridge	
23	Kingfield Stadium	Woking	6,000	Woking	
24	Mill Farm	Kirkham, Lancashire	6,000	AFC Fylde	
25	The Camrose	Basingstoke	6,000	Basingstoke Town	
26	Crabble Athletic Ground	Dover	5,745	Dover Athletic	
27	Damson Park	Solihull	5,500	Solihull Moors	
28	West Leigh Park	Havant	5,250	Havant & Waterlooville	
29	Silverlake Stadium	Eastleigh	5,192	Eastleigh	
30	Deva Stadium	Chester	5,126	Chester	
31	Gander Green Lane	London	5,013	Sutton United	
32	Stonebridge Road	Northfleet	5,011	Ebbsfleet United	

== See also ==
- Record home attendances of English football clubs
- List of Scottish football stadiums by capacity
- List of football stadiums in Wales by capacity
- List of association football stadiums by capacity
- List of European stadiums by capacity
- Development of stadiums in English football
- List of Premier League stadiums
- List of British stadiums by capacity
- List of English rugby union stadiums by capacity
- List of English rugby league stadiums by capacity
- List of association football stadiums by country
