= List of football stadiums in England =

This is a list of football stadiums in England, ranked in descending order of capacity. There is an extremely large number of football stadiums and pitches in England, and a definitive list of stadiums would be difficult to produce. This list, therefore, is limited to stadiums that meet one of the following criteria based on current capacity:

- Used for football and have a capacity larger than 5,000.
- Used by one of the 92 clubs in the top four tiers of the English football league system as of the 2025–26 season in the (Premier League, EFL Championship, EFL League One, and EFL League Two).
- Used by one of the 12 clubs in the top tier of women's football in England, the Women's Super League, as of 2025–26.

A person who has watched a match at the stadiums of all 92 Premier League and English Football League (EFL) clubs in England and Wales may apply to join The 92 Club.

== Current stadiums ==
Permitted operating capacity listed, gross capacity, when permitted, would rank stadium higher.

No.	Image	Stadium	Capacity	City	Home team	League	Opened
1		Wembley Stadium	90,000	Wembley, London	England (men's, women's and youth)		2007
2		Old Trafford	74,244	Old Trafford, Stretford	Manchester United	Premier League	1910
3		Tottenham Hotspur Stadium	62,850	Tottenham, London	Tottenham Hotspur	Premier League	2019
4		London Stadium (Note: Previously known as the Olympic Stadium)	62,500 (Note: Full capacity is 68,013; however, planning permission limits capacity to 62,500 seats for football events hosted by West Ham and 61,925 for athletics.)	Stratford, London	West Ham United	EFL Championship	2012
5		Anfield	61,276	Anfield, Liverpool	Liverpool	Premier League	1884
6		Etihad Stadium (Note: Formerly known as the City of Manchester Stadium.)	61,038	Bradford, Manchester	Manchester City	Premier League	2002
7		Emirates Stadium (Note: Known as Arsenal Stadium for UEFA competitions)	60,704	Holloway, London	Arsenal	Premier League	2006
7		Emirates Stadium	60,704	Holloway, London	Arsenal Women	Women's Super League	2006
8		Hill Dickinson Stadium	52,769	Bramley-Moore Dock, Vauxhall, Liverpool	Everton	Premier League	2025
9		St James' Park	52,719	Newcastle upon Tyne	Newcastle United	Premier League	1892
10		Stadium of Light	48,095	Monkwearmouth, Sunderland	Sunderland	Premier League	1997
11		Villa Park	43,205	Aston, Birmingham	Aston Villa	Premier League	1897
11		Villa Park	43,205	Aston, Birmingham	Aston Villa Women	Women's Super League	1897
12		Stamford Bridge	40,044	Fulham, London	Chelsea	Premier League	1877
13		Goodison Park	39,414	Walton, Liverpool	Everton Women	Women's Super League	1892
14		Elland Road	37,645	Beeston, Leeds	Leeds United	Premier League	1897
15		Hillsborough	34,835	Owlerton, Sheffield	Sheffield Wednesday	EFL League One	1899
16		Riverside Stadium	33,931	Middlesbrough	Middlesbrough	EFL Championship	1997
* (Note: Located in Wales but club plays in a top 4 tier of English Football)		Cardiff City Stadium	33,280	Leckwith, Cardiff	Cardiff City	EFL Championship	2009
17		Pride Park	32,956	Derby	Derby County	EFL Championship	1997
18		Coventry Building Society Arena	32,609	Coventry	Coventry City	Premier League	2005
19		St Mary's Stadium	32,384	Southampton	Southampton	EFL Championship	2001
19		St Mary's Stadium	32,384	Southampton	Southampton Women	Women's Super League 2	2001
20		King Power Stadium (Note: Formerly known as the Walkers Stadium.)	32,259	Leicester	Leicester City	EFL League One	2002
20		King Power Stadium	32,259	Leicester	Leicester City Women	Women's Super League	2002
21		Bramall Lane	32,050	Sheffield	Sheffield United	EFL Championship	1855
21		Bramall Lane	32,050	Sheffield	Sheffield United Women	Women's Super League 2	1855
22		Falmer Stadium (Note: Commercially known as The American Express Community Stadium.)	31,876	Falmer, Brighton & Hove	Brighton & Hove Albion	Premier League	2011
23		Molineux	31,750	Wolverhampton	Wolverhampton Wanderers	EFL Championship	1889
24		Ewood Park	31,363	Blackburn	Blackburn Rovers	EFL Championship	1882
25		City Ground	30,404	West Bridgford	Nottingham Forest	Premier League	1898
25		City Ground	30,404	West Bridgford	Nottingham Forest Women	Women's Super League 2	1898
26		Stadium MK	30,303	Denbigh, Milton Keynes	Milton Keynes Dons	EFL League One	2007
27		bet365 Stadium (Note: Formerly known as the Britannia Stadium.)	30,089	Stoke-on-Trent	Stoke City	EFL Championship	1997
28		Portman Road	29,813	Ipswich	Ipswich Town	Premier League	1884
29		St Andrew's	29,409	Bordesley, Birmingham	Birmingham City	EFL Championship	1906
29		St Andrew's	29,409	Bordesley, Birmingham	Birmingham City Women	Women's Super League 2	1906
30		Toughsheet Community Stadium (Note: Formerly known as the University of Bolton Stadium Reebok Stadium and Macron Stadium.)	28,018	Horwich, Bolton	Bolton Wanderers	EFL Championship	1997
31		Craven Cottage	27,782	Fulham, London	Fulham	Premier League	1896
32		Carrow Road	27,359	Norwich	Norwich City	EFL Championship	1935
33		The Valley	27,111	Charlton, London	Charlton Athletic	EFL Championship	1919
33		The Valley	27,111	Charlton, London	Charlton Athletic Women	Women's Super League 2	1919
34		Ashton Gate Stadium	27,000	Bristol	Bristol City	EFL Championship	1887
34		Ashton Gate Stadium	27,000	Bristol	Bristol City Women	Women's Super League 2	1887
35		The Hawthorns	26,688	West Bromwich	West Bromwich Albion	EFL Championship	1900
36		MKM Stadium (Note: Formerly known as the KC Stadium and KCOM Stadium.)	25,586	Hull	Hull City	Premier League	2002
37		Selhurst Park	25,194	Selhurst, London	Crystal Palace	Premier League	1924
38		Brick Community Stadium (Note: Previously known as the JJB Stadium and the DW Stadium.)	25,133	Wigan	Wigan Athletic	EFL League One	1999
39		Valley Parade (Note: Commercially known as the Northern Commercials Stadium.)	24,433	Bradford	Bradford City	EFL League One	1886
40		Madejski Stadium (Note: Commercially known as the Select Car Leasing Stadium)	24,376	Reading	Reading	EFL League One	1998
41		Kirklees Stadium (Note: Commercially known as the John Smith's Stadium, and formerly as the Alfred McAlpine Stadium and the Galpharm Stadium.)	24,329	Huddersfield	Huddersfield Town	EFL League One	1994
42		Deepdale	23,404	Preston	Preston North End	EFL Championship	1878
43		Oakwell	23,287	Barnsley	Barnsley	EFL League One	1888
44		Vicarage Road	22,200	Watford	Watford	EFL Championship	1921
45		Turf Moor	21,990	Burnley	Burnley	EFL Championship	1883
*		Liberty Stadium	20,996	Landore, Swansea	Swansea City	EFL Championship	2003
46		Fratton Park	20,899	Milton, Portsmouth	Portsmouth	EFL Championship	1899
47		Meadow Lane	19,841	Nottingham	Notts County	EFL League One	1910
48		The Den	19,369	Bermondsey, London	Millwall	EFL Championship	1993
49		Langtree Park (Note: Known as the Totally Wicked Stadium for sponsorship reasons.)	18,193	St Helens	Liverpool F.C. Women	Women's Super League	2011
50		Loftus Road (Note: QPR named the stadium Kiyan Prince Foundation Stadium from 2019–2022 in honour of former QPR youth player Kiyan Prince.)	18,193	White City, London	Queens Park Rangers	EFL Championship	1904
51		Home Park	17,904	Plymouth	Plymouth Argyle	EFL League One	1901
52		Brentford Community Stadium (Note: Commercially known as the Gtech Community Stadium)	17,250	Brentford, London	Brentford	Premier League	2020
53		Brunton Park	17,030	Carlisle	Carlisle United	National League	1909
54		Bloomfield Road	16,616	Blackpool	Blackpool	EFL League One	1899
55		County Ground	15,547	Swindon	Swindon Town	EFL League Two	1892
56		Club Doncaster Sports Village	15,148	Doncaster	Doncaster Rovers	EFL League One	2007
57		Vale Park	15,036	Burslem, Stoke-on-Trent	Port Vale	EFL League Two	1950
58		Prenton Park	15,012	Birkenhead	Tranmere Rovers	EFL League Two	1912
59		London Road (Note: Commercially known as The Weston Homes Stadium.)	13,513	Peterborough	Peterborough United	EFL League One	1913
60		Boundary Park	13,513	Oldham	Oldham Athletic	EFL League Two	1904
61		Kassam Stadium	12,537	Littlemore, Oxford	Oxford United	EFL League One	2001
62		Memorial Stadium	12,500	Horfield, Bristol	Bristol Rovers	EFL League Two	1921
63		Roots Hall	12,392	Southend	Southend United	National League	1952
64		New York Stadium	12,088	Rotherham	Rotherham United	EFL League Two	2012
65		Leigh Sports Village	12,000	Leigh	Manchester United Women	Women's Super League	2008
66		Gateshead International Stadium	11,800	Gateshead	Gateshead	National League	1955
66		Gateshead International Stadium	11,800	Gateshead	Newcastle United Women	Women's Super League 2	1955
67		Gigg Lane	11,640	Bury	Bury	Northern Premier League Division One West	1885
68		Priestfield Stadium	11,582	Gillingham	Gillingham	EFL League Two	1893
69		Dean Court (Note: Commercially known as the Vitality Stadium.)	11,307	Kings Park, Bournemouth	AFC Bournemouth	Premier League	1910
70		Bescot Stadium (Note: Commercially known as the Banks's Stadium.)	10,863	Bescot, Walsall	Walsall	EFL League Two	1990
71		Edgeley Park	10,800	Edgeley, Stockport	Stockport County	EFL League One	1891
72		Sincil Bank (Note: Known for sponsorship reasons as LNER Stadium.)	10,780	Lincoln	Lincoln City	EFL Championship	1895
73		The Shay	10,561	Halifax	Halifax Town	National League	1921
*		Racecourse Ground	10,500	Wrexham	Wrexham	EFL Championship	1801
74		SMH Group Stadium (Note: Formerly known as the B2net & ProAct Stadium.)	10,400	Chesterfield	Chesterfield	EFL League Two	2010
75		Kenilworth Road	10,265	Luton	Luton Town	EFL League One	1905
76		Kingston Park	10,210	Newcastle upon Tyne			1990
77		Gresty Road	10,109	Crewe	Crewe Alexandra	EFL League Two	1906
78		Colchester Community Stadium (Note: Commercially known as the Jobserve Community Stadium.)	10,105	Colchester	Colchester United	EFL League Two	2008
78		Colchester Community Stadium	10,105	Colchester	Ipswich Town Women	Women's Super League 2	2008
79		New Meadow	9,875	Shrewsbury	Shrewsbury Town	EFL League Two	2007
80		Huish Park	9,665	Yeovil	Yeovil Town	National League	1990
81		Adams Park	9,558	High Wycombe	Wycombe Wanderers	EFL League One	1990
82		Spotland	9,507	Rochdale	Rochdale	EFL League Two	1878
83		Field Mill (Note: Commercially known as the One Call Stadium.)	9,376	Mansfield	Mansfield Town	EFL League One	1861
84		Brisbane Road (Note: Commercially known as the Breyer Group Stadium.)	9,253	Leyton, London	Leyton Orient	EFL League One	1937
84		Brisbane Road	9,253	Leyton, London	Tottenham Hotspur Women	Women's Super League	1937
85		Glanford Park	9,183	Scunthorpe	Scunthorpe United	National League	1988
86		Plough Lane	9,150	Wimbledon, London	AFC Wimbledon	EFL League One	2020
87		Blundell Park	9,546	Cleethorpes	Grimsby Town	EFL League Two	1899
88		Twerton Park	8,880	Twerton, Bath	Bath City	National League South	1909
*		Rodney Parade	8,722	Newport	Newport County	EFL League Two	1877
89		St James Park	8,714	Exeter	Exeter City	EFL League Two	1904
90		York Community Stadium (Note: Commercially known as LNER Community Stadium)	8,500	Huntington, York	York City	EFL League Two	2021
91		Sixfields Stadium	8,203	Northampton	Northampton Town	EFL League Two	1994
92		The Walks	8,200	King's Lynn	King's Lynn Town	National League North	1881
93		Abbey Stadium	8,024	Cambridge	Cambridge United	EFL League One	1932
94		Victoria Park	7,833	Hartlepool	Hartlepool United	National League	1886
95		Broadhall Way (Note: Commercially known as the Lamex Stadium.)	7,426	Stevenage	Stevenage	EFL League One	1961
96		Recreation Ground (Note: Commercially known as the EBB Stadium.)	7,100	Aldershot	Aldershot Town	National League	1927
97		Pirelli Stadium	7,088	Burton-upon-Trent	Burton Albion	EFL League One	2005
98		Academy Stadium	7,000	Manchester	Manchester City Women	Women's Super League	2014
99		Whaddon Road (Note: Commercially known as the World of Smile Stadium.)	6,923	Cheltenham	Cheltenham Town	EFL League Two	1927
100		York Street (Note: Commercially known as the Jakemans Stadium)	6,643	Boston	Empty	N/A	1933
101		Holker Street	6,500	Barrow-in-Furness	Barrow	National League	1909
102		Plainmoor	6,500	Torquay	Torquay United	National League South	1921
103		Bower Fold	6,500	Stalybridge	Stalybridge Celtic	Northern Premier League Division One West	1906
104		Moss Rose	6,335	Macclesfield	Macclesfield	National League North	1891
105		New Bucks Head	6,300	Telford	Telford United	National League North	2003
106		Globe Arena (Note: Commercially known as Mazuma Stadium.)	6,241	Morecambe	Morecambe	National League North	2010
107		Aggborough	6,238	Kidderminster	Kidderminster Harriers	National League	1884
108		Moss Lane	6,085	Altrincham	Altrincham	National League	1910
109		Victoria Road (Note: Commercially known as Chigwell Construction Stadium, and formerly the London Borough of Barking and Dagenham Stadium.)	6,078	Dagenham, London	Dagenham & Redbridge	National League South	1917
109		Victoria Road	6,078	Dagenham, London	West Ham United Women	Women's Super League	1917
110		Keys Park	6,039	Cannock, Hednesford	Hednesford Town	National League North	1995
111		Haig Avenue	6,008	Blowick, Southport	Southport	National League North	1905
112		Kingfield Stadium	6,000	Woking	Woking	National League	1921
113		Mill Farm	6,000	Wesham	Fylde	National League	2016
114		The Camrose (Note: Commercially known as the Soccer AM Stadium.)	6,000	Basingstoke	Basingstoke Town	Southern Football League Premier Division South	1945
115		Cherrywood Road	6,000	Farnborough	Farnborough	National League South	1975
116		Broadfield Stadium (Note: Commercially known as The People's Pension Stadium.)	5,907	Crawley	Crawley Town	EFL League Two	1997
116		Broadfield Stadium	5,907	Crawley	Brighton & Hove Albion Women	Women's Super League	1997
117		Crabble Athletic Ground	5,745	Dover	Dover Athletic	National League South	1897
118		Damson Park	5,500	Solihull	Solihull Moors	National League	1998
119		Crown Ground (Note: Commercially known as the Wham Stadium.)	5,278	Accrington	Accrington Stanley	EFL League Two	1968
120		Westleigh Park	5,250	Havant	Havant & Waterlooville	National League South	1982
120		Westleigh Park	5,250	Havant	Portsmouth Women	Women's Super League 2	1982
121		Ten Acres (Note: Commercially known as the Silverlake Stadium.)	5,250	Eastleigh	Eastleigh	National League	1957
122		The Hive Stadium	5,233	Canons Park, London	Barnet	EFL League Two	2013
123		Kingsmeadow	5,139 (Note: Planning permission limits operating capacity to 4,850 seats.)	Kingston, London	Chelsea Women	Women's Super League	1989
124		Highbury Stadium	5,137	Fleetwood	Fleetwood Town	EFL League Two	1939
125		Deva Stadium (Note: Straddles the England–Wales border.)	5,126	Chester	Chester	National League North	1992
126		Boston Community Stadium (Note: Commercially known as the Jakemans Community Stadium)	5,061	Boston	Boston United	National League	2020
127		Gander Green Lane	5,049	Sutton, London	Sutton United	National League	1912
127		Gander Green Lane	5,049	Sutton, London	Crystal Palace Women	Women's Super League 2	1912
128		Moor Lane	5,032	Kersal, Salford	Salford City	EFL League Two	1978
129		Wetherby Road	5,021	Harrogate	Harrogate Town	National League	1920
130		Stonebridge Road	5,011	Northfleet, Gravesend	Ebbsfleet United	National League South	1905
131		The New Lawn	5,009	Nailsworth	Forest Green Rovers	National League	2006
132		Hayes Lane	5,000	Bromley, London	Bromley	EFL League One	1938
132		Hayes Lane	5,000	Bromley, London	London City Lionesses	Women's Super League	1938

== Old stadiums ==
Following crowd troubles in the 1980s, and regulations imposed after the Taylor Report, several English league stadiums have been built or completely redeveloped in the last few years. Prior to 1988, however, the last newly built Football League ground in England was Roots Hall, Southend, which was opened in 1955.

== Future stadiums and developments ==
Stadiums which are currently being built, redeveloped, or have planning approval without work having commenced include:

Stadium	Expected capacity	Home team	Notes
New Trafford Stadium (new build)	100,000	Manchester United	New stadium proposed to replace Old Trafford, announced in March 2025.
Leazes Park Stadium (new build)	c. 65,000	Newcastle United	Possible new stadium proposed to replace St James' Park, with a tentative completion date of 2031.
New Birmingham City Stadium (new build)	c. 62,000	Birmingham City	On 9 April 2024, Birmingham City purchased a plot of land in Bordesley Green to use to build a 62,000-seat "super stadium", complete with a "Sports Quarter" that will house all of the club's teams and their training facilities. Costing £3bn, it will replace St Andrew's and has the optimistic goal of completion in time for the 2029–30 season.
City of Manchester Stadium (redevelopment) (under construction)	61,474	Manchester City	A final expansion phase, extending the second tier back with an additional 7,900 seats commenced in 2023, with completion aimed for 2026. The stadium's capacity after the third phase is expected to exceed 61,474.
Stamford Bridge (redevelopment)	c. 60,000	Chelsea	In June 2015 Chelsea unveiled plans to expand Stamford Bridge to a capacity of 60,000, however in January 2018, in spite of the local councils' approval of the £2bn development, plans were blocked due to objections of a single local resident, referencing light restrictions of the build; so the plans were shelved. Under new ownership though, Chelsea have continued to explore their options with regards to potential redevelopment, rebuilding or relocation to a new site; even going as far as to implement a task force to oversee the potential viability of these options. In October 2023 Chelsea completed an £80m purchase of the Sir Oswald Stoll Mansions adjacent to the ground, though any redevelopment works are still a long way off being rubber stamped.
Elland Road (redevelopment) (under construction)	c. 53,000	Leeds United	Leeds United's Elland Road expansion plans for a phased project to give the ground Uefa's elite status and retain unique atmosphere. This would mean it would become one of the top 10 stadiums in England should it be allowed, though this would depend on their chances of staying in the Premier League.
Villa Park (redevelopment)(under construction)	c. 50,000	Aston Villa	In January 2023, plans were approved by Birmingham City Council to redevelop Villa Park and the surrounding area, involving the demolition and rebuild of the North Stand, increasing capacity from 7,000 to 15,000 seats. In addition to this, the developments also included a hotel, museum and club store among other amendments in the surrounding area. The ground would see capacity increase to approximately 50,000. However, in January 2024, the proposals were officially shelved by the club, citing their desire to not reduce capacity in the time-span of the build, putting these proposals at risk. A reduced expansion of the stand, bringing overall to 48,909, was approved by the Birmingham City Council on 28 August 2025, with plans to increase stadium over 50,000 via other areas by 2028.
King Power Stadium (redevelopment)	c. 40,000	Leicester City	In September 2022, Leicester City Council approved initial plans for expansion of the King Power Stadium as well as wider developments of the land around the ground, including a fanzone, hotel, indoor arena and residential tower among other works. The plans were fully approved in December 2023 by LCC, however a date for when the development could break ground has yet to be confirmed, due to the project being subject to finance.
City Ground (redevelopment)	c. 35,000	Nottingham Forest	In February 2019 the club confirmed an extended lease on The City Ground. This extended lease meant the club was now able to proceed with plans to redevelop the stadium and surrounding area. Central to this redevelopment was the replacement of the Peter Taylor Stand with a new 10,000-seater stand, and improvements to the Trentside area, Brian Clough and Bridgford Stands. The club submitted plans for these developments of the ground, with the proposed capacity increase up to 38,000 after completion. A modified planning permission with 35,000 capacity was approved by the council in June 2025.
Selhurst Park (redevelopment)	c. 34,000	Crystal Palace	Plans for a new 13,500-seater Main Stand were approved by Croydon Council in April 2018 with plans even scheduled to commence as early as January 2019, however due to COVID-19 restrictions, the financial constraints this brought along and amendments to the initial proposal, the development has been delayed significantly. In October 2022 however, the revised plans were once again approved, though the club are still awaiting final approval before any work can commence.
Fratton Park (redevelopment)	c. 28,000	Portsmouth	Club is planning to rebuild the North stand of the venue to at least 15,000 seats, building over the adjacent cark park. The impact is still being estimated, but a below 30,000-seater venue is expected after completion.
Power Court Stadium (new build)(under construction)	c. 25,000	Luton Town	Plans had been first approved in January 2019 and then delayed multiple times. The latest permission was approved on 16 December 2024 for a 25,000-seater venue. Construction to begin in 2025 with a completion target for mid-2028.
Dean Court (redevelopment)	c. 20,500	Bournemouth	Plans submitted for deliberations were announced in July 2025. Demolishment of the South Stand and construction a new grandstand in its place with adjacent refurbishments of other seating areas are being proposed. For full control, Bournemouth acquired the stadium in April that year. A six-year timeline is expected for completion.
Edgeley Park (redevelopment)	c. 18,000	Stockport County	In August 2025, Stockport Council’s planning committee approved plans to expand stadium capacity by 7,400 seats bringing total capacity to 18,000 seats. Phase One will replace the East Stand (or Railway End) from the current uncovered 1,366-seat stand to an approximately 4,500-seats covered stand. This will make it similar to the existing West Stand (or Cheadle End) albeit with a slightly lower capacity. Plans for construction to start in 2023 have been delayed, with the club applying in July 2025 for permission to add temporary roofing to the Railway End. Phase Two will be to rebuild the South Stand (otherwise the Pop Side, Family Stand or Barlow Stand), increasing the stand's capacity from 2,411 to 6,500 seats. Phase Three relates to the Main Stand (the Danny Bergara Stand) and would expand the existing stand to the full length of the pitch. This would mean an increase in capacity from just over 2,000 to around 3,500 seats.
New Oxford United Stadium (new build)	c. 16,000	Oxford United	Proposed new stadium in Kidlington, Oxfordshire. Due to the lease agreement of Oxford's current ground the Kassam Stadium, expiring in 2026, the aim for completion of the new stadium is estimated for the start of the 2025–26 season. An agreement has been reached on heads of terms for Oxfordshire County Council to lease land near Oxford Parkway train station. Though plans are still in progress.
Northfleet Community Stadium (new build)	c. 8,000	Ebbsfleet United	Proposed new stadium as part of the wider regeneration of Northfleet Habourside. Plans were approved in April 2024 by Gravesham Borough Council, with works on the stadium scheduled to begin in September 2024 with an aim to be complete by August 2026, potentially in time for the beginning of the 2025–26 season.
Eco Park (new build)	c. 5,000	Forest Green Rovers	Proposed new stadium for Forest Green Rovers in Eastington, Gloucestershire. Designed by Zaha Hadid following a 2016 design competition, it is reputedly going to be the world's first timber stadium. Planning permission was approved by Stroud District Council in December 2019.
New Marine Stadium (new build)	5,000	Marine	Proposed new stadium, announced in February 2025.

== See also ==
- List of Premier League stadiums
- Development of stadiums in English football
- List of English rugby union stadiums by capacity
- List of English rugby league stadiums by capacity
- Record home attendances of English football clubs
- List of stadiums in the United Kingdom by capacity
- List of Scottish football stadiums by capacity
- List of football stadiums in Wales by capacity
- List of European stadiums by capacity
- List of association football stadiums by capacity
- List of association football stadiums by country
- List of sports venues by capacity
- Lists of stadiums
- Football in England
