= The 92 Club =

Association football groundhopping society

The Ninety-Two Club is a groundhopping society, in order to be a member of which a person must attend an association football game at the stadium of every current Premier League and EFL Championship, EFL League One, EFL League Two club in England and Wales.

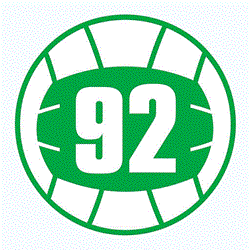
The logo of The Ninety-Two Club

The 'club' takes its name from the fact that there are 92 teams in the English professional league tier. The list of stadiums changes each year, as clubs are promoted and relegated in and out of the EFL, and other clubs move to new stadiums.

The Ninety-Two Club was founded in 1978 by Bristol Rovers F.C. supporter Gordon Pearce with 38 others.

== List of 92 Club Stadiums in 2026–27 season ==
=== Premier League ===
- Emirates Stadium (Arsenal)
- Villa Park (Aston Villa)
- Vitality Stadium (AFC Bournemouth)
- Gtech Community Stadium (Brentford)
- American Express Stadium (Brighton & Hove Albion)
- Stamford Bridge (Chelsea)
- Coventry Building Society Arena (Coventry City)
- Selhurst Park (Crystal Palace)
- Hill Dickinson Stadium (Everton)
- Craven Cottage (Fulham)
- MKM Stadium (Hull City)
- Portman Road (Ipswich Town)
- Elland Road (Leeds United)
- Anfield (Liverpool)
- Etihad Stadium (Manchester City)
- Old Trafford (Manchester United)
- St James' Park (Newcastle United)
- City Ground (Nottingham Forest)
- Stadium of Light (Sunderland)
- Tottenham Hotspur Stadium (Tottenham Hotspur)

=== EFL Championship ===
- St Andrew's (Birmingham City)
- Ewood Park (Blackburn Rovers)
- Toughsheet Community Stadium (Bolton Wanderers)
- Ashton Gate (Bristol City)
- Turf Moor (Burnley)
- Cardiff City Stadium (Cardiff City)
- The Valley (Charlton Athletic)
- Pride Park Stadium (Derby County)
- Sincil Bank (Lincoln City)
- Riverside Stadium (Middlesbrough)
- The Den (Millwall)
- Carrow Road (Norwich City)
- Fratton Park (Portsmouth)
- Deepdale (Preston North End)
- Loftus Road (Queens Park Rangers)
- Bramall Lane (Sheffield United)
- St Mary's Stadium (Southampton)
- Bet365 Stadium (Stoke City)
- Swansea.com Stadium (Swansea City)
- Vicarage Road (Watford)
- The Hawthorns (West Bromwich Albion)
- London Stadium (West Ham United)
- Molineux Stadium (Wolverhampton Wanderers)
- Racecourse Ground (Wrexham)

=== EFL League One ===
- Plough Lane (AFC Wimbledon)
- Oakwell (Barnsley)
- Bloomfield Road (Blackpool)
- Valley Parade (Bradford City)
- Copperjax Community Stadium (Bromley)
- Pirelli Stadium (Burton Albion)
- Abbey Stadium (Cambridge United)
- Eco-Power Stadium (Doncaster Rovers)
- Kirklees Stadium (Huddersfield Town)
- King Power Stadium (Leicester City)
- Brisbane Road (Leyton Orient)
- Kenilworth Road (Luton Town)
- Field Mill (Mansfield Town)
- Stadium MK (Milton Keynes Dons)
- Meadow Lane (Notts County)
- Kassam Stadium (Oxford United)
- London Road Stadium (Peterborough United)
- Home Park (Plymouth Argyle)
- Madejski Stadium (Reading)
- Hillsborough Stadium (Sheffield Wednesday)
- Broadhall Way (Stevenage)
- Edgeley Park (Stockport County)
- Brick Community Stadium (Wigan Athletic)
- Adams Park (Wycombe Wanderers)

=== EFL League Two ===
- Crown Ground (Accrington Stanley)
- The Hive Stadium (Barnet)
- Memorial Stadium (Bristol Rovers)
- Whaddon Road (Cheltenham Town)
- SMH Group Stadium (Chesterfield)
- Colchester Community Stadium (Colchester United)
- Broadfield Stadium (Crawley Town)
- Gresty Road (Crewe Alexandra)
- St James Park (Exeter City)
- Highbury Stadium (Fleetwood Town)
- Priestfield Stadium (Gillingham)
- Blundell Park (Grimsby Town)
- Rodney Parade (Newport County)
- Sixfields Stadium (Northampton Town)
- Boundary Park (Oldham Athletic)
- Vale Park (Port Vale)
- Spotland Stadium (Rochdale)
- New York Stadium (Rotherham United)
- Moor Lane (Salford City)
- New Meadow (Shrewsbury Town)
- County Ground (Swindon Town)
- Prenton Park (Tranmere Rovers)
- Bescot Stadium (Walsall)
- York Community Stadium (York City)

== See also ==
- Association football culture
- List of English football stadiums by capacity
- Groundhopping
