= List of Premier League stadiums =

Since the inception of the Premier League, England's highest level of association football annual league tournament, 63 football stadiums have been used to host matches. The inaugural round of Premier League matches took place on 15 August 1992 with eleven clubs hosting the opening fixtures. Following the Hillsborough Disaster in 1989, the Taylor Report recommended the abolition of standing terraces by the start of the 1994–95 season, to be replaced by all-seater stadiums. However, following Fulham's promotion from Division 1 in the 2000–01 season, terraces returned temporarily to the Premier League as The Football Association allowed the club extra time to complete renovations. The club were forced to play at Loftus Road after inadequate progress was made in converting Craven Cottage, but they returned to their home ground after building work was completed in time for the 2004–05 season.

Burnley's Turf Moor stadium became the 50th Premier League stadium when it hosted Burnley's first ever home Premier League fixture, against champions Manchester United, on 19 August 2009. The most recent venue to become a Premier League host is Coventry Building Society Arena, which hosted its first Premier League fixture in the 2026–27 season. Liverpool hold the record for most Premier League stadiums won at, having won at least once at 60 of the 62 grounds at which they've played.

== Stadiums ==
Stadiums listed in bold indicate that they are the home grounds of teams participating in the 2026–27 Premier League season, while those stadiums listed in italics have now been demolished.
For closed or demolished grounds, capacity is taken at closure.

Stadium	Image	Club	Location	Opened	Closed	Capacity	Pitch length (m)	Pitch width (m)	Coordinates	Ref.
**Anfield**	The Shankly Gates at Liverpool F.C.'s Anfield stadium	Liverpool	Liverpool	1884		61,276	101	68	53°25′51″N 002°57′39″W	
Arsenal Stadium (also known as Highbury)	Arsenal's former stadium at Highbury	Arsenal	London	1913	2006	38,419			51°33′28″N 000°06′10″W	
Ayresome Park		Middlesbrough	Middlesbrough	1903	1995	26,667			54°33′51″N 001°14′49″W	
Baseball Ground		Derby County	Derby	1892	2004	18,300			52°54′17″N 001°28′07″W	
bet365 Stadium Formerly Britannia Stadium		Stoke City	Stoke-on-Trent	1997		30,089			52°59′18″N 002°10′32″W	
Bloomfield Road	Blackpool's stadium, Bloomfield Road	Blackpool	Blackpool	1899		16,220			53°48′17″N 3°2′53″W	
Boleyn Ground (also known as Upton Park)	West Ham United's former Boleyn Ground from Green Street	West Ham United	London	1904	2016	35,345			51°31′55″N 000°02′22″E	
Boundary Park	Oldham Athletic's stadium, Boundary Park	Oldham Athletic	Oldham	1904		13,559			53°33′19″N 002°07′43″W	
Bramall Lane	Sheffield United's stadium, Bramall Lane	Sheffield United	Sheffield	1855		32,050	101	68	53°22′13″N 001°28′15″W	
**Brentford Community Stadium**		Brentford	London	2020		17,250	105	68	51°29′26.97″N 0°17′19.32″W	
Burnden Park	Bolton Wanderers' former stadium, Burnden Park	Bolton Wanderers	Bolton	1895	1997	22,616			53°34′08″N 002°24′58″W	
Cardiff City Stadium	Cardiff City's stadium, Cardiff City Stadium	Cardiff City	Cardiff	2009		33,280			51°28′22″N 003°12′11″W	
Carrow Road	Norwich City's Carrow Road stadium	Norwich City	Norwich	1935		27,359	105	68	52°37′20″N 001°18′33″E	
**City Ground**	Nottingham Forest's stadium, the City Ground	Nottingham Forest	Nottingham	1898		31,212	105	68	52°56′24″N 001°07′58″W	
County Ground	The Kingswood stand at the County Ground, Swindon Town F.C.'s stadium	Swindon Town	Swindon	1895		14,700			51°33′52″N 001°46′14″W	
**Coventry Building Society Arena**		Coventry City	Coventry	2005		32,609	105	68	52°26′53″N 1°29′44″W	
**Craven Cottage**	The cottage in the corner of Fulham's stadium, Craven Cottage	Fulham	London	1896		28,107	100	65	51°28′30″N 000°13′18″W	
**Dean Court**	Part of the Dean Court stadium	Bournemouth	Bournemouth	1910		12,357	105	68	50°44′07″N 1°50′18″W	
The Dell	Southampton's stadium, The Dell	Southampton	Southampton	1898	2001	15,200			50°54′53″N 001°24′47″W	
DW Stadium Formerly JJB Stadium	View of an evening match at Wigan Athletic's DW Stadium	Wigan Athletic	Wigan	1999		25,138			53°32′51″N 002°39′15″W	
**Elland Road**	Elland Road, Leeds United's stadium, East Stand to the right, South Stand to the left	Leeds United	Leeds	1897		37,633	105	68	53°46′40″N 001°34′20″W	
**Emirates Stadium**	Inside Arsenal's current stadium, the Emirates Stadium	Arsenal	London	2006		60,704	105	68	51°33′18″N 000°06′31″W	
**Etihad Stadium**		Manchester City	Manchester	2003		61,038	105	68	53°28′59″N 002°12′01″W	
Ewood Park	The Walker Steel stand at Ewood Park	Blackburn Rovers	Blackburn	1890		31,367			53°43′43″N 002°29′21″W	
**Falmer Stadium**		Brighton & Hove Albion	Falmer	2011		32,176	105	68	50°51′42.56″N 00°04′59.8″W	
Filbert Street	Inside Leicester City's stadium, Filbert Street	Leicester City	Leicester	1891	2002	22,000			52°37′25″N 001°08′26″W	
Fratton Park	The entrance to Portsmouth's stadium, Fratton Park	Portsmouth	Portsmouth	1899		20,978			50°47′47″N 001°03′50″W	
Goodison Park	Inside Goodison Park, Everton's stadium	Everton	Liverpool	1892		39,414	100.48	68	53°26′20″N 002°57′59″W	
The Hawthorns	Inside the stadium of West Bromwich Albion, The Hawthorns	West Bromwich Albion	West Bromwich	1900		26,445			52°30′33″N 001°57′50″W	
Highfield Road	An entrance to Coventry City's former stadium, Highfield Road	Coventry City	Coventry	1899	2005	23,489			52°24′43″N 001°29′24″W	
**Hill Dickinson Stadium**	Everton's current stadium, the Everton Stadium	Everton	Liverpool	2025		52,769	105	68	53°42′51″N 003°00′28″W	
Hillsborough Stadium	The South Stand at Sheffield Wednesday's Hillsborough Stadium	Sheffield Wednesday	Sheffield	1899		39,812			53°24′41″N 001°30′02″W	
Kenilworth Road		Luton Town	Luton	1905		12,056	100.6	65.8	51°53′03″N 0°25′54″W	
King Power Stadium Formerly Walkers Stadium	Leicester City's stadium, the King Power Stadium, from the inside	Leicester City	Leicester	2002		32,259	105	68	52°37′13″N 001°08′32″W	
Kirklees Stadium		Huddersfield Town	Huddersfield	1994		24,500			53°39′15″N 1°46′6″W	
Loftus Road	Inside view of Queens Park Ranger's stadium, Loftus Road	Queens Park Rangers & Fulham	London	1904		18,439			51°30′33″N 000°13′56″W	
London Stadium Formerly Olympic Stadium	Overhead view of London Stadium, home to West Ham United since 2016	West Ham United	London	2016		62,500	105	68	51°32′19″N 0°0′59″W	
Madejski Stadium	Inside Reading's Madejski Stadium	Reading	Reading	1998		24,161			51°25′20″N 000°58′58″W	
Maine Road	Inside Maine Road, Manchester City's former stadium	Manchester City	Manchester	1923	2003	35,150			53°27′04″N 002°14′07″W	
**MKM Stadium** Formerly KCOM Stadium	Outside view of Hull City's KC Stadium	Hull City	Kingston upon Hull	2002		24,983	104.8	67.2	53°44′46″N 000°22′03″W	
Molineux Stadium	Wolverhampton Wanderers' Molineux Stadium from inside	Wolverhampton Wanderers	Wolverhampton	1889		31,750	105	68	52°35′25″N 002°07′49″W	
Oakwell	The North Stand of Barnsley F.C.'s Oakwell stadium	Barnsley	Barnsley	1887		23,009			53°33′08″N 001°28′03″W	
**Old Trafford**	The East Stand of Manchester United's stadium Old Trafford	Manchester United	Manchester	1910		74,158	105	68	53°27′47″N 002°17′29″W	
**Portman Road**	The Cobbold Stand at Ipswich Town's Portman Road stadium	Ipswich Town	Ipswich	1884		30,294	105	66	52°03′18″N 001°08′41″E	
Pride Park Stadium		Derby County	Derby	1997		33,597			52°54′54″N 001°26′50″W	
Riverside Stadium	Middlesbrough's Riverside Stadium	Middlesbrough	Middlesbrough	1995		33,746			54°34′42″N 001°13′01″W	
Roker Park	Sunderland's former stadium, Roker Park, in 1976	Sunderland	Sunderland	1898	1997	22,500			54°55′17″N 001°22′32″W	
St Andrew's	The Tilton Road End of Birmingham City's St Andrew's stadium	Birmingham City	Birmingham	1906		30,079			52°28′33″N 001°52′05″W	
**St James' Park**	Inside Newcastle United's stadium, St James' Park	Newcastle United	Newcastle upon Tyne	1880		52,729	105	68	54°58′32″N 001°37′18″W	
St Mary's Stadium	View of the Northam Stand inside St Mary's Stadium, Southampton's ground	Southampton	Southampton	2001		32,384	105	68	50°54′21″N 001°23′28″W	
**Selhurst Park**	Selhurst Park	Crystal Palace; Wimbledon	London	1924		25,194	101.5	68	51°23′54″N 000°05′08″W	
**Stadium of Light**	North Stand of Sunderland's Stadium of Light	Sunderland	Sunderland	1997		48,095	105	68	54°54′52″N 001°23′18″W	
**Stamford Bridge**		Chelsea	London	1877		40,044	103	67.5	51°28′54″N 000°11′28″W	
Swansea.com Stadium Formerly Liberty Stadium	Outside view of Swansea City's Liberty Stadium	Swansea City	Swansea	2005		20,937			51°38′34″N 3°56′5″W	
**Tottenham Hotspur Stadium**		Tottenham Hotspur	London	2019		62,850	105	68	51°36′17″N 000°03′59″W	
Toughsheet Community Stadium Formerly Reebok Stadium	Bolton Wanderer's Reebok Stadium during an evening match in 2006	Bolton Wanderers	Bolton	1997		28,723			53°34′50″N 002°32′08″W	
Turf Moor	The James Hargreaves stand at Burnley's Turf Moor stadium	Burnley	Burnley	1883		21,990	105	68	53°47′21″N 2°13′49″W	
The Valley	Aerial view of The Valley, Charlton Athletic's stadium	Charlton Athletic	London	1919		27,111			51°29′11″N 000°02′11″E	
Valley Parade	Valley Parade	Bradford City	Bradford	1886		25,136			53°48′15″N 001°45′32″W	
Vicarage Road	The Rookery at Watford's stadium, Vicarage Road	Watford	Watford	1922		22,200	105	68	51°39′00″N 000°24′06″W	
**Villa Park**	Aerial view of Villa Park	Aston Villa	Birmingham	1897		36,887	105	68	52°30′33″N 001°53′05″W	
Wembley Stadium		—N/a (Note: Wembley Stadium is not a football club home ground. However, Tottenham Hotspur played their designated home matches at Wembley throughout the 2017–18 season and most of 2018–19 while their new stadium was under construction.)	London	2007		90,000			51°33′21″N 0°16′47″W	
White Hart Lane	Aerial photograph of Tottenham Hotspur's stadium, White Hart Lane	Tottenham Hotspur	London	1899	2017	36,284			51°36′12″N 000°03′57″W	

Footnotes

== See also ==
- Record home attendances of English football clubs
- List of English football stadiums by capacity
- List of association football stadiums by country
