= List of stadiums in Wales by capacity =

The following is a list of stadiums in Wales, in order by capacity. The list only includes stadiums and grounds that have been built and remain in use, with a capacity of at least 2,000 temporary seating included. The ground of successful Welsh club The New Saints is not included because it is in England, not Wales (Park Hall).

== Current stadiums ==
#	Image	Stadium	Capacity	City	Home team(s)	Sport(s)	UEFA rank
1		Principality Stadium	73,931	Cardiff	Wales national rugby union team	Rugby Union	4/4 stars
2		Cardiff City Stadium	33,280	Cardiff	Cardiff City, Wales national football team	Football	4/4 stars
3		Swansea.com Stadium	21,000	Swansea	Swansea City	Football	4/4 stars
4		Sophia Gardens	16,000	Cardiff	Glamorgan County Cricket Club, Welsh Fire	Cricket	
5		Parc y Scarlets	14,000	Llanelli	Llanelli RFC, Scarlets	Rugby Union	
6		Cardiff Arms Park	12,125	Cardiff	Cardiff Rugby, Cardiff RFC	Rugby Union	
7		STōK CaeRas (Racecourse Ground)	10,771	Wrexham	Wrexham	Football	

== Capacity below 10,000 ==
Stadium	Capacity	City	Sport(s)
Pontypool Park	8,800	Pontypool	Rugby union
Rodney Parade	8,700	Newport	Rugby union, football
Dunraven Brewery Field	8,000	Bridgend	Rugby union
Eugene Cross Park	8,000	Ebbw Vale	Rugby union, cricket
Talbot Athletic Ground	8,000	Port Talbot	Rugby union
Sardis Road	7,861	Pontypridd	Rugby union
The Gnoll	6,000	Neath	Rugby union Used to hold cricket
Virginia Park	6,000	Caerphilly	Rugby union
Deva Stadium	5,500	Sealand	Football
The Wern	4,500	Merthyr Tydfil	Rugby union
St Helen's Ground	4,500 (Expected 8,396)	Swansea	Rugby union Used to hold cricket
Lido Ground	4,200	Aberavon	Football
Penydarren Park	4,000	Merthyr Tydfil	Football
Royal Welsh Showground	4,000	Llanelwedd	Show jumping
Newport Stadium	3,246	Newport	Football, athletics, Rugby union
Vindico Arena	3,088	Cardiff	Ice hockey
Church Bank Playing Fields	3,000	Llandovery	Rugby union
Pandy Park	3,000	Crosskeys	Rugby union
Rhiw'r Ddar Stadium	3,000	Taffs Well	Football
Jenner Park Stadium	2,650	Barry	Football
Eirias Stadium	2,580	Colwyn Bay	Rugby league, Rugby union, athletics
Cardiff International Sports Stadium	2,553	Cardiff	Athletics, Rugby union, football
Bargoed Park	2,500	Bargoed	Rugby union, cricket
Cwmbran Stadium	2,200	Llantarnam	Athletics, football

== Notable former stadiums ==
Stadium	Capacity
National Stadium, Cardiff	47,500
Ninian Park, Cardiff	21,508
Vetch Field, Swansea	11,475
Stradey Park, Llanelli	10,800

== See also ==
- List of football clubs in Wales
- List of football stadiums in England
- List of football stadiums in Scotland
- List of association football stadiums by capacity
- List of British stadiums by capacity
- List of European stadiums by capacity
- Lists of stadiums
