= Groundhopping =

Visiting as many sports stadiums as possible

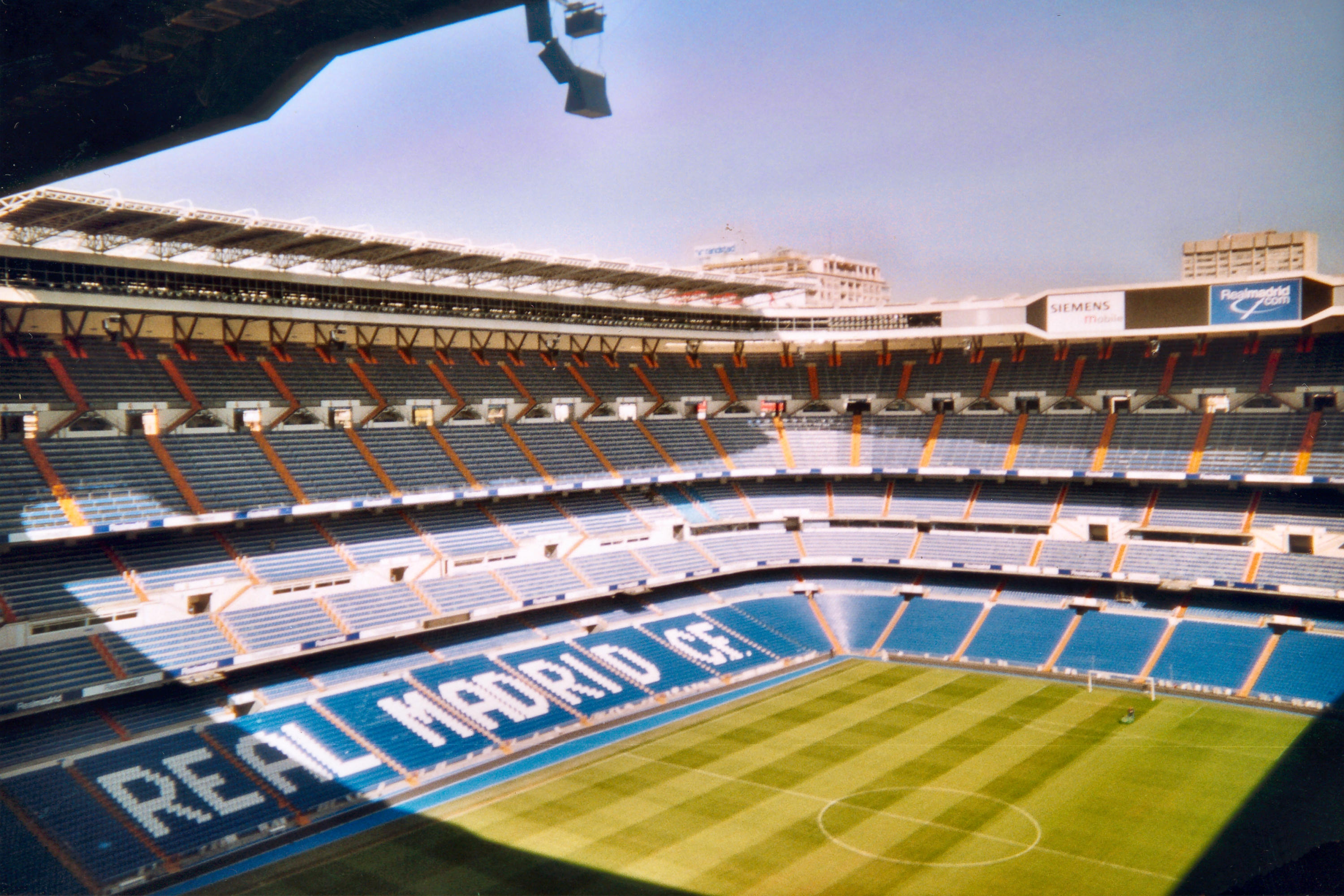
Generally, groundhoppers are football fans who usually have a neutral opinion regarding football clubs

Groundhopping is a hobby that involves attending sports matches at as many different stadiums or grounds as possible. Participants are known as groundhoppers, hoppers or travellers. Groundhopping is largely a football-related pastime. Generally, groundhoppers are football fans who usually have a neutral opinion regarding football clubs and try to attend as many football games in as many football stadiums or venues as possible, seeing the whole process as a leisure activity.

== History ==
The term 'groundhopping' originates from the late 1980s. From the late 1980s fans in Germany started groundhopping as well. Currently it is especially popular in the United Kingdom, Germany, the Netherlands, Belgium, Sweden and Norway.

The 92 club, a group for fans who have visited all 92 current English professional league grounds, was founded in 1978 by Gordon Pearce with 38 others.

== Organisation ==
Generally, groundhopping is not officially organised. However, there are some formal organisations for groundhoppers, including The 92 Club in England, which consists of groundhoppers who have visited matches in all stadiums of the Premier and Football League. With this there are also (mostly) charity based races to see the fastest speed to reach the 92 Football League Stadia (initially being called 92 Grounds in 92 Hours), currently set at 72 hours by four fans of Swindon Town in 2015.

Groundhoppers usually organize themselves as a group of friends or through online forums or social media (e.g. Facebook and Twitter) in particular. Other groundhoppers do not organise with others at all and visit grounds alone by themselves.

Enthusiasts of the hobby sometimes use apps such as Futbology, Europlan or Groundhoppers to track their progress. Notable users are "Dressmann" with 258 verified matches attended and "Anders Riste" with 248 matches. The Europlan website also acts as the digital mouthpiece of the Association of Groundhoppers in Germany (German: Vereinigung der Groundhopper Deutschlands; V.d.G.D.)

Among Asia’s most notable groundhoppers on the Futbology platform are Chin Heng Tan, Jason Goo, and Chris Abroad. Chin Heng Tan, a Singaporean ground hopper has verified attendance at 196 matches, while Jason Goo, a Malaysian ground hopper has reached an impressive 415 verified matches. Leading the trio is Chris Abroad, a German football traveller with 551 verified matches recorded. Through extensive journeys across Asia, Chris has become well known within the regional groundhopping community and has publicly expressed his support for Selangor FC. Their achievements highlight the growing popularity of football groundhopping and stadium tourism throughout Asia.

=== Futbology ===
Futbology is a football focused mobile app designed for supporters who enjoy attending matches and tracking their football journeys. The owner and co-founder of Futbology is Lars Erik Bolstad from Norway. He created the app together with Geir Florhaug. The project began in 2011 under the name Groundhopper, before being rebranded to Futbology. Their idea was simple: football fans needed a way to record matches attended, stadiums visited, and discover new games around the world The platform allows users to record matches they have attended, check in at stadiums, discover nearby fixtures, and build a personal history of football experiences. Founded in Norway, Futbology has become popular among groundhoppers and football fans worldwide because of its extensive database of leagues, clubs, and stadiums. The app covers more than 1,500 leagues and tournaments and includes over 100,000 football grounds around the world. Users can collect badges for milestones, view detailed statistics about their match attendance, and connect with friends who also use the platform. Premium features include access to nearby fixtures, historical results, and enhanced tracking tools. Futbology is particularly valued by supporters who travel to watch football and want to maintain a record of every club, stadium, and competition they have experienced. The app continues to expand its coverage and regularly adds new clubs, grounds, and competitions. Its goal is to make football attendance more enjoyable while helping fans discover matches wherever they are. Today, Futbology is widely regarded as one of the leading apps for football groundhoppers and match-going supporters worldwide.

== Expand to Asia ==
The expansion into Asia also includes football visits across countries such as Thailand, Malaysia, Japan, South Korea, Vietnam, and Singapore, creating new opportunities for supporters to discover different football traditions, atmospheres, and communities throughout the region.

== Rules ==
There is no universal set or rules for counting ‘hopped grounds’, although an unwritten rule is that a groundhopper must have seen a full football match at the ground.

== See also ==
- Association football culture
- The 92 Club
