= Leazes Park Stadium =

Planned football stadium in Newcastle upon Tyne, England

- Interactive map of Leazes Park Stadium
- Location: Leazes Park, Newcastle upon Tyne, England
- Coordinates: 54.977°N 1.623°W
- Owner: Newcastle United F.C.
- Operator: Newcastle United F.C.
- Capacity: 65,000

Construction
- Opened: 2031 (planned)
- Cost: £1.2bn (estimated)

Tenant
- Newcastle United (planned)

Leazes Park Stadium is a proposed multi-purpose stadium to be built in Leazes Park, Newcastle upon Tyne. It would become the new home of Premier League club Newcastle United, replacing the club's current stadium, St James' Park, where they have played since 1892.

== Planning ==
Following the takeover of Newcastle United by the Saudi Public Investment Fund (PIF) in October 2021, plans to either expand St James' Park or move to a completely new stadium have been discussed.

In March 2025, it was announced that if the new "super stadium" was to be built, it would not impact the use of St James' Park as a host venue for UEFA Euro 2028.

On 3 May 2025, Chi Onwurah, the Labour MP for Newcastle upon Tyne Central and West, made clear her feeling that Newcastle should remain at St James' Park. Despite this, she did admit that if the club were to move, it should be to a site still within the city centre, which aligns with the Leazes Park proposal.

As of November 2025, Newcastle City Council is still yet to receive any planning applications relating to a new stadium in Leazes Park.

== Controversy ==
In March 2025, Save Newcastle Wildlife warned that building a stadium on Leazes Park could negatively impact the environment and destroy animal habitats. The following month, an online petition reached 11,000 signatures in an attempt to stop the park from being used as the site for a possible new stadium. By June 2025, this figure had risen to 28,000 signatures and caught the attention of many local politicians.
