= Swansea.com Stadium =

Multiuse venue in Swansea, Wales

- Stadiwm Swansea.com (Welsh)
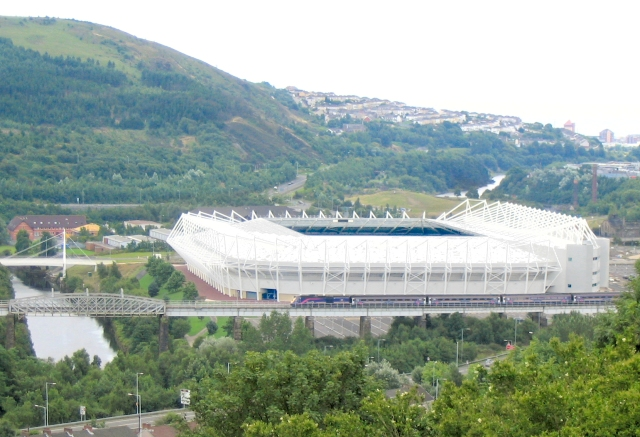
- UEFA

- Location within Swansea
- Former names: White Rock Stadium (2004, under construction); New Stadium Swansea (2005, official); Liberty Stadium (2005–2021)
- Location: Normandy Road, Swansea, Wales
- Coordinates: 51.6422°N 3.9351°W
- Owner: City and County of Swansea Council
- Operator: StadCo
- Capacity: 21,088
- Surface: Desso GrassMaster
- Record attendance: 20,973 (Swansea City vs West Ham , Sky Bet Championship, 17 October 2026)
- Field size: 105 x 68 metres (115 x 74 yards)
- Public transit: The New Mex bus stop Swansea

Construction
- Groundbreaking: 2003
- Opened: 10 July 2005
- Cost: £27 million
- Architects: TTH Architects, Gateshead UK

Tenants
- Swansea City (2005–present); Ospreys (2005–2025); Wales national football team (selected matches)

The Swansea.com Stadium (Welsh: Stadiwm Swansea.com; formerly Liberty Stadium) is an all-seated multi-use sports stadium and conferencing venue located in the Landore area of Swansea, Wales, hosting both rugby union and football. The stadium opened in 2005 and was named the Liberty Stadium. It had an opening capacity of 20,750, making it the largest purpose-built venue in Swansea; minor layout changes have since increased this to 21,088.

It is the home stadium of EFL Championship club Swansea City, who took full operational control of the stadium in 2018. As a result of Swansea City's promotion in 2011, the stadium became the first Premier League ground in Wales. It is the third largest stadium in Wales – after the Millennium Stadium and the Cardiff City Stadium. In European competitions, the stadium is known as Swansea Stadium due to advertising rules.

== History ==
With Swansea City's Vetch Field, and Ospreys' St Helen's and The Gnoll no longer being up-to-date venues to play at, and both the Swans and the Ospreys not having the necessary capital to invest into a new stadium, Swansea council and a developer-led consortia submitted a proposal for a sustainable 'bowl' venue for 20,520 seats on a site to the west of the River Tawe on the site of the Morfa Stadium, an athletics stadium owned by the City and County of Swansea council. It was funded by a 355,000 ft retail park on land to the east of the river. The final value of the development was in excess of £50m.

On 10 July 2005, the stadium was opened and became the home to Swansea City and Ospreys. On 23 July 2005, it was officially opened as Swansea City faced Fulham, (then managed by former Swansea player Chris Coleman) in a friendly match. The match ended in a 1–1 draw with the first goal being scored by Fulham's Steed Malbranque. Swansea's Marc Goodfellow scored during the game to level the match. The first league game was held on 6 August, with Swansea defeating Tranmere Rovers through a single goal by debutant Adebayo Akinfenwa.

Before a league match between Swansea City and Oldham Athletic in October 2005, a statue of Ivor Allchurch (1929–1997) was unveiled to commemorate the Swansea-born star who during two spells for the club scored a record 164 goals in 445 appearances.

The first capacity crowd recorded at Liberty Stadium was on 1 November 2006 when The Ospreys beat Australia A 24–16. The stadium has hosted multiple Wales football internationals, listed below.

Seating at Liberty Stadium is often sold out during Swansea City football matches. Swansea City have expressed a desire to have the capacity of the stadium increased and have held talks with Swansea Council during the 2011–2012 season for the future expansion of the Liberty Stadium which would be completed in a number of phases beginning with expansion or redevelopment of the east stand. Plans for a new McDonald's fast food restaurant to be opened near the stadium threw expansion plans into doubt. However, the planning application was withdrawn.

In December 2013, it was reported by BBC News that the European Commission had requested details of the funding of the stadium, as part of a wider inquiry into state aid for sports clubs.

At the start of the 2014–15 Premier League season, a number of changes were made to the stadium. These included two new 'Jumbotron' screens inside the north and south stands, measuring approximately 200 inches. Due to sponsorship by LG all televisions in food outlets and concourse were replaced by 50" LG TV screens and the south stand renamed The LG Stand. New advertising boards with a crowd facing side were also added.

Expansions planned would expand the stadium to 33,000, with another expansion upgrading the stadium to above the 40,000 mark. This would make Wales national football matches a possibility.

In July 2018, Swansea City took full ownership of the stadium, after reaching an agreement with Swansea City Council. It was agreed that the Ospreys could continue to share the stadium. In the summer of 2024, the Ospreys announced that they would be returning to the St Helen's ground, ending their 20 year tenure at the stadium. They were due to relocate at the start of the 2025–26, but due to ongoing redevelopment they played at Bridgend's Brewery Field.

== Naming ==
The logo of Liberty Stadium.

During its construction, a variety of names were suggested for it: most commonly used was "White Rock" stadium (after the copper works of the same name which existed on the site historically). However "White Rock" was only used as a temporary name during its construction and when work was finished, the name was dropped and the stadium owners began looking for sponsors for the stadium. While sponsors were being searched for, it was called "New Stadium Swansea". On 18 October 2005, Swansea-based developers Liberty Properties Plc won the naming rights to call it "Liberty Stadium". In UEFA matches, it is called Swansea Stadium due to UEFA regulations on sponsorship.

On 8 May 2015, for one night only, the stadium was renamed The Katie Phillips Stadium, after an Ospreys supporter chosen at random. On 9 August 2021, the stadium was renamed the Swansea.com stadium following a 10-year contract being agreed with Swansea.com, a business which shares director Martin Morgan with Swansea City.

== International fixtures ==
The ground has also hosted nine Wales international football fixtures. The first was the first Wales match in Swansea for 17 years, and saw local player John Hartson captain the team for the first time, in a goalless draw against Slovenia. The first competitive game and first victory was a 2–0 win over Switzerland in UEFA Euro 2012 qualification on 7 October 2011. The most recent game was a 0–1 loss against the Canada on 9 September 2025, the first Wales game at the venue for five years.

The results were as follows:

Date	Type	Opponents	Final score
17 August 2005	Friendly	Slovenia	0–0
15 August 2006	Friendly	Bulgaria	0–0
20 August 2008	Friendly	Georgia	1–2
3 March 2010	Friendly	Sweden	0–1
7 October 2011	UEFA Euro 2012 qualifier	Switzerland	2–0
6 February 2013	Friendly	Austria	2–1
26 March 2013	2014 FIFA World Cup qualifier	Croatia	1–2
12 November 2020	Friendly	United States	0–0
9 September 2025	Friendly	Canada	0–1

== Other uses ==
=== Concerts ===
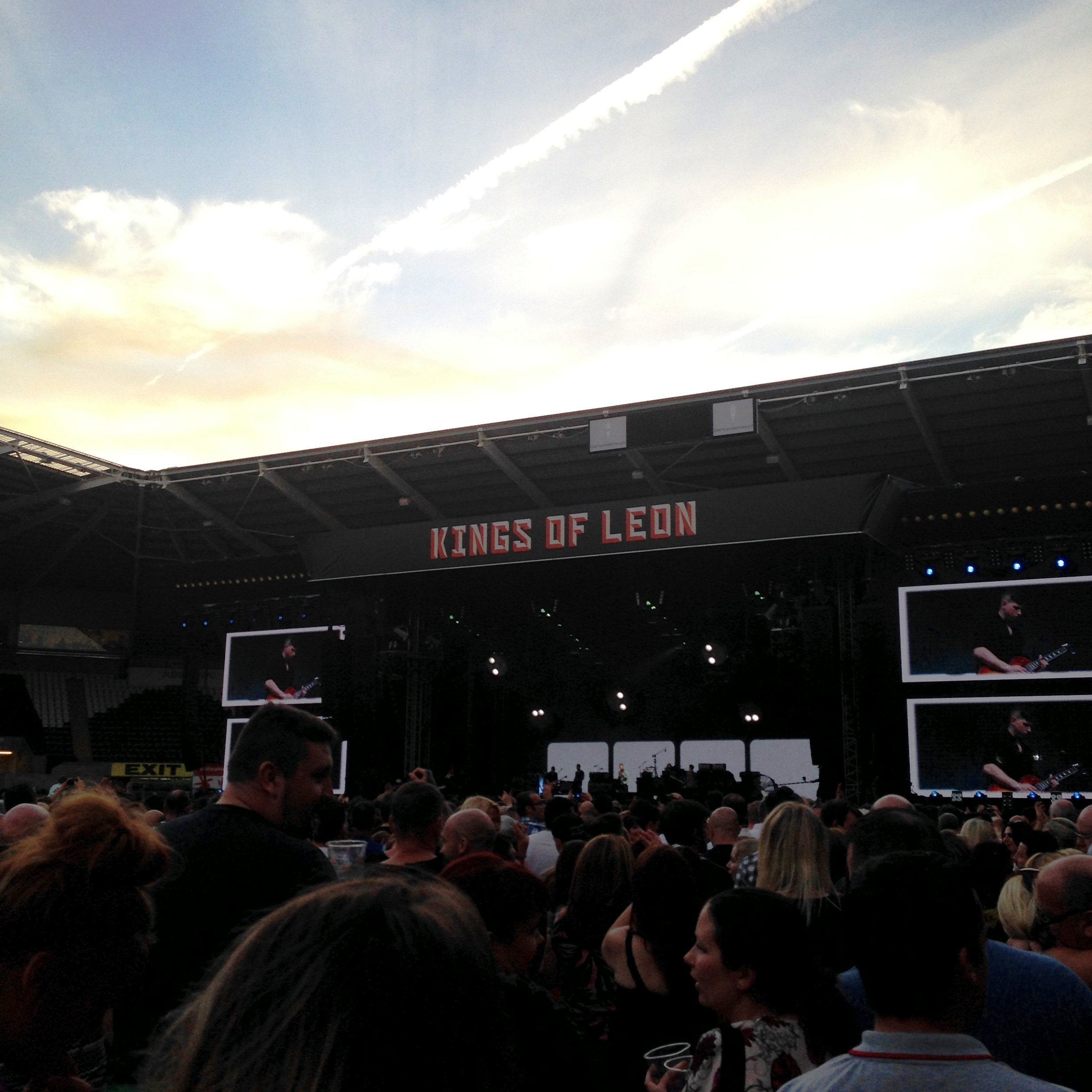
Kings of Leon performing at the stadium

Date	Artist
1 June 2007	The Who
29 June 2008	Elton John
23 June 2010	Pink
1 June 2011	Rod Stewart
12 June 2011	JLS
2 July 2014	Kings of Leon
28 May 2016	Manic Street Preachers
18 June 2016	Lionel Richie
14 June 2017	Take That
23 June 2018	The Killers
7 July 2018	Little Mix
29 June 2022	Elton John
12 June 2023	Arctic Monkeys
6 June 2024	Take That

=== Politics ===
In April 2014, the stadium held a UK Independence Party conference.

== Statistics and average attendances ==
- Stadium capacity: 21,088
- Record attendance: 20,973 vs West Ham United, 16th October 2026
- First international game held: Wales v Slovenia, 17 August 2005.

Average attendances are for home league matches only.

Note: During the 2025-26 season, the Ospreys moved to the Brewery Field and in the 2026-27 season they stayed at St Helen's Ground.

Season	Swansea City	Ospreys
2005–06	17,960	8,567
2006–07	18,008	9,147
2007–08	16,906	9,487
2008–09	17,509	9,063
2009–10	15,407	8,284
2010–11	15,507	8,855
2011–12	19,946	7,259
2012–13	20,370	9,272
2013–14	20,407	7,936
2014–15	20,555	8,398
2015–16	20,711	8,474
2016–17	20,619	9,026
2017–18	20,879	6,994
2018–19	18,444	6,812
2019-20	15,405	5,834
2020–21	NA	NA
2021–22	17,389	6,131
2022–23	16,821	5,800
2023–24	16,586	4,892
2024–25	15,499	4,192
Season	Swansea City	
2025-26	16,029	

== Gallery ==
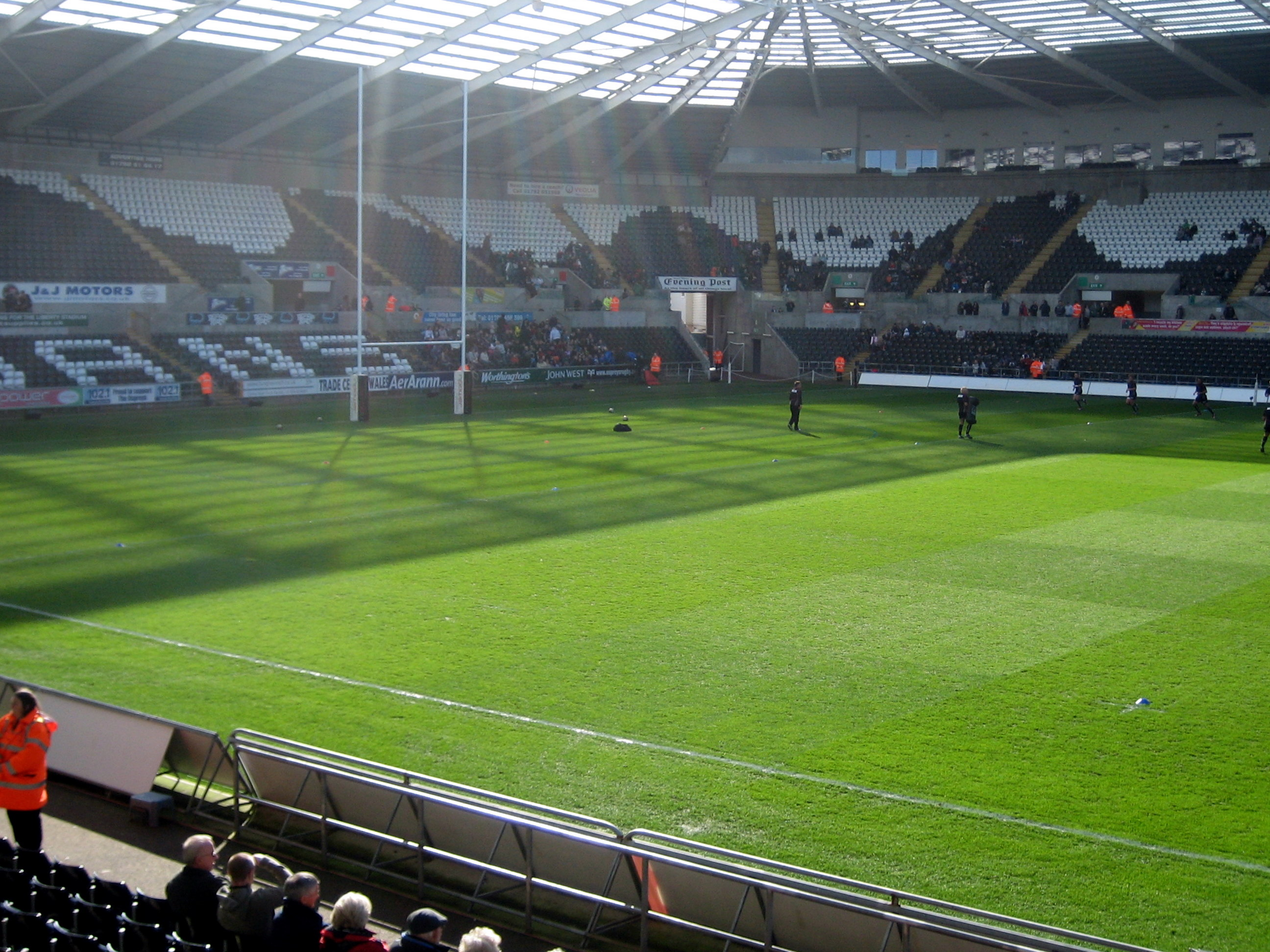

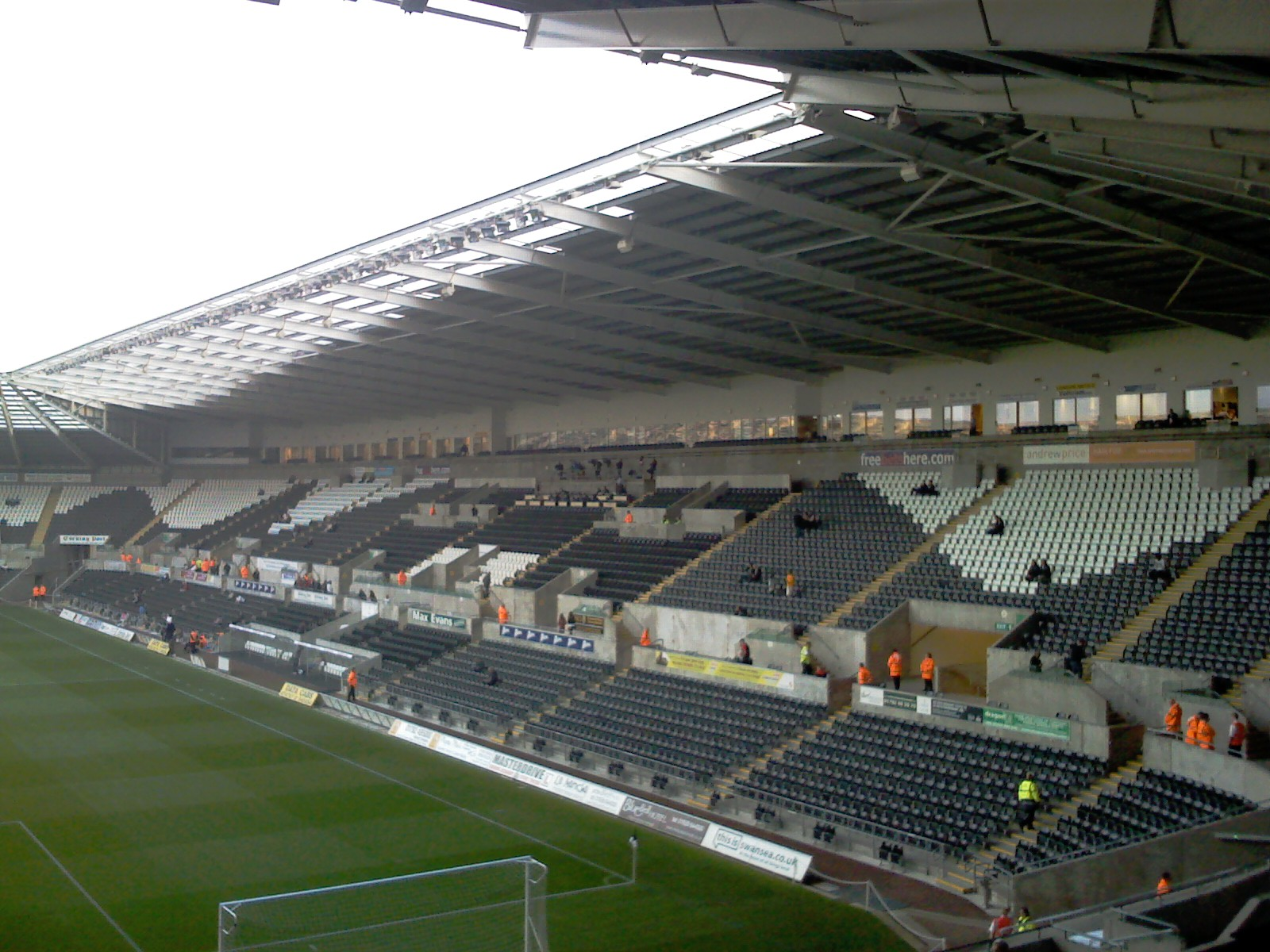

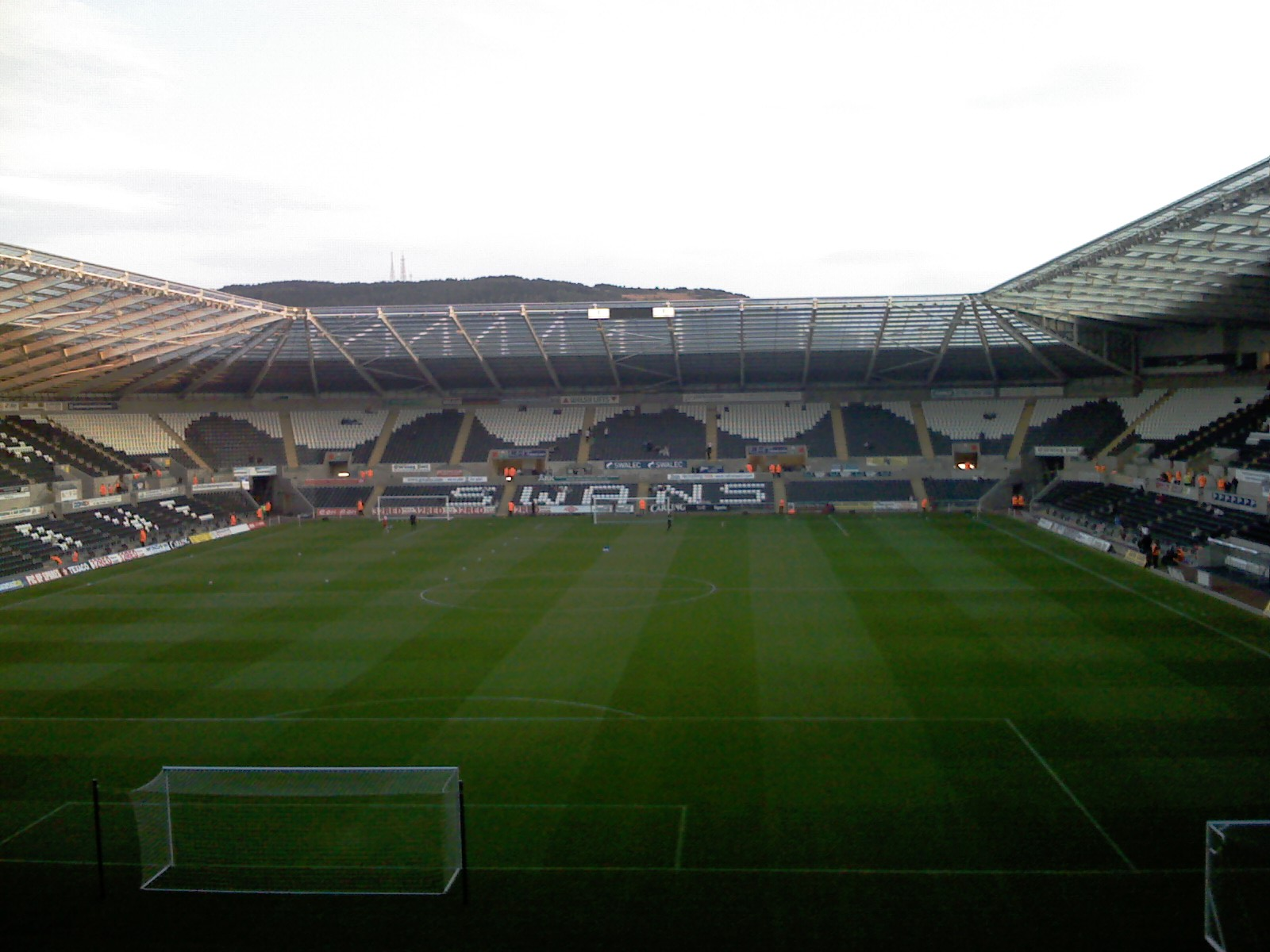

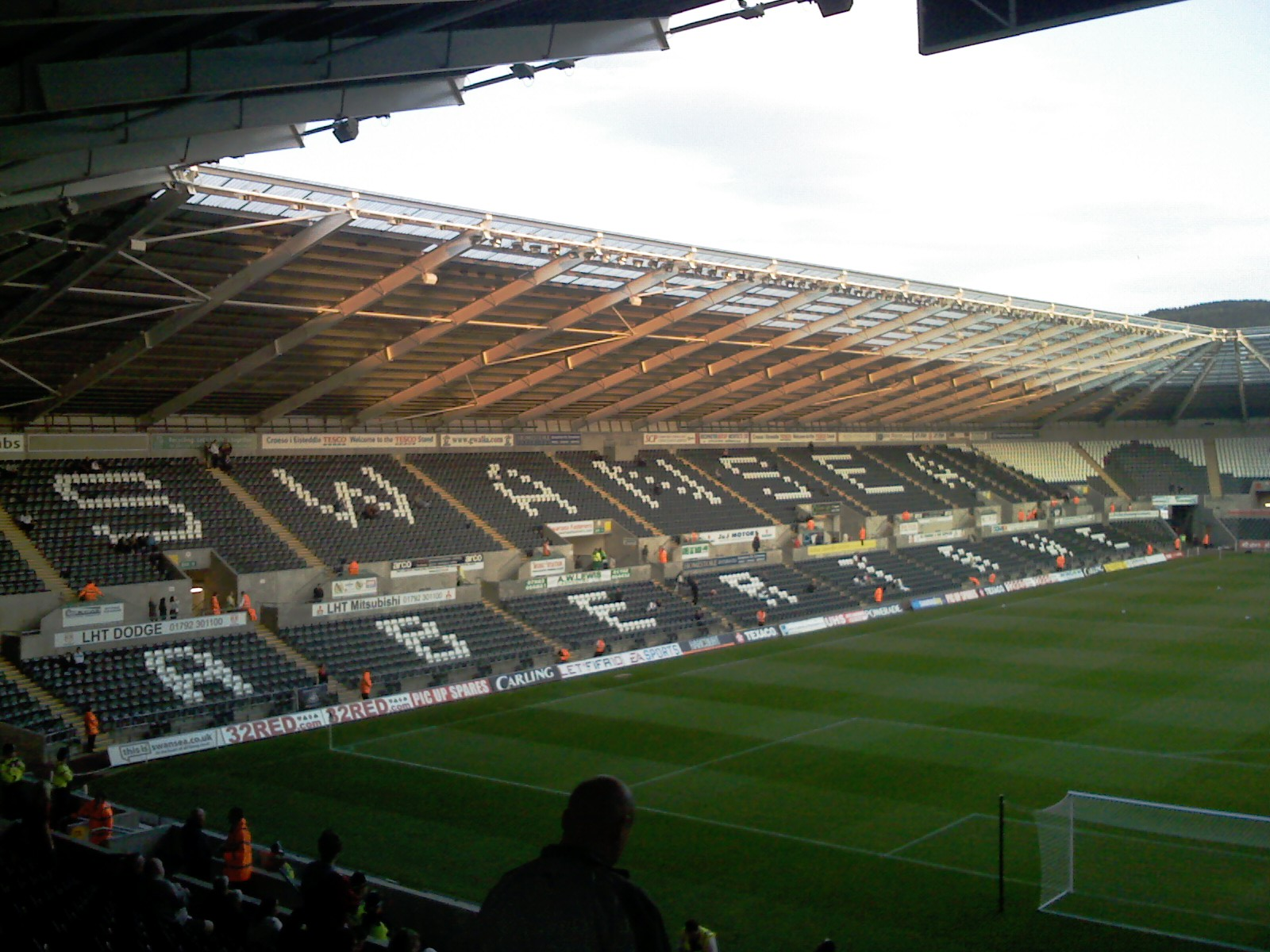

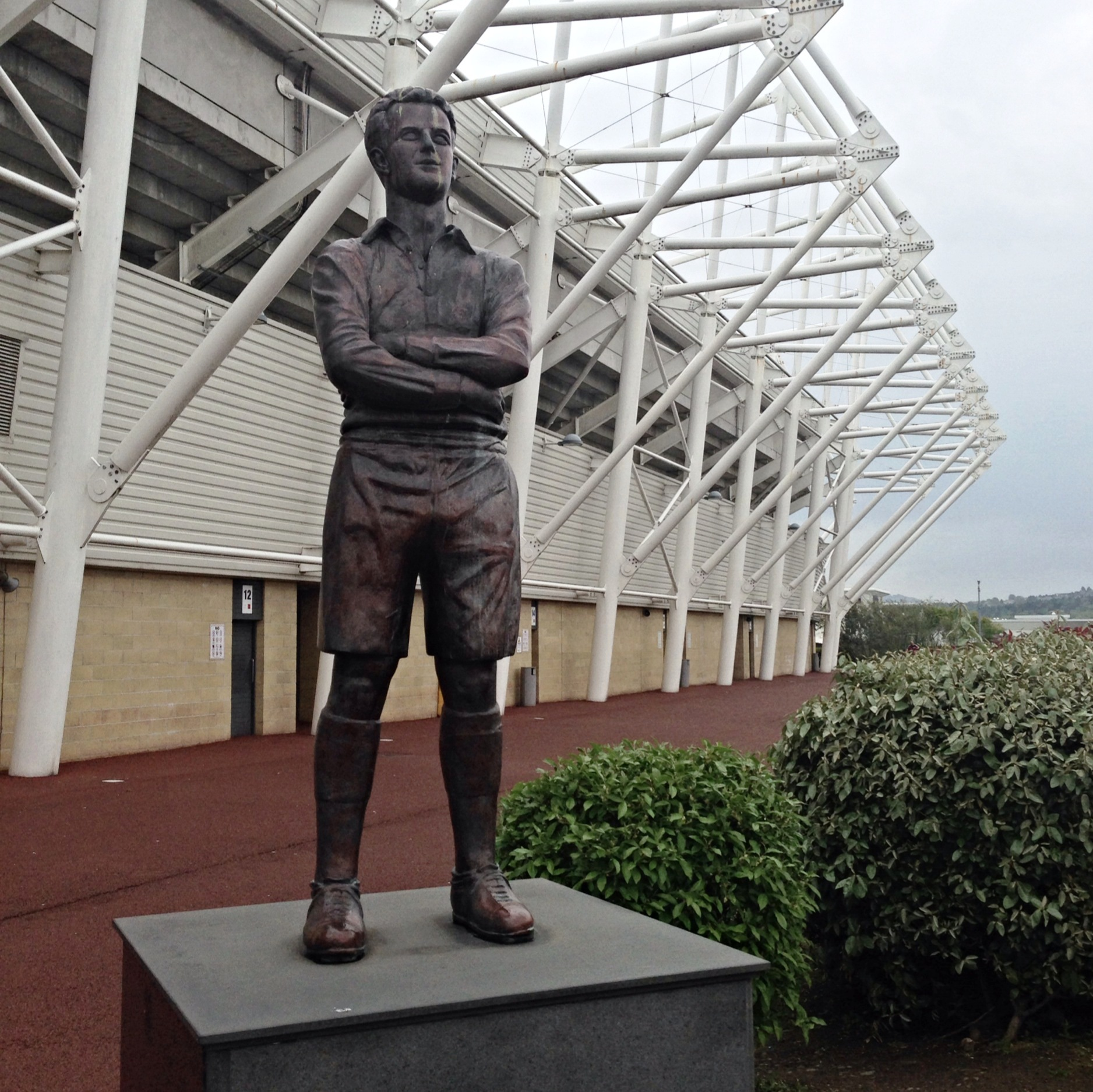

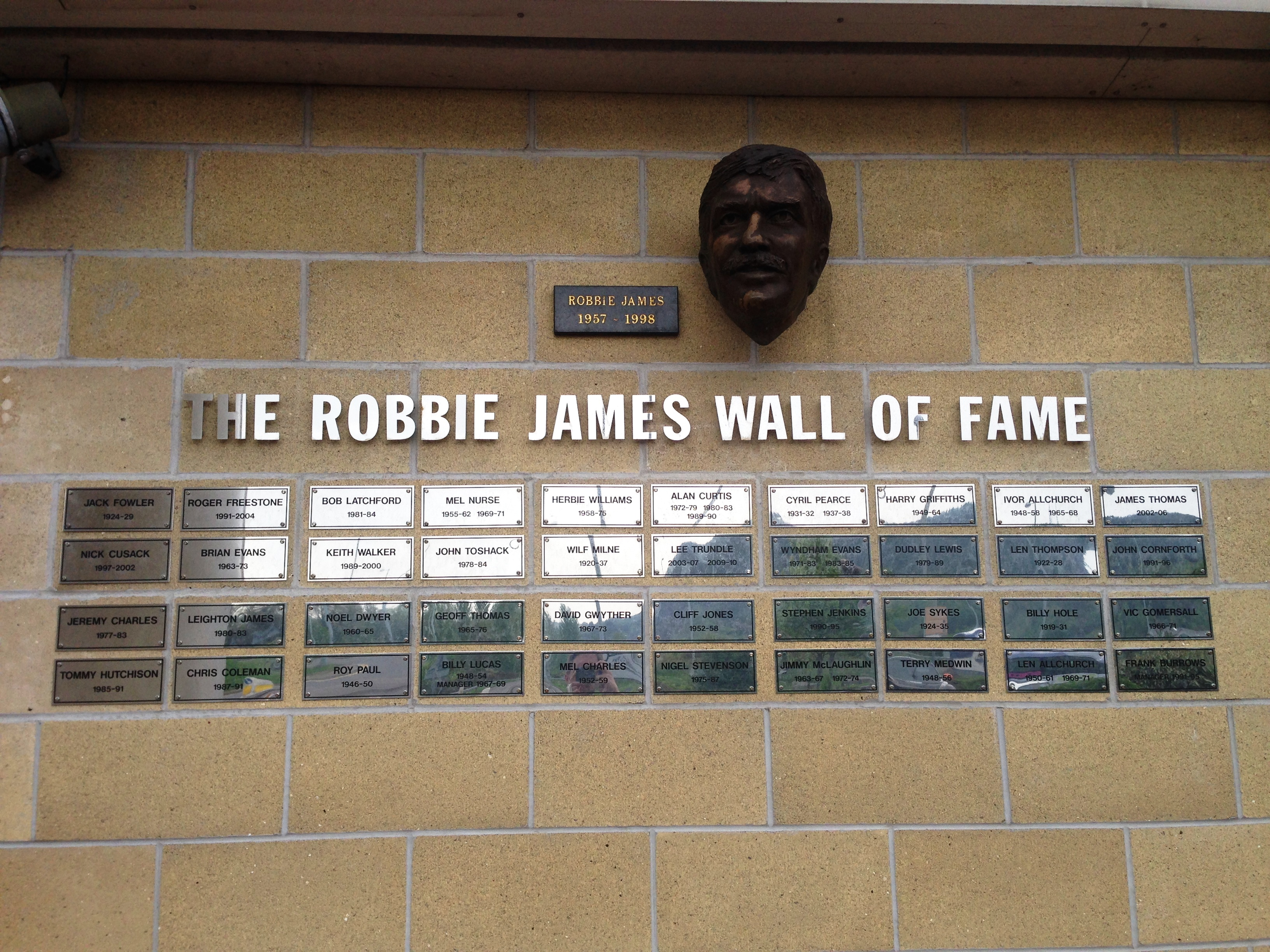

== See also ==
- List of stadiums in Wales by capacity
- List of Premier League stadiums
- List of football stadiums in England
