= All In London =

All In London is a promotional name that has been used by All Elite Wrestling (AEW) for their biggest professional wrestling event, All In, when held in London, England.

It may refer to:

- All In (2023), a 2023 event.
- All In (2024), a 2024 event.
- All In (2026), a 2026 event.
