= List of European stadiums by capacity =

This is a list of the largest stadiums in European countries. Stadiums with a capacity of 30,000 or more are included.

They are ordered by their audience capacity. The capacity figures are for each stadium's permanent total seating capacity.

== Current stadiums: capacity of 30,000 or more ==
Notes:

(cl) indicates due to a renovation or other reason currently unusable seating, (d) indicates retractable seating deployed, (nd) indicates retractable seating not deployed, (m) indicates movable seating deployed, (t) indicates capacity with temporary seats to be removed

An asterisk – * – indicates that a team does not play all of its home matches at that venue.

The "Category" column indicates whether the stadium has been designated by UEFA as capable of hosting club competitions such as the UEFA Champions League, UEFA Europa League and UEFA Conference League, and national team competitions such as the UEFA European Championship, UEFA Women's Championship and the UEFA Nations League, as well as hosting the FIFA World Cup in Europe. Since 22 May 2023, finals from 2026 onward will only be able to be staged in the Category 4 stadiums with a capacity of over:

- 70,000 for the UEFA Champions League.
- 60,000 for the UEFA Euro.
- 40,000 for the UEFA Europa League.
- 30,000 for the UEFA Conference League, the UEFA Women's Champions League and the UEFA Nations League.
- 20,000 for the UEFA Women's Euro and the UEFA Super Cup.

=== Capacity above 80,000 ===
Rank	Name	Capacity	City	Country	Tenants/notes	Built	UEFA category	Images
1	Camp Nou	99,354	Barcelona	Spain	Barcelona, Spain national football team UEFA Euro 1964 venue, 1982 FIFA World Cup venue 1992 Summer Olympics venue 1989 and 1999 UEFA Champions League finals venue	1957	4	
2	Wembley Stadium	90,000	London	England	England national football team 2011, 2013 and 2024 UEFA Champions League finals venue UEFA Euro 2020 and 2028 finals venue UEFA Women's Euro 2022 Final venue London 2012 Olympic Games Final venue Rugby League Challenge Cup Final venue AEW All In London, NFL International Series	2007	4	
3	Santiago Bernabéu	83,186	Madrid	Spain	Real Madrid, Spain national football team UEFA Euro 1964 Final venue, 1982 FIFA World Cup Final venue, 2030 FIFA World Cup Final venue 1957, 1969, 1980 and 2010 UEFA Champions League finals venue	1947	4	
4	Twickenham Stadium	82,000	London	England	England national rugby union team. 1991 & 2015 Rugby World Cup final 2000, 2004, 2007, 2012, 2015, 2021, & 2025 Heineken Cup Final; NFL International Series	1907		
5	Stade de France	81,338 (field); 69,000 (athletics)	Saint-Denis	France	France national football team, France national rugby union team 1998 FIFA World Cup Final venue, 2003 FIFA Confederations Cup Final venue, UEFA Euro 2016 Final venue 2000, 2006 and 2022 UEFA Champions League finals venue 2007 and 2023 Rugby World Cup venue, 2010 Heineken Cup Final venue 2024 Summer Olympics venue 2003 World Championships in Athletics	1998	4	
6	Luzhniki Stadium	81,000	Moscow	Russia	Russia national football team* 1980 Summer Olympics venue 2018 FIFA World Cup Final venue 2008 UEFA Champions League Final venue	1956	4	

=== Capacity of 70,000–80,000 ===
Rank	Name	Capacity	City	Country	Tenants/notes	Built	UEFA category	Images
1	Atatürk Olympic Stadium	77,563	Istanbul	Turkey	Fatih Karagümrük (temporary venue); Turkey national football team 2005 and 2023 UEFA Champions League finals venue	2002		
2	San Siro	75,817	Milan	Italy	AC Milan and Internazionale; 1990 FIFA World Cup venue 1965, 1970, 2001 and 2016 UEFA Champions League finals venue	1926		
3	Allianz Arena	75,000	Munich	Germany	Bayern Munich; 2006 FIFA World Cup venue, UEFA Euro 2020 venue, UEFA Euro 2024 venue 2012 and 2025 UEFA Champions League finals venue NFL International Series; Stadium uses retractable seating	2005		
4	Olympiastadion	74,475	Berlin	Germany	Hertha BSC; 1936 Summer Olympics venue 2006 FIFA World Cup Final venue, UEFA Euro 2024 Final venue 2015 UEFA Champions League Final venue	1936		
5	Old Trafford	74,244	Manchester	England	Manchester United; 1966 FIFA World Cup venue, UEFA Euro 1996 venue, 2003 UEFA Champions League Final venue,UEFA Women's Euro 2022 venue, Nigel Benn vs. Chris Eubank II venue, Super League Grand Final venue	1910		
6	Principality Stadium	73,952	Cardiff	Wales	Wales national rugby union team WWE Clash at the Castle; 1999 Rugby World Cup Final venue 2002, 2006, 2008, 2011, 2014, 2025 Heineken Cup Final venue 2017 UEFA Champions League Final venue UEFA Euro 2028 venue	1999		
7	Estadio La Cartuja de Sevilla	71,374	Seville	Spain	Athletics, Spain national football team* UEFA Euro 2020 venue 2003 UEFA Cup final venue	1999		
8	Metropolitano Stadium	70,813	Madrid	Spain	Atlético Madrid; 2019 and 2027 UEFA Champions League final venue	1994	Match 32 - Atleti vs Athletic Bilbao	
9	NSC Olimpiyskiy	70,050 (cl)	Kyiv	Ukraine	Ukraine national football team*, Dynamo Kyiv; UEFA Euro 2012 Final venue 2018 UEFA Champions League Final venue	1923		

=== Capacity of 60,000–70,000 ===
Rank	Name	Capacity	City	Country	Tenants/notes	Built	UEFA category	Images
16	Athens Olympic Stadium	69,618	Athens	Greece	Greece national football team* 2004 Summer Olympics; 1983, 1994 and 2007 UEFA Champions League finals venue	1982	4	
17	Croke Park	69,100 (Note: Croke Park's total capacity of 82,300 includes 13,200 terrace places.)	Dublin	Ireland	Gaelic Athletic Association; Hurling Championship and Football Championship finals venue NHL and NFL finals venue 2003 Special Olympics World Summer Games opening and closing ceremonies venue Ireland national rugby union team home matches (2007–2010); Republic of Ireland national football team home matches (2007–2009)	1884		
18	Estádio da Luz	68,100	Lisbon	Portugal	Benfica; UEFA Euro 2004 Final venue 2014 and 2020 UEFA Champions League Final venue	2003	4	
19	London Stadium	68,013; 62,500 (limited capacity)	London	England	West Ham United; 2012 Summer Olympics and Paralympics as 80,000-seat athletics venue	2012	4	
20	Stadio Olimpico	67,585	Rome	Italy	Roma, Lazio, Italy national rugby union team 1960 Summer Olympics venue, 1990 FIFA World Cup Final venue, UEFA Euro 2020 venue 1977, 1984, 1996 and 2009 UEFA Champions League finals venue	1930	4	
21	Stade Vélodrome	67,394	Marseille	France	Marseille; 1938 FIFA World Cup venue, 1998 FIFA World Cup venue UEFA Euro 1960 venue, UEFA Euro 1984 venue, UEFA Euro 2016 venue 2007 Rugby World Cup venue, 2023 Rugby World Cup venue	1937	4	
22	Puskás Aréna	67,155	Budapest	Hungary	Hungary national football team UEFA Euro 2020 venue 2023 UEFA Europa League Final venue 2026 UEFA Champions League final venue	2019	4	
23	Murrayfield Stadium	67,144	Edinburgh	Scotland	Scotland national rugby union team, Edinburgh Rugby; 2005, 2009 and 2017 Heineken Cup Final venue	1925	4	
24	Signal Iduna Park	66,099 (Note: Stadium capacity is 81,365 for domestic fixtures where retractable seating not deployed, and 66,099 for international fixtures where retractable seating is deployed to meet UEFA or FIFA requirements.)	Dortmund	Germany	Borussia Dortmund, Germany national football team (selected matches); 1974 and 2006 FIFA World Cup venue, UEFA Euro 2024 venue 2001 UEFA Cup Final venue	1974	4	
25	Krestovsky Stadium	63,145	Saint Petersburg	Russia	Zenit; 2017 FIFA Confederations Cup venue, 2018 FIFA World Cup venue, UEFA Euro 2020 venue	2017	4	
26	Olympiastadion	63,118	Munich	Germany	Athletics; 1972 Summer Olympics venue 1974 FIFA World Cup Final venue 1979, 1993 and 1997 UEFA Champions League finals venue 2012 UEFA Women's Champions League final venue	1972		
27	Tottenham Hotspur Stadium	62,850	London	England	Tottenham Hotspur; NFL International Series (2019–present); UEFA Euro 2028 venue	2019	4	
28	Etihad Stadium	61,470	Manchester	England	Manchester City; 2002 Commonwealth Games; 2015 Rugby World Cup venue 2008 UEFA Cup Final venue UEFA Euro 2028 venue	2002	4	
29	Anfield	61,276	Liverpool	England	Liverpool	1884	4	
30	Estadio Benito Villamarín	60,721	Seville	Spain	Real Betis; 1982 FIFA World Cup venue	1929	4	
31	Emirates Stadium	60,704	London	England	Arsenal	2006	4	
32	Celtic Park	60,411	Glasgow	Scotland	Celtic; 2014 Commonwealth Games venue	1892	4	

=== Capacity of 50,000–60,000 ===
Rank	Name	Capacity	City	Country	Tenants/notes	Built	UEFA category	Image
33	Parc Olympique Lyonnais	59,186	Lyon	France	Lyon; UEFA Euro 2016 venue, 2019 FIFA Women's World Cup venue 2018 UEFA Europa League Final venue 2023 Rugby World Cup venue	2016	4	
34	PGE Narodowy	58,580	Warsaw	Poland	Poland national football team UEFA Euro 2012 venue 2015 UEFA Europa League Final venue 2024 UEFA Super Cup venue 2027 UEFA Women's Champions League final venue	2011	4	
35	Stadio San Nicola	58,248	Bari	Italy	Bari; 1990 FIFA World Cup venue 1991 European Cup Final venue	1990	3	
36	Estadi Olímpic Lluís Companys	55,926	Barcelona	Spain	Athletics, 1992 Summer Olympics venue 2003 World Police and Fire Games venue	1927	4	
37	Johan Cruijff ArenA	55,445	Amsterdam	Netherlands	Ajax; Netherlands national football team* 1998 Gay Games venue UEFA Euro 2000 venue, UEFA Euro 2020 venue 1998 UEFA Champions League Final venue, 2013 UEFA Europa League Final venue	1996	4	
38	Silesian Stadium	55,211	Chorzów	Poland	Ruch Chorzów; Poland national football team	1956	4	
39	Arena Națională	54,851	Bucharest	Romania	Romania national football team FCSB; UEFA Euro 2020 venue 2012 UEFA Europa League Final venue	2011	4	
40	MHPArena	54,812	Stuttgart	Germany	VfB Stuttgart; 1974 FIFA World Cup, 2006 FIFA World Cup venue UEFA Euro 1988, UEFA Euro 2024 venue 1959 and 1988 UEFA Champions League finals venue	1933	4	
41	Stadio Diego Armando Maradona	54,732	Naples	Italy	Napoli; 1990 FIFA World Cup venue 2019 Summer Universiade venue	1959	3	
42	Ali Sami Yen Stadium	53,978	Istanbul	Turkey	Galatasaray	2011	4	
43	San Mamés	53,332	Bilbao	Spain	Athletic Bilbao; 2018 European Rugby Champions Cup final venue 2024 UEFA Women's Champions League final venue 2025 UEFA Europa League final venue	2013	4	
44	Red Star Stadium	53,000	Belgrade	Serbia	Crvena Zvezda; UEFA Euro 1976 Final & 1973 European Cup Final venue	1963	4	
45	Hill Dickinson Stadium	52,769	Liverpool	England	Everton; UEFA Euro 2028 venue	2025		
46	St. James' Park	52,264	Newcastle upon Tyne	England	Newcastle United; 2015 Rugby World Cup venue 2019 European Rugby Champions Cup Final venue UEFA Euro 2028 venue	1886	4	
47	Donbas Arena	52,187 (cl)	Donetsk	Ukraine	Shakhtar Donetsk; UEFA Euro 2012 venue Now closed due to War in Donbas	2009	4	
48	Estádio José Alvalade	52,095	Lisbon	Portugal	Sporting CP; UEFA Euro 2004 venue 2005 UEFA Cup Final venue 2019–20 UEFA Champions League knockout phase venue 2025 UEFA Women's Champions League Final venue	2003	4	
49	Hampden Park	52,032	Glasgow	Scotland	Scotland national football team, Queen's Park; 1960, 1976 and 2002 UEFA Champions League finals venue 1962 and 1968 UEFA Cup Winners Cup finals venue 2007 UEFA Cup Final venue 2014 Commonwealth Games venue UEFA Euro 2020, UEFA Euro 2028 venue	1903	4	
50	Aviva Stadium	51,711	Dublin	Ireland	Ireland national rugby union team, Republic of Ireland national football team, Leinster Rugby; 2011 UEFA Europa League Final venue 2013 Heineken Cup Final venue UEFA Euro 2028 venue	2010	4	
51	Ibrox Stadium	51,700	Glasgow	Scotland	Rangers; 2014 Commonwealth Games venue	1899	4	
52	Volksparkstadion	51,500	Hamburg	Germany	Hamburger SV; 1974 FIFA World Cup venue, 2006 FIFA World Cup venue, UEFA Euro 1988 venue UEFA Euro 2024 venue 2010 UEFA Europa League Final venue	1953	4	
53	Ernst Happel Stadion	50,865	Vienna	Austria	Austria national football team, Rapid Vienna*, Austria Vienna*; UEFA Euro 2008 Final venue 1964, 1987, 1990 and 1995 UEFA Champions League finals venue	1931	4	
54	Strawberry Arena	50,653	Stockholm	Sweden	AIK, Sweden men's national football team UEFA Women's Euro 2013 venue 2017 UEFA Europa League Final venue 2013 and 2014 national bandy finals venue	2012	4	
55	Stade Pierre-Mauroy	50,157	Lille	France	Lille; UEFA Euro 2016 venue 2023 Rugby World Cup venue	2012	4	
56	Estádio do Dragão	50,033	Porto	Portugal	Porto; UEFA Euro 2004 venue 2019 UEFA Nations League Final venue, 2021 UEFA Champions League Final venue	2003	4	
57	King Baudouin Stadium	50,024	Brussels	Belgium	Belgium national football team UEFA Euro 2000 venue	1930		
58	Arena AufSchalke	50,000	Gelsenkirchen	Germany	Schalke 04; 2006 FIFA World Cup venue, UEFA Euro 2024 venue 2004 UEFA Champions League Final venue Stadium uses both retractable and movable seating	2001	4	

=== Capacity of 40,000–50,000 ===
Rank	Name	Capacity	City	Country	Tenants/notes	Built	UEFA category	Image
59	Mestalla Stadium	49,430	Valencia	Spain	Valencia; 1982 FIFA World Cup venue	1923	4	
60	Parc des Princes	48,229	Paris	France	Paris Saint-Germain; 1938 FIFA World Cup venue, 1956 European Cup Final venue, UEFA Euro 1960 venue, UEFA Euro 1984 venue, 1998 FIFA World Cup venue, UEFA Euro 2016 venue 2019 FIFA Women's World Cup venue 2007 Rugby World Cup venue	1897	4	
61	Stadium of Light	48,095	Sunderland	England	Sunderland	1997	4	
62	Stadion Feijenoord "De Kuip"	47,500	Rotterdam	Netherlands	Feyenoord; Netherlands national football team* UEFA Euro 2000 Final venue 1972, 1982 UEFA Champions League venue 1963, 1968, 1974, 1985, 1991, 1997 UEFA Cup Winners' Cup Final venue 1974, 2002 UEFA Cup Final venue	1937	4	
63	Fritz-Walter-Stadion	47,500	Kaiserslautern	Germany	1. FC Kaiserslautern; 2006 FIFA World Cup venue	1920		
64	Deutsche Bank Park	47,000	Frankfurt	Germany	Eintracht Frankfurt; 1974 FIFA World Cup venue, UEFA Euro 1988 venue, 2005 FIFA Confederations Cup Final venue, 2006 FIFA World Cup venue, UEFA Euro 2024 venue 1980 UEFA Cup final venue, 2011 FIFA Women's World Cup final venue	1925		
65	Merkur Spiel-Arena	47,000	Düsseldorf	Germany	Fortuna Düsseldorf; UEFA Euro 2024 venue Stadium uses retractable seating	2004		
66	Borussia-Park	46,249	Mönchengladbach	Germany	Borussia Mönchengladbach; 2011 FIFA Women's World Cup venue	2004		
67	Volgograd Arena	45,568	Volgograd	Russia	Rotor Volgograd; 2018 FIFA World Cup venue	2018	4	
68	Lukoil Arena	45,360	Moscow	Russia	Spartak Moscow; 2017 FIFA Confederations Cup venue, 2018 FIFA World Cup venue	2014	4	
69	Ak Bars Arena	45,093	Kazan	Russia	Rubin Kazan; 2017 FIFA Confederations Cup venue, 2018 FIFA World Cup venue	2013	4	
70	Rostov Arena	45,000	Rostov-on-Don	Russia	Rostov; 2018 FIFA World Cup venue	2018	4	
71	Panathenaic Stadium	45,000	Athens	Greece	1896 Summer Olympics venue, 2004 Summer Olympics venue 2011 Special Olympics World Summer Games venue	1869		
72	Páirc Uí Chaoimh	45,000	Cork City	Ireland	Cork GAA	1976		
73	Nizhny Novgorod Stadium	44,899	Nizhny Novgorod	Russia	Pari Nizhny Novgorod; 2018 FIFA World Cup venue	2018	4	
74	Mordovia Arena	44,442 (t); 28,000	Saransk	Russia	2018 FIFA World Cup venue	2018	4	
75	Max-Morlock-Stadion	44,308	Nuremberg	Germany	1. FC Nürnberg; 2006 FIFA World Cup venue	1928		
76	Vasil Levski National Stadium	43,230	Sofia	Bulgaria	Bulgaria national football team, CSKA Sofia	1953	4	
77	Villa Park	43,205	Birmingham	England	Aston Villa, 1966 FIFA World Cup venue, UEFA Euro 1996, UEFA Euro 2028 venue, 1999 UEFA Cup Winners' Cup Final venue, 2012 FA Community Shield	1897	4	
78	RheinEnergieStadion	43,000	Cologne	Germany	1. FC Köln; 2006 FIFA World Cup venue, UEFA Euro 2024 venue 2010 Gay Games venue 2020 UEFA Europa League Final venue	2004		
79	Niedersachsenstadion	43,000	Hanover	Germany	Hannover 96; 2006 FIFA World Cup venue Stadium uses retractable seating	1954		
80	Ullevi	43,000	Gothenburg	Sweden	1958 World Cup; UEFA Euro 1992; 1983 European Cup Winners Cup Final 1995 World Championships in Athletics; 2006 European Championships in Athletics; 1961, 1966, 1968 and 1971 World Allround Speed Skating Championships; Gothenburg derbies	1958		
81	ENEA Stadion	42,837	Poznań	Poland	Lech Poznań; UEFA Euro 2012 venue	1980	4	
82	Wrocław Stadium	42,771	Wrocław	Poland	Śląsk Wrocław; 2025 UEFA Conference League final venue UEFA Euro 2012 venue	2011	4	
83	Estadio Ramón Sánchez Pizjuán	42,714	Seville	Spain	Sevilla; 1982 FIFA World Cup venue	1957	4	
84	Beşiktaş Stadium	42,590	Istanbul	Turkey	Beşiktaş; 2019 UEFA Super Cup venue	2016	4	
85	Samara Arena	42,347	Samara	Russia	Krylia Sovetov; 2018 FIFA World Cup venue	2018	4	
86	Matmut Atlantique	42,115	Bordeaux	France	Bordeaux; UEFA Euro 2016 venue 2023 Rugby World Cup venue	2015	4	
87	Stade Geoffroy-Guichard	41,965	Saint-Étienne	France	Saint-Étienne; UEFA Euro 1984 venue, 1998 FIFA World Cup venue, 2003 FIFA Confederations Cup venue, UEFA Euro 2016 venue 2007 Rugby World Cup venue, 2023 Rugby World Cup venue	1931		
88	Stadion Gdańsk	41,620	Gdańsk	Poland	Lechia Gdańsk; UEFA Euro 2012 venue 2021 UEFA Europa League Final venue	2011	4	
89	Juventus Stadium	41,507	Turin	Italy	Juventus; 2021 UEFA Nations League Finals venue 2014 UEFA Europa League Final venue, 2022 UEFA Women's Champions League Final venue	2011	4	
90	Stamford Bridge	40,044	London	England	Chelsea; 2013 UEFA Women's Champions League final venue	1877	4	
91	Metalist Stadium	40,003 (cl)	Kharkiv	Ukraine	Metalist 1925; UEFA Euro 2012 venue	1926	4	
92	Red Bull Arena	40,000	Leipzig	Germany	RB Leipzig; 2006 FIFA World Cup venue, UEFA Euro 2024 venue	1954	4	
93	Stadio Artemio Franchi	40,000	Florence	Italy	Fiorentina; 1990 FIFA World Cup venue	1931		

=== Capacity of 30,000–40,000 ===
Rank	Name	Capacity	City	Country	Tenants/notes	Built	UEFA category	Image
94	RCDE Stadium	40,000	Barcelona	Spain	Espanyol	2009	4	
95	Hauptstadion	40,000	Aachen	Germany		1924		
96	Estadio Anoeta	39,500	San Sebastián	Spain	Real Sociedad; 2020 UEFA Women's Champions League final venue	1993	4	
97	Goodison Park	39,414	Liverpool	England	Everton; 1966 FIFA World Cup venue	1892		
98	Stadio San Filippo	38,722	Messina	Italy	Messina	2004		
99	St. Jakob-Park	38,512	Basel	Switzerland	Basel; UEFA Euro 2008 venue 2016 UEFA Europa League Final venue UEFA Women's Euro 2025 final venue	2001	4	
100	Stade Bollaert-Delelis	38,223	Lens	France	Lens; UEFA Euro 1984 venue, 1998 FIFA World Cup venue, UEFA Euro 2016 venue 2007 Rugby World Cup venue	1932		
101	Parken Stadium	38,190	Copenhagen	Denmark	Copenhagen; Denmark national football team UEFA Euro 2020 venue 2006 Royal League Final; Eurovision Song Contest 2001; 2000 UEFA Cup Final; 1994 European Cup Winners' Cup Final	1992	4	
102	McHale Park	38,000	Castlebar	Ireland	Mayo GAA	1931		
103	Fitzgerald Stadium	38,000	Killarney	Ireland	Kerry GAA	1936		
104	Stadio Renzo Barbera	37,619	Palermo	Italy	Palermo; 1990 FIFA World Cup venue	1932		
105	Elland Road Stadium	37,608	Leeds	England	Leeds United; UEFA Euro 1996 venue	1897		
106	Estádio Nacional	37,593	Oeiras	Portugal	Taça de Portugal Finals; 1967 European Cup Final	1944		
107	Weserstadion	37,441	Bremen	Germany	Werder Bremen; Stadium uses retractable seating	1923		
108	Stadio Renato Dall'Ara	36,532	Bologna	Italy	Bologna; 1990 FIFA World Cup venue	1927		
109	Helsinki Olympic Stadium	36,251	Helsinki	Finland	Finland national football team 1952 Summer Olympics; 1983 World Championships in Athletics, 2005 World Championships in Athletics; UEFA Women's Euro 2009 Final venue 2022 UEFA Super Cup venue	1938	4	
110	Allianz Riviera	36,178	Nice	France	Nice; UEFA Euro 2016 venue	2013	4	
111	National Athletics Centre Stadium	36,000 (t); 14,000	Budapest	Hungary	Athletics	2023		
112	Stade de la Beaujoire	35,322	Nantes	France	Nantes; UEFA Euro 1984 venue, 1998 FIFA World Cup venue 2007 Rugby World Cup venue	1984		
113	Philips Stadion	35,200	Eindhoven	Netherlands	PSV; Netherlands national football team* UEFA Euro 2000 venue 2006 UEFA Cup final venue, 2023 UEFA Women's Champions League final venue	1913	4	
114	Kuban Stadium (Note: Depending on the boundary between the continents, the stadium can be considered as located in Asia)	35,200	Krasnodar	Russia	FC Kuban	1960		
115	Krasnodar Stadium	35,179	Krasnodar	Russia	FC Krasnodar	2016		
116	Stadion Maksimir	35,123	Zagreb	Croatia	GNK Dinamo	1912 (1948)		
117	Kaliningrad Stadium	35,016	Kaliningrad	Russia	Baltika Kaliningrad; 2018 FIFA World Cup venue	2018	4	
118	Hillsborough Stadium	34,945	Sheffield	England	Sheffield Wednesday; 1966 FIFA World Cup venue, UEFA Euro 1996 venue	1899		
119	Arena Lviv	34,725 (cl)	Lviv	Ukraine	FC Lviv; UEFA Euro 2012 venue	2011	4	
120	Europa-Park Stadion	34,700	Europa-Park Stadion	Germany	SC Freiburg	2021		
121	Stade Jacques Chaban-Delmas	34,694	Bordeaux	France	Union Bordeaux-Bègles; 1938 FIFA World Cup venue, 1998 FIFA World Cup venue 2007 Rugby World Cup venue	1924		
122	Riazor	34,600	A Coruña	Spain	Deportivo La Coruña; 1982 FIFA World Cup venue	1940		
123	Grotenburg-Stadion	34,500	Krefeld	Germany	Uerdingen 05	1927		
124	Chornomorets Stadium	34,164 (cl)	Odesa	Ukraine	Chornomorets Odesa	1936	4	
125	Stadion Poljud	33,987	Split	Croatia	Hajduk Split	1979	4	
126	Riverside Stadium	33,931	Middlesbrough	England	Middlesbrough	1995		
127	Stadion Henryka Reymana	33,326	Kraków	Poland	Wisła Kraków	1953	4	
128	Mewa Arena	33,305	Mainz	Germany	Mainz 05	2011		
129	Stadio Luigi Ferraris	33,205	Genoa	Italy	Genoa, Sampdoria; 1990 FIFA World Cup venue	1911		
130	Cardiff City Stadium	33,280	Cardiff	Wales	Cardiff City, Wales National Football Team; 2014 UEFA Super Cup venue 2017 UEFA Women's Champions League final venue	2009	4	
131	Metallurg Stadium	33,220	Samara	Russia		1957		
132	Stadium Municipal	33,150	Toulouse	France	Toulouse; 1938 FIFA World Cup venue, 1998 FIFA World Cup venue, UEFA Euro 2016 venue 2007 Rugby World Cup venue	1937		
133	Belarus National Stadium	33,145	Minsk	Belarus	Belarus national football team	2025		
134	Estadio Nueva Condomina	33,045	Murcia	Spain	Real Murcia	2006		
135	3Arena	33,000	Stockholm	Sweden	Djurgårdens, Hammarby	2013	4	
136	New Tivoli	32,960	Aachen	Germany	Alemannia Aachen	2009		
137	Pride Park Stadium	32,956	Derby	England	Derby County	1997		
138	Stade de la Mosson	32,939	Montpellier	France	MHSC; 1998 FIFA World Cup venue, 2019 FIFA Women's World Cup venue	1972		
139	Estádio Municipal de Aveiro	32,830	Aveiro	Portugal	Beira-Mar; UEFA Euro 2004 venue	2003	4	
140	Coventry Building Society Arena	32,609	Coventry	England	Coventry City; 2012 Summer Olympics venue	2005	4	
141	Agia Sophia Stadium	32,500	Athens	Greece	AEK; Greece national football team* 2024 UEFA Europa Conference League Final venue	2022	4	
142	Estadio Balaídos	32,500	Vigo	Spain	Celta; 1982 FIFA World Cup venue	1928		
143	Toše Proeski Arena	32,483	Skopje	North Macedonia	FK Vardar, FK Rabotnički, North Macedonia national football team* 2017 UEFA Super Cup venue	1947	4	
144	Republican Spartak Stadium	32,464	Vladikavkaz	Russia	Alania Vladikavkaz	1962		
145	Stadio Nereo Rocco	32,454	Trieste	Italy	Triestina	1992		
146	St. Mary's Stadium	32,384	Southampton	England	Southampton; UEFA Women's Euro 2022 venue	2001	4	
147	Stadio Euganeo	32,336	Padova	Italy	Padova	1994		
148	King Power Stadium	32,262	Leicester	England	Leicester City	2002		
149	Karaiskakis Stadium	32,115	Piraeus	Greece	Olympiacos; 2023 UEFA Super Cup venue	1896	4	
150	Rudolf Harbig Stadion	32,066	Dresden	Germany	Dynamo Dresden	1923		
151	Bramall Lane	32,050	Sheffield	England	Sheffield United, Sheffield Eagles*; UEFA Women's Euro 2022 venue	1855		
152	Wörthersee Stadion	32,000	Klagenfurt am Wörthersee	Austria	UEFA Euro 2008 venue	2007		
153	Stade de Suisse	32,000	Bern	Switzerland	Young Boys; UEFA Euro 2008 venue UEFA Women's Euro 2025 venue	2005	4	
154	Stadion am Schloss Strünkede	32,000	Herne	Germany	Westfalia Herne	1910		
155	Lord's Cricket Ground	32,000	London	England	Marylebone Cricket Club, Middlesex County Cricket Club, England cricket team*	1814		
156	Paris La Défense Arena	32,000	Nanterre	France	Racing 92; Uses movable seating to transition between field and court sports	2017		
157	American Express Stadium	31,876	Brighton	England	Brighton & Hove Albion; UEFA Women's Euro 2022 venue	2011		
158	Central Trade Union Stadium	31,793; 19,845 (limited capacity)	Voronezh	Russia	FC Fakel Voronezh, FC FSA Voronezh	2003		
159	Molineux Stadium	31,750	Wolverhampton	England	Wolverhampton Wanderers	1889		
160	Shakhtar Stadium	31,718 (cl)	Donetsk	Ukraine	Shakhtar Donetsk Reserves and Youth Team*, Metalurh Donetsk*	1936		
161	Stadio Marcantonio Bentegodi	31,713	Verona	Italy	Hellas Verona; 1990 FIFA World Cup venue	1963		
162	Schauinsland-Reisen-Arena	31,500	Duisburg	Germany	MSV Duisburg, Rhein Fire (ELF)	2004		
163	Estadio Manuel Martínez Valero	31,388	Elche	Spain	Elche; 1982 FIFA World Cup venue	1976	4	
164	Ewood Park	31,363	Blackburn	England	Blackburn Rovers	1882		
165	Stadionul Steaua	31,254	Bucharest	Romania	Steaua București	2021	4	
166	Polish Army Stadium	31,103	Warsaw	Poland	Legia Warsaw	1930	4	
167	Dnipro Arena	31,003 (cl)	Dnipro	Ukraine	FC Dnipro, SC Dnipro-1	2008	4	
168	Stadionul Ion Oblemenco	30,983	Craiova	Romania	Universitatea Craiova	2017	4	
169	Augsburg Arena	30,660	Augsburg	Germany	FC Augsburg	2009		
170	Akhmat Arena	30,597	Grozni	Russia	Akhmat Grozny	2011		
171	Stadio Ettore Giardiniero – Via del Mare	30,534	Lecce	Italy	Lecce	1966		
172	Estadio Carlos Tartiere	30,500	Oviedo	Spain	Real Oviedo	2000		
173	City Ground	30,404	Nottingham	England	Nottingham Forest	1898		
174	Cluj Arena	30,335	Cluj Napoca	Romania	Universitatea Cluj Napoca	2011	4	
175	Estádio Algarve	30,305	Faro	Portugal	Gibraltar national football team UEFA Euro 2004 venue	2004	4	
176	Stadium MK	30,303	Milton Keynes	England	Milton Keynes Dons; UEFA Women's Euro 2022 venue	2007		
177	Estádio Municipal de Braga	30,286	Braga	Portugal	Braga; UEFA Euro 2004 venue	2003	4	
178	De Grolsch Veste	30,250	Enschede	Netherlands	Twente; Netherlands national football team* UEFA Women's Euro 2017 final venue	1998		
179	BayArena	30,210	Leverkusen	Germany	Bayer Leverkusen; Stadium uses retractable seating	1932		
180	Red Bull Arena	30,188; 29,520 (seated)	Salzburg	Austria	Red Bull Salzburg; UEFA Euro 2008 venue	2003		
181	PreZero Arena	30,150	Sinsheim	Germany	TSG Hoffenheim; Stadium uses retractable seating	2009		
182	Volkswagen Arena	30,122	Wolfsburg	Germany	VfL Wolfsburg; Stadium uses retractable seating	2002		
183	Koševo City Stadium	30,121	Sarajevo	Bosnia and Herzegovina	FK Sarajevo; 1984 Winter Olympics opening ceremony venue	1947	2	
184	VEB Arena	30,114	Moscow	Russia	CSKA Moscow	2016	4	
185	Avnet Arena	30,098	Magdeburg	Germany	1. FC Magdeburg	2006		
186	bet365 Stadium	30,089	Stoke-on-Trent	England	Stoke City	1997		
187	Stade de Genève	30,084	Geneva	Switzerland	Servette; UEFA Euro 2008 venue UEFA Women's Euro 2025 venue	2003		
188	Estadio La Rosaleda	30,044	Málaga	Spain	Málaga; 1982 FIFA World Cup venue	1941	4	
189	Estádio D. Afonso Henriques	30,029	Guimarães	Portugal	Vitória SC; UEFA Euro 2004 venue 2019 UEFA Nations League semi-final 2 and third-place play-off	1999	4	
190	Stade Maurice Dufrasne	30,023; 27,670 (limited capacity)	Liège	Belgium	Standard Liège; UEFA Euro 2000 venue	1909		

== Under construction ==
The following is a list of European stadiums which are currently under construction and will have a capacity of 30,000 or more.

Stadium	Capacity	City	Country	Tenant(s)	Opening
Nou Mestalla	70,044	Valencia	Spain	Valencia	2027
Nacionalni stadion	52,241	Belgrade	Serbia	Serbia national football team	2027
La Romareda	43,110	Zaragoza	Spain	Real Zaragoza	2027
Votanikos Arena	40,000	Athens	Greece	Panathinaikos	2027

== See also ==
- List of African stadiums by capacity
- List of Asian stadiums by capacity
- List of North American stadiums by capacity
- List of Oceanian stadiums by capacity
- List of South American stadiums by capacity
- List of association football stadiums by country
- Lists of stadiums
- Sport in Europe
