= The Walks =

Sports venue in Norfolk, UK

The Docherty Walks
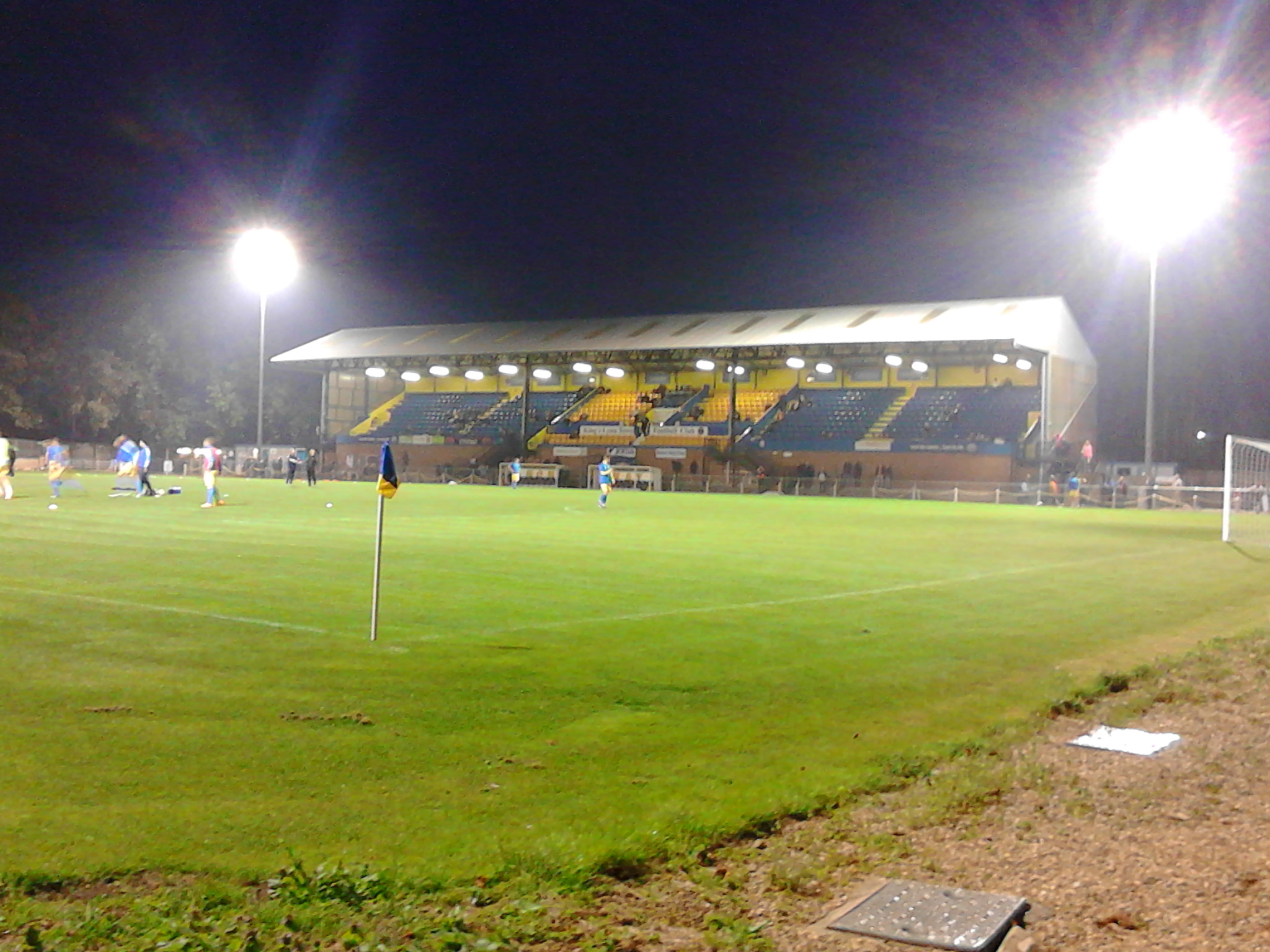
- Interactive map of The Docherty Walks
- Location: Tennyson Rd; King's Lynn; Norfolk; PE30 5PB
- Coordinates: 52.7501°N 0.4074°E
- Owner: King's Lynn and West Norfolk Borough Council
- Operator: King's Lynn Town Football Club
- Capacity: 8,200 (1,200 seated)
- Record attendance: 12,937 (King's Lynn vs Exeter City, 24 November 1951)
- Field size: 100 by 64 yards (91 m × 59 m)
- Surface: Lawn grass

Construction
- Built: 1879
- Opened: 1881

Tenants
- King's Lynn (1881–2009); King's Lynn Town (2010–present)

The Walks is a football stadium in King's Lynn, Norfolk, England and the home of King's Lynn Town. King's Lynn Town took over the Walks ground from King's Lynn, who had played there since being formed in 1881 before being wound up in 2009.

== History ==
Canvas screens were erected around the ground in 1892 to prevent people watching matches without paying. In 1893 a match was played against Wisbech Town under electric lights. A stand was built in 1896, although it was demolished in 1905, replaced by a 500-seat wooden grandstand built at a cost of £250.

In the mid-1950s the Supporters Club installed terracing for 4,000 and 780 seats on the northern side of the pitch. In 1955 the wooden stand was sold to a company in Spalding and a new grandstand seating 1,400 with a terraced paddock holding 3,000 was built at a cost of £27,000 and opened by then FIFA President and FA Chairman Arthur Drewry on 18 August 1956.

Floodlights were installed in 1963 and used for the first time in a Culey Festival Cup match against Cambridge City on 25 September.

== Attendance ==
The ground currently has a capacity of 8,200 (1,200 seated) though the record attendance at the ground is 12,937, recorded when King's Lynn played Exeter City on 24 November 1951 in an FA Cup first round tie.

== See also ==
- The Walks, Premier urban park in King's Lynn.
