= List of record home attendances of English football clubs =

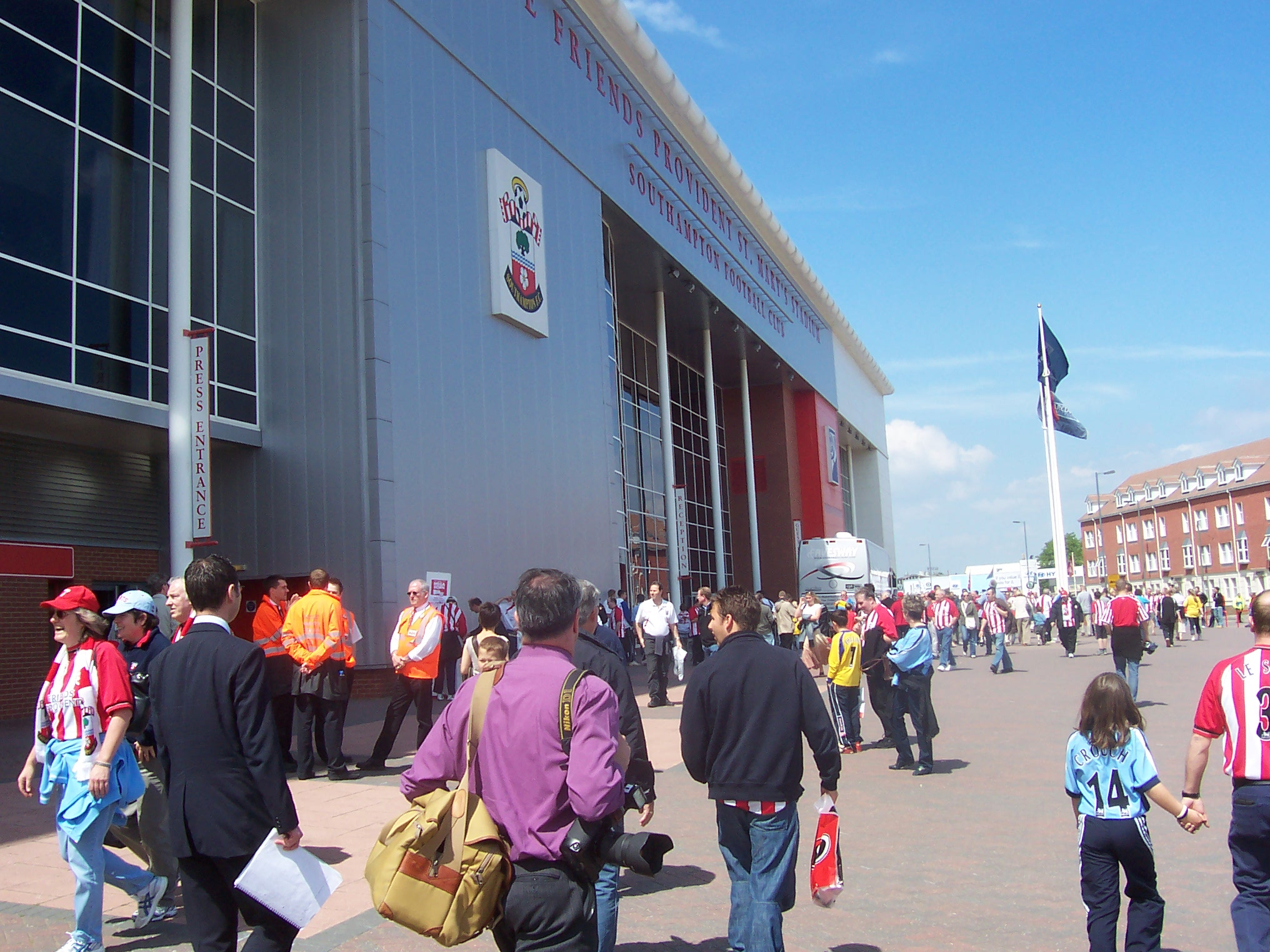
St Mary's, the home of Southampton, is one of the few club grounds to have set an attendance record in the 21st century.

This is a list of record home attendances of English football clubs. It lists the highest attendance of all English non-League, English Football League and Premier League clubs, for a home match above a highest attendance of 5,000. It is noticeable that a large proportion of records were set at matches in the FA Cup.

Ground capacities have declined for many clubs since all-seater stadia were introduced in the late 1980s, especially at older grounds, with many records set at the terraced stadia, with their high standing capacities, that were replaced. In several cases records were achieved at a former ground rather than the club's current location. For example, Wigan Athletic's record was set at Springfield Park, not their current home, the DW Stadium.

The record home attendance for five clubs occurred away from their usual home grounds. Manchester United's record home attendance was set at Maine Road, the home of neighbours Manchester City, during a period when United's Old Trafford was being rebuilt following bomb damage sustained during the Second World War. During the 1998–99 season Arsenal played their UEFA Champions League home matches at Wembley, with the 73,707 attendance against Lens exceeding the record for Highbury and Tottenham Hotspur also played their UEFA Champions League games at Wembley Stadium in the 2016–17 season. Similarly, Accrington Stanley's record home attendance was set when the club played an FA Cup home tie at Blackburn's Ewood Park instead of their usual home (the Crown Ground) and Stevenage's record was set when the club played a "home" FA Cup tie against Birmingham City at Birmingham's St Andrew's ground.

== List ==
Records correct as of 23 December 2023. Italics denote attendance record set at ground not designated as usual home ground; Bold denote attendance record set at current ground.

Rank	Club	Attendance	Stadium	Opposition	Competition	Date	Ref
1	Tottenham Hotspur	85,512	Wembley Stadium (Note: 2016–17 European matches played at Wembley due to redevelopment work at Tottenham Hotspur's home ground, White Hart Lane; record at usual stadium 75,038 vs Sunderland (FA Cup 6th round, 5 March 1938).)	Bayer Leverkusen	UEFA Champions League group stage	2 November 2016	
2	Manchester City	84,569	Maine Road	Stoke City	FA Cup sixth round	3 March 1934	
3	Chelsea	82,905	**Stamford Bridge**	Arsenal	First Division	12 October 1935	
4	Manchester United	81,962	Maine Road (Note: Match played at Manchester City's home ground, Maine Road, due to World War II bomb damage at Manchester United's ground, Old Trafford. Record at own ground is 76,098 against Blackburn Rovers 31 March 2007, however a higher attendance of 76,962 was recorded at Old Trafford for an FA Cup Semi Final between Wolverhampton Wanderers and Grimsby Town 25 March 1939.)	Arsenal	First Division	17 January 1948	
5	Everton	78,299	Goodison Park	Liverpool	First Division	18 September 1948	
6	Aston Villa	76,588	**Villa Park**	Derby County	FA Cup sixth round, first leg	2 March 1946	
7	Sunderland	75,118	Roker Park	Derby County	FA Cup sixth round replay	8 March 1933	
8	Charlton Athletic	75,031	**The Valley**	Aston Villa	FA Cup fifth round	12 February 1938	
9	Arsenal	73,707	Wembley Stadium (1923) (Note: In order to boost attendance figures, Arsenal was granted permission by UEFA and the Football Association to host their home Champions League matches at Wembley Stadium rather than at their home ground of Highbury. Highest attendance at own stadium, Highbury, was 73,295 against Sunderland 9 March 1935.)	RC Lens	UEFA Champions League group stage	25 November 1998	
10	Sheffield Wednesday	72,841	**Hillsborough Stadium**	Manchester City	FA Cup fifth round	17 February 1934	
11	Bolton Wanderers	69,912	Burnden Park	Manchester City	FA Cup fifth round	18 February 1933	
12	Newcastle United	68,386	**St James' Park**	Chelsea	First Division	3 September 1930	
13	Sheffield United	68,287	**Bramall Lane**	Leeds United	FA Cup fifth round	15 February 1936	
14	Huddersfield Town	67,037	Leeds Road	Arsenal	FA Cup sixth round	27 February 1932	
15	Birmingham City	66,844	**St Andrew's**	Everton	FA Cup fifth round	11 March 1939	
16	West Bromwich Albion	64,815	**The Hawthorns**	Arsenal	FA Cup sixth round	6 March 1937	
18	West Ham United	62,477	**London Stadium**	Manchester United	Premier League	23 December 2023	
17	Blackburn Rovers	62,522	**Ewood Park**	Bolton Wanderers	FA Cup sixth round	2 March 1929	
19	Liverpool	61,905	**Anfield**	Wolverhampton Wanderers	FA Cup fourth round	2 February 1952	
20	Wolverhampton Wanderers	61,315	**Molineux Stadium**	Liverpool	FA Cup fifth round	11 February 1939	
21	Cardiff City	57,893	Ninian Park	Arsenal	First Division	22 April 1953	
22	Leeds United	57,892	**Elland Road**	Sunderland	FA Cup fifth round replay	15 March 1967	
23	Hull City	55,019	Boothferry Park	Manchester United	FA Cup sixth round	26 February 1949	
24	Burnley	54,775	**Turf Moor**	Huddersfield Town	FA Cup third round	23 February 1924	
25	Middlesbrough	53,802	Ayresome Park	Newcastle United	First Division	29 December 1949	
26	Crystal Palace	51,482	**Selhurst Park**	Burnley	Second Division	11 May 1979	
27	Coventry City	51,455	Highfield Road	Wolverhampton Wanderers	Second Division	29 April 1967	
28	Portsmouth	51,385	**Fratton Park**	Derby County	FA Cup sixth round	26 February 1949	
29	Stoke City	51,380	Victoria Ground	Arsenal	First Division	29 March 1937	
30	Nottingham Forest	49,946	**City Ground**	Manchester United	First Division	28 October 1967	
31	Port Vale	49,768	**Vale Park**	Aston Villa	FA Cup fifth round	20 February 1960	
32	Fulham	49,335	**Craven Cottage**	Millwall	Second Division	8 October 1938	
33	Millwall	48,672	The Den (old)	Derby County	FA Cup fifth round	20 February 1937	
34	Oldham Athletic	47,671	**Boundary Park**	Sheffield Wednesday	FA Cup fifth round	25 January 1930	
35	Notts County	47,310	**Meadow Lane**	York City	FA Cup sixth round	12 March 1955	
36	Leicester City	47,298	Filbert Street	Tottenham Hotspur	FA Cup fifth round	18 February 1928	
37	Norwich City	43,984	**Carrow Road**	Leicester City	FA Cup sixth round	30 March 1963	
38	Plymouth Argyle	43,596	**Home Park**	Aston Villa	Second Division	10 October 1936	
39	Bristol City	43,335	**Ashton Gate**	Preston North End	FA Cup fifth round	16 February 1935	
40	Preston North End	42,684	**Deepdale**	Arsenal	First Division	23 April 1938	
41	Derby County	41,826	Baseball Ground	Tottenham Hotspur	First Division	20 September 1969	
42	Queens Park Rangers	41,097	White City Stadium	Leeds United	FA Cup third round	9 January 1932	
43	Barnsley	40,255	**Oakwell Stadium**	Stoke City	FA Cup fifth round	15 February 1936	
44	Bury	40,000	**Gigg Lane**	Manchester City	First Division	30 August 1924	
45	Bradford City	39,146	**Valley Parade**	Burnley	FA Cup fourth round	11 March 1911	
46	Brentford	38,678	Griffin Park	Preston North End	FA Cup sixth round	26 February 1949	
47	Bristol Rovers	39,462	Eastville Stadium	Preston North End	FA Cup fourth round	30 January 1960	
48	Blackpool	38,098	**Bloomfield Road**	Wolverhampton Wanderers	First Division	19 September 1955	
49	Ipswich Town	38,010	**Portman Road**	Leeds United	FA Cup sixth round	8 March 1975	
50	Doncaster Rovers	37,149	Belle Vue	Hull City	Third Division North	2 October 1948	
51	Brighton & Hove Albion	36,747	Goldstone Ground	Fulham	Second Division	27 December 1958	
52	Leyton Orient	34,345	**Brisbane Road**	West Ham United	FA Cup fourth round	25 January 1964	
53	Watford	34,099	**Vicarage Road**	Manchester United	FA Cup fourth round replay	3 February 1969	
54	Reading	33,042	Elm Park	Brentford	FA Cup fifth round	19 February 1927	
55	Swansea City	32,796	Vetch Field	Arsenal	FA Cup fourth round	17 February 1968	
56	Southampton	32,728	**St Mary's Stadium**	Queens Park Rangers	EFL Championship	2 March 2013	
57	Swindon Town	32,000	**County Ground**	Arsenal	FA Cup third round	15 January 1972	
58	Grimsby Town	31,651	**Blundell Park**	Wolverhampton Wanderers	FA Cup fifth round	20 February 1937	
59	Southend United	31,033	**Roots Hall**	Liverpool	FA Cup third round	10 January 1979	
60	Chesterfield	30,561	Recreation Ground	Tottenham Hotspur	FA Cup fifth round	12 February 1938	
61	Peterborough United	30,096	**London Road**	Swansea Town	FA Cup fifth round	20 February 1965	
62	Luton Town	30,069	**Kenilworth Road**	Blackpool	FA Cup sixth round replay	4 March 1959	
63	AFC Bournemouth	28,799	**Dean Court**	Manchester United	FA Cup sixth round	2 March 1957	
64	Milton Keynes Dons	28,127	**Stadium MK**	Chelsea	FA Cup fourth round	31 January 2016	
65	York City	28,123	Bootham Crescent	Huddersfield Town	FA Cup sixth round	5 March 1938	
66	Stockport County	27,833	Edgeley Park	Liverpool	FA Cup fifth round	11 February 1950	
67	Wigan Athletic	27,526	Springfield Park	Hereford United	FA Cup second round	12 December 1953	
68	Carlisle United	27,500	**Brunton Park**	Birmingham City	FA Cup third round	5 January 1957	
69	Walsall	25,453	Fellows Park	Newcastle United	Second Division	29 August 1961	
70	Rotherham United	25,170	Millmoor	Sheffield United	Second Division	13 December 1952	
71	Northampton Town	24,523	County Ground	Fulham	First Division	23 April 1966	
72	Tranmere Rovers	24,424	Prenton Park	Stoke City	FA Cup fourth round	5 February 1972	
73	Rochdale	24,371	**Spotland**	Notts County	FA Cup second round	10 December 1949	
74	Scunthorpe United	23,935	Old Showground	Portsmouth	FA Cup fourth round	30 January 1954	
75	Lincoln City	23,196	Sincil Bank	Derby County	League Cup fourth round	15 November 1967	
76	Gillingham	23,002	**Priestfield Stadium**	Queens Park Rangers	FA Cup third round	10 January 1948	
77	Oxford United	22,750	Manor Ground	Preston North End	FA Cup sixth round	29 February 1964	
78	Nuneaton Borough	22,114	Manor Park	Rotherham United F.C.	FA Cup third round	28 January 1967	
79	Torquay United	21,908	**Plainmoor**	Huddersfield Town	FA Cup fourth round	29 January 1955	
80	Exeter City	21,014	**St James Park**	Sunderland	FA Cup sixth round	4 March 1931	
81	Crewe Alexandra	20,000	**Gresty Road**	Tottenham Hotspur	FA Cup fourth round	30 January 1960	
82	Colchester United	19,072	Layer Road	Reading	FA Cup first round	27 November 1948	
83	Shrewsbury Town	18,917	Gay Meadow	Walsall	Third Division	26 April 1961	
84	Hereford United	18,114	Edgar Street	Sheffield Wednesday	FA Cup third round	4 January 1958	
85	Bath City	18,020	**Twerton Park**	Brighton & Hove Albion F.C.	FA Cup third round	9 January 1960	
86	Hartlepool United	17,426	**Victoria Park**	Manchester United	FA Cup third round	5 January 1957	
87	Yeovil Town	16,318	Huish Athletic Ground	Sunderland	FA Cup fourth round	29 January 1949	
88	Dulwich Hamlet	16,254	Champion Hill	Nunhead	FA Cup fourth round	29 January 1931	
89	Wycombe Wanderers	15,850	Loakes Park	St Albans City	FA Amateur Cup fourth round	25 February 1950	
90	Stevenage	15,536	St Andrew's (Note: Record at own stadium, Broadhall Way, is 8,040 against Newcastle United 25 January 1998 (FA Cup 4th round).)	Birmingham City	FA Cup third round	4 January 1997	
91	Cambridge United	14,000	**Abbey Stadium**	Chelsea	Friendly	1 May 1970	
92	Weymouth	12,512	Bob Lucas Stadium	Yeovil Town	FA Cup second round	11 December 1948	
93	Barnet	11,026	Underhill Stadium	Wycombe Wanderers	FA Amateur Cup fourth round	23 February 1952	
94	Accrington Stanley	10,801	Ewood Park (Note: Record at own stadium, The Crown Ground, is 5,397 against Derby County 26 January 2019 (FA Cup 4th round).)	Crewe Alexandra	FA Cup second round	5 December 1995	
95	Cheltenham Town	10,389	The Athletic Ground	Blackpool	FA Cup third round	13 January 1934	
96	Chorley	9,679	Victory Park	Darwen	FA Cup 4th Qual Round	15 November 1932	
97	St Albans City	9,757	Clarence Park	Ferryhill Athletic	FA Amateur Cup 4th Rd	27 February 1926	
98	Morecambe	9,383	Christie Park	Weymouth	FA Cup third round	6 January 1962	
99	Macclesfield Town	9,003	Moss Rose	Winsford United	Cheshire Senior Cup second round	14 February 1948	
100	AFC Wimbledon	8,381	**Plough Lane**	Sunderland	EFL League One	12 February 2022	
101	Aldershot Town	7,500	Recreation Ground	Brighton & Hove Albion	FA Cup first round	18 November 2000	
102	Burton Albion	6,746	**Pirelli Stadium**	Derby County	EFL Championship	26 August 2016	
103	Fleetwood Town	6,150	**Highbury Stadium**	Rochdale	FA Cup first round	13 November 1965	
104	Crawley Town	5,880	**Broadfield Stadium**	Reading	FA Cup third round	5 January 2013	

Footnotes
