= 1969 Anglo-Italian League Cup =

- Match programme cover from second-leg
- Event: 1969 Anglo-Italian League Cup
Swindon Town	A.S. Roma
The FA	FIGC
5	2

First leg
Swindon Town	A.S. Roma
1	2
- Date: 27 August 1969
- Venue: Stadio Olimpico, Rome

Second leg
A.S. Roma	Swindon Town
0	4
- Date: 10 September 1969
- Venue: County Ground, Swindon

The 1969 Anglo-Italian League Cup was a football cup competition held between clubs in England and Italy won by Swindon Town. It was the inaugural Anglo-Italian League Cup competition.

== Background ==
The origin of the Anglo-Italian League Cup (also known as the Anglo-Italian Cup Winners' Cup and billed on the match programme as the International League Cup Winners' Cup) was to reward Swindon Town with European football in lieu of their ineligibility for the Inter-Cities Fairs Cup following their victory in the 1968–69 League Cup, beating Arsenal in the final. The Football League Cup had been changed in 1967 so the winner would be awarded a place in the Inter-Cities Fairs Cup; however, teams outside the First Division were not permitted in the competition. Queens Park Rangers won that year's final but were omitted from the Inter-Cities Fairs Cup as they were in the Third Division. When Swindon, another third division club, won the League Cup two years later the Anglo-Italian League Cup was organised as a way of compensating them for the ruling that prevented them competing in the Inter-Cities Fairs Cup.

The competition consisted of a single two-legged match against the Italian team A.S. Roma who had won the Coppa Italia that season.

== The final ==
The final was played over two legs, with A.S. Roma drawn to host the first game in Rome. The second leg was played in England.

=== 1st leg ===
27 August 1969

A.S. Roma	2–1	Swindon Town
Enzo 43' (pen.); Cappellini 68' (Note: Although the Rec.Sport.Soccer Statistics Foundation report that the goal was scored in the 66th minute, both a predominant unofficial Swindon Town F.C. website and the report in the Swindon Advertiser give the time of the goal as the 68th minute.)	(report)	Noble 52'

Stadio Olimpico, Rome
Attendance: 50,000 (est.)
Referee: K. Howley, Middlesbrough

Roma	Swindon Town

A.S. ROMA:
GK	Alberto Ginulfi
DF	Luciano Spinosi
DF	Francesco Carpenetti
DF	Elvio Salvori
DF	Francesco Cappelli
DF	Sergio Santarini
MF	Joaquin Luca Peiró
FW	Renato Cappellini
MF	Franco Cordova
FW	Fabio Enzo
MF	Fabio Capello
Substitutes:
None
Manager:
Helenio Herrera

SWINDON TOWN F.C.:
GK	Peter Downsborough
RB	Rod Thomas
LB	John Trollope
MF	Joe Butler
CB	Frank Burrows
CB	Stan Harland
FW	Arthur Horsfield (substituted off) 72'
MF	Roger Smart
MF	John Smith
FW	Peter Noble
FW	Don Rogers
Substitutes:
FW	Chris Jones (substituted in) 72'
Manager:
Fred Ford

Roma relied on attacking tactics in the early stages of the game, forcing Swindon to defend and rely on counter-attack moves to break the dead-lock. The first half was characterised by the many attempts on goal by Roma's centre-forward Enzo saved by Swindon goalkeeper Downsborough.

In the 12th minute Roma were denied a penalty. Peiro had fed a pass through to Cappellini and, as the inside-right cut into the penalty area, he appeared to be sent full-length by a tackle from Harland. Instead of the expected penalty, English referee Kevin Howley gave Swindon a free-kick.

Shortly before half-time, Elvio Salvori, the Roma half back, dived over the outstretched leg of Roger Smart. A penalty was awarded, which Fabio Enzo converted. Just two minutes later, the half-time whistle sounded.

Then, as Salvori broke into the penalty area, he literally threw himself over the outstretched leg of Smart. Much to the dismay of the Town players, the referee immediately awarded a penalty from which Enzo scored.

The second half was more evenly contested, and Swindon equalised through Peter Noble who sliced a chipped free-kick from John Smith just out of the grasp of the Roma goalkeeper, Alberto Ginulfi. Roma responded with a period of concerted attack and were rewarded when Renato Cappellini headed home a cross from a corner, which proved to be the winner. Swindon pressurised the Italian defence for the final 10 minutes of the game but could not equalise, A.S. Roma won 2–1.

=== 2nd leg ===
10 September 1969

Swindon Town	4–0	A.S. Roma
Horsfield 5' (Note: Although a predominant unofficial Swindon Town F.C. website report that the goal was scored in the 15th minute, the Rec.Sport.Soccer Statistics Foundation and the report in the Swindon Advertiser give the time of the goal as the 5th minute.) 70' 89'; Rogers 72'	(report)

County Ground, Swindon
Attendance: 11,978
Referee: B. De Marchi, Italy

Swindon Town	Roma

SWINDON TOWN:
GK	Peter Downsborough
RB	Rod Thomas
LB	John Trollope
MF	Joe Butler
CB	Mick Blick
CB	Stan Harland
FW	Arthur Horsfield (substituted off) 72'
MF	Roger Smart
MF	John Smith
FW	Peter Noble
FW	Don Rogers
Substitutes:
None
Manager:
Fred Ford

A.S. ROMA:
GK	Alberto Ginulfi
DF	Luciano Spinosi
DF	Francesco Scaratti
DF	Francesco Carpenetti
DF	Aldo Bet
DF	Sergio Santarini
MF	Joaquin Luca Peiró
FW	Fabio Enzo (substituted off) 46'
FW	Fausto Landini (substituted off) 66'
MF	Fabio Capello
MF	Franco Cordova
Substitutes:
MF	Elvio Salvori (substituted in) 66'
FW	Giorgio Braglia (substituted in) 46'
Manager:
Helenio Herrera

For the second leg, Roma attempted to hold onto their lead with a defensive formation. It took Swindon five minutes to pull level on aggregate, when Arthur Horsfield volleyed home a cross from John Smith. The game remained at 1–0 until the 70th minute, when Horsfield added his second and Don Rogers scored the third two minutes later.

With Roma pushing forward to get back into the game, Horsfield completed his hat-trick in the 89th minute – meaning Swindon Town had won 4–0 on the night, and 5–2 on aggregate.

The gate receipts were reported as being £8794.19s, equivalent to around £182,840 in 2025.

== Post game ==
Impressed with the competition and spirit of both fans and clubs, the Italian FA organised another Anglo-Italian competition for later the same season. This was to be the 1970 Anglo-Italian Cup, a competition that Swindon Town won. A.S. Roma were later Anglo-Italian Cup champions in 1972.
