= 1969–70 Swindon Town F.C. season =

Swindon Town
1969-70 season
- Manager: Fred Ford
- Ground: County Ground, Swindon
- Division Two: 5th
- FA Cup: Quarter-finals
- League Cup: 3rd round
- Anglo-Italian Cup: Champions
- Anglo-Italian League Cup: Champions
- Top goalscorer: League: Arthur Horsfield (18); All: Arthur Horsfield (28)
- Highest home attendance: 28,520 vs. Blackpool
- Lowest home attendance: 10,221 vs. S.S.C. Napoli
Home colours

The 1969–70 season was Swindon Town's first season in the Division Two after promotion from Division Three in 1969. In what proved to be a historic season for Swindon as the club added to its first major piece of silverware, the League Cup by winning the Anglo-Italian Cup and Anglo-Italian Cup Winners' Cup.

== Second Division ==
| Pos | Team | Pld | W | D | L | GF | GA | GAv | Pts | Qualification or relegation |
|---|---|---|---|---|---|---|---|---|---|---|
| 3 | Leicester City | 42 | 19 | 13 | 10 | 64 | 50 | 1.280 | 51 | |
| 4 | Middlesbrough | 42 | 20 | 10 | 12 | 55 | 45 | 1.222 | 50 | |
| 5 | Swindon Town | 42 | 17 | 16 | 9 | 57 | 47 | 1.213 | 50 | |
| 6 | Sheffield United | 42 | 22 | 5 | 15 | 73 | 38 | 1.921 | 49 | Qualification for the Watney Cup (Note: Sheffield United and Hull City qualified for the Watney Cup as the two teams with the most goals that hadn't already qualified for promotion or a European competition.) |
| 7 | Cardiff City | 42 | 18 | 13 | 11 | 61 | 41 | 1.488 | 49 | Qualification for the Cup Winners' Cup first round (Note: Cardiff City qualified for the European Cup Winners' Cup as the 1969-70 Welsh Cup winners.) |

Rules for classification: 1) Points; 2) Goal average; 3) Goals scored

== Matchday results and line-ups ==
=== Division Three line-ups ===
| Date | Opposition | V | Score | 1 | 2 | 3 | 4 | 5 | 6 | 7 | 8 | 9 | 10 | 11 | 12 |
| 09/08/69 | Blackburn Rovers | A | 0–2 | | | | | | | | | | | | |

_{1} 1st Substitution

=== F.A. Cup line-ups ===
| Date | Opposition | V | Score | 1 | 2 | 3 | 4 | 5 | 6 | 7 | 8 | 9 | 10 | 11 | 12 |
| 03/01/70 | Blackburn Rovers | A | 4–0 | Downsborough | Thomas | Trollope | Butler | Burrows | Harland | Smith | Smart | Horsfield | Noble | Rogers | |
| 24/01/70 | Chester | H | 4–2 | Downsborough | Thomas | Trollope | Butler | Burrows | Harland | Smith | Smart | Horsfield | C. Jones | Rogers | |
| 07/02/70 | Scunthorpe United | H | 3–1 | Downsborough | Thomas | Trollope | Butler | Burrows | Harland | Smith | Smart | Horsfield | Noble | Rogers | |
| 21/02/70 | Leeds United | H | 0–2 | Downsborough | Thomas | Trollope | Butler | Burrows | Harland | Smith | Smart | Horsfield_{1} | Noble | Rogers | C. Jones_{1} |

_{1} 1st Substitution.

=== League Cup line-ups ===
| Date | Opposition | V | Score | 1 | 2 | 3 | 4 | 5 | 6 | 7 | 8 | 9 | 10 | 11 | 12 |
| 02/09/69 | Swansea Town | A | 3–1 | Downsborough | Thomas | Trollope | Butler | Burrows | Harland | Smith | Horsfield | Smart | Noble | Rogers | |
| 24/09/69 | Oxford United | A | 0–1 | Downsborough | Thomas | Trollope | Butler | Burrows | Harland | Smith_{1} | Horsfield | Smart | Noble | Rogers | Penman_{1} |

_{1} 1st Substitution.

=== Anglo-Italian Cup Winners' Cup ===
| Date | Opposition | V | Score | 1 | 2 | 3 | 4 | 5 | 6 | 7 | 8 | 9 | 10 | 11 | 12 |
| 27/08/69 | AS Roma | A | 1–2 | Downsborough | Thomas | Trollope | Butler | Burrows | Harland | Smith | Horsfield_{1} | Smart | Noble | Rogers | C. Jones_{1} |
| 10/09/69 | AS Roma | H | 4–0 | Downsborough | Thomas | Trollope | Butler | Blick | Harland | Smith | Horsfield | Smart | Noble | Rogers | |

_{1} 1st Substitution

=== Anglo-Italian Cup ===
| Date | Opposition | V | Score | 1 | 2 | 3 | 4 | 5 | 6 | 7 | 8 | 9 | 10 | 11 | 12 |
| 02/05/70 | Juventus | H | 4–0 | Downsborough | Thomas | Trollope | Butler | Burrows | Harland | Smith | Smart | Horsfield | Noble | Rogers | |
| 09/05/70 | Napoli | H | 1–2 | R. Jones | Thomas | Trollope | Butler | Burrows | Harland | Smith | Smart | Horsfield | Noble | Rogers | |
| 16/05/70 | Juventus | A | 1–0 | R. Jones | Thomas | Trollope | Butler | Burrows | Harland | Smith | Smart | Horsfield | Noble_{1} | Rogers | C. Jones_{1} |
| 23/05/70 | Napoli | A | 1–0 | R. Jones | Thomas | Trollope | Butler | Burrows | Harland | Smith | Smart | Horsfield | Noble | Rogers | |
| 28/05/70 | Napoli | A | 3–0 | R. Jones | Thomas | Trollope | Butler | Burrows | Harland | Smith | Smart | Horsfield | Noble | Rogers | |

_{1} 1st Substitution and 2nd Substitution.

=== Appearances ===
Last updated 18 August 2014

| No. | Pos | Nat | Player | Total | | Division Two | | FA Cup | | League Cup | | Other | |
| No. | Pos | Nat | Player | Apps | Goals | Apps | Goals | Apps | Goals | Apps | Goals | Apps | Goals |
|---|---|---|---|---|---|---|---|---|---|---|---|---|---|
| | DF | (England) ENG | Mick Blick | 2 | 0 | 1+0 | 0 | 0+0 | 0 | 0+0 | 0 | 1+0 | 0 |
| | DF | (Scotland) SCO | Frank Burrows | 50 | 2 | 38+0 | 2 | 4+0 | 0 | 2+0 | 0 | 6+0 | 0 |
| | MF | (England) ENG | Joe Butler | 55 | 2 | 42+0 | 1 | 4+0 | 1 | 2+0 | 0 | 7+0 | 0 |
| | MF | (England) ENG | David Dangerfield | 1 | 0 | 1+0 | 0 | 0+0 | 0 | 0+0 | 0 | 0+0 | 0 |
| | DF | (England) ENG | Owen Dawson | 4 | 0 | 4+0 | 0 | 0+0 | 0 | 0+0 | 0 | 0+0 | 0 |
| | FW | (England) ENG | David Down | 1 | 0 | 0+1 | 0 | 0+0 | 0 | 0+0 | 0 | 0+0 | 0 |
| | GK | (England) ENG | Peter Downsborough | 51 | 0 | 42+0 | 0 | 4+0 | 0 | 2+0 | 0 | 3+0 | 0 |
| | DF | (England) ENG | Stan Harland | 50 | 0 | 41+0 | 0 | 4+0 | 0 | 2+0 | 0 | 3+0 | 0 |
| | MF | (England) ENG | Don Heath | 17 | 0 | 16+1 | 0 | 0+0 | 0 | 0+0 | 0 | 0+0 | 0 |
| | FW | (England) ENG | Arthur Horsfield | 53 | 28 | 40+0 | 18 | 4+0 | 4 | 2+0 | 0 | 7+0 | 6 |
| | FW | (England) ENG | Chris Jones | 22 | 6 | 9+9 | 5 | 1+1 | 1 | 0+0 | 0 | 0+2 | 0 |
| | GK | (England) ENG | Roy Jones | 4 | 0 | 0+0 | 0 | 0+0 | 0 | 0+0 | 0 | 4+0 | 0 |
| | FW | (England) ENG | Peter Noble | 51 | 21 | 39+0 | 12 | 3+0 | 1 | 2+0 | 3 | 7+0 | 5 |
| | MF | (Scotland) SCO | Willie Penman | 2 | 0 | 1+0 | 0 | 0+0 | 0 | 0+1 | 0 | 0+0 | 0 |
| | FW | (England) ENG | Don Rogers | 49 | 12 | 36+0 | 9 | 4+0 | 1 | 2+0 | 0 | 7+0 | 2 |
| | MF | (England) ENG | Roger Smart | 55 | 5 | 42+0 | 2 | 4+0 | 1 | 2+0 | 0 | 7+0 | 2 |
| | MF | (England) ENG | John Smith | 42 | 3 | 27+2 | 2 | 4+0 | 1 | 2+0 | 0 | 7+0 | 0 |
| | DF | (Wales) WAL | Rod Thomas | 54 | 1 | 41+0 | 1 | 4+0 | 0 | 2+0 | 0 | 7+0 | 0 |
| | DF | (England) ENG | John Trollope | 55 | 3 | 42+0 | 2 | 4+0 | 1 | 2+0 | 0 | 7+0 | 0 |
