= 1968–69 Swindon Town F.C. season =

Swindon Town
1968-69 season
- Manager: Danny Williams
- Ground: County Ground, Swindon
- Division Three: 2nd (Promoted)
- FA Cup: 3rd Round
- League Cup: Champions
- Top goalscorer: League: Don Rogers (22); All: Don Rogers (30)
- Highest home attendance: 28,898 vs. Watford
- Lowest home attendance: 10,594 vs. Walsall
Home colours

The 1968–69 season was Swindon Town's third consecutive season in the Football League Third Division after relegation from Division Two in 1965. In what proved to be a historic season for Swindon as the club won its first major piece of silverware, the League Cup, beating Arsenal by three goals to one. Swindon Town also won promotion to Division Two and competed in the FA Cup.

== Third Division ==
Pos	Team	Pld	W	D	L	GF	GA	GAv	Pts	Promotion or relegation
1	Watford (C)	46	27	10	9	74	34	2.176	64	Promotion to 1969–70 Second Division
2	Swindon Town (P)	46	27	10	9	71	35	2.029	64	Promotion to 1969–70 Second Division
3	Luton Town	46	25	11	10	74	38	1.947	61	
4	Bournemouth & Boscombe Athletic	46	21	9	16	60	45	1.333	51	
5	Plymouth Argyle	46	17	15	14	53	49	1.082	49	

Source: rsssf.com
Rules for classification: 1) points; 2) goal average; 3) number of goals scored.
(C) Champions; (P) Promoted

== Matchday squads ==
=== Division Three line-ups ===
Date	Opposition	V	Score	1	2	3	4	5	6	7	8	9	10	11	12
17/08/68	Stockport County	H	1–0	Downsborough	Thomas	Trollope	Smart	Burrows	Harland	Heath	Noble	Jones	Smith	Rogers	
24/08/68	Hartlepool	A	0–0	Downsborough	Thomas	Trollope_{1}	Smart	Burrows	Harland	Heath	Noble	Jones	Butler	Smith	Penman_{1}
27/08/68	Reading	H	0–0	Downsborough	Thomas	Butler	Smart	Burrows	Harland	Heath	Noble	Jones	Smith	Rogers	
31/08/68	Plymouth Argyle	H	3–0	Downsborough	Dawson	Thomas	Butler	Burrows	Harland	Heath	Smart	Smith	Noble	Rogers	
07/09/68	Watford	A	0–0	Downsborough	Dawson	Thomas	Butler	Burrows	Harland	Heath	Smart	Smith	Noble	Rogers	
14/09/68	Walsall	H	1–0	Downsborough	Dawson	Thomas	Butler	Burrows	Harland	Heath	Smart	Smith	Noble	Rogers	
18/09/68	Bournemouth & Boscombe	A	0–2	Downsborough	Dawson	Thomas	Butler	Burrows	Harland	Heath	Smart	Smith	Noble	Rogers	
21/09/68	Bristol Rovers	A	1–2	Downsborough	Dawson	Thomas	Butler	Blick	Harland	Heath	Smart_{1}	Smith	Noble	Rogers	Jones_{1}
28/09/68	Shrewsbury Town	H	3–0	Downsborough	Dawson	Thomas	Butler	Burrows	Harland	Heath	Noble	Jones	Smith	Rogers	
05/10/68	Orient	H	1–0	Downsborough	Dawson	Thomas	Butler	Burrows	Harland	Heath	Noble	Jones	Smith	Rogers	
09/10/68	Reading	A	1–0	Downsborough	Dawson	Thomas	Butler	Burrows	Harland	Heath_{1}	Smart	Smith	Noble	Rogers	Jones_{1}
12/10/68	Brighton & Hove Albion	A	3–1	Downsborough	Dawson	Thomas	Butler	Burrows	Harland	Rogers	Smart	Jones_{1}	Noble	Smith	Penman_{1}
19/10/68	Torquay United	H	2–1	Downsborough	Dawson_{1}	Thomas	Butler	Burrows	Harland	Heath	Smart	Smith	Noble	Rogers	Penman_{1}
26/10/68	Oldham Athletic	A	3–2	Downsborough	Thomas	Butler	Penman	Burrows	Harland	Heath	Smart	Smith	Noble	Rogers	Jones
02/11/68	Southport	H	5–1	Downsborough	Dawson	Thomas	Penman_{1}	Burrows	Harland	Heath	Smart	Smith	Noble	Rogers	Jones_{1}
09/11/68	Luton Town	A	0–2	Downsborough	Dawson	Thomas	Butler	Burrows	Harland	Heath	Smart	Smith	Noble	Rogers	
23/11/68	Mansfield Town	A	0–2	Downsborough	Dawson	Thomas	Butler	Burrows	Harland	Heath	Smart	Smith	Noble	Rogers	
26/11/68	Northampton Town	A	6–2	Downsborough	Dawson	Thomas	Butler	Blick	Harland	Heath	Smart	Smith	Noble	Rogers	
14/12/68	Brighton & Hove Albion	H	1–0	Downsborough	Dawson	Thomas	Penman	Burrows	Harland	Heath	Smart	Smith	Noble_{1}	Rogers	Jones_{1}
21/12/68	Torquay United	A	1–0	Downsborough	Dawson	Thomas	Butler	Burrows	Harland	Penman	Smart	Smith	Noble_{1}	Rogers	Heath_{1}
26/12/68	Orient	A	0–1	Downsborough	Dawson	Thomas	Butler	Burrows	Harland	Penman_{1}	Smart	Smith	Noble	Rogers	Heath_{1}
11/01/69	Southport	A	1–1	Downsborough	Dawson	Thomas	Butler_{1}	Burrows	Harland	Heath	Penman	Smith	Noble	Rogers	Smart_{1}
18/01/69	Luton Town	H	0–0	Downsborough	Dawson	Thomas	Smart	Burrows	Harland	Heath	Noble	Jones	Penman_{1}	Rogers	Trollope_{1}
24/01/69	Tranmere Rovers	A	5–3	Downsborough	Dawson	Thomas	Butler	Burrows	Harland	Heath	Smart	Jones	Noble	Rogers	
28/01/69	Oldham Athletic	H	5–1	Downsborough	Dawson_{1}	Thomas	Butler	Burrows	Harland	Heath	Smart	Jones	Noble	Rogers	Smith_{1}
01/02/69	Barnsley	A	1–1	Downsborough	Thomas	Trollope	Butler	Burrows	Harland	Jones	Smart	Smith	Noble	Rogers	Heath
04/02/69	Hartlepool	H	1–1	Downsborough	Thomas	Trollope	Butler	Burrows	Harland	Rogers	Smart	Jones	Noble	Smith_{1}	Heath_{1}
15/02/69	Barrow	A	3–0	Downsborough	Thomas	Trollope	Butler	Burrows	Harland	Heath	Smart	Jones	Noble	Rogers	
18/02/69	Tranmere Rovers	H	1–0	Downsborough	Thomas	Trollope	Butler	Burrows	Harland	Heath_{1}	Smart	Jones	Noble	Rogers	Dangerfield_{1}
22/02/69	Rotherham United	H	1–0	Downsborough	Thomas	Trollope	Butler	Burrows	Harland	Smith	Smart	Jones	Noble	Rogers	Blick
25/02/69	Gillingham	H	1–0	Downsborough	Thomas	Trollope	Butler	Burrows	Harland	Smith_{1}	Smart	Jones	Noble	Rogers	Heath_{1}
01/03/69	Northampton Town	H	1–0	Downsborough	Thomas	Trollope	Butler	Burrows	Harland	Heath	Smart	Jones	Noble	Rogers	
05/03/69	Gillingham	A	0–2	Downsborough	Thomas	Trollope	Butler	Burrows	Harland	Heath	Smart	Jones_{1}	Noble	Rogers	Penman_{1}
08/03/69	Stockport County	A	1–2	Downsborough	Thomas	Trollope	Butler	Burrows	Harland	Heath	Smart	Penman	Noble	Rogers	
22/03/69	Plymouth Argyle	A	1–2	Downsborough	Thomas	Trollope	Butler	Burrows	Harland	Heath_{1}	Smart	Smith	Noble	Rogers	Penman_{1}
25/03/69	Barnsley	H	2–0	Downsborough	Dawson	Trollope	Butler	Burrows	Harland	Penman	Smart	Smith	Noble	Rogers	
29/03/69	Watford	H	0–1	Downsborough	Thomas	Trollope	Butler	Burrows	Harland	Dawson_{1}	Smart	Smith	Noble	Rogers	Penman_{1}
04/04/69	Crewe Alexandra	A	2–1	Downsborough	Thomas	Trollope	Butler	Burrows	Harland	Heath	Smart	Smith	Noble	Rogers	
05/04/69	Shrewsbury Town	A	1–1	Downsborough	Thomas	Trollope	Butler	Burrows	Harland	Heath	Dawson	Smith	Noble	Rogers	
08/04/69	Bournemouth & Boscombe	H	3–0	Downsborough	Thomas	Trollope	Butler	Burrows	Harland	Heath	Smart	Smith	Noble	Rogers	
12/04/69	Bristol Rovers	H	2–2	Downsborough	Thomas	Trollope	Butler	Burrows	Harland	Heath	Smart	Smith	Noble	Rogers	Penman
15/04/69	Crewe Alexandra	H	1–0	Downsborough	Dawson	Thomas	Butler	Burrows	Harland	Heath_{1}	Smart	Smith	Noble	Rogers	Penman_{1}
19/04/69	Walsall	A	2–0	Downsborough	Dawson	Thomas	Butler	Burrows	Harland	Penman	Smart	Smith	Noble	Rogers	
22/04/69	Mansfield Town	H	1–0	Downsborough	Dawson	Thomas	Butler	Burrows	Harland	Penman	Smart	Smith	Noble	Rogers	
02/05/69	Rotherham United	A	1–1	Downsborough	Dawson	Thomas	Butler	Burrows	Harland	Heath_{1}	Penman	Smith	Noble	Rogers	Jones_{1}
05/05/69	Barrow	H	2–0	Downsborough	Dawson	Trollope	Butler	Burrows	Harland	Smith	Penman	Jones	Noble	Rogers	

_{1} 1st Substitution

=== F.A. Cup line-ups ===
Date	Opposition	V	Score	1	2	3	4	5	6	7	8	9	10	11	12
16/11/68	Canterbury City	A	1–0	Downsborough	Dawson	Thomas	Butler	Burrows	Harland	Heath	Smart	Smith	Noble	Rogers	Jones
07/12/68	Grantham	A	2–0	Downsborough	Dawson	Thomas	Butler	Burrows	Harland	Rogers	Smart	Jones	Penman	Smith	
04/01/69	Southend United	H	0–2	Downsborough	Dawson	Thomas	Trollope_{1}	Burrows	Harland	Heath	Smart	Smith	Noble	Rogers	Penman_{1}

_{1} 1st Substitution.

=== League Cup line-ups ===
Date	Opposition	V	Score	1	2	3	4	5	6	7	8	9	10	11	12
13/08/68	Torquay United	H	2–1	Downsborough	Thomas	Trollope	Smart	Burrows	Harland	Heath	Noble	Jones	Smith	Rogers	
04/09/68	Bradford City	A	1–1	Downsborough	Dawson	Thomas	Butler	Burrows	Harland	Heath	Smart	Smith	Noble	Rogers	
10/09/68	Bradford City	H	4–3	Downsborough	Dawson	Thomas	Butler	Burrows_{1}	Harland	Heath	Smart	Smith	Noble	Rogers	Jones_{1}
24/09/68	Blackburn Rovers	H	1–0	Downsborough	Dawson	Thomas	Butler	Blick	Harland	Heath	Noble	Jones	Smith	Rogers	
16/10/68	Coventry City	A	2–2	Downsborough	Dawson	Thomas	Butler	Burrows	Harland	Heath	Smart	Smith	Noble	Rogers	
21/10/68	Coventry City	H	3–0	Downsborough	Butler	Thomas	Penman	Burrows	Harland	Heath	Smart	Smith	Noble	Rogers	
30/10/68	Derby County	A	0–0	Downsborough	Butler_{1}	Thomas	Penman	Burrows	Harland	Heath	Smart	Smith	Noble	Rogers	Dawson_{1}
05/11/68	Derby County	H	1–0	Downsborough	Dawson	Thomas	Butler	Burrows	Harland	Heath	Smart	Smith	Noble	Rogers	
20/11/68	Burnley	A	2–1	Downsborough	Dawson	Thomas	Butler	Burrows	Harland	Heath	Smart	Smith	Noble	Rogers	
04/12/68	Burnley	H	1–2	Downsborough	Dawson	Thomas	Butler	Burrows	Harland	Heath	Smart	Smith	Noble	Rogers	
18/12/68	Burnley	A	3–2	Downsborough	Dawson	Thomas	Butler	Burrows	Harland	Heath_{1}	Smart	Smith	Noble	Rogers	Penman_{1}
15/03/69	Arsenal	N	3–1	Downsborough	Thomas	Trollope	Butler	Burrows	Harland	Heath	Smart	Smith_{1}	Noble	Rogers	Penman_{1}

_{1} 1st Substitution.

=== Appearances ===
Last updated 18 August 2014

No.	Pos	Nat	Player	Total		Division Three		FA Cup		League Cup	
No.	Pos	Nat	Player	Apps	Goals	Apps	Goals	Apps	Goals	Apps	Goals
	DF	(England) ENG	Mick Blick	2	0	2+0	0	0+0	0	0+0	0
	DF	(Scotland) SCO	Frank Burrows	58	1	44+0	1	3+0	0	11+0	0
	MF	(England) ENG	Joe Butler	55	1	42+0	1	2+0	0	11+0	0
	MF	(England) ENG	David Dangerfield	1	0	0+1	0	0+0	0	0+0	0
	DF	(England) ENG	Owen Dawson	41	0	29+0	0	3+0	0	8+1	0
	GK	(England) ENG	Peter Downsborough	61	0	46+0	0	3+0	0	12+0	0
	DF	(England) ENG	Stan Harland	61	2	46+0	1	3+0	0	12+0	1
	MF	(England) ENG	Don Heath	52	2	34+4	2	2+0	0	12+0	0
	FW	(England) ENG	Chris Jones	27	8	18+5	7	1+0	1	2+1	0
	FW	(England) ENG	Peter Noble	60	20	46+0	16	2+0	0	12+0	4
	MF	(Scotland) SCO	Willie Penman	26	2	13+7	1	1+1	0	2+2	1
	FW	(England) ENG	Don Rogers	60	30	45+0	22	3+0	1	12+0	7
	MF	(England) ENG	Roger Smart	55	15	40+1	9	3+0	0	11+0	6
	MF	(England) ENG	John Smith	54	11	38+1	7	3+0	1	12+0	3
	DF	(Wales) WAL	Rod Thomas	59	0	44+0	0	3+0	0	12+0	0
	DF	(England) ENG	John Trollope	23	1	19+1	1	1+0	0	2+0	0
