= Mick Blick =

English footballer

Personal information
- Full name: Michael Robert Blick
- Date of birth: 20 September 1948 (age 78)
- Place of birth: Berkeley, Gloucestershire, England
- Position: Centre back

Youth career
- 1964–1966: Swindon Town

Senior career*
Years	Team	Apps	(Gls)
1966–1971	Swindon Town	8	(0)
- Corby Town
- * Club domestic league appearances and goals

Michael Robert Blick (born 20 September 1948) is an English former footballer who played in the Football League for Swindon Town playing as a centre back.

Blick replaced Frank Burrows in the starting line-up to play in the 2nd leg of the 1969 Anglo-Italian League Cup versus AS Roma. A game that Swindon Town won 4–0 (5–2 on aggregate).

== Honours ==
Swindon Town

- English Football League Cup: 1968–1969
- Anglo-Italian League Cup: 1969
- Anglo-Italian Cup: 1970
