= 1970 Anglo-Italian Cup =

Football competition

The 1970 Anglo-Italian Cup was the inaugural Anglo-Italian Cup competition. The European football competition was played between clubs from England and Italy and was founded by Gigi Peronace in 1970, following the success of the Anglo-Italian League Cup. The competition culminated in a final between Napoli and Swindon Town. Swindon won the competition after leading in the final which was abandoned before full-time due to violence.

== Background ==
The Football League Cup was changed in 1967 so that the winner would additionally receive a place in the Inter-Cities Fairs Cup. However, when Queens Park Rangers won the final that year, they were in the Third Division and, at that time, UEFA did not allow third-tier teams to compete in the Inter-Cities Fairs Cup. When another Third Division club, Swindon Town, won the 1969 Football League Cup, the Anglo-Italian League Cup was organised as a way of compensating Swindon for the ruling that prevented them competing in the Inter-Cities Fairs Cup, and Swindon won a two-legged match against that year's Coppa Italia champions A.S. Roma. Following the popularity of that event, and as a way to generate income to pay players' wages during the extended close season caused by the 1970 FIFA World Cup, the first Anglo-Italian Cup was inaugurated the following season.

== Format ==
For the competition there were six English teams: Swindon Town, Sheffield Wednesday, Middlesbrough, West Bromwich Albion, Sunderland and Wolverhampton Wanderers, and six Italian teams: Napoli, Juventus, Roma, Fiorentina, Lazio and Vicenza. These teams were split into three groups consisting of two English and two Italian teams each. Each team played against the two teams in their group from the opposing nation. Matches were played home and away with the first legs played in England and the second legs played in Italy. Two points were awarded for a win, one point for a draw, and a point for each goal scored. The team with the highest number of points from each nation then contested the final.

== Group stage ==
| Group | England | Italy |
|---|---|---|
| 1 | Sheffield Wednesday; Swindon Town | S.S.C. Napoli; Juventus |
| 2 | Middlesbrough; West Bromwich Albion | Lanerossi; A.S. Roma |
| 3 | Sunderland; Wolverhampton Wanderers | ACF Fiorentina; S.S. Lazio |

=== Group 1 games ===
| Sheffield Wednesday (England) | 4–3 | (Italy) SSC Napoli |
|---|---|---|
| Alan Warboys; Steve Downes |

Hillsborough
Attendance: 10,166

| Swindon Town (England) | 4–0 | (Italy) Juventus |

| Sheffield Wednesday (England) | 0–0 | (Italy) Juventus |

Hillsborough
Attendance: 9,495

| Swindon Town (England) | 1–2 | (Italy) SSC Napoli |

| SSC Napoli (Italy) | 5–1 | (England) Sheffield Wednesday |

| Juventus (Italy) | 0–1 | (England) Swindon Town |

| Juventus (Italy) | 2–0 | (England) Sheffield Wednesday |

| SSC Napoli (Italy) | 0–1 | (England) Swindon Town |

=== Group 2 games ===
| Middlesbrough (England) | 1–0 | (Italy) A.S. Roma |

| West Bromwich Albion (England) | 0–0 | (Italy) L.R. Vicenza |

| West Bromwich Albion (England) | 4–0 | (Italy) A.S. Roma |

| Middlesbrough (England) | 2–0 | (Italy) L.R. Vicenza |

| L.R. Vicenza (Italy) | a–a (Note: The match was abandoned after 75 minutes with Vicenza leading 1–0. The result was awarded as a 2–0 loss against both teams.) | (England) West Bromwich Albion |

| A.S. Roma (Italy) | 1–1 | (England) Middlesbrough |

| L.R. Vicenza (Italy) | 2–2 | (England) Middlesbrough |

| A.S. Roma (Italy) | 1–1 | (England) West Bromwich Albion |

=== Group 3 games ===
| Sunderland (England) | 3–1 | (Italy) S.S. Lazio |

| Wolverhampton Wanderers (England) | 2–1 | (Italy) ACF Fiorentina |

| Sunderland (England) | 2–2 | (Italy) ACF Fiorentina |

| Wolverhampton Wanderers (England) | 1–0 | (Italy) S.S. Lazio |

| ACF Fiorentina (Italy) | 1–3 | (England) Wolverhampton Wanderers |

| S.S. Lazio (Italy) | 2–1 | (England) Sunderland |

Referee: Harold Hackney

| S.S. Lazio (Italy) | 2–0 | (England) Wolverhampton Wanderers |

| ACF Fiorentina (Italy) | 3–0 | (England) Sunderland |

=== Final team standings ===
Italian teams

| Team | Pld | W | D | L | GF | GA | Pts (Note: Two points were awarded for a win, one point for a draw, and a point for each goal scored.) |
|---|---|---|---|---|---|---|---|
| S.S.C. Napoli | 4 | 2 | 0 | 2 | 10 | 7 | 14 |
| ACF Fiorentina | 4 | 1 | 1 | 2 | 7 | 7 | 10 |
| S.S. Lazio | 4 | 2 | 0 | 2 | 5 | 5 | 9 |
| Juventus | 4 | 1 | 1 | 2 | 2 | 5 | 5 |
| Lanerossi Vicenza | 4 | 0 | 2 | 2 | 2 | 6 | 4 |
| A.S. Roma | 4 | 0 | 2 | 2 | 2 | 7 | 4 |

English teams

| Team | Pld | W | D | L | GF | GA | Pts |
|---|---|---|---|---|---|---|---|
| Swindon Town | 4 | 3 | 0 | 1 | 7 | 2 | 13 |
| Middlesbrough | 4 | 2 | 2 | 0 | 6 | 3 | 12 |
| Wolverhampton Wanderers | 4 | 3 | 0 | 1 | 6 | 4 | 12 |
| West Bromwich Albion | 4 | 1 | 2 | 1 | 5 | 3 | 9 |
| Sunderland | 4 | 1 | 1 | 2 | 6 | 8 | 9 |
| Sheffield Wednesday | 4 | 1 | 1 | 2 | 5 | 10 | 8 |

== Final ==
28 May 1970

| Napoli (Italy) | 0 – 3 (abandoned 79 mins) | (England) Swindon Town |
|---|---|---|
| | | Noble 24' 58'; Horsfield 62' |

Stadio San Paolo, Naples
Attendance: 55,000
Referee: Paul Schiller (Austria)

Napoli: (Note: Where no article exists on English Wikipedia, some players are linked to their article on the Italian Wikipedia)
| GK | (Italy) Trevisani |
| DF | (Italy) Floris |
| DF | (Italy) Montecolo |
| DF | (Italy) Zurlini |
| DF | (Italy) Panzanato |
| MF | (Italy) Bianchi |
| MF | (Sweden) Hamrin |
| MF | (Italy) Montefusco |
| FW | (Italy) Altafini |
| MF | (Italy) Improta |
| FW | (Italy) Barison |
Substitutes:
None listed
Manager:
(Italy) Giuseppe Chiappella

Swindon Town
| GK | (England) Jones |
| DF | (Wales) Thomas |
| DF | (England) Trollope |
| MF | (England) Butler |
| DF | (Scotland) Burrows |
| DF | (England) Harland (c) |
| MF | (England) Smart |
| FW | (England) Horsfield |
| MF | (England) Smith |
| MF | (England) Noble |
| MF | (England) Rogers |
Substitutes:
None listed
Manager:
(England) Fred Ford

Swindon continued their spell of success with a comfortable victory to add to the 1969 League Cup and 1969 Anglo-Italian League Cup.

The game was marred by disturbances from the Napoli fans, resulting in two separate pitch invasions until finally – under a barrage of missiles – the referee abandoned the match after 79 minutes.

Trouble started when Arthur Horsfield scored Swindon's third goal in the 63rd minute. Disgruntled fans, angered at the home side's failure to check brilliant Swindon, hurled a fusillade of rocks and bottles on the field, prompting the police to retaliate with teargas. Groups of youngsters then started breaking up stones and wooden benches and hurling them over the wide moat and onto the pitch. A linesman was struck and the referee ordered the players towards the main stand as clearly it was impossible for play to carry on. The players had to run the gauntlet to escape to the dressing rooms and several Swindon players were struck by missiles. Horsfield, in particular, had a nasty bruise on his thigh. – Peter Sheldon

Swindon Town were awarded the trophy by Signor Orfeo Pianelli, vice-president of the Italian Football Federation.

== Post game ==
The Swindon Evening Advertiser reported on the aftermath -

"A fanatical section of the 55,000 crowd incensed by the inability of Napoli to match the craft and finishing of Swindon Town, went berserk during the latter stage of the Anglo-Italian tournament final in Naples last night. They showered the pitch with beer bottles and stones and Austrian referee Paul Schiller called the players off 11 minutes from time" Reuters

Only minutes from the end of the game in Naples, with Swindon holding a comfortable three-goal lead, raging fans went on the rampage. Hundreds of concrete bench seats were torn up and smashed into small chunks which were thrown onto the pitch sending players and officials scurrying to the other side of the field for safety. Fires were started all around the stadium as the hooligans raged out of control. Bottles and blazing cushions were thrown as the match dissolved in chaos 12 minutes from full-time. Swindon Advertiser

"After the fighting, in which at least 40 police, including several officers, and 60 demonstrators were injured, police guarded the San Paolo Stadium. Police said they had arrested 30 people and had 11 others in custody for questioning. According to first estimates, rampaging spectators caused about £20,000 worth of damage to stadium equipment." Reuters
