= Peter Downsborough =

English footballer (1943–2019)

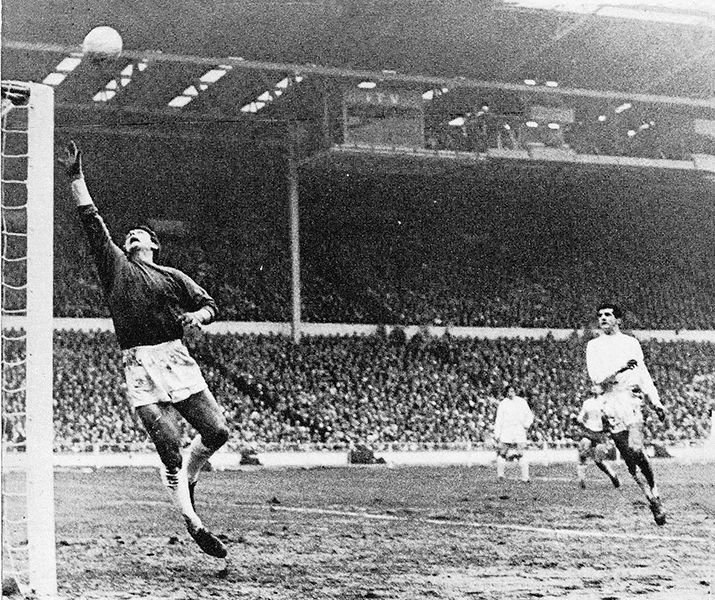

Personal information
- Full name: Peter Downsborough
- Date of birth: 13 September 1943
- Place of birth: Halifax, England
- Date of death: 26 September 2019 (aged 76)
- Position: Goalkeeper

Senior career*
Years	Team	Apps	(Gls)
1960–1965	Halifax Town	148	(0)
1965–1973	Swindon Town	274	(0)
1973	→ Brighton and Hove Albion (loan)	3	(0)
1973–1978	Bradford City	225	(0)
Total		650	(0)
- * Club domestic league appearances and goals

Peter Downsborough (13 September 1943 – 26 September 2019) was an English professional footballer who played as a goalkeeper.

== Career ==
A centre forward as a schoolboy, he transferred into the role of goalkeeper after deputising for an injured teammate during a school match.

Downsborough made his League debut for his local side Halifax Town just before his 17th birthday and went on to play in 148 games in total before being signed for Swindon Town by Danny Williams.

He made his Swindon debut in the first game of the 1965/66 season, keeping a clean sheet against local rivals Oxford United at the County Ground.

With his assistance, Swindon made it to the 1969 League Cup Final against Arsenal at Wembley Stadium. Widely regarded by players and press as his finest moment, Downsborough pulled off save after save and prevented the higher division club from scoring for 86 minutes.

"for quarter of an hour it was Downsborough versus Arsenal and Downsborough won." Geoffrey Green - The Times

"During the 90 minutes even the most die-hard Swindon fans would have agreed we deserved an equaliser, We hit the woodwork and Peter Downsborough was just unbelievable. I had quite a lot of saves to make but not like he had." Bob Wilson - Arsenal goalkeeper

"On the occasions they did find gaps in the Town rearguard, their efforts were not good enough to beat goalkeeper Downsborough, who was in superb form. Time and again he leapt out to punch away dangerous corner kicks, and two of his saves from direct shots were breathtaking" Clive King - Swindon Advertiser

An error in the 86th minute of the game saw Arsenal equalise through a Bobby Gould header, Downsborough attempted to clear the ball from the edge of the penalty area only to kick it against the Arsenal player and launch the ball into the air. Gould calmly followed the ball's progress and scored easily.

"It was my fault. I take the blame for it. I started to come off my line and then stopped. As the ball came to me I was late on it and kicked it straight at Bobby's foot. I was on the floor, the ball rebounded over my head and left Bobby with an easy header into the empty net. I remember wishing that the ground would open up and swallow me. I thought to myself that the one mistake could have cost us the League Cup. After all that hard work in 90 minutes of football it could have been my one moment of madness that cost Swindon the trophy. I could not believe that I had done a thing like that." Peter Downsborough

Swindon beat Arsenal against the odds in extra time and Downsborough was voted Town Player of the Year by the supporters.

He asked to be placed on the transfer list in 1972 believing that players such as himself who had been at the club a long time were not being rewarded as well as newcomers. Current manager Les Allen dropped him from the team as a result and eventually loaned out to Brighton and Hove Albion for 3 games, he returned to Swindon team for the final 13 games of the 1972/73 season to help the side avoid relegation.

He was transferred to Bradford City before the start of the 1973-74 season and made 225 appearances before retiring in 1978. He kept a clean-sheet in his final game for the club, a 6–0 victory against Crewe Alexandra.

In 1999, he had returned to his home town of Halifax and was working as a school caretaker.

He died on 26 September 2019 at the age of 76.

On 12 October 2019, before a League Two matchup between Swindon and Plymouth Argyle, there was a minute-long tribute to Downsborough.

== Honours ==
Swindon Town

- Football League Cup: 1968–69
- Anglo-Italian League Cup: 1969
- Anglo-Italian Cup:1970

Individual

- Swindon Town Player of the Year: 1969
