= Arthur Horsfield =

English footballer (born 1946)

Personal information
- Date of birth: 5 July 1946 (age 80)
- Place of birth: Newcastle, England
- Position: Striker

Youth career
- Middlesbrough

Senior career*
Years	Team	Apps	(Gls)
1963–1969	Middlesbrough	111	(51)
1969	Newcastle United	9	(3)
1969–1972	Swindon Town	108	(41)
1972–1975	Charlton Athletic	139	(53)
1975–1977	Watford	78	(16)
1977	Dartford		
- * Club domestic league appearances and goals

Arthur Horsfield (born 5 July 1946) is an English former footballer who played as a striker.

== Career ==
Horsfield was born in Newcastle upon Tyne, Northumberland, England. He joined Middlesbrough as an apprentice – "I was in my local under eleven's side at the age of nine, and Joe Soones, the Boro scout was the first one on the scene, knocking on my door and turning up at the matches." – and eventually made 111 appearances for the club scoring 51 league goals and helping them win promotion to the Second Division in the 1966–67 season. During his time at the club he was also included in the England Youth international team.

After an acrimonious period at Middlesbrough, he left the club in January 1969 after a heated exchange with the then manager Stan Anderson.

'When I left, it stemmed from being dropped again after we got beat 0–3 at Bristol City (January 1969). I was really angry and lost my rag. I went into Stan's office and had a right go at him. I remember we were still 'exchanging views' after I had stormed out of his office and was on my way down the stairs! (laughs) When I'd got to the bottom he shouted out "If you don't f****** like it, you know what to do!" So I shouted back "yeah, well you can have it from me in writing tomorrow morning." Don't get me wrong, I did actually get on well with Stan, but I was young and feeling frustrated.'

He moved to Newcastle United but only appeared as a substitute, being kept out of the first team by Welsh international Wyn Davies. He scored 3 times in his 9 appearances and attracted interest from that year's League Cup winners Swindon Town.

Danny Williams signed Horsfield to the Wiltshire club in 1969 for £17,500 (the club's record signing at the time), one of his last actions at the club. By the end of his first season he had become the club's top scorer with 22 goals.

He took part in Swindon Town's European cup winning games scoring a hat-trick against AS Roma to win the 1969 Anglo-Italian League Cup and also the winning goal against SSC Napoli to win the 1970 Anglo-Italian Cup.

In June 1972 he moved to Charlton Athletic (another record signing), here he scored 53 goals in 139 appearances.

"Danny Williams left Swindon Town soon after I joined and was replaced by Fred Ford. Then Dave Mackay who was playing for Swindon Town at that time, took over and he wanted to bring in his own players. Anyway, he brought in Ray Treacy from Charlton Athletic for a club record fee. When I came back for pre-season training he told me that he'd sold me to Charlton Athletic; I was not happy. [...] In the end though, I really enjoyed my time at Charlton Athletic. All those appearances I made for them were consecutive you know – I never missed a match in three years."

Whilst Arthur was playing at Charlton Athletic he also coached football at St. Austin's Secondary School, Highcombe, Charlton SE7.

During his time at Charlton Arthur scored one of Match of the Day's Goals of the Month.

His League career came to end at Watford, who he had signed for in 1975. Again, he was upset at the nature of the signing –

In my last year at Charlton Athletic I moved to centre-half. That year we got promoted, and then at the beginning of the following season Andy Nelson, who had taken over from Theo, phoned me and told me he had sold me to Watford. [...] I was put under some pressure to go to Watford, and various people I spoke to advised me to ask for outrageous wages in the hope that they would knock me back. [...] By that time, I'd got it through my mind that I wanted to be a centre half, rather than a centre forward because I was getting a bit fed up with being kicked up in the air all the time. It was then that I picked up the only bookings of my career. I was only booked about four times in my whole career, all at centre half while I was at Watford. I didn't really enjoy my time there. I was disillusioned with the way I came to be there. I thought it was wrong that I was phoned up at home to be told that I was meeting their manager the next morning – a 'thanks and goodbye' type of attitude. I dug my heels in, but because they agreed to my wage demand, I had to go."

Graham Taylor's appointment as manager in 1977 caused friction between them, with Taylor requesting that all players live within 10 minutes of the ground. Horsfield, who lived in Kent, had signed to Watford on the understanding that he wouldn't be asked to move home so as to not interrupt his children's schooling.

Taylor eventually offered Horsfield a coaching job, which he declined –

"Taylor did ask me if I would consider taking the reserve coach job, but at the time I felt that I was too young to give up playing, as I was only 29. It came as a shock to me at the time, but looking back, maybe it was a missed opportunity. I had taken a coaching badge at Middlesbrough when I was 17, along with Bobby Braithwaite, Eddie Connachan and Taffy Orrit, but I wasn't ready to do it full time."

After being contacted by Watford chairman Elton John's uncle; former Nottingham Forest cup-finalist Roy Dwight, he transferred to Dartford to play in the Southern League.

"Dartford had a lot of problems, and nearly went out of existence, but bounced back later. At the time though, they ended up selling the ground, and houses were built on it. I had a street, Horsfield Close, named after me."

He retired in 1977 and as of 2000 he was a manager for Parcel Force in Thurrock.

== Hounours ==
Swindon Town

- Anglo-Italian League Cup: 1969
- Anglo-Italian Cup: 1970
