= 1969 Football League Cup final =

- Match programme
- Event: 1968–69 Football League Cup
Arsenal	Swindon Town
1	3
- After extra time
- Date: 15 March 1969
- Venue: Wembley Stadium, London
- Referee: William Handley (Cannock)
- Attendance: 98,189

The 1969 Football League Cup final took place on 15 March 1969 at Wembley Stadium. It was the ninth final and the third to be played at Wembley. It was contested between Arsenal and Swindon Town.

== Pre-match ==
First Division Arsenal had lost the previous season's final to Leeds United and were aiming to do better in their second successive appearance. Swindon Town, on the other hand, were considered the underdogs, being two divisions below Arsenal in the Third Division and were appearing in their first League Cup final and indeed their first match at Wembley.

However, with eight Arsenal players suffering from flu (which had led to their match the previous weekend being postponed) and the pitch deteriorating badly due to heavy rain circumstances did not favour Arsenal's short-ball game.

As both sides' colours clashed, League Cup rules stated that both would have to play in their alternative kits. Arsenal wore their yellow and dark blue strip, and Swindon Town opted to wear an all-white kit instead of their usual alternative of all-blue.

== Match ==
Arsenal began the game by putting Swindon's defence under heavy pressure early on, resulting in a series of early corners as Arsenal attempted to finish the game quickly. Swindon's attacking play was kept to a minimum by Arsenal's more experienced and better conditioned defence and the game developed into a one-way affair.

However, the first goal came from Swindon in the 35th minute, against the run of play, scored by Roger Smart. A mix-up between defender Ian Ure and goalkeeper Bob Wilson over a backpass led to confusion in the Arsenal defence, and allowed Smart to capitalise and score. Swindon maintained their 1–0 lead until half-time.

The second half was again one-sided, with Swindon's tactics being those of all-out defence to protect their lead. Swindon goalkeeper Peter Downsborough prevented numerous Arsenal players from scoring, including saving efforts that looked unstoppable from Jon Sammels and Bob McNab.

Until the 86th minute, it seemed that a great football upset was sure to occur; however Swindon goalkeeper Downsborough tried to claim a ball and fumbled, allowing Bobby Gould to equalise with a header and take the game into extra time.

Swindon dominated extra time, with the heavy pitch and illnesses tiring the opposition. A header from Smart rebounded off the post after beating the Arsenal goalkeeper. From the resulting corner, Don Rogers became a Swindon hero just before the first period of extra time was over; Arsenal failed to clear the corner and in the resulting goalmouth melée Rogers coolly controlled the loose ball and fired it from close range into the net.

Arsenal responded by changing to all-out attack during the second period. However, Ure lost the ball in the Swindon half to Smart, and Arsenal were caught on the counter-attack by a long ball from Smart to Rogers, who receiving the ball midway between the halfway line and Arsenal's penalty area, ran unopposed all the way, rounded Wilson and sealed victory for Swindon in the 109th minute.

== Post-match ==
Arsenal initially claimed that the heavy pitch and illnesses were a major contributing factor to the shock loss.

"I'm not attempting to make any excuses because I thought Swindon were terrific on the day, but six of us had flu and it didn't help that the pitch was cut up so badly. I certainly don't think the game would have gone ahead today. I performed very strongly for the 90 minutes but then when it got to extra-time my legs just went completely." Frank McLintock

However, in recent years some players have identified the game as the impetus for Arsenal's later successes in the Inter-Cities Fairs Cup of 1970, their first European competition cup, and their first League and FA Cup double in 1971.

"It's never going to remain the happiest day of my life but I will go to the grave telling people that what we achieved in the years following that League Cup defeat we owe to Swindon. There were certain players who dropped by the wayside, but those who were part of the abuse we got from the London press – who thought there was no way we could lose to a Third Division side – used it as a spur." Bob Wilson

National newspapers reported the story the following day under headlines such as "The shame of Arsenal", for example:

"Arsenal, slaves of their own system, methodical but utterly predictable, were finally unhinged by the individual brilliance and flair of the Swindon stars – the small town Cinderellas whom cynics expected to lose to the North London favourites by a bucketful of goals."

"And there could have been a fourth to add to their goal total. A drive from Trollope was sailing into the Arsenal net when it struck the referee, and all Swindon got was a corner."

Swindon Town returned to Wiltshire to a heroes' welcome. On Sunday 16 March, a crowd of 8,000 gathered in Regent's Circus as the players emerged onto the balcony of the Town Hall. The Mayor, Alf Bown, raised a glass to the club and called for "promotion", which Swindon achieved after failing to lose any of their nine remaining matches. A draw at Rotherham United saw the team promoted into the Second Division.

Despite being League Cup winners, Third Division Swindon were ineligible for a place in the following season's Fairs Cup as only First Division clubs were eligible to compete.

The Anglo-Italian and Anglo Italian League Cups were created in lieu of a proper European competition for the club to compete in. Swindon went on to win the Anglo-Italian League Cup in 1969 and the Anglo-Italian Cup in 1970.

== Match facts ==
15 March 1969
15:30 BST

Arsenal	1–3 (a.e.t.)	Swindon Town
Gould 86'	Report	Smart 35'; Rogers 104', 119'

Wembley Stadium, London
Attendance: 98,189
Referee: Bill Handley (Cannock)

Arsenal	Swindon Town

ARSENAL:
GK	1	(Scotland) Bob Wilson
FB	2	(England) Peter Storey
LB	3	(England) Bob McNab
CB	4	(Scotland) Frank McLintock (c)
CH	5	(Scotland) Ian Ure
CB	6	(England) Peter Simpson	(substituted off) 71'
ST	7	(England) John Radford
CM	8	(England) Jon Sammels
MF	9	(England) David Court
FW	10	(England) Bobby Gould
LM	11	(England) George Armstrong
Substitutes:
CM		(Scotland) George Graham	(substituted on) 71'
Manager:
(England) Bertie Mee

SWINDON TOWN:
GK	1	(England) Peter Downsborough
DF	2	(Wales) Rod Thomas
LB	3	(England) John Trollope
RB	4	(England) Joe Butler
CH	5	(Scotland) Frank Burrows
CH	6	(England) Stan Harland (c)
OR	7	(England) Don Heath
IF	8	(England) Roger Smart
WH	9	(England) John Smith	(substituted off) 77'
FW	10	(England) Peter Noble
LW	11	(England) Don Rogers
Substitutes:
CF		(Scotland) Willie Penman	(substituted on) 77'
Manager
(England) Danny Williams

Match rules

- 90 minutes
- 30 minutes extra-time if necessary.
- Match replayed if scores still level.
- One named substitute.

== Road to Wembley ==
Home teams listed first. Information taken from and

=== Arsenal ===
Round 1: Bye

Round 2: Arsenal 1–0 Sunderland

Round 3: Scunthorpe United 1–6 Arsenal

Round 4: Arsenal 2–1 Liverpool

Round 5: Arsenal 5–1 Blackpool

Semi-final:

1st Leg: Arsenal 1–0 Tottenham Hotspur
2nd Leg: Tottenham Hotspur 1–1 Arsenal
Agg Score: Arsenal 2–1 Tottenham Hotspur

=== Swindon Town ===
Round 1: Swindon Town 2–1 Torquay United

Round 2: Bradford City 1–1 Swindon Town

Replay: Swindon Town 4–3 Bradford City

Round 3: Swindon Town 1–0 Blackburn Rovers

Round 4: Coventry City 2–2 Swindon Town

Replay: Swindon Town 3–0 Coventry City

Round 5: Derby County 0–0 Swindon Town

Replay: Swindon Town 1–0 Derby County

Semi-final:

1st Leg: Burnley 1–2 Swindon Town
2nd Leg: Swindon Town 1–2 Burnley
Replay: Burnley 2–3 Swindon Town
Agg Score: Burnley 5–6 Swindon Town
