= John Trollope (footballer) =

English footballer (born 1943)

John Trollope MBE
Personal information
- Full name: Norman John Trollope
- Date of birth: 14 June 1943 (age 83)
- Place of birth: Wroughton, England
- Position: Left-back

Senior career*
Years	Team	Apps	(Gls)
1960–1980	Swindon Town	770	(22)

Managerial career
- 1981–1983: Swindon Town
- * Club domestic league appearances and goals

Norman John Trollope MBE (born 14 June 1943) is a former footballer, manager and coach who served Swindon Town in various capacities for nearly 40 years. Trollope previously held the record for the number of Football League appearances made for one club - turning out for the Town in 770 games between 1960 and 1980, an achievement which saw him appointed Member of the Order of the British Empire (MBE) in the 1978 Birthday Honours.

== Playing career ==
Trollope made his debut for the club on 20 August 1960 in a 1–1 draw with Halifax Town, when he was aged seventeen and missed two matches that season. Trollope was an ever-present in the side in the 1962–63 season - a trend which continued for seven seasons. A run of 368 consecutive matches was brought to an end in August 1968 when he sustained a broken arm in a match at Hartlepool United. He did not return to the team until January - by which time he had missed most of Swindon's League Cup run. He only appeared in the competition twice that season - in the first game against Torquay United, and in the final at Wembley, where Swindon beat Arsenal 3–1.

Trollope continued to be a regular member of the side right up until the 1978–79 season, when he made sixteen appearances. He retired at the end of the season and moved into the club's backroom staff. However, after an appalling start to the 1980–81 season, Trollope returned to playing and broke the appearance record previously set at 764 appearances by Portsmouth's Jimmy Dickinson. He finally retired from the playing staff at the end of that season.

== Managerial career ==
Following his retirement from playing, Trollope replaced Bobby Smith as the club's manager early in the following season. His time as manager was far from successful - working on a shoestring budget, he led Swindon to their first ever relegation to Fourth Division. He was replaced by Ken Beamish near the end of the 1982–83 season.

Even this was not the end of Trollope's times at Swindon; he was appointed assistant manager to Lou Macari during Easter 1985 and he took charge of the youth team under Ossie Ardiles, Glenn Hoddle, John Gorman and Steve McMahon before finally leaving the club in 1996. His time on the coaching staff took in Swindon's climb from the old Fourth Division to the Premier League between 1986 and 1993, although by the time he left they had suffered two consecutive relegations and were on the verge of another promotion. He would later work for Wolverhampton Wanderers, before returning to Swindon in 2008 to take up the role of Under 15's coach in the Centre of Excellence.

== Personal life ==
Trollope's son Paul became a professional footballer who played for Wales internationally, before becoming a manager.

In August 2025, Trollope had a statue unveiled at Swindon Town's community foundation.

== Career statistics ==
Appearances and goals by club, season and competition
Club	Season	League			FA Cup		League Cup		Anglo-Italian Cup		Total	
Club	Season	Division	Apps	Goals	Apps	Goals	Apps	Goals	Apps	Goals	Apps	Goals
Swindon Town	1960–61	Third Division	44	0	3	0	3	0	0	0	50	0
Swindon Town	1961–62	Third Division	46	1	2	0	3	0	0	0	51	1
Swindon Town	1962–63	Third Division	46	1	4	0	2	0	0	0	52	1
Swindon Town	1963–64	Second Division	42	0	3	0	4	0	0	0	49	0
Swindon Town	1964–65	Second Division	42	2	1	0	1	0	0	0	44	2
Swindon Town	1965–66	Third Division	46	3	3	0	1	0	0	0	50	3
Swindon Town	1966–67	Third Division	46	2	8	0	5	1	0	0	59	3
Swindon Town	1967–68	Third Division	46	2	4	0	2	0	0	0	52	2
Swindon Town	1968–69	Third Division	20	1	1	0	2	0	0	0	23	1
Swindon Town	1969–70	Second Division	42	2	4	1	2	0	7	0	55	3
Swindon Town	1970–71	Second Division	39	0	2	0	3	0	4	0	48	0
Swindon Town	1971–72	Second Division	42	1	1	0	1	0	0	0	44	1
Swindon Town	1972–73	Second Division	34	1	2	0	1	0	0	0	37	1
Swindon Town	1973–74	Second Division	36	0	2	1	3	0	0	0	41	1
Swindon Town	1974–75	Third Division	46	2	5	0	1	0	0	0	52	2
Swindon Town	1975–76	Third Division	46	1	5	1	4	2	0	0	55	4
Swindon Town	1976–77	Third Division	35	1	7	0	0	0	0	0	42	1
Swindon Town	1977–78	Third Division	40	1	4	0	6	1	0	0	50	2
Swindon Town	1978–79	Third Division	18	0	0	0	2	0	0	0	20	0
Swindon Town	1979–80	Third Division	0	0	0	0	0	0	0	0	0	0
Swindon Town	1980–81	Third Division	14	0	0	0	1	0	0	0	15	0
Career total			770	21	61	3	47	4	11	0	889	28

== Honours ==
Swindon Town

- Football League Cup: 1968–69
- Anglo-Italian League Cup: 1969
- Anglo-Italian Cup: 1970
