= Elvio Salvori =

Italian footballer and coach (born 1944)

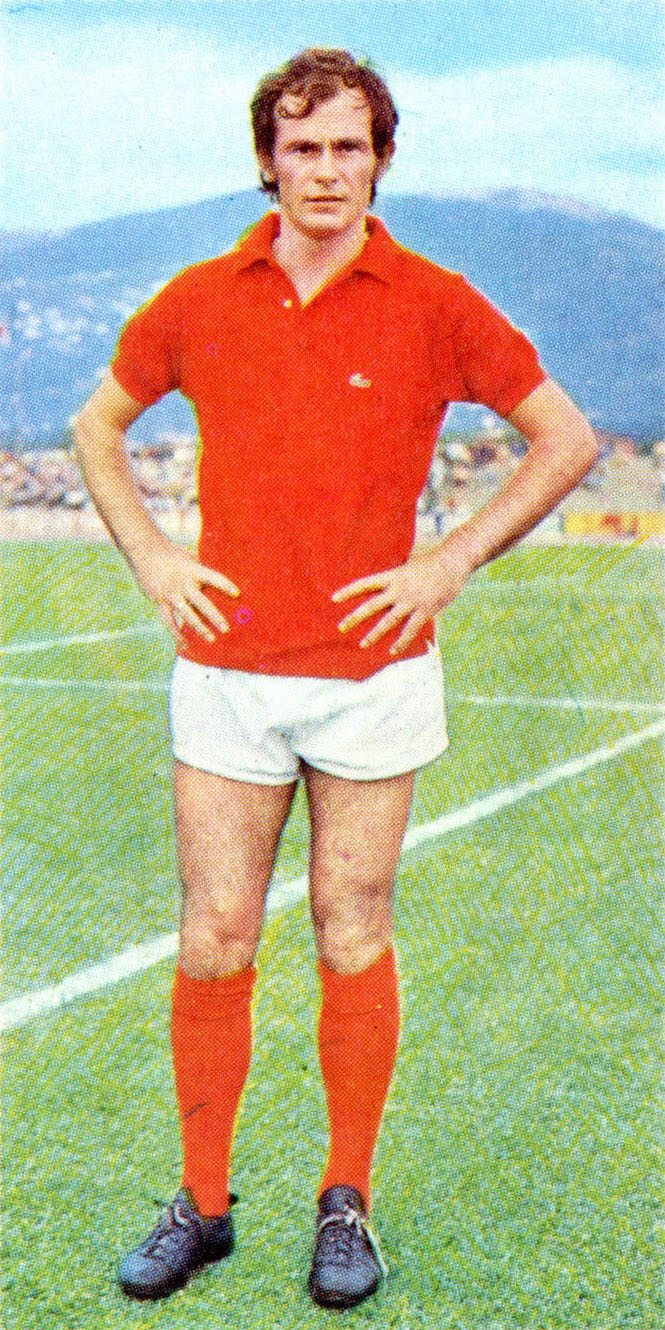
- Salvori with Roma in 1970

Personal information
- Date of birth: 3 June 1944 (age 82)
- Place of birth: Noventa di Piave, Italy
- Height: 1.78 m (5 ft 10 in)
- Position: Defender

Team information
- Current team: Triestina (youth manager)

Senior career*
Years	Team	Apps	(Gls)
1961–1963	Udinese	15	(4)
1963–1964	Fiorentina	5	(0)
1964–1966	Roma	28	(0)
1966–1968	Atalanta	50	(5)
1968–1973	Roma	9	(0)
1973–1974	Foggia	78	(0)
1974–1977	Ascoli	62	(0)
1977–1979	Chieti	80	(0)
1979–1982	Grosseto	30	(0)
1982–1983	Civitavecchia		

Managerial career
- 1983–1984: Viterbese
- 1984–1986: Matera
- 1986–1987: Carbonia
- 1987–1988: Treviso
- 1988–1990: Carbonia
- 1991–1992: Rieti
- 1992–1993: Sandonà
- 1993–1995: Selargius
- 1996–2002: Cagliari (youth)
- 2002–2003: Villacidrese
- 2003–2004: Tempio
- 2007–: Triestina (youth)
- * Club domestic league appearances and goals

Elvio Salvori (born 3 June 1944) is an Italian professional football coach and a former player who played as a defender. He currently manages the youth team of U.S. Triestina Calcio.

== Career ==
Throughout his career, Salvori played 14 seasons (279 games, 12 goals) in the Italian Serie A, for Udinese Calcio, ACF Fiorentina, A.S. Roma, Atalanta B.C., U.S. Foggia and Ascoli Calcio 1898.

== Honours ==
Roma

- Coppa Italia: 1968–69
- Anglo-Italian Cup: 1971, 1972
