= Alberto Ginulfi =

Italian footballer (1941–2023)

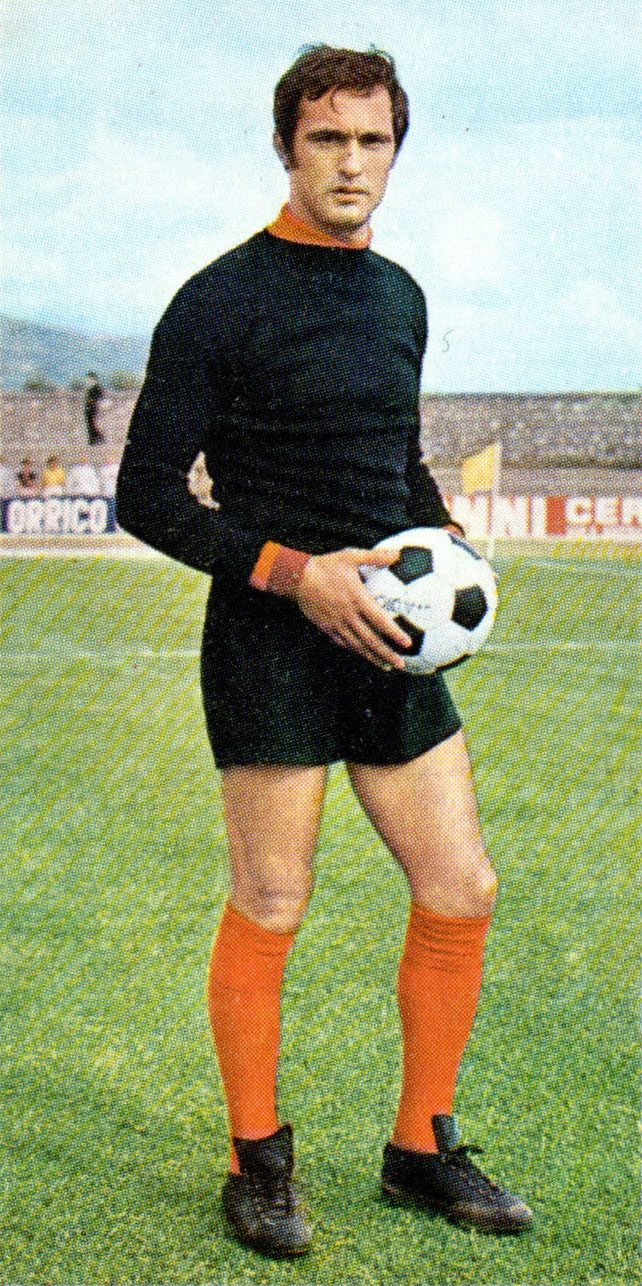
- Ginulfi with Roma in 1970

Personal information
- Date of birth: 30 November 1941
- Place of birth: Rome, Italy
- Date of death: 6 September 2023 (aged 81)
- Height: 1.80 m (5 ft 11 in)
- Position: Goalkeeper

Senior career*
Years	Team	Apps	(Gls)
1961–1962	Tevere Roma		
1962–1975	Roma	157	(0)
1975–1976	Verona	30	(0)
1976–1977	Fiorentina	1	(0)
1977–1978	Cremonese	30	(0)
- * Club domestic league appearances and goals

Alberto Ginulfi (30 November 1941 – 6 September 2023) was an Italian professional footballer who played as a goalkeeper.

== Career ==
Ginulfi played for 12 seasons (188 games) in the Serie A for Italian clubs A.S. Roma, Hellas Verona F.C., and ACF Fiorentina, winning two Coppa Italia and an Anglo-Italian Cup with Roma.

Ginulfi was one of the very few goalkeepers who could boast that he saved a penalty kick by Brazilian former footballer Pelé - widely regarded as one of the greatest footballers of all time. Ginulfi saved the penalty in a friendly match between Roma and Santos on 3 March 1972.

== Style of play ==
Ginulfi was considered an extremely consistent and modern goalkeeper for his time.

== Death ==
Alberto Ginulfi died on 6 September 2023, at the age of 81.

== Honours ==
Roma

- Coppa Italia: 1963–64, 1968–69
- Anglo-Italian Cup: 1971–72
