= David Court (footballer) =

English footballer and coach

Personal information
- Full name: David John Court
- Date of birth: 1 March 1944 (age 82)
- Place of birth: Mitcham, Surrey, England
- Positions: Right winger; right back; wing half

Youth career
- 1959–1962: Arsenal

Senior career*
Years	Team	Apps	(Gls)
1962–1970	Arsenal	175	(17)
1970–1972	Luton Town	52	(0)
1972–1973	Brentford	12	(1)
1973–?	Barnet		
Total		239	(18)
- * Club domestic league appearances and goals

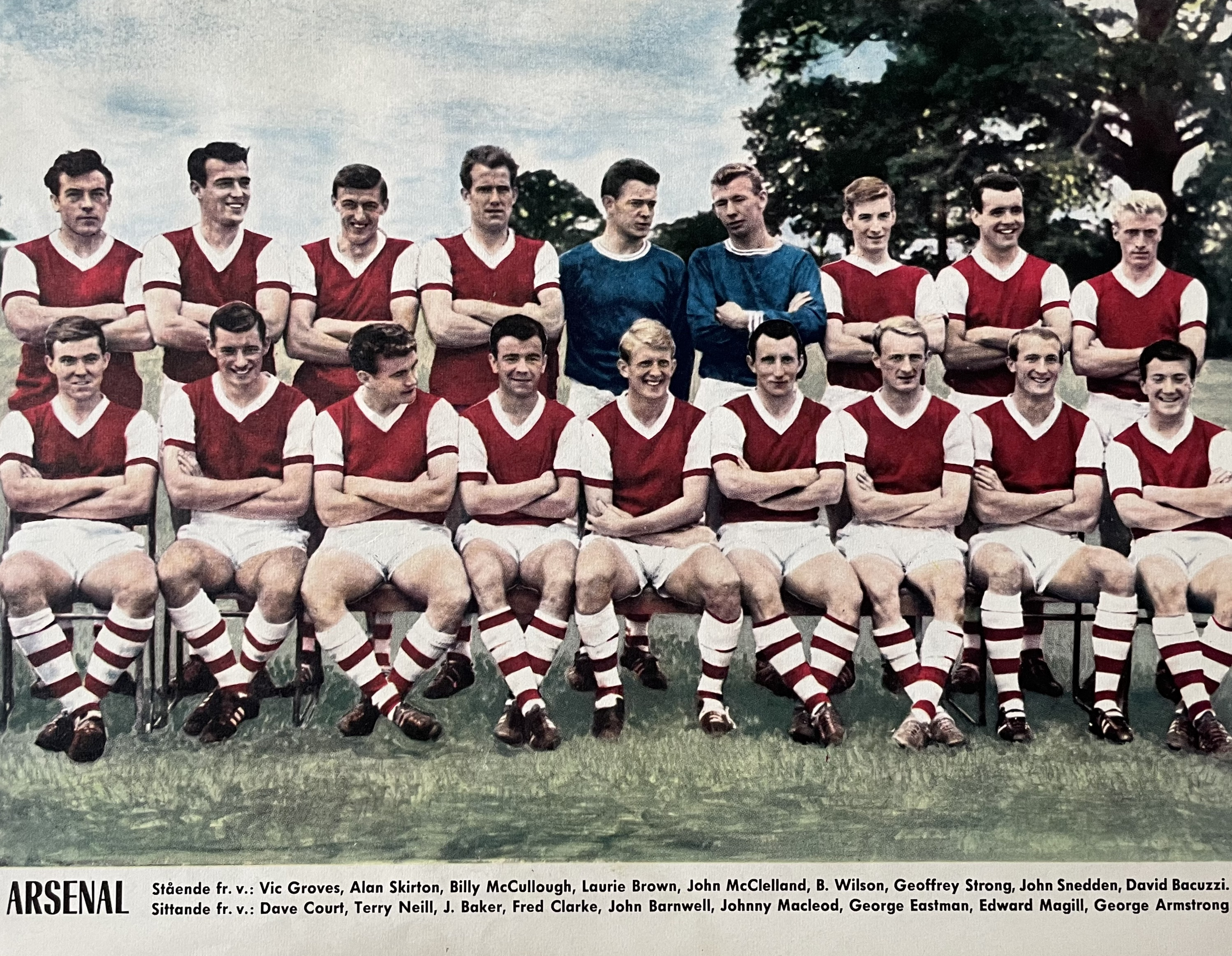
Arsenal F.C. in 1964, David Court sits to the far left of the bench.

David John Court (born 1 March 1944) is an English former footballer, now turned coach.

== Career ==
Court joined Arsenal as a schoolboy in 1959, turning professional in January 1962. Initially a centre forward or inside forward, he was a regular goalscorer for Arsenal's' youth and reserve sides. He made his first-team debut against Aston Villa on 10 September 1962, in a 2–1 defeat and went on to make fourteen league appearances over the next two seasons.

At the start of the 1964–65 season, Arsenal manager Billy Wright switched Court to the right wing, and he became a regular there for that season, playing 35 times, before being switched to right back in 1965–66, where again he was a regular for the season, playing 38 times. Wright was dismissed as Arsenal manager and many players left the club as a result, but Court continued to stay at the club for the next three seasons as a utility player.

Court played every position bar goalkeeper under Wright's successor Bertie Mee, although he played fewer matches – a total of only 31 over Mee's first two seasons. However, 1968–69 saw him return as a first-team regular – he played 51 matches that season, including Arsenal's' League Cup Final loss to Swindon Town at Wembley Stadium.

He continued to be a regular in 1969–70, until he suffered injury midway through, and as a result he missed both legs of Arsenal's' Inter-Cities Fairs Cup final triumph that season. In July 1970 Arsenal accepted a £30,000 bid for him from Luton Town; in all he had played 204 matches for Arsenal, and had scored 18 goals. He spent two seasons with Luton, before seeing out his career at Brentford. He played non league football at Barnet before retiring.

After retiring from football, he worked in the financial sector, before returning to Arsenal in 1996 as Assistant Head of Youth Development, alongside Liam Brady, and has remained in the job since.

== Honours ==
Arsenal

- Football League Cup runner-up: 1968–69
