= Willie Penman (footballer, born 1939) =

Scottish footballer and manager

Personal information
- Full name: William Salmond Thomson Penman
- Date of birth: 7 August 1939
- Place of birth: East Wemyss, Fife, Scotland
- Date of death: December 2017 (aged 78)
- Position: Inside forward

Youth career
- St Andrews United

Senior career*
Years	Team	Apps	(Gls)
1960–1962	Rangers	3	(0)
1962–1966	Newcastle United	63	(18)
1966–1970	Swindon Town	98	(18)
1970–1973	Walsall	123	(6)
- Dundalk
1974	Seattle Sounders	13	(1)
Total		300	(43)
- * Club domestic league appearances and goals

William Salmond Thomson Penman (7 August 1939 – December 2017) was a Scottish footballer, who played for Rangers, Newcastle United, Swindon Town, Walsall, Dundalk and Seattle Sounders. Penman was a used substitute as Swindon won the Football League Cup in 1968–69.

He later managed for a season at Cheltenham Town in 1973. He then played in the NASL for Seattle Sounders.

Penman died in December 2017.

== Honours ==
Swindon Town

- Football League Cup: 1968–69
