= Stan Harland =

English footballer and manager (1940–2001)

Personal information
- Full name: Stanley Clarence Harland
- Date of birth: 19 June 1940
- Place of birth: Liverpool, England
- Date of death: 30 August 2001 (aged 61)
- Place of death: Tintinhull, Somerset, England
- Position: Centre half

Youth career
- New Brighton

Senior career*
Years	Team	Apps	(Gls)
1959–1961	Everton	0	(0)
1961–1964	Bradford City	120	(20)
1964–1966	Carlisle United	77	(7)
1966–1971	Swindon Town	237	(6)
1971–1975	Birmingham City	38	(0)
1975–1978	Yeovil Town		

Managerial career
- 1975–1978: Yeovil Town
- * Club domestic league appearances and goals

Stanley Clarence Harland (19 June 1940 – 30 August 2001) was an English football centre half.

== Career ==
Born in Liverpool, Harland's football career began at local club New Brighton. It was from here that he attracted interest from Everton who signed him in 1959. Harland moved to Bradford City where he scored 20 goals in 120 league games for the club before being transferred to Carlisle United.

Carlisle won promotion to the Second Division in his first season with the club, Harland played in every game. The arrival of Gordon Marsland saw him lose his first team place and he asked for a transfer.

Harland signed for Swindon Town on 29 July 1966, the day before England beat West Germany in the World Cup Final at Wembley, after Swindon manager Danny Williams and chief scout Jack Conley sat outside Carlisle's ground (Brunton Park) overnight to make sure of his signature.

Harland debuted for the team in the first game of the 1966–67 season against Brighton and Hove Albion, a 2–2 draw. He scored his first goal for the club in a 2–3 defeat to Walsall the following season and was voted 1967-68 Player of the Season. His partnerships with Mel Nurse and later Frank Burrows helped Swindon to reach their successes of the 1960s, forming an effective defence. Harland became team captain on Nurse's departure in 1968 after being ever-present in the first team since his début. As captain, he received the League Cup after defeating Arsenal at Wembley Stadium in 1969.

Harland lost his captaincy and position to Dave Mackay when he joined Swindon in 1971, manager Fred Ford gave him the role of auxiliary defender but Harland was dropped from the team when Mackay took over Coaching of the club as player-manager. His last game for Swindon was a win away at Burnley on 27 November 1971, he assisted the team in ending a six-game run without a victory. Even though he was named Man of the Match, he was sold to Birmingham City for £15,000.

Harland made 38 appearances for Birmingham, helping them win promotion to the First Division in 1972 and reach the FA Cup semi-final of the same year. His career was ended through injury although he moved to become player-manager of Yeovil Town and later worked with Frank Burrows at Portsmouth in a coaching capacity.

Harland was married to an ice-dancing champion and had two daughters, he also often played in the Professional Footballers' Golf Championship. After leaving football he worked in the Supermarket business and continued working up until his death from a heart attack on 30 August 2001 in Tintinhull, Somerset.

== Honours ==
Carlisle United

- Football League Third Division: 1964–65

Swindon Town

- Football League Third Division promotion: 1968–69
- Football League Cup: 1968–69
- Anglo-Italian League Cup: 1969
- Anglo-Italian Cup: 1970

Birmingham City

- Football League Second Division promotion: 1971–72
