= Fabio Enzo =

Italian footballer (1946–2021)

Personal information
- Date of birth: 22 June 1946
- Place of birth: Cavallino-Treporti, Italy
- Date of death: 11 January 2021 (aged 74)
- Place of death: San Donà di Piave, Italy
- Height: 1.87 m (6 ft 2 in)
- Position: Striker

Senior career*
Years	Team	Apps	(Gls)
1963–1964	Venezia	0	(0)
1964	Salernitana	6	(0)
1964–1965	Tevere Roma	29	(9)
1965–1969	Roma	36	(8)
1967–1968	→ Mantova (loan)	29	(8)
1969–1971	Cesena	57	(15)
1971	Napoli	0	(0)
1972	Verona	10	(0)
1972–1974	Novara	67	(27)
1974–1975	Foggia	16	(1)
1975–1976	Reggina	31	(10)
1976–1977	Venezia	10	(2)
1977–1978	Omegna	33	(9)
1978–1979	Biellese	26	(8)
1979–1980	Foggia	9	(2)
1981–1983	Biellese	51	(27)
Total		410	(86)
- * Club domestic league appearances and goals

Fabio Enzo (22 June 1946 – 11 January 2021) was an Italian professional footballer who played as a striker. He was born in Cavallino-Treporti.

== Career ==
Enzo played for four seasons (46 games, 8 goals) in the Serie A for A.S. Roma and Hellas Verona F.C.

== Honours ==
Roma

- Coppa Italia: 1968-1969

== Death ==
He died from complications from COVID-19 during the COVID-19 pandemic in Italy.
