= Bobby Gould =

English former footballer and manager

Personal information
- Full name: Robert Alfred Gould
- Date of birth: 12 June 1946 (age 80)
- Place of birth: Coventry, England
- Position: Striker

Senior career*
Years	Team	Apps	(Gls)
1963–1968	Coventry City	82	(40)
1968–1970	Arsenal	65	(16)
1970–1971	Wolverhampton Wanderers	40	(18)
1971–1972	West Bromwich Albion	52	(18)
1972–1973	Bristol City	35	(15)
1973–1975	West Ham United	51	(15)
1975–1977	Wolverhampton Wanderers	34	(13)
1977–1978	Bristol Rovers	36	(12)
1978–1979	Hereford United	45	(13)
Total		440	(160)

Managerial career
- 1978: Aalesunds FK
- 1981: Chelsea (caretaker)
- 1981–1983: Bristol Rovers
- 1983–1984: Coventry City
- 1985–1987: Bristol Rovers
- 1987–1990: Wimbledon
- 1991–1992: West Bromwich Albion
- 1992–1993: Coventry City
- 1995–1999: Wales
- 2000: Cardiff City
- 2003: Cheltenham Town
- 2009: Weymouth
- * Club domestic league appearances and goals

Robert Alfred Gould (born 12 June 1946) is an English former footballer and manager.

As a striker, Gould started his career at Coventry City, and played at Arsenal, Wolverhampton, West Bromwich Albion, Bristol City, West Ham, and Bristol Rovers. He helped the Sky Blues win the Second Division title in 1966–67. With West Ham United, he picked up a winners' medal in the 1975 FA Cup Final as a non-playing substitute. He also helped Wolverhampton to win the Second Division title in 1976–77.

As a coach, Gould led the Norwegian side Aalesunds FK, Bristol Rovers, Coventry City, Wimbledon, Queen's Park Rangers, and West Bromwich Albion. Gould is most known for his achievements with Wimbledon. In his first season, the unfancied Wimbledon beat Liverpool to clinch the 1988 FA Cup final at Wembley. Gould later became coach of the Welsh national team for 4 years. Gould was the manager and general manager of Cardiff City, as well as the manager of Cheltenham Town and Weymouth. Gould is also a regular presenter and pundit on Talksport, and appears each Friday on the Andy Goldstein Sports Bar programme.

== Early life ==
Robert Alfred Gould was born in Wyken, Warwickshire, on 12 June 1946. He is the son of Henry Gould and Helen McKellar Gould (née Morton). He spent his youth living in Wyken and attended Caludon Castle School for his secondary education.

== Playing career ==
Gould started his football career at Coventry City, making his debut for the club whilst still an apprentice at the age of 16. He did not sign professional until June 1964. A striker, he scored 40 goals in 82 league games for the Sky Blues, helping them to win the Second Division title in 1966–67.

He moved to Arsenal in February 1968 for £90,000. He could not hold down a regular place in the Arsenal first team, although he did score a headed goal in the 1969 League Cup Final against Swindon Town, to send the game into extra time; Arsenal went on to lose 3–1.

Gould played no part in Arsenal's European Fairs Cup 1969–70 final win and by the end of 1969–70 was on the sidelines at Arsenal. He made two appearances and scored a goal earlier in the cup run against Glentoran.

In June 1970 Gould was transferred to Wolves for a fee of £55,000, and made his debut against Newcastle United in August 1970, but after just 15 months he was signed by West Bromwich Albion manager Don Howe for £66,666. He made his Albion debut at home to Ipswich Town in the same month, and partnering Jeff Astle in attack, went on to score 12 goals in his first season at the Hawthorns. In all he scored 19 goals in 60 appearances for Albion, but when his form began to wane he was sold to Bristol City for £68,888 in December 1972.

Gould joined West Ham United in November 1973 for an £80,000 fee, and picked up a winners' medal in the 1975 FA Cup Final as a non-playing substitute. He re-joined Wolves for £30,000 in December 1975 and helped them to win the Second Division title in 1976–77. He moved on to Bristol Rovers for £10,000 in October 1977, assuming the role of player-coach. Between January and April 1978 Gould coached the Norwegian side Aalesunds FK, and joined Hereford United as player-coach for £10,000 in September of the same year.

== Management and coaching career ==
=== Club management (1979–1993) ===
Gould joined Chelsea as assistant manager to Geoff Hurst in 1979. When Hurst was sacked in April 1981, Gould took charge of first team affairs for the final two games of the season, before leaving the club shortly afterwards.

Gould began his managerial career with Bristol Rovers in October 1981 before returning to Coventry City as boss in May 1983. He remained there until he was sacked on 28 December 1984. The highlight of this spell at Coventry came on 10 December 1983 when his unfancied Coventry side achieved a 4–0 win over Liverpool, the top English club side of the time who went on to win the league title, League Cup and European Cup that season. He made a swift return to management after accepting an offer to return to Bristol Rovers.

Gould is most famous for his achievements with Wimbledon. He moved to the South Londoners in the summer of 1987 after their first season as a First Division club, in which they had finished sixth. His first season brought one of the most famous FA Cup victories in history, when his unfancied Wimbledon side beat Liverpool to clinch the 1988 FA Cup final at Wembley. They also finished seventh in the league. Gould is famous for adopting the technique of, as he says, "goal keepers who can kick the ball 90 yards and a 6-foot 2 bloke to head it in!", he said jokingly on Talksport with Andy Goldstein.

Gould remained with the Dons for two more seasons before quitting to make way for his assistant Ray Harford. In December 1990, Gould returned to football as assistant manager to Don Howe at Queen's Park Rangers – a role reversal of the management team that they had formed at Wimbledon. Gould lasted just two months at Loftus Road before accepting an offer to become manager of West Bromwich Albion.

But he was unable to prevent them from suffering relegation to the old Third Division at the end of the 1990–91 season – the first time that Albion had slipped to such depths. In 1991–92, Albion just missed out on the playoffs in their first season as a Third Division club and Gould left in June 1992 to join Coventry, his former club. Ironically, Howe was working at Coventry by this time and the pair were joint managers, but Howe stepped down before the season began to leave Gould in sole charge.

He remained at Coventry City until October 1993, when he resigned despite defying all the odds and keeping them clear of relegation from the Premiership. In his first season, they had been fourth in the league as late as January before a late season dip in form saw them finish 15th. Earlier in the season he had paid Newcastle United £250,000 for striker Mick Quinn, who was among the top scorers in the first-ever Premier League season with 17 goals. He also oversaw a thrilling 5–1 victory in the league over Liverpool, and the following season they began with a similarly impressive 3–0 win over Arsenal at Highbury.

=== International management (1995–1999) ===
His next stop was with the Welsh national team. He became national coach in June 1995 but quit four years later after their failure to qualify for the 1998 FIFA World Cup and UEFA Euro 2000. Gould was not at all highly regarded by the Welsh fans, following questionable tactics and major fallings out with players such as Nathan Blake, when Blake refused to play after accusing Gould of making a racist remark in training, as well as Mark Hughes. Gould also engaged in a wrestling bout with John Hartson. A comical incident occurred early in the career of Robbie Savage when Savage jokingly threw a replica of Paolo Maldini's shirt away on Sky Sports before a match against Italy. Gould initially dropped Savage from the squad for disrespecting Maldini, only to reinstate him the next day. Gould's final match was a 4–0 defeat to Italy in which he allegedly instructed Mark Hughes "not to tackle the Italians as they'll only dive".

=== Back to club football (2000–2003) ===
In August 2000, Gould was named as manager of Division Three side Cardiff City. But two months later he handed over his duties to Alan Cork and was promoted to the role of general manager. After seeing the Bluebirds win promotion at the end of 2000–01 he left Ninian Park to seek a return to management.

Gould's final full-time managerial post came in February 2003 when he took over at Division Two strugglers Cheltenham Town. Despite his efforts, Cheltenham were unable to avoid relegation back to Division Three and Gould resigned soon after the 2003–04 campaign was underway, following a run of six defeats in seven games. Gould was unpopular with the fans throughout the start of 2003–04, resulting in a demonstration after the home match with Rochdale during which he came out to announce that he had resigned.

=== Other roles in football (since 2004) ===
Gould is a regular presenter and pundit on Talksport, and appears each Friday on the Andy Goldstein Sports Bar programme, where he is colloquially known as "The Gouldfather".

=== Return to club football ===
Gould was appointed as manager of Weymouth in the Conference National on 12 April 2009 for the final five games of the season. In his first game in charge Gould led Weymouth to a 1–1 draw with Forest Green Rovers which ended an 11-game losing streak, but he was unable to save them from relegation to the Conference South.

== Personal life ==
Married to Marjorie since 1968, the couple have two sons Jonathan (born 1968) and Richard (born 1970).

Matt Gould, Bobby's grandson, is a goalkeeper who has represented Spennymoor Town and Altrincham.

== Honours ==
=== Player ===
Coventry City

- Football League Second Division: 1966–67

Arsenal

- Football League Cup runner-up: 1968–69

Wolverhampton Wanderers

- Football League Second Division: 1976–77

West Ham United

- FA Cup: 1974–75

=== Manager ===
Bristol Rovers

- Gloucestershire Cup: 1982, 1983

Wimbledon

- FA Cup: 1987–88
