= Roger Smart =

English footballer

Personal information
- Full name: Roger Smart
- Date of birth: 25 March 1943 (age 83)
- Place of birth: Swindon, England
- Position: Inside forward

Youth career
- 1959–60: Swindon Town

Senior career*
| Years | Team | Apps | (Gls) |
| 1960–73 | Swindon Town | 341 | (43) |
| 1973–74 | Charlton Athletic | 30 | (1) |
- Bath City
- Trowbridge Town
- * Club domestic league appearances and goals

Roger Smart (born 25 March 1943]) is an English retired footballer who played as an inside forward.

He made his way from schoolboy teams to work up through the youth ranks at Swindon Town before making his début in the reserves in April 1960.

He signed as a professional for the club in May 1960 but did not play first team football until March 1962. He scored his first goal for Swindon in a match with Queens Park Rangers on 1 September.

Smart was relegated to the reserves for much of the 1962–63 season, before being recalled for the final three games of the season. He scored in each of these games and assured Swindon's promotion to Division 2 for the first time in their history.

In 1965 he became the first nominated substitute to be used in a Swindon Town game.

Over the next few seasons, Smart became a first-team regular, moving into a role that allowed fellow striker Don Rogers to excel. Smart's best form came in 1968/69, when he scored fifteen goals. Six of these came in the League Cup campaign, including the opening goal in the 1969 League Cup Final, when he benefited from a mistake in the Arsenal defence before bundling the ball into the net. He created Swindon's second and third goals, both scored by Rogers. He was also a part of the 1970 Anglo-Italian Cup and Anglo-Italian League Cup winning sides.

In the twilight of his Town career, Smart moved back into a wing-half or midfield position. He left Swindon at the end of the 1972/73 season, and joined Charlton Athletic on a free transfer.

He returned to the Swindon area a year later, with spells at Bath City and Trowbridge Town before retiring. As of 1999 he was landlord of the Plough Inn in Old Town, Swindon.

Roger lives with his partner Lin, on the southern outskirts of Swindon.

== Honours ==
Swindon Town

- Football League Cup: 1968–69
- Anglo-Italian League Cup: 1969
- Anglo-Italian Cup: 1970
