= Bob Wilson (footballer, born 1941) =

Scottish footballer and broadcaster

Bob Wilson OBE
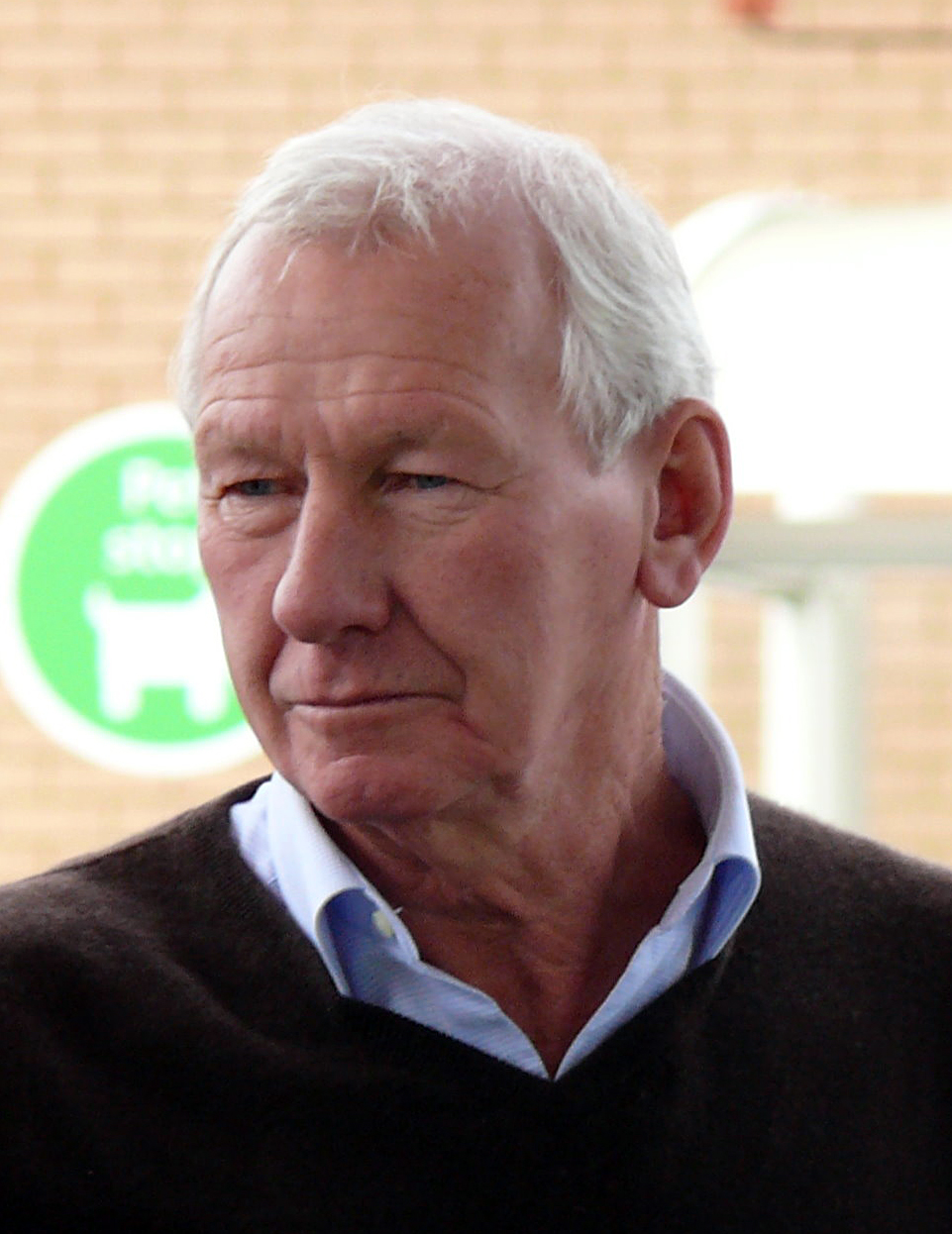
- Wilson in 2009

Personal information
- Full name: Robert Primrose Wilson
- Date of birth: 30 October 1941 (age 84)
- Place of birth: Chesterfield, England
- Position: Goalkeeper

Senior career*
| Years | Team | Apps | (Gls) |
| 1961–1963 | Wolverhampton Wanderers | 0 | (0) |
| 1963–1974 | Arsenal | 310 | (0) |
| 1978 | Næstved IF | 7 | (0) |

International career
| 1971 | Scotland | 2 | (0) |
- * Club domestic league appearances and goals

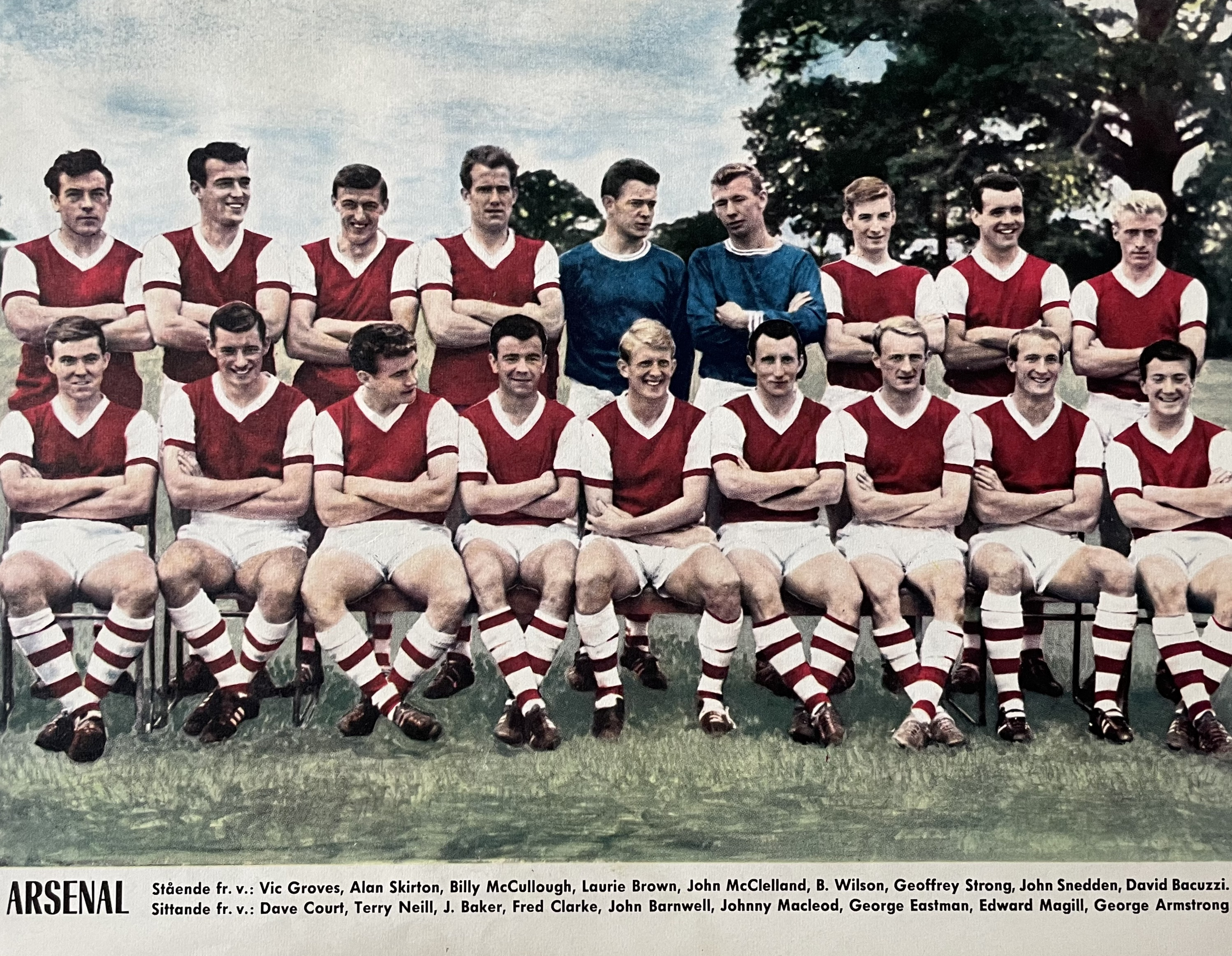
Arsenal F.C. in 1964, Bob Wilson (blue/white dress) standing sixth player to the right.

Robert Primrose Wilson OBE (born 30 October 1941) is a former Scotland international football goalkeeper and later broadcaster / anchorman.

As a player, Wilson spent 11 years at Arsenal, where he made over 300 appearances. He also featured as a youth and senior international for Scotland. After retiring as a player, he turned to coaching and broadcasting, presenting football programmes on television for 28 years until 2002. Wilson also founded the Willow Foundation charity in memory of his daughter.

== Early life ==
Wilson was born on Ashgate Road, in Chesterfield, where his father William was the Borough Engineer and Surveyor, and his mother Catherine Wilson (née Primrose) was a magistrate. Their Ashgate Road house was named "Threepwood" after the Galston, East Ayrshire farm where William Wilson was born. His middle name, Primrose, stems from a Scottish tradition of giving children their mother's maiden name as a middle name.

He was the youngest child of six and had much older brothers and an elder sister. Two of his brothers were killed in the Second World War, one as a Spitfire pilot and the other as a rear-gunner in a Lancaster.

After leaving Chesterfield Grammar School, he spent time with Loughborough College.

== Club career ==
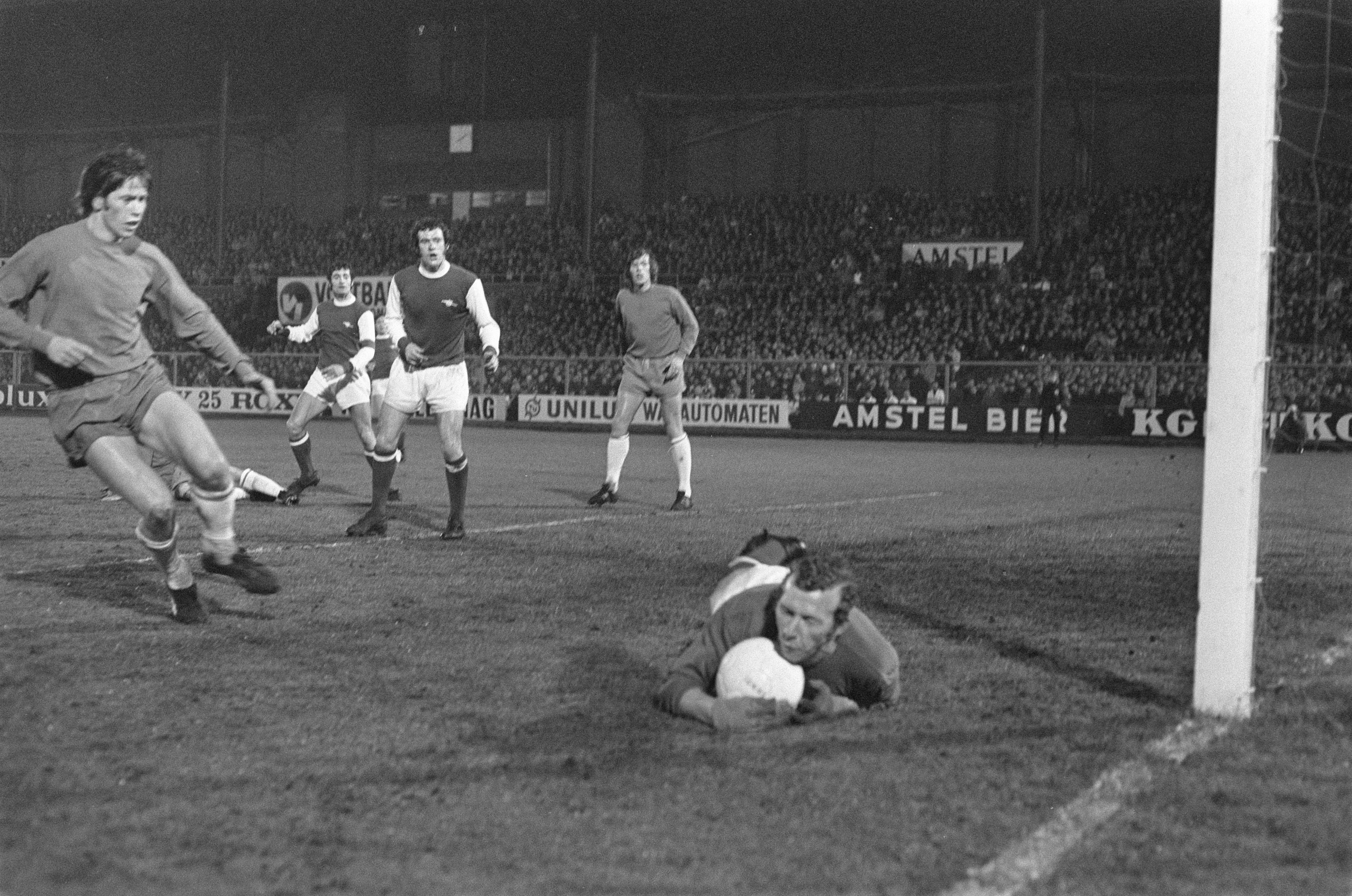
Wilson playing against Ajax Amsterdam (April 1970)

Wilson started late as a professional player, as his father would not let him sign papers with Manchester United as he thought it was not a reasonable job whilst he was a youth. Wilson then went on to Loughborough College for training as a teacher. He had been playing reserve games for Wolverhampton Wanderers as an amateur between 1961 and 1963 and was the first amateur to have a transfer fee paid (£7,500). He remained an amateur for eight months when he signed for Arsenal in July 1963 until he signed professional forms in March 1964.

Wilson made his debut against Nottingham Forest on 26 October 1963 in a 4–2 win. However, being forced to play understudy to Jim Furnell, it was to be over four years until Wilson became first-choice keeper in 1968, after Furnell made a mistake in an FA Cup tie against Birmingham City in March 1968. Wilson took over and remained in goal for Arsenal for the remainder of the 1967–68 season.

Later, firmly ensconced in the Arsenal side, Wilson was ever-present in the 1968–69 season, which included Arsenal's loss to Swindon Town in the 1969 League Cup Final. Despite sustaining a broken arm the following season, 1969–70, Wilson recovered and won his first trophy with Arsenal, the 1969–70 Inter-Cities Fairs Cup. In 1971, he was Arsenal's player of the year in their Double-winning season, in which he played every first-team match in League and Cup, culminating in the 1971 FA Cup Final win over Liverpool. Wilson was the first goalkeeper to get a number on his back and his favourite football shirt is his Arsenal shirt from the 1970/71 season with the number 1 on it.

Wilson continued to play as Arsenal's keeper through the early 1970s, although an injury late on in the 1972 FA Cup semi-final against Stoke City meant he missed Arsenal's 1972 FA Cup Final loss to Leeds United and much of the 1972–73 season. Understudy Geoff Barnett took his place, but Wilson regained the number one shirt once fully recovered, and was Arsenal's first-choice goalkeeper up until his surprisingly early retirement from playing in May 1974, at the age of 32.

In 1978 Wilson was signed by the Danish side Næstved IF, then managed by Jim Magill. Wilson played only seven matches, but helped the club to avoid relegation from the first division.

As a student and teacher of goalkeeping, Wilson has identified his own signature technique as diving at his opponents' feet to save goals. This caused him a number of injuries throughout his career.

== International career ==
He became eligible to play for Scotland when the rules were changed in 1970 to allow players to play for their parents' countries of origin, if they had not already played for their own country. Wilson was selected by Scotland manager Tommy Docherty for his first match in charge, against Portugal on 13 October 1971. Wilson was also selected for the match against the Netherlands on 1 December 1971, but Bobby Clark of Aberdeen was preferred after this.

== Coaching career ==
After retiring, Wilson was goalkeeping coach for Arsenal for 28 years, during which Pat Jennings, John Lukic, and David Seaman were goalkeepers. He retired at the end of the 2002–03 season, having helped Arsenal win two more doubles in 1997–98 and 2001–02, as only one of two people to have been involved with all three, with the other being Pat Rice.

== Broadcasting career ==
=== BBC ===
Wilson had already appeared as a pundit for the BBC during the 1970 World Cup. He became a television presenter after retiring from football, working for the BBC from 1974 to 1994 as host of Football Focus. During the late 1980s and early 1990s, he also presented Grandstand on a fairly regular basis (he was the presenter on Grandstand during the afternoon of the Hillsborough Disaster in 1989), and also occasionally presented Sportsnight. During the 1980s, he co-presented Match of the Day alongside Jimmy Hill, and also worked extensively on the BBC's World Cup coverage into the 1990s. During Des Lynam's time as the main BBC anchorman, Wilson often covered much of the World Cup while Lynam was concentrating on the Wimbledon Tennis Championships. Wilson also read the sports bulletins on Breakfast News during the late 1980s and early-mid 1990s, and was one of the hosts of the BBC Olympics coverage from Seoul in 1988.

He returned to Football in Focus to close its final episode on 24 May 2026. He said: "All good things come to an end. Thank you to all of you at home for watching Football Focus for the last 52 years. We have had a ball."

=== ITV ===
In late 1994, he moved to ITV, where he presented the station's UEFA Champions League, League Cup and FA Cup coverage. In addition, he presented Carlton Television's midweek highlights programme Carlton Sport. He also fronted ITV's coverage of Euro 96 and the 1998 World Cup, including England's loss to Argentina on penalties in the last 16 stage, which was watched by more than 23 million viewers. Following the arrival of Des Lynam at ITV in 1999, Wilson's role was diminished and he was mostly seen presenting late night highlights programmes on ITV. He also hosted coverage of matches being shown on On Digital's sports channels and he remained with them as it evolved into the ill-fated ITV Sport Channel, presenting the service's coverage of the pay-per-view Premier League matches. By the early 2000s, Gabby Logan had assumed some of Wilson's work, especially on the main ITV channel, and Wilson had a much smaller role with the station at the 2002 World Cup, which was to be his last work for ITV.

He still makes occasional appearances on television, on the BBC's Football Focus and Match of the Day 2, as well as occasional work on documentary programmes for Sky Sports. Half Man Half Biscuit made reference to Wilson as a broadcaster in the song "Bob Wilson – Anchorman".

He was the subject of This Is Your Life in 1998, when he was surprised by Michael Aspel during a training session with Arsenal at their training ground near St Albans.

=== Roy of the Rovers ===
In the mid-1980s he featured in a comic strip when he spent a season playing for the fictional Melchester Rovers team in Roy of the Rovers, in a team containing another former professional player turned TV presenter, Emlyn Hughes, and Spandau Ballet members Martin Kemp and Steve Norman. The quartet helped lead Rovers to League Cup glory and a record-breaking successive number of clean sheets – a somewhat unrealistic achievement considering Wilson's age and the fact he had not played for more than 10 years.

== Personal life ==
Wilson married Margaret "Megs" Miles on 25 July 1964 at Holy Trinity Church, Chesterfield, and they had three children: John (born 1965), Anna (1966–1998) and Robert (born 1968). John Wilson is a presenter on Front Row, the BBC Radio 4 arts programme. Megs Wilson died in November 2023.

It was announced in April 2014 that Wilson was fighting prostate cancer.

Wilson's great niece is Gina Coladangelo, a British businesswoman and lobbyist who made headlines in 2021 after exposure of her extramarital affair with Health Secretary Matt Hancock.

=== Charity work ===
In February 1994, his daughter Anna was diagnosed with malignant schwannoma, a cancer of the nerve sheath. She died on 1 December 1998, six days before her 32nd birthday. The "Willow Foundation" was set up in her memory in 1999 and operated locally, mainly in Hertfordshire. Wilson relaunched the charity on 4 October 2005 with a national remit. The organisation was established in Anna's memory and now helps some of the estimated 12,500 people in the UK, aged 16–40, who are diagnosed every year with the illness.

In 2007, Wilson was appointed an Officer of the Order of the British Empire (OBE) for his charity work.

=== Honorary award ===
In 1989, Wilson received an honorary award of Doctor of Letters from Loughborough University.

== Career statistics ==
=== Club ===
Appearances and goals by club, season and competition
| Club | Season | League | | FA Cup | | League Cup | | Europe (Note: Appearances in Fairs Cup and European Cup) | | Total | |
| Club | Season | Apps | Goals | Apps | Goals | Apps | Goals | Apps | Goals | Apps | Goals |
|---|---|---|---|---|---|---|---|---|---|---|---|
Arsenal
| Arsenal | 1963–64 | 5 | 0 | 0 | 0 | 0 | 0 | 1 | 0 | 6 | 0 |
| Arsenal | 1964–65 | 0 | 0 | 0 | 0 | 0 | 0 | 0 | 0 | 0 | 0 |
| Arsenal | 1965–66 | 4 | 0 | 0 | 0 | 0 | 0 | 0 | 0 | 4 | 0 |
| Arsenal | 1966–67 | 0 | 0 | 0 | 0 | 0 | 0 | 0 | 0 | 0 | 0 |
| Arsenal | 1967–68 | 13 | 0 | 1 | 0 | 0 | 0 | 0 | 0 | 14 | 0 |
| Arsenal | 1968–69 | 42 | 0 | 4 | 0 | 7 | 0 | 0 | 0 | 53 | 0 |
| Arsenal | 1969–70 | 28 | 0 | 2 | 0 | 2 | 0 | 9 | 0 | 41 | 0 |
| Arsenal | 1970–71 | 42 | 0 | 9 | 0 | 5 | 0 | 8 | 0 | 64 | 0 |
| Arsenal | 1971–72 | 37 | 0 | 7 | 0 | 3 | 0 | 6 | 0 | 53 | 0 |
| Arsenal | 1972–73 | 22 | 0 | 6 | 0 | 0 | 0 | 0 | 0 | 28 | 0 |
| Arsenal | 1973–74 | 41 | 0 | 3 | 0 | 1 | 0 | 0 | 0 | 45 | 0 |
| Career total | | 234 | 0 | 32 | 0 | 18 | 0 | 24 | 0 | 308 | 0 |

== Honours ==
Arsenal

- Football League First Division: 1970–71
- FA Cup: 1970–71
- Inter-Cities Fairs Cup: 1969–70
- Football League Cup runner-up: 1968–69

Individual

- Arsenal Player of the Season: 1970–71

== See also ==
- List of Scotland international footballers born outside Scotland
