= 1968–69 Football League Cup =

Tournament details
- Country: England; Wales
- Teams: 91

Final positions
- Champions: Swindon Town
- Runners-up: Arsenal

Tournament statistics
- Top goal scorer: Jimmy Greaves (5 goals)

The 1968–69 Football League Cup was the ninth season of the Football League Cup, a knockout competition for England's top 92 football clubs. The competition ended with the final on 15 March 1969.

The final was contested by Third Division team Swindon Town and First Division side Arsenal at Wembley Stadium in London. Roger Smart gave Swindon a surprise lead in the first half but Bobby Gould equalised for Arsenal in the 85th minute. In extra-time, Don Rogers scored twice for Swindon, leading them to a 3–1 victory.

== Calendar ==
Of the 91 teams, 37 received a bye to the second round (teams ranked 1st–38th in the 1967–68 Football League, excluding Manchester United who did not compete) and the other 54 played in the first round. Semi-finals were two-legged.

Round	Main date	Fixtures		Clubs	New entries this round
Round	Main date	Original	Replays	Clubs	New entries this round
First Round	14 August 1968	27	12	91 → 64	54 (teams ranked 17th–22nd in Second Division; all Third and Fourth Division)
Second Round	4 September 1968	32	8	64 → 32	37 (all First Division, except 1 team that did not enter; teams ranked 1st–16th in Second Division)
Third Round	25 September 1968	16	2	32 → 16	none
Fourth Round	16 October 1968	8	2	16 → 8	none
Fifth Round	30 October 1968	4	1	8 → 4	none
Semi-finals	20 November & 4 December 1968	4	1	4 → 2	none
Final	15 March 1969	1	0	2 → 1	none

== First round ==
=== Ties ===
Home team	Score	Away team	Date
Aldershot	2–4	Brentford	14 August 1968
Bournemouth & Boscombe Athletic	1–6	Southend United	13 August 1968
Bradford City	3–2	Hartlepool	14 August 1968
Bradford Park Avenue	0–3	Darlington	13 August 1968
Brighton & Hove Albion	2–0	Oxford United	14 August 1968
Bristol City	2–0	Newport County	13 August 1968
Bristol Rovers	0–2	Swansea Town	13 August 1968
Bury	1–1	Stockport County	13 August 1968
Chester	0–0	Tranmere Rovers	13 August 1968
Colchester United	2–0	Reading	13 August 1968
Crewe Alexandra	1–1	Northampton Town	14 August 1968
Derby County	3–0	Chesterfield	13 August 1968
Doncaster Rovers	0–0	Peterborough United	14 August 1968
Gillingham	2–2	Orient	14 August 1968
Grimsby Town	0–0	Notts County	14 August 1968
Halifax Town	0–3	Hull City	14 August 1968
Lincoln City	2–1	Mansfield Town	14 August 1968
Luton Town	3–0	Watford	14 August 1968
Plymouth Argyle	0–0	Exeter City	14 August 1968
Preston North End	1–1	Oldham Athletic	14 August 1968
Scunthorpe United	2–1	Rotherham United	13 August 1968
Southport	2–2	Barrow	14 August 1968
Swindon Town	2–1	Torquay United	13 August 1968
Walsall	2–0	Shrewsbury Town	13 August 1968
Workington	2–1	Rochdale	14 August 1968
Wrexham	2–0	Port Vale	14 August 1968
York City	3–4	Barnsley	14 August 1968

=== Replays ===
Home team	Score	Away team	Date
Barrow	1–3	Southport	19 August 1968
Crewe Alexandra	1–0	Northampton Town	21 August 1968
Exeter City	0–0	Plymouth Argyle	21 August 1968
Orient	3–0	Gillingham	20 August 1968
Notts County	0–1	Grimsby Town	21 August 1968
Oldham Athletic	0–1	Preston North End	21 August 1968
Peterborough United	1–0	Doncaster Rovers	19 August 1968
Stockport County	1–0	Bury	19 August 1968
Tranmere Rovers	2–2	Chester	21 August 1968

=== Second Replays ===
Home team	Score	Away team	Date
Plymouth Argyle	0–1	Exeter City	26 August 1968
Tranmere Rovers	1–1	Chester	26 August 1968

=== Third replay ===
Home team	Score	Away team	Date
Chester	1–2	Tranmere Rovers	28 August 1968

== Second round ==
=== Ties ===
Home team	Score	Away team	Date
Arsenal	1–0	Sunderland	4 September 1968
Aston Villa	1–4	Tottenham Hotspur	4 September 1968
Barnsley	1–1	Millwall	3 September 1968
Birmingham City	0–1	Chelsea	3 September 1968
Blackburn Rovers	1–1	Stoke City	4 September 1968
Bradford City	1–1	Swindon Town	4 September 1968
Brentford	3–0	Hull City	4 September 1968
Brighton & Hove Albion	1–1	Luton Town	4 September 1968
Bristol City	1–0	Middlesbrough	4 September 1968
Carlisle United	2–0	Cardiff City	4 September 1968
Colchester United	0–1	Workington	4 September 1968
Coventry City	2–0	Portsmouth	3 September 1968
Crystal Palace	3–1	Preston North End	4 September 1968
Darlington	1–2	Leicester City	4 September 1968
Derby County	5–1	Stockport County	4 September 1968
Everton	4–0	Tranmere Rovers	3 September 1968
Exeter City	3–1	Sheffield Wednesday	4 September 1968
Grimsby Town	1–1	Burnley	4 September 1968
Huddersfield Town	0–0	Manchester City	3 September 1968
Ipswich Town	2–4	Norwich City	3 September 1968
Leeds United	1–0	Charlton Athletic	4 September 1968
Orient	1–0	Fulham	3 September 1968
Liverpool	4–0	Sheffield United	4 September 1968
Nottingham Forest	2–3	West Bromwich Albion	3 September 1968
Peterborough United	4–2	Queens Park Rangers	4 September 1968
Scunthorpe United	2–1	Lincoln City	3 September 1968
Southampton	3–1	Crewe Alexandra	4 September 1968
Southport	0–2	Newcastle United	2 September 1968
Walsall	1–1	Swansea Town	3 September 1968
West Ham United	7–2	Bolton Wanderers	4 September 1968
Wolverhampton Wanderers	1–0	Southend United	4 September 1968
Wrexham	1–1	Blackpool	4 September 1968

=== Replays ===
Home team	Score	Away team	Date
Blackpool	3–0	Wrexham	9 September 1968
Burnley	6–0	Grimsby Town	10 September 1968
Luton Town	4–2	Brighton & Hove Albion	11 September 1968
Manchester City	4–0	Huddersfield Town	11 September 1968
Millwall	3–1	Barnsley	9 September 1968
Stoke City	0–1	Blackburn Rovers	11 September 1968
Swansea Town	3–2	Walsall	10 September 1968
Swindon Town	4–3	Bradford City	10 September 1968

== Third round ==
=== Ties ===
Home team	Score	Away team	Date
Brentford	0–2	Norwich City	24 September 1968
Blackpool	1–0	Manchester City	25 September 1968
Carlisle United	0–3	Leicester City	24 September 1968
Chelsea	0–0	Derby County	25 September 1968
Everton	5–1	Luton Town	24 September 1968
Leeds United	2–1	Bristol City	25 September 1968
Orient	0–1	Crystal Palace	24 September 1968
Liverpool	2–0	Swansea Town	25 September 1968
Peterborough United	2–1	West Bromwich Albion	25 September 1968
Scunthorpe United	1–6	Arsenal	25 September 1968
Southampton	4–1	Newcastle United	25 September 1968
Swindon Town	1–0	Blackburn Rovers	24 September 1968
Tottenham Hotspur	6–3	Exeter City	25 September 1968
West Ham United	0–0	Coventry City	25 September 1968
Wolverhampton Wanderers	5–1	Millwall	25 September 1968
Workington	0–1	Burnley	25 September 1968

=== Replays ===
Home team	Score	Away team	Date
Coventry City	3–2	West Ham United	1 October 1968
Derby County	3–1	Chelsea	2 October 1968

== Fourth round ==
=== Ties ===
Home team	Score	Away team	Date
Arsenal	2–1	Liverpool	15 October 1968
Blackpool	2–1	Wolverhampton Wanderers	16 October 1968
Burnley	4–0	Leicester City	16 October 1968
Coventry City	2–2	Swindon Town	16 October 1968
Crystal Palace	2–1	Leeds United	16 October 1968
Everton	0–0	Derby County	16 October 1968
Norwich City	0–4	Southampton	16 October 1968
Tottenham Hotspur	1–0	Peterborough United	16 October 1968

=== Replays ===
Home team	Score	Away team	Date
Derby County	1–0	Everton	23 October 1968
Swindon Town	3–0	Coventry City	21 October 1968

== Fifth round ==
=== Ties ===
Home team	Score	Away team	Date
Arsenal	5–1	Blackpool	29 October 1968
Burnley	2–0	Crystal Palace	30 October 1968
Derby County	0–0	Swindon Town	30 October 1968
Tottenham Hotspur	1–0	Southampton	30 October 1968

=== Replay ===
Home team	Score	Away team	Date
Swindon Town	1–0	Derby County	5 November 1968

== Semi-finals ==
=== First leg ===
Home team	Score	Away team	Date
Arsenal	1–0	Tottenham Hotspur	20 November 1968
Burnley	1–2	Swindon Town	20 November 1968

=== Second leg ===
Home team	Score	Away team	Date	Agg
Swindon Town	1–2	Burnley	4 December 1968	3–3
Tottenham Hotspur	1–1	Arsenal	4 December 1968	1–2

=== Replay ===
Home team	Score	Away team	Date
Burnley	2–3	Swindon Town	18 December 1968

== Final ==
The final was held at Wembley Stadium, London on 15 March 1969.

15 March 1969
15:30 BST

Swindon Town	3–1	Arsenal
Smart 35'; Rogers 104', 119'	Summary	Gould 85'

Wembley Stadium, London
Attendance: 98,189

Arsenal; Yellow shirts/Blue shorts/Yellow socks	1 — 3 (after extra time)	Swindon Town; White shirts/White shorts/White socks
Manager: Bertie Mee Team: Wilson (GK); Storey; McNab; McLintock; Ure; Simpson off 71'; Radford; Sammels; Court; Gould; Armstrong Substitutes: Graham on 71' Scorers: Bobby Gould 86'	Half-time: 0–1 Competition: Football League Cup (Final) Date: 15:00 BST Saturday 15 March 1969 Venue: Wembley Stadium, London Attendance: 98,189 Match rules: 90 minutes. 30 minutes extra-time if necessary. Match replayed if scores still level. One named substitute.	Manager: Danny Williams Team: Downsborough (GK); Thomas; Trollope; Butler; Burrows; Harland; Heath; Smart; Smith off 77'; Noble; Rogers Substitutes: Penman on 77' Scorers: Roger Smart 35'; Don Rogers 104', 119'
