= Joe Butler (footballer, born 1943) =

English footballer

Personal information
- Date of birth: 7 February 1943 (age 83)
- Place of birth: Newcastle upon Tyne, England
- Position: Right back

Youth career
- 1960–1962: Newcastle United

Senior career*
Years	Team	Apps	(Gls)
1962–1965	Newcastle United	3	(0)
1965–1976	Swindon Town	362	(18)
- Aldershot
- Witney Town
- * Club domestic league appearances and goals

Joseph Butler (born 7 February 1943) is a retired football right back best known for his spell at Swindon Town.

== Career ==
=== Newcastle United ===
Joe Butler started his football career as a junior with his hometime club Newcastle United. He made his senior debut in the 1963 Football League Cup loss at Bournemouth & Boscombe. Later, during the same season, Joe Butler played his only three league games for the Magpies. His league debut came in the 2–1 loss at Manchester City and then appearing at St James' Park in a 5–2 victory over Rotherham United before making his final appearance in the 4–0 loss to Bury.

=== Swindon Town ===
In 1965, Swindon Town paid Newcastle United £5,500 to secure the services of Joe Butler. The fee would see Butler remain in Wiltshire for eleven seasons. During his spell at Swindon he famously helped his club win the Football League Cup in 1969 against Arsenal and Anglo-Italian Cup victories over AS Roma and SSC Napoli.

== Honours ==
Swindon Town

- Football League Third Division runner-up: 1968–69
- Football League Cup: 1968–69
- Anglo-Italian Cup: 1969
- Anglo-Italian Cup: 1970
