= Danny Williams (footballer, born 1924) =

English footballer and manager (1924–2019)

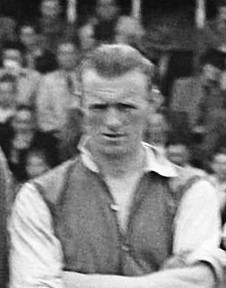
- Danny Williams in 1948

Personal information
- Full name: Daniel Williams
- Date of birth: 20 November 1924
- Place of birth: Thrybergh, England
- Date of death: 3 February 2019 (aged 94)
- Place of death: Newmarket, England
- Position: Inside forward

Youth career
- Silverwood Colliery

Senior career*
Years	Team	Apps	(Gls)
1943–1965	Rotherham United	461	(21)

Managerial career
- 1962–1965: Rotherham United
- 1965–1969: Swindon Town
- 1969–1971: Sheffield Wednesday
- 1971–1974: Mansfield Town
- 1974–1978: Swindon Town
- * Club domestic league appearances and goals

Daniel Williams (20 November 1924 – 3 February 2019) was an English football player and manager.

== Playing career ==
Born in Thrybergh, Williams began his career with Silverwood Colliery and he spent his entire professional playing career with Rotherham United as either a left-half or inside-forward between 1943 and 1965. He made 461 league appearances, scoring 21 goals.

== Management career ==
He managed Rotherham United (1962–1965), Swindon Town (1965–1969) and (1974–1978), Sheffield Wednesday (1969–1971) and Mansfield Town (1971–1974).

He led Swindon to victory in the 1969 Football League Cup final, the 1969 Anglo-Italian League Cup and the 1970 Anglo-Italian Cup.

After leaving his role as Swindon manager in 1978, he then worked as general manager until 1985.

== Death ==
He died on 3 February 2019, aged 94.

== Honours ==
Swindon Town

- Football League Cup: 1968–69
