= Rod Thomas =

Welsh footballer (1947–2025)

Personal information
- Full name: Roderick John Thomas
- Date of birth: 11 January 1947
- Place of birth: Glynncorwg, Neath, Wales
- Date of death: 15 November 2025 (aged 78)
- Height: 6 ft 2 in (1.88 m)
- Position: Defender

Youth career
- Gloucester City

Senior career*
Years	Team	Apps	(Gls)
1963–1964	Gloucester City	10	(3)
1964–1973	Swindon Town	296	(5)
1973–1977	Derby County	89	(2)
1977–1981	Cardiff City	96	(0)
1981–1982	Gloucester City		
1982	Newport County	3	(0)
1982	Bath City	2	(0)
1982–1983	Barry Town		

International career
1967–1977	Wales	50	(0)
- * Club domestic league appearances and goals

Roderick John Thomas (11 January 1947 – 15 November 2025) was a Welsh professional footballer who played as a defender for Gloucester City, Swindon Town, Derby County, Cardiff City, Gloucester for a second spell and Newport County. He represented the Wales national team at international level, making 50 appearances.

== Career ==
Swindon Town manager Bert Head brought Thomas to the County Ground from non-league Gloucester City in July 1964 – paying £500 for his services. Still a youth player, it was almost two years before he made his debut, in a drab 0–0 draw with Scunthorpe, at the end of the 1965–66 season.

The following season saw Thomas establish himself as the club's first choice right back, and he also achieved his first international honours, being selected for the Welsh under-23 squad. Widely recognised as one of the best defenders outside of the First Division, Thomas made his full international debut in a 0–0 draw with Northern Ireland in 1967 – he remains the club's most capped international footballer.

Despite interest from bigger clubs, Thomas went on to make nearly 300 appearances for Swindon, including the 1969 League Cup final. By the time he left in 1973, he had made the most international appearances ever by a Swindon player, having played in thirty matches for Wales. He moved on to Derby County, when former Town manager Dave Mackay offered £100,000 for Thomas' signature. At Derby he was part of the team that won the 1974–75 First Division.

Thomas left Derby in 1977, joining Cardiff City for £10,000, making his debut in a 2–0 win over Stoke City. His four years at Cardiff were hampered by injuries and, in 1981, he returned to Gloucester City.

He made another twenty appearances for his country, and had brief spells at Newport County, Bath City and Barry Town, before his retirement in 1982.

== Death ==
Thomas died on 15 November 2025, at the age of 78.

== Career statistics ==
Appearances and goals by club, season and competition
Club	Season	League		Cup		Total	
Club	Season	Apps	Goals	Apps	Goals	Apps	Goals
Swindon Town	1965–66	2	0	0	0	2	0
Swindon Town	1966–67	35	0	10	0	45	0
Swindon Town	1967–68	41	0	5	0	46	0
Swindon Town	1968–69	44	0	15	0	59	0
Swindon Town	1969–70	41	1	13	0	54	1
Swindon Town	1970–71	42	1	9	0	51	1
Swindon Town	1971–72	36	1	2	0	38	1
Swindon Town	1972–73	41	2	3	0	44	2
Swindon Town	1973–74	14	0	2	0	16	0
Swindon Town	Total	296	5	59	0	355	5

== Honours ==
Swindon Town

- Football League Cup: 1968–69
- Anglo-Italian League Cup: 1969
- Anglo-Italian Cup: 1970

Derby County

- Football League First Division: 1974–75
- FA Charity Shield: 1975

== Sources ==
- Hayes, Dean (2006). The Who's Who of Cardiff City. Breedon Books. ISBN 1-85983-462-0.
