= Don Rogers (footballer) =

English footballer (born 1945)

Personal information
- Full name: Donald Edward Rogers
- Date of birth: 25 October 1945 (age 81)
- Place of birth: Paulton, England
- Position: Left winger

Senior career*
Years	Team	Apps	(Gls)
1962–1972	Swindon Town	400	(147)
1972–1974	Crystal Palace	70	(28)
1974–1976	Queens Park Rangers	18	(5)
1976–1977	Swindon Town	12	(2)
1976–1977	→ Yeovil Town (loan)		
Total		500	(182)

Managerial career
- Lambourn Sports
- 1996–1998: Swindon Supermarine
- 1998–1999: Hungerford Town
- * Club domestic league appearances and goals

Donald Edward Rogers (born 25 October 1945) is an English former footballer who is best known for his time with Swindon Town. He played as an outside left and served the club in two spells. Rogers scored two extra-time goals in Swindon's victory over Arsenal in the 1969 League Cup Final.

== Playing career ==
Born in Paulton, Somerset, Rogers signed a youth contract with Swindon in January 1961 at the age of fifteen; having turned professional in October 1962, he made his first-team debut on 17 November in a Third Division match against Southend United. Rogers scored the two extra-time goals which won the 1969 Football League Cup Final for Swindon, 3–1 against Arsenal.

He signed for Crystal Palace in 1972 for a fee of £147,000. Highlights included scoring two goals in a 5–0 victory over Manchester United at Selhurst Park in 1972 and scoring the goal of the season in 1973, selected from London-based players. He then joined Queens Park Rangers in September 1974 in an exchange deal involving Terry Venables and Ian Evans. Rogers played 18 league games for QPR, scoring five goals, before returning to Swindon in March 1976 in exchange for Peter Eastoe.

In November 1976 Rogers moved on loan to the Southern League team Yeovil Town, where he joined his old Swindon teammate Stan Harland. He returned to Swindon two months later and, after suffering a hip injury, retired at the end of the 1976–77 season and now runs a sports shop in Swindon bearing his name.

== Managerial career ==
In the 1990 Rogers was manager of Lambourn Sports, who were at the time in the Hellenic Football League. During his tenure as manager, he helped secured the club's promotion to the Premier Division for the first time in 12 years, and reached the final of the Berks and Bucks Senior Trophy winning it once in the 1994–95 season, completing a league and cup double.

He then went on to become joint manager of Swindon Supermarine with John Fisher in July 1996 and won the Hellenic Football League Premier Division title in the 1997–98 season. He and Fisher left at the start of the 1998–99 campaign due to the club's lack of ambition.

Rogers was subsequently appointed manager of Hungerford Town but, despite guiding them to the 3rd qualifying round of the FA Cup, left at the start of the 1999–2000 season.

== Personal life ==
Prior to retiring, he went into the retail business, owning a shop in Swindon called Don Rogers Sports.

== The Don Rogers Stand ==
On 22 March 2008 Swindon Town announced that the South Stand would be renamed The Don Rogers Stand from the start of the 2008–09 season.

=== Club Ambassador ===
On 27 July 2021, Rogers was appointed Swindon Town Club Ambassador by the new club chairman Clem Morfuni. He also sits on the newly appointed advisory board as well as representing the club within the community of Swindon and the wider region at events, working on community outreach.

== Honours ==
Swindon Town

- Football League Cup: 1968–69
- Anglo-Italian League Cup: 1969
- Anglo-Italian Cup: 1970
