= 1968–69 Coppa Italia =

Tournament details
- Country: Italy
- Dates: 8 Sept 1968 – 29 June 1969
- Teams: 36

Final positions
- Champions: Roma (2nd title)

Tournament statistics
- Matches played: 74
- Goals scored: 170 (2.3 per match)
- Top goal scorer: Gigi Riva (8 goals)

The 1968–69 Coppa Italia, the 22nd Coppa Italia was an Italian Football Federation domestic cup competition won by Roma.

== Group stage ==
=== Group 1 ===
Pos	Team	Pld	W	D	L	GF	GA	GD	Pts
1	Milan	3	2	1	0	5	0	+5	5
2	Vicenza	3	2	1	0	6	2	+4	5
3	Monza	3	1	0	2	1	6	−5	2
4	Ternana	3	0	0	3	2	6	−4	0

=== Group 2 ===
Pos	Team	Pld	W	D	L	GF	GA	GD	Pts
1	Napoli	3	2	0	1	6	3	+3	4
2	Palermo	3	1	1	1	3	3	0	3
3	Catanzaro	3	1	1	1	2	2	0	3
4	Catania	3	0	2	1	3	6	−3	2

=== Group 3 ===
Pos	Team	Pld	W	D	L	GF	GA	GD	Pts
1	Juventus	3	2	1	0	8	1	+7	5
2	Cesena	3	1	1	1	1	1	0	3
3	Genoa	3	1	0	2	3	5	−2	2
4	Sampdoria	3	1	0	2	2	7	−5	2

=== Group 4 ===
Pos	Team	Pld	W	D	L	GF	GA	GD	Pts
1	Foggia	3	2	1	0	6	1	+5	5
2	Fiorentina	3	2	1	0	7	3	+4	5
3	Bari	3	0	1	2	4	8	−4	1
4	Pisa	3	0	1	2	0	5	−5	1

=== Group 5 ===
Pos	Team	Pld	W	D	L	GF	GA	GD	Pts
1	Atalanta	3	1	2	0	3	2	+1	4
2	Como	3	1	1	1	4	3	+1	3
3	Internazionale	3	0	3	0	3	3	0	3
4	Lecco	3	0	2	1	1	3	−2	2

=== Group 6 ===
Pos	Team	Pld	W	D	L	GF	GA	GD	Pts
1	Roma	3	2	1	0	4	0	+4	5
2	SPAL	3	0	3	0	1	1	0	3
3	Lazio	3	0	2	1	2	3	−1	2
4	Bologna	3	0	2	1	1	4	−3	2

=== Group 7 ===
Pos	Team	Pld	W	D	L	GF	GA	GD	Pts
1	Torino	3	3	0	0	9	3	+6	6
2	Hellas Verona	3	2	0	1	7	3	+4	4
3	Reggiana	3	1	0	2	1	5	−4	2
4	Modena	3	0	0	3	3	9	−6	0

=== Group 8 ===
Pos	Team	Pld	W	D	L	GF	GA	GD	Pts
1	Brescia	3	2	0	1	7	5	+2	4
2	Padova	3	1	1	1	2	2	0	3
3	Varese	3	1	1	1	2	3	−1	3
4	Mantova	3	1	0	2	4	5	−1	2

=== Group 9 ===
Pos	Team	Pld	W	D	L	GF	GA	GD	Pts
1	Cagliari	3	2	1	0	4	1	+3	5
2	Reggina	3	2	1	0	3	1	+2	5
3	Perugia	3	0	1	2	1	3	−2	1
4	Livorno	3	0	1	2	1	4	−3	1

== Quarter-finals ==
The top eight groupwinners of the group stage qualifier in the quarter-finals. Fell out the Atalanta.

Team 1	Agg.	Team 2	1st leg	2nd leg
Torino	2–0	Milan	1–0	1–0
Brescia	1–3	Roma	1–0	0–3
Foggia	4–1	Napoli	2–1	2–0
Cagliari	2–1	Juventus	1–0	1–1

== Final group ==
Pos	Team	Pld	W	D	L	GF	GA	GD	Pts
1	Roma	6	3	3	0	11	5	+6	9
2	Cagliari	6	2	2	2	9	8	+1	6
3	Foggia	6	1	3	2	9	13	−4	5
4	Torino	6	0	4	2	7	10	−3	4

== Top goalscorers ==
Rank	Player	Club	Goals
1	(Italy) Gigi Riva	Cagliari	8
2	(Spain) Joaquín Peiró	Roma	6
3	(Italy) Nello Saltutti	Foggia	5
4	(Italy) Carlo Facchin	Torino	4
