= John Smith (footballer, born 1939) =

English footballer (1939–1988)

Personal information
- Date of birth: 4 January 1939
- Place of birth: Shoreditch, London, England
- Date of death: February 1988 (aged 49)
- Place of death: Brent, England
- Positions: Wing half; inside forward

Youth career
- –1956: West Ham United

Senior career*
Years	Team	Apps	(Gls)
1956–1960	West Ham United	127	(20)
1960–1964	Tottenham Hotspur	21	(1)
1964–1965	Coventry City	35	(1)
1965–1966	Leyton Orient	39	(3)
1966–1968	Torquay United	68	(8)
1968–1971	Swindon Town	84	(9)
1971–1972	Walsall	13	(1)
1973–1974	Dundalk	17	(1)
Total		404	(44)

Managerial career
- 1972–1973: Walsall
- 1973–1974: Dundalk
- * Club domestic league appearances and goals

John Smith (4 January 1939 – February 1988) was an English footballer.

Born in Shoreditch, London, Smith was a product of the Academy of West Ham United. He played for the east London club between 1956 and 1960, playing right half and inside right, and was a key figure in the team that won the Second Division in 1957–58. He made 136 appearances for the club, scoring 23 goals.

Smith transferred to Tottenham Hotspur, where he was one of 17 players to represent the club in their Double winning season of 1960–61. Smith played in the Swindon Town side which beat Arsenal in the 1969 Football League Cup Final.

At the time of his death he was the steward of McVitie's social club in Park Royal, north west London.

== Honours ==
Swindon Town

- Football League Cup: 1968–69
- Anglo-Italian League Cup: 1969
- Anglo-Italian Cup: 1970
