= Frank Burrows =

Scottish footballer and manager (1944–2021)

Personal information
- Date of birth: 30 January 1944
- Place of birth: Larkhall, Scotland
- Date of death: 24 November 2021 (aged 77)
- Position: Central defender

Youth career
- Sauchie Juveniles

Senior career*
Years	Team	Apps	(Gls)
1962–1965	Raith Rovers	76	(1)
1965–1968	Scunthorpe United	106	(4)
1968–1976	Swindon Town	297	(9)
1974	→ Mansfield Town (loan)	6	(0)
Total		485	(14)

Managerial career
- 1979–1982: Portsmouth
- 1986–1989: Cardiff City
- 1990–1991: Portsmouth
- 1991–1995: Swansea City
- 1998–2000: Cardiff City
- 2004: West Bromwich Albion (caretaker)
- 2007: Leicester City (caretaker)
- * Club domestic league appearances and goals

Frank Burrows (30 January 1944 – 24 November 2021) was a Scottish football player and manager who played as a central defender.

== Life and career ==
Frank Burrows began his football career at Scottish club Raith Rovers. In 1965, he moved south to England and joined Scunthorpe United. Impressive performances as a defender for Scunthorpe led to him being signed by Swindon Town F.C. for the 1968–69 season as a replacement for the departing Mel Nurse. Burrows was a major factor in helping Swindon to their most successful ever season in which they won promotion and the League Cup.

Burrows played alongside team captain Stan Harland in the middle of a defence that conceded just 35 goals in 46 League matches. He went on to make over 350 appearances for Swindon. At the start of the 1973–74 season he was made a player coach, such was the feeling that he was a natural leader as well as a solid defender.

The 1975–76 season saw his coaching come more into prominence. The season had not gone well for Swindon with a defeat at the hands of Tooting & Mitcham United in the FA Cup and a slide down the Football League Division Three table into a perilous position.

Ambitious as a manager, Burrows left Swindon to be appointed assistant manager to Jimmy Dickinson at Portsmouth. When Dickinson resigned in 1979 Burrows replaced him. Burrows enjoyed success at Portsmouth as a manager winning promotion from the fourth division in May 1980, after leaving the club in 1982 he spent time as assistant manager at Sunderland, before being appointed manager at Cardiff City in May 1986. Burrows arrived to a Cardiff side demoralised by two successive relegations under former manager Alan Durban that had left the club in the bottom rung of the Football League. Burrows brought in his own coaching staff, including former City manager Jimmy Goodfellow, Bobby Smith and Gavin Tait.

Burrows managed to lead City to promotion in the 1987–88 season, but the side struggled in the old Third Division and following disagreements with the board of directors, Burrows resigned in August 1989. Later that year, he returned to Portsmouth as assistant manager to John Gregory, before being appointed manager in January 1990. Portsmouth had been in serious danger of a second relegation in three campaigns, but a remarkable run of 21 points in their final nine games meant they finished nearer to a play off spot than the drop zone; unquestionably the determining factor in his appointment at Fratton Park being made more permanent. However, he left the following year after a string of poor performances. Burrows then arrived at Swansea City in March 1991, and enjoyed a productive four-year spell as manager of the Swans. Whilst at Swansea he led them to victory in the 1994 Football League Trophy Final. However, a falling-out with the board led to Burrows departure in July 1995, being succeeded in the position by his assistant, Bobby Smith.

He was then on the coaching staff at West Ham United, working under manager Harry Redknapp before returning to Cardiff City as manager in February 1998, succeeding Kenny Hibbitt in the manager's position. Under Burrows, Cardiff won promotion to the old Division Two in the 1998–99 season, but the team found themselves struggling to stay out of the relegation zone, and Burrows resigned in February 2000, being succeeded by his assistant, Billy Ayre.

From 2000 until 2004, Burrows was assistant manager to Gary Megson at West Bromwich Albion and helped them win promotion to the Premiership twice. In 2001 Burrows was diagnosed with cancer of the kidney, and spent several weeks away from The Hawthorns to recover from major surgery. In 2002, he signed a new three-year deal with the Baggies. Burrows took charge of two games as caretaker-manager following Megson's departure in November 2004, but left the Hawthorns once Bryan Robson arrived, despite being offered a role in the new setup. He was then given an opportunity to resurrect his partnership with Gary Megson, when he was offered the job of first team coach at Nottingham Forest, but he turned the post down, citing family reasons. He did join up with Megson again two years later though, taking up a role in the Leicester City coaching setup. The partnership was not to last long, however, as after just 41 days in the job Megson resigned, leaving Burrows as caretaker manager alongside Gerry Taggart. This continued until 22 November 2007, when Ian Holloway was appointed the new Leicester manager and Burrows left the club by mutual consent.

== Death ==
He died on 24 November 2021, at the age of 77.

== Honours ==
=== As a player ===
Swindon Town

- Football League Cup: 1968–69
- Anglo-Italian League Cup: 1969
- Anglo-Italian Cup: 1970

=== As a manager ===
Swansea City

- Football League Trophy: 1993–94
