= Anglo-Italian League Cup =

- Founded: 1969; 57 years ago
- Abolished: 1976; 50 years ago
- Region: England; Italy
- Last champions: (Italy) Napoli (1st title)
- Most championships: (England) Swindon Town (Italy) Bologna (England) Tottenham Hotspur (Italy) Fiorentina (Italy) Napoli (1 title each)

The Anglo-Italian League Cup (Italian: Coppa di Lega Italo-Inglese, also known as the Anglo-Italian League Cup Winners' Cup or International League Cup Winners' Cup) was a short-lived football competition between teams from England and Italy – an English cup-winning team (League Cup or FA Cup) and the Coppa Italia winner, playing each other over two legs. It was contested between 1969–71 and 1975–76.

The competition was set up at the same time as the Anglo-Italian Cup in 1969.

== History ==
The Football League Cup was changed in 1967 so the winner would be awarded a place in the Inter-Cities Fairs Cup. But the Inter-Cities Fairs Cup competition rules did not allow third-tier teams to compete at that time. When Queens Park Rangers won the 1967 League Cup final they were in the Third Division, as were Swindon Town when they won the 1969 League Cup.

The Anglo-Italian League Cup was organised as a way of compensating Swindon for the ruling that prevented them competing in the Inter-Cities Fairs Cup in 1969. A two-legged match was organised with that year's Coppa Italia champions A.S. Roma. The first-leg was held at the Stadio Olimpico, with Roma winning 2–1, but that deficit was overturned in the return leg at the County Ground, Swindon where Swindon won 4–0 making them champions with a 5–2 aggregate.

In 1970, Coppa Italia winners Bologna defeated League Cup winners Manchester City with a 3–2 win on aggregate. The 1971 competition was the last for a few years and League Cup winners Tottenham Hotspur defeated Coppa Italia winners Torino 3–0 on aggregate.

It was briefly reinstated in 1975 (winners Fiorentina), this time between the FA Cup and Coppa Italia winners, but only lasted two seasons before being finally scrapped in 1976 (winners Napoli).

== Winners ==
Key

**Bold**	Indicates the winner in two-legged finals

Year	Country	Home team	Score	Away team	Country	Venue	Location	Notes
1969	ITA	Roma	2–1	**Swindon Town**	ENG	Stadio Olimpico	Rome, Italy	
1969	ENG	**Swindon Town**	4–0	Roma	ITA	County Ground	Swindon, England	
1969	**Swindon Town** won 5–2 on aggregate							
1970	ITA	**Bologna**	1–0	Manchester City	ENG	Stadio Comunale	Bologna, Italy	
1970	ENG	Manchester City	2–2	**Bologna**	ITA	Maine Road	Manchester, England	
1970	**Bologna** won 3–2 on aggregate							
1971	ITA	Torino	0–1	**Tottenham Hotspur**	ENG	Stadio Comunale	Turin, Italy	
1971	ENG	**Tottenham Hotspur**	2–0	Torino	ITA	White Hart Lane	London, England	
1971	**Tottenham Hotspur** won 3–0 on aggregate							
1972	Not played							
1973	Not played							
1974	Not played							
1975	ITA	**Fiorentina**	1–0	West Ham United	ENG	Stadio Artemio Franchi	Florence, Italy	
1975	ENG	West Ham United	0–1	**Fiorentina**	ITA	Upton Park	London, England	
1975	**Fiorentina** won 2–0 on aggregate							
1976	ENG	Southampton	1–0	**Napoli**	ITA	The Dell	Southampton, England	
1976	ITA	**Napoli**	4–0	Southampton	ENG	Stadio Artemio Franchi	Florence, Italy	
1976	**Napoli** won 4–1 on aggregate							

== See also ==
- Anglo-Italian Cup
