= List of Swindon Town F.C. managers =

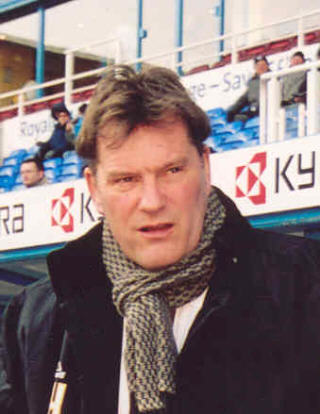
Glenn Hoddle led Swindon Town to the Premier League in 1993.

The current manager of Swindon Town Football Club is Ian Holloway. The club has had 37 permanent managers (of whom six also served as player-manager) while Iffy Onuora, Mark Cooper and Luke Williams have served as both interim manager and permanent manager.

Swindon Town's first ever manager was former Swindon Town committee member Sam Allen. Allen remains Swindon Town's longest-serving manager, holding the position for 31 years between 1902 and 1933, spanning 1,192 matches. Swindon Town's shortest reigning permanent manager is Martin Ling, who was in charge for nine games. Statistically, Swindon Town's least successful manager is Paul Hart, who won just one of his 11 matches in charge.

The first manager under whom Swindon Town won a major trophy was Danny Williams, who guided the club to the Football League Cup in the 1968–69 season. Fred Ford, Lou Macari, Osvaldo Ardiles, Glenn Hoddle, Steve McMahon and Paolo Di Canio have also won trophies with the club.

== List of managers ==
Updated 11 November 2025.

Name	From	To	P	W	D	L	GF	GA	GD	Win%	Notes
(England) Sam Allen	1902	1933	1,192	508	262	422	2,083	1,770	+313	42.6	
(Wales) Ted Vizard	1933	1939	285	108	63	114	455	481	−26	37.9	
(Scotland) Neil Harris	1939	1940	33	10	10	13	69	73	−4	30.3	
(England) Louis Page	1945	1953	369	135	95	139	515	570	−55	36.6	
(England) Maurice Lindley	1953	1955	93	26	25	42	114	134	−20	28.0	
(England) Bert Head	1956	1965	426	160	108	158	660	637	+23	37.6	
(England) Danny Williams	Jul 1965	Jul 1969	222	104	58	60	377	237	+140	46.8	
(England) Fred Ford	Jul 1969	Nov 1971	122	50	34	38	175	140	+35	41.0	
(Scotland) Dave Mackay	Nov 1971	Nov 1972	45	14	13	18	58	66	−8	31.1	
(England) Les Allen	Nov 1972	Feb 1974	62	13	20	29	61	94	−33	21.0	
(England) Danny Williams	Mar 1974	May 1978	227	87	61	79	340	328	+12	38.3	
(England) Bobby Smith	May 1978	Sep 1980	132	63	25	44	208	169	+39	47.7	
(England) John Trollope	Sep 1980	Apr 1983	121	43	33	45	161	153	+8	35.5	
(England) Ken Beamish	Apr 1983	Jun 1984	68	26	17	25	99	87	+12	38.2	
(Scotland) Lou Macari	Jul 1984	Jul 1989	285	138	67	80	449	340	+109	48.4	
(Argentina) Ossie Ardiles	Jul 1989	Mar 1991	106	40	33	33	163	140	+23	37.7	
(Republic of Ireland) Tony Galvin*	Mar 1991	Apr 1991	1	0	0	1	1	2	−1	0.0	
(England) Glenn Hoddle	Apr 1991	Jul 1993	120	51	32	37	202	162	+40	42.5	
(Scotland) John Gorman	Jul 1993	Nov 1994	72	15	20	37	90	148	−58	20.8	
(England) Andy Rowland*	Nov 1994	Nov 1994	3	1	1	1	4	4	+0	33.3	
(England) Steve McMahon	Dec 1994	Sep 1998	204	75	49	80	245	277	−32	36.8	
(Republic of Ireland) Mike Walsh*	Sep 1998	Oct 1998	2	0	1	1	1	2	−1	0.0	
(Northern Ireland) Jimmy Quinn	Oct 1998	May 2000	85	19	21	45	84	141	−57	22.4	
(England) Colin Todd	May 2000	Oct 2000	18	4	6	8	16	29	−13	22.2	
(England) Andy King	Oct 2000	Aug 2001	39	13	11	15	49	48	+1	33.3	
(England) Roy Evans	Aug 2001	Dec 2001	26	10	6	10	30	35	−5	38.5	
(England) Andy King	Dec 2001	Sep 2005	193	71	48	74	265	263	+2	36.8	
(Scotland) Iffy Onuora†	Sep 2005	May 2006	40	10	15	15	40	56	−16	25.0	
(England) Dennis Wise	May 2006	Oct 2006	17	9	5	3	24	14	+10	52.9	
(England) David Tuttle*	Oct 2006	Oct 2006	0	0	0	0	0	0	+0	—	
(Wales) Ady Williams*	Oct 2006	Nov 2006	2	0	0	2	1	3	−2	0.0	
(Scotland) Paul Sturrock	Nov 2006	Nov 2007	52	26	11	15	71	51	+20	50.0	
(England) David Byrne*	Nov 2007	Jan 2008	10	3	4	3	14	17	−3	30.0	
(Scotland) Maurice Malpas	Jan 2008	Nov 2008	42	13	11	18	59	61	−2	31.0	
(England) David Byrne*	Nov 2008	Dec 2008	8	1	4	3	12	14	−2	12.5	
(Northern Ireland) Danny Wilson	Dec 2008	Mar 2011	120	43	40	37	173	160	+13	35.8	
(England) Paul Hart	Mar 2011	Apr 2011	11	1	4	6	6	12	−6	9.1	
(Wales) Paul Bodin*	Apr 2011	May 2011	2	1	0	1	2	2	+0	50.0	
(Italy) Paolo Di Canio	May 2011	Feb 2013	95	54	18	23	155	76	+79	56.8	
(Italy) Fabrizio Piccareta*	Feb 2013	Feb 2013	1	1	0	0	3	1	+2	100.0	
(England) Tommy Miller* (England) Darren Ward*	Feb 2013	Feb 2013	2	0	1	1	1	2	−1	0.0	
(Scotland) Kevin MacDonald	Feb 2013	Jul 2013	14	4	5	5	20	19	+1	28.6	
(England) Mark Cooper†	Jul 2013	Oct 2015	125	52	27	46	184	179	+5	41.6	
(Republic of Ireland) Lee Power*	Oct 2015	Nov 2015	3	0	1	2	3	5	−2	0.0	
(England) Martin Ling	Nov 2015	Dec 2015	9	5	0	4	14	15	−1	55.6	
(England) Luke Williams†	Dec 2015	May 2017	75	20	22	33	84	109	−25	26.7	
(England) David Flitcroft	Jun 2017	Mar 2018	42	21	3	18	71	66	+5	50.0	
(England) Matt Taylor*	Mar 2018	Mar 2018	1	0	0	1	0	3	−3	0.0	
(England) Phil Brown	Mar 2018	Nov 2018	32	10	11	11	37	39	−2	31.3	
(England) Richie Wellens	Nov 2018	Nov 2020	72	32	17	23	105	86	+19	44.4	
(Republic of Ireland) Noel Hunt*	Nov 2020	Nov 2020	2	1	0	1	2	2	+0	50.0	
(Republic of Ireland) John Sheridan	Nov 2020	Apr 2021	33	8	4	21	34	60	−26	24.2	
(Scotland) Tommy Wright*	Apr 2021	May 2021	4	2	0	2	8	11	−3	50.0	
(England) John McGreal	May 2021	June 2021	0	0	0	0	0	0	+0	—	
(England) Ben Garner^	July 2021	June 2022	56	28	12	16	92	65	+27	50.0	
(England) Scott Lindsey^	June 2022	Jan 2023	30	10	8	12	29	39	−10	33.3	
(Republic of Ireland) Gavin Gunning* (England) Steve Mildenhall*	Jan 2023	Jan 2023	2	1	1	0	8	3	+5	50.0	
(England) Jody Morris^	Jan 2023	May 2023	18	4	4	10	23	25	−2	22.2	
(Republic of Ireland) Gavin Gunning* (England) Steve Mildenhall*	May 2023	May 2023	1	1	0	0	2	1	+1	100.0	
(Wales) Michael Flynn	May 2023	Jan 2024	33	9	9	15	57	70	−13	27.3	
(Republic of Ireland) Gavin Gunning*	Jan 2024	Apr 2024	18	5	5	8	27	29	−2	27.8	
(Republic of Ireland) Mark Kennedy^	May 2024	Oct 2024	16	3	5	8	21	24	−3	18.8	
(England) Marcus Bignot* (Republic of Ireland) Gavin Gunning*	Oct 2024	Oct 2024	1	0	1	0	1	1	+0	0.0	
(England) Ian Holloway	Oct 2024		91	44	21	26	155	119	+36	48.4	

Key
* Served as caretaker manager.
† Served as caretaker manager before being appointed permanently.
‡ Appointed as Director of Football, but with responsibility for team selection.
^ Appointed as Head Coach

== Managers with honours ==
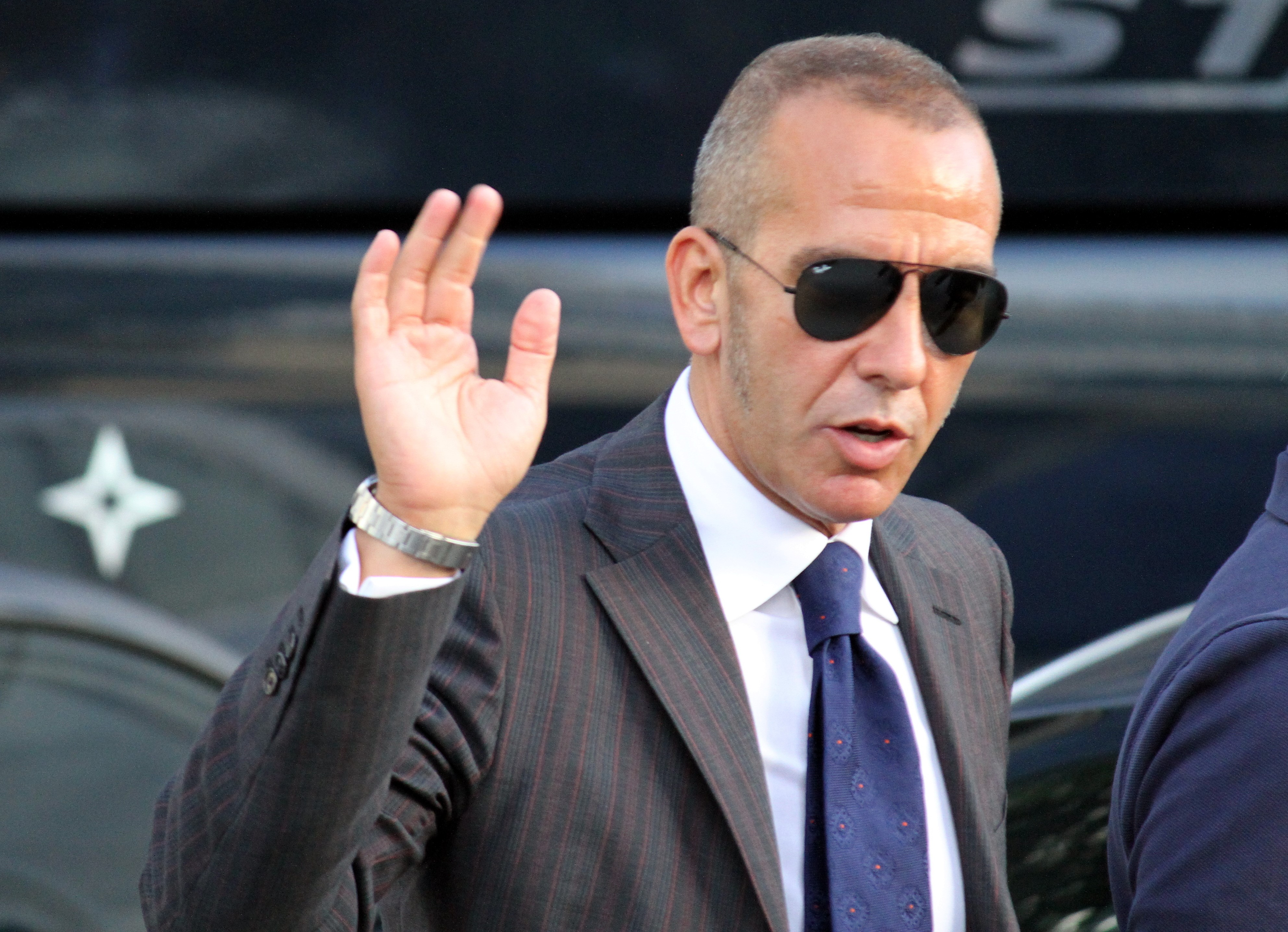
Paolo Di Canio was manager of Swindon Town when they won the League Two title in 2012.

Name	Nat	Tenure	Honours
Sam Allen	England	1902–1933	1910 Dubonnet Cup; 1911 Southern Football League; 1914 Southern Football League
Danny Williams	England	1965–1969	1969 Football League Cup
Fred Ford	England	1967–1974	1969 Anglo-Italian League Cup; 1970 Anglo-Italian Cup
Lou Macari	Scotland	1984–1989	1986 Fourth Division; 1987 Third Division play-offs
Osvaldo Ardiles	Argentina	1988–1991	1990 Second Division play-offs
Glenn Hoddle	England	1991–1993	1993 First Division play-offs
Steve McMahon	England	1994–1998	1996 Second Division
Paolo Di Canio	Italy	2011–2013	2012 League Two
Richie Wellens	England	2018–2020	2020 League Two
