= History of Swindon Town F.C. =

History of an English football club

The history of Swindon Town F.C. stretches back to 1881 and earlier; the club has won League, National and International competitions in its history and played in the FA Premier League.

== Foundation ==
Swindon Town Football Club was founded by Reverend William Pitt between 1879 and 1881, with the club officially using the former date.

Confusion over the original date arose in the mid-1990s and continues to arouse controversy, with the club accepting the earlier date and then reverting to the original during the late 21st century. Former club statistician Paul Plowman researched the early history of the club during the period 1990–95 and discovered newspaper reports of a game in 1879 between Swindon Association Football Club and Rovers F.C.. The report and team photos show William Pitt playing for the team. Reverend Pitt, who was 23 at the time, was the curate of Christchurch, Swindon's central church. He was appointed Rector of Liddington church in 1881 and severed his ties to the club. Plowman was given the role of Swindon Town Retail Manager in 1995 and the kit for the 1995–96 season carried an "Est. 1879" tag, since removed. Further discoveries include an after-dinner speech at the Southern League championship celebrations in 1911 made by Reverend Pitt in which is recalled:

"It was in the autumn of 1879 that some young fellows belonging to the Swindon factory met with him in the King William Street Schools to organise a club. They decided to call it the Swindon Town Football Club, but they found the name rather a mouthful to shout out, so they changed the name to the Spartan Club. They played the first game in a field not far away."

"the rev. gentleman mentioned that his removal from Swindon caused his severance with the club."

In 1883 the Spartan Club renamed itself Swindon Town Football Club.

== 1881–1945: Early years ==
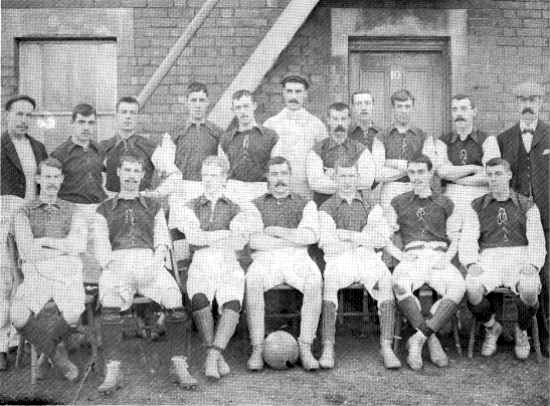
The Swindon Town team of 1898–99 in green

Swindon Town were an amateur club until 1894, playing friendly games against local teams before entering the FA Cup for the first time in 1886. The team also played in the inaugural Wiltshire Cup in 1886 and went on to win it in 6 consecutive years from 1886 to 1892.

On turning professional in 1894, Swindon joined the Southern League which was founded in the same year. After just four wins in sixteen games, the club finished bottom of the table—and were forced to play a Test Match against New Brompton to save their First Division status. In a match played at Caversham in Reading they were beaten 5–1, but gained a reprieve when the league was extended to eleven clubs for the following season.

Games were played at the County Ground from 1896, with the club entering the Western League in 1897 on the decision by the board to play more competitive games. Playing now in two leagues concurrently, Swindon lost form in the Southern League but became Western League champions in 1899.

The team resigned from the Western League in 1902 after finishing bottom of the table and continued to underperform in both League and Cup competitions until 1906 where they reached the first round of the FA Cup. The 1905–06 season saw the club also playing in the United League, again to play more competitive matches.

During the 1907 close season Swindon Town made two player signings that helped changed their fortunes, Jock Walker from Rangers and Harold Fleming. On 5 September 1908 their biggest record win was 10 goal to 2 over Norwich City. Fleming scored twice on his début for the reserve team and was included in the first team for their next game. He became the season's top scorer with 17 goals and helped Swindon progress to the third round of the FA Cup.

Fleming, a legend in the Town with a statue in the County Ground and a nearby road named after him, scored 202 goals in 332 games for Swindon between 1907 and 1924 and was capped eleven times for England.

In the 1909–1910 season Swindon reached the FA Cup semi-finals, losing to Newcastle United who subsequently defeated Barnsley in the final. Barnsley and Swindon were invited to compete for the Dubonnet Cup in a match played at the Parc des Princes Stadium in Paris. The result was a 2–1 victory for Swindon with Harold Fleming scoring both of the Town's goals. One of football's larger trophies, the Dubonnet Cup weighs in at nearly a hundredweight.

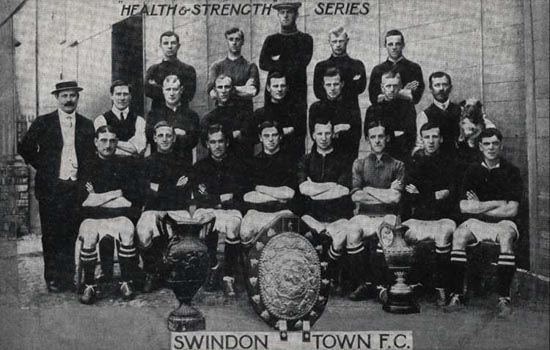
Swindon Town team for the 1911–12 season, posing with the Dubonnet Cup

In the following season, 1910–1911, the team won the Southern League championship, earning them a Charity Shield match with the Football League champions Manchester United. This, the highest-scoring Charity Shield game to date, was played on 25 September 1911 at Stamford Bridge. Swindon scored four goals, while United managed eight. Proceeds from the sale of tickets at this game were donated to the survivors of the RMS Titanic sinking the following year.

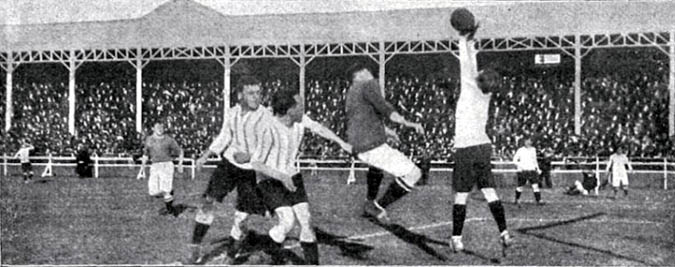
Swindon Town playing Argentina national team in Buenos Aires, July 1912

In 1911–1912 the team again reached the FA Cup semi-finals, this time being knocked out by Barnsley after a replay.

Swindon became Southern League champions for the second and last time in 1914. After the end of the following season, representatives of all leagues met in Blackpool on 3 July 1915 and officially suspended football leagues owing to the outbreak of World War I.

The club continued to play friendly games against local opposition during the conflict and also against military teams from the Wiltshire Regiment of Royal Engineers and the Army Flying Corp. Lt Freddie Wheatcroft, a former Swindon centre-forward, was killed in action in Bourlon in November 1917. Wheatcroft was the only casualty for the club during the War.

Chart of yearly table positions of Swindon Town in the League.

The leagues restarted in 1919 and in 1920 Swindon entered the Football League as a founding member of Division Three and defeated Luton Town 9–1 in their first game of the season. This result stands as a record for the club in League matches. However, it would be more than 40 years before promotion was achieved.

In 1921 the Third Division became the Third Division South following the creation of a Northern section. Swindon were never promoted or relegated, although it did have to apply for re-election at the end of the 1932–1933, 1955–1956 and 1956–1957 seasons.

The club reached the quarter-finals of the FA Cup in 1924, a feat they have only matched only once since then, in the 1968–69 season. Another club cup record was set in 1925–26 when Swindon beat Farnham United Breweries 10–1 in the first round. The club's worst FA Cup defeat followed in the 1929–30 season, when they lost 10–1 to Manchester City.

Harold Fleming retired in 1924 and two years later, in 1926, Harry Morris, Swindon's greatest ever goalscorer, joined the club. In his first game on 28 August 1926, in which Swindon Town beat Southend United 5–1, he scored the first of eighteen hat-tricks. In his seven seasons at the club Morris was top goalscorer every year, accumulated 229 goals in 279 games and set four other club records that were still unbeaten nearly a century later.

Morris's final season with the club, 1932–33, was a difficult one, which finished with having to apply for re-election to the league after finishing bottom of the table. The team finished mid-table for the rest of the 1930s, with the period probably best illustrated with the two games over the Christmas period of 1938: Swindon played Newport at home on Boxing day and won 8–0; in the return match a day later the club lost 6–4.

== 1939–45: War years ==
Three games into the 1939–40 season, the Football League was cancelled due to the outbreak of World War II. Swindon Town joined the Wartime South West Regional League and, owing to military call-ups, fielded a total of 46 different players during the season. These players included staff and wartime guests (such as Danny Blanchflower), with some retired players associated with the club also taking part.

At the end of the 1939–40 season, the War Department requisitioned the County Ground for use as a Prisoner-of-war camp, Swindon Town as a football club effectively ceased to be for the duration. The club's assets and players were sold or transferred until the season restarted.

Three Swindon Town F.C players—Alan Fowler, Willie Imrie and Dennis Olney—were killed in action during the war and are commemorated with a memorial inside the ground above the players tunnel.

== 1945–79: Era of success ==
The post-war era saw Swindon competing in the lower divisions of the English League, though in 1963 the club was promoted to the Second Division after finishing 2nd in Division 3 in season 1962–63. The club was relegated two years later. However the club found shrewd managers in Bert Head and Danny Williams. On Saturday 15 March 1969 Swindon beat Arsenal 3–1 to win the League Cup for the only time in the club's history.This year also saw Swindon go back to the Second Division after again finishing second in the Third Division on goal average with Watford and Swindon joint on 64 points. The scorer of two of the goals in the League Cup final, Don Rogers, was also in form to help Swindon beat SSC Napoli 3–0 to win the 1970 Anglo-Italian Cup. Swindon also beat AS Roma 5–3 over two legs to win the inaugural Anglo-Italian League Cup Winners' Cup.

== 1980–91: Fall and rise ==
Swindon reached their lowest ebb in 1982 when they were relegated to the Fourth Division, and did not leave the league's basement division until 1986 when they were Fourth Division champions. The club achieved a Football League record of 102 points in the season. A year later they won the Second Division relegation/Third Division promotion playoffs to achieve a second successive promotion.Manager Lou Macari left in 1989 to take charge of West Ham United. Veteran midfielder Ossie Ardiles replaced Macari and in his first season they were Second Division play-off winners.

However, Swindon later admitted 36 charges of breaching league rules (a scandal which saw their chairman Brian Hillier being given a six-month prison sentence and chief accountant Vince Farrar being put on probation) and were relegated to the Third Division — giving Sunderland promotion to the First Division and Tranmere Rovers to the Second Division. An appeal saw Swindon being allowed to stay in the Second Division.

Three weeks before the start of the 1989–90 season, The People published revelations that chairman Brian Hillier had put money on Swindon winning Division Three in 1987, as an insurance policy for player bonuses. Two months later the allegations worsened, with Hillier accused of putting money on the Town to lose in the FA Cup game at Newcastle United two years previously (which the team lost 5–0). Hillier was found guilty and was banned from football for six months, later increased to three years on appeal. Macari was fined £1,000 for his part in the scandal—and when he chose to appeal, West Ham United forced his resignation. The People released a third exposé in January 1990, this time alleging illegal payments to players. Despite this, Swindon Town beat table-topping Leeds United to go into third place in the league, and at the end of the season, they finished fourth, their highest league position ever, to go into the play-offs. Shortly before the last game of the season, Hillier, Macari, captain Colin Calderwood and secretary Vince Farrar were all arrested and questioned by Inland Revenue officials over a tax fraud conspiracy. Calderwood was released without charge, and the others were given bail. On the pitch, Swindon Town went on to defeat Blackburn Rovers over two legs to reach the final at Wembley, only their second appearance at the ground in their history.

On 28 May 1990 Swindon Town played in the Division 2 play-off final against Sunderland. In a match they completely dominated, Alan McLoughlin scored the only goal, a deflected effort, to defeat Sunderland and win promotion to the First Division. The joy was short-lived, though, as just ten days later, the Football League decided to demote the team two divisions, after they admitted 36 breaches of League rules—35 of which are related to illegal payments. The Swindon board immediately appealed, but High Court action was dropped due to lack of funding, and the fans protested, thousands signing a "1st not 3rd" petition. The FA Appeal Panel reduced the demotion to just one division, and Swindon were denied their first ever taste of top-flight football.

Hillier was eventually jailed, whilst Farrar and former club secretary Dave King received suspended sentences.

The team's form dipped in 1990–91 and by the time Ossie Ardiles moved to Newcastle United in March 1991 they were just above the Second Division drop zone. Former Tottenham midfielder Glenn Hoddle, 33, was named as Swindon's new player-manager and helped the Robins crush any remaining relegation fears.

== 1991–99: The yoyo years ==
The "diamond" crest unveiled in 1991

Swindon progressed well during Hoddle's first full season as manager and just missed out on the Second Division play-offs, having briefly topped the table in October. A year later they beat Leicester City 4–3 in the new Football League Division One play-off final to achieve promotion to the Premiership, bringing top-division football to the club for the first time.

Hoddle moved to Chelsea during the summer of 1993 and was replaced by assistant John Gorman, but Swindon never adjusted to the pace of Premiership football. They went down with a dismal record of just five wins, as well as having conceded 100 goals — the latter record took 30 years to be broken, by Sheffield United in the 2023-24 season. Gorman was sacked in November 1994 with Swindon struggling near the foot of Division One. 33-year-old Manchester City midfielder Steve McMahon took over but, despite a run to the League Cup semi-finals, Swindon suffered a second successive relegation and slipped into Division Two. They might have survived if high-scoring Norwegian striker Jan Åge Fjørtoft had stayed, but he was sold to Middlesbrough on transfer deadline day.

McMahon succeeded in getting Swindon back into Division One at the first attempt, as they won the Division Two championship in 1996. But the club's financial state was getting more precarious and Swindon could not afford to build a side that might be able to win promotion to the Premiership; his only significant summer signing was the underwhelming Gary Elkins from Wimbledon.

Swindon survived the next season in Division One, finishing in 19th position and escaping relegation by eight points. Then, before the 1997–8 season, manager McMahon promised Swindon fans that if the team failed to make the play-offs, the club would refund the increase in season ticket prices between the 1995–6 and 1997–8 seasons. Swindon subsequently finished in a lowly 18th position and the increases were indeed refunded. However, in March 1998, the club then summarily increased all ticket prices by £2.50 in attempt to clear the debt.

McMahon remained as manager until September 1998, when he left by mutual consent after Swindon had lost 5 of the 9 opening games of the 1998–99 season. He was replaced by Jimmy Quinn, who had taken Reading to the Division One play-off final in 1995.

Swindon's financial problems came to a head during the 1999–2000 season when in January 2000 Swindon—£4m in debt and losing £25,000 a week—went into administration for the first time. Chairman Rikki Hunt was forced to resign and 15 members of staff were made redundant. At one point manager Jimmy Quinn was told not to pick midfielder Robin Hulbert because one more appearance would trigger a £25,000 payment to Everton under the terms of his 1996 transfer. Swindon's future was safeguarded when a consortium headed by business tycoon Terry Brady took over the club and they came out of administration towards the end of the season. But it was too late to save Swindon's place in Division One — they had already been relegated in bottom place. The club's new owner sacked manager Jimmy Quinn and appointed Colin Todd — who had won promotion to the Premiership with Bolton in 1997 — as manager, in hope of getting the club's fortunes back on track.

== 2000–2007 ==
Swindon had a dismal start to the 2000–01 season and Todd quit in November to take the assistant manager's job at Premiership side Derby County. Todd's assistant, Andy King, stepped up to the manager's seat and remained there for the rest of the season. He achieved survival in Division Two but his short-term contract was not renewed at the end of the season.

Former Liverpool manager Roy Evans was brought in as Director of Football, with 33-year-old former Liverpool defender Neil Ruddock being employed as player-coach. But Evans had left by Christmas, with Andy King beginning his second spell as manager.

In December 2002, club benefactor Sir Seton Wills indicated his unwillingness to continue bailing the club out financially: "it's been indicated, by the Wills family, that they're no longer prepared to keep underwriting the losses and quite understandably." Swindon's biggest shareholder, Sir Seton is estimated to have given the club £10million over the years including underwriting a £800,000 debt from the 2001–02 season.

On the pitch, Andy King signed the Chelsea reserve striker Sam Parkin, whose 26 goals in 2002-03 saw Swindon finish tenth in Division Two.

Parkin was joined by former Birmingham and Watford striker Tommy Mooney for the 2003–04 season. Their prolific goalscoring combined helped Swindon achieve a place in the Division Two play-offs, but they lost on penalties to eventual winners Brighton in the play-off semi-finals.

On 22 March 2004 the club announced plans to build a new 22,000-seat stadium in the Shaw area of Swindon. The location of a former landfill, the proposal would have seen the erection of "a hotel and a gym, which would add to the club's revenues." The plans submitted were eventually rejected due to environmental complaints over its situation near to the Great Western Community Forest.

Swindon failed to make the play-offs in 2004–05 and Parkin was transferred to Championship side Ipswich Town. Andy King drafted in QPR forwards Jamie Cureton and Tony Thorpe, but neither player made much of an impact and it was soon clear that Parkin would be a very difficult player to replace successfully.

=== Financial issues and relegation ===
Off the pitch, the club's financial situation continued in its state of flux. It was revealed on 24 January 2005 that an unpaid tax bill of £600,000 had led to HM Customs & Excise issuing a winding up petition against the club. The amount was later paid before the deadline of 2 February 2005. Customs again issued an insolvency order against Swindon Town in August over non-payment of a second tax bill which was finally paid in October. Sir Seton Wills also revealed in May that he and the club's backers had been subsidising the sale of matchday tickets by £6 each.

The club's board indicated that they were losing money due to the facilities at the County Ground not generating enough income to keep the club afloat. Swindon director Bob Holt issued a statement to the town stating: "Please, please come to the games. We know it's expensive, but you have to if you want football in Swindon." Earlier in the season the club had announced its new proposal to redevelop the County Ground, a plan which received the backing of the local council who own the land. Chief Executive Bob Holt commented: "We have been at the County Ground for over 100 years and it is only appropriate that we should explore every opportunity to stay here for another 100 years."

A mixed start to the 2005–06 League One campaign cost Andy King his job and youth development officer Iffy Onuora took over on a temporary contract.

On 30 November 2005 the club revealed that the proposed redevelopment of the County Ground had run into problems, with Swindon Borough Council raising legal and financial concerns about the scheme.

Swindon Town F.C. was also scheduled to appear as part of the Sky TV series Big Ron Manager in 2006, which involved former football manager Ron Atkinson acting as a troubleshooter for a club in difficulties. Filming began in December 2005 at the County Ground, with caretaker-manager Iffy Onuora in charge of Swindon at the time. The appearance of Atkinson at the club resulted in widespread press speculation that he was going to take over the management of the team, which was denied. Following the disruption caused by this and the producers' wish for more backroom access, the television crew were asked to leave the club's premises in January 2006.

Onuora was unable to save Swindon from relegation and they were officially demoted on 29 April 2006 after failing to win their penultimate game of the season. The relegation meant that they became the first ever former Premiership team to be demoted to football's basement league division, although they were joined by Milton Keynes Dons (previously Wimbledon) on the final day of the season.

On 18 May 2006 Dennis Wise agreed to become the new Swindon Town manager. Former boss Iffy Onuora was offered the chance to stay in a reduced capacity but he turned down the offer and left the club, with Alan Reeves also departing after eight seasons as a player and coach. A press conference was held on Monday 22 May 2006 with the club officially announcing Wise as Iffy Onuora's replacement,; Wise and his assistant manager Gustavo Poyet were in attendance. It was confirmed that Wise and Poyet would be registering themselves as players; this was surprising on Poyet's part as the ex-Real Zaragoza and Chelsea midfielder had retired two years previously after leaving Tottenham Hotspur.

=== Promotion from League Two ===
Swindon won their first six games of the League Two campaign, putting them top of the division and resulting in Dennis Wise winning the Manager of the Month and Christian Roberts winning the player of the month award.

Shockwaves erupted around the County Ground in October when it was announced that Wise and Poyet had agreed to take over at Leeds United. Former player Phil King commented on the period:

"It is typical Swindon Town isn’t it? We got relegated and it was all doom and gloom but then Dennis and Gus arrive and the mood is lifted. Things were looking great, we win the first six games, Paul Ince arrives, I think all Town fans thought they were in dreamland. Then there are all sorts of boardroom kerfuffles, Bill Power leaves, other people leave and now we lose our manager. You could write a book every week on this club, it is ridiculous really. I am pretty gutted as he was the right man for the job. I thought it was a stepping stone for him but I expected him to be here longer than this."

This was the second time that Swindon had lost a manager to a team associated with Ken Bates, as Glenn Hoddle's move to Chelsea was also arranged by him.

Ady Williams and Barry Hunter took temporary charge until Paul Sturrock was appointed on 7 November 2006. Sturrock won his first game against Carlisle United 3–1 at home in the first round of the FA Cup and his first league game against Torquay United 1–0 away.

On 16 December 2006, Swindon recorded their highest attendance of the season so far of 10,010 at a home win against rivals Bristol Rovers. The game was marred by supporter trouble which resulted in 11 arrests and saw an area of seating in the Arkell's Stand damaged, with the Western Daily Press reporting: "the incident ... ended with damage to 60 seats after they were used as missiles between opposing fans."

Swindon Town were knocked out of the FA Cup on 6 January 2007 after losing 2–1 away to Crystal Palace. Afterwards it was announced that local rivals Bristol Rovers were interested in a ground-share at the County Ground while the Memorial Stadium was redeveloped; fans and TrustSTFC opposed the move with vice-chairman Andy Ratcliffe stating: "I think it’s a double-edged sword to be honest. I quite understand the attraction from the club’s point of view. Obviously it would be extra revenue and that has to be welcome. Against that, I think there is potential for flash points and I think the police and traders would have serious concerns."

Paul Sturrock was awarded the January Manager of the Month prize after winning four out of five games.

==== Stadium development ====
Mike Bowden joined the Board of Directors on 13 December 2006 to take over plans for the redevelopment of the County Ground. He had previously been part of the team assisting Reading with their move to the Madejski Stadium. He announced on 15 December 2006 that the club would begin negotiations with Swindon Borough Council in January 2007 with a view to beginning work.

General Manager Mike Diamandis spoke of the Stadium Redevelopment plans on 20 December 2006, saying: "We hope to stay at the County Ground and would love to redevelop it into a modern complex. But we have been approached to move to junction 17 of the M4 [near Chippenham], and it is our jobs to look at that. Our preferred route is to stay in Swindon."

Bill Power announced on 10 January 2007 his willingness to back any stadium plan submitted by TrustSTFC, the supporters' trust. He stated "The Trust plan has much to admire in that both the football club and the local community make significant long-term gains in terms of leisure facilities and sustainable income."

==== Takeover plans and club financial history revealed ====
After the 1–0 opening win at Hartlepool United, high-ranking Swindon officials Mark Devlin (Chief Executive) and Mike Sullivan (Marketing Manager) along with possible financial investor Bill Power and Devlin's son Stan were involved in a plane crash in Buckinghamshire. No fatalities occurred but all suffered significant injuries.

In mid- to late September rumours of troubles behind the scenes began. Rumours emerged of a rift between various parties on Town's board. Potential financial backer Bill Power withdrew all interests with the club citing his plane crash injuries as the reason behind his decision. Elsewhere, after making confidential comments about Dennis Wise known to the media prior to the away League game at Wycombe Wanderers, board member Bob Holt was forced to resign. Days later, long-term backers James and Sir Seton Wills made a statement—signed by James Wills only—indicating that they would cut all ties with the club if they are not respected. The James Wills statement openly criticised Chief Executive Mark Devlin, revealing that the club had overspent by the tune of £750,000 for this year. Devlin strongly denied this claim stating that all significant player expenditure had been sanctioned by Sir Seton Wills and Bill Power. Wills insisted that Bill Power's departure from the club was purely because of health reasons and that Power's £1million investment was in the form of shares but that the former investor considered it a loan and wanted it back.

Former director Bill Power launched a takeover plan in conjunction with a fans' consortium in December which was fraught with difficulties. Initially the club said they had not received any paperwork; the revised submission was then delayed. The club's solicitors announced they had received part of the proposal later that week, with Trevor Watkins of Clarke Willmott saying: "A brief proposal has been sent but it does not go into anything in detail." In January 2007 the club responded to the impasse in negotiations with a press release as reported in the Swindon Advertiser:

"Town want 'full details of the individuals involved in the bid, their plans for the club, including the stadium and day to day operation, the monies they will invest and how they intend to engage with other directors and existing shareholders'. The statement said: 'Unless the requested information is provided and a meeting is arranged within the next seven days the club and the Wills family feel they will have no option but to consider this matter closed.'"

The consortium responded:

"We don’t want a slanging match and we certainly don’t want this issue to have a detrimental effect on things on the pitch. Points and issues have been raised and I think the best way to address those is in a confidential meeting, face to face." "We wrote to the club just over a week ago and their solicitors acknowledged that letter. We have so far had no response though about when we can all have a face-to-face meeting. We propose a meeting to discuss all the issues, because it just seems the sensible thing to do. To be honest I am not surprised by anything they do anymore. They can say all the threats and deadlines they want but we won’t come to an end of the matter until they sit down and talk to us."

The club responded to this request with the issuance of a statement reading "In good faith, the club, through its lawyers, are arranging a mutually convenient time for a meeting with Bill Power and his representatives to take place in order to make progress in this matter. It is hoped that this meeting will take place next week." Following this meeting, Bill Power sent a letter to all members of the trust re-affirming his commitment to the takeover bid and also saying "I am committed to fans owning a share in the club and taking part in the club as a business, as well as enjoying direct influences at board level through elected supporter directors."

Swindon chief executive Mark Devlin resigned on 6 February 2007 citing medical reasons relating to his plane crash at the start of the season for his departure.

Mike Diamandis, who first began working with the club as the programme manager in 1990, gave his first ever public interview in December 2006 describing his role and the financial history of the club. Diamandis first joined the club's investors when he was invited to buy the shares that Steve McMahon had left, which he bought through a member of his staff to keep his name off of the club's records. He said he did this to prevent any accusations of conflict of interest. He became involved as a member of back-room staff when the club asked him to find investors in 2000. On viewing the club's finances at the time he said "I was pretty taken aback by what I'd seen"; the club had recently received £3.5million and he was "shocked that so soon after such a big investment the club needed another £1.5million to stay afloat". Part of the group that arranged insolvency, he negotiated the provision of £125,000 each from Willie Carson and Cliff Puffet before an administrator was appointed. At one point Cliff Puffett asked him to help fund that month's salary, which he refused whilet demanding to know why there was a money hole. He was instrumental in creating the consortium to re-take over the club and bring it out of administration. Bob Holt, Willie Carson and Cliff Puffet again invested £125,000 each and developers St. Modwen Properties provided capital to the scheme. Ten months later the group regained control from the club's creditors, saying "We only got control by a mistake they made in that they spent too long electing a board and arranging an AGM".

With the club out of administration, Sir Seton Wills returned and gave the three investors their money back. St Modwen Properties invested £3million into the club after being promised the contract for any improvements to the ground or any future move. The club then raised £750,000 to continue to keep the club afloat, including investment from Bill Power. Diamandis commented on his role: "my expertise is crisis management" and "I believe I've spent all my life learning how to rescue Swindon Town". He called the Wills family "benefactors of the past and benefactors of the future" and stated that 5 years ago the club's balance sheet showed them owing £14million to creditors; in December 2006 Swindon Town's account was £2million in the black. He announced the possibility of a new investor, saying that "they are a seriously successful new entrepreneur that run a new company ... a top 1000 company"; he did not name this party but said that "he lives in the area ... and is a neighbour of Sir Seton" who lives in Chilton Foliat.

The club continued to pay the creditors agreement of £100,000 yearly, a figure Diamandis stated was 2% of the club's annual turnover. He also stated that the Bryan Adams concert at the County Ground to raise funds for the club "never made any money, I think it only made £19,000". The club had to source £500,000 at the beginning of the season to pay players' wages following relegation, if the club were promoted at the end of the 2006–07 season: "I'm hoping in the summer that we'll be able to restructure and find a balance in the books". He said that although the club had received the offer of a move to Chippenham, "our preferred route is to stay in Swindon and redevelop the County Ground" and that "it's in the public domain that this club has needed money each year to keep it going" even to the extent that his own business was owed money from the club of around £136,000 in past printing costs for brochures and publicity material.

==== Sponsorship and logo change ====
After ten years of sponsorship, Nationwide announced that, after the revelation of more financial problems within the club, they were to terminate the sponsorship deal at the end of the 2006–07 season. This also included the cessation of stadium sponsorship. Swindon Town finance director Sandy Gray said on 24 November 2006: "We are in negotiations with someone already. They are very keen to do a sponsorship deal in the football league."

On 7 June 2007 it was announced that Kingswood Construction, a local development company, would undertake a five-year sponsorship of the club. The £100,000-a-year contract included both shirt and stand sponsorship.

The three designs which were voted on by supporters in 2007

The "Steam Train" crest introduced in 2007

On 5 April 2007 the club unveiled plans to change the badge, claiming the diamond badge was correct for the time but did not represent or show any of the club's heritage or history. Swindon offered fans the chance to vote on-line for the three new choices, which were all similar to the original steam train design, and a fourth option of keeping the 1991 design. On 23 April 2007 it was announced that option three of the logo vote was the winner of the poll. Winning the vote with 68% in favour, the new badge included the club name, a Robin, a train—the rail industry being an important part of the Town's heritage—and a football, and re-introduced the town's motto 'Salubritas et Industria'. It was used from the beginning of the 2007–08 season.

== 2007–2011: League One ==
After much negotiation, Swindon Town were taken over by a new consortium during the early stages of the 2007–08 campaign. The appointed chairman-designate, the American Jim Little, also announced former QPR defender Rufus Brevett as Sporting Director and Portuguese agent José Veiga as General Manager.

Paul Sturrock resigned as manager during the season to return to Plymouth Argyle (he had previously been there earlier in the decade) and his successor Maurice Malpas secured Swindon's League One status as they finished 13th with 61 points.

However, the 2008–09 campaign started badly; after winning the first match at home against Tranmere Rovers 3–1, Swindon lost five consecutive matches at home (the first time this had happened since 2000) and there were several calls for Malpas to be replaced. Malpas was sacked on 14 November 2008, with David Byrne taking over temporarily.

Danny Wilson was unveiled as the new manager on 26 December 2008. Wilson helped maintain Swindon's League One status and finished in 15th position, though only 4 points from the relegation zone in his first season in charge.

The 2009–10 season was an improvement, despite the sale of League One top-scorer Simon Cox. The club maintained a play-off position going into the new year, and were at one point in second place with automatic promotion in their own hands. However, a slight slip in form towards the end of the season saw Swindon finish 5th, entering the play-offs against Charlton Athletic. Swindon won the tie on penalties and went on to play in the Football League One play-offs final against Millwall at Wembley for a place in the Football League Championship. However, they lost 1–0 in what was their 1st defeat in 4 appearances at Wembley.

After losing the final Swindon lost their top scorer Billy Paynter who joined Leeds United on a free transfer, and sold club captain Gordon Greer. Still, many bookmakers had Swindon as one of the favourites for promotion to the Championship going into the 2010–11 season. Inconsist form left Swindon in mid-table for much of the season, however a 4–2 win at Charlton Athletic in January left fans hoping for a late-season surge. Instead, the team did not win again for 19 matches. When Danny Wilson resigned on March 2, Paul Hart was brought in but failed to save the Robins, and on 25 April 2011 Swindon were relegated to League Two after losing 3–1 to Sheffield Wednesday FC. Paul Hart was replaced for the last two games of the season by former player and current reserve and youth team coach Paul Bodin.

== 2011–2020 ==
Soon after the season ended, the board revealed that high-profile former player Paulo Di Canio would take his first management position at the club. After losing seven of his first thirteen games in charge, Swindon went on a fifteen-match unbeaten run which put them into promotion contention by the midpoint of the 2011–12 season. After a defeat on Boxing Day 2011 to Torquay United, Swindon broke a club record by winning 10 consecutive league games, and by March they were well clear of the chasing pack at the top of League Two. They also enjoyed success in both the FA Cup, beating Premiership side Wigan Athletic in the third round before losing to Championship side Leicester City in the fourth round, and the Football League Trophy, reaching the final at Wembley, where they were runners-up to League One side Chesterfield. On 28 April 2012, Swindon, already promoted, guaranteed their championship of League Two on 28 April after a 5–0 drubbing of Port Vale at the County Ground.

On 18 February 2013, with Swindon riding high in League One and in contention for a second consecutive promotion, Di Canio announced his resignation, alleging mistreatment by the board of directors, including the sale of Matt Ritchie behind his back, and the financial instability of the club at the time. In his place came Kevin MacDonald who had previously held caretaker roles at Leicester City and Aston Villa. MacDonald guided Swindon to the League One play-offs; however, they were knocked out after a penalty shoot-out defeat to Brentford. On 13 July 2013, MacDonald left Swindon Town by mutual consent, only three weeks before the start of the 2013–14 season and only five months after taking the Swindon job.

In the 2014–15 season, Swindon reached the League One Play-off final again where they lost 4–0 to Preston after a season in which they were competing for automatic promotion. They went top of the league after a 3–0 win away to Coventry; however, a 2–0 defeat to Sheffield United was the first of a series of results that saw Swindon's form dip, and a 1–0 defeat to bottom club Yeovil Town meant that Swindon were consigned to finish in the play-offs. They reached Wembley after a record-breaking 5–5 draw (winning 7–6 on aggregate) against Sheffield United, the highest-scoring EFL play-off match in history.

In the 2016–17 season, Swindon were relegated to League Two for a third time; they finished third from bottom on 22 April 2017 after losing 2–1 to Scunthorpe United with only one more fixture on the road in hand. Following this relegation, manager Luke Williams was sacked after Swindon lost 3–0 at Charlton Athletic.

== 2020-present ==
On 9 June 2020, Swindon were crowned League Two champions on the basis of average points per game, matches in the 2019–20 season having been suspended from March due to the COVID-19 pandemic in the United Kingdom. However, in the following season, the pandemic created financial difficulties for the club, with the chairman, Lee Power, warning in February 2021 of potential bankruptcy, and then, in April 2021, being charged with breaching FA regulations concerning the club's ownership and/or funding. On 18 April, manager John Sheridan resigned after winning just eight of 33 matches, with the club seven points from safety with four matches to play. The club's relegation to League Two was confirmed following a 5–0 defeat by Milton Keynes Dons on 24 April 2021.

On 26 May 2021, John McGreal was appointed Swindon manager but, on 25 June 2021, after less than a month in the job, he left Swindon by mutual consent, citing ownership uncertainty which was preventing him signing new players. Chief executive Steve Anderson also left the club on the same day, followed by director of football Paul Jewell. Swindon supporter groups urged fans to boycott games until the ownership problems were resolved, with High Court hearings due to start on 6 September 2021. On 30 June 2021, the Official Supporters Club was told that a deal to transfer ownership to Australian businessman Clem Morfuni's Axis group would be completed "in the next couple of weeks", though the club later complained that the Axis group was delaying payment.

In early July 2021, it emerged that players and staff had not received their June wages, and that the County Ground's owner, Swindon Borough Council, was taking legal action after receiving no rent since April 2020. The EFL described the ownership wrangle as "concerning" and imposed a transfer embargo on the club. In pre-season friendlies at Melksham Town and Hungerford Town, Swindon fielded sides featuring just a few experienced first-team players, with the rest of the squads being composed of youngsters and trialists. The club then cancelled its planned pre-season friendly with Swansea City at the County Ground on 17 July 2021, citing "ongoing logistical and operational issues". On 15 July 2021, it was reported that the club had paid 60% of the outstanding wages due in June. On 21 July 2021, it was reported that Power had transferred ownership of his shares in the club, and that the EFL had granted Morfuni consent to acquire additional shares, having passed its owners' and directors' test. Morfuni appointed Ben Garner as head coach and Ben Chorley as director of football plus Rob Angus (a former Nationwide director) appointed as CEO and, on 26 July 2021, the new management announced their first signing, with midfielder Ben Gladwin returning for a fourth spell at Swindon. On 16 September 2021, Swindon Town was given a suspended three-point deduction by the EFL, relating to the non-payment of player wages in June.

Garner led Swindon to a 6th place finish in the 2021–22 season with the club beaten on penalties by Port Vale in the play-off semi-finals. The manager then left Swindon to join Charlton Athletic in June 2022, being replaced by his former assistant Scott Lindsey, who spent half a season in the role before moving to Crawley Town. On 31 January 2023, Jody Morris was appointed manager; he was sacked on 1 May 2023 after just four wins from 18 games. The side finished the season in 10th place.

On 8 May 2023, Michael Flynn was appointed team manager on a two-year contract, officially taking charge following the last match of the season that same day. Rob Angus stood down as CEO in September 2023. In January 2024, a 2–1 defeat at Crewe meant Swindon had lost ten of their last 15 matches, and Flynn was sacked as manager after just over eight months in charge. Appointed caretaker manager to the end of the season, Gavin Gunning questioned his players' "heart" after they won just two of ten games and dropped to 18th place. Ultimately, the club finished the 2023–2024 season in 19th place and Swindon supporters called for a change in the club's ownership. Morfuni acknowledged the season had not been "up to our club's standards".

The side improved to finish 12th at the end of the 2024–25 season. It started with Mark Kennedy as manager, but he lasted just five months being sacked on 25 October 2024. With the club in 22nd place, Ian Holloway took over and, after earning 36 points from 24 matches, was rewarded in March 2025 with a new long-term contract through to June 2028.

== Notes ==
Swindon have now gone on to win League 2 winning promotion back to League 1.
