= William Baker Pitt =

English priest

William Pitt
- Born: William Baker Pitt; 18 January 1856; Exeter, England
- Died: 21 November 1936 (aged 80); Bournemouth, England
- Occupation: Vicar
- Spouse: Alice Mary Kinneir
- Children: 5

Reverend William Baker Pitt (18 January 1856 – 21 November 1936) was an English clergyman who was the founder of Swindon Town Football Club and also curate of Christ Church, Swindon until 1881 and rector of Liddington from then on.

== Early life ==
Pitt was born in Exeter. His father, Thomas, was a grocer of some standing in his local community. In 1861 the family employed a servant and also a governess for William, who was five years old at the time. He chose to become an Anglican clergyman, rather than a grocer as his father had suggested, and attended the London College of Divinity in 1879. He was ordained as a deacon of the Church of England in 1879, with his first post as curate of Christchurch, Swindon. Lodgings in the town were provided in Bellevue Road by Frederick Osman, a grocer and business associate of his father.

Now 23 years old, Pitt moved into a parish in turbulent times, with the Swindon Advertiser reporting on 29 March 1879 "The circumstances attending the leaving of curate after curate are too vividly remembered in the town to need recapitulation". In the same article, Charles Ellicott, the Bishop of Gloucester and Bristol, regarded Christ Church as "the one black spot" in his diocese. The vicar of Christ Church, Henry Bailly, was outspoken and frequently denounced powerful figures in the community. Amongst the vicar's enemies were Member of Parliament and Lord of the manor Ambrose Lethbridge Goddard, and the editor of the Swindon Advertiser, William Morris.

Pitt settled into his new parish. He established a working relationship with Bailly and became a popular figure in the town, especially amongst younger members of the church through his involvement with the YMCA.

== Football ==
After the arrival of the Great Western Railway in Swindon in the 1830s, Swindon's population soared from 1,200 to 19,000. This was divided between the communities of Old and New Swindon, with the majority in New Swindon where the GWR Works were. Pitt used the formation of a football team to attempt to unite the communities.

Whilst curate of Christ Church, the high church of Swindon, he was recorded as being the captain of Swindon Association Football Club in 1879. Pitt had formed this club to provide recreation for the young men of his parish, which was a theme for the creation of many football clubs founded in this period with 'muscular Christianity' being the vogue. The team played their only recorded match on 29 November 1879 against Rovers F.C.

Pitt recalled the foundation of this club in speech given in September 1911:

"He thought he might venture to say that he was the father of the Swindon Football Club. It was in the autumn of 1879 that some young fellows belonging to the Swindon factory met with him in the King William Street school to organise a club [...] They decided to call it the Swindon Association Football Club, but they found the name rather a mouthful to shout out, so they [later] changed the name to the Spartans. They played the first game on a field not far away, it being kindly lent by Mr Hooper Deacon, who was always a friend of sport."

Pitt was still a member of the Spartans F.C. team when they played St. Mark's Young Men's Friendly Society on 12 November 1881, after which the two teams merged under the name Swindon Football Club.

Appointed in 1881 as the rector and prebendary of Liddington, several miles from Swindon, Pitt ceased his active involvement in the club, relating in 1911: "his removal from Swindon caused his severance with the club".

The team was renamed Swindon Town Football Club in 1883, but confusion as to the official date of establishment remained until 2007. The current club used the date of the 1881 match with St Marks, whilst some fans and researchers prefer 1879. This led to the club's researcher and retail manager Paul Plowman integrating an "Est. 1879" tag onto the team's kit in 1995, which was removed in 1996. The club officially recognised the 1879 establishment in 2007 and integrated the date onto the team's badge.

== Liddington ==
Pitt left Swindon in 1882 to become rector of All Saints' Church in Liddington. He married Alice Mary Kinneir in 1882 in Christ Church; she was the daughter of a solicitor and churchwarden, Henry Kinneir.

Pitt was to remain at Liddington for the next 54 years; the only time he lived elsewhere was during 1916–1917, when he served with the Church Army in France.

William and Alice had five children, Alice born in 1884, William in 1886, Edith in 1887, Clifford in 1889 and Audrey in 1892.

Clifford died on 1 February 1915 in Baumu, British East Africa. An Oxford graduate, he had embarked on a career in Colonial Administration and died aged 26 of acute sunstroke. His parents placed a memorial window for him in Liddington Church.

Alice died in mysterious circumstances on 23 June 1928; she was found dead at the bottom of a well amongst the farm buildings close to the rectory. The coroner's report stated "found drowned in a Well, there being no evidence of her state of mind".

== Death ==
Pitt resigned as rector in 1935 due to severe bronchial disorders and moved with his wife to Bournemouth in the hope that the sea air of the South Coast might alleviate his symptoms. His condition gradually worsened and he suffered long periods of unconsciousness. He contracted pneumonia and died at the age of 80 on 21 November 1936.

Four choristers from Liddington travelled to Bournemouth to bring his body home for burial, with the funeral taking place on 25 November 1936 and conducted by the Bishop of Malmesbury.

He was buried in Liddington churchyard next to his daughter Alice. His wife died seven years later on 17 November 1943 in Braintree, Essex, where she lived with the youngest daughter Audrey. Her body was transported back to Liddington, where she was buried alongside her husband. They lie facing the west door of the church in a grave marked by a large stone cross.

== See also ==
- History of Swindon Town F.C.
