= Sam Allen (football manager) =

English football manager (1868–1946)

Personal information
- Date of birth: 2 January 1868
- Date of death: 1 January 1946 (aged 77)
- Place of death: Swindon, England

Managerial career
- Years: Team
- 1902–1933: Swindon Town

Sam Allen (2 January 1868 – 1 January 1946) was a long serving servant of Swindon Town football club.

A Swindon stalwart, Allen originally joined the club in 1895 as a member of the club's committee. Two years later, he joined the board of directors, before he took control of team affairs prior to the 1902–03 season, becoming the Town's first recognised manager. In an era where the board would have had control over team selection, Allen's job mainly involved assembling a capable team. Slowly but surely, it was a job he did well - turning a team who hadn't yet finished in the top half of the Southern League table, into championship contenders.

By signing Swindon greats such as Jock Walker and Harold Fleming, Allen led the club during one of the most successful spells in their history. Between 1908 and 1914, Swindon won the Southern League title twice, finished as runners-up three times, and reached the semi-finals of the FA Cup twice - as well as winning the Dubonnet Cup.

Unfortunately, the First World War interrupted Swindon's success, and by the time football resumed in 1919, Allen again had to virtually recreate the side. After a disappointing first season following the hostilities, the Town joined the Football League in 1920, becoming a founder member of Division Three (South). Over the next eight seasons, Swindon finished in the top six in every season bar one - but with only one promotion spot, they failed to get out of the division. Allen again highlighted his eye for a player with his signing of Harry Morris - the club's record goalscorer, and over this period, the Town recorded their two biggest victories - 9–1 vs Luton Town in their first league match, and 10–1 vs Farnham in the FA Cup in 1925.

From 1929, Swindon fell into a gradual decline - not helped by the board's insistence on selling players to balance the books. Allen was obviously not pleased with this, and, after the Town were forced to apply for re-election in 1933, he willingly relinquished his team responsibilities, reverting to a secretarial position. This moved allowed the board to appoint Ted Vizard as the club's first full-time team manager, in the modern sense of the word.

Amazingly, Allen remained as Swindon's secretary for thirteen more years, taking his total length of service to 51 years. He received the Football League's long service award in 1941, as he kept the club alive during World War Two, when the Town, unlike other clubs, completely closed down for the duration. He died whilst still in office, on 1 January 1946 - the report of his funeral covering three columns in the Evening Advertiser.
