= Nathaniel Torporley =

English mathematician and astrologer

Nathaniel Torporley (1564–1632) was an English clergyman, mathematician, and astrologer.

== Life ==
He was born in Shropshire, and was admitted to Shrewsbury free grammar school as an 'oppidan' in 1571. He matriculated at Christ Church, Oxford, 17 November 1581, as a 'plebeian,' and graduated B.A. on 5 February 1584; and proceeded M.A. from Brasenose College on 8 July 1591. Entering holy orders, he was appointed rector of Salwarpe in Worcestershire on 14 June 1608, a living he held until 1622. He also occurs as rector of Liddington, Wiltshire, in 1611, though he seems to have resided chiefly at Sion College, London.

Torporley associated with Thomas Harriot and acquired a knowledge of mathematics and astronomy. He was supported by Henry Percy, 9th Earl of Northumberland, who for several years gave him an annual pension. On 27 November 1605, just after the discovery of the Gunpowder Plot, Torporley was examined by the council for having cast the king's nativity. For two or more years he resided in France, and was amanuensis to François Viète of Fontenay, against whom he published a pamphlet under the name of Poulterey. He died in Sion College, London, and was buried in St. Alphege's Church on 17 April 1632.

== Works ==
He published Diclides Coelometricae; seu Valuae Astronomicae universales, omnia artis totius munera Psephophoretica in sat modicis Finibus Duarum Tabularum methodo Nova, generali et facillima continentes, London, 1602. With this was presented a preface, entitled Directionis accuratae consummata Doctrina, Astrologis hactenus plurimum desiderata; and Tabula praemissilis ad Declinationes et coeli meditationes, in five parts.

He left a nuncupative will, dated 14 April 1632, by which he bequeathed to the library of Sion College all his mathematical books, astronomical instruments, notes, maps, and a brass clock. Among these books were some manuscripts: Congestor: Opus Mathematicum, Philosophia, Atomorum Atopia demonstrata, Corrector Analyticus Artis posthunc. Administration of the will was granted on 6 January 1633 to his sister, Susanna Tasker.

He was executor of the papers of Harriot, his teacher. He worked over them, but the work that eventually appeared, the Artis Analyticae Praxis (1631), was edited together by Walter Warner.
