= Liddington =

Village in Wiltshire, England

Coordinates: 51.532°N 1.703°W

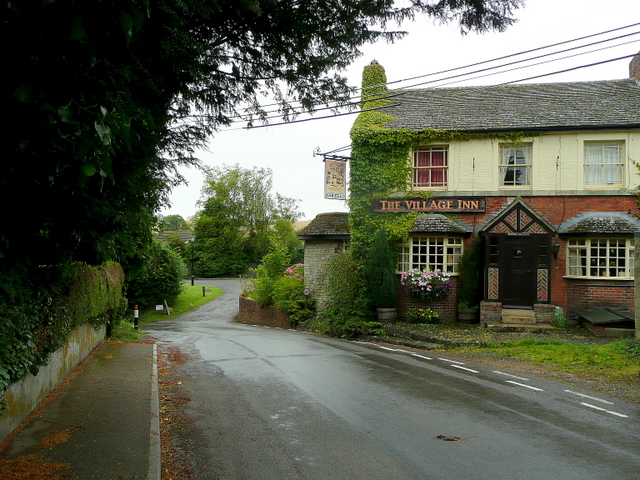
- The Village Inn, Liddington, in 2009

- Location within Wiltshire
- Population: 593 (in 2021)
- OS grid reference: SU207815
- Civil parish: Liddington
- Unitary authority: Swindon
- Ceremonial county: Wiltshire
- Region: South West
- Country: England
- Sovereign state: United Kingdom
- Post town: Swindon
- Postcode district: SN4
- Dialling code: 01793
- Police: Wiltshire
- Fire: Dorset and Wiltshire
- Ambulance: South Western
- UK Parliament: East Wiltshire
- Website: Parish Council

Liddington is a village and civil parish in the Borough of Swindon, England. The village is about a mile beyond the south-east edge of Swindon's built-up area, close to junction 15 of the M4 motorway, which is approximately 2 miles (3.2 km) away via the B4192.

== History ==
The parish has been an area of settlement since the earliest times. The ancient Ridgeway traverses the parish just north of the village and the Iron Age hill-fort known as Liddington Castle, which is a scheduled monument, overlooks the present-day village. Liddington is recorded in the late Saxon period, around 940 AD. The Domesday Book of 1086 refers to the settlement as Ledentone. The population of the parish peaked at 454 in 1841 and then gradually declined.

The spelling Lyddington has sometimes been used, and still appears in the name of the Church of England parish.

Most of the village was designated as a Conservation Area in 1990. The Great Western Hospital, a large district hospital, was built in the north-west corner of the parish in 2002.

== Parish church ==
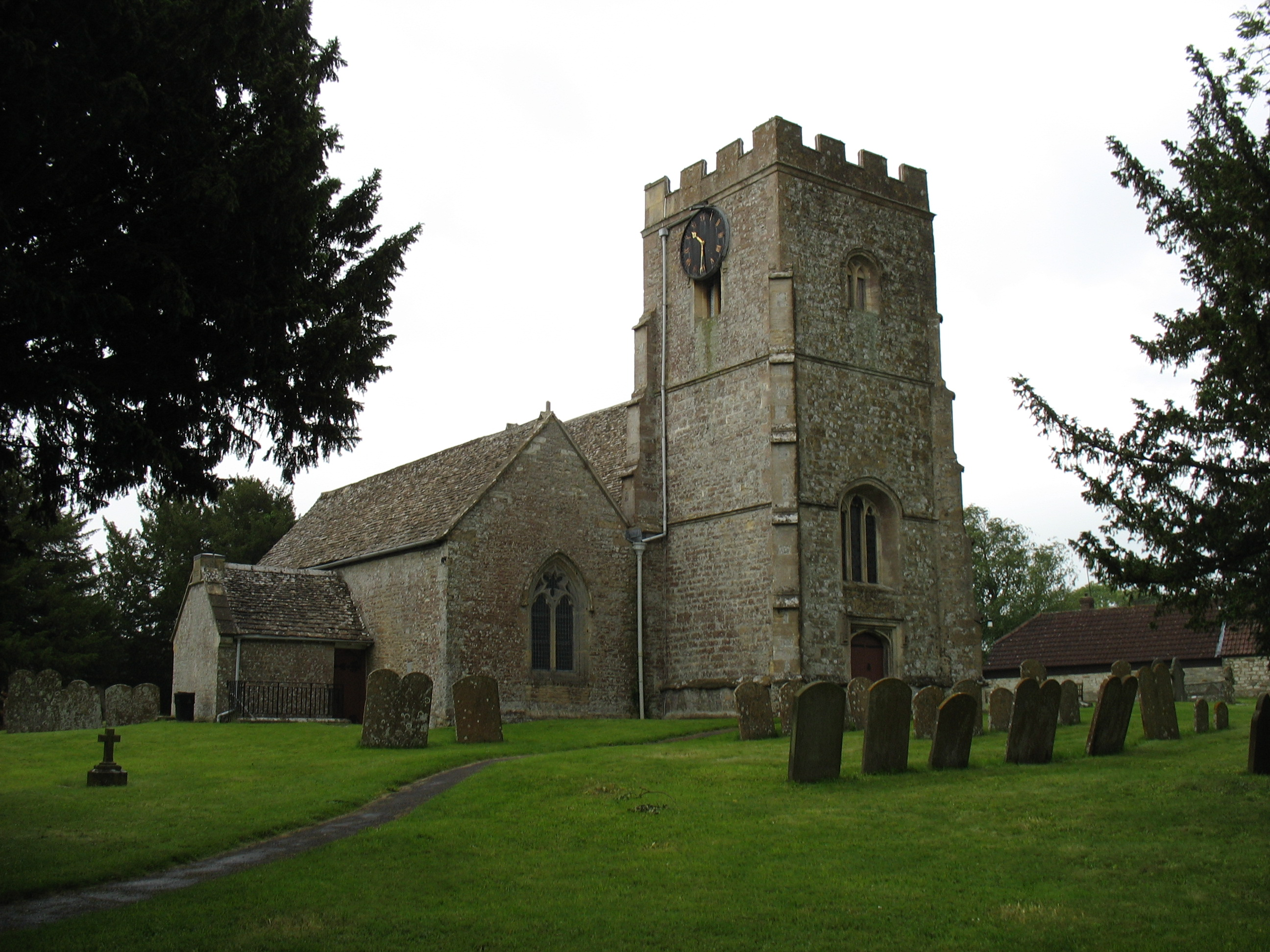
All Saints Church

A church at Liddington is first mentioned in 1291. All Saints, the Church of England parish church, stands south of the present village and is a Grade I listed building. It has a 13th-century chancel, a three-bay nave from the 14th or 15th century, and a plain three-stage west tower. The north aisle is described by Historic England as 13th-century and little altered. The arches below the tower are off-centre, indicating that there was a south aisle in the past. The church was heavily restored in 1847 by J. H. Hakewill; the work included renewal of most windows and the nave roof, and the addition of the south porch.

The oldest feature of the church is the font, a tapered stone tub of c.1200 on a 19th-century base. The original ring of five bells, now unringable, includes three cast in 1663 by Roger and William Purdue. A new ring of six dated 2016 by John Taylor & Co is installed below them. The churchyard has the remains of a 15th-century cross: only the base and a stump of the shaft.

The church was anciently attached to Shaftesbury Abbey as a prebend, and the prebendaries or rectors – who did not live at Liddington – provided a vicar to serve the church. Although the prebend ceased after William Sharington bought the manor in 1543, it came back into use towards the end of the 17th century and was still recognised in 1975.

The benefice was united with that of Wanborough in 1975, and at some point the parishes were united too. Today the parish is part of a larger benefice which also covers Bishopstone and Hinton Parva.

Notable rectors include the mathematician Nathaniel Torporley (around 1611) and William Baker Pitt (from 1882 to 1935, remembered as the founder of Swindon Town Football Club).

== 'Starfish' decoy control bunker ==
Liddington Hill was the site of a control bunker for a World War II 'Starfish' bombing decoy site. This would have been used to control fires, which would have acted as a decoy to enemy planes targeting the town of Swindon to the north. The bunker had a hatch in its concrete roof and consisted of two rooms off a central passage; the room on the right housed generators, while the control room was on the left.

== Economy ==
Just east of the village is the children's adventure centre PGL Liddington, based at the historic King Edward's Place. Whilst the centre takes its name from Liddington as the nearest village, the centre is in the neighbouring parish of Wanborough.
