= Swindon Town F.C. =

Association football club in England

Swindon Town
- Full name: Swindon Town Football Club
- Nickname: The Robins
- Founded: 1879; 147 years ago
- Ground: The County Ground
- Capacity: 15,728
- Owner(s): Clem Morfuni, Hollie Kiely & Bethany Parlodorio
- Chairman: Clem Morfuni
- Manager: Ian Holloway
- League: EFL League Two
- 2025–26: EFL League Two, 9th of 24
- Website: swindontownfc.co.uk
Home colours	Away colours	Third colours

Swindon Town Football Club is a professional association football club based in Swindon, Wiltshire, England. The team, known as the "Robins", currently compete in EFL League Two, the fourth level of the English football league system.

Founded as Swindon AFC in 1879, the club became Spartans the next year, before finally settling on the name Swindon Town in 1883. It became professional in 1894 as a founding member of the Southern League, later also entering the Western League between 1897 and 1902. The club was crowned Western League champion in 1898–99 and Southern League champion in 1910–11 and 1913–14, before being elected into the Football League in 1920. It remained in the third tier for 43 years until finally securing promotion into the Second Division in 1962–63, where it remained for just two seasons. The team lifted the League Cup after beating Arsenal 3–1 in the 1969 final, and went on to secure promotion at the end of the 1968–69 season with the help of talismanic winger Don Rogers. Relegated again in 1973–74, the club dropped into the fourth tier for the first time at the end of the 1981–82 season.

Swindon won the Fourth Division title in 1985–86 and secured a second successive promotion the following season under the stewardship of Lou Macari. They went on to claim victory in the 1990 Second Division play-off final under Osvaldo Ardiles, but were denied promotion into the top-flight after admitting to breaching Football League regulations. Glenn Hoddle coached the team to victory in the 1993 play-off final to finally secure a place in the top-flight for the first time in the club's history. However they were relegated out of the Premier League at the end of the 1993–94 season and dropped into the third tier with a second consecutive relegation. Promoted again as champions to avoid an FA expulsion and a hat-trick of relegations in 1995–96, they remained in the second tier for four seasons until relegation in the 1999–2000 season. They dropped into the fourth tier League Two in the 2005–06 for the first time since 1986. Since then, Swindon have spent their time between the third and fourth tiers; earning promotion from League Two on three occasions.

Their home colours are red and white and their current away colours are sky blue and white. Since 1896 the club has played home matches at the County Ground, currently known as the Nigel Eady County Ground, which now has a capacity of 15,547. Hall of Fame inductee John Trollope played 770 league games for the club between 1960 and 1980, a professional record in English football until it was broken in 2023 by Dean Lewington.

== History ==
=== Early history ===
Swindon Town Football Club was founded by Reverend William Pitt of Liddington in 1879. The team turned professional in 1894 and joined the Southern League which was founded in the same year. During this period Septimus Atterbury played for the club.

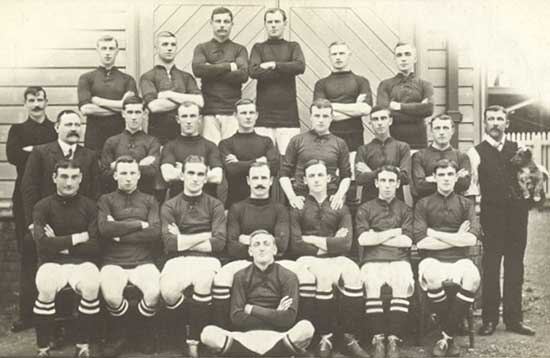
The Swindon Town team for the 1909–10 season

Swindon reached the FA Cup semi-finals for the first time in the 1909–10 season, losing to eventual winners Newcastle United. Barnsley and Swindon were invited to compete for the Dubonnet Cup in 1910 at the Parc des Princes Stadium in Paris. The result was a 2–1 victory for Swindon with Harold Fleming scoring both of the club's goals.

The following season, 1910–11, Swindon Town won the Southern League championship, earning them a Charity Shield match with the Football League champions Manchester United. This, the highest-scoring Charity Shield game to date, was played on 25 September 1911 at Stamford Bridge with Manchester United winning 8–4. Some of the proceeds of this game were later donated to the survivors of the Titanic. In 1912 Swindon Town reached the semi-finals of the FA Cup for a second time in 3 years, losing to Barnsley after a replay 1–0.

Swindon's exploits at this time owed a lot to the skilful forward H.J. Fleming who was capped by England 11 times between 1909 and 1914 despite playing outside the Football League. Fleming remained with Swindon throughout a playing career spanning 1907 and 1924 and went on to live in the town for his entire life.

Swindon entered the Football League in 1920 as a founding member of Division Three and defeated Luton Town 9–1 in their first game of the season. This result stands as a record for the club in League matches.

After the outbreak of World War II, the War Department took over the County Ground in 1940, where for a while POWs (Prisoners of War) were housed in huts placed on the pitch; for this the club received compensation of £4,570 in 1945. World War II affected Swindon Town more than most other football clubs and the club was almost disbanded; the club needed a large amount of time to recover and for this reason it failed to make any real impression in the league and would not climb into the second division until 1963 when they finished runners up to Northampton Town. The club was relegated back into Division Three in 1965, but it was about to create a sensation.

=== 1969–2000 ===
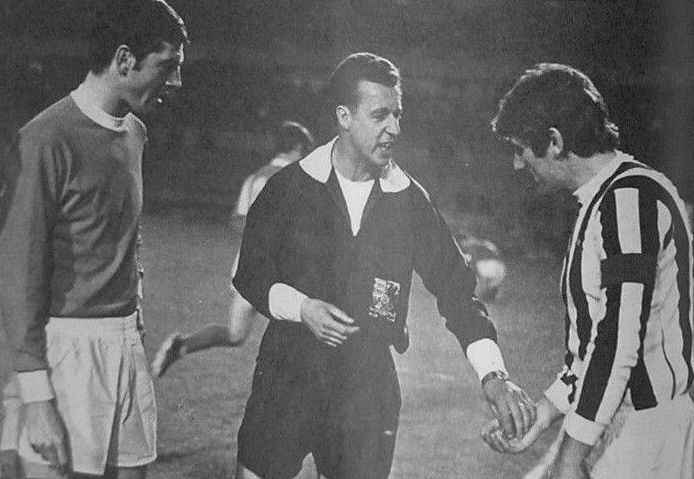
The coin toss before the away game in Turin versus Juventus in the victorious 1970 Anglo-Italian Cup

In 1969, Swindon beat Arsenal 3–1 to win the League Cup for the only time in the club's history. As winners of the League Cup, Swindon were assured of a place in their first European competition: the Inter-Cities Fairs Cup. However, the Football Association had previously agreed to inclusion criteria with the organizers which mandated that only League Cup winners from Division One would be able to take part. As the team were not eligible, the short-lived Anglo-Italian competitions were created to give teams from lower divisions experience in Europe. The first of these, the 1969 Anglo-Italian League Cup, was contested over two legs against Coppa Italia winners AS Roma. Swindon won 5–2, with the scorer of two goals in the League Cup final – Don Rogers – scoring once and new acquisition Arthur Horsfield acquiring his first hat-trick for the club. The team then went on to win the 1970 Anglo-Italian Cup competition in a tournament beset by hooliganism. The final against SSC Napoli was abandoned after 79 minutes following pitch invasions and a missile barrage, with teargas being employed to allow the teams to return to the dressing room.

Following management changes, Swindon had a long unsuccessful period culminating in them being relegated in 1982 to the Fourth Division, the lowest professional Football League at the time. They were eventually promoted as champions in 1986 with the club achieving a Football League record of 102 points, the second club to score over 100 points in a season, York City having totalled 101 two years earlier. A year later they won the Third Division play-offs to achieve a second successive promotion. Promotion campaign Manager Lou Macari left in 1989 to take charge of West Ham United with veteran midfielder, and former Argentine international, Osvaldo Ardiles replacing him. In his first season, Swindon were Second Division play-off winners, but the club later admitted 36 charges of breaching league rules, 35 due to illegal payments made to players, and were relegated to the Third Division — giving Sunderland promotion to the First Division and Tranmere Rovers to the Second Division. The scandal saw then-chairman Brian Hillier being given a six-month prison sentence and chief accountant Vince Farrar being put on probation. A later appeal saw Swindon Town being allowed to stay in the Second Division.

Ardiles remained in charge until March 1991, when he departed for Newcastle United and was succeeded by new player-manager Glenn Hoddle. Swindon progressed well during the 1991–92 season, Hoddle's first full season as manager, and just missed out on the Second Division play-offs, having briefly led the table in the autumn. A year later they beat Leicester City 4–3 in the new Division One play-off final to achieve promotion to the Premier League — bringing top-division football to the club for the first time.

Hoddle moved to Chelsea before the 1993–94 FA Premier League season began, and was replaced by assistant John Gorman, but Swindon never adjusted to the pace of Premier League football. They were relegated after recording only five wins and conceding 100 goals — the latter record stood until Sheffield United broke it in 2024 — and have never returned to the top flight. One of the few successes of the season was a 2–2 draw against champions Manchester United in the league.

The following year, Swindon were relegated for the second consecutive time and slipped into Division Two. Gorman had been sacked as manager in November 1994, and although his successor, player-manager Steve McMahon, was unable to avoid relegation, he did take Swindon to the semi-finals of the League Cup. McMahon then succeeded in getting Swindon back into Division One on his first attempt, winning the Division Two championship in 1995–96. McMahon remained as manager until September 1998, when he left by mutual consent after Swindon lost five of their nine opening games of the 1998–99 season.

=== 2000–2020 ===
The club then went through five managers in five years (Andy King was appointed twice), during which time they were again relegated into Division Two. The highlight of the next few seasons was a fifth-place finish in 2003–04 as financial troubles persisted. A first-round playoff loss to Brighton & Hove Albion on penalties meant Swindon extended their stay in the third tier, now renamed League One.

The club has been beset by financial difficulties throughout its recent history, having been placed into administration twice and also twice fought off winding-up orders from Her Majesty's Customs and Excise over unpaid tax. The board was paying £100,000 to creditors annually (2% of the annual turnover), and only managed to begin the 2006–07 season after sourcing £500,000 to pay for players' wages.

In 2006, caretaker manager (and former player) Iffy Onuora was unable to save Swindon from relegation to League Two meaning they became the first ever former Premier League team to be relegated to the lowest Football League division.

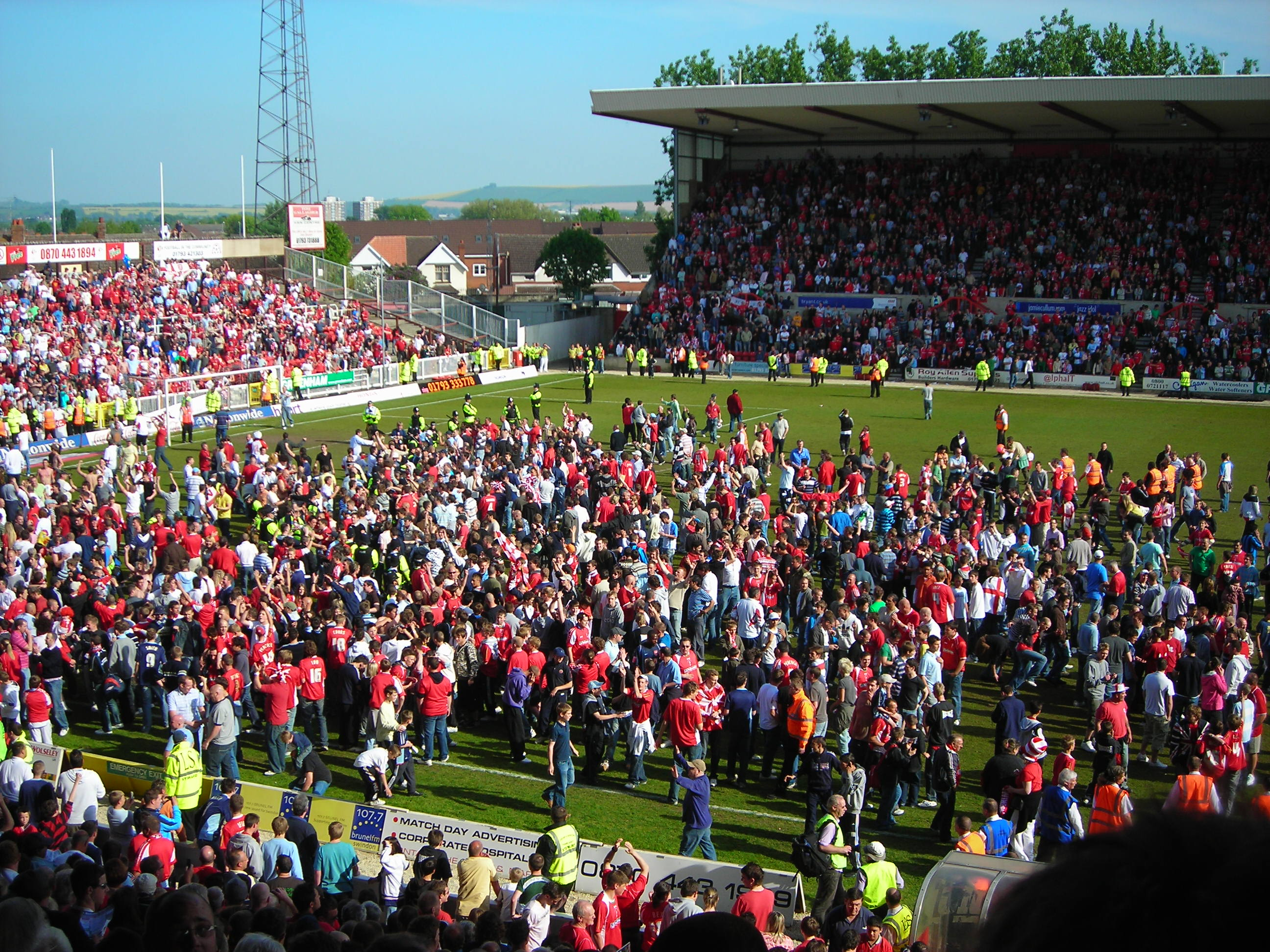
Town fans celebrating promotion on the county ground pitch after the draw with Walsall 2006–07 season

Dennis Wise agreed to become the new Swindon manager in May 2006 following the relegation, with Gus Poyet joining the coaching staff. After a good start to the season, the pair moved to Leeds United in October. Veteran defender Ady Williams and Barry Hunter took temporary charge until Paul Sturrock was appointed on 7 November. Sturrock guided Swindon to promotion back to EFL League One in his first season with the club, earning the third automatic promotion place in a 1–1 draw with Walsall in the last game of the 2006–07 season.

In 2008, Swindon Town was taken over by a consortium, fronted by local businessman Andrew Fitton, with plans to clear all club debts by the end of the 2007–08 season.

Paul Sturrock having departed for Plymouth Argyle, the consortium appointed Sturrock-recommended Maurice Malpas manager, and Swindon finished their first season back in League One in 13th, helped by 15-goal signing Simon Cox. However, the 2008–09 campaign started badly and Malpas was sacked on 14 November 2008, with David Byrne taking over temporarily. Danny Wilson was unveiled as the new manager on 26 December 2008. Wilson helped maintain Swindon's League One status and finished in 15th position, though only four points from the relegation zone, in his first season in charge.

The 2009–10 season would prove a vast improvement, despite the sale of League One top-scorer Simon Cox. The club maintained a play-off position going into the new year, and were at one point in second place with automatic promotion in their own hands. However, a slight slip in form towards the end of the season saw Swindon finish fifth, entering the play-offs against Charlton Athletic. Swindon won the tie on penalties and went on to play in the EFL League One play-offs final against Millwall at Wembley Stadium for a place in the EFL Championship. However, they lost 1–0 in what was their first defeat in four appearances at Wembley.

After losing the final Swindon lost their top scorer Billy Paynter who joined Leeds United on a free transfer, and sold club captain Gordon Greer. Still, many bookmakers had Swindon as one of the favourites for promotion to the Championship going into the 2010–11 season. Inconsistent form left Swindon in mid-table for much of the season; however, a 4–2 win at Charlton Athletic in January left fans hoping for a late-season surge. Instead, top-scorer Charlie Austin was sold to Burnley and the team did not win again for 19 matches. When Danny Wilson resigned on 2 March, Paul Hart was brought in but failed to save the Robins, and on 25 April 2011 Swindon were relegated to League Two yet again after losing 3–1 to Sheffield Wednesday. Paul Hart was replaced for the last two games of the season by former player and current reserve and youth team coach Paul Bodin.

Chart of yearly table positions of Swindon Town in the League.

Soon after the season ended, the board revealed that high-profile former player Paolo Di Canio would take his first management position at the club. After losing seven of his first 13 games in charge, Swindon went on a 15-match unbeaten run which put them into promotion contention by the midpoint of the 2011–12 season. After a defeat on Boxing Day 2011 to Torquay United, Swindon broke a club record by winning 10 consecutive league games, and by March they were well clear of the chasing pack at the top of League Two. They also enjoyed success in both the FA Cup, beating Premiership side Wigan Athletic in the third round before losing to Championship side Leicester City in the fourth round, and the Football League Trophy, reaching the final at Wembley, where they were runners-up to League One side Chesterfield. On 28 April 2012, Swindon, already promoted, guaranteed their championship of League Two on 28 April after a 5–0 drubbing of Port Vale at the County Ground.

On 18 February 2013, with Swindon riding high in League One and in contention for a second consecutive promotion, Di Canio announced his resignation, alleging mistreatment by the board of directors, including the sale of Matt Ritchie behind his back, and the financial instability of the club at the time. In his place came Kevin MacDonald who had previously held caretaker roles at Leicester City and Aston Villa. MacDonald guided Swindon to the League One play-offs; however, they were knocked out after a penalty shoot-out defeat to Brentford. On 13 July 2013, MacDonald left Swindon Town by mutual consent, only three weeks before the start of the 2013–14 season and only five months after taking the Swindon job.

In the 2014–15 season, Swindon reached the League One Play-off final again where they lost 4–0 to Preston after a season in which they were competing for automatic promotion. They went top of the league after a 3–0 win away to Coventry; however, a 2–0 defeat to Sheffield United was the first of a series of results that saw Swindon's form dip, and a 1–0 defeat to bottom club Yeovil Town meant that Swindon were consigned to finish in the play-offs. They reached Wembley after a record-breaking 5–5 draw (winning 7–6 on aggregate) against Sheffield United, the highest-scoring EFL play-off match in history.

In the 2016–17 season, Swindon were relegated to League Two for a third time; they finished third from bottom on 22 April 2017 after losing 2–1 to Scunthorpe United with only one more fixture on the road in hand. Following this relegation, manager Luke Williams was sacked after Swindon lost 3–0 at Charlton Athletic.

=== 2020–present ===
On 9 June 2020, Swindon were crowned League Two champions on the basis of average points per game, matches in the 2019–20 season having been suspended from March due to the COVID-19 pandemic in the United Kingdom. However, in the following season, the pandemic created financial difficulties for the club, with the chairman, Lee Power, warning in February 2021 of potential bankruptcy, and then, in April 2021, being charged with breaching FA regulations concerning the club's ownership and/or funding. On 18 April, manager John Sheridan resigned after winning just eight of 33 matches, with the club seven points from safety with four matches to play. The club's relegation to League Two was confirmed following a 5–0 defeat by MK Dons on 24 April 2021.

On 26 May 2021, John McGreal was appointed Swindon manager but, on 25 June 2021, after less than a month in the job, he left Swindon by mutual consent, citing ownership uncertainty which was preventing him signing new players. Chief executive Steve Anderson also left the club on the same day, followed by director of football Paul Jewell. Swindon supporter groups urged fans to boycott games until the ownership problems were resolved, with High Court hearings due to start on 6 September 2021. On 30 June 2021, the Official Supporters Club was told that a deal to transfer ownership to Australian businessman Clem Morfuni's Axis group would be completed "in the next couple of weeks", though the club later complained that the Axis group was delaying payment.

In early July 2021, it emerged that players and staff had not received their June wages, and that the County Ground's owner, Swindon Borough Council, was taking legal action after receiving no rent since April 2020. The EFL described the ownership wrangle as "concerning" and imposed a transfer embargo on the club. In pre-season friendlies at Melksham Town and Hungerford Town, Swindon fielded sides featuring just a few experienced first-team players, with the rest of the squads being composed of youngsters and trialists. The club then cancelled its planned pre-season friendly with Swansea City at the County Ground on 17 July 2021, citing "ongoing logistical and operational issues". On 15 July 2021, it was reported that the club had paid 60% of the outstanding wages due in June. On 21 July 2021, it was reported that Power had transferred ownership of his shares in the club, and that the EFL had granted Morfuni consent to acquire additional shares, having passed its owners' and directors' test. Morfuni appointed Ben Garner as head coach, Ben Chorley as director of football and Rob Angus (a former Nationwide director) as CEO and, on 26 July 2021, the new management announced their first signing: Ben Gladwin returned for a fourth Swindon spell. On 16 September 2021, Swindon Town was given a suspended three-point deduction by the EFL, relating to the non-payment of player wages in June.

Garner led Swindon to a sixth-place finish in the 2021–22 season with the club beaten on penalties by Port Vale in the play-off semi-finals. Garner joined Charlton Athletic in June 2022, being replaced by Scott Lindsey, who spent half a season in the role before moving to Crawley Town. On 31 January 2023, Jody Morris became manager; he was sacked on 1 May 2023 after just four wins from 18 games. The side finished the season in 10th place. On 8 May 2023, Michael Flynn was appointed team manager on a two-year contract. Rob Angus stood down as CEO in September 2023. In January 2024, a 2–1 defeat at Crewe meant Swindon had lost ten of their last 15 matches, and Flynn was sacked as manager after just over eight months in charge. Appointed caretaker manager to the end of the season, Gavin Gunning questioned his players' "heart" after they won just two of ten games and dropped to 18th place. Ultimately, the club finished the 2023–2024 season in 19th place and Swindon supporters called for a change in the club's ownership. Morfuni acknowledged the season had not been "up to our club's standards".

The side improved to finish 12th at the end of the 2024–25 season. It started with Mark Kennedy as manager, but he lasted just five months being sacked on 25 October 2024. With the club in 22nd place, Ian Holloway took over and, after earning 36 points from 24 matches, was rewarded in March 2025 with a new long-term contract through to June 2028.

== Kit and badge ==
=== Crest ===
The 1970 "steam train" crest

The "traffic sign" badge used from the mid-1970s until 1986

The three designs which were voted on by supporters in 2007

Swindon Town have used at least five different kit badges since their inception. The original badge depicted a robin inside a shield with the letters STFC in the four corners, this changed to the "steam train" badge which was a coat of arms for the club based heavily on the coat of arms used by the local council. The "steam train" badge was in the form of a traditional shield, bisected with the club's name, a GWR steam locomotive (as Swindon is a railway town), a football and with a robin sitting on top. Beneath the shield was a motto on a scroll – "Salubritas et Industria" – meaning "health and industry". This motto is also that of the town of Swindon itself.

During the 1970s the club changed the badge to one referred to as the "ST arrow" or "traffic sign" badge. This was circular and had the letters S and T interlocked, which both ends of the letter S being made into an arrow. Also shown was a simple football and the club name.

Following the 1985–86 season, the "steam train" badge was re-introduced onto the kits. The crest was re-styled and the text "Division Four Champions 1985/1986" replaced the motto.

A diamond shaped crest for Swindon Town was introduced at the beginning of the 1991–92 season following a series of financial problems for the club. The idea behind the new crest was to give the club a new fresh image.

The "diamond" crest unveiled in 1991

"The 'travelling' football represents the club that is looking to the future with successful progress. The diamond shape clearly has the letter S (for Swindon) running through it, while a green section was also introduced to match a new 'green trim' on the team's home (red and white) shirts."

On 5 April 2007, the club unveiled plans to change the badge, claiming the diamond badge was correct for the time, but did not represent or show any of the club's heritage or history. Swindon offered fans the chance to vote on-line for the three new choices, which were all similar to the original steam train design, and a fourth option of keeping the 1991 design.

On 23 April 2007, it was announced that option three of the logo vote was the winner of the poll (it can be seen on the far right of the picture). Winning the vote with 68% in favour, the new badge includes the club name, a robin, a GWR steam locomotive – the rail industry being an important part of the Town's heritage – a football, and re-introduces the town's motto – 'Salubritas et Industria'. It has been in use since the beginning of the 2007–08 season.

Original home kit from 1879/80–1893/94
1894/95–1896/97 home kit
1897/98–1900/01 home kit
1901/02 home kit
1902/03 home kit

=== Home kit ===
Originally playing in black and white with the addition of blue sash for away games, the club changed to black and red quarters on entry to the Southern League in 1894. The club changed again in 1897 with the Swindon Advertiser reporting:

"The new colours of the Swindon Town F.C. are to be green shirts, with white sleeves. Good-bye to the old well known red and black."

With problems obtaining green dyes, the kit was short-lived and Swindon Town changed their shirts to the more familiar red in 1901. Initially a dark maroon, a lighter shade was chosen for the start of the 1902–03 season and also resulted in the club's nickname "the Robins" appearing in print for the first time in programme notes for the first game. The nickname is a reference to the former name of the European robin – "redbreast".

Swindon Town have played their home games in variations on the red and white theme since then, wearing a red shirt with white collars and white or red shorts for much of their history which has led to the team being known as the "Red and White Army". For example; the kit worn during the 1985–86 Division Four Champions season consisted of a red shirt with white pinstripes, white shorts and red socks and chants of "Lou Macari's Red and White Army" were heard from the supporters at the final stages of the season.

Following the rebranding of the club in 1991, green elements were re-introduced onto the home strip and badge to represent the team's short-lived kit from the turn of the century. These were removed in 2007.

=== Away kit ===
The club's away kits have only begun to change since the 1990s and the advent of the lucrative replica kit market. Swindon's first away kit (that was entirely separate to the home kit) consisted of an all-blue strip; this was not used for the club's 1969 League Cup Final victory where they elected to wear an all-white strip.

For a period in the 1980s the club changed their away kit to white shirts and black shorts and introduced a new third kit of yellow shirts and blue shorts. The club alternated between these two schemes as its away kit for the 1980s.

When the club re-branded in the 1991 close season, it introduced a new away strip: the white and green "potato print" shirt with dark blue shorts. This remained in use until its replacement in 1993 with another yellow and blue strip, integrating the new colour scheme by adding a green collar.

A special third kit was added for the 1996–97 season and was coloured "petrol green" in honour of sponsors Castrol.

Swindon wore black and gold striped away shirts for the 2003–04 season with an all-white third kit, following this with variants on the blue theme until returning to all-white in 2007.

In 2008–09 they returned to the dark blue away kit that was used previously for the 2006–07 season but this time they had white shorts instead of a whole dark blue strip. In 2009–10 they returned once again to the all-white kit, but unlike the home kit, which showed FourFourTwo on the front, this showed FIFA10 on the front as a part of sponsorship with EA. They also this year had an all-blue third kit which was featured for the FA Cup and also the play-off away game to Charlton.

In 2010–11 they had an all-black third kit. The all-black kit became the club's away kit for the 2011–12 season with an all-white kit as a third kit used for the FA Cup run. This kit caused controversy among some fans, because it had the sponsors The People printed on the shirts.

For 2012–13 they had a blue and yellow away kit, again controversial as these are the colours of Swindon's close rivals Oxford United.

For the 2021–22 season, they released a checkered gold and green kit. The colours of the Australia national team, paying homage to the new Australian owner Clem Morfuni. Later in the season they also released a special all black third kit. This included a darkened club badge, intended to signify the club coming "out of the darkness" following the take over of the new owner.

=== Shirt sponsors ===
The current manufacturer is Adidas, restarting in 2024. From 2015 - 2024 Swindon's kit had been manufactured by Puma. Previous manufacturers include Umbro, Admiral, Adidas, Coffer Sports, Spall, Diamond Leisure, Loki, Mizuno, Lotto, Xara, DGI, Strikeforce, and Lonsdale. The club's shirt sponsors have included ISIS, Lowndes Lambert Group, GWR FM, Burmah, Castrol, Nationwide, Kingswood Group, FourFourTwo, Samsung, EA Sports FIFA, C&D, Imagine Cruising, Bartercard, First City Nursing & Care and MiPermit.

== Stadium ==
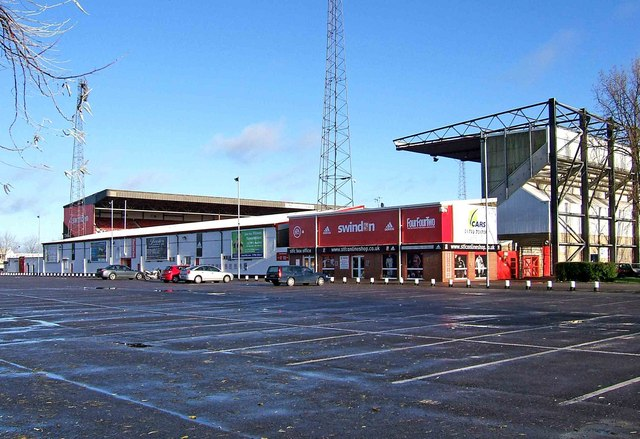
The County Ground, taken from the Town End.

Swindon Town's original pitch was located south of Bath Road, in the region of Bradford Road, adjacent to the Okus Quarry. After a young spectator fell into the quarry the team decided to move first to Lansdown Road and then to a pitch near The Croft where they were to remain for the next 11 years.

Swindon Town have been playing at the County Ground since 1896. They played their games on the site of the adjacent cricket pitch also called the County Ground from 1893 until the ground opened.

Thomas Arkell of Arkell's Brewery donated £300 to finance the construction of a stand on what was then known as the 'Wiltshire County Ground', this investment was enough to begin development of a purpose-built football ground. Since its original construction, the ground has been periodically updated with new features or fittings. A cover on the Shrivenham Road side was erected in 1932, followed by the current roof at the Town End. This cost £4,300, which was raised by the Supporters' Club, and was opened on 27 August 1938 by local MP, W.W. Wakefield.

The War Department took over the ground in 1940, where for a while POWs were housed in huts placed on the pitch. For this the club received compensation of £4,570 in 1945.

The addition of floodlights in 1951 at a cost of £350, gave Swindon the honour of being the first League club to do so. These were first tried out v. Bristol City on 2 April 1951 beating Arsenal by six months. These original set of lights were supplemented by lights on both side stand roofs, which were sufficient for the County Ground to stage its first floodlit league match on 29 February 1956 v. Millwall. (seven days after Fratton Park became the first ground to stage a floodlit league fixture). The present pylons date from 1960.

The ground currently contains elements constructed between 1950 and 1995, with the latest addition being the large sponsored stand on the south side. The County Ground is also the only football stadium in the world with a Rolex watch acting as its timekeeper, the clock on the Stratton Bank stand featuring its name was erected to celebrate promotion in 1963.

The ground itself was on land owned by Swindon Borough Council to which the club pays rent. Swindon had in the past considered a move to a club owned stadium to generate more revenue, but did not have the financial backing to do so. In 2006 a redevelopment campaign for the County Ground began, with the club and TrustSTFC (the supporters' trust) raising a petition to 'Save Our Home' urging the Borough Council to "facilitate the redevelopment of the stadium and do everything they can to keep the club within the Borough" including the proposed upgrading of the adjacent Cricket Club to County standard and Athletic Club to Olympic standard.

On 24 March 2023, Swindon Town bought the County Ground for £2.3 million, as part of a joint venture with TrustSTFC, giving fans the opportunity to own a percentage of the Ground.

== Supporters ==
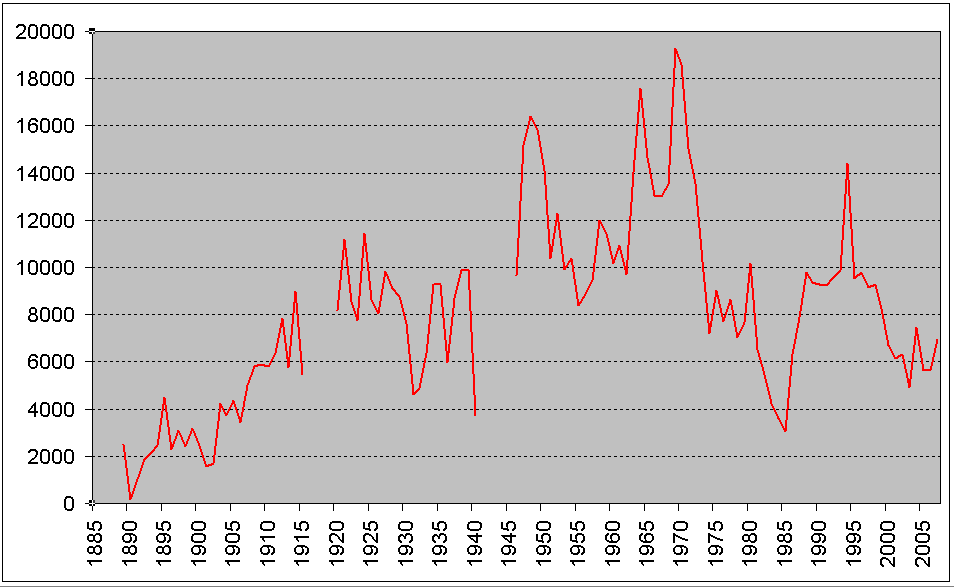
Average home attendances since 1889. In more recent years, attendances have gone up, giving Swindon Town one of the highest attendances in League One

As an expanding railway town, the club had attendances of up to 32,000 on match days until the early 1970s. Due to Swindon's low unemployment rate (one of the lowest in the United Kingdom), more people work in the town than live there and so are unlikely to support the team. In addition; poor team performances, the financial instability in the club and the change to an all-seated stadium following the Taylor Report have led to attendances at the County Ground dropping.

With an all-seated capacity of 15,728 at the County Ground, Swindon averaged a home attendance of 5,839 for the 2004–05 season. Only 37% of the grounds seats were occupied at a game on average. This rose to 5,950 (37.8%) in 2005–06 and was reported as 7,109 (45.2%) for the 2006–07 season.

A core group of fans has inhabited the Town End of the stadium since the 1980s, producing past fanzines such as The 69'er, Bring the Noise, Randy Robin and The Magic Roundabout amongst others. Supporters call the team The Town, The Reds, STFC and also the Red and White Army, the latter being a term the supporters use to identify themselves as well. The Junior Robins is the children's supporters club which operates to provide lower ticket prices, away game activities and transport to young fans. Membership of the club also allows them to be nominated as game mascot and gives them the opportunity to train in one of the many Football Schools run by the club.

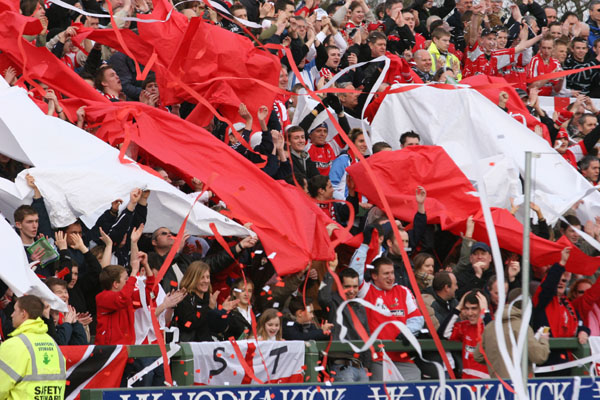
Swindon Town supporters with banners provided by Red Army Loud and Proud

The supporters' trust, TrustSTFC, was established in 2000. This organisation is a democratically elected group of fans who raise funds for the club and aim to give supporters access and input into decisions made by the club's board. The group run a number of schemes including the Loan Note Scheme, the aim of which is to buy shares in the club and assist with investment. Another scheme is the Red Army Fund; the money raised by this fund is given to the club to contribute towards the purchase and wages of new players. TrustSTFC also take part in the Fans' Consortium, which aims to place a supporter with a large stake-holding in the club onto the board of directors. The trust is also currently campaigning with the club for the re-development of the County Ground.

The Football Fever Report published by statisticians of the Littlewoods Football Pools was released in January 2007. It researched those teams that were the most stressful to support. Swindon Town was placed fifth out of all 92 League clubs, with the report stating –

"It's only just over a decade ago that Swindon were a Premier League side, but the past 10 years have been tough going for fans at the County Ground. Relegation from the top flight in 1994 was followed by a second successive drop, and although promotion from Division Two was secured a year later, the team struggled in Division One in the next three seasons, finishing 19th, 18th and 17th. In 2000 came relegation, and a year later Swindon avoided another 'double relegation' by just one point. A glimmer of hope came when the play-offs were reached in 2004 – ending in a semi-final loss to Brighton – but last term Town became the first club to drop into the bottom tier of the Football League having once been in the Premier League. We bet Robins' fans can hardly believe it."

With the dwindling support during matches in the 2004–05 season, another fans' group, Red Army Loud and Proud was formed. It is a small group of fans attempting to bring back the atmosphere and fun to match days. With the stated aim of being "the 12th man on the pitch", the group sponsors players and also provides large colourful flags to the matches.

However, in more recent years 2010–11 Swindon has rapidly increasing attendances with an 8,400 average attendance for the 2010–11 season despite relegation.

=== Hooliganism ===
Swindon Town has had problems with hooliganism since the 1970s, with the first known group being called the Swindon Town Aggro Boys (STAB). In a home game against Wrexham in March 1978, STAB were responsible for pelting the opposing goalkeeper with darts, stones and a golf ball. Club chairman Cecil Green later said: "We intend to stamp out this thuggery. The incidents were diabolical." A new hooligan gang emerged in the 1980s, the Swindon Southside Firm (SSF), who were named after the area of terracing they occupied. In a match at Northampton Town, then manager Lou Macari walked straight into a group of more than 100 SSF members chasing Northampton fans up the street. Macari said the incident was "worse than a Celtic–Rangers game".

In the 1990s, the Swindon Active Service (SAS) came to prominence and it is believed they were at the centre of several hostilities with fans of local rivals Oxford United and Reading. In September 1998, 19 SAS members were arrested at the home match with Oxford. A fracas at an away game versus AFC Bournemouth on 18 December 2004 resulted in the arrest of seventeen and the imposition of banning orders on those found to be guilty. The fighting, involving more than forty supporters, occurred in a busy shopping centre before the game. "District Judge Roger House said it had been a 'frightening and terrifying' experience for scores of Christmas shoppers who witnessed the scenes." The Swindon Advertiser reported that "The area was packed with Christmas shoppers, who watched in horror as pub windows were smashed and fans traded insults."

On 16 December 2006, Swindon recorded one of their highest attendances of the season: 10,010 at a home win against rivals Bristol Rovers. The game was marred by supporter trouble which resulted in 11 arrests and saw an area of seating in the Arkell's Stand damaged, with the Western Daily Press reporting that "the incident [...] ended with damage to 60 seats after they were used as missiles between opposing fans". On the day of the return game in Bristol, 20 Rovers fans attacked a number of Swindon supporters with baseball bats at a local pub.

Nick Lowles, author of Hooligans 2: The M–Z of Britain's Football Hooligan Gangs, said: "If you look at Swindon, the police have been very proactive in the last five years in terms of stopping hooliganism".

Swindon Town has imposed banning orders on those supporters who cause disruption, criminal damage or are violent when attending games. There were 29 banning orders in place in 2006, which was an increase from a total of 11 in 2005. The increase in banning orders has resulted in a reduction of arrests at games, with only 22 people being arrested attending games in 2005–06 compared to 39 arrests in 2004–05. Of the 22 arrests in 2005–06; 11 were for Public Disorder, five for violent disorder and the rest were made up of offences relating to missile throwing, racist chanting, pitch invasion, alcohol-related offences and one incident of being in possession of an offensive weapon. 33 Swindon fans were also banned from travelling to the 2006 FIFA World Cup. In 2013, 10 Swindon fans were charged with violent disorder following an incident outside the Royal Oak pub in Brentford before the club's League 1 play-off semi-final defeat.

On 23 November 2013 a Swindon fan was arrested after running onto the pitch and punching Leyton Orient's goalkeeper, Jamie Jones.

On 10 October 2023, Swindon Town met rivals Reading in an EFL Trophy game for their first competitive fixture in over 21 years. After the game, fighting broke out between the two sets of fans, leading to four arrests by the Thames Valley Police.

=== Rivalries ===
Many clubs share either minor or more major rivalries with Swindon. In 2013 a poll of supporters of all Football League clubs to find out which teams they see as their main rivals was conducted by the Football Fans Census, the results of which put Swindon in joint 4th place on the list of teams with the most rivals. This result was calculated by ranking clubs on how many supporters of other clubs viewed others as first, second, and third rivals.

Swindon Town's fiercest rivals are Oxford United, with whom they contest the A420 derby. This bitterly contested fixture has been marred with controversial and violent events both on and off the pitch over the years and the hatred has also been known to extend to other sports including speedway, with both riders and fans getting into regular scuffles over the years. As of 2025 the sides have met 62 times in all competitions, with Swindon winning 25, Oxford winning 17, and 20 games ending in a draw. Swindon Town fans are referred to by their rivals as "moonrakers", though in Wiltshire this isn't seen as an insult.

Reading are also seen by many Swindon fans as a major rival, however this rivalry has become less intense over the years with both teams being in different divisions and not playing each other for a period of over 21 years. The rivalries between Swindon, Reading, and Oxford were labelled as the "Didcot Triangle" (owing to the train station which lies at the centre of the 3 locations) when the sides shared the same division in 2001, however the rivalry between Swindon Town and Oxford United is generally regarded as being by far the most intense, with both teams fans viewing each other as main rivals in the most recent polls. This is because Swindon and Oxford have spent most of their history in higher divisions than Reading, and recently in lower divisions than Reading, and Reading's traditional biggest rivalry is with Aldershot.

Additionally, Swindon share historical rivalries with Bristol City and Bristol Rovers. The rivalry with Bristol City was most recently relevant in the 2014/15 season where both clubs were fighting for promotion to the Championship, with former Swindon defender Aden Flint causing outrage via an interview conducted after Bristol City's decisive 3-0 win over Swindon at Ashton Gate in the closing part of the season. Swindon last shared a division with Bristol Rovers in the 2021/22 season, with Swindon playing under Bristol Rovers' former manager Ben Garner. The rivalries with the Bristol clubs tend to be felt more strongly by people in areas of West Wiltshire, where the catchment for the club's fanbases overlaps.

Other more minor rivalries exist with multiple clubs, the most notable of which being with Gillingham. This rivalry stems from an ill tempered match in the 1978/79 season where both teams were vying for promotion from the old Third Division, during which the referee was assaulted by a fan, multiple players ended up in court after a fight in the tunnel, and fan violence erupted on the terraces. Newport County have also emerged as a minor rivalry during Swindon's recent stay in League 2, with occasional trouble occurring whenever the two teams meet. Gloucestershire teams Cheltenham Town and Forest Green Rovers also consider Swindon a local rival, however this is not very often reciprocated as strongly by Swindon fans, due to the clubs not historically playing competitively at the same level. Other West Country clubs including Plymouth Argyle and Exeter City have also been labelled as derbies by fans and the media.

== Swindon Town Women F.C. ==
Swindon Town Ladies FC were established on 28 September 1993, after breaking away from the established Swindon Spitfires Women's and Girls' Football Club, while they rebranded to Swindon Town Women in July 2019. The current Swindon Town Women Football Club (STWFC) first team play in the FA Women's National League South West Division 1. Swindon Town Women currently play their home games at Foundation Park and the County Ground. In April 2023 the club officially came under the main Club umbrella with their first actions to replace the management team of the First and Development sides, while folding their U18s.

== Players ==
=== First team squad ===
As of 1 September 2026.

Note: Flags indicate national team as defined under FIFA eligibility rules; some limited exceptions apply. Players may hold more than one non-FIFA nationality.

No.	Pos.	Nation	Player
1	GK	ENG	Connor Ripley
2	DF	WAL	Mitch Clark
4	MF	IRL	Gavin Kilkenny
5	DF	MDA	Stephan Negru
6	MF	ENG	James Ball
7	FW	ENG	Tom Nichols
8	MF	ENG	Ollie Clarke (captain)
9	FW	GER	Paul Glatzel
10	FW	ENG	Harry Smith
11	FW	ENG	Fletcher Holman
12	GK	ENG	Lewis Ward
14	MF	ENG	Danny Butterworth
15	MF	ENG	Joseph Hungbo (on loan from Wigan Athletic)
16	DF	NIR	Sam Inwood (on loan from Bolton Wanderers)
17	DF	ENG	Ryan Tafazolli
18	DF	ENG	James Debayo (on loan from Hull City)

No.	Pos.	Nation	Player
19	MF	ENG	Joe Snowdon
20	MF	ENG	Ben Middlemas
21	DF	AUS	Kaelan Majekodunmi
22	MF	AUS	Jaylan Pearman (on loan from Queens Park Rangers)
23	FW	IRL	Aaron Drinan
24	MF	ENG	Matty Virtue
25	MF	SCO	Jack Thomson
26	DF	ENG	Dan Butler (on loan from Stevenage)
27	MF	ENG	Anthony Munda (on loan from Newcastle United)
28	FW	ENG	Ollie Palmer
29	FW	ENG	Antwoine Hackford
33	DF	ENG	Joel McGregor
34	DF	ENG	Billy Kirkman
37	GK	ENG	Charlie Summers
38	DF	ENG	Lucas Griffiths-Brown
39	FW	ENG	Louis Millard

For recent transfers, see 2026–27 Swindon Town F.C. season.

=== Out on loan ===
Note: Flags indicate national team as defined under FIFA eligibility rules; some limited exceptions apply. Players may hold more than one non-FIFA nationality.

No.	Pos.	Nation	Player
—	DF	COD	Filozofe Mabete (at Forest Green Rovers until 2nd January 2027)
—	DF	ENG	Sonny Hart (at Enfield Town)

=== Reserves and Academy ===
For further information: Swindon Town F.C. Reserves and Academy Note: Flags indicate national team as defined under FIFA eligibility rules; some limited exceptions apply. Players may hold more than one non-FIFA nationality.

No.	Pos.	Nation	Player
42	MF	ENG	Josh Terry
43	MF	ENG	Freddie Hoare

No.	Pos.	Nation	Player
44	MF	ENG	Rory Da Costa
45	MF	ENG	Jacob Hagan

=== Out on loan ===
Note: Flags indicate national team as defined under FIFA eligibility rules; some limited exceptions apply. Players may hold more than one non-FIFA nationality.

No.	Pos.	Nation	Player

== Club management ==
=== Club officials ===
As of 9 July 2024.

Position	Name
Chairman	(Australia) Clem Morfuni
"Person of Significant Interest"	(England) Christopher Kiely
"Person of Significant Interest"	(England) Hollie Kiely
Chief Executive	(England) Anthony Hall
Head of Football	
Manager	(England) Ian Holloway
Assistant Manager	(England) Marcus Bignot
First Team Pathways Coach	(Republic of Ireland) Gavin Gunning
Goalkeeping Coach	(England) Steve Mildenhall
First-Team Physio	(England) Jackson Bradley
First-Team Head of Performance	(England) Joseph Headley
First-Team Lead Analyst	(England) Bradley Hardy
Commercial Manager	(Wales) James Watts
Head of Media and Communications	
Official Club Photographer	(England) Callum Knowles
Kit Man	(England) Steve Hooper
Kit Man	(England) Jonah Isaacs
Chief Scout	
Academy Manager	(England) Mark Moss
Assistant Academy Manager	(England) Kirk McGinn
Academy Head of Coaching	(England) David Farrell
Academy Professional Development Phase Coach	(England) Kirk McGinn
Academy Youth Development Phase Coach	(England) Sean Wood
Academy Sports Scientist	(England) Sam Grose
Academy Head of Recruitment	(England) Martin Doyle
Senior Academy Physiotherapist	(England) Ryan Hankins
Club Ambassador	(England) Don Rogers

=== Managerial history ===
As of May 2023, 44 men have been appointed as a manager of Swindon Town Football Club, excluding caretaker managers. Danny Williams and Andy King are the only men to have been given the job on a permanent basis twice.

- (England) Sam Allen 1902–1933
- (Wales) Ted Vizard 1933–1939
- (Scotland) Neil Harris 1939–1940
- (England) Louis Page 1945–1953
- (England) Maurice Lindley 1953–1955
- (England) Bert Head 1956–1965
- (England) Danny Williams 1965–1969
- (England) Fred Ford 1969–1971
- (Scotland) Dave Mackay 1971–1972 (Player-Manager)
- (England) Les Allen 1972–1974
- (England) Danny Williams 1974–1978
- (England) Bobby Smith 1978–1980
- (England) John Trollope 1980–1983
- (England) Ken Beamish 1983–1984
- (Scotland) Lou Macari 1984–1989 (Player-Manager)
- (Argentina) Osvaldo Ardiles 1989–1991 (Player-Manager)
- (Republic of Ireland) Tony Galvin 1991 (Caretaker)
- (England) Glenn Hoddle 1991–1993 (Player-Manager)
- (Scotland) John Gorman 1993–1994
- (England) Andy Rowland 1994 (Caretaker)
- (England) Steve McMahon 1994–1998 (Player-Manager)
- (Republic of Ireland) Mike Walsh 1998 (Caretaker)
- (Northern Ireland) Jimmy Quinn 1998–2000 (Player-Manager)
- (England) Colin Todd 2000
- (England) Andy King 2000–2001
- (England) Roy Evans 2001
- (England) Andy King 2001–2005
- (Scotland) Iffy Onuora 2005–2006
- (England) Dennis Wise 2006
- (England) David Tuttle 2006 (Caretaker)
- (Wales) Ady Williams 2006 (Caretaker)
- (Scotland) Paul Sturrock 2006–2007
- (England) David Byrne 2007–2008 (Caretaker)
- (Scotland) Maurice Malpas 2008
- (England) David Byrne 2008 (Caretaker)
- (Northern Ireland) Danny Wilson 2008–2011
- (England) Paul Hart 2011
- (Wales) Paul Bodin 2011 (Caretaker)
- (Italy) Paolo Di Canio 2011–2013
- (Italy) Fabrizio Piccareta 2013 (Caretaker)
- (England) Tommy Miller & Darren Ward 2013 (Joint Player-Caretakers)
- (Scotland) Kevin MacDonald 2013
- (England) Mark Cooper 2013–2015
- (Republic of Ireland) Lee Power 2015 (Caretaker)
- (England) Martin Ling 2015
- (England) Luke Williams 2015–2017
- (England) David Flitcroft 2017–2018
- (England) Matt Taylor 2018 (Player-Caretaker)
- (England) Phil Brown 2018
- (England) Richie Wellens 2018–2020
- (Republic of Ireland) Noel Hunt 2020 (Caretaker)
- (Republic of Ireland) John Sheridan 2020–2021
- (Scotland) Tommy Wright 2021 (Caretaker)
- (England) John McGreal 2021
- (England) Ben Garner 2021–2022
- (England) Scott Lindsey 2022–2023
- (Republic of Ireland) Gavin Gunning & (England) Steve Mildenhall 2023 (Joint-Caretaker)
- (England) Jody Morris 2023
- (Republic of Ireland) Gavin Gunning & (England) Steve Mildenhall 2023 (Joint-Caretaker)
- (Wales) Michael Flynn 2023–2024
- (Republic of Ireland) Gavin Gunning 2024 (Caretaker)
- (Republic of Ireland) Mark Kennedy 2024
- (England) Ian Holloway 2024–

== Player awards and recognition ==
=== Swindon Town Hall of Fame (as of 14 July 2023) ===
On 15 December 2011, local newspaper the Swindon Advertiser announced that the club were to launch the Swindon Town Hall of Fame. Former players Don Rogers, John Trollope and Paul Bodin were the first three confirmed inductees with the others announced during a BBC Wiltshire radio broadcast on 30 December 2011.

=== Hall of Fame (in alphabetical order) ===
- (Wales) Paul Bodin (inducted 2011)
- (England) Don Rogers (inducted 2011)
- (England) John Trollope (inducted 2011)

=== English Football Hall of Fame ===
The following have either played for or managed Swindon Town and have been inducted into the English Football Hall of Fame

- Players
- (England) Herbert Chapman
- (England) Mike Summerbee
- Managers
- (Scotland) Dave Mackay
- (England) Glenn Hoddle
- (Argentina) Ossie Ardiles

== Statistics and records ==
John Trollope holds the record for Swindon Town appearances, having played 889 first-team matches between 1960 and 1980. Trollope also holds the English Football League Record of most appearances by a player at one club, having played in 770 League games. Central defender Maurice Owen comes second, having played 601 times. The record for a goalkeeper is held by Sam Burton, who is third with 509 appearances.

Harry Morris holds all of Swindon's goal records, having scored 229 goals for the club between 1926 and 1933. Harold Fleming is second with 203, with Don Rogers third with 178. Morris scored the most goals in a season with 48 during 1926–27, 47 of which were in League games which is another club record. The most goals scored by an individual is also held by Morris and Keith East, who have both scored 5 against League opposition (Morris having achieved this in 1926 and 1930).

The highest attendance at the County Ground of 32,000 was recorded on 15 January 1972 in a FA Cup third round match against Arsenal. The capacity of the ground is now 15,728 so it is unlikely that this record will be broken in the foreseeable future.

Swindon Town have also set records in English football, being the second team (after York City in 1983–84) to score over 100 points in the League when they became Fourth Division champions in 1985–86. The total of 102 that the club scored has since been beaten. They also hold the Premier League record for most goals conceded in a season, 100 in 1993–94, though several teams have finished with a lower points tally.

On 20 February 2007 the club played in a landmark League game away to Barnet, a 1–0 loss. The completion of this match meant that Swindon had, during their history, played a League game at home and away against every team who, in the 2006–07 season, 2011–12 season and 2019–20 season, were in the Premier League, Championship, League One and League Two but not the National League.

== Honours ==
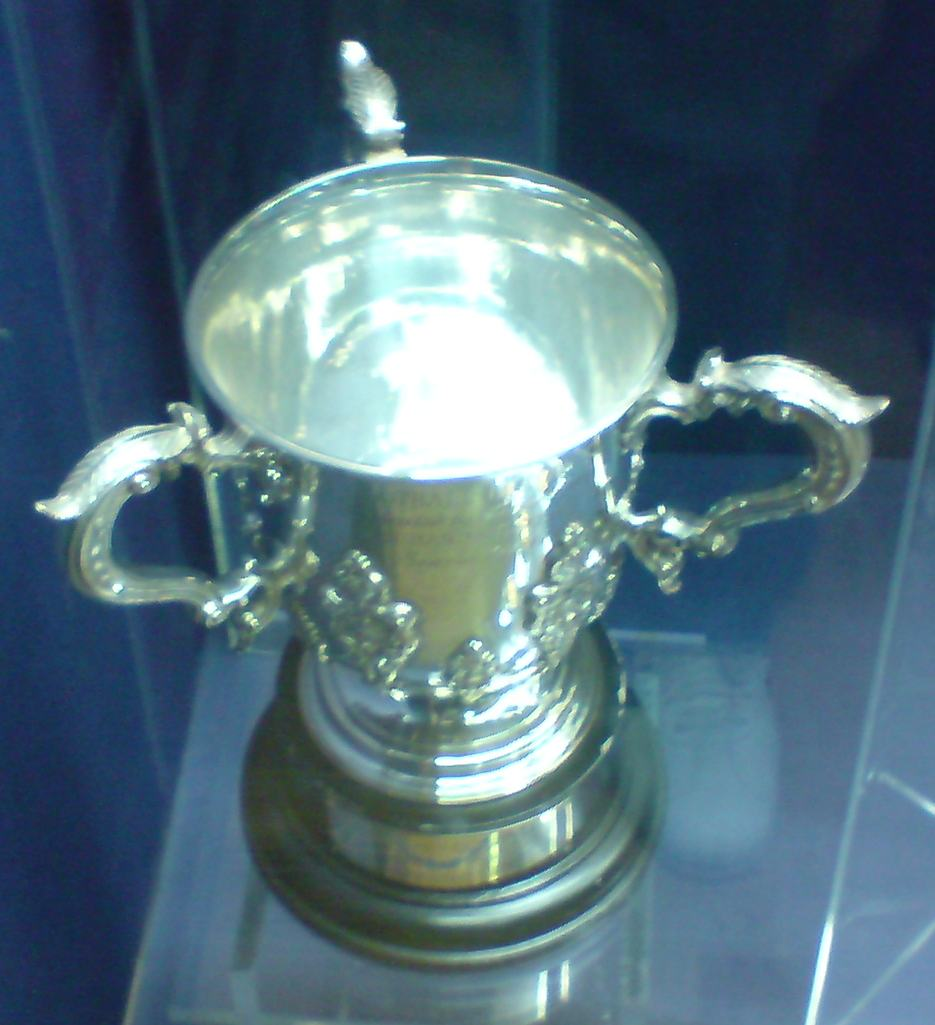
Swindon won the League Cup in 1969.

League

- Second Division / First Division (level 2)
  - Play-off winners: 1990, 1993
- Third Division / Second Division (level 3)
  - Champions: 1995–96
  - Runners-up: 1962–63, 1968–69
  - Play-off winners: 1987
- Fourth Division / League Two (level 4)
  - Champions: 1985–86, 2011–12, 2019–20
  - Promoted: 2006–07
- Southern League
  - Champions: 1910–11, 1913–14
- Western League
  - Champions: 1898–99

Cup

- League Cup
  - Winners: 1968–69
- Football League Trophy
  - Runners-up: 2011–12
- FA Charity Shield
  - Runners-up: 1911
- Anglo-Italian Cup
  - Winners: 1970
- Anglo-Italian League Cup
  - Winners: 1969
- Wiltshire County FA Senior Cup
  - Winners: 1886–87, 1887–88, 1888–89, 1889–90, 1890–91, 1891–92, 1892–93, 1896–97, 1903–04, 1919–20
- Dubonnet Cup
  - Winners: 1910
