= David Byrne (footballer, born 1961) =

English footballer (born 1961)

Personal information
- Full name: David Stuart Byrne
- Date of birth: 5 March 1961 (age 65)
- Place of birth: Hammersmith, England
- Height: 5 ft 8 in (1.73 m)
- Position: Winger

Youth career
- Brentford

Senior career*
Years	Team	Apps	(Gls)
- Southall
- Hounslow
–1981	Harrow Borough		
1981–1982	Hayes	41	(3)
1982–1983	Hounslow		
1983–1985	Kingstonian		
1985–1986	Gillingham	23	(3)
1986–1988	Millwall	63	(6)
1988	→ Cambridge United (loan)	4	(0)
1989	→ Blackburn Rovers (loan)	4	(0)
1989–1991	Plymouth Argyle	59	(2)
1990	→ Bristol Rovers (loan)	2	(0)
1990–1991	Watford	17	(2)
1991	→ Reading (loan)	7	(2)
1992	→ Fulham (loan)	5	(1)
1992–1993	Shamrock Rovers (loan)	4	(0)
1992–1993	St Johnstone	12	(0)
1993–1995	Partick Thistle	35	(0)
1994	→ Walsall (loan)	5	(0)
1994–1995	St Mirren	6	(0)
1995	Tottenham Hotspur (loan)	0	(0)
1995	Ayr United	10	(0)
1995–1997	Albion Rovers	46	(1)

Managerial career
- Plymouth Argyle (youth team)
- 2006–2007: Swindon Town (youth)
- 2007–2008: Swindon Town (caretaker)
- 2008–2009: Swindon Town (assistant)
- 2008: Swindon Town (caretaker)
- 2015–2016: Yeovil Town (youth)
- * Club domestic league appearances and goals

David Stuart Byrne (born 5 March 1961) is an English former professional footballer who played as a winger. After retiring from the game he went on to be a coach, assistant manager, caretaker manager, director of football and head of recruitment for clubs north and south of the UK, his recent job was head of recruitment at Dundee United but recently left the club.

== Playing career ==
Byrne began his career in non-league football, before moving to Gillingham in July 1985. He moved to Millwall on 4 August 1986 for a fee of £5,000. He joined Cambridge United on loan on 8 September 1988 and Blackburn Rovers on loan on 23 February 1989. On 16 March 1989, he joined Plymouth Argyle on a free transfer. He later played for Bristol Rovers, Watford and went on loan to Reading and Fulham.

Byrne joined Shamrock Rovers in January 1993 also on loan from Watford but only made four league appearances. After returning to Watford he joined Scottish side St Johnstone and Partick Thistle. He joined Walsall on loan in February 1994 and after leaving Partick played for St Mirren, Ayr United and Albion Rovers where he was player-coach in 1996. He also had a brief loan spell at Tottenham Hotspur in 1995, featuring in their makeshift squad for the Intertoto Cup.

== Coaching career ==
Byrne later coached the Plymouth Argyle youth team and was appointed as Director of Football at Plymouth College of Further Education.

In November 2006 Byrne was assisting Ian Atkins on a non-contract basis at Torquay United. On 28 November 2006, he left his post at PCFE when he was named as the new Youth Team Manager at Swindon Town working under former Plymouth Argyle boss Paul Sturrock. After Sturrock left Swindon to take the role of managing his previous club, Plymouth, Byrne took temporary charge of Swindon. When Maurice Malpas became manager, Byrne became his assistant. Byrne again became Caretaker manager of Swindon following the departure of manager Maurice Malpas, on 14 November 2008. Following the news that Danny Wilson was confirmed as the new manager of Swindon Town, on 26 December 2008, Byrne again reverted to being assistant manager. On 16 June 2009, he was appointed Head of Player Development at Swindon Town. He left that post in August 2010.

With the restarting of Yeovil Town's academy, in July 2015, Byrne was appointed as the new head of coaching and under 18's manager. He left his role in May 2016.

Byrne joined Dundee United as head of recruitment in March 2019. Since then he has left Tannadice with Dundee United in April 2024 appointing former Southampton's Michael Cairney as Byrne old role.
