= Harold Fleming (footballer) =

English footballer (1887–1955)

Personal information
- Full name: Harold John Fleming
- Date of birth: 30 April 1887
- Place of birth: Downton, Wiltshire, England
- Date of death: 23 August 1955 (aged 68)
- Position: Inside forward

Youth career
- St. Marks

Senior career*
| Years | Team | Apps | (Gls) |
| 1907–1924 | Swindon Town | 293 | (183) |

International career
| 1909–1914 | England | 11 | (9) |
- * Club domestic league appearances and goals

Harold John Fleming (30 April 1887 – 23 August 1955) was an English footballer who played as an inside forward for Swindon Town and the England national team. He is the only Swindon Town player to have featured for England.

== Club career ==
Fleming began his career at St. Marks before being invited for a trial at Swindon Town by manager Sam Allen. He joined the club in 1907. Fleming scored a brace in a 4–0 win over Salisbury and was swiftly signed on a full-time basis.

Fleming became a Swindon Town legend scoring 203 times in 332 games in 17 years at the club. If not for World War I his career may have been more successful. He worked as a physical education instructor during the conflict.

During his career, Fleming had a style of football boot named after him.

== International career ==
Fleming remains the only Swindon player to have represented England at senior level while playing for the club - gaining 11 caps between 1909 and 1914.

== Legacy ==
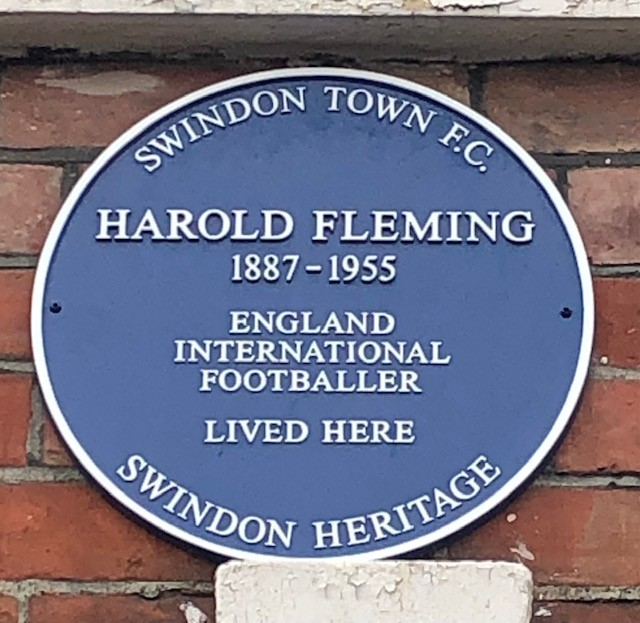
Swindon Heritage Blue Plaque on the house lived in by Harold Fleming in Durham Street, Swindon.

Fleming Way in Swindon, close to the County Ground, is named after him and a statue of him stands inside the foyer of Swindon Town at the County Ground. In 2019 Swindon Heritage unveiled a blue plaque to Fleming on his former home in Durham Street.

Around 2009 video footage of Fleming's playing was discovered.

== Family ==
Harold Fleming was the son of Fredrick Henry Fleming (born 19 May 1850), and had one brother (Fredrick Edwin) and two sisters (Ella and Edith). All four went on to have children, including a daughter (Meriel) for Harold.

== Career statistics ==
=== Club ===
Appearances and goals by club, season and competition
| Club | Season | League | | | FA Cup | | League cup | | Total | |
| Club | Season | Division | Apps | Goals | Apps | Goals | Apps | Goals | Apps | Goals |
|---|---|---|---|---|---|---|---|---|---|---|
| Swindon Town | 1907–08 | | 28 | 17 | 4 | 0 | 0 | 0 | 32 | 17 |
| Swindon Town | 1908–09 | | 34 | 29 | 1 | 0 | 0 | 0 | 35 | 29 |
| Swindon Town | 1909–10 | | 33 | 19 | 5 | 5 | 3 | 1 | 41 | 25 |
| Swindon Town | 1910–11 | | 30 | 19 | 4 | 2 | 2 | 0 | 36 | 21 |
| Swindon Town | 1911–12 | | 20 | 16 | 6 | 5 | 1 | 0 | 27 | 21 |
| Swindon Town | 1912–13 | | 12 | 9 | 2 | 1 | 0 | 0 | 14 | 10 |
| Swindon Town | 1913–14 | | 24 | 18 | 1 | 1 | 0 | 0 | 25 | 19 |
| Swindon Town | 1914–15 | | 23 | 12 | 2 | 0 | 0 | 0 | 25 | 12 |
| Swindon Town | 1919–20 | | 20 | 10 | 2 | 0 | 0 | 0 | 22 | 10 |
| Swindon Town | 1920–21 | | 26 | 16 | 1 | 1 | 0 | 0 | 27 | 17 |
| Swindon Town | 1921–22 | | 24 | 11 | 2 | 2 | 0 | 0 | 26 | 13 |
| Swindon Town | 1922–23 | | 14 | 4 | 1 | 0 | 0 | 0 | 15 | 4 |
| Swindon Town | 1923–24 | | 5 | 3 | 5 | 2 | 0 | 0 | 10 | 5 |
| Career total | | | 293 | 183 | 36 | 19 | 6 | 1 | 335 | 203 |

=== International ===
Scores and results list England's goal tally first, score column indicates score after each Fleming goal.

List of international goals scored by Harold Fleming
| No. | Date | Venue | Opponent | Score | Result | Competition |
|---|---|---|---|---|---|---|
| 1 | 29 May 1909 | Millenáris Sporttelep, Budapest, Hungary | Hungary | 3–0 | 4–2 | Friendly |
| 2 | 31 May 1909 | Millenáris Sporttelep, Budapest, Hungary | Hungary | 1–0 | 8–2 | Friendly |
| 3 | 31 May 1909 | Millenáris Sporttelep, Budapest, Hungary | Hungary | 5–0 | 8–2 | Friendly |
| 4 | 12 February 1910 | Solitude, Belfast, Ireland | Ireland | 1–1 | 1–1 | Friendly |
| 5 | 10 February 1912 | Dalymount Park, Dublin, Ireland | Ireland | 1–0 | 6–1 | Friendly |
| 6 | 10 February 1912 | Dalymount Park, Dublin, Ireland | Ireland | 3–1 | 6–1 | Friendly |
| 7 | 10 February 1912 | Dalymount Park, Dublin, Ireland | Ireland | 5–1 | 6–1 | Friendly |
| 8 | 17 March 1913 | Ashton Gate, Bristol, England | Wales | 1–1 | 4–3 | Friendly |
| 9 | 4 April 1914 | Hampden Park, Glasgow, Scotland | Scotland | 1–1 | 1–3 | Friendly |
