= Dubonnet Cup =

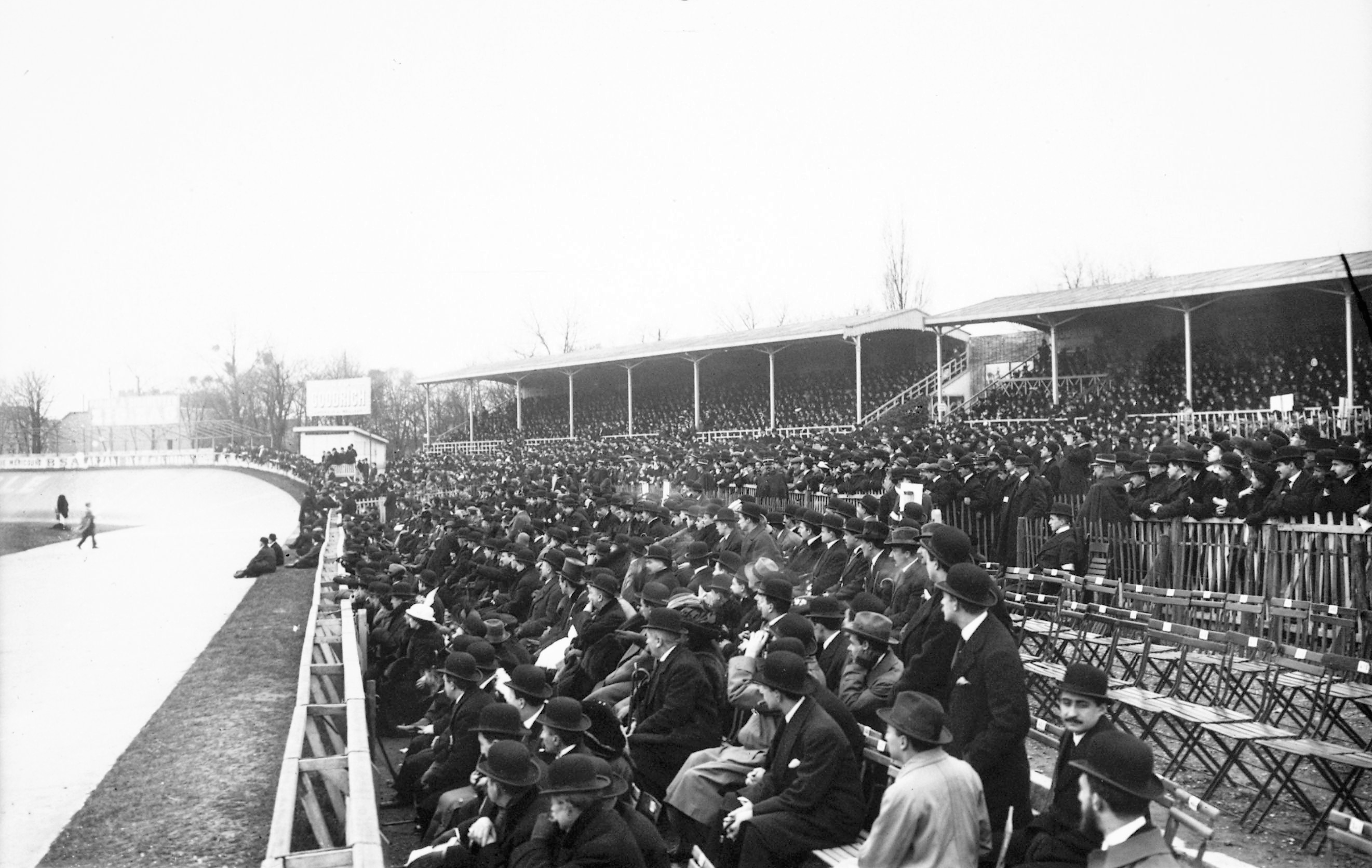
The Parc des Princes in Paris (1913 image), venue of the three Dubonnet Cup finals

The Dubonnet Cup was an invitational English football exhibition cup game held between 1910 and 1912 and played in Paris.

The game was an annual event the aim of which was to generate interest in the French amateur football leagues and helped lead to the establishment of the French Football Federation.

== Trophy ==
The cup is a large vase trophy which weighs in at approximately 112 lb (51 kg).

As the Swindon Advertiser reported, following Swindon Town's victory in 1910:

"It is of massive design, weighing nearly a hundredweight [51kg], and its style is distinctly French. It is not, perhaps, so attractive and polished a trophy as one might have expected, and when the players themselves first saw it displayed on the Paris ground, and guarded by a Gendarme with drawn sword! they did not (in the words of the popular Secretary) think much of it. But a close inspection is sufficient to show that it is a beautiful work of art. It is a facsimile of an historic cup which is now in the British Museum."

In the years that followed, the trophy resided at the Swindon Town clubhouse, until it was lost in 1992. By 1997, it was back in the Town fold.

== Finals ==
5 May 1910

Swindon Town	2–1	Barnsley
Fleming (2)	Report	Lilycrop

Parc des Princes, Paris
Attendance: 7,000

Swindon Town and Barnsley were invited to compete for the cup following both teams' performances in the FA Cup of 1910. Swindon and Barnsley both lost to the eventual winners Newcastle United, Swindon in the Semi-final and Barnsley being Runners-up.

Both clubs sent full-strength teams to Paris for the competition, and played with the cup being guarded at the pitch side.

Harold Fleming scored both of Swindon's goals with Lilycroft scoring for Barnsley.

"The Frenchmen seem to have been highly delighted with the match, which was not in any sense a 'holiday game.' Barnsley played vigorous football, but completely lost their heads towards the finish, when the Town led by 2–1, especially after Boyle had missed a penalty. The kick was given against Tout for handling, but Boyle shot straight into Skiller's hands."

"The five thousand spectators who, in spite of the rain, witnessed the Swindon-Barnsley match were able to say that they had seen a really good game of Association football. For an hour and a half it was a typical representation of the English national game. It was not an exhibition of football; it was a well-fought game. If it was possible to describe such an encounter, we should do it, because it was an admirable education for our players, who have seen how far one is able to go in the art of playing football. It gave great satisfaction to the French amateurs"

"Mr Allen, the Swindon secretary, did not hide from me, after the match, the pleasure it gave him to take this magnificent Cup back to Swindon. Boyle, the efficient Barnsley captain, could not conceal his disappointment of not winning the Cup."

Swindon went on to become Runners-up in the following season's Charity Shield match versus Manchester United.

On 7 May 1911 Clapton Orient beat Millwall 3–0 to win the Dubonnet Cup with goals from Fred Parker, George Scott and Phil Prior before 12,000 Paris fans.

Swindon and Barnsley met again in the FA Cup semi-final of 1911–12 with Barnsley winning a replay 1–0. Barnsley went on to win the competition.

1911

Clapton Orient F.C.	3–0	Millwall

Parc des Princes, Paris
1912

Fulham	4–1	Queens Park Rangers

Parc des Princes, Paris
