= List of Swindon Town F.C. players =

This is a list of notable footballers who have played for Swindon Town F.C. Generally, this means players that have played 100 or more first-class matches for the club. However, some players are included who have played fewer matches but made significant contributions to the club's history (e.g. Macari, Austin, Hoddle, McMahon and Fjørtoft).

- For a list of all Swindon Town players, major or minor, with a Wikipedia article, see Category:Swindon Town F.C. players
- For current players see Swindon Town F.C. Current squad
- For player and club records see Swindon Town F.C. records

Players are listed in alphabetical order. Appearances and goals are for first-team competitive matches only (including Cup matches). Substitute appearances included.

Statistics correct as of 11 January 2020.

Name	Nationality	Position	Period	Appearances	Goals
Trevor Gillis	Scotland	DF	1976–79	138	140
Jimmy Allan	Scotland	GK	1971–83	436	
Wayne Allison	England	FW	1995–97	120	36
Trevor Anderson	Northern Ireland	FW	1974–77	162	47
Bob Archer	England	DF	1921–31	208	4
Septimus Atterbury	England	DF	1903–07	124	4
Charlie Austin	England	FW	2009–11, 2022–24	122	54
Kevin Baddeley	England	DF	1981–85	111	3
Colin Bailie	Northern Ireland	DF	1982–85	121	4
Jimmy Bain	Scotland	MF	1947–54	255	43
Dave Bamber	England	FW	1985–88	137	46
Charlie Bannister	England	DF	1900s, 1906–12	256	11
Leigh Barnard	England	MF	1982–89	267	26
Billy Batty	England	MF	1912–22	116	46
Paul Batty	England	MF	1982–84	126	12
Ray Betteridge	England	FW	1951–54	121	26
Danny Bew	England	DF	1923–30	225	5
Walter Bingley	England	DF	1958–60	103	0
Paul Bodin	Wales	DF	1988–91, 1992–96	297	40
Tommy Bolland	England	MF	1909–21	176	15
Frank Boulton	England	GK	1946–50	103	
Archie Bown	England	MF	1903–04, 1907–15	272	139
Ted Braithwaite	England	MF	1929–33	147	6
Dennis Brown	England	FW	1964–67	106	45
Frank Burrows	Scotland	MF	1968–74	351	9
Sam Burton	England	GK	1946–61	509	
Joe Butler	England	DF	1965–76	428	21
Nathan Byrne	England	DF	2013–15	108	11
Paul Caddis	Scotland	DF	2010–13, 2019–20	111	6
Colin Calderwood	Scotland	DF	1985–93	414	21
Roy Carter	England	MF	1977–82	236	39
Dion Conroy	England	DF	2017–22	123	2
Reggie Cooper	England	WH	1922–29	100	
Harry Cousins	England	MF	1932–47	369	1
Peter Coyne	England	MF	1984–89	137	41
Jim Cross	England	MF	1953–58	163	6
Ian Culverhouse	England	DF	1994–98	117	
Arnold D'Arcy	England	DF	1956–64	238	33
Bertie Davies	England	FW	1913–14, 1919–27	276	31
Tom Davies	England	FW	1900–03	109	14
Sol Davis	England	DF	1997–2002	130	0
Owen Dawson	England	DF	1962–71	232	4
Bertie Denyer	England	FW	1914–30	373	66
Wally Dickinson	England	DF	1924–30	252	21
Fraser Digby	England	GK	1986–98	505	0
Will Dixon	England	MF	1973–77	165	13
Peter Downsborough	England	GK	1965–73	320	0
Tom Duckworth	England	DF	1934–37	137	0
David Duke	Scotland	DF	2000–05	234	8
Peter Eastoe	England	FW	1973–76	108	51
Joe Eddleston	England	FW	1926–32	219	67
Bob Edwards	England	FW	1955–59	185	69
Don Emery	Wales	MF	1937–48	103	12
Gary Emmanuel	Wales	MF	1981–84	131	9
Scott Endersby	England	GK	1983–85	100	
Rhys Evans	England	GK	2003–06	128	
Simon Ferry	Scotland	MF	2009–13	175	9
Jan Åge Fjørtoft	Norway	FW	1993–95	87	39
Harold Fleming	England	FW	1907–24	332	203
Wes Foderingham	England	GK	2012–15	192	
Steve Foley	England	MF	1987–92	190	29
Andy Ford	England	DF	1977–80	123	1
Alan Fowler	England	FW	1934–40	224	102
Jon Gittens	England	DF	1987–91	165	7
Ben Gladwin	England	MF	2013–17, 2021–23	144	21
Ty Gooden	England	MF	1993–2000	165	11
Mike Graham	England	MF	1981–85	163	1
Bart Griemink	Netherlands	GK	1999–2004	144	
Andy Gurney	England	DF	2001–04, 2005–06	176	25
Frank Handley	England	MF	1911–15	129	2
Stan Harland	England	MF	1966–71	294	8
Micky Hazard	England	MF	1990–93	143	18
Don Heath	England	FW	1967–70	106	3
Fred Hemmings	England	GK	1903–12	106	
Charlie Henry	England	MF	1980–89	269	29
Matthew Hewlett	England	MF	2000–05	200	7
Matthew Heywood	England	DF	2001–05	208	10
Dave Hockaday	England	DF	1983–90	308	11
Glenn Hoddle	England	MF	1991–93	75	3
Kevin Horlock	Northern Ireland	MF	1992–97	199	26
Arthur Horsfield	England	FW	1969–72	132	57
Bobby Howe	England	MF	1998–2002	135	11
Garth Hudson	England	MF	1948–59	427	11
Ernie Hunt	England	MF	1960–65	237	88
George Hunt	England	DF	1947–58	328	
Ellis Iandolo	England	DF	2015–23	172	4
Jerel Ifil	England	DF	2003–09	210	3
Danny Invincibile	Australia	FW	2000–03	144	27
Jimmy Ithell	Wales	MF	1946–50	118	1
Cliff Jackson	England	FW	1958–63	108	35
Bob Jefferson	England	FW	1908–22	356	82
Tommy Jenkins	England	FW	1972–76	114	5
Jack Johnson	England	FW	1921–27	162	69
Eddie Jones	Wales	FW	1936–48	189	34
Morris Jones	England	FW	1947–50	101	52
Tom Jones	England	MF	1988–92	207	12
Chris Kamara	England	MF	1977–81, 1985–88	298	32
Yaser Kasim	Iraq	MF	2013–17	122	7
Harry Kay	England	DF	1908–22	295	
Harry Kaye	England	MF	1947–53	189	5
David Kerslake	England	DF	1989–93, 1996–97, 1998–99	197	1
Phil King	England	DF	1987–89, 1997–99	150	4
Scott Leitch	Scotland	MF	1996–2000	133	3
Russell Lewis	Wales	DF	1976–83	216	9
Archie Ling	England	GK	1905–09	147	
Martin Ling	England	MF	1986, 1991–96	190	13
William Lloyd	Wales	DF	1939–51	120	2
Neil Logan	Scotland	MF	1898–1902, 1903–06	162	4
David Low	England	MF	1927–32	162	1
Billy Lucas	Wales	MF	1937–48	194	48
Harry Lunn	Northern Ireland	FW	1948–54	214	31
Massimo Luongo	Australia	MF	2013–15	102	14
Lou Macari	Scotland	MF	1984–89	43	4
Ross Maclaren	Scotland	DF	1988–95	245	12
Alan Mayes	England	FW	1979–80, 1983–85	184	83
Jon-Paul McGovern	Scotland	MF	2007–11	153	8
Ray McHale	England	MF	1976–80	216	42
John McLaughlin	England	DF	1973–79	237	9
Alan McLoughlin	Ireland	MF	1986–90	136	25
Steve McMahon	England	MF	1994–99	51	
Ken McPherson	England	MF	1961–65	121	6
Stefani Miglioranzi	Brazil	MF	2002–06	136	9
Ian Miller	Scotland	FW	1978–81	159	14
Keith Morgan	England	MF	1956–69	365	9
George Morrall	England	MF	1936–39	107	5
Harry Morris	England	FW	1926–33	279	229
David Moss	England	FW	1969–78, 1985–86	275	82
Ted Nash	England	GK	1916–30	253	
Andrew Nicholas	England	DF	2003–08	126	4
Peter Noble	England	FW	1968–73	256	80
Mel Nurse	Wales	MF	1965–68	143	13
Jonathan Obika	Nigeria	DF	2010–11, 2014–17	108	28
Sean O'Hanlon	England	DF	2004–06	112	10
Roy Onslow	England	FW	1947–52, 1953–56	149	25
Maurice Owen	England	DF	1946–63	601	165
Edward Painter	England	MF	1938–51	104	6
Sam Parkin	England	FW	2002–05	142	73
Tim Parkin	England	DF	1986–89	144	8
Billy Paynter	England	FW	2007–10	122	45
Lee Peacock	Scotland	FW	2006–10	126	20
Willie Penman	Scotland	MF	1966–70	120	22
Frank Peters	England	FW	1933–36	114	51
Michael Pook	England	MF	2003–09	109	3
Colin Prophett	England	DF	1974–78	186	12
Jimmy Quinn	Northern Ireland	FW	1981–84, 1986–88, 1999–2000	154	61
Chris Ramsey	England	DF	1984–87	122	6
Alan Reeves	England	DF	1998–2006	237	13
John Richards	England	FW	1956–59	110	39
Georgie Richardson	England	MF	1895–1902	126	13
Paul Rideout	England	FW	1980–83, 1990–91	114	42
Matt Ritchie	Scotland	MF	2010–13	131	28
Christian Roberts	Wales	FW	2004–08	111	21
Leslie Roberts	England	MF	1927–30	119	35
Mark Robinson	England	DF	1994–2002	316	4
Steve Robinson	England	MF	2001–05	158	6
Dave Rogers	England	MF	1914–26	181	30
Don Rogers	England	FW	1962–72, 1976	490	178
Raphael Rossi Branco	Brazil	DF	2013–17	131	7
Andy Rowland	England	FW	1978–86	345	98
Duncan Shearer	Scotland	FW	1988–92	199	98
Hartley Shutt	England	DF	1896–00	101	
Billy Silto	England	MF	1909–20	228	5
Fitzroy Simpson	Jamaica	MF	1988–92	130	10
Len Skiller	England	GK	1909–22	316	
Roger Smart	England	MF	1959–73	410	60
Jack Smith	England	FW	1961–64	109	48
Jack Smith	Wales	DF	1935–38	129	
Jack Smith	England	DF	2005–09	138	9
John Smith	England	FW	1968–71	116	15
Phil Smith	England	GK	2006–12	132	
Kenny Stroud	England	MF	1971–82	373	19
Mike Summerbee	England	FW	1958–65	244	40
Nicky Summerbee	England	MF	1987–94, 2005	135	10
David Syrett	England	FW	1973–77	135	39
Frank Talia	Australia	GK	1995–2000	118	
Shaun Taylor	England	DF	1991–96	259	33
Michael Timlin	Ireland	MF	2006–12	120	6
Alec Thom	Scotland	MF	1926–30	111	25
Rod Thomas	Wales	DF	1964–73	355	5
Louis Thompson	Wales	MF	2011–16	106	7
Nathan Thompson	England	DF	2009–17	187	4
Billy Tout	England	MF	1905–	405	55
John Trollope	England	DF	1960–81	889	28
Lawrence Vigouroux	Chile	GK	2015–19	104	
Jock Walker	Scotland	DF	1907–13	239	
Mark Walters	England	FW	1996–99	126	28
Billy Wareing	England	MF	1920–25	168	10
Tober Weston	England	DF	1912–29	344	9
Freddie Wheatcroft	England	FW	1905–06, 1909–15	240	95
Steve White	England	FW	1986–94	312	111
Stan Wilcockson	England	DF	1935–39	149	5
Frank Wildman	England	GK	1936–46	153	
Andy Williams	England	FW	2012–15	105	35
Brian Williams	England	MF	1978–81	122	10
Gordon Williams	England	FW	1945–57	162	25
Jonny Williams	Wales	MF	2021–23	84	15
Bobby Woodruff	England	DF	1958–64	205	20
Albert Young	Wales	DF	1946–50	134	1
