= List of Swindon Town F.C. records and statistics =

This page details Swindon Town Football Club records.

== Player records ==
=== Appearances ===
- Youngest first-team player – Paul Rideout, 16 years 107 days (v. Hull City, 29 November 1980)

==== Most appearances ====
As of 1 February 2007. (Former players only, competitive matches only, includes appearances as substitute):

	Name	Games	Goals
1	John Trollope	889	28
2	Maurice Owen	601	165
3	Sam Burton	509	0
4	Fraser Digby	505	0
5	Don Rogers	490	178
6	Jimmy Allan	436	0
7	Joe Butler	501	17
8	Garth Hudson	427	11
9	Colin Calderwood	414	21
10	Roger Smart	410	60
11	Billy Tout	405	55
12	Kenny Stroud	373	19
13	Bertie Denyer	371	65
14	Harry Cousins	369	1
15	Keith Morgan	365	9
16	Bob Jefferson	356	82
17	Rod Thomas	355	5
18	Frank Burrows	351	9
19	Andy Rowland	345	98
20	Albert Weston	344	9
21	Harold Fleming	332	203
22	George Hunt	328	0
23	Peter Downsborough	320	0
24	Mark Robinson	316	4
25	Len Skiller	316	0

=== Goalscorers ===
- Most goals in a season – 48, Harry Morris (1926–27)
- Most League goals in a season – 47, Harry Morris, (1926–27)
- Most goals in a single match – 5

Harry Morris (v. Queens Park Rangers, Third Division South, 18 December 1926)
Harry Morris (v. Norwich City, Third Division South, 26 April 1930)
Keith East (v. Mansfield Town, Third Division, 20 November 1965)

- Most goals in the League – 216, Harry Morris

==== Top scorers ====
As of 18 November 2006 (competitive matches only):

	Name	Goals	Games	Average
1	Harry Morris	229	279	0.82
2	Harold Fleming	203	332	0.61
3	Don Rogers	178	490	0.36
4	Maurice Owen	165	601	0.27
5	Archie Bown	139	272	0.51
6	Steve White	111	312	0.36
7	Alan Fowler	102	224	0.46
8	Andy Rowland	98	345	0.28
9	Duncan Shearer	98	199	0.49
10	Freddy Wheatcroft	95	240	0.40
11	Ernie Hunt	88	237	0.37
12	Alan Mayes	83	184	0.45
13	Bob Jefferson	82	356	0.23
14	David Moss	82	275	0.30
15	Peter Noble	80	256	0.31
16	Sam Parkin	73	142	0.51
17	Bob Edwards	69	185	0.37
18	Jack Johnson	69	162	0.43
19	Joe Eddleston	67	219	0.31
20	Bertie Denyer	65	371	0.18
21	Jimmy Quinn	61	154	0.40
22	Roger Smart	60	410	0.15
23	Arthur Horsfield	57	132	0.43
24	Billy Tout	55	405	0.14
25	Frank Richardson	54	97	0.56

== Club records ==
=== Wins ===
- Most League wins in a season – 32 in 46 matches, Fourth Division, 1985–86
- Fewest League wins in a season –

0 in 16 matches, Western League, 1901–02
2 in 16 matches, Western League, 1900–01
2 in 30 matches, Southern League First Division, 1901–02

=== Defeats ===
- Most League defeats in a season – 26 in 46 matches, First Division, 1999–2000
- Fewest League defeats in a season –

2 in 8 matches, Western League, 1898–99
4 in 46 matches, Second Division, 1995–96

=== Goals ===
- Most League goals scored in a season – 100 in 42 matches, Third Division South, 1926–27
- Fewest League goals scored in a season –

7 in 6 matches, Western League, 1899–1900
17 in 30 matches, Southern League First Division, 1901–02

- Most League goals conceded in a season – 105 in 42 matches, Third Division South, 1932–33
- Fewest League goals conceded in a season –

7 in 6 matches, Western League, 1899–1900
31 in 38 matches, Southern League First Division, 1910–11

=== Points ===
- Most points in a League season (2 for a win) – 64 in 46 matches, Third Division, 1968–69
- Most points in a League season (3 for a win) – 102 in 46 matches, Fourth Division, 1985–86

=== Matches ===
==== Firsts ====
- First match

(Unofficial history) – v. Rovers F.C., Friendly, 29 November 1879 (lost 4–0)
(Official history) – v. St. Mark's Young Men's Friendly Society, Friendly, 12 November 1881 (drew 2–2)

- First FA Cup match (pre-qualifying) – v. Watford Rovers, First Round, 23 October 1886 (won 1–0)
- First FA Cup match (proper) – v. Brighton and Hove Albion, First Round, 13 January 1906 (lost 3–0)
- First League match – v. Reading, Southern League First Division, 22 September 1894 (lost 4–3)
- First European match – v. A.S. Roma, Anglo-Italian League Cup, 27 August 1969 (lost 2–1)
- First League Cup match – v. Shrewsbury Town, 12 October 1960 (won 2–1)

==== Record wins ====
- Record League win – 9–1 (home v. Luton Town, Third Division South, 28 August 1920)
- Record FA Cup win – 10–1 (away v. Farnham United Breweries, 28 November 1925)

==== Record defeats ====
- Record League defeat – 0–8 (away v. Loughborough, Second Division, 12 December 1896)
- Record FA Cup defeat – 1–10 (away v. Manchester City, 25 January 1930)

==== Transfers ====
- Record transfer fee received – £4,000,000 from Q.P.R. for Ben Gladwin & Massimo Luongo, May 2015.
- Record transfer fee paid – £800,000 to West Ham for Joey Beauchamp, August 1994.

==== Attendance ====
- Highest attendance at a home match – 32,000 (v. Arsenal, FA Cup third round replay, 15 January 1972)

==== Gate Receipts ====
- Record gate receipts – £149,371 vs Bolton Wanderers, Football League Cup Semi Final First Leg, 12 February 1995.
