= Blauw-Wit Amsterdam =

Coordinates: 52°20′22″N 4°48′24″E

Blauw Wit
- Full name: FC Blauw-Wit Amsterdam
- Nickname(s): de Zebra's
- Founded: 10 May 1902
- Dissolved: 2015
- Ground: Sportpark Sloten
- Capacity: 2,000
Home colours

FC Blauw-Wit Amsterdam (English: Blue-White) was a Dutch football club from Amsterdam. The name referred to the colours of their uniform, blue and white.

== History ==
Founded on 10 May 1902 as a local club in the Kinkerbuurt area of Amsterdam, from 1928 it started to play its home matches in the Olympic Stadium in Amsterdam. The club entered professional football in the Netherlands in 1954. In 1972 the club merged with Volewijckers and DWS to form FC Amsterdam. Blauw-Wit continued as an amateur club, that still exists today. Originally named VICTORIA! the club merged with another neighborhood club Holland from which point the combined clubs took on the name Blauw-Wit and were permitted into the Derde Klasse by the NVB.

From 1914 until 1928 Blauw-Wit played in the Old Stadion, before moving a few hundred metres west to the Olympic Stadium. The club championed the Eerste Klasse KNVB West I seven times (then the highest class in Dutch football). The club joined the professional football league Eredivisie from its inception in 1954. In 1967 Blauw-Wit left the Olympic Stadium, due to dwindling numbers of spectators. Until the summer of 1972 Blauw Wit was allowed to play on two of the three side fields. Then the club merged with Volewijckers and DWS to form FC Amsterdam in 1972.

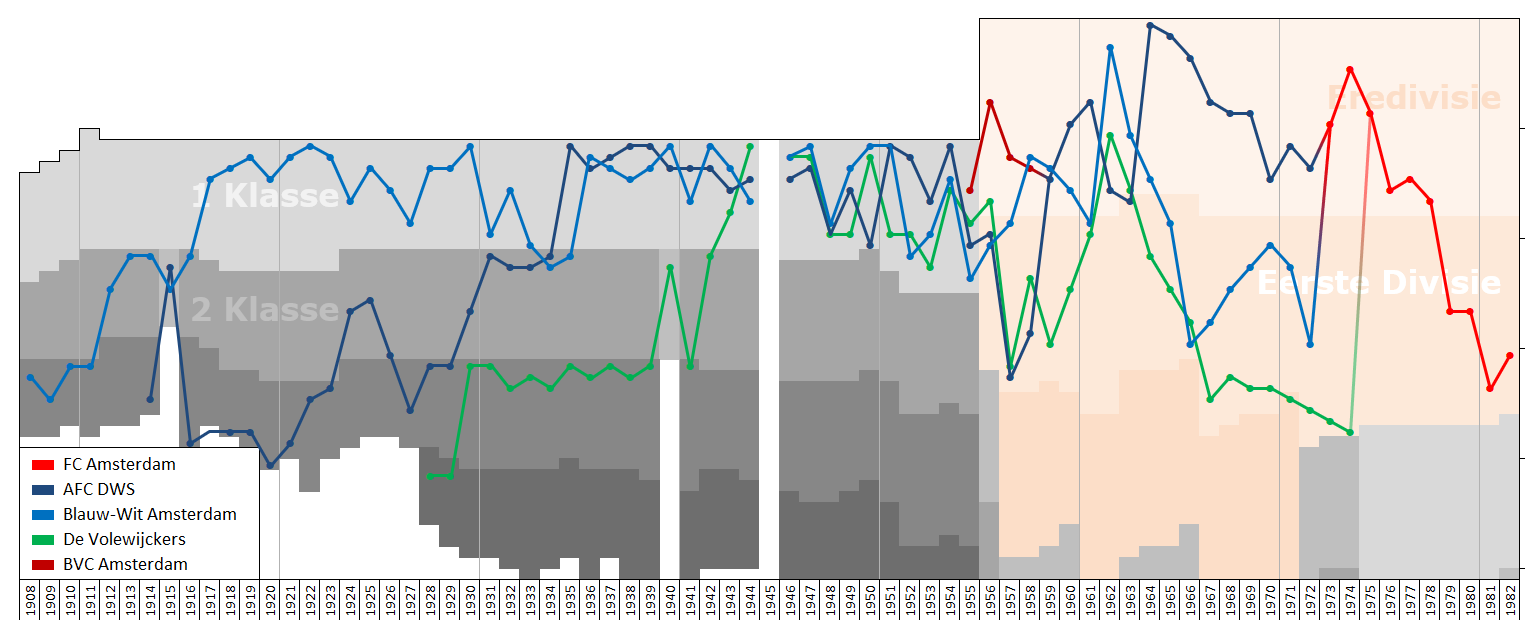
Historical chart of FC Amsterdam league performance (Blauw-Wit shown in light blue)

The remaining amateur club fused once more in 2002, this time with Osdorp-Sport to form asv Blauw-Wit Osdorp and then in 2003 with KBV, Neerlandia/SLTO and Sparta Amsterdam back to FC Blauw-Wit Amsterdam. In 2015 Blauw-Wit merged with another Amsterdam club VV De Beursbengels to form Blauw-Wit Beursbengels, ending a storied club's era.

== Stadsderby against Ajax ==
De Stadsderby (English: "City derby") was a local football rivalry between both Amsterdam clubs Ajax and Blauw-Wit, both teams shared the Olympic Stadium for home games from 1928 until 1972. In total the two sides have competed in a total of 52 matches in Cup and league play, not counting friendly encounters between the two sides. Of those meets, Ajax have won 23 matches and Blauw-Wit have won 16. The remaining 13 matches ended in a draw. The goal difference between the two clubs is 83–66 in favor of Ajax. The first competition match between the two clubs was 1914/15 season. The last competitive encounter between the sides was in the 1963/64 season. The 7"-inch single "De Voetbalmatch" of Dutch cabaret artist Louis Davids, released in 1929 on His Master's Voice is a song recounting an encounter of Blauw-Wit against Ajax.

== Supporters ==
In the early years many supporters decked out in the team colors and with cars painted in the blue and white zebra colors would accompany the players to the away games against the other five district champions in the Championship, which was not ordinary at that time. In 1950 against Ajax (Rinus Michels), Enschedese Boys, Heerenveen (Abe Lenstra), Limburgia and Maurits. During these matches the supporters of Blauw-Wit could be heard loud and clear singing (Ons ideaal, dat is Blauwwit, de Club waar pit in zit, de Club van het Stadion, kwam, zag en overwon, invariably ended with the yell alabimba, alabimba, blauwwit, blauwwit, blauwwit!!) (English: Our ideal, that is Blauw-Wit, the club with a pit in it, the club from the Stadium, that came, saw and conquered).

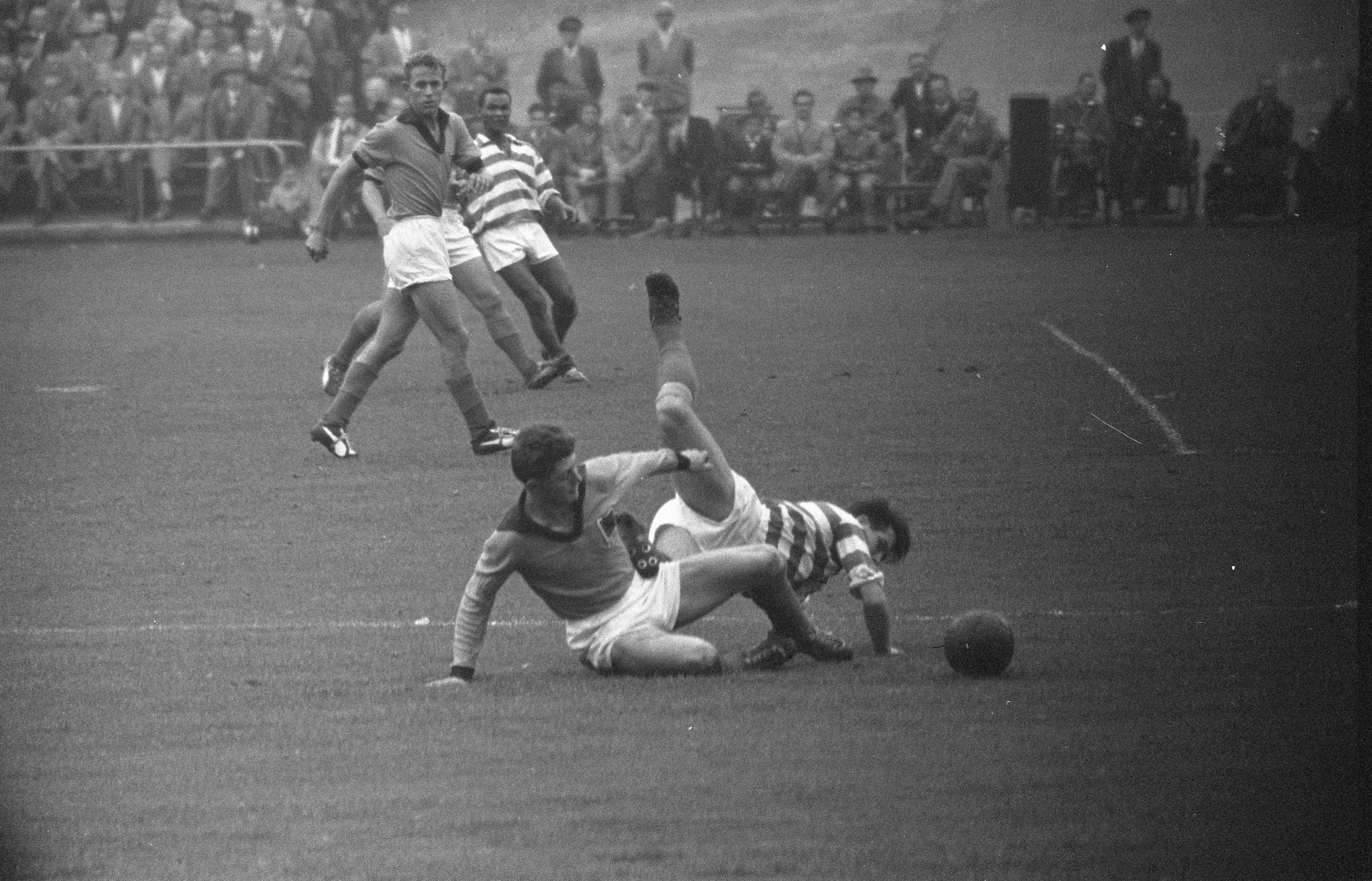
Blauw-Wit – Volendam, 11 oktober 1959.

== National team players ==
The following players have played for the Netherlands national football team while playing for Blauw-Wit:

- 1 Co Bergman 8x (31–10–1937; 28–11–1937; 31–3–1940; 10–3–1946; 27–11–1946; 7–4–1947; 4–5–1947; 26–5–1947)
- 2 Cor Wilders 8x (31–1–1937; 4–4–1937; 2–5–1937; 23–4–1939; 7–5–1939; 17–3–1940; 21–4–1940; 10–3–1946)
- 3 Hermanus van Diermen 5x (5–4–1920; 13–5–1920; 16–5–1920; 15–5–1921; 12–6–1921)
- 4 Eb van der Kluft 4x (12–6–1921; 2–4–1923; 29–4–1923; 10–5–1923)
- 5 Frans Hombörg 2x (9–6–1929; 12–6–1929)
- 6 Ferry Petterson 2x (5–9–1962; 14–10–1962)
- 7 Ko Stijger 2x (17–3–1940; 10–3–1946)
- 8 Feike Lietzen 1x (26–3–1922)
- 9 Ferry Mesman 1x (15–10–1950)
- 10 Herman van Raalte 1x (21–11–1948)
- 11 Jan Schindeler 1x (19–4–1925)
- 12 Kees Slot 1x (31–3–1940)

Below is a unique national team selection with 3 Blauwwitters, amongst them the team captain, plus 1 on the bench. The Dutch won the match 6–2 against Luxembourg on 10 March 1946.

- Luxembourg – Netherlands: 2 – 6
- Manager: Karel Kaufman
- Players: Piet Kraak, Cor Wilders (captain), Henk van der Linden, Jan van Buijtenen, Henk Pellikaan, Ko Stijger, Jan Holleman, Faas Wilkes, Abe Lenstra, Kees Rijvers, Co Bergman.
- Players on the bench: Herman van Raalte, Jan Potharst, A.W.H. van der Veen, Anton van der Vegt
- The Dutch goals were scored by Faas Wilkes 4x, Kees Rijvers 1x, Co Bergman 1x.

== The rise and fall in professional football 1954–1972 (1982) ==
In 1954 the club joined the ranks of professional football, after BVC Amsterdam had already stripped the club of all its players just prior (amongst others Hanny Tolmeijer). The players renounced their amateur club membership, and left without compensation to jump straight into professional football. Considered very weak by the old supporters (known as the Foreign Legion, with members such as Frans van der Klink, Douwe Damsma, Nico Engelander, Anton Goedhart, Jan Dahrs, Wim van Biljouw, Erwin Sparendam). Playing in paid football the club were however not able to reach their previous form and relegated in 1960 to the Eerste Divisie.

Despite the club's illustrious amateur history, the professional football section of Blauw-Wit merged with the Volewijckers and DWS to form FC Amsterdam in 1972. Along with the shabby remnants of the BVC Amsterdam, which had already been merged with the paid section of DWS and in 1974 with the paid section of the Volewijckers. FC Amsterdam was dissolved in 1982.

Famous professional players of Blauw-Wit were Barry Hughes, Herman Rijkaard, Regillio Vrede, Wietze Couperus, Martin Koeman, Bennie Müller.

The introduction of professional football, and the founding of the BVC Amsterdam, put an end to a glorious history of three former top football clubs from Amsterdam. Ajax are the only club to survive the transition into paid football, with the fewest players leaving the club to join BVC Amsterdam, which was in part because the Ajax-players were already paid compensation from the club, even before the introduction of paid football in the Netherlands.

=== Professional football results 1954 – 1972 ===
13 C	2 B	1 B	13	14	16	1 B	3	11	15	3	14	10	7	5	3	5	12
55	56	57	58	59	60	61	62	63	64	65	66	67	68	69	70	71	72
Eredivisie / Eerste Divisie; Eerste Klasse 54/55-55/56

== Amateur team section (1965–2015) ==
The amateur team of the club is still active, and after several mergers have reclaimed the name FC Blauw-Wit Amsterdam.

In the 1965/66 season the team started over in the Vierde Klasse of amateur football in the Netherlands. Winning championships in 1968/69, 1969/70, 1973/74 and 1976/77 resulted in the club reaching the highest level of amateur level within short time, competing in the Hoofdklasse. In the 1979/80 season Blauw-Wit were relegated to the Eerste Klasse once more. However winning the 1981/82 title brought the team back into the Hoofdklasse the next year. They were then relegated once more in the 1984/85 season to the Eerste Klasse, championing in it once more in 1986/87. The team relegated once more in 1990/91, and in 2003/04 were then promoted back to the Hoofdklasse. It has however relegated thrice since and in 2014–15 last played in the Derde Klasse.

== Final results by competition ==
Semiprofessional

- 1972 Professional section of Blauw-Wit lifted, after fusion with FC Amsterdam.
- 1963/64 15th Eredivisie, relegation to the Eerste Divisie
- 1962/63 11th Eredivisie
- 1961/62 3rd Eredivisie
- 1960/61 Champions, Eerste Divisie B, promoted to the Eredivisie
- 1959/60 16th Eredivisie, after deciding match against Elinkwijk (0–1), relegation to the Eerste Divisie
- 1958/59 14th Eredivisie
- 1957/58 13th Eredivisie
- 1956/57 Champions, Eerste Klasse B, promoted to the Eredivisie
- 1954/55 Eerste Klasse C

Amateurs

- 1951 4th Football League Championship with DWS, Heerenveen, PSV, Willem II
- 1950/51 Champions Eerste Klasse district West
- 1950 2nd Football League Championship with Ajax, Enschedese Boys, Heerenveen, Limburgia, Maurits
- 1949/50 Champions Eerste Klasse district West
- 1947 6th Football League Championship with Ajax, BVV, Heerenveen, MVV, NEC
- 1946/47 Champions Eerste Klasse district West
- 1942 4th Football League Championship with ADO, AGOVV, Eindhoven, Heerenveen
- 1941/42 Champions Eerste Klasse district West
- 1940 2nd Football League Championship with Feijenoord, GVAV, Heracles, Juliana
- Although Blauw-Wit defeated Feijenoord 5–1, Feijenoord still managed to win the national title, only 2 points ahead of Blauw-Wit
- 1939/40 Champions Eerste Klasse district West
- 1930 5th Football League Championship with Ajax, Go Ahead, Velocitas, Willem II
- 1929/30 Champions Eerste Klasse district West
- 1922 Lost the deciding match against Go Ahead after extra time, 0–1.
- 1922 shared 1st Football League Championship with Be Quick, Go Ahead, NAC
- 1921/22 Champions Eerste Klasse district West

== Blauw-Wit in Europe ==
Season	Competition	Round	Country	Club	Score
1962–63	International Football Cup	Group	(Hungary)	Pécsi Dósza	0–0, 2–5
			(Socialist Federal Republic of Yugoslavia)	FK Velež Mostar	3–2, 1–1
			(Germany)	VfV Hildesheim	4–3, 0–1

== Former managers ==
- (England) Steve Bloomer (1918–1923)
- (England) Jack Reynolds (1925–1928)
- (Hungary) Josef Uridil (1933–1934)
- (England) Herbert Bellamy (1938–1939)
- (Hungary) Istvan Janovitz (1951–1953)
- (England) Ron Dellow (1954–1956)
- (Netherlands) Cor Sluyk (1956–1960)
- (Austria) Franz Fuchs (1960–1961)
- (England) Jack Mansell (1961–1962)
- (England) Keith Spurgeon (1962–1963)
- (Austria) Franz Fuchs (1963–1964)
- (Netherlands) Wim Vaal (1964)
- (England) Keith Spurgeon (1964–1966)
- (Netherlands) Janny van der Veen (1966–1968)
- (Netherlands) Henk Wullems (1968–1971)
- (Netherlands) Janny van der Veen (1971–1972)
- (Netherlands) Ulrich Landvreugd (2012)
