= 1911 FA Charity Shield =

- Event: FA Charity Shield
Manchester United	Swindon Town
8	4
- Date: 25 September 1911
- Venue: Stamford Bridge, London
- Attendance: 10,000

The 1911 FA Charity Shield was the fourth Charity Shield, an annual football match contested by the winners of the previous season's Football League and Southern League competitions. The match was played on 25 September 1911 between Manchester United, winners of the 1910–11 Football League, and Swindon Town, winners of the 1910–11 Southern League. Manchester United won the match 8–4 in front of only 10,000 fans at Stamford Bridge, London.

The match remains the highest-scoring match in Charity Shield history. Harold Halse scored six goals for Manchester United in this match, a record for the most goals scored by an individual in a Charity Shield match. It is also a record for the most goals scored by an individual Manchester United player in one match, a record that was not equalled for almost 60 years, until George Best in an 8–2 win over Northampton Town on 7 February 1970. Proceeds from the sale of tickets at this game were donated to the survivors of the RMS Titanic.

== Match details ==
25 September 1911

Manchester United	8–4	Swindon Town
Halse (6); Turnbull; Wall	Report	Fleming; Wheatcroft; Billy Tout; Jefferson

Stamford Bridge, London
Attendance: 10,000

GK	1	(Scotland) Hugh Edmonds
RB	2	(England) Leslie Hofton
LB	3	(England) George Stacey
RH	4	(England) Dick Duckworth
CH	5	(England) Charlie Roberts
LH	6	(Scotland) Alex Bell
OR	7	(Wales) Billy Meredith
IR	8	(Ireland) Mickey Hamill
CF	9	(England) Harold Halse
IL	10	(Scotland) Sandy Turnbull
OL	11	(England) George Wall
Manager:
(England) Ernest Mangnall

GK	1	(England) Len Skiller
RB	2	(England) Harry Kay
LB	3	(England) Billy Tout
RH	4	(England) Frank Handley
CH	5	(England) Charlie Bannister
LH	6	(England) Billy Silto
OR	7	(England) Bob Jefferson
IR	8	(England) Harold Fleming
CF	9	(England) Freddie Wheatcroft
IL	10	(England) Archie Bown
OL	11	(England) Sammy Lamb
Manager:
(England) Sam Allen
