= Adje Gerritse =

Dutch footballer

Personal information
- Full name: Adrianus Wilhelmus Antonius Jacobus Gerritse
- Date of birth: 4 June 1908
- Place of birth: Amsterdam, Netherlands
- Date of death: 17 August 1979 (aged 71)
- Place of death: Amsterdam, Netherlands
- Position: Winger

Senior career*
Years	Team	Apps	(Gls)
1926–1928	Blauw-Wit		
1928–1929	't Gooi		
1929–1933	Blauw-Wit		
1933–1934	TABA		
1934–1939	Alcmaria Victrix		

International career
1929	Netherlands	1	(0)
- * Club domestic league appearances and goals

Adje Gerritse (4 June 1908 – 17 August 1979) was a Dutch footballer. He played in one match for the Netherlands national football team in 1929.

Born in Amsterdam, Gerritse joined 't Gooi from hometown club Blauw-Wit and was called-up for the Oranje in 1929 alongside teammate Wim van Dolder. Also named Attie, Gerritse later played for the newly-formed club AFC TABA and Alcmaria Victrix.
