= Tober =

Tober may refer to:

- Tober (surname), a surname
- Tober, County Westmeath, a townland in County Westmeath, Ireland
- Tober Weston (1888–?), English footballer

== See also ==
- Tober Colleen Formation, a geologic formation in Ireland
