= SC 't Gooi =

Dutch football club

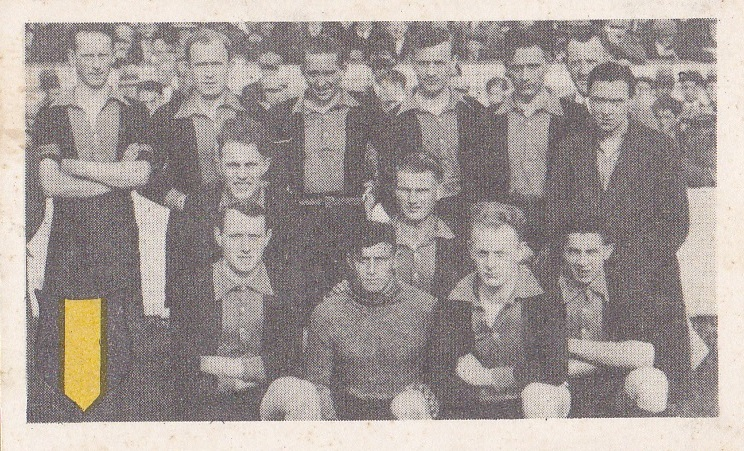
- 't Gooi in 1931
- Full name: Sport Club 't Gooi
- Founded: October 19, 1905; 120 years ago
- Ground: Sportpark Berestein, Hilversum
- Chairman: Jolanda Osendarp
- Head coach: Ed Otten
- League: Derde Klasse
Home colours

SC 't Gooi (Sport Club Het Gooi) is a sports club from Hilversum, Netherlands. The club was established on 19 October 1905 as Hilversumsche Voetbal Club Rapiditas, abbreviated as HVV 't Gooi. In the 1950s and 1960s it played professional soccer under this name. The professional division continued under the name SC Gooiland from 1965 until 1971. With Amsterdam nearby, many players of Ajax Amsterdam developed at 't Gooi.

== History ==
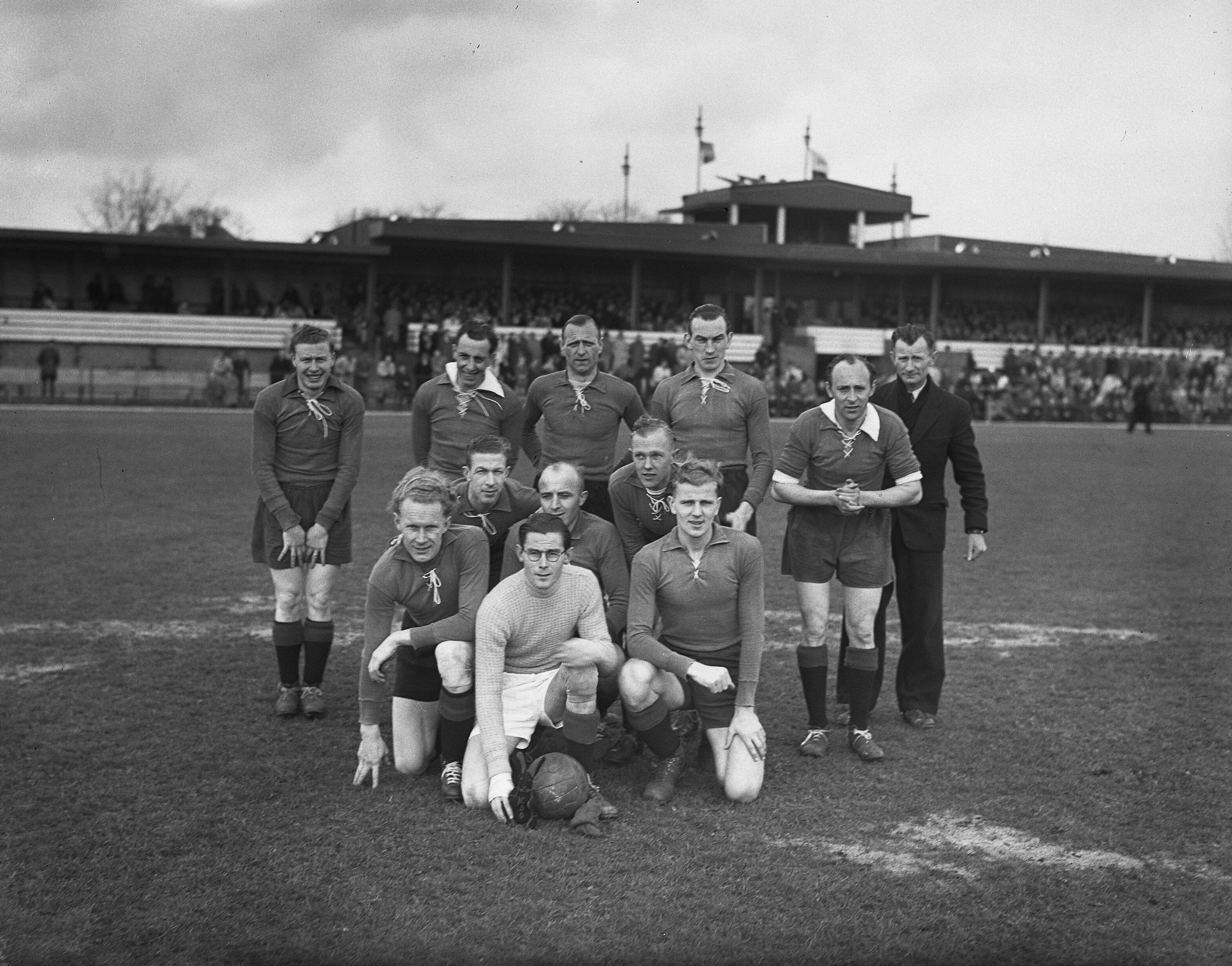
't Gooi vs EDO, March 1950

Henk Twelker played for 't Gooi 1921–22 continuing to Ajax Amsterdam. Wim Anderiesen played for 't Gooi 1922 through 1926, also continued to Ajax, as well to an international career on the Netherlands national football team. The English football manager Bob Jefferson coached the first squad 1927–1929, in his second season alongside FC Eindhoven.

Pim Bekkering starred in the club 1956 through 1957, before continuing to PSV Eindhoven. Rinus Schaap participated in the 1958 FIFA World Cup qualification while playing voor 't Gooi. Goalkeeper Theo Mostard also stood out on the Hilversum team during this time. The later Professor Herman Pleij also played at this time on the team. In the 1958–59 Tweede Divisie 't Gooi won the championship, along with Go Ahead Eagles from Deventer. Gert Bals was the goalie 1957 through 1961, like Bekkering continuing to PSV Eindhoven.

In Round 4 of the 1961-62 KNVB Cup 't Gooi lost 1–0 to Ajax Amsterdam. As SC Gooiland, the professional division reached in seasons 1967–68 and 1968–69 a seventh place in the Tweede Divisie. In 1971 it reached an all-time high with a sixth slot. Nevertheless, the club was forced to stop playing professional soccer as KNVB discontinued the Tweede Divisie.

Since the club engages in multiple sports, in 2001 the club was rebranded from Hilversum Football Club 't Gooi into Sports Club 't Gooi. Since 2013 the focus is again on football with secondary branches in tennis and table tennis. Diangi Matusiwa played in the youth of 't Gooi. In November 2017 the club had to withdraw its first soccer squad from the Vierde Klasse, lacking sufficient motivated players to continue.

== Players ==
=== National team players ===
The following players were called up to represent their national teams in international football and received caps during their tenure with SC 't Gooi:

- (Netherlands) Wim van Dolder (1925–1930)
- (Netherlands) Adje Gerritse (1928–1930)
- (Netherlands) Rinus Schaap (1947–1950; 1954–1957)

- Years in brackets indicate careerspan with SC 't Gooi.

== Historical list of coaches ==
- 1924: (England) Charlie Rance
- 1926–1929: (England) Bob Jefferson
- 1947–1948: (Scotland) Tom Bradshaw
- 1955–1956: (England) Ron Dellow
- 1956–1957: (Netherlands) Joop de Busser
- 1963–1964: (England) Ron Dellow
- 1964–1965: (Netherlands) Piet Kluit
- 1966–1967: (Netherlands) Ko Stijger
- 1969–1971: (England) Ron Dellow
