= Ko Bergman =

Dutch footballer (1913–1982)

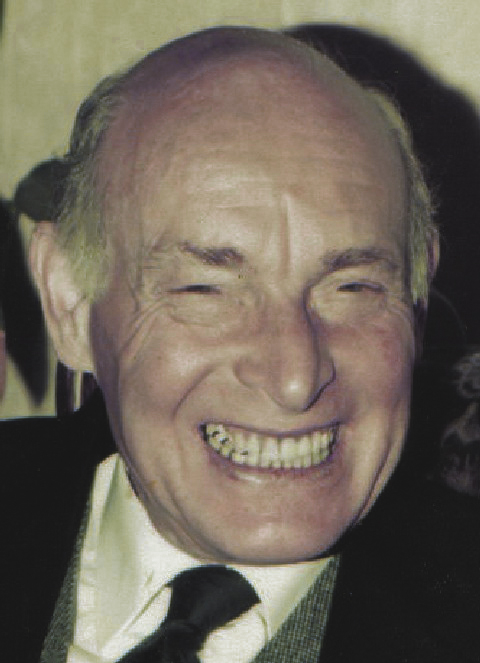

Personal information
- Date of birth: 16 December 1913
- Place of birth: Amsterdam, Netherlands
- Date of death: 19 November 1982 (aged 68)
- Place of death: Hellendoorn, Netherlands
- Position: Forward

Senior career*
Years	Team	Apps	(Gls)
1930-1951	Blauw-Wit		

International career
1937–1947	Netherlands	8	(5)
- * Club domestic league appearances and goals

Ko Bergman (16 December 1913 – 19 November 1982) was a Dutch footballer. He played in eight matches for the Netherlands national football team from 1937 to 1947.
