= Joe Silto =

British table tennis player

Personal information
- Nationality: England
- Born: 1911; Swindon, England
- Died: 1 February 2007; Swindon, England

Joseph Silto (1911 – 1 February 2007), was a male English international table tennis player.

== Table tennis career ==
He was the captain of England during the 1935–36 season. He played in the 1935 World Table Tennis Championships and 1936 World Table Tennis Championships.

== Personal life ==
He was born and lived in Swindon for his entire life. He was the son of English footballer Billy Silto.

== See also ==
- List of table tennis players
