= Franz Fuchs (footballer) =

Austrian football manager (1915–1990)

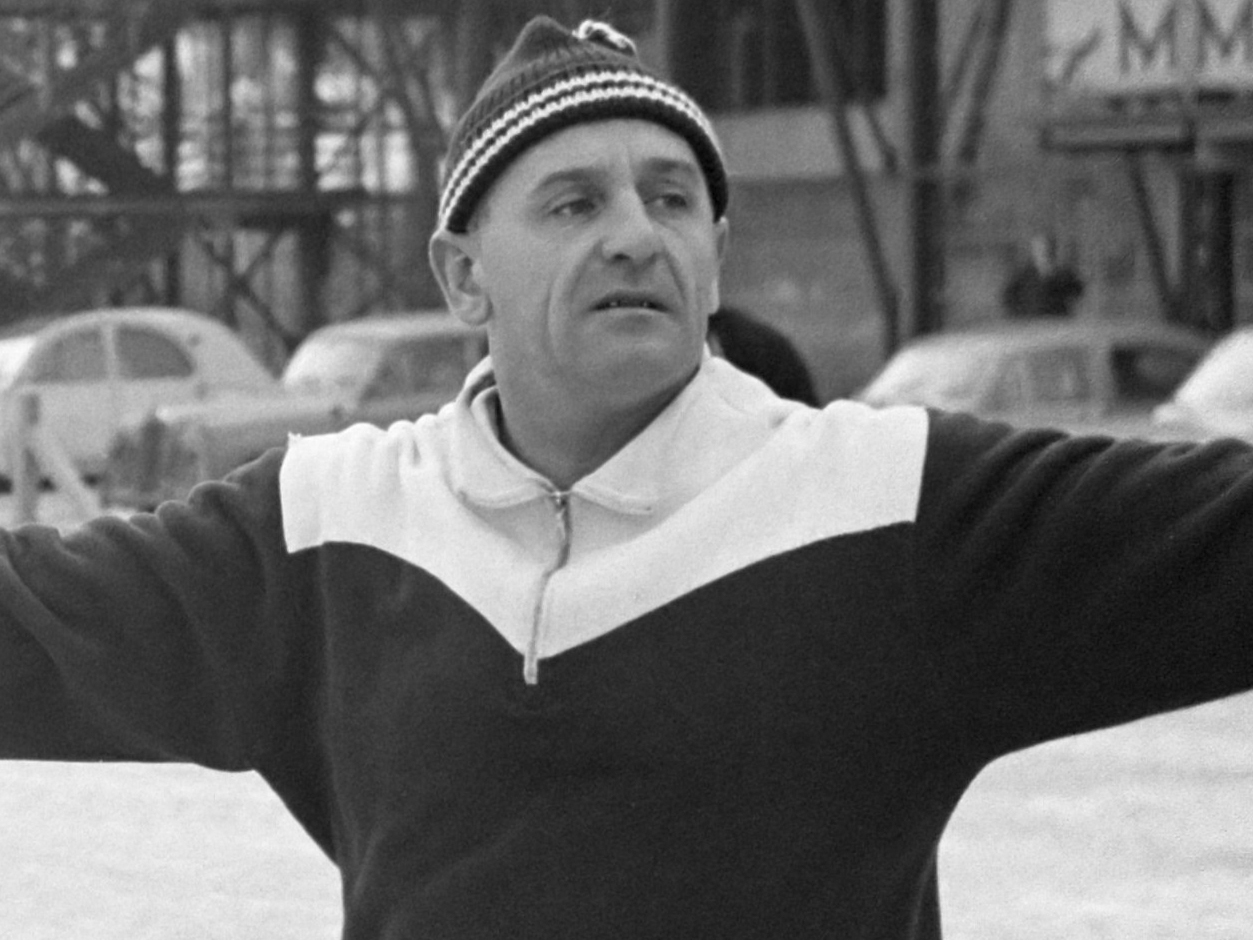
- Fuchs in 1963

Personal information
- Date of birth: 25 November 1915
- Place of birth: Austria
- Date of death: May 1990 (aged 74)

Managerial career
- Years: Team
- 1952–1953: ADO Den Haag
- 1954: BVC Rotterdam
- 1957–1958: Holland Sport
- 1959–1960: Holland Sport
- 1960–1961: Blauw-Wit Amsterdam
- 1961–1963: Feyenoord
- 1963–1964: Blauw-Wit Amsterdam
- 1964–1965: Belenenses
- 1965–1966: Hamborn 07
- 1966–1967: Sturm Graz

Franz Fuchs (25 November 1915 – May 1990) was an Austrian professional football manager. He coached ADO Den Haag, BVC Rotterdam, Holland Sport, Blauw-Wit Amsterdam, Feijenoord, Blauw-Wit Amsterdam, SK Sturm Graz, Belenenses and Hamborn 07.
