= Keith Spurgeon =

English footballer and manager

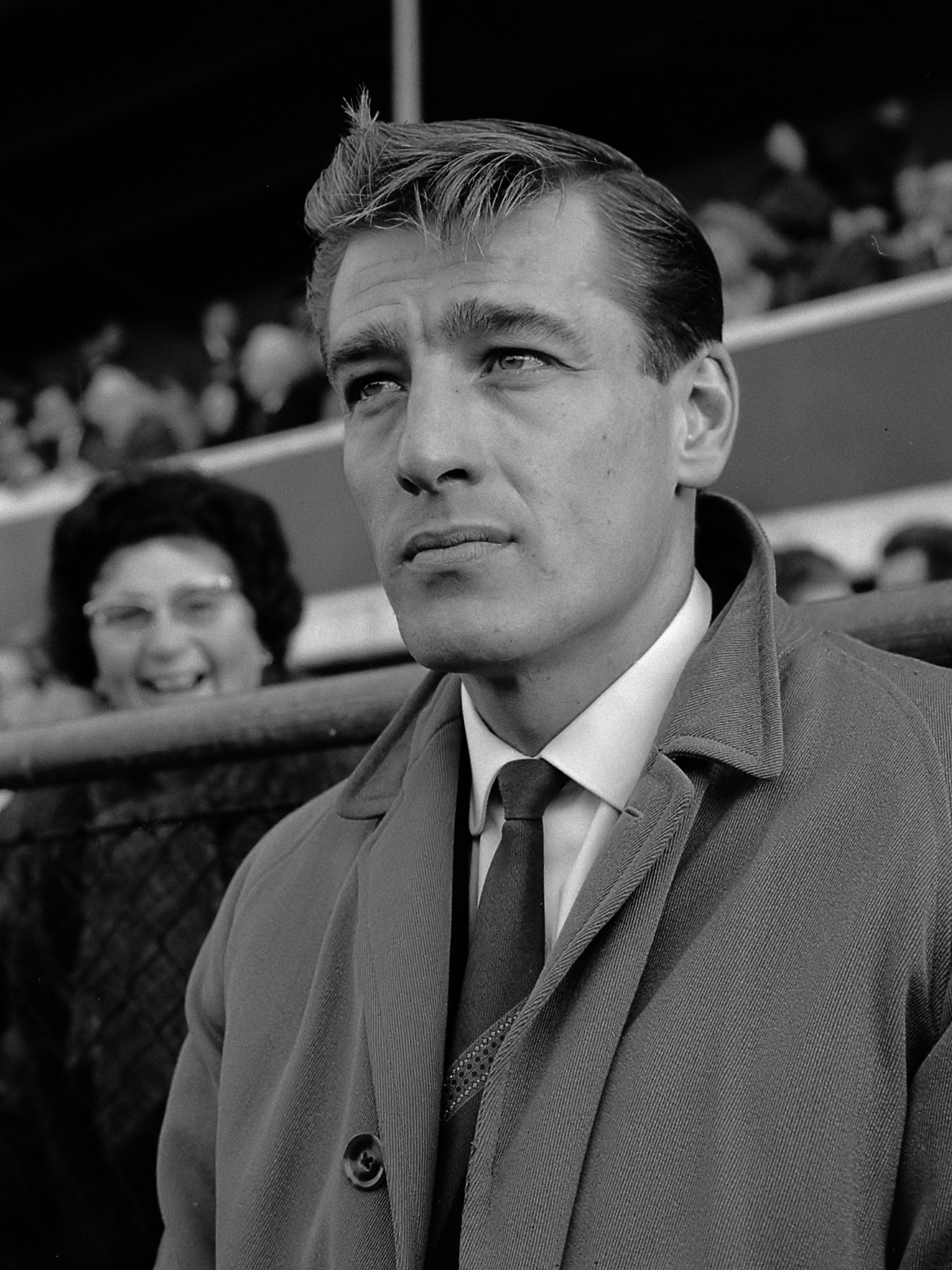
- Spurgeon in 1964

Personal information
- Full name: Keith Matthew Spurgeon
- Date of birth: 29 August 1932
- Place of birth: Borehamwood, England
- Date of death: December 1984 (aged 52)
- Place of death: Sweden
- Position: Defender

Youth career
- Tottenham Hotspur

Senior career*
Years	Team	Apps	(Gls)
1952–1953	Margate	2	(0)
1953–1955	Leytonstone		
1955–1956	Margate	0	(0)
1956–1957	Folkestone Town		
1957–1960	Herne Bay		
1960	Snowdown Colliery Welfare		
1960–?	Clapton		

Managerial career
- 1961–1962: Ajax
- 1962–1963: Blauw-Wit Amsterdam
- 1963–1964: Heracles Almelo
- 1964–1966: Blauw-Wit Amsterdam
- 1966–1967: AGOVV
- 1967–1968: Libya
- 1968: Dallas Tornado
- 1969–1970: KV Mechelen
- 1970: Lierse
- 1975: AIK
- 1977–1978: APOEL
- 1979–1980: Landskrona
- * Club domestic league appearances and goals

Keith Matthew Spurgeon (29 August 1932 – December 1984) was an English football player and manager.

== Playing career ==
Spurgeon played for Tottenham Hotspur, Margate, Leytonstone, Folkestone Town, Herne Bay and Snowdown Colliery Welfare. In October 1960 he was hired as a coach by Clapton, where he also had been used as a player to cover for injuries, on at least one occasion.

== Coaching career ==
Spurgeon was manager of Dutch clubs Ajax from 1961 to 1962, Blauw-Wit Amsterdam between 1962 and 1963, and again between 1964 and 1965. He also managed Heracles Almelo from 1963 to 1964, and AGOVV and he later coached the Libyan national side, the Dallas Tornado of the North American Soccer League, Belgian side K.V. Mechelen Swedish side AIK, Cypriot side APOEL, and Landskrona, also of Sweden.

== Personal life ==
Keith was born in Borehamwood, the son of Phyllis Edith Brighton and Albert Edward Spurgeon. He was married to Sylvia May Goldsmith.

He died in Sweden in 1984, from motor neurone disease.

His son Kevin Spurgeon became a golfer.
