= Pim Bekkering =

Dutch footballer (1931–2014)

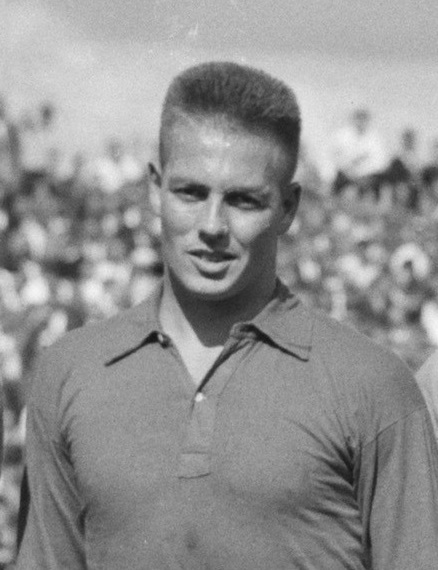

Personal information
- Date of birth: 9 August 1931
- Place of birth: Amsterdam, Netherlands
- Date of death: 25 February 2014 (aged 82)
- Place of death: Helmond, Netherlands
- Position: Goalkeeper

Youth career
- RKAVIC

Senior career*
Years	Team	Apps	(Gls)
1956–1957	't Gooi	28	(0)
1957–1966	PSV	121	(0)
1967–1969	Eindhoven	30	(0)
Total		179	(0)
- * Club domestic league appearances and goals as of 1 March 2014 ‡ National team caps and goals as of 1 March 2014

Pim Bekkering (9 August 1931 – 25 February 2014) was a Dutch football player.

== Club career ==
Nicknamed de Kat (the Cat), Bekkering made his professional debut for then Tweede Divisie side HVV 't Gooi in the 1956-57 season. He left them a year later for PSV for whom he would play 121 league games in 10 seasons. He was replaced in the PSV goal by Gert Bals, spending a large part of his PSV career as the second goalkeeper. Between 1957 and 1967 he played 121 games for PSV with whom he became national champion in 1963, after which he played with EVV until 1968. His nickname was "The Cat."

== Retirement and death ==
Bekkering used to work for Philips. He died in February 2014.
