= Charlie Rance =

English footballer (1889–1966)

Personal information
- Full name: Charles Stanley Rance
- Date of birth: 28 February 1889
- Place of birth: Bow, England
- Date of death: 29 December 1966 (aged 77)
- Place of death: Worthing, West Sussex, England
- Position: Centre half

Senior career*
Years	Team	Apps	(Gls)
????–1910	Clapton		
1910–1920	Tottenham Hotspur	103	(0)
1920–1921	Derby County	23	(0)
1922–1923	Queens Park Rangers	13	(0)
1924	Guildford United	1	(0)

Managerial career
- 1924: 't Gooi
- * Club domestic league appearances and goals

Charles Stanley Rance (28 February 1889 – 29 December 1966) was an English professional footballer who played for Clapton, Tottenham Hotspur, Derby County, Queens Park Rangers and Guildford United.

== Football career ==
Rance won two FA Amateur Cup winners medals with Isthmian League club Clapton, in 1907 and 1909. In the latter final playing as a centre-forward, he scored a hat-trick and played alongside Walter Tull in the Clapton forward line.

In 1910, Rance joined Tottenham from Clapton where he played as a centre half. He played a total of 110 matches and scored one goal for the club in all competitions. Rance moved to Derby County in 1920 where he featured in 23 matches before joining Queens Park Rangers in 1922. He played in 13 matches for the club and ended his career at Guildford United.

In 1924 he went to Hilversum to coach 't Gooi.
