= Rinus Schaap =

Dutch footballer (1922–2006)

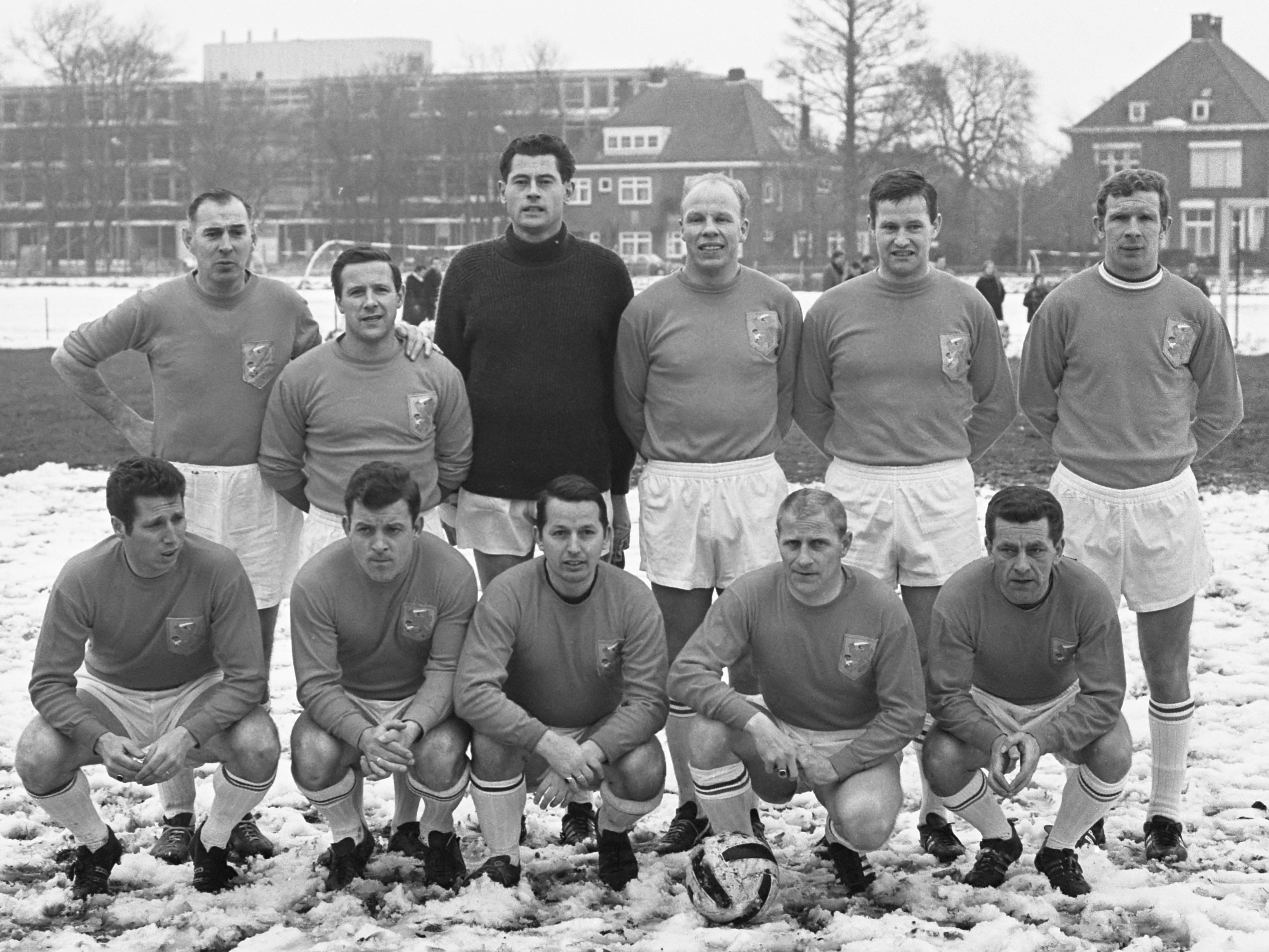
- Schaap in 1969, standing left

Personal information
- Full name: Marinus Schaap
- Date of birth: 22 February 1922
- Place of birth: Hilversum, Netherlands
- Date of death: 5 June 2006 (aged 84)
- Place of death: Hilversum, Netherlands
- Position: Forward

Senior career*
Years	Team	Apps	(Gls)
1947–1950	't Gooi		
1950–1952	Toulouse		
1952–1954	RC Paris	36	(0)
1954–1957	't Gooi	?	(12)
1957–1960	SC Enschede	95	(4)

International career
1948–1956	Netherlands	13	(1)
- * Club domestic league appearances and goals

Marinus "Rinus" Schaap (22 February 1922 – 5 June 2006) was a Dutch footballer. He played in thirteen matches for the Netherlands national football team between 1948 and 1956. He was also part of the Dutch squad for the 1948 Summer Olympics, but he did not play in any matches.
