= Martin Koeman =

Dutch footballer (1938–2013)

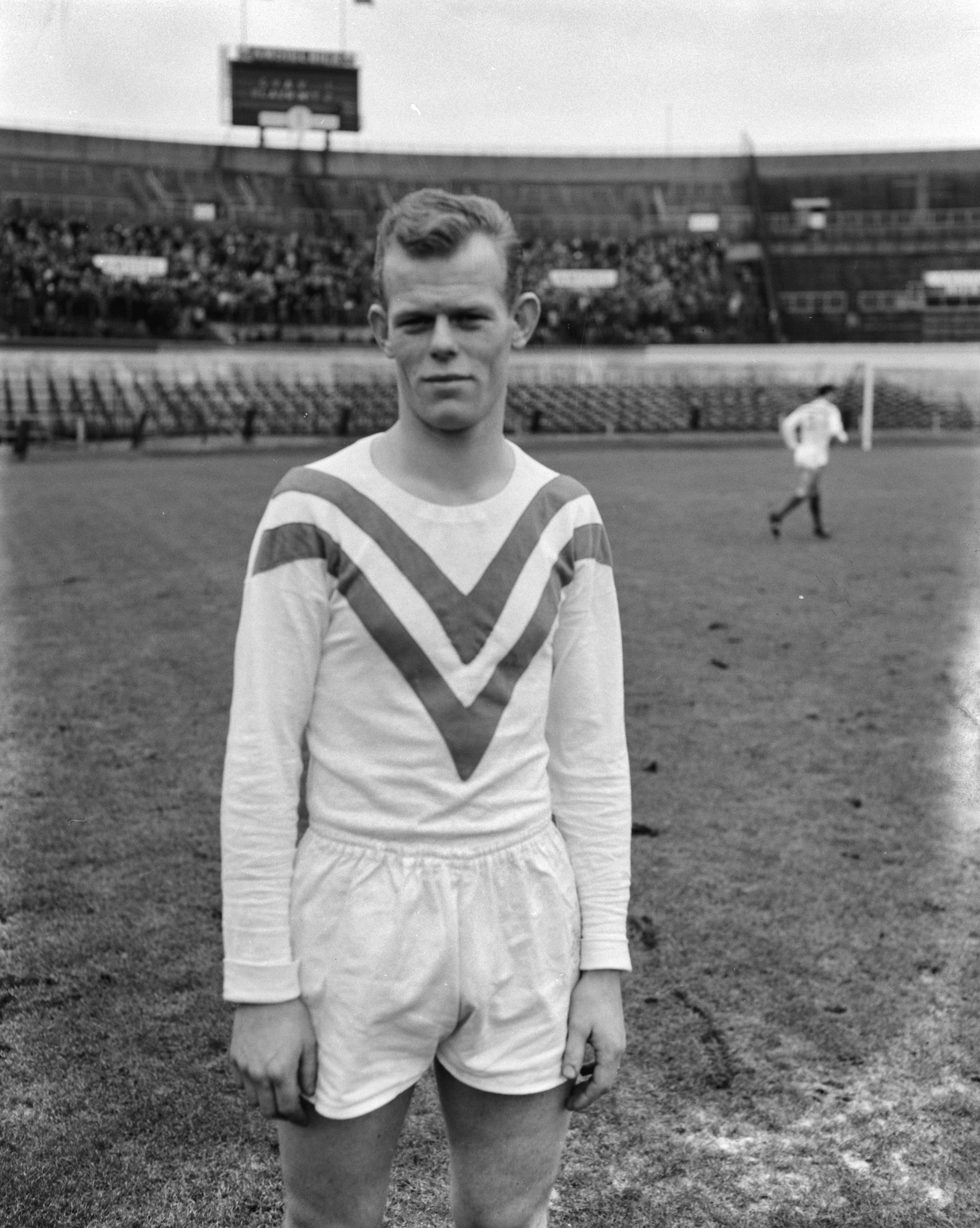
- Koeman with Blauw-Wit in 1962

Personal information
- Full name: Martinus Cornelis Koeman
- Date of birth: 26 July 1938
- Place of birth: Purmerend, Netherlands
- Date of death: 18 December 2013 (aged 75)
- Place of death: Leeuwarden, Netherlands
- Position: Centre-back

Youth career
- 1953–1957: Purmersteijn

Senior career*
Years	Team	Apps	(Gls)
1957–1960	KFC		
1960–1963	Blauw-Wit	56	(23)
1963–1971	GVAV	250	(23)
1971–1973	FC Groningen	52	(4)
1973–1974	SC Heerenveen	37	(1)
Total		395	(51)

International career
1964	Netherlands	1	(0)
- * Club domestic league appearances and goals

Martinus Cornelis Koeman (26 July 1938 – 18 December 2013) was a Dutch footballer who played as a centre-back.

== Biography ==
Koeman played professional football with KFC of Koog aan de Zaan from 1955 to 1960, Blauw-Wit Amsterdam from 1960 to 1963, GVAV/Groningen from 1963 to 1973 and SC Heerenveen until his retirement. He was selected regularly for the Netherlands national team but only played one match, against Austria on 12 April 1964.

Koeman is the father of former Dutch football players and current football trainers Ronald Koeman and Erwin Koeman. On 18 December 2013, at the age 75, Koeman died from cardiac arrest.
