= Frans Hombörg =

Dutch footballer

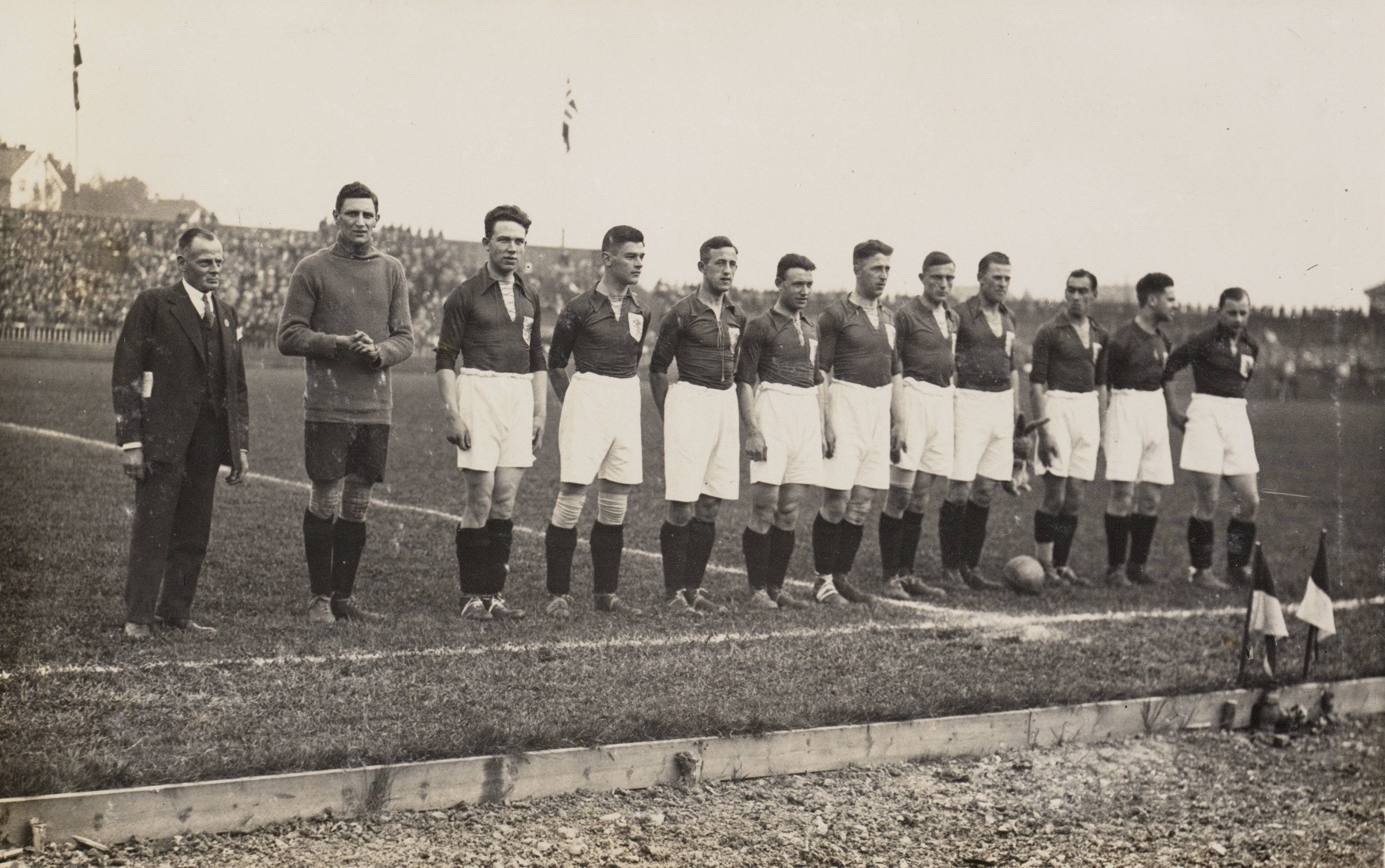
- Hombörg (third from right) in the Oranje

Personal information
- Full name: Franciscus Hombörg
- Date of birth: 11 June 1898
- Place of birth: Amsterdam, Netherlands
- Date of death: 17 December 1943 (aged 45)
- Place of death: Amsterdam, Netherlands
- Position: Outside left

Senior career*
Years	Team	Apps	(Gls)
1924–1931	Blauw-Wit		

International career
1929	Netherlands	2	(0)
- * Club domestic league appearances and goals

Frans Hombörg (11 June 1898 – 17 December 1943) was a Dutch footballer. He played in two matches for the Netherlands national football team in 1929.

Hombörg died in 1943 after a short illness.
