= Hugh Edmonds =

Scottish footballer

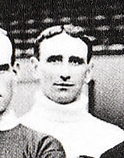

Personal information
- Full name: Hugh Edmonds
- Date of birth: 1877
- Place of birth: Chryston, Scotland
- Height: 5 ft 10 in (1.78 m)
- Position: Goalkeeper

Senior career*
Years	Team	Apps	(Gls)
–	Ashfield		
1901–1907	Hamilton Academical	125	(0)
1902	→ Celtic	0	(0)
1907–1908	Distillery		
1908–1909	Linfield		
1909–1911	Bolton Wanderers	10	(0)
1911–1912	Manchester United	43	(0)
1912–1913	Glenavon		
1913–?	Distillery		

International career
	Irish League XI	1	(0)

Managerial career
- 1912–1913: Glenavon (player-manager)
- * Club domestic league appearances and goals

Hugh Edmonds (1877 – unknown) was a Scottish footballer who played as a goalkeeper.

== Career ==
Born in Chryston, Lanarkshire, Edmonds began his career with Hamilton Academical, where he was loaned to Celtic for a match in the one-off 1902 British League Cup, then won three Lanarkshire Cups and the 1903–04 Scottish Division Two title, before moving across the Irish Sea to Belfast in 1907 to play for Distillery. He then played for Linfield before joining English Second Division champions Bolton Wanderers in October 1909. He played four times for Bolton in the First Division in 1909–10, but the club finished bottom of the league in 20th place and were relegated. He made six more appearances in 1910–11, but spent most of the season in the reserve team.

In February 1911, he moved to Manchester United as cover for the injured Harry Moger. He made his debut in a 3–1 win at home to Bristol City on 11 February. With Edmonds in goal, Manchester United lost only two of their final 13 league matches and conceded just 12 goals as they went on to clinch their second league title by a single point over runners-up Aston Villa. He claimed his second piece of silverware with the club at the start of the following season as Manchester United beat Swindon Town 8–4 in the 1911 FA Charity Shield, and retained his place in the team for much of the 1911–12 season; aside from five appearances for Moger (one in a 3–1 win over Aston Villa on 25 November and four more at the end of the season) and two for Ezra Royals (against Liverpool on 23 March and Aston Villa on 30 March), Edmonds played in every match. However, the team suffered a slump in form compared to the previous season and finished in 13th place.

At the end of the season, he took the job of player-manager at Glenavon back in Ireland, before returning to Distillery a year later.

During his time in Ireland, Edmonds earned one cap for the Irish League XI.
