= Herman van Raalte =

Dutch footballer

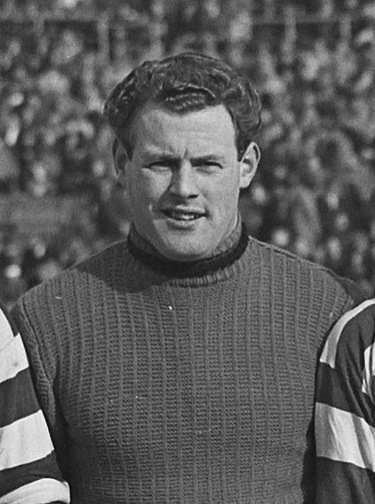

Personal information
- Full name: Herman van Raalte
- Date of birth: 8 April 1921
- Place of birth: Hengelo, Netherlands
- Date of death: 3 April 2013 (aged 91)
- Place of death: Amsterdam, Netherlands
- Position: Goalkeeper

Senior career*
Years	Team	Apps	(Gls)
- HVV Hengelo
1942–1954	Blauw-Wit		
1954–1957	B.V.C. Amsterdam		
1957–1959	Blauw-Wit		
1959–1960	Leeuwarden		

International career^{‡}
1948	Netherlands	1	(0)
- * Club domestic league appearances and goals as of 5 April 2013 ‡ National team caps and goals as of 5 April 2013

Herman van Raalte (8 April 1921 – 3 April 2013) was a Dutch football player.

== Club career ==
Van Raalte played for hometown club HVV Hengelo in the 1930s and 40s before joining Amsterdam side Blauw-Wit during World War II. With Blauw-Wit he lost the 1949–50 Netherlands Football League Championship final. He also played for B.V.C. Amsterdam and V.V. Leeuwarden.

== International career ==
Van Raalte earned his one and only cap for the Netherlands in a November 1948 friendly match against Belgium.

== Retirement and death ==
After his football career, he became a textile merchant. Van Raalte died of a bacterial infection after hip surgery on 3 April 2013 at the age of 91. He was the then oldest living former Dutch international footballer.
