= Ferry Petterson =

Dutch footballer

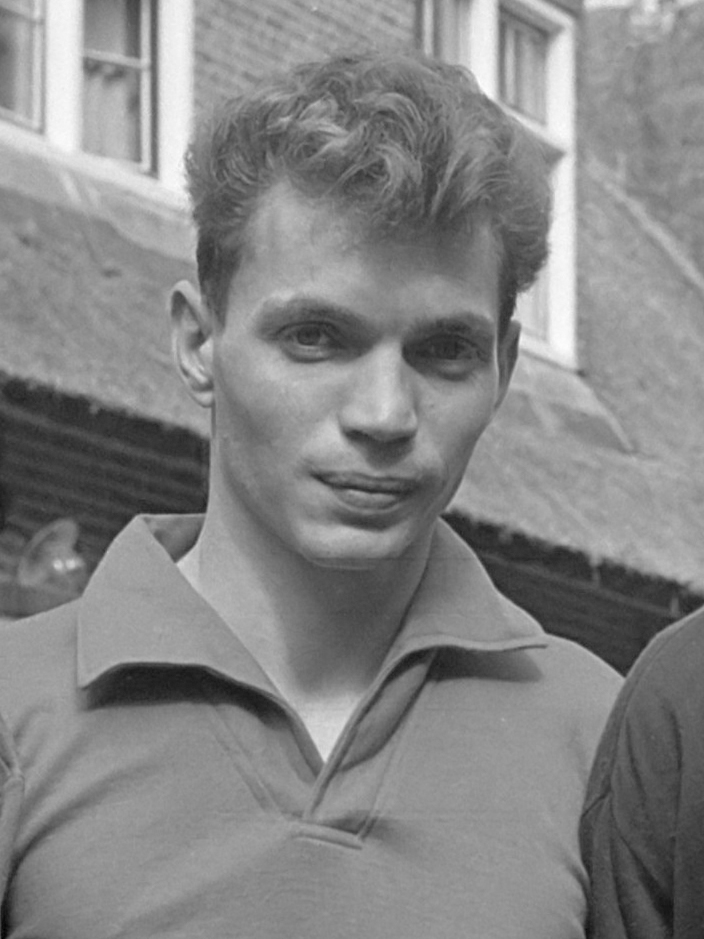
- Patterson in 1962

Personal information
- Date of birth: 28 August 1938
- Date of death: 27 November 2000 (aged 62)

International career
Years	Team	Apps	(Gls)
1962	Netherlands	2	(0)

Ferry Petterson (28 August 1938 – 27 November 2000) was a Dutch footballer. He played in two matches for the Netherlands national football team in 1962.
