= Jan Schindeler =

Dutch footballer

Personal information
- Date of birth: 18 December 1892
- Date of death: 7 December 1963 (aged 70)

International career
Years	Team	Apps	(Gls)
1925	Netherlands	1	(0)

Jan Schindeler (18 December 1892 – 7 December 1963) was a Dutch footballer. He played in one match for the Netherlands national football team in 1925.
