= Sam Burton =

English footballer (1926–2020)

Personal information
- Full name: Samuel Burton
- Date of birth: 10 November 1926
- Place of birth: Swindon, England
- Date of death: 8 October 2020 (aged 93)
- Position: Goalkeeper

Senior career*
| Years | Team | Apps | (Gls) |
| 1945–1961 | Swindon Town | 463 | (0) |
- * Club domestic league appearances and goals

Samuel Burton (10 November 1926 – 8 October 2020) was an English professional footballer who played his entire career as a goalkeeper for Swindon Town, making 463 appearances in the Football League and 509 in all first-team competitions. Only John Trollope, Maurice Owen and Fraser Digby played more times for the club.

As of October 2018, Burton was still making appearances at Swindon Town's Former Players' Association events, at the age of 91.

He died in October 2020 at the age of 93. He had been diagnosed with cancer 12 weeks prior and suffered from dementia.
