= Wim van Dolder =

Dutch footballer

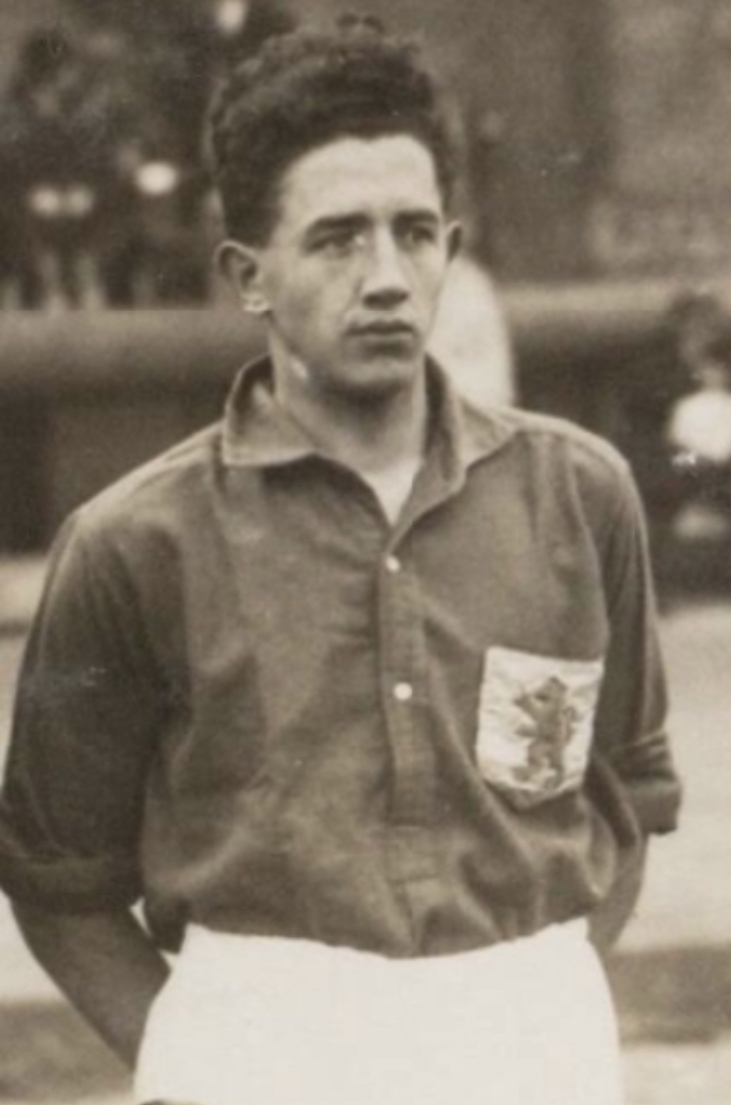
- Wim van Dolder in 1928

Personal information
- Full name: Willem Christiaan van Dolder
- Date of birth: 11 April 1903
- Place of birth: Breukelen, Netherlands
- Date of death: 13 February 1969 (aged 65)
- Place of death: Arnhem, Netherlands
- Position: Defender

Senior career*
Years	Team	Apps	(Gls)
1927–1930	't Gooi		

International career
1928–1929	Netherlands	3	(0)
- * Club domestic league appearances and goals

Wim van Dolder (11 April 1903 – 13 February 1969) was a Dutch footballer. He played in three matches for the Netherlands national football team from 1928 to 1929.

== Club career ==
Hailing from 's-Graveland, van Dolder played his entire career for HVV 't Gooi. Due to a knee injury, he had to quit football and opened a bicycle shop in Bussum but remained loyal to ’t Gooi and, arriving on his bicycle, visited every home game of them.

== International career ==
Van Dolder was the first 't Gooi player to don the Oranje shirt. His national team debut came on their 100th match in history.

== Personal life ==
He married Emma Wilhelmina Moen in 1931.
