= Tom Davies (footballer, born 1882) =

English footballer

Personal information
- Full name: Thomas Osborne Davies
- Date of birth: 27 March 1882
- Place of birth: Swindon, England
- Date of death: 1967 (aged 84–85)
- Height: 5 ft 7 in (1.70 m)
- Position: Outside right

Youth career
- Swindon Swifts

Senior career*
Years	Team	Apps	(Gls)
1900–1903	Swindon Town	73	(5)
1903–1906	Nottingham Forest	39	(1)
1906–1908	Reading		
1908–1909	Salisbury City		
1909–1910	Southampton	8	(1)
- * Club domestic league appearances and goals

Thomas Osborne Davies (27 March 1882 – 1967) was an English professional footballer who played as an outside forward for various clubs between 1900 and 1910. His career started in the Southern League with his hometown club Swindon Town, before spending three years in the Football League First Division with Nottingham Forest. He then returned to the Southern League with Reading and, later, Southampton before a broken leg ended his career.

== Football career ==
Davies was born in Swindon and played his youth football with Swindon Swifts before joining Swindon Town. He made his first-team debut playing at inside-right in an FA Cup match at Bristol East on 3 November 1900. The match was drawn 1–1, but Swindon won the replay 5–0, with Davies scoring the first goal. He retained his place in the side, scoring in each of the next two matches in the FA Cup, against Staple Hill. He also played regularly in both the Western League and the Southern League. At the end of his first season with Swindon's first-team, the club finished at the bottom of the table and had to play-off against Brentford to retain their First Division status.

During the next season, Davies switched his position to outside-right as Swindon again finished at the bottom of the table and had to play-off (against Fulham) to avoid relegation. Davies remained with Swindon until 1903, with his final match coming on the opening day of the 1903–04 season. In his three years at the County Ground, Davies made a total of 109 first-team appearances, scoring 14 goals.

He then moved to Nottingham Forest, of the Football League First Division, where he stayed until the end of the 1905–06 season, when Forest were relegated to the Second Division. In his three years at Forest, he made 39 league appearances, scoring once. Following relegation, he spent two years back in the Southern League First Division with Reading before dropping down to the Second Division with Salisbury City in 1908.

In April 1909, he was invited to The Dell for a trial which led to a permanent move to Southampton. He made his debut for the "Saints" in the opening match of the 1909–10 season, a 1–0 victory over Plymouth Argyle. Described as a "dapper little striker" he soon became a crowd favourite and played in the first six matches, scoring once. He then lost his place at outside-right to John Bainbridge who had returned from injury. Davies spent the rest of the season in the reserves, making only two further first-team appearances.

In March 1910, he broke his leg in a reserve-team match at Eastleigh Athletic which brought his football career to a close.

== Family ==
Davies' younger brother, Bertie was also a player with Swindon Town, for whom he made 276 first-team appearances before becoming assistant manager to Louis Page in 1949.
