= Tober (surname) =

Tober is a surname. Notable people with the surname include:

- Gene Tober, American soccer player
- Michał Tober (born 1975), Polish politician
- Otto Tober (1882–1964), German cinematographer
- Ronnie Tober (born 1945), Dutch singer

== See also ==
- Tobey
