= Feike Lietzen =

Dutch footballer

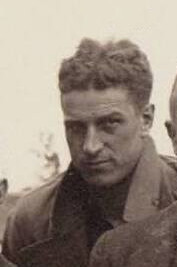
- Lietzen (1921)

Personal information
- Date of birth: 7 October 1893
- Date of death: 28 May 1970 (aged 76)

International career
Years	Team	Apps	(Gls)
1922	Netherlands	1	(0)

Feike Lietzen (7 October 1893 – 28 May 1970) was a Dutch footballer. He played in one match for the Netherlands national football team in 1922.
