= Kevin Baddeley =

English footballer

Personal information
- Date of birth: 12 March 1962 (age 64)
- Position: Full back

Youth career
- 1979–1980: Bristol City

Senior career*
| Years | Team | Apps | (Gls) |
| 1980–1981 | Bristol City | | |
| 1981–1985 | Swindon Town | 95 | (2) |
| 1985–?? | Cheltenham Town | | |
| ?? | Wealdstone | | |
- * Club domestic league appearances and goals

Kevin Baddeley (born 12 March 1962) is an English former football full back.

He began his footballing career as an apprentice with Bristol City, he progressed into the first team in 1980 and signed a professional contract with the club. He was given a free transfer to Swindon Town in June 1981 and went on to make over 110 appearances in league and cup games for the team.

Swindon released him in May 1985 following Lou Macari's appointment as team manager and he signed to Cheltenham Town. Later in his career he played for Wealdstone.
