= Kees Slot =

Dutch footballer

Personal information
- Date of birth: 14 May 1909
- Place of birth: Amsterdam
- Date of death: 3 December 1962 (aged 53)
- Place of death: Amsterdam

International career
Years	Team	Apps	(Gls)
1940	Netherlands	1	(0)

Kees Slot (14 May 1909 – 3 December 1962) was a Dutch footballer. He played in one match for the Netherlands national football team in 1940.
