= Eb van der Kluft =

Dutch footballer (1889–1970)

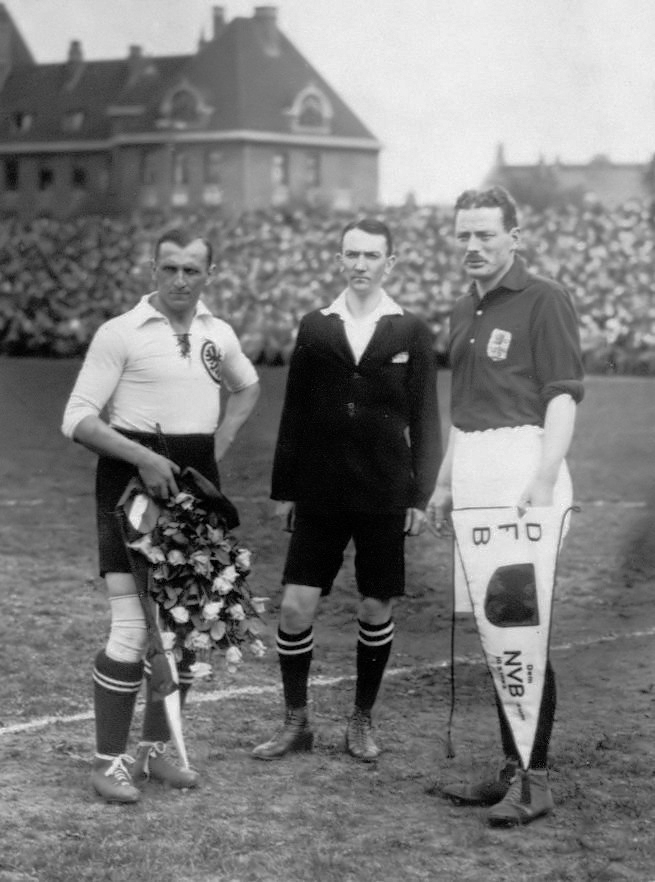

Personal information
- Date of birth: 23 May 1889
- Place of birth: Amsterdam, Netherlands
- Date of death: 5 July 1970 (aged 81)
- Place of death: Amsterdam, Netherlands

International career
| Years | Team | Apps | (Gls) |
- Netherlands

Eb van der Kluft (23 May 1889 – 5 July 1970) was a Dutch footballer. He played in four matches for the Netherlands national football team between 1921 and 1923.
