= Bob Jefferson =

English footballer player and coach (1882–1966)

Personal information
- Full name: Robert William Jefferson
- Date of birth: June 1882
- Place of birth: Sunderland, England
- Date of death: July 1966 (aged 84)
- Place of death: London, England
- Position: Outside right

Youth career
- Sunderland Royal Rovers

Senior career*
Years	Team	Apps	(Gls)
1904–1906	Bradford City	30	(6)
1906–1908	Leeds City	17	(5)
1908–1922	Swindon Town	274	(67)
Total		321	(78)

Managerial career
- 1923–1924: HFC
- 1924–1925: Vitesse Arnhem
- 1925–1926: Vitesse Arnhem, Tubantia
- 1926–1927: Vitesse Arnhem
- 1927–1928: 't Gooi
- 1928–1929: 't Gooi, Eindhoven
- 1929–1931: Velocitas
- 1931–1932: Velocitas, HSC
- 1932–1933: Velocitas, FVC
- 1933–1934: Velocitas
- 1934–1938: Velox
- * Club domestic league appearances and goals

Robert William Jefferson (June 1882 – July 1966) was an English professional football player and manager.

== Early life ==
Robert William Jefferson was born in Sunderland, Tyne and Wear, Tyne and Wear in 1882. He left school to join the Royal Navy, before deserting after a few weeks to become an apprentice moulder at a foundry back in Sunderland. At this time, he began playing junior football with local team Sunderland Royal Rovers, before becoming a professional footballer. Jefferson served as a corporal in the Royal Air Force during the First World War.

== Career ==
Jefferson played primarily as an outside right, but could play at any forward or wing position.

He began his professional career at Bradford City in November 1904, scoring six goals in 30 appearances in the Football League over the next two seasons. Jefferson joined local rivals Leeds City in May 1906, scoring on his debut against Leicester Fosse. By May 1908, Jefferson had moved to Swindon Town along with former-Leeds players Harry Kay and Jack Lavery. Jefferson was to remain with the Wiltshire club for the next 14 years, despite his career being disrupted by the First World War. At Swindon, Jefferson made 356 appearances in all competitions, scoring 82 goals. His spell at Swindon included an appearance in the 1911 FA Charity Shield, and eleven appearances for the Southern Football League representative team. Jefferson also scored in Swindon's first ever game in the Football League, in a 9–1 victory against Luton Town. In total, Jefferson made 321 appearances in the Football League and the Southern Football League between 1904 and 1922, scoring 78 goals.

In May 1922 Jefferson joined non-League team Bath City, where he ended his playing career one year later.

== Coaching career ==
After retiring as a player, Jefferson went to the Netherlands to work as a coach. He started in Haarlem with HFC. After his one-year spell at the oldest footballclub of the Netherlands he left for Arnhem to coach local team Vitesse Arnhem from 1924 to 1927. During this time he also coached Tubantia from Hengelo from mid February until the first of June 1926 in order to prepare them for the promotion competition after which he returned to Vitesse. Though, as expected, he became champions with Tubantia, they eventually did not win the promotion competition. He then went to Hilversum to coach 't Gooi for two years. In the last of his two years in Hilversum he also coached Eindhoven. In 1929 he went to Groningen to coach Velocitas. During his time here he also coached HSC from nearby Hoogezand and FVC from faraway Leeuwarden. With Velocitas he won the Dutch FA Cup in 1934. After this success he left Velocitas to coach what was to be his last club in the Netherlands: Velox where he was let go in 1938.
