= Ferry Mesman =

Dutch footballer

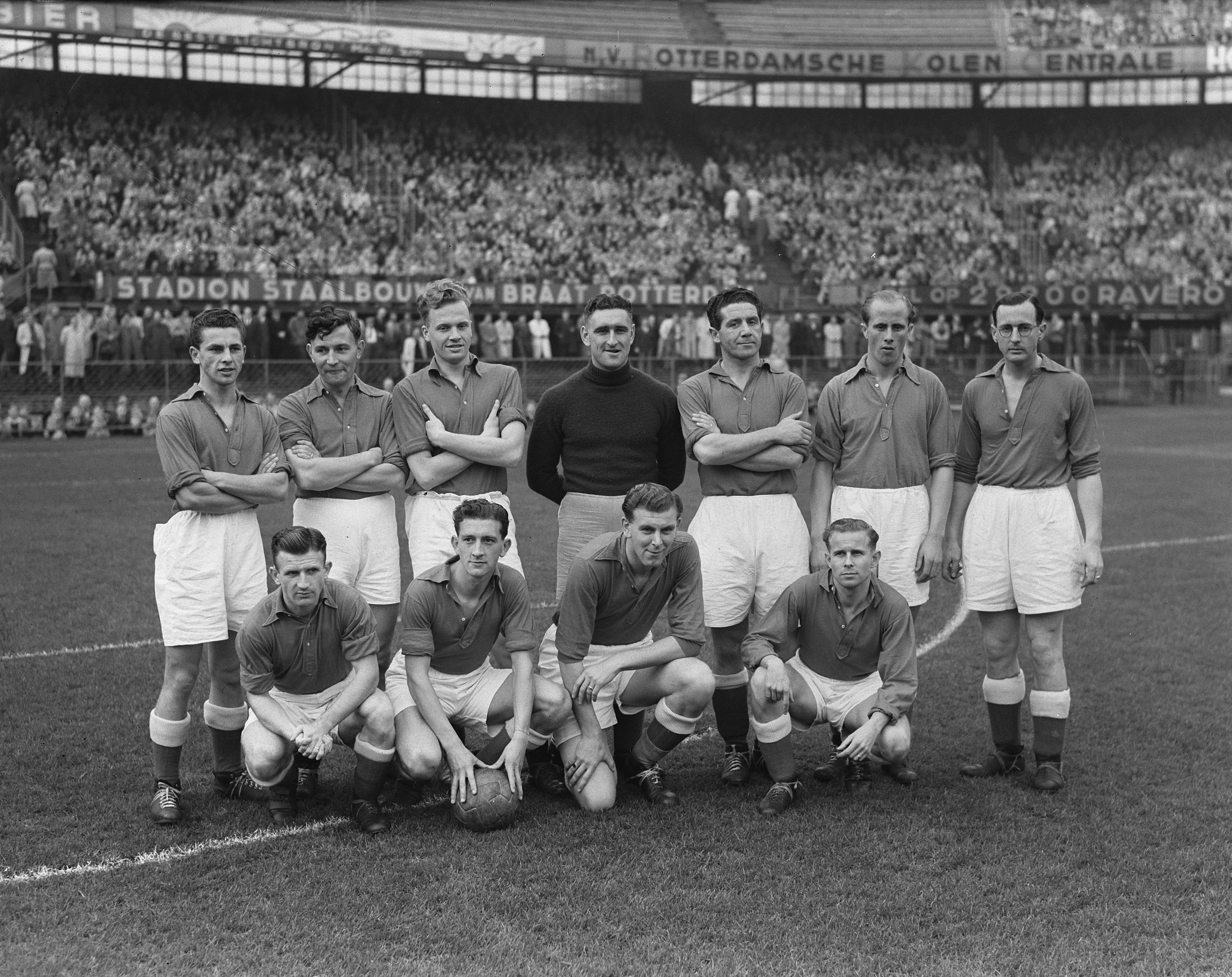
- Mesman (standing, 2nd from right) in the Netherlands football team, 1950)

Personal information
- Date of birth: 12 February 1925
- Date of death: 20 October 2003 (aged 78)

International career
Years	Team	Apps	(Gls)
1950	Netherlands	1	(0)

Ferry Mesman (12 February 1925 – 20 October 2003) was a Dutch footballer. He played in one match for the Netherlands national football team in 1950.

In the early 1950s, Mesman played for FC Blauw Wit from Amsterdam, with whom he won the top division in the 1949/50 season and finished second in the final round of the Dutch championship behind Limburgia Brunssum; the following season, Blauw-Wit repeated the championship and reached the championship finals again. Mesman later turned professional and played 104 games in the Eredivisie from 1956 to 1960, the first two years for BVC Amsterdam and, after the merger of BVC and Door Wilskracht Sterk (DWS), for DWS/A.
