= Keith Morgan (footballer) =

English footballer

Personal information
- Date of birth: 19 February 1940 (age 86)
- Place of birth: Trowbridge, England
- Position: Wing half

Senior career*
Years	Team	Apps	(Gls)
- Westbury United
1958–1967	Swindon Town	325	(6)
- Trowbridge Town
- * Club domestic league appearances and goals

Keith Morgan (born 19 February 1940) is an English former footballer, who played in the Football League for Swindon Town.
