= Billy Silto =

English footballer

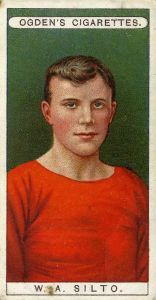
- Cigarette card of William Silto

Personal information
- Full name: William Alfred Silto
- Date of birth: 1 May 1883
- Place of birth: Washington, County Durham, England
- Position: Centre half

Senior career*
| Years | Team | Apps | (Gls) |
- Washington
- Hebburn Argyle
| 1904–1909 | Barnsley | 92 | (3) |
| 1909–1920 | Swindon Town | 239 | (5) |
- * Club domestic league appearances and goals

William Alfred Silto (1 May 1883 – after 1919) was an English footballer who played at centre half. He played in the Football League for Barnsley and in the Southern League for Swindon Town.

After injury caused a £1000 transfer to Aston Villa to fall through, Silto joined Swindon during the summer of 1909, after being released by Barnsley, who suspected he was injury-prone. Had the transfer gone through he would have been the first British football player to have been sold for more than £1000. He went on to make well over 200 appearances for Swindon over the following eleven years - and without the interruption of the First World War, it would have been far more.

A strong-tackling, energetic half-back with incredible stamina, Silto was part of one of the most successful sides in the Town's history, winning two Southern League championship medals, the Dubonnet Cup, and also reaching the FA Cup semi-finals twice. In the 1912 semi-final replay against Barnsley, Swindon were awarded a penalty, and, with regular penalty-taker Billy Tout out through injury, Silto stepped up to take the kick, eager to score against his former club. He was stopped in his tracks by captain Peter Chambers, who told Silto, "you don't take penalties, Billy", and handed the responsibility to a reluctant Archie Bown. Bown missed the kick, and Barnsley went on to win the tie 1–0.

Such were Silto's performances in the Swindon team, that he was recognised as the understudy to the England half-back Billy Wedlock for many seasons, and though he joined up with the England squad on many occasions, the only appearances he made were on an unofficial tour of South Africa in 1910.

After retirement, Silto settled in the Swindon area where the sporting heritage would continue with his son Joe Silto playing and later captaining England at table tennis playing against notable world names including 5 times World Champion Viktor Barna, who is widely considered to be one of the greatest players of all time.

Like former Swindon Town teammate Harold Fleming, a street was named 'Silto Court' in the town in recognition of the international sporting achievements by both generations of the family.
