= Tober Weston =

English footballer

Personal information
- Full name: Albert Mark Weston
- Date of birth: 26 February 1888
- Place of birth: Calne, England
- Position: Defender

Senior career*
| Years | Team | Apps | (Gls) |
- Calne Town
| 1912–1929 | Swindon Town | 333 | (9) |
- * Club domestic league appearances and goals

Albert "Tober" Mark Weston was an English professional footballer. He appeared in the English Football League for Swindon Town and in 2002 was named as the club's 95th all-time great.
