= Freddie Wheatcroft =

English footballer

Personal information
- Full name: Frederick George Wheatcroft
- Date of birth: 1882
- Place of birth: Alfreton, Derbyshire, England
- Date of death: 26 November 1917 (aged 35)
- Place of death: Bourlon, France
- Position: Centre forward

Senior career*
Years	Team	Apps	(Gls)
- Alfreton Town
1903–1904	Derby County	4	(3)
1904–1905	Swindon Town	14	(5)
1905	Derby County	1	(1)
1905–1906	Swindon Town	19	(4)
1906	Fulham		
1906–1908	Derby County	20	(4)
1908–1909	Reading		
1909–1917	Swindon Town	183	(77)

International career
1906	England Amateurs	1	(1)
- * Club domestic league appearances and goals

Frederick George Wheatcroft (1882 – 26 November 1917) was an English professional footballer who played during the first quarter of the 20th century. During his career he played for the original Alfreton Town, Derby County, Fulham, Reading but is best remembered for his spells at Swindon Town. He scored on his only appearance for the England amateur national team.

== Derby County ==
Frederick G. Wheatcroft was born in Alfreton, Derbyshire in 1882. He started his football career with his hometown club, the original Alfreton Town club before moving to Division One side Derby County in 1903.

The centre forward found opportunities within the first team limited mainly due to the prolific goalscoring exploits of Steve Bloomer. In 1904 he joined Swindon Town as an amateur but soon rejoined Derby County before venturing to Wiltshire again in 1905.

After a brief spell with Fulham Wheatcroft returned to County for his final spell where he clocked up 20 appearances, scoring 4 goals.

== Swindon Town ==
Wheatcroft left Derby for Berkshire outfit Reading but soon returned to Swindon Town in 1909. It was during this spell that Freddie Wheatcroft enjoyed his longest spell and best work as a footballer. He scored 22 times in 38 appearances throughout the 1909/10 campaign.

His career was halted by the outbreak of the First World War.

== The Great War ==
Like many other British males, Wheatcroft answered his nation's call and enlisted to fight during World War I. He was conscripted into the East Surrey Regiment as private in May 1916 and 12 months later had risen to the rank of second lieutenant. Wheatcroft was killed in action in Bourlon on 26 November 1917 while conducting a retreat during the Battle of Cambrai and is buried in Anneux Military Cemetery.
