= George Hunt (footballer, born 1922) =

English footballer

Personal information
- Full name: Reginald George Hunt
- Date of birth: 27 February 1922
- Place of birth: Swindon, England
- Date of death: 1987 (aged 64–65)
- Place of death: Swindon, England
- Position: Right back

Senior career*
Years	Team	Apps	(Gls)
1947–1958	Swindon Town	304	(0)
- * Club domestic league appearances and goals

George Hunt (27 February 1922 – 1987) was an English footballer who played as a right back.

He left school at the age of 14 and began work in the Great Western Railway Works. Hunt originally played football as an amateur for local team Ferndale Athletic, but joined the Army on the outbreak of World War II.

During the war he served in the Middle East and alongside the Desert Rats. It was during a game between armed services in Italy that he was approached by Stan Cullis of Wolverhampton Wanderers, who offered him a trial at the club when the war finished. Hunt declined and returned to Swindon on demob.

Swindon Town offered him a series of trials with him playing in the outside right position, but an injury during a game led him to dropping back into defence and taking up the right back role.

He signed for the club as a professional in 1947 and made his first senior appearance against Exeter in September 1948. Over his eleven years as a professional player for the club he made 328 appearances in total including 24 Cup appearances.

He retired in 1958 and as a qualified coach, assisted the club's back room staff on an intermittent basis whilst returning to work in the GWR Locomotive Works.

It was here that he eventually contracted peritoneal mesothelioma (also known as "The Swindon Disease") caused by exposure to asbestos which led to his death in 1987.
