= Ko Stijger =

Dutch footballer

Personal information
- Date of birth: 1 May 1915
- Date of death: 31 December 1997 (aged 82)

International career
Years	Team	Apps	(Gls)
1940–1946	Netherlands	2	(0)

Ko Stijger (1 May 1915 – 31 December 1997) was a Dutch footballer. He played in two matches for the Netherlands national football team from 1940 to 1946.
