= Jimmy Allan (footballer, born 1953) =

Scottish footballer and manager

Personal information
- Full name: James Allan
- Date of birth: 10 November 1953 (age 72)
- Place of birth: Inverness, Scotland
- Position: Goalkeeper

Youth career
- Brora Rangers
- 1971: Swindon Town

Senior career*
Years	Team	Apps	(Gls)
1971–1984	Swindon Town	371	(0)
1996	Torrington	5	(0)

Managerial career
- Torrington
- * Club domestic league appearances and goals

Jimmy Allan (born 10 November 1953) is a Scottish former footballer, who played as a goalkeeper for Swindon Town.

Allan began his football career as an apprentice with Brora Rangers in the Scottish Highland Football League, before being invited to sign a youth contract with Swindon Town in 1971 by then manager Fred Ford. Impressing the club during his trial period, he was offered a professional contract and made his first team debut the same year against Queens Park Rangers, keeping a clean sheet.

Making only six more appearances in the first team in 1971 due to the presence of more experienced goalkeepers in the squad, he did get selected again until 1973 when Peter Downsborough was sold following internal disagreements.

A devout Christian, Allan became the first British professional footballer to refuse to play on a Sunday in January 1974, with manager Les Allen saying "Jimmy told me it would be against his religious beliefs to play on a Sunday and I respect his views." In spite of this statement, he was dropped from the first team until the beginning of the 1976-77 season.

His career was ended in October 1983 when his left arm was shattered during a challenge with Rochdale player Steve Johnson. The injury was so severe that Allan could never fully straighten the arm after the many operations he underwent.

He announced his retirement in 1986, completing 371 league appearances and 108 clean sheets for the club and was rewarded with a testimonial match against Chelsea in May of that year.

Allan then moved to Devon with his wife and three children and took up work in a box manufacturing company. In 1996, he assisted with coaching at local team Torrington and made a small number of appearances in goal, despite only being able to use one arm effectively.
