= Garth Hudson (footballer) =

English footballer

Personal information
- Full name: George William Hudson
- Date of birth: 26 October 1923
- Place of birth: Havant, England
- Date of death: 13 August 2014 (aged 90)
- Place of death: Havant, England
- Position: Defender

Youth career
- Havant Rovers

Senior career*
Years	Team	Apps	(Gls)
1945–1948	Portsmouth	1	(0)
1948–1960	Swindon Town	401	(11)
- * Club domestic league appearances and goals

George "Garth" William Hudson (26 October 1923 – 13 August 2014) was an English professional footballer who made 402 appearances in the English Football League playing for Portsmouth and Swindon Town.
