= Archie Bown =

English footballer

Personal information
- Date of birth: 12 July 1882
- Place of birth: Highworth, England
- Date of death: 19 August 1958 (aged 75–76)
- Place of death: Southampton, England
- Position: Inside left

Senior career*
Years	Team	Apps	(Gls)
?–1904	Swindon Casuals		
1904	Swindon Town	1	(0)
1904–?	Swindon Casuals		
?–1907	Whiteheads		
1907–1915	Swindon Town	252	(125)
1915–1919	Southampton (guest)		
1919–1922	Bristol City		
1922–?	Weymouth		
- * Club domestic league appearances and goals

Archie Bown (1882 – 19 August 1958) was a football inside left.

== Football career ==
Born in Highworth, Wiltshire, Bown began his football career playing for the local Swindon Casuals team. It was here that Swindon Town spotted him and offered him a trial, playing one first team match in February 1904. Having not proved himself adequately he returned to his old team and his job as a turner and fitter in the Great Western Railway's Workshop.

Bown returned to Swindon Town in 1907, signing a professional contract. He went on to score 9 goals in 16 appearances that season and regularly appeared on the scoresheet from then on. 1911/12 was his most prolific season for the club, when he scored 23 goals in Southern League matches. He was part of the team that from 1909 to 1912 won the Dubonnet Cup and the Southern Charity Cup, whilst also becoming Runner's up of the Charity Shield and twice FA Cup semi-finalists. He scored a goal in the 1912 FA Cup run that ultimately knocked Everton out of the competition, causing a minor upset at the time.

Bown helped Swindon to their second Southern League championship in 1914, making 36 appearances and scoring 18 times and in April 1915 he scored all six of Swindon's goals in a 6–0 win against Watford. His career with the team was ended by the First World War although he remains Swindon's fifth-highest goalscorer.

He guested for Southampton during the war (in which he served in the British Armed Forces) and afterwards appeared for Bristol City and Weymouth. He died in Southampton on 19 August 1958.
