= Harry Kay (footballer) =

English footballer

Personal information
- Full name: Harry Kay
- Date of birth: 23 March 1883
- Place of birth: Unsworth, England
- Date of death: 1954 (aged 70–71)
- Position: Full-back

Senior career*
Years	Team	Apps	(Gls)
1903–1904	Unsworth Parish Church		
1905–1906	Bolton Wanderers	1	(0)
1907–1908	Leeds City	31	(0)
1908–1922	Swindon Town	277	(0)
Total		309	(0)
- * Club domestic league appearances and goals

Harry Kay (23 March 1883–1954) was an English footballer who played in the Football League for Bolton Wanderers, Leeds City and Swindon Town.
