= Maurice Owen =

English footballer

Personal information
- Date of birth: 4 July 1924
- Place of birth: Abingdon, England
- Date of death: 8 July 2000 (aged 76)
- Place of death: Abingdon, England
- Positions: Forward; defender

Senior career*
Years	Team	Apps	(Gls)
1946	Abingdon Town		
1946–1963	Swindon Town	555	(150)
- * Club domestic league appearances and goals

Maurice Owen (4 July 1924 – 8 July 2000) was an English professional footballer who scored 150 goals in 555 appearances in the Football League playing for Swindon Town.

== Early life ==
Born in Abingdon, Oxfordshire, Owen served as a Chindit in Burma during the latter years of World War II. He returned to Abingdon following the war, working as an apprentice in the MG factory in the town.

== Career ==
Owen joined Swindon from non-league side Abingdon Town in December 1946. He started his Swindon career in impressive goal scoring form, scoring sixteen times in seventeen matches during his first season, including a hattrick on his debut against Watford and a four-goal haul during a match against Mansfield Town. During his career, Swindon twice agreed a fee to sell Owen to other clubs, £14,000 to Norwich City in 1951 and £7,500 to Bristol City in 1955, but Owen rejected both moves, not wanting to move away from his home in Abingdon. There were also unsuccessful approaches from Portsmouth and Wolverhampton Wanderers. After his retirement, Owen commented on his refusal to move away from Swindon, stating:

"I would have liked to play in the First Division, I suppose, but not enough to make me move. To be honest, I was so happy at Swindon. They were a good club and I was among good friends. It was a joy to go to the County Ground every day."

Having started his career as a centre forward, he later moved back into defence. In all competitions he scored 164 goals from 601 appearances for the club. After he finished playing he joined Swindon's backroom staff, serving as a coach before working as a groundsman, eventually retiring in 1984.

== Later life ==
Owen was married to his wife Marjorie for nearly 50 years. In his later years, he suffered with Alzheimer's disease for more than a decade and suffered a stroke in 1998. Still living in his hometown Abingdon, Oxfordshire, he died in 2000 at the age of 76.

== Career statistics ==
Season	Team	League Apps	League Goals	Cup Apps	Cup Goals
1962–63	Swindon Town	27	0	4	0
1961–62	Swindon Town	44	0	4	0
1960–61	Swindon Town	40	0	6	0
1959–60	Swindon Town	0	0	0	0
1958–59	Swindon Town	36	2	3	0
1957–58	Swindon Town	33	3	0	0
1956–57	Swindon Town	37	7	2	0
1955–56	Swindon Town	44	13	5	2
1954–55	Swindon Town	33	12	1	0
1953–54	Swindon Town	29	10	0	0
1952–53	Swindon Town	40	17	3	4
1951–52	Swindon Town	41	18	9	6
1950–51	Swindon Town	28	9	0	0
1949–50	Swindon Town	29	10	2	1
1948–49	Swindon Town	42	17	1	1
1947–48	Swindon Town	35	16	6	1
1946–47	Swindon Town	17	16	0	0
